= List of films about martial law under Ferdinand Marcos =

This is a list of films that deals with topics about the 1972–1981 martial law under Ferdinand Marcos. Various filmmakers made films that directly deal with the political atmosphere, provide social commentary, or chronicle the life of Filipinos during the period. Most of the feature films circle on the struggles and human rights abuses during the oppressive state of the government at that time.

== Feature films ==
Year	Title	Director	Writer	Notes
1975	Maynila sa Kuko ng Liwanag (Manila in the Claws of Light)	Lino Brocka	Edgardo M. Reyes (original story); Clodualdo del Mundo Jr. (screenplay)	
1976	Sakada	Behn Cervantes	Oscar Miranda (story); Lualhati Bautista (screenplay)	
1976	Nunal sa Tubig	Ishmael Bernal	Jorge Arago	
1976	Ganito Kami Noon, Paano Kayo Ngayon?	Eddie Romero	Eddie Romero and Roy Iglesias	
1976	Insiang	Lino Brocka	Mario O'Hara (story); Mario O'Hara and Lamberto E. Antonio (screenplay)	
1978	Tadhana	Nonoy Marcelo	Nonoy Marcelo (screenplay)	
1980	Manila By Night	Ishmael Bernal	Ishmael Bernal and Ricardo Lee	
1981	Kisapmata	Mike de Leon	Quijano de Manila (story); Mike de Leon, Clodualdo del Mundo Jr. and Raquel Villavicencio (screenplay)	
1982	Batch '81 (Alpha Kappa Omega)	Mike de Leon	Mike de Leon, Clodualdo del Mundo Jr. and Raquel Villavicencio	
1982	Relasyon	Ishmael Bernal	Ricardo Lee and Raquel Villavicencio	
1983	Oliver	Nick Deocampo	Nick Deocampo	
1984	Bayan Ko: Kapit sa Patalim	Lino Brocka	Jose F. Lacaba and Jose Carreon (story); Jose F. Lacaba (screenplay)	
1984	Sister Stella L.	Mike de Leon	Mike de Leon, Jose F. Lacaba and Jose Almojeula	
1985	Scorpio Nights	Peque Gallaga	Rosauro Q. de la Cruz	
1985	Anak Ko... Lando	Diego Cagahastian		Biographical film about Rolando Galman
1986	Bagong Hari	Mario O'Hara	Frank Rivera	
1986	Paano Kita Malilimutan	Vittorio Romero		
1988	Sa Dulo ng Baril	Jerry O. Tirazona	Jerry O. Tirazona	
1988	A Dangerous Life	Robert Markowitz	David Williamson	
1989	Fight for Us	Lino Brocka	Jose F. Lacaba	
1995	Eskapo	Chito Roño	Roy Iglesias and Jose F. Lacaba	
2000	Pangarap ng Puso	Mario O'Hara	Rey de Castro and Mario O'Hara	
2001	Batang West Side	Lav Diaz	Lav Diaz	
2002	Dekada '70	Chito Roño	Lualhati Bautista	
2004	Evolution of a Filipino Family (Ebolusyon ng Isang Pamilyang Pilipino)	Lav Diaz	Lav Diaz	
2006	Batas Militar	Jess Lapid Jr.	Jess Lapid Jr. and Henry Nadong (story); Henry Nadong (screenplay)	
2007	Pisay	Kanakan Balintagos (Auraeus Solito)	Henry Grajeda	
2009	Dukot (Desaparecidos)	Joel Lamangan	Bonifacio Ilagan	
2010	Muli	Adolfo Alix Jr.	Jerry Gracio	
2010	Sigwa	Joel Lamangan	Bonifacio Ilagan	
2011	Ka Oryang	Sari Lluch Dalena	Sari Lluch Dalena and Keith Sicat	
2012	Aparisyon	Isabel Sandoval (credited as Vincent Sandoval)	Isabel Sandoval and Jerry Gracio (story); Isabel Sandoval (screenplay)	
2013	Bukas na Lang Sapagka't Gabi Na	Jet Leyco	Jet Leyco and Norman Wilwayco	
2013	Barber's Tales (Mga Kuwentong Barbero)	Jun Lana	Peter Ong Lim, Elmer Gatchalian, Benedict Mique and Jun Lana (story); Jun Lana (screenplay)	
2013	Mga Anino ng Kahapon	Alvin Yapan	Alvin Yapan	
2013	Burgos	Joel Lamangan	Ricardo Lee	
2014	Mula sa Kung Ano ang Noon	Lav Diaz	Lav Diaz	
2016	Kusina	Cenon Palomares and David Corpuz	Cenon Palomares	
2017	Respeto	Treb Monteras	Treb Monteras and Njel de Mesa	
2018	Citizen Jake	Mike de Leon	Mike de Leon, Noel Pascual and Atom Araullo	
2018	Ang Panahon ng Halimaw (Season of the Devil)	Lav Diaz	Lav Diaz	
2018	ML	Benedict Mique Jr.	Benedict Mique Jr.	
2018	Liway	Kip Oebanda	Kip Oebanda and Zig Dulay	
2021	Katips	Vincent Tañada	Vincent Tañada	
2022	Maid in Malacañang	Darryl Yap	Darryl Yap	
2023	Oras de Peligro	Joel Lamangan	Joel Lamangan	
2023	Ako si Ninoy	Vincent Tañada	Vincent Tañada	
2025	Manila's Finest	Raymond Red	Michiko Yamamoto	
2026	Edjop	Katski Flores	Katski Flores	

== Documentary films ==
This includes feature-length documentary films and docudramas.

Year	Title	Director	Notes
1977	Da Real Makoy	Nonoy Marcelo	
1983	Signos	Mike de Leon	
1986	Marcos: A Malignant Spirit	Rolly Reyes	
1987	Revolutions Happen Like Refrains in a Song	Nick Deocampo	
1987	EDJOP	Joe Cuaresma	
1987	Beyond The Walls of Prison	Lito Tiongson	
1988	A Rustling of Leaves: Inside the Philippine Revolution	Nettie Wild	
1994	Why Is Yellow the Middle of the Rainbow?	Kidlat Tahimik	
1997	Batas Militar	Jon Red and Jeannette Ifurung	
2003	Imelda	Ramona Diaz	
2009	The Last Journey of Ninoy	Jun Reyes	
2012	1081	Kara David	production by GMA News TV for the 40th Anniversary of Martial Law Declaration, hosted by Kara David
2012	Lest We Forget: Martial Law and its victims	Ed Lingao	production of Philippine Center for Investigative Journalism
2013	The Guerilla Is A Poet	Sari Lluch Dalena and Kiri Lluch Dalena	
2015	Portraits of Mosquito Press	J Luis Burgos	
2015	Dahling Nick	Sari Lluch Dalena	
2016	Forbidden Memory	Teng Mangansakan	
2017	Alaala	Adolfo Alix Jr.	Produced by GMA Network
2017	History of the Underground	Sari Lluch Dalena and Keith Sicat	
2019	The Kingmaker	Lauren Greenfield	U.S./Danish Production; Greenwich Entertainment
2022	11,103	Mike Alcazaren and Jeanette Ifurung	

== See also ==
- Cinema of the Philippines
- Ferdinand Marcos
- Films depicting Latin American military dictatorships
- Martial law in the Philippines
- Martial law under Ferdinand Marcos
