= 11,103 =

2022 documentary film by Jeannette Ifurung and Mike Alcazaren

- Directed by: Jeannette Ifurung; Mike Alcazaren
- Written by: Jeannette Ifurung; Mike Alcazaren
- Produced by: Kara Magsanoc-Alikpala
- Cinematography: Lee Briones
- Edited by: Lawrence S. Ang
- Music by: Erwin Romulo; Malek Lopez; Juan Miguel Sobrepeña
- Production company: Storytellers International
- Release date: September 21, 2022 (Philippines)
- Country: Philippines
- Languages: Filipino; English

11,103 is a 2022 Philippine documentary film written and directed by Jeannette Ifurung and Mike Alcazaren. Produced by journalist Kara Magsanoc-Alikpala, it features interviews with survivors of state-sponsored violence during the martial law era under Ferdinand Marcos. The film premiered in the Philippines on September 21, 2022, coinciding with the 50th anniversary of the proclamation of martial law.

== Premise ==
11,103 features interviews about firsthand accounts of state-sponsored violence during martial law under Ferdinand Marcos. The documentary features 11 survivors recognized by Republic Act 10368 to provide repatriations; several of them are survivors of the 1981 Las Navas massacre and the 1974 Palimbang massacre. One of the interviews takes place at the mosque where the Palimbang massacre took place, with the family interviewed openly speaking of their accounts for the first time. The interviewees include: Edicio dela Torre, a SVD priest who was beaten in prison, who discusses his "own healing" through art, and shows his ink portraits and animations used in the documentary and work as president of the Philippine Rural Reconstruction Movement; Aurora Parong, a Philippine General Hospital doctor imprisoned for treating suspected New People's Army members who recalls her brother being abducted in plain sight; and a church teacher abducted from a pastor's home in Davao who was imprisoned and sexually abused for weeks and now leads a crisis center for women.

The film shows the archival work of the Human Rights Violations Victims Memorial Commission (HRVVMC) and people lining up to receive compensation from Republic Act No. 10368. Accounts are interspersed with footage of the UniTeam presidential campaign. The film also discusses the Freedom Memorial Museum and features footage of the cornerstone laying in 2022. The documentary ends with survivors of the Sag-od massacre, followed by an interview between Bongbong Marcos and Juan Ponce Enrile, denying that anyone was "arrested because of political or religious beliefs" during the martial law period, and the archived documents of the HRVVMC.

== Development ==
The film was directed by Jeannette Ifurung and animator Mike Alcazaren, and was produced by Kara Magsanoc-Alikpala and Storytellers International, Inc. The documentary visualizes several events through hand-drawn illustrations and animations, such as the account of the Palimbang massacre. The number in the title represents the number of victim-survivors recognized for compensation by Republic Act No. 10368, known as the "Human Rights Victims Reparation and Recognition Act of 2013".

== Release ==
On September 21, 2022, the documentary premiered in the Philippines at the University of the Philippines Film Center and a free outdoor screening at the Bantayog ng mga Bayani. The premiere took place in the 50th anniversary of the signing of Presidential Proclamation No. 1081 on September 21, 1972, which formally proclaimed martial law in the Philippines from 1972 to 1981. Several of the interviewees for 11,103 joined the panel discussion in the premiere at the UP Film Center. The film was also released in several cities in the Philippines and United States.

== Accolades ==
11,103 won the Best Documentary award at the 46th Gawad Urian Awards. It also won the Best Documentary award at the Pinoy Rebyu Awards.
