= Eugenia Apostol =

Filipino publisher (1925–2026)

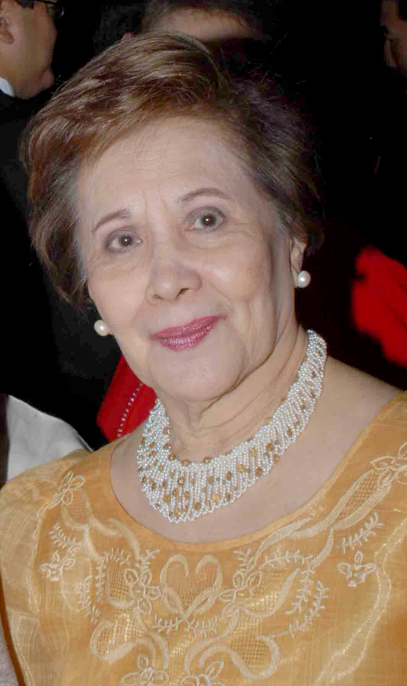
- Born: Eugenia Duran y Obsum; September 29, 1925; Sorsogon, Sorsogon, Philippine Islands
- Died: September 13, 2026 (aged 100); Manila, Philippines
- Education: University of Santo Tomas
- Spouse: Jose Z. Apostol
- Children: 1
- Awards: Ramon Magsaysay Award

Eugenia "Eggie" Obsum Duran-Apostol (born Eugenia Obsum Duran, September 29, 1925 – September 13, 2026) was a Filipino publisher who played pivotal roles in the peaceful overthrow of two Philippine presidents: Ferdinand Marcos in 1986 and Joseph Estrada in 2001. She was awarded the 2006 Ramon Magsaysay Award for Journalism, Literature & Creative Communication Arts.

In 1977, she and her husband Jose Apostol established the magazine Mr. & Ms., for which she served as editor-in-chief; from 1983 to 1985, the magazine's special edition extensively covered the investigation into the assassination of Ninoy Aquino. In December 1985, she founded the Philippine Daily Inquirer newspaper alongside other journalists in the aftermath of President Marcos announcing a snap presidential election, seeking to provide the anti-Marcos opposition with journalism outside the Marcos regime's influence.

== Early life and education ==
Apostol was born on September 29, 1925, the second child and second daughter among eight children of Fernando Ballesteros Duran, a doctor and member of the National Assembly, and Vicenta Obsum. In 1936, when her father was re-elected to the National Assembly, the family moved to Manila, where Apostol attended Holy Ghost College (now College of the Holy Spirit), where she finished elementary school as valedictorian in 1938.

With the Japanese occupation of Manila in 1944, the family returned to Sorsogon. While poking through the ruins of their home after the battle for liberation, 18-year-old Apostol was injured by shrapnel when an unspent bazooka shell exploded. Apostol graduated magna cum laude at the University of Santo Tomas (UST) with a Bachelor of Arts in Philosophy and Letters in 1949. Novelist F. Sionil Jose was among Apostol's classmates at UST, and recalled her as being "a very good writer, very sweet, very hardworking". She wrote a column for Commonweal, a national Catholic weekly, and advertising copy for Philippine Manufacturing Company (now Procter & Gamble Philippines). She met Jose "Peping" Z. Apostol, an engineer and contractor, upon introduction by her Holy Ghost classmates on New Year's Eve 1948, with the two later marrying at San Vicente de Paul Church in Manila on February 18, 1950.

== Early career ==
In 1950, Apostol became women's section editor of The Sentinel, a national news weekly, which succeeded Commonweal in 1949 as a publication of the Archdiocese of Manila. The ultraconservative Archbishop of Manila became unhappy over liberal views expressed in The Sentinel, at a time when the Church was defensive over criticism from some social sectors about the complicity of the Church in the unjust power structures of Philippine society. The church authorities were not too pleased as well when the employees of The Sentinel organized a union with Apostol as the union's vice-president. Apostol criticized the archbishop's ban on ballet classes and performances in Catholic schools as well as a controversy triggered by the presence of Russian ballet teachers at St Scholastica's, a convent school. This was the era of the "Red Scare". Apostol resigned.

In 1954, Apostol became women's section editor and associate editor of Sunday Times magazine, the supplement of the country's leading daily, The Manila Times. She stayed with the Times for ten years (1954–64), working with both the magazine and the newspaper. She found light work in handling, as editor and writer, the traditional women's beat of home, fashion, food, and human-interest features, and had a knack for infusing something lively, fresh, and innovative into what would otherwise be "canned" and conventional. In 1964, Apostol moved to the Manila Chronicle as editor of its new Sunday supplement Woman and Home. Woman and Home was phased out in 1969 but Apostol stayed on with the Chronicle as one of four women editors of its expanded Better Living section. When Amando Doronila became editor-in-chief of the Chronicle in May 1972, he decided to consolidate all sections of the newspaper under one editor, for which he chose Rosalinda "Baby" Orosa. Apostol did not respond to Doronila's decision well, and resigned from the newspaper. Defense Secretary Juan Ponce Enrile, Jose Apostol's close friend who had a political fallout with Chronicle owners Fernando and Eugenio Lopez, threw a dinner party for Eugenia Apostol at the Manila Hilton (now Waterfront Manila Hotel & Casino) in response to her resignation.

Apostol claimed that it was because her husband Jose was Enrile's favorite engineer that she was allowed to launch a woman's magazine at a time when Ferdinand Marcos was closing down many publications, allowing only pro-government titles to operate. The magazine's publishers, former executives of the Manila Chronicle, sought Apostol's aid in gaining the intercession of Defense Secretary Enrile for the approval of their application to publish. In late 1972, Apostol became editor of the Woman's Home Companion, the first women's magazine established in the Philippines during martial law. Apostol quit Woman's Home Companion in 1975. In March 1976, she established the Ex Libris Publishing Company, Inc. alongside Defense Secretary Enrile and his wife Cristina through their JAKA Investments Corporation. After a few months, the publisher struggled with its finances, and by September 1976 was assisted by businessmen Luis Villafuerte and Ramon Siy in additional funding and the restructuring Ex Libris, after which Apostol launched the Mr. & Ms. magazine in 1977. Ex Libris became Mr. & Ms. Publishing Co., Inc., and was operated as a partnership among friends, with the Apostol couple, the Enrile couple, Villafuerte and Siy having equal shares in the company (1000 each) up to the mid-1980s. According to Apostol, the magazine struggled for five years before it broke even due to a crowded women's magazine market.

She published a series of Mr. & Ms. supplements authored by Nick Joaquin - re-tellings of Philippine legends and mythology which were later bound as Pop Stories for Groovy Kids, recognized as an important contribution to the history of children's fiction in the Philippines.

== Politicization ==
During the dictatorship of Ferdinand Marcos, Apostol used the variety magazine as a platform to air anti-government views, publishing articles that would otherwise be banned in less independent media. In December 1982 the National Intelligence Bureau summoned eight women journalists including Apostol for interrogation at an army camp – described by outright "intimidation" by Ceres Doyo, one of the women interrogated. When opposition leader Benigno Aquino Jr. was assassinated, Apostol launched a weekly supplement to Mr. & Ms. devoted entirely to anti-Marcos politics, Mr. & Ms. Special Edition.

=== Examples of articles published in Mr. & Ms. viewed as anti-Marcos ===
These examples were contained in the National Press Club publication The Philippine Press Under Siege Volume II.

- "The Silencing of Letty Magsanoc" (by Salvador P. Lopez, from 'Freedom of the Press', Mr. & Ms., July 28, 1981)
- "The Letty Magsanoc Story" (by Leonor J. Aureus, originally submitted to Celebrity magazine but subsequently pulled by the author because of censorship. Mr. & Ms., August 25, 1981)
- Freedom of the Press series, Mr. & Ms., August to October 1981)
- "Transcript: President Marcos responds to Eugenia Apostol's questions about the Magsanoc case", Mr. & Ms. 1981)
- "Why is Tony Nieva in Jail?" (by Leonor J. Aureus, published May 10, 1983)
- "Too Late the Memo (of General Ver)" (by Eugenia D. Apostol, published February 15, 1983)
- "Jose Rizal Lecture" (by Jose W. Diokno, delivered at the P.E.N. conference on The Writer in a Climate of Fear July 2, 1983, published by Mr. & Ms., July 26, 1983)

== Mr. & Ms. Special Edition ==
On August 21, 1983, opposition leader Benigno "Ninoy" Aquino Jr. was assassinated upon his arrival from exile in the United States. Though the funeral drew over two million people, it was ignored by most of the media. In a recorded interview, Apostol described her reaction: "Next day, I said: 'What's this? Not a single photo of the funeral in the papers, as if nothing happened.' What really got me was the Times Journal – owned by Benjamin Romualdez, brother of Mrs. Imelda Marcos. What they printed was the photo of the spectator who was hit by lightning — that was their top news!"

A Time magazine article that hailed Apostol as an Asian hero, described what she did next: "Apostol fumed. Within days she was printing a tabloid version of her glossy Mr. & Ms. called Mr. & Ms. Special Edition. It had 16 pages of photographs showing Aquino's body, the multitudes that came to view it, and the massive funeral parade that wound through the streets of Manila for almost 12 hours. The first run was some half a million copies, yet it could not satisfy demand. In the coming months, as momentum built for the People Power revolution that would topple Marcos three years later, Apostol turned the tabloid into a weekly endeavor, putting it out from a raggedy office that, for security reasons, did not even have the publication's name on the door."

Apostol had instructed her staff to put out a special report on Aquino in the September 2, 1983, issue of Mr. & Ms. as well as a "special edition" sixteen-page supplement about the funeral. The supplement sold 750,000 copies and had a significant impact in arousing public anger at the dictatorship. She launched the weekly Mr. & Ms. Special Edition, with journalist Letty Jimenez Magsanoc as editor. The special edition's masthead declared its commitment to "justice and reconciliation in the aftermath of the Aquino assassination". The public response to the forty-page, black-and-white weekly was described as "phenomenal". Sales rose from two hundred thousand to half-a-million copies, numbers unprecedented in the country. The appearance of the publication was a high moment in the campaign against the Marcos dictatorship in the Philippines. Ferdinand Marcos was toppled by a popular uprising known as the People Power Revolution in 1986.

== Philippine Inquirer (weekly) ==
In February 1985, the trial of the military personnel accused in the Aquino murder commenced, conducted by the Sandiganbayan, a special court for officers of the state. During a conversation with Letty Jimenez Magsanoc at Goldilocks, Apostol had the idea of creating a new weekly newspaper to cover the trial. She launched the Philippine Inquirer, a tabloid-size weekly of Mr. & Ms., on February 4, 1985, with herself as publisher and editor-in-chief, Magsanoc as editor, and a staff of only two writers – JP Fenix and Candy Quimpo. The "Philippine Inquirer" name was suggested by Magsanoc who took inspiration from The Philadelphia Inquirer in the United States. Initially focused on the trial, it slowly acquired all the elements of a regular paper. Its final issue came out on December 2, 1985, after the Sandiganbayan handed down its controversial decision acquitting the accused.

== Philippine Daily Inquirer ==
In January 1985, Apostol had invited some of the country's biggest mass-media publishers to breakfast in her home to suggest a new publishing project. The group included Joaquin "Chino" Roces of the Manila Times, Teodoro Locsin, Sr. and Teodoro Locsin, Jr. of the Philippines Free Press, Raul Locsin of Business Day, Jose Burgos Jr. of WE Forum and Malaya, and Betty Go-Belmonte of the Fookien Times. Apostol's goal was to persuade the group to launch a single daily newspaper, but other than Go-Belmonte, the group was largely unenthusiastic.

Undeterred, Apostol pushed ahead and engaged with other journalists: Letty Jimenez Magsanoc, Doris Nuyda, Max Solivén and Luis D. Beltran, as well as her friends Eliseo Alampay, a lawyer, and Florangel Rosario Braid, an academician. Together, they managed to raise a seed capital of a million pesos in 1985 from the profits of Mr. & Ms., using the printworks of Betty Go-Belmonte's family.

When President Ferdinand Marcos announced in November 1985 that a snap presidential election would be held in February 1986, the group was forced to fast-track the establishment of her newspaper, pushing their planned date of launch from 1986 to late 1985. Apostol, alongside Go-Belmonte, Magsanoc, Solivén, Beltran and Art Borjal, established the "Philippine Daily Inquirer" (PDI). The newspaper's first issue was published on December 9, 1985. Apostol originally envisioned a cooperative-owned newspaper but the pressure of events led to the PDI being registered as a corporation, with the stipulation that only permanent employees could own stocks in the paper. Apostol headed the PDI as chair of the board of management with Betty Go-Belmonte as vice-chair.

The newspaper started with a staff of forty in a hundredsquare-meter office and a circulation of thirty thousand copies limited largely to Metro Manila. Aided by the high excitement surrounding the election campaign, PDI's growth was dramatic. Its circulation quickly ballooned to a peak of half-a-million copies daily. In just three months after its appearance, it became the leading Philippine broadsheet, accounting for 22.3 percent of the Metro Manila market, making it the country's number one daily in terms of circulation. Demand was so great that production had to be done by five different printers in separate locations in the city.

Marcos dismissed the Inquirer and other opposition papers as the "mosquito press". Military plans to arrest opposition figures after a Marcos victory were leaked to the press. Apostol's name was at the top of the list. Later, Apostol dismissed the threat, saying, "It was alphabetical." Juan Ponce Enrile, one of the initial stakeholders of Mr. & Ms. Publishing Company, filed suit against Apostol, alleging that she had diverted funds from Mr. & Ms. to establish the Inquirer. The suit referred to the use of Mr. & Ms. money to capitalize PDI. Apostol contended that the loan had been paid back. The case was dismissed in 1994 but continued until the Supreme Court finally ruled in Apostol's favor in 1998.

In the 1990s the Philippine Daily Inquirer underwent a struggle for power – between Apostol and her managers. Apostol severed all corporate and editorial ties with the Philippine Daily Inquirer on January 26, 1994, resigning from the board and retiring from the paper. She is said to have seen the battle for corporate control to be detrimental to the paper's growth.

== Later career and death ==
On January 9, 1996, Apostol founded the Foundation for Worldwide People Power (later renamed as Eggie Apostol Foundation in 2012), a non-profit organization based in Pasig with the aim to improve facilities and teaching in Philippine public schools, publish books and produce video documentaries about martial law under Ferdinand Marcos, the assassination of Benigno Aquino Jr. and the People Power Revolution titled Duet for EDSA (1996), Batas Militar (1997), Dead Aim: How Marcos Ambushed Philippine Democracy (1997), Lakas Sambayanan: People Power (2002), EDSA 1986: Mga Tinig ng Himagsikan (2006) and Beyond Conspiracy: 25 Years After the Aquino's Assassination (2008). During the presidency of Fidel Ramos, moves were made to revise the Philippine Constitution to extend the presidential term of office. Apostol published a sixteen-page, tabloid-size satirical weekly called Hu! Ha!, to oppose charter change and expose regressive political practices. The weekly covered the 1998 elections and ran from September 20, 1997, to May 16, 1998.

When President Joseph Estrada called for an advertising boycott of the Philippine Daily Inquirer and sued Manila Times over a corruption story, Apostol set up the Pinoy Times. Apostol designed it as a popular tabloid for the masses, written in everyday Filipino it attempted to deliver "quality journalism with the price, size and liveliness of a tabloid". From an initial run of 30,000 copies, its regular five-days-a-week edition rose to a circulation of 170,000 in just eighteen months. Its weekend Special Edition sold as many as half-a-million copies. The paper was met with bomb threats, hate mail, and libel suits from Estrada supporters, who at one point published an imitation tabloid in an attempt to undermine the Pinoy Times. A popular uprising – known as People Power II – forced Estrada out of power in 2001. Estrada's departure sent the sales of Pinoy Times into a slump. The paper closed on December 21, 2001, after two years in circulation.

Apostol died in Manila on September 13, 2026, at the age of 100.

== Recognition ==
In the November 2006 issue of Time magazine (international edition), Apostol and Letty Jimenez Magsanoc were cited thus: "Apostol, now 81, and Magsanoc, in her mid-60s, were not firebrands in their younger days. Both were veterans of the lipstick beat, writing for the lifestyle sections of newspapers. But the assassination of Aquino, which sparked [the People Power Revolution], galvanized Apostol and Magsanoc to break the local media's complicit silence surrounding Marcos' oppressive rule. In late 1985 they phased out Mr. & Ms. Special Edition and launched the Philippine Daily Inquirer, trailblazing a brand of hard-hitting, mischievous, in-your-face reporting that tested the limits of a dictator's tolerance and helped Filipinos win their freedom. 'In three months,' says Apostol, 'the Inquirer had not only helped to oust Marcos, it was also making money.' Today, the Inquirer is the country's largest newspaper and, while sometimes criticized for sensationalism, it has been unflinching in its coverage of government and the Philippines' uneasy transition to democracy." Apostol was awarded the Ramon Magsaysay Award for Journalism, Literature & Creative Communication Arts in 2006 in recognition of "her courageous example in placing the truth-telling press at the center of the struggle for democratic rights and better government in the Philippines".
