= Batas Militar (1997 film) =

1997 Philippine television documentary film

- Genre: Documentary
- Written by: Lito Tiongson
- Directed by: Jeannette Ifurung (Post-production); Jon Red (Film and field production)
- Narrated by: Joonee Gamboa
- Composer: Jaime Fabregas
- Country of origin: Philippines
- Original language: Filipino

Production
- Executive producer: Kara Magsanoc-Alikpala
- Producers: Eugenia Apostol; Fely Arroyo
- Running time: 110 minutes
- Production company: Foundation for Worldwide People Power

Original release
- Network: ABS-CBN
- Release: September 21, 1997

Batas Militar (transl. Martial Law, marketed as Batas Militar: A Documentary on Martial Law in the Philippines) is a 1997 Filipino television documentary film about martial law under Ferdinand Marcos, and the ouster movement against him, the People Power Revolution. The film was directed by Jon Red and Jeannette Ifurung, with the former focusing on dramatizations and narrated by Joonee Gamboa.

The documentary was produced by the Foundation for Worldwide People Power, headed by Eugenia Apostol. It was broadcast on the ABS-CBN television network on September 21, 1997. The documentary was subsequently released on VHS.

== Synopsis ==
It features the human rights violations during martial law in the Philippines, the economy, and the biographies of Ferdinand Marcos, his wife Imelda Marcos, and his prominent critic, Benigno Aquino Jr.

=== Interviewees ===
The following is a list of interviewees in the documentary, conducted from March until May 1997:

- Satur Ocampo (National Democratic Front [NDF] founder, Bayan Muna representative)
- Jovito Salonga (senator)
- Bernabe Buscayno (New People's Army [NPA] founder)
- Raul Manglapus (1965 presidential candidate, Con-Con delegate, Movement for a Free Philippines chair)
- Romeo Espino (chief-of-staff of the Armed Forces of the Philippines [AFP] from 1972 to 1981)
- Manuel Yan (chief-of-staff of the Armed Forces of the Philippines [AFP] from 1968 to 1972)
- Rafael Ileto (vice chief-of-staff of the AFP)
- Bonifacio Gillego (World War II veteran, congressman)
- Blas Ople (Secretary/Minister of Labor from 1967 to 1986, senator)
- Onofre Corpuz (Secretary of Education from 1968 to 1971)
- Imelda Marcos (First Lady of the Philippines from 1965 to 1986)
- Corazon Aquino (President of the Philippines from 1986 to 1992, wife of Benigno Aquino Jr.)
- Haydee Yorac (Chairman of the Presidential Commission on Good Government, COMELEC chairperson)
- Fidel Ramos (President of the Philippines from 1992 to 1998, chief of the Philippine Constabulary [PC] during the Marcos regime)
- Carolina Hernandez (human rights political scientist)
- Joker Arroyo (human rights lawyer during the Marcos regime, congressman and senator)
- Mariani Dimaranan (political detainee during Martial Law)
- Nena Fajardo (victim of the human rights violation during Martial Law)
- Rafael Zagala (chief of the Philippine Army during the Marcos regime)
- Priscilla Mijares (judge, widow of Primitivo Mijares)
- Letty Jimenez Magsanoc (journalist)
- Carmen Pedrosa (author)
- Behn Cervantes (film director)
- Francisco Nemenzo Jr. (political scientist)
- Eugenio Lopez Jr. (businessman, chief executive officer of ABS-CBN from 1956 to 1993)
- Vicente Paterno (technocrat during the Marcos regime, Secretary/Minister of Industry from 1974 to 1979)
- Solita Monsod (economist)
- Edicio de la Torre (founding chairperson of Christians for National Liberation)
- Ma. Ceres Doyo (journalist)
- Aquilino Pimentel Jr. (Con-Con delegate, 1978 Lakas ng Bayan candidate)
- Ed Olaguer (Light-A-Fire Movement founder)
- Doris Baffrey (April 6 Movement founder)
- Teodoro Benigno (journalist of Agence France-Presse in the Philippines)
- Jose Almonte (Reform the Armed Forces Movement founder)
- Butz Aquino (August Twenty-One Movement founder, congressman)
- Jaime Sin (Archbishop of Manila)
- June Keithley (radio and television reporter)

== Production ==
Eugenia Apostol, a journalist and publisher, brought a film crew together to create a documentary under her newly established Foundation for Worldwide People Power (renamed as the Eggie Apostol Foundation in 2012) about the injustices committed during the two-decade presidency of Ferdinand Marcos. Jon Red and Jeannette Ifurung became the film's pair of directors, with the former focusing on dramatizations and shoots on location, while the latter focused on post-production. The resulting work became the most expensive documentary film produced in the Philippines.

== Release ==
Batas Militar aired on Philippine television network ABS-CBN on September 21, 1997, the 25th anniversary of the proclamation that placed the Philippines under martial law in 1972 and was repeated on February 25, 2016, the 30th anniversary of the People Power Revolution, subsequently airing on PTV in 1998 and 2012, two ABS-CBN-owned cable channels ABS-CBN News Channel (ANC) in 2000, 2012 and 2016, and Knowledge Channel from 2011 until 2012. Afterwards, it was subsequently released on VHS. As of 2016, the documentary has not yet been released on the DVD format. However, the Eggie Apostol Foundation had posted the film available for streaming online on Facebook in September 2018, and then the filmmaker Mike de Leon has since posted the entire film on Vimeo, both but with additional archival footage not shown on the original broadcast and VHS release, omitting the film's mention of the 1968 Jabidah massacre and the 1972 Typhoon Rita. The addition of English subtitles was uploaded through his Citizen Jake production account on February 1, 2019.

The film was also screened at the International Documentary Film Festival Amsterdam (IDFA) in the Netherlands in November 1998.

== Accolades ==
The film had won the KBP Golden Dove Award and the Gawad CCP Award for both Best Television Special and Best Documentary Special in 1998.

It won a bronze medal at the New York Film Festival and was a finalist at the International Documentary Festival.

== See also ==
- List of films about martial law under Ferdinand Marcos
- 11,103, a 2022 documentary film also about martial law era under Ferdinand Marcos, with the same production team as Batas Militar
