= Magsanoc =

Magsanoc is a surname. Notable people with the surname include:

- Kara Magsanoc-Alikpala, Filipino journalist
- Letty Jimenez Magsanoc (1941–2015), Filipino journalist and editor
- Ronnie Magsanoc (born 1966), Filipino basketball player and coach
