= Imelda (film) =

- Directed by: Ramona S. Diaz
- Produced by: Ramona S. Diaz; Kyra Sedgwick; Meredith Bagby; Valerie Stadler
- Starring: Imelda Marcos; Imee Marcos; Bongbong Marcos
- Cinematography: Ferne Pearlstein
- Edited by: Leah Marino
- Music by: Bob Aves; Grace Nono
- Production company: Big Swing Productions
- Distributed by: Unitel Pictures
- Release date: November 23, 2003 (Amsterdam)
- Running time: 103 minutes
- Countries: Philippines; United States
- Languages: Filipino; English
- Box office: US$500,992 (worldwide)

Imelda is a 2003 documentary film co-produced and directed by Ramona S. Diaz about the life of Imelda Marcos, former First Lady of the Philippines. Beginning with her childhood, the film documents her marriage to future President of the Philippines Ferdinand Marcos, her rule under the dictatorship, her exile in Hawaii and her eventual return to the Philippines.

Reviews were largely favorable and it won the Excellence in Cinematography Award (Documentary) at the 2004 Sundance Film Festival. Imelda outsold Spider-Man 2 in the Philippines, but only took US$200,992 at the US box office with an additional US$300,000 worldwide. Reviews from critics are favorable with a 94% fresh rating from Rotten Tomatoes and a 69/100 from Metacritic.

== Synopsis ==
Diaz followed Imelda Marcos, the former First Lady of the Philippines, for a month and interviewed her daughter Imee and her son Ferdinand Jr. The film incorporates third party interviews and archive material; it recounts Imelda's life, including her marriage to her husband, Philippine dictator Ferdinand Marcos. Discussing the Marcos presidency, Imelda falsely claims that there were no human rights abuses in her country; she says that her husband abolished Congress and declared martial law in 1972 to protect democracy. She says that she took 3,000 pairs of shoes with her when she went into exile, and justifies her extravagant clothing by saying that it "inspired the poor to dress better". She also says that she had enormous museums and theaters constructed to enrich the lives of Filipinos.

Imelda says in one vignette that she had met United States Army General Douglas MacArthur during his landing in Tacloban at the end of World War II, and that McArthur insisted that she should perform for the composer Irving Berlin, She sang "God Bless the Philippines" and when Berlin asked her why she sang the lyrics incorrectly she said, "what's the difference between America and the Philippines?" The assassination attempt on Imelda and the assassination of Benigno Aquino Jr. are featured in the film. Footage from parties held by the Marcos couple, including one during which actor George Hamilton sang "I can't give you anything but love, Imelda", are also used in the film.

== Release and reception ==
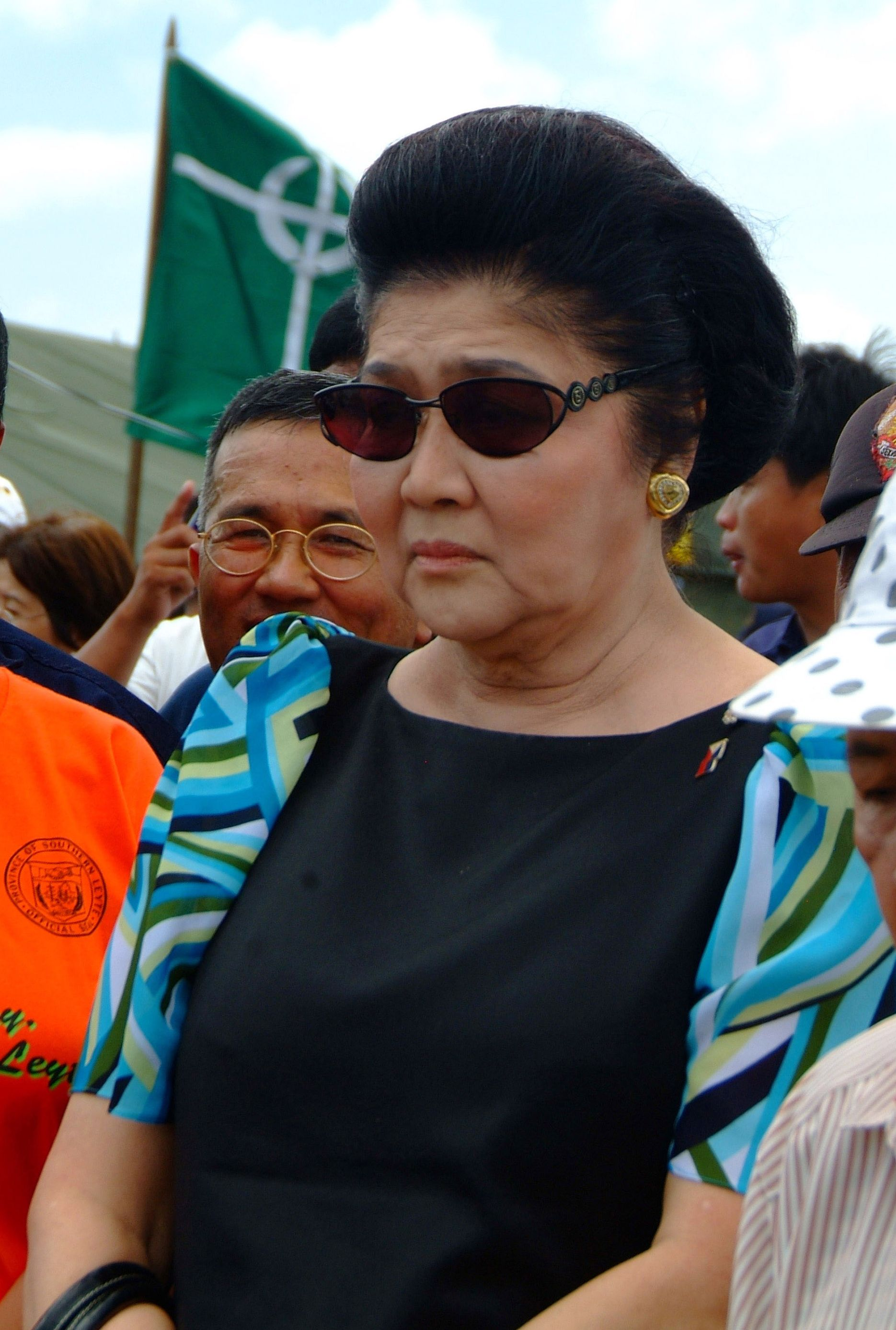
Imelda Marcos in 2006

Imelda had its world premiere at the International Documentary Film Festival Amsterdam and its North American premiere in the documentary competition of the 2004 Sundance Film Festival, where it won the Excellence in Cinematography Award Documentary. The film was also screened at the Maryland Film Festival in Baltimore.

American actor and producer Kyra Sedgwick and her production company, Big Swing Productions, produced the film along with American writer, publisher and producer Meredith Bagby and Valerie Stadler.

Critical reviews were mostly favorable. The film has a 94% fresh rating from Rotten Tomatoes and a 69/100 from Metacritic. The website Film Threat commended the film's treatment of the subject's flaws because it "allows her to describe them herself"; TV Guide called Imelda "an entertaining storyteller". The New York Times said the film is "a devastating portrait" and equates the theme of Imelda with that of delusion and power. The San Francisco Chronicle said it was "spellbinding".

Both the Chronicle and Variety consider the film balanced and even-handed. Variety said that Imelda—who has been accustomed to public attention since her teenage years, was convinced that her charm and charisma would create a more favorable impression in the film than might otherwise be expected. It said that "her defenses of her husband and his regime are obviously filled with rationalizations and obfuscations". Other reviewers were more scathing, or note her distorted reality and the many contradictions with which she lives.

The film took US$200,992 at the box office in the United States. Outside the US, the film received box office revenue of US$300,000.

In the United States, the film was shown on Public Broadcasting Service (PBS) as part of its documentary television series Independent Lens on May 10, 2005.

=== Philippine release ===
The film was scheduled to be screened in the 2004 Cinemanila film festival and on Philippine theaters in July 7, 2004, five days after Imelda Marcos's 75th birthday. On June 16, Marcos filed suit against the distributor of the film to block its distribution. Marcos contends that she was never informed that the interviews would be used in a documentary and never gave permission for the footage to be used in a commercial film. In a statement, she says:

All our lives, President Ferdinand Marcos and I were deeply committed to God, country and the Filipino people, but we are portrayed by the unauthorized 'Imelda' documentary with malice, inaccuracy and innuendos.

Marcos obtained a temporary restraining order on June 25 to stop the film's release but the petition to ban the film was denied on July 12, when the court stated that, contrary to her claims, Marcos had signed a document permitting the release of the film. The restraining order lapsed the following day, and it was able to be shown in the film festival which was extended from July 12 to July 20 to accommodate other films that were not shown during its original schedule, besides Imelda. When the injunction was canceled and the film was released, it earned more than Spider-Man 2 and was considered a smash hit.

The film was premiered on television through TV5 on February 24, 2009 and later re-aired on GMA News TV on October 5, 2014.

On February 1, 2022, the film's director Ramona Diaz made the film available for streaming online on YouTube.

== See also ==
- Batas Militar - a 1997 television documentary film about martial law under Ferdinand Marcos
- The Kingmaker - a 2019 documentary film directed by Lauren Greenfield
- List of banned films
- List of films about martial law under Ferdinand Marcos
