= Camp Olivas =

Police headquarters in the Philippines

Coordinates: 15°1′10.32″N 120°42′13.16″E

- Kampo Olivas
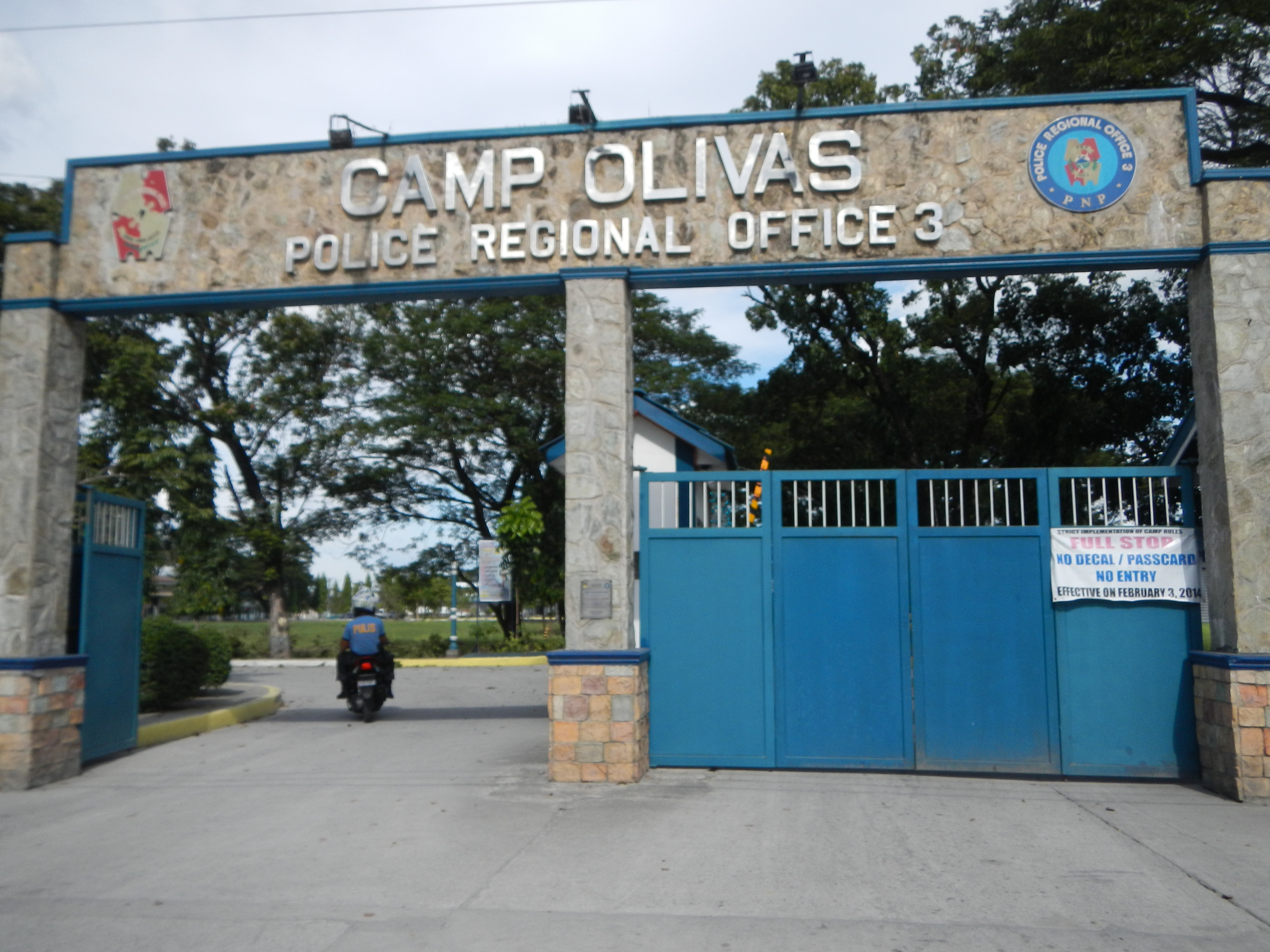
- The facade of the PNP Police Regional Office 3 in the camp.

General information
- Location: San Fernando, Pampanga, Philippines
- Current tenants: PNP Police Regional Office 3
- Named for: Captain Julian Olivas
- Groundbreaking: 1917 (as police station); 1936 (As a camp)

Camp Olivas is the regional headquarters of the Police Regional Office 3: and is located in Brgy San Nicolas along Mac Arthur Highway, Camp Olivas, City of San Fernando, Pampanga. It was named after Captain Julian Olivas.

== History ==
=== Establishment and prewar history ===
From 1917 to 1936, Camp Olivas started serving as police station and relief center, evacuation based and hospital site, as well as cadre and mobilization area. Camp Olivas was established as the First Pampanga Cadre Camp utilized by the then Insular Police known as “Philippine Constabulary. In 1939, the camp was named in honor of Captain Julian Olivas who died in the line of duty on July 12, 1939 when the heroic PC Inspector (equivalent to Provincial Director) was shot from behind by four men identified with the labor group while mediating a labor dispute at the Pampanga Sugar Development Company (PASUDECO). President Manuel L. Quezon immediately awarded him posthumously the Distinguished Contact Star medal. It was until 1957 when it became the seat of the peacekeeping regional force, the First Philippine Constabulary Zone.

=== World War II ===
During the outbreak of the Second World War (WWII), the Camp was used as the mobilization center for men-folks in Central Luzon who bravely fought in Bataan and Corregidor. The Camp was converted into a Red Cross Hospital until the fall of Bataan. The Japanese occupied the Camp until they were driven out in the early month of 1945.

=== Postwar era ===
After the war, Camp Olivas was made the headquarters of the First Military Area in 1947 and became the center of the anti-Huk campaign in Central Luzon where bloodiest encounters took place between the government forces and the HUKBALAHAP of Hukbong Bayan Laban sa Hapon, which was later became HMB of Hukbong Mapagpalaya ng Bayan after the war.

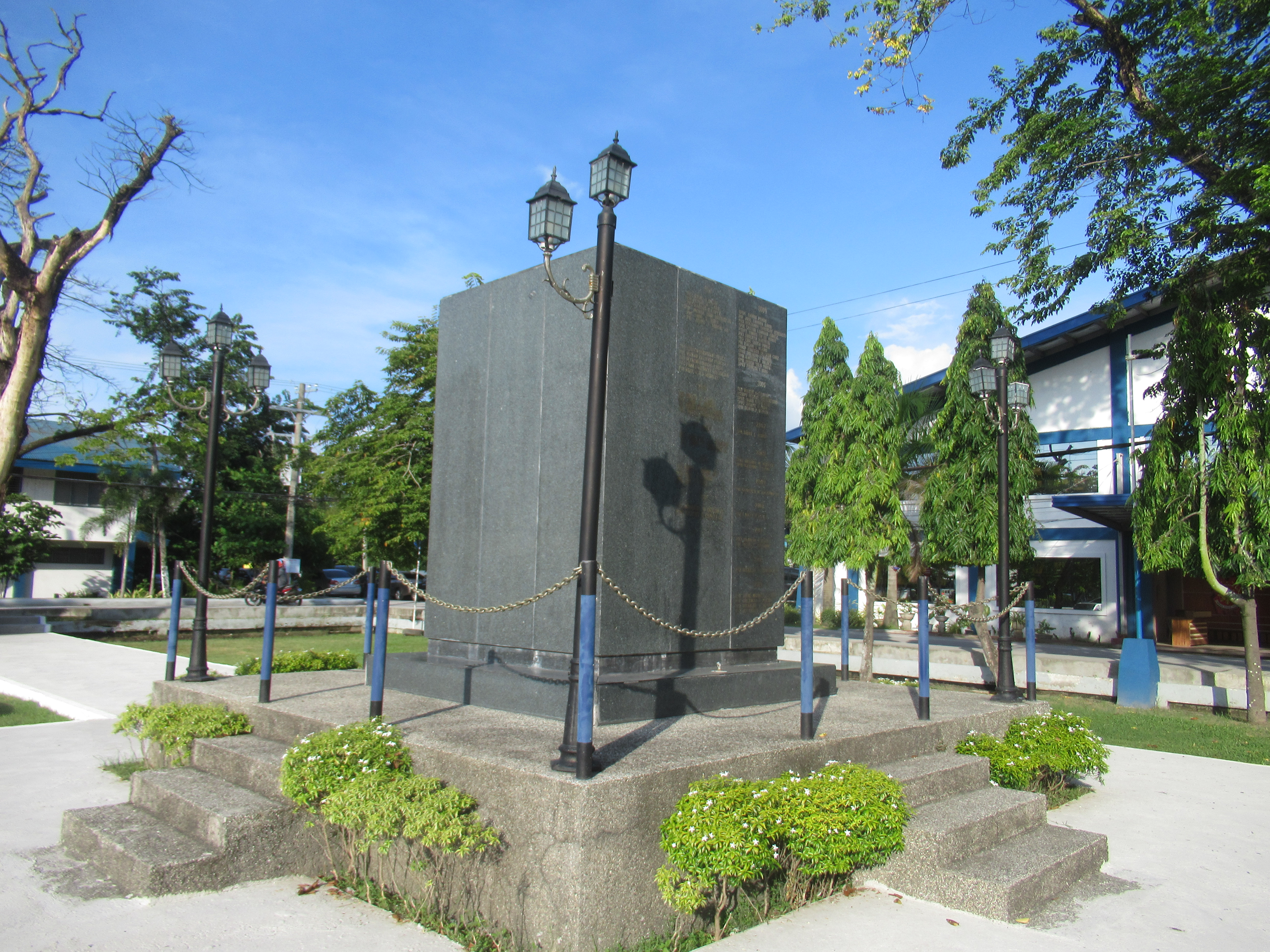
Police Regional Office 3 Heroes' Monument

The 1PCZ then has jurisdiction over the provinces of Regions 1, 2 and 3, namely: Abra; La Union; Mt Province; Batanes; Nueva Ecija; Cagayan; Ilocos Norte; Ilocos Sur; Pangasinan; Isabela; Bataan; Bulacan; Nueva Ecija; Pampanga; Tarlac and Zambales. In 1969, the area of responsibility of the 1PCZ further expanded when Congress Legistate the division Mountain Province, namely; Benguet, Kalinga Apayao, Ifugao, and retaining Mt Province. So intricate was the peace and order job of the 1PCZ that in a period of two decades, it saw the assignment of fourteen Zone Commanders from 1957 up to 1978.

=== During the Marcos dictatorship ===
During the Marcos dictatorship, Camp Olivas was designated as one of the four provincial camps to become a Regional Command for Detainees (RECAD). It was designated RECAD I and it housed detainees from Northern and Central Luzon.

Prominent detainees imprisoned there include Edicio dela Torre, Judy Taguiwalo, Tina Pargas, Marie Hilao-Enriquez, and Bernard-Adan Ebuen. Prisoners who were documented to have been tortured include the sisters Joanna and Josefina Cariño, the brothers Romulo and Armando Palabay, and Mariano Giner Jr of Abra.

About 50 Kalinga and Bontoc leaders were also brought to Camp Olivas from their detainment center in Tabuk, Kalinga, arrested for their opposition to the Chico River Dam Project.

=== Capture by RAM during the August 1987 Philippine coup attempt ===
On August 28, 1987, Camp Olivas was briefly taken over by forces under the Reform the Armed Forces Movement during the August 1987 Philippine coup attempt. When the RAM coup failed overall, however, the RAM forces that had taken over Olivas quietly left the camp, so that the camp was back to normal by dawn the following morning.
