= And So It Begins (film) =

- Cinemalaya theatrical release poster
- Directed by: Ramona Diaz
- Written by: Ramona Diaz
- Produced by: Ramona Diaz
- Cinematography: Bruce Sakaki
- Edited by: Aaron Soffin
- Music by: Christian Almiron
- Production companies: Solar Pictures; Cinediaz Productions
- Release dates: January 2024 (Sundance); August 9, 2024 (Cinemalaya); August 21, 2024 (Philippines)
- Running time: 113 minutes
- Countries: Philippines; United States
- Languages: Filipino; English

And So It Begins is a 2024 documentary film directed by Ramona Diaz which centers around Leni Robredo's 2022 presidential campaign. A follow up to the 2020 film A Thousand Cuts it also covers Maria Ressa.

== Production ==
And So It Begins is a 113-minute documentary film directed by Ramona Diaz which gives focus on Leni Robredo's 2022 presidential campaign.

The film was originally intended to be a follow up film to A Thousand Cuts which covered Maria Ressa. However it became apparent that then Vice President Robredo would be launching a presidential campaign which the filmmakers decided to incorporate. Ressa and her efforts against disinformation was still covered in the documentary. They also covered the sentiments of supporters of Robredo's rival Bongbong Marcos.

Principal photography took place from 2021 to 2022 amidst the COVID-19 pandemic. This period covers Ressa's awarding of the Nobel Peace Prize in October 2021, and Robredo's campaigning and eventual defeat to Bongbong Marcos in the May 2022 election. The production team had to sift through 800 hours worth of footage captured by one person for the film.

== Release ==
And So It Begins premiered at the 2024 Sundance Film Festival. It was later screened at the Cinemalaya Philippine Independent Film Festival on August 9, 2024. It had a wider but still limited theatrical release in the Philippines on August 21, 2024. Major cinema chains like SM Cinemas and Ayala Malls Cinemas did not screen the film despite the producers' intention for a "national release".

== Awards and nominations ==
The Film Academy of the Philippines submitted And So It Begins as the Philippines' entry for the 97th Academy Awards. It is the first Philippine submission of a documentary film. The film was not nominated.
