= Ireneo Bughao =

Filipino mental calculator

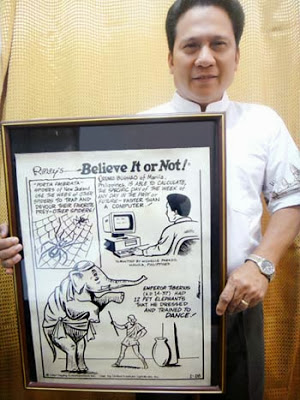
- Ireneo Bughao
- Born: June 18, 1957 (age 68); Bayawan, Negros Oriental
- Website: http://mrbluebughao.com/

Ireneo Bughao (born June 18, 1957) is a Filipino calendarist who was awarded with Ripley's Believe It or Not!'s cartoon in January 1997, with a caption that states: "Ireneo Bughao of Manila, Philippines is able to calculate the specific day of the week of any day in the past or future – faster than a computer!". He has thought of and perfected a mathematical formula, where he can determine and give accurate answers with ease and astounding speed to those who would like to know the day they were born or what day a date shall fall centuries from now.

Bughao works for Philippine Amusement and Gaming Corporation (PAGCOR) and Director Auxiliary of the 128th Squadron of Philippine Coast Guard Auxiliary [2018-2022].

== Education and recognitions ==
Bughao or Mr. Blue is a native of Negros Oriental, Philippines. He graduated valedictorian both in Elementary and High School at NORSU, formerly NONAS in Bayawan, completed A.B. Mathematics at University of Mindanao, graduated Marine Engineering and Master of Science in Management at FEATI University in Manila.

Bughao received the following recognitions from his alma maters:

- The First Hamiling Bayawanon Special Citation, February 2001, from the City of Bayawan
- Institutional Award, November 1997, from the University of Mindanao
- Outstanding CVPC Alumnus Award in the field of Mathematics, December 2001, from Central Visayas Polytechnic College in Dumaguete

Bughao has honed his mathematical skills and has been a contributor of numerical puzzles – Sunrays, Octacros, and Sequence Game, to the Mr. & Ms. Magazine from 1983 till 1986. He performed at the (now closed) Ripley's Believe It or Not! Museum in Shangri-La Mall, Ortigas for the museum's Father's Day celebration on June 15, 1997.

== Media coverage ==
Local television programs featured Bughao, including interviews and guesting in the following shows:

- Balitang K hosted by Korina Sanchez, Calendar Boy episode, Oct 1999
- Eat Bulaga, Calendar King segment, March 1995
- Eat Bulaga, Numbers King segment, June 1996
- Wake Up Call Anniversary show, November 1997
- I-Max News (Infomax) featured Bughao's Perpetual Calendar invention, 2007
- Dakila Ka Pinoy (PTV-4), October 1997

== Articles ==
- Pinoy Brainpower vs. Computer, Lifeline Advice & Features Magazine, August 1996.
- Learning the art of counting dates with the Calendar Kings, Manila Bulletin, December 27, 2001.
- Search for Outstanding Alumni 2001 commences, The State Scholar, September 2001.
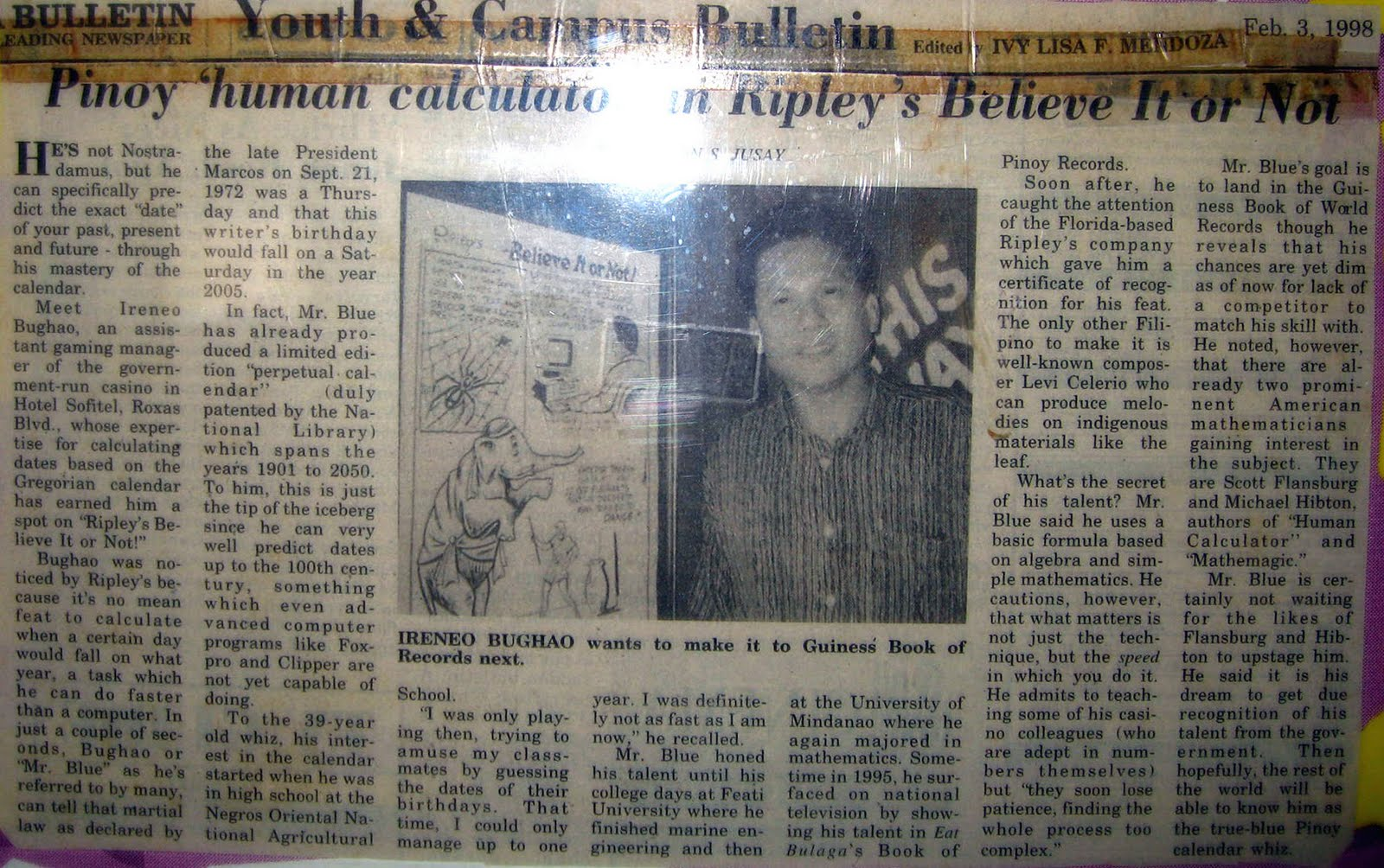
Pinoy human calculator in Ripley's Believe It or Not, Manila Bulletin, February 3, 1998.

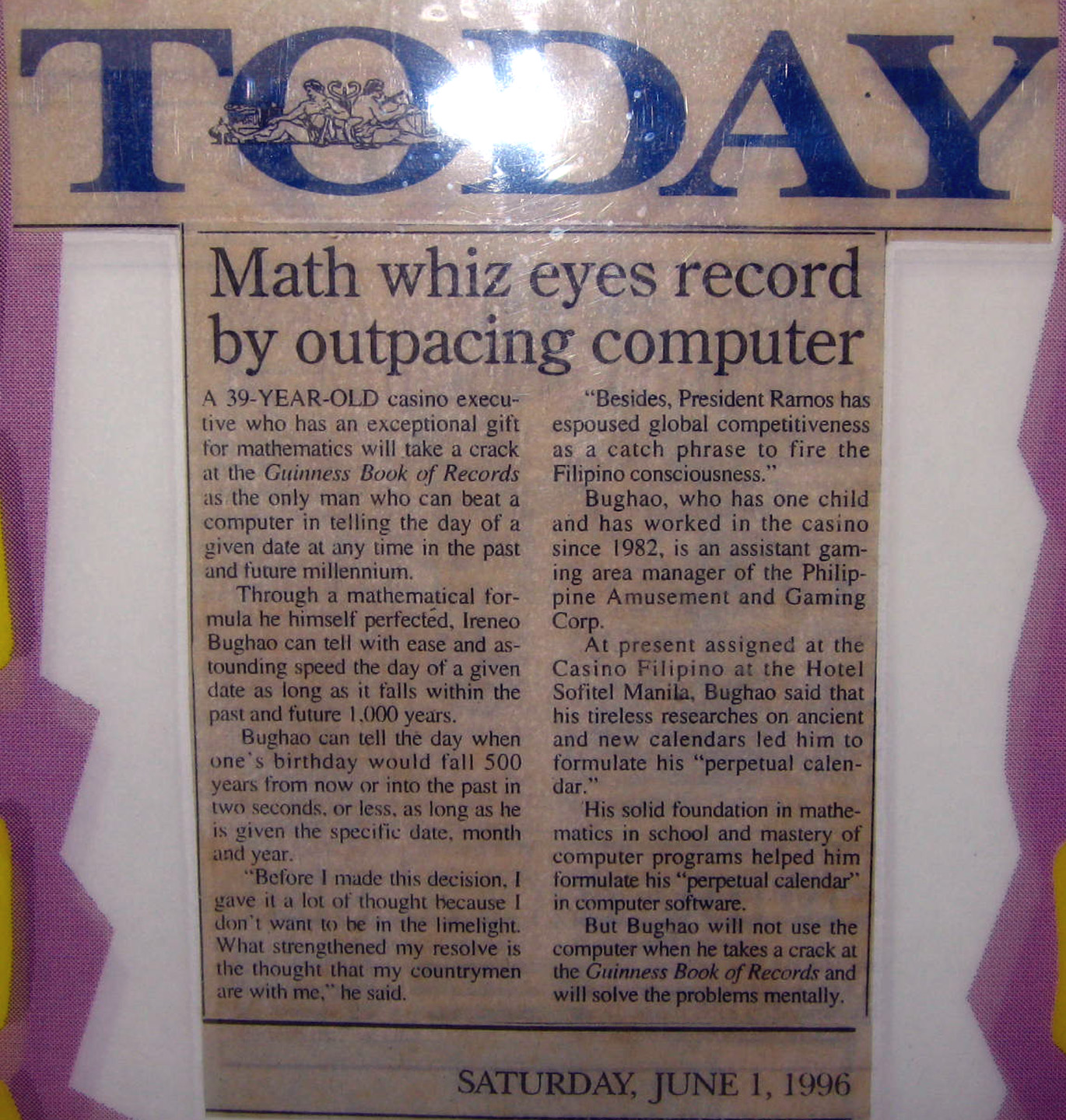
Math whiz eyes record by outpacing computer, Today, June 1, 1996.

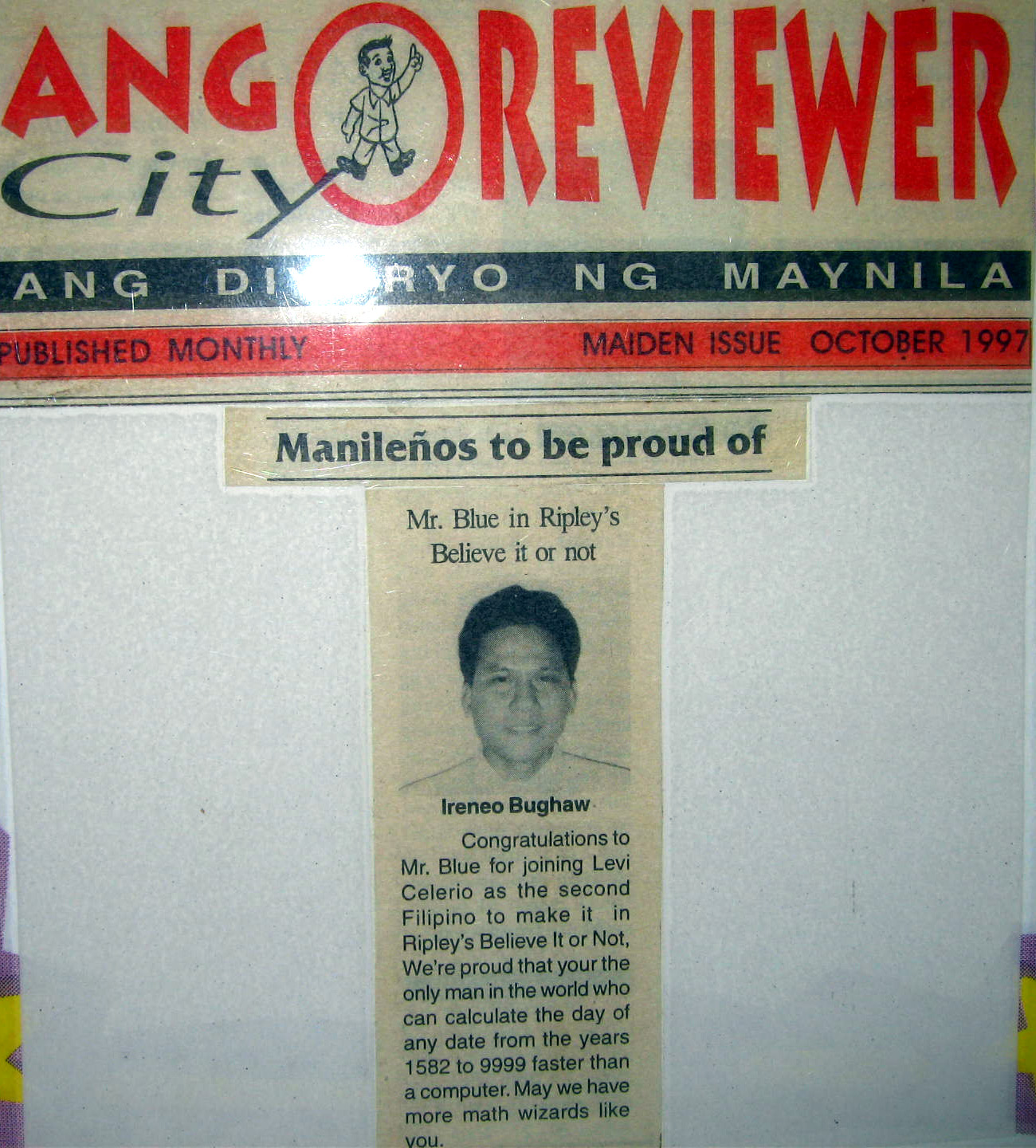
Manilenos to be proud of, Ang City Reviewer, October 1997.
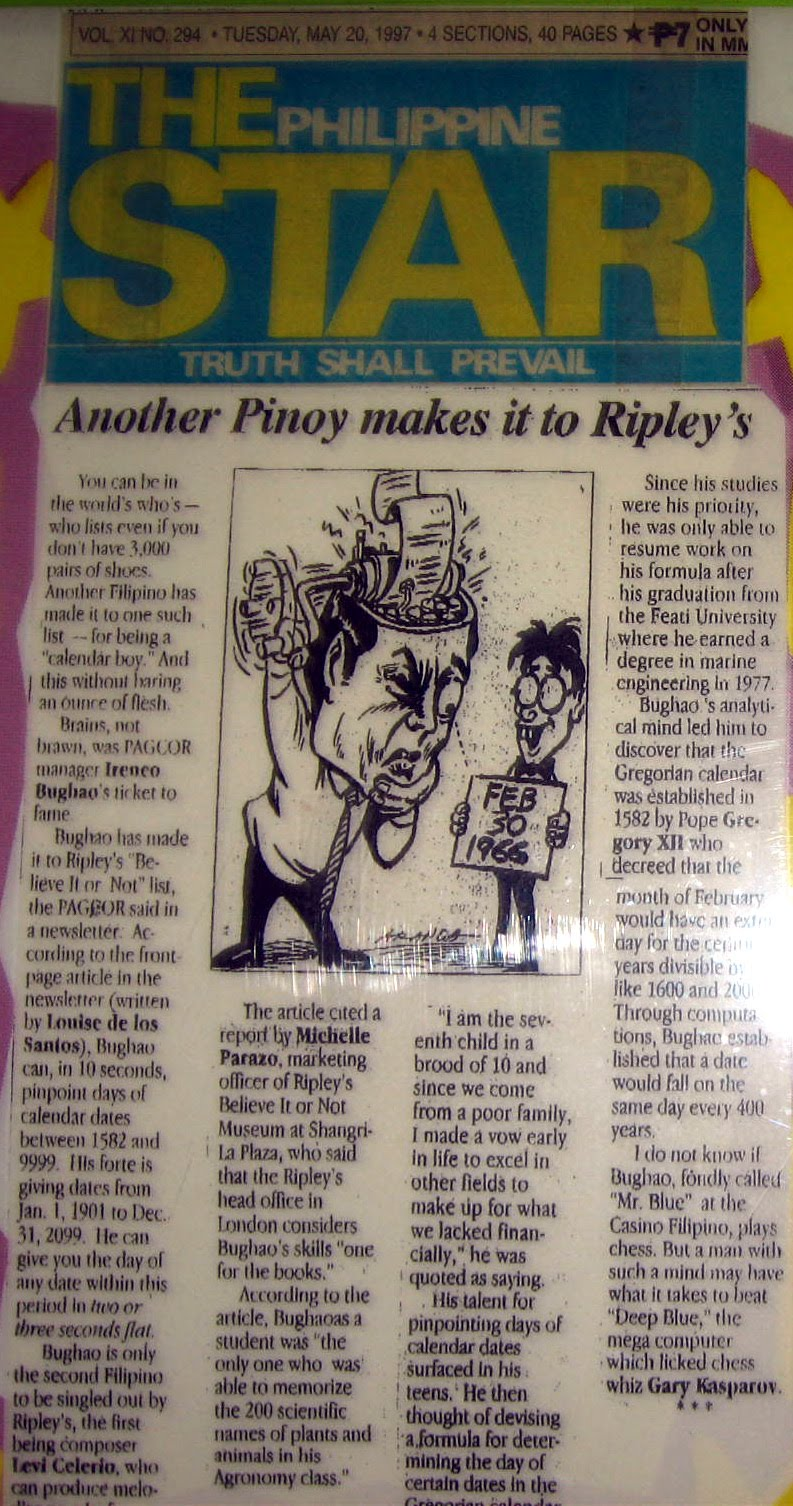
Another Pinoy makes it to Ripley's, May 20, 1997.

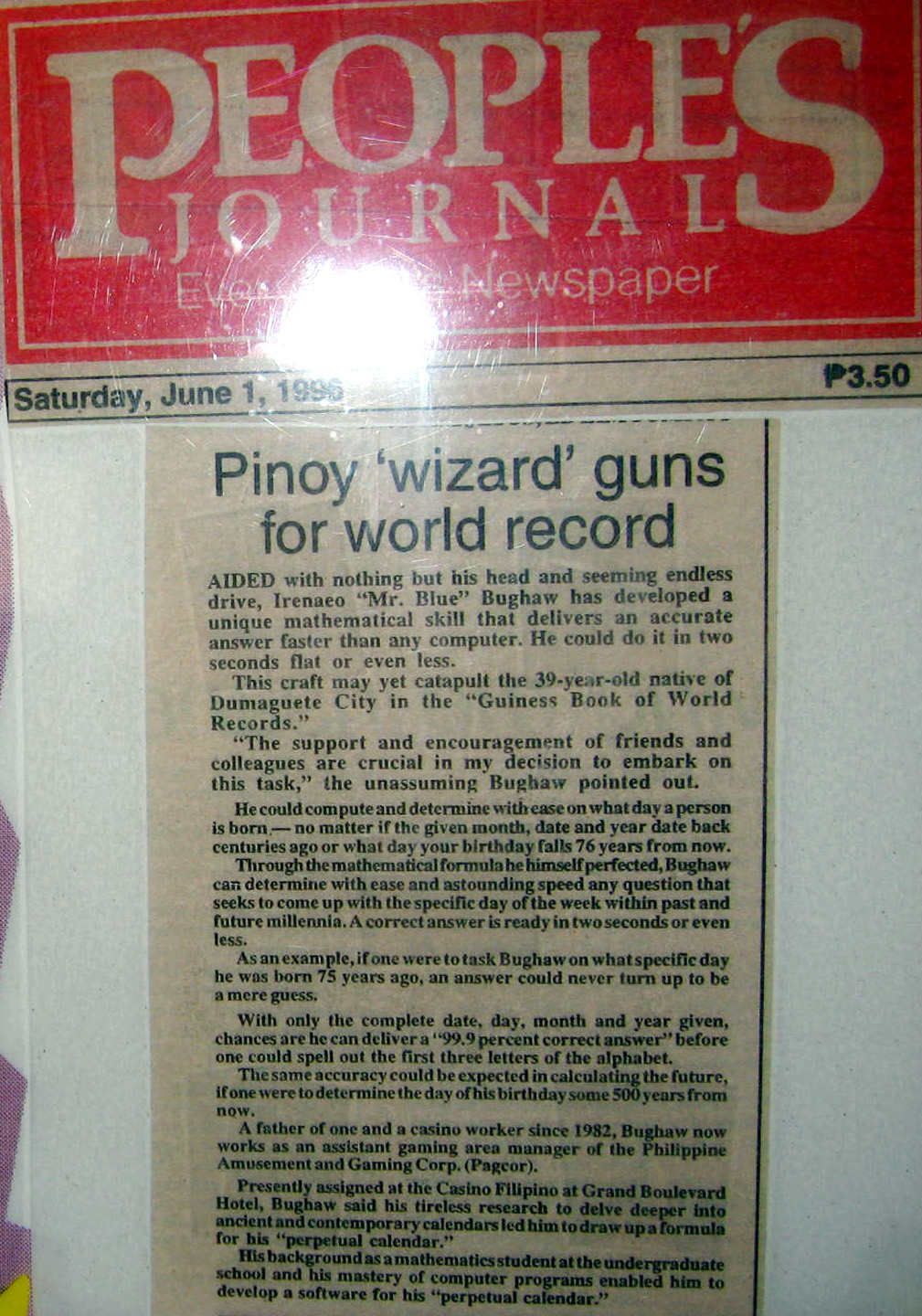
Pinoy wizard guns for world record, People's Journal, June 1, 1996.

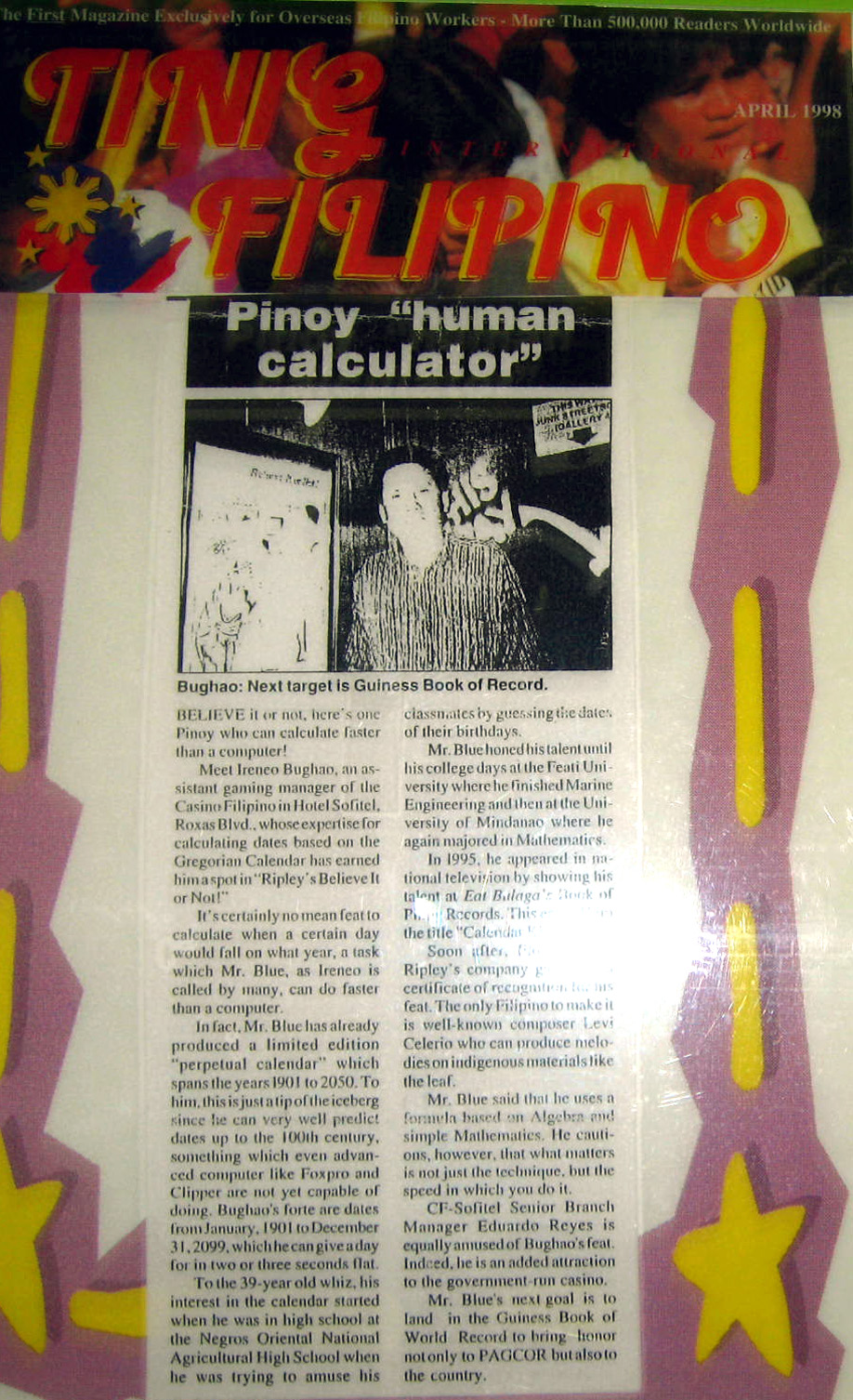
Pinoy human calculator, Tinig Pilipino, April 1998.
