= Signos (film) =

1983 documentary film

Signos (Omens) is a 1983 documentary film that interviewed activists, church members, and artists at the height of protests after the assassination of Ninoy Aquino. The film was made by a collective composed of Mike de Leon and other artists, under the Concerned Artists of the Philippines.

Interviewees included Senator José W. Diokno, journalist Letty Jimenez Magsanoc, Sister Mary Christine Tan and Sister Mariani Dimaranan, and film director Lino Brocka. Parts of the documentary were shot on Super 8 mm film.

Produced during martial law under the dictatorship of Ferdinand Marcos, it depicted the street protests that were censored in the Marcos-controlled mass media.

The documentary was screened at the New York Metropolitan Museum of Art in 2022 as part of a retrospective on the works of Mike de Leon.

De Leon discussed the documentary in his memoir Mike de Leon's Last Look Back.

== See also ==
- List of films about martial law under Ferdinand Marcos
