= Candy Gourlay =

Filipino author based in the United Kingdom

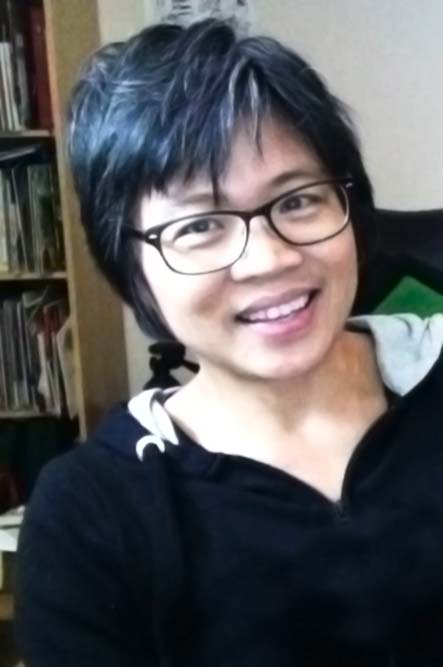
- Gourlay in 2013
- Born: Maria Cristina Lopez Quimpo; Davao City, Philippines
- Education: Ateneo de Manila University, 1984; Saint Theresa's College of Quezon City, 1980
- Occupations: Journalist, writer
- Spouse: Richard Gourlay
- Children: 3
- Writing career
- Period: 2010–present (fiction)
- Genres: Children's Books, Fiction, Middle Grade, Teen Novels, Young Adult
- Notable works: Tall Story (2010), Shine (2013)
- Notable awards: Crystal Kite Prize for Europe; 2014; National Children's Book Award of the Philippines; 2012; Crystal Kite Prize for Europe; 2011
- Website: https://www.candygourlay.co.uk/

Candy Gourlay (née Quimpo) is a Filipino journalist and author based in the United Kingdom whose debut novel Tall Story (2010) was shortlisted for the Carnegie Medal.

== Biography ==
Gourlay was born and raised in the Philippines.

== Career ==
Gourlay at FilBookFest (San Francisco, 2026)

=== Journalist ===
From 1984 to 1989, she worked as a journalist in the Philippines, notably as a staff writer and later associate editor of the weekly opposition tabloid Mr & Ms Special Edition, which played a significant role in the overthrow of the 21 year regime of Filipino dictator Ferdinand Marcos.

Her other positions include:

- 1984, staff writer, Mr & Ms Special Edition (Manila)
- 1985, associate editor, Mr & Ms Special Edition (Manila)
- 1986, desk editor, Philippine Daily Inquirer (Manila)
- 1987, correspondent, Asia Magazine (Manila)
- 1989, staff writer, Marketing Magazine (London)
- 1990, London correspondent, Inter Press Service (London)
- 2005, presenter and writer, Motherless Nation, BBC Radio 4 documentary on the social impact of Philippine migration

=== Author ===
Her debut novel Tall Story (2010) won the National Children's Book Award of the Philippines in 2012 and the Crystal Kite Award for the British Isles in 2011. Tall Story was shortlisted for 13 prizes, notably: the Waterstones Children's Book Prize, the Branford Boase Award, the Blue Peter Book Award and the UKLA Children's Book Prize. It was nominated for the Carnegie Medal.

Her second novel Shine (2013) was longlisted for the Guardian Children's Fiction Prize and won the Crystal Kite Award for the British Isles in 2014.

Bone Talk (2018) was shortlisted for the Costa Book Award and the CILIP Carnegie Medal for Writing.

== Published books ==
- Hinabing Gunita (Woven Memories): Filipinos in the United Kingdom (London: Centre for Filipinos, 2004)
- Animal Tricksters (Oxford University Press, 2010) – OCLC 495598126.
- Tall Story (Oxford: David Fickling Books, 2010)
- Shine (David Fickling, 2013)
- Animal Tricksters (Oxford University Press, 2014)
- Bone Talk (David Fickling, 2018)
- Is it a Mermaid? (Otter-Barry Books, 2018)
- Ferdinand Magellan (Harry N. Abrams, 2020)
- Mike Falls Up (Stripes Publishing, 2022)
- Wild Song (David Fickling, 2023)
- Little Rhino Lost (Crocodile Books, 2025)
