= Don't Stop Believin': Everyman's Journey =

2012 film by Ramona S. Diaz

- Directed by: Ramona S. Diaz
- Produced by: Ramona S. Diaz; Capella Fahoome
- Starring: Journey
- Cinematography: Julia Dengel; Vicente Franco
- Edited by: Leah Marino
- Production companies: Arcady Bay Entertainment; CineDiaz; Defining Entertainment; Game 7 Films Docurama Films
- Distributed by: Cinedigm
- Release dates: April 19, 2012 (Tribeca); March 8, 2013 (United States)
- Running time: 105 minutes
- Country: United States
- Languages: English; Filipino
- Box office: $61,108

Don't Stop Believin': Everyman's Journey is a 2012 American documentary film of the band Journey and its new lead vocalist Arnel Pineda.

== Overview ==
The film shows the band during the Revelation Tour in the United States and Pineda's homecoming in Manila, Philippines where they performed in front of 25,000 people.

== Cast ==
- Neal Schon - Lead Guitar, Vocals
- Ross Valory - Bass, Vocals
- Jonathan Cain - Keyboards, Rhythm Guitar, Vocals
- Deen Castronovo - Drums, Percussion, Vocals
- Arnel Pineda - Lead Vocals
- Katherine Heigl as herself

== Reception ==
Don't Stop Believin': Everyman's Journey received mixed to positive reviews, holding a 62% "fresh" rating on Rotten Tomatoes; the consensus states: "An energetic but thin portrait of the venerable rock band Journey, Don't Stop Believin' gets a boost from new singer Arnel Pineda's charming personality." It has a 53/100 rating on Metacritic, signifying "mixed or average" reviews. The film opened the 2013–2014 season of PBS's Independent Lens, where it won the Audience Award.
