= FEATI University =

Private university in Manila, Philippines

- Former name: Far Eastern Aeronautics School
- Motto: Ars Scientia Manus
- Type: Private, non-sectarian
- Established: March 6, 1946; 80 years ago
- President: Adolfo Jesus R. Gopez
- Location: Helios St., Santa Cruz, Manila, Philippines; 14°35′51″N 120°58′56″E
- Colors: Blue and yellow
- Nickname: Seahawks
- Website: www.featiu.edu.ph
- Location in Manila Location in Metro Manila Location in Luzon Location in the Philippines

FEATI University (Far Eastern Air Transport Incorporated University) is a private non-sectarian co-educational higher education institution with a Catholic orientation established in 1946 in Santa Cruz, Manila, Philippines. FEATI was formerly known as the Far Eastern School of Aeronautics.

== History ==
Salvador Araneta with his wife Victoria Lopez de Araneta founded the Far Eastern Air Transport Incorporated (FEATI), the first airline in the Philippines flying the Iloilo-Manila-Hong Kong route.

The Aranetas decided to close the airline but adopted its name as part of a school they established on March 6, 1946, and named it the FEATI Institute of Technology. The educational institution focused on the fields of engineering and technology. The school was granted university status by the Department of Education in 1959 with Victoria Lopez de Araneta as the first president of FEATI University.

The FEATI University currently occupies as a 5 hectares (12 acres) campus.

== Academics ==
FEATI Bridgepoint

The university's Graduate School offers postgraduate degrees that includes Master of Arts major in College Teaching, Master of Arts major in Educational Administration and Supervision and Master of Science in Management Engineering. The following are the colleges of FEATI University:

- College of Architecture
- School of Fine Arts
- College of Arts, Sciences and Education
- College of Business
- College of Engineering
- College of Maritime Education

== Building ==
The FEATI University building

Fernando Ocampo Sr.’s Paterno Building built in 1929 at the foot of MacArthur Bridge in Santa Cruz and was inspired from Art Deco and Mission Revival architectures . It had a symmetrical rectangular plan with a clean and simple character in design, having blocks of windows organized in a series of regular bays. Two passageways were emphasized by canopies and plain art deco treatment over the second-level windows and on the raised pediments.

== Athletics ==
The FEATI University maintains an athletics program.

In the '07 Nike Summer League, the Seahawks Men's Basketball team succeeded in making it into the quarter-finals but was defeated by more experienced sides De La Salle University- Manila on June 4, 2007. In September 2009, FEATI co-founded the Interscholastic Athletic Association (ISAA) along with other member-schools Manila Adventist Medical Center and Colleges, FEU-East Asia College, Manila Doctors College, La Consolacion College Manila, Philippine Women’s University, Lyceum of the Philippines University and Southville International School and College.

== Notable alumni ==
- Recaredo Albano (BSCE, BSAE, BSGE, MSME), former Chief of Engineers of the Armed Forces of the Philippines (AFP) from 1983 to 1986.
- Rodolfo Biazon (BSME), former Philippine Senator
- Ireneo Bughao (BSMarE, ABMath, MSM) made it to Ripley's Believe It or Not! as the man who can beat the computer in telling the day of any date in the past or future millennia.
- Romulo Espaldon (BSAE), first rear admiral of the Philippine Navy and first governor of Tawi-Tawi Province. Former Philippine Ambassador (Kingdom of Saudi Arabia)
- Dick Israel (BSME), Philippine Actor
- Mariano Zuniega Velarde (BSGE) or better known as Bro. Mike (b. August 20, 1939) is the founder and Servant Leader of the Philippine-based Catholic Charismatic religious group El Shaddai Movement which has a following of an estimated three to seven million Filipinos.
