= ICanServe Foundation =

ICanServe Foundation, Inc.
- Founded: 1999
- Founder: Kara Magsanoc-Alikpala, Crisann Celdran, Becky Fuentes, Bet Lazatin
- Purpose: "Early breast cancer detection"
- Location: Manila, Philippines
- Region served: Philippines
- Method: Promotion of breast self-examination, clinical breast examination, mammography
- Key people: Nikoy de Guzman, President and Crisann Celdran, Chairman
- Website: www.icanservefoundation.org

ICanServe Foundation, Inc., formerly Information on Breast Cancer and Other Services, is a non-stock, non-profit organization that advocates early breast cancer detection through breast self-examination. Based in Manila, Philippines, and co-founded in 1999 by journalist Kara Magsanoc-Alikpala, a breast cancer survivor, the advocacy group empowers women with breast cancer and women cancer-related information so they can have a voice in their own health care. Its mission is to arm women with breast care health and breast cancer information so they can make informed decisions about their health. It also provides access to special services that will help the breast cancer survivor recover and heal more effectively.

ICanServe is not a support group. Although ICanServe provides services to elevate the capabilities of and networks with support groups all over the Philippines, it does not itself conduct regular support group meetings nor does it provide services often expected from support groups such as private talks/seminars and medical/dental clinical missions. Volunteering and/or membership in ICanServe does not prevent volunteers/members from volunteering and/or membership in other organizations, associations, networks and support groups whose mandates or goals do not contradict ICanServe's mission of spreading information and hope.

== Flagship (informational) projects ==
1. Ating Dibdibin - the first community based breast cancer screening program in the Philippines; conducted under the auspices of the American Cancer Society and with a grant from Pfizer Foundation (USA) and Pfizer Foundation Philippines, Ating Dibdibin was first conducted in Marikina City, Metro Manila from June to December 2008; the project facilitates treatment of all women diagnosed with breast cancer during the screening period and aims to make the early detection program permanently included under the local government's health budget; Instructional videos on breast self-examination were produced for Ating Dibdibin (Take Your Breast Care to Heart) narrated by singer and actress Lea Salonga in English and actress Dawn Zulueta in Tagalog. A Visayan-language video was later produced, voiced by Cebu-born singer Raki Vega.

2. Silver Linings (2005, 2008, 2011, 2019) - national homecoming and educational forum for breast cancer survivors, their families and supporters

3. ICanServe handbook (2000, 2002) - a directory of services available to the breast cancer community in the Philippines, first published through a grant from Bristol-Myers Squibb (Phil), Inc.

4. Email/phone hotline - an informational/facilitation service for the cancer community. Celebrity members of the e-group include actresses Maritoni Fernandez and Melissa De Leon Joseph, writer-director Bibeth Orteza and model-trainer Patty Betita.

5. Website - https://www.icanservefoundation.org/ allows ICanServe to reach breast cancer survivors, especially Filipina survivors, across the globe

6. Multimedia campaigns - ICanServe ties up with Philippine broadcast networks to air ICanServe-produced television and radio commercials that promote early breast cancer detection during Breast Cancer Awareness Month (October); ICanServe, in cooperation with C-Network, also produced English-language and Tagalog-language videos that demonstrate self breast examination to support Ating Dibdibin, as well as raise funds for women diagnosed with breast cancer during the program's screening period.

7. Kamay Gabay breast self-exam kits - distributed in 2020 to women in sponsored barangays to remind women that monthly breast self-examination is a simple, non-invasive and effective way to detect breast cancer early; materials include basic facts about breast cancer, myths vs. facts, early detection guidelines by age, risk factors, as well as breast changes to look and feel for; it also includes an illustrated step-by-step procedure on how to accurately conduct a self-exam; a beaded charm demonstrates the average sizes of breast lumps typically found by those who undergo annual check-ups by health practitioners, those who do monthly BSEs, and those who do so occasionally; the largest bead represents the actual size of lumps discovered by accident for those who do not have regular check-ups or self-exams.

8. You Can Do This (A Breast Cancer Patient's Manual) - a free downloadable e-book in English, Filipino, Bisaya, and various local languages first published in 2022; written entirely by breast cancer survivors, the patient manual delivers vital information in a conversational manner to help patients feel less overwhelmed and intimidated; it can be downloaded from https://www.icanservefoundation.org/patients-manual/

== Fund-raising projects ==
1. Tickled Pink (2006, 2007) - bazaar of unique finds

2. Pink Kitchen (2007, 2008) - food festival that gathers premier chefs who want to support breast cancer awareness campaigns

3. Gifts that Give Back - ICanServe-produced year-round gift items available on the https://icanserveshop.com/, proceeds help raise awareness and subsidize medical care for breast cancer patients undergoing treatment; In 2011, model-actress Tweetie de Leon-Gonzales, professional soccer player Yannick Tuason and singer-actress Lea Salonga-Chien helped with the foundation's fund-raising activity by modeling ICanServe-branded merchandise. Tweetie de Leon-Gonzales and Yannick Tuason modeled the ICanServe Be In The Loop T-shirts designed by Team Manila. Lea Salonga-Chien modeled the limited edition ICanServe Swatch. In 2022, actress-model Maureen Wroblewitz, winner of Asia's Next Top Model (season 5) in 2017, modeled the ICanServe 2022 BC Ribbon Map T-shirt.

4. Fashion Can Serve (2015, 2016, 2017) - a fashion show featuring clothes by top Filipino designers modeled by cancer survivors and celebrity advocates

== Other projects/activities ==
1. Collaboration with donors/sponsors - for fund-raising and/or awareness campaigns, ICanServe may be chosen as a beneficiary of socially responsible institutions or individuals for anniversaries or occasional special projects

2. Cancer Chat/Forum - an educational lecture on self breast examination and breast cancer risks, normally sponsored by organizations, corporations, or local government units that donate funds in support of ICanServe's high-impact information campaigns

3. Patient Services - accepts donations of medicines, headwear (wigs, hats, bandannas), prostheses, and cash for distribution (free or with subsidy) to breast cancer patients in target communities

4. ICanServe Facebook Group - online private support group on Facebook (FB) for women cancer survivors (a patient service); it facilitates doctor referrals and is a venue for comparing treatment notes and sharing experiences; over 600 are enrolled (as of February 2024) with members based in the Philippines (Manila, Quezon City, Muntinlupa, Rizal, Davao, Cagayan de Oro, Zamboanga, Bacolod, Baguio), USA, Saudi Arabia, Sweden, South Korea, Saipan, Malaysia, and Singapore

5. Get-togethers - occasional potluck gatherings of FB group members

6. Volunteer opportunities - survivor volunteers serve in ICanServe projects (for fund-raising or awareness) in gratitude for help received while they were in treatment; or as in the case of non-survivors, in honor the struggle of their loved ones who battled or continue to battle cancer

== Advocates ==
In the October 2008 issue of Marie Claire Philippines, the following ICanServe Foundation supporters wore the ICanServe shirt in what was called the Pink Shirt Campaign to raise awareness and advocate early breast cancer detection through breast self-examination: race car driver and TV host Gaby dela Merced; medical oncologist Dr. Malu Tiambeng; singer Bituin Escalante; mother of three Sigalit Djemal; models-and-columnists Isabel Roces and Rissa Mananquil; entrepreneurs Eva Abesamis, Susan Reyes, Crisann Celdran, Ruby Gan and Lucille Locsin; Senator Pia Cayetano; model and environmentalist Bianca Araneta; former Representative Charlie Cojuangco; columnist Mayenne Carmona; singer and Sexy Chef restaurant owner Rachel Alejandro; model and jewelry designer Tweetie de Leon; artist Isa Lorenzo; writer and director Bibeth Orteza; film director Carlitos Siguion Reyna; broadcast journalists Cheche Lazaro and David Celdran; breast surgeon Dr. Diana Cua; fundraiser Frannie Jacinto; actress Melissa de Leon-Joseph; Marikina Mayor Marides Fernando; student and model Isabelle Daza; fashion designer Lulu Tan-Gan; and news anchor and TV host Chiqui Roa-Puno. They also appeared in a video documenting the Pink Shirt Campaign.

== See also ==
- Kara Magsanoc-Alikpala
