= Sag-od massacre =

1981 mass murder in the Philippines

The Sag-od massacre, also known as the Las Navas massacre, was the mass murder of 45 men, women and children in Barrio Sag-od in Las Navas, Northern Samar, on September 15, 1981, by 18 heavily armed security men of the San Jose Timber Corp. (under the behest of Juan Ponce Enrile) who were also members of the Special Forces of the Civilian Home Defense Force (CHDF).

== Incident ==
In the early hours of September 15. Residents of Las Navas woke up hearing gunfire. Men immediately ordered civilians to attend a meeting in front of the captain's house, where two lines were formed, separating men, women, and children.

== See also ==
- Martial law under Ferdinand Marcos
