= Human Rights Violations Victims' Memorial Commission =

Philippine government agency

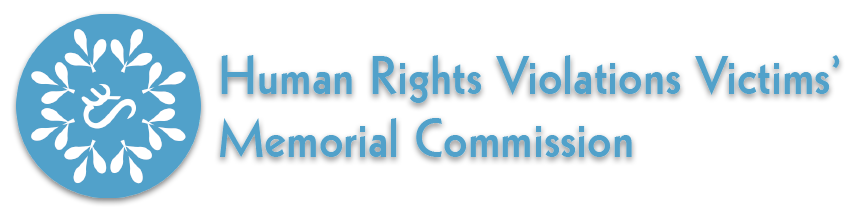

Government Agency overview
- Formed: February 25, 2013; 13 years ago
- Headquarters: 4/F, 150 Corporate Center, Panay Ave., Brgy. South Triangle, Diliman, Quezon City, Philippines; 14°14.642405′N 121°10.036810′E
- Employees: 46
- Government Agency executives: Richard Palpal-latoc, Chairperson; Regalado T.Jose, Co-Chairperson
- Website: hrvvmc.gov.ph

The Human Rights Violations Victims’ Memorial Commission (HRVVMC) is a Philippine government agency mandated to memorialise the victims of human rights abuses committed during the Marcos dictatorship, and to promote the integration of Martial Law–related human rights education into the country's basic education curricula.

It is also tasked with forming the Freedom Memorial Museum at University of the Philippines Diliman. It was established under Section 27 together with the quasi-judicial agency the Human Rights Victims’ Claims Board (HRVCB) in Republic Act No. 10368, and was signed by President Benigno Aquino III on February 25, 2013.

== Functions ==
The HRVVMC is responsible for the establishment, restoration, preservation, and conservation of a memorial complex—encompassing a Museum, Library, Archive, and online Compendium—honoring victims of human rights violations during the Marcos dictatorship. It also ensures these materials are accessible online and displayed in other government venues.

The government agency is attached to communicate with the Department of Education and the Commission on Higher Education in teaching about martial law in the Philippines, especially the brutalities, torture, and human rights victims in order to inculcate the youth. Meanwhile, the HRVCB is tasked to seek awards and indemnities, as well as prosecute against cronies who worked under the martial law regime.

== Roll of Victims ==
A dedicated Roll of Human Rights Victims (HRVs) was created by the Human Rights Victims’ Claims Board (HRVCB), with the agency tasked to immortalize these individuals in both physical and digital memorials. It officially lists 11,229 state-recognized victims including 126 individuals honored motu proprio by the Human Rights Victims’ Claims Board (HRVCB).

== Composition ==
The agency is governed by a board of trustees, as established under Section 27 of Republic Act No. 10368, mainly responsible for setting policy directions.

The Board is composed of the following members:

- The Chairperson of the Commission on Human Rights - serving as Chairperson of the Board
- The Chairperson of the National Historical Commission of the Philippines – acting as Co-Chairperson
- The Secretary of the Department of Education – Member
- The Chairperson of the Commission on Higher Education – Member
- The Chairperson of the National Commission for Culture and the Arts – Member
- The Head of the University of the Philippines Diliman Main Library – Member

The Commission is administratively attached to the Commission on Human Rights, which provides oversight in terms of budget and administrative functions. Its operational funding is appropriated through the national General Appropriations Act, ensuring that the Commission functions within the framework of public accountability and fiscal transparency.
