= A Thousand Cuts (2020 film) =

2020 Filipino-American film by Ramona S. Diaz

- Official poster
- Directed by: Ramona S. Diaz
- Written by: Ramona S. Diaz
- Produced by: Julie Goldman; Christopher Clements; Carolyn Hepburn; Ramona Diaz; Leah Marino
- Cinematography: Gabriel Goodenough; Jeffrey Johnson
- Edited by: Leah Marino
- Music by: Sam Lipman
- Production companies: Concordia Studio; Topic Studios; CineDiaz; Luminate; Motto Pictures
- Distributed by: PBS Distribution
- Release dates: January 25, 2020 (Sundance); August 7, 2020 (United States)
- Running time: 99 minutes
- Countries: Philippines; United States
- Language: English

A Thousand Cuts is a 2020 Philippine-American documentary film about Maria Ressa, the founder of the online news site Rappler. Directed by Ramona Diaz, it explores the conflicts between the press and the Filipino government under President Rodrigo Duterte.

The film had its world premiere at the Sundance Film Festival on January 25, 2020. It was released in the United States in a limited release and in virtual cinemas on August 7, 2020, by PBS Distribution, and was followed by a broadcast on the program Frontline on January 8, 2021.

== Synopsis ==
The documentary focuses on press freedom in the Philippines and the conflicts between the press and the government, especially under President Rodrigo Duterte, as well as the role of social media in politics. It primarily follows Maria Ressa, founder of the online news site Rappler which initiated investigative reporting of extrajudicial killings as well as alleged abuses and corruption during Duterte's war on drugs; as well as the risks they had faced, including Ressa being subjected to scrutiny by Duterte and his supporters.

It also follows writers for the website including Pia Ranada, Patricia Evangelista and Rambo Talabong; Mocha Uson, Samira Gutoc, and Bato dela Rosa as they campaign for seats in the Philippine Senate.

== Release ==
The film had its world premiere at the Sundance Film Festival on January 25, 2020. It was also set to screen at South by Southwest in March 2020, however, the festival was cancelled due to the COVID-19 pandemic.

PBS Distribution and Frontline acquired U.S. distribution rights to the film and briefly made the film available without charge for a limited time on YouTube for Philippine users on June 12 (Independence Day). It was also screened at AFI Docs on June 19, 2020.

The film was released in the United States through virtual cinema on August 7, 2020, followed by its Frontline broadcast on January 8, 2021.

Diaz later revealed in The Washington Post interview that Frontline purchased the film's distribution rights for the Philippines as no broadcaster in the country was willing to air the documentary. Nevertheless, upon availability on YouTube, the documentary gained over 230,000 views within 24 hours.

== Reception ==
A Thousand Cuts received positive reviews from film critics. It holds a 100% approval rating on review aggregator website Rotten Tomatoes, based on the 40 reviews, with an average of 8.2/10. The site's critical consensus reads, "A sobering documentary and a stark warning, A Thousand Cuts underscores the importance of the press at a pivotal moment in world history." On Metacritic, the film holds a rating of 81 out of 100, based on 8 critics, indicating "universal acclaim".

== Awards ==
A Thousand Cuts was named the best international feature at Doc Edge in New Zealand in June 2020, and was the recipient of the David Carr Award at the Montclair Film Festival in New Jersey in October. The documentary was among the three Filipino awardees for the 36th Los Angeles Asian Pacific Film Festival in the same month, where it was given a Global Impact Award (Documentary Feature).

In January 2021, the documentary was named one of the two Best Documentary recipients at the 30th Gotham Awards, and was later selected Best Documentary Feature in the inaugural Gold List.

In 2022, it was given three recognitions: in May, the annual Robert F. Kennedy Journalism Award in the International TV category; in June, that year's Peabody Award in the documentary category; and in September, the Outstanding Social Issue Documentary at the annual News and Documentary Emmys. The first two were the Frontline's twentieth and twenty-seventh wins from the said award-giving bodies, respectively.

Aside from awards, the documentary was named one of The Unforgettables, a non-competitive honor, in the 13th Cinema Eye Honors in New York City in March 2021. It was given special mention for the Grand Prix – Bank Millennium Award at the 18th edition of Millennium Docs Against Gravity in September.

The documentary was among those honored at the National Commission for Culture and the Arts 2023 Ani ng Dangal awarding ceremony, held in Malacañang Palace in the Philippines on February 22.

It was nominated for the Best Documentary at the 2021 Gawad Urian Awards.

== See also ==
- Freedom of the press
- Censorship
- Online journalism
