= Freedom Memorial Museum =

- Location: University of the Philippines Diliman, Quezon City, Philippines
- Type: History museum

The Freedom Memorial Museum is a planned museum to be built inside the University of the Philippines Diliman campus in Quezon City, Metro Manila, Philippines. It will feature exhibits related to the martial law era under 10th President Ferdinand Marcos.

== History ==
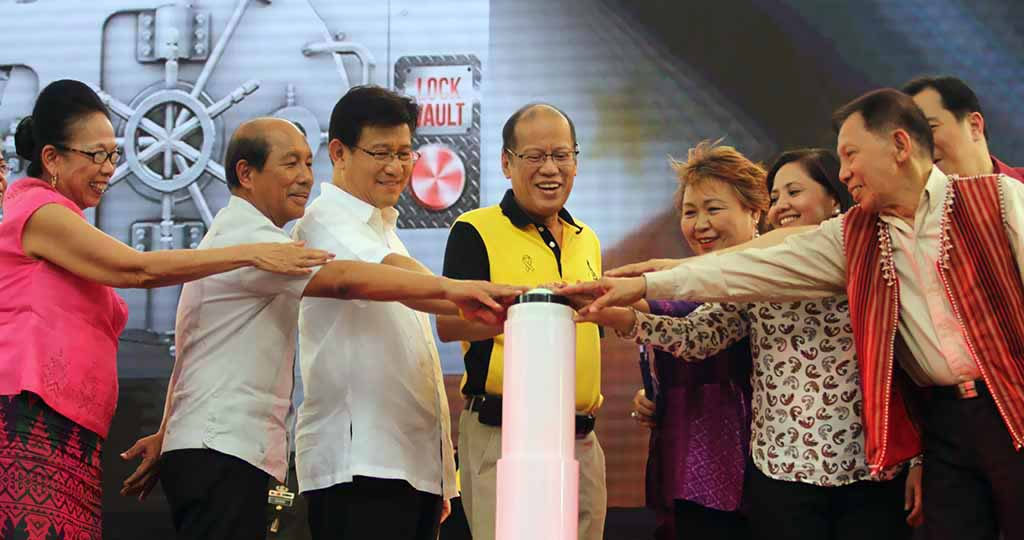
President Benigno Aquino III (center) leads the launching of the museum in April 2016

The Freedom Memorial Museum is a project of the Human Rights Violations Victims' Memorial Commission (HRVVMC), a body created under Republic Act No. 10368. The legislation also known as the "Human Rights Victims Reparation and Recognition Act" was signed into law in 2013 by then President Benigno Aquino III. The HRVVMC is tasked to educate the youth about the excesses of President Ferdinand Marcos' administration as well as the opposition against his regime.

The HRVVMC, in cooperation with the United Architects of the Philippines, held a design competition for a museum which will be dedicated to the martial law era in the Philippines. Five final designs were shortlisted from 106 entries with "Fall of Brutal" design by architects Mark Anthony Pait, Mark Angelo Bonita and Wendell Crispo selected as the winning entry on August 21, 2019.

The HRVVMC opened the bidding for the construction of the museum on September 21, 2020. The museum was initially projected to open on September 23, 2022, which coincides with the 50th anniversary of the declaration of martial law over the country by President Marcos. The groundbreaking ceremony for the museum was held on December 15, 2024.

== Architecture and design ==
The Freedom Memorial Museum will be built inside the University of the Philippines Diliman campus in Quezon City. The museum building will be erected beside the College of Fine Arts Gallery.

The museum's design is a result of a design competition with the winning entry being "Fall of Brutal" by a team consisting of architects Mark Anthony Pait, Mark Angelo Bonita and Wendell Crispo. The museum will exhibit Brutalist architecture which is a common style adopted by infrastructure projects built by President Marcos' administration such as the Cultural Center of the Philippines and the Philippine International Convention Center.

The museum’s facade is designed to resemble a clenched fist, symbolizing resistance, with floral patterns inspired by ikat, patadyong, Moro and T'boli textiles, signifying the "beauty of democracy unfolding": or the years of resistance against the Marcos administration which culminated with the People Power Revolution of 1986.

The surrounding landscape of the building was patterned after dried land to represent the negative impact of Marcos' decades-long rule.
