= Ramona Diaz =

Filipino-American documentary filmmaker

Ramona S. Diaz
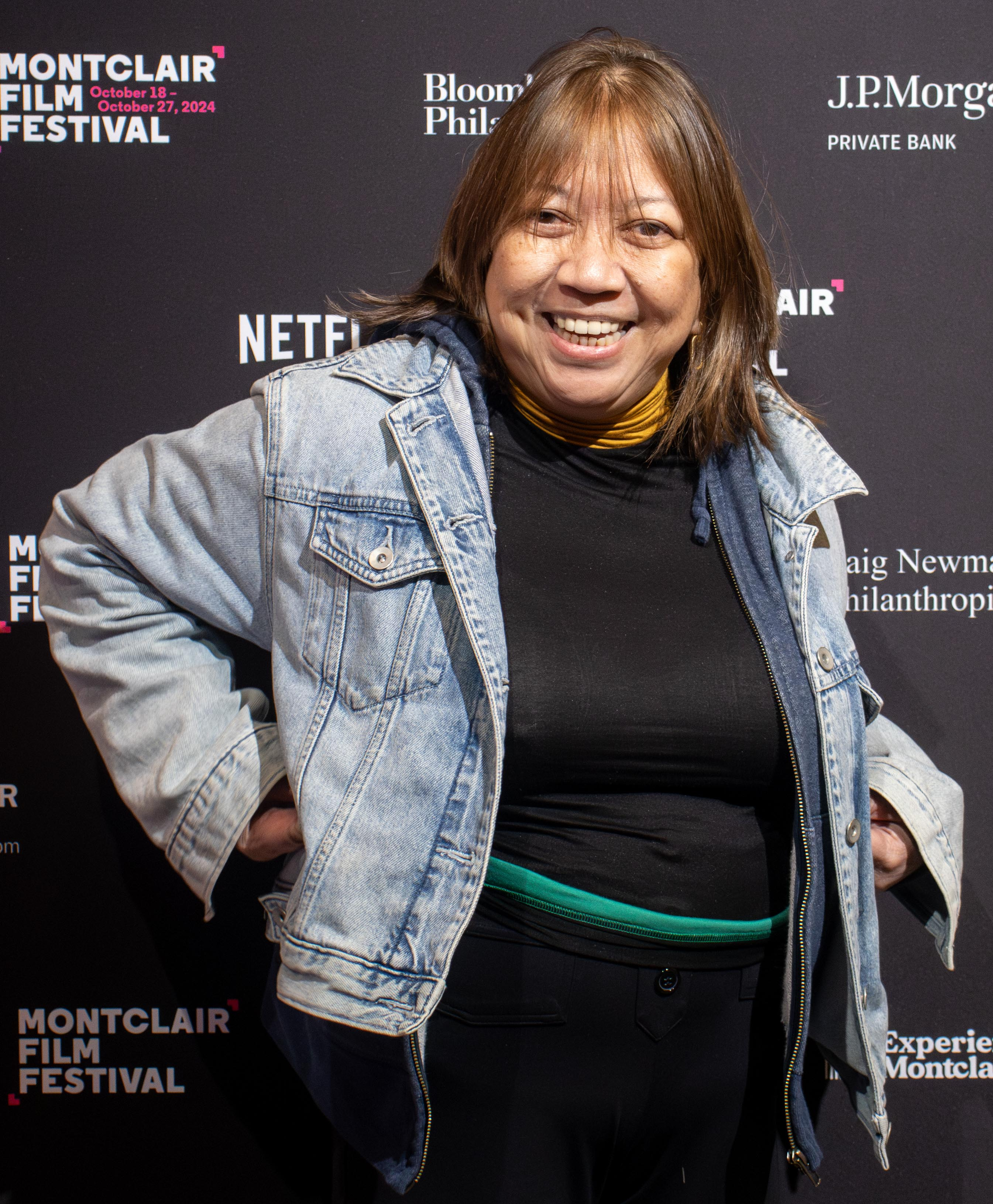
- Diaz at the Montclair Film Festival in 2024
- Education: Emerson College (B.A.); Stanford University (M.A.)
- Occupation: Filmmaker
- Notable work: Imelda
- Style: Documentary

Ramona S. Diaz is a Filipino-American documentary film director and producer best known for creating "character-driven documentaries". Her notable works include the 2012 film Don't Stop Believin': Everyman's Journey, featuring the band Journey and its new lead vocalist Arnel Pineda, which won the Audience Award for the 2013–2014 season of PBS's Independent Lens; and the 2003 film Imelda, about the life of Imelda Marcos, former First Lady of the Philippines.

Three of Diaz's films have screened at the Sundance Film Festival: Imelda, a biographical documentary about Imelda's beginnings as a beauty contest winner to the wife of rising politician and eventual President of the Philippines, Ferdinand Marcos. Motherland, a documentary set at an overcrowded and under-resourced maternity hospital in Manila; and most recently A Thousand Cuts a profile of Nobel laureate Maria Ressa, a journalist working in the Philippines, released in 2020. Motherland received a Special Jury Award at Sundance in 2017 and premiered the same year at the Berlin International Film Festival. Diaz served as a Documentary Competition Juror at the 2023 Sundance Film Festival.

Diaz's most recent feature documentary, And So It Begins, was selected to premiere at the 2024 Sundance Film Festival and was chosen by the Film Academy of the Philippines as the Philippines' entry to the 97th Academy Awards.

In 2019 Diaz received a United States Artists (USA) Fellowship.

== Filmography ==
- 1997 Spirits Rising
- 2003 Imelda
- 2011 Give Up Tomorrow (as Executive Producer)
- 2011 The Learning (episode in P.O.V.)
- 2013 Don't Stop Believin': Everyman's Journey (episode in Independent Lens)
- 2017 Motherland
- 2020 A Thousand Cuts
- 2024 And So It Begins

== Awards ==
Year	Award	Festival	Film
2013	Audience Award	Palm Springs International Film Festival	Don't Stop Believin': Everyman's Journey
2017	Viktor Award	Munich International Documentary Festival (DOK.fest)	Motherland
2017	Editing Award	Sundance Film Festival	Motherland
2020	DocEdge Award	Documentary Edge Festival	A Thousand Cuts
