= Kara Magsanoc-Alikpala =

Philippine broadcast journalist

- Born: Kara Magsanoc; Philippines
- Occupations: Broadcast journalist activist
- Employer(s): CNN, Asianeye
- Known for: Founding the ICanServe Foundation
- Spouse: Dondi Alikpala
- Parent(s): Carlitos & Letty Jimenez Magsanoc

Kara Magsanoc-Alikpala is a Filipino broadcast journalist who produces news documentaries, best known for her work as a producer of Filipino-Australia co-produced documentary film Delikado (2022) by POV, which one of their staffs herself nominated the News and Documentary Emmy Award for Outstanding Investigative Documentary, making her the first Filipino to be nominated with this category.

== Early life ==
Magsanoc-Alikpala is the daughter of Philippine Daily Inquirer editor Letty Jimenez Magsanoc and Dr. Carlitos Magsanoc. Both of her brothers are doctors.

== Journalism career ==
Magsanoc-Alikpala was a managing director of Asianeye Productions as well as a producer for ARD German television and a contributing producer to CNN. Asianeye made an extensive documentary on martial law called Batas Militar which got the "highest rating for any television documentary in the Philippines," according to one newspaper account. She was a reporter for Voice of America and the Australian Broadcasting Corporation. Asianeye developed shows called "docu-musicals" for ABS-CBN's A Christmas Prayer, and the firm won awards on several occasions. In 2007, the Asianeye staff watched 200 movies made by the Philippine action movie star Fernando Poe, Jr. as part of an effort to make a TV special; Magsanoc-Alikpala divided the work to select footage for their project. She has produced and reported for documentaries through the Philippine Center for Investigative Journalism, The Probe Team and for SkyCable News. As a broadcast journalist, she reported on significant stories, such as the capture of four Abu Sayyaf members in 2002; her reports were broadcast on the Voice of America.

== Breast cancer and ICanServe ==
In 1997, Magsanoc-Alikpala was diagnosed with breast cancer. It was a transformative event in her life. She survived, but the experience changed her. In 1999, she started the I Can Serve Foundation along with her friend Crisann Celdran who wrote "we knew very little and had different experiences but shared one dream: that cancer survivors should not go through this path alone." She encourages women to make breast self-examination a "lifetime habit." According to one source, the Philippines has the highest incidence of breast cancer in Southeast Asia.

She founded ICanServe Foundation, an advocacy organization which has the mission of arming "women with breast care health and breast cancer information through high impact campaigns." It has been described as a "dynamic patient support networking group" and has been lauded for its efforts to alleviate the rising incidence of breast cancer among Filipino women. One woman who survived breast cancer joined ICanServe afterwards, and she described Magsanoc-Alikpala as "pretty", "perky", and "talented" and wrote Magsanoc-Alikpala's efforts to organize fellow survivors was a "miracle". In 2004, Magsanoc-Alikpala was awarded the Bessie B. Legarda Memorial Foundation Award. The foundation had its tenth anniversary in 2007. She published advice about how to organize cancer support groups.

The organization, along with the Philippine Cancer Society, organizes a variety of initiatives to promote awareness, including "fun runs" since 2002 in such cities as Fort Bonifacio Global City in Taguig. Magsanoc-Alikpala works with government officials including Philippine Senate President Manny Villar to promote awareness. It promotes awareness with local officials such as in Marikina. Its "Pink Kitchen" creative promotional effort, credited as the idea of Bettina Osmena, features top chefs serving fine cuisine; the events are well publicized in the media. The Pink Kitchen event has been described as "one of Manila’s most anticipated food festivals; the 2008 event showcased over 50 chefs serving French, Italian, Spanish, Middle Eastern, Indian, Burmese, Japanese, Thai, Indonesian and Singaporean specialties. One chef named a new dish after her; chef Sincioco’s Tickled Pink Salad a la Kara featured beetroots and a dark pink tinge in a "fuchsia concoction." In 2006, the organization planned the Philippine's first nationwide early breast cancer detection effort.

In addition, Magsanoc-Alikpala is the managing director of Manila-based Asianeye Productions and a contributing producer to CNN. She was selected as one of three celebrity critics for the Philippine reality-show "Dokyu".

== Celebrity and awards ==
In 2007, Magsanoc-Alikpala was chosen as one of three celebrity critics on a popular Philippine television show Dokyu which has an "eclectic panel" of experts examining film projects. The TV program is a competition-based reality program which gives a platform to independent documentary filmmakers. She offers advice and encouragement to aspiring talents.

In 2008, Magsanoc-Alikpala won a Balance Award from the magazine Working Mom which recognized balance between career and family; a reporter described Magsanoc-Alikpala's efforts as "indefatigable ... as chairperson of the breast cancer awareness support group."

== Personal life ==
She lives and works in Manila.

== Filmography ==
- Batas Militar (as executive producer; 1997)
- Limampung Taong Ligawan: The Pinoy TV Story (2003)
- The Assassination of Ninoy Aquino (2010)
- Marcos: The Downfall of the Dictator (2011)
- 11,103 (as producer; 2022)
- Delikado (2022)
