= Nick Deocampo =

Filipino filmmaker and writer

Nicolas Armada Deocampo
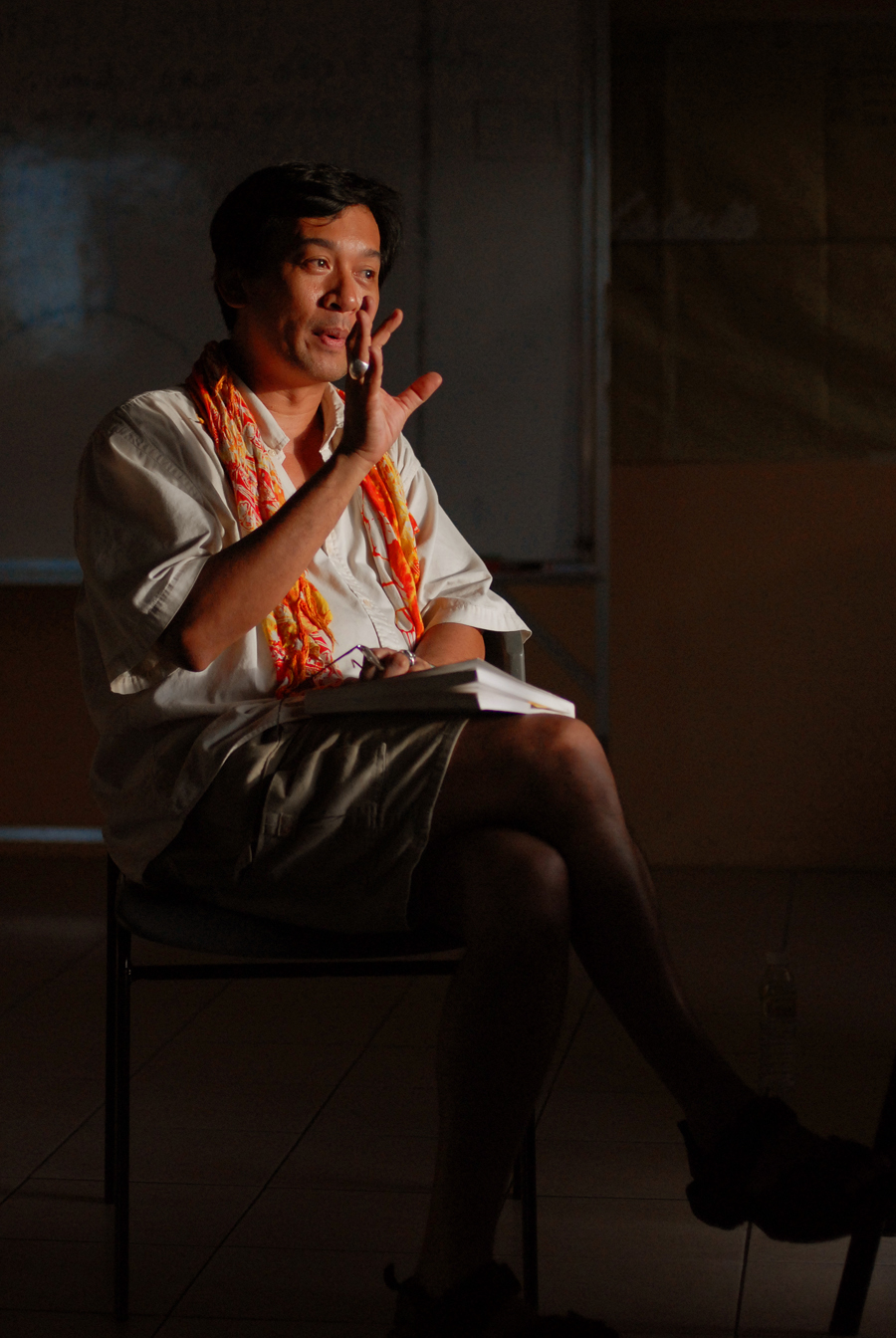
- Nick Deocampo, a noted Filipino film historian, director and writer
- Born: 1959 (age 66–67); Mina, Iloilo near Iloilo City, Philippines

Nicolas Armada Deocampo (born 1959), best known as Nick Deocampo, is a Filipino filmmaker, film historian, film literacy advocate, film producer, author and the director of the Center for New Cinema.

== Education ==
Deocampo completed his elementary education at the basic education unit of West Visayas State University and finished salutatorian at Iloilo High School in 1976. He graduated cum laude with a bachelor's degree in Theater Arts at the University of the Philippines Diliman (UP) in 1981. In 1982, after his university studies, he obtained a scholarship from the French government to study at Atelier de formation au cinéma direct (now Ateliers Varan), a crucial experience in his career. Under a Fulbright Scholarship Grant, Deocampo earned his Master of Arts degree in Cinema Studies at New York University in 1989. He was also a French government scholar and received his Certificate in Film at the Atelier du Formacion Au Cinema in 1989. He received another Fulbright grant as an international senior research fellow at the U.S. Library of Congress in Washington, D.C. in 2001.

He has also held several academic positions and received several awards including:

- Scholar-in-residence, New York University
- Chancellor’s Most Distinguished Lecturer, University of California Irvine
- International Fellow, University of Iowa
- International Fellow, Japan Foundation
- Travel Grantee, Asia Society (New York)
- Fellow, British Council
- Artist-in-residence, Walker Arts Center (Minnesota)
- Asian Public Intellectual (API) Fellow, Nippon Foundation
- Four-time Recipient of the National Book Award, Manila Critics Circle / National Book Development Board
- UP Professor in Teaching and Creative Work, University of the Philippines
- Recipient of Premio Casa Asia, Casa Asia

== Career ==
He was named one of the Ten Outstanding Young Men of the Philippines in 1992. A year later, he was recognized in Japan as one of the Ten Outstanding Young Persons of the World. His contributions were honored with a Lifetime Achievement Award from the Filipino Academy of Movie Arts and Sciences Awards (FAMAS), and a Lamberto Avellana Award from the Film Academy of the Philippines. Deocampo also made it to the Who's Who of the 21st Century by the International Biographical Society in England.

In 1999, Deocampo organized the Pink Film Festival, the first international gay and lesbian festival in the Philippines.

As of 2023, Deocampo works at the University of the Philippines Film Institute as an associate professor.

== Works ==
=== Cinema Books ===
- Sine Tala: Vol. 1: Philippine Cinema and History (Quezon City: Ateneo de Manila University Press and Film Development Council of the Philippines, 2023)
- Sine Tala: Vol. 2: Philippine Cinema and Culture (Quezon City: Ateneo de Manila University Press and Film Development Council of the Philippines, 2023)
- Sine Tala: Vol. 3: Philippine Cinema and Literacy (Quezon City: Ateneo de Manila University Press and Film Development Council of the Philippines, 2023)
- Alternative Cinema: The Un-chronicled History of Alternative Cinema in the Philippines (Quezon City: University of the Philippines Press and Film Development Council of the Philippines, 2021)
- Keeping Memories: Cinema and Archiving in Asia-Pacific (Editor) (Quezon City: SEAPAVAA, Film Development Council of the Philippines, Vietnam Film Institute, Ateneo de Manila Press, 2021)
- Cinema as Response to the Nation (Co-Author) (Busan: Busan International Film Festival, September 2018).
- Early Cinema in Asia (Editor) (Bloomington: Indiana University Press, October 2017). [International Publication Award, University of the Philippines, 2017]
- Eiga: Cinema in the Philippines during World War II (Mandaluyong City: Anvil Publishing, Inc., 2016).
- Film: American Influences on Philippine Cinema (Mandaluyong City: Anvil Publishing, Inc., 2011).
- SineGabay: A Film Study Guide (Pasig City: Anvil Publishing, Inc., 2008).
- Lost Films of Asia (Editor) (Pasig City: Anvil Publishing, Inc., 2006).
- Films from a “Lost” Cinema: A Brief History of Cebuano Cinema (Quezon City: Mowelfund Film Institute, 2005)
- Cine: Spanish Influences on Early Cinema in the Philippines (Manila: National Commission for Culture and the Arts, 2003).
- Beyond the Mainstream: The Films of Nick Deocampo (Manila: Anvil Publishing, Inc., 1996).
- El Cortometraje: Surgimiento de un nuevo cine Filipino (Certamen int’l. de cine documental Bilbao, España, 1986).
- Short Film: Emergence of a New Philippine Cinema (Manila: Communication Foundation for Asia, 1985).
- Movement Magazine (Editor) (Mowelfund Film Institute, 1985 - 1987 / 1992 / 2004-2006).

=== Writings ===
He is currently working on a five-volume history of Philippine cinema. Its first installment is Cine: Spanish Influences on Early Cinema in the Philippines (Manila: National Commission for Culture and the Arts, 2003) which won him his second National Book Award. The second volume will focus on Philippine cinema during the American period.

Several of his articles have been published in international publications, such as:

- Encyclopedia of Early Cinema, edited by Richard Abel (Routledge Press: London and New York)
- Vestiges of War (The Philippine–American War and the Aftermath of an Imperial Dream, 1899-1999), edited by Angel Shaw and Luis Francia (New York University Press, USA)
- Queer Looks, edited by Martha Gever, John Greyson and Pratibha Parmar (Routledge Press, London and New York)
- Documentary Box, published by the Yamagata International Documentary Film Festival (Japan)
- Making Documentaries and News Features in the Philippines, edited by James Kenny and Isabel Enriquez Kenny (Anvil Press, Philippines)
- Sine Gabay: A Film Study Guide (Anvil Press, Philippines).

=== Documentaries ===
- Children of the Regime (1985)
- Revolutions Happen Like Refrains in a Song (1987)
