= Aurora Parong =

Filipino physician, human rights advocate, and Martial Law survivor

Dr. Aurora Corazon A. Parong is a Filipino physician, human rights advocate, and Martial Law survivor best known for her long tenure as Executive Director of Amnesty International Philippines and her work with Task Force Detainees of the Philippines (TFDP) and the Medical Action Group (MAG), documenting human rights violations and providing medical assistance to political detainees during the Marcos dictatorship.

A medical student when Marcos declared martial law in 1972, Parong dedicated the early part of her career to community health efforts in marginalized rural communities. She eventually established a rural health clinic in Bayombong, Nueva Vizcaya, in April 1982. Just a few months later, on July 6, 1982, the Philippine Constabulary arrested her on the basis of a Presidential Commitment Order which accused her of inciting rebellion and treating anti-government insurgents - an accusation for which she was eventually exonerated in 1986. Released after a year and a half in 1984, she joined the Medical Action Group, an organization of health workers advocating for the defense human rights.

After the Marcoses were deposed by the People Power Revolution in 1986, Parong was asked to be the Executive Director of the Medical Action Group. From 2007 to 2014 she was the Executive Director of Amnesty International Philippines, and from 2014 to 2018, President Benigno Aquino III appointed her as part of the newly formed Human Rights Victims' Claims Board (HRVCB), which successfully recognized and distributed reparations to 11,103 of the Marcos' regime's human rights violation victims.

== See also ==
- Etta Rosales
