= Mr & Ms Special Edition =

Mr. & Ms. Special Edition
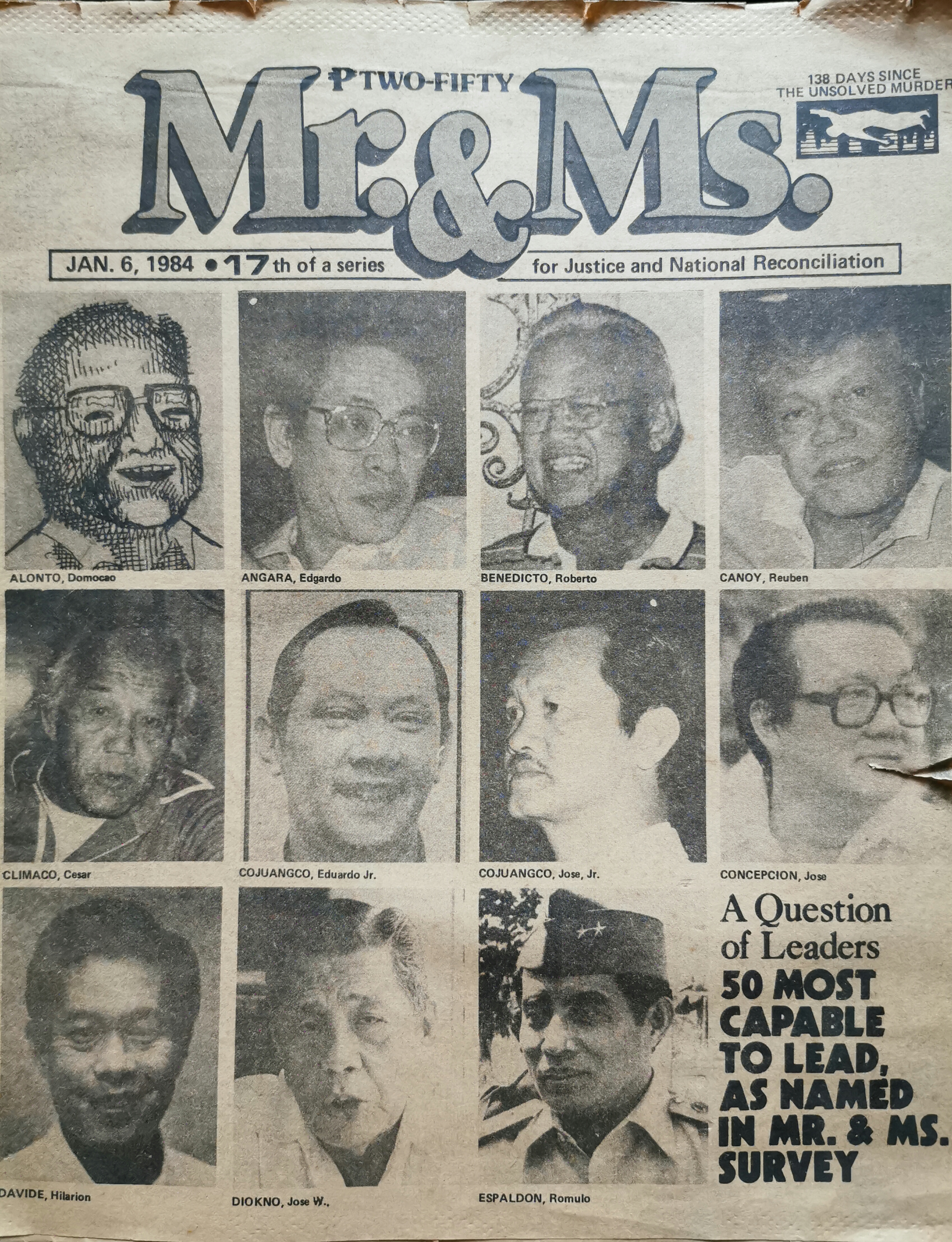
- Front page from January 6, 1984
- Type: Weekly tabloid
- Founder: Eugenia D. Apostol
- Editor: Letty Jimenez Magsanoc
- Founded: 1983
- Political alignment: Center-left
- Language: English
- Country: Philippines

Mr. & Ms. Special Edition was a weekly opposition tabloid magazine published from 1983 to 1986 that played a pivotal role in bringing about the downfall of the regime of Philippine President Ferdinand Marcos.

== Background ==
Mr. & Ms. Special Edition was created by publisher Eugenia Apostol in response to the murder of opposition leader Benigno "Ninoy" Aquino upon his return from exile in the United States. National dailies were so intimidated by Marcos that coverage of the murder and Aquino's funeral, attended by two million Filipinos, was negligible. Apostol, angered by the non-coverage, printed a newsprint edition of Mr. & Ms. the glossy variety magazine she published which reproduced reportage and comment from the international press.

To edit Mr. & Ms. Special Edition, Apostol recruited her friend Letty Jimenez Magsanoc, who was the editor of a Sunday magazine until she was sacked for writing an article which was perceived to be critical of Marcos.

The first issue had the bloodied face of Aquino's corpse on the cover. Magsanoc and Apostol recruited a team of staffwriters to provide features that gave an alternative view of the pro-Marcos coverage of the daily newspapers. The Special Edition sold 750,000 copies on its first outing and continued to maintain sales of between 300,000 and 400,000 weekly.

Focused on the Aquino assassination and its aftermath, the Special Edition carried detailed coverage of the government-created Fact-Finding Board's investigation of the murder. It also reported on other human rights abuses in the country.

The paper worked out of an abandoned space near the Mr. & Ms. offices, disguised with a sign on the door reading "LJM Garments Factory" (after the editor's initials). Working under threat, the editorial staff shuttled between Apostol's home, the editorial office, and other locations to escape surveillance and arrest.

A biography of Apostol describes the impact of the Special Edition: "There were other publications that covered the Aquino assassination and its aftermath, like WHO, Business Day, and Malaya. These papers helped enlarge the sphere of public information and stoke the spirit of democratic dissent. The Mr. & Ms. Special Edition, however, was the most effective in reaching a broad readership because of its bold, almost tabloidish, design (with its heavy use of photographs and cartoons), aggressive reportage, and energetic writing. It was unique in the manner in which it gave free play to the burgeoning culture of popular resistance with its in-your-face reportage (its maiden issue featured a blow-up of Aquino's bloodied face), cartoons, and feature articles on phenomena like the epidemic of gallows humor and political jokes that came in the wake of the assassination."

The tabloid played a leading role in opposing the Marcos regime. Its front cover sported a graphic that counted the number of days since the unsolved murder of Aquino. When the 25 soldiers present at Aquino's murder were put on trial, Apostol launched a weekly newspaper, the Philippine Inquirer, devoted to coverage of the trial. In 1985, the Inquirer eventually metamorphosed as Philippine Daily Inquirer, which is the leading daily in the Philippines for many years.

After the People Power Revolution brought down the Marcos regime in February 1986, Apostol, declaring that the Special Edition had achieved what it set out to do, quietly replaced the Mr. & Ms. Special Edition with the Agribusiness Weekly.
