= Maria Ceres Doyo =

Filipino journalist and activist

Maria Ceres P. Doyo is a Filipino journalist, author, human rights activist, and feminist best known as a columnist and staff writer for the Philippine Daily Inquirer, for her numerous books on Philippine journalism, and for the historical impact of her investigative reports during the martial law under Ferdinand Marcos.

== Martial law and journalism career beginnings ==
Doyo had been a human rights activist before she became a journalist, but decided to cover the murder of Butbut Kalinga pangat (leader) Macli-ing Dulag after his leadership of the opposition to the Chico River Dam Project. The publication of the work in the Manila Bulletin's Panorama magazine led to the firing of its then-editor Letty Jimenez Magsanoc and to Doyo herself being investigated by Marcos' armed forces. The incident proved to be a watershed moment in the mainstream press' coverage of Martial Law, with the media finally being able to publish reports critical of Marcos' authoritarian rule. The coverage earned Doyo her first major journalistic award, the Catholic Mass Media Awards trophy, given to her by Pope John Paul II during his visit to the Philippines in 1981.

== Journalistic career ==
Beginning with the Chico River Dam Project story, Doyo's career as journalist has spanned four decades. She has written special reports and features, and she writes a popular regular column titled "Human Face" published in the Philippine Daily Inquirer.

== Books ==
- Journalist in Her Country : Articles, Essays & Photographs, 1980-1992
- Press Freedom under Siege : Reportage that Challenged the Marcos Dictatorship
- Macli-ing Dulag : Kalinga Chief, Defender of the Cordillera
- You Can't Interview God : Church Women and Men in the News : Selected Columns from the Philippine Daily Inquirer
- Bituin and the Big Flood
- Human Face : A Journalist's Encounters and Awakenings
- The Sisters Have Come a Long Way : A Look at the Lives of Women Religious in the Philippines

== Awards ==
Among the awards Doyo have won over the years include the Catholic Mass Media Award, the National Book Award, and the Jaime V. Ongpin Award.

== See also ==
- Letty Jimenez Magsanoc
- Macli-ing Dulag
- Chico River Dam Project
