= Edicio dela Torre =

Filipino activist

Edicio "Ed" G. dela Torre (b. July 11, 1943) is a Filipino activist, educator, and laicized priest, and former political detainee best known for his part in the resistance to the Marcos dictatorship, for being a key mover of the Philippines' Popular Democracy movement in its formative years, and for the various roles he played in the Philippine Rural Reconstruction Movement (PRRM), Technical Education and Skills Development Authority (TESDA), the Bantayog ng mga Bayani, the Second Congressional Commission on Education (EDCOM 2)) and co-convenor of the Atin Ito Coalition which supports civilian-led supply and solidarity missions to Philippine ships stationed in the West Philippine Sea.

Dela Torre was ordained in as a priest in the Societas Verbi Divini (SVD) in December, 1968, but immediately found himself surrounded by a nation in crisis. Strongly influenced by the writings of Paolo Freire,he became a prominent voice in contextualizing the Latin American liberation theology approach into the Philippine setting, which came to be known as the "theology of struggle." He co-founded the underground mass organization Christians for National Liberation, and was eventually detained twice by the Marcos regime, spending about nine years as a political detainee in total.

When the Marcoses were ousted by the People Power Revolution in 1986, dela Torre was one of the prominent voices from the resistance movement who saw a need to find a "third path" between elite-dominated electoral politics vis a vis constant armed struggle. This became the Popular Democracy movement, whose "bibingka" (rice cake) strategy focused on centered on expanding democratic space by pursuing democratization and development “from below” and “from above” just as the Filipino traditional ricecake is cooked from both directions. This period also saw dela Torre request for laicization - a formal dispensation from the obligations of the priesthood, which was granted in 1987.

The following years saw the movement transition from a political faction into a sort of institutional backbone for Philippine non-government organizations and electoral coalitions, and dela Torre became an important architect for the institutionalization of participatory governance. He co-founded the Institute for Popular Democracy immediately after the People Power Revolution in 1986, and the Education for Life Foundation (ELF) in 1992. He then accepted a post as director-general of the Technical Education and Skills Development Authority (TESDA) from 1998 until 2001 – a post which allowed him to institutionalize PopDem values within the organization. He later accepted a term president of the Philippine Rural Reconstruction Movement (PRRM). He was also named an Eminent Fellow of the Development Academy of the Philippines (DAP).

== See also ==
- Isagani Serrano
- Horacio Morales
- Susan Quimpo
- Etta Rosales
