= Letty Jimenez Magsanoc =

Filipina journalist and editor

Letty Jimenez-Magsanoc
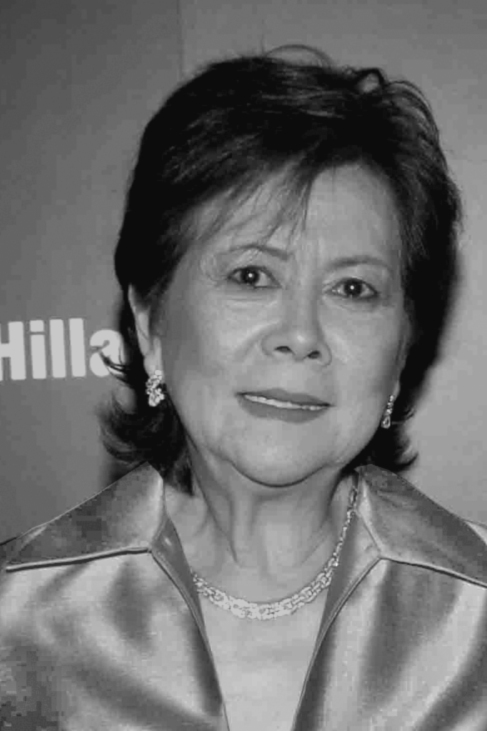
- Born: Leticia Jimenez; September 13, 1941; Manila, Philippines
- Died: December 24, 2015 (aged 74); Quezon City, Metro Manila
- Other name: LJM
- Occupations: Journalist, Editor
- Spouse: Carlos Magsanoc
- Children: 3, including Kara Magsanoc-Alikpala
- Relatives: Inday Badiday (sister)

Letty Jimenez-Magsanoc (September 13, 1941 – December 24, 2015) was a Filipino journalist and editor, notable for her role in overthrowing the dictatorship of Ferdinand Marcos. She was an icon of democracy. Magsanoc was editor of the crusading weekly opposition tabloid Mr & Ms Special Edition. In late 1985, she co-founded the Philippine Daily Inquirer, for which she provided the name and served as editor-in-chief.

Magsanoc is among three journalists whose names were added to the Bantayog ng mga Bayani (Monument of Heroes) Wall of Remembrance in 2016. Bantayog ng mga Bayani cited her for "speaking truth to power without fear." Magasanoc was recognized "for testing the limits of press freedom as writer and editor, for defying media restrictions and censorship under martial rule and for facing up to the wrath of the dictatorship."

The Senate of the Philippines, in a resolution filed shortly after her death, recognized Magsanoc for her contribution to the restoration of freedom in the Philippines.

== Personal life ==
Jimenez-Magsanoc was the eldest of nine children of Colonel Nicanor Jimenez, a former Philippine National Railways (PNR) manager and director of the NISA, the government intelligence agency, later Philippine ambassador to Korea. She and her husband Carlitos Magsanoc had three children, including Kara Magsanoc-Alikpala.

Magsanoc described herself as "newspaper-struck" from an early age, contributing features to the (Philippine) Sunday Times Magazine while a senior at St. Teresa's College, Manila, encouraged by Times women's editor Eugenia Apostol. She spent most of the 1960s in the United States, taking a masters in journalism at the University of Missouri. In 1963, she married Carlos Magsanoc, a doctor. Her daughter Kara Magsanoc-Alikpala is a broadcast journalist who produces news documentaries. Jimenez-Magsanoc died on the night of Christmas Eve, December 24, 2015, at St. Luke's Medical Center in Taguig, after suffering from cardiac arrest.

== Early career ==
The Magsanoc family returned to the Philippines in 1969. Magsanoc joined the Manila Bulletin. When the women's section editor of the Bulletin's Sunday magazine, Panorama left, Magsanoc was asked to take the job. "The last place I wanted to land in, in any publication was the women's pages, which I consider a journalism ghetto. I was trying to get away from writing about lipstick and fashion. fortunately I was allowed to write about almost anything. Sometimes it had nothing to do with women.".

In 1976, Magsanoc began to write for the daily Manila Bulletin, after a co-editorship with a male colleague did not work. She wrote a thrice weekly column, The Passing Scene, alternating with columnist Tony Nieva. Later, she was given her own column Not for People Only. This was when she began to get into trouble with authorities for being critical of the post-martial law Marcos government.

In 1978, General Hans Menzi, publisher of the Manila Bulletin, asked Magsanoc to take over the editorship of Panorama. Magsanoc was reluctant. "I did not want to be editor because I just wanted to do writing. You know what it's like to be editor, you have to sit at the desk, give out assignments, and clean up everybody's copy. It is difficult to conceptualize the whole issue. What I wanted to do was go out and write." She demanded that Panorama be given a 60 per cent editorial to 40 per cent advertising ratio and to her surprise, Menzie agreed. Magsanoc's arrival at Panorama gave the magazine a new reputation. Circulation soared with Magsanoc's editorship. Panorama staffer Margot Baterina said: "We pursued stories that nobody else dared to touch." National Press Club data of the time put the magazine's circulation at 300,000 on Sundays more than triple the combined circulation of the two other morning dailes.

== Panorama ==
Between 1976 and 1981, Letty Jimenez Magsanoc was editor of Panorama, the Philippines' largest circulating magazine of the time. Five months after being named one of the 1981 Ten Outstanding Women of the New Society she was forced to resign after writing an article perceived as critical to the government.

A Time magazine article which hailed Magsanoc as an Asian hero described the circumstances that forced her departure from Panorama: "Magsanoc had written a tongue-in-cheek story on Marcos' third inauguration as President. Marcos had sought to fend off criticism of his rule by staging a faux election. His "victory" was celebrated in a sumptuous, if surreal, ceremony, in which a choir sang Handel's Messiah. Magsanoc led off with a line from Handel: "And he shall reign forever and ever." Marcos thought that blasphemous and got her fired."

Magsanoc's forced resignation sparked a media furore, with journalists using their columns to speak out, though several pieces were suppressed by publishers. Several articles rejected by other magazines were published by Eugenia Apostol's women's magazine, Mr & Ms.

Magsanoc's article was a piece about the inauguration, illustrated with candid photographs and captions, under the title There Goes the New Society; Welcome the New Republic

=== Events following Magsanoc's forced resignation ===
The forced resignation of Letty Jimenez Magsanoc was the first of a series of events that led to criticism of the Marcos government for suppressing press freedom. The events were:

- Letty Jimenez Magsanoc forced to resign after writing an article perceived to be critical of the Marcoses.
- The arrest and filing of subversion charges against We Forum publisher/editor Jose Burgos, Jr. and his staff
- Libel case against Panorama editor Domini T. Suarez and writer Ceres P. Doyo
- Military interrogation of Bulletin columnists Arlene Babst and Ninez Cacho Olivares; Mr & Ms editor publisher Eugenia Apostol and managing editor Doris G. Nuyda; and writers Lorna Kalaw-Tirol and Jo-Ann Maglipon
- Resignation of Tempo editor Recah Trinidad.

=== Banned articles ===
- The Lady at Maynila

Sundays column, Panorama, October 12, 1980. Several thousand copies of the issue were distributed in Metro Manila and the provinces with the page missing. Another edition of the issue carried Letters to the Editor in place of the article.

- Survival: Variations on the Human Condition

Sundays column, Panorama, July 19, 1981. Ordered pulled out by publisher Hans Menzi because of tongue-in-cheek remarks about the national economic situation

== Mr & Ms Special Edition ==
Letty Jimenez Magsanoc was editor of Mr & Ms Special Edition from 1983 to 1986.

Magsanoc was invited to become editor of Mr & Ms Special Edition by publisher Eugenia Apostol in the aftermath of the assassination of opposition leader Benigno Aquino Jr.

Apostol, in her acceptance speech at the 2006 Magsaysay Award for Journalism, Literature and Creative Communication Arts, said: "The Filipinos were outraged and more than two million of them joined (Aquino's) funeral procession. But the Marcos media hardly took note of the event. That was when I decided to do a 16-page special issue on Ninoy Aquino's funeral, using the resources of a woman's magazine called Mr. & Ms. which I was then editing ... The response to the funeral issue was unbelievable. The agents kept coming back for more, and so we had to print 500 thousand copies. After that, I had to ask Letty Jimenez-Magsanoc to help me edit a weekly Mr. & Ms. Special Edition just to feed the hunger of the readers for more about Ninoy and a growing anger towards martial law and Ferdinand Marcos. Every week we felt called upon to record the various demonstrations of civilians against Marcos, and when no reprisal came (except for an invitation to an interrogation at Fort Bonifacio in January 1983), we went on for three years ..."

== Sunday Inquirer Magazine ==
Magsanoc was the first editor-in-chief of the Sunday Inquirer Magazine from 1986 to 1987.

== Philippine Daily Inquirer ==
Magsanoc was the editor-in-chief of the Philippine Daily Inquirer since 1991 until her death in 2015. She was the first woman and the longest-serving (to date) editor-in-chief of the country's leading newspaper. Almost a month after she died Magsanoc was named as the Filipino of the Year for 2015 by the newspaper she worked at for three decades.

== Awards ==
- 1981: Outstanding Women in the Nation's Service. (Ten Outstanding Women of the New Society.)
- 1993: Honor Medal for Distinguished Service in Journalism, University of Missouri.
- 2006: Time International "60 Years of Asian Heroes".
- 2013: Ninoy Aquino Medal of Valor
- 2015: Journalist of the Year, 19th Rotary Club of Manila Journalism Awards.

== See also ==
- Bantayog ng mga Bayani
