= Philippine New Wave =

Movement in Philippine cinema

- Years active: 2000s - present
- Location: Philippines
- Major figures: Raymond Red, Lav Diaz, Brillante Mendoza, Avid Liongoren, Carl Joseph Papa, Cathy Garcia-Sampana
- Influences: Arthouse film; Comedy-drama; Dogme 95; French New Wave; Independent film; Melodrama; No wave cinema; Slow cinema; Philippine animation; Southeast Asian cinema

Philippine New Wave (known as Filipino New Wave or Contemporary Philippine Cinema) is a movement in Philippine cinema that has been popularly associated with the resurgence of independent, mainstream, and experimental films in the Philippines began in the 21st century, merge into a recent filmmaking period known as the Third Golden Age of Philippine cinema.

Formulaic romantic comedies and family melodrama films constituted the majority of mainstream releases to boost major box-office success, which independent filmmakers spurred a renewed interest for international co-production films through film festivals.

== Origins ==
Following the first golden age (in the 1950s to 1960s) and the second (from the 1970s to the early 1980s), there was a dramatic decline of the Philippine mainstream film industry in the mid-1980s to 1990s. Hollywood films dominated theater sales even more, and fewer than twenty local studio films were being produced and shown yearly. Many producers and production houses later stopped producing films after losing millions of pesos.

Thereafter, a new sense of excitement and trend enveloped the industry with the coming of digital and experimental cinema. Following the winning of the Short Palme d'Or at the Cannes Film Festival 2000 of Raymond Red's short film Anino (Shadows), the 1999 digital feature film Still Lives by Jon Red pioneered this digital revolution; many other digital filmmakers soon followed suit. Cheaper production cost using digital media over film has helped the rebirth of independent filmmaking. Hailed as the inspiration to French New Wave in digital form, this decade saw the proliferation of digital films by independent filmmakers with international reach and caliber, and the introduction of locally produced animated features.

== History ==
It was in 1999 that digital cinema was introduced in the Philippines but by then, the film industry was already dwindling in numbers. According to the records of the UP Film Institute, 122 films were produced in the year 1999 and 83 in 2000. In 2002, the number went even lower with having only 92 films then further went down to 80 in 2003. This decline in film production was attributed to the country's economic movement wherein the Philippine Film industry was considered one of the heavily taxed industries in terms of equipment, materials and film stock and the imposition of a 30 percent amusement tax to be paid to the local government and a 12 percent value added tax to the central government. Consequently, the high production costs brought about by the high taxes caused ticket admission to also go up. Thus leading to people opting for a different and cheaper form of entertainment particularly in television.

Signs of rebirth of the Philippine cinema arose by way of movies with inspirational themes. In 2002, Gil Portes released Mga Munting Tinig (Small Voices), a subdued movie about a teacher who inspired her students to follow their dreams; the movie also implied improving the country's education system. A year later, Mark Meily's comedy Crying Ladies, about three Filipinas working as professional mourners in Manila's Chinatown but looking for other ways to earn a living, became a huge hit. Also that same year, Maryo J. de los Reyes made a buzz at various film festivals with Magnifico, a simple film with universal appeal about a boy trying to help his family survive their hardships.

In 2005, the film industry saw the lowest number of films produced with only 50 films that were commercially released. However, the establishment of film festivals Cinemalaya and Cinema One Originals which are dedicated to digital films, the addition of Digital Lokal, a digital section, at the Cinemanila International Film Festival, and the second offering of the ..MOV International Digital Film Festival helped save the Philippine Film industry.

In 2006 and 2007, Filipino filmmakers started making movies using digital media. Duda (Doubt) is an example of how a man driven by an idea for a film, against all odds, can succeed in creating a significant statement. Writer/Director Crisaldo Pablo used a cast of friends and some professional actors, and with the use of a Sony VX-1, a Hi-8 camcorder, made the first full-length digital movie ever shot in the Philippines. Comments by Cris Pablo and casts in the 'making of' featurette on the DVD demonstrated how much dedication to vision played in this movie. Donsol, by director Adolfo Alix, made waves with his debut digital movie about Donsol, a fishing town and in the opposite, a sanctuary to endangered whale sharks. Other filmmakers of note include Jeffrey Jeturian and Auraeus Solito.

In 2008, the Philippine movie industry took centerstage at the 6th Edition of the Festival Paris Cinema 2008 in France. About forty Filipino films were shown at the film festival, with Star Cinema's Caregiver (starring Sharon Cuneta) and Ploning (Judy Ann Santos) as opening films. Filipino actor Piolo Pascual was invited by Paris Mayor Delanoe and actress Charlotte Rampling to grace the occasion.

Although Filipino digital films are made in almost no time and with meager budget, they are strongly represented in international film festivals. Numerous works of a new breed of filmmakers had their films seen at the prestigious film festivals around the world like in Berlin, Cannes, Venice, Vienna and Rotterdam. with several winning prizes and awards. Among the works included are Ang Pagdadalaga ni Maximo Oliveros (2005) by Auraeus Solito, Kubrador (2006) by Jeffrey Jeturian, Todo Todo Teros (2006) by John Torres, Endo (2007) by Jade Castro, Tribu (2007) by Jim Libiran.

In 2007, a Filipino short film entitled Napapanggap (Pretend) by Debbie Formoso, a recent graduate of MFA Master of Film Art at LMU Loyola Marymount University in Los Angeles, had a successful run in a number of US film festivals. Several other short films, including Pedro "Joaquin" Valdes's Bulong (Whisper), as well as documentaries, garnered international attention and honors.

In order to build up and stimulate the film industry, some Congressmen and Senators recently have authored a number of proposals and legislations pending ratification by the Philippine Congress. Many of the bills seek to ease the multiple taxes on producers, theater operators and patrons. One of the bills, for instance, proposes to exempt from the 30-percent amusement tax on all locally produced movies classified by regulators as for "general patronage" or "parental guidance-13". Another bill seeks to exempt local producers from the 12-percent value-added tax (VAT) on imported filmmaking raw materials and equipment.

In 2010, an eponymous documentary film, Philippine New Wave: This Is Not a Film Movement, about the most prominent internationally-acclaimed and wildly divergent digital filmmakers from the Philippines answer questions on filmmaking and beyond.

== Notable filmmakers and actors ==
=== Lav Diaz ===
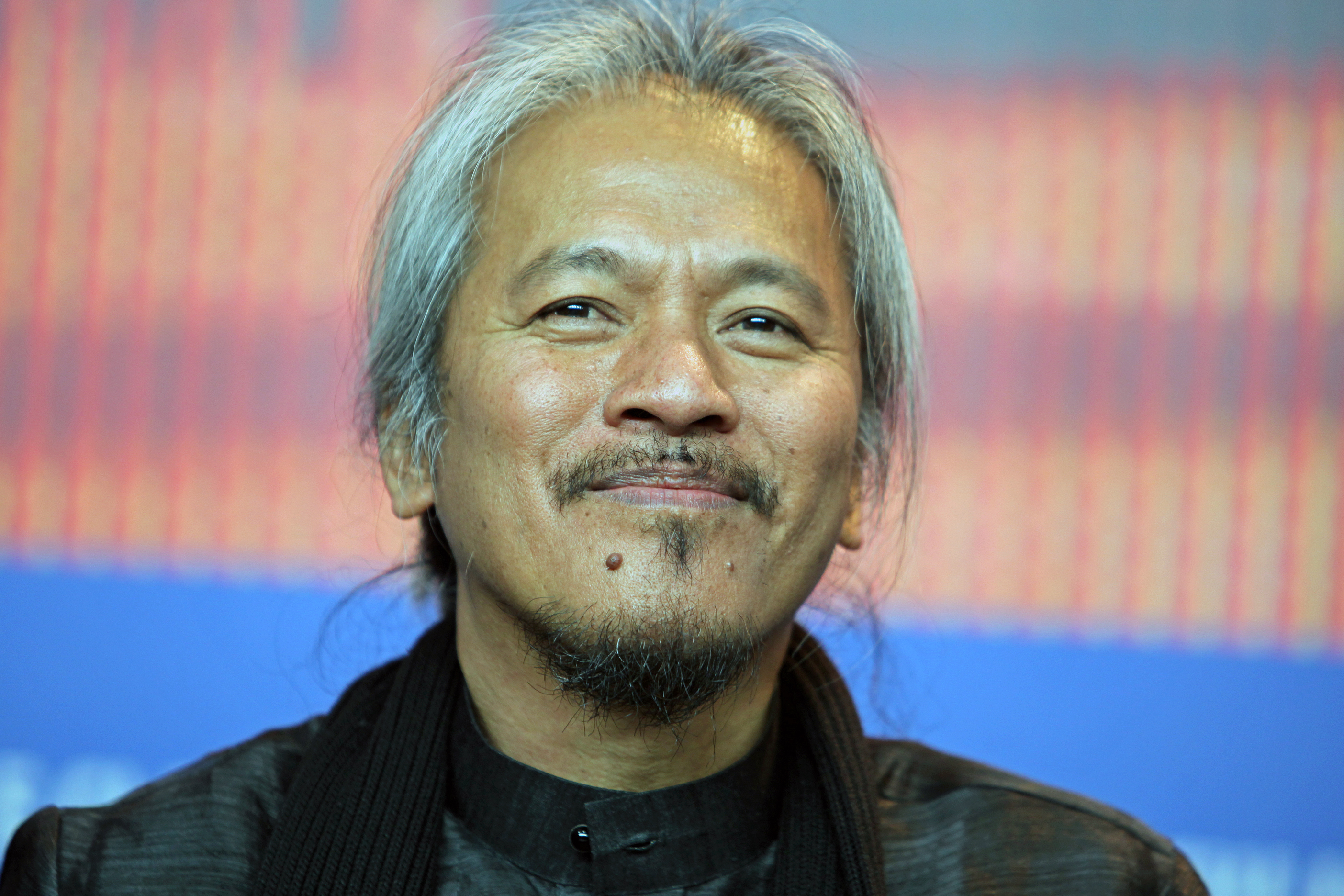
Diaz (pictured in 2016), director of The Woman Who Left, won the Golden Lion at the Venice Film Festival.

Lav Diaz is a Filipino independent filmmaker and former film critic who have known as a leading figure in experimental Philippine films and is one of the most critically acclaimed contemporary Filipino filmmakers whose works include long epics about Filipino life, some of which run up to ten hours including the 2004 film Ebolusyon ng Isang Pamilyang Pilipino, often testing the endurance of viewers.

In 2014, Diaz directed his 12th narrative feature, Mula sa Kung Ano ang Noon (literally "From What is Before") won the Golden Leopard at the 2014 Locarno Film Festival. Its win was a highly regarded as the second Filipino film to be awarded at an international film festival in the world almost twenty years after Lamangan's The Flor Contemplacion Story won the Golden Pyramid at the 1995 Cairo International Film Festival.

In 2016, Diaz directed his 16th narrative feature, Hele sa Hiwagang Hapis, received mixed reviews and was selected to compete for the Golden Bear at the 66th Berlin International Film Festival, won the Alfred Bauer Prize.

At the same year, Diaz directed his 17th narrative feature, Ang Babaeng Humayo (literally "The Woman Who Left"), received the Golden Lion at the 73rd Venice International Film Festival, the first Philippine film to do so, although it could be eligible to be submitted as a Philippine entry for the Best Foreign Language Film award at the 89th Academy Awards before it ended up selected to Mendoza's competitive film Ma' Rosa.

In 2017, Diaz became one of the few Filipinos who have invited by the Academy of Motion Picture Arts and Sciences to join as a member.

=== Dolly de Leon ===
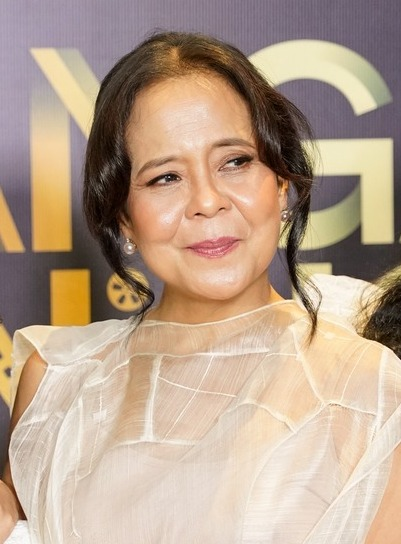
De Leon at the Film Development Council of the Philippines' Honor of Arts in 2023

Dolly Earnshaw de Leon is a Filipino actress known primarily for her work in independent films and theater, starting in a horror anthology film Shake, Rattle & Roll III (1991) and was cast in small and uncredited roles throughout the 1990s and 2000s.

In 2022, De Leon achieved international recognition and acclaim for starring as a toilet cleaner on a luxury yacht in Ruben Östlund's satirical black comedy Triangle of Sadness (2022), winning the Guldbagge Award and Los Angeles Film Critics Association Award for Best Supporting Performance. She received nominations for a Golden Globe Award and for a BAFTA Award for Best Supporting Actress, becoming the first Filipino to be nominated for the awards in any category.

Due to her being internationally recognized by filmmakers and celebrities, De Leon continues to starred in the adult animated drama The Missing (2023), and the comedies Between the Temples and Grand Death Lotto (both in 2024).

In 2023, Leon became one of the few Filipinos who have invited by the Academy of Motion Picture Arts and Sciences to join as a member.

=== Brillante Mendoza ===
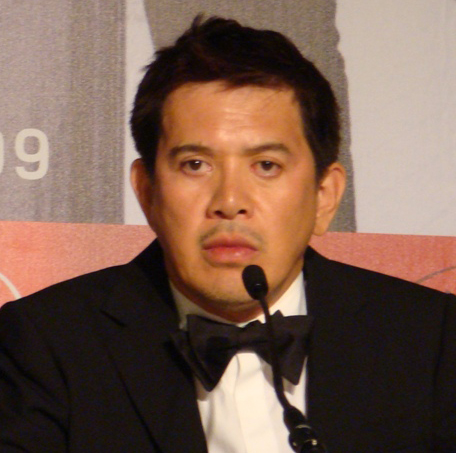
Mendoza, director of Kinatay, won the Best Director award at the 2009 Cannes Film Festival.

Brillante Mendoza is a Filipino filmmaker who is one of the key members associated with the Filipino New Wave, among his works garnered more than 50 awards and 75 nominations at national award ceremonies and international film festivals. He began to work as a filmmaker in 2005 before the dissolution of Danish's controversial movement Dogme 95, which he used some concept from the movement for his first film, The Masseur, serves as an inspiration. He has directed sixteen films since 2005, also he credited some of his films as cinematographer and production designer under his alias "Dante". His first frequent collaboration with actor Coco Martin in seven films including Masahista, Summer Heat, Foster Child, Tirador, Serbis, Kinatay, and Captive.

In 2008, Serbis (literally Service) became the first Filipino full-length film to compete for Palme d'Or at the Cannes Film Festival since internationally acclaimed director Lino Brocka's Bayan Ko: Kapit sa Patalim (literally "This is My Country") in 1984.

In 2009, Kinatay (literally "Butchered" or "The Execution of P"), about murder and police brutality, brought the highest international esteem to a Filipino filmmaker when Brillante Mendoza was judged as the Best Director at the 62nd Cannes Film Festival, the first Filipino filmmaker to receive the honor. The film was notorious for being critically panned by Roger Ebert, an American famous film critic, who declared it the worst film ever to be shown at the Cannes Film Festival since Gallo's The Brown Bunny. His win was heralded by President Arroyo and his countrymen.

In 2017, Mendoza became one of the few Filipinos who have invited by the Academy of Motion Picture Arts and Sciences to join as a member.

In 2019, he directed a titular film, Mindanao, a war drama about a Muslim mother cares for her cancer-stricken daughter while she awaits her husband to come home who serves as a combat medic deployed in the southern Philippines. The film receives critical acclaim from local reviews and won multiple awards at national award ceremonies including 45th Metro Manila Film Festival, 22nd Gawad Pasado, 38th FAP Luna Awards, and 14th Gawad Genio Awards, all of which categories are Best Film and Best Director.

=== Isabel Sandoval ===
Isabel Sandoval is a Filipina filmmaker who has been associated with the next wave of Philippine independent cinema of the 2020s. Sandoval is also the first trans woman of color to compete at the Venice Film Festival for her international debut film, Lingua Franca. She is also known for her films Señorita and Aparisyon. She is currently working on her next feature Tropical Gothic, based on the 1972 short story by Nick Joaquin.

In 2022, Sandoval became the first Asian trans woman who have invited by the Academy of Motion Picture Arts and Sciences to join as a member.

=== Carl Joseph Papa ===
Carl Joseph Echague Papa is a Filipino filmmaker and animator who has been associated with the adult animation of the Philippines during the 21st century. He is known for rotoscoping adult animated films deal with mature subject matters and themes of family issues, including Manang Biring (2015) and Iti Mapukpukaw (2023).

His films have been screened at film festivals worldwide and received multiple awards.

== Other known filmmakers ==
- Sherad Anthony Sanchez
- Kanakan Balintagos
- Joyce Bernal
- Ditsi Carolino
- Jade Castro
- Pepe Diokno
- Jeffrey Jeturian
- Khavn
- Raya Martin
- Erik Matti
- Cathy Garcia-Sampana
- Mikhail Red
- Roxlee
- Kidlat Tahimik
- Jerrold Tarog
- Paolo Villaluna

== Notable films ==
- Ebolusyon ng Isang Pamilyang Pilipino (2004)
- Serbis (2008)
- Urduja (2008)
- Independencia (2009)
- Kinatay (2009)
- RPG Metanoia (2010)
- Ang Babae sa Septic Tank (2011)
- Thy Womb (2012)
- Manang Biring (2015)
- Ang Babaeng Humayo (2016)
- Birdshot (2016)
- Die Beautiful (2016)
- Ma' Rosa (2016)
- Saving Sally (2016)
- Bliss (2017)
- Paglisan (2018)
- Cleaners (2019)
- Hello, Love, Goodbye (2019)
- Hayop Ka! (2020)
- Magellan (2025)
- Filipiñana (2026)

== See also ==
- Cinema of the Philippines
