= Adult animation in the Philippines =

An excerpt image from the 1978 film Tadhana, the first true Philippine animated feature film. The scene where the main characters Kulafu and Boyet find out Datu Tausi died in the battlefield.

In the Philippines, adult animation was established as an early turning point in Philippine animation and became a primary factor for experimental and satirical purposes, traced back during the martial law period under President Ferdinand Marcos. Philippine adult animation was pioneered by Nonoy Marcelo's Tadhana (1978), analyzed as a historical satire infused with musical numbers, anti-imperialist and progressive themes.

Philippine adult animation marks a surge after the release of Tadhana, which animators and filmmakers allow to produce their own experimental animated short films until the People Power Revolution in 1986. Each of these short films adopt the exploration of social conflicts, while adding sensitive topics in some occasions. Nonoy Dadivas and Fruto Corre's The Criminal and Roxlee's The Great Smoke (1984) are exemplars. After the regime, animators continue to produce animated works more age-appropriate as children's entertainment as well as outsourced international works, leaving the adult-oriented format plummet for years. Several short films were being made in the period.

However, in the 2010s, feature films saw its resurgence, although slowly producing, after the releases of Carl Joseph Papa's Manang Biring (2015) and Paglisan (2018) both released on Cinema One Original Film Festival. They also gained international attention for the releases of Avid Liongoren's Hayop Ka! (2020, Netflix), the first to be distributed exclusively on streaming services and to be selected at the Annecy International Animated Film Festival, and Papa's The Missing (2023), making it the first to be submitted by the Philippines for the Academy Award for Best International Feature Film. Filipino-produced or Filipino-centric television series, such as Barangay 143 and Trese, represent a growing trend that blend Philippine culture with anime-esque and mature themes.

The Philippines helped the animation shift as an alternative format beyond riveting premise with evolving cultural norms to explore daily conflicts, themes, and topics aimed at young adult and mature audiences.

== Martial law under Ferdinand Marcos ==
An excerpt title of the film from Huling Ptyk: Da Art of Nonoy Marcelo.

After the establishment of martial law under Marcos's presidency in 1972, Philippine animation became a tool for propaganda but adult animation was not introduced until 1978, cartoonist Nonoy Marcelo produced an animated historical satire, Tadhana, intended to be the first fully animated feature produced in the Philippines. Based on a book allegedly authored by President Ferdinand Marcos, it was initially interpreted as a presidential propaganda of New Society Movement; Marcelo incorporates a satirical, humorous and poignant view with anti-imperialist and progressive themes of the Philippines's history under Spanish colonization.

Despite being released as a television premiere in commemoration of the sixth anniversary of martial law, it is one of the many films in the Philippines released under regime and martial law during the Marcos era which lasted until the 1986 revolution. It was then rereleased for artistic and educational purposes.

During that era, adult animation saw a surge after the television premiere of Tadhana, animators and filmmakers began to produce their own animated short films with similar use of satirical, political and mature themes. An independent animator Roxlee is one of exemplars, utilized sensitive topics that were previously suppressed by the regime using his short films with unusual animation techniques.

== Post-martial law ==
=== 2010s ===
External videos
- Lakas ng Lahi (Blood Compact) hosted on Arnold Arre's official YouTube channel

In the 2010s, Sanayan Lang Ang Pagpatay (lit. 'Killing Just Becomes a Habit'), a 3-minute mockumentary short film about the butiki crawling on different areas of the house but it turns out killing the butiki to more gruesome ways, reflecting the murder and massacre spread by the news. Lakas ng Lahi (lit. 'Blood Compact'), a 9-minute action drama short film about these three Filipino warriors from the Spanish colonial era who find themselves in modern Philippines, still fighting oppression in new forms.

Barangay 143 (lit. 'District 143') is an anime-influenced television series, covers drama, family tensions, and game-fixing crime syndicates, follows a rising basketball star who returns to Manila in search of his father.

=== 2020s ===
Animated feature films are becoming popular in the streaming industry began in the COVID-19 pandemic, as such this Avid Liongoren's Hayop Ka! (2020), a romantic comedy satirized with teleserye tropes about an anthropomorphic feline, who works as a perfume saleswoman, finds herself in the middle of a love triangle. Hayop Ka! marks the first Philippine animated film to be distributed exclusively on streaming service Netflix.

Carl Joseph Papa's The Missing (2023), revolves an animator without a mouth who encounters and attempts to defeat an alien intent on abducting him after learning that his uncle is dead, was the first animated film submitted by the Philippines for the Academy Award for Best International Feature Film.

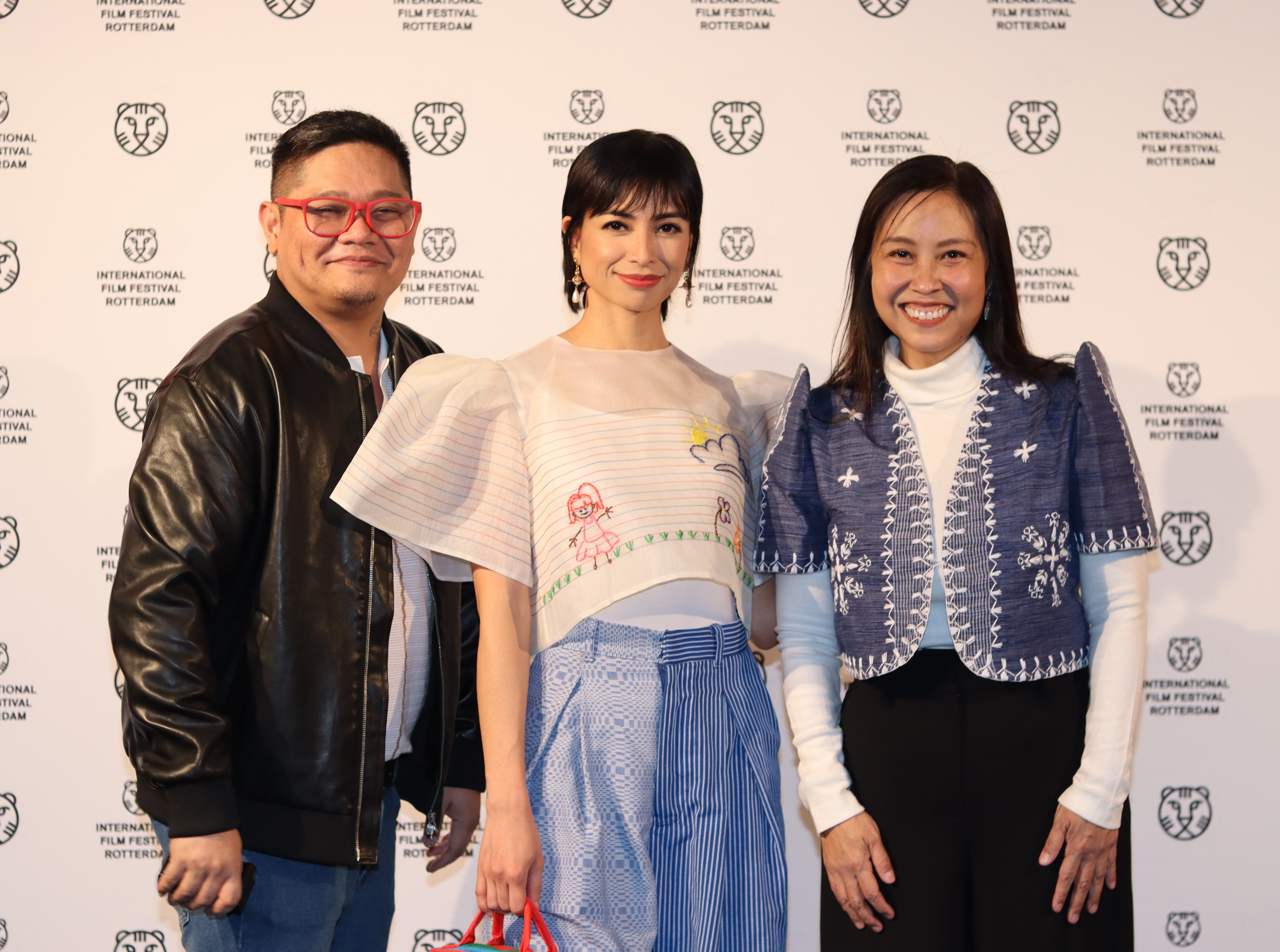
Carl Joseph Papa, Glaiza de Castro and Nessa Valdellon at the animated film 58th premiere during the IFFR 2026.

GMA Pictures announced their first foray to animated feature films, which both released in 2026: Carl Joseph Papa's docudrama 58th about the Maguindanao massacre, and Mervin Malonzo's Ella Arcangel: Awit ng Pangil at Kuko, based on a 2017 komik Ella Arcangel by Julius Villanueva. 58th was also GMA Pictures' first feature film ever to be selected at the International Film Festival Rotterdam as a part of Harbour program.

Another Liongoren film was the superhero romantic comedy film Zsazsa Zaturnnah (2026), based on a komik of the same name by Carlo Vergara.

The Lovers, an urban fantasy romantic thriller short film by Studio Heartbreak, follows Sara Lim Baylon, a reluctant seafood chef, develops a forbidden romantic relationship with a sirena.

== Themes and interpretations ==
One of the early examples of Philippine adult animation, The Criminal (1981), a short film depicts the titular character walking around in a house after escaped the prison from death sentence. This scene's use of guillotine indicates death.

It covers varieties of thematic elements, which presents the country's socio-political issues, values, mythology, and even folklore. The prominent use of themes in animation stress the importance of family, friendship, love, and faith, while others struggle with abuse, corruption, sexuality, social class, and war. Many elements that are relatable to Filipinos including addiction, cancer, child abuse, death, depression, dysfunctional families, homelessness, pollution, poverty, social issues, suicide, and teenage pregnancy.

Arnold Arre is one of notable examples with his short films, known for exploring themes of death, resistance, identity, and the timeless struggle for freedom, including Milkyway (2013), Lakas ng Lahi (2014), and Himbing (2016).

== See also ==
- Adult animation by country
