= List of Animahenasyon winners =

This is a lists of winners and finalists of Animahenasyon.

== Categories ==
Professional Division (2007–2015)	Student / Amateur Division (2007–2015)
1–5 minutes
6–20 minutes
21–40 minutes	—N/a
Feature-length	—N/a
Music Video
Reels (Title Sequences / OBB / Infomercials / TVCs / Demo)
Television series	—N/a
Major / Special Division
Grand Prize	Special Jury Prize
Audience Choice Award	Hero TV's Choice
Excellence in Regional	John Martin Award
Excellence in Technical	Excellence in Storytelling
Excellence in Production Design	Excellence in Animation
Best Non-Narrative	Best Children
Special Citation
Non-competitive awards
Animahenasyon Institutional Award
Lifetime Achievement Award
Outstanding Emerging Artist in Animation

== 2007–2009 ==
=== 2007 ===
Animahensyon 2007: 1st Philippine Animation Festival
Competitive
No.	Title	Director/s	Category
2	Inday Wanda	Nelson “Blog” Caliguia, Jr.	Grand Prize; Professional Division: 6–20 minutes
2	Doodle Of Doom	Nelson ‘Blog’ Caliguia, Jr.; Jason Francis C. Confesor	Grand Prize; Student Division: 1–5 minutes
1	My Pet	Anna Katrina G. Bigornia	Audience Choice Award
1	Kariton; (transl. "Wagon")	Markwell Uy Gallos	Excellence in Regional
1	Patik; (transl. "Tattoo")	Wesley Kent Rasines	Excellence in Regional
1	WWIII	RJ Mabilin	Professional Division: 1–5 minutes
1	Siopawman	Kinjo Estioko; Pete Jimenez	Professional Division: Reels
1	Ang Paglikha; (transl. "The Creation")	Teta Tulay	Student Division: 6–20 minutes
1	Pop	Valroman R. Francisco	Student Division: Music Video
1	Crayola	Chris Ivan Robert P. Ceres	Student Division: Reels
1	Power Mac G5	Juan Martin G. Victorio	Student Division: Reels
Non-competitive awards
Larry Alcala (posthumous)			Lifetime Achievement Award

=== 2008 ===
Animahensyon 2008: 2nd Philippine Animation Festival
Competitive
No.	Title	Director/s	Category
2	Love and Marriage	Kenny Lynn Tai	Grand Prize; Student Division: 6–20 minutes
2	Just-tiis League	Ivan Despi	Jury Prize Winner; Professional Division: Reels
2	Sa Gabos ng Panahon; (transl. "For All The Time")	Raul N. Mimay	Excellence in Regional; Professional Division: 6–20 minutes
1	Para sa Aking Anak na Natuton Gumapang; (transl. "For My Child Learning to Crawl")	Reginald Vinluan	Special Citation
1	I'm Special, Are You?	Mike Brum; Gabe Dela Cruz; Gorio Vicuna	Special Citation
1	Power Unleashed	Sid Maderazo	Special Citation
1	Fly Aswang	Mark Galvez	Special Citation
1	Rhose	Narwuz Paguidopon	Special Citation
1	Samtang Bilog ang Butan; (transl. "While the Butan is Round")	Jonathan P. Jurilla	Special Citation
1	Hermano	Rhodius N. Daduya	Special Citation
1	Kukoman	Ralph Crisostomo	Special Citation
1	Anomi	Renie Dimla	Special Citation
1	Luchi	Jonel Factor; Celine Yao	Special Citation
1	Katchatore	Ivan Despi	Professional Division: 1–5 minutes
1	We Give It Sometimes	Ivan Despi	Professional Division: Music Videos
1	Lupang Hinirang	Rjay B. Morada	Student Division: 1–5 minutes
1	Some Say	Ruark Vallen S. Tapel	Student Division: Music Video
1	Carrot	Chris Ivan Robert P. Ceres	Student Division: Reels
Non-competitive
Severino "Nonoy" Marcelo (posthumous)			Lifetime Achievement Award

=== 2009 ===
Animahensyon 2009: 3rd Philippine Animation Festival
Competitive
No.	Title	Director/s	Category
3	Mutya; (transl. "Jewel")	Nelson “Blog” Caliguia, Jr.	Grand Prize; Hero TV's Choice; Professional Division: 6–20 minutes
2	The Handbook	Jose Luis R. Buan	Audience Choice Award; Student Division: 6–20 minutes
1	Lukso; (transl. "Leap")	John Kristoffer R. Sta. Clara	Excellence in Regional
1	Robotica	Allan Ray Bumanglag	Special Citation
1	Edison and the Moths	Maria Cristina “Tinay” Sison	Professional Division: 1–5 minutes
1	Pasintabi; (transl. "Aside")	Jeff Capili	Professional Division: Reels
1	Clownies	Neil Paul Molina	Student Division: 1–5 minutes
1	Yugto; (transl. "Stage")	John Kristoffer R. Sta. Clara	Student Division: Music Video
1	Philips Light Bulb	Samuel Elias Kirk Bacsain	Student Division: Reels
Non-competitive
José Zabala-Santos (posthumous)			Lifetime Achievement Award
Ateneo de Naga University, Department of Digital Arts and Computer Animation			Animahenasyon Institutional Award

== 2010–2019 ==
=== 2010 ===
Animahensyon 2010: 4th Philippine Animation Festival
Competitive
No.	Title	Director/s	Category
2	When Alma Died	Richmond Wesley Ruiz Tan	Grand Prize; Student Division: 1–5 minutes
2	Mga Damgo; (transl. "Dreams")	Remton Zuasola	Hero TV's Choice; Professional Division: 6–20 minutes
1	Wasteland	Eleanor Ramos	Special Jury Prize
1	Sulundon; (transl. "Ideal")	Jerome Alcordo; Ionone Bangcas	Excellence in Regional
1	Smog	Jerome Alcordo	Professional Division: 1–5 minutes
1	Kapitan Torpe; (transl. "Captain Torpe")	Antonio Jose Cadiz	Professional Division: Feature-length
1	Pasintabi; (transl. "Aside")	Jeff Capili	Professional Division: Reels
1	The Mystery of the 24th	Julian Santiago	Student Division: 6–20 minutes
1	Upuan; (transl. "Chair")	Maureen Romero	Student Division: Music Video
1	Close-Up Toothpaste	Marcelo William Muñoz	Student Division: Reels
Non-competitive
Roxlee			Lifetime Achievement Award

=== 2011 ===
Animahensyon 2011: 5th Philippine Animation Festival
Competitive
No.	Title	Director/s	Category
2	Sanayan Lang ang Pagpatay	Gil Joseph A. Sanchez	Grand Prize; Student Division: 1–5 minutes
2	Sincillola	Jerome Alcordo; Ionone Bangcas	Audience Choice Award; Best Regional Entry
2	Pasintabi	Jeff Capili	Excellence in Storytelling; Professional Division: 6–20 minutes
1	Kaleh at Mbaki	Dennis Sebastian	Excellence in Technical
1	Hytek	Rodolfo Tinapay	Professional Division: 1–5 minutes
1	Roy Dadivas	Roy Albert G. Dadivas	Professional Division: Reels
1	Paano Hulihin ang Araw	Jane Mariel L. Almoneda	Student Division: 6–20 minutes
1	Dream	Mary Jane A. Dejumo	Student Division: Music Video
1	Save Animal Habitat Advocacy Ad	Anthony Lemuel C. Reorizo	Student Division: Reels
Non-competitive
Geirry Garccia (posthumous)			Lifetime Achievement Award
Jose Ramon Vicente del Prado			Outstanding Emerging Artist in Animation

=== 2012 ===
Animahensyon 2012: 6th Philippine Animation Festival
Competitive
No.	Title	Director/s	Category
3	Marianing	Niko Dela Peña Salazar	Grand Prize; Hero TV’s Choice; Student Division: 6–20 minutes
2	Shop ni Kuya	Ado V. Ortiz	Audience Choice Award; Special Jury Prize
2	Oli Impan	Omar P. Aguilar	Special Jury Prize; Best Regional Entry
1	Bulador de Casa	Victor Ian M. Covarrubias	Special Jury Prize
1	Software Sentinels: The Antivirus	Lucky F. Fandalian	Special Jury Prize
1	Reversion	Giancarlo Chan Ng	Excellence in Technical
1	Pasintabi	Jeff Capili	Excellence in Storytelling
1	Kaleh at Mbaki	Dennis Sebastian	Professional Division: 1–5 minutes
1	Stream Engine Studios	Benigno Caparas	Professional Division: Reels
1	Bakuna ni Tutoy	Alexis Somes	Student Division: 1–5 minutes
1	Ulan	Marc Ericson Hidalgo	Student Division: Music Video
1	Monskuara	Roberto J. Oquias, Jr.	Student Division: Reels
Non-competitive
Nelson “Blog” Caliguia Jr.			Outstanding Emerging Artist in Animation

=== 2013 ===
Animahensyon 2013: 7th Philippine Animation Festival
Competitive
No.	Title	Director/s	Category
2	Buhay Kubo	Ellen Ramos	Grand Prize; Professional Division: 6–20 minutes
2	Andong Agimat	Arnold Arre	Special Jury Prize; Professional Division: 1–5 minutes
2	The Ditch	John Paul Bonoan	Excellence in Technical; Student Division: 6–20 minutes
2	Baka Nasa Labas si Ramil	Roberto Oquias, Jr.	Hero TV’s Choice; Best Animated Short (Children)
1	Lego	Jose Vicente Atilano IV	Audience Choice Award
1	Milkyboy	Arnold Arre	Excellence in Storytelling
1	Sika Laeng Iti Biag	John Infante; Mark Manuel Montero	Excellence in Regional
1	Panunuluyan	Jan Vincent T. Dela Viña	Best Animated Musical
1	Splat	Vincent Benjamin D. Reyta	Best Animated Short (Fantastic Idea)
1	Lalong ni Kulakog	Omar P. Aguilar	Best Animated Short (Philippine Folktale)
1	Reduce, Reuse, Recycle	Joanna Marie Pacardo Agnas	Best Educational Production
1	Kaninong Anino?	Arnold Arre	Professional Division: Music Video
1	It's More Fun in the Philippines	John Francis Laurin Bozar	Professional Division: Reels
1	Isang Araw, May Halimaw	Antonio Jose Cadiz	Professional Division: Television Series
1	To the Sky	Erika Ariela Santos	Student Division: 1–5 minutes
1	DJ Bombay	Hygie Ochoa	Student Division: Music Video
1	Drop Dead Georgeous	Diwa Tiongson	Student Division: Reels

=== 2014 ===
Animahensyon 2014: 8th Philippine Animation Festival
Competitive
No.	Title	Director/s	Category
3	Lakas ng Lahi	Arnold Arre	Grand Prize; Excellence in Technical; Professional Division: 6–20 minutes
3	Bira'y Bira	Martin Luigi G. Bugante	Audience Choice Award; Excellence in Regional; Student Division: 1–5 minutes
2	Best Quest	Matt Barretto	Special Jury Prize; Professional Division: Television Series
2	Cherry	Dustin Uy	Hero TV's Choice; Professional Division: 1–5 minutes
1	Papel	Mariel Sayuno	John Martin Award
1	Lego	Jose Vicente Atilano IV	Audience Choice Award
1	Kung Ako Ba Siya	Rabboni James Matubang	Special Citation
1	Sophie and Michael: On/Off	Enrico Tolentino	Best Animated Short: Children
1	The Unusual Pet	Leonardo R. Calma, Jr.	Professional Division: Reels
1	#ThatSocialVirus.com	Bryan Bennet S. Paguio	Student Division: 6–20 minutes
1	Cupid's Serenade	Jessica Martinez	Student Division: Music Video
1	Hanes Barako	Jefrey R. Ramos	Student Division: Reels
Non-competitive
Johanssus Botor			Animahenasyon Poster Design
Omar Panuel Aguilar			Outstanding Emerging Artist in Animation

=== 2015 ===
Animahensyon 2015: 9th Philippine Animation Festival
Competitive
No.	Title	Director/s	Category
3	GEO	John Aurthur Mercader	Grand Prize; Excellence in Technical; Professional Division: 6–20 minutes
3	8	Johanna Kaye Boncodin	Excellence in Regional; Excellence in Storytelling; Student Division: 1–5 minutes
2	The Seed	Joven L. Maniaol	John Martin Award; Student Division: 6–20 minutes
2	3 AETA	Dennis E. Sebastian	Excellence in Design; Professional Division: Reels
1	Family in God's Hand	Alstaire Allison Sarthou	Audience's Choice
1	People	Vaughnbryner G. Tan	Excellence in Animation Skill
1	The Little One	Tito Romero	Best Animated Short: Children
1	Unfocused	Isaac Narvacan	Professional Division: 1–5 minutes
1	Next Quest	Matt Barretto	Professional Division: Television Series
1	Huling Sayaw	Edward S.E. Corpuz	Student Division: Music Video
1	Stop Killing Journalists!	Khim Francis B. Balete	Student Division: Reels

=== 2016 ===
Animahensyon 2016: 10th Philippine Animation Festival
No.	Title	Director/s	Awards
3	Strings	Rafael Daniel G. Evangelista V	Grand Prize; Best Production Design; Excellence in Storytelling
2	Passage of Life	Renz Vincemark Cruz; Hannah Daryl Gayapa	Audience Choice Award; Excellence in Regional
2	Hinagunoy sa Goryon	Karl Derick Sia	Hero TV's Choice Award; Best Student Animation
1	Building Too	Christine Joyce R. Silva	John Martin Award
1	Josephine	Avid Liongoren	Excellence in Technical
1	Anito	John Aurthur Mercader	Excellence in Animation Skill
1	Muning	Avid Liongoren	Best Animated Short: Children

=== Animahenasyon 2017 Finalists ===
Student Division
Title	Director/s	School	Awards
Bata Bawal D'yan	Clarita Cailan, Angela Crisostomo, Kurt Lorenzo, Lanz Manalo	iAcademy	
Lola Loleng	Jean Tagyamon	University of the Philippines Film Institute	
Maling Akala	Elvin Macanlaylay	University of the East – Caloocan	
Bente	Romelyn Timbrezao	University of Makati	
Holy Dung	Vaughnbryner Tan	De La Salle–College of Saint Benilde	Best in Technical (Student Entry)
Diskarte	Jose Crisostomo, Michelle Cervantes	De La Salle–College of Saint Benilde	Grand Winner (Student Entry)
Katungkulan	Fria Ellorenco	Ateneo de Naga University	
Himbing ng Hele	Ingrid Cabrido, Reynard Joson, Kurt Jun	iAcademy	
Pagkalipas ng Hating Gabi	Neil Fandino	Ateneo de Naga University	
Half Past Nine	Gehashi Ohashi	Asia Pacific College	The John Martin Award
The Greatest Weapon	James Ebengao	University of Makati	
2:55	Victorino Sarmiento, Mark Casuyon	University of Makati	Best Production Design; Audience Choice Award
Salace	Gerardo Alamario, Jr.	De La Salle–College of Saint Benilde	
Prutas	CJ Cura, Kaori Hayama, Denny Karitharan, Jay Pillerva	Southville International School and Colleges	
Ugoy	Jana Borja	Lyceum of the Philippines University – Manila	
Daisy	MC Marvin Daisog	University of Makati	Best Animation Made for Children
Sierra Madre	Jovanni Tinapay	University of San Carlos	Best Narrative Animation (Student Entry); Best Regional Entry

Professional Division
Title	Director/s	Studio	Awards
Death Match Kaleidoscope	Giancarlo Chan Ng		
Brighten Up	Jeremy Sanchez		
Simple Decisions	Aaron Formilleza		
Cine Tala	Nick Deocampo	Center for New Cinema	Special Jury Award; Best Production Design (Professional Entry)
Wroxer	Jerry Santiago		
Unos	John Arthur Mercader	Puppeteer Animation Studios, Inc.	Best in Technical (Professional Entry)
Ribbon	Murielle Gwynn Bagadion		
Playground Beyond	Paolo Joaquin	Go Motion	Grand Winner (Professional Entry)

=== Animahenasyon 2018 Finalists ===
Student Division
Title	Director/s	School	Awards
A Little Bravery	Johanna Rafaela N. Santiago, Jules Daren L. Bonifacio, Manuelito Ace Y. Awitan	iAcademy	
Anxiety Avenue	Piccolo Stefano G. Raymundo	iAcademy	
Area C	Jan McLloyd M. Sumagpang	University of Makati	Jury's Special Citation
Dare	Camille Balete	Nanyang Technological University (School of Art Design & Media) – Singapore	Best Non-Narrative Animation (Student Entry); The John Martin Award
I.F.	Ma. Aloyan T. Yabut	Kalayaan College	
Kapalit	Frenevel Chrissa Marie Romero	Top Peg Institute of Animation & Design	
No Time	Isaiah Francis Greg P. Santos	De La Salle–College of Saint Benilde (School of Design & Arts)	
Puno	Jennifer Lomerio, Junel B. Tabagan, Francis M. Ramos, Rochelle M. Ocbina	Bicol University – Polangui Campus	
Slice of Life	Marvinne Anne H. de Guzman	De La Salle–College of Saint Benilde (School of Design & Arts)	
Sober	Rhexee Jeen Balgua, Christian Daniel Fabia, Kevin Collin Ramis	University of Makati	Grand Winner (Student Entry); Best Storytelling (Student Entry); Best Production Design (Student Entry)
Taym Pers	Maroul Arvin Ragpala, Samer Ash-Shahid A. Irineo, Jerwynn Larano, Mark Brian Gill	iAcademy	
Tiny Gale	Jeremy Sulit	Vancouver Film School (Classical Animation Program) – Canada	Best in Technical (Student Entry)
Work in Progress	Philex Angelo M. Merano	Ateneo de Naga University	

Professional Division
Title	Director/s	Studio	Awards
10 Years in a Nutshell	Jan Yolec Homecillo		
Alab	Tyron Gonzales		
Alistair	Mac Gray De La Peña Grandeza		
Jepoy	Avid Liongoren		
Love Bites	Carl Joseph E. Papa		Grand Winner (Professional Entry); Best Storytelling (Professional Entry); Best in Technical (Professional Entry); Best Production Design (Professional Entry)
Old vs. New	John Paul F. Bonoan		Best Non-Narrative Animation (Professional Entry)
Princess	Simon Givenchy Loredo		Best Regional Entry; Best Non-Narrative Animation

=== Animahenasyon 2019 Finalists ===
Student Division
Title	Director/s	School	Awards
5 Stars	Jeremiah Cuyas	iAcademy	
Bigas	Bryan Almoneda	Ateneo de Naga University	
Cotton Cloud	Kristine Joi Gonzales	University of Makati	Best Non-Narrative Animation
Halcyon Days	Patricia Natasha Solano, Sally Joy R. Barcial	De La Salle–College of Saint Benilde	
Avarus	Ed John Dela Cruz, Naomi Dimaculangan, Reia Simpas	iAcademy	
Chinese, Filipino, Beliefs & Superstitions	Arianne May Sapalaran	CIIT College of Arts and Technology	
Fatherwing	Jose Alejo Jadie	De La Salle–College of Saint Benilde	
Little Brown Brother	Annikka May Cudala	De La Salle–College of Saint Benilde	
OwO	Jessamyne Roux Ado, Jed Mañago, Kathryn Bernalisa Canoso	Top Peg Animation & Creative Studio, Inc.	Audience Choice Award
Perfectly Odd Things	Eugene Patrick Navasca	iAcademy	
Pula	Dominic James Barrios	Ateneo de Naga University	Best in Technical (Student Entry); Best Regional Entry
MEOWBOT3000 VS FISHZILLA	Michael Angelo Dagsaan	University of the Philippines – Diliman	
Pass	Kinn Arden Galdones, Christian Lemuel Ibong	iAcademy	Best Storytelling (Student Entry); Grand Winner (Student Entry)
Proud	Are Jay Peralta	University of Makati	Best Production Design (Student Entry); The John Martin Award

Professional Division
Title	Director/s	Studio	Awards
Billy & Bonnie in All Shapes & Sizes	Ian "Mookie" Tamara, Karla Circe Consolacion, John Cyrolle Vendivil	Toon City Academy	Jury's Special Citation for Production Design and Overall Excellence; Grand Winner (Professional Entry)
Little Boy Blue	Daren Hiwatig	Insider Philippines, Inc.	Best Storytelling (Professional Entry)
Mash&Co – The Magic Hand Lens	Katrin Ann Orbeta	Mash&Co srls	
Iced Gem Biscuits: Fun in Every Bite	Rivelle Mallari	E35 Studios	Best in Technical (Professional Entry)
Magical Holiday	Sofia Dominique Abellera	De La Salle–College of Saint Benilde	Best Non-Narrative Animation (Professional Entry)
Rip Rollerz: Episode 1	Johanna Kaye Bocodin, Marvin Paracuelles, Deborah Tudtud	Fizzbuzz, Inc.	Best Production Design (Professional Entry)

=== Animahenasyon 2020 Finalists ===
Student Division
Title	Director/s	School	Awards
Sarung Banggi	Dominic James B. Barrios	Ateneo de Naga University	3rd Grand Winner
Trust Fall	Kristine Francisco	De La Salle–College of Saint Benilde	5th Grand Winner
Flush	Roland Cartagena	University of the Philippines Film Institute	
Sojourn of the Phantasm	Jose Ian Lucas S. Lacorte		
Lone	James Eraño Mariscal		

Professional Division
Title	Director/s	Studio	Awards
Ella Arcangel	Mervin Malonzo	Haliya Publishing	1st Grand Winner
Jet and the Pet Rangers	Patrick Apura	Studio Nonego	2nd Grand Winner
Pop Bot	Marvin Paracuelles	Fizzbuzz, Inc.	4th Grand Winner
Stikbot Pilot Anthology	Carlyn Ceniza, Charles Wilson Nakila, Clare Marie Sanchez, Deborah Tudtud, Bryan Velayo		
Megabot: Origins	Carlyn Ceniza, Charles Wilson Nakila		
