= Delana =

Delana may refer to:

- Delana Township, Humboldt County, Iowa, one of twelve townships in Humboldt County, Iowa
- Iliesa Delana (born 1984), Fijian politician and Paralympic high jumper
- Delana R. Eckels (1806–1888), chief justice of the Supreme Court of the Utah Territory
- DeLana Harvick (née Linville; born 1973), American NASCAR team co-owner and manager

== See also ==
- Delan, mixed-use locality in the Bundaberg Region, Queensland, Australia
- Delano (disambiguation)
