= Film Academy of the Philippines =

Philippine film organization and awards body

- Formation: January 5, 1981; 45 years ago
- Type: Government agency
- Purpose: Professionalization of film industry; upskilling and training of AV workers and To give awards and recognition for significant accomplishments of the development of the motion picture industry
- Headquarters: Makati, Metro Manila
- Location: Philippines
- Director-General: Paolo Villaluna
- Main organ: Board of Trustees
- Parent organization: Department of Trade and Industry
- Website: https://filmacademy.gov.ph/

The Film Academy of the Philippines (FAP; also known simply as the Academy) is a professional organization representing the film industry guilds and workers in the Philippines, operating as a government agency attached to and under the administrative supervision of the Department of Trade and Industry.

Founded in 1981, it was patterned after the Academy of Motion Picture Arts and Sciences in the United States and is mandated to support professional development and welfare of film industry workers. It recognizes outstanding achievements in motion pictures through its annual Luna Awards, first presented in 1983, and is in charge of selecting the country's yearly entry for the Best International Feature Film at the Oscars since its establishment.

== History ==
The Film Academy of the Philippines was established on January 5, 1981 through Executive Order No. 640-A as part of the newly created Filipino Motion Picture Development Board (FMPDB), an arm of the Cultural Center of the Philippines, to grant recognition and awards for achievements in motion picture arts and sciences. The inaugural ceremony of the Film Academy of the Philippines Awards was held in 1983, before being officially named the Luna Awards in 2005.

In 2006, the executive order was amended by EO 513 and the oversight over the Academy and the FMPDB, now the Film Development Council of the Philippines, was placed under the Department of Education.

Following the passage of the Philippine Creative Industries Development Act of 2022, the promotion and support for the country's creative industry including the film industry was institutionalized and the Academy's administrative supervision was transferred from the Department of Education to the Department of Trade and Industry, being the lead implementing agency of the passed law, in 2024. Following the restructuring, the Academy will be governed by a board of trustees that is chaired by its director general and co-chaired by the trade secretary.

In October 2024, seeing a need to revamp the Film Academy to help the struggling industry, President Bongbong Marcos Jr. signed EO 70s 2024, "Promoting The Development Of The Philippine Film Industry, Strengthening The Film Academy Of The Philippines," putting the government agency under the administrative supervision of DTI and appointed as Director General the independent director, former DGPI President and Inter Guild Alliance co-founder Paolo Villaluna, who promised inclusivity of stakeholders in the revamping of the agency. While restructuring the agency and awaiting its budget, the new Film Academy began with industry workshops, focus group discussions with stakeholders and has partnered with relevant government agencies for its program.

Previous Director Generals of The Film Academy include Atty Espiridion Laxa, and actors Leo Martinez and Vivian Velez.

== Mandates ==
=== Luna Awards ===
Since its establishment in 1981, the Academy's principal mandate has been to present recognition for achievements in motion pictures in the Philippines, particularly films, artists, and other relevant stakeholders. The Academy has organized the annual Luna Awards since its first ceremony in 1983. It was established as the only peer-voted industry award, with existing award-giving bodies like the FAMAS Awards (established in 1953, one of the oldest in Asia) and Gawad Urian being press and critic awards, respectively.

=== Academy Award for Best International Feature ===
The Academy is the authorized organization approved by the Academy of Motion Picture Arts and Sciences (AMPAS) to create the committee that annually selects the official entry of the Philippines to the Best International Feature Film Oscars.

The Philippines is one of the original countries to submit films for the Best International Feature Film (then called Best Foreign-Language Film) category at the award's establishment at the Oscars in 1956. The country then submitted only four films after that, before the Academy was founded in 1981 and became the fixed body that creates the committee that selects the country's submission annually. The first submissions by the country under the Academy were Of the Flesh in 1984 and This Is My Country in 1985, but made no further submissions until Harvest Home in 1995. Since then, the Academy has submitted a film in all years, with the exception of 2005 because no invitation from AMPAS was sent, according to Director General Leo Martinez, and 2021 due to lack of government funding following the COVID-19 pandemic.

In addition, since 2024, the Academy is also mandated to select films submitted to similar international awards, subject to existing laws, rules, and regulations. In 2026, albeit not being a submission under the country, the Academy supported two films for consideration at the Oscars. These are Agapito for Best Live Action Short and 58th for Best Documentary Feature Film, in addition to the country's Best International Feature Film submission, Filipiñana.

=== Industry professionalization ===
Since 2024, the Academy's mandate includes capacity building, educational programs, assistance, and incentives for workers in the Filipino film industry and is directed to guide, assist, and steer representative guilds and associations toward the professionalization of the industry.

New programs of the restructured Academy include the initiation of professional industry work standards, guild and worker accreditation, a code of ethics handbook, identification cards, grievance and welfare services, upskilling, training, and certifications for industry workers.

== See also ==
- Film awards bodies in the Philippines
- Film Development Council of the Philippines
- List of Philippine submissions for the Academy Award for Best International Feature Film
- Luna Awards
