= The Missing (2023 film) =

2023 Filipino animated film

- 19th Cinemalaya Festival release poster
- Ilocano: Iti Mapukpukaw
- Directed by: Carl Joseph Papa
- Written by: Aica Ganhinhin; Carl Joseph Papa
- Produced by: Geoderic Lomuntad; Dan Villegas
- Starring: Carlo Aquino; Gio Gahol; Dolly de Leon
- Cinematography: Jethro Jamon
- Edited by: Ben Tolentino
- Music by: Teresa Barrozo
- Production companies: Project 8; GMA News and Public Affairs; Terminal Six Post
- Release dates: August 5, 2023 (Cinemalaya); January 7, 2024 (Palm Springs)
- Running time: 90 minutes
- Country: Philippines
- Languages: Ilocano; Filipino

The Missing (Ilocano: Iti Mapukpukaw) is a 2023 Philippine adult animated science fiction drama film co-written and directed by Carl Joseph Papa. Carlo Aquino portrays Eric, an animator without a mouth who encounters and attempts to defeat an alien intent on abducting him after learning that his uncle is dead. It also stars Gio Gahol and Dolly de Leon as Eric's coworker and mother, respectively.

The Missing, which employs rotoscope and traditional animation, is Papa's third feature-length animated film, after Manang Biring (2015), and The Leaving (2018). Papa based the film's story on his personal experiences of sexual abuse and began writing the film in 2019. Filming of live-action scenes began in November 2022 and took four days, followed by rotoscoping by around 90 animators for eight to nine months. The film uses Filipino and Ilocano.

The Missing premiered at the 19th Cinemalaya Independent Film Festival in August 2023, and had its international premiere in January 2024 at the Palm Springs International Film Festival. It was the first animated film submitted by the Philippines for the Academy Award for Best International Feature Film. The film, which received positive reception for its cast performance and animation style, won various awards in the Philippines and in international film festivals, such as the Asia Pacific Screen Award for Best Animated Film Award and the NETPAC award.

== Plot ==
Eric, who works as an animator and does not have a mouth, helps his coworker Carlo in revising animations on a late-night shift. Afterward, Carlo invites Eric to carpool with him and offers to buy drive-thru food in exchange. On their way to Carlo's vehicle, Eric receives a call from his mother Rosalinda to check on Eric's uncle Rogelio at his house.

When Carlo and Eric arrive at Rogelio's house, they discover that he has been dead for days. Eric experiences a panic attack, and Carlo leaves to seek help. While Carlo is gone, Eric is abducted by an alien spaceship. He is taken by an alien who has been searching for him and wants to finish what they started, but he escapes from the spaceship. The next morning, he wakes up on a street, with Carlo and Rosalinda unaware of what happened.

Each time the alien attempts to abduct him, Eric experiences flashbacks of his childhood, including talking with his cousin Precy about an alien that abducts children to experiment on and being with Rogelio in the bathroom. Each attempt costs Eric a body part: his left eye, right ear, genitals, and right hand.

One day, Carlo visits Eric's house, and they prepare to watch a film together. As Carlo goes to a convenience store to buy snacks, Eric is abducted by the alien again. Eric wakes up in his ruined apartment the following morning. Eric responds to a knock and sees Carlo enraged, who leaves him shortly afterward.

Eric visits Rogelio's wake, where he meets Precy, who also has no mouth. After Eric's visit, he encounters a flashback of himself asking Rosalinda, in front of Rogelio, what "jerking off" is. He is then abducted by the alien, who explains that he has to transfer his powers to Eric to save his home planet. Eric is restrained to a metal platform by the alien and begins transferring his power, but Eric disrupts the process due to the pain he is subjected to.

While Eric is panicking from an abduction attempt at his workplace, Carlo asks Eric what is wrong and is told about the alien encounters. Carlo agrees to help Eric hide and brings him to Carlo's house. They eventually drive to avoid the alien throughout the day and devise a plan to destroy the alien. As they sleep inside Carlo's car parked in a gas station, Eric sees a flashback where Rogelio coerces Eric to keep his sexual abuse of him a secret from his mother.

Eric and Carlo arrive at the alien mothership and invade the place using laser guns. Eric finally kills the alien that attempted to transfer his powers, and is constantly following him. Afterward, it is revealed that the alien was his uncle and that Carlo and Eric are in Rosalinda's house. Rosalinda and Carlo comfort Eric under a bed.

The day after, Eric visits Rogelio's grave and digs it up. He finds inside the coffin the body parts he had lost, including a second mouth. After Eric retrieves them and recovers his ability to speak, he discards the portable whiteboard he uses to communicate, quietly approaches Rosalinda and Carlos, and says that he wants to tell them something.

== Cast ==
- Carlo Aquino as Eric
- Gio Gahol as Carlo
- Dolly de Leon as Rosalinda

== Production ==
The Missing is produced by Project 8 Projects and is co-produced with GMA News and Public Affairs and Terminal Six Post. The production was supported by the Film Development Council of the Philippines, CreatePH Films, and the National Commission on Culture and the Arts. It also received a grant from Thai film funding program Purin Pictures.

The Missing is the third feature-length animated film of writer-director Carl Joseph Papa, after Manang Biring (2015), and The Leaving (2018). Papa began working on the film's story, which was based on his personal experience of childhood sexual abuse and interviews with other people, in 2019 and took three years in writing. The Missing utilizes rotoscoping, since Papa, who determined that the film would be animated, wanted to bring viewers a sense of confusion on the character and lead them to question "whether things are real". The film uses traditional 2D hand-drawn animation for flashbacks to evoke childhood happiness among viewers despite a "darker story underneath". The film uses Filipino and Ilocano. The use of Ilocano arrived from Papa's relatives and friends, including his interest in Ilocano culture.

Papa was informed in early 2022 that his story would be part of the 19th Cinemalaya Independent Film Festival. Casting for The Missing began after Papa finished the film's story. The film's main cast, Carlo Aquino, Gio Gahol, and Dolly de Leon, agreed to be included in the film after learning of Papa's reason for doing the film and before reading the script. Filming of live action scenes commenced on November 30, 2022, and took four days in a green screen studio. Post-production started in December. Animation work, including rotoscoping, began in January and took seven to eight months involving a team of more than 90 animators.

== Release ==
The Missing was premiered at the 19th Cinemalaya Independent Film Festival on August 5, 2023. It was also the first feature-length animated film of the Cinemalaya Philippine Independent Film Festival, and had its international premiere at the 35th Palm Springs International Film Festival on January 7, 2024, in California, United States.

On September 29, 2023, the Film Development Council of the Philippines (FDCP) and the Film Academy of the Philippines announced The Missing as the Philippine entry for the Best International Feature Film category at the 96th Academy Awards, making it the first animated film submitted by the Philippines. The FDCP provided a ₱1 million grant for the marketing campaign of The Missing.

== Reception ==
On the review aggregator website Rotten Tomatoes, 100% of 11 critics' reviews are positive, with an average rating of 7.60/10. The Missing was the highest-grossing film in the 19th Cinemalaya Independent Film Festival.

Reviewers provided general positive reception for the actors' performances. ABS-CBN's Fred Hawson applauded the performances of Aquino, Gahol, and de Leon, recognizing the "difficulty of acting with a greenscreen" and their "being overlain by computer graphics". Similarly, reviewers complimented de Leon's ability to portray emotion through body language in an animated film and Aquino's performance of a mouthless character.

The film's use of animation was also discussed. Rappler's Ryan Oquiza praised the film's use of rotoscope to explore themes of grief, identity, and trauma. Oquiza also described the animation as a success in the "context of local filmmaking, focusing the production's task of finding a rotoscoping team and relying on financial grants. Hawson found the flashbacks "more mature than [the film's] R13 rating" as they were animated with "kindergarten crayon drawings", narrated by a child's voice, and juxtaposed with a black scribble obscuring the antagonist. The flashbacks' animation style also contrasts with the film's theme on childhood sexual abuse, The Philippine Star's Eric Cabahug notes as he compares The Missing to Papa's previously released adult animated films such as The Leaving and Manang Biring. Eric's body parts also turn into transparent checkerboards when abducted, which Philippine Daily Inquirer's Anndrei Yuvallos interpreted as "a nod" to the animation team.

Reviews have also commented on the film's plot structure. Protagonist Eric follows the hero's journey archetype, where he defeats the alien and faces his trauma, and has a sidekick Carlo, according to Spot's Christa De La Cruz. They also noticed the aspect of unconditionally following elders, the fear of not being believed on, and the fear disturbing family ties represented in the film. International Cinephile Society's Matthew Joseph Jenner describes the film as "odd and disquieting in a way that can be difficult to understand," but provides a positive review on the film's writing. The genre of the film was ambiguous for Jenner as it incorporates elements of psychological horror, apocalyptic science fiction, romantic comedy and family melodrama. He also finds The Missing to have an ambiguous direction, but argues that the film intentionally lacks a "clear conclusion" through its unconventional narrative structure. Although the film's transition between flashbacks and the present day may "feel a bit disjointed at times", the film maintains its narrative of multiple dimensions, including Eric's "journey to reclaim agency", Oquiza argues in a critical review. Eric's loss of his body parts was seen as a metaphor of trauma's effects by several reviewers, which some viewers may find "too literal" for Cabahug.

== Accolades ==
The film won various awards and was nominated in various Philippine film festivals. The film won the Best Sound, Best Animation, and Best Picture awards for the 47th Gawad Urian Award, and the 2024 FAMAS Award for Best Editing. The film won Best Film, Best Supporting Actress (de Leon), and the NETPAC awards in the 19th Cinemalaya Independent Film Festival. The Missing was nominated for the Indie Movie of the Year category of the 40th PMPC Star Awards for Movies and Carl Joseph Papa as a nominee for the film festival's Indie Movie Director of the Year.

The Missing was also screened in international film festivals as a selection. The film won the Best Animated Film Award at the 17th Asia Pacific Screen Awards and the Best Feature Film award at the 17th Animator International Animated Film Festival in Poznań, Poland. It was an official selection for the 23rd New York Asian Film Festival and the 19th Osaka Asian Film Festival.

Year	Award-Giving Body	Category	Recipient(s) and nominee(s)	Result	Ref
2023	19th Cinemalaya Independent Film Festival	Best Film	The Missing	Won	
2023	19th Cinemalaya Independent Film Festival	Best Supporting Actress	Dolly de Leon	Won	
2023	19th Cinemalaya Independent Film Festival	Network for the Promotion of Asian Cinema Award	The Missing	Won	
2024	47th Gawad Urian Award	Best Sound	The Missing	Won	
2024	47th Gawad Urian Award	Best Animation	The Missing	Won	
2024	47th Gawad Urian Award	Best Picture	The Missing	Won	
2024	47th Gawad Urian Award	Best Director	Carl Joseph Papa	Nominated	
2024	47th Gawad Urian Award	Best Screenplay	Carl Joseph Papa	Nominated	
2024	47th Gawad Urian Award	Best Editing	Benjamin Tolentino	Nominated	
2024	47th Gawad Urian Award	Best Music	Lamberto Casas Jr., Alex Tomboc	Nominated	
2024	2024 FAMAS Award	Best Editing	Benjamin Tolentino	Won	
2024	2024 FAMAS Award	Best Picture	The Missing	Nominated	
2024	2024 FAMAS Award	Best Director	Carl Joseph Papa	Nominated	
2024	2024 FAMAS Award	Best Screenplay	Carl Joseph Papa	Nominated	
2024	2024 FAMAS Award	Best Visual Effects	Terminal Six Post	Nominated	
2024	2024 FAMAS Award	Best Music Score	Teresa Barrozo	Nominated	
2024	40th PMPC Star Awards for Movies	Indie Movie of the Year	The Missing	Nominated	
2024	40th PMPC Star Awards for Movies	Indie Movie Director of the Year	Carl Joseph Papa	Nominated	
2024	The EDDYS 2024	Best Picture	Project 8, GMA News and Public Affairs, Terminal Six Post	Nominated	
2024	The EDDYS 2024	Best Director	Carl Joseph Papa	Nominated	
2024	The EDDYS 2024	Best Screenplay	Carl Joseph Papa	Nominated	
2024	The EDDYS 2024	Best Editing	Benjamin Tolentino	Nominated	
2024	The EDDYS 2024	Best Musical Score	Teresa Barrozo	Nominated	
2024	The EDDYS 2024	Best Sound	Lamberto Casas Jr., Alexis Tomboc	Nominated	
2024	The EDDYS 2024	Best Visual Effects	The Missing	Nominated	
2024	35th Palm Springs International Film Festival Film	Best International Feature Film	The Missing	Nominated	
2024	17th Animator International Animated Film Festival	Best Film	The Missing	Won	
2024	17th Asia Pacific Screen Awards	Best Animated Film	The Missing	Won	
2024	23rd New York Asian Film Festival	Best Film	The Missing	Nominated	
2024	28th Fantasia International Film Festival	Special Jury Mention – Satoshi Kon Award	The Missing	Won	
2024	28th Fantasia International Film Festival	Best Feature Film	The Missing	Silver	
2024	2024 Annecy International Animation Film Festival	Contrechamp Section	The Missing	Nominated	

== See also ==
- List of submissions to the 96th Academy Awards for Best Foreign Language Film
- List of Philippine submissions for the Academy Award for Best International Feature Film
