= List of Philippine submissions for the Academy Award for Best International Feature Film =

Best International Feature Film submissions from the Philippines

Highlights
- Debut: 1956
- Submissions: 36
- Nominations: none
- Oscar winners: none

The Philippines has submitted films for the Academy Award for Best International Feature Film (Note: The category was previously named the Academy Award for Best Foreign Language Film, but this was changed to the Academy Award for Best International Feature Film in April 2019, after the Academy deemed the word "Foreign" to be outdated.) since the inception of the category in 1956, when it became the first independent nation in Southeast Asia to join the competition. The award is given annually by the United States Academy of Motion Picture Arts and Sciences (AMPAS) to a feature-length motion picture produced outside the United States that contains primarily non-English dialogue. The "Best Foreign Language Film" category was not created until 1956; however, between 1947 and 1955, the Academy presented a non-competitive Honorary Award for the best foreign language films released in the United States.

As of 2026, the Philippines has submitted thirty-six films, but none of them were nominated.

== History ==
The 1950 biopic Genghis Khan was the first and only Philippine film submitted for consideration for the Honorary Foreign Language Film award, the precursor to the current category, but no award was given to the film or any non-English language films at this feat.

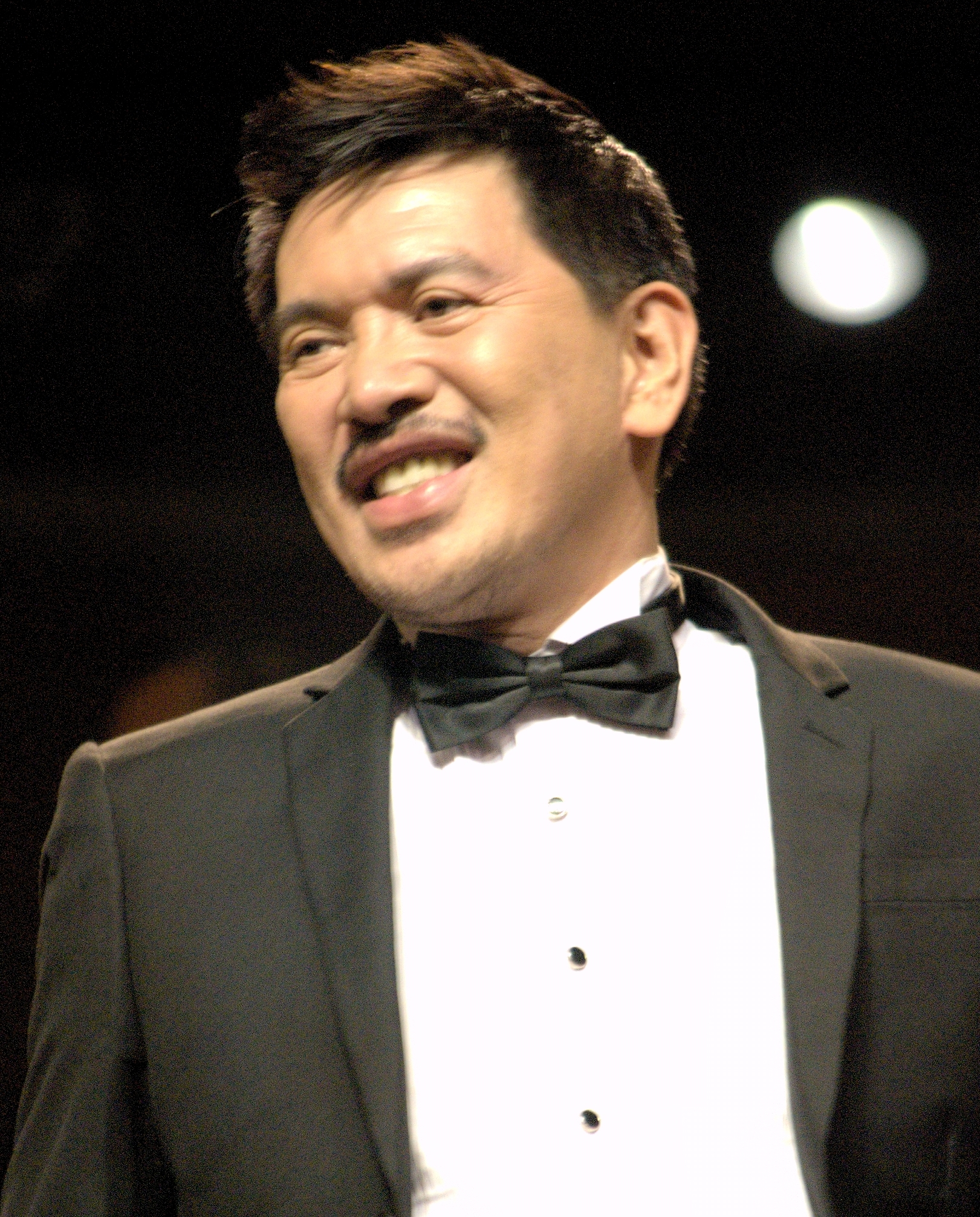
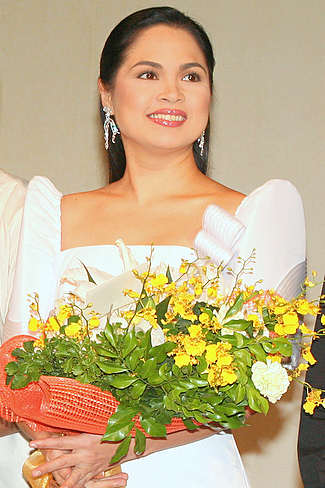
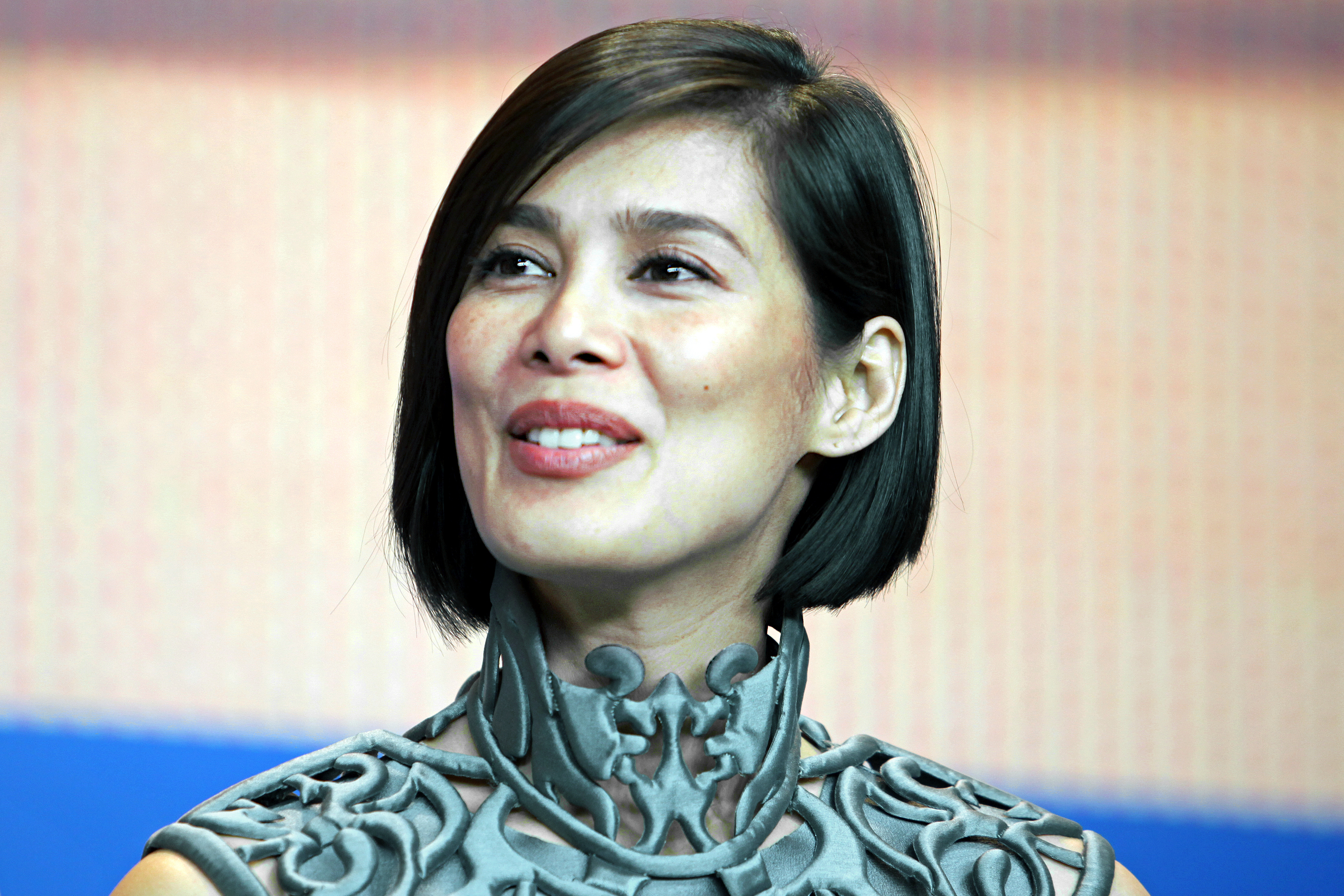
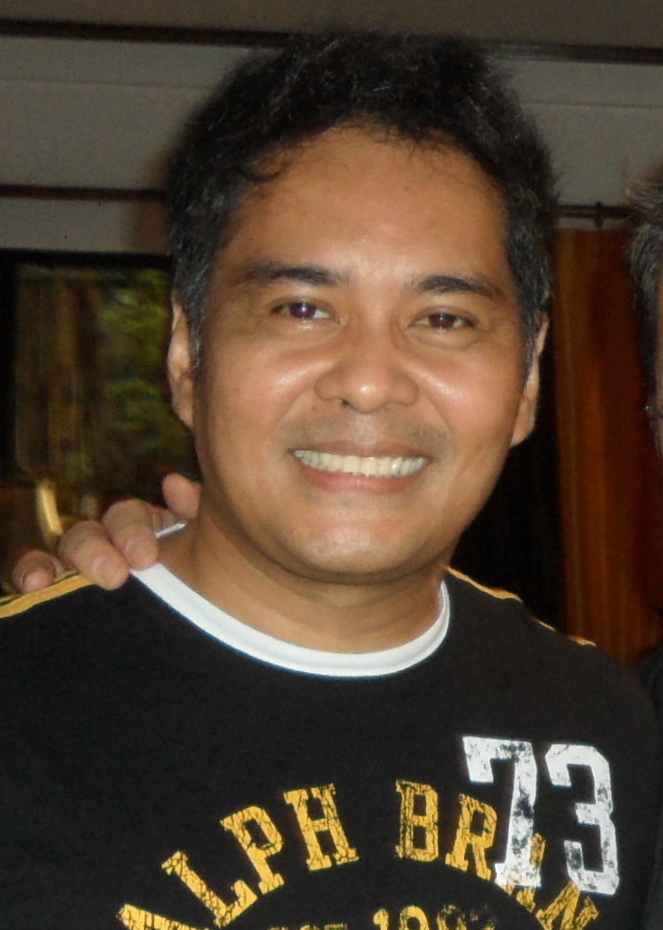
Clockwise from upper left: Two films directed by Brillante Mendoza were submitted; two films starring Judy Ann Santos, including Ploning which she produced, were submitted; John Arcilla starred in three films that were submitted; Angel Aquino was in films submitted in 2004 and 2007.

The Film Academy of the Philippines (FAP) appoints a committee to choose one film among those released that year to be submitted as the Philippines's official entry to the Academy for a nomination for "Best International Feature Film" the following year. The chosen films, along with their English subtitles, are sent to the Academy, where they are screened for the jury.

From 1956 until the establishment of the FAP in 1981, only four films were submitted for consideration: Child of Sorrow (1956), The Moises Padilla Story (1961), Because of a Flower (1967), and Ganito Kami Noon... Paano Kayo Ngayon? (1976). After the FAP was founded, the Philippines submitted Of the Flesh in 1984 and This Is My Country in 1985, but made no further submissions until 1995's Harvest Home. Since then, the FAP has submitted a film in most years. No film was submitted in 2005; Leo Martinez, the director general of the FAP, revealed that the organization had not received an invitation from the Academy. (Note: The Film Academy of the Philippines generally receives an invitation to participate from the Academy of Motion Picture Arts and Sciences. Then FAP director General Leo Martinez confirmed in October 2005 that "the country did not receive an invitation from the Oscars this year"; he further added, "It's not like we can write them and ask for an invitation. It doesn't work that way".) In 2021, the FAP controversially chose not to send an entry as they lacked government funding due to the COVID-19 pandemic.

Filmmakers and actors have each represented the Philippines more than once in this category:

- Marilou Diaz-Abaya and Gil Portes submitted three times, the most for any director, and including two consecutive films each: Diaz Abaya in 1997 and 1998, and Portes in 2001 and 2002.
- Brillante Mendoza, a recipient of the Cannes Film Festival Award for Best Director, directed the 2016 and 2020 submissions. Lav Diaz, a recipient of the Venice Film Festival Award for Golden Lion and Locarno Film Festival Award for Golden Leopard, also directed the 2014 and 2025 submissions, the latter marks the first time for an international co-produced film with international cast and crew.
- Three films starring John Arcilla have been submitted by the Philippines. (Note: John Arcilla co-starred in the 2013 British independent crime drama Metro Manila, which was filmed in the Philippines. The film was later selected as the official submission for the Academy Award for Best International Feature Film at the 86th Academy Awards by the United Kingdom.) Joel Torre has co-starred in three films that were entries in 1984, 1985, and 2000.
- Two of Judy Ann Santos's films, including Ploning (2008), which she produced and starred in, have been submitted. Angel Aquino, Sid Lucero, Phillip Salvador, Vilma Santos, and Jomari Yllana have each represented the Philippines twice as actors in the category.

Carl Joseph Papa's The Missing and Ramona S. Diaz's And So It Begins marked the first animated and documentary films, respectively, to be submitted as the Philippine entry in two consecutive years.

A Filipino-Australian co-production film First Light (2026), directed by James J. Robinson, marks the first Filipino-language film to be selected as the Australian entry for the Best International Feature Film at the 99th Academy Awards, despite not being shortlisted to the Philippine entry.

== Submissions ==
Below is a list of the films that have been submitted by the Philippines for review by the Academy for the award by year and the respective Academy Awards ceremony.

Year (Ceremony)	Film title used in nomination	Original title	Language(s)	Director(s)	Result
1956 (29th)	Child of Sorrow	Anak Dalita	Filipino, English	Lamberto V. Avellana	Not nominated
1961 (34th)	The Moises Padilla Story		Filipino	Gerardo de León	Not nominated
1967 (40th)	Because of a Flower	Dahil sa Isang Bulaklak	Filipino	Luis Nepomuceno	Not nominated
1976 (49th)	This Is How We Were Before... How Are You Doing Now?	Ganito Kami Noon... Paano Kayo Ngayon?	Filipino, English, Spanish	Eddie Romero	Not nominated
1984 (57th)	Of the Flesh	Karnal	Filipino, English	Marilou Diaz-Abaya	Not nominated
1985 (58th)	This Is My Country	Bayan Ko: Kapit sa Patalim	Filipino	Lino Brocka	Not nominated
1995 (68th)	Harvest Home	Inagaw Mo ang Lahat sa Akin	Filipino	Carlos Siguion-Reyna	Not nominated
1996 (69th)	Dead Sure	Segurista	Filipino	Tikoy Aguiluz	Not nominated
1997 (70th)	Miracles	Milagros	Filipino	Marilou Diaz-Abaya	Not nominated
1998 (71st)	In the Navel of the Sea	Sa Pusod ng Dagat	Filipino	Marilou Diaz-Abaya	Not nominated
1999 (72nd)	The Kite	Saranggola	Filipino	Gil Portes	Not nominated
2000 (73rd)	The Child	Anak	Filipino	Rory Quintos	Not nominated
2001 (74th)	In the Bosom of the Enemy	Gatas... Sa Dibdib ng Kaaway	English, Tagalog, Japanese	Gil Portes	Not nominated
2002 (75th)	Small Voices	Mga Munting Tinig	Filipino, English	Gil Portes	Not nominated
2003 (76th)	The '70s	Dekada '70	Filipino	Chito S. Roño	Not nominated
2004 (77th)	Crying Ladies		Filipino, Philippine Hokkien, Mandarin	Mark Meily	Not nominated
2006 (79th)	The Blossoming of Maximo Oliveros	Ang Pagdadalaga ni Maximo Oliveros	Filipino	Auraeus Solito	Not nominated
2007 (80th)	Donsol		Filipino, Bicolano	Adolfo Alix, Jr.	Not nominated
2008 (81st)	Ploning		Cuyonon, Filipino, Tagalog, Taiwanese Hokkien	Dante Nico Garcia	Not nominated
2009 (82nd)	Grandpa Is Dead	Ded na si Lolo	Filipino	Soxie Topacio	Not nominated
2010 (83rd)	Noy		Filipino, English	Dondon Santos	Not nominated
2011 (84th)	The Woman in the Septic Tank	Ang Babae sa Septic Tank	Filipino	Marlon Rivera	Not nominated
2012 (85th)	Bwakaw		Filipino	Jun Lana	Not nominated
2013 (86th)	Transit		Filipino, Tagalog, English, Hebrew	Hannah Espia	Not nominated
2014 (87th)	Norte, the End of History	Norte, Hangganan ng Kasaysayan	Filipino, English	Lav Diaz	Not nominated
2015 (88th)	Heneral Luna		Filipino, Spanish, English	Jerrold Tarog	Not nominated
2016 (89th)	Ma' Rosa		Filipino	Brillante Mendoza	Not nominated
2017 (90th)	Birdshot		Filipino	Mikhail Red	Not nominated
2018 (91st)	Signal Rock		Filipino	Chito S. Roño	Not nominated
2019 (92nd)	Verdict		Filipino	Raymund Ribay Gutierrez	Not nominated
2020 (93rd)	Mindanao		Filipino	Brillante Mendoza	Not nominated
2022 (95th)	On the Job: The Missing 8		Filipino	Erik Matti	Not nominated
2023 (96th)	The Missing	Iti Mapukpukaw	Ilocano, Filipino	Carl Joseph Papa	Not nominated
2024 (97th)	And So It Begins		Filipino, English	Ramona S. Diaz	Not nominated
2025 (98th)	Magellan	Magalhães	Portuguese, Spanish, Cebuano, French	Lav Diaz	Not nominated
2026 (98th)	Filipiñana		Filipino, English, Ilocano	Rafael Manuel	Pending

== Shortlisted films ==
Each year since 2012, the Film Academy of the Philippines has announced shortlists prior to announcing the official candidate to the Academy Awards. The following films were shortlisted by the Philippines but not selected as the final candidate:

Year	Film
2012	A Mother's Story · Busong · Captive · The Dance of Two Left Feet · Manila Kingpin: The Asiong Salonga Story · Graceland · Mga Mumunting Lihim · Migrante · Segunda Mano · The Witness
2016	A Lullaby to the Sorrowful Mystery · The Agony and Fury of Brother Puli · Dukot · Felix Manalo · Honor Thy Father · Ordinary People · Shadow Behind the Moon · Tuos
2017	1st SEM · Die Beautiful · Jesus is Dead · I See You · Sunday Beauty Queen · The Manananggal at Unit 23B · The Sun Behind You · Triptiko
2023	A Very Good Girl · About Us But Not About Us · Ang Duyan ng Magiting · Family Matters · I Love Lizzy · Mamasapano: Now It Can Be Told
2025	Food Delivery: Fresh from the West Philippine Sea · Green Bones · Hello, Love, Again · Some Nights I Feel Like Walking · Song of the Fireflies · Sunshine
2026	All the Things I Leave You · 58th · I'mPerfect · Manila's Finest · Quezon · Silenced Nights · Sisa

== See also ==
- List of countries by number of Academy Awards for Best International Feature Film
- List of Academy Award winners and nominees for Best International Feature Film
- List of Academy Award–winning foreign-language films
- List of Philippine Academy Award winners, nominees and shortlists
- Cinema of the Philippines
