= Delano =

Delano or DeLano may refer to:

== Places in the United States ==
- Delano, California
- Delano, Wichita, Kansas, a neighborhood in Wichita and former community before merging with Wichita
- Delano, Minnesota
- Delano, Nevada
- Delano, Pennsylvania
- Delano, Tennessee
- Delano Township, Pennsylvania
- Delano Peak, a mountain in Utah
- Delano Hotel, Miami Beach
- Delano Las Vegas, a hotel within the Mandalay Bay complex in Las Vegas, now known as W Las Vegas
- Mount Delano, a mountain in Montana

== Other uses ==
- Delano grape strike in California, US
- DeLano Scientific LLC
- The Delano 7, a fictional spacecraft in the Metroid franchise

== See also ==
- Delana (disambiguation)
- Delanoë
