= Erlinda Villalobos =

Filipina actress (1942–2026)

- Born: September 1, 1942
- Died: October 11, 2026 (aged 84)
- Occupation: Actress
- Notable work: Manang Biring (2015)

Erlinda Villalobos (September 1, 1942 – October 11, 2026) was a Filipino film, radio and television actress.

== Career ==
=== Early years ===
Erlinda Villalobos started her career in the entertainment industry as a radio talent with ABS-CBN Iloilo working there until the administration of President Ferdinand Marcos closed the ABS-CBN during the martial law era. Villalobos moved to Bacolod, working at the Radio Mindanao Network from 1974 to 1983.

In Bacolod, she met fellow voice talent and character actress Vangie Labalan who convinced her to become an actress in Manila. Labalan recommended Villalobos to producers in the capital.

In Manila, Villalobos did radio commercials, using her fluency in the Cebuano, Ilonggo and Filipino languages. From the 1980s and 1990s, she worked as dubbing supervisor for Synch Masters, a company of Labalan which dubbed Mexican telenovelas and anime shows in Filipino.

She was recommended by Labaran to appear in the 1990s television show Pira-pirasong Pangarap. Director Joel Lamangan was satisfied by Villalobos' performance, with the actress appearing in eight episodes in total. She later appeared in Bakekang (2006) and Momay (2010). She still did radio, doing work for drama shows May Kurot sa Puso and Ito ang Buhay Ko for Radyo Inquirer from 2010 to 2011.

=== Later years ===
Villabos made her debut in the indie film industry in the 2011 Cinemalaya film Niño.

Villabos' best known work was the 2015 film Manang Biring, depicting an eponymous elderly woman who was diagnosed terminal cancer. She considered the 2013 Cinemalaya film Ekstra as her breakthrough film, having the opportunity to act alongside Vilma Santos.

Villalobos appeared in other films such as Bambanti (2015), Pamilya Ordinaryo (2016), Smaller and Smaller Circles (2017), Glorious (2018), Bahay na Pula (2022), Firefly (2023), Mallari (2023), The Happy Homes of Diane Hilario (2025) and Until She Remembers (2026). In television, Villalobos appeared in Alyas Robin Hood, Ang Probinsyano, Batang Quiapo, Lolong.

Her last film was Amir, which is expected to be released at the 2026 Metro Manila Film Festival.

== Personal life and death ==
Erlinda Villalobos was previously married. She was already a widow when she moved to Manila sometime in or after the 1980s. She died on October 11, 2026, due to pneumonia.
