= 58th (film) =

2026 Philippine adult animated film

- Theatrical release poster
- Directed by: Carl Joseph Papa
- Written by: Aica Riz Ganhinhin; Carl Joseph Papa
- Produced by: Nessa Valdellon
- Starring: Glaiza de Castro; Ricky Davao
- Cinematography: Jethro Aaron Jamon
- Edited by: Benjamin Tolentino
- Music by: Arvy Dimaculangan
- Production companies: GMA Pictures; GMA Public Affairs
- Distributed by: GMA Pictures
- Release dates: January 31, 2026 (Rotterdam); September 16, 2026 (Philippines)
- Running time: 86 minutes
- Country: Philippines
- Languages: Filipino; English; Cebuano

58th is a 2026 Philippine adult animated biographical drama film directed by Carl Joseph Papa, from a screenplay co-written with Aica Riz Ganhinhin. Filmed entirely as a docudrama, presenting both archive footages based on actual events and actors dramatized re-enactments in a style of documentary film with rotoscoping animation, the film revolves to the last numbered victim's daughter following the event of the 2009 Maguindanao massacre.

The film was premiered on January 31, 2026, at the Rotterdam Film Festival, and in the Contrechamp section of the 2026 Annecy International Animation Film Festival.

== Premise ==
The film will tell the story of the family of Bebot Momay, who was considered the 58th victim of the crime, although his body was never found.

— GMA Public Affairs,

== Cast ==
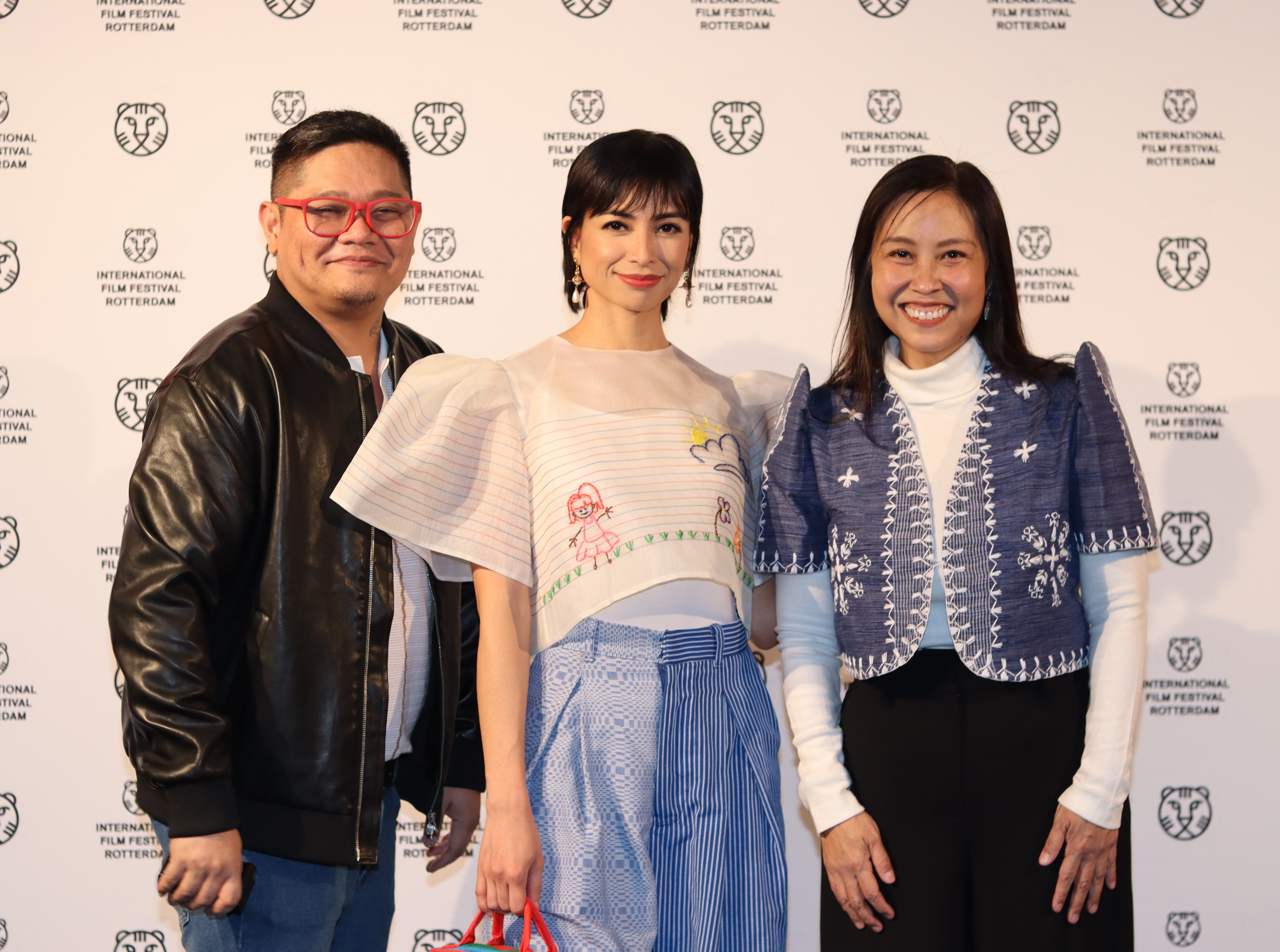
Carl Joseph Papa, Glaiza de Castro and Nessa Valdellon at premiere during the IFFR 2026

- Glaiza de Castro as Maria Reynafe Castillo, a daughter of the missing photojournalist.
- Ricky Davao as Reynaldo "Bebot" Momay, a photojournalist who oversaw the horrors of Maguindanao massacre and is currently the 58th victim.

Mikoy Morales, Biboy Ramirez, Marco Masa and Zyren Dela Cruz were cast in undisclosed roles.

== Production ==
=== Development ===
After the completion of Carl Joseph Papa's third film Iti Mapukpukaw, Papa co-writes and directs a documentary about the massacre in 2009, collaborating with GMA Public Affairs once again. Aica Riz Ganhinhin, a frequent collaborator of Papa, serves as a co-writer in the film.

=== Casting and filming ===
Glaiza de Castro offered the lead role as the daughter of Reynaldo Momay, alongside Ricky Davao, Mikoy Morales, Biboy Ramirez, Marco Masa, and Zyren Dela Cruz are announced to be part of the cast line-up.

The film recorded in live-action, mostly through screencast, which only took around a week. After filming was completed, Davao died on May 1, 2025, making 58th his final film role.

=== Animation ===
The animation processed rotoscoping techniques, similar to Papa's previous films, with over a hundred animators during post-production. Real-life archive footages from the aftermath were mostly used in the film.

== Release ==
58th was premiered on January 31, 2026, at the International Film Festival Rotterdam as a part of Harbour program, making GMA Pictures' first feature film ever to be selected. The film had its Philippine premiere on August 13 at the Shangri-La Plaza Red Carpet Premiere Theatre during the 2026 Cinemalaya Independent Film Festival. 58th is also being screened at Shangri-La Plaza Red Carpet Cinemas from September 16 to 22, 2026.

It is among the eight films in contention to represent the Philippines at the 99th Academy Awards for Best International Feature Film. The film won the Facing the Edge award at the 2026 Doc Edge in New Zealand.

== See also ==
- On The Job: The Missing 8, a 2021 film sequel partly inspired by the massacre and disappearance.
- Adult animation in the Philippines
