= Delanoë =

Delanoë is a Francophone surname derived from "de la noue" meaning "from the mud", and may refer to:

- Bertrand Delanoë (born 1950), French politician and former mayor of Paris
- Pierre Delanoë (1918–2006), French songwriter

== See also ==
- Delano (disambiguation)
