= Sony CCD-VX3 =

Digital camera released in 1993

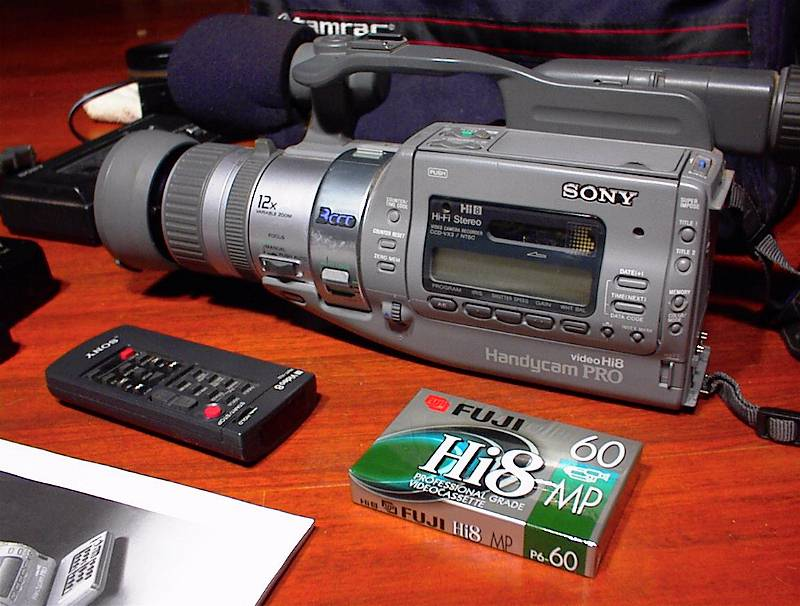
Sony CCD-VX3 with accessories.

Sony CCD-VX3 (also known as CCD-VX1 in PAL markets and in Japan) is a Hi-8 camcorder noteworthy for being the first handheld camcorder to feature trichroic imaging. It was released to the North American market in 1992 at a street cost of about US$3500.

The image is created using three 1/3" CCD chips by prismatically splitting the optics into red, green, and blue, and processing each of these channels individually; this preserves quality especially with red hues. The camera imaged in 410,000 pixels with horizontal resolution of better than 530 lines.

During the mid-1990s, Sony dropped Hi-8 in favor of the emerging DV format, and as a result the CCD-VX3 was discontinued in September 1995. However the CCD-VX3 went on to serve as the framework for a line of professional DV cameras, including the DCR-VX1000, DCR-VX9000, and DSR-200.
