= IAcademy =

Private college in Makati, Philippines

iACADEMY
- Information and Communications Technology Academy
- Motto: Dare to be different. Be a Game Changer.
- Type: Private
- Established: 2002
- Parent institution: STI Education Systems Holdings, Inc.
- Affiliations: Microsoft, Wacom, IBM, Toon Boom Animation
- Religious affiliation: Nonsectarian
- President: Vanessa L. Tanco (also Chief Executive Officer)
- Location: iACADEMY Nexus Campus: 7434 Yakal St., Brgy. San Antonio, Makati, Philippines iACADEMY Cebu Campus: 5F Filinvest Cebu Cyberzone Tower 2, W. Geonzon St., Apas, Cebu City, Philippines; 14°33′37″N 121°00′29″E
- Campus: Urban
- Colours: Blue and white
- Nickname: Game Changers
- Website: www.iacademy.edu.ph
- Location in Metro Manila Location in Luzon Location in the Philippines

Information and Communications Technology Academy, better known as iAcademy (stylized as iACADEMY), is a private, non-sectarian educational institution in the Philippines. The college offers specialized Senior High School and Undergraduate programs in fields relating to computer science, game development, multimedia arts, animation, and business management.

The college has two campuses: iACADEMY Nexus in Yakal, located in the Makati Central Business District and the Cebu Campus, which was formally inaugurated in 2023.

== History ==
Founded in 2002, iACADEMY offers specialized degree programs in BS computer science with specialization in software engineering, BS computer science with specialization in cloud computing specialization track in partnership with Amazon Web Services, BS computer science with specialization in data science specialization track, BS information technology with specialization in web development, BS Bachelor of Science in entertainment and multimedia computing game development, BS business administration with specialization in marketing management, BS in accountancy, BS in real estate management, BA in psychology, BA fashion design and technology, BA multimedia arts and design, BS in animation, and BA in film and visual effects. In 2007, iACADEMY was granted permission by the Commission on Higher Education, to offer the first Bachelor of Science animation program in the Philippines. It is one of the first college institutions in the Philippines to offer BS in Animation. iACADEMY's School of Continuing Education offers similar short courses aimed at working professionals.

iACADEMY uses an industry-aligned curriculum in its degree programs that is focused in computing, business, and design. The four-year programs culminate in a six-month, 960-hour internship program that the students have to go through before graduating.

In 2014, iACADEMY moved to a new campus in Buendia to house its growing student population. On the same year, iACADEMY signed a Memorandum of Understanding with Aboitiz Weather Philippines to develop a website and application for a faster and more user-friendly experience on weather reports.

iACADEMY was also able to lock down a study tour partnership with Polimoda. Italy's leading school of Fashion and Marketing, as well as a transfer program with De Paul University in Chicago, U.S. The school also, together with the Animation Council of the Philippines (ACPI) also hosted the Animahenasyon 2014, the biggest Animation Festival in the Philippines, drawing thousands of students and professionals to the event.

In 2018, due to its growing student population, iACADEMY opened its second campus, iACADEMY Nexus, on Yakal Street, Makati.

=== Milestones and partnerships ===
2002 - iACADEMY was established

2009 - iACADEMY became an Authorized Training Partner of Wacom, a Japanese company that produces graphics tablets and related products.It was also designated as the first IBM Center of Excellence in the ASEAN region.

2010 - iACADEMY partnered with Runway Philippines Season 3 & 4. iACADEMY also partnered with TV5 during the first automated elections in the Philippines. Together with DZRH Manila Broadcasting Radio, Manila Broadcasting Company (MBC), Legal Network for Truthful Elections (LENTE), Stratbase, Inc. Public Affairs and Research Consultancy Group, ePLDT, Inc., and Social Weather Stations (SWS), they worked to bring up-to-date election coverage. In the same year, the college was appointed the first IBM Software Center of Excellence in the ASEAN Region and the first Lotus Academic Institute.

2011 - iACADEMY was chosen by Solar Entertainment Corporation to be the official partner-school and workspace of the third season of Project Runway Philippines. In 2019, the school becomes the first and only Toon Boom Center of Excellence in Asia.

2015 - iACADEMY held the first 24-hour game competition called Battle League.

2016 - iACADEMY began offering specialized Senior High School programs.

2017 - iACADEMY began providing training and certification with UNITY, as a Certified Training and Certification Partner. It also became the official partner of the International Game Developers Association in hosting Manila Game Jam 2017 as part of the Global Game Jam in January 2017.

2019 - iACADEMY partnered with PricewaterhouseCoopers for the Accountancy program under the School of Business and Liberal Arts. iACADEMY was also recognized as the first and only Toon Boom Center of Excellence in Asia, the leading supplier of animation software and storyboard software for animation studios and media publishers.

iACADEMY and PythonPH partnered in hosting PyCon APAC 2019, the largest gathering of Python developers in the Asia-Pacific region.

iACADEMY became the first educational institution partner of the Department of Tourism (DOT), and developed a mobile application that houses the travel website of the Philippines, augmented reality promotional materials, films featuring the provinces and the Philippines’ first social distancing app called "Maze".

iACADEMY formed a partnership with Museo ng Kaalamáng Katutubò (MusKKat) where students contributed to the development of MusKKat's marketing plans, promotional and computing materials to raise awareness on the notable Philippine indigenous artifacts.

It also sealed a partnership with Unilab in October 2019 where college students are given the chance to come up with outputs aligned with improving the lives of Unilab's community partners and supporting Unilab's business objectives.

Same year, iACADEMY inked its partnership with the Climate Change Commission (CCC) in the promotion of a climate-resilient and climate-smart Philippines. CCC exhibited 30 of the students’ designs in CTRL+S Now: A Print Exhibition on Climate Change Awareness and Action during Climate Change Consciousness Week.

In 2020, iACADEMY also established a partnership with Temasek Polytechnic in Singapore.

2022 - iACADEMY x ASUS Edukasyon partnership was launched, in cooperation with the School of Business and Liberal Arts.

2023 - iACADEMY launched iNDIEGENIUS Project Lab, which was supported by Netflix. It aims to support voices in the Philippines that have strong regional perspectives by providing young filmmakers with development opportunities to strengthen concepts and to produce short narratives, animation and documentary projects.

In the same year, iACADEMY inked partnerships with corporations from diverse industries, ranging from marketing and finance to technology, game development, and animation. Among these companies are global marketing services firms McCann and Mullenlowe Treyna, financial services providers Macquarie, Metrobank, and Sunlife, video game publisher Ubisoft, technology corporations ASUS and Huawei, animation production house Toon City, as well as the esteemed Unilab pharmaceutical company.

== Academics ==
The college offers Senior High School as well as undergraduate degree programs through its three academic schools: School of Computing, School of Business and Liberal Arts, and School of Design and the Arts. These programs offered include fields mainly in computing, business, liberal arts, the arts, and design.

=== Senior High School Strands and Tracks ===
- Academic Track
  - Arts and Design
- Technical-Professional Track
  - Animation
  - Computer Programming

=== Undergraduate Programs ===
- School of Computing
  - Bachelor of Science in Computer Science
    - Specializations in Software Engineering, Cloud Computing, and Data Science.
  - Bachelor of Science in Entertainment and Media Computing
    - Specialization in Game Development
  - Bachelor of Science in Information Technology
    - Specialization in Web Development
- School of Business and Liberal Arts
  - Bachelor of Science in Accountancy
  - Bachelor of Science in Business Administration
    - Specialization in Marketing Management
  - Bachelor of Science in Digital Media Management
  - Bachelor of Arts in Psychology
  - Bachelor of Science in Real Estate Management
- School of Design and the Arts
  - Bachelor of Science in Animation (Makati Campus)
  - Bachelor of Arts in Animation (Cebu Campus)
  - Bachelor of Arts in Fashion Design and Technology
  - Bachelor of Arts in Film and Visual Effects
  - Bachelor of Arts in Multimedia Arts and Design
  - Bachelor of Arts in Music Production and Sound Design

== Student life ==
The Senior High School program follows the semester calendar which usually starts from August and ends in June, while the college follows a trimester calendar starting from July. New students are welcomed at SOAR (Student Orientation and Registration). An event that is held a week before the start of classes, to introduce the students around the campus.

=== Traditions ===
- SOAR (Student Orientation and Registration) - An event to orient new students to the school
- Creative Camp - Free art workshops
- Battle League - Gaming competition to promote the Game Development industry

=== Student organizations ===
==== Senior High School ====
- Anime Habu
- Basic Integrated Theater Arts Guild of iACT (BiTAG)
- CTRL Dance Troupe
- iACADEMY Junior Software Developers (iJSD)
- iACADEMY Student Council (CS)
- Interactive Media and Gaming Guild
- Magnates - SHS Chapter
- OCTAVE - SHS Chapter
- Prima - SHS Chapter
- SiLAKBO
- Sining na Naglilikha ng Buhay (SinLikHay)
- Student Athletes Society - SHS Chapter
- The Spines
- Vektor
- VELOCiTY - SHS Chapter
- Young Filmmakers Society of iACADEMY (YFS)
- Luminexus Theater Organization

==== College ====
- RHYTHM
- Creative Society
- Filmmakers Society of iACADEMY (FSi)
- iACADEMY Making Positive Action (iMPACT)
- iACADEMY Photography Society (Optics)
- iACADEMY Student Council (CSO)
- iACADEMY Junior Marketing Association (iJMA)
- iACT
- International Games Developers Association of iACADEMY (IGDA)
- Magnates - College Chapter
- OCTAVE - College Chapter
- Pikzel Graphic Design
- Prima - College Chapter
- iACADEMY Compile formerly known as Software Engineering through Academics and Leadership (SEAL)
- Student Athletes Society - College Chapter
- The Game Changers Press (Official Student Publication)
