= The Leaving (film) =

- Filipino: Paglisan
- Directed by: Carl Joseph Papa
- Screenplay by: Carl Joseph Papa; Aica Ganhinhin
- Produced by: Sarah Santos; Angelo Santos
- Starring: Ian Veneracion; Eula Valdez; Khalil Ramos; Junjun Quintana
- Cinematography: Rap Ramirez; Manuel Abanto
- Edited by: Carl Joseph Papa
- Music by: Teresa Barrozo; Jess Carlos
- Animation by: Matthew Ericson Echague
- Color process: Color
- Release date: October 12, 2018
- Running time: 105 minutes
- Country: Philippines
- Language: Filipino

Paglisan (lit. 'The Leaving') is a 2018 Philippine adult animated musical comedy-drama film co-written and directed by Carl Joseph Papa.

== Premise ==
The film revolves around the relationship struggle of a middle-aged couple as the man develops dementia.

== Cast ==
- Ian Veneracion as Crisanto "Cris", the husband of Dolores who is a composer and singer who develops dementia
- Eula Valdez as Dolores "Oreng", the wife of Cris and a former theater actress
- Khalil Ramos as Christian "Ian", the only son of Cris and Oreng based in Singapore. He remains in contact with his parents through video calling
- Junjun Quintana as Paul, Christian's live-in partner
- Carl Joseph Papa as Cris' doctor.

== Production ==
The voice lines and musical scenes for Paglisan were recorded first before the visuals were made in post-production. It utilizes rotoscoping and mix of traditional animation between watercolor painting and sketchbook.

== Release ==
Paglisan was screened in the Philippines as an entry of the 14th Cinema One Originals which began on October 12, 2018.

== Reception ==
Reviewers praised the performances of the film's voice actors their dialogue and musical performances. The execution of the original compositions, including a rendition of "I Can" from 1996 film Do Re Mi also received positive reception.

The film's 2D animation, which uses pastel watercolor, was described as "patchy". Human figures and background items were drawn roughly, as colors were not within the drawing lines, would lag behind figures that move in slow motion, and are not opaque, a review in ABS-CBN News describes. The review notes that the animation style seems rushed by the deadline, but allows the possibility that it may have been intentional to contrast with the detailed artwork and coloration in the final act. Nylon Manila's Elyse Ilagan, by noting that the characters are drawn as outlines to indicate "that they are losing themselves" and that the background changes to reflect the characters' mental state, argues that the artstyle was deliberate. Ilagan praises the animation, which they describe as a mix of sketchbook and watercolor paint, for effectively communicating the characters' conflicts despite the production's simple budget.

Reviewers noticed the change of the film's aspect ratio to widescreen, from the 4:5 aspect ratio throughout the film, during a transition to a monochrome dance scene.

Nylon Manila's Elyse Ilagan commended the film's discussion on mental health by incorporating mental problems "to feel personal rather than stereotypical" and not only as a narrative device.

=== Accolades ===
Accolades received by Broken Heart's Trip
Award	Date of ceremony	Category	Recipient(s)	Result	Ref.
15th Cinema One Originals	October 21, 2018	Best Picture	Paglisan	Won	
15th Cinema One Originals	October 21, 2018	Best Screenplay	Carl Joseph Papa; Aica Ganhinhin	Won	
15th Cinema One Originals	October 21, 2018	Best Sound	Jess Carlos	Won	
15th Cinema One Originals	October 21, 2018	Best Music	Teresa Barrozo	Won	
2019 Gawad Urian Awards	June 18, 2019	Best Director	Carl Joseph Papa	Nominated	
2019 Gawad Urian Awards	June 18, 2019	Best Music	Teresa Barrozo	Nominated	
2019 FAMAS Awards	April 28, 2019	Best Song	"Buhay Teatro"	Won	
2019 FAMAS Awards	April 28, 2019	Best Song	"Ikaw"	Nominated	

== See also ==
- Adult animation in the Philippines
