= Cinema One Originals =

Film festival in the Philippines

- Location: Quezon City, Philippines
- Founded: 2005; 21 years ago
- Hosted by: Cinema One (ABS-CBN Films)
- No. of films: 15
- Language: Filipino and/or other Philippine languages
- Website: cablechannels.abs-cbn.com/cinemaone

The Cinema One Originals Film Festival, commonly known as Cinema One Originals, was an independent film festival in the Philippines organized by ABS-CBN Films. The festival was held annually in the month of November in Quezon City, showcasing the diverse talent and creativity of Filipino filmmaking. The film festival was produced by Cinema One, a cable television network owned by ABS-CBN Corporation. Its last edition was held in 2019.

== 2005 Cinema One Originals Film Festival ==
The film festival ran from July 29–31, 2005. The following films selected for 2005 Competition:

Title	Director	Cast
Anak ng Tinapa	Jon Red	China Conjuanco, Forsythe Cordero, Soliman Cruz, Ryan Eigenmann
Ang Anak ni Brocka	Sigried Barros-Sanchez	Gina Alajar, Phillip Salvador, Bembol Roco, Jaclyn Jose
Dilim	Topel Lee	Mario Magallona, Rica Peralejo, Emilio Garcia, Archie Adamos
Sandalang Bahay	Mark Gary	Albert Martinez, Adriana Agcaoili, Madeleine Nicolas, Tala Santos
Sa North Diversion Road	Dennis Marasigan	John Arcilla, Irma Adlawan, Madeleine Nicolas
Sitak	Liza Cornejo	Carlo Arejola, Angeli Bayani, Daniella Cornejo, Gerry Cornejo

== 2006 Cinema One Originals Film Festival ==
The film festival ran from November 24–26, 2006. The following films selected for 2006 Competition:

Title	Director	Cast
Huling Balyan ng Buhi	Sherad Anthony Sanchez	Ronald Arguelles, Jelieta Mariveles-Ruca, Marilyn Roque, Jun Lizada
Metlogs	Cris Pablo	Paolo Ballesteros, Tyrone Perez, Marky Lopez, Chokoleit, K Brosas
Pandanggo	Dennis Empalmado; Wilfred Allen Galila; Ruelo Lozendo	Chin Chin Gutierrez, Raymond Bagatsing, Andre Tiangco, Vangie Labalan
Raket ni Nanay	Lawrence Fajardo	Mark Gil, Sarsi Emmanuelle, Archie Adamos, Rolando Inocencio
Rekados	Paolo Herras	Meryll Soriano, Eula Valdez, Boots Anson-Roa, Ana Capri
Rome and Juliet	Connie Macatuno	Andrea del Rosario, Mylene Dizon, Rafael Rosell, Tessie Tomas
Seroks	Ed Lejano	Juliana Palermo, Soliman Cruz, Nathan Lopez, Gammy Lopez

== 2007 Cinema One Originals Film Festival ==
The film festival ran from November 30 – December 2, 2007. The following films selected for 2007 Competition:

Title	Director	Cast
Altar	Rico Maria Ilarde	Zanjoe Marudo, Nor Domingo, Dimples Romana, Dido de la Paz
Confessional	Jerrold Tarog; Ruel Dahis Antipuesto	Publio Briones III, Jerrold Tarog, Greg Fernandez, Owee Salva
Maling Akala	Veronica Velasco; Pablo Biglang-awa Jr.	Jodi Sta. Maria, Victor Basa
Prinsesa	Lawrence Fajardo	Romnick Sarmenta, Trina Legaspi, Archie Adamos, Shamaine Buencamino
Tambolista	Adolfo Alix, Jr.	Jiro Manio, Sid Lucero, Coco Martin, Anita Linda

== 2008 Cinema One Originals Film Festival ==
The film festival ran from December 3–10, 2008. The following films selected for 2008 Competition:

Title	Director	Cast
Alon	Ron Bryant	Mark Gil, Charee Pineda, Eula Valdez
Dose	Senedy Que	Yul Servo, Fritz Chavez, Emilio Garcia
Imburnal	Sherad Anthony Sanchez	Brian Monterola, Jelieta Mariveles-Ruca, Allen Lumanog
Kolorete	Ruelo Lozendo	Roeder, Jean Judith Javier, Angeli Bayani
MotorCYCLE	Jon Red	Jason Abalos, Nonie Buencamino, Kat Alano
UPCAT	Roman Olivarez	Felix Roco, Joseph Roble, Hiyasmin Neri
Yanggaw	Richard Somes	Ronnie Lazaro, Joel Torre, Tetchie Agbayani

== 2009 Cinema One Originals Film Festival ==
The film festival ran from November 13–17, 2009. The following films selected for 2009 Competition:

Title	Director	Cast
Bala-Bala	Melvin Brito	Micah Muñoz, Rold Salamat, Angel Jacob, Jao Mapa
Paano ko Sasabihin?	Richard Legaspi	Erich Gonzales, Enchong Dee
Maximus & Minimus	Nap Jamir	Cai Cortez, Mikel Campos, Malou Crisologo, Baron Geisler
Si Baning, Si Maymay at ang Asong Si Bobo	Rommel Tolentino	Joana Jean Evangelista, Jan Harley Hicana, Simon Ibarra, Gene Karley Largueza
Wanted: Border	Ray Gibraltar	Rosanna Roces, Joy Louise Evidente, Kristoffer Rhys Grabato, Publio Briones III

== 2010 Cinema One Originals Film Festival ==
The film festival ran from November 10–16, 2010. The following films selected for 2010 Competition:

Title	Director	Cast
Ang Damgo ni Eleuteria Kirschbaum	Remton Zuasola	Donna Gimeno, Suzette Ranillo, Alex Uypuanco
Astro Mayabang	Jason Paul Laxamana	Arron Villaflor, Megan Young, John Lapus, Marco Morales
Dagim	Joaquin Pedro Valdes	Marc Abaya, Luis Alandy, Bembol Roco
Ishmael	Richard Somes	Ronnie Lazaro, Mark Gil, Pen Medina
Layang Bilanggo	Michael Angelo Dagnalan	Pen Medina, Miriam Quiambao, Mailes Kanapi
Third World Happy	EJ Salcedo	Sam Milby, Jodi Sta. Maria
Tsardyer	Sigfreid Barros-Sanchez	Dimples Romana, Jhong Hilario

== 2011 Cinema One Originals Film Festival ==
The film festival ran from November 9–15, 2011. The following films selected for 2011 Competition:

Title	Director	Cast
Anatomiya ng Korupsiyon	Dennis Marasigan	Maricar Reyes, Sid Lucero
Big Boy	Shireen Seno	Ian Lomongo, Pam Miras
Cartas de la Soledad	Gutierrez 'Teng' Mangansakan II	Perry Dizon, Mayka Lintongan, Alexis Libres
Di Ingon Nato (Not Like Us)	Ivan Zaldarriaga; Brandon Relucio	Mercedes Cabral
Ka Oryang	Sari Dalena	Alessandra de Rossi, Joem Bascon, Emilio Garcia, Alex Vincent Medina
Mga Anino sa Tanghaling Tapat	Ivy Universe Baldoza	Martha Nikko Comia, Althea Vega
My Paranormal Romance	Victor Villanueva	Phoebe Kaye Fernandez, Van Roxas, Paul Jake Castillo, Publio Briones III
Sa Ilalim ng Tulay	Earl Bontuyan	Bong Cabrera, Cris Pasturan
Sa Kanto ng Ulap at Lupa	Mes de Guzman	Japo Escobedo, Jeremie Cercenia, Zanderson Vicente
Six Degrees of Separation from Lilia Cuntapay	Antoinette Jadaone	Lilia Cuntapay, Geraldine Villamil

== 2012 Cinema One Originals Film Festival ==
The film festival ran from November 28 – December 9, 2012.

=== Plus Category ===
The following films contending for 2012 Plus Category:

Title	Director	Cast
Baybayin	Auraeus Solito	Alessandra de Rossi, Assunta de Rossi, Adrian Sebastian
Mater Dolorosa	Adolfo Alix, Jr.	Gina Alajar, Alessandra de Rossi, Cogie Domingo, Carlo Aquino, Joem Bascon, Mercedes Cabral
Mariposa sa Hawla ng Gabi	Richard Somes	Erich Gonzales, Alfred Vargas, Joel Torre

=== Currents Category ===
The following films contending for 2012 Currents Category:

Title	Director	Cast
Aberya	Christian Linaban	Will Devaughn, Mercedes Cabral, Iwa Moto, Nicholas Varela
Anak Araw	Gym Lumbera	Jay De La Vega
Ang Paglalakbay Ng Mga Bituin Sa Gabing Madilim	Arnel Mardoquio	Fe “Gingging” Hyde, Irish Karl Monsanto, Roger Gonzales, Glory Pearl Dy
Catnip	Kevin Dayrit	Lauren Young, Maxene Magalona
Edsa XXX	Khavn De La Cruz	Epy Quizon, Althea Vega, Sheree Cabrera, Bong Cabrera
Mamay Umeng	Dwein Baltazar	Sue Prado
Melodrama Negra	Ma. Isabel Legarda	Gee Canlas, Bong Cabrera, Sheng Belmonte, Ria Garcia, Mara Lopez, Bembol Roco
Palitan	Ato Bautista	Mara Lopez, Alex Vincent Medina, Mon Confiado
Pascalina	Pam Miras	Maria Veronica Santiago, Peewee O’Hara, Cara Eriguel, Alex Vincent Medina
Slumber Party	Emmanuel Dela Cruz	Markki Stroem, Archie Alemania, RK Bagatsing

== 2013 Cinema One Originals Film Festival ==
The film festival ran from November 11–19, 2013.

=== Plus Category ===
The following films contending for 2013 Plus Category:

Title	Director	Cast
Alamat ni China Doll	Adolfo Alix, Jr.	Angelica Panganiban, Cherry Pie Picache, Cesar Montano, Phillip Salvador
Kabisera	Alfonso “Borgy” Torre III	Joel Torre, Art Acuña, Bing Pimentel, Bernard Palanca, Ketchup Eusebio, Meryll Soriano
Sitio	Mes de Guzman	John Prats, Ria Garcia, Anja Aguilar, Arnold Reyes
Woman of the Ruins	Keith Sicat	Alessandra de Rossi, Art Acuña, Chanel Latorre, Elizabeth Oropesa, Peque Gallaga
Blue Bustamante	Miko Livelo	Joem Bascon, Jun Sabayton, Dimples Romana, Jhiz Deocareza

=== Currents Category ===
The following films contending for 2013 Currents Category:

Title	Director	Cast
Angustia	Kristian Cordero	Alex Vincent Medina, Maria Isabel Lopez, Michelle Smith
Ang Pagbabalat ng Ahas	Timmy Harn	Mervin Brondial, Kay Brondial, Sebastian Karl Sanchez, Jaime Fabregas
Islands	Whammy Alcarazen	Luis Alandy, Benjamin Alves, Meryll Soriano, Irma Adlawan, Peque Gallaga
Bukas Na Lang Sapagkat Gabi Na	Jet Leyco	Nika Santiago, Raul Morit, Dan de Guzman
Iskalawags	Keith Deligero	Kerwin Otida, Reynaldo Formentera, Windel Otida
Philippino Story	Benjamin Garcia	Mark Gil, Jun-Jun Quintana, Benjamin Alves
Shift	Siege Ledesma	Yeng Constantino, Felix Roco
Bendor	Ralston Jover	Vivian Velez, Chanel Latorre
Riddles of my Homecoming	Arnel Mardoquio	Fe Hyde, Perry Dizon, Madz Garcia
Saturday Night Chills	Ian Loreños	Rayver Cruz, Matteo Guidicelli, Joseph Marco

== 2014 Cinema One Originals Film Festival ==
The film festival ran from November 9 to 18, 2014. There is only one category for 2014. Ten full-length feature films competed this year. (There were also screenings for six short films, five restored classics, and seven Asian films.) The following are the contending films:

Title	Director	Cast	Awards
The Babysitters	Paolo O'Hara	Jason Gainza, Katya Santos, Jhiz Deocareza	
Bitukang Manok	Alec Figuracion	Missy Maramara, Guji Lorenzana, Ken Anderson, Mara Lopez, Teri Malvar	Best Cinematography (Aditya Kumar)
Esprit de Corps	Kanakan-Balintagos	Sandino Martin, JC Santos, Lharby Policarpio, Garry Lim	Best Director (Kanakan-Balintagos); Best Actor (Sandino Martin); Best Production Design (Hai Balbuena)
Hindi Sila Tatanda	Malay Javier	Kean Cipriano, Dawn Jimenez, Mara Lopez, Ketchup Eusebio	Best Musical Score (Tengal Drilon)
Lorna	Sigrid Andrea Bernardo	Shamaine Buencamino, Lav Diaz, Felix Roco, Maria Isabel Lopez, Raquel Villavicencio	Best Supporting Actress (Maria Isabel Lopez)
Red	Jay Abello	Jericho Rosales, Mercedes Cabral, Nico Antonio, Mylene Dizon, JM Rodriguez	Best Screenplay (Jay Abello & Dwight Gaston)
Seoul Mates	Nash Ang	Mimi Juareza, Ji Soo	
Soap Opera	Remton Zuasola	Lovi Poe, Rocco Nacino, Bugoy Cariño, Matt Daclan, Natileigh Sitoy, Chris Perris, Lex Zander Flores, Mercedes Cabral	Best Actor (Matt Daclan)
That Thing Called Tadhana	Antoinette Jadaone	Angelica Panganiban, JM de Guzman	Best Actress (Angelica Panganiban); Audience Choice; Champion Bughaw Award for Full-length Feature
Violator	Eduardo Dayao	Joel Lamangan, Victor Neri, Alfie Apodaca, RK Bagatsing, Anthony Falcon, Andy Bais	Best Picture; Best Supporting Actor (Andy Bais); Best Editing (Lawrence Ang); Best Sound (Corinne de San Jose)

== 2015 Cinema One Originals Film Festival ==
The film festival ran from November 9 to 17, 2015. There are nine films in competition for this year, which had the tagline "Kakaiba Ka Ba?" There were also screenings for two special presentation films, four Filipino classics, 10 short films, and 12 foreign films.

Title	Director	Cast	Awards
Baka Siguro Yata	Joel Ferrer	Bangs Garcia, Dino Pastrana, Cherie Gil, Ricky Davao	Audience Choice Award; Best Actor (Dino Pastrano)
Bukod Kang Pinagpala	Sheron Dayoc	Bing Pimentel, Maxie Eigenmann, Paolo Paraiso, Lou Veloso	Best Sound (Jess Carlos); Best Production Design (Harley Alcasid)
The Comeback	Ivan Andrew Payawal	Kaye Abad, Sheena Ramos, Adrienne Vergara, Julia Enriquez, Bea Galvez, Matt Evans, Patrick Garcia	
Dahling Nick	Sari Dalena	Raymond Bagatsing, Alessandra de Rossi, Maria Isabel Lopez	
Dayang Asu	Bor Ocampo	Ricky Davao, Junjun Quintana, Inna Tuason	Best Director (Bor Ocampo); Best Cinematography (Albert Banzon)
Hamog	Ralston Jover	Zaijan Jaranilla, Therese Malvar, Sam Quintana, Bor Lentejas, OJ Mariano, Anna Luna	Jury Award; Best Actress (Therese Malvar); Best Supporting Actor (Bor Lentejas); Best Editing (Charliebebs Gohetia)
Manang Biring	Carl Joseph Papa	Erlinda Villalobos, Mailes Kanapi	Best Film; Champion Bughaw Award; Best Music (Dinno Christopher Parafina)
Mga Rebeldeng May Kaso	Raymond Red	Felix Roco, Nicco Manalo, Epy Quizon, Earl Ignacio, Angela Cortez	
Miss Bulalacao	Ara Chawdhury	Russ Ligtas, Tessie Tomas, Chai Fonacier, Mon Confiado, Ferdinand Mesias	Best Supporting Actress (Chai Fonacier); Best Screenplay (Ara Chawdhury)

== 2016 Cinema One Originals Film Festival ==
The film festival ran from November 14 to 22, 2016. There are ten films in competition for this year, which had the tagline "Anong tingin mo?" The competition also opened itself to documentaries.

=== Documentary Feature Category ===
Title	Director	Awards
Forbidden Memory	Teng Mangansakan	Best Documentary
Piding	Paolo Picones and Gym Lumbera	
People Power Bombshell: The Diary of Vietnam Rose	John Torres	Special Citation

=== Narrative Feature Category ===
Title	Director	Cast	Awards
2 Cool 2 Be 4gotten	Petersen Vargas	Khalil Ramos, Ethan Salvador, Jameson Blake, Ana Capri, Peewee Ohara, Jomari Angeles, Joel Saracho, Mean Espinosa	Best Picture; Best Supporting Actor (Jameson Blake); Best Cinematography (Carlos Mauricio)
Baka Bukas	Samantha Lee	Jasmine Curtis-Smith, Louise delos Reyes, Kate Alejandrino, Gio Gahol, Nelsito Gomez, Cheska Iñigo, Lexter Tarriela	Best Actress (Jasmine Curtis-Smith); Best Sound; Audience Choice Award
Lily	Keith Deligero	Shaina Magdayao, Rocky Salumbides, Natileigh Sitoy	Best Director; Best Editing; Best Actor (Rocky Salumbides); Best Supporting Actress (Natileigh Sitoy)
Si Magdalola at Ang Mga Gago	Jules Katanyag	Peewee O'Hara, Ricky Davao, Rhen Escaño, Josh Bulot, Gio Gahol	Special Jury Prize
Every Room is a Planet	Malay Javier	Rap Fernandez, Valeen Montenegro, Antoinette Taus	
Malinak Ya Labi	Jose Abdel Langit	Angeline Quinto, Allen Dizon, Althea Vega, Marcus Madrigal, Menggie Cobarrubias, Dexter Doria, Richard Quan, Luz Fernandez	Best Screenplay (Jose Abdel Langit)
Tisay	Borgy Torre	JC De Vera, Nathalie Hart, Joel Torre	Champion Bughaw Award; Best Music (Francis de Veyra); Best Production Design (Michael Español)

== 2017 Cinema One Originals Film Festival ==
The film festival ran from November 13 to 28, 2017. There are nine films in competition for this year, which had the tagline "Walang takot!" The competition also opened itself to documentaries.

=== Documentary Feature Category ===
Title	Director	Awards
Bundok Banahaw, Sacred and Profane	Dempster Samarista	Best Documentary
Haunted: A Last Visit to the Red House	Phyllis Grande	

=== Narrative Feature Category ===
Title	Director	Cast	Awards
Changing Partners	Dan Villegas	Agot Isidro, Anna Luna, Jojit Lorenzo, Sandino Martin	Audience Choice Award; Champion Bughaw Award; Best Actor (Jojit Lorenzo); Best Actress (Agot Isidro); Best Director (Dan Villegas); Best Acting Ensemble; Best Music (Vincent de Jesus); Best Editing (Marya Ignacio)
Si Chedeng at Si Apple	Fatrick Tabada & Rae Red	Gloria Diaz, Elizabeth Oropesa	Best Supporting Actress (Mae Paner); Special Jury Mention
Nervous Translation	Shireen Seno	Jana Agoncillo, Sid Lucero	Best Sound (Leeroy New)
Paki	Giancarlo Abrahan	Dexter Doria, Shamaine Buencamino, Ricky Davao, Noel Trinidad, Eula Valdes, Ina Feleo	Best Picture; Best Director (Giancarlo Abrahan); Best Supporting Actor (Ricky Davao); Best Screenplay (Giancarlo Abrahan)
Historiographika Errata	Richard Somes	Joem Bascon, Alex Medina, Nathalie Hart, Max Eigenmann, Jess Mendoza, Rafa Siguion-Reyna, Jett Pangan, Basti Artadi, Kean Cipriano, Dong Abay, Kevin Roy, Sarah Abad, Alvin Anson, Paolo Paraiso, Chickoy Pura, Robert Javier, Manu Respall	Jury Prize; Best Cinematography (Alex Esparted); Best Production Design (Donald Camon and Julius Somes)
Throwback Today	Joseph Teoxon	Carlo Aquino, Empress Schuck, Annicka Dolonius, Allan Paule, Benj Manalo, Kat Galang	
Nay	Kip Oebanda	Sylvia Sanchez, Enchong Dee, Jameson Blake	

== 2018 Cinema One Originals Film Festival ==
The film festival ran from October 12 to 21, 2018. There are nine films in competition for this year, which had the tagline "I Am Original", encompassing the theme of what it truly means to be human. The competition also opened itself to short films.

=== Narrative Feature Category ===
Title	Director	Cast	Awards
A Short History of a Few Bad Things	Keith Deligero	Victor Neri, Jay Gonzaga	Special Citation
Asuang	Raynier Brizuela	Alwyn Uytingco, Jon Lucas, Chai Fonacier, Nats Sitoy, Jun Sabayton	Best Actor (Alwin Uytingco)
Bagyong Bheverlynn	Charliebebs Gohetia	Rufa Mae Quinto	
Double Twisting Double Back	Joseph Abello	Joem Bascon, Tony Labrusca	
Hospicio	Bobby Bonifacio	Loisa Andalio, Mary Joy Apostol, Ana Abad Santos	Best Supporting Actress (Mary Joy Apostol)
Mamu; and A Mother Too	Rod Singh	Iyah Mina, Arron Villaflor, EJ Jallorina	Audience Choice Award; Best Actress (Iyah Mina); Best Supporting Actor (Arron Villaflor)
Never Tear Us Apart	Whammy Alcazaren	Ricky Davao, Meryll Soriano, Jasmine Curtis-Smith	Jury Prize; Best Director (Whammy Alcazaren); Best Cinematography (Sasha Palomares); Best Production Design (Thesa Tang); Best Editing (Ilsa Malsi); Best Music (Erwin Romulo)*
Paglisan	Carl Joseph Papa	Ian Veneracion, Eula Valdes	Champion Bughaw Award; Best Picture; Best Screenplay (Carl Papa and Aica Ganhinhin); Best Music (Teresa Barrozo)*; Best Sound (Jess Carlos)
Pang MMK	John Lapus	Neil Coleta, Nikki Valdez, Joel Torre, Ricky Davao, Cherry Pie Picache	

- * Never Tear Us Apart and Paglisan were tied in the said award.

== 2019 Cinema One Originals Film Festival ==
The film festival ran from November 7 to 17, 2019. There are eight films in this year competition, which had the tagline "I Am Original, Kaya Mo?".

Best Short Film

- Sa Among Agwat by Don Senoc

Student Film Award

- Kapasidad by Tyrone James Luanzon

=== Narrative Feature Category ===
Title	Director	Cast	Awards
Lucid	Natts Jadaone, Victor Villanueva and Dan Villegas	Alessandra De Rossi, JM de Guzman	Best Actress (Alessandra De Rossi); Best Musical Score (Emerzon Texon)*; Best Editing (Benjamin Tolentino)
Metamorphosis	J.E. Tiglao	Gold Aceron, Ivan Padilla, Iana Bernardez, Yayo Aguila, Ricky Davao	Best Director (J.E. Tiglao); Best Actor (Gold Aceron); Best Supporting Actress (Iana Bernardez); Best Cinematography (Tey Clamor)**; Best Sound (Immanuel Verona and Vince Banta)
O	Kevin Dayrit	Anna Luna, Jasmine Curtis-Smith, Lauren Young, Sarah Carlos, IV of Spades	Best Musical Score (Kevin Dayrit)*
Sila Sila	Giancarlo Abrahan	Gio Gahol, Topper Fabregas	Audience Choice Award; Best Film; Best Supporting Actor (Topper Fabregas); Best Screenplay (Daniel Saniana)
Tayo Muna Habang Hindi Pa Tayo	Denise O’Hara	JC Santos, Jane Oineza	
Tia Madre	Eve Baswel	Jana Agoncillo, Cherie Gil	Best Cinematography (Carlos Mauricio)**
Utopia	Dustin Celestino	Joem Bascon, Enzo Pineda, Arron Villaflor, Karen Toyoshima	Special Jury Prize; Best Production Design (Eero Yves Francisco)
Yours Truly, Shirley	Nigel Santos	Rayt Carreon, Dennis Padilla, Regine Velasquez	

- * Lucid and O were tied from the Best Musical Score
- ** Metamorphosis and Tia Madre were tied from Best Cinematography
