= Carl Joseph Papa =

Filipino filmmaker and animator

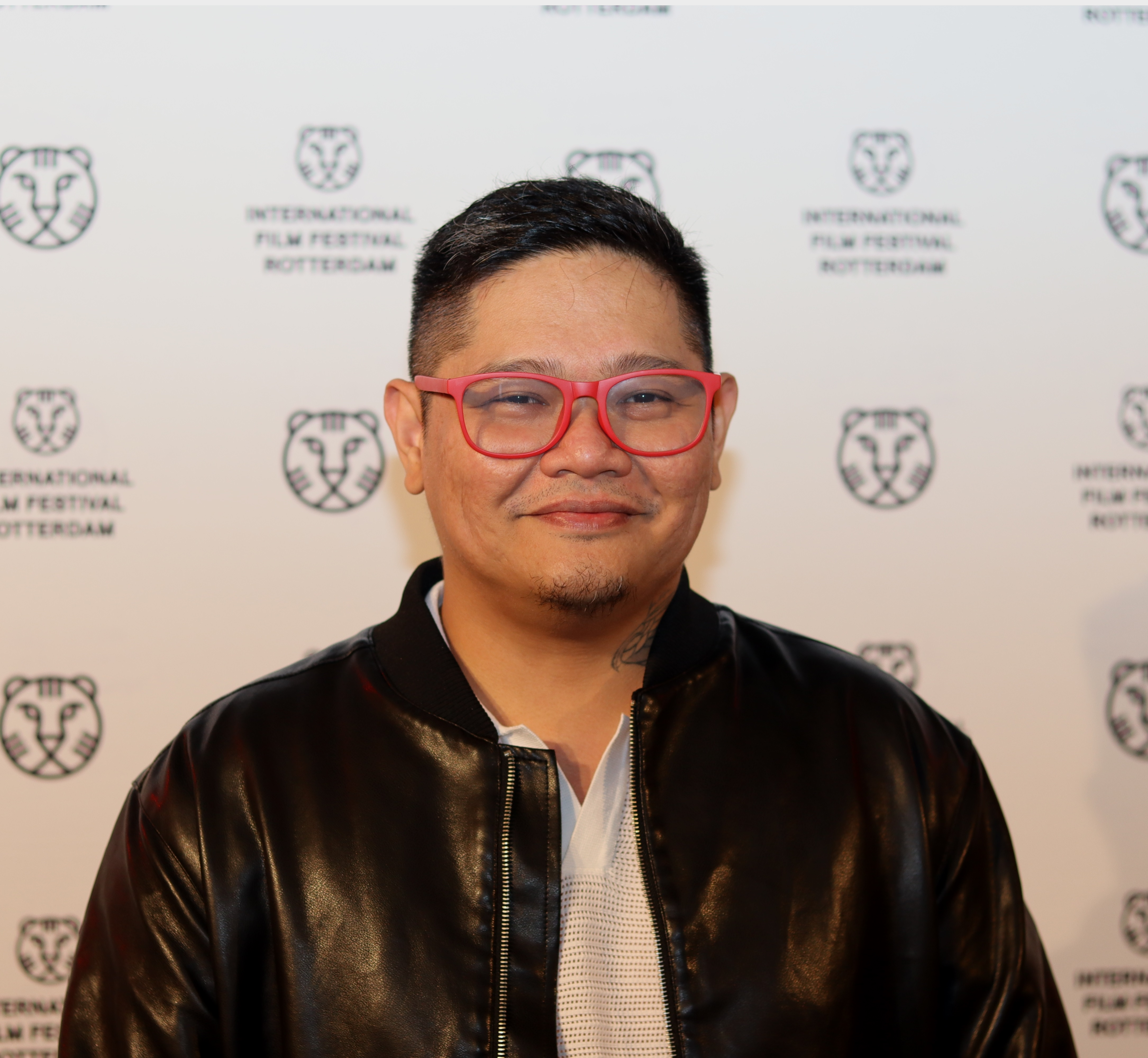
- Carl Joseph Papa at the IFFR 2026
- Born: Carl Joseph Echague Papa; Metro Manila, Philippines
- Education: UP Diliman
- Occupations: Film director; screenwriter; animator
- Years active: 2012–present

Carl Joseph E. Papa is a Filipino filmmaker and animator. His films employ rotoscoping and unique animation techniques to explore the country's social and personal conflicts.

His animated films have been screened at film festivals, and pioneered top honors during his lifetime including black tragicomedy Manang Biring (2015) and musical comedy-drama Paglisan (2018), both of which won him Best Film twice at Cinema One Originals Film Festival, and psychological drama science-fiction Iti Mapukpukaw (2023), won the Best Film at the 19th Cinemalaya Independent Film Festival. His recent film, 58th, was premiered at the International Film Festival Rotterdam.

== Career ==
=== 2012–2014 ===
Originally intended as a software engineer when he was an alumnus of University of the Philippines and pursue his career as a Java consultant at Orange and Bronze Software Labs, Papa took filmmaking instead to develop cutout animated short films Ang Prinsesa, ang Prinsipe at si Marlborita (2012) and iNay (2013).

He made his directorial debut live action film, the semi-autobiographical experimental drama The Unforgetting (2014), about a young woman's struggle to preserve happy memories and forgetting painful ones when her mother left. The film was screened at QCinema International Film Festival.

=== 2015–present ===
He gained local recognition for his adult animated films: Manang Biring, which won him the Best Film at the 2015 Cinema One Originals, the first animated film to do so, and Paglisan, which won him another Best Film at the 2018 Cinema One Originals. Iti Mapukpukaw garnered several awards, including Best Film at the 19th Cinemalaya Independent Film Festival and 47th Gawad Urian Awards, the first animated film to do so, and immense media attention for his submission as the Philippine entry for the Best International Feature Film category at the 96th Academy Awards, the first animated film to be submitted by the Philippines.

In his recent film, 58th, describes as a documentary about the Maguindanao massacre that took place in 2009. The film portrays Glaiza de Castro as Ma. Reynafe Momay-Castillo, a daughter of the disappeared photojournalist Reynaldo "Bebot" Momay, alongside Ricky Davao, Mikoy Morales, Biboy Ramirez, Marco Masa, and Zyren Dela Cruz are announced to be part of the cast line-up; it was Davao's last acting film prior to his death in May 2, 2025.

In addition of directorial films, he is writing several live-action comedy films including Asuang (2018), Mang Jose (2021), and Boys at the Back (2024).

=== Upcoming projects ===
He is currently working on his animated film, Sentinel, set in a high school consumed by dark secrets.

== Style and themes ==
With the exception of The Unforgetting and Homecoming, Papa's directorial films are entirely animated with different types of animation: cutout, child art, and rotoscoping. Each films have recorded in live-action or voice recording with storyboard process during pre-production before the animation process in post-production. Additionally, most directorial films have notable, well-known cast members including Cherry Pie Picache, Ian Veneracion, Eula Valdez, Khalil Ramos, Carlo Aquino, and Dolly de Leon.

Papa's films explore social and personal conflicts that reflected the country's daily lives, most often including abandonment (The Unforgetting), cancer and death (Manang Biring), dementia and depression (Paglisan), incest and child sexual abuse (Iti Mapukpukaw), political corruption (58th), rape (The Next 24 Hours), and teenage pregnancy (iNay).

== Filmography ==
=== Feature films ===
Year	English title	Original title	Director	Writer	Editor	Notes	Ref.
2014	The Unforgetting	Ang ‘Di Paglimot Ng Mga Ala-Ala	Yes	Yes	No	Directorial debut; also producer	
2015	Old Woman Biring	Manang Biring	Yes	Yes	Yes	Also animator; Actor: Dream Nurse	
2018	The Leaving	Paglisan	Yes	Yes	Yes	Also animation compositor and lyricist ("Hari ng kwento", "Buhay teatro", "Pagod na", "Ten Past Eleven"); Actor: Doctor	
2018	Asuang		No	Yes	No		
2021	Mang Jose		No	Yes	No		
2023	The Missing	Iti Mapukpukaw	Yes	Yes	No	Also animation director, compositor, and flashback storyboard artist; Submitted for the Best International Feature Film category at the 96th Academy Awards	
2024	Boys at the Back		No	Yes	No	Also story by	
2026	58th		Yes	Yes	No	Also animation director	
TBA	Sentinel		Yes	Yes	No		

=== Short films ===
Year	English title	Original title	Director	Writer	Editor	Notes	Ref.
2012	The Princess, the Prince and Marlborita	Ang Prinsesa, ang Prinsipe at si Marlborita	Yes	Yes	Yes	Also producer, animator, cinematographer, and production designer	
2013	Homecoming	Ti Panagawid	Yes	No	Yes	Also producer and cinematographer	
2013	Mother	iNay	Yes	Yes	Yes	Also producer, animator, cinematographer, and production designer	
2017	Love Bites		Yes	Yes	Yes	Also production designer	
2025	The Next 24 Hours		Yes	Yes	Yes		

=== Television series ===
Year	English title	Original title	Director	Writer	Editor	Notes	Ref.
2021	Puto		No	Yes	No	2 episodes	

== Awards ==
=== Asia Pacific Screen Awards ===
1 win out of 2 nominations
Year	Category	Nominated work	Result	Ref.
2016	Best Animated Film	Manang Biring	Nominated	
2024	Best Animated Film	Iti Mapukpukaw	Won	

=== FAMAS Awards ===
1 win out of 5 nominations
Year	Category	Nominated work	Result	Ref.
2019	Best Original Screenplay	Asuang	Nominated	
2019	Best Original Song	Paglisan	Won	
2024	Best Director	Iti Mapukpukaw	Nominated	
2024	Best Screenplay	Iti Mapukpukaw	Nominated	
2024	Best Visual Effects	Iti Mapukpukaw	Nominated	

=== Gawad Urian Awards ===
1 win out of 4 nominations
Year	Category	Nominated work	Result	Ref.
2019	Pinakamahusay na Direksyon (Best Director)	Paglisan	Nominated	
2024	Pinakamahusay na Direksyon (Best Director)	Iti Mapukpukaw	Nominated	
2024	Pinakamahusay na Dulang Pampelikula (Best Screenplay)	Iti Mapukpukaw	Nominated	
2024	Pinakamahusay na Animasyon (Best Animation)	Iti Mapukpukaw	Won	

=== Film festivals awards ===
13 (including runner-up) wins out of 23 nominations
Film festival	Year	Category	Nominated work	Result	Ref.
Animahenasyon: The Philippine Animation Festival	2018	Grand Winner	Love Bites	Won	
Animahenasyon: The Philippine Animation Festival	2018	Best Storytelling	Love Bites	Won	
Animahenasyon: The Philippine Animation Festival	2018	Best in Technical	Love Bites	Won	
Animahenasyon: The Philippine Animation Festival	2018	Best Production Design	Love Bites	Won	
Annecy International Animation Film Festival	2024	Contrechamp Grand Prix	Iti Mapukpukaw	Nominated	
Cinema One Originals Film Festival	2015	Best Film	Manang Biring	Won	
Cinema One Originals Film Festival	2015	Best Director	Manang Biring	Nominated	
Cinema One Originals Film Festival	2015	Best Screenplay	Manang Biring	Nominated	
Cinema One Originals Film Festival	2015	Best Editing	Manang Biring	Nominated	
Cinema One Originals Film Festival	2015	Audience Award	Manang Biring	Nominated	
Cinema One Originals Film Festival	2015	Champion Bughaw Award	Manang Biring	Won	
Cinema One Originals Film Festival	2019	Best Film	Paglisan	Won	
Cinema One Originals Film Festival	2019	Best Director	Paglisan	Nominated	
Cinema One Originals Film Festival	2019	Best Screenplay	Paglisan	Won	
Cinema One Originals Film Festival	2019	Best Editing	Paglisan	Nominated	
Cinemanila International Film Festival	2012	Young Cinema Competition – Best Short Film)	Ang Prinsesa, ang Prinsipe at si Marlborita	Won	
Cinemanila International Film Festival	2013	Young Cinema Competition – Best Short Film)	Ti Panagawid	Nominated	
Cinemalaya Philippine Independent Film Festival	2023	Best Film	Iti Mapukpukaw	Won	
Cinemalaya Philippine Independent Film Festival	2023	NETPAC Full-length Feature Award	Iti Mapukpukaw	Won	
Fantasia International Film Festival	2024	Satoshi Kon Award for Achievement in Animation – Special Jury Mention (Best Animated Feature)	Iti Mapukpukaw	Won	
Fantasia International Film Festival	2024	Audience Awards – Best Animated Feature	Iti Mapukpukaw	Silver	
Osaka Asian Film Festival	2024	Grand Prix	Iti Mapukpukaw	Nominated	
Palm Springs International Film Festival	2024	FIPRESCI Prize for Best Foreign Language Film	Iti Mapukpukaw	Nominated	

== See also ==
- Cinema of the Philippines
- Filipino cartoon and animation
- Independent animation
- Nonoy Marcelo - a Filipino pioneering animation filmmaker.
- Richard Linklater - an American filmmaker linked to his rotoscoping animated films.
