= Manang Biring =

- Directed by: Carl Joseph Papa
- Written by: Carl Joseph Papa
- Starring: Erlinda Villalobos
- Cinematography: Rap Ramirez; Manuel Abanto
- Edited by: Carl Joseph Papa
- Music by: Dunno Parafina
- Animation by: Matthew Ericson Echague
- Color process: Black and white
- Production companies: Black Maria Pictures; Creative Programs Inc.
- Release date: November 9, 2015
- Running time: 87 minutes
- Country: Philippines
- Language: Filipino

Manang Biring (transl. Old Woman Biring) is a 2015 Philippine adult animated comedy-drama film directed by Carl Joseph Papa.

It is the first animated film in the Philippines to be developed entirely through rotoscoping. It draws several themes including old age, financial crisis, cancer, friendship, and family reunion.

== Premise ==
The story revolves around Manang Biring, an elderly woman who has stage 4 breast cancer, who receives a letter from an article about the reunion. Even as she has accepted her fate, she wants to spend time with her family and is still looking forward to reuniting with her grandson and estranged daughter for the Christmas season until her death.

== Cast ==
- Erlinda Villalobos as Biring
- Mailes Kanapi as Eva, a friend of Biring
- Alchris Galura as Terence, a friend of Biring.
- Patrick Sugui as Yohan
- Bea Benedicto as Amanda
- Lance Raymundo as Richard Abadilla
- Cherry Pie Picache as Nita, as Biring's daughter
- Carlo Tan as CJ

== Production ==
Manang Biring was produced under Black Maria Pictures. with Carl Joseph Papa as the director, writer and editor. Rap Ramirez and Manuel Abanto were the cinematographers while Matthew Ericson Echague was the lead animator. Dunno Parafina did the music.

Manang Biring was done in black and white animation and had Filipino as its dialogue. It was first filmed in live action and later processed into rotoscope animation.

== Release ==
Manang Biring is the sole animation entry at the 2015 Cinema One Originals, a film festival which started on November 9, 2015.

It would be screened in film festivals outside the Philippines such as the 2016 Annecy Animation Film Festival and the 2016 Nara International Film Festival.

=== Accolades ===
3 wins out of 9 nominationsAccolades received by Broken Heart's Trip
Award	Date of ceremony	Category	Recipient(s)	Result	Ref.
11th Cinema One Originals	November 2015	Best Film	Manang Biring	Won	
11th Cinema One Originals	November 2015	Best Director	Carl Joseph Papa	Nominated	
11th Cinema One Originals	November 2015	Best Actress	Erlinda Villalobos	Nominated	
11th Cinema One Originals	November 2015	Best Supporting Actress	Mailes Kanapi	Nominated	
11th Cinema One Originals	November 2015	Best Screenplay	Carl Joseph Papa	Nominated	
11th Cinema One Originals	November 2015	Best Editing	Carl Joseph Papa	Nominated	
11th Cinema One Originals	November 2015	Best Music	Dinno Parafina	Won	
11th Cinema One Originals	November 2015	Audience Award	Manang Biring	Nominated	
11th Cinema One Originals	November 2015	Champion Bughaw Award	Manang Biring	Won	

== See also ==
- Adult animation in the Philippines
