= List of Philippine animated films =

The following are a list of Philippine animated films. Included are works which is in-full or partially produced by a production studio or entity based in the Philippines.

This excludes:

- Live action films that happens to heavily uses computer-generated imagery (CGI). Unless such works had to be described by reliable sources such works in whole as live-action animation (e.g. Saving Sally).
- Films produced by international studios which were subcontracted to Philippine-based firms (outsourced) or just happens to have individual Filipinos among its production team.
- Documentary films that have partial use of animation.

== Feature films ==
=== Completed ===
Release date	Title	Director(s)	Studio (Note: Local or Philippine-based unless otherwise stated)	Technique	Synopsis	Ref.
09/21/1978	Tadhana (Note: An adult-oriented animated production) (transl. "Fate")	Nonoy Marcelo	—N/a	Traditional	Based on volumes of novels of the same name by Ferdinand Marcos, a commissioned film portrays a satirical, humorous and poignant view of the Philippines' history of Spanish colonization through highly original and surreal vignettes fusing art, mythology and music.	
1979	Biag ni Lam-ang (Note: Considered lost) (transl. "The Life of Lam-ang")	Nonoy Marcelo	—N/a	Traditional	Based on Philippine folk epic of the same name, the film depicts the adventures and misadventures of the Ilocano epic hero, Lam-ang.	
1989	Sa Paligid-ligid (transl. "Everywhere")	—N/a	Philippine Children's Television Foundation	Traditional	The film about the environmental awareness and conservation.	
12/25/1995	Isko: Adventures in Animasia	Mike Relon Makiling; Geraldo A. Garccia	OctoArts Films	Hybrid	A coconut dealer must save the princess and the land of Animasia from the evil monsters.	
12/25/1997	Adarna: The Mythical Bird	Geraldo A. Garccia	FLT Films International; Guiding Light Productions	Traditional	After the king falls ill, three sons set out on a journey to look for the Adarna Bird, a magical creature who could cure their father but could also turn people into stone if they fall asleep to its song.	
10/09/2002	Kwentong Kayumanggi (transl. "Stories from the Malay Race")	Nelson B. Caliguia, Sr.	ArtFarm Asia Animation	Traditional	A triptych animated film based on myths and legends from each of the country's major island groups.	
06/18/2008	Urduja	Reggie Entienza	APT Entertainment Seventoon; Imaginary Friends Studio; Road N Trip	Traditional	A fictionalized tale of an Asian folk heroine and warrior princess Urduja of Pangasinan with the ability and willingness to defend her people from their rival tribe.	
12/25/2008	Dayo: Sa Mundo ng Elementalia (transl. "Niko: The Journey to Magika")	Robert Quilao	Glasshouse Graphics Logo; Cutting Edge Productions; Red Giant Media	Traditional	A preteen named Bubuy who has to save his grandparents who were abducted and brought to the strange land called Elementalia, home to a host of strange creatures from Philippine mythology.	
12/25/2010	RPG Metanoia	Luis C. Suarez	Ambient Media; Star Cinema Productions; Thaumatrope Animation	CGI	A preteen named Nico leads a simple life except when he logs onto a role-playing game in which he transforms into a hero in his own little online world until one day, it is invaded by a destructive virus that threatens the real world too.	
07/10/2011	Kapitan Torpe (transl. "Captain Clumsy")	Antonio Cadiz	Bata Animation and Video Productions	Flash	A reluctant superhero called Kapitan Torpe realizes it is easier to be brave in the face of oppression than it is in the face of true love as he is thrust deeper and deeper into the world of crime fighting.	
02/26/2014	Pikyaw (transl. "Peacock")	Arnold Fuentes	Multimedia Arts & Graphics Ensemble (MAGE), Inc.	Flash / Traditional	A student thesis film about a group of children: Abet, Tyrone, and Marco who finds themselves in a parallel universe that is the subject of revenge by Albion, a creature who lived in Calixto since he was a child.	
11/09/2015	Manang Biring	Carl Joseph Papa	Black Maria Pictures; Creative Programs Inc.	Rotoscoping	Manang Biring, an elderly woman who has Stage T4 Breast cancer, wants to spend time with her family and is still looking forward to reuniting with her estranged daughter for the Christmas season until her death.	
12/25/2016	Saving Sally	Avid Liongoren	Rocketsheep Studio; Solar Pictures	Hybrid	Marty, an amateur comic book artist who falls in love for Sally, a gadget inventor, and has since become her loyal protector and hero from the monsters.	
10/12/2018	Paglisan (transl. "The Leaving")	Carl Joseph Papa	Black Maria Pictures	Traditional	The relationship of a middle-aged couple strained as the man develops dementia.	
10/15/2019	Cleaners	Glenn Barit	Dambuhala Productions; Point Bee Multimedia; Wapak Sound Studios; Quantum Films; plan.c; Quezon City Film Development Commission; Oktopus Productions	Pixilation	Set in the backdrop of a Catholic school in Tuguegarao City, a coming-of-age film about high school cleaners for the school year 2007-2008.	
10/29/2020	Hayop Ka! (transl. "You Animal!")	Avid Liongoren	Rocketsheep Studio; Spring Films	Flash	Nimfa, an anthropomorphic feline who works as a perfume saleswoman and whose boyfriend, a mongrel named Roger, is employed as a janitor. When Nimfa meets Iñigo, a wealthy dog with a career as a high-profile entrepreneur, she finds herself in the middle of a love triangle.	
08/05/2023	Iti Mapukpukaw (transl. "The Missing")	Carl Joseph Papa	Project 8 Projects; GMA News and Public Affairs; GMA Pictures; Terminal Six Post	Traditional / Rotoscoping	Eric, an animator without a mouth prompted by his mother to visit his uncle, which leads to the return of an alien he encountered in childhood intent on taking him away from Earth.	

=== Upcoming ===
Films that are under production.

Release date	Title	Director(s)	Studio	Technique	Synopsis	Ref.
2025	Zsazsa Zaturnnah vs the Amazonistas of Planet X	Avid Liongoren	Rocketsheep Studio; Ghost City	Traditional	Based on a komik of the same name by Carlo Vergara, Ada is a shy, gay hairdresser in a small town, encounters a magical meteorite from outer space that gives him the ability of turning into a flamboyant female superhero under his identity Zsazsa Zaturnnah.	
September 23, 2026	Plump Blossom	Kap Rossana	Kapitana Entertainment Media	AI-assisted	Long time ago, where beauty was defined by fullness, the gentle Princess Ruo Hua—affectionately called Princess Plump Blossom—sets off on a transformative quest of bravery and truth. Her destiny changes when a mysterious commander crosses her path, forcing her to confront trials that challenge her resolve and spirit alike.	
2026	Ella Arcangel: Ballad of Tooth and Claw	Mervin Malonzo	Rocketsheep Studio; Twenty Manila; GMA Pictures	Traditional	A little girl from the slums of Manila battles supernatural entities in the midst of the government’s drug war making her question who the real monsters are.	
2026	Combatron: The Movie	TBA	Mavx Productions	CGI	Empoy, a young Filipino who inherits powerful alien battle armor from his dying father, the original Combatron, to defend Earth from alien invaders like the tyrannical Death Metal and his robot army, guided by his robot dog Askal.	
2026	58th	Carl Joseph Papa	GMA News and Public Affairs; GMA Pictures	Rotoscoping	The film will tell the story of the family of Bebot Momay, who was considered the 58th victim of the crime, although his body was never found.	
TBD	Ad Memoriam	Ria Lu	Leveret Group; Wayfarer Media	Traditional	When a rock band suddenly rises to game thanks to a series of deaths, an old detective races against time to save the singer from the clutches of her own demons, figuratively and literally.	
TBD	Afternoons with Lapu-Lapu	Marla Rausch	Kampilan Production; Animation Vertigo Asia; Puppeteer Studios	Traditional	The film involves a third-generation Fil-Am teen, Paula, who must care for her sick grandfather, who believes he is a descendant of the historical warrior Lapu-Lapu.	
TBD	Anito	John Aurthur Mercader	Puppeteer Studios	CGI	Anito is the story of a young boy named Aaren who falls into the mythological spirit world full of fantastical and vicious creatures of Filipino legends. He finds himself lost and haunted by these creatures as he struggles to find his way home.	
TBD	Ewa	Keith Sicat	Kino Arts	Traditional	In a future of intergalactic migrant workers, Ewa is an idealistic scientist forced to take a dangerous job in outer space to provide for your young son’s future. When she is marooned on a hostile world, she struggles to reconnect with her child who is lightyears away.	
TBD	Flan, Flan	Karla Circe Consolacion	Meowsmouse	Traditional	A tiny, rambunctious cat and her stalwart companions are on an epic adventure to defeat the Demon King and bring peace to the land of Fandania - but first they need to learn how to fight.	
TBD	Leader, Bored	Tobie Abad	Taktyl Studios	Traditional	Four unlikely friends leap into video game-inspired challenges each morning.	
TBD	Light Lost	Avid Liongoren	Rocketsheep Studio	Traditional	Based on a graphic novel by Rob Cham, Teardrop and Backpack are oddball friends who get separated across the universe.	
TBD	Rage Radio	Mark Mendoza	Friendly Foes	Anime-inspired	Rage Radio is about to close the concert when the major shift changed as a virtual radio station, but still not giving up and goes on a mission to stop the closure.	
TBD	Sentinel	Carl Joseph Papa	N/A	Rotoscoping	Set in a high school consumed by dark secrets.	
TBD	Steampunk Society	Tobie Abad	Taktyl Studios	CGI	Hughes Hector, boomer billionaire leader of the Steampulp Society, has never feared for the future until he is forced to team up with the younger and unpredictable digital native A.I. recruit, Itzel. Meanwhile, Sheba, an efficient X adventurer with no filter, is stuck in between them. They must find ways to work together and thwart the schemes of the mysterious Megalomind.	
TBD	Tales of Hasheesh	Mari Nicole Mendoza	Half Wolf Entertainment Inc.; Martinii Animation Studio	Traditional	The story follows a 20 year old French man on his journey from Paris to the Middle East, finding the best supplies for his father's struggling business.	
TBD	Yama: The Golden Lily	Mark Mendoza	Friendly Foes	Traditional	A boy named Roger on a search for a mysterious girl named Yama. Inspired by the Yamashita's Gold, The film is set in an alternate reality where remnants of a great war are scattered throughout the world, with each relic holding stories and secrets of a distant past.	
TBD	Untitled film	Ronnie del Carmen	—N/a	—N/a	—N/a	

== Short films ==
=== 1950s ===
1950-1959
Date	Title	Director(s)	Technique	Synopsis	Notes
1953	Untitled film (Note: Considered lost)	Larry Alcala	Traditional	An 8mm animated short film about the girl is jumping rope and boy is playing a yo-yo.	
1955	Juan Tamad (Note: Considered lost)	Francisco Reyes; José Zabala-Santos	Traditional	A commercialized advertisement for a cooking oil product.	
1961	Conversation in Space	Rodolfo Paras-Perez	Cutout / Oil-painting	A 2-minute direct film with vivid and captivating abstract animation that used with collage and paint.	

=== 1980s ===
1980-1989
Date	Title	Director(s)	Technique	Synopsis	Notes
1981	The Criminal	Fruto Corre; Emmanuel Dadivas	Traditional	A fugitive who cannot escape from himself.	
1982	Hari (transl. "King")	Mike Alcazaren; Juan Alcazaren	Stop-motion	The short film revolves around the power struggle of several characters fighting over the ownership of a crow.	
1983	Headset	Monlee; Roxlee	Traditional	A comical tale of a man wearing a headphone that produces rock music in his ears.	
1983	Huling Trip (transl. "Last Trip")	Mike Alcazaren; Juan Alcazaren	Stop-motion	A forward look into the radioactive age when survival comes down to eating one another.	
1984	Anino (transl. "Shadow")	Claire Salaveria	Traditional	The story of an artist living the life of a shadow inside a box told with charcoal drawings.	
1984	Pagpula (transl. "Becoming Red")	Mike Alcazaren; Juan Alcazaren	Stop-motion	The short film commented social and political issues during the Marcos era.	
1984	The Eye in the Sky	Joey Agbayani; Roby Agbayani	Hybrid (Stop-motion)	A boy looks into a magical microscope and discovers a world of strange creatures. Upon seeing the boy’s huge eye, the creatures begin to worship him. An ambitious evil emperor oppresses and forces the other creatures to build a tower so that he can get hold of the eye.	
1984	The Great Smoke	Monlee; Roxlee	Hybrid (Traditional)	A satirical approach to the effects of nuclear war on the human race.	
1985	ABCD	Monlee; Roxlee	Traditional	An advocation for a new and personal take on the alphabet reveals multi-layered, comical meanings, an experimental animation decidedly crude in approach and part socio-political commentary and surrealist whimsy.	
1989	Nguyamyam	Josephine Atienza; Jojo Topacio	Stop-motion	An educational short film teaches children what would happen to their planet if inhabitants devour all their precious resources and did not take care of their environment.	
1989	Spit	Mike Alcazaren; Juan Alcazaren	Stop-motion and traditional	A character spitting with his saliva then changing into different forms and interacting with different characters.	

=== 1990s ===
1990-1999
Date	Title	Director(s)	Technique	Synopsis	Notes
1993	Anak Maynila (transl. "Child of Manila")	Emmanuel Dadivas; Dange Desembrana	Hybrid (Traditional)	A short film about an impoverished mother and child roaming the streets of the metro.	
1993	Noli Me Tangere (transl. "Touch Me Not")	Manny Aldana; Geraldo A. Garccia	Traditional	An animated short drama film based on a book of the same name by Jose Rizal.	
1994	Melvin & Mekka	Jojo Paniza	Traditional	A boy named Melvin learns to love Mekka, an unwanted cat, after the animal saves him from choking.	
1995	Junkzilla	Emmanuel Dadivas	Stop-motion	A family witnesses the transformation of their garbage into a monster.	
1995	Mokmok	Living Room Productions	Traditional	—N/a	
1996	Alamat ng Ibong Adarna	Animasia Studios	Traditional	—N/a	
1996	Ano ang Trabaho ng Nanay Mo? (transl. "What Does Your Mother Do?")	Tita Rosel	Cutout	A child’s perspective on the most overlooked superhero of the home - mother.	
1996	The Friendly Letter	Katrina Blanch Villa	Cutout / Traditional	A short film is about the "friendly letter" is what you send when you don't care to send the very best.	
1996	The Last Fish in the World	Tina Basco; Patricia Sim	Cutout	People around the world try doing bizarre things to have fish and in the end, the last fish decides to leave them.	
1996	Vexations	Mike Alcazaren; Juan Alcazaren	Traditional	—N/a	
1997	Doon sa Kabila ng Bulkan	Ellen Ramos	Traditional	—N/a	
1997	The Ghostwriter	Joey Agbayani	Traditional	A talented ghost has just finished a literary masterpiece. Unfortunately, an ambitious vampire, Count Roach, sneaks into his haunted house and steals his work. In order to recover his masterpiece, the ghost confronts the vampire and battles with him using his wit, imagination and talent.	
1998	Puti (transl. "White")	Melvin S. Calingo	Traditional	A figure single-mindedly tries to paint everything in white until it encounters its own shadow.	

=== 2000s ===
2000-2009
Date	Title	Director(s)	Technique	Synopsis	Notes
2000	Blind Beauty	Melvin S. Calingo	Stop-motion	A stop-motion animation about one woman's vanity. Beauty truly is in the eye of the beholder.	
2002	Fiesta Karera	Ervin Malicdem	CGI		
2005	Fly Aswang	Mark Galvez	Traditional		
2007	Araw At Gabi	Nelson B. Caliguia, Sr.	Traditional		
2007	Doodle of Doom	Nelson B. Caliguia, Sr.	Traditional		
2008	Love and Marriage	Kenny Lyn Tai	Traditional		
2009	Mutya	Nelson B. Caliguia, Sr.	Traditional		

=== 2010s ===
2010-2019
Date	Title	Director(s)	Technique	Synopsis	Notes
2010	When Alma Died	Wesley Tan	Traditional		
2010	Robuboy & Pugita	Avid Liongoren	Traditional		
2010	Smog	Jerome Alcordo	Cutout		
2011	Killing Just Becomes A Habit	Gil Joseph A. Sanchez	Traditional		
2011	Song Of The Magi	Jerome Alcordo; Ionone Bangcas	Traditional		
2011	Sulundon	Jerome Alcordo; Ionone Bangcas	Traditional		
2011	Trapo	Jerome Alcordo; Ionone Bangcas	Traditional		
2012	Ang Prinsesa, ang Prinsipe at si Marlborita	Carl Joseph Papa	Cutout		
2012	Reversion	Giancarlo Ng	CGI		
2012	Bus Stop	Jerome Alcordo; Ionone Bangcas	Traditional		
2012	Kaleh & Mbaki	Dennis E. Sebastian	CGI		
2012	Marianing	Nikolo Salazar	Traditional		
2013	Bahay Kubo	Ellen Ramos	Traditional		
2013	iNay	Carl Joseph Papa	Cutout		
2014	An Maogmang Lugar	Mary Ann Espedido	CGI		
2014	Lakas ng Lahi	Arnold Arre	Traditional		
2015	Buttons	Jared Garcia; Marvel Obemio; Francis Ramirez	Traditional		
2015	GEO	Arthur Merceder	CGI		
2015	Muning	Avid Liongoren	Traditional		
2016	Josephine	Avid Liongoren	Traditional		
2016	Momo	Avid Liongoren	Traditional		
2016	Passage of Life	Renz Vincemark Cruz; Hanna Gayapa	Traditional		
2016	Strings	Rafael Daniel Evangelista V	CGI		
2017	Love Bites	Carl Joseph Papa	Stop-motion		
2018	Tahanan	Demetrio E. Celestino III	Stop-motion	The film centers on issue of family separation told through the lens of a young green sea turtle	First stop-motion animated film to be screened at the Student Short Film competition of the 2018 Metro Manila Film Festival.
2019	Jepoy	Avid Liongoren	Traditional		
2019	Our Forgotten Friends	Avid Liongoren	Traditional		

=== 2020s ===
2020-2029
Date	Title	Director(s)	Technique	Synopsis	Notes
2020	Ella Arcangel: Lullaby in the Dark	Mervin Malonzo	Traditional		
2020	Lea's Secret	Rico Gutierrez	Traditional	Based on the 2007 children's book of the same name by Augie Rivera, the film's plot tackles child sexual abuse through the eyes of a young girl with her own "superpowers".	
2021	Bebot	Mark Mendoza	Traditional		
2022	Bad Tourism	Mark Mendoza	Traditional		
2023	Commute	Mark Mendoza	Traditional		
2024	Aiayai	Mark Mendoza	Traditional		
2024	Ili Ili	Clister Santos	CGI	A pregnant mother, unsure of how to raise a child, arranges an interview with her two gay dads but fate intervenes when his dad suffers a heart attack. Her dad reflects on their family's history, captured on an old camcorder.	
2024	Kampana	Mark Mendoza	Traditional		Won the Grand Prize in Animahenasyon 2024’s Professional Division.
2024	Sulayman	Nelson B. Caliguia, Jr.	Traditional	The film revolves around the sacrifices heroes make to save others as the titular warrior uses his skills, compassion and dedication to fight elements that disrupt the peace in his hometown	Won the Best Animated Film at the PENSACON Short Film Festival 2024 and Best Animation (Traditional) at the FantaSci Short Film Festival.

=== Cancelled ===
Title	Director(s)	Technique	Synopsis	Notes
Division of Existence	Dave Gadrinab	3DCG anime	Set in the year 2030 where humanity discovered another world inhabited by paranormal beings such as demons. A military organization called Global Security was established to prevent these paranormal entities from entering the human world who also built a nine-leveled underground containment prison facility to detain paranormal entities.	The film is potentially scheduled to be released on December 2017 through YouTube, but it was left cancelled or unfinished.
