= Philippine animation =

Philippine animation, also known as Pinoy animation or Filipino animation, has a strong history of animation in Southeast Asia introduced between the early 1950s and the 1960s. The animation provided into the medium including films, television commercials and series, and video games.

It came out the very first animated short film was a pencil-and-paper animation shot in 8 mm film developed komiks illustrator and cartoonist Lauro "Larry" Alcala. The early years of Philippine animation were mainly commercial advertising in the mid-1950s and later re-established as an art form started in 1961. Painter Rodolfo Paras-Perez and cartoonists José Zabala-Santos and Francisco Reyes are considered the first pioneers of Philippine animation in mid-20th century.

Following the establishment of 1972 martial law under Ferdinand Marcos, the animation emerged a turning point to the entertainment industry, which led to the creation of the 1978 animated feature film Tadhana, emerge a new period started in the 1980s known as the Golden Age of Philippine Animation. Geraldo "Geirry" A. Garccia, Severino "Nonoy" Marcelo, and Roxlee were among the second pioneers of Philippine animation in the midst of Marcos and post-Marcos era.

Upon its creation of a new period under Philippine New Wave, animated features became reluctant among the major film studios in the 2000s–largely due to string of box-office disappointments in favor of live-action romance and comedy films–however, animated short films remained widely popular in film festivals, most notably the newly established Animahenasyon, as well as animated television series and commercials from the major networks.

Since the mid-2010s, Philippine animation saw its resurgences after the releases of Carl Joseph Papa's animated features Manang Biring and Paglisan, both were released on Cinema One Original Film Festival and won awards, shifted to more adult-oriented themes influenced by complex, mature storytelling with local issues and evolving cultural norms.

== Overview ==
Philippine animation is a body of original, cultural, and artistic works and applied to conventional Philippine storytelling. Using both talent and the application of classic animation principles, methods, and techniques, this reflects and recognizes their relationship with culture and comics in the Philippines.

It delves into the traditional Filipino "sense of going about things" or manner of coping with Filipino's daily life and environment that allows to manifest through the settings, characters, and overall mood of the animation.

The use of culture in the Philippines manifests through its narration and portrayal of the daily experiences of the Filipino people and objects that we usually see. It also features different elements in storytelling of Filipino mythology and folklore. Though some of them are not able to overtly show the sense of being a Filipino in their stories, which were successful in showing their values that we all uphold.

== History ==
=== 1940s–1965: Origins ===
An excerpt of an opening title of Conversation in Space (1961), claimed to be the oldest surviving Philippine animated work; the rest remained unknown or lost.

In 1946, Antonio Velasquez, father of Philippine comics, said in an attempt that he was paid to write a script for an animated feature film based on his famous character Kenkoy, but the project was abandoned.

In 1953, Philippine animation did actually came out the very first animation was Lauro "Larry" Alcala, did a short black-and-white animation on 8mm film of a girl doing jumping rope and a boy playing with a yo-yo.

In 1955, Philippine animation started with cartoonists who converted some folklore characters and their komiks into animated shorts. For example, José Zabala-Santos and Francisco Reyes produced Juan Tamad, a six-minute animated short film serves as an advertisement for Purico cooking oil, based on the famous Philippine folklore character of the same name. However, there was no certainty whether the film is believed to have never had a commercial run or took a PMC product shot in 35mm and processed in the United States had actually been presented as a commercial, resulted that the use of animation in the industry was introduced for commercial purposes to advertise consumer products began in the 1950s. For example, Alcala continued to produce animated shorts for television commercials of products such as Darigold Milk in 1957 and Caltex in 1965.

A non-narrative abstract and collage 16mm short film Conversation in Space (1961) by a UP-graduated painter Rodolfo Paras-Perez, considered one of the earliest animations and one of the earliest experimental films from the Philippines. These animations expand audience's perspectives of Southeast Asian modern and contemporary art. The film was screened at the first Asean film festival in Manila on 1971 and, in retrospective, the National Gallery Singapore’s ‘Painting with Light,’ an annual festival of international films on art in 2018, making it the earliest animation short film in the Philippines to be rediscovered.

=== 1965–1986: Marcos period ===
"All were edited on pneumatic tapes, shot in 35mm. And I did five minute animated shorts—twelve of those. Ely Matawaran and other cartoonists worked with me. Before, I had taken an animation course in New York City. For two years, 1977-1978, NMPC was a security blanket (against arrest for doing critical Marcos cartoons in the press). I rented a house and I tapped all known animators, and we were commissioned to do animation in three months for NMPC."

— Marcelo said after he directed two animated films and an opening scene in Annie Batungbakal (1979).

During the Marcos period back in the inauguration of the tenth president, Philippine animation become one of the regime's tools for propaganda and patriotism. Later in early films have been introduced by Severino "Nonoy" Marcelo, a cartoonist who was hired by the government and worked in animation at the National Media Production Center beginning in 1977, collaborated with Imee Marcos and Zabala-Santos for directing a documentary film about Marcos going on a field trip to his hometown titled Da Real Makoy (1977) and adapting an animated feature titled Tadhana (1978), a commissioned work which originally conceived as a television pilot and took production in three months. Described the film as "an animated compendium of new Philippine art", it was based on a multivolume book of the same name by Ferdinand Marcos.

Opening scene which included an animated version of Hotdog band in Annie Batungbakal (1979).

Widely believed the Philippine's first foray into an animated feature film, Tadhana was premiered in Philippine television as a part of the anniversary of Martial Law in 1978. At one point, Marcelo was supposed to replay and scheduled Tadhana for a commercial theater release, but for some reasons, unclear it was never seen again due to the said film was not released commercially on theaters for public viewing.

In 1979, The Adventures of Lam-Ang was produced by the same cartoonist Tadhana made, which was a one-hour animated feature based on the folklore of the same name. At the same year, Marcelo serves as animation director for a seven-minute opening scene in Nora Aunor's Annie Batungbakal.

Due to their immense interest to Filipinos that animation as a hub for subcontracted labor in the 1980s, aspiring animators, such as the Alcazaren brothers (consisting of Mike and Juan) and Roxlee, dominated to create their own experimental animated short films, much of their work have adult-oriented themes and political satire, until the People Power Revolution in 1986.

=== 1986–1990s: Television period ===
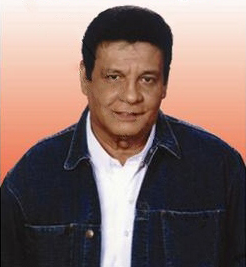
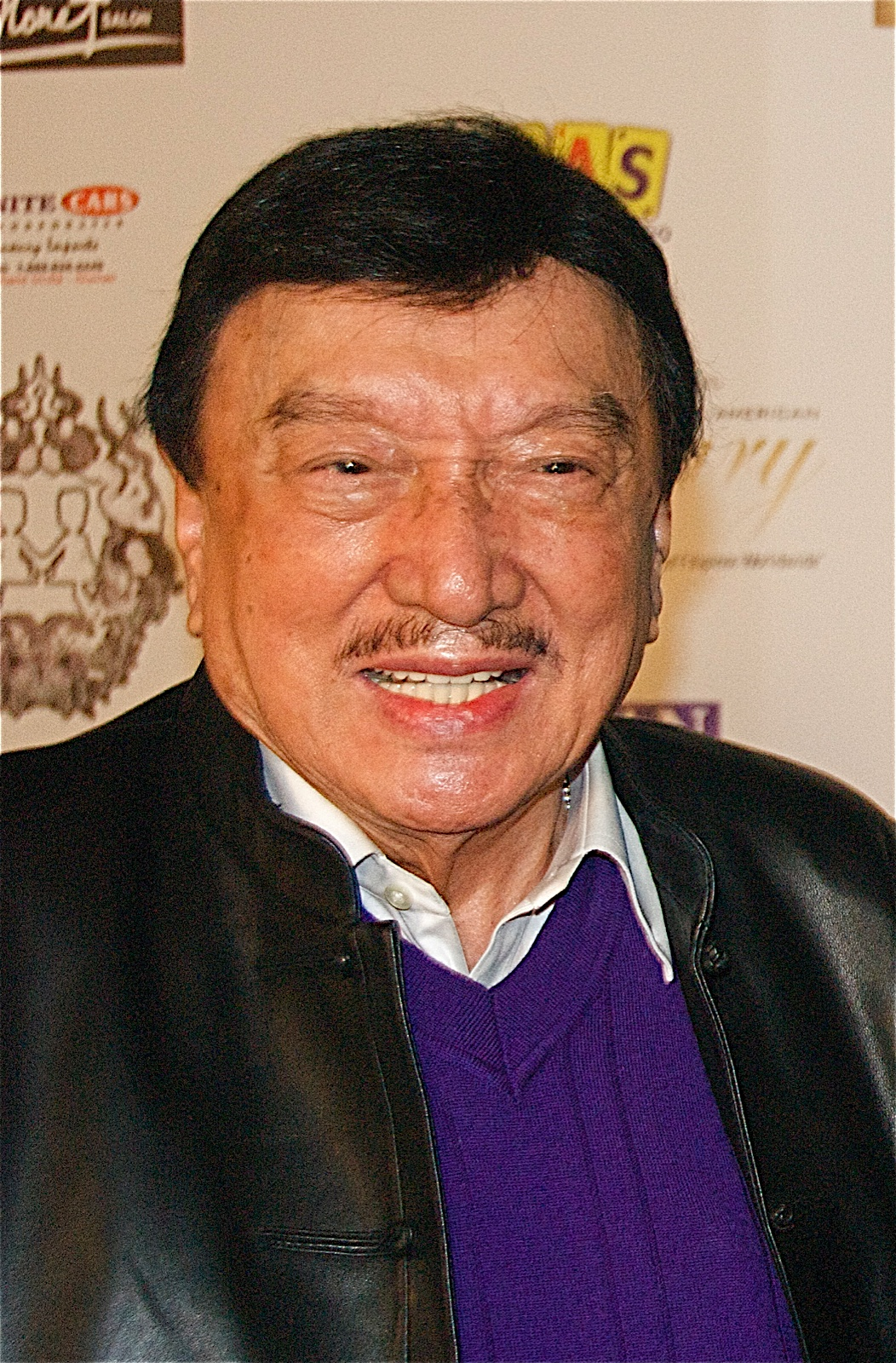
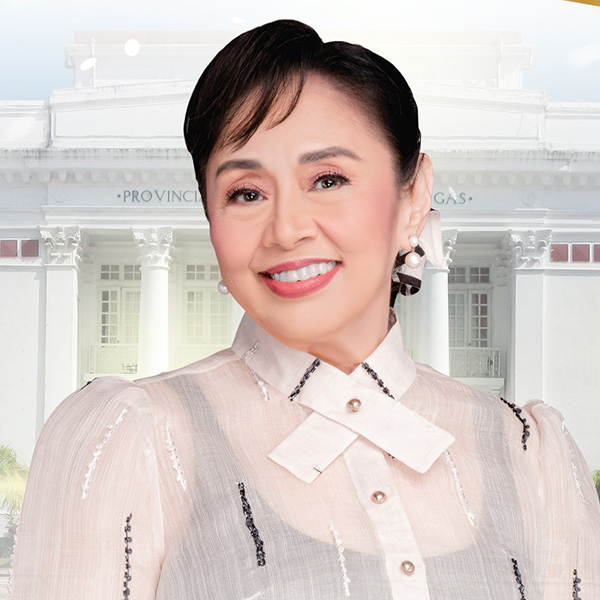
These three animated series were known for famous actors including Fernando Poe Jr., Dolphy, and Vilma Santos; all reprised their main roles for the respective series.

The first Philippine animated television series was Ang Panday, created by Geraldo A. Garccia (credited as Geirry Garccia) in 1986, based on a comic book character of the same name produced by Carlo J. Caparas. RPN-9 began airing in November 1986. Although it was a consistent success, Ang Panday lasted only for six months due to the high cost of producing an animated feature or series.

The success of Ang Panday led to broadcasting two animated series in the following year: Captain Barbell, based on a komik superhero of the same name by Mars Ravelo and Jim Fernandez, aired on RPN, clashing with Garccia's Ang Panday for broadcasting competition; Darna, based on a komik superheroine of the same name by Mars Ravelo and Nestor Redondo, released by GMA Network.

In 1989, Sa Paligid-ligid is a two-hour educational animated television special about the environmental awareness and conservation produced by the Philippine Children's Television Foundation aired on IBC 13.

Began in the 1990s, topics of Philippine animation have been significantly shifted from an emphasis on satirical and historical events to everyday issues and identities that reflects their reality to Filipino people.

=== 1990s–early 2010s: Fluctuations ===
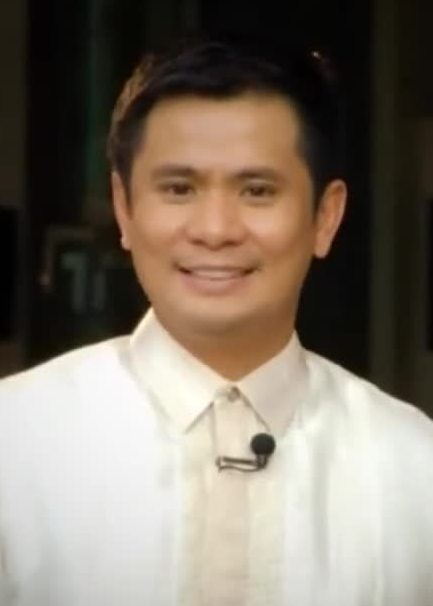
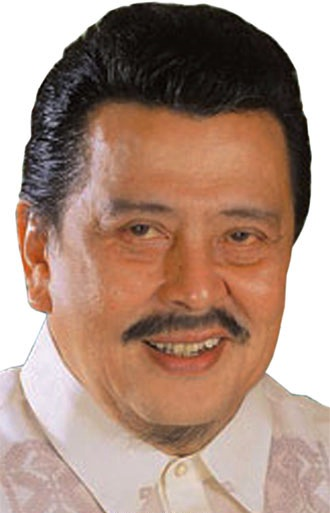
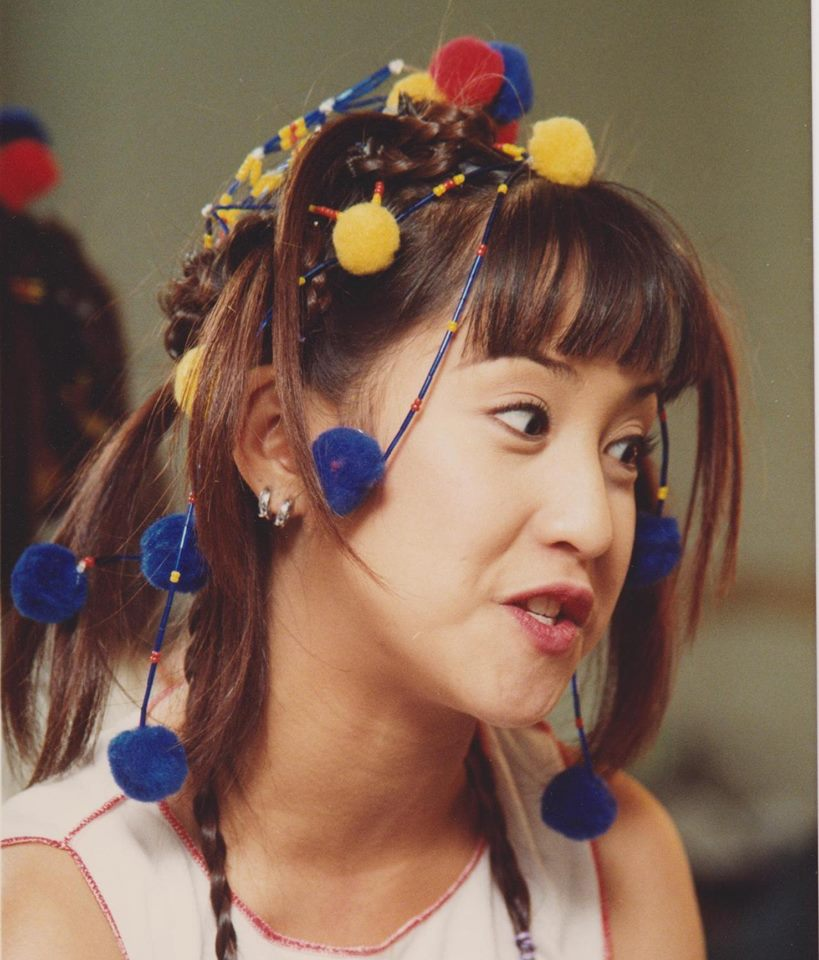
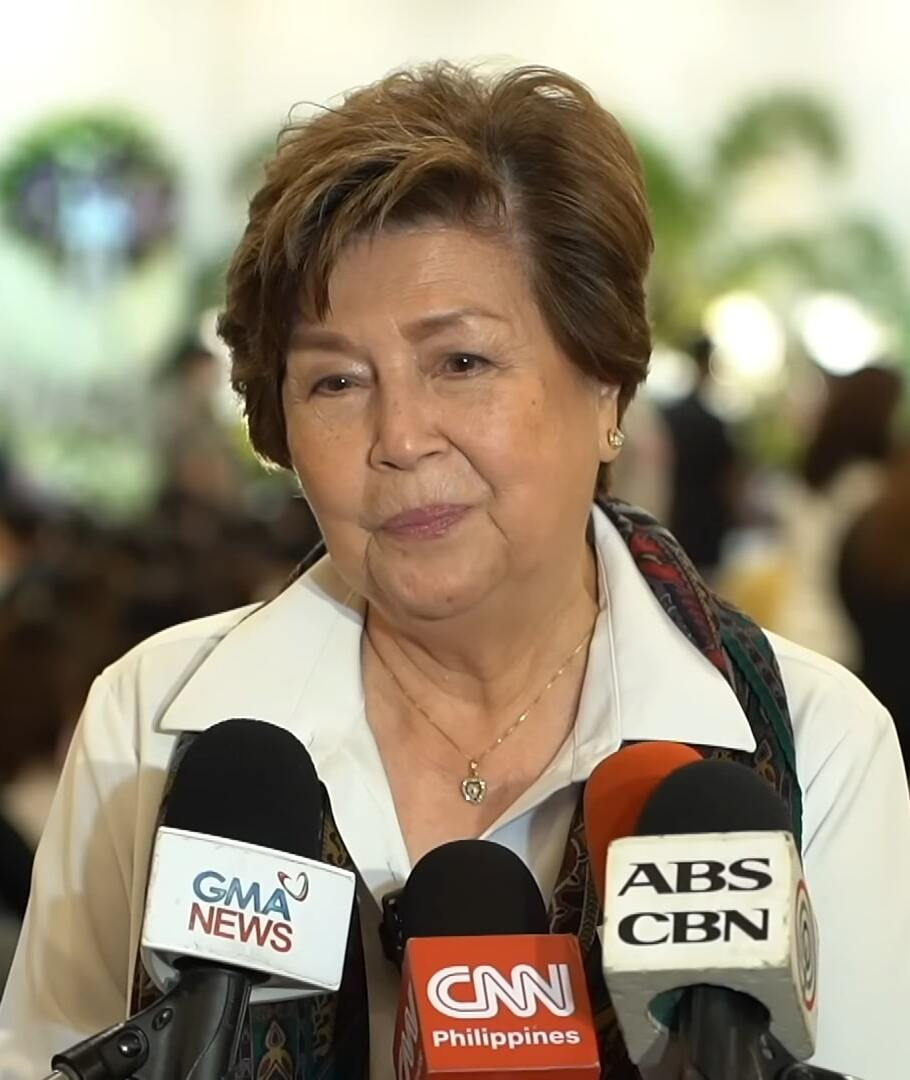
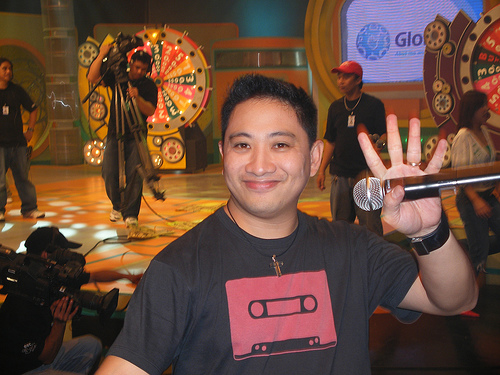
After Garcia's Ang Panday, some notable actors and actresses appeared in Garccia's filmography including Ogie Alcasid, Joseph Estrada, Jolina Magdangal, Boots Anson-Roa and Michael V.

In the 1990s, Garccia worked on several animated works including an animated short adaptation of Noli Me Tangere (1993), live-action animated hybrid Isko: Adventures in Animasia (1995) and a passion project Adarna: The Mythical Bird (1997), a fully-developed animated film debut based on the 19th century corrido commonly titled Ibong Adarna. Garccia, wrote the story and directed Adarna under FLT Productions and Guiding Light Productions, said he initially wanted to have the project as a TV series in 1997 but instead to a full-length film, and the film took two years to finish with roughly 300 animators and a new nine-minute segment soon added to the film that had the additional cost of ₱50,000, with producer Rose L. Flaminiano later bought the rights to the film's release when it was nearing completion. Adarna was declared an entry to the 1997 Metro Manila Film Festival (MMFF) on December 3, 1997, and received recognition from the Metro Manila Film Festival on December 27, 1997, as the "first ever animated movie in Philippine cinema" (Filipino: Kauna-unahang animated Movie sa Philippine Cinema), although predated by Marcelo's Tadhana. It earned a box office from MMFF worth ₱11.2 million, but did not make it to its production cost. Despite being a box-office bomb and some critics were critical of the film's poor animation, the Adarna's theatrical release and pioneering recognition was considered a highlight to Filipino animation. In 1998, it was also included in the Asian Collection of Japan's 7th Hiroshima Animation Festival.

Following Garccia's pioneering creations, an annual animation festival Animahenasyon was founded in 2007 and organized by the Animation Council of the Philippines, Inc. (ACPI), serves as a flagship project to Filipino newcomers and animators in showcasing their original ideas. Several animated short films and music videos premiere at the festival have been made over the years.

In 2007, Garccia produced the very first animated talk show on Philippine television entitled Talk Toons. Guest celebrities appeared in the series like Vilma Santos, Mikey Arroyo, German Moreno and former president Joseph Estrada. All were interviewed on video and transferred into animation.

At the same year, a Filipino-American satirical animated series created by Ramon Lopez and Jesse Hernandez entitled The Nutshack. The series's premise revolves two distant cousins, Phil, from the San Francisco Bay Area, and Jack, from the Philippines, who live with their uncle, Tito Dick, in south-suburban Daly City. Co-produced by Koch Entertainment and ABS-CBN International, it has been in development since mid or late 2005 and was produced in Macromedia Flash throughout the series on a Windows XP model. The series was teased in 2006 on YouTube and possibly on television. It began airing on Myx TV, but the series was concluded in 2011 completing two seasons with sixteen episodes due to generally low-rated and critically derided, though it built a small cult following from its reputation in late 2016 based on remixes of its theme song on YouTube, which became an internet meme.

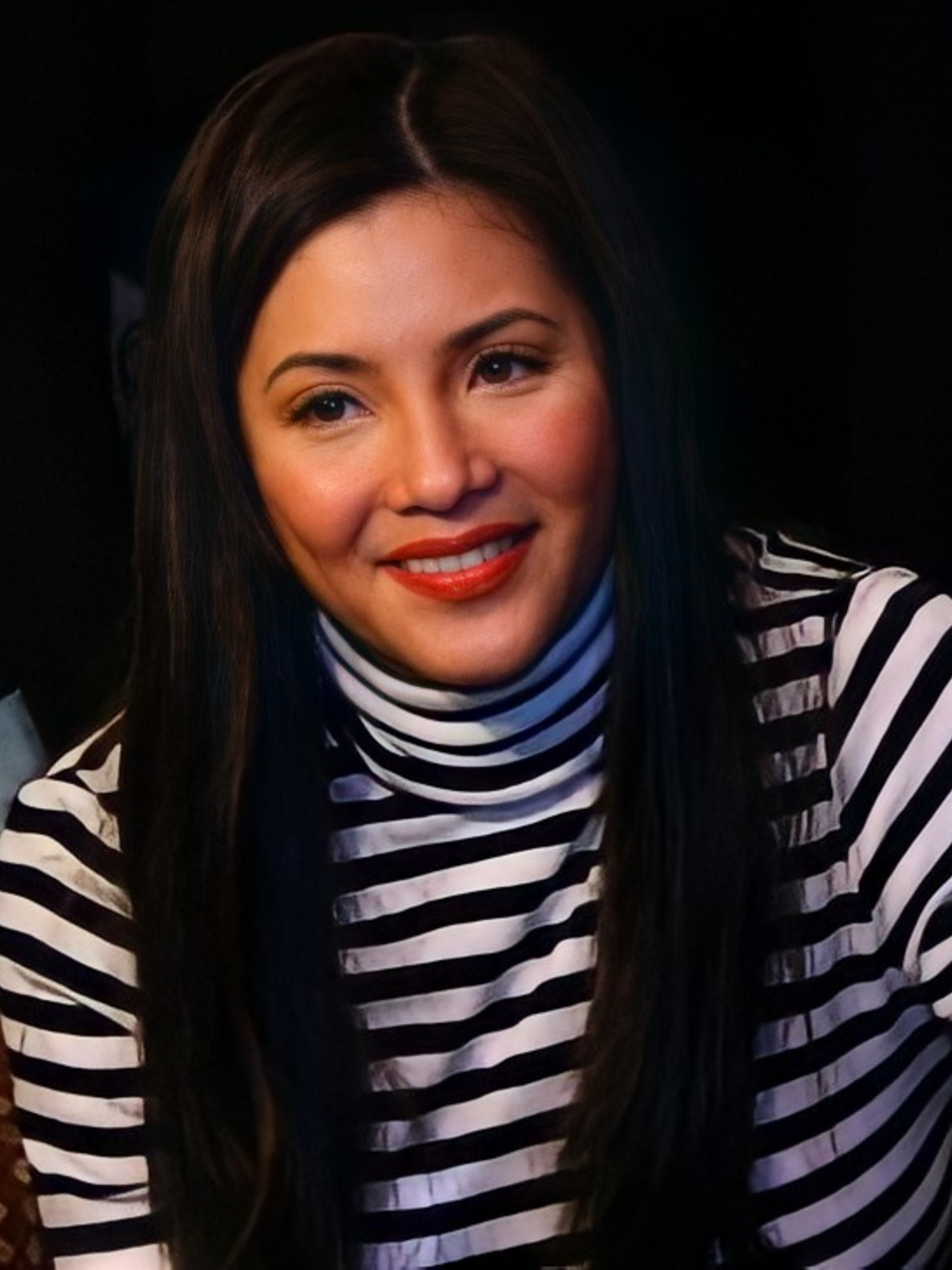
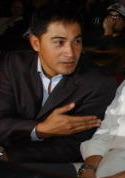
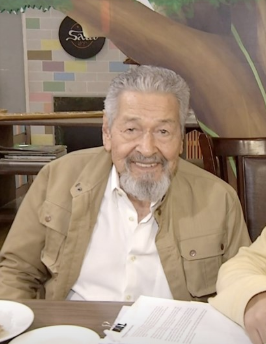
Regine Velasquez, Cesar Montano and Eddie Garcia appeared their main roles in Urduja.

In 2008, Garccia's creation was later followed by another theatrical animated film, Urduja, was top billed by Cesar Montano and Regine Velasquez as voices behind the lead characters, premiered in local theaters. Produced using a mixture of digital and traditional animation techniques, the film took eleven years of conceptualization or pre-production and was done roughly for two years of animation development by approximately 400-500 Filipino animators and three different animation studios situated within Luzon and Visayan areas, produced more than 120,000 drawings that ran in 1,922 scenes equivalent to 8,771 feet of film. The film earned ₱20 million during its premiere and gained a box office hit of roughly ₱31 million over unstated production cost, surpassing the milestone of Adarna's grossing release but still unsuccessful in getting the audience interest which resulted in loss of profit.

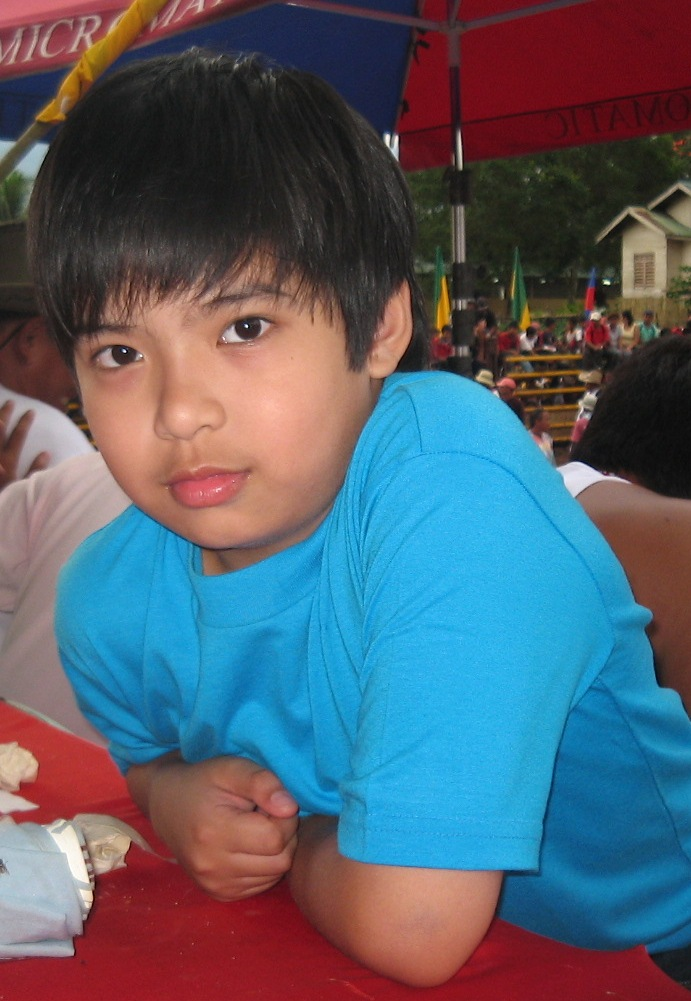
Child actor Nash Aguas in 2008.

Another full-length animated film was released in the same year, Dayo: Sa Mundo ng Elementalia. The film revolves around Bubuy (voiced by Nash Aguas) who is out to save his abducted grandparents in the land of Elementalia, a magical and mystical world that houses many of the mythical creatures of the Philippines and other enchanted elements.

Described as the Philippines' first all-digital full-length animated feature film, the film was done for two years of development composed of over 500 animators using paperless 2D (characters) and 3D (backdrops) technologies. The film graced the premiere as an entry to the 2008 Metro Manila Film Festival and gained a total of ₱5.6 million against its ₱58 million worth budget, but again was a box-office bomb.

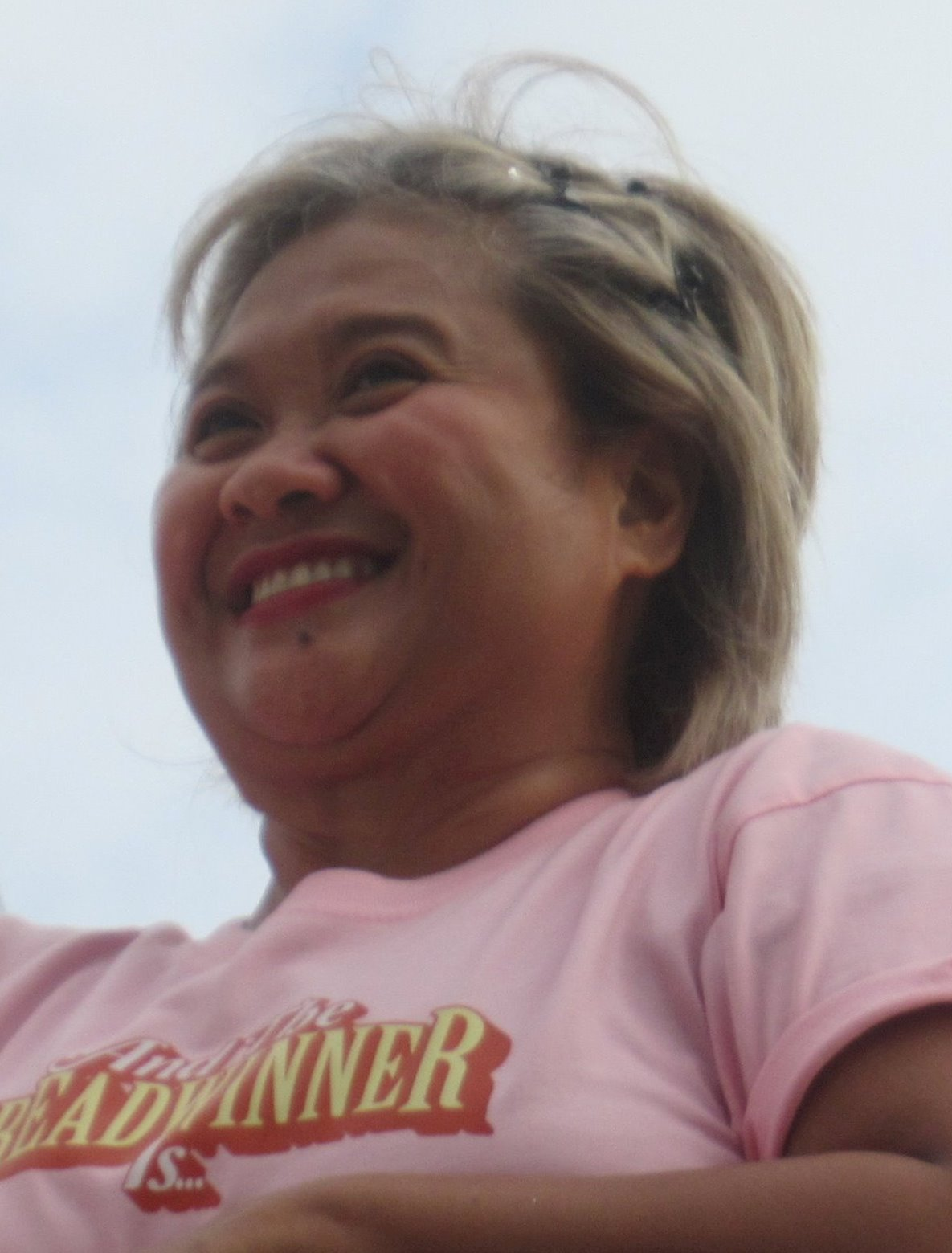
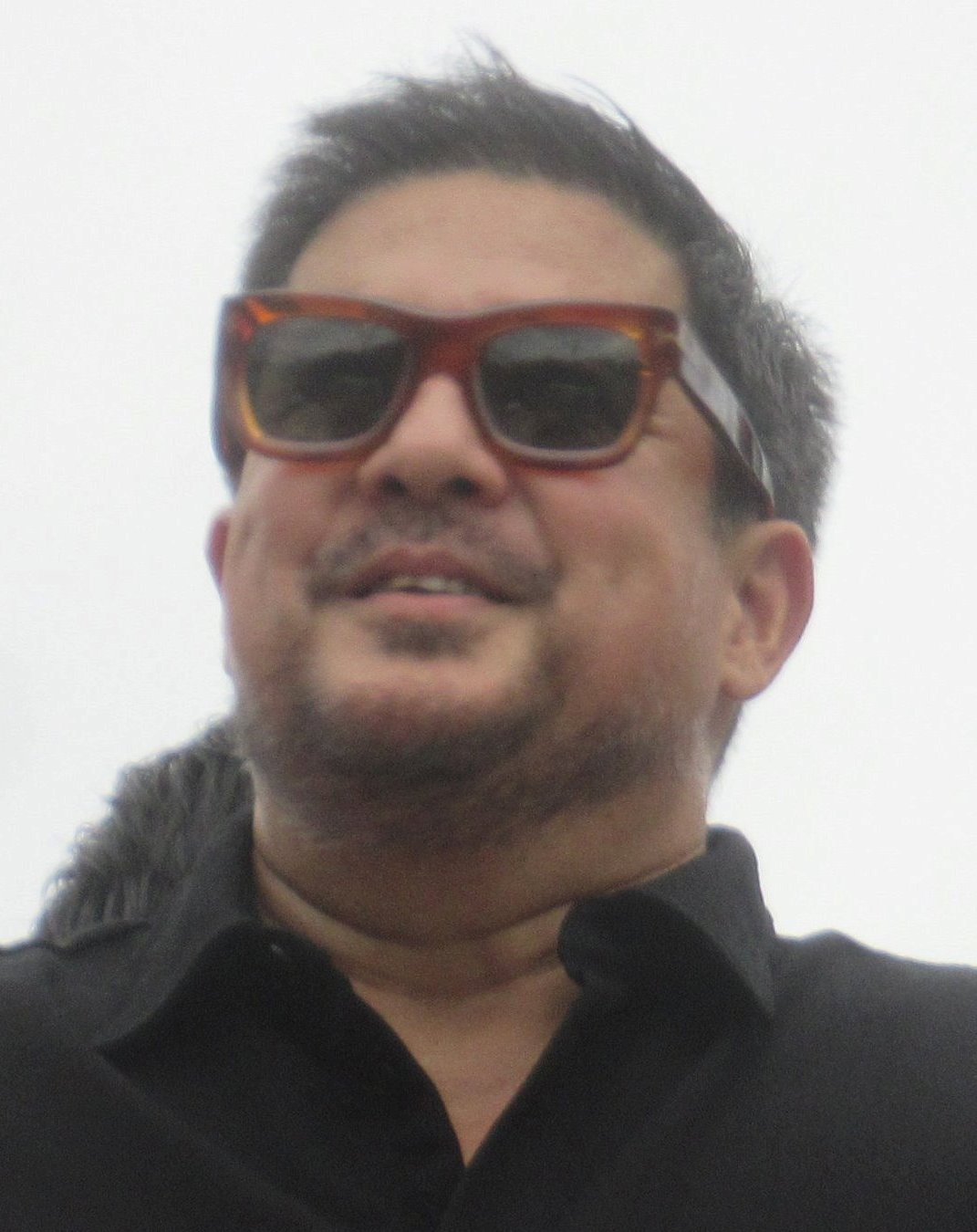
Star Cinema's regulars Eugene Domingo (left), Aga Muhlach (middle) and Vhong Navarro (right) appeared in RPG Metanoia.

In 2010, RPG Metanoia is the first feature-length theatrical animated film to be developed in computer-generated imagery with stereoscopic 3D, which took 5 years to make with less than a hundred animators, and AmbientMedia and Thaumatrope Animation serve as production companies for the film. The animation was done in full digital technology using 3D software for animation and 2D software for motion graphics and compositing, with Roadrunner Network, Inc did the stereoscope in the midst of post-production. RPG Metanoia was declared an entry and garnered three awards at the 2010 Metro Manila Film Festival, earn a total of ₱33 million for four-week release after MMFF premiere, a little higher than Urduja's ₱31 million, but was box-office disappointment over its production cost of ₱100 million.

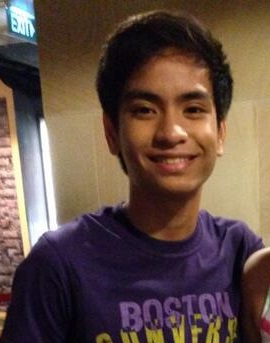
Jairus Aquino appeared in two animated works by ABS-CBN: Bryan in RPG Metanoia and Jomar in Super Inggo At Ang Super Tropa.

At the same year, an anime-inspired television series created by Enrico C. Santos entitled Super Inggo at ang Super Tropa, a spin-off of the television series Super Inggo. It is the first collaborative project between ABS-CBN TV, represented by business unit head and Vice President for TV Production Enrico Santos, and the newly formed ABS-CBN Animation Department, led by business unit head Guia Jose, who has trained at the Hanna-Barbera Studios in the United States during the 1980s. She explained that the series will run for two seasons, with each season tentatively containing 13 episodes that will approximately run for 22 minutes.

Kapitan Torpe, a now-defunct Flash-produced animated film about a reluctant superhero who fights crime and helps the oppressed. It was directed by Antonio Jose Cadiz and is the first and only feature-length film to be submitted at the Animahenasyon festival, which won him the Best Animation of Category D for full-length animated feature in 2010. This led to focus Animahenasyon on short films and commercials due to lack of producing feature-length films in the future which started in 2016.

Between the 2000s that the previous four animated films did not profit or break even with its production cost. This then resulted in a loss of interest in animation investors and the closure of local studios out of curiosity and respect towards animation in the Philippines due to in favor of internationally produced animation rivals and popularity clash towards the box office hit for Philippine cinema that favored romantic comedy films, Philippine animation has shifted to more artistically complex, narrative-driven experimental animated films to other independent studios in locals without further box-office release. However, animators still struggled to produce their originality due to the costly production and the decline in demand for animated films.

=== 2014–present: Independent and resurgence of animated features ===
In 2014, a student thesis film Pikyaw (2014) became the first animated film not only in Tagalog and Filipino languages, but fully voice performed in Hiligaynon. The film follows a group of children: Abet, Tyrone, and Marco who finds themselves in a parallel universe that is the subject of revenge by Albion, a creature who lived in Calixto since he was a child.

In 2015, Carl Joseph Papa's feature-length animated debut Manang Biring, a black tragicomedy about an old woman with a terminal cancer who wishes to spend time with her family in Christmas until her death. It was made history by the first animated film to be screened and won Best Picture at the Cinema One Original Film Festival.

Avid Liongoren's Saving Sally in MMFF release poster.

In 2016, Avid Liongoren's first feature film debut was live-action animated hybrid film entitled Saving Sally, first introduced in 2005 after the concept by Charlene Sawit in 2000, originally titled Monster Town as a short story. The film took twelve years to develop before was released in Philippine cinemas on Christmas Day as an official submission at the 2016 Metro Manila Film Festival, which received both commercial success and positive reviews from critics in the Philippines, the former went on to earn ₱27 million during the premiere.

In 2019, an experimental coming-of-age anthology animated film entitled Cleaners, follows a group of high school students assigned as end-of-day classroom cleaners and their experiences surrounding various school activities. Filmed entirely and digitally on a Sony A7S in live-action and shot in black-and-white, the film uses pixilation technique with several intrusions of colour through clothing and various objects, estimated 40,000 frames were printed, photocopied, selectively crumpled, and highlighted to indicate the protagonists before being digitally scanned for editing.

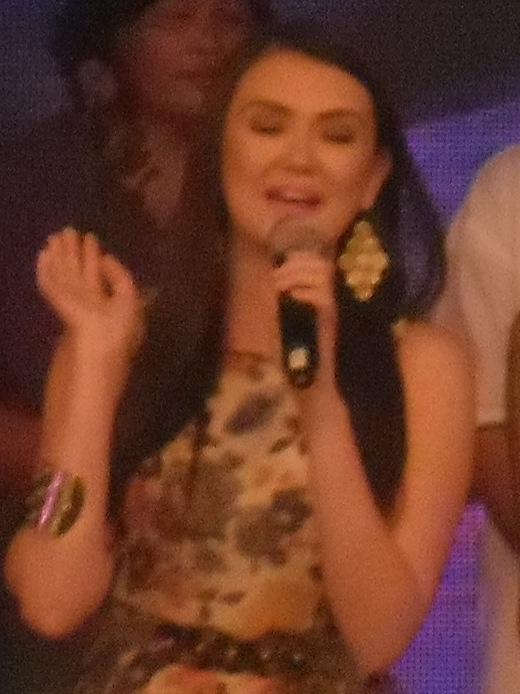
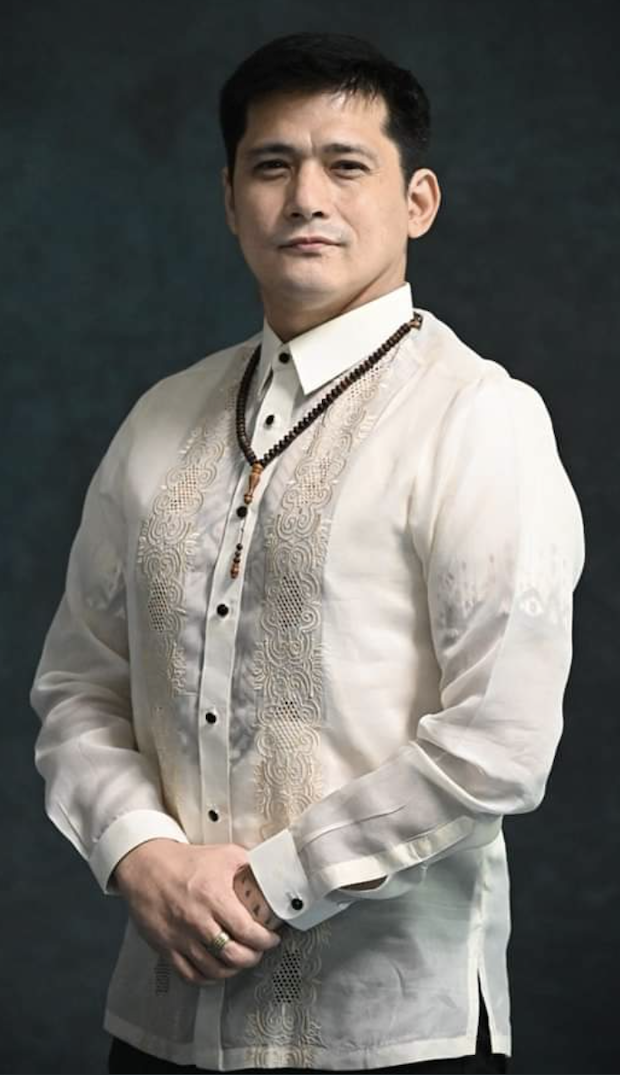
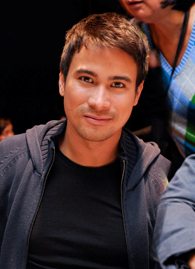
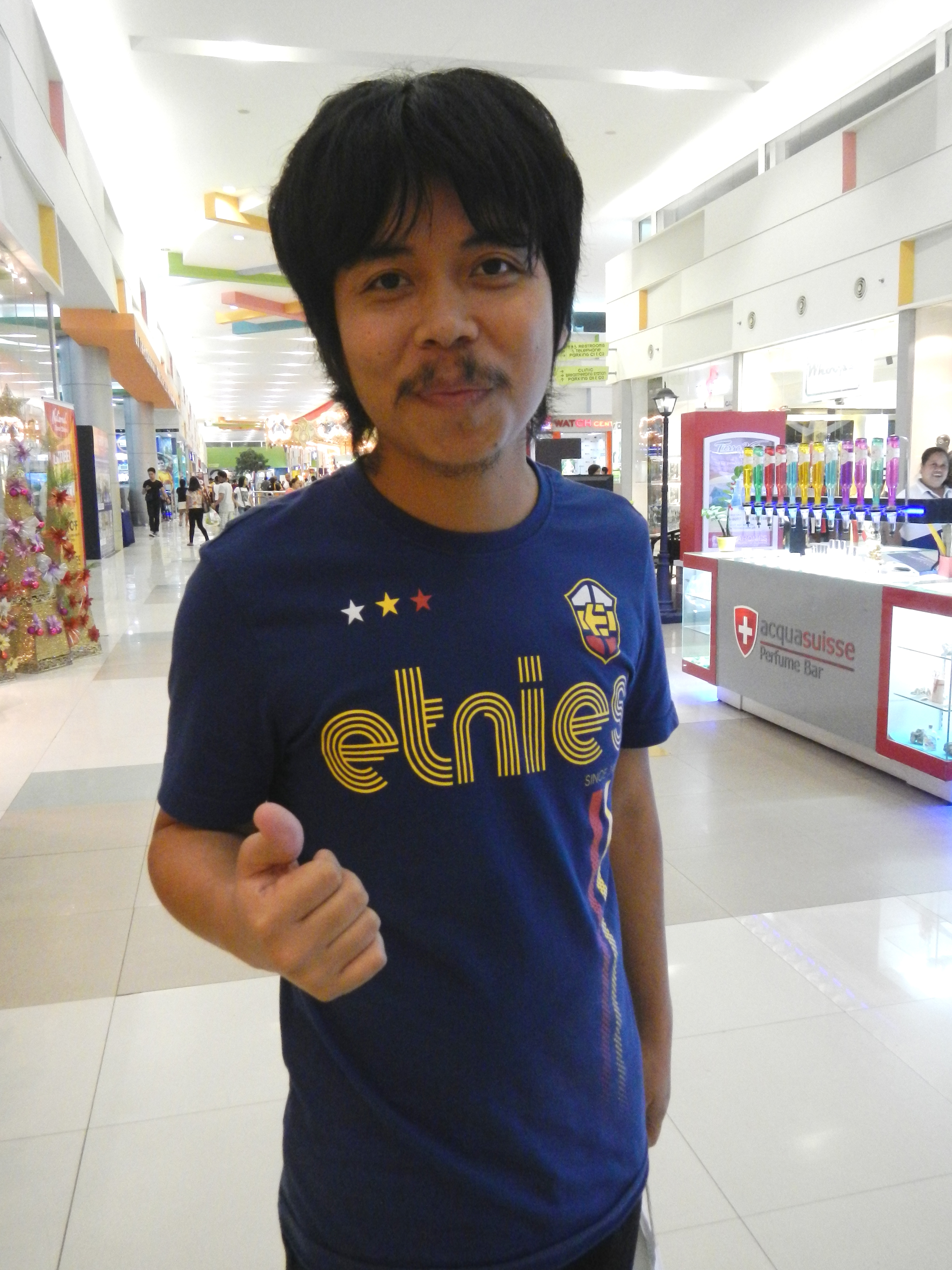
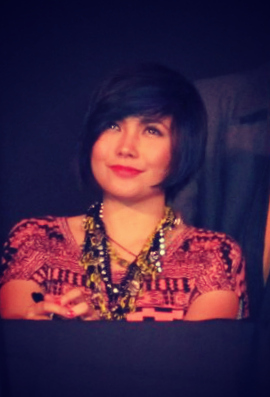
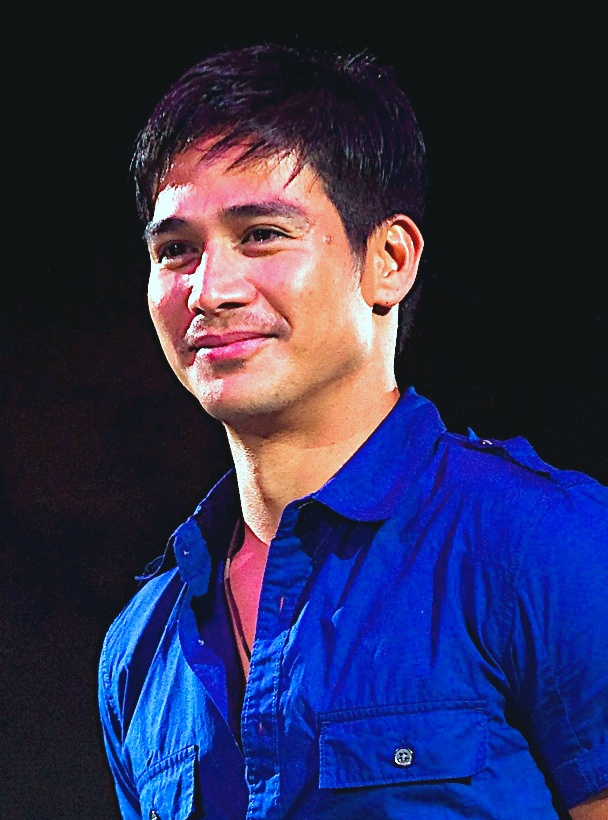
Ensemble casts of Hayop Ka! including the main characters of Angelica Panganiban, Robin Padilla and Sam Milby (top three), and the supporting characters of Empoy Marquez, Yeng Constantino and Piolo Pascual (bottom three).

In 2020, Liongoren's second feature film entitled Hayop Ka!, concepted after Saving Sally and took three years to produce. Originally as a telenovela-style soap-opera animated film during his prototype, he changed it as "light and comical" to aim for adults due to use of amount of profanity and sexual content like the previous film did. Liongoren stated the hope for creating a "Filipino style when it comes to cartoons" and noted that the Philippines has a huge animation industry "that does work for foreign projects." He also hoped it encourages "more local productions" and work for Pinoy animators. The film was distributed by Netflix to positive reviews and garnered seven nominations at the 44th Gawad Urian Awards including Best Film and Best Director, winning Best Animation, as well as six nominations at the 60th FAMAS Awards including Best Film and Best Director, winning Best Screenplay. It was nominated as an official selection for main competition at the 2021 Annecy International Animated Film Festival, the first Filipino animated feature film to be selected at the festival, although it lost to Academy Award-nominee Flee.

In 2021, Liongoren announced two animated projects based on works by respective authors: Zsazsa Zaturnnah Vs The Amazonistas Of Planet X, an adult animated superhero film based on a komik Zsazsa Zaturnnah by Carlo Vergara, where did it posted at Facebook, after originally pitched as a television series nor another live-action film but agreed to produce as an animated film with Vergara as a screenplay. Light Lost, a fantasy adventure based on the graphic novel of the same name by Rob Cham.

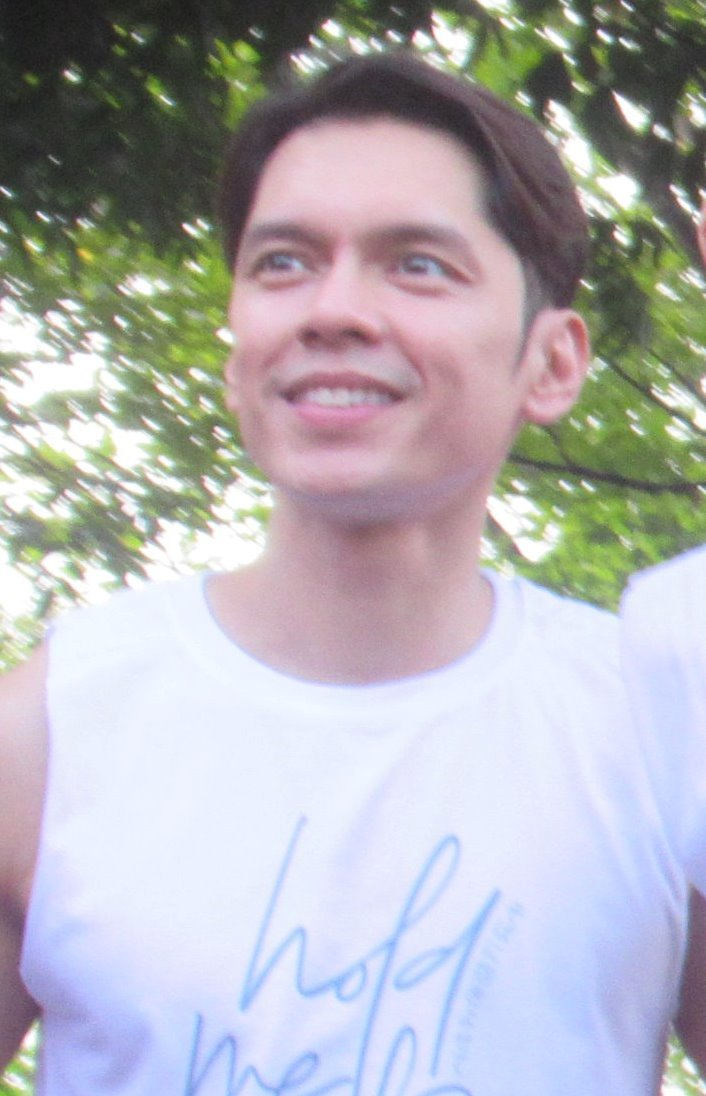
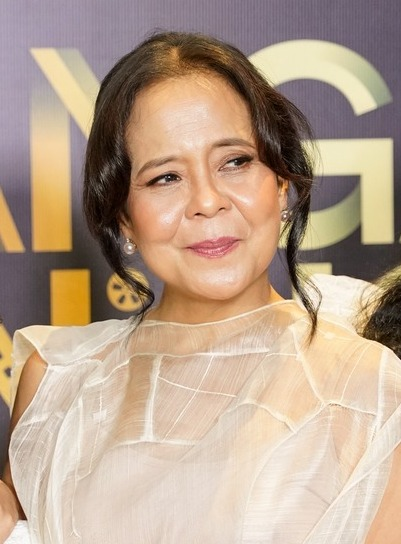
Carlo Aquino and Dolly de Leon appeared in Iti Mapukpukaw.

At the same year, Papa's psychological drama science-fiction Iti Mapukpukaw (2023), revolves an animator without a mouth (Carlo Aquino) prompted by his mother (Dolly de Leon) to visit his uncle, which leads to the return of an alien he encountered in childhood intent on taking him away from Earth. The film garnered several awards, including Best Film at the 19th Cinemalaya Independent Film Festival and 47th Gawad Urian Awards, the first animated film to do so. It makes history as one of four films and the only animation in the group that is entered in the 81st Golden Globe Awards and for the submission as the Philippine entry for the Best International Feature Film category at the 96th Academy Awards, the first animated film to be submitted by the Philippines. The film won Best Animated Film at the 17th Asia Pacific Screen Awards, the first Filipino animated film to win this feat.

At the same year, GMA Pictures announced their upcoming first foray to adult animated feature films: Carl Joseph Papa's animated docudrama 58th about the Maguindanao massacre that took place in 2009, and Mervin Malonzo's Ella Arcangel: Awit ng Pangil at Kuko, based on a 2017 komik Ella Arcangel by Julius Villanueva.

== Topics ==
=== Aesthetics ===
All of the animated works have different narrative aesthetics such as history (e.g. Urduja), mythology (e.g. RPG Metanoia), supernatural (e.g. Dayo: Sa Mundo ng Elementalia), satire (e.g. Heneral Tuna), non-narrative (e.g. Project1), and adult animation (e.g. Manang Biring and Hayop Ka!).

=== Types ===
Films, shorts, and televisions have different types of animation:

- Traditional – a first animation technique that introduced in the 1950s by Larry Alcala, used primarily in which frames are hand-drawn, cel or digitalized.
- Stop-motion – an animation technique that introduced at the near end of the regime, used for satirical and fictionalized storytelling. Stop-motion animation have different technical forms: Brickfilm, clay, glass, paper cutouts and pixilation.
- Rotoscoping – an animation technique that animators use to trace over live-action footages, frame by frame, to produce realistic action.
- CGI – an animation technique that rarely use as an art form of creating moving images using computers.
- RPG Maker – an animation technique that rarely use of RPG Maker engines to create a cinematic production via screencast, similar to machinima.

=== Styles ===
Filipino filmmakers and animators have distinctive, visual style of animation that influences cultural art form.

- Adarna: The Mythical Bird and Urduja are strong influences from Western animation, mainly the films of Walt Disney Animation Studios; the character design and use anthropomorphism or personification of human attributes through animals as sidekicks in Urduja that reminiscences of Pocahontas and Mulan.
- Carl Joseph Papa's films are heavily inspired by Richard Linklater's adult animated films, most primarily Waking Life. Both filmmakers have conventional storytelling with detailed range of mature themes, philosophical issues and primary use of rotoscoping.

== Animation in live action films ==
A pixilation scene in the 1995 film The Short Life of Fire.

Early animation in live-action films released in the 1990s were significantly rare at the times. This included the 1995 fantasy short film The Short Life of Fire, Act 2 Scene 2: Suring and the Cuckoo (Filipino: Ang maikling buhay ng apoy, Act 2 Scene 2: Suring at ang kuk-ok), utilized trick animation or pixilation in some scenes.

In 1995, Isko: Adventures in Animasia utilized traditional animation in some scenes within almost 10 minutes.

Some animated scenes are depicted in Alipato: The Very Brief Life of an Ember, an extreme collage film about juvenile gangsters rob and killed everyone until a failed bank robbery puts them in prison. Animated scenes utilized stop-motion animation.

== People ==
While some well-known cartoonists in the 1950s and 1980s who are considered animation pioneers, these are some people as animation filmmakers or animators listed below:

=== Alcarazen Brothers ===
Mike and Juan Alcarazen are animation siblings who is known for stop-motion short films with satirical elements in the 1980s.

=== Benedict Carandang ===
Recognized Filipino animator is Benedict Carandang, the co-founder of Tuldok Animation Studios and recipient of the United Kingdom's British Council's 2008 Young Screen Entrepreneur. Carandang produced the animation of Ramon del Prado's short-film entitled, Libingan or “The Burial”, inspired by the hanging coffins of Sagada, Mountain Province.

=== Avid Liongoren ===
Avid Liongoren is known for both animated and live-action productions, and founded an animation production company Rocketsheep Studios. He has directed two films: Saving Sally and Hayop Ka! (2020).

=== Carl Joseph Papa ===
Carl Joseph Papa is known for adult-oriented rotoscoping animated films, produced three award-winning animation works: Manang Biring (2015), Paglisan (2018), and Iti Mapukpukaw (2023). His films have been screened at film festivals worldwide and received multiple awards.

=== Roxlee ===
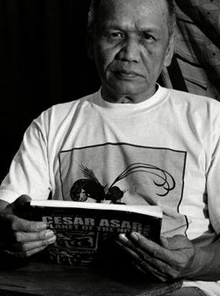
Roxlee in 2011.

Roque Federizon Lee is an animator, filmmaker, cartoonist, and painter who is known as the godfather of young Filipino experimental filmmakers and classics of the Philippine animation and independent film movement of the 1980s.

He directed a succession of experimental animated shorts in Super 8 and 16mm—made both individually and with a revolving cast of collaborators—cementing his mark on the cultural topography: The Great Smoke (1984), Tao at Kambing (Man and Goat, 1984), Inserts and ABCD (both 1985), Ink (1987), Juan Gapang (Johnny Crawl, 1987), Pencil (1989), and Spit / Optik (1989).

=== Arnold Arre ===
Clem Arnold Lawrence Arre is a comic book writer who was known for Animahenasyon-commissioned animated short films.

=== Other people ===
- Joey and Roby Agbayani
- Jerome Alcordo
- Nelson "Blog" Caliguia Jr.
- Nelson B. Caliguia Sr.
- Melvin S. Calingo
- Carlo J. Caparas
- Demetrio E. Celestino III
- Emmanuel "Nonoy" Dadivas
- Mervin Malonzo
- Mark Mendoza
- Ellen Ramos

== Outsourced animation ==
While the Philippine animation came from conventional storytelling and originality in Philippine tradition, the Philippines has become a major hub for outsourced animation work from international studios, such as Walt Disney Animation Studios and Bento Box Entertainment, due to its talented artists and lower production costs.

== Industry ==
=== Animation Council of the Philippines ===
The Animation Council of the Philippines, Inc. is the industry association and serves as the primary overseer and coordinator for Filipino animators. The council is a part of a bigger umbrella association coordinated by the Information Technology and Business Process Association of the Philippines (IBPAP).

=== Rocketsheep Studio ===
Rocketsheep Studio is an independent film studio used for live-action and animated projects, founded by Avid Liongoren in 2005. Films and web series are well known in this studio including Hayop Ka!, Heneral Tuna and Saving Sally.

=== Tuldok Animation Studios ===
Tuldok Animation Studios is a Philippine non profit organization that produces, promotes, and facilitates animated projects in line with traditional Filipino values, co-founded by Ramon del Prado, Benedict Carandang, Ayeen Pineda, and Toffer Liu. The organization is well known for animated projects including Sulayman.

== Film festivals ==
=== Philippine Graphic Expo ===
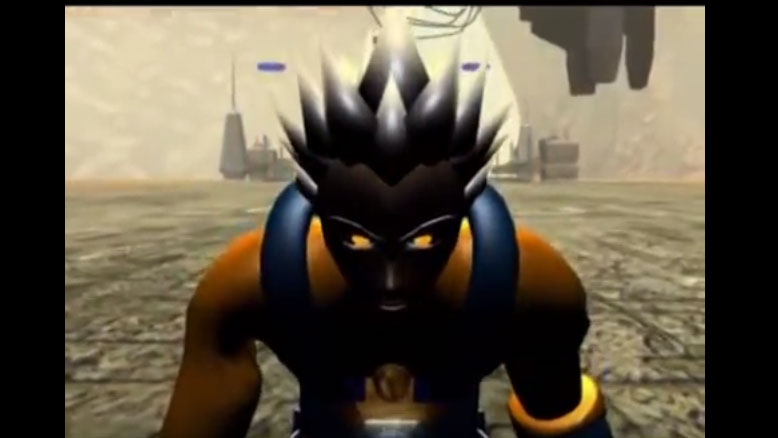
Fiesta Karera, a 6-minute 3D animation entry of DLS-College of St. Benilde that won the 1st Philippine Animation Competition

The First Philippine animation festival was held in Pasay as an additional program of the 7th Philippine Graphic Expo of 2002 which featured 3D animation entries from De La Salle–College of Saint Benilde, University of the Philippines Diliman and Philippine Women's University via Artfarm and Animasia.

It was College of St. Benilde's entry, Fiesta Karera that won the festival which was authored by Ervin Malicdem, Dante Tiongson, Mark Ylagan, Jonathan Wongkee, Jefferson Lim, Vincent Cheng, Gerard Cruzado, Justin Teh, and Ace Gatdula.

=== Animahenasyon ===
Animahenasyon, an annual film festival for Philippine animated films.

Animahenasyon, a Filipinized contraction of animation and imagination, is a Philippine animation festival established by the Animation Council of the Philippines. Its purpose is to recognize Filipino animators and their original works and has become an institution with hundreds of animators joining every year, with contestants varying from students to teachers and professionals.

Known filmmakers who screened at the film festival with their own animated short films and won the major award in the competition such as Ionone Bangcas and Jerome Alcordo's Smog (2010) and Sulundon (2012), and Carl Joseph Papa's Love Bites (2017).

Films in Animahenasyon are also among the grand prize winners of the festival. In 2008, Love and Marriage by Kenny Lynn Taiayapa won the grand prize; Mutya (Muse) by Nelson Caliguia Jr. won in 2009; When Alma Died by Richmond Wesley Ruiz Tan won in 2010; Sanayan lang ang Pagpatay by Gil Joseph Sanchez won in 2011; Marianing by Niko Salazar won in 2012; Buhay Kubo by Ellen Ramos won in 2013; Lakas ng Lahi by Arnold Arre won in 2014; GEO by John Aurthur Mercader won in 2015; and Strings by Rafael Daniel Evangelista won in 2016.

=== Cinema One Originals Film Festival ===

The Cinema One Originals Film Festival, a division of ABS-CBN Films commonly known as Cinema One Originals, is an independent film festival in the Philippines originated for live-action feature films.

Carl Joseph Papa's Manang Biring and Paglisan are the only two animated films to be screened at the festival and won multiple awards including Best Film.

=== Metro Manila Film Festival ===

The Metro Manila Film Festival (MMFF) is an annual film festival organized by the Metro Manila Development Authority, focuses on Filipino produced films.

While Isko: Adventures in Animasia is the first hybrid film, Adarna: The Mythical Bird is officially the first animated film to be screened at the festival. Among other animated films who also screened at the festival and won many awards in many years including Dayo: Sa Mundo ng Elementalia (Best Sound, Best Visual Effects, Best Musical Score, and Best Original Theme Song), RPG Metanoia (3rd Best Picture, Best Sound Recording, and Best Original Theme Song), and Saving Sally (Best Musical Score).

The MMFF films are the winners of the festival under New Wave Category: Kaleh and Mbaki by Dennis Sebastian (won in 2013); An Maogmang Lugar by Mary Ann Espedido (won in 2014); and Buttons by Marvel Obemio, Francis Ramirez, and Jared Garcia (won in 2015). In 2016, the category was discontinued and short films were partnered with the full-length films. Passage of Life, an animated drama by De La Salle-College of St. Benilde students Renz Vincemark Cruz and Hannah Gayapa, won Best Work for Children.

=== I Animate Animation Film Festival ===
I Animate Animation Film Festival is a non-competitive limited film festival founded by Film Development Council of the Philippines. It will feature talkback sessions with various figures in the animation industry, as well as screenings of Filipino-made animated films and critically acclaimed independent animated films from over the world. Films, with exceptions of non-Filipino animated films, such as Nonoy Dadivas's Junkzilla (1995) and Roxlee's Spit (1989).

== Filmography ==
Over the years, majority of Philippine-made international animated films (both feature and short) and series are largely outsourced by companies in the United States and Japan. In the past years, the Filipino animation industry began to create animations directed to Filipino and international audiences, such as Seven Little Monsters and Hazbin Hotel.

Only a few animated films and series, but extensively expanding animated short films, are actually made by Filipinos or Filipino diasporas specifically for Filipino audiences, although the number of films and series produced is still small compared to those produced by Japan, China, South Korea, and the United States. Most of these films are adult-oriented themes and have been released etensively for film festivals.

- Conversation in Space (1961) – directed by Rodolfo Paras-Perez; non-narrative short film
- Tadhana (1978) – directed by Nonoy Marcelo; television film
- Adarna: The Mythical Bird (1997) – directed by Geirry Garccia; feature film
- Fly Aswang (2005) – directed by Mark Galvez; short film
- Urduja (2008) – directed by Reggie Entienza; feature film
- Dayo: Sa Mundo ng Elementalia (2008) – directed by Robert Quilao; feature film
- RPG Metanoia (2010) – directed by Luis C. Suárez; CGI feature film
- Super Inggo at ang Super Tropa (2009–2011) – created by Enrico C. Santos; anime-inspired television series
- Alamat (2015–2016) – created by Jeffrey John Imutan; Flash television series
- Manang Biring (2015) – directed by Carl Joseph Papa; rotoscoping feature film
- Saving Sally (2016) – directed by Avid Liongoren; feature film
- Barangay 143 (2018–2021) – created by Katski Flores; anime-inspired television series
- Paglisan (2018) – directed by Carl Joseph Papa; feature film
- Cleaners (2019) – directed by Glenn Barit; stop motion feature film
- Hayop Ka! (2020) – directed by Avid Liongoren; feature film
- Heneral Tuna (2021) – created by Avid Liongoren; web series
- Trese (2021) – created by Budjette Tan and Kajo Baldisimo; anime-inspired television series
- Hero City Kids Force (2021–2022) – created by Nono Pardalis; television series
- Iti Mapukpukaw (2023) – directed by Carl Joseph Papa; rotoscoping feature film
- Ella Arcangel: Ballad of Tooth and Claw (upcoming) – directed by Mervin Malonzo; feature film
- Sun Chaser (upcoming) – created by Bernard Badion and Bobby Pontillas; television series
- Zsazsa Zaturnnah vs the Amazonistas of Planet X (upcoming) – directed by Avid Liongoren; feature film

== Lost, cancelled and rediscovered ==
A number of Filipino animated works, primarily Ang Panday, Sa Pagilid-gilid, and Adarna, are considered lost or partially found.

Division of Existence was supposed to be released in December 2017 through YouTube, but it never came to fruition due to lack of development and updates led to cancellation as of July 2017.

Only the remaining copies of animated features and short films in late-20th century are rediscovered or survived at this point in the late 2010s including Tadhana, The Criminal and The Eye of the Sky, the latter two were released on YouTube. Tadhana was screened at the National Gallery Singapore’s "Painting with Light" by Mowelfund Film Institute and Archivo 1984 in 2018, thanks to Pandy Aviado, one of the cast members of the film, who revealed that he had the remaining copy of the film shown at live interview.

== See also ==
- Cinema in the Philippines
- Independent animation
- Philippine New Wave
