= José Zabala-Santos =

Filipino cartoonist (1911–1985)

José Zabala Santos
- Born: July 20, 1911; Calumpit, Bulacan, Insular Government of the Philippine Islands, U.S.
- Died: September 7, 1985 (aged 74); Manila, Philippines
- Other names: Mang Pepe
- Occupation: Cartoonist
- Relatives: Nonoy Marcelo (nephew)

José Zabala-Santos (sometimes spelled as Jose Zabala Santos) (20 July 1911 – September 7, 1985), nicknamed as "Mang Pepe" ("Mister Pepe" in the Tagalog language) by hometown neighbors and as "Zabala" by colleagues in the cartooning profession, was a successful cartoonist in the Philippines and was one of the pioneers of Philippine comics. He became one of the most popular cartoonists in the Philippines during the 1950s because of his cartoon characters such Popoy, Sianong Sano, and Lukas Malakas. Zabala is one of the "respected names" of artists in the Philippine cartoon and comics industry.

== Biography ==
Although born in Calumpit, Bulacan, Philippines in 1911, Zabala spent his childhood years in Malabon, Rizal. He was a resident of Kuatro Kantos, Malabon. He first learned how to draw through his mother, a painter.

=== Education ===
He attended college at the School of Fine Arts of the University of the Philippines, where he met Francisco Reyes, another Philippine comics pioneer. However, he quit school when he was 16 years old. One of the reasons is that the UP School of Fine Arts was not offering cartooning classes He instead opted to enroll and earned a diploma in a cartooning course offered in the United States via correspondence learning.

=== Career ===
Zabala officially started his cartooning career in 1932 through the sponsorship of Amado V. Hernandez, who was then the editor of Sampaguita magazine. It was during this time that he created the characters Titina, Lukas Malakas, and Popoy. After the demise of Sampaguita magazine, Zabala moved to Liwayway Publications, where he created the cartoon character name Sianong Sano in 1935 for the Tagalog-language magazine Liwayway. Through Liwayway, Zabala's Lukas Malakas became popular.

Although popularized by Larry Alcala – one of Zabala's students – Zabala was the original creator of the so-called Slice of Life cartoon page. Zabala's version of "Slice of Life" is titled Lifestyle. He temporarily interrupted his cartooning career in 1941 upon the onset of World War II. From 1942 to 1948, he worked for the art department of the Manalang Advertising Agency. It was in the advertising field where Zabala became interested in the art of animation. After World War II, Zabala moved to Halakhak Komiks to create Pinoy, a cartoon character that had similarities to his Popoy character in Liwayway magazine. He also illustrated comic book covers while working for Halakhak Komiks. Zabala's Si Pino was one of the comic strips featured in the first issue of Halakhak Komiks.

After the declaration of Martial Law in the Philippines in 1972, Zabala retired from his cartooning career in Philippine comics to work instead for the Philippine Manufacturing Company (PMC, now known as Procter & Gamble) in 1949. In 1955, Zabala worked on an animation project entitled Juan Tamad (“Lazy John” or “John the Lazy”) in cooperation with Francisco Reyes. While working at the Philippine Manufacturing Company, Zabala shot and produced a six-minute 35-mm animated short film for a product of the company. However, there was no certainty whether the film that was processed in the United States had actually been presented as a commercial.

In 1970, Zabala retired from the Philippine Manufacturing Company in order to join the advertising agency of Francisco Reyes, another Filipino pioneer in comics. In 1978, Zabala joined his nephew Nonoy Marcelo, also a cartoonist to work on the production of Tadhana ("Destiny"), the first-ever Philippine feature-length animation film.

=== Death ===
Zabala died in 1985 at the age of 74.

== Awards ==
Zabala received honors and recognitions for his contribution to the Philippine comics and magazine industry. His awards included the Komiks Operation Brotherhood (KOMOPEB) Life Achievement Award (1984) and the 4th Gintong Parangal ng Malabon's Gawad ng Katangian (1984). Zabala was posthumously awarded the Lifetime Achievement Award by the Animation Council of the Philippines, Inc. (ACPI) during the November 25 to 28, 2009 Animahenasyon Pinoy Animation Festival that was held at the Gateway Mall, Araneta Center, Cubao, Quezon City.

== See also ==
- Filipino cartoon and animation
- Tony Velasquez
- Vicente Manansala
- Francisco Coching
- Larry Alcala
