= Lea's Secret =

Filipino animated short film

- Release poster
- Directed by: Rico Gutierrez
- Screenplay by: Augie Rivera
- Based on: Ang Lihim ni Lea by Augie Rivera
- Produced by: Rico Gutierrez
- Starring: Princess Shanel Cuvinar; Alessandra De Rossi; Stella Cañete; Candy Pangilinan; Geraldine Villamil
- Narrated by: Eugene Domingo
- Release date: 2020
- Running time: 8 minutes
- Country: Philippines
- Languages: Filipino; English

Ang Lihim ni Lea (lit. 'Lea's Secret') is a 2020 Philippine animated fantasy drama short film directed by Rico Gutierrez. Based on the 2007 children's book of the same name by Augie Rivera, the film's plot tackles child sexual abuse through the eyes of a young girl with her own "superpowers".

The film features ensemble casts including Princess Shanel Cuvinar, Eugene Domingo, Alessandra De Rossi, Stella Cañete, Candy Pangilinan, and Geraldine Villamil.

== Plot ==
The film revolves Lea, a beautiful young girl who moves into a new condominium with her father. Lea later discovers her own powers that she can go through walls and doors, and she marvels at her adventures to cope with sexual abuse done by her father. She is excited to try out her powers at school, but only to later realize that her powers are not what they seem.

== Release ==
It was screened at multiple times including Buenos Aires, Cannes and American International Film Festival.

== Awards ==
Award	Category	Ref.
American Golden Picture International Film Festival	Best Animated Short Film	
Buenos Aires International Film Festival	Best Short Film Animation	
Cannes International Independent Film Festival	Grand Prize Animation (Silk Road Award)	
Europe Film Festival	Best Creative	
Independent Shorts Awards	Best Children Short Film	
Indie Short Fest	Best Children Short Film	
New York International Film Awards	Grand Jury Award	
New York International Film Awards	Best Original Story	
New York International Film Awards	Best Animation	
Oniros Film Festival	Best Original Story	
Oniros Film Festival	Best Main Theme	
Top Shorts Film Festival	Best Director (Honorable Mention)	
Top Shorts Film Festival	Best Animation	
