= Heneral Tuna =

2021 Philippine animated web miniseries

- Genre: Science fiction Educational
- Written by: Carlo Vergara
- Directed by: Avid Liongoren
- Starring: Manny Angeles
- Country of origin: Philippines
- Original language: Filipino
- No. of episodes: 7

Production
- Running time: 3 minutes
- Production company: Rocketsheep Studio

Original release
- Network: FDCP Channel; Kumu
- Release: October 15 – November 26, 2021

Heneral Tuna is a 2021 Philippine animated web miniseries directed by Avid Liongoren under Rocketsheep Studio.

== Premise ==
Heneral Tuna, an alien cat from the Planet Mingming is tasked to invade Earth and accidentally crashlands in Barangay Hiraya, a fictional location in the Philippines. Not wanting to waste time, he starts a reconnaissance mission to observe the locals as part of a preparation for an invasion. He learns about Filipino values and culture in the process.

== Characters ==
- Heneral Tuna (voiced by Manny Angeles), a blue cat-like alien soldier from the Planet Mingming
- Residents of Barangay Hiraya (Captain Junjun, Lola Lea, Mama Me, Manay Femy, Pat-pat)

== Production ==
Heneral Tuna was produced by Rocketsheep Studio with Avid Liongoren as director and Carlo Vergara as its scriptwriter.

The National Commission for Culture and the Arts (NCCA) commissioned an animated series for its Filipino Values Program. Prior to Heneral Tuna's release, the cultural agency launched a study with the National Economic and Development Authority (NEDA) in 2019 to determined values held among Filipinos in the country. Among the top 20 values identified in the study which influenced Heneral Tuna's production were " family, faith, resilience, care for environment, honesty, love for country, valuing culture and arts, and good governance". Each of the first seven episode feature a value. There are plans to feature the rest of the 13 values but it would still depend on the reception to the initial release of the series. The values are presented in the "context of the pandemic". Heneral Tuna is the first involvement of the NCCA in animation, having commissioned the live action teleserye Project Destination.

The series revolves around an alien cat who lands in a barangay in the Philippines. Liongoren said that the production team has considered two alternate concepts for a Filipino values-oriented series: a young Jose Rizal who time travels to the future, a robot built by an old scientist who learns how to be human, and a high school of tikbalangs and manananggals who stops eating Filipinos after learning more about them. The adopted concept involving a cat protagonist was inspired from a YouTube video of a cat who thinks about how miserable it was in the company of humans. Liongoren contrasts cats to dogs, noting the common characterization of dog characters as "perpetually happy". He describes cats as more communicative who often indulge in "internal monologues".

According to Vergara, he wrote the cat protagonist with the mindset similar to a "child trying to explore the world" but maintains that the series could be enjoyed by an older audience. He also added that he tends to incorporate comedy in the stories he writes, including Heneral Tuna. The fictional setting of Barangay Hiraya is based on a real life community in Pila, Laguna.

The production of Heneral Tuna began in August 2020 and ended a year later.

== Release ==
Heneral Tuna premiered online on October 15, 2021, on the Film Development Council of the Philippines's paid subscription service FDCP Channel as well as in Kumu. The series will have seven episodes with each having a run-time of about three minutes. An episode will be released every week on Fridays. The series was produced in Filipino language with English subtitles.

== Episodes ==
| No. | Title (Note: Each episode has two alternate titles. The second title, displayed in end credits is named after a Filipino value.) | Original release date |
|---|---|---|
| 1 | "Ang Mahalagang Misyon" / "Pagmamahal sa Pamilya" (lit. 'The Important Mission / Love for Family') | October 15, 2021 |
| 2 | "Ang Matulunging Kapitan" / "Pakikipagkapuwa" (lit. 'The Helpful Captain / Fellowship') | October 22, 2021 |
| 3 | "Ang Mahiwagang Nilalang / Pananampalataya" (lit. 'The Mysterious Being / Faith') | October 29, 2021 |
| 4 | "Ang Pancit Hiraya" / "Pagpapahalaga sa Kultura, Sining, at Agham" | November 5, 2021 |
| 5 | "Ang Discovery" / "Kalusugan at Kagalingan" | November 12, 2021 |
| 6 | "Ang Kakaibang Katangian / "Buhay at Tunguhin" | November 19, 2021 |
| 7 | "Ang Matibay na Barangay" / "Katatagan" | November 26, 2021 |

== See also ==
- Hayop Ka!
- Saving Sally
