= Reversion (2012 film) =

- Directed by: Giancarlo Ng
- Written by: Giancarlo Ng
- Starring: Daniela Hummel
- Music by: Dan Eckert
- Production company: The Magic Movie Machine
- Release date: August 8, 2012 (online release)
- Running time: 11 minutes
- Countries: Philippines; International
- Language: English

Reversion is a 2012 adult animated short film directed by Giancarlo Ng and produced by The Magic Movie Machine, a self-described collaborative animation team.

The 11-minute short film was created using Blender. Reversion was awarded Best Design at the 2012 Suzanne Awards and Best in Technical Quality at Animahenasyon 2012. The short film was also named as a Division II winner at Asiagraph 2013 held in Tokyo, Japan.

== Plot ==
The short film opens with an unidentified soldier infiltrating the facilities of a company known as 'Ethercorp'. Though the lobby is badly damaged, a still-functional computer display reveals the facility to be a medical research centre, located in the Congo. The soldier's helmet also bears Ethercorp's logo. As the soldier downloads tracking software from the computer, a reptilian creature lurks in the shadows above. Just before the creature strikes, the tracking software warns the soldier of its presence, and the creature flees under gunfire. The soldier chases the creature though several offices and medical labs, before losing it in a dark corridor.

The soldier emerges from a duct in the floor of another corridor, and enters a security room containing a holographic projector. The soldier removes her helmet, revealing herself to be a young woman. By viewing the holographic records, she discovers footage of a human test subject being administered an injection, which triggers a metamorphosis into the creature she had been pursuing. In shock, the soldier leaves her helmet in the security room to record the footage, and enters an elevator.

The female soldier emerges from the elevator into an indoor garden, and encounters the reptilian creature. She hesitates to shoot it, but is forced to fire when it charges. The creature retreats, then leaps at the soldier from a high ledge. The soldier's pistol runs out of ammunition, and she pulls out a knife as the creature falls down on her.

A series of clips during the credits reveal that the creature has been killed by a knife wound to the neck. A holographic message on her wrist prompts the soldier to confirm extraction, but she instead switches the hologram off.

== Awards and nominations ==
Award	Year	Category	Nominee(s)	Result
Suzanne Awards	2012	Best Designed Short Film	Giancarlo Ng and The Magic Movie Machine	Won
Animahenasyon	2012	Best in Technical Quality	Giancarlo Ng and The Magic Movie Machine	Won
Asiagraph 2013 (Tokyo, Japan)	2013	Division II	Giancarlo Ng and The Magic Movie Machine	Won

== See also ==
- Blender
