= Animahenasyon =

Filipino animation festival

- Location: Philippines
- Established: 2007
- Hosted by: Animation Council of the Philippines
- Language: English, Filipino
- Website: www.animahenasyon.com

Animahenasyon is an annual animation festival and competition held in the Philippines. Organized by the Animation Council of the Philippines, Inc. (ACPI), the festival features the animated works of veteran and novice Filipino animators. Apart from the competition, the festival holds classes, seminars, workshops, and exhibits related to the animation profession. It has the aim of harvesting the talent and creativity of aspiring artists and animators in the Philippines. It is considered as an annual, important celebration of the animation industry in the Philippines.

== Etymology ==
The name "Animahenasyon" is the product after combining the Filipino-language words for "animation" and "imagination", namely animasyon and imahenasyon (also spelled as imahinasyon) respectively. In English, the wordplay would result to "animagination". The message of the term Animahenasyon indicated the goal of the Animation Council of the Philippines, Inc. to portray the image of the Philippines as a "nation of animators" internationally.

== Purpose ==
In general, the aim of the Animahenasyon as a flagship project of the Animation Council of the Philippines, Inc. is for the Philippine animation festival to serve as a venue for Filipino animators in showcasing their ideas, and to be able to meet established animators in the industry and become inspired by them. Another goal is to create a larger window of exposure of and awareness about the Filipino animation industry, including the industry’s contribution to the international entertainment field. Animahenasyon taps on locally produced animation materials and content that can be promoted and marketed both within the Philippines and internationally. In an effort to build an audience, awareness and development of original contents, ACPI organizes its flagship project Animahenasyon with the following additional objectives: to encourage potential animators to explore the opportunities available in the industry; to provide a location for exchanging ideas and possible business opportunities among animators, producers, and supporters of the industry; and to hold forums that will discuss and set the direction for the development of the industry.

In 2025, Animahenasyon partnered with the Center for International Trade Expositions and Missions (CITEM) through its CREATEPhilippines initiative to support the growth of the Philippine animation industry. Organized by the Animation Council of the Philippines, the festival featured exhibitions, film screenings, talks, and competitions highlighting works by professional and student Filipino animators. The event also introduced AniBusiness, a business-to-business component aimed at encouraging international partnerships, co-productions, and outsourcing opportunities within the global animation market.

== Composition ==
The major parts of the Animahenasyon is the granting of the Lifetime Achievement Award and the Outstanding Emerging Artist in Animation Award. The screening of animated works for both amateur and professional divisions included different running time categories, namely the 1 to 5 minutes run, the 6 to 20 minutes run, the 21 to 60 minutes run, and finally the 60 minutes run – also known as full-animated feature. Other categories included the presentation of music videos, title sequences, public information, demonstration reels, and television series. For the exhibitions, the categories are full-length animation, special citation, and the presentation of past Animahenasyon winners.

== Festivals ==
Festival	Dates	Grand winners	Venue
Animahensyon 2007: 1st Philippine Animation Festival	21–25 November 2007	Inday Wanda / Doodle Of Doom (tied)	IndieSine, Robinsons Galleria
Animahensyon 2008: 2nd Philippine Animation Festival	12–16 November 2008	Love and Marriage	De La Salle–College of Saint Benilde
Animahensyon 2009: 3rd Philippine Animation Festival	25–28 November 2009	Mutya	Gateway Mall (Araneta Center)
Animahensyon 2010: 4th Philippine Animation Festival	23–25 November 2010	When Alma Died	Ateneo de Naga University
Animahensyon 2011: 5th Philippine Animation Festival	22–25 November 2011	Sanayan Lang ang Pagpatay	Eastwood City
Animahensyon 2012: 6th Philippine Animation Festival	26–29 November 2012	Marianing	De La Salle–College of Saint Benilde
Animahensyon 2013: 7th Philippine Animation Festival	19–22 November 2013	Buhay Kubo	West Visayas State University
Animahensyon 2014: 8th Philippine Animation Festival	25–28 November 2014	Lakas ng Lahi	iAcademy
Animahensyon 2015: 9th Philippine Animation Festival	15–16 October 2015	GEO	SM Aura Premier
Animahensyon 2016: 10th Philippine Animation Festival	22–24 November 2016	Passage of Life	SM Aura Premier
Animahensyon 2017: 11th Philippine Animation Festival	9–12, 17–19 November 2017	Diskarte (Student) / Playground Beyond (Professional)	SM Aura Premier and Cultural Center of the Philippines
Animahensyon 2018: 12th Philippine Animation Festival	9–10 November 2018	Sober (Student) / Love Bites (Professional)	SM Aura Premier
Animahensyon 2019: 13th Philippine Animation Festival	8 November 2019	Pass (Student) / Billy & Bonnie in All Shapes & Sizes (Professional)	SM Aura Premier
Animahensyon 2020: 14th Philippine Animation Festival	9–21 November 2020	Ella Arcangel: Lullaby in the Dark	Virtual via Zoom and Facebook Live
Animahensyon 2021: 15th Philippine Animation Festival	14 November 2021	Stay	Virtual via Zoom and Facebook Live
Animahensyon 2022: 16th Philippine Animation Festival	18–20 November 2022	Dear Friend (Student) / Klikbot Guardian: Kalamity (Professional)	Virtual via Zoom and Facebook Live
Animahensyon 2023: 17th Philippine Animation Festival	2023	Grace (Student) / Mahalt (Professional)	Virtual via Zoom and Facebook Live
Animahensyon 2024: 18th Philippine Animation Festival	2024	Daisy (Student) / Kampana (Professional)	Virtual via Zoom and Facebook Live

== Accolades ==
=== Animahenasyon Institutional Award ===
Year	Awardee	Note	Ref.
2009	Ateneo de Naga University, Department of Digital Arts and Computer Animation	"for its consistent and active participation in the Animahenasyon Pinoy Animation Festival for three consecutive years, for producing a body of animated works on a par with industry standards that has resulted in the creative melding of the academe and industry, and for its continuous effort in promoting and creating original Filipino content in animation."	

=== Lifetime Achievement Award ===
Year	Awardee	Note	Ref.
2007	Larry Alcala		
2008	Severino "Nonoy" Marcelo		
2009	José Zabala-Santos	"for his significant contributions and outstanding original body of work that have shaped the beginning of Philippine animation, for his pioneering spirit in promoting, instilling and integrating Filipino culture in his work, for continually demonstrating and setting aesthetic excellence in his craft, and for all his artistic endeavors and unwavering effort in keeping the creative industry alive in the country."	
2010	Roxlee	"for his significant contributions and outstanding original body of work that have shaped the beginning of Philippine animation, for his pioneering spirit in promoting, instilling and integrating Filipino culture in his work, for continually demonstrating and setting aesthetic excellence in his craft, and for all his artistic endeavors and unwavering effort in keeping the creative industry alive in the country."	
2011	Geirry Garccia		

== Records ==
=== By person ===
The following people received at least 4 wins overall:

Wins	Name	Accolades
7	Nelson “Blog” Caliguia, Jr.	Inday Wanda (2007): Grand Prize, Professional Division: 6-20 minutes; Doodle Of Doom (2007): Grand Prize, Student Division: 1-5 minutes; Mutya (2009): Grand Prize, Hero TV's Choice, Professional Division: 6-20 minutes
7	Arnold Arre	Andong Agimat (2013): Special Jury Prize, Professional Division: 1-5 minutes; Kaninong Anino? (2013): Professional Division: Music Video; Milkyboy (2013): Excellence in Storytelling; Lakas ng Lahi (2014): Grand Prize, Excellence in Technical, Professional Division: 6-20 minutes
4	Jerome Alcordo	Sulundon (2010): Excellence in Regional; Smog (2010): Professional Division: 1-5 minutes; Sincillola (2011): Audience Choice Award, Excellence in Regional
4	Ivan Despi	Just-tiis League (2008): Jury Prize, Professional Division: Reels; Katchatore (2008): Professional Division: 1-5 minutes; We Give It Sometimes (2008): Professional Division: Music Videos
4	Carl Joseph Papa	Love Bites (2018): Grand Prize, Excellence in Storytelling, Excellence in Technical, Best Production Design

== See also ==
- List of animation awards
- Filipino cartoon and animation
