= Pikyaw =

PIKYAW
- Directed by: Arnold Fuentes
- Screenplay by: Mahnnie Tolentino
- Story by: Arnold Fuentes
- Produced by: Mahnnie Tolentino; Seth dA. Nono; Ralph Peñalosa
- Starring: Jef Ephraim Calusay, Robeh Carl Huesca, Augustus Alolor, Marjorie Buton, Adrian Hernia, Mark Anthony Escobañez, Marylour Avila
- Edited by: Mahnnie Tolentino
- Music by: Think Logic Records
- Production companies: Multimedia Arts & Graphics Ensemble (MAGE), Inc.
- Distributed by: Multimedia Arts & Graphics Ensemble (MAGE), Inc.
- Release date: February 26, 2014
- Running time: 60 minutes
- Country: Philippines
- Language: Hiligaynon

Pikyaw is a 2014 Philippine animated adventure film produced by Multimedia Arts & Graphics Ensemble (MAGE), Inc. and directed by Arnold Fuentes, PIKYAW was the first feature-length animated film dubbed in Hiligaynon and created by artists from Iloilo City, Iloilo, and the first film produced by MAGE, Inc. Pikyaw follows a group of children: Abet, Tyrone, and Marco who finds themselves in a parallel universe that is the subject of revenge by Albion, a creature who lived in Calixto since he was a child. The film was written by Mahnnie Tolentino, and featured music by artists from Think Logic Records, who are all Ilonggo bands. Its executive producers were Mahnnie Tolentino(MAGE Inc.), Ralph Peñalosa(TL Records) and Seth dA. Nono(UI-PHINMA).

MAGE, Inc., which produced events that focuses on Ilonggo artists development, particularly on comic book illustration, cosplay, photography, and animation, approached the University of Iloilo - PHINMA to co-produce an animated feature that would eventually become the first feature-length Ilonggo animated film. Mahnnie Tolentino wrote an early story treatment which was later discarded for being too edgy and mature. After several revisions focusing on a more child-friendly theme, MAGE, Inc., then consisting of a relatively small number of members, together with select students from the University of Iloilo - PHINMA, produced the film under minor financial constraints.

Pikyaw was screened at SM City Iloilo and went on to earn around PhP100,000 in three(3) days, from February 26–28, 2014.

== Plot ==
Saref, an encantada - aswang hybrid creature, told her companions of the coming of the red moon in four weeks. She adds that their revenge on the dwarves is at hand. The monsters, consisting of Albion, Craston, Kaeg and Agas are apparently happy of this development. They were later deployed by Albion to various points of Calixto, a parallel world inhabited by Ilonggo folk creatures.

As this was happening in Calixto, two boys, Abet and Nathan, who lived in Iloilo City, Calixto's parallel world, cut class to play Pikyaw (an antiquated Filipino game) against Marco; a bully who is believed to be the best in the game. Along the way, they met Tyrone after Abet accidentally ripped Tyrone's bag. Abet and Nathan escaped the scene as Tyrone shouts for them to replace his bag. Meanwhile, two dwarves, Unico and Auros, were discussing between themselves of the potentials of Nathan and Marco as champions who they'll bring to Calixto and help them on their fight against Albion. Unico was very happy of getting two big and agile children, but Auros seems to be focused on Abet and his good heart. During the climax of the exciting Pikyaw game between Nathan and Marco, Tyrone came over the playing field with his mother so they can force Abet to replace his bag. While this exchange was going on, Auros alerted Unico that the champions have now gathered and it is time for them to take the champions to Calixto.

A bright light suddenly enveloped the playing field. Abet, Tyrone and Marco find themselves alone with the dwarves who began to tell them of the plan to restore Calixto, but the conversations was cut off due to Auros' inability to keep the connection. The heroes then find themselves inside the University of Iloilo - PHINMA's campus where they defeated Agas and took his stick, which is actually the weapon for Abet. They were able to discover the plan of Albion to abduct Rebecca, Tyrone's househelp, and were able to stop it. The heroes fought with Craston and Kaeg to protect Rebecca from Albion, from which they recovered the Sword of the Mahentoy (Cyclopes) and the Bow of the Encantada (Fairies). After this, they hid at Jaro Cathedral where they met Unico.

Unico explained that Albion (or Terrence as he is known in Iloilo) was one of the children that they took to Calixto as a playmate. This is not an unusual event in Filipino folklore: dwarves abducting children with special abilities/characteristics as playthings. The abduction is supposed to be temporary since the dwarves will have to bring the children back to their families to avoid detection. However, the situation changed when Terrence found a plate of black rice and began to eat some. According to folklore, once you eat food from Calixto, you won't be able to go back until the next selenelion, a rare phenomenon where the moon becomes red due to a lunar eclipse occurring at dawn or dusk. The dwarves, realizing that they have a rare opportunity to keep Terrence, passed up on several chances to bring him back to Iloilo. Terrence resented the dwarves for not doing anything to bring him back and left the dwarves. He rechristened himself as Albion, and with the support of the other folk creatures, set out on revenge against the dwarves.

Saref was able to follow the heroes at Jaro Cathedral and fought with Tyrone and Marco, who took the Bow of the Encantada and the Sword of the Mahentoy, respectively. Their new weapons were able to spawn them new armor as well, and they held Saref off while Abet, Rebecca, and Unico escaped. During the escape, Unico found out that Abet holds half of the weapon of the dwarves: the Sticks of the Dwarves. Unico persuaded Abet to help Tyrone and Marco and gave him the other half of the weapon. When Abet combined the two weapons, he became Lakan, the champion of the dwarves, proficient in the use of Arnis, a Filipino martial art. The three were able to fight off Saref and bound her to the Jaro Belfry. Saref told them that they were too late to save Calixto, since the red moon has appeared and Rebecca isn't saved. It turned out that Saref was trying to save Rebecca from the dwarves.

Unico revealed to Rebecca that Calixto's happiness depended on the dwarves' ability to control the psyche of Calixto. The dwarves' happiness will reflect on Calixto's, therefore their need to take Rebecca as replacement to Albion. Nathan, now the champion of the Kapres wielding a heavy ax, stalled Unico's plan until he was stopped by Abet, Tyrone and Marco. Nathan was helped later by Craston, Kaeg, Agas and Saref. Behind them is Albion, who took Rebecca and Unico. He knocked Unico unconscious and asked Nathan to start the ceremony: kill him and save Rebecca, which will stop the dwarves' system indefinitely. Nathan was later disarmed by Abet, Tyrone and Marco. Albion retaliated and held off Tyrone and Marco and forced Abet to kill him. Abet, left without any choices, changed to Lakan and proceeded to give Albion the killer blow.

Rebecca, realizing that Calixto will not return to normal, interrupted the whole ceremony and sacrificed her future, accepting her fate as Albion's replacement. Albion was adamant that the ceremony continue and persuaded Rebecca not to do it, for she will never be happy in Calixto. Rebecca dismissed this, believing that making others happy is enough to make her happy. After that, Albion reverted to his old form and he returned to Iloilo, together with Abet, Tyrone, Marco and Nathan.

The four children, after making amends and discovering a new bond of friendship, played Pikyaw together as Terrence, now a 46-year-old man, walks by.

== Cast ==
Main Cast

- Jef Ephraim Calusay as Abet
- Robeh Carl Huesca as Tyrone
- Augustus Alolor as Marco
- Adrian Hernia as Nathan
- Marjorie Buton as Rebecca
- Marylour Avila as Saref
- Mark Anthony Escobañez as Albion

Supporting Cast

- Seth Galen Legada as Unico
- Venz Villanueva as Auros
- Ed Celiz as Agas, the Ekek Medicine Man
- Kyle Warren Pueblos as Craston, the Sarangay Captain of the guards
- John Rodnell Vinzon as Kaeg, the Tikbalang King/Queen
- Gina Juarez as Tyrone's Mom
- Paul Justado and Felimon Lacuesta Jr. as Sarangay Minions
- Alfred John Borreros as Lakan

Additional Voices

- Razel Cordova
- Joyce Hossain
- Ray John Lucas
- Anabel Balane
- Japeth Jalando-on
- Thellia Tifina Machan
- Marlon Bartonico
- Jan Darryl Solivas

== Production ==
=== Inspiration and Script ===
Pikyaw started out as a dark tale of a child going underground after his family and community was killed by a group of oppressive creatures. The story was deemed too dark, and Mahnnie Tolentino took over the writing. Of all the story elements in the original by Arnold Fuentes, only the child, Abet and the main villain Albion (previously named Braguda) was left. Mahnnie Tolentino stated that he got the idea of child abduction by dwarves to his own experience when he was younger. "I had my usual siestas on top of a guava tree one afternoon. When I climbed down, there are several police at the house and my mother came to me and told me I was gone for three days." The local albularyo later told his family that he was abducted by dwarves.

Terrence, who later became Albion, is actually an albino, which made him attractive to the dwarves. Dwarves usually abducts children who have special powers or characteristics. This explains his white hair, even as a child.

Saref is a halfling (encantada and aswang). She's an outcast because of being a halfling and served as Terrence's sitter. She later became Albion's most loyal follower.

The three children (Abet, Tyrone and Marco) represented different adolescent personalities that is usually seen in Filipino children: cowardly (Abet), snobbish (Tyrone), and bullyish (Marco). The script was re-written 4 times to accommodate the character development of each child, especially Abet. In previous drafts, Abet's personality closely resembles Marco, but was later changed. Tyrone is the only character that didn't went to a rigorous rewrite. Marco's final design was only done in the final rewrite.

=== Casting ===
A casting call was made exclusively for the University of Iloilo - PHINMA. Numerous students from the College of Information Technology Education (CITE) auditioned for the major roles. Saref and Marco (Marylour and Augustus) were cast on the first day of audition. Voice actors for Albion and Tyrone's mother were also cast.

A second casting call was scheduled again, this time for the Basic Education Department, elementary and high school. The roles for the dwarves, Abet, Tyrone, Lakan, the villains and most of the additional voices were cast.

Mark Anthony Escobañez, the voice of Albion, was the last to be recorded. He replaced another voice actor who wasn't able to record because of previous commitments. Gina Juarez also replaced another voice actress who wasn't able to come for the table read.

=== Animation ===
MAGE, Inc. decided to differentiate itself from other established animation styles. It was initially an anime-type animation but Arnold Fuentes decided to innovate an animation style that is inspired by several characters from Funny Komiks of the late 80s, a style that is very relatable to children. The action sequences were inspired by the Japanese Super Sentai series.

The layouts for the backgrounds were made to match the animation style of the characters, hence the stylized corners and thick borders. All of the layouts were original digital drawings made from photographs collected from various Iloilo City sites.

=== Marketing ===
Marketing for the film included self-financed print advertising, aggressive internet advertising as well as partnerships with the Department of Education, the Commission on Higher Education, the City of Iloilo Tourism Board, Love Radio, Panay News and University of Iloilo's school organ. The marketing was also focused on elementary and high school students around the city, through a campus tour.

=== Charity ===
The proceeds of the movie will be donated to the Philippine National Red Cross and the PHINMA Helping Hands for the rehabilitation of the areas devastated by super typhoon Haiyan, locally named Yolanda.
