= Marla Rausch =

Founder and CEO of Animation Vertigo

- Born: Philippines
- Education: University of the Philippines
- Occupations: Founder and CEO of Animation Vertigo
- Known for: Motion-capture animation

Marla De Castro Rausch is the founder and CEO of Animation Vertigo, a motion-capture animation company.

== Early life and education ==
Rausch was raised in the Philippines and earned her bachelor's degree in mass communications from the University of the Philippines. She migrated to the US in 1999.

== Career ==
Rausch worked freelance for her husband's former animation company L.A. Spectrum Studios and also Sony Computer Entertainment America as a motion capture tracker. Throughout the 1990s, she worked as a visa officer for the Canadian and Australian Embassies in the Philippines. Rausch began her work in the US as a financial advisor with Ameriprise Financial and American Express Financial Advisors.

In 2004, she founded Animation Vertigo, a motion-capture animation company. The company maintains offices in San Francisco and Manila with its headquarters in Irvine, California. In 2015, it had 55 employees. Animation Vertigo processes motion-capture studios' raw data before animators receive it. Roughly 85 percent of Animation Vertigo's work involves video games and the rest is done for TV shows and movies. The company's clients include Activision, Madden NFL, FIFA, the Call of Duty franchise and Jim Carrey’s A Christmas Carol.

In 2024, she is currently working on as a director for her animated feature film debut Afternoons with Lapu-Lapu.

== Personal life ==
Rausch and her family reside in California. She is a member of the Motion Capture Society, Women in Animation and the International Game Developers Association and is involved in organizations that support entrepreneurial spirit and STEAM to mentor females.
