= Fly Aswang =

2005 Philippine animated short film

- Title screen
- Directed by: Mark Galvez
- Written by: Mina Caliguia; Karl de Mesa
- Story by: Mina Caliguia; Bessie Badilla del Castillo; Imee Marcos
- Produced by: Mina Caliguia; Imee Marcos
- Edited by: Joseph Barcena
- Music by: Jojo Acosta; Bluesonic; Darrly Shy; Jeremy Mallorca
- Production companies: Antfarm Asia; Creative Media & Film Society of the Phils.
- Distributed by: Creative Media & Film Society of the Phils.
- Release date: 2005
- Running time: 24 minutes
- Country: Philippines
- Languages: Filipino; English

Fly Aswang is a 2005 Philippine adult animated dark fantasy supernatural horror short film directed by Mark Galvez. It was based on a Philippine mythology that depicted different kinds of mythological creatures such as the Tikbalang, Impakto and Nuno, among others.

== Premise ==
The film tells the story about Bessie and her three daughters emigrated in the United States. Bessie and her daughters, however, are actually Aswang. Against Bessie's wishes not to go to the Philippines, her daughters travel to Manila for their cousin's wedding without warning. Instead, they are trapped in a ritual by mythological creatures, and their family's history of supernatural power will soon be tarnished until Bessie come to save them.

== Cast ==
- Weng Raganit as Bessie, Blanca and Nuno
- Charmaine Sagrado as Isabel, Inez, Lisa and Impakto
- Jeff Utanes as JD, Bessie's father and Mumbaki
- Mark Galvez as Sigbin

== Release ==
Fly Aswang was privately exhibited on film festivals between 2005 and 2008, but not publicly released until October 31, 2022 on YouTube under Imee Marcos's official account.

== Awards ==
Fly Aswang won a "Special Citation" from the Professional Division at the Animahenasyon 2008: 2nd Philippine Animation Festival.
