= Avid Liongoren =

Filipino filmmaker and animator

- Born: David Crisologo Liongoren; 14 November 1979 (age 46); Quezon City, Philippines
- Education: UP Diliman
- Occupations: Film director; screenwriter; producer; animator
- Years active: 1997–present

David Crisologo Liongoren (born November 14, 1979), known professionally as Avid Liongoren, is a Filipino filmmaker and animator. He is best known for adult animated features including Saving Sally (2016) and Hayop Ka! (2020).

A prominent figure of the Philippine advertising industry in the 21st century, his works are created mostly television commercials and music videos, almost all employed with traditional animation, for major television channels and networks.

== Early life ==
Avid was born in Quezon City, National Capital Region, Philippines on November 14, 1979, to abstract artist Alfredo Aritcheta Liongoren and gallerist Norma Crisologo. Avid is the eldest son of Alfredo and Norma, and is the eldest brother of siblings Erik and Hannah, both were also artists.

== Filmography ==
=== Feature films ===
Year	Title	Director	Writer	Producer	Editor	Ref.
2016	Saving Sally	Yes	Yes	Yes	Yes	
2020	Hayop Ka!	Yes	No	Yes	Yes	
2025	Zsazsa Zaturnnah Vs The Amazonistas Of Planet X	Yes	Yes	Yes	Yes	
2026	Ella Arcangel: Awit ng Pangil at Kuko	No	No	Yes	No	
TBA	Light Lost	Yes	TBA	TBA	TBA	

=== Television series ===
Year	Title	Creator	Director	Writer	Producer	Ref.
2021	Heneral Tuna	No	Yes	No	Yes	

=== Short films ===
Year	Title	Ref
2010	Red Mask	
2010	Robuboy & Pugita	
2015	Muning	
2016	Josephine	
2016	Momo	
2019	Jepoy	
2019	Our Forgotten Friends	
2022	Ella Arcangel	

=== Music videos ===
Year	Title	Ref
2005	Sunday Driving	
2010	Jeepney Love Story	
2011	Time In	
2013	B.A.B.A.Y.	
2013	Chinito	
2013	I Love You Anak	
2013	Stranger	
2013	Tayo	
2014	Paligoyligoy	
2014	Ready ka na ba?	
2015	Mr. Sun	
2016	Label	
