= Sulayman (film) =

- Official film poster
- Directed by: Nelson “Blog” Caliguia
- Written by: Nelson “Blog” Caliguia
- Production companies: Tuldok Animation Studios, Inc.
- Release date: 2023
- Running time: 8 minutes
- Country: Philippines
- Language: Filipino (Tagalog)

Sulayman is a 2023 Philippine animated historical drama action-adventure short film based on the Indarapatra and Sulayman tales of Maguindanao. The film was directed by Nelson “Blog” Caliguia Jr under Tuldok Animated Studios.

== Premise ==
The film revolves around the sacrifices heroes make to save others as the titular warrior uses his skills, compassion and dedication to fight elements that disrupt the peace in his hometown.

== Development ==
Sulayman was funded through the Innovation Grant Program of the Cultural Center of the Philippines, initiated by the CCP Board of Trustees, as a response to the global crisis affecting the creative industry during the height of the COVID-19 pandemic. Caliguia Jr. and his team set their priorities straight and decided to make the animated film as concise and compact without losing the folktale's elements and its cultural significance.

== Awards and recognition ==
Sulayman won the Best Animated Film at the PENSACON Short Film Festival 2024 and Best Animation (Traditional) at the FantaSci Short Film Festival. It also won the "Best Short Film under 10 minutes" at the Norwescon Speculative Film Festival 2025. On top of the awards, the short film has also been a part of more than thirty international film festivals.
