= Animation Council of the Philippines =

The Animation Council of the Philippines, Inc. (ACPI) is a non-profit and non-stock organization in the Philippines that specializes in 2D and 3D animation. As an organization that is recognized and supported by the Government of the Philippines, and as a business engaged in information and communications technology, the goal of the ACPI is to promote the animation industry locally and globally. It aims to create an identity for the Philippines within the animation industry. It has the intention of making the Philippines as one of the preferred countries that provides animation services. It expresses high regard for locally produced animation with original content. It aims to reinvent and present the Philippines as a "center of excellence for animation and content creation services" not only to the Asian clientele but also to countries such as the United States, the United Kingdom, France, and Japan.

== Programs and projects ==
The main project of the ACPI is the Animahenasyon, an annual animation festival and competition in the Philippines that features the works of Filipino animators. Apart from this, ACPI also holds animation classes and training programs, animation congress, and animation exhibits. In relation to the training programs, ACPI is the developer of curriculum for 2D and 3D animation classes, as well as consultancy services. Project-wise, ACPI can provide project or production management services for 2D, 3D, or flash animation projects. Apart from consultancy services, ACPI provides animation curriculum and course development services, training for animation trainers, and career orientation courses. Apart from the Amihenasyon project, ACPI grants the annual Outstanding Emerging Artist in Animation Award for outstanding young and fast-rising cartoonists and animators who are not over the age of 40, including those who are able to contribute, through cartooning and animation, in building Filipino identity, expressing the sense of nationhood, pioneering a mode of creative expression or style that recognizes Filipino handiwork, and propelling the improvement of the local animation industry. Another recognition project sponsored by ACPI is the Animahenasyon's Lifetime Achievement Award, an award granted to notable animators and contributors to the animation industry in the Philippines.

The Animation Council of the Philippines, Inc. serves as a platform for providing member companies to showcase capabilities through activities such as participation in locally and internationally sponsored trade fairs and business matching services. The member companies can also present their portfolio of works through the ACPI's website. ACPI works hand in hand with participating colleges, universities, and other private and public educational institutions in the Philippines, the Technical Education and Skills Development Authority (TESDA), national government agencies, and local government units in order to establish and develop animation as a "lucrative career" for Filipinos, including those that are adapted as introductory courses for children.
