= Roxlee =

Filipino filmmaker

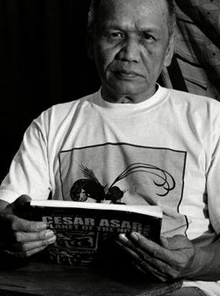
- Born: Roque Lee; August 16, 1950 (age 76); Naga City, Camarines Sur, Philippines
- Education: Naga Elementary School, Ateneo de Naga University, National University, Mowelfund Film Institute
- Occupations: Experimental Filmmaker and animator, cartoonist, painter, musician
- Organization(s): Animagination, Sinekalye, Baybayin Prod.
- Notable work: Green Rocking Chair (2006), Juan Baybayin (2007), and Manila Scream (2016)

Roque Federizon Lee (Roxlee) is a Filipino animator, filmmaker, cartoonist, and painter. Considered by many to be the godfather of young Filipino filmmakers, Roxlee is best known for creating Cesar Asar with his brother, Monlee.

== Biography ==
Lee began as a cartoonist, first contributing cartoons to Jingle Magazine. Shortly after, he created the comic strip Cesar Asar for Manila Bulletin in collaboration with his brother, Monlee, from 1980 to 2000. Lee is one of the founding members of Animagination, which evolved into Animahenasyon and Sinekalye, a group of filmmakers taking films and music into the street. His surreal humor, edgy approach, and originality have been praised by many critics.

In the 1980s, his works were done in super-8 film, divided between hand-drawn works like The Great Smoke and pixelated live-action pieces like Juan Gapang. Although he has not worked in the animation industry, Roxlee’s independent approach to filmmaking has influenced a generation of younger animators, many of whom took up courses at the Mowelfund Film Institute in the 1980s and 1990s. Additionally, he has amassed a cult following in places like Western Europe, Japan, and Singapore.

Lee is also into oil painting and wrote the book Cesar Asar in the Planet of the Noses (2008), a collection of his cartoons and short stories. In 2020, he received a Lifetime Achievement Award from FAMAS, the Philippines' oldest award giving body, in recognition of his pioneering work in alternative cinema and animation.

== Major works and exhibitions ==
- 1989 - "Spit/Optik" Premieres in Berlinale Forum Section with 8 other RP short films
- 1990 - Selection of Roxlee films in "No-Budget Film Festival" in Hamburg, Germany
- 1990 - Retrospective in Hamburg, Germany
- 1992 - Roxlee retrospective at Image Forum (Tokyo's Premier Experimental Film Art House)
- 1992 to 1993 - Fellowship Grant in Tokyo, Japan
- 1994 - Roxlee retrospective at 18th Hong Kong International Film Festival
- 1995 - Roxlee retrospective at Animagination, First Filipino Animation Festival, CCP
- 2004 - Exhibition of over 50 Cartoon Paintings at Singapore International Film Festival
- 2009 - "Green Rocking Chair" in Rotterdam and Singapore International Film Festival
- 2008 - Filipino participant at Busan Bienalle Art Festival
- 2011 - A Twist of the Past for the Present + Heat Studies - University of the Philippines Film Center
- 2012- Along with other Filipino artists at Sharjah Bienalle
- 2019 - RETROX (Roxlee Retrospective) - UPFI Film Center
- 2019 - Kaliskis (Oil Painting Exhibition) - Mono 8 Gallery

== Organizational affiliations and positions ==
- 1978 to 1980 - Cartoonist for Jingle Magazine
- 1995 to 1997 - Cartoonist for 1st Yamagata International Film Festival
- 1980 to 2000 - Comic strip contributor ("Cesar Asar") at Manila Bulletin
- 2001 to 2004 - Executive Committee Member of National Committee on Cinema - NCCA (National Commission for Culture and the Arts)

== Honors and awards ==
- 1982 to 1985 - Annually won at Experimental Cinema of the Phils. (ECP)
- 1986 - Honorable Mention - Experimental Short Film - Kelibia Short Film Festival, Tunisia
- 1987 to 1992 - Annually won at Gawad CCP (Cultural Center of the Phils.' Short Film Contest)
- 1988 - Best Student Film - Film Academy of the Philippines
- 1987 - Juan Gapang - Best Experimental Short Film - Gawad Urian Awards
- 2006 - Daluyan Awardee (progressive leaders and pioneers in the independent film community in the Philippines) - Philippine Independent Filmmakers' Multi-Purpose Cooperative (IFC) and Robinsons Galleria Movieworld
- 2008 - a Tribute at .MOV Digital Film Festival
- 2010 - Lifetime Achievement Award - Animahenasyon - Animation Council of the Philippines Incorporated (ACPI)
- 2016 - Manila Scream (with Blair Camillo and Bob Macabenta ) - Juror's Award for Short Film - Metro Manila Film Festival
- 2020 - Lifetime Achievement Award for Alternative Cinema- FAMAS

== Filmography ==
- 1983 - Tronong Puti (White Throne) - shorts
- 1984 - Tatlong 'A'(Three A's) - animation
- 1984 - The Great Smoke - animation
- 1984 - Tao at Kambing (Man and Goat) - animation
- 1985 - Inserts - animation
- 1985 - ABCD - animation
- 1987 - Lizard, or How to Perform in Front of a Reptile - experimental
- 1987 - Ink - animation
- 1987 - Juan Gapang (Johnny Crawl) - experimental
- 1987 - Prayle (Friars)
- 1988 - Juan Tunog - experimental
- 1989 - Juan Toga - shorts
- 1989 - Pencil
- 1989 - Spit/Optik - animation
- 1989 - Moron's
- 1989 - Moron's Monolog - experimental
- 1990 - Mix 1 & 2 - experimental
- 1993 - Tito's Wedding - shorts
- 1993 - Harajuko - experimental
- 1999 - Cesar Asar - full length film
- 2000 - Juan Gulay - shorts
- 2001 - Nose
- 2001 - Tronong Puti 2 - shorts
- 2003 - Haus of Sing - experimental
- 2004 - Two Birds Hit with one Big Stone - experimental
- 2005 - Batumbuhay (Live Rock) - documentary
- 2005 - Romeo Must Rock - documentary
- 2005 - Ghost of Rocker Janis - experimental shorts
- 2006 - Left Turn (Juan Kaliwa) - animation
- 2006 - 35 MM Man - experimental
- 2006 - La Pula (Red Chief) - shorts
- 2007 - Musika Dong - documentary
- 2007 - Bahay Kubo on Wheels - documentary
- 2008 - Monkey and the Turtle - animation
- 2008 - Green Rocking Chair (Juan Baybayin Story) - creative documentary
- 2017 - Manila Scream - Experimental

== The 12 Commandments of Independent Filmmakers ==
1. Thou shall shoot only original movies with original storyline. Shoot whatever available medium, what is important is the concept.
2. Be resourceful, always look for potential sponsors. Shoot films with limited budget but with unlimited ideas. If possible, thou shall only have a maximum of 2 takes per scene.
3. Thou shall not be blinded by the stars. If you can eliminate the star complex the better.
4. Thou shall not patronize very commercial and trashy movies.
5. Thou shall not limit yourself. Always aim for the international release of your films. Remember, your film can be your passport.
6. Thou shall not be disrespectful of other filmmakers even if they make bad films.
7. Thou shall not be greedy. Share your equipment, film stocks and ideas with other aspiring filmmakers.
8. Thou shall not lose hope even if you have little audience for now, maybe the bigger audience will be the next generation to come.
9. Thou shall not always aspire for financial gain but always strive for cinematic excellence.
10. Thou shall not be bothered by bad reviews of your films. Put in mind there are bad critics everywhere.
11. Thou shall not have the feeling of a great director. Be humble and recognize the existence of the Supreme Being above.
12. Thou shall not lose the passion of making films. Just work and work up to the last breath.
