= Hayop Ka! =

2020 Philippine adult animated film

- Promotional release poster
- Directed by: Avid Liongoren
- Written by: Manny Angeles; Paulle Olivenza
- Story by: Avid Liongoren; Manny Angeles
- Produced by: Avid Liongoren; Manny Angeles; Joyce Bernal; Piolo Pascual; E Del Mundo; Erickson Raymundo
- Starring: Angelica Panganiban; Robin Padilla; Sam Milby
- Edited by: Avid Liongoren; Jether Amar; Manny Angeles
- Music by: Len Calvo
- Production companies: Rocketsheep Studio; Spring Films
- Distributed by: Netflix
- Release date: October 29, 2020
- Running time: 73 minutes
- Country: Philippines
- Languages: Filipino; English

Hayop Ka! (lit. 'You Are an Animal!', a profanity meaning "you animal!" in English), also known as Hayop Ka! (You animal!), Hayop Ka! The Nimfa Dimaano Story, and You Animal!, is a 2020 Philippine adult animated romantic comedy film directed by Avid Liongoren. It features a voice cast topbilled by Angelica Panganiban, Robin Padilla, and Sam Milby. Panganiban voices Nimfa, an anthropomorphic feline who works as a perfume saleswoman and whose boyfriend, a mongrel named Roger (Padilla), is employed as a janitor. When Nimfa meets Iñigo (Milby), a wealthy dog with a career as a high-profile entrepreneur, she finds herself in the middle of a love triangle.

Produced by Rocketsheep Studio and Spring Films, Hayop Ka! was announced as an official selection for main competition at the 2021 Annecy International Animated Film Festival, became the first Philippine animated feature to be selected, and was released on October 29, 2020, on Netflix in select territories.

== Plot ==
In Manila, Nimfa Dimaano visits Manghuhula, an octopus fortune teller who predicts that Nimfa will fall in love with two men at the same time and have wild sex in the future. Nimfa works as a perfume saleswoman at a mall department store, and cohabits with a mongrel named Roger Europeo, a janitor. That night, Nimfa and Roger eat stew at a kiosk that they frequently visit. Roger casually proposes marriage to Nimfa and she declines, noting their lack of money. He suggests that Nimfa, who frequently pays for their rent, stop paying for her sister Linda's school tuition, but she refuses, saying that she does not want her sister to be a dropout like she was.

While at work one day, Nimfa is approached by Iñigo Villanueva, a wealthy, high-profile entrepreneur dog but also a secret sex addict. Nimfa helps Iñigo pick out a luxury perfume as a birthday gift for his mother. Iñigo asks Nimfa out and gives her his business card. After work, Nimfa finds herself irritated by Roger and rejects his sexual advances. At Iñigo's mother's birthday dinner, Iñigo unwraps the present to find a cheap cologne. Iñigo finds Nimfa on social media and messages her about the mistake while she's in bed with Roger. They arrange to meet and have the cologne returned, and Iñigo drives Nimfa home.

For their anniversary, Roger takes Nimfa to the stew kiosk. Nimfa ignores her meal, instead texting flirtatiously with Iñigo; Roger becomes suspicious. Later, Iñigo visits Nimfa at her job to pick up the correct perfume, accompanied by a poodle named Marie. Iñigo senses Nimfa's jealousy and discovers he is in love with both women. Despite this, he texts Nimfa again that night, telling her that Marie is just a friend, and invites her to go on a trip with him the next day. After Iñigo ends the call, he joins Marie for champagne in his hot tub.

The next day, Iñigo brings Nimfa to a lavish seaside property in Batangas, wanting her to be his secretary for the day. Nimfa is enticed by Iñigo. When he insists that she spend the night, she calls her friend, a rabbit named Jhermelyn, and asks her to tell Roger that she is staying with her that night. After dinner, Nimfa walks in on a shrine to Iñigo's most recent girlfriend, Irene, who dumped him after he had an affair with Marie. Nimfa starts to reconsider her feelings towards Iñigo, but after she walks in on him while he's showering, the two become aroused and end up having sex.

The following day, Iñigo flies with Nimfa back to Manila in a helicopter. They visit Iñigo's mother and give her the correct perfume, and Iñigo drives Nimfa back home. Roger angrily confronts Nimfa after hearing the truth from Jhermelyn. Nimfa kicks Roger out of the house, screaming that Roger never contributes to their relationship or lives. The next day, Nimfa arranges to meet Iñigo at the high-rise building where he works. Roger appears and attacks Iñigo's car, believing Iñigo to be inside it, but Iñigo's valet, a frog named Jerry, is the only one in the vehicle. Roger is placed in a prison cell, and Nimfa arranges for him to be released. She then visits Jerry in the hospital.

Nimfa travels to the countryside for an unannounced visit to her sister Linda and their mother. She discovers that Linda has not been going to school at all and has a child with her partner, Ramil. Upset at the lies, Nimfa abandons her family, returns to Batangas with Iñigo, and sleeps with him again. Feeling nauseous the next morning, Nimfa checks in at a hospital and learns that she is nine weeks pregnant. As her affair with Iñigo lasted only three weeks, she realizes that Roger is the baby's father. She visits Jhermelyn and is stunned to see Roger coming out of Jhermelyn's shower. She calls a radio show to talk about her problems, and the show's host makes her rethink her decisions; Nimfa visits Iñigo's building to tell him about her pregnancy. Seeing him making out with Marie, the two women get into a fierce fight, which Nimfa wins. When Iñigo suggests they can share him, she mercilessly knocks him out of a window.

After leaving the building, a recovered Jerry sees Nimfa and takes her to the stew kiosk for a meal, where they share some laughs, giving Nimfa the confidence to move forward. The credits sequence shows Nimfa struggling with making ends meet, giving birth to her illegitimate child, her mother, Linda, and Ramil coming back to support her, and Nimfa opening her own sari-sari store.

== Voice casts ==
Characters	Original voice	Netflix voice	Note
Nimfarella "Nimfa" Dimaano	Angelica Panganiban	Reba Buhr	A Somali cat who works as a perfume salesperson.
Roger Europeo	Robin Padilla	Mick Wingert	A muscular bulldog mix who works as a janitor, and Nimfa's boyfriend.
Iñigo Villanueva	Sam Milby	Todd Haberkorn	A wealthy Siberian Husky with a career as a high-profile entrepreneur, and secretly a womanizer.
Jerry	Empoy Marquez	Kyle McCarley	A frog that works as a valet for Iñigo, who constantly calls him "Larry".
Jhermelyn	Arci Muñoz	Cherami Leigh	A pink rabbit who is Nimfa's best friend.
Linda Dimaano	Yeng Constantino	Cassandra Lee Morris	Nimfa's sister.
Marie	Madeleine Humphries	Tara Sands	A poodle who is Iñigo's assistant and fiancé.
Papa Jorge	Piolo Pascual	Roger Craig Smith	A red ox who is a DJ that gives love advices on his radio show.
Manghuhula	Eugene Domingo	Cissy Jones	An elderly octopus fortune teller.

- Moira Dela Torre as Iñigo's sister. Lee Morris also appear as an uncredited voice of Iñigo's sister
- Joyce Bernal as a blue owl who appears as a doctor that discovers Nimfa's pregnancy in the hospital. Sands also appear as an uncredited voice of an owl.
- Claudia Enriquez as Iñigo's mother. Jones also appear as an uncredited voice of Iñigo's mother.

== Production ==
Hayop Ka! is the first adult animated film produced in the Philippines, according to Liongoren, it was first conceptualized after the production of the film Saving Sally, serving as its "thematic opposite." He also said that it took three years to produce Hayop Ka!, and described it as "light and comical". Avid Liongoren, the director of the animation, stated the hope for creating a "Filipino style when it comes to cartoons" and noted that the Philippines has a huge animation industry "that does work for foreign projects." He also hoped it encourages "more local productions" and work for Pinoy animators.

== Release ==
On September 21, 2020, Netflix announced that the film was to be released on October 29.

== Reception ==
=== Pre-release ===
In September 2020, Hayop Ka! garnered a mixed reception from netizens. Some demanded that Netflix recast Robin Padilla, who voices Roger in the film, due to Padilla's support of Philippines president Rodrigo Duterte; however, others urged the general public to support the film by watching it for the sake of the Filipino animators and filmmakers behind the project.

=== Post-release ===
On Rotten Tomatoes, the film has an approval rating of 88% based on 8 reviews, with an average rating of 6.9/10. Chris Sawin of Hub Pages gave the film 4 out of 5 stars and wrote "Hayop Ka! is this unusual yet entertaining animated film driven by a sexual frenzy with an insatiable appetite. The film is a romantic smorgasbord of lust with a final act that is smashed between a triple cheeseburger of twists."

Oggs Cruz of Rappler received a mixed review and wrote "Hayop Ka! is mostly bark, and barely any bites. It's sure to give those who want their entertainment laced with skin-deep novelty a jolly good time. However, there's hardly anything underneath its bawdiness and boisterous gags."

Goldwin Reviews received a negative review with 1 out of 5 stars, criticizing the story and character development, wrote "The integration of animals and humans for this movie is underwhelming. The representation of each animal species is nothing but the usual and ordinary, losing the opportunity to discuss the inhumane and extraordinary personalities of human in a broader perspective".

=== Awards ===
Award	Date of ceremony	Category	Recipient(s)	Result	Ref.
Annecy International Animation Film Festival	June 19, 2021	Best Feature	Hayop Ka!	Nominated	
FAMAS Awards	December 12, 2021	Best Picture	Hayop Ka!	Nominated	
FAMAS Awards	December 12, 2021	Best Director	Avid Liongoren	Nominated	
FAMAS Awards	December 12, 2021	Best Screenplay	Manny Angeles	Won	
FAMAS Awards	December 12, 2021	Best Editing	Jether Amar, Manny Angeles, Avid Liongoren	Nominated	
FAMAS Awards	December 12, 2021	Best Musical Score	Len Calvo	Nominated	
FAMAS Awards	December 12, 2021	Best Sound	Nicole Amores	Nominated	
Gawad Urian Awards	October 21, 2021	Best Picture	Hayop Ka!	Nominated	
Gawad Urian Awards	October 21, 2021	Best Animation	Hayop Ka!	Won	
Gawad Urian Awards	October 21, 2021	Best Director	Avid Liongoren	Nominated	
Gawad Urian Awards	October 21, 2021	Best Screenplay	Manny Angeles, Paulle Olivenza	Nominated	
Gawad Urian Awards	October 21, 2021	Best Editing	Jether Amar, Manny Angeles	Nominated	
Gawad Urian Awards	October 21, 2021	Best Music	Len Calvo	Nominated	
Gawad Urian Awards	October 21, 2021	Best Sound	Mikko Quizon, John Daryl Libongero, John Michael Perez, Aeriel Ellyzon Mallari	Nominated	
Ursa Major Award	May 1, 2021	Best Anthropomorphic Motion Picture	Hayop Ka!	Nominated	

== See also ==
- Adult animation in the Philippines
- Cinema of the Philippines
- List of Philippine films of 2020
