= Francisco Reyes (illustrator) =

Filipino comic strip artist

Francisco Reyes is a Filipino illustrator and comic strip artist who is regarded as the “King of the Philippine-jungle lord school of comics-strip writing”. He was the co-creator, together with Pedrito Reyes, of Kulafu (1930s), the first colored adventure comic strip in the history of comics and magazines in the Philippines.

== Biography ==
Reyes started studying at the School of Fine Arts of the University of the Philippines in 1927. He graduated in 1932. He began working for Liwayway Publications during the same year. From 1936 to 1941, he was working solo for the comic strip Kulafu because Pedrito Reyes took on another job. Among his other creations were Talahib ["Cogon Grass" or "Bush"] (1946), Kilabot ["Terror", "Fear", or "Horror"] (1947), Buhawi ["Cyclone" or "Tornado"] (1947), and Mahiwagang Sinulid ["Mysterious Thread"] (1949). In collaboration with Filipino writer Clodualdo del Mundo, he illustrated the comic strips Joe Safari (1947), Dagog (1967), Sphinx (1969) and Ogganda (1964).
