= Annie Batungbakal =

1979 romantic comedy film by Maryo J. de los Reyes

- Directed by: Maryo J. de los Reyes
- Written by: Jake Tordesillas
- Based on: Annie Batungbakal by Hotdog
- Produced by: Nora Aunor; Christopher de Leon
- Starring: Nora Aunor; Nida Blanca; Lloyd Samartino; Chicháy; German Moreno; Rez Cortez; Juan Rodrigo; Flora Gasser; Christopher de Leon; Alma Moreno; Rudy Fernandez; Marco Sison; Nestor de Villa; Freddie Aguilar; Ishmael Bernal; Jay Ilagan; Rio Locsin; Mat Ranillo III; Chanda Romero; Victor Wood
- Cinematography: Jose Batac Jr.
- Edited by: Jorrane Gelian Alliyah Yana
- Music by: Hotdog
- Production company: NV Productions
- Distributed by: NV Productions
- Release date: September 14, 1979
- Country: Philippines
- Language: Filipino

Annie Batungbakal is a 1979 Philippine romantic comedy film directed by Maryo J. de los Reyes from a screenplay by Jake Tordesillas. It was loosely based on the 1979 song of the same title by the band Hotdog.

Produced by NV Productions, the film was released theatrically on September 14, 1979.

== Premise ==
Annie Batungbakal lives a humdrum existence working as a record shop saleslady. Day in and out, she reports to work and goes home but all this changes when Hilda took her to the disco one night.

== Cast ==
- Nora Aunor as Annie Batungbakal
- Nida Blanca as Hilda
- Lloyd Samartino
- Chicháy
- German Moreno
- Rez Cortez as Roy
- Juan Rodrigo
- Flora Gasser
- Christopher de Leon
- Alma Moreno
- Rudy Fernandez
- Marco Sison
- Nestor de Villa as Enrico
- Freddie Aguilar
- Ishmael Bernal
- Jay Ilagan
- Rio Locsin
- Mat Ranillo III
- Chanda Romero
- Victor Wood
- Connie Angeles
- Lorli Villanueva
- Marie Grace Santos
- Benggot Pe Benito
- Joey Galvez
- Mia Gutierrez
- Andrew Angeles
- Aida Carmona
- Estrella Antonio
- Ed Finlan
- Anna Marin
- Tina Monasterio
- Bebong Osorio
- Richie

== Production ==
Nonoy Marcelo, who directed the first animated film Tadhana, provided the animation for a seven-minute opening scene in the film, which features the hot dog version of the band.

== Reception ==
The film was described as "a take off from the big 1977 Hollywood disco movie hit, Saturday Night Fever" "recount[ing], in disco beat, the sad story of a girl who hides behind the anonymity of her daytime job as a salesgirl, but who reigns at night as disco queen of Manila's Coco Banana". "Most of the Hotdogs' songs tell about Filipino lifestyles in a fun and humorous way." David Joel notes that it was "Nonoy Marcelo's only mainstream-format animation effort; and some of the best Hotdog music, satirical pop for now people".
