= Ilocos Norte tobacco excise tax funds controversy =

Corruption scandal involving former Governor Imee Marcos, Mark Chua and the Ilocos 6

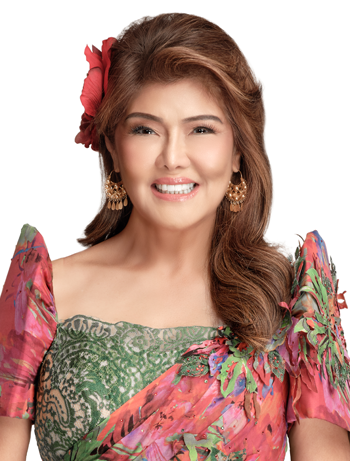
Imee Marcos and her boyfriend, Mark Chua (not pictured), have been linked to the 64.5 million peso scandal.

In May 2017, the House of Representatives of the Philippines began an investigation into alleged misuse of tobacco excise tax funds in the province of Ilocos Norte from 2010 to 2016, representing the first two gubernatorial terms of Imee Marcos, who was serving her third and last gubernatorial term at the time the investigation was initiated. Marcos, her longtime partner Mark Chua, and six Ilocos Norte local officials—Pedro Agcaoili, Eden Batulayan, Josephine Calajete, Encarnacion Gaor, Genedine Jambaro, and Evangeline Tabulog—were implicated in the investigation.

In July 2018 the House Committee on Good Government recommended that charges be filed against the persons implicated, leading the Office of the Ombudsman to initiate its own "fact-finding investigation" to determine whether a formal investigation will be opened.

== Background ==
=== Tobacco dependence in the Ilocos region ===
Ilocos Norte was one of the provinces Spanish colonial Governor-General, José Basco y Vargas placed under the Tobacco monopoly on 1 March 1782. The policy, which effectively forced farmers in Cagayan Valley, the Ilocos provinces, Nueva Ecija and Marinduque to produce only tobacco in order to meet government quotas, stayed in place until 1882. By then, a hundred years under the monopoly had changed the society, culture, and ecology of the Ilocos region so much that the economy of the region has since remained dependent on tobacco farming.

=== Tobacco fund ===
In 1992, president Corazon Aquino signed Republic Act No. 7171 which created a tobacco fund, drawing from 15% of excise taxes from locally manufactured Virginia-type cigarettes in order to support tobacco farmers who are “the nucleus of an industry which generates a sizeable income.” This was further enhanced by president Fidel V. Ramos in 1996 with Republic Act No. 8240, which allotted 15% of excise taxes from burley and native tobacco to provinces that produce them.

The northern Philippine province of Ilocos Norte is one of six provinces designated as beneficiaries of the tobacco fund under Republic Act No. 7171, and continued to be one of the beneficiaries when the list of beneficiary provinces when the list was expanded beyond the Ilocos region provinces by Republic Act No. 8240. (The sixteen beneficiary provinces under RA 8240 are Abra, Kalinga, Mountain Province, Ilocos Norte, Ilocos Sur, La Union, Pangasinan, Cagayan, Isabela, Nueva Vizcaya, Quirino, Tarlac, Occidental Mindoro, Misamis Oriental, Maguindanao, and Cotabato.)

==== Restrictions on the use of tobacco funds ====
The law restricts the use of tobacco funds to specific projects:

- Cooperative projects that would increase productivity, and thus the income of tobacco farmers
- Capital for livelihood projects, which would develop alternative farming systems for farmers
- Agro-industrial projects that would lead to tobacco farmers eventually taking over as owners of tobacco industry processing systems
- Infrastructure projects related to the tobacco industry, such as farm-to-market roads.

=== Prior tobacco fund controversies ===
Misuse of tobacco had become a national political controversies at least twice in the years after RA 7171 and RA 8240 were passed.

- In 2000 during the Impeachment process against Joseph Estrada, former Ilocos Norte governor Chavit Singson alleged that Estrada took PHP130 million out of the province's PHP200 million tobacco share of the tobacco fund.
- In 2009, the Commission on Audit of the Philippines found that local officials in Ilocos Sur had "misused, misappropriated, or failed to account for at least P1.3 billion of the tobacco fund", further noting that the projects built using the funds were not within the categories allowed by the law.

== House Resolution No. 882 ==
On 2 March 2017, House Majority Leader Rodolfo Fariñas, along with Pampanga representatives Aurelio Gonzales Jr. and Juan Pablo Bondoc, filed House Resolution No. 882, which requested the House Committee on Good Government to "conduct an inquiry" about the misuse of PHP66.45 million from Ilocos Norte's share of excise tax funds to obtain more than 110 units of motor vehicles. The resolution cited that the "highly irregular purchase" violated 2 republic acts—RA No. 7171, "An Act to Promote the Development of the Farmer in the Virginia Tobacco Producing Provinces," and RA No. 9184, "Government Procurement Reform Act --and 1 presidential decree: PD No. 1445, Government Auditing Code of the Philippines. The investigation began on 2 May 2017, but later experienced delays due to missing documents and the failure of Imee Marcos and other Ilocos local officials to attend the first two hearings.

Fariñas filed the house resolution after discovering three checks indicating the following transactions through cash advances:

1. Check dated 1 December 2011 as PHP18,600,000 cash advance for 40 units of mini-cab
2. Check dated 25 May 2012 as PHP15,300,000 cash advance for second-hand 5 units of buses
3. Check dated 12 September 2012 as PHP32,550,000 cash advance for 70 units of Foton mini-truck

The vehicles were said to be for distribution to the different baranggays and municipalities. In a letter she wrote to the House committee, Marcos justified the purchase as a response to the multiple requests of farmers asking for vehicles, although Fariñas had pointed out that RA 7171 does not include purchasing vehicles as a means to utilize the excise tax. He also pointed out that a baranggay captain from Laoag City received vehicles, despite the fact that there are no tobacco farms in that area. Other baranggay captains have also complained that the vehicles were not duly registered under the Land Transportation Office (LTO), or filed as government property, so costs for oil and gas could not be reimbursed by the baranggay budget.

Aside from the aforementioned checks, three other signed ordinances indicated that large shares of Ilocos Norte's tobacco excise tax were "set aside" for Marcos' pet project known as "Programang Ikauunlad ng Mamamayan Ekonomiya at Ekolohiya" (P-IMEE)." In 2011, PHP57,500,000 was allocated for P-IMEE, and separate amounts of PHP78,600,000 and PHP78,000,000 in 2013 alone, totaling in a massive PHP213,000,000.

On 29 May 2017, six local officials were detained by the House committee, after they refused to answer questions during the hearing, and invoked their right against self-incrimination. The officials were Pedro Agcaoili, Eden Batulayan, Josephine Calajete, Encarnacion Gaor, Genedine Jambaro, and Evangeline Tabulog. They claimed not remembering any of the aforementioned transactions. They were released on 24 July 2018, after confessing that they indeed had access to tobacco excise tax funds used to pay 70 mini trucks. They also acknowledged that it was their signatures written on pertinent documents, a fact that they had previously denied. Marcos also admitted that the said mini trucks were bought from a direct contractor, and was not up for public bidding, as was the protocol when government property is procured.

Upon continued investigation and hearings, the House committee discovered more anomalies, one of which was that all the purchased vehicles "were overpriced by PHP21,450,000." The direct contractor who sold 40 minicab units was identified as Mark Chua, who is also currently Marcos' boyfriend. Records showed that although Chua initially bought each unit for PHP270,000, he sold the mini cabs to the government for PHP485,000, the overprice amounting to PHP7,800,000 overall. The committee also verified the complaints from barangay captains that the vehicles were not registered with the Land Transportation Office.

Committee Report No. 638 therefore concluded and recommended that charges be filed against Marcos, Chua, and several local officials. As of July 2018, another "fact-finding investigation" initiated by the Office of the Ombudsman is underway. If they find enough cause, the Ombudsman will then open a formal investigation.

== Accused ==
Imee Marcos is the eldest daughter of former President of the Philippines Ferdinand Marcos and former First Lady Imelda Marcos. After the death of her father and the family's return from exile, Marcos returned to Philippine politics, serving as Congresswoman to the 2nd district of Ilocos Norte from 1998 to 2007. She then ran and was elected Ilocos Norte governor in 2010. Her third and final gubernatorial term ended in 2019.

== See also ==
- Imee Marcos
- List of political scandals in the Philippines
