= Philippine Senate Committee on Cooperatives =

Standing committee of the Senate of the Philippines

Committee on Cooperatives
- Senate of the Philippines; 20th Congress

History
- New session started: July 28, 2025

Leadership
- Chair: vacant since May 11, 2026
- Seats: 11

The Philippine Senate Committee on Cooperatives is a standing committee of the Senate of the Philippines.

== Jurisdiction ==
According to the Rules of the Senate, the committee handles all matters relating to:

- Cooperatives, both urban- and rural-based, including but not limited to farm credit and farm security, cooperative movements, and marketing and consumers' organizations
- Implementation of Republic Act No. 9520 or the Cooperative Code of the Philippines

== Members, 20th Congress ==
Based on the Rules of the Senate, the Senate Committee on Cooperatives has 11 members.

As of May 11, 2026
Majority	Minority
Vacant

Ex officio members:

- Senate President pro tempore Loren Legarda
- Acting Majority Floor Leader Joel Villanueva
- Minority Floor Leader Tito Sotto

Committee secretary: Mary Ann Salada

== Historical membership rosters ==
=== 20th Congress ===
September 10, 2025 – May 11, 2026
Majority	Minority
Lito Lapid (NPC), Chair	Imee Marcos (Nacionalista), Vice Chair
Risa Hontiveros (Akbayan), Vice Chair and Deputy Majority Leader	Rodante Marcoleta (Independent), Deputy Minority Leader
JV Ejercito (NPC), Deputy Majority Leader	Joel Villanueva (Independent), Deputy Minority Leader
Bam Aquino (KANP)	Bong Go (PDP)
Pia Cayetano (Nacionalista)	
Win Gatchalian (NPC)	
Kiko Pangilinan (Liberal)	

Ex officio members:

- Senate President pro tempore Panfilo Lacson
- Majority Floor Leader Juan Miguel Zubiri
- Minority Floor Leader Alan Peter Cayetano

Committee secretary: Mary Ann Salada

=== 19th Congress ===
until June 30, 2025
Majority	Minority
Imee Marcos (Nacionalista), Chair	Risa Hontiveros (Akbayan), Deputy Minority Leader
Robin Padilla (PDP), Vice Chair	
JV Ejercito (NPC), Deputy Majority Leader	
Mark Villar (Nacionalista), Deputy Majority Leader	
Nancy Binay (UNA)	
Ronald dela Rosa (PDP)	
Bong Go (PDP)	
Bong Revilla (Lakas)	
Cynthia Villar (Nacionalista)	
Juan Miguel Zubiri (Independent)	

Ex officio members:

- Senate President pro tempore Loren Legarda (July 25, 2022 – May 20, 2024)
- Senate President pro tempore Jinggoy Estrada (May 20, 2024 – June 30, 2025)
- Majority Floor Leader Joel Villanueva (July 25, 2022 – May 20, 2024)
- Majority Floor Leader Francis Tolentino (May 20, 2024 – June 30, 2025)
- Minority Floor Leader Koko Pimentel

Committee secretary: Jingle Concon-Allam

=== 18th Congress ===
until June 30, 2022
Majority	Minority
Juan Miguel Zubiri (Independent), Chair (Note: Ex officio member as Senate majority leader; not counted in the membership.)	Risa Hontiveros (Akbayan), Vice Chair
Win Gatchalian (NPC)	Kiko Pangilinan (Liberal)
Cynthia Villar (Nacionalista)	
Cynthia Villar (Nacionalista)	
Bong Go (PDP–Laban)	
Francis Tolentino (PDP–Laban)	
Lito Lapid (NPC)	
Richard Gordon (Bagumbayan)	

Ex officio members:

- Senate President pro tempore Ralph Recto
- Majority Floor Leader Juan Miguel Zubiri
- Minority Floor Leader Franklin Drilon

Committee secretary: Jingle Concon-Allam

== See also ==
- List of Philippine Senate committees
