= Imee Marcos =

Senator of the Philippines since 2019 (born 1955)

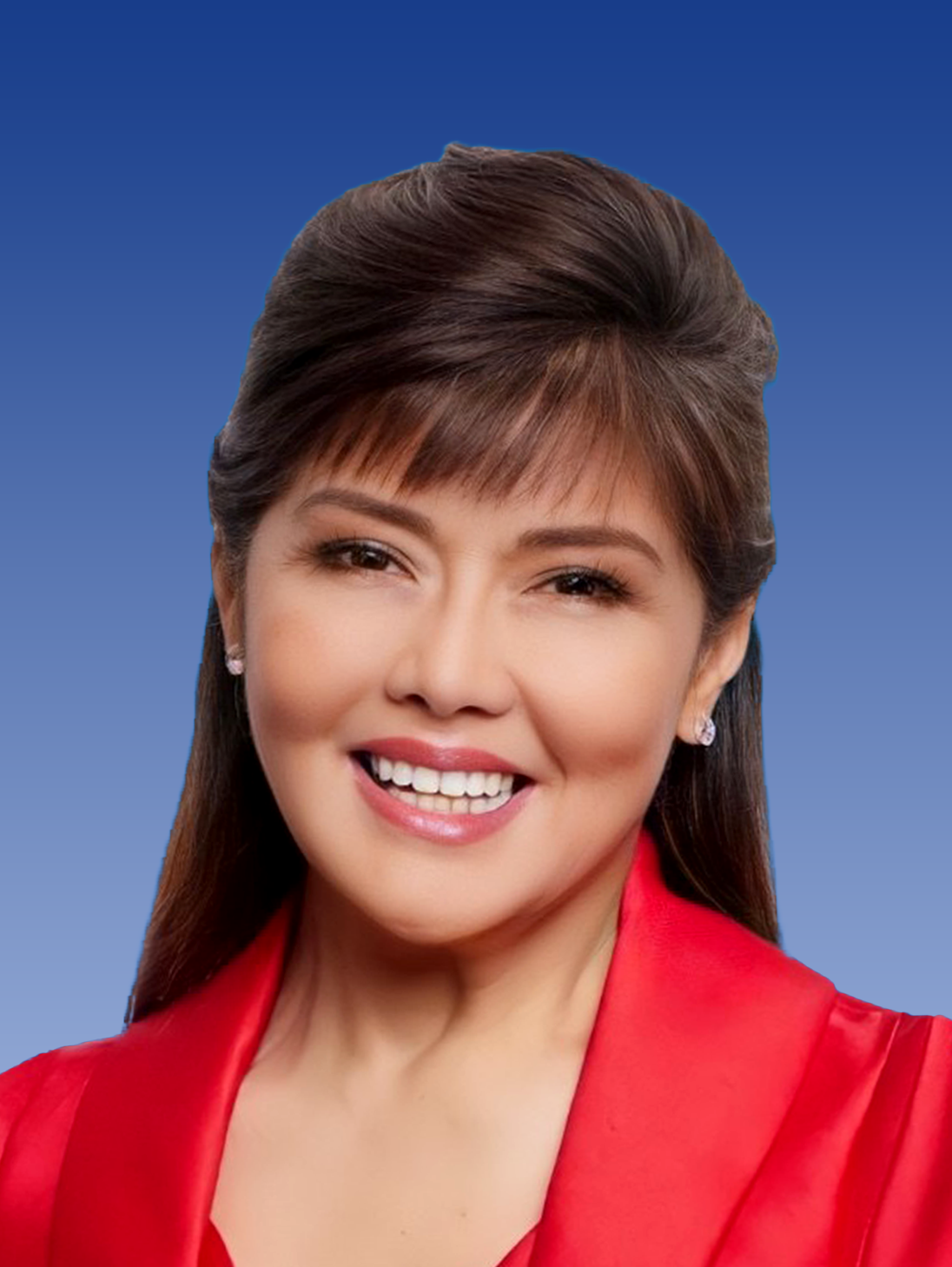

Senate Deputy Minority Leader
- Incumbent
- Assumed office July 29, 2026
- Leader: Alan Peter Cayetano
- Preceded by: Joel Villanueva

Senator of the Philippines
- Incumbent
- Assumed office June 30, 2019
Committee positions
Chair of the Senate Cooperatives Committee
Incumbent
Assumed office July 29, 2026
Preceded by	Lito Lapid
In office July 26, 2022 – September 10, 2025
Preceded by	Juan Miguel Zubiri
Succeeded by	Lito Lapid
Chair of the Senate Foreign Relations Committee
In office May 20, 2026 – June 3, 2026
Preceded by	Erwin Tulfo
Succeeded by	Juan Miguel Zubiri
In office July 26, 2022 – September 10, 2025
Preceded by	Koko Pimentel
Succeeded by	Erwin Tulfo

26th Governor of Ilocos Norte
- In office June 30, 2010 – June 30, 2019
- Vice Governor: Angelo Barba
- Preceded by: Michael Marcos Keon
- Succeeded by: Matthew Manotoc

Member of the House of Representatives from Ilocos Norte's 2nd district
- In office June 30, 1998 – June 30, 2007
- Preceded by: Simeon Valdez
- Succeeded by: Bongbong Marcos

Member of the Regular Batasang Pambansa from Ilocos Norte
- In office July 23, 1984 – March 25, 1986
- Constituency: at-large district

Personal details
- Born: Maria Imelda Josefa Remedios Romualdez Marcos; November 12, 1955 (age 71) Mandaluyong, Rizal, Philippines
- Party: Nacionalista (since 2009)
- Other political affiliations: Kilusang Bagong Lipunan (1980–2009)
- Spouse: Tommy Manotoc (m. 1981; sep. 1990)
- Children: 3, including Matthew
- Parents: Ferdinand Marcos; Imelda Marcos
- Relatives: Marcos family Romualdez family
- Education: Princeton University (dropped out); University of the Philippines Diliman (no degree)

Maria Imelda Josefa Remedios "Imee" Romualdez Marcos-Manotoc (locally [ˈaɪmi ˈmaɾkɔs]; born November 12, 1955) is a Filipino politician, film producer, and film actress serving as a senator since 2019. She previously served as governor of Ilocos Norte from 2010 to 2019 and as the representative of Ilocos Norte's 2nd district from 1998 to 2007. She is a daughter of dictator and president Ferdinand Marcos and convicted former first lady Imelda Marcos, and the older sister of the current president, Bongbong Marcos.

Imee Marcos' political career began during her father's martial law regime, becoming chairperson of the Kabataang Barangay (KB) Foundation in 1977 and a member of the Batasang Pambansa in 1984. It was during her KB term that activist Archimedes Trajano was abducted, tortured, and murdered in 1977 shortly after publicly questioning her appointment to the office. With her interest in media, she produced various film projects such as Nonoy Marcelo-directed propaganda films: the 1977 documentary Da Real Makoy and the 1978 television film Tadhana, the first Philippine animated feature film; she helped establish the Metro Manila Popular Music Festival in 1978, and was made director general of the Experimental Cinema of the Philippines in 1982. After her family was ousted from power in the People Power Revolution of 1986, she and her husband Tommy Manotoc were exiled in Morocco.

After the death of Ferdinand Marcos in 1989, President Corazon Aquino allowed the Marcoses to return to the Philippines in 1991. Imee ran for political office in 1998, and won three terms in the House of Representatives and three terms as governor of Ilocos Norte. She was elected to the Senate in the 2019 elections for a six-year term. She ran for re-election in the 2025 midterm elections, and won placing 12th, securing a second term.

Imee Marcos's conviction in the 1993 Trajano v. Marcos case (978 F 2d 493) before the U.S. district court in Honolulu is noted in U.S. legal circles for exposing the weaknesses of the act of state doctrine, allowing for similar suits to be filed.

She has been linked to the stolen wealth of her family, identified as a beneficiary of various Marcos offshore holdings as revealed in the Panama Papers and the findings in the court convictions of her mother Imelda Marcos. These holdings were defined as "ill-gotten wealth" by the Supreme Court of the Philippines, and are the subject of repatriation efforts by the Presidential Commission on Good Government. Amidst the growing rift between the Marcos and Duterte families during her brother Bongbong's administration, she has frequently sided with the Dutertes and their allies.

== Early life ==
Imee Marcos was born Maria Imelda Josefa Remedios Romualdez Marcos on the morning of November 12, 1955 at Our Lady of Lourdes Hospital in Mandaluyong (then a municipality in Rizal) to Imelda and Ferdinand Marcos. She has three other siblings: Ferdinand "Bongbong" Marcos Jr., the current president; Irene Marcos-Araneta; and Aimee Marcos, who was adopted.

She turned ten years old the day afterwards her father was elected in 1965. In an interview with her family-backed Filipinas Magazine in 1999, she admitted that she was uncomfortable living in the palace because it was too confining, very formal, and fixed. She also added that it is "not necessarily the most appropriate place to bring up a kid but it was quite nice".

While residing at the palace, Marcos asserted that she attended 'regular' schools in Manila. However, she had to discontinue her education due to the challenges faced by the First Family in going out caused by protest rallies outside Malacañang. These rallies, met with military assaults resulting in numerous Filipino deaths, were a response to her family's enduring conjugal dictatorship that spanned over two decades.

== Education ==
During the 2019 elections, Marcos's educational background has been steeped in controversy. Under her parents' conjugal dictatorship, Marcos graduated from at least four schools (including three universities), she graduated as "Cum Laude" and "class valedictorian" in two public occasions.

=== Primary and secondary education ===
- Marcos attended the Institucion Teresiana (now Saint Pedro Poveda College) in Quezon City from Kindergarten through Grade 4 where she earned first honors.
- She transferred to the Convent of Our Lady of Assumption at Herran Street in Manila for Grade 5 to first year high school, where she also earned first honors.
- Marcos later transferred to the "American School" (now International School Manila) in Makati.

==== Falsification of Santa Catalina high school graduation ====
Marcos claimed that she graduated as class valedictorian from Santa Catalina Convent (now called Santa Catalina School) in Monterey, California.

On 21 March 2019, the assistant head of the Santa Catalina school, John Aimé, stated the following: "'(Imee Marcos) attended our school for a brief period in the fall of 1972 — she is not a graduate".

=== Undergraduate education ===
In 1973, Imee Marcos enrolled at Princeton University, where she took a variety of courses in religion and politics though she did not declare an academic major.

Marcos's stay at Princeton was marred with controversy with black and Asian students (Asian-American Students Association - AASA) protesting her admission for allowing the daughter of a dictator to study at the university and as a potential threat to students who opposed the Marcos regime.

- She withdrew from Princeton in 1976, returned in 1977, and then withdrew for the last time in 1979. She did not receive any degree from Princeton University.
- According to a Princeton alumnus Richard Klein in the August 1983 issue of Town Topics, Marcos had flunked out.

In the book Some Are Smarter Than Others, author Ricardo Manapat reveals that after the EDSA revolution, investigators from the Presidential Commission on Good Government found out that Marcos's tuition, US$10,000 monthly allowance, and the 18th-century estate she stayed in while studying at Princeton was paid for using taxpayer money that could be traced partly to the intelligence funds of the Office of the President, and partly to some of the 15 bank accounts that the Marcoses had secretly opened in the US under assumed names.

==== Falsified claims of graduation from Princeton University ====
Imee Marcos's time as a student at Princeton became a public issue once again in 2018, when she filed her candidacy for the Philippine Senate in the 2019 elections.

Marcos claimed in numerous venues, including a campaign leaflet and her official website, that she had graduated from Princeton. This resulted in social media uproar which brought up old news articles to show that Imee Marcos had not.

On her campaign website, Marcos uploaded an official biography that claimed that she was "one of the first female graduates from an Ivy League School—Princeton University, graduating with honors," but this claim was quickly disproved by news reports and on social media. In addition, she had stated in her curriculum vitae during her stay in the House of Representatives that she had graduated with honors from Princeton with an "Independent Major in Religion and Politics".

In a later interview with news anchor Tina Marasigan on DZMM TeleRadyo, she was asked whether she really graduated from Princeton or not, and whether her status as a Princeton graduate could be proven. She evaded the question and answered:

Yes, correct: it really is the season -- it's election season even though it hasn't been declared by COMELEC. This was also done to Bongbong and to others we know. My record speaks for itself. I think, performance-wise, we can see that we know what we are doing and we were able to help many. Most of all, we have many solutions that can help the multitude. I believe that this is the first generation in which we can really end hunger and poverty. The science is already there for agriculture, the medicine is also there so that no one will die from infections and other diseases. So we really have no excuse. There is also big data and technology so we can monitor each and every poor person in the Philippines. Let us end poverty in this decade.

The ABS-CBN News network noted that the video went viral as Marcos opted not to answer the question. This was seconded by InterAksyon, pointing out that Marcos "avoided answering the question and instead diverted the topic to the scholastic records of her brother Bongbong Marcos."

- In January 2019, the deputy spokesperson of Princeton university, Michael Hotchkiss, stated that their university records "do not show that Ms Marcos was awarded a degree."
- On 26 February 2019, the student newspaper of Princeton, The Daily Princetonian, reported that Marcos falsely claims that she graduated from the university. In an e-mail message to The Daily Princetonian, Hotchkiss repeated the statement: "Our records do not show that Ms. Marcos was awarded a degree."

=== Time at the University of the Philippines, College of Law ===
After her stay at Princeton, she then enrolled at the University of the Philippines College of Law on 1979 as a day student, originally part of batch 1983. Accordingly, her admission was controversial because the student body protested the fact that she had failed to meet the normal requirement of having a college degree, while they had to go through a stringent admissions process.

- According to University of the Philippines Cebu, Professor Madrileña de la Cerna, Marcos did not take 35 units worth of courses at the College of Law by the time she was supposed to graduate. Despite the missing units, the college faced political pressure to allow her to graduate, but the faculty, led by Ms. Haydee Yorac, refused to approve her graduation.

==== Staged ceremony, mock graduation and honorary claims ====
A few days after the University of the Philippines held its recognition ceremonies for 1983, a televised recognition ceremony held at the Meralco Theater showed Imee Marcos graduating, and being honored magna cum laude even though she had not actually graduated. The ceremony was pushed by her parents, Ferdinand and Imelda Marcos, who ruled the Philippines under their conjugal dictatorship.

In the book Some Are Smarter Than Others published in 1991 and written by Ricardo Manapat, the author detailed, "It appeared that Imee never had the proper qualification to enter the school and that her name never appeared in the list of approved graduates nor among the candidates endorsed for graduation by a committee."

Marcos claimed in her curriculum vitae during her time at the House of Representatives that she graduated with a bachelor's degree from the UP College of Law. She also claimed that she graduated magna cum laude.

- The Executive Vice President of University of the Philippines, Teodoro Herbosa, declared: "There is no record of her graduation from UP nor any honors or academic distinctions received with the University Registrar's office".

A viral Facebook post later circulated in the social platform, claiming that Imee graduated from the University of the Philippines in 1983 as class valedictorian. The post included an alleged yearbook, which had Marcos in it. The yearbook's authenticity was later proven to be false, as Marcos did not appear in any authenticated UP yearbook from 1983. Coincidentally, Marcos's eldest son Borgy was also born in 1983, making it impossible for Marcos to graduate from UP Law on time.

According to former UP Law dean Froilan Bacungan in the book The Turning Point: Twenty-six accounts of February events in the Philippines:

"There was indeed some kind of a ceremony held which looked as if she graduated. I was there. It was a little bit PR that, strictly speaking, we should not have participated in. It borders in fact on a little bit of misrepresentation. No less than the Chief Justice of the Supreme Court graced the occasion...

...I allowed her to enter the College of Law in spite of the fact that she couldn't present a certificate proving that she had a bachelor's degree which was the basic requirement...

Imee had sounded very confident that she would submit the certificate. Maybe she was not telling the truth --- how can I know? Four years afterwards, when she could be considered for graduation, we discovered that she never submitted her [undergraduate] diploma. She was not given a bachelor of law degree and that meant she could not take the bar examination".

=== Falsification of Master in Management degree ===
The Asian Institute of Management refused to provide any public information on whether Marcos was enrolled or had graduated from their school, as Marcos has claimed through her government resume that she also earned a "MA Management and Business Administration (MA MBA)" from the school.

- On 22 March 2019, the Registrar and Student Enterprise Director of the school, Bryan Magbutay, officially declared the following: "In our fifty years of providing world class programs, we never offered an MA—MBA".

== Career under the Marcos administration ==
=== Declaration of martial law ===
Marcos and her siblings (Ferdinand Jr. and Irene) were studying overseas before Marcos signed Proclamation No. 1081 on September 21, 1972. The siblings stayed there until they ended their studies, but would come home for Christmas and summer holidays She turned 18 - the Philippines' age of majority, fourteen months after the declaration of Martial Law, and played various political roles in the Martial Law administration - as chairperson of the Kabataang Barangay and as assemblyman to the Batasang Pambansa. She was already 30 when the People Power revolution finally deposed the Marcos administration in 1986.

=== Administrative and political roles ===
Position	Organization	Date
Chairperson	Kabataang Barangay Foundation	1977–1986
Chairperson	Popular Music Foundation of the Philippines	1978–1986
Director general	Experimental Cinema of the Philippines	1982–1985
Chairperson	Friends of the National Museum	1982–1986
Head	Banahaw Broadcasting Corporation	1984–1986
Assemblywoman	Batasang Pambansa	1984–1986

==== Kabataang Barangay Foundation ====
After returning from Princeton, Marcos entered the world of politics as chairperson of the Kabataang Barangay Foundation in September 1977. On the same day she became chairperson, student Archimedes Trajano of Mapúa Institute of Technology was found brutally murdered after questioning her appointment at his school's open forum the day prior. She would later be convicted on the torture and killing of Trajano in later life.

==== Assemblyman for Ilocos Norte to the Batasang Pambansa ====
On June 30, 1984, she won a seat as one of two assemblyman to the Batasang Pambansa for Ilocos Norte (the other assemblyman was Antonio V. Raquiza) under the wing of her father's dictatorship. She formally held this role until the Batasang Pambansa was dissolved in the aftermath of the 1986 EDSA Revolution, which ousted their family from power.

==== National Media Production Center and Experimental Cinema of the Philippines ====
From 1979 to 1986, she was consultant to the minister of the National Media Production Center in Quezon City. From 1982 to 1985, she was director general of the Experimental Cinema of the Philippines (ECP) after recommendation from her parents, who were controlling the country through a conjugal dictatorship. She served as co-producer of the films The Boatman, Brutal, and Scorpio Nights, but was not listed as producer or co-producer of other ECP films.

In a 2002 interview with Philippine cinema academician Joel David, Marcos confirmed that she had "half-jokingly" named the "Experimental Cinema of the Philippines" as a reference to Centro Sperimentale di Cinematografia, the institution founded during the dictatorship of Benito Mussolini - a reference to a cinema institution put up under a prior dictatorship which Professor David surmised to also be a tease aimed at Imee's parents.

As the mid-1980s approached, the collapse of the Philippine economy forced government to reduce the budget of the ECP, and to raise funds, it began screening what critics deemed skin flicks, which were called "Bomba" or "Bold" films in the local slang. At around this time, Imee Marcos promoted Johnny Litton, who had been deputy director general to chief executive officer of the ECP under her, and Litton's decision to screen extremely explicit films such as Scorpio Nights (Regal Films), Company Of Women (Athena Productions, Inc.) and Hubo (lit. "Naked" FLT Films International) were scored by industry critics. By 1985 ECP was producing "about twenty sexually explicit quickies" which they hoped to screen at the three screening rooms of the National Film Center. The films were assured of a neat profit despite the few screening venues.

==== Unexplained Marcos wealth ====
The Marcoses got much criticism during the last part of Ferdinand Marcos's reign because of their conspicuous spending, which was far beyond their legal means, as expressed in the Ferdinand and Imelda Marcos's legally-required Statements of Assets Liabilities and Net Worth (SALN).

Some of the specific things Imee Marcos enjoyed were her own "Marcos Mansions" in Baguio and in the Metro Manila area, and her own purchases of Marcos jewels just like her mother.

In one instance recounted by British journalist Caroline Kennedy, Imee Marcos effectively used Philippine Airlines flights as a courier for breastmilk when she was traveling in Europe but had left her child in the Philippines. According to Kennedy, Imee had explained that she "expressed her milk every day and then Daddy sent a Philippine Airlines plane to wherever she was and it would bring the milk back." Kennedy noted that this coincided with a time when many Europe-based Philippine expats complained of a lot of flight delays and cancellations.

All this was aside from the uber-VIP treatment that the Marcoses regularly received. For example, when Imee Marcos enrolled in the University of the Philippines, the university broke its own policy of not having airconditioned classrooms and made sure the lecture halls Imee had classes in were equipped with AC.

=== Other roles before the 1986 revolution ===
==== Other media work ====
From 1975 to 1986, Marcos produced the television shows Kulit Bulilit and Kaluskos Musmos. She was also a consultant/writer of the Children's Television Workshop for Asia and New York (1977–1979). She also collaborated as a producer with cartoonists José Zabala-Santos and his nephew Nonoy Marcelo to work for the first-ever Philippine full-length animated film titled Tadhana ("Destiny"), which originally conceived as a television pilot, premiered on Philippine television during the anniversary of Martial law in 1978.

Marcos was once a columnist of Manila Bulletin (then known as Bulletin Today) in Manila, publisher of the Filipino Film Review, publisher and editor of the Kabataang Barangay Foundation, Makati, Metro Manila, and special consultant to the chairperson of the board of BBC-2, RPN 9, and IBC 13. She was also the producer of Metro Magazine (1975–1986).

== Torture and murder of Archimedes Trajano ==
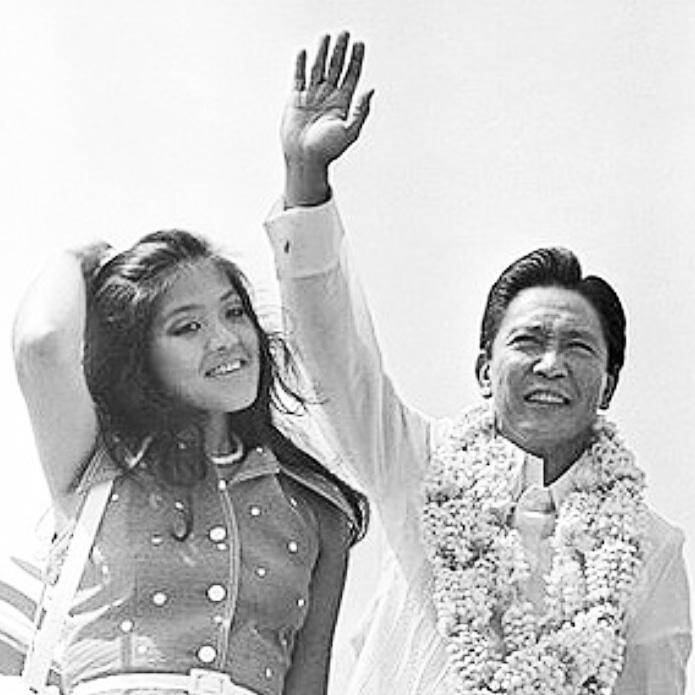
Imee Marcos being supported by her father, Ferdinand Marcos.

The torture and killing of Archimedes Trajano was attributed to Imee Marcos, then the National Chairman of the Kabataang Barangay. "On August 31, 1977, Archimedes Trajano, a 21-year-old student of Mapua Institute of Technology, attended an open forum with Imee Marcos, 21-year-old daughter of the dictator. Her father had appointed her National Chairman of the Kabataang Barangay youth organization. When Trajano questioned her about her appointment, Imee apparently became irritated. Her guards seized Trajano and dragged him away. His body was found hours later, and it has severe bruises, wounds and lifeless: he had been severely tortured and beaten to death."

Nine years after the killing of Archimedes Trajano, his mother, Agapita Trajano, pressed charges against Imee Marcos and her accomplices for "false imprisonment, kidnapping, wrongful death, and a deprivation of rights" of her son. Marcos and her lawyers did not deny that Trajano was tortured—instead, they argued that as agents of the state, the soldiers who killed Trajano were immune from suit in a foreign state. The Honolulu district court awarded $2.5 million in punitive damages, $1.25 million for mental anguish to Agapita Trajano and $246,966 in attorney's fees and costs against Imee Marcos for the murder of Archimedes Trajano, by Marcos's personal bodyguards. Imee Marcos responded by saying, "Yes, Archimedes Trajano was tortured and killed but it's none of your business."

== 1986 ouster and life in exile ==
Increasing unrest springing from the economic collapse of the Philippines in the years after the assassination of Senator Benigno Aquino in 1983 came to a head in February 1986, when the EDSA Revolution succeeded in unseating the Marcoses from Malacañang palace.

Fearful of a scenario in which Marcos's presence in the Philippines would lead to a civil war, the Reagan administration flew Marcos and a party of about 80 individuals - the extended Marcos family and a number of close associates - from the Philippines to Hawaii despite Marcos's objections. Imee and her family were on the flight with her parents.

The exiles stayed at Hickam Air Force Base at the expense of the US Government. A month later, they moved into a pair of residences in Makiki Heights, Honolulu, which were registered to Antonio Floirendo and Bienvenido and Gliceria Tantoco.

Marcos would eventually die in exile in 1989.

President Corazon Aquino eventually allowed the Marcoses, including Imee, to return to the Philippines in order to face various charges. News reports from the period record that Marcos supporters organized a crowd from Manila's slums to welcome the Marcoses on their return.

== Post-exile career ==
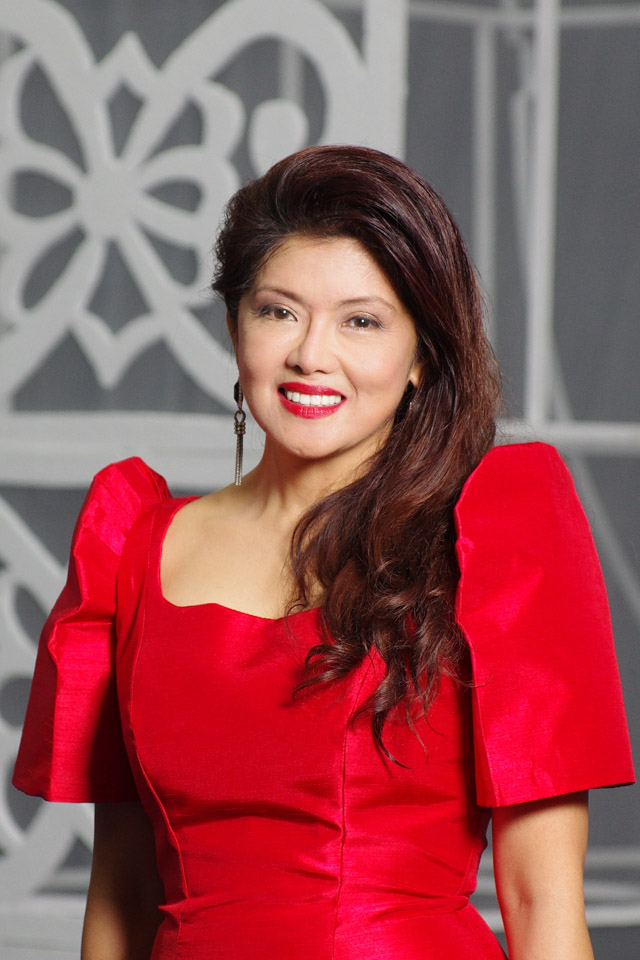
Imee Marcos in August 2013

=== Return to politics ===
Twelve years after her family's exile, Marcos returned to politics. She ran as Congresswoman of the 2nd District of Ilocos Norte and won. She assumed office on June 30, 1998. She was then reelected in 2001 and 2004. Her term ended on June 30, 2007.

In the 2010 elections, she ran as governor of Ilocos Norte against her cousin, Michael Marcos Keon, who was the governor during that time. She defeated her cousin in the elections. Imee had 196,160 votes while Keon had 86,005 votes. She assumed office on June 30, 2010. She was re-elected in 2013, unopposed. She was reelected in the 2016 elections, securing a third consecutive and final term.

During the third Sulong Pilipinas Convention in 2016, President Rodrigo Duterte named Imee as one of his campaign contributors, saying that she borrowed money to fund his campaign. However, Duterte's Statement of Contributions and Expenditures (SOCE) does not include her as a donor. Imee denied the claim saying that she just helped him get votes from the Ilocos Region.

On January 25, 2019, Marcos tweeted that Ilocos Norte's poverty incidence rate lessened under her governorship; however, the very same tweet showed poverty incidence rate actually increased during her rule. Poverty reduction rate was 17% in 2006, while it dropped to 5% in 2015. The tweet was afterwards deleted.

=== Establishment of the Marcos political dynasty ===
Imee Marcos's entrance into politics, beginning with her term as congresswoman of the 2nd District of Ilocos Norte in 1998, saw her taking over the position previously held by her brother, Bongbong Marcos, who became governor of Ilocos Norte that same year. In the context of their mother Imelda Marcos's similar return to politics as congresswoman in Leyte in 1995, journalists and academics noted that the Marcoses had cemented a political dynasty after their return from exile, despite the explicit anti-dynasty provision in Article II Section 26 of the 1987 Constitution of the Philippines.

Saying that this was a common occurrence because of the way Philippine society is structured, Imee Marcos asserted in a November 2012 interview with the Sydney Morning Herald that:

"It's pretty feudal in the Philippines still, even though we like to fool ourselves."

Political scientist Ramon Casiple, in an interview with the South China Morning Post, noted:

"The Marcos support through the years is based on their maintaining the Marcos loyalists, largesse to Ilocos Norte bailiwick, and cultivating the myth of a golden era during the Marcos regime."

=== Renegade and establishment of CREAM ===
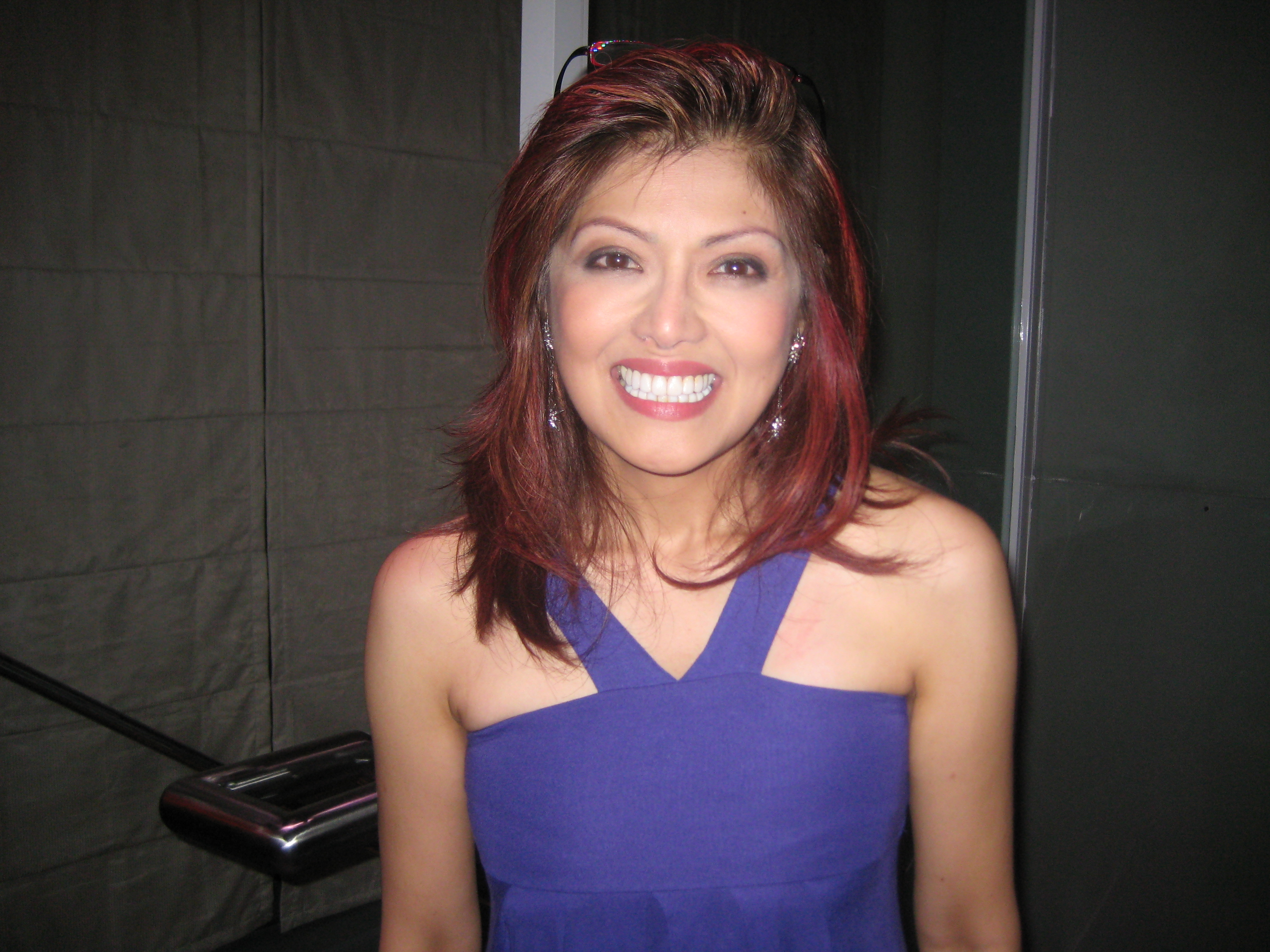
Imee Marcos at a CREAM event

Marcos has been president and executive producer of Renegade Filmmakers since 1996.

In 2007, along with some industry luminaries, Imee Marcos established the Creative Media and Film Society of the Philippines (CREAM). A year after CREAM evolved into CREAM Content Distribution, Inc., a production company that specializes in animation, game and film production. She is currently the president of CREAM.

=== Unexplained wealth ===
Imee Marcos was named in the Offshore Leaks – Panama Papers, along with her three sons, Fernando Martin, Matthew Joseph, Ferdinand Richard Michael, her sister Irene Marcos, her brother-in-law Gregorio Maria Araneta III, and her estranged husband Tommy Manotoc's relatives Ricardo Gabriel Kalaw Manotoc and Teodoro Kalaw Manotoc. According to records uncovered by the International Consortium of Investigative Journalists, Imee and her three sons are beneficiaries of the Sintra Trust, which was formed in June 2002 in the British Virgin Islands. Other documents, the latest dated 2010, also name Imee as a financial adviser for the Sintra Trust as well as ComCentre Corporation, which was formed in January 2002 and is still in operation. She is also identified as a "master client" for the M Trust, which was formed in July 1997 and closed July 2009. However, these three offshore accounts do not appear in Imee's Statement of Assets, Liabilities and Net worth (SALN). The SALN is required of all public officials and employees, and should include all of the officials' assets and liabilities.

=== Misuse of tobacco funds ===
On March 2, 2017, House Majority Leader Rodolfo Fariñas, along with Pampanga representatives Aurelio Gonzales Jr. and Juan Pablo Bondoc, filed House Resolution 882, which requested the House Committee on Good Government to "conduct an inquiry" about the misuse of PHP66.45 million from Ilocos Norte's share of excise tax funds to obtain more than 110 units of motor vehicles. The resolution cited that the "highly irregular purchase" violated 2 republic acts—RA No. 7171, "An Act to Promote the Development of the Farmer in the Virginia Tobacco Producing Provinces," and RA No. 9184, "Government Procurement Reform Act --and 1 presidential decree: PD No. 1445, Government Auditing Code of the Philippines. The investigation began on May 2, 2017.

The vehicles were said to be for distribution to the different barangays and municipalities. Marcos justified the purchase as a response to the multiple requests of farmers asking for vehicles, although Fariñas had pointed out that RA 7171 does not include purchasing vehicles as a means to utilize the excise tax. He also pointed out that a barangay captain from Laoag City received vehicles, despite the fact that there are no tobacco farms in that area. Other barangay captains have also complained that the vehicles were not duly registered under the Land Transportation Office (LTO), or filed as government property, so costs for oil and gas could not be reimbursed by the barangay budget.

At a July 24, 2017 hearing, six local officials confessed that they have access to tobacco excise tax funds used to pay 70 mini-trucks. Pedro Agcaoili, Eden Batulayan, Josephine Calajete, Encarnacion Gaor, Genedine Jambaro, and Evangeline Tabulog also acknowledged that their signatures were written on pertinent documents, a fact that they had previously denied. Marcos also admitted that the said mini-trucks were bought from a direct contractor, and was not up for public bidding, as was the protocol when government property is procured.

Upon continued investigation and hearings, the House committee discovered that all the purchased vehicles "were overpriced by PHP21,450,000." The direct contractor who sold 40 units of mini cab was identified as Mark Chua, who is also currently Marcos's long-time boyfriend, who overpriced the mini cabs by PHP7,800,000 overall. The committee also verified the complaints from barangay captains that the vehicles did not have registrations from the LTO. Committee Report No. 638 therefore concluded and recommended that charges be filed against Marcos, Chua, and several local officials. As of July 2018, another "fact-finding investigation" initiated by the Office of the Ombudsman is underway. If they find enough cause, the Ombudsman will then open a formal investigation.

=== As beneficiaries of illegal Swiss foundations ===
In the conviction of her mother Imelda Marcos for seven counts of graft in November 2018, the Sandiganbayan anti-graft court found that illegal Swiss foundations were used to earn from investments and interests to benefit Imelda and Ferdinand Marcos and their beneficiaries Imee Marcos, Bongbong Marcos, and Irene Marcos-Araneta.

The Sandiganbayan's 5th Division convicted former Imelda Marcos for creating and maintaining seven private foundations in Switzerland while holding government positions from 1968 to 1986. Imee and her siblings were named as beneficiaries of two of the illegal foundations: the Trinidad Foundation and the Xandy Foundation.

=== Senator (2019–present) ===
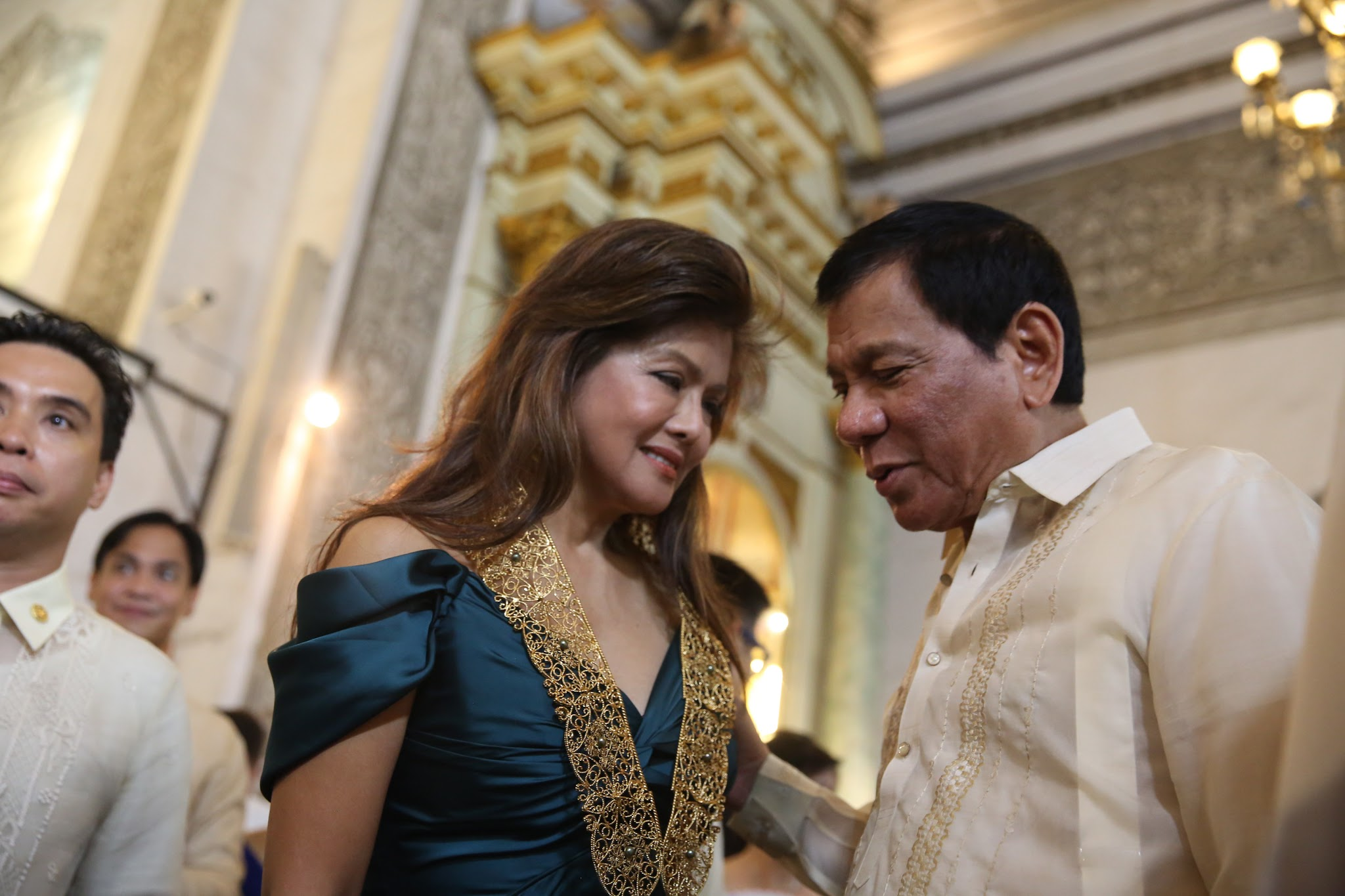
Governor Marcos (left) with President Rodrigo Duterte on the sideline at Waldo and Regine Carpio's wedding ceremony at the San Agustin Church in Intramuros, Manila, on September 16, 2016.

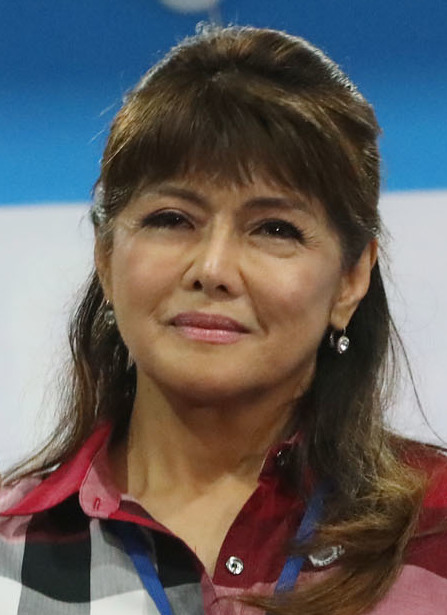
Marcos in 2018

Marcos filed her certificate of candidacy on October 16, 2018, accidentally arriving at the same time as human rights advocate Chel Diokno, who was also filing his candidacy. Because Chel Diokno's crowds supported his human rights advocacy, political chants quickly transitioned into protest chants concerning the Marcos martial law legacy, including the traditional protest chants "Never Again to Martial Law" and "Marcos Hitler Diktador Tuta!" (Marcos: Hitler, Dictator, Lapdog"). Imee Marcos did not acknowledge either Chel Diokno or the protest chants of his supporters.

On November 10, 2018, the anti-graft court Sandiganbayan found that she and her siblings benefited from the illegal Swiss foundations that her mother, Imelda Marcos, created and maintained. On November 25, 2018, Marcos proposed to expand the Pantawid Pamilyang Pilipino Program (4Ps) by providing a monthly income to fishermen and farmers. Marcos also proposed a rescue package to support coconut farmers.

Despite the senatorial campaign not yet in effect, Marcos began a premature senatorial campaign in numerous provinces. On January 17, 2019, Cebu City mayor Tomas Osmeña ordered the taking down of political tarpaulins of Marcos during the Sinulog Festival; the mayor criticized Marcos for 'politicizing' a religious festivity.

In her campaigns, she noted that she was a graduate of Princeton University in the United States. However, Princeton deputy university spokesperson Michael Hotchkiss stated that Imee's claim was false and completely fabricated, as she never graduated from Princeton University. At the same time, Imee's claim that she was a cum laude from the University of the Philippines Diliman was found to be fabricated. UP Executive Vice President Teodoro Herbosa noted that "there is no record of Imee's graduation from UPD (University of the Philippines Diliman) nor any honors or academic distinctions received with the University Registrar's office." During a February 9, 2019, senatorial debate, Marcos called on the government to remove term limits in elections, sparking criticism. Term limit removal was used by her father, the late former President Ferdinand Marcos, in the 1970s which led to a 21-year brutal regime. On March 6, 2019, amid Imee's fake degrees controversy, President Duterte's daughter, Sara Duterte, backed Marcos, stating, "Honesty should not be an election issue," effectively yielding to Imee's fabricated claims. Marcos has also claimed she graduated from Santa Catalina School as "class valedictorian" for more than four decades. On March 21, 2019, Santa Catalina School assistant head of school John Aimé disproved Imee's claims, stating: 'Imee Marcos attended our school for a brief period in the fall of 1972, she is not a graduate.' After Imee's third educational attainment claim was disproved, the Asian Institute of Management (AIM)'s Registrar and Student Enterprise Director, Bryan Magbutay, reiterated, "In our 50 years of providing world class programs we never offered an MA MBA," effectively disproving Imee's fourth educational attainment claim.

In another campaign meet-up, Marcos stated that she was "too young" to have any power during her father's dictatorship, and that she should not be blamed for the things she did due to her youth. However, records show that she was already 30 years old when her family was ousted from power in 1986.

On January 25, 2019, Marcos tweeted that Ilocos Norte's poverty incidence rate lessened under her governorship; however, the very same tweet showed poverty incidence rate actually increased during her rule. Poverty reduction rate was 17% in 2006, while it dropped to 5% in 2015. The tweet was afterwards deleted. In April 2019, Marcos stated that she intends to make working abroad a "matter of choice", however, she dodged questions on her father's dictatorship - which led to the country's economic collapse, forcing Filipinos to work abroad in the first place.

On April 11, 2019, after China again reiterated its claims in the South China Sea, Marcos announced that she "trusts China", falsely claiming that China never invaded any Philippine territory. She also blamed the Philippines, falsely claiming that Filipinos started the territorial conflicts with China, earning criticism from Filipinos.

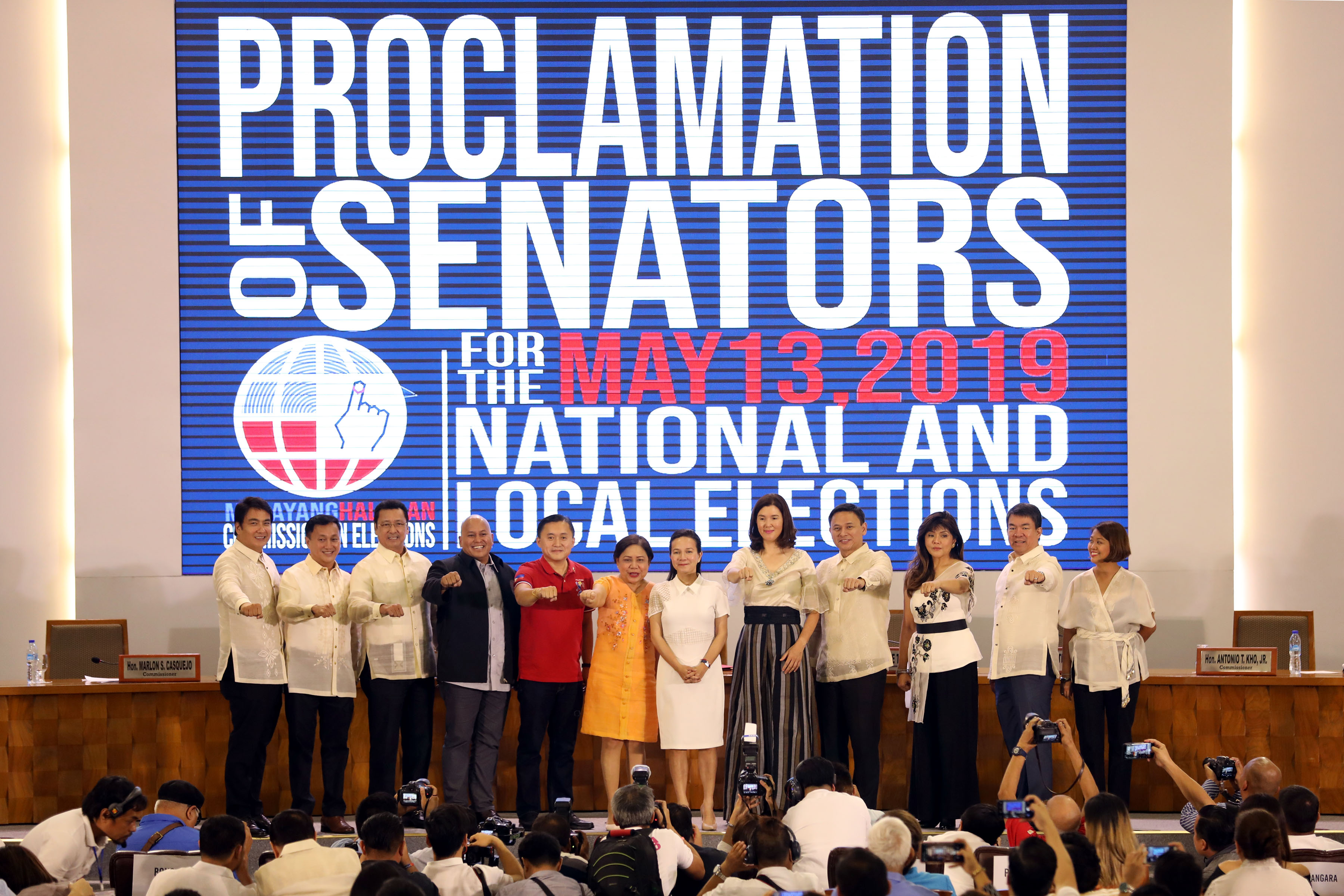
Marcos (3rd from right) flashes President Duterte's signature fist during the proclamation of senators at the Philippine International Convention Center Forum in 2019.

After the 2019 Philippine Senate election, she placed eighth and won one of the twelve contested seats. On June 30, 2019, Marcos officially took office in the Senate and filed various bills during her first months including her own version of the SOGIE bill or the Sexual Orientation or Gender Identity or Expression Bill that was first filed by fellow Senator Risa Hontiveros.

In the 2025 Philippine Senate elections, Marcos was included in the Alyansa para sa Bagong Pilipinas slate until she left the group twice. She was endorsed by Vice President Sara Duterte formally adopted as a guest candidate in the DuterTen slate. After she placed twelfth and won a contested seat, Marcos seeks to protect Vice President Duterte from the impeachment.

==== 18th Congress (2019–2022) ====
On July 22, 2019, Marcos was appointed as chair of the Philippine Senate Cultural Communities Committee.

On August 6, 2019, Marcos filed a bill that would make men also liable for committing adultery. Following the controversial transfer of ₱42 billion by the Department of Health to the Department of Budget and Management-Procurement Service (DBM-PS) for the purchase of COVID-19 pandemic personal protective equipment, in September 2021, Marcos filed a bill seeking to abolish the DBM-PS and the Philippine International Trading Corporation to "address systemic corruption" in the DBM-PS. In September 2021, the Philippine Offshore Gaming Operator (POGO) Law was signed into law by President Duterte. Senator Imee Marcos voted in favor of the law, which regulated and legalized POGOs, which are gambling corporations. The illegal activities of the POGOs were known since 2016, and were widely exposed to the public even before the law that legalized them was enacted.

==== 19th Congress (2022–2025) ====
In the 19th Congress, Marcos was named as chair of four Senate committees: Cooperatives; Electoral Reforms and People's Participation; Foreign Relations; and Social Justice, Welfare and Rural Development. In December 2022, Marcos filed "fruit salad" bills promoting and protecting the Philippine's pineapple, moringa, dragon fruit, and mango industries.

In June 2023, Marcos filed a Senate resolution seeking to investigate a "request" by the United States government for the Philippines to temporarily house Afghan refugees. Marcos maintained the request lacked transparency and said some refugees, who are "supporters of the US and possibly, even former employees of the US government or US companies", pose a threat to public safety and national security.

In November 2023, Marcos reaffirmed her support and loyalty to former president Rodrigo Duterte and Vice President Sara Duterte regarding the issue of confidential funds, while stating that the Philippines does not need to cooperate with the International Criminal Court (ICC) as it will "cause great shame for the Filipinos" citing the courts are working, free and strong.

On October 2, 2024, Marcos would file her certificate of Candidacy for re-election as senator for the 2025 Senate elections, she initially declined to be a part of her Brother's Senatoial slate, Alyansa para sa Bagong Pilipinas back on September 28, 2024, but she would later be reintroduced back in the slate on February 11, 2025, during their Proclamation rally.

In March 2025, Marcos would lead a Senate investigation regarding the circumstances surrounding the arrest of Rodrigo Duterte, which she stated had "deeply divided the nation."

On March 26, 2025, Marcos would withdraw again from Alyansa after the arrest of Rodrigo Duterte, saying that she could "no longer stand on the same platform with the rest of the Alyansa senatorial candidates."

on April 14, 2025, Vice President Sara Duterte endorsed Marcos's re-election bid in a 31-second political advertisement which the two were dressed in black, slammed the current state of the Philippines.

On May 10, 2025, Marcos and former fellow Alyansa mate, Camille Villar, were adopted by Oppositional senatorial slate, DuterTen, led by PDP as guest candidates.

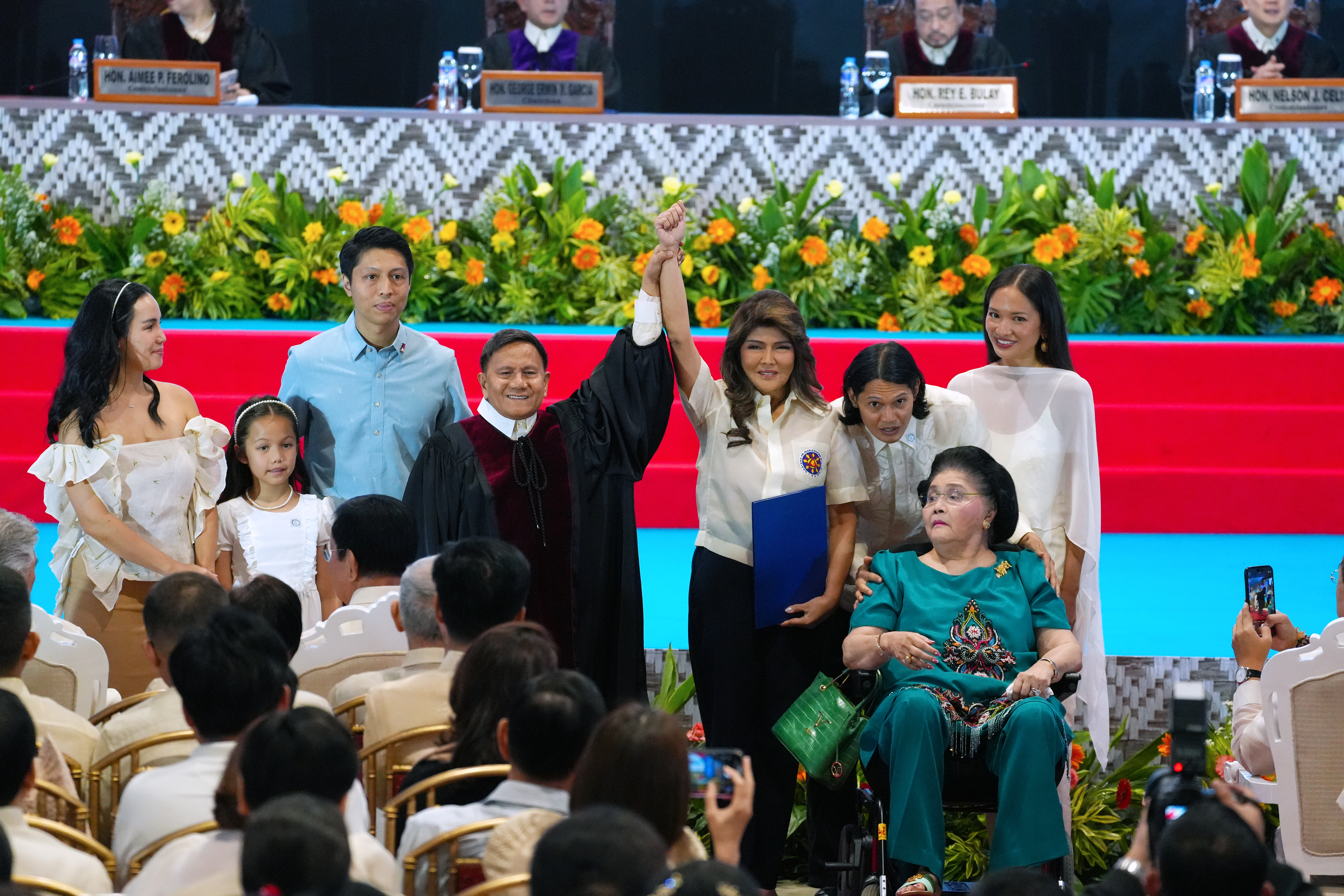
Marcos being proclaimed as a senator-elect on May 17, 2025

Despite lagging in the last pre-election surveys, Marcos would later win the election by placing 12th and managing to gain 13,339,227 votes.

==== 20th Congress (2025–present) ====
In 2026, Marcos made claims on the senate floor that the 2028 Presidential elections in the Philippines would be cancelled. However that was disproven when President BongBong Marcos stated that he could not violate the 1987 Philippine constitution related to elections and would step down.

== Party affiliation ==
Marcos formerly belonged to the Kilusang Bagong Lipunan (KBL), the political party of her father. In 2009, she and her family joined the alliance of the Nacionalista Party in support of its 2010 presidential candidate, then-Senator Manny Villar. Incidentally, her father used to be a member of Nacionalista before he founded KBL in 1978.

== Martial law denialism ==
As with other Marcos family members who have stayed in the public eye since their return to the Philippines, Imee Marcos has received significant criticism for instances of historical revisionism, and the denial or trivializing of the human rights violations and economic plunder that took place during the Marcos administration, and of the role she played in the administration.

Prominent examples of statements by Imee Marcos which have received such criticism include her 2016 statement that she was "too young" to have any power during her father's administration (although she was already 30 years old when her father was ousted in February 1986), and her 2018 assertion that critics should just "move on" regarding the crimes and excesses of the martial law era.

=== "Move on" remark regarding martial law abuses ===
On August 21, 2018, the anniversary of the assassination of Senator Benigno Aquino Jr. who had flown back to the Philippines to face her father, Imee Marcos told Filipinos to "move on" from the abuses, murders and massacres during her father's dictatorship. Imee Marcos stated, "The millennials have moved on, and I think people at my age should also move on as well".

To this, various sectors of the youth protested, releasing statements such as "She has no right to claim what our stand is on the issue. Not in our name, Imee Marcos," "The millennials, the youth in general, have not moved on and we will never move on from the Marcoses' crimes against the Filipino people. Not until justice has been served to the thousands of Filipinos who were killed, abducted and tortured under their reign, we will not move on", "Binubuo pa lang ako ng magulang ko may utang na ako. Paano ako nagmo-move on Imee Marcos?" (I was still being formed by my parents in the womb, already I had debts. How can I move on, Imee Marcos?), "When your family's in jail, when you return what you stole, when Marcos is taken out of Libingan ng mga Bayani, then we move on," and "The gall of Imee Marcos to ask why many have not "moved on" from the turbulent past they caused is like asking someone who got robbed to just think of the stolen item as donation. Isauli niyo mga ninakaw ninyo! (Return what you stole!)"

In a statement before media, Marcos said "...what I've heard is that there are calls for an apology tantamount on admission, which we would never do" and stated that she did not know what her family should admit to in the first place.

=== Family denial ===
Imee Marcos denies that human rights abuses occurred during her family's regime, calling them political accusations. In a press briefing, she said "Kung ang dinedemand ay admission (of guilt) ay palagay ko hindi pwede 'yun" (If what is demanded is an admission of guilt, I don't think that's possible). When asked why, she replied: "Bakit kami mag-aadmit sa hindi namin ginawa?" (Why would we admit to something we did not do?). She added, "As we all know, these are political accusations that have not been proven in court". This is despite having been convicted before a U.S. district court through the 1993 Trajano v. Marcos case (978 F 2d 493).

== Electoral history ==
Electoral history of Imee Marcos
Year	Office	Party	Votes received				Result
Year	Office	Party	Total	%	P.	Swing	Result
1984	Mambabatas Pambansa (Assemblyman) from Ilocos Norte	KBL	199,837	—N/a	1st	—N/a	Won
1998	Representative (Ilocos Norte–2nd)	KBL	65,733	64.00%	1st	—N/a	Won
2001	Representative (Ilocos Norte–2nd)	KBL	—N/a	—N/a	1st	—N/a	Won
2004	Representative (Ilocos Norte–2nd)	KBL	—N/a	—N/a	1st	—N/a	Won
2010	Governor of Ilocos Norte	Nacionalista	196,160	69.34%	1st	—N/a	Won
2013	Governor of Ilocos Norte	Nacionalista	244,092	100.00%	1st	—N/a	Unopposed
2016	Governor of Ilocos Norte	Nacionalista	279,144	100.00%	1st	—N/a	Unopposed
2019	Senator of the Philippines	Nacionalista	15,882,628	33.58%	8th	—N/a	Won
2025	Senator of the Philippines	Nacionalista	13,339,227	23.26%	12th	—N/a	Won

== Filmography ==
=== Film ===
Year	Title	Role
1977	Da Real Makoy	Herself; producer (uncredited)
1978	Tadhana	Producer
2005	Fly Aswang	Story writer and producer
2010	Donor	Executive producer
2011	Pintakasi	Executive producer
2022	Maid in Malacañang	Executive producer
2023	Martyr or Murderer	Story writer and executive producer

=== Television ===
Year	Title	Role
1996	GMA Telesine Specials: Tinimbang na Dangal	Patricia
1997–2001	1 for 3	Dra. Kay
1998	GMA Telesine Specials: Kapag Kumatok ang Pag-Ibig	Tina
2003	Ang Iibigin ay Ikaw Pa Rin	Donato Verde's lawyer
2024–present	At the Moment with Imee	Host

== Personal life ==
Marcos is the eldest daughter of Ferdinand Marcos and Imelda Romuáldez Marcos. Her full siblings are Bongbong Marcos, Irene Marcos, and Aimee Marcos. She also has a number of half-siblings who are not as known by the public at large. This includes three siblings which her father had with Carmen Ortega of the Ortega clan of La Union, who was his common-law wife before he married Imelda Romuáldez as a political strategy.

Marcos was married to golfer and former professional basketball coach Tommy Manotoc. Their marriage was controversial since the Philippines did not have a divorce law and Manotoc's October 1981 divorce obtained in the Dominican Republic from wife Aurora Pijuan was not recognized under Philippine law. Marcos and Manotoc have three sons: Fernando Martín ("Borgy"), a commercial model and club DJ; Ferdinand Richard Michael ("Mike"), a lawyer; and Matthew Joseph ("MJ"), a sports agent and incumbent governor of Ilocos Norte since June 30, 2019. She had two stepchildren during her marriage to Manotoc, including ABS-CBN reporter and news anchor TJ Manotoc.

On October 19, 2000, a 27-year-old film producer from Leyte, Leyte named Cesar Bendigo who was allegedly in a romantic relationship with Marcos was killed in an ambush by New People's Army rebels; Marcos last visited his residence on August 24, 2000.

Since her legal separation from Manotoc, Marcos has been in a long-term relationship with Singaporean and ethnic Chinese businessman and resident Mark Chua, since the 1990s. Marcos and Chua have been linked to the ₱64.5 million Ilocos Norte Tobacco Excise Tax Funds Scandal.
