= Nonoy Marcelo =

Filipino cartoonist, animator and filmmaker (born 1939)

- Marcelo in 2002
- Born: Severino Marcelo; January 22, 1939; Malabon, Philippines
- Died: October 22, 2002 (aged 63); Manila, Philippines
- Education: Far Eastern University
- Occupations: Cartooning; film director; producer; screenwriter; animator; editor
- Years active: 1948–2002
- Organization(s): National Media Production Center (1977–1986)
- Children: 5
- Relatives: José Zabala-Santos (uncle)

Severino “Nonoy” Santos Marcelo (January 22, 1939 – October 22, 2002) was a Filipino cartoonist, animator and filmmaker. A significant figure of Philippine animation and comics, he is best known for creating comic strips Plain Folks and Ikabod Bubwit, and directing an animated television film Tadhana (1978), the first true Philippine animated feature.

His early trademark was known for creating cartoons with lampooned lifestyles for Filipino youths. Upon joining the National Media Production Center to evade censorship from politics in the midst of martial law administered by the Philippines' tenth president Ferdinand Marcos Sr., Marcelo was publicly viewed as a political cartoonist and propagandist for his irreverent witty, biting cartoons with political satires and social commentaries provided on Philippine conflicts to criticize the repressive regime infusing with signature subversive humor. This led to his creation of the allegorical character Ikabod Bubwit, an allegory of Ferdinand Marcos, retrospectively became a satirical chronicle of Philippine politics and society.

Aside from cartoons, he was frequently tasked by the government in invitation to join the New Society Movement as a filmmaker to direct propaganda films for the Marcos administration, including Da Real Makoy (1977) and Tadhana (1978), at the time which was collaborated with close friend and producing partner Imee Marcos. He was also an animation and sound director in the Philippine media, and a screenwriter of films and television adaptations of Tisoy.

Following Tadhana, Marcelo was admired by filmmakers and students for his affect on animation, which led to the establishment of Philippine animation industry for creating their original works and for outsourced services from international studios starting in the early 1980s.

== Early life ==
Marcelo was born in Malabon, Rizal, Philippines on January 22, 1939, to David Marcelo, a war hero and an assistant dean of Far Eastern University (FEU) and Rita Santos, an FEU English professor. He was a prodigy.

== Career ==
=== Before Marcos's administration (1948–1966) ===
==== Likmuan ng mga Pighati sa Paligid-ligid ====
At the age of nine, he had a published book to his credit, a comic book entitled Likmuan ng mga Pighati sa Paligid-ligid (English: Seat of Sorrows All Around). He once admitted in an interview with the Diliman Review, drawing was already in his veins since he was a child.

==== Plain Folks ====
He created the comic strips Plain Folks, which appeared in the Daily Mirror during the early 1960s, and Tisoy in 1963 for the Manila Times, which tells about the lifestyle of young Filipinos. His main character, Tisoy (slang for "mestizo"), and cast members such as Aling Otik, Maribubut, Caligula, Tatang, Tikyo and Kinse, soon became established in Philippine pop culture.

==== Tisoy ====
Marcelo developed Tisoy in 1963, which lampooned Filipino lifestyles to youths. His characters Aling Otik, her grandson Kinse and his cat Myawok, among others, romped through the comic strip. Alfredo Roces, a former dean of FEU, was his model for the main character.

=== Marcos's administration (1966–1986) ===
==== Tisoy adaptations ====
Tisoy adapted three times during the Marcos administration: a 1968 television miniseries and its 1969 television film featuring Jimmy Morato and Pilar Pilapil, and a 1977 theatrical film directed by Ishmael Bernal, starring Christopher de Leon and Charo Santos.

==== Da Real Makoy ====
A 1977 half-hour propaganda documentary film about the former president and dictator Ferdinand Marcos during a trip to Ilocos.

==== Ikabod ====
Ikabod ran from the late 1970s to 2002. It was a satirical strip that re-cast the Philippines as a nation called Dagalandia. The strip humorously depicted the socio-political woes of ordinary Filipinos, as represented by the tailless Everymouse hero, Ikabod - who became as iconic in his own way as that other popular cartoon rodent, Mickey Mouse. Marcelo often used the strip to caricature political figures from Ferdinand Marcos and Corazon Aquino to Joseph Estrada and Gloria Macapagal Arroyo, re-imagining them as mice.

==== Tadhana ====
He was collaborated again with Imee to participate the project adapted from Ferdinand's novel into an 54-minute adult animated film titled Tadhana (1978), which originally conceived as a television pilot due to a lengthy process.

==== The Adventures of Lam-Ang and Annie Batungbakal ====
Opening scene which included an animated version of Hotdog band in Annie Batungbakal (1979).

In 1979, The Adventures of Lam-Ang was produced a one-hour animated feature based on Biag ni Lam-ang, a Philippine epic poem. At the same year, Marcelo served as animation director for a seven-minute opening scene in Nora Aunor's Annie Batungbakal.

=== After Marcos's administration (1986–2000) ===
==== Mighty Pens ====
He was featured in Time for its cover story Mighty Pens, published on September 12, 1988, for his bold commentaries on the current socio-political state of the country through his comic strips, making him the only Asian cartoonist.

==== Bayaning 3rd World ====
In 1999, Marcelo made his final work as an animator in Noli and Fili parts of the film. According to film director Mike De Leon, the original script of the film was meant to include several animation sequences from Marcelo, which he did studies but the animation proved to be an impractical idea.

== Personal life ==
=== Education ===
Marcelo graduated the Institute of Arts and Sciences from FEU with an AB English degree. He took a course in advance animation from the School of Visual Arts in New York in 1971 and a filmmaking course from the New School for Social Research in 1972, soon became a cartoonist in an American magazine cover The Advocate at the same year.

Marcelo was appointed the title of Senior Lecturer in Film Animation at the UP College of Fine Arts by a chairwoman of Department of Visual Communication, Margarita Revilla Simpliciano, during the deanship of National Artist Napoleon V. Abueva.

=== Death ===
Nonoy Marcelo died at the Chinese General Hospital in Manila on October 22, 2002, at the age of 63. He died of sepsis due to complications from his diabetes. He was survived by his five children: Dario, Sarita, Ninoy, Rajah and Jinoy; Dario was an editor and co-author of a memoir Huling Ptyk: Da Art of Nonoy Marcelo about his late father's history, collaborated with his father's friend Pandy Aviado.

== Bibliography ==
- Likmuan ng mga Pighati sa Paligid-ligid (1948)
- Plain Folks (1960s)
- Tisoy (1963)
- Ikabod Bubwit (1970s-2002)

== Filmography ==
=== Films ===
| Year | Title | Director | Writer | Animator | Editor | Notes | Ref. |
|---|---|---|---|---|---|---|---|
| 1969 | Tisoy | No | Yes | No | No | | |
| 1977 | Da Real Makoy | Yes | Yes | Yes | No | Documentary film; directorial debut | |
| 1977 | Tisoy! | No | Yes | No | No | | |
| 1978 | Tadhana | Yes | Yes | Yes | Yes | | |
| 1979 | Biag ni Lam-ang | Yes | Yes | Yes | Yes | | |
| 1979 | Annie Batungbakal | No | No | Yes | No | | |
| 2000 | Bayaning 3rd World | No | No | Yes | No | Noli / Fili | |

=== Television series ===
| Year | Title | Director | Writer | Animator | Notes | Ref. |
|---|---|---|---|---|---|---|
| 1968 | Tisoy | No | Yes | No | | |
| 1970s | Ikabod Bubwit | Yes | Yes | Yes | Television special | |
| 1980s | Poptech Series | Yes | Yes | Yes | 4 episodes | |

== Legacy ==
After the People Power Revolution, Marcelo was given the Catholic Mass Media Award for the Best Comic Strip in 1986 for Ikabod and in 1988 for both Ikabod and Aling Otik. In 1998, Marcelo received the Cultural Center of the Philippines' Centennial Artist Award, the only cartoonist to be honored; cited him by CCP for excellence in the visual arts and for helping define national identity by taking a stand on political and social issues.

In 2002, the Patnubay Award for Visual Arts given by the City of Manila. Eighteen years after his death, he has been nominated for the Order of the National Artist in the Visual Arts category.

In 2008, Marcelo was posthumously honored the Lifetime Achievement Award by members of Animahenasyon, an annual animation film festival in the Philippines.
