= Tadhana (film) =

1978 Filipino animated film

- Archivo 1984 film poster
- Directed by: Nonoy Marcelo
- Written by: Nonoy Marcelo
- Based on: Tadhana: History of the Filipino People by Ferdinand Marcos
- Produced by: Imee Marcos
- Edited by: Nonoy Marcelo
- Music by: Freddie Aguilar
- Production company: National Media Production Center
- Release date: September 21, 1978
- Running time: 54 minutes
- Country: Philippines
- Languages: Filipino; English

Tadhana (Note: Also known as Nonoy Marcelo's "Tadhana: A History of the Filipino People") (English: Destiny) is a 1978 Philippine adult animated historical comedy film written and directed by cartoonist Nonoy Marcelo. Presenting a satirical and light-hearted take on Philippine history, the film depicts several historical figures and mythological creatures during the Spanish colonial period through various vignettes.

Based on a book of the same name by Ferdinand Marcos, the tenth president of the Philippines, Tadhana was commissioned by the Marcos' government to contributed as a part of the martial law propaganda for the New Society Movement. The film served Imee Marcos as a producer alongside his uncle and collaborator José Zabala-Santos as one of the animators.

Tadhana is the first feature-length animated film ever produced in the Philippines, despite being released as a television film, premiered on Philippine television on September 21, 1978, in commemoration of the sixth anniversary of martial law. Although the film fell into obscurity, it became a staple film for educational purposes in subsequent decades.

== Plot ==
Set before the colonization, zooming and intercutting images of illustrations and maps depict the war between Spain and Portugal for global colonial rights of the Philippines. In preparation to colonize, Spanish galleons, led by Ferdinand Magellan, set sail across the Pacific Ocean to one of the Philippine islands, Mactan, where it declares war with armadas against the Filipino natives led by Lapu-Lapu (Villame), lops off Magellan's head.

Meanwhile, Kulafu (Nonoy), an alipin of a drunkard leader Datu Tausi (Bert), struggles to acquire the mutya, a magical talisman from the heart of the banana tree that is said to give him power and eternal life. The datu's son, Boyet, tags along Kulafu's quest. Spanish conquistador Miguel Lopez de Legazpi, along with an explorer Diego de Artieda and a Dominican friar, watch Kulafu and Boyet afar.

Spaniards invite the natives to be part of the Sandugo Art Exhibit to make a peace treaty with a Bohol chieftain Datu Sikatuna under their blood oath. Another attempt at colonization, headed by Legaspi, almost succeeds without bloodshed through an oath. The festivities in the exhibit are interrupted by the arrival of Rajah Sulayman. He is furious that he is not invited to the party and is not appeased by the special treatment the other Rajas were doing to the Spaniards. Upon finding out that the Spaniards intended to invade Maynila, Sulayman calls off the natives to fight against the invasion.

While the natives resisting the invasion led by the Spaniards, Kulafu and Boyet observe the war from a distance, unwilling to test the power of the mutya. They find out Tausi died in the battlefield amidst the other natives and invaders who have fallen in battle. They both weep for Tausi, and Kulafu hears chanting.

== Cast ==
- Nonoy Marcelo as Kulafu and Boyet
- Pandy Aviado as Miguel Lopez de Legazpi
- Bert Marcelo as Datu Tausi
- Estrella Kuenzler as a veiled sorceress (babaylan)
- Yoyoy Villame as Lapu-Lapu
- Mike Parsons as a Dominican friar

== Production ==
=== Development ===
Nonoy Marcelo (left) and Imee Marcos (right) worked together on the film for the sixth anniversary of martial law.

After becoming interested in animation while working as a cartoonist, Nonoy Marcelo was hired by the Philippine government to work as an animator at the National Media Production Center beginning in 1977. He then collaborated with Imee Marcos, with whom he had previously worked with on the 1977 documentary film Da Real Makoy, and his uncle José Zabala-Santos by creating the first-ever full-length animated film to come out of the Philippines, which was originally conceived as a television pilot that sought to teach the nation's history from the perspective of the Marcos administration.

While writing and directing the film, he added his own interpretation of the history of the Philippines as a series of vignettes, including whimsical, satirical, sometimes subversive and particularly anti-clerical touches to the narrative. Imee insists that while it was not only a literally faithful adaptation of her father's books, it was faithful to their themes.

=== Animation ===
The animation studio was set up in Quezon City to highlight the strategic focus placed on the project. Production on the film lasted for three months and employed a team of sixty artists, including printmaker Pandy Aviado, who served as the film’s animator and assistant director, and Santiago Bose, by Imee. Some of the production crew and artists also did voice work for the film, including Aviado and Marcelo himself.

Tadhana was rendered using hand drawn characters using then traced in celluloid before painted. The backgrounds were also primarily painted the same way, however, some of the scenes that was more experimental in form, were rendered using printmaking techniques. Unlike many animated features filmed in 24 frames per second, the film's animation is entirely limited with panoramic drawings using cellulose nitrate or acetate.

== Release ==
Tadhana made its broadcasting premiere as a television film on GMA 7, RPN 9, and IBC 13 to commemorate the sixth anniversary of Martial Law.

== Legacy ==
Following the immense success of Tadhana and the "turning point" of Philippine animation as a labor hub in the 1980s, it was initiative of broadcasting catered to a broad audience and embedded the film within the popular cultural milieu of the time. Due to lack of commercial release in local theaters, the film was never credited to be the first animated film from the Philippines; while it would be two decades before the next feature-length animated film was made by local producers: Geirry Garccia's Adarna: The Mythical Bird (1997).

None of copies of known print or negative 35mm film were found in the GMA archive after one-time broadcast until two decades later, when a video copy was recorded from that broadcast by Mr. Teddy Co, who lent the copy to Mowelfund Film Institute.

Tadhana was screened at the National Gallery Singapore’s ‘Painting with Light,’ an annual festival of international films on art. Before the screening, the film was rated NC16 for "some nudity" by the Infocomm Media Development Authority (IMDA).

== See also ==
- Adult animation in the Philippines
