= Archimedes Trajano =

Filipino student activist (1956–1977)

- Born: Archimedes Francisco Trajano; 1955 or 1956
- Died: September 1977 (aged 21–22)
- Occupation: Student activist

Archimedes "Archie" Francisco Trajano (1956–1977) was a Filipino student activist during the 1972–1986 martial law regime in the Philippines. His death in 1977 has been linked to Imee Marcos, the daughter of the Philippine dictator Ferdinand Marcos, who was President at the time.

== Activism ==
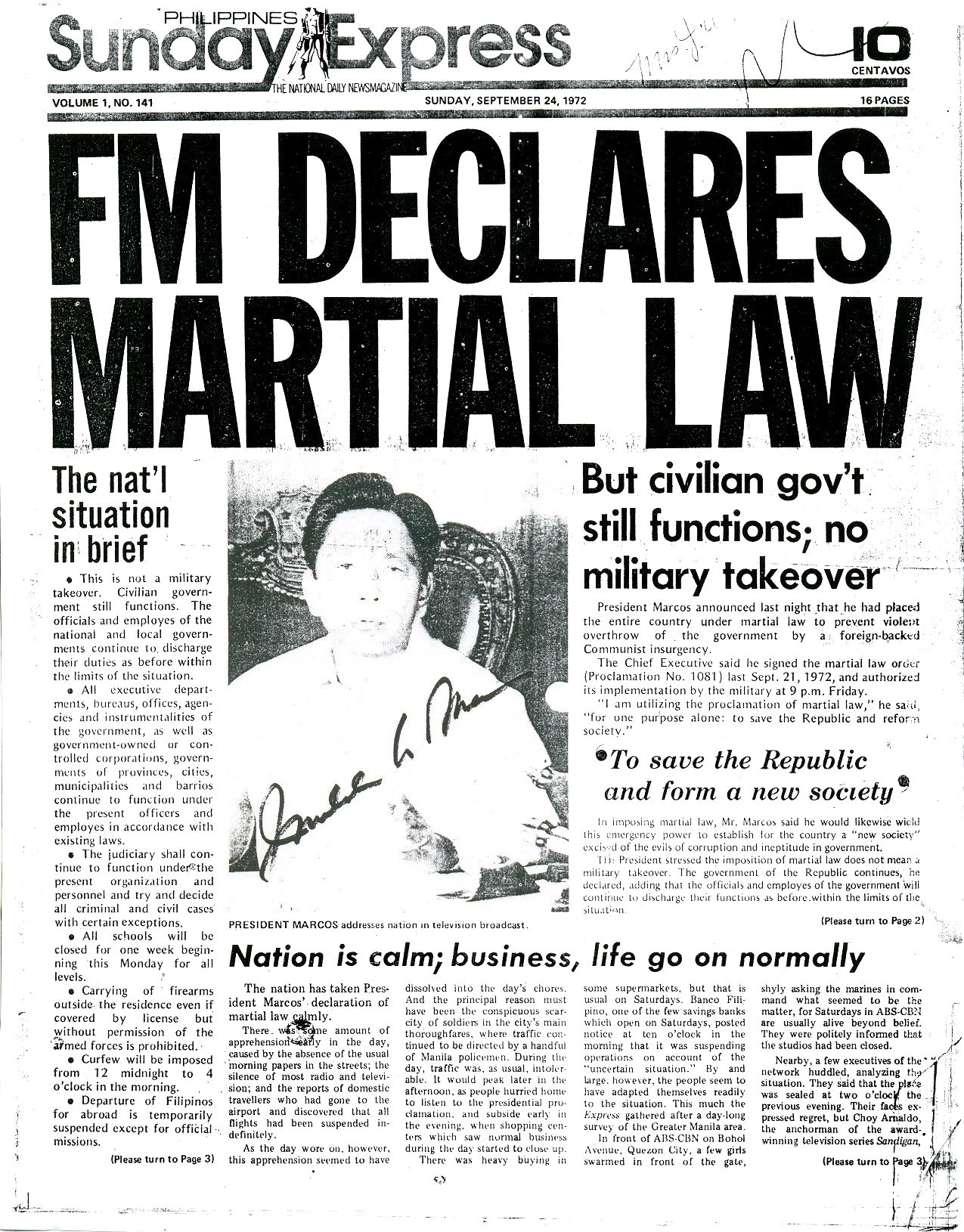
Newspaper article with headline of President Marcos declaring Martial Law

While a student at the Mapua Institute of Technology, Trajano became involved in student activism protesting the Marcos government, which had declared martial law, suspended habeas corpus, and routinely arrested and tortured political opponents whom they had deemed enemies of the state. During the First Quarter Storm and after the President's subsequent declaration of Martial Law in the country, the Marcos government frequently targeted student activists, leading to scandals such as "The Group of the 21" case, and "The Group of Three" case (The Piopongco case).

== Death ==
On Wednesday, August 31, 1977, Trajano attended an open forum held at the Pamantasan ng Lungsod ng Maynila (University of the City of Manila) where 21-year-old Imee Marcos, the eldest daughter of then-president Ferdinand Marcos Sr., was the speaker. During the forum, Trajano, who was also 21 years old at the time, questioned the appointment of Imee as the National Chairman of the Kabataang Barangay (National Youth Council). He asked, "Must the Kabataang Barangay be headed by the president’s daughter? She would not have gotten the position if she weren't the daughter of the president," which allegedly irritated Imee Marcos. Trajano was forcibly thrown out of the open forum and was subsequently blindfolded and beaten by her bodyguards. The forum was where he was last seen alive.

On September 2, 1977, Trajano was found dead with signs of beating and apparent torture and his body and face severely mangled. His mother Agapita (née Francisco) Trajano recalled that, "He was covered in a white sheet, lying on a table. And when I opened the sheet . . . I saw him black and blue". As most media outlets at the time were controlled by the government, and Trajano's death was not reported in local newspapers. An article released in an issue of the ''Bulletin Today'' the day after his death simply talked of deaths on college campuses "due to hazings conducted by fraternities.”

== Trials and convictions ==
=== Award of damages against Imee Marcos in Hawaii ===
Nine years after Trajano's death, and a month after Marcos was ousted from power and exiled, on March 20, 1986, Agapita Trajano was able to file a case against Imee Marcos and Fabian Ver (Chief of the Armed Forces of the Philippines) in Hawaii. Imee Marcos admitted in court knowledge of Trajano's fate but claimed it was "none of [her] business]". Marcos and Ver were charged with false imprisonment, kidnapping, wrongful death, and the deprivation of rights for Archimedes Trajano. Imee Marcos defended herself by claiming immunity under the Foreign Sovereign Immunities Act. This act exempts foreign agents from prosecution. However, the court denied her arguments for two reasons: one, the crime was committed beyond the scope of her official work and duties, and; two, she did not act upon the authority of the government but acted on her own authority.

Ultimately, the Hawaiian court ruled in Trajano's favor. Their decision stated: “…judgment was entered based on the court’s findings that Trajano was tortured and his death was caused by Marcos-Manotoc." The court concluded that this violation of fundamental human rights constitutes a tort in violation of the law of nations under 28 U.S.C. § 1350, and awarded damages of $4.16 million and attorneys’ fees pursuant to Philippine law." The case exposed the faults of the act of state doctrine, and paved ways for similar suits to be filed.

The 1993 conviction, Trajano v. Marcos (978 F 2d 493), is noted in U.S. legal circles for exposing the weaknesses of the act of state doctrine, allowing for similar suits to be filed.

=== Philippine court decisions ===
However, Trajano was not able to receive the payment from Marcos because the Philippine Supreme Court barred the decision. The Trajanos attempted to collect the money by filing a case in the Pasig Regional Trial Court. The court summoned Marcos but she did not appear. The court subsequently ruled in favor of the Trajanos by default. Afterwards, Imee Marcos filed a case to the Supreme Court, stating that the summons on her was invalid.

== See also ==
- Abraham Sarmiento Jr.
- Leandro Alejandro
