= Tisoy! =

1977 Filipino comedy film directed by Ishmael Bernal

- Theatrical release poster
- Directed by: Ishmael Bernal
- Written by: Severino Marcelo
- Based on: Tisoy! comic strip by Nonoy Marcelo
- Produced by: Nora Aunor Villamayor
- Starring: Christopher de Leon; Jay Ilagan; Charo Santos; Bert "Tawa" Marcelo; Lorli Villanueva
- Cinematography: Arnold Alvaro
- Edited by: Augusto Salvador
- Music by: Vanishing Tribe
- Production company: NV Productions
- Release date: April 30, 1977
- Running time: 120 minutes
- Country: Philippines
- Languages: Filipino; English

Tisoy! is a 1977 Philippine satirical comedy film directed by Ishmael Bernal from a story and screenplay written by Severino Marcelo that is based on his comic strip of the same name. The film stars Christopher de Leon, Jay Ilagan, Charo Santos, Bert "Tawa" Marcelo, and Lorli Villanueva, with the special participation of Nora Aunor, Bembol Roco, Hilda Koronel, and Elizabeth Oropesa.

Produced by NV Productions, the film was theatrically released on April 30, 1977, and it is the first film where Christopher de Leon and Charo Santos paired up. In 2019, the film was digitally restored and remastered in 4K resolution by ABS-CBN Film Restoration, in partnership with Kantana Post-Production (Thailand).

== Synopsis ==
Tisoy, a young and free-spirited balikbayan, returns to the Philippines to find his long-lost American father. While finding him somewhere in Metro Manila and its adjacent provinces, he meets new friends including Boy and reunites with his high school sweetheart Maribubut and Tikyo, a happy-go-lucky comedian from Bulacan.

== Cast ==
- Christopher de Leon as Tisoy
- Jay Ilagan as Boy
- Charo Santos as Maribubut
- Bert Marcelo as Tikyo
- Lorli Villanueva as Pomposa
- Ruffy Mendoza
- Dexter Doria as Marjorie
- Soxie Topacio as Gemmo
- Pongay
- Jun Morales as Clip
- Moody Diaz as Aling Otik

=== Special participation ===
- Nora Aunor as Corazon (from the 1976 film Minsa'y Isang Gamu-gamo)
- Dranreb Belleza as Bindoy
- Feling Cudia as Pining
- Marianne dela Riva as Woman stuck in traffic
- Johnny Delgado as Faith Healer
- Angie Ferro as Faith Healer
- Ernie Garcia as Party Guest
- Sandy Garcia as Taxi Driver
- Trixia Gomez as Party Guest
- Hilda Koronel as Lady in hotel hallway
- Edgar Mortiz as Attendant
- Orestes Ojeda as Man stuck in traffic
- Elizabeth Oropesa as Maria (from the 1976 film Nunal sa Tubig)
- Rolly Quizon as a Scuba diver in a hotel fountain
- Bembol Roco as Julio Madiaga (from the 1975 film Manila in the Claws of Light)

== Reception ==
=== Critical reception ===
Film critic Mario Hernando gave a mixed-to-positive review and called the film "partly corny" and "partly hysterically crazy".
