= Da Real Makoy =

- End title screenshot of the film
- Directed by: Nonoy Marcelo
- Written by: Nonoy Marcelo
- Produced by: Imee Marcos
- Starring: Ferdinand Marcos; Imee Marcos
- Cinematography: Edgardo Navarro
- Edited by: Edgardo Navarro
- Production company: National Media Production Center
- Release date: September 21, 1977
- Running time: 42 minutes
- Country: Philippines
- Languages: Filipino; Ilocano

Da Real Makoy (lit. The Real Macoy) is a 1977 Philippine propaganda documentary film. The film follows the tenth president of the Philippines, Ferdinand Marcos, setting a field trip to Ilocos Norte, Marcos's hometown, with his eldest daughter Imee Marcos. Shot entirely in Sarrat, Ilocos Norte with some animation sequences, the film was produced by National Media Production Center (NMPC) under her leadership Imee, who serves as a producer, and was written and directed by cartoonist Nonoy Marcelo in his directorial debut.

== Release ==
Da Real Makoy was originally released on September 21, 1977, on local theaters to commemorate the 5th anniversary of Martial Law. Despite its obscurity after the People Power Revolution in 1986, it was re-released on September 11, 2023, on Facebook to commemorate the 106th birthday of Ferdinand Marcos by the Kabataan Kontra Droga at Terorismo Ilocandia Incorporated (KKDAT) for educational purposes.

== Plot ==
The film starts on a coastline of Ilocos Norte with Paoay Church silhouetted in Javanese efflorescence, onto the region's fishermen and farmers meditative in their immemorial sea and soil.

The scene shows a light aircraft descending into Laoag International Airport. . Marcos disembarks with his eldest daughter, Imee, and is greeted by an Ilocano march and a group of graders and high school students, who board a bus bearing fare stickers on its doors.

During the board, Marcos takes on the narration himself, rambling on about how the road they were traversing, unpaved in his youth, now ran through more thickly populated towns; how he was first baptized as an Aglipayan; how his grandfather was a master brewer of basi; how his father lost their lands when he entered politics at a time, details of a much-mythified tale were difficult to verify.

== Production ==
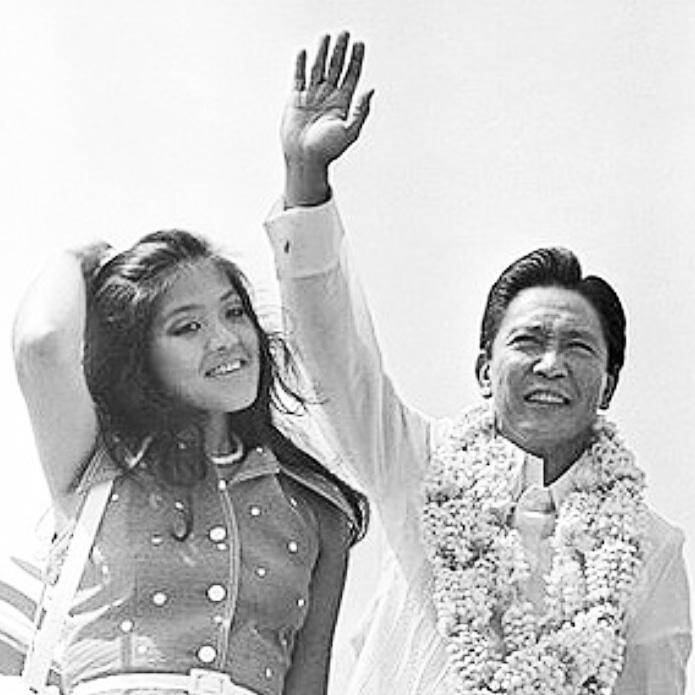
Imee Marcos and her father, Ferdinand Marcos.

Produced during a time when Marcelo was invited to join NMPC, owned by New Society Movement, in Christmas season of 1976 to make his first film as a documentary, describes a film promotion as a "smiling martial law".

The film about Marcoses going on a trip to his hometown, with Marcelo and Edgardo "Egay" Navarro are the only crew members to participate in the film; Navarro, still in the 20s when the film was made, wanted to make shots for the Ilocano residents as well as Marcos itself in a style of cinéma vérité.

Some animation sequences were provided by Marcelo, being used with quirky, sly satire of the kind of blatant hagiography being created at the time by the regime.
