= Gerry Alanguilan =

Filipino comic book artist, writer, and architect (1968–2019)

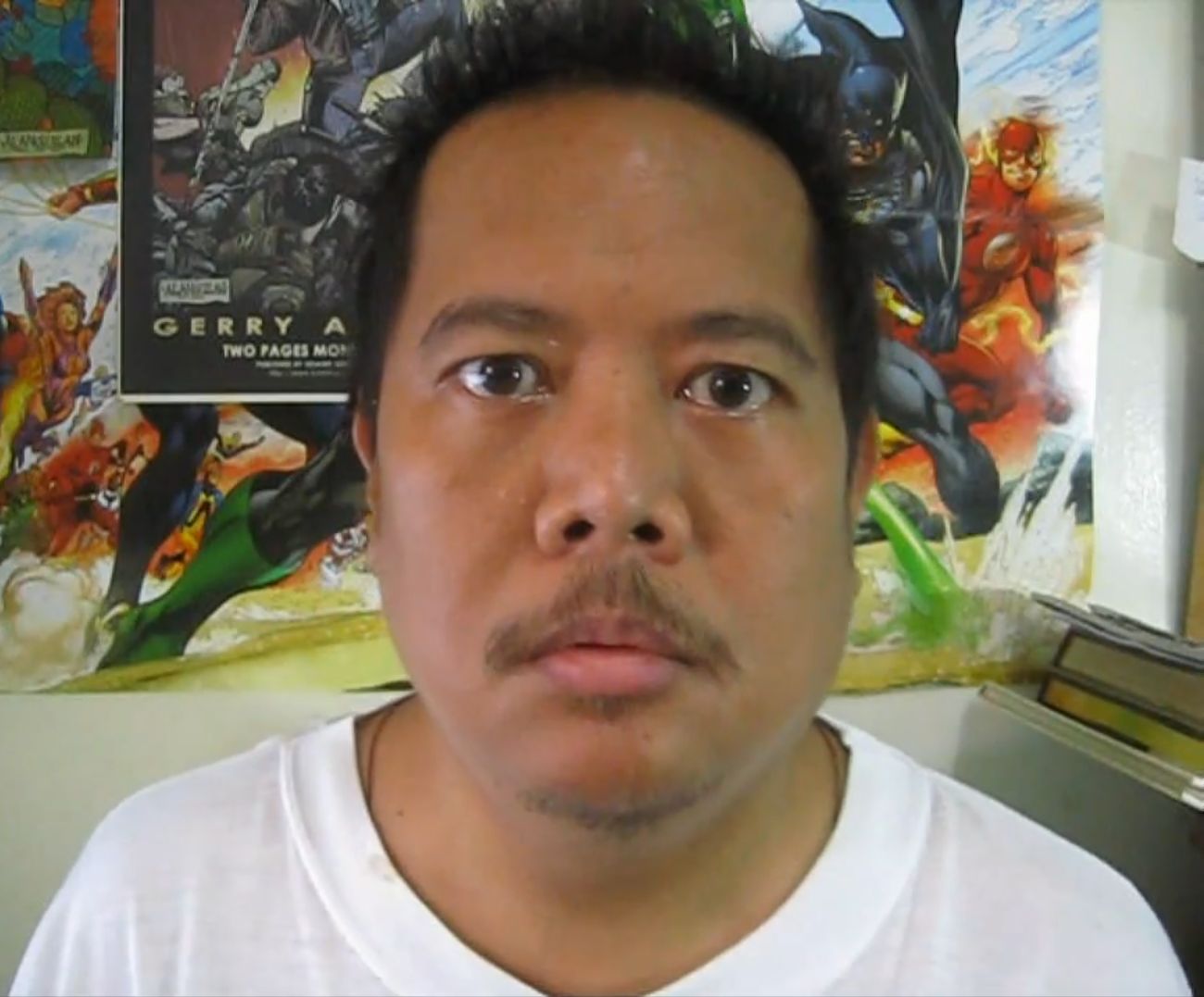
- Born: 20 January 1968 San Pablo, Laguna, Philippines
- Died: 21 December 2019 (aged 51) San Pablo, Laguna, Philippines
- Notable works: Wasted; Elmer; Wetworks; X-Men; Superman: Birthright; Wolverine; Fantastic Four; Supercrooks "Hey, Baby" video

Doroteo Gerardo N. Alanguilan Jr. (20 January 1968 – 21 December 2019), also known in the Philippines by his alias Komikero, was a Filipino comic book artist, writer, and architect from San Pablo, Laguna. He was an important figure in the Philippine comics renaissance of the 1990s and early 2000s, and is known internationally for his graphic novels Wasted and Elmer, and for his inking on American superhero comics such as Wetworks, X-Men, Superman: Birthright, Wolverine, and Fantastic Four.

Many of Alanguilan's titles take place in the Philippines or feature Filipino characters, such as Elmer, Johnny Balbona, Humanis Rex!, and Timawa. He incorporated elements of social commentary in his work, especially Elmer, which satirizes racism. Gerry Alan, the protagonist of Whilce Portacio and Brian Haberlin's comic series Stone, is named after Alanguilan.

== Early life and education ==
=== Childhood in San Pablo ===
Gerry Alanguilan was born in the city of San Pablo, Laguna in the Philippines. According to family lore, their surname was originally San Gabriel and they trace their origins to the barrio/barangay of Sta. Catalina, now part of San Pablo City and known as "Sandig" before the Spanish conquest. Their surname was changed supposedly because a witch placed a curse that would make them destitute for seven generations. Alanguilan would later use this tale as the basis for his story San Dig 1944 in the Siglo: Freedom anthology. The word "alanguilan" is itself the Tagalog name of Cananga odorata, a flowering tree now better known by the Spanish variant of its name, "Ylang-ylang."

As a child, he owned a chicken named Solano, which would later become the inspiration for his graphic novel Elmer.

=== Education ===
Alanguilan entered the University of Santo Tomas in 1984, earning a Bachelor of Science in architecture from the College of Architecture and Fine Arts in 1989 and passing the board exams to become a Licensed Architect by 1990.

=== Creative influences ===
Alanguilan has cited Barry Windsor-Smith, Alfredo Alcala, Frank Miller, Katsuhiro Otomo, and Alan Moore as creative influences, in particular Moore's 1980s reinterpretation of Marvelman.

== Comics career ==
=== Early submissions ===
Alanguilan first made submissions to Marvel Comics around 1986, while he was still in school. While these early submissions were met with rejections, Alanguilan was nevertheless encouraged by the fact that the rejection letters showed that, at the least, the executives at Marvel knew him and his work. This early period of sending submissions and receiving rejection letters lasted about seven years, during which Alanguilan sent submissions both to Marvel and DC Comics.

Alanguilan temporarily gave up on comics from 1993 to 1994. In his own blogpost, as reported by GMA News Online's Victor Rosero, he recounted: "From 1993 to 1994 I never drew anything. I went back to Architecture and worked as a draftsman and construction supervisor. I thought comics and I were done. But if comics is in your blood there's no discouragement strong enough to keep you from drawing. And I eventually went back."

=== Wasted ===
Alanguilan studied to become an architect, but turned his hobby of comic book illustration into a career to be with his then-girlfriend. At first, much of Alanguilan's work in comics was on conventional American superhero titles. His first self-written comic was Wasted, originally intended for only his friends to read, and was later embarrassed by the large amounts of violence and profanity in it.

He published Wasted in the Philippines from July 1994 through July 1996, and from there its popularity spread to the United States, where it was praised by Warren Ellis, and established him as an independent comics creator.

=== Work with Image, Marvel, and DC ===
In the mid-1990s, Alanguilan began to be known as an inker for American comic book titles like Wetworks, X-Men, Superman: Birthright, Wolverine, High Roads, Fantastic Four, and Silent Dragon, sometimes working alongside fellow Filipino comic book creators Leinil Francis Yu and Whilce Portacio.

His first break in a major US comics publishing house was with Image Comics, for whose Wildstorm imprint he began inking several titles – including Wetworks, Hazard, and Grifter – in 1996.

Alanguilan then got his first opportunity to work for Marvel Comics in 1997, inking Leinil Francis Yu's pencils on Wolverine Volume 2 No. 121, written by Warren Ellis.

Alanguilan's first work for DC Comics was when he inked Superman: Birthright, whose first issue came out in September 2003, with Mark Waid and Leinil Yu.

After a long sabbatical from mainstream comics, Alanguilan, partnered again with Leinil Yu in 2012 on the art for Mark Millar's Supercrooks.

=== Elmer ===
In 2006, Alanguilan self-published a four-issue miniseries titled "Elmer," depicting a world in which chickens suddenly gain intelligence and the ability to speak like humans. It was collected and released as a trade paperback in 2009. In 2010, it was published in France by Editions Ca Et La and North America by Slave Labor Graphics. It eventually won the French ACBD Prix Asie (Asia Prize for Criticism) Award and the Prix Quai des Bulles Award in 2011. It was also nominated for the 2011 Best New Graphic Album Eisner Award.

In 2020, It was listed 100 in the top 100 of the best graphic novel of the XXIst century by The Angoulême BD Festival.

=== TIMAWA ===
From 2007 to 2009, Alanguilan's adventure graphic novel TIMAWA was serialized in Buzz Magazine, earning a nomination as 2009 comic book series of the year at the 2009 Komikon Awards.

=== Restoration of Francisco Coching's El Indio ===
From 2004 to 2009, Alanguilan worked to digitally restore Francisco V. Coching's 1952 work "El Indio" after borrowing the original prints from Coching's Family. This was eventually published by Vibal Publishing, and was influential in Coching eventually being recognized as a National Artist of the Philippines.

=== Darna Lives! ===
In 2011 Alanguilan partnered with Arnold Arre to write a 9-page concept piece called "Darna Lives!", which reimagined the life of the iconic Philippine Komiks character Darna. Alanguilan wrote the story and Arre providing the art for the piece, which portrayed Darna's alter-ego Narda having forgotten her superhero identity and moved on to a life of obscurity and poverty, until fate intervenes to bring back. Although short, it was notable for its significantly different portrayal of the character, since it was the first time the Narda alter-ego was portrayed as anything but a demure young woman.

Commenting on the work in a Philippine Daily Inquirer interview, Alanguilan explained his motivations for coming out with the story: "I think Arnold and I were able to show that Darna, as a character, can stand to be interpreted differently to allow her to remain appealing and relevant to a new audience. I hope 'Darna Lives' can push for this kind of change. I think Filipinos, as we have seen, are open too it, and comics creators and filmmakers do not need to keep relying on old tricks and gimmicks that have worked before. I hope it can push our storytellers in other media, especially TV and movies to be bolder. 'Di mage-gets ng masa yan' ('The masses won't understand that') is a stupid, cowardly statement that ensures nothing but stagnancy."

=== Rodski Patotski ===
In 2014, Alanguilan collaborated with Arnold Arre again to release the graphic novel Rodski Patotski: Ang Dalagang Baby. Written by Alanguilan and illustrated by Arre, the Philippines' National Book Development Board awarded Rodski Patotski with that year's National Book Award under the category of Best Book of Graphic Literature in English.

=== Bakokak ===
In 2017, Alanguilan and Kevin Ray Valentino published Bakokak, a 92-page graphic novel in which a giant frog, mutated by the Fukushima Daiichi nuclear disaster in Japan, arrives and threatens the Philippines. Alanguilan wrote the story, and did the inks and colors for the cover.

=== Other works ===
Alanguilan also created several other titles which were published in various Filipino publications, such as Johnny Balbona for Mango Comics' humor publication "Mwahaha", and Humanis Rex! in Fudge Magazine. He collaborated with architect Arlan Esmeña to publish the graphic novel Where Bold Stars go to Die. He also contributed to local landmark anthologies Siglo: Freedom, Siglo: Passion and Filipino Komiks. In 2007, he created an autobiographical slice-of-life webcomic called Crest Hut Butt Shop, based on an earlier minicomic of the same name.

=== Critical and industry reception ===
His self-created titles attracted fans including comic creators Neil Gaiman and Warren Ellis.

== Komiks advocacy ==
Alanguilan worked hard to promote Komiks as an art form appreciated by Filipinos, notably playing an important part in re-familiarizing the public with the work of Francisco Coching, leading to Coching's posthumous elevation to National Artist of the Philippines in 2014. He was also one of the leading voices in the protest against the conferment of the award to Carlo J. Caparas in 2009, which was finally voided by the Philippine Supreme court in 2013.

== Komikero Artists Group ==
In 2002, Alanguilan organized an informal group of artists based in Laguna Province to create the Laguna Artists Group, which was soon renamed as the Komikero Artists Group. This group began simply as a group that would meet on the shores of Sampaloc lake to discuss komiks, but would later organize the San Pablo City Comics Festivals, which became a precursor of many later comics conventions in the Philippines. The influential group include Jonas Diego and Johnny Danganan, who would later serve as the visual inspiration for the titular character in Alanguilan's Johnny Balbona.

=== San Pablo City Comics Festivals ===
In 2003, the Komikero Artists Group organized the San Pablo City Comics Festival, at the Mariño Residence along Sampalok Lake in San Pablo City, with the aim of showcasing original komiks art works past and present. Alanguilan noted that "mini-comics conventions" had been happening in the Philippines as early as 1994. But the San Pablo City Comics Festival marked the first time such a convention happened outside Manila. It also became the precursor to the annual Komikon Comics Convention, which had its first run in the Bahay ng Alumni in UP Diliman a year later, in 2004.

Alanguilan played an active role in organizing the second San Pablo City Comics Festival, which took place at the San Pablo City Lion's Club along Sampalok Lake in 2009. The third run of the festival saw the Komikero Artists Group collaborating with the UPLB Graphic Literature Guild and holding the festival at the Ultimart Shopping Center, which is at the center of San Pablo City. The Fourth San Pablo City Comics Festival was held on 20 January 2019 – less than a year before Alanguilan died.

== Komikero Komiks Museum ==
In 2016, Alanguilan founded the Komikero Komiks Museum, a brick-and-mortar museum in his hometown of San Pablo City, which he said was meant "to show our countrymen our rich history in the medium as well as to showcase the talent that we have." It featured original art from early Philippine comic book industry leaders including Alfredo Alcala, Francisco Coching, Alex Niño, Steve Gan, Nestor Redondo, Tony Velasquez, and Hal Santiago. Alanguilan curated the museum until his death in 2019.

== "Hey, Baby" meme ==
In 2009, he made a one-minute video titled "Hey, Baby", which consists mainly of him making comically lecherous facial expressions at his webcam. This video became popular on YouTube, and was featured on 25 January 2011 episode of American television show Tosh.0. Clips from the video were used in several episodes of Russell Howard's Good News, often in response to the host asking questions like "What kind of creepy weirdo would come up with that?" In October 2010, Alanguilan was declared "The Greatest Man on the Internet" by video blogger Ray William Johnson. His creepy smiling face was also a popular meme in Indonesia, known as Ayo sini sama om ("come here to uncle"), usually used for comic effect combined with other memes. As of 2019, the video had been viewed over 6 million times.

== Other works ==
Alanguilan co-produced the 2012 documentary Illustrated By: Filipino Invasion of US Comics. The project began as a short film featuring Gerry Alanguilan's career and passion for comics. It evolved into a full-length film featuring notable Filipino comics artists who worked broke into the US mainstream.

He also played the role of a human trafficker in Tin-tin,15, a short film created in 2010 to increase awareness of child trafficking in the Philippines.

== Death ==
Alanguilan died on 21 December 2019 at the age of 51 in San Pablo City, Laguna, Philippines. In the weeks leading up to his death, he wrote posts on his blog about his struggles with participating in conventions and living with disability. Despite this, he continued to work on his comics until his death.

== Legacy ==
Alanguilan is considered a vanguard of what has been called the "new wave" or "renaissance" of Philippine comics in the 1990s and 2000s. By that time, Philippine publishing industry had gone into decline, resulting in Philippine-made comic books disappearing from newsstands. But the rise of independent publications like Alanguilan's "Wasted" eventually gave rise to a growing culture of "indie" comics.

== Awards ==
- 2011
  - Winner (for Elmer) Quai des Bulles – Ouest France 2011, St. Malo, France
  - Winner, Best Asian Album (for Elmer), Prix-Asie ACBD, France 2011
  - Nominee, Best New Album (for Elmer), Will Eisner Industry Awards, USA, 2011
  - Global Pinoy Awardee, SM Calamba, 2011
- 2010
  - Gawad Pinakamaningnining na Alagad ng Sining (Visual Arts), 2010
  - Outstanding San Pableño for Visual Arts, 2010
