= Philippine comics =

- Earliest publications: 1920s
- Publications: Kulafu; Og; Darna; D. I. Trece
- Creators: Tony Velasquez; Tony DeZuniga; Nestor Redondo; Mars Ravelo; Alex Niño
- Languages: Filipino; Tagalog

Philippine comic books (Filipino: Komiks) is widely popular throughout the nation from the early-20th-century to the present. Comics scholar John A. Lent posited that the Philippine comics tradition has "the strongest audience appeal, best-known cartooning geniuses, and most varied comics content" in Asia after Japan and Hong Kong.

The origins of Philippine comic strips trace back to the early 20th century, and Comic books gained widespread readership after World War II. These early comics were deeply rooted in Western styles and formats, yet they possessed a distinctive character as melodramas enjoyed by both children and adults. Marked by ornate, baroque illustrations drawn in thick lines, Philippine comics peaked in popularity as a national pastime during the 1980s. They also served as source material for movies, as well as for promoting government initiatives, especially for propaganda and satirical cartoons. However, by the end of the 20th century, public interest began to wane, with alternative forms of entertainment such as television and the Internet taking precedence, leading to the decline of nationally distributed comic books. Subsequently, self-publishing and independent publishers flourished, and comics communities formed through conventions. The emergence of webcomics provided a new avenue for publishing works.

== History ==
=== Origin: 19th century–World War II ===
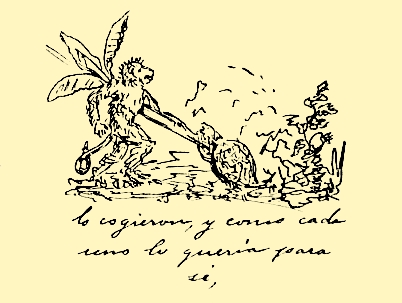
One of the illustrations by José Rizal depicting the folk tale The Turtle and the Monkey (Tagalog: Ang Pagong at ang Matsing or Si Pagong at si Matsing).

Some believe that the origin of indigenous Philippine cartoons can be traced back to the independence activist José Rizal. Rizal privately created several picture stories, with one notable example being his 1885 illustrated rendition of the Filipino folktale The Turtle and the Monkey, which featured a combination of words and pictures akin to modern cartoons.

As in many countries, commercial cartooning in the Philippines originated with single-panel political cartoons in satirical periodicals. Magazines and newspapers such as Te con Leche and El Tio Verdades during the Spanish colonial period, followed by Lipang Kalabaw and the Philippines Free Press under the American rule, extensively criticized both the colonial powers and the local government through cartoons. Early political cartoons personified the nation as "Filipinas", a naive maiden courted by Uncle Sam, who later was replaced by Juan dela Cruz, a slipper-wearing common man introduced by Jorge Pineda in The Independent. Noteworthy painters of this era, such as Fernando Amorsolo and Botong Francisco, were also known for their cartooning.

The weekly Liwayway, the first literary magazine in the Philippines, introduced its first comic strip in 1929. Titled Mga Kabalbalan ni Kenkoy (Misadventures of Kenkoy), the strip was centered around Kenkoy, a Filipino trying to imitate Americans. This notable character was created by writer Romualdo Ramos and by illustrator Tony Velasquez, who was 18 years old at the time, by commission from publisher Ramon Roces. The short comic swiftly expanded to occupy a full-color page, then advanced into the magazine's various language editions. The moniker "Kenkoy" was ingrained into the Filipino vernacular as a term meaning "someone who is boisterously hilarious, funny or amusing", and the character persisted in comics and visual media well into the 21st century. Velasquez has come to be called "father of Filipino comics," partly due to his role as a publisher in later years, providing numerous creators with a platform to publish their works.

During the 1930s, Filipino comics heavily mirrored American comic strips. José Zabala-Santos was renowned for his Popeye-inspired creations, Lukas Marakas and Popoy. The first adventure comic, Francisco Reyes' Kulafu, featured a Tarzan-esque hero in the jungles of Luzon during the pre-Spanish era. Amidst the pressures of westernization, such pseudo-historical adventures continued to captivate audiences in the Philippines.

During the Pacific War, Manila fell under Japanese military control in January 1942. Japanese military authorities enforced a ban on local newspapers, while utilizing Roces family-owned publications such as Liwayway and The Tribune for propaganda. American comic strips including The Lone Ranger and Fritzi Ritz, which had been serialized in The Tribune, were replaced by The Boy 'Pilipino' by Japanese cartoonist Keizo Shimada and The KALIBAPI Family by Tony Velasquez. These works, subject to censorship by the Japanese Propaganda Corps, promoted assimilation programs such as Japanese language education and suggested ways to address shortages in supplies.

=== Golden age: 1940s–1950s ===
After World War II, Filipino publishers began to adopt the format of American comic books, influenced by the abundance of comics in American soldiers' garrisons. Unlike the single-story format common in the U.S., these Filipino periodicals were typically anthologies ranging from 36 to 45 pages. Leading this trend was Halakhak Komiks, a short-lived weekly publication launched by Tony Velasquez in 1946. Subsequently, in 1947, Ramon Roces established Ace Publications, appointing Velasquez as editor-in-chief. Ace introduced Pilipino Komiks, and several others including Tagalog Klasiks, Hiwaga Komiks, and Espcsyal Komiks. As these bi-weekly magazines became popular, they evolved into weekly and then semiweekly publications. Initial circulation began at 10,000 copies, eventually exceeding 100,000. By 1950, other publishers entered the industry, and general magazines began devoting special issues to comics. Additionally, translated U.S. comics became increasingly common. While many of these publishers faced various challenges and industry fluctuations, Roces and his family would remain a dominant figure in the comic book industry for decades.

Filipino comics experienced a golden age during the 1950s, as affordable comic books became widely available at street newsstands and general stores (sari-sari stores), gradually supplanting literary magazines. While American titles like Superman, Archie, and MAD, sold in supermarkets and bookstores, were primarily consumed by the middle classes, homegrown comics were embraced by the common people. Most creators did not hail from the intellectual elite either. Due to the shared pool of writers, Filipino comics inherited the characteristic of didactic melodrama from popular literatures. Initially serving as a means of escapism from reality, comics evolved over time, with stories growing more sophisticated and diverse genres emerging through the 1980s.

From their inception, comics faced criticism from conservative and religious groups due to perceived lowbrow content. In 1954, following the establishment of the Comics Code in the U.S. comics industry, the Association of Publishers and Editors of Philippine Comics-Magazines (APEPCOM) was formed, spearheaded by Ace. Collaborating with the Catholic Church, APEPCOM implemented a self-regulatory code aimed at excluding "filth harmful to morals," such as explicit sex, horror, and criminal activities, from their works. Consequently, Filipino comics would persist in avoiding offensive or vulgar humor until the 21st century, predominantly focusing on simple humor and political satire.

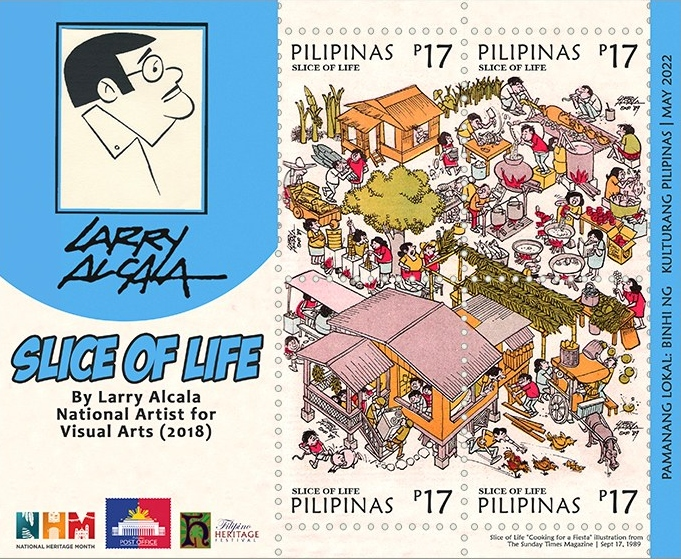
A stamp sheet highlighting Slice of Life by Larry Alcala, issued in 2022.

During this era, many artists emerged who would shape the history of Philippine comics. Francisco Coching, a World War II guerrilla fighter, established the indigenous style of Philippine comics with his dynamic and intricate drawings. Nicknamed "the Dean of Philippine comics," Coching was posthumously honored with a National Artist award. Larry Alcala left a lasting legacy with his 56-year career, notably through his Slice of Life, a single-panel comic strip series portraying daily life in the Philippines without dialogue. Alcala was also bestowed with the title of National Artist. Mars Ravelo introduced the iconic Filipino superhero, Darna. Ravelo's other creations, such as Captain Barbell, Lastikman, (Note: These superheroes were inspired by American characters. Darna was conceived as a female Filipino version of Superman, Captain Barbell was based on Captain Marvel, while Lastikman was inspired by Plastic Man.) the mermaid Dyesebel, and the humorous character Bondying, have seen remakes in the 21st century, captivating a new generation of readers. Other notable figures include Alfredo Alcala, Clodualdo del Mundo, Nestor Redondo, Alex Niño, Pablo S. Gomez, and Jesse Santos.

=== Regulation under the dictatorship, outflow of talent to the U.S.: 1960s–1970s ===
When the Ace Publication went bankrupt in 1963 following a printers' strike, creators who had contributed the company ventured into their own business endeavors. Velasquez managed GASI (Graphic Arts Services Incorporated) with Roces' support. Pablo Gomez and Mars Ravelo established their respective publishing houses PSG (1964) and RAR (1970) releasing several weekly titles. However, many new entrants into the comic book industry often faced instability, partly due to the sluggish Philippine economy. Larry Alcala reflected on this period, noting that overproduction led to a decline in quality, marking the end of the golden age.

The "bomba" and "developmental comics" are genres unique to the Philippines that emerged in the 1960s. Bomba comics, published by ephemeral publishers, featured pornographic stories, nude photos, and occasional political messages. Despite facing condemnation from religious and feminist groups, bomba magazines remained popular until they were forced underground following intensified enforcement measures during martial law from 1972 onwards. Developmental comics, published by public agencies, aimed to raise awareness about family planning and were reported for their impact on population control. Comics were also utilized as a tool for government public relations. During the presidency of Corazon Aquino in the late 1980s, comics were used to disseminate messages urging communist guerrillas to surrender, camouflaged as romance stories, and distributed nationwide.

In the 1970s, Filipino artists began penetrating the U.S. market, pioneered by Tony DeZuniga, a Filipino immigrant based in New York. Recruited by DC Comics editor Joe Orlando in 1970, DeZuniga would create the western hero Jonah Hex and contribute to Conan the Barbarian, as well as various romance, horror, and war titles. In 1971, DeZuniga recommended DC publisher Carmine Infantino to visit the Philippines to scout for new talent at moderate rates. This initiative resulted in a significant outflux of Filipino artists, including Alex Niño, Nestor Redondo and Alfredo Alcala. Renowned for their drawing proficiency, speed, and diverse artistic range, Filipino artists became a major presence in American comics. However, as reader preferences shifted in the 1980s, many Filipino artists transitioned to alternative career paths, such as animation.

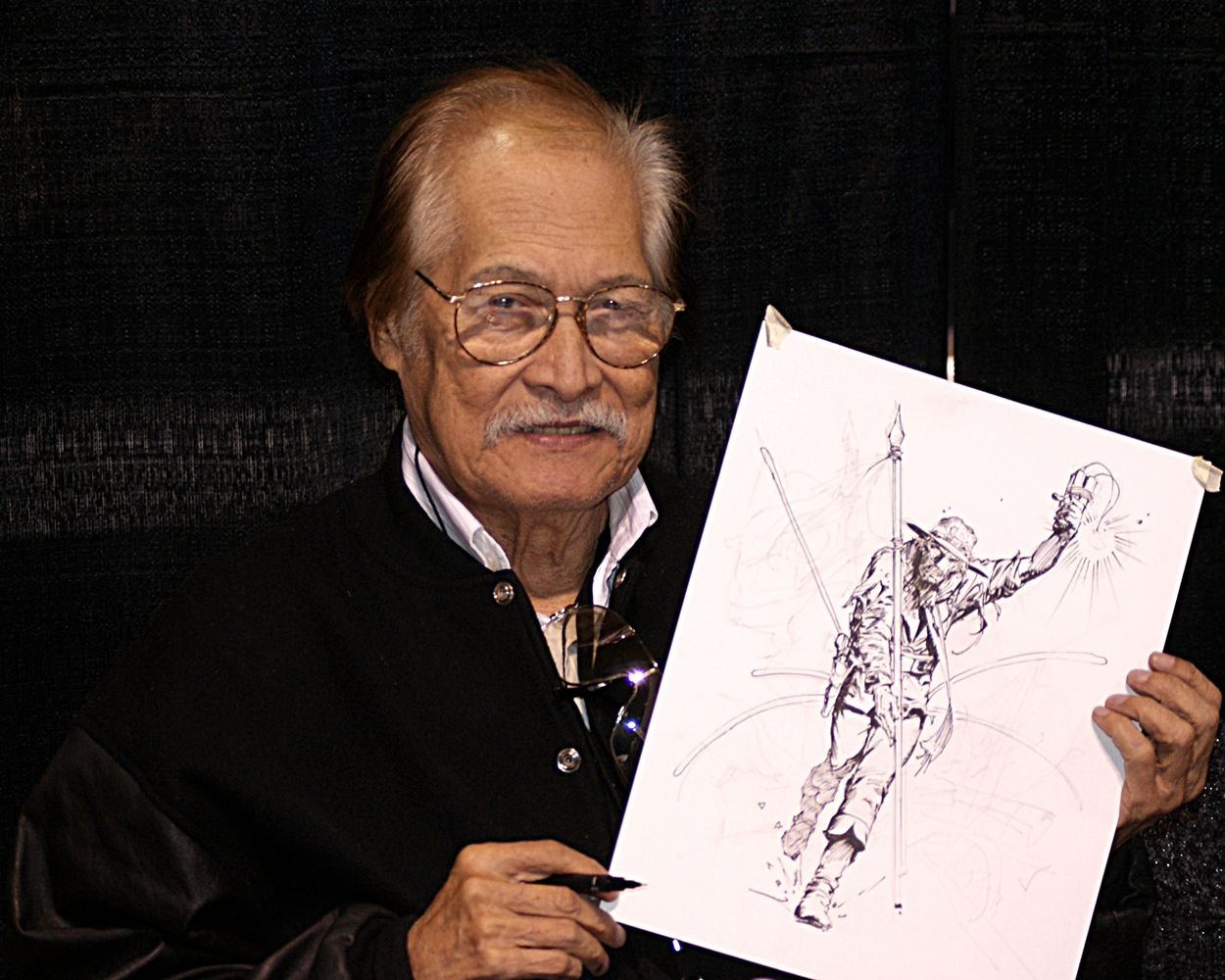
Tony DeZuniga (pictured in 2011) has made a name for himself in the U.S. as a prolific comic artist.

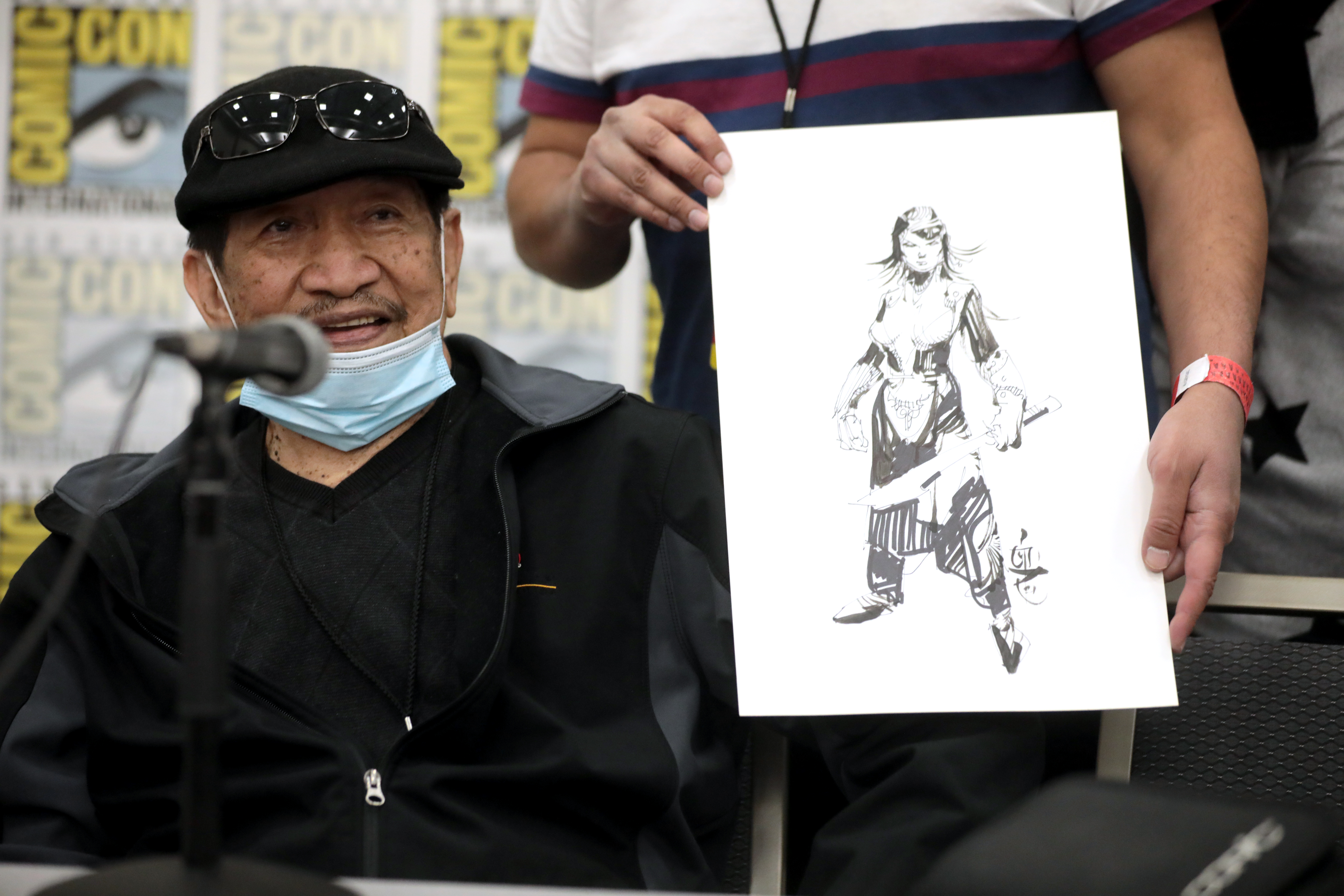
Alex Niño (pictured in 2021) was inducted into the Eisner Award Hall of Fame in 2022.

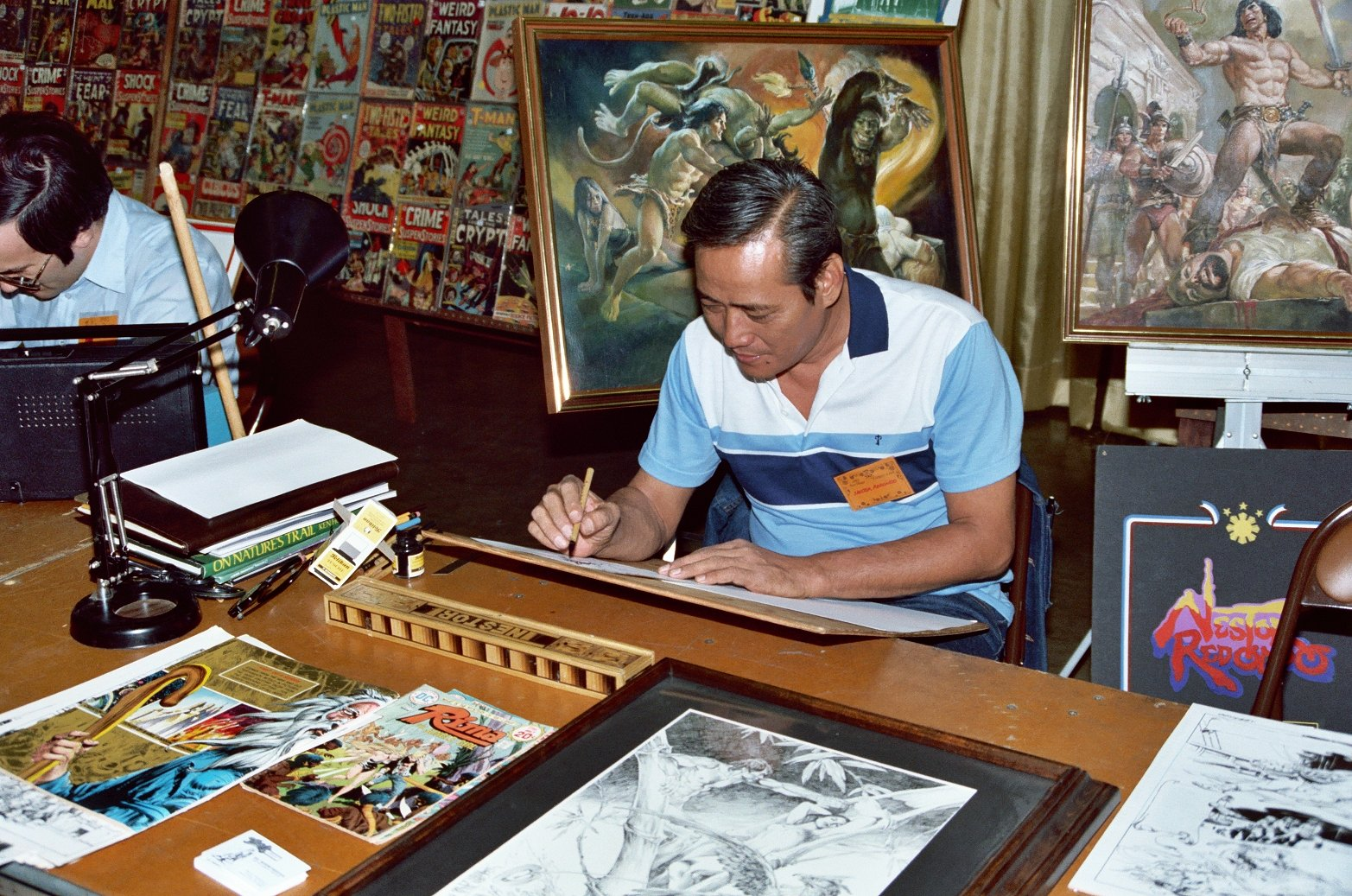
Nestor Redondo at 1982 San Diego Comic-Con.

In 1972, Ferdinand Marcos' administration imposed martial law, forcing all publishers to align with a pro-regime stance. The administration recognized the significant influence of comics on public opinion and published comics to promote its policies, while establishing The Media Advisory Council to regulate the content of comics. The comics industry complied, leading to a disappearance of works depicting poverty or social unrest from their pages. Although the Philippines had previously enjoyed an exceptional level of freedom for political satire among Southeast Asian countries, political cartoonists critical of the government began to be ostracized. Newspaper and magazines under Marcos' influence carried humorous cartoons devoid of political commentary, fostering a flourishing of the genre. Nonoy Marcelo, among those blacklisted, evaded censorship by joining the state-run media agency, and infused subtle political satire into his cartoons featuring his rat character Ikabod. Eventually Marcos was overthrown in 1986, yet satirical cartoons did not regain their former prominence, as media conglomerates increasingly excluded content deemed detrimental to business interests.

The 1970s presented multiple challenges for the Philippine comics industry. Alongside losing talent to the higher-paying American counterpart, (Note: Tony DeZuniga recollected that Filipino artists at the time had received 50 cents per page in the Philippines, whereas DC Comics had paid $12.) the industry faced criticism from the administration and the Catholic Church regarding perceived 'harmful' content, not to mention economic recession. While several weaker publishers succumbed to these pressures, companies such as GASI and Atlas, owned by Ramon Roces, continued to thrive. GASI's circulation and revenues quadrupled between 1975 and 1978.

=== Decline of the industry: The 1980s–1990s ===
The popularity or Philippine comics reached its peak in the 1980s, marked by the publication of 47 weekly comic books and a total circulation of 2.5 to 3 million copies by the mid-1980s. The actual readership far exceeded these figures due to the conventionalized sharing of copies among friends and families, making comics the most widely consumed form of publishing, even surpassing newspapers. With a national distribution network under its ownership, Roces continued to hold a dominant position, owning 62 out of 71 titles in the market by 1992. The publishing model established by the Roces family, characterized by the short publication periods, a wide array of titles, and affordable prices, faced minimal challenges from smaller publishers. However, this oligopoly led to a conservative approach to content, often favoring recycled ideas over innovation. The relentless pursuit of production speed resulted in a decline in quality, exemplified by writer Carlo Caparas who once produced 36 works (typically 4 pages each) on a weekly basis, while another artist completed 19 works per week with assistance for the pen work.

In the 1990s, economic instability, political turmoil, and natural disasters strained family finances, resulted in sharp decline in comic book sales. Concurrently, new forms of entertainment including television, video games, the Internet, and foreign comics, further intensified competition. Furthermore, the departure of top artists for other industries or overseas opportunities, combined with outdated printing and binding techniques, contributed to the industry's struggles. To address the downturn in the market, comic book publishers employed various strategies, including the integration of Japanese anime and video game aesthetics into children's titles and the incorporation of adult humor. These measures offered only temporary respite. Some of the longest-running titles in the world, notably the initial four founded by Tony Velasquez around 1950, which collectively amassed 11,500 issues, ceased publication during this period.

The passing of industry titan Ramon Roces in 1993 signaled a pivotal moment. Following his death, Roces family-owned businesses either folded or discontinued comics publication entirely. Many argue that Philippine comics died during this period. As one critic noted, "When the Roces comics monopoly fell in the late 1990s, it took everything with it." Although comics publishing persisted, the dissolution of the Roces distribution network significantly diminished the industry and compelled a shift in publishing style. Many artists opted for self-publishing avenues, such as Pol Medina Jr., who reprinted his newspaper serial Pugad Baboy as graphic novels.

=== New waves: 1990s–2000s ===
In the 1990s, a new trend emerged as artists began to self-publish photocopied minicomics, predominantly within the American-style superhero genre, often selling them at campus festivals. Alamat Comics, founded in 1994 as a small convention for independent creators to connect, eventually expanded to formally publish works such as Wasted by Gerry Alanguilan. Mango Comics and other publishers also emerged, signifying a generational change in comic book publishing.

Many young artists were inspired to break into American comics industry by Whilce Portacio, a Filipino immigrant who had achieved success in America. Portacio made regular visits to his home country in the early 1990s, engaging with and mentoring local artists, including the Alamat group. The studio Portacio founded in Manila has nurtured talents such as Alanguilan and Leinil Francis Yu, both of whom have subsequently contributed to Marvel Comics.

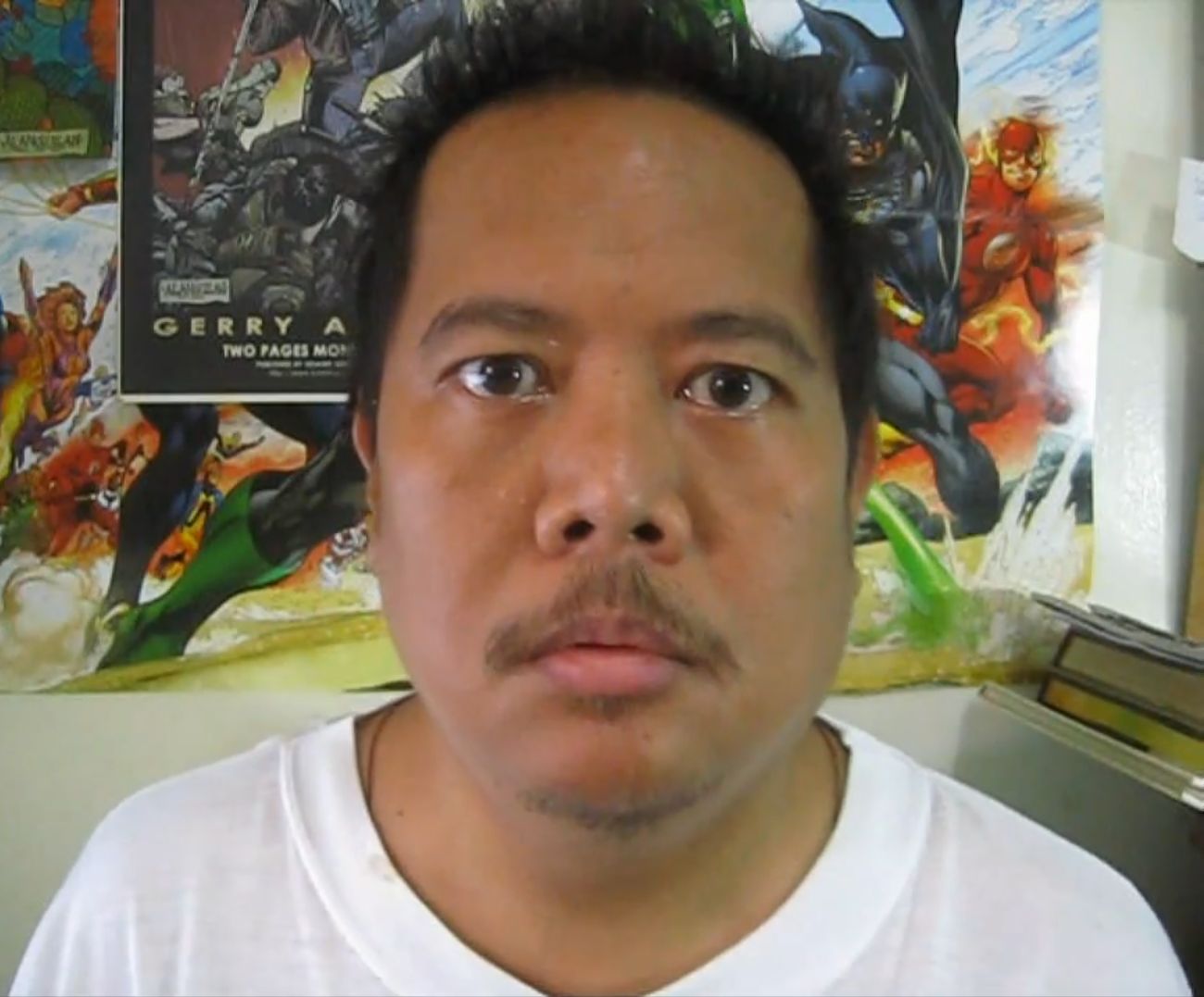
Born in 1968, Gerry Alanguilan became a pioneer in the Philippine comics revival.

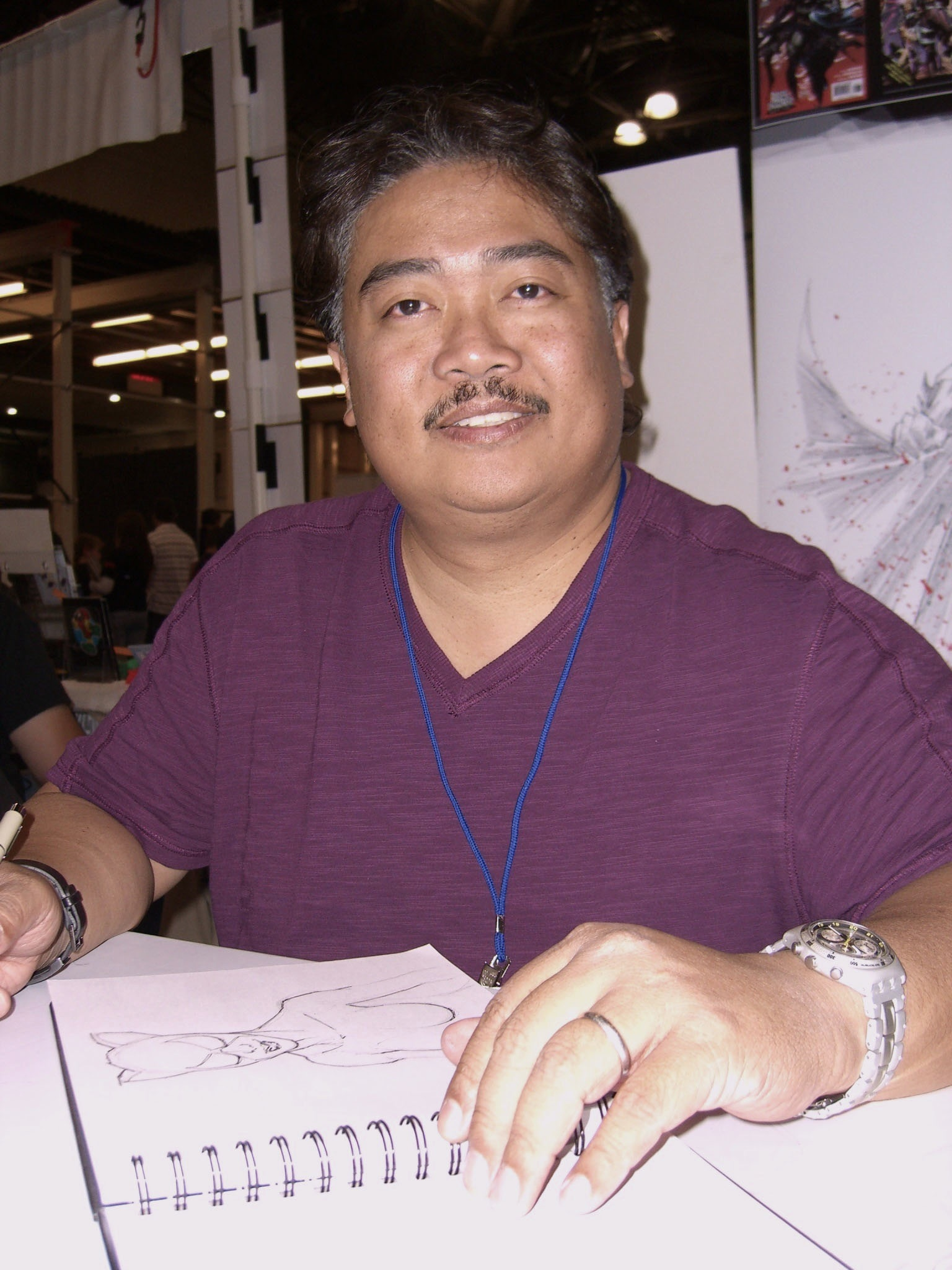
Whilce Portacio co-founded Image Comics in the U.S. in 1992.

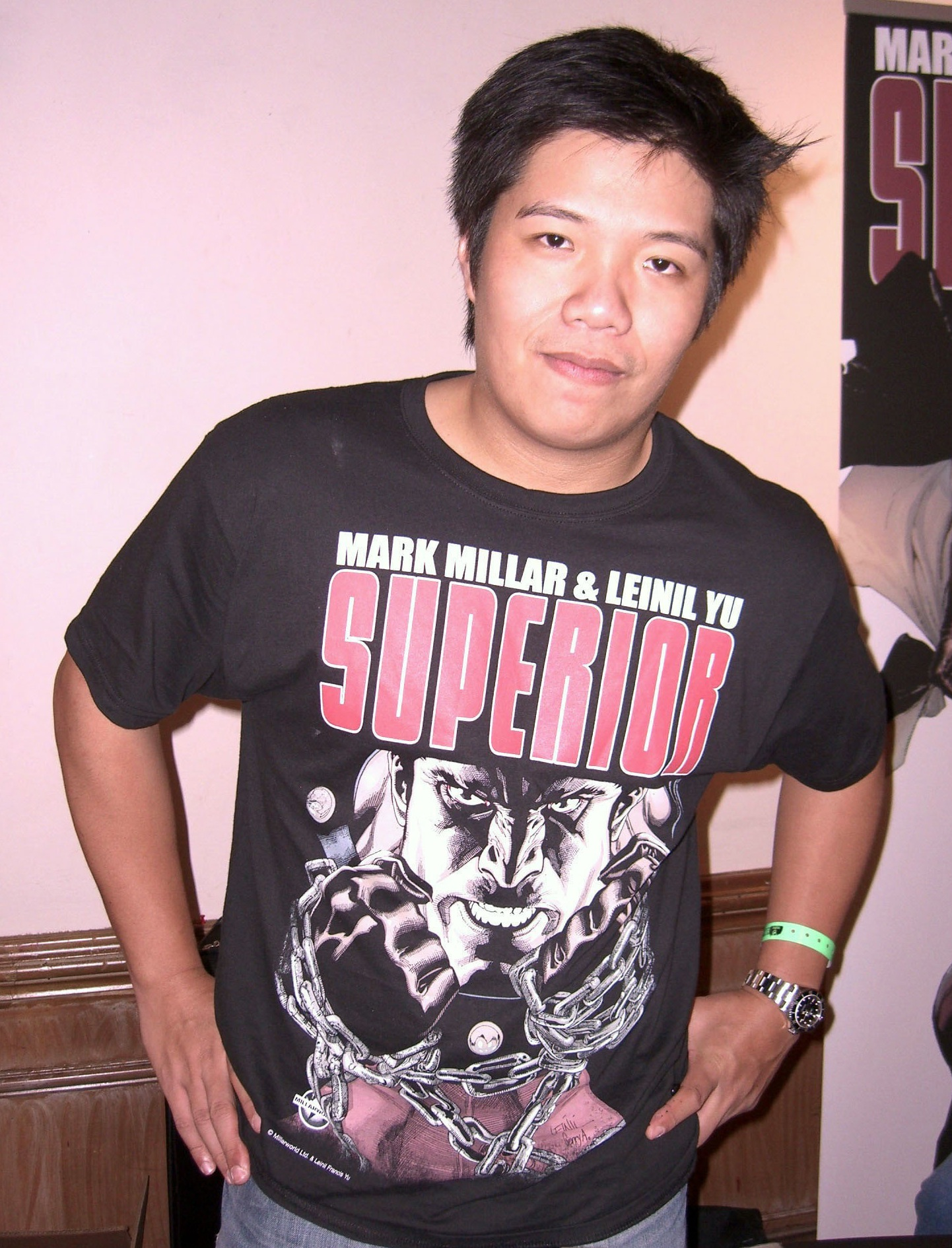
Leinil Francis Yu undertook the pencil work for the popular U.S. title Wolverine in 1998.

During the 2000s, comic publishing styles diversified, with more artists taking on works from non-comic or international publishers, alongside the trend of self-publishing. The latter facilitated the creation of a broader range of works. In the late 2000s, Alanguilan self-published Elmer, a social drama featuring intelligent chickens, earning a nomination for the prestigious Eisner Award.

Graphic novels emerged as a viable alternative to the traditional weekly comic books. Notable works like Trese by Alamat member Budjette Tan and Kajo Baldisimo, The Mythology Class and Trip to Tagaytay by Arnold Arre, and One Night in Purgatory by Carlo Vergara have been released in book form by mainstream publishers. Vergara's queer superhero Zsazsa Zaturnnah, created in 2002, gained widespread popularity, leading to its adaptation into a movie and a musical theater production.

The 1990s also witnessed a surge in influence from Japanese manga and anime. This trend can be traced back to the 1970s when anime titles such as Voltes V and G-Force had gained popularity among expanding television audience of the middle class. However, the momentum of the anime boom was hindered when the Marcos administration banned these series, though the reasons for these restrictions remain debated. (Note: According to comics scholar Cheng Chua, there are multiple perspectives regarding Marcos' ban of Anime: some suggest that the storyline of Voltes V, which portrayed revolt against oppression, was deemed dangerous; others argue it was part of a clampdown on non-state broadcasting stations; while some attribute it to pressure from Catholic women's groups advocating against the depiction of violence.) In the late 1980s, following a regime change, anime experienced a resurgence with the airing of Dragon Ball Z and Sailor Moon. However, it wasn't until the late 1990s that anime truly permeated the general public. The popular comedy show Bubble Gang played a significant role in this by featuring Voltes V, evoking memories of the military regime and contributing to anime's broader appeal.

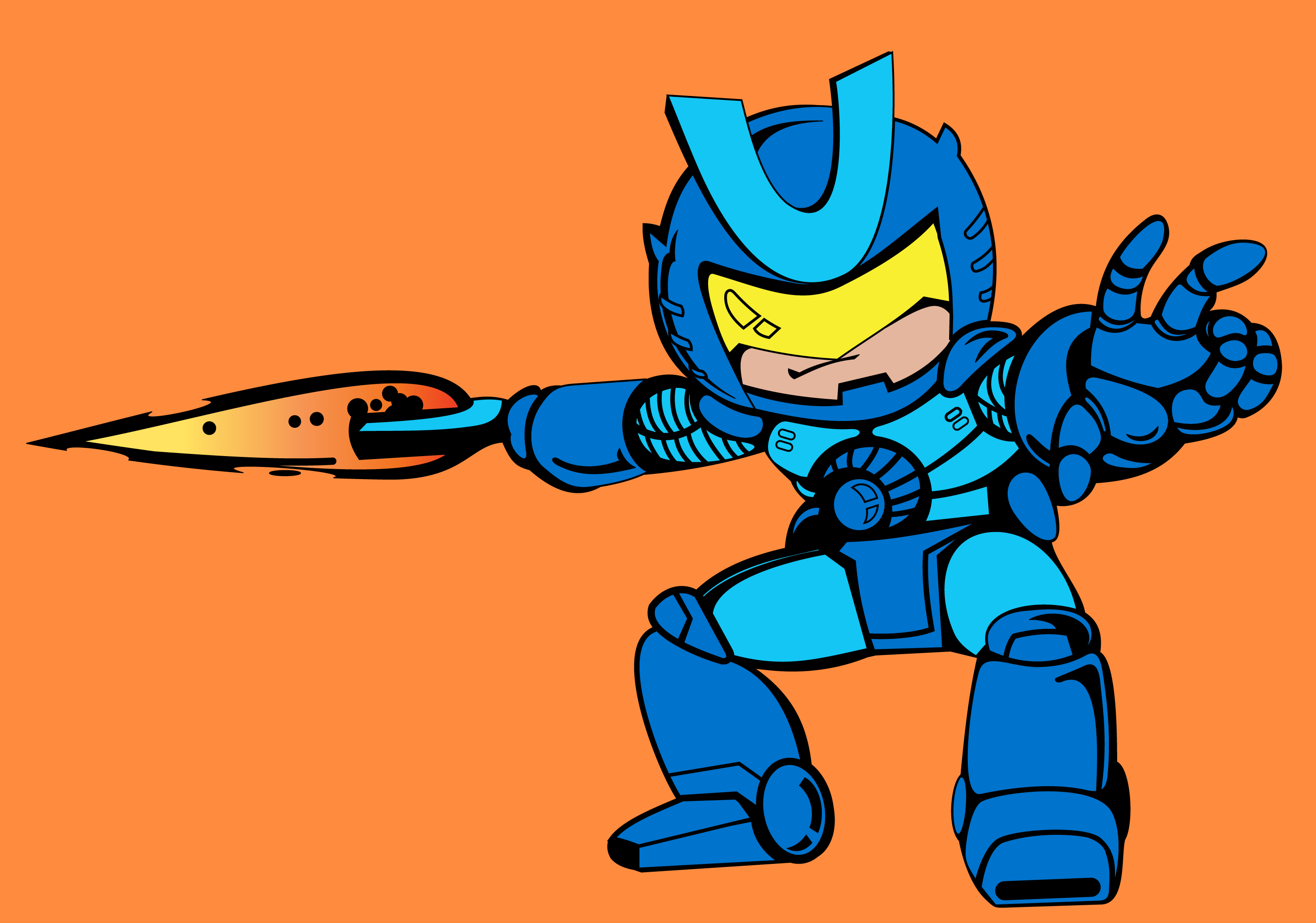
Amid the market contraction, Combatron capitalized on the popularity of video game series Mega Man, becoming a hit.

Japanese subculture captivated a younger generation distinct from traditional comics readers. In 2000, Culture Crash Comics debuted, showcasing high-quality manga-inspired works. Although the magazine did not last long due to financial difficulties, its popularity spurred the emergence of followers such as Mangaholix by the same publisher, alongside Questor and Nautilus Comics. Superhero comic publisher Mango Comics launched the shōjo title Mango Jam. Even longstanding children's magazines such as Funny Komiks adopted manga-style illustrations. These creations by Filipino artists, dubbed "Pinoy manga," marked an era of "comics, komiks, and manga" (works in the American, Filipino, and Japanese styles). Notable Pinoy manga works include Love is in the Bag by Ace Vitangcol.

The Japanese government actively promoted manga as a cultural export in the Philippines as in other Asian nations. The reception of Japanese manga has sparked controversial, mirroring debates in other nations. Alanguilan has criticized Filipino professional manga artists for adopting styles closely associated with Japanese cultural identity, labeling them as "Filipino".

As new developments unfolded, efforts to revive traditional Filipino comics were also underway. Mango Comics rebooted old superheroes like Darna, Lastikman, and Captain Barbell around 2003. Targeting a higher-income demographic, Mango opted to distribute through comic book specialty stores rather than newsstands. In 2007, the company embarked on an unsuccessful venture into mass-market weekly comic books, setting filmmaker and writer Carlo Caparas as a spokesperson. Caparas himself promoted Philippine comics through initiatives such as establishing awards for new creators and organizing the Artist Training Caravan to bolster the local comics scene. He also initiated the National Komiks Congress and the Komiks Caravan with support from the National Commission for Culture and the Arts to elevate awareness of comics within the country.

=== 2010s–present ===
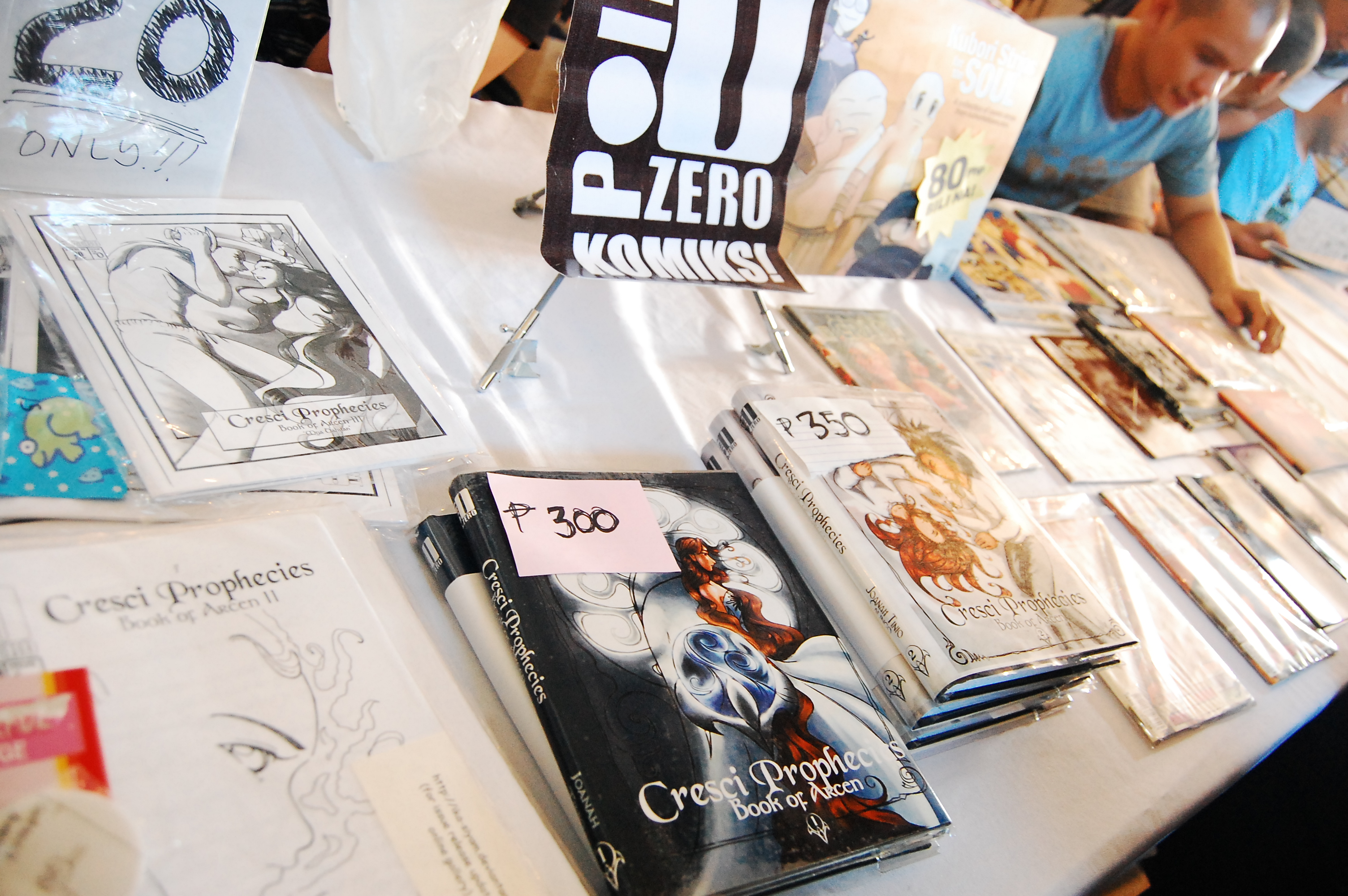
Works by Filipino artists are sold at conventions.

In the 2010s, comics further diversified in content and publication formats. Since the establishment of Komikon in 2005, conventions for fans of subcultures such as comics, anime, and video games have become regular events throughout the Philippines. These conventions serve as vital platforms for indie artists to distribute their works. Online fan activities have thrived, enabling greater exposure to international influences and creating new avenues for publication. Several platforms originating in the Philippines, such as Penlab, Webkom Alliance, and Kudlis, allow amateurs to publish webcomics. Some artists have found recognition on Korean webtoons. Veteran artists including Pol Medina Jr. have ventured into online publishing and monetization. The anime adaptation of Budjette Tan's Trese, released on Netflix in 2021, attracted international attention.

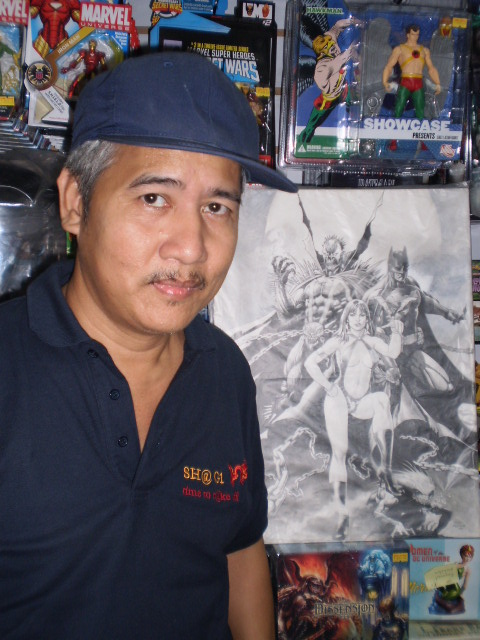
Lan Medina was awarded an Eisner Award in 2003 for his contribution to the U.S. comic series Fables.。

The evolution of comics culture has facilitated a surge in female creators. In the past, comic artists operated within an apprenticeship-like dynamic, often excluding women. However, with the rise of a new generation influenced by Western comics and manga such as Sailor Moon and Clamp, independent comics by female artists have become more common. Despite the persistent male dominance in the comics landscape of the 2020s, events like Komiket actively empower and support women's creative pursuits.

Comics are increasingly acknowledged as an art form, with frequent retrospectives honoring early artists like Ravelo and Coching. In 2010, a bill was introduced for a graphic novel archiving project. Comic creation is now being integrated into university curricula, and student groups are actively fostering emerging comic book artists. While circulation numbers may not reach previous highs, the comics culture is experiencing a resurgence in the 21st century. Comics with boy's love genre focusing on the lived experiences of the Filipino queer community have become popular in the country in recent years, while queer comic festivals have become mainstream every Pride Month.

== Formats ==
The traditional format of Philippine comic book was firmly established by the 1990s. These books typically spanned 32 to 48 pages in color and were priced at 17 to 20 U.S. cents. Each weekly issue consisted of several short stories (wakasan) and serials (nobela), each running four pages in length. During the 1970s, each magazine featured signature long serials, with Anak ni Zuma in Aliwan Komiks standing out as a prominent example that remained popular for over a decade. Additionally, these comics books featured crossword puzzles, short gags, letter sections, advertisements, and prose sections covering topics such as celebrity gossip, biographies, and life hacks. The title of comics was often straightforward, employing everyday objects, the main character's name (in accordance with the Filipino convention of "characteristic + first name"), or wordplay based on the name of a celebrity.

Comic books were sold through newsstands. It is estimated that each copy was read by six to ten individuals due to the accessibility of street lending shops and the practice of sharing within families and among neighbors. A significant proportion of the readership was adult, particularly low-income women, which distinguished it from the U.S. counterpart.

Most comic books were published in Tagalog and served to promote Filipino, the official language based on Tagalog, throughout the country. Around 1980, during the peak of prostitution tours from Japan to the Philippines, some works featuring Japanese protagonists were illustrated by Filipino artists and published in Japanese.

Traditional comic books experienced a decline in the 1990s and have since evolved into modernized forms with updated content and binding, targeting university students and affluent urban residents. The readership now predominantly consists of males. Following the dissolution of the Roces family's monopoly, numerous independent publishing houses have emerged. Their owners often derive their primary income from mass media or academia and frequently are creators themselves. These publishers maintain close connections with their fan base, nurturing a niche community. General bookstores in the Philippines primarily focus on foreign publications, placing domestic comic books at a disadvantage in terms of sales and distribution. Consequently, independent publishers view comic conventions as vital channels for sales.

Graphic novels, primarily comprising Western works and English-language Japanese ones, are widely accessible in general bookstores. This relatively new publishing format encompasses a diverse range of content, including anthologies, reprints of serialized works, and newly created comics.

Most Pinoy manga, Filipino comics influenced by Japanese manga, are printed in color and cover a wide range of themes, gaining particularly popularity among women aged 8 to 25. Manga publishers focus on middle and high-school students, as publications tailored to this age group were limited in the past.

== Characteristics ==
=== Art styles ===
Traditional Filipino comics draw inspiration not only from U.S. comic book arts but also from pen-drawn magazine illustrations, such as those by Charles Dana Gibson. The iconic character Darna, created by Mars Ravelo, was influenced by the works of Peruvian illustrator Alberto Vargas. According to Gerry Alanguilan, a comic artist known for his efforts in reprinting and popularizing vintage comics, Filipino comic artists were significantly influenced by American illustrators renowned for their exquisite artwork, such as Franklin Booth, J. C. Leyendecker, Norman Rockwell, and Frank Frazetta. Alanguilan characterizes the Philippine art style as "classical and romantic, delineated by luscious and graceful brushwork."

Franscisco Coching was an influential artist who left a lasting impact on his contemporaries starting from the 1950s, earning the nickname "Dean of Filipino Komiks Illustration." Alanguilan praised his "bold and frenetic" brushwork, noting that his figures "seemed to move even when they were standing still."

=== Genres ===
Filipino comics originated in the 1930s with humorous works such as Kenkoy, followed by the popularity of historical heroic tales such as Kulafu. The subsequent rise of melodrama in the 1940s and 1950s, drawing from the tradition of Philippine popular fiction, set the prevailing tone of Philippine comics. Mars Ravelo, one of the genre's most renowned writers, created Roberta, in which a young girl is bullied by her stepmother. By the 1980s, melodramatic narratives infused with themes of sex, violence, and class inequality gained prominence. Despite the male dominance in the industry, this genre was contributed to by many female writers including Elena Patron, who produced over 350 short comics and 120 serials in 20 years, alongside Nerissa Cabral and Gilda Olvidado.

Action and fantasy also have long been popular in Philippine comics. In 1950s, Ravelo introduced Dyesebel, the mermaid who falls in love with a human, and the girl superhero Darna. A common storyline featured the protagonist acquiring a magical item (such as a typewriter, ballpoint pen, or winnowing basket) to overcome adversity. The genre also featured a variety of unusual characters, including half-beast children, talking dolphins, women with a snake or a mouse as twin siblings, three-headed girls, and "The Hands," severed and animated hands with eyes and magical powers. These characters were often drawn inspiration from an eclectic blend of Philippine, Roman, and Greek myths. The genre reached its peak in the 1970s with the works of Pablo Gomez and Carlo Caparas, and by 1980, fantasy narratives were present in around 70% of all comic magazines.

Romance comics had become a dominant genre by the 1990s, comprising more than half of the stories published in popular magazines as indicated by a 1992 survey. Comics editor Emmanuel Martinez suggests that Filipinos are particularly drawn to love stories due to their romantic, emotional, and family-oriented nature. Martinez notes that readers prefer light-hearted tales with optimistic endings. These stories frequently portrayed characters such as a compassionate prostitute, a daughter sacrificing herself for her family, or a woman deceived by her lover, with the protagonist ultimately prevailing and finding happiness. Queer genres, such as boy's love, have recently enjoyed a rise in popularity especially after the rise of queer motion-picture series in the 2020s.

Besides these mainstream genres, Philippine comics explored a wide range of themes, including news, politics, agriculture, biography, history, and sports. Some stories depicted dramas revolving around ordinary people based on reader-submitted narratives. Science fiction elements, such as space adventures, organ transplants, cloning, and test-tube babies, were often featured. Additionally, works imitating hit movies like Jaws, The Towering Inferno, and James Bond, were not uncommon.

=== Sexual and gender representations ===
In the Philippines, where the majority of the population is Catholic, pornography is prohibited by law, and homosexuality tends to be viewed indecent as well. Positive portrayals of homosexuality are rare in mainstream media. According to comics scholar Soledad Reyes, many traditional romance comics depicted protagonists undergoing an overnight transformation from "overaged babies, thumb sucking men and women, [...], and effeminate man" into proud and confident individuals "deeply conscious of their sexuality" through the power of love. Carlo Vergara's Zsazsa Zaturnnah (2003), a gay man who transforms into a female superhero, marked a significant breakthrough in LGBTQIA+ representation in comics. The work garnered attention from both the general public and academia and paved the way for autobiographical comics by LGBTQIA+ artists. Furthermore, a fandom of Japanese-style yaoi exists, which had a small fanbase before 2015, but has drastically grown since the 2020s and transformed into its own sub-genre of Pinoy BL. New generations of queer comic authors, most of which are queer themselves, have focused on creating books to introduce people to the LGBTQIA+ world, covering both differences and similarities to the heterosexual mainstream. Notable works include Ang Jowa Kong Crosswise, Champion of the Rose, Nang Mainlove Ako sa Isang Sakristan, and Sari Sari Story, while various queer comic anthologies have also been published in last few years. In 2017, Saturnino Basilia released a zine anthology titled BOSO: A Peep In Pinoy Bomba Komiks. The zine opens with a provocative question: Why read pornography? Basilia's aim is to reclaim pornography as a space where people’s most repressed emotions and experiences — and their reflections on those experiences — can be explored. Rather than viewing these comics solely as explicit content, he positions them as acts of resistance against censorship. This was later followed by another bomba komiks anthology, SABIK: A Short Time in Pinoy Bomba Komiks.

=== Local themes ===
Filipino language, geography, and culture often merged with American and Japanese influences in various works. While U.S. superheroes typically operate in settings where superhuman abilities arise from innate qualities or are obtained through scientific means and training, the powers of traditional Filipino heroes often stem from faith. Characters like Darna, Panday, and others acquire magical items as symbols of the purity of their hearts. Arnold Arre's 1999 work The Mythology Class extensively explored Filipino mythology, revitalizing the fantasy genre that had been heavily influenced by American superhero comics. By around 2020, commercial works increasingly incorporate noirs and mysteries infused with folklore creatures.

== Adaptations ==
Traditional Philippine comics had maintained a close association with the film industry. Tailored to the preference and aspirations of the "clog-wearing" Filipino public, comic books proved to be suitable source material for films, with approximately 30–40% of major studio releases in 1986 being comic book adaptations. These adaptations covered a variety of genres, including melodramas, romantic comedies, and adventures. Filmmaker Lino Brocka acknowledged his practice of alternating between artistically oriented projects and those based on comics that appeal to existing audiences. Beside direct adaptations, some Filmmakers provided original story for comic magazines, later releasing film adaptations coinciding with the climax of the comic serialization, featuring actors resembling the characters from the comics.

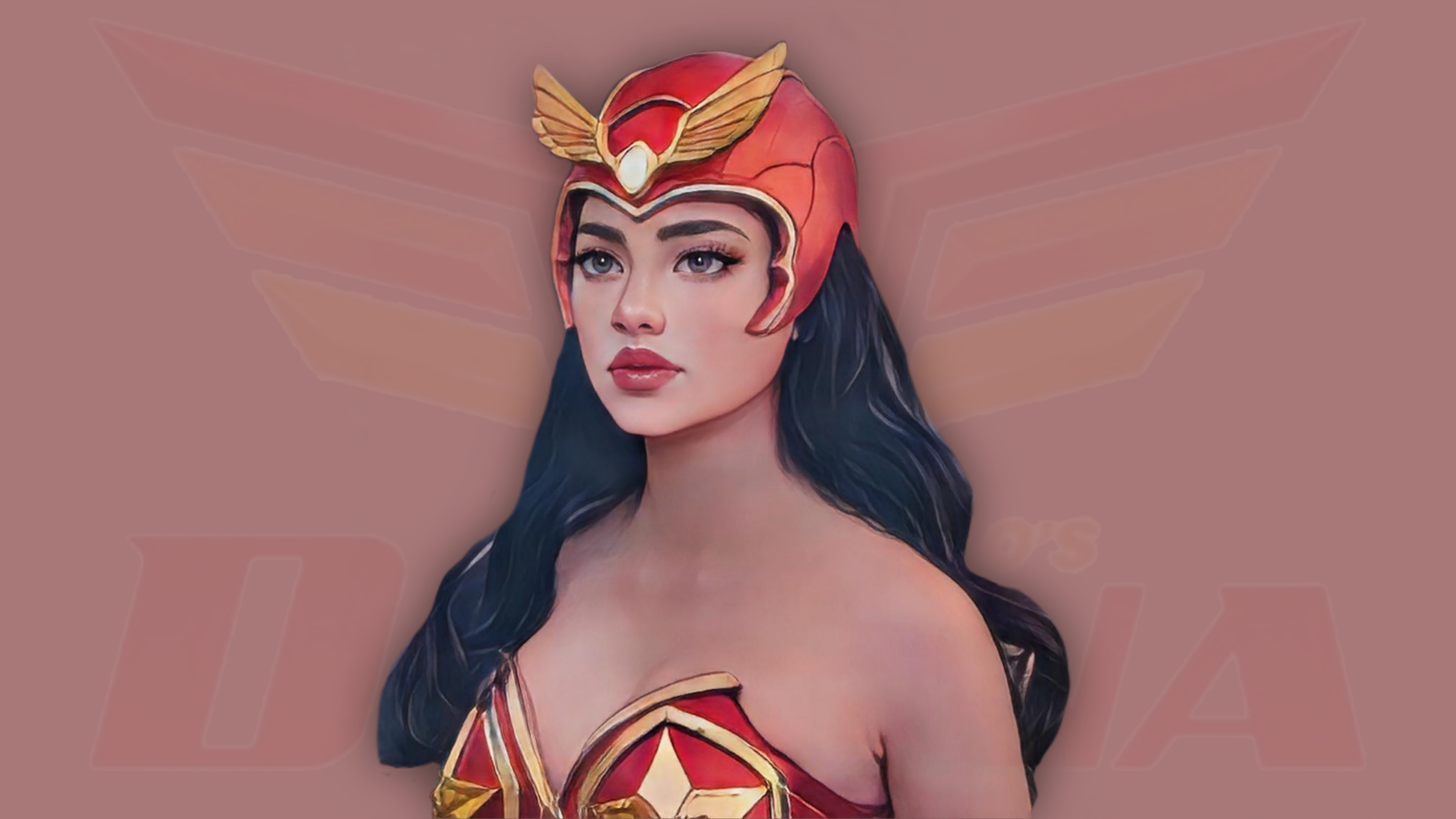
An illustration of the 2022 TV series version of Darna, portrayed by Jane De Leon.

The 21st century continues to witness film adaptations of both older classics and more recent comics. Among classics adapted into television series in the 2000s are Mars Ravelo's Darna (2005), Carlo Caparas' Bakekang (2006), Francisco Coching's Pedro Penduko (2006), Pablo Gomez's Kampanerang Kuba (2005). As of 2016, Darna has been featured 13 films, three TV dramas, an animated TV series, and even ballet performances. Film adaptations of recent comics include Mulawin (2004), Encantadia (2005), and Atlantika (2006).

In 2004, the Philippine Postal Corporation commemorated Philippine comics by issuing a series of stamps. The featured artworks included Darna by Gilbert Monsanto, Darna by Nestor Redondo, Kulafu by Francisco Reyes, and Lapu-Lapu by Francisco Coching.

== National Book Awards ==
The National Book Awards, managed by the Manila Critics Circle (MCC) and the National Book Development Board, have included a category for graphic literature since 1999. Below is a list of awarded artists and works up to 2024, excluding awards given to anthologies.

Awards Year	Category	Title	Author and Illustrator	Description
1999	Comic Book	The Mythology Class	Arre, Arnold	This four-issue series is a landmark in itself: a comic book that combines Filipino myths and legends with modern humor, action, and sensibility. The result is a quirky, enjoyable comic book that is thoroughly modern and Filipino in its approach. Through his distinctive art and story, Arre imbues his young warriors with spunk, spark, and whimsy that resonate with any reader. In The Mythology Class, Arre gives us a glimpse of all that a truly Filipino comic book, drawing on all our multifarious influences, can become, all with a confident and unique style of his own.
2000	Comic Book	Trip to Tagaytay	Arre, Arnold	In this futuristic story, popular actor Aga Muhlach is the aging President, the Eraserheads are on a Reunion Tour that spans the stars, and Philippine Space Lines is offering a 50 percent discount on Moon Travel. A young man journeys through the city, heading for the Grand Liwayway Station where he plans to take the cheapest train out, since they just opened the Tagaytay Ocean Tunnel connecting to Cebu. All the while, he is composing a message addressed to his love who is far away in Orbital Space Station.
2001	Comic Book	Isaw, Atbp.	Michael Vincent Simbulan, Marco Dimaano Marco, Arre Arnold, Carl Vergara	Isaw, Atbp. contains three stories that stand alone, but are also intertwined somehow. The stories are sandwiched by edgy poetry from Dean Francis Alfar, Nikki Alfar, Emrys Capati, Vincent Michael Simbulan, and Tobie Abad.
2002	Comic Book	Ang Kagila-Gilalas na Pakikipagsapalaran ni Zsazsa Zaturnnah	Vergara, Carlo	A mysterious stone falls from the heavens, granting Ada the ability to transform into Zaturnnah, a superhuman warrior endowed with uncanny strength and remarkable beauty. As Zaturnnah, Ada fearlessly defends a small town from rampaging zombies and power-tripping extraterrestrial amazons. Adding color to this simple but riotous tale is the fact that Ada is homosexual and the proprietor of his own quaint beauty salon. With his frilly-mouthed assistant Didi and his objet d’amour Dodong, Ada reinforces his belief in acknowledging the decisions of Destiny, and begins to explore the potential fulness of life.
2003	Comic Book	Mars Ravelo’s Darna	Zach Yonzon, Lan Medina, Gilbert V. Monsanto	Darna was originally created in Tagalog for a weekly magazine in 1951 by prolific comics writer Marcial “Mars” Ravelo, and first drawn by Nestor Redondo. The Filipino superheroine returns to readers in this set of three volumes, in English. The first volume came out in March 2003, the second volume in April 2003, and the third volume in December 2003
2003	Comic Book	Siglo: Freedom	Alfar, Dean Francis Simbulan, Vincent.	“The 10 stories of Siglo strive to capture the zeitgeist of various points of 20th-century Philippine life, beginning in the 1900s and creating snapshots of the decades that lead all beyond the year 2000. We find recurring themes, for freedom transcends time and space, and no matter how things change, human nature remains the same. It is, after all, human nature to long to be free.
2005	Comic Book	Siglo: Passion	Alfar, Dean Francis Simbulan, Vincent	Twelve stories (in comics) presenting different types of passions—from a fey spirit that falls hopelessly in love with a mortal man, to a loving mother’s passion for cooking for her family; from a man whose anger and desperation keep his soul trapped on earth; and into the future where we discover that passion can touch even the existence of an automaton searching for the meaning of her life.
2010	Graphic Literature	Trese: Mass Murders	Tan, Budjette Baldisimo, Kajo	Try to remain calm if you suddenly spot a tikbalang speeding down EDSA or a manananggal swooping across the Makati skyline. While partying at the Fort, never ever let the enkanto at the bar buy you a drink. Yet, there are deadlier things than walk the streets of this city. One of them now demands blood and sacrifice. When crime takes a turn for a weird, the police call Trese.
2012	Graphic Literature in English	Trese 4: Last Seen After Midnight	Tan, Budjette Baldisimo, Kajo	Foul play. Magic spells. Supernatural criminals. When crime takes a turn for the weird, the police call Alexandra Trese. This graphic novel contains the following cases: CADENA DE AMOR In a neglected area of Luneta Park, where the grass grows untended, a man is found strangled by vines; which have started to grow outwards, killing anyone that gets in its path. A PRIVATE COLLECTION A manananggal has been found, tortured and murdered. The Manananggal Clan declares war on the Aswang Clan. Trese must find the real murderer before more blood is shed, before Manila gets in the crossfire of a supernatural gang war. WANTED: BEDSPACER A strange illness has affected the students living along Katipunan Avenue. The doctors are clueless on what's driving these people mad with despair. Can Trese trace the source of this growing paranormal epidemic? FIGHT OF THE YEAR Once a year, in General Santos City, the demons and creatures of the underworld converge to watch a most awaited event, where the country's greatest boxer fights for his very soul.
2013	Graphic Novel in Filipino	Zsazsa Zaturnnah sa Kalakhang Maynila #1	Vergara, Carlo	After defeating a giant frog, a horde of zombies, and the extraterrestrial Amazonista, small-town beautician Ada begins a new chapter by moving the big city with hunky Dodong, and taking up residence in the old house of his friend Gwyneth. Not only does earning his keep prove more difficult, Ada also finds himself dealing with a haunting past, the return of the Zaturnnah stone, new enemies and allies, startling revelations, true confessions, and the prospect of a new--and complicated--romance. Can Ada survive a place that seeks to wear out his mind, his body... and his heart? Zsazsa Zaturnsah sa Kalakhang Maynila is the sequel to the award-winning graphic novel. This is the first of the three parts.
2013	Graphic Novel in English	Trese 5: Midnight Tribunal	Tan, Budjette Baldisimo, Kajo	In a city where the aswang control everything that is illegal and where ancient gods seek to control everything else, enforcing the law can be a very difficult task. When crime takes a turn for the weird, the police normally call Alexandra Trese. Lately, it seems like others have been taking that call. Trese must confront these supernatural crime-fighters and bring order back to the city, before the underworld attempts to seek balance in its own way.
2014	Graphic Literature in Filipino	PilandoKomiks Isyu 2: Mga Pagsubok ng Karagatan	Sinaban, Borg	Nagsimula ang Pilandokomiks sa kagustuhang palawakin ang mundo ni Pilandok, maipakita ang mga hiwaga at kababalaghan sa ating kapaligiran, at makapamahagi ng magandang istorya sa kabataan. Ang komiks na ito’y para sa mga nakabasa ng mga aklat pambata na isinulat ni Virgilio Almario at iginuhit ni Kora Dandan-Albano, at puwedeng-puwede rin sa mga hindi pa nakakabasa ng mga aklat ni Pilandok.
2014	Graphic Literature in English	The Dark Colony Book I: Mikey Recto & The Secret of the Demon Dungeon	Budjette Tan, Bow Guerrero, J.B. Tapia	Mikey had other plans on his Holy Week holiday. Driving for his grandfather was not part of it. Nor did it involve running into a very unholy secret.
2015	Graphic Literature in Filipino	Tabi Po (Volume 1)	Malonzo, Mervin	Isang lalake ang bigla na lamang nagising sa loob ng isang puno sa gitna ng kagubatan na walang alaala kung sino siya at saan siya nagmula. Ang tanging alaala lang niya ay isang imahe ng babae na nakikita niya sa kanyang panaginip, at ang tanging nararamdaman niya ay isang matinding gutom na mabilis na namumuo sa kanyang walang pusod na sikmura. Isang gutom na mapapawi lamang ng laman...at dugo.
2015	Graphic Literature in English	Rodski Patotski: Ang Dalagang Baby	Alanguilan, Gerry Arre, Arnold	Rodski Patotski, Ang Dalagang Baby, written by Gerry Alanguilan and illustrated by Arnold Arre, is a fun Pinoy Komiks tribute that blends adventure, fantasy, sci-fi and family drama rolled into one. Rodski, a born genius, grows up to be the most intelligent girl in the whole country, but her heart and mind remains that of a 5 year old.
2015	Wordless Graphic Literature	14'	Abrera, Manix	4 Silent Comics is Manuel “Manix” Abrera’s one-person exhibition that presents his silent comics (comics without dialogue). Characters from Philippine mythology like the manananggal, white lady, duwende and kapre will be portrayed in a different light through stories that cast them as protagonists. They are either funny or philosophical, caught up in circumstances where they meet different creatures, mortal and otherwise.
2016	Graphic Literature in English	Kare Kare Komiks	Drilon, Andrew	Satisfy your hunger! Zipping along the borders of every genre, a metafictional hunter faces an apocalyptic entity threatening the very fabric of stories! In order to defeat it, he must dive into this collection of more than twenty delicious comics stories and enlist the aid of its colorful characters!
2016	Wordless Graphic Literature	Light	Cham, Rob	This wordless comic book follows the exploits of a backpack-toting adventurer in a quest to find a mysterious treasure. Framed in black, the illustrations offer delightful bursts of color and are sure to entertain readers of any age.
2016	Graphic Literature in Filipino	News Hardcore! Hukbong Sandatahan ng Kahaggardan	Abrera, Manix	Ipinapakita ng News Hardcore ang "behind-the-scenes" na mundo ng media ~ may naghahari, may inaapi, may peke at may marangal, may malungkot, at higit sa lahat, may nakakatawa.
2018	Graphic Literature	Dead Balagtas, Tomo 1: Mga Sayaw ng Dagat at Lupa	Kampilan, Emiliana	Dead Balagtas is the first and most creative comics about the long and colorful history of the Philippines. In this first volume, a wise babaylan tells the story of the birth of the universe from the passionate love between Tungkung Langit and Laon Sina. Witness the rise of the continents, the clash of oceans, and the romance of sea and earth—forces that shaped and continues to mold our home and nation, the Philippines.
2019	Graphic Literature	Kikomachine Komix Blg. 14: Alaala ng Kinabukasan	Abrera, Manix	In Alaala ng Kinabukasan, Manix Abrera's latest collection of Kikomachine strips, deeper existential issues are tackeld with irreverent wit and wry humor. It is an admirable work that demonstrates as a comic artist (in the truest sense of the word) coming into his own. –Emil Francis M. Flores
2022	Graphic Literature	Tarantadong Kalbo 1	Raymundo, Kevin Eric	In a year of excellent comics work, Tarantadong Kalbo came away with the National Book Award because of its tremendous impact. The book’s craft is undeniable, with its cartooning and visual language, as well as its insightful observations and sharp sense of humor. But what makes this collection’s win undeniable is the social impact that these works have had, and will continue to have. If one were to try and understand the last two apocalyptic years and the lives we have lived through it, this collection would serve as a chronicle and companion, something in dialogue with the times as well as a book that we will continue to resonate in the future. - Carl Joe Javier
2023	Graphic Novel in English	Alandal	Ignacio, Jay Niño, Alex	Ang Alandal ay isang maaksiyong epiko ng digmaan, pag-ibig, at pagtataksil na madetalyeng isinulat ni Jay Ignacio at mas madetalye pang isinalarawan naman ni Alex Niño na isang batikang dibuhista. Malalim ang pananaliksik ni Jay sa kuwentong ito na bunga ng kaniyang pagkahumaling sa Filipino martial arts. Ang mga larawan naman ni Mang Alex ay may kakaibang enerhiya na nag-iimbita sa mga mata ng mambabasa na suriin at kilatisin ang bawat detalye. Lahat ng pigura ay gumagalaw na parang nakuhanan ng larawan sa gitna ng pagsasayaw. Isang pagdiriwang ang pagbabalik ni Mang Alex sa Pinoy komiks at salamat kay Jay sa pagbibigay-daan dito. - Mervin Malonzo
2023	Graphic Novel in Filipino	Ang Mga Alitaptap ng Pulang Buhangin	Quilantang, RH	Isang mundong nababalot ng kadiliman ang makikita natin sa Ang mga Alitaptap ng Pulang Buhangi ni RH Quilantang. Ngunit sa kabila ng kalunos-lunos na kalagayang ito, may iilang mga matatapang na taong nagsisilbing liwanag at gabay para sa mga natitirang mga tao. Sila ang mga tanod na nagpapanatili ng kaayusan at tagapagligtas ng mga tao laban sa mga halimaw ng dilim. Mahusay na napaghalo ni RH ang mitolohiya at teknolohiya sa kuwentong ito. Pagsasama ng luma at bago. Pinapatunayan ng kuwentong ito na kayang labanan ng maliliit naliwanag ng mga alitaptap ang kadiliman kung magsasama-sama at magkakaisa ang mga ito. - Mervin Malonzo
2024	Graphic Novel and Comics in English	Death be Damned	Alcazaren, Mike; Pascual, Noel; and Bernardo, AJ; Bernardo, AJ; and Nicolas, Joel	Death be Damned by Mike Alcazaren, Noel Pascual, and AJ Bernardo is the English edition of Patay Kung Patay, originally an eight-part comic in Filipino, chronicling one bloody night of vengeance when a horde of undead is sent into the estate of one of the most powerful, and corrupt, families in the Philippines. What ensues is a pageant of blood and the absurd as a cast of all-too-real characters struggle to achieve their goals amidst the carnage. Lives are lost and secrets laid bare, but no matter how many times humans seek to bury the truth, the land always remembers.
2024	Graphic Novel and Comics in Filipino	Josefina	Molina, Russell L. Enriquez, Ace C.	Josefina by Russel L. Molina and Ace C. Enriquez is a black and white, one-shot, horror comic featuring the Philippine folklore creature known as a manananggal—but don’t be deceived, as the source of the horror lies in the human characters rather than the supernatural. Set during the Japanese occupation of the Philippines during World War II, it involves the entanglement of Josefina, the titular manananggal, with Philippine guerrillas attempting to fight back against the Japanese invaders. Molina and Enriquez make full use of art, words, and contrast to tell a story of treachery, monstrosity, and humanity that displays the strengths of comics as a medium.
2024	Graphic Novel and Comics in English	Sa Wala	Renren Galeno	Zombie-chicken horror sounds like a perfect pitch for a comic book. Beyond that though, Nothing to Lose is such a layered story, speaking of family, aspirations, struggles, oppression, hope, desperation. All of this told with an expert-level of comics craft.
2024	Graphic Novel and Comics in Filipino	Sining Killing	Randy Valiente	When Sining Killing opens we think we are going to read a coming-of-age story. It expands from that point to become an exploration of and confrontation with our history. The pyrotechnics come from the creator’s ambitious willingness to delve into the complex, nuanced, and painful parts of our the characters’ histories, which are inextricable from martial law and its aftermath. Valiente’s work could easily be considered a masterpiece.

== See also ==
- List of Filipino komik artists
- List of Filipino comics creators
- List of Filipino komiks
- List of Filipino superheroes
