= Illustrated By =

Illustrated By: Filipino Invasion of U.S. Comics is a 2012 documentary film about Filipino artists who worked in the mainstream US comic book industry since the 1970s. It features interviews with key industry professionals, including comics artists, pencilers, and illustrators who were published by big companies like Marvel Comics and DC Comics. It premiered at the 1st Sineng Pambansa National Film Competition of the Film Development Council of the Philippines and screened at the Comic-Con International Independent Film Festival in 2014.

== Background ==
The film was written and directed by Levi "Pepper" Marcelo, who began working on a short film featuring an interview with komiks artist Gerry Alanguilan and Leinil Francis Yu. It was then selected by the Film Development Council of the Philippines (FDCP) to be part of its first Sineng Pambansa competition.

=== Crowdfunding ===
In May 2012, Marcelo launched a campaign to help fund the production besides the initial grant received from FDCP. Through Artiste Connect, a Manila-based crowdfunding website, the campaign raised ₱101,500 for four months.

== Plot ==
The full-length film traces the history of Filipinos in the American comics industry, featuring such figures as artists Tony DeZuniga (who drew for DC Comics), Abe Ocampo, Jun Lofamia, Alfredo Alcala, Gerry Alanguilan, Leinil Francis Yu, Harvey Tolibao, Carlo Pagulayan, Wilson Tortosa, Gilbert Monsanto, Boboy Yonzon, writer Budjette Tan, komiks collector Dennis Villegas and Marvel Comics editor-in-chief C. B. Cebulski. It tells the story of their contributions to mainstream comics.

== Release ==
Illustrated By was a finalist for the documentary section of the 1st Sineng Pambansa National Film Competition hosted by the Film Development Council of the Philippines (FDCP). It debuted on June 28, 2012, in Davao City. After the film's release in 2009, it was screened in other film festivals and several comic conventions. It had its international premiere at the Comic-Con International Independent Film Festival in 2014.
