= Komikon =

Comic convention

Komikon (with komik as the Tagalized form for comic, and convention) is an annual comic book fan convention in the Philippines founded by Artist's Den to be the first convention solely dedicated for comic book enthusiasts. The first convention was held at the U.P. Bahay ng Alumni, UP Diliman, Quezon City, on October 22, 2005. Since then, Filipino fans have gathered annually to meet with the country's local talents and exchange common interest in the comic book genre.

The artists who have graced the convention are Gerry Alanguilan, Leinil Yu, Carlo Pagulayan, Edgar Tadeo, Pol Medina, Jr., Carlo Vergara, Carlo J. Caparas amongst other.

Komikon provides avenue for independent publishers to showcase their books in the market, and get feedback from readers and fans. It also provides opportunities for aspiring artists through its various art contests as well as enable them to network with already published creators. In the early years, there were also portfolio reviews conducted by David Campiti and other members of Glasshouse Graphics.

The event also exhibits some artworks of known Filipino comic book illustrators such as Nick Manabat, Alfredo Alcala, Alex Niño, Nestor Redondo, and Tony DeZuniga.

== Gallery ==
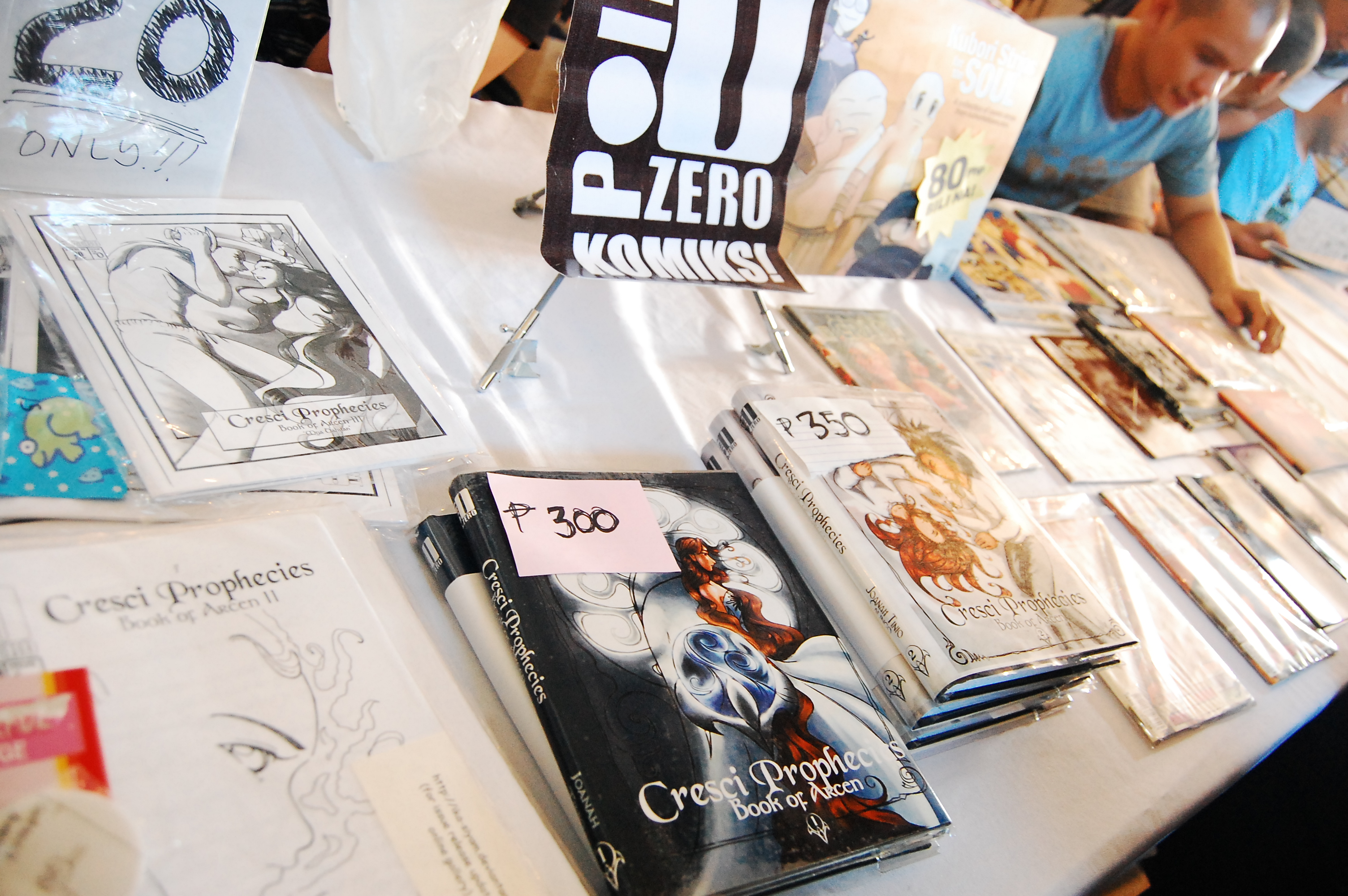
Local comics on display
