= Silent Dragon =

Cover of the first issue

Silent Dragon is a creator-owned Wildstorm comic book limited series written by Andy Diggle with pencils by Leinil Francis Yu and inks by Gerry Alanguilan.

== Plot ==
Tokyo, A.D. 2063: the Yakuza warlord Hideaki has seized total control of Honshū's underworld while ruthlessly crushing all opposition. But his true dream is the overthrow of the government itself. Japan's hard-line military junta will do anything to stop him and they have found the ultimate pawn to set their plan in motion: Renjiro, the chief advisor to the notorious gangster. Caught between a lifetime of honor and loyalty to his Yakuza clan and the iron-fisted might of the military elite, Renjiro will find that the only way to stop a civil war and avoid total annihilation is to play both sides against the middle.

== Publication ==
Released as a 6 issue mini-series in 2005 and collected as a trade paperback:

- Silent Dragon (with Andy Diggle, Leinil Francis Yu and Gerry Alanguilan, DC, 6 issue mini-series, 2005, tpb, 144 pages, 2006 ISBN 1-4012-1104-6)
