= Elmer (comics) =

Filipino comic book by Gerry Alanguilan

- Cover to the North American edition of Elmer, published by Slave Labor Graphics. Art by Gerry Alanguilan
- Date: 2006–2008
- No. of issues: 4
- Main characters: Jake Gallo
- Page count: 144 pages
- Publisher: Komikero Publishing; Slave Labor Graphics

Creative team
- Writers: Gerry Alanguilan
- Artists: Gerry Alanguilan
- Creators: Gerry Alanguilan

Original publication
- Language: English
- ISBN: 978-1-59362-204-6

Elmer is a Filipino comic book created, written, and illustrated by Gerry Alanguilan. It was originally self-published as a four-issue miniseries under a Komikero Publishing imprint between 2006 and 2008 before being collected in a trade paperback in 2009. In 2010, it was published in France by Editions Ca Et La and North America by Slave Labor Graphics.

Elmer is set in a world where chickens suddenly gain human-level intelligence and the ability to speak. It focuses on one particular chicken, Jake Gallo, who is part of the second generation of intelligent chickens. When his father dies, Jake inherits a diary chronicling a struggle for equal rights that spans twenty years. It was favorably compared to George Orwell's Animal Farm and received critical acclaim for its art and seriousness. It won two awards in France and was nominated for one in North America.

== Publication history ==
=== Production ===
Alanguilan grew up in San Pablo, Laguna, a city in a fairly rural area of the Philippines where chickens roam freely through the streets. By the mid-1990s, he was established in the American comic industry as an inker for popular artists such as Whilce Portacio and Leinil Yu and his work had been published by DC Comics, Marvel Comics, and Image Comics. He had been fascinated by chickens his whole life and had been making comic strips about them since 1997. He distributed these strips as photocopied minicomics under the title Crest Hut Butt Shop. One of the features was "Stupid Chicken Stories".

In 2005, he set out to do a sequel, Ultimate Chicken Story, which he intended to be "the most hysterically ridiculous story about chickens ever written." He spent more than a year researching chickens before he began writing, and the idea became more serious as he explored it, developing into "an opportunity to tell a story that isn't really about chickens, but of humanity in general, and how we treat each other."

The first draft was very different from what was eventually published because he removed parts he felt were too sensational or dramatized. In the first draft, the story was told entirely from the point of view of Elmer, an intelligent chicken who is also an actor. Influenced by David Beauchard’s Epileptic and David Mazzucchelli’s City of Glass, Alanguilan altered the story's structure to focus on Elmer's son, Jake. Alanguilan also drew on an event from his teenage years, when he found his father's diary and read about the death of Gerry's uncle Dennis. The new format turned the story into one about Alanguilan, his parents, and his "fears of losing them as they get older." The original opening scene was a human attacking a chicken before being revealed as a film production. Alanguilan believed the scene was too much of a gimmick and moved it to the middle of the book.

Although a comic book about sentient chickens could have been fantasy or science fiction, he decided to make it an outright drama. The storyline eventually became too serious for a title as silly as Ultimate Chicken Story, so he changed it to Elmer. The story was fully planned when he began work on the first issue, and he wrote it in English because he wanted an international audience.

He began drawing the comic book in early 2005 with traditional art tools such as Mongol pencils and brushes. He took great care while illustrating Elmer because he felt his earlier work, Wasted, was poorly drawn. To devote time to completing the comic book, he had to quit his job working for US comic companies. As a result, the period between 2006 and 2008 was one of the most financially difficult times of his life.

=== Publication ===
Alanguilan did not expect Elmer to be as successful as it later became, but he knew it was good enough to pay for professional printing. He self-published it in the Philippines between 2006 and 2008 as a four-issue miniseries under the name "Komikero Publishing." The second and third issues had twice as many pages as a standard comic book. In 2006, he sent copies of the first issue to online columnists, reviewers, retailers, and industry insiders to let people know it existed. This self-promotion led the book to get good reviews from well-known writers like Steven Grant and Neil Gaiman and a widely read interview with Tom Spurgeon on "The Comics Reporter." The Spurgeon interview led the entertainment megastore Forbidden Planet to order copies directly from Alanguilan and promote it with special offers.

After the series was complete, Alanguilan offered all four issues in a special box set release, followed by a Filipino edition trade paperback in 2009. When the first edition of the Filipino collection was about to sell out in 2011, National Book Store offered to finance and print a second edition for Alanguilan. He was allowed to keep ownership of the material and the book included the "Komikero Publishing" label. The second edition had a different cover, additional material, and was only available in the Philippines.

International publishers expressed some interest in carrying Elmer, but none of them would commit to it. To generate more interest among readers, Alanguilan released the sold-out first issue for free online. This led publisher Editions Ca Et La to purchase the French rights in 2010. After Alanguilan exchanged emails with publisher Dan Vado, Slave Labor Graphics released Elmer as a 144-page trade paperback in North America. Slave Labor Graphics also distributes the comic digitally.

== Plot ==
In 1979, an unexplained phenomenon causes the sky to flash white. Afterward, every chicken around the world develops instantaneous intelligence on par with humans. They are also able to speak clearly.

In 2003, second-generation intelligent chicken Jake Gallo is struggling to fit into a society he does not believe respects him. When his father, Elmer, falls ill, Jake returns to his childhood home in the remote countryside (hinted though never explicitly stated to be in Alanguilan's native Philippines). He reunites with his mother Helen, his brother Frankie, his sister May, and his parents’ human neighbor and friend, Ben. Elmer, who is in a coma, does not wake up and Jake does not get to say goodbye. Per Elmer's request, Helen gives his diary to Jake.

Jake glances through it and realizes it is a record of events after chickens gained human intelligence, beginning with Elmer's memories of the first day. He reads a random section in which Elmer and his brother Joseph were attacked by Ben. Jake confronts Ben and accuses him of only pretending to be his parents’ friend. Ben becomes angry and tells Jake that it was a different time, and that he would not understand. Ben reveals that there were a few chickens who became intelligent prior to 1979, and that he met one at the poultry where he worked. Ben recognized that the chicken was aware, but he beat it to death with a brick out of fear. This filled him with guilt, so when all chickens gained awareness he protected the three he could – Elmer, Helen, and Joseph. Ben suggests Jake read the whole diary from beginning and offers to add context if he can.

Elmer recounts the initial violent backlash by humanity and how Ben hid the three of them from groups out to kill chickens. This is followed by retaliation against humans by chickens, chicken-rights groups, and eventually recognition of chickens as humans by the United Nations. During this time, Elmer becomes a syndicated columnist in a newspaper and writes about chicken-related topics, both light-hearted and serious. The peace between humans and chickens is disrupted in the late 1980s by an outbreak of bird flu. Millions of healthy chickens are killed by humans to prevent the spread of the disease, and Ben hides Elmer and Helen again. When others come for them, Ben intervenes and is accidentally shot protecting Elmer. Once the flu is contained, humanity expresses regret for its rash actions and Elmer writes a scathing editorial about the panic. His journal entries become less frequent after he and Helen have children.

While he reads the diary over the course of several months, Jake is confronted by his siblings about his own view of humans. He spends time with his sister's human fiancée and visits the set of a film in which his brother stars. Jake is introduced to a human actress whom he finds attractive. As he reaches the end of his father's diary, there is an entry detailing a time Jake was attacked by some human boys as a child. Jake, who had repressed the memory, discusses it with his mother. He learns the attack was stopped by members of "Gallus Rex", an anti-human chicken group. Their actions colored Jake’s perception, and Elmer recorded his concerns about their effect on Jake in his diary.

Jake turns his father's diary into a successful book and begins dating the actress he met on the movie set.

== Critical reception ==
The art in Elmer was praised for its seriousness.

Elmer received mostly positive reviews from critics, winning the French ACBD Prix Asie (Asia Prize for Criticism) Award and the Prix Quai des Bulles Award in 2011 and being nominated for the 2011 Best New Graphic Album Eisner Award. The major United Kingdom retailer Forbidden Planet offered the book at a discount because they felt it was something that should be read, promoting it to customers by comparing it to George Orwell's Animal Farm and saying Alanguilan uses "the child fable-like idea ... to comment on morality, family and prejudice." The comparison to Animal Farm was reiterated by SLG Publisher Dan Vado and critic Carl Doherty. In an interview with PhilStar Global, famed writer Neil Gaiman described the work as "heartbreaking and funny", adding that it is "beautifully drawn." Veteran comic writer Steven Grant called it "work of a mature talent".

The art was praised by critics for supporting the seriousness of the text. Publishers Weekly said the art "takes what should be a self-evidently ludicrous proposition and somehow imbues it with plausibility". Jeff VanderMeer agreed, describing the art as detailed but never cluttered, adding realism to the plot. Reviewer Christopher Allen said Alanguilan's "inking gifts [are] on display with lots of rural texture." Greg McElhatton said Elmer "takes its subject quite seriously, avoiding chicken puns, jokes, and other sorts of trickery," but expressed disappointment that Jake was not as compelling of a character as Elmer.
