= Ultimate Wolverine vs. Hulk =

Comic book series

- Cover of Ultimate Wolverine vs. Hulk #1, by Leinil Yu.

Publication information
- Publisher: Marvel Comics
- Schedule: erratic
- Format: Limited series
- Genre: Superhero fiction
- Publication date: December 2005 to May 2009
- No. of issues: 6
- Main character(s): Wolverine; The Hulk

Creative team
- Written by: Damon Lindelof
- Artist: Leinil Francis Yu
- Colorist: Dave McCaig

Ultimate Wolverine vs. Hulk is a comic book miniseries, published by Marvel Comics. The series is set in one of Marvel's shared universes, the Ultimate Universe. It was written by Lost co-creator Damon Lindelof, and illustrated by artist Leinil Francis Yu and colorist Dave McCaig. The title characters square off after Wolverine is contracted by Nick Fury to assassinate the Hulk, who is known to be residing in Tibet. The series features cameos by other Ultimate characters, as well as the introduction of Ultimate She-Hulk.

It was originally planned as a six-issue, bimonthly series. But after two issues, the remainder of the series was postponed until Lindelof finished all of the scripts, and the series began publication again with a new issue in March 2009.

The series takes place between Ultimate X-Men issues 69 and 71 and before Ultimates #11. The miniseries is a throwback to Wolverine's comic debut in The Incredible Hulk #180-182.

== Plot summary ==
=== Issue One ===
Wolverine awakens to find his lower half missing, his body having been ripped in half by the Hulk minutes earlier. Using his keen sense of smell, he finds his legs have been thrown to the top of a mountain. As he climbs up a mountain to retrieve his legs, he recalls the events leading up to his current situation.

He recounts meeting Nick Fury, Betty Ross and Jennifer Walters, and being told that the Hulk is alive and responsible for several "incidents" of mass destruction after a public "execution" by S.H.I.E.L.D. Fury gives Logan (Wolverine) the assignment to hunt down and "take care" of the Hulk. Wolverine tracks the Hulk to a small Tibetan village, where the Hulk is found lounging, surrounded by scantily clad women.

=== Issue Two ===
The events leading up to the fight between Hulk and Wolverine are shown from Bruce Banner's perspective. The comic begins with Banner being left for dead on an off-shore ship, tied down to the deck with a bomb sitting beside him. He turns into the Hulk at the last minute, and the explosion fails to kill him. The Hulk swims to Omaha Beach, Normandy, France, transforming back into Banner as he reaches the shore.

Banner finds himself drifting from one location to the next, forced to relocate every time he loses control of his temper and becomes the Hulk. The first time, a Parisian psychologist accuses Banner of not letting himself get angry over losing Betty, calling him impotent and driving him over the edge. The second time he is working as a farm hand and his boss mocks him for eating tofurkey, a tofu turkey substitute. The third time, Banner musters the courage to call Betty once more, only to have a man answer the phone. He ventures to Tibet in search of the Panchen Lama, a monk along the same line of holiness as the Dalai Lama, to find an answer to his problem. The Panchen Lama turns out to be a child. Upon hearing about Banner's troubles, he asks 'What if it is not you that changes into the Hulk, but the Hulk that changes into you?'.

=== Issue Three ===
The issue opens with multiple flashbacks and flashforwards to various points during the series, then it shows the confrontation between Hulk and Wolverine. Hulk and Wolverine have a conversation where Hulk states that he was cured of his anger, but a parting comment Wolverine makes about Betty Ross enrages Hulk and causes him to tear Wolverine in half. At the top of the mountain, Hulk is waiting and ready to eat one of Wolverine's legs, but before that happens a new arrival is airdropped onto the mountaintop, Ultimate She-Hulk. When asked who she is, her response is simply, "I'm plan B."

=== Issue Four ===
Save for the last two pages, the issue consists of advancing flashbacks from the perspective of Betty Ross, including Banner's attempted phone call and Wolverine's meeting with Fury, jumping to three days prior when Betty unsuccessfully attempts to convince Tony Stark and Steve Rogers to save Banner from Logan. Two days prior, Dr. Walters has succeeded in producing a version of the Hulk serum which transforms the subject without inducing Hulk-like rage, with Betty the next day attempting to convince Fury that Walters is seeking to sell the super-soldier serum to the Chinese. As Betty takes a S.H.I.E.L.D. jet to Tibet, Fury discovers that the Hulk serum has been stolen and angrily orders Betty taken down, but not before she injects herself with the serum and undergoes the transformation into She-Hulk. After landing and announcing "I'm Plan B", Betty reveals her identity much to the horror of Wolverine. This causes an enraged and crying Hulk to state, "Betty break Hulk's heart... now Hulk break Betty!"

=== Issue Five ===
The issue begins with Logan, in a dream state, encountering a panda who claims that he is Logan's spirit animal. As the pair come to blows, the Panda says the fight between Banner and Logan is personal. He also does not want Logan to tell the Hulk's last words to the people who cut off his head. Logan wakes up to find he's reduced to just a head on a tray. Fury angrily attempts to question him on what happened. Logan initially claims he blacked out after the Hulk tore him in half, instead of admitting he was awake for Banner and Betty's sexual encounter. He then accidentally reveals that he was awake when S.H.I.E.L.D. tried to drop a nuclear bomb on the Hulk. Fury, in an act of rage, shoots Logan in the head.

When Logan wakes up again, this time fully restored, he escapes with the aid of Forge. Instead of thanking Forge for the rescue, Logan demands the mutant make restraint collars to subdue the Hulks. He then lets slip that the Hulk is going to meet Logan again in Casablanca, unaware that Fury is listening in.

=== Issue Six ===
Wolverine goes to Casablanca with a collar that Forge created and confronts Betty, who had just taken a shower. He tells her to put it on but she refuses, turns into She-Hulk, and the two fight. She gouges out one of his eyes, but he stabs her in the spleen and kidney, and forces her to tell him where Banner is. She agrees, and then turns back into Betty, and Logan leaves her.

Logan then gets on a plane Banner is taking, and puts the collar on Banner, telling him that if he turns into Hulk, it will choke him to death. Banner asks why Logan simply won't just kill him, and Logan says that he doesn't want to kill Banner, he wants to kill the Hulk. Banner says that he won't change, and then jumps out of the airplane emergency exit in mid-flight. Logan jumps out after him screaming at him to turn into the Hulk or the fall will kill him. Banner says that he will only change if Logan cuts off the collar, or else Logan will have to deal with the fact that he simply let "Bruce" and not the "Hulk" fall to his death. Logan, not wanting to be responsible for Banner's death, breaks the collar. Banner changes to Hulk, saving himself and Logan. They both land safely in the middle of a desert.

Nick Fury shows up and Hulk, confused and angry, grabs him and threatens to kill him. Fury reveals that they now have She-Hulk in their possession, and are trying to reverse-engineer what she did to herself. As long as they have her, he knows that Banner will not do anything against S.H.I.E.L.D.'s interests. Hulk lets Fury go and talks calmly with Logan about how they are going to get back to civilization. Logan asks if Hulk can pick him up and jump to the nearest town, and Hulk agrees.

== Delays in the series ==
The release schedule of the series met with many delays, starting with Issue 3. It was originally solicited for April 19, 2006, only to be resolicited for May 17. That date came and went, and after about a week with no word on the issue's fate, Marvel announced that it would be released July 12. Further delays caused the issue to be bumped to August 9, then September 20, then October 25, then November 1, November 8, and December 27. Finally it was announced in mid-November 2006 that the third issue of the series had been officially canceled until all of the remaining issues of the mini series are completed.

At a panel at San Diego Comic-Con in 2008, Quesada and Lindelof announced that all of the remaining issues had been scripted, with Lindelof handing Quesada the final script in front of the audience, and that once Yu had finished his work on Secret Invasion, he would provide artwork for the remaining issues.

In Joe Quesada's weekly blog, he showed a bit of a script from an upcoming issue in the series. In the preview, there is a scene where Ultimate Hulk is making Wolverine choose which leg he would rather Hulk ate. Quesada also wrote in his blog that Leinil Francis Yu was excited to get started on the series again, after Secret Invasion. The first two issues were rereleased in February 2009 in preparation of the release of the concluding issues. The third issue was finally released on March 4, 2009, with the fourth and fifth issues getting their release in April, and the sixth and final issue released in May 2009, three and a half years after the release of the first.

== Motion comic ==
On September 10, 2013, the series was adapted into a Marvel Knights animated motion comic and released on DVD by Shout! Factory.
