= Jonas Diego =

Filipino comic book writer and artist

- Areas: Comic book writer, artist, graphic designer

Jonas Diego is a Filipino comic book writer and artist. He has works published, mainly with independent studios and publishing houses, in the U.S. and the UK in both traditional (print) and non-traditional channels (web-based and mobile content).

His recent works include a 12-page contribution for the comic book anthology Siglo: Passion written by Luis Katigbak and colored by Joel Chua for Kestrel Publishing and Quest Ventures, which won the National Book Award in the Philippines 2006 and Tales from the Enchanted Kingdom published by Enchanted Kingdom and Mango Comics.

Jonas also produces comic books for various companies and advertising agencies such as Architel, a Dallas, Texas based IT company, and ACE Saatchi and Saatchi (Philippines), as well as develops and produces content for mobile phones.

Aside from his pursuits in the field of comic books, graphic design, and mobile content, He is also a problogger handling writing chores for The Comic Blurb, a comics-themed blog that is a member of the first Filipino blogging network, Bayanihan Blogs.
