= Wasted (comics) =

- Original cover of Wasted published in 1998 by Alamat Comics

Publication information
- Publisher: Alamat Comics
- Publication date: July 1994 through July 1996
- Main character(s): Eric

Creative team
- Created by: Gerry Alanguilan

Wasted is a comic book series written and drawn by Gerry Alanguilan and published by Alamat Comics since July 1994 through July 1996. It was first released as an eight-issue photocopied comics and later collected into one volume by Alamat Comics in 1998, releasing a total of 500 copies. The entire story was serialized in several parts on the pages of PULP Magazine in the Philippines beginning in 2000, and eventually compiled the story once again as Wasted: The Final Edition in 2003, releasing 2000 copies. In 2013, a new edition of the story was published independently by Gerry Alanguilan himself. The entire series is currently available to read online for free.

Comic book writer Warren Ellis considered Wasted "an early work by a potentially brilliant creator".

Wasted tells the story of Eric, a musician who loses his dad and his girlfriend, and goes on a rampage in the city looking for twisted justice and ultimately, death. Wasted was Gerry Alanguilan's first self-written comic, and was originally intended for only Alanguilan's close friends to read, as he was embarrassed by the large amount of violence and profanity in the title.

== Wasted: Confession ==
Wasted: Confession is a tie-in story written and drawn by Gerry Alanguilan that was first released in 2009. The story is set in between issues 3 and 4 of the main comic, showing Eric react to an 'innocent' bystander horrified by his recent rampage. The comic was later included as an extra in the 2013 compilation of the comic.
