= High Roads (comics) =

- Cover to High Roads #1, written by Scott Lobdell and penciled by Leinil Francis Yu

Publication information
- Publisher: Cliffhanger
- Format: Limited series
- Publication date: April 2002
- No. of issues: 6
- Main character(s): Nick Highroad

Creative team
- Written by: Scott Lobdell
- Artist(s): Leinil Francis Yu
- Colorist(s): Edgar Tadeo

High Roads is a six-issue limited series created by writer Scott Lobdell and artist Leinil Francis Yu. It was published in April 2002 by Cliffhanger, an imprint of DC Comics' WildStorm.

== Plot ==
U.S. Army Captain Nick Highroad fights for survival in the final days of World War II, meeting a British actor, an ex-kamikaze pilot, and one of Hitler's mistresses along the way. The groups comes up with a plan to steal one of Hitler's most prized possessions.

== See also ==
- Cliffhanger
- List of Wildstorm titles
