= Leinil Francis Yu =

Filipino comic book artist (born 1977)

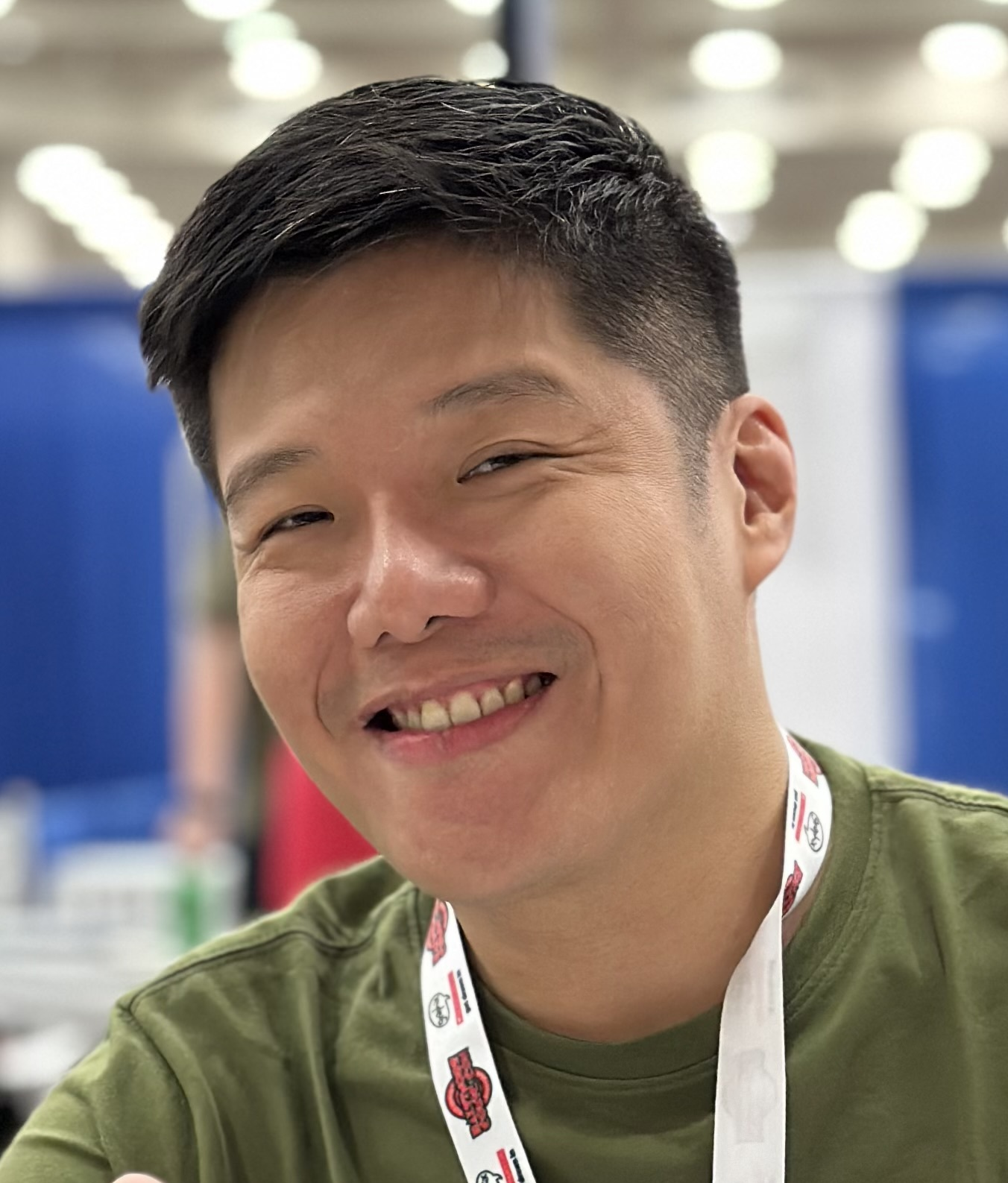
- Yu in 2024
- Born: 1977
- Areas: Penciller, Inker
- Notable works: Superior; New Avengers; Silent Dragon; Superman: Birthright; X-Men, vol. 2

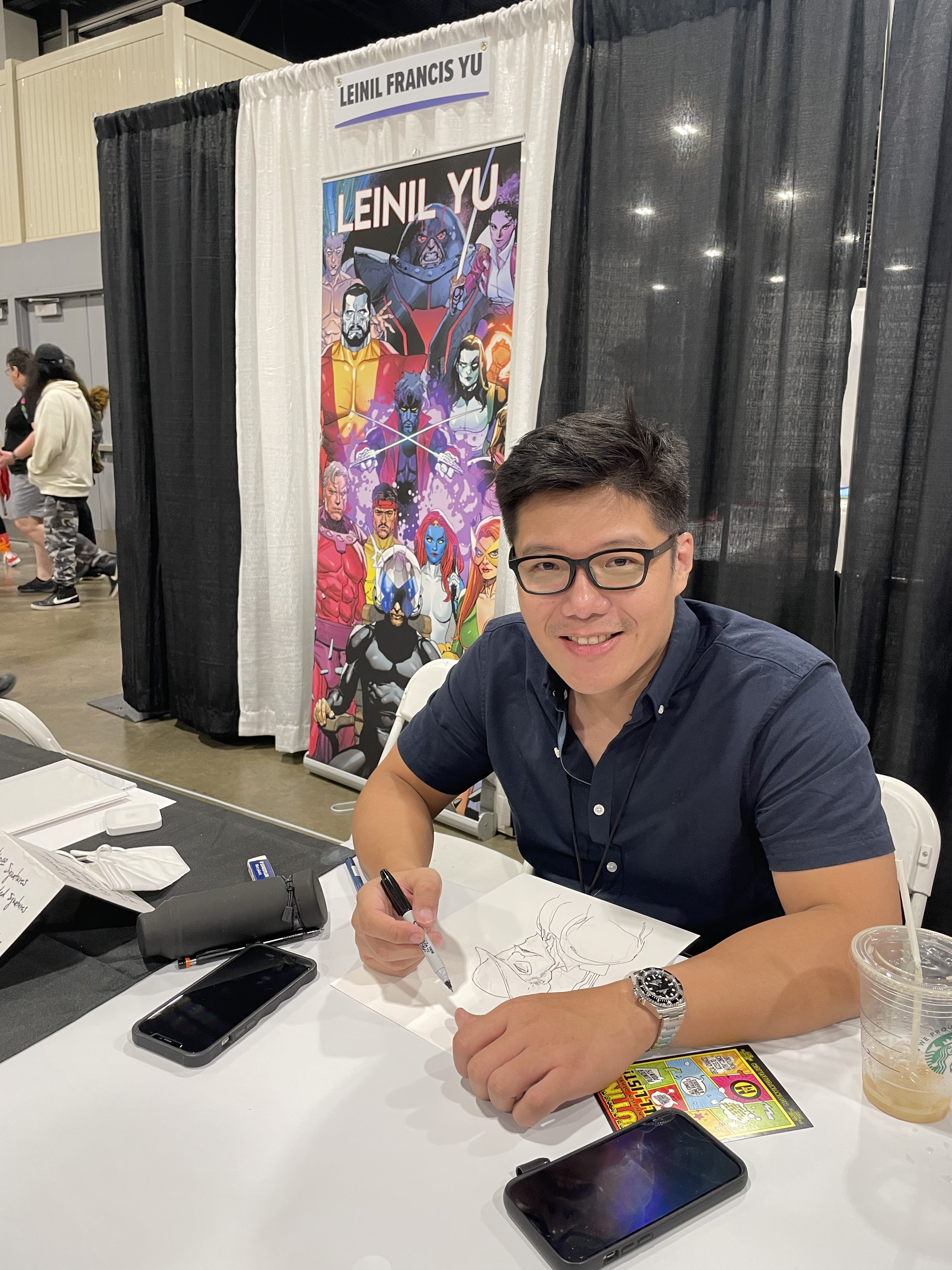
At a con in 2022

Leinil Francis Yu (born 1977) is a Filipino comic book artist, who began working for the American market through Wildstorm Productions.

== Career ==
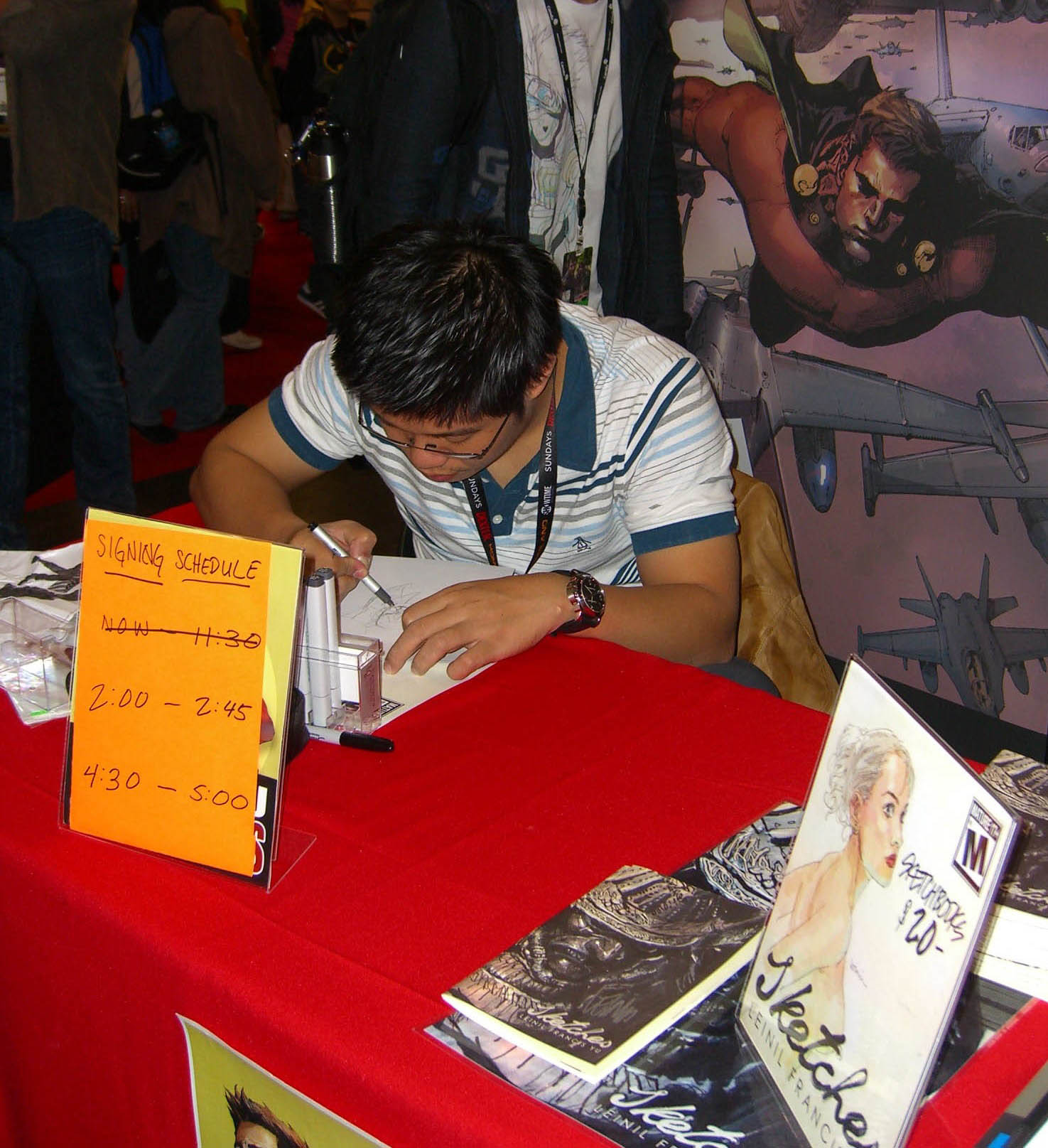
Yu sketching at the New York Comic Con in Manhattan, October 16, 2011

Leinil Francis Yu was first recognized after winning the Wizard's Drawing Board Contest, his first published work. He was first hired by Whilce Portacio to do some work for Wildstorm and started his comic book artist's career on Aster: The Last Celestial Knight #3 (with Ronaldo Roxas) in the mid-1990s, but that work fell through. Portacio then passed on samples of Yu's work to Marvel Comics, who subsequently hired him to work on Wolverine.

After his run on Wolverine he moved on to work on Marvel's core X-Men title in 2000, which was being written by Chris Claremont at the time. Yu continued to work on other Marvel titles such as Fantastic Four, Ultimate Wolverine vs. Hulk and New Avengers. He also co-created High Roads with writer Scott Lobdell at Cliffhanger, and Superman: Birthright with Mark Waid and Silent Dragon with Andy Diggle at DC Comics.

His run on Marvel's New Avengers series ended with #37 so he could begin working on Secret Invasion, which was written by Brian Michael Bendis. He also completed his work on the long-delayed Ultimate Wolverine vs. Hulk series after finishing the miniseries Secret Invasion, before going on to work on Ultimate Comics: Avengers 2 with writer Mark Millar.

Yu was commissioned to design the cover for The Pin-Up Girls' 2001 debut album Hello Pain, and the internationally released Taste Test EP.

Yu was a conceptual artist on the 2005 feature film Serenity.

On April 9, 2011, Yu was one of 62 comics creators who appeared at the IGN stage at the Kapow! convention in London to set two Guinness World Records, the Fastest Production of a Comic Book, and Most Contributors to a Comic Book. With Guinness officials on hand to monitor their progress, writer Mark Millar began work at 9am scripting a 20-page black and white Superior comic book, with Yu providing the book's front cover, and the other artists appearing on stage throughout the day to work on the pencils, inks, and lettering, including Dave Gibbons, Frank Quitely, John Romita Jr., Jock, Doug Braithwaite, Ian Churchill, Duncan Fegredo, Simon Furman, David Lafuente, John McCrea, Sean Phillips and Liam Sharp, who all drew a panel each. The book was completed in 11 hours, 19 minutes, and 38 seconds, and was published through Icon on November 23, 2011, with all royalties being donated to Yorkhill Children's Foundation.

Yu formed the band Marty McFly along with college friends and has produced a self made album.

He drew Avengers #30, a "jam issue", featuring splash pages by various artists including Walt Simonson and Jim Cheung.

In 2018 Marvel relaunched a new volume of Captain America, with Yu as artist.

In 2019, Yu created the first Filipino superhero "Wave" who first appears in the Marvel Comics issue War of the Realms: New Agents of Atlas #1, published on May 8, 2019. There are also two variant covers that came from a comic shop in the Philippines that feature Wave on the cover, making it her first cover appearance.

== Bibliography ==
=== Interior work ===
==== DC ====
- Batman/Danger Girl: "Dangerous Connections" (with Andy Hartnell, one-shot, 2005)
- High Roads, miniseries, (with Scott Lobdell, 2002)
- Superman: Birthright, limited series, (with Mark Waid, 2003–04)
- Silent Dragon, miniseries, (with Andy Diggle, Wildstorm, 2005–06)

==== Marvel ====
- Avengers, vol. 5, 18–23, 29–34 (2013)
- Avengers vs. X-Men: AvX #5 (Hawkeye vs. The Angel) (with Matt Fraction, 2012)
- Avenging Spider-Man #5 (with Zeb Wells, 2012)
- AXIS #3–4, 8 (2014)
- Captain America #1–6 (with Ta-Nehisi Coates, 2018)
- Civil War (Secret Wars) #1–5 (2015)
- Civil War: Choosing Sides: "Switching Sides" (with Marc Guggenheim, one-shot, 2006)
- Fallen Son: The Death of Captain America #1: "Denial" (with Jeph Loeb, 2007)
- Fantastic Four, vol. 1, #600: "The Arc" (with Jonathan Hickman, 2011)
- Fantastic Four, vol. 3, (The Thing) Annual 2001
- Indestructible Hulk #1–5 (2012–13)
- New Avengers Finale (with Brian Michael Bendis, among other artists, one-shot, 2010)
- New Avengers #22, 27–37 (full art); 50 (among other artists) (with Brian Bendis, 2006–09)
- New Avengers Finale (among other artists) (2010)
- Hulk #23: "Who Is the Red Hulk?" (with Jeph Loeb, among other artists, 2010)
- Secret Invasion, miniseries, #1–8 (with Brian Bendis, 2008–09)
- Secret Empire, miniseries, #1–10 (with Nick Spencer, among other artists, 2017)
- Star Wars, vol. 2, #16–19 (2016)
- Supercrooks #1–4 (with Mark Millar, Icon, 2012)
- Superior #1–7 (with Mark Millar, Icon, 2010–12)
- Ultimate Avengers vs. New Ultimates #1–6 (2011)
- Ultimate Wolverine vs. Hulk, miniseries, (with Damon Lindelof, 2006–09)
- Ultimate X4 (Fantastic Four/X-Men) #2 (with Mike Carey and Pasqual Ferry, 2006)
- New X-Men Annual '01: "The Man from Room X" (with Grant Morrison, 2001)
- Ultimate Comics: Avengers (2010–11):
  - Ultimate Comics: Avengers 2 #1–6 (with Mark Millar, 2010)
  - Ultimate Comics: Avengers vs. New Ultimates #1–6 (with Mark Millar, 2011)
- Ultimate X-Men Annual #2: "Why Xavier's Cat is Named Mystique" (with Robert Kirkman, 2006)
- Uncanny X-Men #364, 366–367 (with Steven T. Seagle, Alan Davis and Fabian Nicieza, 1999)
- Wolverine (1997–1999):
  - "The Wind from the East" (with Larry Hama, in #113, 1997)
  - "For the Snark Was a Boojum, You See!" (with Larry Hama, in #114, 1997)
  - "A Whiff of Sartre's Madeleine!" (with Larry Hama and Cary Nord, in #-1, 1997)
  - "Operation: Zero Tolerance" (with Larry Hama, in #115–118, 1997)
  - "Not Dead Yet" (with Warren Ellis, in #119–122, 1997–1998)
  - "Logan's Run!" (with Chris Claremont, in #125, 1998)
  - "Blood Wedding" (with Chris Claremont, in #126, 1998)
  - "Survival of the Fittest" (with Todd Dezago, in #129–130, 1998)
  - "A Rage in the Cage" (with Fabian Nicieza, in #132, 1998)
  - "The Freaks Come Out at Night" (with Erik Larsen, in #139, 1999)
  - "Vengeance" (with Erik Larsen, in #140, 1999)
  - "Broken Dreams" (with Erik Larsen and Eric Stephenson, in #141, 1999)
  - "Reunion" (with Erik Larsen and Eric Stephenson, in #142–143, 1999)
  - "On the Edge of Darkness" (with Erik Larsen, in #145, 1999)
- X-Men #1–4, 7, 9–12, 14 (with Jonathan Hickman, 2019–2020)
- X-Men, vol. 2 (then X-Men: Legacy) #100–102, 104–108, 110–113, Annual 2001 (with Chris Claremont and Scott Lobdell, 2000–2001)

==== Other publishers ====
- Aster: The Last Celestial Knight #3 (with Ronaldo Roxas, Entity, 1996)
- Buffy the Vampire Slayer: Tales of the Slayers: "First Slayer" (with Joss Whedon, graphic novel, Dark Horse, 2001)
- High Roads (with Scott Lobdell, Cliffhanger, 2002)
- Unbound Saga: "Rick Ajax vs. Doctor Pig-Sticker" (with Mike Kennedy, Dark Horse, 2009)

=== Books and compilations ===
- Silent Dragon, TPB, 144 pages, 2006 ISBN 1-4012-1104-6)

=== Cover work ===
- Wolverine #1/2, 128 (Marvel, 1997–1998)
- Bishop: The Last X-Man #2 (Marvel, 1999)
- X-Men v2 #97, 109 (Marvel, 1999–2001)
- X-51, The Machine Man #8 (Marvel, 2000)
- Magneto: Dark Seduction #2 (Marvel, 2000)
- Star Wars Tales #10, 15 (Dark Horse, 2001–2002)
- KISS #3 (Dark Horse, 2002)
- Reveal #1 (Dark Horse, 2002)
- Hellboy: Weird Tales #4 (Dark Horse, 2003)
- Breakdown #1 (Devil's Due, 2004)
- Defex #1 (Devil's Due, 2004)
- Conan #9–14 (Dark Horse, 2004–2005)
- Serenity: Those Left Behind #3 (Dark Horse, 2005)
- New X-Men #20 (Marvel, 2006)
- Fantastic Four Special #1 (Marvel, 2006)
- Punisher vs. Bullseye #3 (Marvel Knights, 2006)
- Black Panther #15 (Marvel Knights, 2006)
- X-Men Unlimited #14 (Marvel, 2006)
- Uncanny X-Men Annual #1 (Marvel, 2006)
- Marvel 1602: Fantastick Four #1 (Marvel, 2006)
- Wonderlost #1 (Image, 2007)
- Thunderbolts #110 (Marvel, 2007)
- The Amazing Spider-Man #539, 604, 634 (Marvel, 2007–2010)
- Mighty Avengers #1 (Marvel, 2007)
- The Dark Tower: The Gunslinger Born #3 (Marvel, 2007)
- Hedge Knight II: Sworn Sword #1 (Marvel, 2007)
- Sub-Mariner #3 (Marvel, 2007)
- The Last Defenders #3 (Marvel, 2008)
- War of Kings #1 (Marvel, 2009)
- Agents of Atlas #6–9 (Marvel, 2009)
- Dark Wolverine #75–77 (Marvel, 2009)
- Ultimate Comics: Avengers #1 (Marvel, 2009)
- Captain America: Reborn #3 (Marvel, 2009)
- Vengeance of the Moon Knight #1–6 (Marvel, 2009–2010)
- What If? Secret Invasion #1 (Marvel, 2010)
- Millar & McNiven's Nemesis #1, 4 (Icon, 2010–2011)
- New Ultimates #1 (Marvel, 2010)
- Wolverine: Origins #46 (Marvel, 2010)
- Marvel Zombies 5 #3 (Marvel, 2010)
- Sentry: Fallen Sun #1 (Marvel, 2010)
- I am an Avenger #1 (Marvel, 2010)
- Ultimate Comics: Mystery #1 (Marvel, 2010)
- X-Men #238–243, 245–246 (Marvel, 2010–2011)
- Ultimate Comics: Avengers 3 #1 (Marvel, 2010)
- What If? Wolverine: Father #1 (Marvel, 2011)
- X-23 #4 (Marvel, 2011)
- Kick-Ass 2 #2 (Marvel, 2011)
- New Mutants #23 (Marvel, 2011)
- Spider-Island: Avengers #1 (Marvel, 2011)
- X-Men v3 #19 (Marvel, 2011)
- Avengers: X-Sanction #1 (Marvel, 2012)
- All-New X-Men #12 (variant only, Marvel, 2013)
- Death of Wolverine #1 (variant only, Marvel, 2014)
- MPH #2 (Image, 2014)
- The Amazing Spider-Man #792 (variant only, Marvel, 2017)
- All-New Wolverine #24 (Marvel, 2017)
- Astonishing X-Men #9 (Marvel, 2017)
- Secret Empire #4 (variant only, Marvel, 2017)
- Phoenix Resurrection: The Return Of Jean Grey #3, 5 (Marvel, 2017)
- Kingsman: The Red Diamond #5 (Marvel, 2018)
- The Amazing Spider-Man #17 (variant only, Marvel, 2018)
- Weapon H #1–6 (Marvel, 2018)
- Return of Wolverine #1– (variant only, Marvel, 2018)
- Uncanny X-Men #1– (Marvel, 2018)
- Batman #70 (variant only, DC, 2019)
- Savage Avengers #1 (variant only, Marvel, 2019)
