= List of Filipino comics creators =

This is a list of Filipino comics creators or komikeros. Although comics (Filipino: Komiks) have different formats, this list covers creators of editorial cartoons, comic books, graphic novels and comic strips, along with early innovators. The list presents authors with the Philippines as their country of origin, although they may have published or now be resident in other countries. For other countries, see List of comic creators.

== A ==
- Richie Acosta (Marvel)
- Lib Abrena (Ipo-ipo)
- Manix Abrera (Kikomachine Komix)
- Dani Aguila (Barrio Breeze, The Cock and Bull)
- Gerry Alanguilan (Wasted, Elmer)
- Alfredo Alcala (Voltar)
- Larry Alcala - (Kalagog en Bosyo)
- Fred Alcantara
- Mar Amongo
- Jay Anacleto
- Rene Aranda (Prof, Sports Manny)
- Arnold Arre (After Eden, The Mythology Class, Trip to Tagaytay)

== B ==
- Kajo Baldisimo (Trese)
- Charlie Baldorado
- Delfin "Dell" Barras
- John Becaro (Creator of Pintura)
- Richard Benito (Creator of Maya Man)
- Edgar Bercasio
- Manuel Buising
- Danny Bulanadi

== C ==
- Cris CaGuintuan
- Jose C. Caluag
- Deniz Camp
- Carlo J. Caparas
- Fred Carrillo
- Jojie M. Casiao
- Nar Castro
- Joey Celerio
- Vincente "Vicatan" Doria Catan Jr.
- Ernie Chan
- Elizabeth Chionglo (Love Knots)
- Aria "Arya" Chelabian (Ma-I)
- Rene b. Clemente
- Francisco Coching (Marabini, Hagibis, El Indio)
- Gregorio C. Coching
- Karl Comendador
- William Contreras (Tok & Mol)
- Pia Maria Coll (Tuldok)
- Arnel R. Coronel
- Eufronio "E. R." Reyes Cruz

== D ==
- Junius "Jun" R. De Leon
- Ronnie del Carmen
- Mike del Mundo
- Oscar del Rosario (Ipo-ipo)
- Floro Dery
- Tony DeZuniga (Jonah Hex, Black Orchid)
- Jonas Diego
- Dominique Duran (Doorkeeper, Champion of the Rose)

== E ==
- Jim E. Espallardo
- Rod Espinosa

== F ==
- Ruben M. Fabian
- Jim Fernandez (Anak ni Zuma)
- Don Figueroa
- Rudy Florese

== G ==
- Steve Gan
- Diogenes A. Gelito Jr.
- Buddy Gernale
- Bong Gimena
- Pablo S. Gomez
- Adrian "Ading" Gonzales
- Paquito E. Gonzales
- Lyndon Gregorio (Beerkada Comics)

== H ==
- Teny Henson

== I ==
- Ramil Ibay
- Nestor Infante
- Jo Ingente Jr.

== J ==
- Richard G. Jacinto (Scriptwriter/Contributor to GASI from 1982 to 1996)
- Federico C. Javinal
- Jay Jimenez
- Jim Jimenez
- Jess Jodloman

== K ==
- Emiliana Kampilan
- Rafael Kayanan
- Vincent Kua Jr.

== L ==
- Abel Laxamana
- Joe Mari Lee
- Carlos V. Lemos
- Nestor Leonidez
- Jun Lofamia
- Bert Lopez
- Nes Lucero
- Jonathan Luna
- Joshua Luna

== M ==
- Toto Madayag
- Nestor Malgapo
- Nick Manabat
- Francis Manapul
- Ben Maniclang
- Fred D. Marchadesch
- Nonoy Marcelo
- Petronilo Z. Marcelo
- Menny Eusobio Martin
- Rodel Martin
- Roy Allan Martinez
- Lan Medina
- Pol Medina, Jr. (Pugad Baboy)
- Rudy Mesina
- Gilbert Monsanto
- Yong Montaño

== N ==
- Chuck Nanco
- Rudy Nebres
- Alex Niño
- Delando Niño

== O ==
- Abe Ocampo
- Gilda Olvidado
- Jeffrey Marcelino Ong
- Jerome Opeña
- Joey Otacan

== P ==
- Carlo Pagulayan
- Noly Panaligan
- Hermoso D. Pancho
- Elena Patron
- Whilce Portacio

== R ==
- Mars Ravelo (Darna, Dyesebel, Captain Barbell, Lastikman, Bondying, Varga, Maruja, Flash Bomba, Tiny Tony, Dragonna, Trudis Liit)
- Kevin Eric Raymundo (Tarantadong Kalbo)
- Francisco "Frank" Redondo
- Nestor Redondo (Rima, Darna)
- Virgilio Redondo
- Francisco Reyes (Kulafu, Talahib, Kilabot, Buhawi, Mahiwagang Sinulid)
- Pedrito Reyes
- Rico Rival
- Albert Rodriguez (Crazy Jhenny)
- Emilio Rodriguez
- Dionisio J. Roque

== S ==
- Gil Sabas
- Mar Santana
- Hal Santiago
- Larry R. Santiago
- Roni Santiago (Baltic & Co., Kuyug, Mr. & Mrs.)
- Jesse Santos
- Mauro Malang Santos - (Kosmé the Cop, Retired)
- Bert R. Sarile
- Cal Sobrepeña
- Ian Sta. Maria (Skyworld, Salamangka)

== T ==
- Edgar Tadeo
- Gerry Talaoc
- Budjette Tan (Trese)
- Philip Tan
- Romeo Tanghal
- Nestor Tantiado
- Dannie Taverna
- Harvey Tolibao
- Elpidio Torres
- Wilson Tortosa
- Francisco "Corky" Flores Trinidad, Jr. (Nguyen Charlie)
- Celso L. "Sonny" Trinidad
- Noel Tuazon

== V ==
- Romeo Valdez
- Randy Valiente
- Ohrlee Vee
- Tony Velasquez (Kenkoy)
- Carlo Vergara
- Richie Villamiel
- Andrew Philip Villar (Agents Of Ambush/Ambush comics)
- Faye Villanueva (Incognito Serye/Maharlikan Chronicles/Zona Cero)

== Y ==
- Ruben Yandoc
- Tonton Young - (Pupung)
- Leinil Francis Yu (Wave)

== Z ==
- José Zabala-Santos
- Noly Zamora
- John Carlo Velasco (Ang Kuwento ng Kahariang Etniko)

== See also ==
- List of Filipino komik artists
- List of Filipino komiks
- List of Filipino superheroes
