= List of Philippine comics =

This is a list of Philippine comics (Filipino: komiks).

== 0-9 ==
- 12 Kuba by Nemesio E. Caravana (author) and Ruben N. Yandoc (artist)
- 13 Little Fingers
- 13 Sugat ng Puso
- 24 Na Oras na Sindak
- 29 (Veinte Nueve)
- 3 Pilya
- 3 Sisters by Mars Ravelo (author) and P.Z. Marcelo (artist)
- 666 by Hal Santiago
- 9-Year Old Mother by Elena M. Patron/Greg Igna de Dios (authors) and Angel B. Magpali (artist)
- …At Nilikha ng Diyos ang Babae by D.G. Salonga (author) and Mar T. Santana (artist)

== A ==
- Abante Action
- Abante Komedi
- Abaruray…Abarinding
- Abel at Eden by Carlo J. Caparas (author) and Rico Rival (artist)
- Abilitat sa Akong by J.M. Perez
- Abrakadabra
- Aceron by Virgilio Redondo (author) and Rudy Florese (artist)
- Ad Infinitum
- Ada by Pablo S. Gomez (author) and Louie D. Celerio (artist)
- Ada: Ang Nuno sa Punso by Pablo S. Gomez (author) and Rico Rival (artist)
- Adonis Abril
- Adonis, Obra Maestra ng Baliw
- Adora by Tarhata Memije Directo (author) and Mar Amongo (artist)
- Adriana
- After Eden by Arnold Arre
- Agatona by Carlo J. Caparas (author) and Mar T. Santana (artist)
- Agilang Itim
- Agimat ng Pusang Itim
- Agua Bendita by Rod A. Santiago
- Aguila Qualikomiks
- Aguinaldong Banal
- Ahastra by Cil Evangelista (author) and Ruben Javier (artist)
- Akda Komiks
- Akin ang Huling Halakhak by Nerissa G. Cabral (author) and Joey D. Celerio (artist)
- Akin ang Kasalanan
- Akin Ka
- Akin Ka…Ngayong Gabi! by Rico Bello Omagap (author) and Rudy V. Arubang (artist)
- Aklat ng Kabayanihan: Graf Spee
- Aklat ng Kabayanihan: Pearl Harbor by Alfredo P. Alcala
- Aklat ng Kabayanihan: Prince of Wales by Alfredo P. Alcala
- Aklat ng Kabayanihan: Warspite by Alfredo P. Alcala
- Aklat ng Kabayanihan: Yamato
- Ako ang Uusig
- Ako ba ay Tao?
- Ako Pa Rin Ang Hari by Steve Gan
- Ako…Ang Iyong Panginoon
- Ako…Si Jesse! by O.B. Pangilinan (author) and Mar T. Santana (artist)
- Ako'ng Panginoon by O.B. Pangilinan (author) and Tony Caravana (artist)
- Ako'y Ifugao…Pilipino by Carlo J. Caparas (author) and Rudy V. Villanueva (artist)
- Ako'y Nauuhaw! by Mars Ravelo (author) and Elpidio E. Torres (artist)
- Ako'y Tao –May Dugo at Laman! by Mars Ravelo (author) and Mar T. Santana (artist)
- Aksiyon Komiks by Eriberto Tablan (author) and Alfredo Alcala and Virgilio Redondo (artists)
- Alabok sa Ulap
- Alakdang Bato
- Alamat 101
- Alamat Comics
- Alamid by Tony Caravana
- Ala-Suwerte
- Album ng Kabalbalan ni Kenkoy by Romualdo Ramos (author) Tony Velasquez (artist)
- Aldong Kuba by Joven N. Gapuz
- Alex Bato by Pete San Felipe/Floren Perello (authors) and Edgar Bercasio (artist)
- Ali Badbad en da Madyik Banig by R.R. Marcelino (author) and Cal Sobrepena (artist)
- Ali Mudin by Clodualdo del Mundo (author) and F. Macabuhay (artist)
- Alicia Alonzo by Mars Ravelo (author) and Elpidio E. Torres (artist)
- Aling Kutsero by Virgilio Redondo (author) and Nestor Redondo (artist)
- Aling Maria by Elena M. Patron (author) and Freddie Tolentino (artist)
- Alinlangan
- Alipin ng Busabos by Mars Ravelo (author) and P.Z. Marcelo (artist)
- Aliwan Komiks
- Almira
- Alona by Emil Quizon Cruz
- Always in my Heart
- Alpha Omega Girl by Flor Afable Olazo (author) and Nar O. Castro (artist)
- Alyas Agimat by Clodualdo del Mundo (author) and Jesse F. Santos (artist)
- Alyas Baldo by Elena M. Patron (author) and Vir G. Flores (artist)
- Alyas Buldoser
- Alyas James Bond-Ying
- Alyas Palos by Virgilio Redondo (author) and Nestor Redondo (artist)
- Alyas Raquel Roma
- Alyas Raton Ariel
- Alyas Tigre
- Amalia Darling! by Jim Fernandez
- Amalia ng Quiapo by Tony Caravana
- Amanda
- Amor Encantado
- Ampaw
- Anak Mo…Ama'y Ako! by Greg Igna de Dios (author) and Mar T. Santana (artist)
- Anak ng Aking Asawa
- Anak ng Bakulaw by Virgo Villa (author) and Federico Perona (artist)
- Anak ng Bulkan
- Anak ng Demonyo by Pablo S. Gomez (author) and Louie D. Celerio (artist)
- Anak ng Gangster by Ramon R. Marcelino (author) and Mar T. Santana (artist)
- Anak ng Hudas
- Anak ng Impakta
- Anak ng Kidlat by Virgilio Redondo (author) and Nestor Redondo (artist)
- Anak ng Lawin by Pablo S. Gomez (author) and Rico Rival (artist)
- Anak ng Tampalasan
- Anak ni Abraham by Benjie Valerio, Jr. (author) and Fabie Infante (artist)
- Anak ni Dyesebel by Mars Ravelo (author) and Elpidio E. Torres (artist)
- Anak ni Prinsipe Amante
- Anak ni Zuma by Jim Fernandez (author) and Ben S. Maniclang (artist)
- Anatalia by Rico Bello Omagap (author) and Antonio J. Ocampo (artist)
- Ang 12 Pag-ibig ni Rizal
- Ang Akin ay Akin at ang Iyo ay Akin pa Rin by Pablo S. Gomez (author) and Dannie Taverna (artist)
- Ang Akin ay Para sa Lahat by Pablo S. Gomez (author) and Alex Nino (artist)
- Ang Anak Ko'y Amerikana
- Ang Anino sa Luksang Salamin
- Ang Asong Itim sa Gulod
- Ang Babaing Hinugot sa Aking Tadyang
- Ang Babaing Nakapula by Elena M. Patron (author) and Louie D. Celerio (artist)
- Ang Babaing Pusa
- Ang Babaing Walang Kaluluwa
- Ang Baliw sa Libingang Luma by Pablo S. Gomez (author) and Lan Medina (artist)
- Ang Bangkay ni Senyor Hugo by Larry Tuazon (author) and Rod A. Santiago (artist)
- Ang Barbaro by Francisco V. Coching
- Ang Bilanggo sa Pulong Kristo
- Ang Biyenan Kong Amerikana by Mars Ravelo (author) and P.Z. Marcelo (artist)
- Ang Buhay na Bato sa Latian
- Ang Buhay nga Naman by Lib Abrena
- Ang Buhay ni Huwang Pahanga
- Ang Bukas ay Akin! (Langit ang Uusig) by Nerissa G. Cabral (author) and Joe Mari Mongcal (artist)
- Ang Bukas ay Walang Hanggan
- Ang Daigdig ng Ada by Pablo S. Gomez (author) and Louie D. Celerio (artist)
- Ang Daigdig ni Doktor Markus by Virgilio Redondo (author) and Alfredo P. Alcala (artist)
- Ang Daya-Daya by Mars Ravelo (author) and Elpidio E. Torres (artist)
- Ang Espadang Umaawit
- Ang Ganda-Ganda Ko by Elena M. Patron (author) and Rudy Florese (artist)
- Ang Gangster at ang Birhen by Ramon R. Marcelino (author) and Mar T. Santana (artist)
- Ang Gina at si Aladino by Jess A. Noriega
- Ang Halimaw sa Intramuros
- Ang Hiwaga ng Rosas na Itim
- Ang Huling Lalaki ng Baluarte by Carlo J. Caparas (author) and Nestor Malgapo/Karl Comendador (artists)
- Ang Huling Romansa by Elena M. Patron (author) and Romy T. Gamboa (artist)
- Ang Ikatlong Nilalang ng Diyos
- Ang Inyong Lagalag na Reporter by O.B. Pangilinan (author) and Nes Ureta (artist)
- Ang Kagila-gilalas na Pakikipagsapalaran ni Zsazsa Zaturnnah by Carlo Vergara
- Ang Kalabog by Larry Alcala
- Ang Kaluluwa ni Dante by Francisco V. Coching
- Ang Kambal sa Uma by Jim Fernandez (author) and Ernie H. Santiago (artist)
- Ang Kampana sa Santa Quiteria by Pablo S. Gomez (author) and Tony Caravana and Hal Santiago (artists)
- Ang Kampanerang Kuba by Pablo S. Gomez (author) and Alex Nino (artist)
- Ang Kasaysayan ng Eden
- Ang Kasaysayan ni Josue
- Ang Kasaysayan ni Judith
- Ang Kasaysayan ni Ruth
- Ang Kasaysayan ni Samuel
- Ang Kastilyo sa Sapang Itim
- Ang Kuba sa Palengke by Pablo S. Gomez (author) and Butch (artist)
- Ang Langaw
- Ang Lihim ni Gagamba by Virgilio Redondo (author) and Nestor Redondo (artist)
- Ang Limbas at ang Lawin by Francisco V. Coching (author) and Federico Javinal (artist)
- Ang Mababangis
- Ang Maskara ni Palos by Virgilio Redondo (author) and Nestor Redondo (artist)
- Ang Maton
- Ang Mga Kasalanan ni Emmaruth by Ading Gonzales
- Ang Mga Lawin by Virgilio Redondo (author) and Nestor Redondo (artist)
- Ang Mga Pakikipagsapalaran ni Rondo
- Ang Multo ni Carlota
- Ang Multo sa Bahay-Pari
- Ang Mundo ni Andong Agimat by Arnold Arre
- Ang Nakangiting Bangkay
- Ang Nobya Kong Igorota by Rico Bello Omagap (author) and Jim Fernandez (artist)
- Ang Paa ni Isabella
- Ang Pagano by Francisco V. Coching (author) and Federico Javinal (artist)
- Ang Pagbabalik ng Vampira
- Ang Pagbabalik ni Darmo Adarna by R.R. Marcelino (author) and Rey Arcilla (artist)
- Ang Paghihiganti ni Astrobal by Jim Fernandez (author) and H.A.N.D. (artist)
- Ang Palasyo ng Mandaragat
- Ang Pamana
- Ang Panday by Carlo J. Caparas (author) and Steve Gan (artist)
- Ang Pinasulabi
- Ang Prinsesa at ang Alipin
- Ang Sandok ni Boninay by Rod A. Santiago (author) and Joe Mari Mongcal (artist)
- Ang Sawa sa Lumang Simboryo by Amado C. Yasona (author) and Tony de Zuniga/Hugo Yonzon (artists)
- Ang Signo by Virgilio Redondo
- Ang Tagisan ng mga Agimat
- Ang Taong Halimaw sa mga Guho ng Intramuros
- Ang Tatlong Kaluluwa ni Eba by Rey Leoncito (author) and Rey Macutay (artist)
- Ang Testamento ni Don Gallardo
- Ang Tigre at ang Diablo
- Ang Tunay na Dugo't Laman
- Ang Ulilang Anghel
- Ang Utak
- Angela
- Angela Markado by Carlo J. Caparas (author) and Abe Ocampo (artist)
- Angelito
- Angelo
- Anghel ng Demonyo
- Anghel sa Impiyerno by Conrado G. Diaz (author) and Bert Lopez (artist)
- Angkan ng Masasama
- Angkan ni Zuma by Jim Fernandez (author) and Mar T. Santana (artist)
- Anino ni Agila
- Anino ni Bathala by Pablo S. Gomez (author) and Nestor Redondo (artist)
- Anino ni Maria Kapra by Greg Igna de Dios (author) and Jun Marcos (artist)
- Anting-Anting ni Dading by Amado S. Castrillo (author) and Alfredo P. Alcala (artist)
- Anuman Ang Sabihin ng Tao by Elena M. Patron (author) and Rudy Florese (artist)
- Apat na Agimat by Clodualdo del Mundo (author) and Fred Carrillo (artist)
- Apat na Alas
- Apat na Anino by Clodualdo del Mundo (author) and Fred Carrillo (artist)
- Apat na Espada
- Apat na Gantimpala
- Apat na Halimaw by Deo Villegas (author) and Nar O. Castro (artist)
- Apat na Mukha ni Eva
- Apat na Taga
- Apoy sa Eden
- Apoy sa Magdamag
- Ara
- Aram by Joe Lad Santos (author) and Al Cabral (artist)
- Araw-Araw Kitang Mahal by Manuel Ramirez (author) and Abe Ocampo (artist)
- A.R.C.H.O.N. (Assistance Response Contingent & Hazard Overseer Network)
- Armino
- Asawang Binili
- Asero by Rod Santiago
- Asintado by Clodualdo del Mundo (author) and Fred Carrillo (artist)
- Aso ni San Roque
- Astrobal by Jim M. Fernandez
- Asuwang by Virgo Villa (author) and Felipe Ilag (artist)
- Asyang ng La Loma by Clodualdo del Mundo (author) and Fred Carrillo (artist)
- Asyong Aksaya (Wasteful Asyo) by Larry Alcala
- At Naghintay si Reynosa…50 Taon
- Atlanta by Rading Mina Sabater
- Atomik Komiks by Alfredo Alcala
- Atoz
- Ay, Naku Neneng!
- Ayokong Tumuntong sa Lupa

== B ==
- Bakas ng Gagamba by Virgilio Redondo and Nestor Redondo
- Barako Komiks
- Barok by Bert Sarile
- Bata Batuta Komiks
- Batch 72 by Budjette Tan and Arnold Arre (artist)
- Bayan Knights
- Bituin Komiks
- Bondying by Mars Ravelo
- Bulaklak Komiks

== C ==
- Captain Barbell by Mars Ravelo and Jim Fernandez (artist)
- Caravana Klasics by Tony Caravana
- Carpool by Syeri Baet
- Combatron by Berlin Manalaysay
- Continental Komiks
- CRAFT Klasix

== D ==
- Dalaga Komiks
- Darna Komiks by Mars Ravelo
- Diamante Komiks
- Dolly and Lavinia Explore the Interverse by Trizha Ko
- Dyesebel by Mars Ravelo and Elpidio Torres (artist)

== E ==
- Educational Klasiks
- Elmer by Gerry Alanguilan
- Enter the Brown Dragon by Jun Dayo
- Espeyal Komiks by Tony Velasquez
- Extra Komiks
- Extra Special Komiks

== F ==
- Facifica Falayfay by Mars Ravelo
- Fiesta Komiks
- Flash Bomba by Mars Ravelo

== G ==
- Gagamba by Virgilio Redondo and Nestor Redondo
- Gwapo Komiks
- Goyo by Mars Ravelo

== H ==
- Halakhak Komiks
- Hiwaga Komiks by Tony Velasquez, Nestor Redondo and Alfredo Alcala
- Holiday Komiks

== I ==
- Ikabod Bubwit by Nonoy Marcelo

== K ==
- Kalayaan by Gio Paredes
- Kamay ni Hugo
- Kambal na Talim by Karl Comendador
- Kapit sa Patalim by Felix Villar and Mario Mijares Lopez (authors) and R. B. Clemente (artist)
- Kapitan Tog by Freely Abrigo
- Kenkoy Komiks
- Kick Fighter Komiks
- Kidlat Komiks
- Kikomachine Komix by Manix Abrera
- Kislap Komiks
- Kubori Kikiam by Michael David
- Kulafu Komiks by Pedrito Reyes (author) Francisco Reyes (artist)
- Kwin by Ollie Roble Samaniego (author) and Zamora (artist)
- Kyut Komiks

== L ==
- Lagim Komiks
- Lapu-Lapu (Lapu-Lapu: The Untold Story by Oli Roble Samaniego; Lapu-Lapu by Francisco V. Coching; Lapu-Lapu by Pilipino Komiks)
- Lastikman by Mars Ravelo
- Libong Higit pa sa BUTONG PAKWAN by Jun R. de Leon (author) and R. Miralles (artist)
- Ligaya Komiks
- Liwayway Komiks
- Lovelife Komiks

== M ==
- Maalaala Mo Kaya? Komiks
- Mabuhay Komiks
- Madyik Komiks
- Maharlika Komiks
- Manila Klasiks
- Markang Agila by Carlo J. Caparas (author) and Joey Otacan (artist)
- Marte Komiks
- Maruja by Mars Ravelo
- Maskarado by Reno Maniquis
- Mga Anak ni Zuma by Jim Fernandez and Mar P. Servicio III (artist)
- Mga Kwentong Barbero 83 by L.P.Calixto (author) and Ben. S. Maniclang (artist)
- Mwahaha

== N ==
- Nardong Tae by Louie Cordero
- Ninja Komiks

== O ==
- OFW Super Stories by Carlo J. Caparas
- Oras Mo Na! by Rudy Fluoresce

== P ==
- Palos Komiks by Nestor Redondo and Virgilio Redondo
- Pantastik Komiks
- Paraluman Komiks
- Pedro Penduko by Francisco V. Coching
- Philippine Adventure & Romance Stories
- Pilipino Komiks
- Pilipino FUNNY Komiks
- Pinoy Komiks
- Pioneer Komiks
- Planet Opdi Eyp by Ron Santiago
- Prinsipe Amante by Clodualdo Del Mundo and Alfredo Alcala (artist)
- Pugad Baboy by Apolonio "Pol" Medina, Jr.
- Pupung by Washington "Tonton" Young
- Puro Wakas Komiks

== R ==
- Rambol Komiks by Gilbert Monsanto
- Redondo Komix by Nestor Redondo
- Redondo's Gagamba Komiks Magazine by Virgilio Redondo and Nestor Redondo
- Rex Komiks
- Romansa Komiks by Elena M. Patron and R.V. Villanueva (artist)
- Romantic Klasiks

== S ==
- Sampaguita Komiks
- Sanduguan Komiks by Gener Pedrina
- Sapot ni Gagamba kasama si Scorpio
- Sentensyador by Karl Comendador
- Shocker Komiks
- Si Janus Sílang at ang Tiyanak ng Tábon novel by Edgar Calabia Samar, adaptation by Carljoe Javier, illustrations by Natasha Ringor (Anino Comics/Adarna)
- Si Janus Sílang at ang Labanang Manananggal-Mambabarang novel by Edgar Calabia Samar, adaptation by Mervin Malonzo (Anino Comics/Adarna)
- Silangan Komiks
- Simbilis ng Kidlat by Renato Mendoza and Leonardo Castro (artist)
- Sixty Six by Russell Molina (writer) and Ian Sta. Maria (artist) (Anino Comics/Adarna)
- Speed Komiks
- Sugbo Jam
- Super Action Pocket Komiks
- Super Fantasy
- Superyor Komiks by Nestor Redondo

== T ==
- Tabloid Komiks by Reno Maniquis
- Tagalog Klasiks
- Teens Weekly Komiks
- The Cannibal by Jim Fernandez and by Hal Santiago (artist)
- The Monkey and the Turtle is the very first known Philippine comics. It was written and illustrated by the national hero of the Philippines Dr. Jose Rizal in 1885 while he was on Paris.
- The Mythology Class by Arnold Arre
- Tiny Tony by Mars Ravelo and Jim Fernandez (artist)
- Topak! Humor Magazine
- Trese by Budjette Tan (author) and Kajo Baldisimo (artist)
- Trip to Tagaytay by Arnold Arre
- Tropa
- True Experience Stories
- True Ghost Stories
- Tsampiyon Komiks
- TSE (Teens Showbiz Entertainment) Tapusan Komiks

== U ==
- UFO Hunter
- United Komiks by Pablo S. Gomez
- Universal Komiks Magazine by Pablo S. Gomez

== V ==
- Varga by Mars Ravelo
- Vista Komiks
- Voltar by Alfredo Alcala

== W ==
- Wang Ho by Rod A. Santiago (author) and Rudy F. Mesina (artist)
- Wasted by Gerry Alanguilan

== Y ==
YanYan Komiks

== Z ==
- Zsazsa Zaturnnah sa Kalakhang Maynila by Carlo Vergara
- Zuma Komiks by Jim Fernandez and Vicatan (artist)

== See also ==
- Philippine comics
- List of Filipino komik artists
- List of Filipino comics creators
- List of Filipino superheroes
