= Hagibis =

Fictional comic superhero

Hagibis (meaning rapidity or speed in Tagalog) is one of the first comic book superheroes in the history of komiks in the Philippines. Hagibis was created in 1947 by Francisco V. Coching, a Filipino comic book artist and illustrator who is considered the "father" or "grandfather" of Filipino comics. Tarzanesque in appearance, the form of Hagibis was also based on another early Filipino comic book hero, Kulafu, who was created by Francisco Reyes. Hagibis was featured in one of the longest-running serials in the history of Filipino comic books, which ran for fifteen years in Liwayway magazine. Hagibis was later featured in a film with Fernando Poe, Sr. as Hagibis.

== See also ==
- Captain Barbell
- Darna
- Lagim
- Ipo-ipo
- Siopawman
- Varga
- Voltar
