= Halakhak Komiks =

Philippine comics magazine

- Halakhak Komiks #1 (1946)

Publication information
- Publisher: Jaime Lucas
- Schedule: Weekly
- Publication date: November 15, 1946
- No. of issues: 10

Creative team
- Created by: Isaac Tolentino; Jaime Lucas
- Written by: various
- Artist(s): various
- Penciller(s): various
- Inker(s): various
- Colorist(s): various
- Editor(s): various

Halakhak Komiks (literally, "Guffaw Comics" or "Laughter Comics") is the first regularly published comics magazine in the Philippines. Its first publication was on November 15, 1946. It was founded by Filipino illustrator Isaac Tolentino and Filipino lawyer Jaime Lucas.

== History ==
Halakhak Komiks was a regular weekly funnies or funny pages comic book that was established after the Second World War through the suggestion of Isaac Tolentino to Jaime Lucas, the owner of a newly established bookstore known as Universal Bookstore located at Azcarraga Avenue (now known as Claro M. Recto Avenue) in the Philippines. At the time, Tolentino (a former cartoonist for T-V-T before World War 2) was looking for a job. Lucas, an admirer of Tolentino’s talent, agreed and accepted Tolentino’s idea because publishing a regularly issued comics-magazine had never been done before in the Philippines. Lucas funded the initial publication of the comics by utilizing his own money and bank loans. Tolentino summoned his pre-war cartooning colleagues.

The printing of the initial issue (Halakhak Komiks #1) was commissioned to the Carmelo and Bauermann, Inc. The office of Halakhak Komiks was located at #665 Evangelista, Quiapo, Manila. Among the Filipino cartoonists who contributed to Halakhak Komiks were Tony Velasquez, Damy Velasquez (brother of Tony Velasquez), J.M. Perez, Elmer Abustan, Gene Cabrera, Francisco V. Coching, Liborio Gatbonton, Fred Carillo, Francisco Reyes, Jose Zabala Santos, Hugo Yonzon, Larry Alcala, Pedro Coniconde, and Lib Abrena.

Initially priced at 25 centavos (Philippine céntimo) per copy, Halakhak was published with 42 pages that were half the size of a regular bond paper due to shortage of paper after World War 2. Later on, it was published as a regular-sized comic book at 40 centavos per copy. Halakhak Komiks was published in ten issues before the company closed due to the naiveté of the managers in the comic book business, financial difficulties, ineffective distribution and advertising strategies, and non-paying comic book agents and distributors.

== Regular comic strips ==
Halakhak Komiks #1 featured comic strips such as Isaac Tolentino’s Mga Hindi Sukat Akalain ("Unexpected Things") and Geslani, Gene Cabrera’s Eto na si Tibo ("Here Comes Tibo"), Jose Zabala Santos’ Si Pino ("Pino"), Francisco Reyes’ Talahib ("Cogon Grass"), Liborio Gatbonton’s Doon daw sa Langit ("It is said that in Heaven..."), Francisco V. Coching’s Bulalakaw ("Comet"), Damy Velasquez's and Jesse Santos' Kidlat ("Lightning"), A. Roullo’s Kasikoy, Noly Panaligan’s Binong, Cris CaGuintuan’s Eniong Bohemio, Hugo Yonzon’s Teryong Alat ("Teryo the Salty"), and Maning de Leon's Indo.

== Regular serials ==
Among the regular serials that were featured in the pages of Halakhak Komiks included Dumlao’s Bernardo Carpio (1947), Francisco V. Coching’s Bulalakaw (from 1946 to 1947), Cris CaGuintuan’s Eniong Bohemio (from 1946 to 1947), Isaac Tolentino’s Mga Hindi Sukat Akalain and Geslani (both from 1946 to 1947), Jose Zabala Santos’ Kani-Kaniya nga Naman ("It Is Really To Each His Own") (from 1946 to 1947), Damy Velasquez’s and Jesse F. Santos’ Kidlat (from 1946 to 1947), Larry Alacala’s Siopawman (1947), and Francisco Reyes’ Talahib (from 1946 to 1947).
