= Voltar =

Voltar may refer to:

- Voltar (comics), an award-winning comics strip and character by Alfredo Alcala
- Voltar (G.I. Joe), a fictional character in the G.I. Joe universe
- Voltar, the main character in the League of Super Evil
- Voltar, the fictional planet that the "expose books" are published on in the Mission Earth fictional universe
- Voltar the Invincible, the U.S. title for Robot Taekwon V
- Voltar the Omniscient, a character in the MOBA Awesomenauts
