= Galema: Anak ni Zuma =

2013–14 Philippine television fantasy drama series

- Title card
- Genre: Action; Fantasy; Horror; Romance
- Created by: ABS-CBN Studios
- Based on: Zuma by Jim Fernandez
- Developed by: ABS-CBN Studios; Ginny Monteagudo-Ocampo
- Written by: Jaja Amarillo; Honey Hidalgo; John Roque; Julius Villanueva
- Directed by: Wenn V. Deramas; Toto Natividad; Alan Chanliongco
- Creative director: Johhny delos Santos
- Starring: Andi Eigenmann; Matteo Guidicelli; Bryan Santos; Meg Imperial; Derick Hubalde
- Opening theme: "Huwag Ganyan" by Laarni Lozada
- Composer: Vincent de Jesus
- Country of origin: Philippines
- Original language: Filipino
- No. of episodes: 130

Production
- Executive producers: Carlo Katigbak; Cory Vidanes; Laurenti Dyogi; Ginny Monteagudo-Ocampo
- Production location: Philippines
- Cinematography: Elmer H. Despa
- Editor: Emerson G. Torres
- Running time: 28-35 minutes
- Production company: GMO Entertainment Unit

Original release
- Network: ABS-CBN
- Release: September 30, 2013 – March 28, 2014

Galema: Anak ni Zuma (transl. Galema: Child of Zuma) is a Philippine television drama fantasy series broadcast by ABS-CBN. The series is based on the comic book Zuma created by Jim Fernandez and the 1987 Philippine film of the same name. Directed by Wenn V. Deramas, Toto Natividad and Alan Chanliongco, it stars Andi Eigenmann, Matteo Guidicelli, Bryan Santos, Meg Imperial, Derick Hubalde and Sheryl Cruz. It aired on the network's Kapamilya Gold line up and worldwide on TFC from September 30, 2013, to March 28, 2014, replacing Dugong Buhay and was replaced by Moon of Desire.

The series was streaming on YouTube.

== Synopsis ==
Galema: Anak ni Zuma began with Galela (Sheryl Cruz), who was raped by Zuma (Derick Hubalde), which resulted in Galema's (Andi Eigenmann) birth. Galela was led to believe that the infant was dead, but her sister Isabel (Sunshine Cruz) had decided to take Galema in as her own.

Galema is able to live a relatively normal, if sheltered, life under her aunt's care, disguising the twin snakes attached to her neck in fake braids. When she comes of age, she is recruited by the military to help them defeat Zuma. Any hope that she has of connecting with her birth mother seems to be crushed when Galela says that she never would have accepted Zuma's child if it had survived.

But despite her mental isolation, she finds a friend in one of her classmates, Morgan (Matteo Guidicelli). After much pining and a rocky beginning to their romance, Morgan proposes to Galema, and she accepts. Gina (Meg Imperial), Galema's cousin and adoptive sister, tries to seduce Morgan one night before the wedding. But, Morgan remains loyal to his future bride and rebuffs Gina's advances.

Morgan and Galema's wedding is interrupted by Galema's half-brother Dean (Kit Thompson), another child of Zuma, and Zuma himself, go to the wedding to get Galema's twin snakes, because he thinks that he will become fully human if he gets Galema's snakes, unaware that he is just another pawn in Zuma's game. In the ensuing battle, Galema's twin snakes are revealed to Galela, revealing her survival to her biological mother. Despite Galela's treatment of her, Galema, longing for her mother's acceptance, does anything her mother wants, including leaving the house.

Galema soon learns that she's pregnant. The impending arrival of her and Morgan's child helps bring Galema and Galela closer. The doctor says that the fetus has a mysterious long creature surrounding the baby's neck. Galema gives birth to a baby boy and a female snake, whom she names Ethan and Sophia, respectively. Morgan loves Ethan but struggles to accept Sophia as his daughter.

Meanwhile, Gina becomes engaged to Joseph (Bodie Cruz). At the engagement party held in Galema and Ethan's house, Joseph encounters Sophia, unaware that she is Galema's child. Believing that the snake is venomous, he lashes out and Sophia fatally bites him to defend herself. Gina, grief-stricken, tries to kill Sophia and to burn her.

Galela is slowly accepting Galema in her life. But, Zuma's poison in her body prevailed, and she becomes Galema's biggest enemy.

At the end, Galema defeats Zuma (but not kill him because Zuma can't die), by putting all her poison in Zuma's body before returning it to him (she managed to behead Zuma in the past). After that, Galema still needs to face her mom. Galela swallows Galema, until Galema can't breathe in her stomach. But, Galela's love for her child Galema prevails. She stabs herself to free Galema, dying from the blood loss

An amulet can make Galema a normal person. However, she gives it Sophia.

Years later, Galema and Morgan's children grow up. At the swimming pool, Zuma appears to get Ethan (Lance Lucido), but before that, Galema shows up and challenges Zuma for a fight.

== Cast and characters ==
=== Main cast ===
- Andi Eigenmann as Galema Carriedo-Villalobos/ Galema Castillo-Villalobos
- Matteo Guidicelli as Morgan Villalobos
- Bryan Santos as Lt. William Barredo
- Meg Imperial as Gina Castillo
- Derick Hubalde as Zuma

=== Supporting cast ===
- Sheryl Cruz as Galela Carriedo
- Sunshine Cruz as Isabel Carriedo-Castillo / Malena
- Carlos Morales as Philip Castillo
- Cris Villanueva as Richard Alvarez
- Dante Ponce as Gen. Roger Barredo
- Divina Valencia as Rosalinda Carriedo
- Lito Legaspi as Agustin "Gustin" Carriedo
- Joey Paras as Teacher Karlo
- Kit Thompson as Dean Evangelista

=== Extended cast ===
- Karla Estrada as Bettina Barredo
- Tess Antonio as Yaya Deborah
- Rubi Ruiz as Emma "Lola Ems" Villalobos
- Boom Labrusca as Louie Villalobos
- Carmen del Rosario as Yaya Bebang

=== Recurring cast ===
- Tippy Dos Santos as Mindy
- Shey Bustamante as Karen
- Carla Valderrama as Beatrice
- Bodie Cruz as Joseph
- Frank Garcia as Bruce
- Lance Serrano as Steve
- Ronie "Atak" Araña as Bonjing
- Pia Moran as Pacita
- Rochelle Barrameda as Elena
- Eagle Riggs as Juni
- DJ Durano as Frederick Kazumi
- Ya Chang as Ken

=== Cameo appearances ===
- Max Laurel as Tatang Entong
- Bing Davao
- Dionne Monsanto as Jessica
- Simon Ibarra as Pepito Villalobos
- Lance Lucido as kid Ethan (finale episode)
- Patricia Coma as kid Sophia (finale episode)

=== Special participation ===
- Ejay Falcon as Sgt. Alexander Pagaran
- Hideo Muraoka as Taizo Orochi / Emperador Tenok
- Brenna Garcia as teen Galema Castillo
- Kazumi Porquez as young Galema Castillo
- Rhed Bustamante as young Gina Castillo

== Reception ==
Galema: Anak ni Zuma charmed TV viewers when it premiered last September 30, 2013, with a 16.6% national TV rating according to data of Kantar Media Philippines, beating Pyra: Babaeng Apoy of GMA Network which only rated 8.3%. It peaked 20.0% on its fifth episode on October 4, 2013.

KANTAR MEDIA NATIONAL TV RATINGS (4:15PM PST)
PILOT EPISODE	FINALE EPISODE	PEAK	AVERAGE	SOURCE
16.6%	15.7%	20.0%	TBA	

== See also ==
- List of programs broadcast by ABS-CBN
- List of ABS-CBN Studios original drama series
