= Bruno (1988 film) =

1988 Filipino film starring Max Laurel

- Directed by: Jun Raquiza
- Written by: Jun Raquiza; Helen Atienza
- Starring: Max Laurel; Ken Snell; Jane Castellvi; Vicky Roa
- Cinematography: Romulo Araojo
- Edited by: Ciriaco Itim
- Music by: Demet Velasquez
- Production company: Shamrock Productions
- Release date: April 1988
- Country: Philippines
- Language: Filipino

Bruno is a 1988 Filipino action film directed by Jun Raquiza and written by Raquiza and Helen Atienza. It stars Max Laurel as the titular character, alongside Ken Snell, Jane Castellvi, and Vicky Roa. Produced by Shamrock Productions, the film was released in early April 1988.

Luciano E. Soriano of the Manila Standard gave Bruno a negative review, criticizing it as a trite entry to the vigilante film genre with forgettable performances, though he commended its bleak cinematography.

== Plot ==
Bruno is a former soldier trained to kill enemies with his bare hands. After his brother and sister die in the hands of a crime syndicate, Bruno takes it upon himself to avenge their deaths.

== Cast ==
- Max Laurel as Bruno
- Ken Snell as Jobo, head of the syndicate
- Jane Castellvi as Jona, Bruno's sister
- Vicky Roa as Bultre
- Dan Corbe
- Jun Ancheta
- Sonny Erang
- Edgar Madriaga
- Jun-Jun Raquiza as Junior
- Nitz O'Leary
- Dixie Lim
- Bebot Davao as Mr. Robles
- Oscar Ramirez
- Bert Giron as Jake
- Angel Medina
- Ben Patri Chavez
- Jimmy Castelvi
- Gina Castelvi

== Critical response ==
Luciano E. Soriano, writing for the Manila Standard, gave Bruno a negative review, stating that it is simply "another rehash of the popular vigilante genre". He considered Max Laurel to have too limited acting skills to carry a film by himself, unlike his titular villain role in the Zuma films where he was aided by make-up and special effects, and expressed that the decision to cast unknowns for the film led to forgettable characters. Soriano noted, however, that the film's best aspect is its bleak cinematography, which generates a suitable atmosphere for the film.
