= Francisco V. Coching =

Filipino comic book writer and illustrator (1919–1998)

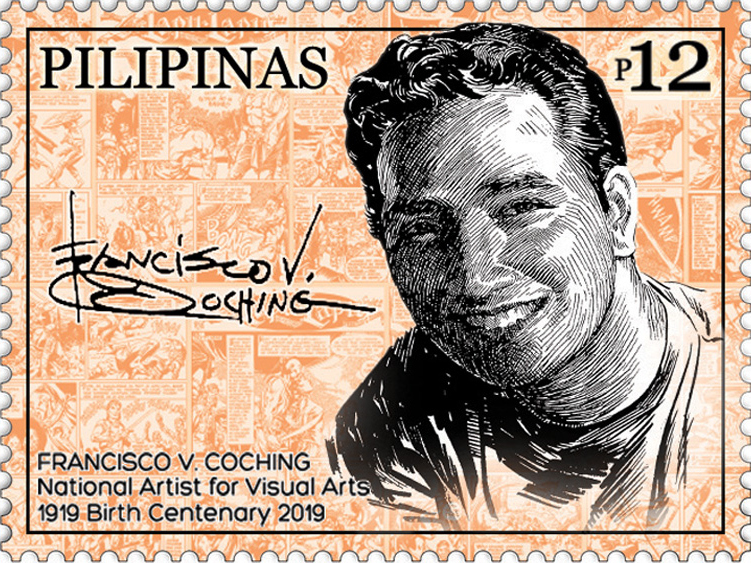
- Born: Francisco Vicente Coching; January 29, 1919 Pasig, Rizal, Philippine Islands
- Died: September 1, 1998 (aged 78)
- Area: Cartoonist
- Notable works: Pedro Penduko; Hagibis
- Awards: Order of National Artists of the Philippines (2014, posthumous) other awards
- Spouse: Filomena Navales
- Children: 5, including Lulu Coching Rodriguez

Francisco Vicente Coching (January 29, 1919 – September 1, 1998) was a Filipino comic book illustrator and writer during the Golden Age of Philippine comics. He is regarded as one of the "pillars of the Philippine Komiks Industry", the "King of Komiks", and the "Dean of Philippine Comics". He created the iconic characters Pedro Penduko, Hagibis, and Sabas, ang barbaro.

In 2014, he was posthumously conferred as a National Artist for Visual Arts, the highest honor for artists in the Philippines.

== Early life ==
Coching was born in Buting, Pasig, Rizal province in the Philippines. He was the son of Gregorio Coching, a Filipino novelist in the Tagalog-language magazine Liwayway.

== Early work and World War II Hunters-ROTC role ==
Coching was unable to finish his studies in order to be an illustrator for Liwayway under the apprenticeship of Tony Velasquez. In 1934, at the age of fifteen, Coching created Bing Bigotilyo (Silahis Magazine). Coching had been influenced by Francisco Reyes, another pioneer in the Filipino comic book industry. In 1935, he created Marabini ("Fierce Maiden", an amazon warrior) in Bahaghari Magazine.

World War II interrupted Coching's career in comics. He became a guerrillero (guerilla) for the Kamagong Unit of the Hunters-ROTC resistance organization.

== Postwar era and the "golden age of Philippine Komiks" ==
After the war, Coching created Hagibis, a character influenced by Reyes's Tarzan-like Kulafu, and achieved fame as a popular komiks artist. Hagibis ran for 15 years in Liwayway magazine and inspired eight film adaptations starting with the first in 1947.

During the 1950s and 1960s, Coching was a leading figure of the "Golden Age of Philippine komiks" and is regarded as having helped shape the national consciousness of the post-colonial Philippines. Many of Coching's works depicted social struggles during the Spanish colonial period, such as Sabas, ang Barbaro ("Sabas, the Barbarian") and Sagisag ng Lahing Pilipino ("Symbol of the Filipino people"). His 1952 work El Indio ("The Indian"), featuring a mestizo protagonist, has been described by Gerry Alanguilan as a work from Coching's mature period.

His oeuvre also spanned diverse genres including comedy, adventure, history, romance, mythology, sex, and horror. Among his best-known works is Pedro Penduko (1954), a story about a folk hero who battles mythical creatures from Philippine folklore. Other notable titles include Bertong Balutan, Don Cobarde, Ang Kaluluwa ni Dante (Dante's Soul), Pagano (Pagan), Haring Ulupong, Dumagit, Lapu-Lapu, Bulalakaw, Waldas, Talipandas, Palasig, Movie Fan, Anak ni Hagibis (a sequel to Hagibis), Gat Sibasib (another sequel to Hagibis), Satur, Dimasalang, Bella Bandida, El Vibora, Sa Ngalan ng Batas, and El Negro. El Negro (1974) was his last komiks novel.

== Retirement and Death ==
After 39 years in the komiks industry, Coching retired in 1973 at the age of 54. Coching was able to produce 53 komiks novels overall. He died at age 78 on September 1, 1998.

== Digital restoration of works and recognition as National Artist ==
In 2004, architect and comic book creator Gerry Alanguilan began the task of digitally restoring Coching's 1952 work "El Indio" after visiting Coching's family and convincing them to allow him to undertake the restoration. This led to the 2009 publication of a digitally restored edition El Indio by the Vibal Foundation, which later also published restored editions of other Coching works. This renaissance of Coching's works preserved the artworks and also made them available to a new generation of Komiks readers, contributing significantly to Coching's recognition as a National Artist of the Philippines in 2014.

== Style ==
Coching was among the few Filipino comics artists who also served as the writer of his own stories, and he is credited with pioneering the visual narrative style of Philippine komiks. Soledad Reyes observed that each panel in Coching's work was skillfully composed with meticulous detail, building up gradually to unfold the narrative with care and deliberation.

The artwork of traditional Philippine komiks, including Coching's, have been described as characterized by a "Baroque" aesthetic, with bold lines and densely detailed backgrounds. The Encyclopedia of Philippine Art published by the Cultural Center of the Philippines notes that Coching's style adhered to the romantic tradition of Philippine komiks, characterized by "dynamic curvilinear lines and tonal modeling, with a fluid undulating effect." Comics historian and artist Gerry Alanguilan wrote that "His brushwork was bold and frenetic; he sculpted figures that seemed to move even when they were standing still."

Art critic Alice Guillermo remarked that Coching's "the acute characterization, the interrelationship of the figures, the general composition, the use of color and tones, as well as the feeling for the natural setting" reveal the influence of 1930s American comic strips artist Hal Foster.

== Legacy ==
The National Commission for Culture and the Arts, which conferred on Coching the title of National Artist, noted that his komiks raised issues of race and identity in the Filipino consciousness. Coching's recurring theme of racial and class struggles in the 19th-century colonial period was later carried over into Philippine cinema. In works such as Lapu-Lapu, Coching was credited with creating "the types that affirm the native sense of self" by portraying strong, independent Malay men. Alma Quinto of the same commission remarked that Coching's works were "about our culture, about our legends. It's our soul, our identity as a Filipinos." Esquire magazine wrote that Philippine pop culture acquired its sense of identity through Coching's komiks, which reflected "the culture and ideals and personalities" of the pre-martial law Philippines.

Coching's works such as Pedro Penduko, which centers on "a heroic everyman" from an indigenous tribe who fights monsters for the people, have been described as fusing traditional folk culture with pop culture. Art curator Patrick D. Flores places Coching alongside muralist Botong Francisco and filmmaker Manuel Conde, arguing that these three National Artists wove folklore and the desires of the masses into their works, portraying a Filipino identity that "cannot easily be confined to expectations of custom or citizenship or even nationalism."

Coching influenced many other Filipino illustrators. Among them were Noly Panaligan, Federico C. Javinal, Carlos Lemos, Celso Trinidad, Emil Quizon-Cruz, Nestor Redondo, Alfredo Alcala, and Emil Rodriguez. Many Filipino comic book artists who gained international recognition were also influenced by Coching; Tony DeZuniga, an artist and co-creator of Jonah Hex and Black Orchid for DC Comics, read Coching's work as a teen, while Steve Gan, artist and co-creator of Star-Lord for Marvel Comics, collected Coching's comics and artwork. Kajo Baldisimo, artist and co-creator of the supernatural series Trese, was also inspired by the artist.

His 1973 illustration of Lapu-Lapu was among the series of national postage stamps based on Philippine comics released on November 15, 2004, by PhilPost. In 2019, his centennial year, a commemorative stamp featuring Coching's self-portrait was issued.

Exhibitions of Coching's works have been held at cultural venues such as Nayong Pilipino Clark (1987), the Cultural Center of the Philippines (2001), and the National Museum of Fine Arts (2009). In 2009, the exhibit Francisco V. Coching: Filipino Master Komiks Artist was held in New York and Hawaii. On Coching's 100th birth anniversary, Ayala Museum held an exhibition titled Images of Nation: F.V. Coching, Komiks at Kultura, which ran from October 30 to February 3, 2019.

== Film adaptations ==
Almost all of Coching's komiks novels were adapted into films, with the exception of three titles. Among those that were made into a film was El Negro in 1974. The Inquirer noted that his works were well-suited for film adaptation because of their cinematic storytelling, brisk pacing, and strong characterization. Notable film adaptations include Hagibis and Sabas, ang Barbaro, both action/adventure stories with elements of fantasy. Pedro Penduko, one of his most famous works, has 6 film adaptations (and counting), 2 small screen adaptations and a couple of cameos.

== Awards ==
In 1981, Coching obtained the Makasining na Komiks Award in the Tanging Parangal for Comics Art from the Manila Commission of Arts and Culture. In 1984, Coching received the Komiks Operation Brotherhood Inc. (KOMOPEB) Life Achievement Award. In 1998, he received the Award of Excellence from the government of Pasay for his contributions to Philippine arts. In 2008, he was given the Gawad CCP Para sa Sining, the highest honor conferred by the Cultural Center of the Philippines to artists.

Coching received the nomination as a National Artist of the Philippines for the Visual Arts in 1999 and in 2001. On June 20, 2014, Coching was posthumously named as a National Artist for the Visual Arts by virtue of Proclamation No. 808, series of 2014.

== Publications ==
Several of Coching's komiks serials have been reissued in collected editions since the 2000s.

- Coching, Francisco V. (2009). Ang Barbaro (A Graphic Novel). Vibal Foundation.
- Coching, Francisco V. (2009). Francisco Coching's El Indio (A Graphic Novel). Vibal Foundation.
- Coching, Francisco V. (2025). Condenado. Vibal Foundation.
- Coching, Francisco V. (2025). Dumagit. Vibal Foundation.
- Coching, Francisco V. (2025). Satur. Vibal Foundation.

== See also ==
- Cris CaGuintuan
- Gerry Alanguilan
