= Hal Santiago =

Filipino illustrator and writer (1941–2021)

Dominador "Hal" Santiago (August 9, 1941 – February 21, 2021) was a Filipino illustrator and writer in the field of Philippine comics (known locally as komiks). Santiago was described by Filipino writer Jim M. Fernandez as the “Raphael of [Philippine comic book] Illustrators”. His illustrations for eight comics series made him one of the most prolific Filipino comic illustrators, second only to Mar T. Santana, who has illustrated 17 series.

== Biography ==
=== Philippines ===
He then became an illustrator for Atlas Publications. Santiago illustrated the characters for Shanghai Joe, a novel authored by Danilo Roman. In the 1970s, Santiago created the Philippine comics novels Pinoy Houdini (Filipino Houdini), Talim (i.e. sharpness [of the edge of a blade, knife, or sword]), and The Hands while working for Graphic Arts Service, Inc. (GASI). Among the other novels Santiago illustrated for GASI were: Sun God, written by Pablo S. Gomez, Saka Natin Itanong sa Diyos (We'll Ask God Later), written by Carlo J. Caparas, Isang Minutong Kasalanan (One-Minute Long Sin), written by Elena M. Patron, and Medusa and Unica (the Spanish word for "unique"), both authored by Jim M. Fernandez.

Santiago wrote and illustrated his own novel, Huling Umaga (Final Morning) while working for Atlas Publications. In collaboration with Federico C. Javinal, he produced the Men of Iron in Monsters of the Universe. Santiago then went on to create other novels such as Zarbot for Aliwan Komiks, Japanese Bat, and Anak ni Zuma (Child of Zuma). Santiago was also the illustrator for Ricardo M. Luna's Mga Bakal at Kalawang (Steel and Rust), a novel featured in Liwayway magazine.

=== United States ===
During the 1970s, Santiago went to the United States to work for Marvel and other American-based comic book companies.

== Influences ==
The young Santiago was influenced by Harold "Hal" Rudolf Foster, a comic book artist from the United States who illustrated the Tarzan (1929) and Prince Valiant characters. Foster was the creator of Prince Valiant. Because he idolized Foster, Santiago exchanged letters with him in 1958 to learn the ropes of comic book illustration. Santiago changed his given name and adopted the name "Hal" after the name Foster used in the comic book industry.

== Death ==
Hal Santiago died on February 21, 2021. He was 80 years old.

== Awards ==
In 1980, Santiago received the Best Illustrator Award from WIKA, an association of Philippine comics distributors. In 1984, WIKA awarded Santiago the Best Written and Illustrated Novel by an Artist Award for his The Hands.

== Works ==
According to John A. Lent, in his book Pulp demons: international dimensions of the postwar anti-comics campaign, Santiago's novel The Hands is regarded as "one of the most successful fantasy stories in Philippine comics". A serial that began in 1980, the plot of The Hands is about 'a pair of super-strong, telekinetic, "chopped-off, one eyed living hands.'" On the other hand, Santiago's The Gorgon – a serial Santiago created together with Jim Fernandez – is about a character with a "snake-infested hairdo".

The following is an enumeration of Santiago’s published works arranged according to the title of the novel, followed by the comic book where it appeared, and the year(s) of publication:

- 13 Little Fingers, Holiday Komiks (1986–1987)
- 666, Pinoy Klasiks (1986–1988)
- Ang Asong Itim sa Gulod, Fantasia Komiks (1967)
- Ang Bukas ay Walang Hanggan, Liwayway (1966)
- Ang Kampana sa Santa Quiteria, Continental Komiks (1970–1971)
- Bakawan, Holiday Komiks (1980)
- Banaba, Holiday Komiks (1979)
- Blood Sweat and Fear, Shocker Komiks (1987)
- Bob Steel, Holiday Komiks (1981–1984)
- Buntala, Planet Komiks (1968–1969)
- Captain Crossbone, Aguila Qualikomiks (1986)
- Chiradee Suterisasok, Aliwan Komiks (1986–1987)
- Combat Dragons, Commander Qualikomiks (1986)
- Cowboy Domino, Pinoy Klasiks (1991–1992)
- Danny Comet, Holiday Komiks (1979–1980)
- Dimalupig, Aliwan Komiks (1972)
- Durando, United Komiks (1969–1970)
- Erickson, Holiday Komiks (1978–1979)
- Faded Star, Damdamin Komiks (1988–1989)
- Florinda, Tagalog Klasiks (1972)
- Galaxy of Horror, Space Horror Comix (1988)
- Gallery of Terror, Pinoy Komiks (1987–1988)
- Garnet, Teens Weekly Komiks (1983–1984)
- Gumgum, Aliwan Komiks (1990)
- Hell and High Adventures, Pinoy Komiks (1988–1989)
- Hercules (The Return), Aliwan Komiks (1992)
- Hogarth: The Ape Man, Pinoy Klasiks (1989–1990)
- Horus, Aliwan Komiks (1991–1992)
- Hulog ng Impiyerno (1966–1967), Lagim Komiks (1966–1967)
- Inca, Teens Weekly Komiks (1970s)
- Karugtong Ka ng Hininga Ko, Romansa Komiks (1992)
- Katwin en Dolly, Pinoy Klasiks (1988–1989)
- Kongga, Pinoy Klasiks (1983–1984)
- Kontra-Bandido, Pilipino Reporter Komiks (1972)
- Kroko, Klasik Komiks (2007)
- Kulatog, Pioneer Komiks (1988–1990)
- Kuwatro, United Komiks (1969)
- Kuwatro Kondenado, Pioneer Komiks (1981–1983)
- Medusa, Pinoy Komiks (1984)
- Mga Ligaw na Punglo, Espesyal Komiks (1971)
- Mga Limot na Kasaysayan, Lagim Komiks (1964)
- Mga Reynang Walang Trono, Bondying Movie Specials (1974–1975)
- Monsters of the Universe, Kilabot Qualikomiks (1986)
- Mister Flo, Precious Komiks (1983–1984)
- Nalibing Nang Buhay, Superstar Komiks (1970–1972)
- Onono, Holiday Komiks (1983–1984)
- Parcenet Isolde, Estudyante Komiks (2007)
- Pinoy Houdini, Pinoy Komiks (1993–1994)
- Pipay, Pinoy Komiks (1983–1984)
- Prinsipeng Walang Gulat, Lagim Komiks (1964)
- Pubring Alindahaw, United Komiks (1970)
- Roman Bunganga, Precious Komiks (1978–1979)
- Sakmal sa Dilim, Aliwan Komiks (1983–1984)
- Sarang, Pioneer Komiks (1991–1992)
- Shanghai Joe, Tagalog Klasiks (1977–1978)
- Sirenita, Pinoy Komiks (1987–1989)
- Talim, Pioneer Komiks (1978–1979)
- Tatlong Hari, United Komiks (1964–1966)
- Tender is the Night, Superstar Komiks (1981–1982)
- The Cannibal, Aliwan Komiks (1977–1983)
- The Gorgon, Pinoy Komiks (1977–1981)
- The Hands, Pioneer Komiks (1977–1983)
- The Hands in the Lost World, Pinoy Klasiks (1990–1991)
- The Horrifying Nightmares of Father and Son, Nightmare Komiks (1988–1991)
- The New Ultra-Mega Adventures of Astrobal, Pinoy Komiks (1990–1991)
- The Singing Samurai, Shogun Qualikomiks (1986)
- The Stranger, Bondying Movie Specials (1972–1973)
- Tierra Sagrada, Lagim Komiks (1967)
- Twilight Land, Super Fantasy Komiks (1987)
- Unica, Aliwan Komiks (1983–1984)
- Valentina, United Komiks (1968)
- Vengadora, Kidlat Komiks (1969)
- Vog, Aliwan Komiks (1989–1990)
- Weird Fantasy, Holiday Komiks (1987)
- Winterela, Kuwento Komiks (1986–1987)
- Zarbot, Aliwan Komiks (1987–1989)
- Zuma-Maria, Pinoy Komiks (1989–1990)
