= Virgilio Redondo =

Filipino comic book writer and artist (1926–1997)

- Born: Virgilio Redondo y Purugganan; March 28, 1926 San Esteban, Ilocos Sur, Philippine Islands
- Died: April 13, 1997 (aged 71) Caloocan, Metro Manila, Philippines
- Areas: Writer, Penciller, Inker

Virgilio "Virgil" Redondo y Purugganan (March 28, 1926 – April 13, 1997) was a Filipino comic book writer and artist.

== Biography ==
=== Early life ===
Redondo was born in the town of San Esteban, Ilocos Sur, Philippines, the eldest of eight children.

=== Early work ===
Redondo started as a staff and advertising artist. He worked, along with his younger brothers Nestor Redondo, Francisco "Quico" Redondo, and Sisenando Redondo Jr., on a newspaper.

On December 15, 1948, he published his komik serial Mahiwagang Bundok. His first cartoon comic strip was "Isyo", a humorous strip from Pilipino Komiks. In the 1950s Virgil started to work at Ace Publication Incorporated aided by Tony Velasquez. His writing became successful with Diwani in 1951 and Reyna Bandida in 1952. The latter was adapted into a movie by Sampaguita Pictures, starring Alicia Vergel. Then followed Tin-edyer in 1953, Talusaling in 1955 and Aling Kutsero in 1956, in which Nida Blanca appeared, released by LVN Pictures. He also created Alyas Palos, Bakas ng Gagamba, Panginoon, Ang Mga Lawin, Vod-a-vil, Teen-age Crush, Anak ng Kidlat and Rolling Rockers.

=== CRAF Publications ===
In April 1963 Virgilio Redondo and a group of writers and illustrator founded CRAF Publications, initially named after Amado Castrillo, Tony Caravana, Virgil Redondo, Nestor Redondo, Alfredo Alcala and Jim Fernandez. Their first comic was Redondo Komiks, released on May 7, 1963. CRAF introduced many titles, such as Alcala's Fight Komiks, Amado's Lovers Komiks, Craf Klasix, and Magic Comics. The firm shut down in 1968.

=== Collaboration with other writers ===
Redondo teamed up with Gilda Olvidado to illustrate the short stories "May Sopresa Ang Pag-ibig," "Ang Paborito", and "Narito ang Anak, Narito ang Ina." He demonstrated his artwork in Rico Bello Omagap's novel Bathaluman Sino Ka? and Putik sa Mukha ng Birhen.

=== Other works ===
Virgil also worked at Marvel Comics. As both penciller and inker, he contributed to Planet of the Apes, Unknown Worlds of Science Fiction, Solomon Kane, Savage Sword of Conan #20, Tomb of Dracula, Tales of the Zombie, and Vampire Tales.

He also worked as an Illustrator with Vincent Fago for Pendulum Illustrated Classics on the adaptation of Nathaniel Hawthorne's The Scarlet Letter.

=== Death ===
Redondo died on April 13, 1997, and rests at Eternal Garden at East Bagong Barrio, Caloocan.
