= Max Laurel =

Filipino actor and bodybuilder

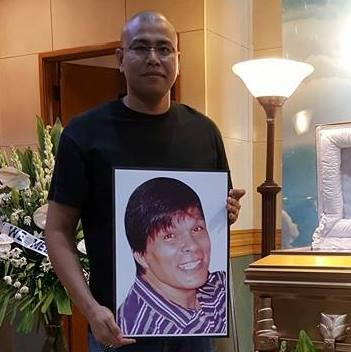
- Laurel's son holding a portrait of Max at his wake in 2016
- Born: Maximo G. Laurel; May 4, 1945; Zamboanga City, Commonwealth of the Philippines
- Died: June 11, 2016 (aged 71); Quezon City, Philippines
- Resting place: La Loma Cemetery; Caloocan, Philippines
- Occupations: Actor, bodybuilder
- Years active: 1975–2016

Max Laurel (May 4, 1945 – June 11, 2016), was a Filipino actor and bodybuilder who played as Zuma in the 1985 film Zuma and 1987 film Anak ni Zuma.

== Personal life ==
Max Laurel was born in Zamboanga City, Philippines on May 4, 1945. He married a woman named Alicia Laurel.

== Death ==
On June 11, 2016, Laurel had a cardiac arrest leading to his death. He was 71 years old. His wake took place on June 15, 2016, at La Funeraria Paz in Quezon City. He was buried on June 16, 2016, at La Loma Cemetery in Caloocan. He had three children and five grandchildren.

== Filmography ==
=== Film ===
Year	Title	Role	Note(s)	Ref(s).
1975	Tatak ng Alipin			
1976	Alakdang Gubat			
1976	Mga Uhaw Na Bulaklak, Part 2			
1976	Sapagka't Kami'y Mga Misis Lamang			
1977	Totoy Bato			
1978	Ang Lalaki, ang Alamat, ang Baril			
1979	Durugin si Totoy Bato			
1979	Haring Cobra			
1980	Mission: Terrorize Panay			
1980	Ang Panday			
1981	Sierra Madre			
1981	Ang Maestro			
1981	Labanang Lalaki			
1981	Bandido sa Sapang Bato			
1982	D'Wild Wild Weng			
1982	Alyas Big Boy			
1982	Bilanggo: Prison No. 10069			
1982	Bad Boy from Dadiangas			
1983	Ang Krus ng Monte Piedra			
1983	Kapag Buhay ang Inutang			
1983	Tatak ng Yakuza			
1983	Dito sa Balat ng Lupa			
1984	Wanted: Dead or Alive – Nardong Putik (Kilabot ng Cavite)			
1985	Zuma	Zuma		
1986	Bagong Hari			
1986	Rocky Tan-go IV			
1987	Anak ni Zuma	Zuma		
1988	Robowar	Quang		
1988	Bruno	Bruno		
1990	Sgt. Clarin: Bala para sa Ulo Mo	Sgt. Clarin		
1990	Walang Piring ang Katarungan			
1992	Ipaglaban Mo Ako, Boy Topak			
1992	Lacson: Batas ng Navotas			
1992	Lucio Margallo	The mayor		
1992	Shotgun Banjo			
1993	Dugo ng Panday	Marag		
1993	Gascon, Bala ang Katapat Mo			
1994	Alyas Boy Ama: Tirador			
1994	Capt. Jack Nayra: Alas ng Makati Police			
1994	Kanto Boy 2: Anak ni Totoy Guapo	Igay		

=== Television ===
Year	Title	Role	Note(s)	Ref(s).
2013	Jim Fernandez's Galema: Anak ni Zuma	Tatang Entong		
