= Sabas, ang barbaro =

1952 film

- Directed by: Enrique Moreno
- Story by: Francisco V. Coching
- Based on: Sabas by Francisco V. Coching
- Starring: Tita Duran; Pancho Magalona; Tessie Martinez
- Distributed by: Sampaguita Pictures
- Release date: 1952
- Country: Philippines
- Language: Filipino

Sabas, ang barbaro (lit. 'Sabas, The Barbarian') is a 1952 Philippine historical adventure film, based on Francisco V. Coching's eponymous comics series. Directed by Enrique Moreno and written by Francisco Coching, it stars Pancho Magalona, and Tita Duran with Tessie Martinez.

== Cast ==
- Pancho Magalona as Sabas
- Tita Duran
- Tessie Martinez
- Bert Olivar
- Tony Cayado
- Jose de Villa
- Chicháy
- Pedro Faustino
- Totoy Torrente
- Martin Marfil
- Olive La Torre
