= Siopawman =

Filipino cartoon character

- Siopawman character
- First appearance: Halakhak Komiks; (1947)
- Created by: Lauro Zarate Alcala

In-universe information
- Species: Human
- Gender: Male
- Occupation: Superhero
- Nationality: Filipino

Siopawman (literally, "Steamed bun Man") was a Filipino comedic cartoon superhero character created in 1947 by Larry Alcala . It was also the title of the first comic strip created by Filipino cartoonist Lauro "Larry" Zarate Alcala after World War II.

== Description ==
Siopawman was described by writer Karl Gillespie as an “ugly”, big-nosed, fat-bodied and bald-headed superhero. His costume had an “S” mark on the chest. The super-abilities of Siopawman included being bulletproof and being “immune from normal humans”. Siopawman also had a sidekick named Okboy, who often addressed Siopawman as “Siops”. Although Siopawman's real identity is unknown, his enemies include Jelloman, Man-Hid, She-Mangot, She-Pilyo, She-Bat, She-Pon, She-Feet, Chopperman, Wesley "Kulang-Kulang" Moreno, Gene "Nguso" Castro, Gabrael "Mongoloid" Santos, Rene Jose "Ulo" Dalupan, and Marc Christian "Aspalto" Ontiveros. Siopawman is regarded as the first humorous superhero in the Philippines, but not as the "first true Filipino superhero".

== History ==
Siopawman first appeared in Halakhak Komiks ("halakhak" means laughter in Tagalog) in 1947. Siopawman was described as a “Superman parody”. After Halakhak, Siopawman became a feature series in the pages of Philippines Daily Express from 1972 to 1983. Siopawman reappeared in the reborn Daily Express in 2002.

== Animated short ==
In 2003, Siopawman got a short animated film of the same name. The film is about 2 minutes. The film was also directed by Kinjo Estioko and Pete Jimenez.

== See also ==
- Ipo-ipo
- Varga
- Lagim
- Darna
- Captain Barbell
- Voltar
