= Lagim =

Publication information
- Publisher: ACE Publications
- First appearance: Pilipino Komiks, #60 (September 17, 1949)
- Created by: Cris CaGuintuan

In-story information
- Species: Human
- Place of origin: Philippines
- Partnerships: Levy
- Abilities: Possessing a headgear that gives him super strength

Lagim (meaning "dread" or "terror" in Tagalog) is one of the first Filipino superhero characters in the Philippines. He was created by Filipino artist Cris CaGuintuan. Lagim's first appearance was in the pages of Pilipino Komiks #60 (ACE Publications) in 1947 or 1949. His sidekick was a boy named Levy, a young lad he saved in the past, and wore a costume similar to the uniform worn by Robin, the sidekick of the American superhero Batman.

== Character background ==
In fighting Japanese soldiers during World War II in the Philippines, Lagim wore a headgear that provided him with superstrength. The headgear came from Dr. Malasakit (literally "Dr. Car[ing]" or "Dr. Concerned", a scientist. Because of the headgear, Lagim became twice stronger than a normal human being. Lagim had a vulnerability, he can be injured by bullets.

== See also ==
- Siopawman
- Ipo-ipo
- Varga
- Darna
- Captain Barbell
- Voltar
