= Ukala =

Comic strip of 1950s Philippines

Ukala (Ang Walang Suko)
- Page for first release in Pilipino Komiks, 1950s

Publication information
- Publisher: Pilipino Komiks
- Genre: see below
- Publication date: 1950s
- Main character(s): Ukala

Creative team
- Created by: Alfredo Alcala

Ukala (Ang Walang Suko), meaning "Ukala (The Unrelenting)" [i.e. the one who doesn't give up] was a comic strip title in Philippine comics. The main character in the comic book story is Ukala. Ukala was created in the 1950s by distinguished Filipino illustrator Alfredo Alcala. Ukala, the character, was a Native American Indian or "Amerindian". The story, written and illustrated by Alcala for Filipino readers, was about the adventures of Native American Indians set at a timeline when the first Europeans arrived in the Northwestern region of the Americas. Ukala was adapted into film as Ukala (Ang Walang Takot), meaning "Ukala (The Fearless)" in the Tagalog language. It appeared on the pages of the Philippine comic book named Pilipino Komiks. It had been made into movie by Sampaguita Pictures, directed by Artemio B. Tecson in 1954. Leading performers were Cesar Ramirez in the title role and Alicia Vergel as Margarita.

== Collected editions ==
Title	Volume	Issue	Date
Ukala	Pilipino Komiks	#126	March 29, 1952
Ukala	Pilipino Komiks	#149	February 14, 1953
Ukala	Pilipino Komiks	#156	May 23, 1953
Ukala	Pilipino Komiks	#169	November 21, 1953

== See also ==
- Voltar
