= Luis Katigbak =

Filipino writer

Luis Joaquin Katigbak (26 July 1974 – 20 April 2016) was a Filipino writer and music critic. He was a resident writer for PULP Magazine, a columnist for The Philippine Star, and an associate editor for Esquire Philippines.

He was a graduate of the University of the Philippines (UP). From being a mathematics major, he shifted to creative writing.

Katigbak was a recipient of four Palanca Awards, a Philippine Graphic prize, and a Young Artists' Grant from the National Commission for Culture and the Arts (NCCA). His books Happy Endings, a collection of short stories; and The King of Nothing to Do, a collection of essays, were nominated in the National Book Awards by the Manila Critics Circle. His last book, Dear Distance, was released in March 2016.

== Death ==
Katigbak had been hospitalized since December 2015 for complications from diabetes. On April 10, 2016, he suffered an "extensive" stroke and the doctor stated that recovery was no longer possible. He died on April 20, 2016, at the age of 41.
