= Ikabod Bubwit =

Comic book

Ikabod Bubwit (literally "Ikabod the Small Rodent", "Ikabod the Small Rat", or "Ikabod the Mouse") is a fictional character created by Nonoy Marcelo, and serves as an allegory of the socio-political woes of ordinary Filipinos.

He is among the characters for which Marcello is best known. The satirical comic strip about Ikabod Bubwit ran from the late 1970s through 2002.

== Design ==
Ikabod Bubwit himself is considered as the most famous mouse character created by Marcelo. As the title character in the comic strip Ikabod, Ikabod Bubwit was the humorous representation of the socio-political woes of ordinary Filipinos.

=== Inspirations ===
The comic strip was used at times by Marcelo to reference and portray Filipino political figures, including Ferdinand Marcos, Cory Aquino, Joseph Estrada, and Gloria Macapagal Arroyo. Marcelo depicted Ikabod Bubwit as an “irreverent mouse” with “funny antics” who lived in Dagalandia (literally "Mouseland" or "Ratland"). Ikabod's hometown, Dagalandia, was described as a “recast” of “the Philippines as a nation” with “an apt mirror image for the turbulent setting of the Philippines” during the present and in the past.

== See also ==
- Barok
- List of fictional rodents
