= Pupung =

Philippine comic strip

- Cover of The Best of Pupung (1992)
- Author(s): Tonton Young
- Current status/schedule: Ongoing
- Launch date: December 15, 1983
- Publisher(s): Manila Bulletin
- Genre(s): Humor, family life, satire

Pupung is a daily comic strip created by Filipino cartoonist Washington "Tonton" Young. Appearing in the broadsheet Manila Bulletin, the strip revolves around its title character, a young boy, and his family and household. Pupung's family maintains a lugawan, a restaurant which mainly serves rice congee (Filipino lugaw) dishes.

== History ==
Pupung debuted as My Little Pupung in the newspaper Tempo on December 15, 1983. The strip later moved to Times Journal, where it remained until January 1986, when Young was fired after spoofing a radio campaign advertisement for then President Ferdinand Marcos. Soon after the First EDSA Revolution in February 1986, Young moved to the Manila Bulletin, where the strip appears to this day.

Originally printed in black and white, it has been published in color in recent years.

Several book-length compilations have been published, starting with The Best of Pupung in 1992. Succeeding compilations have been titled sequentially (The Best of Pupung 2, The Best of Pupung 3, etc.), although the tenth in the series is designated as The Best of Pupung 0 as it featured many early strips; the designated tenth compilation that would continue the sequential order of publications was eventually released three years after The Best of Pupung 0.

== Characters ==
- Pupung: the title character. He is a generally well-mannered young boy of unknown age. Among the main characters, he is the only child; he is also mostly the voice of reason to the many adult characters in the strip. He is based on the cartoonist's nephew, Jeff Young.
- Daddy: Pupung's bespectacled father. Having an unknown profession and at times running the lugawan, he is also hardworking and caring for his son. He is mostly based on Young himself, though the cartoonist never voices out through this character. Young was caricatured in another Filipino comic strip, Pugad Baboy by Pol Medina, Jr.; his caricature of Young resembles Pupung's father.
- Mommy: Pupung's caring mother. She worked in the United States for an indeterminate number of time, but has since returned to be with her family. She appeared in the first strip of the series in 1983, but has made sporadic appearances between then and the mid-1990s. While Mommy is based from Young's sister, Jeff's mother, her return from her long-term absence mirrors the cartoonist's marriage to Liberty Lacson in 1995.
- Dom (sometimes Domingo or Lolo Dom): Pupung's grandfather (lolo) and Daddy's father. He directly manages the lugawan and attempts to set up various other businesses for additional income. Bald and having a prominent long chin, Dom is mostly amiable, but is also prone to anger when his appearance is made fun of. He is also prone to lust after younger women (thus he is nicknamed a "dirty old man", or "D.O.M.").
- Day (or rarely Inday) is the household maid who also works as a helper in the lugawan and Pupung's guardian. She is obese and gluttonous, and even somewhat lazy. Despite her obesity, she is very strong, as she can lift heavy objects with ease. Her often short temper leads to several quarrels. She is often shown stealing food for her own consumption. Day is based on Young's own housemaid. According to one comic strip, Dom reveals that she was as thin as Olive Oyl; she only became obese due to her habit of eating most of their food.
- Jordan is the household's dwarf servant who also works in the lugawan. He has the same height as Pupung, but his mustache gives away his age. He is frequently at odds with Day. He also has prominent upper teeth, resembling fangs. Often his diminutive size is used for jokes.
- Lelong is Pupung's great-grandfather (lelong is used similar to lolo) and father to Dom, whom he resembles. His advanced age and gaunt, withered appearance are subjects for humor.
- Larry Bird is the family pet, a wisecracking parrot who often mocks the other characters.

Minor characters include Doglas, a pet dog, various other pets and relatives of Day and Jordan.

== Style ==
Besides domestic life, Pupung also focuses on Philippine pop culture and business trends, as well as the cartoonist's fascination with basketball. The strip very rarely tackles political issues.

The humor of the strip mostly depends on slapstick, visual gags and juxtaposition of familiar images, either resulted by a mishap or as part of several characters' plans. The strip also uses verbal humor, usually puns. Jokes often revolve on the physical attributes of the characters, such as Dom's chin size, Day's weight problem or Jordan's height.

The humor used in the strip is lighter than other Filipino comic strips which gives it a family-oriented theme. Tonton Young's younger brother Alex used the same light-hearted brand of humour in his own comic strip, Pro Kids.

== Restaurant ==
A restaurant based on the comic strip was opened by Dennis Nakpil in 1986. The restaurant started as an open-air stand which served Filipino dishes such as tapsilog, tosilog, and goto with egg.

A branch operates at the SM Mall of Asia under the name Pupung & Friends. It features more Filipino dishes on the menu, such as pork sisig and lechon kawali. It even has montages of the comic strip on the walls.

== See also ==
- Philippine comics
- List of Filipino komik artists
