= Barok =

Filipino comic character

Barok is considered one of the most popular Comic characters in the Philippines,, It was created by Filipino cartoonist Bert Sarile in 1973. It also means Sillano. A stone-age Philippine comic book character, Barok was described by Sarile as a lead character and one of the equivalents in the Philippine comic book industry of the American cartoon characters in The Flintstones. Barok was illustrated in komiks by Sarile as a “pre-historic caveman” who carried a “large spiked club”.

== Comic book version ==
Barok was featured weekly in the pages of Hiwaga Komiks. Conceived by Bert Sarile as a character of ethnic background that mirrored the “Filipino foibles in a primitive-age setting”, Barok was the more contemporary substitute to Bondying, a postwar Filipino comic book character. Barok was the first character in the Philippines that was created within a stone-age setting.

== Film version ==
Later on, Barok had been featured in three Philippine films. A 1979 version of the film starred Filipino actor and comedian Chiquito as Barok. The 1976 film is an official entry of the 1976 Metro Manila Film Festival.

== Book version ==
Barok was one of the few Filipino comic book series or comic strips that was compiled and published in book format. The 130-page, digest size, and black-and-white book version of Barok was published in 2004 by Pacyno Publishing, Co, Inc. and was distributed by National Book Store.

== See also ==
- Ikabod Bubwit
