= Arnold Arre =

Filipino comic book writer

- Born: Clem Arnold Lawrence Arre; September 2, 1971 (age 55) Metro Manila, Philippines
- Areas: Writer, Artist
- Notable works: The Mythology Class, Ang Mundo ni Andong Agimat, Milkyboy (Animated Short Film), Halina Filipina, Trip to Tagaytay
- Spouse: Cynthia Bauzon Arre

Clem Arnold Lawrence Arre (born September 2, 1971) is a Filipino comic book writer, artist and filmmaker. He is best known for his graphic novels The Mythology Class (1999) and Ang Mundo ni Andong Agimat (2006), and adult animated short films exploring themes of death, resistance, and the timeless struggle for freedom.

== Career ==
The Mythology Class, which blended ancient Philippine mythology with modern urban legends in a contemporary aesthetic, has been described as "genre-breaking", and has the distinction of being the first graphic novel to win in the Manila Critics Circle National Book Awards Comic Books category.

Arre's other titles include the romantic comedy After Eden (2002), Ang Mundo ni Andong Agimat (2006), and "Martial Law Babies" (2008).

Aside from his comics work, Arre did numerous design and illustration jobs for various clients such as the San Miguel Foundation for the Performing Arts and Sony BMG Music Entertainment Philippines. He also took part in local and international group exhibits and has had a one-man fantasy-themed show, Mythos in 2000.

In 2007, producer Tony Gloria of Unitel Productions optioned the film rights to Arre's novel Ang Mundo ni Andong Agimat. Arre has mentioned in an April 2014 interview that the project is still under development.

In 2011, Arre studied the art of animation and made a 4-minute short film titled Andong Agimat: Kanya ang Kalye based on the main character in his book Ang Mundo ni Andong Agimat. In November 2011 he was commissioned by Gang Badoy of Rock Ed Philippines and the National Historical Commission of the Philippines (NHCP) to make an animated music video for Kaninong Anino in celebration of the 150th birth anniversary of Filipino hero Jose Rizal. The following year, he was commissioned by Rock Ed Philippines and the NHCP to make an animated music video for Lupang Hinirang, the Philippine National Anthem which was broadcast on national television on June 12, 2012, Independence Day (Philippines). In September 2012, he did a series of educational animated videos titled Tandaan. Kalayaan. Alagaan. to mark the 40th anniversary of the Philippines' freedom from Martial Law. The series was commissioned by Rock Ed Philippines and the National Youth Commission (Philippines).

In July 2013, Arre finished his first 20-minute animated short film titled Milkyboy.

== Awards ==
Arnold Arre has won National Book Awards from the Manila Critics Circle for his graphic novels The Mythology Class (1999), a four-part action-adventure miniseries and Trip to Tagaytay (2000), a one-shot future fiction short story.

Milkyboy went on to win awards at the 25th Gawad CCP Para Sa Alternatibong Pelikula in November 2013, the 7th Animahenasyon (Philippine Animation Festival) in November 2013, and the 30th Los Angeles Asian Pacific Film Festival (LAAPFF) in May 2014, where Arre was awarded the Linda Mabalot New Directors/New Visions Award, presented to a short film that demonstrates innovative and original use of cinematic language and vision.

== Personal life ==
Arre is based in Quezon City and is married to graphic designer Cynthia Bauzon.

== Works ==
=== Animated films ===
Year	Original title	English title	Awards
2011	Andong Agimat: Kanya ang Kalye		Best Animation, 1-5 min. Short Film Category and Special Jury Prize at 7th Animahenasyon (Philippine Animation Festival)
2011	Kaninong Anino		Best Animation, Music Video Category, 7th Animahenasyon (Philippine Animation Festival)
2012	Lupang Hinirang: The Philippine National Anthem		
2013	Freedom from Martial Law Series		
2013	Milkyboy		Winner, Linda Mabalot New Directors/New Visions Award, 30th Los Angeles Asian Pacific Film Festival 1st Prize Winner, Animation Category, The 25th CCP Independent Film & Video Festival Best Screenplay, 7th Animahenasyon (Philippine Animation Festival) In Competition, Golden Kuker-Sofia Animation Festival

=== Graphic novels ===
- Self-published

Year of release	Title	Notes
1999	The Mythology Class	Winner, Best Comic Book - 19th Manila Critics Circle National Book Awards
2000	Trip to Tagaytay	Winner, Best Comic Book - 20th Manila Critics Circle National Book Awards
2006	Ang Mundo ni Andong Agimat	Film rights optioned by Unitel Productions in 2007

- Published by Adarna House

Year of release	Title	Notes
2002	After Eden	
2005	The Mythology Class Special Collected Edition	Winner, Best Comic Book - 2000 Manila Critics Circle National Book Awards

- Published by Nautilus Comics

Year of release	Title	Notes
2008	Martial Law Babies	
2019	The Children of Bathala Volume 1	
2021	The Children of Bathala Volume 2	

- Commissioned Work
  - Pencils, Inks and Colors for "Rodski Patotski: Ang Dalagang Baby" by Gerry Alanguilan (2014, Komikero Publishing)
  - Pencils, Inks, and Colors for "Stargazer" by Luis Katigbak (2014, The Philippine Star)
  - Pencils, Inks and Colors for La Perdida, Graphic Classics Volume 20: Western Classics (2010, Eureka Productions)
  - Pencils, Inks and Colors for A Whisper in the Dark, Graphic Classics Volume 18:Louisa May Alcott (2009, Eureka Productions)
  - Pencils, Inks and Colors The Wit of Porportuk, Graphic Classics Volume 2:Jack London (2006, Eureka Productions)
  - Illustration for Graphic Classics:Sir Arthur Conan Doyle (2002, Eureka Productions)
  - Illustration for Graphic Classics: H. P. Lovecraft (2002, Eureka Productions)
  - Cover for Graphic Classics: Jack London volume 1 (2003, Eureka Productions)
  - Pencils and Inks for Lastikman (2004, Mango Comics)
  - Pencils and Inks for Baguio, 1966, Siglo: Freedom (2003/2004, Mango Comics)
  - 21-page comic for Graphic Classics:Jack London volume 2 - The Wit of Porportuk (2006, Eureka Productions)
  - Illustrated for Cast:Issue 10 by Jamie Bautista (2006, Nautilus Comics)
  - Illustrated for Cast:Issue 11 by Jamie Bautista (2007, Nautilus Comics)
  - Illustrated for Private Iris

=== Design projects ===
- Album packaging illustration:

Year of release	Title	Notes
1996	Revenge of the Fishlips Keltscross	Released by BMG Records Pilipinas, Inc.
2001	Little Monsters Under Your Bed The Itchyworms	Released by Viva Records
2001	One More Ryan Cayabyab	Released by BMG Records Pilipinas, Inc
2002	Sacred Works of Ryan Cayabyab Ryan Cayabyab	Released by BMG Records Pilipinas, Inc
2004	Great Original Pilipino Music Ryan Cayabyab	Released by BMG Records Pilipinas, Inc
2004	The Eraserheads Anthology The Eraserheads	Released by BMG Records Pilipinas, Inc
2004	Bomb Threat Sexbomb Girls	Released by BMG Records Pilipinas, Inc Finalist, Best Music Packaging Awit Awards
2005	Sharon Sings Alcasid Sharon Cuneta	Released by Sony BMG Music Entertainment
2005	UltraelectromagneticJam Tribute album for the Eraserheads	Released by Sony BMG Music Entertainment Finalist, Best Music Packaging Awit Awards
2006	The 2-in-1 Series: Sandwich Sandwich	Released by Sony BMG Music Entertainment
2006	The 2-in-1 Series: Yano Yano	Released by Sony BMG Music Entertainment
2006	The 2-in-1 Series: Color it Red Color it Red	Released by Sony BMG Music Entertainment
2006	The 2-in-1 Series: Sugar Hiccup Sugar Hiccup	Released by Sony BMG Music Entertainment
2006	The 2-in-1 Series: The Company The Company	Released by Sony BMG Music Entertainment
2006	The 2-in-1 Series: Wolfgang Wolfgang	Released by Sony BMG Music Entertainment
2006	The 2-in-1 Series: Francis M Francis M	Released by Sony BMG Music Entertainment
2006	The 2-in-1 Series: Razorback Razorback	Released by Sony BMG Music Entertainment
2006	The 2-in-1 Series: Mojofly Mojofly	Released by Sony BMG Music Entertainment
2006	The 2-in-1 Series: Grace Nono Grace Nono	Released by Sony BMG Music Entertainment
2006	All Seats are Taken The Pin-up Girls	Released by Sutton Records
2006	Eraserheads Anthology Two The Eraserheads	Sony BMG Music Entertainment
2006	Bandang Pinoy, Lasang Hotdog Tribute Album for Hotdog	Sony BMG Music Entertainment

- Others:

Year	Project	Notes
2005–2006	Wall mural for RF Online	Commissioned by Arc Worldwide/RF Online Philippines Situated at the basement level of SM Megamall from November 2005 to May 2006

== Awards ==
- 19th Manila Critics Circle National Book Awards (1999): Winner, Best Comic Book, The Mythology Class
- 20th Manila Critics Circle National Book Awards (2000): Winner, Best Comic Book, Trip to Tagaytay
- 22nd Manila Critics Circle National Book Awards (2002): Finalist, Best Comic Book, After Eden
- 25th Gawad CCP for Alternative Film and Video (2013): 1st Prize Winner, Animation Category, Milkyboy
- 7th Animahenasyon (Philippine Animation Festival) (2013): Best Screenplay, Milkyboy
- 7th Animahenasyon (Philippine Animation Festival) (2013): Special Jury Prize, Andong Agimat: Kanya ang Kalye
- 7th Animahenasyon (Philippine Animation Festival) (2013): Best Music Video, Kaninong Anino
- 30th Los Angeles Asian Pacific Film Festival (2014): Winner, Linda Mabalot New Directors/New Visions Award, Milkyboy

== Exhibits ==
- Mythos (2000)- Crucible Gallery, SM Megamall
- Filipino Art and Artists Exhibition (2001)- Gallery 139, Glorietta 4
- Filipino Art and Artists Exhibition (2001)- San Francisco and New Jersey, USA
- Episode 3 Group Exhibit (2003)- Robinson's Galleria
- ROMIX Italian Comics Festival (2003)- Rome, Italy

== Education ==
- St. Martin Technical Institute, Mandaluyong (1978–79)
- Lourdes School of Mandaluyong, Mandaluyong (1979–80)
- Cainta Catholic School, Cainta, Rizal (1980–89)
- University of the Philippines, Diliman, Quezon City (1989–94)
