= Ipo-ipo =

Hipo-hipo (Tag: "whirlwind" or "tornado") is regarded as the first Filipino superhero. Ipo-ipo was created by Lib Abrena and Oscar del Rosario in April 1947 as a reaction against Japanese military invaders who occupied the Philippines in World War II and refused to surrender even after the admission of defeat by Japan in 1945.

== Publication ==
Hipo-hipo was featured in Magasin ng Pagsilang (literally "Magazine of Birth").

== Superpowers ==
Hipo-hipo derives his superpowers from the whirlwind. His superpowers includes being as fast as the "speed of the wind" and being resistant to bullets that just pass through his body fired upon by guns.

== Movie ==
A 1969 movie, titled Bertong Ipu-Ipo, was made. Stars Roberto Gonzalez.

== See also ==
- Siopawman
- Varga
- Lagim
- Darna
- Captain Barbell
- Voltar
