= Mar Amongo =

Filipino comics artist and illustrator

- Born: October 9, 1936 Santa Cruz, Manila, Commonwealth of the Philippines
- Died: August 10, 2005 (aged 68) Los Baños, Laguna, Philippines
- Area: Artist
- Pseudonym: Jo Amongo

Mar Amongo (October 9, 1936 – August 10, 2005) was a Filipino comics artist and illustrator.

Amongo was born in Santa Cruz, Manila, Philippines. His first stint was with Manlapaz Publishing, where he inked the very first Noli Me Tangere comics novel. After studying with cartoonist Nestor Redondo, he had a fruitful career illustrating "komiks" in his native country.

In 1971, DC Comics Editor-in-Chief Carmine Infantino and editor Joe Orlando traveled to the Philippines on a recruiting trip for artists. Amongo, Alfredo Alcala, Ernie Chan, Alex Niño, Nestor Redondo, and Gerry Talaoc were some of the Filipino artists who went on to work for DC, particularly in the 1970s and 1980s.

From 1983 to 1994, he worked in the Middle East as a traditional illustrator and transitioned to digital arts in later years.

On his return to the Philippines, he was given a comic strip by the Philippines Journal, Inc. to chronicle his ordeals in Kuwait during the Gulf War. It was also during this period that the Philippine government commissioned him to do some murals. First, the "ecosystems mural" which he did for the Department of Environment and Natural Resources, and second, a mural showcasing Filipino heroes, which was digitally reproduced and displayed in strategic areas around Laguna, Philippines, during the Philippine Independence Centennial celebration. He later adapted two of Paul Twitchell's books on Eckankar– The Tiger's Fang and Talons of Time.

Amongo died on August 10, 2005, at age 69, in Los Baños, Laguna, Philippines.
