= Emiliana Kampilan =

Filipino writer and comic book creator

Emiliana Kampilan is the pseudonym of a Filipino writer and comic book creator best known for the critically acclaimed graphic novel Dead Balagtas. She remains anonymous by attending public events with her head covered by a bayong.

Among the most prestigious awards won by Kampilan for Dead Balagtas include Philippines' 37th National Book Awards, given by the National Book Development Board, and the 18th Madrigal-Gonzalez Best First Book Award (MGBFBA), given by the University of the Philippines' Institute of Creative Writing, both in 2018.

== See also ==
- Gerry Alanguilan
