= Cal Sobrepeña =

Filipino comics artist

Felipe Sobrepeña Calusa
- Born: May 1, 1940 (age 86) Pangasinan, Commonwealth of the Philippines
- Awards: Best Komiks Illustrator

Felipe Sobrepeña Calusa (born May 1, 1940) is a Filipino comics artist.
