= Kenkoy =

Philippine comics character

- Kenkoy character
- Kenkoy, the main character of the comic series of the same name.
- First appearance: Liwayway magazine; (January 11, 1929)
- Created by: Tony Velasquez (illustrator); Romualdo Ramos (writer)
- Alias: Francisco Harabas
- Species: Human
- Gender: Male
- Significant other: Rosing (wife)
- Children: Dayunyor Dyulie; Tsing; Doy; Dalisyosa; Etot; Nene; Piching, Tsikiting Gubat
- Nationality: Filipino

Francisco "Kenkoy" Harabas is a Philippine comics character created by writer Romualdo Ramos and cartoonist and illustrator Tony Velasquez in 1929. Velazquez continued the strip for decades after Ramos' death in 1932. Kenkoy was seminal to Philippine comics and thus Velasquez is considered the founding father of the komiks industry. The term kenkoy has entered the Filipino language to mean a joker, jester, or a hilarious person. Kenkoy was a comedic character who wore a baggy pair of pants, suspenders and charol shoes, and had slick, pomaded hair. The modern translation of his Tagalog surname "Harabas" is "reckless". Filipino illustrator and cartoonist Nonoy Marcelo described Kenkoy as a "ludicrous portrait of the Filipino pathetically trying but barely succeeding in keeping up with his American mentors," and as the "Philippine’s first true pop icon." Although with a funny personality, Kenkoy courted Rosing, the Manileña (a woman from Manila) who represented the ideal and romanticized Filipino woman – a female who was timid, shy, kind, caring, prone to jealousy, and impeccable – garbed (like Philippine national hero José Rizal’s Maria Clara) in the traditional baro’t saya or the Sunday camisa (shirt) combined with the panuelo (kerchief), including the bakya (a pair of wooden clogs) footwear. Kenkoy’s competitor for Rosing’s love, affection, and attention was the handsome character named Tirso S. Upot (a wordplay, while "S" in his middle name meant to be "is", then "upot" in Tagalog meaning "uncircumcised", hence “Tirso is Uncircumcised”). Kenkoy eventually won the competition and married Rosing. Kenkoy and Rosing had eight children: their biological children Dayunyor Dyulie, Tsing, Doy, Dalisyosa, Etot, Nene, Piching, and adopted son Tsikiting Gubat, a mute but wily child.

== History ==
Kenkoy's debut appearance on Tagalog-language literary magazine Liwayway (January 11, 1929)

The name Kenkoy was derived from common nicknames for the Francisco, namely Kiko, Iko, Kikoy. Kenkoy first appeared on the pages of the Tagalog-language literary magazine Liwayway on 11 January 1929. Kenkoy had always been portrayed in misadventures. Kenkoy was the lead character for the weekly comic strip Mga Kabalbalan ni Kenkoy (The Misadventures of Kenkoy or Kenkoy’s Antics). Mga Kabalbalan ni Kenkoy was translated into several regional languages in the Philippines.

In the 1960s, Velasquez went with the flow of the fashion trend, shedding Kenkoy’s outmoded clothes. He started wearing pairs of pants similar to those worn by The Beatles, collared sport polo shirt, and Converse brand rubber shoes (sneakers). However, Kenkoy’s trademark polished and flat hairstyle remained. On the other hand, Kenkoy’s wife Rosing maintained her traditional image and demeanor.

== Legacy ==
=== Language ===
Kenkoy, through his creators, was the origin of the “pidgin language” that was the mixture of grammatically-incorrect yet effectively comical “Tagalog, Spanish, and English languages” usage contemporarily known as "Carabao English", ("Kenkoy's English"), “Taglish”, and “Spangalog” (a portmanteau, creole of Tagalog and Spanish, not the Chavacano of Cavite).

=== Music ===
Filipino musician and composer wrote a libretto about Kenkoy entitled Hay Naku Kenkoy ("Oh My Gosh Kenkoy"). Filipino folk rocker Mike Hanopol wrote the song entitled Mr. Kenkoy.

=== Film adaptation ===
A film version of Kenkoy was created in 1951, directed by Ramon Estrella and featured Filipino actors such as Dely Atay-atayan, Eduardo Infante, and Lopito. At one point in 1946, Velasquez said in an interview that he was paid to write a script for an animated feature film based on his famous character, but the project was abandoned and later shifted to a live-action.

== Collected editions ==
Title	Material collected
Miss Barbecue	Kenkoy Komiks #18 (September 14, 1959)
Ang Kasaysayan ni Isaac at ni Jacob	Kenkoy Komiks #18 (September 14, 1959)
Payasong Itim	Kenkoy Komiks #21 (October 26, 1959)
Markado	Kenkoy Komiks #24 (December 7, 1959)

== See also ==
- Filipino cartoon and animation
