= The Mythology Class =

- 2014 edition cover as published by Nautilus Comics
- Author: Arnold Arre
- Language: English
- Subject: Philippine mythology
- Genre: Fantasy
- Published: Arnold Arre (1999); Adarna House (2005); Nautilus Comics (2014)
- Publication date: 1999
- Publication place: Philippines
- Media type: Print
- Pages: 364
- ISBN: 978-621-95109-2-9

The Mythology Class is a Philippine graphic novel written and illustrated by Arnold Arre. It was originally published by Arre in four issues in 1999, and was collected into a special edition by Adarna House in September 2005. The latest edition is a reprint of the special collected edition, published in November 2014 by Nautilus Comics.

The original series won a Manila Critics Circle National Book Award on September 11, 2000, and is the first to win in the Comic Books category.

In November 2018, Arnold Arre announced he was making a direct sequel to The Mythology Class titled, The Children of Bathala. The first volume was released a year later on its 20th anniversary.

== Synopsis ==
Summoned to a secret gathering one stormy night by the mysterious Mrs. Enkanta, University of the Philippines anthropology student Nicole Lacson finds herself face to face with tikbalangs, kapres, and all sorts of engkantos—Philippine mythical creatures—she had only heard about from her grandfather's stories. Together with newfound friends, she embarks on a quest into the realm of myth and folklore where she fights alongside heroes of her childhood against an age-old terror. Follow in their footsteps as their adventure takes them through the familiar streets of Metro Manila and into a world more fascinating than they had ever imagined.

The story also invokes historical and mythological Filipino heroes like Sulayman and Lam-ang.

== Plot ==
A group of students desperate for their thesis, including Nicole whose thesis was rejected, was summoned by a mysterious Mrs. Enkanta to solve a mysterious and horrible truth on myths.

== Citation by the Manila Critics Circle ==
"This four-issue series is a landmark in itself: a comic book that combines Filipino myths and legends with modern humor, action and sensibility. The result is a quirky, enjoyable comic book series that is thoroughly modern and Filipino in its approach. Through his distinctive art and story, Arre imbues his young warriors with a spunk, spark, and whimsy that resonate with any reader. In The Mythology Class, Arre gives us a glimpse of all that a truly Filipino comic book, drawing on all our multifarious influences, can become, all with a confident and unique style all his own."

== Potential film adaptation ==
In October 2015, Jerrold Tarog announced that he would direct a film adaptation of The Mythology Class, and Jade Castro came on board as his co-writer. The project was given the green-light after Tarog successfully pitched the idea to the producers of Heneral Luna, a film he directed the same year. He envisions the film as being divided into two cinematic parts. Tarog himself has praised the graphic novel, saying it "remains potent and exhilarating" since its first publication, and complimented Arre as someone whose "imagination and creativity soar to dizzying heights". Owing to its success, he hired Arre and his wife to design the poster for his film Senior Year (2010). In December 2016, Tarog told Esquire's Philippine edition that the project was still under way, reiterating that he and Castro had been working on the screenplay.

== See also ==
- Trip to Tagaytay
- After Eden
