= Jim Fernandez =

Filipino comic artist (1936–2022)

Jim M. Fernandez (February 21, 1936 – June 13, 2022) was a Filipino comic book artist best known for his works on Aztec and Aliwan Komiks. He also popularized the fictional character, Zuma in his novels. Apart from being an editor, illustrator, cartoonist, and writer for Philippine comics, Fernandez was also a certified public accountant in the Philippines.

== Early career ==
During college, Fernandez was the editor of The Commerce Journal, The English Journal, and The UST Commerce Silver Jubilee Book.

== Influences ==
As an illustrator, Fernandez was influenced by the Tarzan character by Edgar Rice Burroughs. In 1953, he was mentored by Tony S. Velasquez, a Filipino illustrator for the Velasquez Advertising Agency.

== Career ==
Fernandez started his formal career as an illustrator by accepting the project to create drawings for the short story Batas ni Sumakwel published by Marte Publications. After this first assignment, Fernandez illustrated for Mabuhay Komiks and Extra Komiks. Afterwards, he illustrated for Gemiliano Pineda's novel Mga Haragan; Mars Ravelo's Mariposa, Dalaginding na si Tessie ("Tessie is Now a Young Woman"), Darna at ang Impakta, Darna at ang Babaing Tuod, Captain Barbel, Haydee, Elepanta, and Flash Bomba; Rico Bello Omagap's Ang Nobya Kong Igorota ("My Igorot Girlfriend"); Tony Tenorio's Sor Matilde; and Tony Velasquez's Lupang Ginto ("Gold Land"), Ulilang Christmas Tree ("Orphaned Christmas Tree"), and Ang Mahal Kong Bungal ("My Incomplete-Toothed Loved One").

=== 1960s ===
In 1963, Fernandez became the co-founder of CRAF Publications, the publisher of Redondo Komix and Alcala Fight Komix. During the same year, Fernandez established the Real Publications, the publisher of Bolniks Komiks and Lindelmel Komiks. In 1965, Fernandez went back to the Roces Publications, the publisher of Pilipino Komiks, Hiwaga Komiks, Espesyal Komiks, and Tagalog Klasiks. In 1966, he illustrated Mars Ravelo's Tiny Tony.

In 1967, Fernandez studied at the Famous Artist School. It was during this period when Fernandez's black-and-white rendition of Darna at ang Impakta was given an "A-rating" by B.Th. Closset, together with the comment "very good handling of pen and ink". Also in 1967, Fernandez created the cartoon Feathers for the Manila Times newspaper.

=== 1970s ===
During the end of the 1970s, Fernandez started writing and illustrating his own novels. His first novel was The Fighting Priest in Hiwaga Komiks. His other novels were Farida, The Dormitory, The Grandmaster, Nunal sa Balikat ("Mole on the Shoulders"), and Starex. In 1973, Fernandez focused more on writing instead of drawing. Fernandez's novels Halik sa Hangin ("Kiss in the Wind") and Titang were illustrated by Hal Santiago; his The Astronaut and Mission: Jupiter were drawn by Mar. T. Santana; his Aztec was illustrated by Elmer Esquivias.

After working for Atlas Publications, Fernandez started illustrating for Graphic Arts Service, Inc. (GASI) in March 1976, where his novels Anak ni Zuma (Aliwan Komiks), The Gorgon, Astrobal, The Cannibal, Jeric-the Boy from Mars, Polaris, Virga, Borbo, and Angkan ni Zuma ("Clan of Zuma") appeared in print. Fernandez also authored the novels Kambal sa Uma (Kislap Magazine), Anak ni Kro (Affiliated Publications), Karpetina (Affiliated Publications), and Mulawina (Affiliated Publications), Uso pa ba ang Birhen (Liwayway), Tiza (Liwayway), Touchdown (Liwayway), and Anak ni Touchdown ("Touchdown's Child") (Liwayway), and Nazka (Rex Publications).

== Adaptations ==
A number of Fernandez's novels were adapted into film. Among them were his Nunal sa Balikat, Farida, The Dormitory, Life Everlasting, Kingpin, Brutus, Kambal sa Uma, and Anak ni Zuma. Fernandez received the amount of 100,000 pesos for Anak ni Zuma when it was adapted for the cinemas. In 2009, the successful remake of Jim Fernandez' Kambal Sa Uma starring Shaina Magdayao and Melissa Ricks and the original actress who played both roles Multi-Awarded Actress Rio Locsin who played the twins in the film adaptation Locsin also gave pointers to both actresses on the role she similarly portrayed 30 years ago.

== Awards ==
In college, Fernandez won the gold medal during a student's debate competition at the University of Santo Tomas. Fernandez's illustrations for Mars Ravelo's Darna at ang Impakta garnered him the Award for Excellence in Illustration from the Society of Philippine Illustrators and Cartoonists (SPIC).

== Family ==
Fernandez's brother, Rolando Fernandez, is his assistant illustrator.
