= Trip to Tagaytay =

Graphic novel set in futuristic Philippines

Trip to Tagaytay is a graphic novel written and illustrated by Filipino comic creator Arnold Arre. It was published by the author under his own Tala Comics Publishing in 2001, and subsequently won a Manila Critics Circle National Book Award in September 2002.

Trip to Tagaytay is a 44-page short story in comics form, set in a future Philippines replete with flying cars and multimedia wrist-devices. In this vision of the future, popular actor Aga Muhlach is the aging President, the Eraserheads are on a Reunion Tour that spans the stars, and Philippine Spacelines is offering a 50% discount on Moon Travel. We follow the musings of a young man as he journeys through the city, headed for the Grand Liwayway Station, where he plans to take the cheapest train out, since they just opened the Tagaytay Ocean Tunnel connecting to Cebu. All the while, he is composing a missive addressed to his love, who is living on a faraway Orbital Space Station.

== Synopsis by the Manila Critics Circle ==
In this futuristic story, popular actor Aga Muhlach is the aging President, the Eraserheads are on a Reunion Tour that spans the stars, and Philippine Space Lines is offering a 50 percent discount on Moon Travel. A young man journeys through the city, heading for the Grand Liwayway Station where he plans to take the cheapest train out, since they just opened the Tagaytay Ocean Tunnel connecting to Cebu. All the while, he is composing a message addressed to his love who is far away in Orbital Space Station.

== Plot ==
The young man, ready for traveling, ponders upon futuristic Philippines, where Aga Muhlach was the President, Eraserheads will have a concert on the Moon and PSL offering a discount to travel to the Moon. He wrote his experience before he arrives in Grand Liwayway Station. He experienced everything as he goes towards his dream: to go to "Tagaytay", his place of dreams. He ends the letter and looks at the hologram of his love, who is in Orbital Space Station and works as a personnel, which switches back from her OSS uniform to a Filipiniana clothes, and stands up to prepare himself to ride the arriving train.

== See also ==
- Arnold Arre
- After Eden
- The Mythology Class
- Halina Filipina
