= Fred Carrillo =

Filipino comics artist

- Born: Wilfredo Limbana Carrillo; 1926 Kalibo, Aklan, Insular Government of the Philippine Islands
- Died: August 2005 (aged 78–79) Manila, Philippines
- Notable works: Phantom Stranger

Wilfredo Limbana "Fred" Carrillo (1926–August 2005) was a Filipino comics artist.

== Biography ==
Fred Carrillo was born in Kalibo, Aklan, Philippines. He began his career drawing propaganda material for the guerrilla movement in Panay during World War II. After the war, he began his career as a professional artist. Carrillo studied fine arts and architecture at the University of Santo Tomas.

He worked for DC Comics in the 1970s and 1980s. He drew mystery titles such as Ghosts, Phantom Stranger, Secrets of Haunted House, The Unexpected, Weird War Tales, and The Witching Hour. After leaving the comics industry, he worked on various animation projects. Some of the television series with which he was involved include He-Man and the Masters of the Universe, The Transformers, and Bionic Six. Carrillo died in August 2005.

== Bibliography ==
=== Charlton Comics ===
- Tales of the Mysterious Traveler #14 (1985)

=== DC Comics ===
- Action Comics Weekly #617, 631–634 (1988–1989)
- DC Special Series #4 (1977)
- Ghosts #23, 32, 36–37, 41–42, 49, 57–58, 64–66, 79, 85, 87, 99–100, 105–106, 109 (1974–1982)
- G.I. Combat #188–189, 193, 196, 202–203, 210–211, 213, 215, 217, 220, 226, 236, 274, 276, 281 (1976–1986)
- House of Mystery #215, 265, 289, 296–297, 305 (1973–1982)
- House of Secrets #110, 145 (1973–1977)
- Phantom Stranger vol. 2 #38–41 (1975–1976)
- The Saga of the Swamp Thing #7–13 (Phantom Stranger backup stories) (1982–1983)
- Secrets of Haunted House #15, 23–24, 28, 33, 35, 44, 46 (1979–1982)
- Star Spangled War Stories #189 (1975)
- Swamp Thing #24 (1976)
- Time Warp #4–5 (1980)
- The Unexpected #138, 141, 159, 163, 173–174, 181, 185–186, 189, 191–192, 217 (1972–1981)
- Unknown Soldier #219–221, 226–228 (1978–1979)
- Weird Mystery Tales #20, 23 (1975)
- Weird War Tales #40, 58, 65, 90, 94–95, 97, 102, 104–105, 107, 113–121, 123–124 (1975–1983)
- The Witching Hour #48, 50–51, 56, 58, 62–63, 66, 68, 74–75, 80, 83–85 (1974–1978)

=== Gold Key Comics ===
- The Twilight Zone #65 (1975)

=== Marvel Comics ===
- Impossible Man #2 (1991)
- In His Steps SC (1994)
- Savage Sword of Conan #170–171, 173, 182 (1990–1991)

=== Pendulum Press ===
- The Last of the Mohicans #1 (1977)
- White Fang #1 (1977)

=== Topps Comics ===
- Jurassic Park: Raptor #2 (1993)

=== Warren Publishing ===
- Creepy #116, 122, 126–131, 133–136, 138, 140–141 (1980–1982)
- Eerie #138 (1983)

Preceded by Gerry Talaoc	Phantom Stranger vol. 2 artist 1975–1976	Succeeded by n/a
Preceded by Nestor Redondo	Swamp Thing artist 1976	Succeeded by n/a
