= Varga (comics) =

- Upon a shout and a touch, the violet-colored ghost Vara unites with the human child Olga, fused into one person in a single body: the superhero Varga (Vara + Olga).

Publication information
- Publisher: Bulaklak Magazine
- First appearance: 1947
- Created by: Mars Ravelo

In-story information
- Alter ego: Darna; Princess Vara; Olga
- Species: Varan
- Place of origin: Planet Vargon; Earth
- Abilities: Flight; Super strength; Super reflexes; Super speed; Unlimited stamina; Skilled in hand-to-hand combat; Ultra-enhanced senses; Psionic abilities

Varga (real name: Narda), a Filipino comic superheroine, was created by Marcial "Mars" Ravelo and first appeared in Bulaklak Magazine in 1947. The character, originally named Varga and later known as Darna, is an alien princess from Planet Vergon. She possesses superhero abilities like flight, super strength, and psionic skills. Varga, recognized as the first female superhero in the Philippines, has been featured in various media, including films, TV shows, and comic books.

== Publication history ==
Mars Ravelo created the character Varga in 1939, which debuted in Bulaklak Magazine in 1947 and later became popular as "Darna". Before this success, Ravelo faced challenges in getting Varga published, initially proposing the character to Liwayway Magazine and experiencing several rejections. The character went through periods of archival before eventually gaining widespread recognition.

Varga's design was partly influenced by American Superman comics, brought to the Philippines by U.S. soldiers. In Ravelo's initial concept, Narda, a mortal girl living in Masambong with her brother Ding and grandmother Lola Asay, transforms into the superhero Varga when a falling star, revealed as a magical amulet, bestows powers upon her. This early narrative forms the basis for Varga's character, where the central theme revolves around Narda's transformation into a superhero through a mystical object.

After a long absence, the character resurfaced in the 2008 TV series Komiks Presents: Varga.

== Costume ==
The original costume of Varga, as featured in the series, includes a long-sleeved shirt adorned with three stars representing the Philippine flag, accompanied by shorts and a belt with a Bahag, a traditional loincloth.

In the 2008 TV adaptation, Varga's costume is updated to a purple romper, complemented by a cape and boots, both accented with gold details. Additionally, her ensemble includes accessories such as a golden headpiece marked with a "V" sign and a golden medallion belt.

== In other media ==
Komiks Presents: Varga, a 2008 television series featuring Mariel Rodriguez, introduces Princess Vara, an alien from Planet Vargon. After the destruction of Vargon, Vara finds refuge on Earth but remains in an intangible ghost form. She encounters Olga, a young human girl with a compassionate heart, who becomes her ally. Their unique bond allows Olga to see Vara, otherwise invisible to humans.

In the series, Vara, initially a violet-colored ghost, merges with Olga through a specific ritual involving a shout and touch. This transformation results in Varga, a singular superhero entity. The narrative centers on their joint efforts to combat Earth's adversaries, notably Xandra, an antagonist who preys on others for youth and beauty. The story follows Varga's journey in confronting these threats, emphasizing themes of unity, courage, and the battle between good and evil.

== Collected editions ==
Title	Volume	Issue	Date
Varga	Bulaklak Magazine Vol. 4	#1	(1947–1948)
Varga	Bulaklak Magazine	#17	July 23, 1947
Varga	Bulaklak Magazine p. 54	#43	May 12, 1948

== See also ==
- Darna
- Captain Barbell
- Isang Lakas
- Siopawman
- Ipo-ipo
- Lagim
- Voltar
- List of Filipino superheroes
