= Federico C. Javinal =

Federico C. Javinal is considered one of the “great achievers in Philippine Art”, particularly in the field of Philippine comics.

== Biography ==
Javinal started working for Bulaklak Komiks in 1955. He became an assistant illustrator for Francisco V. Coching beginning 1956 through 1973. As partners in the comics industry, Javinal and Coching created Salabusab, Pedro Penduko, El Vibora, and Dimasalang, among others. He later illustrated for Liwayway Magazine, particularly the novels written by Amada Yasanas such as Anak ng Tulisan (Child of the Pirate), Tom Cat, Kamaong Asero (Fist of Steel), Antigo (Antique), and Kahariang Bato (Stone Kingdom). Upon moving to the Graphic Arts Service, Inc., Javinal did the artwork for Alakdang Bato (Stone Scorpion). He later agreed to make illustrations for Tony Velasquez’s Mga Kwento ni Kenkoy. During the budding career of Javinal, Velasquez previously rejected Javinal's artwork submissions while Velasquez was still the editor of Ace Publications.
