= Kulafu =

Publication information
- Created by: Francisco Reyes; Pedrito Reyes

In-story information
- Alter ego: Pido

Kulafu is a fictional character created on July 7, 1933, by Filipino illustrator Francisco Reyes and Filipino writer Pedrito Reyes, described as one of the earliest comic book heroes in the Philippines. Kulafu appeared on the first colored adventure strip and the first two-page comic strip in the Philippines, under the same title.

== Plot ==
The storyline about Kulafu was influenced by Tarzan, a character created by Edgar Rice Burroughs. The story of Kulafu started when a toddler named "Pido" was snatched by a gigantic bird called "Ibong Malta" from his human mother while she was doing the laundry at a nearby river. Pido was brought to the Ibong Malta's nest to become the meal of the bird and her mate. The male Ibong Malta became impatient and tried to devour Pido right away which resulted in a fight between the two birds. Pido was accidentally hit by the wing of one of the birds and fell from the nest. As he fell, the child grabbed hold of one of the eggs of the Ibong Malta. Pido fell on the branches of a big tree which cushioned his fall. Pido was retrieved by a band of white apes who planned to have him as their meal. However, a female ape intervened and saved Pido. Eventually, the egg of the Ibong Malta that Pido had grabbed hatched. Pido considered the bird his brother and it became his constant companion ever since. When the bird grew to adulthood, it provided Pido with air transportation.

Kulafu's name was given by a civilized man named Magat, whom Pido saved from being devoured by a shark. Magat had witnessed a conversation between Guna (Pido's pet monkey) and Pido's Ibong Malta. Guna uttered the sound "kula" repeatedly, while the Ibong Malta repeatedly answered with the sound "fu". Because of the combined sounds, Magat came to the conclusion that Pido's name was "Kulafu".

Kulafu was raised by the ape who saved him. He grew up in the jungles of Southern Philippines during the pre-Spanish era. Kulafu’s adventures included battling mythical creatures such as dragons and mermen (known as siyokoy in Tagalog), among others.

Kulafu's garment was made from the skin of a tiger. Though the tiger is not indigenous to the Philippines, the story accounted for this by explaining that the sultan of Borneo had given a tiger as a gift to the sultan of the island where Kulafu dwells. The tiger escaped and was killed by Kulafu in an encounter. Kulafu's friend Magat then helped him create a garment from the tiger's pelt.

== Sequel ==
A sequel to the original Kulafu series was Anak ni Kulafu (Child of Kulafu), created by Francisco Reyes.

== Adaptation ==
On May 7, 1963, a second komiks magazine named Kulafu Komiks was published by Veritas Publishing Co., Inc. The magazine was based on the original Kulafu comic book hero created by the Reyeses.

=== Tadhana ===
Kulafu's character was adapted as a protagonist in the 1978 adult animated film Tadhana, the first Philippine animated feature.

== Translation ==
As one of the most popular heroes and comic strips in the Philippines, Kulafu was translated into other Philippine languages such as Bisaya, Bikolano (Bikolnon), and Ilokano. It had also been translated into Spanish for a magazine in South America.

== Vino Kulafu ==
Due to the popularity of the Kulafu character in the Philippines, La Tondeña, Inc. (now Ginebra San Miguel, Inc.) purchased the rights to use the Kulafu name in 1957 for its new brand of Chinese medicinal wine, Vino Kulafu (meaning "Kulafu Wine").

== See also ==
- Hagibis
