= Cris CaGuintuan =

Cris CaGuintuan is one of the pioneers of the komiks industry in the Philippines. As a comic book artist and illustrator, he was one of the creators of the first costumed Filipino superheroes, namely Lagim, which appeared in Pilipino Komiks. CaGuintuan created other comic book stories during the early years of the comic book industry in the Philippines.
