= Zuma (comics) =

Publication information
- Publisher: Graphics Arts Service Inc.
- First appearance: Aztec (1974)
- Created by: Jim Fernandez (character & story); Ben Maniclang (illustration)

In-story information
- Species: Demigod
- Place of origin: Central and South America
- Notable aliases: King of the Snakes
- Abilities: Ability to command snakes; Two-headed snake on his shoulders with a powerful bite; Invulnerability (specifically bullet-proof)

Zuma is a Filipino comic book character created by Jim Fernandez in 1974. The character first appeared in a serial written by Fernandez entitled Aztec. From 1976 to 1985, Zuma got his own series named Anak ni Zuma that was serialized in Aliwan Komiks published by Graphics Arts Service Inc. with illustration by Ben Maniclang. The comics series was the biggest best seller for Aliwan. Following this publication success, spin-offs and a 1990s reboot about the character were published and it was further expanded in other media including film and television.

== Publication history ==
In 1974, Filipino comics book artist Jim Fernandez created Zuma, which first appeared in the comics serial Aztec. After two years, in 1976, Fernandez wrote a new series for the character entitled Anak ni Zuma that was serialized in Aliwan Komiks published by Graphics Arts Service Inc. (GASI) with illustration by Ben Maniclang. The series ran in syndication until 1985 that became Aliwan's biggest bestseller.

Due to its publication success, the comics serial branched out to a prequel spin-off entitled Angkan ni Zuma, which tells the story of Zuma during the ancient period. This prequel was written again by Fernandez and illustrated by Mar T. Santana; and ran from 1978 to 1983. A science fiction comics entitled Zuma-Maria was another spin-off that divulges on the future descendant of Zuma. Dugong Aztec was also a spin-off that was simultaneously published with the main comics serial. It was published in Rex Komiks by Rex Publications Inc. from 1978 to 1979 and it was still written by Fernandez with illustration by Elmer Esquivas.

There was also a comics reboot in the 1990s published under the short-lived magazine entitled Zuma Komiks by GASI. The stories in this comics magazine that was also known by other two names (Zuma and Other Amazing Stories and Zuma and Other Horror Stories) were written by various writers with illustration by Clem V. Rivera in its early run and then by Vic Catan Jr in later issues. The comics magazine is an anthology of horror.

== Character background ==
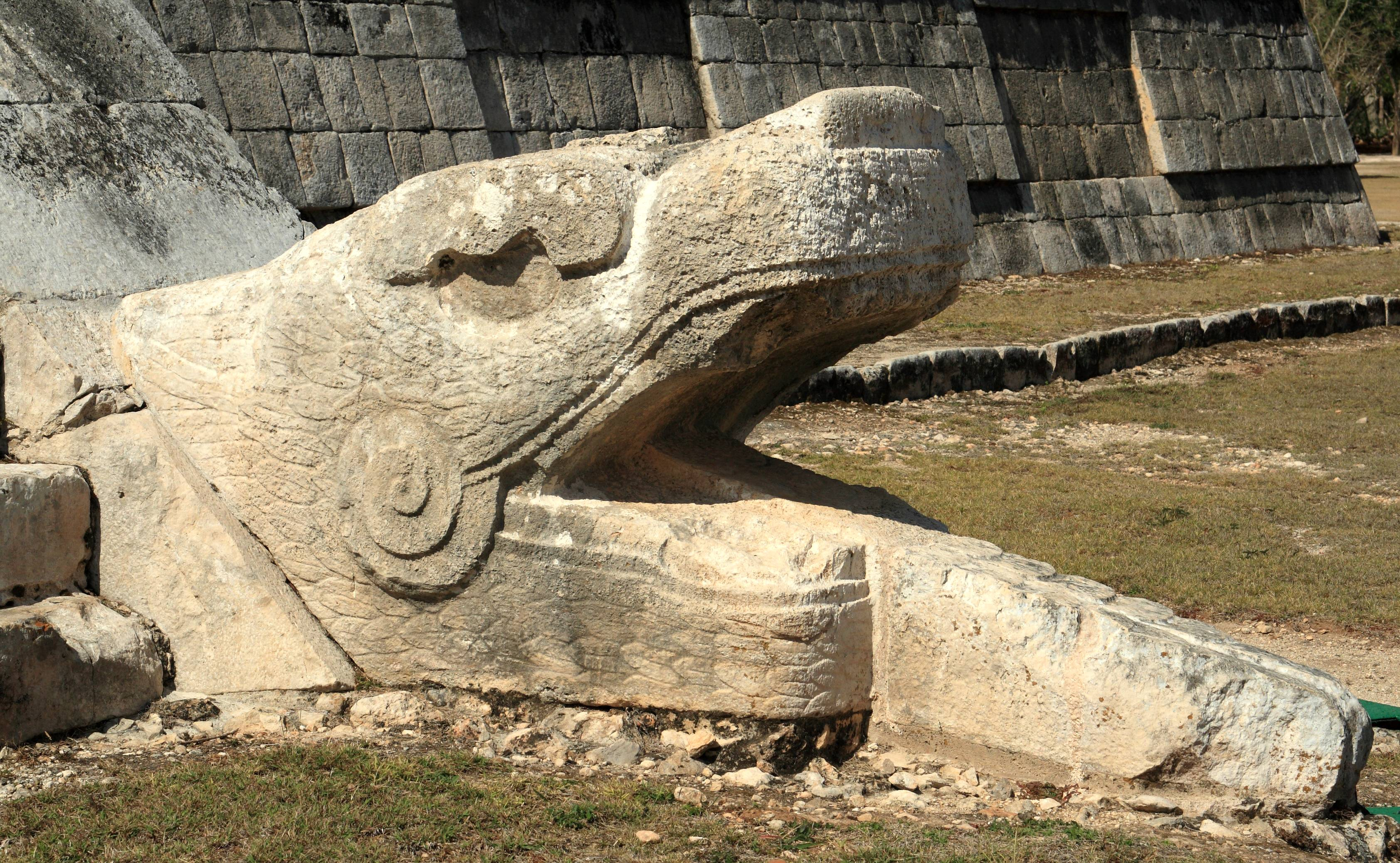
A statue of the Mesoamerican serpent deity Kukulkan at El Castillo, Chichen Itza. Kukulkan is depicted as the father of Zuma in the comics story line.

The most noticeable physical characteristic of Zuma is the two-headed snake that protrude from his shoulders resting like a lei and he uses them to defeat his enemies as they have a powerful bite that has an ability to decapitate. In addition, he has green skin and bald hair similar to Martian Manhunter, another comics character. Although, his face is human-like with a demonic appearance. He is often depicted as a villain or an anti-hero instead of a superhero.

According to Zuma's story in the comics and other media, he is the son of the Aztec serpent god Kukulkan, making him a demigod. He had been in hibernation for a long time until his tomb in an Aztec pyramid was unearthed by an archaeological expedition team that awakened him. After his revival, he goes to the modern world in a killing rage, slaughtering particularly virgin women, whose hearts are ripped out and consumed that give Zuma his strength and vigor.

Aside from using his two-headed snake as a weapon, Zuma's power includes invulnerability (specifically bullet-proof) and controlling snakes. In later versions, Zuma has the ability to heal people. His weakness is the venom from his daughter Galema who is also his archenemy. Galema's mother is a human that Zuma has taken as his bride. Although, Galema grew with foster parents that made her to be a good person. Zuma also beget another child named Dino who has a head of a dinosaur and a body of a human. Dino initially allied with his father but he later abandoned him because Dino fell in love with a human.

== In other media ==
=== Film ===
Zuma have been adapted into two films. The first one was from a 1985 film by Cine Suerte Inc. entitled Zuma, with Max Laurel portraying the title role and Snooky Serna playing Zuma's daughter, Galema. This film that was directed by Jun Raquiza is also known as Jim Fernandez's Zuma.

The second Zuma film is a sequel entitled Anak ni Zuma, which also known alternatively as Zuma II: Hell Serpent. Max Laurel reprised his role as Zuma while the role of Galema got a recast and was played by Jenny Lyn. It was released again by Cine Suerte Inc. in 1987 and was directed by Ben Yalung.

=== Television ===
Zuma appeared in the 2013 television series Galema: Anak ni Zuma. Derick Hubalde, son of Filipino basketball player Freddie Hubalde and brother of Paolo Hubalde, played Zuma while Andi Eigenmann portrayed Galema. The television series is broadcast in ABS-CBN and the story focuses more on the hardship of Galema as she lives her cursed life that was passed down from her father, Zuma.

== See also ==
- Panday (comics)
- List of fictional demons
- Kukulkan
