= Tony Velasquez =

Filipino illustrator (1910–1997)

- Born: October 29, 1910 Ulilang Kawayan, Paco, Manila, Philippine Islands
- Died: 1997 (aged 86–87)
- Notable works: Kenkoy
- Collaborators: Romualdo Ramos

Antonio "Tony" Velasquez (29 October 1910 – 1997) was a Filipino illustrator regarded as the Father of Tagalog comics and as the pioneer and founding father of the Philippine comics industry. He was the co-creator of Kenkoy, an “iconic Philippine comic strip character”.

== Biography ==
=== Family background ===
Velasquez was born in Ulilang Kawayan, Paco, Manila. He was the sixth child of a Pangasinense father, Eusebio Velasquez, and a Caviteña mother, Andrea Santos.

=== Education ===
Velasquez studied at the Jose Rizal College. In 1934, he also completed a correspondence course on illustration and drawing from the International Correspondence School.

=== Early career ===
While a student at Jose Rizal College, Velasquez worked as a part-time illustrator for Banaag Press, a publishing company which later became known as Acme Printing in 1927 after being acquired by Ramon Roces, a Filipino-Spanish businessman and publisher. In 1928, Velasquez – together with script writer Romualdo Ramos – created Kenkoy, a “Filipino comic star” character that first appeared in the Tagalog-language Liwayway magazine on 11 January 1929. In 1932, he also created the female equivalent of Kenkoy, Ponyang Halobaybay, a typical portrait of the Filipina woman in American-era Philippines. Other cartoon characters soon followed like Nanong Pandak, Talakitok, Talimusak, and Tinyente Dikyam.

=== At Roces Publications ===
In 1935, Velasquez became chief advertising artist for the Ramon Roces Publications, Inc. As chief advertising artist, Velasquez designed labels for Philippine products such as Tiki-Tiki Vitamins, Castor Oil, and Cortal, among others. Along with such product label designs, Velasquez created cartoon characters that accompanied the advertisements for the products. The characters Velasquez created included Captain Cortal for Cortal, Nars Cafi for Cafi Aspirina, and Isko for Esco Shoes, among others.

=== During World War II ===
During the Japanese Occupation of the Philippines in World War II, Velasquez was forced to use his Kenkoy character as war propaganda to influence the Filipinos. Refusing at first, then Philippine President Jose P. Laurel was able to convince Velasquez to concede and use Kenkoy as a promotional tool for Laurel’s health programs instead of as war propaganda.

=== Ace Publications ===
In 1947, Velasquez retired from Liwayway magazine to create the publishing firm Ace Publication, a mass producer of Philippine comic books. Through Ace Publication, Velasquez was able to produce “some of the best” and “most popular” Philippine comic books, such as Pilipino Komiks (1947), Tagalog Klasiks (1949), Hiwaga Komiks (1950), Espesyal Komiks (1952), Kenkoy Komiks (1959), and Educational Klasiks Komiks (1961).

=== At GASI Publications ===
In 1962, Velasquez had to close Ace Publication due a labor dispute. Afterwards, Velasquez established the Graphic Arts Service, Inc. (also known as GASI Publications). Through GASI Publications, Velasquez was able to produce Philippine comic books such as Pinoy Komiks, Pinoy Klasiks, Aliwan Komiks, Holiday Komiks, Teens Weekly Komiks, and Pioneer Komiks.

=== Death ===
Velasquez died in 1997 at the age of 86 .

== Influence ==
Velasquez was the mentor to other Filipino illustrators, namely Francisco Coching (who later became a National Artist for Visual Arts in 2014), Mars Ravelo, Jose Zabala-Santos, and J. M. Perez, among others.
