= Alfredo Alcala =

Filipino comic book artist (1925-2000)

- Alcala in 1977
- Born: Alfredo P. Alcala; August 23, 1925 Talisay, Negros Occidental, Philippine Islands
- Died: April 8, 2000 (aged 74) Los Angeles, California, U.S.
- Areas: Penciller, Inker
- Notable works: Ukala; Voltar; Savage Sword of Conan; Swamp Thing
- Awards: Inkpot Award, 1977; Inkwell Awards Stacey Aragon Special Recognition Award (SASRA) (2021)
- Children: 2

Alfredo P. Alcala (August 23, 1925 – April 8, 2000) was a Filipino comics artist, born in Talisay, Negros Occidental, in the Philippines. Alcala was an established illustrator whose works appeared in the Alcala Komix Magazine. His 1963 creation Voltar introduced him to an international audience, particularly in the United States. Alcala garnered awards in science fiction during the early part of the 1970s.

== Biography ==
Alfredo Alcala's lifelong interest in comic books began in childhood. He dropped out of school in his early teens to pursue a career in art, initially as a sign painter and commercial artist. Subsequently he took employment in an ironworker's shop, designing lamps and household furniture, as well as a church pulpit. During the Japanese occupation of the Philippines in World War II he drew revealing pictures of their gear and position for the American forces.

Inspired by the work of Lou Fine and other cartoonists, Alcala commenced his comic book career in October 1948, beginning with an illustration in Bituin Komiks (Star Comics). By the end of the year he was drawing for Ace Publications, the Philippines' largest publishing company. Ace was the publisher of four titles (Filipino Komiks, Tagalog Klassiks, Espesial Komiks, and Hiwaga Komiks), each featuring his work. Ukala (1950) was one of his first major comics.

Though his career rapidly expanded, Alcala never used assistants to complete his work. He said, "I somehow felt that the minute you let someone else have a hand in your work no matter what, it's not you anymore. It's like riding a bicycle built for two."

He eventually became a star of the Filipino comics scene, so famed that a periodical bore his name, the Alcala Komiks Magasin. In 1963 he created the comic book Voltar whose titular character predated Frazetta's interpretation of Conan the Barbarian which bore a more than passing resemblance. Voltar became an award-winning success at home and abroad. Alcala's mature artistic style reflected his interest in the woodcuts and etchings of Renaissance master Albrecht Dürer and the drawings of Australian illustrator Walter Jardine and U.S. illustrator Franklin Booth which bore the look of engravings. He has also cited the work of British artist Frank Brangwyn as a major influence.

Fellow cartoonist Tony DeZuniga was the first Filipino artist to relocate to the United States to work for DC Comics in 1970, followed by Nestor Redondo and Gerry Talaoc. In 1971 Alcala began a decade of work for both DC and Marvel Comics on horror and fantasy titles, eventually moving to New York City in 1976. He was one of the artists on the licensed movie tie-in series Planet of the Apes and also helped recruit up-and-coming Filipino artists such as Alex Niño to U.S. publishers. In 1975, Alcala and writer Jack Oleck created Kong the Untamed for DC Comics. Later that year, Alcala drew Marvel Treasury of Oz, a comics adaptation of The Marvelous Land of Oz. Alcala joined Warren Publishing in 1977 and drew 39 stories for that publisher from 1977 to 1981. His series Voltar was reprinted in issues #2–9 of The Rook. In the early 1980s he penciled the Star Wars newspaper strip. In 1983 he teamed with the penciller Jack Kirby on Destroyer Duck from Eclipse Comics and around that same time he also inked comic books such as Conan the Barbarian over John Buscema's pencils and inked Don Newton's pencil artwork in Batman.

With the failure of DC's and Warren's horror titles in the 1980s, many of the Filipino contributors turned to the field of animation in California, and in the 1990s Alcala followed suit. He also illustrated the novel Daddy Cool written by Donald Goines. His last work in comics was for Paradox Press' The Big Book of Thugs in 1996.

On April 8, 2000, Alcala died from cancer in Southern California. He is survived by his wife Lita and two sons, Christian Voltar and Alfred Jr.

== Awards ==
Alcala received an Inkpot Award in 1977. In 2021, he was awarded the Inkwell Awards Stacey Aragon Special Recognition Award (SASRA) (2021).

== Selected bibliography ==
Comics work (interior pencil art, except where noted) includes:

=== DC Comics ===
- All-Star Squadron (inks over other artists pencils) #52, 54, 57 (1985–86)
- America vs. the Justice Society (inks) #1–4 (1985)
- Arak, Son of Thunder (full art): #13–15; (inks): #10–12, 16–25, Annual #1 (1981–84)
- Batman (inks) #349, 354–355, 357, 362–381, 383, 385, Annual #10 (1982–1986)
- DC Comics Presents (inks) #48 (1982)
- Detective Comics (inks) #520, 526, 531, 534, 543–544, 576–577 (1982–87)
- Forbidden Tales of Dark Mansion #10–11, 13 (1973)
- Ghosts #9, 15, 17–19, 21, 24–25, 28, 33–34, 52 (1972–77)
- Hellblazer (inks) #8–9, 18–22 (1988–89)
- House of Mystery #209, 217, 219–220, 222, 224–228, 251–252, 254, 256 (1972–78)
- House of Secrets #100, 104–107, 109, 115, 117, 119–120, 122, 125 (1972–74)
- Infinity, Inc. (inks) #10, 43, Annual #1 (1985–87)
- Kamandi (inks) #47, 49–50 (1976–77)
- Kong the Untamed #1–3 (1975)
- Masters of the Universe (inks) #1–2 (1982–83)
- Our Army at War #251 (1972)
- Plop! #1–3 (1973–74)
- Secrets of Sinister House #6, 10, 12–14 (1972–73)
- The Shadow Annual (inks) #1 (inks) (1987)
- Shadow War of Hawkman (inks) #1–4 (miniseries, 1985)
- Swamp Thing vol. 2 (inks) #30, 41, 45, 49, 51–52, 54–59, 61–85, 90–93, 95–101 (1984–90)
- The Unexpected #138, 140, 144, 150, 151–153, 156–157, 168–169, 177, 191 (1972–79)
- Vigilante (inks) #24–25 (1985–86)
- Weird Mystery Tales #5, 10, 13–14 (1973–74)
- Weird War Tales #9, 11, 15–16, 20, 23, 25–29, 35, 42–44, 72, 74 (1972–79)
- Weird Western Tales (El Diablo) #16–17 (1973)
- Witching Hour #24, 27, 33, 41, 43 (1972–74)
- World of Smallville (inks) #1–4 (miniseries, 1988)
- World's Finest Comics (inks) #309, 312–314, 318–321, 323 (1984–86)
- Young All-Stars (inks) #5 (1987)

=== Eclipse Comics ===
- Destroyer Duck (inks) #1–7 (1982–1984)

=== Marvel Comics ===
- Conan the Barbarian (full art): #137, 225; (inks over other artists pencils): #209–219, 223 (1982–89)
- Captain Marvel #35 (1974)
- Doctor Strange vol. 2 #19 (1976)
- Dracula Lives (inks) #9 (1974)
- Freddy Krueger's A Nightmare on Elm Street (inks) #1–2 (1989)
- Giant-Size Chillers #1 (1975)
- Howard the Duck vol. 2 (inks) #7 (1980)
- The Incredible Hulk Annual (inks) #8 (1979); vol.1 #221, 222 (1978 )
- Iron Man (inks) #112 (1978)
- Ka-Zar (inks) #6, 8 (1974–75)
- Kull the Destroyer #17 (1976)
- Man-Thing #14, Giant-Size #3 (1975)
- Marvel Comics Presents (inks) #16, 53 (1989–90)
- Marvel Comics Super Special (inks) #2 (1977)
- Marvel Preview #14 (1978)
- Marvel Two-in-One (inks) #42 (1978)
- Planet of the Apes #7–11, 17–21, 24 (1975–76)
- The Rampaging Hulk (then The Hulk!) (inks) #1–3, 5, 8, 15, 17–20, 22–26 (1977–81)
- Dazzler (inks) #1 (1981)
- Savage Sword of Conan (full art): #55, 75, 80, 83, 89, 216, 223; (inks over John Buscema pencils): #2, 4, 7, 12, 15–20, 23–24, 28, 67, 76; (inks over other artists pencils): #34, 59, 69, 180, 184, 189 (1974–94)
- Tales of the Zombie #7–9 (1974–75)
- Tarzan (inks) #9–10 (1977–78)
- Vampire Tales (full art): #6, 8; (inks): #9–10 (1974–75)

=== Warren Publishing ===
- Creepy #94, 99, 101–102, 104, 108, 125, 130 (1978–81)
- Eerie #96, 99–101, 104–105, 113 (1978–80)
- Rook Magazine (full art): #2–9; (inks): #1 (1979–81)
- Vampirella #90 (1980)

Preceded by Klaus Janson	Batman inker 1982–1985	Succeeded by Tom Mandrake
Preceded by John Totleben	Swamp Thing inker 1986–1990	Succeeded by Peter Gross
