= Voltar (comics) =

Comic strip and character by Alfredo Alcala

- Illustration for first release in the Philippines, 1963

Publication information
- Publisher: Craf Publications (Philippines), Warren Publishing (USA)
- Publication date: 1963 (Philippines), 1977 (USA)
- Main character: Voltar

Creative team
- Created by: Alfredo Alcala

Voltar was a comic strip title and comic book character created, written, and illustrated by Filipino illustrator Alfredo Alcala in 1963. A story about Vikings, Voltar was first published in the Philippines by CRAF Publications, a comic book company established by Alcala himself, together with other colleagues in the field of comics such as Virgilio Redondo, Nestor Redondo, Amado Castrillo, and Tony Caravana, among others. Voltar was described as one of the most spectacular comic strips to ever appear in Philippine comics.

Although the inspiration for Voltar, as a Viking saga and as a tale about a "barbarian hero", was the Conan the Barbarian novels written by Robert E. Howard, the style of the illustrations was described by G.W. Thomas as "brilliant for 1963" because it was done seven years before any actual illustration of Conan the Barbarian as a character in comics existed. Voltar was first published in the United States by debuting in Magic Carpet #1 (1977) and then in Warren's comic magazine The Rook in 1980, after Alcala drew artworks for Marvel Comics, particularly The Savage Sword of Conan. "The End Time", written by the Bill DuBay, was printed in The Rook from issue 2 through 9.

== Description ==
The Comics Reporter described Voltar as "an incredibly lavish, lushly-drawn comic book serial that showcased Alcala's diverse interests and influences". According to Orvy Jundis, a scholar in the field of comics, described Voltar in the World Encyclopedia of Comics, as "truly unique" because "it was a continuing series geared towards mass readership. It was written, laid-out, penciled, inked, lettered and published by one man, Alfredo P. Alcala. The brush used to ink many Voltar pages was a special fountain-brush invented by Alcala, thus making the series even more noteworthy." Jundis declared Voltar as "one of the earliest epic comic book series to result from a single creator's vision". Voltar was further regarded by the World Encyclopedia of Comics as "an antonishing display of sustained artistic endeavor" because "[e]very chapter contains a spectacular center spread. Each panel is embellished in an etching style that rivals the works of the old masters. Inch for inch, it is probably the most detailed art ever to appear in comic books."

== Awards and recognition ==
In the Philippines, Alcala obtained awards for Voltar from the Society of Philippine Illustrators and Cartoonists. In the United States, Voltar won for Alcala awards in the field of fantasy and science-fiction during the 1970s. An illustration of Voltar, which was a part of a fantasy and science-fiction exhibition in the United States, became the first prize winner for a heroic fantasy competition in 1971. In 1974, it was featured in the book entitled The Hannes Book Memorial Showcase of Fantasy Art, a compilation of several of the finest artworks in the fantasy genre.

== Collected editions ==
Title	Volume	Issue	Date
Alcala Fight Komix Magasin	Alcala Fight Komix Magasin	#1	July 9, 1963
Subaybayan ang Voltar	Alcala Fight Komix Magasin	#3	August 6, 1963
Voltar	Alcala Fight Komix Magasin	#18	March 17, 1964
Voltar	Magic Carpet	#1	January 1, 1977

== See also ==
Cover for first issue in the United States, 1977 (Magic Carpet #1). For the US release, the script was written by Manuel Auad.

- Ukala
