= Macarthur (novel) =

2007 novel by Bob Ong

McArthur
- First edition
- Author: Bob Ong
- Language: Tagalog
- Genre: Filipino Culture, Drama
- Publisher: Visual Print Enterprises
- Publication date: 2007
- Publication place: Philippines
- Media type: Print (Paperback)
- Pages: 98
- ISBN: 971-9234-24-5
- Preceded by: Stainless Longganisa
- Followed by: Kapitan Sino

Macarthur or the Red Book is a 2007 novel by Filipino author Bob Ong. It is the sixth published work from Ong. As with all Bob Ong's published novels, it is notable for its use of contemporary street Filipino words. It is also notable for its departure from the usual Bob Ong formula of using humor to comment on the various ironies of Filipino culture. Instead, it offers a gritty, realistic look at life in a Philippine slum community.

The title is derived from a slang term for difficult-to-flush feces — a reference to Douglas MacArthur's famous promise, "I shall return". The cover's background, mostly obscured by the bold typeset of the title and by the red color, depicts a toilet bowl.

== Characters ==
- Noel. Their family was once rich until a sudden slow down of business. He first appeared in the place on where Cyrus, Voltron and Jim were talking. It was indicated that Noel was just a typical college student who eventually stopped studying because he lacks the money to afford his college test paper. After a quarrel with her sister, Lyla, he was asked by his own father to leave his house, calling him a "good for nothing". He develops a good friendship with Cyrus' grandfather, Mang Justo, until he is shot (mistook for a monster) by Cyrus. In the end, he returns to his family and, although with doubt, is welcomed by his father, along with the rest of the family.
- Cyrus. The youngest member of their group. Known for his habit of swallowing objects after stealing them. Cyrus lives with his grandfather, Mang Justo, to whom he donated his own kidney. Months after the operation, he accidentally killed his grandfather.
- Voltron. Also known as Denver and Amadeus. His siblings are Stephen, Brooke, Joshua, Kurt, and Gwyneth. Voltron is skinny and has a big chest, small head, big hands and feet and looks like a robot that rains saliva when talking. He gets beheaded by a gangster.
- Jim. He is 23 years old— the oldest in the group. He has a big body which can lift a sack of rice and a small brain which is enough to carry a foil that will burn crystal meth. He has a wife and son, and is persuaded to leave Manila for the province because of his family's needs.
- Mang Justo. Cyrus' grandfather who works as a barber.
- Aling Seding. Mother of Voltron who is an alcoholic and a gambler.
- Mang Fred. Father of Noel who works abroad.
- Aling Sally. Mother of Noel.
- Lyla. Older sister of Noel.
- Apple. Younger sister of Noel
- Gweneth. Younger sister of Voltron.
- Joshua. Younger Brother of Voltron
- Olive. Jim's wife

== Sources ==
- Anonymous (2008). "'McArthur' ni Bob Ong, Inilunsad" ['McArthur' by Bob Ong, Launched]. Culture. Rock Czar (in Filipino). Archived from the original on October 4, 2008.

== See also ==
- ABNKKBSNPLAko?!, another of Bob Ong's novels
