= Ang Paboritong Libro ni Hudas =

2003 book by Bob Ong

- First edition cover of Ang Paboritong Libro ni Hudas
- Author: Bob Ong
- Language: Tagalog
- Genre: humor, biography
- Publisher: Visual Print Enterprises
- Publication date: 2003
- Publication place: Philippines
- Media type: Print paperback
- ISBN: 971-92342-1-0
- OCLC: 57417594
- Preceded by: Bakit Baligtad Magbasa ng Libro ang mga Pilipino?
- Followed by: Alamat ng Gubat

Ang Paboritong Libro ni Hudas (The Favorite Book of Judas) or The Black Book is a 2003 semi-biography book by Filipino author Bob Ong. It was his third published work and the first book where he first introduces fiction to his readers.

== Chapter ==
Each chapter title is an anagram of the 7 deadly/capital sins:

Chapter	Title
Chapter 1	Veny - Envy
Chapter 2	Geran - Anger
Chapter 3	Depir - Pride
Chapter 4	Ventocoseuss - Covetousness
Chapter 5	Tuls - Lust
Chapter 6	Gynottul - Gluttony
Chapter 7	Holts - Sloth

Each chapter tells a story, the theme of which is the deadly sin corresponding to its title.

The book is also divided into two different types—first is fiction; the conversation scenes between the man who committed suicide and the other one, that he didn't recognize if it is God he was talking to, or if it is just Lucifer tricking him. The other one is nonfiction, in which the narration of the author's point of view.
