= Ang mga Kaibigan ni Mama Susan (film) =

2023 horror film by Chito S. Roño

- Promotional release poster
- Directed by: Chito S. Roño
- Written by: Bob Ong
- Story by: Bob Ong
- Based on: Ang mga Kaibigan ni Mama Susan by Bob Ong
- Produced by: Kriz G. Gazmen
- Starring: Joshua Garcia; Angie Ferro; Jewel Milag; Yñigo Delen; Kelvin Miranda
- Cinematography: Eli Balce
- Edited by: Carlo Francisco Manatad
- Music by: Andrew Florentino
- Production companies: Regal Entertainment; Black Sheep Productions; CSR Films PH
- Distributed by: Regal Entertainment; Regal Home Video; Amazon Prime Video
- Release date: May 18, 2023
- Running time: 113 minutes
- Country: Philippines
- Language: Filipino

Ang mga Kaibigan ni Mama Susan (lit. Mama Susan's Friends) is a 2023 Philippine horror thriller film based on Bob Ong's 2010 mystery novel of the same name directed by Chito S. Roño and written by Bob Ong. It stars Joshua Garcia and Angie Ferro in her last film as she died on August 17, 2023.

== Plot ==
The story follows the life of Gilberto "Galo" Manansala, a student from Manila, through his journal entries supposedly as a project for school. In his notes, Galo chose to chronicle the creepy experiences he felt in his grandmother's house. His grandmother whom he calls Mama Susan.

The horror began when Galo returned to their province to look after his Mama Susan. As his curiosity grew, he started seeing weird things and hearing creepy footsteps.

Together with kids Niko and Jezel, Galo begins to uncover the secrets surrounding their community and his grandmother's role in the cult.

== Cast ==
- Joshua Garcia as Galo: He is a student at an unidentified college in Manila, living an ordinary life under the care of his aunt. He has lived with this family since high school and he says that he is thankful for everything that his aunt's family has provided him. At sixteen he is young for a college student, and mentions that he started school at a very young age. Little is known about his appearance, except that he wears glasses and has a short haircut which causes him to be teased as a military cadet. He can be described as a typical male college student from his first journal entries, despite family matters. It can also be concluded that he is intelligent because, in his journal, he states that even though he spaces out in class while writing in his journal, he still manages to recite and get the correct answer. He also gets an offer from an instructor to write in a publication. It is hinted that he can play the guitar.
- Angie Ferro as Mama Susan: Galo's grandmother and the leader of a religious group in their province. She is sick when Galo returns to her home.
- Jewel Milag as Jezel
- Yñigo Delen as Niko
- Ricky Davao as Tiyo Dindo: Auring's husband and Galo's uncle who secretly helps Galo in paying his tuition without the knowledge of Galo's aunt, Tiya Auring.
- Melissa Mendez as Tiya Auring: Galo's primary guardian and the sister of Galo's mom. She has four children and is aloof and stern, according to Galo's description. He says that he tries not to get involved with his aunt as long as he can get away with it. She is bossy and loud.
- Vangie Labalan as Aling Delia: The right-hand woman of Mama Susan.
- Kelvin Miranda as Louie
- Mon Confiado as Bangkero
- Archi Adamos as Mangingisda
- Soliman Cruz as Mang Narcing
- Sarah Edwards as Andrea
- Patrick Quiroz as Jovit
- Henz Villaraiz as Roy
- Dexter Doria as Mrs. Lao
- Menggie Cobarrubias as Dean
- Rolando Inocencio as Priest
- Alex Cortez as Tagasibak ng Kahoy
- Liya Sarmiento as Manggugulay
- Rhed Bustamante as Sheryl

== Production ==
In March 2016, a possible film adaptation of the book had been teased on Bob Ong's Facebook page. On February 6, 2020, it was announced that the book will finally be adapted into film, starring Joshua Garcia as Galo, which will be directed by Chito S. Roño and will be co-produced by Black Sheep Productions and Regal Entertainment.

=== Filming ===
The shooting was postponed due to COVID-19 pandemic in the Philippines and was resumed on June 20, 2020, after the cast and crew went in self-quarantine. The film was shot in Magalang, Pampanga.

== Release ==
The film was released on May 18, 2023, on Amazon Prime Video. It was previously set on December 25, 2020, as official entry of 2020 Metro Manila Film Festival

== Reception ==
Lé Baltar of Rappler gave the film a negative review and wrote: If there is anything that the film gets right, it's the point that adopting a written work for the screen, no matter how rich and potent, takes a lot more than being well versed in the original material.

Carlos Pineda of Spin.ph criticizes the execution of the film and he said: Overall, Ang Mga Kaibigan ni Mama Susan tries to creatively bring something new into the horror mystery genre, but ends up looking lost in terms of execution. Looking back, I reflected if the film's obsession with audience interpretation was the best method given that some of the narratives weren't really fleshed out.
