= Jay Oliva =

American filmmaker

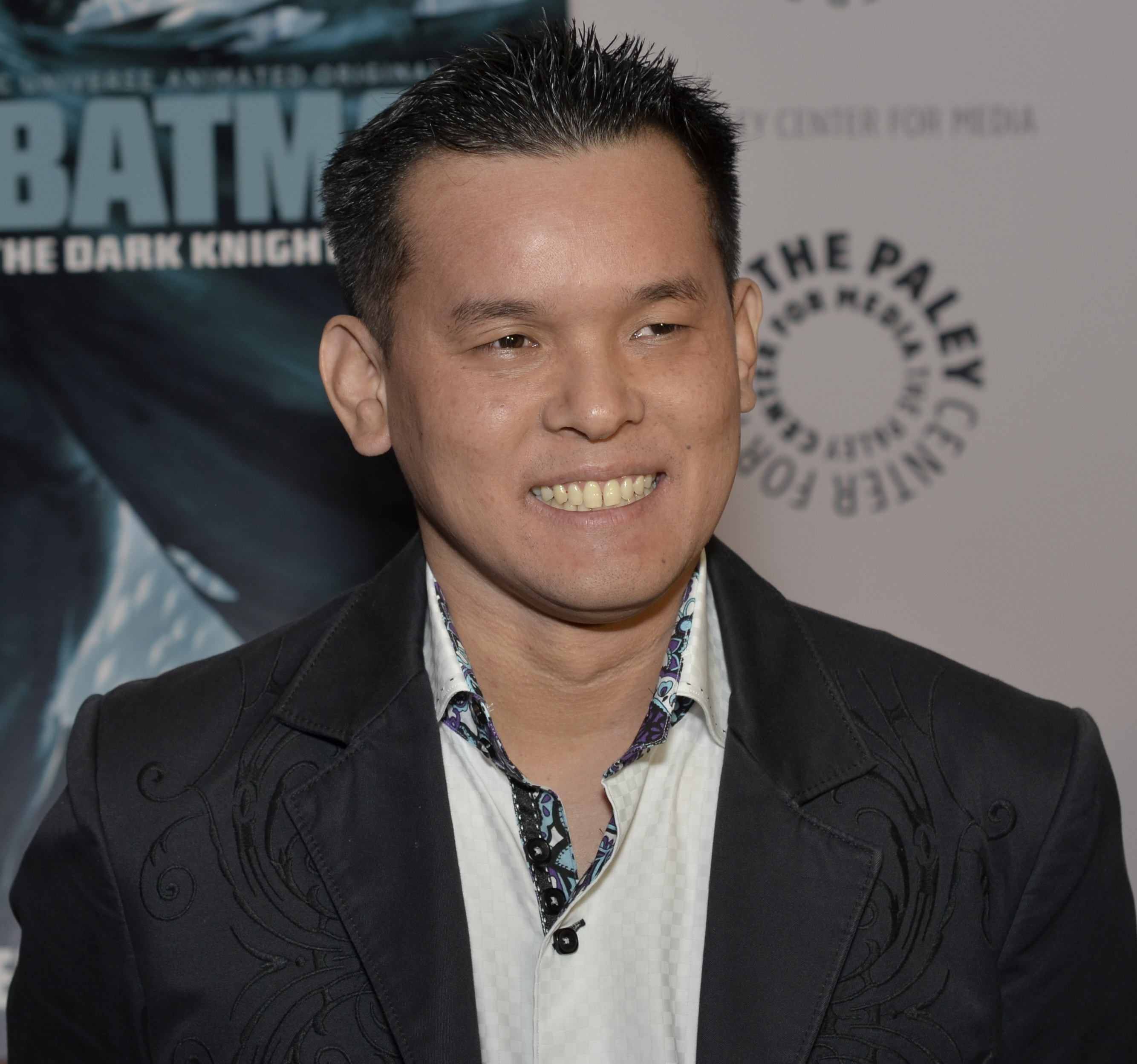
- Oliva in 2012
- Born: Jay Oliva; 1976 (age 49–50); United States
- Occupation: Film director
- Website: cinematicstoryboard.com

Jay Oliva is an American film director, producer, and storyboard artist working at Los Angeles–based animation studio Lex+Otis.

== Early life ==
Jay Oliva studied at Servite High School before graduating and going to Loyola Marymount University. He is of Filipino descent.

== Career ==
Oliva first started in animation as a cleanup artist for the animated Fox TV series Spider-Man in 1996, where he eventually started his career as a storyboard artist. He then moved to Sony Animation in 1997 and storyboarded on Extreme Ghostbusters. He would stay at Sony for the next five years where he worked on Godzilla: The Series and then eventually becoming a director on the animated TV series Roughnecks: The Starship Troopers Chronicles which was then followed by Heavy Gear and Max Steel. Before leaving Sony, he storyboarded on Jackie Chan Adventures. He went on to work as storyboard supervisor on the Mike Young Productions/Mattel series He-Man and the Masters of the Universe and the follow-up Masters of the Universe vs. the Snake Men. He was then hired as a storyboard artist for the first season of the hit series The Batman, after which then moved back to Sony Animation to direct the last season of Jackie Chan Adventures.

While at Sony, he worked as storyboard artist on Stuart Little 3: Call of the Wild in 2005. After working on a few DC animated TV series including Teen Titans and Justice League, he then moved to the Marvel/Lionsgate studios where he directed The Invincible Iron Man and Doctor Strange: The Sorcerer Supreme. After which, he was then hired by The Walt Disney Company to storyboard on the critically acclaimed children's series My Friends Tigger & Pooh. During this period he also worked as a storyboard artist on Superman: Doomsday before moving one last time back to Marvel to direct Marvel Animation's Next Avengers: Heroes of Tomorrow.

Oliva worked as a storyboard artist on Marvel's Hulk Vs and DC's Wonder Woman, both of which were deemed successful. After working on six other DC Comics projects such as Green Lantern: First Flight, Superman/Batman: Public Enemies, Justice League: Crisis on Two Earths, Batman: Under the Red Hood, Superman/Batman: Apocalypse and All-Star Superman, he was asked to once again direct an animated film but this time for WB/DC, Green Lantern: Emerald Knights. He also went on to direct many episodes of the animated series Young Justice. Oliva worked on the Disney XD/Marvel Animation animated series The Avengers: Earth's Mightiest Heroes.

In late 2012, he was assigned by Warner Bros. Animation to direct a two-part animated film, Batman: The Dark Knight Returns, based on the comic book series of the same name by Frank Miller. Part 1 achieved a 100% score by Rotten Tomatoes.

In 2013, he, along with Zack Snyder, storyboarded his first live-action feature film, Man of Steel, after which he was tasked to make Justice League: The Flashpoint Paradox, based on the comic storyline "Flashpoint" by Geoff Johns, which received generally positive reviews. He was then tasked to helm the next animated movie, Justice League: War, which was based on DC's 2011 inaugural storyline for its monthly comics relaunch, The New 52. It was released in 2013, adapting the branding's first Justice League story arc. He would also, alongside Son of Batman director Ethan Spaulding, co-direct Batman: Assault on Arkham released in 2014, set in the Batman: Arkham video game series.

Spaulding replaced Oliva as director for the sequel Justice League: Throne of Atlantis, based on the Justice League/Aquaman storyline of the same name also by Geoff Johns. Oliva then directed the film Batman vs. Robin, released in 2016, before joining Zack Snyder in storyboarding his live-action film Batman v Superman: Dawn of Justice, set in the DC Extended Universe. Oliva returned to directing for Warner Bros. Animation with Batman: Bad Blood.

His first work in the Marvel Cinematic Universe was help storyboarding on Peyton Reed's live-action adaptation of Ant-Man in 2015, as well as Tim Miller's live-action adaptation of Deadpool released in 2016, set in the X-Men film series.

Oliva worked as a storyboard artist on multiple episodes of The CW's live-action TV adaptation of The Flash.

In 2016, Oliva directed Justice League Dark, the second animated DC movie with an R rating and would be released digitally on January 24, 2017.

Throughout 2016, Oliva was splitting his time directing for WB/DC animated films and storyboarding live-action films and commercials. However, by August 29, 2017, Oliva clarified he is no longer working for Warner Bros., thus making Justice League Dark his final work with them and DC.

In Singapore on November 8, 2018, Taito Okiura, Netflix's director of international originals, anime, announced it would produce an anime series adaptation of the graphic novel Trese by Filipino comic writer and artist Budjette Tan. Oliva is attached to the project as an executive producer. Set in Manila where mythical creatures of Philippine folklore live in hiding amongs humans, the story pits Alexandra Trese in opposition with a criminal underworld composed of malevolent supernatural beings. The series premiered on June 10, 2021.

Oliva reunited with Zack Snyder and Netflix to develop an anime series based on Norse mythology titled Twilight of the Gods released in late 2024, as well as Army of the Dead: Lost Vegas, an anime prequel series to Army of the Dead, for which Oliva will serve as showrunner. Oliva is attached to a Court of the Dead anime series as well.

On March 13, 2023 Plarium released the official teaser of their limited animated series RAID: Call of the Arbiter which is based on their arcane dark fantasy RPG game Raid: Shadow Legends. The web series premiered on May 18 on YouTube. Oliva is credited as the show's film director and showrunner.

On March 7, 2024, Ark: The Animated Series, based on the video game Ark: Survival Evolved by Studio Wildcard, premiered as a surprise drop on Paramount+. Oliva serves as director and executive producer on the series.
