= Trese (TV series) =

2021 animated television series

- Promotional poster with Netflix Philippines' release date
- Trese
- Genre: Crime; Fantasy; Horror; Mystery; Thriller
- Created by: Budjette Tan; Kajo Baldisimo
- Based on: Trese by: Budjette Tan; and Kajo Baldisimo
- Written by: Zig Marasigan; Mihk Vergara; Tanya Yuson
- Directed by: Jay Oliva; Tim Divar; David Hartman; Mel Zwyer
- Starring: Liza Soberano (Filipino); Shay Mitchell (English); Ryoko Shiraishi (Japanese)
- Opening theme: "Balluha'd Bayauhen" (Hudhud)
- Ending theme: "Paagi" by UDD
- Composer: The Kiners
- Countries of origin: Singapore (Note: Although Trese was based on a Filipino komik and had the collaboration of several Filipino animators, the series was produced by BASE Entertainment which is a studio based in Singapore and Jakarta, Indonesia.); United States
- Original languages: English; Filipino
- No. of seasons: 1
- No. of episodes: 6

Production
- Executive producers: Jay Oliva; Tanya Yuson; Shanty Harmayn
- Producer: Pariy Hwea
- Cinematography: Lee Loo
- Animator: Tiger Animation
- Editor: Christopher Lozinski
- Running time: 25–33 minutes
- Production companies: BASE Entertainment; Lex+Otis Animation

Original release
- Network: Netflix
- Release: June 10, 2021 (Note: The series premiered on Netflix globally on June 11, 2021.)

Trese (Tagalog: [ˈtrɛsɛ]) is an anime-influenced television series based on the Filipino comic series of the same name by Budjette Tan and Kajo Baldisimo. An international co-production of Singapore and the United States, the series was released on June 10, 2021 on Netflix in the United States, which was followed by a global release the next day.

== Characters ==
=== Main ===
- Alexandra Trese

Voiced by: Shay Mitchell (English); Liza Soberano (Filipino); Ryoko Shiraishi (Japanese)
A healer-warrior who serves as a protector of humanity from supernatural beings from the underworld.
Soberano, more known for doing television drama roles, was initially hesitant on doing the role of Alexandra remarking that "voice acting is a different game from acting". In contrast to dubbing her own films and commercials, Soberano added that she had to portray a "new character" instead of being her own "natural self". Shay Mitchell, on her part, described her role in the English dub as "super fun, but intense". Mitchell also had to recite some lines in Filipino, a language she has said she is familiar with but not fluent in. She worked with a dialect coach before each voice over session via Zoom. Rudolf Baldonado coached Soberano to modulate and lower the pitch of her voice for her role. She also had to work on her accent when speaking Filipino. Steffi Graf Bontogon-Mola also voices Alexandra's younger self. Meanwhile, Satomi Kobayashi dubs Alexandra's younger self in Japanese.

- Kambal / Crispin and Basilio

Voiced by: Griffin Puatu (English); Simon dela Cruz (Filipino); Yoshihisa Hosokawa (Japanese)
Twins who serve as Alexandra's bodyguards and are collectively known as the Kambal (Twins).

- Captain Guerrero

Voiced by: Matt Yang King (English); Apollo Abraham (Filipino); Ken Uo (Japanese)

- Hank

Voiced by: Jon Jon Briones (English); Christopher Carlo Caling (Filipino); Yūki Sanpei (Japanese)

- Anton Trese

Voiced by: Carlos Alazraqui (English); Eugene Adalia (Filipino); Ken Yanai (Japanese)
Alexandra's father.

=== Others ===
- Miranda Trese

Voiced by: Nicole Scherzinger (English); Cheska Aguiluz (Filipino); Kiyoko Yonekura (Japanese)

- Maliksi

Voiced by: Manny Jacinto (English); Steve dela Cruz (Filipino)

- Bagyon Kulimlim

Voiced by: Dante Basco (English); Jose Amado Santiago (Filipino); Takashi Uezumiya (Japanese)

- Bagyon Lektro

Voiced by: Eric Bauza (English); Christopher Carlo Caling (Filipino); Yuki Tamai (Japanese)

- Ibwa

Voiced by: Steve Blum (English); Elyrey Martin (Filipino)

- Nuno

Voiced by: Eric Bauza (English); Christian Velarde (Filipino); Hironori Saito (Japanese)

- Marco Guerrero

Voiced by: Darren Criss (English); Jose Amado Santiago (Filipino); Noriyuki Tsuyuki (Japanese)

- Mayor Sancho Santamaria

Voiced by: Lou Diamond Phillips (English); Rene Tandoc (Filipino); Yasuhiro Kikuchi (Japanese)

- Bantay

Voiced by: Griffin Puatu (English); Masashi Hashimoto (Japanese)

- Puti

Voiced by: Yasuhiro Kikuchi (Japanese)

- Young Crispin / Basilio

Voiced by: Ratana (English)

- Santelmo

Voiced by: Carlos Alazraqui (English); R.J. Celdran (Filipino); Noriyuki Tsuyuki (Japanese)

- Lieutenant Tapia

Voiced by: Takashi Uezumi (Japanese)

- Woman reporter

Voiced by: Deedee Magno Hall (English); Satomi Kobayashi (Japanese)

- Reyes

Voiced by: Masashi Hashimoto (Japanese)

- Emissary

Voiced by: Deedee Magno Hall (English); Jo Anne Orobia-Chu (Filipino); Riho Sugiyama (Japanese)

- Amie

Voiced by: Tania Gunadi (English); Satomi Kobayashi (Japanese)

- Hannah

Voiced by: Tania Gunadi (English); Riho Sugiyama (Japanese)

- Dominic

Voiced by: Yang King (English); Elyrey Martin (Filipino)

- Coleen

Voiced by: Momoe Touko (Japanese)

- Amang Paso

Voiced by: Yasuhiro Kikuchi (Japanese)

- Nova Aurora

Voiced by: Leslie-Anne Huff (English); Momoe Touko (Japanese)

- Jobert*

Voiced by: Jeff Manabat (English)

- Dr. Petra Gallaga

Voiced by: Ratana (English); Satomi Kobayashi (Japanese)

- Raul Lazaro

Voiced by: Yuki Tamai (Japanese)

- Ramona

Voiced by: Sumalee Montano (English); Rica Rojo (Filipino); Kiyoko Yonekura (Japanese)

- Colonel Hidalgo

Voiced by: Reuben Uy (English)

- General Villar

Voiced by: Earl Baylon (English)

- Datu Talagbusao

Voiced by: Steve Blum (English); Bryan Allan Encarnacion (Filipino); Atsuki Tani (Japanese)

== Production ==
The series was first announced in November 2018, with Jay Oliva as executive producer and director. Other directors include David Hartman, Mel Zwyer, and Tim Divar. The series is written by Zig Marasigan, Mihk Vergara and Tanya Yuson. Yuson also serves as executive producer for BASE Entertainment with Shanty Harmayn. The series was produced by BASE Entertainment (from Singapore) and Lex+Otis Animation (from the United States) and animated by Tiger Animation (from South Korea). At the Netflix Anime Festival in October 2020, it was revealed that Trese komik artist Kajo Baldisimo and writer Budjette Tan will serve as showrunners.

In 2009, Tanya Yuson was looking for material to adapt for a series or film. She picked up Trese, the graphic novel, following a recommendation. Yuson forwarded the comic to her fellow producer Shanty Harmayn who convinced her that they should pitch the adaptation of Trese into an animated series. They pitched to both production studios within and outside the Philippines; with Netflix Anime agreeing to adapt Trese. In May 2018 Netflix reach out to Jay Oliva, who was based in the United States at the time, to work with a potential Trese animated series. Oliva accepted the role to be Trese's director a month later. A copy of the Trese comics was sent to Oliva, who started working on the series while in his flight to Manila from the United States.

Oliva tried to balance out the Trese animated series to satisfy the existing fanbase and those who were not familiar with the original source material. He intended to retain the source material's central theme of "family and duty" which he describe are "universal ideas and very Filipino".

Three separate dubbings for English, Filipino and Japanese were made for Trese. In non-Filipino versions, some Filipino dialogue, such as the phrase "tabi tabi po" were used to retain the series' "Pinoy" flavor and encourage foreigners to learn the Filipino language and culture. Among the three dubbings, English was the dubbing that was done first with the Filipino dubbing had to be based on the English version.

=== Writing ===
Trese was adapted from the first three volumes of the comics. Originally intended to be standalone by the source material's creators, the series was written in a way that connects the three volumes into one single arc.

=== Marketing ===
Trese's marketing promotions have been praised online, including praise for billboards on EDSA and major streets in the Philippines that include a unique design style to make the billboards appear to have been vandalized or torn. This garnered a great deal of attention from Filipinos on social media, Twitter and Facebook. Popular local newspaper The Philippine Star also put Trese on its front page according to their official Twitter account, and business newspaper Business World also put out a major advertisement. Media giant ABS-CBN Corporation also promoted the series by replacing the logo outside their broadcasting headquarters in Quezon City with the logo of Netflix's Trese series counterpart, ABC-ZNN, a fictitious media company used in the series. ABS-CBN also lit up their ELJ Communications Center building in Quezon City with the word Trese written on their facade.

=== Music ===
Kevin Kiner's children Sean and Deana Kiner composed the musical score for Trese. The theme song is "Paagi" (translates from Visayan for "excuse me") by Filipino band UDD. The song served as the ending theme song and was written in the middle of the COVID-19 pandemic in 2020. Production of the song took place in two phases. Paul Yap, Ean Mayor and Carlos Tanada did the first demo recording at the Wonder Collab Studios after which it was sent to Armi Millare for finalization. Millare revised the "Paagi"'s lyrics and Emil Dela Rosa did the remix and master of the song. Director Oliva characterized the song as "contemporary music but with Filipino instruments".

== Episodes ==
No.	Title	Directed by	Written by	Original release date
1	"Episode 1"	Jay Oliva	Tanya Yuson	June 10, 2021
When a ghost turns up dead and train passengers go missing, Trese's investigation leads her to an aswang clan by the pier and a corrupt city official.
2	"Episode 2"	Mel Zwyer	Zig Marasigan	June 10, 2021
In a flashback, Trese's father searches for a heart-stealing killer. Trese pursues the sons of two clan leaders who may be behind recent transgressions.
3	"Episode 3"	David Hartman	Tanya Yuson	June 10, 2021
Ramona attempts a blood ritual to exact revenge. Trese, the "boys" and Hank protect an actress as Trese receives a warning of "liars amongst allies."
4	"Episode 4"	David Hartman	Mihk Vergara	June 10, 2021
While Trese fights to undo a spell that sent zombies to attack the police station, Hank tries to uncover details about the coming turmoil.
5	"Episode 5"	Tim Divar	Mihk Vergara	June 10, 2021
After a rash of bombings, the Council makes a surprising decision. Trese discovers who's been responsible for manipulating recent events all along.
6	"Episode 6"	Jay Oliva	Zig Marasigan	June 10, 2021
With humanity and the supernatural world both in danger, Trese confronts Talagbusao to fight her own destiny, and learns the truth about her father.

== Release ==
Trese was made available for viewing on the online platforms starting June 10, 2021 in the United States, followed by Singapore on June 11. The release featured six episodes covering storylines from the comic's first three volumes. The series was released in English, Filipino and Japanese languages, with each version having its own set of cast.

At Netflix's virtual "Geeked Week" livestream on June 9, the first five minutes of Trese's episode was previewed.

== Reception ==
Trese was in the top 10 TV shows list on Netflix in 19 countries as of June 13, 2021, ranking highest in the following countries: Philippines (#1), Qatar (#3), United Arab Emirates (#4), and Jamaica (#5). Other countries where the show ranked were Austria, Bangladesh, Bulgaria, Canada, Estonia, Germany, Kuwait, Lithuania, New Zealand, Nigeria, Oman, Serbia, Singapore, Sri Lanka, and the United States. The series became the highest ranked show on Netflix in the Philippines on the weekend following its premiere date.

Director Jay Oliva was told by Netflix that Trese is "really strong" and reliant on the Philippine market with Oliva expressing possibilities for "multiple seasons" if Trese continues to receive positive reception.

In a review for Rabbit Hole, Shaun Tan wrote that the show "captures the urban grittiness of Manila." He praised the plot, dialogue, animation, and voice acting, calling it "a paranormal Filipino film noir that is both stylish and gripping."

In the online anthropology magazine SAPIENS, Andrea Malaya M. Ragragio and Myfel D. Paluga noted that the show's portrayal of Talagbusao as "a bloodthirsty, male “god of war” whose nature is to wreak havoc and thrive in it" drew largely from American colonial era anthropologist Fay-Cooper Cole's description of him as a “patron of the warriors and of people who run amuck,” which dates back to the early 1900s. As a result, they say that " the Talagbusao depicted in Trese barely resembled what Indigenous communities in Mindanao mean when they talk about this entity or its related forms, called busaw." But Ragragio and Paluga also acknowledged that the show likely changed his characterization "simply to tell an enjoyable detective story, with a Filipino folkloric flair."
