= Kikomachine Komix =

Filipino comic strip by Manix Abrera

- Author: Manix Abrera
- Illustrator: Manix Abrera
- Launch date: 2001
- Publisher: Philippine Daily Inquirer
- Original language: Filipino

Kikomachine Komix is a comic strip created by Filipino cartoonist and musician Manix Abrera. It was first published in Philippine Daily Inquirer in 2001 and has since appeared daily.

== History ==
Kikomachine Komix was first published at the student newspaper Philippine Collegian in 2001, by Manix Abrera a then-second year college student. The comics strips later became a regular fixture of the Philippine Daily Inquirer

The name "Kikomachine" was derived from Abrera's band of the same name ("Kiko Machine"), which was inspired by the character Kiko Matsing of the Filipino children's television shows Sesame! and Batibot.

== Film adaptation ==
A film adaptation of the comic strip is set to be made. In March 2018, Abrera signed a contract with Epik Studios, in cooperation with Viva Entertainment. In an interview with the Philippine Daily Inquirer, Abrera said that he will be involved with conceptualization and casting. The film's release date is yet to be determined.

== Collected editions ==
Title	Publisher	Issue	ISBN	Date of publication
Mga Tagpong Mukhang Ewan at Kung Anu-Ano Pang Kababalaghan!	Visprint	#1	ISSN 1908-4722	June 2005
Mga Tagpong Tila Nagpapaka-Weird, Kunyari Pa-Deep, Sarap Sapakin...	Visprint	#2	ISSN 1908-4722	August 2006
Die! Die, Evil! Die! Ahrrrgh!	Visprint	#3	ISSN 1908-4722	June 2007
O Kaligayahang Walang Hanggan Yeh!	Visprint	#4	ISBN 971-92574-6-6, 978-9-7192-5746-2	February 2008
Alab ng Puso sa Dibdib Mo'y Buhay!	Visprint	#5	ISBN 971-05450-0-0, 978-9-7105-4500-1	January 2009
Venn Man at Iba Pang Kalupitan ng Kapalaran!	Visprint	#6	ISBN 971-05450-2-7, 978-9-7105-4502-5	September 2010
Sorrowful, Sorrowful Mysteries!	Visprint	#7	ISBN 971-05450-5-1, 978-9-7105-4505-6	October 2011
$\varphi=\frac{13}{8}+\sum_{n=0}^\infty\frac{(-1)^{(n+1)}(2n+1)!}{(n+2)!n!4^{(2n+3)}}$	Visprint	#8	ISBN 971-05451-3-2, 978-9-7105-4513-1	May 2012
Ilayo Mo Kami sa Apoy ng Impyerno	Visprint	#9	ISBN 971-05452-0-5, 978-9-7105-4520-9	March 2013
Sanduguan ng Sangkalawakan!	Visprint	#10	ISBN 971-05453-2-9, 978-9-7105-4532-2	February 2014
Mga Kirot ng Kapalaran!	Visprint	#11	ISBN 971-05455-2-3, 978-9-7105-4552-0	March 2015
Mandirigma ng Tadhana!	Visprint	#12	ISBN 971-05457-0-1, 978-9-7105-4570-4	November 2016
Aklat Sekreto ng mga Lihim na Karunungan	Visprint	#13	ISBN 971-05458-1-7, 978-9-7105-4581-0	October 2017
Alaala ng Kinabukasan	Visprint	#14	ISBN 978-9-7105-4596-5	November 2018
Bulwagan ng Misteryo	Avenida	#15	ISBN 621-96223-0-8, 978-6-2196-2230-1	2019
Nang Malingat ang Tadhana	Avenida	#16	ISBN 621-962237-5, 978-6-2196-2237-0	2021
Meanwhile sa Parallel Earth!...	Avenida	#17	ISBN 978-6-2106-0119-0	2022
