= Zsazsa Zaturnnah Ze Moveeh =

2006 Filipino fantasy comedy film

- Theatrical release poster
- Directed by: Joel C. Lamangan
- Screenplay by: Dinno Erece
- Based on: Zsazsa Zaturnnah by Carlo Vergara
- Produced by: Lily Y. Monteverde; Roselle Monteverde-Teo
- Starring: Zsa Zsa Padilla; BB Gandanghari; Pops Fernandez; Chokoleit; Alfred Vargas
- Cinematography: Lyle Sacris
- Edited by: Jay Halili
- Music by: Vincent de Jesus
- Production company: Regal Entertainment
- Release date: December 25, 2006 (Philippines)
- Running time: 115 minutes
- Country: Philippines
- Language: Tagalog
- Box office: ₱11 million

Zsazsa Zaturnnah Ze Moveeh is a 2006 Filipino superhero musical film directed by Joel C. Lamangan and written by Dinno Erece, based on Carlo Vergara's graphic novel. The film stars Zsa Zsa Padilla, BB Gandanghari, Chokoleit, Pops Fernandez and Alfred Vargas, and follows a gay Filipino beautician who, after swallowing a space rock, becomes imbued with superpowers.

The cinematic version closely follows the theatrical production staged by the CCP's Tanghalang Pilipino under Chris Millado.

== Plot ==
Ada, a gay beautician from the Philippines, spends her days with her best friend/assistant Didi. One evening, as Ada bathes, a meteor falls from the sky, punches a hole through the bathroom roof and hits her on the head. Ada tells Didi what happened, and Didi convinces her that she should swallow the meteor/rock in case it will give her superpowers, just like Darna. The duo discover the word Zaturnnah engraved on it. Convinced, Ada does so, then shouts "Zaturnnah!" and, in a puff of smoke, she turns into a voluptuous red-headed woman. Shocked, Didi takes it in stride and convinces Ada to find out if she had superpowers, which she does. Ada decides to adopt the name Zsazsa Zaturnnah for her superheroine persona.

Ada/Zaturnnah encounters strange occurrences all over town, including zombies and attacks by a giant frog, but with Didi and love interest Dodong by her side. Later, Zaturnnah encounters beings from outer space ... females from the Planet XXX called Amazonistas, led by the fierce Queen Feminah Suarestellar Baroux, who reveals that, on their planet, all men were transformed into pigs when the women revolted because of centuries of oppression from the males chauvinists. They invite Zaturnnah to join, unaware of her true identity. Zaturnnah declines, angering Feminah to challenge her to a duel to the death.

A furious battle ensues and at first it seems that they are evenly matched. Feminah pitches once more to Zaturnnah, but not only does Zaturnnah decline, she regurgitates the rock, instantly reverting her to her male form, and shoves the rock into Feminah's mouth, transforming her into a "male pig", which prompts the Amazonistas to hunt. Powerless and weak, Ada collapses. Dodong arrives and rescues her. Ada confesses her love, which he reciprocates. The scene then cuts to Ada packing away her things and saying that she is moving to Manila. Dodong arrives and asks if he could join her when she moves to Manila. While she initially doubts his sincerity, Ada is convinced.

As the happy couple lives along the riles in Manila, another meteor falls from the sky and hits Ada.

== Cast ==
- BB Gandanghari as Adrian "Ada"
- Zsa Zsa Padilla as Zsazsa Zaturnnah
- Chokoleit as Didi
- Alfred Vargas as Dodong
- Pops Fernandez as Queen Feminah Suarestellar Baroux
- Pauleen Luna as Aruba
- Alwyn Uytingco as Poldo
- Kitkat as Nora A.
- Say Alonzo as Vilma S.
- Giselle Sanchez as Sharon C.
- Glaiza de Castro as Dina B.
- Joy Viado as Krystal
- Minnie Aguilar as Aling Britney
- Christian Vasquez as Mang Justin
- Jim Pebanco as Father Bernie
