= Trese =

Filipino komiks

- Original cover image of the first issue of Trese

Publication information
- Publisher: Alamat Comics; Visprint (formerly Visual Print Enterprises); Avenida Books; Ablaze Publishing
- Format: Ongoing series
- Genre: Dark fantasy Crime; Horror
- Publication date: December 2005 – present
- No. of issues: Main Cases: 13; Collected Editions: 9

Creative team
- Created by: Budjette Tan; Kajo Baldisimo
- Written by: Budjette Tan, J.B. Tapia, David Hontiveros
- Artist(s): Kajo Baldisimo, Ian Sta Maria, Mark Torres, J.B. Tapia and Brian Balondo

Trese (Tagalog: [ˈtrɛsɛ]) is a Filipino komik series written by Budjette Tan and illustrated by Kajo Baldisimo. It tells the story of Alexandra Trese, a detective who deals with crimes of supernatural origin. Its first issue was published on October 22, 2005, starting off as a niche work which grew in popularity as readers were intrigued first by the first two volumes' focus on Manila's urban legends, and then by the later volumes' development of Alexandra Trese as a character. The series went on to win several accolades.

An animated adaptation for Netflix premiered on June 11, 2021, and has both Tan and Baldisimo as its showrunners and Jay Oliva as executive director.

== Publication history ==
Trese was first published independently by Alamat Comics in ashcan and online format. The komik series is currently available in a collected, graphic novel form, published by Visprint, Inc (formerly Visual Print Enterprises). The retail company National Book Store re-released Trese: Last Seen After Midnight and Trese: Midnight Tribunal with dust jackets, while the local comic bookstore Filbar's re-released the first three books with dust jackets.

A hardcover compilation titled Trese: Book of Murders has also been published and contains the first three graphic novels. These compilations include journal entries from the protagonist's grandfather, Alexander Trese, which serve as additional commentary, providing more history and lore for each case. Trese: Stories from the Diabolical Volume 1 were tales originally published online as early as 2005 and compiled in 2008 in a blog before it collated and published as a book in 2013. Cases #1, #2, and #4 were re-published by Visprint with updated, colored art by Kajo Baldisimo and translated into Filipino by Bob Ong. They also contained the translated journal entries from Trese: Book of Murders.

Trese and the Kambal have also appeared in other publications such as Skyworld and Agents of Ambush.

After the closing of Visprint Inc. in 2021, Avenida Books became the new publisher of the Trese series. Trese Lite Postcard Book Vol. 1 was the first to be published under Avenida Books followed by the reprints of the first three main volumes which coincides with the release of the Netflix anime adaptation. The reprints featured new pages and remastered artwork that includes extended action scenes and original concept sketches by Kajo Baldisimo, similar to the US edition.

=== Other publications ===
With the goal of reaching a larger audience, the creators set up an Indiegogo campaign for the production of an international 32-page edition of Case 1: At the Intersection of Balete and 13th Street that would contain updated text and art with bonus pages and would also include the same journal entries from Book of Murders. Aside from a variant cover exclusive, supporters could also avail the Indiegogo sketch variant with uniquely drawn covers. The campaign was endorsed by Neil Gaiman. Supporters from the Philippines were given freebies, 2 of the 16 designs sketches that were drawn in 13 ways, and a reprint of the original Trese #1 ashcan.

At the release of Trese 7: Shadow Witness, Visprint Inc. sold more than 300 copies during the 40th Manila International Book Fair. For the 14th anniversary of Trese, a reprint of Trese #1 Global Edition: At the Intersection of Balete and 13th Street was released exclusively by Comic Odyssey and Filbar's and called the "Anniversary Edition" . It differed from the Global Edition in price and size, and included a "self-cover" where the paper used for its pages was also used for the cover page. In the same year, Trese Deviations: Iunctura was released in ashchan format. Another company, Ablaze Publishing, released the U.S. edition of Trese: Murder on Balete Drive, which used the Trese #1 Global Edition comic, along with an exclusive variant cover for Comic Odyssey and Sanctum Sanctorum Comics.

=== Other languages ===
An Italian edition adapted after the U.S. edition was released beginning September 2021 by publisher Star Comics. The first two volumes of Trese were translated into French in March 2022, adapted after the U.S. edition, and released in one volume by publisher Les Éditions Delcourt. A German edition of the first volume was also released in May 2024 by publisher Dantes Verlag.

== Plot ==
"When the sun sets in the city of Manila, don’t you dare make a wrong turn and end up in that dimly-lit side of the metro, where aswang run the most-wanted kidnapping rings, where kapre are the kingpins of crime, and engkantos slip through the cracks and steal your most precious possessions. When crime takes a turn for the weird, the police call Alexandra Trese."

The story of Trese fuses Philippine horror mythology with dark, graphic storytelling and follows Alexandra Trese, a mysterious detective who deals with crimes of supernatural origin mainly occurring in the capital region of the Philippines.

Because of her specialization in the supernatural, Alexandra is often called when the police cannot handle paranormal crimes, by Captain Guerrero, a man who prefers to lean on her knowledge and specialized skills. Alexandra is supported by two mysterious and magical creatures with uncertain powers known as the Kambal and together, they protect the streets of Manila from various creatures of Filipino folklore.

Volume 3 explores Trese's past, when, at 15-years old, she joins her father Anton on her first case. The origins of the Kambal are also revealed in later issues.

Trese was originally planned for 13 chapters or cases. Volumes 1 and 2 comprise self-contained chapters (Cases #1 - #8) and introduce the paranormal world of Manila. Most cases are standalone, with the exception of the third issue, Mass Murders, where Cases #9 - #13 are related and use different cues from previous books. Beginning with Volume 5, the komik series takes on a more serialized progression while continuing to incorporate aspects of episodic storytelling in each issue.

Trese's plot, world-building, and characters have garnered comparisons with American comics such as Hellblazer and Planetary, while writer Budjette Tan cited the former, as well as Batman, X-Files, CSI and Constantine as some of the main inspirations going into the creation of Trese. Tan also named the anime film Ghost in the Shell as a major source of inspiration for Trese.

== Characters ==
=== Main characters ===
- Alexandra Trese – A woman who works as a private detective and specializes in crimes perpetrated by supernatural beings of the Underworld, to which she has a deep connection. She is the proprietor of The Diabolical, a night club that serves the "best kapeng barako" in the street where it stands, which was originally run by Alexandra's grandfather. She is usually dressed in black garb and is often seen working in her trademark outfit a black button-down Chinese-inspired trenchcoat. For weapons, Alexandra uses guns and a magical kris blade called Sinag, which was created by Anton from the soul of Trese's twin sister who had died at birth. Trese appears to have a very complex relationship with her father, Anton. Her psionic potential was revealed at her young age and started aiding her father in investigating the mysteries as a young teenager. She finished her initiation rites within 3 years.

Trese was initially conceived as a male character named Anton Trese. The initial design for the character by Kajo Baldisimo was a "tough guy" who wields a stingray tail as a weapon. Budjette Tan suggested to make Trese as a woman after he felt that the character was "so typical" and remarked that it would be "very cliché to see another tough guy fighting monsters".

- Kambal (Crispin & Basilio) – Alexandra Trese's mysterious and imposing personal bodyguards that are often seen floating and wearing black suits. Each sports a unique diamond-shaped mask, a happy face and a sad face. To tell them apart when they don't have their masks on, Kajo gave the happy-faced Kambal a long haircut and the sad-faced Kambal, a short one. The short-haired Kambal wearing the sad-faced mask is the eldest of the Kambal and is referred to as "Kuya" throughout the first several books until he is finally given the name "Crispin" in Book 6. The younger Kambal with the happy-faced mask and long hair, Basilio, is the more playful of the two. The true nature of their existence is initially unknown until it is later revealed that the Kambal were born from a woman and a Bukidnon war god, making them demi-gods, although their father aims to consume them in order to achieve more power. "Kambal" literally translates to "twins" in English and the names after the characters in Noli Me Tangere.
- Captain Guerrero – He served as a sergeant when Anton Trese, Alexandra's father, was aiding his former superior. Guerrero takes charge of the task force responsible for dealing with the supernatural and mysterious after his superior retires.
- Hank Sparrow – He is the trusted bartender of The Diabolical. He loves to listen to stories of customers and if he likes their story he gives them a drink for free.
- Anton Trese – He is Alexandra Trese's father and the former guardian of Metro Manila. He was a psychic investigator and had six kids. He died protecting Alexandra during her initiation rite when he sacrificed himself to fortify the tree. He is first mentioned in Book 1, and appears in Book 3.

=== Recurring characters ===
- Tapia – Captain Guerrero's right-hand man in his investigations.
- Nuno sa Punso – A small, dwarf-like creature of the Underworld. Their kind once lived in mounds of dirt or ant hills until humans started throwing garbage and littered their homes. This particular nuno lives in a manhole, does not like the sea, and seems to know Alexandra's father. In the komiks, Trese asks for permission when she passes by a dirt mound, saying "Tabi, tabi po. Good evening po," due to a superstition involving powerful curses being inflicted on unsuspecting humans who disturb a nuno's home.
- Maliksi – A tikbalang responsible for multiple illegal drag race accidents held on C-5. He is the son of the Great Stallion and a member of the Armanaz herd.
- Señor Armanaz – A tikbalang and the head of the Armanaz herd.
- Santelmo – A friend of Alexandra who assists her in some of her cases.
- Hannah and Ammie – Hannah and Ammie are Wind-people; beings that possess the magical powers of the wind. Hannah is from the Habagat tribe and Ammie is from the Amihan tribe.
- Madame – A highly influential antagonist with deep connections to the powerful figures of the city, noted to be visually reminiscent of the deposed first lady Imelda Marcos.

== Awards ==
Trese: Mass Murders won the National Book Award Best Graphic Literature 2010. Trese: Last Seen After Midnight, was nominated for the Filipino Readers' Choice Award for Comics/Graphic Novels 2012, and Trese: Midnight Tribunal won the Filipino Readers' Choice Award for Comics/Graphic Novels 2013. Trese: Stories from the Diabolical was nominated for the Filipino Readers' Choice Award for Fictional Anthology 2014, and the anthology book Manila Noir, which contained Trese: Thirteen Stations, won the National Book Award for Best Anthology in English 2014. Trese: High Tide at Midnight was nominated for the National Book Award for Graphic Literature in English 2015.

== Issue synopses ==
Each issue of Trese is split into chapters known as 'cases', some structured like an actual detective case where Alexandra Trese arrives at a crime scene and gathers clues until the case is solved, while others are written as chapters for the issue's main story arc. Starting with the fourth book, cases are no longer numbered, but are listed in the order they appeared.

=== Main series ===
==== Trese 1: Murder at Balete Drive ====
- "Case 1: At the Intersection of Balete and 13th Street"
- "Case 2: The Rules of the Race"
- "Case 3: Our Secret Constellation"
- "Case 4: The Tragic Case of Dr. Burgos"

==== Trese 2: Unreported Murders ====
- "Case 5: A Little Known Murder in Studio 4": Starlet Heather Evangelista was found dead in the studio of her latest movie. Trese is called in after the remains of a dead duwende is found in the crime scene.
- "Case 6: The Outpost in Kalayaan Street": A late case at the cemetery turns grim for Captain Guerrero and his colleagues when the dead rose from their graves and started attacking the nearby outpost.
- "Case 7: Embrace of the Unwanted": A couple was found dead in a mall basement parking lot, ravaged by a very small creature. The case took several turns before finding its way back to a clinic in the mall.
- "Case 8: The Association Dues of Livewell Village": A pattern of deaths is found in Livewell Village with a person electrocuted once a year, left with a sigil on their body. Trese's investigation lead her to a shady deal between the residents and a lightning elemental.

==== Trese 3: Mass Murders ====
- "Case 9: A Private Retaliation"
- "Case 10: Patient 414 in Mandaluyong"
- "Case 11: The Fort Bonifacio Massacre"
- "Case 12: The Baptism of Alexandra Trese"
- "Case 13: An Act of War"

==== Trese 4: Last Seen After Midnight ====
- "Cadena De Amor": A serial rapist is killed by a plant elemental at Luneta Park. The case opens up to reveal the whereabouts of a missing gardener.
- "A Private Collection": A manananggal falls out of the sky with its wings carefully sliced off. The incident nearly starts a gang war in the area and Trese has to find the real murderer before the situation escalates.
- "Wanted: Bedspacer": A strange illness of depression affects students living along Katipunan Avenue and Trese has to trace the source of the paranormal epidemic.
- "Fight of the Year": With an aspiring boxer nearly lured into a deal he'd be sure to regret, Trese shows him what his idol has to do to achieve his fame and success.

==== Trese 5: Midnight Tribunal ====
- "Maverick Rider"
- "The Judge's Verdict"
- "Return of the Madame"
- "The Great Stampede"

==== Trese 6: High Tide at Midnight ====
- "The Executioner's Return"
- "Casa Lanan"
- "The Plan of the Four Clans"
- "The Executioner's Squad"
- "Slaughter at Brgy. Pacifica"

==== Trese 7: Shadow Witness ====
- "Thirteen Stations" – Reprinted story from Manila Noir
- "The Exorcism of Linda Blasco"
- "Table for Three" – Originally printed as an ashcan
- "The Madrid Gig"

==== Trese 8: Shadow Agents ====
- "The Astronomer"
- "Tiger Burning Bright"
- "The Assassin"
- "The Abduction of Ernesto Clemente" – Reworking of an unfinished Trese spin-off, Bantay and the Askaleros
- "The Shadowmancer"
- "The Ballad of San Revilla" – Primarily a reworking of Talis, a komik also created by the two authors
- "The Mermaid"
- "Sunday Ritual"

=== Stories from the Diabolical ===
Budjette Tan created a blog, titled Stories from the Diabolical to share narratives that he could not put into the comic books. They would often involve "The Diabolical" and sometimes reference the main cases such as "Case 1: At the Intersection of Balete and 13th Street" and "Case 2: The Rules of the Race". Some of the stories in the blog were made in collaboration with other artists such as Mark Torres, who drew for Image Comics, and Elbert Or, creator of Bakemono High. Most of the blog posts were published in the first volume and were all illustrated by Kajo Baldisimo.

==== Trese: Stories from the Diabolical Volume 1 ====
- "One Last Drink at the Diabolical"
- "The Usual Spot"
- "The Last Full Show", was the first draft that was developed into Thirteen Stations
- "The Choir"
- "Coffee Black"

==== Stories from the Diabolical Blog ====
- "Welcome to The Diabolical", used panels from Our Secret Constellation
- "The Choir"
- "One Last Drink at the Diabolical" , illustrated by Mark Torres
- "The Usual Spot" , illustrated by Elbert Or
- "Coffee Black"
- "I Carry your Heart
- "On the first of January"
- "The Last Full Show"
- "Night of the Creeps"

=== Precinto 13 ===
Originally published as ashcans, they are currently available in the Trese blog. They were illustrated by artist Atan Talas.

- "A Domestic Disturbance" Story by Budjette Tan. Scripted by David Hontiveros and Budjette Tan
- "Premeditation"
- "Midnight Patrol"
- "Calling the Parents of a Little Girl in a Blue Dress"

=== Trese Komiks ===
These are re-released issues that have been translated into Filipino by Bob Ong with an updated colored art. They all have bonus material attached at the end.

- "Sa Kanto ng Balete Drive": case #1 At the Intersection of Balete and 13th Street
- "Mga Tuntunin ng Karera": case #2 The Rules of the Race
- "Ang Trahedya ni Dr. Burgos": case #4 The Tragic Case of Dr. Burgos

=== Trese International Editions ===
- "Trese #1 Global Edition: At the Intersection of Balete and 13th Street" (Made available in October 2018, just before the Netflix adaptation announcement, for the backers of the Indiegogo campaign), retconned Alexandra's usage of a keypad mobile phone and fax machine
- "Trese #1: At the Intersection of Balete and 13th Street (Anniversary Edition)" (In celebration of Trese's 14th Anniversary, "Trese #1 Global Edition: At the Intersection of Balete and 13th Street" was reprinted as an ashcan on 2019, similar to the original ashcan issue, exclusively sold by Comic Odyssey and Filbar's)
- "Trese: Murder on Balete Drive" (Published by Ablaze Comics, the book is an updated US edition of Book 1, featuring redrawn artwork, additional pages as well as pieces of annotated material taken from various books such as the Trese Global Edition and Trese: Book of Murders. It has a variant cover exclusive from Comic Odyssey and Sanctum Sanctorum Comics that was limited to 300 pieces.)
- Trese 2: Unreported Murders (Published by Ablaze Comics, the book is an updated US edition of Book 2)

=== Trese Lite ===
- "Trese Lite Postcard Book Vol. 1" (It was launched at the newly made komik store "Secret HQ" and had a panel and autograph signing with creators Budjette Tan, Kajo Baldisimo and Iunctura writer David Hontiveros and artist Marvin Del Mundo. It's the first book published under Avenida Books publishing.)

=== Trese Bloodlines ===
- "Trese: Bloodlines Volume 1", the first installment in an anthology of Trese comic stories from David Hontiveros, John Amor, Brian Balondo, Mark Gatela, Marvin del Mundo, Brandie Tan, Jb Tapia and a new story from Budjette Tan and Kajo Baldisimo. The book was released in December 2020. The stories are listed as follows:
  - "The Visions of Miranda Trese"
  - "Takutan: A Verdugo Mission"
  - "That Kind of Hunger: a Fr. Matthias Trese case"
  - "Iunctura: a Fr. Trese and Dakila deviation story"
  - "Personal Demons: an Alexandra Trese and Detective Andara deviation story"

=== Trese shorts ===
Numerous standalone comic shorts have been mostly written by Budjette Tan (with two notable exceptions) that are set in the Trese universe. They are usually illustrated by a host of different illustrators including Kajo Baldisimo. The Trese moniker is often placed at the start of the story's title to indicate its setting in the Trese universe. Sometimes, the connection is more subtle, such as when characters from the main Trese series appear in stories such as Songs of the Lewenri or when events from the main books are directly referenced in stories like The Clinic.

- "Trese: The Devil's Playground", art by Melvin Arciaga and story by Budjette Tan (Released online in 2009)
- "Trese: Masquerade", illustrated by Mark Torres and written by Budjette Tan (Appeared in the October 2009 issue of Rogue Magazine)
- "The Clinic", illustrated by Kajo Baldisimo and written by Budjette Tan (Appeared in the 2009 graphic anthology Underpass). The story's connection to the Trese universe is revealed via the appearance of ABC-ZNN as well as when the main character references the events of the story Embrace of the Unwanted, referencing Robertson Mall by name.
- "Songs of the Lewenri: Farewell to Pain" (Published in 2010 for Free Comic Book Day)
- "The Last Full Show" (Appeared in the 2011 anthology book "Alternative Alamat", in a July 2012 post in the "Stories from the Diabolical" blog, and in the "Trese: Stories from the Diabolical Volume 1" in 2013 with an updated art)
- "Thirteen Stations" (Appeared in the 2013 publication of Manila Noir, Abangan: The Best of Philippine Komiks, and reprinted in Trese 7: Shadow Witness in 2019)
- "Trese: Engkanto in the City" (Appeared in the May 4, 2013 edition of the Philippine Daily Inquirer)
- "Trese: Table for Three" (Published in October 2016 as an ashcan and then appeared in Trese 7: Shadow Witness).
- "Kambal: The Elegant Skull", illustrated by Ian Sta. Maria and written by Budjette Tan (Appeared in the October 2017 issue of Kommunity magazine)
- "Trese Deviations: Iunctura, illustrated by Marvin Del Mundo and written by David Hontiveros. (Released in the 2019 November Komikon event)
- "Trese Presents: Verdugo Takutan", written and illustrated by J.B. Tapia. This is the second Trese story not written by Budjette. It was released online weekly for free during the imposed quarantine in the Philippines. It was later released as part of a book called Trese Presents: Verdugo.
- "The Siren's Executioner", written by Budjette Tan and Illustrated by Kajo Baldisimo.

=== Books and Stories in production ===
- Trese: Bloodlines Volume 2, the second installment in the anthology series. This book will be released in 2021 and will be based upon stories solicited from readers.
- Trese 9
- Trese 10
- Trese 11
- Trese 12
- Trese 13
- "Bantay and the Askaleros", a spinoff focusing on the character Bantay and his Askaleros. A preview was given out as a freebie during the Free Comic Book Day 2015. The characters appeared a year later in a story from the Stories from the Diabolical blog. The story is set to appear in the upcoming Trese: Shadow Agents book.
- "Trese Occult Case #2", the Global Edition of Case 2: The Rules of the Race. It was dubbed as the Anniversary Ashcan issue # 2.
- Untitled Trese Deviations books
- Fr. Matt solo stories
- The Art of Trese
- Halimaw, written and illustrated by JB Tapia and edited by Budjette Tan

== Graphic novels ==
- Book 1 – Trese: Murder on Balete Drive
- Book 2 – Trese: Unreported Murders
- Book 3 – Trese: Mass Murders
- Book 4 – Trese: Last Seen After Midnight
- Book 5 – Trese: Midnight Tribunal
- Book 6 – Trese: High Tide at Midnight
- Book 7 – Trese: Shadow Witness
- Book 8 – Trese: Shadow Agents
- Volume 1 – Trese: Stories From the Diabolical
- Volume 1 – Trese: Book of Murders (Compilation of books 1–3 with updated artwork plus additional annotated material and was only limited to 1,000 copies, making them rare)
- Volume 1 – Trese: Murder on Balete Drive (Published by Ablaze Comics)
- Volume 2 – Trese: Unreported Murders (Published by Ablaze Comics)
- Volume 3 – Trese: Mass Murders (Published by Ablaze Comics)
- Volume 4 – Trese: Last Seen After Midnight (Published by Ablaze Comics)
- Volume 5 – Trese: Midnight Tribunal (Published by Ablaze Comics)
- Volume 6 – Trese: High Tide at Midnight (Published by Ablaze Comics)

== Crossovers ==
=== Skyworld ===
Written by Mervin Ignacio, and illustrated by Ian Sta. Maria, Skyworld was set in an alternate universe, where Alexandra Trese and the Kambal act as some of the main characters that aid the main protagonist, Andoy. The single issues 1-3 were released at local conventions. Volumes 1 and 2 serve as compilations of these issues together with issue 4. They were published by National Bookstore Publishing.

==== Volume 1 ====
- Skyworld: Apocrypha
- Skyworld: Testament

Every legend hides a lie. A murdered Skygod re-emerges in modern-day Manila. A Tikbalang prince plots vengeance for the death of his father. And the Queen of the Asuang unleashes the mythical Bakunawa upon the streets of the city. Caught in their age-old struggle is Andoy. a crippled orphan that discovers he is the fulfillment of a prophecy dating back to Lapu-Lapu himself.

==== Volume 2 ====
- Skyworld: Prodigal
- Skyworld: Requiem

Every legend hides a lie. The Queen of the Asuang and her legion have taken over the country. Alexandra Trese leads the resistance alongside Makabo, a Tikbalang warrior, and Kaio, the Duwende trickster. Trapped in their epic battle is Andoy, a teenage boy tasked with uniting an army of Tikbalang, Enkanto, Kapre and Duwende against the Asuang. But before he can lead them, he must first recover a mystical sword that was once part of the fabled Yamashita Treasure.

==== Volume 3 ====
This will be the last book in the series and is still under development, with the release slated for 2020.

===== Prequel =====
- Skyworld: Dominion

Set after the events of Skyworld: Requiem, Andoy, currently called "Maharlika", now rules over a country in rebuild. A free version was released during the Philippine Independence Day 2017. Originally it was titled Martial Law.

=== Ambush ===
Ambush is a continuing strip created by Andrew Villar and published daily in the Philippine Daily Inquirer. The story follows Amber Gonzales, also known as Ambush, who starts her job as an agent at a very young age. A variant cover with Trese paid homage to Uncanny X-Men #173 .

Several crossovers have involved Trese, some of which have been titled Trese: Ambush. A story published for the 2012 Free Comic Book Day Komiks anthology notably had Trese writer Budjette Tan write the script while Andrew Villar illustrated the comic. Other sample crossovers between the two include:

==== Plot ====
When a big fiery dog razes a village, the bravo company discovers the paranormal is involved. Trese, the Kambal, and a former agent help, but not without a huge sacrifice that would change their lives.

=== A Night At The Museum ===
In honor of Batman Day 2016, Kajo and Budjette released online a non-canon story about Trese, Batman, and Wolverine teaming up to fight The Hand and Aswangs. It was left without a conclusion. The last 2 missing pages were published in an ashcan titled, "Mga Drawing Ni Kajo #6" (The Drawings of Kajo). As part of the celebration for BatCon 2019, physical copies for the completed comic with an exclusive cover were released for the first 100 ticket buyers and included as a raffle for attendees. On March 24, 2020 (during the COVID-19 pandemic), the complete comic was released in the official Trese blog.

=== Trese Deviations: Iunctura ===
Written by David Hontiveros and illustrated by Marvin Del Mundo, the story is a crossover team-up between Fr. Mattias Trese and Dakila. It was a story canon to 'The Verse' universe by David Hontiveros. This was used as a way of featuring his character Dakila and the organization TierCell. This is said to be the first story from the Trese Deviations title.

=== Other appearances ===
With the blessing of its creators, Alexandra Trese and the Kambals appeared in Kanto Inc (issue #3) and in a comic strip of Callous. Parody versions also appeared in Beerkada comics.

== Adaptations ==
The creators attempted to make a 10-minute long short film in 2010 but found it costly to produce. According to the afterword of Trese 4: Last Seen After Midnight, the script was reused for the story "A Private Collection". There have been talks to adapt the series by Filipino studios and networks. Glaiza de Castro was a fan favorite for the role and even showed interest. A thesis short film was made by students but was only screened privately due to the creators having signed a contract with a potential film producer.

On November 8, 2018, media-services provider Netflix announced at their "See What's Next Asia" event Marina Bay Sands in Singapore that they would air an anime-influenced web television series adaptation of Trese as part of their upcoming 'anime' lineup. The animated series would be produced by BASE Entertainment with Jay Oliva as the executive producer. During the Trese Lite Vol. 1 launch, Budjette said that Filipino voice actors were used for the television series. In October 27, Netflix released the first look for the series, and set its release date for 2021. On March 7, 2021, Netflix announced that Liza Soberano would voice for the Tagalog dub for the main character Alexandra Trese, with Shay Mitchell voice acting for the English dub. The series was released on June 11, 2021.

== Merchandise ==
Due to its popularity, the creators sold limited amounts of shirts while several licensed shirts were produced by Art Initiative, Evil Genius Clothing Co., and Team Manila. Dolls of Trese, Crispin, and Basilio were made by Studio-Kaiba in 2012. During Komikon 2017, The Keybie Cafe sold keychains of the characters while Visprint sold refrigerator magnets. In honor of the 13th anniversary of Trese, Hidden Fortress produced Trese and the Kambal 3.75" tall resin figures limited to 30 sets and was exclusively released for ToyCon PH 2018.

In 2016, Balangay Entertainment announced Trese Case Files: War and Chaos, a cooperative board game for 1–5 players. Players would play as the characters from Trese as they protect Manila from villains from the comic and would need to work together to investigate cases, defeat monsters, gain favors, and thwart the mastermind's diabolical scheme. Development stopped the following year in favor of other projects.

In November 2021, two variants of Alexandra Trese's Funko Pops were made exclusively available at Filbar's, these are: a regular colored one and a limited edition black and white Chase figure that can only be purchased together in a bundle of six Trese Funko Pops.

== See also ==
- Philippine comics
- Budjette Tan
- Bob Ong
- Elmer (comics)
- Mythology Class
- Leinil Francis Yu
