= Lumayo Ka Nga sa Akin =

2011 series of novels by Bob Ong

- First edition
- Author: Bob Ong
- Language: Tagalog; English
- Genre: Comedy; Romance
- Publisher: Visprint, Inc. (formerly Visual Print Enterprises Inc.)
- Publication date: 2011
- Publication place: Philippines
- Media type: Print (Paperback)
- Pages: 186
- ISBN: 971-0545-09-4
- Preceded by: Ang mga Kaibigan ni Mama Susan
- Followed by: Si (book)

Lumayo Ka Nga sa Akin (Get Away from Me) is a series of satirical parody novels by Filipino writer Bob Ong, published in 2011 by Visprint Inc. The book, which was written in a screenplay form, is divided into three parts.

In a 2016 interview with The Philippine Star, Ong explained that the book is "basically all about the ills of mass media that you wish would change. It's mainly about, but not limited to, Pinoy movies. It's the insanity and absurdity of our lives, our concept of entertainment, misplaced values, commercialism, and thoughtless existence as reflected through our abuse of art. It is laughable, but more deplorable".

== Synopsis ==
The book is divided into three "short films", each one pokes fun to a particular genre.

=== Bala sa Bala, Kamao sa Kamao, Satsat sa Satsat ===
The first film in the trilogy centers around Diego, an action star who wants to take revenge against a group of bad guys, also known as "Bandidos" (bandits), after they killed his parents, his wife, Ashley, and everyone who attended their wedding, just a few moments right after they get married at the beginning of the film. As the story unfolds, Diego, being an action star, gets into misadventures and finds himself in trouble-after-trouble. Unfortunately, Divina Tuazon, a famous actress and Diego's new found leading lady, was kidnapped by the Bandidos. Finally, in an abandoned warehouse (a setting where most of Pinoy action films' final scenes takes place), Diego tries to save Divina from the evil hands of Bandidos's merciless and heartless leader named "Bos".

The plot generally follows themes from classic Filipino action movies, as well as comedy films from the early 1980s to 1990s. For example, Diego's sidekicks, Dodoy and Momoy uses slapstick from time to time, a type of comedy which was very popular in the country for the past decades.

=== Shake, Shaker, Shakest ===
A middle-class family was forced to enter and stay in a white haunted house for several days after being stranded in an unfamiliar place. The title is a play on the Shake, Rattle & Roll film series, and the plot is a ludicrous horror film.

=== Asawa ni Marie ===
A rags-to-riches story about Marie, a poor girl who has a confusing status in life and love. The plot is similar to Philippine dramas and soap operas, particularly Marimar.

== Reception ==
"The book is designed to read like a screenplay that stitches together almost every imaginable cliché to sum up everything we should detest about Philippine entertainment but we nevertheless chug up and support. It is supposedly written as the influential author’s critique on commercialist media. ", wrote Oggs Cruz for Rappler. Mino Deocareza found that the book "trie[d] to trace how the media negatively affects lives particularly of the younger generation."

== Film adaptation ==
A film adaptation (with the same title) was releasedunder Viva Films on January 13, 2016.
