= Zsazsa Zaturnnah (film) =

- Teaser poster
- Directed by: Avid Liongoren
- Written by: Avid Liongoren; Carlo Vergara
- Story by: Carlo Vergara
- Based on: Zsazsa Zaturnnah by Carlo Vergara
- Produced by: Avid Liongoren; Hannah Liongoren; Franck Priot
- Production companies: CreaZion Studios; Ghosts City Films; Rocketsheep Studio
- Distributed by: Nathan Studios
- Release date: June 22, 2026 (Annecy)
- Running time: 80 minutes
- Countries: Philippines; France
- Language: English
- Budget: ~$1.05 million

Zsazsa Zaturnnah (subtitled vs. the Amazonistas of Planet X) is a 2026 English-language adult animated superhero romantic comedy film directed and co-produced by Avid Liongoren, from a screenplay he co-wrote with Carlo Vergara, who also wrote the story based on a komik Zsazsa Zaturnnah.

The film follows a small-town shy and meek gay beautician named Ada who discovers a meteorite from outer space which gives him the ability to turn into a voluptuous, flamboyant superheroine under his identity "Zsazsa Zaturnnah".

An international co-production between the Philippines and France, Zsazsa Zaturnnah had its world premiere out of competition at the Midnight section in 2026 of the Annecy International Animation Film Festival.

== Premise ==
Meet Ada, a shy, gay beautician in a small town in the Philippines. After too many heartbreaks, Ada resigns himself to a single life but when a magical meteorite from outer space gives him the ability to turn into the flamboyant female superhero Zsazsa Zaturnnah, Ada must fight the evil alien Amazonistas and face the even more difficult challenge of learning to love again.

== Cast ==
- Phi Palmos as Adrian "Ada", a small-town shy, gay beautician.
  - Adrienne Vergara as Zsazsa Zaturnnah, Ada's feminine counterpart.
- Io Balanon as Didi, Ada's roommate.
- Sig Pecho as Dodong, a muscular yet cowardly man and Ada's love interest.
- Joelle Yuvienco as Queen Feminah Suarestellar Baroux, a leader of the Amazonistas and Ada's archenemy.

== Production ==
=== Development ===
In June 2019, a teaser for the animated Zsa Zsa Zaturnnah was posted at Facebook by Rocketsheep Studio, the same animation production company that made Saving Sally. Zaturnnah's creator, Vergara, himself penned the screenplay after he wrote a spec script to adapt the story into an animated feature. Vergara, however, originally expected to develop an animated television series based on the character but when he was approached by Liongoren to do a new full-length film, he accepted it, although he was initially hesitant about making another film for Zsazsa Zaturnnah.

=== Pre-production ===
Over six years of production, the film received support from the ICOF Fund, targeting co-productions and backed by Filipino state agency FDCP with ₱10,000,000 pesos provided. The film spent almost 4 years in development but, due to the animation process, needs to raise an additional $40,000 (₱2.3 million) to finish the film within two years through a Kickstarter campaign, which successfully raised $49,773 with 508 backers.

Due to a lengthy production and slow animation process with spend more than 6 years of development, it is projected to be complete in 2026 after the campaign has already been funded.

=== Animation ===
Animation services were provided by Friendly Foes, Heson Studio, Rocketsheep Studio, Shockwave Animation, Studio Corvus, and Studio Diwa.

=== Distribution ===
According to Variety, the film is stated to premiere at film festivals in 2024 such as Cannes and Toronto with UK-based independent production company SC Films International acquired North American and international distribution rights, with Simon Crowe served as an executive producer, while Nathan Studios acquired Philippine rights.

== Release ==
An unfinished version of the film was initially presented at the 2025 Annecy International Animation Film Festival, with Phi Palmos was cast as the main character, who reprised his role from the musical theater production, while the remaining cast members were unveiled including Adrienne Vergara, Io Balanon, Sig Pecho and Joelle Yuvienco.

== Reception ==
At the 30th Fantasia International Film Festival, the film won the Bronze Audience Award for animated films.

== See also ==
- List of films with longest production time
- Adult animation in the Philippines
