= Baldisimo =

Baldisimo is a surname. Notable people with the surname include:

- Kajo Baldisimo, Filipino comic book artist
- Matthew Baldisimo (born 1998), Filipino-Canadian soccer player
- Michael Baldisimo (born 2000), Filipino-Canadian soccer player, brother of Matthew
