= Alamat ng Gubat =

Book by Bob Ong

- Author: Bob Ong
- Illustrator: Klaro
- Language: Tagalog
- Genre: Humor, Filipino culture
- Publisher: Visual Print Enterprises
- Publication date: 2003
- Publication place: Philippines
- Media type: Print (paperback)
- Pages: 93
- ISBN: 971-92574-1-5
- OCLC: 82243283

Alamat ng Gubat (Legend of the Forest) is the fourth book published in 2003 by Bob Ong, a Filipino contemporary author noted for using conversational Filipino to create humorous and reflective depictions of life as a Filipino. Among Bob Ong's works, it is notable for being the first one to be a self-contained straightforward narrative rather than a collection of anecdotes. Bob Ong later came up with another book written as a straightforward narrative, MacArthur, but it is a very different work because it does not have Bob Ong's signature humorous tone.

The story is about a little crab named "Tong" searching for a banana heart to cure his father from sickness. While he begins his journey, he finds friends. He and his friends also fight the evil animals in the forest.

Alamat ng Gubat is notable for its allegorical references to Philippine society.

== Main characters ==
- Tong - the main protagonist of the story. Tong is a small crab (talangka) who went to look for a banana blossom (heart of a banana) in the forest to cure his sickly father, Haring Talangka (translates to King Crab in English). He is engaged to a fish named Dalagang Bukid. Tong is pinkish red and is the youngest in the cast of their crab family. Tong also has a brother called Katang who planned to take revenge on him at the middle of the story. His name is derived from the Visayan nursery rhyme Tong Tong Tong Pakitong-kitong, which is about crabs.
- Pagong - a tortoise who is helping Tong in his adventure. He amazes Tong with his collection of turtle eggs.
- Aso - a wild dog. He is a lost dog living in a forest (which he likes). He also helps Tong to find the banana heart. Aso has a spot on his left eye and is a little confused with everything he says. He also likes playing.
- Kuneho - is mostly described as a Filipino version of Rabbit. He also joins Tong in his adventure in finding the banana heart. Kuneho is a little demanding on everything he says and is always a little angry. He is tall and gray.
- Buwaya - a crocodile who at the end, eats Tong's friends. He announces Tong as his "best friend". But Tong doesn't agree. Buwaya joins an evil gang in the forest which includes Leon, the gang leader, Daga, and Maya, a small bird, who is also Buwaya's sidekick and whose main job is to clean Buwaya's teeth.
- Daga - a rat living in the woods of Saging Republic. He is the tiny sidekick of Leon. Leon influenced Daga to roar like lions. Daga is part of the gang of evil animals in the forest.
- Leon - a lion and is the leader and the founder of the evil packed gang. He influenced Tong's brother, Katang, in joining the evil gang of animals in the forest. Now, his gang is an obstacle to Tong's journey in finding the banana heart and saving his beloved father.
- Maya - a sparrow which has his own mystery in the book : Good or Evil. Still, even at the end of the book, no one knows what side is he. He is Buwaya's sidekick but since his job is to clean Buwaya's teeth, he always ends up being eaten by the reptile although he manages to escape just in time.
- Katang - the brother of Tong who decided to join the gang because of Tong. He is planning revenge on Tong because Tong tricked him that getting defecated by an Adarna bird is good for his asthma. He sold Tong to Leon and Buwaya and became a part of the gang. But at the end, he got squashed by a bamboo stick.

== Plot ==
Tong, with the help of his friends was finding the banana heart in the forest. When Langgam won as the new leader of the forest, he got squashed by an animal. They were also being threatened by a gang of evil animals. So Tong, Pagong, Aso and Kuneho fought for the forest and planned to save Tong's father. But when Tong's friends were eaten by Buwaya, Tong eventually got the banana heart with the help of an annoying but wise monkey. He has also not harmed the forest but saved it and made it a better place to live in. But of course, no one still knows what has happened to Leon and his gang.
