= Kapitan Sino =

2009 novel by Bob Ong

- Paperback book cover
- Author: Bob Ong
- Language: Tagalog
- Genre: Novel
- Publisher: Visual Print Enterprises
- Publication date: 2009
- Publication place: Philippines
- Media type: Print (Paperback)
- Pages: 166
- ISBN: 971-0545-01-9
- OCLC: 430858881
- Preceded by: Macarthur
- Followed by: Ang mga Kaibigan ni Mama Susan

Kapitan Sino (English: Captain Who) is a 2009 novel by a Filipino author under the pseudonym Bob Ong. The story revolves around Rogelio Manglicmot, an electrician in the small barrio of Pelaez.

== Plot ==
Kapitan Sino is a fictional story by Bob Ong about Rogelio Manglicmot, an average Electronics Technician in a town called Pelaez who became a Super Hero after learning his special abilities. With the help of his best friend Bok-bok and his childhood friend Tessa (whom he also bears romantic feelings), he treads the path of saving lives and offering help to those in need. After some confusion of what to call the mysterious crime fighter, the people decided to call him "Kapitan Sino" (translated as Captain Who?). Kapitan Sino then starts his adventures as he goes one on one with a giant gorilla, saves people trapped inside a burning building, prevents structures from collapsing during an earthquake, stops a train from going off rail and caught small fry criminals faster than the local authorities.

As the story progresses, a series of abduction occurs in Pelaez by a mysterious Hairy Monster. It was later revealed that the same Monster is Mayor Solomon Suico who abducts victims for their blood to sustain his son, Michael, who inherited his form however with more severity. Kapitan Sino engages in a fierce battle with Mayor Suico after he followed him to an abandoned hospital where he keeps his victims. Kapitan Sino defeats Mayor Suico and kills him; Suico's son, Michael, soon follows after being injured in the rubbles made by the battle. Kapitan Sino searches the abandoned hospital for Suico's latest victim. He finds Tessa instead, unconscious and bleeding. He rushes her to the nearest hospital, Tessa however dies.

After the death of Tessa, Rogelio loses enthusiasm towards life and goes full time super hero. His father Mang Ernesto confronts him telling him that it was not his fault he could not save Tessa and to stop being a super hero if he is not happy. He also confesses himself as Mayor Suico's half brother. Mang Ernesto tried to make Rogelio realize that being a hero does not need recognition but acts as one to make things right.

Following the death of Mayor Suico, the Vice Mayor Samonte took the vacant position as Mayor of Pelaez. Mayor Samonte then organizes a program to thank Kapitan Sino giving a token of appreciation, a check supposedly worth 50 thousand Philippine pesos (in which most of the sources he already took for himself from public fund [hence, in reality, leaving only 30,000 pesos left to claim). At the sound of such huge amount, one by one, false Kapitan Sinos began to appear wearing phony Kapitan Sino costumes from old motorcycle helmets. The people went amok and one of them threatened to throw grenade. The grenade fell as everyone fled for their lives, Rogelio (wearing Kapitan Sino costume) rushed and covered the explosion, tearing his costume and burning his helmet, revealing himself as the true Kapitan Sino. The Police arrives to control the situation, Aling Chummy seemingly lost her sanity approaches Rogelio (who can't barely stand and is assisted by Bok-bok) and slaps him. He blames Rogelio for the death of his husband who died of lung cancer, and asserts that Rogelio is at fault for not warning him. The police arrests Rogelio and Bok-bok, but leaves the man who threw the grenade free.

Meanwhile, a Mysterious Disease threatens the whole world. The epidemic finally reaches Philippines making the citizen anxious for their lives. To find a cure, doctors from all over the world decided to get samples of blood from everywhere to match the cure they are developing. Rogelio and Bok-bok (imprisoned) were also forced to give samples of their blood. Rogelio's blood matches the cure and is taken by the Medical Expert for his blood, leaving Bok-bok behind already infected with the disease. After taking much of his blood, Rogelio (now all weak and dizzy) tried to find his parents. An unknown man carrying a child slips from the panicking crowd and rushes to Rogelio asking him if his blood cures, Rogelio nods as the man stabs him to get his blood. Rogelio dies as well as his parents who were infected by the disease.

Following the death of Rogelio, Bok-bok attends another program held in his honor. During Mayor Samonte's speech of his false service instead of honoring Kapitan Sino, Bok-bok approaches him and strikes him on the face.

The story ends with Bok-bok, saved from the mysterious disease, relives Kapitan Sino's legacy in himself.

== Characters ==
- Rogelio Manglicmot/Kapitan Sino: Rogelio Manglicmot is the main protagonist of the story. Rogelio is a capable electronics technician who lives in a small town called Pelaez. Though he was described in the story as an average Filipino male, Rogelio possesses incredible strength and seems to have an effect to electricity. With the support of Bok-bok, his best friend and Teng a.k.a. Tessa, his childhood friend, he decided to use his ability to help people. Tessa being excited about the birth of the super hero made his costume using old clothes from her aunt who lives abroad. Rogelio's costume as a super hero is a silver and gray body suit with gloves partnered by an old black Converse Chuck Taylor sneakers. His face is hidden by his weird and funny helmet with red eyes that looks like two big tomatoes with small nose and mouth clearly not proportional to the eyes (apparently would somewhat look like "Masked Rider" from Japan) and also equipped by high frequency hearing device and clear vision lens that only works on Rogelio because of his electric ability. After some of his heroic deeds as a masked crusader, the people decided to name him as "Kapitan Sino" (translated as "Captain Who?" in English), after some confusion by the bystanders. It was later revealed that Mayor Suico was actually his uncle and, like his uncle, his father also has special abilities. Aside from his super natural abilities, Rogelio's blood also had the ability to cure the "Mysterious disease" that threatened the whole world. Rogelio dies after an unknown man breaks in from the crowd and stabs him in hope of curing his child with the blood from Rogelio.
- Bok-bok: Bok-bok is the best friend of Rogelio Manglicmot. He is described as a fat guy with an incredible sense of humor, which always annoys Rogelio. Though Rogelio treats him as a pest, Bok-bok has always been welcomed as family by the Manglicmot. Bok-bok is an orphan who lives with his aunt, which is why he is always at Rogelio's place. Surprisingly enough that it was Bok-bok's persuasion that led to Rogelio's decision in becoming a Super Hero as Bok-bok reasons that Rogelio has the ability that exceeds others and that it should be used as part of his responsibility for having such gift. It was also during his discussion with Rogelio when the super hero made his first appearance as a Topless Ninja (Ninjang Hubad) when he caught and put at the top of the Church a thief who stole a watermelon. It was also told in the story that he had been childhood friends with Rogelio and Teresa (also known as Teng or Tessa). Bok-bok is also one of the lives Rogelio saved when he sacrificed his blood in making the cure for the "Mysterious disease". Rogelio's memories and legacy was left in Bok-bok after his death.
- Teresa (known in the story asTeng/Tessa): Tessa is a childhood friend of Rogelio and Bok-bok. Tessa is blind, however is surprisingly known as a good dress maker. Tessa is often described as a beautiful young lady having small face, long black hair and short stature. During his conversation with Rogelio at the roof of Sto. Domingo Church, she believes that love is not about how the person looks but of what is inside. She also tells Rogelio that her being blind is a blessing for her, because she sees the real person instead of the outer appearance. It is clearly implied that Rogelio bears a deep romantic affection towards the young lady. Teresa's feelings for Rogelio, remains unclear however. It was later revealed that it was Tessa, not some child, who was abducted by Mayor Suico for blood transfusion which will be used to sustain Michael's Life. She dies by blood loss after Kapitan Sino rescues her from the abandoned hospital. It was also stated in the story that part of the reason for Tessa's death was the lack of cotton balls, there was no doctor and other petty things which if by any chance people made efforts could have saved her life.
- Mang Ernesto: Mang Ernesto is Rogelio's father. It was stated that once, he was a strong man until his sickness which led to him being unable to work. He is always in a bad mood most probably because of his frustration. It was revealed that he had the same ability as Rogelio in which he however did not use. This is the reason why he believes that his disability was the price he had to pay for running away from the responsibility. He also confesses that Mayor Suico (the hairy monster) is his half brother. He dies along with his wife "Aling Hasmin" after being infected by the Mysterious disease.
- Aling Hasmin: Aling Hasmin is Rogelio's mother. She is described as a cheerful, supportive and loving mother and wife. She takes care of Mang Ernesto along with doing laundry for other households. She also possess a great amount of patience towards her grumpy husband as she remains smiling at times when Mang Ernesto is in a very bad mood. She dies along with Mang Ernesto inside their home as she was also infected with the Mysterious Disease.
- Mayor Solomon Suico: Solomon Suico is Pelaez's Mayor. He is described in the story as a kind hearted man. He offered a ride in his car for the pregnant Aling Baby, gave a brand new sewing machine to his driver's wife and helped a certain family in supporting the hospitalization of a child with Hydrocephalous. He doesn't want to be treated as someone different as he wants himself to be called by his nickname "Omeng" instead of Mayor Suico. It was revealed in the story that he is the Hairy Monster that abducts the people of Pelaez and his kindness serves as an atonement. His abduction is a way to support the life of his son "Michael" who is also a "different kind". He transfuses the blood of the victims in order to keep Michael alive. Unfortunately after abducting Tessa, he engages with a fierce battle with Kapitan Sino inside an abandoned hospital and is defeated. He is revealed to be Kapitan Sino's uncle, a half brother of Mang Ernesto
- Michael: Michael is Mayor Solomon Suico's only son. He is described as a deformed human with a figure resembling a hairy whale. He is sustained by the blood of his father's victims. He dies along with his father after being injured by rubbles during his father's encounter with Kapitan Sino.

Minor Characters

- Aling Chummy: Aling Chummy was known for being a kindhearted person in the town of Palaez. She later lost her sanity after Rogelio is revealed to be Kapitan Sino. She blames Kapitan Sino for the death of her husband who died years ago due to lung cancer as she accuses Kapitan Sino did not warn her husband for his excessive smoking. Thus imprisoning Kapitan Sino by the police.
- Aling Baby: Aling Baby is described as a short, dark and curly haired woman married to a seaman "Mang Boy". Apparently, after her husband brought little comfort, she began to live a social climber life as she forces her children to call her "Mommy" instead of the traditional "Nanay" (which means Mother for poor or middle class family). She is always in a contest with Aling Precious about who is more well-off in life, who has better children, who has the latest appliances and who had the most contribution for the Barangay projects that was never even initiated.
- Aling Precious: Aling Precious is the neighbor of the Manglicmots. She is often depicted carrying a broom stick she uses to broom rubbish towards her neighbors lawns as she likes to keep her own front lawn clean. Her rival, Aling Baby is seen by her neighbors as her closest friend, which both of them hypocritically portrays.
