= Lumayo Ka Nga sa Akin (film) =

2016 Filipino comedy anthology film

- Directed by: Chris Martinez (segment "Asawa ni Marie"); Mark Meily (segment "Bala sa bala, kamao sa kamao, satsat sa satsat"); Andoy Ranay (segment "Shake, Shaker, Shakest")
- Screenplay by: Bob Ong; Eric Cabahug
- Based on: Lumayo Ka Nga Sa Akin by Bob Ong
- Produced by: Vic del Rosario Jr.; Harlene Bautista
- Starring: Maricel Soriano; Herbert Bautista; Cristine Reyes; Candy Pangilinan; Benjie Paras
- Cinematography: Nor Domingo; Gary L. Gardoce; Lee Briones-Meily
- Edited by: Vanessa De Leon; Steve Erana; Carlo Francisco Manatad
- Music by: Teresa Barrozo
- Production companies: Viva Films; Heaven's Best Entertainment
- Distributed by: Viva Films
- Release date: January 13, 2016
- Running time: 129 minutes
- Country: Philippines
- Languages: Filipino; English

Lumayo Ka Nga sa Akin (lit. 'Get Away From Me') is a 2016 Filipino satirical comedy anthology film based on Bob Ong's 2011 book of the same name. It was directed by Mark Meily, Andoy Ranay and Chris Martinez starring Cristine Reyes, Maricel Soriano, Herbert Bautista, Antoinette Taus, Paolo Ballesteros, Jason Gainza, Candy Pangilinan, Benjie Paras and Shy Carlos. It was released on January 13, 2016.

The film parodies mainstream Filipino movies and television shows, as well as popular culture, while tackling several national issues at the same time.

== Synopsis ==
=== Bala Sa Bala, Kamao Sa Kamao, Satsat Sa Satsat ===
The first film in the trilogy centers around Diego, an action star who wants to take revenge against a group of bad guys, also known as "Bandidos" (bandits), after they killed his parents, his wife, Ashley, and everyone who attended their wedding, just a few moments right after they get married at the beginning of the film. As the story unfolds, Diego, being an action star, gets into misadventures and finds himself in trouble-after-trouble. Unfortunately, Divina Tuazon, a famous actress and Diego's new found leading lady, was kidnapped by the Bandidos. Finally, in an abandoned warehouse (a setting where most of Pinoy action films' final scenes takes place), Diego unsuccessfully tries to save Divina from the evil hands of Bandido's merciless and heartless leader named "Bos".

The plot generally follows themes from classic Filipino action movies, as well as comedy films from early 80's to 90's. For example, Diego's sidekicks, Dodoy and Momoy uses slapstick from time to time, a type of comedy which was very popular in the country for the past decades.

=== Shake, Shaker, Shakest ===
A middle-class family was forced to enter and stay in a white haunted house for several days after being stranded in an unfamiliar place after an old lady suddenly appeared in front of the car. The old lady was added in the story so that they have a reason to enter the haunted house. They are greeted by Bollywood dance production that ask them to find the possessed object before the next full moon, it starts with letter C and ends with letter R. An Indian caretaker was added to introduce fresh ideas on horror movie, but audience usually do not like fresh ideas. The family realizes that the ghost behind the hauntings is that of a prospective author whom they rejected in their bookstore business as they thought his ideas were unbefitting of their reputation. The title is play on the Shake, Rattle & Roll film series and the plot is a ludicrous horror film.

=== Asawa ni Marie ===
A rags-to-riches story about Marie, a poor girl who has a confusing status in life and love while she and her family is abused by a rich landowner and is the eye of the landowner's two sons. After being presumably drowned by a rival for love, she returns after three years as a rich person who works at the former landowner's firm and resumes her relationship with the two heirs. Her old rival tries to stop them but is injured in ridiculous situations before finally receiving the "ultimate injury" of losing her acting career. The movie ends with Marie undecided about which heir to marry. The plot is similar to Philippine dramas/soap operas, particularly Marimar and brands from commercial.

== Cast ==
=== Bala sa Bala, Kamao sa Kamao, Satsat sa Satsat ===
- Benjie Paras as Diego
- Candy Pangilinan as Divina Tuazon
- Bearwin Meily
- Rez Cortez as Bos
- Roxanne Barcelo as Joleena Ann Baretto

=== Shake, Shaker, Shakest ===
- Maricel Soriano as Cora Catacutan
- Herbert Bautista as Carlos Catacutan
- Shy Carlos as Aby Catacutan
- Andrew Muhlach as Mar Catacutan
- JM Ibañez as Samuel Catacutan
- Ryan Eigenmann as Pundit

=== Asawa ni Marie ===
- Cristine Reyes as Marie/Mharilyn
- Antoinette Taus as Señorita Avila
- Paolo Ballesteros as Señorito Boglee Ginintuan
- Jason Gainza as Señorito Lapid
- Jackie Lou Blanco as Señorita Onor
- Joey Paras as Aling Minda
- Sam Y.G. as the voice of Yagit
- Jaime Fabregas as Priest
- Donnalyn Bartolome as herself
- Mark Bautista as himself
- Louise Bolton as herself

== Production ==
In 2012, Viva Films was able to acquire the rights to two of Bob Ong's books, ABNKKBSNPLAko and his other book Lumayo Ka Nga Sa Akin. Ong himself was never present during negotiations and only exchanged emails with VIVA. Anne Curtis was originally to play Señorita Avila but replaced by Antoinette Taus.

== Release ==
Lumayo Ka Nga Sa Akin premiered on January 11, 2016, at SM Megamall. It then opened in other cinemas two days later. It was Viva Films' first movie of 2016. It was also the first Tagalog movie of 2016 after the 2015 Metro Manila Film Festival.

== Reception ==
Pep.ph recommended the film for its cast, humor, and message, as the film called on "...movie producers to come up with films that won't insult the intelligence of viewers and become an embarrassment to the industry." Rappler however, gave a negative review of the film saying "In the end, the film is nothing more than a collection of abysmal stories that are crafted with very little ingenuity."
