= Stainless Longganisa =

- First edition
- Author: Bob Ong
- Language: Tagalog, English
- Genre: Humor, Filipino Culture
- Publisher: Visprint
- Publication date: December 2005
- Publication place: Philippines
- Media type: Print (Paperback)
- Pages: 184
- ISBN: 971-92574-2-3
- OCLC: 76824421

Stainless Longganisa is a semi-autobiographical book written by Bob Ong, his fifth published work. Released in December 2005 by Visprint, it follows the style used in Bob Ong's first three publications: the use of contemporary Filipino language to express the author's views on Filipino culture. Unlike the first three books, however, it mainly deals with literature. According to the blurb, it focuses on [translated from the vernacular]: " ... stories by leaking pens about the importance of reading, reaching your dreams and the correct way of writing." As of 2011 (the year his ninth book, Lumayo Ka Nga Sa Akin, was released), Stainless Longganisa is currently his latest book written in a semi-autobiographical style.
