= Bob Ong =

Pseudonym of an unknown Filipino author

- Born: Pasay, Philippines
- Occupation: Author
- Genre: Humor

Bob Ong is the pseudonym of a contemporary Filipino author known for using conversational writing technique to create humorous and reflective depictions of Philippine life. The author's actual name and identity are unknown.

== Career ==
Bob Ong pursued writing after dropping out of college. His pseudonym came about when the author was working as a web developer and a teacher, and he put up the Bobong Pinoy website in his spare time. The name roughly translates to "Dumb Filipino", used fondly as a pejorative term. "Although impressed", Bob Ong notes, "my boss would've fired me had he known I was the one behind it." When someone contacted him after mistaking him as an actual person named Bob Ong, his famous pseudonym was born. The site received a People's Choice Philippine Web Award for Weird/Humor in 1998, but was taken down after former President Joseph "Erap" Estrada was ousted after the Second People Power Revolution.

According to Nida Ramirez of Visprint, which eventually became Bob Ong's publisher, the author wrote on Bobong Pinoy that he wanted to get a book published. Ramirez, who became a fan of Bobong Pinoy, approached him and started exchanging messages, which eventually led to the publication of ABNKKBSNPLAko?!, Bob Ong's first book, in 2001. The author has since written and published ten more books until 2018. His latest book, 56, would also be his last one published under Visprint, which closed in 2021.

== Adaptations ==
Two of his works have been adapted into film. ABNKKBSNPLAko?! The Movie was released in 2014 directed by Mark Meily. Then in 2016, Lumayo Ka Nga Sa Akin was shown in theaters, directed also by Meily, with Chris Martinez and Andoy Ranay. VIVA Films produced both movies. In addition, Bob Ong also played a part in translating some volumes of the Filipino comic book series Trese by Budjette Tan, which was included by the Philippine Department of Education as supplemental material for schools.

== Pseudonym ==
There have been occasional confusions between Bob Ong and Chinese-Filipino author Charlson Ong. However, Bob Ong himself refutes this in his account in Stainless Longganisa, saying his surname is not "Ong" and neither is he even Filipino-Chinese. The family name was instead derived from wordplay on the name of his website. In a 2016 interview published in Philippine Star when asked why he chose his pseudonym, Bob Ong explained it as a "concept of not embracing celebrity which is foreign to most people", and was never intended to be "mysterious".

The poet Paolo Manalo has also been put forward as Ong, but he has denied this.

== Political views ==
Bob Ong endorsed former Vice President of the Philippines Leni Robredo in the 2022 elections.

== Reception ==
Six of the books he has published have surpassed a quarter of a million copies. One anonymous reviewer from Rock Czar notes when his book Macarthur was released, (translated from Filipino):

"Filipinos really patronize Bob Ong's works because, while most of his books may have an element of comedy in them, this is presented in a manner that replicates Filipino culture and traditions. This is likely the reason why his first book - and those that followed it, can be considered true Pinoy classics."

== Bibliography ==
=== Non-fiction ===
- ABNKKBSNPLAko?! (2001)
- Bakit Baliktad Magbasa ng Libro ang mga Pilipino? (2002)
- Ang Paboritong Libro ni Hudas (2003)
- Stainless Longganisa (2005)
- 56 (2018)
- The Boy with a Snake in his Schoolbag (2023) – an English translation of ABNKKBSNPLAko

=== Fiction ===
- Alamat ng Gubat (2003)
- Macarthur (2007)
- Kapitan Sino (2009)
- Ang mga Kaibigan ni Mama Susan (2010)
- Lumayo Ka Nga Sa Akin (2011)
- Si (2014)
