= Zsazsa Zaturnnah =

- Zsazsa Zaturnnah

Publication information
- Publisher: Visprint; Avenida Books
- First appearance: Ang Kagilagilalas na Pakikipagsapalaran ni Zsazsa Zaturnnah (The Amazing Adventures of Zsazsa Zaturnnah), Alamat Comics #1 (2002)
- Created by: Carlo Vergara

In-story information
- Alter ego: Ada or Adrian
- Species: Zendarian
- Place of origin: Zendar (Zatur Galaxy)
- Team affiliations: Didi (assistant to Ada); Dodong (friend; object of Ada's affection)
- Abilities: Invulnerability; Super strength; Super reflexes; Unlimited stamina; Longevity; Super agility; Super speed and reaction time; Skilled in hand-to-hand combat; Indestructible chest; energy projection; energy manipulation; energy absorption

Ang Kagila-gilalas na Pakikipagsapalaran ni Zsazsa Zaturnnah
- Ang Kagila-gilalas na Pakikipagsapalaran ni Zsazsa Zaturnnah
- Date: 2003
- Main characters: Zsazsa Zaturnnah, Ada, Didi
- Series: Zsazsa Zaturnnah
- Publisher: Visprint

Original publication
- Published in: self-published
- Date of publication: 2002
- Language: Tagalog
- ISBN: 9789719234227 (Paperback published by Visprint); 9789710545841 (15th Anniversary Edition, Hardcover, 190 pages); 9786218264182 (Paperback published by Avenida)

Zsazsa Zaturnnah is a comic book superheroine created by Filipino illustrator and graphic designer Carlo Vergara. The character first appeared in the Filipino graphic novel, Ang Kagila-gilalas na Pakikipagsapalaran ni Zsazsa Zaturnnah (Tagalog for The Amazing Adventures of Zsazsa Zaturnnah), originally a self-published work in December 2002 consisting of two parts. It was later distributed and merged in a single volume by Visprint Inc. (Visual Print Enterprises). The graphic novel won a National Book Award in 2003 given by the Manila Critics Circle. It was the 12th bestselling fiction book among Philippine publications in 2005 based on the records of National Book Store.

Having a cult following, Zsazsa Zaturnnah is a red-haired curvaceous superheroine whose alter-ego, Ada, is a gay beautician from a Philippine province. Ada turns into the superheroine upon swallowing a melon-sized magical stone and shouting "Zaturnnah!" The plot of the graphic novel is laid like a parody of Darna and Vergara paid tribute to Mars Ravelo's creation but Zsazsa Zaturnnah is a character on its own as the story deals with issues encountered by the LGBT community. She is also used as reference and subject in gender studies courses in some universities, including the government-run University of the Philippines. The first book was followed up by the Zsazsa Zaturnnah sa Kalakkhang Maynila' series. It is a three-part series with the first part released in 2012 while the second part was released in 2016. Vergara is still working on the third part as of April 2019.

Beyond comics and other literature, Zsazsa Zaturnnah appeared in other media including film and theater. Zsa Zsa Padilla who is the inspiration for the character's first name portrayed Zsazsa Zaturnnah in the 2006 film Zsazsa Zaturnnah Ze Moveeh with her alter-ego Ada played by BB Gandanghari. From 2006 to 2011, a musical theater entitled Zsazsa Zaturnnah Ze Muzikal was staged by Tanghalang Pilipino at the Cultural Center of the Philippines as well as in different places with different actors playing Zsazsa Zaturnnah (including Eula Valdez and K Brosas) and Ada (including Tuxqs Rutaquio and Vincent de Jesus). In 2019, Rocketsheep Studio is currently developing an animated film for Zsazsa Zaturnnah, featuring Vergara's character.

== Publication history ==
Zsazsa Zaturnnah first appeared in a two-part self-published Filipino graphic novel entitled Ang Kagila-gilalas na Pakikipagsapalaran ni Zsazsa Zaturnnah (Tagalog for The Amazing Adventures of Zsazsa Zaturnnah) in December 2002 by Filipino illustrator and graphic designer Carlo Vergara through Alamat Comics. Eventually, Visual Print Enterprises became the distributor of Vergara's work throughout the Philippines, making it available in a merged single volume in 2003. Manila Critics Circle granted the graphic novel a National Book Award in 2003. It became the bestselling book of 2005 in the Philippine fiction category according to the records of National Book Store, a Philippine retail bookstore chain. Since then, Zsazsa Zaturnnah generated a cult following.

Vergara previewed forty pages of the second book for Zsazsa Zaturnnah in May 2008 on his blog. A limited number of the published preview consisting of twenty-six pages only was made available for the viewers of the Zsazsa Zaturnnah Ze Musikal theater play in February 2011. The sequel, entitled Zsazsa Zaturnnah sa Kalakhang Maynila (Zsazsa Zaturnnah at Metro Manila) and totaling eighty-six pages, chronicles Ada and Dodong's adventures upon coming in Metro Manila. The second book, which is the first part of three parts, was eventually published and released on January 25, 2012, by Visprint Inc. again.

It was announced in February 2016 by Vergara that the third book, which is the second part of the Zsazsa Zaturnnah sa Kalakhang Maynila series, was already 75% complete. Visprint Inc. eventually released it also in 2016 after Vergara finished it. Zsazsa Zaturnnah sa Kalakhang Maynila Volume 2 has a hint of a more science fiction focused story. As of April 2019, Vergara is still working on the part three of the Zsazsa Zaturnnah sa Kalakhang Maynila series with forty pages remaining to draw as well as an English version of the first graphic novel that has a title of The Spectacular Adventures of Zsazsa Zaturnnah according to his Patreon page.

After the closure of Visprint Inc. in 2021, Avenida Books became the new publisher of the two graphic novels along with other notable titles of the former publisher.

== Character background ==
Zsazsa Zaturnnah is a voluptuous red-haired superheroine that Carlo Vergara created as homage to the classic Filipino superhero Darna, a Mars Ravelo creation. The story of the first graphic novel is read as if it is a parody of Darna but Zsazsa Zaturnnah is character on its own. Moreover, Vergara did not intentionally want to spoof Darna. The distinct difference of the character is the sexuality of her alter ego Ada, who is an effeminate homosexual male and a proprietor of a small town beauty salon in the province. Ada is just a nickname for Adrian. After Ada receives a huge spiky melon-sized stone, he ingested it and shouted "Zaturnnah!," which is written in the stone; he then physically transforms himself into Zsazsa Zaturnnah.

In the comics, when Ada turned into a superheroine for the first time, Didi, Ada's assistant and best friend, named Ada's female transformation as Zsazsa Zaturnnah. In reality, Vergara initially named the character as Zaturnnah but his aiming to have her name as an alliteration (just like with the names Peter Parker and Reed Richards); thus, the first name should start with the letter Z. Vergara was able to pick the name Zsazsa after Zsa Zsa Padilla who was considered as a gay icon during a time. Her power includes invulnerability, super strength, super agility and indestructible chest. Ada's personality and consciousness retain upon transforming to the superheroine but her hair styling and hair cutting skills are gone. As a giant frog invades town, Zsazsa Zaturnnah's journey as a superheroine begins. Her enemies compose of Amazoniztas from Planet Xxx, which led by Queen Femina Suarestellar Baroux, as well as zombies and a giant cockroach.

Ada seeks for a real man that he will love in spite of a previous failed relationship and consistently denying that he is looking for one. His father who is already dead disapproved his sexual orientation even when his father turned into a zombie, he refuses to accept Ada being a gay person. Nonetheless, Ada loves her father but his father finishes his life for the second time that ends hope for reconciliation. Dodong, Ada's love interest, expresses his love to Ada and proposes to live with him.

== Cultural impact ==
The story of Zsazsa Zaturnnah has been the subject of a number of academic essays particularly discussing LGBTQ+ topics and studying gender. One of those essays is Soledad S. Reyes' "From Darna to Zsazsa Zaturnnah" that appears in her essay collection Darna to Zsazsa Zaturnnah: Desire and Fantasy : Essays on Literature and Popular Culture, published by Anvil Publishing in 2009. Another essay that also features Zsazsa Zaturnnah is "Carlo Vergara's Zsazsa Zaturnnah and the Tradition of Subversion in Philippine Komiks" by Eleanor Sarah Reposar, appearing in the essay collection Philippine Studies: Have We Gone Beyond St. Louis? that was edited by Priscelina Patajo-Legasto, and published by the University of the Philippines Press in 2008. In addition, the character has been included in the gender studies curriculum in various universities in the Philippines including the University of the Philippines, a state university.

Filmmaker and educator David R. Corpuz has written two works about Zsazsa Zaturnnah and her impact in gender representations. Corpuz wrote a paper in 2008 named Subverting Zsazsa Zaturnnah: A Critical Analysis on the Gender Representations on Carlo Vergara's Ang Kagila-Gilalas Na Pakikipagsapalaran Ni Zsazsa Zaturnnah. The paper was later submitted at the 8th ASEAN Inter-University Conference on Social Development in May 2008 that he presented under the University of the Philippines College of Mass Communications. The second work is a 2010 journal entitled Subverting Zsazsa Zaturnnah: The Bakla, the "Real" Man and the Myth of Acceptance published by the University of the Philippines Center for Women's Studies as part of a refereed journal named Review of Women's Studies, tackling the issues on media, gender and sexuality.

Two magazines featured Zsazsa Zaturnnah. The first one was in a June 2009 FHM Philippines issue. The character was illustrated by the creator, Vergara. The second one was in a March 2015 Esquire Philippines magazine issue as the cover girl with Vergara illustrating the writing the 12-page feature. Zsazsa Zaturnnah is the first cover girl for the magazine that is a comic character or a trans woman. In 2012, the character was in a television commercial for a classified ads website where Lourd de Veyra turned into Zsazsa Zaturnnah. After the part two of Zsazsa Zaturnnah sa Kalakhang Maynila was released, Sebastian's Ice Cream produced an ice cream brand that is named after the character, the Zaturnnah Diva Bar and the company made it to promote the second installment of the Zsazsa Zaturnnah sa Kalakhang Maynila series. Space Encounters, a furniture company, made a Zsazsa Zaturnnah inspired product line in 2018 to celebrate the character's sixteenth anniversary.

Despite being a character celebrated by LGBT community, Vergara who is openly gay did not create Zsazsa Zaturnnah to advance LGBT rights into the mainstream culture. He further said that he is not an activist and has no agenda in making the character, which he created not only for the gay audience since he has many readers who are not gay. Although, he considers his creation as probably subversive.

== In other media ==
=== Theater ===
==== 2006–2007 ====
The graphic novel was adapted into a stage musical by Tanghalang Pilipino as Zsazsa Zaturnnah Ze Muzikal. Production credits consist of Chris Martinez for theatrical adaptation, Vincent de Jesus for lyrics, composition and musical direction, and Chris Millado for stage direction. The musical was first staged at the Cultural Center of the Philippines (CCP) Tanghalang Huseng Batute from February 10 to March 5, 2006. Eula Valdez played the title role that earned her a Best Stage Actress for a Musical award during the 19th Aliw Award in 2006. Other lead roles were played by Tuxqs Rutaquio as the character Ada, Ricci Chan as Didi, alternates Lauren Novero and Arnold Reyes as Dodong, and alternates Agot Isidro and Kalila Aguilos as Queen Femina Suarestellar Baroux.

A repeat of the musical also took place at the PETA (Philippine Educational Theater Association) Theater in Quezon City from April 21 to 30, 2006. The role of Didi was played by Joey Paras. From June 16 to 18, 2006, the Zsazsa Zaturnnah Ze Muzikal was staged again in CCP Tanghalang Huseng Batute for the 2006 International Theater Festival. The Philippines hosted the festival, which featured stage plays from different countries in the ASEAN and Asia-Pacific regions.

The fourth staging took place from January 19 to 28, 2007 at the Tanghalang Huseng Batute at the Cultural Center of the Philippines. Eighteen shows were staged from June 15 to July 1, 2007, for the musical's fifth run, which took place at the Carlos P. Romulo Auditorium of the RCBC Plaza in Makati. Nar Cabico played Didi and Ada was played again by Tuxqs Rutaquio alternating with the musical director Vincent de Jesus. Eula Valdez reprised her role as Zsazsa Zaturnnah with K Brosas alternating her.

A soundtrack for the stage play was released by Ballyhoo Records in 2007. It comes in a two-CD set and a digital download consisting of 22 tracks from the original cast recordings. The album art is designed by Zsazsa Zaturnnah creator Carlo Vergara. The musical was scheduled to run from November 16 to 18, 2007 in Cebu City but it was later postponed, and was reset for the first quarter of 2008. Eventually, the musical wasn't staged in Cebu.

==== 2009–2011 ====
The sixth run of the musical ran from February 5 to 15, 2009 and March 6 to 8, 2009 at the Tanghalang Aurelio Tolentino of the CCP with Eula Valdez and other original cast members returning. The new actors who joined this run were Meliza Reyes-Uy (Queen Femina) and Red Anderson (Dodong). Joey Paras and Lauren Novero returned to reprise their roles as Didi and Dodong, respectively. In addition, the chorus became larger.

When Tanghalang Pilipino struggled for financial woes in 2010, the theater company shelved the staging of the adaptation of F. Sionil Jose's My Brother, My Executioner and it was instead replaced by the seventh staging of the Zsa Zsa Zaturnnah musical that took place from February 18, 2011, to March 19, 2011, at the Tanhalang Aurelio Tolentino of the CCP. The musical changed its title to Zsazsa Zaturnnah...Vack With A Vengence! and the new actors joining the seventh run were Philippine theater veteran Pinky Amador (Queen Femina), ramp model and indie film actor Rocky Salumbides, television actor Prince Stefan (Dodong) and comedian Gabe Mercado (Didi). With a total of 95 shows at the end of this run, Zsazsa Zaturnnah Ze Muzikal is the longest running musical ever staged by Tanghalang Pilipino.

==== 2023 ====
Years after its last run, Zsazsa Zaturnnah made a comeback on stage for a limited run from March 17 to April 2, under the name Zsazsa Zaturnnah the Musical... 'Yun Lang!. Staged by the Ateneo Blue Repertory under the direction of Missy Maramara, the case was headlined by singer/actress Kim Molina in the titular role and joined by the likes of Phi Palmos, Adrian Lindayag, and Shaun Ocrisma for the role of Ada and Kakki Teodoro for the role of Queen Femina. This production is considered to be a new gen staging, with revisions in the script and a new song for Aling Britney. This production was staged in the Doreen Black Box Theatre, Areté, Ateneo de Manila University.

=== Film ===
==== Zsazsa Zaturnnah Ze Moveeh ====
In 2006, Regal Entertainment adapted a film for Vergara's first graphic novel story about Zsazsa Zaturnnah entitled Zsazsa Zaturnnah Ze Moveeh that was directed by Joel Lamangan. Among the actresses who had been tapped or had expressed interest to play the title role were Kris Aquino, Zsa Zsa Padilla and comedian Rufa Mae Quinto. The role had originally been awarded to Quinto, but was subsequently given to Zsa Zsa Padilla who was picked personally by Regal Film's producer Lily Monteverde. Other actors with principal roles include BB Gandanghari as the character Ada, Chokoleit as Didi, Alfred Vargas as Dodong and Pops Fernandez as Queen Femina Suarestellar Baroux.

The film had been accepted as one of ten films for competition in the 2006 Metro Manila Film Festival that began on December 25. It did not win any of the festival's awards and grossed only over Php 11 million compared to the festival's top grosser Kasal, Kasali, Kasalo, which earned over Php 139 million in the box office. However, Gandanghari got a Gawad Urian for Best Actor and Gawad Tanglaw awards for playing Ada. Likewise, Chocoleit who portrayed Didi received a Best Supporting Actor award from Gawad Tanglaw. The film's original song "Multo ng Nakaraan" (Ghost of the Past) won the Best Original Song award also from Gawad Tanglaw. The song was composed by Vincent de Jesus, originally for the stage musical.

The film was nominated for Best Picture (musical/comedy) in the 4th Golden Screen Awards in 2007. Gandanghari, Chokoleit and Padilla were also nominated for Best Performance by an Actor in a Leading Role (musical or comedy), Best Performance by an Actor in a Supporting Role (drama, musical or comedy) and Best Performance by an Actress in a Leading Role (musical or comedy), respectively. Eventually, Dinno Erece won for Best Adapted Screenplay while Vincent de Jesus won Best Original Song for "Ikaw Ang Superhero ng Buhay Ko" (You are the Superhero of My Life) at the 4th Golden Screen Awards. For his work in Zsazsa Zaturnnah Ze Moveeh, de Jesus also won the Movie Musical Scorer of the Year Score at the 2007 PMPC Star Awards for Movies, Best Music at the 2007 Gawad Urian Awards and Best Musical Score at the 2007 Film Academy of the Philippines Luna Awards.

==== Animated film ====
A teaser for an animated Zsa Zsa Zaturnnah was posted at Facebook in June 2019 by Rocketsheep Studio, the same animation production company that made Saving Sally. Zaturnnah creator himself, Vergara, penned the screenplay and he wrote a fresh script to fit the story in an animated feature. Vergara wanted a television series for the character but when he was approached by Avid Liongoren of Rocketsheep to do a new full-length film, he accepted it, although, he was initially hesitant in doing another film for Zsazsa Zaturnnah. It was supposed to be a live-action film but they settled with a full animated film.

=== Live Stream ===
In 2020, the Cultural Center of the Philippines streamed the 2011 archival recording of Ze Muzikal on YouTube. The 2011 archival recording from the CCP Cultural Content Archives stars Eula Valdez as Zsazsa Zaturnnah, with Tuxqs Rutaquio as Ada, Nar Cabico as Didi, Red Anderson as Dodong, and Kalila Aguilos as Queen Femina Suarestella Baroux.

== Collected editions ==
Title	Volume	Issue	ISBN	Date
Ang Kagilagilalas na Pakikipagsapalaran ni Zsazsa Zaturnnah (The Spectacular Adventures of ZsaZsa Zaturnnah)	Alamat Comics	#1		January 1, 2002
Sa Kalakhang Maynila	Zsazsa Zaturnnah	#1	978-971-0545-10-0	January 2012
Sa Kalakhang Maynila	Zsazsa Zaturnnah	#2	978-971-0545-63-6	2016
