= Ang mga Kaibigan ni Mama Susan =

2010 novel by Bob Ong

- Book cover
- Author: Bob Ong
- Language: Filipino
- Genre: Mystery; Horror; Suspense
- Publisher: Visprint; Avenida
- Publication date: 2010
- Publication place: Philippines
- Media type: Print (Paperback)
- Pages: 127
- ISBN: 978-971-0545-03-2
- Preceded by: Kapitan Sino
- Followed by: Lumayo Ka Nga sa Akin

Ang mga Kaibigan ni Mama Susan (transl. Mama Susan's Friends) is a 2010 mystery novel by Filipino writer Bob Ong published in 2010 by Visprint Inc. It is Ong's eighth book, and his first attempt in the horror/suspense genre.

== Plot ==
The story revolves around Gilberto "Galo" P. Manansala, a college student in an unnamed university in Manila, and his journal entries that he writes for one of his college instructors. In the entries he describes how his everyday situations turn into scary situations, how he uncovers various mysteries and horrors, and how he gets deeply involved in these mysteries and horrors and, in the end, cannot escape them.

== Characters ==
Most characters in Galo's journal are people he encounters every day, and some are not described other than having their name mentioned. It can be concluded that these people, of whom little is known, are the people that Galo cannot understand very well, and that his thoughts stray away from them because of personal issues.

- Gilberto "Galo" P. Manansala: The journal's owner. The story is told from his point of view. He is a student at an unidentified college in Manila, living an ordinary life under the care of his aunt. He has lived with this family since high school and he says that he is thankful for everything that his aunt's family has provided him. At sixteen he is young for a college student, and mentions that he started school at a very young age. Little is known about his appearance, except that he wears glasses and has a short haircut which causes him to be teased as a military cadet. He can be described as a typical male college student from his first journal entries, despite family matters. It can also be concluded that he is intelligent because, in his journal, he states that even though he spaces out in class while writing in his journal, he still manages to recite and get the correct answer. He also gets an offer from an instructor to write in a publication. It is hinted that he can play the guitar.
- Tiya Auring (transl. Aunt Auring): Galo's primary guardian and the sister of Galo's mom. She has four children and is aloof and stern, according to Galo's description. He says that he tries not to get involved with his aunt as long as he can get away with it. She is bossy and loud.
- Tiyo Dindo (transl. Uncle Dindo): Auring's husband and Galo's uncle who secretly helps Galo in paying his tuition without the knowledge of Galo's aunt, Tiya Auring.
- Aling Delia (transl. Miss Delia): The right-hand woman of Mama Susan.
- Mama Susan: Galo's grandmother and the leader of a religious group in their province. She is sick when Galo returns to her home and she dies near the end of the story.

== Reception ==
Some reviews of the book say that the pace is monotonous; however, it does pick up in the end and cryptic Latin messages embedded in Galo's journal entries add a sense of mystery to the story.

It has become a best seller, ranking first at most book stores in the Philippines.

== Film adaptation ==
A possible film adaptation of the book had been teased on Bob Ong's Facebook page in March 2016. On February 6, 2020, it was announced that the book will finally be adapted into film, starring Joshua Garcia as Galo, which will be directed by Chito S. Roño and will be co-produced by Black Sheep Productions and Regal Entertainment.

It was released on May 18, 2023 on Amazon Prime Video.
