= ABNKKBSNPLAko?! =

Book by Bob Ong

- First edition
- Author: Bob Ong
- Language: Filipino
- Genre: Humor Autobiography
- Publisher: Visprint Inc.
- Publication date: 2001
- Publication place: Philippines
- Media type: Print (Paperback)
- Pages: 135
- ISBN: 971-92342-0-2
- OCLC: 52268836

ABNKKBSNPLAko?! is a 2001 autobiography by Filipino author Bob Ong — his first and most popular work. The title is meant to be read phonetically as "Aba, nakakabasa na pala ako?!", which can be roughly translated as "Wow, I can actually read now?!" The novel details what are supposedly the childhood memories of the author, from his earliest days as a student until his first few years at work.

The book was a surprise hit in 2001, quickly selling out its first run of 500 copies. By 2013, it had sold over 240,000 copies, at which time a 12th anniversary edition was published. The success of Bob Ong's book among Filipinos has been attributed to its conversational tone which uses humor to point out various absurdities inherent to Filipino culture. The popularity of ABNKKBSNPLAko?! in particular is attributed to an element of nostalgia says University of the Philippines literary professor, Philippines Free Press literary editor, and award-winning poet Paolo Manalo about Bob Ong's work: "The materials he used in his books are those familiar to this generation of Filipinos. One might even call them urban culture lore...."

An English translation was published and released internationally, titled "The Boy with a Snake in His Schoolbag: A Memoir from Manila (Or Something Like That)", by Tuttle Publishing in 2023.

== Film and other adaptations ==
A film version titled ABNKKBSNPLAko?! The Movie was released by VIVA Films and MVP Entertainment on February 19, 2014. It starred Andi Eigenmann as "special someone", Meg Imperial as Portia, Vandolph Quizon as Ulo and Jericho Rosales as Bob Ong. It is directed by Mark Meily, and the script was written by Ned Trespeces.

A board game based on the book was published.
