= Manix Abrera =

Filipino cartoonist

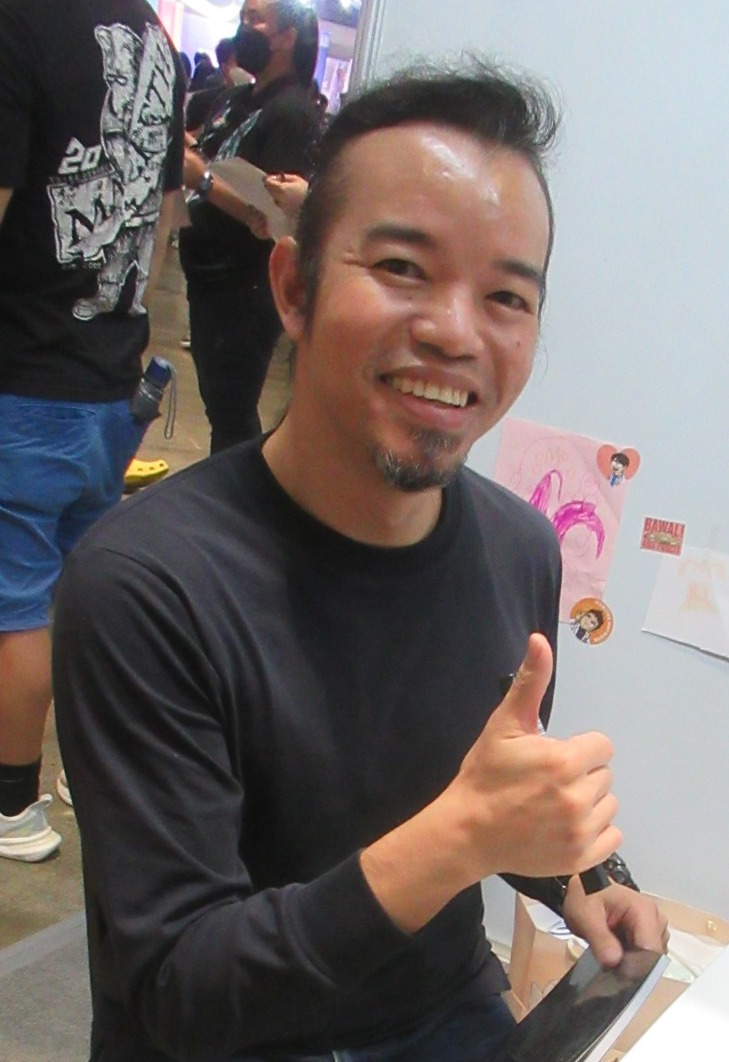
- Abrera in 2023
- Born: Manuel Luis Lorenzo Abrera; 1982 (age 43–44); Metro Manila, Philippines
- Education: University of the Philippines Diliman
- Known for: Comic strip
- Notable work: Kikomachine Komix
- Father: Jess Abrera
- Website: www.manixabrera.com

Manuel Luis "Manix" Lorenzo Abrera is a Filipino comic strip cartoonist best known for Kikomachine Komix.

== Early life and education ==
Manuel Luis "Manix" Lorenzo Abrera was born in 1982 in Metro Manila and is the son of comic strips cartoonist Jess Abrera. His mother is Bernadette Abrera, a historian and a dean. The Abrera patriarch made Pinoy Nga and A. Lipin as well as illustrated Nick Joaquin's ' Versus Ibong Adarna.

Manix Abrera pursued a fine arts degree at the University of the Philippines Diliman in the late 1990s. To create a separate reputation from his father he joined UP's student publication paper, Philippine Collegian

== Career ==
As part of the Philippine Collegian team, Abrera drew comics. He originally worked with two other fellow fine arts students on a comic strip entitled Garapata Blood (lit. '"Tick blood'). When space for more comics became available on the paper, Abrera started a solo project, which was Kikomachine in 2001.

Kikomachine was later published regularly in the Philippine Daily Inquirer The comic strips was also made available in paperback with at least 13 volumes published by 2022.

Abrera is also a comics cover illustrator. He drew the covers for Department of Truth #16 and Monkey Meat #1 for Image Comics. He also illustrated a variant cover for the very first volume of DC Comics' Batman: The Knight

== Awards ==
Abrera was one of The Outstanding Young Men (TOYM) award in 2022.

== Books ==
- Kikomachine Komix Blg. 1 Mga Tagpong Mukhang Ewan at Kung Anu-Ano Pang Kababalaghan!
- Kikomachine Komix Blg. 2 Mga Tagpong Tila Nagpapaka-Weird, Kunyari Pa-Deep, Sarap Sapakin…
- Kikomachine Komix Blg. 3 Die! Die, Evil! Die
- Kikomachine Komix Blg. 4 O Kaligayahang Walang Hanggan!
- Kikomachine Komix Blg. 5 Alab ng Puso Sa Dibdib Mo’y Buhay!
- 12
- Kikomachine Komix Blg. 6 Venn Man at Iba Pang Kalupitan ng Kapalaran!
- Kikomachine Komix Blg. 7 Sorrowful Sorrowful Mysteries!
- Kikomachine Komix Blg. 8
- Kikomachine Komix Blg. 9 Ilayo Mo Kami Sa Apoy ng Impyerno!
- Kikomachine Komix Blg. 10 Sanduguan ng Sangkalawakan
- 14
- Kikomachine Komix Blg. 11 Mga Kirot ng Kapalaran
- Kikomachine Komix Blg. 12 Mandirigma ng Tadhana
- Kikomachine Komix Blg. 13 Aklat Sekreto ng mga Lihim na Karunungan!
- Kikomachine Komix Omnibus 1
