= Kajo Baldisimo =

Filipino comic book artist

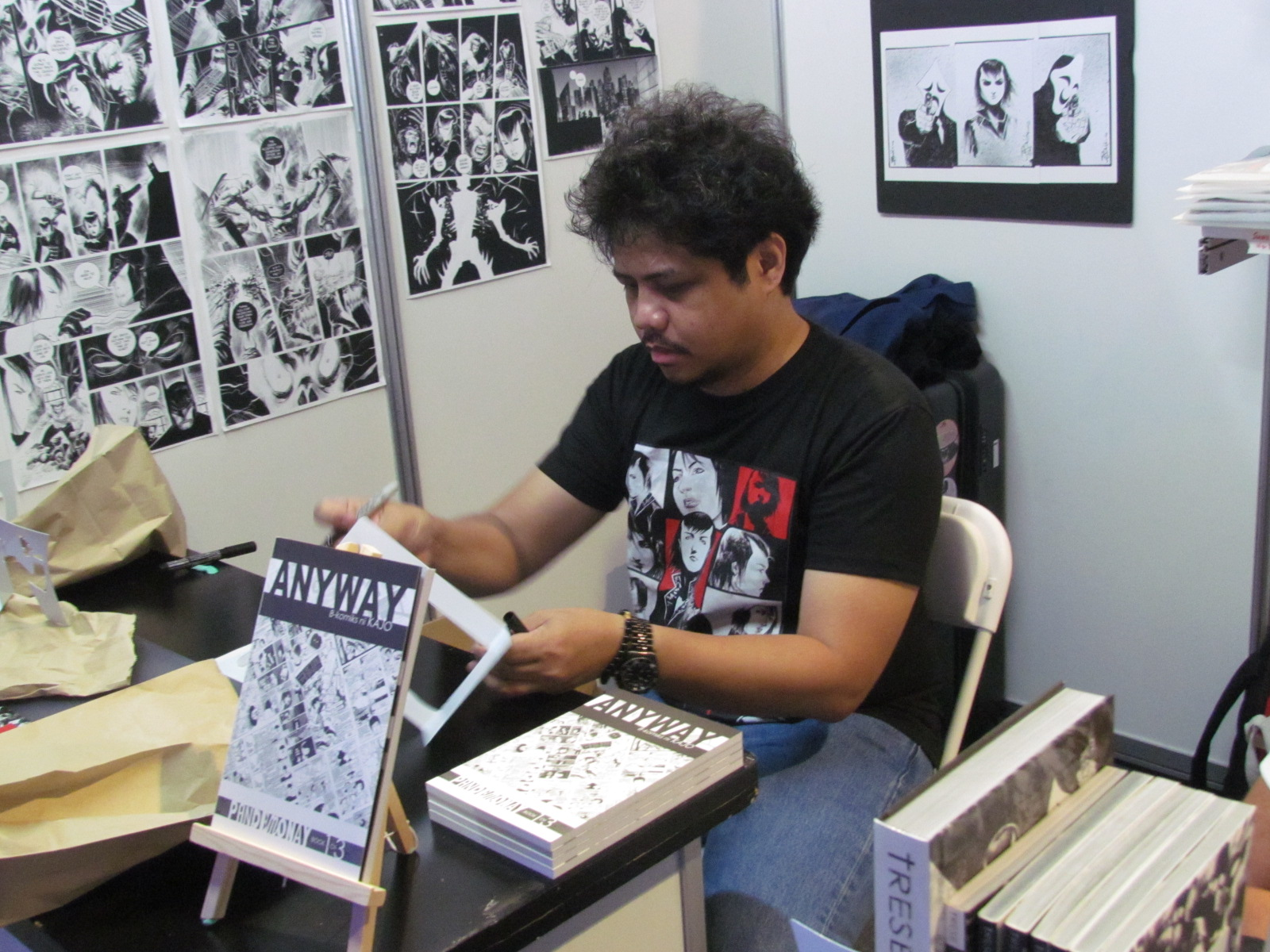
Kajo Baldisimo signing during the event on 2023 Manila International Book Fair at SMX Convention Center Manila, Philippines.

Kajo Baldisimo is a Filipino comic book artist best known for illustrating the horror/crime komiks series Trese, co-creating it with writer Budjette Tan. His work Trese has won the Philippine National Book Award for Best Graphic Literature of the Year in 2009, 2011, 2012. It has been adapted into an animated series by Netflix.

== Other Works ==
Kajo Baldisimo also worked on titles from Dark Horse's Star Wars Legacy series and Who Wants To Be A Superhero.

- Star Wars: Legacy #41-- Rogue's End
- Star Wars: Legacy Book 2 HC
- Who Wants To Be A Superhero: The Defuser
