= Paolo Manalo =

Filipino poet

Paolo Manalo is a Filipino poet who teaches at the College of Arts and Letters, University of the Philippines Diliman. For a time he served as the literary editor of the Philippines Free Press.

Jolography, his first book of poems, received the 1st prize in poetry from the 2002 Palanca Awards and the 2004 U.P. Gawad Chancellor Para sa Natatanging Likha ng Sining (Outstanding Literary Work). He released his second book of poems, “Happily Ever Ek-ek,” in 2019.

He earned his Ph.D. creative writing at the University of St Andrews.
