= Carlo Vergara =

Filipino graphic designer and illustrator

- Born: Visconde Carlo San Juan Vergara; January 25, 1971 (age 55) Philippines
- Areas: Writer, Artist
- Pseudonyms: Carver, Carl
- Notable works: One Night in Purgatory, Zsazsa Zaturnnah
- Collaborators: David Hontiveros, Vincent de Jesus

Visconde Carlo San Juan Vergara or simply known as Carlo Vergara (born January 25, 1971) is a Filipino graphic designer and illustrator best known for creating the comic book character Zsazsa Zaturnnah. Vergara is also a theatre performer and published playwright.

== Biography ==
The son of a tax lawyer and an English teacher, Vergara began to draw even before he started school. He considered drawing as a hobby, and did not want it to be part of his profession. Though he had been accepted in the College of Architecture at the University of the Philippines, he opted to take Marketing Management at the De La Salle University (DLSU), and graduated in 1990.

It was during his stay at DLSU when he won his first literary award from the university's annual awards for literature--Solitude bagged third place in the English poetry category. He was also part of the art section of The La Sallian, the university's student publication. A few years after graduating, Vergara joined the university's theater organization, the Harlequin Theater Guild, where he acted in productions of Shirley Jackson's The Lottery, Susan Glaspell's Trifles, Agatha Christie's Towards Zero, and Wilfrido Ma. Guerrero's Forever.

Beginning in 1993, Vergara spent almost a decade working in public relations and corporate communications as a staff writer, photographer, graphic designer, and on occasion, special events host. It was during this time when he began to take serious interest in graphic design.

Though drawing had always been his hobby, Vergara never attempted to tackle a full-blown comics project until mid-1993. Flashpoint was a comics series he co-created with friends from DLSU, and was published by Straight Lines International. After four issues, Flashpoint was discontinued, and Vergara stopped drawing comics for a few years. He, however, became a member of Alamat, an informal group of comics creators and enthusiasts.

In 1994, he auditioned for a part in the New Voice Company production of the Asian premiere of Tony Kushner's Angels in America. He bagged a part, alternating the role of Louis Ironson with Philippine theater veteran Bart Guingona. Though reviews to his professional debut were mostly lukewarm to negative, Vergara continued his acting training with the New Voice Company. He subsequently performed in the independently produced productions of David Gobeil Taylor's Waiting for Homo and Anton Chekhov's The Boor. It was during these years when he had feature articles published in the now defunct Cutting Edge magazine and The Manila Times.

In 1999, he went back to the De La Salle University to teach a website design course for a term. During this period, he collaborated with writer David Hontiveros on an independent comic book, Pantheon, marking Vergara's return as an artist to the comics medium.

== Published works ==
=== One Night in Purgatory ===
His first foray into self-publishing was in 2001, when he produced, wrote and illustrated One Night in Purgatory, a short comics tale about homosexual love. The comicbook was nominated by the Manila Critics Circle for a National Book Award the following year, and was cited by the Sanghaya Yearbook of the state-run National Commission for Culture and the Arts.

=== Zsazsa Zaturnnah series ===
==== Ang Kagila-gilalas na Pakikipagsapalaran ni Zsazsa Zaturnnah ====
In 2002, Vergara produced his second graphic novel, Ang Kagila-gilalas na Pakikipagsapalaran ni Zsazsa Zaturnnah (The Spectacular Adventures of Zsazsa Zaturnnah). The graphic novel earned recognition from the Manila Critics Circle in 2003, thus giving Vergara his first National Book Award. The book was later adapted into a musical and feature film in 2006. In the nominees list of the 30th Gawad Urian (an award-giving body composed on film critics), Vergara was cited along with Dinno Erece in the screenplay category.

For the musical's soundtrack album, Vergara asked musical director/composer Vincent de Jesus for a slot in the track list. De Jesus did a piano arrangement for the song "Ayoko Nang Mabuhay Nang Ganito" ("I Don't Want To Live This Way Anymore"), the lead character's torch song, to which Vergara lent his vocals.

==== Zsazsa Zaturnnah sa Kalakhang Maynila ====
Formerly the art director of Summit Publishing's Real Living magazine, creative director of the company's Special Publications group, and creative director of the Philippine edition of Good Housekeeping magazine, a publication licensed through Hearst Magazines International, Vergara is currently working on the sequel to the Zsazsa Zaturnnah story. The first part of the sequel Zsazsa Zaturnnah sa Kalakhang Maynila (Zsazsa Zaturnnah in Metro Manila) was released in January 2012, and subsequently earned Vergara his second Philippine National Book Award in 2013. For that book, he was also nominated for Best Book Design.

=== Kung Paano Ako Naging Leading Lady ===
Vergara wrote the one-act play Kung Paano Ako Naging Leading Lady (How I Became Leading Lady), which was accepted and presented in June 2013 during the 9th Virgin LabFest, a festival of new theatre material, organized by The Tanghalang Pilipino Foundation and The Writer's Bloc, Inc. A comics adaptation of the play, illustrated by Elmer Cantada, was released in November 2013.

=== Ma, Sarap! ===
In 2014, he completed art for the webcomic Ma, Sarap! (Mom, It's Delicious!), written by Jamie Bautista.

== Bibliography ==
- 1993: Flashpoint (4 issues, Straight Lines International) - illustrator, letterer, colorist, art direction, editing
- 1999:
  - Pantheon: Horus (2 issues, self-published) - illustrator
  - Pantheon: Avatar (1 issue, self-published) - illustrator
- 2001:
  - One Night In Purgatory - producer, writer, illustrator, art direction
  - Angel Ace Next (Marco Dimaano for Alamat Comics) - contributing illustrator
  - "He Said, She Said" (Quest Ventures) Isaw, atbp. - illustrator
  - The Lost (2 issues, Kestrel Studios) - cover art
- 2002: Ang Kagila-gilalas na Pakikipagsapalaran ni Zsazsa Zaturnnah (2 parts) - producer, writer, illustrator, art direction
- 2003:
  - Ang Kagila-gilalas na Pakikipagsapalaran ni Zsazsa Zaturnnah (Visual Print Enterprises) - writer, illustrator, art direction (collected edition contains bonus material)
  - Siglo: Freedom (Quest Ventures and Kestrel Studios) - art direction
- 2004: Palawan: 1944 (Quest Ventures and Kestrel Studios) for Siglo: Passion - writer, illustrator
- 2005: Captain Blood for Graphic Classics: Rafael Sabatini (Eureka Productions) - illustrator
- 2006: The Mysteries of Udolpho for Graphic Classics: Gothic Tales (Eureka Productions) - illustrator
- 2008:
  - "The Monk and the Hangman's Daughter" for Graphic Classics: Ambrose Bierce (Eureka Productions) - illustrator
  - Zsazsa Zaturnnah sa Kalakhang Maynila online preview - writer and illustrator
- 2009:
  - "A Silent Reunion" for Komikero Anthology #1 - writer, illustrator
  - "Mission: Accomplished" originally for Love and Heartbreak, later published online - writer, illustrator
- 2010: "The Pit and the Pendulum" for Graphic Classics: Edgar Allan Poe (Eureka Productions) - illustrator
- 2012: Zsazsa Zaturnnah sa Kalakhang Maynila: Part One (Visual Print Enterprises) - writer and illustrator
- 2013: Kung Paano Ako Naging Leading Lady - writer, based on his one-act play of the same title
- various dates: Real Home Ideas volumes 1 to 4, Real Living's Handy Hints and Instant Makeovers, Real Living's Room by Room Makeovers, Good Housekeeping 100+ Fast & Easy Recipes (Summit Books) - art direction
