= Visprint =

Philippine publishing company

Visprint, Inc.
- Status: Closed
- Predecessor: Visual Print Enterprises
- Founded: 1984
- Founder: Efren Gatus, Nido Gatus
- Defunct: 2021
- Country of origin: Philippines
- Headquarters location: Pasay, Metro Manila
- Distribution: Nationwide
- Publication types: Books, comic books, graphic novels

Visprint, Inc. was a Philippine publishing company engaged in the publication of local literature such as novels, comics and graphic novels. Notable works published under Visprint include Bob Ong's ABNKKBSNPLAko?!, Carlo Vergara's Zsazsa Zaturnnah, Budgette Tan and Kajo Baldisimo's Trese, and other works by Eliza Victoria, Mervin Malonzo, and Manix Abrera.

The company was named Publisher of the Year at the 34th Philippine National Book Awards in 2015, and won four National Book Awards that year.

In January 2019, the company announced that it planned to close in 2021.

== See also ==
- Literacy in the Philippines
- Philippine Literature
