= Budjette Tan =

Filipino writer

Budjette Tan during the event on 2026 SuperManila Comic Con, One Ayala, Makati City, Manila, Philippines.

Budjette Tan is a Filipino writer best known for writing the horror/crime komiks series Trese, co-creating it with comic book artist Kajo Baldisimo. His work Trese has won the Philippine National Book Award for Best Graphic Literature of the Year in 2009, 2011, 2012. It has been adapted into an animated series by Netflix.

== Trese ==
=== Inspiration for Trese ===
In 2005, Kajo Baldisimo challenges Budgette Tan to write a monthly comic book series as both wanted to make mark in the comic book scene. The collaboration originally led to the creation a male character named Anton Trese, a detective that uses magic which is heavily influenced from characters in like Batman, John Constantine, Gill Grisham, Fox Mulder, Carl Kolchak. However, Tan felt that the tough guy persona is often used and that there are not a lot of strong female characters seen like Jenny Sparks, Miranda Zero, Jakita Wagner, and Motoko Kusanagi, thus this led to the creation of the main character Alexandra Trese. Growing up in Manila became an inspiration for the setting of Trese, as Tan observed people's superstitions and beliefs such as the saying of 'tabi-tabi po' around a mound of dirt or hanging a garlic on a window to ward off aswangs outside.

== Other Works ==
In September 2011, Budgette Tan edited the comic book adaptation of Tiktik: The Aswang Chronicles.
