= List of Filipino superheroes =

The following is a list of Filipino (Pinoy) superheroes, who have either appeared in Filipino comic books (komiks), television shows (fantaserye), or movies.

== A ==
- A-Gel from Batang X
- Abdullah from "Kuwtmak"
- Adarna from Sandugo
- Afnan from "Kuwtmak"
- Aguiluz from Mulawin
- Agimat from Agimat, Ang Anting-anting ni Lolo and Si Agimat at si Enteng Kabisote and Si Agimat, si Enteg Kabisote at si Ako
- Alakdan from Bayan Knights
- Alamid from Sandugo
- Alamid from the 1998 movie Alamid: Ang Alamat
- Alena from Encantadia and Etheria
- Alexandra Trese from Trese by Budjette Tan (writer) and Kajo Baldisimo (artist)
- Almiro, Prince from The Last Prince
- Alvera, Diwani from Enchanted Garden
- Alwina from Mulawin
- Alyas Aswang
- Alyas Hunyango
- Alyas Robin Hood
- Alyssa from "Kuwtmak"
- Aman Sinaya of the Diwatas (Philippine goddess of the sea; Marvel Comics' Thor & Hercules: Encyclopædia Mythologica)
- Amanikable, god of sea and hunt in Philippine mythology
- Amazing Jay
- Amaya from Atlantika
- Amazing Ving
- Amazona, ally of Batang Z
- Amihan of the Diwatas (Philippine god of wind; Marvel Comics' Thor & Hercules: Encyclopædia Mythologica)
- Amihan from Encantadia and Etheria
- Amulette from Flashpoint
- Angel from Biotrog
- Angel Ace
- Angstrom from Flashpoint
- Anino from Sandugo
- Anitun from Triumph Division and the Diwatas (Philippine goddess of wind, lightning, and rain; Marvel Comics' Thor & Hercules: Encyclopædia Mythologica)
- Anti-Bobo Man
- Apache
- Apo Laki of the Diwatas (Philippine god of day and war; Marvel Comics' Thor & Hercules: Encyclopædia Mythologica)
- Arya
- Aster
- Aquano from Atlantika
- Aquil from Encantadia
- Askal from Sandugo
- Astig from Batch 72
- Ato
- Atom Man
- Atong son of Ato
- Ava Abanico from Super Inggo
- Amy from Zaido
- Andre Lupin
- Asero (Grecko Abesamis) from Codename: Asero
- Asero a.k.a. Hector Zuniga
- Aya / Diwani Olivia from Enchanted Garden

== B ==
- Babaeng Isputnik
- Babaing Kidlat
- Mr. Badassman
- Bagwis
- Bagwis from Bayan Knights
- Bakal Boy
- Balzaur
- Batang X
- Batang Z
- Batch 72
- Bathala of the Diwatas (Philippine god of the sky; Marvel Comics' Thor & Hercules: Encyclopædia Mythologica)
- Bato from Bayan Knights and Sandugo
- Bayan Knights
- Berdugo
- Bernardo Karpio from Sandugo
- Bianong Bulag
- Billy The Dragon
- Binibining Tsuper-man
- BioKid (comic)
- BioKids (movie)
- Biotrog
- Blade
- Blue Turbo Max
- Boga
- Bolt
- Bokutox / Bok
- Botak
- Booster B from Bayan Knights
- Boy Bawang
- Boy Ipis from Bayan Knights
- Boy Pinoy
- Bronco
- Brown-out from Batch 72
- Bughaw (Tabak ni Bulalakaw)
- Buhawi Jack
- Bulalakaw

== C ==
- Calyptus (engkanto) from Panday
- Camia – leader of the vukad (group of female warriors) from Panday
- Captain Barangay Captain
- Captain Barbell by Mars Ravelo
- Captain Juliet Chavez from Flashpoint
- Captain Flamingo
- Captain Karate
- Captain Philippines
- Captain Suicide
- Carlo from Fly Me to the Moon movie
- Cassandra (Warrior Angel)
- Cassandra from RPG Metanoia
- Codename: Bathala from Bayan Knights
- Captain Steel (Earth-2) (Hank Heywood Jr.) from DC Comics
- Computer Man
- Cardo Dalisay from Ang Probinsyano
- Carmela from Zaido
- Chan Lee
- Charlie from Panday Kids
- Claw
- Combatron from Pilipino FUNNY Komiks is a space warrior and protector of Earth.
- Crisval Sarmiento from Resiklo
- Cruzado
- Combat
- Control from Batang X
- Copycat
- Cuatro y medya
- Cyfer from Kalayaan

== D ==
- Dahlia from Panday
- Dalmatio Armas from Carlo Caparas Newspaper Serial
- Danaya from Encantadia and Etheria
- Darna by Mars Ravelo
- Darna Kuno
- Dark Knight
- Darmo Adarna
- Datu, leader of Pintados
- Datu Pag-Asa from Sandugo
- Deathstorm
- Dennis from My Super D
- Davanta from Bayan Knights
- Dinky and the Wonder Dragon
- Diwata from Pintados
- Diwata from Sandugo
- Doc Kuwago from Batang X
- Dodong a.k.a. Super D from My Super D
- Don El Oro
- Dragonna by Mars Ravelo
- Dwarfina
- Dyesebel by Mars Ravelo
- Dyosa

== E ==
- El Indio
- Elias Paniki by Carlo J. Caparas
- Elektro from Puwersa ng Kalikasan
- Enteng-Anting
- Enteng Kabisote from Okay Ka, Fairy Ko! and Enteng Kabisote movies
- Exodus, a mercenary from Exodus: Tales from the Enchanted Kingdom
- Extranghero
- Eman from "Kuwtmak"

== F ==
- Fantasia from Krystala
- Fantastic Man
- Fantastica (old Filipino movie heroine)
- Fantastikids
- Fighter One from Triumph Division
- Filipino Heroes League
- Flash Bomba by Mars Ravelo
- Flashlight
- Flashpoint
- Flavio, the original Panday
- Flavio, descendant and namesake of the original Flavio

== G ==
- G:Boy from Batang X
- Gabriel Black from Bayan Knights
- Gabriel Labrador from Agimat ng Agila
- Gabriella from Flashpoint
- Gagamba
- Gagambino (or Bino)
- Gagamboy
- Galema, anak ni Zuma
- Gandarra from Gandarrapiddo: The Revenger Squad
- Gante from Bayan Knights
- General Star
- Grail (WildStorm) of Wetworks. Symbiote and "chi" energy / EM control.
- Great Mongoose from Triumph Division
- Guiller, replaced the original Panday in Hiwaga ng Panday
- Gwapoman from Bayan Knights

== H ==
- Hadji from Panday Kids
- Hagibis – similar to Tarzan. Created by Francisco V. Coching and one of the first Filipino superheroes
- Haribon
- Hammerman from Victor Magtanggol
- Handog from Bayan Knights
- Hee-Man
- Hiro
- Hugo
- Hunyago, protagonist of a 1992 Filipino film
- Hamza from "Kuwtmak"

== I ==
- Ida from Bayan Knights
- IncrediBelle
- Invisiboy (Filipino Heroes League)
- Ipo-ipo – presumably the first costumed superhero in the Philippines created by Lib Abrena, graphics by Os del Rosario.
- Ispikikay

== J ==
- Japanese Bat
- Jasmina, Reyna from Enchanted Garden
- Jessa (of Blusang Itim) from Super Inggo
- Joaquin Bordado
- Jolas Zuares
- Juan dela Cruz from the television series of the same name.
- Juan Tanga
- Julio Valiente
- Junior from Bayan Knights
- Juro from Ang Panday (2016 TV series) Flavio's descendant from the modern time, and the third to take up the mantle of Panday
- Jawhaina from "Kuwtmak"

== K ==
- Kabalyero from Bayan Knights
- Kabayo Kids
- Kadasig from Bayan Knights
- Kadi from Batch 72
- Kahddim
- Kahimu from Panday
- Kalasag from Bayan Knights
- Kalayaan from GMP Comics
- Kamandag by Carlo J. Caparas
- Kamagong
- Kamagong from Enchanted Garden
- Kampeon (Jimmy Rey, appeared in Kidlat Super Heroes Komiks)
- Kampeon (Super Adventure Komix)
- Kampyon
- Kapitan Aksiyon by Rod Santiago
- Kapitan Awesome
- Kapitan Bandila from Bayan Knights
- Kaptain Barbell
- Kapitan Boom
- Kapitan Kidlat
- Kapitan Kidlat (Leonardo Abutin's character)
- Kapitan Inggo
- Kapitan Pinoy (A superhero character from a radio series on an AM radio station in the Philippines.)
- Kapitan Pagong
- Kapitan Sino
- Karatecha
- Kaupay from Panday
- Kawal from Bayan Knights
- KidLat from Batang X
- Kidlat from TV5's Kidlat 2013 TV series.
- Kidlat (Obet Santos) from Kung Tawagin Siya'y Kidlat
- Kidlat from Pintados
- Kidlat Kid (Filipino Heroes League)
- Kick Fighters
- Kickero
- Kilabot from Bayan Knights
- Kisig Pinoy
- K'Mao from RPG Metanoia
- Knight Hawk (Bolt Gadin)
- Knighthawk
- Kumander Bawang
- Kupcake from Batch 72
- Kuryente Kid
- Krystala
- Kulafu by Francisco Reyes and Pedrito Reyes, presumably the first Filipino superhero
- Kulog from Kung Tawagin Siya'y Kidlat
- Kung Fu Chinito
- Kung Fu Kids

== L ==
- Lady Mantisa, aka Lucy, from Gagambino
- Lady Untouchable (old Filipino movie heroine)
- Lagim
- Lam-Ang from Sandugo
- Lapu-Lapu
- Laser Man by D.G. Salonga (writer) and Abel Laxamana (artist)
- Lastikman by Mars Ravelo
- LastikDog
- Lawin from Ang Alamat ng Lawin
- Leah or Super Bee from Gagambino
- Leather from Bayan Knights
- Leon Artemis from Bayan Knights
- Leon Guerrero
- Liberty Girl from Bayan Knights
- Lieutenant J
- Lilit Bulilit (Funny Komiks 1984)
- Lira, daughter of Amihan and Ybarro from Encantadia
- Lito from Bayan Knights
- Lualhati from Krystala
- Lucia from Dyesebel
- Luna from Darna
- Luzviminda from Bayan Knights
- Lyn Tek from Bayan Knights

== M ==
- Machete
- Magnum from Bayan Knights
- Mananabas from Bayan Knights
- Mang Kepweng (Comics)
- Manila Man from Bayan Knights
- Marella (Earth-2) from DC Comics
- Maria Constantino (Filipino Heroes League)
- Maskarado from Bayan Knights
- Maso from Bayan Knights
- Master Cleu from Encantadia
- Matanglawin from Bayan Knights
- Merza, lady mercenary from Ninja Komiks by Bobby V. Villagracia and Boy Baarde
- Midknight
- Mine-a (the Ynang Reyna), mother of the four Sang'gres from Encantadia and Etheria
- Miguel (Ang Panday 2016 TV Series) Flavio's descendant. The second to take up the mantle of Panday
- Miguel, the protagonist from Sugo
- Mokong from Krystala
- Molave from Enchanted Garden
- Mr. Atlas
- Mysterio from Krystala
- Mira, daughter of Pirena from Encantadia
- Marina
- Mayari of the Diwatas (Philippine goddess of the moon and night; Marvel Comics' Thor & Hercules: Encyclopædia Mythologica)
- Mayumi from Pintados
- Mighty M from Krystala
- Mighty Mother from Triumph Division
- Mighty Ken from Super Inggo
- Mighty T
- Mithi from Bayan Knights
- Mr. Pol (Leopoldo Guerrero) from Tatak ng Katarungan
- Morion from Bayan Knights
- Majeed from "Kuwtmak"

== N ==
- Narra from Sandugo and Bayan Knights
- Nieves, an engkanto slayer from Shake, Rattle & Roll X
- Niño from Bayan Knights
- Ngid also Darno in other Darna reincarnation (Super Action Vol. 2 #12 1999)
- Niño Valiente
- Noah from Bayan Knights

== O ==
- Olen
- Onslaught from Flashpoint
- Oro from Flashpoint
- Overdrive from Bayan Knights

== P ==
- P.I. Joey
- Pag-Asa from Bayan Knights
- Palos by Nestor Redondo and Virgilio Redondo
- Pasa Hero
- Pastor Banal from Bayan Knights
- Patintina from Laban ng Lahi
- Payaso from Flashpoint
- Pammy from Batch 72
- Panday Kids
- Pandoy, the Panday's apprentice
- Pao from Ang Agimat: Anting Anting ni Lolo
- Passion from Flashpoint
- Pedro Penduko by Francisco V. Coching
- Pepeng Agimat
- Perseus the Starlord
- Petrang Kabayo
- Phantom Cat from Bayan Knights
- Phantom Lady
- Pinoy Rangers (Batang X Komiks 1995)
- Pintados
- Pintura from Bayan Knights and Pintura: Panimulang Yugto
- Pirena from Encantadia and Etheria
- Promiteyo
- Pusang Itim
- Puwersa ng Kalikasan

== Q ==
- Quassia, Diwani from Enchanted Garden
- Quattro from Bayan Knights

== R ==
- Raja Team One from Bathala
- Randie from Batch 72
- Rapiddo from Gandarrapiddo: The Revenger Squad
- Raquim from Encantadia and Etheria, is a prince of Sapiro and the father of Amihan.
- Red Feather from Triumph Division
- Red Ninja from Kick Fighter
- Reserve Agent King Agila a.k.a. Agent X44 from Agent X44
- Rocco, ang batang bato
- Royal Blue
- Rubberman
- Ryan from "Kuwtmak"
- Rayan from "Kuwtmak"

== S ==
- Sabina from Majika
- Salakay of Bayan Knights
- Sandata from Sandugo
- Sandugo, a superhero team
- Santelma from Bayan Knights
- Sarhento Sagrado of Bayan Knights
- Scorpio from Sapot ni Gagamba - Kasama si Scorpio
- Sentensyador
- Servant from Bayan Knights
- She-Man
- Sidapa from Sandugo
- Silaw from Bayan Knights
- Sinag from Bayan Knights
- Siopawman by Larry Alcala, may be the first, albeit fumbling, Pinoy komiks superhero
- Sipatos from Laban ng Lahi
- Slick (Filipino Heroes League)
- Snake Force (Cobra, Python, Rattlesnake and Dahong Palay)
- St. George from Triumph Division
- Starfighters
- Starra
- Sumpak from RPG Metanoia
- Super-B (Bilma)
- Super Bing
- Super Delta from My Super D
- Super Idol
- Super Inday
- Super Inggo
- Super Islaw
- Super Gee
- Super Kikay (a.k.a. Super K)
- Super Lolo
- Super Ma'am
- Super Noypi
- Super Ranger Kids (1997 Film)
- Super Talipa, character of a Santo Tomas, Batangas Cable Show
- Super Twins
- Super Wan*Tu*Tri
- Super Vhing
- Supercat
- Superdog
- Supergirl
- Superkat
- Supremo from Sandugo
- Sarah from "Kuwtmak"

== T ==
- Tala of the Diwatas (Philippine goddess of the stars; Marvel Comics' Thor & Hercules: Encyclopædia Mythologica)
- Talahib, a Kulafu-like character by Francisco Reyes
- Talim from Bayan Knights
- Tara Tarantula: The Spider Lady
- Tatto from Pintados
- Taurus
- Tayho, a tikbalang and earth elemental/engkanto from Exodus: Tales from the Enchanted Kingdom
- Teg from Super Inggo
- The Evil Buster
- The Maker (Filipino Heroes League)
- The Twelve, a superhero team by Zach Yonzon
- Three-Na (3-Na) from Batang X
- Tinay Pinay
- Tiny Tony by Mars Ravelo
- Tinyente Tagalog
- Tiagong Akyat
- Tobor
- Tol from Batch 72
- Tonyong Bayawak
- Totoy Bato
- Tough Hero a.k.a. Brix
- Transformer Man
- Triumph Division from Marvel Comics by Matt Fraction and Salvador Larroca
- Tsuperhero (Noynoy), a jeepney driver and berserker in GMA Network's Tsuperhero
- Tsuperman
- Turbo Girl

== U ==
- Urban Rangers – framed cops turned vigilante superheroes with advance equipment
- Unstoppable from Bayan Knights

== V ==
- Valeriana, Diwani (Good Valeriana) from Enchanted Garden
- Varga by Mars Ravelo
- Victor from Victor Magtanggol
- Volta (see also Volta (TV series))

== W ==
- Wang from Batch 72
- Wapakman
- Wave (Pearl Pangan) from Marvel Comics' The New Agents of Atlas by Greg Pak (writer) and Leinil Francis Yu (artist)
- Widad the Loving (Hope Mendoza) of the 99
- Wishing Man from Triumph Division
- Wonder Dabiana
- Wonder Vi

== X ==
- X-Gen (Dr. Javier, Cyclon, Steel, Alamid, Raja, Psi-Lock, Hamok, Seraph)
- X-Man

== Y ==
- Ybarro/Ybrahim from Encantadia and Etheria is the king of Sapiro and heir to the Kalasag.
- Yasmin from "Kuwtmak"
- Yousra from "Kuwtmak"

== Z ==
- Zsazsa Zaturnnah
- Zaido: the Space Sherriffs from Metal Hero Series
- Zaido Blue
- Zaido Green
- Zaido Red
- Zaido Kids
- Zarda (old TV series heroine)
- Zero from RPG Metanoia
- Zheamay from Bayan Knights
- Zigomar
- Zoids
- Zuma, while he is the antagonist in earlier comic book, he is the protagonist in the later serial.
- Z-Man from Batang Z

== See also ==
- Philippine comics
- List of Filipino komik artists
- List of Filipino comics creators
- List of Filipino komiks
