= Combatron =

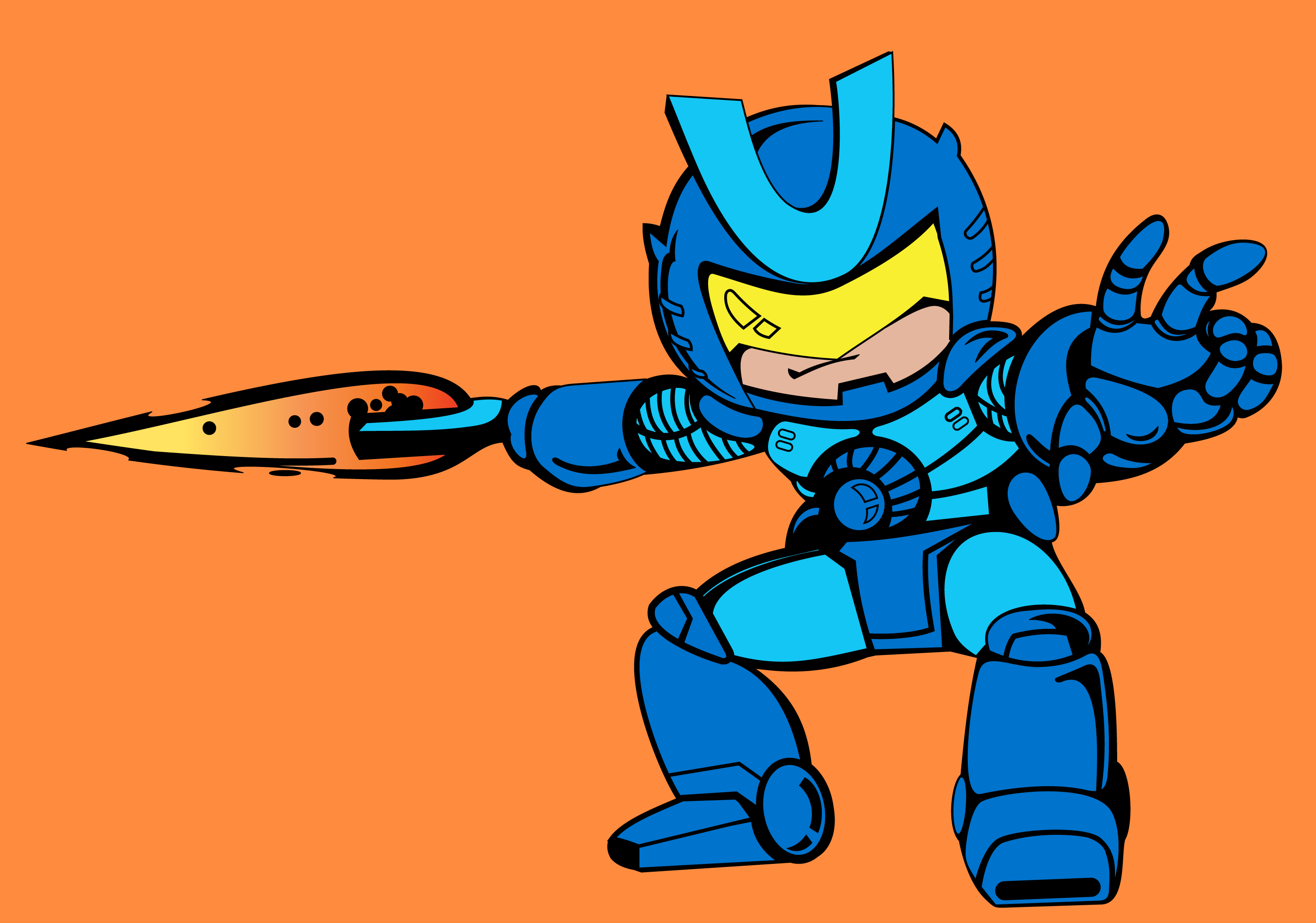
- Combatron's final armor based on the comics

Publication information
- Publisher: Funny Komiks
- First appearance: Funny Komiks (1990)
- Created by: Berlin Manalaysay

In-story information
- Alter ego: Empoy
- Team affiliations: Askal, Axel, Metalika, Dobbernaut, General Kipper, Komikus, Death Metal
- Abilities: armed with Foot Blades, Space Thunder, Nuclear Eye Beams, Galactic Space sword, Galactic Phoenix

Combatron is a Philippine comic series which featured the superhero of the same name. Created by Berlin H. Manalaysay, he first appeared in Funny Komiks in 1990.

== Publication history ==
Combatron is a comic series created by Berlin H. Manalaysay. Combatron first appeared in Funny Komiks in 1990. It abruptly ended on December 15, 1997 with Manalaysay focusing on his career in the advertising industry.

In 2018, Manalaysay disowned the ending stating that he was not involved in the final release back in 1997. A two-part special was released in 2018 and 2019 which was billed as the "true finale" of the saga.

== Plot ==
=== Origin ===
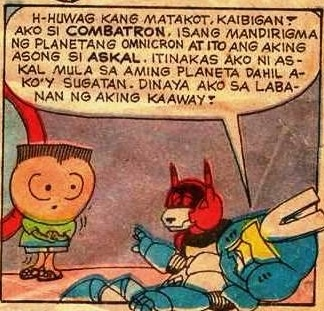
Empoy and the original Combatron

Empoy, an orphaned boy, witnessed a spaceship crash while visiting his parents’ graves. As he approached the crash site, the door of the spaceship opened. Inside was an injured space warrior from Omnicron, a cyborg named Combatron. He came to Earth after he and his allies were branded as outlaws. Knowing that his pursuers were coming to Earth, the dying Omnicronian gave Empoy his armor and the robot dog in his employ, named Askal (Asong Mekanikal).

=== Earth under attack ===
Suddenly, Empoy realized the reason of the spaceship's crash. It was being chased by another ship containing evil cyborg aliens wearing cybernetic armors. They continued their pursuit and found earth and its inhabitants an easy target to be conquered.

Upon landing, they saw the crashed ship and found Combatron, a fight broke out and Combatron gained the upper hand. The villain returned to their base, warning Combatron that their war isn't over and earth will be conquered.

After then, a series of enemies appear to try to defeat Combatron. He defeats them all, until their leader appears. Combatron was defeated by the leader Abo-dawn, and withdraws to get help. Combatron decides to head for Omicron, the homeworld of the Space Warriors. On the way, he was intercepted by Bogus, a subordinate of Abo-dawn who is a master of illusions and was trapped in a video-game resembling various popular video-games. But an all-out attack from Combatron destroys Bogus and neutralizes the illusion.

A double agent under the alias of Komikus secretly aids Combatron in his struggles. Combatron acquires new powers and allies. He then challenges the leader to a rematch and defeats him. But just when it seems the battles are over a new threat appears in the name of Death Metal.

=== New Allies ===
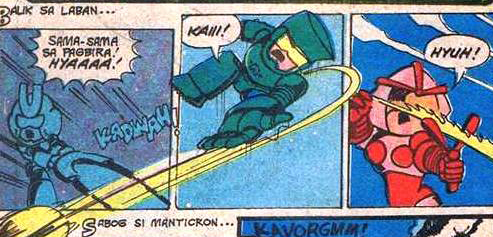
Combatron, Axel and Metalica battling Manticron

Even before the time of Death Metal's emergence, Combatron has lost his first dog sidekick, Askal, to a villain called Diaconda. He was then replaced by Dobbernaut. Two allies of similar armours also emerged. Axel, in green, and Metallica, in red/pink.

=== Unstoppable Death Metal ===
Death Metal is revealed to be the reborn Alchitran, rendered indestructible after being transformed from a comet impact. Searching for revenge against Abo-Dawn and with indirect hostilities against Combatron, Death Metal throws the galaxy into a three-way battle of supremacy.

The new villain also mustered new allies, Quietus, Bracagon, and Helvetica. The sides of war was quickly reduced to two as Abo-Dawn and his forces were easily dealt with by Death Metal. Combatron and his allies, despite fighting valiantly, were also defeated by Death Metal. Combatron used the vortex he was previously sucked into during the battle with a previous enemy (Caligula) and trapped Death Metal temporarily.

=== Upgrades ===
Combatron and company took advantage of their precious time and repaired themselves. Combatron himself underwent an upgrade with hip disks and torso as the most noticeable features. Galactic Thunder and Galactic Phoenix were added powers that would prove useful further on their battles.

=== Round 2 and the "Bigger Enemy" ===
Metallica, on her way to the comet where Alchitran's original body is to be found, was captured by an even newer threat; a planet that calls himself Megadeath.

Meanwhile, Combatron engaged Death Metal once again. This time around, the battle was more of a stalemate. Their fight, however, was interrupted by a strange light that transferred them directly to the planetoid being; Megadeath, who wanted the two combatants to bow to him. With a common enemy, Combatron and Death Metal vowed allegiance to each other.

== In other media ==
=== Film ===
In June 2026, Mavx Productions reportedly is producing a film adaptation of Combatron with Jules Katanyag as the film's writer.

=== Video game ===
A demo for a video game adaptation entitled Combatron: Project Phoenix was released on the Project Indiegogo webpage of Caotic Pixel Studios in 2020. It is a beat 'em up game featuring select characters from the comic.

== Collected editions ==
Title	Volume	Issue	Date
Ang Bagong Combatron at Ang Kanyang Misteryo	Pilipino Funny Komiks	#864	January 6, 1995
Ito na ba Ang Katapusan ni Combatron?	Pilipino Funny Komiks	#909	November 17, 1995
Kakampi na Silang Lahat ni Combatron	Pilipino Funny Komiks	#958	August 4, 1997

== See also ==
- List of Filipino superheroes
