= Red Ninja =

Red Ninja may refer to:

- Kai (Ninjago), also known as the "Red Ninja" a character in Ninjago
- Red Ninja (G.I. Joe), G.I. Joe characters
- Red Ninja: End of Honor, 2005 video game
- The Red Ninja, a Kick Fighter character
