= Samahang Kartunista ng Pilipinas =

The Samahang Kartunista ng Pilipinas (English: Philippine Cartoonists Association) or SKP is an organization of comic strip cartoonists and editorial cartoonists founded in 1978.

== History ==
Its founders, according to the records of the Securities and Exchange Commission, are veteran Filipino cartoonists Larry Alcala, Hugo Yonzon Jr., Gene Cabrera, Edgar Soller, Ed Aragon, Pol Galvez, Tito Milambiling, Renato Santiago, and Boy Togonon.

In 2018, SKP celebrated its 40th anniversary with a kick-off activity at the ComiconAsia at the SMX in March. It also held a Tribute to Larry Alcala Exhibit at the University of the Philippines College of Fine Arts in September. Alcala, SKP founding president, was declared a National Artist by the National Commission of Culture and Arts in October of that year.
