= Bayan Knights =

- Cover art for Bayan Knights, vol. 1 #1. Art by Gilbert Monsanto Edgar Tadeo.

Publication information
- Publisher: Sacred Mountain Publications
- First appearance: Bayan Knights # 1 (September 2008)
- Created by: Gilbert Monsanto; Amely Vidal; Rhoseller Quilantang; Gerard "Rhardo" Fernandez; Gener Pedrina; Juan Paolo Mananita; Paul Michael Ignacio; Gio Paredes; Reno Maniquis; Erico Calimlim; Ray Adrian Necor Magbanua; Joriben Zaballa; Myke Guisinga; Santiago "Santy" Panes; Geoffrey "Borgy" Borgonia; Jeffrey C. Benitez

In-story information
- Base(s): Hidden facility confiscated from a powerful group of syndicates under a secret cabal of masterminds; currently has no official title
- Member(s): Sarhento Sagrado; Phantom Cat; Manila Man; Salakay; Bato, Agimat Warrior; Morion; Boy Ipis; Kalayaan; Maskarado; Pag-Asa; Luzviminda; Liberty Girl; Claw; Bagwis; Servant; Junior; Kapitan Bandila

Bayan Knights is a superhero team from the Philippines. Conceptualized by a group of comic book creators from different parts of the country (and some based overseas) as a collaboration to revitalize the local Comics industry. As per the message posted in their official blog:

Sacred Mountain Publications has gathered in this issue more than a dozen upbeat and talented creators along with their independent studios in one gigantic effort to encourage friendly cooperation and make it possible for these artists to turn their imaginations into reality.

Bayan Knights is considered a benchmark in Philippine comics history as the first title to feature the characters of individual creators while retaining the individual rights to them. An article in the Philippine Daily Inquirer Sunday edition printed on November 26, 2008, was the first to provide media recognition to the project. A second major article was published months after the comics' debut and was reviewed in the February 2009 issue of FHM Philippines.

Bayan Knights was officially created and launched in September 2008 through their DeviantArt page and their blog. A teaser trailer was also posted at YouTube. The Issue #1 premiered during the Komikon 2008 held at the UP Bahay ng Alumni on November 22, 2008.

== Fictional team history ==
After a bloody encounter with powerful underworld forces that left his elite team virtually wiped out, Sarhento Sagrado confiscates the highly advanced facility that they raided. Worried about the safety of his family and determined to bring the masterminds to justice, Sagrado fakes his own death and destroys all traces of the existence of the facility, vowing to use the very resources his nemeses accumulated in the cause of their downfall.

Through the database compiled in the facility, Sagrado determined that the so-called superheroes were key figures in the grand scheme. Needing allies in his 'war' against the underworld, Sagrado sought out and recruited them one by one. Although successful with the 'street-level' heroes, he found it increasingly difficult to locate, let alone convince, the virtual demigods.

Enter the enigmatic Council. Effortlessly bypassing the security protocols of the facility, Council confronted and offered his assistance to Sagrado. Although claiming not to be one of them, Council convinces Sagrado to allow him to recruit the ones he needed.

As the days progressed, Sagrado intercepts information on a vital part of the masterminds' schemes. Still waiting on the response from Council, Sagrado assembles his 'Core' Team to investigate. Once there, they find stasis containment units. Opening one of the units reveals it contained an unidentified female. Before they could determine the vile purpose of the stasis units, they are ambushed by Sipaka, preternatural watchdogs who are sworn enemies of one of their own, Salakay. Managing to fight their way out, they are shocked to discover several hundred more Sipaka awaiting them.

As things turn bleak for the heroes, Sagrado attempts one final time to contact Council. The latter responds, moments before the Powerhouse Team, composed of the most powerful superheroes on earth, descends from the heavens.

In issue #2 the army of Sipakas are easily beaten back by the combined Core/Powerhouse teams. But no sooner as one battle ends the 2 teams become embroiled in separate adventures. Meanwhile, another team is assembled, the Gilas Team to deal with the assault of demonic entities in the metropolis. Behind all this, another mysterious group makes its moves against the growing Bayan Knights membership. At the end of the issue, Sagrado is confronted with the daunting task of unifying the disparate superheroes into a cohesive force. However, his planning is disrupted by the awakening and rampage of the rescued Liberty Girl.

In issue #3 the berserk Liberty Girl causes catastrophic destruction in the Facility with a number of heroes falling to her unbridled fury. Phantom Cat and Luzviminda manage to fight her to a standstill until the young god Servant ends the confrontation. Elsewhere, Maskarado and Kalayaan are ambushed as the Bangis(a conglomerate of super-villains in direct opposition to the Bayan Knights)make their presence known led by a super powerful enslaved superhero Maso.

In issue #4 the Core Team along with a number of Lagalag team up to counter the attack of the Bangis and manage to free the enslaved hero Maso. As Council continues to make his own moves (recruiting members of the TronIX team) the Gilas team assaults the gates of Hell to locate the entity Gabriel Black.

In issue #5, even as the heroes of the Gilas and Halaw Teams succeed in their missions, and members of the Powerhouse Division foil an invasion of The Facility, the plans of the Bangis fall into place, planting a traitor among the heroes' ranks who successfully breaks out the captured villains and assault The Facility.

== Membership ==
Bayan Knights is unique in its organization as it has designated "divisions" but is flexible enough that members can be swapped out depending on the mission specifics.

=== Core ===
The core team From the cover of Bayan Knights #1. Clockwise(from top left): Manila Man, Sarhento Sagrado, Phantom Cat, Boy Ipis, Salakay, Bato, Agimat Warrior and Morion. Art by Gilbert Monsanto and Edgar Tadeo.

The 'Core' Team effectively serves as the reconnaissance and primary investigative unit. Ideally, the team avoids direct aggression, relying more on stealth and subterfuge but has enough brute force to handle most conflicts.

- Sarhento Sagrado - Last remaining survivor of an elite team of law enforcement agents, Sagrado is the founder and de facto leader of the Bayan Knights. He has no extraordinary abilities but has genius-level intellect, extensive training and uses advanced technology/weapons, most evident is his special body armor. Sagrado was created by Gilbert Monsanto.
- Phantom Cat - A young woman caught in an explosion that involved trans-mutative induction on cells. Phantom Cat has been dubbed by the media as 'Panty Cat' due to her affection for wearing revealing costumes. She possesses cat-like agility, a certain degree of super-strength and can become virtually invisible. Phantom Cat was created by Amely Vidal.
- Manila Man - A street-tough brawler, given mystical items notably a barong tagalog that grants a certain degree of invulnerability and a blindfold that allows him to see the aura of living creatures. Manila Man was created by Rhoseller Quilantang.
- Salakay - Raised in the wilds and possesses preternatural senses, strength, speed and agility with the ability to form retractable spurs from his elbows. Salakay was created by Gerard "Rhardo" Fernandez.
- Bato, Agimat Warrior - Granted magical powers by claiming the mutya from the heart of a banana tree. He wields a magical blade and rides aloft a large, flying banana leaf. Also a member of the team Sanduguan. Bato was created by Gener Pedrina.
- Morion - Powered by talisman of iron (Mutya ng Bakal) in the form of a Morion Mask which gives the bearer superhuman strength and durability. Morion wields a massive, but blunt, great sword. Morion was created by Juan Paolo Mañanita.
- Boy Ipis - Mutated with the aspects of cockroaches, Ipis possesses super-strength, agility, the ability to stick to any surface, heightened senses (particularly scent, tactile and taste) and can squeeze his body into far smaller openings. He also possesses a certain degree of regenerative abilities and is virtually immune to radiation. Ipis was created by Paul Michael Ignacio.

=== Powerhouse ===
The Powerhouse Team from the cover of Bayan Knights #1. Top row (from left): Pag-Asa, Maskarado, Servant Middle row (from left): Luzviminda, Bagwis, Liberty Girl Bottom row (from left): Kalayaan, Claw, Council. Art by Gilbert Monsanto and Edgar Tadeo.

As the name implies, this team comprises the upper echelon of superheroes in terms of raw power in the Bayan Knights shared universe, literal "gods amongst men".

- Kalayaan - His powers are a result of massive biochemical augmentation. Possesses vast super-human strength and stamina (which is affected by variations of emotional state, particularly rage). His durability is enhanced by a special costume. Kalayaan was created by Gio Paredes.
- Maskarado - The second Maskarado, he possesses super-strength and the power of flight. The Mask also creates a costume with limited invulnerability, protection from mental manipulation and endows the bearer access to alien martial arts and knowledge. Created by: Reno Maniquis
- Claw - A savage fighter with a mysterious past. Claw has liquid crystal in his veins, which he can use to create crystalline weapons from his arms and hands. In addition, Claw can create portals and is resistant to diseases and the effects of drugs. Claw was created by Myke Guisinga.
- Pag-Asa - The chosen champion of unidentified, mystical forces, he possesses super-strength, super-sonic flight, enhanced durability, and a degree of control of weather. Pag-Asa was created by Erico Calimlim.
- Bagwis - Believed to be an "agent of heaven" whose armor is derived from an angel's wings. Has super-strength, speed, durability, stamina, the power of hypersonic flight and has control of heavenly energies. Bagwis was created by Santiago "Santy" Panes.
- Liberty Girl - A mysterious young woman saved by the team during their first mission. She possesses super-strength, reflexes, telepathic/empathic abilities and telekinesis. Liberty Girl was created by Joriben Zaballa.
- Luzviminda - A living embodiment of the country itself. She has super-strength, hyper-speed, durability, flight and recuperative abilities. She wields mystical armor and an indestructible kris. Luzviminda was created by Ray Adrian Necor Magbanua.
- Servant - A young god. The son of Kabunian, chief deity of the Bathalas and last of his kind. Possesses vast super-strength, speed, invulnerability, faster-than-light flight and command of the classical elements. As a Sky-god he controls weather conditions and wields cosmic energies. Servant was created by Geoffrey 'Borgy' Borgonia.

=== Gilas ===
Composed of heroes with a more "hard core" attitude than the rest of the roster, the Gilas crew are also characterized by the supernatural elements that their members share.

- Gwapoman
- Kilabot
- Mananabas
- Leather
- Kadasig
- Niño
- Santelma
- Talim
- Lito

=== Halaw ===
Whereas Gilas' supernatural elements are dark and gothic in nature, the Halaw team members' origins are based on folklore and fantasy.

- Mithi
- Narra
- Leon Artemis
- Zheamay
- Gante
- Noah

=== Tronix ===
Pronounced "Tron 9", this team is composed of heroes whose origins and powers are based on advanced technology.

- Codename: Bathala
- Kawal
- Kalasag
- Overdrive
- Silaw
- Pintura
- Alakdan

=== Nursery ===
The Nursery is a division of Bayan Knights that was formed to recruit and train young and inexperienced heroes.

- Maso - "Maso", as he was dubbed in the sport of Mixed Martial Arts, gained legendary status and became a cultural icon after a brief but spectacular career in the sport. He retired after gaining a pair of "brass knuckles" of immense powers to fight super powered criminals and was dubbed as "The Fist of Justice". He was recruited by Sarhento Sagrado of the Bayan Knights to be the Nursery's mentor and guardian after he was liberated from Dilim's "contract" that turned him into a super villain for a brief period of time. Though he has not tapped the full potential of his abilities, he possesses immense strength, invulnerability, super speed, the ability to increase his powers ten-fold and increase his size, weight and mass. He uses a pair of Regulator Gloves to help him control his powers. Maso was created by Ramil A. Ibay.
- Booster B - "Booster B" is a fil-am superhero. an athletic cheerleader and genius. She has no superpowers, but has gadgets that can help her fight crime.
- Handog
- Lyn Tek
- Ida
- Junior
- Quattro
- Sinag

=== Lagalag ===
"Lagalag" is not actually a division but rather a designation for heroes who are not actual members of Bayan Knights in an official capacity but have dedicated their service should the need arise.

- Unstoppable
- Devanta
- Kapitan Bandila
- Pastor Banal
- Matanglawin
- Gabriel Black
- Magnum
- Kabalyero

=== Council ===
The mystery man known as Council's role in the Bayan Knights has yet to be fully explored. He has volunteered his assistance and asks nothing in return, claiming to be no more than an 'admirer' of superheroes but his agenda remains an enigma. He has displayed extensive (bordering on encyclopedic) knowledge on the background of super-powered individuals and either possesses superhuman speed or teleportation.
