= John Becaro =

Filipino illustrator and Visual Artist

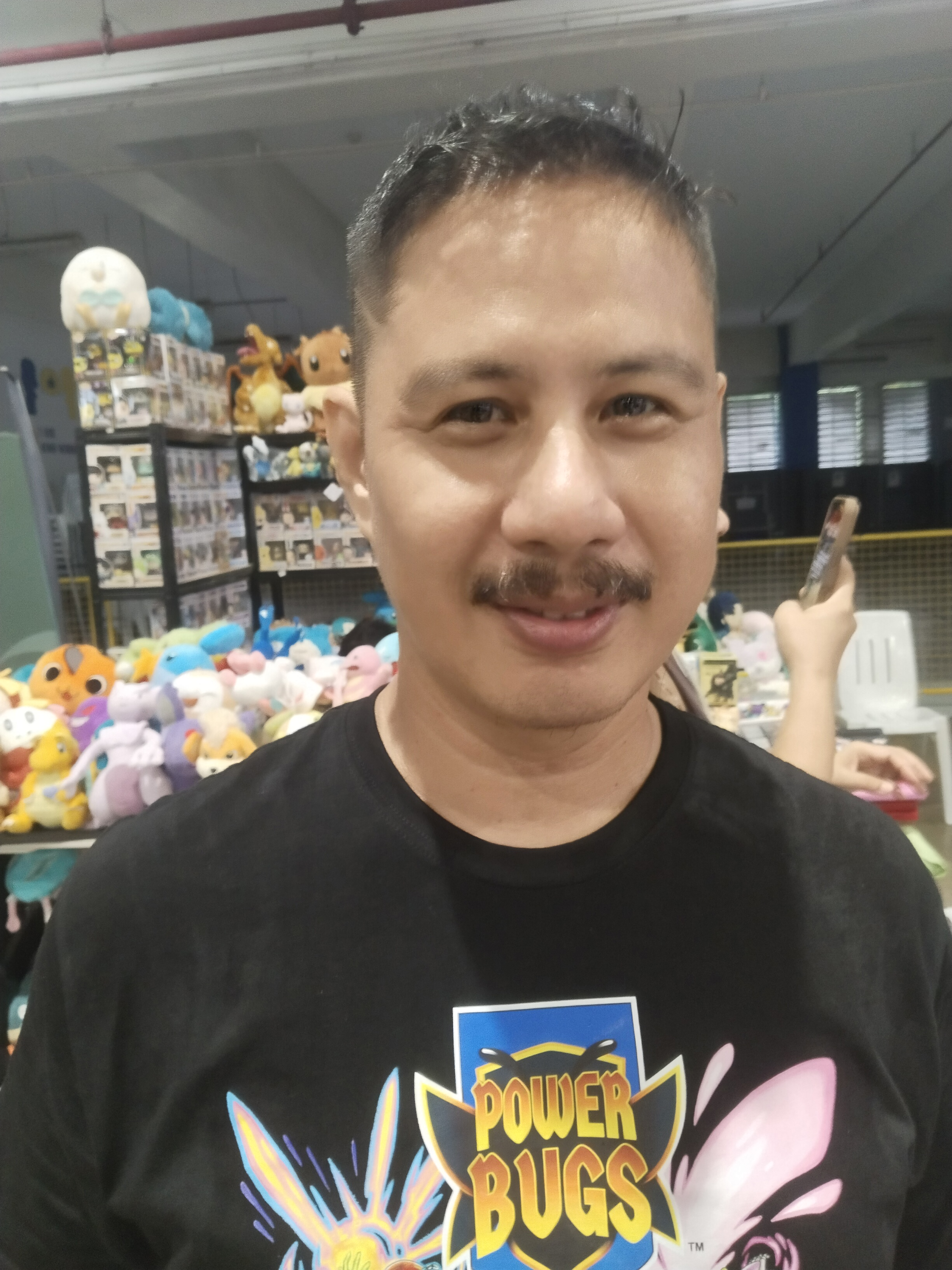
- Becaro at Xavier School ComicCon 2025
- Born: John Alogon Becaro; June 24, 1981; Cadiz, Negros Occidental, Philippines
- Occupations: Visual artist, Comic book artist
- Notable work: Pintura, Power Bugs
- Relatives: Jocel Becaro (spouse)
- Awards: Cadiznon Award 2023
- Website: johnbecaro.wixsite.com/johnbecaro/

John Alogon Becaro (born 1981), is a Filipino illustrator and a visual artist with a passion for digital and traditional illustration. He's published comics artist specializing in cover art, penciling, inking, coloring, and lettering for various local and international publications. He is known for his works in Pintura comics and also being a sketch card artist in various company and organization.

== Early life and career ==
Becaro graduated as Fine Arts Major in advertising at La Consolacion College Bacolod back in 2003. He has made illustrations for Nokia back in 2018 and Toby's Sports for five years since 2011. Now a freelance comics and digital artist, concept illustrator, painter, graphic designer. He is the creator of the graphic novel Pintura Comics and currently works with Marvel, DC Comics, Disney Asia, Finding Unicorn, Universal Studios, Illumination Entertainment, DreamWorks and Curious Creatives as a sketch card artist. He is also a freelance artist for Glasshouse Graphics, an international full-service animation and comic book design studio and of "Typhoon Productions" which is a sketch card company. Also the Conquest Universe, several companies and independent small press publications local and international since 2007.

In 2018 Becaro joined the Venom fan art competition. Venom Team, led by Tom Hardy himself, collaborated with online creative community Talenthouse for the contest. They led the search for works of art made by the character's biggest fans and ended up with over 3,600 submissions from different countries. Becaro became one of the finalists.

== Bibliography ==
=== Comics ===
- Pintura: Panimulang Yugto #1 Vol. 1 (2014)

=== Future works ===
Becaro is currently, working with Power Bugs as the creator-founder. Power Bugs is an all-Filipinos collaborative project by various toy designers, creators, and artists. It aims to build a brand that excites and expands the fictional universes of bugs, inspiring more creativity within the community in the near future.
