= Krystala =

Philippine television drama series

- Title card
- Genre: Fantaserye
- Directed by: Trina N. Dayrit; Rory B. Quintos; Mae R. Cruz; Nuel C. Naval
- Starring: Judy Ann Santos
- Opening theme: "Krystala" by Aegis
- Country of origin: Philippines
- Original language: Filipino
- No. of episodes: 138

Production
- Executive producer: Joan del Rosario
- Running time: 30-40 minutes
- Production company: Star Creatives

Original release
- Network: ABS-CBN
- Release: October 11, 2004 – April 22, 2005

Krystala is a Philippine television drama science fiction fantasy adventure series broadcast by ABS-CBN. Directed by Trina N. Dayrit, Rory B. Quintos, Mae R. Cruz and Nuel C. Naval, starring Judy Ann Santos in the title role. It aired on the network's Primetime Bida line up from October 11, 2004, to April 22, 2005, replacing Victim Undercover.

== Premise ==
The series followed a young woman named Tala, who accidentally unearths a crystal that contained the spirit of the legendary diwata sorceress, Luwalhati, who was imprisoned a hundred years earlier by a devilish being, Harimon. As a promise to Luwalhati, Tala agrees to help her rid the world of evil spirits that, once in the possession or contact of human beings, can bring or unleash corruption and mayhem onto the world.

Knowing that kind of fury would lead to Manila, where most of them would blend into the city's large population, Tala decides to leave her Madulom tribe to move into the area, where she would blend into the mix as a normal working girl, working at a shopping mall.

She would learn, however, that most of the spirits also have ties to Harimon, who was also set free by a young girl named Zorah. (Tala would later learn that she was her mother, who had abandoned her as a child after she became possessed by Harimon.) Upon learning that Harimon and his band of co-horts (The fierce Super Z, female vampire Kamagona, flamboyant drag queen Terracota and shapeshifter Luminax) have resurfaced to unleash and finish the sinister plans to unveil a more evil being bent on taking over the human world, Tala uses her crystal to transform herself into the gold-and-blue clad super-sexy superheroine Krystala and uses her powers to protect those who are helpless... and to protect the people who are her close friends.

== Character background ==
Faith, the daughter of Zorina and Martin de Gracia. When she was little, her family lived in the province far away from the city. One day, the little girl and her parents were being chased. Her mother told her to run far away from home before an evil man named Bacchus, kills the whole family (Bacchus and his men succeeded in killing the child's father and had kidnapped the child's mother).

A couple from the legendary Madulom tribe, Aleta and Joram, found the crying child near the grave of their newly buried daughter. Aleta was thinking that she should adopt Faith even though her husband and the tribes people think that adopting an outsider is unlucky. But since Aleta felt sorry for the child, she chose to adopt and name her as Tala, raising her with the guidance of Ima, the village fairy.

Years later, Tala was walking in the forest until she stumbled upon a secret cave. As she went in, she spotted a crystal that was just standing on a huge rock in the middle of the cave. Then a voice of a fairy name Luwalhati came out from the crystal. The fairy that was trapped in the crystal told her that she was the chosen one, the one anointed by the Mountain's Diwatas (fairies) to save the world by ridding it of evil engkantos (supernatural beings). Tala then picked up the crystal and Luwalhati was released from the crystal. Also, the crystal had given Tala amazing powers and by saying "Sa kapangyarihan ng kristal, ako ang iyong sugo, Krystala!", she was able to turn into the super heroine known as Krystala.

== Reception ==
The show gained a 36% rating on its opening night, cementing Krystala as a successful hit among Philippine televiewers especially in the Mega Manila ratings where ABS-CBN started to lose its hold of the area. This caused many viewers from the channel's rival network, GMA Network, jump to ABS-CBN. It was known that GMA Network would lead in Mega Manila but ABS-CBN still led in the nationwide ratings.

Its highest rating was its 3rd episode, 43.1% and an average of 33.1% (Mega Manila ratings).

== Super Kontrabidas (The Villains) ==
- Emilio Garcia as Harimon - King of All Demons, creator of the red stones (mga pulang bato) which gives powers to whoever possesses one. He retreats after being defeated by Krystala.
- Alma Concepcion as Becca/Kabagona - A woman who has the features of a bat. Kabagona's real identity is a woman named Becca who was punished by Bacchus for a grave mistake, the punishment was being imprisoned in a mystical cave with bats as her only companion. It is from this imprisonment that Becca transforms into Kabagona.
- Michael Flores as Terrence Cortesano Terracotta a.k.a. Badinger Z - A homosexual villain who has the ability to multiply, to scream really loud, to shoot lasers with his magical red stone (in a form of a ring). His real name is an ordinary man named Terrence who "decided" to be gay much to his father's disappointment. As a result, Terrence finds a red stone in a ring which he wears transforming himself into Terracotta. After Krystala defeats him he returns the red stone back to Harimon. He reconciles with his father afterwards.
- Desiree del Valle as Donna/Luminax - A beautiful woman who has the ability to turn into light, manipulate light, and attack with light (ex; light blast, lasers that shoot out of her eyes). She is formerly called Donna who was the daughter of Becca who became Kabagona. She plans to get revenge on Krystala for killing her mother.
- Chin Chin Gutierrez as Super Z / Zora de Gracia - A woman with the ability to absorb the powers of other supernatural beings. She can use the powers that she absorbed. She is revealed to be Tala's mother, Zorah, who sent the young girl off in the forest to hide out of desperation just before she gets kidnapped by village attackers. Years later, in a fight with her new abusive husband, she accidentally reawakens Harimon, who soon possesses her body to gain strength and restart his evil plan. Later on as her own powers manifest, and she is able to separate herself from Harimon. She hides away for a while and eventually starts trying to redeem herself for her misdeeds while Harimon was influencing her. Harimon eventually returns to her again, this time manipulating her with illusions until she breaks and transforms into Super Z, but she is eventually able to overcome his manipulations and force him to retreat, solidifying her on the side of good.
- Angelica Jones as a Flowerette - One of the two villains created in the computer world by Terracotta. Skilled martial artist, their dual attacks proved too much for even Krystala, actually beating her into submission
- Kitkat as a Flowerette - One of the two villains created in the computer world by Terracotta. Skilled martial artist, their dual attacks proved too much for even Krystala, actually beating her into submission.
- Jeffrey Santos as Likido - A man who has the ability to transform into any form of liquid, and can turn things into liquid. Has repeatedly evaded Krystala because of this ability, even discovering her secret identity. He was formerly a ridiculed scientist named Salenga who was performing an experiment until he was exposed in a chemical accident turning him into the villain Likido.
- Manny Distor as Darius the cruel carnival owner with a magic gem that can change peoples physical appearance. He almost drowned in the sea but the stone transformed and gave him super human speed and strength and flight. He battles Krystala numerous times.
- Gabe Mercado as Gravigat - A man who can manipulate gravity. Despite seemingly incompetent at first glance (which may have led Krystala into thinking that she could easily beat him), his powers afford him a tremendous advantage over many foes. In fact, he humiliated Krystala on their first encounter where, after Krystala made her presence known to Gravigat while still hovering in mid-air, he lessened the gravity centered on the heroine's location where she was still hovering, this caused her to lose control over her flight powers, preventing her from landing, trapping her in the air. Gravigat is notably the first villain to be able to use Krystala's powers against her, leaving her defenseless as he made his getaway. The gravity around Krystala only returned to normal after Gravigat left the vicinity. Unfortunately, by this time she had also canceled her own levitation as she attempted to fight the opposing force of anti-gravity that was keeping her stuck unsupported in the air a while back, she fell face-first to the floor.
- Sid Lucero as Sugo ng Dilim - The main villain in the TV series and the leader of the villains.

== Krystala's allies ==
- Ryan Agoncillo as Miguel San Diego
- TJ Trinidad as Gino Salvador
- Angel Jacob as Diwata Luwalhati
- Ama Quiambao as Ima
- Pokwang as Fantasya
- Hero Angeles as Loverboy/Mysterio
- Sandara Park as Kim, Miguel's half-sister
- Kathryn Bernardo as Bullinggit
- Aaron Junatas as Mokong
- Roence Santos as Patotina
- Kristoffer Horace Neudeck as Brutus/Morphino
- Sharlene San Pedro and Mikylla Ramirez as young Tala/Faith

== Extended cast ==
- Spanky Manikan as Mang George
- Menggie Cobarrubias as Atty. Amado Salvador
- Danica Sotto as Kate Salvador
- Susan Africa as Aleta
- Ronnie Lazaro as Joram
- Carlo Aquino as Giwal
- Vanna Garcia as Yagi
- Rey Abellana as Martin
- CJ Navato as Young Igo
- Roy Alvarez as Bacchus Salvador
- Janus del Prado as Adur
- Crispin Pineda as Anito
- Gilleth Sandico as Nali
- Gerard Acao as Tiny
- Gigi Locsin as Martha
- Dido dela Paz as Gen. Cortezano
- Neil Ryan Sese as Rolly
- Idda Yaneza as Belen
- Boyd Tinio as Gaynor
- Arnold Reyes as Lalanilaw
- Ynez Veneracion as Michelle
- Joshua Dionisio as Boy in a car

== Krystala's powers/abilities and items/weapons ==
=== Powers/abilities ===
- Krystal Blast - Energy blasts that shoot out of her hands
- Superhuman strength
- Flight
- Speed
- Krystal shield
- Ability to create earthquakes
- Teleport to other worlds
- Skilled in martial arts

=== Items/weapons ===
- The Crystal (Krystal) - the crystal Tala uses to transform into Krystala and back again.
- Krystal shield
- Bow and arrow
- Blade
- Sword
- Cape - Krystala's cape is near-indestructible, and could contain a mighty explosion if draped over a bomb

== Awards and nominations ==
Awards and nominations
| Year | Award giving body | Category | Nominated work/ Person | Results |
|---|---|---|---|---|
| 2005 | 19th PMPC (Philippine Movie Press Club) Star Awards for Television | Best Primetime Drama Series | Krystala | Included |
| 2005 | 19th PMPC (Philippine Movie Press Club) Star Awards for Television | Best Drama Actress | Judy Ann Santos | Won |

== Soundtrack ==
This is the original soundtrack of 'Krystala'. In the TV series, the theme song, 'Super Krystala', was sung by Aegis, but the Krystala soundtrack featured Sheryn Regis singing the theme song instead.

- Super Krystala - Sheryn Regis
- Yakap Mo - Dianne Dela Fuente
- Ba't Di Mo Pagbigyan - King and Maoui David
- Sana - Mike Empeno
- Shoobee Doo Wop - Sheryn Regis
- Kapangyarihan - Gloc 9
- Sa Pangarap Na Lang - Marinel Santos
- Ikaw Lang Pala - Josh Santana
- If I Believed - Carol Banawa
- Laban Krystala - Gloc 9 with JM
- laban sa kahirapan- von aga

== See also ==
- Sanlakas Kids (Upcoming series that will feature Krystala in a cameo appearance)
- List of Filipino superheroes
- List of telenovelas of ABS-CBN
- List of shows previously aired by ABS-CBN
