= Pintura (Philippine comics) =

Comic book superhero

Publication information
- Publisher: Sacred Mountain Publishing
- First appearance: Bayan Knights Indie Exclusive: Task Force TronIX Issue #1 Volume 1 (2011)
- Created by: John Becaro

In-story information
- Full name: Juan Mag-ingat
- Species: Human (formerly)
- Place of origin: Philippines
- Abilities: Superhuman Ability; Highly intelligent, stamina, reflexes and highly durable; Tactician/Strategist; Shape shifting; Molecular and Substance control; Extreme Regeneration; Espionage; Emits advance chemical compound; Assimilation and analysis; Unique Ability; extra muscles

Pintura is a comic book superhero character created by John Becaro which first appeared on Bayan Knights Indie Exclusive: Task Force TronIX Issue 1 Volume 1 in 2011 and also his stand-alone and origin story series on Pintura; Panimulang Yugto in 2014. Which its series was nominated for 2015 Reader's Choice Award: Comics and Graphic Novels Category.

== Fictional character biography ==
Juan Mag-ingat also known as Pintura was born from the Philippines, with eminent talent in arts. He pursued Fine Arts but shifted to Chemical Engineering because of his uncle's influence. He lived a normal life until one day, a tragic event altered his destiny. It happened in the plant factory where he works as a student trainee. A group of armed men caused chaos and blew up the entire factory. Since Juan's body was not found, he was considered as one of the casualties. His family mourned his presumed death after the blast. A few weeks later, Juan appeared and became the only witness to the terrorist attack. He is going to partake a journey which will reveal a darker and bigger conspiracy.

== Powers and abilities ==
Pintura has a superhuman ability such as extreme intelligent, regeneration, stamina and very durable. he also has the ability to shapeshift and create defensive wall. Using Molecular and substance control on objects. Emits Advance chemical compounds to be used as weapons, also having Assimilation and Analysis. In spite of his strong complex ability, he is a non-combatant and had early stages of schizophrenia.

He had unique ability called "Extra-Muscles" which are yellowish gold body parts and the primary asset/strength of Pintura. They are the integral portions of his undefined biological system that are versatile, flexible, psychedelic, and uncanny. They can extend up to 3 meters and can serve as sentient defense wall. These "muscles" resemble paint as they were originally composed of paint and chemicals mixed together with an unknown element not found in the periodic table but could be somehow classified as one of the Non-newtonian fluids. They can be used as offensive weapons too. The each of end "Extra-Muscle" can be deadly volatile and has explosive result when in direct contact with other surfaces. They can also assimilate certain objects, analyzing data from it and sometimes using it to become their own part.

Meanwhile, the maroon/reddish part of Pintura's body holds the extra-muscles intact and serves as the catalyst when pintura is using his shapeshifting ability. its other features are still a mystery and yet to be explored.

== Supporting characters ==
=== Enemies ===
==== Magaul ====
Magaul once a species of an ancient earth nearly extinct yet vows to protect the planet.

==== Ligumduloms ====
An Invasive alien being who is responsible the chaos and destruction of the ancient Earth.

== Collected editions ==
Title	Publisher	Issue	Date of publication
Bayan Knights Indie Exclusive: Task Force TronIX	Sacred Mountain Publishing	#1 Vol. 1	2011
Pintura; Panimulang Yugto	Pintura Comics Group	#1 Vol. 1	2014

== See also ==
- Bayan Knights
- List of Filipino superheroes
