= Pilipino FUNNY Komiks =

Pilipino FUNNY Komiks or simply Funny Komiks is the oldest running comic book publication for children in Philippine comics history. It first went into print on June 26, 1978. It was published by Islas Filipinas Publishing Co., Inc.

== Description ==
The fully colored regular pages of the Pilipino FUNNY Komiks were bound in between coated book-paper cover. Among the first contributions to the comic book that was 90-percent made up of cartoons were Bing Bam Bung by Larry Alcala, Planet Opdi Eyps by Roni Santiago, Superkat by Leandro S. Martinez, Batute by Rene Villaroman and Vic Geronimo, Darmo Adarna by R.R. Marcelino, Joseph Christian Celerio, and Rey Arcilla. Later contributions were Superdog (a replacement for Superkat) by Christian dela Cruz and Roni Escauriaga, and Niknok (a replacement for Batute) by Pat V. Reyes.

Apart from its cartoon-character contents, Pilipino FUNNY Komiks encouraged the participation of its readers by launching projects such as the publication of drawings created by children, photographs of children taken by parents for the Birthday ng mga Bida (literally "Birthdays of the Stars") section, and the publication of humorous anecdotes written by parents in the My Funny Child pages. In this regard, Pilipino FUNNY Komiks readership became not limited to children alone, but also to adult consumers who enjoyed the contents of the comic book. Thus later on, featured pages for more mature readers had been added such as Fr. Ben Carreon’s jokes column, the educational vocabulary builder Broaden Your Vocabulary section, pages that present idiomatic expressions together with their meanings and sample usage in sentences, and biographies and photographs of outstanding Filipinos.

== Competition ==
In the 1980s, the Graphic Arts Service, Inc. (GASI) published comic books similar to Pilipino FUNNY Komiks, namely the Bata Batuta Komiks, and the For Children Only Komiks.
