= Biotrog =

Publication information
- Publisher: INFINITY Publishing, Inc
- First appearance: Kick Fighter Komiks #1 (1992)
- Created by: Jojo Ende Jr. and Gilbert Monsanto

In-story information
- Alter ego: Roger Summers
- Team affiliations: Dr. Wang, Dianne Mendoza,

Biotrog was a character in the Filipino comics magazine Kick Fighter.

During the early 1990s, the video game Street Fighter was popular in the Philippines. A local publishing company (INFINITY) created a comics parody of the game entitled Kick Fighter. Biotrog created by Jojo Ende Jr. and Gilbert Monsanto was one of the characters that appeared in this weekly comics magazine.

== Biotrog - Kick Fighter ==
Biotrog is a cyborg vigilante that prowls the crime infested city that he is in. Haunted by the murder of his parents, Biotrog patrols against organized crime and other super-powered beings.

=== Origin: The Forgotten Past ===
When he was still a child, Biotrog's parents were involved in an ambush. The story goes that Biotrog's father was a cop named Remy Summers who was working on a miscellaneous case. One night, someone called the precinct he was assigned to, looking for him. Thinking nothing about it, his friend (Bert Hanes - also Biotrog's godfather) told the caller that Remy had just left with his family for a vacation, unknowingly handing his friends' life to the hands of an evil syndicate (KF#18). And so, the family was ambushed by the syndicate's enforcers. They torched the car and left the family for dead. Not knowing that the young Biotrog was still alive.

Unknown to the gunmen a Chinese ex-monk turned scientist, Dr. Wang, witnessed what has transpired. The man was there looking at the site of his new lab and has heard the explosion they have caused. And while the culprits escaped, Dr. Wang was able to save Biotrog. Biotrog's face was badly damaged though. And his (right) arm and legs were amputated in order to save his life. Dr. Wang however, replaced this damaged body parts with high-tech cybernetic artificial organs. Only a postcard that contained the name "Roger" was found along with Biotrog. And because of his bionic body parts, Dr. Wang termed him Biotrog or Bio-Electronic Roger (KF#6) which was later retconned to Bio-Technological Roger (KF#50).

=== Hero With A Silver Mask ===
With the help of Dr. Wang, Biotrog grew up to an honest and kind man. However, his face was so damaged that he had to wear a silver mask whenever he went out of their home. Although disfigured, he has overcome self-pity and is able to help others. On one occasion, Biotrog's encountered a jumper. Believing that no one would ever love him because of his appearance, the man attempted to commit suicide. Biotrog was able to stop him though and upon learning the cause of the man's anguish, showed him his face. Upon seeing this, the man realized his mistake and decided to continue on living (KF#8).

=== Rogues Gallery ===
Throughout the comics, Biotrog crossed path with several nemesis - some are super-powered, some are normal human beings placed in not-so-normal circumstances. The following profiles these enemies and their encounters with our masked hero.

==== The Syndicate ====
Early on the comics, Biotrog was plagued with mind-splitting head-aches whenever he remembers things from his past. He is haunted by a symbol depicting a Hawk's head—the symbol used by the syndicate that killed his parents (KF#6). On one occasion, Biotrog encounters a group having the same symbol. He confides this to Dr. Wang and they realized that the syndicate has two factions. The group that Biotrog encountered had the symbol in their chest while those that Dr. Wang saw ambush his parents had it in the left arm.

It was during the night of the Summers' murder that the syndicate was divided. Iron Claw and his twin brother Ripper fought over the leadership of the organization. Ripper was the current leader of the syndicate but Iron Claw was ambitious. Ripper was finally able to defeat Iron Claw. Although wounded, Iron Claw survived. And as he left the organization, some of its members left with him (KF#15).

- Ripper - leads the original syndicate (symbol in left arm). His main weapon are two samurais. It is also assumed that he has the ability for long distance hypnotism (KF#21).
- Iron Claw - leads the syndicate's splinter group (symbol in chest) and has a knack for robbing banks (KF#26-27).

==== The Red Ninja ====
On a usual night patrol, Biotrog encounters a mysterious red ninja who seems to challenge him for no reason at all. Although an enemy, the Red Ninja allows Biotrog to escape in order to help a woman in danger. Once the fight resumes, Biotrog is able to defeat him. However, before landing more blows on the, Dr. Wang stops the fight and reveals the true identity of the Ninja—an android created to test Biotrog's skills. (KF#14)

==== Biolante: The Prototype ====
After answering a disturbance, Biotrog encounters a mysterious man wielding the same cybernetic claws as his. However, this one had a fiery disposition. Although the two fought, the man escaped. Upon consultation with Dr. Wang, Biotrog learns the man's name Biolante, the first bionic man created by Dr. Wang.

Biotrog views him somewhat as brother. On the other hand, Biolante wants to be one-of-a-kind and wants to kill him (KF#11). Although unsuccessful in his attempts, Biolante appears whenever Biotrog is in danger – much to Biotrog's surprise. The man reasons that if Biotrog will be killed, he will be the one who does it (KF#19). The fights between the two have escalated so much that at one time, Biotrog cut his own arm in order to save himself from Biolante (KF#20).

==== The Monster With No-Face ====
When Biotrog's master, Dr. Wang warned his fellow scientists about the hazards they are doing to the environment, the men just laughed at him and called him paranoid and mad. The scientists reasoned that they have already invented gadgets that will help clean the environment. Not known to them, a new mud-like creature emerged from the wastes that their new gadgets created.

The creature encountered Biotrog while he was on patrol. Attacking him with sonic waves/screams, Biotrog had no choice but to fight back. However, the creature's molecular structure was so unstable that Biotrog's attacks and weapons had no effect. It was only by freezing the creature that it was finally stopped.

Biotrog brought the creature back to their base of operations for containment (KF#17) but it was only a matter of time before the creature was able to escape. During the battle, Biotrog again was overpowered by the creature who used his sonic blasts. However, Biotrog discovered that aside from freezing the creature, it could also be defeated by fire. Using some explosive shurikens, Biotrog was able to defeat the creature (KF#55).

==== Lethal Ninja: Mr. Grey ====
Over the years, Biotrog has turned from a vigilante to an unofficial contact of the police. He has helped capture criminals and solve cases in the city. On one occasion Biotrog was asked to help in guarding the transportation of a murderer named Edmund Grey. Biotrog learned that the Mr. Grey murdered some people as an act of revenge. The people whom Grey killed have stolen from his family and have even raped his two daughters. Although Grey had first let the police handle the case, he found the wheels of justice too slow and had taken the law into his own hands. While on transport, Grey was able to perform an escape. And even though Biotrog pursued him, Grey proved to be a very clever individual and was able to vanish (KF#28).

Some time after, Grey reappeared as a mysterious Black Ninja. Employing master level ninja skills, the ninja was able to defeat Biotrog and told him to blame his master if he is going to die. But before he could finally get to Biotrog, Dr. Wang, disguised as Red Ninja appeared and defeated him (KF#32). This however, did not stop Grey from going on with his path of revenge - kidnapping government officials and assassinating cops and businessmen. These activities did not go unnoticed to Biotrog, in fact, some of these have been done in front of him and Biotrog was unable to stop Mr. Grey (KF#35).

On one occasion, Iron Claw was able to contact Mr. Grey and offered an alliance against Biotrog. With Grey's brains and Iron Claw's resources the two proved to be a good team and was successful in capturing Biotrog. However, once Biotrog, Grey and Iron Claw was in same room, Mr. Grey betrayed Iron Claw, saying that the reason he brought Biotrog was to get rid of Iron Claw. This revealed that Grey believed what he was doing and that he had a sick sense of honor and justice (kF#36-37).

The final battle between the two occurred when Grey tricked Biotrog and was able to capture him. Although, he did not want to hurt the innocent, he viewed Biotrog as a threat. However, it was Grey who was tricked as it was the Red Ninja posing as Biotrog who he has captured. Biotrog appeared shortly and they fought. When it was clear that Biotrog would win the battle, Grey conceded (KF#40-41).

Vowing to stop his revenge, he left the duty of bringing the rest of his enemies to justice to Biotrog. Though reluctant at first Biotrog accepted. Grey has seen the light and was really sorry about what he has done. While on prison, Grey learned about an escape attempt and reported to the authorities. The attempt failed and Grey suffered the consequences of his actions. On Grey's deathbed, Biotrog learned about his final heroic acts (KF#42).

=== Allies: Part Of The Family ===
==== Bernard Grey ====
Although believing the remorse of Mr. Grey to be true, Biotrog did not believe that the clever man would die that easily and on one night, visited Mr. Grey's grave. What he saw surprised him, Mr. Grey was there standing in front of his own grave. He confronted him but before they could exchange words, Ripper appeared.

Unknown to them, Ripper was there to destroy the remains of Mr. Grey as payback. Though at odds with Iron Claw at one time, Ripper wanted to avenge his brother's death (KF#43). Ripper attempted to attack Grey but the man proved to be battle ready. He then revealed that he is in fact, not Edmund Grey but Bernard - Grey's twin (KF#42).

Bernard is also clever like his brother. On one occasion he has helped deal with kid bank robbers by posing as the driver for their escape. While on the way, Bernard released a gas that knocked the robbers cold (KF#46).

==== Angel ====
After some time, Biotrog came across a female vigilante called Angel who surprising saved him from a pinch (KF#10). The female ninja is after a foreign terrorist organization called War Claws. Surprisingly, Angel turns out to be another scientist named Dianne Mendoza. His father invented a secret formula called Formula 1700 which the War Claws stole after killing him. (KF#29)

The two started out with an awkward relationship, Biotrog believing that he had no future ahead of him and had nothing to offer was being distant. Although they told each other about the tragic parts of their lives, the two did not know each other's secret identity (KF#38). When Angel learned the location of War Claws, she asked Biotrog for help. On this mission, Biotrog was caught in an explosion in order to save Angel. It is also in this mission, that Angel sees the man behind the mask.

Biotrog was saved by his bionic parts but the doctors (not knowing Biotrog's history) said they could do nothing about his deformed face. It was during his time that Angel, volunteered to fix Biotrog's face with her technology. She would do this for the man he loves (KF#47).

=== The New Identity ===
During this time, it was Bernard who posed as Biotrog while the latter was recovering from the incident and from the operation that Angel is performing. Bernard has earned the trust of Biotrog and has entrusted him with the duties. And according to Dr. Wang, Bernard was playful but he passed as Biotrog (KF#49). As Biotrog, Bernard uses the same weapon's as Roger. However, Bernard's cybernetic claws are releasable. This proves to be great assets in his battles as Bernard has no bionic parts (KF#51). Once Roger was able to recover, Bernard gave the mantle of Biotrog back to him and turned his sights to the Red Ninja.

Some time after the operation, Biotrog had some disturbing dreams where he was asked about who he was. The person who was asking said that who he was just some information he was told. Biotrog thought it was Biolante but was surprised to learn that who he was fighting was himself. They fought and Biotrog was defeated, his mask punched away from his face. He told him that Biotrog had forgotten who he really was. The other Biotrog removed his mask and revealed Roger's originally deformed face. He said Biotrog hid his true appearance and asked him if they are still same person. They fought again and the other Biotrog destroyed his bionic parts, leaving him helpless and unable to move.

=== Promises Fulfilled ===
Some time after, Angel tells Biotrog that she received information regarding the whereabouts of War Claws. Upon arriving on War Claws' hideout, Biotrog notices some familiar faces. He remembers the promise he has made to Mr. Grey and realizes that they are the enemies Grey has been searching for. Angel tells him that those were some former cops who has turned to crime. In the battle that ensued, Biotrog and Angel were able to wipe out the entire operations of War Claws. Biotrog was able to fulfill his promise to Mr. Grey (KF#53) and Angel was able to retrieve the formula her father had developed.

=== The New Enemies ===
==== Poison Ivy ====
During one of Angel's speaking engagement as Dianne Mendoza, Biotrog and Red Ninja (Bernard Grey) was tasked to guard the scientists attending. Dianne was going to unveil the formula that was created by her father. According to her Formula 1700 is going to end all diseases. However, before she could continue, some of the remaining War Claws attacked. Leading the group is a woman named Poison Ivy whose main weapon is a fan that can eject blades at her opponents. The group attempted to take Formula 1700 from Dianne but Biotrog and Red Ninja were there to stop them. While Poison Ivy was busy dealing with Biotrog and Red Ninja, Dianne was able to change to her Angel armor. And together the three heroes defeated the group (KF#57).

==== Brothers: The Return Of Biolante ====
Unknown to them at a hidden corner of the room, Biolante was watching. The man was supposed to be dead after Biotrog cut his own arm when Biolante refused to let go and attempted to take Biotrog in a fall (KF#20). Biotrog and Dr. Wang were even the ones who laid him to rest. During his return, Biolante exhibited some sort of dual personality and ironically now wears a mask (Biotrog can now walk outside without his own mask).

Biolante's return did not go unnoticed. To make sure that it was really Biolante who mas running amuck, Biotrog (as Roger) and Bernard went and visited Biolante's resting place. The grave was dug up or someone dug out of the grave. Soon after, the two were attacked by Biolante who at that time did not recognize either of them. He told them to tell Biotrog that he is issuing a challenge (KF#66). When Roger returned as Biotrog, the two finally squared off. Biolante exhibiting some new moves and a Beta Beam firing from both his eyes. When he got the chance, Biotrog used his silver mask to reflect the beam back to Biolante who was knocked unconscious, but was suddenly transported away by some unknown force (KF#67).

Some time after, Biolante contacted Biotrog in order to finish their business once and for all. He told Biotrog the real reason why he hated him so much. He was Dr. Wang's first protege and was introduced to Roger soon after his rescue. He grew up and was assigned as an assassin for an international intelligence unit. He was loyal but as soon as he failed a mission, he was sent to jail and cast aside even by Dr. Wang, a person he views as a father. He also told Biotrog that Dr. Wang erased all of Biotrog's memory regarding him.

But before any more explanation can happen, Biolante was not able to contain his anger and attacked. Although Biotrog had the upper hand, Biolante soon revealed his trump card. The real cause of his resurrection was an alien entity that possessed his corpse. With this alien entity fighting with him, Biotrog's bionic strength was no match. It was only with the intervention of Dr. Wang that Biolante decided to stop and leave his revenge for another day (KF#61).

==== Koji ====
Ripper invited an assassin named Koji to help him defeat Biotrog. But as it turns out Koji was there to not only kill Biotrog but also kill Ripper himself. A task which he accomplished flawlessly. And using intimidation, Koji was able to take control of Ripper's organization. The next day, Biotrog was called by the police to help investigate a crime scene. Upon arriving Biotrog was shocked to find Ripper's dead body hanging on the wall. Red Ninja who tagged along noticed that the wall clock had the wrong time and immediately asked everyone to get out. They were barely outside before a huge explosion from the room erupted (KF#58).

The next time Koji made an attempt on Biotrog's life was when he had one of his men rescued by Biotrog from a supposed stab wound. The man while on transport to the hospital planted a bomb on Biotrog's motorcycle. Much to their dismay when Biotrog grew suspicious and was not on the motorcycle when Koji detonated it (KF#46).

This caused Biotrog to finally decide to take out Koji and the remains of Ripper's syndicate. With the help of Red Ninja, they were able to trick Koji into thinking that they were going to infiltrate his stronghold. Koji decided to blow his hideout when Biotrog and Red Ninja were sure to be inside. And while Koji and his group waited outside contemplating their victory, Biotrog and Red Ninja appeared with some cops in tail. Not accepting defeat, Koji challenged Biotrog and during the ensuing confrontation lost his left foot via Biotrog's cybernetic claws (KF#70-71).

==== The Black King ====
Unknown to them a new syndicate has been formed. Led by a man known only as the Black King, the group's membership is solely based on the pieces of the game of Chess. It includes the beautiful and dangerous Black Queen—whether she is the king's lover or just a follower is not known, two former bishops that have turned to crime, two sadistic killers as knights and the eight newly recruited men as pawns (KF#62).

The group's first task is to eliminate the vigilante known as Biotrog. Unknown to them, one of the group's member is really not in league with them. And as the two knights who were sent to kill Biotrog prepared to finish the task, shurikens thrown from somewhere stopped them. And because of the diversion, Biotrog was able to stop and defeat them (KF#64).

Some time after, the group baited Biotrog with a false tip so that they can capture him. Unfortunately for them, Biotrog wanted to be captured and as soon as he has escaped from his binds, Biotrog proceeded to take them out. However, Black King had an ace up his sleeves. He released some poisonous gas when Biotrog was close enough. He left Biotrog to die but soon discovered that that was a huge mistake. As it turns out, the traitor in their organization fed Biotrog the antidote to the poison. Biotrog went after them and was able to stop their activities (KF#82).

==== The Resurrection Of No-Face ====
When a man turns up dead on a gallery, Biotrog investigates to find mud-like substance all over the crime scene - and only one creature comes to his mind, No-face. It seems that Biotrog was not able to fully destroy the creature with fire the last time they met and it was able to reform itself. Biotrog along with Angel goes back to crime scene to investigate further but soon finds out that Biotrog's initial hypothesis is true. Same as their battles before, Biotrog is powerless against the creature's physiology. He also cannot freeze the creature or use his explosive shurikens since the creature has captured Angel. As fate would have it, Biotrog is able to find a fire hose and blast the creature with water, dissolving it. Biotrog and Angel then brings the creature's remains back to the base for containment (KF#78).

Several weeks later, Dr. Wang had come to the conclusion that the remains of No-face can now be safely disposed. With Biotrog, they went to the edge of town where they disposed the liquid remains of No-Face. However, an escaped prisoner happened upon the area. Thirsty from the police-chase, the prisoner drunk from the river where some of No-Face's remains rested. Moments later, the prisoner lost consciousness. When he awoke, he was shocked to see that he was transformed into No-Face. Along with the appearance, he also inherited No-Face's dislike towards Biotrog (KF#84). With No-Face's memories, he was able to find Biotrog's lair and attacked. Fortunately, Dr. Wang had a flame thrower lying around. He torched No-Face, not realizing that someone was trapped inside (KF#85).

When Angel finds dried blood on the surface of No-Face's body, Dr. Wang decided to test the creature. During the tests the creature regained consciousness and for a while had the personality of its human host. Biotrog and Dr. Wang were shocked as the creature spoke but were even more shocked with the creatures new strength as it escaped. Dr. Wang had realized that the creature had a human host and asked Biotrog to find the creature (KF#87). During their encounter, Biotrog used nitrogen capsules to freeze No-Face. To his surprise the prisoner that No-Face bonded with asked for his help. He however could do nothing but bring back the frozen creature to their base as they still had no idea how to separate the two (KF#88).

=== Bernard Grey: Black Ninja ===
Bernard receives a package from his parents. But as it turns out, this was an attempt on his life by his enemies in Japan. The package contains Ninja Death Powder, a substance that can cause instantaneous death to anyone who touches it. Biotrog offers his help but Bernard declines saying that Biotrog is needed where he is right now. Soon after, Bernard leaves to face his enemies in Japan (KF#76).

=== Triple Threat: Biotrog vs. Biolante vs. Koji ===
While in prison, Koji had nothing in his mind but Biotrog. He wished to once and for all destroy his enemy. As if fate intervened, Koji's wishes were about to come true because hovering above the city is an alien spacecraft containing the same alien specie that resurrected Biolante. Using their advanced technology, Koji was transported to the alien craft where his foot was replaced with cybernetic parts. The alien intended to make him his slave like Biolante to his brother. Koji refused and was able to escape, damaging the space craft and killing the alien creature in the process (KF#79).

Biolante on the other hand was turning a new leaf. While Biotrog was on patrol on another part of the city, Angel was battling the War Claws. Due to the sheer number of her opponents, Angel was defeated and captured. But before they could do anything else to the woman, someone appeared and took out her enemies. At first, Angel thought it was Biotrog but it turns out to be Biolante. He explains that it is Biotrog who is his enemy and not her. Angel offers that he return to the side of the law, but Biolate says that the law has no longer any room for him (KF#80).

When it came to the time that Koji finally confronted Biotrog, Biolante was also there to inflict some damage. Unfortunately for Koji, Biolante doesn't want Biotrog to be killed by anyone rather that him so he watches Biotrog's back from Koji's attack. This doesn't mean that he didn't attack Biotrog in the process. In the end, Koji decided to eliminate the two but by this time, Biotrog and Biolante decided to make their fight a draw and get rid of Koji instead (KF#86).

To get back at Biotrog, Koji sold drugs while pretending to be Biotrog to damage his name. Biotrog was quick in thwarting his plans though, as when Koji thought that he had finally won, Biotrog appeared and defeated him (KF#91). Koji realizing that he isn't any match for Biotrog in his current state asked for help from the dark arts. His prayers were answered by a dark deity who gave him telekinesis (KF#93).

On a nightly patrol, Biotrog received a telepathic message from Biolante. And when they found each other, the two instantly fought. Biolante provoked Biotrog to chase him. Biotrog seeing the new quickness in his opponent became suspicious. His suspicions were confirmed, when Biolante was not affected by some gas he had released. He realized that it is not the real Biolante and destroyed it. It was an android created by Biolante with the help of the alien that was bonded to him to lure Biotrog into a trap (KF#89). Not satisfied with his defeat, Biolante sent another android disguised as the late Mr. Grey to kill Biotrog. However, like the previous battle, Biotrog was able to realize the difference in his enemies and was able to defeat it (KF#90). Ironically, Biolante needed the help of Biotrog when he was captured by a cult that attempted to sacrifice him (KF#93).

After some time, Biolante became fed up with the alien who was instructing him to create more androids to kill his enemies. Biolante said that if anyone will be killed, he will be the one who does it. The alien fought back and Biolante who was naturally hot-tempered, destroyed the alien's computers and apparatuses. He had already decided to kill himself to finally shut the alien up. He injured his hand and the alien was able to get out, only to be welcomed by an explosion due to the damage created by Biolante. The alien was no longer able to reform itself and some of its DNA mixed with Biolante's blood (KF#94).

Now free from the alien, Biolante turned his sights to Koji who was always meddling with his affairs. Unknown to him, Koji had decided on the same thing. It is easy for two who are looking for one another to cross paths. When this time came, Biolante and Koji fought ferociously, first with their fists and blades. Biolante wielding that same cybernetic claws as Biotrog and Koji his trusty assassin's samurai. But when this had no clear winner, Biolante used his Beta Beams, this time firing from both his hands. Koji retaliated by attempting to drop a car on Biolante using his telekinesis. This battle became a no-contest when Koji escaped and Biolante was left frustrated and screaming (KF#98).

=== The Death of Biotrog ===
A mysterious man named Yondabis issues a multi-billion man-hunt against Biotrog, contacting several of his enemies like the Kings of the Street, Black King, Koji and the War Claws, Akuma and Biolante (KF#113). The first attack came from the War Claws, shooting an energy weapon at Biotrog while he was on patrol. Narrowly escaping, Biotrog does not see Koji attacking with his sword, drawing first blood. Biotrog fights off Koji, eventually knocking him out. He is then shot by the King of the Street's Beret at almost point blank range, starting another fight. Although injured with a sword and gunshot wound, Biotrog eventually beats Beret (KF#114).

Not long after his win, Biotrog is attacked by Akuma. Feeling the effects of the previous battles, Biotrog uses his telekinesis to push Akuma away, not noticing two of Black King's pawns behind him. Held by the pawns, Akuma attacks Biotrog causing his mask to be removed. Escaping the pawns, Biotrog counterattacks breaking Akuma's sword with his claws. Walking away from the battle, Biotrog finally encounters Yondabis who was waiting for him. Biotrog recognizes Yondabis and is surprised to learn that he is the mastermind behind the attack. Biotrog furiously attacks but Yondabis makes short work of our battered hero declaring that he is weak and that Dr. Wang only has one son (KF#115). Biotrog lays bloody and unconscious on the ground. Yondabis tries to make sure that Biotrog is dead but is forced to leave when he hears police sirens nearby. The police capture all the criminals that Biotrog previously defeated but only finds Biotrog's broken emblem on the ground.

News of this spread with the media reporting the hero dead. At their base, Dr. Wang confesses to Bernard and Angel that he thinks that his son Yondabis is behind this before being interrupted by loud noises coming from their lab. Upon inspection, Angel discovers Formula 1700 missing. It is later revealed that the thief is no other than Biolante. He brings the formula to his base where he is also keeping Biotrog's missing body. Meanwhile, elsewhere in the city, Yondabis expresses his jealousy over Dr. Wang's favoritism of Biotrog when they were young. Fashioning his own dark version of the suit, Yondabis assumes Biotrog's identity (KF#116).

Yondabis as Biotrog later attacks the city. Angel and Bernard as the Red Ninja tries to stop him but Yondabis fights them with ease declaring that they will follow Biotrog in death. He defeats Bernard knocking him down and begins taunting Angel calling her sweetheart. "She is not your sweetheart," a voice from behind him say. Yondabis turns and see the new and improved Biotrog standing before him. Biotrog quickly springs into action attacking Yondabis. With Angel, Bernard and Biolante cheering him on, Biotrog defeats Yondabis telling him that he always considered him as a brother. At this time, Dr. Wang appears to talk to his son and clear the issue between them. In the end, Yondabis leaves to pursue his father's wishes for him (KF#117).

== Blades and Bullets ==
"Blades and Bullets" logo. Art by Gilbert Monsanto

Several years after its first publication, Infinity Publishing decided to cut back on Kick Fighter's production cost. Revamping the titles which appeared in the comic and renaming the magazine Kick Fighter II, a reshuffling of characters happened which led to other Kick Fighter cast appearing on Biotrog stories. Most notable of these were the secret agent Jolas Suarez (KF's version of Ken Masters) and the outworlder Voltar (KF's M.Bison). The former became his crime-fighting partner, thus the re-titling to "Blades and Bullets". The series was written and drawn by Biotrog co-creators Jojo Ende Jr. and Gilbert Monsanto.

=== Teaming Up ===
The series starts with the outworlder Voltar, fresh from his battle with longtime rival Balzaur, crashing towards Biotrog's prowling grounds. Seeing the trail created by Voltar's descent, Biotrog quickly moves to investigate. However, on the way to the crash site, Biotrog is jumped from behind by an unknown assailant who quickly disappears after the attack (KFII#118). As a result, Biotrog arrives late on the scene with Voltar already awake from the crash. The two are quickly involved in a melee where Biotrog gains the upper hand due to Voltar wielding less power than usual. However, as he is nearly winning the fight, Biotrog is again attacked by the same assailant as earlier, now revealing himself to be the sociopath Bushido (KF's E.Honda) (KFII#119).

Bushido's goal is to recruit Voltar to his cause and Biotrog is in his way. The two fight while Voltar, amazed at the turn of events, decides to hold back and kill whoever is left standing. The battle raged on and Bushido overpowered our bionic hero. But as he was about to deliver the final blows, Bushido is shot on the arm by a newly arrived Jolas Suarez. Realizing that his enemies were increasing and that his own powers are somewhat malfunctioning, Voltar decides to escape taking Bushido with him. Biotrog who was injured from the battle is taken to the hospital by Jolas (KFII#120).

When Biotrog wakes up, he is informed that he and Jolas must work together to catch Voltar and Bushido. However, upon hearing this, Jolas who has come to the city on Bushido's trail loudly disagrees prompting a shouting match with Biotrog. In the end, Biotrog leaves the hospital on his own. The two weren't the only ones having some issues. Somewhere in the city, Voltar and Bushido were also having a fight - Bushido going as far as trying to use a mind control device on Voltar. Unfortunately for Bushido, Voltar uses the device on him instead (KFII#121).

The villains attack Jolas who is patrolling the city alone and with Bushido's strength and Voltar's electromagnetic powers, the two quickly gain the upper hand. But as Voltar was posturing, Biotrog appears and repays Jolas by saving him this time around (KFII#122). Jolas shoots Bushido with a stun gun which negates the effects of the mind-control device. As a result, Bushido quickly turns his attention and attack Voltar. Voltar realizing that the mind-control device no longer works quickly dispatches Bushido with his powers. Biotrog takes advantage of this situation and attacks Voltar. Voltar tries to fight back but Jolas also attacks declaring that he and Biotrog are now allies forcing the villain to flee in defeat (KFII#123).

=== Rivalry ===
Though they agreed to become crime-fighting partners, Biotrog and Jolas can't help but get into arguments and pissing contests regarding each other's methods. On their first mission together, Biotrog leaves Jolas alone to execute his own plan against the drug runners they were going after (KFII#125). However, they would just as easily put their differences aside in more extreme situations like fighting Voltar (KFII#128-129) or separating No-Face from his host (KFII#127).

The most notable effect of this rivalry is Roger Summers (the alter-ego of Biotrog) and Dianne Mendoza (the alter-ego of the female ninja Angel) finally tying the knot. One day, Biotrog finds Jolas hanging out with Angel in her civilian identity. Angel tells him that Jolas has invited her to the mall and both leave. Biotrog follows them around and becomes jealous. He confronts Jolas declaring to all that he is the man that Angel will marry. Soon after, the two wed with Biolante even in attendance (KFII#133).

== Omni Powers ==
Infinity suddenly ceased publication of Kick Fighter II (and their other books) and when they returned with Kick Fighter III, titles and characters from their other books also populated the comics magazine. Blades and Bullets was replaced with "Omni Powers" which was still written and drawn by collaborators Jojo Ende Jr. and Gilbert Monsanto and starring KF characters Biotrog and Jolas Suarez who are joined by the Galaxian Knight Balzaur (KF's Balrog) and lady adventurer Nerva (KF's Cammy).

=== Power Link ===
The series starts almost the same as the previous one: with an object crashing towards Biotrog's turf. Biotrog and Angel see this during their date and assumes it is a comet. Biotrog, who at the end of the previous series was being taught about primal energy by Dr. Wang, tries to intercept and destroy the comet with his new cosmic blast but it does not work. Soon after, Jolas arrives at the scene and the two attempt to destroy the comet by combining the cosmic blast with Jolas' Haduken. This time, the target evades and they discover that the comet is not a comet but a life form (KFIII#2). The creature attacks them but with Biotrog and Jolas' combined efforts, they were able to knock it down. Taking a closer look, Biotrog realizes that the creature looks familiar. However, before he can speak any further, the creature hits both him and Jolas declaring that they are now even. The creature is the Galaxian Knight, Balzaur and he needs their help (KFIII#4) and another - Nerva, who they help fight off thugs (KFIII#5).

=== Diabolus Crystals and Diabolic Foes ===
The threat to the planet that Balzaur needs their help to fight are the Diabolus crystals. Diabolus was a planet of pure evil and thus was destroyed by Balzaur's boss The Watcher. It was a mistake as the remnants of the planet scattered across the galaxy. Anyone who comes in contact with these Diabolus crystals gain incredible power and becomes pure evil (KFIII#7). It is also capable of animating machines (KFIII#31) as well as reanimating the dead.

==== Cain ====
Cain was a thief who was shot and killed by the police in front of his twin brother's house. Witnessing his death caused his twin brother Abel to lose his mind, creating a second persona who claims to be Cain (KFIII#8). Soon after, Abel comes into contact with a Diabolus crystal that fell from the sky transforming him into a monstrous creature. Nerva who followed the crystal's path encounters Abel's monstrous form with the Cain persona dominant (KFIII#9). The two battle it out with Nerva gaining the upper hand via the use of her self-duplication powers. Cain tries to trick Nerva by manifesting the Abel persona before resuming his attack. Unfortunately for him, Nerva was ready and blasted him (KFIII#10). Upon losing consciousness, Cain transforms back into Abel (KFIII#11).

==== Brainwash ====
Brainwash was a scientist who was hungry for knowledge. Upon coming into contact with a Diabolus crystal, he becomes hungry for knowledge literally (KFIII#12)! Brainwash has the ability to fire eye beams that causes a target to lose his mind. An ability Biotrog discovered when Brainwash's beam hit a dog who then began purring like a cat (KFIII#13). Although Biotrog defeated Brainwash with his cosmic blast, no body was ever found (KFIII#14).

==== Diabolic No-Face ====
Upon separating him from his then host, Biotrog kept the remnants of No-Face secured in a canister at his base. But when Balzaur unknowingly placed a Diabolus crystal near the canister, No-Face reformed attacking Jolas, Balzaur and Nerva while trying to escape (KFIII#15-16). The three had a hard time fighting No-Face's sonic blasts and improved intelligence. The creature was only stopped upon exposure to the scent of Angel's bottled perfume (KFIII#17).

==== Masaker ====
The man who would become Masaker wasn't transformed instantaneously as the other Diabolus hosts. He just picked up the crystal from the pavement because he thought his wife Delia would like it. However, upon arriving at his house, he discovers his wife Delia having sex with another man. This is when the crystal transforms him into Masaker and he kills his wife and her lover (KFIII#18). Biotrog encounters Masaker while on patrol. At first Masaker mistakes Biotrog for an agent of Diabolus and attacks him when he learns that he is not (KFIII#19). It took the combined efforts of Biotrog, Nerva, Balzaur and Jolas to defeat Masaker. But still, no body was found (KFIII#20).

==== Diabolic Biolante ====
After his latest defeat at the hands of Biotrog, Biolante is struck by a falling Diabolus crystal. Upon his transformation, Biolante declares that "Biolante" is dead and that he and Biotrog are no longer brothers. Later, he waits and kills a newly risen Diabolus-resurrected Koji (KFIII#28-29). He then forms a counter team of Omni-Bandits consisting of ex-Galaxian Knight and Diabolic host Domo, Nerva's friend and the recently converted Black Jaguar and a mysterious fourth lady member named Poison (KFIII#30). However, Kick Fighter III ceased publication before the two teams ever met.

== Other Appearances ==
=== Digmaan ===
On his blog, Biotrog co-creator Gilbert Monsanto has a free webcomic called Digmaan that brings together most if not all of the classic Filipino super heroes like Captain Barbell and Darna. The comic also features appearances from popular 90's comics icon Biotrog and Combatron. The series is unofficial and can be considered a work of fan-fiction (at least for characters who he did not co-create). The story is ongoing.

=== Metropolitan ===
Rambol, a comic book released by Sacred Mountain Publications owned by Gilbert Monsanto, features a series called Metropolitan. This series showcases Monsanto's creations/co-creations from his stint in the 90's comic publications: GASI, Infinity and Sonic Triangle. The story is ongoing.

=== Biotrog Reassembled ===
In 2010, Gilbert Monsanto posted an artwork on his blog hinting at a future reappearance of Biotrog. The artwork contained the text: Biotrog Reassembled.

== Costumes ==
When Biotrog first appeared, he had a similar attire to Street Fighter's Vega (Balrog in Japanese Versions). He wore the same pants albeit different colors. Vega uses gold and violet while Biotrog's was white and blue. For the upper part of his costume, Biotrog wore a single shoulder pad to protect his then normal arm. His cybernetic arm was also covered with synthetic material, enabling it to blend with his normal skin. His mask had an eagle's claw drawn on its left side. He also wore a similar symbol on the strip of leather he wore instead of Vega's snake tattoo.

After Biotrog returned after he was supposedly killed by Yondabis and his allies. Biotrog's attire changed to the one shown at the top of this page. The eagle's claw on his mask has been removed. Instead, the lower half of his mask was changed to black. He however, still had the symbol on the leather strip he wore. The shoulder pad also moved to his other shoulder which connected it to the leather strip. Also this time, both his cybernetic arms are shown. He also changed his pants to something that covered his legs entirely - including his feet. The design also changed. Instead of having equal white and blue colors, the lower part of his legs were entirely covered in white. Aside from these, his pants also had a variation of the eagle's claw. His hair style also changed as he no longer ties his long mane.

== Powers and abilities ==
Trained by Dr. Wang since he was a child, Biotrog possesses advanced level martial arts skills. Early in the comics, only one of Biotrog's arm was cybernetic. This arm contains a set of retractable cybernetic claws much like that of the X-Men's Wolverine. However, during an encounter with Biolante, Biotrog was forced to cut his other arm in order to remain alive. Since then, Biotrog had his arm replaced and thus now wields two sets of cybernetic claws. His cybernetic parts also gives him the strength of six men. Aside from these, his bionic legs allows him to run faster than ordinary human beings.

It seems that Biotrog has some undeveloped telepathic and telekinetic abilities. There have been some instance in the comics when Biotrog moved some objects using his mind (KF#5) and communicate telepathically with Biolante (KF#12). It isn't clear if these are still true. This may have even been retconned out of existence.

== Behind The Scenes ==
Jojo Ende Jr. was asked to choose a character from a number of images and he chose Vega whose name was listed as Balrog. He had to coin a same-sounding name, hence, Biotrog. After writing the first script, he was introduced to Kick Fighter would-be editor Edgar Coloma.

Meanwhile, Gilbert Monsanto was already ready to quit comics and was on his way out of GASI when he was stopped by Ariel Pineda (Ispikikay) who told him that a new komik magazine is being launched. They went to Edgar Coloma who handed Mondanto a photocopy of an image of the character he would be handling as well as the script from Jojo Ende Jr. At the time, Monsanto was unaware of the arcade game Street Fighter and based Biotrog on Marvel characters Spider-Man and Iron Fist, as well as a gladiator.

== See also ==
- List of Filipino superheroes
