= Pintados (TV series) =

Philippine television drama series

- Title card
- Also known as: The Painted Ones
- Genre: Action drama
- Developed by: Don Michael Perez
- Directed by: Mark A. Reyes V
- Starring: Angelika Dela Cruz; Michael Flores; Assunta de Rossi; Vandolph; Sherwin Ordonez
- Theme music composer: Francis Magalona
- Opening theme: "Pintados" by Francis Magalona
- Country of origin: Philippines
- Original language: Tagalog
- No. of episodes: 52

Production
- Executive producer: Wilma Galvante
- Camera setup: Multiple-camera setup
- Running time: 60 minutes
- Production company: GMA Entertainment TV

Original release
- Network: GMA Network
- Release: September 4, 1999 – September 2, 2000

Pintados (international title: The Painted Ones) is a Philippine television drama action series broadcast by GMA Network. Directed by Mark A. Reyes V, it stars Angelika Dela Cruz, Michael Flores, Assunta de Rossi, Vandolph and Sherwin Ordonez. It premiered on September 4, 1999. The series concluded on September 2, 2000, with a total of 52 episodes.

== Cast and characters ==
Lead cast

- Michael Flores as Daniel Cervantes / Datu
- Angelika Dela Cruz as Reewa Zulueta / Diwata
- Vandolph as Antonio Santo Domingo / Tattoo
- Assunta de Rossi as Maya Feliciano / Mayumi
- Sherwin Ordoñez as Pido Zapata / Kidlat

Supporting cast

- Lindsay Custodio as Caline Mendoza
- Ryan Eigenmann as Katana
- Robert Seña as Guro
- Ace Espinosa as Raja
- Jaime Fabregas as Anak Araw
- Rustom Padilla as Dr. Virus
- Michael V. as Uno Dos Tres
- Samantha Lopez as Thundara
- Manny Castañeda as Madam Odorifica
- Smokey Manaloto as Mad Bomber
- Mel Martinez as Damarama
- KC Montero as KC / Kaptain Crusader
- Michael Lukban as himself
- Kirby Ramos as Matthew
- Monsour Del Rosario as Sung Long
