= Bagwis =

Publication information
- Publisher: Tempo (Manila Bulletin Publishing Corporation)
- Created by: Elwood Perez

In-story information
- Abilities: Superhuman strength, flight, mystical sword and shield

Bagwis is a fictional Filipino comics character created by Elwood Perez as comic series in Tempo, a daily tabloid published by Manila Bulletin Publishing Corporation. The comic ended in 1992. Bagwis is a warrior angel modeled after the Archangel Michael and has superhuman strength. He fights evil with a sword and shield that came from the heavens. His name comes from the Tagalog word "Bagwis" which means "wing".

In 1989, the comic serial was adapted for the film Bagwis with Chuck Perez portraying the title character.

== Other uses ==
An unrelated fictional character also called Bagwis appears in the telefantasya Mulawin broadcast by GMA Network, and also in its spin-off, Encantadia. The character was portrayed by Zoren Legaspi.

Bagwis is a popular name in the Philippines for sighthounds such as the Greyhound or Whippet.
