= Batang-X =

1995 Filipino film

- Comics inspired threatrical release poster
- Directed by: Peque Gallaga; Lore Reyes
- Screenplay by: Peque Gallaga; Lore Reyes
- Story by: Peque Gallaga
- Produced by: Lily Monteverde
- Starring: Aiko Melendez; Michael de Mesa; Janus del Prado; John Prats
- Cinematography: Jose Tutañes
- Edited by: Danny Gloria
- Music by: Archie Castillo
- Production company: Regal Films
- Distributed by: Regal Films
- Release date: April 22, 1995 (Philippines)
- Running time: 94 minutes
- Country: Philippines
- Language: Filipino

Batang-X is a 1995 Filipino film written and directed by Peque Gallaga and Lore Reyes from their screenplay, based on a story written by Gallaga.

Produced and distributed by Regal Films, the film is about 5 children with superhuman abilities who get kidnapped by the alien Dr. Axis to help her steal sources of energy for her spaceship.

== Plot ==
Dr. Kwago introduces himself in an abandoned factory in an unknown location within the Philippines as he narrates the story of the children who saved the world.

Four mutant children were abducted through various means and brought to Dr. Axis' headquarters to be given cybernetic enhancements. Dr. Axis celebrates the success of the operations on the four children and Zygrax went on a mission to find the doctors responsible for the operations on the children, with him successfully finding the information by killing Dr. Drago and stealing the genetic information.

While the four children recovered, another child was in a tank and he was told by Dr. Kwago that he will be the one who will lead the ones who recovered. After talking, his lab trembled. The children are then revealed to have lost their previous memories and they were briefed by Dr. Axis, who lies and introduces herself as their mother.

The children were given different tests to evaluate the powers, often causing trouble to orderlies and doctors alike. Dr. Kwago arrived at Dr. Axis' office and asked her to give the four children to her since he wanted to save the world using them. The two argued and just as Dr. Kwago was forced to leave, the headquarters trembled once more.

Batang-X #5 was brought out of his tank to be operated on by Dr. Kwago, which gave him excruciating pain in the process. Dr. Dinero and his wife were discussing about the results of the children in their own household when they were attacked once more by Zygrax. Zygrax killed the couple and located the address of Dr. Axis' headquarters as well as the children. At the headquarters, G:Boy and A-Gel argued about their own past, which caused Warlalu and Askal to intervene and to be reprimanded by Dr. Axis.

While at Dr. Axis' lab, he introduced Batang-X #5 to his new room and christened him as Control. It is revealed that Zygrax intends to sap all the world's energy by using a crystal to fuel his spaceship. The other children on the other hand, are asked to reach the sanctum by stealing a crystal using their powers, with 3-Na initially objecting to the plan. Warlalu and Askal convinced them that the guards guarding the sanctum are robots. The children were fitted with armor and armed with special guns that also have special abilities.

Dr. Kwago infiltrated the sanctum and the children infiltrated the facility as well. They distracted the guards using their special equipment. The children were able to reach the sanctum but G:Boy and A-Gel argued yet again causing the sanctum to detect their presence. 3-Na saw the horrors she and her fellow Batang-X did to the guards as they succumbed to their injuries. Zydrax also arrived at the facility and there a conflict ensued between him and the children, with Zydrax beating them with ease and leaving them alone. The other guards caught up to the children but they too were distracted. Dr. Kwago entered the sanctum as well to obtain the crystal, and he did it with success.

After Dr. Kwago obtained the crystal, he saw the Batang-X distracted because of the guns they used on each other and brought them out of the facility as well. Zydrax reached the sanctum but was too late as the crystal was already taken. Dr. Kwago brought the Batang-X to his own lab and made them live there. The children realized that they were deceived by Dr. Axis and their past memories started to come back as well. Dr. Kwago disclosed the truth to the children that their past memories were stored in diskettes.

Warlalu and Askal told Dr. Axis that the children escaped from her. It is revealed that Zygrax infiltrated her headquarters and attacked them. G:Boy thought of unplugging Control's power supply because of his perceived cockiness, causing his fellow Batang-X to reprimand him. They realized that 3-Na is missing so they planned to go out of Dr. Kwago's lab to find her. Meanwhile, 3-Na went to Dr. Axis' lab to retrieve her own memories but was caught by Zydrax and she quickly turned invisible. Just as the rest of the Batang-X are about to leave, they noticed Philips being assaulted by thieves, causing the Batang-X to intervene.

Dr. Kwago told the Batang-X that Control also has superpowers in spite of his medical condition. 3-Na returned to Dr. Kwago's lab to show them their memories. The A-Gel and Kidlat were then hooked up to a machine with Control and their memories were then restored. Dr. Kwago asked 3-Na and G:Boy if they wanted to see their memories to which they declined the offer.

A-Gel and Kidlat returned to their family, albeit their own parents were not aware they returned as they were both asleep. They then departed quickly, leaving traces that they returned. G:Boy slowly befriended Control and Dr. Kwago brought the Batang-X to a local McDonald's chain and he explained to them that Control can link their already existing powers, which they did by fist bumping.

The Batang-X went to Dr. Axis' lab, with Control coordinating the efforts of the four. G:Boy went astray from the group to free Dr. Axis from a crystal holding her. He gave Dr. Axis the crystal that would sap all the energy in Earth but he realized that Dr. Axis is an alien. The rest of the Batang-X found the two and tried to convince G:Boy to not join Dr. Axis, with G:Boy finally deciding to side with them. Zygrax suddenly appeared and it was revealed that Zygrax is also an alien like Dr. Axis. Zygrax fought the Batang-X, with the children having a hard time beating him. Dr. Kwago also entered the headquarters and saw the fight. The Batang-X reorganized and was able to defeat Zygrax.

Dr. Axis bade farewell to the Batang-X as well as Dr. Kwago as the headquarters was about to explode. The Batang-X quickly left the exploding building, ending the film.

== Cast ==
- Aiko Melendez as Dr. Axis; she is the main antagonist in the film. She is an alien who kidnapped the children for her own personal gains.
- Michael de Mesa as Dr. Kwago; he is the narrator in the film. He wanted to use the children to save the world and at the same time, acts as the moral guide of the children. His name means owl in Filipino
- John Ace Zabarte as Angel "A-Gel" Arsenal/Batang-X #1 (b. Dec 21, 1986); he is the younger brother of Kidlat/ Batang-X #2. He is crippled but can levitate.
- John Prats as Kiko "Kidlat" Arsenal/Batang-X #2 (b. July 16, 1985); he is the older brother of A-Gel/ Batang-X #1. His powers involve eye beams/laser vision (written in the film as biochemical intensification) and he is blind.
- Anna Larrucea as Trina "3-Na" De La Paz/Batang-X #3 (b. Sep 4, 1983); she is from a rich family but is often ignored by her parents. Her powers involve turning invisible (written in the film as material fluctuation).
- JC Tizon as Bugoy/G:Boy/Batang-X #4 (b. 1984); he is an orphan and a vagrant who causes trouble. His powers involve super strength (written in the film as muscular oscillation).
- Janus del Prado as Control/Batang-X #5; he is the one closest to Dr. Kwago. He can be likened to Professor X. He has muscular atrophy since birth thus he cannot move.
- Alvin Froy Alemania as Freighten Kid
- Chuck Perez as Zygrax, an alien who intends to steal the world's energy to fuel his spaceship. He has regenerative powers.
- Jeofrey Eigenmann as Philips, Dr. Kwago's assistant.
- Al Tantay as Dr. Dinero; one of the doctors responsible in testing the children's powers.
- Amy Perez as Mrs. Dinero; wife of Dr. Dinero.
- Troy Martino as Dr. Drago; he is the doctor responsible for operating on the children, giving them cybernetic enhancements along the way.
- Teresa Loyzaga as Trina's mother
- Jaime Fabregas as Warlalu, one of Dr. Axis' henchmen
- Jon Achaval as Askal, another of Dr. Axis' henchmen
- Orestes Ojeda as Angel & Kiko's father
- Tess Dumpit as Angel & Kiko's mother
- Mel Kimura as Lab Assistant

== Franchise ==
=== Television ===
The movie's success generated a TV series Batang X sa TV on ABC 5, directed by Lore Reyes. The show was developed by MPB Primedia. It ran 45 minutes long per episode.

In 2008, another TV series was commissioned by Unitel Productions, Batang X: The Next Generation, broadcast every Saturday on TV5 (formerly ABC 5). The show's special digital effects were executed by Optima, Inc. and Digitrax, Inc.

=== Comics ===
A comic book series of Batang X was published by Sonic Publishing and was sponsored, as with the movie, by McDonald's.
