= Aguiluz =

Aguiluz is both a given name and surname. Notable people with the name include:

- Aguiluz, a lead character in the Mulawin series played by Richard Gutierrez
- Tikoy Aguiluz (1947–2024), Filipino film director, producer, screenwriter, and cinematographer
- Doctor Amable V R. Aguiluz, founder of AMA Computer College
