= Larry Alcala =

Filipino cartoonist and illustrator

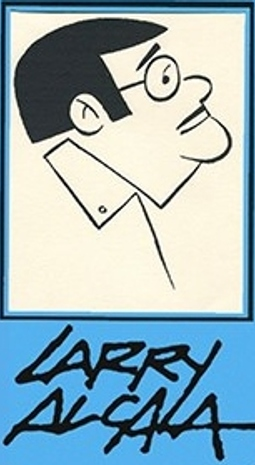
- Larry Alcala
- Born: Lauro Zarate Alcala; August 18, 1926 Daraga, Albay, Philippine Islands
- Died: June 24, 2002 (aged 75) Bacolod, Negros Occidental, Philippines
- Areas: Cartoonist, Publisher
- Pseudonym: Larry Alcala
- Notable works: Siopawman; Slice of Life; Mang Ambo; Kalabog en Bosyo
- Awards: Order of National Artists of the Philippines

Lauro "Larry" Zarate Alcala ONA (August 18, 1926 – June 24, 2002) was a Filipino editorial cartoonist and illustrator. In 2018, he was posthumously conferred the National Artist for Visual Arts title and the Grand Collar of the Order of National Artists (Order ng Pambansang Alagad ng Sining).

== Biography ==
He was born on August 18, 1926, to Ernesto Alcala and Elpidia Zarate in Daraga, Albay. Through a scholarship from Manila Times granted by the publisher Ramón Roces, he obtained a degree of Bachelor of Fine Arts in Painting at the University of the Philippines (UP) in 1950. He became a professor at the same university from 1951 to 1981. He also received the Australian Cultural Award accompanied by a travel study grant in 1975.

He started his cartooning career in 1946 while still attending school. After World War II, he created his very first comic strip, Islaw Palitaw, which was printed on the pages of the Filipino weekly magazine Liwayway. In 1947, he created the comic strip Kalabog en Bosyo, using Taglish as the medium of communication of his characters.

He did came out the very first animation, which was a black-and-white animated short film on 8mm film of a girl doing jumping rope and a boy playing with a yo-yo. He also pioneered animated cartoons for television commercials of products such as Darigold Milk in 1957 and Caltex in 1965. His campaign for the advancement of illustration and commercial art in the Philippines resulted to the establishment of the Visual Communication Department at the UP College of Fine Arts.

In 1997, the Philippine Board on Books for Young People (PBBY) granted him the title Dean of Filipino Cartoonists, an achievement award for his lifetime dedication to the art of capturing humor in the character and everyday life in the Philippines. In 1991, he promoted the formation of a group of young children's book illustrators called Ang Ilustrador ng Kabataan (Ang INK).

All in all, he made over 500 cartoon characters, twenty comic strips, six movies, two murals, and 15,000 published pages in his 56 years of professional cartooning career. He believed in the far-reaching role of cartoons in education and value formation.

== Death ==
Alcala died at the age of 75 on June 24, 2002, due to heart failure at the Riverside Medical Centre, Bacolod City, central Philippines. His remains were laid in repose in state at Rolling Hills Memorial Chapel in Bacolod. In March 2019, his remains were reinterred, and was accorded a state funeral at the Libingan ng mga Bayani.

== Cartoon Works ==
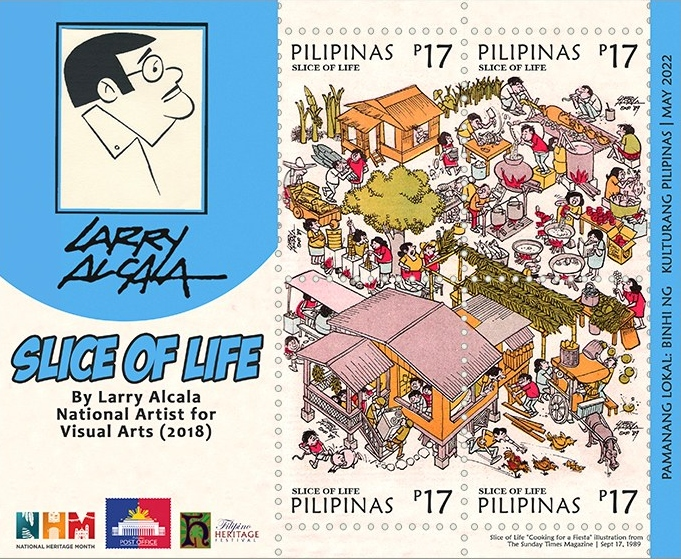
Alcala and a fragment from Slice of Life on a 2022 stamp sheet of the Philippines

His most popular cartoon series was Slice of Life, which is a reflection of the many unique aspects of everyday life in the Philippines. He captured the interest of his weekend patrons by giving them the task of looking for his image cleverly concealed within the weekend cartoon. He did the same with his other comic strip Kalabog en Bosyo. His cartoons had been tapped in advertising campaigns, such as corporate calendars, print ads, promotional T-shirts and in San Miguel Beer cans.

In 1988, his Slice of Life received the Best in Humor award and was also cited for helping to keep alive the Filipino's ability to laugh at himself, through the lively marriage of art and humor, and through commentaries that are at once critical and compassionate, evoking laughter and reflection.

Slice of Life appeared on the pages of the Weekend Magazine.

=== Mang Ambo ===
Mang Ambo is the personification of the Filipino according to Larry Alcala. Mang Ambo, the character, is an incorrigible cock-eyed innocent, possessing a small town charm amidst urban sophistication. Through Mang Ambo and the other characters of a fictional place called Barrio Bulabog, Alcala exposed the follies and foibles of Philippine society in general and of cosmopolitan life in particular. In this cartoon strip's characters, he also affirmed the Filipino's peculiar coping mechanism of laughing at himself in the face of adversity but still absorbing life's vicissitudes with resilience. Mang Ambo made its debut in 1960 as a full-page feature in the Weekly Graphic. The cartoon series later became the first Alcala comic strip to be compiled in book form.

=== Kalabog en Bosyo ===
Alcala's most enduring comic strip was Kalabog en Bosyo that first appeared on the pages of Pilipino Komiks in 1947. It eventually became the longest running cartoon series created by a Filipino.

Decades before Slice of Life, Alcala was already doing cameo roles in his Kalabog en Bosyo comic strips, but instead of portraying himself with a moustach, spectacles and side burns, he rendered himself in a crew-cut, younger and about 100-pounds thinner profile.

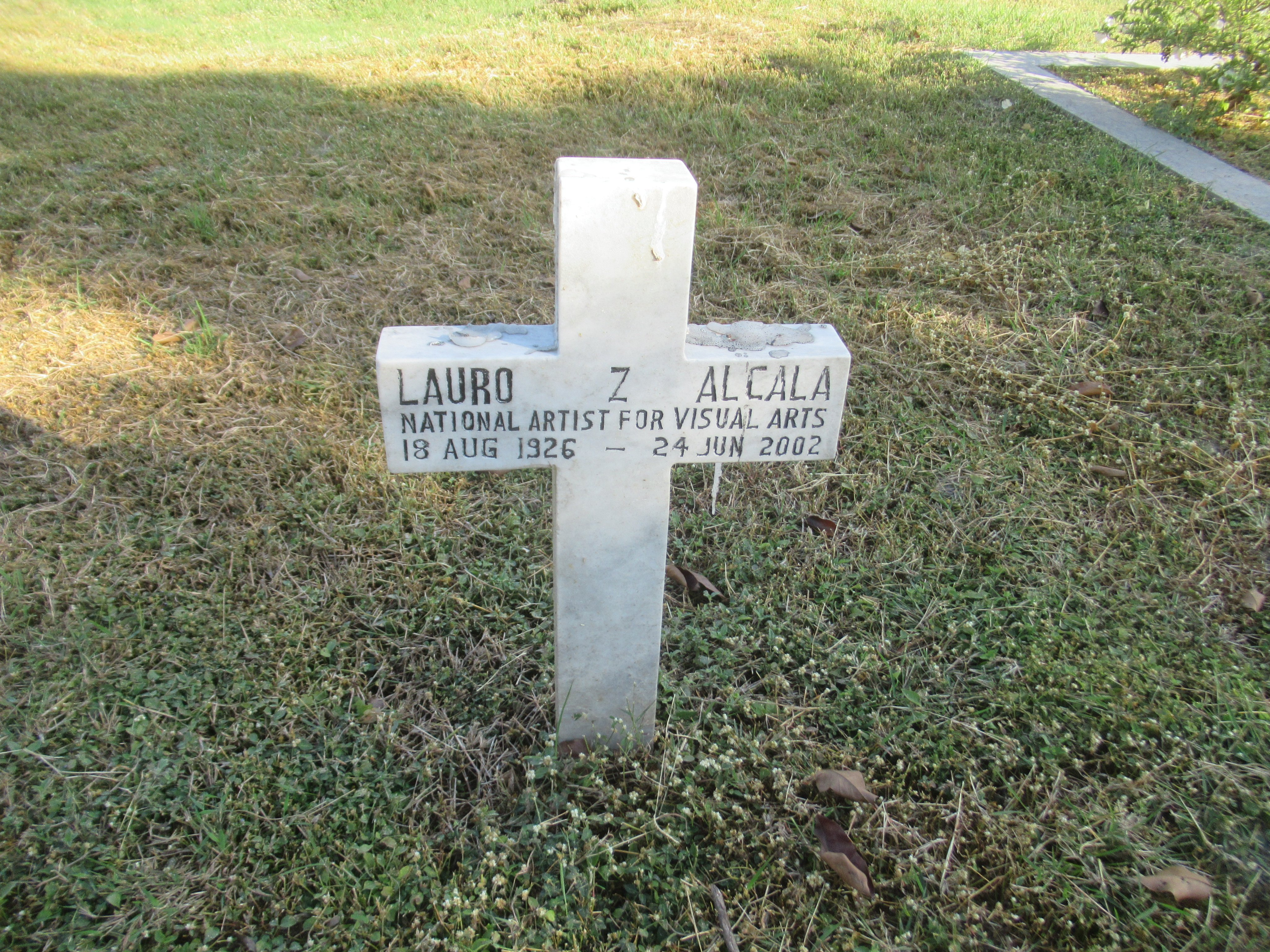
Alcala's grave at the Libingan ng mga Bayani.

An onomatopoeic Tagalog word, the name of the character, Kalabog, refers to the thud sound produced after the impact of a falling object finally reaching solid ground. In Kalabog en Bosyo, Alcala pioneered in the blending of Tagalog and English or Taglish as the medium of communication among his characters. The comic misadventures of the two bungling detectives namely Kalabog and Bosyo had been transposed into films by Sampaguita Pictures in 1957, starring the Filipino actors-comedians, Dolphy and Panchito Alba.

== published works ==
The following is a summary of Alcala's published works:

- International Cartoons, Athens, Greece (1980)
- Salon of Cartoons, Montreal, Canada (1980)
- Laugh and Live, Life Today (1981–2002)
- Slice of Life, Weekend (1980–1986), Sunday Tribune (1986–1987), Sunday Times (1987–1995), Philstar (1995–2002)
- Bing Bam Bung, Pilipino Funny Komiks (1978–1989)
- Asiong Aksaya, Daily Express, Tagalog Klasiks (1976–1984)
- Mod-Caps, Mod Magazine (1974–2002)
- Snickerteens, TSS Magazine (1973–1984)
- Smolbateribols, Darna Komiks (1972–1984)
- Siopawman, Daily Express (1972–1983, 2002)
- Kalambogesyons, Pinoy Komiks (1966–1972)
- Congressman Kalog, Aliwan Komiks (1966–1972)
- Barrio Pogspak, Holiday Komiks (1966–1972)
- Project 13, Pioneer Komiks (1966–1972)
- Loverboy, Redondo Komiks (1964–1969)
- Cartoon Feature, Asia Magazine (1963)
- Mang Ambo, Weekly Graphic (1963–1965), Weekly Nation (1965–1972) Manila Standard (1993–1998)
- This Business of Living, Weekly Graphic (1951–1965), Weekly Nation (1965–1972)
- Best Cartoons from Abroad, New York, US (1955–1956)
- Tipin, Hiwaga Komiks (1951–1965)
- Kalabog en Bosyo, Pilipino Komiks (1949–1983), Manila Times (1984–1995)
- Islaw Palitaw (1946–1948)
- A Cover for Asiaweek Magazine, February 10, 1984
- Mga Salawikain ni Lolo Brigido, Pambata Magazine
- A Cartoon Mural for the Philippine Village Hotel
- A Mural for the Philippine Commission on Audit
- Contributions for Duty Free
- Contributions for Jollibee restaurant
- Caricatures and Cartoons, Private collections
- Cover designs, brochures and catalogs, University of the Philippines
- San Miguel Corporation Calendar, 1983
- SPIC Cartoonists Exhibit on Wheels, 1967 Society of Philippine Illustrators and Cartoonists (SPIC)
- Asiong Aksaya TV show, Energy Conservation Movement of the Philippines, 1977

== Philippine education Contributions ==
The following are Alcala's contributions to education in the Philippines:

- Introduced the first college degree course on Commercial Design in the Philippines, 1953
- Introduced the first 8 mm film production of animated cartoons in Visual Communications course, 1972

== Held positions at University of the Philippines ==
- Instructor, College of Fine Arts, 1951–1962
- Assistant Professor, College of Fine Arts, 1962–1970
- Associate Professor, College of Fine Arts, 1971–1976
- Professor, College of Fine Arts, 1976–1979
- Chairman, Department of Visual Communications, 1978–1981

== Cartoon exhibitions ==
The following are exhibitions of Alcala's cartoons:

- 1999 Larry Alcala & Friends: Cartoons and Caricatures Show, The Westin Philippine Plaza (now Sofitel Philippine Plaza), CCP Complex, Roxas Boulevard,
- 1998 Larry Alcala, Life and Times of a Cartoonist, Museo Pambata Foundation, Inc.
- 1998 Cartoon Festival, Seoul, Korea
- 1995 Asian Cartoonist Exhibition and Symposium, Japan
- 1995 Slices of Larry's Art, SM Megamall Art Center & Liongoren Art Gallery
- 1993 Cartoons, Solo exhibit, San Jose & San Francisco, California, U.S.A.
- 1991 Cartoons, Group exhibit, Japan
- 1990 ASEAN Cartoonist Exhibit, Tokyo, Japan
- 1989 Cartoon Exhibit, China
- 1988 Slices of Life Part 2, Art Association of Bacolod Gallery
- 1987 Slices of Life Here and Abroad, Hyatt Regency Manila
- 1987 Cartoons, Group exhibit, Hiroshima, Japan
- 1986 Cartoons, Solo exhibit, Bratislava, Czechoslovakia
- 1985 Cartoons, Group exhibit, Chicago, San Francisco & Los Angeles, U.S.A.
- 1984 1st Asian Cartoonist Conference, Hiroshima, Japan
- 1984 Larry Alcala's First One-Man Exhibition, Heritage Art Center
- 1982 SKP Exhibit in Australia

== Professional and journalistic achievements ==
The following is an enumeration of Alcala's professional and journalistic accomplishments:

- Art Director, Weekly Nation, 1965–1972
- Editorial Cartoonist and Illustrator, Weekly Graphic, 1961–1964
- TV Art Consultant, Citizens Award for Television (CCMM) 1971–1972
- TV Animated Cartoon Commercial for Darigold Milk, 1969
- Art Consultant, U.P. Public Affairs TV, Channel 13, 1963–1964
- Design artist, Mobil Philippines, 1961–1962
- Supervising Animator, Universal Animated Productions, 1959–1960
- Movie Consultant, Kalabog and Bosyo, 1986
- Movie Consultant, Asiong Aksaya, GP Productions, 1977
- Movie Consultant, Kalabog and Bosyo, Sampaguita Pictures, 1957
- Movie Consultant, Tipin, Sampaguita Pictures, 1956
- Scriptwriter, Dos por Dos, Channel 2, 1974
- Advertising Artist, Pan Pacific Advertising, 1948–1949

== Clubs and organizations ==
Alcala had been affiliated with the following clubs and organizations:

- Adviser, Samahang Kartunista ng Pilipinas (SKP), 1989–2002
- President, Samahang Kartunista ng Pilipinas (SKP), 1979– 1989
- President, Art Directors Club of the Philippines, 1963–1964
- Vice President, Society of Philippine Illustrators and Cartoonists (SPIC) 1962–1963

== Awards, citations and recognitions ==
He received recognition from the following entities:

- U.P. College of Fine Arts
- The Board of Directors of the U.P. Alumni Association,
- The Office of the Mayor of the City of Manila, Philippines
- The Philippine Board on Books for Young People (PBBY)
- The Archdiocese of Manila Catholic Press Awards
- The Citizens' Council for Mass Media 1970 CAM Awards
- The Komiks Operation Brotherhood, Inc. (Komopeb) (Life Achievement Award)
- Samahan ng mga Manunulat, Artist, at Patnugot at mga Manggagawa sa Komiks
- SPIC-NPC Annual Art Awards
- The Society of Philippine Illustrators and Cartoonists
- The Society of Philippine Illustrators and Cartoonists (3rd SPIC Annual Art Awards)
- The Galleria Bernice L
- The U.P. College of Fine Arts Alumni Foundation, Inc.
- The University of the Philippines Alumni Association
- The Philippine Council of Industrial Editors
- The United Artists and Core Corporation, the Philippine Tuberculosis Society, Inc.
- Operation Smile
- The Bureau of Land Transportation
- The Safety Organization of the Philippines, Inc.
- The Veterans Memorial Medical Center Diabetes Association
- The University of St. La Salle, Bacolod City
- The Positive Artists Group (Pamana award)
- The U.P. College of Fine Arts
- The University of the Philippines (Service Award, 25 years of service)
- Caltex and D.O.S.T
- Philips -Boy Scouts of the Philippines, Parol Festïval 1986
- The National Manpower and Youth Council Office of Vocational Preparation
- The Department of Laboratories Veterans Memorial Medical Center
- NAFC, DECS, DENR, DA
- The Gawad CCP Para sa Telebisyon sa Taong 1988
- St. Patrick Commercial Appreciation Award
- The National Environmental Protection Council Awards
- The City of Bacolod
- Caltex-DECS-DOST Science Art Contest
