= Fantaserye and telefantasya =

Fantaserye or telefantasya is a genre of Philippine television programming which mixes soap opera, telenovela, fantasy, myth, magic and enchantment. The episodes are usually 30 minutes long and have a daily slot in the evening primetime row.

== Usage ==
The term fantaserye is often used to refer to ABS-CBN's fantasy series. The first official fantaserye was Marina, a series about a girl cursed to become a mermaid. Telefantasya often refers to the creations of GMA Network; their first telefantasya was Mulawin, a series about a humanoid bird who fell in love with a girl who was later revealed to be part-bird. But even before, GMA has its first fantasy-based soap via Ikaw Na Sana in 1997 and Pintados in 1999. ABS-CBN also reinvented the name of their fantasy TV series depending on its origin, like Krystala, named superserye (pertaining to superhero) and Panday as sineserye (cinematic origin). However, both are still regarded by many as fantaseryes.

== History ==
The Fantasy genre of television has been around even before the word was conceived. Probably the first Filipino fantasy series could be regarded as Okey Ka Fairy Ko!1 produced by TAPE, Inc. in 1987 and broadcast originally on IBC Channel 13, moved to ABS-CBN until TAPE Inc. transferred its programs to GMA after its contract expired with ABS-CBN.

Okey ka, Fairy Ko! is a story about Taga-Lupa ("Earthling" in English) Vic Sotto who married Engkantada (a fairy) Alice Dixson. They had children who were half-earthlings and half-fairies. The fairy, a princess in her world, had a stern mother, Ina Magenta (Charito Solis) who visited the neighborhood everyday, criticizing their lifestyle on earth (sometimes battling with evil from the dark world).

Fantaserye's origins were more rooted towards situational comedy than soap opera (today's fantaseryes and telefantsayas are lined up in evening prime time along with other soap operas), and Okey ka, Fairy Ko! is proof of that. The series had a run of about seven years and was aired on one day of the week for about 60 minutes per episode. Other notable series with similar nature are Wansapanataym of ABS CBN and Beh Bote Nga of GMA Network on Pinoy Teleserye.

Telefantasyas or Fantaseryes need not only depict magical worlds in space or underwater. They may also depict future settings. Pintados, launched by GMA, could also fall under the same genre. Pintados was about a band of painted warriors (Pintados) with the power to control the elements on a mission to save the world. Nowadays, several titles fall under this genre. However, the most popular fantaseryes or telefantasyas are the ones shown weeknights during primetime television. Once-a-week fantaseryes are also included under the same genre but do not receive as much viewership as the ones shown every weeknight.

Fantaseryes weren't given as much as attention earlier and thus were usually shown on a once-a-week basis with each episode running for one to one hour and a half. In 2003, ABS-CBN introduced a new genre of teleserye which mixes soap opera, fantasy, myth, magic and enchantment on a nightly basis. This genre was called fantaserye, with such shows falling under this genre broadcast on a nightly basis during primetime. The first fantaserye that was shown on primetime TV was officially Darating ang Umaga. However, it was commercially a failure. Fantasy themed TV series have been around for while already in the Philippines prior to the launch of the series Darating ang Umaga although they weren't popular on television. in 2004, ABS-CBN took another risk by showing yet another fantaserye called Marina. Unlike its predecessor, Marina set a benchmark for fantaseryes on television when it garnered consistent high ratings during its entire run. The ratings and audience share of the said fantaserye were even higher than the usual more established primetime teleseryes. Because of this, the television series Marina was officially the one that popularized the genre. Today, fantaseryes are the most viewed TV program in the Philippines. Recent surveys by media research firms AC Nielsen and AGB state that fantaseryes have the highest ratings in the evening primetime block.

Although ABS-CBN started the fantaserye fad, its rival GMA network introduced its own fantasy-based series which they called telefantasya which has a similar meaning and nature as a fantaserye. After Marina, ABS-CBN produced fantasy-based series under a different name but with a similar nature in the hope of saturating the ratings game such as superserye Krystala, sineserye Panday and Super Inggo. On the other hand, rival GMA network started their telefantasya run during primetime with Marinara and Mulawin. (But Marinara is more so called as kwela-novela). Although in 1997, GMA officially have their first soap with fantasy genre entitled Ikaw Na Sana. Because of this, GMA network has decided to focus on producing telefantasya shows while ABS-CBN's productions are a mix of at least one fantaserye and several other soap operas (drama).

== Criticisms ==
=== Values formation ===
A TV-magazine show's episode on November 5, 2005, pointed out that fantaseryes have a negative effect on the young children because they cannot clearly mark the borderline between reality and fantasy.

Also in this line, the themes of the telefantasyas often feature battles between two factions: good and evil. Although the good and evil parts of the battle are clearly marked, people, especially the children emphasize more on the fights rather than the victory of good over evil. The children imitate the fights scenes and thus inculcate them in their lives. Conservatives have always critiqued the showing of violence on television as detrimental to the children's values.

=== Social constructionism ===
The theory of Social constructionism is often used as defense by the critics not just of Fantaseryes, but of the television as a postmodern invention. This theory, by Peter Berger and Thomas Luckmann in the 1960s suggests that reality is constructed by the society in general, and individually, by the people who interpret and perceive reality.

In this case, television forms a reality in the minds of the people, specifically, as an "ideal" world on where to live in. The people perceive it and then in turn form the notion that "this is how life should be." This happens, when, in fact, it should not be, because the television is not the reality but life is the ultimate reality.

== See also ==
- Fantasy television
- List of fantasy television programs
- Philippine drama
- ABS-CBN Fantasy Series
- Fantasy TV series
- animixplay TV series
