= List of Philippine mythological creatures =

A host of mythological creatures occur in the mythologies from the Philippines. Philippine mythological creatures are the legendary beasts, monsters, and supernatural beings found in the folklore of more than 140 ethnic groups in the Philippines. Each ethnic people has their own unique set of belief systems, which includes the belief in various mythological creatures. The list does not include figures such as gods, goddesses, deities, and heroes; for these, see List of Philippine mythological figures.

== General terms ==
Some mythological beings are known not only by their individual names but also by general terms that encompass groups of creatures with similar characteristics. Examples of these terms include:

- Aswang: bracket term for shape-shifting creatures that have a variety of forms, such as the blood-sucking vampire, the self-segmenting viscera sucker, the man-eating weredog, the malevolent or evil-eye witch, and the carrion-eating ghoul.
- Duwende: bracket term for small magical beings of the land.
- Engkanto: bracket term for highly-attractive enchanted human-like environmental beings, usually giving off the scent of flowers and having no philthrum.
- Higante: bracket term for giant humanoid land creatures.
- Lamang lupa: bracket term for environmental spirits, which literally means 'inhabiting the bowels of the earth'. Some are considered minor deities who dwell underground. These spirits are generally harmless unless disturbed or their homes are destroyed. They must be treated with respect. For example, people often say "Tabi-tabi po" when passing by mounds believed to be their dwellings, as a sign of respect. Offerings are also made to them during planting and harvest seasons to ensure they do not interfere with the crops.
- Sirena: bracket term for water creatures with a humanoid upper body and the body of a fish from the waist down, similar to merfolk.

Most creatures originated from Philippine mythology, however, are not under any specific bracket term.

== Creatures of the soil ==
- Anito – Ancestral spirits, evil spirits and souls of the dead
- Abyan – Albino-like spirit beings and spirit companions
- Agta – a different name for kapre
- Alan – deformed, winged spirits with fingers and toes that points backwards
- Amalanhig – failed aswangs who emerge from their graves to kill via neck bite
- Amomongo – a man-sized ape with long nails
- Anggitay – female beings like centaurs, the counterpart of a tikbalang
- Santelmo – Saint Elmo's fire
- Banwaanon – Banwaanon are a type of engkanto, elves and fairies from Cebuano folklore. The word banwaanon means “of the jungle” in Cebuano. are believed to live deep in the woods.
- Bal-Bal – an undead monster that devours on corpses
- Batibat – demons in the form of obese hags
- Berbalang – ghouls
- Bungisngis – one-eyed giant, purported to dwell in Meluz, Orion, Bataan, and Cebu; described as always laughing.
- Bulul – are ancestor spirits and the carvings that house them. These figures are traditionally kept in granaries to secure a good harvest. small rice-protecting spirits
- Busaw – cannibalistic creatures who resemble humans
- Buso – demons or evil spirits in Bagobo folklore. They prey on humans, spreading disease and death. To placate them, people offer shrines and sacrifices.
- Dalaketnon – evil engkanto elf-like beings. Males possess pale skin and extremely dark hair, while females boast bronzed skin and dark brown hair. In traditional narratives, they are often portrayed as malevolent figures, enticing and abducting unsuspecting individuals.
- Diwata: (from Sanskrit devata, "gods"), engkantada (from Spanish encantada, "enchantress, charmed") or engkanto (from Spanish encanto, "spell, incantation, charm") are gods and goddesses below the supreme deity or deities; some are similar to dryads who guard natural creations such as forests, seas, mountains, land and air; fair-skinned, good-looking and, sometimes, blonde-haired. reside in large trees, such as acacia and balete, and tend to be resentful of humanity's intrusion into their realm
- Dogong – a gigantic creature that looks like a mermaid with a human head and body of a sea cow, but much larger. It lives on the coast of Iloilo. It guards a large sacred bivalve (taklobo) with a shining pearl that night mariners mistake for a lighthouse.
- Dwende – goblins, hobgoblins, elves or dwarfs (Spanish: duende "little creatures who provide good fortune or foretell an ominous fate to people. goblin, elf, charm"; from "duen de (casa)", owner of the house); there are two types of Dwende: the white and black. White Dwende represents a good motive and the black is bad motive.
- Gisurab (Isneg) – a fire-possessing giant.
- Inlabbuut (Ifugao) – a monster that can shapeshift into a handsome youth to trick people.
- Intumbangel – two intertwined male and female snakes who cause earthquakes when they move, winds when they breathe, and violent storms when they pant in Bukidnon myths. A similar creature is present in Manobo beliefs, but the Manobo snake is said to "guard" the pillar supporting the world.
- Kalapao and Berberoca (Isneg) – giants who can change size at will and can be slain through mortal means.
- Kaunting (Tboli) – a magical horse who can be as small as a mouse when not ridden and who can be kept in a box. He was owned by Cumucul, the eldest son of the supreme couple deities, Kedaw La Sambad and Bulon La Mogoaw.
- Kapre – muscular tree giants described as being tall (7 to 9 ft), big, black, terrifying, and hairy
- Kasili – a fish-like snake who wraps itself around the world; Eugpamolak Manobo called Manama and Kalayagan the supreme deity of the Bagobo people. He gave life to Kasili during the world's creation.
- Kayumang (Bagobo) – a giant crab that sometimes bites the giant eel, Kasili, causing Kasili to wriggle and produce earthquakes. A similar crab named Kagang performs the same to a different earthquake-producing eel.
- Lakivot – a huge talking civet who can carry a person on his back. It defeated the one-eyed ogassi monsters and the garden-protecting busaw while searching for the "flower of gold". It transformed into a handsome young man upon the shaving of his civet eyebrow.
- Lobo (Ilokano) – a large dog that guards the entrance to the underworld. Its indigenous name was lost due to Spanish colonization.
- Mangalo – malevolent goblins or dwarves that the deaths of young individuals from disease are caused by. According to their lore, these beings consume the bowels of their victims, leading to their demise. This belief reflects the absence of knowledge about the scientific causes of disease, such as the corruption of bodily humors or infections.
- Mambabarang – witches who utilize insects to do their bidding
- Mangkukulam – bruha (from Spanish bruja, "witch") are witches, wizards, bruho (Spanish brujo, "wizard, male witch"), or sorcerers who cast evil spells to humans; also called manggagaway
- Multo – term used to describe the spirit of a dead person or animal that visually appears in the lives of people that are still alive.
- Nuno sa punso – (literally, goblin of the mound) goblins or elves who live within mysterious lumps of soil (ant hills); provide a person who steps on their shelter with good luck or misfortune
- Patakoda – a gigantic stallion that used to appear at the Pulangi River. Its appearance brought misfortune and calamities upon the local people.
- Oryol (Bicolano) – a demigod naga, daughter of the evil god Asuang. She fought the hero Handyong in an epic war, which ended with the two becoming lovers due to mutual respect for each other's capabilities. She aided Handyong in defeating a race of wicked giant crocodiles that plagued ancient Ibalon.
- Pangantucan stallion – a wise white horse who saved the domain of Pangantucan from a massacre by uprooting a bamboo and alerting the tribesmen of the enemy's approach.
- Panigotlo – a loyal deer-like messenger and pet of the Aklanon supreme god Gamhanan. It alerted the people about an incoming disaster or a prosperous future. It was killed by a hunter named Dagasanan.
- Pilandok – a mischievous, cunning, and trickster human-standing chevrotain in Molbog beliefs, who is sometimes helpful. The Maranao Pilandok was a human who was a cunning and mischievous trickster.
- Pugot – a shapeshifting fiend whose true shape is that of a gigantic black headless creature
- Rabot – a ferocious, half-human half-monster that could turn people into rock. He was slain by the Bicolano epic hero Bantong using his bolo.
- Sarangay – a creature like a minotaur with jewels attached to its ears
- Sawa (Tagalog, Ati) – a huge serpent monster. Attempts to swallow the moon.
- Sibbaranguyan – a kind giantess who sheltered, fed, and aided a lost Isnag man. She hid the man from her husband who she thought might eat him. She afterwards directed the man to his home.
- Sigbin – a goat with very large ears, a long whip-like tail that emits a foul stench and two grasshopper-like legs on its neck that enable it to jump far distances. It is also known to crabwalk backward. They wander around at night in search of children to devour but they keep the hearts to make amulets.
- Sulod (Sulodnon) – an earthworm caught by the primordial giant Bayi. The earthworm excreted the earth.
- Tandayag (Batak) – a huge being. Accounts say that the Tandayag is a whale, a giant fish, or a dragon that closes the navel of the world called Burungan. If Burungan is left open and Tandayag is not appeased, the whole universe will be washed away by a furious rush of water, unless a shaman makes a spiritual journey to Burungan to close the navel with the aid of a spirit guide in the form of a sea turtle.
- Mahomanay – elf-like Male creatures with pointy ears that are otherworldly handsome with very fair skin and long black hair. Abducts women they fancy and takes her to their world. The female counterpart of the Mahomanay is the red skinned females called Tamalanhig.
- Makarallig (Manobo) – a giant monster created by the evil god Ogassi (not the ogassi race from Bagobo beliefs). It is virtually invulnerable and its heart is made of stone. Its body became a mass of leeches after being defeated by Batooy.
- Child of Makarallig – the stone child of Makarallig in the form of a human; said to be fastened on a cliff of the Pulangi River. Nurtured by Busaw. If released, the child is said to take on the mantle of his father and destroy all the people.
- Tarabusaw (Maguindanaoan) – a huge centaur-like monster who terrorized and ruled the people of mainland Mindanao. He was killed by epic hero Skander. It lived in Mount Matutum.
- Tikbalang – lurk in the mountains and forests; a tall, bony humanoid creature with the head and hooves of a horse and disproportionately long limbs, to the point that its knees reach above its head when it squats down
- Tamawo – malevolent elf-like entity with striking albino features, including very pale to white skin that glimmers in direct sunlight, light-colored hair, and fangs. Unusual physical attributes may include pointy, leaf-shaped ears, high-bridged noses, fair skin, and a lack of a philtrum. Typically dwelling near the sea or bodies of water, Tamawo are often associated with stories revolving around the abduction of young women.
- Tamalanhig – elf-like Female beings with beautiful long black hair and reddish skin and pointy leaf shaped ears. They are the Female counterpart of the pale Mahomanay.
- Tiyanak – un-baptized newborn baby that tricks and preys on people that are usually lost in the woods.
- Walo (Maranao) – an eight-headed hairy giant with a thousand eyes. It guards a section of heaven holding the jarred souls of all humans.

== Creatures of the water ==
- Bacobaco – a great "sea turtle" who bored into the top of Pinatubo, creating a crater and emitting flames, rocks, mud, ashes, smoke and noise. If Bacobaco comes out of the volcano, horrible things will happen.
- Bakunawa – a dragon-like serpent found in various mythologies; a beautiful sea goddess who turned into a serpent deity after her love was spurned in Bicolano, and Panay myth, while in Bisaya myth, she played and swallowed six of the seven moons, leaving only one. In one myth, Bakunawa swallowed many of the moons in anger because her sister, an old sea turtle, was killed by humans. Another myth states that Bakunawa fell in love with a village girl and swallowed the moon in anger because the village chief burned the girl's house.
- Batak crab (Batak) – a titanic crab. Floods are said to be caused when the crab goes in and out of a hole in the sea.
- Berberoka – monsters that hunt by draining ponds and then spewing them back out, submerging those who go to pick up the fish left behind in the drained pond
- Buwaya – Humanoid creatures with reptilian attributes possess the ability to transform into massive crocodiles
- Gaki (Bontoc) – a gigantic crab that caused earthquakes and a figure in Bontoc mythology and folklore. The god Lumawig designated it as his guardian. It can cause the earth to flood.
- Kataw – merfolk
- Kurita – an amphibious animal who survived on land and sea and lives at Mount Kabalalan. He is a creature who eats humans and exterminates nearby animal life.
- Magindara – vicious creatures capable of luring men not only with their physical beauty but also by the beauty of their voices. They would sing beautifully to captivate men and lure them, only to drown them and eat their flesh
- Mandaya primordial eel – a gigantic eel that the earth sits upon. Earthquakes are triggered when the eel becomes agitated by crabs and small animals.
- Nāga – a type of fresh water mermaids, but instead of having fish tails, they have the lower body of a water snake and the upper body of a human female. In Philippine folklore and mythology, they are often described as having an alluring face, curvaceous body and long flowing hair. Moreover, they are vicious to adults but gentle to children and are considered the protectors of springs, wells and rivers. They bring rain, and thus fertility, but are also thought to bring disasters such as floods and drought
- Nanreben – a sea serpent from Negros. Similar to the Mameleu, it has eyes like blazing torches and horns similar to a water buffalo. It has long tusks and teeth and highly resistant scales.
- Sama Stingray – a gigantic stingray that pulled the first family of the Sama peoples underwater. When the family re-emerged, they were filled with vigor and all the traditional knowledge known to the ethnic Sama-Dilaut/Bajau.
- Sirena – sea creatures with a human upper body and a fish tail lower extremities
- Siyokoy: Sea creatures that are usually illustrated as green-skinned humanoids with scales, webbed limbs, and fins. Sometimes incorrectly depicted as the male counterpart of the Sirena.

== Creatures of the air ==
- Galura – In Higaonon myth a gigantic bird that holds the sky using its talons. Its huge wings cause strong winds that act as a buffer to the mortal world. A different bird with the same name is present in Kapampangan mythology, where it is the winged assistant of the god Aring Sinukuan. It is represented by a giant eagle and considered the bringer of storms.
- Kinara - Winged beings that gentle, loyal, and subservient creatures. They are depicted as having a beautiful face, and the upper body of a slender woman or boy with wings, lower body from waist down is that of a huge bird
- Lambana - small winged creatures could expand their figures and temporary loose their wings to imitate humans.
- Manaul – In some Tagalog accounts, Manaul pecked the bamboo from which the first humans sprang. In other accounts, the bird was Amihan, deity of peace. In Bisaya mythology, a different bird with the same name was the horrible king of the birds who fought the wind deity Tubluck Laui. The epic war ended when Manaul was pummeled with boulders by the Bisaya supreme god, Kaptan. In another Bisaya version, Manaul was the bird who dropped rocks over the deities Kaptan and Maguayan to stop the two from warring. In the mythologies of Panay, a species of birds known as manaul are sacred and killing one is punishable by death.
- First Ilokano owl (Ilokano) – a mother who kept on calling out for her dead son and was later transformed into the first owl.
- Limokan – the bird familiar of the Manuvu god Manama. It took fertile soil from the maligned god Ogassi. In Mandaya beliefs, a different human-speaking bird with the same name laid two eggs that hatched the first man and woman. The first egg was laid at the mouth of river Mayo, where the woman was hatched, while the other was laid near the source of the river.
- Magpukatod – the horse that jumps over mountains.
- Mampak – a giant raptor from Sorsogon which was killed through the cooperation of heroes Bulusan and Casiguran. Mampak's death and Casiguran's proposal to Aguingay, who was to be wed to Bulusan, later caused a dispute between the two sides, leading to war.
- Manananggal – derived from the word, tanggal, which means "to separate" because of their ability to separate from their lower body part
- Manaul – a sacred bird
- Minokawa (Bagobo) – a gigantic dragon-like bird. It has a beak and claws of steel. His eyes are mirrors, and each feather is a sharp sword. It lives in outer space and can devour the sun and the moon, and would try to do the same with the earth.
- Olimaw (Ilokano) – a gigantic winged phantom dragon-serpent; seeks to swallow the moon.
- Omaka-an and Maka-ogis – two dragons who terrorized the people and were slain by epic hero Indara Patra (Indarapatra). Omaka-an established lairs in Gurayen mountain range, Makaturing range, and Mount Matutum, where Omaka-an was finally killed. Maka-ogis was slain at Gurayen. This story was heavily Islamized, although many names mentioned retained indigenous qualities.
- Pah (Maguindanaon) – bird of prey as big as a house. It spreads its wings to cause darkness on the ground. It lived at Mount Bita and in the eastern parts of Lanao.
- Samal Naga (Samal) – a gigantic dragon trapped in the milky way. It will be freed and devour all those not faithful to their respective deities.
- Sarimanok: papanok in its feminine form, is a legendary multi-colored bird or chicken
- Sinogo – one of three winged giant messengers (along with Dalagan and Guidala) of the Bisaya supreme god, Kaptan, and the favorite of the god due to his handsome face. He stole Kaptan's magic shell and was later imprisoned in modern-day Tañon Strait. Due to Kaptan's love for him, Sinogo retained a crocodile avatar, a sacred form in old Bisaya beliefs.
- Tawong Lipod – invisible spirits ranging from lesser wind divinities, female spirits of the wind and clouds to malevolent invisible spirit and evil engkanto that appears as dark shadows that causes harm.
- Tigmamanukan – a bird seen as an omen
- Wakwak – a vampiric bird that snatches people at night

== See also ==
- List of Philippine mythological figures
- Ghosts in Filipino culture
- Philippine mythology
- Aswang
- Engkanto
