= Pedro Penduko =

Filipino comic book fictional character

Publication information
- Publisher: Joshua Calungsod
- First appearance: Liwayway Magazine (1954)
- Created by: Francisco V. Coching

In-story information
- Alter ego: Pedro Penduko
- Notable aliases: Pedro
- Abilities: resourcefulness, quick-wittedness, aided by a magical amulet (known as Mutya in the television series)

Pedro Penduko is a Filipino fictional comic book character created by National Artist for Literature Francisco V. Coching. The character, who is styled as a folk hero, debuted in the magazine Liwayway in 1954.

In his numerous incarnations, Pedro Penduko is an ordinary human being with no superpowers. He is, however, resourceful and quick-witted in battling evil forces. He is aided by a magical amulet (known as Mutya in the television series). He is first introduced in the 1994 and 2000 films as a descendant of a family of legendary heroes but is a coward.

In the television version however, Pedro is the son of a mortal and a lambana (fairy) whose adventure begins as he starts searching for his lost father. He then encounters extraordinary creatures unique in Philippine folklore.

Filipino actor Efren Reyes Sr. was the first to play the role in a film. The second and iconic portrayal of Pedro Penduko was that of Ramon Zamora. The popular version of the character in the 90s was played by Janno Gibbs, who appeared in two Pedro Penduko films. Actor Matt Evans was cast as Penduko for a season of the television series Komiks. Komiks Presents: Da Adventures of Pedro Penduko was supposed to last only for a season but because of good ratings it was extended for two more seasons. The third and last season was retitled Komiks Presents: Si Pedro Penduko at ang mga Engkantao. Evans is credited for giving Penduko a curly-haired image, which had already become a trademark of the character.

== Fictional character biography ==
Pedro has the hunchbacked Terio as a companion, a water buffalo as his trusty steed, a lucky bulletproof vest 'anting-anting' that his grandfather gave him that has writing on it that is purported to be an apotropaic magical amulet, and most notably Pedro has no hygiene skills, as his mother is quick to point out. Despite having poor hygiene, a dirty appearance, and an offensive odor, Pedro still is involved in several romantic triangles. Terio loves Amparo, a rich girl with a sinful family, Amparo loves Pedro, and Pedro loves Marina. Tulisan Tirong enters, kidnaps, and threatens with a gun. Pedro fights a crocodile, and cries tearfully; in the end he has learned to live with his poor hygiene. Pedro encounters mermaids and mythological spiders, and many magical things on his journey, and even visits a wizard. Pedro fights a crocodile. There are some references to communism, but Pedro is easygoing.

=== 2016 version ===
A more modern version of Pedro Penduko was created by Regene Estolatan and Jerome Jagonia and published by Epik Studios on January 1, 2016. The updated version featured a Filipino-American named Peter Harris who was the son of a babaylan. He returned to the Philippines in order to track down his heritage and defeat a kapre named Apo Dautan who had been terrorizing a local town. The graphic novel entitled Pedro Penduko: The Legend Begins was the first Filipino komiks to be featured in New York Comic Con. Epik Studios would go on to produce a feature-length Penduko film in 2023 starring Matteo Guidicelli.

== In other media ==
=== Films ===
The character became more popular when it was adapted into the big screen where he made several excursions:

Film	Actor	Produced by	Directed by	Written by	Date released
Pedro Penduko	Efren Reyes Sr.	Premiere Productions, Inc. People's Picture	Gerardo de Leon	Francisco V. Coching	December 21, 1954
Ang Mahiwagang Daigdig ni Pedro Penduko	Ramon Zamora	Topaz Film Productions	Celso Ad. Castillo	Celso Ad. Castillo	June 17, 1973
Bagsik at Kamandag ni Pedro Penduko	Ramon Zamora	Topaz Film Productions	Loida Virina	Jose "Pepe" Wenceslao	July 17, 1974
Ang Pagbabalik ni Pedro Penduko	Janno Gibbs	Viva Films	Ely Matawaran; J. Erastheo Navoa	J. Erastheo 'Baby' Navoa	December 27, 1994
Pedro Penduko, Episode II: The Return of the Comeback	Janno Gibbs	Viva Films	Dwight Gaston	Erik Matti	May 26, 2000
Penduko	Matteo Guidicelli	Viva Films and Epik Studios	Jason Paul Laxamana	Jason Paul Laxamana	December 25, 2023

James Reid was supposed to play the titular role in "Penduko" but bowed out after a spinal injury.

=== Television ===
TV Series	Year	Actor
Super Inggo	2006	cameo role by Matt Evans
Da Adventures of Pedro Penduko	2006-2007	Matt Evans
Pedro Penduko at ang Mga Engkantao	2007	Matt Evans

Matt Evans and Ramon Zamora both appeared as episode guests in an episode in John and Shirley, in which Matt Evans plays Pedro Penduko and Ramon Zamora as the earlier's grandfather Peter.

== Alliances ==
- Captain Barbell - made a cameo appearance in Ang Pagbabalik ni Pedro Penduko (1994)
- Panday - made a cameo appearance in Ang Pagbabalik ni Pedro Penduko (1994)
- Darna - made a cameo appearance in Ang Pagbabalik ni Pedro Penduko (1994)
- Super Inggo

== Enemies ==
=== Villains in film ===
- Lucifero (1994)
- Minokawa (2000)

=== Mythical creatures encountered by Pedro Penduko on television ===
- Bungisngis (portrayed by Tsokoleit) - Bungisngis is a one-eyed giant. This Philippine folklore giant lives in forest and woods. It is a happy and playful cyclops.
- Kapre (portrayed by Bernard Palanca) - The Kapre is a dark and hairy giant creature known for being mischievous. This giant is usually seen atop large trees smoking a giant tobacco. However, Kapre are actually misunderstood. They are nice and kind creatures and they only attack people if they are harmed.
- Manananggal (portrayed by Angelika dela Cruz) - The manananggal comes with different names in some parts of the Philippines including Iki for the Batangueños and Lupa-lup for the Waray. The manananggal is commonly described as a half-bodied woman with monster looks, entangled hair and has bat's wings on her back. She seduces men during the day by disguising into a very beautiful lady. She turns into a monster at night, flies to her victim and usually eats the heart. The best way to kill a manananggal is to put salt or ashes on the lower half of her body that she leaves somewhere when she is in a monster form. When this happens, she will no longer be able to return to her human form, and when the sun shines on her she will turn to dust; much like a vampire.
- Aswang (portrayed by Boots Anson-Roa & Rayver Cruz) - Aswangs are famous in Capiz, Iloilo, and Antique. They are believed to transform themselves into a wild boar, dog, or other animals. Aswangs prey on sick human beings by devouring their favorite organ, the liver. A person may become an Aswang when he or she is infected by an Aswang. This usually happens by drinking or eating from an Aswang's glass or plate. To know if an animal is an Aswang in disguise, you simply bend over and look at them with your head upside down.
- Mambabarang (portrayed by Glydel Mercado & Bea Alonzo) - Mambabarang are ordinary human beings with black magic who torture and later kill their victims by infesting their bodies with insects. They are different from Mangkukulams—the latter only inflict pain or illness. Mambabarangs use a strand of hair from their intended victim and tie it to the bugs or worms which they will use as a medium. When they prick the bug, the victim immediately experiences the intended effect.
- Sigben - Sigben are invisible creatures. This is probably the reason people say that Sigben looks like a dog with the features of a cat and a goat. They are small and they walk backwards. They victimize little children who are sleeping without someone guarding them. They bite the victim's ankle or foot making them very ill and then die after few hours. After they kill a child, they go back to their caretaker. Anyone who takes care of these creatures are believed to gain much luck and wealth. In this series, the Sigben owner is played by John Estrada.
- Dalaketnons (portrayed by Mico Palanca & Jake Cuenca) - They are the bad engkantos. Dalaketnons are known as tall and handsome people. They dress in a fashionable manner, live in mansions and try to fit in with mortal people. Some believe that the only way to Dalaket is by entering the Dalaket trees. These creatures abduct people and take them to their world. They set a feast for their victims and force them to eat the Black Rice that put them under their spell making them their members.
- Nuno sa Punso - (played by Jason Abalos & Aldred Gatchalian) - Nuno are small but terrible creatures who live on punso (anthills). They are invisible and quiet creatures. If they get bothered by too much noise or careless movements causing them harm, they get mad and punish the people who trespasses against them; especially when their house get destroyed by careless children at play. Their victims get very sick, and the only way to cure it is by the Albularyo. So, every time you pass by a punso, you need to say "Tabi-tabi po"(Excuse Me).
- Tiyanak - Tiyanak are monsters who disguise themselves as innocent and adorable looking babies. But once someone comes into contact with them, they reveal themselves as demonic, and attack their victim. These monsters are believed to be aborted or stillborn fetuses who were not blessed.
- Tiktik - (played by Sid Lucero) - Tiktik are sometimes compared to Aswang because they devour human organs. They jump very high, and can crawl on walls like cats and hang like bats. They prey on pregnant women's fetuses and month-old embryos. They attack during the night; where they hop onto the roof of their victim's home. They then stretch out their very long tongues and use it to rip into the womb of their victim and devour her fetus. This act obviously kills the woman too. Tiktik can be killed by cutting off their tongues, thereby leaving them to die of starvation.
- Pugot - (played by Dominic Ochoa)- Pugot are headless ghosts. They wander in places where they used to live or where they were decapitated. They haunt because they are searching for their head; which needs to be rejoined with their corpse and then blessed so they can finally rest in peace. However, some of them have the intention to avenge themselves or harm people. They are believed to behead their victims.
- Tikbalang - (played by Bobby Andrews) - - Tikbalang is a creature with the features of a man and a horse. Unlike the Centaur in Greek Mythology, Tikbalang is playful and mischievous. It has a powerful kick and can leap very high. It creates illusions that make its victims perceive themselves lost (such as passing by the same location over and over again, as if stuck in a maze). These illusions can lead its victim into accidents that may result in death. It can also cause victims to become sick or mentally ill. To work around their tomfoolery, the victim should invert his or her clothing and wear it. This will make the Tikbalang laugh and distract it. To prevent the Tikbalang from harming anyone, one must grab its golden hair and wrap it in his or her finger. The Tikbalang will then be a slave of that person.
- Santelmo (also known as "St. Elmo's Fire") - Santelmo is a fireball that flies around the forest. It chases its victims and kills them by setting them ablaze with flames.
- Bangungot (portrayed by Wilson Go) - According to popular belief, a person who sleeps while his or her stomach is full is most likely to experience nightmares or Bangungot. Bangungot is an overweight creature that lives in trees and bamboos. It is said to believe that they inhabit houses that were constructed from material from the Bangungot's personal dwelling. They attack people who are asleep by sitting on their chests until they die of suffocation.
- Amalanhig (portrayed by Luz Fernandez) - Hiligaynon believe in certain beings called Amalanhigs. They are Aswangs who failed to transfer their monstrosity; causing them to rise from their graves to kill humans by biting their necks. In order to escape from the Amanlanhigs, a potential victim needs to either run in a zigzag direction (as Amalanhigs can only walk in a straight direction due to the stiffness of their body), climb a tree or high platform to put themselves out of their reach, or run into lakes and rivers since Amanlanhigs are scared of deep bodies of water.
- Agta (portrayed by Gerhard Acao) - Agta is a creature very similar to the Kapre. If the Kapre is naughty, the Agta is romantic. They are hairy giants often found smoking tobacco in the forests. The only distinguishing trait of an Agta from a Kapre is that it showers beautiful village girls in flower petals, abducts them into the forest, and makes them entertain him. To stop the Agta, a person must poke and scald his genitals with a flaming object.
- Alan (portrayed by Frank Garcia) - Alan, according to Tinguians and people from Cordillera Mountain Range, is a flesh eating creature whose feet are reversed, toes pointing backwards, to throw off anyone who would follow his footprints. It lures hungry people towards him by placing dry branches on trees and making them look like fruits. Once his potential prey bites the bait, it abducts them and feeds on their flesh. After killing his victims, the Alan keeps their belongings in a jar.
- Wak-Wak (portrayed by Ryan Eigenman) - This monster is called "Wak-Wak" after the sound it makes when it flaps its wings while flying. The louder the sound is, the further away the creature is. The Wak-Wak slashes and mutilates its victims as it feeds on their hearts.
- Berberoka (portrayed by Andrea del Rosario) - The people from Apayao believe and fear a swamp creature called Berberoka. It lures victims to its pond by sucking water into itself, thus lowering the overall water level of the pond enough for a number of fish to surface. Attracted to the school of fish, the victims of the Berberoka are suddenly blasted with a spray of water in amount to what the Berberoka drained. They fall into the pond and drown; to be immediately swallowed by the Berberoka.
- Bal-Bal (portrayed by Carlo Maceda) - is a monster that steals corpses (whether during a funeral or already in the grave) and feeds on them. It has a strong sense of smell for dead human bodies. And once this monster has located and snatched a corpse, it will leave the trunk of a banana tree in the coffin, while creating an illusion of the stolen body to trick people. Bal-Bal has very sharp claws and teeth which it uses to shred clothing off its meal. And since it eats nothing but corpses, it has a foul breath.
- Kataw (portrayed by Jordan Herrera, Iya Villania, Snooky Serna, and Christian Vasquez) - underwater creatures referred to as male mermaids. Unlike mermaids, they have feet instead of tails, but have gills on their bodies. These marine creatures disguise themselves as fishermen asking for help. But when approached by mortals, the Kataws drown them.
- Siyokoy - A marine creature that has the body of a human and a head of a fish. All of the Siyokoys are male.
- Minokawa (portrayed by the voice of Chin Chin Gutierrez) - a giant bird which belongs to the Dragon family. In ancient times, this creature was believed to be so big that it could swallow (or cover) the sun. This was one of many ancient explanations for a solar eclipse.
- Busaw - is a creature that looks like and lives like humans. They raise farm animals and plant root crops. However, its favorite food is human. Human skeletons litter the ground of its dwelling.
- Sirena - marine creatures whose upper body is human and lower half is a fish tail. A Sirena has a beautiful face and voice it uses to lure fishermen to her so she may drown them. Sirena are essentially the combination of a mermaid and a siren.
- Ikugan - this creature is the Philippine counterpart of King Kong. It is a gigantic primate that has a very long tail which it uses to catch humans.
- Inlablabbuot - a huge ugly monster that has a skin tougher than the carabao's, long and rough hair, sharp teeth, and long claws. This creature disguises itself by imitating a person whom the potential victim is very close to. It leads its victims to the woods where it will change back to its monster form and mutilate them.
- Sarangay - a creature resembling a bull with a huge muscular body and jewels attached to its ears.
- Anggitay (portrayed by Ethel Booba) - a female centaur.
- Al-Alya (See also Ghost) - In modern vernacular it is simply the ghost of a dead person who have wander the earth. They roam the earth due to an unfulfilled duty. The Ilocano version of Ghost.
- Note that Minokawa who is the main villain in the 2000 film is different from the creature Minokawa in the television series.

== See also ==
- List of Filipino superheroes
- List of Philippine mythological creatures
- List of Philippine mythological figures
