= Pedro Penduko at ang Mga Engkantao =

- Genre: Supernatural drama Fantasy; Action; Horror; Comedy
- Created by: ABS-CBN Studios
- Written by: Agnes Gagelonia-Uligan
- Directed by: Dondon Santos; Mister Fonzy
- Starring: Matt Evans; Oyo Sotto; Maja Salvador; Denise Laurel; Arron Villaflor; Makisig Morales
- Ending theme: "Tuloy Pa Rin" by Sponge Cola
- Composers: Idonnah and Rommel Villarico
- Country of origin: Philippines
- Original language: Filipino
- No. of episodes: 26

Production
- Running time: 75 minutes

Original release
- Network: ABS-CBN
- Release: May 5 – October 27, 2007

Related
- Da Adventures of Pedro Penduko

Pedro Penduko at ang Mga Engkantao (lit. 'Pedro Penduko and the Enchanted People') is a Philippine television drama fantasy series broadcast by ABS-CBN. The series is the first installment of Komiks. Directed by Dondon S. Santos and Mister Fonzy, it stars Matt Evans, Oyo Boy Sotto, Maja Salvador, Denise Laurel, Arron Villaflor and Makisig Morales. It aired on the network's Saturday evening line up from May 5 to October 27, 2007, replacing Komiks: Da Adventures of Pedro Penduko and was replaced by 1 vs. 100. In this story, Pedro will not be the only one who will fight the evil Kalagua. He would be with the five chosen "Engkantao".

== Plot ==
High school is finally over for Pedro (Matt Evans), and with it, he is about to leave Tulay Buhangin for college. Pedro and Lola Maria (Gloria Romero) found their way to his Lolo Pedro's boarding house at the University Belt, where Pedro is hoping to lead a normal life as a normal student. Except that, a normal life is not really an option for Pedro.

In the first place, Lolo Pablo (Cris Daluz) is not your average grandfather – he gets visions of spirits. And his latest vision is a frightening one – the demon Kalagua has escaped from her prison and is determined to find the chosen Engkantao - a half-human, half engkanto hybrid - whose power can bring her to Floreshka. Once in Floreshka, he intends to destroy the kingdom and all engkantos protecting the human race - and begin the last apocalypse.

=== Pedro in the City ===
In Pedro's arrival, he experienced culture shock. He was amazed by the things in the city. Then, Lola Maria was captured by an unknown man with an evil spirit within him, Pedro then rescued her using his new powers. This incident happened in Cubao, Quezon City. In the other hand, a different accident happened in Makati City. It was in a hotel, where Kalagua put an evil spirit on a photographer and one of the Engkantaos, Josef, helped stop the evil spirit. Another incident took place in Tondo, Manila, where an evil monster came out of the garbage dump, and attacked the people. Marie, an Engkantao, was there to help. In Monumento, Caloocan, Dianne, also an Engkantao, fought the statues, that were brought alive by Kalagua. Also another incident happened in Luneta Grandstand, Manila, when a group of criminals captured people. The fifth Engkantao, Edward, helped them. Quezon City Memorial Circle, is where the last incident happened. Moy, the last Engkantao, used his powers to kill the snakes, that were attacking the people. These incidents happened in the same time, but different places. Those places, traced together, forms a Star of David shape, the symbol of the chosen Engkantaos. After the attacks, Kalagua, tries to find the chosen Engkantao, through the body of Dr. Eva. Will banding together help the young heroes - or will it make it easier for Kalagua to find them?

== Engkantao ==
Engkantao comes from the Tagalog words Engkanto which means supernatural beings and Tao which means human. Engkantaos were people who are half Engkanto and half human.

Kalagua, the villain of the story, is taking her revenge and the only way to do this is to combine her spirit with engkantaos. And only the six chosen engkantaos can defeat her. The six chosen engkantaos would know if they were the chosen one, if they have a Star of David birthmark on their body.

== Cast and characters ==
=== Main cast ===
- Matt Evans as Pedro Penduko - an Engkantao half Lambana of Floreshka and has the ability to emit colorful energy balls and ESP. This brave yet fun-loving hero wants a normal life, and looks forward to it in college. Little does he know that bigger surprises await for him this time.
- Oyo Boy Sotto as Josef - the half-Dalaketnon Josef. Dalaketnons are known to be rather beautiful elitists, and Josef is of no exception. A bit of a coño, he is blessed with telekinesis as well as corporeal duplication—meaning he could generate tangible, living copies of himself indefinitely, and his hair and eyes turn white whenever his power manifests. His nose bleeds as a negative effect of his power.
- Maja Salvador as Marie – a shy probinsiyana, who is half Sigben and half human. Sigbens have the ability to become invisible, so they all look different from each other. Some look like dogs, cats and even goats! Not only Marie is gifted with the power of invisibility, she has the ability to shrink, and the ability to grow ears and a tail whenever she is angry. However, she can get memory lapses if she uses too much of her power. Furthermore, her invisibility does not hide sounds, making it possible to track her while invisible using this way
- Denise Laurel as Dianne - a half-Wakwak who knows how to kick butt. She has wings so she can fly, as well as crawl on walls coupled with unbelievable agility! As a drawback of using too much power, she loses sight, while her power manifests by making her grow bat-like wings and steel claws. As Wakwaks have a bad reputation, Dianne strives to prove to people that they can be nice as well, although she feels guilty that her ancestors had a bad history with humans.
- Arron Villaflor as Edward - half-kataw and half human who has the ability to manipulate water. Kataws are considered as mermen, and so Edward can grow fins, scales and web-like hands whenever his power manifests. Because he has the power to manipulate water, Edward dehydrates as a drawback of using a lot of his power. He came from a dark past, as his brother got into an accident because of his powers. A such, he blames himself for his brother's death and vows never to use his powers again.
- Makisig Morales as Moy - a half-Santelmo and half human. Santelmos are able to wield fire, and Moy has the ability to generate fire and large fireballs. Feeling different from other kids, he bonds with grown-ups instead, and never fails to lose his sunny disposition. His power also has a drawback, as he gets a high fever because of it. Unlike the other members of his group, Moy is the only person who still doesn't know that he is half-Santelmo. This is because Moy's mother already abandoned him when he was still a baby.

=== Supporting cast ===
- Angelika Dela Cruz as Dr. Eva Tabinas/Kalagua/Salupa - the well-loved guidance counselor at Pedro's university. She seemingly has the perfect life, as everything's going well with her career and family. The students love her dearly, as she can easily relate to them. Her world changes when Kalagua decides to take her body as a host.
- Melissa Ricks as Hiyas - the former lambana princess who chose to live as an ordinary human, in order to be with the love of her life, Pedro Penduko. She does not have powers, and will try to live a normal life in the university, with the half-Sigben Marie as her best friend.
- Jake Cuenca as Napoleon- Dalaketnon ruler Napoleon, who chooses to be human and ends up as Pedro's best friend, in order to look for the love of his life, Semona.
- Gloria Romero as Lola Maria - Pedro Penduko's grandmother. She came with Pedro when he came to the city. She was the one who managed the boarding house business of Lolo Pablo while he's still in the hospital.

=== Extended cast ===
- Agot Isidro as Reyna Bukang Liwayway - Pedro's mother, who together with his father Juan, rules the kingdom of Floreshka. Like Lolo Pedro, she senses the presence of an evil spirit roaming earth, and will check up on her son every once in a while.
- Michelle Madrigal as Semona - Napoleon's ex-girlfriend. She was a mere human, and was prohibited to have a relationship with a Dalaketnon. Helpless, she was unable to fight for their love, and became bitter in the end. She will be Kalagua's bridge in wreaking havoc on earth.
- Kitkat as Maalindog - a lambana who now becomes Hiyas' pet flower. Her current appearance does not daunt her from being loud, and at times ends up as a referee between Mayumi and Hiyas.
- Alwyn Uytingco as Topher - one of the boarders in Lolo Pablo's house.
- Beverly Salviejo as Kelly - Landlady in Marie and Hiyas's boarding house.
- Niña Jose as Marikit - the lambana changed to Mayumi by Bukang Liwayway because Mayumi was spoiling Hiyas.
- Eda Nolan as Mayumi - who works as Hiyas' conscience, companion and source of magic on earth whenever Hiyas is in trouble. Hiyas and Pedro are the only ones who can see her.
- Aaron Agassi as Arthur - Another one of the boarders in Lolo Pablo's house.
- Sharlene San Pedro as Monique - Moy's girl best friend who is quite boyish. It was later revealed that she was also a half-Santelmo and half-human engkantao like her best friend Moy but she can project blue flame.

=== Guest characters by episode ===
Episode 1: "Amalanhig"

- Jamilla Obispo as Kalagua's Spirit - The main villain of the story. Dubbed as the "ultimate evil", she was a Babaylan who was burned to death by ancient tribesemen for her wickedness. She now seeks revenge by combining her spirit with a chosen Enkantao. Because she is only a mere spirit, Kalagua uses Dr. Eva Tabinas' body as a vessel while she works on her plans. Kalagua was actually born dead. However, her father called upon the Devil to bring his baby back to life. Unfortunately, the resurrected Kalagua actually became Salupa. Salupa was an encantada warrior from Floreshka who was fiercely loyal to Floreshka during the war against Dalaketnons. However she wanted Floreshka to destroy Dalaket and refused peace with them. She was sentenced to death for her crimes. However, she made a deal with the Devil which allowed her soul to escape. Salupa replaced Kalagua's real soul. Salupa was brought back to life as a human Babaylan in the form of Kalagua.
- Cris Daluz as Lolo Pablo Penduko - the only person who knows that Kalagua was going to take her revenge, that's why his mission is to search for the six chosen Engkantaos.
- Benjie Felipe - one of the villains, a photographer who attacked Josef.
- John Estrada as Dr. Lazaro - the first victim of Kalagua, he is half-amalanhig and half-human, that's why Kalagua managed to combine with him.
- Joyce So

Episode 2: "Alan"

- Victor Basa as Ben - An engkantao who is half-Alan. He seeks revenge against Dianne, his former boss, after she fired him from his job.
- Frank Garcia as Coach Carlos - Edward's Coach in the swimming team.

Episode 3: "Bal-Bal"

- Simon Ibarra as Arthur's Father
- Gilleth Sandico as Arthur's Mother
- Gino Paul de Guzman as Austria - A secret worker for the Bal-Bals who is working in the hospital as security guard so that he can steal dead bodies.
- Cassandra Ponti as Baleria - half-Bal-Bal, she was one of the leaders who was stealing dead bodies in the hospital and eat them.
- JR Valentin as Balmonte - one of the half-Bal-Bal who eats dead bodies.

Episode 4: "Mambabarang"

- Helga Krapf as Mitzi - An engkantao who is half-mambabarang. She is the one responsible for putting a curse on Hiyas after finding out that Hiyas replaced her as the muse of the MVP basketballteam.
- Rodjun Cruz as Rickey - Mitzi's ex-boyfriend and the captain of the MVP basketball team. Rickey became a victim of the mambabarang after he removed Mitzi as the muse of the basketballteam.

Episode 5: "Manananggal"

- Janus del Prado as Doy - A half-manananggal and half human. He was Marlene's boyfriend. Kalagua made his body a host to defeat the 6 chosen ones.
- Erich Gonzales as Marlene - A waitress in Dianne's Coffee Shop and Doy's girlfriend.
- James Blanco - Josef's co-owner of the club.

Episode 6: "Berberoka"

- Hazel Ann Mendoza as Melinda - An engkantao who is half-berberoka. Because she is half-berberoka, it is in her nature that she must drink large amounts of water. In this case, Melinda's source of water is the city's water supply.
- Eva Darren as Lola Azon - Melinda's grandmother. To keep Melinda from consuming all of the city's water supply, Lola Azon ties her to keep in her bed.

Episode 7: "Aswang"

- Gardo Versoza as Nanding - a half-aswang and half human. He really does not want to kill people but he just need something fed his family, and his only way to do this was to kill.
- Lovely Rivero as Joy - Nanding's wife. She does not know anything about the truth of his husband identity.

Episode 8: "Siyokoy"

- Enchong Dee as Mark - a half-siyokoy that is on the same swimming team as Edward. Since he is only half-siyokoy, he has to see his reflection every time he is in the water. When he gets into the water, his reflection transforms into a siyokoy ready to kill.

Episode 9: "Anggitay"

- Jenny Miller as Belle - a half-Anggitay and half-human schoolmate of Pedro, who also became a host of Kalagua.

Episode 10: "Nuno sa Punso"

- John Prats as Bruno - a half-human and half-nuno sa punso. He was Marie's old schoolmate and her partner in JS Prom. He has a love interest with Marie, but gets shut down when he finds out she does not love him.
- Jojit Lorenzo as Amang Nuno - Bruno's father.

Episode 11: "Pugot"

- Rafael Rosell as Tony/Antonio Acael- a half-Pugot, who's taking his revenge to a boy gang who killed his girlfriend.
- Sergio Garcia as one of the gangs.
- Marvin Raymundo as one of the gangs.

Episode 12: "Sigben"

- Nonie Buencamino as Amo - The original half Sigben, the kids were not actually Sigbens, he was just infecting them.
- Robert Villar as Nognog - one of the kids who became a Sigben.

Episode 13: "Ikugan"

- Ketchup Eusebio as Watashi - a half Ikugan. Marie's classmate who tried to kill his teacher who is maltreating him.
- Ana Capri - the class professor whom Watashi kidnapped and tortured.

Episode 14 - 15: "Santelmo"

- Mickey Ferriols as Monique's mother - she was pregnant by the king of Santelmos that is why Monique has the hottest fire of all half-Santelmos. Her flame is colored blue.

Episode 16: "Tiyanak"

- Bruce Quebral as Policeman/Tiyanak - he has a tiyanak twin brother hiding on his back. He uses his twin brother to kill all the criminals he chases.

Episode 17: "Tiktik"

- Jon Avila as Tiktik - poses as a callboy to prey on gay men. He uses his long protruding tongue to strangle his victims.
- James Blanco as Carlo - Josef's friend. In this episode, it was revealed that he was actually gay. He was lucky that he was able to consistently escape the pursuit of the Tiktik.

Episode 18: "Saranggay"

- Jason Abalos as Jorgie - a half Saranggay. He is one of Topher's friends. He transforms to the Saranggay by using a jewel. One night Tohpher's girlfriend got her purse stolen and she thinks that Jorgie is the guy.
- Jill Yulo as Jane - Topher's girlfriend

Episode 19: "Agta"

- Yul Servo as Agta
- Desiree del Valle as Marie - The girlfriend of the Agta

Episode 20: "Busaw"

- John Arcilla - leader of Busaw
- Irma Adlawan

Episode 21: "Tikbalang"

- John Wayne Sace as Todi - An enkantao who is half Tikbalang
- Christian Vasquez as Nelson

Episode 22: "Kalagua"

- Albert Martinez as Juan Penduko

Episode 23: "Lambana"

- Geoff Eigenmann as Bagong Pantas

Episode 24: "Dalaketnon"

- Gerald Anderson as Juancho - The new leader of Dalaketnon
- Max Collins as Antonina - Cousin of Napoleon. she helped Napoleon to return to Dalaket

Episode 25: "Salupa"

Episode 26: "Huling Sagupaan"

== Production credits ==
Directors: Dondon Santos, Erick Salud
Headwriter: Agnes Gagelonia-Uligan
Episode Writers: Aloy Adlawan, Galo Ador, Keiko Aquino, Agnes Gagilonia-Uligan, Joel Mercado
Production Manager: Julie Ann Benitez
Production Designer: Chris Ecker De Guzman, PDGP
Executive In Charge of Production: Roldeo Endrinal
Executive Producers: Rocky Ubana and Kylie R. Manalo
Musical Score and Sound Design: Idonnah and Rommel Villarico

== See also ==
- Da Adventures of Pedro Penduko
- List of Komiks episodes
