= 39th Gawad Urian Awards =

2016 Philippine film awards ceremony

- Official poster featuring Manuel Conde and Elvira Reyes in Manuel Conde's Genghis Khan (1950).
- Date: June 22, 2016
- Site: Kia Theatre, Araneta Center, Cubao, Quezon City
- Hosted by: Iza Calzado; Butch Francisco; Zoren Legaspi

Highlights
- Best Film: Taklub
- Most awards: Heneral Luna (4)
- Most nominations: Da Dog Show; Honor Thy Father; Taklub (10)

Television coverage
- Network: Cinema One

The 39th Gawad Urian Awards or Ika-39 na Gawad Urian was held on June 22, 2016 at the Kia Theatre. They honored the best Filipino films for the year 2015. It was also aired live at Cinema One channel.

Nominations were announced on May 17. Da Dog Show, Honor Thy Father and Taklub received the most nominations with ten.

Taklub won Best Film, its only win in the night. Heneral Luna won most of the awards with four. The Natatanging Gawad Urian was given to Romy Vitug.

== Winners and nominees ==
Best Film Pinakamahusay na Pelikula	Best Direction Pinakamahusay na Direksyon
Taklub; Anino sa Likod ng Buwan; ARI: My Life with a King; Bambanti; Da Dog Show; Heneral Luna; Honor Thy Father; Imbisibol	Jerrold Tarog – Heneral Luna; Carlo Catu – ARI: My Life with a King; Mario Cornejo – Apocalypse Child; Zig Dulay – Bambanti; Lawrence Fajardo – Imbisibol; Ralston Jover – Da Dog Show; Kidlat Tahimik – Balikbayan #1: Memories of Overdevelopment Redux III; Jun Lana – Anino sa Likod ng Buwan; Erik Matti – Honor Thy Father; Brillante Mendoza – Taklub
Best Actor Pinakamahusay na Pangunahing Aktor	Best Actress Pinakamahusay na Pangunahing Aktres
John Lloyd Cruz – Honor Thy Father; Luis Alandy – Anino sa Likod ng Buwan; John Arcilla – Heneral Luna; John Lloyd Cruz – A Second Chance; Ricky Davao – Dayang Asu; Anthony Falcon – Anino sa Likod ng Buwan; Francisco Guinto – ARI: My Life with a King; Sid Lucero – Apocalypse Child; Junjun Quintana – Water Lemon; Jericho Rosales – Walang Forever; Dennis Trillo – Felix Manalo; Lou Veloso – Da Dog Show	LJ Reyes – Anino sa Likod ng Buwan; Nora Aunor – Taklub; Angeli Bayani – Iisa; Mercedes Cabral – Da Dog Show; Annicka Dolonius – Apocalypse Child; Jennylyn Mercado – Walang Forever; Ces Quesada – Imbisibol; Alessandra de Rossi – Bambanti
Best Supporting Actor Pinakamahusay na Pangalawang Aktor	Best Supporting Actress Pinakamahusay na Pangalawang Aktres
Bernardo Bernardo – Imbisibol; RK Bagatsing – Apocalypse Child; Tirso Cruz III – Honor Thy Father; Julio Diaz – Taklub; JM de Guzman – Imbisibol; Aljon Ibañez – Da Dog Show; Micko Laurente – Bambanti; Lou Veloso – Taklub	Ana Abad Santos – Apocalypse Child; Mylene Dizon – Heneral Luna; Liza Diño – Toto; Rio Locsin – Iisa; Tessie Tomas – Water Lemon; Cecile Yumul – ARI: My Life with a King; Gwen Zamora – Apocalypse Child
Best Screenplay Pinakamahusay na Dulang Pampelikula	Best Cinematography Pinakamahusay na Sinematograpiya
Robby Tantingco – ARI: My Life with a King; Herlyn Gail Alegre & John Paul Bedia – Imbisibol; Honeylyn Joy Alipio – Taklub; Zig Dulay – Bambanti; Henry Francia, E.A Rocha & Jerrold Tarog – Heneral Luna; Ralston Jover – Da Dog Show; Jun Lana – Anino sa Likod ng Buwan; Bor Ocampo – Dayang Asu; Lilit Reyes – Water Lemon; Michiko Yamamoto – Honor Thy Father	Pong Ignacio – Heneral Luna; Ike Avellana – Apocalypse Child; Ber Cruz – Honor Thy Father; Odyssey Flores – Taklub; Ma. Solita Garcia – Bambanti; Rody Lacap – Felix Manalo; Carlo Mendoza – Anino sa Likod ng Buwan; Carlo Mendoza – Da Dog Show
Best Production Design Pinakamahusay na Disenyong Pamproduksyon	Best Editing Pinakamahusay na Editing
Ben Payumo – Water Lemon; Harley Alcasid – Bukod Kang Pinagpala; Joel Bilbao, Edgar Martin Littaua & Danny Red – Felix Manalo; Lawrence Fajardo & Rolando Inocencio – Imbisibol; Deans Habal – Da Dog Show; Ericson Navarro – Honor Thy Father; Aped Santos – Bambanti	Jerrold Tarog – Heneral Luna; Lawrence Ang – Anino sa Likod ng Buwan; Diego Marx Dobles – Taklub; Lawrence Fajardo – Imbisibol; Jay Halili – Honor Thy Father; Carlo Francisco Manatad – ARI: My Life with a King; Kats Serraon – Da Dog Show
Best Music Pinakamahusay na Musika	Best Sound Pinakamahusay na Tunog
Jake Abello – ARI: My Life with a King; Diwa de Leon – Taklub; Alessandra de Rossi – Water Lemon; Erwin Romulo – Honor Thy Father; Jerrold Tarog – Heneral Luna	Mikko Quizon – Heneral Luna; Albert Michael Idioma – Anino sa Likod ng Buwan; Albert Michael Idioma – Felix Manalo; Paulito Homillano, Andrew Milallos, Dennis Payumo & Addiss Tabong – Taklub; Mark Locsin – Da Dog Show; Stephen Lopez & Sheka Ong – Dayang Asu; Gilbert Obispo – ARI: My Life with a King; Mikko Quizon – Honor Thy Father
Best Short Film Pinakamahusay na Maikling Pelikula	Best Documentary Pinakamahusay na Dokyumentaryo
Anj Macalanda – Wawa; Ma. Sharlyn Budy, Efren Orpiada Jr. & Shean Jorget Valenzuela – Tiyang Tunay; Annemikami Pablo – Mater; Ma. Jerowe Papin – Biyahe	Sheron Dayoc – The Crescent Rising; Sari Dalena – Dahling Nick; Perry Dizon – Of Cats, Dogs, Farm Animals and Sashimi; Will Fredo – Translacion: Ang Paglakad sa Altar ng Alanganin; Dik Trofeo – Salamat sa Alaala

== Multiple nominations and awards ==
Nominations	Film
10	Da Dog Show
10	Honor Thy Father
10	Taklub
9	Anino sa Likod ng Buwan
9	Heneral Luna
8	ARI: My Life with a King
8	Imbisibol
7	Apocalypse Child
7	Bambanti
5	Water Lemon
4	Felix Manalo
3	Dayang Asu
2	Iisa
2	Walang Forever

Awards	Film
4	Heneral Luna
2	ARI: My Life with a King
