= Balbal =

Balbal may refer to:

- Kurgan stelae, or balbals, anthropomorphic stone slabs on burial mounds
- Bal-Bal, an undead monster in Philippine mythology
