= Buso (Philippine mythology) =

Name for evil spirits in Bagobo folklore

Buso is a generic term for demons or evil spirits in the folklore of the Bagobo peoples. They typically prey upon flesh and send diseases to kill unsuspecting humans. Shrines and offerings would be made to the buso in an attempt to deter them from attacking. They are sometimes associated with tebang and burkan, the ghosts of evil souls.

== Etymology ==
The exact origins of the term are unclear, especially as the Spanish word dios was used to describe both the buso and the diwata

== Folklore ==
Buso were said to live in Mount Apo, leaving it during volcanic eruptions in the form of sulphureous vapor. A number of invisible animals, such as rodents and reptiles, would live near the volcano as servants of the buso. At the center of Apo is a Chinese man who runs a store. It was believed that Americans were able to safely ascend the volcano without the use of protective charms because they are polite to the buso. They were also said to dwell in other mountain trails, grave sites, and empty houses. The Bagobo wouldn't enter a neighbor's house while they were away, for fear of encountering a buso. They can also hide in certain trees, like the Balete tree.

The Bagobo would never travel alone, because the buso can't kill someone directly or openly. They prefer to send plagues or sickness from afar and feasting on their remains after death. They often use the protective cover of night to hide their misdeeds, however their presence is still felt throughout the day.

== Types of Buso ==
The buso's numbers are described as limitless, with a variety of categories they fall into. The word "buso" may be put before or after the individual name.

Abuy & Riiu were pig-like underground creatures that punishes those that intrude upon their house by taking away their strength and killing them with their sharp teeth.

Balinsugu stirs up enmity at festivities and ceremonies, causing fights and feeding off the blood of those killed.

Blanga had bug-like legs and enormous, branching horns.

Buntud were said to have nine-faces and skin as black as soot.

Karokung was a beautiful, river-dwelling woman with white skin, flowing black hair, and either black or blue feet. She would embrace men, throwing him into a fire before then plunging him into the river. This was used to explain the rapid temperature shift during a fever.

Kilat were gigantic horses or carabao that runs through the sky during storms, creating thunder with their hooves.

Kogang was an animal visualized under several shapes.

Limbago was a four-legged creature with a long neck, similar to a giraffe.

Lisu t'kayo were pure white and were associated with the pith of forest trees.

Mamili was the "king of snakes", a number of which were buso.

Mantianak were the ghosts of women who died during childbirth. They haunt their husbands, who are held responsible for the conditions of their death, hovering outside their husband's homes and making sounds similar to that of a cat. They take the form of a woman with sharp talons for fingers and a hole in her chest. The mantianak was said to hate men and fear women.

Marina was a tree-dwelling snake with long arms.

Naat was a deer with one good horn pointing upwards and one bad horn pointing downwards.

Pungatu was a fat four-legged creature with several humps on its back and the head of a bird.

Riwa-riwa were eight-eyed busos that lived in the sky. They listened to the talk of humans and, if they heard something that offended them, their eyes would grow bigger and they would drop to the ground to inflict sickness.

Sekur or Sakar was a four-legged creature with big ears.

S'iring lure people into the forest in the form of a loved one, messes with their memory and judgement, and causes them to accidentally kill themselves. Echoes were said to be the s'iring's voice, attempting to attract travelers away from their paths.

T'abo appeared as if their bodies were cut off at the waist; having a head, upper chest, and arms but no legs or abdomen.

Tagamaling were sometimes called the "good buso", taking on the appearance of a normal person. They were friendly towards humans for one month, killing them and eating them on every other, especially during the full moon.

Tagareso was an ugly buso causes arguments and disputes, sometimes making men dissatisfied with their wives.

Tagasoro was a ceremonial buso said to cause dizziness.

Tigbanua are cited as the most dangerous of the buso. More shrines and offerings are for tigbanua buso, while more spells and magic formulae are prepared against you. These skinny, cannibalistic creatures are described as one-eyed, sharp teeth and claws, flexible necks, and a hooked chin upturned to catch drops of blood that drip from their mouths. While they tend to hunt in groups, they always prefer to take one victim at a time. They are also said to be dull and credulous, being very easy to trick and escape, and are afraid of dogs. In this way, the stories tend to be both gruesome and humorous.

The Tigbanua most often invoked are the following:

- Tigbanua balagan: of the rattan
- Tigbanua batu: of the rocks, or stones
- Tigbanua buis: of the hut-shrine
- Tigbanua dipag-dini-ka-waig: of this side of the river
- Tigbanua dipag-dutun-ka-waig: of the other side of the river
- Tigbanua kayo: of the timber or forest trees
- Tigbanua tana: of the ground
- Tigbanua waig: of the water

Timbalung was said to be a "bad animal that goes into the belly and makes the Bagobo very sick." It was thought to be dangerous to say the name of the timbalung.

Tulung resembled a jungle fowl.

Ubag was a horse with a hump on its back.

Wak-wak was a vampiric, bird-like creature.

== In pop culture ==
The buso in featured in a tabletop game specifically the Tagamaling in the Dungeons & Dragons setting Kara-Tur, tagamaling appear as the infected victims of the tigbanua, turning into them every midnight until they become a full tigbanua on the 99th day.

Tigbanua buso also appear as enemy monsters in the Kara-Tur setting for 2nd edition Dungeons & Dragons, with the added abilities of paralyzing targets with and infecting them with a disease that would turn them into tagamaling.

== See also ==
- Aswang
- Berbalang
- Berberoka
- Marukos
- Nuno sa punso
- Sirena
- Tiyanak
- Toyol
