= Buso =

Buso may refer to:

- Buso (Philippine mythology), a generic term for demons or evil spirits in the folklore of the Bagobo peoples
- Busójárás, a Hungarian festival
- BüSo, short for Bürgerrechtsbewegung Solidarität, a German political party
- Buso Renkin, Japanese manga series
- Busō Shinki, alternative spelling of Busou Shinki, media mix franchise
- Buso language, alternative name of Kwang language
- Aurelio Buso, Italian painter
- Paolo Buso, Italian Rugby player
- Renato Buso, Italian football coach
- Sergio Buso, Italian football coach
- Uriel Buso, Israeli politician
