= Da Adventures of Pedro Penduko =

- Title card
- Genre: Action; Fantasy drama Romance; Comedy horror
- Created by: Francisco V. Coching
- Directed by: Wenn V. Deramas; Trina N. Dayrit; Erick C. Salud; Dondon S. Santos; Jerome C. Pobocan
- Starring: Matt Evans
- Opening theme: "Bitiw" by Sponge Cola
- Country of origin: Philippines
- Original language: Filipino
- No. of episodes: 33

Production
- Production locations: Balagtas and San Jose Del Monte, Bulacan
- Running time: 75 minutes

Original release
- Network: ABS-CBN
- Release: September 9, 2006 – April 28, 2007

Related
- Pedro Penduko at ang Mga Engkantao

Komiks Presents: Da Adventures of Pedro Penduko (lit. 'The Adventures of Pedro Penduko') is a Philippine television drama fantasy series broadcast by ABS-CBN. The series is the first installment of Komiks. Directed by Wenn V. Deramas, Trina N. Dayrit, Erick C. Salud, Dondon S. Santos, Jerome C. Pobocan, it stars Matt Evans in this role. It aired on the network's Saturday evening line up from September 9, 2006 to April 28, 2007, and was replaced by Pedro Penduko at ang Mga Engkantao.

Unlike the stories in the first two seasons of Komiks, which were mostly presented in a single episode or at most in two episodes, Da Adventures of Pedro Penduko will span the entire third (and fourth) season of the series.

This series is currently available on Jeepney TV's Youtube Channel

== The Komiks TV series version ==
In Komiks: Da Adventures of Pedro Penduko, the ABS-CBN network re-introduces the stories of Pedro, with Matt Evans of Pinoy Big Brother: Teen Edition fame in the title role. Also in the cast are Albert Martinez, Agot Isidro, Melissa Ricks, Bembol Roco, TJ Trinidad, comedian Kitkat, Deejay Durano, Olyn Membian and Gloria Romero. The small screen story stays true to the original, but is given a new and more sophisticated look.

=== Plot ===
==== The Missing Father ====
Pedro remains a simple boy thrust into the world of superstition and mythical creatures. The oft-taunted klutz of his class embarks on a special voyage accompanied by his special ‘helpers’, and finds his self-confidence increasing as he passes each challenge in his quest to save his father. In order to do this, he has to have the power of the "mutya ng saging" and has now entered Floreshka to save his father. But as Pedro Penduko sets off on his mission, his introduction to the monsters begins when he faces off with Philippine mythology’s scariest creatures. The conflict arises when Hiyas, who is in love and has a secret relationship with the mortal Pedro, finds out that her father, Haring Haddi of Floreshka, has entered into a peace treaty which states that there will only be peace and unity between the Floreshklans and Dalaketnons if Hiyas marries Napoleon. Hiyas refuses to comply as she is very much in love with Pedro. She also hates Napoleon because of his attitude, although the latter promises to change for the better if only Hiyas would fall in love with him.

==== Pedro's Underwater Adventure ====
Pedro's newest adventure begins as Bukang Liwayway gets catapulted underwater by a large wave, at the most opportune moment for Pedro to know that she is his mother. That marks a new journey for our lovable hero, as he is determined to rescue Bukang Liwayway in the underwater world of Kalalawdan. As Pedro and his father Juan search for answers, they encounter some interesting twists along the way. It turns out that their dear friend Kadyo, whom they perceived to be dead, is actually alive, and is living with his family in Kalalawdan. Also, Pedro discovers the person behind all his trials, as wedding bells herald the future of Hiyas and Napoleon back in the Kingdom of Floreshka. When Pedro and Juan arrived at the underwater kingdom of Kalalawdan, they faced the different kind of underwater engkantos, which was led by Haring Bacul, the king of Kalalwdan, and Budlis, a Kataw soldier. Princess Kafra, though she knew that Pedro was an enemy, still fell in love with him. She wanted Pedro to be a Kataw like one of them, but Pedro insisted. Kafra could not do anything but let her heart be broken. She and her family then helped the Penduko family escape from Pantas and King Bacul. When Pedro was leaving, Kafra kissed him, and Hiyas saw it through his father's mirror. This happening made Hiyas agree to get married with Napoleon.

==== Fight For Love ====
Just right when they came back from Kalalawdan, Pantas takes on a revenge on the Penduko family. Pantas stabs Juan, who later died. In return, Pedro made Pantas swallow the last stone of his mutya, that made him explode to death. Pedro, then decided to go to Floreshka to see Hiyas agrees to get married with Napoleon in order to save her life and her soul from the curse of the black mutya. On the other hand, Haddi and Kasimiro plans on taking Hiyas and Napoleon to Tarusay, where they can be alone and learn to love each other. Not knowing by anyone, Kasimiro and Isidra are planning something on the day of Hiyas and Napoleon's wedding. Pedro, however, tries to stop the wedding by going to Tarusay. Haddi, therefore decided to make the wedding earlier and asked both the Floreshkan and Dalaketnon armies to capture Pedro and put him in jail, so the wedding will not be resumed. Maalindog and Marikit heard the conversation of Kasimiro and Isidra, but they got caught. Maalindog turned into a sunflower by Isidra, while Marikit escaped and helped Pedro get out of the jail and tells Haddi about Kasimiro and Isidra's plan on capturing Floreshka. In the beginning of the wedding, Kasimiro decided to leave and let Isidra takes care of the wedding. In the middle of the ceremony, Isidra was about to attack Hiyas, but Haddi got in the way protecting her daughter, leading to his death. The Floreshkans fought back to the Dalaketnons, and turned into a war. A revelation was later revealed when Juan (who died earlier in the story) returns, but not as a human, as a Floreshkan. Pedro was shocked when he saw his father, but Bukang Liwayway explained that she and Haddi went into an agreement that Juan's body will be killed but his soul will be alive and be a Floreshkan. As the war goes on, Isidra is killed by Napoleon using the punyal, Pedro and Hiyas goes back to Tulay-buhangin and there they faced the different creatures that Pedro once fought. Suddenly, Kasimiro appears and attacks Pedro and Hiyas, but Bukang Liwayway, Juan and Napoleon comes in. Also they got attack by Kasimiro. Pedro then stabs Kasimiro using the punyal, that Napoleon used to kill Isidra, and dies. In the end, the Dalaketnons lost, Napoleon went to the Floreshkans, and Bukang Liwayway became the queen of Floreshka. Being the queen, Bukang Liwayway abolished the rule that an encantada/encantado cannot fall in love with a human. In his return, Pedro graduated high school and decides to live as a normal person. Hiyas, on the other hand, asked Bukang Liwayway if she could be a human and live with Pedro in Manila, where he would study college. But at the end Pedro hears an old man calling for him...

== Cast and characters ==
=== Main cast ===
- Matt Evans as Pedro Penduko
- Melissa Ricks as Prinsesa Hiyas

=== Supporting cast ===
- Gloria Romero as Lola Maria
- Albert Martinez as Juan Penduko
- Agot Isidro as Bukang Liwayway
- Olyn Membian as Racquel
- Kitkat as Maalindog
- Jake Cuenca as Napoleon
- Niña Jose as Marikit
- DJ Durano as Haring Haddi
- Bembol Roco as Ninong Kadyo
- TJ Trinidad as Pantas
- Miko Palanca as Kasimiro

=== Guest cast by episode ===
Episode 2: "Bungisngis"

- Tsokoleit as Bungisngis - A mythical creature, who was beaten by Pedro, but it turns out that it was only a made-up story shared by Pedro towards the children of Barrio Tulay-Buhangin
- Benjie Felipe as Mambubukid - The victim of the Bungisngis.
- Charles Christianson as Chito - One of the bullies of Pedro, who always teases Pedro and beats him up.

Episode 3: "Kapre"

- Bernard Palanca as Kapre - Played the role, Kapre, who was accidentally destroying Barrio Talisay.
- Janus del Prado as Berting - eldest of four children who helped Pedro when he was in Barrio Talisay. He was also captured by the Kapre to become the Kapre's playmate.
- Neri Naig as Neneng - Younger sister of Berting, second eldest of the four children.
- Jiro Manio as Toy-toy - He is the second youngest of the four children.
- KC Aboloc as Momay - She is the youngest of four children.

Episode 4: "Manananggal"

- Angelika Dela Cruz as Aurora / Manananggal - A woman who works at La Corazon Inn. At night, she transforms into a Manananggal who preys upon men who makes women suffer.
- Kris Martinez - One of the workers in La Corazon Inn.
- Sergio Garcia - Also one of the workers in La Corazon Inn.

Episode 5: "Aswang"

- Rayver Cruz as Allan / Aswang II - The grandson of the Aswang in San Nicolas. He sacrificed himself and inherited the Aswang essence of his grandmother.
- Boots Anson-Roa as Aswang I - An old woman who needs to pass on the Aswang essence to one of her family members in order to be able to die peacefully.
- Ilonah Jean - One of the daughters of the Aswang and Allan's mother.
- James Blanco - A tricycle driver who helps Pedro when he was still in San Nicolas.

Episode 6: "Mambabarang"

- Michelle Madrigal as Susan Nieva - Pedro's only hope of finding his father since she was the only person who knows how to get to Dalaket. However, she fell ill to a mysterious disease, which was revealed to be caused by the Mambabarang. Unfortunately, She can't remember anything on how she was able to get safely out of Dalaket; she can only remember that Consehal Lino helped her to get out of Dalaket.
- Ricardo Cepeda as Mr. Nieva - The father of Susan Nieva.
- Bea Alonzo - The goddaughter of the Mambabarang; also wanted Susan Nieva to suffer from her sickness.
- Lito Pimentel - The father of Bea Alonzo's character.
- Glydel Mercado as Mambabarang - A woman who uses insects and spells to kill her victims; with the orders of her goddaughter, she targeted Susan Nieva as one of her victims.

Episode 7: "Sigben"

- John Estrada as Consehal Lino / Sigben Owner - The Counselor of San Gabriel. The only person who knows the way in and out of Dalaket. He is also the person who takes good care of the Sigben and in return, the Sigben gives him good fortune.
- Joyce Jimenez - The wife of Consehal Lino.
- Quintin Alianza as Jun-Jun - Consehal Lino's son. He died due to a bite of his own father's Sigben.

Episode 8: "Dalaketnon"

- Mico Palanca as Kasimiro - Ruler of Dalaket. He ordered to kidnap Juan in order to make him one of them.
- Jake Cuenca as Napoleon - Brother of Kasimiro.

Episode 9: "Nuno Sa Punso"

- Aldred Gatchalian as Antonio / Nuno Sa Punso - A Nuno, who fell in love with Maria, when she was young, but got rejected.
- Valeen Montenegro as Young Maria
- Jason Abalos as Nuno Sa Punso - One of the Nuno.

Episode 10: "Tiyanak"

- Juliana Palermo as Betty - She is the one to take care of the Tiyanaks because she think that the Tiyanak is her own son that died.
- Denise Joaquin as Nurse - A nurse in the hospital where Betty works, she had become a victim of the Tiyanak.

Episode 11: "Tiktik"

- Toni Gonzaga as Thelma - Gary's girlfriend and supposed to be one of the victims of Tiktik but was able to survive. She is pregnant with Garry's child.
- Vhong Navarro as Gary - Pedro's cousin and Thelma's boyfriend.
- Sid Lucero as Tiktik - Disguised as beggar in the streets, he lurks to find his next victim which was Thelma.

Episode 12: "Pugot"

- Carlos Agassi as Gilbert - Thelma's older brother and a baseball coach in San Jose.
- Dominic Ochoa as Pugot / Padre Jesus Pio de Asis - The Pugot haunting the town of San Jose due to the illegal things happening in the town.
- Raphael Martinez - One of the baseball players.
- Steven Fermo - Also one of the baseball players.
- Pokwang as Principal Nendita - The principal in the elementary school in San Jose.

Episode 13: "Tikbalang"

- Bobby Andrews as Tikbalang - A very playful half-human half-horse creature, he played with his victims until they become crazy. He was able to steal the head of the Pugot from Pedro but was tricked by Pedro to serve him because Pedro was able to steal one of the Tikbalang's Golden Hair, which would let the Tikbalang succumb to the wishes of his captor.
- Joross Gamboa - Manong one of the victims of the Tikbalang.
- Carlo Aquino - Also one of the victims of the Tikbalang.
- Debraliz Borres as Nanang - Mother of the two Tikbalang victims.
- Arron Villaflor - A mountain hiker, one of the victims of the Tikbalang.
- Janelle Quintana as Elizabeth - Also a mountain hiker, one of the victims of the Tikbalang.

Episode 14: "Santelmo"

- Rafael Rosell - An escaped prisoner who stole Pedro's baul, which he thought was carrying treasure, however, he became one the victims of the Santelmo and was burnt by it.
- AJ Dee - Also an escaped prisoner who helped steal Pedro's baul and also becoming one of the victim of the Santelmo.
- Eda Nolan as Mayumi - A Lambana who was with Marikit.

Episode 15: "Bangungot"

- Wilson Go as Bangungot - A Bangungot who lived inside Pedro's house.
- Fraz Yap - A caroler who was attacked by the Amalanhig.
- Carl John Barrameda - A caroler, who witnessed the attack of the Amalanhig.

Episode 16: "Amalanhig"

- Luz Fernandez as Amalanhig / Lola Sula / Ursula - The Amalanhig who was attacking the barrio of Tulay-Buhangin.
- Tonton Gutierrez as Erning - A policeman who has a connection with the Amalanhig. He is also the father of Chito, the one who was bullying Pedro.
- Rio Locsin as Virgie - Erning's wife.

Episode 17: "Agta"

- Gerhard Acao as Agta - A mythical creature very similar to a Kapre, who courts pretty women in San Luis. The Agta's weakness was burning their private part.
- Makisig Morales as Budong / Super Inggo - The kid superhero gets helps from Pedro to save his mother from the clutches of the Agta.
- Angelu de Leon as Pacita - The mother of Budong, who was captured by the Agta.
- Joseph Bitangcol as Father - A priest in San Luis.
- Cassandra Ponti as Asther - A woman who was taken by the Agta.
- Rico Barrera as Norman - Asther's boyfriend.
- Matutina as Aling Pilisa - The mother of Asther.

Episode 18: "Alan"

- Frank Garcia as Alan - The mythical creature, who eats people in Kulalapnit. It has specialized feet that confuses people who are tracking them.
- Gardo Versoza as Kapitan Carling Ambing - Baranggay captain of Kulalapnit and has eight children.
- Maja Salvador as Merrydith Ambing - Daughter of Carling and a strong woman who went with Pedro to defeat the Alan.
- J.E. Sison as Edwud Ambing - Son of Carling Ambing
- Alwyn Uytingco as William Ambing - Also a son of Carling Ambing.
- Angel Sy - Also one of the daughters of Carling Ambing.
- John Manalo - One of the victims of Alan and son of Carling Ambing
- Igiboy Flores - Also one of the victims of Alan and also son of Carling Ambing.

Episode 19: "Wak-Wak"

- Ryan Eigenmann as Wak-Wak - A mythical creature similar to an Aswang with specialized wings, who eats people's hearts. When the sound made by a Wakwak is loud, it is still far away from you, but once the sound becomes faints, the Wakwak is near.
- Nikki Gil as Joseline - She is in love with Elias.
- Geoff Eigenman as Elias - A special person and in love with Joseline.
- Carmi Martin as Aling Violy - The mother of Joseline.
- John Arcilla as Mang Tony - The father of Joseline.
- Ronnie Lazaro as Lolo - The grandfather of Elias.

Episode 20: "Berberoka"

- Andrea Del Rosario as Berberoka - A swamp creature, who drowns people and preys upon them.
- Jhong Hilario as Ka Edgar - Rebel brother of Mang Tony
- Ramon Zamora as Father Ben - Friend of Mang Kadyo
- Baron Geisler as Ka Roy - A rebel who brought Mang Kadyo to the Aida's pharmacy.

Episode 21: "Bal-Bal"

- Carlo Maceda as Bal-Bal - A zombie-like creature, who preys upon the bodies of dead people. He also has the special ability of creating an illusion by switching the dead bodies that they would still with the trunks of banana trees.
- Jodi Sta. Maria as Aida - A pharmacist who helped Pedro's Ninong Kadyo.
- Carla Humphries as Cynthia - Ka Roy's sister.
- Juan Rodrigo as Mang Kiko - The father of Ka Roy and Cynthia.

Episode 22: "Kataw"

- Snooky Serna as Casili - A kataw who fell in love with Kadyo.
- Iya Villania as Prinsesa Kafra - A daughter of Casili and Kadyo, she will also fall in love with Pedro.
- Jordan Herrera as Budlis - A kataw, and a suitor of Prinsesa Kafra.
- Karel Marquez as Ruwanna - A mermaid fortune teller and a good friend of Prinsesa Kafra.

Episode 23: "Siyokoy"

- Christian Vasquez as Haring Bagul - King of Kalalawdan
- Tuesday Vargas as Sahasa - The main healer of Kalalawdan, she is owned by the king, but she still keeps on helping other Kalalawdans. She will help Kadyo to be a Kataw.

Episode 24: "Minokawa"

- Chin-Chin Gutierrez as the voice of Minokawa - A giant prehistorical bird who helps Pedro and Juan to send them to the island in the kingdom of Kalalawdan.
- Alex Crisano as Kapre 1 - A kapre who is searching for food. And he found the Minokawa's egg, but Pedro talked to him that the egg is important for the Minokawa.
- Will Devaughn as Kapre 2 - Also one of the Kapres.

Episode 29: "Ikugan"

- Luis Alandy as Nestor - A victim of Ikugan, who was saved by Pedro.

Episode 30: "Inlablabbuot"

- Paw Diaz as Cecile - Wife of Nestor, and a victim of Inlablabbuot.
- Marco Alcaraz as Ruben - Past boyfriend of Cecile.

Episode 31: "Saranggay"

- Mark Anthony Fernandez as Lito - Cousin of Nestor, who needed help on fighting the Saranngay.
- Ana Roces - Wife of Lito.
- Aaron Junatas as Badong - Son of Lito.
- Assunta De Rossi as Isidra - The witch of Dalaket, she and Kasimiro made the plan on taking over Floreshka.

Episode 32: "Anggitay"

- Ethel Booba as Anggitay - The half horse half-woman who later brought Pedro to Tarusay.

=== The Mutya ===
The Mutya is the medallion/talisman that was given to Pedro to provide him special powers which he can use to on his way to search for his father and to find the cure for Pedro's grandmother. It has a total of eight stones; seven of which are representing the seven colors of the rainbow and a white stone as the center of the medallion/talisman. Pedro can only use each stone once so he needs to use them very wisely. The Mutya also excretes out oil which indicates that Pedro was approached or walked near by an enemy in disguise.

- Red Stone - gives the user extraordinary strength. Pedro used this stone to gain an advantage in his battle against the Manananggal. Pedro also used this to overcome the strength of the Tikbalang.
- Orange Stone - gives the user a heightened defensive capabilities to near invulnerability. Pedro used this to defend himself from the heavy blows of the Kapre. Pedro also used this to protect himself from the burning flames of the Santelmo.
- Yellow Stone - gives the user a good singing voice. Pedro used this stone to prove to his dad that he really is his son. Pedro would sing the song of his mother and father when he uses this stone. Once the Mutya's powers were restored for Pedro's new adventure, he used this stone's power in order to trick the Tikbalang in exchanging the head of the Pugot with a fake stone that Pedro possess.
- Green Stone - gives the user extraordinary speed, as well as, partial energy. Pedro was severely weakened by the witchcraft of the Mambabarang, that in order to cope with the loss, Hiyas allowed Pedro to use the stone as a way to gain temporary energy. Pedro also used this stone in order to chase the Tiktik, together with the Blue Stone.
- Blue Stone - gives the user the power to leap or jump higher than one could normally do. Pedro used this in order to even out the odds between him and the Kapre, since the Kapre had a height advantage, therefore cannot be reached by Pedro's attacks. Pedro also used this stone to chase down the Tiktik, who was jumping from roof to roof.
- Indigo Stone - gives the user heightened senses which can help him detect his enemies, especially those that prefer to be unseen under the naked eye. Pedro used this stone in order to detect the Sigben, which could render themselves invisible. Pedro also used this to sense the presence of the Pugot, who was turning invisible and teleports from place to place making it difficult to anticipate where the Pugot would come from.
- Violet Stone - gives the user extraordinary reflexes and agility. Pedro used this stone to compete against the swiftness of the Aswang. Pedro also used this to defeat the elusive Tiyanak.
- White Stone - the central core of the Mutya, gives the user the ultimate power of the Mutya, the power to kill any evil enemy by allowing them to swallow the stone. Pedro used this stone to in order to kill Pantas.

== Production ==
In January 2007, the series was renewed for a second season.

=== Production credits ===
- Directors: Wenn V. Deramas, Trina N. Dayrit, Erick C. Salud, Dondon S. Santos, Jerome Chavez Pobocan
- Headwriter: Agnes Gagelonia-Uligan
- Episode Writers: Aloy Adlawan, Galo Ador, Keiko Aquino, Agnes Gagilonia-Uligan, Joel Mercado
- Production Manager: Julie Ann Benitez
- Production Designer: Chris Ecker De Guzman, PDGP
- Costume Designer: Gia Nogueras
- Executive in Charge of Production: Roldeo T. Endrinal
- Executive Producers: Rocky Ubana and Kylie R. Manalo
- Musical Score and Sound Design: Idonnah Villarico and Rommel Villarico

== Accolades ==
- 2007 PMPC Star Awards for Television's Best Horror-Fantasy Program

== Re-run ==
As part of the Throwback sa Umaga block, the series was re-aired from October 13, 2014, to February 6, 2015, every weekday mornings at 10:00am replacing Precious Hearts Romances Presents: Midnight Phantom and was replaced by Kapamilya Blockbusters. The series was re-aired on Jeepney TV from April 4 to May 18, 2016 and from February 7 to May 31, 2026.

== See also ==
- Pedro Penduko at ang Mga Engkantao
