= Dalaketnon =

Philippine mythical creature

Creature information
- Grouping: Philippine evil engkanto

Origin
- Region: Philippines

Dalaketnon are evil engkanto in Philippine mythology with pointed, leaf-shaped ears. In Visayan culture, they were believed to be handsome and beautiful beings resembling nobles and monarchs of pre-Hispanic Philippines. They exhibit sexual dimorphism, with men having light-colored skin and very dark hair while women have bronze-brown skin and brown hair.

== Etymology ==
The name dalaketnon comes from the fact that these spirits are said to reside in Dalakit trees (also known as Balete or Dakit), with their name meaning "from the Dalakit tree." Their name is not to be confused with dalaguetenon, the Cebuano term for natives from the city of Dalaguete.

== Contemporary depictions ==
In modern portrayals, they are depicted as tall, attractive men and beautiful women with a gothic-inspired appearance. They are described as dressing in stylish clothing, living in large mansion-like houses that resemble haunted homes, and making efforts to blend into human society. Some people believe that the only way to reach their dwelling, Dalaket, is by entering the trunks of Dalaket trees. According to folklore, these creatures abduct people and take them to their own world, where they prepare feasts for their captives. The victims are forced to eat Black Rice, which is believed to place them under the creatures’ enchantment and prevent them from escaping.

In contemporary portrayals, the Dalaketnon are often depicted as strikingly attractive, pale beings adorned in regal attire reminiscent of the principalía or noble class of the Spanish-occupied Philippines. They are known for hosting lavish feasts or dinners, tempting humans to partake in their food. Once a human consumes their food, they become ensnared or enslaved in the otherworldly realm. Dalaketnons were known for their beauty and elitism.

The Dalaketnons maintain regular contact with humans, who are unaware of their true nature as engkanto. According to folklore, the elderly believed that Dalaketnons possessed the ability to transform ordinary humans into beings like themselves, using magical black rice for this purpose. They were also thought to be mortal enemies of the benevolent engkanto. Descended from royal lineage among the evil engkantos, they served as their rulers. They were associated with being masters of various malevolent creatures such as Tiyanak, Aswang, Bal-Bal, Wak Wak, Manananggal, Amalanhig, and even Tiktik.
