= Kontra Bandido =

1986 action-comedy film starring Ramon Zamora, Niño Muhlach

- Directed by: J. Erastheo Navoa
- Written by: J. Erastheo Navoa; Ruben de Guzman
- Starring: Ramon Zamora; Rey Malonzo; Paquito Diaz; Bernardo Bernardo; Janice Jurado; Lito Pastrana; Max Alvarado; Arlene Muhlach; Niño Muhlach
- Cinematography: Bhal Dauz
- Edited by: Armando Jarlego
- Production company: Autorama Films
- Distributed by: Wonder Films
- Release date: December 11, 1986
- Running time: 120 minutes
- Country: Philippines
- Language: Filipino

Kontra Bandido (lit. 'Contra Renegade') is a 1986 Filipino action comedy film co-written and directed by J. Erastheo Navoa and starring Ramon Zamora, Rey Malonzo, Paquito Diaz, Bernardo Bernardo, Janice Jurado, Lito Pastrana, Max Alvarado, Arlene Muhlach, and Niño Muhlach. Produced by Autorama Films, it was released by Wonder Films on December 11, 1986.

Critic Jojo Legaspi of the National Midweek gave the film a positive review for its effective combination of the action and comedy genres.

== Cast ==
- Niño Muhlach
- Ramon Zamora
- Rey Malonzo
- Paquito Diaz
- Bernardo Bernardo
- Janice Jurado
- Lito Pastrana
- Max Alvarado
- Arlene Muhlach
- Sabatini Fernandez
- Franco Mateo
- Jack Jacutin
- Jimmy Reyes
- Ernie David
- Buddy Dator
- George Wendth
- Abel Morado
- Rey Tomenes
- Waldo Reyes
- Rod Francisco
- Joe Estrada
- Bebot David
- Tom Alvarez
- Eddie Villa
- Jeanbel Navoa
- Luis Benedicto

== Release ==
Kontra Bandido was released in theaters on December 11, 1986.

=== Critical response ===
Jojo Legaspi, writing for the National Midweek, gave Kontra Bandido a positive review, commending the film's fairly effective combination of the action and comedy genres which he stated was "because of several effective departures from local convention." Legaspi also wrote that the film did well in providing a good ensemble support to Niño Muhlach, whose popularity was declining due to him slowly outgrowing his child actor status.
