= Kodigo Penal: The Valderrama Case =

- Directed by: Mike Relon Makiling
- Starring: Ramon Zamora; Alma Moreno; Rey Malonzo; Trixia Gomez; Tina Monasterio; Ace Vergel; Philip Gamboa; Katherine Santos; Conrad Poe; Joy Navarro; Celso ad'Castillo; Rolando Gonzalez; Tsing Tong Tsai; Protacio Dee; Angelo Ventura; Val Iglesia; Danny Riel; Eric Francisco
- Production company: GP Films
- Release date: January 11, 1980
- Country: Philippines
- Languages: Filipino; Tagalog

Kodigo Penal: The Valderrama Case is a 1980 Filipino action film directed by Mike Relon Makiling, starring Ace Vergel. The film is based on a true story and real life events.

== Synopsis ==
Capt. Nilo Valderrama, an honest custom officer is burden with pressures when he unravels a major smuggling operation and fights against the contrabandits who threatens the national security.

== Cast ==
- Ace Vergel as Captain Nilo Valderrama
- Ramon Zamora
- Alma Moreno
- Rey Malonzo
- Trixia Gomez
- Tina Monasterio
- Philip Gamboa
- Katherine Santos
- Conrad Poe
- Joy Navarro
- Celso ad'Castillo
- Rolando Gonzalez
- Tsing Tong Tsai
- Protacio Dee
- Angelo Ventura
- Val Iglesia
- Danny Riel
- Eric Francisco
