= Amang Hustler =

1987 action film starring Rhene Imperial

- Directed by: Mike Relon Makiling
- Written by: Mike Relon Makiling
- Starring: Rhene Imperial; Ramon Zamora; Philip Gamboa; Melissa Mendez; Robert Lee; Anita Linda
- Release date: March 6, 1987
- Country: Philippines
- Language: Filipino

Amang Hustler is a 1987 Filipino action crime film written and directed by Mike Relon Makiling and starring Rhene Imperial in the title role of George "Amang" King, alongside Ramon Zamora, Philip Gamboa, Melissa Mendez, Robert Lee, and Anita Linda. Set in Binondo, Manila, the film is about Amang, a Chinese mestizo who is jailed for a crime he did not commit, only to be lead into a life of crime after his release and become the new kingpin of a gambling syndicate. The film was released on March 6, 1987.

Critic Justino Dormiendo of the Manila Standard gave the film a negative review, criticizing the film's exploitative violence and poor characterizations of Chinese Filipinos.

== Synopsis ==
After wrongfully convicted and incarcerated, George "Amang", a Chinese mestizo has become morally corrupt by the flawed justice system. His life has descent into a criminal world of gambling syndicate by becoming the new Kingpin.

== Cast ==
- Rhene Imperial as George "Amang" King
- Ramon Zamora
- Philip Gamboa as Police officer
- Melissa Mendez as Amang's fiancee
- Robert Lee as Syndicate member
- Anita Linda as Amang's mother

== Release ==
Amang Hustler was released in theaters on March 6, 1987.

=== Critical response ===
Justino Dormiendo, writing for the Manila Standard, gave the film a negative review, disparaging the "senselessness and meaninglessness" of the violence in its action scenes. He stated that "Here, [the violence] is used for sheer exploitation, unsparingly, reveling in bloodshed after bloodshed, until the whole movie crumbles in the pool of its gore." Dormiendo also criticized the film's poor characterization of its Chinese Filipino characters with their lack of cultural nuances, as well as the lack of policemen in the story other than Philip Gamboa's character, all of which results in an unconvincing film.
