= Sa Kamay ng Diyos =

2023 Philippine film directed by Zaldy M. Munda

- Theatrical release poster
- Directed by: Zaldy M. Munda
- Written by: Glenda Mendonez
- Produced by: Jonard N. Pamor
- Starring: Aljur Abrenica; Elizabeth Oropesa; Rhene Imperial; Rez Cortez; Ali Forbes; Meg Imperial; William Martinez
- Cinematography: Jun Dalawis
- Edited by: Renato De Leon
- Music by: Rey Magtoto
- Production company: JPM Film Production
- Release date: August 2, 2023
- Running time: 79 minutes
- Country: Philippines
- Language: Filipino

Sa Kamay ng Diyos (transl. In the Hands of God, also known as Sa Kamay ng Diyos: Pastor Jonard N. Pamor Story) is a 2023 Philippine independent biographical film written by Glenda Mendonez and directed by Zaldy M. Munda. It stars Aljur Abrenica, Elizabeth Oropesa, Rhene Imperial, Rez Cortez, Ali Forbes, Meg Imperial and William Martinez. The film is based on the life story of Jonard N. Pamor who also served as producer of the film. Before the release, netizens criticized the film because of its VFX and the poster, eventually becoming a meme in the Philippines.

== Plot ==
A young Jonard Pamor daydreams of one day owning his own airplane. Fueled by this dream, Jonard leaves his family behind and sets out for Davao. For six long years, he drifts through various odd jobs, never finding purpose.

Upon returning home, now more hardened by the city but still hopeful, Jonard lands a job as a security guard at Jeric's Bakery and Grocery. It is here that his life begins to take a strange turn. Assigned to protect a delivery of 80 million pesos, Jonard finds himself in a life-threatening ambush. Armed assailants attempt to hijack the transfer. Gunfire erupts. Bullets fly. In a moment that the film paints as divine intervention, a bullet strikes Jonard’s chest but instead of piercing his body, it ricochets off a mysterious metal object in his pocket. Jonard is spared by what he believes to be the hand of God.

Shaken by the experience, he quits his job and tries to find peace in something simpler he becomes a taxi driver. There’s only one problem he doesn’t know how to drive. His first customer, an unusually calm and patient man, offers to teach him. The stranger guides him on a manual car journey up Mount Apo, symbolizing not only a literal ascent but also a metaphysical awakening. Jonard comes to believe the man was an angel in disguise, sent to prepare him for a higher calling.

Jonard grapples with personal demons. Before finding his path to God, he is portrayed as a man of many vices. He drinks excessively, gambles, and engages in fleeting relationships with several women, one of whom nearly derails his path with a false pregnancy.

His turning point comes when he suffers a stroke, a moment that brings him face-to-face with his mortality. In a near-death vision, he sees a glowing, tattooed pastor speaking the words of healing. When he awakens completely recovered, Jonard takes it as a divine sign. He vows to change his life.

He marries Winderlyn Amit, a woman who supports his transformation, and begins his journey as a preacher. Starting small, Jonard opens a modest food cart business to support his ministry. He's serving food during the day and giving sermons at night, slowly building a loyal following of believers.

Jonard is soon shown performing miraculous feats. He walks across a river without getting wet, telekinetically moves a wooden chair during a sermon, and is seen healing the sick by laying on hands.

As his church grows, so does his influence. But not everyone believes. He faces skepticism from the media, persecution from rivals, and betrayal from former friends who accuse him of being a fraud. Jonard stands in front of a news crew and dares them to strike him down if he is lying about his powers. When lightning cracks above but doesn't hit many believe it’s yet another sign from above.

The film ends with Jonard flying in an airplane, gazing out over the clouds a callback to his childhood dream. The final voiceover says, “You can live a thousand lives, but when God touches you once, it changes everything” and Jonard smiles.

== Cast ==
- Aljur Abrenica as Pastor Jonard N. Pamor
- Elizabeth Oropesa
- Rhene Imperial
- Rez Cortez
- Ali Forbes
- Meg Imperial as Winderlyn Amit
- William Martinez

== Release ==
The film was released on August 2, 2023, by JPM Film Production.

== Reception ==
Philbert Dy of Letterboxd gave the film ½ star and wrote:

My favorite sequence in this has the young Jonard Pamor picking up a newspaper and reading it. It then cross fades into an older Jonard Pamor, now played by Aljur Abrenica, still reading the same newspaper. It's the kind of incompetent storytelling that passes into the realm of the sublime. Up to that point, the movie had merely been bad. From then on, it becomes something else: the kind of garbage cinema that can only be produced by truly insane people.
