= Ramon Zamora =

Filipino actor (1935–2007)

- Born: Ramon Artiaga Zamora; June 27, 1935; San Juan, Rizal, Philippine Islands
- Died: August 26, 2007 (aged 72); Antipolo, Philippines
- Occupations: comedian and action film actor
- Years active: 1971–2007

Ramon Artiaga Zamora (June 27, 1935 – August 26, 2007) was a Filipino film actor best known for his leading roles in local martial arts films and action movies of the 1970s. He was popularly dubbed as the "Bruce Lee of the Philippines".

== Early career ==
Zamora was born in San Juan, Rizal. He began his entertainment career in 1953 as a stuntman and dancer for LVN Pictures. He persevered in the bodabil circuit, performing regularly at the Clover Theater and the Manila Grand Opera House. He also was a member of the Festival Dancers, a dance troupe which performed international tours regularly.

From his stage performances, he was contracted in 1969 to star as a mainstay of the ABS-CBN gag show Super Laff-In. Zamora's most popular stock character in the show was a military-clad figure that bore an unmistakable physical resemblance to Adolf Hitler, who spoke in bastardized German and spouted catchphrases such as "Isprakenheit". The role won him the "Best Actor Citizen's Award for Television".

== Film star ==
When Super Laff-In's network ABS-CBN was closed upon the declaration of martial law in 1972, Zamora shifted gears and focused on a film career. He starred as the durable komiks character Pedro Penduko in the 1973 Celso Ad Castillo fantasy film Ang Mahiwagang Daigdig ni Pedro Penduko. The resulting success of the film boosted Zamora's popularity, and he soon became one of the top box-office draws in Philippine cinema in the 1970s.

Zamora was especially popular for a string of locally produced martial arts films that emerged following the international success of Bruce Lee. Patterning his film persona around a Bruce Lee-type with a comedic twist, Zamora starred in such films as Shadow of the Dragon (1973), Cobra at Lawin (1973), Game of Death (1974), Return of the Dragon (AKA Revenge of the Dragon) (1977), and Bruce Liit (1978).

In 1978, Zamora shared the top billing with actor Weng Weng in Chopsuey Meets Big Time Papa.

Then he played his villain role as Edu Manzano's right-hand man to Lito Lapid in an action packed film Hindi Palulupig (1989).

== Later years ==
By the 1980s, Zamora's career as a leading man petered out, and he returned to guest-starring in television programs, often in his "Hitler" guise. He also portrayed character roles in films, including one in the 1994 update of the Pedro Penduko saga now starring Janno Gibbs, Ang Pagbabalik ni Pedro Penduko. At the time of his death from a heart attack in his Antipolo home, Zamora had completed one last film that had yet to be released, Ataul for Rent. His remains is at Loyola Memorial Park in Marikina.

== Filmography ==
=== Film ===
- The Pig Boss (1972)
- Dobol Trobol (1973)
- Ang Mahiwagang Daigdig ni Pedro Penduko (1973) - Pedro Penduko
- Landas ng Hari (a.k.a. Way of the Dragon, 1973)
- Shadow of the Dragon (1973)
- The Game of Death! (1974)
- Return of the Dragon (1974/I)
- They Call Him Chop-suey (1975) - Chop-suey
- Karunungang Itim (1976)
- Peter Pandesal (1977) - Pete
- The Interceptors (1977)
- Dragon, Lizard, Boxer (1977)
- Ang Hari at ang Alas (1978)
- Bruce Liit (1978)
- Ahas sa Pugad Lawin (1979)
- Kodigo Penal: The Valderrama Case (1980)
- Snake Dragon Connection (1980)
- Ang Tapang para sa Lahat! (1982) - Joaquin
- Dalmacio Armas (1983)
- Porontoy (1983)
- Death Raiders (1984)
- Ninja Komisyon (1986)
- Kontra Bandido (1986)
- Amang Hustler (1987)
- The Rookies and the Mighty Kids (1987)
- Vengeance Squad (1987) - Special participation
- Damong Makamandag (1988)
- Lorenzo Ruiz: The Saint... A Filipino (1988)
- Pepeng Kuryente: Man with a Thousand Volts (1988)
- Me and Ninja Liit (1988) - Papang Sang
- My Darling Domestic (Greyt Eskeyp) (1989)
- Hindi Palulupig (1989) - Ramon
- Dudurugin Kita ng Bala Ko (1991)
- Juan Tamad at Mister Shooli: Mongolian Barbecue (1991) - Gen. Volkswagen
- Eh, Kasi Bata (1992) - Frank Chavit
- Aguinaldo (1993)
- Duterte: Ang Berdugong Alkalde ng Davao (1997) - Ka Diony
- Pedro Penduko, Episode II: The Return of the Comeback (2000) - Maguayen
- Basta Tricycle Driver... Sweet Lover (2000)
- Isang Lahi, Isang Dugo sa Lupang Pangako (2000) - Arula
- Sgt. Isaias Marcos... Bawat Hakbang Panganib (2000)
- Eksperto: Ako ang Sasagupa! (2000) - Mr. Lee Chang Loo
- Eva, Lason kay Adan (2002)
- Pistolero (2002)
- Pelukang Itim: Agimat Ko Ito for Victory Again (2005)
- Lisensyadong Kamao (2005) - Pedring
- M.O.N.A.Y (Misteyks Obda Neyson Adres Yata) ni Mr. Shooli (2007)
- Ataul: For Rent (2007) - Chairman Tando

=== Television ===
Year	Title	Role
1970s	Super Laff-In	himself
2006	Maging Sino Ka Man	Simon
2006	Da Adventures of Pedro Penduko	Father Ben
2006	Maalaala Mo Kaya: "Shades"	Tatay Landro
