= Rhene Imperial =

Filipino actor (born 1950)

Renato Chua (born February 15, 1950), professionally known as Rhene Imperial, a former action star, former producer and currently born-again Christian minister in the Philippines.

In 2023, Imperial returned to the film industry two decades after he retired as an actor, establishing the production company R.A.C. Imperial Multimedia Production and starring in the film Sa Kamay ng Diyos.

== Career ==
Imperial starred in Boy Singkit (1980) with Tony Ferrer and Carmen Ronda, Tong (1980) with Ace Vergel, Deathrow (1981) with Rudy Fernandez and Anthony Alonzo, Quintin Bilibid (1981) with Tetchie Agbayani, Ka Freddie (1984) Gintong Araw ni Boy Madrigal (1984), Miguel Cordero (1985), Sigue-Sigue Brothers (1985) with Bembol Roco and Efren Reyes, Jr. and Ulo ng Gang-Ho (1985) with Dante Varona, Anthony Alonzo and Rey Malonzo.

He became the line producer in Basagan ng Mukha (2001) starring Manny Pacquiao.

After a two-decade break from acting in films, Imperial decided to become a member of the Actors Guild and return to the film industry in 2023, beginning with the films Sa Kamay ng Diyos, Heneral Bantag and Bubot sa Kagubatan, stating that his new advocacy at the guild is to produce films to provide more work for people in the entertainment industry.

== Personal life ==
He was married to actress Carmen Ronda, and they had four children. After years of being together they decided to separate. Veteran actress Carmen Ronda died from ovarian cancer in 2010.

Imperial has two children with Janet Jamora (twin sister of Manny Pacquiao's wife Jinkee).

In March 1988, Task Force Anti-Gambling (TFAG) chief Potenciano Roque accused Imperial along with 37 others of being illegal gambling operators. In 1990, numerous illegal gambling operators in Davao City pointed to Imperial as the head of the largest gambling operation in the area, with the NBI charging him with estafa and illegal gambling. In later years, Imperial came to be open about and expressing regret for his prior activities as a gambling operator.

He is currently working as a born-again Christian minister.

== Filmography ==
- Alas Tres ng Hapon... Lumuhod ang Maton (1977)
- Sa Iyo ang Araw... Sa Akin ang Gabi (1978)
- Mga Paru-parong Ligaw (1978)
- Boy Singkit (1980)
- Maneng Tirador (1980)
- Tong (1980)
- Boy Nazareno (1981)
- Shoot the Killer (1981)
- Death Row (1981)
- Quintin Bilibid (1981)
- K-9 Hunts Takas (1981)
- Ninong (1982)
- Misyon: Dakpin si Bogart (1982)
- Pepeng Hapon (1983)
- Sgt. Maximo Velayo: Trigger ng Mga Kumander (1983)
- 13 Hudas (1983)
- Ka Freddie (1984)
- Gintong Araw ni... Boy Madrigal (1984)
- Tatak Munti (1985)
- Sigue-Sigue Brothers (1985)
- Miguel Cordero (1985)
- Ulo ng Gang-Ho (1985)
- Calapan Jailbreak (1985)
- Boy Tipos (1985)
- Kahit Sa Bala, Hindi Kami Susuko (1986)
- Pepe Saclao: Public Enemy No. 1 (1986)
- Walang Ititirang Buhay (1986)
- Amang Hustler (1987)
- Bala Ko ang Hahatol (1988)
- Mahal Kita... Kahit Sino Ka Pa! (2001)
- Basagan ng Mukha (2001)
- Sa Kamay ng Diyos (2023)
- Heneral Bantag: Anak ng Cordillera (TBA)
- Ang Siga ng Tondo... Daw! (TBA)
- Bubot sa Kagubatan (TBA)
