= Bernardo Bernardo =

Filipino actor, comedian, and film director

Bernardo C. Bernardo
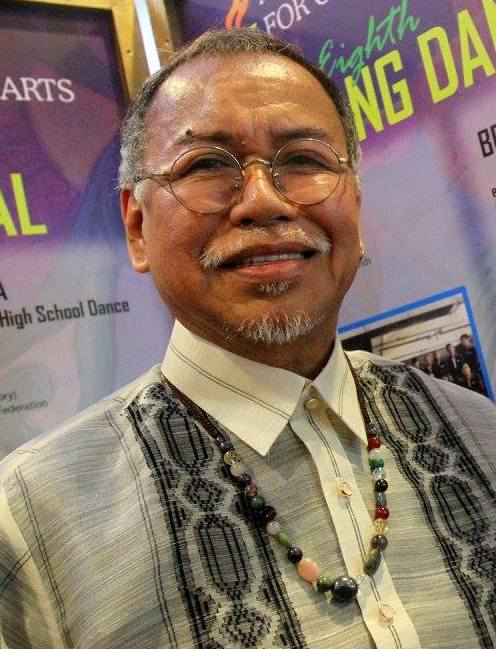
- Bernardo in 2016
- Born: January 28, 1945; Santa Ana, Manila, Philippine Commonwealth
- Died: March 8, 2018 (aged 73); Manila, Philippines
- Occupations: Actor, theatre actor, comedian
- Known for: Imbisibol; Manila by Night
- Height: 1.8 m (5 ft 11 in)
- Relatives: Susan Vecina Santos (niece)
- Awards: Gawad Urian Award for Best Actor (1981), Gaward Urian Award for Best Supporting Actor (2016)

Bernardo C. Bernardo (January 28, 1945 – March 8, 2018) was a Filipino veteran stage actor, comedian, and film director. He was known for his role as a supporting actor for the blockbuster film Invisible, which is also known as Imbisibol in the Philippines. Bernardo was awarded the Gawad Urian Award for his Best Supporting Actor role for the film, Invisible at the 39th Gawad Urian Awards in 2016 and was also nominated for Best Supporting Actor at the 2016 FAP Awards in the Philippines. Bernardo died on March 8, 2018, following a tumor in his pancreas.

== Biography ==
Bernardo C. Bernardo was born on January 28, 1945, in Santa Ana, Manila. He received the Degree of Bachelor of Literature in Journalism from the University of Santo Tomas. Bernardo also received the theatre training at the University of California, Santa Barbara and graduated with a Master of Arts Degree at the London Academy of Music and Dramatic Art under a British council grant. He also was the program director of Theater Arts at Meridian International College, also known as MINT College.

== Career ==
He rose to prominence as a respectable theatre actor and gained fame as a supporting actor in the Philippines when he transitioned to film industry in the mid-1970s. He went onto win the Gaward Urian Award for Best Actor at the 5th Gawad Urian Awards in 1981 for his role as "Manay Sharon in Ishmael Bernal" for the film, Manila By Night which is also commonly known as City After Dark.

He also acted in few Filipino comedy series including the role of the antagonist Steve Carpio in the comedy series, Home Along Da Riles.

== Filmography ==
=== As actor ===
==== Film ====
| Year | Title | Role |
|---|---|---|
| 1974 | Carnival Song | |
| 1975 | Lorelei | Julius |
| 1975 | Kapitan Kulas | Gen. Malvar |
| 1976 | Forever Emmanuelle | Artemio |
| 1976 | Sinta! Ang Bituing Bagong Gising | Matanglawin |
| 1980 | Manila by Night | Manay Sharon |
| 1981 | Pabling | |
| 1983 | Dalmacio Armas | |
| 1985 | Mga Paru-Parong Buking | Gerry |
| 1985 | Abandonado | |
| 1986 | Kontra Bandido | |
| 1986 | Tuklaw | |
| 1990 | Fatal Vacation | Rebel Leader |
| 1993 | Home Along Da Riles: The Movie | Steve Carpio |
| 1993 | Isang Bala Ka Lang Part II | |
| 1995 | Father en Son | Derek Capatas |
| 1995 | Magkasangga 2000 | Ador |
| 1996 | Bitag | |
| 1997 | Home Along Da Riles: The Movie Part 2 | Steve Carpio |
| 1998 | Haba Haba Doo, Puti Puti Poo! | MG. G. Hasa |
| 1998 | Tong Tatlong Tatay Kong Pakitong Kitong | Diday |
| 1999 | Honey My Love So Sweet | Adonis |
| 1999 | Isprikitik: Walastik Kung Pumitik | Assistant Manager |
| 1999 | Tar-San | Professor T-Bak |
| 2001 | Sanggano't Sanggago | Emcee |
| 2005 | Chateau de Roses | Maria |
| 2006 | Ingrata | Hermie |
| 2007 | Pisay | Quizmaster |
| 2008 | Brown Soup Thing | Uncle Bernardo |
| 2014 | Ronda | |
| 2015 | Imbisibol | |
| 2015 | Chain Mail | |
| 2016 | Hele sa Hiwagang Hapis | Lalake/Tikbalang |
| 2016 | Whistleblower | |
| 2016 | Singing in Graveyards | Lilit |
| 2016 | Purgatoryo | Violet/morgue runner |
| 2017 | The Portrait (last movie) | Don Alvaro |
| 2018 | The Significant Other (posthomus movie) | Mr. Artache |

==== Television ====
| Year | Title | Role |
|---|---|---|
| 1991 | Maalaala Mo Kaya | Migo (Some Good Things) |
| 1993–2002 | Home Along Da Riles | Steve Carpio |
| 2001 | Maalaala Mo Kaya | Aling Mameng |
| 2015 | Fil Lab Presents | |

=== As writer ===
| Year | Title |
|---|---|
| 1974 | Happy Days Are Here Again |
| 2006 | Ingrata |

=== As director ===
| Year | Title | Role |
|---|---|---|
| 2011-2015 | Pusong Pinoy sa Amerika | |

=== As production designer ===
| Year | Title |
|---|---|
| 1976 | Sinta! Ang Bituing Bagiong Silang |

== Death ==
Bernardo Bernardo had been undergoing treatment since January 2018 after developing a potentially life-threatening tumor in his pancreas, which was later diagnosed as pancreatic cancer. He died on March 8, 2018. Actors, directors in the Philippines and other countries paid tribute. Several critics pointed out that the death of Bernardo is a loss to the film industry as he had contributed to the film industry immensely during his lifetime.
