= Invisible (2015 film) =

2015 Filipino drama film

- Directed by: Lawrence Fajardo
- Written by: John Paul Bedia; Herlyn Alegre
- Starring: Allen Dizon
- Cinematography: Boy Yniguez
- Release date: 18 March 2015
- Running time: 132 minutes
- Country: Philippines
- Language: Filipino

Invisible (Tagalog: Imbisibol) is a 2015 Filipino drama film directed by Lawrence Fajardo. It was screened in the Contemporary World Cinema section of the 2015 Toronto International Film Festival.

== Synopsis ==
It tells the tale of illegal Filipino immigrants in Japan and their plight to evade authorities.

== Cast ==
- Allen Dizon as Manuel
- Ces Quesada as Linda
- Bernardo Bernardo as Benjie
- JM de Guzman as Rodel
- Ricky Davao as Edward
- JC Santos
- Onyl Torres
- Miles Canapi
- Krisma Fajardo
- Kimmy Maclang
- Cynthia Luster
