= Busaw =

Philippine mythical creature

Creature information
- Grouping: Philippine ogre, Corpse eater
- Similar entities: Aswang, Amalanhig, Bal-Bal

Origin
- Region: Philippines

Busaw is a legendary creature that resembles humans in appearance and behavior, raising farm animals and planting root crops. However, its favorite food is humans, resulting in scattered human skeletons on the grounds of its dwelling place.

The Busaw was a ghoul and corpse thief. An evil spirit who looked and behaved like ordinary human beings by day, it listened for sounds of death in the evenings, and dwelled in large trees near cemeteries. It had pointed teeth, hooked nails and a long tongue. It took banana tree trunks to replace the dead as it stole the corpses out of their coffins. Then, spiriting the corpse off after first turning it into a pig, the Busaw would feast on it and even try to feed it to their human neighbors during the day in order to turn them into ghouls like itself. To ward the Busaw off, all corpses should be washed completely with vinegar and strong-smelling herbs. Salt is also a Busaw deterrent.
