= Aguingay =

Philippine mythological figure

- Member of Eponymous hero of the Bulusan-Sorsoganon-Bicol epic Si Bulusan nan Si Aguingay
- Gender: Female
- Region: Philippines

Aguingay or Agingay is a legendary lady mistress of the warrior of Bulusan in the town's most popular folklore. She is the main character of the epic: Si Bulusan nan Si Aguingay believed to have existed hundreds of years before Spaniards set foot in the islands of the Philippines.

== Early years ==
Aguingay is believed to be the daughter of Bulusan's neighboring tribe head who was born a beautiful girl with fair complexion. She is betrothed to the son of a great warrior and was named Bulusan which later became the town's name.

== Mampak Bird ==
The people of Bulusan believed that the town was attacked by a giant bird called Mampak which killed hundreds of tribesmen during the time of Aguingay. Just before Bulusan and Aguingay get formally married the bird attacked the tribes north of the town. When the bird got nearer the tribe from west of the town headed by Casiguran helped to kill it. They mobbed and killed the bird and threw it to the sea. It is also a common belief among the people of Bulusan that the villages' names originated from the landing of "Mampak" bird to its struggles and death. Notably Tagdon in Barcelona, Sorsogon means landing, then Layog means flight or fly and others. Some beliefs said that Bulusan Lake was its blood when it was finally fatally wounded and landed at the foot of the mountain. San Bernardino island is also believed as a site where it was buried.

== Casiguran ==
Casiguran claimed that their tribesmen killed the bird. He proposed to marry Aguingay as a reward. Bulusan protested and Casiguran asked for a fight. The battle began at noon at Punta Tawog leaving Casiguran and his tribesmen lost in the battle and surrendered. They returned home west and left Aguingay to Bulusan. Bulusan was declared a warrior hero who killed the giant bird.

== Tragedy ==
A village princess Dayang Buhang fell in love with Bulusan and would want to steal Bulusan from Aguingay just before they get married. The couple was alarmed at the news and they escaped to the forests to avoid the princess' wrath. The princess ordered the men to get Bulusan even to the expense of killing Aguingay. When the soldiers found them they fought back and died. The princess was saddened by the news and ordered the men to give them majestic burial, so high enough that the people could see the tombs from the town. And so was the legend of the two mountains begun.

== Reynaldo T. Jamoralin's Version ==
=== Si Bulusan nan Si Aguingay ===
Just recently united in marriage, brave and handsome Bulusan and beautiful Agingay live happily under the shadow of the volcano, but, unknown to the happily married couple; evil lurks in the shadows, in the person of Casiguran, son of Apu Juban, the old, but respected village chieftain. Casiguran, who continually skulls in the shadows, jealousy watching Bulusan and Agingay even if already has the faithful and understanding Irosin for wife.

Driven by extreme jealousy, Casiguran found the chance to eliminate the hate and when Apu Juban suddenly die of natural causes. The evil Casiguran falsely accused Bulusan of killing his father the village chieftain. He did this by threatening and convincing Putiao, the village soothsayer, to stand false witness against Bulusan as the supposed killer of Apu Juban. Bulusan was brought before the village elders, Gurang Donsol, Gurang Matnog, and Gurang Bacon, after Putiao's false testimony to be fed to the fearsome, man-eating, giant Mampak bird that regularly preyed on the village.

Despite Agingay's pleadings Casiguran remain unmoved, and the innocent Bulusan died after the Mampak bird feasts upon his carcass on top of the volcano. But, Casiguran, intent on banishing all traces of Bulusan, was not satisfied with death of Bulusan as he ordered the already extremely grief-stricken Agingay to throw their first-born son, as soon as it is born, into the mouth of the fiery volcano.

Fearful of Casiguran, who has already assumed the position of village chieftain after the death of Apu Juban, Agingay complied as she climbed the volcano with her infant son by Bulusan. Meanwhile, Irosin realizing Casiguran's treachery, confronted her husband who merely sneer at her. The conscience-stricken Putiao, on the other hand, confesses to the village elder about what he and Casiguran had done. Irosin rushes to tell the village elders, but she meets them on their way, incensed, after learning the truth from Putiao.

Together with other angry villagers, they all rush together to the volcano to save Agingay and her new-born son. On the way, they discover the body of Putiao, hacked to death by the minions of Casiguran. At the volcano's crater they find the already lifeless body of Agingay, killed by her own hand after throwing her infant son into the mouth of the smoldering volcano. They find Casiguran skulking behind a rock and they grab him, and angrily throw him into the volcano's fiery crater. The villagers all mournfully walk down the volcano carrying the lifeless body of Agingay, and their tears mix with the tears of Agingay and the blood of Bulusan, which from two lakes upon the slopes of the volcano.

The two lakes are now known as Lake Bulusan and Lake Agingay, and the volcano upon whose slopes the two beautiful lakes serenely repose, is now known as Mt. Bulusan.

== Si Bulusan nan Si Aguingay Festival ==
A yearly festival in Bulusan called Si Bulusan nan Si Aguingay is held yearly a day before the town's fiesta which is on July 25, the feast day of St. James the Greater. The festival is a parade and street dancing in complete characters and costumes. A contest is held to render the epic story through interpretative dance.
