= Souls in Filipino cultures =

Concept of spirit force in Philippine mythology

Souls in Filipino cultures abound and differ per ethnic group in the Philippines. The concept of souls include both the souls of the living and the souls or ghosts of the dead. The concepts of souls in the Philippines is a notable traditional understanding that traces its origin from the sacred indigenous Philippine folk religions.

== Souls in a general concept ==
=== Souls of the living ===
Every ethnic group has its own beliefs about the soul, including its nature, characteristics, and quantity, especially in connection with human beings. In most cases, a person has two or more souls while they are living. The origin of a person's soul have been told through narratives concerning the indigenous Philippine folk religions, where each ethnic religion has its unique concept on soul origin, soul composition, retaining and caring for the soul, and other matters, such as the eventual passage of the soul after the person's life is relinquished. In some cases, the souls are provided by certain deities such as the case among the Tagbanwa, while in others, the soul comes from certain special regions such as the case among the Bisaya. Some people have two souls such as the Ifugao, while others have five souls such as the Hanunoo Mangyan. In general, a person's physical and mental health influence the overall health of the person's souls. In some instances, if a soul is lost, a person will become sick, and if all living souls are gone, then the body eventually dies. However, there are also cases where the body can still live despite the loss of all of its souls, such as the condition known as mekararuanan among the Ibanag. Overall, taking care of oneself is important for maintaining the preservation of the soul, which is believed to contribute to a longer life for the body.

=== Souls of the dead ===
Ghosts or ancestral spirits, in a general Philippine concept, are the spirits of those who have already died. In other words, they are the souls of the dead. They are different from the souls of the living, where in many instances, a person has two or more living souls, depending on the ethnic group. In some cases, when the body dies, the souls that have been lost eventually re-combine in the afterlife such as the case among the Bukidnon. In other cases, the last main soul travels to the afterlife alone such as the case of the Suludnon, while in other cases, the soul eventually goes returns to its region of origin such as the case among the Bisaya. Among the Bagobo, a distinct belief holds that the right soul journeys to the afterlife, while the left soul transforms into a creature known as the “busaw.”

Each ethnic group in the Philippine islands has their own terms for ancestral spirits or souls of the dead. Due to the sheer diversity of indigenous words for ghosts, terms like espirito and multo, both adopted from Spanish words such as muerto, have been used as all-encompassing terms for the souls or spirits of the dead in mainstream Filipino culture. Unlike in Western beliefs where ghosts are generally known for their sometimes horrific nature, ghosts of the dead for the various ethnic groups in the Philippines are traditionally regarded in high esteem. These ghosts are usually referred to as ancestral spirits who can guide and safeguard their relatives and community. Although ancestral spirits can also cause harm if they are disrespected. In many cases among various Filipino ethnic groups, spirits of the dead are traditionally venerated and deified in accordance to ancient belief systems originating from the indigenous Philippine folk religions.

Popular urban legends about Filipino ghosts usually include the theme of either a white lady, a phantom hitchhiker, or a headless ghost. In most instances where ghosts are harmful, Christian themes have been integrated, as ghosts in the traditional Filipino folk religions are generally not harmful unless provoked.

== Souls in ethnic-specific concepts ==
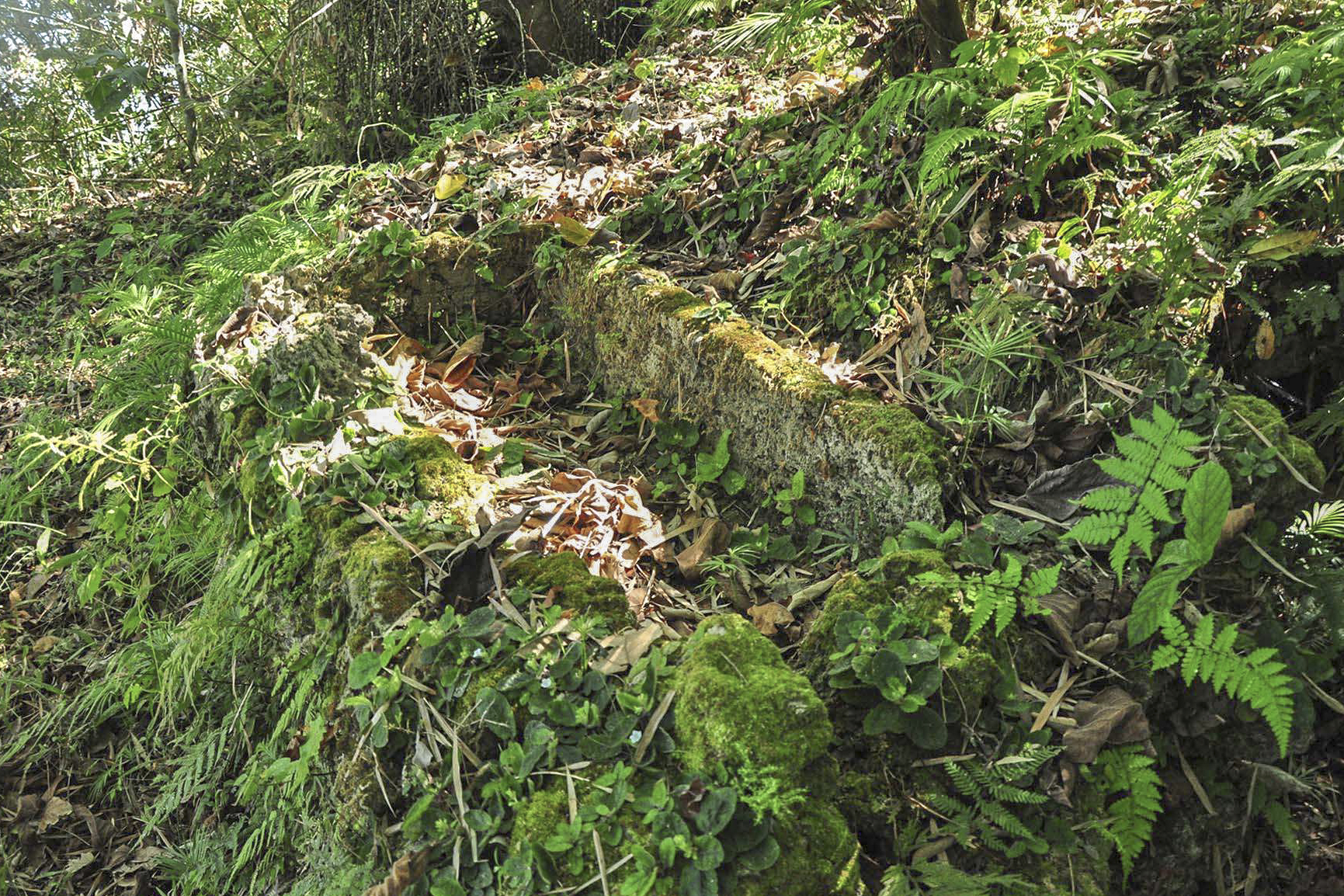
One of the many Limestone tombs of Kamhantik (890–1030 AD), which is said to have been created by forest deities according to local traditions. The site was looted by the Americans before proper archaeological research was conducted.

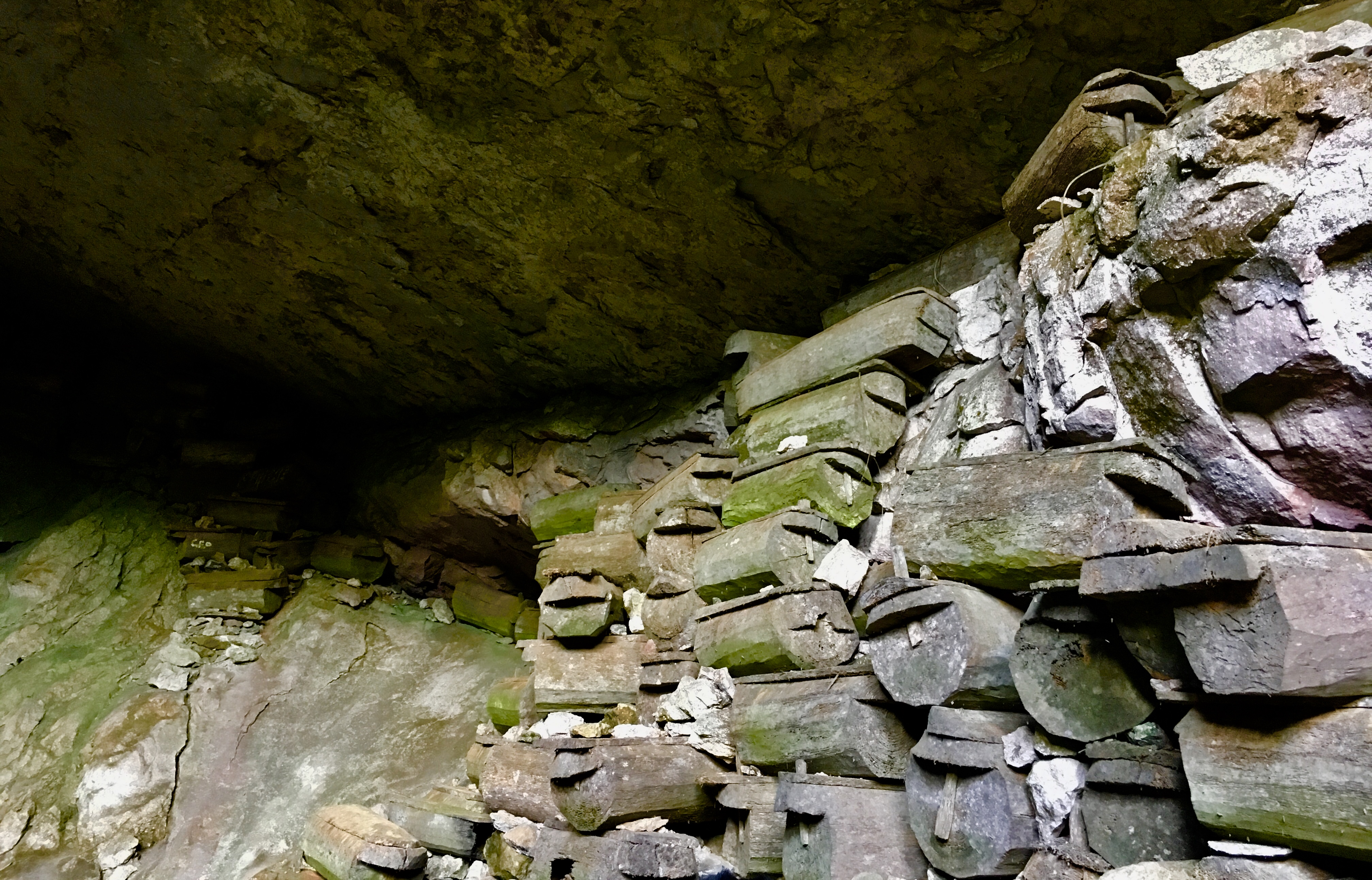
A Kankanaey burial cave in Sagada with coffins stacked up to form a sky burial within a cave

The concept of soul(s) is integral to all ethnic groups in the Philippines. Each ethnic group has their own distinct concept of what a soul is, how many are there, and how a soul follows the cycle of life and death or how it follows the linear path of life, death, and beyond. Among the many concepts of soul/s are as follow:

- Ifugao – a person has two souls, one located in the eyes, the other in a person's breath; the withdrawal of the eyes soul causes illness, while the withdrawal of the breath soul causes death; souls of murdered victims go to the lowest level of the skyworld
- Ibaloi – a soul is believed to formally rest on the summit of Mount Pulag, which is a traditional sanctuary for departed loved ones
- Kalinga – the souls of the dead roam around earth during 10–11 in the morning and 2–3 in the afternoon; the other hours of the day and night are reserved for the living
- Tagalog – the soul, called kaluluwa, can leave the body involuntarily; the soul is called a kakambal when the person is alive; the kakambal wanders once a person is sleeping; this soul-travelling is one of the causes of nightmares, when the soul encounters a terrifying event; the kakambal transforms into the kaluluwa when the person dies; it then travels or gets delivered by the sacred buwayas (crocodiles with coffin-like backs) of the god, Buwaya, to the underworld, either in Maca (for good souls, ruled by Sitan and Bathala) or Kasanaan (for sinful souls, ruled by Sitan); during specific times of the year, the kaluluwa may enter the mortal world freely during pangangaluwa rituals
- Ilokano – there are four soul systems; the first is kadkadduwa which is the “inseparable partner” and “constant companion”; the second is kararma is a person's natural vigor, mind, and reason which can be displayed when one is frightened; the kararma can also be taken and must be retrieved back as failure to regain kararma will lead to insanity; the third is aniwaas which left the sleeping body to visit familiar places; a person who wakes up before the return of aniwaas may lose it and become insane; the last is araria which is the liberated soul of the dead who visits relatives and friends in the mortal world
- Ibanag – the body is called baggi while the soul is called ikaruruwa; the Ibanags believe that the soul's purpose is to give direction and wholeness to a person, but a person can survive even without a soul; without a body, the soul can also experience material wants and needs; a phenomenon called mekararuanan is unique to the Ibanag where the soul leaves the body but without sense
- Hanunoo Mangyan – an individual, whether human or not, is believed to possess 2–5 other souls, which the Hanunoo Mangyan believe to be the explanation for miraculous recoveries, their dreams, or individual reactions to startling sounds and movements; a human soul is called a karaduwa tawu, while other animal souls differ per species, namely karaduwa manok (chicken soul), karaduwa baboy (pig soul), karaduwa kuti (cat soul), and karaduwa hipon (shrimp soul).
- Bisaya – the soul, called dungan, can be taken by bad spirits; souls can also be imprisoned in a sacred spirit cave guarded by Tan Mulong, who has a spirit dog with one mammary gland and two genitals; sickness is believed to be the temporary loss of the dungan, while death is its permanent loss; old tradition says that before inhabiting the body of an unborn being, a dungan first lives in a special region, home to other dungans; the dungan is fragile from usog (unintentional transfer of disturbing vapors of a strong body to a weak one by proximity), and thus, must be nurtured and strengthened through time and rituals; once a person dies, the dungan flies to its upperworld region of origin to await another unborn body to become its avatar; in another story, the soul (probably of a sinful person), upon death, is sent to the underworld; the soul of the dead remains forever in Kasakitan, the lowerworld, unless if a living relative or friend offers sacrifices for redemption towards Pandaque (Pandaki), the god of second chances and messenger of Sidapa, goddess of death; a soul that stays in Kasakitan is kept by Sisiburanen as slaves and after years of staying in the underworld sub-realm of Kanitu-nituhan without redemption sacrifices being offered, the souls are fed to the sub-realm's giant gate guardians, Simuran and Siguinarugan
- Karay-a and Hiligaynon – the Ilonggo peoples, which includes the Karay-a and the Hiligaynon peoples, call the soul as dungan, which cannot be seen; it can voluntarily come out of the body to take in the form of insects and small animals, notably when a person is sleeping; if the body is badly treated, the dungan leaves; the soul's lifespan on earth is measured by the god of death, Sidapa, using a sacred magical tree which grows sturdy on Mount Madia-as (Madyaas); the soul may be saved through the aid of Pandaki, the god of second chances and loyal friend of Sidapa who occasionally visits Mount Madia-as
- Sulodnon – the soul is called umalagad; the soul is watched over by three divine brothers; the first brother is Mangganghaw, who keeps track over a person's affairs after marriage, including pregnancy, where he visits the house of a laboring mother to peep and see if the child was born; the second brother is Manglaegas, who, after having the reports of Mangganghaw, enters the house to see the child to make sure the child is alive; the last brother is Patag’aes, who, after getting the reports from Mangganghaw, waits until midnight to enter a house and have a sacred conversation of life and death with the infant; if someone eavesdrops, the infant dies through choking; the sacred conversation revolves around on how the infant wants to live and the infant's preferential way to die; the infant always gets to choose his or her death preference; after the conversation, Patag’aes uses a measuring stick, computes the infant's life span, and leaves the house; once a person dies, the soul travels to an anthill near the deathbed; around the anthill, the stream Muruburu appears, where the soul removes its funeral vestments and bathes in its lake to remove the scent of incense called kamangyan; after changing clothes, the souls goes into a journey into Lima’awen; in that realm, the soul faces Bangla’e, who ferries the soul across the realm until it arrives in the stream Himbarawen, which has a bridge guarded by Balagu; the soul afterwards travels to the entrance of Mount Madia-as (Madyaas) until it reaches a cockpit, where the soul's relatives welcome it; cockfight betting, feasts, and dressing is made; if the soul is underdressed, it will haunt its living relatives for negligence; after the feasts, the soul is brought to a rest house where it waits for a ritual to restore its body in the lowerworld
- Waray – the soul of the dead is said to be guided by the god Badadum, who gathers the souls of the newly dead to meet their relatives and friends at the mouth of a river located in the lowerworld; old stories say that souls eventually lead to a sacred cave in the interior of Samar island
- Tagbanwa – the true soul is called the kiyaraluwa and is different from the five other secondary souls; the true soul is given to each infant by the god Magindusa when the nose of a child emerges from the vulva; the secondary souls are located in the hands, feet, and the head below the air whorl (puyo) of the hair; the specific soul at the puyo is not properly aligned and must be re-aligned by a shaman to prevent illnesses caused by its non-alignment; the soul at the puyo has a material form similar to a round white stone; the soul of the dead travels into a cave entrance to the underworld; it then meets its ruler Taliyakud, who tends a fire between two sacred tree trunks; a sinful soul is burned while a good soul passes onto a happier place where food is abundant; a soul may die seven times in the underworld, with each death the soul goes deeper into its realms; the soul is buried in the underworld by insects and lizards when it dies there; if the soul dies seven times, it is reincarnated into an insect such as a fly, dragonfly or dung beetle; if the insect reincarnation is killed, the soul disappears into oblivion
- Bukidnon – the soul, called makatu, exists before a child's birth but is separate from the body; a special crib for the makatu is established prior to the child birth; the deity, Miyaw-Biyaw, breathes seven makatu into a person; with the withdrawal of each makatu from a body, the weaker a person becomes; if all makatu withdraws from a body, the individual dies; upon death, all seven makatu combine into one and journeys into Mount Balatucan for final judgment; the soul first travels to the huge rock, Liyang, which is followed by a journey to Binagbasan, where the Tree of Records grows. After making a mark on the tree, the soul journeys to Pinagsayawan, where the soul must dance and sweat for atonement; the next journey is to Panamparan, where the soul gets a haircut to be presentable at Kumbirahan, where a banquet awaits the soul; the god Andalapit then leads the soul to the foot of Mount Balatucan, where the gods of the dead assemble to judge the soul; good souls are sent to Dunkituhan, the cloud capped stairway that leads into heaven at the summit of Balatucan; an evil soul is sent to a river of penance for atone until forgiven; souls at the river sweat blood, the source of the river's color and fishy scent; a forgiven soul afterwards also goes into Balatucan's summit
- Bagobo – there are two souls called gimokud; the right hand gimokud is the good soul that manifests as a shadow on the right hand side of the path while the left hand gimokud is the bad soul that manifests as a shadow on the left side of the path; if the right soul leaves the body, it notifies the person in an insect form; if the left soul leaves, it causes effects such as shivers, depending on the place where it travels; upon death, the left soul transforms into a busaw, a monster that digs up dead bodies; all larger animals have two souls as well, but smaller birds, bees, insects, and inanimate objects only have one soul; the souls of inanimate objects directly go to the underworld to serve its previous owner; the right hand soul travels to the underworld by passing a black river and arriving at a town ruled by Mebuyan, who is both goddess and priestess in the underworld; the soul bathes itself, and once contented, becomes unwilling to return to the earthworld

== In the arts ==
Souls have been featured multiple times in films, but most portray ghosts whose context are influenced by Christian, Western, or Chinese views, rather than traditional beliefs from the indigenous Philippine folk religions. Some of these films include Feng Shui (2004), Wag Kang Lilingon (2006), Shake, Rattle and Roll X: Class Picture (2008), The Healing (2012), and Seklusyon (2016).

== See also ==
- Anito
- List of Philippine mythological figures
- List of reportedly haunted locations in the Philippines
- Malay ghost myths
- Philippine mythology
- Soul dualism
