= Trap (2015 film) =

2015 Filipino film

- Film poster
- Directed by: Brillante Mendoza
- Written by: Honeylyn Joy Alipio
- Produced by: Larry I. Castillo
- Starring: Nora Aunor; Julio Diaz; Lou Veloso; Aaron Rivera
- Cinematography: Odyssey Flores
- Edited by: Diego Marx Dobles
- Music by: Diwa de Leon
- Production company: Centerstage Productions
- Release dates: May 19, 2015 (Cannes); September 16, 2015 (Philippines)
- Running time: 97 minutes
- Country: Philippines
- Languages: Filipino; English

Trap (Tagalog: Taklub) is a 2015 Filipino drama film directed by Brillante Mendoza and starring Nora Aunor, Julio Diaz, Lou Veloso and Aaron Rivera. Taklub centers on the survivors in the aftermath of the Super Typhoon Haiyan that devastated the central part of the Philippines, especially Tacloban, Leyte and how they picked up their lives a year after the typhoon. It was screened in the Un Certain Regard section at the 2015 Cannes Film Festival. At Cannes it won a commendation awarded by the Ecumenical Jury.

== Plot ==
Taklub (2015) follows the lives of several survivors in the aftermath of Typhoon Haiyan (Yolanda) in the Philippines. The story centers on Mina (Nora Aunor), a mother who is desperately searching for her missing husband and child after the devastating storm. Alongside her, two other characters, Liza (Meryll Soriano) and Bert (Julio Diaz), also struggle with the trauma of losing loved ones.

As the survivors navigate the wreckage, they face both physical and emotional challenges while trying to rebuild their lives in the midst of the ongoing disaster relief efforts. Mina, Liza, and Bert must confront their grief and despair while dealing with bureaucratic obstacles and the harsh realities of their devastated community.

The film highlights themes of resilience, survival, and the emotional toll of disaster recovery, providing a deeply human look at the aftermath of one of the deadliest typhoons in history.

== Cast ==
- Nora Aunor as Bebeth
- Julio Diaz as Larry
- Lou Veloso as Renato
- Aaron Rivera as Erwin
- Ruby Ruiz as Kagawad Duke
- Soliman Cruz
- Rome Mallari as Marlon
- Shine Santos
- John Rendez
- Glenda Kennedy

== Production ==
After Typhoon Haiyan struck the Philippines in 2013, director Brillante Mendoza was asked by others if he would make a film about the disaster, to which he thought could be insensitive for him to exploit the tragedies that have occurred for the victims' lives. Some months later, he was asked by the Department of Environment and Natural Resources to create a documentary film about climate change. For it to have a better impact towards audiences, Mendoza suggested to make a narrative film instead.

In preparing for her role, Nora Aunor interviewed some of the people in Tacloban, Leyte, a city heavily damaged by the typhoon.

== Release ==
Trap was screened on May 19, 2015, in the Un Certain Regard section at the 68th Cannes Film Festival. It was also shown at the Sarajevo Film Festival. The film was also part of the 9th Film and Arts Festival Two Riverside in Poland, the 15th T-Mobile New Horizons International Film Festival in Poland, the 28th Helsinki International Film Festival and the 20th Busan International Film.

== Reception ==
Maggie Lee of Variety called it "an intimate yet detached portrait of survivors of Typhoon Yolanda". Clarence Tsui of The Hollywood Reporter wrote that the film "proves to be very much in line with the director's trademark vision of the world as a bleak, imperfect if not even hopeless place". Screen International described it as "a choral film shot in urgent, handheld, docu-drama style that illuminates the tragedy and its aftermath via an intertwined series of personal stories".

== Awards ==
Group	Category	Nominee	Result
1st MónFilmat Festival Internacional de Cinema	Best Film		Won
2015 Cannes Film Festival	Ecunumical Jury Prize (Special Mention)		Won
16th Asiatica Film Mediale	Audience Award		Won
15th Beirut International Film Festival			Won
39th Gawad Urian	Best Picture		Won
39th Gawad Urian	Best Director	Brillante Mendoza	Nominated
39th Gawad Urian	Best Actress	Nora Aunor	Nominated
39th Gawad Urian	Best Supporting Actor	Julio Diaz	Nominated
39th Gawad Urian	Best Supporting Actor	Lou Veloso	Nominated
39th Gawad Urian	Best Screenplay	Honeylyn Joy Alipio	Nominated
39th Gawad Urian	Best Cinematography	Odessey Flores	Nominated
39th Gawad Urian	Best Editing	Diego Max Dobles	Nominated
39th Gawad Urian	Best Music	Diwa De Leon	Nominated
39th Gawad Urian	Best Sound	Andrew Millalos, Addiss Tabong, Dennis Payumo, Paulito Homillano	Nominated
18th Gawad Pasado (Pampelikulang Samahan ng mga Dalubguro)	Dambana ng Kagalingan bilang Pinakapasadong Aktress ( Hall of Fame )	Nora Aunor	Won
18th Gawad Pasado (Pampelikulang Samahan ng mga Dalubguro)	Dangal ng PASADO sa Kamlayang Pangkalikasan		Won
18th Gawad Pasado (Pampelikulang Samahan ng mga Dalubguro)	Pinakapasadong Pelikula		Nominated
18th Gawad Pasado (Pampelikulang Samahan ng mga Dalubguro)	Pinakapasadong Direktor	Brillante Mendoza	Nominated
18th Gawad Pasado (Pampelikulang Samahan ng mga Dalubguro)	Pinakapasadong Katuwang na aktor	Julio Diaz	Nominated
18th Gawad Pasado (Pampelikulang Samahan ng mga Dalubguro)	Pinakapasadong Katuwang na aktor	Lou Veloso	Nominated
Young Critics Circle	Best Film		Nominated
Young Critics Circle	Best Performance by Male or Female, Adult or Child, Individual or Ensemble in Leading or Supporting Role	Nora Aunor	Nominated
Young Critics Circle	Best Screenplay	Honeylyn Joy Alipio	Nominated
Young Critics Circle	Best Achievement in Cinematography and Visual Design	Odyssey Flores (Cinematography); Henry Alcasid & Dante Mendoza (Production Design)	Nominated
32nd Star Awards for Movies	Indie Movie of the Year		Nominated
32nd Star Awards for Movies	Indie Movie Director of the Year	Dante Mendoza	Nominated
32nd Star Awards for Movies	Movie Actress of the Year	Nora Aunor	Nominated
32nd Star Awards for Movies	Indie Movie Screenwriter of the year	Honeylyn Joy Alipio	Nominated
32nd Star Awards for Movies	Indie Movie Cinematographer of the Year	Odessey Flores	Nominated
32nd Star Awards for Movies	Indie Production Designer of the Year	Dante Mendoza	Nominated
32nd Star Awards for Movies	Indie Movie Musical Scorer of the Year	Diwa De Leon	Nominated
32nd Star Awards for Movies	Indie Movie Sound Engineer of the Year	Andrew Millalos and Addiss Tabong	Nominated
