= Sarangay =

Creature in Visayan mythology

Creature information
- Grouping: Philippine minotaur
- Similar entities: Minotaur

Origin
- Region: Philippines

Sarangay is a creature in Philippine mythology resembling a minotaur with a gemstone attached to its ears. When the Spanish first heard the story in the 17th century, they thought the legends described the Greek minotaur. Sarangay is described as half bull (specifically, a male water buffalo) and half man.

According to folklore, the creatures guard their jewels and attempted thieves will be killed mercilessly. It was said that when a Sarangay becomes enraged, smoke issues from its nostrils.

== In popular culture ==
- In the mobile game EverWing, Sarangay is an unlockable creature.
- In the table-top roleplaying game Pathfinder, Sarangay appear as a playable race in the 2nd edition's Tian Xia character guide.
