= Alan (legendary creature) =

Legendary creature

Origin
- Country: Philippines
- Region: Tinguian

The Alan are deformed spirits from the folklore of the Tinguian tribe of the Philippines. They have wings and can fly, and their fingers and toes point backwards.

The Alan are said to take drops of menstrual blood, miscarried fetuses, afterbirth, or other reproductive waste and transform them into human children, whom they then raise as their own. They live near springs in extremely fine houses, made of gold and other valuables.
