= Berberoka =

Philippine mythical creature

Creature information
- Grouping: Philippine water spirit
- Similar entities: Water Nymph, Naiad

Origin
- Region: Philippines

The Berberoka is a swamp creature that is said to appear in the provinces of Apayao, Abra and Ilocos Norte in northern Luzon, Philippines. It lures victims by sucking all the water out of a pond so the fish lay dead on the ground. When humans come to pick up the fish, the Berberoka releases all the water and eats them as they struggle to stay afloat. Despite all their powers, these water ogres have a morbid, ironic fear of crabs.

They have the ability to suck up all the water in a swamp or lake. Also, many elderly people believed that they use water to attack their enemies. They discharge a large amount of water (just like a fire hose) at their victims until they drown.
