= Nuno sa punso =

Nature spirit in Philippine mythology

- Other names: nuno
- Gender: Male
- Region: Philippines

A nuno sa punso ("old man of the mound"), or simply nuno ("old man" or "grandparent" "ancestor"), is a dwarf-like nature spirit in Philippine mythology. It is believed to live in an anthill or termite mound, hence its name, literally 'Ancestor/Grandparent living in the anthill'.

== Description ==
The nuno are the spirits of the ancestors. When a tree is to be felled, or a piece of virgin ground broken, or on many other occasions, permission is asked of the nuno, in order to avoid the misfortune that would come from angering it. The nuno is described to be a tiny old man, but differs from a dwende or dwarf of Philippine folklore. The dwende is a playful hobgoblin who shows himself to children, while the nuno is a goblin easily angered that will do harm to those who damage or disturb his mound, and will seek retribution, for example by causing the foot of someone who kicked his mound to become swollen. Nuno sa punso are also believed to reside in places such as underneath large rocks, trees, riverbanks, caves, or a garden.

== Folk beliefs ==
=== Magical abilities ===
Nunos have the ability to curse trespassers. A curse may include the following:

- Illness
  - Boils
  - Swelling or pain on any part of the body
  - Vomiting of blood
  - Urinating black liquid
- Excessive hair growth on the back

In order for a nuno to successfully curse a person, the trespasser must be in close proximity to the nuno. If the trespasser is within range, the Nuno can spit on any part of the trespasser's body. The trespasser will then experience aches or soreness on the affected part of the body, such as stomach pains, swollen genitals (after urinating on the mound), or swollen feet (after kicking the mound).

=== Countering nuno curses ===
It is a common belief in the Philippines that if modern medicine is unable to cure a particular illness, the ailment may be due to a nuno's curse. The victim is brought to an albularyo, a Philippine practitioner of traditional medicine. The albularyo will perform a type of divination known as pagtatawas. During this ritual, a burning piece of alum (tawas) or a candle is melted and poured onto a disc or spoon. The molten matter is then dribbled over a basin of water, allowing the alum or wax to cool and form shapes on the water's surface. These will then be interpreted by the albularyo as signs pointing to the cause of the patient's illness and whether a curse has transpired.

In order to be cured, the victim's family may be asked to provide an offering to the nuno such as fruits or other food, drink, or a material object. If the victim is still sick after the offering, it may be necessary to personally ask the nuno's forgiveness, which is believed to be a wise measure in order to prevent permanent possession of the victim by an evil spirit, which could later cause insanity.

It is also possible to kill the nuno by catching it and crushing its head between a person's fingers or thighs. This will remove any spell cast by the nuno. But this method is often not recommended as it could incur the wrath of a nuno's kin and friends.

Nunos are protectors of the Earth, and have the ability to sense goodness and evil. If you radiate purity, they are able to tell, and will often reveal themselves. If you have skepticism, cynicism or darkness, they will avoid you or make you ill so you stay away from the area. When countryside becomes modernized and urbanized, the nunos often flee, die, or go further down into the earth.

=== Precautions ===
To avoid the wrath of a nuno sa punso, children are reminded not to play outside between noon and three o'clock in the afternoon. They are also asked by their parents to come home before six o'clock in the evening. Children are also instructed to avoid being noisy at places where nuno are believed to dwell. Children are also warned to ask permission or give fair notice before passing by such places inhabited by the nuno, which is done by saying "tabi tabi po"(literally "please be on the side" or "please move aside", that is, you tell the nuno to stand aside), or "please let me pass by" or "I mean no harm as I pass through your territory, Old Man of the Mound".

=== Disrespect ===
Although most people that believe in the spirit respect the nuno and will abide by the many unwritten rules that ensure a peaceful coexistence between human beings and nuno, others will, for a variety of reasons, actively seek to disrespect or offend them. A disrespectful person will purposely trample around in tall grassy areas, places where nuno are also believed to inhabit or will intentionally urinate on suspected nuno anthills to display dominance over the mound dweller.

== In modern culture ==
- The 1950 romantic fantasy film Nuno sa Punso depicts a main hero reducing his size in order to save his love within the mounds where a nuno lives.
