= Bal-Bal =

Philippine mythical creature

Creature information
- Grouping: Undead Corpse eater
- Similar entities: Aswang, Amalanhig, Busaw

Origin
- Region: Philippines

In Philippine mythology, a Bal-Bal is an undead monster that steals corpses whether it is in a funeral or grave and feeds on them. It has a strong sense of smell for dead human bodies. It also has claws and teeth sharp enough to rip the clothing of the dead. Since it eats nothing but corpses, it has a foul breath. Once this monster has spotted and eaten the corpse, it will leave the trunk of a banana tree in the coffin creating an illusion of the stolen body to trick people.

Bal-Bal was also associated to Aswang, Amalanhig, and even to Busaw, which were all flesh eaters. They were classified to one of the most fearful creatures in the Philippines because of their appearance. They were even described and compared to the vampire of the western continents.
