= Sigbin =

Philippine mythical creature

Sigbin or Sigben
Creature information
- Grouping: Familiar, Cryptid
- Similar entities: Amamayong (Hiligaynon)

Origin
- Region: Philippines

The Sigbin or Sigben is a creature in Philippine mythology said to come out at night to suck the blood of victims from their shadows. It is said to walk backwards with its head lowered between its hind legs, and to have the ability to become invisible to other creatures, especially humans. It resembles a hornless goat, but has very large ears which it can clap like a pair of hands and a long, flexible tail that can be used as a whip. The sigbin is said to emit a nauseating odor.

It is believed to issue forth from its lair during Holy Week, looking for children that it will kill for their hearts, which it fashions into amulets.

According to the legend, there are families known as Sigbinan ("those who know") whose members possess the power to command these creatures, and are said to keep the sigbin in jars made of clay. The Aswang are said to keep them as pets. There is speculation that the legend may be based on sightings of an actual animal species that is rarely seen; based on the description of the sigbin in popular literature, the animal species might be related to the kangaroo.

The myth is popularly known in Visayas Islands and Mindanao especially in rural areas. It is also said that it looks like a dog and owned by rich people who hid those creatures in a jar.

Other theories suggest that the sigbin might be a vagrant species of macropodidae living in seclusion that made its way to the Philippines from Australia due to migration way back millions of years ago. It was often described by some as having a red-brownish hue suggesting it might be the red kangaroo, although the diet of the sigbin and the kangaroo are far from similar since the latter is an herbivore. Some theories debunked it as for the fact that the Wallace Line is responsible for separating species that exists within the areas of Sulawesi, Lombok, New Guinea, and Australia from Mainland Southeast Asia, Borneo, Java, Sumatra, Bali, and The Philippines.

== See also ==
- Peuchen
- Chupacabra
- Pedro Penduko
