= Wakwak =

Philippine mythical creature

Creature information
- Grouping: Philippine vampire
- Similar entities: Ekek, Manananggal

Origin
- Region: Philippines

The Wakwak is a vampiric, bird-like creature in Philippine mythology. It is said to snatch humans at night as prey, similar to the manananggal and the Ekek in rural areas of the Philippines. The difference between the Manananggal and the Wakwak is that Wakwak cannot separate its torso from its body while the Manananggal can. Some believe that the Wakwak is a type or form of a vampire. Other people contend that a Wakwak is a Philippine night bird associated with witches.

The sound of a Wakwak (Yaya) is usually associated with the presence of an Unglu (vampire) or Ungo (ghost or monster). It is also believed that this monster is called "Wakwak" due to the sound it makes when it flaps its wings while flying. This sound is only heard when the Wakwak is hunting and becomes softer the closer it becomes. If the sound of the Wakwak is loud, it means it is far away – but if the sound becomes faint, the creature is close and about to attack.

The Wakwak is often described as having long sharp talons and a pair of wings similar to those of a bat. It uses its talons or claws to slash its victims and to get their heart and sometimes ripped their victims body apart. Its wings are also said to be as sharp as a knife.

The sound that a tuko (common house gecko) makes at night when out of sight was discovered by an American who spent much time in the Philippines to be attributed to a Wakwak. Other than that, many bisaya people or people living in southern part of the Philippines believed that the sound "Wak-Wak" is just a sound from a bird which only flies at night and gave terrifying sounds to anyone nearby.

However, over time the idea of a terrifying "Wak-Wak" is becoming rarer amongst the Filipino population with the story becoming only told to scare children.

== See also ==
- Peuchen
- Sigbin
- Aswang
