= Amalanhig =

Philippine mythological figures

- Member of Undead aswang
- Other names: Aswang
- Gender: Male/female
- Region: Hiligaynon

Amalanhig (also called 'Maranhig' or 'Amaranhig') are creatures in Visayan mythology, particularly among Hiligaynon speaking groups. Amalanhig are Aswangs who failed to transfer their monstrosity causing them to rise from their graves to kill humans by biting their necks. Another version that has survived through word-of-mouth recounts that Amanlanhigs are said to chase any living person they found and once they reach them, they would tickle the victim until they die, both of laughter and terror.

The Amalanhig are depicted as externally identical to humans, though there is an enlargement of the upper canines in most individuals. The Amalanhig is a variant of the vampire native to the Philippines.
