= Komiks Presents: Flash Bomba =

2009 Philippine television fantasy drama series

- Genre: Superhero
- Created by: ABS-CBN Studios
- Directed by: Dondon Santos
- Starring: Luis Manzano; Roxanne Guinoo
- Theme music composer: Rico Blanco
- Opening theme: "Liwanag Sa Dilim" by Chivas Malunda
- Country of origin: Philippines
- Original language: Filipino
- No. of episodes: 11

Production
- Production company: Dreamscape Entertainment Television

Original release
- Network: ABS-CBN
- Release: February 14 – April 25, 2009

Related
- Komiks Presents: Dragonna; Nasaan Ka Maruja?

Komiks Presents: Flash Bomba is a Philippine television drama fantasy series broadcast by ABS-CBN. This series is based on the comic strip at the same title by Mars Ravelo, the series is the seventh installment of Komiks. Directed by Dondon S. Santos, it stars Luis Manzano and Roxanne Guinoo. It aired on the network's Yes Weekend line up from February 14 to April 25, 2009, replacing Komiks Presents: Dragonna and was replaced by Komiks: Nasaan Ka Maruja?. The Ravelos commissioned Reno Maniquis some years back to re-design Flash Bomba's costume for modern times and he also did the logo design for Flash Bomba.

Two superheroes meet as the hot heroine Dragonna bids goodbye in her last fight and the bombastic Flash Bomba begins his adventure.

== Origin ==
Flash Bomba was a man who lost the use of his legs in an accident. Because of this, he trained the rest of his body to an incredible level of athletic ability and did everyday stuff using his hands to compensate for the loss of his ability to walk. Eventually he heard a rumor about a "Tikbalang" (a mythological creature with the body of a man and the head of a horse) who would grant powers to anyone who could defeat it in battle. Flash Bomba challenged the Tikbalang and set a time and place for the battle. He defeated it despite his physical limitations and the Tikbalang granted him superpowers. But as a jest, the Tikbalang gave him powers that made him look awkward. Flash was given the Tikbalang's magic hair, said talisman allowing Flash to transform into his super-powered version - a being with large hands and feet, as well as superhuman powers. Using his new abilities, he became a crimefighter called Flash Bomba.

== Synopsis ==
Roldan Legazpi (Luis Manzano) lived a comfortable life with his wealthy parents until a tragic encounter with a tikbalang left him unable to walk but he uses his hands to walk. Roldan Legazpi is being paralyzed due to his encounter of a wicked "tikbalang" (half-human, half-horse creature), he managed to remain sturdy by strengthening his upper body to an incredible level of athletic ability and did ever through martial arts with thorough physical training when he learns to walk with his hands.

Flash Bomba challenged the Tikbalang to a battle with his physical limitations thru Martial Arts. The Tikbalang became a human named Tikboy and granted Roldan Legazpi his superpower of the Tikbalang's magic hair to allow Roldan transforms into his super-powered version - a being with large hands & feet, as well as having superhuman powers. By using his new abilities, he becomes a superhero called Flash Bomba.

Flash Bomba has superhuman strength, the ability to walk up on the walls, to generate “thunderclaps” using his large hands or block almost anything with same, and to jump really high from place to place. In spite of his enlarged extremities. Roldan returns to the woods to find the mystical powers that the tikbalangs possess success his mission. Roldan assumes a new superhero alter-ego known as Flash Bomba to use his gifts to protect the helpless and fight crimes while enjoying fame on the side.

Flash Bomba turns out to be the missing piece in the much-anticipated "Isang Lakas" superteam composed of past Komiks Presents heroes which includes Kapitan Boom, Varga, Lastikman, Dragonna and Tiny Tony. They are part of the much-anticipated “Isang Lakas” super team.

The Isang Lakas crew is a superhero group conceptualized by ABS-CBN inspired by America's Super Friends and Justice League.

== Cast and characters ==
- Luis Manzano as Flash Bomba/Roldan Legazpi - After a freak accident by the "Tikbalang", he discovered his superhero secret identity as Flash Bomba.
- Roxanne Guinoo as Marissa - The former childhood sweetheart of Roldan who is now the fiancée of Gorio so, she choices Roldan over Gorio because Gorio turned into Dark Horse. Marissa is with Roldan & his family.
- Sid Lucero as Gregory 'Gorio' San Martin/New Dark Horse - is the best friend of Roldan. His envy of Roldan will drive him to acquire the evil powers. After his father's downfall, he assumed his role as the new Dark Horse.
- Lito Pimentel as Enrico Legazpi, Roldan's father - is the equally boastful father of Roldan. He will help his son get back on his feet after a tragic accident. He instantly found out his son's secret identity is Flash Bomba when Dark Horse attacks the Legazpi family.
- Nanette Inventor as Nanny Yaya Claude - Roldan's caring nanny. She instantly found out Roldan's secret identity is Flash Bomba when Dark Horse attacks the Legazpi family.
- Allan Paule as Lucas San Martin/Dark Horse, Gorio's father - who harbors a deep hate against Roldan's family. He died prior to when Roldan became successful but turns out he sent the Tikbalang that killed Rhodora and became the Dark Horse. He will meet his downfall against Flash Bomba.
- Empoy Marquez as Tikboy - was a Tikbalang who turned into human who will grant Roldan his superpowers. He will become Flash Bomba's sidekick
- Rio Locsin as Rhodora Legazpi, Rolden's mother - who will teach him the importance of helping other people. She was attacked by the "Tikbalang" and was killed by it. It was revealed that she survived the attack and is living as a homeless person looking for her family. She owns The Rhodora Legazpi Memorial Foundation.
- Flavio Manatuyi as Robert Sneddon - Rolden's old schoolfriend with whom he calls in a favour to escape from Gorio's grasp. This achieved by the "Snedster's" ability to create explosives out of rotting fruit peels.

=== Special participation ===
- Jacob Tingson as young Roldan Legazpi
- Elijah Magundayao as young Gorio
- Mariel Pamintuan as young Marissa

== See also ==
- List of Komiks episodes
- Isang Lakas
