= Pepeng Kuryente: Man with a Thousand Volts =

1988 Filipino film starring Ramon Revilla Sr.

- Directed by: Jose Yandóc
- Written by: Jose Yandóc
- Produced by: Azucena M. Bautista
- Starring: Ramon Revilla
- Cinematography: Ramon Marcelino
- Edited by: Tonie Sy
- Music by: Mon del Rosario
- Production company: Imus Productions
- Release date: November 16, 1988
- Running time: 115 minutes
- Country: Philippines
- Language: Filipino

Pepeng Kuryente: Man with a Thousand Volts is a 1988 Filipino science fiction action film written and directed by Jose Yandóc and starring Ramon Revilla as the titular character. Also starring are Ramon "Bong" Revilla Jr., Dante Rivero, Marissa Delgado, Ramon Zamora, Melissa Mendez, Gwen Avila, Alicia Alonzo, Cecille "Dabiana" Iñigo, Baldo Marro, King Gutierrez, Rodolfo Boy Garcia, Palito and George Estregan Jr. Produced by Imus Productions, Pepeng Kuryente was released on November 16, 1988. Critic Lav Diaz gave the film a negative review, criticizing its lack of direction, slow pace, superfluous scenes, and constant product placement.

== Cast ==
- Ramon Revilla as Pepeng Kuryente/Mang Jose (young Pepe and young Maricris's father)
- Ramon "Bong" Revilla Jr. as young Pepe
- Dante Rivero as Dennis
- Marissa Delgado as Marcelina
- Ramon Zamora as Bruno
- Melissa Mendez as Isabel
- Gwen Avila as Maricris
- Alicia Alonzo as Aling Rosa (young Pepe and young Maricris's mother)
- Rose Ann Gonzales as young Maricris
- Cecille "Dabiana" Iñigo as court clerk
- George Estregan Jr. as young Richard
- Baldo Marro as inmate (young Pepe and young Siso's arch-enemy)
- King Gutierrez as inmate (Pepe and Siso's arch-enemy)
- Rodolfo "Boy" Garcia as Mang Doro
- Palito as Toothpick
- Lito Anzures as Bo. Captain of Julugan, Tanza, Cavite
- Bomber Moran as Lucas
- Lucita Soriano as Mang Doro's Wife
- Marco Polo Garcia as young Siso
- Edwin Reyes as Anselmo
- Renato del Prado as Siso
- Ingrid Salas as Auntie Juana
- Johnny Delgado as Richard
- Amay Bisaya as Bisaya
- Augusto Victa as the judge
- Miniong Alvarez as Miniong

== Release ==
Pepeng Kuryente was released on November 16, 1988.

=== Critical response ===
Lav Diaz, writing for the Manila Standard, criticized the film's slow pace, lack of direction, filler situations (e.g. burning of the beach house), and constant product placement for the beer brand Carlsberg. Diaz also noted that though the film's Lola Basyang-like tone could appeal to children, its violence makes it inappropriate.

== Cancelled TV Adaptation ==
There was supposed to be a TV adaptation of Pepeng Kuryente like Tiagong Akyat, Elias Paniki, and many more in the series Agimat: Ang Mga Alamat ni Ramon Revilla. It was also supposed to star Ejay Falcon just like stated in this article.
