= Nasaan Ka Maruja? =

2009 Philippine television fantasy drama series

- Also known as: Mars Ravelo's Nasaan Ka Maruja?
- Genre: Horror
- Created by: ABS-CBN Studios
- Based on: Maruja by Mars Ravelo
- Directed by: Jerome C. Pobocan
- Starring: Kristine Hermosa; Derek Ramsay
- Country of origin: Philippines
- Original language: Filipino
- No. of episodes: 15

Production
- Production company: Dreamscape Entertainment Television

Original release
- Network: ABS-CBN
- Release: May 2 – August 8, 2009

Related
- Flash Bomba

Nasaan Ka Maruja (lit. where are you Maruja?) is a Philippine television drama fantasy series broadcast by ABS-CBN. This series is based on the 1967 Philippine film Maruja and 1950s comics by Mars Ravelo. Directed by Jerome C. Pobocan, it stars Kristine Hermosa and Derek Ramsay. It aired on the network's Yes Weekend line up from May 2 to August 8, 2009, replacing Komiks Presents: Flash Bomba and was replaced by Agimat: Ang Mga Alamat ni Ramon Revilla: Tiagong Akyat.

== Origins ==
=== Earlier versions ===
Maruja is one of Mars Ravelo's masterpieces. He first published it in comics during the 1950s. In 1967, the first film entitled Maruja was released starring the queen of Philippine movies, Susan Roces. The movie was remade in 1978 as Gumising Ka Maruja and again in 1996 as Maruja starring Carmina Villarroel.

=== Series adaptation ===
In 2007, ABS-CBN bought the rights to make Maruja into a TV series. Maruja was supposed to be included in Sineserye Presents: The Susan Roces Cinema Collection, which featured Susan Roces' most classical films. It was supposed to star Sheryl Cruz and Ruffa Gutierrez. But even before production began, the Ravelos stated that Mars Ravelo's name should be included in the title because Maruja is his work and not the movie firm's. ABS-CBN then decided to put the show's production on hold until the problem was fixed. A year later, ABS-CBN then released Nasaan Ka Maruja? as part of Komiks Presents which featured Mars Ravelos masterpieces. New actors and actresses were also involved in the project, because of some problems.

== Synopsis ==
Cristy dreams of a certain couple, Maruja and Gabriel (Piolo Pascual), who had a hard time being together because of their different status in life. They were both killed after getting married. Little did Cristy know that she and Ross, her half-sister's fiancé, would bring back to life the unfinished love story of Maruja and Gabriel.

=== Reincarnation ===
The storyline deals with the concept of reincarnation: Maruja (Kristine Hermosa) reincarnated as Cristy & Gabriel (Derek Ramsay) reincarnated as Ross. Cristy Rivera (Kristine Hermosa) is a magazine columnist who possesses psychic & paranormal abilities that help her see ghosts. She has a half-sister named Helen (Karylle) who is engaged to Ross Lozano. Ross used to draw sketches of Maruja even before they met in real life. What is the connection between Cristy & Ross to Maruja & Gabriel? Will Ross leave Helen for Cristy? And what will be Helen's move? Cristy having an open third eye can see ghosts or dead people and communicate and talk to them.

=== Mediumship ===
Cristy believes that she can see the spirits or ghosts of dead people. This brings the idea of having a third eye but is also able to dream about the past or even see the future through dreams. Later, a ghost of her mother shows to her what exactly is this ability and that she should use this gift to help other spirits cross the light, at the same time, knowing her true identity.

== Cast and characters ==
=== Main cast ===
- Kristine Hermosa as Maruja S. Martinez/Cristy Mondes Rivera† – Gabriel's love interest in the past when she was Maruja and as Cristy, a magazine columnist who possesses psychic and paranormal abilities and helps dead people who are not in peace. She falls in love with her sister's fiancé, Ross. She is haunted by the persistent and vague dreams of Maruja and Gabriel.
- Derek Ramsay as Rodrigo Santiago/Ross Lozano – Maruja's fiancé in the past when he was Romualdo and when he is Ross, he is marrying Cristy's half-sister, Helen. He falls in love with Cristy. He has visions of Cristy as Maruja. Ross also experiences dreams of Maruja & Gabriel. He drew Maruja when he was younger and then started drawing Cristy. Ross confessed he had feelings for Cristy because he had a dream of her as Maruja. Ross reveals the truth to Helen (Karylle) that he is in love with another woman which is Helen's half-sister, Cristy. In the past, he killed Gabriel (Piolo Pascual) and Maruja and after that he killed himself. In the present, he accidentally killed Cristy but Cristy survived.

=== Supporting cast ===
- John Estrada as Michael – an editor-in-chief in a magazine where Cristy works, who is also in love with her.
- Karylle as Helen Rivera† – Cristy's half-sister who is engaged to Ross. Helen discovers Cristy is the girl in Ross' sketches. She discovers Ross & Cristy's relationship. She died after learning about Ross and Cristy's relationship. She has been haunting Cristy but doesn't want to connect. Helen is willing to protect Cristy from Ross.
- Enchong Dee as Brian Lorenzo – Ross' brother: He learns the secret of Ross as Gabriel in the past.
- Gloria Romero as Lola Rosing – Cristy and Helen's grandmother. It was later revealed that she also has the same ability as Cristy.
- Kitkat as Debbie – Cristy's best friend who works together with Cristy as a magazine columnist.
- Bing Pimentel as Shirley Rivera – Alfred's second wife. She finds it hard to accept Cristy as her stepdaughter
- Menggie Cobarrubias as Alfred Rivera – Cristy and Helen's father.
- Raquel Villavicencio as Mirasol Lozano – Brian and Ross' mother. She divorced their father after knowing that he was having an affair with another woman.

=== Guests by episode ===
==== Episode 1: Stefanie ====
- Tirso Cruz III as Dr. Joselito L. Ocampo Jr. – a doctor who suffers miserably due to the recent death of his wife. He later committed suicide.
- Assunta De Rossi as Stefanie Miranda – Dr. Ocampo's wife, who wants Cristy to tell her husband that it is time to move on and stop him from committing suicide.

==== Episode 2 and 3: Teddy ====
- Mat Ranillo III as Teodoro "Teddy" Lozano – Brian & Ross's father – Ross and Brian's father who rejected his family but recently came back for Ross' wedding. Unfortunately, he died in a car accident and wanted to communicate with his family through Cristy.

==== Episode 4 and 5: Jenny ====
- Andre Tiangco as Raul Sandoval – Jenny's father who was trying to be strong after his only child's death.
- Yayo Aguila as Brenda Sandoval – Jenny's mother who still feels awful after her daughter's death.
- Angel Sy as Jenny – a ghost of a little girl who died of an illness. She stays in a hospital bed and can't move on unless she is able to talk to her parents.
- Francis Magundayao as Myrno "Boy" Alicante

==== Episode 6: Diane ====
- Dimples Romana as Dianne Gomez – she died of cancer and later found as a ghost that her husband is having an affair with her best friend. She then started to startle every woman who came near her husband including Cristy.
- Baron Geisler as Jeff Gomez – Dianne's husband. He loves his wife but admits that he had an affair with his wife's best friend.
- Ina Feleo as Aimee – Dianne's best friend who had an affair with Jeff.

==== Episode 7: Caloy ====
- James Blanco as Caloy Rueda – a ghost of a security guard who was murdered in the same building where Cristy works.
- LJ Moreno as Linda – the security guard's girlfriend whom he wants to warn that her new man is the one who killed Caloy.
- Ryan Eigenmann as Jimmy – Linda's new boyfriend, who actually killed Linda's former boyfriend, Caloy.

==== Episode 8 and 9: Sammy ====
- Nicole Uysiuseng as Levi
- Julia Montes as Maura
- John Manalo as Lino
- Joshua Dionisio as Perry
- Quintin Alianza as Sammy

==== Episode 10: James ====
- Coco Martin as James – the ghost of Leila's ex-boyfriend, he is a drug addict and thinks that the ghost of a guy named Edgardo is haunting him. He seeks help from Cristy after dying from an overdose of sleeping pills.
- Maja Salvador as Leila – James' ex-girlfriend. She was supposed to leave for Canada but after finding out that James died, she changed her mind.
- Joross Gamboa as Edgardo – the man who Leila and James accidentally killed after drunk driving. He was haunting James when he was alive, forcing him to resort to using pills which led to his overdose.
- Nikki Bacolod as Sarah – Edgardo's wife, she received a letter from James before he died.
- Carlo Aquino as Randolf – friend of James and Leila.

==== Episode 11: The Real Gabriel ====
- Piolo Pascual as Gabriel Montero – the mysterious man who is connected to Maruja's life. It was later revealed that he was the man Maruja was running away with and not Ross' past self.
- Jairus Aquino as Young Gabriel
- Alexa Ilacad as Young Maruja
- Melissa Mendez as Maruja's mother

==== Episode 12: Romualdo ====
- Dante Rivero as Old Gabriel (present time)

== Movies ==
1967 original movie cast

- Susan Roces as Maruja Isabel Sevilla Y Vira/Cristy Rivera
- Romeo Vasquez as Gabriel
- Eddie Garcia as Rodrigo
- Luis Gonzales as Rosanno Gabriel
- Nello Nayo as Don Igmindo
- Mary Walter as Doña Concha
- Caridad Sanchez as Petra
- Etang Discher
- Perla Bautista
- Dely Villanueva
- Andres Centenera
- Paquito Salcedo
- Felisa Salcedo
- Jay Ilagan
- Angel Confiado

1978 Movie remake cast

- Susan Roces as Maruja Isabella Sevilla/Nina Concepcion
- Phillip Salvador as Marco Lorenzo/Rodrigo De Velasquez
- Mario O' Hara as Freddie
- Laurice Guillen as Cristy
- Joel Torre as Joel
- Manny Ojeda as Señor Juan Miguel
- Mary Walter as Señora Agida
- Ronnie Lazaro as Vergel
- Peque Gallaga

1996 Movie remake cast

- Carmina Villarroel as Maruja Isabel Sevilla/Nina Concepcion
- Rustom Padilla as Marco Lorenzo
- Eric Quizon
- Albert Martinez
- Jaclyn Jose

== See also ==
- List of Komiks episodes
