= Flash Bomba =

- Flash Bomba by Mars Ravelo

Publication information
- Publisher: Klasiks Magazine
- Created by: Mars Ravelo

In-story information
- Full name: Paul Lester Sison
- Species: Human
- Place of origin: Philippines
- Abilities: Superhuman; strength, stamina; Thunderclaps; Enhanced combat mastery; Wallcrawling; Summoning of devil horses on a stampede; Hands and feet enlargement

Flash Bomba is a comic book superhero created by Filipino graphic novelist Mars Ravelo.

== Fictional character biography ==
Paul Lester Sison AKA Flash Bomba was a man who lost the use of his legs in an accident. Because of this, he trained the rest of his body to an incredible level of athletic ability and did everyday stuff using his hands to compensate for the loss of his ability to walk. Eventually, he heard a rumour about a "Tikbalang" (a mythological creature with the body of a man and the head of a horse) who would grant powers to anyone who could defeat it in battle. Flash Bomba challenged the Tikbalang and set a time and place for the battle. He defeated it despite his physical limitations and the Tikbalang granted him superpowers. But as a jest, the Tikbalang gave him powers that made him look awkward. Flash Bomba was given the Tikbalang's magic hair, said talisman (Filipino: agimat or anting-anting) allowing him to transform into his super-powered version - a being with large hands and feet, as well as superhuman powers. Using his new abilities, he became a crimefighter.

== Powers and abilities ==
Flash Bomba has superhuman strength, the ability to walk up walls, to generate "thunderclaps" using his large hands or block almost anything with same. In spite of his enlarged extremities, Flash Bomba is not in the least clumsy, and is a skilled unarmed fighter. He can also mystically summon "devil horses" to create a stampede.

== In other media ==
=== Television ===
Mars Ravelo's Flash Bomba 2009 TV series

The 2009 television series Komiks Presents: Flash Bomba stars Luis Manzano. Reno Maniquis redid the logo and modernized the costumes.

Flash Bomba also stars Roxanne Guinoo, Sid Lucero, Lito Pimentel, Nanette Inventor, Alan Paule, Rio Locsin, and Empoy Marquez.

==== Isang Lakas ====
Flash Bomba was part of the "Isang Lakas" team composed of past Komiks Presents heroes such as Varga, Tiny Tony and Kapitan Boom. The Isang Lakas crew is a superhero group conceptualized by ABS-CBN inspired by America's Avengers and Justice League.

== Collected editions ==
Title	Volume	Issue	Date
Flash Bomba	Tagalog Klasiks (1967-1968)	#440	November 17, 1967
Flash Bomba	Tagalog Klasiks (1967-1968)	#444	January 22, 1968
Flash Bomba	Tagalog Klasiks (1967-1968)	#454	June 10, 1968

== See also ==
- Isang Lakas
- List of Filipino superheroes
