= Komiks Presents: Tiny Tony =

2008 Philippine television fantasy drama series

- Also known as: Tiny Tony
- Genre: Fantasy
- Based on: Tiny Tony by Mars Ravelo
- Directed by: Dondon S. Santos
- Starring: John Prats
- Opening theme: "Elesi" by Rivermaya
- Country of origin: Philippines
- Original language: Filipino
- No. of episodes: 10

Production
- Production company: Dreamscape Entertainment Television

Original release
- Network: ABS-CBN
- Release: October 18 – December 13, 2008

Related
- Komiks Presents: Varga; Komiks Presents: Dragonna

Tiny Tony is a Philippine television drama fantasy series broadcast by ABS-CBN. This series is based on the comic strip at the same title by Mars Ravelo, the series is the fifth installment of Komiks. Directed by Dondon S. Santos, it stars John Prats. It aired on the network's Saturday evening line up from October 18 to December 13, 2008, replacing Komiks Presents: Varga and was replaced by Komiks Presents: Dragonna. The Ravelos commissioned Reno Maniquis some years back to re-design Captain Barbell, Flash Bomba and Tiny Tony's costumes for modern times.

== Plot ==
A science prodigy with mathematical aptitude, Tony (John Prats) is a nerd who dreams of making a difference in society. Tony is a simple guy who after a freak accident is transformed from a normal person to a tiny superhero. One day he meets an accident which literally causes him to become small. Will Tony ever return to his normal size? Or will he forever be Tiny Tony?

== Synopsis ==
Anthony “Tony” Aniscol (John Prats) was single-handedly raised by his Nanay Eden (Susan Africa). Because of his superior intelligence, Tony got his PhD at a young age and was taken in by scientist Dr. Morgan Peralta (Pen Medina) as a laboratory assistant. While Tony becomes friends with Dr. Morgan's daughter Michelle (Alex Gonzaga), he is despised by the doctor's son Joaquin (Coco Martin). After a laboratory accident kills Dr. Morgan, Tony finds himself shrunk to a mere six inches. While he struggles to get back to normal, Tony must face enemies like the Indian Warrior Red Cloud (Arron Villaflor) and the greedy Joaquin. Can Tony get himself out of trouble? Will he ever get back to his Nanay Eden and Michelle? How is the rich philanthropist-politician Gil Gante (Mura) connected to his predicament?

== Cast and characters ==
=== Main cast ===
- John Prats as Tiny Tony/Anthony “Tony” Aniscol
- Alex Gonzaga as Michelle Peralta - Joaquin's sister & ladylove of Tony

=== Supporting cast ===
- Arron Villaflor as Bryan De Jesus/Red Cloud - Tiny Indian Warrior
- Coco Martin as Joaquin Peralta - Michelle's brother
- Mura as Gil Gante
- Susan Africa as Eden - Tony's mother
- Gerard Acao as Jumbo Madrigal - friend of Tony & policeman
- Ama Quiambao as Lola Marge - Jumbo's grandmother

=== Special participation ===
- Pen Medina as Dr. Morgan Peralta - a scientist and Michelle & Joaquin's father
- Zaijian Jaranilla as young Tony
- Kristofer Martin as young Joaquin
- EJ Jallorina as Biboy
- CJ Navato as Waluigi
- Sharlene San Pedro as Celine
- Gee-Ann Abrahan as Mika
- Dianne Medina
- Gio Alvarez
- Richard Quan as Tony's father.

== See also ==
- Isang Lakas
- List of Komiks episodes
