= Komiks Presents: Kapitan Boom =

2008 Philippine television fantasy drama series

- Also known as: Kapitan Boom
- Genre: Fantasy
- Based on: Captain Boom by Mars Ravelo and Ric Ravelo
- Directed by: Frasco S. Mortiz; Dondon S. Santos
- Starring: Jon Avila; Maja Salvador; Jay-R Siaboc
- Theme music composer: Sugarfree
- Opening theme: "Hari ng Sablay" by Jay-R Siaboc
- Country of origin: Philippines
- Original language: Filipino
- No. of episodes: 15

Production
- Executive producers: Linggit Tan; Roldeo T. Endrinal
- Production companies: Dreamscape Entertainment Television; Classified Media

Original release
- Network: ABS-CBN
- Release: April 26 – August 2, 2008

Related
- Lastikman; Varga

Komiks Presents: Kapitan Boom (lit. 'captain boom') is a Philippine television drama fantasy series broadcast by ABS-CBN. This series is based on the comic strip Kapitan Boom by Mars Ravelo, the series is the third installment of Komiks. Directed by Frasco S. Mortiz and Dondon S. Santos, it stars Jon Avila, Maja Salvador and Jay-R Siaboc. It aired on the network's Saturday evening line up from April 26 to August 2, 2008, replacing 1 vs. 100 and was replaced by Komiks Presents: Varga.

== Plot ==
Lance Mercado has a secret superhero alter-ego: "Kapitan Boom". Lance's grandmother, Lola Gretchen (Gloria Sevilla), & his best friend, Bukol (Thou Reyes) are the only people who know about his abilities. During emergencies, Lance assumes another personality as Kapitan Boom (Jon Avila), the superhero dedicated to fighting the forces of evil.

Lance continues his normal life as a college student until he falls in love with a classmate, Melody (Maja Salvador). He struggles with his self-esteem issues to win her heart, but Melody already has her eyes set on Kapitan Boom. Melody eventually accepts Lance as a friend, but he may not be able to tell her that he is Kapitan Boom.

== Cast and characters ==
- Jay-R Siaboc as Lance Mercado (Kapitan Boom's alter-ego)
- Maja Salvador as Melody - Kapitan Boom's/Lance's girlfriend
- Jon Avila as Kapitan Boom
- Thou Reyes as Bukol - Lance/Kapitan Boom's best friend
- Mariana Del Rio as Cheska - Melody's cousin
- Isay Alvarez as Harmony -Melody's mother & Cheska's aunt
- Gloria Sevilla as Lola Gretchen - Lance/Kapitan Boom's grandma
- Ana Capri as Rebecca "Becky" Mercado - Lance/Kapitan Boom's mother
- Bembol Roco as Hector Dasmaquinoz
- Marvin Raymundo as Tristan Ballesteros - Hector's assistant
- Ina Raymundo as Queenie Romualdez - Hector's girlfriend
- Joem Bascon as Lapu-Lapu
- Jordan Castillo as Red
- Railey Valoroso as Ichiro - one of the Japanese soldiers & love interest of Lola Gretchen when she was young.
- Buboy Villar as Young Lance Mercado
- Maricar Reyes as Young Gretchen - love interest of Ichiro.
- Mariel Rodriguez as Varga - When Kapitan Boom meets her in his finale story & she begins her story

== Trivia ==
- Jay-R Siaboc sings the theme song for Kapitan Boom.
- Along with the weekly "Mars Ravelo's Komiks presents Kapitan Boom" of ABS-CBN, GMA also airs another Mars Ravelo daily classic telefantasya, "Dyesebel". These shows from Ravelo are broadcast for the first time in 2008.

== See also ==
- Isang Lakas
- List of Komiks episodes
