= Pepeng Agimat (TV series) =

2009 Philippine television fantasy drama series

- Genre: Action; Drama; Fantasy; Horror; Sword and sorcery
- Based on: Pepeng Agimat...Sa Daigdig ng Kababalaghan (1973) by Tony Cayado
- Developed by: Julie Anne R. Benitez; Roldeo T. Endrinal
- Written by: Philip King; Dindo Perez
- Directed by: Dondon S. Santos
- Starring: Jolo Revilla; Ramon "Bong" Revilla Jr.
- Country of origin: Philippines
- Original language: Filipino
- No. of episodes: 17

Production
- Executive producer: Arnel T. Nacario
- Cinematography: David Siat
- Running time: 45 minutes
- Production company: Dreamscape Entertainment Television

Original release
- Network: ABS-CBN
- Release: November 14, 2009 – February 27, 2010

Related
- Tiagong Akyat; Tonyong Bayawak; Juan dela Cruz

Agimat: Ang Mga Alamat ni Ramon Revilla presents Pepeng Agimat, more popularly known as simply Pepeng Agimat (lit. 'Pepe the Amulet') is a Philippine television drama fantasy series broadcast by ABS-CBN. This series is based on the 1973 Philippine film Pepeng Agimat...Sa Daigdig ng Kababalaghan, the series is the second installment of Agimat: Ang Mga Alamat ni Ramon Revilla. Directed by Dondon S. Santos, it stars Bong Revilla and Jolo Revilla. It aired on the network's Yes Weekend! line up from November 14, 2009 to February 27, 2010, replacing Agimat: Ang Mga Alamat ni Ramon Revilla: Tiagong Akyat and was replaced by Agimat: Ang Mga Alamat ni Ramon Revilla: Tonyong Bayawak.

== Overview ==
=== 1973 film ===
Agimat: Ang mga Alamat ni Ramon Revilla presents Pepeng Agimat is a TV adaptation of a film entitled Pepeng Agimat...Sa Daigdig ng Kababalaghan ("Pepe the Amulet...in the World of Mystery"), a 1973 film which starred Ramon Revilla Sr. as the title role Pepeng Agimat. It also starred Gloria Romero, Rosemarie Gil, and Bella Flores. The film was directed by Tony Cayado.

=== 1999 film ===
Pepeng Agimat
- Screenplay by: Felix E. Dalay; Jojo Lapus
- Produced by: Jojo Lapus
- Starring: Bong Revilla; Dennis Padilla; Princess Punzalan
- Music by: Jaime Fabregas
- Release date: December 25, 1999
- Running time: 116 minutes
- Country: Philippines
- Languages: English; Tagalog

The 1973 film has also been remade in 1999. It starred Bong Revilla, son of the lead actor of the original film Ramon Revilla Sr. who also participated to a cameo on the film as Apo Damon. The film also starred by Princess Punzalan who had just portrayed her signature role as Selina Matias in the movie of Mula sa Puso, Jess Lapid Jr., Al Tantay, Vanessa del Bianco, LJ Moreno, Dennis Padilla, King Gutierrez and Bong Revilla Jr.'s son Jolo Revilla who apparently is going to take the title role for the television remake of the film.

== Synopsis ==
The second chapter in the Agimat: Ang mga Alamat ni Ramon Revilla series, Jolo Revilla plays the title role of Pepeng Agimat. Bullied in school for being the geeky and clumsy student, Pepe will discover that there is a mission he has inherited from his father that he must fulfill. He will be passed a magical amulet which he must use in vanquishing the clan of the aswang that is terrorizing Cavite. But when Pepe falls for the beautiful and mysterious lady named Lora, he will be forced to choose between his mission and his love for her.

== Cast ==
=== Main cast ===
- Jolo Revilla as Felipe "Pepe" Dimaanta, Jr.
- Bong Revilla as Felipe "Pepe" Dimaanta, Sr.
- Ai-Ai delas Alas as Gloring Dimaanta
- Melissa Ricks as Lora Hizon
- Ping Medina as Lucio Hizon
- Jay-R Siaboc as Benjie Quizon
- Lou Veloso as Tata Endo
- Tess Antonio as Thelma
- Shamaine Buencamino as Elena Hizon
- Helga Krapf as Sheila Romualdez
- Josef Elizalde as Ryan Guerzon
- Izzy Canillo as Pepito Dimaanta

=== Special Participation ===
- Emilio Garcia as Amang Aswang
- Ana Capri as Victoria/Ynang Mananaggal
- Empress Schuck as Helen San Simarin
- Bernard Palanca as Romulo
- Roxanne Guinoo as Myra

== Award ==
- 2010 PMPC Star Awards for Television's "Best Horror/Fantasy Program"

== See also ==
- Agimat: Ang Mga Alamat ni Ramon Revilla
