= Tiagong Akyat (TV series) =

- Based on: Hulihin si Tiagong Akyat (1973) by Armando A. Herrera
- Directed by: Dondon S. Santos
- Starring: Gerald Anderson; Erich Gonzales
- Country of origin: Philippines
- Original language: Filipino
- No. of episodes: 13

Production
- Executive producer: Brenda Lee Estocapio
- Running time: 45 minutes
- Production companies: Dreamscape Entertainment Television; Classified Media

Original release
- Network: ABS-CBN
- Release: August 15 – November 7, 2009

Agimat: Ang Mga Alamat ni Ramon Revilla Sr. Presents Tiagong Akyat, more popularly known as simply Tiagong Akyat (lit. 'Tiago the Climber') is a Philippine television drama fantasy series broadcast by ABS-CBN. This series is based on the 1973 Philippine film Hulihin si Tiagong Akyat, the series is the first installment of Agimat: Ang Mga Alamat ni Ramon Revilla. Director by Dondon S. Santos, it stars Gerald Anderson and Erich Gonzales. It aired on the network's Yes Weekend! line up from August 15, 2009 to November 7, 2009, replacing Komiks: Nasaan Ka Maruja? and was replaced by Agimat: Ang Mga Alamat ni Ramon Revilla: Pepeng Agimat.

== Overview ==
=== 1973 film ===
Agimat: Ang mga Alamat ni Ramon Revilla Sr. presents Tiagong Akyat is a TV adaptation of a film entitled Huhulihin si... Tiagong Akyat ("Arrest Tiagong Akyat"), a 1973 film which gave Ramon Revilla Sr. a FAMAS Best Actor trophy. "Tiagong Akyat" was the alias of Santiago Ronquillo, a notorious thief who looted homes in Manila and nearby provinces in the 1920s.

=== Synopsis ===
The story follows the life of unconventional hero Santiago Ronquillo. Tiago is a streetwise orphan who, after acquiring the amulet known as the Pangil ng Kidlat ("Fang of Lightning"), gains superhuman strength, speed and the ability to climb high walls that enhances his parkour abilities. He then uses his gift to steal from the corrupt to help the poor.

== Plot ==
After many years, Tiago (Gerald Anderson) meets Cornelia (Erich Gonzales) and gets a chance to profess his love for her. Cornelia's suitor Vincent becomes jealous of Tiago. Meanwhile, Cornelia's father Mayor Mariano is against his daughter's relationship with the impoverished Tiago. Cornelia decides to elope with Tiago and they plan to get married. One night, Cornelia tells Tiago that her father wants to meet him. Tiago goes to Mayor Mariano's house where he found him bloody and unconscious. Vincent arrives and tells the guards to arrest Tiago. After killing Mayor Mariano, Vincent frames Tiago for the murder. The court finds Tiago guilty and sentences him to life imprisonment. In jail, Tiago befriends Big Max, Nardo, and Pablo. After learning that Cornelia had married Vincent, Tiago makes several attempts to escape but miserably fails. Years pass and Tiago discovers that the urban legend about the amulet called Pangil ng Kidlat is true when he meets Castro, the owner of the amulet.

Castro gives his amulet to Tiago, and before dying, he asks the young man to use the amulet to prove his innocence. Tiago, together with his newfound friends inside the prison, then successfully escape. Tiago intends to force Vincent to admit the truth. Cornelia hears from Vincent that he did murder Mayor Mariano, Cornelia's father. Tiago and Vincent struggle for the gun, and they accidentally shoot Cornelia. Before dying, Cornelia tells Tiago that she loves him, and that they have a son named Martin. Vincent tells the police and Martin that it was Tiago who killed Cornelia. With the help of his fellow fugitive, Tiago takes his son from Vincent. Nardo goes to the house of his sister Norma, and there Tiago tries to convince his son that he is a good man. Norma is worried that Tiago will only bring trouble, but she eventually understands his desire to win his son. She befriends Martin and helps the boy trust his own father. Tiago lets Martin hear the voice recording wherein Vincent admitted it was he who murdered Mayor Mariano.

Vincent asks Red's help in finding Tiago and getting Martin, and Red promises to use his influence. Meanwhile, Tiago and his friends decide to help their poor neighbors by stealing from the wealthy and the corrupt. Just then, Red chases Tiago and shoots Tiago at the back hitting his heart but he survived because of his amulet, his fellow members learn about this, they ask Tiago and Tiago admits that it's because of his Agimat. Max then tells Pablo to steal the amulet but he gets caught by Tiago while they were asleep, then Max shoots Pablo dead. Vincent finally surrenders and gives back Martin to Tiago, as Police arrest Vincent, Max shows up and fires at Vincent. Tiago now was revealed to be innocent, he marries Norma and they celebrate.

Max then burns down a house, causing the people to panic and try to put out the fire. They then search for Martin, who was then abducted by Max, Tiago chases after him and he finds him cornered in the warehouse. Max convinces Tiago to give him the amulet and he will give Martin to him. Tiago surrenders the amulet with Martin running to Tiago's side. Tiago passes his amulet to Martin with Max shooting Tiago and a fightout ensues, ending with Tiago being shot again. Martin then returns to see Tiago lying dead. After the incident, Tiago is buried in a cemetery where his family and neighbors visit him.

== Cast ==
=== Main cast ===
- Gerald Anderson as Santiago Ronquillo
- Erich Gonzales as Cornelia Verde
- Jason Abalos as Vincent Fajardo
- Maxene Eigenmann as Norma Muñoz Ronquillo
- Ryan Eigenmann as Big Max
- Jayson Gainza as Father Baste
- Danilo Barrios as Nardo Muñoz
- Joseph Bitangcol as Pablo Reyes
- Carlo Guevarra as Buboy Arnaiz
- Arron Villaflor as Jigo Manuson
- Nova Villa as Aling Marta
- Daniel Fernando as Red Capulong
- Bugoy Cariño as Martin Mariano Ronquillo
- Eric Nicolas as PE/MSgt. Mercado

=== Special participation ===
- Bing Davao as Mariano Verde
- Pen Medina as Castro "Kastrong Bato" Manangkil
- Neil Ryan Sese as Albert "Abet" Ronquillo
- Elaine Quemuel as Anabel Ronquillo
- Francis Magundayao as Teen Tiago
- Cheska Billiones as teen Cornelia
- Basty Alcanses as teen Buboy
- Carlo Lacana as teen Vincent
- Andrei Garcia as teen Jigo
- Joshua Dionisio as teen Baste
- Mikee Lee as Badong

== See also ==
- Agimat: Ang Mga Alamat ni Ramon Revilla
