= Tonyong Bayawak =

2010 Philippine television fantasy drama series

- Genre: Action; Fantasy; Thriller
- Based on: Tonyong Bayawak (1979) by Jose Yandoc
- Written by: Honey Hidalgo; Dindo Perez; Shugo Praico
- Directed by: Jon Red; Dondon S. Santos
- Starring: Coco Martin
- Country of origin: Philippines
- Original language: Filipino
- No. of episodes: 13

Production
- Executive producer: Emilio E. Siojo
- Running time: 45 minutes
- Production companies: Dreamscape Entertainment Television; CCM Creatives

Original release
- Network: ABS-CBN
- Release: March 6 – May 29, 2010

Related
- Pepeng Agimat; Elias Paniki

Tonyong Bayawak (lit. 'Tonyo the Water monitor') is a Philippine television drama fantasy series broadcast by ABS-CBN. This series is based on the 1979 Philippine film at the same title, the series is the third installment of Agimat: Ang Mga Alamat ni Ramon Revilla. Director by Jon Red and Dondon S. Santos, it stars Coco Martin. It aired on the network's Yes Weekend! line up from March 6, 2010 to May 29, 2010, replacing Agimat: Ang Mga Alamat ni Ramon Revilla: Pepeng Agimat and was replaced by Agimat: Ang Mga Alamat ni Ramon Revilla: Elias Paniki.

== Overview ==
=== 1979 film ===
Agimat: Ang mga Alamat ni Ramon Revilla presents Tonyong Bayawak is a TV adaptation of the 1979 film Tonyong Bayawak ("Tonyo the Lizard") which starred Ramon Revilla Sr. as the titular Tonyong Bayawak. In the film, Tonyo gains invincibility after killing a golden wild boar in the forest which also rendered him cursed, as his head transforms into that of a wild boar whenever he gets enraged.

It also starred Boots Anson-Roa, Rosemarie Gil, and Paquito Diaz. The film was directed by Jose Yandoc.

== Plot ==
Tonyo Dela Cruz (Coco Martin) is a responsible father who hunts monitor lizards for a living. One night, he was out hunting when he saw a band of men sexually assaulting a woman. He tries his best to save the woman, and the woman manages to escape but Tonyo gets stabbed to death by the assailants. They then dispose of Tonyo's body in the river, thinking he was already dead. Just then, a fairy appeared and granted a privilege to Tonyo that changed his life forever - the fairy chose him to take possession of the Agimat (amulet). The trinket took the form of a belt buckle that gives him the abilities and instincts of a monitor lizard (bayawak), transforming his arms into a reptilian's and granting him superhuman abilities. He then takes revenge on the men by slaughtering them one-by-one.

Tonyo's wife Maring was assaulted by the same syndicate Tonyo encountered in the forest, she was sexually assaulted by the leader and her skull accidentally crushed. Tonyo, after finding out about this, gets enraged and tries his best to track down the syndicate responsible for his wife's death.

== Cast ==
=== Main ===
- Coco Martin as Antonio "Tonyo" Dela Cruz/Tonyong Bayawak
- Nikki Gil as Angie Inocencio
- Alessandra De Rossi as Mary Ann "Maring" Dela Cruz
- Krista Ranillo as PO1 (Patrolwoman) Katrina Veles

=== Supporting ===
- Eric Fructuoso as Brandon Inocencio
- Jhong Hilario as Nitoy
- Bing Loyzaga as Sandra Inocencio
- Dick Israel as P/Insp. (P/Capt.) Rodrigo
- Tessie Tomas as Belen Dela Cruz
- Maricar Reyes as Diwata Alvara
- Ram Revilla as Jeff
- John James Uy as Gino
- Randolph Stamatelaky as Teodore "Totti" Inocencio
- Yshikiel Jacinto as Onay Dela Cruz

== Reruns ==
Reruns of the show's episodes aired on Jeepney TV in March 2018 as part of the spotlight on Coco Martin as JTV Icon of the Month.

== See also ==
- Agimat: Ang Mga Alamat ni Ramon Revilla
