= Komiks Presents: Dragonna =

2008–09 Philippine television fantasy drama series

- Title card
- Also known as: Dragonna
- Genre: Superhero
- Created by: ABS-CBN Studios
- Directed by: Don Don Santos
- Starring: Shaina Magdayao; Alessandra De Rossi; Jake Cuenca
- Opening theme: "Umiinit, Umaapoy, Lumiliyab" by Panky Trinidad
- Country of origin: Philippines
- Original language: Filipino
- No. of episodes: 9

Original release
- Network: ABS-CBN
- Release: December 20, 2008 – February 7, 2009

Related
- Komiks Presents: Tiny Tony; Komiks Presents: Flash Bomba

Dragonna is a Philippine television drama fantasy series broadcast by ABS-CBN. This series is based on the comic strip at the same title by Mars Ravelo, the series is the sixth installment of Komiks. Directed by Dondon S. Santos, it stars Shaina Magdayao, Alessandra De Rossi and Jake Cuenca. It aired on the network's Yes Weekend line up from December 20, 2008 to February 7, 2009, replacing Komiks Presents: Tiny Tony and was Komiks Presents: Flash Bomba. The series is about a teenage girl who discovers that she has pyrokinetic abilities and decides to use this newly found ability for a greater good. She releases this ability every time she loses her temper.

Two superheroes meet as the heroine Dragonna bids goodbye in her last fight and the bombastic Flash Bomba begins his adventure.

== Synopsis ==
Tomboyish Olive (Shaina Magdayao) comes from a race of Tagon or Taong Dragon with a blood of a dragon thru her family. Olive will discover that she has the power to create fire. Olive dons her costume: Dragonna. Rona's real name is Olive and acquired her own identity to transform into a female taong dragon. Can Edgar actually carry out his plan without falling in love with the feisty girl but will he fall in love with Rona?

The three firemen namely Narcisso (Bayani Agbayani), Elmo (Long Mejia) and Junior (Arnold Reyes) will discover that water will prevent Rona's "hot" temper because of the argument that Rona and Edgar (Jake Cuenca) got into. Olive/Rona turned into a superheroine called; "Dragonna", to meet up with her brother Rafael.

== Cast and characters ==
=== Main cast ===
- Shaina Magdayao as Olive / Rona / Dragonna - a pretty teenager who has the power to create fire.
  - Mika dela Cruz as young Rona
- Alessandra De Rossi as Alice - Edgar’s mean girlfriend who harbors a deep jealousy over Rona.
  - Patricia Gayod as young Alice
- Jake Cuenca as Edgar - a star basketball player who will capture the heart of Rona.
  - Francis Magundayao as young Edgar

=== Supporting cast ===
- Carlos Agassi as Rafael - a thief whose dark identity holds the key to Rona’s past.
  - Carlo Lacana as young Rafael
- Eda Nolan as Ella - Rona’s bubbly and supportive best friend.
  - Alexa Ilacad as young Ella
- Bayani Agbayani as Narcisso a.k.a. Tatay Ngit - the strictest among the three firemen foster fathers of Rona.
- Long Mejia as Elmo a.k.a. Tatay Hiks - a fireman and foster father of Rona who is sick with asthma.
- Arnold Reyes as Junior a.k.a. Tatay Naks - the most lenient among of Rona’s three foster fathers.

=== Special participation ===
- Jodi Sta. Maria as Theresa - Mother of Olive turned into a female dragon
- Neil Ryan Sese as Arthur -Olive's Father
- Cacai Bautista as Ling
- Lovely Rivero as Ingrid
- Dominic Ochoa as Bugoy
- Joross Gamboa as Migo

== See also ==
- Isang Lakas
- List of Komiks episodes
