= Komiks Presents: Varga =

2008 Philippine television fantasy drama series

- Also known as: Varga
- Genre: Superhero; Fantasy
- Written by: Joel Mercardo; Danica Domingo
- Directed by: Trina N. Dayrit; Dondon S. Santos
- Starring: Mariel Rodriguez; Angel Sy
- Country of origin: Philippines
- Original language: Filipino
- No. of episodes: 10

Production
- Production companies: Dreamscape Entertainment Television; Classified Media

Original release
- Network: ABS-CBN
- Release: August 9 – October 11, 2008

Related
- Kapitan Boom; Tiny Tony

Varga is a Philippine television drama fantasy series broadcast by ABS-CBN. The series is the fourth installment of Komiks. Directed by Trina N. Dayrit and Dondon S. Santos, it stars Mariel Rodriguez and Angel Sy. It aired on the network's Saturday evening line up from August 9 to October 11, 2008, replacing Komiks Presents: Kapitan Boom and was replaced by Komiks Presents: Tiny Tony.

Varga is an alien princess ghost who finds herself drawn to planet Earth. Gifted with beauty, superpowers and a voluptuous body, she meets a young girl named Olga, and together transform into the hero Varga, where they defeat evil and save the world.

== Origin ==
Mars Ravelo created the character in 1947, when working in Bulaklak Magazine. He created the character believing that Filipinos were in need of a superhero, after World War II. Ravelo left the magazine two years later, leaving the character behind. He joined Pilipino Komiks in 1949, then he decided to reconstruct the character, turning Varga into Darna.

== Synopsis ==
Princess Vara is from Planet Vargon, home to a race of powerful beings from outer space. Due to the destruction of her home planet, Vara is saved and lands on Earth, however, she only exists in ghost form. On Earth, she meets a young human girl name Olga, who is the only one who can see her, due to her kind heart. Under Olga's influence, Vara falls in love with the people of Earth.

These two women's destiny are meant to be merged - literally. Upon a shout and a touch, the violet-colored ghost Vara unites with the human child Olga, fused into one person in a single body: the superheroine Varga. Together, Vara and Olga begin their journey to become a real hero, and to defeat earth's enemy, Xandra - an evil woman who preys on the youth and beauty of others to stay young and beautiful.

== Cast ==
Main cast

- Mariel Rodriguez as Vara/Varga - A princess from Planet Vargon. She landed on Earth when her planet exploded.
- Angel Sy as Olga - A young girl who loves to dance, Olga is the only person who can see Vara.
- Sheryl Cruz as Xandra - An 80-year-old crone becomes a 21-year-old ladylike villainess. She was once a woman scorned by the love of a man who rejected her for a younger woman. Because of this, she is constantly looking for the "fountain of youth". In the meantime, she protects her youth and beauty by draining the youth of others. She will do anything to find the "fountain of youth", that will keep her young forever. Xandra says she is James' sister, but in actuality, she is James' grandmother.
- Zanjoe Marudo as James - A playboy model for his "sister's" perfume line. James is completely different from his sister, Xandra. He falls in love with Vara/Varga.

Supporting cast

- Dominic Ochoa as Andres - He is Olga's father. Andres was accused of stealing. Trying to hide from the authorities, Andres finds himself in a creepy laboratory.
- Dexter Doria as Tita Perla - Olga's aunt. Perla is business-minded. She specializes in illegal gambling in her house. In spite of the poor treatment she gives to Olga, she still sees family above money.
- Kiray Celis as Cherry Lou - A rich teen beauty queen in her town. She and her nanny pay the beauty contest judges in exchange for winning the contest.
- Roldan Aquino as Mang Toning - A guy working along with Olga's father in the construction site. He will serve as Olga's surrogate father after her biological one perishes.
- Jojit Lorenzo as Bogard - Xandra's personal and laboratory assistant to make her (Xandra) feel young despite having an old age.
- Hyubs Azarcon as Inspt. Peter San Jose - The policeman who is sent to investigate the natural death of Olga's father.
- Paul Salas as Brian - Olga's friend and brother of Cherry Lou
- Pretty Trishia as Candy - James' personal handler and talent manager
- Marnie Lapus as Yaya Precy - Cherry Lou's Yaya
- John Prats as Tiny Tony - Seen in the finale, when Varga's story was ended & his own story begins.

== See also ==
- Isang Lakas
- List of Komiks episodes
