= Joaquin Burdado =

1988 Filipino fantasy action film

- Directed by: Carlo J. Caparas
- Written by: Carlo J. Caparas
- Starring: Ramon Revilla; Tanya Gomez; Janice Jurado; Deborah Sun; Paquito Diaz; Rocco Montalban
- Cinematography: Ramon Marcelino
- Edited by: Rene Tala
- Production company: Golden Lion Films
- Release date: May 19, 1988
- Country: Philippines
- Language: Filipino

Joaquin Burdado is a 1988 Filipino fantasy action film written and directed by comic book writer Carlo J. Caparas and starring Ramon Revilla as the titular character, alongside Tanya Gomez, Janice Jurado, Deborah Sun, Paquito Diaz and Rocco Montalban. Produced by Caparas' Golden Lion Films, it was released on May 19, 1988.

Critic Lav Diaz gave Joaquin Burdado a negative review, criticizing the film's dialogue, costume design, lighting, sound design, the performances of the supporting cast and the silly ("kenkoy") climactic fight scene, though he singled out praise for the animation of tattoos coming to life.

== Cast ==
- Ramon Revilla as Joaquin Burdado
- Tanya Gomez
- Janice Jurado
- Deborah Sun
- Paquito Diaz
- Rocco Montalban
- Renato del Prado
- Johnny Vicar
- Danny Riel
- Danny Labra
- Sanny Erang
- Gwen Colmenares
- Angelo Villegas
- Fred Moro
- Elvis Gutierrez

== Release ==
Joaquin Burdado was released on May 19, 1988.

=== Critical response ===
Lav Diaz, writing for the Manila Standard, gave the film a negative review. Though he found the action scenes and the animation of Joaquin's tattoos coming to life to be good, he criticized the film's dialogue, lighting, costume design, sound design and the supporting cast's performances. Diaz also questioned why Joaquin's escape from prison did not make the authorities look for him throughout the rest of the film, and further criticized the climactic action scene between Joaquin and the villain to be silly ("kenkoy").

== Television remake ==
In 2008, a television remake titled Joaquin Bordado was broadcast on GMA, with Robin Padilla as the titular character.
