= List of Komiks episodes =

The following is a list of episodes from the Filipino TV series Komiks, which airs on Saturday evenings on the ABS-CBN network in the Philippines.

The first season of the series presented 12 distinct stories over the course of 13 episodes. One of the stories (Agua Bendita) had two parts.

The second season likewise had 12 distinct stories but had 15 episodes, because three of the stories (Inday sa Balitaw, Bampy, and Si Pardina at mga Duwende) had two parts each.

The third and fourth season of Komiks breaks from the pattern of the first two seasons, with the entire season devoted to a single story, Da Adventures of Pedro Penduko. Matt Evans of PBB Teen Edition stars in the title role. Matt Evans once again occupied the fifth season of Komiks, with a whole new adventure and characters. It is dubbed as Si Pedro Penduko at ang mga Engkantao.

After the much successful airing of "Pedro Penduko" series, Komiks was shelved for a while to give way for 1 vs. 100. In April 2008, Komiks resumed airing for sixth season with the collection of Mars Ravelo's works, with Kapitan Boom as its initial offering. This was followed by Varga, Tiny Tony and Dragonna. Nasaan Ka Maruja? was the only Ravelo's masterpiece air for non-superheroes stories.

== Episodes ==
Mega Manila ratings are published by AGB Philippines in Abante Tonite.

=== Season 1 ===
Title	Creator	Original airdate	Season	Episode #	Mega Manila rating
Inday Bote	Pablo S. Gomez	February 4, 2006	1-1	1	29.9%
Inday Bote	Inday (Judy Ann Santos) is a tomboyish young lady who lives with his younger brother Onyong (Aaron Junatas). Inday and Onyong's father died and they are now left in the company of their bad and ugly stepmom Tiya Fara and stepsister Sara. Inday and Onyong work together in the streets pushing cart collecting and peddling old used bottles. Inday is in love with the pesky but charming balut vendor, Greg (Ryan Agoncillo) whom Inday's stepsister Sara pursues. Unknown to Inday and Onyong there are seven dwarves trapped by the dwarf Queen inside the bottle. What follows are series of riotous twists and turns as each dwarf casts a spell in an effort to make Inday open the bottle.				
Blusang Itim	Elena M. Patron	February 11, 2006	1-2	2	27.2%
Blusang Itim	An ugly girl named Jessa (Cassandra Ponti) found an old blouse which possesses the power to make her beautiful. She uses it to make Angelo (Marco Alcaraz), the man of her dreams, fall for her. But Melchor (Uma Khouny), her childhood friend, professed his undying love for the ugly Jessa. Jessa is now torn between men she loves.				
Vincent	Rod Santiago	February 18, 2006	1-3	3	21.4%
Vincent	Rica Peralejo and Bernard Palanca team up to bring together the popular comic book story "Vincent" where a murdered man seeks justice in the form of his car.				
Starboy	Vic J. Poblete	February 25, 2006	1-4	4	24.6%
Starboy	Boy and Gary (John Prats) are identical twins who get separated from one another when they were still babies. When Boy turned 17, a meteor fell in their backyard. The sparks of the meteor affected him in a good way: his polio was cured, and he was able to acquire super-strength, and super-speed plus the ability to fly—making him StarBoy! And the complications began and the action became even more intense when he saved his twin brother Garry who suddenly disappeared without a trace.				
Agua Bendita (Part 1)	Rod Santiago	March 4, 2006 (Re-aired April 5, 2007)	1-5	5	23.6%
Agua Bendita (Part 1)	In this episode of Komiks, we learn the story of twins Agua and Bendita with Agua as a water-like baby. Shaina Magdayao plays the title role, with Rayver Cruz as her love interest.				
Agua Bendita (Part 2)	Rod Santiago	March 11, 2006 (Re-aired April 6, 2007)	1-6	6	24.7%
Agua Bendita (Part 2)	The story of the popular Liwayway comic continues. There is a case of mistaken identity as Agua gets evil twin Bendita to pretend to be "Agua" for cover.				
Machete	Pablo S. Gomez	March 18, 2006	1-7	7	20.8%
Machete	Mara (Sandara Park) accidentally broke the shop's mannequin so she replaced it with Machete's statue. The statue of Machete (Joseph Bitangcol), carved by his late wife Alindog, comes alive at night and tries to win Mara's heart. Machete believed that Mara is Alindog but Mara tried to convince him otherwise. In the end Mara met Marky, a reincarnation of Machete.				
Kamay ni Hilda	Pablo S. Gomez	March 25, 2006	1-8	8	19.8%
Kamay ni Hilda	Toyang (Melanie Marquez) who was killed by the man who fathered her child made a promise to her new born Hilda (Bea Alonzo) that every time she is in danger, her hands would protect her. Hilda's hands transform into monstrous hands whenever danger comes her way. It is only when her father's blood come into contact with her hands that the curse would stop.				
Paa ni Isabella	Rod Santiago	April 1, 2006	1-9	9	22.1%
Paa ni Isabella	Two reporters who were ex-lovers, Tina (Toni Gonzaga) and John (Luis Manzano) battle it out to get an exclusive story about a killer/monster who lives in an old mansion. Tina with her gay cameraman, Dexter (Chokoleit), went to the story first, But John did not let her so they finally agreed to share the story. They discovered that Kuliling (DJ Durano) impregnated Isabela (Jenny Miller), the wife of Dr. Regidor, and owner of the mansion. In order to provide food for the baby, Isabella's elastic hideous feet stretches to drain life from its victim. When Isabella's baby was about to birth, Isabella's feet must kill one's life and it was John's life, but Tina, Dexter and John had going to escape when the monster baby was born. Order to kill the zombies, Tina raised her Cross necklace including Isabella. When they escape, they didn't know that the Kuliling had join them home. On the end of the story, A garbage man get the monster baby but it looks like a cute normal baby but when the garbage man took it home, it was already a monster baby.				
Mamayang Hatinggabi	Elena M. Patron	April 8, 2006	1-10	10	20.3%
Mamayang Hatinggabi	Loy (Geoff Eigenmann) went hunting in the woods when he met Beba (Anne Curtis), a beautiful girl who saved his life when he fell a ravine. He went searching for Beba for months until he found a mansion in the middle of the forest wherein Beba and his vampire family lived. When Loy and Beba fell in love, the battle of mortals versus vampires began.				
Sandok ni Boninay	Rod Santiago	April 22, 2006 (Re-aired April 7, 2007)	1-11	11	22.4%
Sandok ni Boninay	An orphaned girl named Boninay (Sharlene San Pedro) was gifted with a magic sandok by a fairy. She was adopted by a couple named Ogie (Archie Alemania) and Ethel (Mickey Ferriols) who owns an eatery. Ethels' eatery competed with a much bigger eatery owned by Señora Factora (Malou de Guzman) just across the street. Boninay tried to help by making Ethel's cooking smell and taste delicious thus enticing customers to come to her eatery. Señora Factora decided to get even, and the war of magic started between good and evil.				
Si Piolo at si Lorelei	R.R. Marcelino	April 29, 2006	1-12	12	17.6%
Si Piolo at si Lorelei	Piolo (Piolo Pascual) a grandma's boy, was saved from drowning by Lorelei (Angelica Panganiban), a mermaid when they were just kids. They again crossed paths when Piolo was attacked by Diana (Cacai), a girl who ordered to have him killed because he wasn't interested in her. She again rescued Piolo from drowning and they fell in love. Pugita (Eugene Domingo), Lorelei's guardian, tried to get in the way but their love overpowered Pugita's fury.				
Bunsong Kerubin	Pablo S. Gomez	May 5, 2006	1-13	13	16.8%
Bunsong Kerubin	In the season finale of Komiks, Angel Sy stars as Bunsong Kerubin, an angel who is helped by her friends protect the earth!				

=== Season 2 ===
Title	Creator	Original airdate	Season	Episode #	Mega Manila rating
Inday Sa Balitaw (Part 1)	Pablo S. Gomez	May 13, 2006	2-1	14	21.5%
Inday Sa Balitaw (Part 1)	Judy Ann Santos returns to open Komiks' second season. She stars as Inday, a poor woman who has been left in the care of her mother's cousin. In order to pay off some debts, Inday's fake mother sends her off to a mansion as a maid.				
Inday Sa Balitaw (Part 2)	Pablo S. Gomez	May 20, 2006	2-2	15	17.9%
Inday Sa Balitaw (Part 2)	The adventures of Inday continue as Inday's real mother returns. Will things work out for the best for the mother and daughter?				
Lightning Roda	Vic J. Poblete	May 27, 2006	2-3	16	12.8%
Lightning Roda	Angelika dela Cruz takes on the role of popular Philippine comic book superhero Lightning Roda. Nancy Castiliogne stars as Roda's opponent and Dominic Ochoa is Roda's love interest.				
Kapitan Aksiyon	Rod Santiago	June 3, 2006	2-4	17	12.4%
Kapitan Aksiyon	Alfred Vargas saves the day as Kapitan Aksiyon, a popular superhero. Nikki Gil also stars.				
Vulcan 5	Rod Santiago	June 10, 2006	2-5	18	14.3%
Vulcan 5	Superhero fever continues on Komiks as several of the Goin' Bulilit kids bring to life the story of the comic book superhero team Vulcan 5! Find out about their origins, powers and opponents here!				
Bampy (Part 1)	Elena M. Patron	June 17, 2006	2-6	19	14.3%
Bampy (Part 1)	In a Star Magic 14th Anniversary special, the stars of Star Magic come together for the story of Bampy, a child who has been stolen by vampires and is being trained to become a vampire. Things become interesting when Bampy's parents re-appear on the surface.				
Bampy (Part 2)	Elena M. Patron	June 24, 2006	2-7	20	13.7%
Bampy (Part 2)	The story of Bampy continues in the second part of the Star Magic special. Now that Bampy's parents are back, can she be stopped from becoming a vampire child?				
Momay	Elena M. Patron	July 1, 2006	2-8	21	18.9%
Momay	Momay (Maja Salvador) and Andro (Patrick Garcia) met one day in a cafe. It was love at first sight for both. That same day, Momay got into an accident and died. Andro, a romance novelist, checked in a bed and breakfast place in Tagaytay to write. There he met Mommy Ana who was Momay's adoptive mother. Momay's ghost began to show herself to Andro. She even tried to take over dying and weak bodies in order for her to follow Andro. But that kind of love could never work. Momay decided to move on to the next life and Andro promised her that he'll love no other. That they'll meet again in the afterlife.				
Si Pardina at mga Duwende (Part 1)	Jim M. Fernandez	July 8, 2006	2-9	22	20.3%
Si Pardina at mga Duwende (Part 1)	Mikylla Ramirez portrays Pardina. She is a girl who meets dwarfs and she treated the dwarfs as her friends.				
Si Pardina at mga Duwende (Part 2)	Jim M. Fernandez	July 15, 2006	2-10	23	15.6%
Si Pardina at mga Duwende (Part 2)	Pardina continues her adventures with her dwarf friends.				
Alpha Omega Girl	Flor Afable Olazo	July 29, 2006	2-11	24	15.4%
Alpha Omega Girl	Alpha Omega Girl is played by Anne Curtis and her love interest is played by Zanjoe Marudo.				
Valentina	Zoila	August 5, 2006	2-12	25	20.0%
Valentina	Jodi Sta. Maria-Lacson plays a good Valentina. AJ Dee also stars as Valentina's love interest.				
Bahay ng Lagim	Pablo S. Gomez	August 12, 2006	2-13	26	18.3%
Bahay ng Lagim	Diether Ocampo and Kristine Hermosa stars in this scary thriller episode.				
Cleopakwak	R. R. Marcelino	August 19, 2006	2-14	27	19.2%
Cleopakwak	This episode is about a duck or Itik who lays golden egg to help a guy, who has a kind heart. This stars reel partners, Joross Gamboa and Roxanne Guinoo.				
Fun Haus	Vic J. Poblete	September 2, 2006	2-15	28	15.6%
Fun Haus	Fun Haus can be best described as the Filipino version of The Chocolate Factory, but in a sacry-thriller way. Rustom Padilla stars as the Ring Master. And Zanjoe Marudo tries to find a way to stop the Ring Master to doing evil things.				

=== Seasons 3 and 4: Francisco V. Coching's Da Adventures of Pedro Penduko ===
The third and fourth seasons of Komiks are devoted to a single story, entitled Francisco V. Coching's Da Adventures of Pedro Penduko, with Matt Evans of PBB Teen Edition fame in the title role.

Pedro is a simple boy who is thrust into the world of superstition and mythical creatures. The oft-taunted klutz of his class embarks on a special voyage accompanied by his special 'helpers', and finds his self-confidence increasing as he passes each challenge in his quest to save his father.

Title	Original airdate	Season	Episode #	Mega Manila rating
Episode 1: Bungisngis	September 9, 2006	3-1	29	25.7%
Episode 1: Bungisngis	Pedro Penduko is a person who likes to make-up stories and tell it to other people. And he doesn't know that his stories will soon become a reality. Pedro is destined to become a savior and a great warrior. In this episode, Pedro fought a Bungisngis.			
Episode 2: Lambana	September 16, 2006	3-2	30	21.8%
Episode 2: Lambana	Pedro succeeded overcoming all the challenges that he face him in his quest to save Floreshka.			
Episode 3: Kapre	September 23, 2006	3-3	31	24.8%
Episode 3: Kapre	After receiving powers, Pedro is now ready to fight off the mighty Kapre.			
Episode 4: Manananggal	September 30, 2006	3-4	32	no ratings was shown
Episode 4: Manananggal	After defeating the Kapre, Pedro falls prey to the seductive charms of a girl, who turns out to be a Manananggal . He uses the red stone to make him strong enough to defeat the Manananggal.			
Episode 5: Aswang	October 7, 2006	3-5	33	20.9%
Episode 5: Aswang	Pedro's good friend turns out to be his deadly nemesis, the Aswang.			
Episode 6: Mambabarang	October 14, 2006	3-6	34	19.1%
Episode 6: Mambabarang	Pedro succeeded defeating the Mambabarang.			
Episode 7: Sigben	October 21, 2006	3-7	35	22.9%
Episode 7: Sigben	Pedro defeats the Sigben at the same time he professes his love for Hiyas. He also entered Dalakit, where he finds and saves the king of Floreshka and not his father.At the same time he also found out that Hiyas was lying to him.			
Episode 8: Dalaketnon	October 28, 2006	3-8	36	24.5%
Episode 8: Dalaketnon	Pedro and his father, Juan saw each other again they both escaped from the dalaket. The father and son tandem defeated the dalaketnons. While Hari Haddi and Prinsesa Hiyas got back to Floreshka safe. When Pedro and Juan got back home to Tulay-Buhangin, they found out that Lola Maria is sick.			
Episode 9: Nuno Sa Punso	November 4, 2006	3-9	37	23.6%
Episode 9: Nuno Sa Punso	After Pedro & Juan found out that Lola Maria is sick, their first suspect is Nuno Sa Punso, but it wasn't them. So they went to Floreshka to get help from Pantas. They found out that Kasimiro, one of the Dalaketnons, made Lola Maria sick. Juan and Pedro both tried to find ways to cure it. The only cure is to capture the santelmo.			
Episode 10: Tiyanak	November 11, 2006	3-10	38	22.9%
Episode 10: Tiyanak	Find out if Pedro will beat the Tiyanak.			
Episode 11: Tiktik	November 18, 2006	3-11	39	24.5%
Episode 11: Tiktik	Pedro encounters the elusive long-tongued Tiktik.			
Episode 12: Pugot	November 25, 2006	3-12	40	21.6%
Episode 12: Pugot	The townspeople of San Jose get haunted by a Pugot.			
Episode 13: Tikbalang	December 2, 2006	3-13	41	23.2%
Episode 13: Tikbalang	Pedro learns how to control the wild and playful Tikbalang.			
Episode 14: Santelmo	December 9, 2006	3-14	42	21.7%
Episode 14: Santelmo	Pedro finally finds the cure for his grandmother.			
Episode 15: Bangungot	December 16, 2006	3-15	43	16%
Episode 15: Bangungot	Pedro enters Racquel's dream to save her from the Bangungot monster.			
Episode 16: Amalanhig	December 23, 2006	3-16	44	19.5%
Episode 16: Amalanhig	Pedro defeated the undying vampire-like Amalanhig.			
Episode 17: Agta	December 30, 2006	4-1	45	21.3%
Episode 17: Agta	This episode is the start of another season of Pedro Penduko, so Budong (of Super Inggo) joins Pedro with his adventure to defeat the Agta.			
Episode 18: Alan	January 6, 2007	4-2	46	21.5%
Episode 18: Alan	Merrydith (Maja Salvador) joins Pedro's hunt for the Alan to revenge her fallen siblings.			
Episode 19: Wak-Wak	January 13, 2007	4-3	47	21.1%
Episode 19: Wak-Wak	Pedro defeated the flying aswang,Wak-Wak.			
Episode 20: Berberoka	January 20, 2007	4-4	48	23.1%
Episode 20: Berberoka	Pedro learns of Father Ben's death after falling victim to the Berberoka.			
Episode 21: Bal-Bal	January 27, 2007	4-5	49	20.0%
Episode 21: Bal-Bal	Bukang Liwayway defends Hiyas to the throne.			
Episode 22: Kataw	February 3, 2007	4-6	50	20.1%
Episode 22: Kataw	Kadyo regains consciousness in the hands of his former mermaid lover, Casili.			
Episode 23: Siyokoy	February 10, 2007	4-7	51	20.8%
Episode 23: Siyokoy	Pedro found out that his real mother is Bukang Liwayway and Hadi seeks the help of Bakul to look for Bukang Liwayway, who was taken by a big wave.			
Episode 24: Minokawa	February 17, 2007	4-8	52	21.6%
Episode 24: Minokawa	Bukang Liwayway discovers Pantas' involvement in her abduction.			
Episode 25: Busaws	February 24, 2007	4-9	53	19.7%
Episode 25: Busaws	Juan and Pedro confronts the "Busaws".			
Episode 26: Sirena	March 3, 2007	4-10	54	23.6%
Episode 26: Sirena	Pedro finally gets reunited with his mother, Bukang Liwayway.			
Episode 27	March 10, 2007	4-11	55	20.5%
Episode 27	Kafra, Kadyo and Casili helps Pedro, Juan and Bukang Liwayway to escape from Kalalawdan.			
Episode 28	March 17, 2007	4-12	56	20.4%
Episode 28	Pantas revenges to the Penduko family.			
Episode 29: Ikugan	March 24, 2007	4-13	57	18.4%
Episode 29: Ikugan	After Juan's death, Pedro reminisces all the moments he spent with his father.			
Episode 30: Inlablabbuot	March 31, 2007	4-14	58	17.7%
Episode 30: Inlablabbuot	The shape-shifter Inlablabbuot gains Pedro's trust and leads him to a trap.			
Episode 31: Saranggay	April 7, 2007	4-15	59	##%
Episode 31: Saranggay	Coming Soon.			

=== Season 5: Pedro Penduko at ang mga Engkantao ===
Its ratings started with a 20.2% Mega Manila Ratings beating its rival show with 17%.

Title	Original airdate	Season	Episode #	Mega Manila rating
Episode 1: Amalanhig	September 9, 2006	3-1	29	25.7%
Episode 1: Amalanhig	Pedro Penduko starts a new life in the city.			
Episode 2: Alan	September 16, 2006	3-2	30	21.8%
Episode 2: Alan	Pedro met the old man who knows about the danger coming			
Episode 3: Bal-Bal	September 23, 2006	3-3	31	24.8%
Episode 3: Bal-Bal	Pedro's quest began to find the six chosen people.			
Episode 4: Mambabarang	September 30, 2006	3-4	32	no ratings was shown
Episode 4: Mambabarang	Hiyas has been attacked by a jealous ex-beauty queen.			
Episode 5: Manananggal	October 7, 2006	3-5	33	20.9%
Episode 5: Manananggal	A male manananggal attacks the Wet Market.			
Episode 6: Mambabarang	October 14, 2006	3-6	34	19.1%
Episode 6: Mambabarang	Pedro succeeded defeating the Mambabarang.			
Episode 7: Berberoka	October 21, 2006	3-7	35	22.9%
Episode 7: Berberoka	A teenage girl attacks people and start sucking all the water for the city.			
Episode 8: Aswang	October 28, 2006	3-8	36	24.5%
Episode 8: Aswang	An aswang callboy attacks gay people who tries to buy him.			
Episode 9: Siyokoy	November 4, 2006	3-9	37	23.6%
Episode 9: Siyokoy	A water-creature attacksthe townspeople			
Episode 10: Nuno sa Punso	November 11, 2006	3-10	38	22.9%
Episode 10: Nuno sa Punso	A teenage guy fell in love with Marie but tries to imprison her with him forever			
Episode 11: Pugot	November 18, 2006	3-11	39	24.5%
Episode 11: Pugot	Pedro encounters the elusive long-tongued Tiktik.			
Episode 12: Sigben	November 25, 2006	3-12	40	21.6%
Episode 12: Sigben	A grown-up sigben tried to make Moy part of the family.			
Episode 13: Ikugan	December 2, 2006	3-13	41	23.2%
Episode 13: Ikugan	A bullied by teacher Japanese boy, shows his secret and attacks his teacher			
Episode 14: Santelmo	December 9, 2006	3-14	42	21.7%
Episode 14: Santelmo	Moy found out her friend Monique has the same power as him, but much powerful.			
Episode 15: Tiyanak	December 16, 2006	3-15	43	16%
Episode 15: Tiyanak	A monster-baby attack hospital.			
Episode 16: Tiktik	December 23, 2006	3-16	44	19.5%
Episode 16: Tiktik	A flying monster attack people in the streets			
Episode 17: Saranggay	December 30, 2006	4-1	45	21.3%
Episode 17: Saranggay	A mistaken person attack those people who put him in jail.			
Episode 18: Agta	January 6, 2007	4-2	46	21.5%
Episode 18: Agta	A mental patient tried to kill people just to bring back his beloved woman.			
Episode 19: Lambana	January 13, 2007	4-3	47	21.1%
Episode 19: Lambana	The danger becomes more fragile, Earthquakes and typhoon are coming.			
Episode 20: Dalaketnon	January 20, 2007	4-4	48	23.1%
Episode 20: Dalaketnon	The six chosen ones stopped the evil Kalagua from destroying the world.			
Episode 21: Bal-Bal	January 27, 2007	4-5	49	20.0%
Episode 21: Bal-Bal	Kalagua has chosen her three allies to ruin the world.			
Episode 22: the End	February 3, 2007	4-6	50	20.1%

== Other episodes ==
=== Replay episodes ===
- Inday Bote
- Kamay ni Hilda
- Piolo at Lorelei

=== Holy Week: Replayed Episodes ===
- Agua Bendita (Part 1) (April 5, 2007 - Maundy Thursday)
- Agua Bendita (Part 2) (April 6, 2007 - Good Friday)
- Sandok ni Boninay (April 7, 2007 - Black Saturday)

=== Unaired episodes ===
- Zoila's Super Gee (Judy Ann Santos)
- Pablo S. Gomez's Babaeng Pusa (Aubrey Miles and Troy Montero)
- Isang Lakas

== See also ==
- Komiks
- List of programs aired by ABS-CBN
