= Elias Paniki =

2010 Philippine television fantasy drama series

- Created by: Carlo J. Caparas
- Based on: Ang Mahiwagang Daigdig ni Elias Paniki by Carlo J. Caparas
- Developed by: Julie Anne R. Benitez; Roldeo T. Endrinal
- Written by: Dindo Perez; Shugo Praico
- Directed by: Claudio "Tots" Sanchez-Mariscal IV
- Starring: Jake Cuenca
- Opening theme: "Puso" by Sponge Cola
- Country of origin: Philippines
- Original language: Filipino
- No. of episodes: 13

Production
- Executive producer: Arnel T. Nacario
- Running time: 45 minutes
- Production companies: Dreamscape Entertainment Television; Classified Media; Cinemedia

Original release
- Network: ABS-CBN
- Release: June 5 – August 28, 2010

Related
- Tonyong Bayawak; Bianong Bulag; Hiwaga ng Kambat

Agimat: Ang Mga Alamat ni Ramon Revilla presents Elias Paniki, more popularly known as simply Elias Paniki (lit. 'Elias the Bat') is a Philippine television drama fantasy series broadcast by ABS-CBN. This series is based on the 1989 Philippine film Ang Mahiwagang Daigdig ni Elias Paniki, the series is the fourth installment of Agimat: Ang Mga Alamat ni Ramon Revilla. Director by Claudio "Tots" Sanchez-Mariscal IV, it stars Jake Cuenca. It aired on the network's Yes Weekend! line up from June 5, 2010, to August 28, 2010, replacing Agimat: Ang Mga Alamat ni Ramon Revilla: Tonyong Bayawak and was replaced by Wansapanataym.

== Overview ==
=== Original film ===
Agimat: Ang mga Alamat ni Ramon Revilla presents Elias Paniki is a TV adaptation of a film entitled Ang Mahiwagang Daigdig ni Elias Paniki ("The Enchanting World of Elias the Bat"), a film which starred Ramon Revilla Sr. as the title role.

== Story content ==
Armando was the father of Elias. Elias' mother died the night she gave birth to Elias to live with his foster parents. Elias takes mixed martial arts: Muay Thai training by a soldier named Victor, is given an amulet with extraordinary powers, the "bertud ng paniki." He uses the amulet to fight off the wicked witches and warlocks (mangkukulam) are immortal, ageless, and undying, who is feared to have returned.

== Cast ==
=== Main cast ===
- Jake Cuenca as Elias/Armando
- Sam Pinto as Amanda
- Kelly Misa as Raya
- Xian Lim as Gabriel
- Hermes Bautista as Migs
- Baron Geisler as Alexander
- Cherry Pie Picache as Maria
- Jojit Lorenzo as Nando
- Cheska Billones as Sandy
- Jerry O' Hara as Narcing

=== Guest cast ===
- Ronnie Lazaro as Victor
- Jairus Aquino as Young Elias
- Kath Mendoza as Young Amanda
- Adrianna Agcaoili as Eliza

== See also ==
- Agimat: Ang Mga Alamat ni Ramon Revilla
