= Ram Revilla =

Filipino actor (1988–2011)

- Born: Ramgen Jose Magsaysay Bautista; February 12, 1988; Pasay, Philippines
- Died: October 29, 2011 (aged 23); Parañaque, Philippines
- Cause of death: Murder
- Resting place: Angelus Eternal Garden, Imus, Cavite
- Other names: Ramboy Revilla, Ramgen Revilla
- Occupations: Matinee idol, actor, model
- Years active: 2004–2011
- Parents: Jose Bautista; Genelyn Magsaysay
- Website: ramrevilla.net

Ram Revilla (Tagalog pronunciation: [rɛˈbiljɐ]; February 12, 1988 – October 29, 2011), born Ramgen Jose Magsaysay Bautista and also known as Ramgen Revilla, was a Filipino actor best known for his roles in various Filipino television series including his role as Jeff Gatdula in Tonyong Bayawak. Revilla was murdered on October 28, 2011. He was declared dead on arrival at the Parañaque Medical Center after being shot and stabbed at his home. There is no clear evidence of who killed him.

== Personal life ==
Revilla was born in Pasay to actor and former Philippine Senator Jose A. Bautista (Ramon Revilla, Sr.) and Genelyn Magsaysay. His name "Ramgen" is derived from the first names of his father and mother, Ramon and Genelyn. He grew up in Imus, Cavite. He is one of nine children of Revilla, Sr. to Magsaysay and also a half-brother of actor Ramon "Bong" Revilla, Jr. He followed his father's and brother's footsteps, landing roles on television when he was just 14 years old.

== Filmography ==
=== Film ===
Year	Title	Role	Notes
2004	Anak Ka ng Tatay Mo	-	First movie appearance
2005	Exodus: Tales from the Enchanted Kingdom	Tenyente ng Bantayan	Credited as Ramboy Revilla
2007	Resiklo	Council 3	Credited as Ramgen Revilla/Last movie appearance

=== Television ===
Year	Title	Role	Note
2007–08	Kamandag	Harn	Recurring Role/First TV appearance
2010	Agimat: Ang Mga Alamat ni Ramon Revilla: Tonyong Bayawak	Jeff Gatdula	Recurring Role/Last TV appearance

== Death ==
Revilla was murdered by an unidentified assailant in his family residence at BF Homes in Parañaque City on October 28, 2011, with his younger sister Ma. Ramona Belen (Mara) and girlfriend Janelle Manahan present in the crime scene. He sustained 11 stab wounds on his body and a gunshot to the right side of his chest. Manahan suffered two gunshots on her face and shoulder, and Ramona was left uninjured. Citing a police report, Sen. Revilla, brother of the victim, said the gunman shot Ram Revilla with a .45 caliber gun and then stabbed him. Manahan survived the injuries she sustained.

=== Wake and burial ===
October 29, 2011, the first day of Revilla's wake, was attended by members of his family, friends, and fans. President Benigno Aquino III expressed his condolences through the presidential deputy spokesperson Abigail Valte but did not attend the wake. A mass was held in the last night of his wake on November 1, 2011. His remains were buried on November 2, 2011, at the Revilla Mausoleum at Angelus Eternal Garden in Imus, Cavite, with his family and closest friends leading the funeral rites. His sister Ramona was outside the country during the wake and burial.
