= John James Uy =

Filipino model-actor

- Born: September 13, 1987 (age 38); Mountain View, California, United States
- Occupations: Actor, Artist, Host, Model
- Years active: 2007–present
- Agents: Star Magic; Viva Artists Agency

John James Uy (Note: John James Uy was born in the United States of America. Thus, he does not possess his mother's maiden name which is de Guzman.) (born September 13, 1987) is a Filipino-American artist, host and model.

== Biography ==
John James Uy was born on September 13, 1987, in Mountain View California. In 2007, he won the 2nd runner-up in the Be Bench / The Model Search. A year after, he was picked to do hosting jobs for myx North America/Myx International. In the same year, he starred in his first regular TV stint in Pieta.

== Filmography ==
=== Film ===
Year	Title	Role
2012	Rigodon	Riki
2014	Trophy Wife	Johnboy
2016	The Escort	

=== Television ===
Year	Title	Role	Notes
2007	Be Bench / The Model Search	Himself	
2007	Love Spell: Cindy-rella	Prince William	
2008	Pieta	Frank	
2008	ASAP	Himself	
2008	myx North America	VJ John/host	
2009	Midnight DJ	Boyet	Pedicab
2009	Your Song: Gaano Kita Kamahal	Ferds	
2009	Tayong Dalawa	Edward	
2009	The Wedding	Sam	Guest, 1 episode
2009	George and Cecil	Dr. Meneses	Guest, 1 episode
2010	Everybody Hapi	Duane Dy	Guest, 1 episode
2010	Your Song: Love Me, Love You	Kyle	
2010	Agimat: Ang Mga Alamat ni Ramon Revilla: Tonyong Bayawak	Gino	
2010	Precious Hearts Romances Presents: Kristine Series	Guest actor	
2011	Your Song Presents: Kim	Pierre	
2011	Reputasyon	Randy Villamayor	
2012	Miss World Philippines 2012	Co-anchor	
2014	Wattpad Presents: His Secretary	Dale	
