= Bondying =

- Bondying in his 1953 comic book debut in Pilipino Komiks

Publication information
- Publisher: Pilipino Komiks
- First appearance: August 29, 1953
- Created by: Mars Ravelo

Bondying is a comic book character created by Filipino graphic novelist Mars Ravelo and first introduced by Pilipino Komiks on August 29, 1953. He is a large person who is still considered a baby.

== Character history ==
=== Films ===
- In 1954, Fred Montilla played Bondying in the first film adaptation of the same title. After the film became a hit, a sequel titled Tatay Na si Bondying was released in 1955.
- In 1973, actor Jay Ilagan played the role in Ato ti Bondying.
- In 1989, Viva Films released Mars Ravelo's Bondying: The Little Big Boy. The title role of Bondying was performed by comedian Jimmy Santos, although the film later ends with the title character officially maturing for his age. Mars Ravelo's Bondying: The Little Big Boy was a box office hit in the Philippines.

=== Television ===
Bondying is portrayed by actor Jimmy Santos in the 1989 television production, Bondying: The Little Big Boy.

== Collected editions ==
Title	Volume	Issue	Date
Bondying	Pilipinas Komiks	#1	
Bondying	Pilipinas Komiks	#161	August 1, 1953
Bondying	Pilipinas Komiks	#162	August 15, 1953
Bondying	Pilipinas Komiks	#194	November 6, 1954

== See also ==
- Barok
