= Jon Avila =

Filipino actor

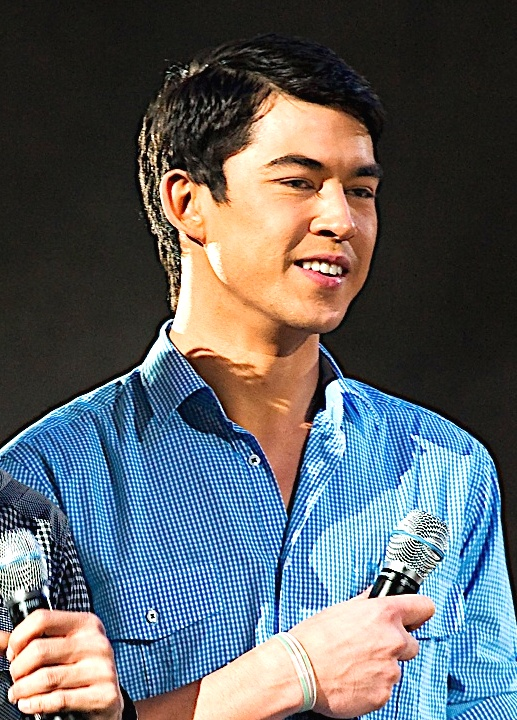
- Avila at the Star Magic Concert Tour in Ontario, June 2009
- Born: Jonathan Mullally (Note: Jon Avila was born in London, England. Thus, he does not possess his mother's maiden name.); 1 September 1985 (age 41); London, England
- Occupations: Actor, model, host
- Years active: 2007–2011
- Agent: Star Magic (2007–2011)

Jon Avila (born Jonathan Mullally; 1 September 1985) is a former Filipino-Irish actor, model and ex-housemate of Pinoy Big Brother: Celebrity Edition 2.

== Filmography ==
=== Film ===
Year	Title	Role	Notes	Source
2007	Nars	Liam		
2008	One Night Only	Pons		
2008	When Love Begins	Wally		
2009	Status: Single	Iñaki		
2009	OMG (Oh, My Girl!)	Bambam Baderos		
2010	Paano Na Kaya	Anton		
2010	Ang Tanging Ina Mo (Last na 'To!)	Frank		
2011	Bulong	Dr. Randy		
2011	Pak! Pak! My Dr. Kwak!	Marcus		
2011	Enteng ng Ina Mo	Frank		

=== Television ===
Year	Title	Role	Notes	Source
2007	Pinoy Big Brother: Celebrity Edition 2	Himself - Housemate	Forced eviction (Day 81)	
2007–2010	ASAP Rocks	Himself - Host / Performer		
2008	Komiks Presents: Kapitan Boom	Kapitan Boom		
2008	Maging Sino Ka Man: Ang Pagbabalik	Mark		
2008–10	Shall We Dance?	Himself - Host		
2009	I Love Betty La Fea	Carlo		
2009	Midnight DJ	Bullet	Episode: "Traje de Boda"	
2009	Showtime	Himself - Judge		
2009	Everybody Hapi	Jordan		
2010	Maynila	Jacob Javier	Episode: "Reachable Star"	
2010	Rubi	Saul		
2010	Precious Hearts Romances Presents: Impostor	Julio Cabrera		
2010	P.O.5	Himself - Host / Performer		
2010	1DOL	Jude		
2010	Wansapanataym	Edward Salameda	Episode: "Inday Bote"	
2011	Laugh Out Loud	Himself	"Celeb Photobooth" prank	
2011	Mga Nagbabagang Bulaklak	Boris Delgado		
2011	I Dare You	Himself - Challenger		
