= Pain to Power =

Studio album by Maruja
- Released: 12 September 2025
- Length: 50:17
- Label: Music for Nations
- Producer: Samuel W Jones

Maruja chronology
Tir na nÓg (2025)	Pain to Power (2025)

Singles from Pain to Power
- 1. "Break the Tension" Released: 3 October 2024; 2. "Look Down on Us" Released: 8 May 2025; 3. "Saoirse" Released: 10 July 2025; 4. "Trenches" Released: 29 August 2025

Pain to Power is the debut studio album by the English rock band Maruja. It was released on 12 September 2025 through Music for Nations. Produced by Samuel W Jones, the album was preceded by the singles, "Break the Tension", "Look Down on Us", "Saoirse" and "Trenches".

Released to critical acclaim, the album reached number eleven on the UK Vinyl Albums Chart, thirteen on the UK Physical Albums Chart and number forty-eight on the Scottish Albums Chart.

== Release ==
On 9 May 2025, Maruja officially announced their debut album and released the lead single "Look Down On Us". The band also announced a tour for the album spanning across the United States and Europe. Additionally, the album was to include "Break the Tension", a single released by the band on 3 October 2024. The next single, "Saoirse", alongside its music video, was released on 10 July 2025. A fourth single, "Trenches", was released on 29 August. Pain to Power was officially released on 12 September 2025, through Music for Nations.

== Critical reception ==
Professional ratings
Aggregate scores
Source	Rating
Metacritic	81/100
Review scores
Source	Rating
Clash	8/10
Kerrang!	5/5 stars
God Is in the TV	10/10
Paste	9/10
Pitchfork	6.9/10

Pain to Power received critical acclaim upon its release. Matt Mitchell, writing for Paste, dubbed the album "a feral and loving atmosphere calling attention to world crises". Olly Thomas of Kerrang! further hailed it as "one of the year's most important records".

== Track listing ==
All lyrics are written by Harry Wilkinson; all music is composed by Wilkinson, Matt Buonaccorsi, Joe Carroll, and Jacob Hayes.

Pain to Power track listing
No.	Title	Length
1.	"Bloodsport"	3:43
2.	"Look Down on Us"	9:58
3.	"Saoirse"	5:14
4.	"Born to Die"	10:04
5.	"Break the Tension"	3:45
6.	"Trenches"	3:33
7.	"Zaytoun"	4:20
8.	"Reconcile"	9:40
Total length:		50:17

== Personnel ==
Credits adapted from Tidal.

=== Maruja ===
- Harry Wilkinson – lead vocals, guitar
- Joe Carroll – saxophone, background vocals on "Reconcile"
- Matt Buonaccorsi – bass guitar, background vocals on "Reconcile"
- Jacob Hayes – drums, percussion, background vocals on "Reconcile"

=== Additional contributors ===
- Samuel W Jones – production, mixing, engineering
- Katie Tavini – mastering
- Alan Keary – arrangement, strings, cello, viola, and violin on "Look Down on Us" and "Saoirse"

== Charts ==
Chart performance for Pain to Power
Chart (2025)	Peak position
French Rock & Metal Albums (SNEP)	65
Scottish Albums (OCC)	48
UK Albums Sales (OCC)	14
UK Rock & Metal Albums (OCC)	2
