= Jay-R Siaboc =

Filipino actor

- Born: Eduardo Siaboc Jr. January 21, 1987 (age 39); Manila, Philippines
- Other name: Jay-R
- Occupations: Actor; singer
- Years active: 2006–present
- Father: Eduardo Siaboc Sr.
- Musical career
- Origin: Toledo, Cebu, Philippines
- Genres: OPM; pinoy rock; pop rock
- Instrument: Vocals

Eduardo "Jay-R" Siaboc Jr. (born January 21, 1987) is a Filipino actor and singer. He competed in the reality talent show Pinoy Dream Academy season 1 (2006), where he finished as runner-up to Yeng Constantino.

== Early life ==
Eduardo Siaboc Jr. was born on January 21, 1987, where he was raised by his father Eduardo Siaboc Sr. The youngest of five siblings, Siaboc grew up having not much. He was forced to quit school to help out his parents. Siaboc lived in Manila with his uncle who introduced him to the band scene, however he was too young to work in a band and returned to Cebu. Siaboc pursued his dream and became the vocalist of Scrambled Eggs.

== Career ==
He first appeared on television on Your Song and then won the role of Jeffrey in the prime time TV series Pangarap na Bituin. He also starred in the action TV series entitled Palos portraying the role of Agent Enzo, together with Jake Cuenca.

He made quite a stir in the music scene leaving such memorable hits as "Hiling" and "May Tama Rin Ako" .

== Personal life ==
Siaboc has one daughter with his current partner Trisha May Varga. On July 13, 2016, Siaboc, together with his cousins went to the police authorities in his hometown in Toledo, Cebu to clear his name in the station's watchlist due to allegations that he was involved in illegal drugs, as opposed to earlier reports of "surrendering". Siaboc admitted that he was previously using illegal drugs, but denied the claim that he is selling them or dealing with illegal drug transactions.

== Filmography ==
=== Television ===
Year	Title	Role
2006	Pinoy Dream Academy	Scholar
2007–2014	ASAP	Himself
2007	Your Song: Cool Off	Allen
2007	Your Song: Minsan Lang	Angelo
2007	Pangarap na Bituin	Jeffrey Tuazon
2008	Sineserye Presents: Patayin sa Sindak si Barbara	Dale
2008	Palos	Enzo
2008	Komiks Presents: Kapitan Boom	Lance (Kapitan Boom's alter-ego)
2009	Kambal sa Uma	Paco
2009	Agimat: Ang Mga Alamat ni Ramon Revilla Presents: Pepeng Agimat	Benjie Quizon
2010	Maalaala Mo Kaya: Bag	Guest Actor
2010	Wansapanataym: Ali Badbad en da Madyik Banig	Sali Badbad
2011	Your Song: Kim	Guest Actor
2011	Agimat: Ang Mga Alamat ni Ramon Revilla: Kapitan Inggo	Jun–Jun Ramirez
2011	Imortal	Journalist Reporter
2015	It's Showtime	Guest Performer
2023	Battle of the Judges	Contestant

== Awards and nominations ==
Year	Award giving body	Category	Nominated work	Results
2008	Awit Awards	Best Regional Recording	"Maanyag Ka"	Nominated
2008	Awit Awards	Best Regional Recording	"Naglibog"	Nominated
