= Pugot =

Filipino mythical creature

- Gender: Male/female
- Region: Ilocos

Equivalents
- Ifugao: Tulud Nimputul

The Pugot ("decapitated one") is a mythical fiend that is found in the folklore of the Ilocos region of the Philippines. It can assume various shapes such as hogs, dogs or even as humans. However, it usually appears as a black, big headless being. The creature usually resides in dark places or deserted houses. However, they especially like living in trees such as the duhat (Eugenia cumini), santol (Sandoricum koetjape), and tamarind.

Aside from its shapeshifting abilities, the pugot can also move at great speeds, feeding on snakes and insects that it finds among the trees. It feeds by thrusting food through its neck stump.

Although frightening, the pugot is otherwise relatively harmless. However, the creature is fond of women's underwear and takes them while they are being dried on a clothesline.

The pugot is also found in the Ifugao myth "Tulud Nimputul: The Self-Beheaded" where he appears to the human hero. He was fed by the hero with chopped chicken meat that was mixed with blood.
