= Agimat: Ang Mga Alamat ni Ramon Revilla =

2009–11 Philippine television fantasy drama series

- Genre: Fantasy; Drama; Anthology
- Starring: varies by episode
- Country of origin: Philippines
- Original language: Filipino
- No. of episodes: 96

Production
- Running time: 45 minutes
- Production companies: Dreamscape Entertainment Television; CineMedia Group

Original release
- Network: ABS-CBN
- Release: August 15, 2009 – March 18, 2011

Agimat: Ang Mga Alamat ni Ramon Revilla (lit. 'Amulet: The Legends of Ramon Revilla') is a Philippine television drama fantasy anthologies series broadcast by ABS-CBN. The series is based on the films of Ramon Revilla Sr. It aired on the network's Yes Weekend and Hapontastic line up (now Kapamilya Gold) and worldwide on TFC from August 15, 2009 to March 18, 2011, replacing Komiks and was replaced by My Princess and Wansapanataym. Theures the Filipino cultural belief in the powers of an agimat or amulet. The milieu of the characters and stories are primarily set in Cavite province where the belief in amulets remains strong to this day.

The series comprised four titles: Tiagong Akyat is played by Gerald Anderson wherein he has superhuman strength, speed, and the ability to climb high walls through his amulet that makes him invincible; Tonyong Bayawak is played by Coco Martin and has the abilities and characteristics of the bayawak (monitor lizard); Elias Paniki is played by Jake Cuenca who has the quest to destroy all witches and warlocks; and Pepeng Agimat is played by Jolo Revilla, who fulfills the mission of killing the aswangs or vampires.

During the second season, it had now transformed into an afternoon mini-series as part of the Hapontastic block, now Kapamilya Gold. The second season comprised two titles: Bianong Bulag is played by Jason Abalos a blind young man who gets a hold of an amulet that makes him a deadly sharpshooter, a special power he uses to help those in need; and Kapitan Inggo is played again by Jolo Revilla which has the power to ward off bullets and conquer his enemies.

Installments that did not push through were Pepeng Kuryente and Boy Putik, which were supposed to star Ejay Falcon and Enchong Dee, respectively.

== Season 1 ==
=== Tiagong Akyat ===
Air-date	August 15, 2009 - November 7, 2009
English Title	Tiago the Climber or Climbing Tiago; based on a true story of Santiago "Tiagong Akyat" Ronquillo.
Synopsis	Tiagong Akyat was one of the most famous outlaws in Philippine history. He terrorized Manila and the nearby provinces in the 1920s, looting homes and establishments. There was a legend that he only looted the homes of the rich and even helped the poor. Such was his notoriety that rarely had a newspaper been issued in any day without any news about him.
Director	Dondon S. Santos
Cast	Gerald Anderson, Erich Gonzales, Jason Abalos, Joseph Bitangcol, Carlo Guevarra, Arron Villaflor, Jason Gainza, Max Eigenmann, Daniel Fernando, Danilo Barrios, Ryan Eigenmann, Mikee Lee, Pen Medina, and Nova Villa.

=== Pepeng Agimat ===
Air-date	November 14, 2009 – February 27, 2010
English Title	Pepe the Amulet / Charmed Pepe
Synopsis	Bullied in school for being the geeky and clumsy student, Pepe discovers that there is a mission he has inherited from his father that he must fulfill. He has been given a magical amulet which he must use in vanquishing the clan of the aswang that is terrorizing Cavite. But when Pepe falls for the beautiful and mysterious lady named Lora, he is forced to choose between his mission and his love for her.
Director	Dondon S. Santos
Cast	Jolo Revilla, Ai-Ai delas Alas, Melissa Ricks, Ping Medina, Jay-R Siaboc, Lou Veloso, Helga Krapf, Josef Elizalde, Tess Antonio and Ramon "Bong" Revilla Jr.
Award	2010 PMPC Star Awards for Television's "Best Horror/Fantasy Program"

=== Tonyong Bayawak ===
Air-date	March 6, 2010 – May 29, 2010
English Title	Tonyo the Lizard; more specifically Water monitor
Synopsis	Antonio "Tonyo" Dela Cruz (Coco Martin), a responsible father who hunts monitor lizards for a living has been chosen by a fairy of the forest to battle injustice and to restore peace in Cavite under the guise of Tonyong Bayawak. But the death of his wife Maring leads him to cross the thin line between hero and vigilante.
Director	Dondon S. Santos
Cast	Coco Martin, Nikki Gil, Alessandra de Rossi, Krista Ranillo, Eric Fructuoso, Jhong Hilario, Dick Israel, Tessie Tomas, Bing Loyzaga, Maricar Reyes, Ram Revilla, John James Uy, Randolph Stamatelaky, Yshikiel Jacinto

=== Elias Paniki ===
Air-date	June 5, 2010 – August 28, 2010
English Title	Elias the Bat
Synopsis	Elias' mother died the night she gave birth to Elias to live with his foster parents. Elias takes mixed martial arts: Muay Thai training by a soldier named Victor, and is given an amulet with extraordinary powers, the "bertud ng paniki." He uses the amulet to fight off the mangkukulam who is feared to have returned.
Director	Tots Sanchez Mariscal IV
Cast	Jake Cuenca, Sam Pinto, Xian Lim, Kelly Misa, Hermes Bautista, Baron Geisler, Jojit Lorenzo, Cherry Pie Picache

== Season 2 ==
=== Bianong Bulag ===
Air-date	January 24, 2011 – February 4, 2011
English Title	Biano the Blind
Synopsis	A blind young man gets hold of an amulet that makes him a deadly sharpshooter—-a special power he uses to help those in need.
Director	Dondon S. Santos
Cast	Jason Abalos, Jessy Mendiola, Joem Bascon, Charee Pineda, Arron Villaflor, Dominic Ochoa, Agot Isidro, Emilio Garcia, Gardo Versoza, Michael Roy Jornales, Nash Aguas, Joshua Sayarot

=== Kapitan Inggo ===
Air-date	February 7, 2011 – March 18, 2011
English Title	Captain Inggo
Synopsis	A young man becomes an invincible hero after he obtains an amulet which gives him the power to ward off bullets and conquer his enemies.
Director	Malu L. Sevilla, Darnel Joy R. Villaflor
Cast	Jolo Revilla, Rima Ostwani, Jomari Yllana, Ana Capri, Gary Estrada, Timmy Cruz, Liza Lorena, Jay-R Siaboc, Maurice Mabutas
Award	2011 PMPC Star Awards for Television's "Best Drama/Mini-Series"

NOTE: Aside from Saturday night (August 15, 2009, as Tiagong Akyat; August 28, 2010, as Elias Paniki), Season 2 was already moved to January 24, 2011, but unofficially ended on March 18 for the cancellation of the series.

== See also ==
- List of programs broadcast by ABS-CBN
- Tiagong Akyat
- Pepeng Agimat
- Tonyong Bayawak
- Elias Paniki
