= Kelly Misa =

Filipino model and television host

- Born: Raquel Denise Galvez Misa; August 28, 1981 (age 44); Manila, Philippines
- Occupations: Model, TV host
- Years active: 2004–present
- Modeling information
- Height: 5 ft 7 in (170 cm)
- Hair color: Black
- Eye color: Dark Brown
- Agency: Star Magic (2010–2012)

Raquel Denise "Kelly" Galvez Misa (born August 28, 1981) is a Filipina model and TV host. She has appeared in several Philippine magazine publications and commercials locally and is considered one of the Philippines' most recognizable faces in print ads, commercials and ramp modeling. She is also a beauty columnist.

== Career ==
Kelly Misa started as a part-time ramp model, she then first came to the attention of media when she became finalist for Teen Model Search of Teen Magazine, she was then featured the same year and was in the cover of the May 2001 edition of Teen Magazine together with KC Montero. She appeared in several commercial endorsements notably the "Bakit Ngayon Ka Lang?" (Why just now) campaign for Kentucky Fried Chicken, the Globe Telecom summer of 2005 advertising campaign, the Pond's Whitening campaign and Pantene TVC. She has appeared on local magazine editions of Cosmopolitan, Seventeen, and local titles Mega Magazine, Preview, Candy, Mobile Philippines and Chalk Magazine. Kelly is also an image model for the local retail designer-line folded and hung and the clothing company Pink Soda.

Kelly Misa ranked 6 at FHM 100 Sexiest Women in the World in 2005 and the next year she ranked 4 in the FHM Philippines sexiest women of 2006 and again the following year ranking 5 in the FHM Philippines 100 sexiest women of 2007.

== Personal life ==
Kelly graduated from high school at Colegio de San Agustin in Makati. She is a bachelor's degree graduate from De La Salle University in Manila, majoring in Organizational Communication. She sends regular updates about her on her Twitter page which she herself maintains. She has been a regular attendee at fashion events in which has associated her as a fashionista.

== Television ==
- Wowowee (2010) - Co-host
- Elias Paniki (2010) - Raya
- Showtime (2010) - guest judge
- M3: Malay Mo Ma-develop (2010) - Lisa De Asis
- Kristine (2010) - Mylene
