= Maruja =

English rock band

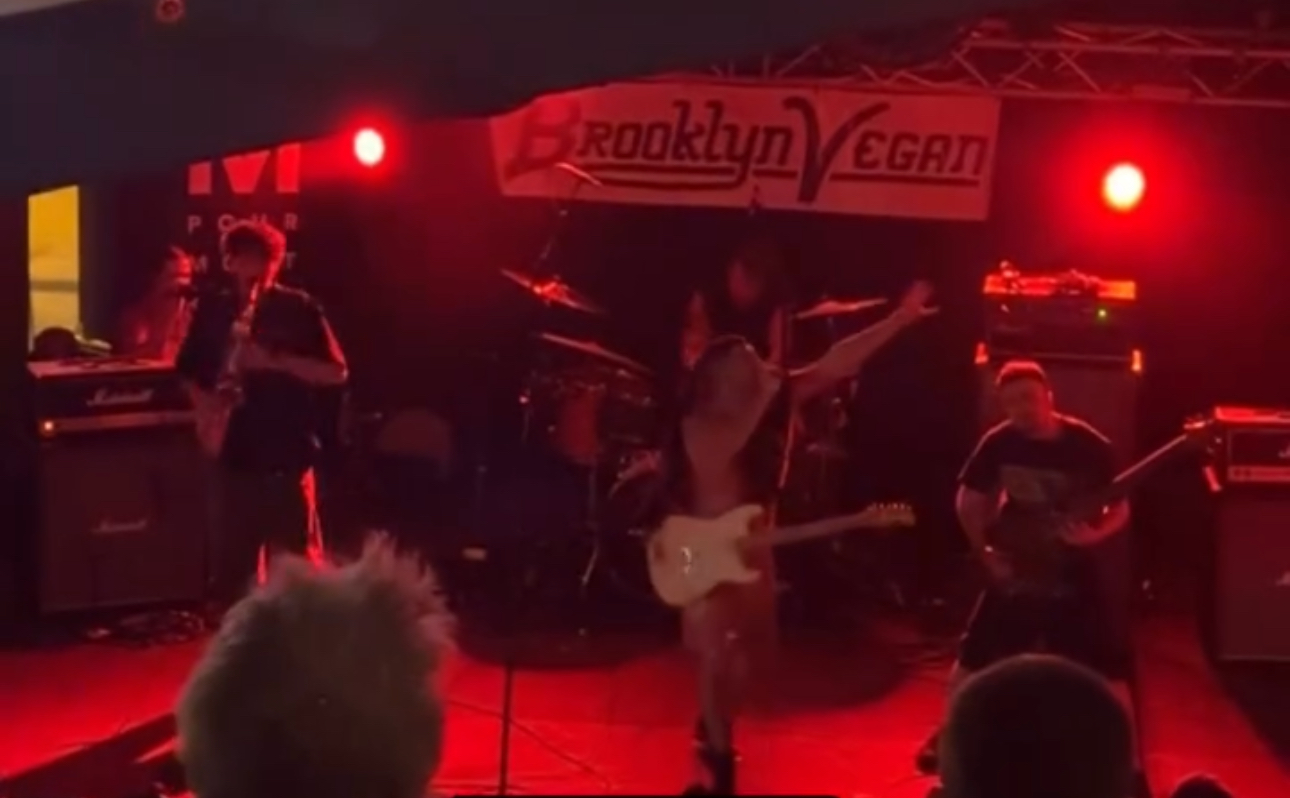
- Maruja at SXSW in 2025

Background information
- Origin: Manchester, England
- Genres: Post-rock; post-punk; art rock; jazz-rock; noise rock; free jazz; punk jazz; prog rock
- Years active: 2014–present
- Label: Music for Nations
- Members: Harry Wilkinson; Joe Carroll; Matt Buonaccorsi; Jacob Hayes
- Past members: Liam Laurence
- Website: marujaofficial.co.uk

Maruja (/məˈruːdʒə/) are an English rock band formed in Manchester in 2014. Their band consists of Harry Wilkinson (lead vocals, guitar), Joe Carroll (saxophone, vocals), Matt Buonaccorsi (bass) and Jacob Hayes (drums).

The band gained attention through their EPs Knocknarea (2023) and Connla's Well (2024), combining elements of post-rock, jazz-rock and noise rock. They released their debut studio album, Pain to Power, in September 2025, which reached number eleven on the UK Vinyl Albums Chart and thirteen on the UK Physical Albums Chart.

== History ==
=== 2014–2019: Formation and early years ===
Prior to the formation of the band, Harry Wilkinson and Matt Buonaccorsi were childhood friends and both attended The Manchester College. Together with guitarist Liam Laurence and a drummer, the group formed Maruja in 2014. The band's name was inspired by a store sign that Wilkinson saw during a family holiday in Spain.

The band released their self-titled debut EP in 2016. It was followed by the Explicit Trickery EP in 2017. Between 2017 and 2018, saxophonist Joe Carroll joined the band and the original drummer was replaced by Jacob Hayes. The band released their third EP, Compassion, in 2019. Laurence left the band in 2019 due to "creative differences". Afterwards, the band disowned their prior releases, with Carroll stating, "it doesn't represent where we are musically".

=== 2020–2023: New line-up and Knocknarea ===
In 2020, Maruja released two non-album singles under the new line-up: "Tao" on 16 March and "Rage" on 27 November.

In September 2021, it was reported that singer Louis Tomlinson had donated £4000 to the band's GoFundMe page after their equipment had been stolen, leading them to reach their overall target of £6000.

On 17 March 2023, the band released Knocknarea, their fourth EP and first under the new line-up. Three of the EP's tracks—"Blind Spot", "The Tinker" and "Thunder"—were released as singles prior to its release.

=== 2024–present: Connla's Well, The Vault and label signing ===
Maruja announced their fifth EP Connla's Well on 25 March 2024, which was released on 26 April 2024. It was preceded by the singles "Zeitgeist", "One Hand Behind the Devil" and "The Invisible Man". Matt Mitchell of Paste praised the EP, calling it "intense and compelling" and "a symphonic, crushing listen that'll challenge your own entropy". Our Culture Mag ranked the EP number 4 on its year-end list of the 25 best EPs of 2024.

On 30 August 2024, the band released The Vault exclusively to YouTube and Bandcamp, comprising a collection of six jam sessions recorded between 2021 and 2023.

In late 2024, the band signed to Music for Nations. Their first single under the label, "Break the Tension", was released on 3 October 2024.

On 9 May 2025, the band announced their debut album, Pain to Power, which was released on 12 September of that year by Music for Nations.

== Musical style and influences ==
The band's sound has been variously labelled as post-rock, post-punk, art rock, jazz-rock, noise rock and post-hardcore. Rishi Shah of NME described the band's style as "noisy jazz-punk".

The band have acknowledged jazz and electronic musicians such as Shpongle, Floating Points, Kamasi Washington, Alice Coltrane and Pharoah Sanders as influences. Wilkinson has cited hip-hop artists such as Tupac, Kendrick Lamar and Little Simz as major influences on his performing style. Buonaccorsi has mentioned Swans as a key influence on his bass playing, naming them his "favourite band ever".

== Members ==
Current members

- Harry Wilkinson – lead vocals, guitar (2014–present)
- Matt Buonaccorsi – bass guitar (2014–present)
- Joe Carroll – alto saxophone, vocals (2017–present)
- Jacob Hayes – drums (2018–present)

Former members

- Liam Laurence – guitar (2014–2019)
- [unknown name] – drums (2014–2018)

== Discography ==
=== Albums ===
- Pain to Power (2025, Music for Nations)

=== EPs ===
- Maruja EP (2016)
- Explicit Trickery (2017)
- Compassion (2019)
- Knocknarea (2023)
- Connla's Well (2024)
- Tir na nÓg (2025)

=== Demos ===
- The Vault (2024)

=== Singles ===
List of singles, showing year released and album name
Title	Year	Album
"Tao"	2020	Non-album single
"Rage"	2020	Non-album single
"Blind Spot"	2022	Knocknarea
"The Tinker"	2022	Knocknarea
"Thunder"	2022	Knocknarea
"Zeitgeist"	2023	Connla's Well
"One Hand Behind the Devil"	2023	Connla's Well
"The Invisible Man"	2024	Connla's Well
"Break the Tension"	2024	Pain to Power
"Look Down on Us"	2025	Pain to Power
"Saoirse"	2025	Pain to Power
"Trenches"	2025	Pain to Power
