= Captain Boom =

Filipino comic book character

Publication information
- Publisher: PSG Publishing House
- First appearance: United Komiks (1966)
- Created by: Mars Ravelo; Ric Ravelo

In-story information
- Alter ego: Lance Mercado
- Species: Human
- Team affiliations: Isang Lakas
- Notable aliases: Kapitan Boom
- Abilities: Flight; Super speed Heightened sense of hearing Sonic powers such as sonic shield and sonic roar

Captain Boom is a Filipino comic book character who fights crime that was created by Mars Ravelo and illustrated by his son Ric Ravelo. Captain Boom first appeared in United Komiks of PSG Publishing House in 1966. When the character was first introduced in television, his character is renamed to Kapitan Boom. Kapitan is a Tagalog word for "captain."

== Character background ==
Captain Boom is a crime fighter that can fly and run fast. He also have an amplified hearing and able to create a sonic shield and sonic roar.^{[Note 1]} He does not have super strength but upon generating a sonic shield on his fist and hitting a vehicle, it can have a dent without making a damage on his hand. All of his powers are produced through sonic means. He has the ability of flight due to the creation of sound waves and thus, he cannot fly in space because there is no sound there.

He dons a red suit with a three-star emblem on his chest and a blue cape. His grandmother made his first costume out of a red shirt and pants together with a handkerchief with holes that serves as a mask.

== In other media ==
In 2008, Captain Boom's character was featured on Komiks Presents: Kapitan Boom, a television series that was aired on ABS-CBN. The character was renamed to "Kapitan Boom" and was portrayed by Jon Avila. His alter-ego, Lance Mercado, was played by Jay-R Siaboc.

== Collected editions ==
Title	Volume	Issue	Date
Mars Ravelo's Captain Boom	United Komiks	#73	October 29, 1966

== See also ==
- List of Filipino superheroes

== Notes ==
1. ^{1} In the 2008 television series, the terms used are super shield and super boom instead of sonic shield and sonic roar respectively.
