= Mars Ravelo =

Filipino comic book artist and writer (1916–1988)

- Born: October 9, 1916; Tanza, Cavite, Philippine Islands
- Died: September 12, 1988 (aged 71); Manila, Philippines
- Resting place: Sta. Cruz Memorial Park, Tanza, Cavite
- Occupations: Comic book cartoonist, graphic novelist

Marcial "Mars" Custodio Ravelo (October 9, 1916 – September 12, 1988) was a Filipino comic book cartoonist and graphic novelist. Dubbed as the "King of Pinoy Komiks", he is notable for creating Darna, Dyesebel, Captain Barbell, Lastikman, Bondying, Varga, Wanted: Perfect Mother, Hiwaga, Maruja, Mariposa, Roberta, Rita, Buhay Pilipino, Jack and Jill, Flash Bomba, Tiny Tony, and Dragonna among others.

== Early life ==
Mars Ravelo was born on October 9, 1916, when America still occupied the Philippines.

== Career ==
Ravelo started out as a cartoonist, then as a writer, and later on as editor-in-chief for two publication houses and for several film companies. He later established his own company, RAR.

Ravelo crafted iconic characters such as Darna the superheroine, Dyesebel the lovelorn mermaid, and Captain Barbell the superhero, along with Facifica Falayfay, and the comedic pair Jack & Jill. He also developed the drama centered on a young orphan named Roberta for Sampaguita Pictures. Additionally, Ravelo penned the film adaptation of Alicia Vergel's "Basahang Ginto." He is known as the "King of Pinoy Komiks."

== Death ==
Mars Ravelo died on September 12, 1988, due to heart attack.

== List of Mars Ravelo's comic books ==
- Bondying
- Buhay Pilipino
- Captain Barbell
- Darna
- Dragonna
- Flash Bomba
- Hiwaga
- Jack and Jill
- Kapitan Boom
- Lastikman
- Mariposa
- Maruja
- Rita
- Roberta
- Tiny Tony
- Varga
- Wanted: Perfect Mother

== Published works (in alphabetical order) ==
Title	First appearance	Adaptation(s)
3 Sisters	Pilipino Komiks #178 (March 27, 1954)	Film
4 na Maria		Film
Allen Borre		
Alex Anasco		
Ako’y Nauuhaw	Tagalog Klasiks (1962)	
Ako’y Tao…May Dugo at Laman	Kislap Komiks (1968)	Film
Alicia Alonzo	Pilipino Komiks (1962)	
Alipin ng Busabos	Bulaklak (1968)	Film
Alyas James Bond-ying	Bondying Komiks (1969)	
Anak ni Dyesebel	Liwayway (1963)	Film
And God Smiled at Me		Film
Ang Biyenan Kong Amerikana	Pilipino Komiks #190 (September 11, 1954)	
Ang Biyenang Hindi Tumatawa		Film
Ang Daya-Daya	Liwayway (February 17, 1964)	
Ang Iniluluha Ko'y Dugo		Film
Ang Pinasulabi	Hiligaynon (1973)	
Angelito	Hiligaynon (1973)	
Baby Bubut	Tagalog Klasiks #223 (January 18, 1958)	Film
Bagong Daigdig	Bulaklak Magazine (September 8, 1948)	
Balahibong Nangangalisag		
Bartola (Ang Mangangatay)	Hiwaga Komiks (1965)	
Basahang Ginto	Hiwaga Komiks	Film, TV series
Bata Batuta	Kislap Komiks (1951)	
Bawat Kaluskos…Lagim	Holiday Komiks (1988)	
Bemboy	Mabuhay Extra (1939)	
Berdugo ng mga Anghel	Hiwaga Komiks (1950)	Film
Big Berta	Bulaklak (1965)	
Bitter Sweet (Ang Pait at ang Tamis)	Pilipino Komiks (1967)	Film
Biyenang Hindi Tumawa		
Bobby	Pilipino Komiks (1958)	Film
Boboy	Sinagtala (1949)	
Boksingera	Tagalog Klasiks #164 (October 15, 1955)	Film
Bondying	Pilipino Komiks (August 29, 1953)	Film, TV series
Bong Bong		Film
Booma	Pilipino Komiks (1961)	
Boyoyoy	Pilipino Komiks (1958)	
Bruno Diablo	Gem Komiks (1983)	
Buhay Pilipino		
Bulaklak ng Dagat	Bulaklak at Paruparo (1982)	
Bwana Hai	Pinoy Komiks (1965)	
Cadena de Amor		Film
Captain Barbell	Pinoy Komiks #1 (May 23, 1963)	Film, TV series
Captain Barbell Kontra Kapitan Bakal	Pinoy Komiks (1964)	Film
Captain Barbell Versus Flash Fifita	Liwayway (1968)	
Captain Boom	United Komiks (1966)	TV series
Chris Jay Medinilla		
Cumbanchera	Tagalog Klasiks (1952)	Film
Dalaginding na si Tessie	Tagalog Klasiks (1954)	
Darna	Pilipino Komiks #77 (May 13, 1950)	Film, TV series, webcomic, song, dance, TV commercial
Darna at Ang Babaing Lawin	Pilipino Komiks (1951)	Film
Darna at Ang Babaing Linta	Darna Komiks (1968)	
Darna at Ang Babaing Tuod	Liwayway (1964)	Film
Darna at ang Black Widow	Mars Ravelo Komiks (1980)	
Darna at Ang Impakta	Kenkoy Komiks (1962)	Film
Darna at ang Planetman	Holiday Komiks (1968)	Film
Darna Versus Satanina Dayabolika	Kampeon Komiks (1977)	
Darna Vs. Zumarna	Darna Komiks (1992)	
David Arkanghel	Bulaklak at Paruparo (1976)	
Devil Pig	Pioneer Komiks (1964)	
Devlin	Redondo Komix (1963)	
Divina Gracia	Pilipino Komiks (1970)	Film
Diyosa, Queen of the Dancing Waters	Pilipino Komiks (1955)	Film
Dobol Trobol	Pilipino Komiks (1959)	
Dolfo and the Time Machine	Liwayway (1975)	
Dragonna		TV series
Dugo sa Mukha ng Buwan	Pioneer Komiks (1965)	
Dyangga		
Dyesebel	Pilipino Komiks #1 (1952)	Film, TV series
Edmund Lee		
Elepanta	Espesyal Komiks (1967)	
Ella Bajao		
Espira		
Eternally	Espesyal Komiks (1956)	Film
Facifica Falayfay	Pilipino Komiks (1968)	Film
Fantastic 4	Bulaklak at Paruparo (1974)	
Fil-American Girl	Espesyal Komiks (1962)	Film
First Kiss	Tin-Edyers Songs & Shows (1969)	
Flash Bomba	Tagalog Klasiks (1967)	TV series
Galo Gimbal	Pinoy Klasiks (1965)	Film
Ganid, The Last Man on Earth	Bondying Komiks (1969)	
Garuda	Space Horror Comix (1988)	
Gavin Villacosta		
Ging	Liwayway (1963)	Film
Gog	Pilipino Komiks (1964)	
Golpe de gulat		Film
Goomba	Tagalog Klasiks (1966)	
Goomboo-Roomboo	Pioneer Komiks (1967)	
Goomboo Roomboo 1987	Holiday Komiks (1986)	
Gorgonia	Mars Ravelo Komiks (1977)	Film
Goro	Pioneer Komiks (1962)	
Goyo	Aliwan Komiks (1965)	
Gringgo		
Guardians of the galaxy		
Gumuhong Daigdig	Tagalog Klasiks (1967)	
Handsome	Hiwaga Komiks (1958)	Film
Haydee (The Brown Girl & The White Idol)	TSS Komiks (1967)	Film
Hayok sa Dugo	Liwayway (1988)	
Higantina, Da Big Byuti	Bulaklak at Paruparo (1978)	
Hootsy-Kootsy	Espesyal Komiks (1954)	Film
Hudas sa Hudas	Aliwan Komiks (1968)	
Huwag Mong Tupukin ang Langit	Damdamin Komiks (1988)	
I Believe	Hiwaga Komiks (1960)	Film
Impakta	Bulaklak (1966)	
I'm Sorry, My Love		Film
Iniluha Ko’y Dugo	Liwayway (1965)	
Inspirasyon	Tagalog Klasiks (1953)	Film
Isandalosa		Film
Isang Lakas		
Ismol bat Teribol		Film
Isputnik vs. Darna		Film
Ito Ba Ang Aking Ina?	Tagalog Klasiks (1961)	Film
Jack and Jill	Tagalog Klasiks (1953)	Film
Jesus Iscariote	Bulaklak (1978)	
Jikiriz	Bulaklak	
Jinkee	Sixteen (1968)	Film
Jungle Boy	(1949)	
Kamay ni Bruldo	Espesyal Komiks (1964)	
Kapitan Boom	United Komiks (1966)	TV series
Kiko	Hiwaga Komiks (1953)	Film
Kiti-kiti	Pilipino Komiks (1964)	
Kontra Partido	Hiwaga Komiks (1955)	Film
Kwatang (A Star is Born)	Pilipino Komiks (1966)	Film
Lastikman	Aliwan Komiks Vol. 1 #49 (August 31, 1964), Holiday Komiks (1968)	Film, TV series
Leona	Bulaklak at Paruparo (1974)	
Little Lucy	Pilipino Komiks (1960)	Film
Lola Belay	Mars Ravelo Komiks (1980)	
Lumuha Pati Mga Anghel		Film
Magic Guitar	Kislap Komiks (1966)	Film
Magic Makinilya	Hiwaga Komiks (1969)	Film
Maldito Corazon	Espesyal Komiks (1961)	
Mambo-Dyambo	Pilipino Komiks (1955)	Film
Mariposa	Espesyal Komiks (1954)	Film
Maruja	Pilipino Komiks (1966)	Film, TV series
Mga Balahibong Nangangalisag	Holiday Komiks (1964)	
Miss Tilapia	Espesyal Komiks (1955)	Film
Mowmoo	Hiwaga Komiks (1966)	
Nakangiting Halimaw	Tagalog Klasiks (1965)	
Ngitnit ng Pitong Whistle Bomb	Pilipino Komiks (1967)	Film
Nora and the Haunted House	Superstar Komiks (1972)	
Ophella at Paris		Film
Pomposa	Espesyal Komiks (1967)	Film
Prinsesa Gusgusin	Tagalog Klasiks (1956)	Film
Raul Roldan	Hiwaga Komiks (1951)	Film
Rebecca	Tagalog Klasiks (1951)	Film
Renee Rose		Film
Ric Benson	Bulaklak (1947)	
Rita	Bulaklak (1947)	
Rita Okay	Tagalog Klasiks	
Roberta	Tagalog Klasiks (1950)	Film
Rodora	Pilipino Komiks (1955)	Film
Rosa Rossini	Espesyal Komiks (1958)	Film
Rowena	Espesyal Komiks (1968)	Film
Rubi-Rosa	Pilipino Komiks (1957)	Film
Sa Bawat Saglit…Sindak	Pogi Magazine (1969)	
Selosang-Selosa	Espesyal Komiks (1957)	
Sex Symbol	Kislap Komiks (1965)	
Si Gorio at si Tekla	Tagalog Klasiks (1950)	Film
Silveria, Ang Kabayong Daldalera	Hiwaga Komiks (1957)	Film
Sindak!	Pioneer Komiks (1966)	
Suicide Susy	Pilipino Komiks (1962)	Film
Taong Tuod	Holiday Komiks (1963)	
Teksas, Ang Manok na Nagsasalita	Pilipino Komiks (1952)	Film
The Sisters		Film
Thunderstar	Sixteen (1973)	
Tiny Tony	Pinoy Komiks (1965)	TV series
Torpe (Inferiority Complex)	Hiwaga Komiks (1954)	Film
Totit	Sinagtala (1950)	
Trahe de trahedya		Film
Trudis Liit		Film, TV series
Tubog sa Ginto		Film
Tumbando Caña	Tagalog Klasiks (1955)	Film
Varga	Bulaklak Magazine Vol. 4 #17 (July 23, 1947), Bulaklak at Paruparo	TV series
Varga at ang Impakta	Bulaklak at Paruparo (1982)	
Via Dolorosa	Espesyal Komiks (1955)	Film
Vicky	Tagalog Klasiks (1958)	Film
Villa Viejo	Espesyal Komiks (1952)	
Wamboo	Liwayway (1973)	
Wander Ella		
Wanted: Perfect Mother		Film
Zorina	Pilipino Komiks (1956)	

== Legacy ==
=== In popular culture ===
The life story of Mars Ravelo was featured in the anthology series Magpakailanman on May 26, 2005, with actor Dennis Trillo portraying Ravelo.
