= Tiny Tony =

Filipino comic book character

- Tiny Tony fighting a snake

Publication information
- Created by: Mars Ravelo

In-story information
- Alter ego: Anthony Aniscol
- Species: Human mutate
- Abilities: Leading authority in myrmecology research, Size-shifting from nearly microscopic to ~100 feet gigantic (both at extremes), Maintains strength of normal size in shrunken state, Bio-Energy Projection, also known as a Bio-Sting, Superhuman strength and agility

Tiny Tony is a Filipino comic book character created by Mars Ravelo and illustrated by Jim Fernandez.

== In other media ==
=== Television ===
John Prats as Tiny Tony

The 2008 television series Komiks Presents: Tiny Tony stars John Prats.

== Collected editions ==
Title	Volume	Issue	Date
Tiny Tony	Pinoy Komiks Magasin (1965-1966)	#23	
Tiny Tony	Pinoy Komiks Magasin	#88	September 22, 1966

== See also ==
- Isang Lakas
- List of Filipino superheroes
