= Komiks (TV series) =

2006–09 Philippine television fantasy drama series

- Title card
- Genre: Fantasy; Drama; Anthology
- Created by: ABS-CBN Studios
- Starring: Various
- Opening theme: "Sa Mundo ng Komiks" by Kamikazee
- Country of origin: Philippines
- Original language: Tagalog
- No. of episodes: 145 (list of episodes)

Production
- Running time: 1 hour
- Production companies: Dreamscape Entertainment Television; Classified Media; Star Creatives

Original release
- Network: ABS-CBN
- Release: February 4, 2006 – August 8, 2009

Komiks (lit. 'comics') is a Philippine fantasy drama anthology television series broadcast by ABS-CBN. It aired on the network's Saturday evening line up from February 4, 2006, to August 8, 2009, replacing My Juan and Only and was replaced by Agimat: Ang Mga Alamat ni Ramon Revilla. The series featured popular local comic book stories by Filipino comic writers Pablo S. Gomez, Francisco V. Coching, Mars Ravelo, Elena M. Patron and Jim M. Fernandez.

== Episodes ==
For a detailed episode guide, see the main article below.

The first season presented 12 distinct stories over the course of 13 episodes. One of the stories (Agua Bendita) had two parts.

The second season likewise had 12 distinct stories but had 15 episodes, because three of the stories (Inday sa Balitaw, Bampy, and Si Pardina at mga Duwende) had two parts each.

The third and fourth season of Komiks breaks from the pattern of the first two seasons, with the entire season devoted to a single series, Da Adventures of Pedro Penduko. Matt Evans of Pinoy Big Brother: Teen Edition 1 starred in the title role. A sequel Pedro Penduko at ang Mga Engkantao starred an ensemble cast.

After the much successful airing of Pedro Penduko series, Komiks resumed airing in 2008 for a sixth season with a collection of works from Mars Ravelo, with Kapitan Boom as its first offering. This was followed by Varga, Tiny Tony, Dragonna and Flash Bomba.

A horror drama series Nasaan Ka Maruja?, based on the 1950s comic by Mars Ravelo, aired in 2009.

=== Release ===
Series	Season	Episodes	Originally aired	
Series	Season	Episodes	First aired	Last aired
Original series
Komiks	1	13	February 4, 2006	May 6, 2006
Komiks	2	15	May 13, 2006	September 2, 2006
Komiks Presents: Pedro Penduko series
Da Adventures of Pedro Penduko	3	15	September 9, 2006	December 23, 2006
Da Adventures of Pedro Penduko	4	18	December 30, 2006	April 28, 2007
Pedro Penduko at ang Mga Engkantao	5	26	May 5, 2007	October 27, 2007
Komiks Presents: Mars Ravelo series
Mars Ravelo's Kapitan Boom	6	15	April 26, 2008	August 2, 2008
Mars Ravelo's Varga	7	13	August 9, 2008	October 11, 2008
Mars Ravelo's Tiny Tony	8	10	October 18, 2008	December 13, 2008
Mars Ravelo's Dragonna	9	8	December 20, 2008	February 7, 2009
Mars Ravelo's Flash Bomba	10	11	February 14, 2009	April 25, 2009
Mars Ravelo's Nasaan Ka Maruja?	11	15	May 2, 2009	August 8, 2009

==== Canceled projects ====
Title	Cast	Source
Zoila's Supergee	Judy Ann Santos	
Mars Ravelo's Isang Lakas	Jon Avila, Vhong Navarro, Mariel Rodriguez, John Prats, Shaina Magdayao, Luis Manzano	
Mars Ravelo's Sanlakas Kids		
Pablo S. Gomez's Babaeng Pusa	Aubrey Miles, Troy Montero	

== Awards ==
- 2006 PMPC Star Awards for Television's Best Horror-Fantasy Program (tied with Ang Mahiwagang Baul of GMA-7).
- 2007 PMPC Star Awards for Television's Best Horror-Fantasy Program for Da Adventures of Pedro Penduko.

== See also ==
- List of programs previously aired by ABS-CBN
- Da Adventures of Pedro Penduko
- Pedro Penduko at ang Mga Engkantao
- Lastikman (TV series)
