= Ramon Revilla Sr. =

Filipino politician and actor (1927–2020)

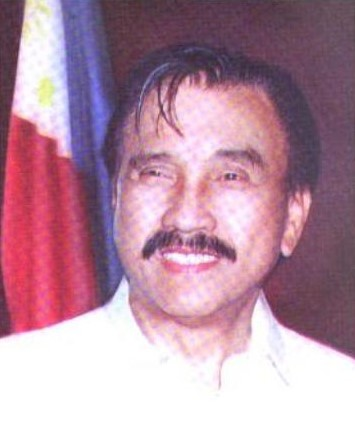
- Official portrait, 1997

Senator of the Philippines
- In office June 30, 1992 – June 30, 2004

Personal details
- Born: Jose Acuña Bautista; March 8, 1927 Imus, Cavite, Philippine Islands
- Died: June 26, 2020 (aged 93) Taguig, Philippines
- Party: Lakas (1998; 2000–2020)
- Other political affiliations: LAMMP (1998–2000); LDP (1992–1998); Independent (1987–1992)
- Spouse: Azucena Mortel (died 1998)
- Children: 72 (including Bong, Ram, and Strike)
- Education: Far Eastern University (Bcom)
- Occupation: Actor, politician, producer
- Awards: Famas Best Actor (1974); Famas Presidential Award (2005); Special Award Outstanding Star of The Century (2019); Posthumous Award (2021)

Ramon Bautista Revilla Sr. (Tagalog pronunciation: [rɛˈbiljɐ]; born Jose Acuña Bautista; March 8, 1927 – June 26, 2020), popularly known simply as Ramon Revilla Sr. or simply Ramon Revilla, was a Filipino actor who served as a senator of the Philippines.

He was known as the "Hari ng Agimat" and the "King of True to Life Stories" in Philippine cinema.

== Education ==
Revilla graduated in Far Eastern University wherein he finished his bachelor's degree in commerce.

== Film career ==
In his initial entry to the film industry, the young Revilla was cast only in bit roles which was not enough for him so he left the film industry to become head of the Secret Service Unit of the Bureau of Customs in 1965.

He returned to the film industry in 1972 with the film Nardong Putik: Kilabot ng Cavite, which started his fame.

He also returned on his own terms, creating his own film production, Imus Productions, for him to star in. Together with partner Azucena, they ran the film outfit with Revilla writing and directing his films under the pseudonym Jose Yandoc.

His characters in the films "Pepeng Agimat" and "Nardong Putik" gave him the image of being an invincible superhuman who had in his keeping a special anting-anting (amulet of superhuman powers). This image of his is somewhat alive because ABS-CBN adapted his 4 major films into television series entitled Agimat: Ang Mga Alamat ni Ramon Revilla.

=== Accolades ===
In 1973, Revilla won a Famas Best Actor Award for "Hulihin si Tiyagong Akyat" together with his son Marlon Bautista for a Famas Best Child Actor Award of the same movie. Imus Productions was also recognized as Outstanding Film production in 1975. The next year, Revilla snagged the Outstanding Producer of the Year Award.

In 1979, he was Most Outstanding Actor and Box Office King.

In 2011, in the 33rd Catholic Mass Media Awards Night (CMMA), Revilla was given the Lifetime Achievement Award.

== Political career ==
In 1987, he ran for a Senate spot by using his real name in the ballot and being an independent, and lost.

In 1992, Revilla became a senator, placing 2nd behind another actor Tito Sotto. Both of them were members of the Laban ng Demokratikong Pilipino (LDP) at the time. He served as chairman of the Senate Committee on Motion Pictures and Television in the 10th and 11th Congresses, working on legislations pertaining to the advancement of the Philippine Motion Picture Industry and children's welfare.

Despite having a number of detractors, Senator Revilla was the author of some important bills, including the "Revilla Law" lowering the penalties imposed on the illegal possession of firearms, which had been increased by a law signed during the administration of former President Ferdinand Marcos.

An amendment to the Family Code of the Philippines, enacted into the law in February 2004, states "The illegitimate children may use the surname of their father if their affiliation has been expressly recognized by the father through the record of birth appearing in the civil register, or when an admission in a public document or private handwritten instrument is made by the father." "The child should not suffer the stigma of his illegitimacy," Revilla Sr. once quoted saying.

In 1998, he jumped into Lakas, and won another term. After the elections, he also joined Lapian ng Masang Pilipino (LAMP) of then-incumbent President and fellow action star Joseph Estrada. But after the lower house impeached Estrada, he rejoined Lakas and stayed with said party until the end of his final term in 2004.

== Ram Revilla murder ==
On October 17, 2013, Revilla broke his silence and officially aired his emotions about Ram Revilla's murder case and Ramon Joseph's detainment:

"I felt like the world fell on me when I was informed that my son Ramón Joseph was not allowed by the court to post bail. I do believe that my son cannot do anything heinous. My children grew up in the word of God. He was a good son. He was arrested without a warrant of arrest and he has been suffering in jail for almost two years. My son is innocent."

— Ramon Revilla, Sr.,

== Personal life and death ==
Revilla was the youngest child of the 10 children of businessman Ildefonso Bautista and Andrea Acuña.

His first children were with the mother of Evelyn Bautista, who married the basketball player (and later senator) Robert Jaworski.

He was married to Azucena Mortel, who was born on February 16, 1944, and died on May 31, 1998, at the age of 54. They produced seven children: Marlon, Rowena Bautista-Mendiola, Jose Mari (Bong Revilla), Rebecca Bautista-Ocampo (Princess Revilla), Edwin (Strike Revilla), Andrea Bautista-Ynares, and Diana. With his extramarital affairs, his children numbered at least 39; Bong's spokesperson Portia Ilagan claimed that the number reached 72. In a 2004 interview with journalist Jessica Soho, Revilla admitted that he probably has more than 80 children. Actor Ram Revilla and film producer and politician Ramon Nicolas Bautista were two of his children from his extramarital affairs.

On May 31, 2020, Revilla was rushed to the St. Dominic Medical Center in Bacoor, Cavite. The next day, he was transferred to the St. Luke's Medical Center in Bonifacio Global City, Taguig, where he stayed in the intensive care unit for two weeks. Revilla Sr. died of heart failure at around 5:20pm PHT on June 26, 2020, aged 93.

== Legacy ==
=== Revilla statue ===
On his 84th birthday, a statue was unveiled to the public. The 10-meter (33 ft) bronze statue was made by Filipino sculptor and national artist Eduardo Castrillo. It was unveiled at Revilla's residence in Bacoor, Cavite. Also during this event, Revilla's children gave him another surprise by officially opening the "Memo Revilla," a museum showcasing his old photographs and film memorabilia such as the "anting-anting" (amulet) and "panday" (sword). His star-studded birthday celebration was attended by the biggest names in Philippine show business and politics alike. Former presidents Joseph Ejercito Estrada and Gloria Macapagal Arroyo were among the big personalities who came to the event.

== Electoral history ==
Electoral history of Ramon Revilla Sr.
Year	Office	Party	Votes received				Result
Year	Office	Party	Total	%	P.	Swing	Result
1987	Senator of the Philippines	Independent	5,203,982	22.88%	33rd	—N/a	Lost
1992	Senator of the Philippines	LDP	8,321,278	34.31%	2nd	—N/a	Won
1998	Senator of the Philippines	Lakas–NUCD–UMDP	8,683,500	29.65%	10th	—N/a	Won

== Filmography ==
Year	Title	Role
1951	Pulo ng Engkanto	(as Gallardo Acuña)
1951	Yolanda	(as Gallardo Acuña)
1952	Tenyente Carlos Blanco	(as Gallardo Acuña)
1952	Ulila ng Bataan	
1952	Siklab sa Batangas	
1953	Recuerdo	
1953	Mister Kasintahan	
1953	May Umaga Pang Darating	
1953	Gorio at Tekla	
1954	Matandang Dalaga	
1954	Anak sa Panalangin	
1955	Sa Dulo ng Landas	
1955	Kurdapya	
1955	Bim, Bam, Bum	
1955	Balisong	
1955	Binibining Kalog	
1956	Babalu	
1957	Tarhata	
1957	Katawang Lupa	
1959	Big Time Berto	
1959	Pitong Biyuda	
1960	Matandang Pa-Charming	Tomas
1960	Gabi ng Lagim (segment 1)	
1960	Walang Daigdig	Tiagong Bulag
1960	True Confessions	
1960	Johnny Davao	
1961	Dakilang 9	
1961	Pantalan 3	
1961	Magdasal Kana!	
1962	Santa Clarang Pinung-Puno	
1962	Sakdalista	
1962	Kadiong Ngiti	
1964	Scout Rangers	
1964	Mariveles	
1964	Kumander Fidela	
1968	Liku-Likung Landas	
1972	Nardong Putik: Kilabot ng Cavite	Leonardo Manicio Alyas Nardong Putik
1973	Pepeng Agimat: Sa Daigdig ng Kababalaghan	Pepe
1973	Hulihin si Tiagong Akyat	Santiago Ronquillo
1974	Kill RP-9 O	Steve Vergada, Agent Nine-O
1974	Sunugin ang Samar	
1974	Kapitan Eddie Set: Mad Killer of Cavite	Kap. Eddie Set
1974	Ibilanggo si Cavite Boy	Cavite Boy
1974	Kill... The Carnapers	Cameo Role
1974	Happy Days Are Here Again	Himself
1975	Kapitan Kulas Kilabot ng Sierra Madre	Kulas
1975	Balakyot	
1975	Paglaya Ko...	
1975	Dugo at Pag Ibig sa Kapirasong Lupa	Aguilar (segment 2)
1976	Ang Lihim ni Rosa Henson sa Buhay ni Kumander Lawin	Kumander Lawin
1976	Bergado: Terror of Cavite	Bergado
1976	Rebel Hunter	Brig. Gen. Romeo G. Gatan
1976	Beloy Montemayor	Beloy Montemayor
1976	Hustler Squad	Paco Rodriguez
1976	Bertong Suklab	Berto
1976	Mario Alarcon	Mario
1977	Gulapa (Ang Barakong Mayor ng Maragondon)	Gulapa
1977	Bianong Bulag	Bibiano Angeles aka Bianong Bulag
1977	Task Force Kingfisher	
1977	Asawa Ko Silang Lahat (Sa Puting Tabing)	Rading Ruiz
1978	Malabanan	
1978	Last Target	Nardo
1978	Camerino	Dominador M. Camerino
1978	Mga Mata ni Angelita	Barrio Kapitan (Guest)
1978	Feliciano	Feliciano
1978	Cobra, Lawin at Dragon	
1978	Boy Imus: Anak Ni Tiagong Akyat	Tiagong Akyat
1978	Reblede Numero Uno	
1979	Boy Putik	
1979	Tonyong Bayawak	Tonyong Bayawak
1979	Matanglawin	Magno
1980	Dang-Dong	Barrio Captain
1980	Mission: Terrorize Panay	Pablito Gepana Alyas Kumander Milan
1980	Leon Ng Central Luzon	
1980	Target!: Kanang Kamay Ni Nardo	Nardong Putik (uncredited)
1980	25 Taong Takas	
1981	Sierra Madre	
1981	Alfredo Sebastian	Alfredo
1981	Kamlon	
1981	Raul Zaragoza	Raul
1981	Tenyente Pugot	
1981	Rampador Alindog	
1982	Labag sa Batas	
1982	Tulisan ng Pasong Musang	
1983	The Killing of Satan (known as Lumaban ka Satanas)	Lando San Miguel
1983	Dugong Buhay	Samuel
1983	Juramentado	Kalmon
1983	Kumander Melody	Melody
1984	Nardong Putik (Kilabot ng Cavite) Version II	Nardong Putik
1984	Kapitan Inggo	Inggo
1985	Sa Dibdib ng Sierra Madre	Cameo role
1985	Victor Lopez, Jr. (Robinhood ng Tondo)	Victor Lopez Jr.
1985	Rustico Acuzar: Waray	Nardo
1985	Kumander Eber: Kilabot Ng Visayas	Eber
1986	Iyo ang Tondo, Kanya ang Cavite	Bador
1986	Kapitan Pablo: Cavite Killing Fields	Pablo
1986	100 Days in September (Bayang Magiting)	
1987	Ultimatum: Ceasefire!	Kumander Ibarra
1987	Feliciano Luces: Alyas Kumander Toothpick, Mindanao	Feliciano Luces
1987	Oscar Ramos: Hitman	Oscar Ramos
1987	Anak ng Lupa	
1987	Pepe Saclao: Public Enemy No. 1	Jose 'Pepe' Saclao
1988	Cordillera	Pv. Umpag Ka Miroy
1988	Alyas Pusa: Ang Taong May 13 Buhay	Lt. Teofilo
1988	Joaquin Burdado	Joaquin Burdado
1988	Ang Supremo	Luis Talusan
1988	Pepeng Kuryente: Man with a Thousand Volts	Pepeng Kuryente
1989	Arrest: Pat. Rizal Alih – Zamboanga Massacre	Rizal Alih
1989	Bala... Dapat Kay Cris Cuenca! (Public Enemy No. 1 of Region 4)	Crisostomo "Cris" Cuenca
1989	Ang Mahiwagang Daigdig ni Elias Paniki	Elias Paniki
1989	Target... Police General (Maj. Gen. Alfredo S. Lim Story)	Alfredo Lim
1990	David Balondo ng Tondo	David Balondo
1990	Apo: Kingpin ng Maynila	Apo Magno
1999	Pepeng Agimat	Apo Damon
2002	Ang Agimat: Anting-Anting ni Lolo	Matandang Ermitanyo
2005	Exodus: Tales from the Enchanted Kingdom	Haring Avalon
