= Mythic humanoids =

Legendary human-like creatures

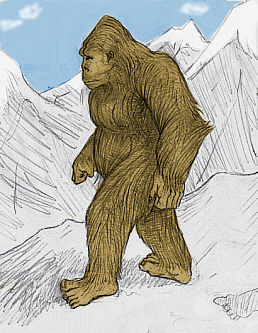
Artistic depiction of a Yeti, a mythical humanoid taller than an average human said to inhabit the Himalayan region of Nepal, Bhutan, and Tibet.

Mythic humanoids are legendary, folkloric, or mythological creatures that are part human, or that resemble humans through appearance or character. Each culture has different mythical creatures that come from many different origins, and many of these creatures are humanoids. They are often able to talk and in many stories they guide the hero on their journey.

== Africa ==
- Jengu – A beautiful, mermaid-like being from Sawabantu spirituality.
- Mami Wata – Mermaid-like water-dwelling humanoids from Central and West African mythology.
- Ogbanje – (Igbo) Spirit who is born into the same family repeatedly and dies young on purpose to drive them into grief.
- Werehyena – Hyaenidae therianthropic creature common in the folklore of North and East Africa and West Asia.

== Americas ==
- Adlet – Dog-like humanoids in Inuit folklore.
- Alom-bag-winno-sis – Dwarf-like aquatic humanoid from Abenaki mythology.
- Anung Ite – (Lakota) Female spirit with two faces and spikes protruding from elbows. Variations from other tribes known as Sharp Legs and Sharp Elbows.
- Asin – (Pacific Northwest) Often called the Basket Woman, this was an ogre-like monster who sneaked up on and captured naughty children, throwing them into a basket on her back to take home and eat.
- Baykok – (Anishinaabeg) Skeletal monster. The ghost of a human cursed for horrific acts in life. Attacks warriors and devours their organs.
- Biboon – (Anishinaabeg) Winter Spirit. Descends from Hudson Bay to cover everything in winter. Described as an old man.
- Bigfoot – Large, hairy, and bipedal ape-like creature taller than a human and said to inhabit forests in North America.
- Boo hag – (American) A shapeshifting witch in Gullah Geechee culture that feeds on the lifeforce of people vampirically in the night. Has also absorbed aspects of elf and Night Mare beliefs from European culture.
- Chindi – (Navajo) The dark side of the soul, which can often separate in death and remain behind in a place as a sort of dark spirit.
- Ciguapa – Mythical women who live in the high mountains of the Dominican Republic in the Caribbean. Of human female form with brown or dark blue skin, backward-facing feet, and very long manes of smooth, glossy hair covering their bodies; nocturnal, hostile, to be avoided.
- El Cucuy – Boogeyman to scare children into being good in Spain, Portugal, and South America. Name comes from the word for "head". Seen as shadowy figure prowling on rooftops, said to eat or kidnap children.
- Encantado – Amazon river dolphins said to occasionally take human form in South American folklore.
- Faceless Spirit – (Iroquois) Appears as female maiden with no face. Collects life force of dead things in her basket and returns it to the Creator to be recycled into new life.
- Fiura – Evil creature in Chilean mythology. A small, nasty woman with large breasts.
- Headless Corpse – (Southeast) headless body that runs around on all fours with gaping mouth where head should be.
- Heyoka – (Lakota) People chosen by the Thunder Beings to be Medicine Men. Possessing supernatural abilities. A Heyoka must have a vision of a Thunder Being or be struck by lightning. May have visions of the future or other abilities. Appear to others as backwards. Acts in backwards behaviors. They are mysterious and move between worlds.
- Ijiraq – (Inuit) Shapeshifting childnapper with red eyes and a sideways face.
- Inipi – (Southern California) Mostly known from the Kawaiisu people, this is the shapeshifting ghost of a human. It may take virtually any form, with given stories depicting it as looking normal, or as a skeleton with extremely long nails. Like modern western ghost lore, it may be aware of its surroundings, or just going through the motions obliviously. They say it starts walking once a person's death is assured, even before they actually die. To get rid of one, a person blows across one's open palm at it.
- Kalku – A Chiloe and Mapuche mythological sorcerer who controls crows and contains dark magic and negative powers.
- Kushtaka – Shapeshifting otter creature found in the folklore of the Tlingit and Tsimshian people.
- Little People – Various fairy/elf-like beings believed in across North America. Some are a couple inches tall and look like humans, some a couple feet and are hairy or look ugly, some take the form of human children. Different types can be mischievous, evil or beneficial.
- Mesingw – (Algonquian) Lenape name for the spirit of the forests. Hairy dwarf who wears a wooden mask to hide deformed face and rides on the back of a white stag. Many different names have been recorded including Mesingholikan with alternate spellings in Mësingholikan, Misinkhalikan, and others.
- Mothman – A large winged cryptid with red eyes.
- Pombero – Mythical humanoid creature of small stature being from Guaraní mythology.
- Qalupalik – (Inuit) Female entities with green skin, webbed hands, and claws that emit shrieks that paralyze men.
- Sabuqwanilnu – (Algonquian) Migmaaq name for a mermaid-like being believed in across Algonquian-speaking peoples. Top half human, bottom half fish, able to control and predict the weather and travel between the human world and the underworld through water. Anishinaabeg myth refers to one trying to take a human husband, the act of bringing him to their world and going through with the marriage turning him into one of them.
- Sasquatch – See Bigfoot.
- Shade – Spirit or ghost of a dead person, residing in the underworld, believed to be a shadowy place. Common to beliefs in the Near East, e.g. Islamic Jinn and the Choctaw Nalusa Chito.
- Shadow people – Dark, nonspecific apparitions in folklore, often taken to be neutral, or harbingers of events.
- Skin-walker – (Navajo) Type of witch with ability to disguise themselves as an animal or turn into one.
- Squawkowtemus – (Abenaki) Female spirit that resides in swamps. Its cries lure people close. If it touches them, they die.
- Stick Indians – (Pacific Northwest) Monsters who materialize from out of the roots of trees and bushes and attack men.
- Stikini - (Seminole) A witch that primarily transforms into a were-owl monster at night, after vomiting up its soul and organs and hanging them in a tree.
- Tariaksuq – (Inuit) Anthropomorphic caribou people who exist as their own separate society in a parallel universe. Only their shadows can be seen in this world, though sometimes glimpses of them can be caught out of the corner of the eye. Only become visible when killed.
- Thunderbirds – (Eastern Woodlands) Most tribes in Eastern Woodlands claim Thunderbirds often shapeshift into people. They live in secret villages atop mountains. Shawnee say they speak backwards.
- Towiŋ – (Lakota) Female spirit who guards the road to the afterlife in Lakota lore. Souls stop at her lodge while she judges their worthiness to progress on to Wanagi Tamakoce (heaven). Said to mean Blue Woman, but can also translate as Aunt. Pronounced tow-wih.
- Trauco – Dwarf- or goblin-like creature that inhabits the woods of Chiloé islands in Chile.
- Tzitzimitl – (Aztec) Female demons who worked for several deities and were worshipped by midwives. Attacked the sun during eclipses and were alleged to be the prophesied cause of the end of the world. Their queen, Ītzpāpālōtl, was a skeletal obsidian butterfly demon. Several other Uto-Aztecan peoples as far north as the Shoshone had similar mythological creatures to her in their lore.
- Wanaģi/Wanuŋchi – (Siouan) The spirits of the dead, almost always take form of shadow people. The word is also the word for soul and shadow. Sometimes referred to as the Night Spirits. Commonly seen at night around burial grounds/mounds. Pronounced wah-nah-khee/wah-nuh-chee.
- Water Babies – (American West) Evil spirit who resides near springs or ponds and takes the form of a crying baby, luring people to pick it up, after which, it becomes so heavy that it crushes them to death.
- Wechuge – (Athabaskan) Cannibal said to be a person who has been possessed or overwhelmed by the monster, or a demonic presence. In return, the person becomes "too strong". Related to the regions of Canada.
- Wendigo – (Algonquian) A human possessed by evil spirit to cannibalize humans and is never sated.
- Werecoyote – A canine therianthropic creature.
- Yacuruna – Hairy beings with deformed feet and their heads turned backwards.
- Zombie – An undead human servant, originating in Haitian folklore.

== Asia ==
- Äbädä - (Turkic) A protective forest spirit. Can take human form, but usually portrayed as having blue skin, green hair, and horns.
- Abasy – (Yakut) One-eyed, one-armed, one-legged monsters. Souls who serve the underworld god, cause madness and disease, and ride two-headed, wingless dragons like horses.
- Alyp Khara Aat Mogoidoon – (Yakut) chief of the Abasy. Described as a giant made of iron with three heads and six arms and legs.
- Angel – (Abrahamic religions) Divine messengers in Abrahamic religions, often depicted in humanoid form.
- Anito or diwata – Philippine indigenous ancestor spirits, heroic spirits, and evil gods.
- Aswang – Philippine shapeshifting human-eating ghouls, vampires, and demons.
- Bak – Assamese aqueous creature that can take human form after killing them.
- Dokkaebi – A mythical being in Korean folklore or fairy tales. Although usually frightening, it could also represent a humorous, grotesque-looking ogre or goblin.
- Ebu Gogo – Human-like creatures in Indonesian mythology.
- Engkanto – Elf-like creatures in Philippine mythology. Most are slender, fair-skinned, and fair-haired, but some are completely jet black.
- Garuda – Vishnu's bird-like mount.
- Ghoul – (Arabian) Monstrous flesh-eating spirits, jinn, or shayatin associated with graveyards.
- Gwisin – General term for a Korean ghost.
- Hibagon – The Japanese equivalent of Bigfoot.
- Hitotsume-kozou – A yōkai that takes on the appearance of a bald, one-eyed child.
- Jiangshi – A being in Chinese legends and folklore similar to zombie or vampire.
- Jinn – (Arabian) Genie-like beings.
- Jorōgumo – A spider that can change its appearance into that of a seductive woman.
- Kappa – A turtle-like trickster yōkai that is about the size of a child.
- Kinari – Beautiful, slender, and androgynous creatures with bird wings from Hindu and Buddhist mythology.
- Kitsune, huli jing, kumiho, and hồ ly tinh – Many-tailed fox spirits in Japanese, Chinese, Korean, and Vietnamese folklore respectively.
- Manananggal – A self-segmenting humanoid which preys on humans in Philippine folklore.
- Mandurugo – (Filipino) Harpy-like vampires with the body of birds of prey and the faces of beautiful women.
- Mangkukulam (kulam) – Tagalog for Filipino witch employing black magic or using hexes for revenge and punishment reasons.
- Nāga – Divine, or semi-divine, race of half-human, half-serpent beings that reside in the netherworld (Patala), and can occasionally take human or part-human form. Hinduism, Buddhism, and Jainism mythology.
- Nukekubi – Yōkai whose heads come off and float about.
- Nuno – Dwarf-like creature in Philippine mythology.
- Oni – (Japanese) Yōkai which are similar to ogres or demons.
- Pugot – (Philippines) Mythical fiend found in the Ilocos Region.
- Rannamaari - (Maldives) Sea monster/demon with similar mythology to Orochi.
- Rokurokubi – Yōkai with long necks or removable heads.
- Tengu – Legendary creatures with human and bird features in Japanese folklore.
- Tennin – Spiritual beings found in Japanese Buddhism that are similar to western angels, nymphs, or fairies.
- Tikbalang – (Filipino) Tall, bony creatures with the features of a horse.
- Tiyanak – Vampiric creature in Philippine mythology that imitates the form of a child.
- Vanara – Man-ape species with human intelligence in Hindu scriptures.
- Weretiger – Feline therianthropic creature, Asian version.
- Yama-uba – (Japanese) Monstrous crone with cannibalistic tendencies.
- Yeren – Legendary creature said to be an as yet undiscovered hominid residing in the remote mountainous forested regions of western Hubei, China.
- Yeti – An ape-like entity taller than an average human said to inhabit the Himalayan region of Nepal, Bhutan, and Tibet.
- Yuki-onna – Spirit or yōkai in Japanese folklore associated with snow.

== Europe ==
- Abarimon – Savage race of people with backwards feet.
- Ala – Female demon that brings bad weather to farms in Balkan folklore.
- Alp – Nightmare creature from Germanic Mythology.
- Anguane – (Germany, Austria) Female spirits with hooves and dangling breasts. Associated with aiding lost persons and in female fertility.
- Arkan sonney – Fairy creature resembling a pig in Manx folklore.
- Astomi – Legendary race of people who had no mouths and no need to eat or drink anything at all, surviving by smelling apples, flowers, and perfumes.
- Baba Yaga – Slavic witch, crone and liminal guardian to the Otherworld.
- Bannik – Slavic bathhouse spirit.
- Banshee – Female spirit in Irish folklore who heralds the death of a family member by screaming, shrieking, or keening.
- Basajaun, Basandere – (Basque) Hairy woodland spirit.
- Baumseele – (German) The personified spirits of sacred trees, which may or may not be elves. There are references in Scotland and England of recognizing sacred trees as "Tree Men," tasked to guard the realm, as well as using a similar tremann term in Scandinavia. It's difficult to know whether it's referring to elves, gods or a mix of both depending on the situation.
- Blafard – Albinos long surmised by Europeans to be the result of some kind of simian crossbreeding.
- Blemmyes (or akephaloi) – Legendary race of people with no heads and facial features on their chests.
- Bluecap – (English) Elf-like beings of the mines, who sometimes appear as a floating blue flame or an elf in a blue cap. Seen as derivation to Redcap.
- Boggart – Household spirits or genius loci.
- Boogeyman – A featureless, androgynous creature used by adults to frighten children into good behavior.
- Brownie – Scottish household spirit, performs tasks at night, independent, changeable.
- Bugbear – Type of hobgoblin comparable to the bogeyman.
- Centaur, Greek kentaurides – Men and women with the lower bodies of horses in Greek mythology.
- Changeling – Fae child left in place of a human child stolen by the fae.
- Clurichaun – Irish fairy resembling a leprechaun.
- Crone – Old woman who may be characterized as disagreeable, malicious, or sinister, often magical or supernatural, making her either helpful or not.
- Cyclops – Grotesque, one-eyed humanoids, sons of Uranus in Greek myth.
- Cynocephalus – Dog-headed humans.
- Demon – (Abrahamic religions) Malevolent beings associated with the devil in Christianity, often depicted in humanoid form.
- Dhampir – (Albanian, Slavic) Half human, half vampire, resulting from the mating of a male vampire and human woman exclusively.
- Dökkálfar – Dark elves in Nordic mythology.
- Domovoi – Protective house spirit in Slavic folklore.
- Doppelgänger – Look-alike or double of a living person.
- Drak – (German) Elf partly shapeshifted into a lizard. Likely represents the Hazel Worm as the protective spirit motif in German culture. A French version called a drac is said to be a type of lutin or French elf.
- Draugar – (Norse) Undead creatures that guard their burial mounds.
- Dryad – Tree nymph or tree spirit from Greek mythology.
- Dullahan – Irish fairy, the headless rider.
- Dwarf – (Germanic) Human-shaped being often dwelling in mountains and in the earth.
- Elf – Supernatural being in Germanic mythology and folklore.
- Empusa (or empousa, pl. empousai) – A shape-shifting being with a copper leg in Greek mythology.
- Erinyes – Greek female chthonic deities of vengeance.
- Fairy – Mythical spirits or legendary creatures in European folklore, also known as fae or fair folk among many other names. Commonly depicted as having beautiful insectoid wings.
- Faun – Humanoid beings with the horns and lower bodies of goats.
- Fetch – (Irish) An exact, spectral double of a living human; can appear as an omen.
- Fext – (Slavic) Undead warriors who can only be killed with bullets made of glass.
- Finmen – (Scottish) Mermaid-like beings from Orkney lore.
- Fomorians – (Irish) Army of monstrous troll-like/goblin-like humanoid beings.
- Furies – Greek goddesses of vengeance.
- Gargoyle – (French) Carved or formed grotesques said to scare away demons.
- German – (Slavic) A farm protective spirit. Mock burials of an effigy of it were held to summon rain or fair weather for their crops.
- Giant, giantess – Large beings of human appearance but prodigious size and strength.
- Gigantes – Race of great strength, aggression, and size in Greek and Roman mythology.
- Gnome – (Alchemy) Typically said to be a small humanoid that lives underground, bearded and wears a Phrygian cap.
- Goblin – (Medieval folklore) Small, grotesque humanoids.
- Golem – (Jewish) An artificial being of clay created by a Rabbi with a magic spell to defend his community.
- Gorgons – (Greek) Three monstrous sisters commonly depicted with snakes for hair and other beastly features. Two are immortal, Medusa was not. Anyone who looks at them directly turns into stone.
- Green Man – (English) Folklore figure resembling old man covered in foliage that is carved often in old churches. Possibly the same as the Scottish Ghillie Dhu.
- Gremlins – Grotesque humanoid creatures commonly depicted as mischievous and inclined to sabotage machinery.
- Hag – A kind of fairy or goddess appearing as wizened elderly woman, neither totally malevolent and sometimes benevolent.
- Haltija – A spirit, gnome, or elf-like creature in Finnish mythology that guards, helps, or protects something or somebody.
- Harpy – (Greek) Female creatures with bird wings.
- Hecatonchires – In Greek mythology, three sons of Uranus being hundred-handed giants with fifty heads.
- Hobgoblins – Mischievous household spirits.
- Hödekin – (German) Elf-like spirit who used to work for a bishop, but eventually came to do several horrific acts to the point that the bishop decided to exorcise him from his home.
- Hulder – Seductive forest creature found in Scandinavian folklore.
- Hyter sprites – (English) A lesser known type of fairy who disguise themselves as birds. Also, hikry, hyty, or hike.
- Imp – (Medieval folklore) A mischievous mythological being of small size, similar to a fairy or goblin.
- Iratxo – (Basque) Protective, elf-like spirit of farms. Given similar sculptures from Britain hiding secret phalluses, the Romans may have related it to the Greco-Roman God Priapus, who would threaten to rape thieves from farmers' fields.
- Jötunn (pl. jötnar) – A Norse mythological race that live in Jötunheimr.
- Kabouter – A tiny human-like creatures in Dutch folklore similar to the German kobold or Irish leprechaun.
- Kallikantzaroi – Malevolent goblin-like creatures in Southeast European folklore, believed to dwell underground but come to the surface during the twelve days of Christmas.
- Karnabo – An elephant-trunked humanoid in Ardennes folklore.
- Kikimora – Female house spirit in Slavic (especially Eastern) folklore.
- Kilmoulis (English) – Diminutive minster with no mouth and a giant nose that snorts all its food.
- Klabautermann (or Klabautermannikin, Kaboutermannikin) – A water kobold or nix in German folklore.
- Knocker (or knacker, tommyknocker) – Mischievous subterranean, gnome-like spirits associates with mines in Celtic folklore.
- Kobalos – An ancient Greek equivalent to a goblin.
- Kobold – Shapeshifting German spirits.
- Korrigan – Breton dwarves or fairies.
- Krsnik – Vampire hunter from Slavic Mythology.
- Lamia – (Greek) Beautiful, child-eating demon with a woman's upper body and a snake tail. In neighbouring Balkan cultures, the Bulgarian Lamya and Albanian Llamja are described as nature spirits similar to the Greek Lamia.
- Lamia (or lamina) – (Basque) Female water spirit with webbed bird feet.
- Lares – Guardian deities of ancient Rome.
- Leanan sídhe – Fairy-like being of Irish folklore.
- Lemures – (Roman) Restless spirits of the dead.
- Leprechaun – (Irish) Little bearded men dressed in green, associated with luck, gold at the end of a rainbow and wishes.
- Lidérc – (Hungarian) Some sort of shapeshifting monster created through magical means which latches onto a person, bestowing upon them riches, but slowly drains them of their lifeforce through sex and blood drinking until they die.
- Ljósálfar – Light elves in Nordic mythology.
- Lutin – A type of hobgoblin in French folklore and fairy tales. Female lutins are called lutines.
- Manticore – Creature with a man's head, a lion's body, bat wings, and a scorpion tail.
- Mauro, Maura (Portugal, Spain) – Class of humanoid beings that appear to relate to ancient Celtic culture, but are quite varied in abilities, appearance and function. Stories seem to random mix of gods, druids, ghosts, nature spirits and the occasional actual Moor invader from Africa.
- Mermaid, merman – Women and men with the lower bodies of fish.
- Minotaur – (Greek) A human with the head and sometimes legs of a bull.
- Moirai – Lesser trio of female deities assigned with deciding and weaving the fates of humans. Usually called the Fates, this is a pan-European concept, with the Roman Parcae, the Scandinavian Norns, Shakespeare's Weird Sisters, the Bulgarian Orisnizi, and Slavic Rozhanitsy easily identifiable.
- Monaciello – Little men dressed as monks.
- Monopod – One-legged mythical humanoids.
- Moss people
- Naiad – A type of water nymph.
- Nereid – Female water spirits of Greece.
- Nix – Germanic/Scandinavian shape-shifting water spirit. Also Neck, Necken, Nixie, Nocken.
- Nymph – (Greek) Female nature spirits.
- Oceanid – Sea nymphs, the daughters of Oceanus and Tethys.
- Ogre, ogress – (Medieval folklore) Large, grotesque humanoids.
- Orcs – (Tolkien) Humanoids with grey or green skin and tusks.
- Pixie – Benign fairy-like beings. Also called Peskie.
- Poltergeist – Ghosts known for causing physical disturbances.
- Púca (or pookha, puck) – (Irish) Mischievous shape-changing creatures which can take human form.
- Raedieguovlu – (Saami) Restless souls encountered in the wilderness. Place people who pay attention to them into trances, convincing them to wander off and die alone.
- Redcap – Malevolent, murderous dwarf, goblin, elf or fairy found in the folklore of the Anglo-Scottish border regions.
- Revenant – (French, English, Irish) Medieval walking corpses which escape their Graves and supernaturally invade homes to attack the living
- Roggenmuhme – (German) Female demon who is the mother of the Feldgeisters, light and dark elves who haunt the household and farmer's fields.
- Rusalka – Slavic water spirits.
- Sandman – Man who puts people to sleep and brings good dreams by sprinkling magical sand onto the eyes of sleeping humans.
- Satyr, satyress – Humanoid beings or nature spirits with goat-like features such as horns and hooves.
- Seelie – Scottish term meaning "happy" or "blessed", used in several fairy names.
- Selkie – Scottish mythical creature that resembles a seal in the water but assumes human form on land.
- Sidhe – Irish race of fae that make their homes in mounds.
- Siren – Beautiful yet dangerous creatures typically depicted as women-headed birds which lure sailors with their enchanting voices to shipwreck on rocky coasts.
- Slavic fairies – Supernatural beings in Slavic folklore.
- Sluagh – (Irish) Flying hosts of the unforgiven dead in Irish and Scottish folklore.
- Sphinx – (Egyptian-Greek) A creature with the body of a lion and the head of a human.
- Spriggan – A grotesquely ugly mischievous fairy or forest spirit from Cornish folklore.
- Sprite – Fairy, ghost, or elf-like creatures.
- Stallo – (Saami) Large, man-eating, dimwitted, humanoid monster.
- Struthopodes – Humanoids whose males had enormous feet, but whose females had tiny feet.
- Succubus, incubus – (Judeo-Christian folklore) Seductive demons.
- Svartalfar – Norse for "black elves".
- Sylph – (Alchemy) Mythological air spirit.
- Tantugou – (France/Andorra) Elderly hooded man who watches over land and animal holdings from predators and thieves. Sometimes also kidnaps bad children.
- Taraxippus – (Greek) ghosts of those whose deaths involved horses in some sort of upsetting way. Dedicated altars existed in chariot racing arenas for riders to make offerings, so the ghosts would not upset their horses or try to get them killed.
- Tartalo – (Basque) Cyclops-like figure.
- Titans – Anthropomorphic pre-Olympian gods in ancient Greek and Roman mythology.
- Tonttu – In Finnish mythology, a type of dwarf- or goblin-like creature associated with households and farms; associated with the winter solstice and the Christmas season.
- Troll – (Norse) Large, often grotesque humanoids.
- Trow – (Scottish) Short, ugly spirits.
- Tschäggättä – (Alps) Race of hairy monsters that allegedly descend from the arrival of Celts to the region, thousands of years ago.
- Undine – (Alchemy) Water nymph.
- Vættir – Nature spirits in Scandinavian folklore.
- Valkyrie – Female figure from Norse mythology, chooses who lives and who dies in battle.
- Vâlvă – (Romanian) A sort of female fairy or elf like being who are protective over certain resources. Homage is paid to them in return for favors and gifts, but disrespect of either themselves or said gifts leads to retaliation.
- Vampire – Being from Slavic folklore who subsists by feeding on the life essence of the living, generally in the form of blood.
- Vila – Slavic version of nymphs or fairies, with the power of the wind.
- Vioge – (English) Emaciated scarecrow-like monster from Jersey Isle. Grabs people, breaks their ankles and drags them home to eat.
- Weiße Frauen
- Werebear – Ursidae therianthropic creature.
- Werecat – Feline therianthropic creature western version.
- Werewolf – (Medieval folklore) Canine therianthropic creature.
- Wraith – (British) Evil spirit who is said to haunt people through negative emotions.
- Wulver – (Scottish) A type of dogman-like spirit from Scotland.
- Xana – Extraordinarily beautiful female creature in Asturian mythology.
- Zmeu – (Romanian) Dragon-human hybrid monsters. Can fly and breathe fire, but also use weapons and ride horses.

== Oceania/Polynesia ==
=== Australia ===
- Bunyip – Large, waterhole-dwelling creature.
- Junjudee – Small brown hairy man, roams the bush in South East Queensland; mischievous, even dangerous, impervious to weapons, strong.
- Mumari – Hairy creature that lives in the bush, an evil spirit, that follows a person home in the night and tries to catch them.
- Tall man – Malevolent being who comes out at night from cracks in the rocks or shadows of the rainforest in Queensland's North East tropics; nightmare creature, to be avoided at all costs, especially by Aboriginals.
- Yara-ma-yha-who – Vampire-like/dwarf/frog-like creature said to live in fig trees and attack its unexpected prey.
- Yowie – Hominid reputed to live in the Australian wilderness.

=== Hawaii ===
- Menehune – Small people who live in hidden Hawaiian valleys.
- Nawao – Savage humanoids.

=== New Zealand ===
- Maero – Savage, arboreal humanoids.
- Patupaiarehe – Pale-skinned fairy-like creatures.

=== Solomon Islands ===
- Kakamora – Small people living in forests, who sometimes stab people with their claws.

== Other ==
- Black-eyed children – Appear as human children with solid black eyes. Appear and beg entry into buildings or vehicles. If people relent, they begin to feel extremely ill.
- Ghost – A lost soul or spirit that can be good or evil. Ghosts are typically created by a dead person having been bound to this world by regrets or emotions like anger.
- Hat Man – A living shadow, often depicted with glowing red eyes and wearing a distinctive type of hat- usually a top hat or bowler cap.
- Homunculus – artificial diminutive humanlike being created through alchemy.
- Mummy – Deceased human or animal whose skin and organs have been preserved by mummification.
- Lich – A Necromancer who has become a powerful undead spellcaster

== See also ==
Related lists

- List of cryptids
- List of fictional apes
- List of hybrid creatures in mythology
- List of legendary creatures by type
