= Bacá (mythological creature) =

Mythological creature in Dominican folklore

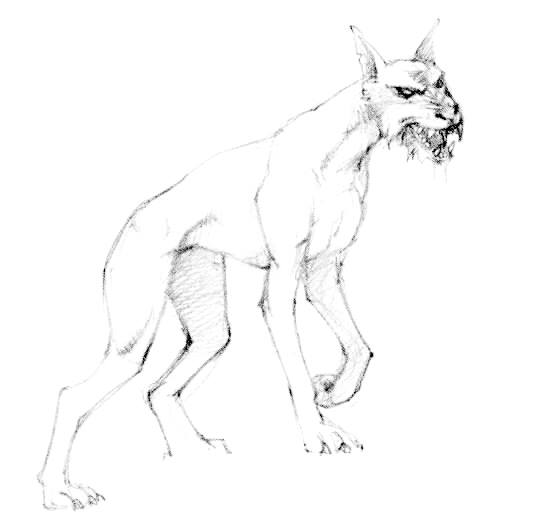
Artistic rendition of a bacá

A Bacá or Baká is shape-shifting demon in Dominican Republic folklore that is created when someone makes a deal with the devil. The Bacá is also known as a "sent spirit" and can transform into any animal, but is often depicted as a large dog or bull. The Bacá can grant its possessor wealth and protection, but demands large sacrifices in return.

== Description ==
The Bacá is a demonic animal familiar commonly described as a large black dog or bull, although folklore suggests they can take the form of other domestic animals—such as cats, pigs, or chickens. They are often described with burning or reddish eyes. The Bacá is often associated with southern rural regions of the Dominican Republic, where it represents anxieties around race, gender, money, and power.

== Types of pacts ==
According to folklore, the pact for the formation of these creatures requires a sacrifice of at least one soul, but there are differences in the number of souls or who they are, as it can be:

- In exchange for the soul of the firstborn of the person who makes the pact.
- In exchange for the soul of any child of the person making the pact.
- In exchange for the soul of the one who makes the pact.
- In exchange for a soul daily. Generally, those sacrificed are those who risk crossing the territory guarded by the bacá or baká after certain hours at night (folklore speaks of 12am, sunset and 3am). If the bacá has not managed to 'feed' before the sun rises, he will take a soul from someone of lesser value in the territory: He will start with the employees (if there are any), continuing with the children, until eventually 'feeding' from his 'master' (the covenant maker).

== Inheritance ==
In some versions of the tales it is possible to inherit a bacá:

- In the event of the death of the owner (and not of his children), the bacá will pass to the eldest son.
- In the event of the death of the owner (and his children), the inheritance will pass to the closest relative.
- In the event of the death of the owner (and his children), the bacá will pass to the next owner of the land, whether this owner is by family inheritance or by purchase.

== Conditions ==
The bacá cannot go out while the sun is up, nor can he leave the land unless he is exorcised by a professional priest (i.e. exorcising the land during the day).

== See also ==
- Baccoo
- Galipote
- Folklore of the Dominican Republic

== Sources ==
- "criaturas mitológicas".
