= Back-footed being =

Folkloristic motif

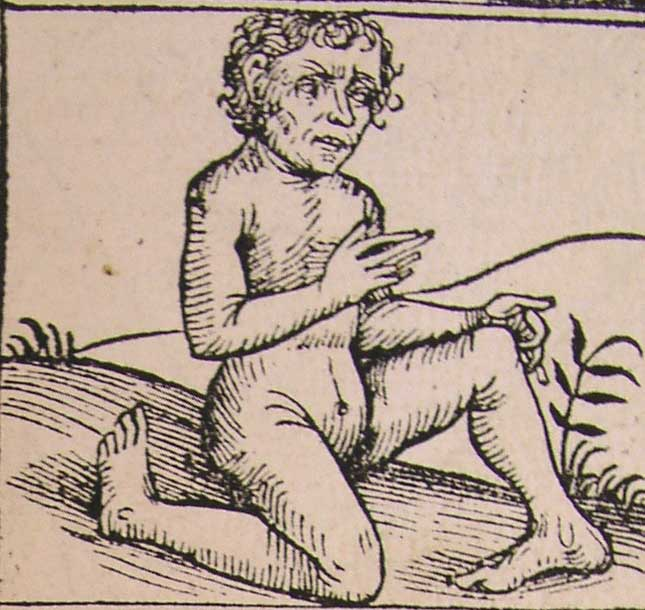
A nuli, from the Nuremberg Chronicle, 1493

A back-footed being is a category of legendary creature that has backwards-facing feet or legs, from having clubfoot to being fully backward. A folkloric motif, back-footed beings are common across the world's folklore, particularly in Latin American folklore.

== Prevalence ==
Back-footed beings are largely mythic humanoids. Back-footed beings are part of folklore traditions through the Americas and Afro-Eurasia. Ancient Greek historian Megasthenes wrote of back-footed "Nuli" in India in the 4th century BCE. The motif of back-footed beings as identified in the Motif-Index of Folk-Literature includes backwards feet, backwards toes, and those that can temporarily reverse their legs and feet.

The origin of stories of back-footed beings, particularly cryptids, may come from the mis-identification of animal tracks.

== Folkloristics ==
French folklore scholar Henri Gaidoz in the late 19th century noted the preponderance of back-footed beings in folklore worldwide in a set of articles in the journal Mélusine. Gaidoz framed back-footedness as the expression of a base human belief that physical disabilities were malevolent, hence many back-footed beings are antagonistic in their stories. A.T. Crawford Cree in 1905 rejected Gaidoz' claim, pointing to benevolent back-footed beings like Cú Chulainn, Hephaestus, and Leabharcham. Cree instead conjectured that back-footed beings stem from theriomorphism - humanoid gods with animal features - and particularly from avian humanoid ("ornithomorphic spirit") legends; he claimed that backwards legs evoke avian qualities in a "less violent combination" compared to winged humanoids.

Cultural anthropologist Ramón Sarró wrote in 2008 that back-footed beings evoke digitigrade legs of animals, while retaining other human qualities, making the back-footed being distinct from both human and animal. Slovenian folklorist Monika Kropej in 2015 identified back-footed beings as an example of the "backwards" fairy-like creatures of the Otherworld, comparable to other folkloric beings with backwards body features. Slovenian folklorist Barbara Ivančič Kutin wrote in Folklore in 2018 that "Depictions of creatures with backward-pointing feet can, given the fact that they extend across many different parts of the world, essentially be regarded as archetypal."

== List of back-footed beings ==
Name	Country of origin	Continent	Notes	Ref
Abarimon	India	Asia (South Asia)	Attested to by Pliny the Elder	
Chirionossos		South America	Mythical tribe	
Chinigua	Margarita, Venezuela	North America (Caribbean)		
Churel	India	Asia (South Asia)		
Ciguapa	Dominican Republic	North America (Caribbean)		
Cú Chulainn	Ireland	Europe (British Isles)	Temporary transformation, while fighting	
Curupira	Brazil	South America		
The Devil		Europe	Sometimes described with backwards knees	
Douen	throughout	North America (Caribbean)		
Hephaestus	Greece	Europe	Typically clubfoot, sometimes depicted with backward feet	
Krivopeta	Slovenia	Europe		
Leabharcham	Ireland	Europe (British Isles)	Temporary transformation, granting running prowess	
Masisikiri	Venezuela	South America		
Mapinguari	Brazil	South America	A man-eating cryptid creature with hook-shaped nails and backwards-facing feet	
Nuli	India	Asia (South Asia)	Attested to by Megasthenes	
Orang Pendek	Indonesia	Asia (Southeast Asia)		
Siguanaba	Guatemala	North America (Central America)		
Sisimito	Guatemala	North America (Central America)		
Xəlvəlik	Armenia	Asia (West Asia)	Demon that does everything backwards, with backwards feet	
Yeti	Himalayas	Asia		
