= A Centaur's Life =

Japanese manga series

- Cover of the first Japanese volume

セントールの悩み (Sentōru no Nayami)
- Genre: Slice of life, comedy, supernatural
- Manga
- Written by: Kei Murayama
- Published by: Tokuma Shoten
- English publisher: Seven Seas Entertainment
- Magazine: Monthly Comic Ryū
- Original run: February 2011 – present
- Volumes: 26
- Anime television series
- Directed by: Fumitoshi Oizaki (chief); Naoyuki Konno
- Produced by: Naruhito Yamazaki; Hiroshi Akio; Natsuko Kawasaki; Yutaka Gotō; Takahiro Ishiyama; Shinji Tadokoro; Atsushi Yoshikawa; Atsushi Aitani
- Written by: Touko Machida
- Music by: MAGES
- Studio: Emon
- Licensed by: Crunchyroll
- Original network: Tokyo MX, AT-X, BS11
- Original run: July 9, 2017 – September 24, 2017
- Episodes: 12
- icon

A Centaur's Life, known in Japan as Centaur's Worries (Japanese: セントールの悩み, Hepburn: Sentōru no Nayami), is a Japanese slice of life comedy manga series by Kei Murayama. The series has been serialized in Tokuma Shoten's Monthly Comic Ryū magazine since February 2011, and is published in English by Seven Seas Entertainment. An anime television series adaptation by Emon aired in Japan from July to September 2017.

== Plot ==
The series takes place in a world that took a different path of evolution from the world we know resulting in mythological creatures, such as centaurs, satyrs, mermaids, and demons, taking the place of humans in today's society. The story largely focuses around a centaur girl named Himeno Kimihara as she goes about her daily life with her friends and family.

== Characters ==
Himeno Kimihara (君原 姫乃, Kimihara Himeno)
Voiced by: Seria Fukagawa (Japanese); Kristin Sutton (English)
A centaur girl with a gentle personality. She is at an age where she is anxious about the size of her chest and body. Himeno is informally called "hime" (Japanese for "princess") by her friends.
Nozomi Gokuraku (獄楽 希, Gokuraku Nozomi)
Voiced by: Yūki Kuwahara (Japanese); Alex Moore (English)
A demon girl who is a friend of Himeno and lives in a karate dojo. She has a rough personality and is often teased for her boyish appearance.
Kyouko Naraku (名楽 羌子, Naraku Kyōko)
Voiced by: Haruka Shiraishi (Japanese); Steph Garrett (English)
A half-Satyress who is another friend of Himeno. She is cool and composed. She is just like her older brother.
Manami Mitama (御魂 真奈美, Mitama Manami)
Voiced by: Yuna Kamakura (Japanese); Rachael Messer (English)
An angel girl. She naturally has the disposition of a committee chairman. She looks after her four younger sisters; her mother is not around and her father tries to find success as an artist.
Mitsuyo Akechi (朱池 美津代, Akechi Mitsuyo)
Voiced by: Emi Miyajima (Japanese); Caitlin Glass (English)
A ram-horned girl who has a cheeky personality. She is a lesbian who is in a relationship with Inukai, but enjoys teasing other girls too.
Inukai Michiru (犬養 未散, Inukai Michiru)
Voiced by: Honoka Kuroki (Japanese); Tia Ballard (English)
An Unicorn horned girl and Mitsuyo's girlfriend.
Makoto Komori (小守 真, Komori Makoto)
Voiced by: Takaki Ootamari (Japanese); Philip Annarella (English)
A perverted demon boy who lusts after Himeno.
Chidori Hyappo (百歩 千鳥, Hyappo Chidori)
Voiced by: Daisuke Oohashi (Japanese); Derick Snow (English)
A shy angel boy and the assistant to Manami.
Yutaka Nekomi (猫見 豊, Nekomi Yutaka)
Voiced by: Yomoya Yano (Japanese); Cris George (English)
A cat boy and friend to Komori.
Kousaku Fujimoto (藤本 公作, Fujimoto Kōsaku)
Voiced by: Takahiro Miwa (Japanese); Dave Trosko (English)
A Satyr student.
Quetzalcoatl Sassassul (ケツァルコアトル・サスサススール, Ketsarukoatoru Sasusasusūru)
Voiced by: Yuu Ayase (Japanese); Jad Saxton (English)
A foreign exchange student from Antarctica who resembles a snake. Since her race has a logical way of thinking, she feels like an alien within Japanese culture. Though Quetzalcoatl is gentle, friendly, and adaptable.
Shino (紫乃)
Voiced by: Akane Kiryū (Japanese); Marla Acevedo (English)
A centaur and Himeno's cousin who is in kindergarten. She loves Himeno very much.
Miura (美浦)
Voiced by: Ayaka Imamura (Japanese); Kristy Sims (English)
A mermaid who is in 14th Aquatic High.
Chigusa Mitama (御魂 ちぐさ, Mitama Chigusa) , Chinami Mitama (御魂 智奈美, Mitama Chinami) and Chiho Mitama (御魂 千穂, Mitama Chiho)
(Chigusa, Chinami, Chiho) Voiced by: Atsumi Tanezaki (Japanese); Tabitha Ray (English)
Mostly known as the Chi-chans-(ちち-ゃん) are Manami's identical triplet younger sisters and the older sisters of Sue. They each have light orange hair-(in different hairstyles) along with cat ears and a tail like their father. While their personalities are extremely similar, they can be told apart by their hairstyles; Chigusa has her hair kept in twin braids, Chinami has her hair up in a ponytail, and Chiho's hair is in a bob-cut.
Sue Mitama (御魂 未摘, Mitama Sue)
Voiced by: Mei Kanna (Japanese); Didi Duron (English)
The youngest sister of the Mitama siblings. She is a rare mix of an angel and a cat, however she suffers from a strange disease that is associated with it; she has white hair just like her older sister and mother. Despite her weak and fragile appearance, she is always a happy and playful child. Unlike her older sisters she is quiet, sensitive, and soft-spoken. She refers to all of her sisters as "nē-nē" (ネネ).
Riri (リリ)
Voiced by: Yurika Kubo (Japanese); Jo Lorio (English)
A friend and next-door neighbor of the youngest Mitama siblings. She has a six-legged dog named Yoshi.
Mii (ミー)
Voiced by: Erika Ishitobi (Japanese); Sarah Wiedenheft (English)
A friend and classmate of Shino from kindergarten.
Maki (マキ)
Voiced by: Momo Asakura (Japanese); Dawn M. Bennett (English)
A friend and classmate of Shino from kindergarten.
Rino Kimihara (君原 理乃, Kimihara Rino)
Voiced by: Asami Seto (Japanese); Janelle Lutz (English)
Himeno's mother and Shino's aunt.
Souta Kimihara (君原 蒼太, Kimihara Sōta)
Voiced by: Kenji Hamada (Japanese); Ben Phillips (English)
Himeno's father and Shino's uncle.

== Media ==
=== Manga ===
The original manga illustrated by Kei Murayama began serialization in Tokuma Shoten's Monthly Comic Ryū from February 2011. Twenty-six tankōbon volumes have been released as of September 12, 2025. The series moved to online-only serialization when Comic Ryū changed formats on June 19, 2018. The series is licensed in English by Seven Seas Entertainment, who began releasing it in North America from November 5, 2013.

==== Volume list ====
No.	Original release date	Original ISBN	English release date	English ISBN
1	November 30, 2011	978-4-19-950274-3	November 5, 2013	978-1-937867-91-1
2	February 13, 2012	978-4-19-950287-3	February 2, 2014	978-1-626920-00-2
3	September 13, 2012	978-4-19-950305-4	June 3, 2014	978-1-626920-33-0
4	February 13, 2013	978-4-19-950325-2	September 2, 2014	978-1-626920-48-4
5	June 13, 2013	978-4-19-950345-0	February 3, 2015	978-1-626921-11-5
6	November 13, 2013	978-4-19-950363-4	July 7, 2015	978-1-626921-35-1
7	March 13, 2014	978-4-19-950389-4	November 3, 2015	978-1-626922-09-9
8	July 11, 2014	978-4-19-950404-4	March 29, 2016	978-1-626922-36-5
9	December 13, 2014	978-4-19-950424-2	July 5, 2016	978-1-626922-83-9
10	May 13, 2015	978-4-19-950452-5	November 8, 2016	978-1-626923-51-5
11	October 13, 2015	978-4-19-950475-4	March 21, 2017	978-1-626924-46-8
12	March 12, 2016	978-4-19-950499-0	August 22, 2017	978-1-626925-09-0
13	July 13, 2016	978-4-19-950519-5	December 12, 2017	978-1-626925-88-5
14	December 13, 2016	978-4-19-950541-6	April 3, 2018	978-1-626927-18-6
15	July 13, 2017	978-4-19-950577-5	September 25, 2018	978-1-626928-93-0
16	December 13, 2017	978-4-19-950602-4	March 26, 2019	978-1-642750-04-1
17	September 13, 2018	978-4-19-950647-5	September 3, 2019	978-1-642756-89-0
18	March 13, 2019	978-4-19-950672-7	June 2, 2020 (digital); August 25, 2020 (physical)	978-1-64505-471-9
19	November 13, 2019	978-4-19-950692-5	January 19, 2021	978-1-64505-828-1
20	July 13, 2020	978-4-19-950710-6	November 2, 2021	978-1-64827-330-8
21	March 13, 2021	978-4-19-950732-8	August 16, 2022	978-1-64827-575-3
22	October 13, 2021	978-4-19-950758-8	—	978-1-63858-654-8
23	April 13, 2022	978-4-19-950776-2	—	—
24	June 13, 2023	978-4-19-950817-2	—	—
25	February 13, 2024	978-4-19-950843-1	—	—
26	September 12, 2025	978-4-19-950923-0	—	—

=== Anime ===
An anime adaptation was announced on the wraparound of the manga's 14th volume, released on December 13, 2016, later revealed to be a television series. It is animated by Haoliners Animation League's Japanese branch Emon and directed by Naoyuki Konno, with Fumitoshi Oizaki credited as the chief director and Touko Machida is the series composition. The character design is done by Sakae Shibuya, who is also a chief animation director. The twelve-episode series aired on Tokyo MX between July 9 and September 24, 2017. The opening theme is "Oshiete Darwin" (教えてダーウィン, Oshiete Dāwin; "Tell me, Darwin") by Purely Monster, while the ending theme is "Edelweiss" by Asaka. Crunchyroll streamed the series, and Funimation dubbed it and released it on home video as part of the two companies' partnership.

==== Episode list ====
No.	Title (Note: All English titles are taken from Crunchyroll.)	Original release date
1	"When All Is Said And Done, Everyone Loves Kisses."; Transliteration: "Nandakanda de, Minna, Kisu tte Daisuki da yo ne" (Japanese: なんだかんだで、みんな、キスって大好きだよね)	July 9, 2017
1	"Did You Know That a Marathon Is a Microcosm of Life?"; Transliteration: "Marason tte Jinsei no Shukuzu datte, Shitteta?" (Japanese: マラソンって人生の縮図だって、知ってた?)	July 9, 2017
While preparing for a class play, centaur Himeno Kimihara, who is playing the princess, ends up kissing her demon friend Nozomi Gokuraku after a male classmate who had originally hoped to play the prince role modified her script. During the play, a set of steps collapses beneath Himeno and Nozomi, forcing Himeno to make a daring rescue to save Nozomi. Later, during marathon practise, Nozomi and their half-Satyr friend Kyouko Naraku test how fast Himeno can run, which almost results in an accident.
2	"Beauty Is a Double-Edged Sword."; Transliteration: "Utsukushi-sa tte, Moroha no Yaiba nano deatta" (Japanese: 美しさって、諸刃の刃ナノであった。)	July 16, 2017
2	"Water People Living in Water and Mountain People Living in Mountains Really Are Just That."; Transliteration: "Mizu ni Ikiru Mizu no Hito, Riku ni Ikiru Yama no Hito tte Manma jan." (Japanese: 水に生きる水人、陸に生きる山人ってまんまじゃん。)	July 16, 2017
After finding Himeno modelling in a fashion magazine, Nozomi is roped into trying out some different fashions by Mitsuyo Akechi and her girlfriend Inukai after they hint Himeno might get expelled for having a part-time job. She later learns, however, that Himeno's modelling work was simply an unpaid favor for her mother's friend, while Mitsuyo was secretly working at a part-time job the whole time. On a cold day, Himeno and friends try to warm themselves up by thinking back to when their class went to a school for merfolk to attend their classes.
3	"Where Do the Little Ones Get So Much Vitality?"; Transliteration: "Chīsana Ko no Ano Baitariti wa Dokokara Kuru no?" (Japanese: 小さい子のあのバイタリティは何処からくるの？)	July 23, 2017
3	"Regardless of the Generation, Magical Girls Are Popular, Huh?"; Transliteration: "Jidai ya Nendai o Towazu, Mahō Shōjo tte Ninki Aru yo ne." (Japanese: 時代や年代を問わず、魔法少女って人気あるよね。)	July 23, 2017
Himeno goes out with her cousin Shino and comes across student council president Manami Mitama and her three triplet sisters, Chiho, Chinami, and Chigusa. Shino gets defensive about how the triplets go about kissing others, which isn't helped when Mitsuyo and Inukai provide their own input on the matter. Later, the triplets are tasked with looking after their youngest sister Sue while Manami is out doing student council work. Sue becomes too weak to play outdoor games with the triplets' friends, but she manages to play house with someone, which they later discover might have been a zashiki-warashi.
4	"Why Are We So Bewildered When We Receive a Love Letter?"; Transliteration: "Rabu Retā o Moratte Konwakusuru... Sono Kokoro wa?" (Japanese: ラブレターをもらって困惑する...その心は？)	July 30, 2017
4	"You Can Tell What Type a Person Is By Whether They Believe in UMAs and UFOs or Not."; Transliteration: "Yūfō, Yūma no Tagui o Shinjiru ka Shinjinai ka de, Taipu ga Wakareru yo ne" (Japanese: UFO、UMAの類を信じるか信じないかでタイプが分かれるよね。)	July 30, 2017
After being approached by a boy with a love letter, Himeno is reluctant to accept it because she is worried about how her horse half would look naked. Hearing about her complex, Nozomi and Kyouko propose that they look at each other's private parts to put Himeno at ease. After being assured that she is perfectly normal, Himeno accepts the love letter only to find the boy was only interested in her for her breasts. Later, Himeno and Kyouko try to help Nozomi study for her make-up exams, during which Nozomi believes she sees a UFO. The next day, Himeno's class receives a new transfer student; an Antarctican snake girl named Quetzalcoatl Sassassul.
5	"Antarcticans Are Like Walking Rumors."; Transliteration: "Nankyokujin tte Uwasa ga Hitori Aruki Shiteru mitai" (Japanese: 南極人って噂がー人歩きしてるみたい。)	August 6, 2017
5	"But In the End, The Antarcticans' History and Roots Are a Mystery, Too."; Transliteration: "Demo, Nankyokujin tte Rekishi mo Rūtsu mo Nazo da yo ne" (Japanese: でも、南極人って歴史もルーツも謎だよね。)	August 6, 2017
Himeno feels intimidated by Sassassul because of a scary B-movie she saw about snake people as a child. After hearing about this, Sassassul requests to watch the movie in question with Himeno, assuring her that her species is nothing like the monster featured in the movie and managing to become friends with everyone. Later, Sassassul clears up the misunderstandings and rumors surrounding Antarcticans with her classmates. Afterwards, Sassassul, feeling unnerved following a news report of an alleged Antarctican UFO attack, joins Himeno and the others as they go clothes shopping.
6	"Is Being Able to Retrace One's Past and Ancestors A Reason to Be Happy or Unhappy?"; Transliteration: "Senzo ya Rekishi no Koto o Sakanoboreru no wa, Mushiro Kōfuku? Soretomo Fukō?" (Japanese: 先祖や歴史のことを遡れるのは、むしろ幸福？それとも不幸？)	August 13, 2017
6	"Does Getting a Job Doing What You Love Really Bring Happiness?"; Transliteration: "Hontō ni Suki na Koto o Shigoto ni suru Koto wa Hatashite Shiawase nano ka na?" (Japanese: 本当に好きなことを仕事にすることは果たして幸せなのかな？)	August 13, 2017
As the girls discuss what kind of hairstyle would suit Himeno, she explains how her ancestry led her to have red hair. Meanwhile, Kyouko acts as a secretary for her manga artist father while Manami is sent to deal with an allegedly cursed box before criticising her father for being stuck between being a good father and being a painter.
7	"First Experiences Are Scary and Fun All in One... Pardon the Rhyme."; Transliteration: "Hajimete no Keiken tte Kyōfu to Kyōmi ga Kyōzon... Raimu dakedo ne." (Japanese: 初めての経験って恐怖と興味が共存...ライムだけどね。)	August 20, 2017
7	"Occult Movies You Watch as a Kid Are 140% Scarier."; Transliteration: "Osanai Koro ni Mita Okaruto Eiga no Kyōfu wa Hyaku-yon-jū-Pāsento Mashi da yo ne." (Japanese: 幼い頃に観たオカルト映画の恐怖は140%増しだよね。)	August 20, 2017
The girls all go to the pool, where Sassassul overcomes her fear of water and understands more about Manami's sisters. Later, the girls help the Occult Club hold a night of telling scary stories to help the president, Towako, get along better with everyone, though the subject quickly switches to science.
8	"Mental Strength Might Be the Biggest Reason One Wins a Serious Competition."; Transliteration: "Shinken Shōbu tte Mentaru no Tsuyosa ga Ichiban no Shōinna no Kamo Shirenai." (Japanese: 真剣勝負ってメンタルの強さが一番の勝因なのかもしれない。)	August 27, 2017
8	"The Uncertainty of What One Believes In... Or So I Absurdly Mumble."; Transliteration: "Shinjiru Mono no Fukakutei satte... Nante Fujōri ni Tsubuyaitari shite." (Japanese: 信じるものの不確定さって...なんて不条理に呟いたりして。)	August 27, 2017
Himeno goes to an archery meet with her underclassman, Ayaka Wakamaki, who acts strict towards her. Following some advice on her friends, Himeno helps Ayaka to loosen up by offering to go on a date with her. Later, the mermaid school holds a festival in which one of the mermaids has to perform a song to appease the god Tagon. The festival is interrupted, however, when a large fish monster posing as Tagon appears.
9	"What Are the Struggles of Someone Known as a Prominent Figure?"; Transliteration: "Seken de Ijin tte Iwareteiru Hito no Kunō tte." (Japanese: 世間で偉人って言われている人の苦悩って。)	September 3, 2017
9	"What Is the Life of Someone Known as a Prominent Figure Like?"; Transliteration: "Seken de Ijin tte Iwareteiru Hito no Jinsei tte." (Japanese: 世間で偉人って言われている人の人生って。)	September 3, 2017
Himeno and the others are chosen as a preparatory committee for Jean Rousseau, a French-raised amphibian businessman who is scheduled to give a speech at their school. While visiting his homeland prior to his speech, Jean is concerned by his people's willingness to rage war against mammal-based lifeforms. Many years ago, a young angel boy is captured and forced to work in an internment camp. As the boy becomes weaker and filled with despair, he is given food by a centaur who is regarded as a traitor among his fellow prisoners, convinced that those with good hearts need to survive. Just as the federation army raids the camp to rescue the prisoner, the boy finds the centaur hung by the other prisoners, who attempt to kill him as well before he is rescued by a kind soldier. This allowed him to grow up into a kind-hearted politician who is accepting of all races.
10	"When You Choose to Look at Contemporary Art For a Date... Part 1"; Transliteration: "Dēto ni Gendai Bijutsu Kanshō o Eranda Baai... Sono 1." (Japanese: デートに現代美術鑑賞を選んだ場合...その1。)	September 10, 2017
10	"When You Choose to Look at Contemporary Art For a Date... Part 2"; Transliteration: "Dēto ni Gendai Bijutsu Kanshō o Eranda Baai... Sono 2." (Japanese: デートに現代美術鑑賞を選んだ場合...その2。)	September 10, 2017
Hime, Nozomi, and Kyouko decide to tail after Sassassul as she goes on a supposed date with a boy to a contemporary art museum, unaware that various organisations are keeping an eye on her too. At the same time, Manami goes on a date to the same museum with her boyish classmate Makoto Omaki, getting into a conversation about her father's art career.
11	"There Are As Many Names of Flowers... As There Are People, But That's Totally a Lie!"; Transliteration: "Hana no Namae wa... ... Hito no Kazu dake Arunda yo, tte Kitto Uso!" (Japanese: 花の名前は......は人の数だけあるんだよ、ってきっと嘘！)	September 17, 2017
11	"There Are As Many Types of Beauty As There Are People, Which Is Probably True If Used in a Broad Sense?"; Transliteration: "Utsukushi-sa wa Hito no Kazu dake Arunda yo, Kōgi de Ieba Kitto Hontō?" (Japanese: 美しさは人の数だけあるんだよ、広義で言えばきっと本当？)	September 17, 2017
After learning about different types of grass and flower from Himeno, Shino attempts to explain the concept to her classmates at kindergarten. Meanwhile, the Chi sisters teach Sue how to use her tail before seeing if they can find someone more beautiful than Manami.
12	"We Tried Making a Fantasy Story in RPG Style."; Transliteration: "Fantajī o RPG Kibun de Tsukutta Mita." (Japanese: ファンタジーをRPG気分で作ってみた。)	September 24, 2017
12	"Fierce Fights! Arm Wrestling! How Will the Battle of the Heroines End?"; Transliteration: "Gekitō! Udezumō! Onna (Hiroin) Darake no Shōbu no Yukue wa" (Japanese: 激闘！ 腕相撲！ 女(ヒロイン)だらけの勝負の行方は)	September 24, 2017
The girls participate in an RPG fantasy setting, fighting against monsters in a dungeon labyrinth, which turns out to be a story written by Mitsuyo. Later, the class holds an arm wrestling tournament for some unexplained reason, culminating in a final match between Himeno and Manami, with Himeno proving victorious.

== Reception ==
On Anime News Network, Rebecca Silverman gave volume 1 an overall grade of B−.

== See also ==
- Human-animal Hybrid
