= Astomi =

Tribe in Greek mythology

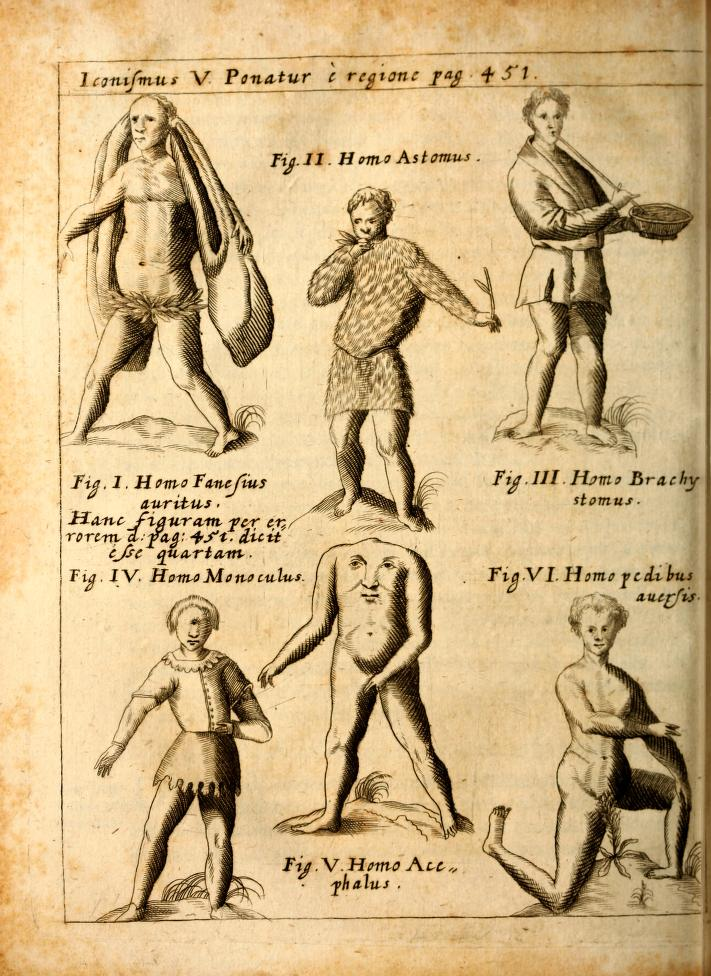
Panotti, astomi, brachistomi, cyclops, blemmyes and abarimon.

In Greek and Roman mythology, the Astomi, also known as the Gangines, were a race of people who had no need to eat or drink, surviving by smelling apples, flowers, and perfumes that they sprayed on their victims.

Megasthenes and Pliny the Elder (quoting Megasthenes) mentioned these people in his Indica. Megasthenes located them at the source of the river Ganges. In his description, they had rough and hairy bodies and no mouths. When traveling, they would carry roots, flowers and apples to smell. They could die by smelling a strong, unpleasant smell.
