= Folklore of the Dominican Republic =

Popular tales and legends from the Dominican Republic

Folklore of the Dominican Republic analyses the cultural phenomena of the Dominican Republic going back to the period of colonization, when Christopher Columbus set foot on land and the aborigines were already on the island. From that moment on, a process of rational relations between the two began. From the beginning, these relations were conflictive, and led to the disappearance of the first settlers of the Island of Santo Domingo (as it used to be called). Later, the Spanish inhabitants of the island brought African slaves, giving rise to yet another mixture of customs and ethnicities.

== Etymology ==
In the Dominican Republic, the word folklore (Folclore for Spanish) appeared for the first time on February 10, 1884, nearly several decades after its independence from Haiti. (Interestingly, the word had also appeared 38 years after it appeared in Europe, when it was used by William John Thoms on August 22, 1846). It was used for the first time in a newspaper in Santiago de los Caballeros, called El Eco del Pueblo, in a letter sent by a person known only by the name Valle de Gracia. Afterwards, other people continued to use it, until it gained prominence in both Dominican literature and Dominican culture.

== Carnivals ==
The Dominican Carnival has its roots in colonial times. Some historians believe that the first Carnival celebrations came with the visit of Fray Bartolomé de las Casas, when the inhabitants dressed up as Moors and Christians. Over time, the Carnival evolved and merged with African traditions, creating a unique celebration that is characteristic of Dominican culture. After Dominican independence on February 27, 1844, the month of February was established as the Dominican Carnival month.

== Mythology, urban legends and beliefs ==
Mythical figures in Dominican culture include Ciguapa, Jupías, Biembienes, Galipote, Bacá, Marimantas, and the Cuco.

The earliest Urban legend is of the Tapao, a faceless man from the 16th-century who was said to have once been an inhabitant of the Coloinial City. The story of El Negro Comegente, remains one of the darkest urban legends in the Dominican Republic. Other legends include Brujas and Botija.

== Folk heroes ==
Throughout the historical development of the Dominican Republic in its struggles for independence, equality, and political reforms, many figures have been highlighted for having taken part in these struggles and even recognized as folk heroes. Such examples include:

- Enriquillo - Taíno chief who rebelled against Spanish colonists
- Caonabo - Taino cacique executed by the Spanish colonists
- Sebastián Lemba - African rebel who went down in history for leading the first Maroon rebellion in the Americas
- Juan Pablo Duarte - revolutionary leader and Father of the Nation
- Desiderio Arias - leader in the civil wars of 1911 and 1914
- Olivorio Mateo - activist and spiritual leader who opposed the U.S occupation of the Dominican Republic
- Francisco Caamaño - leader in the April Revolution
- Mamá Tingó - activist and revolutionary

== See also ==
- Culture of the Dominican Republic
- Religion in the Dominican Republic
- Music of the Dominican Republic
- History of the Dominican Republic
- Literature of the Dominican Republic
