= Centauress and Faun =

Bronze sculpture in Lyon, France

- Centauresse et Faune (French)
- The sculpture as seen in 2025
- Artist: Augustin Courtet
- Year: 1849 (model), 1850 (bronze)
- Medium: Bronze sculpture
- Dimensions: 2.13 m × 2.10 m (7.0 ft × 6.9 ft)
- Location: Parc de la Tête d'or, Lyon, France; 45.7774°N 4.8457°E
- Owner: French Republic

Centauress and Faun (French: Centauresse et Faune) (Note: Also sometimes called La Centauresse et le faune and Centauresse enlevant un faune. The capitalization of "Faune" is inconsistent across sources.) is a bronze sculpture created by Augustin Courtet in 1849 as a model and subsequently cast by Parisian founder Quesnel in 1850. It is currently located in front of the Porte des Enfants du Rhône, the main entrance of the Parc de la Tête d'or in Lyon, France.

The full-size artwork depicts a female centaur carrying a humanoid male faun away on her back. It also includes a variety of bacchic elements such as grapes and cups, as well as a small leopard. The sculpture is named, signed and dated on its base.

The sculpture was exhibited twice at the Paris Salon, first as the plaster model, and then as the final bronze. This led to its assessment by art critics from various periodicals of the time. It generally garnered praise for its technical execution; however, the subject of the group proved controversial because of the then-unusual inversion of the motif involving a male centaur carrying away a nymph.

== Description ==
The bronze sculpture itself is 2.13 m (7.0 ft) high. It stands on a stadium-shaped stone pedestal that is 2.10 m (6.9 ft) wide with a 4 m (13 ft) circumference. The sculpture is said to be in the round (what is called ronde-bosse in French), in opposition to a relief. As such, it is meant to be observable from all sides, without compromising perspective.

At the core of the group is a centauress. She is depicted with the anatomy of a young woman from head to waist, and then with the body of a horse starting from the neck downwards, with an ivy garland around the transition. Rearing, only her back-left hoof is touching the ground. A long drape carried by her right arm falls on both flanks, touching ground below her. Holding a wine cup in her left hand, she is gently supporting the head of the faun with the other, bringing him close enough to kiss. The faun himself is depicted as a young man. His naked body is thrown back across the horse's back, as if he were just being carried away from the ground, the right leg folded over the croup and the other one hanging down. He is leaning on the horse's loins with his left hand, while his right arm is thrown into an embrace around the neck of the centauress. (Note: As seen in the photographs.)

In addition to the aforementioned ivy garland, many objects commonly associated with bacchic symbolism are scattered below and around the centauress, such as grapes, pampres, and cups. There is also a young leopard that, frightened by the rearing, spills an amphora full of wine by jumping on it. Centaurs have most often been depicted as male. The theme of the artwork takes a stance opposed to the traditional motif of the male centaur carrying away a nymph, often by force. Here, a centauress is depicted carrying away a faun, who seems to be eager to follow of his own will.

== History ==
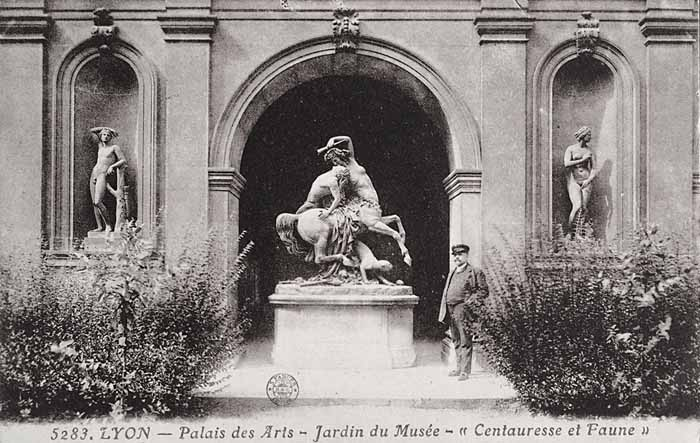
A postcard showing the sculpture in the Jardin du Palais Saint-Pierre, its original location

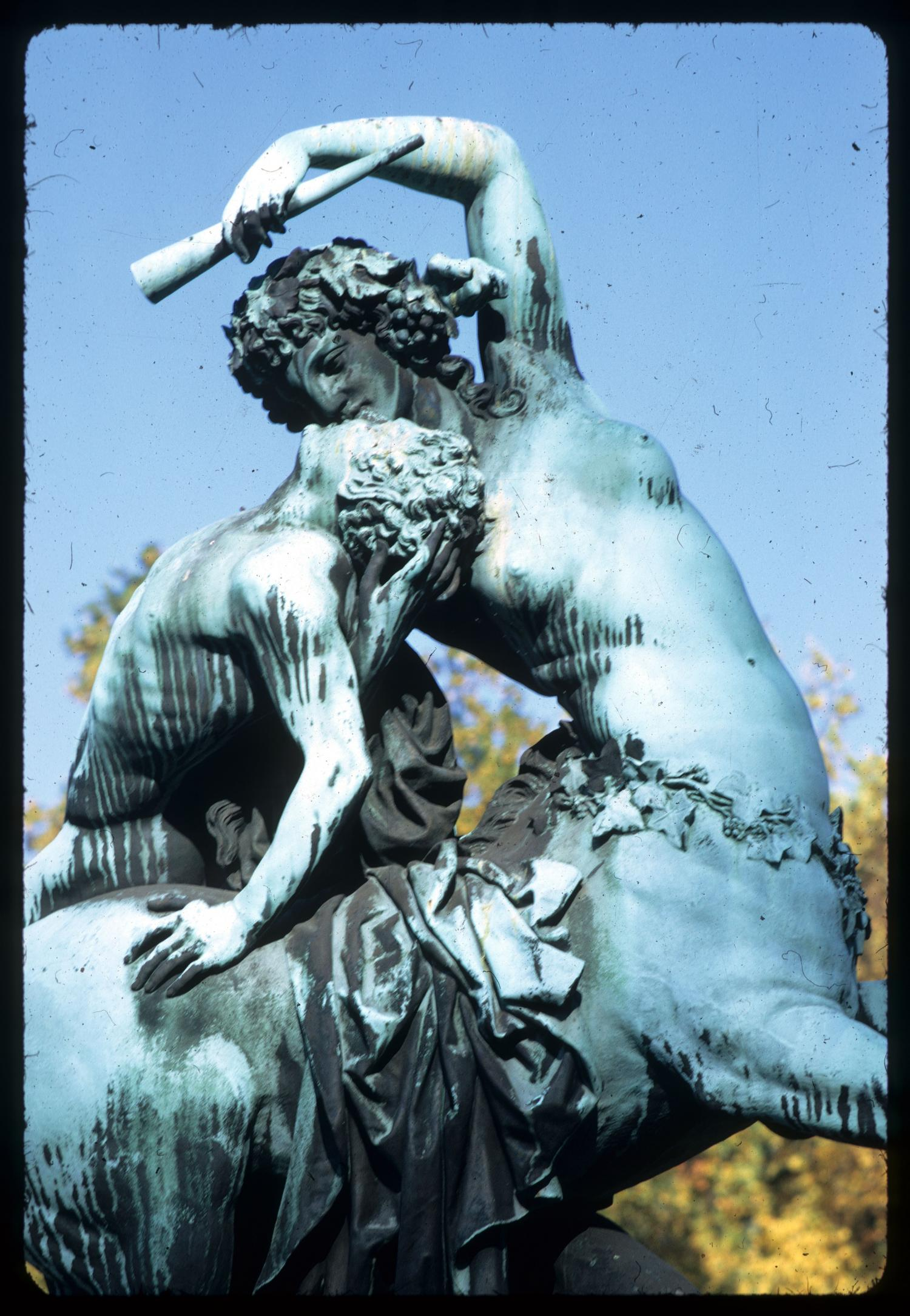
A photograph of the statue taken in 1972, before its restoration

Augustin Courtet, born in Lyon in 1821, created the sculpture early in his career. After graduating from the Lyon fine arts school, his work was first displayed at the 1847 Paris Salon, and a year later received a second class medal of sculpture at the 1848 edition. The sculpture was first made as a full plaster model in 1849. This model was then exhibited at the Paris Salon of the same year, under the name Bacchanale, centauresse et faune.

In 1850, the French state ordered the creation of a bronze from the model for 10000 F (Franc germinal). This made the sculpture one of the first publicly funded artworks dedicated to classical topics in France. It was cast by the Parisian founder Quesnel, as attested by an inscription on the base of the statue stating "Quesnel. Fondeur. Paris". It was then inaugurated at the Paris Salon of 1852, exhibited this time as a fully fledged bronze under the name Centauresse et Faune, groupe. The artwork was listed as belonging to the French interior ministry, which was at the time in charge of cultural affairs. Soon after the same year, it was donated to the city of Lyon.

The sculpture was originally installed in a prominent location of the Jardin du Palais Saint-Pierre, an inner courtyard of what is today the Museum of Fine Arts of Lyon. In April 1952, it was returned to the state and moved to the Parc de la Tête d'or, the main urban park of Lyon; it replaced another faun-themed sculpture made by Joseph Bernard that in turn entered the collection of the museum. The sculpture stands in front of the Porte des Enfants du Rhône, the South-West and main entrance of the park, and has remained there since then. It was restored shortly before 2012 after the bronze surface had become visibly corroded with time.

== Critical appraisal ==
The exhibition of the sculpture at two separate instances of the Salon (1849 and 1852) gave various art critics the opportunity to review the group.

Most critics expressed surprise or puzzlement at the topic of the artwork. In an otherwise very positive and quite lyrical review, F. Mercey from La Revue des deux Mondes questioned why Courtet called the group a Bacchanalia. He inferred that the associated accessories (grapes, vines, cups), while serving the composition well, were introduced to mitigate the topic's outrageous nature, as in his opinion the actual focus of the artwork was the overwhelmingly erotic component of the scene. He argued that there was no doubt that the two beings were under "a very different kind of intoxication" from the one caused by alcohol, something supported by the energy of the centauress as well as her very nature, leading her to "burn with the double love ignited in her double sides".

The overall composition with the position of the faun was appreciated, and the addition of the young leopard was found a satisfactory way to fill the empty space at the bottom of the group. While the general movement of the group was deemed "lively and graceful" by one critic, another found that the movement bringing the faun into the embrace of the centauress looked forced.

The anatomy of the centauress herself proved a point of contention. While Mercey praised the quality of the extremities, the visible thinning of part of the horse body was found to negatively impact the proportions of the anatomy, leading to a lack of elegance. One critic went further, judging that the lack of harmony between the torso and the rest of the body was so bad that "the bronze would have deserved another model".

Adolphe Breulier, from the Revue Archéologique, commented that classical artists considered as extremely difficult the execution of such creatures in sculpture. He explained that the most delicate part to carry out was the transition between the human torso and the lower part of the equestrian neck. He consequently judged that Courtet had partially avoided this hardship by surrounding the critical spot with an ivy garland, therefore depriving himself from the "glory" of overcoming the obstacle. On this point, Mercey was more positive, considering the garland of excellent taste and craftsmanship.

Writing for L'Illustration, J. Dubochet took issue with the very nature of the centauress. He argued that male centaurs were already aesthetically disjointed creatures, and that "putting a woman's torso on a horse's body is even more jarring than that of a heavily muscular man". He remarked: "No matter how pretty a centauress may be, she will hardly be loved, except in the way Louis XIII loved his mistresses – down to the belt only", a reference to the rumored homosexuality of French King Louis XIII.

== Gallery ==
Selected photographs
As seen when entering via the Porte des Enfants du Rhône

Back view

Close-up of the leopard and sculptor's signature

Close-up of the founder's signature

Front-right view

Back-right view

Back-left view

Front-left view
