= Anggitay =

Philippine mythological figures

Creature information
- Grouping: Legendary creature
- Sub grouping: Hybrid

Origin
- Region: Philippines

The Anggitay is a creature with the upper body of a female human and the lower body and legs of a horse from the waist down. They were the Philippine counterpart to the centauride, the female centaurs. They are also believed to be the female counterpart of the Tikbalang. They are sometimes depicted with a single horn in the middle of their forehead, just like a unicorn. They are usually said to be attracted to precious gemstones and jewelry. Their homeland is believed to be in Santo Tomas, Batangas.
