= Firelei Báez =

Dominican / American visual artist (born 1981)

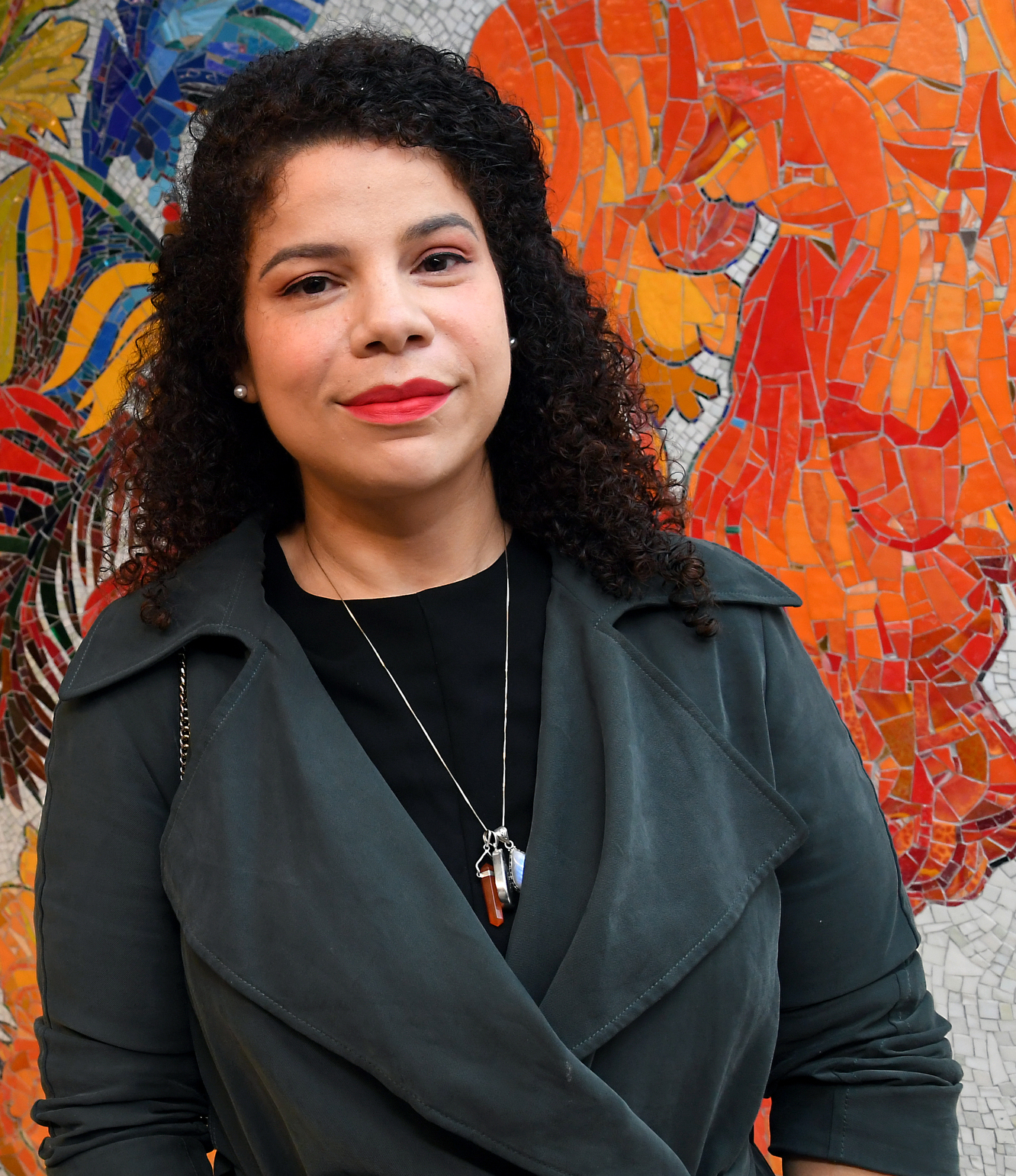
- Báez with her mosaic at 163 St-Amsterdam Av
- Born: 1981 (age 44–45); Santiago de los Caballeros, Dominican Republic
- Education: Miami Jackson High School; The Cooper Union; Hunter College
- Awards: Future Generation Art Prize (2017)

Firelei Báez (born 1981) is a Dominican Republic-born, New York City-based artist known for intricate works on paper and canvas, as well as large scale sculpture. Her art focuses on untold stories and unheard voices, using portraiture, landscape, and design to explore the Western canon.

Báez's work has been exhibited at the New Museum, New York, NY, the Pérez Art Museum Miami, Miami, Florida, Taller Puertorriqueño, Philadelphia, Pennsylvania, Ruth and Elmer Wellin Museum of Art, Clinton, New York, the Drawing Center, The Bronx Museum of the Arts, Bronx, New York and the Studio Museum, New York, New York, Tate Modern London. Her work was featured in the United States Biennial Prospect.3 in New Orleans, Louisiana, curated by Franklin Sirmans. She was included in Getty's Pacific Standard Time's LA>LA exhibition, the Pinchuk Art Foundation's Future Generation's Art Prize exhibition at the 2017 Venice Biennale, and the 2018 Berlin Biennale.

She has been the recipient of the Joan Mitchell Foundation Painters and Sculptors Award (2010), the Jacques and Natasha Gelman Award in Painting, the Catherine Doctorow Prize for Contemporary Painting (2015), and the Chiaro Award from the Headlands (2016). In 2015, Pérez Art Museum Miami organized Firelei Báez: Bloodlines. The exhibition catalogue included an introduction by Franklin Sirmans, the museum director, an essay by María Elena Ortiz, an interview with Naima Keith, and a contribution by the writer Roxane Gay.

== Early life and education ==
Báez was born in 1981 in Santiago de Los Caballeros to a Dominican mother and a father of Haitian descent, she was raised in Dajabón, a market city on the Dominican Republic's border with Haiti. At the age of 8, she relocated with her family to Miami, Florida.

Báez moved to New York in 2001 where she then received a bachelor's degree in arts from Cooper Union, a master's in fine arts from Hunter College in 2010, and studied at the Skowhegan School of Painting and Sculpture.

== Career ==
Báez works as an artist, and is based in New York City. She is known for intricate works on paper and canvas, as well as large scale sculpture and installation. In 2012, she began to create her ink and acrylic paintings on Yupo paper because of its nonabsorbent properties. Starting around 2017, the artist has directed her practice towards large scale works in which she directly paints onto various archival materials such as maps and architectural renderings.

Her art explores the Western canon through the elements of non-Western reading. Báez references various aspects of visual, material, and popular culture to represent the body in ways that challenge racial and class structures. She credits the work of David Hammons as first sparking her interest in using art to abstract and visualize Black and Brown bodies while simultaneously conveying their lived experiences. Báez also notes that science fiction writing of Octavia E. Butler has always inspired themes of Afrofuturism in her work, so much so that she paints a replication of Butler's Parable of the Sower (novel) in her painting titled On rest and resistance, Because we love you (to all those stolen from among us) (2020).

In fall of 2015, Báez had two solo museum shows Patterns of Resistance at the Utah Museum of Contemporary Art and Bloodlines at Pérez Art Museum Miami. In February 2016, Báez created a participatory installation with museum patrons at the Metropolitan Museum of Art. The program was presented in conjunction with the exhibition "The Power of Prints: The Legacy of William M. Ivins and A. Hyatt Mayor". The installation itself remained on display through March of that year.

=== Public art ===
Báez' glass mosaic tile mural for the New York Metro

In 2018, she was commissioned by the Metropolitan Transportation Authority to install two glass-tile platform-level murals and two mezzanine-level murals for the 163 St-Amsterdam Avenue subway station. The intricate, tropical patterns of the artwork, titled The Brief Wonderous Life of Oscar Wao (after a novel by Junot Diaz), refer to Báez' Caribbean background and to the demographics of the neighborhood. The mural imagery includes flowers and vines of tropical and North American plant species; these complex patterns are interwoven with images of "hand symbols" and female figures in the style of Ciguapas from the folklore of the Dominican Republic. Báez describes the work as having a level of "transparency" to Dominicans in the neighborhood. The glass mosaic work was produced by Mayer of Munich based on Báez' designs.

== Exhibitions ==
Given the ground (the fact that it amazes me does not mean I relinquish it) (2017) by Firelei Báez at the National Gallery of Art's showing of Afro-Atlantic Histories in Washington, DC in 2022

Báez has participated in several solo exhibitions and shows in the United States and internationally. Her solo shows include Psycho*Pomp (2012), Sheppard Fine Arts Gallery, University of Nevada, Reno; Firelei Báez: Bloodlines (2015), Pérez Art Museum Miami; Firelei Báez: Joy Out of Fire (2018), Schomburg Center for Research in Black Culture and Brooklyn Museum, New York; The Modern Window: For Améthyste and Athénaire (Exiled Muses Beyond Jean Luc Nancy's Canon), Anaconas (2018-2019), Museum of Modern Art, New York; and Firelei Báez (2021), ICA Watershed, Institute of Contemporary Art, Boston.

She has also participated in a number of group shows and exhibitions, including El Museo del Barrio Biennial (2011-2012), Prospect New Orleans (2014), and the Berlin Biennale (2018).

Her installation, To breathe full and free: a declaration, a re-visioning, a correction (19º36'16.9"N 72º13'07.0"W, 42º21'48.762"N 71º1'59.628"W), shown at the Watershed exhibit space of the Institute of Contemporary Art, was inspired by the ruins of the Sans Souci palace in Haiti. The formerly majestic mansion was constructed by the Haitian revolutionary and former slave Henri Christophe in 1813, who had crowned himself king.

Firelei Báez's work was featured in the traveling group show and accompanying publication Spirit in the Land, organized by the Nasher Museum of Art at Duke University in 2023 and on view at the Pérez Art Museum Miami in 2024. The show touches on aspects of her by commenting on the relationship between human bodies and the natural world. In 2024, the Institute of Contemporary Art/Boston exhibited the first major career retrospective on the work of the artist. Her work was included in the 2024 exhibition Making Their Mark: Works from the Shah Garg Collection at the Berkeley Art Museum and Pacific Film Archive (BAMPFA).

=== Can I Pass? series ===
Every day from 2011 to 2013, Báez created self-portraits in which she would paint a silhouette of her face, head, hair, and shoulders. Each painting she created was made in a color that matched her forearm and resembled that of a paper bag. Through this color, she references the historical Brown paper bag test to spotlight the discriminatory tests and practices that have been used to classify blackness in the United States. Her attention to hairstyles in these portraits of herself also connects the silhouettes to the fan test that evolved within the Dominican Republic that associates hair which does not blow straight back with African ancestry.

== Imagery, symbolism, and themes ==
Throughout her work, Báez references symbols and figures from Dominican folklore and history that highlight different aspects of femininity, race, power, and nature. One recurring motif in her work is the Ciguapa that appeared in a series of works that she painted from 2005 to 2015. Early on in this series, Báez painted ciguapas on books that had been decommissioned from nearby libraries and went on to paint them at a much larger scale on over cavases that measure over seven feet tall. She also includes Anacaona, another significant figure in mythology and folklore from Hispaniola, in a map painting titled Untitled (Anacaona) that explores how the body can act as a symbol of resistance, independence, and struggle.

== Grants, awards, and residencies ==
- Jacques and Natasha Gelman Award in Painting
- Joan Mitchell Foundation Painters and Sculptors Award (2010)
- Catherine Doctorow Prize for Contemporary Painting (2015)
- Chiaro Award from the Headlands (2016)
- Future Generation Art Prize (2017).
- College Art Association Artist Award for Distinguished Body of Work (2018)
- Smithsonian Artist Research Fellowship (2019)
- Soros Art Fellowship (2019)
- The Herb Alpert Awards in the Arts (2020)
- American Academy in Rome Philip Guston Rome Prize for visual arts (2021)

== Gallery representation ==
Báez has been represented by Hauser & Wirth since 2023. She previously worked with James Cohan Gallery and Kavi Gupta.

== Notable works in public collections ==
- Amidst the future and present there is a memory table (2013), Ruth and Elmer Wellin Museum of Art, Hamilton College, Clinton, New York
- To see beyond it and to access the places that we know outside its walls (2015), San Jose Museum of Art, California
- Sans-Souci (This threshold between a dematerialized and a historicized body) (2015), Pérez Art Museum Miami, Florida
- Of Love Possessed (lessons on alterity for G.D. and F.G at a local BSS) (2016), Spelman College Museum of Fine Art, Atlanta
- To Access the Places that Lie Beyond (2017), Kemper Museum of Contemporary Art, Kansas City, Missouri
- Elegant gathering in a secluded garden (or the many bridges we crossed) (2018), Studio Museum in Harlem, New York
- Those who would douse it (it does not disturb me to accept that there are places where my identity is obscure to me, and the fact that it amazes you does not mean I relinquish it) (2018), Kunstmuseum Wolfsburg, Germany
- An Open Horizon (or the stillness of a wound) (2019), Cornell Fine Arts Museum, Rollins College, Orlando, Florida
- Tignon for Ayda Weddo (or that which a center can not hold) (2019), Nasher Museum of Art, Duke University, Durham, North Carolina
- the trace, whether we are attending to it or not (a space for each other's breathing) (2019), New Orleans Museum of Art
- Untitled (Central Power Station) (2019), Dallas Museum of Art
- Untitled (Tabula Anemographica seu Pyxis Navtic) (2021), Whitney Museum of American Art
- Olamina (How do we learn to love each other while we are embattled) (2022), Metropolitan Museum of Art

== Selected publications ==
- Perez Art Museum. Firelei Báez : Bloodlines. Miami, Florida: Perez Art Museum, 2015. ISBN 978-0-9898546-7-2.
- "Bodies of Color: Images of Women in the Works of Firelei Báez and Rachelle Mozman." Aranda-Alvarado, Rocío. Small Axe : a Journal of Criticism 21, no. 1 (2017): 57–69. https://doi.org/10.1215/07990537-3844078.
- "Flora and Fauna Otherwise: Black and Brown Aesthetics of Relation in Firelei Báez and Wangechi Mutu." Alvarado, Leticia. Latin American and Latinx Visual Culture 1, no. 3 (2019): 8–24. https://doi.org/10.1525/lavc.2019.130003.
- Firelei Báez: to breathe full and free. Firelei Báez, David Norr, Carla Acevedo-Yates, Mark Godfrey, Legacy Russell, Thelma Golden, Eva Respini. New York: Gregory R. Miller & Co., 2022.

== See also ==
- List of American artists 1900 and after
