= Olivorio Mateo =

Dominican revolutionary and spiritual leader (1876–1922)

Olivorio Mateo Ledesma (1876 – June 27, 1922) was a Dominican revolutionary and spiritual healer. Known by his nickname, Papá Liborio, he is presented as a popular figure in Dominican Vudú tradition.

Coming from a rural background, his guerrilla actions were considered a threat to the governments of the Dominican Republic and to the U.S occupation of the island, which he faced on sixteen occasions until his death in 1922.

His popularity in the rural areas of the Dominican Republic continues to be present, with an altar in San Juan de la Maguana to which people go to ask for favors. A folk hero in the Dominican Republic, he has been claimed in many expressions of popular Dominican culture, such as film, music and literature.

== Origins ==
Born in 1876, in San Juan de la Maguana, Dominican Republic, he was the son of Andrés Mateo and Sacarila Ledesma, both Afro-Dominican farmers who lived off the exploitation of small agricultural plots. The messianic figure of Olivorio emerged at the beginning of the 20th century in San Juan de la Maguana.

== Occultism ==
According to legend, it has been said that Mateo (Papá Liborio) disappeared for several days during an unexpected hurricane that occurred in the San Juan Valley in 1908. No one knew of him until he appeared seven days later, meditating, sitting on his father's land. This was the beginning of his triple mission as a healer, prophet and guerrilla fighter. He presented himself as a man with a long beard who received a divine message while he was lost and proclaimed himself an envoy of God. He cured the sick with a shot of rum and a tome called "Tirindanga", while he exhorted people to live in peace, encouraged the cult of the Holy Trinity and made dramatic prophecies.

He was called by some of his followers the Master or simply Papá and became a kind of messiah for the inhabitants of the southern region of the Dominican Republic. His roots as a leader made him a source of concern for the governments of Ramón Cáceres and Eladio Victoria, as well as being considered a danger to the occupying American forces, who had issued the first American military intervention in the Dominican Republic in 1916.

== Fight against the United States ==
Between 1916 and 1922, he faced the occupying forces that held power in the country on 16 occasions. In 1920, Liborio agreed to hand over the weapons that were in the group, but some of his followers, especially some who had been persecuted by the law and had taken refuge in the movement, opposed this. From then on, the interventionist government considered Liborio to be the most dangerous guerrilla in the country and speeded up preparations to kill him.

That same year, Liborio and the regular soldiers under the command of the intervention troops fought a fierce battle at the place known as "La Peñita", which left dozens dead and 67 wounded. On that occasion, the "Maestro" managed to escape alive and entrenched himself with more than 200 men on Sabrosa Hill, in the northwest of the republic, near the border. At that last point, Liborio Mateo Ledesma was shot dead on June 27, 1922, as was one of his sons.

== In popular culture ==
The Dominican singer-songwriter Luis Días composed the song "Liborio" in his honor, in which he recounts the exploits of the peasant character. The song is contained in his 1984 album Luis 'Terror' Días.

=== Cinema ===
In 2021, Dominican filmmaker and editor Nino Martínez Sosa directed and co-wrote the film Liborio, starring actor Vicente Santos as Papá Liborio. The film tells the story of Liborio after getting lost in the hurricane, his reappearance a few days later as a prophet and healing the sick, his life in the mountains with his followers, and his confrontation with a contingent of the Marine Corps sent by the United States to restore order in the country.

== See also ==
- Folklore of the Dominican Republic
- Dominican Vudú
