= Tapao =

Urban legend in the Dominican Republic

In Dominican folklore, the story of the Tapao is a legend of a mysterious man from the colonial era of the Dominican Republic. Despite having lived in a residence in the Colonial City of Santo Domingo, only few know his actual appearance. Some said that he hid his face with a mask; others, with a hood or a veil. His existence was so enigmatic that it was thought that he was a twin brother of the King of Spain, who feared being supplanted by him and expelled him to Hispaniola. It was also believed that he was a member of the palace nobility who killed another high-ranking knight and hid in Santo Domingo. A third version claimed that he was a leper who hid his spots. Whoever he was, they never saw his face or knew his name.

== See also ==
- Folklore of the Dominican Republic
