= Karnabo =

Mythical creature of Ardennes folklore

The Karnabo is a creature of Ardennes folklore. It is reputedly the offspring of a supernatural entity (either a demon or a ghoul) and a Bohemian traveller (sometimes said to be a sorcerer). The Karnabo resembles a man but with an elephant's trunk for a nose and the eyes of a basilisk. The breath of the creature is said to be able to paralyse men and kill animals. It is said to have abducted a young girl and folklore states that her moans and trumpet of the creature can be heard during thunderstorms.

== Description ==
The Karnabo story is known in the lower Meuse valley in the Franco-Belgian Ardennes. In folklore the Karnabo is described as the sexual offspring of a demon (in other accounts a 67-year-old ghoul) and a Bohemian who travelled across the Ardennes in ancient times. In some accounts the Bohemian was a powerful sorcerer who cast many spells upon the people and animals of the Ardennes. Before leaving the area for good he passed some of his powers onto the Karnabo, including the making of spells and the ability to cure whitlow on Good Friday. Stories of the Karnabo were popularly told as winter night's tales.

The Karnabo is described as having the face of a human but with the eyes of a basilisk and the trunk of an elephant. The Karnabo is said not to attack humans ordinarily though it has to power to render unconscious those that pass close by its lair and to kill animals by means of whistling through its trunk.

By one account it resided for a long time in an abandoned slate quarry near Regniowez. The Karnabo is said to have captured a young girl who approached its lair and dragged her into a cavern after which the girl and the Karnabo were never seen again. The wails of the girl and the trumpet of the Karnabo are said to be heard in times of stormy weather.

Folklorist Claude Seignolle writing in his 2015 second volume of Contes, récits et légendes des pays de France [Tales, stories and legends from the regions of France] considers the Karnabo a local variant of the wider Ardennes myth of the Mahwot. The Mahwot is reputed to be an amphibious lizard around the size of a calf that resides in the Meuse between the French town of Revin and the Belgian city of Liège. The Mahwot is said to leave the river only on exceptional occasions, which presages a disaster. The creature is reputed to have been last sighted at Revin and Givet in July 1870, in the lead-up to the Franco-Prussian War in which France would be defeated and lose territory.
