= Baccoo =

Character from Guyanese and Surinamese folklore

A Baccoo (bakru in Sranan Tongo, and bakulu or bakuu in Saramaccan language) is a mythical character from Guyanese and Surinamese folklore.

== Description ==
Description of a Baccoo varies, however many describe it as a figure consisting of a large head and a body of which half consists of wood, while the other half consists of flesh. Some also mention missing kneecaps as a prominent feature. There seems to be a distinction between Baccoos who are mercenaries to successful merchants that they make contracts with, and those that haunt their surrounding.

Baccoo are known to subside on a diet of milk and bananas fed to them by whomever they serve. Some stories tell of baccoo carrying out tasks for their contractor, sometimes causing fires or throwing stones at the targets they are sent to torment as invisible attackers, other times simply carrying messages discretely from one place to another.

== Origin ==
Baccoo might be related to Abiku, an entity in the Yoruba culture. The Abiku is a spirit of a baby that dies before being named. In honour of these deceased small wooden statues are made and kept inside. Others argue the origin to be the Akan mmoatia. However, the concept evolved and got influenced by other cultures. Currently the folklore is shared by people from various cultural backgrounds.
