= Tariaksuq =

Creature in Inuit mythology

In Inuit mythology the Tariaksuq (Taqriaqsuk, Taqriaqsuq, Tarriaksuk, Tarriaksuq, Tarriassuk, Tarriassuq; (plural) "Shadow-People", Taqriaqsuit, Tariaksuit, Tarriaksuit, Tarriassuit) is a humanoid creature associated with shadows, invisibility and obscurity.

It is said that, for the most part, they are the same as any other human being. They have houses, families, weapons, tools, and more. Where they deviate from normal people, however, is that they are not visible by looking straight at them. In looking directly at them, they either disappear into the separate world which they occupy, apart from our own, or they are only seen for the shadow they cast. They only become visible if they are killed, and they are said to appear as half-man-half-caribou creatures.

Aside from the strange condition of their visibility, it is also known that they can only catch prey while hunting it on foot.

== See also ==
- Ijiraq (mythology)
