= Centauride =

Mythological creatures of Greek mythology

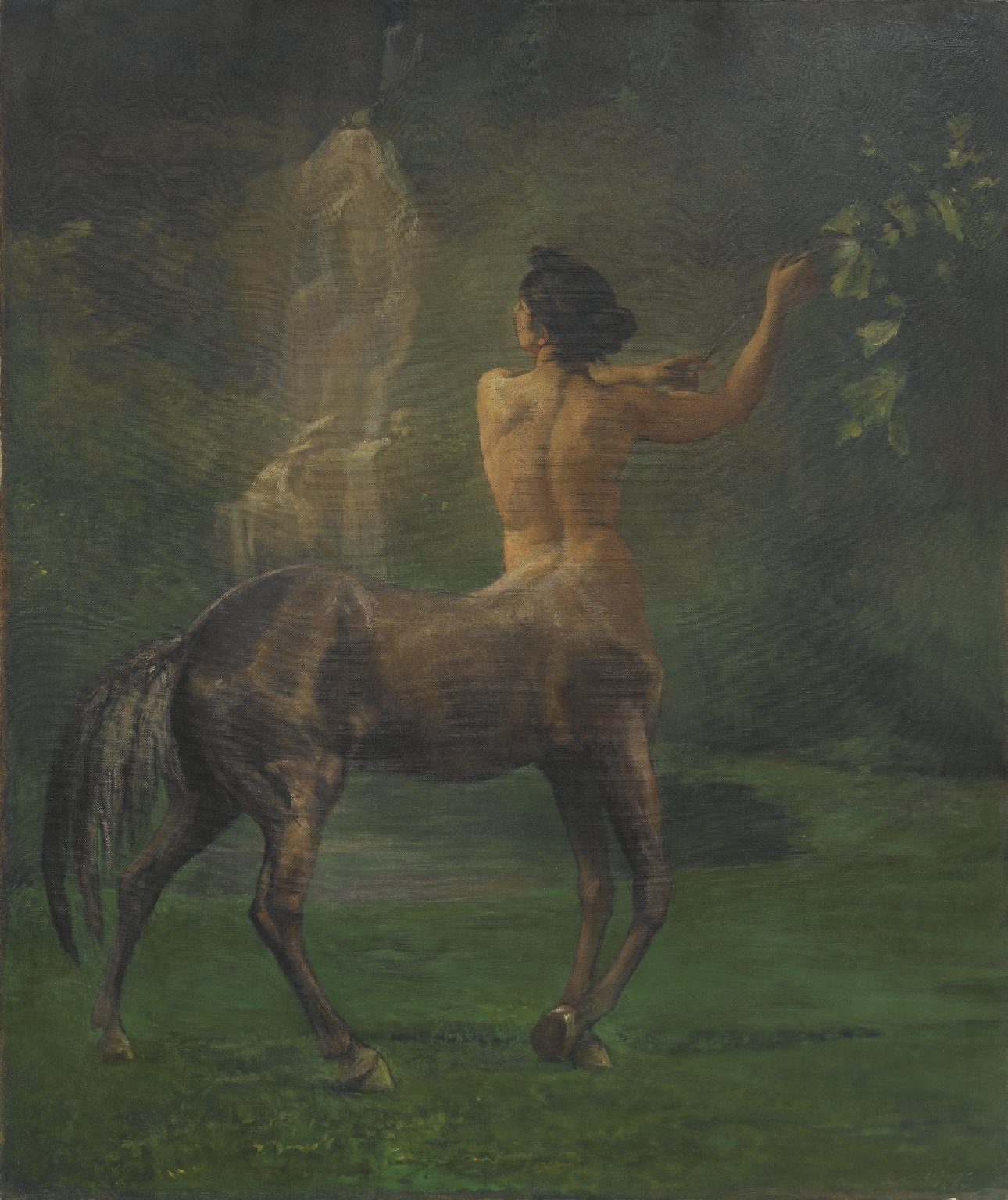
- Centauress, by John La Farge, in the Brooklyn Museum

Creature information
- Other name(s): Centauresses, Kentaurides
- Grouping: Legendary creature
- Sub grouping: Hybrid
- Similar entities: Minotaur, satyr, harpy
- Folklore: Greek

Origin
- Country: Greece
- Habitat: Land

A Centauride (Ancient Greek: Κενταυρίδε, Kentauride) or centauress is a female centaur. First encountered in Greek mythology as members of the tribe of the Centauroi, the Centaurides are only occasionally mentioned in written sources, but appear frequently in Greek art and Roman mosaics. The centauress who appears most frequently in literature is Hylonome, wife of the centaur Cyllarus.

== Names ==
As a proper noun, Centauride or Kentauride refers specifically to a female of the tribe of the Centauroi or Kentauroi (Κένταυροι), commonly rendered in English as the common noun "centaurs"; as a common noun, centauride refers to any female centaur. Centauress is the more usual term in English, but centaurelle and centaurette may also occur.

== Literary depictions ==
In the "Imagines", the rhetorician Philostratus the Elder gives a brief description of the Centaurides:

How beautiful the Centaurides are, even where they are horses; for some grow out of white mares, others are attached to chestnut mares, and the coats of others are dappled, but they glisten like those of horses that are well cared for. There is also a white female Centaur that grows out of a black mare, and the very opposition of the colours helps to produce the united beauty of the whole.

In the "Metamorphoses", Ovid gives a brief description of Hylonome:

In the high woods there was none comelier of all the centaur-girls, and she alone by love and love’s sweet words and winning ways held Cyllarus, yes, and the care she took to look her best (so far as that may be with limbs like that). She combed her glossy hair, and twined her curls in turn with rosemary or violets or roses, and sometimes she wore a pure white lily. Twice a day she bathed her face in the clear brook that fell from Pagasae’s high forest, twice she plunged her body in its flow, nor would she wear on her left side and shoulder any skin but what became her from best-chosen beasts.

Shakespeare refers to centauresses in King Lear, Act IV, Scene VI, lines 124–125:

"Down from the waist they're centaurs,
Though women all above".

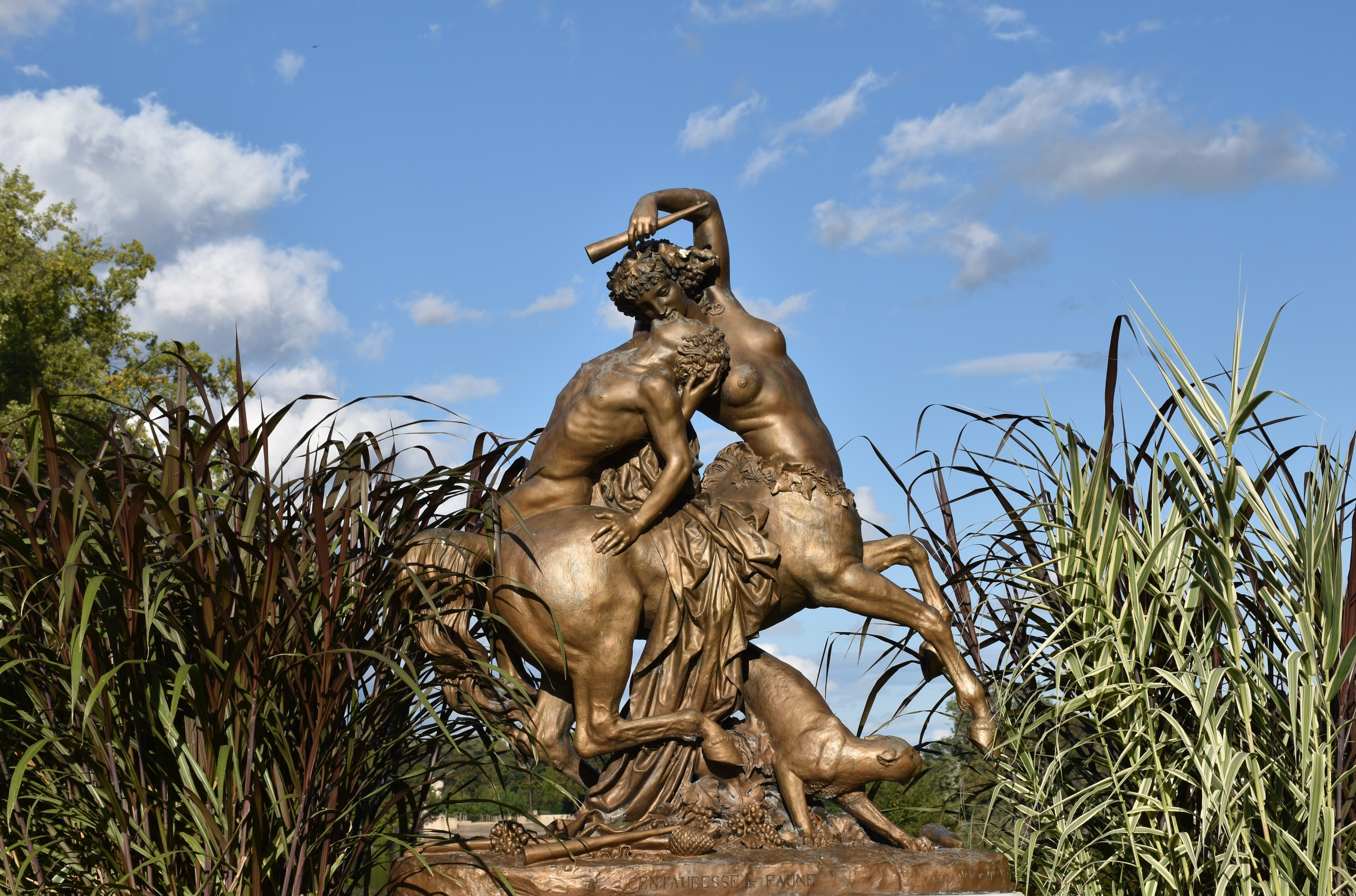
Augustin Courtet, Centauress and Faun (1849), Lyon, Parc de la Tête d’or

== Other appearances ==
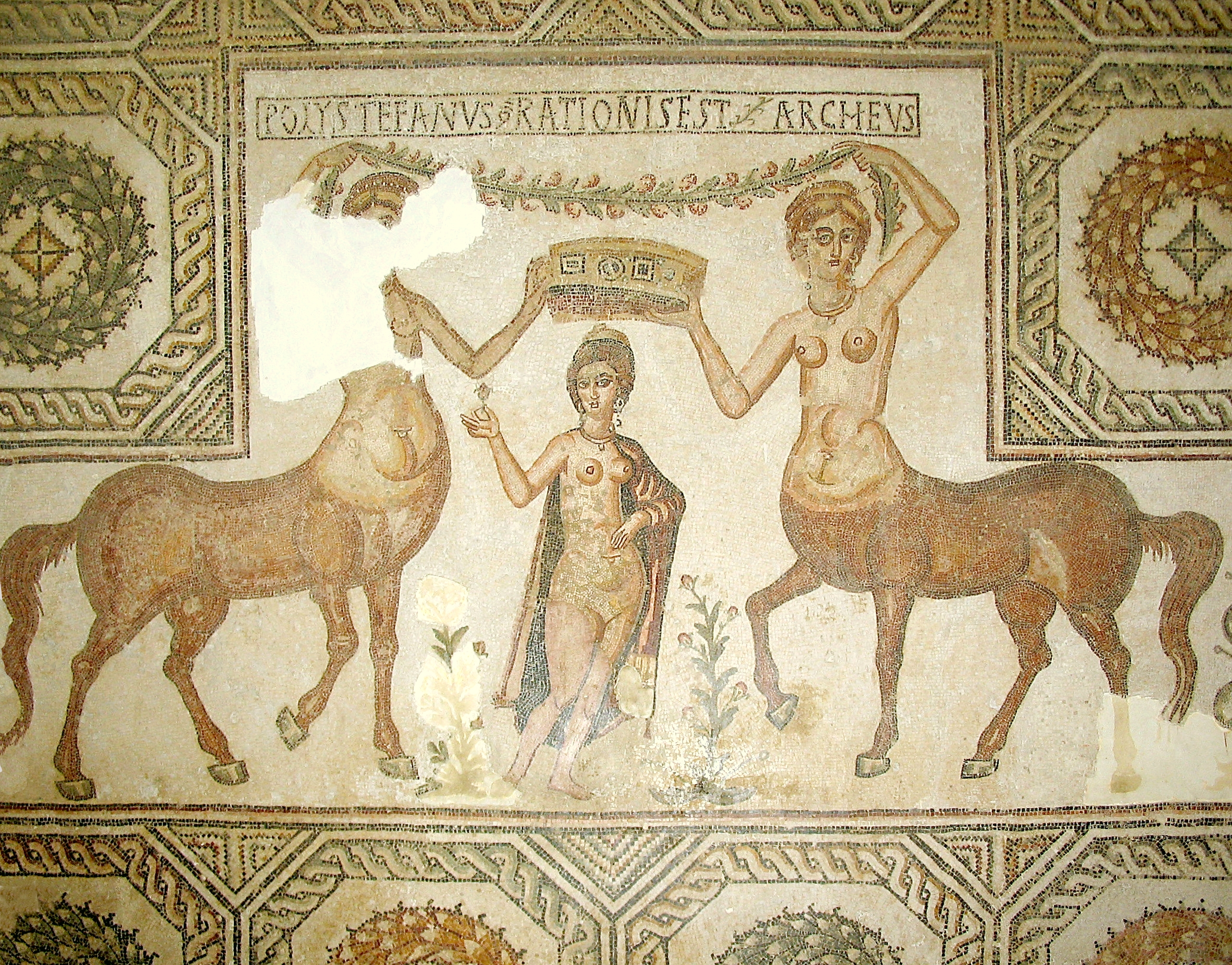
Female centaurs flanking Venus (Mosaic from Roman Tunisia, 2nd century AD)

A British family named Lambert used a female centaur holding a rose in her left hand as a heraldic device, and depicted this figure in their monuments. However, they were unable to establish official authority for these arms, and in the eighteenth century changed them to a male centaur holding a bow.

In Walt Disney's film Fantasia, Beethoven's Pastoral Symphony is illustrated with scenes from Greek mythology, in which male and female centaurs, referred to by the studio as "centaurettes", feature prominently. The centaurettes appear in various situations, some of which depict them affecting the mannerisms of fashionable women in 1940. The centaurettes are shown in a variety of colours other than human skin tones, including blue, and were originally drawn bare-breasted, but applying the Hays code, the Motion Picture Producers and Distributors of America forced the animators to cover their breasts with garlands. Changing attitudes toward racial stereotypes in the 1960s led to the cutting of scenes depicting black centaurettes waiting on the others.

The song Witch Of The Westmoreland, originally sung by Barbara Dickson on the folk album From The Beggar's Mantle, features a benevolent witch, described in the song as "[o]ne half the form of a maiden fair/And a jet-black mare's body."

Since the late 2000s, as a part of the monster girl trend in Japan, female centaurs have appeared in several Japanese anime and manga such as Monster Musume and A Centaur's Life.

== See also ==
- Satyress
- Anggitay
- Sihuanaba
