= Galipote (mythological creature) =

Mythological creature of the Dominican Republic

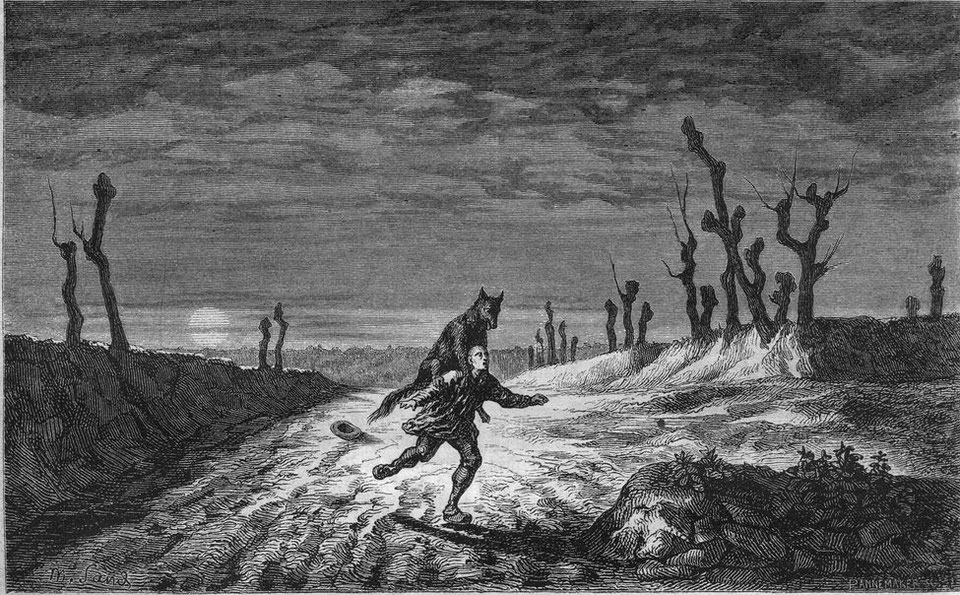
Depiction of Galipote, which may have derived from the European werewolf.

The Galipote (Spanish pronunciation: [galiˈpote]), also called Zángano (pronounced [ˈsaŋɡano]) or Lugarú (pronounced [luɣaˈɾu]), is a legendary creature from the Dominican Republic, originally from San Juan, which probably dates back to the 17th and 18th centuries. It was a mythical being characterized by the ability to transform into different animals and inanimate objects (such as trees or stones), as well as enjoying atrocious strength and immunity against firearms. It was said that he used to feed on the blood of innocent children (which he sucked during the nights), with which he obtained eternal life; it is also said that they practiced macabre sexual acts with them.

The origin of his power is not entirely clear, however, most agree that it was due to a pact with the devil, which fits perfectly with the strong Christian foundation of the Dominican Republic.

According to legend, they were cruel and violent beings who enjoyed leading night walkers astray and frightening the unwary. The legend of the galipote is one that has survived the passage of time, at least in the most remote places of the country, where even today acts are granted to this macabre creature. The legend is so deep-rooted that, in some areas of the country, walkers do not go out at night without protective amulets or reciting some spell.

== Characteristics ==
There is a belief in a galipote capable of turning exclusively into a dog, known as lugaru (a term that seems to come from the French loup-garou, a name used for the legendary werewolf or lycanthrope). This suggests that the legend of the Galipote has a European basis (werewolf), mixed with African elements, in a Christian background.

There is also talk of another subspecies known as drone or zancú, characterized by the ability to walk with strides (as long as the distance between one river and another), capable even of becoming invisible.

== Weakness ==
According to popular belief, the galipote was only vulnerable to a stake from a tree known as palo de cruz, which had to be cut specifically on Good Friday.

== See also ==
- Folklore of the Dominican Republic
- Ciguapa
- Lagahoo
