= Nuli =

Legendary race of Indian people

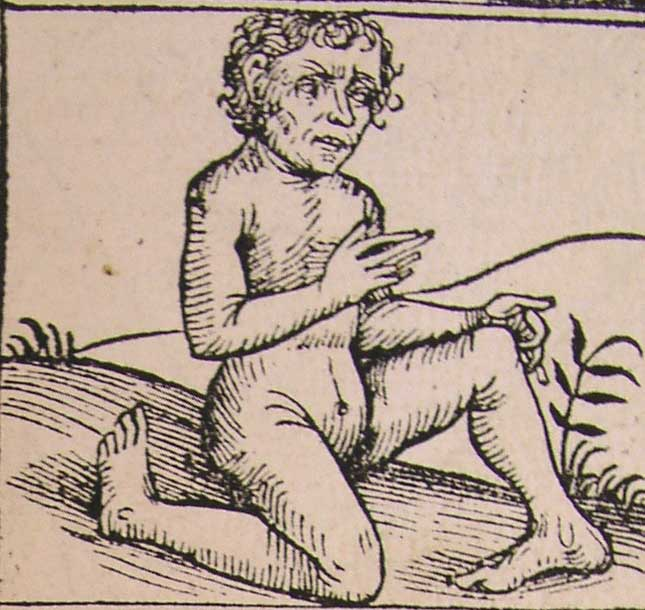
Illustration in the Nuremberg Chronicle (1493)

The Nuli, Nuloi or Nouloi (Greek: Νυλοι, Νουλοι) were a legendary race of people with backward-facing, eight-toed feet, living on Mount Nulus in India.

== Ancient sources ==
The Nuli were described by Greek historian Megasthenes in the Indica.

They also appear in Medieval bestiaries, like the Nuremberg Chronicle.

== See also ==
- Abarimon
