= Ijiraq =

Shape shifter in Inuit mythology

In Inuit religion, an ijiraq (/ˈiːjɪrɑːk/ EE-yi-rahk or /ˈiːdʒɪrɑːk/ EE-ji-rahk; plural ijirait) is a shapeshifting creature said to kidnap children, hide them away and abandon them. The inuksuk (or inukshuk) of stone allow these children to find their way back if they can convince the ijiraq to let them go.

== Description ==
In North Baffin dialects, ijiraq means 'Shape Shifter'. While tariaksuq (shadow people) appear like a half-man-half-caribou monster, an ijiraq can appear in any form it chooses, making it particularly deceptive. Their eyes will always stay red, no matter what they shapeshift into. Their real form is just like a human, but their eyes and mouth are sideways. (According to the book of Dutch writer Floortje Zwigtman, only the shaman knows the real form of the Ijiraq). When one is hunting somewhere that Ijirait inhabit, they will see them or a strange caribou instead of a normal shadow in the corner of their eye for a fleeting moment (like tariaksuq). If one tries to observe them directly however, they are completely elusive. They are sometimes helpful; other times, they are fatally deceptive.

== Freeman's Cove ==
One of the most noted places in the Arctic for sightings of these shape shifters (and tariaksuq) is the Freeman's Cove area of Tuktusirvik (place to hunt caribou), Bathurst Island, a rich oasis. It is surrounded in a horseshoe pattern by dormant volcanic mountains. Historically, Freeman's Cove is most notable as a stopover for the Intrepid on an Arctic expedition with Edward Belcher.

== Story ==
The Ijirait are said to inhabit a place between two worlds; not quite inside this one, nor quite out of it. Inuit further south than the North Baffin group used to hold to a belief that some Inuit went too far north in the chase for game, and became trapped between the world of the dead and the world of the living, and thus became the Ijirait. According to the small handful of surviving elders in the South Baffin Region that knew these beliefs, the Inuit that are settled in Resolute and Grise Fiord are these shape shifters or shadow people, because they went too far north. Some elders will avoid being in presence of extreme-northern Inuit, fearing they are evil Ijirait or Tariaksuq.

The home of the Ijirait is said to be cursed, and one will lose their way, no matter how skilled or familiar with the land.
