= Abarimon =

Mythological creature

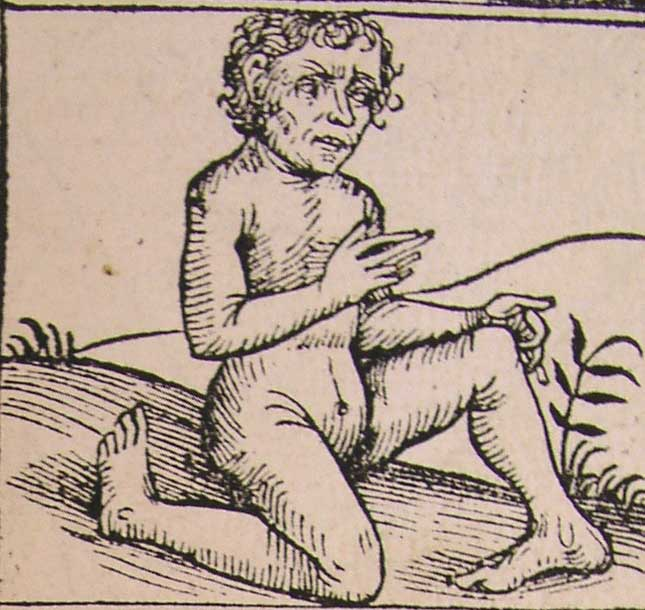
A Nulos, similar to an abarimon. Woodcut from Hartmann Schedel: Nuremberg Chronical, 1493, p. XIIr.

Abarimon or antipode in mythology are people whose feet are reversed, however, in spite of this disability, were able to run at extreme speeds.

This majestic tribe was first described in Europe by Pliny the Elder, in his book, Natural History (VII 11), who believed them to be native to India. A tale that is alike is depicted by Aulus Gellius in Attic Nights.

They coexisted with wild animals and any endeavor to capture them was unsuccessful because they were so ferocious and barbarian. In his book, Pliny points out information that derives from Baiton, Alexander the Great's Land Surveyor. Because of the special quality of air, the abarimons were only able to breathe the air of their own domestic valleys, according to Baiton. If the special quality of air was breathed for a long period of time, breathing any other type of air would be impossible. Because of this, the inhabitants were not able to depart from the valley and live elsewhere in the world. Therefore, it was impossible to entrap them and shepard them to the courts of a distant ruler, or to the great Macedonian conquest.

It is very feasible that this is an overly designed ethnographic description of a prehistoric wildlife strain in the areas near Himalayas.

As stated by a different legend, Abarimon is referred to as a landscape found in Scythia, a valley of Mount Imaus, (which may be indistinguishable to Hindukush or the Himalayan Mountains).

Later, Abarimon has been summarized in Thomas Cooper's Thesaurus Linguae Romanae et Britannicae, as a tribe in the country Tataria. Throughout the Middle Ages, after a familiar heliocentric view, some map drawers made creatures in the shape of Abarimon people and positioned them at the outermost border of the world.

== See also ==
- Ciguapa
- Curupira
- Nuli
