= Ciguapa =

Dominican mythological creature

Baquiní y la ciguapa del Camú (Baquiní and the ciguapa of the Camú River, 1949) by Jaime Colson, held to be the first painting of the ciguapa.

The ciguapa (Spanish pronunciation: [siˈɣwapa]; /siːˈɡwɑːpə/ see-GWAH-pə) is a mythological creature of the folklore of the Dominican Republic. While variations abound, it is typically described as a back-footed nude woman with knee-length hair, with siren-like magic powers of attraction, seducing men that wander the forests at night. The ciguapa's legendary home are the forests and rivers in the mountains of El Cibao. The malevolence of the ciguapa varies considerably, sometimes depicted as a spritely nature being, other times naive and self-destructively jealous of love, and further as a cannibal.

While the legend is largely accepted to have been first written in 1866 by Francisco Javier Angulo Guridi, it is disputed whether the legend stems from Taíno mythology, or was fakelore derived from other Caribbean lore for the purpose of Dominican national myth-building. In the 20th century, the legend of the ciguapa became a propaganda piece as a symbol of mestizaje during the dictatorship of Rafael Trujillo, entrenched as proof of the Dominican national identity and history of mestizaje. The legend has since been re-contextualized as a multicultural and feminist Dominican cultural icon, and as a focus of Dominican fine art, writing and popular culture.

== Description ==
The ciguapa's traits vary widely between stories. In the 1866 story La Ciguapa by Francisco Javier Angulo Guridi, the creature is described as an extremely beautiful Ciguayo woman with golden skin and almond-shaped black eyes, nude with well-kempt, knee-length hair, and only three feet tall, though expressly not from dwarfism. Carrying a walking stick, the ciguapa is powerfully lithe, able to jump between trees; it is unable to speak, only howl. Core to Guridi's ciguapa is its jealousy of human romance: upon witnessing physical love, the ciguapa howls and causes the like-gendered person to die of fright, and ultimately dies of sorrow itself.

The legend of the ciguapa was further expanded upon after the release of Guridi's novel. Most retellings of the ciguapa are defined by the additions of backwards-facing feet and a siren-like drive to seduce and kill the opposite sex. In the 20th century, writer and president of the Dominican Republic Juan Bosch particularly reiterated the traits of the ciguapa in line with Guridi's is his 1935 essay Indios: apuntes históricos y leyendas, but notably included the back-footedness that had become a part of the folktale by that time, further entrenching that physical trait.

The skin tone of the ciguapa varies between depictions: originally expressly indigenous Caribbean, depictions have expanded to include mestizo and Afro-Dominicans. However, the ciguapa is also occasionally described with an inhuman, blue skin. Other physical features of the ciguapa may include backwards eyes, having thick body hair, and being feathered. While some tales of ciguapas describe them as speaking, those that cannot may whimper or chirp instead of howling like Guridi's ciguapa. More violent variations may have horns and claws. The ciguapa is uncommonly described as a man (ciguapo, masc.). In Guridi's La ciguapa, ciguapos heterosexually mirror the same behavior as female ciguapas, killing the man and seducing the bereaved woman.

Activities ascribed to the ciguapa include being nocturnal; having great acrobatic skill, able to jump through tree canopies; stealing cereal crops, meat, and lard; foraging for fruit, fish and small animals; and riding horses at dawn, braiding their manes. The lair of the ciguapa is traditionally in the mountainous forests surrounding the valley of El Cibao; they are described as living in trees, grottos, caves, or rivers within the forest.

Some stories describe attempts to capture the ciguapa. Back-footed ciguapas use their opposite-facing tracks to confuse pursuers. Ciguapa hunting stories often dictate use of an abnormal hunting dog, with requirements like it being a wild dog (jíbaro), polydactyl, or according to Juan Bosch, black-haired and five-legged. However, hunting the ciguapa is presented as ultimately pointless, as the ciguapa dies quickly in confinement.

=== Homonymic legends ===
In Cuban folklore, the ciguapa (or ciguá) is a wife of a water spirit, with dark skin. It is also described as a tall, furred black man with talons.

The ciguapo is the name of a Dominican folklore creature, a rooster with abnormal traits like backwardness, a woman's breasts, a human-like cry, and an association with misfortune.

== History ==
Francisco Javier Angulo Guridi is commonly held to have wrote the first account of the ciguapa, in his short story La ciguapa in 1866, first published in Dominican newspaper El Tiempo . In the story, the ciguapa menaces a young White Dominican couple in El Cibao. The legend traveled with Dominican mambises to Holguín, Cuba in the late 1860s when they occupied the city to support Cuban independence from Spain in the Ten Years' War.

During the regime of dictator Rafael Trujillo, the ciguapa was further entrenched into the national mythos to support the state goal of mestizaje. The ciguapa story was used as proof of an existing mestizaje history, in how the sexual, indigenous ciguapa preys on dominantly White Dominican men from El Cibao. This inherent racial identity was used by the Trujillo regime to propagandize the racialization of a national mestizo identity: homogenizing indigenous and White Dominican ancestries via blanqueamiento into a 'Dominican race', to the exclusion of Afro-Haitians and Afro-Dominicans. This propagandizing reinforced anti-black racism and Anti-Haitian sentiment in the Dominican Republic, as well as vilifying those indigenous that resisted mestizaje.

In 1949 in Paris, Dominican artist Jaime Colson made the first recognized artwork of the ciguapa, entitled Baquiní y la ciguapa del Camú (Baquiní and the ciguapa of the Camú River), depicting dark-skinned ciguapas with horns and claws. Following the Dominican Civil War and the establishment of the Fourth Dominican Republic, the legend of the ciguapa began to be creolized with influence from Afro-Dominicans and Haitian-Dominicans. The ciguapa began to see explicitly mixed-race descriptions, an early prominent example being the 1980 novel Goeíza by Manuel Mora Serrano.

=== Etymology ===
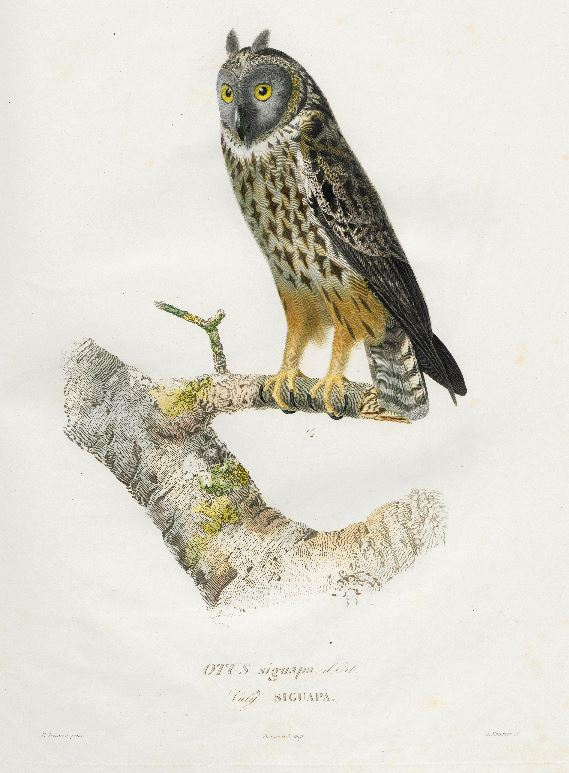
The Cuban Stygian owl, Asio stygius siguapa, commonly known as the siguapa

The etymology of ciguapa as presented by Manuel Sera Mora in 1975 is disputed: according to the 1951 edition of the Taíno language glossary Palabras indígenas de la isla de Santo Domingo (Indigenous Words of the Island of Santo Domingo), "ciguapa" is a corruption of Ciguayo; Latin-American historian José Juan Arrom disagrees, saying that the word has no indigenous origin.

The term ciguapa (or siguapa) existed prior to Francisco Javier Angulo Guridi's 1866 novel in Cuban lexicography. The ciguapa was the common name for the Cuban Stygian owl, first described as a species in 1839 as A. stygius (siguapa) by French naturalist Alcide d'Orbigny. Additionally, La Ciguapa was the name of a town in Oriente Province, a stronghold of mid-19th century Cuban antislavery and independence agitation. The Hispaniolan Stygian owl (A. stygius (noctipetens)), first described 1916, is also commonly called the ciguapa, among other local names, in the Dominican Republic.

=== Provenance ===
There has been no explicit historical record of the ciguapa prior to Guridi's 1866 novel, neither in Spanish colonial literature nor in any indigenous cultural artifacts, for example Taíno cave paintings.

Creo muy nuestra esta leyenda, única, tal vez, entre las tantas que la voz del campo refiere, capaz de guiar a un acucioso investigador a la independiente búsqueda de nuestras tradiciones, a las que no debemos ni al fiero conquistador ni al burdo esclavo africano.
I believe that this legend [of the ciguapa] is very much our own; it is unique amongst so many to which the voices of rural areas refer; it can serve as a guide for any conscientious investigator wishing to conduct independent research into our traditions, which owe nothing to anybody else, neither to savage conquistador nor to coarse African slave.

— Juan Bosch, 1935

Popular consensus of the late 20th century was that the ciguapa had an indigenous mythology origin, though its exact mythological provenance was debated. One theory was that the ciguapa was an allusion to the popular memory of the Ciguayos, a native tribe known for long hair, living in the mountains, and resisting colonization; another similar theory instead suggested the 'Indians of the Waters' (Los Indios de las Aguas), a folktale that the Taíno continued a clandestine civilization in river grottos post-colonization. The ciguapa was also suggested to be derived from other Dominican folklore monsters like the biembien. Writer and president of the Dominican Republic Juan Bosch asserted that the ciguapa was a Taíno myth that predated the Dominican Republic, and suggested that the origin of the ciguapa may be the hupia spirits of the dead from Taíno mythology. Writer Tomás Hernández Franco proposed in 1942 that the ciguanaba of mainland Latin American folklore was derived from the same indigenous seed-story as the ciguapa that had been syncretized during the history of New Spain, hence the similar name and details of the two myths: both legendary creatures are siren-like, long-haired women that seduce and kill men.

In the 21st century, the ciguapa as introduced by Francisco Javier Angulo Guridi has been contended as fakelore, an invented myth presenting itself as traditional. Historian Ginetta Candelaria suggests that Guridi could have invented the ciguapa from Cuban folklore - the Cuban historian Antonio Bachiller y Morales, contemporary to Guridi, wrote of a similar legend to the ciguapa in 1848 - and familiarity with the local name 'ciguapa.' Guridi lived in Cuba from 1822 to 1853, fleeing the Haitian occupation of Santo Domingo but returning to fight in the Dominican War of Independence; he left for Cuba again from 1855 to 1861, returning following the Spanish annexation of the Dominican Republic. Candelaria also notes that Guridi was a prominent member of the Blue Party liberals during the Second Dominican Republic, and an advocate of indigenismo, a form of ethnic nationalism: indigenists sought to establish a new Dominican common culture in opposition to the former occupier Haiti and foreign intervention from the United States and the Spanish Empire. Inventing and propagating the ciguapa legend may have served to build a sort of national symbol.

Carlos Larrazábal Blanco argued in Los Negros Y La Esclavitud En Santo Domingo (Black People and Slavery in Santo Domingo, 1975) that the ciguapa is based off the Dominican maroon-Taíno communities stemming from the rebellion of Enriquillo in the early 16th century, based in the Sierra de Baoruco. Manuel Mora Serrano further says that the back-footedness of ciguapas is in reference to maroon practice of walking backwards to obfuscate their communities from slave-hunters and colonialists. Writers including Elizabeth Acevedo, Serrano and Omaris Zamora contend that the ciguapa legend was in part intended other the maroons, presenting them as inhuman and incompatible with 'civilized' Dominican society.

== Analysis ==
Critical theory analysis of the original ciguapa myth assesses it as phallogocentric and reinforcing colonialist stereotypes of native women, particularly the Hispanic malinchism trope. When the potential maroon-focused origin of the legend is taken into account, the inherent misogynoir in turn draws comparisons of the ciguapa's sexual predation and self-destructiveness to the Jezebel stereotype.

=== Reappropriation ===
"...the ciguapa is a time being as well as timeless one. She stands at the confluence of forward and backward flows of people, items, and ideas, subverting the dichotomies of what it means to be coming and going, aquí y allá."

— Nancy Kang

Since the fall of the Trujillo regime in the 1960s, the ciguapa has been increasingly reappropriated by Dominican feminists as a cultural icon. Despite Trujillo-era (and arguably earlier) promotion of the myth to the detriment of black and indigenous Dominican women resisting mestizaje, the simultaneously traditional and counter-cultural nature of the ciguapa can be re-framed while shedding the old racialization. This post-Trujillo ciguapa is presented as a divine feminine that embodies indigeneity in opposition to colonial European values.

The creolization of the ciguapa legends allows it to be a simultaneously indigenous, Black and mestizo figure: as an indigenous figure, the ciguapa is representative of the multifaceted indigenous response to colonialism; as a Black figure, it challenges contemporary Dominican race relations; and as a mestizo and uniquely Dominican legend, the ciguapa embodies an alternative to the marianismo-malinchism dichotomy of Hispanic traditional femininity.

The ciguapa has also been adopted by women in the Dominican diaspora, particularly Dominicans in New York City, the largest community of Dominicans abroad. Dominican-American artist Firelei Báez's Ciguapa series (2005-2022) relates Dominican American women to ciguapas: Báez's artistic motive was to interrogate the ciguapa in context of Dominican femininity, indigeneity and connection to nature. Baez's poem "A 1 2 3 Portrait of a Legend" uses the ciguapa as a symbol of Dominican-American transculturation, particularly the paradox of maintaining a Dominican identity against the pressure to assimilate as an immigrant.

== In popular culture ==
The ciguapa has received particular focus from Dominican children's books writers: the Círculo Dominicano de Escritores para Niños y Jóvenes (Dominican Circle of Writers for Children and Youth, founded 1992) established a directive to re-interpret the ciguapa in a multicultural light, using the story of the misunderstood and marginalized creature to "exemplify the plight of the subaltern—mute, hidden, mysterious, Other—as well as successful subversion." Leibi Ng's 2000 book Secreto de monte (Secret of the Mountain) follows the daughter of a late ciguapa as she realizes her heritage, ultimately learning that her mother died happy knowing her infant daughter had forward-facing feet: the ambivalent ending evokes both blanqueamiento as well as the daughter's newfound desire to explore her indigeneity. In Julia Alvarez's The Secret Footprints (2002), a child ciguapa is mutually fascinated by a human boy, representing a longing for multiculturalism. César Sánchez Beras' El cemí y el fuego (The Zemi and the Fire, 2011) is a pseudo-historical retelling of the history of Quisqueya through the lens of Taino mythology, with five ciguapas being the progenitors of five chiefdoms.

Dominican musician Chichí Peralta's 1997 album Pa' Otro La'o features the track La ciguapa, which describes the creature as explicitly mestizo.

Films focusing on the ciguapa include the 2007 Dominican film El Mito de la Ciguapa (The Myth of the Ciguapa) and the 2021 short horror film La Ciguapa Siempre (The Ciguapa Forever): the latter follows a woman's story as she realizes she is a ciguapa.

The prehistoric gecko Sphaerodactylus ciguapa, discovered in El Cibao and described in 2012, was named after the ciguapa legend. The researchers Juan Daza and Aaron Bauer chose the name to evoke the location, as well as the dark coloration and twisted feet of the skeletal structure of the amber-encased gecko.

== See also ==
- Galipote, a Dominican shapeshifter
- Churel, a legendary back-footed Indian being that haunts men in the form of a beautiful woman
