= Satyress =

Mythological creature, half woman, half goat

A satyress holding two infants, by Clodion (Walters Art Museum, Baltimore)

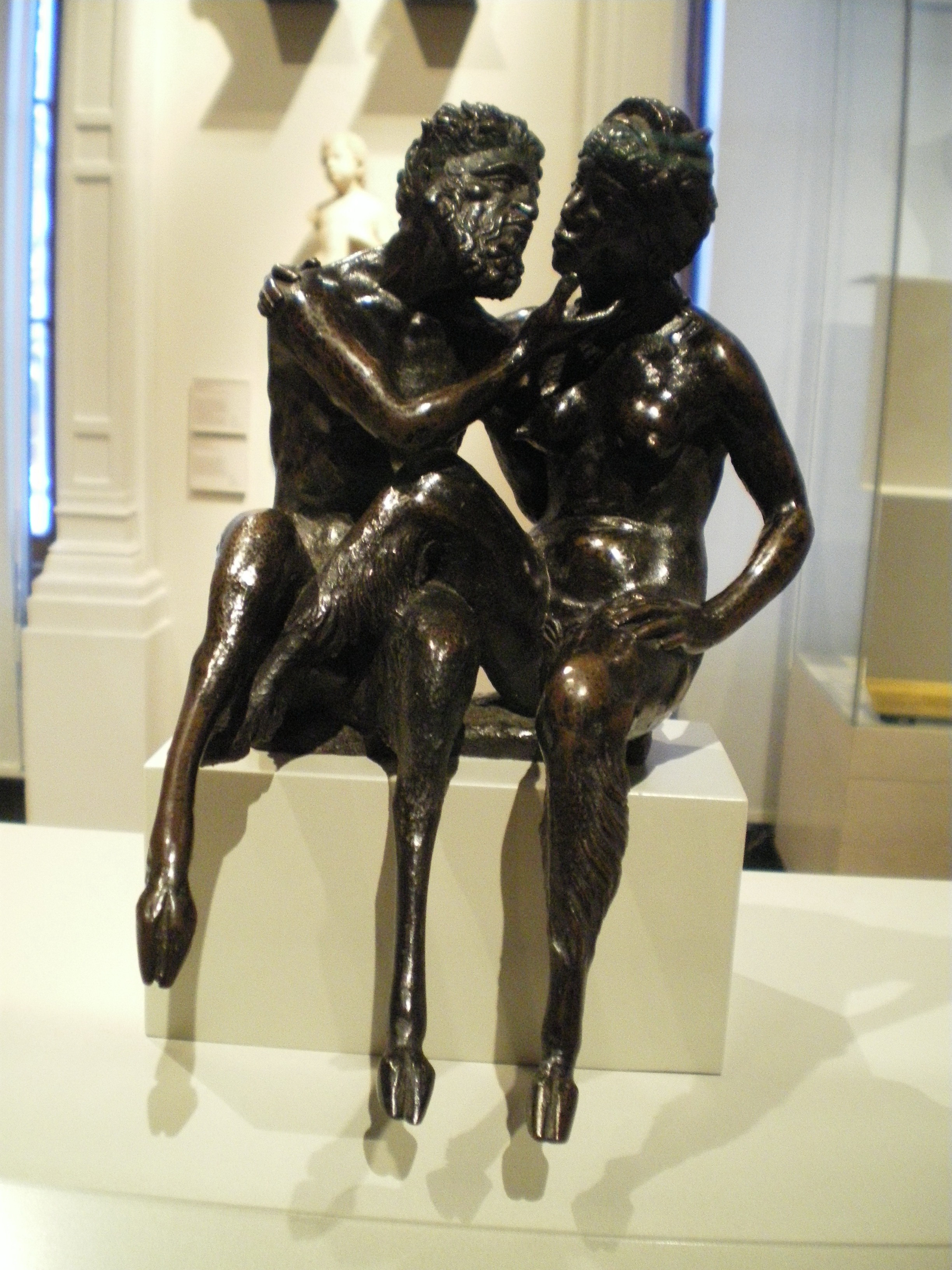
Satyr and Satyress by Andrea Briosco, Victoria and Albert Museum.

Satyress is the female equivalent to satyrs. They are entirely an invention of post-Roman European artists, as the Greek satyrs were exclusively male and the closest there was to female counterparts were the nymphs, altogether different creatures who, however, were nature spirits or deities like the satyrs. Later on, Romans described their counterpart of the satyr -- the faunus -- as having a female counterpart, the fauna. Although effectively the same creature as the then-nonexistent satyress, it actually came to be part of the Roman religion. The creation of gender-complementary pairs of deities serving the same function was a typically Roman religious characteristic.

== Description ==
Satyresses are depicted with a human head and torso, generally including bare breasts, but the body of a goat from the hips down. They were a late invention by poets and artists and are comparatively rare in Classical art. Such a creature may also be known as a fauness, but this nomenclature is rarely seen in English; faunesse is the spelling in French.

Though not often seen compared to the omnipresent depictions of male satyrs and centaurs, the satyress figure was certainly not unknown to Renaissance artists. Michelangelo included a haggard satyress nursing drunken toddlers at her elderly breasts in his 1533 work, The Children's Bacchanal.

The Art Institute of Chicago has an example of an attractive, mature satyress accompanied by putti and a male satyr in a 16th-century study by Paolo Farinati of Italy. A third satyr figure is presented in rear three-quarter view and its gender cannot be definitively determined, though the glimpse of the chest suggests small female breasts are present. The Art Institute also holds a bronze candle stand or oil lamp depicting a mature female satyr seated with her satyr son leaning against her knee while she holds a light aloft. The tentative date on this work is circa 1500, pushing the motif back into the 15th century.

Clodion used the motif in a work which is now in the Walters Art Museum in Baltimore, Maryland: Female Satyr Carrying Two Putti. This satyress is striding upright, carrying a squirming putto in each arm. At least one small terra cotta satyress depicted reclining was created by a student of Clodion in the late 18th or early 19th Century; it resides in a private collection.

Giambattista Giovanni Battista Tiepolo, an 18th-century Venetian painter in the rococo style, painted at least two works with a satyress as the main figure: Satyress with a Putto and Satyress With Two Putti and a Tambourine. Although satyrs are generally shown seducing human women, Tiepolo drew Satyr Surprising A Satyress, which depicts a hirsute satyr grasping a relatively bare-skinned satyress around the waist.

The satyress is common in modern fantasy art. They may be portrayed as normal human women with the hind legs of a goat and a tail. In modern fantasy art, they commonly are shown with pointed ears and horns as well. Aubrey Beardsley was known to depict the satyress figure in this style.

== See also ==
- Satyr
- Faun
- Glaistig
- Fauna
- Centaurides
- Maenad
- Nymph
- Dryad
