= Forgotten Island =

2026 DreamWorks Animation film

- Theatrical release poster
- Directed by: Joel Crawford; Januel Mercado
- Written by: Joel Crawford; Januel Mercado
- Produced by: Mark Swift
- Starring: H.E.R.; Liza Soberano; Dave Franco; Jenny Slate; Manny Jacinto; Dolly de Leon; Jo Koy; Ronny Chieng; Kevin McCann; Lea Salonga
- Edited by: James Ryan
- Music by: Nathan Matthew David
- Production company: DreamWorks Animation
- Distributed by: Universal Pictures
- Release dates: April 15, 2026 (CinemaCon); September 25, 2026 (United States)
- Running time: 109 minutes
- Country: United States
- Language: English
- Budget: $80 million
- Box office: $79.2 million

Forgotten Island is a 2026 American animated fantasy adventure comedy film written and directed by Joel Crawford and Januel Mercado. Produced by DreamWorks Animation, the film features the voices of H.E.R., Liza Soberano, Dave Franco, Jenny Slate, Manny Jacinto, Dolly de Leon, Jo Koy, Ronny Chieng, Kevin McCann, and Lea Salonga. Set during the 1990s in the Philippines, the story follows two best friends, Jo (H.E.R) and Raissa (Soberano), who are trapped in the mystical world of Nakali, which they have grown up hearing stories of.

DreamWorks Animation officially announced the film in April 2025, with Crawford and Mercado attached to write and direct. They drew inspiration from their friendship and Philippine mythology. Initial members of the cast were announced in October 2025, with further casting later confirmed the following March.

Following early "work-in-progress" screenings at the 2026 CinemaCon and at the 2026 Annecy International Animation Film Festival, Forgotten Island was theatrically released in the United States on September 25, 2026, by Universal Pictures. The film received largely positive reviews for its visuals and cultural representation, with some calling it one of DreamWorks Animation's best films. However, it underperformed at the box office, grossing $79.2 million worldwide against an $80 million budget.

== Plot ==
In the Philippines during the 1990s, Jo Yuson presents a story to her class about the island of Nakali (short for "nakalimutan", meaning "forgotten" in Tagalog) and the dreaded manananggal. When a classmate mocks her, Jo attacks him and is sent to the principal's office, where she meets Raissa Molina, another classmate who had defended her. Jo later invites Raissa to a sleepover with her grandmother, Fatima, who tells them about her travels to Nakali. The girls become best friends, making matching charm bracelets that represent significant moments in their friendship. Fatima later passes away from old age, leaving Jo orphaned and heartbroken.

After graduating high school, Raissa reveals that she is attending Caltech in the United States at the wishes of her parents, disappointing Jo, who is trying to make ends meet by working at a fast food restaurant. At the farewell party, Jo overhears Raissa's mother expressing disapproval over their friendship. Jo and Raissa sneak out to the beach, where Jo discovers a magical sand dollar that serves as a portal to Nakali. Despite Raissa's hesitation, they enter together, awakening the next morning with no memory of the previous night. Raissa discovers that half of her head has been shaved and she has grown wings belonging to Manang, a manananggal who attacks them. They escape with help from Batiba, a batibat who offers to send them home in exchange for their bracelets and the memories attached to them, as she perpetually stays in her cave and lives vicariously through the memories of others due to her agoraphobia. The girls refuse and flee with Raww, a were-aspin who claims to have hung out with them the previous night and becomes their guide.

At a market, the trio meet Bungi, a tiyanak who tells them that the "Jewel of the Sea" they seek was stolen by a duwende king. It is then revealed that Jo accidentally burned the chunk of Raissa’s hair the night prior. Their search leads them to Mermahn, a kataw who claims the sand dollar is in his kingdom. Feeling excluded, Raww lashes out until Jo reassures him and shares her fear of being abandoned by Raissa. Following Raww's suggestion, Jo takes them to Kapre Village, where they learn that they had previously saved the villagers from Manang, after which Raissa stole her wings. Manang attacks again, separating Bungi from the group. After escaping, the group learns that Mermahn lied about the sand dollar, while Raww reveals that he works for Batiba, who is actually a demon. He also admits that he had lured Jo and Raissa to Batiba the previous night, after which they relinquished their memories of their time in Nakali.

Batiba recaptures them and restores their memories, revealing that Jo, afraid of losing Raissa, had hidden the sand dollar after Batiba gave it to them to prevent them from being able to return home. Furious, Raissa reveals that going to Caltech was her choice and heads to find the sand dollar, ending their friendship. When she finds it, she is ambushed by Manang, who reclaims her wings, but finds out from Raissa that Batiba has stolen from her. Jo then reveals that she offered Batiba her memories of their friendship in exchange for saving her. Raissa is sent back to the Philippines, while Jo stays behind. Back on the beach, a remorseful Raissa adds a leftover firecracker to her bracelet, sending her back to Nakali. Reconciling with Raww, she enters Jo's fading memories and tearfully admits how much their friendship shaped who she is, reconciling with her. Manang arrives, and Jo and Raissa, aided by Raww, Bungi, and Mermahn, attempt to fight her, but Batiba, finally understanding the value of memories, willingly returns the ones she stole from Manang, causing her to become docile. Jo finally accepts Raissa's decision to attend college overseas, and the girls head home while Batiba finally goes outside.

A few years later, Jo visits Raissa at Caltech to promote a graphic novel she has published based on their adventures. Before Jo heads home, she and Raissa use their bracelets to reopen the portal so they can visit Nakali once more.

== Voice cast ==
- H.E.R. as Josephine "Jo" Cleopatra Yuson, Raissa's rowdy and rebellious best friend and a gifted comic-book artist
  - Kailey Crawford as young Jo
- Liza Soberano as Raissa Molina, Jo's ambitious and intelligent best friend who is initially set to leave her home in favor of attending Caltech
  - Kayla Teruel as young Raissa
- Dave Franco as Raww, a well-meaning but unlucky were-dog. According to Crawford, Raww is centuries-old being who is the only were-dog in Nakali. He had never had a connection prior to Jo and Raissa's arrival. The character is also alternatively characterized as a "were-aspin".
- Manny Jacinto as Bungi, a large tiyanak baby demon
- Jenny Slate as Batiba, a tree-dwelling batibat that specializes in memories
- Lea Salonga as Manang, the dreaded manananggal who is the most feared creature in Nakali
- Dolly de Leon as Lola Fatima Yuson, Jo's late folklore-knowing grandmother who traveled to Nakali in the past
- Jo Koy as Datu, Chief of the kapre
- Ronny Chieng as Truffle Wuffle, King of the duwende people
- Kevin McCann as Mermahn, Prince of the Kataw and the Jewel of the Sea

Additional cast members include Amielynn Abellera as Jane Molina, Raissa's mother, the film's co-director Januel Mercado as Manny Molina, Raissa's father, and Mermahn's dried up self, Eugene Cordero as Mr. Lopez, Jo and Raissa's schoolteacher, Tania Gunadi as Zippy, a potion fairy, Eric Bauza (in his final film role during his lifetime before his death the following month) as Button Wutton, General of the Duwende under Truffle Wuffle, and Nico Santos as Mermahn's Starfish Pasties. During the party scene, Kristin Villanueva voices two titas (aunts), while Nurse John voices a tito (uncle) that performs tinikling. Harvey Guillén and Wagner Moura, who previously appeared in co-director Joel Crawford's previous film Puss in Boots: The Last Wish (2022), respectively voice a tikbalang market vender and an aswang chef with a flaming head that serves spicy food to Jo and Raissa.

== Production ==
=== Development ===
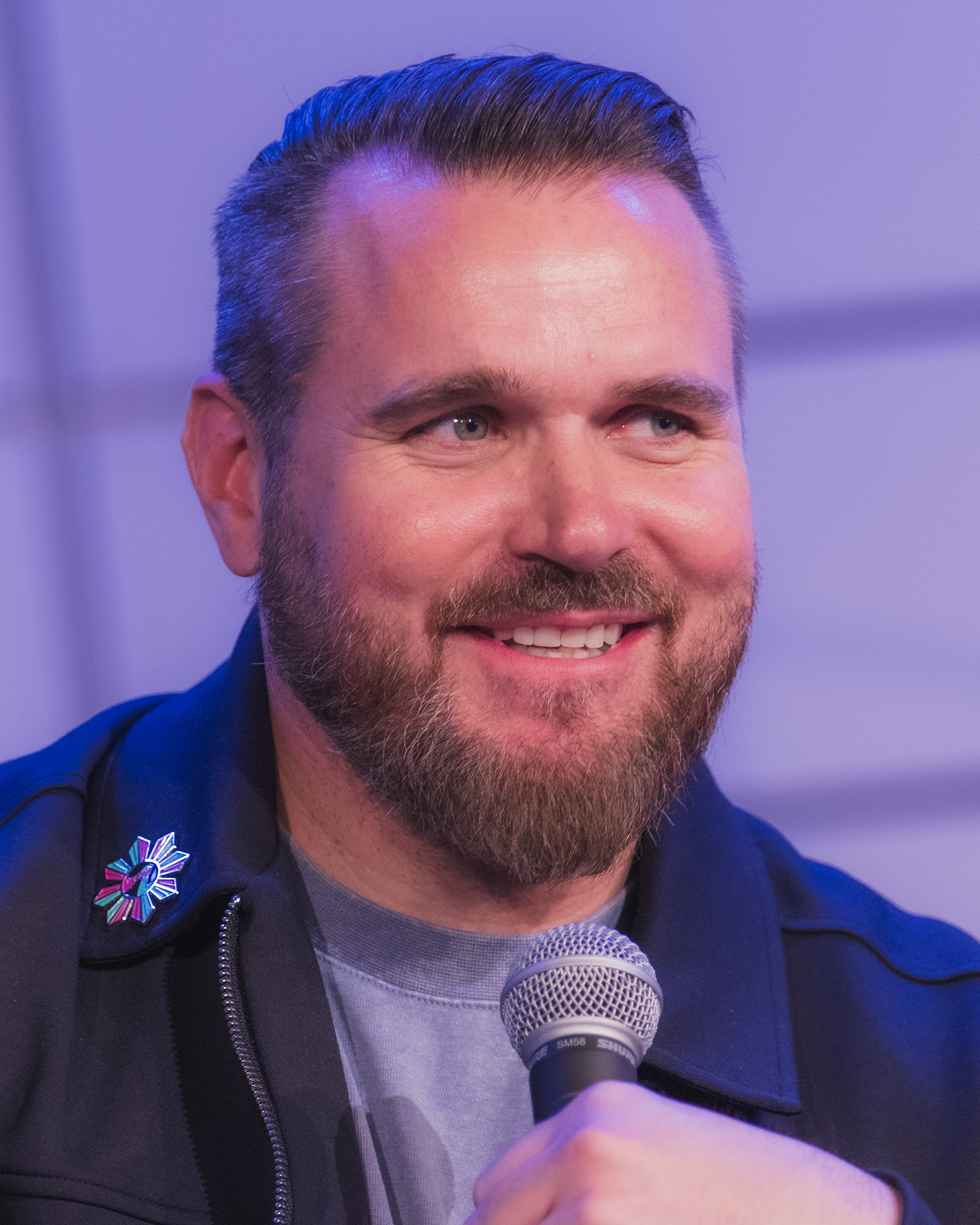
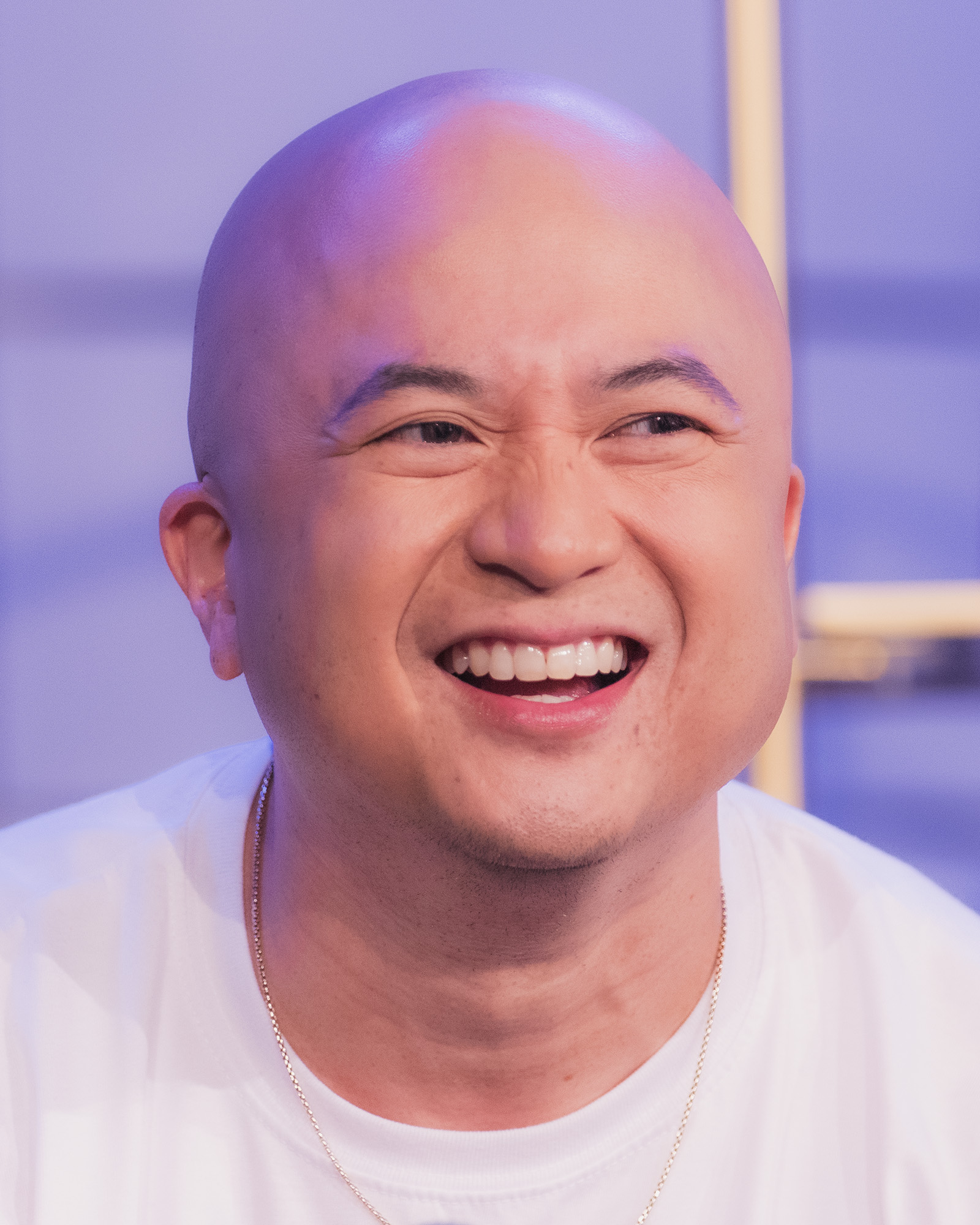
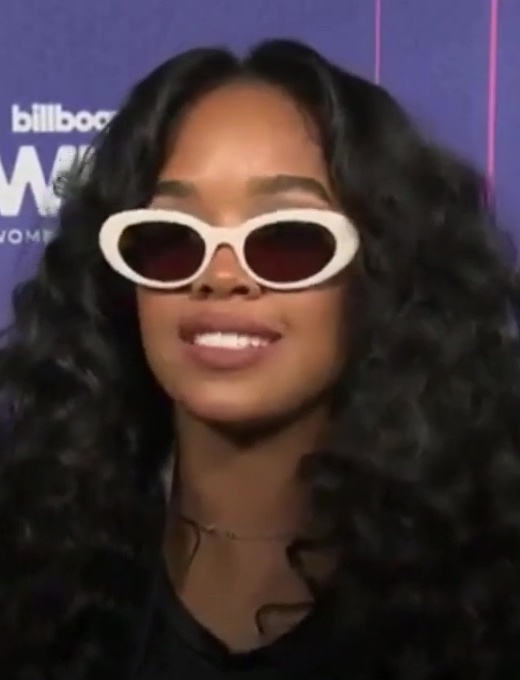
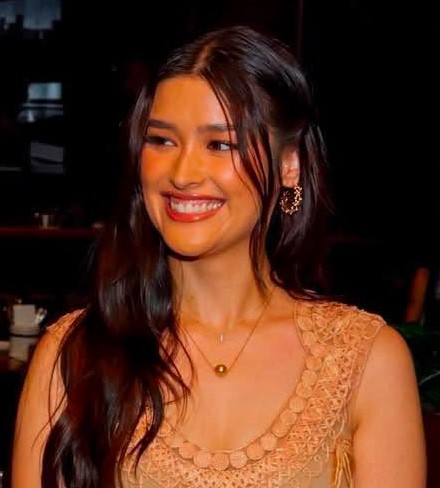
Directors Joel Crawford and Januel Mercado and stars H.E.R. and Liza Soberano.

In April 2025, DreamWorks Animation announced that an original animated adventure comedy film inspired by Philippine mythology, titled Forgotten Island, was in development, with Joel Crawford and Januel Mercado signed to direct. Crawford and Mercado, who had worked together at the studio since Kung Fu Panda 2 (2011), drew inspiration from their friendship.

=== Casting ===
Forgotten Island had a primarily Filipino and Filipino-American cast. In October 2025, H.E.R., Liza Soberano, Dave Franco, Manny Jacinto, Jenny Slate, and Lea Salonga were announced as part of the cast. In March 2026, Jo Koy, Dolly de Leon, Ronny Chieng, and Amielynn Abellera joined the cast.

Crawford and Mercado had H.E.R. in mind from the beginning for the role of Jo noting her previous work on a video for Vogue Philippines. The directors found her persona to be "cool" for her tendency to wear sunglasses while noting her bubbly demeanor when talking about Filipino food which led the duo to find H.E.R. suitable for the role of Jo. Meanwhile, Soberano, originally auditioned for the role of Jo but was invited back to try for the role of Raissa instead. Crawford and Mercado found Soberano was able to bring humor and emotion to Raissa's character. Some of Soberano's audition lines made to the final film. Salonga and de Leon were approached by the production team for their roles.

=== Animation and design ===
The film's animation style is similar to that of DreamWorks' previous film Puss in Boots: The Last Wish (2022), also directed by Crawford. Mercado and Crawford stated that the visual style was inspired by Filipino art and 1990s graphic design. The animation style varies throughout the film, periodically shifting from its primary contemporary computer-generated animation to anime-influenced 2D animation. These stylized 2D sequences are used during flashbacks, referencing the style of anime series such as Dragon Ball Z, Street Fighter, and Sailor Moon, depending on which character recalls a memory. These sequences were animated by Manila-based studio Snipple Animation, reflecting the history of Philippine studios working on outsourced anime series. At the film's Annecy presentation, the filmmakers highlighted the contributions of these Filipino animators, noting that the local culture served as the project's foundation rather than a mere influence. Sony Pictures Imageworks also assisted on the animation in some shots throughout the film.

== Music ==
In October 2025, Nathan Matthew David was announced to be composing the film's score. Composing the score for Forgotten Island, David travelled throughout the Philippines to research on different indigenous music, including by spending time in Cordillera and Kalinga, and with the T'boli people in Lake Sebu. He also recorded the Bamboo Organ, a 19th-century church pipe organ made with bamboo, in Las Piñas, Metro Manila. Musician Farid Guinomla travelled from Mindanao to play and record the gong and kulintang instruments in Los Angeles. The recording was done in Abbey Road Studios in London with the score's vocals contributed by Salonga.

The soundtrack album was released digitally by Universal's Back Lot Music label on September 18, 2026, ahead of the film's release date. It features performances by local Filipino acts Bini, Lea Salonga, SB19, Francis Magalona, Katseye's Sophia Laforteza, Ruby Ibarra, and Carl Angelo, in addition to leads H.E.R. and Liza Soberano.

== Marketing ==
The first trailer was released on March 25, 2026. On July 24, members of the cast took part in the 2026 San Diego Comic-Con to promote the film. They were joined by Bini, who performed one of the film's songs, titled "A Parallel World".

Jollibee collaborated with DreamWorks and released food offerings tied to Forgotten Island in the Philippines.

== Release ==
Forgotten Island was released in the United States on September 25, 2026. A work-in-progress cut was screened at CinemaCon in Las Vegas on April 15, 2026, and at the 2026 Annecy International Animation Film Festival in France on June 24, receiving a five-minute standing ovation at the latter festival. The film was released with limited direct competition.

=== Home media ===
Forgotten Island was released by Universal Pictures Home Entertainment on digital download on October 27, 2026, and will be released on Ultra HD Blu-ray, Blu-ray, and DVD on December 1, 2026.

== Reception ==
=== Box office ===
As of November 22, 2026, Forgotten Island has grossed $37.8 million in the United States and Canada, and $41.4 million in other territories, for a worldwide total of $79.2 million.

In the United States and Canada, Forgotten Island was released alongside Primetime, Heart of the Beast, and Avengers Endgame: Encore, and was projected to gross $15–17 million from 3,548 theaters in its opening weekend. The film made $4.3 million on its opening day, and went on to debut to $12.8 million, finishing in fifth place. The film finished in sixth place in the next two weekends, grossing $7.2 million and $4.3 million, respectively. The FranchiseRe newsletter, using the $14.6 million as the reference point, noted that Forgotten Island had a weaker than average opening gross for an original animated film from a major studio.

In the Philippines, Forgotten Island started strong with a ₱97.2 million box office gross on its opening weekend, marking the best-performing non-franchise DreamWorks Animation film of all time in the country.

=== Critical response ===
On the review aggregator website Rotten Tomatoes, 94% of 135 critics' reviews are positive, with an average rating of 7.8/10. The website's consensus reads: "A candy-colored ode to friendship and Filipino folklore, Forgotten Island bursts at the seams with imagination while never losing sight of the compelling relationship at its core." Metacritic, which uses a weighted average, assigned the film a score of 74 out of 100, based on 30 critics, indicating "generally favorable" reviews. Audiences polled by CinemaScore gave the film an average grade of "A" on an A+ to F scale, while 83% of those surveyed by PostTrak said they would definitely recommend it.

Matt Goldberg of TheWrap gave the film a three-and-a-half out of five rating and wrote, "With influences ranging from The Hangover to Eternal Sunshine of the Spotless Mind, the DreamWorks animated feature is admirably ambitious." Matt Zoller Seitz of RogerEbert.com gave the film three-and-a-half out of four rating and says: "The movie is so imaginative, energetic, and sincere that it should be fun for just about everyone."

=== Accolades ===
Award	Date of ceremony	Category	Nominee(s)	Result	Ref.
Hollywood Music in Media Awards	November 18, 2026	Best Original Song – Animated Film	"BRB" – Ryan Tedder and Gabriella Wilson	Nominated	
Hollywood Music in Media Awards	November 18, 2026	Music Video	"BRB" – Bianca Catbagan and H.E.R.	Nominated	

== Future ==
Following the release of the film, co-director Januel Mercado hinted the possibility of a follow-up, stating, "There is a bigger world with the Forgotten Island, and these characters have histories and stories that have started long before the audience goes in the theater and even before Jo and Raissa get to the island, so they're there."
