= Kapre =

Philippine mythical creature

Creature information
- Grouping: Tree creature
- Similar entities: Agta

Origin
- Region: Philippines

A kapre is a mythical creature with a human-like appearance that is often described as a tree giant, being a tall, dark-coloured, hairy, and muscular creature. In Philippine folklore, kapres are giants that often dwell atop fruitless tree branches and smoke large cigars, behaving mischievously but benignly around nearby travelers.

== Origins ==
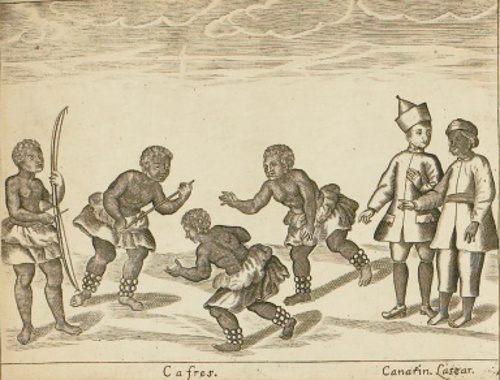
Detail of Carta Hydrographica y Chorographica de la Yslas Filipinas (1734) by Pedro Murillo Velarde showing Negrito tribesmen, labelled as "Cafres"

The term kapre comes from the Arabic kafir (Spanish cafre), meaning a non-believer in Arabic (usually referring to atheists/idolists). The term was later brought to the Philippines by the Spanish who had previous contact with the Moors, they used it to describe the indigenous Negrito ethnic groups with dark skin and features similar to Black Africans. This is also apparent in the fact that a synonym for kapre is agtà, another name for the Aeta people. The modern mythical characterizations of the kapre evolved from formerly racially prejudiced portrayals of Negrito tribes by the lowland Christianized ethnic groups of the Philippines during the Spanish period.

The first attestation of the use of the term was chapri, by Antonio Pigafetta of the Magellan expedition. They were described by the people of Suluan to the Magellan crew as dark-skinned, tattooed, and wore barkcloth (except for chieftains who wore a cloth headdress of silk), and had weapons ornamented with gold and large shields.

The term cafre was also used for Papuan slaves brought to the Philippines by the Portuguese before slavery was abolished by Spain.

== Folk beliefs ==
=== Behavior ===
Kapres are believed to be nocturnal and omnivorous. They are not necessarily considered to be evil. However, they may turn vengeful when the tree that they are inhabiting is cut down.

A Kapre may approach people to form a friendship or when it becomes attracted to a woman. If a Kapre befriends a human, especially because of love, the Kapre will drive them away because of his negative aura and still try to consistently follow its "love interest" throughout life. Additionally, those who are believed to be friends with a Kapre are said to gain the ability to see the creature. If such a person sits on the Kapre, others may also become capable of seeing the otherwise hidden giant entity.

Kapres, also called agtà, are said to play pranks on people, frequently making travelers become disoriented and lose their way in the mountains or in the woods. They are also believed to possess the ability to confuse people, even when they are in their own familiar surroundings.; for instance, someone who forgets that they are in their own garden or home is said to have been tricked by a Kapre. Reports of experiencing Kapre enchantment include that of witnessing rustling tree branches, even if the wind is not strong. Some more examples would be hearing loud laughter coming from an unseen being, witnessing thick smoke from the top of a tree, seeing big red glaring eyes during night time from a tree, as well as actually seeing a Kapre walking in forested areas. It is also believed that abundant fireflies in woody areas are the embers from the Kapre's lit cigars or tobacco pipe. Tabacco is a substance domesticated in the Caribbean and Latin America.

=== Natural habitat and attire ===
Kapres are said to dwell in big trees like acacias, mangoes, bamboo, and banyan (known in the Philippines as balete). It is also commonly observed sitting beneath those trees. The Kapre is said to wear the indigenous Northern Philippine loincloth known as bahag, and according to some, often wears a belt which gives the kapre the ability to be unseen to humans. In some versions, the kapre is supposed to hold a magical white stone, a little smaller in size than a quail egg. Should any person happen to obtain this stone, the kapre can grant wishes.

In a 1955 article about the creatures of Philippine mythology, painter Carlos "Botong" Francisco described the kapre as "a giant with an ugly face and hairy arms, who dwells in lightning-scarred acacia or fruitless mango."

== In modern culture ==
In the 1950s, among the earliest issues of the Darna superhero comics by Mars Ravelo and Nestor Redondo featured a kapre being fought by the titular superhero.

In the 2000 romantic drama film Pangarap ng Puso directed by Mario O'Hara, a kapre appears sporadically in the film amidst scenes of political turmoil.

Other films and television series that depicted the kapre are listed below:

- Kamakalawa (lit. 'Day before yesterday'), a 1982 epic fantasy film written, produced and directed by Eddie Romero
- Ang Pamana: The Inheritance, a 2006 Philippine horror film written and directed by Romeo Candido
- Ang Panggagahasa kay Fe (lit. 'The rape of Fe'), a 2009 drama film written and directed by Alvin Yapan
- "The Kapre", a 2022 American episode of the Hulu horror anthology series Bite Size Halloween

== See also ==
- Aswang
- Manananggal
- Ghosts in Filipino culture
- Tikbalang
- Nephilim
- Troll
