= Ang Pamana: The Inheritance =

2006 Filipino supernatural thriller film

Inheritance
- Poster
- Directed by: Romeo Candido
- Written by: Romeo Candido; Carmen De Jesus; Ria Limjap
- Produced by: JoAnn Cabalda Banaga; Caroline Mangosing
- Starring: Phoemela Baranda; Victor Neri; Nicco Lorenzo Garcia; Caroline Mangosing; Nadine Villasin; Dariel Gamotin
- Cinematography: Odyssey Flores
- Edited by: Romeo Candido
- Music by: Gerard Salonga
- Production companies: The Digital Sweatshop Inc.; Global Reach Canada; The Digital Sweatshop Inc.
- Distributed by: Solar Entertainment
- Release dates: November 22, 2006 (Philippines); October 22, 2006 (US)
- Countries: Philippines; Canada
- Language: Filipino

Ang Pamana: The Inheritance is a 2006 Filipino supernatural thriller film.

Romeo Candido directed and wrote the script for the film while his wife Caroline Mangosing produced it. Carmen De Jesus and Ria Limjap were credited as screenwriters. It stars Phoemela Baranda, Victor Neri, Nicco Lorenzo Garcia, Caroline Mangosing, Nadine Villasin and Dariel Gamotin.

The film was shot in Canada and the Philippines, and it premiered at the Louis Vuitton Hawaii International Film Festival. It was released theatrically in the Philippines in November 2006.

The film is based on traditional Filipino folklore, and mentions creatures such as duwende, manananggal, and kapre.

== Plot ==
Canada-based siblings Anna and Johnny are asked by their dad to attend the wake of their grandmother Nena and to represent their family in the reading of her will in Manila. Together with their cousin, Vanessa, they inherit Nena's farm in Bulacan. The three of them get along, especially Johnny and Vanessa due to their shared vice. Johnny also gets along with Nena's adoptive autistic grandson, Tommy, who also inherits part of the same property. Mang Dante and Celia act as caretakers of the property and live with the inheritors.

Vanessa takes the siblings to the marketplace, where a mysterious old woman briefly touches Anna's belly, and later the whole property together with Tommy. She also shows them her very own marijuana plantation there, which she believes will make them a fortune. Anna and Johnny are hesitant, but Vanessa says no one dares to enter the farm as locals believe supernatural entities are inhabiting it, keeping the stash a secret. Vanessa herself does not believe the tales.

While checking out a particular mango tree nearby, Tommy appears to be talking to someone up there. Johnny, who records their travel, catches something peculiar on tape. Through either his dreams or drug-induced stupor, Johnny recalls some details of his time with Nena as a kid. She mainly shares with him the tale of the manananggal a winged man-eating monster. It is revealed that he and Nena saw it in the said property at least once and that she had warned him never to enter the wooded area there. She also says that one day, he will set things right. Throughout their stay, the house is slowly revealed to be haunted by Nena's spirit, which makes its presence felt by the trio, although Johnny dismisses his experiences. Tommy is shown to have the ability to "see" the ghost, as well as some other entities that dwell in the land.

The next day, Vanessa and her friends Ronnie, Paolo, and Nico harvest some of their plants. Along the way, Ronnie and Nico litter, urinate, and spit on some mounds believed to be inhabited by elves. On the way back, Ronnie and Nico's motorcycles mysteriously stall, prompting Vanessa and Paolo to go ahead back to the house. Tommy finds and plays with Johnny's drugs, but the latter does not find out. He is then forced to go sober for some time. Meanwhile, Ronnie gets his motorcycle to start u and leaves Nico behind. As Nico walks back to the house, he notices the mango tree and throws rocks at it to get some of its fruits. He also sees cigars placed by Mang Dante near its base as an offering and takes some, angering an unseen entity. Johnny reviews his footage from earlier by the same tree showing a kapre, a tall hairy tree spirit that is benevolent to those who respect it but malevolent to those who are not. Anna is revealed to be eight weeks pregnant, but not considering marrying her boyfriend. Johnny expresses his support for his sister.

That night, Nico fails to return. Tommy keeps saying that he's dead, but no one takes heed. Johnny suggests they search for him, but Paolo advises against roaming the farm at that time. Ronnie suddenly becomes very sick. In the morning, Paolo hires an albularyo to cure Ronnie who has fallen victim to the curse of a black dwarf. After she succeeds, Vanessa then hires her to exorcise Nena's spirit from the house. Paolo goes home. Although the albularyo advises against this, Vanessa insists the exorcism proceeds now that she is the current owner of the property.

Johnny finds Tommy talking to someone at a shrine outside the house. He briefly catches a glimpse of Nena (whose ghost he now believes he has been seeing after he sees her again in his sober state) and gets Anna to the spot, who confirms she is able to feel a presence and smell her perfume but doesn't see her. Tommy then states that Nena told him to go to the mango tree and runs off. Johnny follows, leaving Anna at the shrine. Shortly afterward, Anna is attacked by the human form of the manananggal while Tommy and Johnny find Nico's body by the tree.

That night, Ronnie and Vanessa decide to have Tommy locked up at the barn as they believe it was him and not a kapre that killed Nico despite Johnny's footage showing the kapre. Mang Dante asks Johnny to come with him to the mango tree immediately. As Mang Dante places offerings, Johnny again sees the kapre through his videocam's night vision. Mang Dante comes back and says the kapre wants to talk to his grandmother's descendant. Johnny is reluctant because he is afraid and cannot speak Tagalog but Mang Dante encourages him, saying that entities do not use words to communicate. Johnny offers cigars, and the kapre shows him a vision of a manananggal's lair in the forest, which Nena intended to get rid of but was unable to.

At the barn, Celia tries to unlock the doors to let Tommy out. His noise attracts the manananggal, forcing Celia to retreat. It terrorizes Tommy for some time. Back at the house, Anna wakes up in her room and hears Tommy's cries. She asks Ronnie and Vanessa to help her get him but they refuse and reveal that the manananggal is outside. She goes out, only to find the creature at the treetops nearby. The three of them shut all the windows and doors, while the manananggal flies around.

Johnny can find the manananggal's lair and throws salt all over its lower body half hidden there to prevent the creature from merging its flying part to its lower body. Realizing that the flying part is not nearby, he quickly goes back to Mang Dante who is at the mango tree and they hurry back to the house. Celia can free Tommy from the barn. They run back to the house to help Anna. Vanessa tells Ronnie that the manananggal is after Anna only and that they can escape. Ronnie reluctantly goes, but not before handing Anna a machete. They leave Anna behind.

The manananggal finally enters the house and gets the unborn child out of Anna using its tongue. Unable to fly indoors, it slowly crawls to finish off Anna. Celia and Tommy arrive and splash salt all over the creature, hurting it and momentarily paralyzing it. Johnny arrives and then throws a net to prevent it from flying. Mang Dante sets it on fire, which later burns down the whole house. The five of them escape before it collapses. As Ronnie drives away on his motorcycle, Vanessa spots a white lady by the side of the road. They pass her by a few times, after which Ronnie begins seeing it too. The white lady, revealed to be Nena's spirit which she had evicted, suddenly appears in the middle of the road. They crash, killing Vanessa. Ronnie walks away dazed and heavily injured.

Johnny, Mang Dante, Celia and Tommy work to rebuild the house. It is implied that Johnny will stay at the farm to take care of it. He and Tommy offer flowers at the shrine, which has pictures of Nena and Vanessa. As they walk away, Vanessa's vengeful spirit appears behind them.

== Cast ==
- Darrel Gamotin as Johnny, a rebellious young Pinoy from Canada who is initially reluctant to go to the Philippines. He barely remembers his time in the Philippines, and neither speaks nor understands Tagalog.
- Nadine Villasin as Anna, Johnny's prissy older sister who accompanies him to the Philippines. Unlike her brother, she doesn't lose sight of her heritage.
- Phoemela Baranda as Vanessa, Anna, and Johnny's cousin. She's a Manila junior socialite who shares Johnny's taste for drugs and trouble.
- Nicco Lorenzo Garcia as Tommy, Lola's adoptive autistic grandson. He's usually at the receiving end of Vanessa's ire and the butt of her friends' jokes. Johnny develops a positive bond with him.
- Nonie Buencamino as Mang Dante, the family driver/helper. He appears to be able to "see" and "talk" to the entities in the land, similar to Tommy.
- Susan Africa as Celia, Tommy's nanny. She genuinely cares for Tommy and goes to great lengths to ensure his well-being.
- Caroline Mangosing as Lola Nena, or simply Lola. She had an exceptionally close relationship with Johnny during his younger years.
- Victor Neri as Ronnie, a local drug dealer and Vanessa's friend.
- Cholo Barretto as Paolo, one of Vanessa's friends. He's the one with the least air in their circle.
- Ketchup Eusebio as Nico, one of Vanessa's friends. He's the one with the worst attitude in their circle. He also tends to pick on Tommy.
- Shamaine Centenera-Buencamino as Martha, Vanessa's mother.
- Gamaliel Viray as Lawyer, Lola Nena's lawyer who shared their inheritance for the three grandchildren.
- Malou Crisologo as Albularya
- Ces Aldaba as Mariano
- Raul Dillo as Kapre
- Lani Tapia as Manananggal
- Joshua Young as young Johnny
- Kryx San Gabriel as Jun
- Rose Constantino as Girlie

Cameos include Tirso Cruz III and Jacklyn Jose as Mr. and Ms. de Jesus-Reyes, Johnny and Anna's parents, Alan Paule as Lolo Ramon, the siblings' grandfather, and Angel Aquino as Ruby, A grandfather's mistress.

== Music ==
The original theme is composed by the writer/director/editor Romeo Candido. The original soundtrack is also music by Romeo Candido. The rest of the score is by Gerard Salonga, and the score is recorded with the Global Studio Orchestra in Manila, Philippines. Samples of the music are available from the official website . Gerard Salonga has worked with artists such as Lea Salonga (his sister) and Martin Nievera. He has also arranged and conducted the Philippine Philharmonic Orchestra and Manila Philharmonic Orchestra.
