= XDP =

XDP may refer to:

- eXpress Data Path, high-performance data path merged into the Linux kernel
- XML Data Package, XML file format created by Adobe Systems in 2003
- X-linked dystonia parkinsonism, rare x-linked progressive movement disorder
