= Mandurugo =

Mythical being from Philippine folklore

The Mandurugo is a mythical being from Philippine folklore, similar to a vampire.

A variety of Aswang (Filipino shapeshifter), the Mandurugo resembles a vampire. They are usually young and beautiful women by day, but develop wings and long, sharp tongues by night, which they use to either make cuts in a man's neck, or prick the inside of his mouth while kissing him to obtain blood. The stories, popular to Tagalog and Bicol speakers, have many variations. Sometimes the Mandurugo marries unsuspecting men to prey upon them, or may just select one husband, using him as a cover for her blood drinking activities, flying to other villages to feed.

== Legend ==
"The Girl With Many Loves" is one popular tale. A young, beautiful woman marries at age sixteen. Her husband, described as an over-weight youth, withers away to bones in less than a year. After he dies, the woman marries again and again with the same result, until she reaches her fourth husband. The fourth husband, fearing the same fate as his predecessors, is afraid to sleep at night and holds a knife in his hand. A little after midnight, the man senses something over him before feeling a prick on his neck. He stabs at the creature on top of him and hears a loud screech and the flapping of wings. The next day, his wife is found dead not far from the house with a knife wound in her chest.

== Films ==
In post World War II Philippines, vampirism was a hot topic. The Roman Catholic Church had a major influence on the film industry all over the globe. Films such as The Vampire People (1966) were the product of vampire folklore and mainstream culture.

== See also ==
- Kinnara
- Manananggal
- Wakwak
- Aswang
- Harpy
- Karura
- Vampire
