= Juan Cruz =

Juan Cruz may refer to:

== Where Cruz is a surname ==
- Juan Cruz (baseball) (born 1978), Dominican pitcher
- Juan Cruz (director) (born 1966), Spanish screenwriter and film director
- Juan Cruz (footballer, born 1992), Spanish footballer
- Juan Cruz (footballer, born 2000), Spanish footballer
- Juan Cruz Martínez (1952–2026), Mexican politician from Durango
- Juan Aubín Cruz Manzano (born 1948), Puerto Rican politician and mayor of Manatí from 1977 to 2016
- Juan R. Cruz (born 1946), Puerto Rican aerospace engineer at the National Aeronautics and Space Administration

== Where Cruz is a given name ==
- Juan Cruz Alli (born 1942), Spanish politician, twice President of Navarre
- Juan Cruz Álvarez (born 1985), Argentine race car driver
- Juan Cruz Bolado (born 1997), Argentine footballer
- Juan Cruz Cigudosa (born 1964), Spanish politician, Secretary of State for Science, Innovation and Universities
- Juan Cruz Real (born 1976), Argentine footballer and manager

== See also ==
- Juan de la Cruz – Juan dela Cruz (disambiguation)
