= Aswang =

Philippine mythical creature

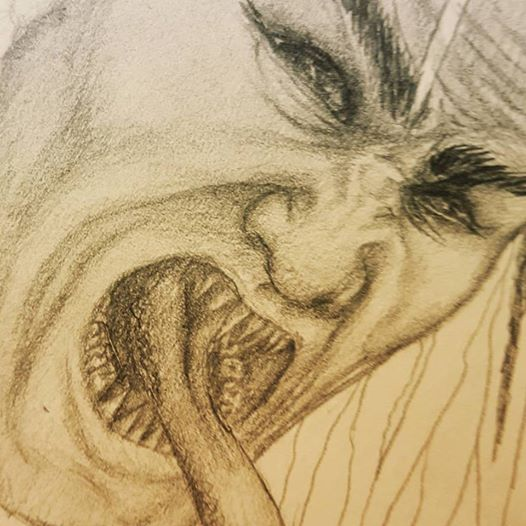
- An artist's sketch depicting the aswang

Creature information
- Grouping: A vampiric werebeast or cannibalistic human-like shape-shifter
- Similar entities: Tik-tik/Wakwak

Origin
- Region: Visayas, southern parts of Luzon and parts of Mindanao

Aswang is a general term used to describe various evil and malevolent shape-shifting creatures found in Filipino folklore, such as vampires, ghouls, witches, viscera suckers, and transforming human-beast hybrids (usually dogs, cats, pigs). The aswang is the subject of a wide variety of myths, stories, arts, and films, as it is well known throughout the Philippines. Spanish colonists noted that the aswang was the most feared among the mythical creatures of the Philippines, even in the 16th century. Although with no specific motive other than harming others, their behavior can be interpreted as an inversion of the traditional Filipino values. The aswang is especially popular in the southern parts of Luzon, and some parts of Mindanao and Visayas, especially the Visayan province of Capiz.

== Etymology ==
Aswang is derived from Greater Central Philippine *aswang ("vampire," "evil spirit," or "witch"). Its cognates include Cebuano, Aklanon, Bikol, and Kapampangan aswang; Tagalog aswang, asuwang, or uswang; Maranao ansoang ("demon witch"); Mansaka asoang ("demon"); and Sangir ansuang ("giant"). It is also believed to be the origin of the Eastern Indonesian beliefs in suangi (also keswange or iwangi; "evil spirit," "witch," or "ghost").

== Historical accounts ==
"The sixth was called silagan, whose office it was, if they saw anyone clothed in white, to tear out his liver and eat it, thus causing his death. This, like the preceding, was in the island of Catanduanes. Moreover, no one should regard this as merely a fable, for in Calavan, the intestines of a Spanish notary were reportedly pulled out through the anus in this manner. He was later buried in Calilaya by Father Fray Juan de Mérida.

The seventh was called manananggal, and his purpose was to show himself at night to many persons, without his head or entrails. According to the account, the devil was able to separate and carry his head to various places, or merely made it appear as though he had done so. By morning, he would return or reattach the head to his body, which remained alive and seemingly unharmed throughout the ordeal. This appears to be a fable, although the natives claim to have witnessed it, perhaps because they were led to believe it by the devil. This occurs in Catanduanes.

The eighth creature was referred to as the osuang, a term equivalent to “sorcerer.” According to the account, people claimed to have witnessed this being flying through the air, attacking and killing men, and consuming their flesh. This was found among the Visayan Islands, while such beliefs did not exist among the Tagalogs."

— Fr. Juan de Plasencia, Customs of the Tagalogs (1589)

== Description and taxonomy ==
According to Maximo Ramos, the term "aswang" can be thought of as an aggregate term for a multitude of Filipino supernatural creatures. These creatures can be organized into five categories that parallel creatures from Western traditions. These categories are the vampire, the self-segmenting viscera sucker, the weredog, the witch, and the ghoul.

=== The vampire ===
The vampire aswang assumes the appearance of a beautiful woman. It shares a diet of blood with vampires from Western cultures; however, it differs in that it sucks blood using a proboscis-like tongue rather than sharpened teeth. Furthermore, aswang does not reside in tombs. Some live in forests far from human communities, but the aswang can infiltrate human society by marrying into a community, either slowly draining their husband of blood or using him strictly as a hideout and leaving at night to raid other villages, thereby maintaining their cover. One example of a vampire aswang is the Tagalog mandurugo, said to live in the region of Capiz.

=== The viscera sucker ===
The viscera sucker, also known as a manananggal, is said to have a diet of internal organs or the phlegmatic discharge of the sick. Like the vampire aswang, it consumes its food with its tongue, which is narrow and tubular but not pointed like that of the vampire. By day, it takes the shape of an attractive, light-skinned, and long-haired woman. At night, it grows wings and segments itself, leaving behind its body from the waist downwards. It takes great care to hide its lower half, then flies in searches for victims. It is particularly attracted to fetuses developing inside pregnant women.Viscera suckers are said to live in domiciles deep in the jungle, if not the trees themselves. But like the vampire aswang, most infiltrate human communities via marriage.

=== The weredog ===
Maximo Ramos refers to this category as the weredog, though the creature does not necessarily transform into a dog. Ramos reasons that the creature of a given region is named after their most ferocious creature. As such, for example, Europe has werewolves, India has weretigers, and Africa has wereleopards. The Philippines has no indigenous wolf population, thus making weredog the more appropriate term. Like the previous aswang, the weredog infiltrates villages and turns into a creature at night, around midnight. The creature is most commonly a dog, but a cat or pig is also possible. The weredog then kills and eats people, particularly pregnant women on the road at night, and does not let their long hair hang loose. (Doing so is said to protect against these aswang.) The weredog is said to develop a taste for human flesh by eating food spat on, or licked, by another weredog. (The same is said of the viscera sucker.) Unlike the previous aswang, the weredog does not infiltrate human communities through marriage, but as a traveler of some sort, such as a peddler or a construction labourer.

=== The witch ===
Witch aswangs are characterized by extreme vindictiveness; they curse those who have crossed them by causing objects such as rice, bones, or insects to emerge from their victims' bodily orifices. They possess eyes that reflect images upside down and have elongated irises, and they dwell on the outskirts of towns and villages. In the Philippines, these witches are feared, shunned, and hated. A woman can become an aswang only if she already possesses certain traits associated with aswangs. Upon transformation, her powers intensify, making her even more formidable than other witches. If an aswang is captured, she is executed immediately without question. Ordinary witches, by contrast, are simply avoided and regarded with fear; however, if an incident occurs near a witch's residence, the community may seek her out to blame and punish.

=== The ghoul ===
Ghoul aswang are described as humanoid but generally concealed. Their diet consists of human corpses; they are carrion-eaters. Their nails and teeth are sharp and strong to help with the theft and consumption of the corpses. Their diet makes them smell rank and pungent. They gather in trees near cemeteries to exhume and consume the fresh burials.

== Folk beliefs ==
=== Behavior ===
Aswangs commonly dwell at night in locations such as cemeteries and woods, as their powers are significantly, or sometimes totally, reduced during the daytime. However, despite being described as wild monsters that often live in the wilderness and outskirts of society, aswang are also described as creatures that are capable of living within close proximity of or even within the confines of a village, leading to several reports of aswang attacks within large, populated towns and cities. Their ability to adapt and live within the urban and rural environments populated by humans while still maintaining their feral, monstrous nature is cited as a feature that distinguishes aswang from most other monsters. Aswang also generally have a fear of light. Wakes were often brightly lit to ensure that aswang would not come to the funeral to steal and devour the corpse. They also have a disdain for noise, but on rare occasions, described as aswang attending noisy parties.

Aswang are traditionally described as one-dimensional monsters and inherently evil by nature, with no explicable motives beyond harming and devouring other creatures. Their overtly evil behaviour may be described as an reversal of traditional Filipino values. Traditional aswang have no bias when selecting their prey and will not hesitate to target their own kin: an inversion of the traditional Filipino value of strong kinship and family closeness. Aswang are described as being unclean and favoring raw human meat over the food found in traditional Filipino culture. The aswang are also often described as lewd in behaviour, with female aswang often exposing their genitals to contrast with the values of traditional modesty.

==== Protection ====
There are several remedies and countermeasures to drive away or slay aswang. The different countermeasures often vary depending on the cultural and symbolic significance of each tool. Holy objects, spices, salt, ash, the tail of a stingray, large crustaceans, vinegar, betel nut chew, and urine are all listed as tools for protection against aswang. The reversal of a ladder leading to the house was also said to be a countermeasure against aswang.

Because aswang were believed to be the cause of miscarriages, countermeasures to drive aswang away and prevent them from prowling during childbirth were developed. One method is for the husband of the child-bearing wife to remain under the house naked while furiously waving a sword. Sharp sticks or bolos should be inserted between the bamboos of the house floor to prevent aswang from lurking under the house. Additionally, sick people should not stay in houses with holes and are told not to groan in order not to attract aswang.

There is also a special anti-aswang oil that can be developed. To make this oil, select a particular coconut and watch it grow. Pick it at twilight during a full moon when it is wet and gloomy; the breeze should also be chilly. The coconut should be grated, and its juice must be squeezed out. Boil the mixture until it becomes oil. Recite secret prayers and throw all the waste into the ocean so that aswang cannot trace whoever made the oil. Once complete, the oil should be hung at the door of the house; it will boil when an aswang is near.

There are other methods of detecting aswang without the use of the special oil. Scratching noises heard from the ceiling of a house are often a sign of a nearby aswang. An aswang in disguise can be detected by seeing if your reflection in the creature's eye is inverted. Additionally, dogs, cats, and pigs with no tails are said to be aswang in disguise. During holy masses, aswang will also attempt to dodge the blessings.

To kill a witch aswang, a bolo knife can be used to strike the middle of the witch's back; if that area is not struck, the witch can lick its wounds to heal its injuries. After slaying an aswang with a bolo, the bolo must be planted under the ground. Firearms are not advised for killing aswang, and it is useless to stab and slash at an aswang while it is in the form of an animal. Magic prayers can be used to make the aswang vulnerable; while it is in this helpless state, its body must be cut into pieces. If the aswang is cut into two pieces, each piece must be separated and taken to opposite river banks.

=== Origins and influences ===
Because of the archipelagic geography of the Philippines and the primarily oral mode of inheriting and imparting narratives from the past for preservation or didactic purposes, stories about the aswang have evolved and adapted according to the locality in question.

The aswang was born out of Philippine folklore, with stories of this terrifying creature dating back to at least the 16th century, when Spanish colonizers created the first written record of the monster. The Spanish noted that of all the monsters in their folklore, the aswang was the most feared by native people. One of the most famous origins of the term aswang came from the aswang tradition in the Bicol region during the sixteenth century. The Bicolanos believed in the God named Gugurang, who was the good God that acted as the beneficent of their region, the defender and guardian of their homes, and their protector against the evil of the God Asuang. The God Asuang, however, was the evil God and rival, who attempted to always cause harm to Gugurang and found pleasure in doing so. Gugurang was always praised by the Bicolanos, and Asuang shunned and cursed.

However, in another story, Gugurang is portrayed as a fire-wielding God who, if displeased with the humans, would cause Mt. Mayon to erupt. The aswang had no control over the people and became jealous of Gugurang's power. As the aswang begged for Gugurang's fire, Gugurang felt that the aswang was only trying to have fire to win the favor of the people, and the two began to argue for centuries. But the aswang was able to steal fire by turning himself invisible and hiding the fire in a coconut shell. However, the aswang was unable to control the power and caused the entire world to catch fire. Gugurang followed the flames, which led him to the aswang and took the fire back. He called the Gods to help him put out the fire with rain and take revenge on the aswang by making thunder and lightning strike the mountains. The act brought all the evils and destruction in the land, which the people had never forgotten the aswang for.

==== Home of the aswang ====
Aswang are most commonly associated with the province of Capiz, which lies on the island of Panay at the Western Visayas region, so much so that Capiz has come to be dubbed as the creature's "hometown". In an April 29, 2019, documentary of Kapuso Mo, Jessica Soho (KMJS), aswang are also allegedly sighted in Himamaylan, Negros Occidental, which also lies in Western Visayas, where several residents have been reportedly terrorized by the appearance of the aswang at night. The KMJS team tried to substantiate the resident's claim by installing cameras to capture the alleged creature, but to no avail.

From the lens of social anthropology, what inspired the legends of the aswang can be traced back to two possible sources: the behaviour of the wildlife within the region, and the prominence of X-linked dystonia parkinsonism within the region.

===== Wildlife behaviour =====
Sounds attributed to the aswang's hunting calls ("tiktik" and "wakwak") are similar to the sounds of nocturnal forest wildlife such as bats and Philippine flying lemurs (which are locally called kagwang). The sounds they make have resulted in them being hunted, under the suspicion that these creatures are aswang in disguise.

===== Prominence of X-linked dystonia parkinsonism =====
X-linked dystonia parkinsonism (XDP) is a genetic form of dystonia found almost entirely among males of Filipino descent (XDP Canada). It is also known as the Dystonia of Panay, due to the fact that most current cases today can be traced back to a common ancestor in Panay. According to the most recent studies, 93% of current cases today are located on Panay Island, with 63% of those being located in Capiz.

Individuals diagnosed with this disease exhibit debilitating symptoms that put them in a "transforming state", which results in their "bodies twisting, tongues protruding from their mouths, [and] salivating." With the disorder being endemic to the region for generations, the visible symptoms have been interpreted as a major contribution to the prevalence of narratives surrounding Capiz as the home of the aswang. Individuals afflicted with this disease are branded as aswang and are socially ostracized, which prevents their families from seeking effective medical treatment and forces them to isolate themselves from the larger community.

== Influences in contemporary society ==
The folklore of the aswang has been interpreted as having influenced certain idiosyncrasies of the Filipino people. Maximo Ramos, focusing on the ghoul-aspect and viscera-sucker aspect of the aswang, proposes that certain behaviours of modern-day Filipinos can be traced back to older traditions and customs that were geared towards protecting themselves from the aswang. Some of the contemporary behaviours he mentions include:

- The vociferous nature of Filipino gatherings, as compared to the solemn and subdued natures of other ethnic groups. This is most obvious when Filipinos meet with each other in non-Philippine settings.
- The floors are not swept while the dead is lying in state, for sweeping the floor would spread the scent of death around the area, which would attract ghouls.
- A chicken whose jugular vein is cut is tossed down the steps and is allowed to flutter away and die while the dead is carried out of the house. The chicken would serve as a distraction for the ghouls.
- In some parts of Luzon, orphans wear red strips of cloth around their wrists, necks, and waists, since red represents fire, a common countermeasure against ghouls. This can explain why "peasant Filipinos" prefer the red clothing, which is seen in their dances and in their costumes. (The ghouls have acute hearing but blurred vision.)
- Widows and widowers do not marry for at least a year after the spouse's death, for the new spouse may be mistaken for the old one. This fact explains the unpopularity of the recently widowed in tradition-bound communities.
- Phrases meant to identify that the speaker is not an aswang, and to announce one's presence to spirits, are still common in the Philippines.
- During the Huk Rebellion in the early 1950s, the CIA spread rumours that evil men would be attacked by an aswang. They then punctured holes in the corpse of a Huk and drained all the blood from his body before leaving the body to be discovered on a road. Colonel Edward Lansdale was likely among those who encouraged and spread word of the practice as part of psy-ops against the Huks.

== Portrayals in media ==
=== In film ===
The aswang was depicted in the 1933 horror film Ang Aswang, regarded as the first sound film produced in the Philippines with William Smith as the sound engineer; it is now possibly lost. Two years later, the 1935 thriller film Sumpa ng Aswang (lit. 'Curse of the aswang'), directed by Agapito Conchu and starring Tembong, Rosa del Rosario and Patring Carvajal, was produced by Filippine Films.

In later years, the aswang has been depicted in several Philippine films:

- Anak ng Asuwang (lit. 'Child of the aswang', 1973), a horror film directed by Romy Suzara and starring Vilma Santos
- Ang Darling Ko'y Asuwang (lit. 'My darling is an aswang', 1975), a comedy film directed by F.H. Constantino and starring Chiquito and Nida Blanca
- Kumander Bawang: Kalaban ng Mga Aswang (transl. Commander garlic: enemy of the aswang, 1988), a superhero comedy film starring Herbert Bautista
- Aswang (1992), a horror film directed by Peque Gallaga and Lore Reyes; starring Alma Moreno
- Goosebuster (1992), a parody film directed by Tony Y. Reyes and starring comedian Joey de Leon
- Sa Piling ng Aswang (transl. In the aswang's embrace, 1999), a horror film directed by Peque Gallaga and Lore Reyes; starring Maricel Soriano
- Spirit Warriors: The Shortcut (2003), a horror adventure film directed by Chito S. Roño and starring Vhong Navarro and Jhong Hilario
- Fly Aswang (2005), an animated short film directed by Mark Galvez and produced by Imee Marcos
- Ang Darling Kong Aswang (lit. 'My aswang darling', 2009), a comedy film directed by Tony Y. Reyes and starring Vic Sotto and Cristine Reyes
- Aswang (2011), an action horror film directed by Jerrold Tarog and starring Lovi Poe
- Corazon: Ang Unang Aswang (lit. 'The first aswang', 2012), a period horror film written and directed by Richard V. Somes and starring Erich Gonzales
- The Strangers (2012), a horror film directed by Lawrence Fajardo
- Maria Labo (2015), a horror film directed by Roi Vinzon
- Santigwar (2019), an action horror film directed by Joven Tan and starring Alexa Ilacad
- Blood Hunters: Rise of the Hybrids (2019), a martial arts fantasy film starring Monsour del Rosario
- They are also featured in the Shake, Rattle & Roll series of horror anthology films: Shake, Rattle & Roll (1984), II (1990), IV (1992), 2k5 (2005), 8 (2006), X (2008), 12 (2010), Fourteen: The Invasion (2012), and Evil Origins (2025).
- Erik Matti's The Aswang Chronicles films: Tiktik (2012) and Kubot (2014)

The aswang are also featured in the following Western films:

- Aswang (1994) is an American horror film written and directed by Wrye Martin and Barry Poltermann. Depicting the mythical creature as one that feeds on the unborn, it presents the aswang as a form of vampire.
- Surviving Evil (2009) is a British horror film directed and written by Terence Daw. It follows documentary filmmakers who travel to a Philippine island, only to discover that a colony of shape-shifting, cannibalistic aswang inhabit the island.
- An Aswang Halloween (2023) is an American found footage horror film that follows a group of campers trying to survive being pursued by an aswang on Halloween night.
- Forgotten Island (2026) is an American animated feature film by DreamWorks Animation, where two Filipina friends find a portal to Nakali, an island populated with many different aswang.

=== In television ===
- "Aswang", a 2006 episode of the Philippine superhero television series Da Adventures of Pedro Penduko
- My Darling Aswang, a 2010 Philippine sitcom that served as a spinoff to the 2009 film Ang Darling Kong Aswang
- In the 2013 fantasy action television series Juan dela Cruz and its prequel My Little Juan, the titular character portrayed by Coco Martin is half-aswang
- "Mommy Dearest", a 2014 episode of the American supernatural drama television series Grimm, features an aswang attacking Sergeant Wu's pregnant childhood friend from the Philippines. It features an aswang as a form of wesen that sucks the amniotic fluid out of a pregnant woman's stomach.
- The aswang are the main villains of the 2021 animated series Trese, acting as a gang of sorts opposing Alexandra Trese.
- The anime Blade features the manananggal (self-segmenting) and mandurugo (harpy-like, two flying variants of aswangs.

=== In literature ===
- An aswang character appears in the fourth issue of the comedy-horror webcomic Fantastic Crap Comics.
- Tikbalang, Aswang, Atbp. B1 Gang Series is a fictional series that follows four children on their supernatural investigations.
- Juan and the Asuangs: A Tale of Philippine Ghosts and Spirits is a children's picture book by José Aruego about a young boy who encounters many Asuangs in the forest while on a journey to confront the manananggal that has been attacking his village's dogs and chickens.
- The Aswang Inquiry compiles the supernatural research of Frank Lynch, S.J., and Richard Arend, S.V.D.
- An aswang is the primary antagonist in the Supernatural spin-off novel Supernatural: Fresh Meat.
- "The Aswang Complex in Philippine Folklore" is an academic paper turned book written by Dr. Maximo Rosales. It is a compilation of the various aswang qualities in different regions of the Philippines.
- Aswang (Monsters) and Supernaturalisms: Nocturnal Deities talks of aswang myths, beliefs, and folktales through the lens of the Atimonan townsfolk.
- Aswang are the main subjects in Filipino-American author Jason Tanamor's novel Vampires of Portlandia.
- An aswang is described terrorising a remote village in the Philippines in Denis Johnson's National Book Award-winning novel Tree of Smoke.
- A demonic character called "Aswang" is a member of the Diwatas, the Filipino gods of the Marvel Comics universe.
- A murdered young woman with a lineage of unfulfilled ancestors is transformed by death into an aswang who seeks justice in Melissa Chadburn's debut novel, A Tiny Upward Shove.
- The aswang are the primary antagonists in the 2018 horror novel 100 Fathoms Below.
- The central character in Andrew Jalbuena Pasaporte's middle-grade novel, Gimo Jr. and the Aswang Clan, is the son of the most famous aswang chieftain.
- The main character in the New York times best seller book "Masters of Death" Viola Marek is an aswang.

=== Other ===
- LUNA: An Aswang Romance is a Filipino play about the creature.
- Ang Unang Aswang is a stage play that dramatizes the concept of how the first aswang came to be.
- Professional wrestler T. J. Perkins adopted the Aswang as part of his persona at Wrestle Kingdom 18. As the Aswang, he wears a monstrous mask, a ragged skirt, and red contact lenses. More recently, he has used the Aswang persona in the Best of Super Juniors 31 tournament.
- The independent ghost investigation video game Phasmophobia added the Aswang to their findable ghost types during the Alan Wake Event on 12 May 2026.
