= Nightfall: Escape =

2016 video game

- Developers: Zeenoh, 7 Seals
- Publisher: Zeenoh
- Directors: Jhondie T. Abenaza; Geoffrey Daigon
- Producer: Jhondie T. Abenaza
- Engine: Unity
- Platforms: Microsoft Windows macOS X Linux
- Release: June 26, 2016
- Genre: Survival horror
- Mode: Single-player

Nightfall: Escape is a survival horror game developed and published by Filipino company Zeenoh Inc. The game was created for Microsoft Windows, macOS X and Linux, and was released as a full game on June 26, 2016, for the Steam platform. The player controls Ara Cruz, a field journalist who is assigned to investigate an old mansion that lead to a series of mysterious disappearances. Nightfall: Escape received mixed positive and negative reviews from critics, but it was praised for its narrative story and the uniqueness of the monsters used. Nightfall: Escape was awarded as the Most Outstanding Narrative Story by the Department of Information and Communications Technology in collaboration with the Game Developers Association of the Philippines, and the Animation Council of the Philippines held an awards night ceremony for games and animation on November 27, 2015, at SM Mall of Asia Cinema 5.

The development of Nightfall: Escape began in October 2014 as a mobile game but later upgraded into a PC game for the Steam platform soon after the announcement campaign in Kickstarter and Square Enix collective. Although after a few months, the team decided to back out of Kickstarter and open the game in early access in the Steam platform. The game has gotten "greenlit" by the Steam Greenlight service, available for download on the Steam platform ever since the Pre-Alpha PC Version on May 11, 2015, while the beta version was released on May 30, 2016.

== Gameplay ==
Nightfall: Escape is a survival horror game set in a haunted mansion homed by Philippine mythical creatures. Its presentation is similar to Silent Hill, where the protagonist gets trapped in an alternate dimension with no escape.

The player's character, Ara, is initially equipped with a flashlight, but eventually obtains a shard that would let her use a "bloodlight" to see hints and items being hidden in plain sight. This feature is very useful though there are setbacks as the characters visibility to some monsters become eminent. This feature also drains the life of the character, although her life is able to regenerate. The player is able to collect tools and weapons to use in some scenarios. The player must unlock the mystery of the haunted mansion as light shards collected in the game shows the historical events that circulates around it. Other items are hidden for the player collect to help solve various puzzles in the mansion.

The game also comes with a pause screen menu where they can view 3 different divisions which are the Inventory, Bestiary and Gallery. The inventory of the game features a grid system, which is automatically opened when the player interacts with unlockables, and puzzles. The Bestiary together with the Gallery however is featured in a Panel System. The Bestiary section is where they can see the stories or origin of the monsters they encounter throughout the game and, lastly, the Gallery is where the player is able to see the monsters' 3D models that are equivalent to collectibles or trophies.

== Plot ==
Nightfall: Escape puts the player in the perspective of Ara Cruz, a field journalist who was given a chance to investigate the mysterious disappearances in a remote area which started to rise. She soon realises that the disappearances has something more than what they seemed. With no help from her reliable assistant Jolo, she must uncover the mystery that surrounds the abandoned mansion infested with creatures where she thought only existed in lores. Either she will uncover the story of the missing people or become another number in the count.

=== Story ===
In 1899, during Spanish rule in the Philippines, there lived a wealthy mestizo family, the Dela Vega. They had a daughter named Maria, who was enthusiastic and kind to everyone. She befriends the son of a family's maid named Simon, who is the errand boy. They eventually became lovers. At the outbreak of the Philippine–American War, Simon decided to enlist in the army to defend the country. Due to circumstances, he became a prisoner of war.

With the Spanish and American occupation ceased, he returns home and sought out Maria dela Vega. At a gathering in the mansion, he sneaks in and pretends to be a guest. He soon unravels her family's legacy and her engagement to another rich man. The news enrages him and he has a heated confrontation with Maria. Enraged, Simon rapes and kills Maria, and kills her fiancé. Filled with guilt, the man takes his own life by hanging himself on a balete tree.

In 2008, a journalist named Ara Cruz was in need of finding news worthy of saving the newspaper company that she works for. She receives information of people disappearing in an abandoned mansion in a secluded area in the Northern Philippines. Ara, together with her assistant Jon "Jolo" Luigi, drive to the abandoned mansion at night to uncover the story themselves. Much to Ara's need of assistance, Jolo falls asleep during their travel, leaving her to enter the haunted property alone, fighting hordes of zombies along the way. In the end, she defeats Simon's evil form and helps the souls of Maria and Simon reunite, where they depart to the afterlife. Ara quickly escapes the now-burning mansion and is then attacked by a Manananggal. After the end credits, Ara is seen returning to her office where she picks up Maria's mirror that she got from the mansion. Her reflection suddenly changes into a demonic look. It is unknown if this is an illusion or if she is possessed by the Manananggal.
