= Juan dela Cruz (disambiguation) =

Juan dela Cruz is the national personification of the Philippines, often used to represent the "Filipino everyman".

Juan dela Cruz may also refer to:

- Nurse John (born 1995/96), Filipino Canadian comedian who is also known as John Dela Cruz.
- John of the Cross (1542–1591), Spanish Roman Catholic priest and mystic
- Juan de la Cruz (actor) (1881–1953), Spanish-born Danish actor and singer
- Juan de la Cruz (basketball) (born 1954), Argentine-born Spanish basketball player
- Juan dela Cruz (TV series), a 2013 Filipino television series
- Juan de la Cruz Band, a Filipino rock band
- Juan de la Cruz, a 1984 Filipino animated short film by the Alcazaren brothers
