= Siyokoy =

Philippine mythical creature

Creature information
- Similar entities: Kataw, Merman

Origin
- Region: Philippines

In Philippine mythology, a siyokoy (also shokoy, syokoy or siokoy) is an aquatic humanoid creature often described as having scales, webbed limbs, and fins. Most legends characterise siyokoy as hostile to humans, and they are said to drown individuals.

== Etymology ==
The term siyokoy came from the Hokkien shui gui. In Chinese folklore, shui gui are the restless spirits of drowned people, who drag unsuspecting victims underwater and drown them in order to possess their bodies. Siukuy (Siyokoy = from Chinese Mandarin "shuǐguǐ" which means "water ghost") the anito of the rivers [Era el dios de los ríos de los tágalos antiguos]. In modern Tagalog folklore, siyokoy are sea monsters, an anthropoid whose body is covered in glistening brown or green fish scales and webbet feet; some description also give them long, green tentacles and gill slits; they drown fishermen and consume them for food.

== Defining characteristics ==
Compared to sirena and kataw that have more human features, siyokoys are animalistic in form and structure.

The Syokoy is a creature from Filipino mythology, often depicted as a fearsome type of merman with distinct, terrifying features. Unlike traditional mermaids with fish tails, the Syokoy has human-like legs, allowing it to move both in water and on land. Its body is typically described as muscular and green, covered in slimy scales that reflect its aquatic nature. The Syokoy’s face is grotesque, with sharp, pointed teeth and bulging eyes that give it a predatory appearance. Its webbed hands and feet are ideal for swimming, and it may have gills on its neck for breathing underwater. Often described as lurking in the depths of the ocean or lakes, the Syokoy is feared for its strength and malevolent nature, symbolizing the dangers hidden in deep waters.
