= Sirena (Philippine mythology) =

Mythological sea creature

The Sirena is a mythological sea creature from Filipino culture. Popular in folklore in many regions of the Philippines. In Philippine mythology, the Sirena is a mythological aquatic legendary creature with the head and torso of a human female from waist down and the tail of a fish. The Sirena is an Engkanto –' the Filipino counterpart of English mermaids. Engkantos are classified as one of the Bantay Tubig, (guardian of a body of water) a Filipino term for mythical guardians of the water. In addition to the Sirena, other examples of Bantay Tubig are Siyokoy, Kataw, and Ugkoy. The male version of a Sirena is called a Sireno. Sometimes, Sirena are paired with Siyokoy. A popular mermaid character in the Philippines is Dyesebel.

== Behavior ==
The Sirena has a beautiful and enchanting voice that can attract and hypnotize males, especially fishermen. Sirena sing to sailors and enchant them, distracting them from their work and causing them to walk off ship decks or cause shipwrecks. They sing with enchanting voices while hiding among the rocks by the shore. When the men hear these songs, they are hypnotized and abducted by the Sirena. Some folk traditions claim that the Sirena carry their victims under the sea, sacrificing them to water deities. Other stories claim that the Sirena pretend to need rescuing from drowning, luring men into the sea, but then to squeeze the life out of any man who falls prey to their hoax.

A malevolent Sirena may tease and attract human males with its spellbinding songs. Occasional reports had Sirena grabbing seemingly hypnotized humans and drowning them or taking them underwater. Another view had the tempted human chasing the Sirena into deep water until he drowned or that he had a heart attack upon seeing such an Engkanto and toppled into the water to his death.

Dugongs, sea turtles, and small cetaceans like dolphins usually accompany the Sirena.

== Appearance ==
Sirena are beautiful sea creatures with the upper body of a human with long, flowing hair that is often curly or wavy and the lower body of a fish or a tail of a fish. In pre-Hispanic Philippines, Sirena were regarded as beautiful aquatic creatures.

== Folklore ==
Many Pangasinan myths describe Sirena who drown fishermen and warriors who worship Apo laki. In some stories, they are guardians of the waters of "asin-palan," shielding it from the tattooed raiders from the Visayas.

In Pre-colonial Philippines, it was believed that in the full moon or in the Dayaw or Kadayawan, one of the embodiments of the moon who is Bulan descended from the heavens to swim with the mermaids and that the mermaids protected the boy moon from sea monsters.

== Popular culture ==
- Marina was a fantasy series that featured a mermaid. It aired from February 23, 2004, to November 12, 2004, featuring Claudine Barretto.
- The first TV series adaptation of Dyesebel was broadcast on GMA Network in 2008. It originally aired on April 28, 2008, and ended on October 17, 2008, completing 125 episodes. It starred Marian Rivera and Dingdong Dantes in the lead roles. Cindy Kurlteto was originally cast as Dyesebel.
- A second Dyesebel adaptation was broadcast on ABS-CBN, played by Anne Curtis.

== Poetry ==
- La Sirena, a poem by Giovanni Pascoli, was published originally in Italian in the 1960s and features men being called to the waves through song.
- Triumph of Winter, a song by Gil Vicente, was performed in Spanish in 1529 to express the ignorance of boat captains.
- Arcadia, a twelve-chapter poem by Jacopo Sannazaro, tells of a world of music and adventure.
- Odyssey, a poem by Homer, was published in 1614 describes her as a bird-like creature who's songs lured sailors out into sea to their doom on rocky shores
