= Posthouse (film) =

2025 horror film directed by Nikolas Red

- Theatrical release poster
- Directed by: Nikolas Red
- Written by: Nikolas Red; Jericho Aguado; Kenneth Dagatan
- Produced by: Vincent Del Rosario III; Valerie S. Del Rosario; Veronique Del Rosario-Corpus; Iana Bernardez
- Starring: Sid Lucero; Bea Binene
- Cinematography: Steven Evangelio
- Edited by: Nikolas Red
- Music by: Jem Talaroc
- Production companies: Evolve Studios; Studio Viva
- Distributed by: Viva Films
- Release date: August 20, 2025
- Running time: 94 minutes
- Country: Philippines
- Language: Filipino

Posthouse is a Philippine psychological horror film directed by Nikolas Red in his film directorial debut co-written by Red, Jericho Aguado and Kenneth Dagatan. Sid Lucero and Bea Binene are the leading stars of the film. The film's inspiration is the Philippine mythical creature Manananggal and the silent film about it.

== Synopsis ==
A father and his daughter work together on an unfinished silent film, unintentionally unleashing a monster in the process.

== Cast ==
- Sid Lucero as Cyril
- Bea Binene as Rea
- Carlos Siguion-Reyna as Ruel
- Rafa Siguion-Reyna as Jeffrey
- Ryza Cenon as Ange
- Andrea Del Rosario

== Production ==
Nikolas Red previously worked as an editor and writer, notably on Deleter (2022), Eerie (2018), Dead Kids (2019), and the short Putol (2021). Mikhail Red, Nikolas’s brother and an acclaimed director in his own right the executive producer of the film.

The project earned two awards, Discover of Asia Award and VIPO Award at the Network of Asian Fantastic Films (NAFF) 2022 during the Bucheon International Fantastic Film Festival (BIFAN), helping secure USD 15,000 in funding.

The film is partially based on the legend of Ang Manananggal, a supposedly lost 1927 silent horror film, and framed within the folklore of the manananggal. Nikolas drew inspiration from lost Filipino silent cinema and his own experiences working with horror restoration and editing.

== Themes ==
The film contains themes of generational trauma and the blurred boundary between media and reality.

== Release ==
The film premiered in the Philippines on August 20, 2025, under Viva Films.

== Reception ==
Spin reviewed the film, writing that it "creates a haunting atmosphere, which was evident during the sequences involving the silent film."
