= Kataw (Philippine mythology) =

Philippine mythical creature

Creature information
- Grouping: Merfolk

Origin
- Region: Philippines

The kataw is one of the merfolk in the Philippine Mythology. In Visayan, katau was believed to have higher rankings than other water and sea creatures as those of Sirena, Sireno and Siyokoy. It is believed that the Kataws are the reigning rulers of the kingdom of the Bantay Tubig or merfolk.

Based on physical features, kataws, along the Sireyna and Sireyno, were the Bantay Tubig-creatures that bear likeness to human while Siyokoy are those that resemble water-creatures. Unlike Sirena, they have feet instead of tails but they have gills on their bodies and fins in their arms. These marine creatures disguise themselves as fishermen asking for help. When approached by mortals, the Kataws drown them into the abyss.

According to old folks, Kataws have the ability to manipulate and control water-type elements and related forces such as pressure, tides, waves, bubbles and the likes. Also, they can change water to ice.

== In folklore ==
Belief in the kataw, a merfolk figure in Philippine mythology, has been common since the early colonial period. In his 1668 manuscript Historia de las Islas e Indios de Bisayas, Jesuit priest Francisco Ignacio Alzina included illustrations of both male and female kataw, highlighting how deeply rooted the belief was in Visayan culture. Kataw are commonly portrayed as creatures with a human-like upper body and a fish-like lower half, often appearing as beautiful maidens with long, dark hair and black eyes. They are believed to inhabit underwater dwellings, where they live beneath the surface of the sea, and are generally regarded as beings whose presence may bring either good fortune, prosperity, and favorable outcomes or misfortune and unfavorable circumstances.
