= Romeo Candido =

Filipino Canadian film and television director

Romeo Candido is a Filipino Canadian film and television director. He is most noted as creator of the web series Topline, for which he received two Canadian Screen Award nominations at the 11th Canadian Screen Awards in 2023 for Best Direction in a Web Program or Series and Best Writing in a Web Program or Series.

Originally from Flower's Cove, Newfoundland and Labrador, he is a graduate of the Canadian Film Centre.

== Career ==
He first became known for his 2002 short film Lolo's Child. In 2006, he released the feature film Ang Pamana: The Inheritance.

In 2011 he directed Prison Dancer, a musical web series starring the CPDRC Dancing Inmates, which was a nominee for Best Original Program or Series, Fiction at the 1st Canadian Screen Awards in 2013.

In the mid-2010s he was a producer with CBC Arts, including on the series Exhibitionists and Canada's a Drag.

In 2021 he directed "Shorty", a short film released as part of the NBA Films for Fans project.

He has also directed episodes of the television series Second Jen, Workin' Moms and The Next Step, and has written for The Next Step, Amateur Life and Son of a Critch. In addition to Topline, he was a Canadian Screen Award nominee for Best Direction in a Children's or Youth Program in 2023 for "One Song Glory", an episode of The Next Step.
