= X-linked dystonia parkinsonism =

- Other names: Lubag syndrome
- This condition is inherited in an X-linked recessive manner
- Specialty: Neurology

X-linked dystonia parkinsonism (XDP), also known as lubag syndrome or X-linked dystonia of Panay, is a rare X-linked progressive movement disorder with high penetrance found almost exclusively in males from Panay. It is characterized by dystonic movements first typically occurring in the 3rd and 4th decade of life. The dystonic movements often either coexist or develop into parkinsonism within 10 years of disease onset.

== Symptoms and signs ==
Symptoms typically present in the 3rd or 4th decade of life, but have been seen as early as the age of 14. It presents with torsion dystonia, particularly when presenting at a younger age, which then progresses to parkinsonism with or without ongoing dystonia. Often the two symptoms coexist. The parkinsonian features of X-linked dystonia parkinsonism include festinating gait, bradykinesia, blepharospasm, and postural instability. It often lacks a resting tremor, helping to differentiate it from Parkinson's disease.

== Genetics ==
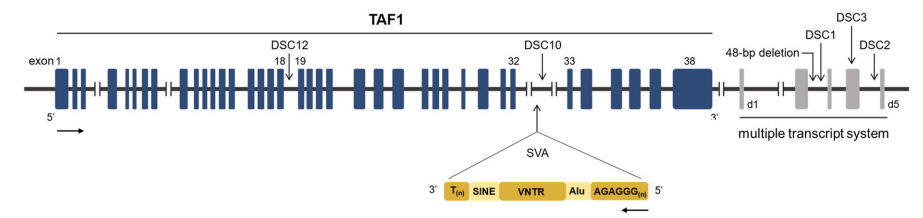
XDP haplotype of the TAF1 gene with SVA insertion and DSCs (PMID:33835428)

XDP has an X-linked, recessive pattern of inheritance. Genetic analysis suggests that the responsible mutation was introduced into the ethnic groups of Panay (especially to the Hiligaynon people) over two millennia ago explained by the genetic founder effect — possibly due to island's limited genetic variability. XDP is a result from a mutation of the TAF1 gene encoded from Chromosome Xq13.1 locus, which is also identified as DYT3. The genetic mutation stems from a retrotransposon insertion polymorphism at the SINE-VNTR-Alu (SVA) of the TAF1 gene at intron 32, which leads to a downregulation of TAF1 mRNA levels due to the failure to remove the intron during RNA splicing. Furthermore, the length of the hexanucleotide repeat region (CCCTCT)_{n} of the SVA region has been shown to be negatively correlated to the age of expression (i.e. Longer repeats are associated with earlier disease onset, whereas shorter repeats are associated with later onset.) Currently, there are various theories that contribute to the neuropathogenesis of XDP. One theory suggests that the SVA insertion affects the transcription of neuron-specific TAF1 genes that contains additional +6bps in exon 34, that differentiates itself from other TAF1 cell types. However, a recent study suggests that the mRNA levels of the neuron-specific gene were not affected by the SVA insertion. Instead, it has been theorized that disease-specific single nucleotide polymorphisms (DSCs) at DSC12, DSC2, and DSC3 and histone acetylation in the TAF1 gene suggest an epigenetic mechanism through DNA methylation that drive the activity of XDP expression. Notably, all these disease-specific genetic changes were observed in those from with Filipino descent but not in other ethnically diverse backgrounds.

== Pathophysiology ==
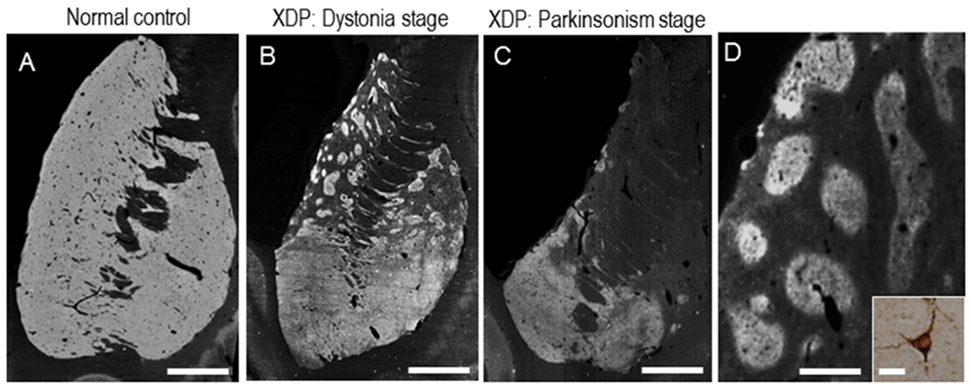
Progressive degradation of medium spiny neurons in the Caudate Nucleus and the Putamen posted from https://doi.org/10.3390/brainsci7070072

XDP is characterized mainly with the progressive degeneration of medium spiny neurons (MSNs) located in striatum, mainly in the caudate nucleus, putamen, and the globus pallidus. The specific loss of medium spiny neurons lead to the disruption of the GABAergic projections in the striatum — disinhibiting the nigrostriatal pathway for motor movement. This striatal dysfunction presents a subsequent manifestation of hyperkinetic dystonic movement. Due to the overcompensation of dopaminergic receptors and progressive neuronal loss, severe dysfunction of dopaminergic action presents as decreased motor output or Parkinson-like symptoms.

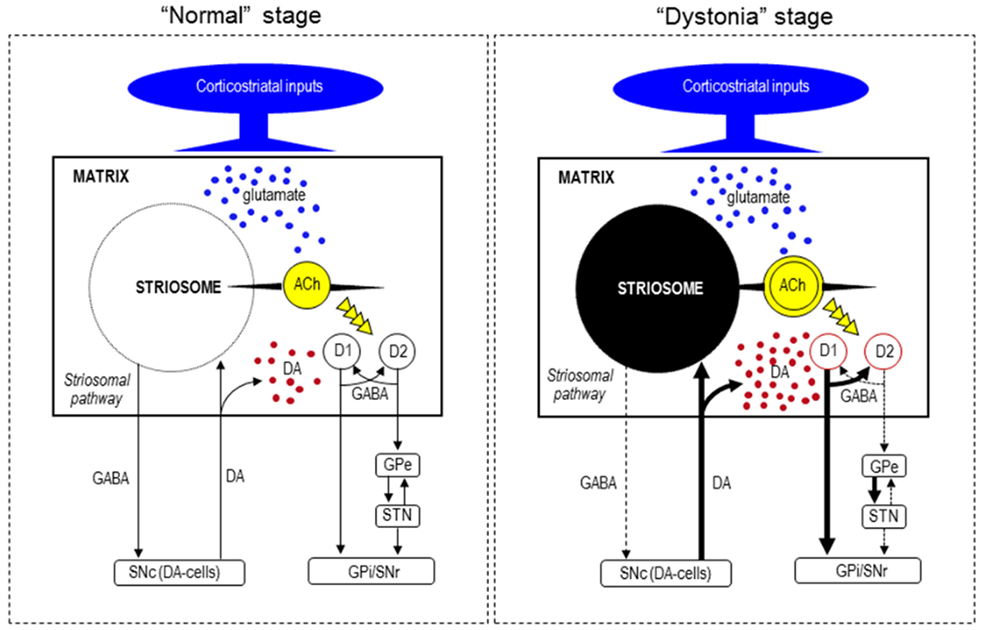
Schematic describing the hypothesized pathway for dystonic movement in XDP from https://doi.org/10.3390/brainsci7070072

== Diagnosis ==
XDP is suspected when a male patient has clinical presentations of dystonia (in varying severity: focal dystonia or multifocal dystonia) or parkinsonism, genetic testing for the gene changes (DSCs or SVA insertion) in TAF1/DYT3, and familial ancestral mapping to identify possible inheritance patterns. Neuroimaging techniques such as CT scans and MRI for signs of striatal brain atrophy are prodromal markers for XDP. Patients with XDP may exhibit olfactory dysfunction similar to Parkinson's disease, which can be measured through olfactory physiological tests (i.e. University of Pennsylvania Smell Identification Test, ccUPSIT). Polygenic Risk Scores for age of onset for XDP have yet to be established. However, if carrier females have been previously identified, it is possible to determine risk factors using prenatal testing and preimplantation genetic testing during or before pregnancy, respectively.

Clinical presentation of dystonia symptoms:

- Blepharospasm
- Limb Dystonia
- Tongue Dystonia
- Larygeal Dystonia

== Treatment ==
There is no cure for XDP and medical treatment offers only temporary relief. Some authors have reported benzodiazepines and anticholinergic agents in the early stages of the disease. Botulinum toxin injections have been used to relieve focal dystonia. Deep brain stimulation has shown promise in the few cases treated surgically.

== Epidemiology ==
Although all early reported cases occurred in the Philippines, X-linked dystonia parkinsonism has been diagnosed in Japan, US, Canada, and Germany in people of Filipino descent. The prevalence in the Philippines has been estimated at 1/322,000 and as high as 1/4,000 in the province of Capiz's male population. As an X-linked recessive disease, the majority of those affected are males with females generally being asymptomatic carriers. In the largest described series, the mean age of onset was 39.7 years, the mean duration of illness was 16 years, and the mean age of death was 55.6 years.

== History ==
The high concentration of XDP in the Philippines was first documented in the 1970s after the Philippine General Hospital received five neurology referrals labelled as "dystonia musculorum deformans". This sparked an epidemiological survey which was published in 1976. Lee et al. described a series of 28 men, 23 of whom were from Panay Island. She found six families that each had more than one male member affected with XDP and found that there was no male to male transmission. There was also a family history of parkinsonism in some of the patients. The name lubag is based on the term used by Ilonggo speaking Filipinos. It describes any movements with torsion.

The occurrence of the condition in Panay, particularly in the province of Capiz, has led to associations of the disease with the mythical creature called the aswang, due to the symptoms of the disease being similar with the supposed behavior of such beings.
