= Nurse John =

Filipino-Canadian comedian

- Born: John Dela Cruz; 1995 (age 30–31); Bulacan, Philippines
- Other name: Nurse John

Comedy career
- Medium: Online, stand-up
- Subject: Healthcare worker's experiences

Instagram information
- Page: John Dela Cruz
- Genre: Comedy
- Followers: 5 million

TikTok information
- Page: nurse.johnn
- Genre: Comedy
- Followers: 8.9 million
- Last updated: June 27, 2026

John Dela Cruz, known professionally as Nurse John is a Filipino-Canadian comedian and social media content creator.

== Early life ==
John Dela Cruz was born in 1995 or 1996 and raised in Bulacan but later migrated to Canada at the age of 17.

== Career ==
John Dela Cruz who would become eventually known as Nurse John started his career in content creation while he was working as a nurse at a hospital in South Shore, Montreal during the COVID-19 pandemic. He quit nursing two years into the pandemic due to burnout.

Nurse John still working as a real nurse posted videos in TikTok as a means to take a break from his hectic schedule and entertain audiences on content relating to his work. He films himself simulating nurse-patient situations as well as featuring himself dancing and singing to patients to make them take their medication. He also established presence in Instagram.

He later committed to a career as stand-up comedy when he moved to Los Angeles in the United States in 2024.

Nurse John's comedy tour Short-Staffed was derived from his experience feeling burnt out as a frontline healthcare worker during the pandemic. The tour had stops in various locations including Canada, Europe, Australia, the Philippines and New Zealand. He also appeared in other shows such as Netflix Is a Joke and Just for Laughs.

While his content is mostly focused on healthcare workers, Nurse John has broadened his subject to include experiences of other customer service workers.

Forbes has included Nurse John in its Top Creators of 2026 list. It placed John as the top 28 creator with an estimated earnings of $7.2 million (₱441 million).
