= Manananggal =

Vampiric creature from Philippine folklore

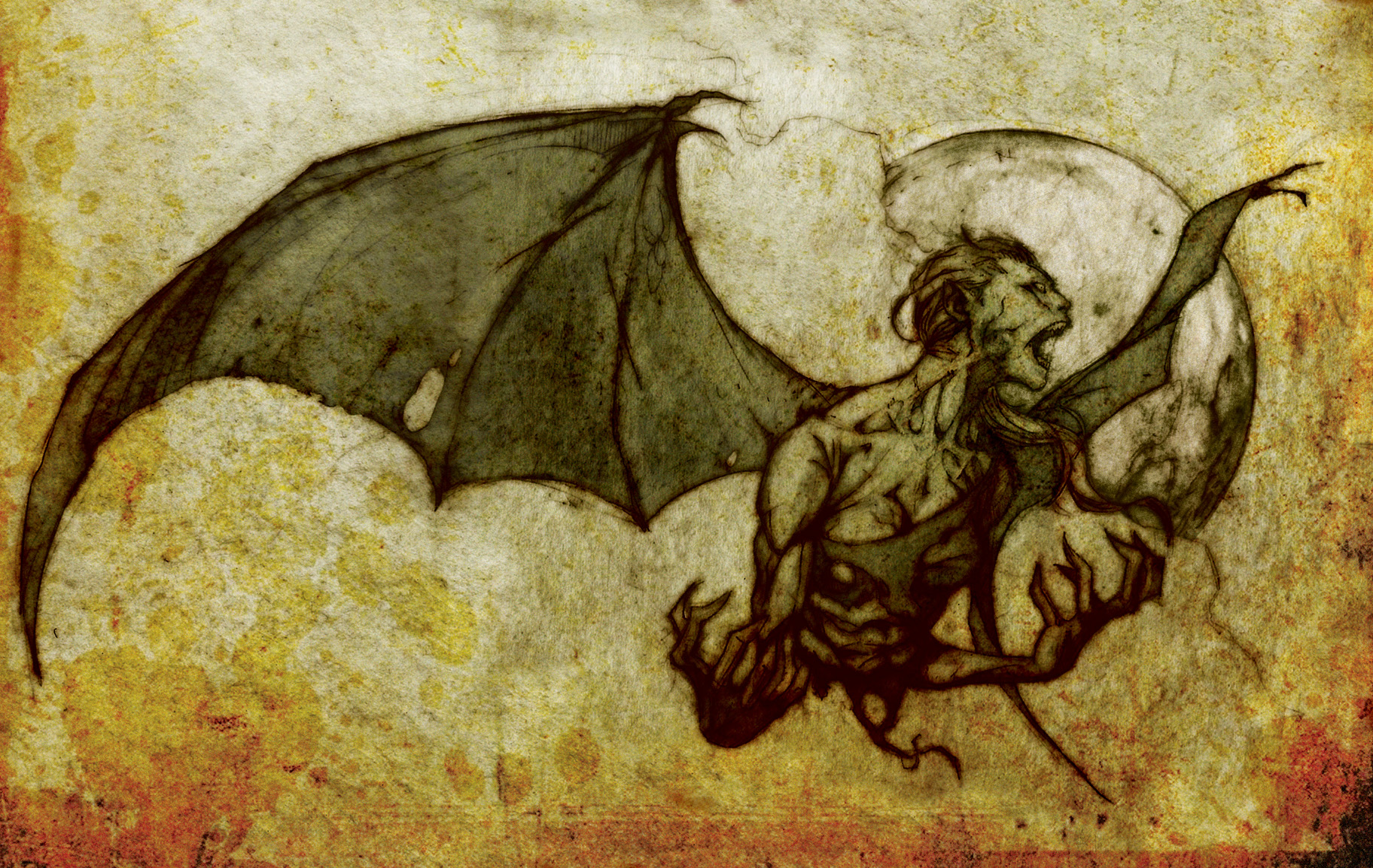

Creature information
- Similar entities: Vampire

Origin
- Country: Philippines
- Region: Visayas

The manananggal (lit. 'remover') is a mythical creature from the folklore of the Philippines. The creature is said to have the ability to detach and separate its upper torso from the lower part of its body. Its fangs and wings give it a vampire-like appearance.

== Mythology ==
The word manananggál is derived from the Tagalog word tanggál, meaning "to remove" or "to separate", and literally translating to "remover" or "separator". In this case, it may be interpreted as "one who separates itself". The name is also associated with an expression referring to a severed torso.

In Philippine folklore, the manananggal is typically portrayed as a fearsome and grotesque creature, most often depicted as female. It is known to separate its upper body from its lower half, revealing its entrails and developing large, bat-like wings that allow it to fly at night in search of victims.

The manananggal is commonly believed to prey on sleeping, pregnant women by using an elongated, proboscis-like tongue to extract fetuses or draw blood. It was hypothesized to explained sudden miscarriages in ancient Philippines. Folklore also associates the creature with targeting newlyweds, lovers, newborn children, and occasionally grooms who were abandoned after marriage. During its nocturnal hunt, the creature's severed lower torso remains motionless and is its point of vulnerability. Traditional practices for killing a manananggal include applying salt, garlic, ash, or fire to the lower half, thereby preventing the upper torso from reuniting with it. If it fails to recombine before sunrise, the creature is believed to die.

The myth of the manananggal is widely recognized in the Visayan regions of the Philippines, particularly in the western provinces of Capiz, Iloilo, Bohol, and Antique. Descriptions of the manananggal vary across different accounts, but it is generally associated with characteristics similar to those found in other folkloric beings such as vampires, Visayan folklore entities, and aswangs, as manananggals are also believed to be repelled by garlic, salt, and holy water. They are also thought to avoid daggers, light, vinegar, spices and the tail of a stingray, which can be fashioned into a whip. Capiz, in particular, is frequently cited as a focal point for manananggal lore and other supernatural folklore involving beings such as ghosts, goblins, and ghouls, collectively referred to as aswangs. Despite the influence of modernization, belief in and reports of encounters with such creatures reportedly continue in certain areas. Comparable mythical figures appear in neighboring Southeast Asian cultures, including those of Indonesia and Malaysia. The manananggal also shares certain traits with European vampire folklore, particularly those from the Balkan region, such as aversion to garlic, salt, and sunlight.

== Historical accounts ==
"The seventh was called magtatangal, and his purpose was to show himself at night to many persons, without his head or entrails. In such wise the devil walked about and carried, or pretended to carry, his head to different places; and, in the morning, returned it to his body—remaining, as before, alive. This seems to me to be a fable, although the natives affirm that they have seen it, because the devil probably caused them so to believe. This occurred in Catanduanes."

— Fr. Juan de Plasencia, Customs of the Tagalogs (1589)

Brujo. Magtatangal. Dicen que vuela y come carne humana pero cuando levanta el vuelo no lleva mas que el medio cuerpo y por eso se llama asi porque es de "tangal" que es desencajar y el tal desencaja la mitad del cuerpo y ese lleva consigo dejadose en casa el otro medio. Magtatangal. A witch. They say that it flies and eats human flesh, but when it flies, it only has half its body, and that is why it is called that because it's tangal which means that it can disengage, and he dislodges half of his body and carries the other half home.

— Fray Domingo de los Santos, Vocabulario de Lengua Tagala (1703)

== Appearances in film and other media ==
- Manananggal (1927), directed by José Nepomuceno, was the first-ever Filipino horror film. It is a silent film starring Mary Walter portraying the manananggal in its current form, with the upper torso detaching. Little is known of the film's plot.
- Manananggal vs. Mangkukulam (1960), directed by Consuelo Osorio, is a Lea Productions horror comedy starring Pugo, Lopito, Patsy, Chichay and Aruray.
- Mga Bata ng Lagim (1964), again by Consuelo Osorio, features 1960s teen matinee idols "Sampaguita-VP All-Stars". It feature a prominent scene where German Moreno and Boy Alano turn into manananggal after applying oil to their bodies, and then perform the popular folk song Paru-parong Bukid.
- Juan and the Asuangs: A Tale of Philippine Ghosts and Spirits is a (1970) children's picture book by José Aruego about a young boy who encounters many Asuangs in the forest while on a journey to confront the manananggal that has been attacking his village's dogs and chickens.
- In Lipad, Darna, Lipad! (1973), directed by Maning Borlaza, Gloria Romero plays the respectable teacher Miss Luna, who is secretly a manananggal. It co-stars Vilma Santos.
- In Pagsapit ng Dilim (1975), Perla Bautista plays a mother who tricks her daughter Gina Pareño into becoming a manananggal as part of her coming-of-age rites.
- Shake, Rattle & Roll (1984) is the first of the horror film anthology. In one episode, directed by Peque Gallaga, Herbert Bautista plays a teenager in a faraway province. A manananggal is said to live within the vicinity and is out to eat people. He is given the task by his grandmother to kill this creature. Having found a way to prevent it from returning to its body, he must now survive the night to protect his family from the creature's attacks. It co-stars Irma Alegre and Mary Walter.
- In Impaktita (1989), Jean Garcia plays the role of a young girl whose mother is a manananggal. When she turns 18, she transforms into a wild, bloodsucking creature at night by the eerie sound of a bat and preys on any living person she can find. Other stars include Richard Gomez, Aga Muhlach, Gloria Romero, and Nida Blanca.
- In one episode of Shake, Rattle & Roll IV (1992), a homeless family and their neighbours in Manila are plagued by attacks from a manananggal. A little boy (IC Mendoza) suspects a nun (Aiko Melendez) to be the creature, but no one believes him. He finds himself racing to prove his suspicions before he becomes the monster's next victim.
- Takot Ka Ba Sa Dilim? (1996) features a brief scene where Marjorie Barretto plays a young woman who turns into a ravenous manananggal at night, hunting for unsuspecting victims. Other cast members include Angelu de Leon, Rica Peralejo, Bobby Andrews, Red Sternberg, and Amanda Page.
- In Manananggal in Manila (1997), an English-speaking manananggal (Alma Concepcion) spreads terror in Manila.
- Banzai Girl is a 2002 graphic novel series created, written, and drawn by Filipino artist and model Jinky Coronado. Its main character (also named Jinky Coronado) is a seemingly ordinary schoolgirl, but has a mysterious connection to two other realities. When her worlds begin to collide, she is forced to battle various monsters, including a vicious manananggal.
- Dayo: Sa Mundo ng Elementalia (2008) is an animated film directed by Robert Quilao whose plot revolves around Bubuy (Nash Aguas), out to save his abducted grandparents in the land of Elementalia. It features a friendly vegetarian manananggal named Anna (Katrina Legaspi), relating her to a different species of bat which is a fruit bat, as opposed the bloodthirsty ones of folklore. Pokwang co-stars.
- In Episode 5, "Island Lights" (The Island of Fire) of Marvel Anime: Blade (2011), Blade and his partners encounter a mutant manananggal and its victims while hunting down Deacon Frost in Siquijor, an island province in the nation's south.
- The Aswang Phenomenon (2011), directed by Jordan Clark, is a documentary on aswang folklore and its effects on Philippine society. The evolution and history of the manananggal is explored from anthropological, sexual and pop culture views. Produced by High Banks Entertainment Ltd., the cast includes Peque Gallaga, Rodolfo Vera, and Maricel Soriano.
- In the erotic novel Melania: Devourer of Men (2018), Melania Trump is depicted as a manananggal who must keep her identity hidden after her husband becomes President of the United States. The novel has been discussed in several podcasts and in 2026 it became the top Amazon search result for 'Melania Trump'
- In the TV series Aso ni San Roque (2012), directed by Don Michael Perez, Fatima (Mona Louise Rey) is a blind girl with a heart of gold, and is the offspring of a mortal and a manananggal. Her fate is to end the devastation of the aswang in the human world with the help of Anghel, the dog statue at the feet of Saint Roch, which miraculously comes to life. It features Kanlaon (Gardo Versoza), the manananggal leader of the airborne Aswang of the Wind. He once loved and failed to Lourdes (LJ Reyes), a manananggal herself, and the mother of Fatima.
- Fresh Meat (2013), a novel tie-in to the television series Supernatural by Alice Henderson, features the main characters battling an aswang in the Sierra Nevada during a blizzard. The creature in this novel sucks human organs out through its proboscis, inserts the body parts of other humans into the victim, then seals the hole. The main characters make the traditional stingray-tail whip amulet, covered with spices, and use it to kill the creature.
- In Midnight Blue-Light Special (2013), the second volume of the InCryptid series by Seanan McGuire, the protagonist Verity Price slays a manananggal in a hospital.
- The episode "Si Esperanza, Ang Rebeldeng Manananggal" ("Esperanza, The Rebel Manananggal") of the 2014 television series Elemento is about the manananggal Esperanza (Glaiza de Castro), a pediatrician with two mortal sons. Her desire is to protect them from adopting the life of being a manananggal. The episode is directed by Topel Lee and co-stars Valerie Concepcion and Maria Isabel Lopez.
- Nightfall: Escape (2016) by Zeenoh is the first-ever Filipino horror game, a first-person survival horror video game featuring a manananggal as the main antagonist.
- In "Mommy Dearest", the 14th episode of Season 3 of the supernatural drama television series Grimm and the 58th episode overall, which premiered on March 7, 2014, on the broadcast network NBC, features an aswang attacking Wu's pregnant childhood friend from the Philippines. It turns out Wu's friend married into a family of aswang, and the attacker is her mother-in-law, who claims she will die if she does not eat her first grandchild.
- Ang Manananggal sa Unit 23B, a horror-romance movie made in 2016 and had its cinema screening in 2017, focuses on the love life of a woman who is a manananggal by night. It features the actress Ryza Cenon as the protagonist and actor Martin del Rosario as her lover.
- Deadly Vows by Keri Arthur has a manananggal terrorising newlyweds in the Castle Rock Reservation.
- In the game Shin Megami Tensei V, Manananggal was revealed as a new demon and the first representative of Filipino folklore for the Shin Megami Tensei series.
- In the short story M by Sarah Hall, published in Sudden Traveller 2019, the protagonist turns into a creature that fits the description of the manananggal, though this is not overtly stated.
- In the multimedia franchise Monster High, a doll based on the manananggal named Corazón Marikit was released in March 2025. A custom manananggal doll of Katseye member Sophia Laforteza was created by Mattel after the group covered the franchise's theme song "Fright Song". In the Music Video of their Fright Song remake, she also wore a Red Dress, makeup and fangs to dress up as she embodied it.
- In the dark fantasy novel Segmentado (meaning “segmented”) by Spanish writer J. A. Díaz, one of the main characters is a manananggal.
- A coffee table book released by CANVAS titled Where are my legs? features a manananggal as its main protagonist.
- Posthouse, an upcoming horror film directed by Nikolas Red. The film is inspired by Manananggal and the 1927 film about it.
- In the short story Hearts and Half-Measures by Cassiopeia Gatmaitan, read for the podcast PseudoPod, the protagonist is a transgender woman who is also a manananggal.
- The Manananggal is featured in the animated feature film Forgotten Island (2026) by DreamWorks Animation, her name is Manang, with Lea Salonga providing the voice.

== Other terms and versions ==
- Aswang: However, aswang is a generic term and can refer to all types of monsters (usually ghouls, werebeasts, and vampires) and witches (mangkukulam), etc.
- Tik-tik: Manananggals are sometimes referred to as tik-tik, the sound it makes while flying. Folklore dictates that the fainter the sound, the nearer the manananggal is. This is to confuse the victim. Black cats and crows often signal a tik-tik's presence, and deformed faces or bodies in children are allegedly signs of the aftermath of a tik-tik attack.

== See also ==
- Chonchon – Mapuche creature that also detaches its head
- Krasue – Floating vampiric female head and entrails that is similar to a manananggal
- Nukekubi – Japanese creature that also detaches its head to feed on victims
- Penanggalan – A vampire akin to Manananggal from the Malay peninsula
- Leyak – Similar creature from Balinese mythology
- Philippine mythology
- Soucouyant – a Caribbean blood-sucking hag
- Tiyanak – Blood-sucking creature in a form of a baby that turns into what is known to be the child of the devil
