= 33rd Gawad Urian Awards =

2010 Philippine film awards ceremony

- Date: April 29, 2010
- Site: UP Diliman Film Center, Quezon City
- Hosted by: Gelli de Belen & Butch Francisco

Highlights
- Best Picture: Kinatay
- Most awards: Lola (4)
- Most nominations: Himpapawid & Kinatay (11)

The 33rd Gawad Urian Awards (Filipino: Ika-33 na Gawad Urian) is held on April 29, 2010. Established in 1976, the Gawad Urian Awards highlights the best of Philippine cinema as decided by the Filipino Film Critics. The best Philippine films for the year 2009 are honored in a ceremony at the UP Diliman Film Center in Quezon City. Brillante Mendoza pulls off a threepeat in this ceremony after winning the Best Director award for the third year in a row. Actress, producer and former head of the Movie and Television Review and Classification Board (MTRCB) Armida Siguion-Reyna wins the Natatanging Gawad Urian Award.

== Winners and nominees ==
Winners are listed first and bolded.

Best Picture Pinakamahusay na Pelikula	Best Director Pinakamahusay na Direksyon
**Kinatay**; Ang Panggagahasa kay Fe; Bakal Boys; Colorum; Engkwentro; Himpapawid; Hospital Boat; Last Supper No. 3; Lola; The Arrival	**Brillante Mendoza** **– Kinatay**; Alvin Yapan – Ang Panggagahasa kay Fe; Arnel Mardoquio – Hospital Boat; Brillante Mendoza – Lola; Erik Matti – The Arrival; GB Sampedro – Astig; John Steffan Ballesteros – Colorum; Pepe Diokno – Engkwentro; Ralston Jover – Bakal Boys; Raymond Red – Himpapawid; Veronica Velasco – Last Supper No. 3
Best Actor Pinakamahusay na Pangunahing Aktor	Best Actress Pinakamahusay na Pangunahing Aktres
**Lou Veloso – Colorum**; Alfred Vargas – Colorum; Allen Dizon – Dukot; Coco Martin – Kinatay; Dwight Gaston – The Arrival; Felix Roco – Engkwentro; Jacky Woo – Walang Hanggang Paalam; Joey Paras – Last Supper No. 3; John Lloyd Cruz – In My Life; Raul Arellano – Himpapawid	**Anita Linda – Lola**; **Rustica Carpio – Lola**; Che Ramos – Mangatyanan; Eugene Domingo – Kimmy Dora: Kambal sa Kiyeme; Irma Adlawan – Ang Panggagahasa kay Fe; Iza Calzado – Dukot; Janice de Belen – Last Viewing; Rosanna Roces – Wanted Border; Tessie Tomas – Sanglaan; Vilma Santos – In My Life
Best Supporting Actor Pinakamahusay na Pangalawang Aktor	Best Supporting Actress Pinakamahusay na Pangalawang Aktres
**Soliman Cruz – Himpapawid**; Ariel Ureta – Kimmy Dora: Kambal sa Kiyeme; Dennis Ascalon – The Arrival; Jake Roxas – Walang Hanggang Paalam; John Arcilla – Himpapawid; John Regala – Kinatay; Jose Ma. Javellana – Colorum; Milton Dionson – The Arrival	**Sue Prado – Himpapawid**; Dimples Romana – In My Life; Gina Alajar – Dukot; Gina Pareño – Bakal Boys; Glaiza de Castro – Astig; Jea Lyka Cinco – Hospital Boat; Maria Isabel Lopez – Kinatay; Miriam Quiambao – Kimmy Dora: Kambal sa Kiyeme
Best Screenplay Pinakamahusay na Dulang Pampelikula	Best Cinematography Pinakamahusay na Sinematograpiya
**Lola**; Anacbanua; Ang Panggagahasa kay Fe; Biyaheng Lupa; Engkwentro; Himpapawid; Kinatay; Last Supper No. 3; The Arrival	**Himpapawid**; Anacbanua; Ang Panggagahasa kay Fe; Bakal Boys; Engkwentro; Hospital Boat; Independencia; Kinatay; Lola
Best Production Design Pinakamahusay na Disenyong Pamproduksyon	Best Editing Pinakamahusay na Editing
**Lola**; Bakal Boys; Himpapawid; Hospital Boat; Independencia; Kinatay; Last Supper No. 3	**Engkwentro**; Biyaheng Lupa; Colorum; Himpapawid; Kinatay; Last Supper No. 3; Lola; The Arrival
Best Music Pinakamahusay na Musika	Best Sound Pinakamahusay na Tunog
**The Arrival**; Dinig Sana Kita; Hospital Boat; Independencia; Kinatay; Last Supper No. 3	**Kinatay**; Bakal Boys; Engkwentro; Himpapawid; Last Supper No. 3; Lola

== Special Award ==
=== Natatanging Gawad Urian ===
- Armida Siguion-Reyna

== Multiple nominations and awards ==
Films that received multiple nominations
Nominations	Films
11	Himpapawid
11	Kinatay
9	Lola
8	Last Supper No. 3
8	The Arrival
7	Engkwentro
6	Bakal Boys
6	Colorum
6	Hospital Boat
5	Ang Panggagahasa kay Fe
3	Dukot
3	In My Life
3	Independencia
3	Kimmy Dora: Kambal sa Kiyeme
2	Anacbanua
2	Astig
2	Biyaheng Lupa
2	Walang Hanggang Paalam

Films that won multiple awards
Awards	Film
4	Lola
3	Himpapawid
3	Kinatay
