= List of awards and honours received by Anita Linda =

Anita Linda awards and nominations
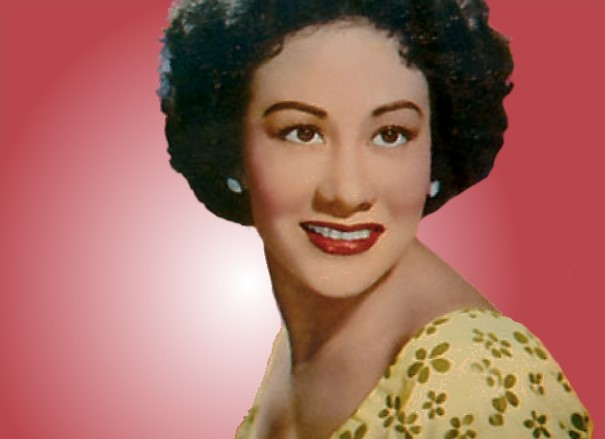
Awards and nominations
Award	Wins	Nominations
ASEAN International Film Festival	1	1
Ani ng Dangal	2	2
Asia-Pacific Film Festival	1	1
Cannes Film Festival	0	1
Cinemanila International Film Festival	1	1
Cinemalaya Philippine Independent Film Festival	1	1
Cultural Center of the Philippines	1	1
Eastwood City Walk of Fame	1	1
Fajr International Film Festival	1	1
FAMAS Awards	2	8
Film Development Council of the Philippines	1	1
Gawad PASADO Awards	1	1
Gawad Tanglaw Awards	2	2
Gawad Urian Awards	3	10
Golden Screen Awards	2	4
ICON Awards	1	1
International Film Festival of Kerala	1	1
Las Palmas de Gran Canaria International Film Festival	1	1
Luna Awards	1	3
Maria Clara Awards	1	1
Metro Manila Film Festival	1	1
Miami International Film Festival	1	1
National Commission for Culture and the Arts	1	1
PMPC Star Awards for Movies	1	3
PMPC Star Awards for Television	1	1
Young Critics Circle	1	4

Totals (Note: Certain award groups do not simply award one winner. They acknowledge several different recipients, have runners-up, and have third place. Since this is a specific recognition and is different from losing an award, runner-up mentions are considered wins in this award tally. For simplification and to avoid errors, each award in this list has been presumed to have had a prior nomination.)
- Wins: 31
- Nominations: 54

Anita Linda was a Filipino actress who has received accolades for her contributions to film and television which spanned nearly 80 years. She was one of the first woman to win the first official acting race in Philippine movies, Maria Clara Awards, where she was crowned Best Actress for her performance in the film Sisa (1951). At the age of 74, she became the oldest actress to win a FAMAS Award for her performance in the 1998 film Ang Babae sa Bubungang Lata.

Linda has also received numerous accolades from various international award giving bodies. In 1980, she was nominated for the coveted Palme d'Or, the highest prize at the Cannes Film Festival. She was hailed Best Actress in the Southeast Asian category at the 10th Cinemanila International Film Festival for her portrayal in the titular role Adela (2008). For her indie film Lola (2009), she bagged two Best Actress trophies at the 54th Asia Pacific Film Festival in Taiwan and Fajr International Film Festival in Iran. Her role in the drama film Sta. Niña (2012) also earned her Best Supporting Actress award at the ASEAN International Film Festival in Malaysia.

== Awards and nominations ==
Awards and nominations received by Anita Linda
Award (Note: Awards, festivals, honors and other miscellaneous organizations are listed in alphabetical order.)	Year (Note: Indicates the year of ceremony.)	Category	Nominated work	Result	Ref.
ASEAN International Film Festival	2013	Best Supporting Actress	Sta. Niña	Won	
Ani ng Dangal by the National Commission for Culture and the Arts	2011	Cinema Award	Lola	Won	
Ani ng Dangal by the National Commission for Culture and the Arts	2014	Cinema Award	Herself	Won	
Asia-Pacific Film Festival	2011	Best Actress	Lola	Won	
Cannes Film Festival	1980	Palme d'Or	Jaguar	Nominated	
Cinemanila International Film Festival	2008	Best Actress	Adela	Won	
Cinemalaya Philippine Independent Film Festival	2012	Best Supporting Actress	Sta. Niña	Won	
Cultural Center of the Philippines	1994	Gawad CCP sa Sining	Herself	Won	
Eastwood City Walk of Fame	2006	Inductee	Herself	Won	
Fajr International Film Festival	2011	Best Actress	Lola	Won	
FAMAS Awards	1953	Best Actress	Sawa sa Lumang Simboryo	Nominated	
FAMAS Awards	1962	Best Actress	Nag-uumpugang bato	Nominated	
FAMAS Awards	1970	Best Supporting Actress	Bimbo	Nominated	
FAMAS Awards	1975	Best Supporting Actress	Tatlo, Dalawa, Isa	Won	
FAMAS Awards	1977	Best Supporting Actress	Mrs. Teresa Abad Ako Po si Bing	Nominated	
FAMAS Awards	1979	Best Supporting Actress	Mahal Mo, Mahal Ko	Nominated	
FAMAS Awards	1982	Best Supporting Actress	Bakit Bughaw ang Langit	Nominated	
FAMAS Awards	1999	Best Supporting Actress	Babae sa Bubungang Lata	Won	
Gawad PASADO Awards	2011	Lifetime Achievement Award	Herself	Won	
Gawad Tanglaw Awards	2009	Best Actress (tied with Judy Ann Santos)	Adela	Won	
Gawad Tanglaw Awards	2011	Best Actress	Herself	Won	
Gawad Urian Awards	1980	Best Supporting Actress	Jaguar	Nominated	
Gawad Urian Awards	1982	Lifetime Achievement Award	Herself	Won	
Gawad Urian Awards	1987	Best Supporting Actress	Takaw Tukso	Won	
Gawad Urian Awards	1989	Best Supporting Actress	Itanong Mo sa Buwan	Nominated	
Gawad Urian Awards	1999	Best Supporting Actress	Babae sa Bubungang Lata	Nominated	
Gawad Urian Awards	2008	Best Supporting Actress	Tambolista	Nominated	
Gawad Urian Awards	2009	Best Actress	Adela	Nominated	
Gawad Urian Awards	2010	Best Actress (tied with Rustica Carpio)	Lola	Won	
Gawad Urian Awards	2011	Best Supporting Actress	Presa	Nominated	
Gawad Urian Awards	2020	Best Actress	Circa	Nominated	
Golden Screen Awards	2008	Gawad Lino Brocka Lifetime Achievement Award	Herself	Won	
Golden Screen Awards	2009	Best Performance by an Actress in a Supporting Role	Adela	Nominated	
Golden Screen Awards	2010	Best Performance by an Actress in a Lead Role-Drama	Lola	Nominated	
Golden Screen Awards	2013	Best Performance by an Actress in a Supporting Role	Sta. Niña	Won	
ICON Awards	2006	Icon Award	Herself	Won	
International Film Festival of Kerala	2012	Suvarna Chakoram (Golden Crow Pheasant) Award	Sta. Niña	Won	
Las Palmas de Gran Canaria International Film Festival	2010	Best Actress	Lola	Won	
Luna Awards	1996	Lifetime Achievement Award	Herself	Won	
Luna Awards	2000	Best Supporting Actress	Isusumbong Kita sa Tatay Ko	Nominated	
Luna Awards	2013	Best Supporting Actress	Sta. Niña	Nominated	
Maria Clara Awards	1952	Best Actress	Sisa	Won	
Metro Manila Film Festival	2004	Gawad Maynila Lifetime Achievement Award	Herself	Won	
Miami International Film Festival	2010	Grand Jury Prize	Lola	Won	
National Commission for Culture and the Arts	2005	Pama-As Gintong Bai Award	Herself	Won	
PMPC Star Awards for Movies	1988	Ulirang Artista Award	Herself	Won	
PMPC Star Awards for Movies	1999	Movie Supporting Actress of the Year	Babae sa Bubungang Lata	Nominated	
PMPC Star Awards for Movies	2013	Movie Supporting Actress of the Year	Sta. Niña	Nominated	
PMPC Star Awards for Television	2019	Outstanding Stars of the Century	Herself	Won	
Sandaan: Dunong ng Isang Ina	2019	Lifetime Achievement Award	Herself	Won	
Young Critics Circle	1999	Best Performance	Babae sa Bubungang Lata	Nominated	
Young Critics Circle	2008	Best Performance	Adela	Won	
Young Critics Circle	2009	Best Performance	Lola	Nominated	
Young Critics Circle	2014	Best Performance	Porno	Nominated	
