= Cinemanila International Film Festival =

Film festival held in Manila, Philippines

The Cinemanila International Film Festival is an annual film festival held in Manila, Philippines. It was founded by Filipino filmmaker Amable "Tikoy" Aguiluz in 1999. The focus of the festival is on the cinema of the Philippines as well as Southeast Asian cinema.

The Cinemanila icon is the bulol, a deity whose presence ensures good harvest. The Cinemanila International Film Festival invokes the bulol as a blessing towards the Filipino film industry in general – as a prayer towards good harvest, a plentiful bounty of excellent Filipino films. In the festival's competitive section, the top award is the Lino Brocka Award, given in honor of the acclaimed Filipino director, Lino Brocka. Another award, the Ishmael Bernal Award for Young Cinema, was first given at the 2000 festival, in honor of Filipino director Ishmael Bernal, to young independent Filipino filmmakers.

One of Cinemanila's running components is Sine Barangay - a three-day event with free film appreciation and education workshops, culminating in an outdoor screening to barangay residents. It was previously held at the Marikina Riverbanks and Bonifacio High Street. In 2012, Cinemanila will launch the "Cinemanila Moonlight Series", regular outdoor screenings expanded from Sine Barangay, to take place over the course of Manila's dry season.

== History ==
The second Cinemanila was held from July 3 to 10, 1999 in Mandaluyong. It was the first international film festival in the Philippines since the Manila International Film Festival, which had been held in the 1980s. (There is the Metro Manila Film Festival, but it is a national festival screening only Filipino films.) The festival featured a lecture on cinematography by Australian-Hong Kong cinematographer Christopher Doyle.

The festival has typically been a low-key affair in terms of red-carpet visits by foreign celebrities. However, in 2003, the festival honored Hollywood stars with Filipino-American roots, and was graced by Lou Diamond Phillips, Tia Carrere, Dean Devlin and Rob Schneider. The same year, the first Lifetime Achievement Award was given, honoring Indonesian actress Christine Hakim.

In 2007, director Quentin Tarantino and Thai director Chatrichalerm Yukol were among the Lifetime Achievement recipients. A retrospective of Tarantino's feature films was shown, from Reservoir Dogs to Kill Bill. He attended the awards ceremony at Malacañan Palace, accepting the award from President Gloria Macapagal Arroyo. Both the president and the honoree were late to ceremony due to being stuck in a traffic jam. Tarantino, accompanied by festival founder Tikoy Aguiluz, took a pedicab to make it to the ceremony, and showed up without leather shoes as required to enter the palace. He was given a new pair of shoes by Aquiliuz.

The festival is closely identified with its founder, filmmaker Tikoy Aguiluz, who has a reputation as a maverick. In 2006, he accused the Philippine media of not doing enough to promote the festival and independent films, stating at a news conference: "All I want from you writers are three lines and a picture promoting the festival. Why do you think it's so hard for independent producers to have success here, locally? I haven't seen any support from either broadsheet or tabloids with any story on independent cinema."

Among the world community of film festivals, Cinemanila has gained respectability with its programming of independent Asian film. Jurors at past festivals have included Christian Jeune, director of the film department of the Cannes Film Festival.

Early incarnations of the festival were held outside of Manila, though still in the Metro Manila area, in Makati, and for a time was known as the Makati Cinemanila International Film Festival. In 2005, the festival moved to the Manila city limits, with screenings held at SM City Manila and Robinsons Ermita cinemas.

== Awards ==
=== 1999 ===
The inaugural year for the festival included a lecture on cinematography by Christopher Doyle. Adoor Gopalakrishnan was honored in the "Director in Focus" program.

- Lino Brocka Award: Leaf on a Pillow by Garin Nugroho (Indonesia) and The Terrorist by Santosh Sivan (India)
- Grand Jury Prize: The Terrorist by Santosh Sivan (India)
- NETPAC Jury Award
  - Winner: Birth of a Butterfly by Mojtaba Raei (Iran)
  - Special Mention: Pila Balde by Jeffrey Jeturian (Philippines)
- Best Short Film: Father’s Toys by Carol Miu-Suiet Lai (Hong Kong)

=== 2000 ===
The first year for Ishmael Bernal Award for Young Cinema, which is primarily given to alternative, independent films. The "Director in Focus" was Majid Majidi from Iran.

- Lino Brocka Award: Colour of Paradise by Majid Majidi (Iran)
- Grand Jury Prize: Yana's Friends by Arik Kaplun (Israel)
- Best Actress: Evelyne Kaplun for Yana's Friends (Israel)
- Best Documentary Film: Punitive Damage by Annie Goldson (New Zealand)
- Best Short Film: The Offering by Paul Lee (Canada)
- Ishmael Bernal Award for Young Cinema: Buwan by Peter Chua

=== 2001 ===
The "Director in Focus" was Nonzee Nimibutr from Thailand. President Gloria Macapagal Arroyo was the guest of honor.

- Lino Brocka Award: Firefly Dreams by John Williams (Japan)
- Grand Jury Prize: Roads and Bridges by Abraham Lim (US)
- NETPAC Award: Batang West Side by Lav Diaz (Philippines)
- Special Recognition Award for Career Achievement: Charlotte Rampling
- Best Short Film: Sand by Percy Fuentes (Canada)
- Ishmael Bernal Award for Young Cinema: Batang Trapo by Mes de Guzman

=== 2002 ===
The Cinemanila-ASEF Film Development Plan and a scriptwriting competition were launched. A "Direct Action Cinema" workshop was conducted by Rob Nilsson and a cinematography workshop was conducted by Pierre-William Glenn.

- Lino Brocka Award:
  - Atanarjuat: The Fast Runner by Zacharias Kunuk (Canada)
  - What Time Is It There? by Tsai Ming-liang (Taiwan)
- Grand Jury Prize: Seafood by Zhu Wen (China)
- Special Jury Prize: Una casa con vista al mar by Alberto Alvero (Venezuela)
- Kodak Vision Award for Technical Excellence in Cinematography: What Time Is It There? by Tsai Ming-liang (Taiwan)
- Best Actor:
  - Lee Kang-sheng for What Time Is It There?
  - Alejandro Trejo for A Cab for Three (Chile)
- Best Screenplay: Orlando Lubbert for A Cab for Three
- Best Actress: Aoi Miyazaki for Harmful Insect (Japan)
- NETPAC Award for Best Asian Film:
  - Winner: Hollywood Hong Kong by Fruit Chan (Hong Kong)
  - Special Mention: Harmful Insect by Akihiko Shiota (Japan)
- Ishmael Bernal Award for Young Cinema: Lolo's Child by Romeo Candido
- Best Short Film: Batinglaw by Lawrence Cordero
- Best Documentary: Case of Wilkie Duran Monte: Toxic Chemical Victim by Minnie Solomon Crouse
- Scriptwriting Competition Grand Jury Prize:
  - James Arnold B. Ladioray, Cut
  - Mario O'Hara, Hocloban
- Scriptwriting Competition Special Jury Prize
  - Anton Juan, Ugat Nating Lahat
  - Peter Solis Nery, Buyong

=== 2003 ===
A Tribute to Filipino-American Hollywood celebrities was held, honoring Lou Diamond Phillips, Tia Carrere, Dean Devlin, Fritz Friedman and Rob Schneider. The first Lifetime Achievement Award was given, honoring Indonesian actress Christine Hakim.

- Lino Brocka Award: Uzak (Distant) by Nuri Bilge Ceylan (Turkey)
- Grand Jury Prize:
  - City of God by Fernando Meirelles (Brazil)
  - The Blessing Bell by Sabu II (Japan)
- Special Jury Prize: Whale Rider by Niki Caro (New Zealand)
- Best Actor: David Gulpilil, The Tracker (Australia)
- Best Screenplay:
  - Divine Intervention by Elia Suleiman (Palestine)
  - Mr. and Mrs. Iyer by Aparna Sen (India)
- Best Actress: Vilma Santos, Dekada '70 (Philippines)
- NETPAC Award for Best Asian Film:
  - Winner: Divine Intervention by Elia Suleiman (Palestine)
  - Special Mention: Dekada '70 by Chito S. Rono (Philippines)
- Best Short Film: Liyab (Flames) by Sockie Fernandez
- Best Documentary: Riles (Life on the Tracks) by Ditsi Carolino
- Ishmael Bernal Award for Young Cinema: Binyag (Baptism) by Mariami Tanangco
- Lifetime Achievement Award: Christine Hakim (Indonesia)
- Lifetime Achievement Award: Vilma Santos (Philippines)

=== 2004 ===
The "Director in Focus" was Jafar Panahi.

- Grand Prize Lino Brocka Award: Vibrator by Ryūichi Hiroki (Japan)
- Grand Jury Prize:
  - Roads to Koktebel by Boris Khlenikov and Alexel Popogrebsky (Russia)
  - August Sun by Prassana Vithanage
- Best Actor:
  - Nikolaj Lie Kaas in Reconstruction (Denmark)
  - Gleb Puskepalis in Roads to Koktebel (Russia)
- Best Actress:
  - Katherine Luna in Babae sa Breakwater (Philippines)
  - Marina Golbahari, Osama (Afghanistan)
- NETPAC Award for Best Asian Film: Min, Ho Yuhang (Malaysia)
- Ishmael Bernal Award for Young Cinema: Bakasyon, Raya Martin
- Best Short Film: Balikbayan
- Best Documentary: Trollywood by Madeleine Farley (UK/US)
- Lifetime Achievement Award: Eddie Romero (Philippines)

=== 2005 ===
Special tributes to Roger Corman and Hong Kong filmmaker Yonfan were held. The "Director in Focus" was Raymond Red. The Lifetime Achievement Award went to Kim Dong Ho, director of the Pusan International Film Festival.

- Lino Brocka Award: The President's Last Bang by Im Sang-soo (South Korea)
- Grand Jury Prize: In Casablanca, Angels Don't Fly by Mohammed Asli (Morocco)
- Best Actor (International): Krystyna Feldman in My Nikifor (Poland)
- Best Actress (International): Fatoumata Coulibaly in Moolaade (Senegal)
- Best Picture (Local):
  - First Prize: Tuli by Auraeus Solito
  - Second Prize: Ang Daan Patungong Kalimugtong by Mes de Guzman
  - Third Prize: Ala Verde Ala Pobre by Briccio Santos
    - Assistant Editing / Translating by Darius Bautista
- Best Screenplay: Jorge Arago and Briccio Santos for Ala Verde Ala Pobre
- Best Actor: Bo Vicencio, Ala Verde Ala Pobre
- Best Actress: Ana Capri, Ala Verde Ala Pobre
- Ishmael Bernal Award for Young Cinema: Salat by John Torres (Philippines)
- Best Short Film: Salat by John Torres (Philippines)
- Best Documentary: Children of Leningradsky by Hanna Polak and Andrzei Celinski (Poland)

=== 2006 ===
Lifetime Achievement Awards were given to Aruna Vasudev and Philip Cheah during awards night at Malacañan Palace by President Gloria Macapagal Arroyo.

==== International Cinema ====
- Lino Brocka Award: Kubrador by Jeffrey Jeturian (Philippines)
- Special Jury Prize: Everlasting Regret by Stanley Kwan (Hong Kong)
- Best Actor: Alexei Chadov for 9th Company (Russia/Ukraine/Finland)
- Best Actress: Lee Young-ae for Sympathy for Lady Vengeance (South Korea)
- Ishmael Bernal Award for Young Cinema: Jobin Ballesteros for Ballad of Mimiong Minion
- Best Short Film: Hopia Express by Janus Victoria
- Best Documentary: Paper Dolls by Tomer Heymann (Israel)

==== Digital Lokal ====
- Grand Prize: Manoro by Brillante Mendoza
- Jury Prize: Squatterpunk by Khavn De La Cruz
- Best Director: Brillante Mendoza for Manoro
- Best Actress: Maricel Soriano for Numbalikdiwa
- Best Actor: Archie Adamos for Raket ni Nanay
- Audience Favorite Awards:
  - Numbalikdiwa by Bobby Bonifacio, Jr.
  - Anino ng Setyembre by Briccio Santos

=== 2007 ===
The festival was held from August 8 to 19 at Gateway Mall with an additional program from August 17 to 19 on Boracay Island. Lifetime Achievement Awards were given to Belgian director Robert Malengreau, American filmmaker Quentin Tarantino and Thai director Chatrichalerm Yukol, during awards night at Malacañan Palace by President Gloria Macapagal Arroyo.

==== International Cinema ====
- Lino Brocka Award: The Edge of Heaven by Fatih Akin (Turkey)
- Special Jury Prize: Persepolis by Marjane Satrapi and Vincent Paronnaud (France)
- Best ASEAN Film: Mukhsin by Yasmin Ahmad (Malaysia)
- Best ASEAN Short Film: Renita, Renita by Tonny Trimarsanto (Indonesia)
- Best International Short Film: Waiting Time by Chul Jung (South Korea)
- Best Ensemble: Tribu by Jim Libiran (Philippines)

==== Digital Lokal ====
- Lino Brocka Award: Autohystoria by Raya Martin
- Ishmael Bernal Award for Young Cinema: Delusions by Ernest Michael Manalastas
- Best Short Film: The Calling by Christopher Gozum
- Best Documentary: Neo-Lounge by Joanna Arong
- Best Director: Raya Martin for Autohystoria
- Best Actress:
  - Ana Capri for Ala Suerte Ala Muerte
  - Maris Dimayuga for Ala Suerte Ala Muerte

=== 2008 ===
The 10th edition of the festival took place from October 15 to 29 at the Gateway Mall Cinemas in Cubao. The festival hosted the Asian screening Of directors' fortnight films. Gloria Macapagal Arroyo, on October 20, 2008, led the awarding of winners in the 10th-2008 Cinemanila International Film Festival at Malacañan Palace's Kalayaan Hall. The President bestowed 13 out of 17 CineManila awards to Filipinos, in the following categories of the CIFF: main, Southeast Asian, local digital, Young Cinema and documentary. The President was joined in the award ceremonies by CineManila Festival director Amable "Tikoy" Aguiluz, National Commission for Culture and the Arts (NCCA) chairperson and Department of Education undersecretary Vilma Labrador, and NCCA executive director Cecile Guidote Alvarez. Cinema One Originals movies dominated the award rites.

The top Lino Brocka Grand Prize was won by Israeli film The Band's Visit, directed by Eran Kolirin. The Amazing Truth About Queen Raquela (Iceland/Philippines/France) by Olaf de fleur Johannesson, received the Grand Jury Prize. Other awards include:

- Vic Silayan Award for best actor : Kenneth Moraleda for Lucky Miles (Australia)
- Vic Silayan award for best actress : Angeli Bayani for Melancholia (Philippines)

==== Young Cinema ====
- Marlon by Ralson Jover and James Amparo as Best Documentary, - (Citation) We award the Best Documentary award to Marlon for giving a fresh look on the subject of blindness. We applaud the directors or their sharp eye for details, their patience and their restraint. They let the mundane details of the daily life of a poor blind boy speak to the audience directly but quietly... For trusting these details to resonate with the audience universally and ..for not exploiting a subject that could be easily exploited.
- Tumbang Preso by Antoinette Jadaone as Best Short Film, - (Citation) We applaud the film Tumbang Preso for the clever use of one set of dialogue to contrast and parallel the world of Estong as a child and Estong as a grown-up. The director understands the short film medium and has the discipline to work within the limitations of it to produce a fun and very watchable short film.
- Ishmael Bernal Award: Christopher Gozum for Surreal Random MMS Texts para ed Ina, Agui, tan kaamong ya makaiiliw ed sika: gurgurlis ed banua (Surreal Random MMS Texts for a mother, a sister, and a wife who longs for you: landscape with figures) - (Citation) We found Christopher Gozum’s flm inspiring. He was able to combine the beauty of Carlos Bulasan’s poetry with minimalist and random images of LCD screens, daily life, creating rhythm light and sound from them to convey the longing and displacement of a Filipino working in the Middle East. Revelatory and humbling, we hope this award will encourage the director to continue his quest of mapping the human heart through film.

==== Southeast Asia Film Competition ====
- Frou Frou... Shhh, Huwag Mong Sabihin kay Itay by Michael Juat as Best Southeast Asian Short Film - (Citation) Clever appropriation of cinematic, media and cultural clichés done with finely tuned comedy. uses a glossy exterior and high production values to deceptively comment of notions of artistic expression and satirises everything from a cynical but biting point of view.
- Confessional by Jerrold Tarog and Ruel Dahis Antipuesto as Best SEA Film, - (Citation) Clever execution of the mockumentary style to comment on the art of filmmaking, personal relationships, politics, and culture. The film was well orchestrated in the use of film making production elements to support a point of view and engage the audience. Showed great ability in amalgamating seemingly disparate elements to a cohesive whole.
- Anita Linda - Best Actress for Adela. - (Citation) A beautifully understated performance rich in emotional nuances. Showing a great reflective understanding of the relationships between the different characters within the film’s microcosm.
- Mario Maurer - Best Actor for The Love of Siam. - (Citation) Mature acting choices within a wide range of situations. Beneath a calm and placid external demeanor his performance he displayed a rich inner struggle dealing with emotional burdens, with family, friends, his social circle and his romantic and sexual awakening.

==== Digital Lokal ====
- Lino Brocka Grand Prize to Sherad Anthony Sanchez for his film Imburnal, - (Citation) Water as the greatest metaphor on the lifeblood of the Filipino – this film earnestly shows the experience is both harrowing and poignant.
- Lino Brocka Grand Jury Prize to Raya Martin for Next Attraction, - (Citation) It is a strongly structured film and Martin’s work is showing us a new path for cinematic language
- Best Actor - Carlo Aquino for Carnivore,
- Best Actress - Jodi Sta. Maria for Sisa,
- Best Director - Ato Bautista for Carnivore.

==== United Nations Millennium Development Goals Prize ====
- Zan-Ay: Candles Burning on Still Water by Nilo Tolentino

=== 2009 ===
==== International Cinema ====
- Best Actor - Alfredo Castro for Alfredo Castro,
- Best Actress - Tsilla Chelton for Pandora's Box,
- Grand Jury Prize - Tulpan by Sergey Dvortsevoy,
- Lino Brocka Prize - Hunger by Steve McQueen.

==== Southeast Asia Film Competition ====
- Best Short Film - Focal Point by Alizera Khatami and Ali Seiffouri,
- Best Film - Talentime by Yasmin Ahmad,
- Special Mention - Woman on Fire Looks for Water by Woo Ming Jin.

==== Young Cinema ====
- Best Short Film - To Siomai Love by Remton Siega Zuasola,
- Ishmael Bernal Award for Young Cinema - To Siomai Love by Remton Siega Zuasola.

==== Digital Lokal ====
- Lino Brocka Grand Jury Prize - Biyaheng Lupa by Armando Lao,
- Lino Brocka Grand Prize - Anacbanua by Christopher Gozum,
- Best Director - Christopher Gozum for Anacbanua .

=== 2010 ===
The 2010 festival opened with Pinoy Sunday by Wi Ding Ho, a Filipino comedy directed by a Malaysian born filmmaker living in Taiwan. It closed with John Sayles' Amigo.

Guests of the festival included Thai superstar Ananda Everingham, filmmaker Im Sang Soo (The Housemaid, South Korea), journalist Stephen Cremin (FilmBiz Asia), filmmaker Wi Ding Ho, filmmaker Edmund Yeo (Malaysia), Jeonju Film Festival programmers Un-seong Yoo and Ji-hoon Jo (Jeonju, South Korea), and cinematographer Yadi Sugandi (Indonesia).

==== International Competition ====
- Best Actor: Ensemble Cast of Sketches of Kaitan City (Japan)
- Best Actress: Youn Yuh-jung in The Housemaid (South Korea)
- Best Director: Im Sang-soo for The Housemaid
- Grand Jury Prize: Eastern Plays by Kamen Kalev (Bulgaria, Sweden)
- Lino Brocka Grand Prize: Sketches of Kaitan City by Kazuyoshi Kumakiri (Japan)

==== SEA Competition ====
- Best SEA Film: Ang Damgo ni Eleuteria by Remton Siega Zuasola

==== Digital Lokal ====
- Best Director: Khavn De La Cruz for Mondomanila
- Grand Jury Prize: Balangay by Sherad Anthony Sanchez
- Lino Grand Prize: Di Natatapos ang Gabi by Ato Bautista

==== Young Cinema: Documentaries in Competition ====
- Ishmael Bernal Award for Documentary: Malaya Camporedondo for Ang Panagtagpo ng Akong mga Apohan (The Philippines)
- Best Documentary: Kano: An American and his Harem by Monster Jimenez (The Philippines)

==== Young Cinema: Shorts in Competition ====
- Jury Prize: Hazard by Mikhail Red
- Ishmael Bernal Award for Young Cinema: Christian Linaban for Doktora
- Best Short Film: Nilda by Joy Aquino

=== 2011 ===
The 13th Cinemanila International Film Festival was held from November 11 to 17 in Taguig in Metro Manila screening eighty films from thirty different countries.

Lifetime Achievement Awards were given to Filipino actress Nora Aunor, and Italian director, Dario Argento.

==== International Competition ====
- Best Actress: Yoon Jeong-hee for her role in Poetry by Lee Chang-Dong (South Korea)
- Best Actor: George Pistereanu for his role in If I Want to Whistle, I Whistle by Florin Serban (Romania)
- Best Director: Nuri Bilge Ceylan for Once Upon A Time in Anatolia (Turkey)
- Grand Jury Prize: Siglo ng Pagluluwal by Lav Diaz (Philippines)
- Lino Brocka Grand Prize: Gangor by Italo Spinelli (Italy)

==== Digital Lokal ====
- Best Director: Mes De Guzman for Sa Kanto ng Ulap at Lupa
- Grand Jury Prize: Sakay sa Hangin by Regiben Romana
- Lino Grand Prize: Sa Kanto ng Ulap at Lupa by Mes de Guzman

==== SEA Competition ====
- Best Southeast Asian Film: Golden Slumbers by Davy Chou (Cambodia)
- Special Mention: Boundary by Benito Bautista (Philippines) and The Mirror Never Lies by Kamila Andini (Indonesia)

==== Young Cinema ====
- Best Short Film: 123 by Carlo Obispo
- Ishmael Bernal Award for Most Outstanding Young Filipino Filmmaker: Carlo Obispo for 123
- Special Mention: Saranghae My Tutor by Victor Villanueva

=== 2012 ===
The 14th Cinemanila International Film Festival was held from December 5 to 11, 2012 in Bonifacio Global City in Metro Manila.

Lifetime Achievement Awards were given to Italian director Sergio Leone, Filipino directors Marilou Diaz-Abaya and Celso Ad Castillo and the Thai motion picture production and distribution company Sahamongkol Film International.

==== International Competition ====
- Lino Brocka Grand Prize: Juvenile Offender by Kang Yi-kwan (Korea, 2012)
- Grand Jury Prize: If it’s Not Now, then When? by James Lee (Malaysia, 2012)
- Best Director: Carlos Reygadas for Post Tenebras Lux (Mexico, 2012) and Nawopol Thomrangrattanarit for 36 (Thailand, 2012)
- Best Actress: Oula Hamadeh for her role in Kayan (Iran/Canada/Lebanon, 2012)
- Best Actor: Seo Young-joo for his role in Juvenile Offender (Korea, 2012)

==== Digital Lokal ====
- Lino Grand Prize: Obscured Histories and Silent Longings of Daguluan’s Children by Teng Mangansakan
- Grand Jury Prize: Ang Paglalakbay ng mga Bituin sa Gabing Madilim by Arnel Mardoquio
- Best Director: Teng Mangansakan for Obscured Histories and Silent Longings of Daguluan’s Children

==== Young Cinema ====
- Best Short Film: Ang Prinsesa, Ang Prinsipe at si Marlborita by Carl Joseph Papa
- Ishmael Bernal Award: Bienvenido Ferrer III by Kabilang Dulo

=== 2013 ===
The 15th Cinemanila International Film Festival was held from December 18 to 22, 2013 in Bonifacio Global City in Metro Manila.

==== International Competition ====
- Lino Brocka Grand Prize: The Great Beauty by Paolo Sorrentino (Italy)
- Grand Jury Prize: The Missing Picture by Rithy Panh (Cambodia)
- Best Director: Kleber Mendonça Filho for Neighboring Sounds (Brazil) and, Lav Diaz for Norte, Hangganan ng Kasaysayan (Philippines)

==== Digital Lokal ====
- Lino Grand Prize: How to Disappear Completely by Raya Martin
- Best Director: Raya Martin for How to Disappear Completely

==== Young Cinema ====
- Best Short Film: Pantomina sa mga Anyong Ikinubli ng Alon by John Lazam
- Ishmael Bernal Award: Theodore Lozada for Tunga (Halved)
