= Henry Burgos =

Filipino screenwriter and director

- Education: UPLB College of Development Communication
- Writing career
- Notable works: Thy Womb; Busong (Palawan fate); Bakal Boys; Painted Reality (short film)

Henry C. Burgos is a Filipino film writer and director best known for writing feature films Thy Womb and Busong (Palawan Fate), co-writing the docu-drama Bakal Boys, and for directing the independent short film Painted Reality.

Burgos is often associated with Armando "Bing" Lao's "Found Story" movement, due to his frequent collaboration with Ralston Jover and Brillante Mendoza.

== Education ==
Burgos graduated with a bachelor's degree in Development Communication from the College of Development Communication of the University of the Philippines Los Baños.
