= Juvenile Offender =

- Film poster
- Hangul: 범죄소년
- RR: Beomjoesonyeon
- MR: Pŏmjoesonyŏn
- Directed by: Kang Yi-Kwan
- Written by: Park Joo-Young; Kang Yi-Kwan
- Produced by: Hyun Byung-Chul
- Starring: Lee Jung-Hyun; Seo Young-Joo
- Cinematography: Byun Bong-Sun
- Edited by: Park Yoo-Kyung
- Music by: Kang Min-Guk
- Distributed by: Finecut
- Release date: November 22, 2012
- Running time: 107 minutes
- Country: South Korea
- Language: Korean
- Box office: ₩81,988,800

Juvenile Offender (Korean: 범죄소년; RR: Beomjoesonyeon; lit. 'Crime Boys') is a 2012 South Korean drama film about a teenage criminal who reunites with his mother, who gave him up at birth.

It won the Special Jury Prize at the 25th Tokyo International Film Festival, and Best Actor for Seo Young-Joo. It was also awarded the Lino Brocka Grand Prize and Best Actor at the 14th Cinemanila International Film Festival as well as Best Children's Feature Film at the 2013 Asia Pacific Screen Awards.

The film was selected as the South Korean entry for the Best Foreign Language Film at the 86th Academy Awards, but it was not nominated.

== Plot ==
Jang Ji-Goo is a 16-year-old juvenile offender under probation who lives with his only known relative - his grandfather who is sick in bed all the time with severe diabetic complications. To Ji-Goo, home is only a place that stinks with sickness and school, a place to hang out. His only interest in life is his sweet new girlfriend, Kim Sae-Rom. One day, he gets caught after committing burglary with the neighborhood big boys. And without a parent to plead for him, the judge sentences Ji-Goo to the juvenile reformatory while others get lighter penalties.

Eleven months later, Ji-Goo is informed that his grandfather has died. After the funeral, his teacher tracks down Ji-Goo's mom, who he thought was dead but in fact had run away from home after giving birth to him at age 17. Ji-Goo is simply shocked to realize that he has a mother. But after he gets discharged from the juvenile reformatory, he and his young mother try to make up for their time lost. Ji-Goo starts off living together with his mother with high expectations, but he soon realizes that his mother is much too young just like himself and he comes to understand why she had to leave him right after giving birth. But when Ji-Goo falls into a similar situation with his girlfriend, his mother, who he thought would understand is appalled at the news which creates a conflict between the two.

== Cast ==
- Lee Jung-Hyun as Hyo-Seung
- Seo Young-Joo - Jang Ji-Goo
- Jun Ye-Jin as Kim Sae-Rom
- Kang Rae-yeon as Ji-Young
- Jung Suk-Yong as Kim Sun-Saeng
- Choi Won-Tae as Jae-Bum
- Kang Hyuk-Il as Ok-Hyun
- Seo Young-Hwa as Judge
- Jun Young-Woon as Jang Ji-Goo's grandfather
- Kim Kyung-Ryong as Ok-Hyun's father
- Lee Yoon-Sang as Kim Sae-Rom's father

== Release ==
The film was selected in 'Contemporary World Cinema' at 2012 Toronto International Film Festival held in September 2012.

== Awards and nominations ==
Year	Award	Category	Recipient	Result
2012	25th Tokyo International Film Festival	Best Actor	Seo Young-joo	Won
2012	14th Cinemanila International Film Festival	Best Actor	Seo Young-joo	Won
2013	56th Asia-Pacific Film Festival	Best Actor	Seo Young-joo	Nominated
2013	56th Asia-Pacific Film Festival	Best Actress	Lee Jung-hyun	Nominated
2013	49th Baeksang Arts Awards	Best Actress	Lee Jung-hyun	Nominated
2013	49th Baeksang Arts Awards	Best New Actor	Seo Young-joo	Nominated
2013	22nd Buil Film Awards	Best New Actor	Seo Young-joo	Nominated
2013	22nd Buil Film Awards	Best New Director	Kang Yi-kwan	Nominated
2013	7th Asia Pacific Screen Awards	Best Children's Feature Film	Juvenile Offender	Won

== See also ==
- List of submissions to the 86th Academy Awards for Best Foreign Language Film
- List of South Korean submissions for the Academy Award for Best Foreign Language Film
