= Manila Skies =

2009 Filipino film

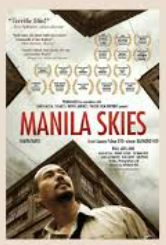
- Theatrical release poster
- Directed by: Raymond Red
- Screenplay by: Raymond Red
- Produced by: Jimmy Duavit, Roger Garcia, Dave Hukom, Butch Jimenez, Oli Laperal Jr. & Raymond Red
- Starring: Raul Arellano; John Arcilla; Ronnie Lazaro; Soliman Cruz; Karlo Altamonte; Raul Morit; Sue Prado
- Cinematography: Raymond Red
- Edited by: Raymond Red, Dave Hukom & Jay Halili
- Music by: Diwa De Leon
- Release date: 2009
- Countries: Philippines; United States
- Languages: Filipino; Tagalog

Manila Skies (Tagalog: Himpapawid) is a 2009 Philippine neo-noir film directed and written by Raymond Red. It is based on the true story of the May 2000 Philippine Airlines Flight 812 hijacking en route from Davao to Manila. This marks Red's first major feature film since winning the Cannes Palme D'Or for his short film Anino in 2000. The film stars newcomer Raul Arellano as a lone, deranged hijacker who is pushed to the edge of his limits as he struggles to make his way back home. It also features John Arcilla, Soliman Cruz, Raul Morit, Karlo Altomonte and Sue Prado.

The film premiered on October 19, 2009 at the Tokyo International Film Festival, where Red was nominated for the Tokyo Grand Prix. At the 2010 Gawad Urian Awards, the film received eleven nominations, the most of any film that year. It bagged Best Supporting Actor for Cruz, Best Supporting Actress for Prado and Best Cinematography for Red.

== Plot ==
Manila Skies follows the story of Raul (Raul Arellano), an ordinary guy from the Philippine provinces whose life is shaped by poverty, limited opportunities, and systemic social inequality. When a bag of cash and jewelry falls from the sky onto a rural farmland, a local farmer (Ronnie Lazaro) retrieves it and promises a young Raul that he will send him to Manila to study, highlighting the allure of the city as a place of opportunity.

Decades later, Raul navigates the crowded streets of Manila, carrying goods and attempting to build a life in the metropolis. He faces numerous obstacles, including bureaucratic inefficiencies, unemployment, and exposure to criminal elements. He participates in a failed attempt with friends to reclaim money that had been taken from them. Meanwhile, the film also depicts other residents of the city’s squatter communities, showing the harsh living conditions of families crowded into makeshift homes and the pervasive struggle for survival.

Driven by frustration, delusion and desperation, Raul eventually takes drastic measures, seizing control of an aircraft to demand a change in his fate.

== Characters ==
- Raul Arellano – Raul
- John Arcilla – Crispin
- Ronnie Lazaro – Raul's father
- Soliman Cruz – Juan
- Karlo Altamonte – Karlo
- Raul Morit – Morit
- Sue Prado – Diana
- Noni Buencamino
- Archie Adamos
- Nanding Josef
- Lav Diaz
- Tony Mabesa
- Mon Confiado
- Jess Evardone
- Mike Lloren
- Flor Salanga
- Ronron Villar
- Pen Medina

== Awards and recognition ==
Accolades received by Hello, Love, Goodbye
Award	Date of ceremony	Category	Recipient(s)	Result	Ref.
Gawad Urian Awards	April 29, 2010	Best Picture		Nominated	
Gawad Urian Awards	April 29, 2010	Best Director	Raymond Red	Nominated	
Gawad Urian Awards	April 29, 2010	Best Actor	Raul Arellano	Nominated	
Gawad Urian Awards	April 29, 2010	Best Supporting Actor	John Arcilla	Nominated	
Gawad Urian Awards	April 29, 2010	Best Supporting Actor	Soliman Cruz	Won	
Gawad Urian Awards	April 29, 2010	Best Supporting Actress	Sue Prado	Won	
Gawad Urian Awards	April 29, 2010	Best Screenplay	Raymond Red	Nominated	
Gawad Urian Awards	April 29, 2010	Best Cinematography	Raymond Red	Won	
Gawad Urian Awards	April 29, 2010	Best Editing	Raymond Red, Dave Hukom & Jay Halili	Nominated	
Gawad Urian Awards	April 29, 2010	Best Production Design	Danny Red	Nominated	
Gawad Urian Awards	April 29, 2010	Best Sound	Ditoy Aguila	Nominated	
Tokyo International Film Festival	October 17-25, 2009	Tokyo Sakura Grand Prix	Raymond Red	Nominated	
Young Critics Circle	April 30, 2010	Best Film	Raymond Red	Won	
Young Critics Circle	April 30, 2010	Best Performance by Male or Female, Adult or Child, Individual or Ensemble in Leading or Supporting Role	Raul Arellano	Won	
Young Critics Circle	April 30, 2010	Best Screenplay	Raymond Red	Won	
Young Critics Circle	April 30, 2010	Best Achievement in Film Editing	Raymond Red, Dave Hukom & Jay Halili	Won	
Young Critics Circle	April 30, 2010	Best Achievement in Cinematography and Visual Design	Raymond Red, Danny Red, Cesar Hernando & Ronald Red	Won	
Young Critics Circle	April 30, 2010	Best Achievement in Sound and Aural Orchestration	Diwa de Leon	Nominated	
