= Moebius (2013 film) =

2013 South Korean silent arthouse horror drama film by Kim Ki-Duk

- Film poster
- Hangul: 뫼비우스
- RR: Moebiuseu
- MR: Moebiusŭ
- Directed by: Kim Ki-duk
- Screenplay by: Kim Ki-duk
- Story by: Kim Ki-duk
- Produced by: Kim Ki-duk; Kim Woo-taek; Kim Soon-mo
- Starring: Cho Jae-hyun; Seo Yeong-ju; Lee Na-ra
- Cinematography: Kim Ki-duk
- Edited by: Kim Ki-duk
- Music by: Park In-young
- Production company: Kim Ki-Duk Film
- Distributed by: Next Entertainment World
- Release dates: October 3, 2013 (Venice); October 5, 2013 (South Korea)
- Running time: 89 minutes
- Country: South Korea

Moebius (Korean: 뫼비우스) is a 2013 South Korean silent arthouse horror drama film written and directed by Kim Ki-duk. The narrative is conveyed entirely without use of spoken dialogue, written subtitles, or intertitles. Instead, characters communicate through vocables, and share moments of intensive gazing as a substitute for conversation. Moebius is also devoid of non-diegetic sound, with the exception of two scenes which mark the beginning of the film and the conclusion leading into the end credits. Moebius was screened out of competition at the 70th Venice International Film Festival. It was initially banned in South Korea, before the Korea Media Rating Board reviewed the film and changed the rating.

== Plot ==
When the mother discovers that her husband is having an affair with a mistress, she attempts to enact her vengeance by castrating him. When her effort fails, she instead mutilates her son's genitals and cannibalizes his severed penis. The mother runs off into the night, abandoning the father and son. She passes a spiritual man on the sidewalk who is praying, and contemplates her actions.

Mourning the loss of his son's manhood, the father becomes obsessed with helping his son reclaim his sexuality through explorations of alternative modes of (primarily sadomasochistic) sexual pleasure. He also begins to research penis transplantation. As rumours of the son's penectomy begin to widely circulate, the son quickly finds himself at the bottom of the male social hierarchy and the subject of frequent bullying and assault. To regain his masculinity, he participates in a gang rape of his father's mistress. While under the judgmental gaze of the gang leader, the son feigns penetration, mimicking thrusting motions on top of the mistress to avoid suspicion.

During a stay in prison due to his participation in the gang rape, he is assaulted by fellow inmates. The father attempts to help his son by showing him how to masturbate by rubbing a rough rock against his skin. The son is released from police custody when, due to his lack of penis, it is revealed that he was unable to physically penetrate the mistress. Returning to the scene of the gang rape – the mistress's place of work – the son finds the mistress having seemingly consensual sex with the gang leader. The son joins in, and the three pleasure each other with a knife before the son aids the mistress in castrating the gang leader. The gang leader's penis is run over by a truck and is unable to be recovered.

The father learns of an experimental penile transplantation surgery. The father gives his penis to his son via the surgical procedure, but the son finds himself unable to obtain an erection. The son's possession of a penis ultimately harms his relationship with the mistress, as she displays less interest in having sex with him despite his penis. This is because it still struggles to become erect despite his attraction to her. The mistress begins a relationship with the castrated gang leader. The son sees the two of them pleasuring each other with a knife.

Having been absent since her attack on her son, the mother returns home. She attempts to make amends to the family by re-igniting her sexual relationship with the father, only to learn that he is now unable to have sex due to him having given his penis to their son. The son learns that his father's penis—now his own—responds with instinctive arousal to his mother. The mother then attempts to have sex with her son, which drives the father to a jealous rage. Failing to reclaim his penis from his son in a failed castration attempt, the father kills the mother and then himself. The son takes a gun and shoots his penis off. The film ends with the son turning to a life of spiritualism, content with his non-phallic existence. He appears to be the same spiritual man which the mother had encountered praying in the beginning of the film.

== Cast ==
- Cho Jae-hyun (as Jo Jae-hyeon) as the father
- Seo Young-joo (as Seo Young-ju) as the son
- Lee Na-ra (as Lee Eun-woo) as the mother / mistress
- Kim Jae-hong as the gang leader
- Kim Jae-rok as the doctor

== Controversy ==
=== Ratings board ban ===
Moebius was submitted to the Korea Media Rating Board three times, receiving a "restricted release" classification two times. A "restricted release" film is an effective ban – these films are required by law to be played only in a specialty licensed "restricted movie theater" according to Article 43 (Limits on Screen and distribution of Restricted Motion Pictures) of the Promotion of the Motion Pictures and Video Products Act. There are no operating "restricted movie theatres" in South Korea.

The KMRB objected to the portrayal of explicit sexual incestual scenes between the mother and son. When Moebius received a "restricted release" rating on its first review, Kim cut or modified a total of 21 scenes according to KMRB recommendation, reducing the runtime by 1 minute and 20 seconds for Moebius's second submission to the KMRB. This second, 89-minute cut of Moebius also received a "restricted release" rating. For the third and final appeal, Kim cut or edited an additional 12 scenes, reducing the runtime by 50 seconds more and removing all direct portrayals of incestual sex between the mother and son. This 87 minute, 50 second cut was given a "youth not allowed" on 5 August 2013, allowing Moebius to move ahead with its domestic release on 5 October 2013.

=== Sexual assault allegations ===
In August 2017, charges were filed by actress A – who remains anonymous with her identity protected under the Korean laws on sexual violence – through the Seoul Central District Prosecutor's Office, claiming abuse during the filming of Moebius. Actress A reported that Kim Ki-duk had slapped her across the face three times in front of the crew. Kim then forced her to take part in a violent sex scene that was unscripted, forcing her to touch another actor's penis when it had previously been arranged that a prosthesis would be used. Actress A subsequently withdrew from the production and was replaced by Lee Na-ra, which damaged her career as Kim Ki-Duk Film stated that she left the production without taking the proper leave. Actress A took her grievances to the Korea Federation of Movie Workers' Union, and an independent investigation was conducted prior to charges being filed at the Prosecutor's Office. "It's not that I'm showing up after four years to bring charges," actress A spoke at the Korea Sexual Violence Relief Center, "this case has taken a whole four years just to bring charges." The Prosecutor's Office ultimately ruled partially in favor of actress A, charging Kim a fee of ₩5 million ($4,450) for physical assault in December of that same year. The Office did not charge Kim for sexual molestation, citing a lack of physical evidence. The Office also did not follow up on charges of coercion and defamation.

On 6 March 2018, an episode of PD Note aired in which actress A alongside two other anonymous women came forward with multiple accounts of physical assault, sexual assault, and rape against Kim. These accounts also incriminated Moebius lead Cho Jae-hyun, a frequent collaborator of Kim. Prior to the airing of this episode of PD Note, in February 2018, Cho had publicly apologized for allegations of sexual molestation which were publicly brought up against him by students whom he had instructed at Kyungsung University. He subsequently resigned his post as professor. Cho was also written out of his ongoing role on medical thriller Cross.

== Release ==
The film screened in April 2014 at the Stanley Film Festival, and in November 2014 at the London Korean Film Festival.

== Critical response ==
Andrew Chan of the Film Critics Circle of Australia writes, "To call Moebius daring is actually an understatement, as it is more than that, it is a film that will haunt you, lingers with you and perhaps disturb you till you never think about it again".
