= Kabukicho Love Hotel =

2014 film

- Film poster
- Directed by: Ryūichi Hiroki
- Written by: Haruhiko Arai; Futoshi Nakano
- Starring: Shota Sometani; Atsuko Maeda
- Cinematography: Atushiro Nabeshima
- Music by: Ayano Tsuji
- Release dates: 7 September 2014 (TIFF); 25 January 2015 (Japan)
- Running time: 135 minutes
- Country: Japan
- Languages: Japanese; Korean

Kabukicho Love Hotel (Japanese: さよなら歌舞伎町, Hepburn: Sayonara Kabukichō; lit. "Goodbye Kabukichō") is a 2014 Japanese drama film directed by Ryūichi Hiroki, starring Shota Sometani and Atsuko Maeda. It was selected to be screened in the Contemporary World Cinema section at the 2014 Toronto International Film Festival.

== Plot ==
Having lost his job at a five-star hotel, Toru (Shota Sometani) is now a manager of a love hotel in the titular district of Kabukicho in Tokyo. Toru's girlfriend, Saya (Atsuko Maeda) is an aspiring singer. Saya doesn't know that Toru manages a love hotel. She ends up being a client there one night, where Toru discovers that she has agreed to sleep with a music executive so she can get a record deal.

== Cast ==
- Shota Sometani as Toru Takahashi
- Atsuko Maeda as Saya Iijima
- Lee Na-ra as Hena
- Roy (Son Il-kwon) as Chong-su
- Kaho Minami as Satomi Suzuki
- Yutaka Matsushige as Yasuo Ikezawa
- Nao Ōmori as Kazuki Takenaka
- Jun Murakami as Kagehisa Amemiya
- Tomorowo Taguchi as Masashi Kubota
- Shugo Oshinari as Masaya Hayase
- Miwako Wagatsuma as Hinako Fukumoto
- Aoba Kawai as Rikako Fujita
- Tom Miyazaki as Ryuhei Shinjo
- Asuka Hinoi as Miyu Takahashi

== Reception ==
Don Brown of Asahi Shimbun called it "one of Hiroki's most purely entertaining and satisfying films to date".
