= Rustica Carpio =

Filipino actress (1930–2022)

- Born: Rustica Cruz Carpio; August 9, 1930; Paombong, Bulacan, Philippine Islands
- Died: February 1, 2022 (aged 91); Imus, Cavite, Philippines
- Citizenship: Filipino
- Education: Polytechnic University of the Philippines (AA); Manuel L. Quezon University (BA); New York University (MA); University of Santo Tomas (PhD)
- Occupations: Actress; academic; public servant
- Years active: 1952–2022
- Awards: Gawad Urian for Best Actress; Don Carlos Palanca Memorial Awards for Literature

Rustica Cruz Carpio (August 9, 1930 – February 1, 2022) was a Filipino actress, scholar, playwright, philanthropist, and public servant. Most notably an actress, she performed on stage, film, and television. She received acclaim for her role as Lola Puring in Grandmother (Filipino: Lola), a film by Filipino director Brillante Mendoza which was selected to compete in various international film festivals, including Venice and Dubai. For her acting work in the said film, she was critically well-received, earning nominations and awards, winning the Gawad Urian for Best Actress, the Crystal Simorgh for Best International Actress at the Fajr International Film Festival in Iran, and the Las Palmas International Film Festival Best Actress award in Spain.

A scholar, she wrote more than 200 academic and journalistic articles, books, scripts, and stories published locally and abroad. She served also as dean of two schools of communication in Manila, and a graduate school.

== Early life and education ==
Carpio was born on August 9, 1930, at Paombong, in the province of Bulacan, Philippines. She recounted that she started to sing in an operetta at age 10. She was educated at the Philippine College of Commerce in Manila, now Polytechnic University of the Philippines (PUP), where she finished an associate degree in commercial science with honors. She then pursued a Bachelor of Arts, major in English at Manuel L. Quezon University (MLQU), where she graduated magna cum laude. After winning Fulbright and International House scholarships, she chose New York University (NYU) in the United States for her graduate work, earning a Master of Arts in education, major in speech education in 1956 at NYU's Steinhardt School of Culture, Education, and Human Development. At the University of Santo Tomas (UST) in Manila, she obtained her PhD in literature, meritissimus, in 1979.

She was a UNESCO fellow in Dramatic Arts at the National School of Drama and Asian Theatre Institute in New Delhi, India.

== Career ==
Carpio's first film role was in Ishmael Bernal's Nunal sa Tubig in 1975, and in the more recent roles in Captive, where she played a social worker. In Aparisyon, she was cast as a troubled nun, and in Ano ang Kulay ng Nakalimutang Pangarap, where she magnified the dilemma of an aging nanny. Aside from being an actress, she was also a Palanca Award-winning essayist, and a playwright and stage director in different plays under her name.

Outside the entertainment industry, she was also an educator. Dr. Carpio organized PUP's Department of Mass Communication in 1987, and became its first chairperson and first dean of the College of Communication. She was also the founder of the Master in Mass Communication program in 1990 of the PUP Graduate School. She was proponent for the building of PUP's Claro M. Recto Auditorium, and in 1998, she conceptualized the establishment of the Mass Communication Center in PUP. She also served as the inaugural dean of the College of Mass Communication at Pamantasan ng Lungsod ng Maynila (PLM).

Carpio served as consultant in arts and culture to PUP and was executive director of the President's Committee on Culture at Far Eastern University (FEU). She was a lecturer of mass communications, literature, and theatre arts at PUP, UST, PLM and FEU.

She served also as public servant and was appointed to various government posts in the Philippines, such as the Movie and Television Review and Classification Board (MTRCB), where she served as board member from 1996 to 1998, Videogram Regulatory Board (1998 to 2000), she was a member of the Movie Committee on Appeals.

== Death ==
Carpio died in Imus, Cavite, on 1 February 2022, at the age of 91.

== Filmography ==
=== Film ===
Year	Title	Role	Note(s)	Ref(s).
1976	Nunal sa Tubig	Chayong		
1977	Hubad Na Bayani			
1977	Walang Katapusang Tag-araw			
1978	Pinagbuklod ng Pag-ibig			
1979	Menor de Edad			
1980	Bona	Bona's mother		
1981	Rampador Alindog (Barako ng Cavite)			
1981	Nagbabagang Lupa... Nagbabagang Araw			
1981	Tondo Girl			
1982	Katas ng Langis			
1982	Lalaki Ako			
1983	Of the Flesh	Talia	Original title: Karnal	
1985	Ma'am May We Go Out?	Principal Quirina Landicho		
1992	Mahal Kita, Walang Iba	Bank customer		
1994	Shake, Rattle & Roll V	Aling Sela	Segment "Maligno"	
1995	The Marita Gonzaga Rape-Slay: In God We Trust!			
1995	Salamat sa Lotto, Linggo-Linggo Doble-Pasko!			
1997	Damong Ligaw			
1997	Rizal sa Dapitan	Teodora Alonso Realonda		
1997	Kesong Puti			
2001	Vital Parts		Also known as Body Parts	
2009	Grandmother	Lola Puring	Original title: Lola	
2010	Tarima			
2012	Captive	Soledad		
2013	Ano ang Kulay ng Mga Nakalimutang Pangarap?			
2015	#WalangForever			

=== Television ===
Year	Title	Role	Notes
1993	Noli Me Tangere	Hermana Pule	
2010	Momay	Ingkang Tale / Lola Natalie	
2011	100 Days to Heaven	Kayang Lim	
2011	Amaya	Uray Digan	Guest cast
2011	Wansapanataym		Episode: "Housemates ni Lola"
2012	Wako Wako		Guest cast
2015	Magpakailanman		Episode: "Inang Yaya"

== Awards ==
=== Awards and nominations ===
- Nominated – Movie Actress of the Year – 2014 PMPC Star Awards for Movies, for the film Ano ang Kulay ng Mga Nakalimutang Pangarap?
- Won – Lifetime Achievement Award – 2014 PMPC Star Awards for Movies
- Won – Best Performance by an Actress in a Leading Role (Drama) – 2014 ENPRESS Golden Screen Awards, for the film Ano ang Kulay ng mga Nakalimutang Pangarap?
- Won – Crystal Simorgh for Best International Actress – 2011 Fajr International Film Festival, for the film Lola
- Won – Best Supporting Actress – 9th Gawad Tanglaw Awards, for the film Tarima
- Won – Best Actress – 2010 Gawad Urian Awards, for the film Lola
- Won – Best Actress – 2010 Las Palmas International Film Festival, for the film Lola
- Won – Ani ng Dangal Award from the National Commission for Culture and the Arts, for the film Lola
- Won – Lifetime Achievement Award – 2010 FAMAS Awards
- Won – 2008 TOFIL Awardee for Arts and Culture
- Won – Special Mention for Essay, Filipino Division – 1988 Palanca Awards, for the entry "Talinhaga, Hinaing at Pag-ibig ng Isang Makata”
