= Seo Young-joo =

South Korean actor

- Born: February 16, 1998 (age 28); Seoul, South Korea
- Education: Sejong University
- Occupation: Actor
- Years active: 2008–present
- Agent: Finecut Entertainment

Korean name
- Hangul: 서영주
- Hanja: 徐榮柱
- RR: Seo Yeongju
- MR: Sŏ Yŏngju

Seo Young-joo (born February 16, 1998) is a South Korean actor. He won Best Actor at the Tokyo International Film Festival and Cinemanila International Film Festival for his performance in Juvenile Offender (2012).

== Filmography ==
=== Film ===
Year	Title	Role	Notes/Ref(s).
2008	A Frozen Flower	Young Han-baek	
2009	Bloody Innocent	11-year-old Dong-sik (Chapter 4: 1997)	
2012	The Thieves	Young Macao Park	
2012	Juvenile Offender	Jang Ji-gu	
2013	Moebius	Son	
2015	The Treacherous	Young Im Sung-jae	
2016	The Age of Shadows	Joo Dong-sung	
2017	Snowy Road	Kang Young-joo	
2018	Dong-hwa	Dong-hwa	
2019	Lingering		
2021	Ten Months	Yoon-ho	
2022	Open the Door	Chi-hoon	Premiere at 27th BIFF

=== Television series ===
Year	Title	Role	Notes	Ref(s).
2009	Hero	Jin Do-hyuk (young)		
2010	First Marriage	Lee Chang-soo (15-year-old)		
2011	Listen to My Heart	Jang Joon-ha/Bong Ma-roo (young)		
2011	Gyebaek	Gyo-ki (teen)		
2012	Fashion King	Kang Young-gul (young)		
2012	May Queen	Jang Il-moon (young)		
2012	Family Portrait	Han Jin-woo		
2013	Golden Rainbow	Kim Man-won (teen)		
2014	KBS Drama Special	Seok-joo	episode: "Youth"	
2015	Snowy Road	Kang Young-joo		
2015	Hello Monster	Lee Jung-ha	guest, episodes 6-7	
2016	Solomon's Perjury	Lee So-woo		
2017	Girls' Generation 1979	Bae Dong-moon		
2019	Beautiful World	Han Dong-soo		
2020	Nobody Knows	Kim Tae-hyung		
2023	Tale of the Nine Tailed 1938	Satori		
2023	The Killing Vote	Kim Ji-hoon		
2024	Begins ≠ Youth	Kim Do-geon		

== Awards and nominations ==
Year	Award	Category	Nominated work	Result
2012	14th Cinemanila International Film Festival	Best Actor	Juvenile Offender	Won
2012	25th Tokyo International Film Festival	Best Actor	Juvenile Offender	Won
2013	56th Asia-Pacific Film Festival	Best Actor	Juvenile Offender	Nominated
2013	49th Baeksang Arts Awards	Best New Actor (Film)	Juvenile Offender	Nominated
2013	22nd Buil Film Awards	Best New Actor	Juvenile Offender	Nominated
2013	34th Blue Dragon Film Awards	Best New Actor	Moebius	Nominated
2015	8th Korea Drama Awards	Best New Actor	Snowy Road	Nominated
2017	KBS Drama Awards	Best Actor in a One-Act/Special/Short Drama	Girls' Generation 1979	Nominated
