= Lee Eun-woo =

South Korean actress (born 1980)

Lee Na-ra
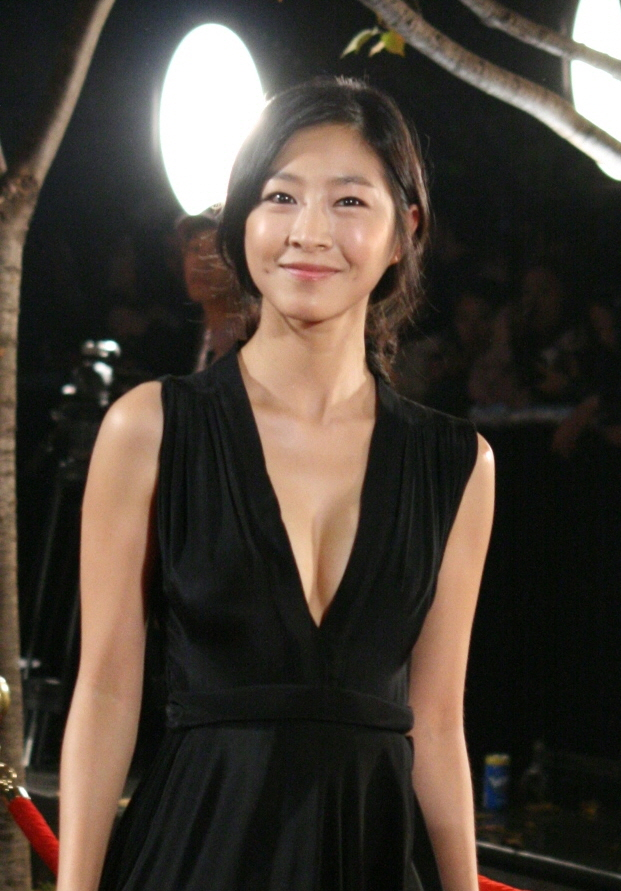
- Lee at Style Icon Awards in 2011.
- Born: August 22, 1980 (age 46); South Korea
- Occupation: Actress

Lee Na-ra (born August 22, 1980) is a South Korean actress. She has worked on films such as Moebius and Kabukicho Love Hotel. In 2013, she was nominated for Best New Actress at the 34th Blue Dragon Film Awards.

== Filmography ==
Feature films

- Romantic Heaven (2011)
- Moebius (2013)
- An Ethics Lesson (2013)
- Gyeongju (2014)
- One on One (2014)
- Kabukicho Love Hotel (2014)
- Alive (2015)
- The Tiger: An Old Hunter's Tale (2015)
- Black Money (2019)

Television series

- Signal (2016)
- While You Were Sleeping (2017)
- Priest (2018)
- The Good Detective (2022)
- Somebody (2022)
