= Thy Womb =

- Theatrical movie poster for the 2012 Metro Manila Film Festival
- Directed by: Brillante Ma. Mendoza
- Screenplay by: Henry Burgos
- Produced by: Melvin Mangada; Tong S. Puno; Brillante Ma. Mendoza; Jaime Santiago
- Starring: Nora Aunor; Bembol Roco; Lovi Poe
- Cinematography: Odyssey Flores
- Edited by: Kats Serraon
- Music by: Teresa Barrozo
- Production companies: Center Stage Productions; Film Development Council of the Philippines
- Distributed by: Solar Films
- Release dates: September 6, 2012 (Venice Film Festival); December 25, 2012 (Philippines)
- Running time: 105 minutes
- Country: Philippines
- Languages: Filipino; Tagalog; Sinama; Tausug; Arabic
- Budget: ₱2 million
- Box office: ₱5.1 million

Thy Womb (Filipino: Sinapupunan) is a 2012 Filipino drama film starring Nora Aunor, Bembol Roco, Mercedes Cabral, and Lovi Poe. Produced by Center Stage Productions and the Film Development Council of the Philippines (FDCP), Melvin Mangada and Jaime Santiago, the film was written by Henry Burgos and directed by Brillante Mendoza. The film was one of the eight official entries to the 2012 Metro Manila Film Festival.

The film competed for the Golden Lion at the 69th Venice International Film Festival. Although it did not bag the top honors, Thy Womb was awarded three special prizes by other Italian film groups — La Navicella Venezia Cinema Award, the P. Nazareno Taddei Award - Special Mention, and the Bisato d' Oro Award for Best Actress (for Nora Aunor) given by an independent Italian critics group called Premio Della Critica Indipendiente. The film was also invited to the 37th Toronto International Film Festival and the 17th Busan International Film Festival. Aunor's performance was universally acclaimed by local and foreign film critics.

The film was referred to as "The Philippines' principal trophy" in Encyclopædia Britannica's section discussing the previous year's films in the Britannica Book of the Year 2013.

== Plot ==
Shaleha (Nora Aunor) and her husband, Bangas-An (Bembol Roco), are an elderly Tausug couple in a village in Tawi-Tawi. Shaleha is a village midwife and helps deliver a baby in a stilt hut. Bangas-An helps with the process. Once the baby is successfully delivered, Shaleha asks for the child’s umbilical cord. A storage cabinet of Shaleha shows several cords that she has requested in previous childbirths, showing that she has assisted in the delivery of many children in the community.

Later while weaving banig, Shaleha asks Bangas-An whether they should adopt a child, so they can have a child at home as Shaleha is not able to bear a child. Bangas-An hesitates, stating that the previous child they adopted was taken from them. It is not revealed how the child was taken, whether the child died or was taken by the biological parents. The idea of Bangas-An taking another wife is brought up, so that the new woman can bear a child for the home, since under Muslim law, men can take up to four wives, provided he can provide for her financially, and with the consent of the prior wife.

The presence of military and gunned men is a recurring theme. In a scene early in the movie, Shaleha and her husband are fishing in open water. They are able to have a bountiful catch but an encounter with gunned men leaves Bangas-An shot and their catch of fish are seized. Shaleha tends to her husbands wounds using folk medicine. In the scene with a floating market, Shaleha’s purchase of sweet potatoes are spilled on the ground as military men bump into her while running to an encounter. In a later scene, Shaleha and Bangas-An assist in a traditional wedding of a young couple, Aisha (Mercedes Cabral) and Nurjay. The wedding dance between bride and groom and disrupted with gunfire heard from a distance. Shaleha insists that the wedding dance continue. The newly-wed couple are disturbed but continue the traditional dance.

Shaleha starts the process of finding a suitable bride. While selling their dried fish products in a floating market, Shaleha asks a woman that they encounter whether she would like to be her husband’s second wife. The woman does not answer. In the floating market, Shaleha and her husband run errands separately while selling their dried fish products. Shaleha eyes a beautiful veil but does not purchase it, saying that it is too expensive. Upon her return to her boat, Bangas-An reveals that he has purchased a beautiful veil for her, similar to the one she was eyeing. The search for a suitable bride continues, with a planned rendezvous with a potential bride in the mosque spurred due to the potential bride no showing up. Shaleha rationalizes that it is better for her to be involved in the process, rather than for her husband to fool around on his own.

Later, a wedding negotiator informed Shaleha that he was able to find a willing bride for Bangas-An, but the bride was requesting a dowry of PHP150,000. Since the couple’s savings amounted to only PHP50,000, the couple resorted to seeking additional funds from associates for the dowry. The couple also sold the motor of their boat in order to complete the dowry. Having completed the dowry, the couple journey to the prospective bride’s residence together with village elders, to initiate the marriage proposal. During the proposal, the bride’s mother accepts the dowry presented, and compliments Shaleha for her strength of character. The prospective bride, Mersila (Lovi Poe), then asks to speak with Bangas-An alone. Mersila asks Bangas-An if he is fully aware of all the conditions of the dowry. It is revealed that Shaleha had agreed to Mersila’s condition that once she is able to produce a child for them, Bangas-An is to divorce Shaleha. Later at home, Bangas-An tearfully assists Shaleha in her weaving, acknowledging her sacrifice. The couple has sexual intercourse.

In the final scene, Shaleha assists in the birth of Mersila’s child with Bangas-An as midwife. It is revealed that she bore a son. Shaleha asks for the child’s umbilical cord, and Mersila agrees albeit in a dismissive manner. Shaleha cradles the child but Bangas-An impatiently asks for the child to be handed to Mersila as the mother. As Shaleha hands the child to Mersila, a large flock of birds fly across the horizon and surprises her.

== Cast ==
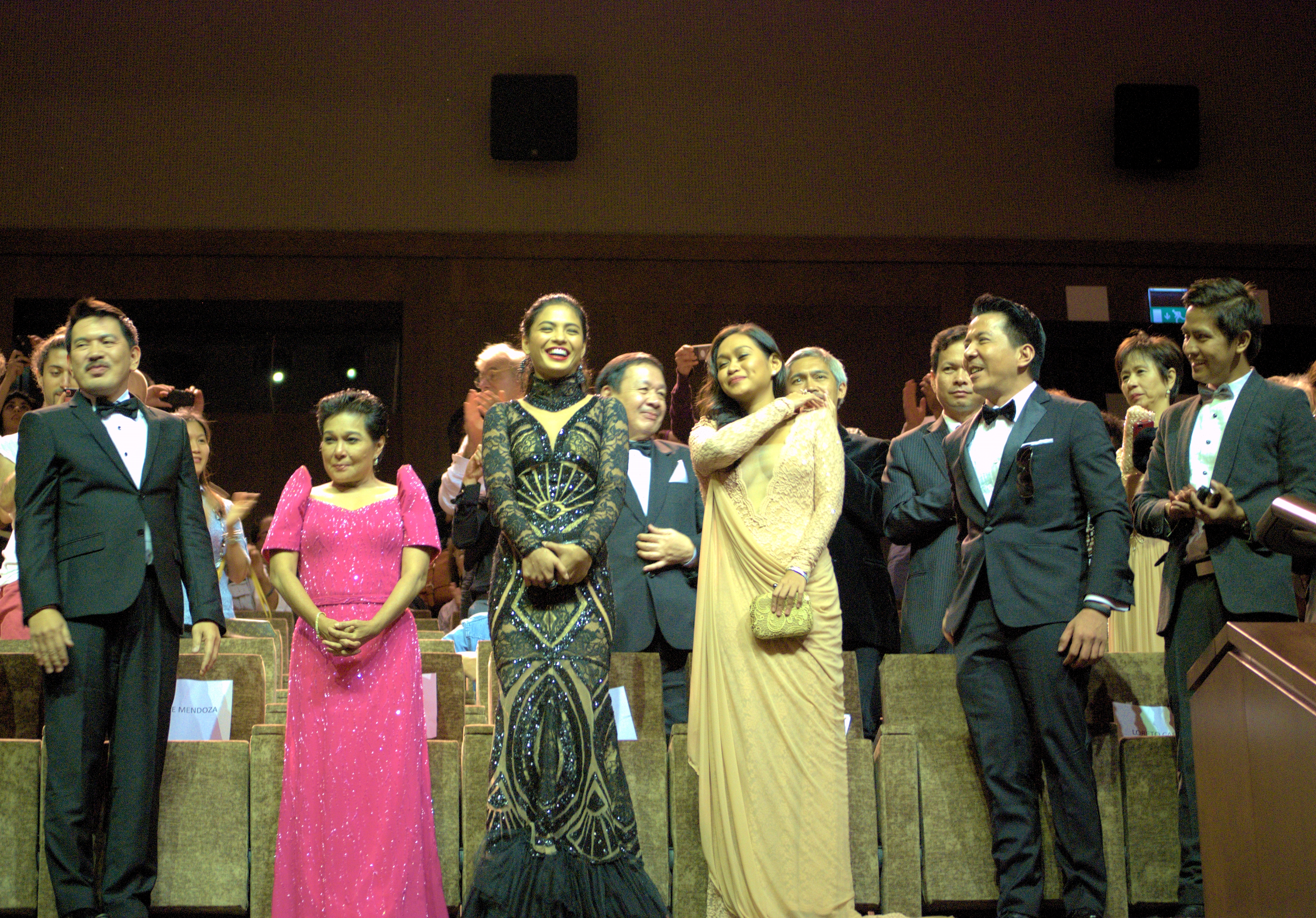
Cast of Thy Womb at the 69th Venice International Film Festival. From left to right: Nora Aunor (as Shaleha), Lovi Poe (as Mersila), and Mercedes Cabral (Aisha). Standing at the far left is the film's director Brillante Mendoza.

- Nora Aunor as Shaleha
- Bembol Roco as Bangas-An
- Lovi Poe as Mersila
- Mercedes Cabral as Aisha

== Citations and awards ==
=== International awards and recognition ===
| Year | Group | Category | Nominee | Result |
|---|---|---|---|---|
| 2013 | 3rd Sakhalin International Film festival | Best Actress | Nora Aunor | Won |
| 2013 | 3rd Sakhalin International Film festival | Best Film | | Nominated |
| 2013 | 3rd Sakhalin International Film festival | Best Director | Brillante Mendoza | Nominated |
| 2013 | 3rd Sakhalin International Film festival | Best Actor | Bembol Roco | Nominated |
| 2013 | 3rd Sakhalin International Film festival | Best Cast | | Nominated |
| 2013 | 3rd Sakhalin International Film festival | Grand Prix of the audience | | Nominated |
| 2013 | 7th Asian Film Awards | Best Actress | Nora Aunor | Won |
| 2013 | 7th Cines del Sur - Festival de Granada - Spain | Jury Special Mention | | Won |
| 2013 | 10th International Independent Film Festival - Lisbon, Portugal | Audience Award - International Competition, Observatory, Emerging Cinema, World Pulse, IndieJunior and Bran New. Feature Film | | 2nd Place |
| 2013 | 11th Asian Film Festival - Reggio Emilia, Italy | Premio Del Pubblico | | 2nd Place |
| 2012 | 6th Asia Pacific Screen Awards | Best Performance by an Actress | Nora Aunor | Won |
| 2012 | 6th Asia Pacific Screen Awards | Best Director | Brillante Mendoza | Won |
| 2012 | 69th Venice International Film Festival | Bisato d'Oro: Premio Della Critica Indipendiente for Best Actress | Nora Aunor | Won |
| 2012 | 69th Venice International Film Festival | La Navicella Award for Best Director | Brillante Mendoza | Won |
| 2012 | 69th Venice International Film Festival | P. Nazareno Taddei Award Special Mention | Brillante Mendoza | Won |
| 2012 | 69th Venice International Film Festival | Golden Lion for Best Film | | Nominated |
| 2012 | 69th Venice International Film Festival | Volpi Cup for Best Actress | Nora Aunor | Nominated |
| 2012 | 55th Asia Pacific Film Festival | Best Actress | Nora Aunor | Nominated |
| 2012 | 55th Asia Pacific Film Festival | Best Director | Brillante Mendoza | Nominated |

=== Philippine awards ===
| Year | Group | Category | Category | Result |
|---|---|---|---|---|
| 2012 | 2012 Metro Manila Film Festival | Best Actress | Nora Aunor | Won |
| 2012 | 2012 Metro Manila Film Festival | Best Director | Brillante Mendoza | Won |
| 2012 | 2012 Metro Manila Film Festival | Best Original Story | Henry Burgos | Won |
| 2012 | 2012 Metro Manila Film Festival | Best Cinematography | Odyssey Flores | Won |
| 2012 | 2012 Metro Manila Film Festival | Gatpuno Antonio J. Villegas Cultural Awards | | Won |
| 2012 | 2012 Metro Manila Film Festival | Most Gender Sensitive Film | | Won |
| 2012 | 2012 Metro Manila Film Festival | Female Star of the Night | Nora Aunor | Won |
| 2012 | BALATCA (Batangas Laguna Teachers Association for Culture and the Arts) | Pambansang Dangal ng Sining sa Pagganap | Nora Aunor | Won |
| 2013 | 61st FAMAS Awards | Presidential Award for Cinematic Excellence | Nora Aunor | Won |
| 2013 | 36th Gawad Urian Awards | Best Actress | Nora Aunor | Won |
| 2013 | 36th Gawad Urian Awards | Best Production Design | Dante Mendoza | Won |
| 2013 | 36th Gawad Urian Awards | Best Film | | Nominated |
| 2013 | 36th Gawad Urian Awards | Director | Brillante Mendoza | Nominated |
| 2013 | 36th Gawad Urian Awards | Best Actor | Bembol Roco | Nominated |
| 2013 | 36th Gawad Urian Awards | Best Screenplay | Henry Burgos | Nominated |
| 2013 | 36th Gawad Urian Awards | Best Editing | Kats Seraon | Nominated |
| 2013 | 36th Gawad Urian Awards | Best Cinematography | Odessey Flores | Nominated |
| 2013 | 36th Gawad Urian Awards | Best Music | Teresa Barrozo | Nominated |
| 2013 | 15th Gawad Pasado (Pampelikulang Samahan ng mga Dalubguro) | Pinakapasadong Pelikula | | Won |
| 2013 | 15th Gawad Pasado (Pampelikulang Samahan ng mga Dalubguro) | Pinakapasadong Direktor | Brillante Mendoza | Won |
| 2013 | 15th Gawad Pasado (Pampelikulang Samahan ng mga Dalubguro) | Pinakapasadong Aktres | Nora Aunor | Won |
| 2013 | 15th Gawad Pasado (Pampelikulang Samahan ng mga Dalubguro) | Pinakapasadong Aktor | Bembol Roco | Won |
| 2013 | 15th Gawad Pasado (Pampelikulang Samahan ng mga Dalubguro) | Pinakapasadong Katuwang Aktres | Lovi Poe | Won |
| 2013 | 15th Gawad Pasado (Pampelikulang Samahan ng mga Dalubguro) | Pinakapasadong Istorya | Henry Burgos | Won |
| 2013 | 15th Gawad Pasado (Pampelikulang Samahan ng mga Dalubguro) | Pinakapasadong Pelikula sa Paggamit ng Wika | | Won |
| 2013 | 15th Gawad Pasado (Pampelikulang Samahan ng mga Dalubguro) | Pinakapasadong Sinematograpiya | Odessey Flores | Nominated |
| 2013 | 15th Gawad Pasado (Pampelikulang Samahan ng mga Dalubguro) | Pinakapasadong Editing | Kats Seraon | Nominated |
| 2013 | 15th Gawad Pasado (Pampelikulang Samahan ng mga Dalubguro) | Pinakapasadong Dulang Pampelikula | Henry Burgos | Nominated |
| 2013 | 15th Gawad Pasado (Pampelikulang Samahan ng mga Dalubguro) | Pinakapasadong Disenyong Pamproduksyon | Dante Mendoza | Nominated |
| 2013 | 15th Gawad Pasado (Pampelikulang Samahan ng mga Dalubguro) | Pinakapasadong Paglalapat ng Tunog | Albert Michael Idioma at Addiss Tabong | Nominated |
| 2013 | 15th Gawad Pasado (Pampelikulang Samahan ng mga Dalubguro) | Pinakapasadong Musika | Teresa Barrazo | Nominated |
| 2013 | Young Critics Circle | Best Performance by Male or Female, Adult or Child, Individual or Ensemble in Leading or Supporting Role | Nora Aunor | Won |
| 2013 | Young Critics Circle | Best Screenplay | Henry Burgos | Nominated |
| 2013 | Young Critics Circle | Best Editing | Kats Seraon | Nominated |
| 2013 | Young Critics Circle | Best Achievement in Cinematography and Visual Design | Odyssey Flores (Cinematography); Dante Mendoza (Production Design) | Nominated |
| 2013 | 11th Gawad Tanglaw | Best Actress | Nora Aunor | Won |
| 2013 | 29th Star Awards for Movies | Indie Movie Cinematographer of the Year | Odyssey Flores | Won |
| 2013 | 29th Star Awards for Movies | Indie Movie Production Designer of the Year | Dante Mendoza | Won |
| 2013 | 29th Star Awards for Movies | Indie movie of the Year | | Nominated |
| 2013 | 29th Star Awards for Movies | Indie Movie Director of the year | Brillante Mendoza | Nominated |
| 2013 | 29th Star Awards for Movies | Movie Actress of the Year | Nora Aunor | Nominated |
| 2013 | 29th Star Awards for Movies | New movie Actress of the Year | Glenda Kennedy | Nominated |
| 2013 | 29th Star Awards for Movies | Indie Movie Screenwriter of the Year | Henry Burgos | Nominated |
| 2013 | 29th Star Awards for Movies | Indie Movie Editor of the Year | Kats Seraon | Nominated |
| 2013 | 29th Star Awards for Movies | Indie Movie Musical Scorer of the Year | Teresa Barrozo | Nominated |
| 2013 | 29th Star Awards for Movies | Indie Movie Sound Engineer of the Year | Albert Michael Idioma and Addiss Tabong | Nominated |
| 2013 | 10th Golden Screen Awards | Best Motion Picture-Drama | | Nominated |
| 2013 | 10th Golden Screen Awards | Best Direction | Brillante Mendoza | Nominated |
| 2013 | 10th Golden Screen Awards | Best Performance by an Actress in a Lead Role-Drama | Nora Aunor | Nominated |
| 2013 | 10th Golden Screen Awards | Best Original Screenplay | Henry Burgos | Nominated |
| 2013 | 10th Golden Screen Awards | Best Cinematography | Odessey Flores | Nominated |
| 2013 | 10th Golden Screen Awards | Best Production Design | Dante Mendoza | Nominated |
| 2013 | 10th Golden Screen Awards | Best Sound Design | | Nominated |
| 2013 | 10th Golden Screen Awards | Best Visual/Special Effects | Keep Me Posted Production Outfit | Nominated |
| 2013 | 31st Film Academy of the Philippines (Luna Awards) | Best Picture | | Nominated |
| 2013 | 31st Film Academy of the Philippines (Luna Awards) | Best Actress | Nora Aunor | Nominated |
| 2013 | 31st Film Academy of the Philippines (Luna Awards) | Best Screenplay | Henry Burgos | Nominated |
| 2013 | 31st Film Academy of the Philippines (Luna Awards) | Best Production Design | Dante Mendoza | Nominated |
| 2013 | Gawad Tangi (Kritiko ng Pelikula, Telebisyon at Musikang Pilipino) | Best Lead Actress | Nora Aunor | Won |
| 2013 | Gawad Tangi (Kritiko ng Pelikula, Telebisyon at Musikang Pilipino) | Best Art Direction | Brillante Mendoza | Won |
| 2013 | Gawad Tangi (Kritiko ng Pelikula, Telebisyon at Musikang Pilipino) | Best Picture | | Nominated |
| 2013 | Gawad Tangi (Kritiko ng Pelikula, Telebisyon at Musikang Pilipino) | Best Director | Brillante Mendoza | Nominated |
| 2013 | Gawad Tangi (Kritiko ng Pelikula, Telebisyon at Musikang Pilipino) | Best Screenplay | Henry Burgos | Nominated |
| 2013 | Gawad Tangi (Kritiko ng Pelikula, Telebisyon at Musikang Pilipino) | Best Cinematography | Odessey Flores | Nominated |
| 2013 | Gawad Tangi (Kritiko ng Pelikula, Telebisyon at Musikang Pilipino) | Best Original score | Teresa Barrazo | Nominated |
| 2013 | Gawad Tangi (Kritiko ng Pelikula, Telebisyon at Musikang Pilipino) | Best Editing | Kats Seraon | Nominated |
| 2013 | Gawad Tangi (Kritiko ng Pelikula, Telebisyon at Musikang Pilipino) | Best Ensemble | | Nominated |
| 2013 | Gawad Tangi (Kritiko ng Pelikula, Telebisyon at Musikang Pilipino) | Best Language | | Nominated |
| 2013 | 1st Philippine Edition Movie Awards | Best Drama Movie | | Won |
| 2013 | 1st Philippine Edition Movie Awards | Favorite Actress - Drama | Nora Aunor | Won |
| 2013 | 1st Philippine Edition Movie Awards | Favorite Actor - Drama | Bembol Roco | Won |
| 2013 | 1st Philippine Edition Movie Awards | Favorite Director | Brillante Mendoza | Nominated |
| 2013 | 1st Philippine Edition Movie Awards | Favorite Actress - Drama | Lovi Poe | Nominated |
| 2014 | PPA Sisa Media Awards | Outstanding Female Character in a Mainstream Filipino Film | Nora Aunor | Won |
