= Kinatay =

2009 thriller film by Brillante Mendoza

- Film poster
- Directed by: Brillante Mendoza
- Written by: Armando Lao
- Produced by: Didier Costet; Ferdinand Lapuz
- Starring: Coco Martin
- Cinematography: Odyssey Flores
- Edited by: Kats Serraon
- Music by: Teresa Barrozo
- Production companies: Centerstage Productions; SWIFT Productions
- Distributed by: Nettai Museum (Japan); Équation Distribution (France); Film1 Sundance Channel (Netherlands)
- Release dates: 17 May 2009 (Cannes); 23 September 2009 (Philippines)
- Running time: 105 minutes
- Countries: Philippines; France; Japan; Netherlands
- Language: Tagalog

Kinatay (transl. Butchered or English: The Execution of P) is a 2009 thriller film directed by Brillante Mendoza and written by Armando Lao. The story is centered on a criminology student (Coco Martin) who accidentally joins a syndicate to make enough money for his family, and gets involved in murder and dismembering of an erring drug dealer.

The film premiered at the 62nd Cannes Film Festival, where it won the Best Director Award, the first Filipino film to do so, although the film was notorious for being critically panned by critics including Roger Ebert. The film was included in the 2009 Cinemalaya Film Festival.

== Plot ==
Newly-wedded Criminology student Peping works as a part-time drug money collector for a shady syndicate. During a routine collection of drug money one night at Luneta Park, his friend Abyong informs him that their boss Kap (or Vic) requires his presence for another secret "operation". Peping reluctantly agrees and they enter a van parked nearby, where four other men (Kap, Sarge, Chico, and driver Rommel) were waiting.

The van stops by a night club and Sarge convinces prostitute Madonna (or Gina) to speak to Kap in the van. Inside the van, Madonna is abruptly beaten and restrained with duct tape. As the van is about to enter the NLEX tollway, an unidentified boss (Gen) calls Kap and orders them to put down Madonna. Sarge and Chico beat her unconscious and the group believes she is dead. At the expressway, a police car is in pursuit but eventually overtakes and arrests another driver.

The men stop at a remote house and carry Madonna's body to the basement. Sarge throws a bucket of water to find Madonna still alive. Peping learns from Abyong that Madonna had a debt of more than ₱100,000.00 worth of drugs. Kap orders him, Abyong and Rommel to buy food and liquor, as Gen is still in a meeting. Inside the van, Abyong calms down Peping and gives him a licensed gun—a gift from Kap and the "cure for nervousness". As they stop by a local store, Rommel tells Peping to buy balut from the nearby bus station. Peping buys and attempts to escape by bus but is forced to return to the van.

Back at the house, the other men enter the basement after Kap receives a call from Gen implying that it is time. Madonna begs for forgiveness from Kap but Kap leaves her, insisting that "business is business". Madonna is beaten by Sarge and raped by Chico; she is then killed by Chico with a bolo knife, and her remains are dismembered and placed in sacks. The men carry the sacks to the van and clean the room of evidence.

Inside the van, the men indiscriminately toss out the body parts along the way. They stop by a local eatery and order lechon kawali. Peping loses his appetite after throwing up in the eatery bathroom. He asks Kap if he can leave, at which Kap hands him some money for his baby's milk and says he will eventually get used to it. A news reporter is later seen interviewing residents about a severed head found in a garbage dump. Peping rides a taxi home as his wife Cecille prepares some breakfast while carrying their baby.

== Cast ==
- Coco Martin as Peping
- John Regala as Sarge
- Maria Isabel Lopez as Madonna/Gina
- Jhong Hilario as Abyong
- Julio Diaz as Vic/Kap
- Mercedes Cabral as Cecille
- Lauren Novero as Chico
- Benjie Filomeno as Rommel
- Allan Paule as Leo

== Reception ==
The review aggregation website Rotten Tomatoes offers a score of 71% from seven critics, and a rating average of 5.9 out of 10. Roger Ebert of the Chicago Sun-Times had been one of the film's most notable detractors, writing: "Here is a film that forces me to apologize to Vincent Gallo for calling The Brown Bunny the worst film in the history of the Cannes Film Festival."

=== Awards ===
- 62nd Cannes Film Festival
  - Prix de la Mise en Scene (winner)
  - Palme d'Or (nominated)
- Sitges International Film Festival
  - Best Director (winner)
  - Best Original Soundtrack (winner)
- 33rd Gawad Urian na Manunuri ng Pelikulang Pilipino (2010)
  - Pinakamahusay na Pelikula (Best Film) - winner
  - Pinakamahusay na Direksiyon (Best Director) - winner
  - Pinakamahusay na Tunog (Best Sound) - winner
- 7th Golden Screen Award (2010)
  - Best Actor (Coco Martin) - winner
  - Best Supporting Actress (Ma. Isabel Lopez) - winner
  - Best Director (winner)
- Gawad Tanglaw (2009)
  - Best Film - winner
  - Best Director (Brillante Mendoza) - winner
  - Best Supporting Actress (Ma. Isabel Lopez) - winner
  - Presidential Jury Award for Excellence in Acting (Coco Martin) - winner
