= Anita Linda =

Filipino actress (1924–2020)

- Linda in 1955
- Born: Alice Bueñaflor Lake; November 23, 1924; Pasay, Rizal, Philippine Islands
- Died: June 10, 2020 (aged 95); Parañaque, Philippines
- Resting place: Manila Memorial Park – Sucat, Paranaque, Philippines
- Occupation: Actress
- Years active: 1940–2020
- Spouse: Fred Cortes
- Relatives: Alice Lake (paternal aunt)
- Awards: Full list

Anita Linda (born Alice Bueñaflor Lake; November 23, 1924 – June 10, 2020) was a Filipino actress whose career spanned nearly eight decades and who appeared in close to 400 motion pictures. A romantic lead in her early years, she gained widespread acclaim for her portrayals of maternal, elderly roles depicting Filipino struggles and their lifestyle. Often described as the face of Philippine cinema, she was one of the top box-office draws for two decades and received numerous accolades from international film festivals and domestic award-giving bodies.

== Early career ==
Linda was born Alice Bueñaflor Lake in Pasay to James Lake, an American soldier and mining engineer, and Gorgonia Bueñaflor of Iloilo. She was named after her father's sister, silent film actress Alice Lake.

Linda was discovered by renowned director Lamberto Avellana while watching a stage show at the Avenue Theater starring Leopoldo Salcedo, Lopito, among others. Then an Ilongga teenager that couldn't speak Tagalog, she had second thoughts when she was asked backstage if she wanted to become an actress. Avellana then told her to report for rehearsals for the next show and later had her fetched when she didn't appear.

Linda first did High School with no dialogue, then Biyernes sa Quiapo with Jaime dela Rosa as her leading man, then Aksesorya with Leopoldo Salcedo onstage. Avellana later gave her the screen name Anita Linda and cast her in Tia Juana, her first film at LVN Pictures. The film was completed shortly before the Japanese invasion of the Philippines, but released only in 1943.

With the film studios being shut down for the duration of the war, Linda spent the war years performing on bodabil at Avenue Theater in Manila. After the war in 1947, she was later offered a contract by Premiere Productions where she was cast by Avellana in Sekretang Hong Kong with Pugo and Togo. Her first lead role in Alyas Sakim with Pol Salcedo in 1947 was directed by Moises Cagin.

In 1951, Linda portrayed the title character in Gerardo de Leon's Sisa, a film based on the tragic character in Jose Rizal's novel Noli Me Tangere. The role garnered her the Best Actress Maria Clara award (a precursor of the FAMAS). De Leon then cast Linda in Sawa sa Lumang Simboryo (1952), a role for which Linda would be nominated for a FAMAS Best Actress Award.

== Later career ==
In the 1970s, Linda gained renewed critical acclaim in maternal roles she played for director Lino Brocka in Tinimbang Ka Ngunit Kulang (1974), Isa Dalawa Tatlo (1974) and Jaguar (1979). She would win the FAMAS Award for Best Supporting Actress for Isa Dalawa Tatlo. Linda would also be nominated for the Gawad Urian Best Supporting Actress Award for Jaguar, which was nominated for the Palme d'Or at the 1980 Cannes Film Festival. In 1982 she was given the Natatanging Gawad Urian ng Manunuri ng Pelikulang Pilipino.

Linda would appear in several leading films of the 1980s and 1990s, including Joey Gosiengfiao's Temptation Island (1980), Mike de Leon's Sister Stella L. (1984), Chito S. Roño's Itanong Mo sa Buwan (1988) and Brocka's Gumapang Ka sa Lusak (1990). For her portrayal of an aging film actress in Mario O'Hara’s Ang Babae sa Bubungang Lata (1998), Linda would receive a Star Award for Best Supporting Actress and her second FAMAS Best Supporting Actress Award. For this, she set a record as the oldest actress to ever win a FAMAS at age 74. In 1987, Linda also won a Gawad Urian Best Supporting Actress award for Takaw Tukso.

Linda remained active in the film industry as she reached her eighties, appearing in such films as Aishite Imasu 1941: Mahal Kita (2004), You Are the One (2006) and Ouija (2007). In 2009, she returned to television, starring in the ABS-CBN drama Tayong Dalawa as Kim Chiu's ruthless Chinese grandmother Lily.

Linda garnered widespread acclaim in 2008, she starred in the independent film, Adela (2008), directed by Adolfo Alix, Jr. For her performance playing the loneliness of a woman celebrating her 80th birthday alone when her children failed to visit her, she was cited as Best Actress in the 10th Cinemanila International Film Festival (Southeast Asia Film Competition), as Best Actress by the Young Critics Circle, and as Best Actress (tied with Judy Ann Santos) at the Gawad Tanglaw Awards. The New York Times film critic Stephen Holden praised Linda's performance as "quietly transfixing". In 2009, Anita Linda was given the ENPRESS Lino Brocka Lifetime Achievement Award.

She won the Best Supporting Actress award, for her performance in Sta. Niña, at the Cinemalaya 2012 under the New Breed Full Length Feature Category.

In 2014, she made a comeback on primetime television in an ensemble drama Sana Bukas pa ang Kahapon as Paulo Avelino's grandmother Lola Patchi.

== Personal life ==
She was married to actor Fred Cortes Sr. (stage name) with whom she had a son, Fred Cortes Jr. (stage name). The marriage lasted 2 years.

In January 2009, Linda was unhurt in a mugging incident that occurred while she was aboard a taxicab. In October 1950, Linda's sister Mamey was murdered in a robbery attempt at the home they had shared; Linda herself was unharmed after she and her nieces had locked themselves in a bedroom to evade the burglars.

== Death ==
Linda died on June 10, 2020. She was 95. The news was confirmed by her daughter, Francesca Legaspi by a text message to STAR news.

== Filmography ==
=== Film ===
Year	Title	Role(s)
1943	Tiya Juana	
1947	Alias Sakim	
1947	Sekretang Hong Kong	
1947	Ngayon at Kailan Man	
1948	Labi ng Bataan	
1948	Perfidia: Kataksilan	
1948	Anghel sa Lupa	
1948	Hiram na Pangalan	
1948	Wala Na Akong Luha	
1949	Ang Lumang Bahay sa Gulod	
1949	Bakit Ako Luluha?	
1949	Bandilang Basahan	
1949	Ina ng Awa	
1949	Dugo ng Katipunan	
1949	Kay Ganda ng Umaga	
1949	Kung Sakali Ma't Salat	
1949	Magkapilas ng Langit	
1949	Suwail (Naglaro ang Ligaya)	
1950	3 Balaraw	
1950	Hiwaga ng Tulay na Bato	
1950	Punglo at Pag-ibig	
1951	Kadakilaan	
1951	Kapitan Bagwis	
1951	Prinsipe Don Juan	
1951	Sisa	Sisa
1952	Luha ng Langit	
1952	Bulaklak ng Nayon	
1952	Tatlong Kabanata sa Buhay Ko	
1952	Ngipin sa Ngipin	
1953	Ang Sawa sa Lumang Simboryo	
1953	Agilang Itim	
1953	Siga-Siga	
1953	Makabuhay	
1953	Nenita Unit	
1954	Ri-Gi-Ding	
1954	Lourdes: Ang Mutya ng Paaralan	
1954	Playboy	
1954	Guwapo	
1954	Por Bida Gid	
1954	Basagulera	
1954	Bandolero	
1955	Bandilang Pula	Commander Dalia
1955	Magia Blanca	
1955	7 Maria	
1956	Takya	
1956	Ambrocia	
1956	Buhay at Pag-ibig ni Dr. Jose Rizal	
1956	Hokus-Pokus	
1956	Haring Tulisan	
1957	Viva Las Señoritas	
1957	Ukulele Boy	
1958	Mga Liham Kay Tiya Dely	
1958	Obra Maestra ("Singapore" segment)	
1958	Matandang Tinale	
1961	Nag-uumpugang Bato	
1963	Madugong Paghihiganti (The Massacre)	
1964	Naligaw na Anghel	
1964	Callejon Delinquente	
1964	Deadly Brothers	
1964	Pamatay: Kaliwa at Kanan	
1965	Darna at ang Babaing Tuod	Marta
1969	Bimbo	
1969	Born to Be Wild	
1970	Omar Cassidy and the Sandalyas Kid	
1970	The Alvarados	
1970	Mga Dugong Simaron	
1970	Because You Are Mine	
1970	Johnny Baby, Please Come Home!	
1974	Tatlo, Dalawa, Isa	
1974	Tinimbang Ka Ngunit Kulang	Gng. Ortega
1975	Lumapit, Lumayo ang Umaga	
1976	Mrs. Teresa Abad, Ako Po si Bing	
1976	Isang Pag-ibig, Isang Pangarap, at Isang Bulaklak	
1978	Katawang Alabok	Kalapati
1978	Boy Apache	
1978	Mahal Mo, Mahal Ko	
1978	Katawang Alabok	
1979	Jaguar	Mother
1979	Alabok na Ginto	
1979	Kadete	
1980	4 Na Maria	
1980	Candy	
1980	Dolphy's Angels	
1980	Kung Tawagin Siya'y Bathala	
1980	Temptation Island	
1980	Milyon	
1980	Good Morning, Sunshine	
1980	Ang Galing Galing Mo ... Mrs. Jones	
1981	Bakit Bughaw ang Langit?	Sofia
1981	Alfredo Sebastian	The Mother
1982	Pretty Boy Charlie	
1982	Pepeng Kaliwete	
1984	Lovingly Yours: The Movie (segment: Akin ang Walang Diyos)	
1984	Sister Stella L.	
1986	Iyo ang Tondo, Kanya ang Cavite	Desta
1986	Takaw Tukso	
1986	Lumuhod Ka sa Lupa	Constancia "Atang" dela Cruz
1986	Batang Quiapo	Iska
1987	Amang Hustler	
1988	Iyo ang Batas, Akin ang Katarungan	Pinang
1988	Babaing Hampaslupa	Aling Ising
1988	Itanong Mo sa Buwan	
1990	Gumapang Ka sa Lusak	
1991	Makiusap Ka sa Diyos	Sister Carmen
1994	Pare Ko!	Auring Lorenzo
1995	Patayin sa Sindak si Barbara	Yaya Benita
1996	Maruja	Belen
1996	Cedie	Mrs. Mellon
1998	Dama de Noche	Mother Catalina
1998	Ang Babae sa Bubungang Lata	Amapola
1998	Puso ng Pasko	Lola Angeles
1999	Isusumbong Kita sa Tatay Ko...	Lola Benedicta
1999	Sa Paraiso ni Efren	
2000	Deathrow	Robbery Victim
2001	Isda	
2004	Aishite Imasu 1941: Mahal Kita	Inya
2006	You Are the One	
2007	Tambolista	
2007	Ouija	Lola Corazon
2007	A Love Story	Inang Sion
2007	Bahay Kubo: A Pinoy Mano Po!	Amelia
2008	Adela	Adela Macaraig
2008	Caregiver	Lola Miling
2009	Booking	
2009	Manila	Seniora Aleria
2009	Grandmother	Lola Sepa
2011	Presa	
2012	The Mistress	Lola Lina
2013	David F.	
2013	Nuwebe	
2013	Otso	
2013	Alamat ni China Doll	
2013	Morgue	
2014	Bride for Rent	Lola Czarina
2014	My Illegal Wife	Magda Zabaldica
2016	Mrs.	
2016	Padre de Familia	Lola Eva
2017	New Generation Heroes	
2017	Tatlong Bibe	Mameng

=== Television ===
Year	Title	Role(s)
1980–1985	Anna Liza	Munda
1987	Maricel Regal Drama Special	Aling Panchang
1992–1997	Mara Clara	Aling Pacita
1996	Bayani	Melchora Aquino
1996–1997	Mia Gracia	
1999	Marinella	Doña Beatriz
2000–2002	Pangako Sa 'Yo	Puring "Lola Puring" San Juan
2000–2001	Saan Ka Man Naroroon	Aling Tasing
2002–2003	Bituin	Rustica
2005	Mars Ravelo's Darna	Nacyfe
2005	'Til Death Do Us Part	Lola / La
2007–2008	Maging Sino Ka Man: Ang Pagbabalik	Impo
2008	Lovebooks Presents: No Boyfriend Since Birth	
2009	Tayong Dalawa	Lilian "Lola Lily" King
2011	Machete	Older Aginaya
2011–2012	Glamorosa	Lola Magda
2011–2012	Ikaw ay Pag-Ibig	Max's mother
2013	Indio	Uray
2014	Sana Bukas pa ang Kahapon	Patrice "Lola Patchi" Salvador
2014	Sa Puso ni Dok	
2015–2016	Ningning	Lola Adelina

== See also ==
- List of Filipino actresses
- Cinema of the Philippines
- Television in the Philippines

== Bibliography ==
- Nenuca Jose; Lena Pareja (1994). "Philippine Film". In Nicanor Tiongson (ed.). CCP Encyclopedia of Philippine Art. Vol. VIII (1st ed.). Manila: Cultural Center of the Philippines. p. 271. ISBN 971-8546-31-6.
