= Independencia (film) =

2009 film

- Film poster
- Directed by: Raya Martin
- Written by: Raya Martin; Ramon Sarmiento
- Produced by: Arleen C. Cuevas
- Starring: Tetchie Agbayani; Sid Lucero; Alessandra de Rossi; Mika Aguilos
- Cinematography: Jeanne Lapoirie
- Edited by: Jay Halili
- Music by: Lutgardo Labad
- Production companies: Arte France Cinéma; Cinematografica; Atopic; Razor Films; Volya Films
- Release date: May 2009
- Running time: 77 minutes
- Country: Philippines
- Language: Tagalog

Independencia is a 2009 Filipino period drama film co-written and directed by Raya Martin. Set in the Philippines during the start of the American Occupation in the early 1900s, the film revolves around three generations of a family who flees the impending conflict in the city and tries to survive in the jungle. The grainy, black and white quality, primitive editing techniques and painted backdrops evoke the mode of filmmaking pervasive during that era. It was the first Filipino film to be screened in the Un Certain Regard section at the Cannes Film Festival when it was shown at the 2009 festival.

== Plot ==
The film starts in a street scene. The people are in jovial spirits and are eager to celebrate the Philippines' newfound independence from Spain. The music and festivities then stop abruptly and they look up to the horizon. In few whispered words, the townspeople remark that "they are coming," referring to the American forces. Wary of the terror the soldiers might bring upon them, a mother (Tetchie Agbayani) decides to flee to the mountain jungles with her son (Sid Lucero). Deep in the jungle, they find an abandoned wooden hut and decide to settle there away from civilization and the perceived oppression that could come from the Americans. One day, the son finds a young woman (Alessandra de Rossi), exhausted and lying on the road after an American soldier rapes her. He tends to her, much to the reluctance of his mother. However, his mother eventually falls ill, then dies; he buries her in the middle of the forest. Afterwards, the woman gives birth to her child from the rape.

At this point, the film's narrative is interrupted. The celluloid reel is removed and replaced. This time, it is a newsreel narrated by an American broadcaster at first describing the Philippines in general, then proceeding to an event that occurred in a marketplace in an unnamed town. A young boy is shot by an American soldier, who thought he was stealing, although the vendor said that the boy was just being playful. However, the other passersby said that the boy was indeed about to commit a crime, justifying the soldier's action. The soldier then poses beside the dead body for the camera. The newsreel ends with a warning to all people who do questionable things: "Our brave troops are everywhere, ensuring that the streets are safe in this time of crisis."

The newsreel ends just as abruptly and the narrative resumes. The woman's little boy is now grown up and living very comfortably in the jungle. His makeshift family has discarded the few things that remained from their civilized life in the city. The child, not knowing about life below the mountains at all, is not afraid to roam in the jungle. He keeps telling the man and the woman of the white ghosts he sees between the trees. The man and the woman realize these are the soldiers and that it is only a matter of time before they are found. One night, while the man and the boy embark on a hunting expedition, a storm begins to rage across the jungle. It blows away their makeshift hut, killing the woman inside. The man also dies protecting the boy and keeping him dry. The boy wanders the jungle alone, until American soldiers find him. Terrified, he runs away from them, and the soldiers promptly shoot at him. The boy climbs up the mountain. His shirt slowly becomes hand-painted as he jumps off a cliff to his death. The sky in the backdrop also becomes hand-painted, first a faint yellow, to a bright orange, then finally a deep red.

== Cast ==
- Tetchie Agbayani as the mother
- Sid Lucero as the man
- Alessandra de Rossi as the woman
- Mika Aguilos as the boy

== Production ==
Raya Martin developed the film as an homage to the early Hollywood studio system, which has greatly influence Filipino cinema. He wanted to capture the feel of films shot in the early 20th century, and this involved shooting entirely inside a studio, a practice that was popular in the early days of Hollywood cinema. Since most of the film was set in the jungle, they basically had to reconstruct a jungle location indoors. Martin's production design team, headed by Digo Ricio, placed trees and plants both fake and real, and painted all of the backdrops for the scenes. Film critic Graham Fuller said that the film "harnesses the aesthetics and artifice of silent films and early talkies: their grammar, look, acting, and cinematographic tricks."

== Reception ==
Independencia was one of two films from Raya Martin that were screened as official selections at the 2009 Cannes Film Festival, and was the first Filipino film to be selected for the Un Certain Regard section of the Cannes Film Festival. He has since garnered critical acclaim in European and Asian Film circles. Film critic Antoine Thirion considered him one of the 50 best filmmakers under 50 in the 50th issue of Cinemascope: "There’s no Filipino director who can deny that he’s trying to portray the particularly tragic condition of their people. But only Martin has succeeded in advancing a contemporary image, solidly set in the present yet permanently floating between ages. The mixture of fantasy and determination, of naiveté and irony necessary (as in the exotic colonial/Hollywood pastiche of Independencia) is only his."
