= 1988 Palanca Awards =

Philippine literary award

38th Palanca Awards

The 38th Don Carlos Palanca Memorial Awards for Literature was held to commemorate the memory of Carlos Palanca through an endeavor that would promote education and culture in the country.

The 1988 winners were divided into ten categories, open only to English and Filipino [Tagalog] short story, poetry, essay, one-act play, and full-length play:

== English Division ==
=== Short Story ===
- First Prize: Eli Ang Barroso, "Our Lady of the Arts and Letters"
- Second Prize: Mario Miclat, "Antonio and His China Wall"
- Third Prize: Eric Gamalinda, "Mourning and Weeping in this Valley of Tears"

Nowell Danao, "The Perpetual Monday Morning in the Life of Jose Sakay"

=== Poetry ===
- First Prize: Merlie Alunan, "Poems for Amina"
- Second Prize: Eric Gamalinda, "Patria Y Muerte"

Ramon Sunico, "Secret of Graphite"
Edgardo B. Maranan, "Star Maps and Other Poems"

- Third Prize: Clovis Nazareno, "Horns of the World"

Benilda S. Santos, "Nude"
Elson Elizaga, "Poems for Three Friends"

=== Essay ===
- First Prize: Tezza Parel, "A Sort of Life by the Seawall"
- Second Prize: Isagani R. Cruz, "Deconstructing America: America Through the Eyes of Filipinos"
- Third Prize: Edgardo B. Maranan, "Palawan: Tales of Poverty, Poetry and Time Travel"

=== One-Act Play ===
- First Prize: Bobby Flores Villasis, "Salcedo"
- Second Prize: No Winner
- Third Prize: Elsa M. Coscolluela, "Japayukisan"

=== Full-Length Play ===
- First Prize: No Winner
- Second Prize: No Winner
- Third Prize: Mig Alvarez Enriquez, "Alin Ed Purona or Princess Urduja"
- Honorable Mention: Felix A. Clemente, "The Wedding"

Leoncio P. Deriada, "Ulahingan Rud-suan"

== Filipino Division ==
=== Maikling Kwento ===
- First Prize: Cyrus P. Borja, "Sugat sa Dagat"
- Second Prize: Dong Delos Reyes, "Ecce Homo, Ecce Machina"
- Third Prize: Ronald De Leon, "Huling Pagsusulit"

Rosario Balmaceda-Gutierrez, "Sino Man sa Atin"

=== Tula ===
- First Prize: Ariel Dim. Borlongan, "Malulungkot na Taludtod"
- Second Prize: Josephine Barrios, "Babae Akong Namumuhay Mag-isa"
- Third Prize: Romulo P. Baquiran Jr., "Mga Pangarap at Bangungot na Di Malimot"

Benilda S. Santos, "Sa Pakpak ng Balse ni Strauss"

=== Sanaysay ===
- Honorable Mention:

Isagani R. Cruz, "Ang Filipino sa Larangan ng Panitikan"
Tomas F. Agulto, "Ang Mga Badjao sa Tungkalan"
Pedro L. Ricarte, "Sa Malalim at Malayong Panahon..."
Rustica Carpio, "Talinhaga, Hinaing at Pag-ibig ng Isang Makata"

=== Dulang May Isang Yugto ===
- First Prize: Ronaldo C. Tumbokon, "Ang Bagong Libis ng Nayon"

Manuel R. Buising, "Tumbampreso"

- Second Prize: Amado Lacuesta Jr., "Abril 1521"

Catherine Calzo, "Kuwerdas"

- Third Prize: No Winner

=== Dulang Ganap ang Haba ===
- First Prize: Manuel R. Buising, "Kung Bakit May Nuno sa Punso"
- Second Prize: Malou Leviste Jacob, "Pulitika ng Buhay at Pag-ibig"
- Third Prize: Felix Padilla, "Larawan ng Pilipino Bilang Artista"

== Sources ==
- "The Don Carlos Palanca Memorial Awards for Literature | Winners 1988". Archived from the original on 2009-10-22.
