= Raya Martin =

Filipino filmmaker (born 1984)

Raya Martin (born 1984) is a Filipino filmmaker. His works include Independencia and Manila, which he codirected with Adolfo Alix, Jr. In 2013 he and Mark Peranson co-directed La última película, starring Alex Ross Perry.
