= Adela (2008 film) =

2008 film by Adolfo Alix Jr.

- Directed by: Adolfo Borinaga Alix Jr.
- Written by: Adolfo Alix Jr.; Nick Joseph Olanka
- Produced by: Maxie Evangelista III; Noel D. Ferrer
- Starring: Anita Linda; Joem Bascon; Jason Abalos; Perla Bautista; Iza Calzado; Ricky Davao
- Cinematography: Albert Banzon
- Edited by: Alex Castañeda
- Music by: Ditoy Aguila
- Production company: Bicycle Pictures
- Distributed by: Visit Films
- Release date: July 11, 2008
- Running time: 90 minutes
- Country: Philippines
- Language: Filipino

Adela is a 2008 Filipino drama independent film starring Anita Linda. The film was a tribute for the film veteran which won Best Actress awards from the Gawad Tanglaw, 10th Cinemanila International Film Festival (Southeast Asia Film Competition) and Young Critics Circle for her portrayal of the titular character.

The story of Adela, which takes place in the span of one day, is a heartbreaking story of a woman who longs for the company of her loved ones.

== Synopsis ==
On her eightieth birthday, Adela prepares enough food to accommodate her children who all promised to be present during the occasion. She goes around the community and helps those who are in need. She tries to treat it like a normal day—doing her daily chores and duties but the widow can't hide her loneliness.

Adela has three children: an OFW who works in Qatar; a drug addict son (portrayed by Ricky Davao) who is currently in jail; and a daughter who works as a housemaid in Makati. They all fail to show up and greet her, prompting her to spend the day alone in Freedom Island, a bird sanctuary where mangroves are abundant.

== Plot ==
On her way home, Mercy (Angeli Bayani), heavily pregnant discovered her live-in partner PJ (Jason Abalos), is sleeping with her mistress (Cyra de la Cerna). To her dismay, she accidentally labored with the help of Aling Adela (Anita Linda), a former midwife. Celebrating her 80th birthday, Adela expects her children to come along with her grand children. On the other hand, PJ with the baranggay captain invited Aling Adela for a gathering to celebrate the birth of his baby and at the same time convince her to join the prayer rally for President Arroyo but in excuse she wants to have her day with her children. As she prepares to go to church, Benjo (Joem Bascon) came to sell a toaster and a cellphone charger. She then discovered her wedding ring was gone then went to a junk shop manager and found out that the appliances she bought are all stolen from Aling Glenda (Perla Bautista). She confronted the young snatcher and pleaded for her ring back but he won’t simply admit it. She simply went to church to pray and give thanks for this special day but she then saw the young snatchers activities. She also met her former co-league in the radio. There were chit-chats and Adela refuses to discuss how lonely her life is. Near the church, she also bought toys and decorations for her apos. She went also to the local prison to visit her son only to find out that her son is about to be convicted and be transferred in the Muntinglupa. She then decided to attend the PJ’s celebration with all the drinking and karaoke singing. While all the gang is singing “Luha”, she got a call from her daughter. It is unclear but based on the reaction of Adela, her daughter won’t be able to come. She went home, gave some pancit to her neighbour. She also went to the young snatcher’s mother and gave the appliance back only to discover an illicit love affair with a stud. As everyone went to the prayer rally, Adela silently went to the river shore and celebrated 80th birthday with an uncertain hope and much pain. The film ended with a disturbing scene where Adela went to a bush place and leaves the audience hanging what happened.

== Cast ==
- Anita Linda as Adela Macaraig
- Joem Bascon as Benjo
- Jason Abalos as PJ
- Angeli Bayani as Mercy
- Perla Bautista as Glenda
- Ricky Davao as Felipe Macaraig
- German Moreno as Himself
- Kenneth Ocampo as Joy
- Arnold Reyes as Jericho
- Zyra dela Cerna as PJ's mistress
- Iza Calzado as Tina
- Joy Napoles as Jona
- Armando Reyes as Larry

== Release ==
Adolfo Alix Jr.'s Adela was the opening film of the Cinemalaya Philippine Independent Film Festival held at the Cultural Center of the Philippines on July 20, 2008.

Adolfo Alix Jr. Adela was also shown in the World Cinema Section of the 2008 Toronto International Film Festival.

== Accolades ==
Year	Nominee / work	Award	Result
2009	International Film Festival Rotterdam	Film Presented	Nominated
2009	Vladivostok International Film Festival	Official Selection	Nominated
2009	Melbourne International Film Festival	Official Selection	Nominated
2009	Moscow International Film Festival	Official Selection	Nominated
2009	Sarasota Film Festival	Narrative Competition	Nominated
2009	San Francisco Asian-American Film Festival	Official Selection International Showcase Competition	Nominated
2009	Young Critics Circle Awards	Best Actress for Anita Linda	Won
2009	Young Critics Circle Awards	Best Picture	Won
2009	Young Critics Circle Awards	Best Performance	Won
2009	Young Critics Circle Awards	Best Screenplay	Won
2009	Young Critics Circle Awards	Best Cinematography and Visual Design	Won
2009	Young Critics Circle Awards	Best Editing	Won
2009	Young Critics Circle Awards	Best Sound and Aural Orchestration	Won
2008	2008 Toronto International Film Festival	Official Selection Contemporary World Cinema	Nominated
2008	Cinemanila International Film Festival	Best Actress for Anita Linda	Won
2008	Pusan International Film Festival	Official Selection Window to Asian Cinema	Nominated
2008	Cinemalaya Independent Film Festival	Opening Film	Nominated
