= Sta. Niña =

- Theatrical movie poster
- Directed by: Emmanuel Quindo Palo
- Screenplay by: Liza Magtoto; Emmanuel Quindo Palo
- Story by: Emmanuel Quindo Palo
- Produced by: Rodel Nacianceno; Emmanuel Quindo Palo; Susan V. Tagle
- Starring: Coco Martin; Alessandra de Rossi; Anita Linda; Angel Aquino; Irma Adlawan; Nanding Josef
- Cinematography: Nor Domingo; RI Lim
- Edited by: Chrisel Galeno-Desuasido; Tara Illenberger
- Music by: Mike Albert Idioma; Dean Rosen
- Production companies: Cinemalaya; CCM Creatives
- Distributed by: Star Cinema; Cinemalaya Foundation
- Release date: September 26, 2012 (Philippines)
- Running time: 105 minutes
- Country: Philippines
- Languages: Filipino; English

Sta. Niña (Saint Niña) is a 2012 Filipino drama film directed by Emmanuel Quindo Palo. The film is Palo's first directorial venture. The film tells the story of Paulino who unexpectedly unearths the remains of his 2-year-old daughter in a lahar-filled quarry. It was one of the official entries for the New Breed Full Length Feature Category in Cinemalaya 2012.

== Synopsis ==
Years after volcanic mud flow covered a town in Pampanga, Pol and his co-workers dig up the coffin of his daughter. The remains of two-year-old Marikit did not show any signs of decay. Many consider this a miracle and people troop to Pol's home to be healed by Marikit. As people are getting healed purportedly by the dead child, Pol insists that his child is worthy of being called a saint. Thus begins his crusade to get his daughter beatified. Unearthing her body digs up unresolved issues in many persons' lives. In the end, an event will make us ask if there was healing, a cleansing of sins and a chance to move on.

== Cast ==
- Coco Martin as Paulino 'Pol' Mungcal
- Alessandra de Rossi as Madeleine 'Madel' Mabanglo Mungcal
- Anita Linda as Benigna 'Bining' Mungcal
- Angel Aquino as Sister Josefa
- Irma Adlawan as Cora Mabanglo
- Nanding Josef as Fr. Mallari
- Joe Gruta as Gov. Servando Magat
- Lui Manansala as Mrs. Carmen Magat
- Leo Martinez as Obispo
- Rie Batingana as Melchor/Zora
- Bea Garcia as Gia Pangan
- Patricia Ismael as Malou
- Rhian Venice Gomez as Daughter of Pol
- Dax Alejandro as Abel
- Allan Guanlao as Ben
- Rhian Venice Gomez as Daughter of Paulino
- Jobert Luzares as Sonny
- Adrian Sebastian as Joel
- Kristine Pearl Lagman as Gemma
- Mary Joyce Lopez as Joy

== Awards ==
36th Gawad Urian Awards

- Pinakamahusay na Pangalawang Aktres: Alessandra de Rossi

2013 Golden Screen Awards

- Best Actress in a Supporting Role: Anita Linda

2013 1st ASEAN International Film Festival and Awards

- Best Picture for Drama
- Best Director: Emmanuel Quindo Palo
- Best Actress: Alessandra de Rossi
- Best Supporting Actress: Anita Linda

2012 17th International Film Festival of Kerala

- The Golden Crow Pheasant Award for Best Feature Film a.k.a. Suvarna Chakoram

2012 Cinemalaya Philippine Independent Film Festival

- Best Supporting Actress: Anita Linda
