= Bing Lao =

Filipino writer, producer and director (1948–2024)

- Born: Armando Yasin Lao; September 6, 1948; Davao City, Philippines
- Died: June 18, 2024 (aged 75); Quezon City, Philippines
- Occupations: Screenwriter; producer; director; editor; professor
- Years active: 1984–2023
- Known for: Takaw Tukso; Itanong Mo sa Buwan; La Vida Rosa; Tuhog; Serbis; Kinatay
- Awards: Order of National Artists of the Philippines (2026)

Armando "Bing" Lao (September 6, 1948 – June 18, 2024) was a Filipino screenwriter and film director best known for writing the screenplay for films such as Brillante Mendoza's Kinatay, Jeffrey Jeturian's Kubrador and Pila Balde, and Chito S. Roño's Suntok sa Buwan.

Lao also founded the Philippines' influential "Found Story Screenwriting Workshop".

== Death and legacy ==
Lao died at the Philippine Heart Center in Quezon City, on June 18, 2024, at the age of 75. In 2026, Lao was posthumously recognized as a National Artist of the Philippines for Film and Broadcast Arts following the issuance of Proclamation No. 1414 by president Bongbong Marcos.

== Filmography ==
=== Screenwriter ===
- Chikas (1984) - Story and screenplay
- Mahilig (1984) - Story and screenplay
- Takaw Tukso (1986) - Story and screenplay
- Di Maghilom ang Sugat (1986) - Story and screenplay
- Hubad na Pangarap (1987)
- Saan Nagtatago ang Pag-ibig (1987)
- Stupid Cupid (1988)
- Hati Tayo sa Magdamag (1988)
- Itanong Mo sa Buwan (1988) - Story and screenplay
- Dear Diary (1989) - Story and screenplay
- Oras-oras Araw-araw (1990)
- Bakit Ikaw Pa Rin (1990) - Story and screenplay
- Tayo na sa Dilim (1990)
- Sana Pag-ibig Na (1998) - Story and screenplay
- Fetch a Pail of Water (1999) - Story and screenplay
  - Best Film in Bogota Film Festival
  - Independent Theatrical Feature Film in WorldFest Houston International Film Festival
- Larger than Life (2001) - Story and screenplay
- La Vida Rosa (2001) - Story and screenplay
- Bridal Shower (2004)
- Minsan Pa (2004) - Story and screenplay
- Kubrador (2006) - screen play supervision
- Service (2008) - (shared with Boots Agbayani Pastor)
  - Golden Kinnaree Award in Bangkok International Film Festival
- Butchered (2009) - Story and screenplay
  - nominated for Palm d'Or at Cannes Film Festival
  - nominated for Best Film at Sitges Catalonian International Film Festival
- Biyaheng Lupa (2009) - Story and screenplay
- The Strangers (2012)
- Dukit (2013) - (shared with Honelyn Joy Alipio)
- Those Long-haired Nights (2017)
- The Monkey and the Turtle (2023)

=== Director ===
- Biyaheng Lupa (2009)
- Ag Ignorantiam (2012)
- Dukit (2013)
- Red (2024) - Assistant Director

=== Producer ===
- Biyaheng Lupa (2009)
- Here comes the Bride (2010)
- Trespassers (2011)
- Shackled (2012)

=== Editor ===
- Gensan Punch (2021) - shared with Ysballe Denoga and Peter Arian Vito
- The Monkey and the Turtle (2023)

=== Actor ===
- Service (2008)
- Biyaheng Lupa (2009)
- Six Degrees of Separation from Lilia Cuntapay (2011)

== Accolades ==
Award-giving Body	Year	Nominated work	Category	Result
Cinemalaya Independent Film Festival	2009	Biyaheng Lupa	Digital Local - Grand Jury Prize	Won
Cinemalaya Independent Film Festival	2009	Biyaheng Lupa	Digital Lokal - Lino Brocka Award	Nominated
FAMAS Award	1989	Hati Tayo sa Magdamag	Best Screenplay	Won
FAMAS Award	2010	Butchered	Best Screenplay	Nominated
Gawad Urian Awards	1987	Takaw Tukso	Best Screenplay	Won
Gawad Urian Awards	1989	Itanong Mo sa Buwan	Best Screenplay	Won
Gawad Urian Awards	1999	Sana Pag-ibig na	Best Screenplay	Nominated
Gawad Urian Awards	2000	Fetch a Pail of Water	Best Screenplay	Won
Gawad Urian Awards	2001	Larger than Life	Best Screenplay	Won
Gawad Urian Awards	2002	La Vida Rosa	Best Screenplay	Won
Gawad Urian Awards	2009	Service	Best Screenplay (shared with Boots Agbayani Pastor)	Nominated
Gawad Urian Awards	2010	Butchered	Best Screenplay	Nominated
Gawad Urian Awards	2010	Bihayenng Lupa	Best Screenplay	Nominated
Gawad Urian Awards	2013	Shackled	Best Picture (shared with Joji Alonso and John Victor Tence)	Nominated
Gawad Urian Awards	2014	Dukit	Best Picture	Nominated
Gawad Urian Awards	2014	Dukit	Best Director	Nominated
Gawad Urian Awards	2014	Dukit	Best Screenplay (shared with Honelyn Joy Alipio)	Nominated
Gawad Urian Awards	2014	Dukit	Best Music	Nominated
Gawad Urian Awards	2014	Dukit	Best Sound	Nominated
Gawad Urian Awards	2022	Gensan Punch	Best Editing (shared with Ysballe Denoga and Peter Arian Vito)	Nominated
Golden Screen Movie Awards	2005	Minsan Pa	Best Screenplay	Won
Golden Screen Movie Awards	2005	Minsan Pa	Best Original Song	Won
Golden Screen Movie Awards	2010	Butchered	Best Screenplay	Nominated
Luna Awards (FAP)	1990	Oras-oras, Araw-araw	Best Story Adaptation	Won
Luna Awards (FAP)	1999	Sana Pagibig na	Best Screenplay	Nominated
Luna Awards (FAP)	2024	—N/a	Lamberto Avellana Memorial Award	Won
Metro Manila Film Festival	2013	Dukit	New Wave Best Feature Film	Won
Metro Manila Film Festival	2013	Dukit	New Wave Best Director	Won
PMPC Star Awards for Movies	2023	Gensan Punch	Indie Movie Editor of the Year (shared with Peter Arian Vito and Ysballe Denoga)	Won
Young Critics Circle	1999	Fetch a Pail of Water	Best Screenplay	Nominated
Young Critics Circle	1999	Sana Pagibig na	Best Screenplay	Nominated
Young Critics Circle	2004	Minsan Pa	Best Screenplay	Won
Young Critics Circle	2008	Service	Best Screenplay	Nominated
Young Critics Circle	2009	Biyaheng Lupa	Best Film	Nominated
Young Critics Circle	2009	Biyaheng Lupa	Best Screenplay	Won
