= Grandmother (2009 film) =

2009 Filipino film

- Directed by: Brillante Ma. Mendoza
- Screenplay by: Linda Casimiro
- Produced by: Didier Costet
- Starring: Anita Linda; Rustica Carpio
- Cinematography: Odyssey Flores
- Edited by: Kats Serraon
- Music by: Teresa Barrozo
- Production companies: Swift Productions; Centerstage Productions Philippines
- Distributed by: trigon-film; Équation Distribution; Alambique Destilaria de Ideias Unipessoal; Film1 Sundance Channel
- Release date: September 7, 2009 (Venice Film Festival)
- Running time: 110 minutes
- Countries: Philippines; France
- Languages: Filipino; French; Tagalog

Grandmother (also known as Lola) is a 2009 Filipino-French independent drama film directed by Brillante Mendoza. It was entered into the main competition at the 66th edition of the Venice Film Festival.

== Plot ==
Two elderly women bear the consequences of a crime involving their respective grandsons. One is the victim, the other is the suspect. Both weak and poor, they laboriously solicit money in the midst of a storm, one for the victim's burial, the other for the suspect's bail bond.

== Cast ==
- Anita Linda as Lola Sepa
- Rustica Carpio as Lola Puring
- Tanya Gomez as Ditas
- Jhong Hilario as Bebong
- Ketchup Eusebio as Mateo
- Benjie Filomeno as Domeng
- Bobby Jerome Go as Jay Jay
- Geraldine Villamil as Virgie
- Nico Nullan as Nico
- Hope Matriano as Linda
