= Brillante Mendoza =

Filipino independent filmmaker

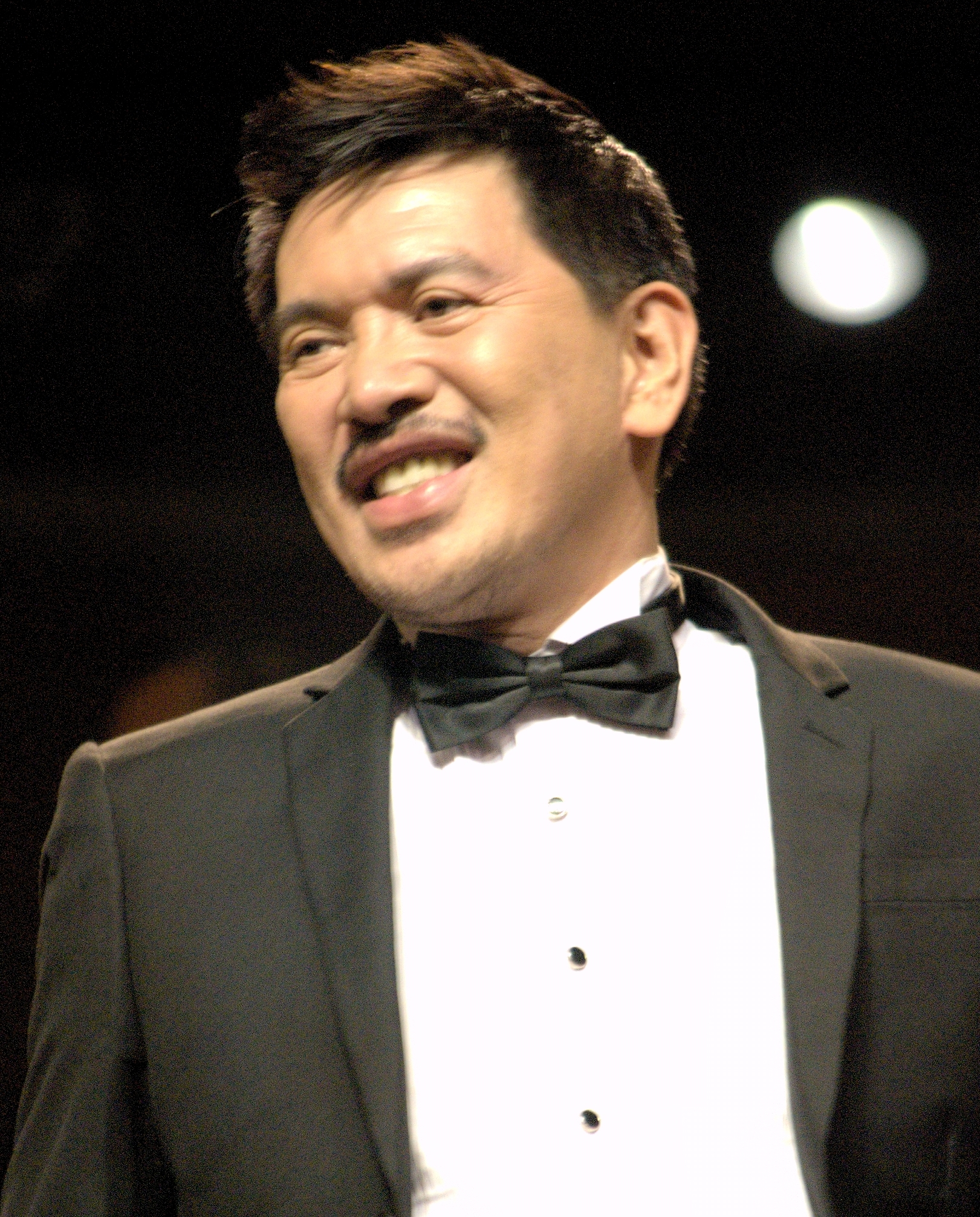
- Mendoza at the 69th Venice International Film Festival in September 2012
- Born: July 30, 1960 (age 66); San Fernando, Pampanga, Philippines
- Education: University of Santo Tomas
- Occupation: Film director
- Years active: 1990s–present

Brillante Mendoza (Tagalog: [brɪlˈjantɛ mɛnˈdɔsɐ]; born July 30, 1960), also known as Dante Mendoza, is a Filipino independent filmmaker. Mendoza is known one of the key members associated with the Philippine New Wave.

== Career ==
Mendoza was born and raised in San Fernando, Pampanga. He took advertising arts of the College of Architecture and fine arts at the University of Santo Tomas.

Mendoza has directed sixteen films since 2005, also he credited some cinematographer and production designer under his alias. His first collaborated with actor Coco Martin in seven films: Masahista, Kaleldo, Foster Child, Tirador, Serbis, Kinatay, and Captive.

Mendoza directed the first and second State of the Nation Addresses of President Rodrigo Duterte in 2016 and 2017, respectively.

== Filmography ==
Year	Title	Original title	Credited as				Notes
Year	Title	Original title	Director	Producer	Screenwriter	Production designer	Notes
1985	Virgin Forest		No	No	No	Yes	
1986	Takaw Tukso		No	No	No	Yes	
1986	Private Show		No	No	No	Yes	
1986	Di Maghilom ang Sugat		No	No	No	Yes	
1986	Materyales Fuertes		No	No	No	Yes	
1986	Magic of the Universe	Salamangkero	No	No	No	Yes	With Arthur Nicdao
1987	Mga Lihim ng Kalapati		No	No	No	Yes	
1989	Si Baleleng at ang Gintong Sirena		No	No	No	Yes	
1989	Gabriela		No	No	No	Yes	
1989	Valentina		No	No	No	Yes	
1989	Target... Police General (Maj. Gen. Alfredo S. Lim Story)		No	No	No	Yes	
1990	"Ako ang Batas" -Gen. Tomas Karingal		No	No	No	Yes	
1990	Mula Paa Hanggang Ulo		No	No	No	Yes	
1990	Kristobal: Tinik sa Corona		No	No	No	Yes	
1990	Iisa-isahin Ko Kayo!		No	No	No	Yes	
2005	The Masseur	Masahista	Yes		Story		
2006	Summer Heat	Kaleldo	Yes	Yes	Story		
2006	The Teacher	Manoro	Yes			Yes	Also as cinematographer
2007	Fantasy	Pantasya	Yes				Also cinematographer
2007	Foster Child		Yes				
2007	Slingshot	Tirador	Yes				Also as cinematographer
2008	Service	Serbis	Yes				
2009	Butchered (The Execution of P)	Kinatay	Yes			Yes	
2009	Grandmother	Lola	Yes	No	No	Yes	
2012	Captive		Yes	Yes	Yes	No	
2012	Thy Womb	Sinapupunan	Yes	Executive	No	Yes	
2013	Sapi	Sapi	Yes	Executive	No	Yes	Also as cinematographer
2015	Trap	Taklub	Yes	No	No	Yes	
2016	Ma' Rosa	Ma' Rosa	Yes	Executive	No	Yes	
2016	Asian Three-Fold Mirror 2016: Reflections	Asia sanmenkyô	Yes				Segment: "Shinauma"
2018	Alpha: The Right to Kill		Yes	Executive		Yes	
2018	Journey	Lakbayan	Yes	Yes			Segment: "Desfocado"; Co-director with Lav Diaz and Kidlat Tahimik
2018	Amo (TV mini-series)		Yes				TV mini-series, distributed by Netflix (international)
2019	Mindanao	Mindanao	Yes	Yes	Story	Yes	
2019	Verdict		No	Yes	No	No	Also creative consultant
2021	Gensan Punch		Yes	Yes	No	Yes	
2022	Resbak		Yes	Yes	No	Yes	
2022	Apag		Yes	Executive	No	Yes	Summer Metro Manila Film Festival Entry
2024	Pula	Pola	Yes	Executive	Story	No	Premiered on Netflix
2024	Motherland		Yes	No	No	Yes	
2026	Until She Remembers		Yes	No	Yes	No	

== Awards and nominations ==
Mendoza is the first Filipino filmmaker to receive the Best Director award for his film Kinatay at the 62nd Cannes Film Festival. His 2009 film Lola won the award for Best Film at the 6th Dubai International Film Festival.

Mendoza's 2012 film Captive was shown in competition at the 62nd Berlin International Film Festival in February 2012. His 2012 film Thy Womb competed for the Golden Lion at the 69th Venice International Film Festival and earned Mendoza the award for Achievement in Directing at the Asia Pacific Screen Awards in 2012.

Mendoza's film Taklub was selected to be screened in the Un Certain Regard section at the 2015 Cannes Film Festival.

Mendoza is one of the few people and is the only Filipino filmmaker to be nominated in all three major prizes from "The Big Three" (Cannes, Berlin, Venice).

Year	Film	Film festival	Category	Result	Refs.
1987	Salamangkero	3rd PMPC Star Awards for Movies	Best Production Design	Won	
1987	Private Show	5th Film Academy of the Philippines Awards	Best Production Design	Nominated	
1987	Takaw Tukso	11th Gawad Urian Awards	Best Production Design	Won	
1987	Private Show	11th Gawad Urian Awards	Best Production Design	Nominated	
2008	Service	2008 Cannes Film Festival	Palme d'Or	Nominated	
2009	Kinatay	2009 Cannes Film Festival	Palme d'Or	Nominated	
2009	Kinatay	2009 Cannes Film Festival	Best Director	Won	
2009	Grandmother	66th Venice International Film Festival	Golden Lion	Nominated	
2012	Captive	62nd Berlin International Film Festival	Golden Bear	Nominated	
2012	Thy Womb	69th Venice International Film Festival	Golden Lion	Nominated	
2016	Ma' Rosa	2016 Cannes Film Festival	Palme d'Or	Nominated	
2021	Gensan Punch	26th Busan International Film Festival	Kim Jiseok Award	Won	
