= 13th Busan International Film Festival =

2008 edition of film festival

13th Pusan International Film Festival
- Opening film: The Gift to Stalin
- Closing film: I Am Happy
- Location: Busan, South Korea
- Film titles: 315
- Festival date: October 2–10, 2008
- Website: http://www.biff.kr

Busan International Film Festival
- 14th 12th

The 13th Pusan International Film Festival took place on October 2 to 10, 2008 in Busan, South Korea. A total of 315 films from 60 countries were screened at the festival.

The event opened with The Gift to Stalin by Kazakh director Rustem Abdrashev. South Korean Yoon Jong-chan's I Am Happy closed the festival. The event held 827 screenings and was attended by 198,818 people.

== Juries ==
=== New Currents ===
- Anna Karina, Danish-French actress, Head Juror
- Samira Makhmalbaf, Iranian director
- Santosh Sivan, Indian director
- Lee Hwa-si, South Korean actress
- Karl Baumgartner, German film producer

=== BIFF Mecenat Award ===
- Ahn Jung-sook, former director of Korean Film Council
- Jean-Pierre Rehm, head of Marseille Festival of Documentary Film
- Zhang Xian-min, Chinese film professor

=== Sonje Award ===
- Kim-Jho Gwangsoo, Korean film producer
- Roger Gonin, French director
- Calida Uabumrungjit, Thai project director

=== NETPAC Award ===
- Mohamed Atebbai, Iranian film critic
- Jeannette Paulson Hereniko, former Hawaii International Film Festival director
- Edward Delos Santos Cabagnot, programmer of Cinemalaya Philippine Independent Film Festival

=== FIPRESCI Award ===
- Elise Domenach, French film critic
- Hynek Pallas, Swedish film critic
- Dubravka Lakić, Serbian film critic
- Bitopan Borborah Rinju, Indian film critic
- Shin Kang-ho, South Korean film critic

== Official selection ==
=== Opening and closing films ===
Title	Director(s)	Production countrie(s)
I Am Happy (closing film)	Yoon Jong-chan	South Korea
The Gift to Stalin (opening film)	Rustem Abdrashov	Russia, Kazakhstan, Israel, Poland

=== Gala Presentation ===
Title	Director(s)	Production countrie(s)
Ashes of Time (Redux)	Wong Kar-wai	Hong Kong, China
Dada's Dance	Zhang Yuan	China
Make Yourself at Home	Soopum Sohn	United States, South Korea

=== A Window on Asian Cinema ===
Title	Director(s)	Production countrie(s)
12 Lotus	Royston Tan	Singapore
Adela	Adolfo Alix Jr.	Philippines
All Around Us	Ryōsuke Hashiguchi	Japan
Among the Clouds	Rouhollah Hejazi	Iran
Baby Angelo	Joel Ruiz	Philippines
Be Calm and Count to Seven	Ramtin Lavati	Iran
Cape No. 7	Wei Te-sheng	Taiwan
Captain Abu Raed	Amin Matalqa	Jordan
Child by Children	Kôji Hagiuda	Japan
Confessional	Jerrold Tarog, Ruel Dahis Antipuesto	Philippines
The Convert	Yasmin Ahmad	Malaysia
Departures	Yojiro Takita	Japan
Feast of Villains	Jianlin Pan	China
Fiksi.	Mouly Surya	Indonesia
Firaaq	Nandita Das	India
Flowers of the Sky	Prasanna Vithanage	Sri Lanka, India
Gou-Gou, the Cat	Isshin Inudo	Japan, South Korea
Jay	Francis Xavier Pasion	Philippines
Jermal	Ravi Bharwani	Netherlands, Indonesia, Germany, Switzerland
Kanchivaram	Priyadarshan	India
Lonely Tunes of Tehran	Saman Salur	Iran
Miao Miao	Cheng Hsiao-Tse	Taiwan
The Moon at the Bottom of the Well	Vinh Son Nguyen	Vietnam
My Darling of the Mountains	Katsuhito Ishii	Japan
My Magic	Eric Khoo	Singapore
Native Dancer	Gulshat Omarova	Kazakhstan, Russia
Orz Boyz!	Yang Ya-che	Taiwan
Parking	Chung Mong-hong	Taiwan
Perfect Life	Emily Tang	Hong Kong
Pesantren (3 Wishes, 3 Loves)	Nurman Hakim	Indonesia
Plastic City	Nelson Yu Lik-wai	Hong Kong, Japan, Brazil, France
Ramchand Pakistani	Mehreen Jabbar	Pakistan, United States
River People	He Jianjun	China
Sell Out!	Joon-han Yeo	Malaysia
Service	Brillante Mendoza	France, Philippines
The Shaft	Zhang Chi	China
Snakes and Earrings	Yukio Ninagawa	Japan
The Song of Sparrows	Majid Majidi	Iran
Songs from the Southern Seas	Marat Sarulu	Kazakhstan, France, Germany, Russia
Soul of a Demon	Chang Tso-chi	Taiwan
Sparrow	Johnnie To	Hong Kong, China
Still Walking	Hirokazu Kore-eda	Japan
Tahaan	Santosh Sivan	India
This Longing	Azharr Rudin	Malaysia
Together with My Father	Danyar Salamat	Kazakhstan
Trivial Matters	Pang Ho-cheung	Hong Kong, China
Twilight Dancing	Tian Gao, Joshua Tong	China
Two-legged Horse	Samira Makhmalbaf	Iran
Winds of September	Tom Lin	Hong Kong, China, Taiwan
The Yurt	Ayub Shakhobitdinov	Uzbekistan

=== New Currents ===
Title	Director(s)	Production countrie(s)
100	Chris Martinez	Philippines
Blind Pig Who Wants to Fly	Edwin	Indonesia
Empty Chair	Saman Estereki	Iran
Er Dong	Jin Yang	China
Jalainur	Zhao Ye	China
Land of Scarecrows	Roh Gyeong-tae	South Korea, France
A Light in the Fog	Panahbarkhoda Rezaee	Iran
Members of the Funeral	Baek Seung-bin	South Korea
A Moment in June	O. Nathapon	Thailand
Naked of Defenses	Masahide Ichii	Japan
Ocean of an Old Man	Rajesh Shera	India
The Pot	Kim Taegon	South Korea
Routine Holiday	Li Hongqi	China
Turmoil	Kanymbek Kassymbekov, Sabit Kurmanbekov	Kazakhstan

=== Korean Cinema Today ===
Title	Director(s)
Breathless	Yang Ik-june
The Chaser	Na Hong-jin
Crush and Blush	Lee Kyoung-mi
Evil Spirit	Park Jin-sung
Exhausted	Kim Gok
Forever the Moment	Yim Soon-rye
The Good, the Bad, the Weird	Kim Jee-woon
Heartbreak Library	Kim Jung-kwon
Himalaya, Where the Wind Dwells	Jeon Soo-il
How to Live on Earth	Ahn Seul-gi
Let the Blue River Run	Kang Mi-ja
A Man Who Was Superman	Jeong Yoon-cheol
Night and Day	Hong Sang-soo
Oishii Man	Kim Jeong-jung
The Pit and the Pendulum	Sohn Young-sung
Public Enemy Returns	Kang Woo-suk
The Room Nearby	Goh Tae-jeong
Sisters on the Road	Boo Ji-young
Sunny	Lee Joon-ik
Treeless Mountain	So Yong Kim

=== Korean Cinema Retrospective ===
Title	Director(s)	Year
Ban Geum-ryeon	Kim Ki-young	1982
A Dream of Fortune	Han Hyeong-mo	1961
A Female Boss	Han Hyeong-mo	1959
The Hand of Destiny	Han Hyeong-mo	1954
The Housemaid	Kim Ki-young	1960
Hyperbolae of Youth	Han Hyeong-mo	1957
Love to Death	Han Hyeong-mo	1957
Madame Freedom	Han Hyeong-mo	1956
My Sister Is a Hussy	Han Hyeong-mo	1961

=== World Cinema ===
Title	Director(s)	Production countrie(s)
$9.99	Tatia Rosenthal	Israel, Australia
The 27 Club	Erica Dunton	United States
33 Scenes from Life	Małgorzata Szumowska	Poland, Germany
35 Shots of Rum	Claire Denis	France, Germany
Adoration	Atom Egoyan	Canada
Another Man	Lionel Baier	Switzerland
Awaking from a Dream	Freddy Mas Franqueza	Spain, Poland
Be Good	Juliette Garcias	France, Denmark
Cherry Blossoms	Doris Dörrie	Germany
A Christmas Tale	Arnaud Desplechin	France
The Collectress	Kristina Buožytė	Lithuania
Dawn of the World	Abbas Fahdel	France, Germany
Dean Spanley	Toa Fraser	New Zealand, United Kingdom
Delta	Kornél Mundruczó	Hungary, Germany
The Desert Within	Rodrigo Plá	Mexico
Dim Sum Funeral	Anna Chi	United States, Canada
Disgrace	Steve Jacobs	Australia, South Africa
Everlasting Moments	Jan Troell	Sweden, Denmark, Finland, Norway
For a Moment, Freedom	Arash Riahi	Austria, France
Four Ages of Love	Sergey Mokritskiy	Russia
Française	Souad El-Bouhati	France, Morocco
Frontier of the Dawn	Philippe Garrel	France
Frozen River	Courtney Hunt	United States
God's Offices	Claire Simon	France, Belgium
The Good Life	Andrés Wood	Chile, Spain
The Good News	Helena Taberna	Spain
Happy-Go-Lucky	Mike Leigh	United Kingdom
Helen	Christine Molloy, Joe Lawlor	Ireland, United Kingdom
Il divo	Paolo Sorrentino	Italy, France
Involuntary	Ruben Östlund	Sweden
Jerichow	Christian Petzold	Germany
Johnny Mad Dog	Jean-Stéphane Sauvaire	France
Un Lac	Philippe Grandrieux	France
Lake Mungo	Joel Anderson	Australia
Lion's Den	Pablo Trapero	Argentina, South Korea
Liverpool	Lisandro Alonso	Argentina, Netherlands, France, Spain, Germany
Lorna's Silence	Jean Pierre-Dardenne, Luc Dardenne	Belgium, France, Italy
Lost Song	Rodrigue Jean	Canada
Maybe God Is Ill	Franco Brogi Taviani	Italy
Mommy Is at the Hairdresser's	Léa Pool	Canada
Mothers & Daughters	Carl Bessai	Canada
Mr. Kuka's Advice	Dariusz Gajewski	Poland, Austria
Night Owls	Michaela Pavlátová	Czech Republic
No One's Son	Arsen Anton Ostojić	Croatia
Nucingen House	Raúl Ruiz	France, Chile
O' Horten	Bent Hamer	Norway, Germany
Of Time and the City	Terence Davies	United Kingdom
Pandora's Box	Yeşim Ustaoğlu	Turkey, Belgium, France, Germany
A Perfect Day	Ferzan Özpetek	Italy
Rembrandt's J'Accuse	Peter Greenaway	Netherlands
The Return of the Prodigal Son	Arsen Azatyan, Nariné Mkrtchyan	Armenia
Revanche	Götz Spielmann	Austria
Sandrine in the Rain	Tonino Zangardi	Italy, Germany
Scratch	Michał Rosa	Poland
The Seven Days	Ronit Elkabetz, Shlomi Elkabetz	Israel, France
Shadows in the Sun	David Rocksavage	United Kingdom
Story of Jen	François Rotger	France, Canada
The Stranger in Me	Emily Atef	Germany
Three Monkeys	Nuri Bilge Ceylan	Turkey, France, Italy
Three Wise Men	Mika Kaurismäki	Finland
The Tour	Goran Marković	Serbia, Bosnia and Herzegovina
Triomf	Michael Raeburn	South Africa, France
The Vanished Empire	Karen Shakhnazarov	Russia
Vegas: Based on a True Story	Amir Naderi	United States
Victoria	Anna Karina	Canada
Welcome Home	Jean-Xavier de Lestrade	France
Wendy and Lucy	Kelly Reichardt	United States

== Awards ==
- New Currents Award: Land of Scarecrows by Roh Gyeong-tae (South Korea/France) and Naked of Defenses by Masahide Ichii (Japan)
  - Special Mention: Members of the Funeral by Baek Seung-bin (South Korea) and Er Dong by Jin Yang (China)
- BIFF Mecenat Award: Mental by Soda Kazuhiro (Japan/United States) and Old Partner by Lee Chung-ryoul (South Korea)
- Sonje Award: Andong by Rommel Tolentino (Philippines) and Girl by Hong Sung-hoon (South Korea)
- NETPAC Award: Members of the Funeral by Baek Seung-bin (South Korea) and Treeless Mountain by So Yong Kim (United States/South Korea)
- FIPRESCI Award: Jalainur by Zhao Ye (China)
- KNN Award: 100 by Chris Martinez (Philippines)
- The Asian Filmmaker of the Year: Gulnara Sarsenova
- Korean Cinema Award: Richard Peña
