= 27th PMPC Star Awards for Movies =

2010 Philippine Movie Press Club awards

27th Star Awards for Movies
- Date: June 17, 2011
- Site: New Performing Arts Theater of Resorts World Hotel Manila, Pasay City
- Hosted by: Jericho Rosales; Toni Gonzaga

Highlights
- Best Picture: Ang Tanging Ina Mo: Last Na 'To! Sigwa (Indie)

Television coverage
- Network: ABS-CBN

The 27th PMPC Star Awards for Movies by the Philippine Movie Press Club (PMPC), honored the best Filipino films of 2010. The ceremony took place on June 17, 2011, in New Performing Arts Theater, Resorts World Hotel, Manila in Pasay City.

The PMPC Star Awards for Movies was hosted by Jericho Rosales and Toni Gonzaga. Ang Tanging Ina Mo, Last Na 'To won top awards of the night including Movie of the Year, Movie Director of the Year and Movie Actress of the Year, while Sigwa won Digital Movie of the Year and Digital Movie Director of the Year.

== Winners and nominees ==
The following are the nominations for the 27th PMPC Star Awards for Movies, covering films released in 2010.

Winners are listed first and indicated in bold.

=== Major categories ===
Movie of the Year	Digital Movie of the Year
Winner: **Ang Tanging Ina Mo, Last Na 'To** – Star Cinema: Emir – Film Development Council of the Philippines; Here Comes The Bride – Star Cinema, Quantum Films and Octo Arts Films; Rosario – Cinemabuhay International and Studio 5; Sa 'Yo Lamang – Star Cinema; Shake, Rattle and Roll 12 (Punerarya Episode) – Regal Entertainment, Inc.	Winner: **Sigwa** – Beginnings Twenty Plus Production, Sineng Totoo Production and Star Express: Donor – Spark Films; Mayohan – Cinemalaya Foundation Inc. and Alpha Dog Productions; Muli – MJM Productions; Senior Year – Digitank Studios and Metric Films; Tarima – Bluegold ProductionsThe Red Shoes – Unitel Productions and Unico Entertainment
Movie Director of the Year	Digital Movie Director of the Year
Winner: **Wenn Deramas** – **Ang Tanging Ina Mo, Last Na 'To** – Star Cinema: Laurice Guillen – Sa 'Yo Lamang – Star Cinema; Alberto Martinez – Rosario – Cinemabuhay International and Studio 5; Chris Martinez – Here Comes The Bride – Star Cinema, Quantum Films and Octo Arts Films; Chito S. Roño – Emir – Film Development Council of the Philippines; Jerrold Tarrog – Shake, Rattle and Roll 12 (Punerarya Episode) – Regal Entertainment, Inc.	Winner: **Joel Lamangan** – **Sigwa** – Beginnings Twenty Plus Production, Sineng Totoo Production and Star Express: Adolfo Alix Jr. – Muli – MJM Productions; Mark Meily – Donor – Spark Films; Dan Villegas – Mayohan – Cinemalaya Foundation Inc and Alpha Dog Productions; Neal Tan – Tarima – Bluegold Productions; Jerrold Tarog – Senior Year – Digitank Studios and Metric Films; Raul Jorolan – The Red Shoes – Unitel Productions and Unico Entertainment
Movie Actor of the Year	Movie Actress of the Year
Winner: **Coco Martin** – **Noy** – Cinemedia Films Inc and VIP Access Media Productions: John Lloyd Cruz – Miss You Like Crazy – Star Cinema; Christopher De Leon – Sa 'Yo Lamang – Star Cinema; Baron Geisler – Donor – Spark Films; Yul Servo – Rosario – Cinemabuhay International and Studio 5; Fanny Serrano – Tarima – Bluegold Production	Winner: **Ai-Ai Delas Alas** – **Ang Tanging Ina Mo, Last Na 'To** – Star Cinema: Bea Alonzo – Sa 'Yo Lamang – Star Cinema; Anne Curtis – In Your Eyes – GMA Films and Viva Films; Angelica Panganiban – Here Comes The Bride – Star Cinema, Quantum Films and Octo Arts Films; Lovi Poe – Mayohan – Cinemalaya Foundation, Inc. and Alpha Dog Productions; Lorna Tolentino – Sa 'Yo Lamang – Star Cinema; Dawn Zulueta – Sigwa – Beginnings Twenty Plus Production, Sineng Totoo Productions and Star Express
Movie Supporting Actor of the Year	Movie Supporting Actress of the Year
Winner: **Tirso Cruz III** - **Sigwa** – Beginnings Twenty Plus Production, Sineng Totoo Production and Star Express: Enchong Dee – Sa 'Yo Lamang – Star Cinema; Allen Dizon – Sigwa – Beginnings Twenty Plus Productions, Sineng Totoo Productions and Star Express; Emilio Garcia – Rekrut – Editcube Digital Studio; Sid Lucero – Rosario – Cinemabuhay International and Studio 5; Coco Martin – Sayo Lamang – Star Cinema	Winner: **Eugene Domingo** – **Tanging Ina Mo, Last Na 'To** – Star Cinema: Gina Alajar – Sigwa – Beginnings Twenty Plus Production, Sineng Totoo Productions and Star Express; Rustica Carpio – Tarima – Bluegold Productions; Dulce – Emir – Film Development Council of the Philippines; Zsa Zsa Padilla – Sigwa – Beginnings Twenty Plus Productions, Sineng Totoo Productions and Star Express; Gloria Romero – Tarima – Bluegold Productions
New Movie Actor of the Year	New Movie Actress of the Year
Winner: **Martin del Rosario** – **Dagim** – Creative Programs Inc.: Sam Concepcion – Cinco (Braso Episode) – Star Cinema; Robi Domingo – Cinco (Braso Episode) – Star Cinema; Mohammed Ibrahim – Happy Land – 8 Glass Productions; Xian Lim – Two Funerals – Cinemalaya Foundation and Teamwork Productions; Tom Rodriguez – Here Comes The Bride – Star Cinema, Quantum Films and Octo Arts Films Rocky Salumbides – Tarima – Bluegold Productions	Winner: **Carla Abellana** – Ssr 12 Punerarya Episode Regal Entertainment, Inc.: Melai Cantiveros – I Do – Star Cinema; Frencheska Farr – Emir – Film Development Council Of the Philippines; Ria Garcia – Ishmael – Creative Programs, Inc.; Sam Pinto – Si Agimat At Si Enteng Kabisote – Apt Entertainment – Gma Films, Imus Productions, Octoarts Films and M-Zet Productions; Gwen Zamora – Si Agimat At Si Enteng Kabisote – Apt Entertainment,Gma Films – Imus Productions, Octoarts Films and
Movie Child Performer of the Year
Winner: Tied between **Timothy Chan** – **Here Comes The Bride** – Star Cinema – Quantum Films and Octo Arts Films and **Xyriel Manabat** – **Tanging Ina Mo, Last Na 'To** – Star Cinema: Nash Aguas – Ssr 12 Punerarya – Regal Entertainment, Inc.; Elijah Alejo – Srr 12 (Mamanyika Episode) – Regal Entertainment.Inc.; Mahdi Yazdian Barjani – Emir – Film Development Council Of the Philippines; Abby Bautista – Petrang Kabayo – Viva Films; Jillian Ward – Agimat At Enteng – Apt Entertainment – Gma Films, Imus Productions, Octoarts Films and M-Zet Productions

=== Technical categories ===
Movie Original Screenplay of the Year	Digital Movie Original Screenplay of the Year
Winner: **Jerry Gracio** – **Emir** – Film Development Council Of the Philippines: Aloy Adlawan and Onay Sales – Srr 12 – Punerarya – Regal Entertainment Inc.; Mel Mendoza-Del Rosario – Tanging Ina Mo, Last Na 'To – Star Cinema; Elmer Gatchalian – Rosario – Cinemabuhay International and Studio 5; Ricardo Lee, Karen Ramos, Ralph Jacinto Quiblat – Sayo Lamang; Chris Martinez – Here Comes The Bride – Star Cinema – Quantum Films and Octo Arts Films	Winner: **Jerrold Tarog – Senior Year – Digitank Studios and Metric Films**: Bonifacio Ilagan Jr. – Sigwa – Beginnings Twenty Plus Productions, Sineng Totoo Productions and Star Express; James Ladioray – The Red Shoes – Unitel Productions and Unico Entertainment; Jerry Gracio – Muli – Mjm Productions; Mark Meily – Donor – Spark Films; Paul Sta Ana – Mayohan – Cinemalaya Foundation and Alpha Dog Productions; Neal Tan – Tarima – Bluegold Productions
Movie Cinematographer of the Year	Digital Movie Cinematographer of the Year
Winner: **Neil Daza** – **Emir** – Film Development Council Of the Philippines: Rodolfo Aves Jr. – Here Comes The Bride – Star Cinema – Quantum Films and Octo Arts Films Lee Briones; Meily – Sayo Lamang – Star Cinema; Mackie Galvez – Srr 12 (Punerarya Episode) – Regal Entertainment, Inc; Carlo Mendoza – Rosario – Cinemabuhay International and Studio 5; Manuel Teehankee – Miss You Like Crazy – Star Cinema	Winner: **Monino S. Duque** – **Sigwa** – Beginnings Twenty Plus Productions, Sineng Totoo Productions and Star Express: Jay Abello – Donor – Spark Films; Ike Avellana – The Red Shoes – Unitel Productions and Unico Entertainment; Albert Banzon – Muli – Mjm Productions; Arvin Bustos – Tarima – Bluegold Productions; Dan Villegas – Mayohan – Cinemalaya Foundation and Alpha Dog Productions
Movie Production Designer of the Year	Digital Movie Production Designer of the Year
Winner: **Edgar Martin Littaua** - **Sigwa**: Hahn – Rosario – Cinemabuhay International and Studio 5; Jesse Bueno and Ruben Arthur Nicdao – Agimat At Enteng, Apt Entertainment – Gma Films, Imus Productions, Octoarts Films and M-Zet Productions; Adelina Leung – Here Comes The Bride – Star Cinema – Quantum Films and Octo Arts Films Joey Luna and; Edgar Martin Littaua – Sayo Lamang – Star Cinema; Benjamin Padero – Srr 12 (Punerarya Episode) – Regal Entertainment, Inc.; Digo Ricio – Emir – Film Development Council Of the Philippines	Winner: **Edgar Martin Littaua** - **Sigwa** – Beginnings Twenty Plus Productions, Sineng Totoo Productions and Star Express: Adolfo Alix Jr – Muli – Mjm Productions; Bella Herrero – Paglilitis Kay Andres Bonifacio – Boy Abunda Productions and Boy So Productions; Benjamin Padero – Senior Year – Digitank Studios and Metric Films; Aped Santos – Donor – Spark Films; Adrian Torres – Ishmael – Creative Programs, Inc.
Movie Editor of the Year	Digital Movie Editor of the Year
Winner: **Marya Ignacio** – **Tanging Ina Mo, Last Na 'To**– Star Cinema: Efren Jarlego – Sayo Lamang – Star Cinema; Ike Veneracion – Here Comes The Bride – Star Cinema – Quantum Films and Octo Arts Films; Jerrold Tarog – Emir – Film Development Council Of the Philippines; Anthony L. John Wong – Rosario – Cinemabuhay International and Studio 5	Winner: **Bebs Gohetia** – **Sigwa** – Beginnings Twenty Plus Productions, Sineng Totoo Productions and Star Express: Edsel Abesamis, Maui Mauricio and Mai Dionisio – Happy Land – 8 Glasses Productions; Rocky Kho – Tarima – Bluegold Productions; Neil Sayno, Mark Pandy and Mark Meily – Donor – Spark Films; Jerrold Tarog – Senior Year – Digitank Studios and Metric Films; Jesson Yap – Mayohan – Cinemalaya Foundation Inc and Alpha Dog Productions
Movie Musical Scorer of the Year	Digital Movie Musical Scorer of the Year
Winner:**Josefino Chino Toledo** - **Emir**: Albert Chang – Rosario – Cinemabuhay International and Studio 5; Von De Guzman – Sayo Lamang – Star Cinema; Jessie Lasaten – Tanging Ina Mo, Last Na 'To – Star Cinema; Jessie Lasaten – Miss You Like Crazy – Star Cinema; Jesse Lucas – I'll Be There – Star Cinema	Winner: **Jerrold Tarog** – Senior Year – Digitank Studios and Metric Films: Sherwyn Castillo – Tarima – Bluegold Productions; Jessie Lasaten – The Red Shoes – Unitel Productions and Unico Entertainment; Lucien Letaba – Sigwa – Beginnings Twenty Plus Productions, Sineng Totoo Productions and Star Express; Mark Meily – Donor – Spark Films; Emerzon Texon – Mayohan – Cinemalaya Foundation and Alpha Dog Productions
Movie Sound Engineer of the Year	Digital Movie Sound Engineer of the Year
Winner: **Jerrold Tarog** – **Srr 12 (Punerarya Episode)** – Regal Entertainment: Albert Michael Idioma – Dalaw– Star Cinema; Albert Michael Idioma – Sayo Lamang – Star Cinema; Mike Idioma – Emir – Film Development Council Of the Philippines; Albert Michael Idioma – Here Comes The Bride – Star Cinema – Quantum Films and Octo Arts Films; Warren Santiago – Rosario – Cinemabuhay International and Studio 5	Winner: **Alfredo 'Dodoy' Ongleo** – **Sigwa** – Beginnings Twenty Plus Productions, Sineng Totoo Productions and Star Express: Ditoy Aguila – Ishmael – Creative Programs Inc.; Albert Michael Idioma – Donor – Spark Films; Emmanuel Nolet Clemente – The Red Shoes – Unitel Productions and Unico Entertainment; Jerrold Tarog – Senior Year – Digitank Studios and Metric Films; Junel Valencia, Mark Locsin and Ditoy Aguila – Muli – Mjm Productions
Movie Original Theme Song of the Year	Digital Movie Original Theme Song of the Year
Winner: **Bakit Ako Naririto** from the movie Emir. Composed by Gary Granada. Interpreted by Frencheska Farr: Kabayozong From The movie Petrang Kabayo. Composed by Edwin Marollano. Interpreted by Vice Ganda; Super Inday From the movie with the same title. Composed by Robert Javier. Interpreted by Jacq Dionisio	Winner: **Napapagod Din Ang Puso** from the movie Tarima. Composed by SherwynCastillo. Interpreted by Mj Ringo: Bawat Hakbang from the movie The Red Shoes. Composed by Divine Gil Reyes and Dan Gil. Interpreted by Nikki Gil; Hiwaga from the movie Mayohan. Composed by Paul Yap. Interpreted by Up Dharma; Kahapon from the movie Senior Year. composed and interpreted by Johnoy Danao; Lukso Ng Dugo from the movie Sigwa. Composed by Bonifacio Ilagan Jr., Interpreted by Ayen Laurel and Dessa Ilagan; Muli from the movie with the same title. Composed by Jimmy Antiporda, Dingdong Avanzado and Noel Ferrer. Interpreted by Dingdong Avanzado

=== Special awards ===
Darling of the Press

Winner: **E.R. Ejercito**

- Luis Manzano
- Annabelle Rama
- Daniel Razon
- Bong Revilla

- Ulirang Artista Lifetime Achievement Award: **Christopher de Leon**
- Ulirang Alagad ng Pelikula sa Likod ng Kamera: **Lily Monteverde**
- Star of the Night (male): **Richard Gomez**
- Star of the Night (female): **Toni Gonzaga**
- Face of the Night (male): **Xian Lim**
- Face of the Night (female): **Toni Gonzaga**
- Celebrity Skin of the Night: **Vina Morales**
