= Che Ramos =

Filipina actress

- Born: Cheryl Ramos; April 30, 1980 (age 46); Philippines
- Other names: Cheryl Cosio; Cherryl Ramos; Cheryl Ramos
- Education: University of the Philippines Los Baños
- Occupations: Actress and fitness trainer
- Years active: 2004–present
- Spouse: Chrome Prince Cosio (m. 2012)
- Children: 1

Cheryl Ramos-Cosio is a Filipina actress. She is known for her association with the Philippine New Wave Cinema and starring in Jerrold Tarog's Mangatyanan (2009), Senior Year (2010) and Goyo: Ang Batang Heneral (2018), and Brillante Mendoza's Captive (2012). She also starred in Prima Donnas as Darcy. In 2022, Ramos portrays the role of Dra. Katie Enriquez in the Philippine television medical drama, Abot-Kamay na Pangarap.

== Early life and family ==
Cheryl Ramos graduated with a bachelor's degree in sociology from the University of the Philippines Los Baños.

== Career ==
Ramos-Cosio began her career under the screen name Cheryl Cosio, appearing in the 2004 Laurice Guillen film Santa Santita.

In 2009, she played her first role in a Jerrold Tarog film, as the lead character in Mangatyanan. She later played "Ms. Joan" in Tarog's short film Faculty, which went viral in the runup to the 2010 Philippine presidential election. After that, she became one of Tarog's most regular collaborators, reprising the "Ms. Joan" role in Senior Year (2010), and playing roles in the 2018 runaway blockbuster Goyo: The Boy General.

She co-starred with Isabelle Huppert in the 2012 Brillante Mendoza film Captive. Other films in which she has appeared include Ka Oryang, Sundalong Kanin, Mariquina, A Second Chance, and Kung Paano Hinihintay ang Dapithapon.

== Personal life ==
Ramos-Cosio is married to fellow actor Chrome Cosio, with whom she has one daughter. Ramos-Cosio and her husband are fitness trainers.

== Filmography ==
=== Film ===
Year	Title	Role	Note(s)
2004	Santa Santita	Anna	
2007	Ataul: For Rent	Susan	
2007	Pain Things	–	
2009	Mangatyanan	Himalaya Marquez	
2009	Anacbanua	–	
2009	Ang Beerhouse	–	
2009	Patient X	Melinda	
2009	Off World	Julia	
2010	Faculty	Ms. Joan	Short film
2010	I Do	Mildred	
2010	Senior Year	Ms. Joan	
2011	Anatomiya ng Korupsiyon	Nita	
2011	Ka Oryang	–	
2012	Captive	Joan Corpuz	
2012	MNL 143	–	
2014	Mariquina	Leonor	
2014	Rice Soldiers	–	Original title: Sundalong Kanin
2015	A Second Chance	Mrs. Bernardo	
2015	Toto	Contessa	
2016	Purgatoryo	Mila	
2017	Ilawod	Mitch	
2017	The Debutantes	Lara's mother	
2018	Kung Paano Hinihintay ang Dapithapon	Marissa	
2018	Goyo: The Boy General	Hilaria Aguinaldo	Original title: Goyo: Ang Batang Heneral
2018	Hintayan ng Langit	Angie	
2019	Ang Babae sa Septic Tank 3: The Real Untold Story of Josephine Bracken	Jossefa	"Movie Cut"
2019	Maledicto	Kitty Colacion	
2019	Clarita	Dra. Teresa	
2019	Open	EM	
2019	Write About Love	Bernadette	
2022	Connected	Mira Toledo	
2023	Rookie	Ace's mother	
2023	Monday First Screening	–	
2025	How to Cheat Death	–	

=== Television ===
Year	Title	Role	Note(s)
2004–2005	Hiram	Emma	
2008	Love Books	Yoj	
2009	Tayong Dalawa	Audrey's OB Doctor	
2009	May Bukas Pa	Carmen Policarpio	
2010	Obra	—	
2010	1DOL	Melissa	
2011	Good Vibes	Charlene Perez-Weiss	
2011	Regal Shocker	Janice Salvacion	
2011–2012	Reputasyon	Lani Sta. Maria	
2014	Carmela: Ang Pinakamagandang Babae sa Mundong Ibabaw	Beng	
2014	Maalaala Mo Kaya: Red Envelope	Neighbor	
2015	Magpakailanman: My Mother is a Gambler	Stella	
2016	Once Again	Jessa	
2017	Wildflower	Joan	
2017	Meant to Be	Direk	
2018	Tadhana: Lihim at Liham	Marivic	
2018	Kambal, Karibal	Librada	
2019	Touch Screen	Mommy	
2019	Dragon Lady	Jennica Sotto	
2019	Hiwaga ng Kambat	Doc Pia Maniquis	
2019	Ang Babae sa Septic Tank 3: The Real Untold Story of Josephine Bracken	Jossefa	
2019–2021	Prima Donnas	Darcy	Supporting cast / Antagonist / Protagonist
2020	Like in the Movies	Adelaida Almasen	
2022	Mano Po Legacy: Her Big Boss	Millicent Rodrigo	
2022–2024	Abot-Kamay na Pangarap	Dra. Katherine "Katie" Enriquez	Main cast / Anti-hero
2023–2024	Pepito Manaloto: Tuloy ang Kwento	Jennifer	
2025	Sanggang Dikit FR	Vice Mayor Leslie Del Mundo	Guest protagonist
2026	Apoy sa Dugo	Chief Inspector Gabriela Sison	Recurring cast / Protagonist
2026	Tadhana: Dalawang Mukha ng Pag-ibig	Dra. Shiela Antonio-Tee	Parts 1 and 2
