= University of the Philippines Rural High School =

Public high school in Laguna, Philippines

- Mataas na Paaralang Rural ng Unibersidad ng Pilipinas (Filipino)
- UPRHS logo

Location
- Brgy. Paciano Rizal, Bay, Laguna; Philippines; 14°09′02″N 121°16′17″E

Information
- Type: UP Administered; State school
- Established: December 3, 1927
- Principal: Asst. Prof. Mabel S. Buela
- Grades: 7 to 12
- Website: uplb.edu.ph/high-school/

The University of the Philippines Rural High School was established as a subsidiary of the Department of Agricultural Education (DAE, now Department of Agricultural Education and Rural Studies or DAERS) of the University of the Philippines College of Agriculture, pursuant to Sec.4 of Act 3377 of the Philippine Legislature which was approved on December 3, 1927. The school, with a vocational curriculum, served as a practice school for the training of teachers, provided secondary education in agriculture for those preparing for college, and trained intermediate school graduates in agriculture.

Subsequently, it has evolved into its current status as a full, state university high school with a science-oriented curriculum aligned with that of UP Los Baños. It also has continued to serve as a teaching laboratory for UPLB students whose degree programs allow teaching options.

== History ==
Classes in the UPRHS were first held in the present rooms of the Department of Agricultural Economics. A concrete one-story building with a multi-purpose hall, two classrooms, a kitchen and a sewing room was constructed in 1931. At present the building now houses the Southern Tagalog Agricultural Resources, Research and Development Consortium Office.

With the institution of Home Economics in 1939, the school had two curricula—the Boys' and the Girls' Curricula—which were basically the same except that the latter had home economics.

During the Japanese regime, the school continued functioning with the major curricular changes in the replacement of English and U.S. History with Japanese, Filipino, Language, Reading, and Character Education.

Until the latter part of the 1950s, the UP Rural High School served as a practice school for majors in Agricultural Education. With the abolition of the certificate program for Junior-Agriculture teachers, the adoption of the eight-week off-campus practice teaching, and the diminution of the twenty-hours-a-week field work, the school gradually gave up its original function.

In 1960, the vocational curriculum was changed to College Preparatory by adding more academic courses (English, Mathematics, Science, History) and shortening the periods in Agriculture and Home Economics to only four hours and twenty minutes a week. The Boys and Girls Curricula were combined into one in 1969.

In December 1970, the UPRHS moved to the newly renovated Women's Dorm located in front of the St. Therese of Child Jesus Parish. The building provided a bigger library, chemistry laboratory, a kitchen, a sewing room, eight classrooms and faculty offices.

The School has implemented the 1960 curriculum up to 1999 with the replacement of the traditional history courses with Social Studies I (The Community), Social Studies II (The Nation), Social Studies III (Economic Development & Program), and Social Studies IV (The World: A Cultural Perspective), as well as the inclusion of the Youth Development Program (YDT) which covers Scouting, Physical Education, Music, and Citizen Army Training (later replaced by the Preparatory Military Training or PMT) as required by the Department of Education and Culture in 1972.

Since 1998, students, as prescribed by the present Department of Education, Culture & Sports, are now taking up Economics in their fourth year. World History, on the other hand, is now being offered to the juniors.

In 1979, Agriculture and Home Economics periods were further reduced to four hours a week. A change in the Mathematics curriculum was also implemented with the replacement of the traditional Mathematics courses with Math I (Modern Math), Math II (First Course in Algebra), Math III (Geometry), Math IV-A (Second Course in Algebra, part I), Math IV-B (Second Course in Algebra, part II), Math V (Introduction to Trigonometry), Math VI (Advanced Algebra), and Math VII (Introduction to Statistics). Advanced Mathematics classes have been offered starting school year 1980–81 to students who rate high in the math test of the entrance exam and later qualify in a test given to them.

In the school year 1999–2000, the Mathematics department proposed an amendment to the Math curriculum of UPRHS. To be implemented starting school year 2000-2001 are the courses Math 3-A (Advanced Algebra, formerly Math IV-A and IV-B) and Math 3-B (Geometry, formerly Math III). On the other hand, 4th year Math courses such as Math 4-A (Trigonometry with Introductory Calculus, formerly Math V & VI) and Math 4-B (Introduction to Statistics, formerly Math VII) will be offered starting school year 2001–2002.

The Science Curriculum has also been revised with a corresponding increase in number of credit units and number of class hours per week from three hours and thirty minutes per week with one unit credit to six hours per week with two units credit.

On June 21, 1999, UPRHS moved to its new home at Brgy. Paciano Rizal, Bay, Laguna. Since 2005, the school has been under the jurisdiction of the UPLB College of Arts and Sciences and is still recognized "as a state university high school of high academic achievement and of strong commitment to its continuing task in molding the youth".

On May 1, 2003, with the institution of the Bachelor of Science in Mathematics and Science Teaching Program, the administration of UP Rural High School was turned over to the College of Arts and Sciences (CAS), UPLB. Under the headship of CAS, UPRHS has strengthened its place in the university as BS MST students majoring in biology, Chemistry, Physics, and Mathematics undertake their field studies and teaching internship at UPRHS under the monitoring of the UPRHS faculty.

In 2013, UPRHS took the challenge of improving its curriculum in preparation for the implementation of the Enhanced Basic Education Program, otherwise known as the K-12 program.

UPRHS started the implementation of the Senior High School program in 2016. The said SHS program offers two strands of academic track curriculum: STEAM (Science, Technology, Engineering, Agriculture and Mathematics), and GAS (General Academics) with sub-strands on Business Studies and Humanities / Social Science. The school calendar shift was also approved by the Board of Regents the same year, thus making the school year open in August and end in May of the following year.

== Academics and Admissions ==
=== Admissions process ===
The UP Rural High School (UPRHS) Entrance Examination is a 3-hour and 20- minute competitive examination on the following areas: Language Proficiency, Reading Comprehension, Mathematics and Science.

Examinees who rank among the top 125 in the UP Rural High School Entrance Examination qualify for admission. In the event that some of them choose not to enroll, the vacated slots will be given to those in a waiting list, in the order of their ranking, until all 125 slots are filled.

=== Curriculum ===
Students undergo a college preparatory curriculum with an emphasis on the sciences and mathematics. This ensures that students are ready to take on challenges when they graduate and enter universities and colleges in the country and abroad.

=== Section History ===
From AY 2021-2022 to AY 2024-2025, UPRHS added one more section per batch. The following names are the newly added sections. Starting AY 2025-2026, these sections have been removed and the school has returned to its former, three-section system.

- First : Lanete
- Second : Batino
- Third : Banuyo
- Fourth : Mayapis

Prior to the SY 2021-2022, UPRHS had around 41 or 42 students in each section, with three sections per batch, in a total of about 125 students in each year level. Each section is named after a local tree.

- First : Dao, Ipil, and Tindalo
- Second : Dungon, Kamagong, and Katmon
- Third : Acacia, Mahogany, and Molave
- Fourth : Guijo, Narra, and Yakal

Prior to the transfer to the present site in Brgy Paciano Rizal Bay, Laguna in 1999, UPRHS had 4 sections each for a total of 160 students per year level. The following are the defunct sections of UPRHS.

- First : Lauan
- Second : Mancono
- Third : Apitong
- Fourth : Kalantas

== Notable alumni ==
- Emerlinda R. Roman, Ph.D. (Class 1966) - First female UP President^{*}
- Clare R. Baltazar, Ph.D. (Class 1943) - National Scientist and Professor Emeritus of Entomology, UPLB^{*}
- Antonio Mabesa (Class 1952) - Movie, television and theater actor; Professor Emeritus of CAL, UP Diliman. National Artist for Theater ^{*}
- Bonifacio Ilagan (Class 1968) - Multi-awarded writer and director^{*}
- Rizalina Ilagan (Class 1971) -nti-martial law activist who belonged to a network of community organizations in the Southern Tagalog region in the Philippines
- Jonas Baes, Ph.D.(Class 1977) - UP Diliman College of Music Professor^{*}
- Gen. Benjamin Madrigal Jr., PA (Class 1980) - Former chief of staff, Armed Forces of the Philippines; former administrator, Philippine Coconut Authority; member, National Security Council^{*}
- Jerrold Tarog (Class 1994) - multi-awarded film director, composer, writer, editor, and sound designer responsible for critically acclaimed feature films such as "Confessional", "Mangatyanan", "Senior Year" and the "Punerarya" segment of 2010's Shake, Rattle and Roll 12. His short film "Faculty" was featured on ANC's AmBisyon 2010, which showcased twenty of the brightest creative minds in today's Philippine cinema.
