= Sana Dati =

2013 Philippine romantic drama film

- Theatrical release poster
- English: If Only
- Directed by: Jerrold Tarog
- Written by: Ramon Ukit (Note: Jerrold Tarog is credited as screenwriter under the pseudonym Ramon Ukit, and as editor under Pats R. Ranyo.)
- Produced by: Daphne Chiu; Jerrold Tarog; Jose Mari Abacan
- Starring: Paulo Avelino; Lovi Poe; TJ Trinidad; Benjamin Alves
- Cinematography: Mackie Galvez
- Edited by: Pats R. Ranyo
- Music by: Jerrold Tarog
- Production company: Metric Films
- Distributed by: GMA Films
- Release dates: July 27, 2013 (Cinemalaya); September 25, 2013 (Philippines)
- Running time: 100 minutes
- Country: Philippines
- Language: Filipino

Sana Dati (English: If Only) is a 2013 Philippine romantic drama film written, directed, edited, and scored by Jerrold Tarog. The film stars Lovi Poe and Paulo Avelino. It is the final installment to Tarog's Camera trilogy which include Confessional (2007) and The Blood Trail (2009).

It is one of the entries of Cinemalaya 2013 under the Director's Showcase, where it won eight awards including Best Film. Tarog has released publicly a digital copy of the film's screenplay through his Twitter account.

== Synopsis ==
The film is a love story about a woman named Andrea (Lovi Poe) whose wedding is thrown into disarray when a mysterious guy, Dennis (Paulo Avelino) arrives and reminds her of the man she really loves.

== Cast ==
- Lovi Poe as Andrea Gonzaga
- Paulo Avelino as Dennis Cesario
- TJ Trinidad as Robert Naval
- Benjamin Alves as Andrew Cesario
- Chinggoy Alonzo as Eugene Naval
- Carla Martinez as Vivian Gonzaga
- Liesl Batucan as Baby Gonzaga
- Ria Garcia as Jamie Gonzaga
- Nico Antonio as John
- Gee Canlas as Loiza
- Nonie Buencamino as Judge Batac
- Menggie Cobarrubias as Pastor
- Cai Cortez as Jean
- Bong Cabrera as Joel
- Jess Evardone as Bong
- Gaby dela Merced as Ria
- Mihk Vergara as Fritz

== Awards ==
Year	Awards	Category	Recipient	Result	Ref.
2013	Cinemalaya 2013	Best Film	Sana Dati	Won	
2013	Cinemalaya 2013	Best Director	Jerrold Tarog	Won	
2013	Cinemalaya 2013	Best Sound	Roger "TJ" Ladro	Won	
2013	Cinemalaya 2013	Best Original Music Score	Jerrold Tarog	Won	
2013	Cinemalaya 2013	Best Editing	Pats R. Ranyo	Won	
2013	Cinemalaya 2013	Best Production Design	Ericson Navarro	Won	
2013	Cinemalaya 2013	Best Cinematography	Mackie Galvez	Won	
2013	Cinemalaya 2013	Best Supporting Actor	TJ Trinidad	Won	

== See also ==
- Jerrold Tarog
- Confessional (film)
- Mangatyanan
- Senior Year (2010 film)
- Cinema of the Philippines
