= Captive (2012 film) =

2012 film

- Theatrical movie poster
- Directed by: Brillante Ma. Mendoza
- Written by: Brillante Mendoza; Patrick Bancarel; Boots Agbayani Pastor; Arlyn dela Cruz
- Produced by: Didier Costet
- Starring: Isabelle Huppert
- Cinematography: Odyssey Flores
- Edited by: Yves Deschamps; Kats Serraon
- Music by: Teresa Barrozo
- Production companies: Swift Entertainment Production; Centerstage Production
- Distributed by: ABS-CBN Film Productions; (Philippines) (Note: Distributed under the joint label, Star Cinema/ABS-CBN Film Productions.); Équation Distribution; (France); Universal Pictures; (International)
- Release dates: February 12, 2012 (Berlin); June 9, 2012 (Mandaluyong); September 5, 2012 (Limited); September 19, 2012 (France); October 12, 2012 (BFI London Film Festival)
- Running time: 122 minutes
- Countries: France; Philippines; Germany; United Kingdom
- Languages: Filipino; French; English
- Budget: $1 million
- Box office: $2.2 million

Captive is a 2012 action psychological drama-thriller war film directed by Brillante Mendoza and starring Isabelle Huppert. The film was screened in competition at the 62nd Berlin International Film Festival in February 2012.

The plot focuses on describing the tortuous life of the hostages of the Dos Palmas kidnappings, whose survivors were freed after a year in captivity.

== Plot ==
At a beach resort in the Philippines, 20 guests are kidnapped by an Islamic separatist group fighting for the independence of Mindanao, with French social worker Therese Bourgoine among those taken to a jungle island. Over weeks and months, a strange bond grows between the kidnappers and hostages.

== Cast ==
- Isabelle Huppert as Thérèse Bourgoine
- Marc Zanetta as John Bernstein
- Katherine Mulville as Sophie Bernstein
- Maria Isabel Lopez as Marianne Agudo Pineda
- Mercedes Cabral as Emma Policarpio
- Sid Lucero as Abu Mokhif
- Kristoffer King as Jairulle
- Ronnie Lazaro as Abu Azali
- Mon Confiado as Abu Omar
- Raymond Bagatsing as Abu Saiyed
- Angel Aquino as Olive Reyes
- Bernard Palanca as Santi Dizon
- Allan Paule as Fred Siazon
- Archie Adamos as Randy Bardone
- Jelyn Nataly Chong as Jessica Lim
- Nico Antonio as Arnulfo Reyes
- Coco Martin as Abusama
- Neil Ryan Sese as Molazem
- Rustica Carpio as Soledad
- Che Ramos as Joan Corpuz

== Production ==
Coco Martin was supposed to have a lead role opposite the film's star Isabelle Huppert. Martin was supposed to play a Marine but had to drop out and settle for a cameo role due to conflicts with his taping schedule for the military fiction Minsan Lang Kita Iibigin.

== See also ==
- List of Philippine films of 2012
- List of French films of 2012
