= Senior Year (disambiguation) =

Senior Year may refer to:

- Senior (education), the final year in high school or college
- Senior Year (2010 film), a Philippine coming-of-age film
- Senior Year (2022 film), a film starring Rebel Wilson
- Senior Year, a version of the Lockheed U-2 aircraft

== See also ==
- Senioritis
- Twelfth grade
