= Mangatyanan =

- DVD cover
- English: The Blood Trail
- Directed by: Jerrold Tarog
- Written by: Ramon Ukit
- Produced by: John Silva; Franco Alido
- Starring: Che Ramos; Neil Ryan Sese; Irma Adlawan; Pen Medina
- Cinematography: Mackie Galvez
- Edited by: Pats R. Ranyo
- Music by: Jerrold Tarog
- Production companies: Cinemalaya Foundation; Bigtop Media Productions; Casa San Miguel; Metric Films
- Distributed by: Independent Filmmakers Cooperative (IFC); Videoflick Productions
- Release date: July 18, 2009 (Cinemalaya)
- Country: Philippines
- Language: Filipino

Mangatyanan (English: The Blood Trail) is a 2009 Philippine independent film written (under the pseudonym Ramon Ukit), directed, edited (under Pats R. Ranyo), and scored by Jerrold Tarog. The title refers to a Mangatyanan "blood trail" ritual of the Labwanan tribe, which plays an integral role in the plot. Both ritual and tribe were invented for the film.

Mangatyanan was a finalist in the full-length feature category of the 2009 Cinemalaya Philippine Independent Film Festival.

== Plot ==
The film tells the story of Himalaya "Laya" Marquez, a 27-year-old travel photographer who projects a cold, aloof persona to her family and workmates. The beginning of the film reveals that she is estranged from her mother Luzviminda, and her father, the famous Photographer Danilo Marquez. The film also reveals that she hasn't had a complete dream or a full night's sleep since age 12.

Things come to a head for Laya when Danilo suffers from a heart attack. Although she pays for his hospital bills, she refuses to see him at the hospital, which leads to even further strain between her and Luzviminda. It is revealed that Danilo used to visit Laya in her bedroom in the small hours of the night in order to abuse her - a fact which leads Laya's Luzviminda thinking that Danilo was seeing another woman, but not knowing that "the other woman" was in fact her daughter.

Not long after, Laya and new co-worker, Eric, assigned by their boss, Queen, to document the Mangatyanan blood trail ritual of the Labwanan, fictional Filipino tribe created for the story, before the practice dies out forever. When the pair meet the Labwanan, they discover a severely dwindled group whose cultural identity is now asserted only by their tribal leader Mang Renato. While documenting the ritual, Laya feels a connection between the tribe's predicament and her own.

When the disagreements and moral failures among the Labwanan lead to the disruption of the Mangatyanan ritual, Laya and Eric are asked to leave. Before finally leaving the tribe however, Laya runs away and takes it upon herself to perform the steps Mangatyanan ritual, one of the final steps of which is drinking a potentially fatal hallucinogenic concoction.

While Eric and the tribesmen attempt to resuscitate Laya, the effects of the drink give her a vision of her Edwary woody, who asks for her forgiveness, When she refuses, he instead convinces her to forgive her mother, which finally allows Laya to experience dignity and personal freedom.

== Production ==
The Blood Trail was shot over the course of ten days, partly in Manila, and partly in Zambales. Manila locales include EDSA, the Metro Rail Transit, and various establishments near the Elisabeth Seton school. Zambales locales included Anawangin Cove PAndaquit Casa San Miguel and Capones Island.

As Director, writer, composer, editor, and sound designer (credited under different names), Jerrold Tarog had a great deal of control over many aspects of the film, but recognized that the other people who made the film were as much its creators as he was, saying "There's no such thing as an Auteur."

=== Fictional Tribe, Language, and Ritual ===
In a disclaimer at the end of the film's credits, Director Tarog notes that: "The Labwanan Tribe of Dimacan, their languages and customs, including the Mangatyanan Ritual are products of fiction created for the purpose of allegory. They do not represent real indigenous tribes of the Philippines." In the two commentary tracks on the DVD, he claims that the language of the Labwanan was created from a mix of Kapampangan and Bisaya, and then modified slightly.

== Cast ==
- Che Ramos as Himalaya "Laya" Marquez
- Neil Ryan Sese as Eric
- Irma Adlawan as Luzviminda Marquez
- Publio Briones III as Mang Ramon
- Pen Medina as Danilo Marquez
- Mailes Kanapi as Queen
- Bor Ocampo as Junel
- Madeleine Nicolas as Manang Nida
- Ronald Legaspi as Mang Igo
- Julia Enriquez as Chits
- Danielle Afuang as Young Laya

== Accolades ==
=== Awards ===
- Festival Finalist - The Blood Trail - Cinemalaya Cinco 2009
- Best Production Design - Benjamin Padero - Cinemalaya Cinco 2009 - "for effectively creating the physical and oppositional terrains for the urban and rural, and the real and mystical, in a story of a young girl’s coming to terms with her own troubled past."
- Best Editing - Jerrold Tarog (credited as Pats R. Ranyo) - 8th Gawad Tagapuring mga Akademik ng Aninong Gumagalaw (2009 Gawad Tanglaw)

=== Nominations ===
- Best Actress - Che Ramos - 33rd Gawad Urian Awards (2010)
- Digital Movie Cinematographer of the Year - Mackie Galvez - 26th Philippine Movie Press Club Star Awards (2010)

== See also ==
- Jerrold Tarog
- Sana Dati
- Confessional (film)
- Senior Year (2010 film)
- Cinema of the Philippines
