= Lakić =

Lakić (Serbian: Лакић) is a surname. Notable people with the surname include:

- Dubravka Lakić, Serbian film critic
- Jovica Lakić, Serbian footballer
- Mara Lakić
- Ognjen Lakić
- Risto Lakić
- Srđan Lakić
- Zoran Lakić
- Sacha Lakic
