= D' Originals =

2017 Philippine television series

- Title card
- Genre: Drama
- Written by: Eli V. Peralta; James Harvey Estrada; Rae Red; Marianne Mixkaella Villalon; Jerome Zamora
- Directed by: Adolfo Alix Jr.
- Starring: Jaclyn Jose; LJ Reyes; Kim Domingo
- Theme music composer: Cecille Borja
- Opening theme: "Tukso Ka Ba?" by Imelda Papin
- Composer: Joshua Gapasin
- Country of origin: Philippines
- Original language: Tagalog
- No. of episodes: 60

Production
- Executive producer: Annalyn R. Ardoña-Cusiel
- Producers: John Mychael Feraren; JM Nebres
- Production locations: Quezon City, Philippines
- Camera setup: Multiple-camera setup
- Running time: 24–31 minutes
- Production company: GMA News and Public Affairs

Original release
- Network: GMA Network
- Release: April 17 – July 7, 2017

D' Originals is a 2017 Philippine television drama series broadcast by GMA Network. Directed by Adolfo Alix Jr., it stars Jaclyn Jose, LJ Reyes and Kim Domingo. It premiered on April 17, 2017 on the network's Afternoon Prime line up. The series concluded on July 7, 2017, with a total of 60 episodes.

The series is streaming online on YouTube.

== Premise ==
The series focuses on how far the wives would go to catch their husbands, deal with the other women and keep their families and self-respect intact.

== Cast and characters ==
Cast

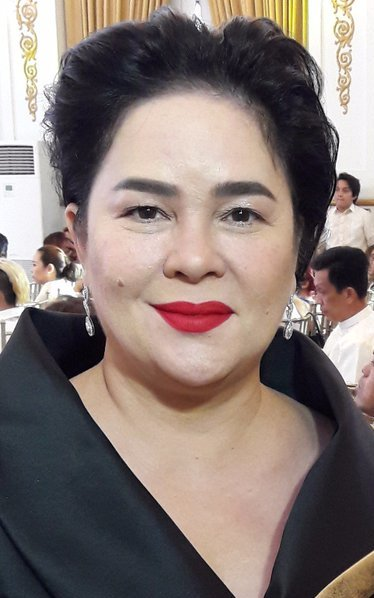
Jaclyn Jose

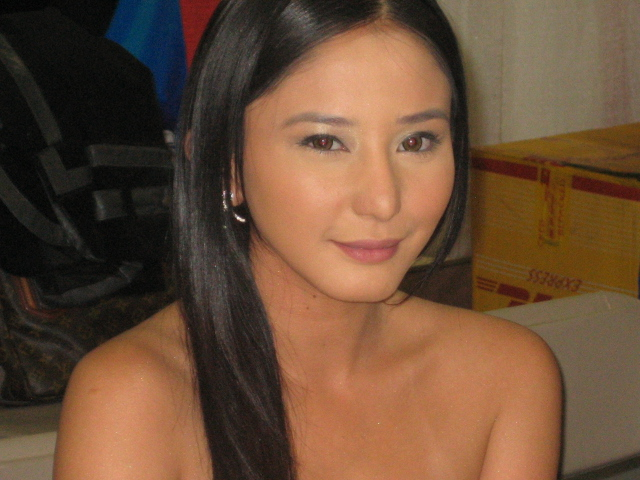
Katrina Halili

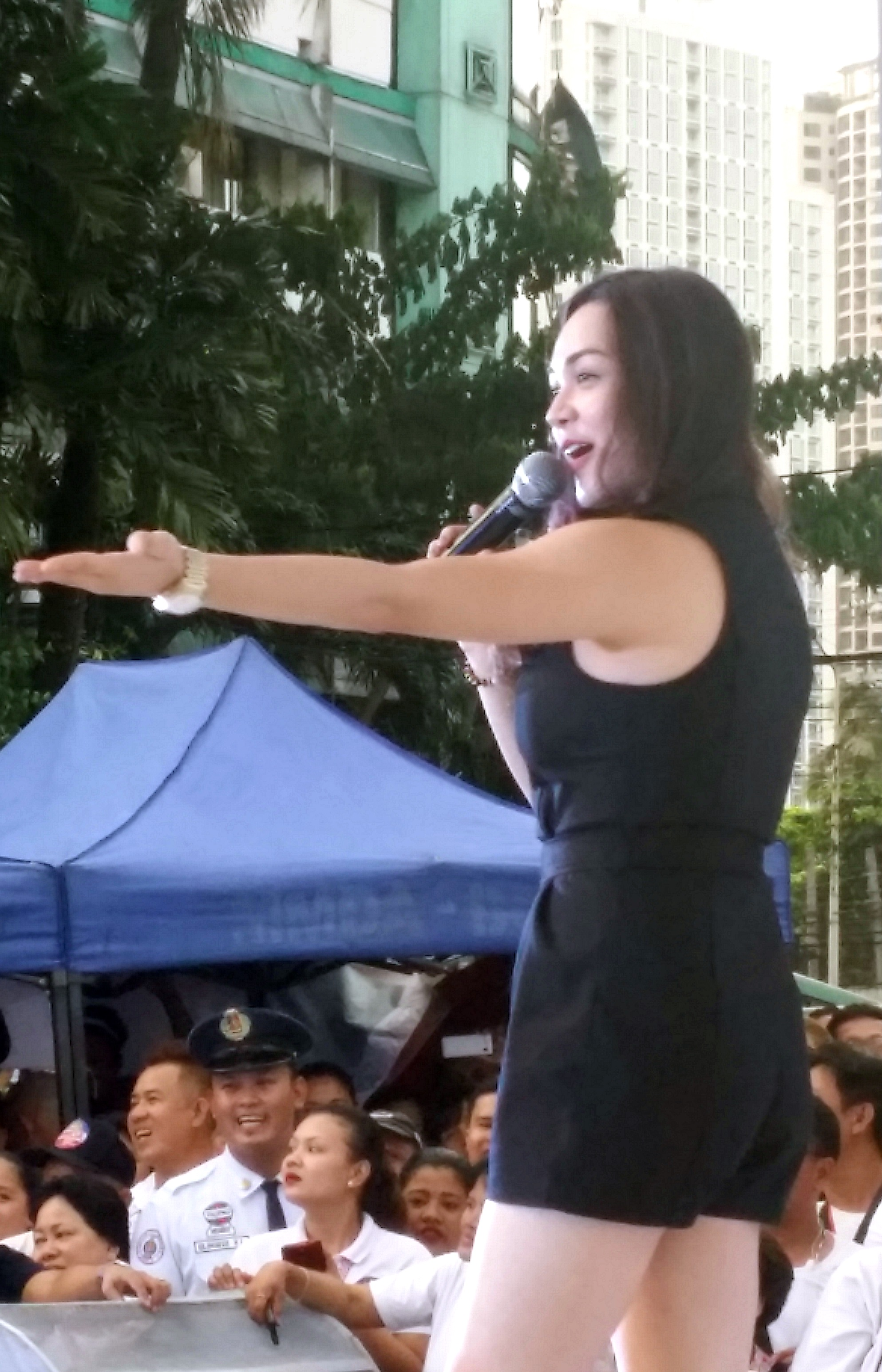
Meg Imperial

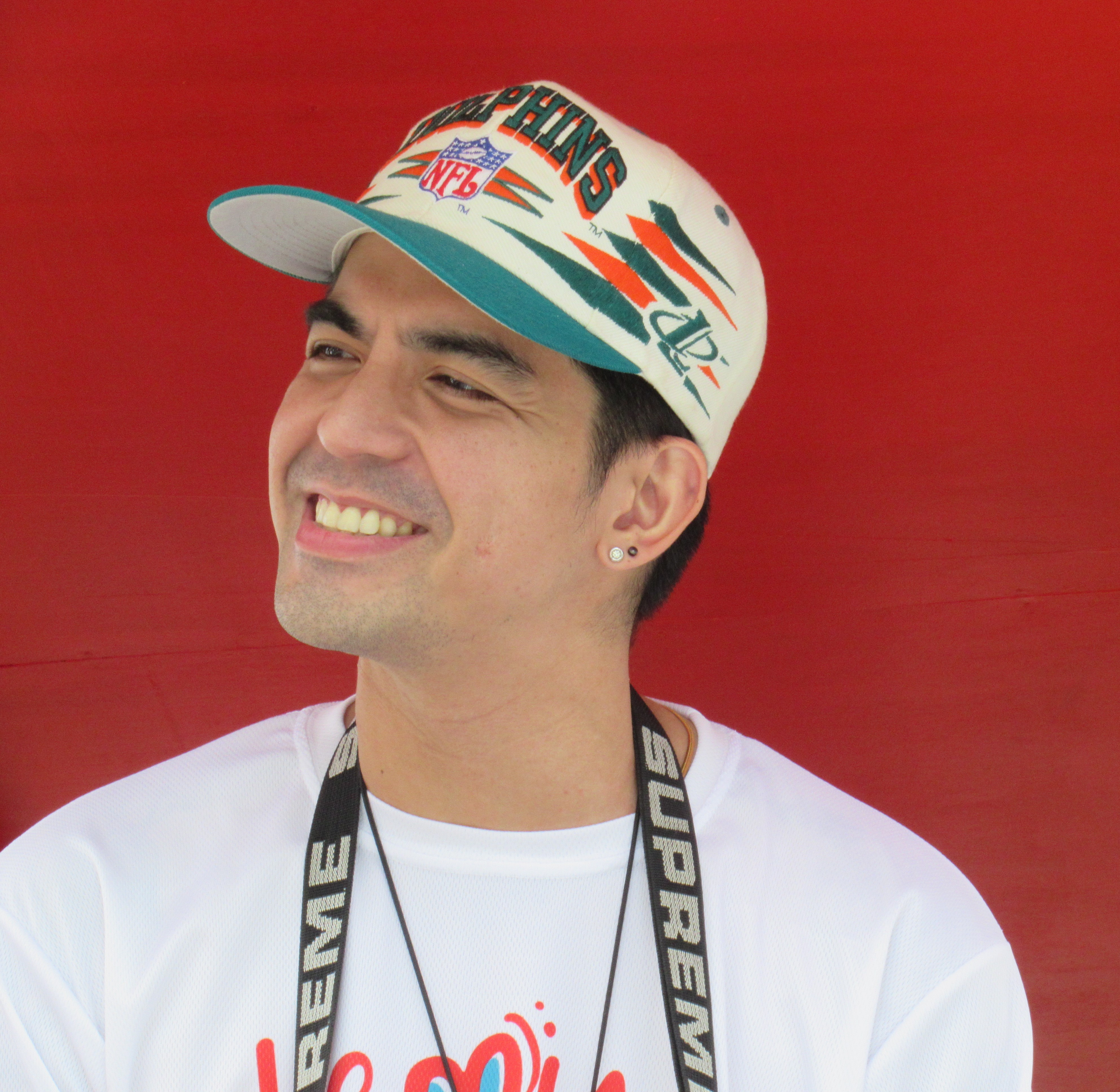
Mark Herras

Lead cast

- Jaclyn Jose as Jocelyn "Josie" Flores-Magpayo
- LJ Reyes as Marjorie "Marge" Pineda-Tolentino
- Kim Domingo as Sofia Abella-Godinez

Supporting cast

- Katrina Halili as Yvette Benitez
- Meg Imperial as Alice Perez
- Lovely Abella as Cristina "Tina" Pineda
- Jestoni Alarcon as Rolando "Lando" Magpayo
- Mark Herras as Carlos "Caloy" Tolentino
- Archie Alemania as Arthur "Art" Godinez
- Mikoy Morales as Tim Flores Magpayo
- Chlaui Malayao as Macy Flores Magpayo
- Elyson de Dios as Darren
- Arny Ross as Precious
- Dex Quindoza as Emman

Guest cast

- Coleen Perez as Sally
- Elle Ramirez as Tanya
- Manuel Chua as Raul
- Marx Topacio as Henry
- Antonette Garcia as Ria
- Princess Guevarra as Angel
- Mara Alberto as Joanna Marie
- Kirst Viray as Richard
- Kenneth Ocampo as Mac
- Arvic James Tan as Jason
- Raquel Monteza as Minerva
- Erlinda Villalobos as Pacing
- Dex Quindoza as Emman
- Jasper Visaya as Dwight
- Rain Quite as Kenzo
- Aprilyn Gustillo as April
- Andrea Torres as Gina
- Ina Raymundo as Liza
- Imelda Papin as herself
- Kim Last as Dan
- Alonzo Muhlach as Thor Perez-Godinez
- Gardo Versoza as Greg "Logo" Batumbakal
- Diana Zubiri as Isabel "Sabel" Buenaventura
- Maui Taylor as Gigi
- Andy Smith as Sofia's suitor
- Gina Alajar as an original

== Ratings ==
D'Originals ratings
No.	Original air date	AGB Nielsen NUTAM People
1	April 17, 2017	5.8%
2	April 18, 2017	5.5%
3	April 19, 2017	5.1%
4	April 20, 2017	5.7%
5	April 21, 2017	5.6%
6	April 24, 2017	4.7%
7	April 25, 2017	4.6%
8	April 26, 2017	4.8%
9	April 27, 2017	4.8%
10	April 28, 2017	4.6%
11	May 1, 2017	4.6%
12	May 2, 2017	4.3%
13	May 3, 2017	4.7%
14	May 4, 2017	4.8%
15	May 5, 2017	5.3%
16	May 8, 2017	4.6%
17	May 9, 2017	4.4%
18	May 10, 2017	4.8%
19	May 11, 2017	4.5%
20	May 12, 2017	4.4%
21	May 15, 2017	4.3%
22	May 16, 2017	4.1%
23	May 17, 2017	5.0%
24	May 18, 2017	5.0%
25	May 19, 2017	6.0%
26	May 22, 2017	6.2%
27	May 23, 2017	5.9%
28	May 24, 2017	5.6%
29	May 25, 2017	5.3%
30	May 26, 2017	5.9%
31	May 29, 2017	5.4%
32	May 30, 2017	5.4%
33	May 31, 2017	5.8%
34	June 1, 2017	5.7%
35	June 2, 2017	5.8%
36	June 5, 2017	5.6%
37	June 6, 2017	5.1%
38	June 7, 2017	5.2%
39	June 8, 2017	5.0%
40	June 9, 2017	7.3%
41	June 12, 2017	6.0%
42	June 13, 2017	5.2%
43	June 14, 2017	5.0%
44	June 15, 2017	4.9%
45	June 16, 2017	5.4%
46	June 19, 2017	4.8%
47	June 20, 2017	4.7%
48	June 21, 2017	4.5%
49	June 22, 2017	4.9%
50	June 23, 2017	5.3%
51	June 26, 2017	5.4%
52	June 27, 2017	4.9%
53	June 28, 2017	5.0%
54	June 29, 2017	4.5%
55	June 30, 2017	4.5%
56	July 3, 2017	4.5%
57	July 4, 2017	4.9%
58	July 5, 2017	4.7%
59	July 6, 2017	5.1%
60	July 7, 2017	5.4%

== Production ==
Principal photography commenced on February 21, 2017.
