= Ang Forever Ko'y Ikaw =

2018 Philippine television drama series

- Title card
- Also known as: Close to You
- Genre: Drama; Romantic comedy
- Written by: Joseph Balboa; Gina Marissa Tagasa; Abner Tulagan
- Directed by: Tata Betita
- Creative director: Caesar Cosme
- Starring: Camille Prats; Neil Ryan Sese
- Theme music composer: Mcoy Fundales
- Opening theme: "Ang Forever Ko'y Ikaw" by Ralf King
- Country of origin: Philippines
- Original language: Tagalog
- No. of episodes: 38

Production
- Executive producer: Mayee Fabregas
- Camera setup: Multiple-camera setup
- Running time: 19–23 minutes
- Production company: GMA Entertainment Content Group

Original release
- Network: GMA Network
- Release: March 12 – May 4, 2018

Ang Forever Ko'y Ikaw (transl. my forever is you / international title: Close to You) is a 2018 Philippine television drama romance comedy series broadcast by GMA Network. Directed by Tata Betita, it stars Camille Prats and Neil Ryan Sese. It premiered on March 12, 2018 on the network's afternoon line up. The series concluded on May 4, 2018, with a total of 38 episodes.

The series is streaming online on YouTube.

== Premise ==
The story revolves around Ginny and Lance, single parents who are still both attached to their past while hoping for a new chance at love. Their lives will start to intertwine with each other.

== Cast and characters ==
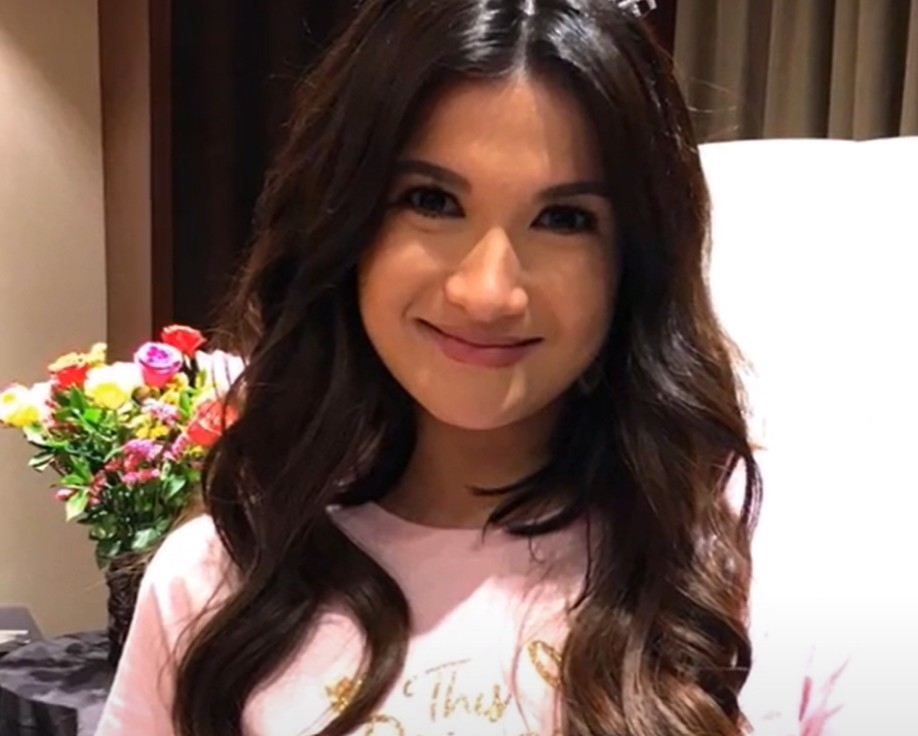
Camille Prats portrays Maria Virginia "Ginny Dyosabel" Peche-Capurian/Dimaigue

Lead cast

- Camille Prats as Maria Virginia "Ginny Dyosabel" Peche-Capurian/Dimaigue
- Neil Ryan Sese as Lance "Driveucrazy / Nuno Sa Puso" Dimaigue

Supporting cast

- Ayra Mariano as Marione Capurian
- Bruno Gabriel as Benjamin "Benjie" Dimaigue
- Cai Cortez as Marissa "Issa / Queenie" Mercado-Lastimosa
- Archie Alemania as Marco "Maoy" Lastimosa
- Odette Khan as Taneneng Capurian
- Rubi Rubi as Eew
- Rener Concepcion as Yak
- Adrian Pascual as Dax
- Joshua Jacobe as Jigs
- Kelvin Miranda as Raki
- Jude Paolo Diangson as Gino

Guest cast

- Aubrey Miles as Maya Reyes
- Arthur Solinap as Mario Capurian
- Bryan Benedict as Geraldo Roque
- Kyle Vergara as Mac / Nerdy
- Aira Bermudez as Honey Darling
- Princess Guevarra as Cheska
- Mel Kimura as Madam Seer
- Arianne Bautista as Margaret
- Ash Ortega as Liezel
- Marika Sasaki as Diane
- Mega Unciano as Gerry
- Carlos Agassi as Andrew

== Ratings ==
According to AGB Nielsen Philippines' Nationwide Urban Television Audience Measurement People in television homes, the pilot episode of Ang Forever Ko'y Ikaw earned a 4.3% rating. The final episode scored a 5.7% rating.
