= Princess Guevarra =

Filipino actress (born 1999)

- Born: Princess Pearl Guevarra Undag; March 7, 1999 (age 27); Imus, Cavite, Philippines
- Other names: Princess, Cess, Pearl
- Occupation: Actress
- Years active: 2015–2019
- Agent: GMA Artist Center (2015-2019)
- Spouse: Tony Triest (m. 2021)
- Children: 1

Princess Guevarra (born on March 7, 1999, in Imus, Cavite, Philippines) is a Filipino actress, and she is best known as one of the contestants in the 6th season of StarStruck, Guevarra signed a contract in GMA Artist Center in 2016.

== Career ==
=== 2016-present: Career beginnings ===
Guevarra became known after joining the season 6 edition of GMA Network’s reality show, StarStruck. She then bagged minor roles in GMA Network shows such as That's My Amboy and D' Originals. Currently she is working as a flight attendant at Philippines AirAsia . She was also chosen as its goodwill ambassador together with Steve Dailisan.

== Filmography ==
=== Television ===
Year	Title	Role
2018	Ang Forever Ko'y Ikaw	Cheska
2018	The One That Got Away	Armie
2017	Kambal, Karibal	Madel Gutierrez
2017	Daig Kayo Ng Lola Ko: Ang Alamat Ni Bernardo Carpio	Bernice
2017	Dear Uge: Classmate Ko Si Mommy	Bella
2017	Haplos	Massage Therapist
2017	My Love from the Star	Jennifer Abuzo
2017	Meant To Be	Libby
2017	"Magpakailanman: " The Healing Touch Of Love	Mutya
2017	D' Originals	Angel Guevarra
2017	Alyas Robin Hood	Young Cynthia
2016	Magpakailanman: Gay Organ Donor	Cheska
2016	That's My Amboy	Princess
