= Sisters on the Road =

- Hangul: 지금, 이대로가 좋아요
- Hanja: 只今, 이대로가 좋아요
- RR: Jigeum, idaeroga joayo
- MR: Chigŭm, idaeroga choayo
- Directed by: Boo Ji-young
- Written by: Boo Ji-young
- Produced by: Park Soon-hong
- Starring: Shin Min-a; Gong Hyo-jin
- Cinematography: Kim Dong-eun
- Edited by: Kim Su-jin
- Music by: Choi Seung-hyun
- Release dates: October 3, 2008 (Busan); April 23, 2009 (South Korea)
- Running time: 96 minutes
- Country: South Korea
- Language: Korean

Sisters on the Road (Korean: 지금, 이대로가 좋아요; RR: Jigeum, idaeroga joayo; lit. 'Now, things are just fine as they are') is a 2008 South Korean independent film written and directed by Boo Ji-young, and starring Shin Min-a and Gong Hyo-jin.

Filming was in 2007 and its world premiere was at the 2008 Busan International Film Festival. It was released in South Korean theaters in 2009.

== Plot ==
The sudden death of her mother brings Myung-eun back home to Jeju Island. There she meets her estranged sister Myung-ju and Myung-ju's daughter Seung-ah, still living at their old home, and Hyun-ah who has lived with them for over 20 years like a relative. A career woman whose hard exterior masks her illegitimacy and abandonment issues, Myung-eun tells Hyun-ah she wants to start looking for her father after the funeral. Single-minded in her desire to dig up memories of her father and discover why he left, Myung-eun resents that Myung-ju, who like their mother is a carefree fish trader and an unmarried mother of a young daughter, seemingly doesn't care. At first Myung-ju is reluctant to accompany Myung-eun, but after Hyun-ah persuades her, guilt and her sense of duty as an older sibling prevails. And so the two sisters who are dissimilar in character, lifestyle and even fathers go on a road trip together. On their trip, Myung-eun and Myung-ju quarrel over their differences, share secrets, reminisce about their past, and eventually embrace each other as family.

Director Boo Ji-young captures the delicately subtle atmosphere floating between women, and how inscrutable life is.

== Cast ==
- Shin Min-a as Park Myung-eun
- Gong Hyo-jin as Oh Myung-ju
- Kim Sang-hyun as Hyun-ah
- Lee Seon-hee as Eun-shil
- Chu Kwi-jung as Hye-sook
- Moon Jae-woon as Hyun-sik
- Bae Eun-jin as Seung-ah
