= Cart (film) =

- Theatrical release poster
- Directed by: Boo Ji-young
- Written by: Kim Kyung-chan
- Produced by: Jamie Shim
- Starring: Yum Jung-ah; Moon Jeong-hee; Kim Young-ae; Kim Kang-woo; Doh Kyung-soo; Hwang Jeong-min; Chun Woo-hee
- Cinematography: Kim Woo-hyung
- Edited by: Kim Sang-bum; Kim Jae-bum
- Production companies: Myung Films; 9ers Entertainment
- Distributed by: Little Big Pictures
- Release dates: September 7, 2014 (TIFF); November 13, 2014 (South Korea)
- Running time: 110 minutes
- Country: South Korea
- Language: Korean
- Box office: US$5.2 million

Cart (Korean: 카트) is a 2014 South Korean drama film directed by Boo Ji-young about employees of a retail supermarket who band together when the contract workers are laid off, it is both an ensemble drama and a social critique.

It made its world premiere in the City to City: Seoul sidebar of the 2014 Toronto International Film Festival. Cart will also screen at the 19th Busan International Film Festival and the 34th Hawaii International Film Festival.

== Plot ==
Sun-hee, a veteran cashier and mother of two, works at a large retail supermarket alongside Hye-mi, a single mother. Both are friendly with Soon-rye, a cleaning lady nearing retirement age, and all of them are temporary workers. Sun-hee is a model employee who works diligently in the belief that once she gets promoted as a regular worker, she'll be able to provide more for her children.

However, their corporate employer abruptly notifies them that all the temporary workers will be laid off. Faced with these wrongful dismissals, Sun-hee, Hye-mi, Soon-rye, and fellow female employees such as naive ajumma Ok-soon and twenty-something Mi-jin, resolve to go on strike. They stage a series of increasingly impassioned protests against the company's exploitative practices, which gains more strength when junior manager Dong-joon, the only male representative of the store's labor union, joins in.

The shy and passive Sun-hee, who finds herself thrust to the demonstrations' front lines, discovers within herself untapped resources of determination and resilience, which has an unexpected effect on her relationship with her estranged high school-age son, Tae-young. But as the women realize the power they can wield by taking a mutual stand, the company plays the workers against each other and Hye-mi, the leader of the strike, caves to the company's pressure and gives up.

== Cast ==
- Yum Jung-ah as Sun-hee
- Moon Jeong-hee as Hye-mi
- Kim Young-ae as Madam Soon-rye
- Kim Kang-woo as Dong-joon
- Doh Kyung-soo as Tae-young
- Hwang Jeong-min as Ok-soon
- Chun Woo-hee as Mi-jin
- Lee Seung-joon as Section chief Choi
- Ji Woo as Soo-kyung
- Park Soo-young as Manager
- Song Ji-in as Ye-rin
- Hwang Jae-won as Min-soo
- Kim Soo-an as Min-young
- Lee Seon-hee as Cashier
- Kim Hyun as Cashier
- Kim Hee-won as Convenience store boss (cameo)
- Gil Hae-yeon as Real customer (cameo)

== Background ==
The film is largely inspired by a 2007 incident in which Homever, a supermarket chain owned by E-Land Group, dismissed temporary workers, mostly women, and replaced them with outsourced employees to bypass a new law requiring that employees be given regular-worker status after a certain period. Dismissed employees and labor unions went on strike in front of the supermarket for 512 days until the matter was settled, with some employees reinstated. Director Boo Ji-young also studied the plight of irregular cleaning staff at major universities in Korea, including Hongik and Yonsei.

== Awards and nominations ==
Year	Award	Category	Recipient	Result
2014	15th Women in Film Korea Awards	Woman of the Year in Film	Yum Jung-ah	Won
2015	10th Max Movie Awards	Best New Actor	Doh Kyung-soo	Nominated
2015	20th Chunsa Film Art Awards	Best Actress	Yum Jung-ah	Nominated
2015	20th Chunsa Film Art Awards	Best Screenplay	Kim Kyung-chan	Nominated
2015	9th Asian Film Awards	Best Newcomer	Doh Kyung-soo	Nominated
2015	51st Baeksang Arts Awards	Best Actress	Yum Jung-ah	Won
2015	51st Baeksang Arts Awards	Best Supporting Actress	Moon Jeong-hee	Nominated
2015	51st Baeksang Arts Awards	Best Screenplay	Kim Kyung-chan	Won
2015	24th Buil Film Awards	Best Actress	Yum Jung-ah	Nominated
2015	24th Buil Film Awards	Best Supporting Actress	Moon Jeong-hee	Won
2015	24th Buil Film Awards	Best Screenplay	Kim Kyung-chan	Nominated
2015	35th Korean Association of Film Critics Awards	Top 10 Films of the Year	Cart	Won
2015	52nd Grand Bell Awards	Best Supporting Actor	Doh Kyung-soo	Nominated
2015	52nd Grand Bell Awards	Best Supporting Actress	Kim Young-ae	Nominated
2015	36th Blue Dragon Film Awards	Best Supporting Actress	Moon Jeong-hee	Nominated
2015	36th Blue Dragon Film Awards	Best Screenplay	Kim Kyung-chan	Nominated
