= Lee Seon-hee =

South Korean actress (born 1978)

- Born: Lee Seon-hee; 11 September 1978 (age 48); South Korea
- Other name: Lee Sun-hee
- Education: Seoul Institute of the Arts – Department of Drama)
- Occupation: Actress
- Years active: 2008–present
- Agent: WS Entertainment
- Known for: 100 Days My Prince; When the Weather Is Fine; Do Do Sol Sol La La Sol

Lee Seon-hee is a South Korean actress. She is known for her roles in dramas such as When the Weather Is Fine, When the Camellia Blooms, 100 Days My Prince and Do Do Sol Sol La La Sol. She also appeared in movies Casa Amor: Exclusive for Ladies, Alienoid, The Attorney, Sisters on the Road, Seondal: The Man Who Sells the River and The Wailing.

== Filmography ==
=== Television series ===
Year	Title	Role	Ref.
2017	Queen of Mystery	Seon-hui	
2018	Queen of Mystery 2	Seon-hui	
2018	100 Days My Prince	Mi-geum	
2019	When the Camellia Blooms	Jeong Gwi-ryeon	
2020	When the Weather Is Fine	Choi Soo-jung	
2020	Men Are Men	Italian Table owner	
2020	Do Do Sol Sol La La Sol	Ye-seo's mother	
2021	Our Beloved Summer	Lee Min-kyung	
2021	Uncle	Cook Mom employee	
2022	Green Mothers' Club	Bang Jeong-hee	
2022	Bloody Heart	Court Lady Kim	
2023	Mask Girl	Chief Oh	
2024	Wonderful World	Jeong Jin-hee	
2024	Hide	Go Chun-hee	
2025	Buried Hearts	Hyeon Ja-ok	

=== Web series ===
Year	Title	Role	Ref.
2021	Adult Trainee	Na-eun's mother	
2022	Stock Struck	Diner lady	

=== Film ===
Year	Title		Role
Year	English	Korean	Role
2009	Sisters on the Road	지금, 이대로가 좋아요	Eun-shil
2013	Kisses	키스	Landlady
2013	Love Scene	러브씬	Seg. Smoke performance
2013	The Attorney	변호인	Evening school student
2014	Cart	카트	Cashier
2015	Casa Amor: Exclusive for Ladies	워킹걸	Housewife
2015	The Liar	거짓말	Ah-yeong's older sister
2016	The Wailing	곡성	Byeong-gyu's wife
2016	Seondal: The Man Who Sells the River	봉이 김선달	Village lady
2020	Move the Grave	이장	Baek Geum-ok
2020	Please Don't Save Me	나를 구하지 마세요	In-kyung
2021	Don't Go Too Far	멀리가지마라	Jeong Eun-hye
2022	Alienoid	외계+인 1부	Inn owner
2023	Leak	실금	Soo-hee
2023	Concrete Utopia	콘크리트 유토피아	Ju-mong's mother
2024	Troll Factory	댓글부대	Pyo Ha-jeong

== Awards and nominations ==
Name of the award ceremony, year presented, category, nominee of the award, and the result of the nomination
Award ceremony	Year	Category	Result	Ref.
6th Asiana International Short Film Festival Face Award	2008	Best Actress	Won	
