= Ruel Antipuesto =

Cebuano film director and cinematographer (born 1973)

Ruel Dahis Antipuesto
- Born: Ruel Dahis Antipuesto; August 13, 1973; Ozamiz, Philippines
- Citizenship: Philippines
- Education: University of San Carlos (MBA); Misamis University
- Occupations: Film director, cinematographer
- Years active: 2002–present

Ruel Dahis Antipuesto, known simply as Ruel Antipuesto, is a Cebuano film director and cinematographer from the Philippines. Considered as "The Godfather of Cebuano Filmmaking", he is a major contributor to the new wave of Cebuano filmmaking as he continues to mentor and collaborate with younger filmmakers while his works continue to gain national and international awards and recognition.

== Biography ==
Ruel Dahis Antipuesto began as an engineer. When the filmmaking became digital in the late 1990s, he taught himself filmmaking by making animations and documentaries.

In 2004, the animated short film, The Snake's Pit won him his first national award.

In 2007, the full-length movie Confessional, he photographed and co-directed with Jerrold Tarog won several national awards as well as best first feature in OSIAN Cinefan in India. It was also in exhibition in Germany, South Korea and the United States. Soon after, his documentary projects were acquired for distribution and one won in the 2009 Cine-Indie MDG competition.

Through the years he has accumulated several awards as his works have been included in various local and international competitions and exhibitions held in Portugal, United Kingdom, Germany, South Korea, United States, India, France, Spain, Italy (in Venice and Rome), Canada, Switzerland, Russia, Brazil, Japan and the ASEAN region.

== Filmography ==
Year	Title	Type	Credit	Awards & Festivals
2004	The Snake's Pit	Animated short film	Director; Animator	17th Gawad CCP: Best Animated Short Film, Best Regional Entry
2006	Carpool	Short film	Cinematographer	19th Gawad CCP: Best Short Feature
2007	Confessional	Feature film	Director; Cinematographer; Producer	Cinema One Originals: Best Film, Directors 24th PMPC Star Awards: Digital Category Best Film, Directors; 10th Osian's Cinefan (New Delhi, India): Best Film, First Features Category; 10th Cinemanila International Film Festival: Best Film, Southeast Asian Category; 2008 San Francisco International Film Festival, exhibition film (USA); 14th Pusan International Film Festival, exhibition film (Korea)
2009	Sabongero	Short film	Cinematographer; Producer	2010 Cannes Short Film Corner
2010	Eskrimadors	Documentary	Cinematographer	2010 Cinemalaya Philippine Independent Film Festival, exhibition film 2010 Cinemanila International Film Festival, exhibition film (Philippines)
2011	Señorita	Feature film	Cinematographer	2011 Vancouver International Film Festival, exhibition film (Canada)
2011	My Paranormal Romance	Feature film	Cinematographer	Cinema One Originals: Special Jury Prize
2013	The Muses	Feature film	Cinematographer	
2014	Death Squad Dogs	Short film	Cinematographer	
2015	Swap	Feature film	Cinematographer	San Sebastian International Film Festival, exhibition film (Spain); 2nd Silk Road International Film Festival, competition film (China) 2015 São Paulo International Film Festival, exhibition film (Brazil); 2015 San Diego Asian Film Festival, exhibition film (USA); 2015 Tokyo FILMeX, competition film (Japan); 2015 Minsk International Film Festival, exhibition film (Russia); 2015 Jogja Asian Film Festival, (Indonesia): Silver Hanoman Award
2015	Sanctissima	Short film	Cinematographer	Cinemalaya 2015: Audience Choice award UPelikula 2015: Best Film, Director, Cinematography
2015	Kapatiran	Documentary	Cinematographer	Karlovy Vary International Film Festival, Czech Republic
2016	Patay na si Hesus	Feature film	Cinematographer	QCinema 2016: Audience Choice Award, Gender Sensitive Film Award
2016	Lily	Feature film	Cinematographer	Cinema One Originals 2016: Best Director, Best Editing Award, Best Actor, Best Supporting Actress
