= The Gift to Stalin =

- Directed by: Rustem Abdrashev
- Written by: Pavel Finn
- Produced by: Boris Cherdabayev, Aliya Uvalzhanova
- Starring: Nurjuman Ikhtimbayev; Dalen Shintemirov; Yekaterina Rednikova; Bakhtiar Khoja
- Cinematography: Khasan Kidiraliev
- Release dates: 2 October 2008 (Pusan International Film Festival); 16 October 2008
- Running time: 97 minutes
- Countries: Kazakhstan; Russia; Poland; Israel
- Language: Russian

The Gift to Stalin is a 2008 joint Kazakhstani/Russian/Polish/Israeli film by Kazakhfilm that tells the story of a little Jewish boy named Sasha who is sent to Kazakhstan. He is saved from death by an old Kazakh man, Kasym, who takes the boy into his home. The film is set in 1949 and is based on the memoirs of Russian Jewish writer David Markish, also portrayed in his trilogy A New World for Simon Ashkenazy.

The title, The Gift to Stalin, has two meanings. The first one Sasha’s dream He hopes that if he gives Stalin a gift, he will be able to see his parents again, not knowing that they have been killed. The second context is that in 1949 the Soviet government carried out a nuclear test (RDS-1) on Joseph Stalin’s 70th anniversary. (Note: During Stalin's life, his official birth year was 1879.) When Sasha visited his Kazakh aul many years later, he found it destroyed by the nuclear explosion.

== Awards ==
- 2009: Grand Prix at the Busan International Film Festival
- 2009:Three awards at the Warsaw Jewish Film Festival, Grand Prix, the best full feature, and best actor (Dalen Shintemirov)
