= Neil Ryan Sese =

Filipino actor

- Born: Lucena, Quezon, Philippines
- Occupations: Actor, model
- Years active: 2001–present
- Agents: ABS-CBN (2001-2004, 2007-2011); GMA Network (2004-2007, 2011-present); Sparkle GMA Artist Center (2011-present)
- Known for: Encantadia; Ang Forever Ko'y Ikaw; Cruz vs Cruz
- Height: 1.75 m (5 ft 9 in)

Neil Ryan Sese is a Filipino actor. Sese is best known for portraying Asval in the 2016 version of Encantadia, Lance Dimaigue of Ang Forever Ko'y Ikaw, and Manuel Cruz of Cruz vs Cruz.

== Background ==
An only child, he grew up in Lucena City, Quezon, where his mother, Rosalyn Sese, took charge of his upbringing, enrolled him at Maryhill Academy. In 1993, he wanted to study at the University of Santo Tomas to be with his peers but his mother told him to enroll at the University of the Philippines. So he took a nonquota course entrance exam. The first year was devoted to general subjects like mathematics, but he soon found himself auditioning and appearing in Dulaang UP plays.

By the second year, he was enjoying being a campus actor, appearing in classic plays like Oedipus Rex and learning a lot from mentors like director Tony Mabesa and actor Rey Ventura. He dropped his plan to take up Mass communication major in Theatre Arts. He has been at it ever since. He appeared in both classics and Asian dramas such as St. Louis Loves Dem Filipinos, Hudhud, Kanjincho, Sepharad: Voces de Exilio, Basilia Ng Malolos, Sa Ngalan Ng Anak, etc.

In 2011, he played the role of Simeon in the highly successful TV drama series, Munting Heredera which he considered as his biggest break ever. His career is currently handling by an award-winning director/manager Maryo J. de los Reyes. The same year, he signed a three-year exclusive contract with GMA Network. His first project as an exclusive talent of the network was the series Biritera where he played one of the lead roles.

Sese is also a favorite of indie film directors, landing choice roles in acclaimed movies like Ang Pagdadalaga ni Maximo Oliveros, Mangatyanan, Sanglaan and Huling Pasada.

In Amphitryon, a Dulaang UP production directed by Jose Estrella, he displayed a comedic side. He played Stanley Kowalski in Tanghalang Pilipino's Flores Para los Muertos (a translation of Tennessee Williams' A Streetcar Named Desire), directed by Floy Quintos.

== Filmography ==
=== Film ===
Note: Both mainstream and independent films

- Caregiver (Norman)
- Aishete Masu (Hiroshi)
- Beautiful Life (Matsumoto)
- Here Comes The Bride (Inyaki's dad)
- Gatas Sa Dibdib Ng Kaaway (Interpreter)
- Noy (Policeman)
- Paano Na Kaya?
- Shake, Rattle & Roll XI
- Sukob (Michael)
- Kutob (Philip)
- Matakot Ka Sa Karma (Poldo)
- Malikmata (Medium)
- Filipinas (Rex)
- Ang Pagdadalaga ni Maximo Oliveros (Boy)
- Kubrador
- Seroks
- Huling Pasada
- Mangatyanan (Eric)
- Buenavista
- Sanglaan (Henry)
- Hawang
- Graveyard Shift
- Layang Bilanggo (Sgt. Sese)
- Tsardyer (Ahmad)
- ID (Bimbo)
- Colorum (Policeman)
- Kamoteng Kahoy
- Haw-Ang
- Mark, Matthew, Luke and John
- My Little Bossings
- La Amigas (Hostage Taker)
- Seklusyon
- Voltes V: Legacy – The Cinematic Experience (Larry Hook)
- GomBurZa (Máximo Inocencio)

=== Television / Digital Series ===
Year	Title	Role
2001	Sa Dulo ng Walang Hanggan	Neil
2003	Darating ang Umaga	board member
2003	Basta't Kasama Kita	Buloy
2003	Buttercup	Lance's lawyer
2003	Wansapanataym	Louie Salvacion
2003	Kay Tagal Kang Hinintay	Dr. Fajardo
2004	Hanggang Kailan	Father Edwin
2004	Krystala	Rolly
2004	Spirits	Bantay-daya
2005	Ang Mahiwagang Baul: Bakit May Korona ang Bayabas	Lunak
2005	Saang Sulok ng Langit	Mike
2005	Etheria: Ang Ika-Limang Kaharian ng Encantadia	Victu
2006	Agawin Mo Man ang Lahat	Teodoro "Teddy" Besa
2007	Maria Flordeluna	Adolfo
2007	Prinsesa ng Banyera	Harry Medina
2007	Lupin	Lopez
2008	Your Song: Muntik Na Kitang Minahal	Arah's father
2008	Carlo J. Caparas' Pieta	Geron
2009	The Wedding	Charlie
2009	Tayong Dalawa	Atty. Sandoval
2009	Agimat: Ang Mga Alamat ni Ramon Revilla: Tiagong Akyat	Albert "Abet" Ronquillo
2009	Precious Hearts Romances Presents: Somewhere in My Heart	Menggay's father
2009	Carlo J. Caparas' Totoy Bato	Farmer
2009	SRO Cinemaserye: Exchange Gift	EJ's father
2010	5 Star Specials	Sr. Inspector Feliciano
2010	May Bukas Pa	Rupert
2010	Rod Santiago's Agua Bendita	Señor Lucas
2010	1DOL	Samson Suarez
2010	Noah	Ramon
2010	Wansapanataym: Karina Kariton	Boyet's father
2010	Your Song: Kim	Noreen's father
2010	Koreana	Ferdie Roces
2011	Star Confessions	Miguel
2011–2012	Munting Heredera	Simeon Velasco
2011	Nasaan Ka, Elisa?	Luis Mañalac
2012	Regal Shocker: Pelikula	Richard
2012	Biritera	Eric Fuentebella
2012	My Daddy Dearest	Val
2012	Paroa: Ang Kuwento ni Mariposa	Armando Villamor
2012–2013	Pahiram ng Sandali	Andrew Gomez
2013	Indio	Kardo
2013	Love and Lies	Ricardo Salvador
2013	Anna Karenina	Abel Barretto
2013	Adarna	Kestrel
2014	Paraiso Ko'y Ikaw	Berto Perez
2014	Niño	David Inocente
2015	The Half Sisters	Jacob Dela Rhea
2015	Let the Love Begin	Jesse
2015	My Faithful Husband	Dr. Pitargue
2015	Healing Hearts	Michael "Mike" Espanto
2016	Wish I May	Gabo Villafuerte†
2016	Dear Uge: Faking Girls	Anthony
2016–2017	Encantadia	Asval †
2017	Tadhana: Aishiteiru	Jiro
2018	Ang Forever Ko'y Ikaw	Lance "Driveucrazy/Nuno Sa Puso" Dimaigue
2018	Contessa	Eric†
2018	Ika-5 Utos	Randy Lorenzo†
2018	Magpakailanman: The Haunted Wife	Johnny
2018	Onanay	Emmanuel "Emman" Cruz†
2019	Bihag	Amado Anzures
2020	Descendants of the Sun	Rodel Dela Cruz
2021	Babawiin Ko ang Lahat	Jun Roxas
2022	Start-Up PH	Chito Sison
2023	Voltes V: Legacy	Dr. Larry Hook
2023–2024	Black Rider	Stephen Crisostomo-Dimaculangan
2024	Pulang Araw	Lauro Torres
2025–2026	Cruz vs Cruz	Manuelito "Manuel" Cruz
2026	Kamao	Fernando "Nonoy" Batumbacal
