= Er Dong =

- Film poster
- Directed by: Yang Jin
- Written by: Yang Jin
- Produced by: Cui Zi'en
- Starring: Bai Li Jun
- Cinematography: Situ Zhixia
- Edited by: Sai Ma; Jin Yang
- Distributed by: dGenerate Films
- Release date: October 2008 (Busan International Film Festival)
- Running time: 151 minutes
- Country: China
- Language: Mandarin

Er Dong (Chinese: 二冬; pinyin: èr dōng), directed by Yang Jin (Chinese: 杨瑾; pinyin: Yáng Jǐn), is a 2008 narrative independent Chinese film about a rebellious teenager in rural northern China. The film is shot in documentary-style and is the director's second feature.

== Plot ==
Er Dong and his Christian mother live in a rural Chinese village. She sends him to a Christian boarding school because of his inappropriate behavior, hoping that God will give him a new direction in life. At the school, Er meets a girl, Chang'e, and they are almost expelled because of their misconduct.

== Festivals ==
- Rotterdam International Film Festival
- Pusan International Film Festival
- Hong Kong International Film Festival
