= Boo Ji-young =

South Korean director and scriptwriter

- Born: September 16, 1971 (age 54); South Korea
- Occupation(s): Director and scriptwriter
- Years active: 2003–present

Korean name
- Hangul: 부지영
- RR: Bu Jiyeong
- MR: Pu Chiyŏng

Boo Ji-young (born September 16, 1971) is a South Korean director and scriptwriter. After graduating from the Korean Academy of Film Arts, she began her career in independent filmmaking in South Korea. She created her first film Sisters on the Road in 2008. She is best known for her film Cart (2014), which was screened at many international film festivals.

== Early life and education ==
Boo graduated from Korean Academy of Film Arts. After that, she was the script supervisor on Lee Jae-yong's Untold Scandal in 2003.

== Career ==
Boo made her first feature film Sisters on the Road in 2008. The film examined the thought and state of womanhood in modern South Korean society. She was invited to the Busan International Film Festival, International Women's Film Festival, and the Tokyo International Women's Film Festival to screen the film. Later, she created an experimental omnibus documentary called Myselves: The Actress No Makeup Project (2012). She has also collaborated on several omnibus film projects such as the human rights project If You Were Me 5 (2010) and the Jeonju International Film Festival's 'Short! Short! Short! in 2011.

Boo is best known for her film Cart from 2014, based on a real events in South Korea. It was screened at the Toronto International Film Festival. Boo was interested in the issues related to women and labourers in South Korea. She believes that the public should see women directors as equal to men directors, rather than categorizing women directors as "women's cinema" when they make films.

== Filmography ==
- Cart 2014 ( Director and Scriptwriter )
- Myselves : The Actress No Makeup Project 2012 ( Director and Editor）
- A Time to Love 2011 ( Director )
- Moonwalk 2011 ( Director and Scriptwriter )
- Sisters On The Road 2009 ( Director and Scriptwriter )
- Untold Scandal 2003( Scriptwriter )

== Awards and Invitations ==
- Cart SEOUL International Women's Film Festival (2015) - Polemics #IAmAFeminist
- Cart New York Asian Film Festival (2015) - "MYUNG FILMS: Pioneers And Women Behind The Camera In Korean Film "
- Cart Udine Far East Film Festival (2015) - Competition Section
- Cart CAAMFest (2015) - CinemAsia
- Cart Santa Barbara International Film Festival (2015) - Pan Asia
- Cart Asian/Asian-American film festival (2014) - Audience Award
- Cart Toronto International Film Festival (2014) - City to City
- Cart Hawaii International Film Festival (2014) - Spotlight on Korea
- Cart Busan International Film Festival (2014) - Open Cinema
- Myselves : The Actress No Makeup Project Women's International Film Festival in Chennai (2012)
- Myselves : The Actress No Makeup Project SEOUL International Women's Film Festival (2012)
- Myselves : The Actress No Makeup Project Yubari International Fantastic Film Festival (2012)
- Moonwalk Women's International Film Festival in Chennai (2012)
- A Time to Love Cinemanila International Film Festival (2011) - World Cinema
- Myselves : The Actress No Makeup Project Seoul Independent Film Festival(SIFF) (2011) - Opening Film
- Sisters On The Road The Asian Women's Film Festival (2009) - New Asian Cinema
- Sisters On The Road Tokyo International Women's Film Festival (2009)
- Sisters On The Road Hong Kong Lesbian & Gay Film Festival (2009) - Asian Power
- Sisters On The Road Asian Film Festival, Mumbai (2009) - Competition
- Sisters On The Road Karlovy Vary International Film Festival (2009) - Forum of Independents
