= Française (film) =

Française (French Girl)
- Directed by: Souad El-Bouhati
- Screenplay by: Souad El-Bouahti
- Produced by: Jem Productions
- Starring: Hafsia Herzi, Farida Khelfa, Maher Kamoun, Aymen Saidi, Amal Ayouche
- Cinematography: Mathieu Mouraud, Frédérique Barraja
- Edited by: Josiane Zardoya, Caroline Dulac
- Music by: Patrice Gomis
- Release date: 2008
- Running time: 74 minutes
- Countries: France; Morocco

Française is a 2008 film.

== Synopsis ==
Sofia, born in France of North African parents, lives a happy childhood in a French suburban city. Her father, feeling homesick, decides to take all the family back to Morocco. Sofia suddenly finds herself on a Moroccan farm. She is just ten years old and swears she will pass all her exams with flying notes to be able to go back to France when she is eighteen. But life is full of surprises…

== Awards ==
- Rotterdam International Film Festival (2009)
- Dubai International Film Festival (2008)
