= Dubravka Lakić =

Serbian film critic

Dubravka Lakić (Serbian Cyrillic: Дубравка Лакић) is a Serbian film critic who has been writing for the Politika daily newspaper since 1989. She is a member of the European Film Academy (EFA), a member of the Executive Board of the Federation of Film Critics of Europe and the Mediterranean (FEDEORA), a member of the International Federation of Film Critics (FIPRESCI), a selector of the international program of the Cinema City IFF in Novi Sad, a member of the Board of the Belgrade documentary film festival Beldocs and a member of the Board of the Serbian Film Center.

Born in Belgrade, Dubravka graduated in journalism at the Faculty of Political Sciences, University of Belgrade in 1983, she started her career in 1982 on Radio Belgrade. From 1995 to 1997, she worked in RTV Politika where she was the creator of a film show called "In Media Res", and from 2000 to 2004 another called "Kino-Klub".

== International career ==
Aside from her film criticism, she has been a member of the FIPRESCI award jury at the Cannes, Berlin, Venice, San Sebastian and Thessaloniki film festivals.

== Festivals ==
In Serbia, she is known as the founder of the European concept program of the Palić Film Festival, where she was a selector (2005, 2006 and 2007) and founded the Tolerance Award for the Best Film of Eastern Europe. She was a long-time member of the Board of FEST, and founder of the Eritrocit Award for the best European film.

== Bibliography ==
- Monografija 35. FEST, FEST, Belgrade, 1995
- FILM&VIDEO Studije Polemike Ogledi Razgovori, Belgrade, 1997
- Uvećanje - Majstori moderne režije, Institut za film/Prometej, Novi Sad, 1998
- Introducing Youth, FCS, Belgrade, 2008
- Goran Paskalević, 50. TFIF, Thessaloniki, 2009
- Dorota Keđežavska: poljska rediteljka i pisac, CCIFF, Novi Sad, 2011
- Andreas Drezen: nemački reditelj, CCIFF, Novi Sad, 2012

== Awards ==
In 1998 Dubravka Lakić was awarded the Golden badge of the Cultural and Educational Community of Serbia for her contribution to Serbian cinematography, and she won the Golden "Beočug" (2002).
