= Shake, Rattle and Roll 12 =

2010 Filipino film

- Theatrical release poster
- Directed by: Zoren Legaspi (segment "Mamanyiika"); Topel Lee (segment "Isla"); Jerrold Tarog (segment "Punerarya")
- Screenplay by: Aloy Adlawan (segments "Mamanyiika", "Isla" and "Punerarya"); Maribel Ilag (segment "Mamanyiika"); Jules Katanyag (segment "Isla"); Rona Lean Sales (segment "Punerarya")
- Produced by: Roselle Monteverde-Teo; Lily Y. Monteverde
- Starring: Carla Abellana; Shaina Magdayao; Andi Eigenmann; Rayver Cruz; Sid Lucero; Ricky Davao; Jackie Lou Blanco; Regine Angeles; Martin Escudero; Nash Aguas; Elijah Alejo; Anna Vicente; John Lapus; Rita Avila; Malou Crisologo; Kristel Moreno; Niña Jose; John Feir; Gaby dela Merced
- Cinematography: Mackie Galvez (segment "Punerarya"); Luis Quirino (segments "Mamanyiika" and "Isla")
- Edited by: Renewin Alano
- Music by: Von de Guzman (segments "Mamanyiika" and "Isla"); Jerrold Tarog (segment "Punerarya")
- Production companies: Regal Entertainment; Regal Multimedia Inc.
- Release date: December 25, 2010
- Running time: 124 minutes
- Country: Philippines
- Language: Filipino
- Box office: ₱60 million

Shake, Rattle and Roll 12 is a 2010 Filipino horror anthology film produced by Regal Entertainment, and the twelfth installment of the Shake, Rattle & Roll film series, following the eleventh film in 2009. It is directed by Zoren Legaspi, Topel Lee and Jerrold Tarog. The film stars an ensemble cast including Carla Abellana, Shaina Magdayao, Andi Eigenmann, John Lapus, Rayver Cruz, Sid Lucero, Ricky Davao, Jackie Lou Blanco, Rita Avila, Malou Crisologo, Regine Angeles, Martin Escudero, Nash Aguas, Elijah Alejo, Anna Vicente, Kristel Moreno, Niña Jose, John Feir, and Gaby Dela Merced. It was distributed by Regal Entertainment and Regal Multimedia, and was an official entry in the 2010 Metro Manila Film Festival. The thirteenth installment, Shake, Rattle & Roll 13, was released in 2011.

The film consists of three stories: a family is terrorized by a possessed doll; visitors to an island encounter a group of engkanto; and a tutor discovers that the household she works for and their staff are aswang.

This is the first appearance of Rita Avila in Regal after her service to her former home studio Seiko Films and to Viva Films, only 1 year after the first appearance of Sharon Cuneta in Regal for Mano Po 6: A Mother's Love in 2009. It is also the last film appearance of actor John Apacible, who died in a shooting incident in Quezon City, Diliman on March 20, 2011, at the age of 38.

== Plot ==
=== "Mamanyiika" ===
After a serious fight, Abel was incapacitated by a passing car while his wife Gail was killed in a hit-and-run accident, leaving Abel widowed with his two children, Ara and Abigail.

A few years later, after a visit to their mother's grave, Abigail picks up an old doll in a nearby barrow. A suspicious Ara demands her sister to throw it away. This culminates in a fight, where the doll comes to life and comforts Abigail, who believes that Gail's spirit possessed the doll.

Traumatized after being assaulted by the doll, Ara destroys it as Abigail watches. Abel, deciding that this is the final straw for Ara, orders the doll to be disposed of in the creek. Soon, the doll kills two garbage men and returns to Abigail's house, seeking vengeance against her after she receives a new set of dolls from her father.

It is revealed that the doll used to belong to Dorothy Cruz, a woman who went insane after losing her child.

One night, the doll attacks the family, with Ara gaining the upper hand. Provoked by the doll imitating her mother's voice, Ara shoots the doll with her father's shotgun after it tries to kill Abigail. Some time later, the doll is seen with a pair of homeless children.

=== "Isla" ===
A lost girl is separated from her friends while on a vacation. She is incapacitated by an unknown entity, which transforms her into an unrecognizable form.

Andrea is accompanied by her friends Ces and Belle on vacation in a remote island. Upon setting foot, rumors circulate that a man named Ray had lost his girlfriend during a holiday in the very same place. Dismissing the hearsay, the trio spend the night with a bonfire. Ces, who has a knowledge of the occult, performs a ritual to help the brokenhearted Andrea find the man for her.

Tensions rise as the disappearance of Andrea startles the group, with their friend reappearing in the morning with muddy feet. It is revealed that Andrea was led by fairies (called the "lambanas") into a cave and was offered delicious food by an engkanto as well as asking her to stay and offering to give her everything she wants if she decides to do so. Counseled by a witch doctor, Malay, Andrea is the next target of the engkanto, whom Malay said was the king of the isle. Afterwards, they met Ray himself.

A group of fairies attack the group's cottage, killing Belle and Ces. The engkanto captures Andrea, with Ray and Malay in hot pursuit. In the end, Malay is killed, but Ray manages to overpower the engkanto, saving Andrea's life.

Andrea wakes up aboard a boat with Ray; however, she notices that the boat is not moving away from the island. It is revealed that it was just an illusion and that Andrea is still in the engkanto's cave with the engkanto as "Ray".

=== "Punerarya" ===
Dianne works as a part-time tutor for the Gonzales family, the owners of a funeral parlor said to be the lair of rumored aswangs.

On her first day, she meets the patriarch Carlo, the children - Ryan and Sarah, butlers Aludia and Simeon, and the secretary Anna. After a series of successful tutorial sessions, it gradually became clear to Dianne the nature of the family: being photophobic, having a desire for entrails and other unusual activity in and out of the parlor.

Dennis, Dianne's brother, dismisses his sister's stories; meanwhile, Ryan is accused of divulging the truth to Dianne, creating tension between Carlo and Dianne.

The family lures Dennis, who was waiting for his sister outside. Unknown to him, he was used as a bait to force Diane to continue her work, but at the same time, sacrificing her life as prey to the aswangs. Carlo then revealed that they were once part of an ancient tribe, whose homes were ravaged by fire. Desperate, a widowed Carlo, being widowed set up the funeral parlor to cover up their true nature and to earn a living. This explained their photophobic features and dismissing Dianne before sundown.

Dianne confronts the group, demanding they surrender Dennis. Throwing formaldehyde and setting the parlor aflame as a diversion, Dianne and her brother narrowly escape Sarah and Carlo, while Ryan, the only aswang member of the family that refuses to harm anyone, begs to go with her. Left with no choice, Dianne brings Ryan home, as the funeral parlor burns to the ground.

As Dianne finds the first-aid kit to treat Dennis, she overhears his screams. She rushes to the den and finds Ryan eating Dennis' entrails. Ryan reveals that his family only eats living humans on their birthdays and just eats entrails from corpses to survive every day. However, Ryan wanted more and prefers to eat living humans every day. Dianne realizes that she was used by Ryan so that he can get rid of his family and their restrictions as he attacks her.

== Cast ==
=== Mamanyiika ===
- Shaina Magdayao as Ara
- Ricky Davao† as Abel
- Malou Crisologo as Yaya Miley
- Rita Avila as Dorothy Cruz
- Jackie Lou Blanco as Gail
- Elijah Alejo as Abigail
- John Feir as Fermin
- Carmina Villarroel as Head Nurse
- Jed Madela as Garbage Man 1
- John Apacible† as Garbage Man 2

=== Isla ===
- Andi Eigenmann as Andrea
- Rayver Cruz as Ray
- John Lapus as Malay
- Niña Jose as Ray's girlfriend
- Regine Angeles as Belle
- Kristel Moreno as Ces
- Solo Kiggins as Jok
- Richard Quan as Domeng

=== Punerarya ===
- Carla Abellana as Dianne
- Sid Lucero as Carlo
- Nash Aguas as Ryan
- Martin Escudero as Dennis
- Gaby Dela Merced as Anna
- Odette Khan as Aludia
- Jess Evardone as Simeon
- Anna Vicente as Sarah
- Dido dela Paz as Rolly
- Mercedes Cabral as pregnant woman
- Althea Vega as Nova

== Reception ==
=== Box office ===
By the end of the festival, the film grossed ₱60 million.

=== Critical response ===
Althea Lauren Ricardo of The Freeman gave the film a rating of 7 out of 10 (70%) stating that while it continued the traditional 3-in-1 format, it was "infused with a dash of indie spirit". The second episode - Isla - was described as the "weirdest segment in the trio" due to how its scenes were put together.

== Accolades ==
Award	Category	Recipient	Result
36th Metro Manila Film Festival	Best Actress	Carla Abellana	Nominated

== See also ==
- Shake, Rattle & Roll (film series)
- List of ghost films
