= Jerrold Tarog =

Filipino film director and screenwriter (born 1977)

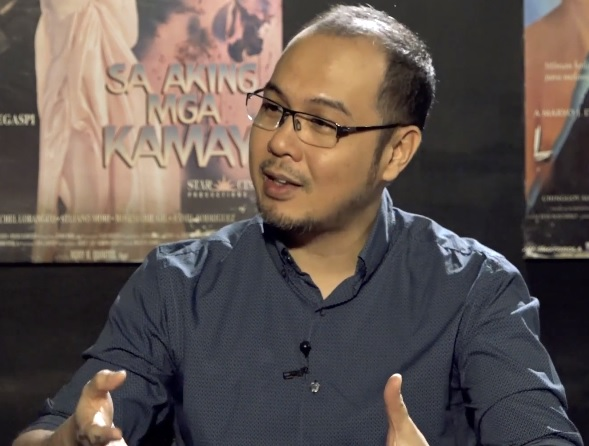
- Tarog on November 19, 2019
- Born: Jerrold Viacrucis Tarog; May 30, 1977 (age 49); Manila, Philippines
- Other names: Ramon Ukit; Pats R. Ranyo; Roger "TJ" Ladro; David Barril
- Education: University of the Philippines Los Baños (withdrew); University of the Philippines Diliman; International Academy of Film and Television
- Occupations: Film director; screenwriter; producer; editor; composer
- Years active: 2002–present
- Website: jerroldtarog.com

Jerrold Viacrucis Tarog (/dʒɛˈrɒld/; born May 30, 1977) is a Filipino film director, screenwriter, producer, editor, and composer. He is best known for directing Heneral Luna (2015), Bliss (2017) and Goyo: The Boy General (2018). His first feature film was the independently-produced Confessional (2007), followed by Mangatyanan (2009) and Sana Dati (2013). He also directed segments for the Shake, Rattle & Roll film series.

== Early life and education ==
Jerrold Tarog was born in Manila on May 30, 1977, and grew up in Dapdap St. CERIS 1, Canlubang, Laguna. He is the only child of Jose, an Overseas Filipino Worker from Bicol, and Aurora, who hails from Leyte. Tarog learned to play the drum at age six, and the piano at age seven.

Tarog went to elementary school at Mary Help of Christians School (Now Mary Help of Christians College - Salesian Sisters INC. in Canlubang, Calamba City and for highschool was accepted and graduated from the University of the Philippines Rural High School in Los Baños, Laguna for his primary education, and spent two years in the University of the Philippines Los Baños studying agribusiness management for his higher education. After flunking all subjects in the agribusiness course, he changed his major and transferred to the University of the Philippines Diliman, where he was a scholar and graduated from the university's College of Music school with a degree in music composition. He briefly attended the International Academy of Film and Television in Cebu City.

== Career ==
While a student at the UP Diliman, Tarog developed an interest in filmmaking and began taking film classes at the UP Film Center, which is located near the College of Music building. He recalled watching classic films that were directed by Akira Kurosawa, Martin Scorsese and Woody Allen. After graduation, Tarog played the drums for a heavy metal band.

In his early filmmaking career, Tarog assumed different names on separate occasions. As a screenwriter he was Ramon Ukit, (Note: Jerrold Tarog is credited as screenwriter under the pseudonym Ramon Ukit and as editor under Pats R. Ranyo in Carpool, Confessional, Mangatyanan, and Sana Dati.) a Filipinized name of his favorite American fiction writer Raymond Carver. As an editor he was Pats R. Ranyo, an anagram of the character he played in his own film Confessional, Ryan Pastor. As a sound designer he was Roger "TJ" Ladro, (Note: Apart from being the composer, Jerrold Tarog is also credited as sound designer under the pseudonym Roger "TJ" Ladro in Confessional, Astig, Mangatyanan, and Sana Dati.) an anagram of his complete name. He has called his filmmaking expertise "self-taught".

=== 2000s ===
In 2002, he landed a job as a musical director of the film Agimat starring Bong Revilla Jr. Subsequently, he worked for independent film director Dante Mendoza to compose the score in his films Masahista (2005), Manoro (2006), Tirador and Foster Child (both in 2007). His score for Masahista earned him a Young Critics Circle award for Best Achievement in Aural Orchestration in 2005.

In 2006 Tarog began his directorial debut in a short film entitled Carpool, which he also wrote and edited. The following year he directed his first feature film, Confessional, a political thriller mockumentary shot in Cebu City; he starred in it assuming the name David Barril. The film was the first installment in what Tarog has dubbed the Camera trilogy, explaining: "It's three films wherein the protagonist in each movie has a camera, and it's about the contrast of life and truth in front of the camera and behind it. The stories of the movies are different from each other, they're not related, and they just have common plot elements." It garnered a total of five awards at the 24th Star Awards for Movies, two of which were given to Tarog—Digital Movie Director (shared with co-director Ruel Antipuesto) and Digital Original Movie Screenplay. In 2009 he directed the drama film Mangatyanan (also known as The Blood Trail), starring Irma Adlawan, and was the second installment in the Camera trilogy. The film was an entry to the 2009 Cinemalaya Philippine Independent Film Festival where it won the Best Production Design award.

=== 2010s ===
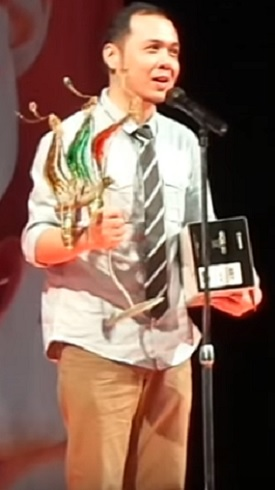
Tarog on August 4, 2013

In 2010, Tarog directed Senior Year, a coming-of-age romantic drama film which tells the story of ten high school students during their final year in a private school in Manila. The film was partly inspired by Tarog's experience as a music student at the UP Diliman. The same year he was tapped by Regal Entertainment to direct a segment in Shake, Rattle and Roll 12, the twelfth installment in the Shake, Rattle & Roll horror anthology franchise, which marked Tarog's transition to mainstream Philippine cinema; his segment is entitled "Punerarya".

In 2011, Tarog directed Aswang, a remake of Peque Gallaga's 1992 horror film of the same name, which stars Lovi Poe, Paulo Avelino, and Albie Casiño among others. The same year he directed another segment in the Shake, Rattle and Roll franchise in its thirteenth sequel Shake, Rattle & Roll 13, entitled "Parola". The following year he served as composer in the fourteenth installment Shake, Rattle and Roll Fourteen: The Invasion, and returned to direct a segment in the fifteenth installment Shake, Rattle & Roll XV entitled "Ulam" the following year. In 2013, Tarog collaborated the second time with Lovi Poe in Sana Dati (also known as If Only), in which Poe starred opposite Paulo Avelino, who have also previously worked together in Aswang. The romantic drama film (the last installment in the Camera trilogy) was an entry to the 2013 Cinemalaya Film Festival where it garnered seven awards during the festival's Awards Night, of which Tarog won Best Director.

In 2015 Tarog co-wrote, directed, edited and scored Heneral Luna, a historical biographical film which chronicled the leadership of General Antonio Luna of the Philippine Revolutionary Army during the Philippine–American War. The film was a commercial success in the Philippines, having earned ₱256 million nationwide (about three times its production costs). The film garnered praise for its cinematography, writing, acting and plot, as well as critical acclaim from Filipino professional critics and historians alike. It has since been regarded as the most expensive Philippine historical epic film ever made. The Philippine edition of Esquire considered Heneral Luna as Tarog's breakthrough film due to its successful run.

In 2017, Tarog wrote, directed, edited and scored Bliss, a psychological thriller film starring Iza Calzado. Tarog pitched the idea for the film right after Heneral Luna's Philippine commercial release and was accepted. It took him roughly three to four months to write the screenplay, and three weeks to score it. The film competed in Japan at the 12th Osaka Asian Film Festival from March 3 to 12, 2017, and received critical acclaim during its run. Calzado received the festival's Yakushi Pearl Award for Best Performer.

=== Prospective films ===
In December 2016, Tarog announced that he and screenwriter Jade Castro had been developing a screenplay for an adaptation of Arnold Arre's The Mythology Class, to which he said that "hopefully [it] materializes". Plans for an adaptation of the graphic novel was first made by Tarog in October 2015 after a successful pitch meeting to the producers of Heneral Luna, and Castro was already onboard as co-writer. He has envisioned the film as being divided into two cinematic parts. Tarog has praised The Mythology Class, saying it "remains potent and exhilarating" since its first publication in 1999, as well as complimenting Arre as someone whose "imagination and creativity soar to dizzying heights." Owing to its success, he hired Arre and his wife to design the poster for his film Senior Year.

In October 2018, Tarog was announced to replace Erik Matti as the director of Star Cinema's film adaptation of Darna, which is based on the eponymous comic-book superheroine created by Mars Ravelo. The film began principal photography on January 19, 2020.

== Personal life ==
Tarog has cited Se7en, Taxi Driver, The Silence of the Lambs, and Bullets over Broadway as some of his favorite films, and The Wire, Breaking Bad, and Freaks and Geeks as his favorite television shows. He credited Filipino films Crying Ladies and Tanging Yaman as influences in filmmaking, although he had admitted not being a patron of Filipino films as a college student. Tarog is a fan of film scores composed by Alfred Hitchcock's frequent collaborator Bernard Hermann.

Tarog is nonreligious, but has said that he does "trust evidence, reason and the broadening of knowledge".

== Filmography ==
Key
†	Denotes films that have not yet been released

Film credits of Tarog
Title	Year	Functioned as					Notes	Ref(s)
Title	Year	Director	Writer	Editor	Producer	Composer	Notes	Ref(s)
Agimat	2002					Yes		
Lupe	2004					Yes		
Masahista	2005					Yes	Also known as The Masseur	
Manoro	2006					Yes	Also known as The Teacher	
Kaleldo	2006					Yes	Also known as Summer Heat	
Carpool	2006	Yes	Yes	Yes		Yes	Short film Directorial debut	
Tirador	2007					Yes	Also known as Slingshot	
Kadin	2007					Yes		
Foster Child	2007					Yes	Also known as John-John in France	
Confessional	2007	Yes	Yes	Yes		Yes	Directed with Ruel Antipuesto; Score composed with Arodasi	
Astig	2007	Yes	Yes	Yes		Yes	Spin-off short film of Confessional	
Mangatyanan	2009	Yes	Yes	Yes		Yes	Also known as The Blood Trail	
Senior Year	2010	Yes	Yes	Yes		Yes	Also sound designer	
Faculty	2010	Yes	Yes	Yes		Yes	Short film Also sound designer	
Emir	2010			Yes				
Ang Damgo ni Eleuteria	2010					Yes		
Shake, Rattle and Roll 12	2010	Yes				Yes	Segment: "Punerarya"	
Niño	2011					Yes		
Aswang	2011	Yes	Yes			Yes		
Shake, Rattle & Roll 13	2011	Yes	Yes			Yes	Segment: "Parola"	
Eksena sa Gubat	2011	Yes	Yes	Yes		Yes	Short film Spin-off for Sana Dati	
Sun Dance	2012	Yes	Yes	Yes		Yes	Short film	
Agusan Marsh Diaries	2012	Yes	Yes	Yes		Yes	Documentary film Also sound designer	
Aparisyon	2012			Yes			Edited with Vincent Sandoval	
The Healing	2012			Yes		Yes		
Shake, Rattle and Roll Fourteen: The Invasion	2012					Yes	Composed with Carmina Cuya and Von de Guzman	
Sana Dati	2013	Yes	Yes	Yes	Yes	Yes	Also known as If Only; Produced with Jose Mari Abacan and Daphne Chiu	
Pagpag: Siyam na Buhay	2013			Yes				
Shake, Rattle & Roll XV	2014	Yes	Yes	Yes		Yes	Segment: "Ulam"; Written with Zig Marasigan; edited with Ben Tolentino	
Heneral Luna	2015	Yes	Yes	Yes		Yes		
Buy Now, Die Later	2015					Yes		
Angelito	2017	Yes					Short film	
I'm Drunk, I Love You	2017					Yes		
Bliss	2017	Yes	Yes	Yes		Yes		
Goyo: Ang Batang Heneral	2018	Yes	Yes					
Write About Love	2019					Yes		
Shake, Rattle & Roll Extreme	2023	Yes	Yes	Yes			Segment: “Mukbang”	
Quezon	2025	Yes	Yes	Yes		Yes		
Knock Three Times †	TBD	Yes						
The Sacrifice †	TBD		Yes					

== Awards and nominations ==
Awards and nominations received by Tarog
Award-giving body	Date of ceremony	Film	Director	Category	Result	Notes	Ref(s)
Young Critics Circle	2005	Masahista	Brillante Mendoza	Best Achievement in Aural Orchestration	Won		
Cinemalaya Philippine Independent Film Festival	July 29, 2007	Kadin	Adolfo Alix Jr.	Best Original Music Score	Won		
Cinema One Originals	December 1, 2007	Confessional	Jerrold Tarog	Best Director	Won	Shared with co-director Ruel Antipuesto	
Cinema One Originals	December 1, 2007	Confessional	Jerrold Tarog	Best Sound Design	Won	Received as Roger "TJ" Ladro	
Cinema One Originals	December 1, 2007	Confessional	Jerrold Tarog	Best Editor	Won	Received as Pats R. Ranyo	
Cinema One Originals	December 1, 2007	Confessional	Jerrold Tarog	Best Actor	Nominated	Received as David Barill	
Gawad Urian	2007	Kaleldo	Brillante Mendoza	Best Music	Nominated		
Gawad Urian	2007	Kubrador	Brillante Mendoza	Best Music	Nominated		
Gawad Urian	2007	Manoro	Brillante Mendoza	Best Music	Nominated		
Gawad Urian	2008	Confessional	Jerrold Tarog	Best Director	Nominated		
Gawad Urian	2008	Confessional	Jerrold Tarog	Best Screenplay	Nominated	Received as Ramon Ukit	
Gawad Urian	2008	Confessional	Jerrold Tarog	Best Actor	Nominated	Received as David Barill	
Gawad Urian	2008	Confessional	Jerrold Tarog	Best Editing	Nominated	Received as Pats R. Ranyo	
Gawad Urian	2008	Confessional	Jerrold Tarog	Best Sound	Nominated		
FAMAS Award	December 2, 2008	Confessional	Jerrold Tarog	Best Screenplay	Nominated	Received as Ramon Ukit	
FAMAS Award	December 2, 2008	Confessional	Jerrold Tarog	Best Editing	Nominated		
Gawad Urian	May 18, 2011	Ang Damgo ni Eleuteria	Adolf Alix Jr.	Best Music	Nominated		
Luna Award	July 10, 2011	Emir	Chito S. Roño	Best Editing	Won		
Young Critics Circle	December 6, 2011	Shake, Rattle and Roll 12: "Punerarya"	Jerrold Tarog	Best Film	Nominated		
Young Critics Circle	December 6, 2011	Shake, Rattle and Roll 12: "Punerarya"	Jerrold Tarog	Best Achievement in Sound and Aural Orchestration	Won	Shared with sound designer Lambert Casas Jr.	
Young Critics Circle	December 6, 2011	Ang Damgo ni Eleuteria	Remton Zuasola	Best Original Score	Nominated		
Gawad Urian	June 13, 2012	Niño	Loy Arcenas	Best Music	Nominated		
Young Critics Circle	June 27, 2012	Niño	Loy Arcenas	Best Achievement in Sound and Aural Orchestration	Nominated		
Cinemalaya Philippine Independent Film Festival	August 4, 2013	Sana Dati	Jerrold Tarog	Best Director	Won		
Cinemalaya Philippine Independent Film Festival	August 4, 2013	Sana Dati	Jerrold Tarog	Best Editing	Won	Received as Pats R. Ranyo	
Cinemalaya Philippine Independent Film Festival	August 4, 2013	Sana Dati	Jerrold Tarog	Best Original Music Score	Won		
Cinemalaya Philippine Independent Film Festival	August 4, 2013	Sana Dati	Jerrold Tarog	Best Sound	Won	Received as Roger "TJ" Ladro	
Young Critics Circle	September 3, 2013	Aparisyon	Vincent Sandoval	Best Achievement in Editing	Nominated		
Young Critics Circle	February 2014	Pagpag: Siyam na Buhay	Frasco S. Mortiz	Best Achievement in Editing	Won		
Metro Manila Film Festival	December 27, 2015	Buy Now, Die Later	Randolph Longjas	Best Musical Score	Nominated		
PMPC Star Awards for Movies	March 6, 2016	Heneral Luna	Jerrold Tarog	Movie Director of the Year	Nominated		
PMPC Star Awards for Movies	March 6, 2016	Heneral Luna	Jerrold Tarog	Movie Screenwriter of the Year	Nominated	Shared with co-writers Henry Francia and E.A. Rocha	
PMPC Star Awards for Movies	March 6, 2016	Heneral Luna	Jerrold Tarog	Movie Editor of the Year	Won		
PMPC Star Awards for Movies	March 6, 2016	Heneral Luna	Jerrold Tarog	Movie Musical Scorer of the Year	Won		
Gawad Urian	June 22, 2016	Heneral Luna	Jerrold Tarog	Best Director	Won		
Gawad Urian	June 22, 2016	Heneral Luna	Jerrold Tarog	Best Editing	Won		
Gawad Urian	June 22, 2016	Heneral Luna	Jerrold Tarog	Best Screenplay	Nominated	Shared with co-writers Henry Francia and E.A Rocha	
Gawad Urian	June 22, 2016	Heneral Luna	Jerrold Tarog	Best Editing	Won		
Gawad Urian	June 22, 2016	Heneral Luna	Jerrold Tarog	Best Music	Nominated		
Luna Award	September 18, 2016	Heneral Luna	Jerrold Tarog	Best Director	Won		
Luna Award	September 18, 2016	Heneral Luna	Jerrold Tarog	Best Screenplay	Won	Shared with co-writers Henry Francia and E.A Rocha	
Luna Award	September 18, 2016	Heneral Luna	Jerrold Tarog	Best Editing	Won		
Luna Award	September 18, 2016	Heneral Luna	Jerrold Tarog	Best Musical Scoring	Won		

== See also ==
- Cinema of the Philippines
