= Confessional (film) =

Mockumentary indie film

- Directed by: Jerrold Tarog; Ruel Dahis Antipuesto
- Written by: Ramon Ukit (Note: Jerrold Tarog is credited as screenwriter under the pseudonym Ramon Ukit, and as editor under Pats R. Ranyo.)
- Produced by: Ronald Arguelles; Ruel Dahis Antipuesto
- Starring: Publio Briones III; David Barril; Greg Fernandez; Donna Gimeno; Owee Salva; Jai Rabin
- Cinematography: Ruel Dahis Antipuesto
- Edited by: Pats R. Ranyo
- Music by: Roger "TJ" Ladro; Arodasi
- Production companies: Cinema One Originals; Oddfield Productions; Creative Programs
- Distributed by: Creative Programs
- Release date: November 30, 2007
- Running time: 90 minutes
- Country: Philippines
- Language: Cebuano

Confessional is a 2007 mockumentary indie film by Jerrold Tarog and Ruel Dahis Antipuesto. It won Best Film in the First Features Section of 10th Osian Festival of Asian and Arab Cinema in New Delhi.

== Plot ==
On a trip to Cebu to document the Sinulog Festival, Ryan Pastor meets Lito Caliso, an erring politician, who confesses to Ryan's camera all the crimes he committed while in office.

== Cast ==
- David Barril as Ryan Pastor
- Publio Briones III as Lito Caliso
- Greg Fernandez as Miguel
- Donna Gimeno as Miguel's Wife
- Owee Salva as Monet Silva
- Paola Aseron as Kathy Escueta
- Jude Bacalso as Jhae Zaspa
- Bambi Beltran as Sister Ana Maria Teresa
- Archie Modequillo as Marcus
- Jay Roderick Rabin as Undo
- Ruel Rigor as Prof. Romulo Albaracin

== Awards ==
10th Osian Festival of Asian and Arab Cinema

- Best Film - Confessional

Cinema One Originals

- Best Picture - Confessional
- Best Director - Jerrold Tarog and Ruel Dahis Antipuesto
- Best Screenplay - Ramon Ukit (a.k.a. Jerrold Tarog)
- Best Editing - Pats R. Ranyo (a.k.a. Jerrold Tarog)
- Best Supporting Actor - Publio Briones III
- Best Sound - Roger "TJ" Ladro (a.k.a. Jerrold Tarog)
- Star Cinema Special Award

24th PMPC STAR AWARDS

- Best Film (Digital Category) - Confessional
- Best Director - Jerrold Tarog and Ruel Dahis Antipuesto
- Best Screenplay - Ramon Ukit (a.k.a. Jerrold Tarog)
- Best Editing - Pats R. Ranyo (a.k.a. Jerrold Tarog)
- Best Sound - Roger "TJ" Ladro (a.k.a. Jerrold Tarog)

56th FAMAS Awards (2008)

- Best Theme Song (Winner) - "Sine-Sine" by Missing Filemon

== See also ==
- Cinema of the Philippines
