= Timeline of the Philippine Revolution =

This is the timeline of the Philippine Revolution—the uprising that gave birth to Asia's first republic. The roots of the revolution trace back to the Cavite mutiny and subsequent execution of Gomburza in 1872, and ended with the declaration of independence from Spain in 1898.

== Timeline ==
=== 1872 ===
  - January 20: Cavite mutiny. Filipino soldiers stationed at Fort San Felipe staged an uprising.
  - February 17: In the aftermath of the mutiny, the Gomburza were publicly executed as alleged conspirators of the Cavite conspiracy despite lack of evidence.
- 14 November 1875 – Gregorio Del Pilar, one of youngest general in the revolution, was born in Bulacan.
- 15 December 1875 – Emilio Jacinto, the "Brain of Katipunan" was born in Tondo, Manila.
- 22 July 1878 – Sulu recognizes Spanish sovereignty.
- 18–20 July 1880 – Two earthquakes rock Luzon.
- 3 March 1882 – Jose Rizal leaves the Philippines to continue his medicine studies in Spain at the Universidad Central de Madrid.
- 2 June 1882 – Rizal begins writing his novel Noli Me Tangere in Madrid.
- 1 July 1882 – Diariong Tagalog, the first Spanish–Tagalog newspaper begins publication.
- 21 June 1884 – Rizal finishes his medical studies in Spain, earning a licentiate in medicine.
- 21 February 1887 – Rizal finished writing the Noli Me Tangere.
- 29 May 1887 – Noli Me Tangere was published in Madrid and Barcelona.
- 13 December 1888 – Filipino expatriates in Spain, among them Jose Rizal, Marcelo del Pilar, Antonio Luna and Mariano Ponce established the organization La Solidaridad. The group aims to foster closer relationships with Spain and the Philippines.
- 12 January 1889 – La Asociacion Hispano-Filipino was created. The organization is composed of Filipinos and some peninsulares led by Miguel Morayta. Its aim was to influence public opinion to initiate reforms in the Philippines.
- 15 February 1889 – The first issue of La Solidaridad was published in Barcelona.
- 28 March 1891 – Rizal finished writing El Filibusterismo, the sequel of Noli Me Tangere in Biarritz, France.
- 1 January 1892 – The Katipunan idea was conceived.
- 26 June 1892 – Rizal arrives in the Philippines via Hong Kong.
- 3 July 1892 – Shortly after his arrival, Rizal established the reformist society, La Liga Filipina.
- 6 July 1892 – Spanish authorities arrested Rizal for organizing La Liga Filipina.
- 7 July 1892 – The Katipunan was established.
- 7 July 1892 – A decree was issued deporting Rizal to Dapitan, Zamboanga del Norte.
- 17 July 1892 – Rizal was exiled to Dapitan.
- 16 April 1893 – The Grand Lodge of Philippine Masonry was founded.
- 8 June 1894 – A Royal decree stops the issuance of passports to Filipinos.
- 1 January 1895 – Emilio Aguinaldo becomes a Mason and is elected Capitan Municipal of Kawit, Cavite.
- 24 February 1895 – Cuba revolts against Spain.
- 25 May 1895 – Governor-General Ramon Blanco orders the deportation of prominent citizens of Malolos, Bulacan.
- 15 November 1895 – La Solidaridad ceases its publication due to lack of funds.
- 1 July 1896 – Rizal receives a telegram from the Governor-General requiring his services as a physician for the Spanish army in Cuba.
- 4 July 1896 – Marcelo del Pilar dies of tuberculosis in Barcelona. His remains were repatriated later in 1920.
- 6 August 1896 – Rizal returns to Manila.
- 19 August 1896 – Katipunan was discovered after Teodoro Patiño reveals it to Fr. Mariano Gil, an Augustinian priest.
- 21 August 1896 – Andres Bonifacio creates a new secret Katipunan code.
- 23 August 1896 – Members of the Katipunan gathered in the house of Juan Ramos, the son of Melchora Aquino. In this house, the revolutionaries tore their cedulas as a symbol of their determination and defiance. This event would be later known as the Cry of Pugad Lawin.

=== 1896 ===
- 24 August 1896 – Bonifacio and his men escape to the house of Melchora Aquino to evade the pursuing Spanish civil guards.
- 28 August 1896 – Bonifacio issues a manifesto urging the Filipinos to take up arms against the Spaniards.
- 29 August 1896 – Melchora Aquino was arrested by the Spaniards for aiding the revolutionaries.
- 30 August 1896 – Battle of San Juan del Monte.
- 30 August 1896 – Governor-General Blanco proclaims a state of war in eight rebel provinces, placing the provinces of Manila, Laguna, Cavite, Batangas, Pampanga, Bulacan, Tarlac and Nueva Ecija under martial law.
- 30 August 1896 – Melchora is transferred to Bilibid Prison.
- 31 August 1896 – Filipino revolutionaries led by Mariano Trias attacked the tribunal of San Francisco de Malabon.
- 2 September 1896 – Filipino General Mariano Llanera took arms against the Spaniards in Nueva Ecija.
- 2 September 1896 – Melchora was deported to Guam along with 171 Filipino deportees.
- 4 September 1896 – Four revolutionaries are executed in Luneta.
- 5 September 1896 – Battle of Imus.
- 12 September 1896 – The 13 martyrs of Cavite are executed.
- 16 September 1896 – Twenty-two prominent residents of Manila are imprisoned.
- 1 October 1896 – The first reinforcements from Spain arrive in Manila.
- 3 October 1896 – Rizal arrives in Barcelona.
- 4 October 1896 – Rizal was incarcerated in Castelle de Montjuic. He was on his way to Cuba for a volunteer medical mission when he was imprisoned under the orders of Governor-General Eulogio Despujol.
- 6 October 1896 – Rizal was sent back to the Philippines as a prisoner.
- 25 October 1896 – Governor-General Blanco included Zambales, Bataan and Sibugay provinces under the state of war.
- 31 October 1896 – The Magdalo, a faction of the Katipunan was formed under the leadership of Baldomero Aguinaldo.
- 3 November 1896 – Rizal was imprisoned in Fort Santiago.
- 9 November 1896 – Battle of Binakayan-Dalahican.
- 30 November 1896 – Julio Nakpil composes "Marangal na Dalit ng Katagalugan", meant to be the national anthem of the Tagalog Republic.
- 13 December 1896 – Gen. Camilio de Polavieja replaces Ramon Blanco as the Governor-General of the Philippines.
- 30 December 1896 – Rizal was executed in Luneta Park.
- 31 December 1896 – Magdalo and Magdiwang factions of the Katipunan convene to resolve disputes over leadership.

=== 1897 ===
- 4 January 1897 – Eleven Bicolano martyrs are executed.
- 11 January 1897 – The 13 martyrs of Bagumbayan are executed.
- 14 January 1897 – Governor-General Polavieja begins his military campaign by capturing Parañaque.
- 13 February 1897 – Gen. Jose Lachambre led 9, 277 troops to capture the towns of Silang, Dasmariñas, Imus, and Bacoor in Cavite.
- 17 March 1897 – Katipunan leaders adopt a flag in Naic, Cavite.
- 22 March 1897 – Tejeros Convention. Aguinaldo and Trias was elected as President and Vice-President, respectively.
- 23 March 1897 – The 19 martyrs of Aklan are executed.
- 15 April 1897 – President Aguinaldo orders the arrest of Bonifacio.
- 15 April 1897 – Governor-General Polavieja resigns due to poor health.
- 15 April 1897 – Bonifacio appoints Emilio Jacinto as the Commander in Chief of the rebel forces in the north.
- 19 April 1897 – Bonifacio establishes another government independent from Aguinaldo's revolutionary government.
- 23 April 1897 – General Camilo de Polavieja was replaced by the former governor-general of the Philippines.
- 28 April 1897 – Andres Bonifacio was arrested along with his brother Procopio in Limbon, Indang, Cavite.
- 29 April–4 May 1897 – The Bonifacio brothers are tried before the Council of War. They are pronounced guilty and sentenced to death.
- 8 May 1897 – President Aguinaldo commutes the death sentence to banishment. However, he is forced to withdraw his original decision after he was pressured by Gen. Mariano Noriel and Gen. Pio del Pilar.
- 10 May 1897 – The Bonifacio brothers are executed at Mt. Buntis, Maragondon, Cavite.
- 17 May 1897 – Governor-General Rivera issues a general amnesty to those Filipinos who surrendered to the Spanish government.
- 31 May 1897 – Aguinaldo establishes the Philippine republican government in Biak-na-Bato, San Miguel de Mayumo, Bulacan.
- 2 July 1897 – Governor-General Rivera issues a decree requiring Filipinos to have a cedula.
- 16 August 1897 – An earthquake hits Northern Luzon.
- 28 October 1897 – Aguinaldo calls an assembly to discuss their course of action.
- 1 November 1897 – The Constitution of Biak-na-Bato is signed.
