= Makiling =

Makiling may refer to:

- Maria Makiling, a goddess in Philippine mythology
- Mount Makiling, a mountain in the Philippines
- Makiling (band), a world-music band based in the Philippines
- Makiling (TV series), a Philippine television series broadcast by GMA Network
- Makiling, Calamba, an upland barangay in Calamba in the province of Laguna, Philippines
- La Forteresse de Makiling
