= Raymond Red =

Filipino filmmaker

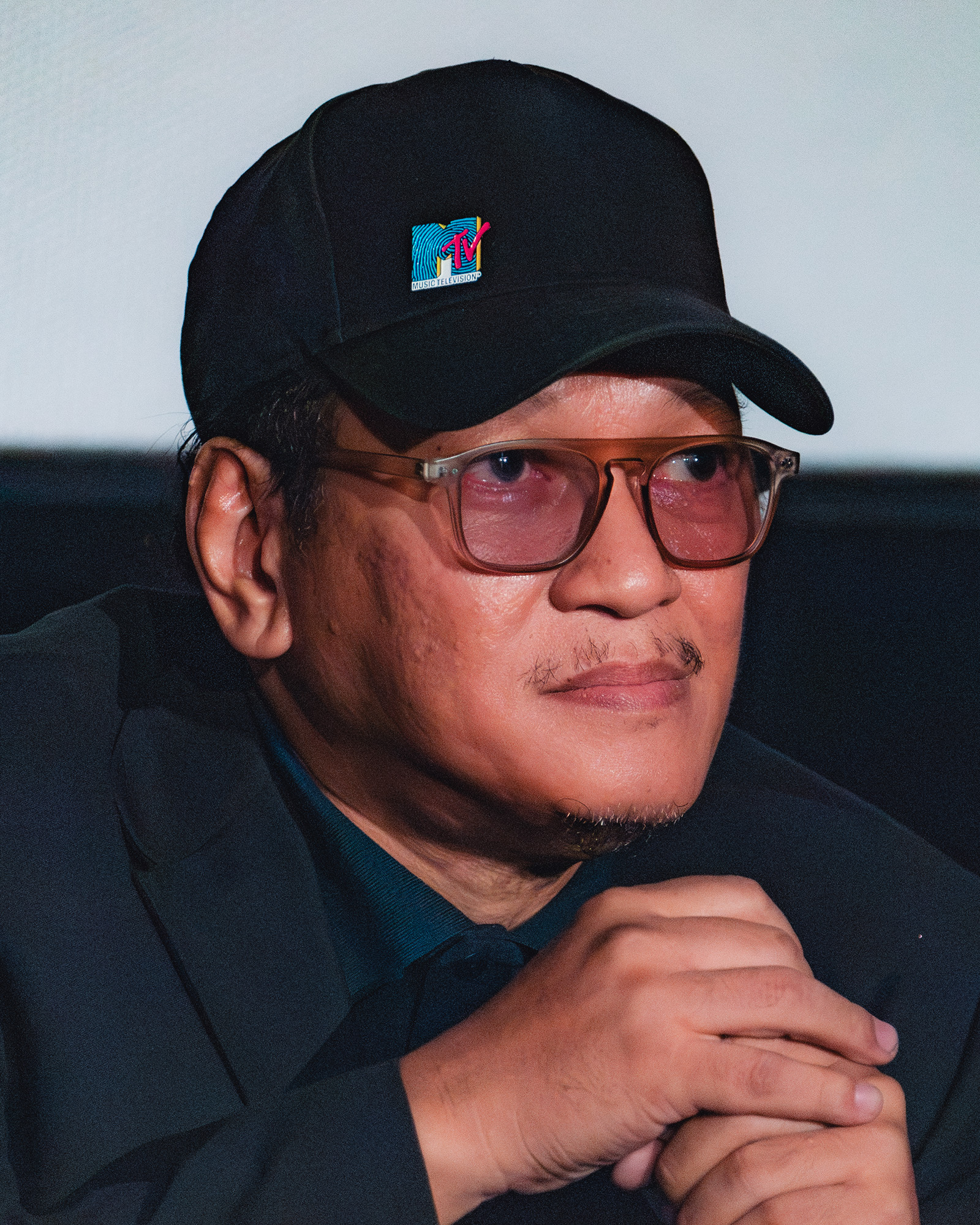
- Red in 2026
- Born: March 22, 1965 (age 61); Quezon City, Philippines
- Occupations: Film director; cinematorapher; screenwriter; editor
- Movement: Philippine New Wave
- Children: Mikhail Red; Nikolas Red
- Relatives: Jon Red (brother)

Raymond Red (born March 22, 1965) is a Filipino filmmaker. A pioneer of independent cinema in the 1980s and 1990s, he served multiple roles in the films he made, specializing in directing and cinematography. His filmography largely focused on themes of corruption, injustice, and poverty.

He has the distinction of being the first Filipino filmmaker to win the Short Film Palme d'Or award for his short film Anino at the 2000 Cannes Film Festival.

== Career ==
Raymond Red began his filmmaking career in 1983, when he directed the Super 8 mm short Ang Magpakailanman at the age of 17. Starring his older brother Jon (credited as "Jon-Jon Red"), he had intended to shoot the short in black and white, but had to settle for color film due to being cheaper than the scarce black-and-white film stock in the market. Two of the short's camerapersons, Raissa Roque and Nonoy Dadivas, were among the more prominent Filipino animators of the 1980s. Ang Magpakailanman premiered at the Wilfrido Ma. Guerrero Theater within the University of the Philippines Diliman on May 14, 1983. By 1984, Red was an assistant to cinematographer Rody Lacap.

When his short films were screened at Mowelfund, his work was praised by visiting British film scholar Tony Rayns, who stated, "There is something rare and wonderful about Raymond Red's movies, all the more piercing because it is so unexpected. The sheer beauty of these films moves me to tears"; Red later credited Rayns in influencing the path of his film career. By 1987, all of his short films were compiled for screening at the 37th Berlin International Film Festival under the International Forum of Young Cinema, and later at the 1988 San Francisco International Film Festival. In 1989, Red served as a panel member of a film seminar at the 2nd Singapore International Film Festival.

In 1992, Red directed his first feature-length film, a loose biography of Filipino revolutionary Andrés Bonifacio titled Bayani (lit. 'Hero'), which was funded by the German company ZDF. It premiered at the 42nd Berlin International Film Festival under the Forum of Young Cinema, and was later entered into two further film festivals: Vancouver and Tokyo.

In the 1990s and 2000s, Red directed several television commercials.

== Personal life ==
Red's older brother, Jon Red, is a painter-turned-filmmaker.

Red has two sons: Mikhail and Nikolas, both of whom grew up to pursue filmmaking. Mikhail is best known for directing Birdshot (2016) as well as Dead Kids (2019), the latter being the first Philippine-produced Netflix original film.

== Filmography ==
=== Feature films ===
Year	Original title	English title	Director	Writer	Cinematographer	Editor	Notes
1992	Bayani	Hero	Yes	Yes	Yes	Yes	Also sound designer
1993	Sakay		Yes	Story	Yes	Yes	
1997	Kamada	Wardrobe	Yes	No	Yes	Yes	Television film
2009	Himpapawid	Manila Skies	Yes	Yes	Yes	Yes	Also executive producer
2012	Kamera Obskura	Dark Room	Yes	Yes	Yes	Yes	Also producer
2015	Mga Rebeldeng May Kaso	Rebels with a Cause	Yes	Yes	Yes	Yes	
2022	Adarna Gang		No	No	Yes	No	Directed by his brother Jon Red
2023	Boso Dos		No	No	Yes	No	Directed by his brother Jon Red
2024	Stag		No	No	Yes	No	Directed by his brother Jon Red
2025	Lihim	Secret	No	No	Yes	No	Also camera operator. Directed by his son Mikhail Red
2025	Manila's Finest		Yes	No	Yes	No	

=== Short films ===
- 1983 - Ang Magpakailanman [English: "The Forever"]
- 1983 - Kabaka
- 1983 - Sinigang
- 1984 - Hikab [English: "The Yawn"]
- 1987 - Mistula [English: "It Seems"]
- 1988 - A Study of the Skies
- 1989 - Pepe
- 2000 - Anino [English: "Shadows"]
- 2006 - Imahe Nasyon [English: "Imagination"] (segment "Mistulang Kamera Obskura")
- 2010 - Shoot
- 2011 - Bangin [English: "Cliff"]

== Awards ==
Ceremony	Date	Film	Award	Status	Ref.
Berlin International Film Festival	1987	Bayani (English: Hero)	FAMAS Award for Best Sound	Nominated	
FAMAS Award	1993	Bayani (English: Hero)	FAMAS Award for Best Sound	Nominated	
FAMAS Award	1994	Sakay	FAMAS Award for Best Director	Nominated	
Gawad Urian Awards	1994	Sakay	Best Direction (Pinakamahusay na Direksyon)	Nominated	
Gawad Urian Awards	1994	Sakay	Best Cinematography (Pinakamahusay na Sinematograpiya)	Nominated	
Cannes Film Festival	May 25, 2000	Anino (English: Shadows)	Short Film Palme d'Or	Won	
Cinemanila International Film Festival	July 9, 2000	—N/a	Special Recognition	Honored	
MMFF Gabi ng Parangal	December 27, 2025	Manila's Finest	Best Director	Nominated	
MMFF Gabi ng Parangal	December 27, 2025	Manila's Finest	Best Cinematography	Won	
