= Marangal na Dalit ng Katagalugan =

National anthem of the Tagalog Republic

Marangál na Dalit ng̃ Katagalugan
English: Honorable Hymn of the Tagalog Nation/People
- National anthem of Tagalog Republic (1896–1897); Philippines
- Lyrics: Julio Nakpil, 1896; Original Tagalog lyrics
- Music: Julio Nakpil, 1896
- Adopted: 1896
- Relinquished: 1897

The Marangál na Dalit ng̃ Katagalugan (English title: Honorable Hymn of the Tagalog Nation/People) is a song of the Philippine Revolution composed in November 1896 by Julio Nakpil at the request of Andres Bonifacio as the anthem of the revolutionary Tagalog Republic. However, this nascent revolutionary government was displaced and superseded by a succession of revolutionary governments headed by Emilio Aguinaldo and the composition known today as Lupang Hinirang became the national anthem of the Republic of the Philippines.

== History ==
Nakpil was requested by Andres Bonifacio to compose a national anthem for his conceptual Filipino nation-state as realized through the Katipunan as its revolutionary government, of which he was the President ("Pangulo"). This concept of the Filipino nation was called the Haring Bayang Katagalugan ("Sovereign Tagalog Nation/People", or "Sovereign Nation of the Tagalog People"), also known as the Republika ng Katagalugan ("Republic of the Tagalog Nation/People", simplified in other languages as "Tagalog Republic"), with "sovereign nation" and "republic" being used interchangeably, and "Tagalog" etc. being used in place of "Filipino", etc.

The song was first performed in Bonifacio's camp in Balara in November 1896. The form chosen by Nakpil, the dalit, was traditionally a sung prayer or supplication. Later, Nakpil sent a copy of the Himno Nacional to Bonifacio, who was then in Cavite, together with a letter to him dated January 30, 1897. Bonifacio acknowledged this in a reply letter dated February 13.

However, in an ensuing power struggle involving Bonifacio and the Magdalo and Magdiwang factions of the Katipunan in Cavite, the Katipunan revolutionary government was displaced and superseded by a succession of revolutionary governments headed by Emilio Aguinaldo, and Bonifacio was eventually executed by that government on May 7.

== Lyrics ==
The following lyrics follow Nakpil's handwritten notes, marked with "Balara - Nov. 1896”.

Tagalog

Mabuhay, mabuhay yaong Kalayaan
At pasulungin ang puri't Kabanalan.
Kastila'y mairing ng Katagalugan
At ngayo'y ipagwagi ang kahusayan.

English translation

Long live, long live this Freedom
And let us promote virtue and Holiness.
Let the Tagalog Nation/People fight the Spaniards
And now let us make excellence triumph.

Nakpil's reconstructed sheet music indicates further repetition of some words, thus:

Tagalog

Mabuhay, mabuhay yaong Kalayaan, Kalayaan
At pasulungin ang puri't Kabanalan, ang puri't Kabanalan.
Kastila'y mairing ng Katagalugan
At ngayo'y ipagwagi ang kahusayan.

Nakpil's notes include other verses, also marked as "Balara - Nov. 1896", but without sheet music, so it is unclear if these are additional, draft, or variant verses, or what words are supposed to repeat.

Tagalog

Mabuhay, mabuhay ang Sangkapuluan
At ngayo'y ipagdiwang ang Kalayaan.
Ang pamimiyapis siyang pagsikapan
At Kastila'y mamatay sa Kasamaan.

Mabuhay, mabuhay ang Sangkapuluan
At ngayo'y ipagdiwang ang Kalayaan.
Kaya'y iwagayway bandilang Kamahalan.
Kastila'y mairing ng Sangdaigdigan.

English translation

Long live, long live the Archipelago
And now let us celebrate Freedom.
Let us strive to face hardship in battle
And may the Spaniards die of Wickedness.

Long live, long live the Archipelago
And now let us celebrate Freedom.
So let us wave the Beloved flag.
May the entire World fight the Spaniards.

== Replacement ==
Nakpil recalled decades later that even after Bonifacio's death, the song was still being played in Cavite and Laguna as late as 1898. After the Aguinaldo was chosen over Bonifacio as President in the Tejeros Convention elections held on March 22, 1897. On June 5, after Julian Felipe went to Aguinaldo bearing a letter of introduction from Mariano Trias, he was asked to compose a different march to be played at the declaration of independence ceremonies planned for June 11. On that date, after Felipe played the march he had drafted, tentatively titled Marcha Filipina Magdalo, on the piano for Aguinaldo and other top revolutionary leaders and, after discussion between them and other top generals, Aguinaldo accepted Felipe's composition as the Marcha Nacional Filipina. Felipe's piece, with added lyrics derived from the Spanish-language poem Filipinas by Jose Palma from 1899, is still the current official national anthem under the title Lupang Hinirang ("Chosen Land").

== Later years ==
In 1903, Nakpil extended the anthem as an instrumental tribute to Jose Rizal under the title “Salve, Patria” ("Hail, Fatherland"). The only surviving copies of the original score were destroyed in 1945, during the Battle of Manila. The version which survives today was reconstructed by Nakpil from memory as a piece for piano years later.

Its use was likely revived by Macario Sakay, a compatriot of Bonifacio and Nakpil who revived and continued the Katipunan and the Tagalog Republic from 1902 to 1906, years after the end of Aguinaldo's final Republic (the "First Philippine Republic").

The piece has described by historians as "very solemn, almost mournful" while other historians have opined that the lyrics and music do not quite seem to match each other, but the music is less obviously derivative of foreign pieces compared to Felipe's composition.

== In modern media ==
The song appears in a 1993 biopic of Macario Sakay, titled Sakay.

The song was recorded by the folk music duo Inang Laya in 1996 but only the first verse.

== See also ==
- Lupang Hinirang
- Dalit (poem)
- Tagalog Republic
