= List of Israeli films of 2000 =

A list of films produced by the Israeli film industry in 2000.

== 2000 releases ==
Premiere	Title	Director	Cast	Genre	Notes	Ref
30 March	Pere	Yoram Gal	Omer Barnea Dor Peles, Adi Ezroni	Comedy, Drama		
17 May	Kippur (Hebrew: כיפור)	Amos Gitai	Liron Levo, Tomer Russo, Uri Klauzner, Yoram Hattab and Guy Amir	Drama, War	Israeli-French co-production; Entered into the 2000 Cannes Film Festival	
15 July	The Investigation Must Go On (Hebrew: הבולשת חוקרת, lit. "Secret police investigating")	Marek Rozenbaum	Moshe Ivgy, Aki Avni	Crime, Drama		
19 July	Foreign Sister (Hebrew: אחות זרה)	Dan Wolman	Tamar Yerushalmi	Drama		
20 July	Besame Mucho (Hebrew: בסמה מוצ'ו)	Joseph Pitchhadze	Moni Moshonov, Menashe Noy	Thriller		
26 October	Shkarim Levanim (Hebrew: שקרים לבנים, lit. "White Lies")		Jack Adalist Sharon Alexander, Salim Dau	Drama		
30 November	Time of Favor (Hebrew: ההסדר, lit. "The arrangement")	Joseph Cedar	Aki Avni, Tinkerbell, Idan Alterman, Assi Dayan and Abraham Celektar	Drama		

=== Unknown premiere date ===
Premiere	Title	Director	Cast	Genre	Notes	Ref
?	Total Love (Hebrew: משהו טוטאלי, lit. "Something Total")	Gur Bentvich	Maor Cohen, Zohar Dinnar, Gur Bentvich and Tinkerbell	Adventure, Romance		
?	Kinu'ach (Hebrew: קינוח, lit. "Dessert")	Amit Sakomski	Yehuda Efroni, Ruth Farhi, Yair Nesher			

== Awards ==
=== Ophir Award ===	=== Wolgin Award ===

== Notable deaths ==
- February 23 – Ofra Haza, Israeli singer and actress (b. 1957)

== See also ==
- 2000 in Israel
