= Pen Medina =

Filipino actor

- Born: Crispin Parungao Medina Sr. August 27, 1950 (age 76); Arayat, Pampanga, Philippines
- Occupations: Actor; character actor; stage actor; film writer; model; painter
- Years active: 1977–present
- Known for: Hagorn in Encantadia
- Notable work: Kamera Obskura; Muro-Ami; Deathrow; Layang Bilanggo; 10,000 Hours
- Spouse: Victoria Aquino Chupungco (separated)
- Partner: Tess Antonio
- Children: 7 (including Ping and Alex)
- Awards: Full list

Crispin "Pen" Parungao Medina Sr. (born August 27, 1950, in Arayat, Pampanga) is a Filipino actor who started acting in theater plays in his youth. He eventually played versatile roles on the big screen and in various television shows. He became well known after getting the role of the villainous Hagorn in the 2005 fantasy television series Encantadia. He has won the Nora Aunor Ulirang Artista Lifetime Achievement Award during the 33rd PMPC Star Awards for Movies, the Best Supporting Actor Award at the 62nd FAMAS Awards, and the Best Actor Award at the 6th Cinema One Originals Film Festival.

He is also the second KFC Filipino Colonel as well as a model and painter. He is also an activist who joins rallies against those in power as well as participates in anti-vaccination and anti-mask protests amidst the COVID-19 pandemic.

== Early life ==
Pen Medina was born to Eliseo Medina Sr. and Trinidad Parungao in Arayat, Pampanga on August 27, 1950. He graduated high school at Arayat Institute of Pampanga and went to different schools in colleges, which include the University of Santo Tomas, Far Eastern University, and the University of the East. He usually took up fine arts, premed, and other courses with a bachelor of arts degree but he later dropped out and pursued an acting career.

== Career ==
=== Theater ===
Medina started as a theater actor and appeared in productions by Teatro Kabataan such as Ang Paglilitis ni Mang Serapio (The Trial of Old Serapio, 1977) and Nang Pista sa Aming Bayan (During Our Town's Feast, 1978). He portrayed various characters in the Cultural Center of the Philippines plays, which include Andres Bonifacio (1980) as Emilio Jacinto, Kanser (Cancer) in 1981 as Kapitan Tiago, and appeared again in 1993 as Elias, Gregorio Aglipay (1982) as Fr. Brillantes, Makinig Kayong Mabuti (Listen Carefully, 1986) as Gen. Henry Baltazar, and Ginuntuang Bayan (Shūsaku Endō's Golden Country, 1990) as Fr. Ferreira. He also appeared in stage plays at the University of the Philippines such as Patay Na si Sizwe Banzi (Athol Fugard's Sizwe Banzi Is Dead, 1986) as Styles, Tatalon (1987) as the Jeepney Driver; and Supremo (Supreme Chief, 1991) as Andres Bonifacio.

He also acted in the Metropolitan Theater appearing in plays such as Gironiere (1985) as Alila, and El Filibusterismo (Subversion, 1991, an adaptation of Jose Rizal's second novel) as Simoun. He also portrayed Rizal/Crisostomo Ibarra in Noli Me Tangere (Touch Me Not, 1986, an adaptation of Rizal's first novel) at Puerta Real. Other theaters that he performed for include Teatro Pilipino, Tanghalang Pilipino, and Bulwagang Gantimpala as well as for independent theater groups or on campus.

=== Film ===
It was in the early 1980s when Medina crossed over to films. In 1982, he starred in his first film, Himala, which was headlined by Nora Aunor. He subsequently appeared in other Filipino films in the 1980s such as Karnal (Of the Flesh, 1983), Sister Stella L. (1984), Scorpio Nights (1985), Virgin Forest (1985), and Unfaithful Wife (1986). He also has several acting credits in foreign films, most notably, the 1988 Australian television film Dangerous Life, where he plays Col. Eduardo Doromal, a fictionalized character based on a historical figure during the People Power Revolution.

In the 1990s, Medina continued his film career starring in historical films and films with social relevance. He starred in the 1993 film Sakay as Lucio de Vega, a historical figure who, together with Macario Sakay, were revolutionaries fighting the Americans, and were later outlawed and hanged in 1907. In the 1998 film José Rizal, he played Paciano Mercado, the older brother of Jose Rizal. He also played Jose Rizal in the documentary film entitled Jose Rizal: Ang Buhay ng Isang Bayani (Jose Rizal: A Hero's Life, 1996), which was produced by Ateneo de Manila University. The other films in the 1990s that Pen starred in include Mumbaki (Shaman, 1996), Ligaya ang Itawag Mo sa Akin (They Call Me Joy, 1997), and Sa Pusod ng Dagat (In the Navel of the Sea, 1998).

In the Marilou Diaz-Abaya film Muro Ami (1999), Medina got his first acting award as he won Best Supporting Actor given during the 25th Metro Manila Film Festival. The film tells a story about a cruel captain named Fredo (Cesar Montano's character) who employs children for his illegal fishing business. Pen played Dado, the father of Fredo. After a year, he became one of the cast of the Joel Lamangan film Deathrow playing a booty bandit inmate named Gabino. His role earned him another Best Supporting Actor award given by the Film Academy of the Philippines in 2001. He starred as an ex-convict in another prison-themed film, Layang Bilanggo (2010), in which he garnered a Best Actor award from the 6th Cinema One Originals Film Festival.

In the 2012 film Kamera Obskura, Medina got to play the main role of Juan, a character from a lost silent film. Pen also co-wrote the script of the film.

=== Television ===
After starring in stage plays and films, Medina entered television and appeared in the political satire television show Sic O'Clock News in the late 1980s. He continued to guest in other television programs, which include Goin' Bananas, and Batibot. He is also part of the cast of the television series Villa Quintana, Tabing Ilog, and Sa Puso Ko Iingatan Ka. In 2005, he starred in the fantasy series Encantadia as the main villain Hagorn, which is his most well-known television role. His other television acting credits include Joaquin Bordado, E-Boy, Be Careful With My Heart, Aso ni San Roque and FPJ's Batang Quiapo.

== Activism ==
Medina is also known as an activist who joined rallies including calling for then Philippine President Gloria Macapagal-Arroyo's resignation, protesting against the burial of former Philippine President Ferdinand Marcos, and protesting against the meddling of foreign governments, particularly the United States and China, over Philippine affairs. He also attended a rally against then-Philippine President Rodrigo Duterte and urged protesters to love and enlighten supporters of the Duterte administration. Amid the COVID-19 pandemic in the Philippines, he also joined anti-vaccination and anti-mask protests saying that the COVID-19 virus "can go through any mask" and challenged critics, particularly television personality Kiko Rustia, to a debate. Rustia declined the debate because he is not a doctor and he "support(s) vaccines and the science behind it."

== Personal life ==
He is married to Victoria Aquino Chupungco and he is the father of Karl Medina, Crispin "Ping" Medina II, Alex Vincent Medina, Japs Medina, Victor Medina, Zeth Medina and JL Medina. His sons Ping and Alex, whom both had their roots in indie films, are active on local television. His other sons Karl and Victor have followed suit by taking on acting roles in other indie films as well. Pen also has children with actress Tess Antonio, with whom he has been in a live-in relationship for several years. Although Pen and Victoria separated, their marriage was never annulled.

=== Health ===
In July 2022, his family announced that he has a degenerative disc disease and has been bedridden in a hospital for several weeks. He has undergone spinal surgery to treat the disease.

== Filmography ==
=== Film ===
Year	Title	Role	Source
1982	Himala	Pilo	
1985	Virgin Forest	Macabebes member	
1985	Scorpio Nights	Pen	
1986	Unfaithful Wife	Detective Crispin Medina	
1988	Hiwaga sa Balete Drive	Gary	
1989	Fight for Us	Chief Sparrow	
1990	Fatal Vacation	Leader of military	
1991	Shake, Rattle & Roll III	Fr. Salazar	
1992	Shake, Rattle & Roll IV	NGO member	
1993	Sakay	Col. Lucio De Vega	
1994	Col. Billy Bibit, RAM	Datu Kiram	
1994	Mars Ravelo's Darna! Ang Pagbabalik	Barangay captain	
1996	Dead Sure	Pepe Moreno	
1997	Ligaya ang Itawag Mo sa Akin	Tikyo	
1998	Sa Pusod ng Dagat	Gusting	
1998	José Rizal	Paciano Rizal	
1999	Muro-Ami	Dado	
2000	Deathrow	Gabino	
2003	Till There Was You	Frank Boborol	
2004	Naglalayag	Pacio Garcia	
2004	Evolution of a Filipino Family	Kadyo	
2004	Bcuz of U	Tatay	
2005	Baryoke		
2007	Ang Cute ng Ina Mo!	Ferdinand Marcos	
2008	Banal	Manalo	
2008	I.T.A.L.Y.	Gary Pinlac	
2009	Mangatyanan	Danilo Marquez	
2010	Layang Bilanggo	Paul	
2010	Noy	Nick	
2012	Kamera Obskura	Juan	
2013	10,000 Hours	Sebastian Jago	
2014	Sa Ngalan ng Ama, Ina at mga Anak	Erning	
2014	Gangster Lolo		
2016	Fruits N' Vegetables: Mga Bulakboleros	Janitor at the U.P. Campus-Diliman	
2017	Mang Kepweng Returns	Ingkong Kapiz	

=== Television ===
Year	Title	Role	Source
1987	Sic O'Clock News	Various characters	
1988	A Dangerous Life	Col. Eduardo Doromal	
1993	Noli Me Tangere	Sisa's husband	
1995	Bayani	Datu Inong Awe	
1995	Villa Quintana	Felix Samonte	
2000	Tabing Ilog	Epifanio "Panyong" Delos Santos	
2001	Sa Puso Ko Iingatan Ka	Abner Araman	
2005	Ang Mahiwagang Baul: Ang Alamat ng Kawayan	Ermitanyo	
2005	Encantadia	Hagorn	
2006	Encantadia: Pag-ibig Hanggang Wakas	Hagorn	
2006	Atlantika	Dr. Naval	
2007	Fantastic Man	Singkit	
2007	Mga Kuwento ni Lola Basyang	Hari	
2007	Mga Mata ni Anghelita	Father Joseph	
2008	E.S.P.	Bestre	
2008	Komiks Presents: Tiny Tony	Morgan Peralta	
2008	Obra		
2008	Joaquin Bordado	Jilco	
2008	Codename: Asero	Dr. Tagimoro	
2009	Sine Novela: Ngayon at Kailanman	Venor Torres	
2009	Agimat: Ang Mga Alamat ni Ramon Revilla: Tiagong Akyat	Castro "Kastrong Bato" Mananquil	
2009	May Bukas Pa	Totoy	
2010	Rod Santiago's Agua Bendita	Padre Guido	
2010	Carlo J. Caparas' Panday Kids	Tasyo	
2010	Star Confessions	Joseph's father	
2010	Ilumina	Francisco	
2011	Pablo S. Gomez's Mutya	Haring Merrick	
2011	Guns and Roses	Philip "Tsong" Marasigan	
2011	100 Days to Heaven	Tagasundo	
2011	Ikaw ay Pag-Ibig	Gabriel	
2012	E-Boy	Tatang	
2012	Aso ni San Roque	Ben "Mother Ben" Asino	
2013	Little Champ	Elmer	
2013	Bayan Ko	Governor Antonio Rubio	
2013	Carlo J. Caparas' Dugong Buhay	Armando "Amang" Bernabe	
2013	Cassandra: Warrior Angel	Lolo Gimo	
2013	Magkano Ba ang Pag-ibig?	Andoy Aguirre	
2014	My BFF	Gerry	
2015	Oh My G!	G	
2015	Imbestigador: Kokey	Fernando "Nading" Guevarra	
2015	Alamat: Alamat ng Bayabas	Haring Barabas (voice)	
2015	Beautiful Strangers	Levi Rodriguez	
2015	Pasión de Amor	Maryo	
2016	FPJ's Ang Probinsyano	Fernan	
2016	A1 Ko Sa 'Yo	Dom Domingo	
2016	Karelasyon: Tenant	Greg	
2016	Dear Uge: Acting Dyowa	Daddy	
2016	Ika-6 na Utos	Noel	
2017	Tsuperhero	Lolo Pikoy / Piccololo	
2018	The Cure	Rigor	
2018	Wish Ko Lang!: Mistaken Identity	Indo	
2018	Victor Magtanggol	Mr. Alcala	
2018	Ngayon at Kailanman	Lodi	
2019	Sahaya	Panglima Alari	
2020	24/7	Dado Narvaez	
2020	La Vida Lena	Francisco "Kiko" Cabrera	
2022	Love You Stranger	Mayor Harry	
2023- 2025	FPJ's Batang Quiapo	Marciano "Marsing" Dimaculangan	

== Awards ==
Year	Award-giving body	Category	Work	Result
1993	41st FAMAS Awards	Best Supporting Actor	Sakay	Nominated
1994	18th Gawad Urian Awards	Best Supporting Actor (Pinakamahusay na Pangalawang Aktor)	Sakay	Nominated
1999	25th Metro Manila Film Festival	Best Supporting Actor	Muro Ami	Won
2001	Film Academy of the Philippines	Best Supporting Actor	Deathrow	Won
2010	6th Cinema One Originals Film Festival	Best Actor	Layang Bilanggo	Won
2013	39th Metro Manila Film Festival	Best Supporting Actor	10,000 Hours	Won
2014	62nd FAMAS Awards	Best Supporting Actor	10,000 Hours	Won
2017	33rd PMPC Star Awards for Movies	Nora Aunor Ulirang Artista Lifetime Achievement Award	N/A	Won
