= Sakay (film) =

- Theatrical release poster
- Directed by: Raymond Red
- Screenplay by: Ian Victoriano
- Story by: Raymond Red; Ian Victoriano
- Produced by: Ana Marie Datuin
- Starring: Julio Diaz
- Cinematography: Raymond Red; Lauro Rene Manda
- Edited by: Raymond Red; Lauro Rene Manda
- Music by: Ronnie Quesada
- Production companies: Alpha Omega Productions; Zeta Enterprises
- Release date: June 24, 1993
- Running time: 90 minutes
- Country: Philippines
- Language: Filipino

Sakay is a 1993 Filipino historical drama film edited, shot and directed by Raymond Red. The film stars Julio Diaz, Tetchie Agbayani, and Leopoldo Salcedo. It was produced by Alpha Omega Productions. The film portrays the latter part of the life of Filipino patriot and hero Macario Sakay, who was declared an outlaw and a criminal for continuing hostilities against the United States after the "official" end of the Philippine–American War. It was also the last film appearance of Leopoldo Salcedo before his sudden death in 1998.

== Plot ==
Macario Sakay is a carriage factory worker and stage actor from Tondo, Manila who joins Andres Bonifacio's revolutionary secret society, the Katipunan. He fights during the Philippine Revolution against Spain and later in the Philippine–American War. Sakay remains in the field even after the capture of President Emilio Aguinaldo and the fall of the First Philippine Republic. He was captured, but is released during an amnesty.

Sakay then takes to the mountains to revive the Katipunan, together with Francisco Carreon, Julian Montalan, Cornelio Felizardo and other rebel leaders. He proclaims himself General and President of the "Tagalog Republic" (Republika ng Katagalugan), and engaged the United States Army and the Philippine Constabulary in guerrilla warfare. On occasion, he is aided by talisman-wearing cultist warriors.

After years of fighting, Sakay is convinced to surrender by Filipino labor leader Dr. Dominador Gomez, who argued that the establishment of a Philippine National Assembly, instead of armed resistance, presented the soundest option towards attaining Filipino independence.

On the understanding that the American government offered amnesty, Sakay and his officers come down from the mountains. However, as a ruse, they were invited to a reception in Cavite and arrested by the Americans. Tried and convicted for brigandage, Sakay and Colonel Lucio de Vega are hanged while Montalan and others received life imprisonment.

== Cast ==
- Julio Diaz as Gen. Macario Sakay
- Tetchie Agbayani as Elena
- Leopoldo Salcedo as Sakay's father
- Nanding Josef as Dr. Dominador Gomez
- Karlo Altomonte as Francisco Carreon
- Crispin Medina as Col. Lucio de Vega
- Ray Ventura as Gen. Cornelio Felizardo
- Raymond Keannu as Gen. Julian Montalan
- Mike Lloren as Gen. Emilio Aguinaldo
- John Arcilla as Gen. Leon Villafuerte
- Bon Vibar as Capt. Harry Hill Bandholtz
- Arvin Pestaño as Antonio Montenegro
- Raul Arellano

== Critical response ==
Critic Mario E. Bautista, writing for Movie Flash, deemed Sakay to be the best film of 1993, calling it "not your usual mindless local flick" for its historical setting and technical merits, and praising the performance of Crispin Medina as worthy of a Best Supporting Actor award at the Manila Film Festival.

== Accolades ==
Year	Award-giving body	Category	Recipient	Result
1993
1993	Manila Film Festival	Gatpuno Antonio Villegas Cultural Award	Sakay	Won
1993	Manila Film Festival	Lingap ng Inang Maynila	Sakay	Won
1994			Sakay	
1994	FAMAS Award		Sakay	
1994	FAMAS Award	Best Picture	Sakay	Nominated
1994	FAMAS Award	Best Director	Raymond Red	Nominated
1994	FAMAS Award	Best Actor	Julio Diaz	Nominated
1994	FAMAS Award	Best Supporting Actor	Pen Medina	Nominated
1994	FAMAS Award	Best Art Direction	Danny Red and Ronald Red	Won
1994	Gawad Urian Award			
1994	Gawad Urian Award	Best Picture (Pinakamahusay na Pelikula)	Sakay	Nominated
1994	Gawad Urian Award	Best Direction (Pinakamahusay na Direksyon)	Raymond Red	Nominated
1994	Gawad Urian Award	Best Supporting Actor (Pinakamahusay na Pangalawang Aktor)	Pen Medina	Nominated
1994	Gawad Urian Award	Best Cinematography (Pinakamahusay na Sinematograpiya)	Larry Manda and Raymond Red	Nominated
1994	Gawad Urian Award	Best Production Design (Pinakamahusay na Disenyong Pamproduksiyon)	Danny Red and Ronald Red	Nominated
1994	Gawad Urian Award	Best Sound (Pinakamahusay na Tunog)	Gaudencio Barredo	Nominated
