= Kippur =

- DVD release cover
- Directed by: Amos Gitai
- Written by: Amos Gitai; Marie-Jose Sanselme
- Produced by: Amos Gitai; Michel Propper; Laurent Truchot
- Starring: Liron Levo; Tomer Russo; Uri Klauzner; Yoram Hattab; Guy Amir
- Cinematography: Renato Berta
- Edited by: Monica Coleman
- Music by: Jan Garbarek
- Production companies: Canal+; Agav Hafakot
- Distributed by: Kino International
- Release dates: May 18, 2000 (Cannes); October 5, 2000 (Israel); November 3, 2000 (United States)
- Running time: 123 minutes
- Country: Israel
- Language: Hebrew
- Box office: $114,283

Kippur (Hebrew: כיפור) is a 2000 Israeli war drama film directed by Amos Gitai. The storyline was conceived from a screenplay written by Gitai and Marie-Jose Sanselme; based on Gitai's own experiences as a member of a helicopter rescue crew during the 1973 Yom Kippur War. The film stars actors Liron Levo, Tomer Russo and Uri Klauzner in principal roles.

A joint collective effort to commit to the film's production was made by Canal+ and Agav Hafakot studios. It was commercially distributed by Kino International theatrically and by Kino Video for home media. Following its cinematic release, the film was entered into the 2000 Cannes Film Festival among other awards selections. Kippur explores war, politics, and human rescue.

Kippur premiered in theaters nationwide in Israel on October 5, 2000. The film was screened through limited release in the United States on November 3, 2000, grossing $114,283 in domestic ticket receipts. In the U.S., Kippur was at its widest release showing in 5 theaters nationwide. It was generally met with positive critical reviews before its initial screening in cinemas.

== Plot ==
It is October 6, 1973, and Egypt along with Syria have continued their undeclared war on Israel by launching attacks in the Sinai Peninsula and Golan Heights. Weinraub (Liron Levo) and his friend Ruso (Tomer Ruso) are Israeli reservists in the Egoz Reconnaissance Unit who are called to reserve duty to fight in the surprise conflict. The two make their way to the Golan Heights to locate their reserve unit. However, during the chaotic circumstances, they never find it, and end up sleeping by the side of the road.

The next morning, they are awakened by Dr. Klauzner (Uri Klauzner), who asks for a ride to Ramat David where he serves on the air force base there. After transporting Dr. Klauzner to the base, Weinraub and Ruso agree to volunteer with a first-aid rescue team. Their ongoing mission involves evacuating dead and wounded soldiers from the battlefield. Later on October 10, their helicopter crew is deployed to Syria for a covert operation. During their mission, the helicopter is struck by a missile, killing one of the co-pilots and injuring everyone on board. Weinraub and Ruso are among those who survive and are picked by another rescue helicopter. They become patients at a field hospital, thus ending their role in the war.

== Cast ==
Liron Levo	Weinraub
Tomer Russo	Russo
Uri Klauzner	Dr. Klauzner
Yoram Hattab	Pilot
Juliano Mer-Khamis	Officer
Guy Amir	Gadassi
Ran Kauchinsky	Shlomo
Kobi Livne	Kobi
Liat Levo	Dina
Pini Mittleman	Hospital Doctor

== Production ==
=== Development ===
The premise of Kippur is based on the true story of the Yom Kippur War, as told by the personal account of Israeli army reservists. On October 6, 1973, the Egyptian army launched a large-scale offensive against Israeli positions in the Sinai Peninsula which was followed by a second attack by Syria from the Golan Heights in the north. the sudden defeats and considerable loss of life that occurred at the beginning of the conflict handed down a terrible psychological blow to Israelis. Previously, the Israeli military believed it was invulnerable in the region. On April 11, 1974, the prime minister Golda Meir resigned with her cabinet followed suit, including chief of staff Moshe Dayan. Yitzhak Rabin, who had spent most of the war as an advisor to Elazar in an unofficial capacity, became head of the new government, which was seated in June. The Israeli National Security Council was created to improve coordination between the different security and intelligence bodies, and the political branch of government.

The emotional impact on the individual Israeli soldiers is expanded upon in the film. The complete transformation from a quiet civilian life to a chaotic war scene is depicted in the storyline. The Israeli soldiers cope with assisting dead and seriously wounded troops while taking enemy fire.

=== Filming ===
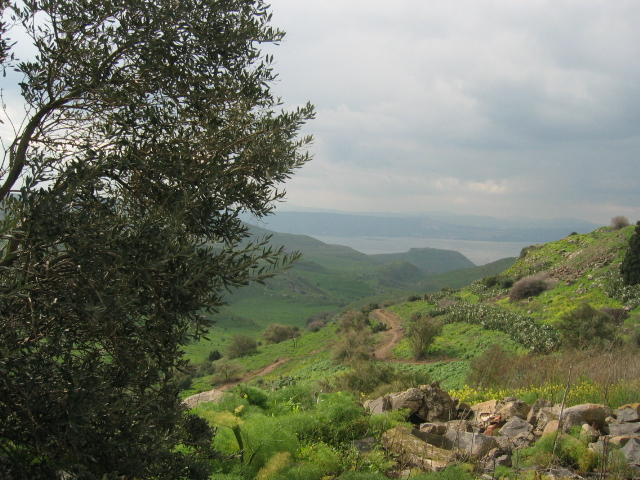
Golan Heights where the story took place

The film is largely autobiographical, based on Gitai's own experiences as a member of a helicopter rescue crew during the war. Scenes were shot with the assistance of the Israeli Defense Forces which provided much of the military equipment used in the film. Most of the characters are named after the actors who play them, with the exception of the title character, who is given only the last name Weinraub, which was Amos Gitai's family name until his father changed it to the Hebrew name Gitai.

The helicopter crash that ends the film actually happened. Gitai's helicopter was shot down by a Syrian missile on his 23rd birthday. The co-pilot was killed and several others wounded. Gitai reportedly considered it the pivotal moment of his life.

=== Music ===
The score for the film was originally composed by musician Jan Garbarek. The sound effects in the film were supervised by Alex Claude. The mixing of the sound effects were orchestrated by Philippe Amouroux and Cyril Holtz while being supervised by Eli Yarkoni.

== Reception ==
=== Critical response ===
Among mainstream critics in the U.S., the film received mostly positive reviews. Rotten Tomatoes reported that 82% of 22 sampled critics gave the film a positive review, with an average score of 6.6 out of 10. At Metacritic, which assigns a weighted average out of 100 to critics' reviews, the film received a score of 75 based on 15 reviews. The film was entered into the Toronto and Cannes film festivals and received a nomination for the Peace Award from the Political Film Society.

Kevin Thomas, writing in the Los Angeles Times said, Kippur was a "classic war film, at once elegiac and immediate, that takes you smack into the chaos of combat yet is marked by a detached perspective." Lisa Schwarzbaum in Entertainment Weekly offered a mostly positive review commenting, "Amos Gitai's intense, autobiographically based drama is set during Israel's 1973 Yom Kippur War, but current Middle East tensions add urgency to this stark study in the unglorious matter of factness of battle." She expressed satisfaction by saying, "this sobering antiwar war movie is his rueful acknowledgment of those who fight with no Godot in sight." In The Village Voice, critic J. Hoberman reserved compliment for the lead acting and directing saying, "Gitai's strategy encourages the viewer to ponder the logistics of war—as well as those of filming war." He noted though, that the "ensemble acting sometimes falters, and due to Gitai's camera placement, it can be difficult to distinguish between the various characters—although Klauzner establishes an indelible identity in a brief moment of downtime when he discusses his childhood in Europe during World War II."

"Closely based on Gitai's own combat experience during the Yom Kippur War and filmed with the utmost attention to detail, this mission is the movie—as well as the most radical narrative filmmaking of Gitai's career."
—J. Hoberman, writing in The Village Voice

A.O. Scott writing in The New York Times came to believe, "The relentless attention to the sheer awfulness of war, which is the film's great strength, is also something of a shortcoming. Mr. Gitai reproduces the numb horror of wading through fields of gore almost too well: the self-protective response is to shut down your emotions, as the characters do. Kippur immerses you in violence and agony, but it may leave you with a curious feeling of detachment." Sean Axmaker of the Seattle Post-Intelligencer, felt Kippur was "almost abstract in its portrait of confusion. Long, numbing scenes of soldiers rushing through the war zone with the wounded and returning for more are accompanied by an overwhelming soundtrack of tanks, helicopters and explosions." He also reserved praise for director Gitai, saying he "captures a chaotic portrait of the war with no glory, only the confusion, fear, and fatigue of a tour under fire." Author G.A. of Time Out called the film "impressive" while remarking "Gitai's autobiographically inspired account of the harrowing experiences of a first-aid team in the aftermath of Syria and Egypt's surprise attack on Israel in October 1973 typically features long, sinuous takes to chart the way in which patriotic enthusiasm is steadily eroded and replaced by fatigue and disillusionment." In a mixed review, Fred Camper writing for the Chicago Reader felt director "Gitai plunges the viewer into the reality of modern warfare, in which the enemy is often invisible – we never see the Syrians in Kippur – and battle lines are often unclear." Jack Mathews writing for the NY Daily News, believed that instead of "heightening our sense of empathy, we become numbed by the repetition" of the film.

"There's not a lot in terms of story, but the sheer, visceral physicality of the mise-en-scène makes the movie engrossing throughout".—G.A., writing in Time Out

David Sterritt of The Christian Science Monitor bluntly referred to the film as "Both a blood-churning war movie and a mind-stirring antiwar movie, focusing not on guts and glory but on the stark realities of real battlefield experience." Critic Ken Fox of TV Guide was impressed with Gitai's film calling it "Raw" and "completely devoid of the things one expects from a war film: No heroes, no flag-waving, no screeds against man killing man." He exclaimed, "Kippur is about the actual work of combat." Writer Ella Taylor for LA Weekly viewed Kippur as a "radically different – more nakedly autobiographical, more naturalistic, more forgiving – from Gitai's highly conceptual and stylized body of work, there are clear thematic continuities." Left unimpressed though, was critic Michael Rechtshaffen of The Hollywood Reporter who wrote that the film was "A patience-trying docudrama almost completely devoid of any trace of narrative structure or even defined characters." Critic Leonard Maltin referred to the film as being "unique" and "a painstaking, grueling picture of war."

=== Box office ===
The film premiered in cinemas on November 3, 2000 in limited release throughout the U.S.. During its opening weekend, the film opened in a distant 66th place grossing $17,007 in business showing at 5 locations. The film Charlie's Angels soundly beat its competition during that weekend opening in first place with $40,128,550. The film's revenue dropped by 29% in its second week of release, earning $11,981. For that particular weekend, the film fell to 71st place screening in 4 theaters but not challenging a top fifty position. The film Charlie's Angels, remained in first place grossing $24,606,860 in box office revenue. In its final limited weekend showing in theaters, the film ended up in 99th place grossing $1,978. The film went on to top out domestically at $114,283 in total ticket sales through a 10-week theatrical run. For 2000 as a whole, the film would cumulatively rank at a box office performance position of 303.

=== Home media ===
Following its cinematic release in theaters, the film was released in VHS video format on August 28, 2001. The Region 1 Code widescreen edition of the film was also released on DVD in the United States on August 28, 2001. Special features for the DVD include; Letterbox 1.85 screen format, stereo audio in Hebrew with English subtitles, and interactive menus with scene access. Currently, there is no scheduled release date set for a future Blu-ray Disc version of the film.

== See also ==
- 2000 in Israeli film

== Bibliography ==
- Rabinovich, Abraham (2005). The Yom Kippur War: The Epic Encounter That Transformed the Middle East. Schocken. ISBN 978-0-8052-1124-5.
- Herzog, Chaim (2009). War Of Atonement: The Inside Story of the Yom Kippur War. Casemate. ISBN 978-1-935149-13-2.
- Dunstan, Simon (2007). The Yom Kippur War: The Arab-Israeli War of 1973. Osprey Publishing. ISBN 978-1-84603-288-2.
- Blum, Howard (2004). The Eve of Destruction: The Untold Story of the Yom Kippur War. Harper Perennial. ISBN 978-0-06-001400-1.
- Gerrard, Howard (2003). Campaign 118: The Yom Kippur War 1973 (1) The Golan Heights. Osprey Publishing. ISBN 978-1-84176-220-3.
- Oren, Michael (2003). Six Days of War: June 1967 and the Making of the Modern Middle East. Presidio Press. ISBN 978-0-345-46192-6.
- Boyne, Walter (2002). The Two O'Clock War: The 1973 Yom Kippur Conflict and the Airlift That Saved Israel. Thomas Dunne Books. ISBN 978-0-312-27303-3.
- Asher, Dani (2009). The Egyptian Strategy for the Yom Kippur War: An Analysis. McFarland. ISBN 978-0-7864-4253-9.
- Dunstan, Simon (2009). Centurion vs T-55: Yom Kippur War 1973. Osprey Publishing. ISBN 978-1-84603-369-8.
- Adan, Avraham (1991). On the Banks of the Suez: An Israeli General's Personal Account of the Yom Kippur War. Presidio Press. ISBN 978-0-89141-043-0.
- Hampton, Wilborn (2009). War in the Middle East: A Reporter's Story: Black September and the Yom Kippur War. Candlewick. ISBN 978-0-7636-4376-8.
- Kumaraswamy, P.R. (2000). Revisiting the Yom Kippur War. Routledge. ISBN 978-0-7146-8067-5.
- Shaelv, Aryeh (2010). Israel's Intelligence Assessment Before the Yom Kippur War: Disentangling Deception and Distraction. Sussex Academic Press. ISBN 978-1-84519-370-6.
- Bar-Joseph, Uri (2005). The Watchman Fell Asleep: The Surprise Of Yom Kippur And Its Sources. State University of New York Press. ISBN 978-0-7914-6481-6.
