= Anino (film) =

Philippine drama short film

- Directed by: Raymond Red
- Written by: Raymond Red
- Produced by: Raymond Red
- Starring: Ronnie Lazaro; Eddie Garcia; John Arcilla
- Cinematography: Raymond Red
- Edited by: Renewin Alano; Mel Ladao; Raymond Red
- Music by: Yano
- Production company: AtomFilms
- Distributed by: AtomFilms
- Release date: May 2000
- Running time: 13 minutes
- Country: Philippines
- Languages: Filipino; English

Anino (English: Shadows) is a 2000 Philippine drama short film produced, written, shot and co-edited, and directed by Raymond Red. The film follows a photographer living in poverty, hoping to make money by taking pictures with his camera but his day takes an unexpected turn when the older man chases onto him for making his way while a street boy steals his camera.

Anino won the Short Film Palme d'Or award at the 2000 Cannes Film Festival, the first Filipino film to receive this award at Cannes.

== Cast ==
Anino features an ensemble cast:

- Ronnie Lazaro as the photographer
- Eddie Garcia as the angry driver
- John Arcilla as the man in black
- Ronnie Pulido as a street boy
- Ermie Concepcion as an old woman in church

== Accolades ==
Year	Ceremony	Category	Status	Ref/s
2000	Cannes Film Festival	Short Film Palme d'Or	Won	
