= Hassan Yektapanah =

Iranian filmmaker

- حسن یکتاپناه
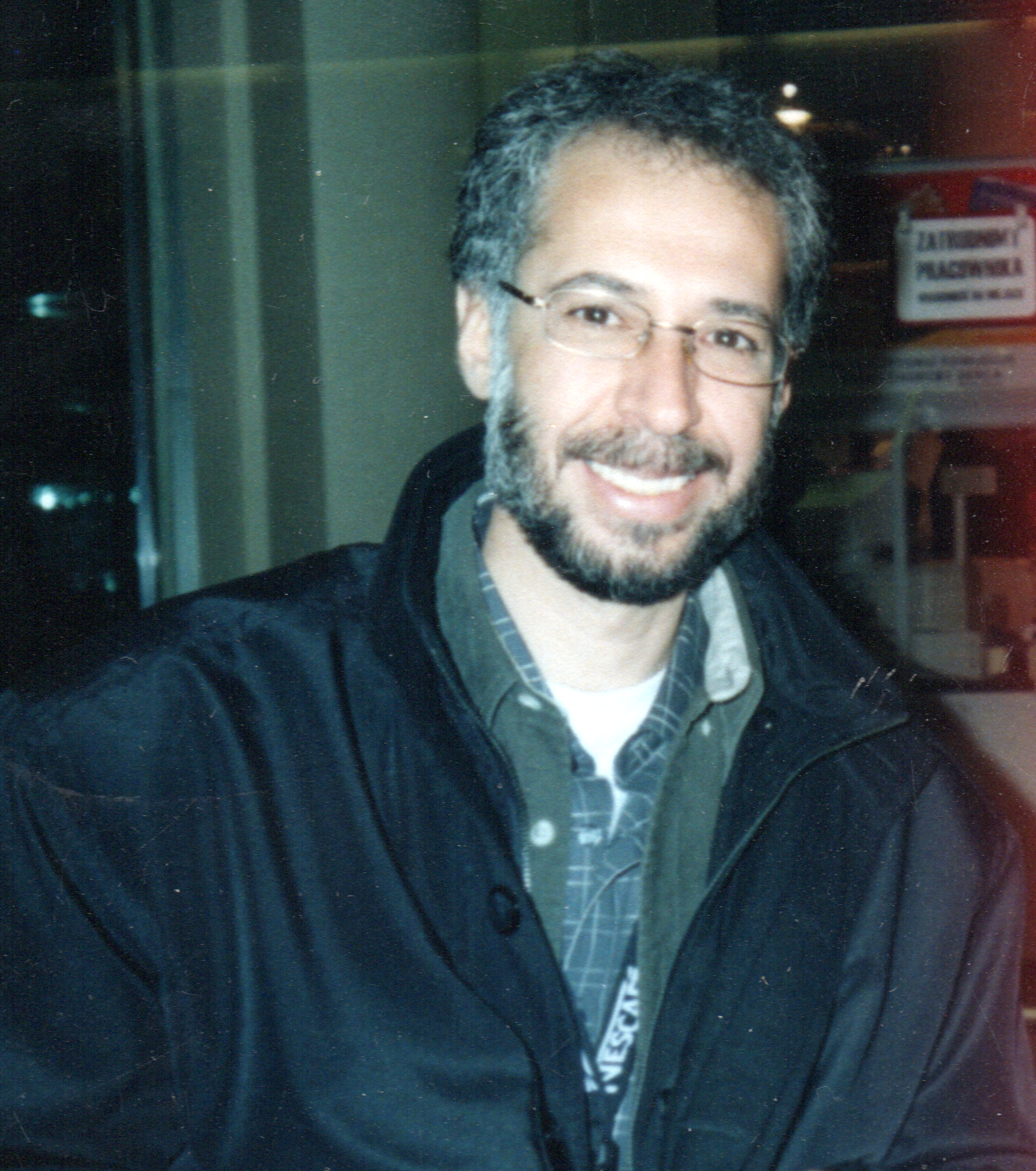
- Yektapanah in 2004
- Born: 26 May 1963 (age 62); Tehran, Imperial State of Iran
- Occupations: Film director, screenwriter
- Years active: 1984–present
- Known for: Djomeh
- Awards: Caméra d'Or (2000)

Hassan Yektapanah (born 26 May 1963) is an Iranian filmmaker and screenwriter.

He began his career as an assistant director, notably working with Jafar Panahi on The Mirror and with Abbas Kiarostami on Taste of Cherry, both released in 1997. The first film Yektapanah directed was Djomeh, which won the Caméra d'Or for Best First Feature at the 2000 Cannes Film Festival.

== Filmography ==
- Djomeh (2000)
- Story Undone (2004)
- Bibi (2008)
- Forbidden (2017)

== Awards and honours ==
- Caméra d'Or, Cannes Film Festival (2000)
- Silver Leopard, Locarno film festival (2004)
