= Djomeh =

2000 film

- Film poster
- Directed by: Hassan Yektapanah
- Written by: Hassan Yektapanah
- Produced by: Fatomeh Abol Ghassemi
- Starring: Rashid Akbari
- Cinematography: Ali Loghmani
- Edited by: Hassan Yektapanah
- Release date: May 2000
- Running time: 94 minutes
- Country: Iran
- Language: Persian

Djomeh is a 2000 Iranian drama film directed by Hassan Yektapanah. It was screened in the Un Certain Regard section at the 2000 Cannes Film Festival, where it won the Caméra d'Or.

== Cast ==
- Rashid Akbari as Habib
- Mahmoud Behraznia as Agha Mohmoud
- Valiollah Beta as The Blind Man
- Mahbobeh Khalili as Setareh
- Jalil Nazari as Djomeh
