= Francisco Carreón =

Filipino revolutionary

- Carreón in the end of 1890s or in the beginning of the 1900s

Acting Vice President of the Tagalog Republic Unofficial Vice President of the Philippines
- In office May 6, 1902 – July 14, 1906
- President: Macario Sakay
- Preceded by: None (Note: Last title was held by Mariano Trias, as Vice President of Tejeros Republic)
- Succeeded by: Abolished (Note: Title was next held by Sergio Osmeña for the Philippine Commonwealth)

Personal details
- Born: October 5, 1868 Cotabato, Cotabato, Captaincy General of the Philippines, Spanish Empire
- Died: Between 1939–1941 (aged 71 or 73) Philippine Commonwealth
- Spouse: Bibiana Bautista
- Children: 1
- Profession: Revolutionary

Military service
- Allegiance: Katipunan; Republika ng Katagalugan
- Years of service: 1896–1906
- Rank: Lieutenant General
- Battles/wars: Philippine Revolution; Battle of Zapote Bridge; Philippine–American War

Francisco Carreón y Marcos (October 5, 1868 – 1939/41) was a Filipino general in the Philippine Revolution against Spain and in the Philippine–American War. As the vice president of Macario Sakay's Tagalog Republic (Tagalog: Republika ng Katagalugan), he continued resistance against the United States up until the dissolution of the republic in 1906. He was captured on July 14, 1906, and was imprisoned in the old Bilibid Prison; he was later released in 1930 through a pardon.

== Biography ==
Carreón was born on October 5, 1868, to Espiridion Carreón and Jacinta Marcos in the southern town of Cotabato on the island of Mindanao. He studied in Trozo, Manila, after relocating there later in his life. Later, he worked as a blacksmith then as a machacante in Tondo, earning one peseta a week for each job. After briefly working in Intramuros, he enlisted in 1886 to become a member of the Spanish Cuerpo de Caribiñero (Carabinier Corps). He later married Bibiana Bastida, and they had a child, Dorotea Carreon who had three children: Enrique Rivera, Nestor Souza and Fe Souza (who married 1Lt Edgardo Gener, USAFFE - son of famous Tagalog poet and writer, Atty. Teodoro Gener of Norzagaray, Bulacan).

=== Philippine Revolution ===
In 1892, Carreón joined the Katipunan following the footsteps of his cousin, Emilio Jacinto. His career in the organization began as head of a branch called Balangay Silanganan (Silanganan Branch) then later moved to another branch called Balangay Dapitan (Dapitan Branch). Like Jacinto he was eventually elected to the Katipunan Supreme Council headed by founder Andrés Bonifacio.

Despite serving at the time as a councilor in the Katipunan, he also served in the Spanish colonial civil guards (Spanish: guardia civil). after moving from the Cuerpo de Caribiñero. Carreón was aware of a plot to free José Rizal using a disguised Emilio Jacinto. He was present at the Cry of Balintawak, the start of the Philippine Revolution.

During the Philippine Revolution, he took part in the Battle of Zapote Bridge in Cavite on February 17, 1897. Carreón sided with Andrés Bonifacio after the latter was accused of treason and even testified on his behalf. Despite his actions, Bonifacio was executed and his role in the Revolution was sidelined until the start of the Filipino–American War.

=== Filipino–American War ===
After Emilio Aguinaldo surrendered to the United States, Carreón along with Macario Sakay and Lope K. Santos, among others, formed the Nacionalista Party (unrelated to the current Nacionalista Party since it was outlawed).

Sakay then took to the hills and established the Tagalog Republic, with Carreón serving as both Sakay's vice president and executive secretary. The group would continue the resistance against the Americans. On July 14, 1906, during the establishment of the Philippine National Assembly, the group, along with Carreón, entered Manila and was unharmed by the American officials. Later, they were invited to a town fiesta in Cavite. This turned out to be a trap and the band was tried for banditry and were incarcerated in the old Bilibid Prison. On August 6, Carreón was sentenced to life in prison while Sakay was hanged on September 13. He was later released in 1930 after being pardoned. Carreón died between 1939 and 1941, during World War II. There is no information about his later life and maybe he was presumed to have died of tuberculosis.

Political offices
| Preceded by Mariano Trías | Vice President of the Philippines; May 6, 1902 - July 14, 1906 | Vacant Office abolished; Restored in the Philippine Commonwealth Title next held by Sergio Osmeña |
