= Diwa de Leon =

Filipino composer and musician (born 1980)

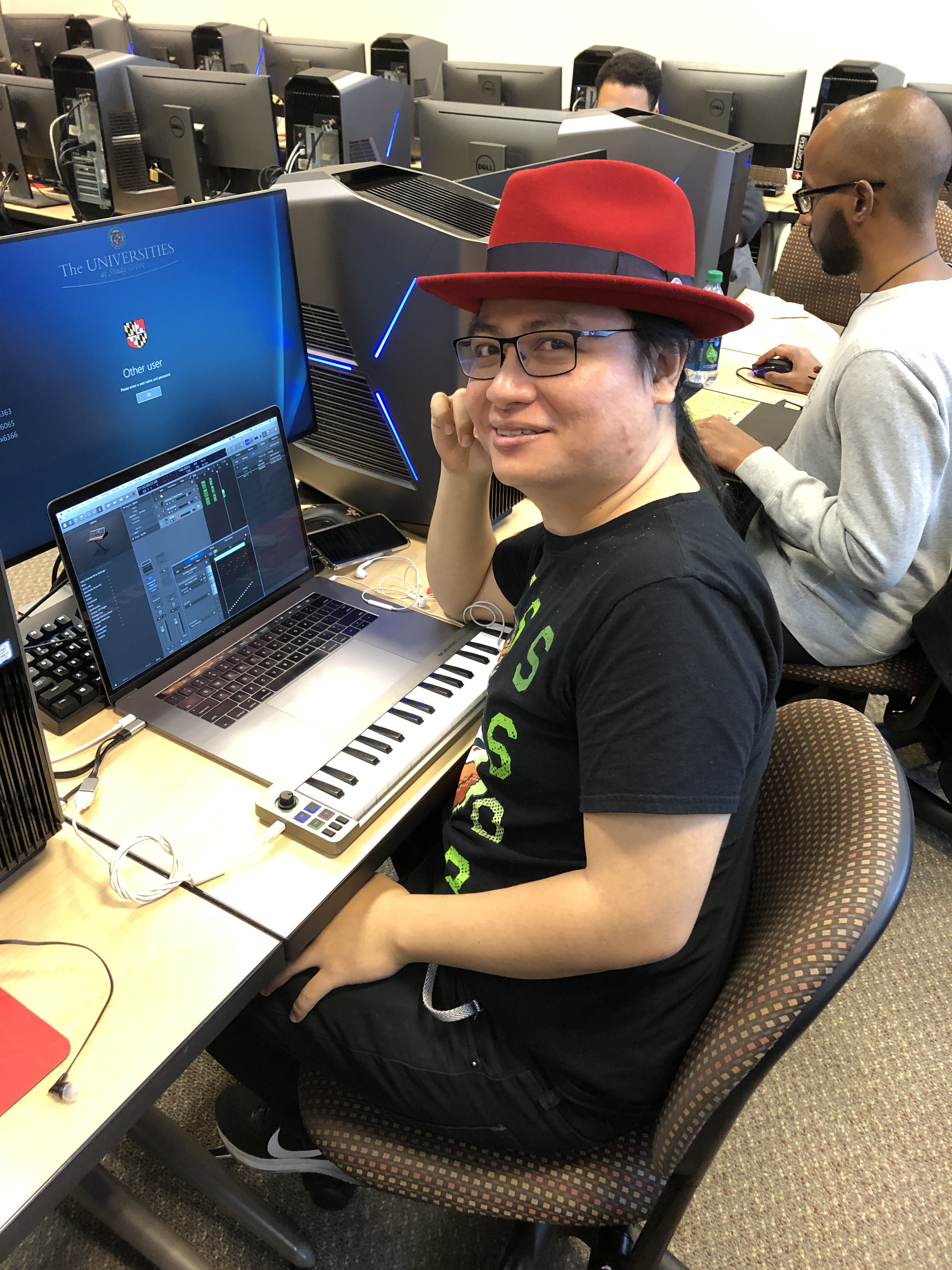
- de Leon in 2019
- Born: 1980 (age 45–46); Manila, Philippines
- Occupation: Composer
- Known for: Scores in film, television, and games
- Notable work: Music in Survivor Philippines

YouTube information
- Channel: Lionmight
- Years active: 2006–present
- Genre: Music
- Subscribers: 432 thousand
- Views: 75 million
- Last updated: 25 thousand

Diwa de Leon (born 1980) is a Filipino composer, arranger and musician based in Maryland, United States. He makes music mainly for television shows, films, and stage productions, with his most notable work the arrangement of GMA Network's Survivor Philippines theme music. His songs have been included in multiple films such as Emir (2010). In 2008, he won the Cinema One Originals Best Musical Score award for his work on the film Kolorete and Best Music Score for Kamera Obskura at the 8th Cinemalaya Independent Film Festival. In 2018, he won the Outstanding Original Composition award for Ibong Adarna Ballet at the 10th Gawad Buhay Awards. He is a founding member of the world music group Makiling. His first mainstream film project was for Mamarazzi (2010), produced by Regal Films.

He has over 400,000 subscribers to his "Lionmight" YouTube channel, where he posts covers of video game and pop music as well as music reviews and reaction videos.

== Background ==
Born in 1980 in the Philippines, he came from a musical family. His father Felipe Mendoza de Leon Jr. is the former chairman of the National Commission for Culture and the Arts, a branch of the Philippine government, and his mother Anna Leah Sarabia is a Filipina writer and artist. His grandfather was composer and National Artist Felipe Padilla de Leon. With his mother's urging, Diwa learned the violin from an early age. In 1996, he was strongly influenced by the music of Joey Ayala, and he began playing the traditional instrument the hegalong.

De Leon attended the Philippine High School for the Arts in Makiling, and the University of the Philippines. In 1997, along with some high school friends, he formed a band, the Makiling Ensemble, which released three albums from 2000 to 2005, and composed the music for the film Pandanggo (2006). He then wrote music for the film Kolorete (2008), and won "Best Original Score" in that year's Cinema One film festival.

In 2014, he appeared in an interview with Mitzi Borromeo on News Cafe Episode 75, where he talked about his musical family background, upbringing, passion for the hegalong, his band Makiling Ensemble and being a content creator on Youtube as String Player Gamer.
