= Kamera Obskura =

- Film poster
- Directed by: Raymond Red
- Written by: Raymond Red; Pen Medina
- Produced by: Raymond Red
- Cinematography: Raymond Red
- Edited by: Raymond Red; Pablo Biglang-Awa
- Music by: Diwa de Leon
- Production companies: Pelikula Red; Filmex
- Release date: July 21, 2012 (Cinemalaya)
- Running time: 83 minutes
- Country: Philippines
- Language: Silent (Tagalog intertitles)

Kamera Obskura is a 2012 Philippine drama film produced and directed by Raymond Red. It was co-written by Red and Pen Medina, who stars as the protagonist of a fictional silent lost film recovered by film archivists.

== Plot ==
Film archivists uncover a lost Filipino black-and-white silent film about an escaped convict who uses a magic camera to help the people of a small town. After showing the 70-minute film, the archivists debate its significance and the best way to preserve Filipino cinema.

== Cast ==
- Pen Medina as Juan, star of the lost silent film
- Joel Torre
- Nanding Josef
- Abe Pagtama
- Suzette Ranillo
- Ping Medina
- Irene Gabriel
- Lou Veloso
- Bert Habal
- Archie Adamos
- Madlen Nicolas
- Teddy Co
- Cesar Hernando
- Ricky Orellana

== Production ==
Red was influenced by Metropolis and Zelig. Red says that he had not seen The Artist prior to filming.

== Release ==
Kamera Obskura premiered at the 8th Cinemalaya Independent Film Festival on July 21, 2012.

== Reception ==
Richard Kuipers of Variety wrote that Red "succeeds marvelously in conceptual and visual terms, but his soundtrack strategy is likely to sharply divide audiences". Oggs Cruz of Twitch Film criticized both the score and the fictional film-within-a-film but called the concept "utterly brilliant".

Kamera Obskura won Best Original Music Score, Best Direction, and Special Jury Prize at Cinemalaya.
