= 2000 Cannes Film Festival =

- Official poster of the 53rd Cannes Film Festival featuring an original illustration by Italian artist Lorenzo Mattotti.
- Opening film: Vatel
- Closing film: Stardom
- Location: Cannes, France
- Founded: 1946
- Awards: Palme d'Or: Dancer in the Dark
- Hosted by: Virginie Ledoyen
- No. of films: 23 (In Competition)
- Festival date: 14 May 2000 – 25 May 2000
- Website: festival-cannes.com/en

Cannes Film Festival
- 2001 1999

The 53rd Cannes Film Festival took place from 14 to 25 May 2000. French filmmaker Luc Besson was the Jury President for the main competition. Virginie Ledoyen was the mistress of ceremonies. Danish filmmaker Lars von Trier won the Palme d'Or for the musical-drama film Dancer in the Dark.

The festival opened with Vatel by Roland Joffé, and closed with Stardom by Denys Arcand.

2000 Un Certain Regard poster featuring a still of Audrey Hepburn in Sabrina by Bud Fraker

== Juries ==
=== Main competition ===
- Luc Besson, French filmmaker - Jury President
- Jonathan Demme, American filmmaker
- Nicole Garcia, French actress
- Jeremy Irons, British actor
- Mario Martone, Italian filmmaker
- Patrick Modiano, French novelist
- Arundhati Roy, Indian author
- Aitana Sánchez-Gijón, Spanish actress
- Barbara Sukowa, German actress
- Kristin Scott Thomas, British actress

=== Un Certain Regard ===
- Jane Birkin, British-French actress
- Jan Schulz-Ojala
- José Maria Prado, Director of the Filmoteca Española
- Marie-Noëlle Tranchant, critic
- Noël Tinazzi, critic
- Marc Voinchet, critic

=== Cinéfondation and Short Films Competition ===
- Jean-Pierre Dardenne, Belgian filmmaker - Jury Co-president
- Luc Dardenne, Belgian filmmaker - Jury Co-president
- Francesca Comencini, Italian filmmaker
- Claire Denis, French filmmaker
- Abderrahmane Sissako, Mauritanian filmmaker
- Mira Sorvino, American actress

=== Camera d'Or ===
- Otar Iosseliani, Georgian filmmaker - Jury President
- Sólveig Anspach, Icelandic-French director
- Yorgos Arvanitis, Greek cinematographer
- Fabienne Bradfer, French critic
- Martial Knaebel, German critic
- Eric Moulin, French representative of the technical industries
- Céline Panzolini, French cinephile
- Caroline Vie-Toussaint, French journalist

== Official selection ==
=== In Competition ===
The following feature films competed for the Palme d'Or:

English title	Original title	Director(s)	Production country
Bread and Roses		Ken Loach	United Kingdom, Spain, Germany
Blackboards	تخته سیاه	Samira Makhmalbaf	Iran, Italy, Japan
Chunhyang	춘향뎐	Kwon-taek Im	South Korea
Code Unknown	Code inconnu: Récit incomplet de divers voyages	Michael Haneke	France, Germany, Romania
Dancer in the Dark		Lars von Trier	Denmark, France, Germany, Italy, Sweden, United Kingdom, United States
Devils on the Doorstep	鬼子來了	Jiang Wen	China
Esther Kahn		Arnaud Desplechin	France, United Kingdom
Eureka		Shinji Aoyama	Japan
Faithless	Trolösa	Liv Ullmann	Sweden
Fast Food Fast Women		Amos Kollek	France
Gohatto	御法度	Nagisa Oshima	Japan
The Golden Bowl		James Ivory	United Kingdom, United States, France
Harry, He's Here to Help	Harry, un ami qui vous veut du bien	Dominik Moll	France
In the Mood for Love	花樣年華	Wong Kar-wai	Hong Kong, France
Kippur	כיפור	Amos Gitai	Israel
Nurse Betty		Neil LaBute	United States
O Brother, Where Art Thou?		Joel Coen	United Kingdom, United States, France
Sentimental Destinies	Les Destinées sentimentales	Olivier Assayas	France, Switzerland
Songs from the Second Floor	Sånger från andra våningen	Roy Andersson	Sweden, Norway, Denmark
Turbulence	Estorvo	Ruy Guerra	Brazil, Cuba, Portugal
The Wedding	Свадьба	Pavel Lungin	Russia, France
The Yards		James Gray	United States
Yi Yi	Yī Yī	Edward Yang	Taiwan, Japan

=== Un Certain Regard ===
The following films were selected for the competition of Un Certain Regard:

English title	Original title	Director(s)	Production country
April Captains	Capitães de Abril	Maria de Medeiros	Portugal, France, Spain, Italy
Djomeh		Hassan Yektapanah	Iran
The Farewell	Abschied - Brechts letzter Sommer	Jan Schütte	Germany
I Dreamed of Africa		Hugh Hudson	United States
I Prefer the Sound of the Sea	Preferisco il rumore del mare	Mimmo Calopresti	Italy, France
Jacky		Brat Ljatifi and Fow Pyng Hu	United States
The King Is Alive		Kristian Levring	Denmark
The King's Daughters	Saint-Cyr	Patricia Mazuy	France, Belgium, Germany
Lisa Picard Is Famous		Griffin Dunne	United States
Lost Killers		Dito Tsintsadze	Germany
Me You Them	Eu Tu Eles	Andrucha Waddington	Brazil
Nichiyobi wa Owaranai	日曜日は終わらない	Yōichirō Takahashi	Japan
Le premier du nom		Sabine Franel	France, Switzerland
The Season of Men	موسم الرجال	Moufida Tlatli	Tunisia, France
Such Is Life	Así es la vida	Arturo Ripstein	Mexico
Things You Can Tell Just by Looking at Her		Rodrigo García	United States
Tierra del Fuego		Miguel Littin	Chile
The Vertical Ray of the Sun	Mùa hè chiều thẳng đứng	Tran Anh Hung	France, Germany, Vietnam
Virgin Stripped Bare by Her Bachelors	오! 수정	Hong Sang-soo	South Korea
The Waiting List	Lista de espera	Juan Carlos Tabío	Spain, Cuba, France, Mexico
Wild Blues: Notes for Several Voices	Wild Blue: notes à quelques voix	Thierry Knauff	Belgium
Woman on Top		Fina Torres	United States

=== Out of Competition ===
The following films were selected to be screened out of competition:

English title	Original title	Director(s)	Production country
April (1961)	აპრილი	Otar Iosseliani	Soviet Union
A Conversation with Gregory Peck		Barbara Kopple	United States
Cecil B. Demented		John Waters	United States, France
Crouching Tiger, Hidden Dragon	臥虎藏龍	Ang Lee	China, Taiwan, Hong Kong, United States
Honest		David Stewart	United Kingdom, France
The Gleaners and I	Les glaneurs et la glaneuse	Agnès Varda	France
Mission to Mars		Brian De Palma	United States
Requiem for a Dream		Darren Aronofsky	United States
Stardom (closing film)		Denys Arcand	Canada, France
Under Suspicion		Stephen Hopkins	United States, France, Puerto Rico
Vatel (opening film)		Roland Joffé	United Kingdom, France

=== Cinéfondation ===
The following films were selected for the competition of Cinéfondation:

- Ascension by Malgoska Szumowska (Poland)
- Course de nuit by Chuyên Bui Thac (Vietnam)
- De janela pro cinema by Quia Rodrígues (Brazil)
- Dessert by (Kinu'ach) Amit Sakomski (Israel)
- Don't Miss the Killer (Mi sas xefygei o dolofonos) by Anastas Haralampidis (Greece)
- Five Feet High and Rising by Peter Sollett (United States)
- Indien by Pernille Fischer Christensen (Denmark)
- Kiss It Up to God by Caran Hartsfield (United States)
- Le vent souffle où il veut by Claire Doyon (France)
- Leben 1, 2, 3 by Michael Schorr (Germany)
- Nocturnal by Anna Viduleja (Latvia)
- Breathing Under Water (Respirar (Debaixo d'água)) by António Ferreira (Portugal)
- Shoot the Dog by Ariko Kimura (Japan)

=== Short Film Competition ===
The following short films competed for the Short Film Palme d'Or:

- 3 Minutes by Ana Luiza Azevedo
- Shadows (Anino) by Raymond Red- Short Film Palme d'Or winner
- Des morceaux de ma femme by Frédéric Pelle
- Shut the Door (Døren som ikke smakk) by Jens Lien
- Mieux ou moins bien ? (Better or Worse) by Jocelyn Cammack
- Stop by Anthony Mullins

== Parallel sections ==
=== International Critics' Week ===
The following films were screened for the 39th International Critics' Week (39e Semaine de la Critique):

Feature film competition

- Amores perros by Alejandro González Iñárritu (Mexico)
- Hidden Whisper by Vivian Chang (Taiwan)
- Krampack by Cesc Gay (Spain)
- De l'histoire ancienne by Orso Miret (France)
- Good Housekeeping by Frank Novak (United States)
- Happy End by Jung Ji-woo (South Korea)
- Les Autres filles by Caroline Vignal (France)

Short film competition

- Faux contact by Eric Jameux (France)
- To Be Continued... by Linus Tunström (Sweden)
- The Hat (Le Chapeau) by Michèle Cournoyer (Canada)
- Les méduses by Delphine Gleize (France)
- The Artist's Circle by Bruce Marchfelder (Canada)
- Not I by Neil Jordan (Ireland, United Kingdom)
- Le Dernier rêve by Emmanuel Jespers (Belgium)

=== Directors' Fortnight ===
The following films were screened for the 2000 Directors' Fortnight (Quinzaine des Réalizateurs):

- 27 Missing Kisses by Nana Djordjadze
- L'Affaire Marcorelle by Serge Le Péron
- La Captive by Chantal Akerman
- Cuba Feliz by Karim Dridi
- Billy Elliot (Dancer) by Stephen Daldry
- Bread and Tulips (Pane e tulipani) by Silvio Soldini
- La Chambre obscure by Marie-Christine Questerbert
- Downtown 81 by Edo Bertoglio
- En avant ! (director not stated, 60 min.)
- Faites comme si je n’étais pas là by Olivier Jahan
- Film noir (Koroshi) by Masahiro Kobayashi
- Girlfight by Karyn Kusama
- Grüezi wohl Frau Stirnimaa by Sonja Wyss
- Jocelyne by Valérie Mréjen
- Le Secret by Virginie Wagon
- Lumumba by Raoul Peck
- Mallboy by Vincent Giarrusso
- No Place to Go (Die Unberührbare) by Oskar Roehler
- Peppermint Candy by Lee Chang-dong
- Petite Chérie by Anne Villacèque
- Purely Belter by Mark Herman
- Shadow of the Vampire by E. Elias Merhige
- Some Voices by Simon Cellan Jones
- The Three Madeleines (Les fantômes des Trois Madeleine) by Guylaine Dionne
- A Time for Drunken Horses (Zamani barayé masti asbha) by Bahman Ghobadi
- Tout va bien, on s’en va by Claude Mouriéras
- Werckmeister Harmoniak by Béla Tarr

Short films

- A corps perdu by Isabelle Broué (France)
- C’est bien la société by Valérie Pavia (France)
- C'est pas si compliqué by Xavier De Choudens (France)
- Derailed - extract from Phœnix Tape by Christoph Girardet, Matthias Müller (Germany)
- Des larmes de sang by Valérie Mréjen (France)
- Elisabeth by Valérie Mréjen (France)
- Ferment by Tim Macmillan (Great Britain)
- Flying Boys by Didier Seynave (Belgium)
- Furniture Poetry (and Other Rhymes for the Camera) by Paul Bush (Great Britain)
- Ghost by Steve Hawley (Great Britain)
- Grüezi Wohl Fraü Stirnimaa... or Malou möter Ingmar Bergman och Erland Josephson by Sonja Wyss (Switzerland - Netherlands)
- Head Stand by Lisa Robinson (United States)
- In Absentia by Brothers Quay (Great Britain)
- Jocelyne by Valérie Mréjen (France)
- La Brèche de Roland by Arnaud & Jean-Marie Larrieu
- La Poire by Valérie Mréjen (France)
- La Pomme, la Figue et l’Amande by Joël Brisse
- La Vie heureuse by Valérie Pavia (France)
- Le mur by Faouzi Bensaïdi (France)
- Les Oiseaux en cage ne peuvent pas voler by Luis Briceño (France)
- Look at Me by Peter Stel (Netherlands)
- Love is All by Oliver Harrison (Great Britain)
- L'Epouvantail or Pugalo by Alexander Kott (Russia)
- Collision Course by Roberval Duarte (Brazil)
- Rue Francis by François Vogel (France)
- Salam by Souad El-Bouhati (France)
- Still Life by Pekka Sassi (Finland)
- The Morphology of Desire by Robert Arnold (United States)

== Official Awards ==
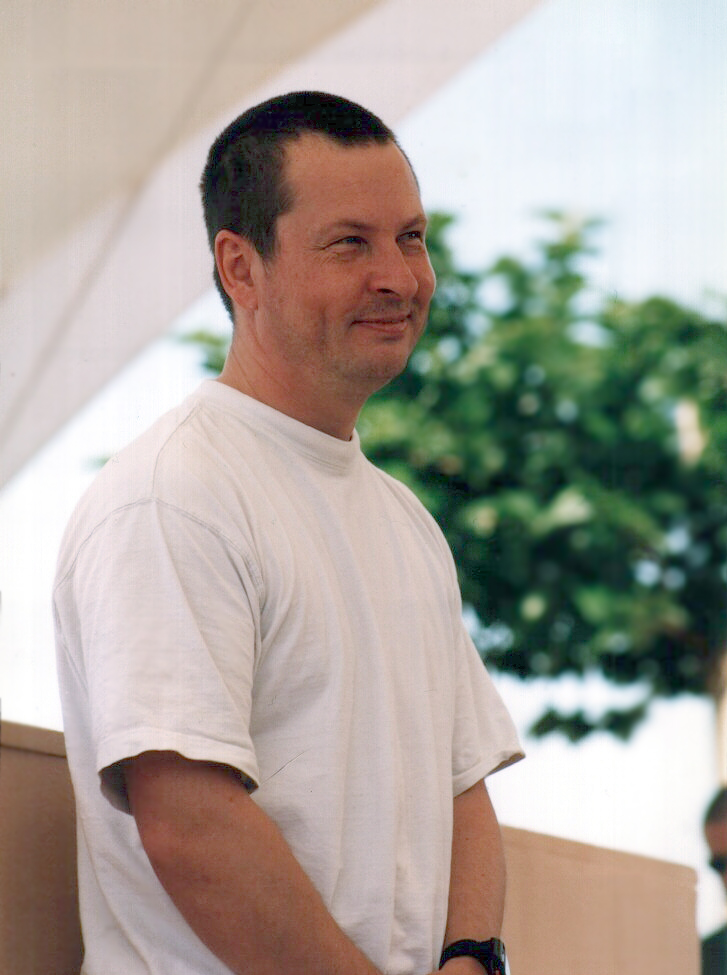
Lars Von Trier, winner of the Palme d'Or at the event

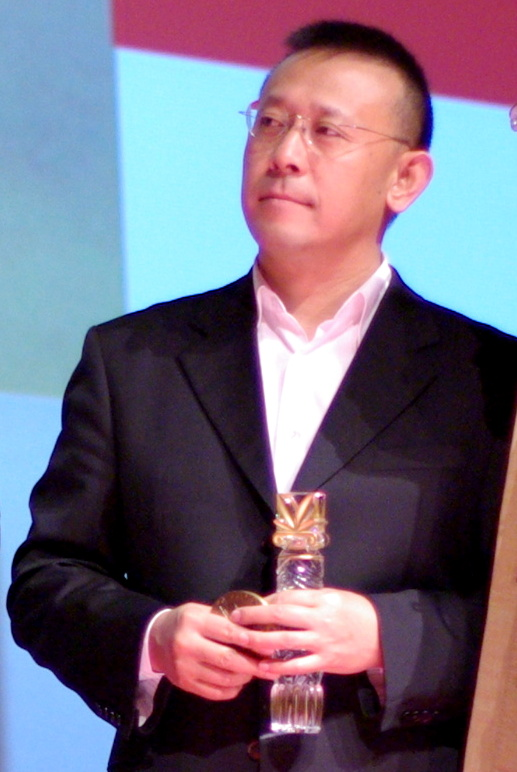
Jiang Wen, Gran Prix winner

=== Main Competition ===
- Palme d'Or: Dancer in the Dark by Lars von Trier
- Grand Prix: Devils on the Doorstep by Jiang Wen
- Best Director: Edward Yang for Yi Yi
- Best Screenplay: Nurse Betty by James Flamberg and John C. Richards
- Best Actress: Björk for Dancer in the Dark
- Best Actor: Tony Leung Chiu-wai for In the Mood for Love
- Jury Prize:
  - Songs from the Second Floor by Roy Andersson
  - Blackboards by Samira Makhmalbaf

=== Un Certain Regard ===
- Things You Can Tell Just by Looking at Her by Rodrigo Garcia
  - Special Mention: Me You Them by Andrucha Waddington

=== Cinéfondation ===
- First Prize: Five Feet High and Rising by Peter Sollett
- Second Prize:
  - Dessert by Amit Sakomski
  - Kiss It Up to God by Caran Hartsfield
- Third Prize:
  - Course de nuit by Chuyên Bui Thac
  - Indien by Pernille Fischer Christensen

=== Caméra d'Or ===
- Djomeh by Hassan Yektapanah
- A Time for Drunken Horses by Bahman Ghobadi

=== Short Film Palme d'Or ===
- Shadows by Raymond Red

== Independent Awards ==
=== FIPRESCI Prizes ===
- Eureka by Shinji Aoyama (In competition)
- A Time for Drunken Horses by Bahman Ghobadi (Directors' Fortnight)

=== Commission Supérieure Technique ===
- Technical Grand Prize: Christopher Doyle & Mark Lee Ping Bin (cinematography) and William Chang (editing) for In the Mood for Love

=== Prize of the Ecumenical Jury ===
- Eureka by Shinji Aoyama

=== Award of the Youth ===
- Foreign Film: Girlfight by Karyn Kusama
- French Film: The King's Daughters by Patricia Mazuy
  - Special Award: Nico and Dani by Cesc Gay

=== International Critics' Week ===
- Canal+ Award: To Be Continued... by Linus Tunström
- Young Critics Award - Best Short: Faux contact by Eric Jameux
- Young Critics Award - Best Feature: Amores perros by Alejandro González Iñárritu

=== Directors' Fortnight ===
- Kodak Short Film Award: Salam by Souad El-Bouhati
- Kodak Short Film Award - Special Mention: C'est pas si compliqué by Xavier De Choudens
- Gras Savoye Award: Le mur by Faouzi Bensaïdi

=== François Chalais Award ===
- Kippur by Amos Gitai

== Media ==
- INA: Opening of the 2000 Festival (commentary in French)
- INA: List of winners of the 2000 festival and interviews (commentary in French)
