= Macario Sakay =

Filipino general, merchant and revolutionary (1870–1907)

His Excellency Macario Sakay

President of the Tagalog Republic
- In office May 6, 1902 – July 14, 1905
- Vice President: Francisco Carreón

Personal details
- Born: Macario Sakay y de León; March 1, 1870 (Note: Some sources claim that Macario Sakay was born in 1870. However, as his death certificate recorded his age as 29 at his time of death in 1907, this article uses 1878 as his birth date.) Tondo, Manila, Captaincy General of the Philippines, Spanish Empire
- Died: September 13, 1907 (aged 37) Santa Cruz, Manila, Insular Government of the Philippine Islands, U.S.
- Party: Katipunan
- Profession: Revolutionary; Merchant

Macario Sakay y de León (March 1, 1870 – September 13, 1907) was a Filipino general who took part in the 1896 Philippine Revolution against the Spanish Empire and in the Philippine–American War. After the war was declared over by the United States in 1902, Sakay continued resistance by leading guerrilla raids. The following year he established the Tagalog Republic with himself as president. Sakay was executed by hanging in 1907.

== Early life ==
Macario Sakay de León was born on March 1, 1870, along Tabora Street, Tondo, in the City of Manila. He first worked as an apprentice in a kalesa (carriage) manufacturing shop. He was also a tailor and a stage actor, performing in a number of plays including Principe Baldovino, Doce Pares de Francia, and Amante de la Corona.

An original member of the Katipunan movement, which he joined in 1894, he fought alongside Andrés Bonifacio against the Spanish throughout the Philippine Revolution. In 1899, he continued the struggle for Philippine independence against the United States. Early in the Philippine–American War, he was jailed for seditious activities, and later released as part of an amnesty.

== After the war ==
Sakay was one of the founders of the Partido Nacionalista (unrelated to the present Nacionalista Party founded in 1907), which sought to achieve Philippine independence through legal means. The party appealed to the Philippine Commission, but the Commission passed the Sedition Law, which prohibited any form of propaganda advocating independence. Sakay took up arms again.

== After the capture of Aguinaldo ==
Contrary to popular belief, the Philippine resistance to American rule did not end with the capture of General Emilio Aguinaldo. Several forces remained at large, including one led by Sakay. Sakay's rank and association within Aguinaldo's Revolutionary Government is unknown. When Aguinaldo surrendered to the US, Sakay seized the leadership of the revolution and declared himself Supreme President of the Tagalog Republic. He said this included all the islands of the Philippines from Luzon to Mindanao. Taking over the Morong–Nueva Ecija command and assigning his deputies to take charge of the other Tagalog regions, Sakay wrote a constitution in which traitors, or supporters of the enemy, were to be punished with exile, imprisonment, or death. In May 1902, Sakay and his men declared open resistance to the US and conducted guerrilla raids that lasted for five years.

== Tagalog Republic ==
Around 1902, Sakay established the Tagalog Republic somewhere in the mountains of Rizal. His first military circulars and presidential orders as "President and Commander-in-Chief" were issued in 1903. Sakay's military circular No. 1 was dated May 5, 1903, and his Presidential Order No. 1 was dated March 18, 1903.

=== Military organization ===
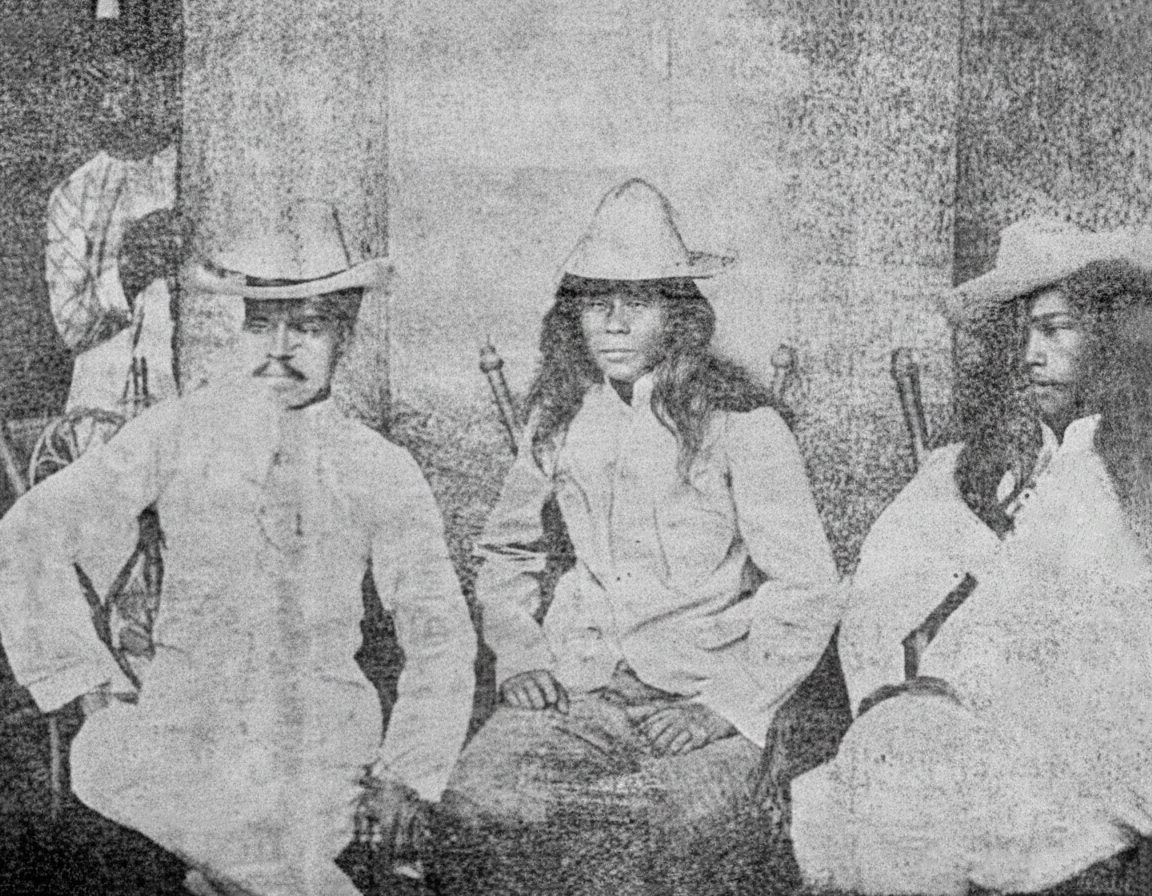
In 1905, Sakay (center) with Francisco Carreón (right) and León Villafuerte (left) before he was captured by the Americans.

In Sakay's military circular No. 7, dated June 19, 1903, the government of the Tagalog Republic (called the "Republic of the Philippines") affirmed the formation of an organized army. The army units were composed of Kabohans (eight soldiers, equivalent to a squad), Camilleros (nine soldiers), Companias (117 soldiers, equivalent to a company, and Batalions (801 soldiers, equivalent to battalion). However, in Sakay's Second Manifesto, dated April 5, 1904, it said the exact number of soldiers in the army could not be ascertained. There are insufficient documents to provide a basis for historians to speculate on the size of the Republic's army, but these demonstrate that Sakay's army existed and that it was led by officers appointed and commissioned by Sakay himself.

In Sakay's presidential order No. 2, dated May 8, 1903, the government, in search of sources of weapons to carry out its struggle against the Americans, said that it was willing to confer military rank on citizens who could turn over firearms to the Presidential Office or any of the headquarters under its command. Ranks would be conferred by the following schedule: 10 to 15 firearms, rank of lieutenant; 16 to 25 firearms, captain; 26 to 36 firearms, major; 40 to 50 firearms, colonel. In Sakay's military order No. 5, dated May 25, 1903, the government assigned the following color codes for the divisions of its army: artillery (red), infantry (light blue), cavalry (dark blue), engineering (dark brown), chief-of-staff (dark green), sanitary (yellow), and marines (gray).

=== Planned kidnapping ===
According to General Leon Villafuerte, his, Carreon's and Sakay's forces planned to kidnap Alice Roosevelt Longworth, the daughter of President Theodore Roosevelt, who was planning to visit the Philippines. The plan was to trade her to the Americans in exchange for the immediate recognition of Philippine independence. The kidnapping was not attempted since Longworth postponed her trip by train to Baguio.

== Surrender and betrayal ==
In 1905, Filipino labour leader Dominador Gómez was authorised by Governor-General Henry Clay Ide to negotiate for the surrender of Sakay and his men. Gómez met with Sakay at his camp and argued that the establishment of a national assembly was being held up by Sakay's intransigence, and that its establishment would be the first step toward Filipino independence. Sakay agreed to end his resistance on the condition that a general amnesty be granted to his men, that they be permitted to carry firearms, and that he and his officers be permitted to leave the country. Gómez assured Sakay that these conditions would be acceptable to the Americans, and Sakay's emissary, General León Villafuerte, obtained agreement to them from the American Governor-General.

Sakay believed that the struggle had shifted to constitutional means, and that the establishment of the assembly was a means to win independence. As a result, he surrendered on July 14, 1905, descending from the mountains on the promise of an amnesty for him and his officials, and the formation of a Philippine Assembly composed of Filipinos that would serve as the "gate of freedom". With Villafuerte, Sakay travelled to Manila, where they were welcomed and invited to receptions and banquets.

One invitation came from the Constabulary Chief, American Colonel Harry H. Bandholtz, to a party in Cavite hosted by the acting governor Colonel Louis J. Van Schaick on July 17; it was a trap. Sakay and his principal lieutenants were disarmed and arrested while the party was in progress.

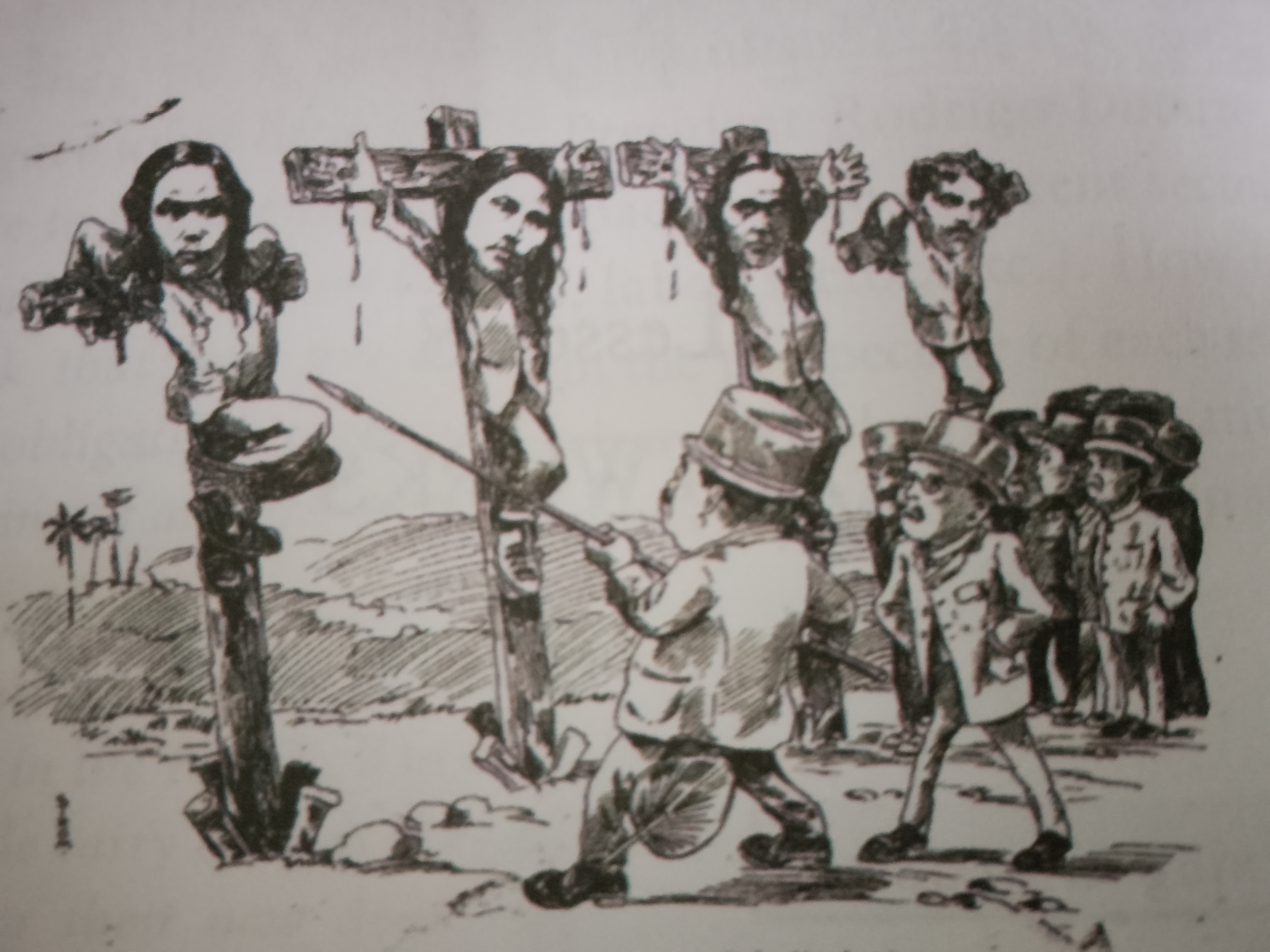
1907 satirical cartoon of Lipang Kalabaw (Lipag-Kalabaw) that depicts Dominador Gomez an assemblyman as Longinus, a Roman centurion, delivering final blows of spear to the crucified freedom fighters, (from the left) Macario Sakay, Francisco Carreon, Julian Montalban, and Lucio De Vega who were sentenced to death by the American government for banditry.

At his trial, Sakay was accused of bandolerismo "under the Brigandage Act of Nov. 12, 1902, which interpreted all acts of armed resistance to American rule as banditry." The American colonial Supreme Court of the Philippines upheld the decision. Sakay was convicted and sentenced to death, and hanged on September 13, 1907.

Before his death, he made the following statement:

Death comes to all of us sooner or later, so I will face the LORD Almighty calmly. But I want to tell you that we are not bandits and robbers, as the Americans have accused us, but members of the revolutionary force that defended our mother country, the Philippines! Farewell! Long live the Republic and may our independence be born in the future! Long live the Philippines!

He was buried at Manila North Cemetery later that day.

== Legacy ==
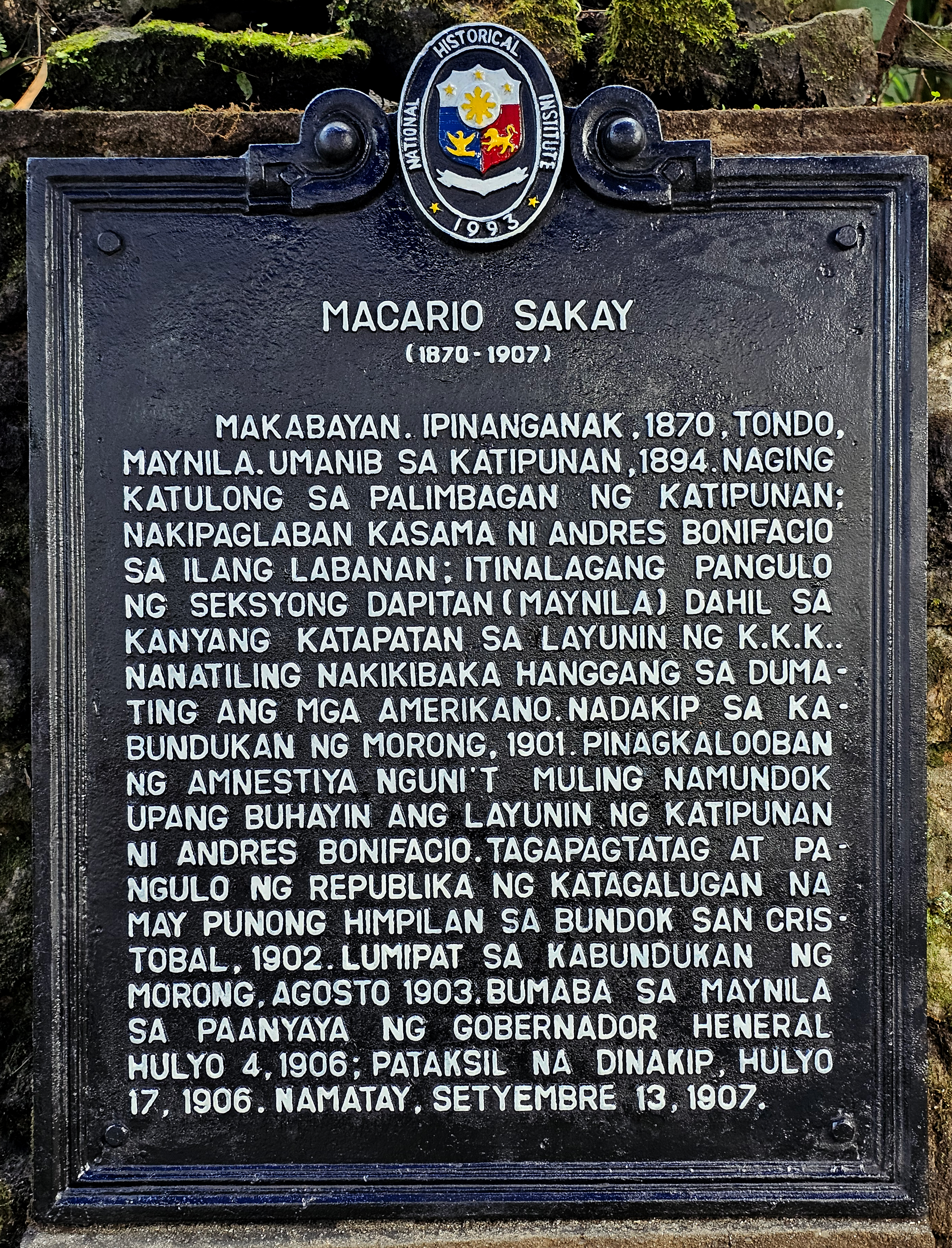
National historical marker installed in 1993 in Dolores, Quezon

- A life-sized statue of Sakay was unveiled at the Plaza Morga in Tondo, by the Manila Historical Heritage Commission on September 13, 2008, the 101st anniversary of his death. That same month, the Senate adopted two separate resolutions honouring Sakay's life and his fellow freedom fighters for their contribution to the cause of independence.
- Camp General Macario Sakay in Los Baños, Laguna was named after the general in January 2016, when Armed Forces of the Philippines Chief of Staff Gen. Hernando Iriberri issued General Order No. 30, changing the camp's name from Camp Eldridge, a name the camp had been given during the American occupation a century prior.

== In popular culture ==
- Sakay was noted for keeping long hair. His name is used in the Philippines to refer to persons needing a haircut.
- Portrayed by Salvador Zaragoza in the 1939 film Sakay.
- Portrayed by Julio Díaz in the 1993 film, Sakay.
- Portrayed by Dindo Arroyo in the 1997 TV series, Bayani and 2012 film, El Presidente.
- Portrayed by Jerald Napoles in the 2013 TV series, Katipunan.
- Portrayed by Remus Japitana Villanueva in the 2017 Tanghalang Pilipino musical, Aurelio Sedisyoso: A Rock Sarswela.

== See also ==
- List of unofficial presidents of the Philippines
- Tagalog Republic
