= Tagalog Republic =

Filipino revolutionary governments during the wars with the Spanish Empire and the U.S.

Sovereign Nation of the Tagalog People Republic of the Tagalog People Haring Bayang Katagalugan Republika ng Katagalugan
- 1896–1897
- Flag
- Anthem: Marangál na Dalit ng̃ Katagalugan ("Honorable Hymn of the Tagalog Nation")
- Status: Unrecognized state
- Common languages: Tagalog, Philippine languages
- Government: Revolutionary republic
- Supreme President (Kataas-taasang Pangulo) / President of the Sovereign Nation (Pangulo ng Haring Bayan)
  - 1896–1897: Andres C. Bonifacio
- Legislature: Kataas-taasang Sanggunian (Supreme Council)
- Historical era: Philippine Revolution
  - Cry of Pugad Lawin: 23 August 1896
  - Battle of Pinaglabanan: 30 August 1896
  - Siege of Imus: 1 September 1896
  - Execution of José Rizal: 30 December 1896
  - Imus Assembly: 31 December 1896
  - Tejeros Convention: 22 March 1897
  - Execution of Andrés Bonifacio: 10 May 1897
- Currency: Peso
Preceded by	Succeeded by
Captaincy General of the Philippines	Captaincy General of the Philippines; Tejeros Government
- Today part of: Philippines

Tagalog Republic (Filipino: Republikang Tagalog; Spanish: República Tagala) is a term used to refer to two revolutionary governments involved in the Philippine Revolution against the Spanish Empire and the Philippine–American War. Both were connected to the Katipunan revolutionary movement.

== Etymology ==
The term Tagalog commonly refers to both an ethno-linguistic group in the Philippines and their language. Katagalugan often refers to the Tagalog-speaking regions of the island of Luzon in the Philippine archipelago.

However, the Katipunan secret society extended the meaning of these terms to all of the natives in the Philippine islands. The society's primer explains its use of Tagalog in a footnote:

Original writing	Modern Manila Tagalog translation	English translation
Sa salitáng tagalog katutura’y ang lahát nang tumubo sa Sangkapuluáng itó; sa makatuid, bisaya man, iloko man, kapangpangan man, etc., ay tagalog din.	Ang salitang Tagalog ay tumutukoy sa lahat ng ipinanganak sa kapuluang ito; samakatuwid, Bisaya man, Ilokano man, Kapampangan man, etc. ay Tagalog din.	The word Tagalog refers to all of those born in this archipelago; therefore, even Visayans, Ilocanos, Kapampangans, etc. are also Tagalogs.

The revolutionary Carlos Ronquillo wrote in his memoirs:

Original writing	Modern Manila Tagalog translation	English translation
Ang tagalog o lalong malinaw, ang tawag na "tagalog" ay waláng ibáng kahulugán kundi ‘tagailog’ na sa tuwirang paghuhulo ay taong maibigang manirá sa tabíng ilog, bagay na 'di maikakaila na siyáng talagáng hilig ng tanang anák ng Pilipinas, saa’t saán mang pulo at bayan.	Ang Tagalog o lalong malinaw, ang tawag na "Tagalog" ay walang ibang kahulugan kundi 'taga-ilog' na sa tuwirang pinanggalingan ay taong mahilig tumira sa tabing ilog, bagay na 'di maitatanggi na siyang talagang hilig ng lahat ng anak ng Pilipinas, saan mang pulo (o isla) at bayan.	Tagalog, or more precisely, the name "Tagalog", has no other meaning but tagailog which, directly to its root, refers to those who prefer to settle along rivers, truly a trait that cannot be denied to all those who are the children of the Philippines, in whichever island and town.

In this respect, Katagalugan may be translated as the "Tagalog nation."

Andrés Bonifacio, a founding member of the Katipunan and later its supreme head (Supremo), promoted the use of Katagalugan for the Philippine nation. The term "Filipino" was then reserved for Spaniards born in the islands. By eschewing "Filipino" and "Filipinas" which had colonial roots, Bonifacio and his cohorts "sought to form a national identity."

In 1896, the Philippine Revolution broke out after the discovery of the Katipunan by the authorities. Prior to the outbreak of hostilities, the Katipunan had become an open revolutionary government. The American historian John R. M. Taylor, custodian of the Philippine Insurgent Records, wrote:

The Katipunan came out from the cover of secret designs, threw off the cloak of any other purpose, and stood openly for the independence of the Philippines. Bonifacio turned his lodges into battalions, his grandmasters into captains, and the supreme council of the Katipunan into the insurgent government of the Philippines.

Several Filipino historians concur. According to Gregorio Zaide:

The Katipunan was more than a secret revolutionary society; it was, withal, a Government. It was the intention of Bonifacio to have the Katipunan govern the whole Philippines after the overthrow of Spanish rule.

Likewise, Renato Constantino and others wrote that the Katipunan served as a shadow government.

Influenced by Freemasonry, the Katipunan had been organized with "its own laws, bureaucratic structure and elective leadership". For each province it involved, the Supreme Council coordinated provincial councils which were in charge of "public administration and military affairs on the supra-municipal or quasi-provincial level" and local councils, in charge of affairs "on the district or barrio level".

== Bonifacio ==
In the last days of August 1896, Katipunan members met in Caloocan and decided to start their revolt (the event was later called the "Cry of Balintawak" or "Cry of Pugad Lawin"; the exact location and date are disputed). A day after the Cry, the Supreme Council of the Katipunan held elections, with the following results:

Position	Name
Supreme President ( Kataas-taasang Pangulo, Presidente Supremo)	Andres C. Bonifacio
Secretary of War	Teodoro Plata
Secretary of State	Emilio Jacinto
Secretary of the Interior	Aguedo del Rosario
Secretary of Justice	Briccio Pantas
Secretary of Finance	Enrique Pacheco

The above was divulged to the Spanish by the Katipunan member Pío Valenzuela while in captivity. Teodoro Agoncillo thus wrote:

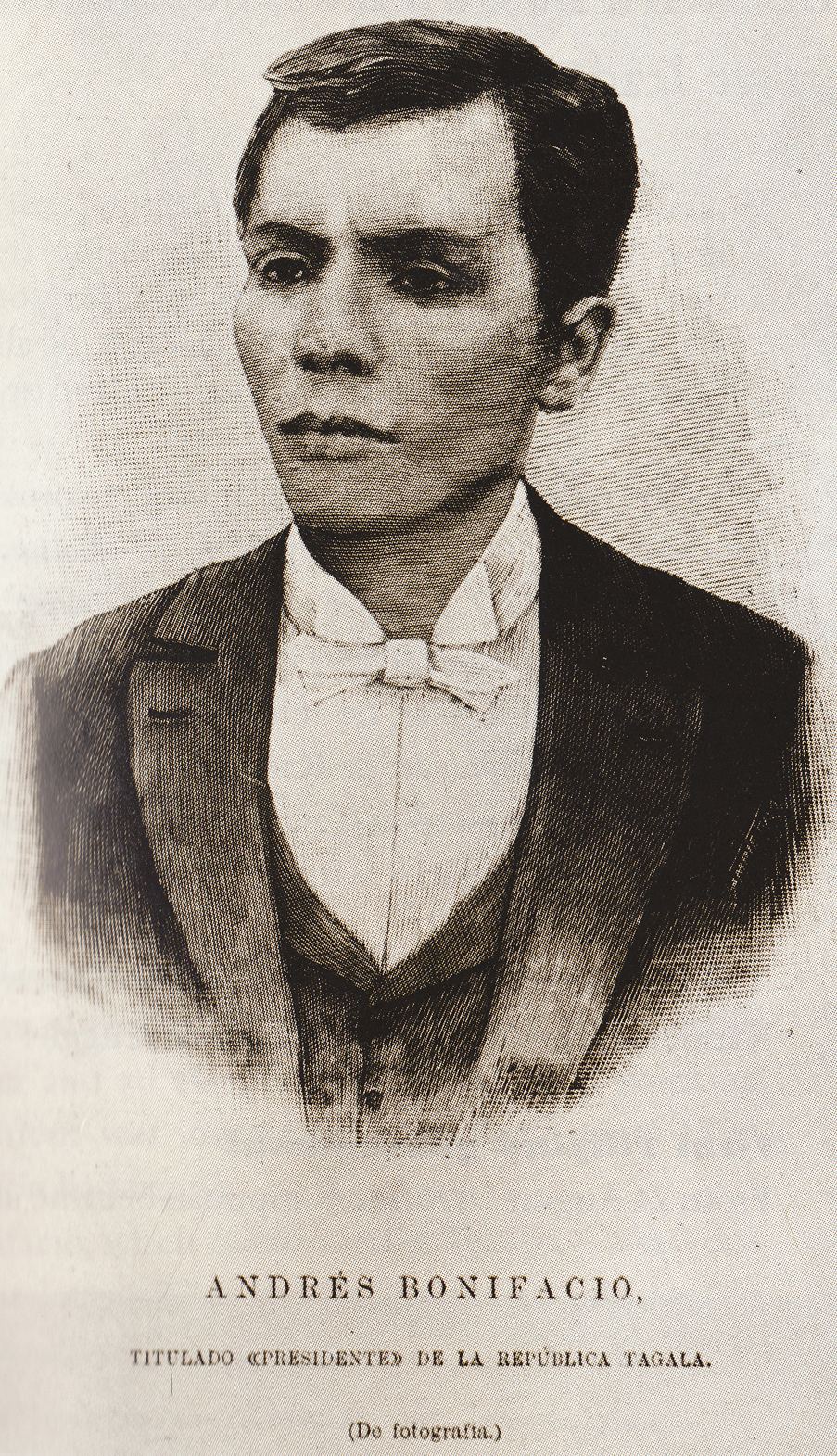
"Presidente" Bonifacio in La Ilustración Española y Americana, February 8, 1897

Immediately before the outbreak of the revolution, therefore, Bonifacio organized the Katipunan into a government revolving around a ‘cabinet’ composed of men of his confidence.

Milagros C. Guerrero and others have described Bonifacio as "effectively" the commander-in-chief of the revolutionaries. They assert:

As commander-in-chief, Bonifacio supervised the planning of military strategies and the preparation of orders, manifests and decrees, adjudicated offenses against the nation, as well as mediated in political disputes. He directed generals and positioned troops in the fronts. On the basis of command responsibility, all victories and defeats all over the archipelago during his term of office should be attributed to Bonifacio.

One name for Bonifacio's concept of the Philippine nation-state appears in surviving Katipunan documents: Haring Bayang Katagalugan ("Sovereign Nation of the Tagalog People", or "Sovereign Tagalog Nation") - sometimes shortened into Haring Bayan ("Sovereign Nation"). Bayan may be rendered as "nation" or "people". The term haring bayan (sometimes haringbayan) was Bonifacio's neologism which sought to express and adapt in native terms the Western concept of "republic", from Latin res publica, meaning public thing or commonwealth. Since haring bayan means both "sovereign nation" and "sovereign people", where sovereign power is held by the nation/people, his concept was essentially democratic and republican in nature.

Thus Bonifacio is named as the president of the "Tagalog Republic" in an issue of the Spanish periodical La Ilustración Española y Americana published in February 1897 ("Andrés Bonifacio - Titulado "Presidente" de la República Tagala"). Another name for Bonifacio's government was Repúblika ng Katagalugan (another form of "Tagalog Republic") as evidenced by a picture of a rebel seal published in the same periodical the next month.

Official letters and one appointment paper of Bonifacio addressed to Emilio Jacinto reveal Bonifacio's various titles and designations, as follows:

- President of the Supreme Council
- Supreme President
- President of the Sovereign Nation of Katagalugan / Sovereign Tagalog Nation
- President of the Sovereign Nation, Founder of the Katipunan, Initiator of the Revolution
- Office of the Supreme President, Government of the Revolution

Republic of the Tagalog Nation Republic of the Archipelago of the Tagalog Nation Republika ng Katagalugan Republika ng Kapuluang Katagalugan
- 1902–1906
- Flag Coat of arms
- Anthem: Marangal na Dalit ng Katagalugan
- Status: Unrecognized state
- Capital: Morong
- Government: Provisional government
- President
  - 1902–1906: Macario Sakay
- Vice President
  - 1902–1906: Francisco Carreón
- Historical era: Philippine–American War
  - Declaration of Independence: 6 May 1902
  - Surrender of Macario Sakay: 14 July 1906
Preceded by	Succeeded by
United States Military Government of the Philippine Islands	Insular Government of the Philippine Islands
- Today part of: Philippines

An 1897 power struggle at the Imus Assembly in Cavite led to command of the revolution shifting at the Tejeros Convention, where a new insurgent government was formed with Emilio Aguinaldo as president. Bonifacio refused to recognize the new government after his election as Director of the Interior was questioned by Daniel Tirona. This led to the Acta de Tejeros, the Naic Military Agreement and Bonifacio's trial and execution.

== Sakay ==
After Emilio Aguinaldo and his men were captured by the US forces in 1901, General Macario Sakay, a veteran Katipunan member, re-established in 1902 the Tagalog Republic (Tagalog: Republika ng Katagalugan, or Republika ng Kapuluang Katagalugan, kapuluan referring to the entire Philippine archipelago, as in "Philippine Islands" or "Islas Filipinas") as a continuation of Bonifacio's Katipunan government in contrast to Aguinaldo's Republic. Sakay was based in the mountains of Morong (today, the province of Rizal), and held the presidency with Francisco Carreón as vice president. In April 1904, Sakay issued a manifesto declaring Filipino right to self-determination at a time when support for independence was considered a crime by the American colonial government.

Position	Name
Supreme President	Macario Sakay
Vice President	Francisco Carreón
Minister of War	Domingo Moriones
Minister of the Government	Alejandro Santiago
Minister of State	Nicolás Rivera

The republic ended in 1906 when Sakay and his leading followers surrendered on July 14 to the American authorities upon being promised amnesty and being convinced of the need for a Philippine Assembly as a peaceful "gate to liberty". Instead they were arrested days later at a welcoming reception party in Cavite, imprisoned at the Old Bilibid Prison in Manila, and the following year executed for banditry. Some of its survivors escaped to Japan to be joined with Artemio Ricarte, an exiled Katipunan veteran, who later returned to support the Second Philippine Republic, a client state of Japan, during World War II.

== See also ==
- Tejeros revolutionary government
- List of unofficial presidents of the Philippines
