= List of The One That Got Away episodes =

The One That Got Away is a 2018 Philippine romantic comedy series starring Dennis Trillo, Rhian Ramos, Lovi Poe and Max Collins. The series premiered on GMA Network's GMA Telebabad evening block and worldwide via GMA Pinoy TV on January 15, 2018, to May 18, 2018, replacing My Korean Jagiya.

NUTAM (Nationwide Urban Television Audience Measurement) People in Television Homes ratings are provided by AGB Nielsen Philippines.

== Series overview ==
Season	Episodes	Originally released	
Season	Episodes	First released	Last released
1	88	January 15, 2018	May 18, 2018

== Episodes ==
=== January 2018 ===
Episode		Original air date	Social media hashtag	AGB Nielsen NUTAM People in Television Homes			Ref.
Episode		Original air date	Social media hashtag	Rating	Timeslot rank	Whole day rank	Ref.
1	"Pilot"	January 15, 2018	#TheOneThatGotAway	7.7%	#2	#10	
2	"I Want You Back"	January 16, 2018	#TOTGAIWantYouBack	7.1%	#2	#8	
3	"Hopia" (Hopeful)	January 17, 2018	#TOTGAHopia	6.9%	#2	#7	
4	"Awkward"	January 18, 2018	#TOTGAAwkward	7.3%	#2	#7	
5	"Matinding Pasabog" (Intense Explosion)	January 19, 2018	#TOTGAMatindingPasabog	7.7%	#1	#6	
6	"Kagulo" (Riot)	January 22, 2018	#TOTGAKagulo	6.8%	#2	#9	
7	"Major Surprise"	January 23, 2018	#TOTGAMajorSurprise	6.8%	#2	#9	
8	"Woke Up Like This"	January 24, 2018	#TOTGAWokeUpLikeThis	7.2%	#2	#11	
9	"Matinding Pag-amin" (Intense Confession)	January 25, 2018	#TOTGAMatindingPagAmin	6.9%	#2	#10	
10	"Inlababo Pa" (Competitive)	January 26, 2018	#TOTGAInlababoPa	7.4%	#1	#9	
11	"Explosive"	January 29, 2018	#TOTGAExplosive	7.1%	#2	#8	
12	"Fake News"	January 30, 2018	#TOTGAFakeNews	7.0%	#2	#9	
13	"Buking" (Seen)	January 31, 2018	#TOTGABuking	6.9%	#2	#9	
Average				7.1%			

=== February 2018 ===
Episode		Original air date	Social media hashtag	AGB Nielsen NUTAM People			Ref.
Episode		Original air date	Social media hashtag	Rating	Timeslot rank	Whole day rank	Ref.
14	"Epic Fail"	February 1, 2018	#TOTGAEpicFail	6.6%	#2	#10	
15	"Stop the Kasal" (Stop the Wedding)	February 2, 2018	#TOTGAStopTheKasal	7.6%	#1	#8	
16	"I Do, I Don't"	February 5, 2018	#TOTGAIDoIDont	6.4%	#2	#12	
17	"Triple Deyt" (Triple Date)	February 6, 2018	#TOTGATripleDeyt	6.8%	#1	#8	
18	"Huli Ka, Balbon" (I Caught You)	February 7, 2018	#TOTGAHuliKaBalbon	6.1%	#2	#12	
19	"Frenemies"	February 8, 2018	#TOTGAFrenemies	7.1%	#1	#9	
20	"Bikini Run"	February 9, 2018	#TOTGABikiniRun	8.3%	#1	#7	
21	"Loves Me, Loves Me Not"	February 12, 2018	#TOTGALovesMeLovesMeNot	6.9%	#1	#8	
22	"No Good at Goodbyes"	February 13, 2018	#TOTGANoGoodAtGoodbyes	6.5%	#2	#9	
23	"BaeLentine's Day"	February 14, 2018	#TOTGABaeLentinesDay	7.2%	#1	#7	
24	"Pakilig" (Romantic)	February 15, 2018	#TOTGAPakilig	7.3%	#2	#8	
25	"Kiss Marathon"	February 16, 2018	#TOTGAKissMarathon	6.0%	#2	#15	
26	"Love and Kisses"	February 19, 2018	#TOTGALoveAndKisses	6.8%	#2	#10	
27	"Unli Kilig" (Unlimited Romantic)	February 20, 2018	#TOTGAUnliKilig	7.4%	#1	#8	
28	"Past or Future BF"	February 21, 2018	#TOTGAPastOrFutureBF	6.9%	#2	#9	
29	"Torete"	February 22, 2018	#TOTGATorete	6.8%	#2	#13	
30	"Charoting" (Joking)	February 23, 2018	#TOTGACharoting	6.5%	#2	#14	
31	"Love Werpa" (Love Power)	February 26, 2018	#TOTGALoveWerpa	6.2%	#2	#12	
32	"Fakey Fake"	February 27, 2018	#TOTGAFakeyFake	6.3%	#1	#11	
33	"Liam na This" (It's Liam)	February 28, 2018	#TOTGALiamNaThis	6.9%	#2	#13	
Average				6.8%			

=== March 2018 ===
Episode		Original air date	Social media hashtag	AGB Nielsen NUTAM People in Television Homes			Ref.
Episode		Original air date	Social media hashtag	Rating	Timeslot rank	Whole day rank	Ref.
34	"All About That Baes"	March 1, 2018	#TOTGAAllAboutThatBaes	7.0%	#2	#11	
35	"Past vs. Present"	March 2, 2018	#TOTGAPastVsPresent	6.0%	#2	#10	
36	"It's Raining Men"	March 5, 2018	#TOTGAItsRainingMen	6.7%	#2	#10	
37	"Feeling Hot"	March 6, 2018	#TOTGAFeelingHot	7.1%	#2	#7	
38	"Bukayo" (Coconut Candy)	March 7, 2018	#TOTGABukayo	7.0%	#2	#8	
39	"In Love With You"	March 8, 2018	#TOTGAInLoveWithYou	7.2%	#2	#10	
40	"Taguan ng Feels" (Hidden Feels)	March 9, 2018	#TOTGATaguanNgFeels	6.9%	#2	#11	
41	"Gulong Petmalu" (Amazing War)	March 12, 2018	#TOTGAGulongPetmalu	6.9%	#2	#11	
42	"Finding Nemo"	March 13, 2018	#TOTGAFindingNemo	7.4%	#1	#7	
43	"Agaw Eksena" (Scene Stealer)	March 14, 2018	#TOTGAAgawEksena	7.9%	#2	#8	
44	"Love Ka o Love Mo?" (You Love or You're Loved?)	March 15, 2018	#TOTGALoveKaOLoveMo	7.5%	#2	#10	
45	"Kiss Bulaga" (Kiss Surprised)	March 16, 2018	#TOTGAKissBulaga	7.7%	#2	#11	
46	"Da Best Ka!" (You're the Best!)	March 19, 2018	#TOTGADaBestKa	—N/a			
47	"Heart Attack"	March 20, 2018	#TOTGAHeartAttack	—N/a			
48	"Hot Bods Alert"	March 21, 2018	#TOTGAHotBodsAlert	—N/a			
49	"Sexy and They Know It"	March 22, 2018	#TOTGASexyAndTheyKnowIt	—N/a			
50	"Kalurkeng Ganap" (Crazy Fully)	March 23, 2018	#TOTGAKalurkengGanap	7.2%	#2	#7	
51	"Georgeous Kaaway" (Georgeous Enemy)	March 26, 2018	#TOTGAGeorgeousKaaway	8.3%	#2	#8	
52	"Aminan" (Confessing)	March 27, 2018	#TOTGAAminan	8.2%	#2	#8	
53	"Budol Budol"	March 28, 2018	#TOTGABudolBudol		#2		
Average							

=== April 2018 ===
Episode		Original air date	Social media hashtag	AGB Nielsen NUTAM People in Television Homes			Ref.
Episode		Original air date	Social media hashtag	Rating	Timeslot rank	Whole day rank	Ref.
54	"KASALanan" (Wedding Sins)	April 2, 2018	#TOTGAKASALanan		#2		
55	"Viral na Tey" (It's Viral, Sis)	April 3, 2018	#TOTGAViralNaTey		#2		
56	"Triple Confessions"	April 4, 2018	#TOTGATripleConfessions		#2		
57	"Wasak" (Ruin)	April 5, 2018	#TOTGAWasak		#2		
58	"Fact or Bluff"	April 6, 2018	#TOTGAFactOrBluff		#2		
59	"Halik Halik Kim" (Kiss Kiss Kim)	April 9, 2018	#TOTGAHalikHalikKim		#2		
60	"3 Way Aminan" (3 Way Confessing)	April 10, 2018	#TOTGA3WayAminan		#2		
61	"Jowaan Goals" (Lovelife Goals)	April 11, 2018	#TOTGAJowaanGoals		#2		
62	"Hayaan Mo Sila" (Let Them Go)	April 12, 2018	#TOTGAHayaanMoSila		#2		
63	"Will You Marry Me?"	April 13, 2018	#TOTGAWillYouMarryMe		#2		
64	"I'd Still Say Yes"	April 16, 2018	#TOTGAIdStillSayYes		#1		
65	"Habulin Mo 'Ko" (Chase Me)	April 17, 2018	#TOTGAHabulinMoKo	8.6%	#2		
66	"Naked Truth"	April 18, 2018	#TOTGANakedTruth		#1		
67	"Tagu-taguan" (Hide and Seek)	April 19, 2018	#TOTGATaguTaguan		#1		
68	"Heart Break"	April 20, 2018	#TOTGAHeartBreak		#1		
69	"Cryola" (Crying Crayons)	April 23, 2018	#TOTGACryola		#2		
70	"Oops Touchy"	April 24, 2018	#TOTGAOopsTouchy		#2		
71	"It's Komplikado" (It's Complicated)	April 25, 2018	#TOTGAItsKomplikado		#1		
72	"Trending Problema" (Trending Problems)	April 26, 2018	#TOTGATrendingProblema		#2		
73	"Intense"	April 27, 2018	#TOTGAIntense		#2		
74	"Rampage"	April 30, 2018	#TOTGARampage		#1		
Average							

=== May 2018 ===
Episode		Original air date	Social media hashtag	AGB Nielsen NUTAM People in Television Homes			Ref.
Episode		Original air date	Social media hashtag	Rating	Timeslot rank	Whole day rank	Ref.
75	"Infinity War"	May 1, 2018	#TOTGAInfinityWar		#1		
76	"Avenge Me"	May 2, 2018	#TOTGAAvengeMe		#2		
77	"Friendship Over"	May 3, 2018	#TOTGAFriendshipOver		#2		
78	"Boom Crash"	May 4, 2018	#TOTGABoomCrash		#1		
79	"Cast Away"	May 7, 2018	#TOTGACastAway	9.8%	#1		
80	"Hunger Games"	May 8, 2018	#TOTGAHungerGames	10.0%	#1		
81	"LiBag"	May 9, 2018	#TOTGALiBag	10.2%	#1		
82	"My Tendency"	May 10, 2018	#TOTGAMay10dency	9.9%	#1		
83	"Cray Cray"	May 11, 2018	#TOTGACrayCray	9.5%	#1		
84	"Hirap Ispell" (Hard to Spell)	May 14, 2018	#TOTGAHirapIspell		#2		
85	"LexLi, DarNigo, ZoEl"	May 15, 2018	#TOTGALexLiDarNigoZoEl		#2		
86	"TOTGAgas Get Get Aww!"	May 16, 2018	#TOTGAgasGetGetAww		#2		
87	"Mud Wrestling"	May 17, 2018	#TOTGAMudWrestling		#1		
88	"Exciting Finale"	May 18, 2018	#TOTGAExcitingFinale	10.9%	#1		
Average							
