= List of My Korean Jagiya episodes =

My Korean Jagiya (Korean: 한국인 자기야; RR: Hangugin Jagiya) is a 2017 Philippine television drama comedy romance series directed by Mark A. Reyes, starring Heart Evangelista and Alexander Lee. The series premiered on GMA Network's GMA Telebabad primetime block and aired worldwide on GMA Pinoy TV on August 21, 2017, replacing I Heart Davao.

NUTAM (Nationwide Urban Television Audience Measurement) People in television homes ratings are provided by AGB Nielsen Philippines.

== Series overview ==
Month	Episodes	Monthly averages
Month	Episodes	NUTAM
August 2017	9	6.5%
September 2017	21	6.4%
October 2017	22	7.3%
November 2017	22	7.5%
December 2017	21	6.7%
January 2018	10	6.8%
Total	105	6.9%

== Episodes ==
In the tables below, the blue numbers represent the lowest ratings and the red numbers represent the highest ratings.

=== August 2017 ===
Episode		Original air date	Social media hashtag	AGB Nielsen NUTAM People			Ref.
Episode		Original air date	Social media hashtag	Rating	Timeslot rank	Whole day rank	Ref.
1	"Pilot"	August 21, 2017	#MyKoreanJagiya	6.6%	#1	#7	
2	"Pinagtagpo" (Coming Together)	August 22, 2017	#MKJPinagtagpo	6.3%	#2	#8	
3	"Jun Ho Meets Pao"	August 23, 2017	#MKJJunHoMeetsPao	5.8%	#2	#8	
4	"The Proposal"	August 24, 2017	#MKJTheProposal	5.7%	#2	#7	
5	"Gia Saves Jun Ho"	August 25, 2017	#MKJGiaSavesJunHo	6.9%	#1	#7	
6	"Fan Girl Goals"	August 28, 2017	#MKJFanGirlGoals	6.3%	#2	#8	
7	"Problem Child"	August 29, 2017	#MKJProblemChild	6.7%	#2	#8	
8	"We Meet Again"	August 30, 2017	#MKJWeMeetAgain	6.5%	#1	#7	
9	"First Fight"	August 31, 2017	#MKJFirstFight	7.4%	#1	#6	

=== September 2017 ===
Episode		Original air date	Social media hashtag	AGB Nielsen NUTAM People			Ref.
Episode		Original air date	Social media hashtag	Rating	Timeslot rank	Whole day rank	Ref.
10	"Gia To The Rescue"	September 1, 2017	#MKJGiaToTheRescue	7.0%	#2	#8	
11	"Dear Jun Ho"	September 4, 2017	#MKJDearJunHo	5.3%	#2	#8	
12	"Gia You Are Fired"	September 5, 2017	#MKJGiaYouAreFired	6.0%	#2	#8	
13	"Second Chance"	September 6, 2017	#MKJSecondChance	5.8%	#2	#8	
14	"Gia is Back"	September 7, 2017	#MKJGiaIsBack	6.5%	#2	#8	
15	"Adoption"	September 8, 2017	#MKJAdoption	6.6%	#2	#8	
16	"Gia Will You Marry Me"	September 11, 2017	#MKJGiaWillYouMarryMe	6.7%	#2	#11	
17	"Gias Final Answer"	September 12, 2017	#MKJGiasFinalAnswer	6.1%	#2	#14	
18	"Gia JunHo Back in Korea"	September 13, 2017	#MKJGiaJunHoBackInKorea	6.3%	#2	13	
19	"Seoul Search"	September 14, 2017	#MKJSeoulSearch	7.2%	#2	#12	
20	"Wedding Blues"	September 15, 2017	#MKJWeddingBlues	7.2%	#2	#8	
21	"Tuloy Ang Kasal" (Wedding)	September 18, 2017	#MKJTuloyAngKasal	6.2%	#2	#12	
22	"Mr and Mrs Kim Jun Ho"	September 19, 2017	#MKJMrAndMrsKimJunHo	—N/a			
23	"About Last Night"	September 20, 2017	#MKJAboutLastNight	—N/a			
24	"Feeling Wife"	September 21, 2017	#MKJFeelingWife	6.0%	#2	#14	
25	"Monster in Law"	September 22, 2017	#MKJMonsterInLaw	6.3%	#2	#13	
26	"Fam Bam Blues"	September 25, 2017	#MKJFamBamBlues	6.1%	#2	#12	
27	"In Love Ka Na Ba" (You're in love)	September 26, 2017	#MKJInLoveKaNaBa	6.8%	#1	#8	
28	"First Real Kiss"	September 27, 2017	#MKJFirstRealKiss	7.3%	#1	#7	
29	"Fall or Fail"	September 28, 2017	#MKJFallOrFail	6.6%	#2	#11	
30	"Paasa" (Hopeful)	September 29, 2017	#MKJPaasa	6.4%	#1	#11	

=== October 2017 ===
Episode		Original air date	Social media hashtag	AGB Nielsen NUTAM People			Ref.
Episode		Original air date	Social media hashtag	Rating	Timeslot rank	Whole day rank	Ref.
31	"Enough is Enough"	October 2, 2017	#MKJEnoughIsEnough	7.5%	#1	#7	
32	"The Wrong Mr Right"	October 3, 2017	#MKJTheWrongMrRight	6.9%	#1	#9	
33	"Its Complicated"	October 4, 2017	#MKJItsComplicated	6.7%	#1	#7	
34	"Jealous Jun Ho"	October 5, 2017	#MKJJealousJunHo	6.5%	#1	#11	
35	"Fake News"	October 6, 2017	#MKJFakeNews	6.1%	#2	#9	
36	"Swimsuit Showdown"	October 9, 2017	#MKJSwimsuitShowdown	8.0%	#1	#8	
37	"Hopya Paasa Wasak" (Rely in love)	October 10, 2017	#MKJHopyaPaasaWasak	7.6%	#1	#8	
38	"Gusto pa rin kita" (i still like you)	October 11, 2017	#MKJGustoPaRinKita	7.3%	#1	#8	
39	"Taguan ng feelings" (Secret Feelings)	October 12, 2017	#MKJTaguanNgFeelings	7.4%	#1	#8	
40	"Fighting"	October 13, 2017	#MKJFighting	8.0%	#1	#9	
41	"Sorry Na" (Sorry)	October 16, 2017	#MKJSorryNa	7.2%	#1	#10	
42	"Hinahanap hanap kita" (I'm looking for you)	October 17, 2017	#MKJHinahanaphanapKita	7.6%	#1	#9	
43	"Challenge Accepted"	October 18, 2017	#MKJChallengeAccepted	7.1%	#1	#9	
44	"Epal Alert" (Bumping Alert)	October 19, 2017	#MKJEpalAlert	7.0%	#1	#10	
45	"Sopas Ala Gia" (Soup Ala Gia)	October 20, 2017	#MKJSopasAlaGia	7.6%	#1	#9	
46	"Team Jun Ho vs. Team Ryan"	October 23, 2017	#MKJTeamJunHoVsTeamRyan	7.8%	#1	#8	
47	"Ang Halik Mo" (Your Kiss)	October 24, 2017	#MKJAngHalikMo	8.2%	#1	#8	
48	"Lugaw o Ligaw" (Gruel or Wooing)	October 25, 2017	#MKJLugawOLigaw	6.6%	#1	#10	
49	"Pwede Ba Kitang Ligawan?" (May I Woo You?)	October 26, 2017	#MKJPwedeBaKitangLigawan	8.2%	#1	#8	
50	"Fever"	October 27, 2017	#MKJFever	6.7%	#1	#9	
51	"Aalagaan Kita" (I'll Take Care of You)	October 30, 2017	#MKJAalagaanKita	7.3%	#2	#11	
52	"Royal Rambol" (Royal Rumble)	October 31, 2017	#MKJRoyalRambol	8.2%	#1	#8	

=== November 2017 ===
Episode		Original air date	Social media hashtag	AGB Nielsen NUTAM People			Ref.
Episode		Original air date	Social media hashtag	Rating	Timeslot rank	Whole day rank	Ref.
53	"Sino Pipiliin Ko?" (Who I Choose?)	November 1, 2017	#MKJSinoPipiliinKo	6.9%	#1	#10	
54	"My Crazy Girl"	November 2, 2017	#MKJMyCrazyGirl	8.6%	#1	#8	
55	"Gusto Kita" (I Like You)	November 3, 2017	#MKJGustoKita	8.7%	#1	#7	
56	"Team Ampalaya" (Team Bitter)	November 6, 2017	#MKJTeamAmpalaya	7.8%	#1	#8	
57	"Worried si Gia" (Worried Gia)	November 7, 2017	#MKJWorriedSiGia	7.6%	#2	#10	
58	"Pogi Problems" (Handsome Problems)	November 8, 2017	#MKJPogiProblems	7.2%	#2	#10	
59	"Family Bonding"	November 9, 2017	#MKJFamilyBonding	7.4%	#1	#10	
60	"Matamis na Oo" (Sweet Yes)	November 10, 2017	#MKJMatamisNaOo	7.8%	#1		
61	"Laban, Gia" (Fight, Gia)	November 13, 2017	#MKJLabanGia	7.7%	#1	#8	
62	"Cindy Kato" (Cindy' Syndicate)	November 14, 2017	#MKJCindyKato	6.9%	#1	#9	
63	"Strong Girl Gia"	November 15, 2017	#MKJStrongGirlGia	7.0%	#2	#10	
64	"Attack Mode"	November 16, 2017	#MKJAttackMode	6.8%	#2	#10	
65	"Secret ni Cindy" (Cindy's Secret)	November 17, 2017	#MKJSecretNiCindy	7.8%	#1	#7	
66	"Miss na Kita" (I Miss You)	November 20, 2017	#MKJMissNaKita	7.5%	#1	#7	
67	"Huli Ka, Cindy" (I Caught You, Cindy)	November 21, 2017	#MKJHuliKaCindy	7.3%	#1	#8	
68	"Drug Test"	November 22, 2017	#MKJDrugTest	6.6%	#2	#10	
69	"Arestado" (Arrested)	November 23, 2017	#MKJArestado	7.2%	#1	#6	
70	"Welcome Gong-woo"	November 24, 2017	#MKJWelcomeGongWoo	8.2%	#1	#7	
71	"Frenemies"	November 27, 2017	#MKJFrenemies	8.0%	#1		
72	"Bahay-Bahayan" (Playhouse)	November 28, 2017	#MKJBahayBahayan	7.9%	#1		
73	"Bed Scene"	November 29, 2017	#MKJBedScene	7.9%	#1		
74	"Operation Kilig" (Operation Romantic Excitement)	November 30, 2017	#MKJOperationKilig	7.5%	#1		

=== December 2017 ===
Episode		Original air date	Social media hashtag	AGB Nielsen NUTAM People			Ref.
Episode		Original air date	Social media hashtag	Rating	Timeslot rank	Whole day rank	Ref.
75	"Couple Goals"	December 1, 2017	#MKJCoupleGoals	8.0%	#1		
76	"Asar Talo" (Annoying Loser)	December 4, 2017	#MKJAsarTalo	7.0%	#2	#11	
77	"Shookt"	December 5, 2017	#MKJShookt	7.5%	#2	#10	
78	"Jun-ho, Please Explain"	December 6, 2017	#MKJJunHoPleaseExplain	7.3%	#2	#9	
79	"Mahal Pa Rin Kita" (I Still Love You)	December 7, 2017	#MKJMahalPaRinKita	7.3%	#2	#8	
80	"Simbang Gabi Wish" (Evening Mass Wish)	December 8, 2017	#MKJSimbangGabiWish	7.5%	#2	#8	
81	"Monito Monita"	December 11, 2017	#MKJMonitoMonita	6.5%	#2	#10	
82	"Malaya Ka Na" (You're Free)	December 12, 2017	#MKJMalayaKaNa	7.2%	#1	#9	
83	"Want You Back"	December 13, 2017	#MKJWantYouBack	7.0%	#2	#8	
84	"One Call Away"	December 14, 2017	#MKJOneCallAway	6.6%	#2	#12	
85	"Kerwin's Mission"	December 15, 2017	#MKJKerwinsMission	6.3%	#2	#12	
86	"Werpa Gia" (Power Gia)	December 18, 2017	#MKJWerpaGia	6.9%	#1	#8	
87	"Sepanx"	December 19, 2017	#MKJSepanx	7.9%	#1	#9	
88	"Pasabog" (Petard)	December 20, 2017	#MKJPasabog	7.6%	#1	#7	
89	"Miss Kita, Miss Mo 'Ko?" (I Miss You, Do You Miss Me?)	December 21, 2017	#MKJMissKitaMissMoKo	7.0%	#2	#11	
90	"Beast Mode"	December 22, 2017	#MKJBeastMode	7.3%	#1	#11	
91	"It's a Trap"	December 25, 2017	#MKJItsATrap	5.1%	#2	#10	
92	"Saranghae, Gia" (I Love You, Gia)	December 26, 2017	#MKJSaranghaeGia	6.8%	#2	#10	
93	"Missing My Crazy Girl"	December 27, 2017	#MKJMissingMyCrazyGirl	7.2%	#2	#10	
94	"Gia, Where na U?" (Gia, Where Are You?)	December 28, 2017	#MKJGiaWhereNaU	7.3%	#2	#10	
95	"Fight for Gia"	December 29, 2017	#MKJFightForGia	7.1%	#2	#8	

=== January 2018 ===
Episode		Original air date	Social media hashtag	AGB Nielsen NUTAM People			Ref.
Episode		Original air date	Social media hashtag	Rating	Timeslot rank	Whole day rank	Ref.
96	"Jun-ho vs. Gong-woo"	January 1, 2018	#MKJJunHoVsGongWoo	6.3%	#1	#9	
97	"Tagay Tayo" (Let's Drink)	January 2, 2018	#MKJTagayTayo	6.3%	#2	#13	
98	"Karma ni Cindy" (Cindy's Karma)	January 3, 2018	#MKJKarmaNiCindy	6.8%	#2	#12	
99	"Reunited"	January 4, 2018	#MKJReunited	7.6%	#1	#7	
100	"Follow Your Dream"	January 5, 2018	#MKJFollowYourDream	7.3%	#1	#8	
101	"One Kilig Day" (One Romantic Excitement Day)	January 8, 2018	#MKJOneKiligDay	6.8%	#2	#9	
102	"Welcome Back, Gia"	January 9, 2018	#MKJWelcomeBackGia	6.1%	#2	#12	
103	"Drunk in Love"	January 10, 2018	#MKJDrunkInLove	6.5%	#2	#10	
104	"JuGia Forever"	January 11, 2018	#MKJJuGiaForever	6.7%	#2	#11	
105	"Kilig Finale" (The Romantic Finale)	January 12, 2018	#MKJKiligFinale	8.5%	#1	#6	
