= The Masseur =

The Masseur Masahista
- Official movie poster
- Directed by: Brillante Mendoza
- Screenplay by: Boots Agbayani S. Pastor
- Story by: Brillante Mendoza; Boots Agbayani S. Pastor
- Based on: An original story by Ferdinand Lapus
- Produced by: Marissa Cua; Fedelyn Geling; Ma. Lourdes Gnileg; Dante Mungcal; Venus Mungcal
- Starring: Coco Martin; Jacklyn Jose; Allan Paule; Katherine Luna; Cyan James Realgo
- Cinematography: Timmy Jimenez; Monchie Redoble
- Edited by: Herbert Navasca
- Music by: Jerrold Tarog
- Production companies: Gee Films Productions International; Centerstage Productions
- Distributed by: GMA Films
- Release date: October 19, 2005
- Running time: 76 minutes
- Country: Philippines
- Languages: Filipino; Kapampangan

The Masseur (Filipino: Masahista) is a 2005 Filipino psychological drama film directed by Brillante Mendoza (in his directorial debut) from a story he co-wrote with Boots Agbayani Pastor, who solely wrote the screenplay.

== Plot ==
Iliac is a young masseur who works in Manila. One day, he travels back to his home in Pampanga and finds out that his bedridden father has passed away. Iliac assists in the preparation of his father's burial, and discovers a new relationship with one of his massage clients.

== Cast ==
- Coco Martin as Iliac
- Jaclyn Jose as Naty
- Alan Paule as Alfredo/Marina Hidalgo
- Katherine Luna as Tessa
- R.U. Miranda as Lorena
- Aaron Christian Rivera as Maldon
- Arianne Camille Rivera as Faye
- Ronaldo Bertubin as Manager
- Norman Pineda as Edmond
- John Baltazar as Anthony
- Jan-el Esturco as Errand Boy
- Erlinda Cruz as Jean
- Rose Mendoza as Rose
- Mary Anne dela Cruz as Jean
- Maximiano Sultan as Rodel
- Josefina Punzalan as Funeral Parlor Directress
- Jayson Colis as Axel
- Randel Reyes as John
- Paolo Rivero as Andrew
- Kristopher King as Lester
- Marvin Bautista as Dennis
- Adan Bolivar as Gabriel
- Kim Relucio as Louie
- Jaypee Basco as Edwin
- Joe Armas as Jay
- Jetro Rafael as Ferdinand
- Joel Ilagan as Masseur
- Domineek Almoete as Client A
- Odsz Molina as Client B
- Ferdie Lapuz as Client C
- Monti Parungao as Client D
- Ino Amoyo as Client E
- Lou Veloso as Client F
- Paolo Cruz as Client G
- Orly Myco as Mason
- Janice Fernandez as Nurse
- Ador Dincol as Photographer
- Neth Mendoza as Mourner
- Jean Tubal as Mourner
- Auring Manguerra as Mourner
- Nenita Manguerra as Mourner
- Juliet Santillan as Mourner
- Brando Mendoza as Mourner

== Reception ==
The film has received a mixed reception, with Lucas Pistilli of Dirty Movies and Jay Weissberg of Variety giving a negative review, criticizing the film for its story, visuals, and the characters' lack of depth.

Panos Kotzathanasis of Asian Movie Pulse gave a positive review, praising its "intriguing narrative" and Coco Martin's "great performance."

The film's juxtaposition editing technique was also given praise, with both the funeral procession and massage scenes mixed together.

=== Meme status ===
In August 2025, the film received a resurgence in popularity after multiple Facebook and TikTok meme pages and users began to share a series of memes highlighting an image macro of Iliac (played by Coco Martin) saying "Sir, tapos na po." (transl. Sir, it is done.) to his client Alfredo (played by Allan Paule) after a massage session.

== Awards ==
| Year | Film Festival/Award | Award | Category/Recipient |
|---|---|---|---|
| 2006 | Young Critics Circle, Philippines | Best Movie | |
| 2006 | Young Critics Circle, Philippines | Best Actor | Coco Martin |
| 2006 | Brisbane Filmfest, Australia | Interfaith Award | |
| 2005 | 58th Locarno International Film Festival, Switzerland | Golden Leopard award | Video competition |
