= Young Critics Circle =

Society of film critics in the Philippines

Young Critics Circle Film Desk
- Abbreviation: YCC
- Formation: 1990
- Type: Film organization
- Headquarters: Philippines
- Chair: Andrea Anne Trinidad
- Website: yccfilmdesk.wordpress.com

The Young Critics Circle - Film Desk is a society of film critics and an award-giving body for cinema in the Philippines. It was established in 1990 and had its first awarding in 1991.

== Establishment ==
In 1990, a group of young reviewers and critics decided to form a body that aimed to evaluate works of art in various disciplines (film, theater, music, literature, visual arts and broadcast arts). Founding members include Mike Feria, Joy Barrios, Jojo Buenconsejo, Eric Caruncho, Melissa Contreras, Jaime Daroy, Joel David, Gin de Mesa, Patrick Flores, Francine Medina, Charlson Ong, Mozart Pastrano, Danilo Reyes, and Antonio Tinio. Each member specialized on one or more disciplines or “desks”. At present, only the Film Desk is existing.

The Film Desk of the Young Critics Circle (YCC) first gave its annual citations in film achievement in 1991, a year after the YCC was organized. In their Declaration of Principles, the members expressed the belief that cultural texts always call for active readings, “interactions” in fact among different readers who have the “unique capacities to discern, to interpret, and to reflect… evolving a dynamic discourse in which the text provokes the most imaginative ideas of our time.”

The Film Desk has committed itself to the discussion of film in the various arenas of academe and media, with the hope of fostering an alternative and emergent articulation of film critical practice, even within the severely debilitating culture of "awards".

== Members ==
The members of the YCC who review Filipino films and choose the winners of the annual YCC Citations are members of the academe coming from various disciplines, such art studies, literary studies, creative writing, anthropology, communication, philosophy, visual arts, Philippine studies, film studies, and history. Active members are:

- Aristotle Atienza
- John Bengan
- Christian Jil Benitez
- Ian Harvey Claros
- Emerald Flaviano
- Patrick Flores
- Tessa Maria Guazon
- Skilty C. Labastilla
- Nonoy L. Lauzon
- Janus Nolasco
- Judith Camille Rosette
- Tito Quiling Jr.
- Jaime Oscar M. Salazar
- Cristian Tablazon
- Andrea Anne Trinidad, president of YCC (2022-2023)

== Awards ==
YCC draws its selection from both regular and non-regular releases comprising the entirety of annual Philippine cinema output. Films considered for discussion are those that had at least two screenings before a paying or non-paying audience in any public venue. The group first comes up with a long list, where each film on the list is discussed as to its merits and demerits. The list is further narrowed down to a shortlist of any number. Only short-listed films earn the privilege to be nominated for any of the six main categories that are handed out each year. Except for the Best First Feature category, YCC does not confer nominations on artistic or technical merit if the film does not qualify in the short list.

The six awards handed out since 1990 are:

- Best Film
- Best Performance
- Best Screenplay
- Best Achievement in Editing
- Best Achievement in Cinematography and Visual Design
- Best Achievement in Sound and Aural Orchestration.

In 2013, the group added a new category, Best First Feature, to be given to filmmakers who directed the three best debut feature films of the year.

== Winners ==
=== Best Film ===
The Young Critics Circle Award for Best Film is awarded to honor the best Filipino film of the year. Per YCC criteria, the award for Best Film "refers to vision and direction that pay sensitive and keen attention to both the language of cinema ('presentation') and social reality ('representation'), in the process refunctioning the possibilities of film as progressive art and popular culture. The Best Film citation is awarded to the Director not so much because he or she is the auteur or the central intelligence of the film, but because his or her work lies at the conjuncture which coordinates filmmaking."

Directors with multiple Best Film wins include:

- Jose Javier Reyes (Hindi Kita Malilimutan, 1993; Batang PX, 1997; and Minsan May Isang Puso, 2001)
- Adolfo Alix Jr. (Adela, 2008; Haruo, 2011; and Porno, 2013)
- Chito Roño (Bata, Bata, Paano Ka Ginawa?, 1998; and Dekada '70, 2002)
- Mario O'Hara (Sisa, 1999; and Babae sa Breakwater, 2003)
- Brillante Mendoza (Masahista, 2005; and Foster Child, 2007)
- Ralston Jover (Bakal Boys, 2009; and Da Dog Show, 2015)

Year	Winner/s	Director/s
1990	Andrea, Paano Ba ang Maging Isang Ina?	Gil Portes
1991	Sa Kabila ng Lahat	Lino Brocka
1992	Ikaw Pa Lang ang Minahal	Carlos Siguion-Reyna
1993	Hindi Kita Malilimutan	Jose Javier Reyes
1994	Vampira; Pangako ng Kahapon	Joey Romero; Joel Lamangan
1995	Nena	Ike Jarlego Jr.
1996	Mumbaki	Jose Antonio Perez
1997	Batang PX	Jose Javier Reyes
1998	Bata, Bata, Paano Ka Ginawa?	Chito Roño
1999	Sisa	Mario O'Hara
2000	Bayaning Third World; Tanging Yaman	Mike De Leon; Laurice Guillen
2001	Minsan May Isang Puso	Jose Javier Reyes
2002	Dekada '70	Chito Roño
2003	Babae sa Breakwater	Mario O'Hara
2004	Minsan Pa	Jeffrey Jeturian
2005	Masahista	Brillante Mendoza
2006	Inang Yaya	Pablo Biglang-awa and Veronica Velasco
2007	Foster Child	Brillante Mendoza
2008	Adela	Adolfo Alix Jr.
2009	Bakal Boys	Ralston Jover
2010	Himpapawid	Raymond Red
2011	Haruo	Adolfo Alix Jr.
2012	Qiyamah	Gutierrez Mangansakan II
2013	Porno	Adolfo Alix Jr.
2014	No winner	
2015	Da Dog Show	Ralston Jover
2016	Women of the Weeping River	Sheron Dayoc
2017	Baconaua	Joseph Israel Laban
2018	Sa Palad ng Dantaong Kulang	Jewel Maranan
2019	Edward	Thop Nazareno
2020	Death of Nintendo; Kintsugi	Raya Martin; Lawrence Fajardo

=== Best Performance ===
The YCC award for Best Performance refers to acting, to the playing out of a role or character that implicates emotion, feeling, and experience in the social conditions of the personal and in the political economies of habit and gesture and how these forge the body politic. The Best Performance citation is handed to the Performer, whether male or female, adult or child, in major or supporting role, individual or ensemble.

Since there is only one award given for performance (whether male or female, lead or supporting, individual or ensemble), the YCC Best Performance Award is highly coveted in the Philippine film industry. Since the first awarding in 1991, Nora Aunor has the most nominations with thirteen, and the most wins with five.

Aunor has been nominated for:

- Andrea, Paano Ba ang Maging Isang Ina? (1990)
- Ang Totoong Buhay ni Pacita M. (1991)
- Inay (1993)
- The Flor Contemplacion Story (1995)
- Muling Umawit ang Puso (1995)
- Bakit May Kahapon Pa? (1996)
- Babae (1997)
- Naglalayag (2004)
- Thy Womb (2012)
- Ang Kwento Ni Mabuti (2013)
- Taklub (2015)
- Tuos (2016) (double nomination: single performance / Duo)

She won for Andrea, Paano Ba ang Maging Isang Ina?, Ang Totoong Buhay ni Pacita M., Inay, The Flor Contemplacion Story, and Thy Womb.

Other multiple winners include:

- Maricel Soriano (Ikaw Pa Lang ang Minahal, 1992; Vampira, 1994; and Inang Yaya, 2006)
- Aga Muhlach (Joey Boy Munti, 1991; and Hindi Kita Malilimutan)
- Vilma Santos (Bata, Bata, Paano Ka Ginawa?, 1998; and Dekada '70, 2002)

Year	Winner/s	Film
1990	Nora Aunor	Andrea, Paano Ba ang Maging Isang Ina?
1991	Nora Aunor; Aga Muhlach	Ang Totoong Buhay ni Pacita M. Joey Boy Munti
1992	Maricel Soriano	Ikaw Pa Lang ang Minahal
1993	Nora Aunor; Aga Muhlach	Inay; Hindi Kita Malilimutan
1994	Maricel Soriano	Vampira
1995	Nora Aunor	The Flor Contemplacion Story
1996	Christopher de Leon	Madrasta
1997	Patrick Garcia	Batang PX
1998	Vilma Santos	Bata, Bata, Paano Ka Ginawa?
1999	Elizabeth Oropesa	Bulaklak ng Maynila
2000	Gloria Romero; Hilda Koronel; Dina Bonnevie; Edu Manzano; Johnny Delgado; Joel Torre; Cherry Pie Picache; Marvin Agustin; Jericho Rosales; CJ Ramos; Shaina Magdayao; John Prats; Dominic Ochoa; Janet McBride; Carol Banawa	Tanging Yaman
2001	Jaclyn Jose	Minsan May Isang Puso
2002	Vilma Santos; Piolo Pascual	Dekada '70
2003	Katherine Luna	Babae sa Breakwater
2004	Dennis Trillo; Jomari Yllana	Aishite Imasu 1941: Mahal Kita; Minsan Pa
2005	Coco Martin	Masahista
2006	Maricel Soriano	Inang Yaya
2007	Jason Abalos	Endo
2008	Anita Linda	Adela
2009	Janice de Belen	Last Viewing
2010	Carla Abellana; Raul Arellano	Shake, Rattle and Roll 12: Punerarya; Himpapawid
2011	Diana Zubiri	Bahay Bata
2012	Nora Aunor	Thy Womb
2013	Carlo Aquino; Jhong Hilario	Porno; Badil
2014	Eula Valdez and Nonie Buencamino (duo performance)	Dagitab
2015	Lou Veloso	Da Dog Show
2016	Laila Ulao	Women of the Weeping River
2017	Anthony Falcon	Mga Gabing Kasinghaba ng Hair Ko
2018	Nadine Lustre	Never Not Love You
2019	Isabel Sandoval	Lingua Franca
2020	JC Santos; Kim Chloe Oquendo, Noel Comia Jr., Jigger Sementilla, and John Vincent Servilla (ensemble)	Kintsugi; Death of Nintendo

=== Best Screenplay ===
Best Screenplay refers to the rhetoric of writing for film that articulates the complexity of social life and personal perturbation through narrative logic or political conviction; or simply through well-thought out dramatic tension that explores contestation between the personal and the political, the individual and the collective, the private and the public. The Best Screenplay award is given to the writer of the film.

Multiple Best Screenplay winners include:

- Jose Javier Reyes (Dinampot Ka Lang sa Putik, 1991; Iisa Pa Lamang, 1992; Hindi Kita Malilimutan, 1993; Batang PX, 1997; and Minsan May Isang Puso 2001)
- Ralston Jover (Foster Child, 2007; Porno, 2013; Da Dog Show, 2015; and Mrs., 2016)
- Lualhati Bautista (Nena, 1995; Bata, Bata, Paano Ka Ginawa?, 1998; and Dekada '70, 2002)
- Mario O'Hara (Sisa, 1999; and Babae sa Breakwater, 2003)
- Armando Lao (Minsan Pa, 2004; and Biyaheng Lupa, 2009)
- John Bedia (The Chanters, 2017; and Edward, 2019)

Year	Winner/s	Film
1990	Ricardo Lee	Andrea, Paano Ba ang Maging Isang Ina? Hahamakin Lahat
1991	Roy Iglesias; Jose Javier Reyes and Jake Tordesillas	Sa Kabila ng Lahat; Dinampot Ka Lang sa Putik
1992	Raquel Villavicencio; Jose Javier Reyes	Ikaw Pa Lang ang Minahal; Iisa Pa Lamang
1993	Jose Javier Reyes	Hindi Kita Malilimutan
1994	Jose Dalisay Jr. Emmanuel Borlaza	Bakit Ngayon Ka Lang?
1995	Lualhati Bautista	Nena
1996	Amado Lacuesta; Antonio Jose Perez	Mumbaki
1997	Jose Javier Reyes	Batang PX
1998	Lualhati Bautista	Bata, Bata, Paano Ka Ginawa?
1999	Mario O’Hara	Sisa
2000	Shaira Mella Salvador; Raymond Lee; Laurice Guillen	Tanging Yaman
2001	Jose Javier Reyes	Minsan May Isang Puso
2002	Lualhati Bautista	Dekada '70
2003	Mario O’Hara	Babae sa Breakwater
2004	Armando Lao	Minsan Pa
2005	Ferdinand Lapuz; Brillante Mendoza; Boots Agbayani Pastor	Masahista
2006	Veronica Velasco	Inang Yaya
2007	Ralston Jover	Foster Child
2008	Adolfo Alix Jr. Nick Olanka	Adela
2009	Armando Lao	Biyaheng Lupa
2010	Raymond Red	Himpapawid
2011	Rodolfo Vera	Niño
2012	Arnel Mardoquio	Ang Paglalakbay ng mga Bituin sa Gabing Madilim
2013	Ralston Jover	Porno
2014	No winner	
2015	Ralston Jover	Da Dog Show
2016	Ralston Jover	Mrs.
2017	John Bedia; Andrian Legaspi	The Chanters
2018	Gutierrez Mangansakan II	Masla A Papanok
2019	John Bedia; Thop Nazareno; Denise O'Hara	Edward
2020	Jason Paul Laxamana	He Who Is Without Sin

=== Best Achievement in Editing ===
Best Achievement in Editing refers to the configuration of relationships of time and space among scenes in a film that is able to synthesize, engage in collision, reconcile, or transgress connections through the complex interplay of mise-en-scene and montage. The Best Editing trophy is given to the editor.

Three editors have received the YCC Editing award twice:

- Jesus Navarro (Ikaw Pa Lang ang Minahal, 1992; and Milagros, 1997)
- Roberto Vasadre (Sana Pag-ibig Na, 1998; and Pila Balde, 1999)
- Vito Cajili (Malikmata, 2003; and Spirit of the Glass, 2004)

Year	Winner/s	Film
1990	George Jarlego	Gumapang Ka sa Lusak
1991	Ike Jarlego Jr.	Kailan Ka Magiging Akin
1992	Jesus Navarro	Ikaw Pa Lang ang Minahal
1993	Jose Almojuela	Aliwan Paradise
1994	Danny Gloria	Vampira
1995	Jaime Davila	Dahas
1996	Ruben Pantoja	Isla
1997	Jesus Navarro	Milagros
1998	Roberto Vasadre	Sana Pag-ibig Na
1999	Roberto Vasadre	Pila Balde
2000	Armando Jarlego	Bayaning Third World
2001	Tara Illenberger	Minsan May Isang Puso
2002	Francis Vinarao	Diskarte
2003	Vito Cajili	Malikmata
2004	Manet Dayrit; Vito Cajili	Sigaw; Spirit of the Glass
2005	Herbert Navasca	Masahista
2006	Randy Gabriel	Inang Yaya
2007	JD Domingo	Endo
2008	Aleks Castañeda	Adela
2009	Orlean Tan; Ralph Crisostomo; Miko Araneta	Engkwentro
2010	David Hukom; Jay Halili; Raymond Red	Himpapawid
2011	Charliebebs Gohetia	Señorita
2012	Arnel Barbarona; Gutierrez Mangansakan II	Qiyamah
2013	Aleks Castañeda; Jerrold Tarog	Porno; Pagpag: Siyam na Buhay
2014	Benjamin Tolentino	Mariquina
2015	Lawrence Ang	Salvage
2016	Carlo Francisco Manatad	Women of the Weeping River
2017	Shireen Seno; John Torres	Nervous Translation
2018	Victoria Chalk	Call Her Ganda
2019	Diego Marx Dobles	Verdict
2020	Mai Calapardo	He Who Is Without Sin

=== Best Achievement in Cinematography and Visual Design ===
Best Achievement in Cinematography and Visual Design refers to the mise-en-scene and its visual/plastic qualities production design, lighting, art direction, visual effects that lend form to whatever representation is projected on screen. The Best Cinematography and Visual Design honor is conferred on the cinematographer and the production designer.

Multiple category winners include:

For Cinematography:

- Jun Pereira (Bakit Kay Tagal ng Sandali?, 1990; and Kailan Ka Magiging Akin?, 1991)
- Rey de Leon (Babae sa Bubungang Lata, 1998; and Babae sa Breakwater, 2003)
- Yam Laranas (Ikaw Lamang Hanggang Ngayon, 2002; and Sigaw, 2004)
- Albert Banzon (Adela, 2008; and Kalayaan, 2012)

For Production Design:

- Charlie Arceo (Kailan Ka Magiging Akin?, 1991; and Ikaw Lang, 1993)
- Sammy Aranzamendez (Ikaw Lamang Hanggang Ngayon, 2002; and Sigaw, 2004)
- Adolfo Alix Jr. (Adela, 2008; and Kalayaan, 2012)

Year	Winners	Film
1990	Jun Pereira (Cinematography); Leo Abaya (Production Design)	Bakit Kay Tagal ng Sandali?
1991	Jun Pereira (Cinematography); Charlie Arceo (Production Design)	Kailan Ka Magiging Akin?
1992	Loreto Isleta (Cinematography); Raymond Bajarias (Production Design)	Tag-araw, Tag-ulan
1993	Jun Dalawis (Cinematography); Charlie Arceo (Production Design)	Ikaw Lang
1994	Johnny Araojo and Romulo Araojo (Cinematography); Benjie de Guzman (Production Design)	The Fatima Buen Story
1995	Romeo Vitug (Cinematography); Manny Morfe (Production Design)	The Flor Contemplacion Story
1996	Isagani Sioson (Cinematography); Lino Dalay and Willy Javier (Production Design)	Isla
1997	Eduardo Jacinto (Cinematography); Len Santos (Production Design)	Milagros
1998	Rey de Leon (Cinematography); James Quimson (Production Design)	Babae sa Bubungang Lata
1999	Shayne Clemente (Cinematography); Ronnie Cruz (Production Design)	Pila Balde
2000	Ding Achaocoso (Cinematography); Roy Lachica (Production Design)	Bayaning Third World
2001	Neil Daza (Cinematography); Max Paglinawan and Fernan Santiago (Production Design)	Yamashita: The Tiger's Treasure
2002	Yam Laranas (Cinematography); Sammy Aranzamendez (Production Design)	Ikaw Lamang Hanggang Ngayon
2003	Rey de Leon (Cinematography); Melody Teodoro (Production Design)	Babae sa Breakwater
2004	Yam Laranas (Cinematography); Sammy Aranzamendez (Production Design)	Sigaw
2005	Timmy Jimenez and Monchie Redoble (Cinematography); Benjamin Padero (Production Design)	Masahista
2006	Gary Gardoce (Cinematography); Reji Regalado (Production Design)	Inang Yaya
2007	Lav Diaz (Cinematography); Lav Diaz and Dante Perez (Production Design)	Death in the Land of Encantos
2008	Albert Banzon (Cinematography); Adolfo Alix Jr. and Jerome Zamora (Production Design)	Adela
2009	Ogi Sugatan (Cinematography); Jesus Lozada (Production Design)	Biyaheng Lupa
2010	Raymond Red (Cinematography); Danny Red (Production Design)	Himpapawid
2011	Dexter dela Peña (Cinematography); Paul Marquez (Production Design)	Teoriya
2012	Albert Banzon (Cinematography); Adolfo Alix Jr. (Production Design)	Kalayaan
2013	Nap Jamir (Cinematography); Edgar Martin Littaua (Production Design)	Lauriana
2014	Rommel Sales (Cinematography); Whammy Alcazaren & Tessa Tang (Production Design)	Dagitab
2015	Boy Yniguez, Lee Briones, Abi Lara, Santos Bayucca, Kidlat de Guia, Kawayan de Guia, and Kidlat Tahimik (Cinematography); Kidlat Tahimik (Production Design)	Balikbayan #1
2016	Raphael Meting and Mark Limbaga (Cinematography); Joel Geolamen (Production Design)	Baboy Halas
2017	T.M. Malones (Cinematography); Marielle Hizon (Production Design)	Baconaua
2018	Jewel Maranan (Cinematography)	Sa Palad ng Dantaong Kulang
2019	Isaac Banks (Cinematography); Maxwell Nalevansky and Clint Ramos (Production Design)	Lingua Franca
2020	Ante Cheng (Cinematography); Whammy Alcazaren and Thesa Tang (Production Design)	Death of Nintendo

=== Best Achievement in Sound and Aural Orchestration ===
Best Achievement in Sound and Aural Orchestration refers to the rendering of the auditory aspects of film music, natural sound, sound effects as these are counterposed against or harmonized with the language of image, and so become meaningful sign systems on their own. The Best Sound citation is awarded to the sound engineer and the musical scorer or music curator.

Multiple category winners include:

For Sound Design:

- Albert Michael Idioma (Curacha: Ang Babaeng Walang Pahinga, 1998; Phone Sex, 1999; Sugatang Puso, 2000; Minsan May Isang Puso, 2001; Dekada '70, 2002; Sigaw, 2004; and Porno, 2013)
- Ramon Reyes (Kung Mawawala Ka Pa, 1993; Sana Dalawa ang Puso Ko, 1994; Mumbaki, 1996; and Milagros, 1997)
- Arnold Reodica (Sigaw, 2004; and Ang Sayaw ng Dalawang Kaliwang Paa, 2011)
- Mark Locsin (Inang Yaya, 2006; and Endo, 2007)
- Ditoy Aguila (Adela, 2008; and Biyaheng Lupa, 2009)
- Mikko Quizon (Nervous Translation, 2017; and Never Not Love You, 2018)

For Music:

- Jesse Lucas (Phone Sex, 1999; Sugatang Puso, 2000; Minsan May Isang Puso, 2001; Babae sa Breakwater, 2003; and Sigaw, 2004)
- Nonong Buencamino (Sana Dalawa ang Puso Ko, 1994; Milagros, 1997; Dekada '70, 2002; and Inang Yaya, 2006)
- Ryan Cayabyab (Hihintayin Kita sa Langit, 1991; and Kung Mawawala Ka Pa, 1993)
- Jaime Fabregas (Mumbaki, 1996; and Curacha: Ang Babaeng Walang Pahinga, 1998)
- Jerrold Tarog (Masahista, 2005; and Shake, Rattle and Roll 12: Punerarya, 2010)

Year	Winners	Film
1990	No award given	No award given
1991	Ryan Cayabyab (Original Score); Gaudencio Barredo (Sound Design)	Hihintayin Kita sa Langit
1992	Vehnee Saturno (Original Score); Vic Macamay (Sound Design)	Hiram na Mukha
1993	Ryan Cayabyab (Original Score); Ramon Reyes (Sound Design)	Kung Mawawala Ka Pa
1994	Nonong Buencamino (Original Score); Ramon Reyes (Sound Design)	Sana Dalawa ang Puso Ko
1995	Jessie Lasaten (Original Score); Audio Post (Sound Design)	Dahas
1996	Jaime Fabregas (Original Score); Ramon Reyes (Sound Design)	Mumbaki
1997	Nonong Buencamino (Original Score); Ramon Reyes (Sound Design)	Milagros
1998	Jaime Fabregas (Original Score); Albert Michael Idioma (Sound Design)	Curacha: Ang Babaeng Walang Pahinga
1999	Jesse Lucas (Original Score); Albert Michael Idioma (Sound Design)	Phone Sex
2000	Lorrie Ilustre (Original Score), Noel Cruz Bruan and Raffy Baladjay Jr. (Sound Design); Jesse Lucas (Original Score) and Albert Michael Idioma (Sound Design)	Bayaning Third World; Sugatang Puso
2001	Nathan Brenholdt and Kormann Roque (Original Score) and Albert Michael Idioma (Sound Design); Jesse Lucas (Original Score) and Albert Michael Idioma (Sound Design)	Yamashita: The Tiger's Treasure; Minsan May Isang Puso
2002	Nonong Buencamino (Original Score); Albert Michael Idioma and Alex Tomboc (Sound Design)	Dekada '70
2003	Jesse Lucas (Original Score); Ross Diaz (Sound Design)	Babae sa Breakwater
2004	Jesse Lucas (Original Score); Albert Michael Idioma and Arnold Reodica (Sound Design)	Sigaw
2005	Jerrold Tarog (Original Score); Nonoy Dadivas and Rudy Gonzales (Sound Design)	Masahista
2006	Nonong Buencamino (Original Score); Mark Locsin and Angie Reyes (Sound Design)	Inang Yaya
2007	Owel Alvero (Original Score); Corinne de San Jose and Mark Locsin (Sound Design)	Endo
2008	Mark Locsin and Jojo Jacinto (Original Score); Ditoy Aguila and Junel Valencia (Sound Design)	Adela
2009	Gian Gianan (Original Score); Ditoy Aguila (Sound Design)	Biyaheng Lupa
2010	Jerrold Tarog (Original Score); Lamberto Casas Jr. (Sound Design)	Shake, Rattle and Roll 12: Punerarya
2011	Christine Muyco and Jema Pamintuan (Original Score); Arnold Reodica (Sound Design)	Ang Sayaw ng Dalawang Kaliwang Paa
2012	Teresa Barrozo (Original Score) and Ditoy Aguila (Sound Design); Raphael Pulgar (Original Score) and Arnel Barbarona (Sound Design)	Kalayaan; Qiyamah
2013	Ira Trofeo (Sound); Albert Michael Idioma (Sound Design)	Porno
2014	Jad Montenegro (Original Score); Maki Serapio, Wrap Meting, and Mark Limbaga (Sound Design)	Sonata Maria
2015	Los Indios de España and Shanto (Original Score); Ed de Guia (Sound Design)	Balikbayan #1
2016	Hiroko Nagai (Original Score); Jess Carlos (Sound Design)	Ang Tulay ng San Sebastian
2017	Itos Ledesma (Original Score); Mikko Quizon (Sound Design)	Nervous Translation
2018	Len Calvo (Original Score); Jason Conanan, Kat Salinas and Mikko Quizon (Sound Design)	Never Not Love You
2019	Glenn Barit (Music Curation); Daryl Libongco (Supervising Sound Editing); Nicole Amores, RJ Cantos and Aeriel Ellyzon Mallari (Sound Editing); John Michael Perez (Re-recording Mixing)	Cleaners
2020	Yudhi Arfani and Zeke Khaseli (Original Score); Andrew Milallos and Alec Rubay (Sound Design)	Death of Nintendo

=== Best First Feature ===
In 2013, the Young Critics Circle added a new category to their six existing awards as a recognition of the growing number of new filmmakers in the country. The Best First Feature award is given to the three most outstanding debut feature films (narrative, experimental, or documentary) of the year.

Year	Winners	Film
2013	Angustia; Puti; Ang Turkey Man Ay Pabo Rin	Kristian Sendon Cordero; Mike Alcazaren; Randolph Longjas
2014	Dagitab; Nick and Chai; Sonata Maria	Giancarlo Abrahan V Cha Escala and Wena Sanchez; Bagane Fiola
2015	Ari: My Life with a King; Dayang Asu; Miss Bulalacao	Carlo Enciso Catu; Bor Ocampo; Ara Chawdhury
2016	2 Cool 2 Be 4gotten Malinak Ya Labi	Petersen Vargas; Jose Abdel Langit
2017	Kiko Boksingero; Si Chedeng at si Apple; The Chanters	Thop Nazareno; Rae Red and Fatrick Tabada; James Robin Mayo
2018	Mamang; Mamu: And a Mother Too; Ang Pangarap Kong Holdap	Denise O'Hara; Rod Singh; Marius Talampas
2019	Cleaners; John Denver Trending; Verdict	Glenn Barit; Arden Rod Condez; Raymund Ribay Gutierrez
2020	Aswang; The Boy Foretold by the Stars; Magikland	Alyx Ayn Arumpac; Dolly Dulu; Christian Acuña

== See also ==
- Film awards bodies in the Philippines
