= Hindi Kita Malilimutan =

- Directed by: Jose Javier Reyes
- Written by: Jose Javier Reyes
- Produced by: Lily Monteverde; Roselle Monteverde; Douglas Quijano
- Starring: Aga Muhlach
- Cinematography: Romy Vitug
- Music by: Manoling Fernando
- Production company: Regal Films
- Distributed by: Regal Films
- Release date: May 30, 1993
- Running time: 111 minutes
- Country: Philippines
- Language: Filipino

Hindi Kita Malilimutan (I Won't Forget You) is a 1993 Filipino film written and directed by Jose Javier Reyes and stars Aga Muhlach and Carmina Villarroel. It tells the story of an unusual relationship between a brother and a sister. Rowena, an ambitious lass influenced by her peers is disgraced by her brother's illiteracy. A harmonious relationship is suddenly ruined.

== Cast ==
- Aga Muhlach as Nestor
- Carmina Villarroel as Rowena
- Maricel Laxa as Jocelyn
- Jomari Yllana as Lando
- Chanda Romero as Cita
- Paulie Yllana as Toffy
- Ramil Rodriguez as Congressman
- Gina Leviste as Congressman's wife
- Pocholo Montes as Peping
- Sunshine Cruz as Vicky
- Ericka Fife as Denise
- Ian Bernardo as Eric
- Charlie Davao as Anton
- Miguel Espinosa as Monchet
- Alan Paule as Frankie
- Mon Confiado as Simon

== Home media ==
This film was released on VHS in 1994 by Regal Home Video.

== Awards and nominations ==
Award-Giving Body	Category	Recipient	Result
Young Critics Circle
Young Critics Circle	Best Film	Hindi Kita Malilimutan	Won
Young Critics Circle	Best Screenplay	Jose Javier Reyes	Won
Young Critics Circle	Best Performance by Male or Female, Adult or Child, Individual or Ensemble in Leading or Supporting Role	Aga Muhlach	Won
