= Jaclyn Jose =

Filipino actress (1963–2024)

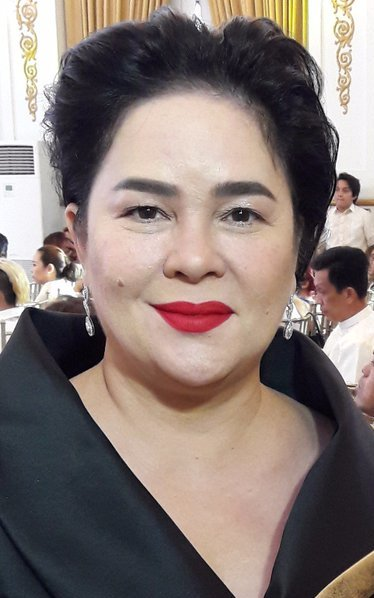
- Jose in February 2017
- Born: Mary Jane Santa Ana Guck; October 21, 1963; Angeles, Pampanga, Philippines
- Died: March 2, 2024 (aged 60); Quezon City, Philippines
- Resting place: Garden Of The Divine Word, Christ the King Mission Seminary, Quezon City
- Occupation: Actress
- Years active: 1981–2024
- Employer(s): ABS-CBN; GMA Network; RPN
- Agent(s): ABS-CBN (1995–2013; 2023–24); Sparkle GMA Artist Center (2013–23)
- Partner: Mark Gil (1988–1991)
- Children: 2, including Andi Eigenmann

Mary Jane Santa Ana Guck (October 21, 1963 – March 2, 2024), known professionally as Jaclyn Jose, was a Filipino actress. Known for her penetrating eyes and antagonistic roles in film and soap operas, she was a recipient of various accolades, including five Gawad Urians, two Luna Awards, and a FAMAS Award, in addition to an Asian Film Awards nomination. She is the only Filipino to win the Cannes Film Festival Award for Best Actress for the movie Ma' Rosa (2016). She was also described as the "Queen of Underacting" for her ability to deliver restrained and subtle performances.

Jose made her film acting debut in 1984, starring in dramas directed by William Pascual, Chito S. Roño and Lino Brocka, which earned her recognition in the Philippine movie awards circuit. In the 1990s, she began appearing in television soap operas. Jose was also honored by the National Commission for Culture and the Arts at the Ani ng Dangal ceremony in 2017. In 2023, she was awarded the Movie Icon Award by the Society of Philippine Entertainment Editors.

== Early life ==
Jaclyn Jose was born on October 21, 1963 as Mary Jane Guck in Angeles City, Pampanga. She was the second of six siblings which included her half-sister Veronica Jones, an actress in the 1970s and 1980s. Her mother, Rosalinda Santa Ana, was a zarzuela actress, while her father, Edward Lawrence Guck was an American serviceman of German descent stationed at Clark Air Base. Her parents separated when Jose was four years old.

== Career ==
=== Beginnings in film ===
Jose made her film acting debut in 1984 in back-to-back dramas in William Pascual's Chicas and Chito S. Roño's Private Show, earning her first FAMAS Awards nomination for the latter. In a 2021 interview, Jose said that she was initially reluctant to go into acting and deliberately played a subtle performance during her audition for Chicas in the hopes of not getting selected, only to discover that it was exactly what the judges had in mind. The following year, she starred in Lino Brocka's White Slavery, which earned her her first Gawad Urian nomination. Her first Gawad Urian win came from her role in the drama Takaw Tukso (1986), winning the Best Actress award. She won her first Luna Award for Best Supporting Actress in 1996 in The Flor Contemplacion Story (1995), for which also earned her her fourth Gawad Urian and fourth FAMAS Award nomination.

In 1986, Jose made her theater debut in the play Women, written by Joey Papa and directed by Joel Lamangan. She played the role of a rebel's wife and starred alongside Maria Isabel Lopez, Lala Montelibano, Daniel Fernando and Ricky Hora.

=== 1995–2000: Television appearances ===
Jose made her debut television appearance on ABS-CBN. She played Esther Lagrimas in the hit series Familia Zaragoza from 1995 to 1996. From 1997 to 1999, Jose played the role of Magda in the original 1997 series Mula sa Puso, before making her first appearance on Maalaala Mo Kaya. From 1999 to 2000, Jose played Elena Deogracias in the television series Labs Ko Si Babe.

=== 2002–2004: Network switch ===
After a two-year absence from television, Jose transferred to ABS-CBN's rival network, GMA and played Marianna Peron on the popular TV series Sana Ay Ikaw Na Nga. In early 2004, Jose had a recurring role as Carol in Te Amo, Maging Sino Ka Man with her co-star from Mula Sa Puso, Princess Punzalan. Later in 2004, she returned to ABS-CBN in an episode of Maalaala Mo Kaya.

=== 2004–2009: Return to ABS-CBN ===
In 2004, Jose returned to her ABS-CBN. Jose's first role as a major character was during the last quarter of 2004–2005, when she played Isabella in the television series Hiram. She also played a supporting role in SCQ Reload: Ok Ako! as Helen Roxas.

In 2005, she played another supporting role, Elena Cruz, in the popular TV series Ikaw ang Lahat sa Akin. She played Celeste Cristi in the TV series Komiks Presents: Agua Bendita in 2006, co-starring alongside Shaina Magdayao, Rayver Cruz, and Ramon Bagatsing.

Jose's next role was as Darlyn Fernandez in the 2007 show Sineserye Presents: May Minamahal. Later that year, she appeared in the fantasy anthology TV series Love Spell. In 2007–2008 Jose played the main role of Virgie Burgos in the show Prinsesa ng Banyera.

In 2008–2009, Jose was the villain Mariang Magayon in the TV series Dyosa.

=== 2009–2010: GMA Network and TV5 ===
Later in 2009, Jose returned to GMA Network to star in the Filipino series Zorro as Doña Chiquita Pelaez. This was her last appearance on GMA until 2013.

Jose then returned to ABS-CBN to guest star in an episode of Your Song in 2009. In the latter part of 2009–2010, Jose was cast as Minda Fernandez, one of the main villains in the show Nagsimula sa Puso.

In 2010, Jose was cast as the villain Astrud Quijano Crisanto in the series Kung Tayo'y Magkakalayo, or The Villain and Killer Influence. Later that year, she made her first appearance on TV5 when she guest starred on the show Star Confessions: Congratulations: The April Gustilo Confession.

=== 2011–2013: More projects and Valiente ===
In 2011, Jose appeared as a guest star in an episode of Your Song, playing Delfina. She also became part of the cast of Sabel, where she had the role of Bettina Zaragoza. She later guest starred on the anthology series Maalaala Mo Kaya and the fantasy series Wansapanataym. For her final project that year, Jose guest starred once again on Maalaala Mo Kaya. Jose played a supporting role of Luisa Alcantara-Delos Santos, Agnes's mother, in the series Reputasyon, acting alongside starring actress Cristine Reyes from 2011 to 2012.

Jose made her second appearance on TV5 in the 2012 remake of the popular 1990s series Valiente, where she played Doña Trinidad Braganza, a villain role originated by Odette Khan. Later that year, Jose returned to ABS-CBN to guest star in an episode of Maalaala Mo Kaya. From 2012 to 2013, she played a supporting role in Kahit Puso'y Masugatan as Esther Espiritu. This role marked her final appearance on ABS-CBN before transferring networks in the latter part of 2013.

=== 2013–2014: Return to GMA Network ===
In 2013, she returned to GMA, where she played the role of Doña Charito Vda de Carbonel in the popular 2013 series Mundo Mo'y Akin. Jose made a guest appearance on the TV series, My Husband's Lover as Doña Charito Vda de Carbonel, Elaine's snobbish friend, a crossover character from Mundo Mo'y Akin. She also guest starred in Bubble Gang as herself, Doña Charito, and Auntie Patty. She made her first guest appearance on The Ryzza Mae Show. She also reprised her role as Doña Charito in the TV series Vampire Ang Daddy Ko and played Elyvra, another villain in the same series. Jose guest starred on two episodes of the drama anthology Magpakailanman. She then played Manang Gilda, a recurring character in the series Akin Pa Rin ang Bukas. Jose acted in another episode of Magpakailanman. She then joined the cast of More Than Words, playing the role of Precy Balmores. Her final role in 2013 was as Agnes Toledo in Genesis.

In 2014, she acted in the series Carmela: Ang Pinakamagandang Babae sa Mundong Ibabaw, portraying Patricia "Trixie" Flores, the main antagonist of the show. Later that year, she acted in another episode of Magpakailanman and also played Conchita Monteverde in Ilustrado.

=== 2014–2015: More prominent roles and GMA News TV ===
In late 2014, Jose made her debut appearance on GMA Network's GMA News TV when she acted in an episode of Wagas. She played the role of veteran real-life actress Boots Anson-Roa. She also appeared in another episode of Magpakailanman.

Jose started in 2015 by guest starring on an episode of Magpakailanman. After that, she guest starred as Marissa on the Eat Bulaga: Lenten Special. In 2015 and 2016, Jose joined the cast of Marimar as the new version of the villain Señora Angelika Santibañez, who was originally played by Katrina Halili. She also played an extended role in the show Juan Tamad from 2015 to 2016.

=== 2016–2024: Final roles ===
In 2016, Jose was cast as the villain Stella Montecillo in the afternoon prime series The Millionaire's Wife. She then acted in an episode of Dear Uge. She briefly starred in Season 1 of Alyas Robin Hood as Judy de Jesus, the mother of the character played by Dingdong Dantes. Her life story was featured in the documentary series, Tunay na Buhay. Jose starred in the series A1 Ko Sa 'Yo, as Digna Molina, the main character of the show. The series aired after she won the Cannes Film Festival Award for Best Actress for the movie Ma' Rosa. Later that year, Jose guest starred on another episode of Wagas on GMA News TV.

In 2017, she starred in D' Originals as Josie Magpayo with LJ Reyes and Kim Domingo. Several months later, she again played Judy de Jesus in Season 2 of Alyas Robin Hood.

Despite being a contract artist of GMA Network, in 2023, she returned to ABS-CBN as guest to play as an anti-hero/protagonist in her final drama FPJ's Batang Quiapo as Dolores Espinas. Her character was still active in the series' storyline at the time of her death until April 15, 2024.

== Personal life and death ==
Jose raised her children— Andi Eigenmann (her daughter with actor Mark Gil and an actress in her own right) and Gwen Garimond Ilagan Guck (her son with musician Kenneth Ilagan)—as a single parent. Jose had met Gil on the production of their film Itanong Mo sa Buwan, and the two dated for two years. In her later years, she lived alone (apart from a housekeeper) in Quezon City. She had a farmhouse in Laguna.

Jose died in her home on the morning of March 2, 2024, at the age of 60. Andi Eigenmann confirmed heart attack as the cause of death.

Her remains were subsequently cremated. Her week-long private wake was held at the Arlington Memorial Chapel in Quezon City, which was followed by her private inurnment at the Garden of the Divine Word Columbary in Quezon City on March 10.

Representatives Arlene Brosas, France Castro and Raoul Manuel filed House of Representatives of the Philippines Resolution 1628, while Senators Jinggoy Estrada and Robin Padilla also filed Senate Resolution No. 942 honoring the legacy of Jose to Philippine cinema and expressing condolences.

== Filmography ==
=== Film ===
| Year | Title | Role | Notes | Source |
|---|---|---|---|---|
| 1984 | Chicas | | Credited as "Jaclyn Jose" | |
| 1985 | White Slavery | Linet | | |
| 1986 | Private Show | | | |
| 1986 | Flesh Avenue | Nelia | Credited as "Jacklyn Jose" | |
| 1986 | Magdusa Ka! | Hedy | Credited as "Jacklyn Jose" | |
| 1986 | Gabi Na, Kumander | Mayeng | Credited as "Jacklyn Jose" | |
| 1987 | Alabok sa Ulap | Hanah (Rey) Reyes | Credited as "Jacklyn Jose" | |
| 1987 | Jack & Jill | Aida | Credited as "Jacklyn Jose" | |
| 1987 | Working Girls 2 | Maya | Credited as "Jacklyn Jose" | |
| 1987 | Olongapo... The Great American Dream | Raquel | Credited as "Jacklyn Jose" | |
| 1988 | Hati Tayo sa Magdamag | Rochelle San Juan | Credited as "Jacklyn Jose" | |
| 1988 | Macho Dancer | Bambi | Credited as "Jacklyn Jose" | |
| 1988 | Celestina Sanchez, a.k.a. Bubbles – Enforcer: Ativan Gang | | | |
| 1988 | Itanong Mo sa Buwan | Josie Peralta | | |
| 1989 | Tatak ng Isang Api | | | |
| 1989 | Imortal | | | |
| 1990 | May Araw Ka Rin, Bagallon (WPD's Toughest Crime Busters) | | | |
| 1994 | Lab Kita... Bilib Ka Ba? | | | |
| 1994 | Sailor's Disaster | Olivia | | |
| 1994 | Multo in the City | Dolores | | |
| 1994 | Aswang | Rosing | | |
| 1994 | Shake, Rattle & Roll V | Mowie | "Anino" segment | |
| 1995 | The Flor Contemplacion Story | Neneng | | |
| 1996 | May Nagmamahal Sa'yo | Editha Sungcalan | | |
| 1996 | Dyesebel | Lucia | | |
| 1996 | Maruja | Azon | | |
| 1996 | Cedie | Annie | | |
| 1997 | Roberta | Sinay Robles | | |
| 1998 | Dahil Mahal Na Mahal Kita | Tita Myrna | | |
| 1998 | Masikip, Masakit, Mahapdi | | | |
| 1998 | Magandang Hatinggabi | Gloria | | |
| 1998 | Puso ng Pasko | Belle | | |
| 1999 | Mula sa Puso: The Movie | Magda | | |
| 1999 | Seventeen... So Kaka | Chelay | | |
| 2000 | Pedrong Palad | Lorelei | | |
| 2000 | Deathrow | Gina | | |
| 2001 | Tuhog | Violita | | |
| 2001 | Minsan May Isang Puso | Unknown | | |
| 2004 | Naglalayag | Lorena Garcia | | |
| 2004 | Aishite Imasu 1941: Mahal Kita | Tiyang Mabel | | |
| 2005 | Anak ni Brocka | Angela dela Cruz | | |
| 2005 | Sarong Banggi | Melba | | |
| 2005 | The Masseur | Natie | | |
| 2006 | Pamahiin | Aling Beleinda | | |
| 2006 | Eternity | Narcessa | | |
| 2006 | Donsol | Ligaya | | |
| 2006 | Barang | Ramona | | |
| 2006 | Ang Pamana: The Inheritance | Unknown | | |
| 2006 | Mano Po 5: Gua Ai Di | Donita | | |
| 2007 | Angels | Celia | | |
| 2007 | Idol: Pag-asa ng Bayan | Donna | | |
| 2007 | Ataul: For Rent | Pining | | |
| 2007 | Tirado | Zeny | | |
| 2007 | Nars | Mrs. Alona | | |
| 2008 | Service | Nayda | | |
| 2008 | Tingala sa Pugad | Lilya (Post Production) | | |
| 2009 | Sundo | Mercedes | | |
| 2010 | Tingala sa Pugad | Sulay | | |
| 2010 | You to Me Are Everything | Florencia | | |
| 2011 | The Road | Susan | | |
| 2012 | A Secret Affair | Ellen | | |
| 2013 | My Little Bossings | Marga Atienza | | |
| 2015 | Felix Manalo | Tiya Victorina | Uncredited | |
| 2015 | The Prenup | Sofia Billones | | |
| 2016 | Ma' Rosa | Rosa | | |
| 2016 | Patay na si Hesus | Maria Fatima "Iyay" | | |
| 2017 | Mang Kepweng Returns | Milagros Rivera | | |
| 2018 | Fantastica | Perfecta "Fec" Padilla | | |
| 2019 | Kalel, 15 | Edith | | |
| 2020 | Magikland | | | |
| 2020 | Mang Kepweng: Ang Lihim ng Bandanang Itim | Milagros | | |
| 2021 | Anak ng Macho Dancer | Bambi | | |
| 2021 | The Housemaid | Ms. Martha | | |
| 2022 | Broken Blooms | Jocelyn Gonzaga | | |
| 2023 | Broken Hearts Trip | (One of the Three Judges) | Final film appearance | |
| 2026 | Poon | | Final film supporting | |

=== Television ===
| Year | Title | Role | Notes | Source |
|---|---|---|---|---|
| 1983–87 | Student Canteen | Herself / Performer | Co-Host | |
| 1987–89 | Superstar | Co-host | | |
| 1995–96 | Familia Zaragoza | Ester Lagrimas | | |
| 1997–1999 | Mula sa Puso | Magdalena "Magda" Magbanua-Pereira | | |
| 1999 | Maalaala Mo Kaya | Mom | Episode Guest: "Tula" | |
| 1999–2000 | Labs Ko Si Babe | Elena Deogracias | | |
| 2000 | Kakabakaba | | Episode Guest: "The Feast" | |
| 2001–03 | Sana ay Ikaw na Nga | Mariana Madrigal-Fulgencio / Mariana Madrigal-Peron | | |
| 2004 | Te Amo, Maging Sino Ka Man | Carol Canonigo | | |
| 2004 | Maalaala Mo Kaya | Sandy | Episode Guest: "Upuan" | |
| 2004–2005 | Hiram | Isabella | | |
| 2004 | SCQ Reload: Ok Ako! | Helen Roxas | | |
| 2005 | Ikaw ang Lahat sa Akin | Elena Cruz | | |
| 2006 | Makita Ka Lang Muli | Various Roles | | |
| 2007 | Sineserye Presents: May Minamahal | Darlyn Fernandez | | |
| 2007 | Love Spell | Adana | Episode Guest: "Bumalaka, Bulalakaw, Boom" | |
| 2007–08 | Prinsesa ng Banyera | Virgie Burgos | | |
| 2008–09 | Dyosa | Mariang Magayon | | |
| 2009 | Zorro | Doña Chiquita Pelaez | | |
| 2009 | Your Song | Josie Salcedo | Episode Guest: "Babalik Kang Muli" | |
| 2009–10 | Nagsimula sa Puso | Minda Fernandez | | |
| 2010 | Kung Tayo'y Magkakalayo | Astrud Quijano | | |
| 2010 | Star Confessions | Ester | Episode Guest: "Congratulations: The April Gustilo Confession" | |
| 2011 | Your Song | Delfina | Episode Guest: "Andi" (Note: Jose starred as a guest star with her daughter, Andi Eigenmann.) | |
| 2011 | Sabel | Dra. Bettina Imperial-Zaragosa | | |
| 2011 | Maalaala Mo Kaya | Amparo | Episode Guest: "Tsinelas" | |
| 2011 | Wansapanataym | Ria | Episode Guest: "Vanishing Vanessa" | |
| 2011 | Maalaala Mo Kaya | Eugenia Sanchez | Episode Guest: "Bisikleta" | |
| 2011–2012 | Reputasyon | Luisa Alcantara-Delos Santos | | |
| 2012 | Valiente | Trinidad "Trining" Delos Santos (Ramirez)-Braganza (Note: Jose portrayed the remake version of Trinidad Braganza in the 2012 remake version.) | | |
| 2012 | Maalaala Mo Kaya | Virginia | Episode Guest: "Bahay" | |
| 2012–13 | Kahit Puso'y Masugatan | Esther Gerona-Espiritu | | |
| 2013 | Mundo Mo'y Akin | Doña Charito Vda. de Carbonel | | |
| 2013 | My Husband's Lover | Doña Charito Vda. de Carbonel | | (Note: Jose plays a fictional crossover character in this series, portraying the same character she played in Mundo Mo'y Akin.) |
| 2013 | The Ryzza Mae Show | Herself | | |
| 2013 | Vampire ang Daddy Ko | Doña Charito Vda. de Carbonel | Crossover Character | (Note: Jose plays a fictional crossover character in this series, portraying the same character she played in Mundo Mo'y Akin, as Charito Carbonel.) |
| 2013 | Tunay na Buhay | Herself | | (Note: Jose's life was featured in this episode.) |
| 2013 | Magpakailanman | Minda | Episode Guest: "Nasayang na Jackpot: The Dionie Reyes Story" | |
| 2013 | Magpakailanman | Mommy Alina Sexy | Episode Guest: "My Beautiful Daughter: The Maxino Family Story" | |
| 2013 | Akin Pa Rin ang Bukas | Manang Gilda | | |
| 2014 | Bubble Gang | Herself / Ate Patty Moran / Doña Charito Vda. de Carbonel (Note: Jose played a crossover character reprising her role once again as Charito Carbonel, from a series she starred in entitled Mundo Mo'y Akin.) | | |
| 2014 | Carmela: Ang Pinakamagandang Babae sa Mundong Ibabaw | Patricia "Trixie" Torres | Credited as "Jacklyn Jose"; 83 episodes | |
| 2014 | Kambal Sirena | Benita Samaniego | | |
| 2014 | Vampire ang Daddy Ko | Elvyra (Note: Jose re-entered the series playing a different role, she became a series regular.) | | |
| 2014 | Magpakailanman | Carmelita | Episode Guest: "My Love Forever" | |
| 2014 | Ilustrado | Conchita Monteverde | | |
| 2014 | Magpakailanman | Arcing | Episode Guest: "Kulam ng Paghihiganti" | |
| 2014–15 | More Than Words | Precy Balmores | | |
| 2014 | Wagas | Boots Anson-Roa | Episode Guest: "Boots & King Love Story" | |
| 2014 | Magpakailanman | Eleanor | Episode Guest: "Sa Bangin na Kamatayan" | |
| 2015 | Magpakailanman | Nanay Ilda | Episode Guest: "Hakbang Tungo sa Pangarap" | |
| 2015 | Eat Bulaga Lenten Special | Marissa | Episode Guest: "Pangako ng Pag-ibig" | |
| 2015–16 | Marimar | Señora Angelika Santibañez† (Note: Jose played the remake version of Angelika Santibañez, originally portrayed by Katrina Halili in the 2007 version.) | | |
| 2015–16 | Juan Tamad | Minerva / Miracle Product Recruiter | | |
| 2016 | That's My Amboy | Mrs. Ventura | | |
| 2016 | The Millionaire's Wife | Stella Vergara-Montecillo | | |
| 2016 | Dear Uge | Menchu | Episode Guest: "Kapit-bahay" | |
| 2016 | A1 Ko Sa 'Yo | Digna Molina | | |
| 2016 | Wagas | Medel | Episode Guest: "That's My Dream Bae" | |
| 2016 | Lip Sync Battle Philippines | Herself | (Note: Jose was the grand winner of the competition.) | |
| 2016–17 | Alyas Robin Hood | Judy De Jesus | | |
| 2017 | Magpakailanman | Angie | Episode Guest: "Losing Jeffrey, Finding Jayson" | |
| 2017 | D' Originals | Jocelyn "Josie" Flores | | |
| 2017 | Alyas Robin Hood | Judy De Jesus / Senyora Victorina Deogracia y Villadolid | | |
| 2017–2018 | My Korean Jagiya | Charlotte "Chiclet" TIborcia | | |
| 2018 | Magpakailanman | Ruth | Episode Guest: "Victim of Bullying" | |
| 2018 | The Cure | Evangeline Lazaro | | |
| 2019 | TODA One I Love | Princess | | |
| 2019 | The Better Woman | Erlinda Santos | | |
| 2019 | Dear Uge | Myrna | Episode Guest: "Sana ay bading ka na lang" | |
| 2021 | Wish Ko Lang | Lorna | Episode Guest: "Sa Piling ni Nanay" | |
| 2021 | Tadhana | Teresa | Episode Guest: "Bekiry Part 1 / 2" | |
| 2021 | Daddy's Gurl | Rose Di Mabiro | Episode Guest: "The Ulitmate [sic] Barakbakan" | |
| 2021–22 | The World Between Us | Jacinta "Yachie" Delgado | | |
| 2021 | Nagbabagang Luha | Mercy Ignacio | | |
| 2022 | Bolera | Tessa Fajardo | | |
| 2022 | Jose & Maria's Bonggang Villa | Paring | Episode Guest: "Season Finale" | |
| 2023 | Magpakailanman | Andeng | Episode Guest: "Bayad Utang" | |
| 2023–24 | FPJ's Batang Quiapo | Jail Chief Supt. / Brig. Gen. Dolores Espinas | (Jose's finale & last television series, appearance before her death); Posthumous Appearances (March 4–April 15, 2024) | |

=== Theater ===
| Year | Title | Role | Source |
|---|---|---|---|
| 1986 | Women | | |

== Awards and nominations ==
Asian Film Awards
| Year | Nominated work | Category | Result |
|---|---|---|---|
| 2009 | Serbis | Best Supporting Actress | Nominated |

Cannes Film Festival
| Year | Nominated work | Category | Result |
|---|---|---|---|
| 2016 | Ma' Rosa | Best Actress | Won |

FAMAS (Filipino Academy of Movie Arts and Sciences Awards)
| Year | Nominated work | Category | Result |
|---|---|---|---|
| 1987 | Private Show | Best Actress | Nominated |
| 1989 | Itanong mo sa Buwan | Best Actress | Nominated |
| 1990 | Macho Dancer | Best Supporting Actress | Nominated |
| 1996 | The Flor Contemplacion Story | Best Supporting Actress | Nominated |
| 1997 | Mulanay: Sa Pusod ng Paraiso | Best Actress | Nominated |
| 2000 | Mula sa Puso | Best Supporting Actress | Nominated |
| 2013 | A Secret Affair | Best Supporting Actress | Won |

Gawad Urian
| Year | Nominated work | Category | Result |
|---|---|---|---|
| 1986 | White Slavery | Best Actress | Nominated |
| 1987 | Misis Mo, Misis Ko | Best Actress | Nominated |
| 1987 | Takaw Tukso | Best Actress | Won (Note: Shared with Pilar Pilapil for Napakasakit Kuya Eddie) |
| 1989 | Misis Mo, Misis Ko | Best Supporting Actress | Nominated |
| 1989 | Itanong Mo sa Buwan | Best Actress | Won |
| 1990 | Macho Dancer | Best Supporting Actress | Won |
| 1996 | The Flor Contemplacion Story | Best Supporting Actress | Won |
| 1997 | Mulanay: Sa Pusod ng Dagat | Best Actress | Nominated |
| 1997 | May Nagmamahal Sa'yo | Best Supporting Actress | Nominated |
| 1999 | Curacha: Ang Babaeng Walang Pahinga | Best Supporting Actress | Nominated |
| 2001 | Tuhog | Best Supporting Actress | Nominated |
| 2002 | Minsan May Isang Puso | Best Actress | Nominated |
| 2006 | Sarong Banggi | Best Actress | Won |
| 2009 | Serbis | Best Actress | Nominated |

Luna Awards
| Year | Nominated work | Category | Result |
|---|---|---|---|
| 1996 | The Flor Contemplacion Story | Best Supporting Actress | Won |
| 2005 | Naglalayag | Best Supporting Actress | Won |

Golden Screen Awards for Movies
| Year | Nominated work | Category | Result |
|---|---|---|---|
| 2005 | Naglalayag | Best Supporting Actress | Nominated |
| 2006 | Sarong Banggi | Best Actress | Nominated |
| 2008 | Ataul: For Rent | Best Actress | Nominated |

Star Awards for Movies
| Year | Nominated work | Category | Result |
|---|---|---|---|
| 1987 | Private Show | Best Actress | Won |
| 1989 | Itanong Mo sa Buwan | Best Actress | Won |
| 1990 | Macho Dancer | Best Supporting Actress | Won |
| 1996 | The Flor Contemplacion Story | Best Supporting Actress | Won |
| 2013 | A Secret Affair | Best Supporting Actress | Nominated |

Young Critics Circle
| Year | Nominated work | Category | Result |
|---|---|---|---|
| 1996 | The Flor Contemplacion Story | Best Performance by Male or Female, Adult or Child, Individual or Ensemble in Leading or Supporting Role | Nominated |
| 1997 | May Nagmamahal Sa'yo | Best Performance by Male or Female, Adult or Child, Individual or Ensemble in Leading or Supporting Role | Nominated |
| 2002 | Minsan May Isang Puso | Best Performance by Male or Female, Adult or Child, Individual or Ensemble in Leading or Supporting Role | Won |
| 2006 | Masahista | Best Performance by Male or Female, Adult or Child, Individual or Ensemble in Leading or Supporting Role | Nominated |
| 2010 | Byaheng Lupa | Best Performance by Male or Female, Adult or Child, Individual or Ensemble in Leading or Supporting Role | Nominated |

Metro Manila Film Festival
| Year | Nominated work | Category | Result |
|---|---|---|---|
| 1988 | Celestina Sanchez, Alyas Bubbles/ Enforcer: Ativan Gang | Best Supporting Actress | Won |
