= Jinri Park =

South Korean model and DJ (born 1988)

- 박진리
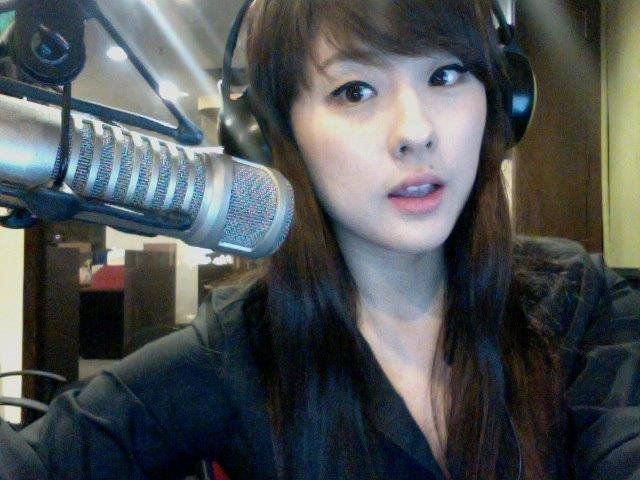
- Park in 2015
- Born: April 24, 1988 (age 38); Incheon, South Korea
- Occupations: Actress; model; DJ
- Years active: 2011–2018

Korean name
- Hangul: 박진리
- Hanja: 朴真理
- RR: Bak Jinri
- MR: Pak Chilli

Park Jin-ri (Korean: 박진리; Hanja: 朴真理; born April 24, 1988) is a South Korean model, DJ, actress and magazine columnist who is based in the Philippines. Park worked as a DJ at Monster Radio RX 93.1 from 2011 to 2015 and is starting a career as an actress and TV host.

== Filmography ==
=== Television series ===
Year	Show	Role	Notes
2013	Vampire ang Daddy Ko	Jin	Cast member
2013	The Ryzza Mae Show	Herself	Guest
2015	KISPinoy	Herself	Co-host
2015	Pop Talk	Herself	Analyst
2015	Little Nanay	Portia	Extended role
2016	Juan Happy Love Story	Lyla	Guest role
2016	Pinoy Big Brother: Lucky 7	Herself	Celebrity Housemate
2017	Encantadia	Hera Juvila	Guest Cast / Antagonist
2017	Road Trip	Herself	Episode guest
2017	My Korean Jagiya	Hannah Lee/Lee Kyung-ha	Supporting role / Antagonist
2018	Tadhana: My Korean Fairy Tale	Soo Jung	Episode Guest

=== Web shows ===
Year	Show	Role
2015	Jinrilationships	Host
2015	Tanods	Bheybs

== Awards and nominations ==
=== FHM Sexiest Woman ===
Park first appeared on FHM Philippines in May 2011, reappeared again in August 2011 and March 2012, which become as a FHM favorite. She appeared on the gravure book, The Jinri Experience release by Summit Media, the publisher of FHM, and finally as cover girl in August 2013, as she reached Top 10 in 2014 Sexiest Woman list, and again in 2015

Year	Critics	Award	Result
2011	FHM Philippines	Philippine Sexiest Finest	Rank # 79
2012	FHM Philippines	Philippine Sexiest Finest	Rank # 21
2013	FHM Philippines	Philippine Sexiest Finest	Rank # 13
2014	FHM Philippines	Philippine Sexiest Finest	Rank # 10
2015	FHM Philippines	Philippine Sexiest Finest	Rank # 7

== Personal life ==
On March 22, 2020, Jinri revealed that she married a Filipino-Australian named John in Sydney, Australia. Since moving, she started studying at university and started working part time.

== See also ==
- Grace Lee
- Sam Oh

Preceded by Alodia Gosiengfiao	FHM Cover Girl (August 2013)	Succeeded by Rufa Mae Quinto
