= My Korean Jagiya =

Philippine television drama series

- Title card
- Original title: 한국인 자기야
- Genre: Drama; Romantic comedy
- Created by: Jonathan Cruz
- Written by: Denoy Navarro-Punio; Ken de Leon; Marlon Miguel; Christine Novicio
- Directed by: Mark A. Reyes V
- Creative director: Roy Iglesias
- Starring: Heart Evangelista; Alexander Lee
- Theme music composer: Janno Gibbs
- Opening theme: "My Jagiya" by Janno Gibbs and Denise Barbacena
- Country of origin: Philippines
- Original languages: Tagalog; Korean
- No. of episodes: 105 (list of episodes)

Production
- Executive producer: Winnie Hollis-Reyes
- Production locations: Manila, Philippines; Seoul, South Korea; Bataan, Philippines; Hong Kong
- Editors: Maita Dator-Causapin; Lara Linsangan; Ron Joseph Suñer
- Camera setup: Multiple-camera setup
- Running time: 26–45 minutes
- Production company: GMA Entertainment TV

Original release
- Network: GMA Network
- Release: August 21, 2017 – January 12, 2018

My Korean Jagiya (transl. my Korean honey / Korean: 한국인 자기야; RR: Hangugin Jagiya) is a Philippine television drama romance comedy series broadcast by GMA Network. Directed by Mark A. Reyes V, it stars Heart Evangelista and Alexander Lee in the title role. It premiered on August 21, 2017, on the network's Telebabad line up. The series concluded on January 12, 2018, with a total of 105 episodes.

The series is streaming online on YouTube.

== Premise ==
Gia often teased that she is next in her family to become an old maid, is a Korean drama fan with determination to meet her long-time crush and former Korean superstar Kim Jun-ho, who has since stepped out of the limelight. When her school offers her a scholarship training in Seoul, she grabs the opportunity to try and find Jun-ho, but ends up coming home disappointed. Back in Manila, she helps a drunk Korean guy beaten by gangsters which turned out to be Jun-ho.

== Cast and characters ==
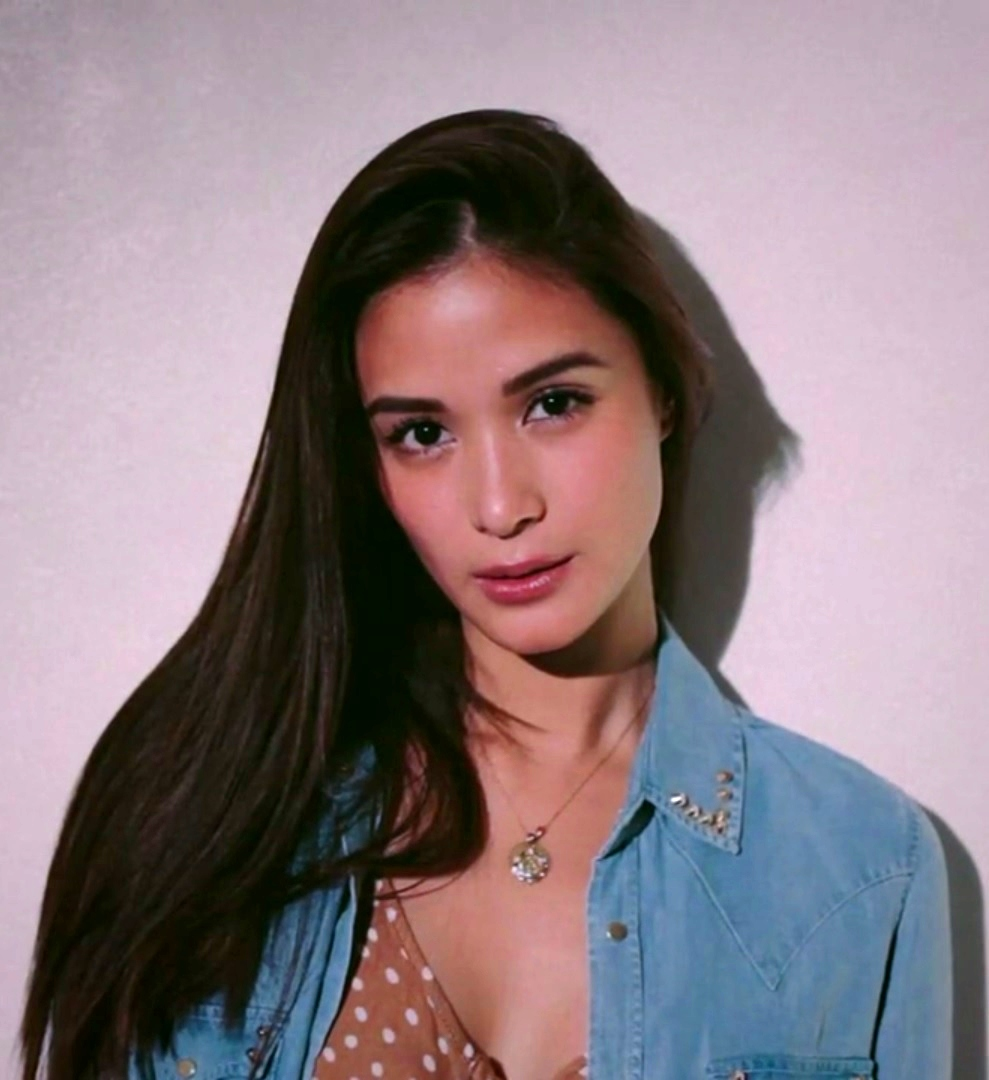
Heart Evangelista portrays Gia Asuncion.

Lead cast

- Heart Evangelista as Guadalupe Immaculada "Gia" Asuncion-Kim
- Alexander Lee as Kim Jun-ho

Supporting cast

- Janice de Belen as Adelaida "Aida" Asuncion
- Ricky Davao as Joselito "Josie" Asuncion
- Iya Villania as Kennedy Santos
- Edgar Allan Guzman as Ryan Patrick Maalba
- Valeen Montenegro as Cindy / Cinnamon
- Frances Makil-Ignacio as Caridad "Carrie" Washington
- Myke Solomon as Kerwin
- Jinri Park as Lee Kyung-ha / Hannah Lee
- Divine Aucina as Clarissa Asuncion
- Khaine Hernandez as Paolo "Pao" Kim

Recurring cast

- Shelly Hipolito as Scarlet Asuncion
- Gileth Sandico as Pebbles Asuncion-Santos
- Don Martin as Rocky Santos
- Raymart Santiago as Dodong "Dong" / "Doods" Garcia

Guest cast

- Kim Jung-wook as Kim Ji-hu
- Oh Min-lee (Michelle Oh) as Kim Yea-jin
- Lee Hae-ri as Choi
- Kim Sun-hi as Jun-ho's interviewer
- Dasuri Choi as a film actress
- Rob Sy as Gia's workmate
- Liezel Lopez as Nadine
- Erlinda Villalobos as Dora Asuncion
- Boboy Garovillo as Ernesto Garcia
- Dexter Doria as Ludivina Garcia
- Mickey Ferriols as Carmela “Mel” Tuazon
- Andy Ryu as Lee Gong-woo
- Jaclyn Jose as Charlotte "Chiclet" TIborcia
- Cheska Iñigo as Amanda de Gracia

== Production ==
Principal photography commenced in June 2017. The series was the first Philippine television drama series produced by GMA Network to be filmed in Seoul, South Korea.

== Ratings ==
According to AGB Nielsen Philippines' Nationwide Urban Television Audience Measurement People in television homes, the pilot episode of My Korean Jagiya earned a 6.6% rating. The final episode scored an 8.5% rating.
