= List of foreign films shot in the Philippines =

Numerous foreign films have been shot in the Philippines either partly or entirely, with the locations either representing itself or standing in for another location. This article presents a partial list of films which have used shooting locations in the Philippines sorted by year. The list exclude co-produced films with involvement of Philippine production companies.

== List ==
=== Films primarily shot in the Philippines ===
| Year | Title | Director/s | Actors | Filming location/s in the Philippines | Film setting (if not in the Philippines) | Country of origin of production companies | Note | Ref. |
|---|---|---|---|---|---|---|---|---|
| 1958 | Cavalry Command | Eddie Romero | John Agar | Vigan, Ilocos Sur | | United States, Philippines | | |
| 1979 | Apocalypse Now | Francis Ford Coppola | Martin Sheen, Marlon Brando, Robert Duvall, Frederic Forrest | Baler Bay (Baler, Aurora), Baler (Aurora), Pagsanjan (Laguna), Iba (Zambales), Pagsanjan River (Pagsanjan, Laguna), Laguna, Metro Manila | South Vietnam | United States | | |
| 1984 | Missing in Action | Joseph Zito | Chuck Norris | Quezon, Laguna, Cavite | Vietnam | United States | | |
| 1986 | Platoon | Oliver Stone | Tom Berenger, Willem Dafoe, Charlie Sheen, Keith David, Kevin Dillon, John C. McGinley, Forest Whitaker, Johnny Depp | Mount Makiling, Laguna, Cavite, Villamor Air Base near Manila | Vietnam | United States, United Kingdom | | |
| 1990 | Delta Force 2: The Colombian Connection | Aaron Norris | Chuck Norris, John P. Ryan, Billy Drago, Richard Jaeckel | Clark Air Force Base, Metro Manila, Tagaytay (Cavite) | South America | United States | Although the film is set principally in South America, most of the scenes set in the fictional South American country of San Carlos and rural Colombia were shot in Tagaytay, Philippines. This explains the visibility of the Taal Volcano in some scenes. | |
| 1999 | Brokedown Palace | Jonathan Kaplan | Claire Danes, Kate Beckinsale, Bill Pullman, Lim Kay Tong | Coconut Palace (Pasay City, Metro Manila), Sanctuary Fabella (Manila, Metro Manila), Cotton Club (Pasay City, Metro Manila), Manila Hotel (Manila, Metro Manila), Manila Rendezvous (Manila, Metro Manila), Manila (Metro Manila) | Thailand | United States | Since Thailand refused the shooting of the movie in their place due to its critical view on the Thai legal system, the production was filmed most in the Philippines where it depicts Thailand instead. Ultimately, Claire Danes was banned permanently in Manila by the city council after finishing filming for remarks made about the city in Vogue and Premier. | |
| 2008 | Romantic Island | Kang Chul-woo | Lee Sun-kyun | Boracay Islands (Malay, Aklan), Binondo, Manila (Metro Manila) | —N/a | South Korea | | |
| 2013 | Metro Manila | Sean Ellis | Jake Macapagal, John Arcilla, Althea Vega, Erin Panlilio | Manila (Metro Manila) | —N/a | United Kingdom | Although Filipino language was a secondary and was shot primarily in Metro Manila, the film involved wasn't a co-production with a Philippine-based studio. | |
| 2016 | Master | Cho Ui-seok | Lee Byung-hun, Gang Dong-won and Kim Woo-bin | Binondo, Intramuros, Bulacan, Cebu | —N/a | South Korea | | |
| 2016 | Showdown in Manila | Mark Dacascos | Alexander Nevsky, Casper Van Dien, Cary-Hiroyuki Tagawa, Tia Carrere | Manila (Metro Manila) | —N/a | United States | | |
| 2018 | When the Storm Fades | Sean Devlin | Ryan Beil, Alicia Boco, Marissa Cabalja, Kayla Lorette | Leyte | —N/a | Canada | | |
| 2020 | The Golden Holiday | Bong-han Kim | Do-won Kwak, Dae-Myung Kim, Hee-won Kim, Kim Sang-Ho | Manila | —N/a | South Korea | | |

=== Films partially shot in the Philippines ===
| Year | Title | Director/s | Actors | Filming location/s in the Philippines | Film setting (if not in the Philippines) | Country of origin of production companies | Note | Ref. |
|---|---|---|---|---|---|---|---|---|
| 1982 | The Year of Living Dangerously | Peter Weir | Mel Gibson, Sigourney Weaver, Linda Hunt, Bembol Roco | Quiapo (Manila), Banaue Rice Terraces | Jakarta, Indonesia | Australia, United States | Originally set to be filmed in Jakarta, but permission to film in Indonesia was denied, so the film was shot in the Philippines as a stand-in for Jakarta and Indonesia. However, the film was banned temporarily in Indonesia until 2000. | |
| 1989 | Born on the Fourth of July | Oliver Stone | Tom Cruise, Kyra Sedgwick, Raymond J. Barry, Jerry Levine, Frank Whaley, Willem Dafoe | —N/a | Vietnam | United States | Stone was unable to shot to Vietnam due to US-Vietnam relations were almost deteriorated. However, it went filming to the Philippines again like Platoon did, but was shot partially, where the location was unknown for the jungle scene as a setting. | |
| 1995 | Closer to Home | Joseph Nobile | Madeline Ortaliz, John Michael Bolger, Elizabeth Bracco, Joonee Gamboa, Vic Diaz, Ray Ventura, Lou Veloso, Tony Mabesa, James Lorinz, Jane Gabbert, Ching Valdes-Aran | Ninoy Aquino International Airport (Pasay City, Metro Manila), Talisay (Batangas), Alaminos (Laguna), Batangas City (Batangas), Candelaria (Quezon), Lucban (Quezon), Rosario, San Juan, Taal Lake (Batangas), Tagaytay Ridge (Tagaytay City, Cavite), BLTB Bus Terminal (Pasay City, Metro Manila), South Expressway (Metro Manila) | | United States | | |
| 1999 | Man on the Moon | Milos Forman | Jim Carrey, Danny DeVito, Courtney Love, Paul Giamatti | Baguio City | —N/a | United Kingdom, Germany, Japan, United States | Andy Kaufman, finds out his diagnosis with cancer, he travels to the Philippines and went to the hospital from Baguio to treat his health. The film was shot partially in Baguio General Hospital and Medical Center. | |
| 2000 | Thirteen Days | Roger Donaldson | Kevin Costner | — | Cuba | United States | The air base scene was taken at Clark Air Base, Philippines, a former American facility, which substituted for NAS Key West, Florida, where the actual RF-8As of Light Photographic Squadron SIX TWO (VFP-62) launched from on their Cuban overflight missions. | |
| 2006 | Tazza: The High Rollers | Dong-hoon Choi | Cho Seung-woo, Yun-shik Baek, Kim Hye-su, Hae-Jin Yoo | Subic (Zambales) | —N/a | South Korea | | |
| 2009 | I Come with the Rain | Anh Hung Tran | Josh Hartnett, Nu Yên-Khê Tran, Lee Byung-hun, Takuya Kimura | Compostela Valley (Mindanao), Davao City (Mindanao), Diwalwal (Monkayo, Compostela Valley, Mindanao) | —N/a | France, Hong Kong, Ireland, United Kingdom | | |
| 2009 | Mammoth | Lukas Moodysson | Gael García Bernal, Michelle Williams | Morong (Bataan), Sabang (Bataan), Subic (Zambales) | —N/a | Sweden, Denmark, Germany | | |
| 2009 | Wangan Midnight: The Movie | Atsushi Muroga | Ryôko Kobayashi, Kazuki Katô, Yoshihiko Hakamada, Shinichiro Ishikawa | Metro Manila Skyway (Metro Manila), North Luzon Expressway (Bulacan), South Luzon Expressway (Laguna), Manila–Cavite Expressway (Cavite) | —N/a | Japan | For the expressway racing scene. | |
| 2012 | The Bourne Legacy | Tony Gilroy | Jeremy Renner, Rachel Weisz, Edward Norton, Scott Glenn | El Nido (Palawan), Manila (Metro Manila), Jones Bridge (Binondo, Manila, Metro Manila), Taft Avenue MRT station (Pasay City, Metro Manila), Ramon Magsaysay Boulevard (Manila, Metro Manila) | —N/a | United States | | |
| 2013 | No Breathing | Jo Yong-sun | Seo In-guk, Lee Jong-suk, Kwon Yuri | Davao | —N/a | South Korea | The film was shot partially in Davao City where the overseas field training scenes. | |
| 2014 | Rupan sansei (Lupin the 3rd) | Ryûhei Kitamura | Shun Oguri, Jerry Yan, Tetsuji Tamayama, Gô Ayano | Metro Manila | —N/a | Japan | | |
| 2015 | American Ultra | Nima Nourizadeh | Jesse Eisenberg, Kristen Stewart, Topher Grace, Connie Britton, Walton Goggins, John Leguizamo, Bill Pullman, Tony Hale | Manila | —N/a | United States | | |
| 2017 | A Prayer Before Dawn | Jean-Stéphane Sauvaire | Joe Cole, Cherry Miko, Vithaya Pansringarm, Panya Yimmumphai | Cebu City | —N/a | United Kingdom, United States, France | | |
| 2017 | Bluebeard | Lee Soo-yeon | Cho Jin-woong, Kim Dae-myung | Metro Manila | —N/a | South Korea | The film was shot partially in Ninoy Aquino International Airport at the end of the film, where the Korean teenager met his mother (portrayed by Marie-Joelle Afarti), who was Filipina. | |
| 2017 | xXx: Return of Xander Cage | D. J. Caruso | Vin Diesel, Donnie Yen, Deepika Padukone, Kris Wu, Ruby Rose, Tony Jaa, Nina Dobrev, Toni Collette, Ariadna Gutiérrez, Hermione Corfield, Samuel L. Jackson | Caramoan (province of Camarines Sur, Philippines) | —N/a | United States | | |
| 2018 | Avengers: Infinity War | Anthony Russo, Joe Russo | Robert Downey Jr., Chris Hemsworth, Mark Ruffalo, Chris Evans | Banaue Rice Terraces (Ifugao) | Planet 0259-S | United States | End-credit scene where Thanos, the antagonist, retreats to an alien planet. The scene involved was subcontracted to Thailand-based Indochina Productions. | |

== See also ==
- List of Philippine co-produced films and television series
