= List of Beauty and the Beast (1987 TV series) episodes =

The following is a list of episodes of the American fantasy-drama series Beauty and the Beast. Starring Linda Hamilton, Ron Perlman, Roy Dotrice and Jo Anderson. Beauty and the Beast aired from September 25, 1987 to August 4, 1990 on CBS, for a total of 56 episodes.

== Series overview ==
Season	Episodes	Originally released	
Season	Episodes	First released	Last released
1	22	September 25, 1987	April 8, 1988
2	22	November 18, 1988	June 2, 1989
3	12	December 12, 1989	August 4, 1990

== Episodes ==
=== Season 1 (1987–88) ===
No. overall	No. in season	Title	Directed by	Written by	Original release date	Prod. code	Rating/share (households)
1	1	"Once Upon a Time in the City of New York"	Richard Franklin	Ron Koslow	September 25, 1987	101	13.5/26
When Catherine Chandler is abducted, beaten, and slashed by some men who mistook her for Carol Stabler, she is saved by Vincent (visibly human but has the appearance of a lion) who takes her to "The World Below" to recuperate, and the two form a strong friendship. After recuperating he sadly returns her above. Catherine then becomes an investigator for Manhattan's District Attorney office and learns to protect herself with a self-defense instructor. Eight months later Vincent and Catherine are happily reunited on Catherine's balcony. Vincent reveals that he feels all of Catherine's emotions and pain when she does. The very next day when investigating an illegal escort service run by Martin Belmont, her life ends up in danger until Vincent comes to her rescue. Guest stars: Ray Wise as Tom, Tony Mockus as Lieutenant Herman, Ava Lazar as Carol Stabler, Jason Allen as Kipper, Don Stark as Stocky Guy, Richard Fancy as Worker #1, Joel Hershman as Worker #2, Arlene Banas as Worker #3, Barbara Allyne Bennet as Receptionist
2	2	"Terrible Savior"	Alan Cooke	George R.R. Martin	October 2, 1987	102	14.0/26
Witness descriptions of a subway vigilante lead Catherine to believe that Vincent may be responsible. Guest stars: Dorian Harewood as Jason Walker, Tracee Lyles as Mrs. Darby, Iilana B'tiste as Suki, Lisa Albert as Pretty Girl, Michael Bacall as Runner, Hal Havins as Punk, Anthony Peck as Red
3	3	"Siege"	Paul Lynch	David E. Peckinpah	October 9, 1987	103	13.0/23
Vincent helps the residents of an apartment building defend themselves from thugs who want to chase them out so the apartment building can be torn down—unaware the mastermind behind the project is a developer trying to court Catherine. Guest stars: Robin Gammell as Lewis Arthur, Louis Giambalvo as Leo Mundy, Albert Hague as Micha Langer, Eda Reiss Merin as Sophie, Benny Baker as Herman, Ralph Manza as Old Man #1, Branscombe Richmond as Thug, Herta Ware as Sylvia, Richard Biggs as Reporter, Stuart Charno as Bennie, Pat Crawford Brown as Old Woman #1, Jeanette Miller as Old Woman #2, Tom Morga as Hired Hand
4	4	"No Way Down"	Thomas J. Wright	James Crocker	October 16, 1987	104	15.2/26
Upon being injured in an explosion, a half-blind Vincent is captured by a vicious street gang. Catherine with the help of her self-defense teacher Isaac are out to find Vincent. Guest stars: Mayim Bialik as Ellie, Jeffrey Combs as Python, Chris Nash as Chris, Merritt Butrick as Shake, Elizabeth Gorcey as Cozy, Gela Nash as Miss Patricia, Nancy Lenehan as Lucy, Tony Longo as Howie, Russ Marin as Red, Al Mancini as Cab Driver, Fran Montano as Grimes, Paul T. Murray as Tony, James Cavan as Wino, A. Michael Lerner as Cheeck, Jimmy Ortega as Dice, Bernie Pock as Sco
5	5	"Masques"	Alan Cooke	George R.R. Martin	October 30, 1987	105	13.3/23
While blending in on Halloween night, Vincent becomes the guardian of an Irish peace activist who is targeted for assassination. Guest stars: Caitlin O'Heaney as Briget O'Donnell, Eric Pierpoint as Donald, Aubrey Morris as Sean, Gerry Gibson as Michael, Ernie Lively as Cavanaugh, Cory Danziger as Kipper, Martin Garner as Moe, Kimberly McCullough as Abbey, Alex Powers as Brennan, Michael Bacall as David, Harry Moses as Jeff, Lindsay Parker as Little Girl, Frank Patton III as King Henry VIII
6	6	"The Beast Within"	Paul Lynch	Andrew Laskos	November 6, 1987	106	12.0/21
When a childhood friend becomes an enforcer for the mob, Vincent must choose his loyalty. Guest stars: Asher Brauner as Mitch Denton, John McLiam as Sam Denton, Mike Pniewski as Frank De Corsia, Michael Alldredge as Nat, Stan Kamber as Jack Sweeney, Jack McGee as McQuade, Monty Bane as Rado, Gisela Caldwell as Mrs. Sweeny, Cory Danziger as Kipper, Michael J. London as Shanks, Robert Factor as Garza, Glen Fagin as Tom, Lindsay Fisher as Laura, Tom Flynn as Nico, J. Bill Jones as Frazer
7	7	"Nor Iron Bars a Cage"	Thomas J. Wright	Teleplay by : Alex Gansa & Howard Gordon; Story by : Ron Perlman and Alex Gansa & Howard Gordon	November 13, 1987	107	13.1/23
After Vincent is accidentally caught on film. he is captured by two men. One of them, Dr. Edward Hughes, is a scientist who is desperate to learn the truth about Vincent. The other man, graduate student Jonathan Gould, believes Vincent is a freak of nature, and wants to reveal him to the public and become famous. However, Hughes finds out that Vincent is capable of speech and learns of the awful pain that Vincent is going through from being caged. Catherine finds the tranquilizer darts used when Hughes and Gould captured Vincent and tracks down Dr Hughes at his office. Guest stars: Michael Ensign as Dr. Edward Hughes, Christian Clemenson as Jonathan Gould, Darryl Hickman as Quint, Basil Hoffman as Trask, Cory Danziger as Kipper, Ellen Albertini Dow as Anna Lausch
8	8	"Song of Orpheus"	Peter Medak	Alex Gansa & Howard Gordon	November 20, 1987	108	12.2/21
When Father ventures to "The World Above" for the first time in decades, he is arrested for murder. Catherine and Vincent must dive into Father's past—where they learn of his true identity, Jacob Wells, a physician; his blacklisting during the McCarthy era; and, of his long-lost wife—to clear his name and reunite him with his now-dying wife. Guest stars: Diana Douglas as Margaret Chase, Robert Symonds as Alan Taft, Castulo Guerra as Detective, Paul Gleason as Henry Dutton, Gary Berner as Conner, Stan Lachow as Parker, Clive Rosengren as Lou
9	9	"Dark Spirit"	Thomas J. Wright	Robin Bernheim	November 27, 1987	109	12.7/22
While investigating a mysterious death, Catherine becomes a target for a mysterious voodoo cult, who makes her see and experience terrifying hallucinations. They then turn her against Vincent, making her believe he is responsible for the visions. Guest stars: Cliff De Young as Alexander Ross, Diana Barton as Lindsay Gates, Jessie Lawrence Ferguson as Roy Ocala, Obaka Adedunyo as Hector Ocala, Brett Hadley as William Coleman, David Sabin as Arthur, Gary Carlos Cervantes as Rafael Cruz
10	10	"A Children's Story"	Gabrielle Beaumont	B.F. Barnett	December 4, 1987	110	12.1/21
Catherine learns that a city's model, Ridley Foster Home, holds a dark secret: selling orphaned children to criminals who force them to steal. She saves one such orphan, Eric, and brings him to "The World Below" where he's welcomed by Father—who promises his missing sister Ellie a similar refuge—while Vincent helps Catherine find Ellie and end the child-selling racket. Guest stars: Richard Herd as Richard Barnes, Richard Portnow as Naj, Cory Danziger as Kipper, Kamie Harper as Ellie, Nike Doukas as Margaret, Joshua Rudoy as Eric, Elisabeth Harnois as Little Girl
11	11	"An Impossible Silence"	Christopher Leitch	Alex Gansa & Howard Gordon	December 18, 1987	111	12.4/22
Upon witnessing a shooting, deaf Laura Williams (Terrylene) must decide if she should leave the sanctuary of "The World Below" to free an innocent man. While Catherine is investigating the same case, Catherine is beaten up in her apartment by the men behind the murder. After receiving loving assurance from Vincent and Catherine, Laura bravely gives her statement to the police. Guest stars: Robert Pastorelli as Tony Perotta, Jason Bernard as Jack Davis, John M. Jackson as Laine Keller, Chris Mulkey as Danny Yates, Dana Gladstone as Detective Snyder, Glenn Plummer as Curtis Jackson, Kathleen Heller as Sharon Lewis, Michael Lewis as Costanza, Bill Pugin as Sign Language Interpreter, Sue Rihr as Maggie, Virginia Watson as Sergeant Walker
12	12	"Shades of Grey"	Thomas J. Wright	George R.R. Martin & David E. Peckinpah	January 8, 1988	112	15.8/25
The inhabitants of "The World Below" shun Mouse for his acts of thievery, until they need him and his mechanical and engineering intelligence to help rescue Father and Vincent following a cave-in. Mouse, in turn, needs Catherine's help...which sends her reluctantly to Elliot Burch for specialized construction equipment that may free Father and Vincent in time. Guest stars: Rutanya Alda as Mary, Cory Danziger as Kipper, Kamie Harper as Ellie, Joshua Rudoy as Eric
13	13	"China Moon"	Christopher Leitch	Cynthia Benjamin	January 15, 1988	113	14.7/25
Chinatown is the setting of a "Romeo and Juliet"-like story of a woman who is friends with Vincent and who has fallen in love with one man, but—through an arranged marriage—has become engaged to the son of a Triad leader. Guest stars: Rosalind Chao as Lin Wong, James Hong as Chiang Lo Yi, Keye Luke as Master, Jerry Tondo as Eddie, Victor Wong as Dr. Wong, Dennis Dun as Henry Pei, Peter Kwong as Peter Chiang, Jeff Imada as Bruce, Phil Chong as Kuo, Leigh C. Kim as Tommy, James Lew as Tong #3
14	14	"The Alchemist"	Thomas J. Wright	Teleplay by : Alex Gansa & Howard Gordon; Story by : Richard Setlowe	January 22, 1988	114	13.9/24
Catherine believes a deadly new hallucinatory drug on the street is supplied by someone from "The World Below." Catherine, Vincent, and Father discover Father's former friend Paracelsus—who originally helped him build "The World Below"—is behind this. Guest stars: Joey Aresco as Jimmy Morero, Dana Gladstone as Claude, John Amos as Farrell, Jeffrey Nordling as Tyler, Katherine Heard as Mary, Laura Harring as Carmen, Albie Selznick as Zeke, Zachary Rosencrantz as Zach, Paul Savage as Jimmy Flannery
15	15	"Temptation"	Gus Trikonis	David E. Peckinpah	February 5, 1988	115	13.9/23
Joe is spearheading the investigation of a major firm, so the firm's attorney begins using dirty tactics to derail Joe, and Catherine discovers that Joe's new girlfriend is a vital part of the conspiracy. Meanwhile, Vincent travels to a deep chamber to find a gift for Catherine, in celebration of the one-year anniversary of their first meeting. Guest stars: Isabella Hofmann as Erika Salven, Herb Edelman as Harold Levinson, Mark Schubb as Ted, Milo O'Shea as Evan Brannigan, Bob Hoy as Cassut, Carl Ciarfalio as Hopkins, John Petlock as Dr. Sanderle, Jason Ross as Franklin
16	16	"Promises of Someday"	Thomas J. Wright	George R.R. Martin	February 12, 1988	116	13.9/23
A new assistant D.A. (whose competence Catherine questions) turns out to be Vincent's long-lost childhood friend from "The World Below", Devin, whose vagabond way of life—similar to Tony Curtis's character in The Great Impostor—began after a falling-out with Father over his endangering Vincent aboard a park carousel. The uneasy reunion between Vincent and Devin leads to the revelation of one of Father's long-kept secrets (he's Devin's biological father), but ends in their reconciliation and with Devin now knowing he has a home to return to. Guest stars: John Franklin as Young Vincent, Andrew Held as Young Devin, Max Battimo as Young Mitch, Holly Sampson as Tomboy
17	17	"Down to a Sunless Sea"	Christopher Leitch	Don Ballck	February 19, 1988	117	15.0/24
Vincent has foreboding dreams when Catherine's former fiancé Steven Bass returns to her life, and with good reason: Catherine is barely aware Steven—whose parents are now dead and who's dying of brain disease, but whose becalmed manner at first belies that he's still a control freak—is obsessed with making her the wife she doesn't want to be to him, and goes to troubling extremes to make it happen. Guest stars: Jim Metzler as Steven Bass, Marla Adams as Helen Thompson, Robert Cornthwaite as Morrison, Christine Jansen as Marcy O'Neill, Cory Danziger as Kipper, Raymond Cruz as Hal, Eric Poppick as Mercer, Tomas Trujillo as Tony
18	18	"Fever"	Thomas J. Wright	Michael Cassutt & Mark Cassutt	February 26, 1988	118	13.1/22
A necklace Mouse gives Catherine as a gift turns out to be made of antique gold, found in a buried ship Mouse discovered by accident deep in "The World Below." When he shows Winslow and stone-worker Cullen, it leads to an unheard-of spell of raw greed among their fellow tunnel dwellers, especially when Cullen tries to claim the ship's treasure as his own for sale, until Catherine, Vincent, and Father find a surprising resolution. Guest stars: David Clennon as Cullen, Stan Ivar as Jonathan Thorpe, Alan Blumenfeld as Saul, Raye Birk as Edmonton, Cory Danziger as Kipper, Kay E. Kuter as Alain Viso, George R.R. Martin as Restaurant Patron
19	19	"Everything is Everything"	Victor Lobl	Virginia Aldridge	March 4, 1988	119	12.8/22
Vincent and Catherine become involved with a gypsy boy who's been banished from his tribe because of a crime his father was supposed to have committed and who claims that his father was actually innocent. Guest stars: Robert Pastorelli as Vick Ramos, Josh Blake as Tony Ramos, Will Kuluva as Grandfather Milo, Jennifer Balgobin as Maria, Renata Vanni as Eva, Cory Danziger as Kipper, Paul Greco as Joe
20	20	"To Reign in Hell"	Christopher Leitch	Alex Gansa & Howard Gordon	March 18, 1988	120	11.8/21
Catherine receives an unexpected visitor on her balcony: Paracelsus's minion Erlik, who captures Catherine in a plot to lure Vincent to the lower parts of "The World Below" and kill him so that Paracelsus can overthrow Father and take over "The World Below". Despite knowing what Paracelsus would do, Vincent goes to rescue her with the help of Pascal, Winslow, and Jamie. Guest stars: Big John Studd as Erlik, Cory Danziger as Kipper, Severn Darden as Waterman
21	21	"Ozymandias"	Frank Beascoechea	George R.R. Martin	April 1, 1988	121	11.8/22
Elliot Burch's great construction project "Burch Tower" threatens the existence of "The World Below", and Catherine agrees to marry him if he will halt construction. Guest stars: Julie Carmen as Luz Corrales, Linda Porter as Elizabeth, Rutanya Alda as Sarah, Betsy Brantley as Nancy Tucker, Sue Giosa as Ronni, Gerald Castillo as Simons, Carl Strano as Roth
22	22	"A Happy Life"	Victor Lobl	Ron Koslow	April 8, 1988	122	12.7/23
Depressed on the anniversary of her mother's death, Catherine struggles emotionally between her relationship with Vincent and her working life, enough so that Vincent tries to end their relationship. But when she retreats to a friend's home out of town, Catherine and Vincent each realize their love is rare, true, and worth their struggles, and Catherine returns to New York running into Vincent's arms. Guest stars: Betsy Brantley as Nancy Tucker, Sam Freed as Dr. Grafton, Richard Young as Buddy, W.K. Stratton as The Patrolman, Mimi Craven as Rebecca, Annette McCarthy as Jenny, Dianne Turley Travis as Kay, Zachary Benjamin as Jeremy, Kelly Kehoe as Young Cathy, Patrick Pankhurst as Paul, Marina Suriano as Jill, Caryn West as Catherine's Mother

=== Season 2 (1988–89) ===
No. overall	No. in season	Title	Directed by	Written by	Original release date	U.S. viewers (millions)	Rating/share (households)
23	1	"Chamber Music"	Victor Lobl	Ron Koslow	November 18, 1988	17.7	11.6/20
In this homage to classical music, Vincent – after enjoying a park performance of Schubert's Unfinished Symphony joyously with Catherine – discovers Rollie, a former resident of "The World Below", once a gifted pianist who played the classics stunningly by ear, but now a drug addict struggling to survive in the city. Through a series of flashbacks, we learn Rollie feels responsible for the death of a helper who taught him to read music. In the end, he refuses to accept the love and forgiveness waiting Below, though Vincent assures him no one blames him for her death. Guest stars: Janet MacLachlan as Miss Kendrick, Theodore Bikel as Eli, Terrance Ellis as Rolley, Garland Spencer as Young Rolley, Shavar Ross as Anthony, Dion Basco as Paco
24	2	"Remember Love"	Victor Lobl	Virginia Aldridge	November 25, 1988	17.1	11.1/20
Catherine longs for Vincent to escort her to a secret hidden place that she had as a child in Connecticut. Yet Vincent realizes that there is too much danger if he were to venture above. Vincent then begins having visions of an angel who takes him on a journey of what life would have been like if he had never existed with one of them having involved Paracelsus successfully taking over "The World Below." He begins to believe that the changed world is all real. But he realizes it was all a dream when he wakes up in his bed and sees Catherine smiling down at him.
25	3	"Ashes, Ashes"	Gus Trikonis	Teleplay by : Durrell Royce Crays; Story by : Durrell Royce Crays & Roy Dotrice	December 2, 1988	16.3	11.4/20
Vincent rescues a man named Dimitri Benko from drowning and brings him to "The World Below" to recuperate. Little does anyone know, Dimitri is carrying the pneumonic plague which soon becomes an epidemic amongst the residents of the tunnels and begins taking lives. Meanwhile, Catherine discovers that Dr. Peter Alcroft is an old friend of Father when it comes to helping the infected. Guest stars: Adrian Paul as Dimitri Benko, Kamie Harper as Ellie, Joshua Rudoy as Eric, Zachary Rosencrantz as Zach, Carolyn Finney as Rita Escobar
26	4	"Dead of Winter"	Victor Lobl	George R.R. Martin	December 9, 1988	13.7	9.1/16
When "The World Below" is planning an annual winter event called Winterfest with Catherine and the other "Helpers," Paracelsus plans to crash the party. Catherine and Vincent suspect that someone at the party is actually Paracelsus in disguise and must find out who it is. Guest stars: Tony Steedman as Sebastian, Anne Haney as Tamara, Marcie Leeds as Samantha, Clive Rosengren as Lou
27	5	"God Bless the Child"	Gus Trikonis	Alex Gansa & Howard Gordon	December 16, 1988	16.8	11.8/21
Catherine convinces Vincent and Father to welcome pregnant former prostitute Lena to the "World Below" where she can have her baby and be part of the community, but a crush on Vincent turns to more for Lena after her baby is born. After running away when Vincent rejects her advances gently but firmly, Lena is found by Catherine, who convinces her to return to the tunnels, where she names her baby after Catherine. Guest stars: Katy Boyer as Lena, Willard E. Pugh as Maurice, Cory Danziger as Kipper, Marcie Leeds as Samantha, Zachary Rosencrantz as Zach
28	6	"Sticks and Stones"	Bruce Malmuth	Alex Gansa & Howard Gordon	January 6, 1989	17.6	12.1/19
Deaf Laura Williams (Terrylene Sacchetti) now lives in surface New York but backs away as a helper for "The World Below" when she falls in with a gang of young, angry deaf people whose leader, Lincoln, is investigated for a security guard's murder. Laura's boyfriend in the gang, Jerry, is an undercover police officer who reveals his secret to her, prompting her to run away. She returns to discover Jerry's cover blown and the gang sentences him to a punishment "sticks and stones." He is rescued by Catherine and the police who are searching for him, as well as Vincent who is summoned by one of the helpers. Guest star: Tim Russ as Lt. Eric Parker, Ron Marquette as Jerry, Charles Bouvier as Sgt. Greg McQueeney, Warren Munson as Willis, William C. Byrd as Miguel, Rico Barlow as Rico, Vae as Blanca, Sarah Malmeth as Maria
29	7	"A Fair and Perfect Knight"	Gus Trikonis	P.K. Simonds	January 13, 1989	15.7	11.0/19
Catherine befriends and takes in young Michael Richmond, who's lived in "The World Below" since childhood but now begins college in the city, but the revelation of his real parentage and a crush on Catherine drive him to second thoughts until Catherine and Vincent convince him to try again. Guest stars: Bill Calvert as Michael Richmond, Marcie Leeds as Samantha, Laurel Moglen as Brooke, Cyd Strittmatter as Beth, John Frederick Jones as Michael's Father, Zachary Rosencrantz as Zach, Riad Galayini as Tina
30	8	"Labyrinths"	Daniel Attias	Teleplay by : Virginia Aldridge; Story by : Alex Gansa & Howard Gordon	January 20, 1989	15.4	10.3/17
A teenage boy who lives in Catherine's apartment building discovers "The World Below" by mistake while seeking refuge from his divorced parents' testy joint custody arrangement and following unsuspecting Catherine into the tunnels. The tunnel dwellers convince him to keep their secret while offering him a refuge if he wants it. Guest stars: Jonathan Ward as Brian, Daniel Benzali as Edward, Laurel Moglen as Brooke, Henry G. Sanders as Rescue Captain, Robert Cornthwaite as Old Man, Jeff Maynard as Stevie, Justin Dana as Derek
31	9	"Brothers"	Bethany Rooney	George R.R. Martin	February 3, 1989	16.7	11.3/18
Devin Wells returns to "The World Below" with Charles, a deformed man with Proteus syndrome who seeks sanctuary from his abusive brother Eddie while escaping from a carnival where he's billed "The Dragon Man." Vincent befriends Charles but the deformed man's fear and awkwardness lead to complications until Devin agrees to care for Charles at a mountain retreat. Guest stars: Don Stark as Eddie, Kevin Scannell as Charles, Remy Ryan as Lauren, Robert Britton as Bernie
32	10	"A Gentle Rain"	Gus Trikonis	Linda Campanelli & M.M. Shelly Moore	February 17, 1989	14.2	9.8/16
A resident of "The World Below" named Kanin—about to celebrate his first wedding anniversary below—is recognised by a woman in "The World Above" as the driver who killed her small son in an accident sixteen years ago, the real reason Kanin retreated to the tunnels. Catherine discovers his warrant by accident and doesn't want to force Kanin to leave his family, but Vincent convinces him to face his responsibility and give closure to the still-grieving woman. Guest stars: Piper Laurie as Mrs. Davis, Elayne Heilveil as Olivia, Scott Jaeck as Kanin, Chris Paul Davis as John
33	11	"The Outsiders"	Thomas J. Wright	Teleplay by : Michael Berlin & Eric Estrin; Story by : Alex Gansa, Howard Gordon & P.K. Simonds	February 24, 1989	16.3	11.1/18
When a group of homeless people find their way into "The World Below," Father decides to welcome them. Vincent is wary about this as it seems that the homeless people are violent and disturbed. Guest stars: Anthony James as Micah, Jonathan Perpich as Randolph, Zachary Rosencrantz as Zach, Dennis Phun as Long, Scott Tsurutani as Edward, Dan Bell as Dak, Chance Michael Corbitt as Zeke, Gregory J. Barnett as Dick, Justin DeRosa as Jared, Stephanie Epper as Lizzie, Tony Epper as Tranck, Matt Johnston as Hoby, Janet Lee Orcutt as Jez, Danny Weselis as Derek
34	12	"Orphans"	Victor Lobl	Alex Gansa & Howard Gordon	March 6, 1989	11.2	8.8/14
When Catherine's father dies of a stroke, she retreats to "The World Below" to grieve. She asks Vincent to let her stay with him and not return to "The World Above" and though he agrees, he knows that eventually she will need to go back. One night she is visited by her father's spirit in a dream and she comes to terms with losing him, which gives her the strength to return to her world. Guest stars: Fredric Arnold as Jay Coolidge, Douglas Roberts as Mark Coolidge, Kate Williamson as Marilyn Campbell, Abraham Alvarez as Dr. Cherian, Carolyn Finney as Rita Escobar, Dion Basco as Paco In 2009, TV Guide ranked this episode No. 89 on its list of the 100 Greatest Episodes.
35	13	"Arabesque"	Thomas J. Wright	Virginia Aldridge	March 13, 1989	13.6	10.3/18
Former "World Below" resident Lisa Campbell – now a world-famous ballerina — returns to the tunnels for refuge, desperate not to testify against her controlling and arms-running boyfriend. Her return unnerves Vincent—who loved her when they were teenagers, but who injured her once during an embrace, a major reason he fears physical intimacy with Catherine. But Catherine consoles Vincent and convinces Lisa to face the authorities and do what she can to put her boyfriend away for his crimes. Guest stars: Elyssa Davalos as Lisa Campbell, Mark Neal as Young Vincent, Kelli Williams as Young Lisa, Christopher Neame as Collin Hemmings, Preston Hanson as Frank, Marguerite Hickey as Beth, Michelle Costello as Jill, Marcie Leeds as Samantha, Linda Hoy as Marie
36	14	"When the Blue Bird Sings"	Victor Lobl	Teleplay by : Robert John Guttke & George R.R. Martin; Story by : Robert John Guttke	March 31, 1989	15.3	10.8/19
An eccentric young artist calling himself Kristopher keeps appearing in Catherine's life after meeting her in a bookstore—including near a tunnel entrance where he sees Vincent. Believing he faked his own death to advance his previously obscure works, Catherine tracks his paintings to a warehouse where Vincent joins her, but Kristopher vanishes after showing them the rest of his works. After Catherine arranges a successful show at a gallery, the gallery owner presents her with a wrapped painting that has her name on it—an oil painting Kristopher did of her and Vincent. When Vincent notices the paint completely dry, which takes years for oil paints, the air of mystery deepens. Guest stars: Franc Luz as Kristopher, Severn Darden as Mr. Smythe, Carolyn Finney as Rita Escobar
37	15	"The Watcher"	Victor Lobl	Linda Campanelli & M.M. Shelly Moore	April 7, 1989	15.2	10.7/20
On the night of their second anniversary, Catherine and Vincent are unnerved to think a stalker claims to have seen Vincent, which he reiterates in a frightening phone call to Catherine. Determined to learn his identify, but afraid to involve the police to protect Vincent, Catherine is soon kidnapped by the stalker while Vincent and Joe separately try to find her. She's left unconscious in the trunk of his car in a lake, until Vincent rescues her and dispatches the stalker before she can die. Guest stars: David Neidorf as The Watcher, John Michael Bolger as Det. Greg Hughs, Joseph Carberry as Det. Greene, Carolyn Finney as Rita Escobar
38	16	"A Distant Shore"	Michael Switzer	Marie Therese Squerciatti	April 14, 1989	14.9	10.5/20
Catherine must travel to California as part of an investigation for the D.A.'s office in New York. She and Vincent discover just how strong their bond is when Vincent is able to warn her telepathically of an impending attack while she is trying to bring a witness back to New York with her. Guest stars: Andrew Bloch as Mel Rae, Debra Engle as Gina Barrett, Sal Jenco as Richie, Carolyn Finney as Rita Escobar, Tina Andrews as Booth Woman, Alan Berger as Danny
39	17	"Trial"	Victor Lobl	Teleplay by : P.K. Simonds; Story by : Alex Gansa & Howard Gordon	April 21, 1989	12.7	9.3/19
Catherine and Joe have been working on a case involving a high-power Wall Street celebrity whose child abuse resulted in the death of his son. Catherine is named the prosecutor in the case and she soon must deal with the challenge of trying to get the child's mother to testify against her husband. Guest stars: Jayne Atkinson as Molly Nolan, Michael Holden as Officer Henry Ohlberg, Amy Lynne as Amy Nolan, Scott Marlowe as Richard Nolan, Rosemary Dunsmore as Virginia Sheets, Fritz Bronner as Rob Rand, Byron Morrow as Judge Swenson, Dale Swann as Peter Rundler
40	18	"A Kingdom by the Sea"	Gus Trikonis	George R.R. Martin	April 28, 1989	13.2	9.4/18
The CIA pushes Catherine and Joe off investigating the murder of an old man who proves to be the father of Elliot Burch—whose shady dealings in Central America have him in danger from a country's death squad, leading Catherine to put her own life on the line to help him. Guest stars: R.G. Armstrong as Stanley Kazmarek, Ken Foree as Morley, Dean Norris as Biggs, Tom Ryan as Bryant, Dominic Hoffman as Resident, John Michael Bolger as Det. Greg Hughs, Carl Crudup as Rivera, Scott Wells as Tyler, Dave Cadiente as Ramon, Thomas Rosales Jr. as Carlos
41	19	"The Hollow Men"	Victor Lobl	Teleplay by : P.K. Simonds; Story by : Andrew Laskos & P.K. Simonds	May 5, 1989	15.6	11.0/21
Two rich kids have been targeting and murdering prostitutes for fun. Late one night, Vincent witnesses their latest murder and is unable to stop them. Catherine soon puts together a case against them but has a hard time putting them away. Meanwhile, Vincent has set on his own to put an end to their madness. Guest stars: Brian Bloom as Cameron Benson, Tom Bresnahan as Dale Mercer, François Giroday as Warren Brancton, Willard E. Pugh as Maurice, Samantha Kaye as Tracy Toffe, John Diehl as Vernon Toulane, John Michael Bolger as Det. Greg Hughs, Apollo Dukakis as Judge Hiagnor, Hal England as Mr. Benson, Barbara Lord as Mrs. Benson, John Garwood as Mr. Hallowell, Fritz Bronner as Office Worker, Cindy Adkins as Karen Alexander, Rhonda Aldrich as Phoebe, Pamella D'Pella as Woman, Amanda Goodwin as Wendy
42	20	"What Rough Beast"	Michael Switzer	Teleplay by : Alex Gansa & Howard Gordon; Story by : Alex Gansa, Howard Gordon & George R.R. Martin	May 12, 1989	14.4	9.9/20
Catherine is attacked by two men in the park who are disguised as police officers. Vincent comes to her rescue only for it to be a set-up caused by a shadowy figure who has hired an investigative reporter named Bernie Spirko to expose Vincent's existence to the public at large. Guest stars: Dan Shor as Bernie Spirko, Sam Vlahos as Sgt. Jesse Martinez, Jim Metzler as Steven Bass, Gary Hudson as Gus, Joseph Whipp as Bill Edwards, Don Maxwell as Roger
43	21	"Ceremony of Innocence"	Gus Trikonis	Teleplay by : George R.R. Martin; Story by : Alex Gansa, Howard Gordon & George R.R. Martin	May 19, 1989	12.8	9.4/19
Following Spirko's death, Elliot Burch and Catherine set out to find the man who hired his killer—unaware the killer is Paracelsus, who stabbed Spirko to death, setting in motion the next stage of his plan to take over "The World Below." Disguised as Father—whom he left bound and hidden in a rented penthouse—Paracelsus lies to Vincent about his birth which brings Vincent to the verge of madness in a final confrontation. Guest star: Richard Roundtree as Cleon Manning
44	22	"The Rest Is Silence..."	Victor Lobl	Teleplay by : Ron Koslow; Story by : David Carren & J. Larry Carroll	June 2, 1989	11.3	8.1/18
Following the death of Paracelsus, and Father's revelation of the truth about his abandonment and adoption, Vincent comes to terms that the beast within him is causing him to lose control until Catherine daringly joins him to comfort him through it. Guest stars: Marcie Leeds as Samantha, Elayne Heilveil as Olivia, Zachary Rosencrantz as Zach, John Mueller as Sentry, Jack Forbes as Marc

=== Season 3 (1989–90) ===
No. overall	No. in season	Title	Directed by	Written by	Original release date	U.S. viewers (millions)
45	1	"Though Lovers Be Lost..."	Victor Lobl	Alex Gansa, Howard Gordon & Ron Koslow	December 12, 1989	20.1
46	2	"Though Lovers Be Lost..."	Victor Lobl	Alex Gansa, Howard Gordon & Ron Koslow	December 12, 1989	20.1
After recovering from his violent madness, Vincent finds himself unable to sense when Catherine is in danger. When an explosion lands Joe in the hospital, Catherine learns that she is pregnant and ends up captured by a crime syndicate led by a shadowy figure during her investigation. Six months later, Vincent, Joe, and Elliot each continue searching for Catherine. D.A. John Moreno suspends Joe suspiciously, leaving Joe to continue on his own. As Catherine's pregnancy begins its final phase, Vincent detects his child's presence, which leads him to the dying Catherine—injected with a fatal drug dose—and a skyscraper roof where the crime syndicate's leader Gabriel escapes by helicopter with Vincent's newborn son. Catherine and Vincent share a heartbreaking goodbye on the roof as she dies in his arms. Guest stars: Mitchell Laurance as Patrick Hanlon, Warren Frost as Paul Malloy, Marcie Leeds as Samantha, Kenneth Kimmins as Doctor, Richard Roundtree as Cleon Manning, Gustav Vintas as Harper, Henry K. Bal as Brown, James Harper as Dr. Ancheta, Clement von Franckenstein as Auctioneer, Zachary Rosencrantz as Zach, Tiiu Leek as Leslie Cole
47	3	"Walk Slowly"	Gus Trikonis	Linda Campanelli & M.M. Shelly Moore	December 13, 1989	17.0
Following Catherine's murder, Vincent takes her body back to her apartment and leaves her on her bed. Joe begins an investigation into finding Catherine's murderer and hires reluctant police investigator Diana Bennett to help him. Diana encounters Elliot and members of "The World Below" at Catherine's funeral before beginning to piece together Catherine's secretive romance with Vincent. After the funeral, Vincent says a last private goodbye next to her grave. Guest stars: Lewis Smith as Mark, Mike Pniewski as Nick, Marcie Leeds as Samantha, Bill Calvert as Michael, Terrylene as Laura Williams, Elayne Heilveil as Olivia, Michael O'Guinne as Mitch, Zachary Rosencrantz as Zach, John H. Evans as Pruitt, Oz Tortora as Frank Wyman, Lew Horn as Dr. Marks, Jace Kent as Steve
48	4	"Nevermore"	Victor Lobl	P.K. Simonds	December 20, 1989	15.5
Vincent begins his quest to find his captive son and makes his first move by revealing himself to Elliot. Meanwhile, Diana is more immersed in Catherine's life and soon discovers the entrance into the Tunnel World in the basement of Catherine's apartment building. Elliot soon discovers Moreno's role in Catherine's death. Guest stars: Stanley Kamel as George Walker, M. Scott Wilkinson as Burton Fitch, Richard Roundtree as Cleon Manning, Zachary Rosencrantz as Zach, Mike Jolly as Pierson, Patrick St. Esprit as Arvin Cates
49	5	"Snow"	Gus Trikonis	George R.R. Martin	December 27, 1989	14.1
Vincent is haunted by dreams of heavily-snowing winter, and no wonder: Gabriel sends an assassin named Snow to eliminate him, leading him to lead Snow away from the "World Below" inhabitants when Snow finds the tunnels. Meanwhile, Joe has become acting district attorney in the wake of Moreno's exposure and murder and is free to continue his own investigation. Snow dies in a cave-in in the deepest tunnel. Guest stars: Lance Henriksen as Snow, Lewis Smith as Mark, Zachary Rosencrantz as Zach, Iggie Wolfington as Librarian, Laurel Moglen as Brooke, Randy Kaplan as Stephen, Karen Eliot as Eve
50	6	"Beggar's Comet"	Victor Lobl	George R.R. Martin	January 3, 1990	13.0
Vincent plans to leave "The World Below" to keep its inhabitants from being targeted by Gabriel's men. Elliot befriends a street saxophonist who gives him information to help track Gabriel. Following the death of Snow, Gabriel plans to have Vincent killed and approaches Elliot with an offer to betray Vincent. Next to a boat on a dock, Elliot instead warns Vincent away. Guest stars: Lewis Smith as Mark, Ben Piazza as Richards, John Lehne as Jonathan Pope, John Michael Bolger as Det. Greg Hughs, Stanley Kamel as George Walker, Nick LaTour as Clarence, Joe Lando as One of Gabriel's Thugs, Mike Jolly as Pierson, Laurel Moglen as Brooke
51	7	"A Time to Heal"	Gus Trikonis	Alex Gansa & Howard Gordon	January 10, 1990	14.5
Following the boat explosion, Diana finds a wounded Vincent at Catherine's grave and takes him back to her apartment to heal. Father comes to the surface and visits Joe to know if Vincent had perished in the boat explosion, but learns it was Elliot who was killed trying to protect Vincent. Diana removes all news items and written evidence involving Vincent's rescues of Catherine in danger from her working wall board. Guest stars: Lewis Smith as Mark, Daniel Faraldo as Jorge, Laurel Moglen as Brooke
52	8	"The Chimes at Midnight"	Ron Perlman	Linda Campanelli & M.M. Shelly Moore	January 17, 1990	13.5
When Vincent entrusts Snow's ring to Diana, she becomes a target for Gabriel's men and ends up captured. Vincent surrenders himself to Gabriel when he hears that his son is terminally ill. Guest stars: Kenneth Kimmins as Doctor, John Lehne as Jonathan Pope, Steven Gilborn as Martin, Tony Plana as Louis Horner, Leonard R. Garner Jr. as Carlo, Tom Donaldson as Nash, Steve Mittleman as Sonny, June Kyoko Lu as Tenko
53	9	"Invictus"	Gus Trikonis	George R.R. Martin	January 24, 1990	14.0
With Vincent a prisoner of Gabriel, he witnesses his son making a miraculous recovery. Diana can't return to her apartment as it's under surveillance by Gabriel's men. Upon learning of Vincent's capture, Father and the other inhabitants of "The World Below" bring Diana to "The World Below" where she gives them the description of the floor tile in Gabriel's house. In front of a horrified Vincent, Gabriel kills the doctor who treated the baby and fatally injected Catherine. Vincent finally escapes the electrified cage as Diana arrives. After Vincent leaves to care for his son, Diana shoots Gabriel dead with Catherine's gun. During a baby-naming ceremony, Vincent names the baby Jacob after Father—and we see Catherine's face looking down with a smile over Vincent's shoulder. Guest stars: Kenneth Kimmins as Doctor, John Lehne as Jonathan Pope, John Michael Bolger as Det. Greg Hughs, Tony Maggio as Sammy, Dayton Callie as Hitman, June Kyoko Lu as Tenko, Alex Datcher as Andrea
54	10	"In the Forests of the Night"	Victor Lobl	P.K. Simonds	July 21, 1990	7.3
Rolley is shot while trying to rob a liquor store and takes refuge in the tunnels. This brings his heroin addiction to the forefront and Vincent vows to do his best to help Rolley which leads to a fiery encounter at a drug house that unknown to Vincent is run by Gabriel. Guest stars: Tony Plana as Louis Horner, Suzie Plakson as Susan, Miguel Sandoval as Jerry, Tony Colitti as Tony, Terrance Ellis as Rolley, Joseph Romeo as Dr. Booker, Keeley Gallagher as Alexandra Note: The events of this episode actually take place before the events seen in "The Chimes at Midnight."
55	11	"The Reckoning"	Kenneth R. Koch	Alex Gansa & Howard Gordon	July 28, 1990	6.2
In the aftermath of Gabriel's death, Vincent introduces Diana to the inhabitants of "The World Below." When Father receives a visit from his old flame Jessica Webb, it prompts Mary (Ellen Geer) to confess to Vincent that she's been in love with Father a very long time. Diana investigates the strange murders of ex-inhabitants turned helpers of "The World Below"—all of whose faces are covered in blue ash. Guest stars: Fionnula Flanagan as Jessica Webb, David Graf as Gregory Coyle, John Pleshette as Jimmy Faber, Jeff Corey as Winston Burke, Terrylene as Laura Williams, Elayne Heilveil as Olivia, Patrick Y. Malone as Darryl, Vachik Mangassarian as Lewis Windham, Alex Datcher as Andrea, Patricia Place as Deborah White, Susan Angelo as Susan
56	12	"Legacies"	Gus Trikonis	Teleplay by : P.K. Simonds; Story by : Alex Gansa & Howard Gordon	August 4, 1990	6.2
Father says a painful goodbye to Jessica, who can't let herself return to "The World Below" while Father knows he must return. He returns to the tunnels and discovers former inhabitant Gregory Coyle has committed the murders—seeking revenge for the death of his father by cave-in 20 years ago. Diana makes it her mission to catch Gregory before he can kill again but clashes with an old-school detective (John Pleshette), who refuses to believe her description of Gregory's pattern. Gregory buries Father alive in a little-used tunnel but lets himself fall to his own death despite Diana and Vincent's rescue attempt. The series concludes with Diana and Vincent in his chamber, and Diana holding Vincent's baby son next to him. Guest stars: Fionnula Flanagan as Jessica Webb, David Graf as Gregory Coyle, Terrylene as Laura Williams, Teddy Wilson as Raymond Ensign, Lauren White as Dr. Nyhart, Laurel Moglen as Brooke, Delane Vaughn as Young Raymond Ensign, Matthew Kenemore as Young Gregory Coyle
