= Closer to Home (film) =

1995 film by Joseph Nobile

Closer to Home: At What Price Family?
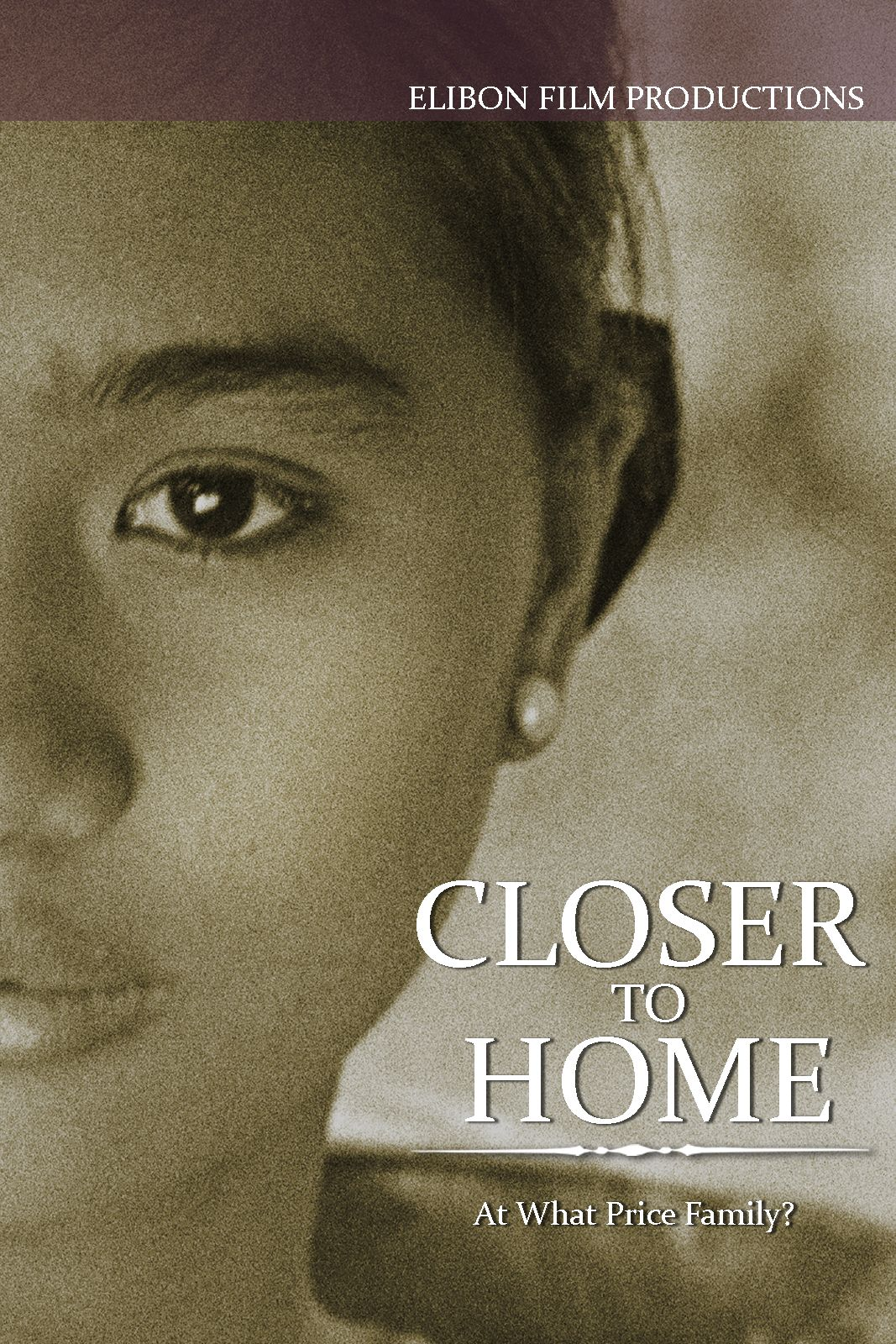
- Theatrical release poster
- Directed by: Joseph Nobile
- Screenplay by: Joseph Nobile; Ruben Arthur Nicdao
- Produced by: Steven Nobile; Joseph Nobile
- Starring: Madeline Ortaliz; John Michael Bolger
- Cinematography: Irek Hartowicz
- Edited by: Janice Keuhnelian; James Y. Kwei
- Music by: Ryan Cayabyab
- Production company: Elibon Film Productions
- Distributed by: Golden Dragon International Cinema
- Release date: 30 August 1995 (Canada)
- Running time: 125 minutes
- Country: United States
- Language: English/Tagalog

Closer to Home, also known by the working title Looking for America, is a 1995 American independent drama film directed by Joseph Nobile. It was screened in thirty international film festivals including the 41st Valladolid International Film Festival and the 31st Karlovy Vary International Film Festival.

== Plot summary ==
The film follows the story of Dalisay, a young woman from rural Philippines whose family faces mounting debt and the urgent need to fund her sister Luningning's heart surgery. Seeing no other option, she agrees to an arranged marriage with Dean, a disillusioned American former merchant marine, through a marriage broker — hoping the union will secure her family's financial survival. Unable to tell her parents the truth, she claims she has found work as a nanny in the United States, leaving them to borrow from a local loan shark to cover her visa costs.

Arriving in New York City, Dalisay approaches her new life with quiet determination. Dean, seeking his own form of escape from a fractured family and unresolved disputes over inherited property, initially receives her warmly — offering gifts and encouraging her to focus on their home life rather than finding work. Their early days together suggest a tentative, fragile connection built on shared vulnerability rather than affection.

As their marriage settles into routine, deep cultural differences emerge and sharpen. Dean's unresolved family conflicts increasingly intrude on their domestic life, while Dalisay bears the hidden weight of her family's continued financial demands from home. The gap between what each hoped marriage would provide — stability for her, redemption for him — widens steadily. Dalisay's initial hope gives way to disillusionment with the realities of immigrant life in America, while Dean's aspirations for a fresh start dissolve into regret, leaving both characters caught between the lives they left behind and the life they cannot quite build together.

== Production ==
At the time of its production, Closer to Home was among the very earliest self-financed American independent features of the indie era conceived and produced as an American film to shoot substantively outside the United States — virtually without precedent within the movement — at a moment when the dominant tendency of American independent cinema was precisely the opposite: inward, domestic, local.

The film tells the story of Dalisay — "her name means 'pure' in Tagalog," a detail spoken aloud in the film's opening scene, when she is introduced to her potential husband at a mail-order bride agency in New York City. The word lands in that context with an irony the film never lets go of. Dalisay is not a supporting character or a backdrop. She is the moral centre of the film — a woman navigating impossible choices with intelligence and dignity. In 1995, that was not a story American cinema was accustomed to telling, or American audiences accustomed to seeing, with an Asian woman at its heart. That it nearly slipped from the critical record may say more about that moment than about the film itself.

== Cast ==
- Madeline Ortaliz as Dalisay Dimagiba
- John Michael Bolger as Dean Warren
- Elizabeth Bracco as Alma, Nick's Wife
- Joonee Gamboa as Magno Dimagiba, Dalisay's Father
- Connie Chua as Lucing Dimagiba, Dalisay's Mother
- Vic Diaz as Gruta, the Nightclub Owner
- Ray Ventura as Lacaba, the Loan Shark
- Tony Mabesa as Senor De Villa, the Plantation Owner
- Jane Gabbert as Jan Warren, Dean's Sister
- Ralph Buckley as Nick, Dean's Cousin
- James Lorinz as the Garage Mechanic
- Angie Castrence as Tess, Dalisay's Cousin
- Ching Valdes-Aran as Ms. Amador, the Marriage Broker
- Barbara Blackburn as the Flirtatious Bar Woman
- Edward Lane as Uncle Ralph, Dean's Uncle
- Lou Veloso as Nanding, Magno's Brother
- Percy Estrella as Imelda, Dalisay's Cousin
- Arthur J. Nascarella as the Bartender

== Gallery ==
Scenes from the film

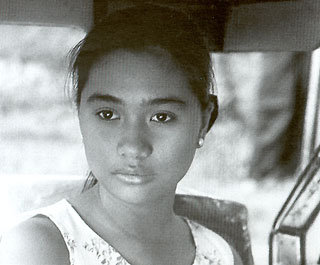
Dalisay in the province

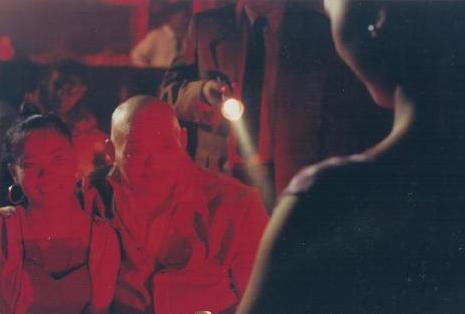
Looking for a way out

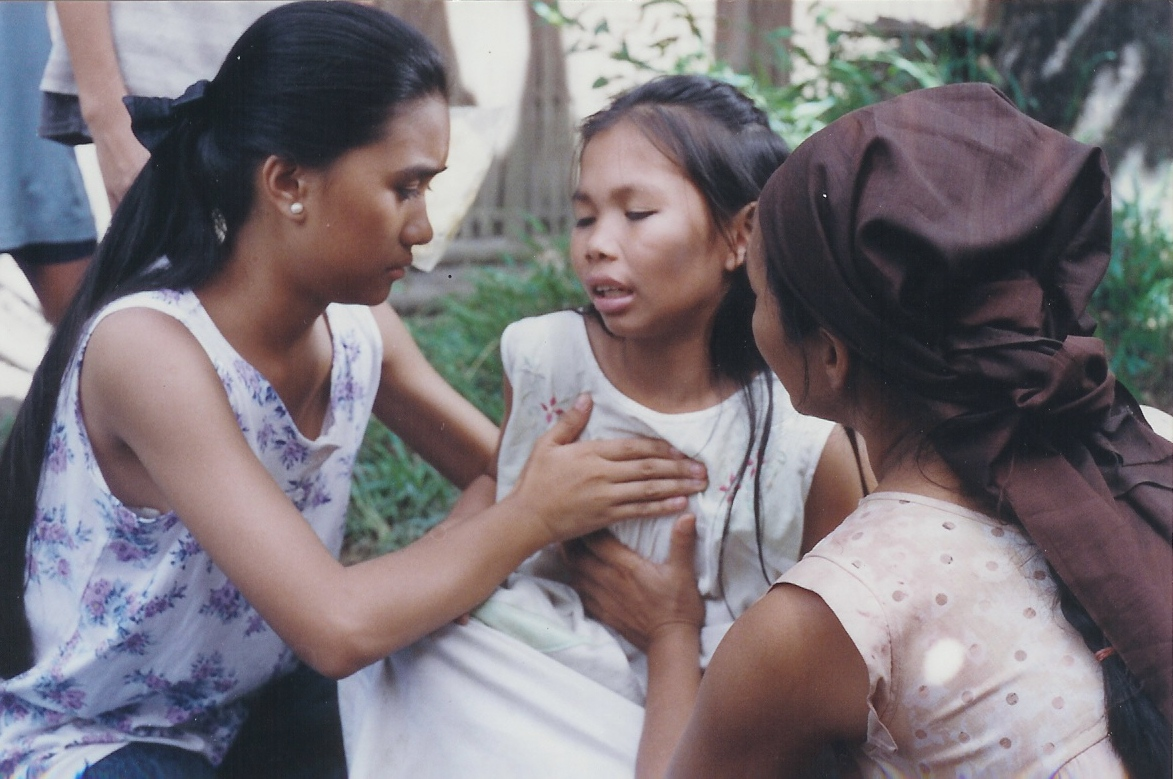
A reason to leave

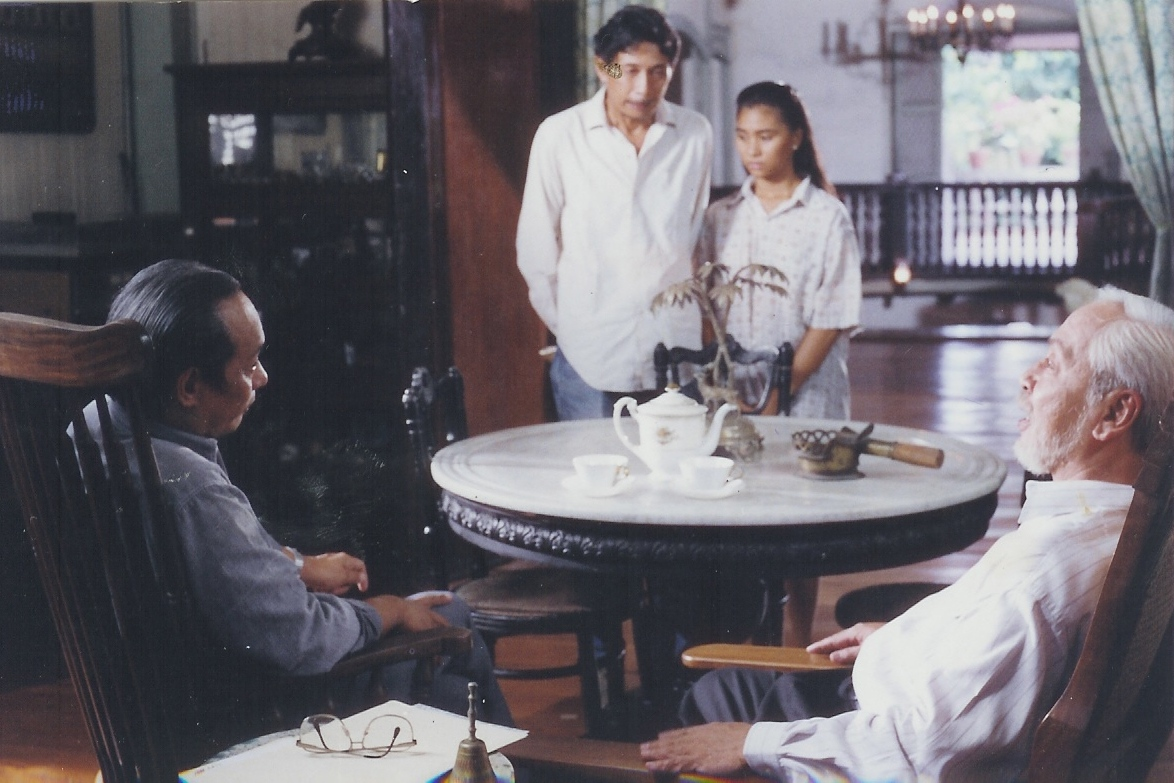
Father and daughter seek help from the plantation owner

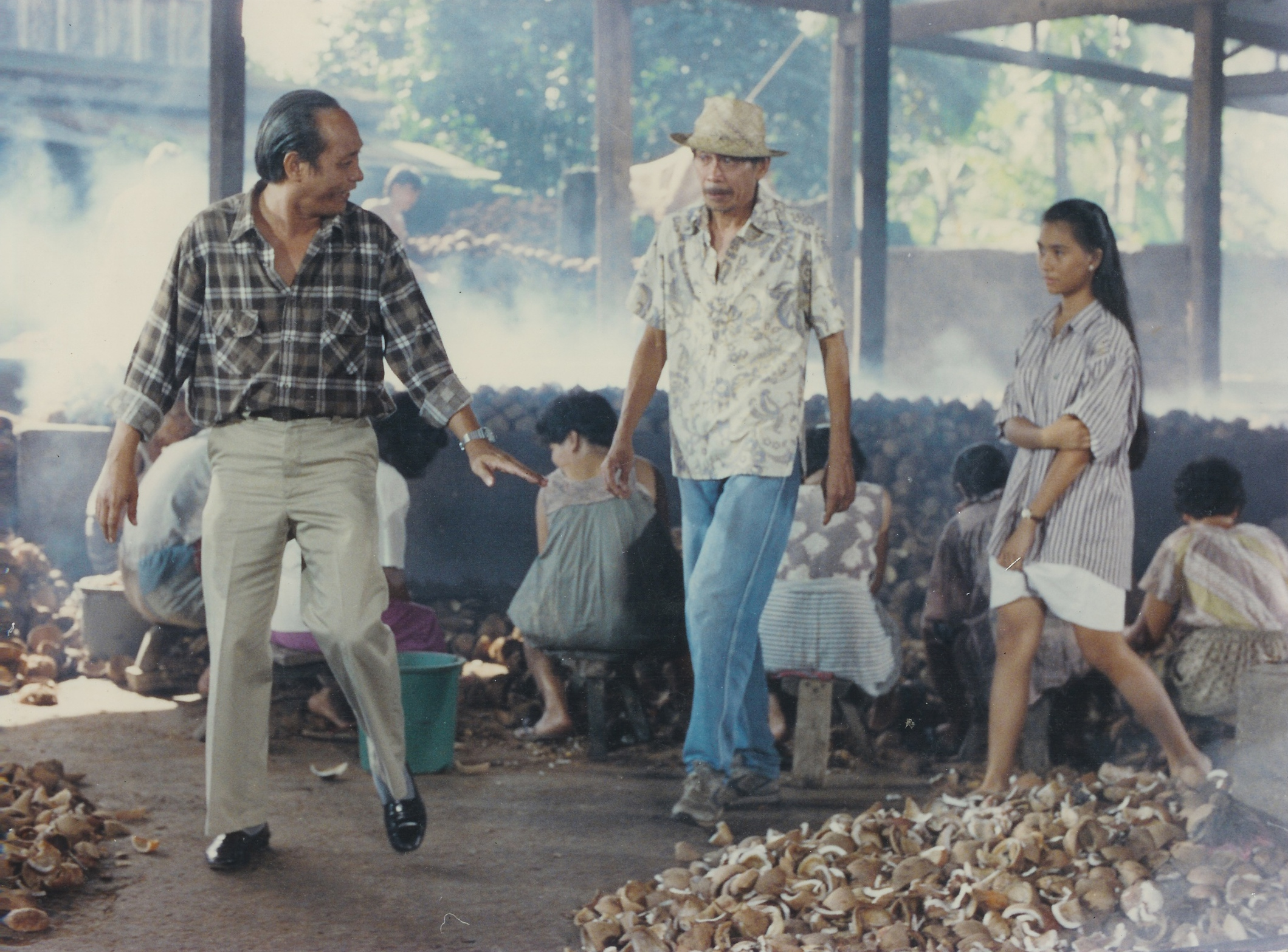
Forced to see the loan shark

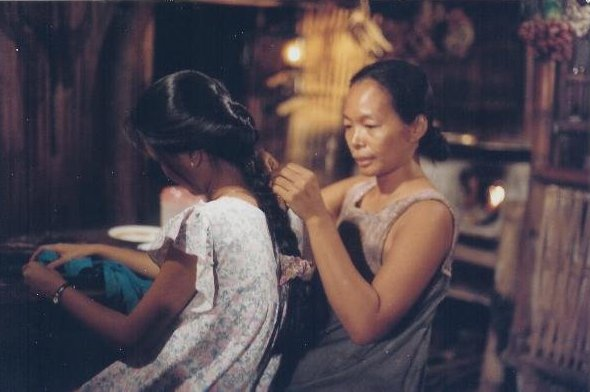
Last night home

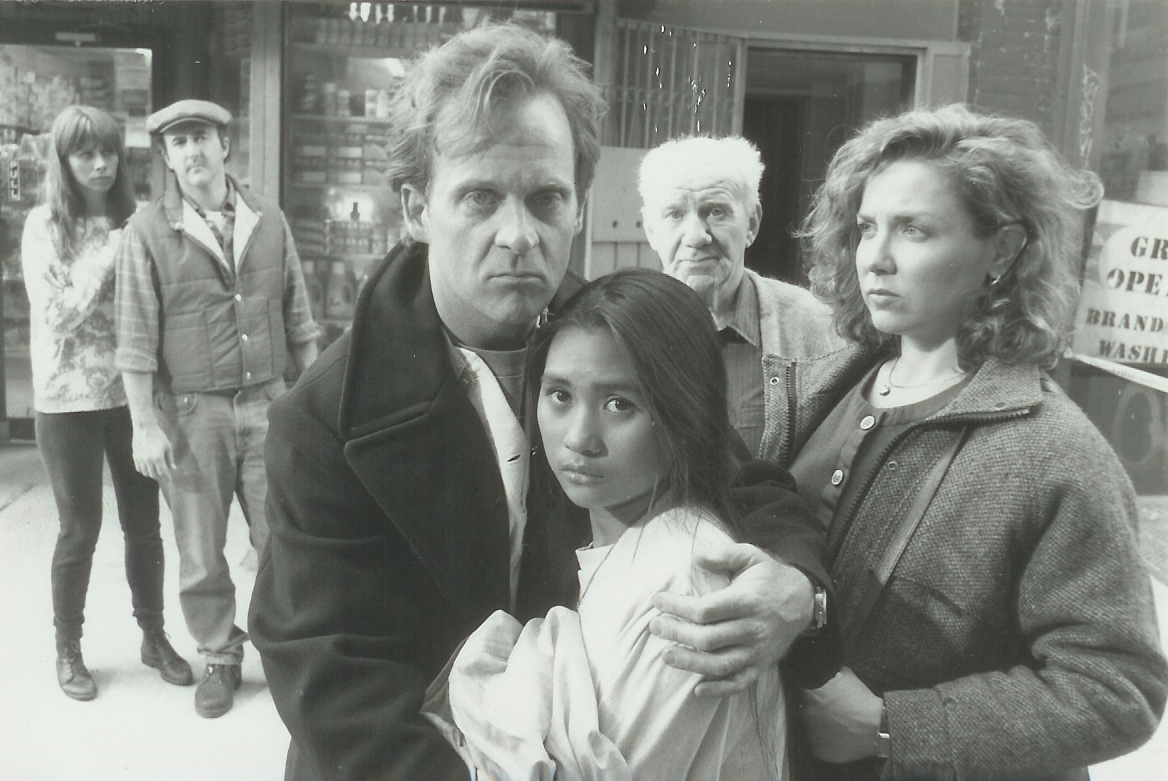
A New York welcoming

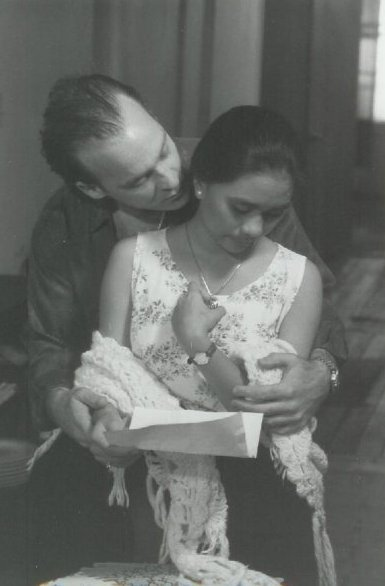
A rude awakening

== Reception ==
=== Critical response ===
==== Initial response ====
"This haunting story of an ex-merchant marine and his mail order fiancé shows the link between marriage and commerce. Closer to Home is a quiet film with a deep impact, showing the tragedy in everyday people living everyday lives."

— CU-Denver Advocate.

On the film's festival release in the United States, Michael Wilmington, reviewing for the Chicago Tribune, wrote, "A poor young woman whose sister needs a heart operation agrees to an arranged marriage so she can earn money in the United States. A fine debut. Another Green Card romance, but this time, the broader canvas---in both the Philippines and the U.S.--gives the story a wider emotional range and a near-epic feel." The Chicago Reader wrote, "An effective low-key film about a lonely New York cabbie who wants to settle down and resorts to purchasing a Filipino mail-order bride... The first half of the film shuttles between the girl’s struggle to pay the extorting marriage broker and the cabdriver’s difficulties making final arrangements of his own. The second half deals with their meeting and the disappointment that ensues after the inevitable cultural clash and dashed expectations. No major surprises in this Philippine/U.S. coproduction, but director Joseph Nobile covers a good deal of ground, both cultural and emotional, with deftness and confidence. The film is also boosted by strong performances from the cast, especially John Michael Bolger as the forlorn cabdriver."

Variety's film critic Derek Elley wrote positively about the film. "A cross-cultural drama with a few fresh twists...that steers clear of most of the normal cliches and shows an unforced, natural feel for its subject ...In her first acting stint, Ortaliz (only 16 when shooting began in late ’92) is the heart and soul of the movie, a seemingly fragile flower but with an iron stem... Flawed only by an unsympathetic male lead and a weakly worked-out denouement...In true indie tradition, the story is worked out through a collection of small incidents and gradual character building rather than sheer plot. Pic’s extensive Philippine scenes are commendable for avoiding the usual “exotic” cliches, and the script is even-handed in a relaxed way in its portraits of the two countries."

The film also elicits a positive reaction from The Philippine American Quarterly, "Closer to Home manages to elude the danger of making a predictable film about a social drama currently being played out in many poor nations, including the Philippines...the film does not really zero in on the mail-order bride problem, it merely uses it as a tool to delve into the complexities of world relationships that are brought to the core when two cultures cross. It is to Nobile's credit that he has managed to assemble an exemplary cast..."

"Filmmaker Nobile has a natural affinity for his characters as they try to overcome the difficulties of a cross-cultural marriage. First-time actor Madeline Ortaliz, only 16 when shooting began, is a marvel as the seemingly fragile Dalisay."

— The Denver Post.

== Reception in the Philippines ==
When Closer to Home was released in the Philippines, the critical reception was overwhelmingly favorable. Nestor Torre Jr., a film critic known for his long-running "Viewfinder" column in the Philippine Daily Inquirer, lauded the film and its message in his review. He wrote, "Filmmaker Joseph Nobile has hit upon a creative and rewarding juxtaposition of two cultures, two families and two interesting individuals...The film's title says it all: the movie is about the characters' contrasting attitudes toward the concept of home. ...On point of performance, John Michael Bolger dominates the film with his complex characterization of Dean. Madeline Ortaliz is well-cast on point of dusky looks and modest ways, and she does have several affecting scenes ... On the whole, though, we're glad we saw this film because it gives us a new look at the Filipino-American relationship on personal, familial and cross-cultural levels. Since America and Western culture play such a big role in our lives, whether we're aware of it or not, and whether we like it or not, viewing the movie can result in reflections that can help clarify that relationship for us. Patience is needed, however, to give the film time to get its story going, and its valuable points, and finally come into its own".

Writing for Malaya (newspaper), film critic Ethel Ramos, Filipino columnist of "STUDIO WHISPERS" said, 'How sad that a foreign director (Joseph Nobile) had to open our eyes to the beauty of our surroundings.'

"I agree with fellow movie columnist George Vail Kabristante that Elibon Film Productions' Closer to Home is a film every Filipino director should take time to watch. It is not only well-crafted (although "tighter" editing could make the film more exciting), it will also make people realize there's so much beauty in our countryside. How sad that a foreign director (Joseph Nobile) should open our eyes to the beauty of our surroundings. Indeed, there is still so much, especially in our barrios, that the government, it's officials and private contracters have yet to explore. Closer to Home is a quiet movie. Yet every scene is so beautifully, so convincingly and honestly presented one cannot help but be touched. The film reflects issues affecting Filipinas today. It shows how wrong Filipinas are in thinking America is the land of milk and honey. And that marrying an American is a dream come true."

Ricky Lo, Entertainment Editor of The Philippine Star wrote in his long-running column "FunFare", "Pinoys in the eyes of a foreign director", "...A film called Closer to Home by independent American filmmaker Joseph Nobile (it's his 'debut' movie) is bound to make heads turn and touch a lot of Filipino hearts. I saw a preview of Closer to Home one stormy afternoon at the Mowelfund Center and I was impressed by Nobile's ability to capture the sensibility of the Filipino in the tightly edited and finely-acted drama about a Filipina (played by newcomer Madeline Ortaliz, a cross between Princess Punzalan and Cecile Castillo, who was discovered during an audition of more than 200 aspirants)... Done in a span of four years (lack of logistics, you know), Closer to Home should be seen not only by Filipino filmmakers who must have become so accustomed to things and places 'local' that they take certain details for granted and therefore don't portray Filipino-ness as faithfully as it is done by, irony of ironies, this American who must have been a Filipino in his previous life."

Abante film critic Billy Balbastro wrote in his popular column, "Take Billy", "The Great American Dream, From Lino Brocka's 'Hellow, Soldier' and 'PX' to Joseph Nobile's 'Closer to Home', the American dream remains the same!"

"We pay tribute to Nobile who catches the pathos, the humor in the midst of poverty, the beauty in simple lives. As he follows the story of factory worker Dalisay (commendably portrayed by first timer Madeline Ortaliz, 19 of New Era U.) and how her father (Joonee Gamboa) moves heaven and earth to send her to America, we also take in a former Merchant Marine, dogged by his family to sell their house, hoping to make a match through a marriage bureau...Nobile's story is lucid; its cinematography, superb; the movie as a whole, well-acted and deftly-crafted. I especially like the fast-paced noisy beginning (the Pahiyas in Lucban) and the slow, eloquent pathetic, silent ending in contrast."

In November 1999, after the film finished its long festival run and had its theatrical release in the Philippines, Balbastro followed up in his "Take Billy" column by writing, "Finally, 'Closer to Home' comes home!"

"Sometime in 1995, we wrote in glowing terms as a way of encouragement about a quiet yet eloquent film done by an American filmmaker, Joseph Nobile, reflecting the Filipino's American dream. Well-crafted and well-acted, Closer to Home is a social drama filmed in the Philippines and in America about a Filipina mail-order bride. The Nobile movie mirrors the typical Filipino family's fantasy and illusion about America and Americans and the reality of life in the Big Apple to a young Filipina who tries to pursue her dream, but always with her family in the Philippines in mind...Closer to Home belongs to the first batch of 'wholesome, intelligent films' for the discriminating Filipino audience and here we can see ourselves in the eyes of an American who loves us. This column is our way of thanking, of paying tribute to director-producer Joseph Nobile who catches the pathos, the humor in the midst of poverty, the beauty in simple lives, ours. I'm sure he is more in love with us and our people than we are with him. Thank you, Joseph, for Closer to Home."

Film critic Gibbs Cadiz, reviewing for The Manila Times, wrote"...Nobile, a US-based director, has crafted a no-frills but enormously appealing film, thanks to its emotionally resonant subject matter ( a mail-order marriage between an impoverished Pinay and a disaffected, rootless American fortysomething), the largely unknown cast's overall competence, and the director's apparent compassion for and understanding of his characters, whether Pinoy or not...For a while, Closer to Home teeters on the edge of cliche in delineating one more tale of a cross-cultural romance gone sour (some of the characters' names-Dalisay, Luningning-betray a whiff of romanticized nostalgia for the Amorsoloesque Philippine countryside of old), but Nobile knows how to pull his punches...In fact, what's remarkable about Nobile's film is how it manages to be affecting without being melodramatic...This is refreshing filmmaking".

Lourd de Veyra in his film review for Today's Weekender Newspaper wrote, " 'Home' is Where the Art is...NEWCOMER WITH A DRAMATIC ENTRY-Virtual unknown Madeline Ortaliz, then 19 years old, delivers a searing dramatic performance."

"Think about it. Why hasn't anybody thought of a story like Closer to Home? The plot is simple, but it's something that is very real to a lot of Filipino-families: poor girl from the barrios goes to the States as a mail-order bride, but they don't get to live happily ever after. It took a foreigner to tackle the subject, an Italian-American director named Joseph Nobile. And he tackles it poignantly. This is a finely acted film, and Ortaliz is perfect for the role of an innocent, young and desperate probinsiyana. Ortaliz, then just 19 years of age, was picked from the 300-plus girls who auditioned. Nobile considered her long hair, dark, petite, morena features perfect for the role. One of Ortaliz's assets, however, is her eyes-the expressiveness of which would do any Ate Guy fan proud.

"Bolger plays his character with brilliant understatement, and shows intensity toward the end. Director Nobile-who cowrote the screenplay along with Ruben Arthur Nicdao-knows when to pull back just when the narrative begins steering into melodramatic territory. Nobile's film offers no earthshaking element, which is precisely his point. This is a quiet movie, but the tension is palpable inside Dean's claustrophobic flat. It is small, dark and dingy; the silence punctured by the sound of the train passing by-a stark contrast to the wide verdant fields Dalisay had left. Also worth noting is Nobile's ear for Pinoy cultural sensibility-evident in certain provincial scenes. His camera seems to find wonder in ricefields, the picturesque ridges of Tagaytay, the coconut huskers, the carabaos plowing. One of the most effective scenes, however, is the jeepney ride taking Dalisay to the airport-unspoken feelings of mirth and sadness hang in the air, while strains of Ryan Cayabyab's "Paraiso" play in the background".

Manila Bulletin Entertainment Editor Crispina Martinez-Belen wrote, " 'Closer to Home' is very Filipino from whichever angle you look at it. It has, to my humble thinking, captured the Filipino heart and soul with its presentation of local colors and sentiments, in ways not forced but spontaneous."

=== Retrospective evaluation ===
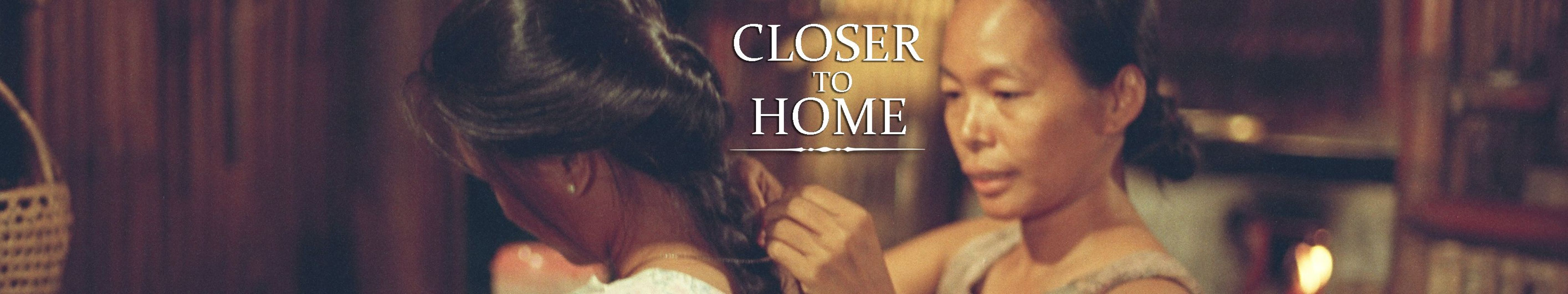
Publicity still from 1995 Closer to Home

On the film's 30th anniversary, New York film critic Prairie Miller of the New York Film Critics Online, (NYFCO), wrote in Arts Express, "Closer to Home: Looking For America Review - Class And Culture Conflict Revisited"

"On this 30th Anniversary revisiting of the Joseph Nobile directed cross-cultural dramatic feature Closer To Home, there is rare welcome insight into diverse global perspectives beyond the usual Euro-centric world view that despite its three decades, sustains a scarce class conscious contemporary relevance...Filmed in part with a profound sense of genuinely conceived poverty and exploitation in the Philippines, the narrative follows Dalisay (16 year old Madeline Ortaliz when filming began) - a rural young woman who applies through a corrupt local agency to be selected as a US bound mail order bride, with the intent of being able to send money back to her impoverished family, and a sister in dire need of a operation they cannot afford...But expectations crumble at both ends - for Dalisay who imagines the US as a country ripe with financial opportunity - and Dean (John Michael Bolger), the middle aged American who has essentially purchased her, and is himself barely making ends meet as a New York City cab driver. And with Dean idealizing Dalisay as a fantasy he cannot essentially satisfy, because he as well ironically buys into the national delusion that there is no such thing as class, in that false socio-economic notion of America...

"And though the film presents an uncompromising, determined realistic portrait of the past crafted with unusual depth and stinging social complexity, a clash offscreen with the currently reality in this country is unavoidable - namely with this horrendous moment of US government propagated ICE violence against immigrants, that Dalisay's lack of papers would have more likely kept her under the protection of Dean merely for survival, however horrible and even perilous such an ultimately desperate decision might be."

Ellie Dean, an independent cinema scholar based in Australia writing for Film International (filminc.) on the film's 30th anniversary wrote, "Romance and Devastation: Looking for America in Closer to Home (1995)":

"... Joseph Nobile’s 1995 romance-drama Closer to Home...fits exactly within the (less than favorable) cultural image of mail-order marriages. It’s an unusual way for a film to introduce the character that would aspire to fulfill one half of its central romance. However, paradoxically, it is exactly this sense of ambivalence that makes the film such an effective drama: and a compelling, provocative and socially relevant watch, even in 2026, over three decades on from its original release.

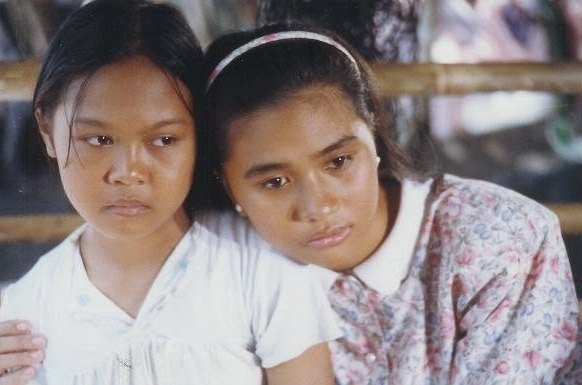
Madeline Ortaliz as Dalisay - production still 1995 film Closer to Home

"At the time of the film’s initial release, Philippine congress had recently enacted new legislation as a response to contemporaneous reports of abuse in marriages between Filipina women and foreign husbands. The Anti Mail-Order Bride Law was passed in 1990: five years before Closer to Home began its extended festival run. The film did not only depict the continuance of such arrangements in defiance of the law; it made the conditions that produce them strikingly apparent. Thousands of women still travel abroad each year in pursuit of financial stability, opportunity, and the possibility of a different life. What gives the film its enduring power, however, is its refusal to reduce those women to statistics or symbols. Through Dalisay, and through the remarkable empathy extended towards her perspective, Closer to Home humanises a highly stigmatised social topic, without compromising one iota of its complexity.

"Although the film’s ending remains somewhat open towards the fates of both characters, it is Dalisay who ultimately emerges as the primary victim. In light of the increasingly hostile landscape of contemporary immigration politics, her story feels all the more devastating—and confronting—to revisit in 2026. Yet the film’s great achievement also lies in its ability to recognise the tragedy on both sides of the relationship. Dean and Dalisay are separated by age, nationality, class and gender, but both remain trapped by visions of an America that does not really exist: a land of prosperity and liberation, where class is irrelevant, and devotion can be bought and sold. The desolation of Dean’s life, ultimately, becomes as socially revealing as Dalisay’s displacement."

Eeya Litiatco-Martin writing in The Philippine Star said, "Closer To Home brings to light a phenomenon most often looked upon with a jaundiced eye, not because of the element of ordinariness that somehow has leeched on to it, but because this portrait of a third world’s social dysfunction (not unique to the Philippines, the situation is replicated in third world countries) has been relatively ignored by various political leaderships and administrations — and worst, largely accepted with disdain and cynical resignation as an unpleasant fact of life.

"It is a riveting film touching on the convoluted evils created by society’s imbalances and the cross-cultural differences of two worlds. An exposition of two societies, two disparate yet similar families, two deeply-feeling contrary personalities with totally contrasting ideas of what “family” should constitute, the film — about a loving Filipino family (Dalisay's) held hostage by poverty and social inequality and at the mercy of centuries-old feudal-type (in)justice — is set in an idyllic third world countryside juxtaposed against the first-world's own unsettling enigma and communal dysfunction (equally regarded with cryptic cynicism in the “land of milk and honey”) and represented by a lower-middle class New York family (Dean's), where relationships (in sharp contrast to Dalisay's family) have been soured by acrimony, bitter jealousies and deeply-rooted resentment. While Dean's messianic hope for love comes in the form of a mail-order bride, Dalisay sees the much-older Dean as a passage to the land that holds the key to her younger sister's survival. (Luningning, the sister, has a congenital heart problem and needs urgent surgery). And while the conflict stems from mutual ideals — Dean pining for the gratification of love and family, Dalisay embodying its sacrificial aspect — the struggle and conflict of the two main characters put together by the transaction and tyranny of love materialize into a crisis. Consequently, the film stirs confusion as the viewer is left to empathize with both characters who assume the dichotomous roles of both hero and villain. Almost immediately, the perceptive viewer realizes that both are at odds with society at large and are inevitable victims of an oppressive state of existence. What is especially notable is the remarkable feat of how the director has added depth to the universal concepts of hope, love and family..."

Closer to Home (film) - The Standoff.jpg

Editor Donato Totaro of the Canadian film Journal, Offscreen published a comprehensive 30th Anniversary retrospective plus director interview for the film in their Precarity and Labour in Cinema issue, "The Travails of a Mail Order Bride":

"Closer to Home is an impressive film by American-Italian director Joseph Nobile that takes as its subject ‘regular’ folk, the American lower working class and a Filipino farming family living in servitude, a class of people who are rarely depicted with such honesty and authenticity in mainstream movies. The film began its festival life in my home town Montreal on August 30, 1995 at the now defunct World Film Festival. (Festival des films du monde de Montréal). 1 Although the film played at many other international film festivals in 1995 and 1996 and was warmly received in the Philippines in 1999, it has never received the proper recognition it deserves, especially considering how relevant its themes of cross border living, immigration and the diasporic experience are in today’s ever worsening geo-political landscape. Thankfully, the film has begun to receive more critical exposure and recognition in cultural circles. The film also received its first physical media release in 2004 from Elibon Films. Hopefully there will be a high definition upgrade in the future now that the film is getting more recognition.

"While Dalisay’s family is loving and nurturing, Dean’s family is egotistical and dysfunctional. What strengthens the otherwise simple story and adds to the thematic weight is it’s dialectical narrative structure...Nobile uses visual language and every formal gesture to set up the two (mostly) clashing worlds before bringing them together in the film’s second hour. "What follows is a surprising twist, a social miracle of sorts and makes for a powerful emotional wallop. His cousin Nick, who up until now has resented Dean and treated him with contempt spots him through the storefront window. At the same time his sister Jan drives up to the store and notices Dean’s predicament. Rather than gloating at Dean’s failure, which we would expect based on their previous behaviour, Nick and Jan walk over to Dean, each take one of his arms, lift him up and walk him into his apartment. The gesture of family support marks a beautiful moment of grace, and connects back to the family values seen in the Philippine scenes. Have the values of Dalisay somehow carried over? In a continuous shot the camera leaves Dean, Nick and Jan as they exit the frame into the doorway and cranes up along the steel girder of an underpass to the building before fading to black.This story ends here but it is one of many similar stories of failed dreams and social inequities that exist across two different cultures. While the rigid class framework steeped in the colonial past that keeps Dalisay’s family poor may seem a world apart from the land of the free, Dean’s troubled family history, possible psychological traumas and his lack of education erects an equally formidable hurdle to what should be rightly his by birth, ‘the American dream.”

Closer to Home (film) - End of the Line.jpg

Reviewing for the Manila Bulletin's USA Edition, film critic Raffy Espiritu wrote, "Cinéma Vérité - 'Independent cinema gets a refreshing new addition."

"...While the idea of a 'green card' romance is not uncommon, Nobile's brand of attention on the provincial Dalisay and her Brooklyn-bred suitor gives the concept a fresh, if almost voyeuristic feel. The audience is not only treated to the pair's burgeoning relationship, but is also given a peek into their lives before this relationship even takes place. In fact, half the film is spent setting up the meeting between the two. While this may initially seem to detract from the formula of a fish-out-of-water romance, it also makes abundantly clear the point of the film isn't the young couple, but rather the dream that has brought both of them together. Also, unlike the few jabs Hollywood has taken on the genre, 'Closer to Home' chooses to remain grounded in reality and eschews the general 'love conquers all' ideal for one that may disappoint those looking for that sloppy kiss at the end of the rainbow. I, for one, am thankful that this story doesn't completely try to sugarcoat the issue (despite the impressively virginal Dalisay character), and that is already strong grounds for recommending this feature.

"That said, the film does occasionally suffer from the typical faults of independent cinema: The experience is sometimes interrupted by awkward shot positioning and some abrupt editing. In addition, the film's score, provided by noted Philippine musical artist/composer Ryan Cayabyab, is a disappointing collection of predictable string orchestrations and B-side melodies that do little but detract from the movie's immersion (at least for this reviewer). Taking all into consideration, these issues are minor in light of what has been achieved in 'Closer to Home'. While much can still be said in recognition of the film's casting and social significance, these are, undoubtedly, just another part of a film which, with its true-to-life feel and uncompromising conclusion, accomplishes what many movies fail to do: Create a believable world with believable characters."

Playback:stl film critic Sarah Boslaugh wrote in her review... "Closer to Home is the kind of film that makes me rejoice that I live in the age of the DVD. It's a quintessential festival film (and in fact appeared in over 30 film festivals around the world ca. 1995) that doesn't have the broad-based appeal necessary for a strong theatrical run, yet will be of interest to a substantial number of viewers. Thanks to our technologically-enlightened times you can watch it at home, and as this film has something of the feel of a television movie already it looks perfectly fine on the small screen".

== See also ==
- List of American independent films
- List of American films of 1995
- List of foreign films shot in the Philippines
- List of films set in New York City
- 1995 in film
- American eccentric cinema
