= Cory Danziger =

American actor

- Born: Los Angeles County, California, United States
- Occupation(s): Actor, Conceptual Artist
- Years active: 1987–present

Cory Danziger is an American actor, political activist, and conceptual artist. He is sometimes mis-credited as Cory Danzinger.

Danziger was born in Los Angeles County, California. As an actor, his most notable role was as Dave Peterson, the son of Tom Hanks' and Carrie Fisher's characters in the 1989 cult film The 'Burbs. For his role he was nominated for a Young Artist Award in the Best Young Actor Starring in a Motion Picture category. That was his third nomination for the award, the other two being Best Young Actor Starring in a TV Movie, Pilot or Special for his performance in Married to the Mob (1988) and Best Young Actor, Featured, Co-starring, Supporting, Recurring Role in a Comedy or Drama Series or Special for the Beauty and the Beast television series, his 1987 acting debut.

In 1990, he appeared as the character Jake Potts in an episode of Star Trek: The Next Generation entitled "Brothers".

His most recent role came in 2007, after a gap of fourteen years, as the voice of "Sean" in the television series The Magic 7.

Danziger co-owns SceneFour and co-created The Original Lefty's, in Los Angeles, California. SceneFour is an art team focused on the release of visual art collections created with acclaimed musicians. SceneFour has released art collections with drummers Chad Smith, Bill Ward, and Steven Adler. In 2007, Danziger left the helm of The Original Lefty's.

Danziger is a partner with Bootsy Collins in the latter's Funk University, an online bass guitar school founded in 2010.
