= The Impostors =

- DVD cover
- Directed by: Stanley Tucci
- Written by: Stanley Tucci
- Produced by: Elizabeth W. Alexander; Stanley Tucci
- Starring: Oliver Platt; Stanley Tucci; Teagle F. Bougere; Elizabeth Bracco; Steve Buscemi; Billy Connolly; Allan Corduner
- Cinematography: Ken Kelsch
- Edited by: Suzy Elmiger
- Music by: William Cook; Gary DeMichele
- Distributed by: Fox Searchlight Pictures; 20th Century Fox
- Release date: October 2, 1998 (United States)
- Running time: 101 minutes
- Country: United States
- Language: English
- Box office: $2.2 million

The Impostors is a 1998 American farce film, directed, written, and produced by Stanley Tucci, starring Oliver Platt, Tucci, Alfred Molina, Tony Shalhoub, Steve Buscemi, Hope Davis, Elizabeth Bracco, Lili Taylor, Michael Emerson, Allison Janney, Allan Corduner, Isabella Rossellini, and Billy Connolly.

The film, in which Oliver Platt and Stanley Tucci play a Laurel and Hardy-like odd couple of out-of work actors, is set in the depression-era 1930s; indeed, the retro style of the film is a re-creation of 1930s screwball comedy. The opening silent sequence harks back to the golden days of silent film.

The film was screened in the Un Certain Regard section at the 1998 Cannes Film Festival.

== Plot ==
In New York City in 1938, Arthur and Maurice scrape together a living on petty swindles, practicing their acting technique whenever they can. Following a drunken confrontation with pretentious and dreadful Shakespearean actor Sir Jeremy Burtom, they are forced to hide as stowaways on an ocean liner.

Unfortunately for the duo, Burtom himself turns out to be a passenger on the ship, along with a diverse ensemble of larger-than-life characters: a suicidal crooner named Happy Franks, who sobs through a song; Mr. Sparks, an aging gay professional tennis player; the first mate Voltri, who is also a mad bomber with his own language; and many more.

Mistaken identities, pratfalls, slapstick, outrageous dialogue, and general mayhem ensue.

== Cast ==
- Oliver Platt as Maurice
- Stanley Tucci as Arthur
- David Lipman as Baker In Kramer's Pastries
- Alfred Molina as Sir Jeremy Burtom
- Michael Emerson as Burtom's Assistant
- Matt Malloy as Mike, Who Plays Laertes In "Hamlet"
- Lili Taylor as Lily "Lil"
- Tony Shalhoub as Voltri, First Mate
- Teagle F. Bougere as Sheik
- Elizabeth Bracco as Pancetta Leaky
- Steve Buscemi as "Happy" Franks
- Dana Ivey as Mrs. Essendine
- Hope Davis as Emily Essendine
- Allison Janney as Maxine
- Matt McGrath as Detective Marco
- Richard Jenkins as Johnny Leguard
- Isabella Rossellini as The Veiled Queen
- Allan Corduner as Captain
- Campbell Scott as Meistrich
- Billy Connolly as Mr. Sparks, The Tennis Pro
- Lewis J. Stadlen as Bandleader
- Woody Allen as Audition Director (uncredited)

== Production ==
Stanley Tucci and producer Elizabeth W. Alexander pitched the film to studios but were initially unable to persuade one to support the initial budget of $12 million. Eventually, Fox Searchlight was able to finance the film at $8 million.

The genesis of the principal characters in "The Impostors" began earlier, when Tucci and Oliver Platt were acting at Yale along with Tony Shalhoub. Subsequently, Tucci and Platt teamed up as a pair of dognappers in the 1992 movie Beethoven. Based on their experiences acting together, Tucci developed "The Impostors" for himself and Platt to capitalize on their physical appearance, although Tucci did not "think of us as the next Laurel and Hardy, even though we are shaped and named just like Stan and Ollie." The script for "The Impostors" was completed in late 1996, and the movie went into production by the middle of 1997.

On-location filming took place in New York and New Jersey, with other filming taking place at an ocean liner set built for the movie at Silvercup Studios in Queens. Filming was completed late in 1997.

== Reception ==
The Impostors holds a 63% approval rating on Rotten Tomatoes based on 38 reviews, with an average rating of 6.4/10. The consensus states: "The Impostors might have benefited from a more consistently witty script, but writer-director Stanley Tucci acquits himself nicely as an orchestrator of screwball comedy in this uneven debut."

In 2021, Tucci said that when anyone tells him that The Impostors is their favorite movie, he "accuse[s] them of having escaped from an asylum," and that if someone else had directed it, "then I think it would have been a really good movie."
