= Jo Anderson =

American actress

- Born: Mary Jo Anderson; 1958 (age 68); Brooklyn, New York, U.S.
- Education: Academy of the Holy Angels; Adelphi University
- Occupation: Actress
- Years active: 1983–2014

Mary Jo Anderson (born 1958) is an American actress, best known for her roles as Diana Bennett in Beauty and the Beast and Julia Ann Mercer in JFK.

== Early life and career ==
Born in Brooklyn to an Irish-Catholic family, but raised—from the age of six months on—in Tenafly, New Jersey, Anderson is one of four siblings. After attending Academy of the Holy Angels (class of 1976), she studied at Adelphi University for two years.

The in-print descriptions of this 5-foot-6 1/2-inch (169 cm) "red-haired beauty" most frequently seen during the 1980s—highlighting both hair, height, and "pale skin"–make it all bit impossible to miss Anderson's very brief, uncredited turn as the "slow dancing" girl in the 1985 dramedy, Heaven Help Us.

She starred opposite Ron Perlman as Diana Bennett in Beauty and the Beast after Linda Hamilton's departure and her character Catherine's death in 1989. She has had guest-starring appearances in many television shows, has appeared in many movies such as Oliver Stone's JFK, Kenneth Branagh's Dead Again and Rob Cohen's Daylight, as well as many TV-movies, and guest-starred in TV shows such ER, C.S.I. Miami, Millennium, Northern Exposure, and Glee. She also appeared in two episodes of Perception in 2014.

== Personal life ==
While residing in Hoboken during the 1980s, Anderson, prompted by a public screening of the 1983 television movie, The Day After, was one of the co-founders of Hoboken Action for Nuclear Disarmament (HAND).

== Selected filmography ==
=== TV series ===
- Miami Vice - TV series, (4x02) "Amen... Send Money" (1987)
- Thirtysomething (1988)
- Dream Street (1989)
- Columbo: Uneasy Lies the Crown (1990)
- Beauty and the Beast (1990)
- Northern Exposure (1992–1993)
- Sisters (1991)
- High Incident (1997)
- Millennium (1997)
- Legacy (1998)
- Roswell (1999–2001)
- The Closer (2005)
- ER (2006)
- CSI: Crime Scene Investigation (2007)
- C.S.I. Miami (2007)
- Glee (2010)
- Perception (2014)

=== Movies ===
- Heaven Help Us (1985)
- Miles from Home (1988)
- Dead Again (1991)
- JFK (1991)
- Season Of Change (1994)
- Daylight (1996)
- Rain (2001)
- Fat Rose and Squeaky (2006)

=== TV movies ===
- I Saw What You Did (1988)
- Prime Target (1989)
- Columbo: Uneasy Lies the Crown (1990)
- Decoration Day (1990)
- Jack Reed: Badge of Honor (1993)
- One Woman's Courage (1994)
- Menendez: A Killing in Beverly Hills (1994)
- From the Earth to the Moon (1998)
- The Sky's On Fire (1998)
