= The Golden Holiday =

2020 South Korean action comedy film

- Poster
- Directed by: Kim Bong-Han
- Screenplay by: Kim Bong-Han
- Produced by: Shin Min-Chul; Jang Sung-Won
- Starring: Kwak Do-won; Kim Dae-myung; Kim Sang-ho; Kim Hee-won
- Production companies: Changchun Film Co., Ltd.
- Distributed by: Showbox
- Release date: 29 September 2020
- Running time: 106 minutes
- Country: South Korea
- Language: Korean

The Golden Holiday (Korean: 국제수사; RR: Gukjesusa) is a 2020 South Korean action comedy film written and directed by Kim Bong-Han, starring Kwak Do-won, Kim Dae-myung, Kim Sang-ho and Kim Hee-won. The film follows a detective who takes his family on a trip to Philippines and becomes a murder suspect, only to become further entangled with a criminal organization as he starts investigating the case with the help of a tourist guide, in order to clear his name. The film co-stars Shin Seung-hwan, Shin Dong-mi and Lee Han-seo. Actors Son Hyun-joo and Jo Jae-yoon make cameo appearances. It is director Kim's third film after The Hero (2013) and Ordinary Person (2017). Filipino actor Mon Confiado makes his South Korean film debut with the film shot mostly in Philippines.

The film was originally scheduled for release on August 19, 2020, but was indefinitely delayed due to resurgence in the COVID-19 cases. It was released theatrically on 29 September 2020.

== Synopsis ==
Hong Byeong-soo, a Daecheon detective, takes his family to the Philippines on his 10th anniversary, with the hidden intention of tracking down his old friend Yong-bae who scammed him and got away with it a few years ago. In Manila, Byeong-soo finds himself framed for a murder and sets out to prove his innocence by investigating his own case with the help of Man-Cheol, a tourist guide. With their investigation not going well, Byeong-soo then discovers Yong-bae in prison and learns about a case surrounding "Yamashita's Gold". As Yong-bae offers him a good share of gold, Byeong-soo becomes embroiled in the case.

== Cast ==
- Kwak Do-won as Hong Byeong-soo
  - Yu Jin-Woo as young Hong Byeong-soo
- Kim Dae-myung as Hwang Man-cheol
  - Lee Chan-yoo as young Hwang Man-cheol
- Kim Sang-ho as Kim Yong-bae
  - Kang Chae-min as young Kim Yong-bae
- Kim Hee-won as Patrick
- Shin Seung-hwan as Park Chun-shik
- Shin Dong-mi as Mi-yeon
- Lee Han-seo as Ji-yoon
- Son Hyun-joo as Detective Kang
- Jo Jae-yoon as Detective Ahn
- Lee Bong-ryun as Bank employee
- Mon Confiado as PLT. Shawn Martinez, Philippine National Police officer.
- Cindy Miranda as Linda
- Loren Burgos as Stella
- Christian Villete as Tambay #1
- Fredie Abao as Tambay #2
- Neil Ryan Sese as Boss

== Production and Opening ==
The movie was filmed in a location in the Philippines in 2018, and many local residents participated. At that time, the title was 'Package'. More than 80% of the movie was filmed in the Philippines. During filming, the crew encountered typhoons and heatwaves, and had difficulties in recruiting locations and supplying personnel.

Director Kim Bong-han said that he was inspired by the movie "The Hangover" and thinks it's more of a 'children's commotion' than a noir crime drama. It is said that the main subject of the film, 'Yamashita Gold', was actually read from a book and conceived of the story of the gold left by the former Japanese military in the Philippine sea.

The movie was scheduled to be released in the first half of 2020, but due to the COVID-19 pandemic, it was first postponed to August, and then again to September, the Chuseok holiday. In the process, the editing was revised to focus on the events rather than the emotions of the characters to be suitable for a family movie.
