= Bluebeard (2017 film) =

- Theatrical release poster
- Hangul: 해빙
- Hanja: 解氷
- RR: Haebing
- MR: Haebing
- Directed by: Lee Soo-yeon
- Written by: Lee Soo-yeon
- Produced by: Cho Jeong-jun
- Starring: Cho Jin-woong; Shin Goo; Kim Dae-myung; Song Young-chang; Lee Chung-ah; Yoon Se-ah
- Cinematography: Uhm Hye-jung
- Edited by: Kim Sun-min
- Production companies: Withus Film; Bull Pictures Inc
- Distributed by: Lotte Entertainment
- Release date: March 1, 2017
- Running time: 117 minutes
- Country: South Korea
- Language: Korean
- Box office: US$8.9 million

Bluebeard (Korean: 해빙; RR: Haebing; lit. 'Thawing') is a 2017 South Korean psychological thriller film written and directed by Lee Soo-yeon, starring Cho Jin-woong, Shin Goo, Kim Dae-myung, Song Young-chang, Lee Chung-ah, and Yoon Se-ah. It was released on March 1, 2017.

== Synopsis ==
Seung-Hoon (Cho Jin-Woong) is a physician who opened a clinic in Seoul but went bankrupt. He landed a job at a hospital and soon gets involved in a series of murder cases when his patient murmurs something disturbing.

== Cast ==
- Cho Jin-woong as Byun Seung-hoon
- Shin Goo as Jung Sung-geun's father
- Kim Dae-myung as Jung Sung-geun
- Song Young-chang as Jo Kyung-hwan / Nam In-soo
- Lee Chung-ah as Mi-yeon
- Yoon Se-ah as Jo Soo-jung
- Kim Joo-ryoung as Mi-sook
- Yoon Da-kyung as Ji-sook
- Kim Kyung-min as Hospital Director
- Lee Kang-jae as Jung Kyung-soo
- Mun Junghyun as Byun Young-hoon
- Jung Do-won as Tattoo man
- Jung Ah-mi as Bae Jung-ja
- Marie-Joelle Afarti as Jung Kyung-soo's mother
- Han Chul-woo ad Jurisdiction Detective
- Jo Suk-hyun - Captain of Gangnam Detective Squad
- Park Hee-jung as Opening DJ
- Koo Eun-jung as Weather Caster

== Production ==
Bluebeard is director Lee Soo-yeon's first feature film in fourteen years after her 2003 film The Uninvited. Cho Jin-woong, who played a doctor suffering a mental breakdown, lost nearly 40 pounds (18 kilograms) for his role in the film.

Filming began on July 20, 2015, and ended on October 7, 2015. The film was shot entirely in South Korea, and partially in the Philippines for the ending scene where the teenager met his Filipina mother.

== Release ==
Bluebeard was released in theaters on March 1, 2017. It drew 386,088 viewers on its first day of release, setting the record for the best March opening ever in South Korea. The film was sold to Japan, Hong Kong, Macau, the Philippines, and received a limited North American release in the U.S. and Canada. The film was also selected to screen at the Brussels International Fantastic Film Festival, the Hawaii International Film Festival and the Udine Far East Film Festival in Italy.

== Awards and nominations ==
Year	Award	Category	Recipient	Result
2017	1st The Seoul Awards	Best Supporting Actor	Kim Dae-myung	Nominated
2017	26th Buil Film Awards	Best Actor	Cho Jin-woong	Nominated
2017	26th Buil Film Awards	Best Supporting Actor	Kim Dae-myung	Nominated
2017	26th Buil Film Awards	Best Screenplay	Lee Soo-yeon	Nominated
2017	38th Blue Dragon Film Awards	Best Supporting Actor	Kim Dae-myung	Nominated
2018	23rd Chunsa Film Art Awards	Best Supporting Actor	Kim Dae-myung	Nominated
