= Elizabeth Bracco =

American actress

- Born: Brooklyn, New York, U.S.
- Occupation: Actress
- Spouse: Aidan Quinn (m. 1987)
- Children: 2
- Relatives: Lorraine Bracco (sister)

Elizabeth Bracco is an American actress best known for her role as Marie Spatafore, the wife of Vito Spatafore, on the HBO TV series The Sopranos. Her sister Lorraine Bracco also appears in The Sopranos as Jennifer Melfi.

== Early life ==
Elizabeth Bracco is a daughter of Eileen (née Molyneux) and Salvatore Bracco, Sr. Salvatore was of Italian descent. Eileen was born in England and had French ancestry. They met during World War II. Eileen came with Salvatore to the U.S. as a war bride.

Bracco was raised on Long Island.

== Career ==
Bracco has appeared in a number of other films, including Mystery Train, Louis & Frank, Trees Lounge, and The Impostors. She has played minor roles in the movies The Color of Money, Stakeout, and Analyze This. In addition to portraying Vito Spatafore's wife on The Sopranos, Bracco appeared in the pilot of the TV series Crime Story.

== Personal life ==
In 1987, Bracco married her Stakeout co-star, Aidan Quinn. They have two daughters, one of whom has autism. Formerly residents of Englewood, New Jersey, Bracco and her family reside in Palisades and Marbletown, New York.

== Filmography ==
=== Film ===
Year	Title	Role	Notes
1986	The Color of Money	Diane at Bar	
1987	Stakeout	Bar Waitress	
1989	Mystery Train	Dee Dee	
1990	Denial	Lizzie	
1991	Jumpin' at the Boneyard	Cathy	
1992	In the Soup	Jackie	
1993	Money for Nothing	Eleanor Coyle	
1993	Household Saints	Fran	
1994	Somebody to Love	Taxi Dancer	
1995	Closer to Home (film)	Alma	
1996	Trees Lounge	Theresa	
1996	The First Wives Club	Dancer	
1998	Louis & Frank	Angeline Di Buffoni	
1999	The 24 Hour Woman	Nurse	
1999	Analyze This	Marie Vitti	
2002	13 Moons	Louise Potter	
2007	Interview	Woman at Restaurant	

=== Television ===
Year	Title	Role	Notes
1986	Crime Story	Waitress	Episode: "Pilot"
1988	The Street	Cynthia Scolari	Episode: "They Drink Human Milk"
1993	TriBeCa	Bridal Consultant	Episode: "The Hopeless Romantic"
2006–2007	The Sopranos	Marie Spatafore	8 episodes
