= Kim Dae-myung =

South Korean actor (born 1980)

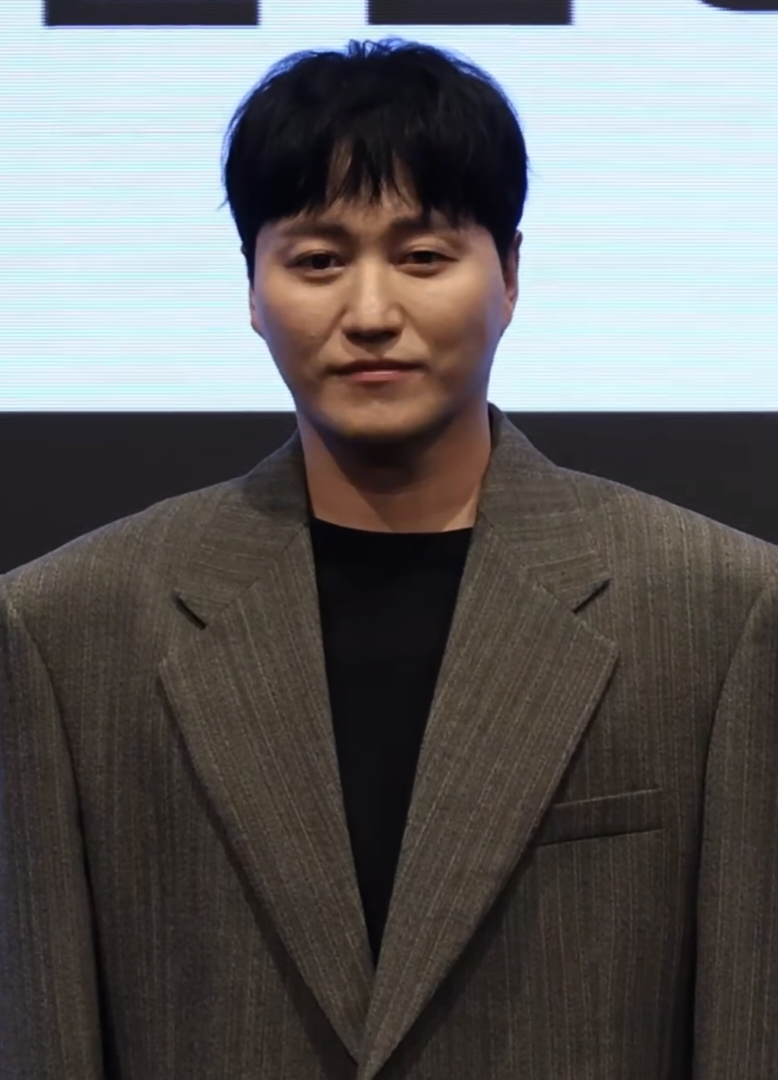
- Kim in July 2026
- Born: February 16, 1981 (age 45); Seoul, South Korea
- Education: Sungkyunkwan University – Acting for Theater, Film & TV
- Occupation: Actor
- Years active: 2006–present
- Agent: United Artists Agency
- Height: 180 cm (5 ft 11 in)

Korean name
- Hangul: 김대명
- Hanja: 金大明
- RR: Gim Daemyeong
- MR: Kim Taemyŏng

Kim Dae-myung (born February 16, 1981) is a South Korean actor. He began his acting career in theater, then rose to fame in the television series Misaeng: Incomplete Life (2014), as well as Hospital Playlist (2020).

== Filmography ==
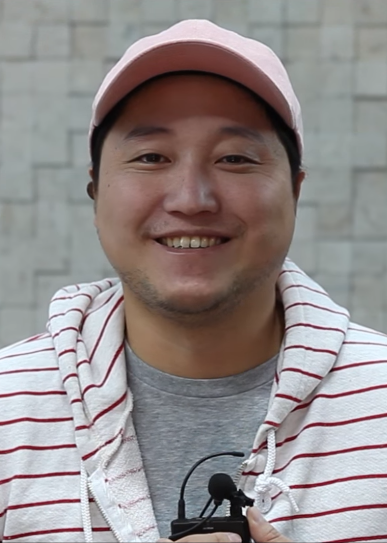
Kim in 2016

=== Film ===
Year	Title	Role	Notes/Ref.
2006	Puzzle		
2010	The Lost Thing		Short film
2010	Blue Ocean		Short film
2012	All Bark No Bite	Doo-chang	
2013	The Terror Live	Park Shin-woo	Voice
2014	Broken	Yang Tae-seop	
2014	The Target	Jang Gyu-ho	
2014	The Fatal Encounter	Kang Yong-hwi	
2014	Tazza: The Hidden Card	Billiards hall owner	
2014	My Dictator	Stage actor	
2015	The Beauty Inside	Woo-jin	
2015	The Exclusive: Beat the Devil's Tattoo	Han Seung-woo	
2015	Inside Men	Reporter Goh	
2016	Pandora	Gil-seop	
2016	Canola	Fitness trainer	Cameo
2016	The Last Princess	Kim Bong-guk	Cameo
2017	Bluebeard	Sung-geun	
2018	Golden Slumber	Jang Dong-gyu	
2018	The Drug King	Lee Doo-hwan	
2020	The Golden Holiday	Hwang Man-cheol	
2020	Stone Skipping	Seok-goo	
2022	Alienoid	Thunder	Voice
TBA	Don't touch dirty hands		

=== Television series ===
Year	Title	Role	Ref.
2014	Misaeng: Incomplete Life	Kim Dong-shik	
2015	KBS Drama Special "Red Moon"	Yi Seon, Prince Sado	
2016	The Sound of Your Heart	Jo Joon	
2020–2021	Hospital Playlist	Yang Seok-hyung	
2024	Light Shop	Kim Sang-hoon (Cameo, Ep.3)	
2025	The Art of Negotiation	Oh Soon-young	
2025	Resident Playbook	Yang Seok-hyeong	
2025	Pigpen	Jin Tae-hee	

=== Television shows ===
Year	Title	Role	Ref.
2021	Wise Mountain Village Life	Cast Member	

=== Music video appearances ===
Year	Song title	Artist
2015	"Think of You"	Youngjun (Brown Eyed Soul)
2024	"Champagne"	Jo Jung-seok

== Discography ==
=== Soundtrack appearances ===
Title	Year	Peak chart positions			Album
Title	Year	KOR	KOR Hot	US World	Album
"Cheer Up" (Friends with Shin Hae Chul Version) (Note: with Kim Sung-kyun, Gang Dong-won, and Shin Hae Chul)	2018	—	—	—	Golden Slumber OST
"Oh! What a Shiny Night (Drama. Ver)" (밤이 깊었네) (Note: Performed with Jo Jung-suk, Yoo Yeon-seok, Jung Kyung-ho and Jeon Mi-do, and released under the band name Mido & Falasol.)	2020	37	24	—	Hospital Playlist OST
"Canon (Drama. Ver)" (캐논)	2020	194	—	—	Hospital Playlist OST
"Me to You, You to Me" (너에게 난, 나에게 넌)	2020	6	5	20	Hospital Playlist OST
"아마추어 (Amateur)" (캐논)	2025	—	—	—	Resident Playbook OST Part 4
"언젠가 눈부시게 빛날 테니 (언눈빛)" (캐논)	2025	—	—	—	Resident Playbook OST Part 8
"—" denotes releases that did not chart or were not released in that region.

== Stage ==
=== Musical ===
Musical play performances
Year	Title		Role	Theater	Date	Ref.
Year	English	Korean	Role	Theater	Date	Ref.
2007	Come to the Ghost House	귀신의 집으로 오세요	Producer	National Theater Jeongdong Theater	April 10, 2007 – May 27, 2007	
2008	Subway Line 1	지하철 1호선	Ttang-soe			
2009	Assassins	어쌔신	John Hinckley Jr.	The Stage	September 26, 2009 – November 8, 2009	

=== Theater ===
Theater play performances
Year	Title		Role	Theater	Date	Ref.
Year	English	Korean	Role	Theater	Date	Ref.
2008	Kang Full's Babo	강풀의 바보	Seung-ryong	Chocolate Factory	November 7, 2008 – December 31, 2008	
2009	Kang Taek-gu	강택구				
2009	Pisces Man	물고기 남자	Kim Jin-man			
2009	The Zoo Story	동물원 이야기	Peter			
2011	One Guy, Two Guys, Riding on a Bumpy Road	한놈 두놈 삑구타고	Lee Nak-joong	The Theater	July 1, 2011 – July 10, 2011	

== Accolades ==
=== Awards and nominations ===
Year	Award	Category	Nominated work	Result	Ref.
2015	51st Paeksang Arts Awards	Best New Actor (TV)	Misaeng: Incomplete Life	Nominated	
2015	8th Korea Drama Awards	Excellence Award, Actor	Misaeng: Incomplete Life	Won	
2015	4th APAN Star Awards	Best Supporting Actor	Misaeng: Incomplete Life	Nominated	
2016	15th KBS Entertainment Awards	Hot Issue Variety Award	The Sound of Your Heart	Won	
2017	1st The Seoul Awards	Best Supporting Actor (Film)	Bluebeard	Nominated	
2017	26th Buil Film Awards	Best Supporting Actor	Bluebeard	Nominated	
2017	38th Blue Dragon Film Awards	Best Supporting Actor	Bluebeard	Nominated	
2018	23rd Chunsa Film Art Awards	Best Supporting Actor	Bluebeard	Nominated	
2021	41st Golden Cinematography Awards	Jury’s Special Award	Stone Skipping	Won	

=== Listicles ===
Name of publisher, year listed, name of listicle, and placement
Publisher	Year	Listicle	Placement	Ref.
Korean Film Council	2021	Korean Actors 200 (Note: Introduces 200 actors that best represent the present and future of Korean cinema to the people in the film industry all over the world.)	Included	
