= John Michael Bolger =

American actor

- Occupation: Actor
- Years active: 1986-present

John Michael Bolger is an American actor who resides in the Hell's Kitchen area of Manhattan's Westside.

Bolger appeared in Michael Mann's Public Enemies, portraying 1930s East Chicago, Indiana detective Martin Zarkovich.

Bolger has also been seen on television in Law & Order: Special Victims Unit, Law & Order: Criminal Intent and Blind Justice. Bolger is perhaps most well known for his three-season run in the NBC hit series Third Watch where series fans know him as Lieutenant Johnson. His television credits span twenty years and include NYPD Blue, Brooklyn South, Beauty and the Beast and ER among others. Bolger has been seen in the films Carlito's Way (starring Al Pacino) and Twins (starring Danny DeVito and Arnold Schwarzenegger). Bolger starred in several independently released films including Rounding First, Closer to Home, and Artists of Hell's Kitchen.

== Filmography ==
=== Film ===
John Michael Bolger film credits
Year	Title	Role	Notes
1986	Parting Glances	Robert	
1988	Twins	Security Guard #2	
1991	Delirious	Len	
1993	Carlito's Way	Cop #1	
1995	Closer to Home	Dean	
1997	Private Parts	Music Awards Technician	
2000	Seed	Francis Seed	
2005	War of the Worlds	Man Holding Woman	
2005	Rounding First	Gene Pierce	
2009	Public Enemies	Martin Zarkovich	
2016	Wolves	Irish	

=== Television ===
John Michael Bolger television credits
Year	Title	Role	Notes
1986	The Equalizer	Bartender	Episode: "Wash Up"
1989–1990	Beauty and the Beast	Det. Greg Hughs	5 episodes
1997	ER	Little League Baseball Trainer	1 episode
1997–1998	Brooklyn South	Officer Tom Pittorino	1 episode
1997–2001	NYPD Blue	Art Boyd / Keith Casey	1 episode
1999	Law & Order	Detective	Episode: "Justice"
1999–2000	Third Watch	Lieutenant Johnson	27 episodes
2005	Blind Justice	Uniform	1 episode
2004	Law & Order	Kenneth Daniels	Episode: "Vendetta"
2005	Law & Order: Criminal Intent	Officer Long	Episode: "Unchained"
2006	Law & Order: Special Victims Unit	Detective Geiger	Episode: "Confrontation"
2012	Person of Interest	Sam Ramano	Episode: "Firewall"
