= Terrylene Sacchetti =

American actress

- Born: Terrylene Theriot; February 5, 1967 (age 59)
- Occupation: Actress
- Known for: Deaf Actress
- Notable work: Natural Born Killers (1994)
- Children: 2
- Website: terrylene.com

Terrylene Sacchetti (born February 5, 1967) is a deaf actress from Chicago, Illinois. She graduated from the Model Secondary School for the Deaf in 1985.

Her most well known work in the film industry is for Natural Born Killers (1994), After Image (2001) and Listen Carefully (1991). She is also known in the deaf community for her advocacy for the right to sign language and early intervention for deaf infants.

== Personal life ==
Terrylene is from a fourth generation deaf family.

She was in a relationship with Robert Manganelli, a film maker until around 2008. They had two children, Gianni (Gio) Manganelli and Catalene Robin Manganelli. Gio died in March 2014. In the wake of his death, she has been vocal about the lack of access to mental health care for deaf persons.

== Career ==
=== Deaf rights ===
In 1994, a Los Angeles Burger King drive-up window refused to fill Terrylene's order that she tried to give in writing. She sued Burger King for discrimination and was hired as a consultant to help implement electronic ordering devices for the deaf.

=== Deaf education ===
Terrylene launched "Clerc's Children". An online bilingual (English/ASL) educational website for families with deaf infants and toddlers.

=== Deaf art ===
Terrylene is "co-founder and executive director of the Deaf Arts Council (DAC)".

She held that position for five years. At that time she received a Department of Education grant of $350,000 and an additional donation of $500,000 from film studios in Hollywood to fund this project. She also received a grant to do a deaf film making summer camp.

== Filmography ==
In 1999, she appeared together with her son in an Oreo's commercial. The commercial shows the two of them discussing in ASL the various ways of eating an Oreo cookie.

=== Film ===
Year	Title	Role	Notes
2002	Shadow Realm	Sandra McLennan	TV movie
2001	After Image	Laura	
1998	Legalese	Carol Appler	TV movie
1994	Natural Born Killers	Julie	
1991	Listen Carefully	Christa	

=== Television ===
Year	Title	Role	Notes
2007	Saving Grace	Woman on Bench	Episode: "This is Way Too Normal for You"
2005	Veronica Mars	Mary Mooney	Episode: My Mother, the Fiend
2003	Angel	Deaf Woman	Episode: The Magic Bullet
2002	Night Visions	Sandra McClinnon	Episode: Voices
1999	Once and Again	Bookstore Woman	Episode: The Gingerbread House
1999	ER	Gwen's Mother	Episode: Nobody Doesn't Like Amanda Lee
1998	Pacific Blue	Tara	Episode: Broken Dreams
1992	Doogie Howser, M.D.	Julia Myatt	Episode: Doogie, Can You Hear Me?
1987–1990	Beauty and the Beast	Laura Williams	Recurring role (4 episodes)
1987	Cagney & Lacey	Michelle Bennet	Episode: Right to Remain Silent

== Awards and recognition ==
- 2013, received a $2,500 grant from Deafhood Foundation for her educational website "Clerc's Children"
- 1997, Best Performance, Dramalogue for Sweet Nothing in My Ear
- 1996, Christopher Reeve Scholarship, The Valdez Award (Drama)
- 1994, "Woman of the Year" in recognition of her achievements as an equal rights advocate by the city of Los Angeles

== See also ==
- Official website
- Terrylene Sacchetti at IMDb
- http://www.clercschildren.com/
- ASL Oreo commercial on YouTube with Terrylene and her son
