= List of Philippine co-produced films and television series =

This is a list of international co-produced Philippine films and television series .

The first film co-produced by a Philippine film studio with a studio based outside the Philippines is Rodrigo de Villa. The film was produced with Indonesian film outfit Persari.

Excluded in this list are works with a foreign cast (such as Ignacio de Loyola) which had primarily Spanish actors but was produced only by a Philippine-based studio, works which were adaptations of foreign media, and media produced solely by foreign production companies that are set in the Philippines and despite including Filipinos in its cast (such as Metro Manila), and Voltes V: Legacy which was produced by GMA Network but licensed and supervised by Toei.

== Films ==
Title	Year	Director (Note: Filipino national unless otherwise stated)	Production studios (Note: Local or Philippine-based unless otherwise stated)	Genre	Source
Rodrigo de Villa (Note: Done in two versions, one with an Indonesian cast and the other a Filipino cast.)	1952	Rempo Urip (Indonesia); Gregorio Fernandez	Persari (Indonesia); LVN Studio	Historical drama	
Holiday in Bali	1962	Misbach Yusa Biran (Indonesia); Tony Cayado	Persari (Indonesia); Sampaguita Pictures	Romantic drama	
Warbus	1985	Ted Kaplan (Italy)	Amerinda Est (Italy); Regal Films	Action	
Goodbye America	1997	Thierry Notz (United States)	Quantum Entertainment (United States); ABS-CBN Entertainment	Action drama	
Legacy	1998	T.J. Scott (Canada)	Quantum Entertainment (United States); Chrome Pegasus Productions(United States); ABS-CBN Entertainment	Action	
Doomsdayer	2000	Michael John Sarna (United States)	Quantum Entertainment (United States); ABS-CBN Entertainment	Action	
American Adobo	2002	Laurice Guillen	Outrider Pictures (United States); Star Cinema, Unitel Pictures	Comedy-Drama	
Captive	2012	Brillante Mendoza	Swift Entertainment Production (France); Centerstage Production	Drama	
Blood in Dispute	2015	Ken Simpson (Canada)	Phum Pich Films (Cambodia); Cambodian Television Network (Cambodia); GMA Network	Drama	
A Lullaby to the Sorrowful Mystery	2016	Lav Diaz	Potocol (Singapore); Akanga Film Productions (Singapore); Ten17 Productions; Sine Olivia Pilipinas; Epicmedia	Historical fantasy	
When the Waves Are Gone	2022	Lav Diaz	Snowglobe (Denmark); Rosa Filmes (Portugal); Epicmedia	Heist	
Plan 75	2022	Chie Hayakawa (Japan)	Happinet Pictures, Loaded Films, Dongyu Club (Japan); Fusee, Daluyong Studios; Urban Factory (France)	Drama	
Nocebo	2022	Lorcan Finnegan (Ireland)	Epicmedia; RLJE Films (United States); XYZ Films (United States); Lovely Productions (Ireland); Wild Swim Films (United Kingdom)	Thriller	
Viet and Nam	2024	Minh Quý Trương(Vietnam)	Epicmedia; Cinema Inutile (United States)	Drama	
Filipiñana	2026	Rafael Manuel	Film4 (United Kingdom)Potocol (Singapore) Epicmedia; Easy Riders Films (France); Idle Eye (Netherlands)	Comedy drama	
Silenced Nights	2026	Lawrence Fajardo	Quantum Films; House on Fire International (Taiwan); House on Fire (France)	Political drama	
Diamond		Andy Garcia	Black Cap Pictures	Noir	

== Television series ==
Title	Year	Director	Production studios	Genre	Source
Sesame!	1983	Kokoy Jimenez	Philippine Children's Television Foundation; Children's Television Workshop (Note: Only during its first year of production.) (United States)	Educational; Puppetry	
Kahit Isang Saglit (Note: Earned a nomination at the 37th International Emmy Awards.)	2008	Gilbert Perez	ABS-CBN; Double Vision (Malaysia)	Romance drama	
Barangay 143	2018	Jyotirmoy Saha (Singapore)	Synergy88; TV Asahi (Japan); August Media Holdings (Singapore)	Animation; Sport	
Almost Paradise	2020	Francis dela Torre; Hannah Espia; Marc Roskin (United States)	ABS-CBN Entertainment; Electric Entertainment (United States)	Crime	
