= Beauty and the Beast (1987 TV series) =

American fantasy drama television series (1987–1990)

- Genre: Fantasy drama Crime drama Legal drama
- Created by: Ron Koslow
- Based on: Beauty and the Beast by Jeanne-Marie Leprince de Beaumont
- Written by: Alex Gansa; Howard Gordon; David Peckinpah; George R. R. Martin
- Starring: Linda Hamilton; Ron Perlman; Roy Dotrice; Jay Acovone; Ren Woods; Jo Anderson; Edward Albert; Stephen McHattie
- Composers: Lee Holdridge; Don Davis; William Ross
- Country of origin: United States
- No. of seasons: 3
- No. of episodes: 56 (list of episodes)

Production
- Executive producers: Ron Koslow; Paul Junger Witt; Tony Thomas; Stephen Kurzfield
- Running time: approx. 48 minutes (per episode)
- Production companies: Witt/Thomas Productions; Republic Pictures

Original release
- Network: CBS
- Release: September 25, 1987 – August 4, 1990

Related
- Beauty & the Beast (2012)

Beauty and the Beast is an American fantasy drama television series that first aired on CBS from September 25, 1987, to August 4, 1990. Creator Ron Koslow's updated version of the fairy tale has a double focus: the relationship between Vincent (Ron Perlman), a mythic, noble man-beast, and Catherine (Linda Hamilton), a savvy Assistant District Attorney in New York City, as well as a secret utopian community of social outcasts living in a subterranean sanctuary. Through an empathic bond, Vincent senses Catherine's emotions and becomes her guardian.

== Premise ==
The series follows the developing relationship between the main characters and explores the division between New York City and a hidden, subterranean world. In a twist on the original fairy tale, however, the "beast" does not transform into society’s ideal of beauty after winning Catherine’s love. Instead, Vincent’s inner beauty remains the defining feature of his character, while Catherine’s life is transformed by her relationship with him.

In the third season, after Catherine's death, Jo Anderson became the new female lead playing Diana Bennett, a criminal profiler investigating Catherine's murder.

== Production ==
As the title indicates, the premise of the series is inspired by the fairy tale "Beauty and the Beast"; in particular, there is some connection to Jean Cocteau's 1946 French film, La Belle et la Bête.

George R. R. Martin, who would go on to write the A Song of Ice and Fire book series which was later adapted into the acclaimed television series Game of Thrones, was a writer and producer on the show.

In 2004 and 2007, Beauty and the Beast was ranked #14 and #17, respectively, on TV Guide's Top Cult Shows Ever.

== Series synopsis ==
=== Season 1 ===
Catherine Chandler (played by Linda Hamilton) is abducted, beaten, slashed and left to die in Central Park because she was inadvertently mistaken for a woman named Carol Stabler. She is rescued and cared for by Vincent (played by Ron Perlman) who has taken her to Father (played by Roy Dotrice), head of a hidden community of people dwelling in tunnels below the city of New York. Ten days later, Catherine returns to the surface with the promise of keeping Vincent's secret and the challenge to go on after her terrible attack. After completing her recovery, her life begins a serious transition: she takes self-defense lessons, leaves her comfortable job at her father's law firm and joins the Manhattan District Attorney's office as an assistant district attorney. Her first action involves her asking Carol Stabler about those men who attacked her, where she states that they were part of an illegal escort service run by Martin Belmont. When Martin Belmont's men attacked Catherine, Vincent saves her and mauls the men.

During the course of the first season, the production team fashioned a blend of romance and crime drama, which used both Catherine's position as an ADA and her will to help Vincent and his world to place her in moments of physical danger that would bring the idealized romantic figure of Vincent to the surface world as her guardian angel.

=== Season 2 ===
During its second season, the series shifted its focus slightly to add more character development, as the central characters spent considerable time exploring their relationships with the inhabitants of the Tunnel World, where Catherine had finally been accepted as a friend and "Helper" (someone who assists the Tunnel community with what they need to survive and by keeping their secret). More people from the World Above turned up for emotional support and healing in the secure environment of the World Below.

Near the end of the season, however, in an effort to boost faltering ratings, the action orientation returned as a result of the misleadings of the recurrent villain Paracelsus (played by Tony Jay). In a cliffhanger final episode, Catherine is seen walking down a tunnel into a chamber, where Vincent is suffering from a violent madness.

=== Season 3 ===
When the series returned for its abbreviated third season late in 1989, Linda Hamilton had announced her decision to leave the series as she was pregnant at the time. It was a decision that, along with the network's desire to attract more male viewers, would have serious repercussions for the show's continued survival. In the resolution to the previous season's cliffhanger, Catherine rescued Vincent from his inner demons but was kidnapped by a man named Gabriel (played by Stephen McHattie), the ruthless head of a huge criminal empire she had been investigating, which was trying to corrupt the D.A.'s office. She was killed, but not before giving birth to Vincent's son, who was held hostage by the evil Gabriel. Catherine's boss and close friend Joe Maxwell (Jay Acovone) hired Diana Bennett (Jo Anderson), a criminal profiler with the police department, to track down Catherine's killer. Quite naturally, her investigation ultimately led her to the now darkly obsessed and grieving Vincent.

Although still popular with its dedicated fans, the darker, more resolutely violent aspects of the reworked concept, coupled with the fatal loss of the all-important central relationship between Catherine and Vincent, led to further declining ratings and, ultimately, cancellation.

== Characters ==
=== Main cast ===
Pictured: Linda Hamilton (Catherine), Ron Perlman (Vincent)

- Catherine Chandler (portrayed by Linda Hamilton) – A corporate attorney in her father's law firm. After she was abducted, beaten and her face slashed upon being mistaken for Carol Stabler, Catherine was rescued and tended to by Vincent. After that experience, Catherine changes her life completely and becomes an investigator for the Manhattan District Attorney's Office. In Season Three, Catherine becomes pregnant with Vincent's child and is captured by Gabriel. She is later murdered by Gabriel who has his "tame" doctor overdose her with morphine.
- Vincent (portrayed by Ron Perlman) – A man of extremely large build with the facial characteristics of a lion, such as fanged teeth, a flattened nose, a feline muzzle and fingers tipped with claw-like nails. He is also much stronger than normal humans and when enraged, he growls and roars like a lion. He wears a hooded cloak to hide his appearance from strangers while walking the city streets at night. His parentage is unknown as he was found as a baby near St Vincent's Hospital and brought to Jacob Wells by Paracelsus' wife, Anna. Vincent has empathic abilities that let him know when Catherine is in danger. Following Catherine's death, his newborn son was captive in the clutches of Gabriel prompting him to take down Gabriel's operations. He does end up surrendering to Gabriel when he hears that his son is ill. This leads up to a rescue mission by Diana and the rest of the "World Below". Following Gabriel's death, Vincent saves his son and names him after his foster father, Jacob. Vincent's makeup was devised by veteran Hollywood makeup artist Rick Baker. It was Baker who brought up Perlman based on his previous experiences in prosthetics and fought hard for his casting which ultimately started a long-lasting friendship between the two. Matt McColm was a stunt double for Perlman.
- Diana Bennett (portrayed by Jo Anderson) – Diana is a criminal profiler with the "210 Division" of the New York City Police Department, which investigates unusual cases beyond the scope of the normal police. She debuted in Season 3, where she was called to investigate Catherine's murder. She later becomes a friend of the "World Below" and plays a part in the final battle against Gabriel, fatally shooting him with Catherine's gun.

=== "World Above" ===
- Joe Maxwell (portrayed by Jay Acovone) – A Deputy District attorney for the Borough of Manhattan and Catherine's immediate superior in the office. In Season Three, Joe is injured in a car explosion caused by Gabriel's crime syndicate. After Catherine's and District Attorney John Moreno's death, Joe becomes Acting District Attorney and hires Diana Bennett to find her killer. Joe later meets Jacob Wells when it comes to tracking down Gabriel, but he never meets Vincent.
- Isaac Stubbs (portrayed by Ron O'Neal in "Once Upon a Time", Delroy Lindo in "Terrible Savior" and "No Way Down") – A street-fighting instructor who teaches Catherine to defend herself after she recovers from her attack.
- Jenny Aronson (portrayed by Terri Hanauer) – A friend of Catherine's.
- Edie (portrayed by Ren Woods) – Works in the computer division of the DA's office in Season 1.
- Elliot Burch (portrayed by Edward Albert) – A self-made millionaire and New York building developer who is in love with Catherine. In Season Three, Elliot becomes familiar with Vincent after an encounter with him. Due to a deal with Gabriel, Elliot is involved in a plot to kill Vincent on his boat. Elliot is presumably killed by the boat explosion which wounded Vincent.
- Charles Chandler (portrayed by John McMartin) – Catherine's father who is seen in Season 1 and 2 where he runs a law firm that Catherine used to work at. He dies of a stroke in the episode "Orphans". Before Charles died, Catherine was able to have Vincent meet her father.
- Laura Williams (portrayed by Terrylene Sacchetti) – A deaf girl who lived in "The World Below" and struggles living in "The World Above" while remaining a helper to her tunnel family and befriending Catherine whom she admires.
- Devin Wells (portrayed by Bruce Abbott) – A former inhabitant of "The World Below" who grew up with Vincent where they had a brother-like relationship.
- Dr. Peter Alcott (portrayed by Joseph Campanella) – A "Helper" who is a fellow medical student and old friend of Jacob Wells. In "Dead of Winter", Peter is among the "Helpers" that attend Winterfest.
- John Moreno (portrayed by Bill Marcus) – The District Attorney that Catherine Chandler and Joe Maxwell work for. In Season Three, it is revealed that he is one of Gabriel's minions and betrays Catherine. He is later killed by Vincent in self-defense while trying to kill both Vincent and Elliot Burch.
- Gabriel (portrayed by Stephen McHattie) – A highly-influential crime boss and the biggest drug trafficker on the East Coast, who debuted in Season 3 as a recurring antagonist. He was responsible for Catherine's death and the kidnapping of her new-born son, Jacob. After Gabriel's men captured Diana, Vincent surrendered himself to Gabriel's men. In the final battle, Vincent's son is rescued as Vincent wounds Gabriel. After Gabriel mentions that no court would be able to convict him, Diana avenges Catherine's death by killing him with Catherine's gun.
  - Jonathan Pope (portrayed by John Lehne) – Gabriel's right-hand man, who issues out Gabriel's orders.
  - Doctor (portrayed by Kenneth Kimmins) – An unnamed doctor, who works for Gabriel. He forced the doctor to inject Catherine with a fatal dose of morphine after she gave birth to Vincent's son, Jacob. When Gabriel revealed this to Vincent at the time when he was his prisoner, he offered Vincent vengeance on the doctor (even though the doctor had stated to Vincent that Gabriel had forced him do it). Vincent was unable to take the doctor's life, causing Gabriel to have one of his men shoot the doctor as Gabriel says to Vincent, "I always pay my debts".

=== "World Below" ===
- Jacob Wells/Father (portrayed by Roy Dotrice) – The patriarch of the "World Below" and Vincent's foster father. A physician who left the "World Above" after being unjustly blacklisted, fired from his job and having his license to practice medicine stripped from him, Jacob found sanctuary in an early tunnel community and became its leader. He was also the one who helped Vincent heal Catherine after Martin Belmont's men attacked her.
- Mary (portrayed by Ellen Geer) – The matriarch and midwife of the "World Below". Befitting her position, she is very motherly and generous. Mary is particularly devoted to giving back to the "Helpers".
- Mouse (portrayed by David Greenlee) – Apparently having no other name, at least none that he remembers, he is a young tunnel dweller who originally hid from the "World Below" community, until Vincent caught him stealing some food and invited him into their family. He is infamous for stealing from the "World Above", which in his opinion, exists for no other reason than to be stolen from as he once commented "Everyone takes things from Up Top. It's what Up Top is there for". Mouse loves tinkering with machinery and has invented several "gizmos" to help his fellow tunnel dwellers. He has a pet raccoon, named Arthur.
- Pascal (portrayed by Armin Shimerman) – The shy and gentle "pipe master" who is the supervisor of the tunnels' communication system that involves the inhabitants of "The World Below" speaking through banging on the pipes. He was born in the "World Below" and was trained into understanding morse code by his father.
- Winslow (portrayed by James Avery) – A very influential member of the underground community and a member of Jacob Wells' council. Winslow is a blacksmith by trade. When on a rescue mission with Vincent to save Catherine from Paracelsus in "To Reign in Hell", Winslow is killed by Paracelsus' minion Erlik, who threw Winslow against the wall.
- Geoffrey (portrayed by Philip Waller) – A young boy who lives in the "World Below".
- Jamie (portrayed by Irina Irvine) – A teenage girl who lives in the "World Below". She is particularly protective of Mouse, defending his often erratic behavior to their elders. In "To Reign in Hell", Jamie is shown to be skillful with a crossbow when she uses it in a fight with Paracelsus' minion Erlik.
- Narcissa (portrayed by Beah Richards) – An elderly and nearly blind inhabitant of the "World Below", she has resided there at least as far back as Vincent's childhood. Narcissa eventually moved far from the other inhabitants into the furthest tunnels where few others venture and even Vincent's knowledge of these areas does not surpass her own. She pretends to be nothing more than a senile old woman, but she is actually a skilled magician and fortune teller.
- Rebecca (portrayed Kathryn Spitz) – A female inhabitant of the "World Below" and an expert candlestick maker.
- William (portrayed by Ritch Brinkley) – A heavyset man and inhabitant of the "World Below" who serves as their cook. His experiences in the "World Above" left him bitter and suspicious of almost everyone. William's role as cook makes him feel needed and appreciated as the "World Above" never did and he is usually the first to suggest a violent response to any threat to the "World Below".
- John Pater/Paracelsus (portrayed by Tony Jay) – An inhabitant of the "World Below" who was featured in Season 1 and 2 as a recurring antagonist. John Pater was a scientist and a former friend of Jacob Wells' who helped organize the "World Below". But when he eventually desired power for himself, the community was forced to exile him. Jacob describes him as a "philosopher, scientist, magician" like the real Paracelsus, the name John eventually takes for himself. When Jacob tries to reason with Paracelsus by calling him by his real name, he commented "John is dead". Paracelsus' late wife, Anna was the one who had discovered the infant Vincent near St. Vincent's Hospital and brought him to Jacob. Paracelsus tried to lead Vincent to siding with him while disguised as Jacob, Vincent ultimately kills him in a fit of rage. In his dying breath, Paracelsus quotes "At last, you are my son".

== Nielsen ratings ==
- 1987–88: #51, 13.1 rating
- 1988–89: #65, 10.4 rating
- 1989–90: #68, 9.5 rating

== Novelizations ==
- Avon Books published three books novelizing various episodes from the series:
  - Beauty and the Beast by Barbara Hambly – October 1989 – ISBN 0-380-75795-8, a novelization and expanding of the pilot episode
  - Masques by Ru Emerson – September 1990 – ISBN 0-380-76194-7, a novelization of the episodes "Arabesque", "Masques" and "The Watcher"
  - Song of Orpheus by Barbara Hambly – November 1990 – ISBN 0-380-75798-2, a novelization of the episodes "Fever", "Song of Orpheus" and "Shades of Grey"
- Image Pub of New York published another book based on episodes and characters from the series:
  - Beyond Words, Beyond Silence by Nan Dibble – January 1993 – ISBN 9992999292
- First Comics published two graphic novels based on the series written and illustrated by Wendy Pini:
  - "Portrait of Love" – June 1989 – ISBN 0915419505
  - "Night of Beauty" – April 1990 – ISBN 0915419750
- In 1993, Innovation Publishing published six issues of a comic book series based on the series.

== Home media ==
CBS DVD (distributed by Paramount) has released all three seasons of Beauty and the Beast on DVD in region 1. They also released Beauty and the Beast: The Complete Series, a 16-disc box set featuring all 56 episodes of the series.

On 11 November 2014, CBS Home Entertainment released a repackaged version of the complete series set which featured a lower price but did not include the bonus disc that was part of the original complete series set.

Fabulous Films has released the entire series on DVD in region 2.

Shock Entertainment has released the entire series on DVD in region 4.

DVD name	Ep #	Region 1	Region 2	Region 4
Beauty and the Beast: The Complete First Season	22	13 February 2007	30 May 2011	20 April 2009
Beauty and the Beast: The Complete Second Season	22	10 July 2007	27 June 2011	10 September 2009
Beauty and the Beast: The Complete Third Season	12	5 February 2008	25 July 2011	10 February 2010
Beauty and the Beast: The Complete Series	56	30 September 2008	25 July 2011	14 April 2010

A Blu-ray release in region 2 was announced for March 2011, but was canceled.

== Fandom ==
An active fan community (self-titled "Helpers" or "the tunnel community") arose during the show's run, helping organize a petition drive to assure that there would be a third season. They have published fanzines, fan fiction and collections of filk music inspired by the show, and as of 2013 continue to hold various fan conventions around the world.

== Reboot ==
CBS Television Studios, which owns the rights to the series, developed a reboot for the series. It was executive produced by Ron Koslow, the creator of the original, along with the earlier show's producers, Paul Junger Witt and Tony Thomas. The reboot has been described as a "modern-day romantic love story with a procedural twist". In Canada, it aired on Showcase and the United States, aired on The CW.

The television series starred New Zealand actor Jay Ryan as Vincent (the "beast") and Canadian actress Kristin Kreuk as Catherine (the "beauty"). The pilot was filmed in Toronto, Ontario, Canada in March 2012.
