= Cinema of the Philippines =

The cinema of the Philippines (Note: Filipino: Pelikulang Pilipino, from Spanish película, meaning "movie" or "film") began with the introduction of the first moving pictures to the country on January 1, 1897, at the Salón de Pertierra in Manila. The following year, local scenes were shot on film for the first time by a Spaniard, Antonio Ramos, using the Lumiere Cinematograph. While most early filmmakers and producers in the country were mostly wealthy enterprising foreigners and expatriates, on September 12, 1919, Dalagang Bukid (Country Maiden), a film based on a popular zarzuela, was the first movie made and shown by Filipino filmmaker José Nepomuceno. Dubbed as the "Father of Philippine Cinema," his work marked the start of cinema as an art form in the Philippines.

Even with the problems currently facing motion pictures around the world, films are still considered one of the popular forms of entertainment among the Filipino people, directly employing some 260,000 Filipinos and generating around ₱2 billion revenues annually. Among its neighbors in Southeast Asia, Philippine cinema remains as the strongest in the Southeast Asian region with the majority of films made in the region came from the Philippines along with the film industries of Thailand and Indonesia.

The Film Development Council of the Philippines established a national film archive in October 2011. Furthermore, their annually held Luna Awards honor the outstanding Filipino films as voted by their own peers. Meanwhile, the Manunuri ng Pelikulang Pilipino hands out the Gawad Urian Awards, which is well known due to its credible choices of winners.

== Overview ==
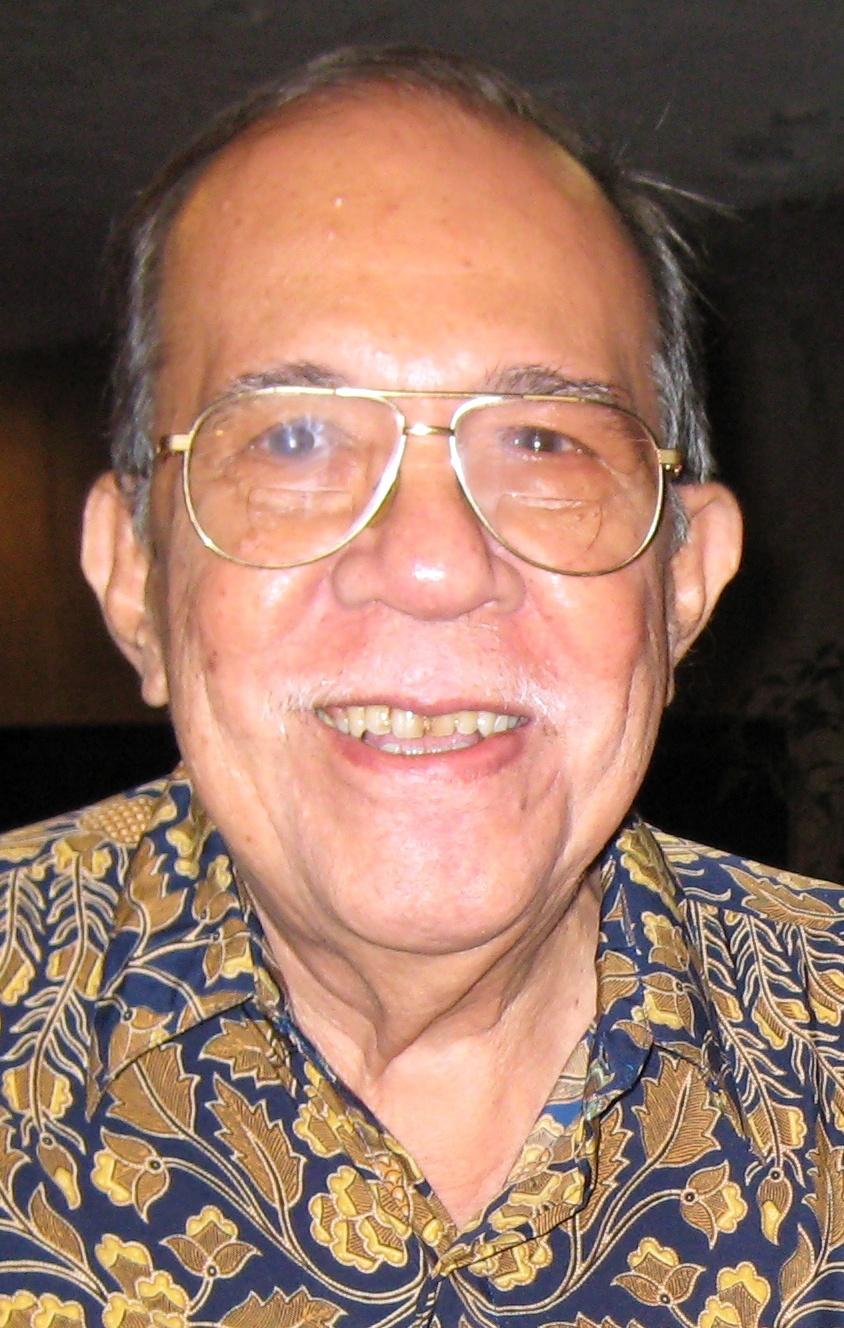
Eddie Romero - renowned Filipino film director, producer and screenwriter.

The formative years of Philippine cinema, starting from the 1930s, were a time of discovering the film genre as a new medium of art. Scripts and characterisations in films came from popular theatre and familiar local literature. Nationalistic films were also quite popular, although they were labeled as being too subversive.

The 1940s and the war brought to the Philippine cinema the consciousness of reality. Movie themes consisting primarily of war and heroism had proven to be a huge hit among local audiences.

Cinema of the Philippines
- No. of screens: 920 (2018)
  - Per capita: 0.9 per 100,000 (2013)
- Main distributors: Star Cinema 27.1% UIP 17.0% Disney 16.1%

Produced feature films (2013)
- Total: 53

Number of admissions (2014)
- Total: 78,300,000
  - Per capita: 0.8

Gross box office (2017)
- Total: $218 million

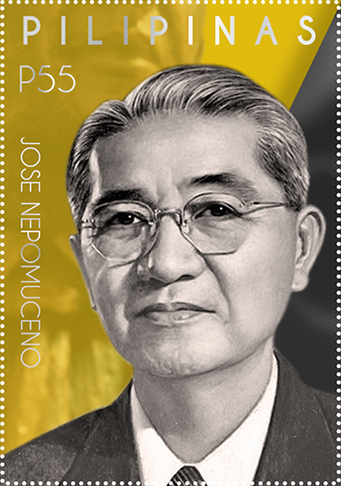
José Nepomuceno, pioneer film maker

The 1950s saw the first golden age of Philippine cinema, with the emergence of more artistic and mature films, and significant improvement in cinematic techniques among filmmakers. The studio system produced frenetic activity in the local film industry, as many films were made annually and several local talents started to earn recognition abroad. Award-giving bodies were first instituted during this period. When the decade was drawing to a close, the studio system monopoly came under siege as a result of labor-management conflicts, and by the 1960s, the artistry established in the previous years was already on the decline. This era can be characterized by rampant commercialism, fan movies, soft porn films, action flicks, and western spin-offs.

The 1970s and 1980s were turbulent years for the industry, bringing both positive and negative changes. The films in this period now dealt with more serious topics following the Martial Law era. In addition, action and sex films developed further, introducing more explicit subject matter. These years also brought the arrival of alternative or independent film in the Philippines.

The 1990s saw the emerging popularity of slasher movies, teen-oriented romantic comedies, as well as sexually explicit adult films, although slapstick comedies still draw a large audience. Genres of previous decades had been recycled with almost the same stories, and love teams, which had been popular in the past, have reemerged.

The Philippines, which as one of Asia's oldest film industries, remains undisputed in terms of the highest level of theater admission in Southeast Asia. Over the years, however, the film industry has registered a steady decline in movie viewership from 131 million in 1996 to 63 million in 2004. From a high of 200 films a year during the 1980s, the country's film industry was down to making a total of 56 new films in 2006 and around 30 in 2007. Although the industry has undergone turbulent times, the 21st century saw the rebirth of independent filmmaking through the use of digital technology, and a number of films have once again earned international recognition and prestige.

== History ==
=== Origins and early development ===
On January 1, 1897, the first film shown was Espectaculo Scientifico and followed by other four movies, namely, Un Homme Au Chapeau (Man with a Hat), Une scène de danse japonnaise (Scene from a Japanese Dance), Les Boxers (The Boxers), and La Place de L' Opéra (The Place L' Opéra), were shown via 60 mm Gaumont Chrono-photograph projector at the Salon de Pertierra at No.12 Escolta in Manila. The venue was formerly known as on the ground floor of the Casino Español at Pérez Street, off Escolta Street. Other countries, such as France, England, and Germany had their claims to the introduction of publicly projected motion picture in the Philippines, although Pertierra is credited by most historians and critics.

Antonio Ramos, a Spanish soldier from Aragón, was able to import a Lumiere Cinematograph from Paris, including 30 film titles, out of his savings and the financial banking of two Swiss entrepreneurs, Liebman and Peritz.

By August 1897, Liebman and Peritz presented the first movies on the Lumiere Cinematograph in Manila. The cinema was set up at Escolta Street at the corner of San Jacinto Street. A test preview was presented to a limited number of guests on August 28 and the inaugural show was presented to the general public the next day, August 29, 1897. Documentary films showing recent events as well as natural calamities in Europe were shown.

During the first three weeks, Ramos had a selection of ten different films to show, but by the fourth week, he was forced to shuffle the 30 films in various combinations to produce new programs. These were four viewing sessions, every hour on the hour, from 6:00 P.M. to 10:00 P.M. After three months, attendance began to slacken for failure to show any new features. They transferred the viewing hall to a warehouse in Plaza Goiti and reduced the admission fees. By the end of November, the movie hall closed down.

The next year, to attract patronage, using the Lumiere as a camera, Ramos locally filmed Panorama de Manila (Manila landscape), Fiesta de Quiapo (Quiapo Fiesta), Puente de España (Bridge of Spain), and Escenas Callejeras (Street scenes), making him the first movie producer in the Philippines. Aside from Ramos, there were other foreigners who left documentary evidences of their visits to the Philippines. Burton Holmes, father of the travelogue, who made the first of several visits in 1899, made the Battle of Baliwag; Kimwood Peters shot the Banawe Rice Terraces; and, Raymond Ackerman of American Biography and Mutoscope filmed Filipino Cockfight and the Battle of Mt. Arayat.

=== American period ===
Film showing in the Philippines resumed in 1900 when a British entrepreneur named Walgrah opened the Cine Walgrah at No.60 Calle Santa Rosa in Intramuros. The second movie house was opened in 1902 by a Spanish entrepreneur, Samuel Rebarber, who called his building, Gran Cinematógrafo Parisino, located at No. 80 Calle Crespo in Quiapo. In 1903, José Jiménez, a stage backdrop painter, set up the first Filipino-owned movie theater, the Cinematograpo Rizal in Azcarraga Street (now C.M. Recto Ave.), in front of the Tutuban Railway Station. In the same year, a movie market was formally created in the country along with the arrival of silent movies and American colonialism. The silent films were always accompanied by gramophone, a piano, or a quartet, or when Caviria was shown at the Manila Grand Opera House, a 200-man choir.

In 1905, Herbert Wyndham, shot scenes at the Manila Fire Department; Albert Yearsley shot the Rizal Day Celebration in Luneta 1909; in 1910, the Manila Carnival; in 1911, the Eruption of Mayon Volcano; the first Airplane Flight Over Manila by Bud Mars and the Fires of Tondo, Pandacan and Paco; and, in 1912, the Departure of the Igorots to Barcelona and the Typhoon in Cebu. These novelty films, however, did not capture the hearts of the audience because they were about the foreigners.

The Philippine Commission recognized early the potential of cinema as a tool of communication and information, so that in 1909, the Bureau of Science bought a complete film-making unit and laboratory from Pathé, and sent its chief photographer, the American, Charles Martin, to France to train for a year. When Martin completed his training, he resolved to document, in motion pictures, the varied aspects of the Philippines.

In 1910, the first picture with sound reached Manila, using the Chronophone. A British film crew also visited the Philippines, and filmed, among other scenes, the Pagsanjan Falls (Oriental) in 1911 in kinemacolor. In 1912, New York and Hollywood film companies started to establish their own agencies in Manila to distribute films. In the same year, two American entrepreneurs made a film about the execution of Jose Rizal, and aroused a strong curiosity among Filipino moviegoers. This led to the making of the first Filipino film, La vida de Jose Rizal.

By 1914, the US colonial government was already using films as a vehicle for information, education, propaganda and entertainment. The Bureau of Science tackled subjects designed to present an accurate picture of the Philippines before the American public, particularly the US Congress. By 1915, the best European and American films were shown in Philippine theaters. When World War I (1914–1918) choked off the production of European studios, Manila theater managers turned to US for new film products. With the variety they offered, American films quickly dominated the Philippine film market.

The first film produced by a Filipino is José Nepomuceno's Dalagang Bukid (Country Maiden) in 1919 based on a highly acclaimed musical play by Hermogenes Ilagan and León Ignacio. Early filmmakers, even with meager capital, followed some of the genres provided by Hollywood movies. The main sources of movie themes during this period were theater pieces from popular dramas or zarzuelas. Another source of movie themes at that time was Philippine literature.

During the 1920s when the Germans and Russians dominated the artistic development of the film and its techniques (Examples are The Cabinet of Dr. Caligari – 1919, Nosferatu – 1922, and Battleship Potemkin – 1925), Filipino-Visayan filmmakers such as Max Borromeo, Florentino Borromeo and Celestino Rodriguez collaborated in making El Hijo Disobediente (The Disobedient Son) in 1922. This black and white silent picture could have been one of the earliest noted films from the Southern Philippines. The year 1929 marked the advent of talking pictures, but only in 1938 did the Visayan Film Industry have its first "talkie" entitle Bertoldo Ug Balodoy (Bertoldo and Balodoy) written by Piux Kabahar, which was followed by Mini (Fake; 1940), and Gugmang Talagsaon (Rare Love; 1940) by Virgilio Gonzales. In Cebu, the first movie houses were built by the Avila Clan: Ideal Theater (1911), Cine Auditorium (1922) and Cine Oriente (The old Teatro Junquera). Films have already been showing outside of Manila as early as 1897 through the feats of Señor Pertierra, a Spanish expatriate and a certain Englishman going only with the surname of 'Bischoff'. Mr. Bischoff was the first to show films in Iloilo in 1903. These were short features produced by the film company Cinematographo Pastor and were screened nightly from 6:30 to 9:30 in Bischoff's bodega or camarin in Calle Real. Later on, other film companies have also begun to rise such as Cinematografo Insular (which arrived from Manila to Iloilo in 1905), Cinematografo Teatro Colón and Cinematografo Parsien. To coincide with the rising of such film companies, there came the establishment of movie houses in Iloilo. In 1919, one highlighted event that stood out from that decade was the showing of the first full-length Tagalog feature film in Iloilo: Jose Nepomuceno's Dalagang Bukid (literal translation from Tagalog: 'mountain girl'). Thousands of Ilonggo film buffs went to see the movie and were highly moved by it. In Iloilo, Teatro Malhabour touted as the first cinema or movie house in Iloilo was opened to the public on July 3, 1908, at the corner of Calle Quiñones (now Mabini) and Calle Concepcion (now Ledesma). It was owned by Felix Malhabour, a policeman and a member of the board of the Iglesia Filipina Independiente. Other early cinema or movies houses in Iloilo City include the Rex Theater, Roxy Theater, Republic Theater and Cine Commonwealth built around 1910s–1920s. The two prominent or popular cinema houses in Iloilo include the oldest still existing and operating movie theater in Iloilo, Cine Palace and the now defunct Cine Eagle both built in 1928.

In 1929, the Syncopation, the first American sound film, was shown in Radio theater in Plaza Santa Cruz in Manila inciting a competition on who could make the first talkie among local producers. On December 8, 1932, a film in Tagalog entitled Ang Aswang (The Aswang), a monster movie inspired by Philippine folklore, was promoted as the first sound film. Moviegoers who remembered the film attested that it was not a completely sound film. José Nepomuceno's Punyal Na Guinto (Golden Dagger), which premiered on March 9, 1933, at the Lyric theater, was credited as the first completely sound, all-talking picture in the country.

In the 1930s, a few film artists and producers deviated from the norms and presented sociopolitical films. Ironically, the people who helped the film industry develop and flourish were also the same people who suppressed its artistic expression by inhibiting movie themes that would establish radical political views among the Filipinos. Instead, love and reconciliation between members of different classes of people were encouraged as themes. Julian Manansala’s film Patria Amor (Beloved Country) was almost suppressed because of its anti-Spanish sentiments.

Carmen Concha, one of the first female directors in the country, also ventured into filmmaking, and she directed Magkaisang Landas and Yaman ng Mahirap in 1939 under Parlatone, and Pangarap in 1940 under LVN.

Despite fierce competition with Hollywood films, the Filipino film industry survived and flourished. When the 1930s drew to a close, the Filipino film industry was well established, and local movie stars acquired huge followers.

Some popular movie stars of the pre-WWII era include:

- Carmen Rosales (1917–1991)
- Angel Esmeralda (1915–1985)
- Ben Rubio (1917–1980)
- Fely Vallejo (1917–2013)
- Exequiel Segovia
- Yolanda Marquez (1920–2009)
- Teddy Benavides
- Manuel Barbeyto (1902–1979)
- Ernesto la Guardia
- Rogelio dela Rosa (1916–1986)
- Rudy Concepcion (1915–1940)
- Alfonso Carvajal
- Elsa Oria (1916–1995)
- Rosario Moreno (1916–1945)
- Andrés Centenera (1914–1983)
- Tita Duran (1929–1991)
- Fernando Poe (1916–1951)
- Corazon Noble (1918–2001)
- Monang Carvajal (1898–1980)
- Mila del Sol (1923–2020)
- Rosa del Rosario (1917–2006)
- Ely Ramos (1911–1972)

=== World War II and Japanese occupation ===
During the Japanese Occupation, filmmaking was suddenly put to a halt. As was the case in Japan's other colonial and occupied film markets, Japanese film companies took over the local exhibition venues replacing films from the Hollywood and the region with Japanese films for propaganda. Japanese films had been imported into the Philippines since the late 1930s but without great success. Japanese-sponsored film production in the Philippines continued until 1945 but was limited mostly to newsreels and educational films.

Although the Philippines never became a center for feature film production under the Japanese, it was a strategically important market for Japan. First, unlike Manchuria, where the Japanese literally had to construct a film industry, the Philippines already had many large, well-equipped motion picture theaters that were well-stocked with significant Hollywood product. Many confiscated films were exported back to Japan to train its filmmakers. Production facilities were better in the Philippines than any other market in the Japanese empire with the exception of Shanghai. This was another reason why such Japanese film companies as the Nanyo Film Association (南洋映画協会) and Film Distributors (映画配給者) each established branch offices in Manila in 1942. Further, due to the long period of American influence, the local film community boasted a significant number of people who had worked in Hollywood during the silent era and had considerable experience.

In 1944, Toho Studios sent director Abe Yutaka to Manila to produce the first of what would be the only two feature films to be entirely shot on location by the Japanese. Ano hata o ute (あの旗を撃て) aka Dawn of Freedom told the story of the Japanese victory at the Battle of Corregidor and the U.S. military's hasty retreat from the islands. The film presented the Japanese as Asian liberators who came to free the Filipinos from decades of colonial oppression that began with the Spanish and continued with the Americans. The film was shot in Japanese, Tagalog, and English and was written for the screen by Tsutomo Sawamura, co-directed by Gerardo de Leon (uncredited), and co-starred Fernando Po and Leopold Celecdo. The other Japanese-produced feature film shot in the Philippines was Tatlong Maria (1944). At the same time, the comedy duo Pugo and Togo, popular for satirizing Japanese occupation in the Philippines, was renamed to Tuguing and Puguing because of Togo name's closeness to Tojo, the name of the Prime Minister of Japan during the early 1940s. However, perhaps out of deference to the substantial local Japanese population, film censors were sensitive to Japanese complaints about negative representations of Japanese in U.S. films screened in the Philippines and aggressively cut scenes depicting Japanese soldiers committing atrocities in Thunder in the Orient (1939) and Fight For Peace (1939) years before Japanese military occupation.

During World War II, almost all actors depended only on stage shows on most major Manila movie theaters as livelihood. As a consequence, live theater began to thrive again as movie stars, directors and technicians returned to the stage.

=== Postwar 1940s and the 1950s: The first golden age ===
==== Post-war Cebuano and Ilonggo cinema and its resurgence ====
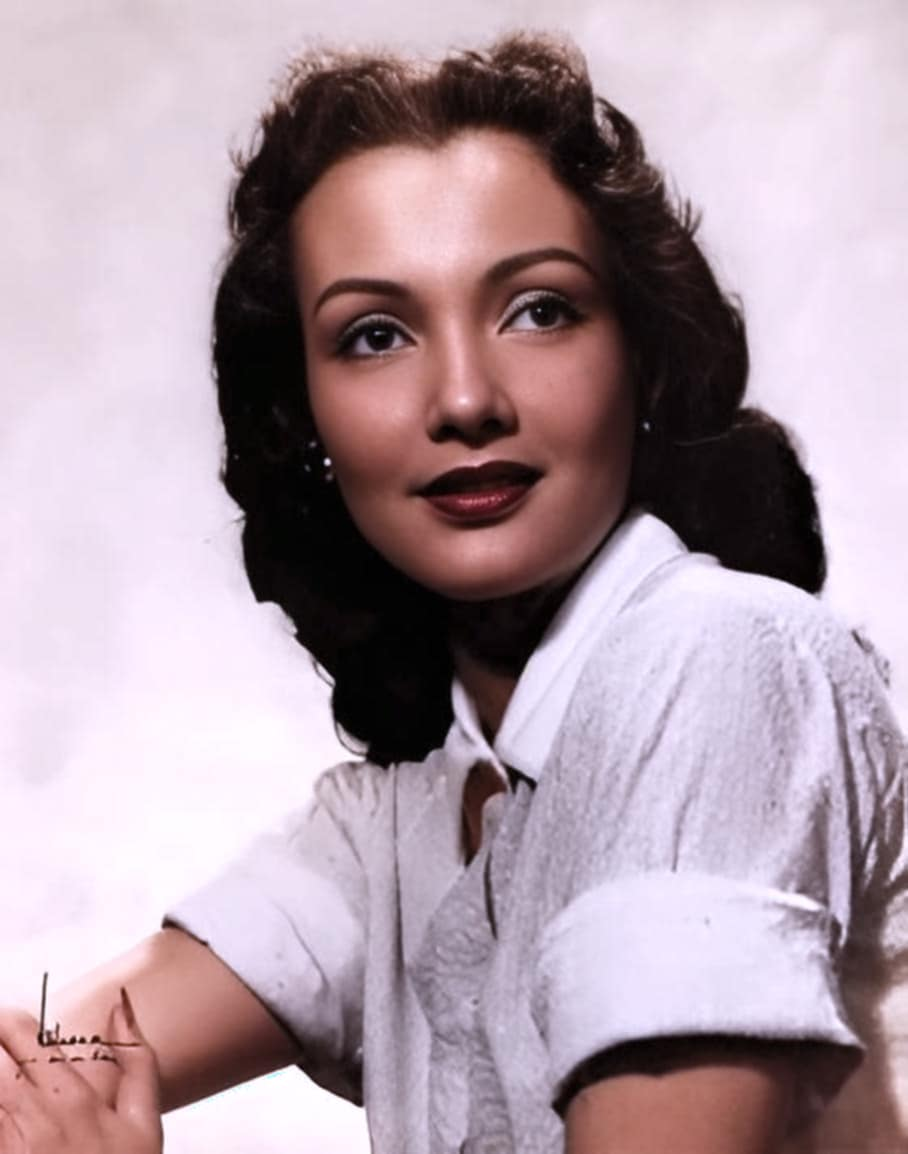
Filipina Legend actress Sigrid Sophia Agatha de Torres von Giese also known as Paraluman.

After the second world war, a resurgence of Visayan films came about through Lapu-Lapu Pictures, which produced Timbu Mata (1948), starring Eva de Villa and Lino Ramas, and Damgo ni Adan (Adan's Dream), produced by Rudy Robles. Then came Mactan Films which produced Tahas (Mission; 1950), starring Luz Celeste and Dakay; Mat Ranillo was in this film. Then Balud (Wave; 1950) which starred Luz Celeste and Mat Ranillo. Another independent picture, Sa Kabukiran (In the Mountains; 1948), was also produced during this time.

By 1951, Azucena Productions was established by the Arong Family (owners of Rene and Liberty Theaters). They produced Princesa Tirana (Princess Tirana), 1951 with Mat Ranillo and Gloria Sevilla (her first feature title role after she was discovered through a declamation contest at the University of the Visayas) as lead players. Their first feature together made such a box office success in the Visayas and Mindanao that other features immediately followed: Leonora (1951), Pailub Lang (Be Forebearing; 1951), Utlanan (Border; 1952), Handumanan (Memoir; 1953), Inahan (Mother; 1952), starring Mat Ranillo and Caridad Sanchez; Antigan (1952) with Virgie Postigo and Arise Roa; Carmen 1 and 2 (from the famous radio drama in Cebu; 1953), Paabuta Lang Ako (Wait for Me; 1953), Gloria Kong Anak (Gloria My Child; 1953), and Gihigugma Kong Ikaw (I Love You; 1954). Mat and Gloria then became synonymous to Visayan pictures, and since then were called as the King and Queen of Visayan Movies.

In 1953 a film entitled Sangang Nangabali (Broken Branches), produced by Cebu Stars Production broke box-office records in the mid-1950s. Cebu Stars Productions (owned by the Tojong Family) had earlier produced Dimakaling (1952) and Mga Anak Intawon (Oh, Poor Children; 1953). Other independent Visayan films produced at this time were: Mapait Ang Balaod (by Arturo Blanco; 1953), Bugas Mais (Corn Rice; by Arturo Blanco; 1953), Kapintas Sa Kinabuhi (Hard Life; 1953), (Cebu Stars Productions with Esterlina and Rebecca Torres), Pit Senor (Hail Senor) and San Tilmo (1953), (Barba Productions), Ang Siloy (1953) (with Nora Hermosa and Rebecca Torres), Huni sa Gugma (Where Is Love; 1953), Dadansoy (1953) and Inahan (Mother; 1954).

Mutya and VM Productions (formed by Natalio Bacalso – former Cebu assemblyman) entered Salingsing sa Kasakit (Partner in Pain), directed by Bacalso, in the 1955 FAMAS derby and won the "Best Child Actor Award" for Undo Juezan. These movie outfits also produced some memorable features such as Ungo Sa Parian (Witch In The Parian); Remember Erlinda;Rosita; Politika (Politics); and Mutya sa Saging Tindok (Muse of Saging Tindok). Garbosa (Proud; 1957) and Matam-is Ang Pagpaubos (Too Sweet to Suffer; 1957) were also released during this time.

Mat ang Gloria finally got married off-screen (in real life) and formed S-R Productions in 1954. The company's initial projects were Paradista (1955) and May Luhang Nahabilin sa Baybayon (A Tear Fell on the Shore; 1955) and even as they moved on to make Tagalog movies in Manila, they still continued producing Visayan films like (It is the Palm That Commands) with Gabriel Elorde and Edita Clomera; Palad Ta ang Nagbuot Lungsod sa Buenavista (Town of Buenavista; 1969), and Hain ang Langit (Where Is Heaven?; 1969), with Gloria Sevilla and Mat Ranillo and Von Serna – this is Mat's last film. Badlis sa Kinabuhi (The Line of Life; 1969) was entered in the 18th FAMAS Awards and got 12 nominations out of 14 categories. Gloria Sevilla won Best Actress, Frankie Navaja, Jr. won Best Child Performer, and the late Mat Ranillo got a posthumous award (Mat Ranillo had earlier died in a plane crash in 1969). The film (Badlis) was the Philippine entry to the ASEAN Film Festival in Indonesia, and was showcased under the informative division of the Berlin Film Festival (the film was dubbed in English in Hong Kong and retitled "Destined"). In 1970, Badlis Sa Kinabuhi and Palad Ta Ang Nagbuot were released in their original Visayan versions in Metro Manila and made good at the box office. Ang Bayan (The Country), 1970 was also produced at this time.

The 1970s saw the emergence of more Visayan talents in the Tagalog film industry. Actresses such as Chanda Romero, Caridad Sanchez, Alma Moreno, Tessie Sevilla, Rebecca Torres, Aurora Villa, Eva de Villa, Rosita Fernandez, Virgie Postigo, Virgie Solis, Olivia Solis, Cora Real, Diana Arong, Luz Celeste, Annabelle Rama, Suzette Ranillo, Lady Ramos, Pilar Pilapil, and others stepped into the limelight. Male leads (to name a few) were Bert Nombrado, Ber Lopez, Tony Delgado, Riel Ylaya, Lino Ramas, Arturo Blanco, Arturo de Castille, Frankie Navaja Jr, Tony Cruz, Undo Juezan, Felix de Catalina, Arsie Roa, Warfi Engracia, Kadyo Roma and Romy Kintanar (who is now a sports commentator). Directors Leroy Salvador, Fernando Alfon, Talyo Bacalso, Sat Villarino, Gene Labella, Leox Juesan, Cesar B. Cesar and Emmanuel H. Borlaza also originated from the south. Borlaza directed Alma Bonita (with Chanda Romero and Ernie Garcia) and Paypay Placid (Fan of Placid), Diadem Films, (with Pepito Rodriguez, Lilian Lain, Alice Mendez, and Justo C. Justo). Other films that were produced at this time were Medalyon Nga Bulawan (Medalyon Na Ginto), produced by Annabelle Rama, starring Bert Leroy, Gina Pareno, Jerry Pons, Charlie Davao, Johnny Delgado, Raul Aragon, Alice Mendez, and Yoyoy Villame; (with Nobo Bono, Jr. and Tessie Sevilla); Mayor AndalBatul of Mactan (Battle of Mactan), JRJ Productions, starring Chanda Romero, Eddie Peregrina and Alice Mendez; Anino sa Villa Lagrimas (Shadow of Villa Lagrimas), starring Chanda Romero and Ernie Garcia; Bulawan Sa Lapok (Gold in the Mud), starring Alicia Alonzon, Bert Leroy Jr., Tommy Abuel and Dindo Fernando; Antonio Solitaryo and Mga Milagaro sa Santo Niño (Miracles of Sto. Niño), Magnolia Films both directed by Sol Gaudite; Aliyana, 1974; and Ikaduhang Bathala (Second God), 1974.

Gloria Sevilla remarried in 1971, and together with her husband Amado Cortez (of the Padilla clan) went on to produce another Visayan film entitled Gimingaw Ako (I Long For You), 1974 (which was shot entirely in Cebu City and directed by Amado Cortez starring Gloria Sevilla, Suzette Ranillo, Bert Nombrado and Inday Nita Cortez). This film won the FAMAS "Best Actress Award" for Gloria Sevilla and "Best Supporting Actress Award" for Suzette Ranillo. Naghila Ako sa Kahilum (Crying Silently) also came about within the year. Other independent productions were: Diego Salvador, 1973; Ang Pagbabalik ni Diego Salvador (The Return of Diego Salvador), 1974 with Von Serna; and Sabrin, 1975 with Chanda Romero and Rebecca Torres.

Visayan film producers continued trying to revive the Visayan movies in the mid-seventies by filming in the 16mm format and transferring the material to 35mm for theatrical release. Films such as Ang Manok ni San Pedro (St. Peter's Rooster), 1975 and Itlog Manoy Orange (The Orange Egg Vendor), 1976 were originally shot in 16mm. This less costly process, however, did not prevent the Visayan film industry from finally going into a dormant stage. The Tagalog film industry was just at an upswing at this time, prompting Visayan producers to venture into television production instead.

It was not until 1991 that another Visayan film project was brought to the big screen. Eh Kasi Babae (Because She Is a Woman) starring Pilita Corales, Yoyoy Villame and Manilyn Reynes was produced, then followed by Matud Nila (They Say; 1991) (Bisaya Films, Inc. produced by James R. Cuenco, Jr.). This starred Gloria Sevilla, Mat Ranillo III, Suzette Ranillo, Dandin Ranillo, Juni Ranillo, Pilar Pilapil, Jennifer Sevilla, Mark Gil and Pinky Marquez. Matud Nila also marked the last film directed by Leroy Salvador.

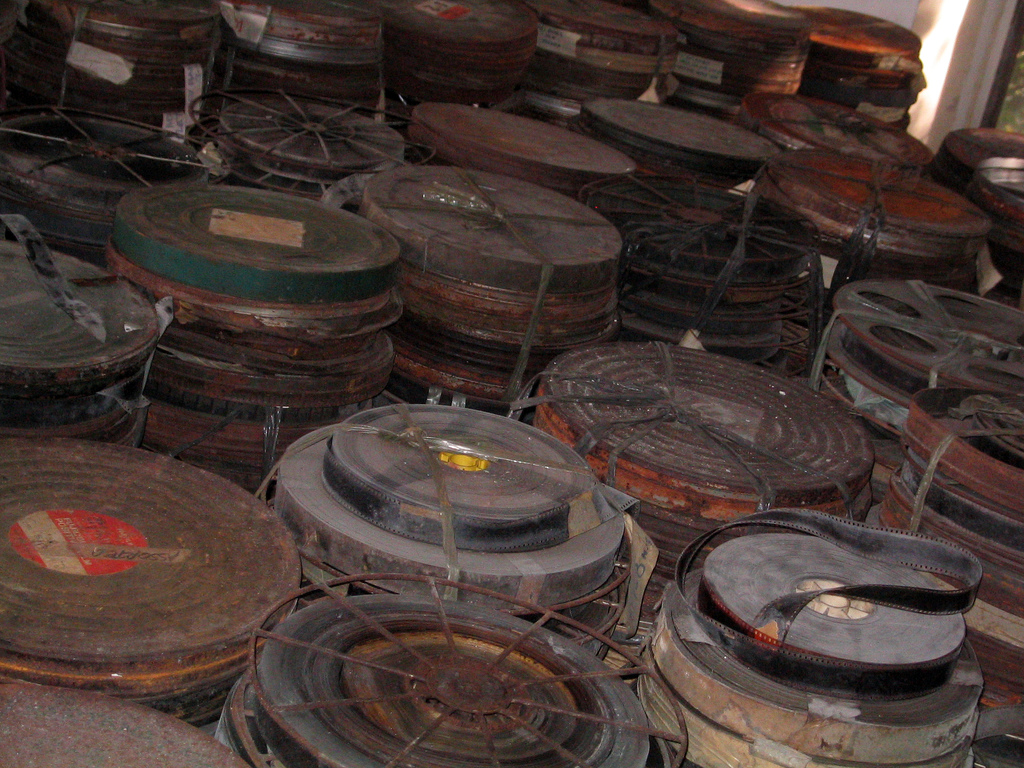
Bundles of 35-mm films of several old movies being kept by the Mowelfund at the Movie Museum of the Philippines in Quezon City.

==== The golden age and contemporary era of Tagalog cinema ====
After World War II, the Philippine version of a war film emerged as a genre. The audience were hungry for films with patriotic themes. Films such as Garrison 13 (1946), Dugo ng Bayan (The Country's Blood) (1946), Walang Kamatayan (Deathless) (1946), and Guerilyera (1946), narrated the horrors of the war and the heroism of the soldiers and guerrillas.

The 1950s was labeled as the first golden age of Philippine cinema. Four big production studios (LVN Pictures, Sampaguita Pictures, Premiere Productions and Lebran International) were at their peak in filmmaking, employing premier directors like Gerardo de León, Eddie Romero and César Gallardo while contracting the biggest stars of that period. The Filipino film industry was one of the busiest and bustling film communities in Asia, releasing an average of 350 films a year making Philippines second to Japan in terms of film productions a year.

The premier directors of the era were (but not limited to):

- Lamberto Avellana (1915–1991)
- Gerardo de León (1913–1981)
- Gregorio Fernández (1904–1973)
- Consuelo Ateng Padilla Osorio (1907–1987)
- César Gallardo
- Armando Garces
- Eddie Romero (1924–2013)
- Cirio Santiago (1936–2008)

The biggest stars of the era were (but not limited to):

- Tessie Agana (b. 1942)
- Dely Atayatayan (1914–2004)
- Andoy Balunbalunan (1909–1944)
- Bentot (1928–1986)
- Nida Blanca (1936–2001)
- Nena Cardenas (1932–2020)
- Bayani Casimiro (1918–1989)
- Levi Celerio (1910–2002)
- Chichay (1918–1993)
- Chiquito (1932–1997)
- Manuel Conde (1915–1985)
- Rogelio de la Rosa (1916–1986)
- Jaime de la Rosa (1921–1992)
- Gil de León (1919–1992)
- Van de León (1920–1981)
- Nestor de Villa (1928–2004)
- Eddie del Mar (1919–1986)
- Rosa del Rosario (1917–2006)
- Mila del Sol (1923–2020)
- Lauro Delgado (1932–1978)
- Dolphy (1928–2012)
- Linda Estrella (1922–2012)
- Arsenia Francisco (1923–1971)
- Eddie García (1929–2019)
- Rita Gómez (1935–1990)
- Luis Gonzales (1928–2012)
- Óscar Keese (1918–1968)
- Anita Linda (1924–2020)
- Vicente Liwanag
- Lopito (1912–1966)
- Rosa Mia (1925–2006)
- Fred Montilla (1919–2003)
- Oscar Moreno (1921–2003)
- Óscar Obligación (1924–2010)
- Bert Olivar (1921–2001)
- José Padilla, Jr. (1911–1978)
- Paraluman (1923–2009)
- Patsy (Pachochay) (1916–1979)
- Fred Peñalosa
- Ben Pérez (1924–1966)
- Pugak (1923–1994)
- Pugo (1910–1978)
- César Ramírez (1929–2003)
- Delia Razon (1930–2025)
- Efren Reyes, Sr. (1924–1968)
- Johnny Reyes (1922–1995)
- Lolita Rodriguez (1935–2016)
- Gloria Romero (1933–2025)
- Rosa Rosal (1928–2025)
- Carmen Rosales (1917–1991)
- Ben Rubio (1917–1980)
- Ruben Rustia (1923–1994)
- Carlos Salazar (1933–2022)
- Tony Santos, Sr. (1920–1988)
- Charito Solis (1935–1998)
- Togo (1905–1952)
- Tolindoy (1909–1958)
- Tugak (1917–2006)
- Carol Varga (1930–2008)
- Alicia Vergel (1927–1992)
- Evelyn Villar (1934–2022)
- Billy "Surot" Vizcarra
- Zaldy Zshornack (1937–2002)

The four biggest production studios produced most of the notable films of Philippine cinema during this era. In 1951, the film Roberta of Sampaguita Pictures which featured leading child stars broke box office records, becoming the highest grossing Philippine film at the time. LVN Pictures, under the leadership of the Doña Sisang de León, not only specialized in super productions, rural comedies and musicals, but also produced socially-relevant films such as Avellana's Anak Dalita (1956), Tony Santos's Badjao (1957) and Manuel Silos's Biyaya ng Lupa (1959). Sampaguita Pictures mainly produced high-gloss, glamorous pictures such as Maalaala Mo Kaya (1954). On the other hand, Premiere Productions released most of the action films of the decade, such as Sawa sa Lumang Simboryo (1952), Salabusab (1954) and Huwag Mo Akong Limutin (1960).

High production values on the motion pictures during this era produced movies that gained international acclaim. In 1952, Manuel Conde's Genghis Khan became the first Asian film to be shown at the Venice and Cannes Film Festival, a feat that would not be repeated until the 1970s. Inspired by Conde's picture, Hollywood remade Genghis Khan in 1956 as The Conqueror starring John Wayne as Genghis Khan and produced by RKO Radio Pictures. And also of Columbia Pictures' film "Genghis Khan" in which Omar Sharif portrayed in the title role in 1965.

In 1956, Anak Dalita won the Golden Harvest Award (Best Picture) of the prestigious Asia-Pacific Film Festival. Actress Lilia Dizon, was presented with the Best Actress Award by the prince of Cambodia, Norodom Sihanouk, for the film Kandelerong Pilak in the 1954 Asia-Pacific Film Festival. Leroy Salvador was also recognized in his performance as Best Supporting Actor for the film Huk sa Bagong Pamumuhay (1953) in the same film festival.

During this era, the first award-giving body was also established in 1950. The Maria Clara Awards of the Manila Times Publishing Corp., was composed of film publicists and writers who voted for the exemplary achievements of Filipino motion pictures in a calendar year. In 1953, the María Clara folded up to give way to the establishment of the Filipino Academy of Movie Arts and Sciences (FAMAS), the Philippines' equivalent to the United States' Academy Awards in prestige.

During this period, Filipinos saw Hollywood's first full-length picture in living Technicolor. Soon after, Filipino local producers started presenting full-length pictures in color despite some technical deficiency, one of which was Prinsipe Amante (Prince Amante).

=== 1960s ===
This era is characterized by rampant commercialism with James Bond and Western knock offs, and in the later 1960s, the so-called bomba (soft porn) pictures. It was also the era of musical films produced mostly by Sampaguita Pictures and their discovered talents.

The studio systems came under siege from the growing labor movement, which resulted in labor-management conflicts. The first studio to close was Lebran followed by Premiere Productions then LVN. Those production studios were replaced by new and independent producers like Regal Films, which was established by Lily Monteverde in 1962.

The decade also saw the emergence of the youth subculture best represented by the Beatles and rock and roll. As a result, certain movie genres were made to cater to this trend. Fan movies and teen love team-ups emerged, showing Nora Aunor and Vilma Santos, along with Tirso Cruz III and Edgar Mortiz as their respective screen sweethearts. In addition, movie genres showing disaffection to the status quo during the era were also popular. Action movies with Pinoy cowboys and secret agents as the movers of the plots depicted a "society ravaged by criminality and corruption". Another kind of youth revolt, implying rejection of adult corruption, came in the form of movies featuring child stars. Near the end of this decade, another movie genre that embodied a different form of revolt took center stage. Soft porn movies, more popularly known as bomba films, increasingly became popular, and these films were described as a direct challenge to the conventions, norms and conduct of the society.

Even in the period of decline, several Philippine films that stood out. These include the following films by Gerardo de Leon:

- Huwag Mo Akong Limutin (Never Forget Me) in 1960;
- Noli Me Tangere (Touch Me Not) in 1961;
- El Filibusterismo (Subversion) in 1962

During this period, Filipino filmmakers were more successful in presenting some full-length pictures in living Eastmancolor, one of which was Ito ang Pilipino by J.E. Production. This movie was produced and starred by Joseph Estrada.

=== 1970s to early 1980s: Second Golden Age ===
Touted as the second golden age of Philippine cinema, this was the period of the avant-garde filmmakers. At the turn of the 70s, local producers and filmmakers ceased to produce pictures in black and white.

In 1972, the Philippines was placed under martial law, and films were used as propaganda vehicles. President Ferdinand Marcos and his technocrats sought to regulate filmmaking through the creation of the Board of Censors for Motion Pictures (BCMP). Prior to the start of filming, a finished script was required to be submitted to the Board and incorporate the "ideology" of the New Society Movement such as, a new sense of discipline, uprightness and love of country. Annual festivals were revived, and the Bomba films as well as political movies critical of the Marcos administration were banned.

Maharlika was a 1971 film banned by then-first lady Imelda Marcos because it starred actress Dovie Beams, who was allegedly Ferdinand Marcos' mistress. The producer of the film was Luis Nepomuceno, son of Filipino filmmaker Jose Nepomuceno. The company that produced the film went bankrupt, as the banned screening prevented them from recouping production costs. In pity, Imelda Marcos offered loans to the company through government banks. However, the bank would then go on to foreclose the film company.

The film portrayed the story of Ferdinand Marcos' life in the Philippine military. There have been allegations that the film was propaganda intended to portray Marcos as a war hero who fought against the Japanese in World War II. Although the film was banned, it was allowed to make its cinematic debut in 1987, after the EDSA Revolution.

In spite of the censorship, the exploitation of sex and violence onscreen continued to assert itself. Under martial law, action films usually append an epilogue like claims that social realities depicted had been wiped out with the establishment of the New Society. The notorious genre of sex or bomba films still existed but in a milder, less overt way like female stars swimming in their underwear or taking a bath in their chemise, labeled as the "wet look". An example of the trend was the 1974 hit movie Ang Pinakamagandang Hayop sa Balat ng Lupa (The Most Beautiful Animal on the Face of the Earth) which featured former Miss Universe Gloria Díaz and filmed in the famed Sicogon Island in Carles, Iloilo.

In spite of the presence of censorship, this period paved way to the ascendancy of a new breed of directors. Some of the notable films made by these new crop of filmmakers were:

- Ishmael Bernal (1938–1996)
  - Pagdating sa Dulo (1971)
  - Nunal sa Tubig (1975)
  - Salawahan (1979)
  - Manila by Night/City After Dark (1980)
  - Relasyon (1982)
  - Himala (1982)
  - Hinugot sa Langit (1985)
- Lino Brocka (1939–1991)
  - Tinimbang Ka Ngunit Kulang (1974)
  - Maynila sa mga Kuko ng Liwanag (1975)
  - Insiang (1976)
  - Ang Tatay Kong Nanay (1978)
  - Bona (1980)
  - Bayan Ko: Kapit sa Patalim (1984)
  - Orapronobis (1989)
- Celso Ad. Castillo (1943–2012)
  - Burlesk Queen (1977)
  - Pagputi ng Uwak, Pag-itim ng Tagak (1978)
- Mike de León (1947–2025)
  - Itim (1976)
  - Kakabakaba Ka Ba? (1980)
  - Kisapmata (1981)
  - Batch '81 (1982)
  - Sister Stella L. (1984)
- Peque Gallaga (1943–2020)
  - Oro, Plata, Mata (1982)
  - Scorpio Nights (1985)
- Mario O'Hara (1946–2012)
  - Tatlong Taong Walang Diyos (1976)
  - Babae sa Breakwater (2003)

In 1977, Eric de Guia, going by his pseudonym Kidlat Tahimik, made a film entitled Mababangong Bangungot (Perfumed Nightmare), which won the International Critic's Prize in the Berlin Film Festival that same year. Out of short film festivals sponsored by the University of the Philippines Film Center and by the Experimental Cinema of the Philippines, young filmmakers joined Kidlat Tahimik by distancing themselves from the traditions of mainstream cinema. Nick Deocampo’s Oliver (1983) and Raymond Red's Ang Magpakailanman (The Eternal, 1983) have received attention in festivals abroad.

In 1978, cartoonist Severino "Nonoy" Marcelo produced an adult animated historical satire based on Marcos' book of the same name, Tadhana, the first-ever Philippine feature-length animated film. It presents a satirical, humorous and poignant view of the Philippines' history of Spanish colonization through highly original and surreal vignettes fusing art, mythology and music. Originally conceived as a television pilot, Marcelo was collaborated with then-senator Imee Marcos and his uncle José Zabala-Santos for creating the film and premiered in Philippine television for the anniversary of Martial Law in the same year. In retrospective years, only a few copies survived and was officially screened at the National Gallery Singapore’s ‘Painting with Light,’ an annual festival of international films on art.

In 1981, as mandated by Executive Order No. 640-A, the Film Academy of the Philippines was enacted, serving as the umbrella organization that oversees the welfare of various guilds of the film industry and gave recognition to the artistic and technical excellence of the performances of its workers and artists. The same year, Viva Films was established and began its rise as a production company.

Also in 1981, first lady Imelda Marcos organized the first Manila International Film Festival (MIFF). The objective was to promote Filipino films for them to be distributed worldwide. A lavish event took place January 18–29, 1982, major entertainment figures were present including Priscilla Presley, Franco Nero, Brooke Shields, Jeremy Irons, etc. Local filmmakers saw it as a real opportunity to showcase their talents. The spy comedy spoof For Your Height Only (1981) turned Ernesto dela Cruz, better known as Weng Weng, in a short lived international star and gave him the notoriety to become a unique figure in cinema being a short person who performs death defying stunts. At the event, For Your Height Only outsold every other films on foreign sales, while dela Cruz was the mediatic center of attention and the breakthrough celebrity. Marcos' daughter Imee said dela Cruz's success shocked and shattered everyone's artistic aspirations. Filipino film historians Teddy Co and Ed Lejano said that in the film industry the Weng Weng image was uncomfortable since at the time they had no other international figures. The film became Philippines' highest exported film, and within their acting community dela Cruz's international reach hasn't been topped.

The second MIFF took place from January 24-February 4, 1983. 280 local and foreign films were screened out of competition in the 12-day festival while 22 films from 21 countries competed for seven different categories. Despite the festival's financial success, the festival received criticisms from the Catholic Church, film censors, and civic groups. Cardinal Jaime Sin, Archbishop of Manila, criticized the festival's organizers, Johnny Litton and First Lady Imelda Marcos, for allowing the screening of soft-core pornographic movies in participating theaters. Board of Review for Motion Pictures and Television Chairman Maria Kalaw-Katigbak also questioned the legality of showing films banned by the board in commercial cinemas. Because of the controversies and public outcry, the succeeding Manila International Film Festivals were permanently canceled.

Among the Philippines' most political filmmakers was Lino Brocka (1939–1991). His works such as Manila in the Claws of Light (1975) and Fight for Us (1989) are considered to be some of the greatest films ever made in the Philippines. Though initially fairly neutral on the Marcos regime because of his friendship with Imee Marcos, President Marcos' daughter who helped sponsor the fundraising premiere of his film Insiang (1976), he later adopted a more political stance by 1983. He contributed in the building of a post-Marcos Philippines and was able to help topple the Marcos dictatorship through his active participation in cultural and social activities. His films told the story of the underclass' struggle, the dark side of a sprawling metropolis and featured poverty-stricken locations which were able to make a statement with regards to the Marcos' autocratic rule and human rights violations. He was also notably part of the group of filmmakers, artists and cultural workers that formed the Free Artist Movement which eventually became the Concerned Artists of the Philippines. This group challenged the censorship practice that the Marcoses imposed on all artistic media.

During the closing years of martial rule, a number of films defiant of the Marcos dictatorship were made. Films such as Marilou Diaz-Abaya’s Karnal implicitly depicted this defiance in the film's plot, wherein patricide ended a tyrannical father's domination. In the same year, Mike de Leon's Sister Stella L., a film about oppression and tyranny was shown on the big screen. In 1985, Lino Brocka's This Is My Country depicted images of torture, incarceration, struggles and oppression. During this period, the Philippines ranked among the top 10 film-producing countries in the world, with an annual output of more than 300 movies. Amidst a glut of erotic films in the industry, several young actresses in "bold" films either committed suicide (Stella Strada, Pepsi Paloma), made attempts at suicide (Sarsi Emmanuelle), or died in a car accident (Claudia Zobel). Lyka Ugarte, another actress from the period, made suicide attempts later in the 2000s due to depression.

=== Late 1980s to 1990s ===
Come to think of it, it's been 90 years, they say, since the first film was shown on these shores, but it seems that the most popular medium of the century has failed to explore the various facets of our lives.

— JC Nigado, writing for the Manila Standard in July 1987

By the time the People Power Revolution deposed Ferdinand Marcos from the presidency, most Filipino films were mass-produced with quality sacrificed for commercial success. Although the Movie and Television Review and Classification Board (MTRCB) and the Film Development Foundation of the Philippines (FDFP) had been established by Marcos in 1985 to assist the film industry's development, the imposition of a high amusement tax lead to the annual number of films produced to decline throughout the 1980s, although the number was still more than 200 films a year. Filmmaker Ishmael Bernal admitted in 1993 that his growing inactivity in filmmaking was because the national economy "went kamikaze since '86. Movie producers have since cut their budgets short, hiring quickie directors to make instant-hit ventures."

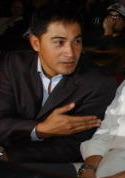
Cesar Montano

Storylines were unimaginative and predictable, comedy was slapstick, and the acting was either mediocre or overly dramatic. Producers resorted to formulas that worked well in the past that cater to the standards and tastes of the masses, and story ideas were often copied from Hollywood and Hong Kong films that were successful in local cinemas. Romantic dramas, broad comedy films and soft pornographic pictures composed the majority of the genre produced, while the action genre became especially prevalent during this period; in 1992, critic Justino Dormiendo observed that "the action flick itself remains as the most abused genre in our time." In reviewing the acclaimed American drama film Stand by Me, JC Nigado of the Manila Standard stated that he was disturbed while viewing the film because "I was hard put trying to figure out what local movie could have approximated it. And it bothered me that I couldn't think of any."

Copying has been Philippine cinema's biggest crime even back then. In reality, it already became an art form here. When the Chinese' kung fu became trendy here, we became more kung fu and more Chinese. When the cowboy of Americans and Italians became trendy here, we became more Jesse James and Django. When Sylvester Stallone's Rocky was released, out sprang our Rocky Tulog and Totoy Bato. For Rambo, our carbon copy is Rambo Tango. Our answer to Godfather is Ninong.

— Lav Diaz, writing for the Manila Standard in May 1988

Majority of them were pito-pito films, shot in seven to ten days and aimed at quickly recouping their minimal costs. Attendance in theaters rose and several productions became huge successes. New laws were also introduced that gave more rights to women, causing several female directors to launch careers.

Aside from competition with Hollywood films, the Asian Financial Crisis, escalating cost of film production, exorbitant taxes, arbitrary and excessive film censorship, high-tech film piracy, and rise of cable television further contributed for the trimming down of production costs of film outfits that resulted to falling box-office receipts of domestic films, and the eventual precarious state of the local film industry.

In 1993, a media conglomerate ABS-CBN Corporation ventured into film production when their newly established subsidiary Star Cinema produced Ronquillo: Tubong Cavite, Laking Tondo in cooperation with Regal Films. Two years later, another television station, GMA Network, started producing films with its own production outfit called GMA Films. In the late 1990s, GMA released the critically acclaimed Sa Pusod ng Dagat, Jose Rizal, and Muro-Ami, which attained commercial success.

In 1997, the country produced its first ever full-length theatrical animated film, Adarna: The Mythical Bird, directed by Geirry A. Garccia. In October 1998, the Philippines and Canada signed the "Audio-Visual Co-Production Agreement" to support collaborative productions between the two countries; Canada had signed similar co-production agreements with four other countries during that time, including Singapore.

=== 2000s: Decline of commercial films and emergence of Philippine New Wave Cinema ===
An economic slump experienced by the film industry in the 2000s led to the near extinction of local action films. After renewed calls were made by Film Development Foundation officials Bienvenido Lumbera and filmmaker Laurice Guillen for the creation of a new film body, the Film Development Council of the Philippines was established through Republic Act No. 9167 in 2002, based on bills authored by representatives Imee Marcos and Cynthia Villar and Senators Manny Villar and Loren Legarda among others.

The period of the 2000s was marked by the rise of digital and experimental cinema. Following the Short Film Palme d'Or win of Raymond Red's film Anino (Shadows) at the 2000 Cannes Film Festival, the 1999 digital feature film Still Lives by Jon Red pioneered this digital revolution; many other digital filmmakers soon followed suit. Cheaper production cost using digital media over film has helped the rebirth of independent filmmaking. Hailed as the inspiration to French New Wave in digital form, this decade saw the proliferation of digital films by independent filmmakers with international reach and caliber, and the introduction of locally produced animated features.

It was in 1999 that digital cinema was introduced in the Philippines but by then, the film industry was already dwindling in numbers. But signs of resurgence came by way of movies with inspirational themes. In 2002, Gil Portes released Mga Munting Tinig (Small Voices), a subdued movie about a teacher who inspired her students to follow their dreams; the movie also implied improving the country's education system. A year later, Mark Meily's comedy Crying Ladies, about three Filipinas working as professional mourners in Manila's Chinatown but looking for other ways to earn a living, became a huge hit. Also that same year, Maryo J. de los Reyes made a buzz at various film festivals with Magnifico, a simple film with universal appeal about a boy trying to help his family survive their hardships.

In 2005, the film industry saw the lowest number of films produced with only 50 films that were commercially released. However, the establishment of film festivals Cinemalaya and Cinema One Originals which are dedicated to digital films, the addition of Digital Lokal, a digital section, at the Cinemanila International Film Festival, and the second offering of the .MOV International Digital Film Festival helped save the Philippine Film industry. By 2006 and 2007, more Filipino filmmakers started making movies using digital media.

Filipino digital films, made in almost no time and with meager budget, were strongly represented in international film festivals, including Berlin, Cannes, Venice, Vienna and Rotterdam. with several winning prizes and awards. Among the more prominent winners were Ang Pagdadalaga ni Maximo Oliveros (2005) by Auraeus Solito, Kubrador (2006) by Jeffrey Jeturian, Todo Todo Teros (2006) by John Torres, Endo (2007) by Jade Castro, Tribu (2007) by Jim Libiran.

In December 2009, a House Bill authored by Buhay Party-List Representative Irwin Tieng reducing the amusement tax imposed on local films from 30% to 10% was signed into law as Republic Act 9640, culminating more than two decades of attempts to lower the film tax.

2010 saw the release of an eponymous documentary film, Philippine New Wave: This Is Not a Film Movement, which documented the rise of internationally acclaimed digital filmmakers from the Philippines, and widely popularized the description of this era as the "Philippine New Wave".

=== 2010s: Box office resurgence ===
2011 is the most fruitful year in Philippine Cinema history as 3 films produced within the year (all from Star Cinema) landed in the top 3 of the highest grossing Filipino films of all time. Wenn Deramas' The Unkabogable Praybeyt Benjamin grossed ₱331.6 million in box office and became the highest grossing local film in the Philippines. No Other Woman grossed ₱278.39 million while 2011 Metro Manila Film Festival ("MMFF") entry Enteng Ng Ina Mo, has a gross income of ₱237.89 million (as of January 7, 2012) and considered the highest-grossing MMFF entry of all time. However, Sisterakas, a Kris Aquino-Ai Ai delas Alas-Vice Ganda movie, replaced the title of Enteng ng Ina Mo and the Unkabogable Praybeyt Benjamin as it became the highest grossing Filipino film and highest grossing MMFF entry of all time.

In 2013, It Takes a Man and a Woman, the third film of the A Very Special Love series of Sarah Geronimo and John Lloyd Cruz, made many box office records, one of which is being the current "Highest Grossing Filipino Film of All Time", replacing Sisterakas. It made ₱375,024,507 during its theatrical run in the Philippines and ₱211,573,332 overseas, for a total of ₱586,597,839 worldwide until Vice Ganda's Girl, Boy, Bakla, Tomboy and Kris Aquino's My Little Bossings (both are MMFF entries) surpassed their local box-office record and battle for the first spot .

In 2014, The Amazing Praybeyt Benjamin, another Vice Ganda film, breaks his own record again with an estimated gross of ₱450 million. Meanwhile, the sequel of Kris Aquino's Feng Shui series is the highest grossing Filipino horror film.

In 2015, a new box-office breaking record has been set as A Second Chance, the sequel of John Lloyd Cruz and Bea Alonzo's One More Chance earns PHP 556,000,000 worldwide surpassing Vice Ganda's The Amazing Praybeyt Benjamin. It is surpassed again by a film jointly produced by Star Cinema and Viva Films, Beauty and the Bestie, which stars Vice Ganda.

The mid 2010s also saw broader commercial success of films produced by independent studios, with Antoinette Jadaone's Cinema One Originals Film Festival entry That Thing Called Tadhana achieving commercial success upon its commercial release in 2015, becoming the highest grossing independently produced Filipino film of all time in under 3 weeks despite facing piracy issues online during its run.

September 2015 saw the release of Jerrold Tarog's Heneral Luna, a 2015 historical biopic film depicting General Antonio Luna's leadership of the Philippine Revolutionary Army during the Philippine–American War, produced by an independent outfit called Artikulo Uno Productions. Because it was independently produced, Heneral Luna initially fell prey to the commercial theater practice of dropping films after only a few screening days on the first week. But praise from critics and audiences alike, praising the film's writing, plot, acting, and cinematography resulted in a word of mouth campaign to bring the movie back to theaters. As a result, Heneral Luna become the highest grossing Filipino historical film of all time on its third week in cinemas. Similar word of mouth campaigns would allow critically acclaimed films like Antoinette Jadaone's That Thing Called Tadhana (commercially released in 2015) and JP Habac's I'm Drunk, I Love You (2017) to achieve broad commercial success even if they did not benefit from the large promotional budget and television cross-promotion enjoyed by commercial studio films.

In spite of the development of independent cinema in the 21st century, Philippine cinema's long-standing star system remained firmly in place in the years prior to the COVID-19 pandemic. Writer-producer Kriz Gazmen, who would later become head of Star Cinema under ABS-CBN Corporation in 2022, stated that "More than the content, I think the main driver to the cinemas are the stars. That is what they are really paying for: star value."

On December 10, 2019, the Supreme Court deemed the collection of amusement taxes by the Film Development Council of the Philippines (FDCP) to be unconstitutional, and ruled that its Cinema Evaluation Board should no longer award amusement tax privileges to films.

=== 2020s: Centennial year of Philippine cinema and onward ===
On September 12, 2019, the film industry celebrated the 100th anniversary of Philippine cinema, in pursuant to Presidential Proclamation 622, S. 2018, which declares the same day up until September 11, 2020, as Philippine Cinema's Centennial Year.

The COVID-19 pandemic had an enormously negative effect on the film industry. According to producer Josabeth Alonso, nearly every local film released in 2022 was not able to earn more than ₱10 million in grosses. At the same time, the resulting lack of foreign films in Southeast Asia in the early 2020s caused a major shift in the local distribution market that has yet to return to pre-pandemic status. The streaming site Netflix has grown to be influential in the market, with the 2019 film Dead Kids becoming the first Filipino film produced as a Netflix original, while ABS-CBN later produced its first Netflix original film titled Sosyal Climbers in 2025. Viva Communications' streaming service Vivamax (later renamed VMX), which largely produced sexploitation films and series, became the most prolific producer of films in the industry during the pandemic, with several established filmmakers such as Jose Javier Reyes, Mac Alejandre, Richard V. Somes, Joel Lamangan and Brillante Mendoza directing films for the platform. In 2024, Star Cinema's romantic drama film Hello, Love, Again became the first Filipino film to gross more than ₱1 billion at the worldwide box office.

Several films that deal with political subject matter such as A Tale of Filipino Violence (2023), Lost Sabungeros, Alipato at Muog, And So It Begins (all 2024) and Food Delivery (2025) were either removed from film festival schedules, given an "X" rating by the MTRCB, or limited in the number of theater screens it is exhibited in. Several films about the Marcos family were also made and released in theaters during the presidency of Bongbong Marcos: Maid in Malacañang (2022), Martyr or Murderer (2023) and Imelda Papin: The Untold Story (2023).

== Censorship ==
=== Under the Americans and the early Philippine Republic ===
Censorship in the Philippines truly began under the reign of the Spaniards, who prohibited works that were deemed revolutionary. While they prohibited literary, musical, and visual forms of art, film censorship was included in the picture upon the American colonization.

When the Americans took over after the Spanish–American War in 1898, a brief stint of Philippine cultural freedom after independence from Spain was halted. General Arthur MacArthur's military censorship focused on repressing nationalism, along with the Flag Act of 1907. Because film in itself was only beginning to form at the time, motion pictures brought to the Philippines were tame, and film was not yet seen as an avenue for social and cultural subversion.

In 1929, the Philippine Legislature creates Act. No. 3582, titled "An Act to Create a Board of Censorship for Moving Pictures and Define Its Functions". The board consisted of 15 members that sought "to examine all films, spoken or silent, imported or produced in the Philippine Islands, and prohibit the introduction and exhibition in this country of films, which in their judgement are immoral or contrary to law and good customs or injurious to the prestige of the Government of people of the Philippine Islands". In 1930, The first meeting of the board was conducted in the office of then Secretary of the Interior Honoro Ventura, and the first president of the board was Teodoro M. Kalaw. Out of the 1,249 films approved, 6 had parts cut out. Two films were banned.

In 1937 the film Batang Tulisan, directed by Rod Avlas and produced by Philippine Films was set to be released, and controversies arose regarding its sudden ban. The cost of production totaled 16,000 Pesos, and the film 2 and a half months to complete. Four reasons were stated as to why it was pulled-out: Three are aspects of the movie: the priest portrayed in a villainous light, the use of a hypodermic needle as a murder weapon, the amorous scenes between a 10-year-old couple, and the fact that "[the film] might give [the] youth certain subversive ideas". The production crew argued that this was an example of foreign films being given more lenience, despite being as bad (or sometimes, worse) than local cinema. The novel adaptation of Batang Tulisan which was published in Liwayway Magazine, in contrast, was not met with the same negative criticism.

In 1938, the Board of Censorship was renamed the Board of Review for Moving Pictures, enabled by the amendment of the law by Commonwealth Act No. 305.

=== The Eiga Heikusa: Under Japanese rule ===
In 1942, the Japanese occupation of the Philippines led to what was arguably the strictest period of censorship the country has faced. The Eiga Heikusa was established to act as a Board of Censors, and introduced Japanese films with American subtitles. In light of Japan's desire to convert the Philippines into a willing member of the Greater East-Asia Co-Prosperity Sphere, printed matter, radio shows, theater plays, and visual art were heavily monitored, leading to the hiatus of production for Philippine cinema until 1945. As a result, the country saw an increase in theatrical productions. Screen actors such as Carmen Rosales, Rogelio de la Rosa, Norma Blancaflor, Ely Ramos, Elsa Oria, Leopoldo Salcedo, and Ester Magalona, took to the entablado and were received well. Theaters showed bodabil (a malapropism of Vaudeville) shows where actors would perform a special number upon knowing that they were to be raided by the Kempei Tai, signaling the viewers to flee.

=== Post-war censorship ===
Independence and the regime of then President Manuel Roxas saw the creation of a new Board of Reviews for Moving Pictures, led by Marciano Roque, who would also become Executive Secretary under President Quirino. In months, the board reviewed 76 films, with only five being locally made. Due to the non-confirmation by the Congress of all 10 members of the board, it was reconstituted on October 29, 1946, with its seven official members. The newly appointed chairman was Dr. Gabriel Mañalac, and the secretary was Teodoro Valencia. The board had grown to 12 members by 1947, having reviewed a total of 463 films for the year. 435 were foreign, and 28 were locally produced. By the time, the Philippines had 463 officially recorded theaters, with 71 of them being in Manila. Ako Raw Ay Huk (Dir. Ramon Estrella) is one of the films that was banned at the time, due to allegations of it promoting communism.

In 1950, a Code of Motion Picture Censorship was instilled, further identifying what aspects were considered censorable. Scenes that depict drunkenness as attractive, scenes that depict drug trafficking, and scenes that deal with sex and surgical subjects "when shown to selected groups" are some examples of scenes that were put under review. Foreign films banned at the time include The Moon Is Blue (Dir. Otto Preminger) in 1954, and Martin Luther (Dir. Irving Pichel) in 1953. Perlas ng Silangan (Dir. Pablo Santiago) was screened without edits, which spiked a protest from the Provincial Board of Sulu, claiming that it misrepresented Muslim culture.

In April 1961, just months prior to the establishment of the Board of Censors for Motion Pictures, the national censorship board as headed by Alfredo Lozano Sr. prohibited the exhibition of films that depicted "gangsters in all categories and juvenile and teenage delinquents."

The Citizens Council for Better Motion Pictures was established by in 1960, as a response to a "grave concern over the general disappearance of the cherished virtues and traditions of the Christian way of life, the alarming increase in juvenile delinquency, and the deterioration of public and private morals". In 1961, they lobbied for what is presently known as the Censorship Law (Republic Act No. 3060), which was approved on June 17, 1961. The law, as written by Senator Pacita Madrigal-Gonzales, created an Appeals Committee, composed of the undersecretaries of justice, national defense, and education. This committee could revoke the decisions of the Board of Censors. Independent from the CCBMP, the still standing Board of Censors had grown to 24 members, and could now establish a system of classification which consisted of two categories: "for general patronage", and "for adults only". Jose L. Guevara was appointed by President Diosdado Macapagal as the new chairperson in 1962, and the board members appointed by President Carlos P. Garcia were removed, on account of their positions being "midnight" extensions.

In 1962, the board lifted the ban on mouth-to-mouth kissing, so long as it was deemed non-lascivious. In 1963 and after a long-pleaded appeal from the public, the board bans films that heavily play up violence and crime. Ang Manananggol ni Ruben (Dir. Eddie Garcia) was a 1963 film heavily based on the story of Ruben Ablaza, who was convicted for the rape of Annabelle Huggins. The film was initially approved and quickly banned in September, but was screened again in December after being renamed to Ang Manananggol.

In 1965, Iginuhit ng Tadhana (The Ferdinand E. Marcos Story) was released, and is arguably one of the most controversial films to come out of Philippine cinema, in that it was able to set the tone of Ferdinand Marcos’ entire presidential campaign. The movie, which chronicled the life of Marcos, had reached the realm of politics, ultimately leading the appointment of Marcos to presidency. In August 1965, the film was approved without change, but its premiere in September was halted on the time of the premiere itself. An en banc of the film was requested by then acting chairman Rosalina Castro, raising much suspicion from the press and the Nacionalistas. Days after, then chairman Jose L. Guevara resigned from his spot.

=== Bomba films ===
1967 onwards saw a relaxing of rules by the Board of Censorship, who started allowing more nudity and explicit sex. This led to the rise of commercial, pornographic bomba (taken from the term "bombshell", which normally included a scandal in Political public office) films, which persisted despite heavy criticism from Catholic groups. These films usually depicted outright nudity and sexual scenes, cut portions from previously banned films, or the entire prohibited films themselves.

The rise of bomba films was attributed to the fact that movies tackled more adult, realistic themes. The ideal of a "true Filipino" was introduced. These films also brought in a new audience for Philippine film; the usual filmgoers, the teenagers who saw the films as "hip", and the youth, who used these films as a means for their own sexual awakenings, the educated, collegiate, and the working-class crowd. On another side, the larger audience of these films were the male devotees, who came to see the sex scenes and left as soon as the last one finished airing. Some films from this era include Ang Saging ni Pacing, Dayukdok (Dir. Luis San Juan; the movie was only approved by the board upon being renamed to Ang Magsasaing ni Pacing), Ang Batuta ni Drakula (Dir. Luis San Juan), Gutom (Dir. Danny Zialcita), Sabik (Dir. Angelito de Guzman), Laman sa Laman (Dirs. Lauro Pacheco, Jose Sibal), and Hayok (Dir. Ruben Abalos) among many other titles.

While the non-ban of these kinds of films led to the liquidation of censorship committees for most countries, this was not the case for the Philippines, likely due to the demand in box office. On February 22, 1970, the theaters Pablace and Mayfair are picketed by protesters who went against bomba movies. In 1972, the Board begins its anti-sex policy, which was backed by the general public who deemed the films as "attributing to the upsurge of crimes by minors and loose morality of youth".

=== The martial law era ===
Film censorship under the martial law dictatorship was undertaken as part of the stifling of free expression and civil rights, during which artists, journalists, activists, and members of the opposition were under threats of sanctions or arrest.

Prior to the administration of Ferdinand Marcos and the declaration of Martial Law in 1972, policing films had been a matter which only went as far as censorship and the non-distribution of movies in the country. The Board of Censorship then had no right to take legal action against any film, director, actor, producing company, or theater that had violated any of its mandates. Cases like these were to be brought up to the local government, who had jurisdiction over legal matters.

On September 27, 1972, Marcos issued Letter of Instructions No. 13, which he claimed would "uphold morality in the youth". However, the ban was instead used to stifle dissent and to maintain the propaganda of the government at the time. Among the films banned were Hubad na Bayani (1977), Manila by Night (1980), Bayan Ko: Kapit sa Patalim (1984), among many others. The letter stated 7 kinds of films that were not to be exhibited in any local theater:

1. Films which tend to incite subversion, insurrection or rebellion against the State;
2. Films which tend to undermine the faith and confidence of the people in their government and/or duly constituted authorities;
3. Films which glorify criminals or condone crimes;
4. Films which serve no other purpose but to satisfy the market for violence or pornography;
5. Films which offend any race or religion;
6. Films which tend to abet the traffic in and use of prohibited drugs;
7. Films contrary to law, public order, morals, good customs, established policies, lawful orders, decrees or edicts; and any or all films which in the judgment of the Board are similarly objectionable and contrary to the letter and spirit of Proclamation No. 1081.

What made this proclamation different from those appointed by the board was that the government now had jurisdiction over bodies that were at fault. It was proclaimed in coordination with the Department of National Defense. In fear of legal action and prosecution, the board tightened their rules, banning 148 imported movies and 50 local movies which displayed negative acts. Films were expected to uphold objectives of the New Society through upholding moral values and ensuring that the ideologies shown did not subvert the peace of the nation and the mind.

Aside from the Letter of Instructions, the board had assumed three more rights apart from the right to cut scenes from movies: the right to (1) encourage, (2) warn, and (3) be consulted. Taking from the British Board of Film Censors, the board started requiring submission of the full script of a movie before it was slated to begin production. This allows the board to warn the producers of possible issues within the script. Due to this, there have been fewer portions cut out of local movies, with 163 of 173 films being approved for general audiences from September 21, 1972, to September 21, 1973. This also resulted in longer, more sophisticated films that wasted less shooting time and production cost. The divide between the government and filmmakers (and in result, the viewing public) became smaller as national responsibility was imbibed in the art of filmmaking in itself.

Filmmakers and other artists protested censorship and the suppression of civil rights. For example, Lino Brocka and other artists organized protests against "arbitrary, senseless censorship" in 1983. They organized the Free the Artist movement, which led to the founding of the Concerned Artists of the Philippines. By 1985, Imee Marcos' Experimental Cinema of the Philippines re-released City After Dark in its original title, Manila by Night, at the Manila Film Center.

=== Movie and Television Review and Classification Board ===
On October 5, 1985, Executive Order No. 876-A was created to reformat the Board of Review for Motion Pictures, leading to the creation of the Movie and Television Review and Classification Board (MTRCB). The board was created only for the purpose of classifying cinematic films and television shows. The board holds 30 members at any given time, with the first chairman after the Executive Order being Manuel "Manoling" Morato, who took office in 1986.

The board classifies movies into 6 categories, listed below:

	Description
G	Viewers of all ages are admitted.
PG	Viewers below 13 years old must be accompanied by a parent or supervising adult.
R-13	Only viewers who are 13 years old and above can be admitted.
R-16	Only viewers who are 16 years old and above can be admitted.
R-18	Only viewers who are 18 years old and above can be admitted.
X	"X-rated" films are not suitable for public exhibition.

== Notable directors ==
Although foreign films were shown in the Philippines since the Spanish period, interest in the creation of local films was not given much attention by the Filipinos. However, the advent of Hollywood films during the American period sparked the interest of Filipinos and eventually led to the boom of filmmakers in the country.

- Jose Nepomuceno is known as the Father of Philippine Movies, and is considered one of the pioneers of Filipino cinema. His first movie entitled Dalagang Bukid (1919), a stage play turned movie, is the first movie produced by a Filipino filmmaker. Along with his brother Jesus, they founded the film company Malayan Movies which later produced over a hundred movies. Some of the titles include La Venganza de Don Silvestre (1920), La Mariposa Negra (1920), and El Capullo Marchito (1921) among others.
- Lino Brocka was a prominent Filipino director who received fame in the 1970s. Growing up, he gained interest in American film which led him to pursue a career in the film industry. Most of Brocka's films revolve around the issues faced by the common Filipino such as poverty, discrimination, and politics. He is also known to be anti-Marcos and created films to protest against Martial Law. Some of his films include Ora Pro Nobis (1989) and Gumapang Ka Sa Lusak (1990) among others. He is a recipient of five Filipino Academy of Movie Arts and Sciences (FAMAS) best director in 1970, 1974, 1975, 1979, and 1990.
- Marilou Diaz-Abaya was a multi-awarded film and TV producer and director who gained fame for her film Jose Rizal (1998). This film also earned her a Best Director Award from the Metro Manila Film Festival. Diaz-Abaya claimed that she used her films and shows as a way to promote social issues in the Philippines, such as the state of the country's democracy. Some of these films include Brutal, Karnal, and Ipaglaban Mo.

== Notable categories ==
=== Independent Filipino cinema ===
Independent Filipino cinema has existed for almost as long as commercialized cinema, but this type of cinema has not been recognized as much, and thus has few historical accounts. Many of the independent films show actual happenings in the society using authentic voices of the people, but oftentimes, these films have been suppressed due to its revelations about social and political realities or marginalized due to its cinematography. These films also sometimes offer valuable historical content.

In its early beginnings, alternative cinemas were documentaries about the Philippines. Jose Nepomuceno was first commissioned to make documentaries about the richest industries in the Philippines, and his most famous one was about the hemp industry. Other alternative films made during 1920–1955 include Old Manila, Tres Sangganos, Intramuros, Jose Rizal, March of the Time Series: The Philippines, and Woodcarving in the Philippines.

Documentary Film/Independent Film	Year	Produced by	Description
Dalagang Bukid	1919	Nepumuceno Brothers	Representations and images of the Americans in the Nepumuceno brothers' perspective after they have anchored themselves in the country.
Tres Sangganos	1920s	Manuel Silos	A short film in 16 millimeters. First feature film of Manuel Silos which had three parts.
Boxing match between Pancho Villa and Clever Sencio	1925	Orient Pictures Corporation (partly owned by Joaquin Pardo de Vera)	It was the first ever boxing match held in the Philippines.
Jose Rizal	1939	Ramon Estella	Biopic

All of the films above were destroyed during World War II. However, in the film archives in Washington DC, only the old film titled March of Time Series: The Philippines by Louis de Rochemont survived.

Film making halted during the Japanese occupation however, some documentaries and newsreels were made such as Laurel Review His Troops (1943), First Session of the National Assembly (1943), New Cabinet Organized (1943), and What Do You Think? (1943).

The 1950s to 1970s saw the rise of the First Independent Film Movement when the production of short films had a substantial increase, and these short films were garnering awards locally and internationally. Furthermore, several film organizations were formed during this time such as the Film Institute of the Philippines, Film Society of the Philippines. Some of the alternative films produced during this time include El Legado, Soul of a Fortress, Mangandingay: A Place of Happiness, The Wall, Mababangong Bangungot, Masinloc, and The Survivor.

The 1970s to 1980s saw the rise of the Second Independent Film Movement where the films produced contained more of the personal creativity of the filmmakers, and films became more ideological.

Independent films became highly politicized in the 1980s with the Marcos dictatorship and the People Power Revolution. The filmmakers of that time sought to innovate ways of expression for their political films as they deal with social reality. Some of the famous independent films of that time include Ang Magpakailanman, Children of the Regime, Revolutions Happen like Refrains in a Song, A Legacy of Violence, And Rain Fell in July, Sugat sa Ugat, The Arrogance of Power, Signos, Kalawang, Sa Maynila, Ynang Bayan: To be a Woman is to Live at a Time of War, Why is Yellow the Middle of the Rainbow, Perfumed Nightmare, Isang Munting Lupa, and Bayani.

Currently, there are a few Filipino film festivals that support independent Filipino films such as Cinemalaya and CineFilipino. These are annual film festivals that screens, invests, promotes, and awards independent Filipino films.

=== Animation ===
Philippine animation, is a body of original cultural and artistic works and styles applied to conventional Filipino storytelling, combined with talent and the appropriate application of classic animation principles, methods, and techniques, which recognizes their relationship with Filipino culture, comics, and films. It also delves into relying on traditional and common Filipino "sense of going about things" or manner of coping with Filipino life and environment.

One of the early pioneers of Philippine animation was Severino "Nonoy" Marcelo, a cartoonist who is responsible for creating various animation works under Marcos' presidency in the 1970s and 1980s, most notably the 1978 television film Tadhana, the first-ever full-length animated film produced in the Philippines. Two decades later, Geirry A. Garccia's Adarna: The Mythical Bird became the Philippines' first feature-length theatrical animated film upon being released at the 1997 Metro Manila Film Festival.

After Tadhana and Adarna, several Filipino animators continued to create their own feature-length works such including Reggie Entienza's Urduja, Robert Quilao's Dayo: Sa Mundo ng Elementalia (both 2008), and Luis C. Suarez's RPG Metanoia (2010), the latter being the first feature-length computer-animated film produced in the country. Later animated films, shifting into more independent form, include Carl Joseph Papa's Manang Biring and Iti Mapukpukaw, and Avid Liongoren's Saving Sally and Hayop Ka!.

=== Historical epics ===
Another staple of the Philippine film industry, historical dramas where part of the mainstream genres of the Philippine cinema, the deep history of the Philippines where the filmmakers are constantly inspired by it. Over the years, there have been many popular films based on history or on historical figures featuring detailed costumes and sets. Both based on real people – like the biographies of José Rizal (1939, 1998), Andrés Bonifacio (1995, 2010, 2012, 2014), Lapulapu (1955, 2002), Antonio Luna (2015) and Gregorio del Pilar (2018); or set during a certain time period – Teniente Rosario (1937), Banaue: Stairway to the Sky (1975), Dugo sa Kapirasong Lupa (1975), Oro, Plata, Mata (1982), Tatlong Taong Walang Diyos (1976) and Quezon's Game (2018).

=== Internationally acclaimed films ===
Over the years, Filipino films have been recognized not only in their own country, but also globally in different countries. Competing with international films, Filipino films have earned many different rewards such as the Golden Lion in the 2016 Venice Film Festival won by Ang Babaeng Humayo (The Woman Who Left) by Lav Diaz, the Audience Choice Award in the Tokyo International Film Festival won by Die Beautiful by Jun Lana, or the Silver Bear Alfred Bauer Prize at the 66th Berlin International Film Festival won by Hele sa Hiwagang Hapis (A Lullaby to the Sorrowful Mystery) also by Lav Diaz. All these films were granted these awards in the year of 2016 among many other Philippine films. In the years before, other films equally gaining recognition internationally include Pamilya Ordinaryo by Eduardo Roy Jr.; Toto by John Paul Su; Taklub by Brillante Mendoza; Metro Manila by Sean Ellis; Foster Child by Brillante Mendoza and Closer to Home by Joseph Nobile.

== Film associations and organizations ==
Notable local film associations and groups include:

- Metro Manila Film Festival

The Metro Manila Film Festival is an annual film festival held in Metro Manila, Philippines. The festival takes place from Christmas Day (December 25) and concludes at the first weekend in January of the following year. The MMFF has taken place every year since its inception in 1975. The 2016 event was the 42nd festival in its history. Throughout the festival, only Filipino Films, which are approved by the jurors of the MMFF, are shown in cinemas. No foreign films are shown in Metro Manila cinemas during the festival (except IMAX, 4DX, and select 3D cinemas). This has been a tradition ever since the establishment of the festival's precursor, “Manila Film Festival” in 1966 by former Manila Mayor Antonio Villegas. The festival is accompanied with an awards ceremony. Over the years, films such as Yamashita: The Tiger's Treasure, One More Try, Walang Forever, and Sunday Beauty Queen have received the Best Picture Award.

- Pista ng Pelikulang Pilipino

The Pista ng Pelikulang Filipino (or PPP) is a film festival held in theaters nationwide. Its inaugural season was held on August 16–22, 2017, coinciding with the Buwan ng Wika. Similar to the Metro Manila Film Festival, foreign movies will not be shown in theaters (except IMAX, 4DX, VIP (starting from 2nd edition), and large format 3D theaters) and films approved by the jury will be shown. It is organized by the Film Development Council of the Philippines in association with theaters nationwide.

The inaugural awardees in the competition include: Mikhail Red's Birdshot (Critic's Choice), Victor Villanueva's Patay na si Hesus (Jury's Choice) and Jason Paul Laxamana's 100 Tula para kay Stella (Audience Choice).

- Film Academy of the Philippines

The Film Academy of the Philippines was established in 1981 and is considered the Philippine counterpart of the United States' Academy of Motion Picture Arts and Sciences. It serves as the general organization of the various film-related guilds in the country that help in the organizing and supervising of film activities.

- Filipino Society of Cinematographers

Established on February 27, 1970, it serves as an "educational, cultural and professional organization of cinematographers".

- Film Development Council of the Philippines

Formed on June 7, 2002, the Film Development Council of the Philippines can be found under the Office of the President. It ensures that the economic, cultural and educational aspects of film are represented locally and internationally.

- National Film Archives of the Philippines

The National Film Archives of the Philippines houses the history of Philippine Cinema and protects the country's cultural legacy in film through the preservation, retrieval, and restoration of film negatives, prints and other film related material and promotes these to provide a wider appreciation of the cinema history by making them available to the public.

- Movie Workers Welfare Foundation Inc.

The Movie Workers Welfare Foundation Inc. or MOWELFUND was organized and established in 1974 by former President Joseph E. Estrada who was then president of the Philippine Motion Picture Producers Association (PMPPA). Its primary purpose is to provide aid to movie workers such as medical, livelihood and housing benefits.

== Yearly revenue ==
Year	No. of Films	Revenue in US$	PhP vs US$	Revenue PhP
2007	165	$86.60M	46.01	Php 3.984B
2008	170	$100.97M	44.32	Php 4.475B
2009	161	$103.39M	47.64	Php 4.925B
2010	149	$123.86M	45.11	Php 5.587B
2011	152	$138.03M	43.31	Php 5.978B
2012	156	$158.80M	42.23	Php 6.706B
2013	177	$166.41M	42.45	Php 7.064B

== See also ==
- ABS-CBN Film Archives
- ABS-CBN Film Restoration Project
- Asian cinema
- Cinema of the world
- East Asian cinema
- Film awards bodies in the Philippines
- History of cinema
- List of Filipino actors
- List of Filipina actresses
- List of films about Martial Law in the Philippines
- List of films banned in the Philippines
- List of highest-grossing films in the Philippines
- List of highest-grossing Filipino films
- List of Philippine co-produced films and television series
- List of Philippine film studios
- List of Philippine films
- List of Philippine submissions for the Academy Award for Best International Feature Film
- Metro Manila Film Festival
- Southeast Asian cinema
- World cinema
