= Dalagang Bukid =

- Directed by: José Nepomuceno
- Based on: Dalagang Bukid by Hermogenes Ilagan and Leon Ignacio
- Produced by: José Nepomuceno
- Starring: Atang de la Rama; Marceliano Ilagan
- Cinematography: José Nepomuceno
- Distributed by: Malayan Movies
- Release date: September 12, 1919
- Country: Philippines
- Language: Silent
- Budget: ₱25,000
- Box office: ₱90,000

Dalagang Bukid (English: Country Maiden) is a 1919 Filipino silent film. Directed by José Nepomuceno, it is recognized as the first full-length Filipino-produced and directed feature film. An adaptation of the Tagalog sarsuwela of the same name by Hermogenes Ilagan, the film stars Atang de la Rama and Marceliano Ilagan, both of whom reprise their roles from the original sarsuwela production.

All of Nepomuceno's films, including Dalagang Bukid and its sequel La Venganza de Don Silvestre, are lost.

== Plot ==
Angelita (Atang de la Rama), a young flower vendor who works in front of a cabaret named Dalagang Bukid, and poor law student Cipriano (Marceliano Ilagan) are in love. However, Angelita is forced by her parents to marry a wealthy loan shark, Don Silvestre, as they need money to pay for their gambling habit and other vices. Angelita's parents grant Don Silvestre permission to marry their daughter after he arranges for her to win a beauty contest. Before the coronation, Angelita and Cipriano wed in secret at Santa Cruz Church. They travel together to the coronation pageant only to inform Don Silvestre that they are now married. The film ends with the elderly loan shark fainting upon hearing the news.

== Cast ==
- Atang de la Rama as Angelita
- Marceliano Ilagan as Cipriano

== Production ==
Prior to Dalagang Bukid, several foreigners had directed and produced films in the Philippines, including Edward Meyer Gross's Vida y Muerte del Dr. José Rizal (1912) and Albert Yearsley's Walang Sugat (1912). Inspired by the foreign filmmakers, photo studio owner José Nepomuceno became interested in moving pictures and purchased equipment from Gross's Rizalina Film Manufacturing Company. On May 15, 1917, Nepomuceno set up the film production company Malayan Movies.

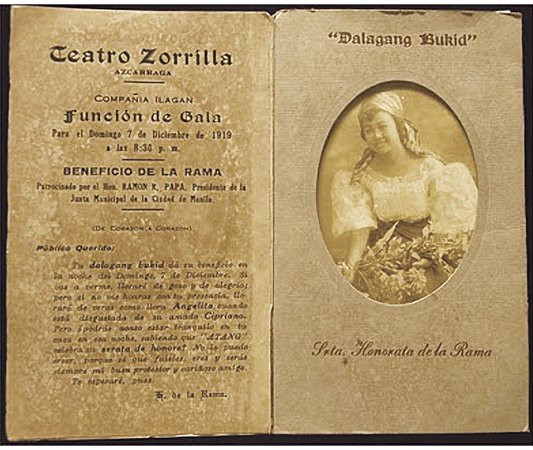
A 1919 invitation to a performance of Dalagang Bukid at Teatro Zorilla starring Atang de la Rama (pictured).

After producing short newsreels and documentaries, Nepomuceno decided to direct and produce an adaptation of Hermogenes Ilagan and Leon Ignacio's popular sarsuwela Dalagang Bukid. The sarsuwela was first staged in 1917 by Compañia de Zarzuela Ilagan at the Teatro Zorilla. It starred Atang de la Rama, who reprised her role in Nepomuceno's film adaptation.

== Release ==
The film premiered on September 12, 1919, at Teatro de la Comedia before moving to the Empire Theatre. Although it is a silent film, during its theatrical run, its lead actress Atang de la Rama would stand in the theater's wings to sing the theme song "Nabasag ang Banga" (The Clay Pot Broke) as the film played.

The film was a box office success, making a ₱90,000 return after a week of screening.

== Reception ==
The film received mixed reviews upon release. The Manila Nueva found that it to be "a realistic portrait of many Filipino families, although its pessimistic tone is a bit exaggerated." Meanwhile, The Citizen criticized the film for being "all that the play is not" and "an incoherent jumble of scenes that border on the childish and the ridiculous and the exotic."

== Themes ==
Despite its earlier negative review, a contemporary article published in The Citizen associated Dalagang Bukid with the rise of a national consciousness in cinema. It suggested that the film would be "the forerunner of many more films that have for their motif the depicting of the Philippine life and social conditions peculiar to the type of our culture and civilization." The article added that "the motion picture appears to have some bearing on the subject" of Philippine independence from American occupation.

Film historian Nadi Tofighian suggests that the choice of a Tagalog sarsuwela as source material for his first film meant José Nepomuceno wanted to show typical Filipino life against growing "Americanisation." He draws attention to the "central role and symbolic value" of Filipino national hero José Rizal, whose portrait hangs in the home of the film's heroine Angelita.

Nepomuceno himself declared that his film company's purpose was to make films "to the conditions and tastes of the country," which Filipino film historian Nick Deocampo considers a pitch towards nationalism against the influence of America. Deocampo highlights, however, that the declaration fails to consider the Spanish colonial influence on the source material and the subsequent film.

== Sequel ==
In the original sarsuwela production, Don Silvestre begrudgingly gives the young couple his blessing. In the film adaptation, he merely faints upon hearing the news of their marriage. This gave way for the production of a sequel, La Venganza de Don Silvestre, which premiered a month later on October 12, 1919.

== Legacy ==
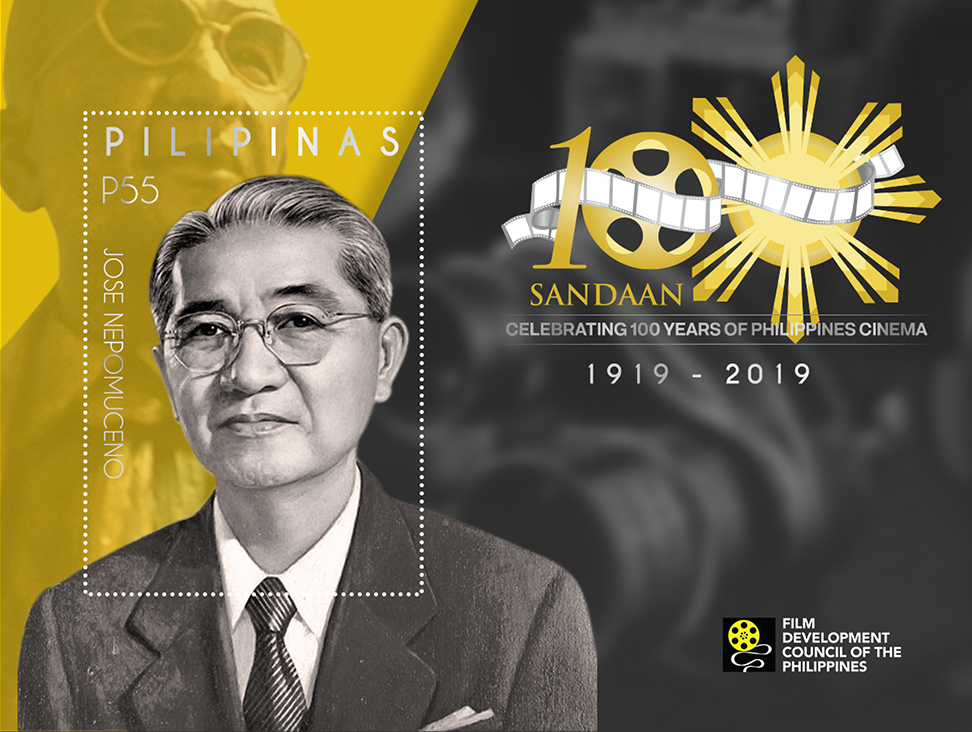
A 2019 commemorative stamp sheet featuring director José Nepomuceno in celebration of a century of Philippine cinema.

The film was officially recognized as the first Filipino-produced and directed film by the Philippine government in the 2018 Proclamation No. 622. The Proclamation declared September 12, 2019, to September 11, 2020, the centennial year of Philippine cinema. The dates were chosen as Dalagang Bukid would celebrate its centennial that year.
