= Back Door to Hell =

1964 film

- Directed by: Monte Hellman
- Screenplay by: John Hackett; Richard A. Guttman
- Produced by: Fred Roos
- Starring: Jimmie Rodgers; Jack Nicholson; John Hackett
- Cinematography: Mars Rasca
- Edited by: Fely Crisostomo
- Music by: Mike Velarde
- Production companies: Lippert Pictures; Medallion Films
- Distributed by: 20th Century Fox
- Release date: November 1964
- Running time: 69 minutes
- Countries: United States; Philippines
- Language: English
- Budget: $80,000

Back Door to Hell is a 1964 American-Filipino war film concerning a three-man team of United States soldiers preparing the way for Gen. MacArthur's World War II return to the Philippines by destroying a Japanese communications center. It was produced on a small budget and received mediocre reviews.

John Hackett wrote the script on the boat from the US to the Philippines. Jack Nicholson was writing the script to Flight to Fury at the same time.

Hellman, Nicholson and Hackett also made the film back to back with Flight to Fury (1964).

== Plot ==
Three American servicemen land in the Philippines and request the aid of a group of guerillas in the fight against the Japanese. The Japanese secret police learn about this and hold the children of the village hostage, threatening to kill one of them every hour until the Americans are handed over. However, the Americans and guerilla fighters rescue the children and capture some Japanese prisoners after a difficult battle. When Lt. Craig hesitates and does not shoot two escaping Japanese, Jersey says that he is cracking under pressure. The Americans unsuccessfully interrogate the prisoners for information about beach defenses and troop movements, but Paco, leader of the guerillas, manages to obtain the information through torture. Lt. Craig is distraught that the prisoners are then executed by the guerillas.

The bandit leader Ramundo offers information about Japanese positions and movements in exchange for the Americans' radio. When the Americans are unable to give it to him immediately because they need it to send information about the Japanese positions and movements, Ramundo shoots the radio and flees. The Americans sneak into a Japanese shortwave station, but Burnett is killed after transmitting the information through Morse code. Paco provides cover fire so that Jersey can carry Burnett's body away, but then Paco is also shot and killed. Ships of American troops arrive to fight the Japanese, but Lt. Craig and Jersey sorrowfully remember the dead along with Maria and the other guerillas.

== Cast ==
- Jimmie Rodgers as Lt. Craig
- Jack Nicholson as Burnett
- John Hackett as Jersey
- Annabelle Huggins as Maria
- Conrad Maga as Paco
- Johnny Monteiro as Ramundo
- Joe Sison as Japanese Capt.
- Henry Duval as Garde
- Ben Perez
- Vic Uematsu

== Production ==
Robert Lippert had been impressed by Jack Nicholson's Thunder Island so gave Nicholson and his friends Monte Hellman and John Hackett $160,000 and $400 a week salary to make two films on location in the Philippines. The three men and Hellman's wife and child traveled 28 days by ship via Hawaii, Hong Kong and Japan with the three working on the screenplays to both films on the voyage. Back Door to Hell was a rewrite on one of Lippert's existing screenplays.

Popular singer Jimmie Rodgers had a substantial part in the film, and co-financed it.

The film, directed by Monte Hellman, was shot on location in Vinzons, Camarines Norte, Philippines, giving it an authentic look. The same plot was reused in Ib Melchior's Ambush Bay (1966) with a larger Marine patrol destroying a minefield prior to the American and Filipino invasion of the Philippines.
