= Carmen Concha =

- Born: October 28, 1902
- Occupation: Film director, novelist, film producer, costume designer, screenwriter

Carmen Concha (born October 28, 1902) was a Filipino film director, producer, screenwriter, costume designer, and novelist. She was one of the earliest female film directors in the Philippines.

Carmen Concha was born on October 28, 1902.

She was the producer and costume designer for the silent film Oriental Blood (1930), directed by Carlos Vander Tolosa and starring Jose Corazon de Jesus, Atang de la Rama, Purita Clariño, and Annie Harris. She directed three sound films based on her own stories, using the pseudonym Ciciel for her screenplays. In Nagkaisang Landas (Paths That Met, 1939), starring Rogelio de la Rosa, Reynaldo Dante, and Lydia Leynes, Leynes plays the neglected wife of a doctor who causes a town scandal. Yaman ng Mahirap (Wealth of the Poor, 1939), starring Angel Esmerelda, Tito Arevalo, Mercedes Ponce, and Antonina Hernandez, depicted the killing of a striking factory worker. Pangarap (Dream, 1940), starring Angel Esmeralda, Purita Santamaria, Tita Duran, Hermogenes Ilagan, and Horacio Morelos, features a rich boy who is disinherited after he marries a poor girl.

Concha went on to serve as the costume designer for a number of films, including Principe Amante (Prince Amante), 1950; and Ang Prinsesa at ang Pulubi (The Princess and the Pauper), Tres Muskiteros (Three Musketeers), and Bernardo Carpio, 1952, and stage plays at the Ateneo de Manila. She wrote a novel, Aklat ng Buhay (Book of Life), that was serialized in Bulaklak Magazine and was adapted for radio and film, the latter directed by Lamberto V. Avellana.

== Filmography ==
- Nagkaisang Landas (Paths That Met, 1939)
- Yaman ng Mahirap (Wealth of the Poor, 1939)
- Pangarap (Dream, 1940)
