= Annabelle Huggins =

Filipino actress

Annabelle Huggins (born 1943) is a retired Filipino actress. In 1962, Huggins was kidnapped by taxi driver Ruben Ablaza, whose later arrest and trial became highly publicized. In 1964, she starred in the Filipino-American war film Back Door to Hell alongside singer Jimmie Rodgers and Jack Nicholson.

== Early life ==
Annabelle was born to an American-Filipino father and Filipino mother. She was later raised by her aunt and uncle along with her siblings, wherein her aunt treated her as her own child. In 1958 she dropped out of high school to work in a billiard hall where she met Ruben Ablaza.

== Career ==
She debuted in the film Adonis Abril (1963) with Nestor De Villa, Back Door to Hell with Jack Nicholson (her Hollywood debut), and also Siyam na Buhay ni Martin Pusa (1964) with Joseph Estrada.

== Kidnapping ==
On 13 October 1962, 19-year-old Huggins reported that she was taken against her will to Hagonoy, Bulacan and raped by Ruben Ablaza, a portly taxi driver, who plotted the abduction with two others, Lauro Ocampo and Jose "Totoy Pulis" Leoncio. The incident was repeated on March 22, 1963, and this time, Huggins was reportedly kidnapped from Makati and taken first to Caloocan and then to Bulacan, a more serious offense.

== Trial ==
When Ablaza was apprehended and tried in court, he contended that the two were in love, that she freely went with him and what he did "was the vogue of the time". The most awaited part of the trial was when the principal witness, Huggins, testified before Fiscal Pascual Kliatchko and a curious courtroom crowd.

In 1969, Ablaza claimed that he and Annabelle were a couple. Ablaza and the two men were found guilty for kidnapping and rape, and were sentenced to death. While the two men were executed, Ablaza's death sentence was cancelled by then-sitting president Ferdinand Marcos twice and reduced to life imprisonment. He spent most of his life imprisoned in New Bilibid Prison until his release in the late 1990s.

Shortly after his release, Ablaza died of natural causes.

== In media ==
Two films were made about her kidnapping by Ruben Ablaza. In 1963, Eddie Garcia directed the film Ang Mananaggol ni Ruben, starring Lolita Rodriguez as Huggins and Mario Montenegro as Ablaza. The film was initially released in September 1963 with a controversial appearance by Ablaza himself, and was later recut and re-released in November as simply Ang Manananggol upon the request of the Board of Censors for Motion Pictures with the Ablaza appearance removed. In 1995, director Carlo J. Caparas made The Annabelle Huggins Story-Ruben Ablaza Tragedy: Mea Culpa, starring Cesar Montano as Ablaza and Dawn Zulueta as Huggins. The real Ruben Ablaza appears as himself still serving his life sentence at the end of the film.

== See also ==
- Maggie dela Riva
