= List of Philippine film studios =

This is a list of film studios and film production companies in the Philippines from 1919 up to the present.

- 3 Star Pictures
- 7K Entertainment, Inc.
- 901 Studios
- Above-the-line Productions
- ABS-CBN Studios
- A.C.C.S. Film Productions (Avanguard Creatives)
- Acuña-Zaldariaga
- A.G.P Film Production
- A.L.B. Production
- A.M. Production
- APT Entertainment
- A. R. Production (Armando Rodriguez Production)
- A.V.P. Production
- AgostoDos Pictures
- Agrix Film
- Al Martin Pictures
- Aliud Productions
- Amaritz Productions
- Ambassador Picture
- Americo-Filipino
- Angora Films
- Anima
- Associated Artists
- Associated Theaters
- Atic Inc.
- ATB 5
- Athena Productions
- Artikulo Uno Productions
- Avellana and Company
- BAS Film Productions Inc.
- Banahaw Pictures
- Balatbat Productions
- Bonanza Productions
- Bancom Audiovision
- Bayani
- Bayanihan Pictures
- Bentria Productions Film & Video Reproduction Services
- Bigfoot Studios
- Binatang Parang Films
- Black Cap Pictures, Inc.
- Black Sheep Productions
- Broadway Production
- Buchi Boy Entertainment
- ByTheSea Philippines
- Camerrol Film Productions
- Camia Production
- Carlos Vander Tolosa Production
- Cervatina Filipina
- CG Films International
- Cineko Productions
- CineMedia
- Cinex Films Inc.
- Cine Suerte
- Corazon Roque Production
- Cornerstone Entertainment, Inc.
- Curve Entertainment
- D'Lanor Picture
- Dalisay Picture
- Davian International Ltd.
- DES Production
- DIGITANK Studios
- Diosa Production
- Diwata Films
- Dulaney Film Productions
- Eduque Production
- Eastern Pictures
- E.K. Films
- El Niño Films
- Emar Picture
- Estrella & Co.,
- Excelsior Films
- Everlasting Pictures, Inc
- Everybody's Production
- Experimental Cinema of the Philippines
- Exploration Pictures Corp.
- FPJ Productions
- Filcudoma
- Filipinas Picture
- Filippine Productions
- Film Entertainment Exponent
- F. Puzon Film Enterprises Inc.
- GAMA Studios
- G.M. Picture
- GMA Pictures
- Good Harvest Unlimited
- Gretas Production
- Hemisphere Picture
- Hollywood Far-East
- Ilonggo Productions
- Imus Productions
- Jafere Production
- J.E. Production
- JBC Film Production
- Jela Productions
- Jescom Films
- Joaquin Film Company
- John-John Films Production
- Jose Nepomuceno Productions
- Karilagan Production
- Kayumanggi Cinema Inc.
- Kinavesa International
- Kislap-Tagalog Picture
- King Abalos Films
- K Productions (formerly Kris Aquino Productions)
- Larry Santiago Production
- Lawin
- Lea Productions
- Lebran Productions
- Libran Motion Picture
- Liliw Productions
- Liwayway Films
- LL Production
- Lonewolf Films, Inc.
- LSJ Production
- Luis F. Nolasco Production
- Luzon Motion Pictures
- Luz V. Minda
- LVN Pictures
- M.B.M. Film Production
- Mabuhay Cinema
- Magna East Production
- Malayan Movies
- Malayan Pictures Corporation
- Manansala Films
- Manila Talkatone
- MAVX Productions, Inc.
- MC Production
- McLaurin Bros.
- MEDA Productions
- Mentorque, Inc.
- Milagrosa
- MM Production
- Monserrat Enterprises
- Motion Picture Casting Corporation
- Moviestars
- Movietec
- MQ Studios
- M - Zet TV Productions, Inc.
- N²
- Nathan Studios, Inc.
- Neo Film
- Nepomuceno Productions
- Nolasco Bros.
- Novastar
- N.V. Production
- OctoArts Films
- Oriental Moving Picture
- Oriental Pictures
- Palaris Pictures
- Panay Negros Productions
- Pangilinan Productions
- Paragon Pictures
- Parlatone Hispano Filipino
- Pauline's Production
- Pedro Vera Pictures
- People's Picture
- Philartech Productions
- Philippine National Pictures
- Philippines Artist Guild
- Philippine Paradise Pictures
- Poe-Zshornack Production
- Premiere Productions
- Project 8 Corner San Joaquin Projects, Inc. (Project 8 Projects)
- Quantum Films, Inc.
- Red Epic Production
- RDR Productions
- Reality Entertainment
- Regal Entertainment, Inc.
- Rizalina Film Manufacturing Company
- Rosas Production
- Royal Film
- R.T.G. Production
- RV Production
- RVQ Productions
- Sampaguita Pictures
- San Francisco del Monte Pictures
- Sanggumay Pictures
- Seiko Films
- Sine Screen
- Skylight Films
- Sinagtala Films
- Silver Star Film Company
- Sotang Bastos Production
- Solar Films International
- Solar Studios, Inc.
- Sta.Maria
- Spring Films
- Star Cinema
- Supreme
- SVS Pictures
- Tagalog Ilang-Ilang Production
- Tamaraw Picture
- TBA Studios
- Teamwork Productions
- Ten17P
- The IdeaFirst Company
- TINCAN
- Topaz Production
- Tuko Film Productions
- T-Rex Entertainment
- United Philippine Artists
- Unitel Straight Shooters (UXS, Inc.)
- Utmost Creatives Motion Picture Projection Services
- Vera-Perez Productions
- Virgo Productions
- Vision Film
- Vitri Film
- V Rich Films International
- Viva Films
- Violett Films
- V.S. Film
- Wack-Wack Pictures
- Waling-Waling
- Wild World Entertainment
- X'Otic Films
- Zultana International
- Studio Cuento
