= Pangarap =

- Directed by: Carmen Concha
- Release date: 1940
- Country: Philippines
- Language: Tagalog

Pangarap is a 1940 Filipino drama film directed by Carmen Concha. It stars Tita Duran, Angel Esmeralda and Benny Mack.
