= Filipino Society of Cinematographers =

Professional organization of cinematographers

- Founded: 1970
- Headquarters: OctoArts Building, Panay Avenue, Quezon City, Philippines
- Location: Philippines
- Key people: Elmer Heresco Despa - President; Roman B. Theodossis - Vice President; Rush Borja - Secretary; Brijon Ocampo Gonzales - Treasurer; Melencio B. Dapilos - Auditor; Andrew Topacio - PRO; Jess Lapid Jr./ Irish Lloyd F. Lapid -Chairman Board of Director; George Toralba - Board of Director - FAP Representative; Luke Miraflor - Board of Director; Roberto Z. De Vera - Board of Director; Rahaji Baluyot Retumban - Board of Director; Ver Jacinto - Board of Director; Czarina Berbano - Board of Director

The Filipino Society of Cinematographer (FSC) is an educational, cultural, and professional organization of cinematographers established on February 27, 1970.

In 2010, the FSC in cooperation with the National Commission for Culture and the Arts of the Philippines held the first Advance HD Cinematography and Digital Filmmaking Workshop in Batangas.
