= La vida de José Rizal =

La vida de Jose Rizal
- Directed by: Edward Gross
- Written by: Edward Gross
- Produced by: Harry Brown
- Starring: Honorio Lopez; Titay Molina; Chananay
- Cinematography: Charles Martin
- Distributed by: Rizalina Photoplay Company
- Release date: August 23, 1912
- Running time: 60 minutes
- Country: Philippines
- Language: Silent

La vida de José Rizal (The life of Jose Rizal), released in 1912, was the first feature film produced in the Philippines. It was however not the first film released in the country—a rival film, El fusilamiento de Dr. José Rizal, was released on August 23, one day earlier. La Vida is a silent film that depicts the life of José Rizal, the country's national hero, from his birth to his execution in Luneta in December 1896.

Americans Harry Brown (producer), Charles Martin (cinematographer), and Edward Gross (scenery), founded the Rizalina Photoplay Company in 1912 to produce the film, which was adapted from a 1905 stage play by Gross. Containing 22 scenes, the movie's film had a length of 5,000 feet.

The film, together with its rival, garnered financial success and the producers were encouraged to produce other Filipino-themed films.

== Plot ==
The history tells a biograph life of Filipino Hero Jose Rizal.

== Cast ==
- Honorio Lopez as José Rizal
- Titay Molina as María Clara
- Chananay as Teodora Alonso Realonda
