= Hermogenes Ilagan =

Hermogenes Ilagan (19 April 1873 in Bigaa, Bulacan – 27 February 1943) was a Filipino tenor, writer, stage actor, and playwright. He was a descendant of Francisco Baltazar. His talent in singing made him popular in the field of theater arts. He became known as the Father of Tagalog Zarzuela and the Father of Philippine Zarzuela.

== Career ==
Ilagan was a tiple (treble or soprano) and lead singer for a church in Bigaa, Bulacan. Because of Ilagan's talent, a parish priest in Bigaa, Bulacan brought Ilagan and his family to Manila. He became the singer for the Santa Cruz Church. In return, Ilagan was able to study at the Ateneo Municipal de Manila (now known as Ateneo de Manila University). Although not able to finish schooling, Ilagan became a member of a zarzuela troupe (theater performers) from Spain. During the Spanish–American War, the Spanish performers went back to Spain, but Ilagan maintained his liking for the zarzuela, and later pioneered productions of stage drama in the form of Philippine zarzuelas. His forty years of involvement in the field of zarzuela created the period known as the Golden Age of Philippine Theater. In 1902, Ilagan established the Compania Lirico-Dramatica Tagala de Gatchalian y Ilagan, also known as Compania Ilagan, the first zarzuela troupe in the Philippines. Ilagan's zarzuelas have melodramatic, comic, romantic, and political qualities.

== Works ==
Among the zarzuelas that Ilagan wrote and produced were:

- Ang Buhay nga Naman (That's How Life Is)
- Ang Buwan ng Oktubre (The Month of October)
- Bill de Divorcio (Divorce Bill)
- Dahil kay Ina (Because of Mother)
- Dalagang Bukid (Country Maiden)
- Dalawang Hangal (Two Fools)
- Después de Dios, el Dinero (After God, the Money)
- Ilaw ng Katotohanan (Light of Truth)
- Kagalingan ng Bayan (Country's Benefit)
- Venus (Ang Operang Putol) (Venus, The Incomplete Opera)
- Wagas na Pag-ibig (True Love)
- Sangla ni Rita, isang Uno't Cero (Rita's Pawnage, a One and [a] Zero)
- Centro Pericultura (Periculture Center)
- Panarak ni Rosa (alternatively known as Punyal ni Rosa) (Rosa's Dagger)
- Lucha Electoral (Electoral Fight)
