= List of awards and nominations received by Daniel Padilla =

Daniel Padilla awards and nominations
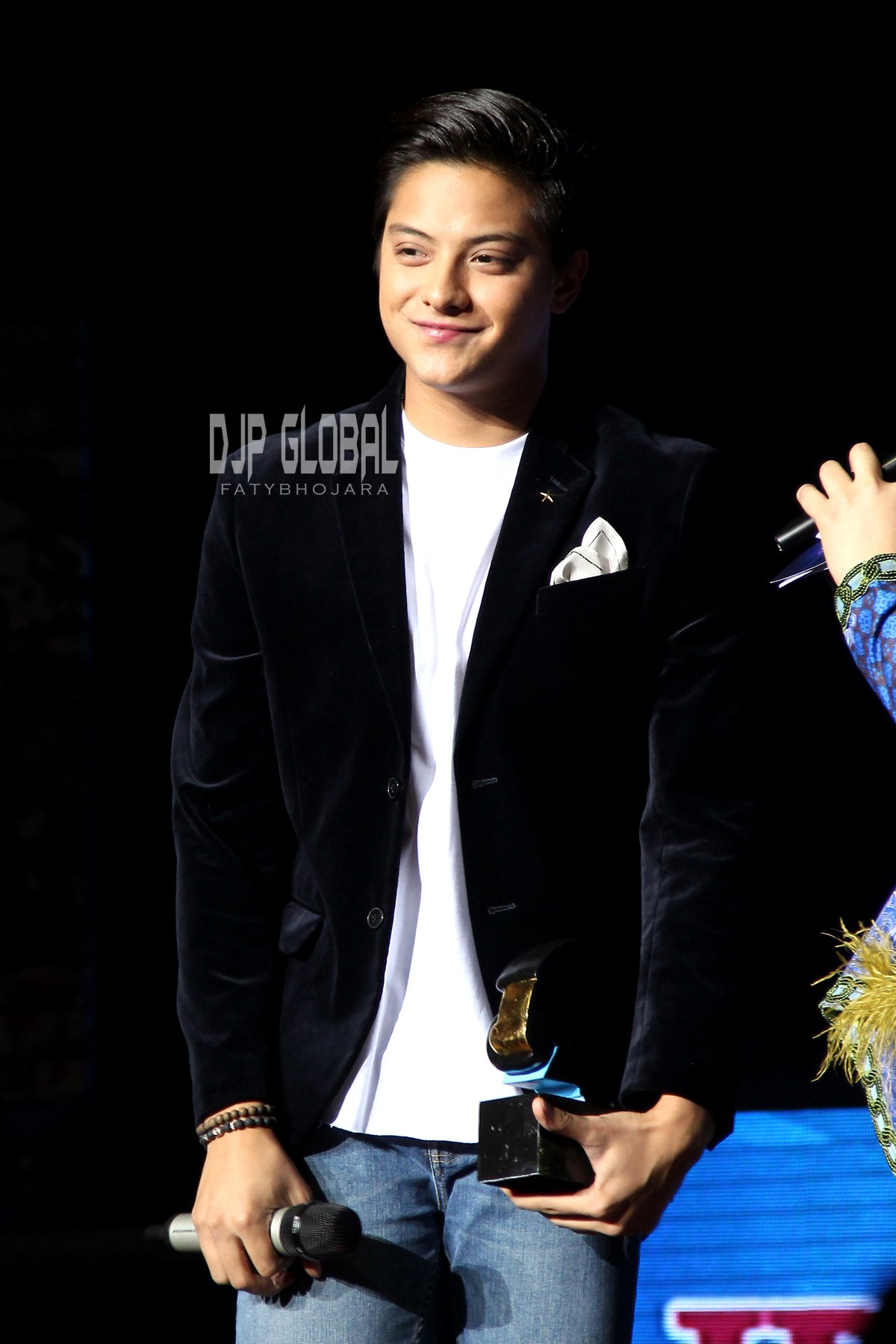
- Padilla at the 2016 MOR Pinoy Music Awards.
Awards and nominations
Award	Wins	Nominations
World Music Awards	-	3
Nickelodeon Kids' Choice Awards	1	1
Awit Awards	2	3
PMPC Star Awards For Music	3	12
FAMAS Awards	2	4
Metro Manila Film Festival	1	1
Young Critics Circle	-	1
PMPC Star Awards For TV & Movies	2	3
GMMSF Box-Office Entertainment Awards	11	-

Totals (Note: Certain award groups do not simply award one winner. They acknowledge several different recipients, have runners-up, and have third place. Since this is a specific recognition and is different from losing an award, runner-up mentions are considered wins in this award tally. For simplification and to avoid errors, each award in this list has been presumed to have had a prior nomination.)
- Wins: 95

This is a list of awards, nominations, recognitions and achievements received by Daniel Padilla during his career.

== International Awards ==
=== 100 Asian Heartthrobs ===
Year	Category	Host	Result	Ref.
2018	100 Asian Heartthrobs of 2018	Starmometer	Rank 4th	

=== Kids' Choice Awards ===
The Nickelodeon Kids' Choice Awards, also known as the KCAs or Kids Choice Awards, is an annual awards show that airs on the Nickelodeon cable channel, which is usually held on a Saturday night in late March or early April, that honors the year's biggest television, movie, and music acts, as voted by Nickelodeon viewers.

Year	Category	Host country	Result	Ref.
2015	Favorite Asian Act	Forum, Inglewood, California	Nominated	
2015	Global Slime Star	Forum, Inglewood, California	Won	

=== Face of the Year Awards ===
Year	Notable Works	Category	Host country	Result	Qualifications	Ref.
2015	Got to Believe	Best Foreign Actor	Vietnam	Won	Fanbase and Online Voting	
2017	Pangako Sa 'Yo	Best Foreign Actor	Vietnam	Won	Fanbase and Online Voting	

=== Independent Critics ===
Year	Category	Host	Result	Ref.
2016	100 Most Handsome Faces of 2016	TC Candler	Rank 78th	

=== World Music Awards ===
The World Music Awards honours the best-selling most popular recording artists from every continent. The World Music Awards are presented on sales merit and voted by the public on the Internet. There is no jury involved and the Awards truly reflect the most popular artists as they are determined by the actual fans who vote and buy the records.

Year	Category	Host country	Result	Ref.
2013	World's Best Male Artist	Monaco	Nominated	
2013	World's Best Live Act	Monaco	Nominated	
2013	World's Best Entertainer of the Year	Monaco	Nominated	

=== Seoul International Drama Awards ===
The Seoul International Drama Awards (SDA) is an annual event held in Seoul, South Korea, that recognizes excellence in television drama productions worldwide. The awards ceremony, also known as simply SDA, features an international competition, international invitation, and awards for the best Korean dramas, international actors or actresses. This award is determined by online fan votes, with nominees typically from five Asian countries and regions. Daniel Padilla has been twice nominated for Outstanding Asian Star nomination at Seoul International Drama Awards.

Year	Category	Host country	Result	Ref.
2023	Outstanding Asian Star	South Korea	Outstanding Asian Star (Nominated with Kathryn Bernardo, for his role in "2 Good 2 be True")	

Year	Category	Host country	Result	Ref.
2025	Outstanding Asian Star	South Korea	Outstanding Asian Star (for his role in "Incognito") Won	

== Music ==
=== ASAP 24k Gold Awards ===
Year	Notable Works	Category	Result	Ref.
2013	Daniel Padilla (EP)	Male Artist Awardee	Won	

=== ASAP 8th Platinum Circle Awards ===
Year	Notable Works	Category	Result	Ref.
2013	Daniel Padilla (EP)	Single Platinum Awardee	Won	

=== Awit Awards ===
The Awit Awards is an expression of the Filipino's undying passion for music - music etched in every Filipino's heart. Awit Awards is a prestigious award-giving body, spearheaded by PARI (The Philippine Association of The Record Industry, INC.), that gives recognition to Filipino performing artists and people behind the making of Filipino recorded music.

Year	Notable Works	Category	Result	Ref.
2013	"Grow Old with You"	Best Performance by a New Male Recording Artist	Nominated	
2013	Daniel Padilla	Best Selling Album of the Year	Won	
2014	DJP	Album of the Year	Nominated	
2014	DJP	Best Selling Album of the Year	Won	
2016	"Perfect Christmas"	Best Christmas Recording	Nominated	

=== Himig Handog ===
Year	Notable Works	Category	Result	Ref.
2013	Nasa Iyo Na Ang Lahat	Star Record's Buyer Choice	Won	.
2013	Nasa Iyo Na Ang Lahat	Tambayan 101.9 Listener's Choice	Won	.
2013	Nasa Iyo Na Ang Lahat	MOR Listener's Choice	Won	.
2013	Nasa Iyo Na Ang Lahat	MYX Best Music Video	Won	.
2014	Simpleng Tulad Mo	MOR Listener's Choice	Won	
2014	Simpleng Tulad Mo	ABS-CBN Subscriber's Choice Award	Won	
2019	Mabagal	MOR Philippines Choice Awards	Won	
2019	Mabagal	MYX Choice for Best Music Video	Won	
2019	Mabagal	One Music PH choice for Favorite Interpreter	Won	
2019	Mabagal	Star Music choice for Best Produced Track	Won	
2019	Mabagal	Most Streamed Track	Won	

=== Myx Music Awards ===
The MYX Music Awards is an accolade presented by the cable channel Myx to honor the biggest hitmakers in the Philippines. The winners in 17 major categories decided via SMS text messaging by 2010 it is 60% fan votes through internet and 40% artists votes.

Year	Notable Works	Category	Result	Ref.
2013	Himself	Favorite New Artist	Won	
2013	"Prinsesa"	Favorite Remake	Nominated	
2013	Himself	Favorite MYX Celebrity VJ	Nominated	
2014	Himself	Favorite Artist	Nominated	
2014	Himself	Favorite Male Artist	Nominated	
2014	"Nasa Iyo Na Ang Lahat"	Favorite Song	Nominated	
2015	Himself	Favorite Male Artist	Won	
2015	"Simpleng Tulad Mo"	Favorite Song	Won	
2015	"Simpleng Tulad Mo"	Favorite Mellow Video	Nominated	
2015	Himself	Favorite Artist	Nominated	
2015	"Unlimited and Free"	Favorite Media Soundtrack	Nominated	
2016	"I Got You (I Feel Good)"	Favorite Remake	Nominated	
2016	"Nothing's Gonna Stop Us Now" (with Morissette)	Favorite Media Soundtrack	Nominated	
2020	"Mabagal"	Mellow Video of the Year	Won	
2020	"Mabagal" (with Moira Dela Torre)	Collaboration of the Year	Won	

=== PMPC Star Awards for Music ===
Year	Notable Works	Category	Result	Ref.
2013	Daniel Padilla	New Male Recording Artist of the Year	Won	
2013	DJP	Pop Album of the Year	Won	
2013	"Nasa Iyo Na Ang Lahat"	Song of the Year	Nominated	
2013	Daniel Live!	Concert of the Year	Nominated	
2013	Daniel Live!	Male Concert Performer of the Year	Nominated	
2014	I Heart You	Male Pop Artist of the Year	Won	
2014	I Heart You	Male Recording Artist of the Year	Nominated	
2014	DOS	Male Concert Performer of the Year	Nominated	
2014	I Heart You	Album Cover Concept & Design of the Year	Nominated	
2015	"Simpleng Tulad Mo"	Song of The Year	Nominated	
2015	Most Wanted	Concert of The Year	Nominated	
2015	Most Wanted	Male Concert Performer of the Year	Nominated	
2016	I Feel Good	Pop Album of the Year	Nominated	
2016	I Feel Good	Male Pop Artist of the Year	Nominated	
2016	I Feel Good	Cover Design of the Year	Nominated	
2021	Daniel Padilla	Male Recording Artist of the Year	Won	
2021	"Mabagal"	Song of the Year	Won	
2021	"Mabagal"(with Moira Dela Torre)	Collaboration of the Year	Won	

=== MOR Pinoy Music Awards ===
ABS-CBN’s FM radio station MOR 101.9 annually celebrate Original Pilipino Music and recognized some of the best music artists in the industry. Winners are determined based on total votes from texters, MOR Pinoy Music Awards committee, and select panel of judges from the Organisasyon ng Pilipinong Mang-aawit (OPM).

Year	Notable Works	Category	Result	Ref.
2014	DJP	Album of the Year	Won	
2014	Himself	Male Artist of the Year	Won	
2015	Himself	Male Artist of The Year	Won	
2016	Himself	Phenomenal Artist of The year	Won	

== Film and television ==
=== Film Development Council of the Philippines ===
Year	Notable Works	Category	Result	Ref.
2019	The Hows of Us	Camera Obscura Awardee Highest Grossing Filipino Film in a Regular Screening	Won	
2019	The Hows of Us (KathNiel)	Loveteam ng Sentenaryo Sine Sandaan Luminaries Recognition	Won	

=== FAMAS Awards ===
FAMAS Awards is the annual honors given by the Filipino Academy of Movie Arts and Sciences (FAMAS), an organization composed of prize-winning writers and movie columnists, for achievements in the Philippine cinema for a calendar year.

Year	Notable Works	Category	Result	Ref.
2012	Himself	German Moreno Youth Achievement Awardee	Won	
2014	Pagpag: Siyam na Buhay	Best Actor	Nominated	
2015	She's Dating the Gangster	Best Actor	Nominated	
2016	Crazy Beautiful You	Best Actor	Nominated	
2017	Barcelona: A Love Untold	Best Actor	Won	
2019	The Hows of Us	Best Actor	Nominated	
2022	Kun Maupay Man It Panahon	Best Actor	Nominated	

=== GMMSF Box-Office Entertainment Awards ===
Year	Notable Works	Category	Result	Ref.
2013	Himself	Most Promising Male Star of the Year	Won	
2013	KathNiel (with Kathryn Bernardo)	Most Promising Love Team	Won	
2014	Pagpag: Siyam na Buhay	Prince of Philippine Movies	Won	
2014	Himself	Promising Male Singer/Performer	Won	
2015	She's Dating the Gangster; Got to Believe	Teen King of Philippine Movies & TV	Won	
2016	Crazy Beautiful You	Prince of Philippine Movies	Won	
2017	Barcelona: A Love Untold	Box Office King	Won	
2018	Can't Help Falling In Love; La Luna Sangre	Prince of Philippine Movies and TV	Won	
2018	Himself (The Revenger Squad)	Phenomenal Star of Philippine Cinema	Won	
2019	Himself (The Hows of Us)	Phenomenal Star of Philippine Cinema	Won	
2019	The Hows of Us	Golden Jury Award for Highest Grossing Film of All Time (with Kathryn Bernardo)	Won	

=== Luna Awards ===
The Luna Awards are awards given annually by the Film Academy of the Philippines (FAP) to recognize the outstanding achievements of the Filipino film industry. It is considered to be the Philippine counterpart of the Oscars.

Year	Notable Works	Category	Result	Ref.
2019	The Hows of Us	Best Actor	Won	

=== Metro Manila Film Festival ===
It is one of the two Filipino major film festivals to exclude foreign films in a week-long period, the other being the Pista ng Pelikulang Pilipino.

Year	Notable Works	Category	Result	Ref.
2013	Pagpag: Siyam na Buhay	Best Actor	Nominated	
2013	Pagpag: Siyam na Buhay	Mavshack Male Star of the Night	Won	
2021	Kun Maupay Man It Panahon	Special Jury Award	Won	

=== PMPC Star Award for Movie ===
Year	Notable Works	Category	Result	Ref.
2013	24/7 in Love	New Movie Actor of the Year	Nominated	
2016	Crazy Beautiful You	Movie Actor of the Year	Nominated	
2016	Crazy Beautiful You	Movie Love Team of the Year (with Kathryn Bernardo)	Won	
2017	Barcelona: A Love Untold	Movie Actor of the Year	Won	
2017	Barcelona: A Love Untold	Movie Love Team of the Year (with Kathryn Bernardo)	Won	
2019	The Hows of Us	Movie Actor of the Year	Nominated	
2019	The Hows of Us	Movie Love Team of the Year (with Kathryn Bernardo)	Won	

=== PMPC Star Awards for Television ===
Year	Notable Works	Category	Result	Ref.
2014	Himself	German Moreno Power Tandem of the Year	Won	
2015	Pangako Sa 'Yo	Best Drama Actor	Nominated	
2017	La Luna Sangre	Best Drama Actor	Nominated	

=== Young Critics Circle ===
Year	Notable Works	Category	Result	Ref.
2013	Pagpag: Siyam na Buhay	Best Performance by Male or Female, Adult or Child, Individual or Ensemble in Leading or Supporting Role	Nominated	

== Popularity and Commerciality ==
=== ASAP Pop Viewers' Choice Awards ===
Year	Notable Works	Category	Result	Ref.
2011	Himself	Tween Popsies (with Kathryn Bernardo)	Nominated	
2011	Himself	Pop Cutie	Nominated	
2012	Himself	Pop Male Artist	Won	
2012	Himself	Pop Male Cutie	Won	
2012	Himself	Pop Male Fashionista	Won	
2012	KathNiels	Pop Fans Club	Won	
2012	Himself	Tween Popsies (with Kathryn Bernardo)	Nominated	
2012	Daniel Padilla (EP)	Pop Album	Nominated	
2013	Himself	Pop Male Artist	Won	
2013	Nasa Iyo Na Ang Lahat	Pop Song	Won	
2013	Himself	Pop Cover Boy	Won	
2013	Got to Believe "Chichay and Joaquin"	Pop Kapamilya TV Character (with Kathryn Bernardo)	Won	
2013	DJP	Pop Album	Nominated	
2013	Nasa Iyo Na Ang Lahat	Pop Music Video	Nominated	
2013	Must Be... Love	Pop Movie Love Team (with Kathryn Bernardo)	Nominated	
2013	KathNiels	Pop Fans Club	Nominated	
2014	Himself	Pop Male Artist	Nominated	
2014	I Heart You	Pop Song	Nominated	
2014	I Heart You	Pop Album	Won	
2014	Simpleng Tulad Mo	Pop Music Video	Nominated	
2014	Himself	Pop Screen Kiss (with Kathryn Bernardo)	Nominated	
2014	Himself	Pop Love Team (with Kathryn Bernardo)	Won	
2014	Himself	Pop Male Fashionista	Nominated	
2014	Himself	Pop Fans Club "KathNiel"	Nominated	

=== ASAP's Pop Teen Choice Awards ===
Year	Notable Works	Category	Result	Ref.
2015	Himself	Pop Teen Heartthrob	Won	
2015	KathNiel (with Kathryn Bernardo)	Pop Love Team	Nominated	
2016	KathNiel	Pop Love Team	Nominated	
2017	Himself	Pop Teen Heartthrob	Nominated	
2017	KathNiel (with Kathryn Bernardo)	Pop Love Team	Nominated	

=== Anak TV Awards ===
Anak TV Awards is recognition for personalities and programs that are certified child-friendly as voted by parents, teachers, non-government organizations, and other sectors of society.

Year	Notable Works	Category	Result	Ref.
2013	Himself	Youth Role Model of the Year (Male)	Won	
2014	Himself	Youth Role Model of the Year (Male)	Won	
2017	Himself	Youth Role Model of the Year (Male)	Won	

=== EdukCircle Awards ===
The EdukCircle recognizes exemplary performances of personalities in news and entertainment whose professional works have made significant contributions to Philippine music, film and television.

Year	Notable Works	Category	Result	Ref.
2014	Himself	Most Influential Teen Actor	Won	
2015	Himself	Most Influential Teen Actor in Film and Television	Won	
2015	DOS	Most Influential Concert Performer of the Year	Won	
2016	Himself	Most Influential Celebrity Endorsers of the Year	Won	
2016	Pangako Sa 'Yo	Most Outstanding Young Actor in Television	Won	
2016	Most Wanted	Most Influential Concert of the Year	Won	
2017	Can't Help Falling In Love With You	Male Music Artist of the Year	Nominated	
2017	La Luna Sangre	Best Actor - Television Series	Nominated	
2017	Barcelona: A Love Untold	Most Influential Film Actors of the Year	Won	
2017	Himself	Most Influential Male Endorsers of The Year	Won	
2017	KathNiel (with Kathryn Bernardo)	Most Influential Love Team of The Year	Won	
2018	Gandarrapido: The Revenger Squad	Most Influential Film Actors of the Year	Won	
2018	Himself	Most Influential Male Endorsers of the Year	Won	
2019	The Hows of Us	Most Influential Film Actors of the Year	Won	
2019	Himself	Most Influential Male Endorsers of the Year	Won	
2020	Himself	Most Influential Celebrity of the Decade	Won	

=== FMTM Awards for TV Entertainment Section ===
Year	Notable Works	Category	Result	Ref.
2011	Himself	On Screen Couple of the Year (with Kathryn Bernardo)	Nominated	
2011	Himself	Most Promising TV Actor	Nominated	
2011	Himself	Most Promising On Screen Couple (with Kathryn Bernardo)	Nominated	
2012	Himself	Best Breakthrough Performance by an Actor	Nominated	
2012	Himself	TV Actor of the Year	Nominated	
2012	Princess and I	TV Series Love Team of the Year (with Kathryn Bernardo)	Nominated	
2012	Princess and I	Most Promising Male Star	Nominated	
2012	Himself	Hottest Trending Male Star	Won	
2012	Himself	Hottest Trending Celebrity Couple (with Kathryn Bernardo)	Won	
2012	Himself	Top 5 Most Popular TV Actors	Top 3	
2012	Himself	Top 5 Most Popular Love Teams (with Kathryn Bernardo)	Top 3	
2012	Himself	Primetime Prince	Won	

=== Push Awards ===
Year	Notable Works	Category	Result	Ref.
2015	Himself	PushLike Most Liked Male Celebrity	Won	
2015	KathNiel (with Kathryn Bernardo)	PushLike Most Liked Group or Tandem	Won	
2015	KathNiel (with Kathryn Bernardo)	PushTweet Favourite Group or Tandem	Won	
2015	KathNiel (with Kathryn Bernardo)	PushGram Most Loved Group or Tandem	Won	
2015	Himself	PushPlay Best Male Celebrity	Won	
2015	Himself	Push Elite Male Celebrity	Won	
2015	KathNiel	PushPlay Best Group or Tandem	Won	
2015	KathNiel	Push Elite Group or Tandem of the Year	Won	
2016	Himself	Push Tweet Male Celebrity award	Won	
2016	KathNiel	Push Elite Group/Tandem	Won	
2016	KathNiel	Push Like Group/Tandem (Facebook)	Won	
2016	KathNiel	Push Tweet Group/Tandem	Won	
2016	KathNiel	Push Gram Group/Tandem	Won	
2016	KathNiel	Push Play Group/Tandem	Won	
2017	Himself	Push Male Celebrity	Won	
2017	Himself	Push Male Movie Performance of the Year	Won	
2017	Himself	Push Male ViVo Personality of the Year	Won	
2017	KathNiel	Push Group/Tandem of the year	Nominated	
2020	Himself	Push Music Personality of the Year	Won	

=== Urduja Heritage Film Awards ===
Urduja Film Festival is an annual undertaking to promote independent Films in Northern Luzon: Region 1, 2, 3 and CAR. It envisioned to hone the artistic and creative minds of the populace in the make-believe artistry of the celluloid world. The winners selected by jury which is headed by a Famas member, and composed of film critics both from the indie and mainstream.

Year	Notable Works	Category	Result	Ref.
2017	Himself	Best Actor	Nominated	

== Accolades From Media ==
=== ALTA Media Icon Awards ===
The University of Perpetual Help System DALTA, in celebration of its Founding Anniversary, recognized outstanding individuals, programs, and other entities in the field of mass media. The winners were chosen by college students of University of Perpetual Help - Las Piñas while a separate screening committee composed of esteemed administrators and educators judged the nominees for the Media Icon awards.

Year	Notable Works	Category	Result	Ref.
2015	Pangako Sa' Yo	Most Influential Male TV Personality	Won	
2017	Barcelona: A Love Untold	Best Actor for Film	Won	
2018	La Luna Sangre	Most Influential Male TV Personality	Won	
2019	The Hows Of Us	Best Actor for Film	Won	

=== Candy Readers Choice Awards ===
Year	Notable Works	Category	Result	Ref.
2014	Himself	Best Actor	Nominated	
2014	KathNiel (with Kathryn Bernardo)	Best Love Team	Won	
2014	Himself	Biggest Heartthrob	Won	
2015	Himself	Favorite Actor	Nominated	
2015	KathNiel	Favorite Love Team	Won	

=== Candy Style Awards ===
Year	Notable Works	Category	Result	Ref.
2013	KathNiel (with Kathryn Bernardo)	Most Stylish Love Team	Won	

=== EDDYS Entertainment Editors' Awards ===
Organized by the Society of Philippine Entertainment Editors, the Eddys aims to encourage local filmmakers, producers, writers, and actors to continue pursuing their passion of creating films that mirror the realities of our society.

Year	Notable Works	Category	Result	Ref.
2017	Barcelona: A Love Untold	Best Actor	Nominated	
2019	The Hows Of Us	Best Actor	Nominated	

=== Kakulay Teen Choice Awards ===
Year	Notable Works	Category	Result	Ref.
2013	Himself	Best Teen Drama Actor	Won	
2013	Himself	Primetime Prince	Won	
2014	Himself	Best Teen Drama Actor	Won	
2014	Himself	Most Popular Male Celebrity in Social Media	Won	

=== PEP List Awards ===
The PEP List Year is the only audited award-giving body given by Philippine Entertainment Portal in the Philippines where outstanding celebrities and showbiz personalities are recognized for their contribution to the industry for the past year. The PEPsters’ Choice winners are the celebrities with the most number of public votes.

Year	Notable Works	Category	Result	Ref.
2014	DJP	OPM Artist of the Year	Won	
2014	Himself	Male Teen Star of the Year	Won	
2014	Himself	Newsmaker of the Year	Nominated	
2014	Himself	Male Fab of the Year	Nominated	
2014	KathNiel (with Kathryn Bernardo)	Celebrity Pair of the Year	Nominated	
2015	She’s Dating the Gangster	Movie Star of the Year	Won	
2015	Rommel Padilla and sons; Daniel & RJ	Best Peptalk Episode	Nominated	
2015	Himself	Newsmaker of the Year	Nominated	
2015	Himself	Male Fab of the Year	Nominated	
2015	Himself	Male Teen Star of the Year	Nominated	
2015	KathNiel	Celebrity Pair of the Year	Nominated	
2016	Crazy Beautiful You	Male Movie Star of the Year	Won	
2016	Crazy Beautiful You	Celebrity Pair of the Year (with Kathryn Bernardo)	Nominated	
2017	Barcelona: A Love Untold	Male Movie Star of the Year	Pending	
2017	KathNiel	Celebrity Pair of the Year (with Kathryn Bernardo)	Pending	

=== Rappler Social Media Awards ===
Year	Notable Works	Category	Result	Ref.
2012	Himself	Pinoy Musician of the Year	Nominated	
2014	Himself	Pinoy Celebrity of the Year (with Kathryn Bernardo)	Nominated	
2014	Nasa Iyo Na Ang Lahat	LSS of the Year	Nominated	

=== RAWR Awards ===
Year	Notable Works	Category	Result	Ref.
2015	Kathniel (with Kathryn Bernardo)	Trending Love Team of the Year	Won	
2015	Himself	Male Celebrity of the Year	Won	
2015	Himself	Male Performer of the Year	Nominated	
2016	Kathniel	Popular Love Team of the Year	Nominated	
2016	KathNiel	Fan Club of the Year	Nominated	
2016	Himself	Favorite Actor of the Year	Nominated	

=== Star Cinema Online Awards ===
Year	Notable Works	Category	Result	Ref.
2014	Himself	Newsmaker of the Year	Nominated	
2014	Himself	Fan Favorite Wrecking Bowl	Nominated	
2014	KathNiel (with Kathryn Bernardo)	Favorite Love Team	Nominated	
2014	Himself	Favorite Male Movie Star	Nominated	
2015	Pangako Sa 'Yo	Favorite TV Love Team ( (with Kathryn Bernardo)	Nominated	
2016	Himself	Favorite Male Star or #HowToBeYoursPo	Nominated	
2016	Himself	Favorite Recording Artist or #VoiceOnFleek Award	Nominated	
2016	KathNiel	Favorite Love Team or #CoupleGoals	Nominated	
2016	KathNiel	Best Fandom or #SquadGoals Award	Nominated	
2016	KathNiel	Favorite Trending Sensation or #ViralRoyalty	Nominated	
2016	KathNiel	Favorite Movie of the Year or #MovingMovie (Barcelona: A Love Untold)	Nominated	
2016	KathNiel	Favorite Teleserye or #TVSlayer award (Pangako Sa 'Yo)	Nominated	
2016	KathNiel	Favorite Movie Line or #PakGanern Award "Wag mo 'kong mahalin dahil mahal kita. Mahalin mo 'ko dahil mahal mo 'ko, because that is what I deserve."	Won	

=== StarStudio Celebrity Style Awards ===
Year	Notable Works	Category	Result	Ref.
2013	Himself	Young Stylish Guy on the Rise	Nominated	
2013	KathNiel (with Kathryn Bernardo)	Most Stylish Love Team	Nominated	

=== Yahoo! Philippines OMG! Awards ===
Year	Notable Works	Category	Result	Ref.
2012	Himself	Best New Male Comer	Won	
2013	Himself	Breakthrough Actor of the Year	Nominated	
2013	Himself	Love Team of the Year (with Kathryn Bernardo)	Nominated	
2013	KathNiels	Fan Club of the Year (with Kathryn Bernardo)	Nominated	
2014	Himself	Male Performer of the Year	Nominated	
2014	Himself	Love Team of the Year (with Kathryn Bernardo)	Nominated	
2014	KathNiels	Fan Club of the Year (with Kathryn Bernardo)	Nominated	
2014	Padilla Family	Celebrity Family of the Year	Won	

=== Yes! Magazine ===
Year	Notable Works	Category	Result	Ref.
2012	Himself	100 Most Beautiful Stars	Included	
2012	Daniel Padilla on X	Top 20 Most Influential Celebrity Netizen	Top 11	
2013	Himself	100 Most Beautiful Stars	Included	
2014	Himself	100 Most Beautiful Stars	Included	
2015	Himself	100 Most Beautiful Stars	Included	
2016	Himself	100 Most Beautiful Stars	Included	
2017	KathNiel (with Kathryn Bernardo)	100 Most Beautiful Stars	Won	

== Miscellaneous ==
=== Star Magic Awards ===
Year	Notable Works	Category	Result	Ref.
2012	Himself	Breakout Style Award	Won	
2013	Himself	Couple of the Night (with Kathryn Bernardo)	Won	
2015	Himself	Best Dressed Couple (with Kathryn Bernardo)	Won	

=== Star Magic Sportfest ===
Year	Notable Works	Category	Result	Ref.
2013	Himself	MVP Junior Basketball	Won	
2013	Himself	ROOS’ MVP Award	Won	
2013	Himself	Most Valuable Player	Won	

=== LionhearTV ===
Year	Notable Works	Category	Result	Ref.
2016	Himself	Most Loved Male Artist	Won	
2017	KathNiel	Effortless Kilig Love Team	Won	
2017	Himself	Male Summer Bod of 2017	Won	

=== NBS Fan Favorites ===
Year	Notable Works	Category	Result	Ref.
2016	KathNiel (Mega Mag)	Fan Favorite Magazine - November Issue	Won	

=== Inside Showbiz People's Choice Awards ===
Year	Notable Works	Category	Result	Ref.
2016	KathNiel	Love Team of the Year	Nominated	
2016	KathNiel	Fandom of the Year	Nominated	
2016	KathNiel	Favorite Teleserye (Pangako Sa ’Yo)	Won	
2016	KathNiel	Favorite Movie of the Year (Barcelona: A Love Untold)	Nominated	
2016	KathNiel	Favorite Inside Showbiz Cover	Won	
2016	KathNiel	Favorite MEGA Cover	Nominated	

=== The Village Pipol Choice Awards ===
The Village Pipol Choice Awards (VPCA) is an annual award-giving body in the Philippines, organized by Village Pipol Magazine and Red Entertainment, Inc. It recognizes outstanding individuals, programs, and companies across various industries based on the choices of the public (referred to as "Pipol") and evaluations by industry experts and the Village Pipol editorial team. The awards include "Headliner of the Year" and "Pipol of the Year" categories, recognizing individuals who have made a significant impact and inspired the public.

Year	Notable Works	Category	Result	Ref.
2020	Himself	TV Male Icon of the Decade	Won	
2021	Kun Maupay Man It Panahon (Whether the Weather Is Fine)	Movie Actor of the Year	Won	
2022	2 Good 2 Be True	Male TV Actor of the Year	Nominated	
2022	Kathniel with Kathryn Bernardo	Loveteam of the Year	Nominated)	
2025	Incognito	Headliner of The Year for TV award	Won)	
