= 19th Box Office Entertainment Awards =

Philippine film award ceremony in 1989

1989 Box Office Entertainment Awards
- Date: April 14, 1989
- Location: Celebrity Sports Plaza, Quezon City
- Most wins: Aiza Seguerra

The 19th Box Office Entertainment Awards, honoring the Filipino actors, actresses and other performers' commercial success, regardless of artistic merit, in the Philippine entertainment industry, was held at the Celebrity Sports Plaza Grand Ballroom, Quezon City on April 14, 1989. Hosted by Jean Garcia and Tirzo Cruz III, the winners were chosen by the board of jurors of the Guillermo Mendoza Memorial Scholarship Foundation, Inc.

== Winners ==
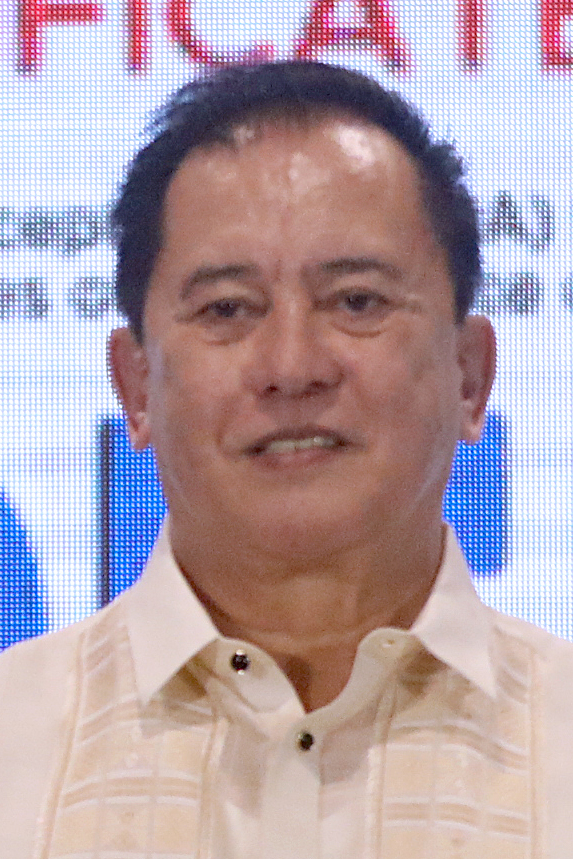
Phillip Salvador, 1989 Box Office King of Philippine Movies

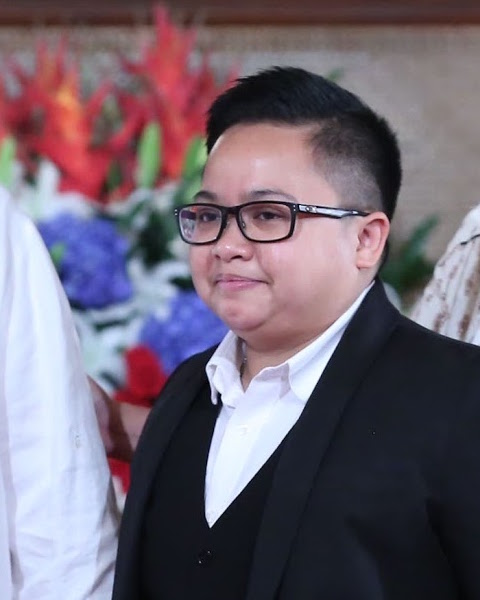
Aiza Seguerra, 1989 Box Office Queen and Child Actress of Philippine Movies

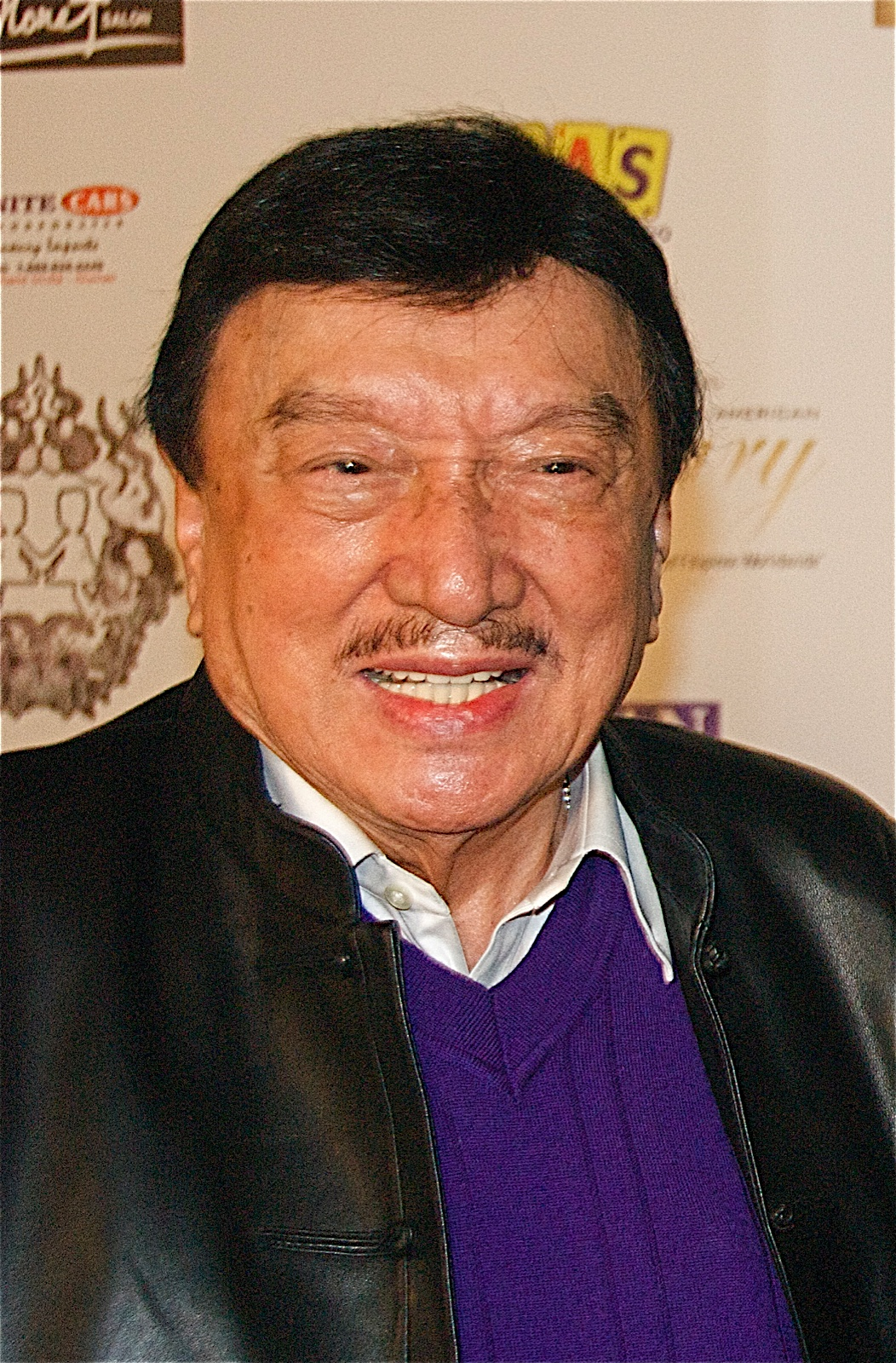
Dolphy wins All-time Favorite Actor

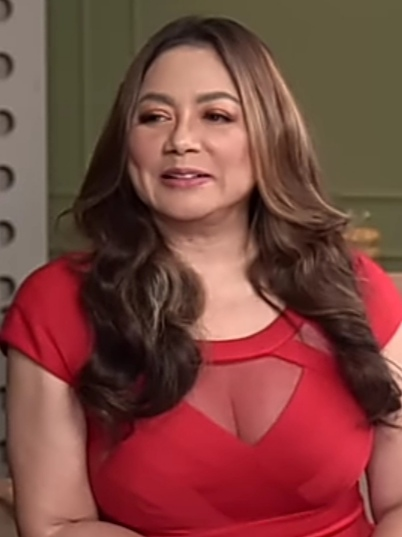
Dina Bonnevie, 1989 Ms. Republic of the Philippine Movies

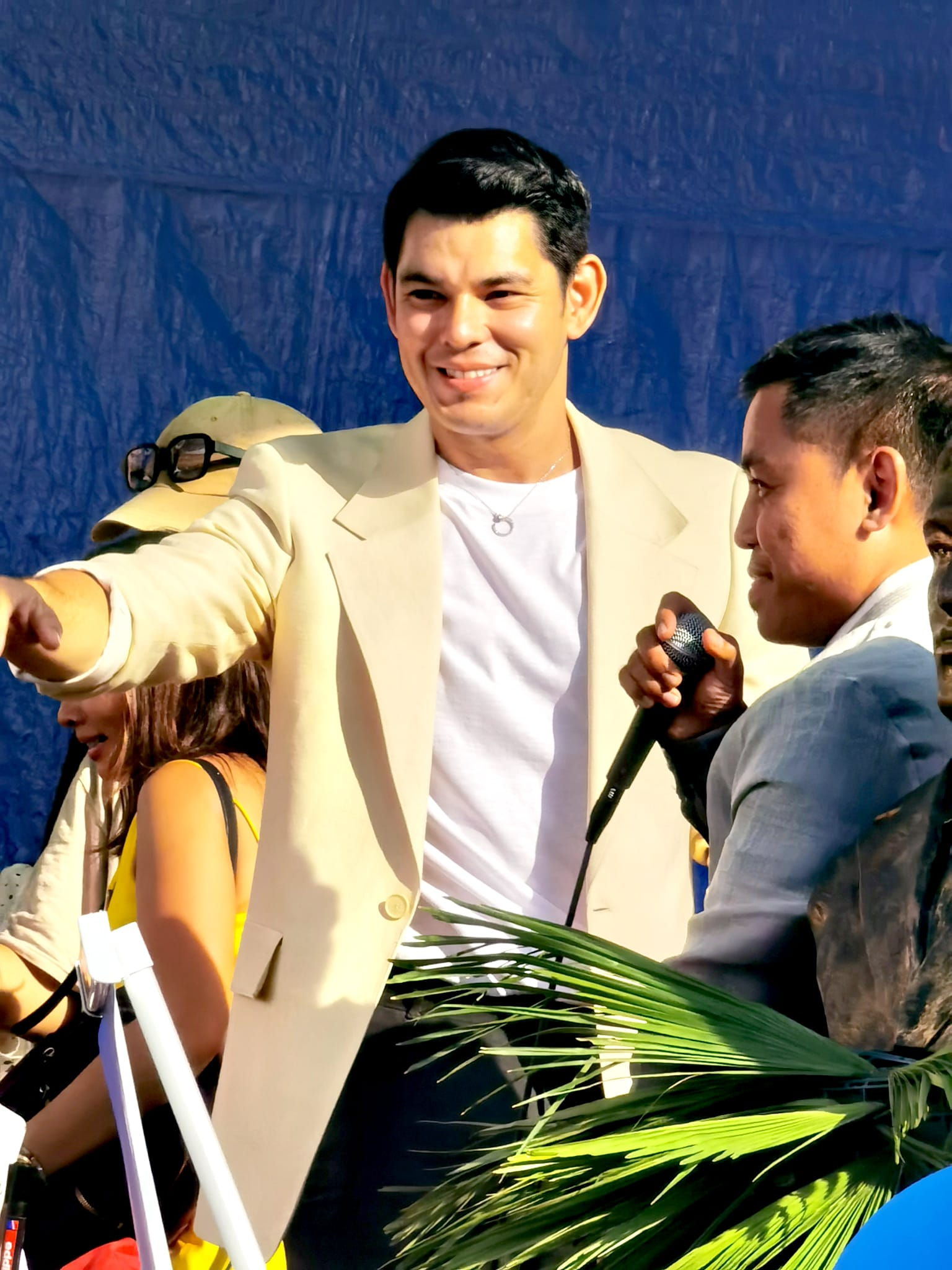
Richard Gutierrez, 1989 Philippine Movie Child Actor

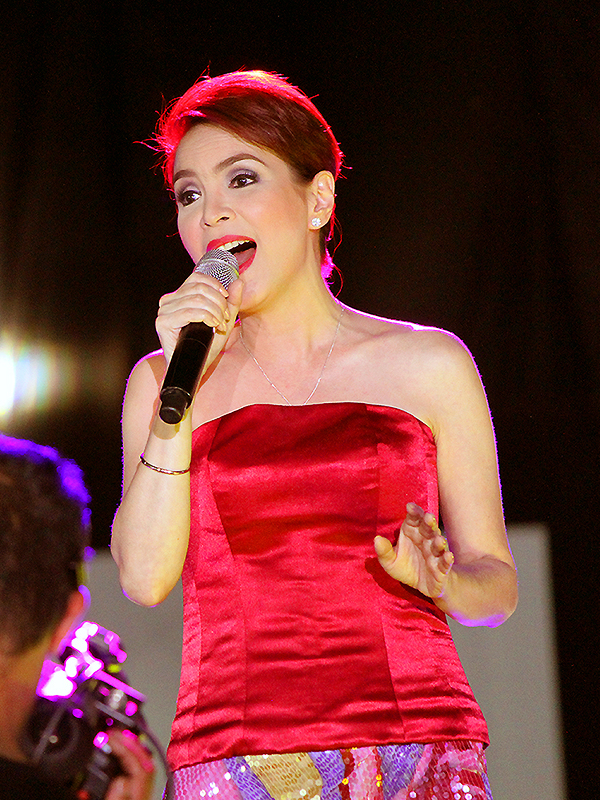
Jaime Rivera, 1989 Most Promising Female Singer

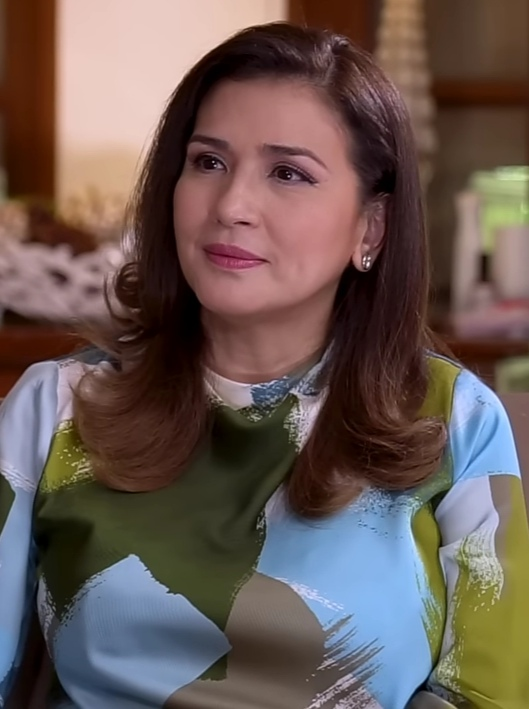
Zsa Zsa Padilla, 1989 Ms. Popular Singer of the Philippines

- Box-Office King - Philip Salvador
- Box-Office Queen - Aiza Seguerra
- Mr. Republic of the Philippine Movies - Bong Revilla
- Ms. Republic of the Philippine Movies - Dina Bonnevie
- Popular Teenage King of Philippine Movies - Romnick Sarmenta
- Popular Teenage Queen of Philippine Movies - Sheryl Cruz
- All-time Favorite Actor - Dolphy
- All-time Favorite Actress - Susan Roces
- Philippine Movie Child Actors - Richard Gutierrez and Raymond Gutierrez
- Philippine Movie Child Actress - Aiza Seguerra
- Popular Loveteam of RP Movies - Ramon Christopher and Lotlot de Leon
- Promising Stars of RP Movies - Keempee de Leon and Manilyn Reynes
- Philippine Group Singer and Dancer Entertainers - TUX and Vicor Dancers
- Promising Male Singer-Performer - Dingdong Avanzado
- Promising Female Singer-Performer - Jamie Rivera
- Mr. Popular Singer-Entertainer of the Philippines - Randy Santiago
- Ms. Popular Singer-Entertainer of the Philippines - Zsa Zsa Padilla
- Popular TV Entertainer and Program - German Moreno and the GMA Supershow
- Best Movie Writer - Elena Patron de los Angeles
- Stuntman of the Year - Dante Abadesa
- Outstanding Movie Director - Mike Relon Makiling
- Outstanding Producer of the Year - Donna Villa of Golden Lion Films
- Recognition Award for Government Service - Manoling Morato
- Recognition Award for Public Service - Rosa Rosal
- Jose Cris Soto's Memorial Award - Metring David

== Multiple awards ==
=== Individuals with multiple awards ===
The following individual names received two or more awards:

Awards	Name
2	Aiza Seguerra
