= Box Office Entertainment Award for Box Office Queen =

Philippines film award

- Awarded for: Attaining the Highest Box Office Record Film of the Year
- Country: Philippines
- Presented by: Guillermo Mendoza Memorial Scholarship Foundation
- First award: 1971
- Currently held by: Kathryn Bernardo, A Very Good Girl (2023)

The Philippine Box Office Entertainment Award for Box Office Queen is an award presented annually by the Memorial Scholarship Foundation, led by Corazon Samaniego. It was first awarded at the 1st Box Office Entertainment Awards ceremony in 1971. Amalia Fuentes was the first recipient of the Box Office Queen award.

Vilma Santos and Sharon Cuneta are the only two actresses to be elevated to the Philippine Box Office Queen Hall of Fame in 1986 and 1990 respectively, for winning the box-office queen title five times.

== Winners ==
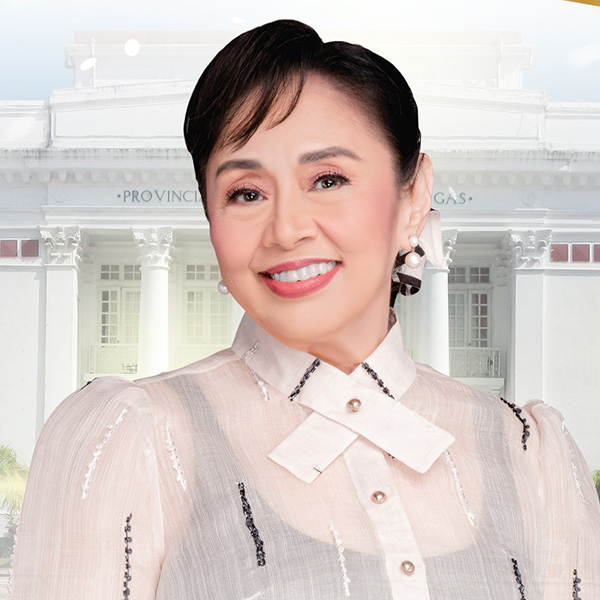
Vilma Santos is Philippine cinema's longest reigning box office queen. She is the first actress to be elevated to the Box Office Queen Hall of Fame in 1986

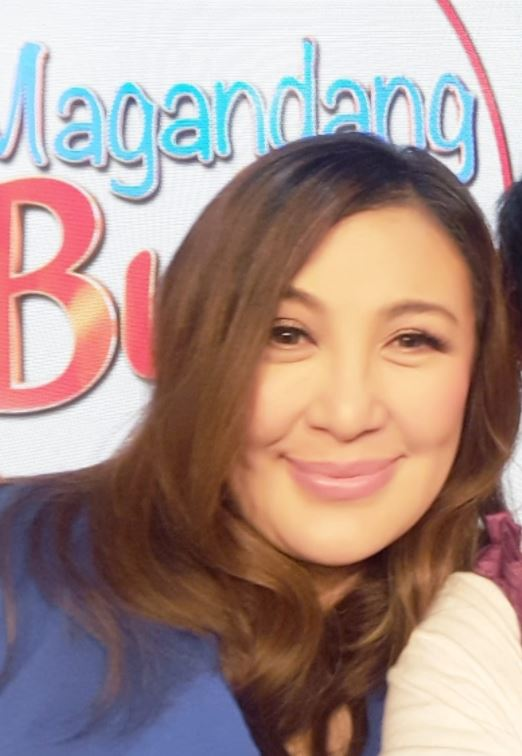
Sharon Cuneta was crowned Box Office Queen for four consecutive years (1984 to 1987). She was elevated to the Box Office Queen Hall of Fame in 1990

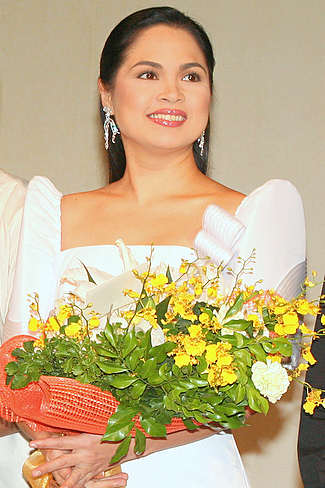
Judy Ann Santos won in 1999 for her performance in Isusumbong Kita Sa Tatay Ko.

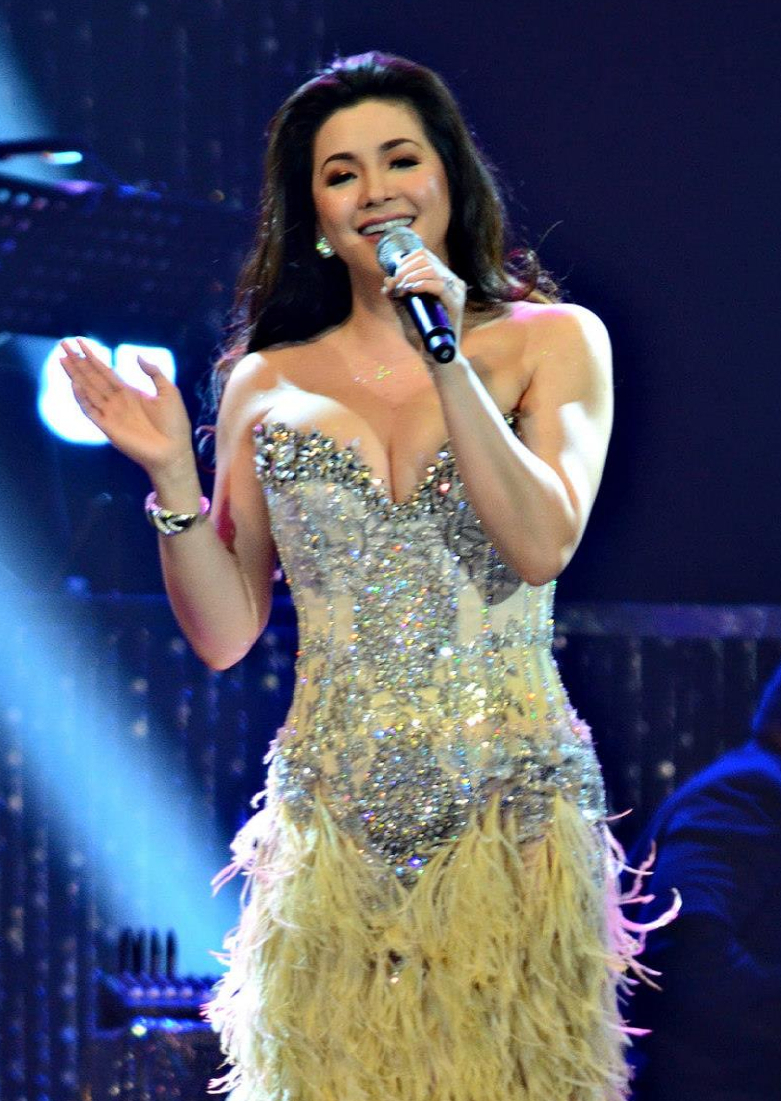
Regine Velasquez won in 2001 for her performance in Pangako Ikaw Lang.

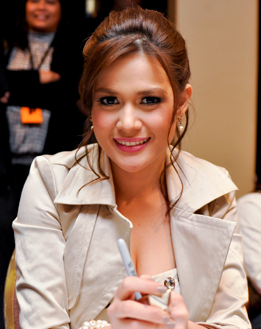
Bea Alonzo has won several times including her first win in 2007 for her film One More Chance.

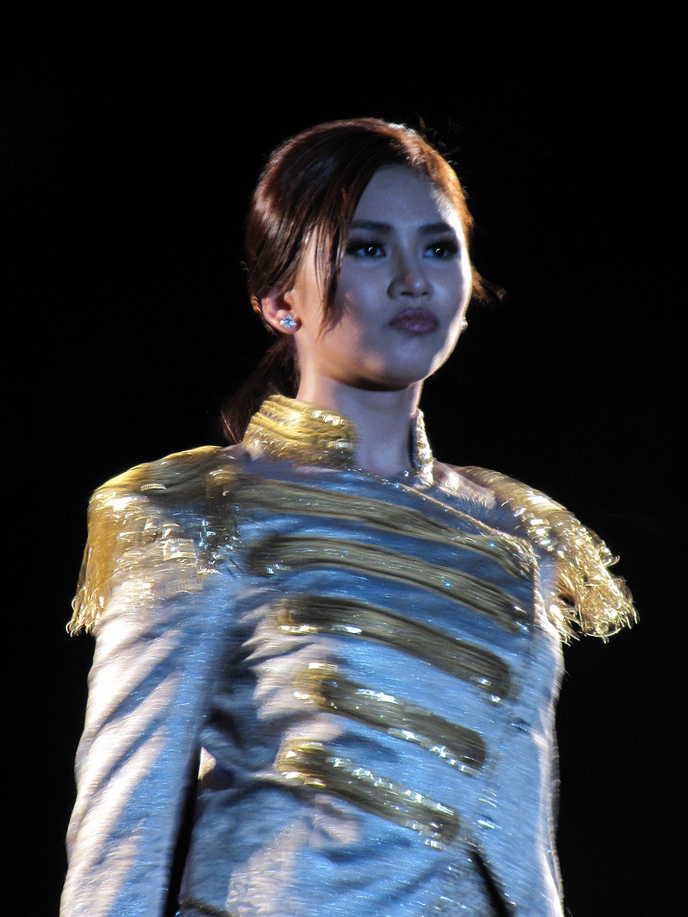
Sarah Geronimo has won multiple times including her first win in 2008 for her performance in A Very Special Love.

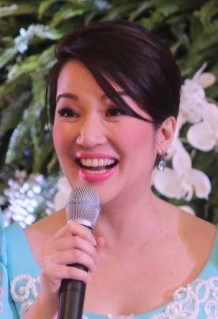
Kris Aquino has won multiple times and known as the "Box Office Horror Queen" for her horror movies Feng Shui and Sukob.

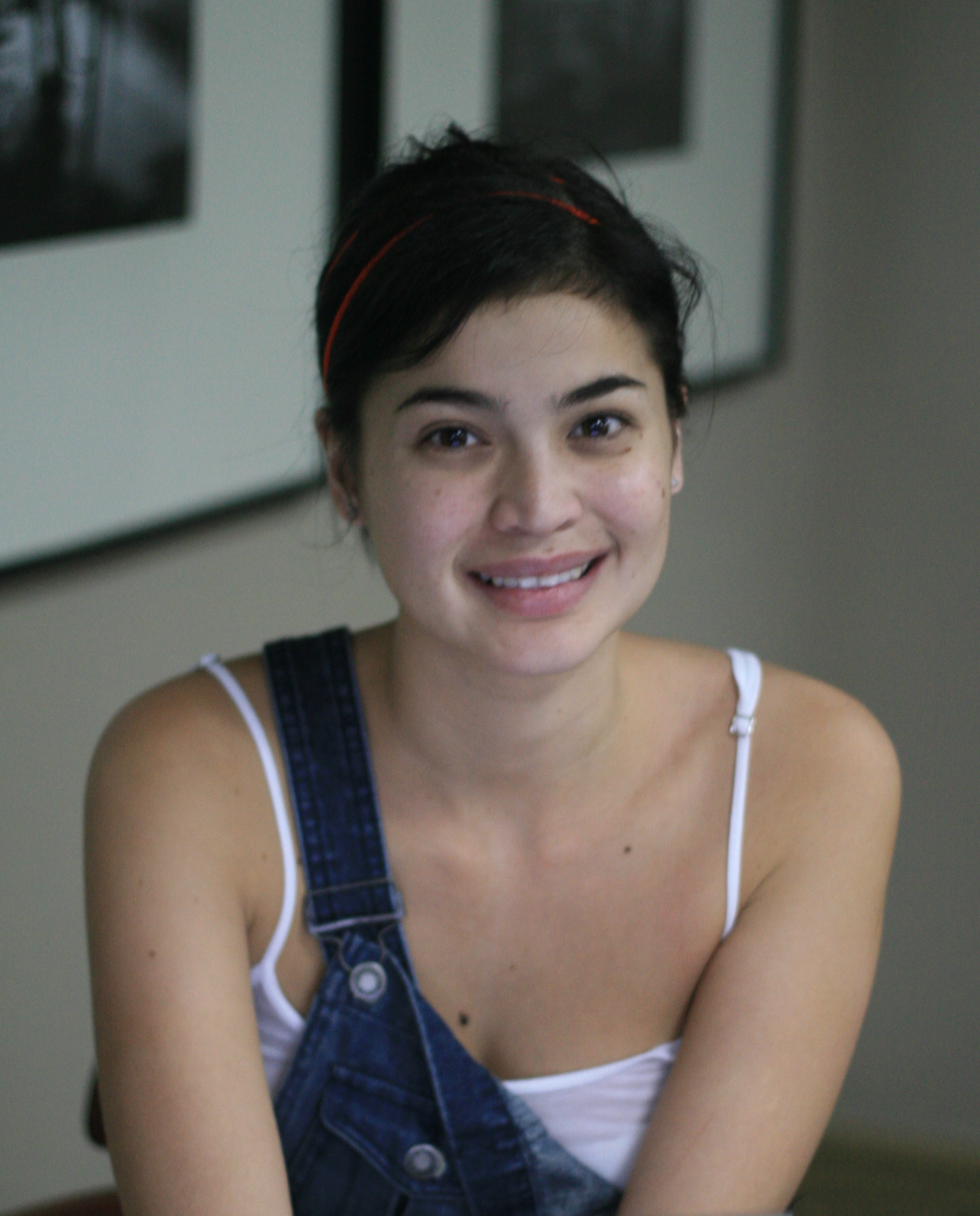
Anne Curtis is the co-winner of 2011's "Box Office Queen" for her role in No Other Woman.

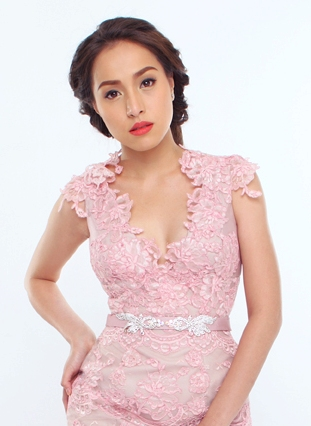
Cristine Reyes is the co-winner of 2011's "Box Office Queen" for her performance in No Other Woman.

Year	Actor
1970 (1st)	Amalia Fuentes
1971 (2nd)	Nora Aunor
1972 (3rd)	Vilma Santos
1973 (4th)	Vilma Santos
1974 (5th)	Vilma Santos
1975 (6th)	Gloria Diaz
1976 (7th)	Alma Moreno
1977 (8th)	Vilma Santos
1978 (9th)	Vilma Santos
1979 (10th)	Vilma Santos
1980 (11th)	Vilma Santos
1981 (12th)	Nora Aunor
1982 (13th)	Vilma Santos
1983 (14th)	Vilma Santos
1984 (15th)	Sharon Cuneta
1985 (16th)	Sharon Cuneta
1986 (17th)	Sharon Cuneta
1987 (18th)	Sharon Cuneta
1988 (19th)	Aiza Seguerra
1989 (20th)	Sharon Cuneta
1990 (21st)	Kris Aquino
1991 (22nd)	Sharon Cuneta
1992 (23rd)	Sharon Cuneta
1993 (24th)	Sharon Cuneta
1994 (25th)	Dawn Zulueta
1995 (26th)	Nora Aunor
1996 (27th)	Sharon Cuneta
1997 (28th)	Rosanna Roces
1998 (29th)	Rosanna Roces
1999 (30th)	Judy Ann Santos
2000 (31st)	Vilma Santos
2001 (32nd)	Regine Velasquez
2002 (33rd)	Claudine Barretto
2003 (33rd)	Ai-Ai delas Alas
2004 (35th)	Kris Aquino
2005 (36th)	Kristine Hermosa
2006 (37th)	Kris Aquino and Claudine Barretto
2007 (38th)	Bea Alonzo
2009 (40th)	Sarah Geronimo
2010 (41st)	Sarah Geronimo
2011 (42nd)	Ai-Ai delas Alas
2012 (43rd)	Anne Curtis and Cristine Reyes
2013 (44th)	Bea Alonzo
2014 (45th)	Sarah Geronimo
2015 (46th)	Toni Gonzaga
2016 (47th)	Ai-Ai Delas Alas
2017 (48th)	Kathryn Bernardo
2018 (49th)	Liza Soberano
2019 (50th)	Maine Mendoza
2020 (51st)	Xia Vigor
2024 (52nd)	Kathryn Bernardo

== Multiple wins ==
Actress	Record Set
Vilma Santos	10
Sharon Cuneta	9
Ai-Ai delas Alas	3
Kris Aquino	3
Nora Aunor	3
Sarah Geronimo	3
Bea Alonzo	2
Claudine Barretto	2
Kathryn Bernardo	2
Rosanna Roces	2
