= 2024 Box Office Entertainment Awards =

Annual Philippine entertainment awards

- Date: May 12, 2024 (television broadcast May 25, 2024)
- Location: Henry Lee Irwin Theater, Ateneo de Manila University
- Hosted by: Enchong Dee; Kaila Estrada; Edward Barber

Television/radio coverage
- Network: A2Z
- Produced by: Airtime Marketing Phils., Inc.

The 52nd Guillermo Mendoza Memorial Scholarship Foundation Box Office Entertainment Awards (GMMSF-BOEA) was an awarding ceremony honoring the actors, actresses, showbiz personalities, movies and TV programs in the Philippines. After being halted for a few years due to the pandemic, the foundation decided to bring back the prestigious awarding ceremony that took place at the Henry Lee Irwin Theater in Ateneo de Manila University, on May 12, 2024. It's set for television broadcast on May 25, 2024, through A2Z.

== Winners selection ==
The GMMSF honors Filipino actors, actresses and other performers' commercial success in the Philippine entertainment industry. The award giving body selects the high-ranking Philippine films for the calendar year 2023 based on total average rankings at box office published results as basis for awarding The Phenomenal Box Office Star.

=== Winners ===
==== Film ====
Award	Name of Winner	Movie / Show
Phenomenal Box Office Star	Marian Rivera, Dingdong Dantes	Rewind
Box Office King	Alden Richards	Five Breakups and a Romance
Box Office Queen	Kathryn Bernardo	A Very Good Girl
Film Actor of the Year	Dingdong Dantes, Piolo Pascual	Rewind, Mallari
Film Actress of the Year	Vilma Santos	When I Met You in Tokyo
Movie Supporting Actor of the Year	Enchong Dee	GomBurZa
Movie Supporting Actress of the Year	Alessandra De Rossi	Firefly
Most Popular Child Performer of the Year	Euwenn Mikaell Aleta	Firefly
Most Popular Loveteam for Movies	Dingdong Dantes, Marian Rivera	Rewind
Most Popular Film Producers	Star Cinema (ABS-CBN Film Productions, Inc.), APT Entertainment, AgostoDos Pictures	Rewind
Most Popular Film Screenwriter	Enrico Santos	Rewind
Most Popular Film Director	Mae Cruz-Alviar	Rewind

==== Television ====
Award	Name of Winner	Show (for individual awards) / Network
Primetime TV Actor of the Year for	Dennis Trillo	Maria Clara at Ibarra
Primetime TV Actress of the Year	Barbie Forteza	Maria Clara at Ibarra
Daytime TV Actor of the Year	Richard Yap	Abot-Kamay na Pangarap
Daytime TV Actress of the Year	Jillian Ward	Abot-Kamay na Pangarap
Prince of Philippine Entertainment	Donny Pangilinan	
Princess of Philippine Entertainment	Belle Mariano	
TV Supporting Actor of the Year	Tirso Cruz III	Royal Blood
TV Supporting Actress of the Year	Pinky Amador	Abot-Kamay na Pangarap
Most Popular Loveteam for Television	Ruru Madrid, Bianca Umali	The Write One
Comedy Actor of the Year	Bong Revilla	Walang Matigas na Pulis sa Matinik na Misis
Comedy Actress of the Year	Beauty Gonzalez	Walang Matigas na Pulis sa Matinik na Misis
Most Popular TV Program (News & Public Affairs)	Kapuso Mo, Jessica Soho	GMA Network
Most Popular TV Program (Primetime Drama)	FPJ's Batang Quiapo	Kapamilya Channel, A2Z and TV5
Most Popular TV Program (Talk Show)	Fast Talk with Boy Abunda	GMA Network
Most Popular TV Program (Reality/Talent/Game)	Family Feud	GMA Network
Most Popular TV Program (Noontime/Musical-Variety)	ASAP Natin 'To	Kapamilya Channel, A2Z and TV5
Male TV Host of the Year	Luis Manzano	
Female TV Host of the Year	Maine Mendoza, Kim Chiu	Eat Bulaga!, It's Showtime

==== Music ====
Award	Name of Winner	Show or Song/Album
Concert of the Year	Sharon Cuneta, Gabby Concepcion	Dear Heart Concert Series
Male Concert Performer of the Year	Bamboo Mañalac	Sarah G x Bamboo
Female Concert Performer of the Year	Sarah Geronimo	Sarah G x Bamboo
Male Recording Artist of the Year	Darren	Bibitiw Na
Female Recording Artist of the Year	Moira Dela Torre	Ikaw at Sila Album
Most Popular Recording/Performing Group	SB19	Pagtatag World Tour

==== Special awards ====
Award	Name of Winner
Bert Marcelo Lifetime Achievement Award	Empoy Marquez
Corazon Samaniego Lifetime Achievement Award	Christopher de Leon
Box Office Iconic Star of Philippine Movies	Vilma Santos
Box Office Iconic Stars of Philippine Television	TVJ (Tito Sotto, Vic Sotto and Joey de Leon) for Eat Bulaga!
