= Box Office Entertainment Award for Box Office King =

Philippine entertainment award

- Awarded for: Attaining the Highest Box Office Record Film of the Year
- Country: Philippines
- Presented by: Guillermo Mendoza Memorial Scholarship Foundation
- First award: 1971
- Currently held by: Alden Richards, Five Breakups and a Romance (2023)

The Box Office Entertainment Award for Box Office King is an award presented annually by the Memorial Scholarship Foundation, led by Corazon Samaniego. It was first awarded at the 1st Box Office Entertainment Awards ceremony, held in 1971 and it is given in honor of an actor whose films set the highest box office record in the film industry.

== Winners ==
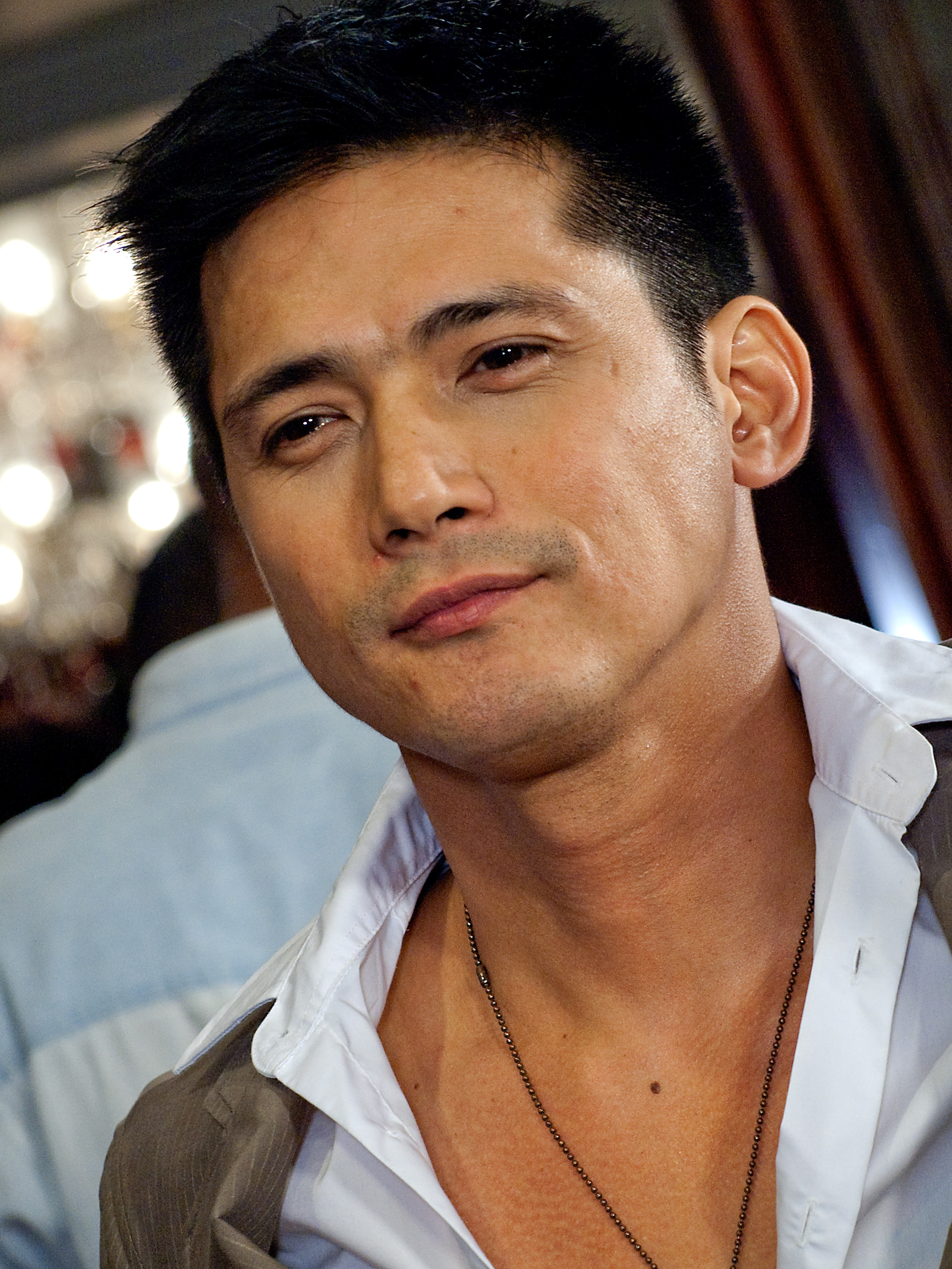
Robin Padilla has won several awards for the "Box Office King" title including his first win in 1992.

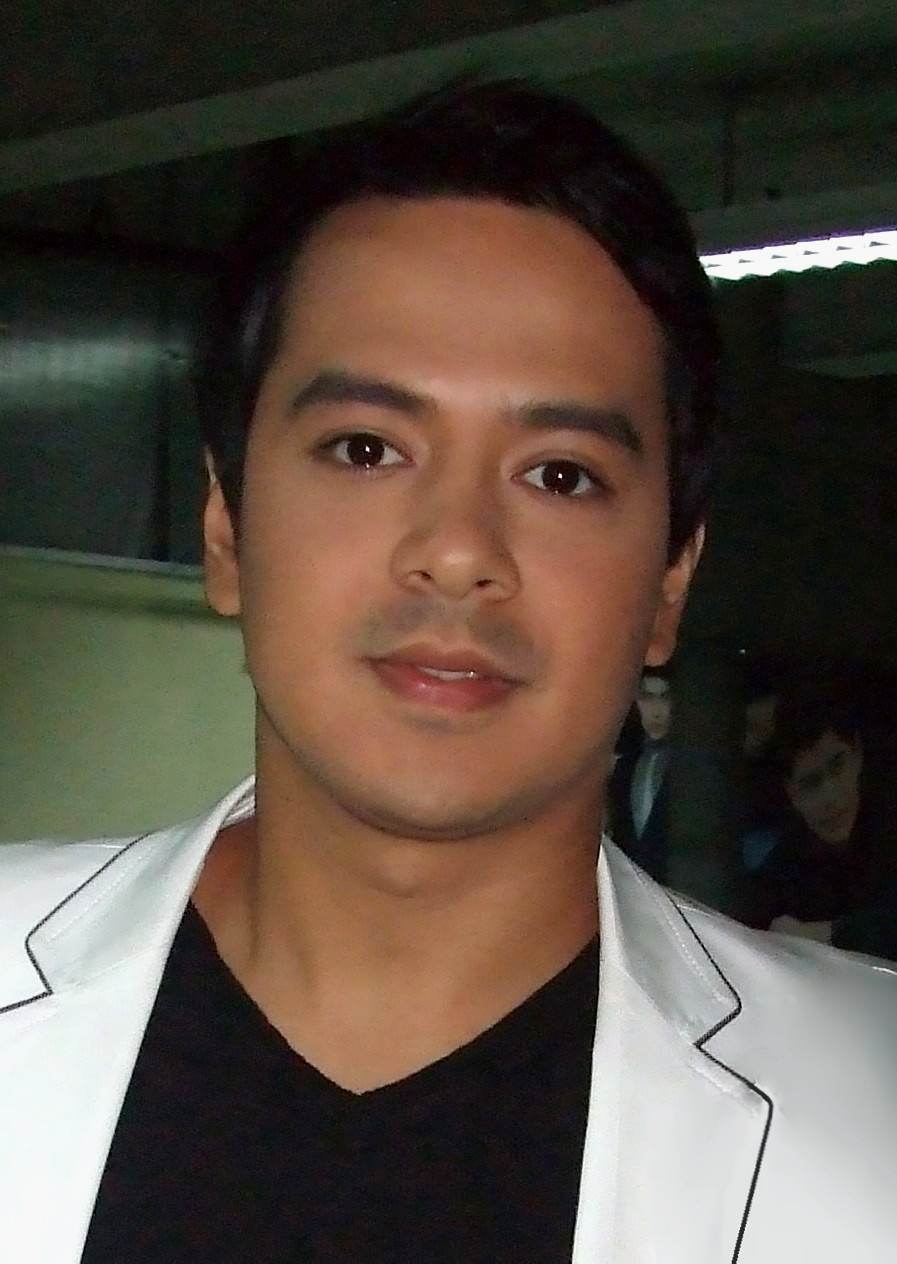
John Lloyd Cruz has won several awards for the "Box Office King" title including his first win in 2008 for his performance in One More Chance.

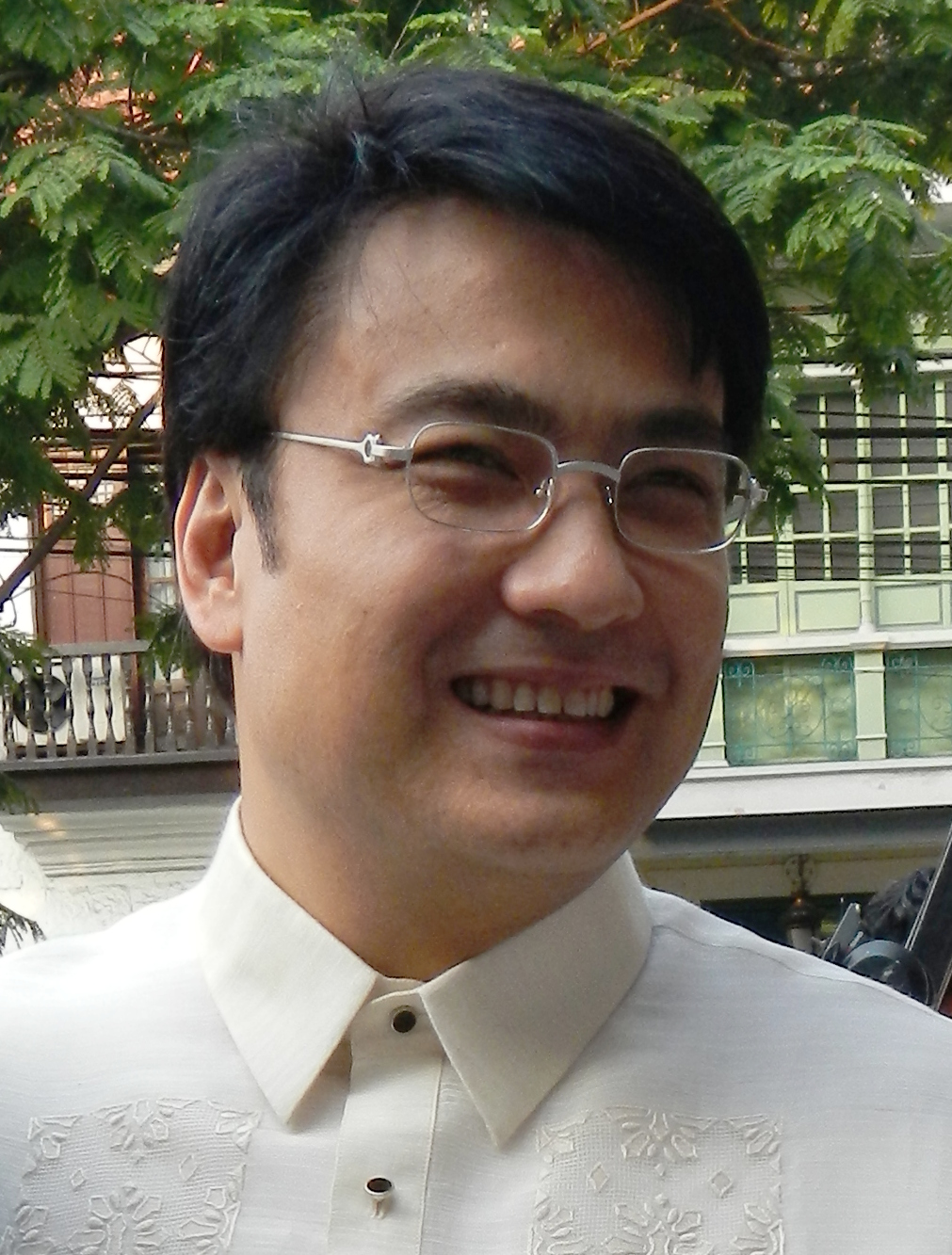
Bong Revilla has won the "Box Office King" subsequently including his first win in 1993.

Year	Actor
1970 (1st)	Joseph Estrada
1971 (2nd)	Dolphy Quizon
1972 (3rd)	Tirso Cruz III
1973 (4th)	Joseph Estrada
1974 (5th)	Fernando Poe, Jr
1975 (6th)	Dolphy Quizon
1976 (7th)	No Award
1977 (8th)	Rudy Fernandez
1978 (9th)	Fernando Poe, Jr.
1979 (10th)	Ramon Revilla
1980 (11th)	Dolphy Quizon
1981 (12th)	Dolphy Quizon
1982 (13th)	Fernando Poe Jr.
1983 (14th)	Fernando Poe Jr.
1984 (15th)	Fernando Poe Jr
1985 (16th)	Fernando Poe, Jr.
1986 (17th)	Fernando Poe, Jr.
1987 (18th)	Rudy Fernandez
1988 (19th)	Phillip Salvador
1989 (20th)	Joey de Leon
1990 (21st)	Rene Requiestas
1991 (22nd)	Robin Padilla
1992 (23rd)	Bong Revilla
1993 (24th)	Robin Padilla
1994 (25th)	Bong Revilla
1995 (26th)	Fernando Poe, Jr.
1996 (27th)	Christopher de Leon
1997 (28th)	Bong Revilla
1998 (29th)	Cesar Montano
1999 (30th)	Fernando Poe Jr.
2000 (31st)	Robin Padilla
2001 (32nd)	Aga Muhlach
2002 (33rd)	Aga Muhlach
2003 (34th)	Vic Sotto
2004 (35th)	Vic Sotto
2005 (36th)	Vic Sotto
2006 (37th)	Vic Sotto
2007 (38th)	John Lloyd Cruz
2008 (40th)	John Lloyd Cruz
2009 (41st)	John Lloyd Cruz
2010 (42nd)	Bong Revilla
2010 (42nd)	Vic Sotto
2011 (43rd)	Derek Ramsay
2012 (44th)	John Lloyd Cruz
2013 (45th)	John Lloyd Cruz
2014 (46th)	Piolo Pascual
2015 (47th)	Vic Sotto
2016 (48th)	Daniel Padilla
2017 (49th)	Enrique Gil
2018 (50th)	Vic Sotto
2018 (50th)	Coco Martin
2019 (51st)	Aga Muhlach
2023 (52nd)	Alden Richards

== Multiple wins ==
Actor	Record Set
Fernando Poe Jr.	9
Vic Sotto	7
John Lloyd Cruz	5
Dolphy Quizon	4
Bong Revilla	4
Aga Muhlach	3
Robin Padilla	3
Joseph Estrada	2
Rudy Fernandez	2
