= 2020 Box Office Entertainment Awards =

Annual Philippine entertainment awards

- Date: October 18, 2020 (originally scheduled for March 15, 2020)
- Location: Resorts World Manila, Newport Mall, Pasay (original location)
- Hosted by: Robi Domingo; Bianca Gonzalez

Television/radio coverage
- Network: TV5 (originally ABS-CBN)
- Runtime: 120 minutes (including commercials)
- Produced by: Airtime Marketing Phils., Inc. ContentCows Company, Inc.
- Directed by: Nico Faustino

The 51st Guillermo Mendoza Memorial Scholarship Foundation Box Office Entertainment Awards (GMMSF-BOEA) was an awarding ceremony honoring the actors, actresses, showbiz personalities, movies and TV programs in the Philippines. It was originally scheduled to take place at the Resorts World Manila, on March 15, 2020. However, because of the COVID-19 pandemic in the Philippines, it was rescheduled to October 18, 2020, having been taped before its telecast on new network TV5. Originally going to be aired on ABS-CBN, it was moved to TV5 due to the aforementioned network's free to air shutdown.

== Winners selection ==
The GMMSF honors Filipino actors, actresses and other performers' commercial success, regardless of artistic merit, in the Philippine entertainment industry. The award giving body selects the high-ranking Philippine films for the calendar year 2019 based on total average rankings at box office published results as basis for awarding the three major categories in the awarding ceremonies, The Phenomenal Box Office Star, The Box Office King and The Box Office Queen.

=== Winners ===
==== Film ====
| Award | Name of Winner | Movie / Show |
|---|---|---|
| Phenomenal Box Office Star | Kathryn Bernardo, Alden Richards | Hello, Love, Goodbye |
| Box Office King | Aga Muhlach | Miracle in Cell No. 7 |
| Box Office Queen | Xia Vigor | Miracle in Cell No. 7 |
| Film Actor of the Year | Alden Richards, Aga Muhlach | Hello, Love, Goodbye, Miracle in Cell No. 7 |
| Film Actress of the Year | Kathryn Bernardo | Hello, Love, Goodbye |
| Prince of Philippine Movies and Television | Enrique Gil | Alone/Together |
| Princess of Philippine Movies and Television | Liza Soberano | Alone/Together |
| Movie Supporting Actor of the Year | Joel Torre | Miracle in Cell No. 7 |
| Movie Supporting Actress of the Year | Bela Padilla | Miracle in Cell No. 7 |
| Most Popular Loveteam of Movies | Enrique Gil, Liza Soberano | Alone/Together |
| Most Promising Actor | JC Santos | Open (2019 film) |
| Most Promising Actress | Kim Molina | Jowable |
| Most Popular Film Producers | Olivia Lamasan, Carlo Katigbak | Star Cinema (ABS-CBN Film Productions, Inc.) |
| Most Popular Film Screenwriter | Carmi Raymundo /Rona Go/Cathy Garcia-Molina | Hello, Love, Goodbye |
| Most Popular Film Director | Cathy Garcia-Molina | Hello, Love, Goodbye |
| Comedy Actor of the Year | Paolo Ballesteros | The Panti Sisters |
| Comedy Actress of the Year | Maine Mendoza | Mission Unstapabol: The Don Identity |
| Best Acting Ensemble in a Movie | Miracle in Cell No. 7 | Viva Films |

==== Television ====
| Award | Name of Winner | Show (for individual awards) / Network |
|---|---|---|
| TV Actor of the Year for Primetime | Coco Martin | Ang Probinsyano |
| TV Actor of the Year for Daytime | JM de Guzman | Pamilya Ko |
| TV Actress of the Year for Primetime | Angel Locsin | The General's Daughter |
| TV Actress of the Year for Daytime TV | Dimples Romana | Kadenang Ginto |
| Prince of Philippine Television | Joshua Garcia | The Killer Bride |
| Princess of Philippine Television | Janella Salvador | The Killer Bride |
| TV Supporting Actor of the Year | Tirso Cruz III | The General's Daughter |
| TV Supporting Actress of the Year | Yassi Pressman | Ang Probinsyano |
| Most Popular Male Child Performer | Kenken Nuyad | Parasite Island |
| Most Popular Female Child Performer | Sophia Reola | Nang Ngumiti ang Langit |
| Most Popular Loveteam for Television | Miguel Tanfelix, Bianca Umali | Sahaya |
| Most Promising Loveteam for Television | Andrea Brillantes & Seth Fedelin | Kadenang Ginto |
| Most Promising Male Star for Television | Kyle Echarri | Kadenang Ginto |
| Most Promising Female Star for Television | Francine Diaz | Kadenang Ginto |
| Most Popular TV Program for News & Public Affairs | 24 Oras | GMA Network |
| Most Popular TV Program for Primetime Drama | Ang Probinsyano | ABS-CBN |
| Most Popular TV Program for Daytime Drama | Kadenang Ginto | ABS-CBN |
| Most Popular TV Program for Talent Search, Reality, Talk and Game Show | Magandang Buhay | ABS-CBN |
| Most Popular TV Program for Musical-Variety | ASAP Natin 'To | ABS-CBN |
| Male TV Host of the Year | Jose Manalo, Wally Bayola, Paolo Ballesteros | Eat Bulaga! |
| Female TV Host of the Year | Toni Gonzaga | Pinoy Big Brother: Otso, The Voice Kids |
| Best Ensemble Performance | The General's Daughter | ABS-CBN |

==== Music ====
| Award | Name of Winner |
|---|---|
| Male Concert Performer of the Year | Martin Nievera |
| Female Concert Performer of the Year | Lea Salonga |
| Group Concert Performer of the Year | Aegis |
| Male Recording Artist of the Year | Gary Valenciano |
| Female Recording Artist of the Year | Regine Velasquez |
| Most Popular Recording/Performing Group | December Avenue |
| Most Promising Male Recording Artist of the Year | Anthony Rosaldo |
| Most Promising Female Recording Artist of the Year | Maris Racal |
| New Male Concert Performer of the Year | Ian Veneracion |
| New Female Concert Performer of the Year | Kiana Valenciano |
| Most Promising Recording/Performing Group | SB19 |

==== Other Awards ====
| Award | Name of Winner |
|---|---|
| Popular Male Influencer of the Year | Raffy Tulfo |
| Popular Female Influencer of the Year | Alex Gonzaga |

==== Special awards ====
| Award | Name of Winner |
|---|---|
| All-Time Favorite Actor | Christopher de Leon |
| All-Time Favorite Actress | Lorna Tolentino |
