= Box Office Entertainment Awards =

Philippine entertainment awards

- Current: 2025 Box Office Entertainment Awards
- Awarded for: Excellence in commercial success
- Country: Philippines
- Presented by: Guillermo Mendoza Memorial Scholarship Foundation
- First award: 1971

The Box Office Entertainment Awards, sometimes known as the GMMSF Box Office Entertainment Awards, is an annual award ceremony held in Metro Manila and organized by Guillermo Mendoza Memorial Scholarship Foundation. The award-giving body honors stars and performers simply for their popularity and commercial success in the Philippine entertainment industry, regardless of their excellence in their particular fields.

During the first months of each year, mostly during March or April, the Guillermo Mendoza Memorial Scholarship Foundation board of jurors will deliberate for the year's winners, which will be chosen from the Top 10 Philippine films of the past year, top-rating shows in Philippine television, top recording awards received by singers, and top gross receipts of concerts and performances. The list will then be released prior to the awards night, which is held during April or May.

== History ==
Ferdie Syquia Villar, the person who launched the "Miss Republic of the Philippines" contest, came up with the "Box Office King and Queen Awards" in 1960s, and formally launched his idea in 1970. By the late '70s, after then President Ferdinand Marcos declared Martial Law in 1972, he turned the responsibility over to Corazon Samaniego before leaving for abroad.

Corazon Samaniego, a former businesswoman in Bulacan, continued the presentation and officially inaugurated the "Guillermo Mendoza Memorial Scholarship Foundation Inc." in 1971. The organization is named after a former Bulacan town mayor and philanthropist and her late father, Guillermo Mendoza. It became an annual event, recognizing the most popular people and their works in the Philippine entertainment industry. At the end of the day, the proceeds from the television rights and gate receipts are used to send underprivileged Bulacan students to school.

=== Records ===
Vice Ganda has the most phenomenal box office star titles with eight, he is also the first person to receive this award in 2012.

Vilma Santos has the most box office queen titles in history with ten.

Fernando Poe Jr. has the most box office king titles in history with nine.

=== Milestones ===
- 1960s: The first "Box Office King and Queen" was introduced by Ferdie Syquia Villar. The late Fernando "Ronnie"., Poe, Jr. and Boots Anson-Roa were actually the first recipients of the "Box Office King and Queen of Philippine Movies" title in 1968. Subsequently, Ronnie became a regular recipient of the award as if to certify that he is the "King of Philippine Movies" or "Da King"
- 1971: The award-giving body was officially established in the year 1971 after the turn-over. Nora Aunor won the "Box Office Queen" award for the Guillermo Mendoza Foundation.
- 2006: The former "Box Office King and Queen Awards" was renamed to "Box Office Entertainment Awards". Together with the name change, some categories were also altered. For example, the former "Mr. and Miss RP Movies" and "Prince and Princess of RP Movies" titles became "Film Actor and Actress of the Year" and "Prince and Princess of Philippine Movies" respectively.
- 2007: For the first time, there were two recipients for the "Box Office Queen". Kris Aquino and Claudine Barretto received the award for their film Sukob under Star Cinema.
- 2009: This was the 39th year of the annual event; however, the organization believes that 39 is an unlucky number. Thus they skipped 39 and consider this event the 40th instead.
- 2012: The award-giving body officially introduced a new award called "Phenomenal Box Office Star", which is given to the actor(s) whose film attains the highest-grossing film of all time in the Philippines. It was given to Vice Ganda for his fim The Unkabogable Praybeyt Benjamin, which received ₱332 million.
- 2024: Marian Rivera and Dingdong Dantes were awarded Box-Office Phenomenal Stars of Philippine Cinema for their comeback film Rewind which was recognized as the highest-grossing Philippine film of all time, surpassing the 2019 film Hello, Love, Goodbye. It was said in the show that the movie grossed over ₱924 million pesos, which marks the first time for a Philippine film to reach 900 million pesos in the local box office and the highest grossing movie in the history of Metro Manila Film Festival.
- 2025: Kathryn Bernardo and Alden Richards were awarded with the Phenomenal Box Office King and Queen for their movie Hello, Love, Again which is the first Philippine movie to gross over ₱1.6 billion at the local box office, becoming the highest grossing Filipino movie of all time. It is the first Filipino movie to break the North American Box Office top 10 movie chart, placing at number 8 against foreign films and the first Filipino movie to be included in the 2024 Worldwide Box Office chart in Box Office Mojo.

== Award ceremonies ==
Ceremonies	Year	Awards Night Venue	Date	Ref.
1st Box Office Entertainment Awards	1971			
2nd Box Office Entertainment Awards	1972			
3rd Box Office Entertainment Awards	1973			
4th Box Office Entertainment Awards	1974			
5th Box Office Entertainment Awards	1975			
6th Box Office Entertainment Awards	1976			
7th Box Office Entertainment Awards	1977			
8th Box Office Entertainment Awards	1978			
9th Box Office Entertainment Awards	1979			
10th Box Office Entertainment Awards	1980			
11th Box Office Entertainment Awards	1981			
12th Box Office Entertainment Awards	1982			
13th Box Office Entertainment Awards	1983			
14th Box Office Entertainment Awards	1984			
15th Box Office Entertainment Awards	1985			
16th Box Office Entertainment Awards	1986			
17th Box Office Entertainment Awards	1987			
18th Box Office Entertainment Awards	1988			
19th Box Office Entertainment Awards	1989	Celebrity Sports Plaza Grand Ballroom	April 14	
20th Box Office Entertainment Awards	1990			
21st Box Office Entertainment Awards	1991			
22nd Box Office Entertainment Awards	1992			
23rd Box Office Entertainment Awards	1993			
24th Box Office Entertainment Awards	1994			
25th Box Office Entertainment Awards	1995			
26th Box Office Entertainment Awards	1996			
27th Box Office Entertainment Awards	1997			
28th Box Office Entertainment Awards	1998			
29th Box Office Entertainment Awards	1999			
30th Box Office Entertainment Awards	2000			
31st Box Office Entertainment Awards	2001	UP Theater	April 4	
32nd Box Office Entertainment Awards	2002	UP Theater	April 10	
33rd Box Office Entertainment Awards	2003	Henry Lee Erwin Theater, Ateneo de Manila University, Quezon City	April 10	
34th Box Office Entertainment Awards	2004	Aliw Theater, CCP Complex, Roxas Blvd., Pasay	March 21	
35th Box Office Entertainment Awards	2005	Meralco Theater, Pasig	April 13	
36th Box Office Entertainment Awards	2006	RCBC Plaza, Ayala Avenue, Makati	March 19	
37th Box Office Entertainment Awards	2007	Carlos Romulo Auditorium, RCBC Plaza, Ayala Avenue, Makati	April 25	
38th Box Office Entertainment Awards	2008	RCBC Plaza, Ayala Avenue, Makati	May 13	
40th Box Office Entertainment Awards^{1}	2009	Carlos P. Romulo Auditorium, RCBC Plaza, Ayala Avenue, Makati	June 21	
41st Box Office Entertainment Awards	2010	Carlos P. Romulo Auditorium, RCBC Plaza, Ayala Avenue, Makati	June 10	
42nd Box Office Entertainment Awards	2011	RCBC Plaza, Ayala Avenue, Makati,	May 10	
43rd Box Office Entertainment Awards	2012	RCBC Plaza, Makati	April 29	
44th Box Office Entertainment Awards	2013	AFP Theatre, Camp Aguinaldo, Quezon City	May 19	
45th Box Office Entertainment Awards	2014	Solaire Resort & Casino, Parañaque	May 18	
46th Box Office Entertainment Awards	2015	Solaire Resort & Casino, Parañaque	June 14	
47th Box Office Entertainment Awards	2016	Kia Theatre, Araneta Center, Quezon City	April 17	
48th Box Office Entertainment Awards	2017	Henry Lee Irwin Theater in Ateneo de Manila University, Quezon City	May 14	
49th Box Office Entertainment Awards	2018	Newport Performing Arts Theater in Resorts World Manila, Pasay	May 20	
50th Box Office Entertainment Awards	2019	Star Theater, CCP Complex, Pasay	March 24	
51st Box Office Entertainment Awards	2020	Newport Performing Arts Theater in Resorts World Manila, Pasay (originally planned)	March 15 (postponed due to coronavirus); October 18	
52nd Box Office Entertainment Awards	2024	Henry Lee Irwin Theater, Ateneo de Manila University	May 12 (May 25 - television broadcast)	
53rd Box Office Entertainment Awards	2025	CPR Auditorium, RCBC Buildings, Makati City	June 28, 2025 (July 13 - television broadcast)	

^{1}The yearly event is supposed to be the 39th year, but they believe that it is an unlucky number. Thus they skipped the 39th and consider this event the 40th instead.

== Merit categories ==
=== Major awards ===
- Phenomenal Box Office Star
- Box Office King
- Box Office Queen

=== Other awards ===
==== Film category ====
- Film Actor of the Year
- Film Actress of the Year
- Movie Supporting Actor of the Year
- Movie Supporting Actress of the Year
- Most Popular Loveteam in Movies
- Most Popular Child Performer of the Year
- Most Popular Film Producer
- Most Popular Film Director
- Most Popular Film Screenwriter

==== Television category ====
- Primetime TV Actor of the Year
- Primetime TV Actress of the Year
- Daytime TV Actor of the Year
- Daytime TV Actress of the Year
- TV Supporting Actor of the Year
- TV Supporting Actress of the Year
- Most Popular Loveteam for Television
- Comedy Actor of the Year
- Comedy Actress of the Year
- Male TV Host of the Year
- Female TV Host of the Year
- Most Popular TV Program (News & Public Affairs)
- Most Popular TV Program (Primetime Drama)
- Most Popular TV Program (Talk Show)
- Most Popular TV Program (Reality/Talent/Game)
- Most Popular TV Program (Noontime/Musical-Variety)

==== Music category ====
- Male Recording Artist of the Year
- Female Recording Artist of the Year
- Male Concert Performer of the Year
- Female Concert Performer of the Year
- Most Popular Recording/Performing Group
- Concert of the Year

==== Recurring awards ====
- Bert Marcelo Lifetime Achievement Award
- Corazon Samaniego Lifetime Achievement Award
- Box Office Iconic Stars of Philippine Television
- Box Office Iconic Stars of Philippine Movies
- Prince of Philippine Entertainment
- Princess of Philippine Entertainment

=== Discontinued awards ===
- All-Time Favorite Actor
- All-Time Favorite Actress
- Golden Jury Award
- Valentine Box Office King
- Valentine Box Office Queen
- Teen King of Philippine Movies
- Teen Queen of Philippine Movies
- Phenomenal Box Office Child Star
- Phenomenal Box Office Tandem
- Prince of Philippine Movies
- Princess of Philippine Movies
- Prince of Philippine Television
- Princess of Philippine Television
- Best Acting Ensemble in a Movie
- Best Ensemble Performance
- Most Promising Actor
- Most Promising Actress
- Most Promising Male Star of the Year
- Most Promising Female Star of the Year
- Most Promising Loveteam
- Most Popular Male Child Performer
- Most Popular Female Child Performer
- Most Promising Male Singer/Performer
- Most Promising Female Singer/Performer
- New Male Concert Performer of the Year
- New Female Concert Performer of the Year
- Most Popular Male Novelty Singer
- Most Popular Female Novelty Singer
- Popular Male Influencer of the Year
- Popular Female Influencer of the Year
- Stuntman of the Year
- Female Stunt of the Year
- Global Achievement by a Filipino
- Global Entrepreneur Award
- Outstanding Government Service Award
- Outstanding Public Service Award
- Outstanding Businessman Award
- Outstanding Businesswoman Award
- Outstanding Celebrity Businessman of the Year

== Controversies ==
The following are the controversies of the award ceremonies:

- 1986: Maricel Soriano should have won Box-Office Queen for Batang Quiapo. Her co-star FPJ was named Box-Office King. But she was named Ms. RP for Movies instead. She didn’t attend the Awarding thus she was never awarded the Box-Office Queen ever.
- 2003: Many questioned Aga Muhlach's win as the "Box Office King" after the official list of winners were released. In particular, the fans of the late Rico Yan contested, saying that his last film Got 2 Believe was the highest-grossing film of the year. Although they were not personally against Muhlach, they believed that the award-giving body should give an explanation.
- 2006: Questions from the readers arose after the organization chose Kristine Hermosa for the "Box Office Queen" title. They argued that there were more deserving actresses to receive the title over Hermosa, who only had one film that year. Furthermore, they believed that her one and only film, Enteng Kabisote 2: Okay Ka Fairy Ko: The Legend Continues, was actually successful because of her leading man, Vic Sotto, who was the "Box Office King" of 2005. Thus, most, if not all, the credit goes to Sotto, not hers.
- 2008: There was speculation that Judy Ann Santos would not win any of the awards from the award-giving body anymore. Although her 2006 films Don't Give Up on Us and Kasal, Kasali, Kasalo, and the latter's sequel Sakal, Sakali, Saklolo in 2007 were all box office hits, top-grossing films in fact, she did not win any of the awards. Furthermore, not even Ryan Agoncillo, her leading man and real life partner, nor the director of the two films Joey Reyes won an award. They believed that it all started during the awards night of the 30th award ceremony in 2000 wherein "Box Office King and Queen" winners Fernando Poe Jr. and Judy Ann Santos of Isusumbong Kita sa Tatay Ko were not able to attend. Santos had a taping at that time, while FPJ does not want to be crowned without his queen. The next year, and until now, they were not able to receive any of the awards anymore, not even nominees nor special mentions despite them having box office films. They believe that the award-giving body disqualified Santos as they took her (and FPJ's) absence personally.
- 2011: There were reports that Bea Alonzo was a snob to Gerald Anderson during the awards night as he was linked to her before. Alonzo denied the issue, however, explaining that her seat is far from him. Since she was already a latecomer, she does not want to make a scene by going there just to get his attention.

It was also believed that there was a leakage of the winners list, saying that the "Box Office Queen" title would be given to Toni Gonzaga for her film My Amnesia Girl. However, many even speculated that Ai-Ai delas Alas would receive the title for her box office movie Ang Tanging Ina Mo (Last na 'To!). In the end, the latter received the award.

- 2013: There were rumors that the organization was disappointed with John Lloyd Cruz for not attending the awards night. Cruz, as the report says, promised to attend the event to receive the "Box Office King" award personally. However, he was not seen throughout the event, saying that he was sick. In contrast, the speculations point out that Cruz attended another event, instead.

== See also ==
- List of Asian television awards
