= 2011 Box Office Entertainment Awards =

Annual Philippine entertainment awards

- Date: May 10, 2011
- Location: Manila

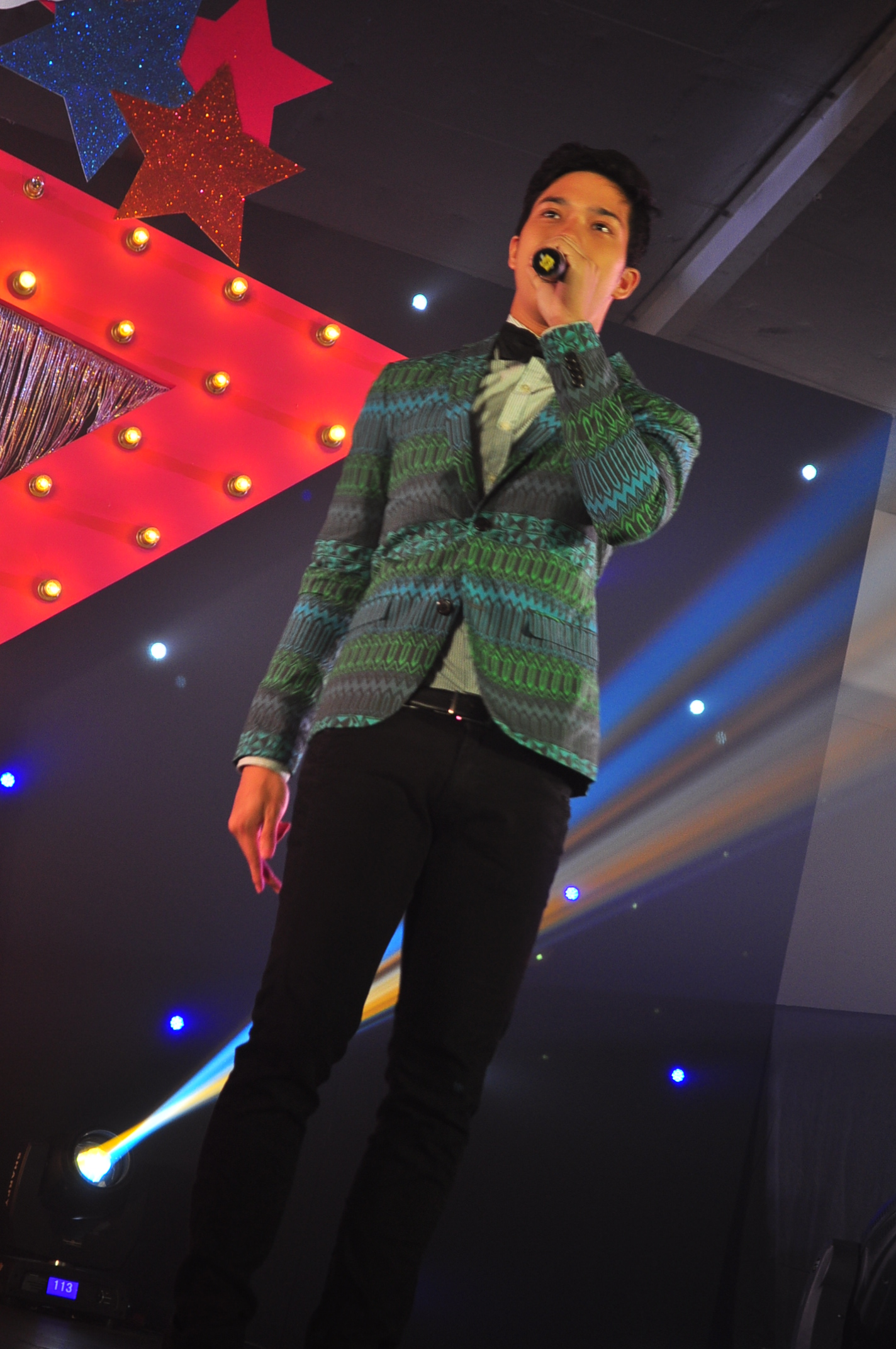
Elmo Magalona, Most Promising Love Team winner (with Julie Anne San Jose).

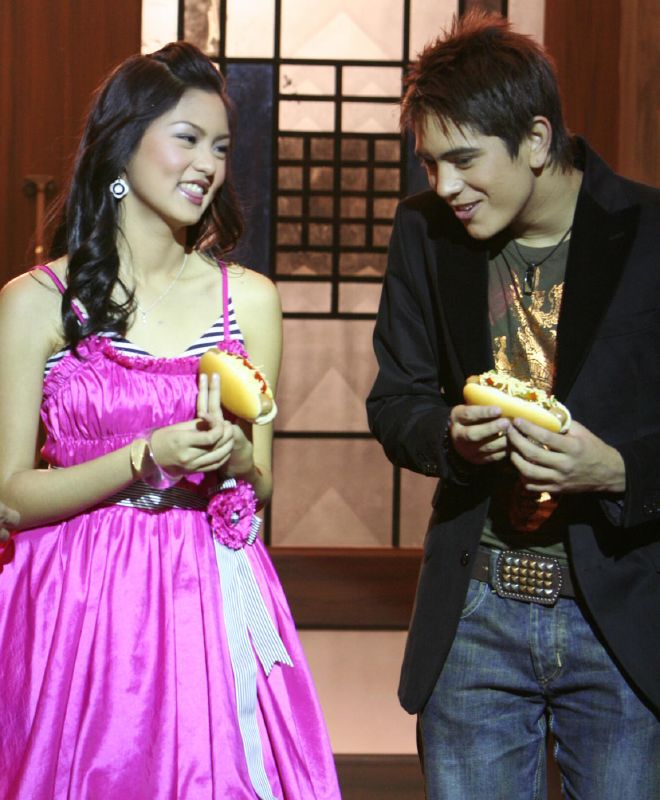
Kim Chiu (right) and Gerald Anderson (left), Most Popular Love Team of Movies & TV winners.

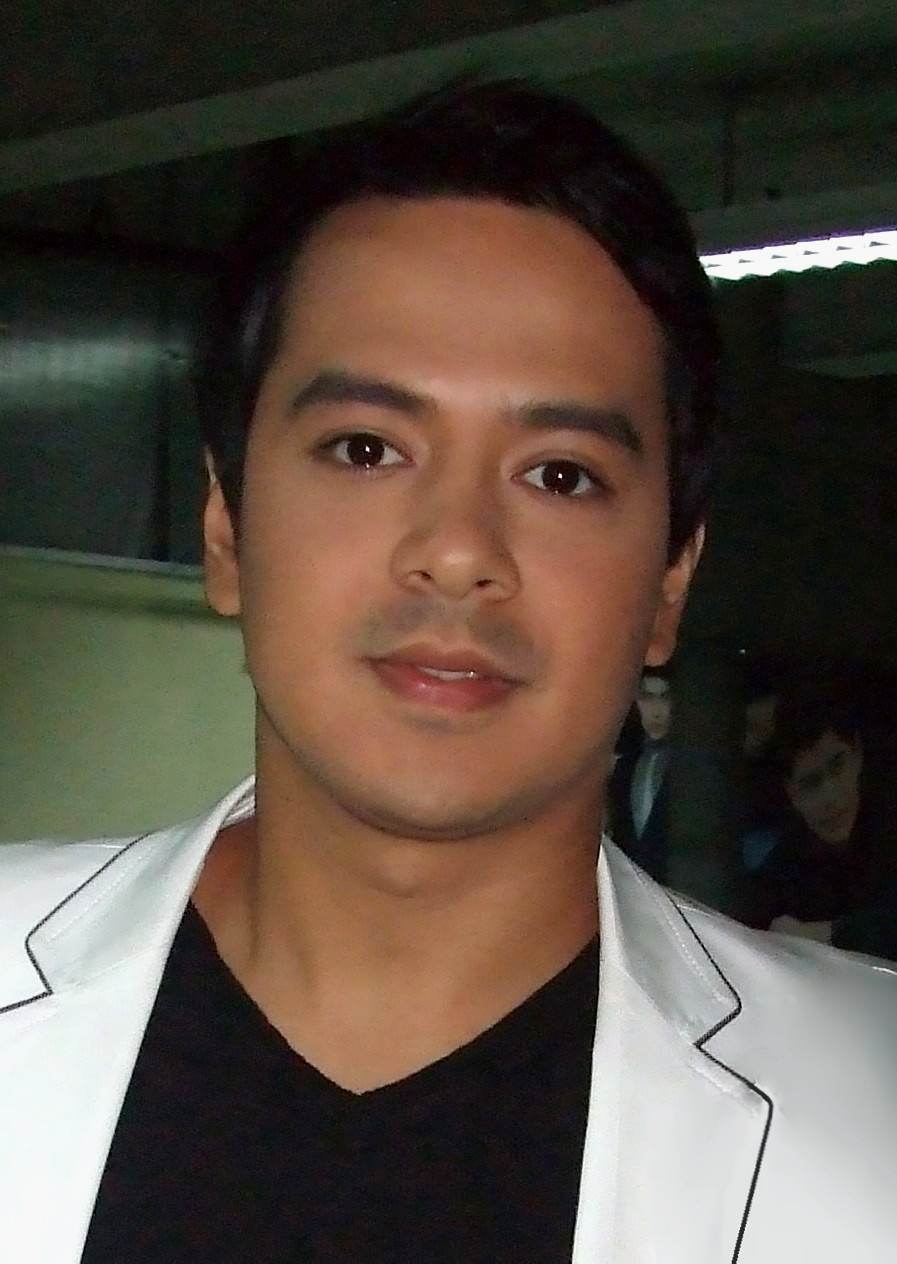
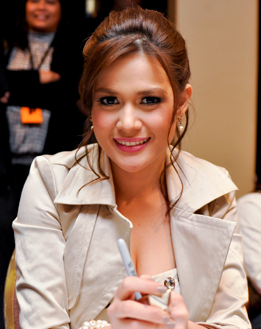
John Lloyd Cruz (left) and Bea Alonzo (right), Film Actor and Actress of the Year winners.
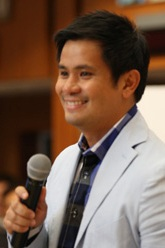
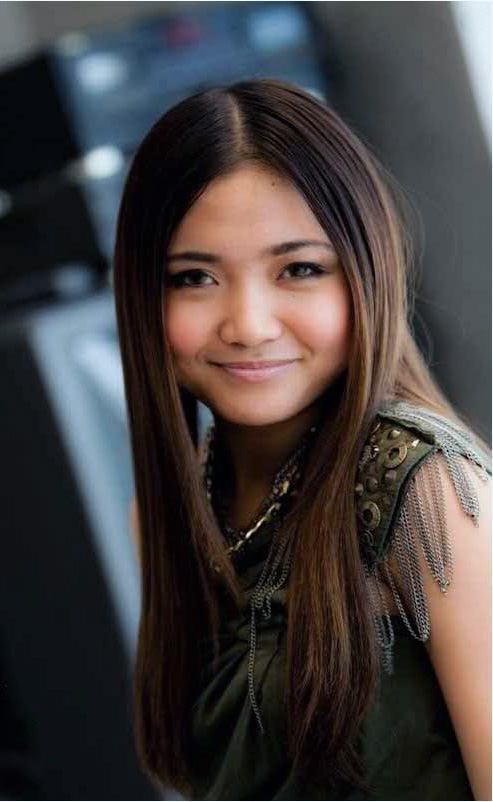
Ogie Alcasid (left) and Charice (right), Male and Female Concert Performer of the Year winners.
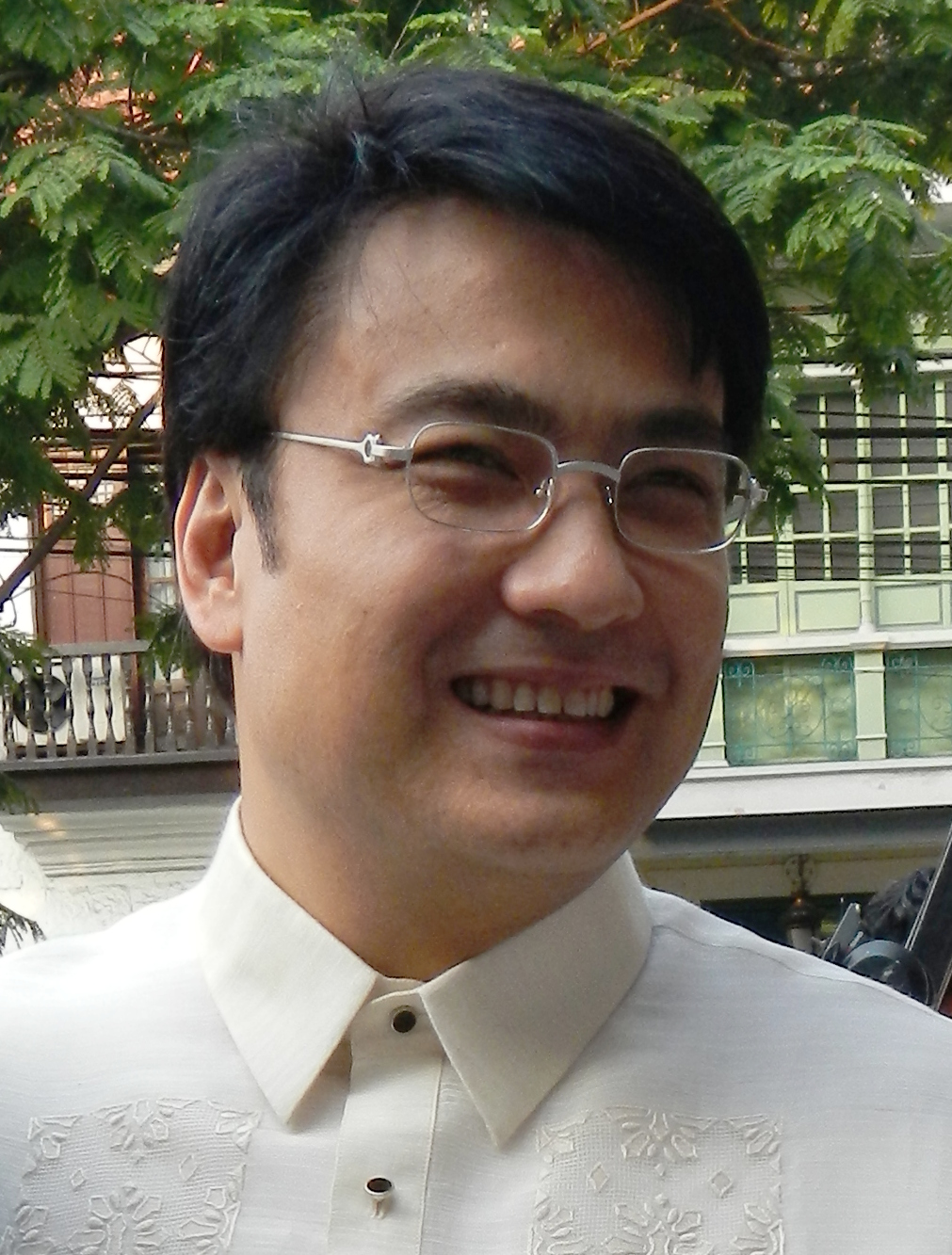
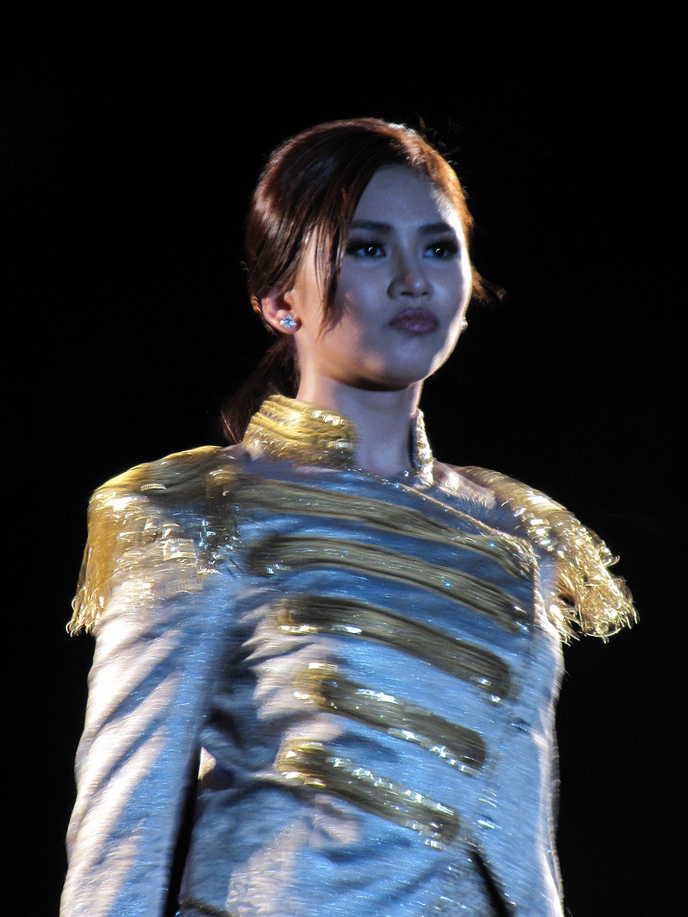
Bong Revilla (left) and Sarah Geronimo (right), Box Office King and Female Recording Artist of the Year winners.

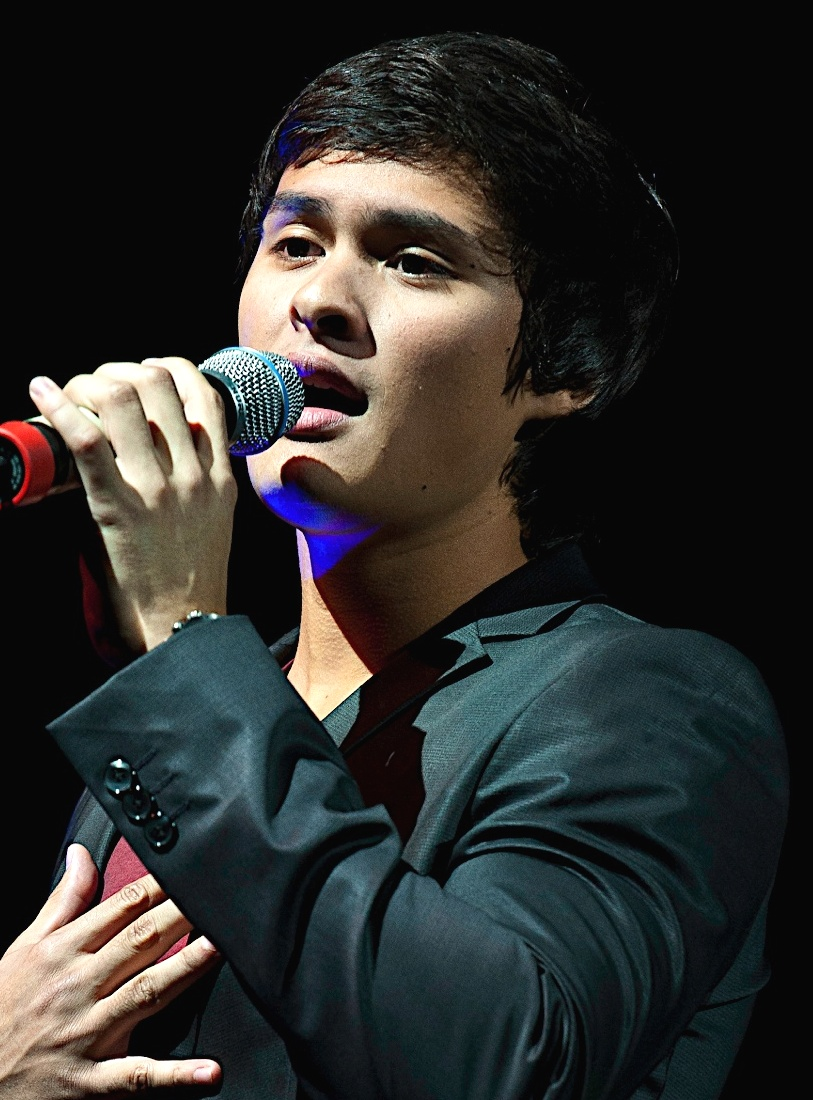
Matteo Guidicelli, Most Promising Male Star of the Year

The 42nd Guillermo Mendoza Memorial Scholarship Foundation Box Office Entertainment Awards (GMMSF-BOEA) is a part of the annual awards in the Philippines held on May 10, 2011. The award-giving body honors Filipino actors, actresses and other performers' commercial success, regardless of artistic merit, in the Philippine entertainment industry.

== Winners selection ==
On April 8, the Memorial Scholarship Foundation board of jurors met in the Danes Publishing House, Mindanao Avenue in Quezon City and deliberated for this year's winners.

The winners were chosen from the Top 10 Philippine films of 2010, top-rating shows in Philippine television, top recording awards received by singers, and top gross receipts of concerts and performances.

== Awards ceremony ==
On May 10, 2011 at RCBC Plaza, Ayala Avenue in Makati, Philippines, the 42nd Box Office Entertainment Awards night was held, with the night's hosts John Estrada and Precious Lara Quigaman.

=== Awards ===
==== Major awards ====
- Box Office Kings - Vic Sotto & Bong Revilla (Si Agimat at Si Enteng Kabisote)
- Box Office Queen - Ai Ai delas Alas (Ang Tanging Ina Mo (Last na 'To!))
- Male Concert Performer of the Year - Ogie Alcasid
- Female Concert Performer of the Year - Charice
- Male Recording Artist of the Year - Christian Bautista
- Female Recording Artist of the Year - Sarah Geronimo

==== Film category ====
- Film Actor of the Year - John Lloyd Cruz (Miss You like Crazy)
- Film Actress of the Year - Bea Alonzo (Miss You like Crazy)
- Prince of Philippine Movies & TV - Coco Martin (Sa 'yo Lamang)
- Princess of Philippine Movies & TV - Toni Gonzaga (My Amnesia Girl)
- Most Promising Male Star of the Year - Matteo Guidicelli
- Most Promising Female Star of the Year - Andi Eigenmann
- Most Popular Film Producer - Star Cinema
- Most Popular Film Director - Tony Y. Reyes (Si Agimat at Si Enteng Kabisote) & Wenn Deramas (Ang Tanging Ina Mo (Last na 'To!))
- Most Popular Screenwriter - Chris Martinez (Here Comes The Bride)

==== Music category ====
- Promising Singer/Performer - Jovit Baldivino
- Most Popular Recording/Performing Group - Parokya ni Edgar
- Most Promising Recording/Performing Group - XLR8
- Most Popular Novelty Singers - Chris Tsuper & Nicole Hyala

==== Television category ====
- Most Popular Love Team of Movies & TV - Gerald Anderson & Kim Chiu (Kung Tayo'y Magkakalayo - ABS-CBN)
- Most Promising Love Team - Elmo Magalona & Julie Anne San Jose (GMA-7)
- Most Popular Male/Female Child Performer - Jillian Ward (GMA-7)
- Most Popular TV Drama Program - Kung Tayo'y Magkakalayo (ABS-CBN)
- Most Popular TV Talent Search Program - Talentadong Pinoy (TV5)
- Most Popular TV News Program - 24 Oras (GMA-7)
- Most Popular TV Directors - Erick Salud & Trina Dayrit (Kung Tayo'y Magkakalayo - ABS-CBN) and Rich Ilustre (Talentadong Pinoy - (TV5)

=== Special awards ===
- Bert Marcelo Memorial Award - Vice Ganda
- Comedy Actor of the Year - John Lapus
- Comedy Actress of the Year - Angelica Panganiban

== Multiple awards ==
=== Companies with multiple awards ===
The following companies received two or more awards in the television category:

Awards	Company
3	ABS-CBN
3	GMA-7
2	TV5
