= 2015 Box Office Entertainment Awards =

Annual Philippine entertainment awards

- Date: June 14, 2015
- Location: Solaire Resort & Casino, Parañaque

The 46th Guillermo Mendoza Memorial Scholarship Foundation Box Office Entertainment Awards (GMMSF-BOEA), honored the personalities, movies and TV programs in the Philippines, and took place on June 14, 2015 at the Solaire Resort & Casino, Parañaque. The award-giving body honors Filipino actors, actresses and other performers' commercial success, regardless of artistic merit, in the Philippine entertainment industry.

== Winners selection ==
The GMMSF selects the high-ranking Philippine films of 2014 based on total average rankings at box office published results (MMFF has not released the final gross tally for the 2014 edition.) as basis for awarding the three major categories in the awarding ceremonies, The Phenomenal Box Office Star, The Box Office King and The Box Office Queen.

The deliberations were held at the Barrio Fiesta Restaurant in Greenhills, San Juan on May 16, 2015 attended by the representatives of GMMSF. New Special Awards were introduced at this event. This includes the Corazon Mendoza Samaniego Lifetime Achievement Award, which was given to Vic Sotto. Also included in the new Special Awards were the Breakthrough Box Office Indie Film Award, as well as the All-Time Highest Grossing Horror Film Award.

== Awards ==
- Phenomenal Box Office Star
  - Vice Ganda (The Amazing Praybeyt Benjamin)
- Box Office King
  - Piolo Pascual (Starting Over Again)
- Box Office Queen
  - Toni Gonzaga (Starting Over Again)
- Film Actor of the Year
  - John Lloyd Cruz
- Film Actress of the Year
  - Iza Calzado
- Prince of Philippine Movies & TV
  - Xian Lim
- Princess of Philippine Movies & TV
  - Kim Chiu
- Teen King of Philippine Movies & TV
  - Daniel Padilla
- Teen Queen of Philippine Movies & TV
  - Kathryn Bernardo
- Most Popular Love Team of Movies and TV
  - James Reid & Nadine Lustre
- Most Promising Love Team on TV
  - Iñigo Pascual & Sofia Andres (Relax It’s Just Pag-ibig)
- Most Promising Male Star
  - Andre Paras
- Most Promising Female Star
  - Liza Soberano
- Male Concert Performer of the Year
  - Gary Valenciano
- Female Concert Performer of the Year
  - Regine Velasquez
- Male Recording Artist of the Year
  - Gloc 9
- Female Recording Artist of the Year
  - Sarah Geronimo
- Promising Male Recording Artist of the Year
  - Darren Espanto
- Promising Female Recording Artist of the Year
  - Maja Salvador
- Most Popular Recording/Performing Group
  - Callalily
- Most Promising Recording/Performing Group
  - Gimme 5
- Most Popular Novelty Singer
  - Joey Ayala (Papel)
- Breakthrough Recording/Performing Artist
  - Alden Richards (Wish I May)
- Most Popular Male Child Performer
  - Bimby Aquino Yap
- Most Popular Female Child Performer
  - Ryzza Mae Dizon
- Most Popular Film Producer
  - Star Cinema
- Most Popular Screenwriter
  - Carmi Raymundo & Olivia Lamasan (Starting All Over Again)
- Most Popular Film Director
  - Wenn Deramas (The Amazing Praybeyt Benjamin)
- Most Popular TV Program for News and Public Affairs
  - Kapuso Mo, Jessica Soho (GMA 7)
- Most Popular Daytime Drama
  - Be Careful With My Heart (ABS-CBN 2)
- Most Popular Primetime Drama
  - Ikaw Lamang (ABS-CBN 2)
- Most Popular News and Public Affairs Program
  - Wish Ko Lang (GMA 7)
- Most Popular TV Talent/Reality Program
  - The Voice Kids (ABS-CBN 2)
- Most Popular TV Game Show
  - Celebrity Bluff (GMA 7)
- Most Popular TV Program for Noontime/Variety
  - Eat Bulaga! (GMA 7)

== Special awards ==
- Bert Marcelo Lifetime Achievement Award
  - Angelica Panganiban
- Corazon Samaniego Lifetime Achievement Award
  - Vic Sotto
- Breakthrough Box Office Indie Film
  - English Only Please; Special recognition for Derek Ramsay and Jennylyn Mercado as lead actors
- Highest Grossing Horror Film of All Time
  - Feng Shui 2 (P256 million)
- Global Achievement by a Performing Group
  - El Gamma Penumbra (Asia’s Got Talent champion)
- Global Achievement in Sports
  - Michael Christian Martinez (figure skater, 2014 Winter Olympics)
