= Jaime Rivera =

Mexican swimmer

Personal information
- Full name: Jaime Rivera Rodríguez
- Born: 29 May 1949 (age 77) Guadalajara, Mexico

Sport
- Sport: Swimming

Jaime Rivera Rodríguez (born 29 May 1949) is a Mexican former swimmer. He competed in two events at the 1968 Summer Olympics.
