= RCBC Plaza =

- Interactive map of the RCBC Plaza area

General information
- Status: Completed
- Type: Office
- Location: 6819 Ayala Avenue corner Gil Puyat Avenue, 1227 Makati, Philippines
- Coordinates: 14°33′38.74″N 121°0′59.52″E
- Construction started: 1996
- Completed: 2001
- Opening: 2001
- Cost: US$400 million
- Owner: RCBC Realty Corporation

Height
- Roof: Yuchengco Tower: 192 m (629.92 ft); Tower 2: 170 m (557.74 ft)

Technical details
- Floor count: Yuchengco Tower: 46 aboveground, 7 belowground Tower 2: 41 aboveground, 7 belowground
- Floor area: Yuchengco Tower: 79,757 m^{2} (858,000 sq ft); Tower 2: 71,368 m^{2} (768,000 sq ft)
- Lifts/elevators: Yuchengco Tower: 24; Tower 2: 19

Design and construction
- Architects: Skidmore, Owings and Merrill, LLD; W.V. Coscolluela & Associates
- Developer: RCBC Realty Corporation
- Structural engineer: Magnusson Klemencic Associates, formerly Skilling Ward Magnusson Barkshire; R.S. Caparros Associates & Company
- Main contractor: EEI Corporation in Joint Venture with Walter Construction of Australia (Formerly Concrete Constructions) and Walter Bau of Germany - ECW JV

RCBC Plaza is an office skyscraper complex located in Makati, Philippines. It is home to the offices of the Rizal Commercial Banking Corporation (RCBC) and is composed of two buildings: the taller RCBC Plaza Yuchengco Tower (Tower 1) and the smaller RCBC Plaza Tower 2. The taller tower stands at 192 meters (630 ft) from the ground to its architectural top, and is currently the 8th tallest complete building in Makati, and is the 16th-tallest building in the Philippines, while the shorter tower stands at 170 meters (560 ft). At the time of its completion, the complex, as a whole, was considered by its developers to be the largest and most modern office development in the country.

== Design and construction ==
The RCBC Plaza was designed by international architectural firm Skidmore, Owings & Merrill, LLP, in cooperation with local architectural firm W.V. Coscolluela & Associates. The structural design was provided by international engineering company Skilling Ward Magnusson Barkshire in cooperation with local engineering company R.S. Caparros Associates & Company. Project management services was provided by Bovis Lend Lease, while construction management works were provided by Pacific Orient Consultants & Management, Inc. The Main Contractor was ECW Joint Venture consisting of EEI Corporation (Philippines), Concrete Constructions (Australia) and Walter Bau (Germany). The superstructure construction works were self performed by ECW JV. EEI Corporation is also a part of the Yuchengco Group of Companies.

Besides these groups, other members of the design team include Ove Arup & Partners New York (Conceptual Services/Engineering/Transport & Traffic), DCCD Engineering Corp. (Electrical, Mechanical, Sanitary & Fire Protection Engineers); Davis Langdon & Seah (Quantity Surveyors); Hassell Ltd. (Landscape Consultants); ALT Cladding & Design (Cladding Consultants); Fisher Marantz Renfro Stone (Architectural and Theatre Lighting); and Shen Milsom & Wilke LLC . (Acoustical Consultants).

The external finishes of the buildings feature aluminum panels with fluorocarbon paint finish to towers, curtain wall of clear and solar reflective glass and stone cladding to podium.

== Location ==
RCBC Plaza stands on an island site bounded by thoroughfares in the Makati Central Business District such as Gil Puyat Avenue (Buendia) on the north, Ayala Avenue on the west, Geronimo Street on the east, and Salcedo Street on the south. Around its area are the Ayala North Exchange, educational institutions like the Asian Institute of Management, the Ateneo Graduate School of Business, Ateneo Law School, Mapua Institute of Technology Makati Campus, Centro Escolar University Makati Campus, CEU School of Law and Jurisprudence and the Far Eastern University Makati Campus - Business School. It is also a few blocks away from residential buildings like The Columns, Alphaland Makati Place, The Lerato, The Rise Makati, and SMDC Air Residences, plus the service facilities of the Makati Medical Center, Makati Central Post Office, and Makati Fire Station.

The RCBC Plaza is the home of Rizal Commercial Banking Corporation (RCBC), as well as the Yuchengco Institute for Advanced Studies (a partnership between RCBC and De La Salle University Professional Schools) and Yuchengco Museum.

It also houses the Carlos P. Romulo Auditorium, an auditorium with a capacity of 450 seats. It currently hosts the Repertory Philippines since 2024. The RCBC Plaza also hosts the embassies of Australia and Canada.

== Features and amenities ==
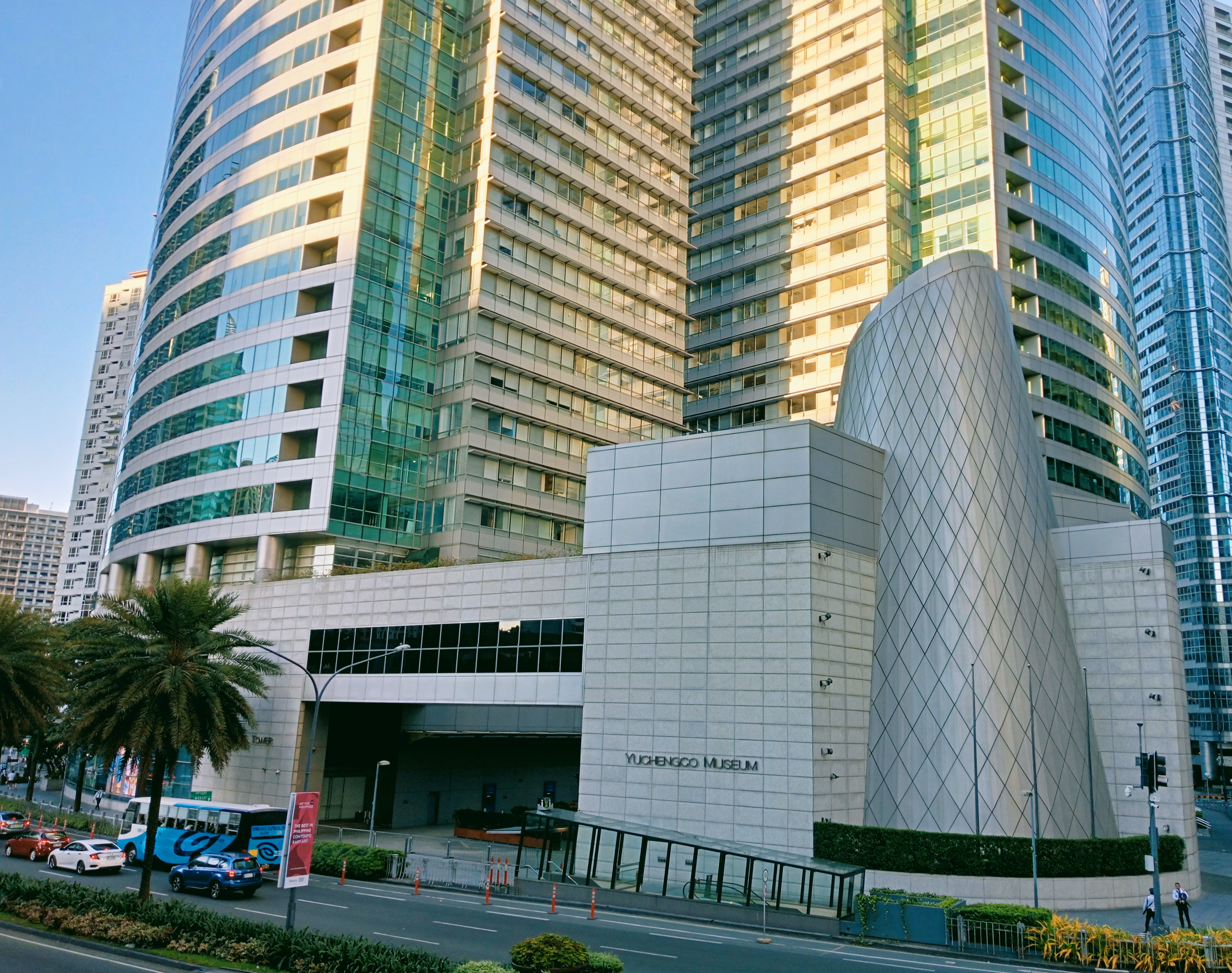
Yuchengco Museum at the building's base

The building complex features include perimeter located columns that offer a whole floor efficiency of 90% to 91%; floor-to-ceiling height of 2.75 meters (9 ft 0 in) with provision for raised flooring; external Curtain Wall System facade; provision for Executive Toilet; Fiber Optic Telecommunication Backbone carrying telephone, data, security and building management signals; Fire Protection System with sprinklers, smoke detectors and pressurized stairwells; designated High Loading Zone; 100% emergency back-up power System; State-of-the-art invisible security system; central chiller-type Air-conditioning System; and digitally controlled and monitored Building Automation System.

Amenities of the complex include banking chambers; convenience and specialty shops; gymnasium and health spa; food court restaurant; open-air courtyard; and a Roman Catholic chapel. Parking services are available at its 7-level basement that can accommodate up to 1,670 cars. De La Salle University also operates a satellite campus in RCBC Plaza, offering professional and graduate programs including its Masters in Business Administration program.

Since September 2023, the RCBC Plaza hosts the Embassy of Ireland in Manila.

== See also ==
- List of tallest buildings in Metro Manila
