= 2013 Box Office Entertainment Awards =

Annual Philippine entertainment awards

- Date: May 19, 2013
- Location: Manila

The 44th Guillermo Mendoza Memorial Scholarship Foundation Box Office Entertainment Awards (GMMSF-BOEA) is a part of the annual awards in the Philippines held on May 19, 2013. The award-giving body honors Filipino actors, actresses and other performers' commercial success, regardless of artistic merit, in the Philippine entertainment industry.

== Winners selection ==
The winners were chosen from the Top 10 Philippine films of 2012, top-rating shows in Philippine television, top recording awards received by singers, and top gross receipts of concerts and performances.

== Award ceremony ==
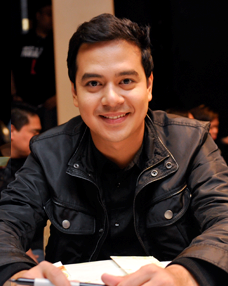
John Lloyd Cruz, Box Office King winner.

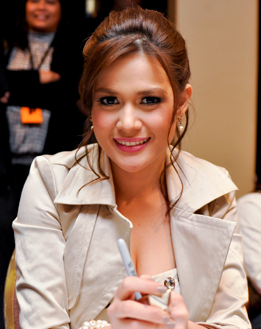
Bea Alonzo, Box Office Queen winner.

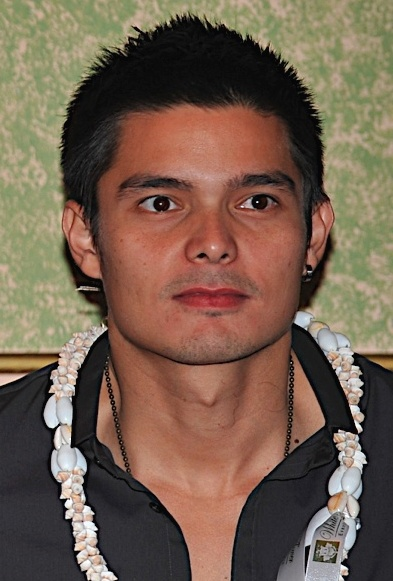
Dingdong Dantes, Film Actor of The Year winner.

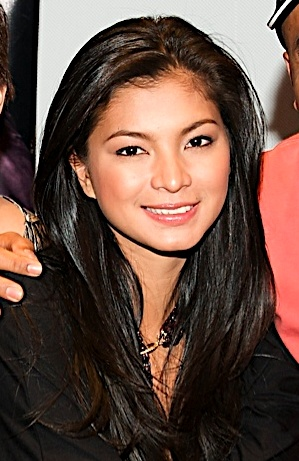
Angel Locsin Film Actress of The Year winner

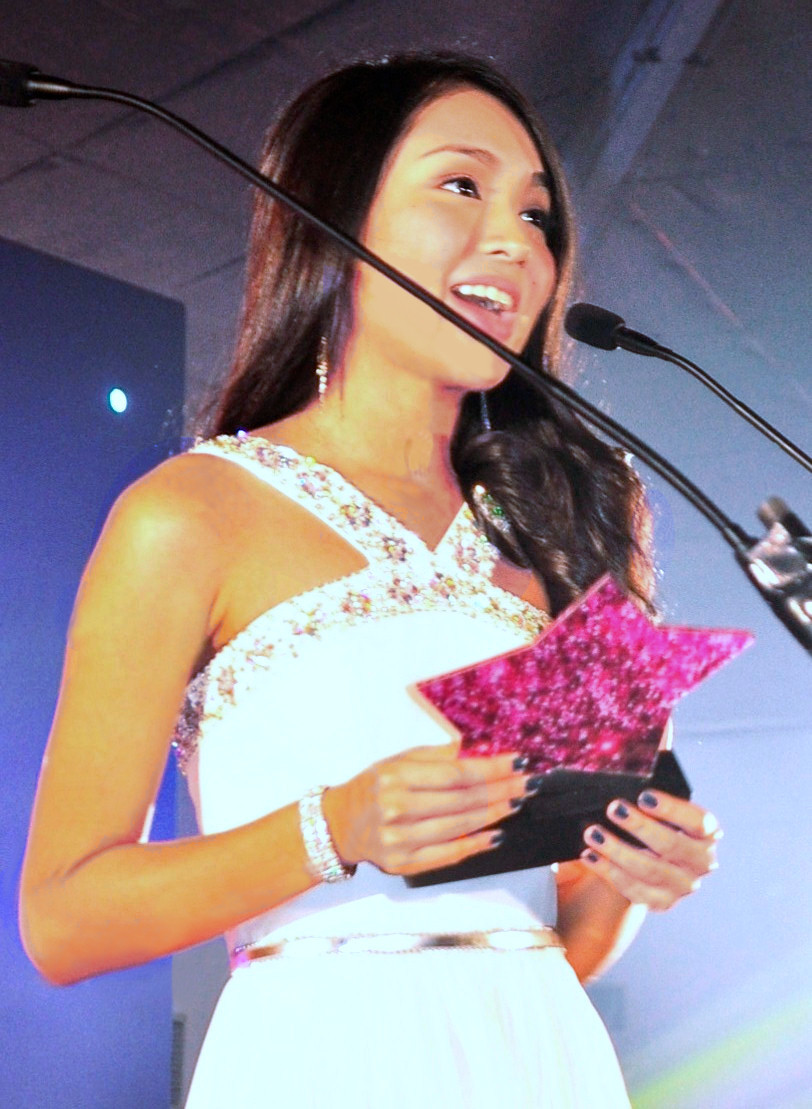
Kathryn Bernardo Most Promising Stars of the Year winners.

On May 19, 2013 at AFP Theatre in Camp Aguinaldo, Quezon City, Philippines, the 44th Box Office Entertainment Awards night was held. The awards night was organized by the Guillermo Mendoza Memorial Scholarship Foundation, Inc. (GMMSFI). The event aired a week later on May 26, as the "Sunday's Best" offering of ABS-CBN.

=== Awards ===
==== Major awards ====
- Phenomenal Box Office Stars – Kris Aquino, Vice Ganda, Ai Ai delas Alas (Sisterakas)
- Box Office King – John Lloyd Cruz (The Mistress)
- Box Office Queen – Bea Alonzo (The Mistress)
- Male Concert Performers of the Year – Jose Manalo and Wally Bayola
- Female Concert Performer of the Year – Anne Curtis
- Male Recording Artist of the Year – Christian Bautista
- Female Recording Artist of the Year – Aiza Seguerra

==== Film category ====
- Film Actor of the Year – Dingdong Dantes (One More Try)
- Film Actress of the Year – Angelica Panganiban, Angel Locsin (One More Try)
- Prince of Philippine Movies – Luis Manzano (This Guy's in Love with U Mare!)
- Princess of Philippine Movies – Toni Gonzaga (This Guy's in Love with U Mare!)
- Most Promising Male Star of the Year – Daniel Padilla
- Most Promising Female Star of the Year – Kathryn Bernardo
- Most Popular Film Producers – Star Cinema and Viva Films
- Most Popular Film Director – Wenn Deramas (Sisterakas)
- Most Popular Screenwriter – Olivia Lamasan and Vanessa Valdez (The Mistress)

==== Music category ====
- Promising Male Singer/Performer – Robin Nievera
- Promising Female Singer/Performer – Zia Quizon
- Most Popular Recording/Performing Group – Spongecola
- Most Promising Recording/Performing Group – Chicsers
- Most Popular Novelty Singers – Jose Manalo, Wally Bayola, Ryzza Mae Dizon

==== Television category ====
- Most Popular Love Team on Television – Richard Yap and Jodi Sta. Maria (ABS-CBN)
- All Time Favorite Love Team on Movies and TV – Richard Gomez and Dawn Zulueta (ABS-CBN)
- Prince of Philippine Television – Coco Martin (ABS-CBN)
- Princess of Philippine Television – Julia Montes (ABS-CBN)
- Most Promising Love Team – Daniel Padilla and Kathryn Bernardo (ABS-CBN)
- Most Popular Male Child Performer – Bugoy Cariño (ABS-CBN)
- Most Popular Female Child Performer – Ryzza Mae Dizon (GMA-7)
- Most Popular TV Program News & Public Affairs – 24 Oras (GMA-7)
- Most Popular Daytime TV Drama Series – Be Careful With My Heart (ABS-CBN)
- Most Popular Primetime TV Drama Series – Walang Hanggan (ABS-CBN)
- Most Popular TV Program Musical Variety – Eat Bulaga (GMA-7)
- Most Popular TV Program Talent Search/Reality – The X Factor Philippines (ABS-CBN)

=== Special award ===
- Bert Marcelo Lifetime Achievement Award – Noel Trinidad

== Multiple awards ==
=== Individuals with multiple awards ===
The following individual names received two or more awards:

Awards	Name
2	Jose Manalo
2	Wally Bayola
2	Ryzza Mae Dizon
2	Daniel Padilla
2	Kathryn Bernardo

=== Companies with multiple awards ===
The following companies received two or more awards in the television category:

Awards	Company
9	ABS-CBN
3	GMA-7
