= List of Philippine films of 2013 =

This is an incomplete list of Filipino full-length films, both mainstream and independently produced, released in theaters and cinemas in 2013.

== Highest-grossing films of 2013 ==
Rank	Film	Production outfit	Domestic gross^{1}	Source
1.	Girl, Boy, Bakla, Tomboy	Star Cinema, Viva Films	₱421 million	
2.	It Takes a Man and a Woman	Star Cinema, Viva Films	₱387 million	
3.	My Little Bossings	OctoArts Films, M-Zet Productions, APT Entertainment, K Productions	₱375.9 million	
4.	Pagpag: Siyam na Buhay	Star Cinema, Regal Films	₱188 million	
5.	Four Sisters and a Wedding	Star Cinema	₱145 million	
6.	She's the One	Star Cinema	₱137 million	
7.	Must Be... Love	Star Cinema	₱113 million	
8.	Bakit Hindi Ka Crush Ng Crush Mo?	Star Cinema	₱102.3 million	

Note

1. Box Office Mojo, a reliable third party box office revenue tracker, does not track any revenues earned during any Metro Manila Film Festival editions. So the official figures by film entries during the festival are only estimates taken from any recent updates from credible and reliable sources such as a film's production outfit, or from any news agencies. Also, Metropolitan Manila Development Authority (MMDA) did not release the official gross sales of each of the films. To verify the figures, see individual sources for the references.

Color key

- – a Metro Manila Film Festival entry film

== Films ==
More than a 100 full-length films were released in the Philippines, most of them were independently produced.

=== January–March ===
Opening		Title	Production company	Cast and crew	Genre	Source
J A N U A R Y	23	Menor de Edad	Viva Films	Joel Lamangan (director), Raquel Villavicencio (script and screenplay); Meg Imperial, Ara Mina, Wendell Ramos, Chynna Ortaleza, Jaycee Parker, and Almira Muhlach	Drama	
J A N U A R Y	30	Seduction	Regal Films	Peque Gallaga (director), and Aloy Adlawan (writer); Richard Gutierrez, Solenn Heussaff, Sarah Lahbati, Mark Gil, Jay Manalo, Yayo Aguila, and Al Tantay	Romance, drama	
F E B R U A R Y	6	I Love You, Pare Ko^{1}	Krix Film Productions	Neal Tan (director), Riqui Cardema (producer and script); Rocco Nacino, Rodjun Cruz, Arnell Ignacio, and Tita Swarding	Comedy, romance, drama	
F E B R U A R Y	6	Gabriel (Ito ang Kuwento Ko)^{1}	Sun Stars Films	Ronald M. Rafer (director); Joyce Ching, Marife Necesito, Lester Lucas, Joana Marie Tan, John Relucio, and Simon Ibarra	Drama	
F E B R U A R Y	13	A Moment in Time	Star Cinema, Dreamscape Cinema	Emmanuel Quindo Palo (director), Rondel Lindayag (screenplay); Julia Montes, Coco Martin, Cherie Gil, Gabby Concepcion, and Zsa Zsa Padilla	Romance, drama	
F E B R U A R Y	20	Gapang^{1}	Greendie Film Productions	Don Bautista (director); Miguel Alcantara, TJ Alonzo, Merwin Castro, and Jacob Diaz	Drama	
F E B R U A R Y	27	Alfredo S. Lim (The Untold Story)	CM Films	Cesar Montano (director and screenplay), Enrique Ramos (screenplay); Cesar Montano, Alessandra de Rossi, Nonie Buencamino, Marc Abaya, Alwyn Uytingco, Alvin Anson, Tirso Cruz III, Jackie Lou Blanco, Isabel Granada, Kristel Romero	Biopic, action, drama	
M A R C H	6	The Fighting Chefs	Rockets Productions, Viva Films	Ronnie Ricketts (director); Ronnie Ricketts, Arci Muñoz, Mark Gil, Boy Logro, Vandolph Quizon, Joross Gamboa, and Hero Angeles	Comedy, action, drama	
M A R C H	20	Pagari (Mohammad-Abdulahh)^{1}	Goldmine Entertainment Productions	Robby Tarroza (director), Bing Nellasca (producer); Arkin del Rosario, Teejay Marquez, Via Veloso, Rose Jordan, Inigo Cruz, Mel Martinez, Marlon Mance, and Fiona McKenzi	Drama	
M A R C H	30	It Takes a Man and a Woman	Star Cinema, Viva Films	Cathy Garcia-Molina (director), Carmi Raymundo (writer and screenplay); John Lloyd Cruz, Sarah Geronimo, Isabelle Daza, Rowell Santiago, Johnny Revilla, Bing Pimentel, Al Tantay, Irma Adlawan, Miles Ocampo, Andrei Garcia, Matet de Leon, Joross Gamboa, Gio Alvarez, and Guji Lorenzana	Romance, comedy, drama	

=== April–June ===
Opening		Title	Production company	Cast and crew	Genre	Source
A P R I L	10	Bad Romance^{1}	ArgonVision	Ian Del Carmen (director), Irvin Malcolm (screenplay); Janelle Manahan, Mercedes Cabral, Aiza Seguerra, Rey PJ Abellana, Archie Alemania, Jayson Gainza, Ogie Diaz, Raul Morit, Flor Salanga, Karen Gallman, and Francis Lopez	Romance, comedy, suspense, thriller	
A P R I L	17	Coming Soon	Fearless Productions, Brownsugar Entertainment	Martin Rey Aviles (director); Boy 2 Quizon, Andi Eigenmann, Glaiza de Castro, Dominic Roco, Carla Humphries, and Cholo Barretto	Comedy	
A P R I L	17	Bayang Magiliw^{1}	Teamwork Film Productions	Gil M. Portes (director), Enrique V. Ramos (writer); Wendell Ramos, Giselle Tongi, Arnold Reyes, Jackie Lou Blanco, Lloyd Samartino, Racquel Villavicencio, Althea Vega, Sue Prado, Princess Manzon, Rob Sy, Benjie Felipe, Tony Mabesa, Dax Alejandro, Jess Evardone, and Ellen Adarna	Political satire, comedy, drama	
M A Y	1	The Bride and the Lover	Regal Entertainment	Joel Lamangan (director); Lovi Poe, Jennylyn Mercado, Paulo Avelino, Alex Castro, Hayden Kho, Tim Yap, Joem Bascon, Arron Villaflor, Kat Alano, Carla Dunareanu, Cai Cortez, Carlo Gonzales, Ariel Ureta, Timmy Cruz, Buboy Garovillo, and Tom Rodriguez	Romance, drama	
M A Y	8	Leona Calderon^{1}	None	Jowee Morel (director and writer); Pilar Pilapil, Imelda de los Reyes, Junix Inocian, Greg Canestrari, and Irene Alano	Drama, romance, comedy	
M A Y	15	Bromance: My Brother's Romance^{1}	Skylight Films	Wenn V. Deramas (director); Zanjoe Marudo, Cristine Reyes, Abbie Bautista, Arlene Muhlach, Boom Labrusca, Manuel Chua, Joey Paras, Lassy Marquez, Nikki Valdez, and Joy Viado	Comedy	
J U N E	5	Juana C. the Movie	Laganap Productions	Jade Castro (director); Mae Paner, John James Uy, Niño Muhlach, Annicka Dolonius, Joel Torre, Ronnie Lazaro, Soxy Topacio, and Joel Lamangan	Political satire, comedy	
J U N E	12	Dance of the Steel Bars	GMA Films, Portfolio Films International	Cesar Apolinario (director), Marnie Manicad (director); Dingdong Dantes, Patrick Bergin, Joey Paras, Ricky Davao, Thou Reyes, and Mon Confiado	Drama, dance	
J U N E	19	Bangungot^{1}	ATG Entertainment Production	Jun Pereira (director); Empress Schuck, Joross Gamboa, Kiray Celis, Nikolai Andico, and Francis Lopez	Horror	
J U N E	19	Kapit sa Patalim^{1}	EFB Film Productions	Lao G. Mira (director); Melissa Mendez, Marvin Yap, Aldrico Padilla	Drama	
J U N E	26	Four Sisters and a Wedding	Star Cinema	Cathy Garcia-Molina (director); Angel Locsin, Toni Gonzaga, Bea Alonzo, Shaina Magdayao, Enchong Dee, Coney Reyes, Sam Milby, Angeline Quinto, Carmi Martin, Boboy Garovillo, Janus del Prado, and Bernard Palanca	Drama, comedy	

=== July–September ===
Color key

- – a Cinemalaya Philippine Independent Film Festival entry film
- – a Sineng Pambansa entry film
- – a CineFilipino entry film

Opening		Title	Production company	Cast and crew	Genre	Source
J U L Y	3	My Lady Boss	GMA Films, Regal Films	Jade Castro (director); Marian Rivera, Richard Gutierrez, Tom Rodriguez, Rocco Nacino, Matet de Leon, Benjie Paras, Maricel Laxa, Pinky Amador, Jackielou Blanco, Sandy Andolong, and Ronaldo Valdez	Romance, comedy, drama	
J U L Y	17	Tuhog^{1}	Skylight Films	Veronica Velasco (director); Eugene Domingo, Leo Martinez, Enchong Dee, Empress Schuck, Jake Cuenca, Manuel Chua, and Nikki Valdez	Dark comedy	
J U L Y	17	Boy Kabayo^{1}	Silverline Multimedia	G.A. Villafuerte (director); Marco Ronquillo, Kael Reyes, Lang Lopez, John Park, Ahvie Cojuangco, Paolo Salvatierra, Marion Barrera, and Yohan Villacorta	Adult, drama	
J U L Y	24	Daniel Rapido^{1}	RQC Production	Dyzal M. Damun (director); Fernando Caribio Jr., Iwa Moto, Roi Vinzon, Raiza Ruiz, Joel Ortega, Danny Labra, and Eddie Tuazon	Action, drama	
J U L Y	26	Ekstra: The Bit Player^{1}	Quantum Films	Jeffrey Jeturian (director), Zig Dulay (screenplay), Antoinette Jadaone (screenplay), Jeffrey Jeturian (screenplay); Vilma Santos, Marlon Rivera, Vincent de Jesus, Ruby Ruiz, and Tart Carlo	Comedy, drama	
J U L Y	26	Amor y Muerte^{1}	ATG Entertainment Production	Ces M. Evangelista (director); Althea Vega, Markki Stroem, Adrian Sebastian, Kuya Manzano, Amable Quiambao, Mico Palanca, RS Francisco, Moises Magisa, Lotlot Bustamante, and Chandy Rogel	Historic, drama	
J U L Y	26	Sana Dati^{1}	Metric Films	Jerrold Tarog (director), Ramon Ukit (screenplay); Paulo Avelino, Lovi Poe, Benjamin Alves, Ria Garcia, and TJ Trinidad	Romance, drama	
J U L Y	26	Porno^{1}	Phoenix Features, CMB Film Services Inc.	Adolfo B. Alix Jr. (director), Ralston Jover (screenplay); Angel Aquino, Carlo Aquino, Rosanna Roces, and Yul Servo	Drama	
J U L Y	26	Liars^{1}	Teamwork Film Productions	Gil M. Portes (director), Senedy Que (screenplay); Alessandra de Rossi, Jan Harley Hicana, John Michael Bonapos, Cris Villanueva, Richard Quan, Jim Rocky Tangco, Sue Prado, Dax Alejandro, and Arnold Reyes	Sports, drama	
J U L Y	27	Babagwa^{1}	Quantum Films, Kalalangan Kamaru	Jason Paul Laxamana (director); Alex Vincent Medina, Joey Paras, Alma Concepcion, Kiko Matos, Nico Antonio, Chanel Latorre, Marx Topacio, Raqs Regalado, Garry Lim, and Sunshine Teodoro	Drama	
J U L Y	27	David F.^{1}	Cinemalaya Foundation	Quester Hannah, Sid Lucero, Art Acuña, Rocky Salumbides, Mitch Valdez, Shamaine Buencamino, Anita Linda, and Eula Valdez	Historic, drama	
J U L Y	27	Debosyon^{1}	Voyage Studios	Alvin Yapan (director); Paulo Avelino, Mara Lopez, Ramona Rañeses, and Roy B. Dominguiano	Fantasy, drama	
J U L Y	27	Instant Mommy^{1}	K Productions, Quantum Films	Leo Abaya (director); Eugene Domingo, Yuki Matsuzaki, Luis Alandy, Rico J. Puno, Shamaine Buencamino, Tuesday Vargas, and Nicco Manalo	Comedy	
J U L Y	27	Nuwebe^{1}	One Big Fight Productions, Monoxide Works	Joseph Israel M. Laban (director); Barbara Miguel, Jake Cuenca, Nadine Samonte, Anita Linda, Manny Castañeda, Archie Adamos, Renaissance Tuason, Mikael Liwag, Isadora Villasquez, Renerich Ocon, Mariah Fernandez, Blair Arellano, and Derick Cabrido	Drama	
J U L Y	27	Purok 7^{1}	Cinemalaya Foundation	Carlo Obispo (director); Krystle Valentino, Miggs Cuaderno, Arnold Reyes, Angeli Bayani, Julian Trono, Carlon Matobato, and Sheenly Vee Gener	Drama, comedy	
J U L Y	27	Quick Change^{1}	Found Films	Eduardo Roy Jr. (director and screenplay); Mimi Juareza, Jun-Jun Quitana, Miggs Cuaderno, Francine Garcia, Natashia Yumi, Filipe Martinez, Rolando Inocencio, and Sashi Giggle	Drama	
J U L Y	27	Rekorder^{1}	Filmex, PelikulaRed	Mikhail Red (director and screenplay), Ian Victoriano (screenplay); Ronnie Quizon, Mike Lloren, Buboy Villar, Earl Ignacio, Suzette Ranillo, Belinda Mariano, Lowell Conales, Joe Gruta, Archie Adamos, and Abe Pagtama	Drama	
J U L Y	27	The Diplomat Hotel^{1}	Quantum Films	Christopher Ad Castillo (director); Gretchen Barretto, Art Acuña, Mon Confiado, Joel Torre, and Nico Antonio	Horror, drama	
J U L Y	27	Transit^{1}	Ten17P	Hannah Espia (director); Jasmine Curtis Smith, Ping Medina, Irma Adlawan, Mercedes Cabral, and Marc Justine Alvarez	Drama	
J U L Y	31	Bakit Hindi Ka Crush Ng Crush Mo?	Star Cinema	Joyce Bernal (director); Kim Chiu, Xian Lim, Ramon Bautista, Kean Cipriano, Mylene Dizon, Freddie Webb, Tonton Gutierrez, and EJ Jallorina	Comedy, romance, drama	
A U G U S T	7	Raketeros	Heaven's Best Entertainment, Star Cinema	Randy Santiago (director); Herbert Bautista, Dennis Padilla, Long Mejia, Andrew E., Ogie Alcasid, Joey Marquez, Mark Gil, Sam Pinto, Ryan Bang, Wendy Valdez, and RR Enriquez	Comedy	
A U G U S T	14	Ang Mundo sa Panahon ng Bakal^{1}	Sampaybakod Productions, Cinelarga	Mes De Guzman (director, writer); Jess Evardone, Japo Escobedo, Abdul John Candelario, Japo Escobedo, and Abdul John Candelario	Drama	
A U G U S T	21	Ang Huling Henya	Viva Films, MVP Pictures, Simple Truth Productions	Marlon Rivera (director); Rufa Mae Quinto, Edgar Allan Guzman, Candy Pangilinan, Ayen Laurel, DJ Durano, Robert Seña, Kean Cipriano, and Ricci Chan	Apocalyptic, comedy, sci-fi, action	
A U G U S T	28	On the Job	Star Cinema, Reality Entertainment	Erik Matti (director and writer), Michiko Yamamoto (writer); Piolo Pascual, Gerald Anderson, Joel Torre, Joey Marquez, Michael de Mesa, Leo Martinez, Angel Aquino, Vivian Velez, Shaina Magdayao, William Martinez, Rayver Cruz, and Empress Schuck	Action, crime, thriller, drama	
S E P T E M B E R	4	Talamak	Renaissance Entertainment	Arturo San Agustin (director); Lovi Poe, Felix Roco, Jaclyn Jose, Roi Vinzon, Jeffrey Santos, Aleck Bovick, Sunshine Garcia, and Rez Cortez	Drama	
S E P T E M B E R	11	Sonata^{1}^{,} ^{3}	Ruby's Arms	Peque Gallaga (director), Lore Reyes (director); Cherie Gil, Chart Motus, Joshua Pineda, Chino Jalandoni, Madeleine Gallaga, Dante Amaguin, Angel Lobaton, Tanya Lopez, and Richard Gomez	Drama	
S E P T E M B E R	11	Lihis^{1}^{,} ^{3}	BG Productions International	Joel Lamangan (director), Ricky Lee (writer); Jake Cuenca, Joem Bascon, Isabelle Daza, Lovi Poe, Gloria Diaz, Raquel Villavicencio, Jaime Pebanco, Tony Mabesa, and Lloyd Samartino	Historical, drama	
S E P T E M B E R	11	Lauriana^{1}^{,} ^{3}	BG Productions International	Mel Chionglo (director), Ricardo Lee (screenplay); Bangs Garcia, Allen Dizon, Victor Basa, Adrian Cabido, J.C. Parker, Rich Asuncion, and Anna Luna	Drama	
S E P T E M B E R	11	Ano ang Kulay ng mga Nakalimutang Pangarap?^{1}^{,} ^{3}	Largarista Entertainment	Joey Reyes (director); Rustica Carpio, Angel Aquino, Ryan Agoncillo, and Bobby Andrews	Drama	
S E P T E M B E R	11	Bamboo Flowers^{1}^{,} ^{3}	Productions 56	Maryo J. De Los Reyes (director); Ruru Madrid, Mylene Dizon, Max Collins, Yogo Singh, Orlando Sol, Irma Adlawan, Spanky Manikan, and Diva Montelaba	Drama	
S E P T E M B E R	11	Tag-araw ni Twinkle^{1}^{,} ^{3}	Teamwork Productions	Gil M. Portes (director); Ellen Adarna, Dominic Roco, Rina Reyes, Pinky Amador, Marc Aqueza, Annica Dolonius, Benjie Felipe, Jess Evardone and Lester Llansang	Drama	
S E P T E M B E R	11	Otso^{1}^{,} ^{3}	Philippine Stagers Foundation	Elwood Perez (director); Vince Tañada, Vangie Labalan, Jordan Ladra, Cindy Liper, Gabby Bautista, Chris Lim, Kevin Posadas, Art Gabrentina, Cherry Bagtas, Patrick Libao, Jun Urbano, and Anita Linda	Political, drama	
S E P T E M B E R	13	Badil^{1}^{,} ^{3}	Waray Republik	Chito S. Roño (director), Rody Vera (writer); Jhong Hilario, Dick Israel, Nikki Gil, Yayo Aguila, Mercedes Cabral, and Ronnie Quizon	Political, thriller, drama	
S E P T E M B E R	14	Tinik^{1}^{,} ^{3}	Red Sun Production	Romy Suzara (director), Raymond Diamzon (screenplay), Emmanuel H. Borlaza (screenplay); Ricardo Cepeda, Lemuel Pelayo, Alexis Navarro, Bembol Roco, Lance Raymundo, Angeli Bayani, and Menggie Cobarrubias	Drama	
S E P T E M B E R	14	Bahay ng Lagim^{1}^{,} ^{3}	Film Development Council of the Philippines	Celso Ad. Castillo (director); Victoria Haynes, Jaclyn Jose, Ronnie Lazaro, Bing Loyzaga, Karel Marquez, and Lovely Rivero	Drama	
S E P T E M B E R	18	Momzillas	Star Cinema, Viva Films	Wenn V. Deramas (director); Maricel Soriano, Eugene Domingo, Billy Crawford, Andi Eigenmann, Joey Paras, Candy Pangilinan, Divina Valencia, Luz Valdez, and Mel Martinez	Comedy	
S E P T E M B E R	18	Ang Kwento Ni Mabuti^{1}	CineFilipino, Cinelarga, Sampaybakod Productions	Mes De Guzman (director); Nora Aunor, Ama Quiambao, Arnold Reyes, Sue Prado, Mara Lopez, Josefina Estabillo, and Trinity Aragon	Drama	
S E P T E M B E R	18	Ang Huling Cha-Cha ni Anita^{1}	CineFilipino, Pixeleyes Multimedia, Ekweytormc	Sigrid Andrea Bernardo (director), Diwa de Leon (music); Teri Malvar, Len-Len Frial, Solomon de Guzman, Angel Aquino, Lui Manansala, Marcus Madrigal	Drama	
S E P T E M B E R	18	Ang Pabo Man ay Turkey Rin^{1}	CineFilipino	Randolph Longjas (director), Ronald Allan Habon (writer); Tuesday Vargas, Travis Kraft, JM De Guzman, Julia Clarete, Cai Cortez,	Comedy	
S E P T E M B E R	18	Puti^{1}	CineFilipino	Mike Alcazaren (director); Ian Veneracion, Jasmine Curtis, Lauren Young, Bryan Pagala, and Leo Rialp	Psychological thriller, drama	
S E P T E M B E R	18	Mga Alaala ng Tag-ulan^{1}	CineFilipino	Ato Bautista (director); Akihiro Blanco, Mocha Uson, Issa Litton, Lance Raymundo Pio Balbuena, and Mon Confiado	Drama	
S E P T E M B E R	18	Bingoleras^{1}	CineFilipino	Ron Bryant (director); Eula Valdez, Charee Pineda, Lisa Dino, Mercedes Cabral, Hazel Orencio, Max Eigenmann, Lou Veloso, Art Acuña, Cita Astals, Junjun Quintana, Angie Ferro, Angelina Kanapi, Ieth Inolino, Paolo Cabanero, Kiko Matos, and Ian Lomongo	Comedy	
S E P T E M B E R	18	The Guerrilla is a Poet^{1}	CineFilipino, Kino Arts	Kiri Dalena (director), Sari Raissa Lluch Dalena (director); Anthony Falcon, Bong Cabrera, R.K. Bagatsing, Chanel Latorre, Lehner Mendoza	Historical, docudrama	
S E P T E M B E R	18	The Muses^{1}	CineFilipino	Janice Perez (director); Kitchie Nadal, Marvene Rom Munda, Janelle Jamer, Chicoy Romualdez	Drama	

=== October–December ===
Color key

- – a QCinema International Film Festival entry film
- – a Cinema One Originals Film Festival entry film
- – a MMFF New Wave Category entry film
- – a Cinemanila International Film Festival–Digital Lokal entry film
- – a Metro Manila Film Festival entry film

Opening		Title	Production company	Cast and crew	Genre	Source
O C T O B E R	2	Kung Fu Divas	Reality Entertainment, The O&Co. Picture Factory	Onat Diaz (director, writer, screenplay); Ai Ai delas Alas, Marian Rivera, Roderick Paulate, Gloria Diaz, Edward Mendez, Nova Villa, Ruffa Gutierrez, Martin Escudero, Roy Alvarez, Precious Lara Quigaman, and Bianca Manalo	Fantasy, comedy, action	
O C T O B E R	3	Gaydar^{1}	Vim Yapan-Alem Chua Productions, Quantum Films	Alvin Yapan (director, writer), Alemberg Ang (producer); Pauleen Luna, Tom Rodriguez, Rafael Rosell, Benedict Campos, Johnron Tañada, Olive Nieto, and Dennis Marasigan	Comedy	
O C T O B E R	3	Hello, World^{1}	Punch Kick	Joel Ferrer (director); Victor Medina, Reuben Uy, Trixie Dauz, Cesca Lee, Pen Medina, Regine Palma, and Philippe Quintos	Comedy	
O C T O B E R	3	Lucas Nino^{1}	Peliculas Los Otros	John Torres (director); Cheeno Dalog Ladera, and Edilberto Marcelino	Drama	
O C T O B E R	9	Metro Manila	Chocolate Frog Films	Sean Ellis (director); Jake Macapagal, Althea Vega, John Arcilla	Crime, drama	
O C T O B E R	16	She's the One	Star Cinema	Mae Cruz (director), Vanessa Valdez (writer); Bea Alonzo, Dingdong Dantes, Enrique Gil, Maricar Reyes, Liza Soberano, Perla Bautista, Pinky Amador, Tony Mabesa, RS Francisco, Guji Lorenzana, Coleen Garcia, Daniel Matsunaga, LJ Reyes, and Erika Padilla	Comedy, romance, drama	
O C T O B E R	23	Bekikang	Viva Films	Wenn V. Deramas (director); Joey Paras, Tom Rodriguez, JM Ibañez, Tirso Cruz III, Carla Humphries, Janice de Belen, Atak Araña, Lassy Marquez, and Nikki Valdez	Comedy, drama	
N O V E M B E R	6	Status: It's Complicated	Regal Films	Chris Martinez (director, writer), Jose Carreon (screenplay); Eugene Domingo, Jake Cuenca, Paulo Avelino, Solenn Heussaff, Maja Salvador, Clarence Delgado, Beatriz Saw, RR Enriquez, Lovi Poe, Marx Topacio, and Madz Nicolas	Comedy	
N O V E M B E R	6	Sapi	Centerstage Productions, Solar Entertainment	Brillante Mendoza (director), Henry Burgos (screenplay); Baron Geisler, Meryll Soriano, and Dennis Trillo	Horror	
N O V E M B E R	12	Kabisera^{1}	Reality Entertainment	Borgy Torre (director), Vicente Garcia Groyon (writer); Joel Torre, Arthur Acuña, Ketchup Eusebio, Bernard Palanca, Bing Pimentel, and Meryll Soriano	Action, thriller	
N O V E M B E R	12	Woman of the Ruins^{1}	Kino Arts	Alessandra de Rossi, Arthur Acuña, Chanel Latorre, Elizabeth Oropesa, Peque Gallaga, Joe Gruta, and Moises Magisa	Drama	
N O V E M B E R	12	Philippino Story^{1}	None	Benji Garcia (director, writer, screenplay); Mark Gil, Jun Jun Quintana, Nor Domingo, Kimmy Maclang, and Rolando Inocencio	Drama	
N O V E M B E R	12	Shift^{1}	Outpost Visual Frontier	Siege Ledesma (director, writer); Yeng Constantino, Felix Roco, Matthew Valeña, Alex Medina,	Romance, drama	
N O V E M B E R	12	Alamat ni China Doll^{1}	Phoenix Features	Angelica Panganiban, Phillip Salvador, Cesar Montano, Anita Linda, Allan Paule, Carlo Aquino, Evelyn Vargas, Cherry Pie Picache, and Yul Servo	Drama	
N O V E M B E R	12	Saturday Night Chills^{1}	None	Ian Loreños (director); David Chua, Rayver Cruz, Matteo Guidicelli, and Joseph Marco	Drama	
N O V E M B E R	12	Bendor^{1}	Epicmedia, Bigtop Media Productions	Ralston Jover (director), Marizaly J. Quitania (writer); Vivian Velez, Evelyn Vargas, Simon Ibarra, Sue Prado, and Lester Llansang	Drama	
N O V E M B E R	12	Angustia^{1}	Cine Rinconada	Khristian Cordero (director, writer); Alex Medina, Maria Isabel Lopez, Jazmin Llana, Victor Loquias, Michelle Smith, and Frank Peñones Jr.	Drama	
N O V E M B E R	12	Islands^{1}	FFF, Outpost Visual Frontier	Whammy Alcazaren (director, writer, screenplay); Luis Alandy, Benjamin Alves, Meryll Soriano, Peque Gallaga, Irma Adlawan, and Marita Zobel	Science fiction, drama	
N O V E M B E R	12	Bukas na Lang Sapagkat Gabi Na^{1}	Barong Tagalog, Hubert Bals Fund	Jet Leyco (director, writer), Norman Wilwayco (writer); Raul Morit, Lemuel Silvestre, Maria Veronica Santiago, Jack Yabut, Dan De Guzman, and Hector Macaso	Drama	
N O V E M B E R	12	Riddles of My Homecoming^{1}	BordWerkz Productions, Hyde Out Entertainment	Arnel Mardoquio (director, writer); Fe GingGing Hyde, Perry Dizon, Madz Garcia, Jeff Sabayle, and Jillian Khayle Barbarona	Drama	
N O V E M B E R	12	Blue Bustamante^{1}	Creative Programs, Punch Kick	Miko Livelo (director, writer), John Elbert Ferrer (writer); Joem Bascon, Dimples Romana, Jhiz Deocareza, Gerard Go, Hirohisa Nakamura, Jun Sabayton, and Mari Koduka	Comedy	
N O V E M B E R	12	Iskalawags^{1}	Deligero & Co.	Keith Deligero (director, writer, screenplay); Gale Osorio (writer, screenplay); Kerwin Otida, Reynaldo Formentera, Windel Otida, Johnreil Lunzaga, Joriel Lunzaga, and Micko Maurillo	Drama	
N O V E M B E R	12	Pagbabalat ng Ahas^{1}	None	Timmy Harn (director, writer), Pamela Miras (writer); Mervyn Brondial, Kay Conlu-Brondial, Karl Sebastian Sanchez, Roxlee, and Charles Aaron Salazar	Drama	
N O V E M B E R	12	Sitio^{1}	Cinelarga, Colorista	Mes De Guzman (director, writer); John Prats, Ria Garcia, Arnold Reyes, R.K. Bagatsing, Anja Aguilar, and Biboy Ramirez	Drama	
N O V E M B E R	27	When the Love Is Gone	Viva Films, Multivision Pictures	Andoy Ranay (director), Keiko Aquino (writer, screenplay); Cristine Reyes, Gabby Concepcion, Alice Dixson, Andi Eigenmann, and Jake Cuenca	Romance, drama	
N O V E M B E R	27	Call Center Girl	Star Cinema, Skylight Films	Don Cuaresma (director); Pokwang, Enchong Dee, Jessy Mendiola, John Lapus, Ejay Falcon, K Brosas, Chokoleit, Arron Villaflor, Ogie Diaz, Alex Castro, Dianne Medina, and Natasha Cabrera	Comedy, drama	
D E C E M B E R	11	Morgue	Digimar Films	Joven Tan (director); Mark Herras, Bugoy Cariño, Rich Asuncion, J.C. Parker, Anita Linda, Ronnie Lazaro, and Robert Villar	Horror, drama	
D E C E M B E R	18	Ang Misis ni Meyor	Eightfold Path Cinema	Archie Del Mundo (director); Marife Necesito, Angie Ferro, Marco Morales, Joem Bascon, Miles Canapi, Maria Isabel Lopez, and Julio Diaz	Drama	
D E C E M B E R	18	Ang Maestra^{1}	Pixel Works Enterprise, Scenema Concept International	Joven Tan (director, writer); Perla Bautista, Vaness del Moral, Jenine Desiderio, Dexter Doria, Mel Kimura, and Lui Manansala	Drama	
D E C E M B E R	18	Dukit^{1}	Center Stage Productions	Armando Lao (director), Honie Alipio (writer); Willy Layug, Raquel Villavicencio, Bor Ocampo, Bambalito Lacap, Thea Lelay, Rhea Lim, Mark Joseph Griswold, and Grace Martinez	Drama	
D E C E M B E R	18	Saka-Saka^{1}	Cinebro	Toto Natividad (director); Ejay Falcon, Joseph Marco, Toby Alejar, Mon Confiado, Baron Geisler, and Gigi Locsin	Action, drama	
D E C E M B E R	18	Island Dreams^{1}	Kenau Pictures Production	Aloy Adlawan (director), Gino M. Santos (director), Aloy Adlawan (writer); Louise delos Reyes, Alexis Petitprez, Irma Adlawan, Chanel Latorre, Natasha Villaroman, Hector Macaso, Junar Vidal, and Ronaldo Baxafra	Romance, comedy	
D E C E M B E R	18	Mga Anino ng Kahapon^{1}	Vim Yapan-Alem Chua Productions	Alvin Yapan (director, writer); Agot Isidro, TJ Trinidad, Carlo Cruz, Carl Acosta, and Upeng Galang-Fernandez	Drama	
D E C E M B E R	21	How to Disappear Completely^{1}	Cinematografica, Hubert Bals Fund	Shamaine Buencamino, Noni Buencamino, Ness Roque, Ronnie Martinez, and Abner Delina	Horror	
D E C E M B E R	21	Boogie^{1}	None	Rommel Tolentino (director)	Drama	
D E C E M B E R	25	Girl, Boy, Bakla, Tomboy	Star Cinema, Viva Films	Wenn V. Deramas (director), Alyz Henrich (screenplay); Vice Ganda, Maricel Soriano, Joey Marquez, Ruffa Gutierrez, Cristine Reyes, JC De Vera, Ejay Falcon, Kiray Celis, and Xyriel Manabat	Comedy	
D E C E M B E R	25	My Little Bossings	OctoArts Films, M-Zet Productions, APT Entertainment, K Productions	Marlon Rivera (director), Bibeth Orteza (screenplay); Vic Sotto, Kris Aquino, Ryzza Mae Dizon, Bimby Aquino-Yap, Jaclyn Jose, Aiza Seguerra, Jose Manalo, Paolo Ballesteros, and Barbie Forteza	Comedy	
D E C E M B E R	25	Kimmy Dora: Ang Kiyemeng Prequel	Spring Films, MJM Productions, Quantum Films	Chris Martinez (director, writer); Eugene Domingo, Sam Milby, Ariel Ureta, Miriam Quiambao, Moi Bien, Mura, Joel Torre, Angel Aquino, Kiray Celis, Dawn Zulueta, Lovi Poe, and Benjamin Alves	Comedy, action	
D E C E M B E R	25	Pagpag: Siyam na Buhay	Star Cinema, Regal Films	Frasco S. Mortiz (director), Joel Mercado (writer, screenplay); Kathryn Bernardo, Daniel Padilla, Shaina Magdayao, Paulo Avelino, Clarence Delgado, Matet de Leon, Janus del Prado, Miles Ocampo, CJ Navato Michelle Vito, Dominic Roque, Dominic Ochoa, and Manuel Chua	Horror, drama	
D E C E M B E R	25	10,000 Hours	Philippine Film Studios Inc.	Joyce Bernal (director), Ryllah Epifania Berico (writer), Keiko Aquino (writer); Robin Padilla, Bela Padilla, Pen Medina, Joem Bascon, Michael de Mesa, Mylene Dizon, Alden Richards, and Carla Humphries	Action, drama	
D E C E M B E R	25	Pedro Calungsod: Batang Martir	Wings Entertainment	Francis O. Villacorta (producer, writer, director); Rocco Nacino, Christian Vasquez, Jestoni Alarcon, Ryan Eigenmann, Robert Correa, Victor Basa, Carlo Gonzales, Andrew Schimmer, Arthur Solinap, and Mico Palanca	Biographical, drama	
D E C E M B E R	25	Boy Golden: Shoot to Kill, the Arturo Porcuna Story	Scenema Concept International, Viva Films	Chito S. Roño (director), Catherine O. Camarillo (screenplay), Guelan Varela-Luarca (screenplay); Jeorge Estregan, KC Concepcion, Joem Bascon, John Estrada, Tony Razon, Tonton Gutierrez, Leo Martinez, Gloria Sevilla, Eddie Garcia, Jhong Hilario, Baron Geisler, Roi Vinzon, and John Lapus	Action, drama	
D E C E M B E R	25	Kaleidoscope World	iAct Productions	Liza Cornejo (director); Sef Cadayona, Yassi Pressman, Mayton Eugenio, Alma Concepcion, Alireza Libre, Pilar Pilapil, Arnold Reyes, Brylle Mondejar, and William Angeles	Dance, drama	

Notes

1. ^ ^{a} ^{b} ^{c} ^{d} ^{e} ^{f} ^{g} ^{h} ^{i} ^{j} ^{k} ^{l} ^{m} ^{n} ^{o} ^{p} ^{q} ^{r} ^{s} ^{t} ^{u} ^{v} ^{ww} ^{x} ^{y} ^{z} ^{aa} ^{bb} ^{cc} ^{dd} ^{ee} ^{ff} ^{gg} ^{hh} ^{ii} ^{jj} ^{kk} ^{ll} ^{mm} ^{nn} ^{oo} ^{pp} ^{qq} ^{rr} ^{ss} ^{tt} ^{uu} ^{vv} ^{ww} ^{xx} ^{yy} ^{zz} ^{aaa} ^{bbb} ^{ccc} ^{ddd} ^{eee} ^{fff} ^{ggg} ^{hhh} ^{iii} ^{jjj} ^{kkk} ^{lll} ^{mmm} ^{nnn} ^{ooo} ^{ppp} ^{qqq} ^{rrr} Film is an independently produced film.
2. ^ ^{a} ^{b} July 26 is Ekstra: The Bit Player's festival screening. August 14 is the film's commercial release nationwide.
3. ^ ^{a} ^{b} ^{c} ^{d} ^{e} ^{f} ^{g} ^{h} ^{i} ^{j} All ten Sineng Pambansa films had an extended run from October 11 until October 17, 2013. Previously, the ten films were screened from September 11 to September 17, 2013.

== Awards ==
=== Local ===
The following first list shows the Best Picture winners at the four major film awards: FAMAS Awards, Gawad Urian Awards, Luna Awards and Star Awards; and at the three major film festivals: Metro Manila Film Festival, Cinemalaya and Cinema One Originals. The second list shows films with the most awards won from the three major film awards and a breakdown of their total number of awards per award ceremony.

Award/festival	Best Picture		Ref.
62nd FAMAS Awards	On the Job		
37th Gawad Urian Awards	Norte, Hangganan ng Kasaysayan		
32nd Luna Awards	Was not held		
30th Star Awards for Movies	Badil	On the Job	
24th Young Critics Circle Citations	Porno		
39th Metro Manila Film Festival	10,000 Hours	Dukit	
9th Cinemalaya Independent Film Festival	Sana Dati	Transit	
9th Cinema One Originals Film Festival	Alamat ni China Doll	Bukas na Lang Sapagkat Gabi Na	

Film	Total	FAMAS	Urian	Star
On the Job	15	6	2	7
Boy Golden: Shoot to Kill	9	6	0	3
Norte, Hangganan ng Kasaysayan	4	0	4	0
Sonata	4	0	1	3
Badil	3	0	0	3

=== International ===
The following list shows Filipino films (released in 2013) which were nominated or won awards at international industry-based awards.

Award	Category	Nominee	Result	Ref.
30th Independent Spirit Awards	Best International Film	Norte, Hangganan ng Kasaysayan (Norte, the End of History)	Nominated	
2nd ASEAN International Film Festival and Awards	Best Film	Bendor	Nominated	
2nd ASEAN International Film Festival and Awards	Best Film	Nuwebe	Nominated	
2nd ASEAN International Film Festival and Awards	Best Director	Joseph Israel Laban, Nuwebe	Won	
2nd ASEAN International Film Festival and Awards	Best Director	Ralston Jover, Bendor	Nominated	
2nd ASEAN International Film Festival and Awards	Best Director	Carlo Obispo, Purok 7	Nominated	
2nd ASEAN International Film Festival and Awards	Best Actress	Cherie Gil, Sonata	Won	
2nd ASEAN International Film Festival and Awards	Best Actress	Vivian Velez, Bendor	Nominated	
2nd ASEAN International Film Festival and Awards	Best Actress	Barbara Miguel, Nuwebe	Nominated	
2nd ASEAN International Film Festival and Awards	Best Actress	Krystle Valentino, Purok 7	Nominated	
2nd ASEAN International Film Festival and Awards	Best Supporting Actress	Anna Luna, Bendor	Nominated	
2nd ASEAN International Film Festival and Awards	Best Screenplay	Ralston Jover & Marizaly Quitania, Bendor	Nominated	
2nd ASEAN International Film Festival and Awards	Best Screenplay	Wanggo Gallaga, Sonata	Nominated	
2nd ASEAN International Film Festival and Awards	Best Film Photography	Mark Gary, Sonata	Nominated	
2nd ASEAN International Film Festival and Awards	Best Film Editing	Benjamin Gonzales Tolentino, Bendor	Won	
2nd ASEAN International Film Festival and Awards	Best Film Editing	Thop Nazareno, Purok 7	Nominated	
2nd ASEAN International Film Festival and Awards	ASEAN Spirit Award	Purok 7	Won	

== See also ==
- 2013 in the Philippines
- List of 2013 box office number-one films in the Philippines
