= 2014 FAMAS Awards =

Annual Filipino film awards ceremony

62nd FAMAS Awards
- Date: July 13, 2014
- Site: Solaire Resort and Casino, Parañaque

Highlights
- Best Picture: On the Job

The 62nd Filipino Academy of Movie Arts and Sciences Awards Night was held at the Solaire Resort and Casino in Parañaque on July 13, 2014. KC Concepcion won Best Actress and ER Ejercito won Best Actor. Erik Matti won Best Director for his film On the Job as well as Best Picture.

== Awards ==
=== Major Awards ===
Winners are listed first and highlighted with boldface.

Best Picture	Best Director
**On the Job — Reality Entertainment and Star Cinema**; 10,000 Hours — Philippine Film Studios, Viva Films and N2 Productions; Boy Golden: Shoot to Kill, the Arturo Porcuna Story — Scenema Concept International, Inc. and Viva Films; Burgos — Heaven's Best Entertainment; Ekstra — Cinemalaya Foundation and Quantum Films; Four Sisters and A Wedding — Star Cinema; Lauriana — Film Development Council of the Philippines and BG Productions International; Pagpag: Siyam na Buhay — Star Cinema and Regal Films	**Erik Matti — On the Job**; Joyce E. Bernal — 10,000 Hours; Mel Chionglo — Lauriana; Jeffrey Jeturian — Ekstra; Joel Lamangan — Burgos; Cathy Garcia-Molina — Four Sisters and A Wedding; Frasco Mortiz — Pagpag: Siyam na Buhay; Chito Roño — Boy Golden: Shoot to Kill, the Arturo Porcuna Story
Best Actor	Best Actress
**Jeorge Estregan — Boy Golden: Shoot to Kill, the Arturo Porcuna Story as Arturo "Boy Golden" Porcuna**; Gerald Anderson — On the Job as Daniel Benitez; John Lloyd Cruz — It Takes A Man And A Woman as Miguel "Miggy" Montenegro; Dingdong Dantes — She's the One as Wacky; Xian Lim — Bakit Hindi Ka Crush ng Crush Mo? as Alex Prieto; Coco Martin — A Moment in Time as Patrick Javier; Daniel Padilla — Pagpag: Siyam na Buhay as Cedric; Robin Padilla — 10,000 Hours as Gabriel Molino Alcaraz; Piolo Pascual — On the Job as Atty. Francis Coronel, Jr; Vic Sotto — My Little Bossings as Victor "Torky" Villanueva	**KC Concepcion — Boy Golden: Shoot to Kill, the Arturo Porcuna Story as Marla "Marla Dy" De Guzman**; Bea Alonzo — Four Sisters and A Wedding as Roberta Olivia "Bobbie" Salazar; Sarah Geronimo — It Takes A Man And A Woman as Adelaida "Laida" Magtalas; Toni Gonzaga — Four Sisters and A Wedding as Theodora Grace "Teddie" Salazar; Kim Chiu — Bakit Hindi Ka Crush ng Crush Mo? as Sandy Veloso; Angel Locsin — Four Sisters and A Wedding as Alexandra Camille "Alex" Salazar; Kathryn Bernardo — Pagpag: Siyam na Buhay as Leni; Marian Rivera — Kung Fu Divas as Samantha / Mena; Julia Montes — A Moment in Time as Jillian Linden; Lorna Tolentino — Burgos as Editha Burgos
Best Supporting Actor	Best Supporting Actress
**Pen Medina — 10,000 Hours as Sebastian Jago**; John Estrada — Boy Golden: Shoot to Kill, the Arturo Porcuna Story as Tony Razon; Baron Geisler — Boy Golden: Shoot to Kill, the Arturo Porcuna Story as Datu Putla; Enrique Gil — She's the One as David; Joey Marquez — On the Job as Sgt. Joaquin Acosta; Joel Torre — On the Job as Mario "Tatang" Maghari	**Bela Padilla — 10,000 Hours as Maya Limchauco**; Coney Reyes — Four Sisters and A Wedding as Grace Salazar; Gloria Sevilla — Boy Golden: Shoot to Kill, the Arturo Porcuna Story as Aling Puring; Angel Aquino — On the Job as Lulette; Aiza Seguerra — My Little Bossings as Ice; Cherie Gil — A Moment in Time as Karen Linden
Best Child Performer	Best Screenplay
**Adrian Cabido — Lauriana as Carding**; Clarence Delgado — Pagpag: Siyam na Buhay as Mac-mac; Ryzza Mae Dizon — My Little Bossings as Ching; James "Bimby" Aquino-Yap — My Little Bossings as Justin / Tintoy	**Michiko Yamamoto and Erik Matti — On the Job**; Keiko Aquino and Ryllah Epifania Berico — 10,000 Hours; Catherine Camarillo and Guelan Varela-Luarca — Boy Golden: Shoot to Kill, the Arturo Porcuna Story; Ricardo “Ricky” Lee — Burgos; Antoinette Jadaone and Zigcarlo Dulay — Ekstra; Vanessa Valdez — Four Sisters and A Wedding; Ricardo “Ricky” Lee — Lauriana; Joel Mercado — Pagpag: Siyam na Buhay
Best Cinematography	Best Production Design
**Carlo Mendoza — Boy Golden: Shoot to Kill, the Arturo Porcuna Story**; Marissa Floirendo and Gilbert Vistan — 10,000 Hours; Anne Monzon and Monchie Redoble — Kung Fu Divas; David Abaya — Pagpag: Siyam na Buhay	**Joel Bilbao and Fritz Silorio — Boy Golden: Shoot to Kill, the Arturo Porcuna Story**; Joey Luna — 10,000 Hours; Mitoy Sta. Ana — Kung Fu Divas; Japz Nocom and Yhabz Mercado — Pagpag: Siyam na Buhay; Richard Somes — On the Job
Best Editing	Best Story
**Jay Halili — On the Job**; Joyce Bernal and Marya Ignacio — 10,000 Hours; Carlo Manatad, Jason Cahapay and Ryan Orduna — Boy Golden: Shoot to Kill, the Arturo Porcuna Story; Zigcarlo Dulay and Glenn Ituriaga — Ekstra; Marya Ignacio — Four Sisters and A Wedding; Marya Ignacio — It Takes A Man And A Woman	**Michiko Yamamoto and Erik Matti — On the Job**; Ryllah Epifania Berico and Keiko Aquino — 10,000 Hours; Catherine Camarillo and Anthony Guelan — Boy Golden: Shoot to Kill, the Arturo Porcuna Story; Ricardo “Ricky” Lee — Burgos; Ricardo Jimenez — Lauriana; Joel Mercado — Pagpag: Siyam na Buhay; Zigcarlo Dulay Antoninette Jadaone and Jeffrey Jeturian — Ekstra; Vanessa Valdez — Four Sisters and A Wedding
Best Sound	Best Musical Score
**Corinne de San Jose — On the Job**; Albert Michael Idioma, Addiss Tabong — 10,000 Hours; Albert Michael Idioma, Addiss Tabong — Boy Golden: Shoot to Kill, the Arturo Porcuna Story; Aurel Claro Bilbao — Four Sisters and A Wedding; Arnel M. Labayo — Pagpag: Siyam na Buhay	**Carmina Cuya — Boy Golden: Shoot to Kill, the Arturo Porcuna Story**; Teresa Barrozo — 10,000 Hours; Raul Mitra — Four Sisters and A Wedding; Francis Concio — Pagpag: Siyam na Buhay; Erwin Romulo — On the Job
Best Theme Song	Best Visual Effects
**"Midas" from Boy Golden: Shoot to Kill, the Arturo Porcuna Story — composed by Abra, arranged by Sonic State Audio and interpreted by Abra**; "Bakit Hindi Ka Crush ng Crush Mo" from Bakit Hindi Ka Crush ng Crush Mo? — lyrics and music by Jungee Marcelo and interpreted by Zia Quizon; "Di Ako Titigil" from Burgos — lyrics and music by Lucien Letaba, arranged by Melvin Corpin, interpreted by Beverly Sharon Flordeliz; "Hamon ng Buhay" from 10,000 Hours — composed, arranged and interpreted by Chito Miranda; "My Little Bossings" from My Little Bossings — produced, music and lyrics by Jan Ilacad, additional lyrics by Kevin Clay “Misterslim” Olaila, arranged by Kiko Salazar and RB “Kidwolf” Barbaso, performed by The Sassy Girls, Mister Slim and The Escaleras featuring Scrap Locc. and Bebe Riz and recorded at Bellhaus Digital Studios.	**Pagpag: Siyam na Buhay — Blackburst, Inc.**; Kung Fu Divas — Mothership, Inc./The O & Co. Picture Factory, Inc.; Boy Golden: Shoot to Kill, the Arturo Porcuna Story — Mothership, Inc./Eric Torrente; On the Job — Mothership, Inc.; 10,000 Hours — Richard Rico Francia and Rayjohn “Biker Dude” Fernandez

=== Special awards ===
German Moreno Youth Achievement Award

- Julia Barretto
- Ken Chan
- Janine Gutierrez
- Hiro Peralta
- Jerome Ponce
- James Reid

FAMAS Grand Award

- ER Ejercito

Fernando Poe Jr. Memorial Award

- Piolo Pascual

Art Padua Memorial Award

- Boy Abunda

Dr. Jose Perez Memorial Award

- Mario Dumaual

Exemplary Award for Public Service

- Engineer Felizardo Jun Sevilla Jr.

Excellence Award in Criminal Justice Pao Jail Visitation Team/Legal, Medical Dental, Optical Mission

- Persida Acosta

Presidential Award

- Tzu Chi Foundation

Male Celebrity Star of the Night

- Gerald Anderson

Female Celebrity Star of the Night

- KC Concepcion

Male Movie Star of the Night

- Gerald Anderson

Female Movie Star of the Night

- Valerie Concepcion
