= 2014 Box Office Entertainment Awards =

Annual Philippine entertainment awards

- Date: May 18, 2014
- Location: Manila

The 45th Guillermo Mendoza Memorial Scholarship Foundation Box Office Entertainment Awards (GMMSF-BOEA) is a part of the annual awards in the Philippines held on May 18, 2014. The award-giving body honors Filipino actors, actresses and other performers' commercial success, regardless of artistic merit, in the Philippine entertainment industry.

== Winners selection ==
On April 25, the Guillermo Mendoza Memorial Scholarship Foundation board of jurors met in the Basement Function Room of Barrio Fiesta in EDSA Greenhills. They deliberated for this year's winners and it took them four hours to reach their final decision.

The winners were chosen from the Top 10 Philippine films of 2013, top-rating shows in Philippine television, top recording awards received by singers, and top gross receipts of concerts and performances.

== Award ceremony ==
On May 18, 2014, at Solaire Resort & Casino in Parañaque, Philippines, the Box Office Entertainment Awards night was held.

=== Awards ===
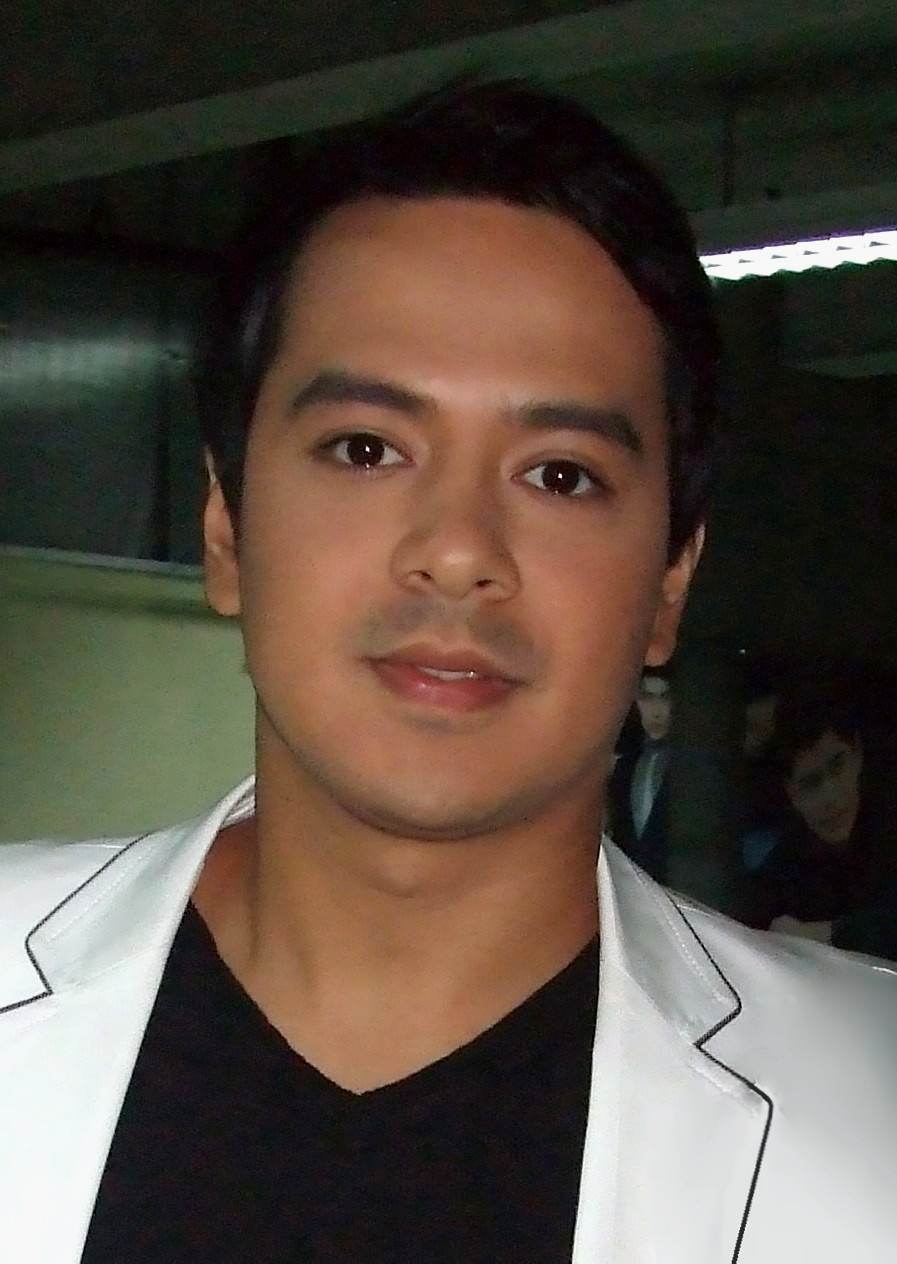
John Lloyd Cruz, Box Office King winner.

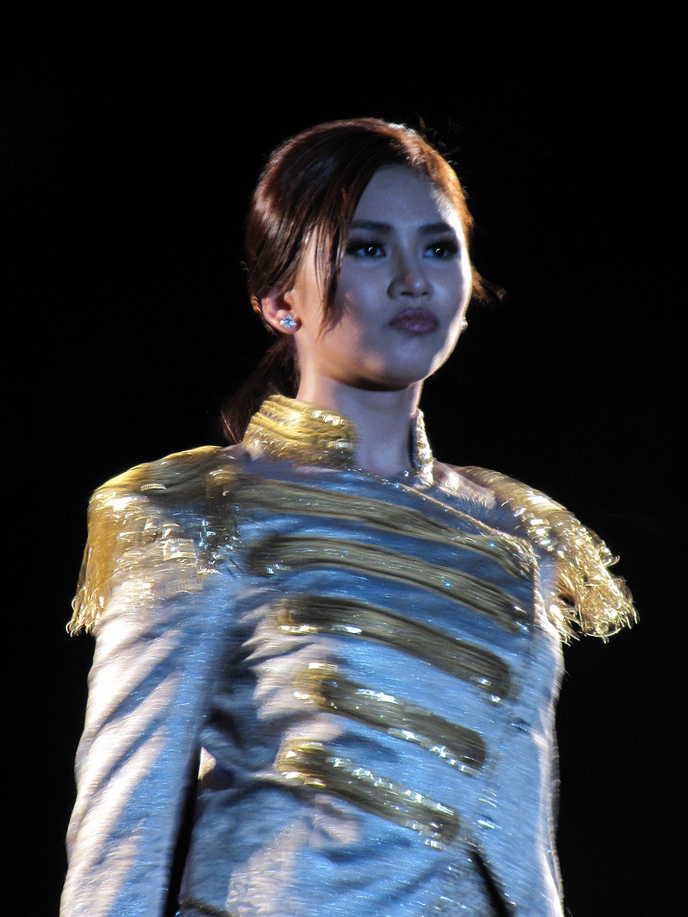
Sarah Geronimo, Triple-threat winner for Box Office Queen, Female Concert Performer of the Year and Female Recording Artist of the Year.

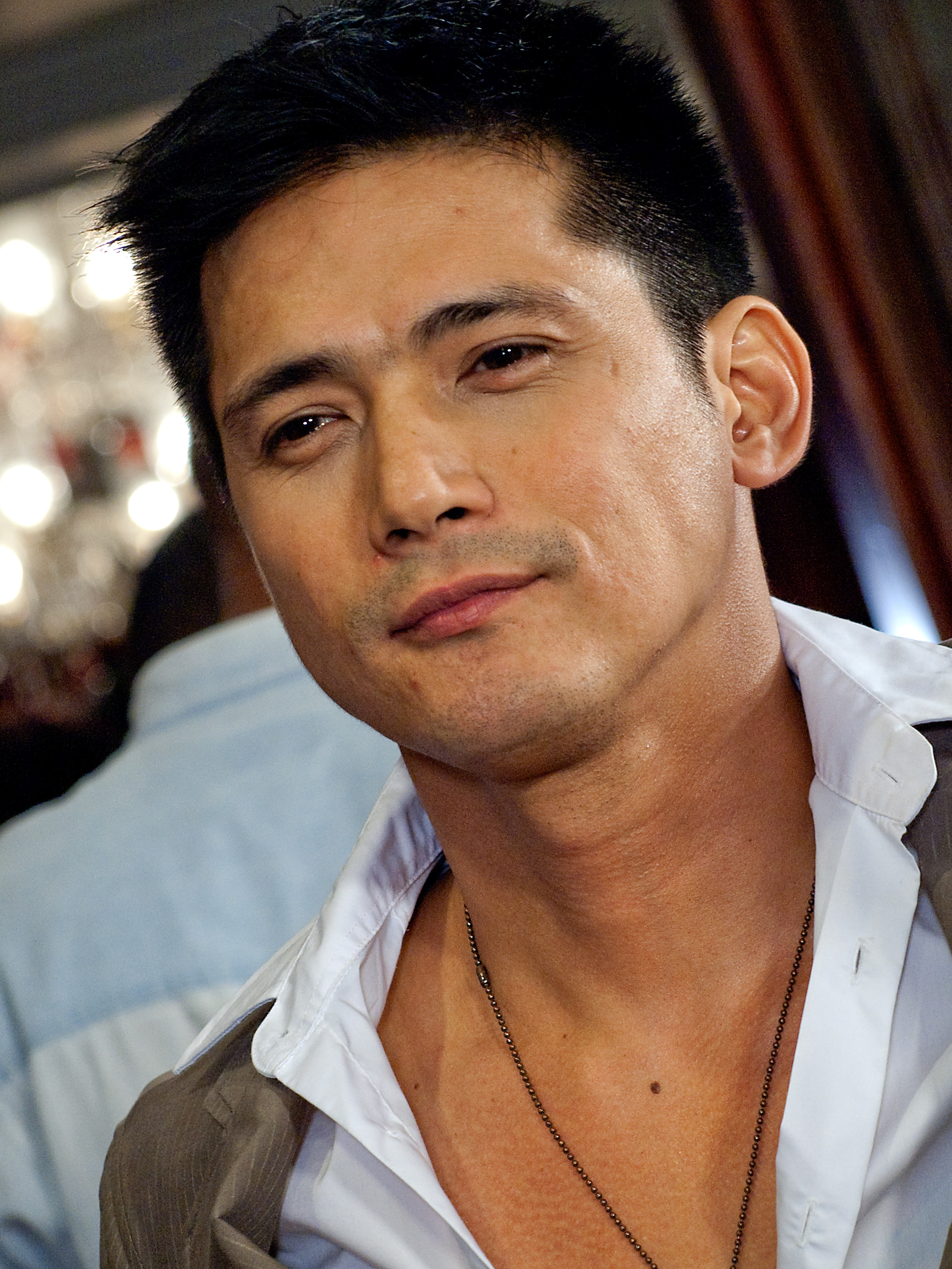
Robin Padilla, Film Actor of The Year winner.

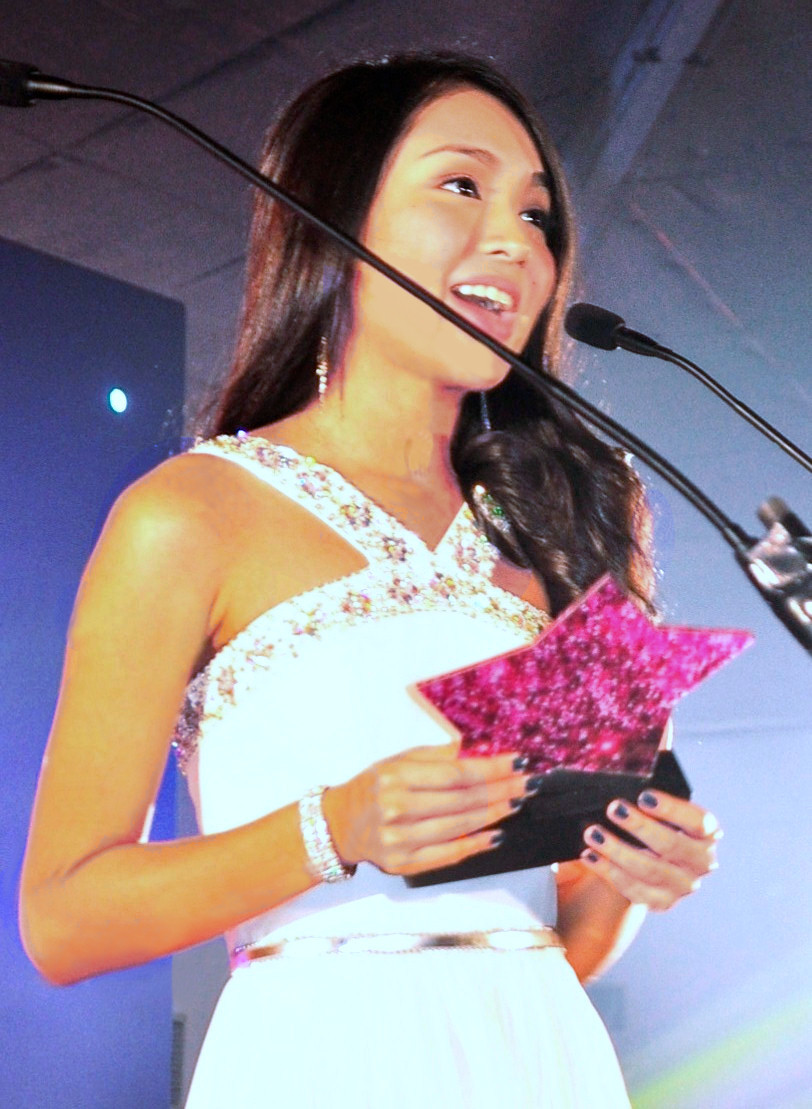
Kathryn Bernardo, Princess of Philippine Movies winner.

==== Major awards ====
- Phenomenal Stars - Vic Sotto and Vice Ganda (My Little Bossings and Girl, Boy, Bakla, Tomboy)
- Box Office King – John Lloyd Cruz (It Takes a Man and a Woman)
- Box Office Queen – Sarah Geronimo (It Takes a Man and a Woman)
- Male Concert Performer of the Year – Vice Ganda
- Female Concert Performer of the Year – Sarah Geronimo
- Male Recording Artist of the Year – Christian Bautista
- Female Recording Artist of the Year – Sarah Geronimo

==== Film category ====
- Phenomenal Child Stars – Ryzza Mae Dizon and James "Bimby" Aquino-Yap (My Little Bossings)
- Film Actor of The Year – Robin Padilla (10,000 Hours)
- Film Actress of the Year – Maricel Soriano (Girl, Boy, Bakla, Tomboy)
- Prince of Philippine Movies – Daniel Padilla (Pagpag: Siyam na Buhay)
- Princess of Philippine Movies – Kathryn Bernardo (Pagpag: Siyam na Buhay)
- Most Promising Male Star of the Year – Enrique Gil
- Most Promising Female Star of the Year – Janella Salvador
- Most Popular Film Producer – Star Cinema
- Most Popular Screenwriter – Carmi Raymundo (It Takes a Man and a Woman)
- Most Popular Film Directors – Marlon Rivera (My Little Bossings) and Wenn Deramas (Girl, Boy, Bakla, Tomboy)

==== Music category ====
- Promising Male Singer/Performer – Daniel Padilla
- Promising Female Singer/Performer – Bea Binene
- Most Popular Recording/Performing Group – Calla Lily
- Most Promising Recording/Performing Group – 1:43 ("Sa Isang Sulyap Mo")
- Most Popular Novelty Singer – Toni Gonzaga ("Kahit Na")

==== Television category ====
- Top Rating Primetime Drama – Juan dela Cruz (ABS-CBN)
- Top Rating Daytime Drama – Be Careful With My Heart (ABS-CBN)
- Top Rating News and Public Affairs – Kapuso Mo, Jessica Soho (GMA-7)
- Top Reality Talk/Talent Search/Game Show – The Voice Philippines (ABS-CBN)
- Top Rating Noontime Musical/Variety Program – Eat Bulaga! (GMA-7)
- Most Popular Loveteam on Television – Richard Yap and Jodi Sta. Maria (ABS-CBN)
- Most Promising Loveteam on Television – Janella Salvador and Jerome Ponce (ABS-CBN)
- Most Popular Male Child Performer – Raikko Mateo (Honesto - ABS-CBN)
- Most Popular Female Child Performer – Mutya Orquia (Be Careful With My Heart - ABS-CBN)

=== Special awards ===
- Bert Marcelo Lifetime Achievement Award – Pokwang
- Government Service Award – Manila Mayor Joseph Estrada

== Multiple awards ==
=== Individuals with multiple awards ===
The following individual names received two or more awards:

Awards	Name
3	Sarah Geronimo
2	Vice Ganda
2	Daniel Padilla
2	Janella Salvador

=== Companies with multiple awards ===
The following companies received one or multiple awards in the television category:

Awards	Company
7	ABS-CBN
2	GMA-7
