= Kaleidoscope World =

Kaleidoscope World may refer to:

- Kaleidoscope World (The Chills album)
  - "Kaleidoscope World" (The Chills song), 1982 single by The Chills
- Kaleidoscope World (Swing Out Sister album)
- "Kaleidoscope World" (Francis Magalona song)
- Kaleidoscope World (film), a 2013 Philippine hip hop musical dance film
