= The Ryzza Mae Show =

Philippine television talk show

- Title card
- Genre: Talk show
- Directed by: Bert de Leon
- Presented by: Ryzza Mae Dizon
- Theme music composer: Joey de Leon
- Opening theme: "Itaktak Mo" by Ryzza Mae Dizon
- Country of origin: Philippines
- Original language: Tagalog
- No. of episodes: 636

Production
- Executive producers: Antonio P. Tuviera; Malou Choa-Fagar
- Producer: Antonio P. Tuviera
- Production locations: TAPE Eastside Studio, GMA Broadway Centrum, New Manila, Quezon City, Philippines
- Camera setup: Multiple-camera setup
- Running time: 30 minutes
- Production company: TAPE Inc.

Original release
- Network: GMA Network
- Release: April 8, 2013 – September 18, 2015

The Ryzza Mae Show is a Philippine television talk show broadcast by GMA Network. Directed by Bert de Leon, it is hosted by Ryzza Mae Dizon. It premiered on April 8, 2013 on the network's morning line up. The show concluded on September 18, 2015, with a total of 636 episodes.

== Ratings ==
According to AGB Nielsen Philippines' Mega Manila household television ratings, the pilot episode of The Ryzza Mae Show earned a 17.5% rating. The final episode scored a 15.5% rating.

== Accolades ==
Accolades received by The Ryzza Mae Show
| Year | Award | Category | Recipient | Result | Ref. |
|---|---|---|---|---|---|
| 2013 | 27th PMPC Star Awards for Television | Best Celebrity Talk Show | The Ryzza Mae Show | Nominated | |
| 2013 | 27th PMPC Star Awards for Television | Best Celebrity Talk Show Host | Ryzza Mae Dizon | Nominated | |
| 2014 | Golden Screen TV Awards | Outstanding Celebrity Talk Program | The Ryzza Mae Show | Nominated | |
| 2014 | Golden Screen TV Awards | Outstanding Celebrity Talk Program Host | Ryzza Mae Dizon | Nominated | |
| 2014 | 28th PMPC Star Awards for Television | Best Celebrity Talk Show | The Ryzza Mae Show | Nominated | |
| 2014 | 28th PMPC Star Awards for Television | Best Celebrity Talk Show Host | Ryzza Mae Dizon | Nominated | |
| 2015 | 29th PMPC Star Awards for Television | Best Celebrity Talk Show | The Ryzza Mae Show | Nominated | |
