= List of 2013 box office number-one films in the Philippines =

This is a list of films which placed number one at the weekend box office for the year 2013 in the Philippines.

== Number-one films ==
†	This implies the highest-grossing movie of the year.

#	Date	Film	Gross (Dollars)	Gross (Peso)	Notes
2	January 13, 2013	Life of Pi	$924,100	N/A	
3	January 20, 2013	Les Misérables	$1,065,922	₱43,112,281	
4	January 27, 2013	Hansel and Gretel: Witch Hunters	$1,263,984	₱51,176,058	
5	February 3, 2013	Chinese Zodiac	$885,258	₱35,897,743	
6	February 10, 2013	Chinese Zodiac	$315,919	₱12,828,428	
7	February 17, 2013	A Good Day to Die Hard	$1,118,314	₱45,301,894	
8	February 24, 2013	A Good Day to Die Hard	$474,564	₱19,283,623	
9	March 3, 2013	Jack the Giant Slayer	$1,276,982	₱51,815,716	
10	March 10, 2013	Oz the Great and Powerful	$740,906	₱30,094,787	
11	March 17, 2013	Oz the Great and Powerful	$540,260	₱21,863,944	
12	March 24, 2013	The Croods	$555,788	₱22,665,201	
13	March 31, 2013	It Takes a Man and a Woman*	$1,496,829	₱60,975,425	
14	April 7, 2013	It Takes a Man and a Woman*	$2,473,066	₱101,570,304	
15	April 14, 2013	It Takes a Man and a Woman*	$1,243,683	₱51,301,426	
16	April 21, 2013	It Takes a Man and a Woman*	$653,771	₱26,807,226	It Takes a Man and a Woman became the first and only Filipino film of 2013 to top the box office for four consecutive weekends.
17	April 28, 2013	Iron Man 3 †	$7,413,925	N/A	
18	May 5, 2013	Iron Man 3 †	$3,439,288	₱140,177,812	
19	May 12, 2013	Iron Man 3 †	$1,112,819	₱45,651,508	
20	May 19, 2013	Star Trek Into Darkness	$819,504	₱33,691,203	
21	May 26, 2013	Fast & Furious 6	$2,147,748	₱89,155,597	
22	June 2, 2013	Fast & Furious 6	$1,700,981	₱71,884,478	
23	June 9, 2013	After Earth	$1,205,912	₱50,483,938	
24	June 16, 2013	Man of Steel	$5,770,726	₱245,085,619	Man of Steel had the highest weekend debut of 2013.
25	June 23, 2013	World War Z	$2,030,174	₱88,905,177	
26	June 30, 2013	Monsters University	$1,349,834	N/A	
27	July 7, 2013	Despicable Me 2	$2,897,427	N/A	
28	July 14, 2013	Pacific Rim	$1,918,516	₱83,023,396	
29	July 21, 2013	Pacific Rim	$957,052	₱41,343,498	
30	July 28, 2013	The Wolverine	$2,195,343	₱93,687,799	
31	August 4, 2013	Bakit Hindi Ka Crush Ng Crush Mo?*	$1,187,257	₱51,711,691	
32	August 11, 2013	Percy Jackson: Sea of Monsters	$1,798,632	₱78,152,539	
33	August 18, 2013	Percy Jackson: Sea of Monsters	$745,186	₱32,433,550	
34	August 25, 2013	The Conjuring	$758,460	₱33,477,211	
35	September 1, 2013	The Mortal Instruments: City of Bones	$240,915	₱10,725,560	The Mortal Instruments: City of Bones reached the #1 spot in its second weekend of release and had the lowest number-one weekend of 2013.
36	September 8, 2013	Elysium	$657,904	₱29,121,857	
37	September 15, 2013	Elysium	$348,965	₱15,235,777	
38	September 22, 2013	Insidious Chapter 2	$1,175,759	₱50,560,341	
39	September 29, 2013	Insidious Chapter 2	$634,710	₱27,426,454	
40	October 8, 2013	Gravity	$725,745	₱31,232,291	
41	October 13, 2013	Gravity	$531,080	₱22,778,765	
42	October 20, 2013	She's the One*	$1,265,382	₱54,384,853	
43	October 27, 2013	She's the One*	$664,498	₱28,549,758	
44	November 3, 2013	Thor: The Dark World	$4,625,040	N/A	
45	November 10, 2013	Thor: The Dark World	$1,522,062	₱65,619,137	
46	November 17, 2013	Thor: The Dark World	$608,140	₱26,418,818	
47	November 24, 2013	The Hunger Games: Catching Fire	$3,255,814	₱142,608,235	
48	December 1, 2013	The Hunger Games: Catching Fire	$1,528,793	₱66,586,273	
49	December 8, 2013	Frozen	$542,944	₱23,808,963	Frozen reached the #1 spot in its second weekend of release.
50	December 15, 2013	The Hobbit: The Desolation of Smaug	$1,736,322	₱76,460,328	
51	December 22, 2013	The Hobbit: The Desolation of Smaug	$908,444	₱40,311,385	

*means of Philippine origin.

== Total Gross ==
#	Release Date	Film	Total Gross	Notes
1	April 24, 2013	Iron Man 3	$14,949,472	
2	March 30, 2013	It Takes a Man and a Woman*	$9,141,744	
3	June 12, 2013	Man of Steel	$8,927,595	
4	October 30, 2013	Thor: The Dark World	$7,950,502	
5	May 24, 2013	Fast & Furious 6	$5,916,627	
6	November 21, 2013	The Hunger Games: Catching Fire	$5,838,664	
7	July 3, 2013	Despicable Me 2	$5,321,858	
8	June 19, 2013	World War Z	$4,779,601	
9	March 30, 2013	G.I. Joe: Retaliation	$4,560,225	
10	July 25, 2013	The Wolverine	$3,960,327	

*Local Film
