= Kaleidoscope World (film) =

- Theatrical poster
- Directed by: Eliza Cornejo
- Starring: Sef Cadayona; Yassi Pressman
- Production company: iAct Productions
- Release date: December 25, 2013
- Country: Philippines
- Language: Filipino

Kaleidoscope World is a 2013 Philippine hip hop musical dance film. It is directed by Eliza Cornejo under iAct Productions and stars Sef Cadayona and Yassi Pressman.

It features a poor boy and a rich girl who meets each other in an audition for a dance troupe seeking to compete internationally.

== Cast ==
- Yassi Pressman as Elsa, a woman who returns to the Philippines from the United States who takes up dancing. Her family discourages her from pursuing dance.
- Sef Cadayona as Lando, a working student who financially supports his family and a dancer. This is Cadayona's first lead role in a feature film.

It also features dance groups such as the Philippine All Stars and the UP Streetdance Club.

== Production ==
The film was already in production in 2012, and was meant to be entered for an independent film festival within the same year. However the film was not finished in time due to budgeting issues.

== Music ==
Kaleidoscope World is named after the Francis Magalona song of the same name. The deceased musician's songs were heavily used in the film.

== Release ==
Kaleidoscope World was released in the Philippines on December 25, 2013, as one of the official entries of the 2013 Metro Manila Film Festival.
