= Bimby Aquino Yap =

Filipino television host and former child actor (born 2007)

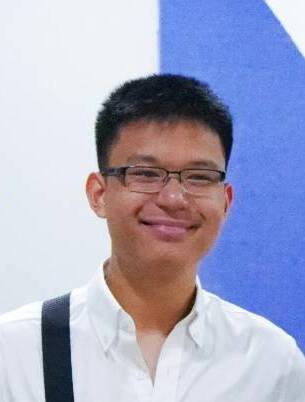
- Yap in 2024
- Born: James Carlos Aquino Yap Jr. April 19, 2007 (age 19); Makati, Philippines
- Other name: Baby James
- Education: Homeschooled
- Occupations: Television host; actor
- Years active: 2010–present
- Notable work: My Little Bossings; The Amazing Praybeyt Benjamin; Kris & Bimby Summer TV
- Parents: James Yap (father); Kris Aquino (mother)
- Relatives: Aquino family; Cojuangco family; Jose W. Diokno (8th cousin) (Note: Diokno's ancestor is Demetria Sumulong, who was born in Antipolo before moving south, her common ancestor with Aquino Yap is Francisco Sumulong (born 1695).)

James Carlos "Bimby" Aquino Yap Jr. (Tagalog: [ˈbimbɪ ʔɐˈxiː.no jap]; born April 19, 2007) is a Filipino television host, media personality and former child actor. He made his film debut in My Little Bossings (2013).

== Early life and education ==
Bimby Aquino Yap was born as James Carlos Aquino Yap Jr. at 4:50 pm on April 19, 2007 at Makati Medical Center in Makati, to television host and actress Kris Aquino and basketball player James Yap. When he was 3 years old, they separated and had their marriage eventually annulled when he was 4. He is currently homeschooling since elementary. He attended junior high school at Brent International School.

== Acting career ==
Yap started his acting career in 2010. He made his first appearance on TV Kung Tayo'y Magkakalayo as a guest role alongside his mother. He made his first movie Noy as a cameo role. In 2013, he made appearance on TV Vampire ang Daddy Ko as a guest role alongside his mother followed by the debut movie in My Little Bossings.

== Personal life ==
Yap is Catholic. In 2016, Yap experienced a concussion on the head. In October 2020, Yap was reported to be 6 feet (1.8 m) tall (nearly as tall as his father) and still growing, according to an Instagram post by his mother, Kris Aquino.

== Filmography ==
=== Film ===
Year	Title	Role	Note	Ref.
2010	Noy	Himself/Cameo	Special participation	
2013	My Little Bossings	Justin/Tintoy	Main role, Official 39th Metro Manila Film Festival entry	
2014	The Amazing Praybeyt Benjamin	Bimbee Pineda Chua	Main role, Official 40th Metro Manila Film Festival entry	
2015	All You Need Is Pag-ibig	Jake	Supporting role, Official 41st Metro Manila Film Festival entry	

=== Television ===
Year	Title	Role	Notes	Ref.
2010	Kung Tayo'y Magkakalayo	Michael de Jesus Crisanto	Special Participation	
2011-2016	Kris TV	Himself	Guest/Host	
2013, 2026	Eat Bulaga!	Himself	Guest/Co-host	
2013	Vampire ang Daddy Ko	Himself	Guest	

== Accolades ==
Year	Award	Category	Notable Work	Result	Ref.
2013	Baby & Family Expo Philippines 2013	Golden Kids of the Year (with Ryzza Mae Dizon)	My Little Bossings	Won	
2013	39th Metro Manila Film Festival	Best Child Performer	My Little Bossings	Nominated	
2014	GMMSF Box-Office Entertainment Awards	Phenomenal Child Star (with Ryzza Mae Dizon)	My Little Bossings	Won	
2014	62nd FAMAS Awards	Best Child Performer	My Little Bossings	Nominated	
2014	40th Metro Manila Film Festival	Best Child Performer	The Amazing Praybeyt Benjamin	Nominated	
2015	Platinum Stallion Media Awards	Best Child Male Film Actor	The Amazing Praybeyt Benjamin	Won	
2015	SKAL Tourism Awards	Youngest Tourism Media Personality	Kris & Bimby Summer TV	Won	
2015	5th EdukCircle Awards	Most Influential Film Child Star of the Year	The Amazing Praybeyt Benjamin	Won	
2016	Platinum Stallion Media Awards	Best Child Male Film Actor	All You Need Is Pag-Ibig	Won	
