= Ryzza Mae Dizon =

Filipino television personality (born 2005)

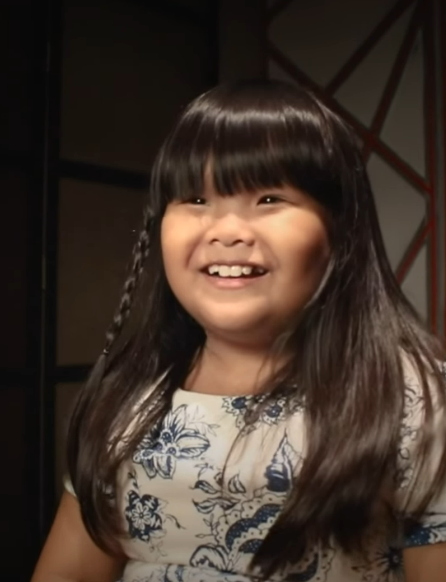
- Ryzza in 2016
- Born: Ryzza Mae A. Dizon; June 12, 2005 (age 21); Angeles City, Philippines
- Occupations: Actress; comedian; television host
- Years active: 2012–present
- Agent: APT Entertainment
- Television: GMA Network; TV5

Ryzza Mae A. Dizon (Tagalog: [ˈrɐjsa meɪ ˈdɪsɔn]; born June 12, 2005) is a Filipino television personality and actress. She began her career as a child performer after winning Eat Bulaga!'s Little Miss Philippines. She appeared in a number of blockbuster films from 2012 to 2017 as a child actress. Her accolades include an Aliw Award, two Metro Manila Film Festival Awards, and four Box Office Entertainment Awards.

== Early life and education ==
Ryzza Mae A. Dizon was born on June 12, 2005. She finished elementary and junior high school education at Eton International School. In 2015, during her elementary years, she earned an Excellence in Verbal Linguistic Award and the Eton Achiever Special Award. She then went to Far Eastern University High School under the Humanities and Social Sciences strand and completed her studies in 2025.

== Career ==
In 2012, Dizon auditioned for the title of Little Miss Philippines. She was eliminated, but was called back to compete again for a wild card round. After returning to the competition, she went on to win, and was crowned as Little Miss Philippines 2012. Her win marked the start of her career in the Philippine showbiz industry. She is one of the hosts of Eat Bulaga!, a noontime variety show in the Philippines.

Dizon is also part of the 2012 Metro Manila Film Festival entry film Si Agimat, si Enteng Kabisote at si Ako where she played a dwarf.

Dizon's life story was featured in the weekly anthology Magpakailanman where she appeared in an autobiographical role. The episode focused on the life of Dizon prior to her career as a child actress. The episode garnered 26.7% audience share versus its rival show Maalaala Mo Kaya which garnered 20.9%.

In 2013, Dizon co-starred in Vampire ang Daddy Ko, marking her first major sitcom role after her appearance in Tweets for My Sweet in 2012.

On April 1, 2013, during a live airing of Eat Bulaga! in the segment "Juan for All, All for Juan: Bayanihan of D' Pipol", Vic Sotto announced that Dizon will have her own talk show entitled The Ryzza Mae Show, which first aired on April 8, 2013.

In September 2013, two separate incidents involving Dizon prompted the Movie and Television Review and Classification Board (MTRCB) to call a mandatory conference to explain “scenes allegedly insensitive and unfriendly to children,” in the programs Eat Bulaga! and The Ryzza Mae Show. The board deemed that the incidents "palpably violate the dignity of the child". Following the conference, the MTRCB stated that broadcaster GMA Network and producer TAPE, Inc. has acknowledged lapses in the scenes of concern and representatives have reached an agreement with the board to cooperate and set guidelines in protecting Dizon on her own talk show and in the noontime variety show.

On December 25, 2013, Dizon appeared alongside Bimby Aquino Yap, Kris Aquino and Vic Sotto in My Little Bossings. In spite of criticism directed at the plot and its use of product placement, the film was a financial success at the 2013 Metro Manila Film Festival, earning first place at the box office. My Little Bossings was later followed by the fantasy-action anthology film My Big Bossing alongside Vic Sotto and Marian Rivera in December 2014.

In 2015, Dizon played the lead role in the comedy-drama series Princess in the Palace produced by TAPE, Inc. together with Ice Seguerra and Eula Valdez, also starring Boots Anson-Roa, Ciara Sotto, Marc Abaya, and Joey Paras. This also marked Dizon's first starring role in a teleserye. Princess in the Palace was later replaced by Calle Siete, of which Dizon also starred in.

On May 31, 2023, Dizon—along with other co-hosts and staff of Eat Bulaga!—filed their resignation soon after the show's main hosts, Tito Sotto, Vic Sotto, and Joey de Leon, announced their exit from the show's producer, TAPE Incorporated, and GMA Network on the same day.

== Filmography ==
=== Film ===
Year	Title	Role	Note(s)
2012	Si Agimat, si Enteng Kabisote at si Ako	Chichay	
2013	My Little Bossings	Ching	
2014	My Big Bossing's Adventures	Jessa ("Sirena") / Angel ("Taktak") / Biiktoria or Victoria ("Prinsesa")	Played multiple roles
2015	My Bebe Love:#KiligPaMore	Cameo role	
2016	Enteng Kabisote 10 and the Abangers	Bubu	
2017	Trip Ubusan: The Lolas vs. Zombies	Marcy	
2018	Jack Em Popoy: The Puliscredibles	Bebang	
2026	The Greatest Showdown	TBA	

=== Television ===
Year	Title	Role	Note(s)
2012	Wil Time Bigtime	Herself (contestant)	
2012	Tweets for My Sweet	Illuminada	
2012	Magpakailanman	Herself	Episode: "The Ryzza Mae Dizon Story"
2012–present	Eat Bulaga!	Herself (co-host)	
2013	Perpetua: An APT Entertainment Lenten Drama Special	Chacha / Angel	
2013–2016	Vampire ang Daddy Ko	Big	
2013–2015	The Ryzza Mae Show	Herself (host)	
2014	Pangalawang Bukas: An Eat Bulaga Lenten Drama Special	Angel	
2015	Eat Bulaga Lenten Special: Lukso ng Dugo	Myka	
2015–2016	Princess in the Palace	Princess Cruz	
2016	Calle Siete	Barbie Delloso	
2016–2017	Hay, Bahay!	Kuting (guest role)	
2017	Sunday PinaSaya	Herself (guest)	
2017	The Lolas' Beautiful Show	Herself (guest)	
2017	Love Is...	young Angela	
2019	Eat Bulaga Lenten Special: Ikigai: Buhay ng Buhay Ko	Shayla Mae	
2020	Daddy's Gurl	Cha-Cha	
2023–2024	E.A.T...	Herself (co-host)	
2024	Eat Bulaga Lenten Special: Love Thy Neighbor	Tweetums	
2024	Da Pers Family	Herself (guest)	
2025	Eat Bulaga Lenten Special: Libre ng Mangarap	Jengjeng	

== Accolades ==
Year	Association	Category	Work	Result	Ref.
2012	1st PP Most Liked Awards	Most Liked New Kapuso Artist		Won	
2013	44th Box-Office Entertainment Awards	Most Popular Female Child Performer	The Ryzza Mae Show	Won	
2013	44th Box-Office Entertainment Awards	Most Popular Novelty Singers (with Jose & Wally)	"Cha Cha Dabarkads" Song	Won	
2013	3rd Yahoo! OMG Awards	Child Star of the Year		Won	
2013	3rd EdukCircle Awards	Best Talk Show Host	The Ryzza Mae Show	Won	
2013	26th Aliw Awards	Best Child Performer	The Jose and Wally Concert: A Party for Juan and All	Won	
2013	27th PMPC Star Awards for Television	Best Comedy Actress	Vampire Ang Daddy Ko	Nominated	
2013	27th PMPC Star Awards for Television	Best Celebrity Talk Show Host	The Ryzza Mae Show	Nominated	
2013	Baby & Family Expo Philippines 2013	Golden Kids of the Year (with Bimby Aquino-Yap)	My Little Bossings	Won	
2013	International Business and Academe Conference	Breakthrough Talk Show Host	The Ryzza Mae Show	Won	
2013	39th Metro Manila Film Festival	Best Child Performer	My Little Bossings	Won	
2013	Rappler Social Media Awards	Pinoy Celebrity of the Year		Won	
2014	12th Gawad Tanglaw	BATA Award (Bibo, Aktibo at Talentadong Anak ng Sining)	The Ryzza Mae Show	Won	
2014	30th PMPC Star Awards for Movies	Movie Child Performer of the Year	My Little Bossings	Won	
2014	5th Golden Screen TV Awards	Youngest TV Host	The Ryzza Mae Show	Special Citation	
2014	Dabarkads Awards	Best Child Performer	Pangalawang Bukas	Won	
2014	45th Box Office Entertainment Awards	Phenomenal Child Star (with Bimby Aquino-Yap)	My Little Bossings	Won	
2014	1st PEP List Awards	Pepster's Choice: Female Child Star of the Year		Won	
2014	1st PEP List Awards	Editor's Choice: Child Star of the Year		Won	
2014	62nd FAMAS Awards	Best Child Performer	My Little Bossings	Nominated	
2014	4th EdukCircle Awards	Most Influential Film Child Stars of the Year		Won	
2014	6th Star Awards for Music	Novelty Song of the Year (with Jose & Wally)	"Cha Cha Dabarkads" Song	Won	
2014	40th Metro Manila Film Festival	Best Child Performer	My Big Bossing	Won	
2015	2nd Paragala Central Luzon Media Awards	Best Female Child Performer	My Little Bossings	Won	
2015	Trinity University of Asia Platinum Stallion Media Awards 2015	Best Child Female Film Actress	My Big Bossing	Won	
2015	63rd FAMAS Awards	Best Child Performer	My Big Bossing	Nominated	
2015	46th Box Office Entertainment Awards	Most Popular Female Child Performer	My Big Bossing	Won	
2015	GIC Innovation Awards for Television	Most Innovative TV Child Star	Eat Bulaga!	Won	
2015	5th EdukCircle Awards	Most Influential Film Child Star of the Year	My Big Bossing	Won	
2016	ComGuild Academe's Choice Awards	Most Loved Child Endorsers (with Baby Baste)		Won	
2017	8th NwSSU Students' Choice Awards for Radio and Television	Best Female Child Star		Won	
