= 10,000 Hours (film) =

- Theatrical release poster
- Directed by: Bb. Joyce Bernal
- Screenplay by: Rylla Epifania Berico; Keiko Aquino
- Story by: Neil Arce; Peter Serrano; Bela Padilla; Joyce Bernal
- Produced by: Neil Arce; Nikolo Juban; Lope V. Juban Jr.; Boy 2 Quizon; Vic del Rosario Jr.
- Starring: Robin Padilla
- Cinematography: Marissa Floirendo; Gilberto Vistan
- Edited by: Marya Ignacio; Joyce Bernal
- Music by: Teresa Barrozo
- Production companies: N^{2} Pictures; Philippine Film Studios
- Distributed by: GMA Films; Viva Films
- Release date: December 25, 2013
- Running time: 107 minutes
- Country: Philippines
- Language: Filipino

10,000 Hours is a 2013 Filipino action thriller film co-edited and directed by Joyce E. Bernal. The film stars Robin Padilla as a Philippine senator forced to go on the run. The film was released by Viva Films on December 25, 2013, as an official entry of the 39th Metro Manila Film Festival, where it won 14 awards, including Best Picture, Best Director (for Bernal), and Best Actor (for Padilla).

== Plot ==
In 2010, Senator Gabriel Alcaraz prepares a privilege speech revealing details of a corruption scandal at the highest levels of the government, implicating President Genoviva Obrero. However, on the day he is supposed to deliver the speech at the Senate, a close ally, NBI director San Juan, is assassinated while trying to warn him of a plan to arrest him. Undaunted, Alcaraz leaves his family and slips out of the Senate complex just as a police detail led by his old colleague, Director Dante Cristobal, move in to serve the warrant. He heads to Ninoy Aquino International Airport, but knowing that the police are waiting for him there, slips out of the country aboard a ship with help from TV reporter Maya Limchauco and an associate of the San Juan. He arrives in Amsterdam, where Isabelle Manahan, a Filipino expatriate who works with the UN, shelters the senator but discourages him against contacting his loved ones back home; the family falls into despair from the backlash over his escape.

Flashbacks over the course of the film reveal that Alcaraz, Cristobal and San Juan were partners in the police force, who were assigned in 1986 to rescue Manahan who was then kidnapped by an erring judge. A police informer, Sebastian Jago, helped in saving Manahan. The judge is arrested but ten years later, he tried to kill Alcaraz and his family for being the source of his woes; Alcaraz actually killed him in self-defense. Now hiding in the Netherlands, Jago is sought by Alcaraz to come home and clear his name, using a picture of his daughter and newborn grandson as encouragement.

The authorities alert Interpol about Alcaraz and gradually zero in on his location. The discovery of his whereabouts triggers his wife's stroke as Cristobal and Limchauco separately fly to the Netherlands to find him. Manahan provides Alcaraz and Jago with separate tickets to fly back to the Philippines. Limchauco successfully helps Alcaraz avoid Cristobal and the Dutch police, but upon revealing herself as a daughter of the judge, wants to kill him instead to avenge her father's death. Alcaraz convinces her to get the whole story from Manahan and help Jago as he comes clean back in the Philippines.

Approximately 10,000 hours - one year, one month, and one week - after leaving the Philippines, Alcaraz flies back by private plane and reunites with his family. He plays over Maya's news show an audiotape Jago preserved for years, which names many corrupt government officials. However, nearly all of them are dead under various circumstances while a petty thug kills Jago in his cell and is subsequently silenced by a prison guard. The police chief, who hired the thug and the prison guard, tells President Obrero that another of the named officials is about to die of a stroke.

== Cast ==
Main cast

- Robin Padilla as Sen. Gabriel Molino Alcaraz
  - Alden Richards as young Gabriel
- Michael de Mesa as Dir. Dante Cristobal
  - Joem Bascon as young Dante
- Bela Padilla as Maya Limchauco

Supporting cast

- Pen Medina as Sebastian Jago
- Mylene Dizon as Anna
- Carla Humphries as Isabelle Manahan
- Bibeth Orteza as Pres. Genoviva Obrero
- Cholo Barretto as Benjo Alcaraz
- Ejay Falcon as Gabriel's son

== Development ==
The film's plot draws inspiration from Philippine Senator Panfilo Lacson's controversial flight in 2010 as he was about to be arrested over the 2000 Dacer-Corbito double murder case. He said the production team paid him an unknown sum for the film rights and let him choose the lead actor and director for the project. However, he claims additional details behind his escape will be available in a book he is writing. Bernal herself landed the project after passing up directorial duties for two other co-entries - My Little Bossings and Kimmy Dora: Ang Kiyemeng Prequel.

The movie was shot at the premises of NAIA Terminal 3 and the Philippine Senate, with footage from the security cameras integrated into the cinematography. The Amsterdam scenes included shooting inside the Schiphol International Airport. A number of Filipino expatriates in Amsterdam were recruited for the shoot.

== Critical reception ==
The film got mostly positive reviews. Maridol Ranoa-Bismark of Yahoo! Philippines said the film was relevant considering the current political climate in the Philippines while Fred Hawson of ABS-CBN News praised the movie's technical aspects that shone to the quality of foreign films.

On the other hand, Carl Joe Javier of GMA Network claims the movie cherry-picked social issues without focusing on them clearly.

== Accolades ==
The movie brought home 14 of the 17 awards up for grabs at the 39th Metro Manila Film Festival including the Best Picture and Best Actor awards.

| Year | Category | Recipient | Result |
|---|---|---|---|
| 2013 | Best Picture | 10,000 Hours | Won |
| 2013 | Best Director | Joyce Bernal | Won |
| 2013 | Best Actor | Robin Padilla | Won |
| 2013 | Best Actress | Bela Padilla | Nominated |
| 2013 | Best Supporting Actor | Pen Medina | Won |
| 2013 | Best Screenplay | | Won |
| 2013 | Best Original Story | | Won |
| 2013 | Best Cinematography | | Won |
| 2013 | Best Editing | Marya Ignacio | Won |
| 2013 | Best Production Design | | Won |
| 2013 | Best Visual Effects | | Won |
| 2013 | Best Musical Score | Teresa Barrozo | Won |
| 2013 | Best Sound Engineering | Emmanuel Clemente | Won |
| 2013 | Gatpuno Antonio J. Villegas Cultural Awards | 10,000 Hours | Won |
| 2013 | Fernando Poe Jr. Memorial Award for Excellence | 10,000 Hours | Won |
| 2014 | Film Actor of the Year | Robin Padilla | Won |

== See also ==
- Ping Lacson: Super Cop
