= Kung Fu Divas =

- Film poster
- Directed by: Onat Diaz
- Written by: Onat Diaz
- Produced by: Charo Santos-Concio; Malou N. Santos; Ai-Ai delas Alas; Marian Rivera; Erik Matti; Dondon Monteverde; Onat Diaz; Leonardo Po; Louie Araneta; Joseph Nebriaga
- Starring: Ai-Ai delas Alas; Marian Rivera
- Cinematography: Anne Monzon; Monchie Redoble
- Edited by: Christopher Cantos; Billy de Leon; Jay Halili; Melvyn M. Quimosing; Bong Villasenor
- Music by: IJ Garcia
- Production companies: Star Cinema; Reality Entertainment; The O&Co. Picture Factory
- Distributed by: Star Cinema; Columbia Pictures (US)
- Release date: October 2, 2013
- Running time: 125 mins
- Country: Philippines
- Languages: Tagalog; English; Mandarin
- Box office: ₱65 million (4 weeks)

Kung Fu Divas is a 2013 Philippine action comedy film directed by Onat Diaz and starring Ai-Ai delas Alas and Marian Rivera. The lead stars also co-produced the film, which opened in theaters on October 2, 2013, as part of Star Cinema's 20th Anniversary presentation.

The film is a parody of Gu Long's Wuxia novel Juedai Shuangjiao.

== Plot ==
Charlotte (Ai-Ai delas Alas) is from a family of beauty queens, but she has yet to win a title of her own. Her final chance is the Hiyas ng Dalampasigan (“Seaside Jewel”) Pageant, and her mother has taken steps to ensure she wins. She is threatened when the mysterious Samantha (Marian Rivera) suddenly enters the contest.

The two become bitter rivals following the contest, but they are soon forced by destiny to team up. The two discover their hidden connection to a mystical past, and must work together to know the truth about their heritage.

== Cast ==
- Ai-Ai delas Alas as Charlotte/Lyna (Xiao Yu-Er?)
- Marian Rivera as Samantha/Mena (Hua Wu-Que?)
- Roderick Paulate as San-ing
- Gloria Diaz as Charlotte's adoptive mother
- Edward Mendez as Kojic / Pei Pa-Kwa
- Nova Villa as San-ing's mother
- Ruffa Gutierrez as Kokuryo
- Martin Escudero
- Roy Alvarez† as Charlotte's adoptive father
- Precious Lara Quigaman
- Bianca Manalo
- German Moreno† as Hiyas ng Dalampasigan host (cameo)
- Vicki Belo as a fictional version of herself (cameo)
- Cacai Bautista as Samantha's original face (cameo)

== Reception ==
Duane Lucas Pascua of Spot.ph (a publication of Summit Media) both gave praise to the film and its director, saying: "One of the key strengths of the film is how it pokes fun into the varied facets of modern Filipino culture while managing to stay away from being preachy." Nestor U. Torre of Philippine Daily Inquirer said the film is "visually vivid, doesn't scrimp on production values, and elicit perky performances from its actors," while also pointed out that it "fails to come off as a complete treat, due to deficiencies in its storytelling, and what eventually turns out to be its too varied mix of disparate elements, which fail to harmoniously fuse together by the film’s final fade."

== International Film Festivals ==
- FANTASPORTO 2014-34th Oporto International Film Festival
  - Official Selection - Orient Express Section
- 14th Neuchatel International Fantastic Film Festival
  - Official Selection - New Cinema From Asia
- Feratum 2014, Mexico
  - Exhibition Film

== Awards ==
- 62nd FAMAS Awards 2014
  - Best Special Effects - Winner
  - Best Actress: Marian Rivera - Nominated
  - Best Cinematography - Nominated
  - Best Production Design - Nominated
  - Best Visual Effects - Nominated
