= Pagpag: Siyam na Buhay =

2013 film by Frasco S. Mortiz

- Theatrical release poster
- Directed by: Frasco S. Mortiz
- Screenplay by: Joel M. Mercado; Kren Yap
- Story by: Joel M. Mercado
- Produced by: Charo Santos-Concio; Malou Santos; Lily Y. Monteverde; Roselle Y. Monteverde
- Starring: Kathryn Bernardo; Daniel Padilla; Paulo Avelino; Shaina Magdayao
- Cinematography: David Diaz Abaya
- Edited by: Jerrold Tarog
- Music by: Francis S. Concio
- Production companies: ABS-CBN Film Productions, Inc.; Regal Entertainment
- Distributed by: Star Cinema; Regal Films
- Release date: December 25, 2013
- Running time: 105 minutes
- Country: Philippines
- Language: Filipino
- Box office: ₱182,750,969.00 (USD 3,899,200)

Pagpag: Siyam na Buhay (referred to as Pagpag: Nine Lives) is a 2013 Filipino supernatural horror film directed by Frasco S. Mortiz. The film was released on December 25, 2013, at the 39th Metro Manila Film Festival and stars Kathryn Bernardo, Daniel Padilla, Paulo Avelino and Shaina Magdayao. The film follows a group of teenagers that are terrorized by an evil spirit after they do not follow the Filipino superstition called "pagpag".

The film revolves around the traditional Filipino belief that one should never go home directly after visiting a wake since it risks bringing evil spirits or the deceased to one's home. The film grossed ₱188.7 million, becoming one of the highest-grossing Filipino horror films in history.

== Plot ==
Cedric and his friends Hannah, Ashley, Rico and Justin come upon the wake of Roman, husband of Lucy, which is arranged by undertaker Leni and her colleagues Dencio and Marcelo. At the wake, Marcelo sweeps the room when Eva, Lucy's older sister, scolds him as it is a bad superstition. All of the guests violate a superstition: Hannah drops tears on the coffin when she sees Cedric holding Leni's hand; Rico wipes the coffin with a handkerchief; Justin steals bread from the wake; Ashley looks at her reflection in the mirror; Cedric attends the wake with a wound; Dencio steals the money below the coffin and they all fail to do "pagpag," an act of dusting off oneself after a funeral to avoid being followed home by evil spirits.

At home, Leni's adopted brother Mac-Mac sees apparitions and draws nine figures with a number 8. Marcelo is killed by a malevolent entity while sweeping outside. Dencio blames Leni for not doing the pagpag and tells her that the spirit is coming back for the rest of them. He proceeds to tell her the story of how Roman died. Roman and Lucy once had a son, Emmanuel, who died. Roman made a pact with the Devil to bring back his son, but had to kill nine people in order to do so. After committing his sins, he found his son well and alive inside his coffin. One night, the people from the barrio tried to burn Roman's house down after learning of his pact, leading to his death and the disappearance of his son.

Meanwhile, a suicidal Hannah sees a shadow which she follows, thinking it is Cedric. To her horror, she receives a phone call from him, telling her that he is on his way there. Hannah panics and a demonic form gouges out her eyes and throws her into a swimming pool, killing her in front of Cedric, who is blamed for her death. Rico is killed when a spirit emerges from his handkerchief and throws him against a wall while in the shower. Cedric tells Justin and Ashley to burn the clothes they wore at the wake.

Cedric decides to go back to Lucy's house to talk to Eva. On the way, he rescues Leni, who is being chased by Roman's ghost in a market, and brings her along. Leni realizes they have the same goal and decide to team up.

The two find Roman's empty coffin. They search the house and see three human figures in the wall drawn in blood. Leni goes to find Mac-Mac in a church and Dencio, together with Eva, arrive to warn them and reveal that Mac-Mac is really Emmanuel, having rescued him during the fire to protect him from his parents. Eva tells Cedric and Leni that Roman's body is in their old house. In the church, Mac-Mac is trapped inside, while Eva is killed after being sucked inside a tomb. Meanwhile, at home, Ashley takes some selfies but sees that one of them has Roman's face. She is soon thrown to a mirror and falls down before being crushed by a falling chandelier. Justin, who witnesses her death and runs outside while calling Cedric, is fatally sandwiched by two trucks.

Dencio is trapped inside his car when he tries to save Mac-Mac in the church. The spirit taunts him as he tries to give back the money he stole. He rolls down the car window and tries to escape but is killed after he impales himself on shattered glass from the window. When Mac-Mac is able to escape, he sees the spirits of Roman's victims warning them that Cedric and Leni are both in danger. He then follows Roman's spirit on his way to the house.

When Cedric and Leni arrive at the old house, they realize that it was Lucy who sent her husband's spirit to kill the victims until he obtains nine lives for him to be resurrected. Mac-Mac rushes in to save them but is caught by Lucy, who threatens to kill him. Cedric and Leni tell Lucy the truth about Emmanuel. Roman tries to kill Leni and Cedric, but Lucy intervenes and is impaled by a girder. After Roman finally reanimates, he rushes to Lucy, who reveals to him that she was pregnant and that he had unwittingly killed their second child and explains to him that Emmanuel is still alive before she dies. Enraged, Roman attempts to kill Leni before being stabbed by Cedric.

In the aftermath, Cedric arrives in the hospital to visit Leni and Mac-Mac. They then see the ghosts of Lucy and Roman smiling at them as the film ends.

== Cast ==
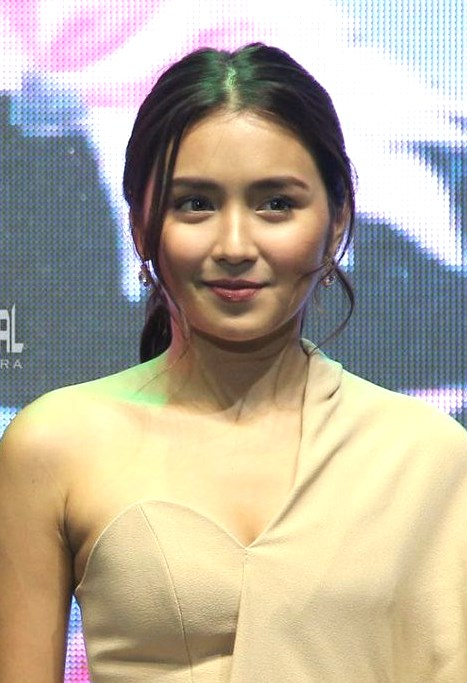
Kathryn Bernardo portrays Leni Dela Torre.

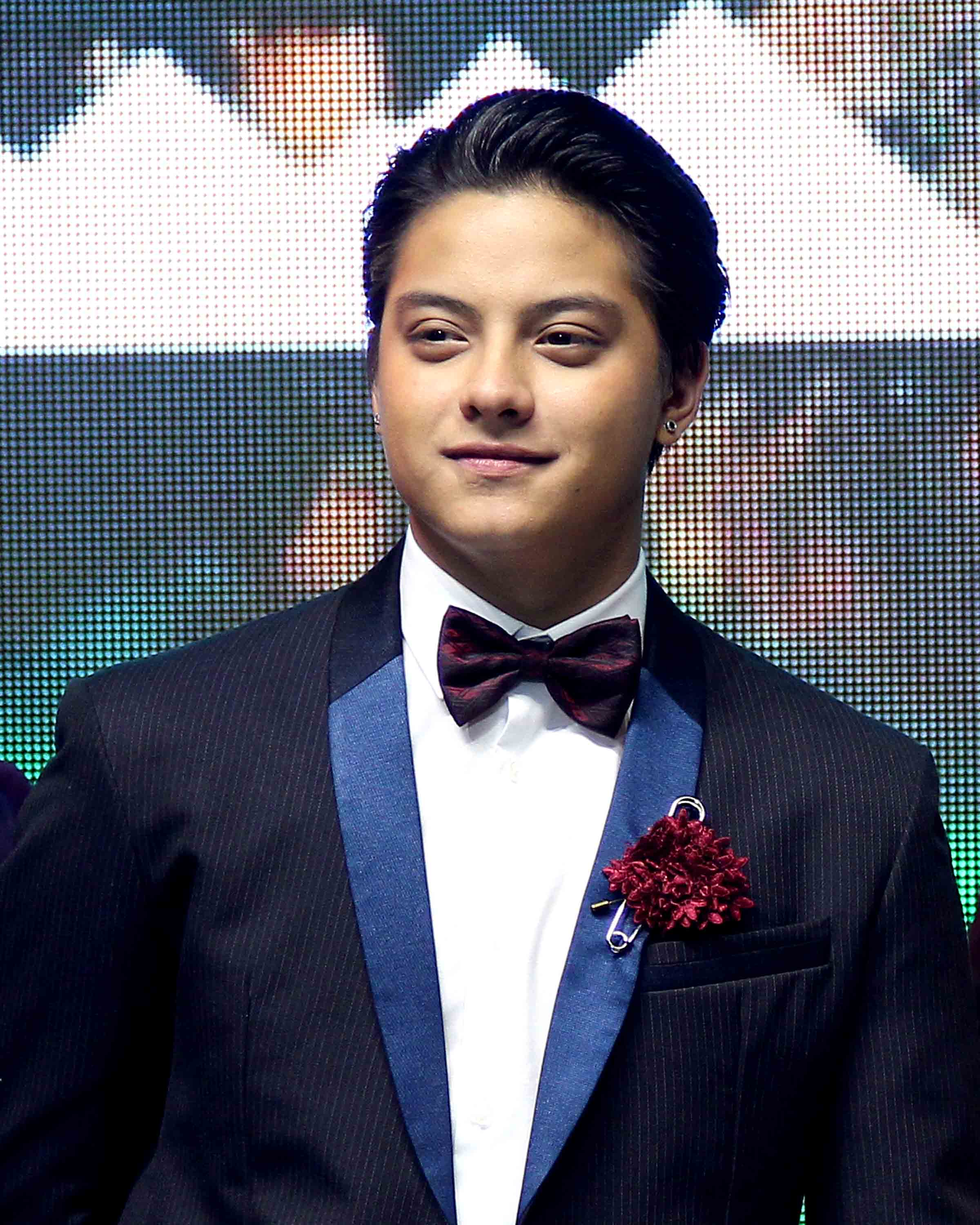
Daniel Padilla portrays Cedric Castillo.

Main cast

- Kathryn Bernardo as Leni Dela Torre
- Daniel Padilla as Cedric Castillo
- Paulo Avelino as Roman
- Shaina Magdayao as Lucy

Supporting cast

- Clarence Delgado as Mac-Mac / Emmanuel
- Matet de Leon as Eva
- Janus del Prado as Dencio
- CJ Navato as Justin
- Miles Ocampo as Ashley
- Dominic Roque as Rico
- Marlann Flores as Sheryll
- Michelle Vito as Hannah
- Marvin Yap as Marcelo
- Dominic Ochoa as Cedric's father
- Manuel Chua as SPO2 Manlajas
- Eric Nicolas as SPO4 Garcia
- Enchong Dee as Joseph Maurice
- Empress Schuck as Zarina
- Shamaine Buencamino as Evelyn

Guest cast

- Yves Flores as Bully
- Joe Vargas as Bully
- DM Sevilla as Bully
- Patrick Sugui as Bully
- Mosang as Ningning
- JD Baltazar as Cedric's friend

== Reception ==
=== Critical reception ===
Zig Marasigan of Rappler named the film as "‘Pagpag:' Stylish superstition" and added, "Although Pagpag does lack in scares, it does deliver on a handful of satisfying thrills that may be cheap but are thoroughly entertaining."

=== Box office gross ===
Pagpag: Siyam na Buhay grossed ₱23.7M on its first day of showing. At the end of its theatrical run, the film grossed ₱182,750,969, including ₱87,752,439 in Metro Manila, and ₱94,998,530 provincially.

== Accolades ==
Award Giving Body	Award	Recipient(s)	Result
39th Metro Manila Film Festival
39th Metro Manila Film Festival	Best Picture	Pagpag: Siyam Na Buhay	Nominated
39th Metro Manila Film Festival	Best Actor	Daniel Padilla	Nominated
39th Metro Manila Film Festival	Best Actress	Kathryn Bernardo	Nominated
39th Metro Manila Film Festival	Best Director	Frasco Santos Mortiz	Nominated
39th Metro Manila Film Festival	Best Supporting Actor	Janus Del Prado	Nominated
39th Metro Manila Film Festival	Best Supporting Actress	Shaina Magdayao	Nominated
39th Metro Manila Film Festival	Youth Choice Award	Pagpag: Siyam Na Buhay	Won
39th Metro Manila Film Festival	Best Festival Make-Up	Mountain Rock Productions & Leslie Lucero	Won
39th Metro Manila Film Festival	Best Visual Effects	Blackburst Inc.	Nominated
39th Metro Manila Film Festival	Best Child Performer	Clarence Delgado	Nominated
39th Metro Manila Film Festival	Best Sound Recording	Arnel Labayo	Nominated
39th Metro Manila Film Festival	Best Original Story	Joel Mercado	Nominated
39th Metro Manila Film Festival	Mavshack Male Star of the Night	Daniel Padilla	Won
2014 Young Critics Circle Awards	Best Film	Frasco Mortiz	Nominated
2014 Young Critics Circle Awards	Best Achievement Film Editing	Jerrold Tarog	Won
2014 Young Critics Circle Awards	Best Actor	Daniel Padilla	Nominated
2014 Famas Awards	Best Visual Effects	Blackburst Inc.	Won
2014 Famas Awards	Best Actor	Daniel Padilla	Nominated
2014 GMMSF Box-Office Entertainment Awards	Prince of Philippine Movies	Daniel Padilla	Won

== See also ==
- List of ghost films
- List of highest-grossing Filipino films in 2013
