= Scenema Concept International =

Philippine film studio

- Company type: Private
- Industry: Motion pictures
- Founded: June 1998
- Founders: Leo L. Villalon
- Headquarters: Pasig, Metro Manila, Philippines
- Key people: Maylyn Enriquez

Scenema Concept International is a Filipino film studio best known for its historical action films starring politician E.R. Ejercito. Existing since the early 2000s and based in Pasig, Metro Manila, Scenema began as a company which provided facilities and digital equipment to filmmakers and other clients.

In 2011, Scenema began producing feature films in partnership with Viva Films with its Metro Manila Film Festival (MMFF) entry Manila Kingpin: The Asiong Salonga Story, which won 11 of the festival's awards including Best Picture. The company's second feature film, El Presidente, was also submitted the next year as an entry to the MMFF, where it won 8 awards including Second Best Picture. Its last MMFF entry, Muslim Magnum .357, is a remake of a Fernando Poe Jr. film and was released in 2014.

Scenema has encountered controversy over the years. Tikoy Aguiluz, the director of Manila Kingpin, had his name removed from the film due to producers reediting the film without his permission. A planned feature film based on the Mamasapano clash in January 2015 was announced in February by actor E.R. Ejercito, though it entered development hell after receiving criticism for its potential to give a disrespectful treatment of the event. By 2021, Scenema is no longer involved with the film as a production company.

== Feature films ==
Release date	Title
December 25, 2011	Manila Kingpin: The Asiong Salonga Story
December 25, 2012	El Presidente: General Emilio Aguinaldo Story and the First Philippine Republic
December 18, 2013	Ang Maestra
December 25, 2013	Boy Golden: Shoot to Kill
April 2, 2014	Echoserang Frog
December 25, 2014	Muslim Magnum .357: To Serve and Protect
June 8, 2016	Pare Mahal Mo Raw Ako
