= My Little Bossings =

- Theatrical movie poster
- Directed by: Marlon N. Rivera
- Written by: Bibeth Orteza
- Produced by: Orly R. Ilacad; Antonio P. Tuviera; Marvic C. Sotto; Kristina Bernadette C. Aquino
- Starring: Vic Sotto; Kris Aquino; Ryzza Mae Dizon; Bimby Yap
- Cinematography: Lee Briones Meily
- Edited by: Vanessa de Leon<; Chrisel Desuasido
- Music by: Jessie Lasaten
- Production companies: OctoArts Films; M-Zet TV Productions, Inc.; APT Entertainment; K Productions
- Distributed by: GMA Pictures
- Release date: December 25, 2013
- Running time: 106 minutes
- Country: Philippines
- Languages: Filipino; English
- Box office: ₱375.9 million (US$7.4 million)

My Little Bossings (also known as Torky and My Little Bossings) is a 2013 Philippine comedy film directed by Marlon Rivera, starring Vic Sotto, Kris Aquino, Ryzza Mae Dizon, and Bimby Yap. An official entry for the 2013 Metro Manila Film Festival, the film released in theaters nationwide on December 25, 2013, and was produced by OctoArts Films, M-Zet Productions, APT Entertainment, and Kris Aquino Productions.

The film also marks Bimby Yap Jr.'s theatrical debut, and also the last film appearance of comedian Tado Jimenez, who died in a bus accident on February 7, 2014, at the age of 39.

The film broke box-office records in the Philippines upon its nationwide release in theaters, holding the highest opening day record of ₱50.5 million. It previously held the title of being the highest-grossing Filipino film of all time until it was broken by Girl, Boy, Bakla, Tomboy. Despite this, the film received generally negative reviews from critics, owing to its extensive use of product placement and lack of production value.

A sequel to the film was made, to which Sotto initially hinted in an interview, and was released in Christmas 2014 as one of the official entries for the 40th Metro Manila Film Festival.

== Plot ==
Torky is a bookkeeper working for Baba, a millionaire cash management specialist. Because of some conflict in her business that puts her life in danger, Baba entrusts the safety of her son Justin to Torky, who takes him home to meet his daughter Ice and Ching, the street urchin that the latter took under her wing. Given that Justin and Torky are not particularly fond of each other, how all four of them would get along under one roof becomes the focus of the story.

== Cast ==
=== Main cast ===
- Vic Sotto as Victor "Torky" Villanueva
- Kris Aquino as Barbara "Baba" Atienza
- Ryzza Mae Dizon as Ching
- Bimby Yap as Justin/Tintoy Atienza

=== Supporting cast ===
- Jaclyn Jose as Marga Atienza
- Aiza Seguerra as Ice Villanueva
- Jose Manalo as Parak
- Paolo Ballesteros as Alat
- Barbie Forteza as Rosy
- Neil Coleta as Dino
- Neil Ryan Sese as Jumbo
- Erika Padilla as Leni
- Lui Manansala as Sister Remy
- Nico Antonio as Bodgie

=== Special participation ===
- Gian Sotto as Police 1
- Wahoo Sotto as Police 2
- Jasper Visaya as Police 3
- Pauleen Luna as Paleng
- Roi Vinzon as Andy
- Tado Jimenez as Joker
- Jimmy Santos as Barangay Captain
- Joey de Leon as Agent Bryant (NBA/NBI)
- Oyo Sotto as Agent Kobe (NBA/NBI)
- Ruby Rodriguez as Janet Napulis
- Andrei Palabay as Bimby's friend

== Critical reception ==
Much of the criticism was directed at the film's plot and editing, citing lack of production value and its extensive and blatant use of product placement. The most negative reviews came from Rappler and ClickTheCity.com, each giving the film one out of five stars. Joseph Garcia of BusinessWorld called the film “one long commercial”, joking that the film is something to watch “if you’re looking to complete your grocery list and need a hint on what to buy.” Philbert Ortiz Dy of Click the City called the film “an insult”, criticizing the film's editing and also stating that it was “banking entirely on the presence of a couple of recognizable names.” A similarly critical review was made by Zig Marasigan of Rappler, also noting the intrusive use of product endorsements as “some of the most distasteful examples of local product placement while no effort is made to weave them into the narrative.” Television host Lourd de Veyra also stated his disappointment for the film in an open letter, lamenting that the film felt like it was “made in just three days”, and that “we never paid 220 pesos to watch the film for the actors to hawk instant pancit canton, bread, laundry detergent, cough syrup” and several other products endorsed by Kris Aquino and Vic Sotto.

A more positive review by Myra Grace Calulo of Philippine Entertainment Portal, however, saying that the film is “a family flick that sprinkled with gags and a lot of heart”, although she also noted the lack of character development and the story being “too drawn out at times”.

Sotto later addressed criticism of the film in a taped interview, stating “I’m open to all criticism, most especially if it's constructive. This is what we call democracy. I respect everyone's opinions. Just as how I respect the millions of viewers who were happy and amused at our film,” He later added, “What's important is it was a record-breaking festival.”

=== Box office ===
The film grossed ₱50.5 million on opening day, setting the highest record ever attained by a Filipino movie of all time.

The film has grossed some ₱350.9 million by January 4, 2014, setting the highest box office record gross ever attained by a Filipino movie of all time.

== Awards ==
Year	Award-Giving Body	Category	Recipient	Result
2013	Metro Manila Film Festival	Third Best Picture	My Little Bossings	Won
2013	Metro Manila Film Festival	Best Supporting Actress	Aiza Seguerra	Won
2013	Metro Manila Film Festival	Best Child Performer	Ryzza Mae Dizon	Won
2013	Metro Manila Film Festival	Best Original Theme Song	Jan K. Ilacad	Won
2014	GMMSF Box-Office Entertainment Awards	Most Popular Film Directors	Marlon Rivera (with Wenn Deramas)	Won
2014	GMMSF Box-Office Entertainment Awards	Phenomenal Stars	Vic Sotto (with Vice Ganda)	Won
2014	GMMSF Box-Office Entertainment Awards	Phenomenal Child Stars	Ryzza Mae Dizon and James "Bimby" Aquino-Yap	Won

== Sequel ==
Sotto initially hinted at a possible My Little Bossings sequel in a 2014 interview. While not much information has been released about the film at the tine, it was then later revealed that the sequel will be entitled My Bossing's Adventures and is a fantasy-adventure anthology film, with Sotto and Dizon reprising their roles. The film was released on December 25, 2014, as an official entry for the 2014 Metro Manila Film Festival.

== See also ==
- Mac and Me, a 1988 family film which received similar negative reception for extensive product placement
- List of films considered the worst
