= 2013 Metro Manila Film Festival =

Annual Philippine Festival edition

2013 Metro Manila Film Festival 39th Metro Manila Film Festival
- Awards: Gabi ng Parangal (lit. 'Awards Night')
- No. of films: 8
- Festival date: 25 December 2013 to 7 January 2014

MMFF chronology
- 40th ed. 38th ed.

The 39th Metro Manila Film Festival (MMFF), presented by the Metropolitan Manila Development Authority (MMDA), was held from 25 December 2013 to the first week of January 2014. No foreign films are shown in Philippine theaters (except IMAX theaters) to showcase locally produced films during the festival. For this year, eight film entries were chosen by the MMDA to be showcased in the festival. Unlike previous years, the Enteng Kabisote, Panday, and Shake, Rattle & Roll films were not presented for this year's festival.

10,000 Hours won the most awards with fourteen, including Best Actor for Robin Padilla, Best Director for Joyce Bernal, and Best Picture. Other winners included My Little Bossings with four awards, Girl, Boy, Bakla, Tomboy with three, and Pagpag: Siyam na Buhay and Boy Golden with one.

== Background ==
The 38th Metro Manila Film Festival held in 2012 became the highest earning MMFF to date with 767 million pesos, 21% higher than 2011. In a speech by Chairman Francis Tolentino of the Metropolitan Manila Development Authority or MMDA, an announcement was made on the creation of a new category, "Animation" under the "New Wave," which will be launched this year. He stated, "...With the growing talent of pool animators both locally and abroad, it is high time that we recognize and showcase their potential to a broader audience...". The Animahenasyon: Philippine Animation Festival will feature 5 animated films as a Prelude to be shown in theater 1 week ahead of the mainstream films. In line with the move, the MMFF has partnered with the Animation Council of the Philippines, the country's lead organization to promote the animation industry development. But in the press conference on the announcement of 8 official entries, Chairman Tolentino announced that the animation category will have to be postponed until the next festival. He also announced the creation of the MMFF Review Committee, which will assess and improve the film festival's rules, regulations, and implementing programs.

== Entries ==
=== Official entries ===
On 18 June 2013, the eight official entries were announced by MMDA Chairman Francis Tolentino, namely 10,000 Hours, Girl, Boy, Bakla, Tomboy, Kimmy Dora: Ang Kiyemeng Prequel, Pagpag, Pedro Calungsod: Batang Martir, My Super Kap, and My Little Bossings. Due to technical difficulties and other external factors, some entries dropped out of the competition, in which the MMDA committee picks from other entries, which failed to be shortlisted to replace the withdrawn entry.

Title	Starring	Studio	Director	Genre
10,000 Hours	Robin Padilla, Alden Richards, Bela Padilla, Mylene Dizon, Carla Humphries, Pen Medina, Joem Bascon, Michael de Mesa	Philippine Film Studios, N^{2} Productions & Viva Films	Joyce Bernal	Action, drama, thriller
Boy Golden	Jeorge Estregan, KC Concepcion	Viva Films & Scenema Concept International	Chito S. Roño	Action, drama
Girl, Boy, Bakla, Tomboy	Vice Ganda, Maricel Soriano, Joey Marquez, Ruffa Gutierrez, Cristine Reyes, JC de Vera, Ejay Falcon	Star Cinema & Viva Films	Wenn Deramas	Comedy
Kaleidoscope World	Sef Cadayona, Yassi Pressman	iAct Productions	Eliza Cornejo	Romance, dance film
Kimmy Dora: Ang Kiyemeng Prequel	Eugene Domingo, Sam Milby	Spring Films, MJM Productions & Quantum Films	Chris Martinez	Comedy, action
My Little Bossings	Vic Sotto, Kris Aquino, Ryzza Mae Dizon, James "Bimby" Aquino-Yap	OctoArts Films, M-Zet Productions, APT Entertainment & K Productions	Marlon Rivera	Comedy
Pagpag: Siyam na Buhay	Kathryn Bernardo, Daniel Padilla, Paulo Avelino, Shaina Magdayao	Star Cinema & Regal Entertainment	Frasco Mortiz	Horror, suspense, thriller
Pedro Calungsod: Batang Martir	Rocco Nacino, Christian Vasquez, Jestoni Alarcon, Robert Correa, Ryan Eigenmann, Victor Basa, Johan Santos	HPI Synergy Group & Wings Entertainment	Francis O. Villacorta	Biography, epic

Additional notes
- My Super Kap was withdrawn from the official list on 24 July 2013. Bong Revilla mentioned the conflicting schedules of the two of his cast members, Toni Gonzaga and Ai-Ai delas Alas as a reason for a foreseen delay of the film's special effects.
- Kulay Abo ang Langit was voted by the MMFF Screening Committee as replacement for My Super Kap on 2 August 2013. The film, which is technically No. 9 in the 15-picture line-up of MMFF finalists, has been retitled Pinoy Mutant Warriors by its producers. But due to significant changes from the original submitted film, Pinoy Mutant Warriors was not accepted.
- Boy Golden was picked as 7th official entry, replacing the withdrawn entry My Super Kap as well as rejected entry, Kulay Abo ang Langit.
- Be Careful with My Heart: The Movie was withdrawn from the official list on 12 September 2013. Tight schedule of the cast and crew of Be Careful with My Heart on shooting the ongoing series has been stated as the main reason.
- Kaleidoscope World was announced as the 8th official entry to the film festival on 25 September 2013, replacing Be Careful with My Heart.

=== New Wave entries ===
These films were screened from 18 to 24 December as a prelude to the MMFF.

Title	Starring	Studio	Director	Genre
Mga Anino ng Kahapon	Agot Isidro, TJ Trinidad, Carlo Cruz, Carl Acosta, Upeng Galang-Fernandez	Vim Yapan-Alem Chua Productions	Alvin Yapan	Drama
Dukit	Willy Layug, Raquel Villavicencio, Bor Ocampo, Bambalito Lacap, Thea Lelay, Rhea Lim, Mark Joseph Griswold, Grace Martinez	Centerstage Productions	Armando Lao	Drama
Island Dreams	Louise delos Reyes, Alexis Petitprez, Irma Adlawan, Chanel Latorre, Natasha Villaroman, Hector Macaso, Junar Vidal, Ronaldo Baxafra	Kenau Pictures Production	Aloy Adlawan, Gino M. Santos	Romance, comedy
Ang Maestra	Perla Bautista, Vaness del Moral, Jenine Desiderio, Dexter Doria, Mel Kimura, Lui Manansala	Pixel Works Enterprise, Scenema Concept International	Joven Tan	Drama
Saka-Saka	Ejay Falcon, Joseph Marco, Toby Alejar, Mon Confiado, Baron Geisler, Gigi Locsin	Cinebro	Toto Natividad	Action, drama

=== Student shorts ===
- Gapos - JMK De Guzman, Colegio de San Juan de Letran
- Hintayin Mo sa Seq. 24 - Jezreel Reyes and Jose Silvestre, Far Eastern University
- #No Filter - Luigi Lupe Rosario, Mapúa Institute of Technology

=== Animated films ===
- Gayuma ni Maria - Gabriel Villalon
- Kaleh and Mbaki - Dennis Sebastian
- Ang Lalong ni Kulakog - Omar Aguilar
- Mamang Pulis - Hannah Espia
- Origin of Mang Jose - Apollo Anonuevo

== Awards ==
2013 Metro Manila Film Festival Gabi ng Parangal
- Date: 27 December 2013
- Site: Meralco Theater, Pasig

Highlights
- Best Picture: 10,000 Hours
- Most awards: 10,000 Hours (14)

Television coverage
- Network: TV5

On 27 December 2013, the Metro Manila Film Festival Awards Night was held at Meralco Theater in Ortigas Center, Pasig. Winners are listed first and highlighted in boldface. The awards night was aired on TV5.

=== Major awards ===
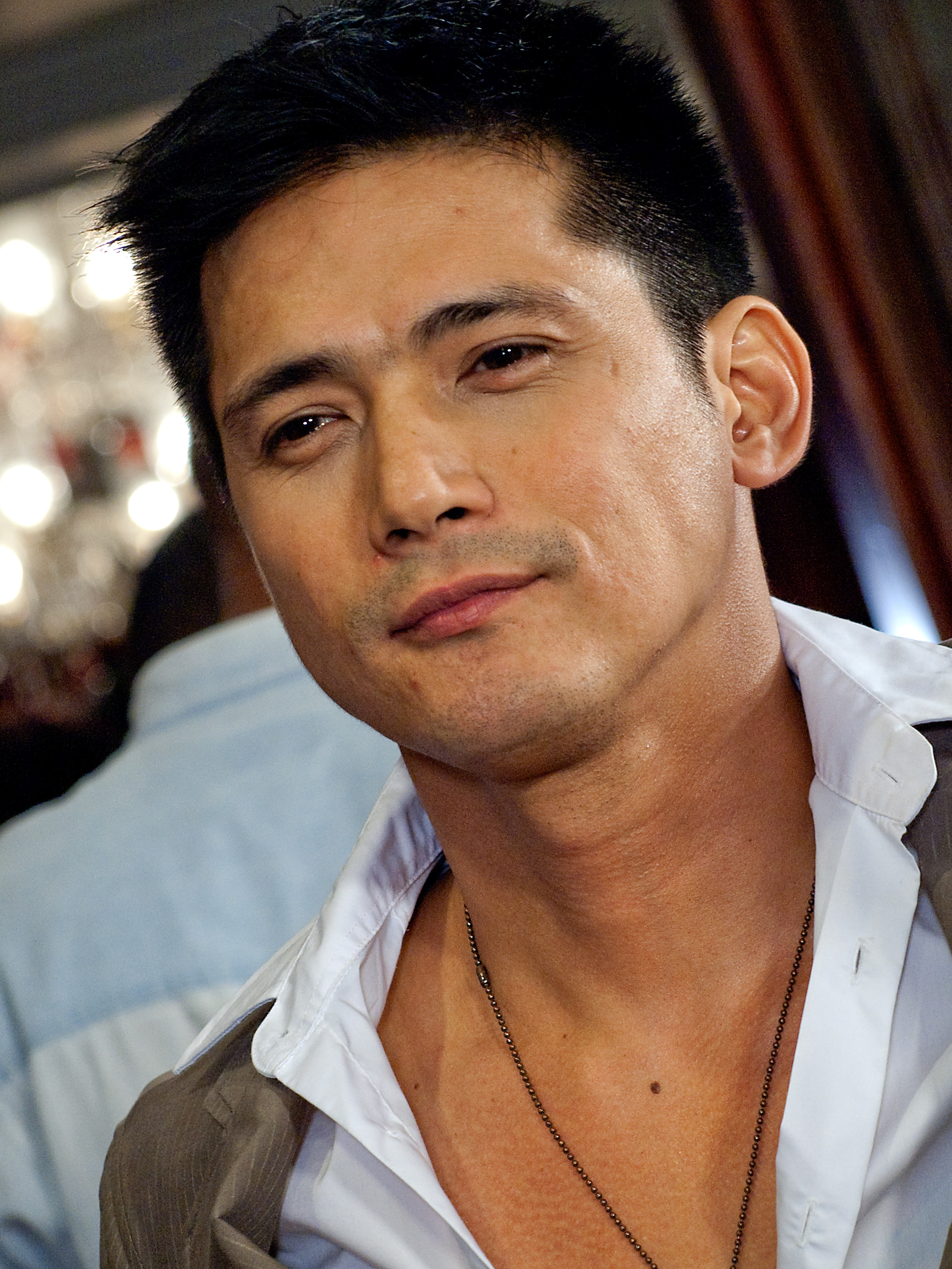
Robin Padilla, Best Actor winner

Best Picture	Best Director
**10,000 Hours – Philippine Film Studios, Inc. and Viva Films**; Girl, Boy, Bakla, Tomboy – Viva Films and Star Cinema (2nd Best Picture); My Little Bossings – OctoArts Films, M-Zet TV Productions, APT Entertainment, Inc., and K Productions (3rd Best Picture); Boy Golden – Scenema Concept International, Inc. and Viva Films; Kaleidoscope World – iACT Productions; Kimmy Dora: Ang Kiyemeng Prequel – Spring Films; Pagpag: Siyam na Buhay – ABS-CBN Film Productions, Inc. and Regal Entertainment, Inc.; Pedro Calungsod: Batang Martir – H.P.I. Synergy Group	**Joyce E. Bernal – 10,000 Hours**; Chito S. Roño – Boy Golden; Wenn V. Deramas – Girl, Boy, Bakla, Tomboy; Marlon Rivera – My Little Bossings; Frasco Mortiz – Pagpag: Siyam na Buhay
Best Actor	Best Actress
**Robin Padilla – 10,000 Hours as Gabriel Molino Alcaraz**; Vice Ganda – Girl, Boy, Bakla, Tomboy as Girlie, Peter, Mark Jill, and Panying Jackstone; Jeorge Estregan – Boy Golden as Arturo "Boy Golden" Porcuna; Vic Sotto – My Little Bossings as Victor "Torky" Villanueva; Daniel Padilla – Pagpag: Siyam na Buhay as Cedric; Rocco Nacino – Pedro Calungsod: Batang Martir as Pedro Calungsod	**Maricel Soriano – Girl, Boy, Bakla, Tomboy as Pia Jackstone**; KC Concepcion – Boy Golden as Marla "Marla Dy" De Guzman; Eugene Domingo – Kimmy Dora: Ang Kiyemeng Prequel as Kimmy and Dora Go Dong Hae; Kathryn Bernardo – Pagpag: Siyam na Buhay as Leni; Bela Padilla – 10,000 Hours as Maya Limchauco
Best Supporting Actor	Best Supporting Actress
**Pen Medina – 10,000 Hours as Sebastian Jago**; Baron Geisler – Boy Golden as Datu Putla; Janus del Prado – Pagpag: Siyam na Buhay as Dencio; Christian Vasquez – Pedro Calungsod: Batang Martir as Diego Luis de San Vitores; Michael de Mesa – 10,000 Hours as Dir. Dante Cristobal; Cholo Barretto – 10,000 Hours as Benjo Alcaraz	**Aiza Seguerra – My Little Bossings as Ice**; Gloria Sevilla – Boy Golden as Aling Puring; Shaina Magdayao – Pagpag: Siyam na Buhay as Lucy; Carla Humphries – 10,000 Hours as Isabelle Manahan; Mylene Dizon – 10,000 Hours as Anna Alcaraz
Gatpuno Antonio J. Villegas Cultural Award	Fernando Poe Jr. Memorial Award for Excellence
**10,000 Hours**	**10,000 Hours**
Best Screenplay	Best Original Story
**10,000 Hours – Ryllah Epifania Berica and Keiko Aquino**; Girl, Boy, Bakla, Tomboy – Mel Mendoza del Rosario; Kimmy Dora: Ang Kiyemeng Prequel – Chris Martinez; My Little Bossings – Bibeth Orteza	**10,000 Hours – Neil Arce, Peter Serrano, Bela Padilla and Joyce Bernal**; Girl, Boy, Bakla, Tomboy – Mel Mendoza del Rosario; My Little Bossings – Bibeth Orteza; Pagpag: Siyam na Buhay – Joel Mercado
Gender Sensitivity Award	Best Cinematography
**Girl, Boy, Bakla, Tomboy**	**10,000 Hours – Marissa Floirendo and Gilberto Vistan**; Boy Golden – Carlo Mendoza; Girl, Boy, Bakla, Tomboy – Sherman So; My Little Bossings – Lee Briones Meily
Best Editor	Best Production Design
**Marya Ignacio – 10,000 Hours**; Marya Ignacio – Girl, Boy, Bakla, Tomboy; Joyce Bernal – Kimmy Dora: Ang Kiyemeng Prequel; Jerrold Tarog – Pagpag: Siyam na Buhay	**10,000 Hours – Joey Luna**; Boy Golden – Fritz Silorio and Joel M. V. Bilbao; Girl, Boy, Bakla, Tomboy – Danilo Cristobas; Kimmy Dora: Ang Kiyemeng Prequel – Digo Ricio; Pedro Calungsod: Batang Martir – Art Nicdao
Best Visual Effects	Best Make-up Artist
**10,000 Hours – Central Digital**; Boy Golden – Mothership, Inc.; Girl, Boy, Bakla, Tomboy – Dodge Ledesma; Kimmy Dora: Ang Kiyemeng Prequel – Optima Digital; Pagpag: Siyam na Buhay – Blackburst, Inc.	**Mountain Rock Productions and Leslie Lucero – Pagpag: Siyam na Buhay**; Juvan Bermil, Virginia Apolinario, and Benny Batoctoy – Boy Golden; Edna Perida – Girl, Boy, Bakla, Tomboy; Alex "Bo" Vicencio – 10,000 Hours
Best Original Theme Song	Best Musical Scorer
**"My Little Bossings" from My Little Bossings – Jan K. Ilacad**; "Pahamak" from Kimmy Dora: Ang Kiyemeng Prequel – Yeng Constantino; "Awit ni Pedro" from Pedro Calungsod: Batang Martir – Francis O. Villacorta and Tonton Africa	**Teresa Barrozo – 10,000 Hours**; Vincent de Jesus – Girl, Boy, Bakla, Tomboy; Jessie Lasaten – My Little Bossings; Noel Espenida and Emlyn Oflindo Santos – Pedro Calungsod: Batang Martir
Best Sound Engineer	Best Child Performer
**Emmanuel Clemente – 10,000 Hours**; Albert Michael Idioma and Adiss Tabong – My Little Bossings; Arnel Labayo – Pagpag: Siyam na Buhay; Albert Michael Idioma – Pedro Calungsod: Batang Martir	**Ryzza Mae Dizon – My Little Bossings**
Youth Choice Award	Best Float
**Pagpag: Siyam na Buhay**	**Boy Golden**

=== New Wave category ===
==== Full-Length Category ====
Best Picture	Best Director
**Dukit – Armando Y. Lao**; Mga Anino ng Kahapon – Alemberg Ang; Island Dreams – Kenneth Au; Ang Maestra – Maylyn V. Enriquez; Saka Saka – Toto Natividad	**Armando Y. Lao – Dukit**; Alvin B. Yapan – Mga Anino ng Kahapon; Aloy Adlawan and Gino M. Santos – Island Dreams; Joven M. Tan – Ang Maestra; Toto Natividad – Saka Saka
Best Actor	Best Actress
**Wilfredo Layug, Bor Ocampo, and Bambalito Lacap** - **Dukit**	**Agot Isidro** - **Mga Anino ng Kahapon**
Most Gender Sensitivity Award	Special Jury Prize
**Island Dreams**	**Mga Anino ng Kahapon**

==== Other Awards ====
- New Wave Student Short Film Special Jury Prize - **#NoFilter**
- New Wave Student Short Film Most Gender-Sensitive Film - **Hintayin Mo sa Seq. 24**
- New Wave Animation Best Picture - **Kaleh and Mbaki**
- New Wave Animation Special Jury Prize - **Ang Lalong ni Kulakog**

== Multiple awards ==
=== Mainstream ===
Awards	Film
14	10,000 Hours
4	My Little Bossings
3	Girl, Boy, Bakla, Tomboy
2	Pagpag: Siyam na Buhay

=== New Wave ===
Awards	Film
3	Dukit
2	Mga Anino ng Kahapon

== Box Office gross ==
The Metropolitan Manila Development Authority was criticized for only releasing the official earnings of the Top 4 films.

Entry	Gross Ticket Sales	
Entry	25 December	7 January
My Little Bossings	₱ 50,400,000*	₱ 375,900,000*
Girl, Boy, Bakla, Tomboy	₱ 47,600,000	₱ 375,450,000
Pagpag: Siyam na Buhay	₱ 23,700,000	₱ 170,500,000
Kimmy Dora: Ang Kiyemeng Prequel	P 8,100,000	₱ 30,600,000
	TOTAL	₱ 999,302,000

Preceded by 2012 Metro Manila Film Festival	Metro Manila Film Festival; 2013	Succeeded by 2014 Metro Manila Film Festival
