= Girl, Boy, Bakla, Tomboy =

2013 Filipino comedy parody film

- Theatrical movie poster
- Directed by: Wenn V. Deramas
- Written by: Mel Mendoza-Del Rosario
- Produced by: Charo Santos-Concio; Malou N. Santos; Vic del Rosario Jr.
- Starring: Vice Ganda
- Cinematography: Sherman Philip So
- Edited by: Marya Ignacio
- Music by: Vincent de Jesus
- Production companies: ABS-CBN Film Productions, Inc.; Viva Films
- Distributed by: Star Cinema; Viva Films
- Release date: December 25, 2013
- Running time: 103 minutes
- Country: Philippines
- Language: Filipino
- Box office: ₱436 million (US$8.3 million)

Girl, Boy, Bakla, Tomboy (transl. Girl, Boy, Gay, Lesbian) is a 2013 Filipino comedy parody film produced by Star Cinema and Viva Films starring Vice Ganda in the title roles, alongside Maricel Soriano, Joey Marquez, Ruffa Gutierrez, JC de Vera, Ejay Falcon, Kiray Celis, Xyriel Manabat and Cristine Reyes in their supporting roles. It was one of the official entries of the 2013 Metro Manila Film Festival.

== Synopsis ==
After 25 years apart, quadruplets Girlie, a straight woman, Peter, a straight man, Mark, a gay man, and Panying, a lesbian, reunite when Peter requires a compatible liver donor after falling ill. Mark is the only compatible donor but sets a surprising condition: their father Pete (Joey Marquez) and Girlie must endure the struggles he, Panying, and their mother Pia (Maricel Soriano) have faced. However, Mark's hope to heal their fractured family is threatened when Pete's fiancée Marie (Ruffa Gutierrez) schemes to keep him and Pia apart. Will this unconventional family overcome their differences and find a way back to each other?

== Cast and characters ==
=== Main cast ===
- Vice Ganda as the Jackstone quadruplets:
  - Marklyn Monroe "Girlie" Jackstone
  - Peter Jackstone Jr.
  - Mark Jill Jackstone
  - Pattie "Panying" Jackstone

=== Supporting cast ===
- Maricel Soriano as Pia Jackstone, the biological mother of the Jackstone quadruplets and Snow White, Cindy, Bella, and Ariel's adoptive parents
- Joey Marquez as Peter "Pete" Jackstone, the biological father of the Jackstone quadruplets and Cindy, Bella, and Ariel's adoptive parents
- Ruffa Gutierrez as Marie, Pete's fiancée
- Cristine Reyes as Liza, Panying's girlfriend
- JC de Vera as Osweng, Mark's boyfriend
- Ejay Falcon as Harry, Girlie's boyfriend
- Kiray Celis as Snow White, Pia's adopted daughter
- Xyriel Manabat as Cindy, Pia's adopted daughter
- Rhed Bustamante as Bella, Pia's adopted daughter
- JM Ibañez as Ariel, Pia's adopted son
- Angelu de Leon as Jill, Pia's lesbian sister
- Bobby Andrews as Jack, Pia's gay brother
- Joy Viado as Lola Amparo Jackstone, Pete's mother and the quadruplets' grandmother
- Frank Garcia as Dave
- Dante Ponce as Doctor
- Jelson Bay as Janitor
- Cecil Paz as Sales Lady
- Eagle Riggs
- Lassy Marquez as Waiter
- MC Calaquian as Waiter
- Flora Gasser as Manang
- Atak as Bar Manager
- Ryan Bang as Jun Pyo
- Rubi Rubi as Crazy Patient/Doctor
  - also participated as the double of the quadruplets.

=== Special participation ===
- Karylle as Peter's girlfriend (cameo role)
- Luis Manzano as the priest (cameo role)
- Pia Moran as herself
- Ryan Bang as Jun Pyo
- Johan Santos
- Donnalyn Bartolome as a Starmobile saleslady (cameo role)

== Awards ==
Award	Category	Recipient	Result
2014 Philippine Movie Press Club Star Awards for Movies (PMPC)	Movie Actor Of The Year	Vice Ganda	Won
39th Metro Manila Film Festival	Best Actress	Maricel Soriano	Won
39th Metro Manila Film Festival	Best Actor	Vice Ganda	Nominated
39th Metro Manila Film Festival	Best Director	Wenn Deramas	Nominated
39th Metro Manila Film Festival	2nd Best Picture	Girl, Boy, Bakla, Tomboy	Won
39th Metro Manila Film Festival	Gender Sensitivity	Girl, Boy, Bakla, Tomboy	Won
2014 GMMSF Box-Office Entertainment Awards	Film Actress of the Year	Maricel Soriano	Won
2014 GMMSF Box-Office Entertainment Awards	Phenomenal Stars	Vice Ganda (with Vic Sotto)	Won
