= Boy Golden: Shoot to Kill =

Boy Golden
- Theatrical release poster
- Directed by: Chito S. Roño
- Screenplay by: Catherine O. Camarillo; Guelan Varela-Luarca
- Story by: Catherine Camarillo; Jeorge "E.R." Estregan
- Based on: The Life Story of Arturo "Boy Golden" Porcuna
- Produced by: Leonard Villalon; Maylyn Villalon-Enriquez
- Starring: Jeorge "E.R." Estregan; KC Concepcion
- Cinematography: Carlo Mendoza
- Edited by: Carlo Francisco Manatad; Jason Cahapay; Ryan Orduña
- Music by: Carmina Cuya
- Production company: Scenema Concept International
- Distributed by: Viva Films
- Release date: December 25, 2013
- Running time: 131 minutes
- Country: Philippines
- Language: Filipino

Boy Golden (marketed as Boy Golden: Shoot to Kill – The Arturo Porcuna Story) is a 2013 Philippine biographical crime film loosely based on the life of Arturo Porcuna who rises through the Manila underworld in the 1960s until his murder. Produced by Scenema Concept International, it was released on December 25, 2013 as an official entry to the 39th Metro Manila Film Festival.

== Cast ==
=== Main cast ===
- Jeorge "E.R." Estregan as Arturo "Boy Golden" Porcuna
- KC Concepcion as Marla "Marla Dy" De Guzman

=== Supporting cast ===
- Eddie Garcia as Atty. Dante Sagalongos
  - Don Umali as Atty. Sagalongos (40 yrs.)
  - Roel Catalan as Atty. Sagalongos (14 yrs.)
  - Julio Pisk as Atty. Sagalongos (5 yrs.)
- Tonton Gutierrez as Col. Rey Maristela
- John Estrada as Tony Razon
- Gloria Sevilla as Aling Puring
  - Camille Ybanez as young Puring (16 yrs.)
  - Stephanie Sulit as young Puring (7 yrs.)
- Leo Martinez as Mr. Ho
- Jhong Hilario as Guido Perez
- Baron Geisler as Datu Putla
- Joem Bascon as a gangster in the film's opening
- Roi Vinzon as Alias Tekla
- John Lapuz as Cabaret Manager
- Mon Confiado as Rachel Viego
- Dick Israel as Boy Bungal
- Buboy Villar as teenager
- Dindo Arroyo as Maning Pusa
- Deborah Sun as nanny
- Simon Ibarra as Razon's henchman
- Gerald Ejercito
- Dexter Doria
- DJ Durano as Entong Intsik
- Marc Abaya
- Roldan Aquino as Don Ricardo de Montiel
- Mathew Barrios as Atty. Eduardo Andrade
- Paolo Serrano as Totoy Balantik
- Bembol Roco as Frederico delos Reyes
- Lloyd Samartino
- Brandon Gepfer as Randy
- Prapimporn Karnchanda as Nanette
- Gerhard Acao

== Accolades ==
Year	Award-giving body	Category	Recipient	Result
2013	Metro Manila Film Festival	Best Float	Boy Golden	Won
