= List of Daniel Padilla concert tours =

Daniel Padilla is a Filipino actor and recording artist. He have hold three major concert in Philippines. The first headlining concert title, Daniel: Live!, served as his birthday concert, was held on April 30, 2013. In 2014, Padilla continued his concert streak with Dos: The Daniel Padilla Concert as he rocked the Araneta Coliseum once again on April 30. Seeking for further challenge, by 2015, the actor-singer brought his music and artistry for the first time at the Mall of Asia Arena with Most Wanted. Apart from changing the venue, the concert likewise saw a change in its date as it happened not on Daniel's birthday month but on June 13. In addition to his own headlining concert, he hold multi national tours with Yeng Constantino in April 2014. Daniel Padilla was also part of the G! Kapamilya Tour in March 2023, along with Kathryn Bernardo , Zanjoe Marudo and Joshua Garcia which had stops in Barcelona, Milan, and Abu Dhabi. In September 2025, he started US tours with Ian Veneracion, together headlining 2025 DETOUR concerts in US States; Hawaii, California,Texas and Alaska.

As part from his musical career, he also involved on the One Magical Night US and Canada Tours (2018). In addition Padilla also performed on ASAP Live in New York in 2016,ASAP Live in Honolulu in 2018 and made line-up appearances at "London Barrio Fiesta" in 2014 and 2025. He will be joining in ASAP Live in Vancouver in October 2025.

== Headlining concert ==
Year	Title	Duration	Shows
2013	Daniel: Live!	April 30, 2013	1
Daniel: Live! is Daniel Padilla's first sold out headlining concert served as his birthday concert, was held on April 30, 2013. The concert featured Arnel Pineda, Yeng Constantino, Vice Ganda, Star Magic fellow artists including the 2013 batch, his own band Parking 5, and Kathryn Bernardo as his special guests
2011	DOS: The Daniel Padilla Concert at the Big Dome	April 30, 2014 (Japan)	1
Dos: The Daniel Padilla Concert second sold out headlining concert served as his birthday concert, was held on April 30, 2013. Among his guests at his sold-out concert were OPM rock icon Rico Blanco, Toni Gonzaga, Richard Yap, his own band Parking 5, The REO Brothers of Tacloban and Kathryn Bernardo. The concert was the first to be streamed live via Sky Cable's pay per view services in Metro Manila, Laguna, Rizal, Bacolod, Dumaguete, at General Santos City.
2013	Daniel Padilla Rocks with Yeng Constantino	April 10, 2014 (United Arab Emirates); April 11, 2014 (United Kingdom); April 12, 2014 (Rome); April 20, 2014 (Italy)	4
Daniel Padilla Rocks with Yeng Constantino is multi national tour of Padilla and Yeng Constantino
2015	Most Wanted	June 13, 2015	1
Most Wanted is Daniel Padilla's third solo concert, as support of his third full-length studio album, I Feel Good. The concert, held on June 13, 2015, was Padilla's first concert at the SM MoA Arena. Touted as his most special concert, Most Wanted saw the performance of the best of the best in the industry namely Gary Valenciano, Edgar Allan Guzman, Nyoy Volante, KZ Tandingan, Morissette, Harana, Kyla and Kathryn Bernardo. Unlike the previous concert, only streamed live via Sky Cable's pay per view services, the concert also streamed live in the cinemas of malls in Davao, Cebu, Iloilo, Cabanatuan, Pampanga, and Legazpi and also could be played during a limited period from ABS-CBNmobile-powered mobile devices.
2017	DJ Classics: Back at the Araneta	October	1
DJ Classics is Daniel Padilla's fourth solo concert. Star Music head Roxy Liquigan on November 27, 2016 confirmed that Padilla will hold a major concert. The singer was originally scheduled to perform his major concert at the Big Dome in February 2017. But in one episode of "Tonight with Boy Abunda" Padilla revealed that he has no time to prepare himself because he was busy working on the ABS-CBN soap opera Pangako Sa 'Yo and the Star Cinema drama Barcelona: A Love Untold.

== See also ==
- Daniel Padilla discography
- Daniel Padilla filmography
- Daniel Padilla videography
- List of awards and nominations received by Daniel Padilla
