= Daniel Padilla discography =

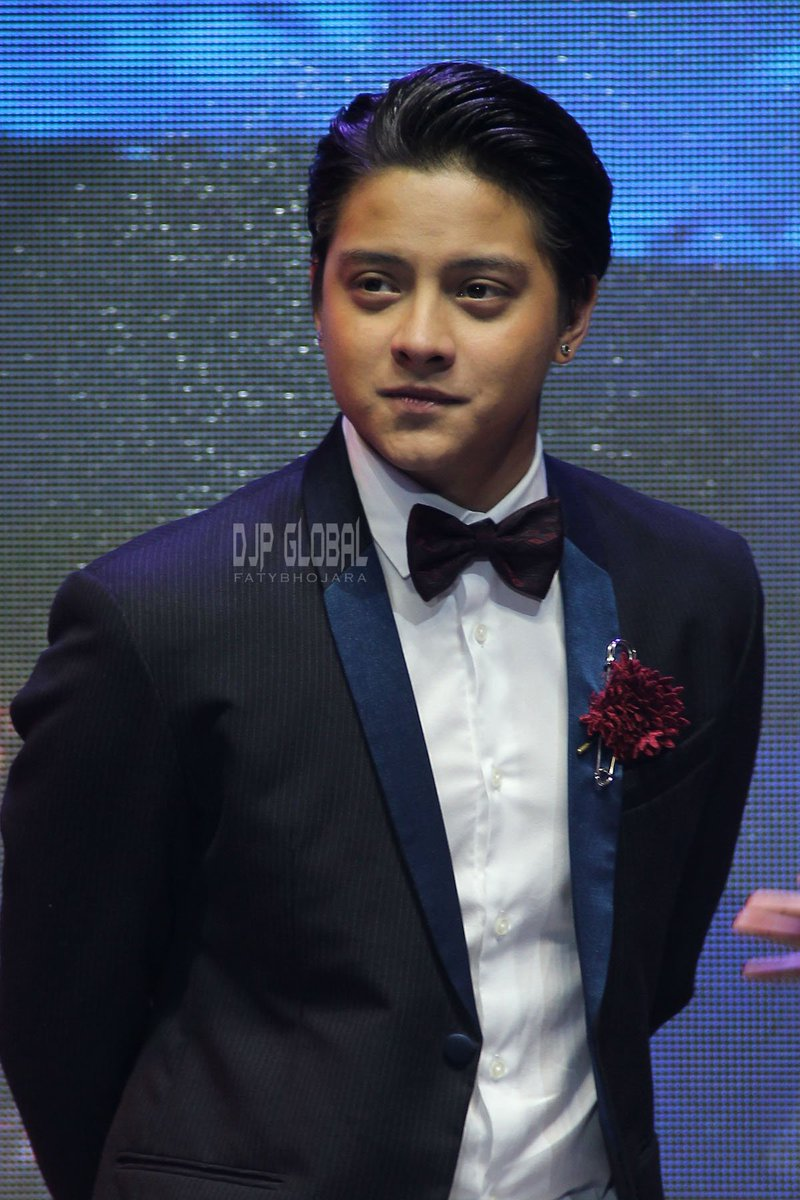
- Padilla at the Celebrate Mega in Iceland 2016.
- Studio albums: 3
- EPs: 1
- Soundtrack albums: 7
- Compilation albums: 1
- Singles: 29
- Music videos: 4
- Guest singles: 9

This is the discography of Filipino singer and actor Daniel Padilla, produced by Rox Santos and managed by Star Records. He has released three studio albums, one extended play, and one compilation album. He also contributed in a total of nine guest singles and seven soundtracks.

His debut album DJP won Best Selling Album of the Year in Awit Awards for two consecutive years in 2013 & 2014 with 40,00 copies sold, hence making it the highest-selling album of his career. His mini album Daniel Padilla, second studio album I Heart You; certified double platinum by PARI, while his third studio album I Feel Good certified gold. In December 2016 Padilla released his first compilation album, DJ Greatest Hits.

== Studio albums ==
List of studio albums, with selected chart positions, sales figures and certifications
Title	Album details	Peak chart positions	Sales	Certifications
DJP	Released Digital: April 11, 2013; Released CD: April 16, 2013; Label: Star Music; Formats: CD, digital download	1	PHL: 30,000	PARI: 2× Platinum; Received: September 26, 2013
I Heart You	Released: April 14, 2014; Re-released: I Heart You (Deluxe Platinum Edition); Released: 2016; Label: Star Music; Formats: CD, Digital download	1	PHL: 30,000	PARI: 2× Platinum; Received: April 17, 2015
I Feel Good	Released Digital: June 7, 2015; Released CD: June 13, 2015; Label: Star Music; Formats: CD, Digital download	1	PHL: 7,500	PARI: Gold; Received: June 26, 2015

== Extended plays ==
List of studio albums, with selected chart positions, sales figures and certifications
Title	Album details	Peak chart positions	Sales	Certifications
Daniel Padilla	Released: May 28, 2012; Label: Star Music; Formats: CD, Digital download	1	30,000	PARI: 2× Platinum; Received: March 14, 2013

== Compilation albums ==
List of compilation albums, with selected chart positions, sales figures and certifications
Title	Album details	Peak chart positions	Sales	Certifications
DJ Greatest Hits	Released: December 19, 2016; Label: Star Music; Formats: CD, Digital download	—	7,000	
"—" not charted.

== Duet/collaborative albums ==
List of collaborative albums, with selected chart positions, sales figures and certifications
Title	Album details	Peak chart positions	Sales	Certifications
Christmas Love Duets	With: Kathryn Bernardo; Released: December 18, 2015; Label: Star Music; Formats: CD, Digital download	1	6,000	

== Singles ==
List of singles as lead artist, with selected chart positions and certifications, showing released date and album name
Title	Released date	Album
"Hinahanap-Hanap Kita"	April 20, 2012	Daniel Padilla
"Prinsesa"	August 24, 2012	Daniel Padilla
"Ako'y Sa'Yo, Ika'y Akin"	October 25, 2012	Daniel Padilla
"Nasa Iyo Na ang Lahat"	January 11, 2013	Himig Handog P-Pop Love Songs (2013)
"Kumusta Ka"	March 18, 2013	DJP
"Unlimited and Free"	January 1, 2014	Non-album single
"I Heart You"	April 1, 2014	I Heart You
"Pinasmile" (with Kathryn Bernardo)	April 4, 2014	Non-album single
"Simpleng Tulad Mo"	August 15, 2014	Himig Handog P-Pop Love Songs (2014)
"Pangako Sa’Yo"	December 22, 2014	Non-album single
"So Real So Good" (with Kathryn Bernardo)	January 1, 2015	Non-album single
"I Got You (I Feel Good)"	June 7, 2015	I Feel Good
"Knocks Me off My Feet"	January 1, 2015	I Feel Good
Isn't She Lovely	June 14, 2015	I Feel Good
"Ikaw ang Aking Mahal"	July 14, 2015	I Feel Good
"Reyna ng Puso Ko"	January 11, 2016	DJ Greatest Hits
"Basta Ikaw"	January 11, 2016	DJ Greatest Hits
"Share the Love" (with Kathryn Bernardo, Elmo Janella Salvador and Elmo Magalona)		Non-album single
"Mabagal" (with Moira Dela Torre)	August 30, 2019	Himig Handog 2019

== Soundtrack contribution ==
Year	Released date	Title	Track	Artist
2012	January 1	Love Songs from Princess and I	"Hinahanap-hanap Kita"	Daniel Padilla
2012	January 1	Love Songs from Princess and I	"Gusto Kita"	Daniel Padilla, Enrique Gil & Khalil Ramos
2012		24/7 In Love	"Hinahanap-hanap Kita"	Daniel Padilla
2013	December 10	Got to Believe (OST)	"Kasama Kang Tumanda"	Daniel Padilla
2013	December 10	Got to Believe (OST)	"Kahit Maputi Na Ang Buhok Ko"	Daniel Padilla
2013	December 10	Got to Believe (OST)	"Got to Believe in Magic"	Daniel Padilla & Kathryn Bernardo
2016	January 1	Crazy Beautiful You OST	"Nothing's Gonna Stop Us Now"	Daniel Padilla & Morissette
2016	December 16	Vince & Kath & James	"Simpleng Tulad Mo"	Daniel Padilla
2017	April 10	Can't Help Falling in Love (OST)	"Can't Help Falling in Love"	Daniel Padilla
2017	December 15	Gandarrapiddo: The Revenger Squad (OST)	"Maging Superhero"	Daniel Padilla

== Guest appearances ==
List of non-single guest appearances, with other performing artists, showing year released and album name
Title	Released	Other artist(s)	Album
3. "Pinasmile" (with Kathryn Bernardo); 7. "I Heart You"; 13. Nasa Iyo Na Ang Lahat"	2015	Various Artist	Best of ABS-CBN Summer Songs
"OPM Dance Suite"	January 1, 2014	ABS-CBN Philharmonic Orchestra	Decades of OPM
10. "Got to Believe in Magic"; 11. "PinaSmile"	January 1, 2014	Kathryn Bernardo	Kathryn
11. "Nothings Gonna Stop Us Now"	January 01, 2015	Morissette	Morissette

== Promotional singles ==
List of promotional singles, showing year released and album name
Title	Released	Other artist(s)	Album
"Lumiliwanag ang Mundo sa Kwento ng Pasko"	2012	Various Artist	Non-album singles
"My Only Radio"	2012	with Toni Gonzaga & Vice Ganda	Non-album singles
"Thank You For The Love"	2015	with Kathryn Bernardo, Enrique Gil, Liza Soberano, James Reid, Nadine Lustre, Bamboo Mañalac, and Elha Nympha	Non-album singles
"Salamat - 2016"	2016	Star Music All Stars	Non-album singles
