= DJ Greatest Hits =

Compilation album by Daniel Padilla
- Released: December 19, 2016
- Genres: Pop, pop rock, Folk, World, Country, OPM
- Length: 65:15
- Languages: Tagalog, English
- Label: Star Music
- Producer: Roque "Rox" B. Santos

Singles from DJ Greatest Hits
- 1. ""Reyna Ng Puso Ko"" Released: January 11, 2016; 2. ""Basta Ikaw"" Released: January 11, 2016

Music Videos
- "Reyna Ng Puso Ko" (Lyric) on YouTube
- "Basta Ikaw" (Lyric) on YouTube

DJ Greatest Hits is the first compilation album of Filipino actor and singer Daniel Padilla under Star Records, released on December 19, 2016 in the Philippines. This album consist of eighteen songs; sixteen songs from his all-time hits since he started his music career, and two new songs "Reyna Ng Puso Ko", and "Basta Ikaw".

From his debut-self-titled-album Daniel Padilla there is Hinahanap-Hanap Kita, Ako'y Sa'yo, Ika'y Akin Lamang, Prinsesa, From his debut album, DJP; Nasa Iyo Na Ang Lahat, Kumusta Ka, Sabay Natin, Binibini, Naaalala. From his third studio album there is I Heart You and With A Smile. This album also included soundtrack contribution for his movie Crazy Beautiful You, Nothing's Gonna Stop Us Now featuring Morissette Amon, "Pangako Sa ‘Yo," the theme song of his teleserye with Kathryn Bernardo, Walang Iba, as well as the chart-topper "Simpleng Tulad Mo". It also featured his latest title track from the fourth album I Feel Good, "I Got You (I Feel Good)" and his single Unlimited And Free.

== Background and development ==
Star Music on December 18, 2016 revealed this album released on iTunes

== Promotion and reception ==
On Wednesday, January 11, Star Music officially launched "Reyna Ng Puso Ko" and "Basta Ikaw" on MOR 101.9, via the program Heartbeats.

== Track listing ==
No.	Title	Lyrics	Music	Length
1.	"Hinahanap-Hanap Kita"			4:02
2.	"Ako'y Sa'yo, Ika'y Akin Lamang"			5:12
3.	"Prinsesa"			4:44
4.	"Nasa Iyo Na Ang Lahat"			3:30
5.	"Kumusta Ka"			3:01
6.	"Sabay Natin"			3:31
7.	"Binibini"			3:57
8.	"Naaalala"			3:57
9.	"I Heart You"	Nathan Concepcion	Nathan Concepcion	2:57
10.	"With A Smile"			4:10
11.	"Nothing's Gonna Stop Us Now" (feat. Morissette Amon)	Albert Hammond and Diane Warren		4:19
12.	"Walang Iba"			4:32
13.	"Pangako Sa ‘Yo"			3:16
14.	"Simpleng Tulad Mo"	Jungee Marcelo	Jungee Marcelo	3:45
15.	"I Got You (I Feel Good)"	James Brown	James Brown	2:50
16.	"Unlimited And Free"			2:28
17.	"Reyna Ng Puso Ko"	Jungee Marcelo	Jungee Marcelo	4:13
18.	"Basta Ikaw"	Nica del Rosario	Rox Santos	3:44
Total length:				65:15

== Personnel ==
- Malou N. Santos & Roxy Liquigan – Executive Producers
- Roque 'Rox' B. Santos – Over-all Album Producer
- Jonathan Manalo – A&R/Audio Content Head
- Jayson Sarmiento – Promo Supervisor
- Jholina Luspo – Promo Specialist
- London Angeles – Promo Associate
- Mella Ballano & Ron Care – Promo Coordinators
- Marivic Benedicto – Star Song, inc and New Media Head
- Beth Faustio – Music Publishing Officer
- Luisa Ponceca – Music Publishing Specialist
- Eaizen Almazan – New Media Technical Assistant
- Abbey Aledo – Music Servicing Officer
- Milette Quizon – Sales and Distribution
- Christine L. Cheng – Design and Layout
- Andrew Castillo – Creative Head
- Dante Tonedo - Album Master

== Release history ==
Country	Format	Release date	Label
Philippines	CD, digital download	December 19, 2016	Star Music
