= Daniel: Live! =

2013 concert by Daniel Padilla

- Philippines concert by Daniel Padilla
- Promotion poster for Daniel: Live!
- Associated album: Daniel Padilla
- Start date: 30 April 2013

Daniel Padilla concert chronology
- Daniel: Live! (2013); DOS (2013)

Daniel: Live! is the first concert by Filipino actor and singer Daniel Padilla, the concert is the way Padilla thanking fans for the support to his first self-titled album, Daniel Padilla, successful TV series Princess and I, and served as his birthday concert. The set list includes covers of Eraserheads' songs, mash ups of The Beatles' songs, his hit single "Nasa Iyo Na Ang Lahat", "Prinsesa" and "Hinahanap-Hanap Kita" as well as another songs from his album.

== Concerts ==
On April 19, 2013 Padilla hold his birthday concert conference with media and blog, he revealed will unleash the 'old school rocker' side of him. Daniel: Live! held in Manila on April 30, 2013 at the Smart Araneta Coliseum. The concert featured Arnel Pineda, Yeng Constantino and Vice Ganda. Padilla's own band, Parking 5, of which his brother, Jose Carlito, is the lead singer and he the bassist. As well as Star Magic fellow artists including the 2013 batch, Khalil Ramos and his love team partner Kathryn Bernardo.

Padilla open the concert by sang Queen's “We Will Rock You,” continued with “Ligaya,” “Ang Huling El Bimbo” and “Kumusta Ka.” After the first set, Daniel introduced his first guests, Arnel Pineda, who sang “I Don’t Want to Miss a Thing.” Next Padilla performed “Binibini,” “Sisikat Din Ako,” “Yugyugan Na,” “With or Without You,” and “Mr. Suave,” with his band Parking 5. He jammed on “Awit ng Kabataan" with his third guest, Yeng Constantino and joined the boys and girls of Star Magic 2013 in a medley of hits from the Beatles, like “Come Together,” "She Loves You", "Ticket to Ride" and “Drive My Car.”

When Padilla sang “Ako’y sa ’Yo, Ika’y Akin”, Bernardo came up the stage, then Vice Ganda joined them. During the last ment with Kathryn and Vice, Daniel Padilla vowed never to sing or dance like Justin Bieber but that night he did Dougie, Harlem Shake, and danced to Psy’s “Gentleman”. After Ganda left, Padilla sang "Nasa Iyo Na Ang Lahat" to Bernardo. With a burst of fireworks and confetti, Daniel closed the show with his version of Rivermaya's “Hinahanap-hanap Kita.”

== In media ==
This is the first major concert that was streamed live via Sky Cable's pay per view services in Philippines.

== Set list ==
Setlist

Daniel Intro

- "We Will Rock You"
- "Ligaya"
- “Ang Huling El Bimbo”
- “Kumusta Ka.”

First MENT (Daniel introduced his guests, Arnel Pineda)

- “I Don’t Want to Miss a Thing” (Arnel Pineda)
- “Binibini”
- “Sisikat Din Ako”
- “Yugyugan Na”
- “With or Without You”
- “Mr. Suave” (with Matt, RJ and JC, He jammed)
- “Awit ng Kabataan”(with Yeng Constantino)

Daniel played bass for his band Parking 5

- Medley hits from the Beatles “Come Together,” “She Loves You,” “Ticket to Ride” and “Drive My Car.” (with Star Magic 2013)
- “Mr. Brightside”
- “Ako’y sa ’Yo, Ika’y Akin” (with Kathryn Bernardo)

LAST MENT with Kathryn Bernardo and Vice Ganda

- “Nasa Iyo na ang Lahat”
- “Hinahanap-hanap Kita.”

== Concert dates ==
Date	City	Country	Venue	Attendance
April 30, 2013	Quezon City	Philippines	Smart Araneta Coliseum	Sold Out

== Guest ==
Date	Guest
April 30, 2013	Arnel Pineda, Parking 5, Yeng Constantino, Star Magic 2013, Vice Ganda, Kathryn Bernardo

== Personnel ==
- Artists: Daniel Padilla
- Tour organizer: Star Records
- Tour promoter: ABS-CBN
