= Daniel Padilla filmography =

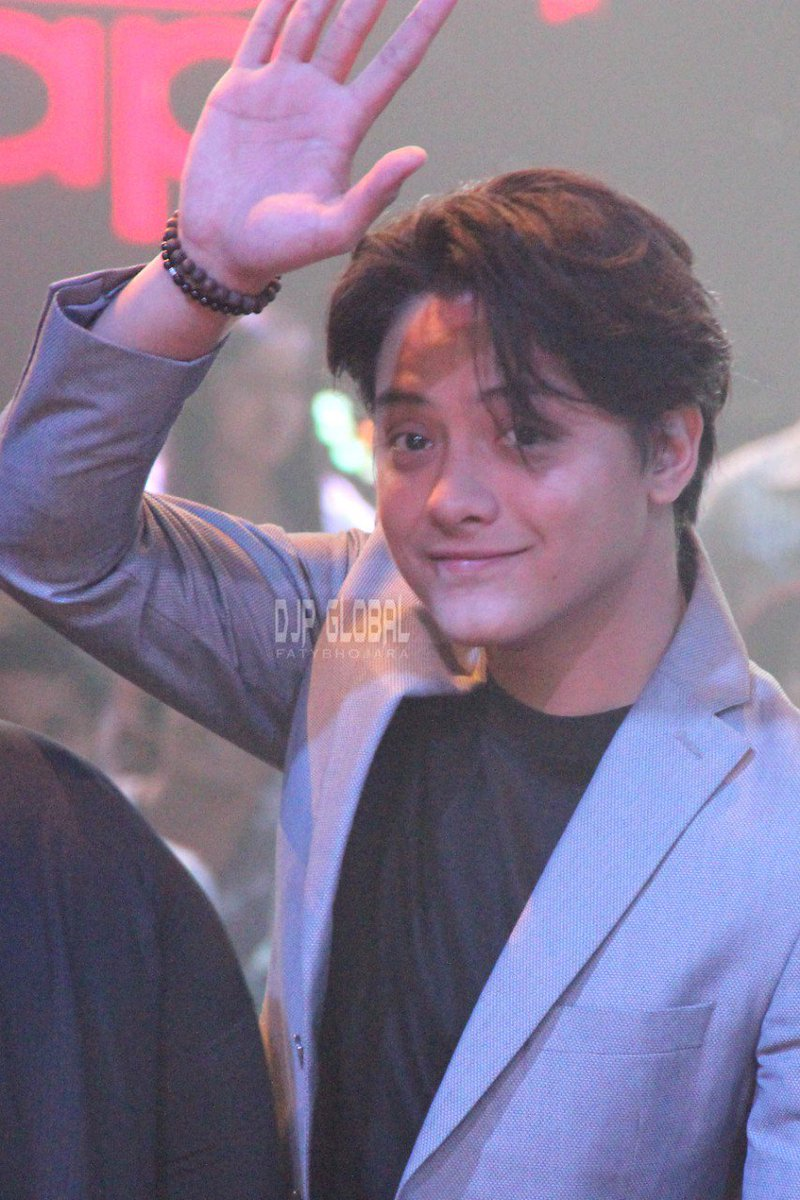
Daniel Padilla in 2016

Daniel Padilla started his acting career in television as Daniel Ledesma in Gimik 2010, before landing the lead role Patrick Rivero in Growing Up (2011). Padilla finally starred in a critically acclaimed prime-time television series Princess and I (2012–2013), and garnering further recognition for appearing alongside Kathryn Bernardo in Got to Believe (2013–2014). Padilla began transition to more adult roles as Angelo Buenavista in ABS-CBN top seller international distribution program, remake of Pangako Sa 'Yo (2015). The role earned him first nomination at the 2015 PMPC Star Awards for Best Actor. All of his soap operas listed as the most watch Filipino television programs.

Padilla debut as a movie actor as Billy Fernandez in 24/7 in Love (2012) co-start with Kathryn Bernardo (known as "KathNiel"). The role earned him nomination at the 2013 PMPC Star Awards for New Movie Actor of the Year. In the same year he was also cast as Angelo Santos in blockbuster film Sisterakas (2012). Padilla first starred in Must Be... Love (2013). In the same year he starred in Metro Manila Film Festival entry, supernatural horror film Pagpag: Siyam na Buhay (2013) directed by Frasco S. Mortiz. Grossed P23.7M on its first day of showing, with total Box-Office Gross P182,750,969 made the movie at No.6 of Star Cinema top-grossing MMFF entries from 2009 to 2013 Earned him nomination at the 2013 Metro Manila Film Festival and 2014 FAMAS Awards for Best Actor and Young Critics Circle for Best Performance. Padilla has starred in blockbuster film including She's Dating the Gangster (2014), Crazy Beautiful You (2015), all his film rank among the highest-grossing Philippines films and earned him award at the GMMSF Box-Office Entertainment Awards for Prince of Philippine Movies and PEP Choice Awards Male Movie Star of the Year three years in a row. His role as Ely Antonio in Barcelona: A Love Untold (2016) earned him Box Office Entertainment Award for Box Office King, PMPC Star Award for Movie Actor of the Year and FAMAS Award for Best Actor when he was 22 years old, made him one of the youngest awardee.

In 2017 Padilla starred in the television drama La Luna Sangre, Can't Help Falling in Love and Gandarrapiddo: The Revenger Squad as Tristan, Dos and Rapiddo respectively.

== Filmography ==
=== Film ===
Key
†	Denotes films that have not yet been released

List of film performances
Year	Title	Role	Notes	Source
2012	24/7 In Love	Billy Fernandez	Nomination – 2013 PMPC Star Awards for New Movie Actor of the Year	
2012	Sisterakas	Angelo Santos		
2013	Must Be... Love	Ivan Lacson	Lead role	
2013	Pagpag: Siyam na Buhay	Cedric Castillo	Lead role; Winner – 2013 GMMSF Box-Office Entertainment Awards for Prince of Philippine Movies; Winner – 2013 Metro Manila Film Festival for Mavshack Male Star of the Night; Nomination – 2013 Metro Manila Film Festival for Best Actor; Nomination – 2014 FAMAS Awards for Best Actor; Nomination – 2013 Young Critics Circle for Best Performance	
2014	Sa Ngalan ng Ama, Ina at mga Anak	Nato Parojinog		
2014	She's Dating the Gangster	Kenji / Kenneth delos Reyes	Lead role; Winner – 2015 GMMSF Box-Office Entertainment Awards for Teen King of Philippine Movies & TV; Nomination – 2015 FAMAS Awards for Best Actor	
2014	Bonifacio: Ang Unang Pangulo	Joaquin	Lead role	
2015	Crazy Beautiful You	Kiko Alcantara	Lead role; Winner – 2016 GMMSF Box-Office Entertainment Awards for Teen King of Philippine Movies & TV; Winner – 2015 PMPC Star Awards for Movie Love Team of the Year (with Kathryn Bernardo); Nomination – 2016 FAMAS Awards for Best Actor; Nomination – 2016 PMPC Star Awards for Movie Actor of the Year	
2016	Barcelona: A Love Untold	John Elias "Ely" Antonio	Lead role; Winner – 2017 Box Office Entertainment Award for Box Office King; Winner – 2017 PMPC Star Awards for Movies for Movie Actor of The Year; Winner – 2017 PMPC Star Awards for Movies for Movie Love Team of The Year; Winner – 2017 FAMAS Awards for Best Actor	
2017	Can't Help Falling in Love	Jose Ibarra "Dos" Gonzales Jr.	Lead role	
2017	Gandarrapiddo: The Revenger Squad	Chino Mariposque / Rappido	Lead role	
2018	The Hows of Us	Primo Alvarez	Lead role	
2021	Whether the Weather is Fine (Kun Maupay Man It Panahon)	Miguel	Lead role	
TBA	The Guest		Lead role	
TBA	Nang Mapagod si Kamatayan		Lead role	

=== Television ===
Key
†	Denotes TV dramas that have not yet been released

List of television drama performances
Year	Title	Role	Notes	Source
2010	Gimik 2010	Daniel Ledesma		
2011–2012	Growing Up	Patrick Rivero	Lead role	
2012–2013	Princess and I	Gerald Antonio "Gino" de la Rosa / Dasho Yuan Rinpoche	Lead role	
2013	Kailangan Ko'y Ikaw	young Gregorio "Bogs" Dagohoy	Guest appearance	
2013–2014	Got to Believe	Joaquin Manansala / Ryan	Lead role Winner – PMPC Star Awards for TV for German Moreno's Power Tandem Award (with Kathryn Bernardo)	
2014	Be Careful With My Heart	young Anastacio Alejo	Guest appearance	
2015–2016	Pangako Sa 'Yo	Angelo Buenavista	Lead role Nomination – 2015 PMPC Star Awards for Best Actor	
2017–2018	La Luna Sangre	Tristan Torralba	Lead role Nomination – 2017 PMPC Star Awards for Best Actor	
2022	2 Good 2 Be True	Elorde "Eloy" Borja	Lead role	
2025	Incognito	Andres Malvar / Wolf	Lead role	

=== Online series ===
List of online series performances
Year	Title	Role	Notes	Source
2020	The House Arrest of Us	Enrico "Korics" de Guzman	Lead role	
