= DOS (concert) =

2014 concert by Daniel Padilla

DOS: The Daniel Padilla Concert at the Big Dome
- Philippines concert by Daniel Padilla
- Promotion poster for DOS
- Associated album: DJP
- Start date: 30 April 2014
- End date: 30 April 2014
- Legs: 1
- No. of shows: 1

Daniel Padilla concert chronology
- Daniel: Live! (2013); DOS (2014); Most Wanted (2015)

DOS is the second solo concert by Filipino actor and singer Daniel Padilla, in served as his birthday party, and as support of his first full-length studio album, DJP. Held at the Smart Araneta Coliseum on April 30, 2014. The set list includes his songs from his album as well as another songs from featured artists

== Concerts ==
Padilla held press conference for his concert on March 27, 2014. He revealed that the concept of this concert will be sexier than the first one.

Wearing a white shirt, a black biker jacket and a pair of denim pants, Padilla opened the show with his hit song “Nasa Iyo Na Ang Lahat,” from the double platinum-selling album, “DJP.” Padilla continued with “Yugyugan Na,” Michael Buble’s “Everything,” Rivermaya’s “Liwanag sa Dilim” (with Khalil Ramos) and The Beatles’ “Something.” As in his previous concert, Daniel performed a set of mostly old songs—Otis Redding’s “Hard to Handle,” The Police’s “Every Breath You Take” (with Toni Gonzaga) and “I Got You (I Feel Good)” Daniel also sang “In My Life” with his mother, Karla Estrada. Even not made into the guest list, Vice Ganda came up to the stage asked by Padilla's mom Karla. He was cheered on with screams of approval as he played bass for his group Parking 5, which dished out the Juan de la Cruz Band’s “Titser’s Enemy No. 1.” And in what turned out to be a highlight of the show, he shared the spotlight with one of his idols, rock star Rico Blanco, in “Umaaraw, Umuulan”, “Awit ng Kabataan”. Allan Policarpio of Philippine Daily Inquirer praised Padilla renditions of “The Way You Look Tonight” and “It Might Be You” as he wrote "To be fair, Daniel did surprisingly pleasant renditions..". Padilla serenading Bernardo with “Put Your Head on My Shoulder,” and did slow dance. Padilla and Bernardo sang “Got to Believe in Magic,” soundtrack of their popular TV series, “Got to Believe.”

His most applauded performances include his version of "It Might Be You," "Everything," and "Ligaya." The concert also featured Richard Yap, and Rio Brothers.

== In media ==
This concert streamed live via Sky Cable’s pay per view services in Philippines.

== Set list ==
Setlist

Daniel Intro

- "Nasa Iyo na ang Lahat"
- "Yugyugan Na"
- Michael Buble's - "Everything"
- The Beatles's - "Something"
- The Black Crowes' "Hard To Handle"
- Eraserheads' - "With A Smile"
- "The Way You Look Tonight"

Parking 5

- "Teacher's Enemy Number 1" (Parking 5)
- Rivermaya's - "Liwanag sa Dilim" (with Khalil Ramos)

MENT Introduce The First Guest

- "Umaaraw, Umuulan" (with Rico Blanco)

Rico Blanco Solo

- "Sulong"
- "Awit Ng Kabataan"
- "Liwanag Sa Dilim"
- "Hinahanap-Hanap Kita"

The Daniel Padilla fever (with Toni Gonzaga)

- The Police's - "Every Breath You Take" (with Toni Gonzaga)
- "In My Life" (with Karla Estrada)

Richard Yap Solo

- James Taylor's - "Whenever I See Your Smiling Face."
- James Brown's "I Feel Good (I Got You)"
- "Awit ng Kabataan"

Kathryn Bernardo

- "It Might Be You"
- Paul Anka's - "Put Your Head On My Shoulders"
- "Got to Believe in Magic" (with Kathryn Bernardo)

== Concert dates ==
Date	City	Country	Venue	Attendance
April 30, 2014	Manila	Philippines	Smart Araneta Coliseum	Sold Out

== Guests ==
Date	Guest
April 30, 2015	Rico Blanco, Toni Gonzaga, Richard Yap, Rio Brothers, Parking 5, Khalil Ramos and Kathryn Bernardo

== Personnel ==
- Artists: Daniel Padilla
- Concert organizer: ABS-CBN
- Concert promoter: Star Events
