= Daniel Padilla Rocks with Yeng Constantino =

2014 concert tour

- Concert by Daniel Padilla and Yeng Constantino
- Promotion poster for Daniel Padilla Rocks with Yeng Constantino Live in Dubai 2014
- Associated album: Daniel Padilla
- Start date: April 10, 2014
- End date: April 20, 2014
- Legs: 4
- No. of shows: 1 in United Arab Emirates; 1 in United Kingdom; 1 in Rome; 1 in Italy; 4 Total

Daniel Padilla Rocks with Yeng Constantino is the concert tours by Filipino actor and singer Daniel Padilla and singer Yeng Constantino. Kicked off in Dubai on April 10, 2014, continued to London, Rome, end in Milan on April 20, 2014, with 4 legs and shows in total.

== Concerts ==
In Dubai show, VIP ticket holders had a chance to meet and greet Padilla and Constantino and had their photo op and CDs signed. Doors opened at 6 p.m. while the show started at 8 pm. The concert hold at Shaikh Rashid Auditorium at the Indian High School in Dubai brought together hundreds of mostly Filipino teenagers. Constantino set the mood for more than half an hour with some flawless English covers (David Guetta-Sia hit "Titanium"; Rihanna’s "Diamonds"; Pink’s "Just Give Me a Reason"; "Without You" from Mariah Carey) and Tagalog songs. Constantino jumping down the stage, thrilling her fans but the organisers urged her to climb back up, and she reluctantly agreed. Halfway through the show, she sat on the edge of the stage where she pulled up some audience members, saying: "Bata pa lang eto [they are just kids]" and sang her signature song, "Hawak Kamay" (lit. Holding Hands) along with her fans. After thanking the public, Constantino made way for Padilla.

Padilla started his performance with "Ako’y Sayo at Ika’y Akin Lamang (lit. I’m yours and you are mine), followed with "Grow old with you." He also performed "Nasa Iyo Na Ang Lahat" and "Prinsesa". After half an hour, Constantino joined Padilla for "Naaalala", when she excitedly threw his jacket to the crowd. Both singers thanked the public for their love, but Constantino asked fans if they want an encore for Padilla, they said "Yes". Padilla agreed singing the Constantion's "Salamat" (lit. The Dawn). After the Dubai concert they headed a flight to London.

While in London, fans with Limited VVIP tickets got a same chance, plus cocktails. Doors opened at 5 p.m. while the show started at 7 pm. Rome show had limited meet and greet and dinner. Door opened at 1 p.m. and the show started at 3 pm. And for the last leg in Milan, there was a limited meet and greet at Enterprise Hotel for ticketbuyers. Doors opened at 3 pm, while show started at 4 pm.

== Set list ==
Dubai Setlist

Yeng Constantino Segment

- David Guetta-Sia's – Titanium
- Rihanna’s Diamonds
- Pink’s Just Give Me a Reason
- Mariah Carey's Without You
- "Hawak Kamay" her songs

Daniel Padilla Segment

- "Ako’y Sayo at Ika’y Akin Lamang"
- "Grow Old with You"
- "Nasa Iyo Na Ang Lahat"
- "Prinsesa"

Share Stage

- "Naaalala"
- Encore (Daniel Padilla "Salamat")

== Concert dates ==
Date	City	Country	Venue	Attendance
April 10, 2014	Dubai	United Arab Emirates	Sheikh Rashid Auditorium	
April 11, 2014	London	United Kingdom	Novotel London West	
April 13, 2014	Rome	Rome	Teatro Dal Verme	
April 20, 2014	Milan	Italy	Teatro Tendastrisce	

== Personnel ==
- Artists: Daniel Padilla and Yeng Constantino
- Dubai show
  - Tour organizer: RISI Entertainment Productions, iCON Productions
- London show
  - Tour organizer: Moon Travel Evelyn Amorin, Pinoy Bulalohan Ltd. and RISI Entertainment Productions
- Rome show
  - Tour organizer: Moon Travel Evelyn Amorin, Khriencel Faezion
- Milan show
  - Tour organizer: RISI Entertainment Productions, Moon Travel Evelyn Amorin
