= Daniel Padilla videography =

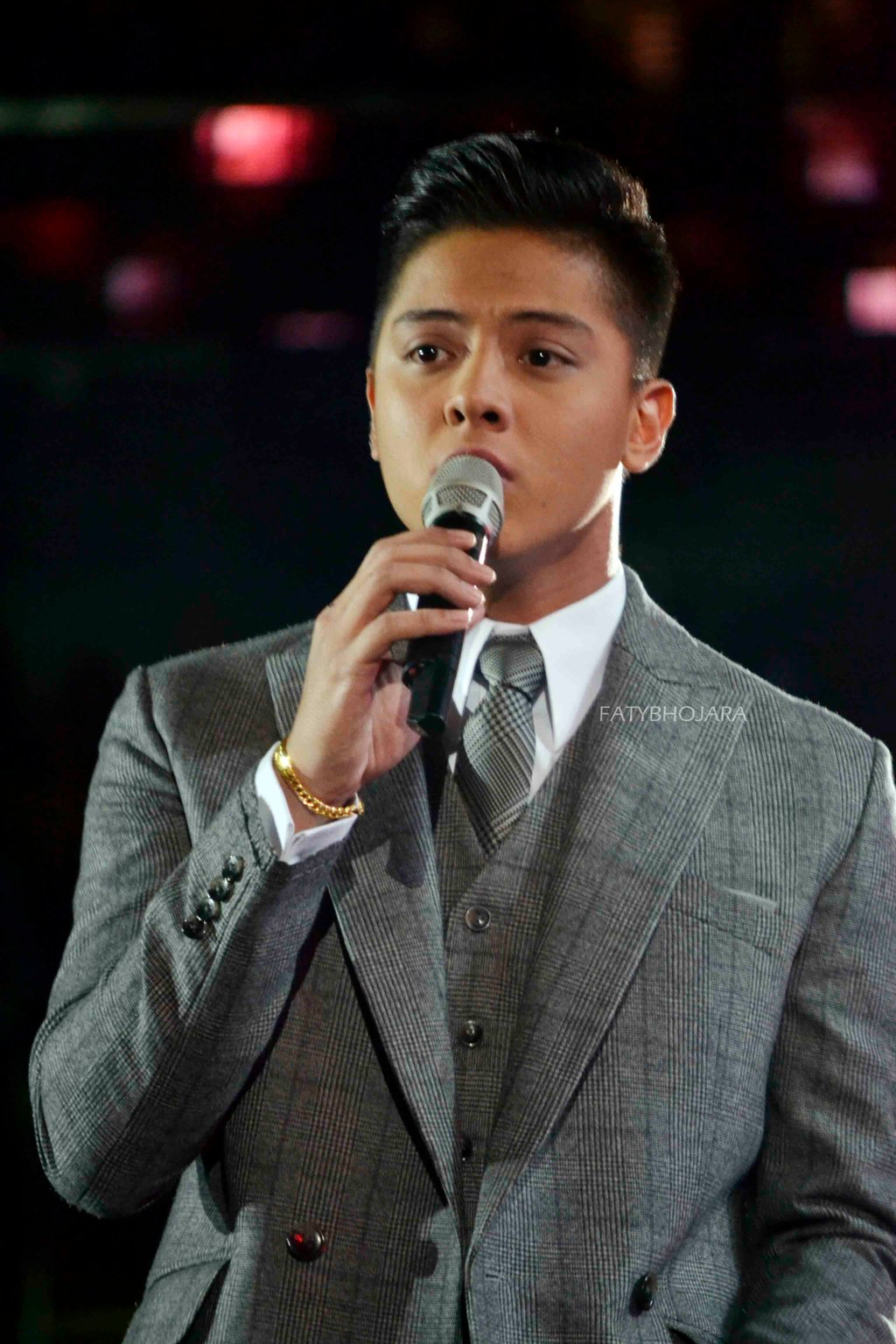
Daniel Padilla during Most Wanted Concert in 2015

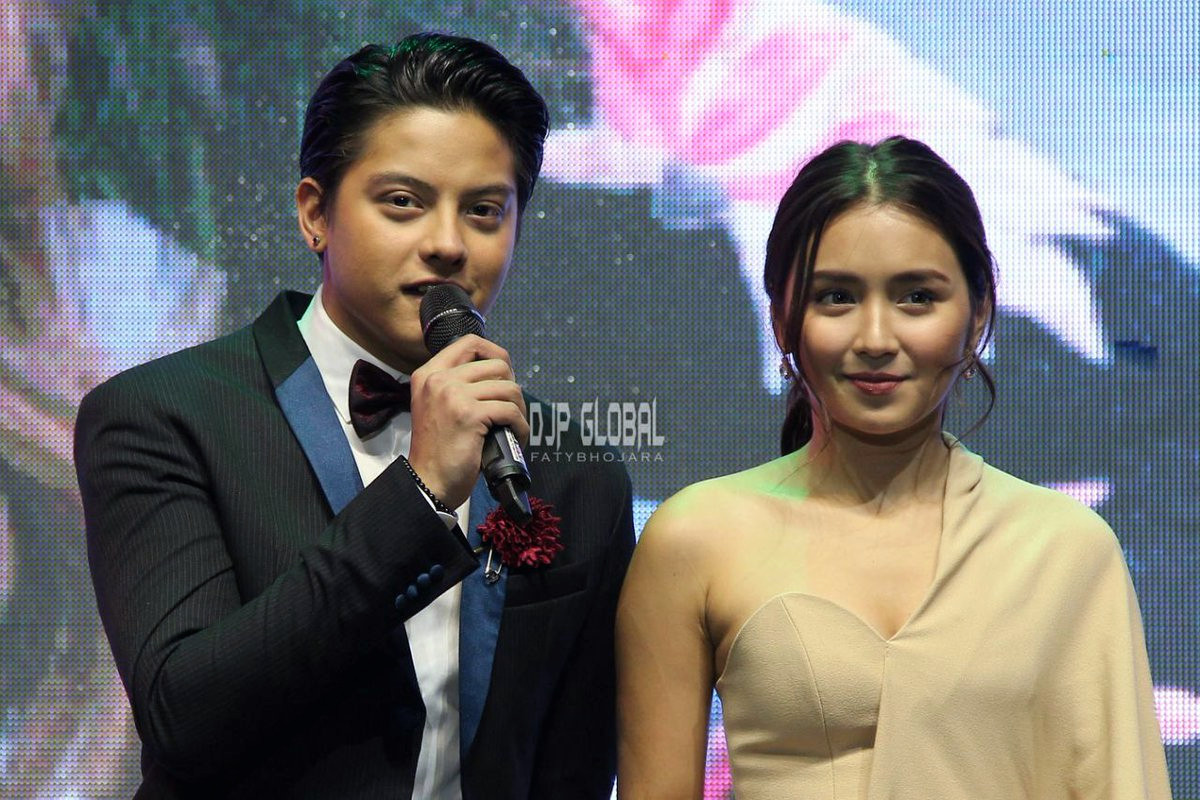
Kathryn Bernardo appeared on Nasa Iyo Na Ang Lahat, Simpleng Tulad Mo, and Sa Susunod Na Habang Buhay.

Daniel Padilla, a Filipino actor and recording artist has been featured in many music videos, and appeared in some commercials. This is a list of music videos and commercials featured Padilla.

== Music videos ==
Title	Year	Other credited performer(s)	Director(s)	Description	Ref.
As Lead Artist
"Prinsesa"	2013	None	Galileo Te		
"Nasa Iyo Na Ang Lahat"	2013	Kathryn Bernardo	Ateneo de Manila University		
"Simpleng Tulad Mo"	2014	Kathryn Bernardo	Renz Jazer O. Marinda		
"Unlimited and Free"	2014		Unknown		
"Pangako Sa'Yo"	2014	None	Polytechnic University of the Philippines		
"I Got You (I Feel Good)"	2016		Unknown		
"Can't Help Falling in Love"	2017	Kathryn Bernardo	Unknown	The music video shows Padilla serenading his lead actress Bernardo.	
As Guest & Featured Artist
"Da Best Ang Feeling"	2012	ABS-CBN Artists	Peewee Azarcon-Gonzales	Padilla along with Princess and I main cast including Kathryn Bernardo, Enrique Gill and Khalil Ramos enjoy playing in the rain.	
"Pinoy Summer, Da Best Forever"	2012	ABS-CBN Artists	Paolo Ramos	Padilla along with Princess and I main cast including Kathryn Bernardo, Enrique Gill and Khalil Ramos dance enjoy the summer season happily.	
"Lumiliwanag ang Mundo sa Kwento ng Pasko"	2012	ABS-CBN Artists	Paolo Ramos, Peewee Azarcon-Gonzales		
"Kwento ng Summer Natin"	2013	ABS-CBN Artists	Paolo Ramos & Peewee Azarcon-Gonzalez		
"Magkasama Tayo sa Kwento ng Pasko"	2013	ABS-CBN Artists	Paolo Ramos, Peewee Azarcon-Gonzales, Johnny Delos Santos, Carmelo Saliendra		
"PinaSmile" (Recording Version)	2014	Kathryn Bernardo	Paolo Ramos & Peewee Azarcon-Gonzalez		
"PinaSmile" (Full Version)	2014	ABS-CBN Artists	Paolo Ramos & Peewee Azarcon-Gonzalez		
"Thank You, Ang Babait Ninyo"	2014	ABS-CBN Artists	Paolo Ramos & Peewee Azarcon-Gonzalez		
"Shine, Pilipinas"	2015	ABS-CBN Artists	Paolo Ramos & Peewee Azarcon-Gonzalez		
"Thank You For The Love" (Recording Version)	2015	Kathryn Bernardo, James Reid, Nadine Lustre, Enrique Gil, Liza Soberano, Elha Nympha and Bamboo Mañalac	Paolo Ramos Peewee, Azarcon-Gonzales		
"Thank You For The Love" (Full Version)	2015	ABS-CBN Artists	Paolo Ramos & Peewee Azarcon-Gonzales	“Thank You for the Love” theme highlights how Filipinos never forget genuine and unconditional acts of love and generosity and how Filipinos never cease to give back even in simple ways.	
"Isang Pamilya Tayo Ngayong Pasko"	2016	ABS-CBN Artists	Paolo Ramo, Peewee Azarcon Gonzales	Daniel Padilla along with Kathryn Bernardo had a Christmas party with children from Noordhoff Craniofacial Foundation and Philippine Children's Medical Center through the help of Bantay Bata 163	
"Salamat 2016"	2016	Star Music All-Stars	Unknown		
"Ikaw Ang Sunshine Ko, Isang Pamilya Tayo"	2017	ABS-CBN Artists	Unknown	It showed how Filipinos can spread joy and hope even through simple ways just like how a guitar-playing nun, a colorful water vendor, and an elder serenading pedestrians with a bamboo flute—whose stories will be featured in the video—have brought smiles to other people.	
"Share The Love"	2017	Daniel Padilla, Kathryn Bernardo, Janella Salvador, Elmo Magalona	Unknown		
"Sa Susunod Na Habang Buhay"	2020	Kathryn Bernardo; Ben&Ben	Jorel Lising		

== Commercial ==
Brand	Year	Song Feature	Description	Ref.
KFC	2013	"Nasa Iyo Na Ang Lahat"		
Nescafe	2015			
Nescafe	2015			
Nescafe	2015			
Nescafe	2016			
Pepsi	2015			
Pepsi	2016			
Pepsi	2016			
Honda	2015			
Honda	2016			
Honda	2016			
Honda	2016			
Honda	2016			
Honda	2016			
Nescafe	2017			
Pepsi	2017			
