= Christmas Love Duets =

Compilation album by Daniel Padilla & Kathryn Bernardo
- Released: December 18, 2015
- Genre: Christmas music
- Length: 40:25
- Language: English
- Label: Star Music
- Producers: Malou N. Santos & Roxy Liquigan

Daniel Padilla & Kathryn Bernardo chronology
I Feel Good (2015)	Christmas Love Duets (2015)	DJ Greatest Hits (2016)

Christmas Love Duets is a collaborative compilation album of Christmas music put together for the Christmas season by Filipino actor and singer Daniel Padilla with actress Kathryn Bernardo under Star Records. The album features six songs with minus one including Jackson 5's "Give Love on Christmas Day," "Perfect Christmas," Judy Garland's "Have Yourself A Merry Little Christmas," "The Little Christmas Tree," Stevie Wonder's "Someday At Christmas," and John Lennon's "Happy Xmas (War Is Over)".

The album peaked at No. 1 on the Odyssey Music & Video's nationwide sales reports (overall). The title track, "Perfect Christmas", earned a nomination at the 29th Awit Awards for Best Christmas Recording.

== Promotion and reception ==
Astroplus on Twitter revealed the pre order of this album On November 31, 2015"Christmas Love Duets" album launched on December 20, 2015 5pm at SM City Fairview Atrium, including meet and greet with Padilla and Bernardo. During the launched they sang "Give Love On Christmas Day" and A Perfect Christmas

The album hit No. 1 on the Odyssey Music & Video’s nationwide sales reports overall for the week of December 14–20, 2015 While the title track, Perfect Christmas nominated at 29th Awit Awards for Best Christmas Recording.

== Track listing ==
No.	Title	Lyrics	Length
1.	"Give Love on Christmas Day" (Jackson 5)		3:17
2.	"Perfect Christmas"	Jose Mari Chan	4:28
3.	"Have Yourself A Merry Little Christmas" (Judy Garland)	Hugh Martin, Ralph Blane	4:11
4.	"The Little Christmas Tree"		3:15
5.	"Someday At Christmas" (Stevie Wonder)	Ron Miller, Bryan Wells	3:11
6.	"Happy Xmas (War Is Over)" (John Lennon's Plastic Ono Band)		3:33
7.	"Give Love On Christmas Day (Minus One)"		3:17
8.	"Perfect Christmas (Minus One)"		4:28
9.	"Have Yourself A Merry Little Christmas (Minus One)"		4:11
10.	"The Little Christmas Tree (Minus One)"		3:15
11.	"Someday At Christmas (Minus One)"		3:09
Total length:			40:25

== Personnel ==
- Malou N. Santos & Roxy Liquigan – Executive Producers
- Jonathan Manalo – A&R/Supervising Producer/Audio Content Head/
- Roque 'Rox' B. Santos – Over-all Album Producer
- Marivic Benedicto – Star Song, inc and New Media Head
- Regie Sandel – Sales and Distribution
- Jayson Sarmiento – Promo Specialist
- Jholina Luspo – Promo Associate
- London Angeles – Promo Coordinator
- Beth Faustio – Music Publishing Officer
- Eaizen Almazan – New Media Technical Assistant
- Abbey Aledo – Music Servicing Officer
- Andrew Castillo – Creative Head
- Christine Joy L. Cheng – Album layout Designer
- Marc Nicdao – Photographer
- John Valle, Denise Go Ochoa & Ryan Ko – Hair Make-up Artist
- Ton Lao – Stylist
- Dante Tañedo - Album Master

== Charts ==
=== Weekly charts ===
Chart (2015)	Peak
Odyssey Music & Video	1

== Release history ==
Country	Format	Release date	Label
Philippines	CD, digital download	December 18, 2015	Star Music
