= DJ Classics: Back at the Araneta =

2017 concert by Daniel Padilla

- Philippines concert by Daniel Padilla
- Associated album: DJ Greatest Hits
- Start date: 5 February 2017

Daniel Padilla concert chronology
- Most Wanted (2015); DJ Classics: Back at the Araneta (2017)

DJ Classics was the fourth solo concert by Filipino actor and singer Daniel Padilla. Scheduled in Smart Araneta Coliseum on February 5, 2017, but postponed due to his busy schedule.

== Background ==
Star Music head Roxy Liquigan on November 27, 2016 confirmed that Padilla will hold a major concert, "DJ Classics: Back at the Araneta," on February 5, 2017 at the Araneta Coliseum via his instagram account. Padilla's concert, titled "DJ Classics: Back at the Araneta", became a trending topic on Twitter immediately after the announcement. It was reported earlier in 2016 that Padilla will hold a concert that year. But it didn't push through because he was busy working on the ABS-CBN soap opera Pangako Sa 'Yo and the Star Cinema drama Barcelona: A Love Untold. The singer, then was originally scheduled to perform his major concert at the Big Dome in February 2017. But in one episode of “Tonight with Boy Abunda” Padilla revealed that he has no time to prepare himself for it due to his busy schedule. First, tickets should have been on sale beginning November 30, 2016, later moved to December 15, 2016, but once again it has now been delayed indefinitely due to the concert's postponement.

== Tour dates ==
| Date | City | Country | Venue | Attendance |
|---|---|---|---|---|
| February 5, 2017 | Manila | Philippines | Smart Araneta Coliseum | |

== Personnel ==
- Artists: Daniel Padilla
- Concert organizer: ABS-CBN
- Concert promoter: Star Events
