= Most Wanted (concert) =

2015 concert by Daniel Padilla

- Philippines concert by Daniel Padilla
- Promotion poster for Most Wanted
- Associated album: I Feel Good
- Start date: 13 June 2015

Daniel Padilla concert chronology
- DOS (2014); Most Wanted (2015); DJ Classics: Back at the Araneta (2017)

Most Wanted is the third solo concert by Filipino actor and singer Daniel Padilla, as support of his third full-length studio album, I Feel Good. On June 13, 2015 at the Mall of Asia Arena, Padilla sang 14 songs in total. These featured songs from his latest album, "Fly Me to the Moon", "How Sweet It Is (To Be Loved by You)", and "Isn't She Lovely". He also sang duets, "Moon River" with KZ Tandingan, "Nothing's Gonna Stop Us Now" with Morissette, "Moondance" with Kyla, and "So Real So Good" with Kathryn Bernardo. Other guests included Your Face Sounds Familiar finalists Nyoy Volante and Edgar Allan Guzman and the Harana Boys.

== Concerts ==
Padilla held a press conference for his "Most Wanted" concert at Dong Juan in Quezon City, on June 6, 2015. The concert, held on June 13, 2015, was Padilla's first concert at the SM MoA Arena and also the first time to be directed by Johnny Manahan with musical direction by Marvin Querido.

Padilla opened his concert with his song. His first guest was X Factor Philippines champion KZ Tandingan. He sang the duets "Moon River" and "Quando Quando" with her. While he went backstage, KZ Tandingan sang a solo, "Till I Met You". The next guests, Your Face Sounds Familiar finalists Nyoy Volante and Edgar Allan Guzman, sang Maroon 5's "She Will Be Loved". A recording that showed Padilla's career in 2015 played, with the caption "Crazy and Beautiful". Then he sang his soundtrack contribution for his movie Crazy Beautiful You, "Nothing's Gonna Stop Us Now", with Morissette.

After singing "What a Wonderful World", Padilla asked everyone to retweet the selfie that he took during his concert. He revealed that for every retweet, Pepsi Philippines will donate $1 to lighting projects that will benefit an Aeta community in Tarlac.

Padilla and Harana Boys then sang Eraserhead's songs. Padilla then sang his remake of VST & Co.'s "Ikaw Ang Aking Mahal". During this song, Bernardo's picture was revealed on the screen. The next guest was Kyla, with whom Padilla sang the duet "Moon Dance". Then Padilla greeted Vice Ganda, who was sitting in the front row, and sang "How Sweet It Is To Be Loved By You". The next guest was Gary Valenciano, who performed solo on stage. The last guest was Kathryn Bernardo, with whom Padilla shared the stage for "So Real So Good".

Unfortunately, Padilla was not able to perform his final song, "For Once in My Life", because the fans had become unruly, swarming the stage and forcing security to step in and whisk their idol backstage.

During this event, the actor announced that his fourth studio album, titled I Feel Good, was already available.

== In media ==
Unlike his previous concert that only streamed live via Sky Cable's pay per view services in Metro Manila, Laguna, Rizal, Bacolod, Dumaguete, at General Santos City, this concert also streamed live in the cinemas of malls in Davao, Cebu, Iloilo, Cabanatuan, Pampanga, and Legazpi. The Most Wanted concert also could be played during a limited period from ABS-CBNmobile-powered mobile devices.

== Setlist ==
Setlist

Daniel intro

- James Brown's "I Feel Good (I Got You)"

First guest

- "Moon River" (with KZ Tandingan)
- "Quando Quando" (with KZ Tandingan)
- "Till I Met You" (KZ Tandingan)

Second guest

- Maroon 5 - "She Will Be Loved" (Nyoy Volante and Edgar Allan Guzman)

VCR Crazy Beautiful 2015 Third guest

- "Nothing's Gonna Stop Us Now" (Morissette)
- "What a Wonderful World"

Fourth guest

- Eraserheads - "Kailan"
- Eraserheads - "A Smile in your Heart"
- VST & Co. "Ikaw Ang Aking Mahal"

Fifth guest

- "Moon Dance" (with Kyla)
- "How Sweet It Is To Be Loved By You"

Sixth guest: Gary Valenciano solo

- "Just The Way You Are"
- "Uptown Funk"

KathNiel

- "Pangako Sa'Yo"
- "So Real, So Good"

Encore

- "For Once in My Life" (Note: Padilla was not able to do this final song, because the fans came up to the stage and forced the security to step in and take him backstage.)

== Concert dates ==
Date	City	Country	Venue	Attendance
June 13, 2015	Manila	Philippines	SM Mall of Asia Arena	

== Guests ==
Date	Guest
June 13, 2015	The Edgar Allan Guzman, Nyoy Volante, KZ Tandingan, Morissette, Harana, Kyla, Gary Valenciano and Kathryn Bernardo

== Personnel ==
- Artists: Daniel Padilla
- Concert organizer: ABS-CBN
- Concert promoter: Star Events
- Director: Johnny Manahan
- Musical Director: Marvin Querido
