= Daniel Padilla =

Filipino actor and singer (born 1995)

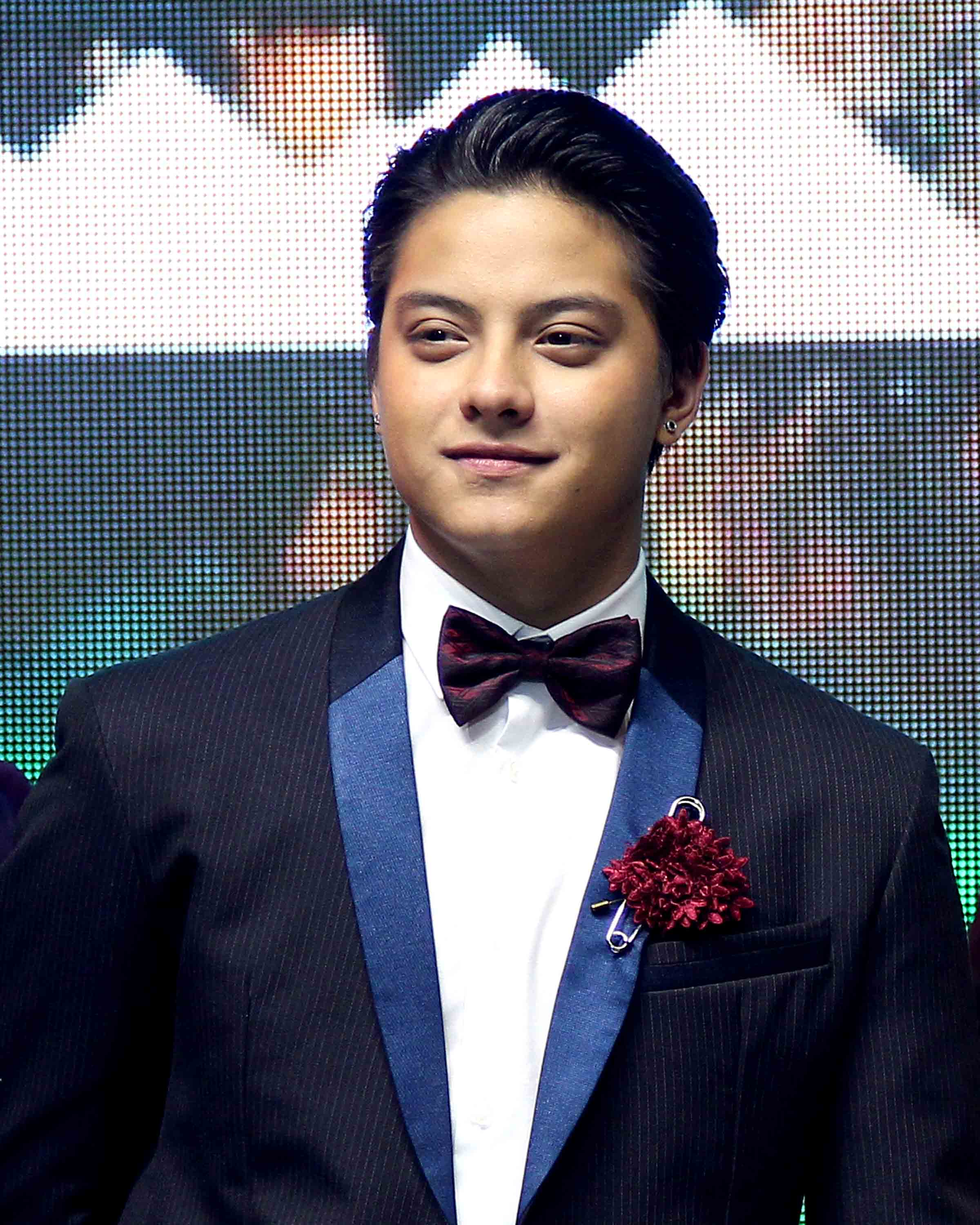
- Padilla in 2016
- Born: Daniel John Elago Ford; April 26, 1995 (age 31); Manila, Philippines
- Occupations: Actor; recording artist; endorser; model; singer; musician
- Years active: 2010–present
- Agent: Star Magic (2010–present)
- Works: Discography; filmography; videography
- Height: 5 ft 11 in (1.80 m)
- Parents: Rommel Padilla (father); Karla Estrada (mother)
- Relatives: Padilla family
- Awards: Full list
- Musical career
- Genres: Pop; OPM
- Instruments: Vocals; bass; guitar
- Years active: 2011–present
- Label: Star Music (2012–present)

Daniel John Elago Ford (Note: Born Daniel John Elago Ford, with his surname 'Ford' being adapted from his mother, Carla Elago Ford. His parents were unmarried, making him an illegitimate child of actor Rommel Padilla. Since Daniel John Elago Ford was born prior to the Republic Act No. 9255 (Acknowledgement of Paternity), which was enacted in 2004, his legal middle name and surname would be his mother's middle name and surname.) (born April 26, 1995), known professionally as Daniel Padilla, is a Filipino actor and singer. He is a recipient of multiple accolades across television, film, and music, including the FAMAS Award for Best Actor and PMPC Star Award for Movie Actor of the Year, as well as three World Music Awards nominations.

Padilla made his television debut with a supporting role in the soap opera Gimik 2010 (2010), before landing the lead role in Growing Up (2011). He has since starred in the Filipino hit television series Princess and I (2012–2013), Got to Believe (2013–2014), Pangako Sa 'Yo (2015–2016), La Luna Sangre (2017–2018), and 2 Good 2 Be True (2022). In films, he made his debut as a supporting actor in 24/7 in Love and Sisterakas (both 2012), and later starred in the box office hit films Must Be... Love, Pagpag: Siyam na Buhay (both 2013), She's Dating the Gangster (2014), Crazy Beautiful You (2015), Barcelona: A Love Untold (2016), Can't Help Falling in Love (2017), and The Hows of Us (2018). Padilla's films have earned a total of ₱3.14 billion in the box office, with the lattermost becoming the highest-grossing Filipino film at the time.

As a recording artist, Padilla has released three double platinum albums in the Philippines including Daniel Padilla (2012), DJP (2013), I Heart You (2014), I Feel Good (2015), and the compilation album DJ' Greatest Hits (2016). He has also held solo concerts including Daniel Live! (2013), DOS (2014), Most Wanted (2015), and DJ Classics: Back at the Araneta (2017).

== Early life ==
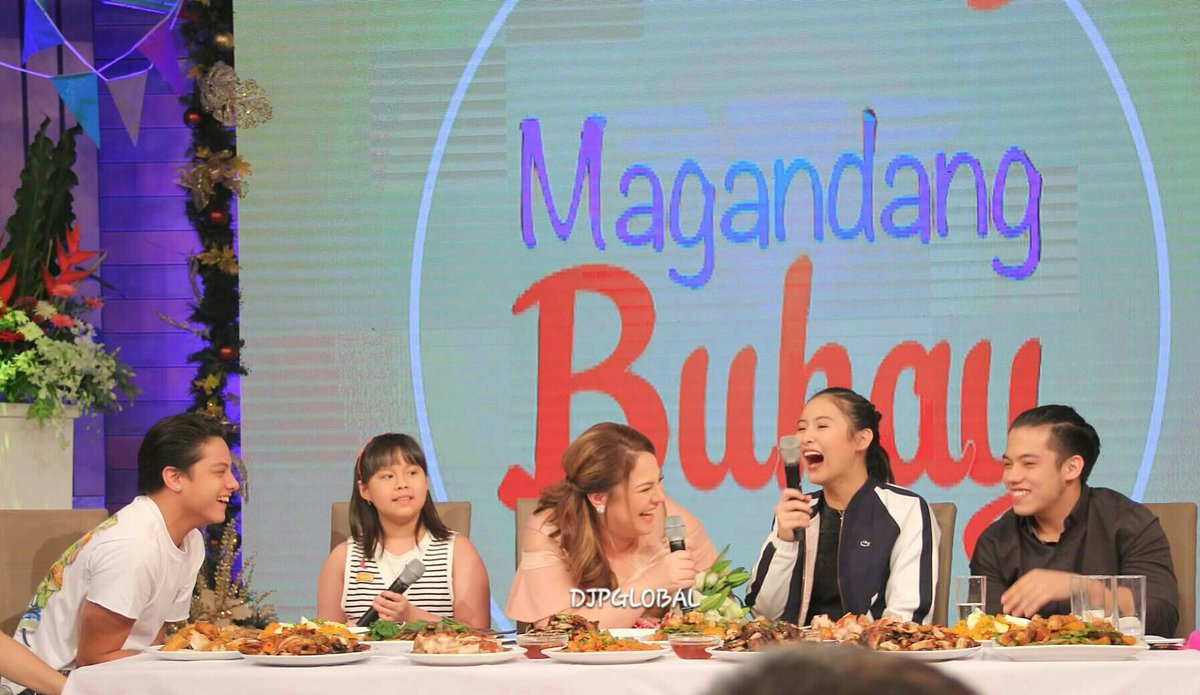
Daniel Padilla and family on Magandang Buhay in 2016

Padilla was born as Daniel John Elago Ford on April 26, 1995, in Manila, Philippines. He is the son of actors Rommel Padilla of Nueva Ecija and Carla Ford (screen name: Karla Estrada); he is of quarter White American descent from his mother's side. His mother raised Padilla as a single parent. Padilla is the nephew of action star Robin Padilla and BB Gandanghari, and has seven half-siblings from his father's side, including Matt Raprap Padilla, RJ Padilla, Roanna Padilla, and Red Padilla, and three younger half-siblings from his mother's side, JC Padilla, Margaret Planas, and Carmella Tenorio. Carmela "Leila" celebrated her 18th birthday in a lavish party at Blue Leaf Pavilion, McKinley Hill. Padilla met his siblings from his father's side in 2011 when he turned sixteen.

Padilla lived for a year in Tacloban and studied there (grade 4). In 2014, he registered as an AMA Education System's student. Due to the tight schedule, he reportedly took the home study program of UST Angelicum College years back. Padilla finally shared his plans to go back to school after his mother, Karla Estrada, announced on Magandang Buhay that she wants all her children to finish their studies.

Padilla was discovered by the late talent manager Douglas Quijano who pushed him to audition for Star Magic. He was introduced to the media as a member of the Star Magic Circle 2013. At a press conference in 2013, Padilla said he never imagined ending up in entertainment, but he thinks that he is in show business for a more important reason since his family went through financial difficulties.

== Career ==
=== 2010–2012: Career beginnings and breakthrough ===
Padilla's first acting job was in 2010, in a minor role in Gimik 2010, a remake of the hit 1990s Filipino youth-oriented show, in which he was paired with Julia Montes. When he joined Star Magic, he used the screen name Daniel Padilla, using the surname of his biological father. He was next cast as Patrick Rivero in the youth-oriented show, Growing Up, where he first worked with co-star Kathryn Bernardo. He and Bernardo paired again in the soap opera Princess and I (2012–2013), which became one of the most popular shows on ABS-CBN.

His film debut came in 2012 when he was selected to join Star Magic's 20th anniversary ensemble cast movie as Billy Fernandez in 24/7 In Love (2012) with co-star Bernardo. They also had support roles in the film Sisterakas (2012).

Star Music released Padilla's self-titled debut album, Daniel Padilla on May 28, 2012. The first commercial and digital single released from the album was ‘’Hinahanap-Hanap Kita’’ on April 20, 2012. The album sold more than 10,000 copies in less than a week. The album peaked at the No. 1 on the Odyssey Music & Video's nationwide sales reports (overall). It went on to sell more than 30,000 copies and was certified double platinum on March 14, 2013.

=== 2013–2014: Early success ===
In January 2013, Padilla interpreted a hit song for Himig Handog P-pop Love Songs (2013), "Nasa Iyo Na Ang Lahat". The music video hit No. 1 on the 2013 Pinoy Myx Year-End Countdown, and was listed among the top three Filipino Trending Music Videos of 2013. "Nasa Iyo Na Ang Lahat" won special awards at the Himig Handog finale night, including MOR Listener's Choice, Tambayan 101.9 Listener's Choice, Star Records CD Buyer's Choice, and MYX Choice for Best Video.

On March 18, 2013, Padilla released "Kamusta Ka" as the lead single for his first full-length-studio album, DJP. DJP peaked at number 1 on Odyssey Music & Video's nationwide sales reports (overall). DJP album went platinum in less than 24 hours, but listed on PARI, September 25, 2013, and went double platinum the next day. Padilla held his first headlining concert, "Daniel: Live!" on April 30, 2013, at the Smart Araneta Coliseum. It is the first concert to be streamed live via Sky Cable’s pay per view services in the Philippines.

In 2013 he took on the role of Joaquin and Ryan Manansala on his second prime time soap opera with Bernardo, Got To Believe. The series finale holds the record as the highest rating final episode in 2014." Padilla had finally made a breakthrough in feature films with Must Be... Love. In the same year Padilla also starred in his first horror film, Pagpag: Siyam na Buhay (2013). Both film made the Top 10 List of highest-grossing Filipino films in 2013.

In 2014, Padilla interpreted a song for the Himig Handog P-Pop Love Songs (2014), "Simpleng Tulad Mo". He was one of the youngest interpreters in the competition. The music video debuted at number 2 and the next week hit No.1 for five weeks. Padilla and Yeng Constantino held a multi-national tour, Daniel Padilla Rocks with Yeng Constantino. It began in Dubai on April 10, 2014, continued to London and Rome, and ended in Milan on April 20, 2014, with four legs and shows in total. While his second studio album, I Heart You was released on April 14, 2014. The digital album peaked at No. 1 on the iTunes Philippines chart, the physical album reached the No. 1 spot on Odyssey Music & Video's nationwide sales reports. Less than a month after its release, I Heart You achieved platinum record status and was certified double platinum on May 8, 2015.

Padilla marked his 19th birthday with a second sold-out concert at the Smart Araneta Coliseum on April 30, 2014. "DOS" was another event at the Araneta Coliseum. It was streamed live on SkyCable Pay-Per-View. The concert also featured his own band Parking 5 before they disbanded in July 2014. He recorded single, "Unlimited And Free" as the theme song of ABS-CBN Mobile in 2014. On December 1, 2014, Padilla was given his own stars on the country's version of the Hollywood Walk of Fame, the Eastwood Walk of Fame, located at Eastwood City, Quezon City.

In 2014, Padilla made three films: the action film Sa Ngalan ng Ama Ina at mga Anak with the Padilla clan, his first historical, action drama; Bonifacio: Ang Unang Pangulo; and the box office success, She's Dating the Gangster, with his co-star Bernardo.

=== 2015–present: Transition to adult roles and continued success ===
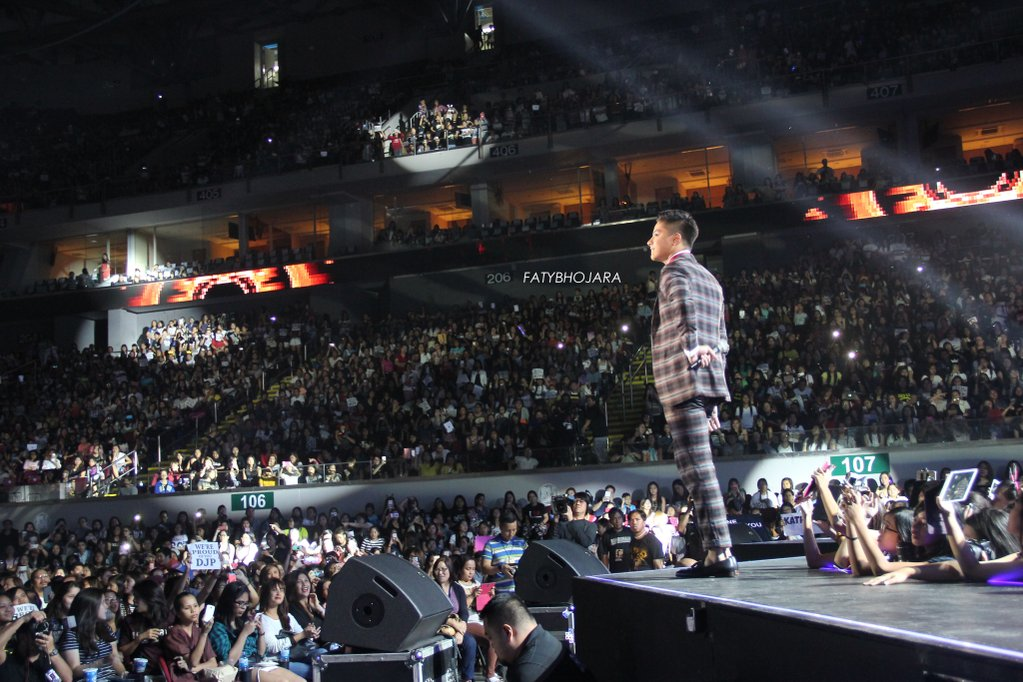
Daniel Padilla performing during his Most Wanted Concert, 2015

Padilla, along with Bernardo, dubbed as "KathNiel", visited Dubai to hold a concert titled "Daniel Padilla and Kathryn Bernardo Live in Dubai" on January 1, 2015. In February, Padilla was named Nickelodeon's Global Slime Star at the 2015 Kids' Choice Awards, making him the first Filipino to receive such an award. He was also in the Favorite Asian Act category but lost to Indonesian group JKT48.

Padilla's film with Bernardo in 2015 titled Crazy Beautiful You set three records, with P32 million, making it the first Filipino movie to register such a box office gross on its first day. The film passed the P300million mark, and was the second film to earn $2 million in international screenings. It was listed in the Top ten grossing films of 2015 .

Padilla returned to television on May 25, 2015, for the remake of the 90s soap opera Pangako Sa 'Yo as Angelo Buenavista. The finale episode raked in a 44.5% rating. The show also top ABS-CBN's top selling international distribution programs.

His third studio album I Feel Good premiered on Spotify on June 7, 2015, before officially being released on June 13. Padilla hand-picked most of its songs, and says it is his favorite album. The I Feel Good album reached gold status in less than a week. The album peaked at number one on Odyssey Music & Video's nationwide sales reports.

Padilla held his third major concert, "Most Wanted" on June 13, 2015, at the Mall of Asia Arena. He sang 14 songs in total, including songs from his latest album I Feel Good. The concert streamed live via Sky Cable's pay per view services and also streamed live in the cinemas of malls in Davao, Cebu, Iloilo, Cabanatuan, Pampanga, and Legazpi. The Most Wanted concert also could be played during a limited period from ABS-CBNmobile-powered mobile devices. In the same year Padilla along with co-actor Bernardo released a Christmas album, Christmas Love Duets. The album peaked at No. 1 on the Odyssey Music & Video's nationwide sales reports (overall) The title track, "Perfect Christmas", earned a nomination at the 29th Awit Awards for Best Christmas Recording.

Padilla, along with over 50 Filipino performers from the Philippines and the US, performed at "ASAP Live in New York" at Barclays Center. During the show Padilla with Bernardo promoted their upcoming movie Barcelona: A Love Untold. The movie officially released on September 14. Padilla starred as Ely Antonio, which earned him compliments from director Olivia Lamasan and critics. George Vail Kabrisante of The Manila Times said that Padilla is one of the worthies to earn 2017 best actor awards. The movie grossed total ₱240,000,000 (locally), making it the second of the Top 10 Grossing Philippine Films of 2016.

On November 27, 2016 Star Music head Roxy Liquigan confirmed Padilla's fourth major concert dubbed "DJ’s Classic Back at Araneta". It was supposed to be staged at the Smart Araneta Coliseum on February 5, 2017. Due to his busy schedule, the concert was reset to October 2017. Padilla released his first compilation album, titled DJ Greatest Hits, on December 19, 2016. The album consists of eighteen songs; including sixteen of his all-time hits since the start of his music career, as well as two additional new songs, "Reyna Ng Puso Ko" and "Bastaw Ikaw".

Padilla played the role of Jose Ibarra "Dos" Gonzales Jr. in the romantic-comedy film Can't Help Falling in Love. His performance was praised by critics.

ABS-CBN released the first trailer of Padilla and Bernardo's upcoming Philippine horror-action fantasy drama television series sequel to the 2010 fantasy drama Imortal, La Luna Sangre (Spanish for The Blood Moon) in 2016.

Padilla as Kapamilya signed on February 12, 2024, another contract with ABS-CBN's Carlo L. Katigbak-Mark Lopez for 15 years.

Since 2025, Padilla stars alongside an ensemble cast as Andres Malvar in an action drama series Incognito.

== Personal life ==
In 2018, the love team of Daniel Padilla and Kathryn Bernardo publicly disclosed the inception of their romantic relationship, revealing that they had been romantically involved since May 25, 2011. However, on November 30, 2023, the duo made a joint announcement formally declaring the end of their romantic relationship.

=== Business ===
On May 1, 2024, Padilla graced the soft launching of his co-owned "J Castles", in Purok 7, Barangay Gonzales, Tanauan, Batangas. The “first biggest immersive amusement park," has two main zones with each having nine amenities, including Studio and Pop castles.

Kris Lawrence was commissioned by Padilla and co-owners to have created ambient theme music for J Castles (dubbed as "Disneyland of Tanauan") including instrumental and surrealistic soundscape with 3D soundtrack visual effects in each room. Jay Durias requested Lawrence to sing J Castles’ theme song, “Let There Be Lights” and finally “Sky Full of Colors,” at the fireworks finale of the park's launching.

In 2022, Daniel and his mother Karla Estrada opened a KFC fastfood in Tacloban. Padilla is also a co-owner of a branch Spice Grills, a Filipino food restaurant in Dubai, U.A.E. In August 2025, he revealed and hoped to become a successful businessman. He was into graphic design and invested his first business, the Barber Shop.

=== Interest ===
Padilla is a motorcycle and car enthusiast. He owns luxury cars. In 2025, he bought a Toyota Land Cruiser 76.

== Public image ==
Padilla opened a Twitter account in July 2011. He was named among the top ten most followed Twitter accounts in the Philippines in 2016, with 5.4 million followers. Padilla, along with his co-actor Bernardo, received awards at the Push Awards, where the most influential stars online were recognized by ABS-CBN entertainment website PUSH.com.ph.

== Philanthropy and endorsement ==
Daniel Padilla and two other Filipina singers were appointed by Organisasyon ng Pilipinong Mang-aawit (OPM) as OPM junior ambassadors on June 7, 2013, at the Pagcor Grand Theater during the finals night of the "OPM@PAGCOR 3: The Search for the Next Total OPM Performer". The aim is to encourage the youth to support and promote Original Pilipino Music. He is also brand ambassador of the Bureau of Internal Revenue (BIR). In July 2017 Padilla along with Bernardo was appointed as Cybersmile ambassador to fight against cyberbullying.

Padilla was one of the artists who sent donations and gave a free concert at the Quezon City Memorial Circle on November 7, 2014, for the families of those who had been killed in the Typhoon Haiyan, known as the Yolanda typhoon. Padilla along with his mother were given a special award, the Bayani ng Haiyan ("Hero of Haiyan"), from the Haiyan Disaster Governance Initiative headed by film producer-actor Carlo Maceda, which stands as the communications director of the organization. In the same month, Padilla was involved in another charity event. He led the star-studded basketball exhibition "Hoops for Hope" charity game at the court of the Mall of Asia Arena on November 16, 2014. The charity game aimed to help the children of World Vision Philippines and the Child Haus Foundation.

In 2013, Padilla was listed as one of the biggest Filipino celebrity endorsers. He became the celebrity face of KFC in the Philippines. Padilla was also selected as the brand ambassador of local fashion brand Bench, as well as Pepsi, Nescafe, Honda, and Oishi. In 2015 Padilla was selected as the High Sierra endorser.

== Ancestry ==
Ancestors of Daniel Padilla

12. Pedro Padilla Ortiz
8. José Padilla Sr.
13. Monica Galvez
4. Casimero Padilla Sr.
9. Ramona Bustamante
2. Rommel Padilla
14. ---- Cariño
10. Rufino Cariño
15. Teodora Vergara
5. Eva Cariño
11. Asuncion Rivera
1. Daniel Padilla
6. Raymond Ford
3. Carla Ford
7. Thelma Ilago

== Discography ==
Studio albums

- DJP (2013)
- I Heart You (2014)
- I Feel Good (2015)

EPs

- Daniel Padilla (2012)

Compilation albums

- DJ Greatest Hits (2016)

Christmas albums

- Christmas Love Duets (with Kathryn Bernardo) (2015)

== Tours and concert ==
Headlining

- Daniel Live: A Birthday Concert (2013)
- DOS: Daniel on Stage (2014)
- Most Wanted (2015)
- DJ Classics: Back at the Araneta (2017)

Concert tours

- Daniel Padilla Rocks with Yeng Constantino (2014)

Tours participation

- One Magical Night 2014 (2014)
- One Magical Night 2015 (2015)
- ASAP Live in New York (2016)

== Filmography ==
=== Selected filmography ===
Film

- 24/7 in Love (2012)
- Sisterakas (2012)
- Must Be... Love (2013)
- Pagpag: Siyam na Buhay (2013)
- Sa Ngalan ng Ama, Ina at mga Anak (2014)
- She's Dating the Gangster (2014)
- Bonifacio: Ang Unang Pangulo (2014)
- Crazy Beautiful You (2015)
- Barcelona: A Love Untold (2016)
- Can't Help Falling in Love (2017)
- Gandarrapido: The Revenger Squad (2017)
- The Hows of Us (2018)
- Whether the Weather is Fine (2021)

Television

- Gimik 2010 (2010)
- Growing Up (2011–2012)
- Princess and I (2012–2013)
- Got to Believe (2013–2014)
- Pangako Sa 'Yo (2015–2016)
- La Luna Sangre (2017–2018)
- 2 Good 2 Be True (2022)
- Incognito (2025)

== Awards and nominations ==
Padilla has received awards and nominations in television, film and music. He won the 26th Awit Awards for Best Selling Album of the Year. Padilla won the 2013 Myx Music Awards Favorite New Artist, and the second single from his album, "Prinsesa" (original: "The Teeth"), earned a nomination for Favorite Remake.

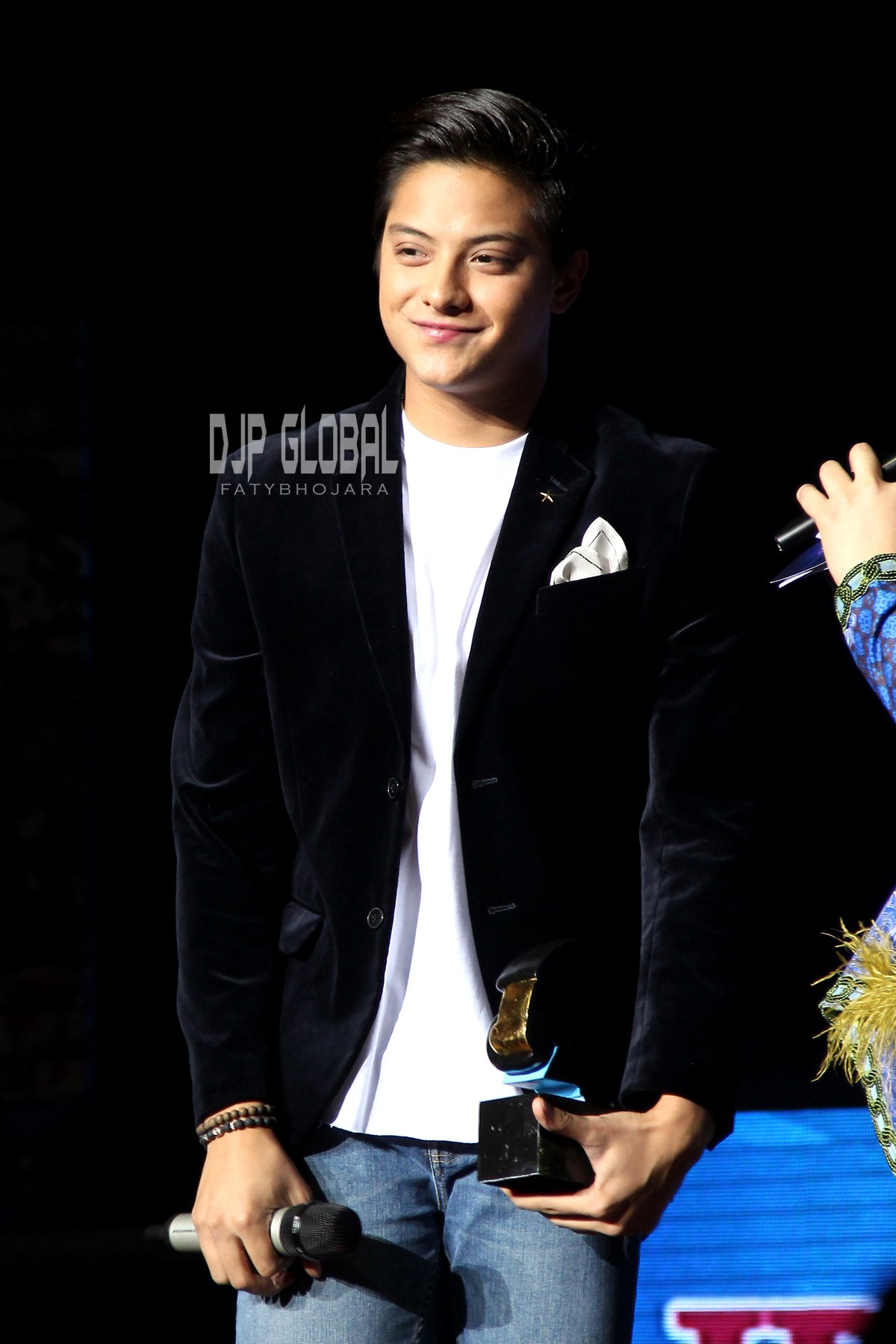
Daniel Padilla at MOR Pinoy Music Awards 2016.

DJP won three awards at three different awards ceremonies including the 27th Awit Awards, PMPC Star Awards for Music and MOR Pinoy Music Awards for Best Selling Album of the year, Pop Album of the Year and Album of the Year respectively. The show earned him 2013 ASAP Pop Viewers Choice Awards for Top Kapamilya TV Character.

Padilla is the first Pinoy artist to win Kids' Choice Awards for Global Slime Star. In November 2013, Padilla was nominated in the 2013 World Music Awards for World's Best Male Artist, World's Best Live Act, and World's Best Entertainer of the Year. Must Be Love... earned Padilla a 2012 FAMAS Awards for German Moreno Youth Achievement Award and a nomination at the PMPC Star Awards for New Movie Actor of the Year. Pagpag: Siyam na Buhay earned him a 2013 Metro Manila Film Festival Awarded for Mavshack Male Star of the Night and a nomination in the Best Actor category. He was also nominated at the 2014 FAMAS Awards for Best Actor and the 2013 Young Critics Circle for Best Performance. The film also earned him his first Prince of Philippine Movies award at the 2014 GMMSF Box-Office Entertainment Awards.

His hit song "Simpleng Tulad Mo" won the 2015 MYX Music Award for Favorite Song.

I Heart You earned him awards and a nomination at the 2015 PMPC Star Awards, Myx Music Awards, MOR Pinoy Music Awards and ASAP Pop Viewers Choice Awards. His hit song "Simpleng Tulad Mo" has won Myx Music Awards for Favorite Song.

She is Dating The Gangster and Got To Believe earned Padilla his first GMMSF Box-Office Entertainment Awards for Teen King of Philippine Movies & TV, 2015 PEP List Awards for Movie Star of the Year and for the second time being nominated at the 2015 FAMAS Awards Crazy Beautiful You earned him his second 2016 GMMSF Box-Office Entertainment Awards for Prince of Philippine Movies. Along with Bernardo Padilla he won the 2016 PMPC Star Award for Movie Love Team of the Year. He won PEP List Awards for Movie Star of the Year and received nomination at the 2016 FAMAS Awards.

During Pangako Sa' Yo's run, Padilla received awards, such as Vietnam's Face of the Year Awards, LionHearTV's RAWR Awards, PUSH Awards, ASAP Pop Teen Choice Awards, and ALTA Awards. He also earned his first nomination at the PMPC Star Awards for Best Drama Actor.

Padilla's portrayal as Ely Antonio in Barcelona: A Love Untold earned him his first Box Office Entertainment Award for Box Office King, PMPC Star Award for Movie Actor of the Year, FAMAS Award for Best Actor He won Box Office Entertainment Award for Phenomenal Box Office Star two years in a row with Gandarrapiddo: The Revenger Squad and The Hows of Us. In 2019 he won Luna Award for Best Actor.
