= I Heart You (album) =

Studio album by Daniel Padilla
- Released: April 14, 2014
- Recorded: October 2013 – March 2014
- Genres: Pop, pop rock, OPM
- Length: 41:10
- Languages: Tagalog, English
- Label: Star Music
- Producer: Roque "Rox" B. Santos

Daniel Padilla chronology
DJP (2013)	I Heart You (2014)	I Feel Good (2015)

I Heart You Deluxe Platinum Edition cover

Singles from I Heart You
- 1. "I Heart You" Released: April 1, 2014

Music video
- "I Heart You Lyric Video" on YouTube "I Heart You (bloopers)" on YouTube

I Heart You is the second studio album by Filipino actor and singer Daniel Padilla under Star Records, released on April 14, 2014 in the Philippines. "I Heart" You is the first single of the same title of the album.

After the success of his first major concert in 2013, he sets a second concert called DOS: The Daniel Padilla Birthday Concert at Smart Araneta Coliseum.

== Reception ==
The digital album peaked at No.1 on the iTunes Philippines chart, as well as the physical album, reached No. 1 spot on Odyssey Music & Video’s nationwide sales reports. The album also reported beat One Direction and Mariah Carey in Astrovision/Astroplus Top-Selling Albums. Less than a month after its release, I Heart You achieved platinum record status along with the double platinum record for DJP on ASAP, May 29, 2014 and received double platinum certification on May 8, 2015. The album earned ASAP Pop Viewers Choice Awards and nomination at the 2014 PMPC Star Awards for Album Cover Concept & Design of the Year.

== Track listing ==
No.	Title	Lyrics	Music	Composer(s)	Length
1.	"I Heart You"	Nathan Concepcion	Nathan Concepcion		3:00
2.	"Sana S'ya Na"				4:00
3.	"With A Smile"	Ely Buendia	Ely Buendia		4:13
4.	"Ewan"				3:07
5.	"Everything"	Michael Bublé, Alan Chang, Amy Foster-Gilles	Michael Bublé, Alan Chang, Amy Foster-Gilles		3:26
6.	"Sa Aking Piling"	Roque "rox" B. Santos	Roque "rox" B. Santos	Gino Cruz	3:57
7.	"It Might Be You"	Alan, Marilyn Bergman	Dave Grusin		4:14
8.	"Langit Na Naman"				4:18
9.	"Walang Iba"				4:32
10.	"In My Life"	Lennon–McCartney	Lennon–McCartney		2:34
11.	"Next In Line"	Wency Cornejo	Wency Cornejo	Jack Rufo Live	3:49
Total length:					41:10

== Personnel ==
- Malou N. Santos & Roxy Liquigan – Executive Producers
- Rox B. Santos – Over-all Album Producer, Vocal Supervision, Vocals Produced, Backup Vocals
- Jonathan Manalo – Audio Content Head
- Jayson Sarmiento – Promo Specialist
- Marivic Benedicto – Star Song, inc and New Media Head
- Joel Ramos – Digital Marketing Strategist
- Regie Sandel – Sales and Distribution
- Beth Faustio – Music Publishing Officer
- Eaizen Almazan – New Media Technical Assistant
- Abbey Aledo – Music Servicing Officer
- Ryan Ko – Make-up Artist
- Ton Lao – Stylist
- Marc Nicdao – Photographer
- Andrew Castillo – Creative Head
- April Mae Aragones – Album layout Designer
- Thellie Castro-Palanisamy – Branded Entertainment Unit Head
- Karen Almeida-Pedrealba, Princess Bernardo, Jacqueline Chua, Janina Garcia, Niki Soriano – B.E.U. Account Executives
- Sugar David, Donna Seat – B.E.U. Coordinators
- Dante Tañedo – Album Master, Recorded, Mixing at the Bellhaus Studios
- Viva Music Publishing, Inc. – Publisher
- Jack Rufo – Live Guitars
- Raizo Chabeldin – Vocals Produced
- Nino Regalado – Live Drums
- Jack Rufo – Backup Vocals

== Weekly charts ==
Chart (2014)	Peak
Odyssey Music & Video	1

== Release history ==
Country	Edition	Release date	Label	Certification
Philippines	CD, Digital download	April 14, 2014	Star Music	PARI: Double platinum; Received: April 17, 2015
