= 24/7 in Love =

- Theatrical movie poster
- Directed by: John D. Lazatin; Mae Czarina Cruz-Alviar; Frasco Santos Mortiz; Dado C. Lumibao
- Written by: Anjeli Pessumal; Carmi Raymundo; Joel Mercado
- Produced by: Tess V. Fuentes
- Starring: Kathryn Bernardo; Daniel Padilla; Bea Alonzo; Diether Ocampo; Gerald Anderson; John Lloyd Cruz; Angelica Panganiban; Kim Chiu; Maja Salvador; Piolo Pascual; Pokwang; Sam Milby; Xyriel Manabat; Zaijan Jaranilla; Zanjoe Marudo
- Cinematography: David Abaya; Gary Gardoce; Dan Villegas
- Edited by: Beng Bandong; Vito Cajili
- Music by: Jessie Lasaten
- Production company: ABS-CBN Film Productions
- Distributed by: Star Cinema
- Release date: November 21, 2012
- Running time: 130 minutes
- Country: Philippines
- Language: Filipino
- Box office: ₱80 million

24/7 in Love is a 2012 Filipino romantic comedy film directed by John D. Lazatin, Mae Czarina Cruz-Alviar, Frasco Santos Mortiz and Dado C. Lumibao from Star Cinema. The film was released nationwide on November 21, 2012. The film is a romance anthology in which several characters are involved in various crazy antics for love's sake. The ensemble cast is composed of selected Star Magic talents to celebrate the agency's 20th anniversary.

== Synopsis ==
Jane (Kathryn Bernardo), a die-hard fan, wants to win tickets to Billy Fernandez's (Daniel Padilla) concert. To do this she must answer the question, "What would you do if it was the end of the world?" In search for this answer she meets different people with different love stories: a 40-year-old virgin named Virginia (Pokwang) who meets a gigolo named Charles (Sam Milby); a hopeless romantic secretary, Barbara (Maja Salvador) who is helping her boss, Ken (Diether Ocampo) with "personal issues"; Belle (Bea Alonzo) who is in love with her gay best-friend, Butch (Zanjoe Marudo), an advertising executive; Verna (Angelica Panganiban) who falls in love with Jane's older brother, Elvis (John Lloyd Cruz), a waiter in Vietnam; Jomar (Zaijan Jaranilla) an orphan boy live in "St. Sophia Orphanage" who is trying to court Ayie (Xyriel Manabat) with the help of a 35-year-old mentally-challenged diagnosed man named Pipoy (Piolo Pascual); Patty (Kim Chiu) she was secretary of model for her company who traces her first love, Alvin (Gerald Anderson) to become an underwear model for her company.

== Cast and characters ==
=== Main cast ===
- Kathryn Bernardo as Jane Dela Cuesta
- Daniel Padilla as Billy Fernandez
- Piolo Pascual as Pipoy Ronquillo
- Diether Ocampo as Ken Ramirez
- Angelica Panganiban as Verna Francisco
- John Lloyd Cruz as Elvis Dela Cuesta
- Bea Alonzo as Belle Villegas
- Kim Chiu as Patty Castillo
- Gerald Anderson as Alvin Cruz
- Maja Salvador as Barbara Alcaraz
- Zanjoe Marudo as Butch Vinzon
- Sam Milby as Charles Padilla
- Pokwang as Virginia Matimtiman
- Zaijian Jaranilla as Jomar
- Xyriel Manabat as Ayie Manrique

=== Supporting cast ===
- Jason Francisco as Jay
- Jason Gainza as Ronald "Finn" Villareal
- Joem Bascon as Benny
- John Lapus as Chang
- Joseph Marco as Gabriel
- Jane Oineza as Daniella "Bambi"
- Thou Reyes as Sam
- Maricar Reyes as Lorraine
- Kaye Abad as Carla
- Jewel Mische as Leah
- Matt Evans as Dave
- Ian Veneracion as Sam
- Wendell Ramos as Juliano
- Matet de Leon as Mariang Manrique
- Nina Dolino as Nikki

=== Guest cast ===
- Marc Logan as TV Host
- Marlann Flores as Jonas de Cuesta
- Arlene Tolibas as Billy's manager
- Julia Barretto as Gabriela
- Miles Ocampo as Jamie
- JC de Vera as Patrick
- Alex Medina as Jiggie
- Arjo Atayde as Ron
- Victor Silayan as Timmy
- Ryan Bang as Commercial model

=== Special participation ===
- Coco Martin as Dante
- Bernard Palanca as Oscar
- Ahron Villena as Steve
- Vice Ganda as Nadine
