= Can't Help Falling in Love (film) =

2017 Filipino film by Mae Cruz-Alviar

- Theatrical release poster
- Directed by: Mae Cruz-Alviar
- Written by: Carmi Raymundo; Kristine Gabriel
- Produced by: Charo Santos-Concio; Malou N. Santos; John Leo Garcia
- Starring: Kathryn Bernardo; Daniel Padilla
- Cinematography: Zach Sycip
- Edited by: Marya Ignacio
- Music by: Jessie Lasaten
- Production company: ABS-CBN Film Productions, Inc.
- Distributed by: Star Cinema
- Release date: April 15, 2017
- Running time: 119 minutes
- Country: Philippines
- Languages: Filipino; English
- Box office: ₱320 Million (US$6.3 million)

Can't Help Falling in Love is a 2017 Filipino romantic comedy-drama film directed by Mae Cruz-Alviar, starring Kathryn Bernardo and Daniel Padilla. It was their very first project right after their blockbuster film Barcelona: A Love Untold last 2016. The film was produced and released by Star Cinema on April 15, 2017.

Can't Help Falling in Love earned ₱33 million on its first day making it the highest Black Saturday opening for a Filipino film.

== Plot ==
Gab (Kathryn Bernardo) is a "close-to-perfect girl" who is set to wed her long-time boyfriend and soon-to-be lawyer in the U.S. Jason (Matteo Guidicelli). Her world, however, suddenly turns upside down when she discovers that she is already married - but to a total stranger, the happy-go-lucky Dos (Daniel Padilla). As she figures out with Dos how this unlikely incident happened, Gab starts breaking her own rules to survive their crazily confusing situation. But the changes in her well-planned life seems to cause a change of heart as well.

== Cast ==
- Kathryn Bernardo as Gabriela "Gab" Benedictos De La Cuesta-González
- Daniel Padilla as José Ibarra "Dos" García González Jr.
- Matteo Guidicelli as Jason Aguinaldo
- Cherry Pie Picache as Mama Em
- Lito Pimentel as Papa Jun
- Lotlot de Leon as Mama Two
- Dennis Padilla as Papa Two
- Joross Gamboa as Nilo / Alpen Rose
- Kristel Fulgar as Viel
- Janus del Prado as William Charles
- Pinky Amador as Mrs. Alma Aguinaldo
- Johnny Revilla as Mr. George Aguinaldo
- Hannah Ledesma as Marie
- Chienna Filomeno as Shine
- Devon Seron as Tet
- Earl Ignacio as Atty. John Francis Langit
- China Cojuanco-Gonzalez as Ms. Faye Corpuz
- Niña Dolino as Janine Aguinaldo
- Belle Mariano as Grace De La Cuesta
- Clarence Delgado as Prince De La Cuesta
- Archie Alemania as Tito Paul
- Zanjoe Marudo as Mayor Luis Villarin
- Ejay Falcon as Trino
- Piolo Pascual as Emil
- Ruben Maria Soriquez as Cristofano

== Production ==
Cruz-Alviar at the grand press conference shared that Can't Help Falling in Love was shot almost immediately after Barcelona: A Love Untold. It took Padilla and Bernardo a while before they were able to shed the personalities of their Barcelona characters. On January 21, there were reports of shots from some underwater scenes for Can't Help Falling in Love. The photos of them spread online as they were seen shooting scenes diving in the Moalboal located in the southwestern tip of Cebu. Based on the photos, they travel around South Cebu went from Cabana Beach Club Resort in Moalboal on Sunday to visit the hidden Mantayupan falls, located in Barili town, around 30 km from their first location. They were in Cebu for a week in January 2017 to shoot some important scenes for their movie. They explored the white sand beaches of Moalboal, Bukilat Cave and Boho Rock Resort of Camotes Island, Osmeña Peak in Dalaguete, as well as the towns of Boljoon, Argao and Oslob. Editing process finished on April 5, 2017, Just 9 days before the official release. The film received a rating of PG from the Movie and Television Review and Classification Board (MTRCB) and rated B by The Cinema Evaluation Board (CEB).

== Music and soundtrack ==
The soundtrack title for Can't Help Falling in Love is a pop ballad and reggae song originally recorded by Elvis Presley/UB40 with the same title performed by the lead actor, Daniel Padilla. The music video officially released on March 16, 2017, while the song officially released on radio through MOR 101.9 on March 23, 2017. The MV launched for the first time on ABS-CBN's music program, ASAP on April 2, 2017. The song officially released on April 13, 2017, through iTunes and Spotify. Also, this song was also used as the official theme song and part of the soundtrack for action-adventure drama series, Lolong (Season 2) (also known as Lolong: Bayani ng Bayan) which aired from January 20 to June 13, 2025.

== Release ==
=== Promotion ===
During filming, the first teaser of the trailer officially released on March 15, while the second teaser was released on March 21, 2017, has garnered more than 2 million views in less than 24 hours. The production of the film still on editing room, when Star Cinema released first trailer on March 29. followed by the press conference which was held on March 30 at Villa Immaculada Events Place, Intramuros, Manila. The malls tour promotion, dubbed "Can't Help Summer Road Tour" kicked off on April 2, 2017, at TriNoma & Market! Market! and ended on April 10 at SM Seaside City Cebu which has aired live on TV Patrol. To promoted the film, Padilla and Bernardo performed on several live shows such as ASAP, It's Show Time, and Your Face Sounds Familiar: Kids. They also guest starred in episodes of Magandang Buhay, Tonight with Boy Abunda. and an episode of Family Feud.

=== Box office ===
The film was released on April 14, 2017, initially in 270 cinemas and was expanded to 300 cinemas and eventually in 400 cinemas (worldwide) for its seventh days. Can't Help Falling in Love has grossed ₱33 million on its first day of showing, making it the biggest Black Saturday opening for a Filipino film. After 4 days, the film grossed ₱100 million. After 10 days, the film grossed ₱180 million. On its 13th day, the film grossed ₱200 million locally. On its 24th day, the film grossed ₱300 million worldwide. (Partial Gross)

=== International release ===
For the first time in the Filipino movie history, a local film held a premiere night at United Arab Emirates. Can’t Help Falling In Love has an advanced screening for fans on April 19 at 8pm at Novo Cinema Festival City. The film released across the UAE on April 20 and it has grossed $150,443 after 4 days. The film has grossed $900,000 in North America after 10 days. The film was screened in the United States and Canada starting April 21 in 63 cinemas. Due to popular demand it was extended up to four weeks

The film also screened in key countries worldwide, including Qatar, Bahrain, Oman, United Kingdom, Austria, Italy, Spain, Australia, New Zealand, Saipan, Taiwan, Malaysia, Singapore, Hongkong, and for the first time in The Filipino Channel history screened in Brunei Darussalam and Indonesia.

=== Critical reception ===
Can't Help Falling In Love received mixed to positive reviews from critics. Pablo A. Tariman of The Philippine Star reviewed the film as "a different kind of kilig" In other hand, Philbert Ortiz Dy a professional movie critics of The Neighborhood rated the film 2.5 out of 5, called it "lapsing into lazy formula," stated the screenplay is "patchy". But he gave credit to the leads especially Padilla's performance. Francis Joseph Cruz a movie critics of Rappler also stated the film is "relentlessly charming" and "too committed to formula," but admitted it as,"... Cruz-Alviar's most entertaining movie," and complimented Padilla stating that he, "...who really manages to keep the movie from being tedious in its reliance on formula." Irish Eden R. Belleza of Gulf News share same thought, she name it as "typical romantic comedy," but "...lovely and refreshing at the same time." Stephanie Mayo a film reviewer of Concept News Central admitted, "Can’t Help Falling in Love may have some cringingly corny scenes" but "..it fun and entertaining" and rated the film 3 out of 5. Nazamel Tabarres a film enthusiast of Pelikulamania also rated the film 3 out of 5 stated the film "predictable, formulaic but lovely." Ro Manalo of Cosmopolitan complimented the film wrote, "Overall, I found the movie to be funny, fast-paced, and full of kilig."

=== Feedback ===
According to Twitter Philippines, "Filipinos couldn't stop talking" about the film, releasing 700,000 tweets related to the movie from April 10–17. Netizens can't help but give their positive reviews, ratings and comments about the movie.
