= Must Be... Love =

- Theatrical movie poster
- Directed by: Dado Lumibao
- Screenplay by: Melissa Chua; Roumella Niña L. Monge
- Story by: Melissa Chua; Roumella Niña L. Monge; Vanessa Valdez
- Produced by: Elma S. Medua
- Starring: Kathryn Bernardo; Daniel Padilla
- Cinematography: Charlie Peralta; Gary Gardoce
- Edited by: Marya Ignacio
- Music by: Jessie Lasaten
- Production company: Star Cinema
- Release date: March 13, 2013
- Running time: 122 minutes
- Country: Philippines
- Language: Filipino
- Box office: ₱113 million

Must Be... Love is a 2013 Filipino coming-of-age romantic comedy film directed by Dado Lumibao, starring Kathryn Bernardo and Daniel Padilla. The film was shot in many locations in Cebu and Laguna in the Philippines. The film was produced by Star Cinema and was released nationwide on March 13, 2013.

This marks the first solo film with love tandem Kathryn Bernardo and Daniel Padilla in a leading role following their roles in the ensemble films 24/7 in Love and Sisterakas in 2012 as well as from Princess and I that ended on February 1 a month later.

== Synopsis ==
"Must Be... Love" follows the love story of Patricia (Kathryn Bernardo), who is better known as "Patchot or Patch", and her childhood best friend, Ivan (Daniel Padilla). But what will Patchot do if she starts falling in love with her best friend? And what if Ivan only sees her as a 'best friend'? This problem will develop when another girl enters Ivan's life. Unfortunately for Patchot, it's her cousin Angel (Liza Soberano). Will Ivan fall in love with "Patchot" or will they remain as best friends forever?

== Casts ==
=== Main cast ===
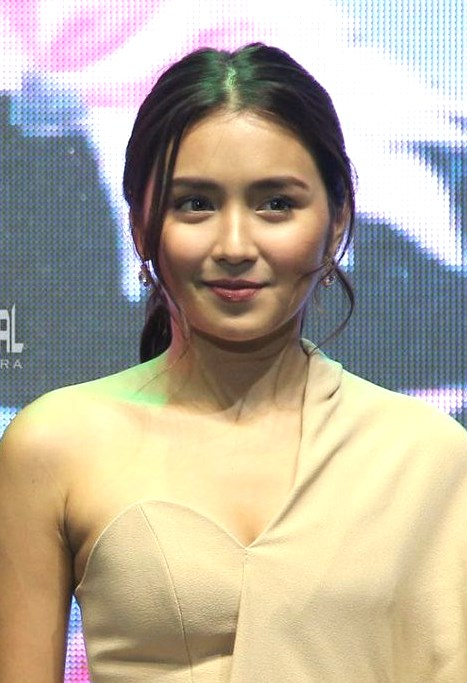
Kathryn Bernardo portrays Princess Patricia "Patchot" Espinosa.

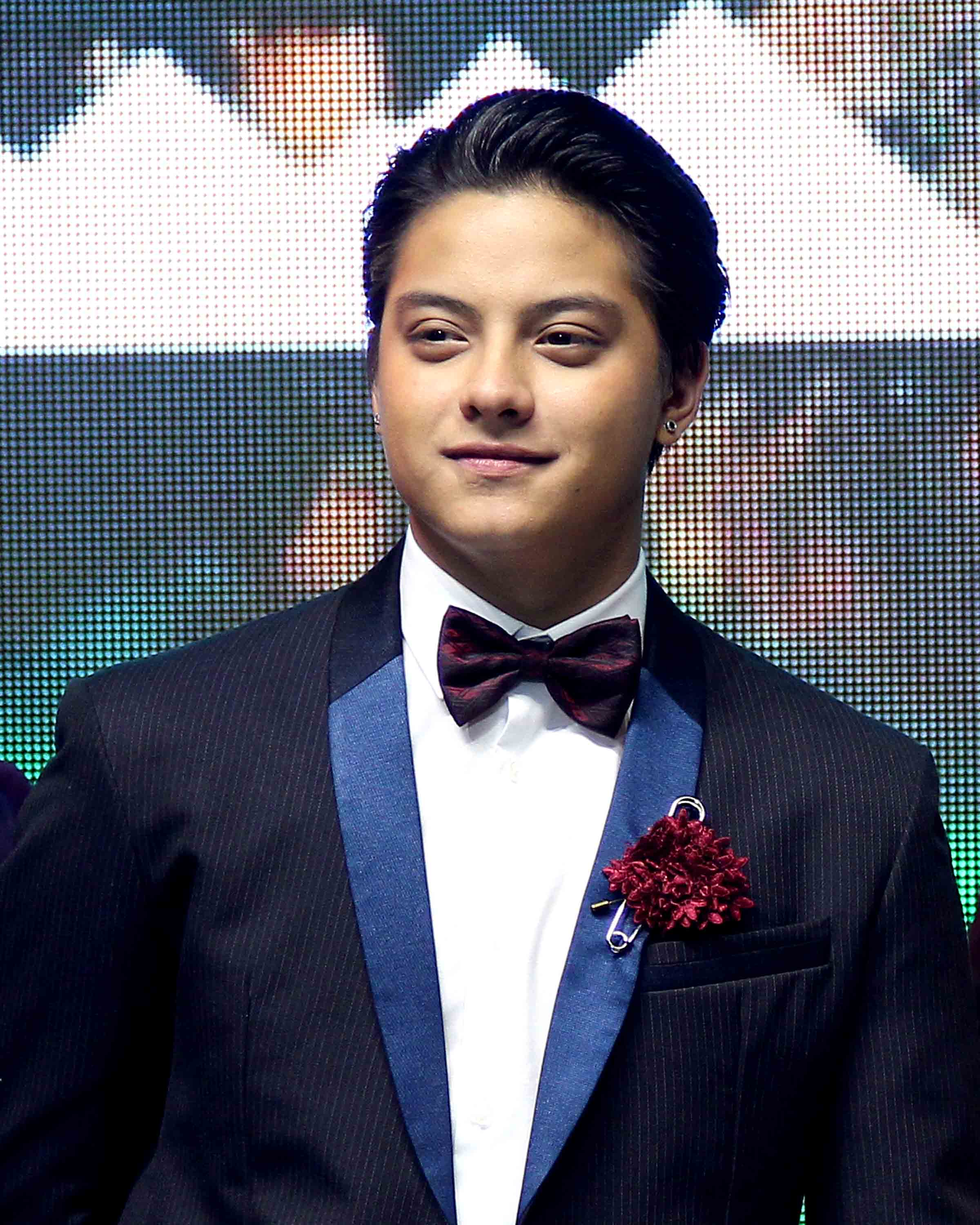
Daniel Padilla portrays Ivan Lacson.

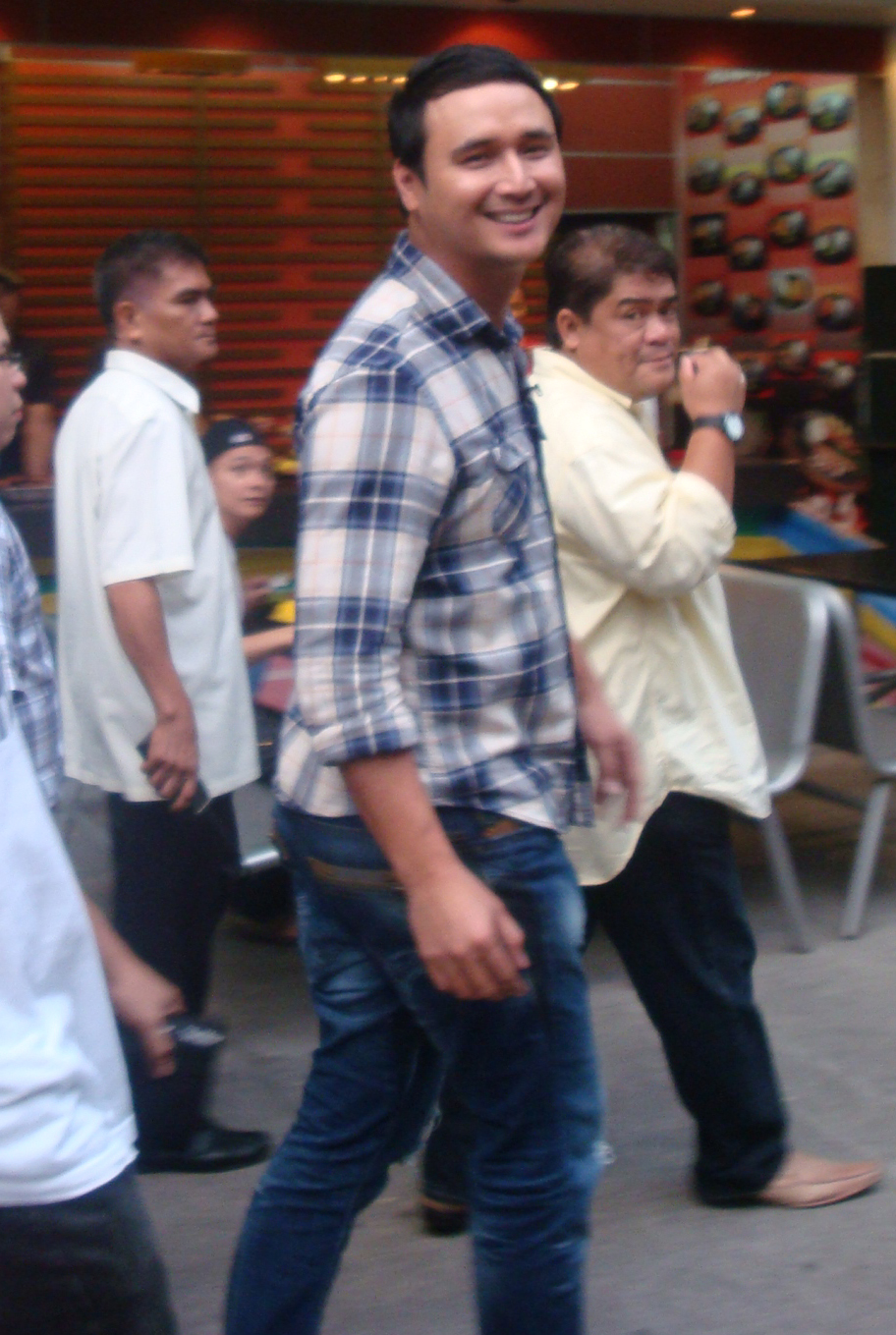
John Estrada portrays King Espinosa.

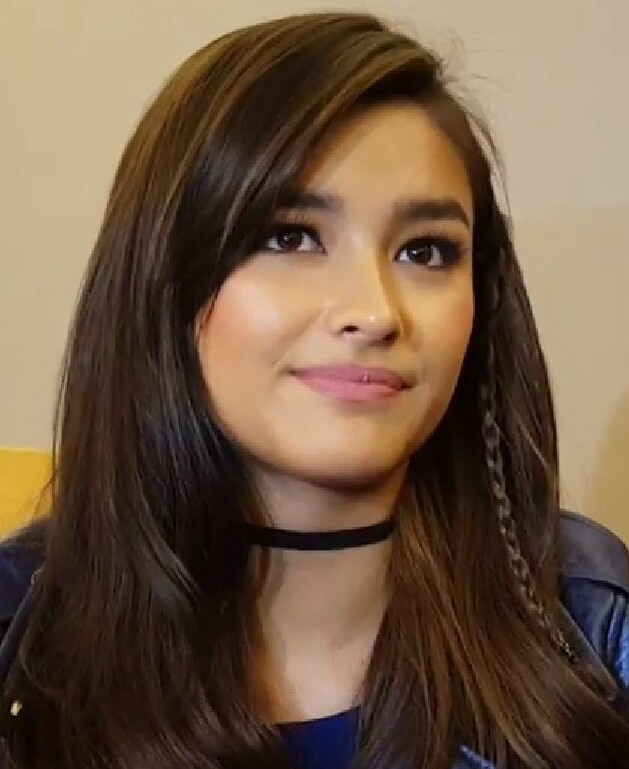
Liza Soberano portrays Angel Gomez.

- Kathryn Bernardo as Princess Patricia "Patchot" Espinosa
- Daniel Padilla as Ivan Lacson

=== Supporting cast ===
- John Estrada as King Espinosa
- Liza Soberano as Angel Gomez
- Kate Lintag as Keisha Gomez
- Arlene Muhlach as Gwen Martinez
- John Lapus as Tita Baby
- Kakai Bautista as Dolly
- Janus Del Prado as Gordo
- Paul Salas as Jake
- Sharlene San Pedro as Lavinia
- Ramon Christopher as Tito Conde
- Kit Thompson as Nicco
- Allan Paule as Mang Badong
- Miguel Morales as Bok
- Cris Gabriel Queg as Bibap

=== Cameo appearance ===
- G. Toengi as Patchot's Mother
- Enrique Gil as Dave (uncredited)
- Sofia Milla as young Patchot Espinosa
- Kyle Banzon as young Ivan Martinez
- Mia Necole Ramas as young Lavinia

== Production ==
=== Music ===
"Nasa Iyo Na Ang Lahat", an entry in the 2013 songwriting competition Himig Handog P-Pop Love Songs originally recorded by Daniel Padilla, was used as the film's theme song. A mid-tempo version of the song was recorded by Sam Milby, which it was used in the trailer of the film and was also played in the film.

== Release ==
=== Rating ===
The film was graded "B" by the Cinema Evaluation Board, and it received G rating by the MTRCB.

=== Critical reception ===
Jennifer Dugena of Philippine Entertainment Portal said Must Be.. Love was a recommended "perfect teen movie" and finished the review wrote, "Must Be Love is a rare film that is cute and light as much as it is serious and heavy, content-wise."

=== Box office ===
The film earned ₱61 million after almost 2 weeks of showing. This movie ended earning Php 113 million in the box-office.

== See also ==
- List of highest-grossing Filipino films in 2013
