= Nasa Iyo Na ang Lahat =

- Album cover for Himig Handog P-Pop Love Songs (2013) on which "Nasa Iyo Na ang Lahat" is included

Single by Daniel Padilla

from the album DJP
- Released: January 8, 2013
- Recorded: 2012
- Studio: Bellhaus
- Genre: Pop; OPM
- Length: 3:30
- Label: Star Music
- Songwriter: Jungee Marcelo
- Producer: Rox Santos

Daniel Padilla singles chronology
"Ako'y Sa'Yo, Ika'y Akin" (2013)	"Nasa Iyo Na ang Lahat" (2013)	"Kumusta Ka" (2013)

Audio sample
- file; help

Music video
- "Nasa Iyo Na ang Lahat" on YouTube

Nasa Iyo Na ang Lahat (lit. "You Have Everything" or "You Have It All") is a song recorded by Filipino actor and singer Daniel Padilla as the interpreter for the Philippines' Himig Handog (lit. "Song Offering") songwriting and music video competition in 2013. The song was written and composed by Jungee Marcelo. It was included on the 2013 compilation album Himig Handog P-Pop Love Songs. The digital album was made available for download on mymusicstore.com.ph on January 8, 2013, while on iTunes and Amazon on January 11. The physical album was released on January 17. The acoustic version was later included on his first studio album DJP and Best of ABS-CBN Summer Songs. The music video of the song was released on February 4, 2013.

From the Himig Handog competition final night, the song received almost all special awards including MOR Listeners’ Choice Award, ABS-CBN Subscriber's Choice Award. The song won 2013 ASAP Pop Viewers Choice Awards for Pop Song, and earned nomination for Pop Music Video. The song also earned nomination at the 2014 MYX Music Awards for Favorite Song and 2013 PMPC Star Awards for Music for Song of the Year.

== Background and composition ==
The theme of the Himig Handog 2013 contest was P-Pop Love Songs: Mga Awit at Kwento ng Pusong Pilipino (lit. P-Pop Love Songs: The Songs and Stories of Filipino Hearts). It was held at the Mall of Asia Arena on February 24, 2013. The competition consists of twelve finalists selected from the 2,500 songs submitted during the auditions. "Nasa Iyo Na Ang Lahat" written by Jungee Marcelo was one of the twelve finalists. The interpreter of the song decided by written and music company, that's how Daniel Padilla sang the song.

Musically, the song is already catchy and bubbly – reminiscent of a Jason Mraz song – not to mention sweet and feel-good. Lyrically it tells about how the person he loves so much has everything he would ever look for in a girl and how when they're together that he feel like the luckiest person in the world. Even though they've been together for a long time he still gets chills from when he sees her and he will always be loyal to her no matter what happens because she has chosen him and he has chosen her. The music video for "Nasa Iyo Na ang Lahat" was released on February 4, 2013, produced by Ateneo De Manila University (ADMU). A ballad version sung by Sam Milby was used as a theme song for the film Must Be... Love.

== Accolades ==
The song was voted MOR Listener's Choice, Tambayan 101.9 Listener's Choice, Star Records CD Buyer's Choice and the MYX Choice for Best Video. The song won 2013 ASAP Pop Viewers Choice Awards for Pop Song, and earned nomination for Pop Music Video. The song also earned nomination at the 2014 MYX Music Awards for Favorite Song and 2013 PMPC Star Awards for Music for Song of the Year.

== Credits ==
- Star Music – executive producer
- Rox B. Santos – producer
- Daniel Padilla – vocals
- Jungee Marcelo – lyricist and composer

== Release history ==
Country	Release date	Format
Philippines	January 8, 2013	Digital download
Worldwide	January 11, 2013	Digital download
Worldwide	April 16, 2013	Digital download
Worldwide	2015	Digital download

== See also ==
- Simpleng Tulad Mo
