= Hinahanap-Hanap Kita =

Song by Rivermaya

Single by Rivermaya

from the album Atomic Bomb
- Released: 1997
- Recorded: 1996
- Genre: Funk rock
- Length: 6:03
- Label: Musiko Records & BMG Records (Pilipinas) Inc.
- Songwriter: Rico Blanco
- Producers: Chito S. Roño & Lizza G. Nakpil

Rivermaya singles chronology
| "Panahon Na Naman" (1996) | "Hinahanap-Hanap Kita" (1997) | "Elesi" (1997) |

"Hinahanap-Hanap Kita" (lit. 'Constantly Yearning For You') is a song recorded by Filipino rock band Rivermaya in 1997. It was released as the first single from their third album Atomic Bomb.

== Reception ==
David Gonzales from AllMusic wrote that "Hinahanap-hanap Kita" ("Always Looking for You") and "Kung Ayaw Mo, Huwag Mo" ("If You Don't Like, Then Don't") are geared towards Filipino pop, and were hit singles for the band.

== Daniel Padilla version ==
"Hinahanap-Hanap Kita"

Single by Daniel Padilla

from the album Daniel Padilla
- Released: April 20, 2012
- Genre: Pop
- Length: 4:04
- Label: Star Music
- Songwriter: Rico Blanco
- Producers: ABS-CBN Film Productions, Inc. Rox B. Santos

Daniel Padilla singles chronology
| "Hinahanap-Hanap Kita" (2012) | "Prinsesa" (2012) |

Audio sample
- file; help

In 2012, Filipino actor Daniel Padilla covered "Hinahanap-Hanap Kita" as his debut single which was released online on April 20, 2012 as a radio single. It is included on his self-titled debut EP, Daniel Padilla, released on May 27, 2012. It also featured in his prime-time show Princess and I and on its soundtrack Love Songs from Princess and I which was released on June 15, 2012.

=== Background ===
"Hinahanap-Hanap Kita" was the first commercial digital single released from Padilla's self-titled debut EP, which was released on April 20, 2012. The song became a mainstream radio hit, and was also used as one of the theme songs of ABS-CBN's television series, Princess and I, in which he had a lead role alongside Kathryn Bernardo. It was adopted as well for a television commercial of Whisper.

== Other versions ==
The song has been covered by Regine Velasquez (2003), Sitti (2007), Jolina Magdangal and Dennis Trillo (2009), Rey Cantong (2014), Harana (2017), Jona (2019) and Julie Anne San Jose (2023).

== Personnel ==
- Bamboo Mañalac: lead vocals
- Rico Blanco: guitars, backing vocals
- Nathan Azarcon: bass
- Mark Escueta: drums
