= DJP (album) =

Studio album by Daniel Padilla
- Released: April 11, 2013
- Recorded: 2013
- Genre: Pop, OPM
- Length: 39:01
- Language: Tagalog
- Label: Star Records
- Producer: Rox Santos

Daniel Padilla chronology
Daniel Padilla (2012)	DJP (2013)	I Heart You (2014)

Singles from DJP
- 1. "Kumusta Ka" Released: March 18, 2013

Music Videos
- "Kumusta Ka (Official Lyric Video)" on YouTube
- "Nasa Iyo Na Ang Lahat" on YouTube

DJP is the debut studio album of Filipino actor and singer Daniel Padilla. It was first released digitally on April 11, 2013 under Star Records. The physical album was launched on April 16, 2013 at the SM North’s The Block.

DJP reached platinum status on April 16, 2013 with over 20,000 copies sold in less than 24 hours, and was certified double platinum on September 26, 2013. The album won three awards at three different award ceremonies; the 27th Awit Awards, PMPC Star Awards for Music and MOR Pinoy Music Awards for Best Selling Album of the Year, Pop Album of the Year and Album of the Year, respectively.

== Background ==
The album followed his 2012 eponymous debut extended play Daniel Padilla and his first film in a lead role, Must Be... Love.

=== Composition ===
The album consists of ten tracks and a bonus track. It also includes an acoustic version of "Nasa Iyo Na Ang Lahat" written by Jungee Marcelo, which Padilla interpreted at the 2013 Himig Handog: P-Pop Love Songs contest and became a popular hit in the Philippines. It also won several awards including MOR Listener’s Choice, Tambayan 101.9 Listener’s Choice, Star Records CD Buyer’s Choice and the MYX Choice for Best Video.

== Promotion and reception ==
The DJP album was launched on April 16, 2013 at the SM North's The Block and made available in various music stores nationwide. According to TV Producer Jinky Fabelico, DJP album turn Platinum in less than 24 hours, this announcement was made through his official Twitter account on April 17, 2013. But according to PARI, this album officially received platinum on September 25, 2013 and the next day received Double Platinum

DJP peaked at number 1 on Odyssey Music & Video’s nationwide sales reports (overall). The album won three awards at three different awarding ceremony for album category, including 27th Awit Awards, PMPC Star Awards for Music and MOR Pinoy Music Awards for Best Selling Album of The year, Pop Album of the Year and Album of The Year respectively.

=== Mall shows ===
Padilla held "Grand Fans Day" on May 12, 2013 at SM Skydome to thank his fans for his latest album and concert .

=== Singles ===
- "Kamusta Ka" was released on March 18, 2013 as the album's lead single. A lyric video of the song was uploaded on Star Record's YouTube account. It was first appeared in My Music Store Philippines by dominating the Digital Singles Chart for three consecutive weeks in April 2013.

== Track listing ==
DJP track listing
No.	Title	Writer(s)	Original performer(s)	Length
1.	"Kung Saan Ka Masaya"	Jungee Marcelo	original track	4:09
2.	"Sabay Natin"	Jonathan Manalo; Rox Santos	original track	3:31
3.	"Panalangin"	Jim Paredes	APO Hiking Society	3:27
4.	"Binibini"	Joseph Lansang	The Rainmakers	3:58
5.	"Kumusta Ka"	Rey Valera	Rey Valera	3:02
6.	"Naaalala"	Densho Biala	original track	3:58
7.	"Kisapmata"	Rico Blanco	Rivermaya	4:49
8.	"Ipagpatawad Mo"	Joey de Leon; Vic Sotto	VST & Company	3:22
9.	"Sisikat Din Ako"	Marcelo	original track	4:01
10.	"Nasa Iyo Na ang Lahat"	Paredes	Rico J. Puno	3:23
Total length:				38:56

Bonus tracks
No.	Title	Writer(s)	Length
11.	"Diskarte"	RJ Jimenez	3:04

== Charts ==
=== Weekly charts ===
Chart (2013)	Peak
Odyssey Music & Video	1

== Release history ==
Country	Format	Released date	Label
Worldwide	Digital download	April 11, 2013	Star Records
Philippines	CD	April 16, 2013	Star Records

== Certifications ==
Region	Certification	Certified units/sales
Philippines (PARI)	2× Platinum	30,000^{*}
^{*} Sales figures based on certification alone.
