= I Feel Good (album) =

Studio album by Daniel Padilla
- Released: June 13, 2015
- Genre: Pop, pop rock, OPM
- Length: 50:00
- Language: Tagalog, English
- Label: Star Music
- Producer: Roque "Rox" Santos

Daniel Padilla chronology
I Heart You (2014)	I Feel Good (2015)	Christmas Love Duets (2015)

Singles from I Feel Good
- 1. "I Got You (I Feel Good)" Released: June 13, 2015; 2. "Knocks Me Off My Feet" Released: January 1, 2015; 3. "Isn't She Lovely" Released: June 14, 2015; 4. "Ikaw ang Aking Mahal" Released: July 14, 2015

Music video
- "I Got You (I Feel Good)" on YouTube

I Feel Good is the third studio album of Filipino actor and singer Daniel Padilla under Star Records, released on June 13, 2015 in the Philippines. The album consists of thirteen tracks of covers such as James Brown's "I Got You (I Feel Good)" in which the album was named, Stevie Wonder's "Isn't She Lovely", James Taylor's "How Sweet It Is (To Be Loved by You)" and Andy Williams' "Moon River". Also included on the album are Padilla's versions of "Knocks Me Off My Feet", "For Once in My Life", "Morning Girl" and "Handog". The album also features his own version of "Ikaw ang Aking Mahal", "Pangako Sa 'Yo" (the theme song to his teleserye with Kathryn Bernardo), and "Simpleng Tulad Mo".

== Background and development ==
On June 3, 2015, Star Music revealed the cover of this album. I Feel Good premiered on the international music streaming service Spotify on June 7, 2015.

== Music video ==
The music video was shot on July 5, 2015 and was released on September 11, 2015 and premiered on Myx the same day. The music video debuted at No. 2 on the MYX Pinoy Countdown and at No. 5 at the MYX Hit Chart, then the following week peaked at No. 2 on both charts. The music video for "I Got You (I Feel Good)" ranked No. 19 on the Pinoy MYX Countdown 2015 Yearender.

== Promotion and reception ==
Padilla promoted the album during the Most Wanted concert. He performed some of the tracks from the album live, including "Isn't She Lovely", "How Sweet It Is (To Be Loved by You)", "Moon River" and "I Got You (I Feel Good)". Padilla kicked off the I Feel Good album tour at Starmall Alabang on August 2, 2015. The tour continued to the Bren Z Guiao Convention Center, City of San Fernando on August 22, 2015.

I Feel Good eventually reached gold status in less than a week. Padilla received the gold record award for I Feel Good from Star Music head Roxy Liquigan and the album producers on ASAP 20 on June 28, 2015. This album peaked at number one on Odyssey Music & Video's nationwide sales reports from July 27 to August 2, 2015.

The album earned a nomination at the 2016 PMPC Star Awards for Music for Pop Album of the Year and Cover Design of the Year. The title track, "I Got You (I Feel Good)" earned a nomination at the 2016 Myx Music Awards for Favorite Remake, while Padilla was nominated for Male Pop Artist of the Year.

== Track listing ==
No.	Title	Lyrics	Music	Length
1.	"Prelude (Intro)"			1:46
2.	"I Got You (I Feel Good)"	James Brown	James Brown	2:50
3.	"My Girl"	Ronald White, William "Smokey" Robinson Jr.	Ronald White, William "Smokey" Robinson Jr.	3:06
4.	"Isn't She Lovely"	Stevie Wonder	Stevie Wonder	3:03
5.	"Knocks Me Off My Feet"	Stevie Wonder	Stevie Wonder	3:46
6.	"For Once in My Life"	Orlando Murden, Ronald Miller	Orlando Murden, Ronald Miller	3:33
7.	"How Sweet It Is (To Be Loved by You)"	Brain Holland, Edward Jr. Patrick, Lamont Dozier	Brain Holland, Edward Jr. Patrick, Lamont Dozier	4:12
8.	"Morning Girl"	Tupper Saussy	Tupper Saussy	2:46
9.	"Moon River"	Henry Mancini, Johnny Mercer	Henry Mancini, Johnny Mercer	3:45
10.	"Ikaw ang Aking Mahal"	Joey de Leon	Vicente Sotto III, Spanky Rigor	3:26
11.	"Handog"	Florante de Leon	Florante de Leon	3:50
12.	"Pangako Sa'yo"	Rey Valera		3:15
13.	"Simpleng Tulad Mo"	Meljohn Magno	Meljohn Magno	3:45
Total length:				50:00

== Personnel ==
- Malou N. Santos & Roxy Liquigan – executive producers
- Roque "Rox" Santos – overall album producer
- Jonathan Manalo – A&R/audio content head
- Raizo Chabeldin – associate producer
- Jayson Sarmiento – promo specialist
- Jholina Luspo – promo associate
- Marivic Benedicto – Star Song Inc. and New Media head
- Regie Sandel – sales and distribution
- Beth Faustio – music publishing officer
- Eaizen Almazan – New Media technical assistant
- Abbey Aledo – music servicing officer
- Marc Nicdao – photographer
- Ton Lao – stylist
- Ryan Ko – make-up artist
- Christine Joy L. Cheng – design and layout
- Andrew Castillo – creative head
- Dante Tonedo – album master

== Weekly charts ==
Chart (2013)	Peak position
Odyssey Music & Video	1

== Release history ==
Country	Format	Released date	Label	Certifications
Worldwide	Digital download	June 7, 2015	Star Music	
Philippines	CD	June 13, 2015	Star Music	PARI: Gold; Received: June 26, 2015
