= Daniel Padilla (EP) =

EP by Daniel Padilla
- Released: May 27, 2012
- Recorded: February – April 2012
- Genres: Pop, OPM
- Length: 40:39
- Languages: English, Tagalog
- Label: Star Records
- Producer: Rox B. Santos

Daniel Padilla chronology
| Daniel Padilla (2012) | DJP (2013) |

Singles from "Daniel Padilla"
- 1. "Hinahanap-Hanap Kita" Released: April 20, 2012; 2. "Prinsesa" Released: August 24, 2012; 3. "Ako'y Sa'Yo, Ika'y Akin" Released: October 25, 2012

Music video
- "Prinsesa" on YouTube

Daniel Padilla is the self-titled EP under Star Records released on May 27, 2012, in the Philippines in CD and Digital formats. It also became available in iTunes, Amazon and the Philippines' official music downloading cite, My Music Store Philippines, same day of physical distribution release.

The album topped all major music and video retailers in the Philippines both in physical and digital distribution, despite initial doubts about releasing an album for Padilla. Some people even questioned the decision to release early on. But the album still managed to sell 8,000 copies in just a week of release and received gold certificate by PARI. In addition, the album turned platinum (15,000) after a month of selling. The consistency of strong sales continued that cause it to stay couple of months in top 20 of ‘’Odyssey’’ and ‘’Astroplus’’ according to Star Records Insider. As of February 2013, the album was certified double platinum.

== Background ==
The first recording session of making the album was turned into surprise when Padilla walked in the recording studio on time at exactly 8:30pm, straight from taping. Padilla and Jonathan Manalo first recorded ‘’tinatago-tago ako’’. But Manalo said, instead of going into the booth and recording. Padilla requested him twice to play first the song referring to the demo recording of Rivermaya. Padilla sang the whole song, but made helpful suggestions on how the arrangements could be made to better suit his voice. Adding that ‘’this is a kid who knows his music’’, Manalo said. However, notions on how this records were driven the fan? Manalo added, Daniel is not totally lacking of vocal or musical skills. Padilla is more on influenced by Orient Pearl sound yet he brought young flavor on it, observed by him. Further, he knows his strengths in music and possesses good musical ears that fits him to define flat and sharp.

== Singles ==
The first commercial and digital single released from the album was ‘’Hinahanap-Hanap Kita’’ on April 20, 2012. It is originally recorded by Rivermaya. This became a mainstream hit in radios, receiving heavy rotation of airplay and being able to enter most top 5 of radio stations’ chart. It was also used as one of the theme songs of ABS-CBN's television series, Princess and I, in which he had a lead role alongside Kathryn Bernardo. Aside from that, it was adopted as well for a television commercial of Whisper. Part of its promotion run. After four months, he released the second single called, ‘’Prinsesa’’, that accompanied with a music video directed by Galileo Te released on September 24, 2012. ‘’Prinsesa’’ music video was peaked number 1 in Myx and same strength as the first single received in airplay. It also nominated in Myx Music Awards 2013 for ‘’Favorite Remake’’ but lost to Sarah Geronimo's Bakit Pa Ba?.

== Reception ==
This album won 26th Awit Awards for Best Selling Album of The Year.

== Track listing ==
| No. | Title | Writer(s) | Original Artist(s) | Length |
|---|---|---|---|---|
| 1. | "Hinahanap-hanap Kita" | R. Blanco | Rivermaya | 04:04 |
| 2. | "Pagsubok" | N. Padilla, J. Ong | Orient Pearl | 03:03 |
| 3. | "Paniwalaan Mo" | C. Ilacad, V. Sotto, J. de Leon | Bluejeans | 03:15 |
| 4. | "Ako’y Sa ‘Yo, Ika’y Akin" | J. Bunda | Iaxe | 05:12 |
| 5. | "Prinsesa" | M. Dizon, G. Jacinto | Teeth | 04:44 |
| 6. | "Grow Old With You" | T. Herlihy, A. Sandler | Adam Sandler | 02:30 |
| Total length: | | | | 40:39 |

- It included minus one versions on each track.

== Personnel ==
- Malou N. Santos & Roxy Liquigan – executive producers
- Rox B. Santos – over-all album producer
- Jonathan Manalo – audio content head
- Roxy Liquigan – star adprom head
- Gina Mauricio-Joyce – star adprom oic for audio
- Zyra Cuenco – promo specialist
- Marivic Benedicto – star song, inc and new media head
- Beth Faustino – music publishing officer
- Eaizen Almazan – new media technical assistant
- Jan Michael Ibañez – project coordinator
- Andrew Castillo – creative head
- Caryl de Jesus – album layout designer

== Certifications ==
| Country | Provider | Certification | Sales |
|---|---|---|---|
| Philippines | PARI | 2x Platinum | PHL sales: 30,000+ |
