= Simpleng Tulad Mo =

Single by Daniel Padilla

from the album Himig Handog Ppop Love Song (2014)
- Released: August 15, 2014
- Recorded: 2014; Bellhaus Studios
- Genre: Pop-rock; OPM
- Length: 3:45
- Label: Star Music
- Songwriter: MJ Magno
- Producer: Rox Santos

Daniel Padilla singles chronology
"I Heart You" (2014)	"Simpleng Tulad Mo" (2014)	"Unlimited and Free" (2014)

Music video
- "Simpleng Tulad Mo" on YouTube

"Simpleng Tulad Mo" ("Simple Like You") is a Filipino song recorded by actor and singer Daniel Padilla as the interpreter for the Philippines' Himig Handog: P-Pop Love Songs songwriting competition (2014). The song was included in the compilation album title, Himig Handog Ppop Love Song (2014) released on August 15, 2014, and was later included on his third studio album I Feel Good. The song was written and composed by Meljohn Magno.

"Simpleng Tulad Mo" was a commercial success in its native country, hit No. 2 at the MYX Hit Chart under Shake It Off of Taylor Swift and No. 1 at the Pinoy MYX Countdown. The song landed at No. 6 at the MYX Hit Chart year-end countdown and No. 1 at the Pinoy MYX Year-End Countdown. The song is the 9th of Spotify Philippines Top 10 Most Streamed Track 2014.

From the Himig Handog competition final night, the song won MOR Listeners' Choice Award and ABS-CBN Subscriber's Choice Award. "Simpleng Tuladmo won 2015 MYX Music Awards for Favorite Song.

The promotion and studio version of "Simpleng Tulad Mo" was performed at noontime variety show ASAP 19 and the morning lifestyle TV show Kris TV ahead of the grand-finals night.

== Background and composition ==
"Simpleng Tulad Mo"
"Simpleng Tulad Mo" using simple yet sincere lyrics tells about a man lost in his daydreams and wishful thoughts involving his beloved.

"Simpleng Tulad Mo" was written by Meljohn Magno to compete at the Philippines' song writing competition, Himig Handog. Songs created by participants are interpreted by local artists chosen by the songwriters and the recording company. Padilla was one of the youngest "interpreters" in the competition Lyrically, "Simpleng Tulad Mo" uses simple yet sincere lyrics to tell of a man lost in his daydreams and wishful thoughts involving his beloved.

== Promotion ==
The music video for "Simpleng Tulad Mo" was released on August 29, 2014. Directed by Polytechnic University of the Philippines. It tells the story of lyric, started from Padilla sitting on a couch with his guitar music then whispers in his ears, and a song has been created.

To promote "Simpleng Tuladmo" Daniel Padilla made several appearances on Philippines music programs around 2014. He performed the song for the first time on ABS-CBN's ASAP 19 on September 21, 2014.

== Commercial performance ==
"Simpleng Tuladmo" debuted at number 4 on the MYX Hit Chart and the next week charted at number 2 for four weeks, starting the week of September 14 – 20 into the week of October 5–11, 2014. While on the Pinoy MYX Countdown this song debut at number 2 and was peaked atop the next week for five-week. This song is the 6th of Pinoy MYX Year-end Countdown 2014, and at number nine On Spotify Top 10 Most Streamed OPM Artists of the year in Philippinese.

From the Himig Handog competition final night based on fan vote, the song received two special awards including MOR Listeners' Choice Award and ABS-CBN Subscriber's Choice Award. "Simpleng Tulad Mo" won 2015 MYX Music Awards for Favorite Song, and earned nomination for Favorite Mellow Video

== Credits ==
Credits adapted from description of official Music Video on YouTube

- Star Music – executive producer
- Rox B. Santos – producer
- Tom Coyne – mastering engineer
- Dan Tañedo – recording engineer
- Dante Tañedo – mastering and mixing engineer
- Tommy Katigbak – live bass & guitar
- Janno Queyquep – additional guitars
- Daniel Padilla – vocals
- Daryl Reyes – background vocals
- Rox Santos – back-up vocals
- Meljohn Magno – lyricist and composer
- Teddy Katigbak – arranger

== Charts ==
=== Weekly charts ===
Chart (2014)	Peak position
Pinoy MYX Countdown	1
MYX Hit Chart	2

=== Year-end charts ===
Chart (2014)	Position
Pinoy MYX Year-End Countdown Chart	6
Spotify's Most Stream OPM Track	9

== Release history ==
Country	Release date	Format
Philippines	August 15, 2014	Digital download, Contemporary hit radio
Worldwide	June 7, 2015	Digital download,
