= List of roles and awards of Liza Soberano =

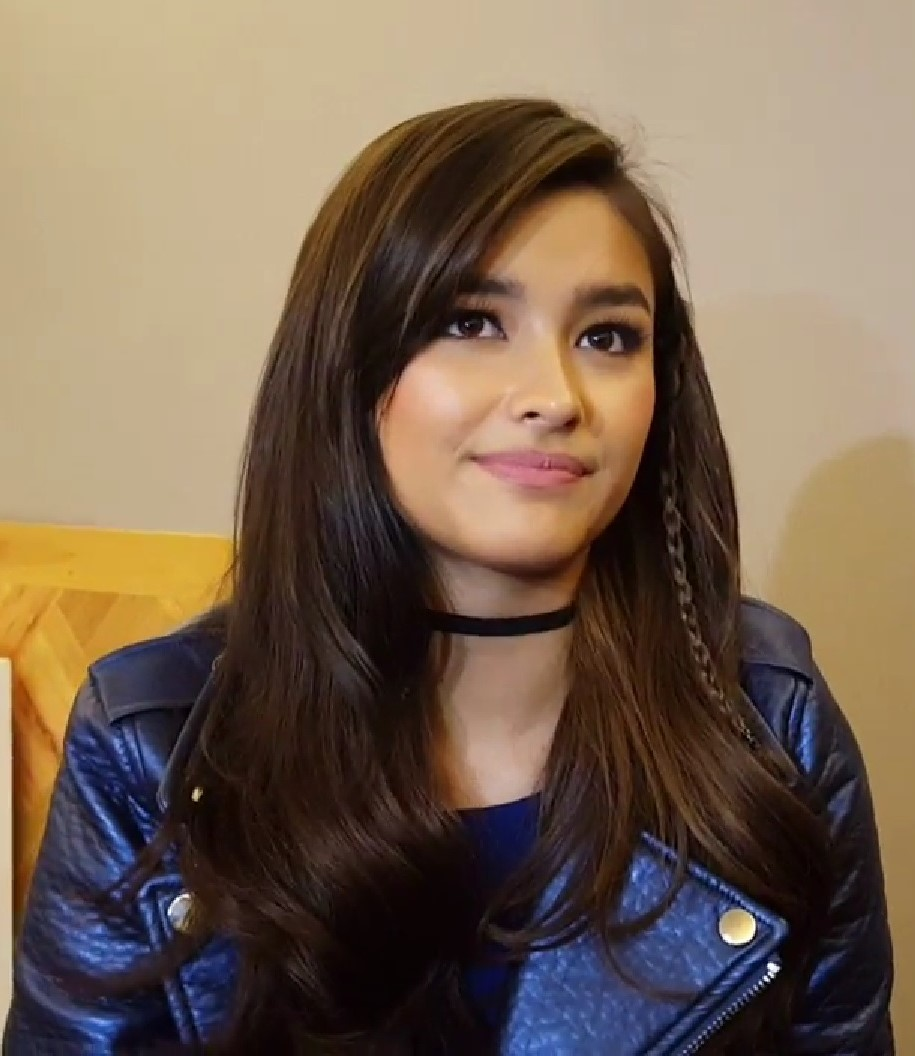
Soberano in 2016

Filipino and American actress Liza Soberano has received many accolades for her work in film and television. She began her career as a teenager with a minor role in a 2011 episode of the ABS-CBN fantasy anthology series Wansapanataym, followed by a supporting role in the afternoon drama series Kung Ako'y Iiwan Mo, for which she was nominated for a PMPC Star Award for Best Female New TV Personality. For much of 2013, she played third wheel roles in films—the coming-of-age romantic comedy Must Be... Love and the comedy-drama She's the One. Her breakthrough role came in the second season of romantic drama television series Got to Believe (2014), and played as the love interest of Daniel Padilla's character, alongside Kathryn Bernardo.

In 2014, Soberano landed her first lead role, opposite Enrique Gil, in the romantic drama television series Forevermore, for which she received the award for Most Promising Female Star at the 2015 Box Office Entertainment Awards. Her profile increased with two roles in commercially successful romantic comedies of 2015 which co-starred Gil. She played an unattractive exchange student in Just the Way You Are, and a woman conflicted by her feelings for two men in Everyday I Love You. Her role as a young aristocrat in the romantic drama series Dolce Amore (2016) garnered Soberano a nomination for the Star Award for Best Drama Actress. Critical success followed with her performance of a weblog writer on a job assignment with an ex-boyfriend in Cathy Garcia-Molina's drama film My Ex and Whys (2017). It became her highest-grossing release, and earned her the Box Office Entertainment Award for Box Office Queen. That same year, she took on the role of Miss Universe 2015 winner Pia Wurtzbach in a biographical episode of the drama anthology series Maalaala Mo Kaya.

For her portrayal of a tribal heroine in the epic fantasy television series Bagani (2018), Soberano was nominated for a Star Award for Best Drama Actress. She then starred in Antoinette Jadaone's drama film Alone/Together, which earned her two wins at the 2020 Box Office Entertainment Awards—Princess of Philippine Movies and Television and Most Popular Loveteam for Movies. She also starred as a struggling migrant worker in Dubrovnik in the romantic drama television series Make It with You (2020). Soberano debuted as a voice actress in the role of titular protagonist on the Netflix animated series Trese (2021), about a detective who deals with crimes of supernatural origin. In 2024, Soberano made her Hollywood debut in Zelda Williams's comedy horror film Lisa Frankenstein, and also debuted as a presenter at the Crunchyroll Anime Awards in Japan.

== Filmography ==
=== Film ===
Key
†	Denotes films that have not yet been released

Liza Soberano's film credits with year of release, film titles and roles
Year	Title	Role	Notes	Ref
2013	Must Be... Love	Angel Gomez		
2013	She's the One	Gillian		
2015	Just the Way You Are	Sophia Taylor		
2015	Everyday I Love You	Audrey Locsin		
2017	My Ex and Whys	Calixta "Cali" Ferrer		
2019	Alone/Together	Christine "Tin" Lazaro		
2024	Lisa Frankenstein	Taffy		
2026	Forgotten Island	Raissa	Voice role	
TBA	Patron Saints of Nothing †	Mia		

=== Television ===
Key
†	Denotes shows that have not yet been aired

Liza Soberano's television credits with year of release, title(s) and role
Year	Title	Role	Notes	Ref
2011	Wansapanataym	Mac	Episode: "Mac-Ulit-Ulit"	
2012	Kung Ako'y Iiwan Mo	Claire Raymundo	Credited as Hope Soberano	
2012	Maalaala Mo Kaya	Young Gladys	Episode: "Singsing"	
2013	Wansapanataym	Dahlia	Episode: "Flores de Mayo"	
2013	Maalaala Mo Kaya	Una	Episode: "Box"	
2013–2014	Got to Believe	Alexa "Alex" Rodrigo		
2013–2021	ASAP	Herself	Host	
2014	Maalaala Mo Kaya	Aileen	Episode: "Orasan"	
2014–2015	Forevermore	Maria Agnes Calay	Lead role	
2016	Dolce Amore	Serena Marchesa	Lead role	
2017	Maalaala Mo Kaya	Pia Wurtzbach	Episode: "Korona"	
2018	Bagani	Ganda	Lead role	
2020	Make It with You	Belinda "Billy" Dimaguiba	Lead role	
2021	Trese	Alexandra Trese (voice)	Animated series; lead role	
2026	Sun Chaser †	Angie (voice)	Animated series; supporting role	
2026	Sun Chaser †	Queen Marisol (voice)	Animated series; supporting role	

== Discography ==
Liza Soberano's song credits
Year	Soundtrack	Song	Label	Ref
2015	Just the Way You Are	"With You in My Life"	Star Music	n
2018	Dolce Amore	"Kung Di Magkatagpo" (with Enrique Gil)	Star Music	
2018	Dolce Amore	"Spark"	Star Music	
2026	Forgotten Island	"BRB" (with H.E.R.)	Back Lot Music	

== Music video ==
Liza Soberano's music video appearances
Year	Title	Performer(s)	Director	Album	Ref
2019	"Estella"	Philia	Arci Muñoz, Jeremy Abano	Philia	
2021	"The Baddest"	BGYO	Amiel Kirby Guevara Balagtas	The Light	
2026	"BRB"	H.E.R. and Liza Soberano	H.E.R., Bianca Catbagan	Forgotten Island (soundtrack)	

== Podcast ==
Liza Soberano's podcast appearances
Year	Title	Role	Notes	Ref
2022	An Open Mind with Liza Soberano	Host	12 episodes	

== Awards and nominations ==
Awards and nominations received by Liza Soberano
Award	Year (Note: Indicates the year of ceremony. Each year is linked to the article about the awards held that year, wherever possible.)	Recipient(s) and nominee(s)	Category	Result	Ref
Awit Awards	2017	"Spark"	Best Performance by a New Female Recording Artist	Nominated	
Box Office Entertainment Awards	2015	Forevermore	Most Promising Female Star of the Year	Won	
Box Office Entertainment Awards	2016	Forevermore	Most Popular Love Team of Movies and TV (Note: Shared with Enrique Gil)	Won	
Box Office Entertainment Awards	2017	Dolce Amore	Most Popular Love Team of the Year	Won	
Box Office Entertainment Awards	2018	My Ex and Whys	Box Office Queen	Won	
Box Office Entertainment Awards	2020	Alone/Together	Princess of Philippine Movies and Television	Won	
Box Office Entertainment Awards	2020	Alone/Together	Most Popular Loveteam for Movies	Won	
FAMAS Awards	2020	Liza Soberano	German Moreno Youth Achievement Award	Won	
Kids Choice Awards	2019	Liza Soberano	Favorite Trending Pinoy	Nominated	
Star Awards for Movies	2014	Must Be... Love	New Movie Actress of the Year	Nominated	
Star Awards for Movies	2016	Everyday I Love You	Movie Love Team of the Year	Nominated	
Star Awards for Television	2013	Kung Ako'y Iiwan Mo	Best Female New TV Personality	Nominated	
Star Awards for Television	2015	Liza Soberano	German Moreno Power Tandem Award	Won	
Star Awards for Television	2016	Dolce Amore	Best Drama Actress	Nominated	
Star Awards for Television	2018	Bagani	Best Drama Actress	Nominated	
