= Box Office Entertainment Award for Phenomenal Box Office Star =

Philippine entertainment award

- Awarded for: Attaining the Highest Grossing Film of All Time
- Country: Philippines
- Presented by: Guillermo Mendoza Memorial Scholarship Foundation
- First award: 2012
- Currently held by: Marian Rivera & Dingdong Dantes

The following are the Phenomenal Box Office Star Awards given by the Box Office Entertainment Awards.

== Phenomenal Box Office Star ==
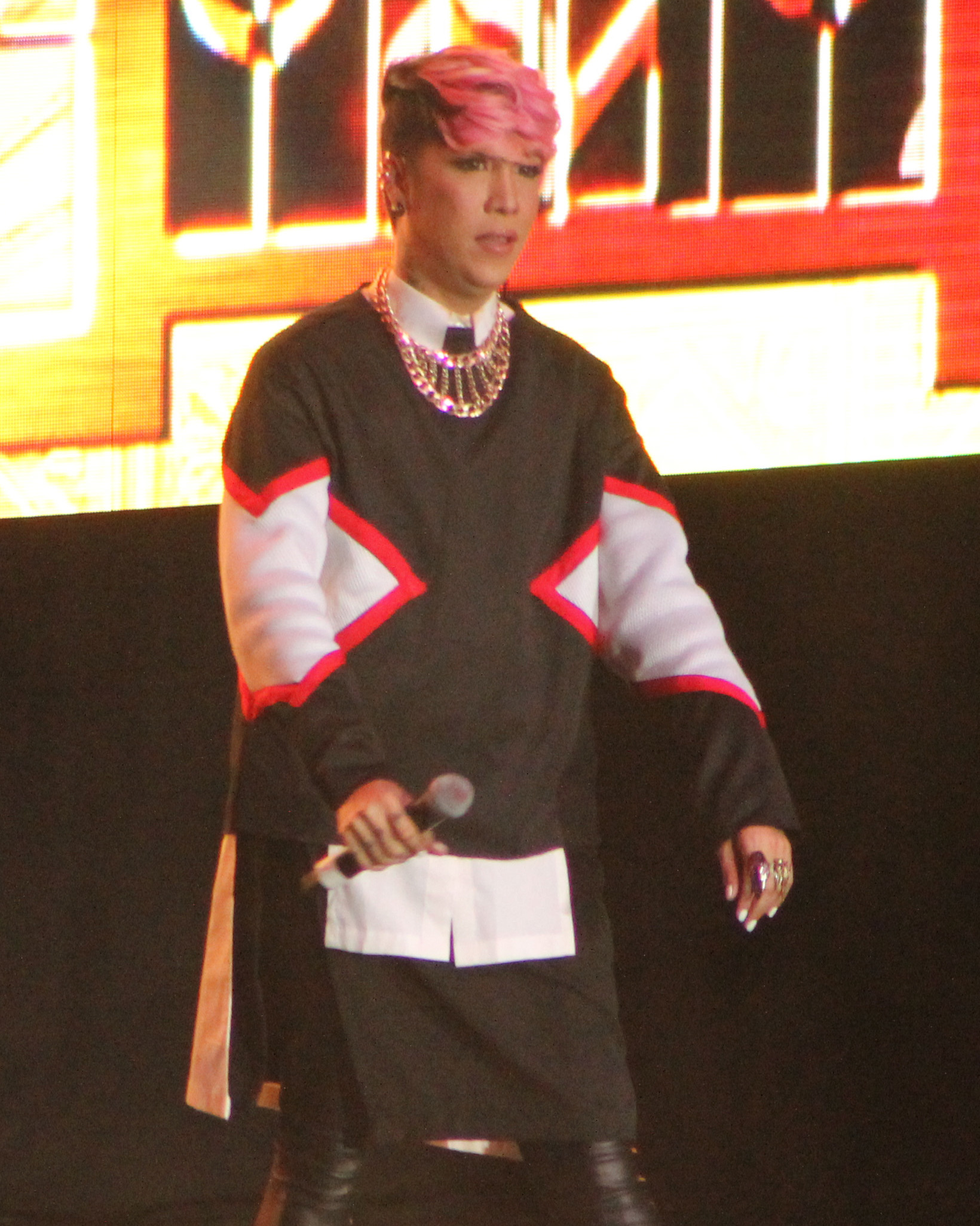
Vice Ganda has won this award for seven consecutive years since 2012.

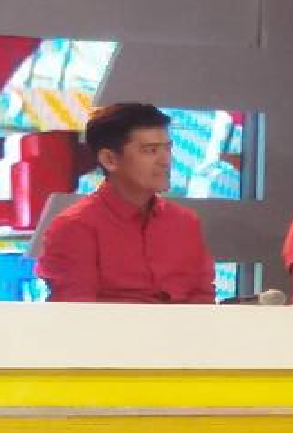
Vic Sotto tied with Vice Ganda in 2014 for My Little Bossings.

The Box Office Entertainment Award for Phenomenal Box Office Star is the highest-acclaimed award presented annually by the Memorial Scholarship Foundation, led by Corazon Samaniego. It was first awarded at the 43rd Box Office Entertainment Awards ceremony, held in 2012; Vice Ganda first received the award for his work The Unkabogable Praybeyt Benjamin which grossed PHP 332,000,000.00 and was the highest grossing Filipino film of year 2011.

The first title holder of this award, Vice Ganda, retains his reign up to now by receiving the award for 8 consecutive years.

Year	Actor	Film	Role	Ref
2012 (43rd)	Vice Ganda	The Unkabogable Praybeyt Benjamin	Benjamin "Benjie" Santos VIII	
2013 (44th)	Vice Ganda	Sisterakas	Bernardo "Totoy Bernice" Laurel Sabroso	
2013 (44th)	Kris Aquino	Sisterakas	Roxanne Celine Hermosa	
2013 (44th)	Ai-Ai delas Alas	Sisterakas	Bernadette "Detty" Sabroso-Maningas	
2014 (45th)	Vice Ganda	Girl, Boy, Bakla, Tomboy	Girlie/Peter/Mark Jill/Panying Jackstone	
2014 (45th)	Vic Sotto	My Little Bossings	Victor "Torky" Villanueva	
2015 (46th)	Vice Ganda	The Amazing Praybeyt Benjamin	Benjamin "Benjie" Santos VIII	
2016 (47th)	Vice Ganda	Beauty and the Bestie	Natalia Thalia Nutreila / Erik "Erika" Villavicencio	
2016 (47th)	Coco Martin	Beauty and the Bestie	Emman Castillo	
2016 (47th)	Bea Alonzo	A Second Chance	Basha Belinda "Bash" Eugenio-Gonzales	
2016 (47th)	John Lloyd Cruz	A Second Chance	Rodolfo "Popoy" Gonzales	
2017 (48th)	Vice Ganda	The Super Parental Guardians	Ariel "Arci Taulava" Ciriaco	
2017 (48th)	Coco Martin	The Super Parental Guardians	Neil "Paco" Nabati	
2018 (49th)	Vice Ganda	Gandarrapiddo: The Revenger Squad	Emerson "Emy" Mariposque / Gandarra	
2018 (49th)	Daniel Padilla	Gandarrapiddo: The Revenger Squad	Chino Mariposque / Rappido	
2018 (49th)	Pia Wurtzbach	Gandarrapiddo: The Revenger Squad	Cassandra Stockings / Cassandra "Cassey" Mariposque / Kweenie	
2019 (50th)	Vice Ganda	Fantastica	Belat	
2019 (50th)	Richard Gutierrez	Fantastica	Prince Pryce	
2019 (50th)	Dingdong Dantes	Fantastica	Dong Nam	
2019 (50th)	Kathryn Bernardo	The Hows of Us	Georgina "George" Silva	
2019 (50th)	Daniel Padilla	The Hows of Us	Primo Alvarez	
2020 (51st)	Kathryn Bernardo	Hello, Love, Goodbye	Joy Marie Fabregas	
2020 (51st)	Alden Richards	Hello, Love, Goodbye	Ethan Del Rosario	
2024 (52nd)	Dingdong Dantes	Rewind	John Nuñez	
2024 (52nd)	Marian Rivera	Rewind	Mary Nuñez	
2025 (53rd)	Kathryn Bernardo	Hello, Love, Again	Joy Marie del Rosario	
2025 (53rd)	Alden Richards	Hello, Love, Again	Ethan del Rosario	

=== Multiple awards for Phenomenal Box Office Star ===
The following is a list of actors/actresses who received more than one Phenomenal Box Office Star Award.

Actor	Record Set
Vice Ganda	8
Kathryn Bernardo	3
Coco Martin	2
Daniel Padilla	2
Alden Richards	2
Dingdong Dantes	2

== Phenomenal Box Office King and Queen ==
The Box Office Entertainment Award for Phenomenal Box Office King and Queen are awards presented by the Guillermo Mendoza Scholarship Foundation, led by Corazon Samaniego. It was first awarded at the 53rd Box Office Entertainment Awards in 2025, where Kathryn Bernardo and Alden Richards received the first awards title for their movie in Hello, Love, Again which grosses over 1.6 billion pesos in local box office becoming the first Philippines movie to gross over 1 billion pesos and the current highest grossing Filipino movie of all time.

Year	Actor	Film	Role	Ref
2025 (53rd)	Alden Richards	Hello, Love, Again	Ethan del Rosario	
2025 (53rd)	Kathyrn Bernardo	Hello, Love, Again	Joy Marie del Rosario	

== Phenomenal Box Office Tandem ==
The Box Office Entertainment Award for Phenomenal Box Office Tandem is an award presented by the Memorial Scholarship Foundation, led by Corazon Samaniego. It was first awarded at the 45th Box Office Entertainment Awards ceremony, held in 2012; actors Vic Sotto & Ai Ai delas Alas first received the award for their work Enteng ng Ina Mo.

Year	Actor	Film	Role	Ref
2011 (43rd)	Vic Sotto	Enteng ng Ina Mo	Enteng Kabisote	
2011 (43rd)	Ai Ai delas Alas	Enteng ng Ina Mo	Ina Montecillo	

== Phenomenal Box Office Child Star ==
The Box Office Entertainment Award for Phenomenal Box Office Child Star is an award presented by the Memorial Scholarship Foundation, led by Corazon Samaniego. It was first awarded at the 45th Box Office Entertainment Awards ceremony, held in 2014; Bimby Aquino Yap & Ryzza Mae Dizon first received the award for their work My Little Bossings which grossed PHP 401,000,000.00 and was the 2nd highest grossing Filipino film of year 2013.

Year	Actor	Film	Role	Ref
2013 (45th)	Bimby Aquino Yap	My Little Bossings	Justin "Tintoy" Atienza	
2013 (45th)	Ryzza Mae Dizon	My Little Bossings	Ching Villanueva	
