= Kim Idol =

Filipino comedian and writer (1979–2020)

- Born: Michael Argente; March 30, 1979; Santa Ana, Manila, Philippines
- Died: July 13, 2020 (aged 41); Caloocan City
- Occupations: Comedian, host, writer
- Years active: 2003–2020

Michael Argente (March 30, 1979 – July 13, 2020), known professionally as Kim Idol, was a Filipino stand-up comedian, host and writer.

== Early life ==
Argente was born on March 30, 1979 to Nestor Eusebio Argente and Maria Carranza Taniegra. He was the second of three siblings. He was a native of Santa Ana, Manila.

== Career ==
Aside from being a co-host of Eat Bulaga!, Kim Idol also writes material for popular Filipino comedians such as the shows Poohkwang, Da Spooftacular Showdown and My Poohlish Heart where he also directed, conceptualized and wrote them. These were aired on Music Museum and were produced by ABS-CBN's ASAP XV.

Aside from appearing on television every day, he also performs nightly at comedy bars in the Philippines, a fact that made him the youngest Golden Book Awardee of The Library, the only Sing-Along bar that honors Sing-Along Masters in the Philippines. He won "Entertainer of the Year 2004".

=== Concert ===
In 2005, he flew to Europe with the only Concert Queen of the Philippines, Pops Fernandez, to perform in Vienna Austria, Milano Italy, Copenhagen Denmark, Stockholm Sweden and Munich Germany. In 2007, she returned with Sarah Geronimo and Mark Bautista. He has also performed in the Middle East and several countries in Asia, even in Australia (Melbourne and Sydney).

== Personal life ==
In 2015, Idol revealed his medical condition with symptoms of severe headache, bumping into walls due to loss of his right periphery vision. His friends brought him to the hospital and CT-Scan revealed some bleeding on areas of his brain.

On July 9, 2020, Idol collapsed while working as a marshal on duty of the Bureau of Quarantine at the Philippine Arena where COVID-19 patients were on quarantine. He was rushed at Manila Central University Hospital in Caloocan City. He died on July 13, 2020 due to Arteriovenous Malformation (AVM).

== Filmography ==
=== Television ===
- (2005) - Pops' Singing is Awesome
- (2009) - Eat Bulaga
- (2008) - PoohKwang
- (2011) - Gandang Gabi, Vice! - (writer in 6 episodes)
- (2017) - Full House Tonight Live!
- (2017) - Meant to Be -Shala (1 episode)
- (2018) - Wowowin

=== Movie ===
- (2009) - Love On Line - Nurse
- (2009) - My Darling Ghost - Call Center Applicant
- (2016) - The Super Parental Guardians - Brgy. Captain
- (2017) - Woke Up like This - Judge

=== Comedy shows ===
Stage Shows credits

- (2008) - Poohkwang - Writer
- (2008) - D' Spooftacular Showdown - Writer
- (2010) - My Poohlish Heart - Writer and Director
- (2010) - Endangered Species - Writer
- (2010) - K-Pak The Wapak Concert - Writer and Director

== External link ==
- Kim Idol at IMDb
