= PMPC Star Award for Best Celebrity Talk Show =

The PMPC Star Award for Best Celebrity Talk Show is given to the best television celebrity talk show of the year and also celebrity talk show hosts.

== Winners ==
=== Celebrity Talk Show ===
1988: Not So Late Night with Edu (ABS-CBN 2)

1989: Martin After Dark (GMA 7)

1990: Mel & Jay (ABS-CBN 2)

1991: Martin After Dark (GMA 7)

1992: Mel & Jay (ABS-CBN 2)

1993: Martin After Dark (GMA 7)

1994:

1995: Mel & Jay (ABS-CBN 2)

1996:

1997:

1998: Partners Mel and Jay (GMA 7)

1999:

2000: Partners Mel and Jay (GMA 7) and Today With Kris Aquino (ABS-CBN 2) [tied]

2001: Partners Mel and Jay (GMA 7)

2002: Private Conversations (ABS-CBN 2)

2003: Morning Girls with Kris and Korina (ABS-CBN 2)

2004: Morning Girls with Kris and Korina (ABS-CBN 2)

2005: Homeboy (ABS-CBN 2)

2006: Homeboy (ABS-CBN 2)

2007: Sis (GMA 7)

2008: Boy and Kris (ABS-CBN 2)

2009: Sis (GMA 7)

2010: Spoon (Net 25)

2011: MOMents (Net 25)

2013: Kris TV (ABS-CBN 2)

2014: Gandang Gabi Vice (ABS-CBN 2)

2015: Aquino & Abunda Tonight (ABS-CBN 2)

2016: Tonight with Boy Abunda (ABS-CBN 2)

2017: Gandang Gabi Vice (ABS-CBN 2)

2018: Tonight with Boy Abunda (ABS-CBN 2)

2019: Tonight with Boy Abunda (ABS-CBN 2)

2020: Tonight with Boy Abunda (ABS-CBN 2)

2021: Magandang Buhay (A2Z 11)

2023: Fast Talk with Boy Abunda (GMA 7)

2024: My Mother, My Story (GMA 7)

=== Celebrity Talk Show Hosts ===
1988: Edu Manzano (Not So Late Night with Edu / ABS-CBN 2)

1989: Martin Nievera (Martin After Dark / GMA 7)

1990: Jay Sonza and Mel Tiangco (Mel & Jay / ABS-CBN 2)

1991: Martin Nievera (Martin After Dark / GMA 7)

1992: Jay Sonza and Mel Tiangco (Mel & Jay / ABS-CBN 2)

1993: Martin Nievera (Martin After Dark / GMA 7)

1994:

1995: Kris Aquino (Actually Yun Na! / RPN 9)

1996:

1997:

1998: Jay Sonza and Mel Tiangco (Partners Mel & Jay / GMA 7)

1999:

2000: Kris Aquino (Today With Kris Aquino / ABS-CBN 2) & Jay Sonza and Mel Tiangco (Partners Mel & Jay / GMA 7) [tied]

2001: Jay Sonza and Mel Tiangco (Partners Mel & Jay / GMA 7)

2002: Boy Abunda (Private Conversations / ABS-CBN 2)

2003: Kris Aquino and Korina Sanchez (Morning Girls with Kris and Korina / ABS-CBN 2)

2004: Kris Aquino and Korina Sanchez (Morning Girls with Kris and Korina / ABS-CBN 2)

2005: Boy Abunda (Homeboy / ABS-CBN 2)

2006: Boy Abunda (Homeboy / ABS-CBN 2)

2007: Boy Abunda (Homeboy / ABS-CBN 2)

2008: Boy Abunda and Kris Aquino (Boy and Kris / ABS-CBN 2)

2009: Janice de Belen (Spoon / Net 25)

2010: Janice de Belen (Spoon / Net 25)

2011: Janice de Belen (Spoon / Net 25)

2012: Kris Aquino (Kris TV / ABS-CBN 2) as "Best Female Showbiz Oriented/Celebrity Talk Show Host" & Vice Ganda (Gandang Gabi Vice / ABS-CBN 2) "Best Male Showbiz Oriented/Celebrity Talk Show Host"

2013: Vice Ganda (Gandang Gabi Vice / ABS-CBN 2)

2014: Vice Ganda (Gandang Gabi Vice / ABS-CBN 2)

2015: Boy Abunda and Kris Aquino (Aquino & Abunda Tonight / ABS-CBN 2)

2016: Boy Abunda (Tonight with Boy Abunda / ABS-CBN 2)

2017: Boy Abunda (Tonight with Boy Abunda / ABS-CBN 2)

2018: Boy Abunda (Tonight with Boy Abunda / ABS-CBN 2)

2019: Boy Abunda (Tonight with Boy Abunda / ABS-CBN 2)

2020: Boy Abunda (Tonight with Boy Abunda / ABS-CBN 2)

2021: Melai Cantiveros, Karla Estrada and Jolina Magdangal on (Magandang Buhay / A2Z 11)

2023: Boy Abunda (Fast Talk with Boy Abunda / GMA 7)

2024: Boy Abunda (My Mother, My Story / GMA 7)
