= Lakas Tama =

Vice Ganda Lakas Tama

Studio album by Vice Ganda
- Released: June 15, 2011
- Recorded: 2010–2011
- Genre: OPM; pop; rock
- Label: Vicor

Lakas Tama is the debut studio album by comedian Vice Ganda, released by Vicor Music June 15, 2011. It has 8 tracks, 5 original songs, and 3 revivals.

== Track listing ==
No.	Title	Length
1.	"Party Party"	5:47
2.	"Hiding Inside Myself"	5:29
3.	"Ituloy Mo Lang"	5:04
4.	"Lakas Tama"	4:18
5.	"Ayoko Na Sa 'Yo"	3:31
6.	"May Puso Rin Kami"	5:10
7.	"Palong Palo"	6:54
8.	"Good Vibes"	3:26
Total length:		33:52
