= Vice Ganda =

Filipino comedian, actor, and television personality (born 1976)

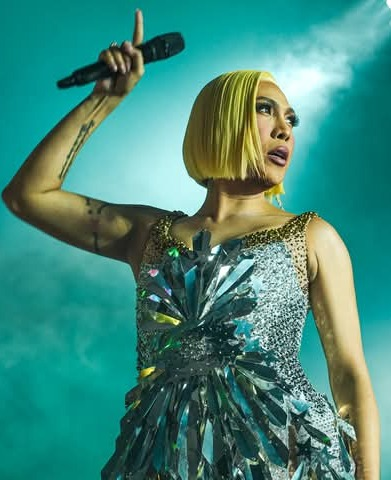
- Vice Ganda at the 2025 KanLahi Festival in Tarlac
- Born: Jose Marie Borja Viceral; March 31, 1976 (age 50); Tondo, Manila, Philippines
- Education: Far Eastern University
- Agent: ABS-CBN (2009–present)
- Partner: Ion Perez (2018–present)

Comedy career
- Years active: 1997–present
- Medium: Stand-up; film; television
- Genres: Observational comedy; character comedy; satire
- Subjects: Everyday life; popular culture; politics; celebrities; human sexuality
- Musical career
- Genres: Pop; OPM; dance; novelty
- Instrument: Vocals
- Years active: 2009–present
- Labels: Viva Records (2010–2011); Star Music (2010–present)

Jose Marie Borja Viceral (Tagalog: [maˈɾi ˈboɾhɐ bisɛˈɾal]; born March 31, 1976), known professionally as Vice Ganda (Tagalog: [ɡɐnˈda]; lit. 'beautiful Vice'), is a Filipino comedian, television host, actor, singer, and businessman. He (Note: Vice Ganda is indifferent to being referred to with male or female pronouns. This article uses he/him for consistency.) is considered one of the most successful entertainers in Philippine show business, noted for his stand-up routines, usage of observational comedy, situational irony and sarcasm in pertaining to Filipino culture and human sexuality. He is a regular host on ABS-CBN's noontime variety show It's Showtime and has starred in three of the top 10 highest-grossing films in Philippine cinema.

Vice Ganda began his career as a singer and stand-up comedian at Punchline and The Library in Manila. He also played minor roles and guest roles in various television programs and films. Vice Ganda became more recognized in the talent search program It's Showtime (2009), gaining widespread popularity and acquiring his first lead role in the 2010 remake film Petrang Kabayo. In the years that followed, Vice Ganda broke several box-office records in his succeeding releases, including The Unkabogable Praybeyt Benjamin (2011), Sisterakas (2012), Girl, Boy, Bakla, Tomboy (2013), The Amazing Praybeyt Benjamin (2014), Beauty and the Bestie (2015), The Super Parental Guardians (2016), Gandarrapido: The Revenger Squad (2017), Fantastica (2018), The Mall, the Merrier! (2019), Partners in Crime (2022) and And the Breadwinner Is... (2024).

Dubbed as the "Unkabogable Queen" (Note: "Unbeatable", a partial calque from Tagalog slang kabog) and "Phenomenal Superstar" by the media, Vice Ganda is the highest-grossing Filipino movie actor of all time, with a total movie gross of ₱4.6 billion since 2022. He has received numerous awards including two Asian Academy Creative Awards, a FAMAS Award, a Guinness World Record and a star on the Eastwood City Walk of Fame. With nearly 50 million combined followers, he is one of the most followed Filipino personalities across all leading social media platforms. Forbes Asia lists him among the most influential celebrities in the Asia-Pacific, while Reader's Digest named him as one of the most trusted personalities in 2023. He was the first LGBTQ endorser for Globe Telecom.

== Early life ==
Vice Ganda was born as Jose Marie Borja Viceral on March 31, 1976, in Tondo, Manila, Philippines. Before coming out to his family and loved ones, Vice Ganda was known as "Tutoy" since boyhood. The youngest of six children, Vice Ganda grew up along Tambunting Street in Santa Cruz, Manila. His father Reynaldo Viceral was a native of Taysan, Batangas, while his mother Rosario Borja was an Ilocana from San Juan, La Union. Reynaldo, who served as a barangay captain in Tondo, Manila, was gunned down in front of the family on Palm Sunday 1991 when Vice was a teenager. The incident, which Vice described as traumatic, prompted Rosario to leave for work abroad as a caregiver.

=== Education ===
Vice’s education was enabled by a scholarship grant from a donor whom he identified as a certain Noriko Tokura of Kyoto. He said he wrote weekly to Tokura, and her generosity supported his studies from third grade until second year college.

Vice had his primary education at F.D. Calderon Integrated School and Barrio Obrero Elementary School, then completed his secondary education at Far Eastern University High School in 1992.

Vice studied political science at Far Eastern University but did not finish due to pursuing his career.

== Career ==
=== 1997–2008: Stand-up comedy and cross-over to television and films ===
Vice Ganda started out as a singer, then as a comedian for Punchline and The Library in Manila, whose owner Andrew de Real gave him the stage name "Vice Ganda". He was discovered by Hans Mortel who later introduced him to De Real, the "Godfather of Malate" and "King of Comedy Bars" who had served as his mentor for his comedy skits. There he spent several years developing his material in the comedy clubs. His career began to build after appearances on television and reviews from tabloid columns.

He works alongside fellow comedians Chokoleit, Pooh, John Lapus and Rey Kilay. Vice is widely known for his observational comedy and situational irony type of comedy skits. In 1999, a talent scout and now a fellow television comedian and manager, Ogie Diaz, discovered Vice in one of his visits to the comedy bars.

He appeared first as Antonia in the Judy Ann Drama Special aired by commercial television network ABS-CBN. He also made a cameo appearance in Sa Paraiso ni Efren, a film produced by Regal Films. In the same year, Vice appeared as one of the guests for Comedy Central Market under GMA Network and became a guest performer for a now defunct show, SOP, in the same network. In 2002, he was one of the contenders in "O Diva" and "Birit Queen", both singing contests in Eat Bulaga!, the longest-running noontime show in the Philippines. Since then, he played minor roles or guest roles in various television programs of ABS-CBN such as M.R.S. (Most Requested Show) and various roles in a drama anthology, Maalaala Mo Kaya.

In 2007, Vice Ganda appeared on his biggest project at that time in Apat Dapat, Dapat Apat, a film under VIVA Films starring Candy Pangilinan, Eugene Domingo, Rufa Mae Quinto and Pokwang. During this time, he continued to perform as a stand-up comedian to make ends meet. In the same year, he starred as one of the supporting actors for a television series Kokey. In 2008, Ganda appeared in a minor role in an independent film Condo with Coco Martin, and in the same year in a Star Cinema film In My Life alongside Vilma Santos and John Lloyd Cruz. He then appeared in several television series and sitcoms such as Dyosa, under the direction of Wenn V. Deramas, and in the drama series Maging Sino Ka Man: Ang Pagbabalik.

=== 2009–2015: It's Showtime and rise to prominence ===
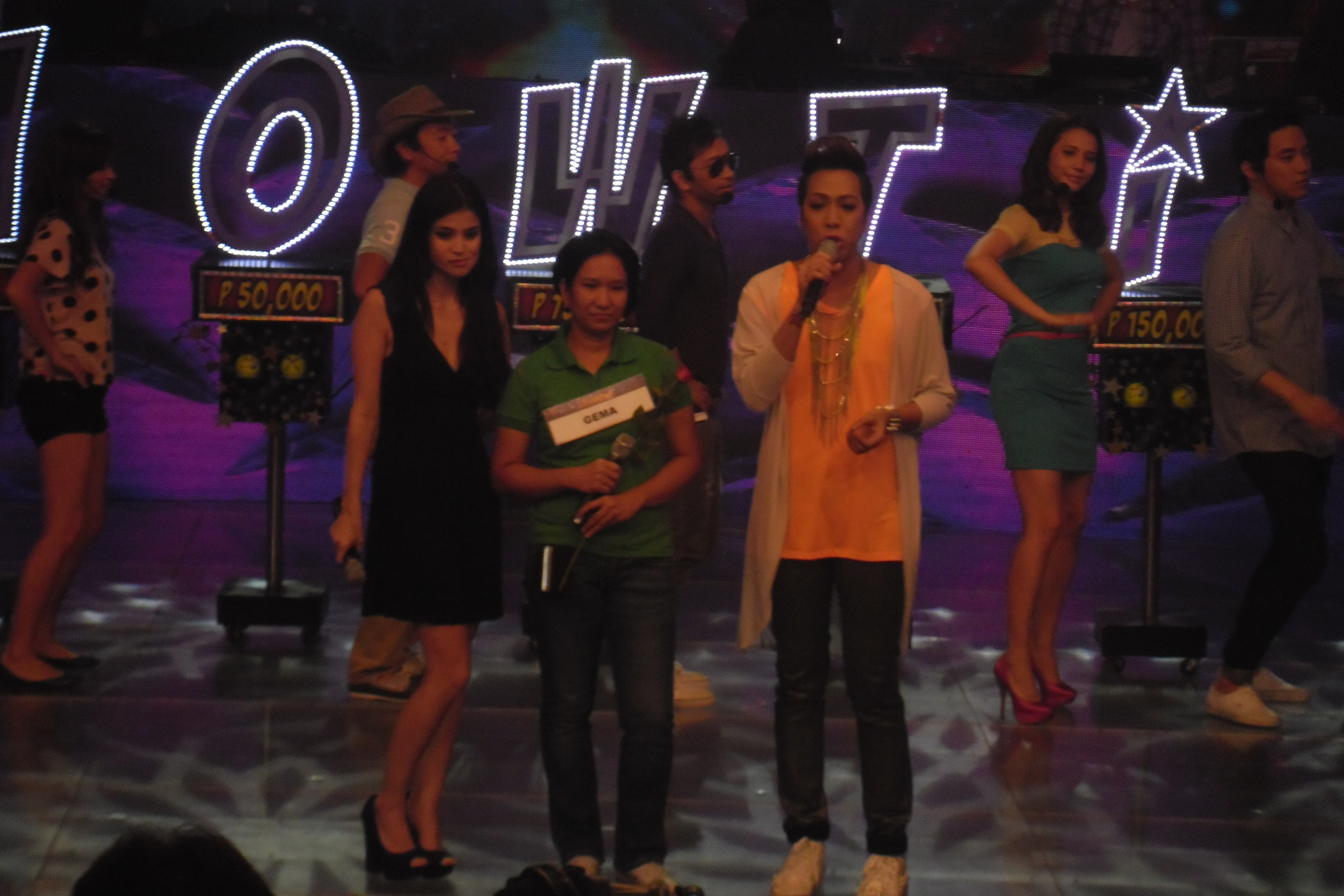
Vice Ganda (right) hosting in the "Showtime Goodtime" segment of It's Showtime.

Vice Ganda's biggest break was acquiring a role in It's Showtime, a talent search program of ABS-CBN premiered in October 2009. The role was refused by then comedian Long Mejia until he was offered to replace Mejia as an unelectable judge. With this career break through, Vice's life story of being bullied as a young, closeted homosexual has also been featured in the drama anthology, Maalaala Mo Kaya.

In 2010, he gained widespread popularity due to his jokes and sarcasm. He was one of the supporting roles for Hating Kapatid alongside Judy Ann Santos and Sarah Geronimo. In the same year, he starred in his first ever feature film, a remake of the 1988 comedy film, Petrang Kabayo, originally played by Roderick Paulate. The film was an instant hit at its release and became one of the best-selling Filipino films of 2010. In the same year, Ganda staged his first ever major concert titled as "May Nag-Text.. 'Yung Totoo! Vice Ganda sa Araneta" held at the Araneta Coliseum.

In 2011, he became host of his own Sunday talk show, Gandang Gabi, Vice!, which ended in 2020. In the same year, he won the Bert Marcelo Achievement Award for Excellence in Comedy at the 2011 GMMSF Box-Office Entertainment Awards. He also appeared on various guest roles for television series, Your Song, 100 Days to Heaven and I Dare You. Vice then launched his successful 2nd major concert at the Araneta Coliseum, a sold-out event called "Eto Na: Vice Ganda, Todong Sample sa Araneta".

In 2012, he top-billed the film The Unkabogable Praybeyt Benjamin, with Derek Ramsay, directed by Wenn V. Deramas. The movie became the first local film to reach ₱300 million in ticket sales, and proved to be an even greater box office success than Petrang Kabayo. Ganda also starred in the Filipino comedy film This Guy's in Love with U Mare! under Star Cinema and Viva Films, alongside Luis Manzano and Toni Gonzaga, directed by Deramas. Ganda appeared on his first ever Metro Manila Film Festival entry, Sisterakas, a Filipino comedy parody film produced by Star Cinema and Viva Films in 2012 along with Kris Aquino and Ai-Ai de las Alas. The film became the highest-grossing Filipino film of 2012 and now the 3rd highest-grossing Filipino film of all time.

In 2013, he starred in another hit movie alongside Maricel Soriano called Girl, Boy, Bakla, Tomboy, an official entry of the 2013 Metro Manila Film Festival. The movie earned Ganda a Best Actor nomination at the MMFF and earned him Movie Actor Of The Year award at the 2014 Philippine Movie Press Club Star Awards for Movies (PMPC). In the same year, Ganda had his 3rd major concert called "I-Vice Ganda Mo Ko sa Araneta", a live concert that sparked controversy with GMA News head journalist Jessica Soho.

In 2014, Star Cinema released a movie called The Amazing Praybeyt Benjamin an official entry for the 2014 Metro Manila Film Festival and a sequel of a 2011 film of the same title. Vice participated alongside actress Alex Gonzaga, and actors Richard Yap and James "Bimby" Aquino-Yap. The film was directed by Wenn V. Deramas and became the highest grossing Filipino film of 2014.

In 2015, Star Cinema released Beauty and the Bestie, an official entry for the 2015 Metro Manila Film Festival, directed by Wenn V. Deramas. Vice starred alongside actors Coco Martin, James Reid and Nadine Lustre. The film ended up as the highest-grossing Filipino film of 2015.

=== 2016–2022: Further commercial success ===
In 2016, Vice Ganda starred in an action comedy film The Super Parental Guardians with Coco Martin. The film is directed by Joyce Bernal and is under the production of Star Cinema. This marks Ganda's 3rd consecutive highest-grossing film as it topped the 2016 year-end box office gross in Philippine cinema. The film also made history as it holds the record for highest opening day gross of all Filipino films, at ₱75 million. In the same year, he became judge in the 5th and 6th seasons of Pilipinas Got Talent, along with his fellow celebrities, Angel Locsin and Robin Padilla and in Pinoy Boyband Superstar with Aga Muhlach, Yeng Constantino and 2NE1 member Sandara Park.

In 2017, he starred in another Metro Manila Film Festival entry titled Gandarrapiddo: The Revenger Squad alongside Daniel Padilla and Miss Universe 2015 Pia Wurtzbach. The film marks Ganda's 4th consecutive highest-grossing film of the year. Aside from his film, he also staged two major concerts in the same year, the first is the sold-out concert "Pusuan Mo si Vice Ganda sa Araneta" which further added few shows in the United States particularly in Houston, Texas, Kissimmee, Florida, San Diego and Los Angeles in California, and the second being the grand launch concert of his own make-up brand, Vice Cosmetics titled as "Vice Ganda For All".

In 2018, he starred in Fantastica, a 2018 Filipino fantasy comedy film directed by Barry Gonzalez and an official entry to the yearly Metro Manila Film Festival. It stars an ensemble cast including Bela Padilla, Richard Gutierrez and Dingdong Dantes. The film became the 2nd highest-grossing Filipino film of 2018 and 5th on the highest-grossing Filipino film of all time.

In 2019, Vice Ganda together with Anne Curtis top-billed the 2019 Metro Manila Film Festival entry, The Mall, The Merrier. This was the first time that he did not top the box-office of the said film festival and ended up on a 2nd place behind Miracle in Cell No. 7. Vice also staged his first ever duo concert with Asia's Songbird Regine Velasquez titled as "The Songbird and the Song Horse" at the Araneta Coliseum. The concert was a major success and had a run for three consecutive shows on February 14–16, 2019.

In June 2021, he hosted a game show, Everybody, Sing!, which replaced his own talk show Gandang Gabi, Vice!, the game show concluded in October 2021, then returned to television for its 2nd season in September 2022. The show made Vice Ganda the first Filipino to win "Best Lifestyle", "Entertainment Presenter/Host" in the fourth Asian Academy Creative Awards (AACA). Due to the restrictions brought upon by the COVID pandemic, he launched his first ever digital pay-per-view concert "Gandemic: The VG-tal Concert" in Sky Cable. After few months, with the easing of restrictions, Vice returned to live stage with his concert "Vax Ganda: A Dose Of Laughter" at Pechanga Resort & Casino in Temecula, California and in Mohegan Sun in Connecticut.

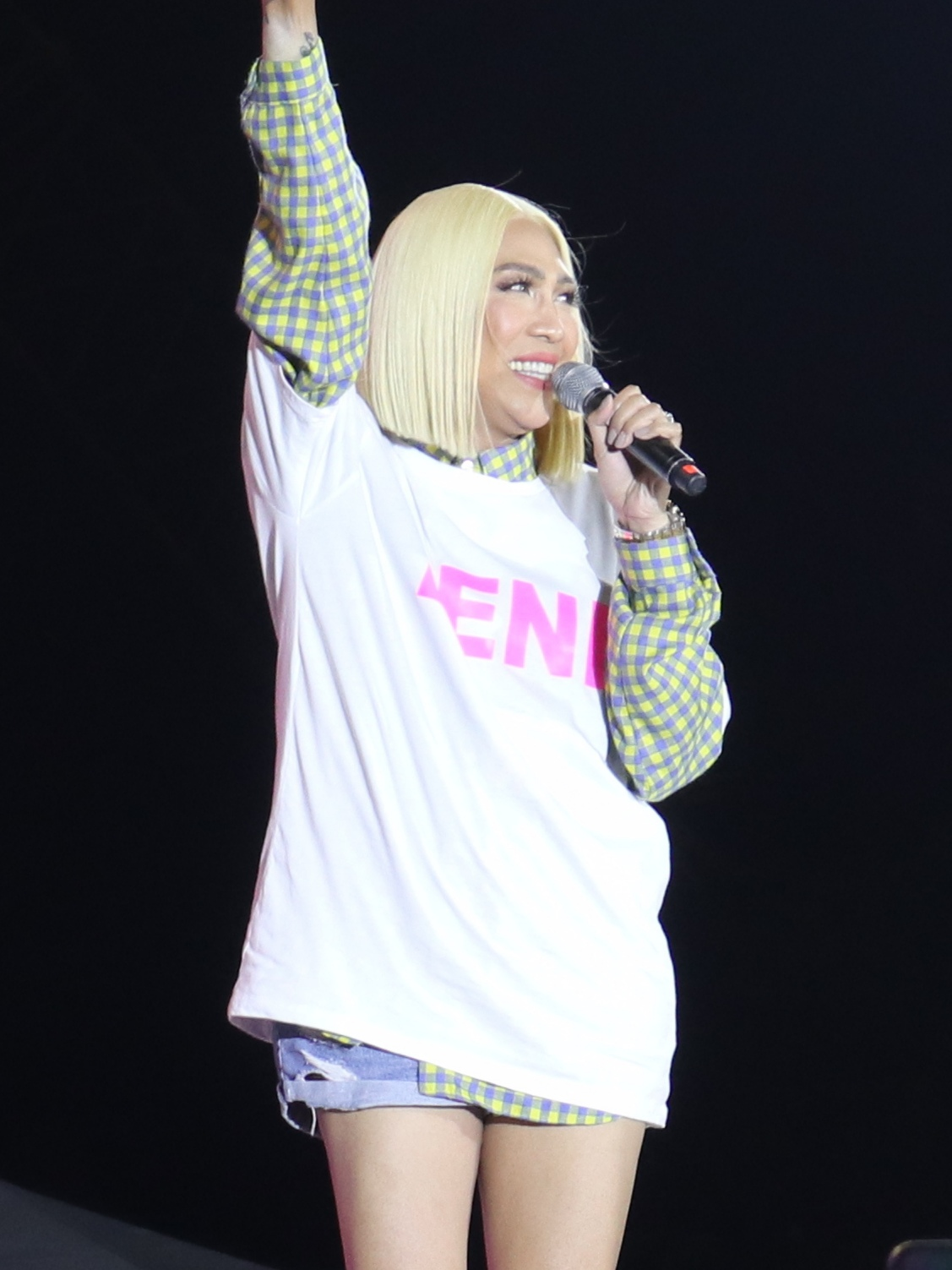
Vice Ganda in 2022

In 2022, Vice Ganda returned to movies through 2022 Metro Manila Film Festival entry Partners in Crime under Star Cinema alongside vlogger Ivana Alawi which ended up as the second-highest grossing entry of the said film festival. The film was later on screened in Saitama and Nagoya, Japan in February 2023. Vice pushed his success further as he won numerous awards such as "Most Outstanding Twitter Influencer", "Most Outstanding Social Media Personality", "Most Influential Multimedia Filipino Celebrity", and "Most Outstanding Entertainment Show Host" at the 5th Gawad Lasallianeta held at the De La Salle Araneta University. Ganda also won "Best Variety Show Host" at the 2023 Platinum Stallion National Media Awards of Trinity University of Asia.

=== 2023-present: Contract renewal with ABS-CBN and films with Jun Robles Lana ===
In 2023, Vice Ganda renewed his contract with ABS-CBN and embarked on a concert tour in Canada and the United States.

In 2024, Vice Ganda returned to the Metro Manila Film Festival with And the Breadwinner Is... under Star Cinema and The IdeaFirst Company. His first collaboration with director Jun Robles Lana, Vice Ganda won the 2025 FAMAS Award for Best Actor for his role as an OFW returning to the Philippines.

In 2025, Vice Ganda and Lana collaborated for the second time in the drama comedy film Call Me Mother. An entry to the 51st Metro Manila Film Festival, the film earned Vice Ganda the festival’s Best Actor award. Call Me Mother also opened the inaugural Philippines-Japan Film Festival in 2026, with Vice Ganda and Lana attending the premiere; And the Breadwinner Is... was also included in the festival’s lineup.

In 2026, Vice Ganda signed a major creative partnership with MediaQuest Holdings, following his contract renewal with ABS-CBN.

Vice Ganda is set to star in his third collaboration with Lana through The Greatest Showdown, an entry to the 52nd Metro Manila Film Festival.

== Other ventures ==
=== Music ===
In 2011, Vice Ganda released his first studio album, Lakas Tama under Vicor Music. It features mostly pop and novelty songs, including his lead single "Palong Palo", written by Callalily frontman Kean Cipriano. In the same year, he was also included in the compilation album of Showtime, released by Star Records.

In 2013, he released his self-titled album under Star Music. Ganda's carrier single "Karakaraka" featuring Filipino rapper Smugglaz quickly reached the top spot of the most-downloaded songs in the online musical portal MyMusicStore on the first day of its release. The hit single was used as theme song of the 2013 romantic-comedy Star Cinema film Bromance: My Brother's Romance. In 2014, Vice Ganda released his 3rd album, entitled #Trending, which featured the song "Boom Panes" and "Push Mo Yan Teh!". The album reached gold record status with more than 7,500 copies sold in its first week according to the Philippine Association of the Record Industry, Inc. (PARI). The album featured songs that speak about social issues including gender inequality and corruption.

In 2015, Vice Ganda released his single "Wag Kang Pabebe" with a music video released in July of the same year. He also released "Eh di Wow" as official soundtrack for Inday Bote and a cover of Jolina Magdangal's "Chuva Choo Choo" as a soundtrack for his film, Beauty and the Bestie. In 2016, Vice released the sound track for his film The Super Parental Guardians, titled as "Ang Kulit", an original composition under Star Records. The song was composed by Jonathan Manalo in which Ganda expressed his gratitude to him for making the single along with his previous hits like "Wag kang Pabebe" and "Boom Panes" during Manalo's show at the Music Museum. In 2017, Ganda released his ballad single "Hanggang Kailan Aasa" and his pop single "Gigil si Aquo". The following year, he released "Ganda for All", a non-album single and "Kay Sayang Pasko Na Naman" in 2019.

=== Book ===
On July 16, 2016, Vice Ganda launched his first book titled President Vice: Ang Bagong Panggulo ng Pilipinas (lit. '"President Vice: The New Troublemaker President of the Philippines"'), a parody about how he would deal with problems of the Filipinos in case he was elected the next president of the Philippines. As of 2017, the book has already sold more than 100,000 copies in the Philippines.

=== Cosmetics ===
On October 7, 2017, Vice Ganda launched "Vice Cosmetics", his own brand of cosmetics. In an interview by Rappler during his successful Meet-and-Greet at TriNoma store, he said that the idea to start his own makeup company started when he was offered to endorse a cosmetics line. His products from Vice Cosmetics are all designed in Los Angeles. In line with the launch, a concert named "Ganda For All" was held at the Smart Araneta Coliseum with various performers including its first ever celebrity endorsers, Maymay Entrata and Kisses Delavin. During the event, Vice Cosmetics earns Guinness World Record after 6,900 people applied lipstick at the same time surpassing the record of MaryKay Cosmetics in China with previous record of 5,840.

=== Sports ===
Vice Ganda was the owner of the Premier Volleyball League men's team Vice Co. Blockbusters which played at the 2018 PVL Reinforced Conference The squad coached by Rey Diaz consisted mostly of players from the FEU Tamaraws which finished third place in UAAP Season 80. Vice Co. reached the semifinals where their campaign was ended by the Philippine Air Force Air Spikers.

Vice Ganda himself is part of the roster and was listed as an outside hitter for the Blockbusters.

== Personal life ==
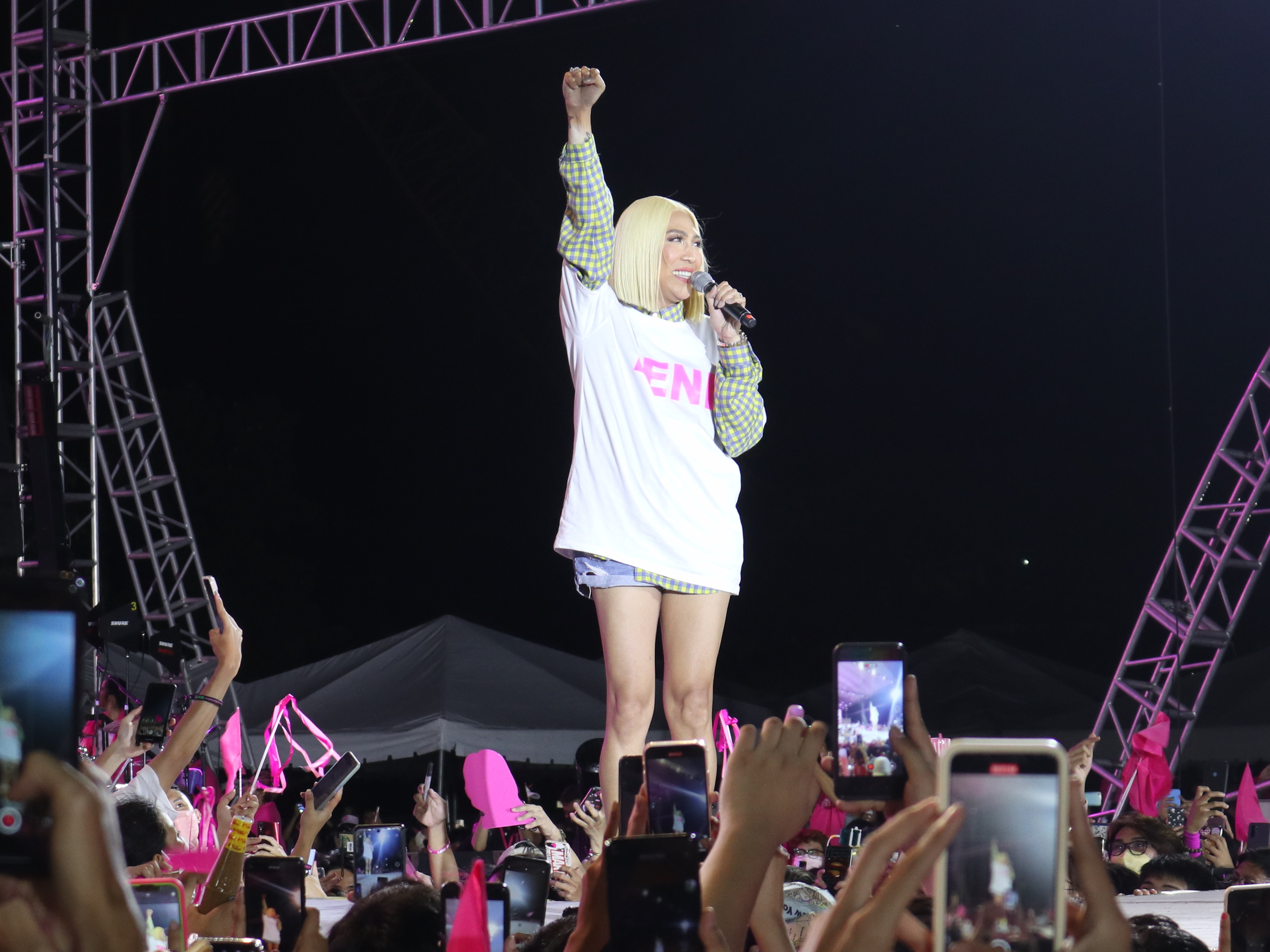
Vice Ganda appearing in a rally in support of Leni Robredo's presidential campaign

Vice Ganda is non-binary and does not mind being addressed with either masculine or feminine pronouns. He has advocated for queer rights and representation throughout his career.

Vice Ganda reportedly suffered from depression due to career issues and personal problems. One of his biggest life inspirations is his teacher who told him to "always follow his dreams no matter how big or wild they are." Since November 2018, he has been in a relationship with Ion Perez, a member of the supporting cast on It's Showtime. On his YouTube vlog uploaded on February 13, 2022, he revealed that he and Perez underwent a commitment ceremony on October 19, 2021, at The Little Vegas Chapel in Las Vegas, Nevada.

=== Politics ===
Vice Ganda endorsed Davao City mayor Rodrigo Duterte for president, during the 2016 Philippine presidential election, and had him on as a guest for Gandang Gabi, Vice!, his late-night television show. For the 2022 Philippine presidential election, he endorsed Vice President Leni Robredo for president. At Robredo's miting de avance (final rally before election day), he also endorsed her running mate Senator Kiko Pangilinan for vice president.

== Philanthropy ==
In 2013, Vice Ganda auctioned off some of his clothing and performed for a fundraising comedy show and donated all proceeds to ABS-CBN's Sagip Kapamilya (Save a Family) relief operations for those affected by Super Typhoon Yolanda, one of the deadliest and most powerful tropical cyclones ever recorded. He also joined a charity basketball game organized by fellow celebrities and PBA players held at Ynares Sports Arena in Pasig City to raise funds for families affected particularly in the Visayas region.

In 2020, during the peak of COVID-19 pandemic in the Philippines, Vice Ganda donated face masks, disposable gloves, safety goggles, alcohol, and disinfectant spray for use by health workers in various hospitals in the Philippines. Apart from his extensive donation campaign for medical frontliners, Vice Ganda also provided financial assistance to more than 400 employees of his cosmetics company. Vice Ganda also launched his post-birthday donation drive for two barangays in Quezon City wherein he handed relief packs containing canned goods, rice, noodles, soaps, among others to 850 families in Brgy. South Triangle and Brgy. Paligsahan.

Vice was among the performers that appeared in "Pantawid ng Pag-ibig: At Home Together Concert". He launched his single "Corona Bye-Bye Na" during the live telecast. The show aimed to as a fundraiser for basic necessities for those affected by the pandemic. Vice Ganda also partnered with Angel Locsin to provide beds in a temporary air-conditioned sleeping tents for medical staffs and other essential workers of Taguig City.

In November 2020, Vice Ganda together with boyfriend Ion Perez, sibling Babot Viceral, actor-dancer Jhong Hilario and fiancé Maia Azores, began a donation drive which allocated more than ₱1 million to help purchase donations for people affected by Typhoon Vamco, known locally as Ulysses.

In the August 2021 episode of his show, Everybody Sing! wherein the contestants are mountaineers and hikers, Vice added donation to the Bourne to Hike Mountaineers' beneficiaries- the Aeta communities in Bicol region. In November 2021, he donated his a day-worth of talent fee to ABS-CBN Foundation for the benefits of the victims of Typhoon Odette in Cebu and Siargao. Ganda announced this during It's Showtime live telecast influencing his fellow hosts to donate their talent fees as well.

In November 2021, during the annual "Magpasikat" competition of It's Showtime hosts against each other. Vice and his group together with Ryan Bang and Jackie Gonzaga won runner up and dedicated their winning prize of ₱100,000 to The Ruth Foundation for Palliative and Hospice Care (Ruth Foundation Project Reef Care). The said foundation caters to COVID and Non COVID cases and help them with medical care.

In January 2022, he donated ₱500,000 to a 10-day benefit concert headed by Regine Velasquez in the "Tulung-Tulong sa Pag-ahon campaign" of ABS-CBN Foundation to aid further recovery of typhoon Odette-affected families. In March 2022, in a vlog uploaded in his YouTube account, Vice extended help to random strangers by paying for the medicines they bought in a pharmacy opposite AFP Medical Center in Quezon City. According to him, finding the money to buy medicine is a big headache for a lot of people so he paid for the expenses of all customers throughout the day.

In April 2024, Vice Ganda and fellow It's Showtime hosts donated their winnings from Family Feud to PISTON, a federation of public transport drivers' and operators' associations. This donation came at a time when the drivers were protesting the government's planned jeepney phaseout.

== Public reception ==
=== Cultural impact ===
==== Filipino humor ====
Vice Ganda's use of sarcasm in his style of comedy is cited by various researchers as a major contributing factor to the modern Filipino humor. According to a study conducted by a group of researchers from the University of San Jose–Recoletos, half of the participants showed confidence from mimicking Vice Ganda's style of humor, with a majority of them stating they mimick his style of humor during conversations. In a separate study by the Centro Escolar University and Western Mindanao State University about the pragmatics of Filipino humor, Vice Ganda's popularity in various entertainment mediums like television and the internet, as well as his use of irony and conversational witticisms greatly influenced the popular comedic strategies used by Filipinos in their day-to-day conversations, sometimes even to the point of being disrespectful towards the elderly among Vice Ganda's younger audience.

==== LGBT rights ====
The popularity of Vice Ganda, an openly gay individual, in the Philippines, a predominantly Roman Catholic nation, is seen by observers as vital in kickstarting discussions of LGBT people to the mainstream media. He himself is an advocate to the local LGBT movement in the country, and is one of the prominent personalities that seeks equal opportunities to the LGBT members in the Philippines. He supports the SOGIE Equality Bill, a series of bills that was introduced to the Philippine Congress starting from the 2010s that aims to enact protections against discrimination towards LGBT people. In a live episode of It's Showtime in 2018, where he is one of the hosts, Vice Ganda expressed his opinions about the bill, saying that he faces discrimination in using comfort rooms of either gender, that the bill should be passed as soon as possible.

In 2018 and again in 2020, he became the cover image for the magazine Mega, becoming the first LGBT member to do so in the history of the magazine.

=== Controversies ===
- Gang rape jokes against Jessica Soho. In May 2013, Vice Ganda was widely criticized for making several jokes about gang rape during his I-Vice Ganda Mo Ko! comedy concert show. One of them was directed towards the news anchor and journalist Jessica Soho, whom he mentioned in a joke regarding several personalities starring in a hypothetical pornographic film. Women's rights group GABRIELA condemned the joke as being distasteful in light of rape victims. Journalist Arnold Clavio, a colleague of Soho, defended the news anchor and expressed his disapproval of Vice Ganda's body-shaming remark in one of the former's radio programs. Although Vice Ganda initially defended his stance, saying that the brand of humor he uses is based on his roots doing stand-up in comedy bars and karaoke lounges, he nevertheless issued an apology over the issue during an episode of the noontime show It's Showtime.
- Nora Aunor. Actress Nora Aunor became a target of Vice Ganda's style of humor during an episode of It's Showtime. Aunor pulled out as judge for the grand finals of the show's segment Tawag ng Tanghalan at the last minute. Aunor believed Vice Ganda's brand of insult comedy was against her moral beliefs, and was perturbed with the idea of being on the show alongside Vice Ganda.
- Apollo Quiboloy. On one of his daily comedic discussions following a performance by Gian Magdangal on Tawag ng Tanghalan: Celebrity Champions, Vice Ganda made a joke after the founder of Kingdom of Jesus Christ, Apollo Quiboloy, among other claims of being responsible for stopping calamities, claimed that he was responsible for stopping the 2019 Cotabato earthquakes. Vice Ganda jokingly challenged Quiboloy to stop the airing of It's Showtime, which is one of the longest-running ABS-CBN television programs alongside Ang Probinsyano, and the constant traffic on EDSA, a major road network in Metro Manila. Members of Quiboloy's church took offense and expressed their dismay for Vice Ganda. Radio broadcaster and SMNI anchor, Mike Abe, a friend of Quiboloy, defended the founder and criticized Vice heavily in his program. Two days after the joke, Quiboloy instead threatened that he will not only stop Ang Probinsyano, but also to shutdown ABS-CBN as a whole within four months. The network went off-air in 2020 in a controversial refusal to renew the network's franchise by the legislature, an act that was seen by Quiboloy and his followers as the fulfillment of his previous remarks against the comedian.
- Cake-icing Finger. During the "Isip-bata" segment on It's Showtime, Ion Perez and Vice Ganda faced criticism from social media influencer Rendon Labador for actions perceived as inappropriate. Labador challenged the MTRCB for the alleged misconduct of Ion and Vice, leading to the subsequent suspension of the show for two weeks by MTRCB chairperson Lala Sotto.
- Accusation of malice. On May 31, 2024, during the "EXpecially For You" segment of It's Showtime, participants Axel and Christine greeted each other as the former approached the latter. However, Vice Ganda perceived the greeting as an unwanted kiss (nagnanakaw ng halik), calling out Axel immediately after the greeting. After participating in the segment, Axel and Christine each released their statement on the matter, with both saying that the greeting was similar to a pound hug. Vice Ganda, in a now-deleted post on X (formerly Twitter), intended to apologize to Axel after the statements were released. However, on June 4, 2024, he retracted his apology, stating, "Bilang main host po nung segment na yon, it was my duty to call that action out. Dahil kung hindi ko rin ginawa yon, ako rin ang maku-call out, bakit namin hinahayaan. (As the main host of that segment, it was my duty to call that action out. Because if I didn't, I would get called out and asked why we let it happen.)"
- Jetski Holiday. In August 2025, during the first night of the Superdivas concert with Regine Velasquez at the Smart Araneta Coliseum, Vice Ganda parodied the viral Jet2holidays meme with "nothing beats a jet ski holiday", referencing former president Rodrigo Duterte's 2016 campaign pledge to ride a jet ski to the Spratly Islands to assert Philippine sovereignty in the South China Sea. The portrayal was also followed by references to the China Coast Guard's use of water cannons and Duterte's incarceration at the International Criminal Court in The Hague. Vice Ganda also used language associated with Duterte's own public remarks and singled out Duterte's supporters in his skit. Clips of the performance circulated widely on social media, drawing praise from Duterte critics and condemnation from his supporters. As a result, some Duterte supporters have also called for a boycott of brands endorsed by Vice Ganda, such as McDonald's.
- Racism allegations. During the "Memerimar" skit in the segment Laro Laro Pick on It's Showtime on July 24, 2026, Vice Ganda spat water on the face of Baby Dolls member Johaira and said "Anong nangyari sa ’yo? Bakit nagputik ka?" or "What happened to you? Why are you covered in mud?". Since Johaira has dark complexion and Vice Ganda compared it to mud, it gained backlash among social media users, with many arguing that it shows racism. He later apologized the following day, saying that the hosts would be more mindful of their jokes next time.

== Discography ==
=== Studio albums ===
Year	Title	Label	Certifications
2011	Lakas Tama	Vicor Music	PARI: Gold
2013	Vice Ganda	Star Music	PARI: Platinum
2014	#Trending	Star Music	PARI: Gold

=== Compilation albums ===
Year	Title	Label
2010	Showtime: The Album	Star Music

=== Extended plays ===
Year	Title	Label
2013	Karakaraka (Dance EP)	Star Music

=== Singles ===
Year	Title	Album
2012	"This Guys In Love with You Mare" (with Toni Gonzaga and Luis Manzano)	This Guy's in Love with U Mare! Official Soundtrack
2013	"KaraKaraka" (featuring Smugglaz)	Vice Ganda and Karakaraka (Dance EP)
2013	"Manhid Ka"	Vice Ganda
2013	"Whoops Kirri"	Girl, Boy, Bakla, Tomboy; Official Soundtrack
2014	"Boompanes"	#Trending
2014	"Push Mo Yan Te" (featuring Regine Velasquez)	#Trending
2015	"Eh Di Wow!"	Inday Bote; Official Soundtrack
2015	"Wag Kang Pabebe"	Non-album single
2015	"Chuva Choo Choo"	Beauty and the Bestie; Official Soundtrack
2016	"Pasa Diyos" (Young JV featuring Vice Ganda)	Non-album single
2016	"Ang Kulit"	The Super Parental Guardians; Official Soundtrack
2017	"Hanggang Kailan Aasa"	Non-album single
2017	"Gigil si Aquo"	Gandarrapido: The Revenger Squad; Official Soundtrack
2018	"Ganda for All"	Non-album single
2018	"Fantastic Ka"	Fantastica; Official Soundtrack
2018	"Dahil Kasama"	Fantastica; Official Soundtrack
2019	"Kay Sayang Pasko Na Naman" (with Anne Curtis and Kritiko)	The Mall, The Merrier; Official Soundtrack
2020	"Corona Ba-Bye Na!"	Non-album singles
2020	"Mahal Ako Ng Mahal Ko"	Non-album singles
2021	"Higad Girl"	Kaka; Official Soundtrack
2021	"Toxic Free" (with DJ M.O.D featuring Karylle)	Non-album singles
2022	"Look at Me Now"	Non-album singles
2022	"Kapit Lang" (with Jugs Jugueta and Teddy Corpuz)	Partners in Crime; Official Soundtrack
2023	"Rampa"	Non-album singles
2024	"Bwak, Bwak, Bwak!"	Non-album singles
2024	"Paskong Pinakamasaya"	Non-album singles
2024	"Rainbow Christmas"	Non-album singles
2025	"Superdiva" (with Regine Velasquez)	Non-album singles
2026	"Talak"	Non-album singles

== Concerts ==
Headlining concerts
Year	Title	Details	Notes	Ref.
2010	May Nag-Text.. 'Yung Totoo! Vice Ganda sa Araneta	Date: May 15, 2010; Venue: Araneta Coliseum	Vice Ganda was reportedly paid ₱2 million for his first ever major solo concert.; Special Guest:Jaya, Ethel Booba, Kian Cipriano, Jhong Hilario & Pops Fernandez	
2011	Eto Na: Vice Ganda, Todong Sample sa Araneta	Date: July 1, 2011; Venue: Araneta Coliseum	Vice Ganda was reportedly paid ₱3 million for his second major concert, becoming the highest-paid Araneta Coliseum concert performer ever.; Special guest: Sarah Geronimo, Anne Curtis, Cristine Reyes & Xian Lim	
2013	I-Vice Ganda Mo Ako sa Araneta	Date: May 17, 2013; Venue: Araneta Coliseum	Highest-earning concert by a Filipino artist in 2013; Special Guest: Daniel Padilla, Regine Velasquez, Ai ai delas Alas, Enrique Gil and Dawn Zulueta.	
2015	Vice Gandang Ganda Sa Sarili sa Araneta.. Eh Di Wow!	Date: May 22, 2015; Venue: Araneta Coliseum	Vice Ganda holds the record for having the most attended concert by a Filipino artist at the Araneta Coliseum.; Special guest: James Reid, Vhong Navarro, Billy Crawford, Jovit Baldivino and Kakai Bautista	
2017	Pusuan Mo Si Vice Ganda sa Araneta	Date: February 14, 2017; Venue: Araneta Coliseum	The concert was reportedly attended by 12,000 fans.; Special guest: Daniel Padilla, Maja Salvador, Awra Briguela, Michael Pangilinan and Kris Lawrence	
2017	Vice Ganda For All Concert	Date: October 22, 2017; Venue: Araneta Coliseum	Vice Ganda broke the Guinness World Record for the most number of people applying lipstick (6,900 people) at the grand launch of his new cosmetics line, Vice Cosmetics.; Special guest: Maymay Entrata, Kisses Delavin, Edward Barber, Bituin Escalante, Frenchie Dy and Karylle	
2021	Vax Ganda: A Dose Of Laughter US Tour	Date: October 15, 2021	Vice Ganda's first concert with a live audience since the pandemic.; Special guest: Angeline Quinto	
2023	VGFul Concert Tour (Canada & USA)	Date: April 16–23, 2023	Special guest: Darren Espanto, MC and Lassy	
2023	Your Memejesty Queen VG	Date: June 2, 2023; Venue: Araneta Coliseum	Vice Ganda's 10th headlining sold-out concert at the Big Dome.; Special Guest: Lady Morgana, Zeus Collins, Jex de Castro & Jackie Gonzaga	

Co-headlining concerts
Year	Title	Co-headliner	Details	Notes	Ref.
2019	The Songbird and The Song Horse	Regine Velasquez	Date: February 14, 15 & 16, 2023; Venue: Araneta Coliseum	Special Guest: Robin Padilla	

Digital concerts
Year	Title	Details	Notes	Ref.
2021	Gandemic Vice Ganda: The VG-Tal Concert	Date: July 17, 2021	First-ever Digital Comedy Concert in the Philippines; Special Guest: Anne Curtis, Ice Seguerra and Awra	

== Awards and nominations ==
Award	Year (Note: Indicates the year of ceremony. Each year is linked to the article about the awards held that year, wherever possible.)	Nominee / Work	Category	Result	Ref.
Aliw Awards	2007	Vice Ganda	Best Stand-Up Comedy Act (Male)	Nominated	
Aliw Awards	2008	Vice Ganda	Best Stand-Up Comedy Act (Male)	Nominated	
Aliw Awards	2009	Vice Ganda	Best Stand-Up Comedy Act (Male)	Nominated	
Aliw Awards	2010	Vice Ganda	Best Stand-Up Comedy Act (Male)	Nominated	
Aliw Awards	2010	Gabby'ng K Ganda	Best Collaboration in a Concert (Shared with Gabby Concepcion and K Brosas.)	Nominated	
Aliw Awards	2010	May Nag-Text... 'Yung Totoo! Vice Ganda sa Araneta	Best Major Concert (Male)	Nominated	
Aliw Awards	2011	Eto Na... Vice Ganda, Todong Sample sa Araneta!	Best Special Concept Production	Nominated	
Aliw Awards	2011	Eto Na... Vice Ganda, Todong Sample sa Araneta!	Best Major Concert (Male)	Nominated	
Aliw Awards	2015	Vice Gandang Ganda Sa Sarili sa Araneta. Eh Di Wow!	Best Major Concert (Male)	Nominated	
Aliw Awards	2017	Pusuan Mo Si Vice Ganda sa Araneta	Best Major Concert (Male)	Nominated	
Aliw Awards	2018	Vice Cosmetics Ganda for All Concert	Best Major Concert (Male)	Nominated	
Aliw Awards	2019	The Songbird and The Song Horse	Best Collaboration in a Concert (Shared with Regine Velasquez.)	Nominated	
Aliw Awards	2019	Vice Ganda	People's Choice Award	Nominated	
Alta Media Icon Awards	2018	It's Showtime	Best Variety Show Host	Won	
Aral-Parangal Awards	2016	Vice Ganda	Best TV Personality	Won	
Aral-Parangal Awards	2016	Gandang Gabi, Vice!	Best Male Talk Show Host	Won	
Aral-Parangal Awards	2017	It's Showtime	Best Male TV Host	Won	
ASAP Pop Viewers' Choice Awards	2010	Petrang Kabayo	Pop Screen Kiss (Shared with Luis Manzano.)	Nominated	
ASAP Pop Viewers' Choice Awards	2011	Vice Ganda	Pop Male Fashionista	Nominated	
ASAP Pop Viewers' Choice Awards	2011	Vice Ganda	Pop Twittezen	Nominated	
ASAP Pop Viewers' Choice Awards	2012	Vice Ganda	Pop Twittezen	Nominated	
ASAP Pop Viewers' Choice Awards	2013	Vice Ganda	Pop Male Fashionista	Nominated	
ASAP Pop Viewers' Choice Awards	2013	Vice Ganda	Pop Netizen	Nominated	
ASAP Pop Viewers' Choice Awards	2014	Vice Ganda (Platinum Edition)	Pop Male Artist	Nominated	
ASAP Pop Viewers' Choice Awards	2014	Vice Ganda (Platinum Edition)	Pop Album	Nominated	
ASAP Pop Viewers' Choice Awards	2014	"Whoops Kirri"	Pop Movie Theme Song	Nominated	
ASAP Pop Viewers' Choice Awards	2014	Vice Ganda	Pop Male Fashionista	Nominated	
ASAP Pop Viewers' Choice Awards	2014	Vice Ganda	Pop Twittezen	Nominated	
ASAP Pop Viewers' Choice Awards	2014	Vice Ganda	Pop Instagrammer	Nominated	
ASAP Pop Viewers' Choice Awards	2014	Vice Ganda	Pop Instavideo	Won	
ASEAN Excellence Achievers Awards	2024	Vice Ganda	ASEAN Excellence for the Most Influential Multimedia Artist	Won	
Asian Academy Creative Awards	2021	Everybody, Sing!	Best Entertainment Presenter/Host	Won	
Awit Awards	2014	"Karakaraka" (featuring Smugglaz)	Best Dance Recording	Nominated	
Awit Awards	2015	"Boom Panes"	Best Novelty Recording	Nominated	
Awit Awards	2016	"Wag Kang Pabebe"	Best Novelty Recording	Nominated	
Awit Awards	2017	"Chuva Choo Choo 2.0" (with Jolina Magdangal)	Best Novelty Recording	Nominated	
Awit Awards	2018	"Gigil si Aquo"	Best Novelty Recording	Nominated	
Awit Awards	2021	"Corona Ba-Bye Na!"	Best Novelty Recording	Nominated	
Bahaghari Awards	2024	Vice Ganda	Bahaghari Champion	Won	
Bahaghari Awards	2024	Vice Ganda	LGBTQIA+ Role Model of the Year	Won	
Box Office Entertainment Awards	2011	Vice Ganda	Bert Marcelo Achievement Award for Excellence in Comedy	Won	
Box Office Entertainment Awards	2012	The Unkabogable Praybeyt Benjamin	Phenomenal Box Office Star	Won	
Box Office Entertainment Awards	2012	Eto Na... Vice Ganda, Todong Sample sa Araneta!	Male Concert Performer of the Year	Won	
Box Office Entertainment Awards	2013	Sisterakas	Phenomenal Box Office Star (Shared with Kris Aquino and Ai Ai delas Alas.)	Won	
Box Office Entertainment Awards	2014	Girl, Boy, Bakla, Tomboy	Phenomenal Box Office Star	Won (Note: Tied with Vic Sotto.)	
Box Office Entertainment Awards	2014	I-Vice Ganda Mo 'Ko sa Araneta	Male Concert Performer of the Year	Won	
Box Office Entertainment Awards	2015	The Amazing Praybeyt Benjamin	Phenomenal Box Office Star	Won	
Box Office Entertainment Awards	2016	Beauty and the Bestie	Phenomenal Box Office Star (Shared with Coco Martin.)	Won (Note: Tied with Bea Alonzo and John Lloyd Cruz.)	
Box Office Entertainment Awards	2017	The Super Parental Guardians	Phenomenal Box Office Star (Shared with Coco Martin.)	Won	
Box Office Entertainment Awards	2018	Gandarrapiddo: The Revenger Squad	Phenomenal Box Office Star (Shared with Daniel Padilla and Pia Wurtzbach.)	Won	
Box Office Entertainment Awards	2019	Fantastica	Phenomenal Box Office Star (Shared with Richard Gutierrez and Dingdong Dantes.)	Won (Note: Tied with Kathryn Bernardo and Daniel Padilla.)	
EdukCircle Awards	2012	Gandang Gabi, Vice!	Best TV Comedian	Won	
EdukCircle Awards	2014	Gandang Gabi, Vice!	Best TV Comedian	Won	
EdukCircle Awards	2014	Gandang Gabi, Vice!	Best Talk Show Host	Won	
EdukCircle Awards	2014	Girl, Boy, Bakla, Tomboy	Most Influential Film Actor of the Year	Won (Note: Tied with Piolo Pascual, Vic Sotto, and Xian Lim.)	
EdukCircle Awards	2015	Gandang Gabi, Vice!	Best TV Personality in Comedy	Won	
EdukCircle Awards	2015	Gandang Gabi, Vice!	Best Talk Show Host	Won	
EdukCircle Awards	2015	The Amazing Praybeyt Benjamin	Most Influential Film Celebrity of the Year	Won	
EdukCircle Awards	2015	Vice Gandang Ganda Sa Sarili sa Araneta. Eh Di Wow!	Most Influential Concert Performer of the Year	Won (Note: Tied with Toni Gonzaga, Alex Gonzaga, Anne Curtis, Darren Espanto, and Regine Velasquez.)	
EdukCircle Awards	2016	Gandang Gabi, Vice!	Most Outstanding TV Personality in Comedy	Won	
EdukCircle Awards	2016	Beauty and the Bestie	Most Influential Film Actor of the Year	Won (Note: Tied with Coco Martin, Vic Sotto, and John Lloyd Cruz.)	
EdukCircle Awards	2016	Beauty and the Bestie	Box Office Tandem of the Year (Shared with Coco Martin.)	Won	
EdukCircle Awards	2017	The Super Parental Guardians	Most Influential Film Actor of the Year	Won (Note: Tied with Daniel Padilla, Coco Martin, Enrique Gil, and Dingdong Dantes.)	
EdukCircle Awards	2017	Vice Ganda	Comedy Hall of Fame	Won	
EdukCircle Awards	2018	Gandang Gabi, Vice!	Best Entertainment Talk Show Host	Won	
EdukCircle Awards	2018	Gandarrapiddo: The Revenger Squad	Most Influential Film Actor of the Year	Won (Note: Tied with Empoy Marquez, Daniel Padilla, Coco Martin, and Dingdong Dantes.)	
EdukCircle Awards	2019	It's Showtime	Best Male Noontime Show Host	Won	
EdukCircle Awards	2019	Fantastica	Most Influential Film Actor of the Year (Hall of Fame)	Won	
EdukCircle Awards	2019	The Songbird and The Song Horse	Most Influential Concert Performer of the Year (Shared with Regine Velasquez.)	Won (Note: Tied with Lani Misalucha, Jona, and Darren Espanto.)	
EdukCircle Awards	2020	Vice Ganda	Most Influential Celebrities of the Decade	Won (Note: Tied with Sarah Geronimo, Daniel Padilla, Kathryn Bernardo, Maine Mendoza, Bea Alonzo, Coco Martin, Angel Locsin, Anne Curtis, and Alden Richards.)	
EVSU-OCC Students' Choice Mass Media Awards	2018	Vice Ganda	Best Comedian	Won	
EVSU-OCC Students' Choice Mass Media Awards	2019	Vice Ganda	Best Comedian	Won	
FAMAS Awards	2018	Vice Ganda	Comedy King Dolphy Memorial Award	Won	
FAMAS Awards	2025	Vice Ganda	Best Actor	Won (Note: Tied with Arjo Atayde)	
Gawad Lasallianeta	2017	Vice Ganda	Most Outstanding TV Personality	Won	
Gawad Lasallianeta	2019	Vice Ganda	Most Outstanding Male TV Personality	Won	
Gawad Lasallianeta	2019	Vice Ganda	Most Outstanding Twitter Influencer	Won	
Gawad Lasallianeta	2020	Gandang Gabi, Vice!	Most Outstanding Entertainment Talk Show Host	Won	
Gawad Lasallianeta	2020	Vice Ganda	Most Influential Entertainment Celebrity	Won	
Gawad Lasallianeta	2020	Vice Ganda	Most Effective Twitter Influencer	Won	
Gawad Lasallianeta	2022	It's Showtime	Most Outstanding Entertainment Show Host	Won	
Gawad Lasallianeta	2022	Vice Ganda	Most Effective Male Comedian	Won	
Gawad Lasallianeta	2023	It's Showtime	Most Outstanding Entertainment Show Host	Won	
Gawad Lasallianeta	2023	Vice Ganda	Most Influential Multimedia Filipino Celebrity	Won	
Gawad Lasallianeta	2023	Vice Ganda	Most Outstanding Twitter Influencer	Won	
Gawad Lasallianeta	2023	Vice Ganda	Most Outstanding Social Media Personality	Won	
Gawad Lasallianeta	2024	It's Showtime	Most Outstanding Male Entertainment Show Host	Won	
Gawad Lasallianeta	2024	Vice Ganda	Most Influential Filipino Celebrity	Won	
Gawad Lasallianeta	2024	Vice Ganda	Most Outstanding Social Media Personality	Won	
Gawad Lasallianeta	2024	Vice Ganda	Most Outstanding X Influencer	Won	
Gawad Tanglaw	2023	Vice Ganda	Gawad Dr. Debbie Francisco Para sa Sining at Kultura ng Pangmadlang Komunikasyon	Won	
Golden Laurel Lyceans' Choice Media Awards	2016	Gandang Gabi, Vice!	Best Talk Show Host	Won	
Golden Laurel Lyceans' Choice Media Awards	2017	Vice Ganda	Most Influential Social Media Personality	Won	
Golden Laurel Lyceans' Choice Media Awards	2017	Gandang Gabi, Vice!	Best Talk Show Host	Won	
Golden Laurel Lyceans' Choice Media Awards	2018	Gandang Gabi, Vice!	Best Talk Show Host	Won	
Golden Laurel Lyceans' Choice Media Awards	2019	Gandang Gabi, Vice!	Best Talk Show Host	Won	
Golden Laurel Lyceans' Choice Media Awards	2022	It's Showtime	Best Variety Show Host/s (Shared with It's Showtime hosts.)	Won	
Golden Screen TV Awards	2013	Gandang Gabi, Vice!	Outstanding Celebrity Talk Program Host	Nominated	
Golden Screen TV Awards	2013	It's Showtime	Outstanding Male Host in a Musical or Variety Program	Nominated	
Golden Screen TV Awards	2014	Gandang Gabi, Vice!	Outstanding Celebrity Talk Program Host	Nominated	
Golden Screen TV Awards	2014	It's Showtime	Outstanding Male Host in a Musical or Variety Program	Nominated	
Golden Screen TV Awards	2015	Gandang Gabi, Vice!	Outstanding Celebrity Talk Program Host	Won	
Golden Screen TV Awards	2015	It's Showtime	Outstanding Male Host in a Musical or Variety Program	Won	
Jeepney TV Fan Favorite Awards	2022	Gandang Gabi, Vice!	Favorite Talk Show Host	Won	
Jeepney TV Fan Favorite Awards	2022	Everybody, Sing!	Favorite Game/Reality Show Host	Nominated	
Jeepney TV Fan Favorite Awards	2022	It's Showtime	Favorite Musical/Variety Show Host	Nominated	
LGBTQ+ Icons of the Year Awards	2023	Vice Ganda	Icon of the Year	Won	
Metro Manila Film Festival	2012	Sisterakas	Best Actor	Nominated	
Metro Manila Film Festival	2013	Girl, Boy, Bakla, Tomboy	Best Actor	Nominated	
Metro Manila Film Festival	2024	And the Breadwinner Is...	Best Actor	Nominated	
Metro Manila Film Festival	2024	And the Breadwinner Is...	Special Jury Citation	Won	
Metro Manila Film Festival	2025	Call Me Mother	Best Actor	Won	
Myx Music Awards	2017	"Pasa Diyos" (with Young JV)	Favorite Urban Video	Nominated	
Nwssu Students' Choice Awards	2023	It's Showtime	Best Male Noontime Variety Show Host	Won	
Paragala Central Luzon Media Awards	2014	It's Showtime	Best Variety Show Host	Won	
Paragala Central Luzon Media Awards	2015	Gandang Gabi, Vice!	Best Talk Show Host	Won	
Paragala Central Luzon Media Awards	2015	It's Showtime	Best Variety Show Host	Won	
Paragala Central Luzon Media Awards	2016	Gandang Gabi, Vice!	Best Talk Show Host	Won	
Paragala Central Luzon Media Awards	2016	It's Showtime	Best Noontime Show Host	Won	
Paragala Central Luzon Media Awards	2016	Gandang Gabi, Vice!	Best Talk Show Host (Hall of Fame)	Won	
Paragala Central Luzon Media Awards	2018	It's Showtime	Best Noontime Show Host (Hall of Fame)	Won	
PEP List Awards	2014	Vice Ganda	Editors' Choice Male FAB Award	Nominated	
PEP List Awards	2015	It's Showtime	Editors' Choice Male TV Star of the Year	Won	
PEP List Awards	2016	Vice Ganda	Newsmaker of the Year	Nominated	
PEP List Awards	2016	Beauty and the Bestie	Male Movie Star of the Year	Nominated	
PEP List Awards	2017	It's Showtime	Male TV Star of the Year	Nominated	
PEP List Awards	2017	The Super Parental Guardians	Male Movie Star of the Year	Nominated	
Perpetualites' Choice Awards	2023	It's Showtime	Best Noontime Variety Host	Won	
Perpetualites' Choice Awards	2023	Everybody, Sing!	Best Game Show Host	Won	
Perpetualites' Choice Awards	2023	Vice Ganda	Most Service Oriented Personality	Won	
Perpetualites' Choice Awards	2023	Vice Ganda	Best TV Personality	Won	
Philippine Film Industry Month	2023	Vice Ganda	Most Iconic Filipino Comedian	Won (Note: Tied with Tito Sotto, Vic Sotto, Joey de Leon, Dolphy, Ai-Ai delas Alas, and Eugene Domingo.)	
Platinum Stallion National Media Awards	2023	It's Showtime	Best Variety Show Host	Won	
PMPC Star Awards for Movies	2011	"Kabayozong"	Movie Original Theme Song of the Year	Nominated	
PMPC Star Awards for Movies	2014	Girl, Boy, Bakla, Tomboy	Movie Actor of the Year	Won	
PMPC Star Awards for Movies	2016	Vice Ganda	Darling of the Press	Nominated	
PMPC Star Awards for Movies	2019	"Dahil Kasama"	Movie Original Theme Song of the Year	Nominated	
PMPC Star Awards for Music	2012	Lakas Tama	New Male Recording Artist of the Year	Nominated	
PMPC Star Awards for Music	2014	Vice Ganda	Male Recording Artist of the Year	Nominated	
PMPC Star Awards for Music	2014	Vice Ganda	Novelty Artist of the Year	Won	
PMPC Star Awards for Music	2014	Vice Ganda	Novelty Album of the Year	Won	
PMPC Star Awards for Music	2014	"Karakaraka" (featuring Smugglaz)	Novelty Song of the Year	Nominated	
PMPC Star Awards for Music	2014	"Manhid Ka"	Novelty Song of the Year	Nominated	
PMPC Star Awards for Music	2014	I-Vice Ganda Mo 'Ko sa Araneta	Concert of the Year	Nominated	
PMPC Star Awards for Music	2014	I-Vice Ganda Mo 'Ko sa Araneta	Male Concert Performer of the Year	Won	
PMPC Star Awards for Music	2015	#Trending	Male Recording Artist of the Year	Won (Note: Tied with Gloc-9.)	
PMPC Star Awards for Music	2015	#Trending	Dance Album of the Year	Nominated	
PMPC Star Awards for Music	2015	"Boom Panes"	Novelty Song of the Year	Won	
PMPC Star Awards for Music	2015	"Push Mo Yan Te" (featuring Regine Velasquez)	Novelty Song of the Year	Nominated	
PMPC Star Awards for Music	2015	Vice Gandang Ganda Sa Sarili sa Araneta. Eh Di Wow!	Concert of the Year	Won (Note: Tied with Martin Nievera, Gary Valenciano, Lani Misalucha, and Regine Velasquez.)	
PMPC Star Awards for Music	2015	Vice Gandang Ganda Sa Sarili sa Araneta. Eh Di Wow!	Male Concert Performer of the Year	Won	
PMPC Star Awards for Music	2016	"Wag Kang Pabebe"	Music Video of the Year	Won	
PMPC Star Awards for Music	2018	Pusuan Mo Si Vice Ganda sa Araneta	Concert of the Year	Nominated	
PMPC Star Awards for Music	2018	Pusuan Mo Si Vice Ganda sa Araneta	Male Concert Performer of the Year	Nominated	
PMPC Star Awards for Music	2020	The Songbird and The Song Horse	Concert of the Year (Shared with Regine Velasquez.)	Nominated	
PMPC Star Awards for Music	2020	The Songbird and The Song Horse	Male Concert Performer of the Year	Nominated	
PMPC Star Awards for Music	2020	"Dahil Kasama"	Novelty Artist of the Year	Nominated	
PMPC Star Awards for Music	2020	"Dahil Kasama"	Novelty Song of the Year	Won	
PMPC Star Awards for Music	2022	"Corona Ba-Bye Na!"	Novelty Artist of the Year	Nominated	
PMPC Star Awards for Music	2022	"Corona Ba-Bye Na!"	Novelty Song of the Year	Nominated	
PMPC Star Awards for Music	2024	"Rampa"	Novelty Artist of the Year	Nominated	
PMPC Star Awards for Music	2024	"Rampa"	Novelty Song of the Year	Won	
PMPC Star Awards for Television	2009	Maalaala Mo Kaya: Bola	Best Single Performance by an Actor	Nominated	
PMPC Star Awards for Television	2010	Showtime	Best Talent Search Program Hosts (Shared with Showtime hosts.)	Nominated	
PMPC Star Awards for Television	2011	Showtime	Best Talent Search Program Hosts (Shared with Showtime hosts.)	Nominated	
PMPC Star Awards for Television	2012	It's Showtime	Best Reality/Game Show Host (Shared with It's Showtime hosts.)	Won	
PMPC Star Awards for Television	2012	Gandang Gabi, Vice!	Best Male Celebrity/Showbiz-Oriented Talk Show Host	Won	
PMPC Star Awards for Television	2013	It's Showtime	Best Male TV Host	Nominated	
PMPC Star Awards for Television	2013	Gandang Gabi, Vice!	Best Celebrity Talk Show Host	Won	
PMPC Star Awards for Television	2014	It's Showtime	Best Male TV Host	Won	
PMPC Star Awards for Television	2014	Gandang Gabi, Vice!	Best Celebrity Talk Show Host	Won	
PMPC Star Awards for Television	2015	It's Showtime	Best Male TV Host	Won	
PMPC Star Awards for Television	2015	Gandang Gabi, Vice!	Best Celebrity Talk Show Host	Nominated	
PMPC Star Awards for Television	2016	It's Showtime	Best Male TV Host	Nominated	
PMPC Star Awards for Television	2016	Gandang Gabi, Vice!	Best Celebrity Talk Show Host	Nominated	
PMPC Star Awards for Television	2017	It's Showtime	Best Male TV Host	Won	
PMPC Star Awards for Television	2017	Gandang Gabi, Vice!	Best Celebrity Talk Show Host	Nominated	
PMPC Star Awards for Television	2018	It's Showtime	Best Male TV Host	Nominated	
PMPC Star Awards for Television	2018	Gandang Gabi, Vice!	Best Celebrity Talk Show Host	Nominated	
PMPC Star Awards for Television	2019	It's Showtime	Best Male TV Host	Won	
PMPC Star Awards for Television	2019	Gandang Gabi, Vice!	Best Celebrity Talk Show Host	Nominated	
PMPC Star Awards for Television	2021	It's Showtime	Best Male TV Host	Won	
PMPC Star Awards for Television	2021	Gandang Gabi, Vice!	Best Celebrity Talk Show Host	Nominated	
PMPC Star Awards for Television	2023	It's Showtime	Best Male TV Host	Nominated	
Push Awards	2015	Vice Ganda	Push Like Favorite Male Celebrity	Nominated	
Push Awards	2015	Vice Ganda	Push Tweet Most Loved Male Celebrity	Won	
Push Awards	2015	Vice Ganda	Awesome LOL Performance	Won	
Push Awards	2016	Vice Ganda	Push Male Celebrity of the Year	Won	
Push Awards	2016	Vice Ganda	Push Tweet Most Favorite Male Celebrity	Nominated	
Push Awards	2016	Vice Ganda	Push Gram Most Popular Male Celebrity	Won	
Push Awards	2016	Vice Ganda	Push Play Best Male Celebrity	Won	
Push Awards	2016	Vice Ganda	Push Awesome Popular Male Fashion Icon	Nominated	
Push Awards	2016	"Trumpets"	Push Awesome Popular Dance Cover	Nominated	
Push Awards	2016	Beauty and the Bestie	Push Awesome Popular Movie Performance	Won	
Push Awards	2017	Vice Ganda	Push Male Celebrity of the Year	Nominated	
Push Awards	2017	The Super Parental Guardians	Push Male Movie Performance of the Year	Nominated	
Push Awards	2017	It's Showtime	Push Celebrity Host of the Year	Nominated	
Push Awards	2019	Vice Ganda	Push Male Celebrity of the Year	Nominated	
Push Awards	2019	Gandarrapiddo: The Revenger Squad	Push Male Movie Performance of the Year	Nominated	
Push Awards	2019	It's Showtime	Push Celebrity Host of the Year	Won	
Push Awards	2019	Vice Ganda	Push Celebrity Style Inspo of the Year	Nominated	
Push Awards	2020	Vice Ganda	Push Happiness Ambassador	Won	
Push Awards	2020	Vice Ganda	Push True Love of the Year (Shared with Ion Perez.)	Nominated	
Push Awards	2020	Fantastica	Push Male Movie Performance of the Year	Nominated	
Push Awards	2022	Vice Ganda	Push Social Media Personality of the Year	Won	
Push Awards	2023	Vice Ganda	Push Power Couple of 2022 (Shared with Ion Perez.)	Nominated	
Push Awards	2024	Vice Ganda	Push Power Couple of 2023 (Shared with Ion Perez.)	Won	
Rawr Awards	2015	Vice Ganda	Celebrity of the Year (Male)	Nominated	
Rawr Awards	2015	Vice Ganda	Online Influencer of the Year	Won	
Rawr Awards	2015	It's Showtime	Trending Love Team of the Year (Shared with Karylle.)	Nominated	
Rawr Awards	2016	Vice Ganda	Fan Club of the Year (Shared with Karylle.)	Nominated	
Rawr Awards	2016	Vice Ganda	Best Social Media Campaign	Nominated	
Rawr Awards	2016	Gandang Gabi, Vice!	Favorite TV Host	Nominated	
Rawr Awards	2016	Vice Ganda	Royal Lion Award	Won	
Rawr Awards	2017	Pusuan Mo Si Vice Ganda sa Araneta	Favorite Performer	Nominated	
Rawr Awards	2017	It's Showtime	Pak na Pak na Comedian	Won	
Rawr Awards	2017	Gandang Gabi, Vice!	Favorite TV Host	Nominated	
Rawr Awards	2017	Vice Ganda	Magnanimous Lion Award	Nominated	
Rawr Awards	2018	It's Showtime	Pak na Pak na Comedian	Nominated	
Rawr Awards	2018	Gandang Gabi, Vice!	Favorite TV Host	Won	
Rawr Awards	2019	It's Showtime	Pak na Pak na Comedian	Nominated	
Rawr Awards	2019	Gandang Gabi, Vice!	Favorite TV Host	Won	
Rawr Awards	2020	It's Showtime	Pak na Pak na Comedian	Won	
Rawr Awards	2020	Gandang Gabi, Vice!	Favorite TV Host	Nominated	
Rawr Awards	2021	It's Showtime	Pak na Pak na Comedian	Nominated	
Rawr Awards	2021	Everybody, Sing!	Favorite TV Host	Won	
Rawr Awards	2021	Vice Ganda	Vlogger of the Year (Long)	Nominated	
Rawr Awards	2022	It's Showtime	Pak na Pak na Comedian	Won	
Rawr Awards	2022	Everybody, Sing!	Favorite TV Host	Won	
Rawr Awards	2022	Vice Ganda	Fan Club of the Year	Nominated	
Rawr Awards	2025	It's Showtime	Pak na Pak na Comedian	Nominated	
Rawr Awards	2025	It's Showtime	Love Team of the Year (Shared with Ion Perez.)	Nominated	
Rawr Awards	2025	Everybody, Sing!	Favorite TV Host	Won	
Rawr Awards	2025	Your Memejesty, Queen VG	Favorite Performer	Nominated	
Rawr Awards	2025	Vice Ganda	Vlogger of the Year (Long)	Nominated	
Rawr Awards	2025	Vice Ganda	LGBTQIA+ Influencer of the Year	Won	
Reader’s Digest Trusted Brand Awards	2019	Vice Ganda	Most Trusted Entertainment/Variety Presenter	Won	
Reader’s Digest Trusted Brand Awards	2020	Vice Ganda	Most Trusted Entertainment/Variety Presenter	Won	
Reader’s Digest Trusted Brand Awards	2021	Vice Ganda	Most Trusted Entertainment/Variety Presenter	Won	
Reader’s Digest Trusted Brand Awards	2022	Vice Ganda	Most Trusted Entertainment/Variety Presenter	Won	
Reader’s Digest Trusted Brand Awards	2023	Vice Ganda	Most Trusted Entertainment/Variety Presenter	Won	
Sine Sandaan: Celebrating the Luminaries of Philippine Cinema	2019	Vice Ganda	Male Comedian ng Sentenaryo	Included	
Star Cinema Online Awards	2015	Vice Ganda	Favorite Fandom (Shared with Karylle.)	Won	
Star Cinema Online Awards	2015	It's Showtime	Favorite TV Love Team (Shared with Karylle.)	Nominated	
Star Cinema Online Awards	2016	Vice Ganda	Favorite Fandom (Shared with Karylle.)	Nominated	
Star Cinema Online Awards	2016	It's Showtime	Favorite Love Team (Shared with Karylle.)	Nominated	
Tatt Awards	2012	Gandang Gabi, Vice!	Trending TV	Won	
Tatt Awards	2014	Vice Ganda	The One	Nominated	
Tatt Awards	2014	Vice Ganda	Trending Twitter Phenom of the Year	Won	
Tatt Awards	2014	Vice Ganda	Supreme Trendsetter of the Year	Won (Note: Tied with Zion Gutierrez.)	
Tatt Awards	2014	Vice Ganda	WeChat Choice of the Chatters	Won	
VP Choice Awards	2020	Vice Ganda	Fandom of the Year	Nominated	
VP Choice Awards	2022	Gandemic: The VG-Tal Concert	Performer of the Year	Nominated	
VP Choice Awards	2022	Vice Ganda	YouTuber of the Year	Won	
VP Choice Awards	2023	It's Showtime	TV Host of the Year	Won	
Yahoo OMG! Celebrity Awards	2011	Vice Ganda	Funniest Comedian	Won	
Yahoo OMG! Celebrity Awards	2011	It's Showtime	Favorite Male TV Host	Nominated	
Yahoo OMG! Celebrity Awards	2012	Vice Ganda	Comedian of the Year	Won	
Yahoo OMG! Celebrity Awards	2013	Vice Ganda	Comedian of the Year	Won	
Yahoo OMG! Celebrity Awards	2014	Vice Ganda	Social Media Star of the Year	Won	
Yahoo OMG! Celebrity Awards	2014	It's Showtime	Love Team of the Year (Shared with Karylle.)	Won	

== See also ==
- Vice Co. Blockbusters
