= 2025 Box Office Entertainment Awards =

Annual Philippine entertainment awards

- Date: June 28, 2025 (television broadcast July 13, 2025)
- Location: CPR Auditorium, RCBC Building, Makati City
- Hosted by: Pops Fernandez; Jasmine Curtis; Christian Bautista

Television/radio coverage
- Network: iWant

The 53rd Guillermo Mendoza Memorial Scholarship Foundation Box Office Entertainment Awards (GMMSF-BOEA) was an awarding ceremony honoring the actors, actresses, showbiz personalities, movies and TV programs in the Philippines.

The prestigious awarding ceremony took place on June 28, 2025 at the CPR Auditorium, RCBC Building, Makati City. The show was aired on July 13, 2025 via livestream on iWant. The ceremony was hosted by Pops Fernandez, Jasmine Curtis and Christian Bautista .

== Winners selection ==
The GMMSF honors Filipino actors, actresses and other performers' commercial success in the Philippine entertainment industry. The award giving body selects the high-ranking Philippine films for the calendar year 2023 based on total average rankings at box office published results as basis for awarding The Phenomenal Box Office Star, Movie Stars, Rising Stars and Television Awardees.

=== Winners ===
==== Film ====
Award	Name of Winner	Movie / Show
Phenomenal Box Office Queen	Kathryn Bernardo	Hello, Love, Again
Phenomenal Box Office King	Alden Richards	Hello, Love, Again
Film Actor of the Year	Piolo Pascual, Vic Sotto	The Kingdom
Film Actress of the Year	Marian Rivera	Balota
Movie Supporting Actor of the Year	Ruru Madrid, Joross Gamboa	Green Bones, Hello, Love, Again
Movie Supporting Actress of the Year	Nadine Lustre	Uninvited
Best Ensemble Acting for Movies	cast of Hello, Love, Again	Hello, Love, Again
Most Popular Film Producers	Star Cinema (ABS-CBN Studios), GMA Pictures	Hello, Love, Again
Most Popular Film Screenwriter	Olivia Lamasan, Carmi Raymundo and Crystal Hazel San Miguel	Hello, Love, Again
Most Popular Film Director	Cathy Garcia-Sampana	Hello, Love, Again

==== Television ====
Award	Name of Winner	Show (for individual awards) / Network
Primetime TV Actor of the Year for	Jericho Rosales	Lavender Fields
Primetime TV Actress of the Year	Jodi Sta. Maria	Lavender Fields
Daytime TV Actor of the Year	Richard Yap	Abot-Kamay na Pangarap
Daytime TV Actress of the Year	Jillian Ward	Abot-Kamay na Pangarap
Prince of Philippine Entertainment	Donny Pangilinan	
Princess of Philippine Entertainment	Belle Mariano	
Promising Male Star	Andres Muhlach	
Promising Female Star	Atasha Muhlach	
Most Popular loveteam of Philippine Entertainment	Paulo Avelino and Kim Chiu	What's Wrong with Secretary Kim
Most Promising Loveteam	Maris Racal and Anthony Jennings	
TV Supporting Actor of the Year	John Estrada	FPJ's Batang Quiapo
TV Supporting Actress of the Year	Janine Gutierrez	Lavender Fields
Comedy Actor of the Year	Roderick Paulate	
Comedy Actress of the Year	Maricel Soriano	
Most Popular Child Performer	Raphael Landincho	Voltes V: Legacy
Best Ensemble Acting for Television	Cast of Lavender Fields	Lavender Fields
Most Popular TV Program (News & Public Affairs)	24 Oras	GMA Network
Most Popular TV Program (Primetime Drama)	FPJ's Batang Quiapo	Kapamilya Channel, A2Z and TV5
Most Popular TV Program (Afternoon Drama)	Abot-Kamay na Pangarap	GMA Network
Most Popular TV Program (Talk Show)	Fast Talk with Boy Abunda	GMA Network
Most Popular TV Program (Reality/Talent/Game)	Family Feud	GMA Network
Most Popular TV Program (Noontime/Musical-Variety)	ASAP	Kapamilya Channel, A2Z and TV5
Male TV Host of the Year	Robi Domingo	Pinoy Big Brother: Gen 11
Female TV Host of the Year	Anne Curtis	It's Showtime

==== Music ====
Award	Name of Winner	Show or Song/Album
Concert of the Year	BINI	BINIverse
Male Concert Performer of the Year	Martin Nievera	
Female Concert Performer of the Year	Pops Fernandez	
Recording Artist of the Year	TJ Monterde	
Most Popular Recording/Performing Group	BINI	BINIverse

==== Special awards ====
Award	Name of Winner
Bert Marcelo Lifetime Achievement Award	Jimmy Santos
Corazon Samaniego Lifetime Achievement Award	Tirso Cruz III
George Canseco Lifetime Achievement	Homer Flores

==== Posthumous Awards for Entertainment Icons ====
Posthumous Awards	Awardee
Entertainment Icons	Nora Aunor
Entertainment Icons	Gloria Romero
Entertainment Icons	Hajji Alejandro
Entertainment Icons	Ricky Davao

==== Recognition for Excellence ====
Award	Name of Winner
Most Outstanding Government Service	Mayor Vico Sotto
Most Outstanding Businesswoman Award	Rhea Anecoche-Tan
Most Outstanding Philanthropist of the Year	Virginia Rodriguez
