= The Super Parental Guardians =

- Theatrical release poster
- Directed by: Joyce Bernal
- Screenplay by: Danno Kristoper Mariquit; Alpha Habon
- Story by: Jose Marie Viceral; Rodel Nacianceno; Alpha Habon
- Produced by: Charo Santos-Concio; Malou N. Santos
- Starring: Vice Ganda; Coco Martin
- Cinematography: Eli Balce
- Edited by: Beng Bandong; Joyce Bernal
- Music by: Carmina Cuya
- Production company: ABS-CBN Film Productions
- Distributed by: Star Cinema
- Release date: November 30, 2016
- Running time: 114 minutes
- Country: Philippines
- Language: Filipino
- Box office: ₱598 million

The Super Parental Guardians is a 2016 Philippine action comedy film starring Vice Ganda and Coco Martin. The film is directed by Joyce Bernal and is under the production of Star Cinema. The film marks the second feature film collaboration between Coco and Vice after Beauty and the Bestie. This is Vice Ganda's first film without the involvement of VIVA Films and the first to be directed by Bernal since Wenn V. Deramas' death in February 2016. This also marks as Vice Ganda's first non-MMFF movie, together with Enteng Kabisote 10 and the Abangers since This Guy's in Love with U Mare! in 2012.

The film grossed ₱598 million and became one of the highest grossing Filipino films of all time. The film also held the record for highest opening day gross of all Filipino films, at ₱75 million at that time.

== Plot ==
Paco is a gang leader known for starting gang wars in their slum neighborhood. Ariel "Arci" Ciriaco works as an executive assistant to Marife Delos Santos, wife of General Aldo Delos Santos. Marife asks Arci if he could be the caretaker of their house, or she will not sponsor his plan to go to South Korea. Arci meets his long-time friend Sarah after Arci's visa to South Korea is approved. Sarah asks Arci to take care of her sons Melvin "Megan" Gaspar and Ernie if anything happens to her, especially from the notorious crime syndicate Addictus Anonymous, who kill people who are addicted to anything. Sarah goes to Arci's house with a knife stabbed in her back and a placard stating that she was addicted to balut. Before dying, Sarah asks Arci to take her sons. At her funeral, Arci encountered Paco and told him that he is here to take the children. But Paco threatens him and says he would be the one to take care of his nephews until Paco decides to stay with Arci along with Megan and Ernie. He says that they will leave when he finds out who killed his sister. Megan also finds out that Arci is in love with Paco. Megan does not want to replace his mother because Paco is like a father to him and Ernie. Now, the Addictus Anonymous is targeting those who are traitors in their organization. In Sarah's diary, they discover that she had a relationship with three men, who were members of Addictus Anonymous that were later killed.

Megan and Ernie are kidnapped by Marife's men. Paco and Arci catch Clumsy and there, she admits that the children were brought to a train station. Paco, his men and Arci come to save Megan and Ernie. Arci enters the train and knocks down Marife. They pour gasoline and started a fire, causing the train to explode. Arci and the children escape unharmed.

== Cast ==
=== Main cast ===
- Vice Ganda as Ariel Ciriaco "Arci" Taulava
- Coco Martin as Neil "Paco" Nabati

=== Supporting cast ===
- Matet de Leon as Sarah Nabati
- Assunta De Rossi as Maria Felicidad "Marife" Delos Santos
- Kiray as Liza de Lima
- Lassy Marquez as Nadine Monio
- MC Calaquian as Kathryn "Kat-tunying" Taberna
- Pepe Herrera as Totoy Buto
- Negi as Clumsy Binay
- Awra Briguela as Melvin Gaspar "Megan" Nabati
- Onyok Pineda as Ernesto "Ernie" Nabati
- Joem Bascon as Jake Alangkwenka
- Lao Rodriguez as Buboy
- Kiko Matos as GGGC Gangster
- Jack Love Falcis as GGGC Gangster
- Relleyson Salazar - Taong Grasa
- Kevin Delgado as Delfin Nabati (Sarah and Paco's father)
- Angelina Kanapi
- Derick Hubalde

=== Special participation ===
- Bela Padilla as Emmy Soriano
- Jhong Hilario as Val Santos
- Allan Paule as Dylan Dioko
- Jeric Raval as Alex Soriano
- Emilio Garcia as Gen. Ronwaldo "Gen. Aldo" Delos Santos
- Baron Geisler as ADIKTUS Gangster
- Kim Idol as Brgy. Captain

== Production ==
Vice Ganda announced on September 8, 2016, that the shooting for his film with Coco Martin has begun. The film was directed by Joyce Bernal. By November 2016, the production of the film is already done.

== Release ==
On November 7, 2016, Vice stated that his film, then entitled Super Parental Guidance or SPG was already submitted as an entry for the 2016 Metro Manila Film Festival (MMFF) beating the deadline set by the MMFF which was on November 2. The film was not selected as one of the 8 entries to be shown in the film festival. On November 21, Star Cinema announced that the movie would be released in theaters on November 30, 2016.

The film was initially shown in the Philippines at 240 cinemas but was later increased to 280 and then 309 cinemas due to public demand and popularity.

=== Marketing ===
The trailer for the film was released on November 21, 2016, which shows that the title of the film was changed to The Super Parental Guardians.

=== Soundtrack ===
"Ang Kulit", an original composition by Vice Ganda, was released as the movie's official theme song. It was first heard on November 21, 2016, via MOR 101.9 during a late night show with DJ Joco Loco. Vice and Coco performed the song on ASAP stage on November 27, 2016, as part of the movie's promotion. They are joined by child stars Awra Briguela and Onyok Pineda who are also part of the movie.

== Reception ==
=== Box office ===
Upon its release, The Super Parental Guardians eventually became a box office success earning ₱75 million on its first day breaking the record of My Bebe Love in 2015 which grossed Php 60.5 million on its first day. By December 8, 2016, the film already garnered at least ₱300 million.

About two weeks later on December 24, 2016, the film breached the ₱500 million mark. By January 3, 2017, the film already managed to earn ₱590.1 million

=== Critical response ===
It received generally negative reviews from critics. Oggs Cruz of Rappler gave a negative review, commenting on the film's plot as "unsurprisingly threadbare", and adds that "[it] fails to be the powerful thing it could and should have been [...] it desensitizes the public to the horrors of whatever is happening in society." Reviewer Jansen Musico of CNN Philippines was displeased with the film, commenting that "[T]his two-hour vaudeville is entertaining in small, healthy doses. Anything more feels like a waste of neurons." [...] [M]any of the film's jokes are one-offs that are overstuffed into a thin, flimsy script, bloating it with news and pop culture references that add nothing to the main story arc."

On the other hand, a reviewer from Philippine Daily Inquirer's Bandera praised the film, giving a score of 9 out of 10, writing that the film "is so light it perfectly fits for Pinoys who only want to be entertained this Christmas," and "delivers its purpose to make audiences laugh hard that many of them need despite with what's currently happening in the country."
