= My Ex and Whys =

- Theatrical release poster
- Directed by: Cathy Garcia-Molina
- Written by: Jancy Nicolas; Gilliann Ebreo; Cathy Garcia-Molina
- Produced by: Charo Santos-Concio; Malou Santos
- Starring: Enrique Gil; Liza Soberano
- Cinematography: Noel Teehankee
- Edited by: Marya Ignacio
- Music by: Jessie Lasaten
- Production company: ABS-CBN Film Productions
- Distributed by: Star Cinema
- Release date: February 15, 2017
- Running time: 120 minutes
- Countries: Philippines; South Korea
- Languages: Filipino; English; Korean
- Box office: ₱400 million

My Ex and Whys is a 2017 Philippine romantic comedy drama film directed and co-written by Cathy Garcia-Molina. Starring Enrique Gil and Liza Soberano, the story is about a womanizer named Gio (Gil), who tries to prove he is a changed man to his ex-girlfriend, a blogger named Cali (Soberano). Cali, on the other hand, tests if Gio really has changed, and things do not go as planned. The film was released on February 15, 2017, to commercial and critical success, grossing over ₱400 million worldwide. My Ex And Whys is the highest-grossing film to be starred by Soberano and Gil to date.

== Cast ==
=== Main cast ===
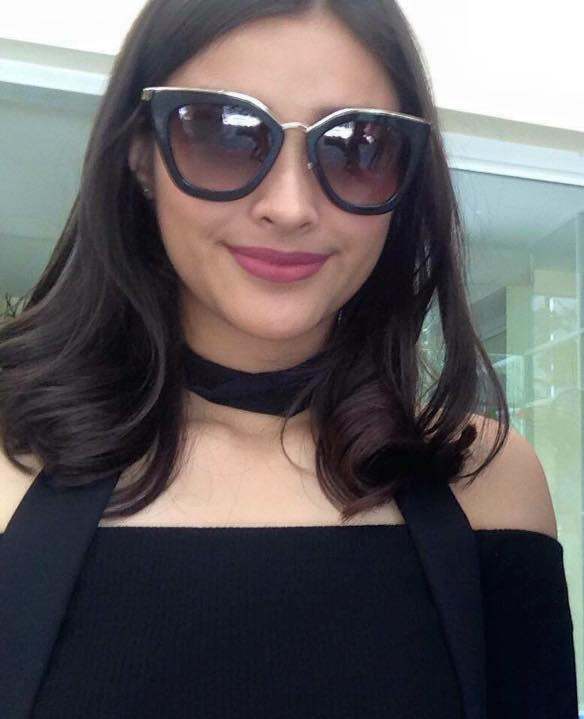
Liza Soberano portrays Calista "Cali" Ferrer

- Enrique Gil as Sergio "Gio" Martinez
- Liza Soberano as Calista "Cali" Ferrer

=== Supporting cast ===
- Joey Marquez as Lincoln "Master Pops" Martinez
- Cai Cortez as Candelaria "Tita Candy" Ferrer
- Emilio Garcia as Calixto Ferrer, Cali's father
- Arlene Muhlach as "Tita Libby", Cali's aunt
- Ara Mina as "Mommy Dolly", Cali's mother
- Ryan Bang as Lee
- Joross Gamboa as Mustang Martinez
- Jeffrey Tam as Daryl
- Karen Reyes as Nina
- Neil Coleta as Patrick
- Dominic Roque as Jaguar Martinez
- Nicco Manalo as Bert (Gio & Cali's friend)
- Hyubs Azarcon as Kia
- Xander Gallego as Ford Martinez
- Kim Si-won as Kim Yu-Ri (Lee's fiancé)
- Kim Da-yul as Ha-Na (Yu-Ri's best friend)
- Kimi Bo-ram as Shannon (Ha-Na's sister)
- Joseph Kyle Pablo as Cali's younger twin brother
- Jello Andrei Pablo as Cali's younger twin brother
- Timothy Ancheta as Fred
- John Uy as Darly's boyfriend
- Hannah Ledesma as Angeli

=== Special participation ===
- Diego Loyzaga as Guy Customer
- Sofia Andres as Lady Customer

=== Cameo appearances ===
- Sandara Park
- Karylle
- Jhong Hilario
- Billy Crawford
- Vhong Navarro
- Anne Curtis
- Kathryn Bernardo
- Daniel Padilla

== International release ==
TFC released My Ex and Whys internationally around the same time said film was released in the Philippines. In North America, the film earned $434,000 on its first 3 days. Then, on its fourth day, it was estimated to have earned $630,000. On its 3rd weekend (ending March 5, 2017), the film earned an additional $110,000, summing up its 3-week North America gross to $1,300,000

On February 26, My Ex and Whys registers total earnings of $5 million worldwide. This is composed of $4 million opening week gross in the Philippines and $1 million opening week gross from screenings in the Middle East, Europe, U.S. and Canada.

The film's commercial run has been extended in the U.S., Middle East, Canada and Southeast Asia.

== Reception ==
=== Box office ===
My Ex and Whys earned ₱31.5 million on its opening day, and the figure increased to ₱100 million in three days. Another milestone was made as the film crossed over the ₱200 million mark in 8 days. After 17 days, the movie earned ₱341 million worldwide. On August 11, 2017, ABS-CBN released its first-half annual report where it announced that My Ex and Whys brought in over ₱400 million in ticket sales in its entire run in the cinemas.

=== Critical reception ===
Mari-an Santos of Philippine Entertainment Portal praised the two lead actors, stating that "the two have undeniable chemistry and play off each other well, whether it is in intense scenes or very casual time-wasters." Oggs Cruz from Rappler commented that Soberano "is able to charm her way out of her character’s inexplicable immaturity. Gil, on the other hand, plays the suffering ex-boyfriend with ample enthusiasm. If My Ex and Whys is meant to be a simple showcase of a love team’s power to arouse fantasy and make-believe, then it seems like it is all worth it." Philbert Dy through The Neighborhood complained that "the movie just takes it in a really bizarre, toxic direction. It essentially has its female protagonist go to borderline illegal lengths in order to prove herself right, the movie apparently unable to conceive of a way to display the pain that she went through without resorting to ludicrous antics. After that, it’s hard to buy into why this relationship needs to happen. The film, like so many of these romcoms, just takes the pairing for granted."

== Awards and nominations ==
Year	Award	Category	Recipient(s)	Result
2017	48th GMMSF Box-Office Entertainment Awards	Most Popular Love Team of the Year	Liza Soberano and Enrique Gil	Won
2017	7th EdukCircle Awards	Most Influential Film Actor of the Year	Enrique Gil	Won
2017	7th EdukCircle Awards	Most Influential Film Actress of the Year	Liza Soberano	Won
2017	RAWR Awards	Favorite Movie ng Taon	My Ex and Whys	Nominated
2017	4th Star Cinema Online Awards	Ultimate Movie Line	Liza Soberano	Won
2017	4th Star Cinema Online Awards	Ultimate Female Movie Star	Liza Soberano	Won
2017	4th Star Cinema Online Awards	Ultimate Male Movie Star	Enrique Gil	Won
2017	4th Star Cinema Online Awards	Ultimate Movie of the Year	My Ex and Whys	Won
2018	49th GMMSF Box-Office Entertainment Awards	Box Office King	Enrique Gil	Won
2018	49th GMMSF Box-Office Entertainment Awards	Box Office Queen	Liza Soberano	Won
