= 2018 Box Office Entertainment Awards =

Annual Philippine entertainment awards

- Date: May 20, 2018
- Location: Newport Performing Arts Theater, Resorts World Manila, Pasay
- Hosted by: Enchong Dee; Robi Domingo; Arci Muñoz; Xian Lim; Yassi Pressman; Iza Calzado

Television/radio coverage
- Network: ABS-CBN
- Directed by: Bert de Leon

The 49th Guillermo Mendoza Memorial Scholarship Foundation Box Office Entertainment Awards (GMMSF-BOEA) was an awards ceremony honoring actors, actresses, showbiz personalities, movies, and television programs in the Philippines. It was held on May 20, 2018, at the Newport Performing Arts Theater in Resorts World Manila, Pasay.

The awards night was hosted by ABS-CBN personalities Enchong Dee, Robi Domingo, Arci Muñoz, Xian Lim, Yassi Pressman, and Iza Calzado. The event was broadcast on ABS-CBN's "Sunday's Best" on May 27, 2018.

== Winners selection ==
The GMMSF honors the commercial success of Filipino actors, actresses, and other performers in the Philippine entertainment industry, regardless of artistic merit. The awarding body selects the highest-grossing Philippine films of 2017, using total average box office rankings as the basis for determining the recipients of its three major awards: the Phenomenal Box Office Star, the Box Office King, and the Box Office Queen.

=== Winners ===
==== Film ====
Award	Name of Winner	Movie / Show
Phenomenal Box Office Star	Vice Ganda, Daniel Padilla, Pia Wurtzbach	Gandarrapiddo: The Revenger Squad
Box Office King	Enrique Gil	My Ex and Whys
Box Office Queen	Liza Soberano	My Ex and Whys
Film Actor of the Year	Aga Muhlach, Dingdong Dantes	Seven Sundays
Film Actress of the Year	Iza Calzado	Bliss
Prince of Philippine Movies and Television	Daniel Padilla	Can't Help Falling in Love / La Luna Sangre (ABS-CBN)
Princess of Philippine Movies and Television	Kathryn Bernardo	Can't Help Falling in Love / La Luna Sangre (ABS-CBN)
Breakthrough Actor of the Year	Empoy Marquez	Kita Kita
Movie Supporting Actor of the Year	Matteo Guidicelli	Can't Help Falling in Love
Movie Supporting Actress of the Year	Cristine Reyes	Seven Sundays
Most Popular Loveteam of Movies & TV	Joshua Garcia, Julia Barretto	Love You to the Stars and Back
Breakthrough Movie Loveteam of the Year	Alessandra de Rossi, Empoy Marquez	Kita Kita
Most Promising Actor	Ruru Madrid	Meant to Beh / Encantadia, Alyas Robin Hood (GMA Network)
Most Promising Actress	Joanna Ampil	Ang Larawan
Most Popular Male Child Performer	Sebastian Benedict	Meant to Beh / Eat Bulaga! (GMA Network)
All-Time Favorite Actor	Robin Padilla	Unexpectedly Yours
All-Time Favorite Actress	Sharon Cuneta	Unexpectedly Yours
Most Popular Film Producers	Piolo Pascual, Joyce E. Bernal, Erickson Raymundo	Kita Kita (Spring Films)
Most Popular Film Screenwriter	Sigrid Andrea Bernardo	Kita Kita
Most Popular Film Director	Rodel Nacianceno	Ang Panday
Comedy Actor of the Year	Vic Sotto	Meant to Beh / Hay, Bahay! (GMA Network)

==== Television ====
Award	Name of Winner	Show (for individual awards) / Network
TV Actor of the Year	Gabby Concepcion	Ika-6 na Utos (GMA Network)
TV Actress of the Year	Maja Salvador	Wildflower (ABS-CBN)
Most Promising Loveteam of Movies & TV	McCoy de Leon, Elisse Joson	The Good Son (ABS-CBN)
Most Popular Female Child Performer	Nayomi "Heart" Ramos	My Dear Heart (ABS-CBN)
Most Popular TV Program for News & Public Affairs	Kapuso Mo, Jessica Soho	GMA Network
Most Popular TV Program for Primetime Drama	Ang Probinsyano	ABS-CBN
Most Popular TV Program for Daytime Drama	Wildflower	ABS-CBN
Most Popular TV Program for Talent Search, Reality, Talk and Game Show	I Can See Your Voice	ABS-CBN
Most Popular TV Program for Musical-Variety	ASAP	ABS-CBN
Male TV Host of the Year	Robi Domingo	ASAP (ABS-CBN)
Female TV Host of the Year	Marian Rivera	Sunday PinaSaya (GMA Network)
Best Ensemble Performance	The Good Son	ABS-CBN
Comedy Actress of the Year	Angelica Panganiban	Banana Sundae (ABS-CBN)

==== Music ====
Award	Name of Winner
Male Concert Performer of the Year	Martin Nievera, Ogie Alcasid, Erik Santos
Female Concert Performer of the Year	Regine Velasquez–Alcasid
Male Recording Artist of the Year	Alden Richards
Female Recording Artist of the Year	KZ Tandingan
Most Promising Male Recording Artist of the Year	Iñigo Pascual
Most Promising Female Recording Artist of the Year	Moira Dela Torre
Most Promising Male Concert Artist of the Year	Darren Espanto
Most Promising Female Concert Artist of the Year	Jona, Morissette, Klarisse de Guzman (ASAP Birit Queens)
Most Promising Recording/Performing Group	BoyBandPH

==== Special awards ====
Award	Name of Winner
Bert Marcelo Lifetime Achievement Award	Janno Gibbs
Corazon Samaniego Lifetime Achievement Award	Aga Muhlach
Outstanding Public Service Award	Lito Atienza (Congressman, Buhay Party-List)
Outstanding Government Service Award	Imee Marcos (Governor, Ilocos Sur)
Outstanding Celebrity Businessman of the Year	Raymund Francisco
Special Award for Longest-Running and Highest-Rated Drama Anthology	Maynila (GMA Network)
