= Gandang Gabi Vice =

Philippine television talk show

- Title card in 2026
- Also known as: GGV
- Genre: Comedy; Late-night talk show
- Written by: Vince Bersola; Sol Caco; Regina Diane Noroña; Darla Sauler
- Directed by: Arnel Natividad
- Presented by: Vice Ganda
- Theme music composer: Christian Martinez
- Opening theme: "Gandang Gabi, Vice!" by Vice Ganda
- Country of origin: Philippines
- Original language: Tagalog

Production
- Executive producers: Lani Gutierrez; Gabby Lopez III; Charo Santos-Concio; Carlo Katigbak; Cory Vidanes; Laurenti Dyogi; Lui Andrada
- Production locations: Studios 2 & 10, ABS-CBN Broadcasting Center, Diliman, Quezon City, Metro Manila
- Cinematography: Ramon Catahan
- Editors: Niño Co; Cedric Czar Flores; Reynaldo D. Garcia; Emerson Luna; Jerwyn Tan
- Camera setup: Multiple-camera setup
- Production company: ABS-CBN Studios

Original release
- Network: ABS-CBN
- Release: May 22, 2011 – March 8, 2020
- Network: GMA Network
- Release: September 13, 2026 – present

Gandang Gabi Vice (transl. beautiful night Vice) is a Philippine television talk show broadcast by ABS-CBN and GMA Network. Hosted by Vice Ganda, it premiered on ABS-CBN's Yes Weekend line up on May 22, 2011. The show concluded on March 8, 2020. It returned on September 13, 2026, through GMA Network's Sunday evening line up.

== Overview ==
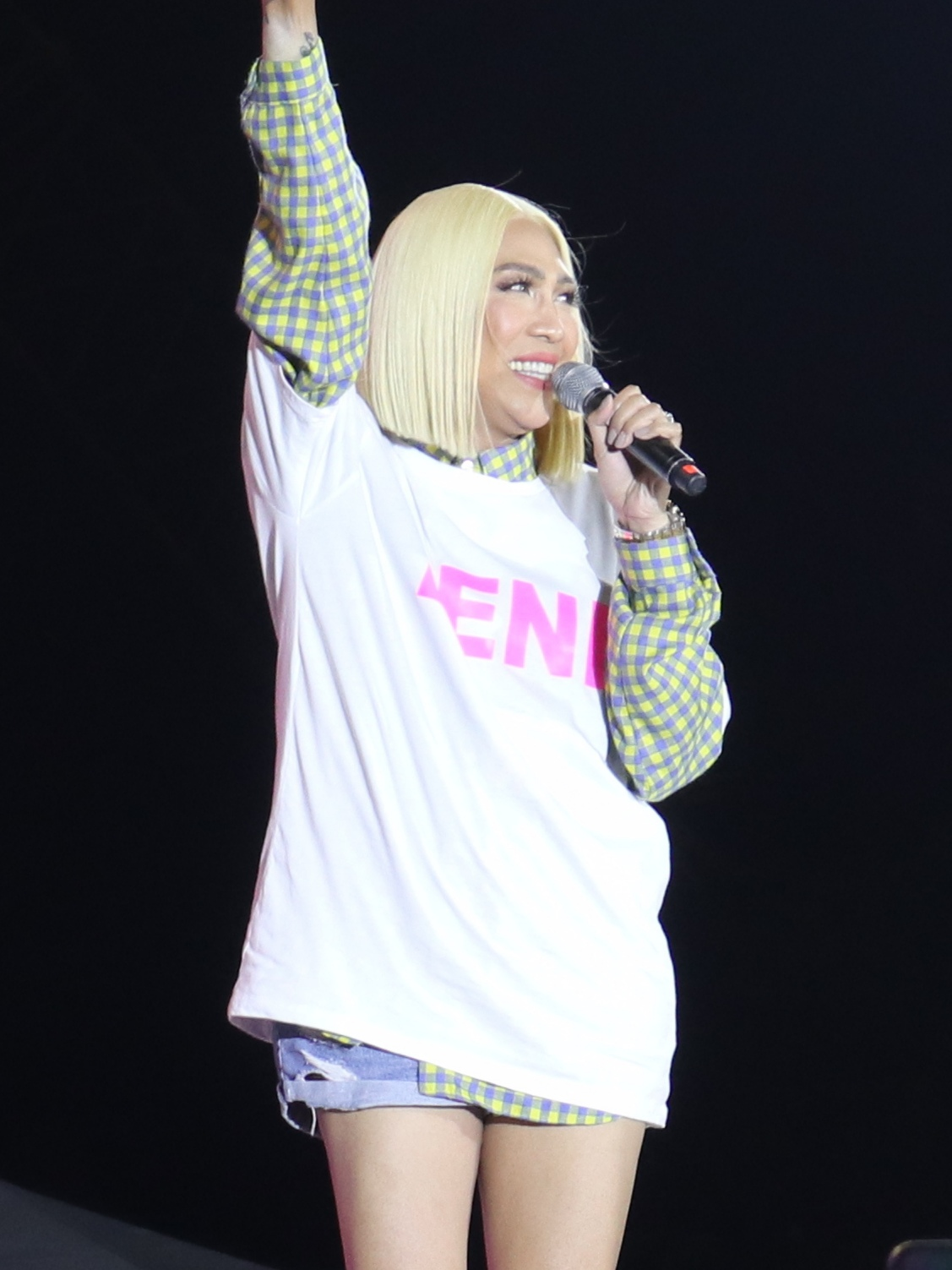
Vice Ganda serves as the host.

Hosted by comedian Vice Ganda, Gandang Gabi Vice premiered on May 22, 2011 on ABS-CBN. Originally slated to run for 12 episodes, it was given a 26 weeks extension. The show aired its final episode on ABS-CBN on March 8, 2020, with Raffy Tulfo as the show's final guest.

In August 2026, ABS-CBN Corporation announced the return of the show for a September 13, 2026 air date, on GMA Network. Uncut versions would be released on the streaming service, iWant. Actor Alden Richards served as the guest for the show's comeback episode.

== Production ==
Principal photography commenced on September 2, 2026, for its revival.

== Ratings ==
According to AGB Nielsen Philippines' Mega Manila households/People television ratings, the pilot episode of Gandang Gabi Vice earned an 11.8% rating. The final episode scored an 11.3% rating, according to Kantar Media Philippines.

According to AGB Nielsen Philippines' Nationwide Urban Television Audience Measurement People in television homes, the first episode of Gandang Gabi Vice on GMA Network earned a 4.3% rating.

== Accolades ==
Accolades received by Gandang Gabi Vice
Year	Award	Category	Recipient	Result	Ref.
2012	26th PMPC Star Awards for Television	Best Celebrity/Showbiz-Oriented Talk Show	Gandang Gabi Vice	Nominated	
2012	26th PMPC Star Awards for Television	Best Male Celebrity/Showbiz-Oriented Talk Show Host	Vice Ganda	Won	
2013	27th PMPC Star Awards for Television	Best Celebrity Talk Show	Gandang Gabi Vice	Nominated	
2013	27th PMPC Star Awards for Television	Best Celebrity Talk Show Host	Vice Ganda	Won	
2014	Golden Screen TV Awards	Outstanding Celebrity Talk Program	Gandang Gabi Vice	Nominated	
2014	Golden Screen TV Awards	Outstanding Celebrity Talk Program Host	Vice Ganda	Nominated	
2014	28th PMPC Star Awards for Television	Best Celebrity Talk Show	Gandang Gabi Vice	Won	
2014	28th PMPC Star Awards for Television	Best Celebrity Talk Show Host	Vice Ganda	Won	
2015	Golden Screen TV Awards	Outstanding Celebrity Talk Program	Gandang Gabi Vice	Won	
2015	Golden Screen TV Awards	Outstanding Celebrity Talk Program Host	Vice Ganda	Won	
2015	29th PMPC Star Awards for Television	Best Celebrity Talk Show	Gandang Gabi Vice	Nominated	
2015	29th PMPC Star Awards for Television	Best Celebrity Talk Show Host	Vice Ganda	Nominated	
2016	30th PMPC Star Awards for Television	Best Celebrity Talk Show	Gandang Gabi Vice	Nominated	
2016	30th PMPC Star Awards for Television	Best Celebrity Talk Show Host	Vice Ganda	Nominated	
2017	31st PMPC Star Awards for Television	Best Celebrity Talk Show	Gandang Gabi Vice	Nominated	
2017	31st PMPC Star Awards for Television	Best Celebrity Talk Show Host	Vice Ganda	Won	
2018	32nd PMPC Star Awards for Television	Best Celebrity Talk Show	Gandang Gabi Vice	Nominated	
2018	32nd PMPC Star Awards for Television	Best Celebrity Talk Show Host	Vice Ganda	Nominated	
2019	33rd PMPC Star Awards for Television	Best Celebrity Talk Show	Gandang Gabi Vice	Nominated	
2019	33rd PMPC Star Awards for Television	Best Celebrity Talk Show Host	Vice Ganda	Nominated	
2021	34th PMPC Star Awards for Television	Best Celebrity Talk Show	Gandang Gabi Vice	Nominated	
2021	34th PMPC Star Awards for Television	Best Celebrity Talk Show Host	Vice Ganda	Nominated	
