= Ben&Ben discography =

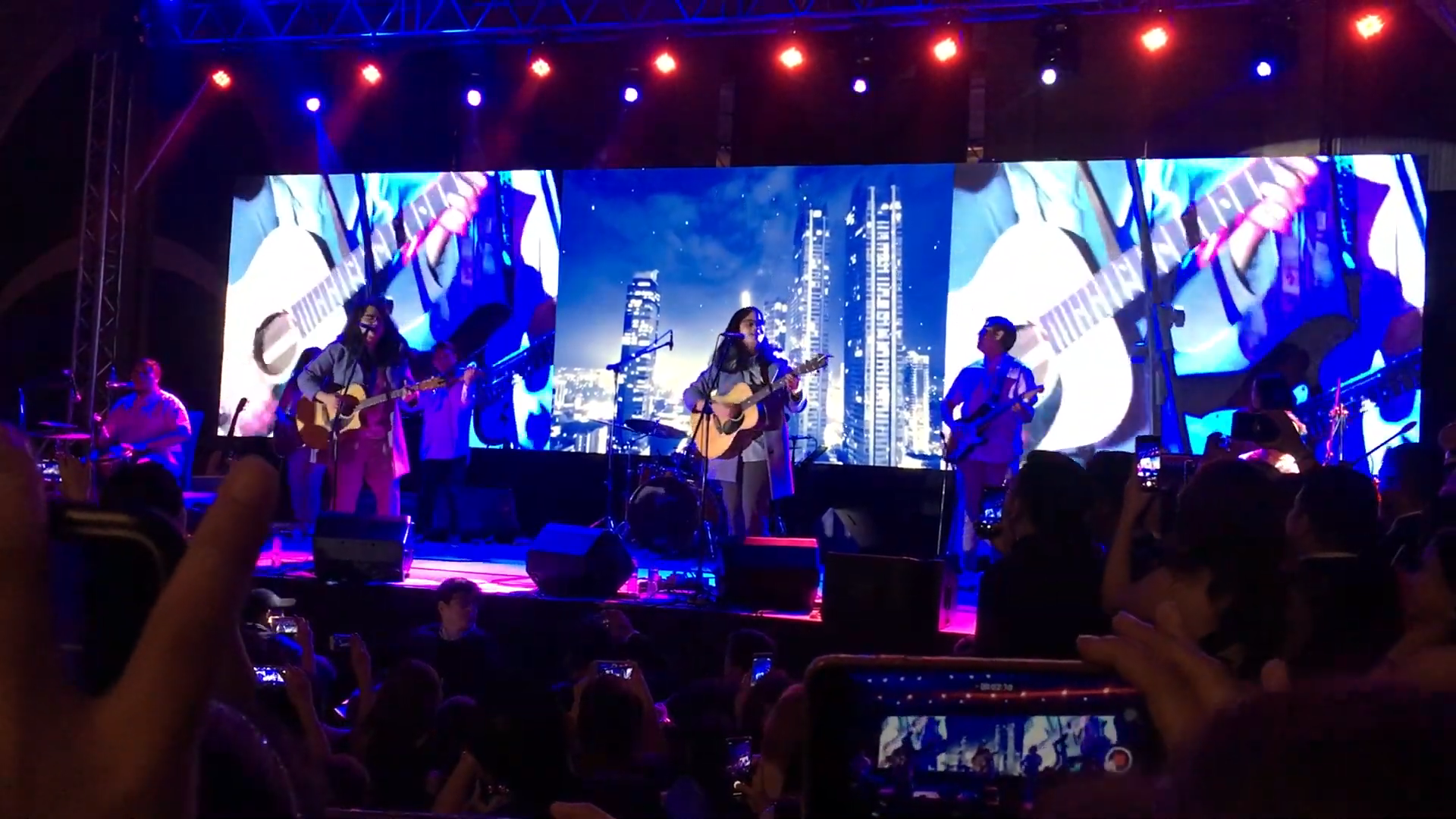
- Ben&Ben performing in 2018
- Studio albums: 4
- EPs: 1
- Singles: 38
- Music videos: 35
- Promotional singles: 15
- Charity singles: 2
- Soundtrack usages: 18

The Filipino indie folk-pop band Ben&Ben have released three studio albums, one extended play (EP), 38 singles, 15 promotional singles, and 2 charity singles under the record labels Sony Music Philippines and Sindikato. In addition, they have released 35 music videos, are featured in five singles and four music videos by other artists, and their songs have been used in 18 films and television series.

The band formed in 2016 as the Benjamins, composed of Paolo and Miguel Benjamin Guico, and debuted with the single "Tinatangi", for which they also made a music video. The duo later renamed and released an eponymous EP consisting of seven songs. In 2017, Ben&Ben expanded into an ensemble, adding Poch Barretto as electric guitarist, Jam Villanueva as drummer, Agnes Reoma as bassist, Patricia Lasaten as keyboardist, Toni Muñoz and Andrew de Pano as percussionists, as well as Keifer Cabugao as violinist, with the Guicos being acoustic guitarists. The band achieved recognition in 2018 for incorporating songs into several Filipino films (such as Goyo: The Boy General and Rewind) and television series (such as Coke Studio Homecoming and Pulang Araw). Ben&Ben released their debut studio album, Limasawa Street, in 2019 and their second, Pebble House, Vol. 1: Kuwaderno, in 2021. They have collaborated with various artists and recorded a charity single as part of the COVID-19 pandemic relief effort.

In April 2020, Ben&Ben jumped from 48th to 29th place in the Billboard Social 50 chart, which ranks artists by Internet engagements. In July, they ranked 1st in the South Korean music service Melon's real-time search following positive reviews of their song "Leaves" by various K-pop artists, notably by Young K of Day6, who made a 2020 cover version with Ben&Ben due to popular demand. The next month, Ben&Ben made cover versions of K-pop songs on their YouTube channel, in response to fan requests. Three days after its release, seven songs from Kuwaderno reached Spotify's Top 100 chart; the rest, as well as some of their previous songs, reached the Top 200 chart. In 2020 and 2021, the band was Spotify's most-streamed Original Pilipino Music (OPM) Artist and Group. In 2021, Ben&Ben set a new record in the folk pop genre, with "nearly 300 million streams in [over] 170 countries". The band have received various accolades locally and internationally, including the Awit Awards and NME Awards.

== Studio albums ==
List of studio albums by Ben&Ben
Title	Details	Sales	Certification	Ref.
Limasawa Street	Released: May 12, 2019; Label: Sony Music Philippines, Sindikato; Formats: 12" single, digital download, streaming, USB flash drive	PHL: 60,000	PARI: 4× Platinum	
Pebble House, Vol. 1: Kuwaderno	Released: August 29, 2021; Label: Sony Music Philippines; Formats: Digital download, streaming	—N/a	—N/a	
The Traveller Across Dimensions	Released: November 29, 2024; Label: Sony Music Philippines; Formats: Digital download, streaming	—N/a	—N/a	
Nine	Released: September 24, 2026; Label: Sony Music Philippines; Formats: Digital download, streaming	—N/a	—N/a	
"—" denotes album(s) that did not chart in a certain territory.

== Extended plays ==
List of extended plays by Ben&Ben
Title	Details	Ref.
Ben&Ben	Released: December 17, 2016 (PHL); Label: Sindikato; Format: 12" single, CD, digital download; Track listing: 1. "Ride Home"; 2. "Kathang Isip"; 3. "Kadena"; 4. "Susi"; 5. "Leaves"; 6. "Strange"; 7. "Dahilan"	

== Singles ==
=== As lead artist ===
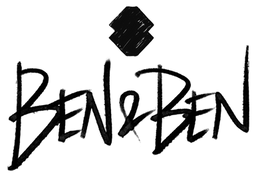

List of singles where Ben&Ben is lead artist
Title	Year	Album	Ref.
"Ride Home"	2017	Non-album singles	
"Leaves"	2017	Non-album singles	
"Kathang Isip"	2017	Non-album singles	
"Maybe the Night"	2017	Non-album singles	
"Sunrise"	2018	Non-album singles	
"Branches"	2018	Non-album singles	
"Ours" (Note: An alternate version of "Strange". It was released by the Elements Music Camp, of which Ben&Ben is a part.) (with HARV)	2018	Non-album singles	
"Mitsa (Salamat)"	2019	Limasawa Street	
"Araw-Araw"	2019	Limasawa Street	
"Pagtingin"	2019	Limasawa Street	
"Masyado Pang Maaga"	2019	Non-album singles	
"Sa Susunod na Habang Buhay"	2020	Non-album singles	
"Doors"	2020	Non-album singles	
"Lifetime"	2020	Non-album singles	
"Nakikinig Ka Ba Sa Akin"	2020	Non-album singles	
"Di Ka Sayang"	2020	Non-album singles	
"Inevitable"	2021	Non-album singles	
"Upuan"	2021	Pebble House, Vol. 1: Kuwaderno	
"Magpahinga"	2021	Pebble House, Vol. 1: Kuwaderno	
"Leaves" (with Young K)	2021	Non-album single	
"Pasalubong" (with Moira Dela Torre)	2021	Pebble House, Vol. 1: Kuwaderno	
"Sugat" (with Munimuni)	2021	Pebble House, Vol. 1: Kuwaderno	
"Lunod" (with Zild and Juan Karlos Labajo)	2021	Pebble House, Vol. 1: Kuwaderno	
"Paninindigan Kita"	2022	Non-album singles	
"Langyang Pag-ibig"	2022	Non-album singles	
"The Ones We Once Loved"	2022	Non-album singles	
"Dear"	2022	Non-album singles	
"Could Be Something"	2023	The Traveller Across Dimensions	
"Courage (Acoustic Version)"	2023	Non-album single	
"Autumn"	2023	The Traveller Across Dimensions	
"Courage"	2023	The Traveller Across Dimensions	
"Comets"	2024	The Traveller Across Dimensions	
"Comets" (with Petra Sihombing)	2024	Non-album single	
"Triumph"	2024	The Traveller Across Dimensions	
"New Dimensions"	2024	The Traveller Across Dimensions	
"Saranggola"	2025	Nine	
"Duyan"	2025	2026	Non-album single
"Lifetime (Reimagined)"	Nine	2026	
"Autumn (Reimagined)"	Nine	2026	
"Baybayin"	Non-album single	2026	
"Leaves (Reimagined)"	Nine	2026	

=== As featured artist ===
List of singles where Ben&Ben is featured artist
Title	Year	Main artist	Album	Ref.
"Paalam"	2019	Moira Dela Torre	Patawad	
"'Di Na Muli" (Note: Notes: Cover version of the song by The Itchyworms; Special single for Coke Studio Philippines Season 3)	2019	Bea Lorenzo; Clara Benin	Non-album singles	
"Mapa (Band Version)"	2021	SB19	Non-album singles	
"Cheap Love"	2021	WeiBird	Non-album singles	
"I'm Okay"	2025	Moira Dela Torre	Non-album singles	
"Heaven"	2025	Tilly Birds	I'll Remember To Forget You	

=== Promotional singles ===
List of promotional singles by Ben&Ben
Title	Year	Album	Ref.
"Tinatangi" (Note: One of the entries of PhilPop 2016 songwriting competition) (as The Benjamins; with Cookie Chua and Bayang Barrios)	2016	PhilPop 2016	
"Susi" (Note: Official soundtrack of Filipino film Goyo: The Boy General)	2016	Non-album single	
"Bibingka" (Note: One of the tracks of a compilation album by Stages Sessions titled Pintig ng Pasko)	2016	Pintig ng Pasko	
"Balik-Balikan" (Note: Special single for Coke Studio Philippines Season 2) (with Sam Concepcion)	2018	Non-album singles	
"Dati" (Note: Notes: Cover version of the song by Sam Concepcion and Tippy Dos Santos, featuring Quest; Special single for Coke Studio Philippines Season 2)	2018	Non-album singles	
"Beautiful Girl - Recorded at Kodama Studios, Philippines" (Note: Cover version of the song by Jose Mari Chan)	2019	Spotify Jams: OPM Love Songs	
"A Perfect Christmas - Recorded at OnQ Studios, Manila" (Note: Notes: Cover version of the song by Jose Mari Chan; Performed with Jose Mari Chan, Moira Dela Torre, December Avenue, I Belong to the Zoo, and Julie Anne San Jose) (as part of Tatak Pinoy All-Stars)	2019	Spotify Singles - Holiday	
"Make It with You" (Note: Note: Cover version of the song by Bread; Official soundtrack of Filipino TV series "Make It with You")	2019	Non-album singles	
"Tuloy Na Tuloy Pa Rin Ang Pasko" (Note: Notes: Cover version of the song by the APO Hiking Society; Official Christmas theme song of Robinsons Malls)	2021	Non-album singles	
"Mag-Ingat" (Note: A collaboration with Google, with the song advocating for Internet safety)	2022	Non-album singles	
"The Way You Look At Me" (Note: Cover version of the song by Christian Bautista)	2023	The Way You Look At Me: The Songs of Christian Bautista	
"Autumn" (Note: One of the official soundtracks of Filipino TV series "Can't Buy Me Love") (with Belle Mariano)	2023	And Solemn	
"Nais" (Note: Cover version of the song by Erik Santos) (with Jonathan Manalo)	2024	Non-album single	
"Salbabida" (Note: Cover version of the song by Kyla, composed by Jungee Marcelo)	2024	Jungee Marcelo Anniverseries	
"Kathang Isip" (Note: One of the official soundtracks of the Filipino adaptation of the Korean series "It's Okay to Not Be Okay".) (with Angela Ken)	2025	It's Okay to Not Be Okay (Official Soundtrack)	

=== Charity singles ===
List of charity singles by Ben&Ben
Title	Year	Album	Ref.
"Forever Beautiful (All for One Version)" (Note: Notes: Cover version of the song by Eric Chou; Performed with Chou himself, as well as Kelly Cheng, Wafa, NYK, Benjamin Kheng, Narelle Kheng, Sezairi Sezali, Hà Lê, E.Viewz, Fatin Shidqia, Jocelyn C, Phil Lam, Jason Chan, and Cath Wong) (as part of Han Hong Love Charity Foundation's COVID-19 pandemic relief effort)	2020	Non-album singles	
"Sa Kapwa Ko Ay Alay" (as part of "50th Year of Alay Kapwa" initiatives of Caritas Philippines)	2025	Non-album singles	

== Music videos ==
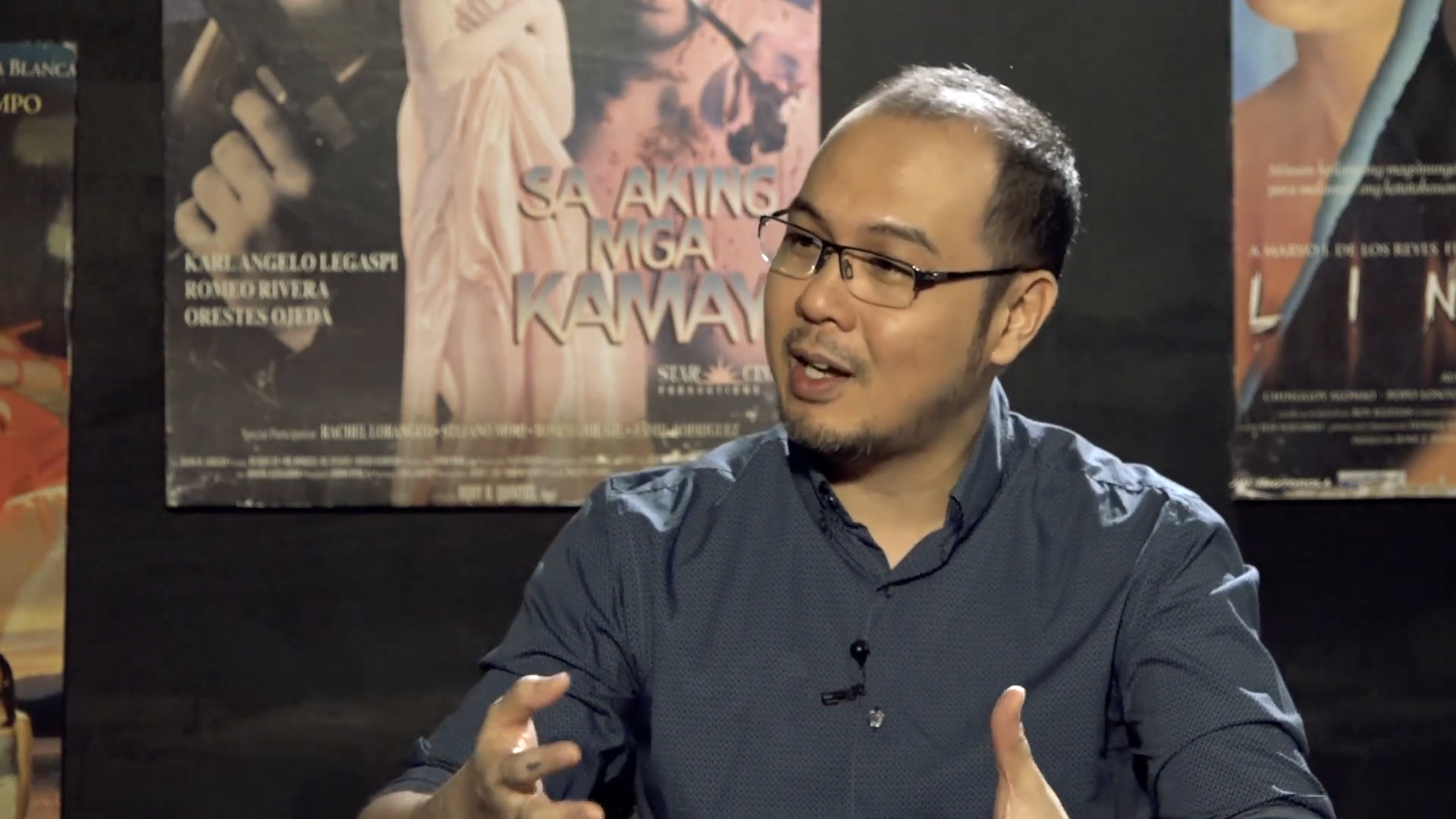
Jerrold Tarog, who made the film Goyo: The Boy General (2018), directed the music video for "Susi", a song featured in his film. He later also directed the music video for another Ben&Ben song, "Lunod".

List of music videos released by Ben&Ben
Title	Year	Director(s)	Ref.
As lead artist
"Tinatangi" (with Cooky Chua and Bayang Barrios)	2016	Rey Gibraltar	
"Ride Home"	2017	Lorraine Sandel	
"Leaves"	2017	Alvin Tatco	
"Kathang Isip"	2017	Ria Red	
"Maybe the Night"	2018	Ria Red	
"Susi"	2018	Jerrold Tarog	
"Pagtingin"	2019	Jorel Lising	
"Araw-Araw"	2019	Quark Henares	
"Make It with You"	2020	Miko Pelino	
"Fall"	2020	Raymond Dacones; Trina Razon	
"Masyado Pang Maaga"	2020	Jorel Lising	
"War"	2020	—N/a	
"Nakikinig Ka Ba Sa Akin"	2020	Jorel Lising	
"Lifetime"	2020	Raymond Dacones; Trina Razon	
"Di Ka Sayang"	2020	Jorel Lising	
"Sa Susunod Na Habang Buhay"	2020	Jorel Lising	
"Magpahinga"	2021	Jorel Lising	
"Leaves" (with Young K)	2021	Jorel Lising	
"Pasalubong" (with Moira Dela Torre)	2021	Niq Ablao	
"Sugat" (with Munimuni)	2021	Tey Clamor; Keifer Cabugao	
"Upuan"	2021	Niq Ablao	
"Lunod" (with Zild and Juan Karlos)	2021	Jerrold Tarog	
"Kayumanggi" (Note: A collaboration with the National Geographic Society, with the music video advocating for the welfare of the La Union communities)	2021	Judd Figuerres	
"Mag-Ingat"	2022	Bea Charlyn Laiño	
"Inevitable"	2022	Jorel Lising	
"Kapangyarihan" (with SB19)	2022	Dexter Santos	
"Paninindigan Kita"	2022	Niq Ablao	
"The Ones We Once Loved"	2022	Niq Ablao	
"Could Be Something"	2023	ER Alviz	
"Courage"	2023	Jorel Lising	
"Autumn" (with Belle Mariano)	2024	Riel Mandapat	
"Triumph"	2024	Puppeteer Studios (Note: Animation music video were made by Puppeteer Studios)	
"New Dimensions"	2024	Puppeteer Studios	
"Heaven" (with Tilly Birds)	2025	MV Isip	
"Duyan"	2026	Raliug	
As featured artist
"Forever Beautiful (All for One Version)"	2020	—N/a	
"Paalam" (with Moira Dela Torre)	2020	Niq Ablao	
"Mapa (Band Version)" (with SB19)	2021	—N/a	
"Cheap Love" (with WeiBird)	2021	Birdy Nio	

== Usages as soundtracks ==
List of media in which Ben&Ben's songs have been used
Year	Film/series	Song(s)	Ref.
2018	Nakalimutan Ko Nang Kalimutan Ka	"Kathang Isip"	
2018	Goyo: The Boy General	"Susi"	
2018	Exes Baggage	"Maybe The Night"	
2018	The Write Moment	"Kathang Isip"	
2018	Coke Studio Homecoming	"Balik-Balikan"	
2018	Coke Studio Homecoming	"Dati"	
2019	Cara x Jagger	"Leaves"	
2019	LSS (Note: In addition, members of Ben&Ben also starred in the film)	"Mitsa (Salamat)"	
2019	LSS	"Araw-Araw"	
2019	LSS	"Pagtingin"	
2019	LSS	"Ride Home" (Note: Also used in the film's teaser trailer)	
2019	LSS	"Bibingka"	
2019	LSS	"Kathang Isip"	
2019	LSS	"Leaves"	
2019	LSS	"Branches"	
2019	LSS	"Fall"	
2019	LSS	"Maybe the Night"	
2019	LSS	"Sunrise"	
2019	Coke Studio Philippines (season 3)	"Di Na Muli"	
2020	Make It with You	"Make It with You" (Note: Used as the series' theme song)	
2020	Gaya Sa Pelikula (episode 6: "A Baring of Souls")	"Ride Home"	
2020	Dito at Doon	"Nakikinig Ka Ba Sa Akin"	
2021	One True Pair The Movie	"Pasalubong"	
2023	Maria Clara at Ibarra	"Kayumanggi" (Note: As admirers of the series, Ben&Ben allowed the film's crew to use the song free of licensing fee)	
2023	Can't Buy Me Love	"Autumn" with Belle Mariano	
2023	Love You Long Time	"Sa Susunod na Habang Buhay" (Note: Also used in a promotional music video of Love You Long Time by production company Studio Sixty Three PH)	
2024	Rewind	"Sa Susunod na Habang Buhay"	
2024	Pulang Araw	"Kapangyarihan" with SB19	
2025	Pinoy Big Brother: Celebrity Collab Edition	"Saranggola"	
2025	It's Okay to Not Be Okay	"Kathang Isip" with Angela Ken	

== See also ==
- List of Philippine-based music groups
- Pinoy pop
- Pinoy rock
