= List of awards and nominations received by Ben&Ben =

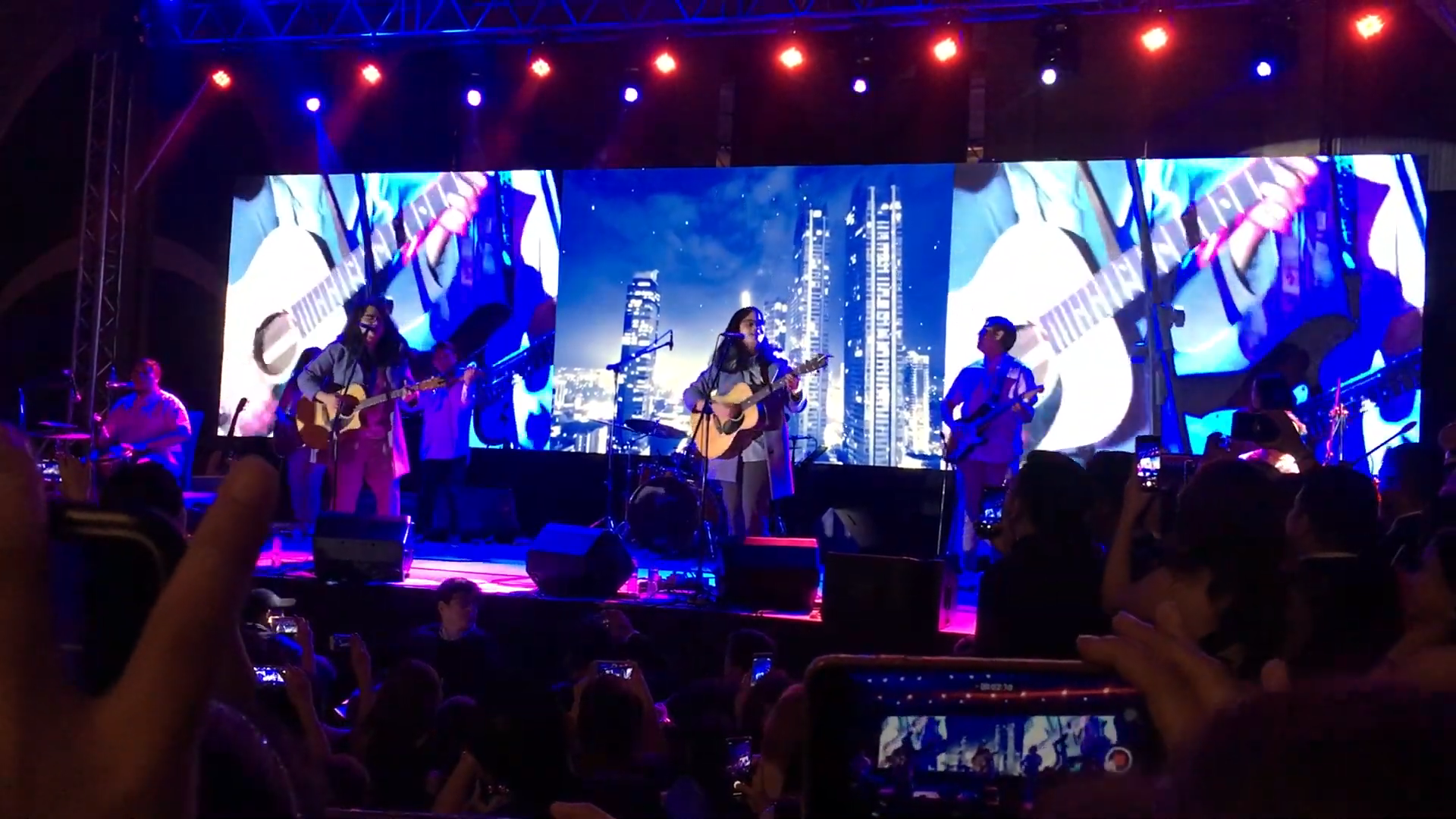
Ben&Ben performing in 2018

Filipino indie folk band Ben&Ben have received numerous awards and nominations for their contributions to music. They were formed in 2016 as the Benjamins, composed of twin brothers Paolo and Miguel Benjamin Guico. At the Philippine Popular Music Festival songwriting competition, the duo debuted the single "Tinatangi", which won third place. They then changed their name and released a self titled extended play (EP). The following year, they expanded into a nine-member ensemble, adding Poch Barretto (electric guitar), Jam Villanueva (drums), Agnes Reoma (bass guitar), Patricia Lasaten (keyboards), Toni Muñoz (percussion), Andrew de Pano (percussion), and Keifer Cabugao (violins). At the 2018 Aliw Awards, Ben&Ben were named Best New Artist – Group, while the EP's singles "Leaves" and "Susi" received nominations at the Awit Awards.

The band released their debut studio album Limasawa Street (2019), which was nominated for Album of the Year at the Awit Awards and the Star Awards for Music. It included the singles "Araw-Araw" and "Pagtingin"; the latter won the Awit Award for Best Performance by a Group Recording Artist and the former received a Star Award for Movies and a Pista ng Pelikulang Pilipino Award as the soundtrack of the romance film Last Song Syndrome (2019). At the 2020 MTV Europe Music Awards, they were nominated for Best Southeast Asian Act. In 2021, the standalone single "Sa Susunod na Habang Buhay" garnered four nominations at the Awit Awards, winning Best Pop Recording. It was nominated for two Myx Music Awards, with its music video receiving the award for Mellow Video of the Year.

With their second studio album Pebble House, Vol. 1: Kuwaderno, the band received 21 Awit Award nominations and won four, including Album of the Year. The single "Lunod" was nominated in four categories, winning Best Music Video, while "Sabel" garnered two nominations and won Best World Recording. Five other songs from the album were also nominated. In 2022, Ben&Ben received an NME Award for Best Band in Asia and was nominated for Best Album by an Asian Artist. The standalone single "Paninindigan Kita" received six Awit Award nominations, earning Ben&Ben their second win for Best Performance by a Group Recording Artist. It was also named Best Pop Recording and Music Video of the Year at the ceremony. In 2023, the band was recognized with a Best Choice Award – Music at the Asia Artist Awards. Ben&Ben's music has surpassed more than two billion streams to date, and they were named the most-streamed Filipino artist of all time by Spotify.

== Awards and nominations ==
Awards and nominations received by Ben&Ben
| Award | Year (Note: Indicates the year of ceremony. Each year is linked to the article about the awards held that year, wherever possible.) | Recipient(s) and nominee(s) | Category | Result | Ref(s) |
|---|---|---|---|---|---|
| Aliw Awards | 2018 | Ben&Ben | Best New Artist – Group | Won | |
| Asia Artist Awards | 2023 | Ben&Ben | Best Choice Award – Music | Won | |
| Awit Awards | 2018 | "Maybe the Night" | Best Performance by a Group Recording Artist | Nominated | |
| Awit Awards | 2018 | "Maybe the Night" | Best World Music Recording | Nominated | |
| Awit Awards | 2018 | "Leaves" | Best Inspirational Recording | Nominated | |
| Awit Awards | 2019 | "Branches" | Best Folk Recording | Won | |
| Awit Awards | 2019 | "Susi" | Best Song Written for Movie/TV/Stage Play | Nominated | |
| Awit Awards | 2020 | Limasawa Street | Album of the Year | Nominated | |
| Awit Awards | 2020 | Limasawa Street | People's Choice for Favorite Album | Won | |
| Awit Awards | 2020 | "Pagtingin" | Best Performance by a Group Recording Artist | Won | |
| Awit Awards | 2020 | "Pagtingin" | Song of the Year | Nominated | |
| Awit Awards | 2020 | "Pagtingin" | People's Choice for Favorite Song | Won | |
| Awit Awards | 2020 | "Paalam" (with Moira Dela Torre) | Record of the Year | Nominated | |
| Awit Awards | 2020 | "Paalam" (with Moira Dela Torre) | Best Collaboration | Nominated | |
| Awit Awards | 2021 | Ben&Ben | Most Streamed Artist | Won | |
| Awit Awards | 2021 | Ben&Ben | People's Choice for Favorite Group Artist | Nominated | |
| Awit Awards | 2021 | "Di Ka Sayang" | Song of the Year | Nominated | |
| Awit Awards | 2021 | "Di Ka Sayang" | Record of the Year | Won | |
| Awit Awards | 2021 | "Di Ka Sayang" | Best Performance by a Group Recording Artist | Nominated | |
| Awit Awards | 2021 | "Di Ka Sayang" | Best Inspirational Recording | Won | |
| Awit Awards | 2021 | "Di Ka Sayang" | People's Choice for Favorite Song | Nominated | |
| Awit Awards | 2021 | "Doors" | Best Performance by a Group Recording Artist | Nominated | |
| Awit Awards | 2021 | "Doors" | Best Global Recording | Nominated | |
| Awit Awards | 2021 | "Lifetime" | Song of the Year | Nominated | |
| Awit Awards | 2021 | "Lifetime" | People's Choice for Favorite Song | Nominated | |
| Awit Awards | 2021 | "Sa Susunod na Habang Buhay" | Best Ballad Recording | Won | |
| Awit Awards | 2021 | "Sa Susunod na Habang Buhay" | Best Traditional/Contemporary Folk Recording | Nominated | |
| Awit Awards | 2021 | "Sa Susunod na Habang Buhay" | People's Choice for Favorite Song | Nominated | |
| Awit Awards | 2021 | "Sa Susunod na Habang Buhay" | Best Engineered Recording | Nominated | |
| Awit Awards | 2022 | Ben&Ben | People's Choice for Favorite Group Artist | Nominated | |
| Awit Awards | 2022 | Pebble House, Vol. 1: Kuwaderno | Album of the Year | Won | |
| Awit Awards | 2022 | "Kapangyarihan" (with SB19) | Best Collaboration | Nominated | |
| Awit Awards | 2022 | "Lunod" (with Zild and Juan Karlos) | Best Collaboration | Nominated | |
| Awit Awards | 2022 | "Lunod" (with Zild and Juan Karlos) | Best Rock/Alternative Recording | Nominated | |
| Awit Awards | 2022 | "Lunod" (with Zild and Juan Karlos) | Best Engineered Recording | Nominated | |
| Awit Awards | 2022 | "Lunod" (with Zild and Juan Karlos) | Best Musical Arrangement | Nominated | |
| Awit Awards | 2022 | "Lunod" (with Zild and Juan Karlos) | Best Music Video | Won | |
| Awit Awards | 2022 | "Mapa (Band Version)" (with SB19) | Record of the Year | Nominated | |
| Awit Awards | 2022 | "Pasalubong" (with Moira Dela Torre) | Song of the Year | Nominated | |
| Awit Awards | 2022 | "Pasalubong" (with Moira Dela Torre) | Best Ballad Recording | Nominated | |
| Awit Awards | 2022 | "Pasalubong" (with Moira Dela Torre) | People's Choice for Favorite Song | Nominated | |
| Awit Awards | 2022 | "Sabel" (with KZ Tandingan) | Best World Music Recording | Won | |
| Awit Awards | 2022 | "Sabel" (with KZ Tandingan) | Best Collaboration | Nominated | |
| Awit Awards | 2022 | "Sugat" (with Munimuni) | Best Collaboration | Nominated | |
| Awit Awards | 2022 | "Sugat" (with Munimuni) | Best Traditional/Contemporary Folk Recording | Nominated | |
| Awit Awards | 2022 | "Swimming Pool" (with Chito Miranda) | Best Rock/Alternative Recording | Nominated | |
| Awit Awards | 2022 | "Tuloy Na Tuloy Pa Rin Ang Pasko" | Best Christmas Recording | Nominated | |
| Awit Awards | 2022 | "Upuan" | Best Performance by a Group Recording Artist | Nominated | |
| Awit Awards | 2022 | "Upuan" | Best Musical Arrangement | Won | |
| Awit Awards | 2022 | "Upuan" | People's Choice for Favorite Song | Nominated | |
| Awit Awards | 2023 | Ben&Ben | People's Choice for Favorite Group Artist | Nominated | |
| Awit Awards | 2023 | "Dear" | Best Alternative Recording | Nominated | |
| Awit Awards | 2023 | "Langyang Pag-ibig" | Best Musical Arrangement | Nominated | |
| Awit Awards | 2023 | "Langyang Pag-ibig" | Best Engineered Recording | Nominated | |
| Awit Awards | 2023 | "Langyang Pag-ibig" | Best Cover Art | Nominated | |
| Awit Awards | 2023 | "The Ones We Once Loved" | Song of the Year | Nominated | |
| Awit Awards | 2023 | "Paninindigan Kita" | Song of the Year | Nominated | |
| Awit Awards | 2023 | "Paninindigan Kita" | Best Performance by a Group Recording Artist | Won (Note: Tied with Dilaw for "Uhaw"') | |
| Awit Awards | 2023 | "Paninindigan Kita" | Best Pop Recording | Won | |
| Awit Awards | 2023 | "Paninindigan Kita" | Best Traditional/Contemporary Folk Recording | Nominated | |
| Awit Awards | 2023 | "Paninindigan Kita" | Music Video of the Year | Won | |
| Awit Awards | 2023 | "Paninindigan Kita" | People's Choice for Favorite Song | Nominated | |
| Awit Awards | 2024 | "Courage (Full Band Ver.)" | Best Traditional/Contemporary Folk Recording | Pending | |
| Awit Awards | 2024 | "Courage (Full Band Ver.)" | Best Inspirational Recording | Pending | |
| Awit Awards | 2024 | "Autumn" | Best Remix Recording | Pending | |
| EDDY Awards | 2019 | "Maybe the Night" | Best Original Theme Song | Won | |
| EDDY Awards | 2019 | "Susi" | Best Original Theme Song | Nominated | |
| FAMAS Awards | 2022 | "Nakikinig Ka Ba Sa Akin" | Best Original Song | Nominated | |
| MOR Pinoy Music Awards | 2019 | Ben&Ben | Band of the Year | Won | |
| MOR Pinoy Music Awards | 2019 | Ben&Ben | Digital Artist of the Year | Nominated | |
| MTV Europe Music Awards | 2020 | Ben&Ben | Best Southeast Asian Act | Nominated | |
| Myx Music Awards | 2019 | "Kathang Isip" | Song of the Year | Nominated | |
| Myx Music Awards | 2019 | Ben&Ben | Group of the Year | Nominated | |
| Myx Music Awards | 2019 | "Maybe the Night" | Media Soundtrack of the Year | Nominated | |
| Myx Music Awards | 2020 | Ben&Ben | Artist of the Year | Nominated | |
| Myx Music Awards | 2020 | "Pagtingin" | Song of the Year | Nominated | |
| Myx Music Awards | 2020 | "Pagtingin" | Mellow Video of the Year | Nominated | |
| Myx Music Awards | 2021 | Ben&Ben | Artist of the Year | Nominated | |
| Myx Music Awards | 2021 | "Lifetime" | Song of the Year | Nominated | |
| Myx Music Awards | 2021 | "Paalam" (with Moira Dela Torre) | Collaboration of the Year | Won | |
| Myx Music Awards | 2021 | "Sa Susunod na Habang Buhay" | Music Video of the Year | Nominated | |
| Myx Music Awards | 2021 | "Sa Susunod na Habang Buhay" | Mellow Video of the Year | Won | |
| New Hue Video Music Awards | 2025 | Agnes Reoma | Bassist of the Year | Won | |
| NME Awards | 2022 | Ben&Ben | Best Band in the World | Nominated | |
| NME Awards | 2022 | Ben&Ben | Best Band in Asia | Won | |
| NME Awards | 2022 | Pebble House, Vol. 1: Kuwaderno | Best Album by an Asian Artist | Nominated | |
| Pista ng Pelikulang Pilipino | 2019 | "Araw-Araw" | Best Original Song | Won | |
| Philippine Popular Music Festival | 2016 | "Tinatangi" (Note: Paolo and Miguel Guico were credited as The Benjamins for the release of "Tinatangi".) | Best Song | Runner-up | |
| Philippine Popular Music Festival | 2016 | "Tinatangi" | Best Music Video | Won | |
| Star Awards for Movies | 2021 | "Araw-Araw" | Movie Theme Song of the Year | Won | |
| Star Awards for Music | 2019 | "Branches" | Folk/Country Recording of the Year | Nominated | |
| Star Awards for Music | 2021 | Ben&Ben | Duo/Group Artist of the Year | Won | |
| Star Awards for Music | 2021 | Limasawa Street | Album of the Year | Nominated | |
| Star Awards for Music | 2021 | "Pagtingin" | Song of the Year | Nominated | |
| Star Awards for Music | 2021 | "Sampaguita" | Folk/Country Recording of the Year | Nominated | |
| Star Awards for Music | 2022 | Ben&Ben | Duo/Group Artist of the Year | Won | |
| Star Awards for Music | 2022 | "Di Ka Sayang" | Song of the Year | Nominated | |
| Star Awards for Music | 2022 | "A Trilogy Patawad Paalam, Paalam and Patawad" (with Moira Dela Torre and I Belong to the Zoo) | Music Video of the Year | Nominated | |
| Star Awards for Music | 2023 | Pebble House, Vol. 1: Kuwaderno | Album of the Year | Nominated | |
| Star Awards for Music | 2023 | Ben&Ben | Duo/Group Artist of the Year | Nominated | |
| Star Awards for Music | 2023 | Ben&Ben Live! | Duo/Group Concert of the Year | Nominated | |
| Star Awards for Music | 2023 | "Pasalubong" (with Moira Dela Torre) | Folk/Country Recording of the Year | Nominated | |
| Star Awards for Music | 2023 | "Lunod" (with Zild and Juan Karlos) | Collaboration of the Year | Nominated | |
| Star Awards for Music | 2024 | Ben&Ben | Duo/Group Artist of the Year | Won | |
| Star Awards for Music | 2024 | "Paninindigan Kita" | Song of the Year | Nominated | |
| Star Awards for Music | 2024 | Ben&Ben Homecoming Concert | Duo/Group Concert of the Year | Nominated | |
| Wish 107.5 Music Awards | 2018 | Ben&Ben | Group/Duo of the Year | Won | |
| Wish 107.5 Music Awards | 2018 | "Leaves" | Contemporary Folk Song of the Year | Won | |
| Wish 107.5 Music Awards | 2018 | "Ride Home" | Contemporary Folk Performance of the Year | Nominated | |
| Wish 107.5 Music Awards | 2019 | "Maybe the Night" | Contemporary Folk Performance of the Year | Won | |
| Wish 107.5 Music Awards | 2019 | "Sunrise" | Contemporary Folk Song of the Year | Won | |
| Wish 107.5 Music Awards | 2019 | Ben&Ben | Group of the Year | Nominated | |
| Wish 107.5 Music Awards | 2020 | Ben&Ben | Group of the Year | Won | |
| Wish 107.5 Music Awards | 2020 | "Mitsa" | Contemporary Folk Performance of the Year | Nominated | |
| Wish 107.5 Music Awards | 2020 | "Pagtingin" | Urban Performance of the Year | Won | |
| Wish 107.5 Music Awards | 2021 | Ben&Ben | Group of the Year | Nominated | |
| Wish 107.5 Music Awards | 2021 | "Araw-Araw" | Contemporary Folk Performance of the Year | Won | |
| Wish 107.5 Music Awards | 2021 | "Lifetime" | Contemporary Folk Song of the Year | Won | |
| Wish 107.5 Music Awards | 2022 | Ben&Ben | Group of the Year | Nominated | |
| Wish 107.5 Music Awards | 2022 | "Sa Susunod na Habang Buhay" | Contemporary Folk Performance of the Year | Won | |
| Wish 107.5 Music Awards | 2022 | "Upuan" | Contemporary Folk Song of the Year | Nominated | |
| Wish 107.5 Music Awards | 2022 | "Lunod" (with Zild and Juan Karlos) | Song Collaboration of the Year | Won | |
| Wish 107.5 Music Awards | 2022 | "Sugat" (with Munimuni) | Song Collaboration of the Year | Nominated | |
| Wish 107.5 Music Awards | 2023 | Ben&Ben | Group of the Year | Nominated | |
| Wish 107.5 Music Awards | 2023 | "Magpahinga" | Ballad Performance of the Year | Won | |
| Wish 107.5 Music Awards | 2023 | "The Ones We Once Loved" | Ballad Song of the Year | Nominated | |
| Wish 107.5 Music Awards | 2023 | "Paninindigan Kita" | Contemporary Folk Song of the Year | Won | |
| Wish 107.5 Music Awards | 2024 | "Could Be Something" | Contemporary R&B Song of the Year | Nominated | |
