= List of songs recorded by Ben&Ben =

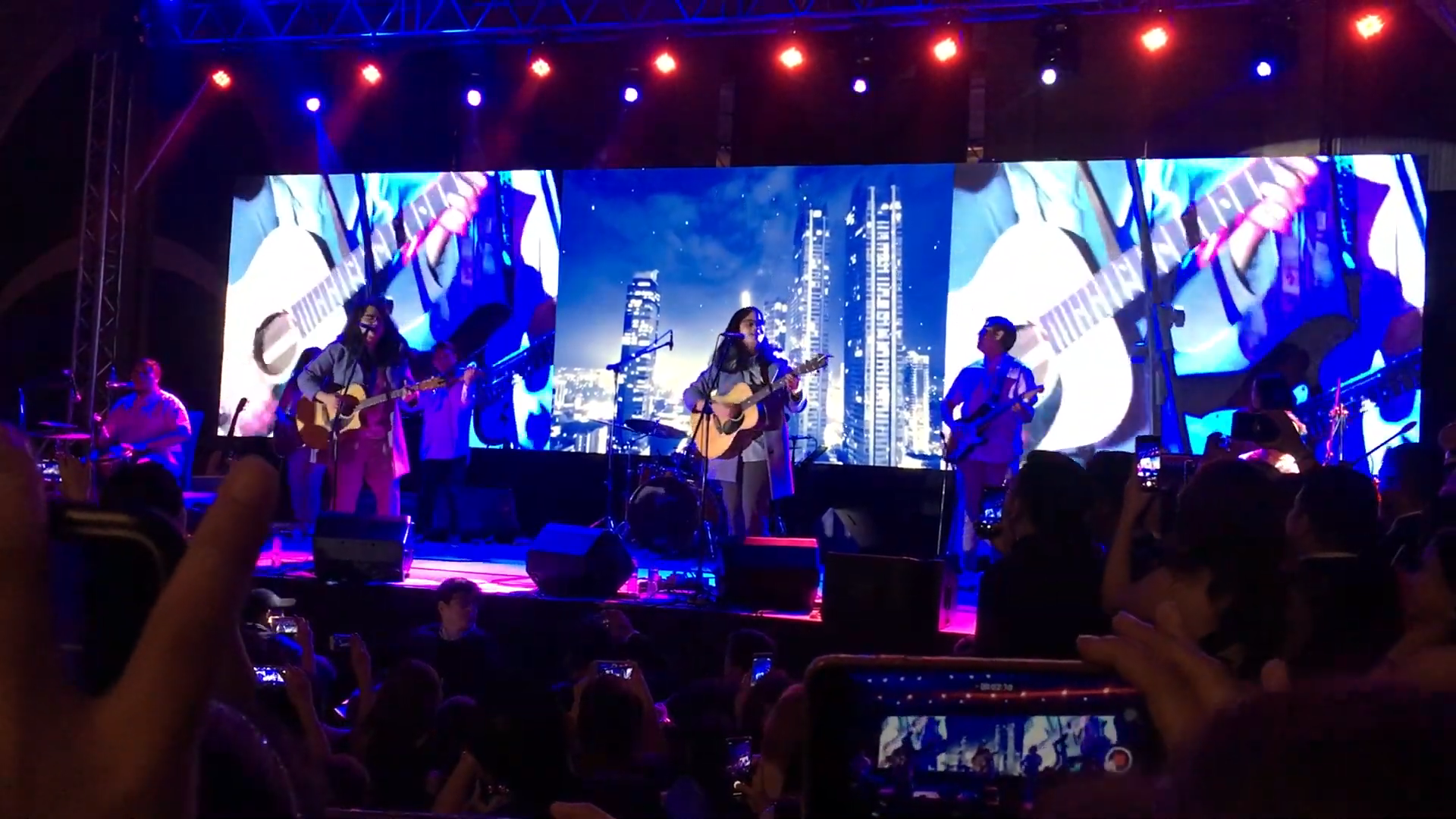
Ben&Ben performing in 2018

Filipino indie folk band Ben&Ben have recorded and written material for two studio albums and one extended play (EP). They have collaborated with other artists and featured on songs on their respective albums. The band formed in 2016 as the Benjamins, composed of Paolo and Miguel Benjamin Guico. The duo debuted "Tinatangi" as part of the Philippine Popular Music Festival songwriting competition. They then changed their name and released their self-titled EP consisting of seven songs. In 2017, they expanded into a nine-member ensemble, adding Poch Barretto as electric guitarist, Jam Villanueva as drummer, Agnes Reoma as bassist, Patricia Lasaten as keyboardist, Toni Muñoz and Andrew de Pano as percussionists, as well as Keifer Cabugao as violinist, with the Guicos being acoustic guitarists. In 2018, two singles from the EP were featured in film soundtracks: "Susi" for the biopic Goyo: Ang Batang Heneral and "Maybe the Night" for the romantic drama Exes Baggage; they also co-wrote "Balik-Balikan" with Sam Concepcion for the television series Coke Studio Homecoming.

With producer Jean Paul Verona, Ben&Ben debuted the double lead singles "Araw-Araw" and "Pagtingin", before releasing their first studio album, Limasawa Street (2019). It blended indie folk, pop, and world music genres, and embraced themes of romance and positivity. They collaborated on the title track with British producer Steve Lillywhite, known for his work with rock band U2. In the same year, ten songs taken from their EP and debut album were curated for the soundtrack of the romance film LSS (Last Song Syndrome) (2019). Their second studio album, Pebble House, Vol. 1: Kuwaderno (2021), marked a move towards sociopolitical themes reflected in lyrics that deal with social justice, mental health, and individualism. The band members co-wrote some of the songs on the album, with all of them receiving producing credits. It emphasized a more diversified style, exploring minimalist sound, elements of hand-clapping, and incorporating melodic chants, as well as rock opera-inspired music.

Ben&Ben have collaborated and co-written material with other artists, including Moira Dela Torre, SB19, and Harv. They have also covered a variety of popular songs such as "Make It with You" by Bread, "The Way You Look at Me" by Christian Bautista, "Tuloy Na Tuloy Pa Rin ang Pasko" by the APO Hiking Society, and "Beautiful Girl" and "A Perfect Christmas" by Jose Mari Chan. The single "Sa Susunod na Habang Buhay" became the main theme of two films in 2023—Love You Long Time and Rewind. A musical adaptation of the 2007 drama One More Chance will feature Ben&Ben's discography and premiered in April 2024.

== Songs ==
Key
†	Indicates single release
#	Indicates promotional single release

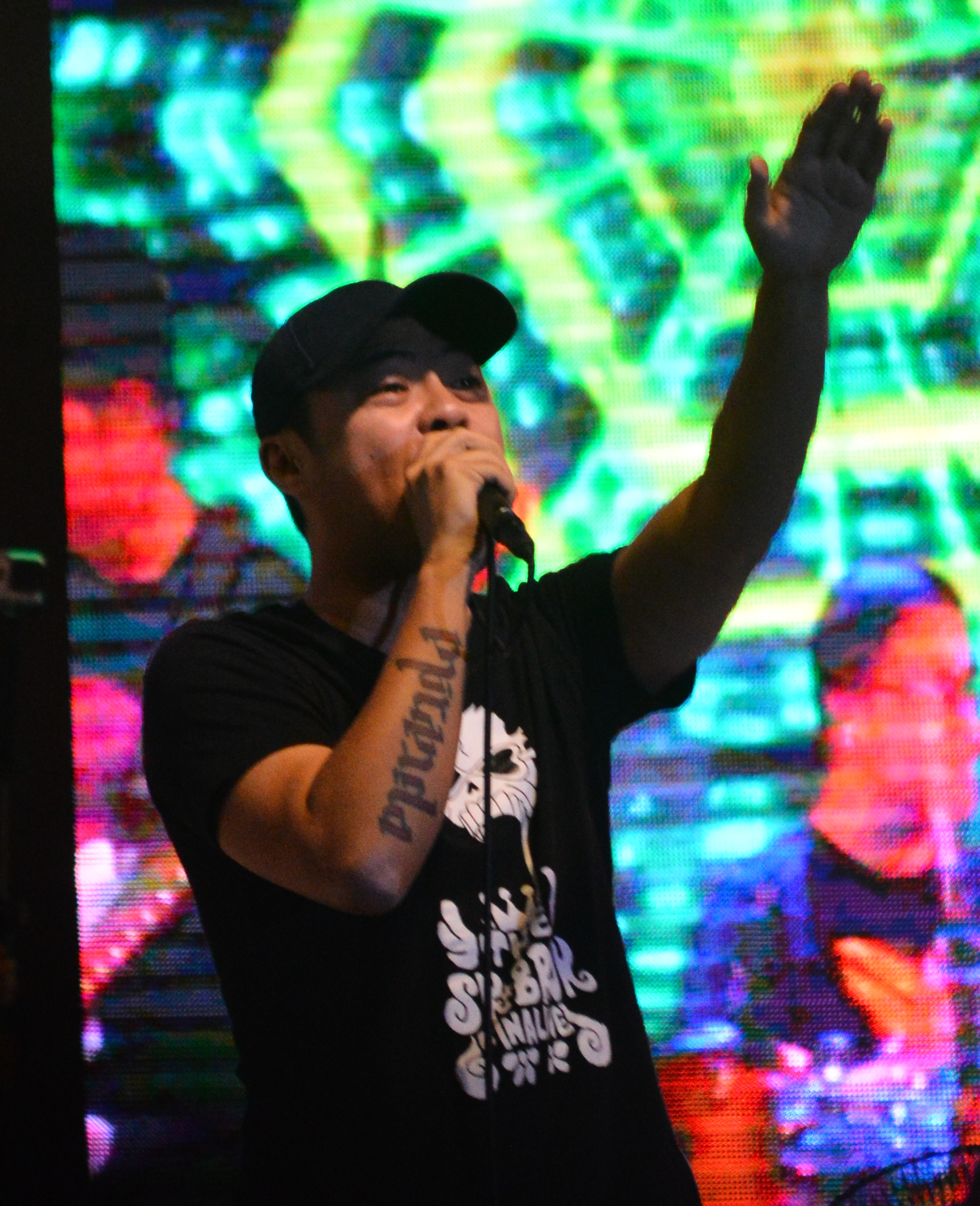
Parokya ni Edgar lead singer Chito Miranda and Ben&Ben collaborated on "Swimming Pool".

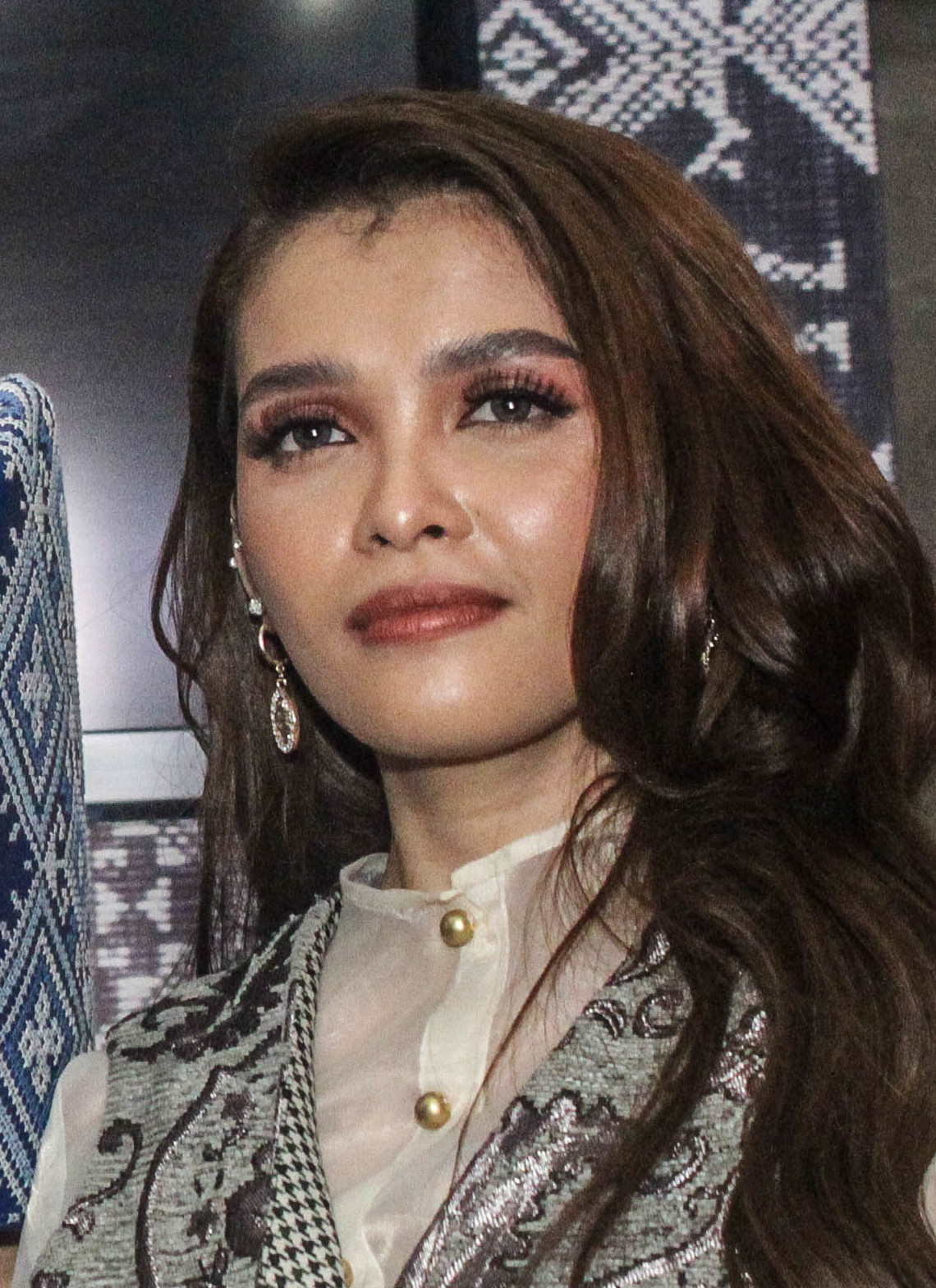
KZ Tandingan is featured on the single "Sabel".

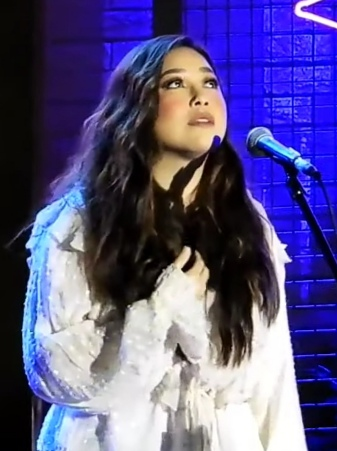
Moira Dela Torre co-wrote "Paalam" and "Pasalubong".

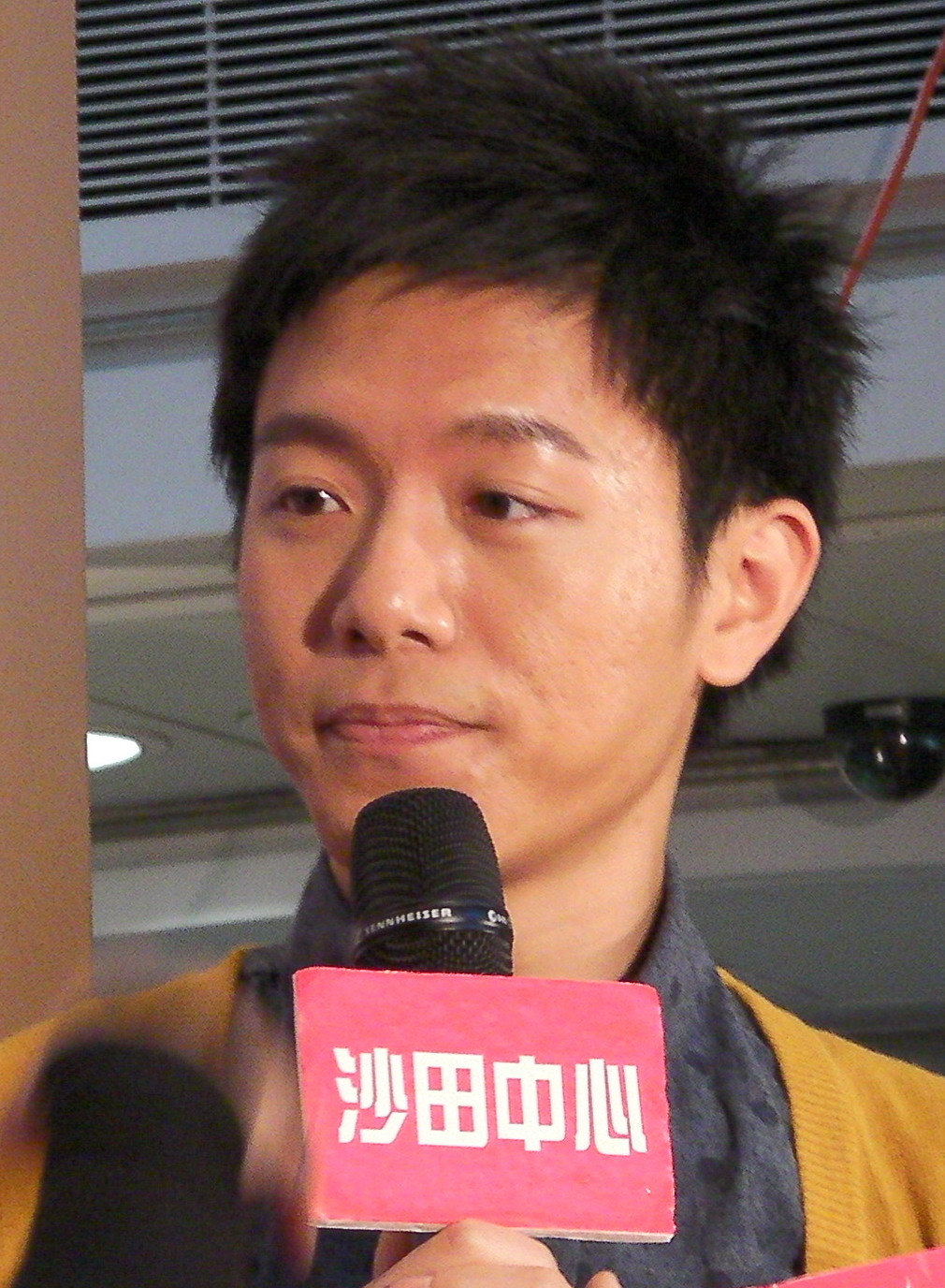
Ben&Ben is featured on WeiBird's song "Cheap Love".

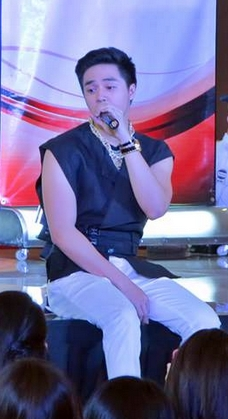
Sam Concepcion and Ben&Ben wrote the single "Balik-Balikan".

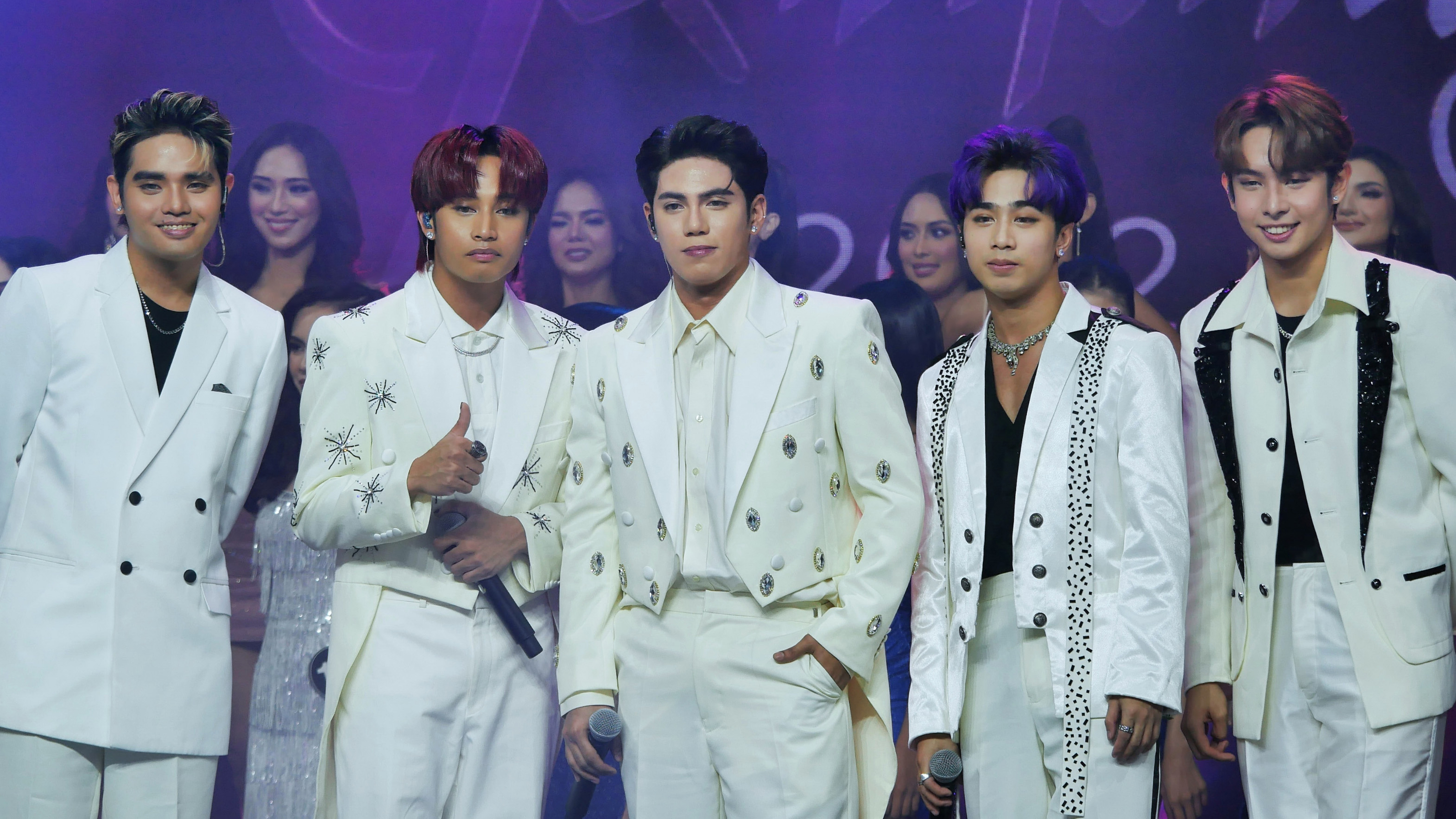
SB19 and Ben&Ben collaborated on "Mapa (Band Version)" and "Kapangyarihan".

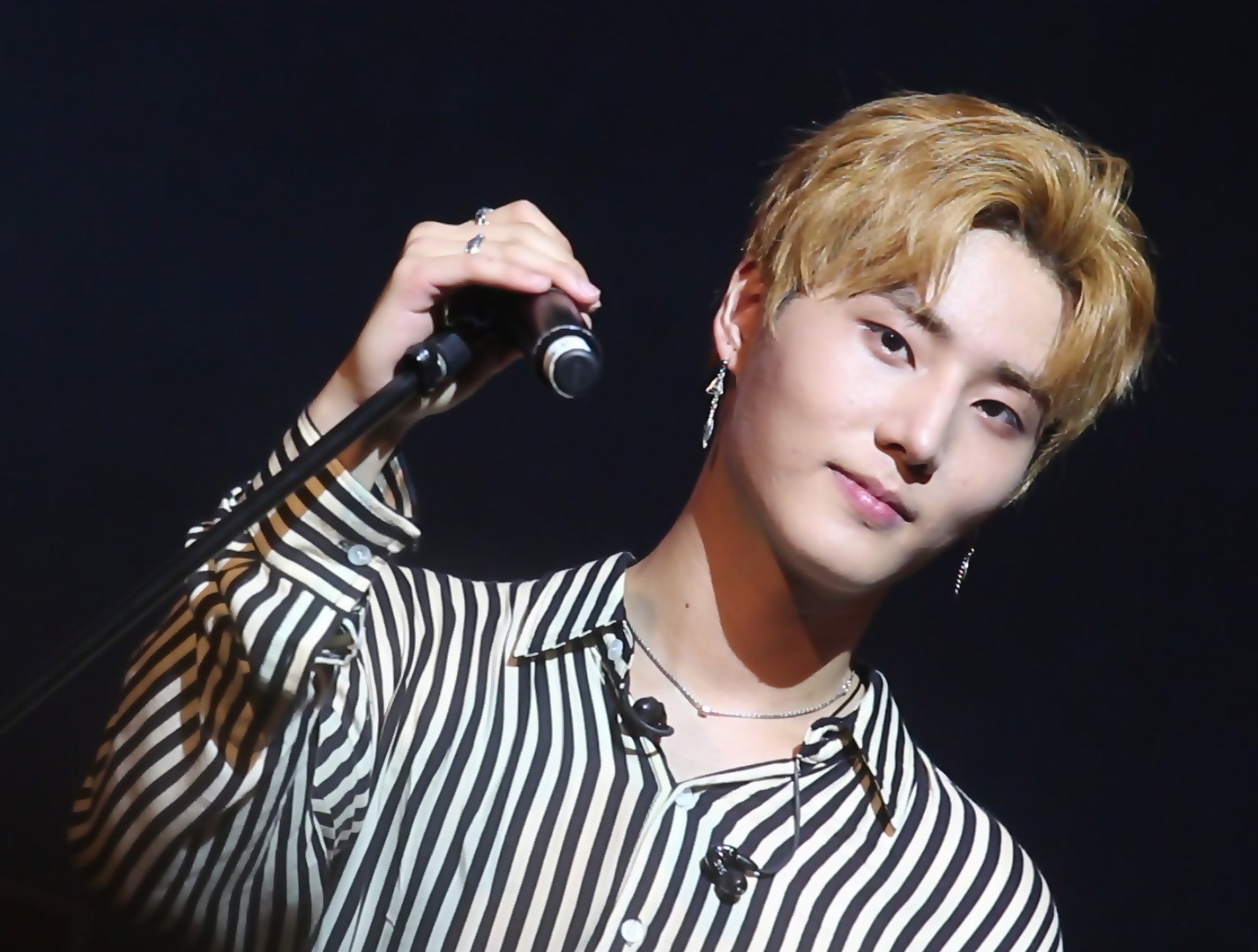
Young K and Ben&Ben released a re-recorded version of "Leaves" in 2021.

Name of song, credited artist(s), writer(s), originating album, and year of release
Song	Artist(s)	Writer(s)	Album	Year	Ref.
"Araw-Araw" †	Ben&Ben	Miguel Guico; Paolo Guico	Limasawa Street	2019	
"Autumn" † (Note: Ben&Ben and Belle Mariano re-recorded and released "Autumn" as a duet in 2023.)	Ben&Ben	Miguel Guico; Paolo Guico	None (Note: "Autumn" was released as a non-album single in 2023.)	2023	
"Baka Sakali"	Ben&Ben (featuring Ebe Dancel)	Miguel Guico; Paolo Guico	Limasawa Street	2019	
"Balik-Balikan" #	Ben&Ben (with Sam Concepcion)	Miguel Guico; Paolo Guico; Sam Concepcion	None (Note: "Balik-Balikan" was released as a non-album promotional single in 2018.)	2018	
"Beautiful Girl" #	Ben&Ben	Jose Mari Chan	Spotify Jams: OPM Love Songs	2019	
"Bibingka" # (Note: "Bibingka" was released as part of a compilation album by Stages Sessions titled Pintig ng Pasko.)	Ben&Ben	Miguel Guico; Paolo Guico	Pintig ng Pasko	2016	
"Branches" †	Ben&Ben	Miguel Guico; Paolo Guico	None (Note: "Branches" was released as a non-album single in 2018.)	2018	
"Cheap Love" †	WeiBird (featuring Ben&Ben)	William Wei	None (Note: "Cheap Love" was released as a non-album single in 2021.)	2021	
"Could Be Something" †	Ben&Ben	Miguel Guico; Paolo Guico	None (Note: "Could Be Something" was released as a non-album single in 2023.)	2023	
"Courage" † (Note: Ben&Ben released the single as "Courage" (Acoustic Version) in 2023 and later recorded a full band version.)	Ben&Ben	Miguel Guico; Paolo Guico	None (Note: "Courage" was released as a non-album single in 2023.)	2023	
"Dahilan"	Ben&Ben	Miguel Guico; Paolo Guico	Ben&Ben	2016	
"Dati" #	Ben&Ben	Thyro Alfaro; Yumi Lacsamana	None (Note: "Dati" was released as a non-album promotional single in 2018.)	2018	
"Dear" †	Ben&Ben	Miguel Guico; Paolo Guico	None (Note: "Dear" was released as a non-album single in 2022.)	2022	
"Di Ka Sayang" †	Ben&Ben	Miguel Guico; Paolo Guico	None (Note: "Nakikinig Ka Ba sa Akin" was released as a non-album single in 2020.)	2020	
"Di Na Muli" #	Clara Benin and Bea Lorenzo (featuring Ben&Ben)	Jazz Nicolas	None (Note: "Di Na Muli" was released as a non-album promotional single in 2019.)	2019	
"Doors" †	Ben&Ben	Miguel Guico	None (Note: "Doors" was released as a non-album single in 2020.)	2020	
"Elyu"	Ben&Ben	Miguel Guico; Paolo Guico	Pebble House, Vol. 1: Kuwaderno	2021	
"Fall"	Ben&Ben	Miguel Guico; Paolo Guico	Limasawa Street	2019	
"Godsent"	Ben&Ben	Keifer Cabugao	Limasawa Street	2019	
"Hummingbird"	Ben&Ben	Paolo Guico	Limasawa Street	2019	
"Ilang Tulog Na Lang"	Ben&Ben	Paolo Guico; Toni Muñoz	Pebble House, Vol. 1: Kuwaderno	2021	
"Inevitable" †	Ben&Ben	Paolo Guico	None (Note: "Inevitable" was released as a non-album single in 2021.)	2021	
"Kadena"	Ben&Ben	Miguel Guico; Paolo Guico	Ben&Ben	2016	
"Kapangyarihan"	Ben&Ben (featuring SB19)	Miguel Guico; Paolo Guico; John Paulo Nase	Pebble House, Vol. 1: Kuwaderno	2021	
"Kasayaw"	Ben&Ben	Miguel Guico; Paolo Guico	Pebble House, Vol. 1: Kuwaderno	2021	
"Kathang Isip" †	Ben&Ben	Miguel Guico; Paolo Guico	Ben&Ben	2017	
"Kayumanggi" †	Ben&Ben	Miguel Guico; Paolo Guico	Pebble House, Vol. 1: Kuwaderno	2021	
"Kuwaderno"	Ben&Ben	Poch Barretto; Toni Muñoz	Pebble House, Vol. 1: Kuwaderno	2021	
"Langyang Pag-ibig" †	Ben&Ben	Miguel Guico; Paolo Guico	None (Note: "Langyang Pag-ibig" was released as a non-album single in 2022.)	2022	
"Leaves" † (Note: Ben&Ben and Young K recorded "Leaves" as a duet and released it in 2021.)	Ben&Ben	Miguel Guico; Paolo Guico	Ben&Ben	2017	
"Lifetime" †	Ben&Ben	Miguel Guico	None (Note: "Lifetime" was released as a non-album single in 2020.)	2020	
"Limasawa Street" (Steve Lillywhite Mix) †	Ben&Ben	Miguel Guico; Paolo Guico	Limasawa Street	2019	
"Lucena"	Ben&Ben	Paolo Guico	Limasawa Street	2019	
"Lunod" †	Ben&Ben (featuring Zild and Juan Karlos)	Miguel Guico; Paolo Guico	Pebble House, Vol. 1: Kuwaderno	2021	
"Mag-Ingat" †	Ben&Ben	Miguel Guico; Paolo Guico	None (Note: "Inevitable" was released as a non-album single in 2022.)	2022	
"Magpahinga" †	Ben&Ben	Miguel Guico; Paolo Guico	Pebble House, Vol. 1: Kuwaderno	2021	
"Make It with You" †	Ben&Ben	David Gates	None (Note: Ben&Ben recorded "Make It with You" as the main theme song for the 2020 television series of the same name.)	2019	
"Mapa (Band Version)" †	SB19 (featuring Ben&Ben)	John Paulo Nase	None (Note: "Mapa (Band Version)" was released as a non-album single in 2021.)	2021	
"Masyado Pang Maaga" †	Ben&Ben	Miguel Guico; Paolo Guico	None (Note: "Masyado Pang Maaga" was released as a non-album single in 2019.)	2019	
"Maybe the Night" †	Ben&Ben	Miguel Guico; Paolo Guico	None (Note: "Maybe the Night" was released as a non-album single in 2017.)	2017	
"Mitsa (Salamat)" †	Ben&Ben	Miguel Guico; Paolo Guico	Limasawa Street	2018	
"Nakikinig Ka Ba sa Akin" †	Ben&Ben	Miguel Guico; Paolo Guico	None (Note: "Nakikinig Ka Ba sa Akin" was released as a non-album single in 2020.)	2020	
"The Ones We Once Loved" †	Ben&Ben	Paolo Guico	None (Note: "Langyang Pag-ibig" was released as a non-album single in 2022.)	2022	
"Ours" †	Ben&Ben and Harv	Miguel Guico; Paolo Guico; Keifer Cabugao; Bernard Harvey	None (Note: "Ours" was released as a non-album single in 2018.)	2018	
"Paalam" †	Moira Dela Torre (featuring Ben&Ben)	Paolo Guico; Moira Dela Torre; Jason Hernandez	Patawad	2019	
"Pagtingin" †	Ben&Ben	Paolo Guico	Limasawa Street	2019	
"Paninindigan Kita" †	Ben&Ben	Miguel Guico; Paolo Guico	None (Note: "Paninindigan Kita" was released as a non-album single in 2022.)	2022	
"Pasalubong" †	Ben&Ben (featuring Moira Dela Torre)	Miguel Guico; Paolo Guico; Moira Dela Torre; Jason Hernandez	Pebble House, Vol. 1: Kuwaderno	2021	
"A Perfect Christmas" #	Ben&Ben (as part of Tatak Pinoy All-Stars)	Jose Mari Chan	None (Note: "A Perfect Christmas" was released as a non-album promotional single in 2019.)	2019	
"Ride Home" †	Ben&Ben	Miguel Guico; Paolo Guico	Ben&Ben	2016	
"Roots"	Ben&Ben	Paolo Guico	Limasawa Street	2019	
"Sa Susunod na Habang Buhay" †	Ben&Ben	Miguel Guico; Paolo Guico	None (Note: "Sa Susunod na Habang Buhay" was released as a non-album single in 2020, and was later used the main theme song of the 2023 films Love You Long Time and Rewind.)	2020	
"Sabel"	Ben&Ben (featuring KZ Tandingan)	Miguel Guico; Paolo Guico; Toni Muñoz	Pebble House, Vol. 1: Kuwaderno	2021	
"Sampaguita"	Ben&Ben	Miguel Guico; Paolo Guico	Limasawa Street	2019	
"Strange"	Ben&Ben	Miguel Guico; Paolo Guico	Ben&Ben	2016	
"Sugat" †	Ben&Ben (featuring Munimuni)	Paolo Guico; Toni Muñoz	Pebble House, Vol. 1: Kuwaderno	2021	
"Sunrise" †	Ben&Ben	Agnes Reoma; Andrew De Pano; Jam Villanueva; Keifer Cabugao; Miguel Guico; Paolo Guico; Patricia Lasaten; Poch Barretto; Toni Muñoz	None (Note: "Sunrise" was released as a non-album single in 2018.)	2018	
"Susi" †	Ben&Ben	Miguel Guico; Paolo Guico	Ben&Ben	2016	
"Swimming Pool"	Ben&Ben (featuring Chito Miranda)	Miguel Guico; Paolo Guico	Pebble House, Vol. 1: Kuwaderno	2021	
"Talaarawan"	Ben&Ben	Miguel Guico; Paolo Guico; Toni Muñoz	Limasawa Street	2019	
"Tinatangi" # (Note: Paolo and Miguel Guico released the single "Tinatangi" as the Benjamins.)	The Benjamins, Bayang Barrios, and Cookie Chua	Miguel Guico; Paolo Guico	PhilPop 2016	2016	
"Tuloy Na Tuloy Pa Rin ang Pasko" #	Ben&Ben	Andrei Dionisio	None (Note: "Tuloy Na Tuloy Pa Rin ang Pasko" was released as a non-album single in 2021.)	2021	
"Upuan" †	Ben&Ben	Miguel Guico; Paolo Guico	Pebble House, Vol. 1: Kuwaderno	2021	
"War"	Ben&Ben	Keifer Cabugao	Limasawa Street	2019	
"The Way You Look at Me" †	Ben&Ben	Andrew Fromm; Keith Follese	None (Note: "The Way You Look at Me" was released as a non-album single in 2023.)	2023	
