= Sampaguita (disambiguation) =

Sampaguita may refer to:

- Jasminum sambac, a species of jasmine also known as the Arabian jasmine. It is the national flower of the Philippines.

== Music ==
- "Sampaguita" (also known as "La Flor de Manila"), a 19th-century musical composition by Dolores Paterno.
- Sampaguita (singer), a female rock singer from the Philippines.
- Sampaguita, a song from Limasawa Street, the debut album of a Filipino band Ben&Ben.
- Sampaguita, a single of a Filipino band juan karlos featuring Gloc-9.

== Other ==
- Sampaguita Pictures, a now defunct Philippine film production company.
