= Princess and I (soundtrack) =

2012 soundtrack album

Princess and I Soundtrack

Soundtrack album by Christian Bautista, Kathryn Bernardo, Daniel Padilla and Various Artists
- Released: June 15, 2012
- Recorded: 2011–2012
- Genre: P-pop, pop
- Length: 59:23
- Label: Star Music

Princess and I, marketed as Love Songs from Princess and I, is the soundtrack album for the ABS-CBN Philippine drama of the same name. It was released in late June 2012 from Star Music. The soundtrack features songs performed by the series stars Kathryn Bernardo, Daniel Padilla, Khalil Ramos and Enrique Gil.

Princess and I Soundtrack is the third teleserye soundtrack released by Star Records in 2012 after the success of Walang Hanggan and Dahil Sa Pag-ibig.

== Album information ==
The official soundtrack album features the romantic theme songs like "Mula Noon Hanggang Ngayon" sung by Kathryn Bernardo, "Hinahanap-hanap Kita" by Daniel Padilla, "Kung Ako Ba Siya" and "Now We’re Together" by Khalil Ramos, "Tunay Na Ligaya" by Enrique Gil, and the versions of "Nag-iisang Bituin" by Christian Bautista and Angeline Quinto.

No.	Title	Artist(s)	Length
1.	"Nag-Iisang Bituin (main version)"	Christian Bautista	3:54
2.	"Hinahanap-hanap Kita"	Daniel Padilla	4:04
3.	"Kung Ako Ba Siya"	Khalil Ramos	3:30
4.	"Mula Noon Hanggang Ngayon"	Kathryn Bernardo	3:58
5.	"Tunay Na Ligaya"	Enrique Gil	3:37
6.	"Now We're Together"	Khalil Ramos	3:03
7.	"Gusto Kita"	Daniel Padilla, Khalil Ramos and Enrique Gil	3:29
8.	"Nag-Iisang Bituin"	Angeline Quinto	4:07
9.	"Nag-Iisang Bituin (instrumental)"	Christian Bautista	3:54
10.	"Hinahanap-hanap Kita (instrumental)"	Daniel Padilla	4:05
11.	"Kung Ako Ba Siya (instrumental)"	Khalil Ramos	3:30
12.	"Mula Noon Hanggang Ngayon (instrumental)"	Kathryn Bernardo	3:58
13.	"Tunay Na Ligaya (instrumental)"	Enrique Gil	3:37
14.	"Now We're Together (instrumental)"	Khalil Ramos	3:03
15.	"Gusto Kita (instrumental)"	Daniel Padilla, Khalil Ramos and Enrique Gil	3:29
16.	"Nag-Iisang Bituin (instrumental)"	Angeline Quinto	4:05
Total length:			59:23

== Singles ==
"Nagiisang Bituin" was the lead single off the soundtrack and the main theme of the series. The song is sung by Christian Bautista and later by Angeline Quinto. The song is also the first promotional single of the soundtrack.

"Hinahanap Hanap Kita" was the second single from the soundtrack, sung by Daniel Padilla.

"Kung Ako ba Siya?" was the third single from the soundtrack, sung by Khalil Ramos.

== Reception ==
Due to success of the show, the album was also certified Gold according to Star Music.

== See also ==
- Princess and I
- List of programs broadcast by ABS-CBN
- List of telenovelas of ABS-CBN
