= Khalil Ramos =

Filipino singer and actor (born 1996)

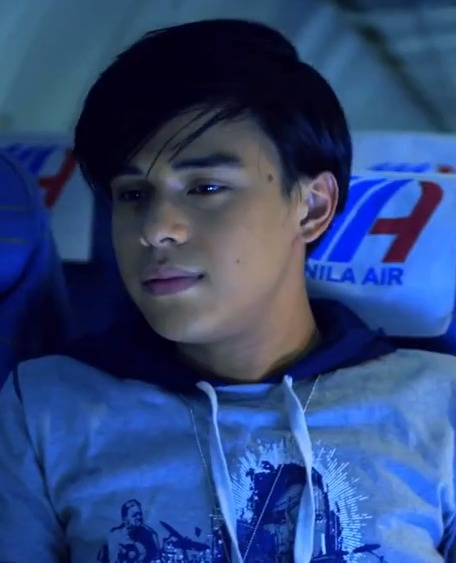
- Ramos in Shake, Rattle & Roll XV (2014)
- Born: Khalil Joseph Nepomuceno Ramos; January 22, 1996 (age 30); Parañaque, Philippines
- Occupations: Singer; actor; dancer; model; musician
- Years active: 2011–present
- Agents: Star Magic (2011–2020); ASAP Artists (2012–2020); Sparkle GMA Artist Center (2020–present)
- Partner: Gabbi Garcia (2017–present)
- Musical career
- Genres: OPM; pop
- Instrument: Vocals
- Years active: 2011–present
- Label: Star Music (2012–2020)
- Website: Khalil Ramos on Instagram

Khalil Joseph Nepomuceno Ramos (Tagalog: [kɐˈlil ˈɾamos]; born January 22, 1996) is a Filipino actor and singer. He is currently an exclusive actor of GMA Network.

In July 2011, Ramos won second place on Pilipinas Got Talent, a reality talent show in ABS-CBN and became a recording artist under Star Magic. In 2012, he was cast in his first teleserye project, Princess and I, top-billing with Kathryn Bernardo, Daniel Padilla and Enrique Gil.

From 2013 to 2016, he appeared in supporting roles in a string of films such as She's Dating the Gangster, Kid Kulafu, A Second Chance, Honor Thy Father and Everything About Her. His first starring role came as Felix Salonga in the 2016 critically acclaimed coming-of-age film 2 Cool 2 Be 4gotten. He has since been cast in recurring roles the drama A Love to Last (2017) and fantasy series La Luna Sangre (2017–18).

He also starred in indie films such as Riding in Tandem opposite Jason Abalos, released in select cinemas in the Philippines on October 13–19, 2017. It was announced that he was cast in thriller drama Kasunduan which also stars Joey Marquez, Joem Bascon and Ejay Falcon, released in 2018.

He transferred to GMA Network's talent agency, Sparkle GMA Artist Center, in 2020 after 9 years with Star Magic.

== Personal life ==
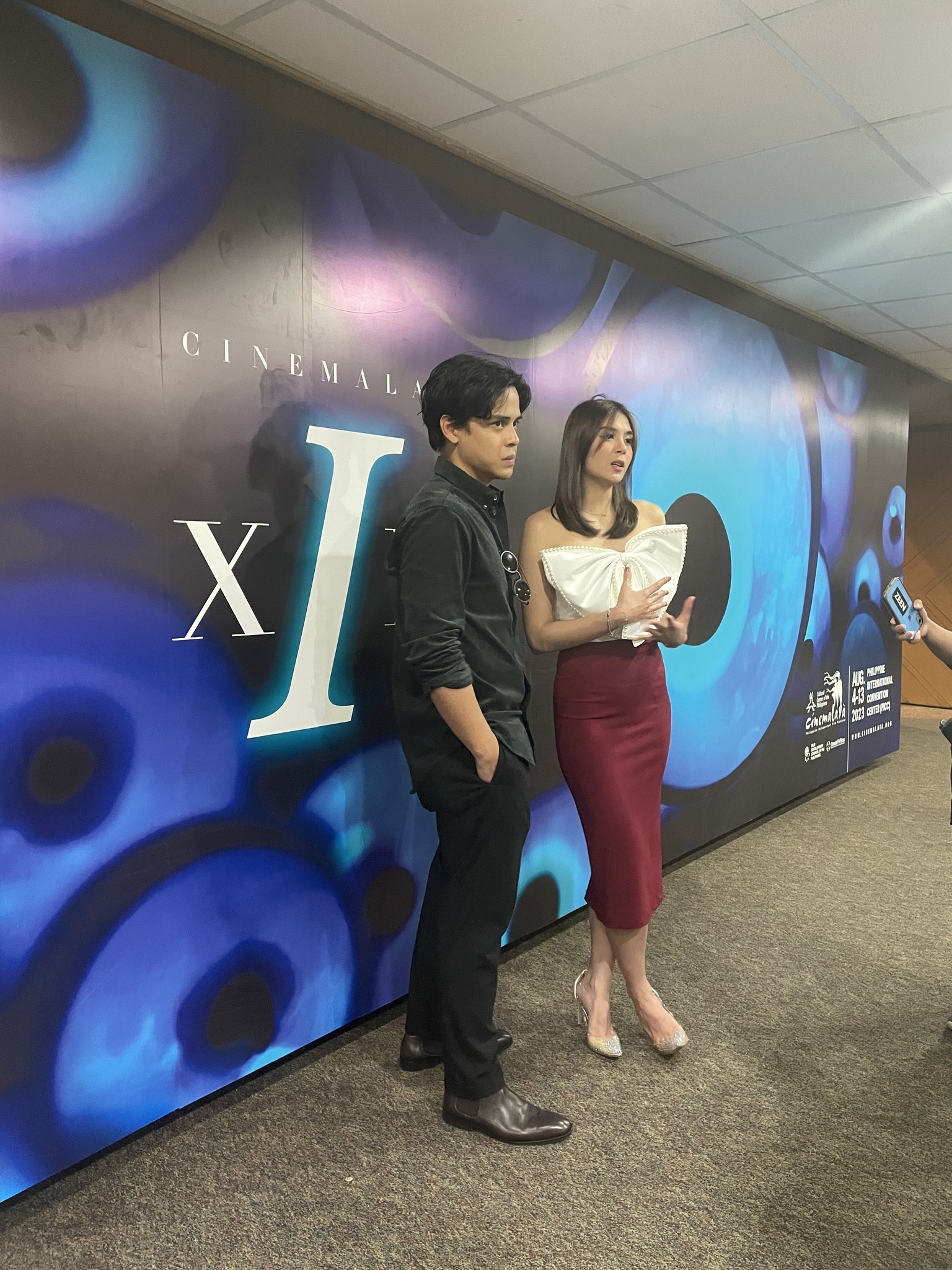
Ramos with his As If It's True co-star Ashley Ortega in 2023

Khalil Joseph Nepomuceno Ramos was born on January 22, 1996, in Parañaque, Philippines, to parents Lito Ramos and Tessa Nepomuceno, who are entrepreneurs. In 2013, he graduated high school from Colegio San Agustin in Makati.

Ramos was inspired by his father, who started to train him to be a singer at the age of 5. His talent was influenced by Michael Jackson, David Cook, Journey, and John Lennon. However, his musical taste matured from the influences of Queen, Aerosmith, and The Beatles while growing up. In 2011, he trained with Jay Glorioso of the UP Diliman College of Music and the Juilliard School of Performing Arts.

He is currently in a relationship with actress Gabbi Garcia since 2017.

== Filmography ==
=== Film ===
Year	Title	Role	Notes	Ref.
2014	She's Dating the Gangster	Lucas Lazaro	—N/a	
2014	Shake, Rattle & Roll XV	Gino	Part 3: Flight 666	
2015	Kid Kulafu	Eugene	—N/a	
2015	A Second Chance	Noel		
2015	Honor Thy Father	Emil		
2016	Everything About Her	Jared		
2016	The Achy Breaky Hearts	Keith		
2016	2 Cool 2 Be 4gotten	Felix Salonga		
2016	Ang Babae sa Septic Tank 2: ForeverisNotEnough	Lennon		
2017	Riding in Tandem	Jonard		
2018	Liway	Karl	competing entry in the 2018 Cinemalaya Film Festival	
2019	The Ghosting			
2019	Dead Kids	Paolo Gabriel		
2019	LSS (Last Song Syndrome)	Zack	Lead role	
2022	Resbak	Richard	shown in the Tokyo International Filmfest	
2023	As If It’s True	James	competing entry in the 2023 Cinemalaya Film Festival	
2023	GomBurZa	Jose Rizal		
2024	Fuchsia Libre	Patron		
2025	Olsen's Day	Olsen	Official entry to Puregold CinePanalo Film Festival 2025	
2025	One Hit Wonder	Entoy		

=== Television ===
Year	Title	Role	Notes	Ref.
2011	Pilipinas Got Talent^{1}	Himself	Season 3 Contestant / Grand Finalist and Runner-up	
2011	Gandang Gabi, Vice!^{2}	Himself	Guest	
2012	Sarah G. Live^{2}	Himself	Guest	
2012	Pinoy Big Brother: Teen Edition 4^{1}	Himself	Performer / B.F.F. at the Big Night	
2012	The X Factor Philippines^{1}	Himself	Musical Guest	
2012	Princess and I	Martin Nikolas "Kiko" Salamat	Mikay's Best Friend	
2012–2020	ASAP	Himself	Co-host / Performer, member of ASAP Boyfriendz	
2013	Wansapanataym: Eye Naku!	Allan	Season 4, Episode 134	
2013	Maalaala Mo Kaya: Box	Jayson	Season 21, Episode 130	
2013	Annaliza	Jeric Garcia	Supporting role / Louie's first love interest	
2014	Maalaala Mo Kaya: Santan	Janus	Season 21, Episode 158	
2014	Wansapanataym: Puppy ko si Papi	Jeff	Season 5, Episode 215	
2014	Maalaala Mo Kaya: Stars	Mark	Season 21, Episode 183	
2015	Pangako Sa 'Yo	Jasper Bejerano	Special Participation	
2017	A Love to Last	Red Hernandez		
2017–2018	La Luna Sangre	Lemuel Ruiz	Guest (later became a supporting character)	
2017	Maalaala Mo Kaya: Tubuhan	Noven Belleza		
2018	Bagani		Guest role	
2018	Maalaala Mo Kaya: Singsing	Aldrin		
2020	Make It with You	Atty. Stephen "Sputnik" Perez		
2020–2023	All-Out Sundays	Himself	Performer	
2021	Love vs Stars	Gali		
2021	Regal Studio Presents: One Million Comments, Magjo-jowa na Ako!	Prince Matt		
2021	Stories from the Heart: Love On Air	Joseph / DJ Jojo	Lead cast	
2022	Love You Stranger	Ben Mallari	Lead cast	
2023	Maria Clara at Ibarra	Basilio	Supporting Cast	
2023	Simula sa Gitna	Andrew	Main role	
2024	It's Showtime	Himself	Guest / Performer	
2025	How to Cheat Death	Miguel	Main role	
2026	Honor Thy Mother	Lorenzo de Leon	Main role	

- ^{1} Khalil Ramos guestings and appearances on Talent & Reality Game Shows
- ^{2} Khalil Ramos guestings and appearances on Variety & Talk Shows

== Discography ==
=== Album ===
Year	Album title	Details	Certification	Ref.
2012	Khalil Ramos	Released date: August 2012; Label: Star Records	—N/a	

=== Singles ===
Year	Track	Details	Ref.
2012	"Kung Ako Ba Siya"	Album: Love Songs from Princess and I; Related work: Princess and I; Released date: June 15, 2012; Label: Star Records	
2012	"Now We're Together"	Album: Love Songs from Princess and I; Related work: Princess and I; Released date: June 15, 2012; Label: Star Records	
2012	"Gusto Kita" (with Daniel Padilla and Enrique Gil)	Album: Love Songs from Princess and I; Related work: Princess and I; Released date: June 15, 2012; Label: Star Records	

=== Music videos ===
Year	Title	Details	Ref.
2012	"Kung Ako Na Lang Sana"	Album: Khalil Ramos; Label: Star Records	

=== Music video appearances ===
Year	Title	Performer	Ref.
2012	"Pinoy Summer, Da Best Forever"	Sarah Geronimo feat. Gerald Anderson	
2012	"Da Best ang Feeling"	Toni Gonzaga	
2012	"Lumiliwanag ang Mundo sa Kwento ng Pasko"	Various artists	
2019	"Pagtingin"	Ben&Ben	
2019	"Araw-Araw"	Ben&Ben	

=== Covers ===
Ramos became popular due to his viral cover songs. Most of these covers were courtesy of his guesting on the radio program The Roadshow on Wish 107.5 in 2016. Some of these covers include "Iris" (originally by Goo Goo Dolls). Due to his popularity, he guested again on the radio station for the second time in January 2017. In September 2019, Ramos, together with partner Gabbi Garcia, performed their rendition of "Pagtingin" by Ben&Ben.

== Theatre ==
Year	Title	Role	Production company	Venue	Notes	Ref
2023	Tick, Tick... BOOM!	Jon	9 Works Theatrical	RCBC Plaza	alternating with Jef Flores	
2025	Liwanag sa Dilim	Elesi	9 Works Theatrical	RCBC Plaza	alternating with Anthony Rosaldo	

== Accolades ==
Year	Award-giving Body	Category	Notable Works	Result	Ref.
2011	Google Philippines	Top 10 Newsmakers	Himself	Top 4	
2012	26th PMPC Star Awards for TV	Best New Male TV Personality	Himself	Nominated	
2012	4th FMTM awards for TV Entertainment Sec.	Rookie of the Year	Princess and I	Nominated	
2013	10th Golden Screen TV Awards	Outstanding Breakthrough Performance by an Actor	Princess and I	Nominated	
2013	Yes! 100 Most Beautiful Stars	100 Most Beautiful Stars	Himself	Included	
2013	5th PMPC Star Awards for Music	New Male Recording Artist of the Year	Khalil Ramos	Nominated	
2013	26th Awit Awards	Best Performance by a New Male Recording Artist	"Kung Ako Ba Siya"	Nominated	
2016	12th Cinema One Originals Film Festival	Best Actor	2 Cool 2 Be 4gotten	Nominated	
2017	40th Gawad Urian Awards	Best Actor	2 Cool 2 Be 4gotten	Nominated	
2019	Pista ng Pelikulang Pilipino 3	Best Actor	LSS (Last Song Syndrome)	Nominated	
2023	38th PMPC Star Awards for Movies	Best Supporting Actor	Resbak	Nominated	
2024	14th Gawad Buhay Awards	Male Lead Performance in a Musical	Tick, Tick… Boom!	Nominated	
2025	Puregold CinePanalo Film Festival 2025	Best Actor	Olsen's Day	Won	

Awards and achievements
Preceded by Happy Feet	Pilipinas Got Talent; Runner-up; 2011 (season 3)	Succeeded by Frankendal Fadroa
