= Gabbi Garcia =

Filipino actress, recording artist and model (born 1998)

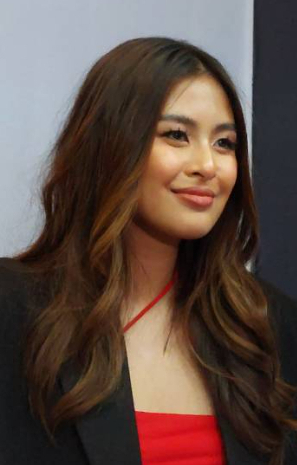
- Born: Gabriella Louise Ortega Lopez; December 2, 1998 (age 27); Makati, Philippines
- Occupations: Actress; singer; model; host; vlogger
- Years active: 2014–present
- Agent: Sparkle GMA Artist Center (2014–present)
- Height: 169 cm (5 ft 7 in)
- Partner: Khalil Ramos (2017–present)

Gabriella Louise Ortega Lopez (born December 2, 1998), known professionally as Gabbi Garcia (Tagalog: [ˈgabɪ gaɾˈsɪa]), is a Filipino actress, global endorser, singer, host and vlogger. She is currently connected to the GMA Network, Sparkle GMA Artist Center, and GMA Pictures.

== Early life ==
Gabriella Louise Ortega Lopez was born in Paranaque, Philippines, to parents Vince Pena Lopez, a security manager, and Tes Lopez, a flight attendant. She is the second child in the family. She spent her childhood in the family's ancestral home in Pasay. She graduated high school from St. Paul College, Pasig.

In her teenage years, she was a member of the school choir, dance troop, and cheering squad. She also won in a few beauty pageants before auditioning for GMA Artist Center.

== Career ==
Garcia began working in commercials and joining singing competitions. She made her television acting debut in 2014 as one of the young lead stars in GMA Network's primetime series My Destiny. For a few years, she was credited as Gabrielle Garcia.

She was later paired with Ruru Madrid in a loveteam, and together, they headlined various projects such as the teledrama Let the Love Begin, the political sitcom Naku, Boss Ko!, and the 2016 remake of the fantasy series Encantadia. In Encantadia, Garcia portrayed the breakout role of Sang'gre Alena, originally played by Karylle, elevating her and her co-stars' celebrity status.

The loveteam continued to collaborate in another television drama, Sherlock Jr., but in 2018, Garcia's protagonist character unexpectedly died in the middle of the series, marking the end of Garcia and Madrid's onscreen loveteam.

At the same year, Garcia starred in her first television drama outside the former loveteam through Pamilya Roces with Gloria Diaz and Carla Abellana. In 2019, she starred in the revenge drama series Beautiful Justice with Bea Binene and Yasmien Kurdi.

Garcia has since stated that she prefers a variety of leading men as opposed to a single long-term "love team." In the promotions for LSS (Last Song Syndrome), a movie in which her leading man is played by her real-life boyfriend Khalil Ramos, she and Ramos have refused to call themselves a love team.

In 2023, Garcia joined the cast of the romantic drama series Unbreak My Heart alongside Jodi Sta. Maria, Richard Yap and Joshua Garcia.

Gabbi is hosting Pinoy Big Brother: Celebrity Collab Edition alongside Mavy Legaspi, Bianca Gonzalez, Robi Domingo, Melai Cantiveros, Enchong Dee, Kim Chiu, and Alexa Ilacad. She took part in Pinoy Big Brother: Celebrity Collab Edition. Gabbi reflected on her experience, spending four days inside the house. “May pa impromptu skit, may pa dogshow hosting, kumain ng lahat ng klaseng luto ng gulay at white rice, nagtiyaga sa isang itlog per day, inulam ang chichirya, maraming tawanan, chikahan, at heartfelt iyakan (transl: There was an impromptu skit, dogshow hosting, eating all kinds of vegetable dishes and white rice, persevering with one egg per day, eating a chichirya as a viand, lots of laughter, teasing, and heartfelt crying.),” she said.

Gabbi played the character of Amelie Baltazar in GMA's first Viu original murder mystery series Slay, alongside Julie Anne San Jose, Mikee Quintos, Ysabel Ortega and Derrick Monasterio. She also starred in the Netflix original digital series How to Cheat Death with her real-life boyfriend Khalil Ramos.

== Other ventures ==
=== Business ===
In 2022, Garcia and Khalil Ramos partnered with CloudEats, a cloud kitchen company that specialized an online food concepts which helped them opened food business brand, Meat Up! which specialized all steak to sandwiches to rice meals.

The following year, she invested in cosmetic business, Five Brands, her own brand of beauty product.

In 2024, Garcia launched her Sandy & Shine, her own accessories brand collection being sold in Lazada.

== Personal life ==
Garcia previously dated actor and former onscreen partner Ruru Madrid in 2014. She is currently in a relationship with actor and singer Khalil Ramos since 2017.

In 2018, Garcia was diagnosed with polyendocrine metabolic ovarian syndrome (PMOS).

== Filmography ==
=== Film ===
Year	Title	Role
2016	Laut	Shana'a
2017	Meant to Beh	Alex Balatbat
2019	LSS (Last Song Syndrome)	Sarah
2025	Prisoner of War	Theresa

=== Television ===
Year	Title	Role	Notes
2014	My Destiny	Nicole Perez	
2014	Seasons of Love	Graciela "Gracia" Jimenez	Episode: "My Soulmate, My Soulhate"
2014	Magpakailanman	Franz	Episode: "One Last Chance: The Jam and Michelle Story"
2015	InstaDad	Marikit "Kit" Monteamor	
2015	Let the Love Begin	Sophia Alexandra "Pia" E. Sta. Maria	
2015	Magpakailanman	Pia	Episode: "Ina ko, Bugaw ko"
2015	Wagas	Aleine Robrigado	Episode: "Anjo and Aleine Robrigado Love Story"
2016	Wagas	Cata Tibayan	Episode: "Fairy Tale Love: The Cata Tibayan & Jert Yao Story"
2016	Maynila	Beverly	Episode: "All About Space"
2016	Naku, Boss Ko!	Cheverlyn "Che" Dimasupil	
2016–2017	Encantadia	Sang'gre / Hara Alena / Akesha	
2017	Daig Kayo ng Lola Ko	Mariel	Episode: "Mariel: Ang Lakwatserang Sirena"
2018	Sherlock Jr.	Lily Pelaez	
2018	Victor Magtanggol	Lena	
2018	Daig Kayo ng Lola Ko: Witchikels	Winslet	
2018	Pamilya Roces	Jade Austria Roces	
2019–2020	Beautiful Justice	Sabrina "Brie" Cuevas-Decena / Sabrina "Brie" Cuevas-Ocampo	
2021	Regal Studio Presents	Anna Marie	Episode: "One Million Comments, Magjo-jowa na Ako!"
2021	Stories From The Heart: Love On Air	Wanda Dimaano / Miss Wonderful	
2022	Happy Together	Gwen	Guest
2022	Love You Stranger	Lerma Jane "LJ" Escalante	
2023	Mga Lihim ni Urduja	Crystal Posadas / Crystal Dayanghirang	
2023	Unbreak My Heart	Alexandra "Alex / Xandra" Jacinto Zhang	
2025–2026	Encantadia Chronicles: Sang'gre	Sang'gre / Hara Alena	
2025	Slay	Amelie Baltazar	
2025	How to Cheat Death	Lara	

Reality and variety shows
Year	Title	Notes
2014–2015	Sunday All Stars	Co-host / Performer
2015–2016	Wowowin	Co-host
2015–2018	Sunday PinaSaya	Co-host / Various roles
2018–2019	Studio 7	Co-host / Performer
2020–2023	All-Out Sundays	Main host / Performer
2020–2021	IRL (In Real Life)	Host
2021	Eat Bulaga!	Guest co-host
2023–present	It's Showtime	Guest Hurado / Performer
2025	Pinoy Big Brother: Celebrity Collab Edition	Host / Houseguest
2025–2026	Pinoy Big Brother: Celebrity Collab Edition 2.0	Host
2026–present	The Voice Kids Philippines	Journey host
2026–present	Pinoy Big Brother: Collab 3.0	Host

=== Digital ===
Year	Title	Role
2022	ERO	Malaya Matapang (voice)

=== Music video appearances ===
Year	Title	Performer	Director	Ref.
2019	Pagtingin	Ben&Ben	Jorel Lising	
2019	Araw-Araw	Ben&Ben	Quark Henares	

== Discography ==
=== Singles ===
Year	Title	Album	Label
2016	"Love You The Way I Do" (duet with Ruru Madrid)	One Heart	GMA Records
2017	"All I Need"	All I Need (Single)	GMA Records

== Awards and nominations ==
Year	Organization	Category	Result
2014	28th PMPC Star Awards for Television	Best New Female TV Personality	Nominated
2015	6th Golden TV Screen Awards	Outstanding Breakthrough Performance by An Actress	Won
2016	The PEP List Awards Year 3	Female Stylish Star of the Year	Won
2016	64th FAMAS Awards	German Moreno Youth Achievement Award	Won
2017	33rd PMPC Star Awards for Movies	New Movie Actress of the Year	Nominated
2017	4th Inding-Indie Film Festival	Huwarang Artista ng Kabataan	Won
2018	5th Inding-Indie Film Festival	Pusong Sining for Best TV Personality Excellence Award	Won
2020	7th Urduja Heritage Film Awards	Best Actress in a Comedy or Musical for LSS	Won
