= Love You Stranger =

2022 Philippine television drama series

- Title card
- Genre: Romantic drama; Mystery
- Directed by: King Mark Baco
- Starring: Gabbi Garcia; Khalil Ramos
- Opening theme: "You Found Me" by Khalil Ramos and Gabbi Garcia
- Ending theme: "Safe with Me" by Kim de Leon
- Country of origin: Philippines
- Original language: Tagalog
- No. of episodes: 40

Production
- Camera setup: Multiple-camera setup
- Running time: 25–33 minutes
- Production company: GMA Public Affairs

Original release
- Network: GMA Network
- Release: June 6 – August 11, 2022

Love You Stranger is a 2022 Philippine television drama mystery romance series broadcast by GMA Network. Directed by King Mark Baco, it stars Gabbi Garcia and Khalil Ramos. It premiered on June 6, 2022 on the network's Telebabad line up. The series concluded on August 11, 2022, with a total of 40 episodes.

The series is streaming online on YouTube.

== Cast and characters ==
Cast

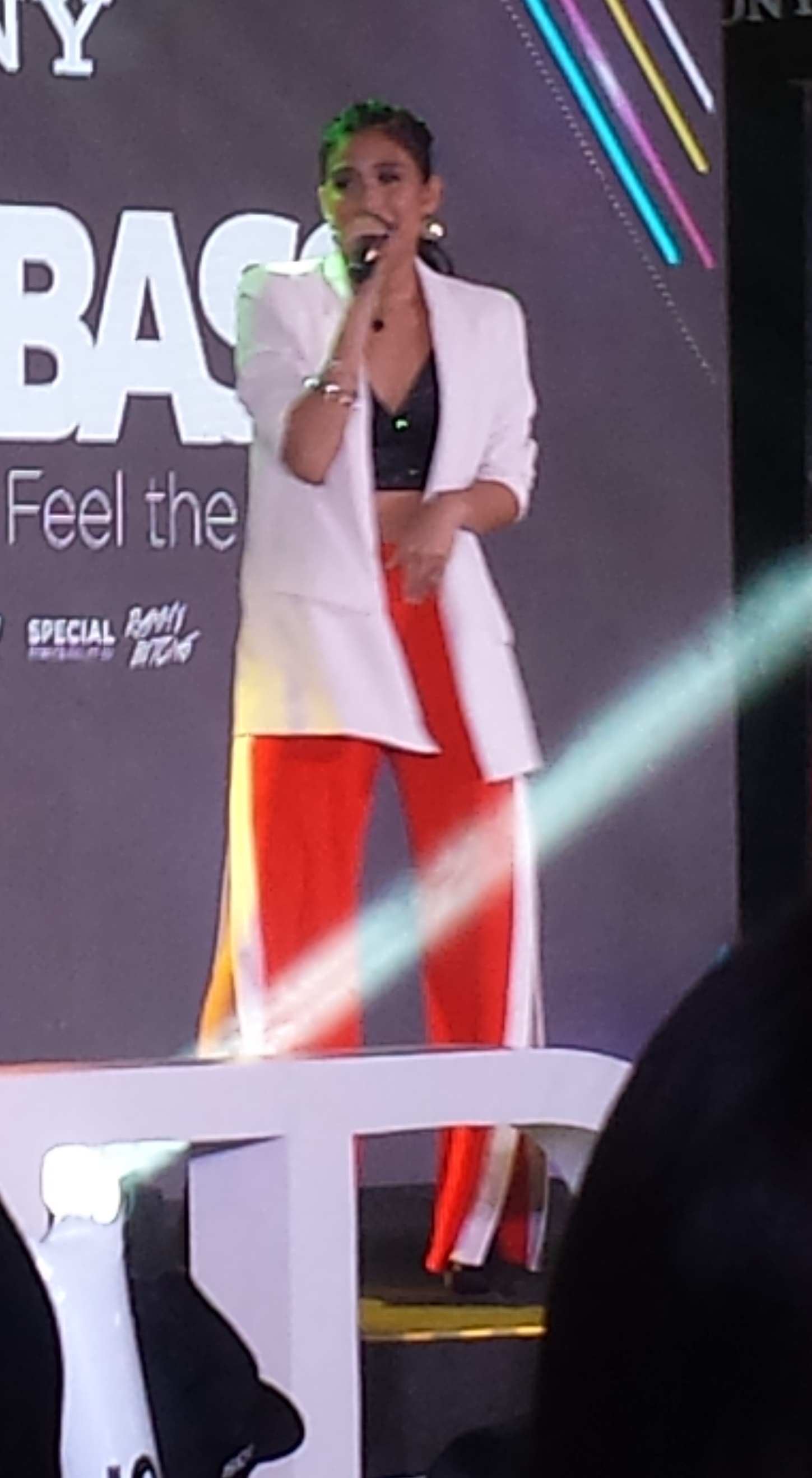
Gabbi Garcia

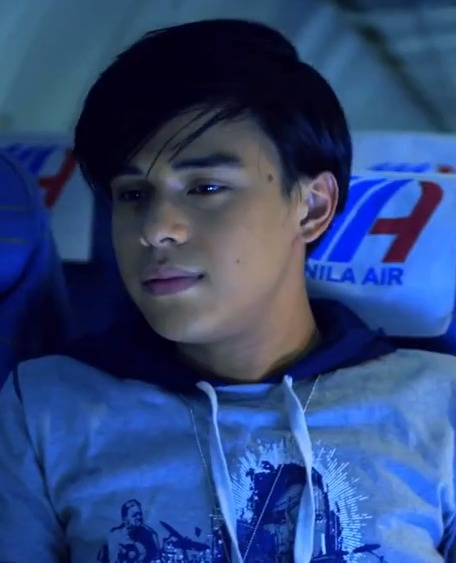
Khalil Ramos

Lead cast

- Gabbi Garcia as Lerma Jane "LJ" Escalante
- Khalil Ramos as Benedict "Ben" Mallari

Supporting cast

- Gil Cuerva as Tristan Dela Paz
- Andrea Del Rosario as Lorraine Escalante
- Tonton Gutierrez as Alfonso "Alfie" Dela Paz
- Carmi Martin as Patricia "Patty" Salazar-Dela Paz
- Maey Bautista as Apple Escalante
- Kim De Leon as Diego David
- Lexi Gonzales as Coleen Castro
- Dindo Arroyo as Bienvenido "Boying" Chavez
- Bodjie Pascua as Larry Advincula
- Alex Medina as Bill
- Ces Quesada as Edna Malabanan
- Nor Domingo as Rodolfo
- Lui Manansala as Norma
- Soliman Cruz as Pete Escarlan
- Angeli Nicole Sanoy as Bunny
- Dennis Padilla as Luciano

Guest cast

- Pen Medina as Harry
- Dentrix Ponce as younger Ben
- Kyle Ocampo as younger LJ
- Levince Sotto as younger Tristan
- Wendell Ramos as Javier Escalante

== Production ==
Principal photography commenced on February 16, 2021.

== Ratings ==
According to AGB Nielsen Philippines' Nationwide Urban Television Audience Measurement People Overnight Ratings, the pilot episode of Love You Stranger earned a 6.5% rating.
