= The Ones We Once Loved =

2022 single by Ben&Ben

Single by Ben&Ben
- Language: English
- Released: August 26, 2022
- Genre: Ballad
- Length: 4:33
- Label: Sony Philippines
- Songwriter: Paolo Benjamin Guico
- Producers: Johnoy Danao; Jean-Paul Verona

Ben&Ben singles chronology
"Langyang Pag-Ibig" (2022)	"The Ones We Once Loved" (2022)	"Dear" (2022)

"The Ones We Once Loved" is a song by Filipino folk-pop band Ben&Ben. It was released as a digital single on August 26, 2022, through Sony Music Philippines. Written by Paolo Benjamin Guico and produced by Johnoy Danao and Jean-Paul Verona, the ballad track describes a unique perspective on love, forgiveness, and breakup, highlighting the unspoken aspects of a painful breakup through its stripped-down lyrics. The music video was directed by Niq Ablao, and stars Paolo Benjamin Guico and his ex-girlfriend Bea Lorenzo as a couple experiencing a challenging breakup. Its storyline was drawn from the former couple's actual experiences, with visuals offering an intimate perspective on healing. The song was nominated for the Song of the Year at the 36th Awit Awards and Ballad Song of the Year at the 8th Wish 107.5 Music Awards.

== Background and release ==
The band teased the track on social media quotes and a billboard, following their June releases of "Paninindigan Kita" and "Langyang Pag-Ibig," and their collaboration with Pamungkas on an English version of the former. It was released on August 26, 2022, through Sony Music Philippines.

Prior to the single release, Paolo described that the song is a letter to individuals who have influenced their lives, expressing thanks, apologies, and farewells, sentiments they typically keep understated but chose to vocalize more in this particular song.

Mysterious billboards and posters referencing the band's single release had been spotted across Metro Manila, featuring personal thoughts such as "So I apologize for coming into your life", "Maybe we were meant to be a lesson to each other", and "Did it ever cross your mind that maybe you hurt me too?". These materials, including discarded film photos, have appeared in various locations including gates, lampposts, and the billboard strip near the Guadalupe Bridge.

== Composition ==
Written by Paolo Benjamin Guico and produced by Johnoy Danao and Jean-Paul Verona, the ballad track describes a unique perspective on love, forgiveness, and breakup, highlighting the unspoken aspects of a painful breakup through its stripped-down lyrics. Paolo discussed the inspiration for his song on Instagram. He revealed that the song stems from the end of a long-term relationship he had shared with his audience. He also described the song, primarily featuring piano and violin, as one of his most personal and vulnerable creations.

Poch, the band's guitarist, said that the recording process for this song began with the piano, which served as the foundational instrument, followed by the guitar, violin, and vocals, differing from the band's typical approach of commencing with heavy instruments like drums and bass before lightening the arrangement. He also said that despite the song's heartbreaking theme, recording sessions were reportedly enjoyable.

== Music video ==
The music video was released on September 3, 2022, and was directed by Niq Ablao, and stars Paolo Benjamin Guico and his ex-girlfriend Bea Lorenzo as a couple experiencing a challenging breakup. The storyline draws from the former couple's actual experiences, with visuals offering an intimate perspective on healing. This process involves acknowledging personal errors, apologizing for relational harm, and engaging in self-forgiveness to facilitate complete moving on.

Director Niq Abalo describes this as a process of "making amends with one’s self, and the person on the other end of the grieving process." The authenticity of Bea and Paolo's energy contributes to the narrative's emotional depth. The band stated that they acknowledged the rarity of achieving closure like Pao and Bea, and even more so of creating art that honors a departed relationship.

== Credits and personnel ==
Credits are adapted from Apple Music.

- Ben&Ben - vocals
- Paolo Benjamin Guico - songwriter
- Johnoy Danao - producer
- Jean-Paul Verona - producer

== Accolades ==
Awards and nominations for "The Ones We Once Loved"
Year	Award	Category	Result	Ref.
2023	Awit Awards	Song of the Year	Nominated	
2023	Wish 107.5 Music Awards	Ballad Song of the Year	Nominated	
