= Heaven (Tilly Birds song) =

Single by Tilly Birds and Ben&Ben

from the album I'll Remember To Forget You
- Language: English
- Released: September 25, 2025
- Genre: Pop
- Length: 3:57
- Label: GMM Grammy; Warner Music Thailand
- Songwriters: Tilly Birds; Ben&Ben
- Lyricists: Tilly Birds; Ben&Ben
- Producers: Tilly Birds; Ben&Ben

Tilly Birds singles chronology
"Never A Waste Of Time" (2025)	"Heaven" (2025)

Ben&Ben singles chronology
"Sa Kapwa Ko Ay Alay" (2025)	"Heaven" (2025)	"Duyan" (2026)

Music video
- "Heaven" on YouTube

"Heaven" is a song recorded by Thai alternative rock band Tilly Birds and Filipino folk-pop band Ben&Ben. It was written and produced by the former and the latter. It is a pop track that expresses the joy of meeting someone special at the perfect moment, capturing the essence of love that feels heavenly. The song was released on September 25, 2025, through GMM Grammy & Warner Music Thailand, accompanied with a music video.

== Background and release ==
After the two bands met in Malaysia in early 2024, the song has been developed over nearly two years and was released on September 25, 2025, accompanied with a music video filmed in the Philippines. This track continues Thai band Tilly Birds' trend of English singles, following "Never A Waste Of Time" and "Retro 39", as they hint at an upcoming fully-English album. Meanwhile, Ben&Ben collaborated with Moira dela Torre on a new version of her song "I'm Okay", which was released in July 2025.

== Composition ==
The track is three minutes and fifty-seven seconds long, and was written and produced by Tilly Birds and Ben&Ben. It is a pop track that expresses the joy of meeting someone special at the perfect moment, capturing the essence of love that feels heavenly.

== Credits and personnel ==
Credits are adapted from Apple Music.

- Tilly Birds - vocals, arranger, composer, lyrics, vocal producer
- Ben&Ben - vocals, arranger, composer, lyrics, producer
- Thuwanon Tantiwattanaworakul - drums
- Nutdanai Chuchat - guitar
- Anuroth Ketlekha - vocals
