= Di Ka Sayang =

2020 song by Filipino folk-pop band Ben&Ben

Single by Ben&Ben
- Released: November 6, 2020
- Recorded: 2020
- Length: 4:14
- Label: Sony Music Philippines
- Songwriters: Paolo Benjamin Guico; Miguel Benjamin Guico
- Producers: Jean Paul Verona; Poch Baretto; Toni Muñoz; Patricia Lasaten; Keifer Cabugao

Ben&Ben singles chronology
"Nakikinig Ka Ba sa Akin" (2020)	"Di Ka Sayang" (2020)	"Inevitable" (2021)

Music video
- "Di Ka Sayang" on YouTube

"Di Ka Sayang" (lit. 'You're Not Worthless') is a song by Filipino folk-pop band Ben&Ben, composed by lead vocalists Paolo Benjamin and Miguel Benjamin Guico. It was released on November 6, 2020. Since its release, the song suddenly hit No. 1 on Spotify's Philippines Top 50 playlist.

== Background ==
But sometimes, hearing the words "di ka sayang" (you are not worthless) and "tanggap kita" (I accept you) is all we need to begin our journey of healing, and embracing our true self, especially if we've come from a place of feeling hopeless and worthless.

— Ben&Ben, Twitter (November 2020)

Led by twins Paolo Benjamin and Miguel Benjamin Guico, Ben&Ben released a teaser on social media as part of the band's "new era" on October 30, 2020.

The song's composition, according to Paolo, was inspired by a conversation he had with brother Miguel during one of their shows in 2019. As the band reached No. 1 on Spotify's Philippines Top 50, the band took to Twitter in a series of tweets addressing on self-acceptance and self-care.

== Release ==
As being announced, the single was set to release at midnight on November 6. However, due to technical difficulties, the band uploaded a video version of the single on their official Facebook page minutes before midnight. By the day, the single was later on made available on digital platforms.

=== Music video ===
The music video of the song was directed by Jorel Lising, responsible for the direction of the music video of Pagtingin, and was released on November 9, 2020. The music video shows each member performing in various settings with Kintsugi artform as the background, moving to dim spaces, and performing together in a well illuminated room in the end.

== Awards and nominations ==
Year	Award	Category	Result	Ref.
2021	34th Awit Awards	Favorite Song of the Year	Nominated	
2021	34th Awit Awards	Best Performance by a Group Recording Artist	Nominated	
2021	34th Awit Awards	Record of the Year	Won	
2021	34th Awit Awards	Best Inspirational Recording	Won	
