= LSS (Last Song Syndrome) =

2019 musical romantic drama film by Jade Castro

- Film poster
- Directed by: Jade Castro
- Written by: Jade Castro; Siege Ledesma
- Produced by: Armi Rae S. Cacanindin; Emmanuel A. Dela Cruz; Kren V. Yap
- Starring: Gabbi Garcia; Khalil Ramos; Tuesday Vargas; Ben&Ben
- Cinematography: Malay Javier; Pao Orendain
- Edited by: Jeremiah Domingo
- Music by: Pat Lasaten
- Production companies: Globe Studios; Dokimos Media Studios; Ben&Ben
- Distributed by: Film Development Council of the Philippines
- Release date: September 13, 2019 (Pista ng Pelikulang Pilipino)
- Running time: 105 minutes
- Country: Philippines
- Language: Filipino

LSS (Last Song Syndrome) is a 2019 Filipino musical romantic drama film written and directed by Jade Castro. The film stars Gabbi Garcia, Khalil Ramos, Tuesday Vargas, and Filipino folk-pop band Ben&Ben.

A co-production of Globe Studios, Dokimos Media Studios, and Ben&Ben, it had a theatrical release in the Philippines on September 13, 2019, as one of the entries of the 2019 Pista ng Pelikulang Pilipino.

== Plot ==
Aspiring musician Sarah and romantic Zack find themselves in the most unfortunate situations in their separate lives. Struggling to navigate through life, they both unexpectedly found a common bond in their love of music and being fans of Ben&Ben coincidentally.

== Cast ==
- Gabbi Garcia as Sarah
- Khalil Ramos as Zack
- Tuesday Vargas as Ruby
- Bernard Palanca as Buboy
- Elijah Canlas as Cedie
- Iana Bernardez as Cha
- Jam Rances as Ate Maj
- Eian Rances as Elmer
- Ameera Johara as Cindy
- Mika Manikan as Abi
- Ben&Ben as themselves
  - Miguel Guico
  - Paolo Guico
  - Jam Villanueva
  - Agnes Reoma
  - Pat Lasaten
  - Keifer Cabugao
  - Poch Barretto
  - Andrew De Pano
  - Toni Muñoz
- Ebe Dancel

== Soundtrack ==
Ten original songs were featured in the film, namely "Ride Home," "Branches," "Leaves," "Kathang Isip," "Bibingka," "Fall," "Maybe The Night," "Mitsa (Salamat)," "Araw-Araw," and "Pagtingin" which are all performed by Ben&Ben. For these songs, Ben&Ben received positive responses, with "Araw-Araw" winning Best Original Song at Pista ng Pelikulang Pilipino Awards.

== Release ==
LSS was one of the first 3 films the Film Development Council of the Philippines (FDCP) announced to be official entries for the 3rd Pista ng Pelikulang Pilipino, where it premiered on September 13, 2019.

LSS was also available for streaming on November 29, 2019, on iflix. The film was screened on March 8 & 10, 2020 as an official entry under New Action! Southeast Asia category in the 15th Osaka Asian Film Festival in Osaka, Japan.

== Accolades ==
Year	Award-giving body	Recipient(s)	Award	Result	Ref.
2019	3rd Pista ng Pelikulang Pilipino	Khalil Ramos	Best Actor	Nominated	
2019	3rd Pista ng Pelikulang Pilipino	Tuesday Vargas	Best Supporting Actress	Won	
2019	3rd Pista ng Pelikulang Pilipino	Jade Castro	Best Director	Nominated	
2019	3rd Pista ng Pelikulang Pilipino	LSS (Last Song Syndrome)	Best Picture	Nominated	
2019	3rd Pista ng Pelikulang Pilipino	Siege Ledesma & Jade Castro	Best Screenplay	Nominated	
2019	3rd Pista ng Pelikulang Pilipino	Erickson Navarro	Best Production Design	Nominated	
2019	3rd Pista ng Pelikulang Pilipino	Pao Orendain & Malay Javier	Best Cinematography	Nominated	
2019	3rd Pista ng Pelikulang Pilipino	Pat Lasaten	Best Musical Score	Nominated	
2019	3rd Pista ng Pelikulang Pilipino	Araw-Araw by Ben&Ben	Best Original Song	Won	
2019	3rd Pista ng Pelikulang Pilipino	Aurel Claro Bilbao & Arnel Labayo	Best Sound Design	Won	
2019	3rd Pista ng Pelikulang Pilipino	LSS (Last Song Syndrome)	Special Jury Award	Won	
2019	3rd Pista ng Pelikulang Pilipino	LSS (Last Song Syndrome)	PISTAPP Audience Choice Award	Won	
2020	7th Urduja Heritage Film Festival	Gabbi Garcia	Best Actress in a Comedy or Musical	Won	
2021	36th PMPC Star Awards for Movies	LSS (Last Song Syndrome)	Movie of the Year	Nominated	
2021	36th PMPC Star Awards for Movies	Jade Castro	Movie Director of the Year	Nominated	
2021	36th PMPC Star Awards for Movies	Tuesday Vargas	Movie Supporting Actress of the Year	Nominated	
2021	36th PMPC Star Awards for Movies	Jeremiah Domingo	Movie Editor of the Year	Nominated	
2021	36th PMPC Star Awards for Movies	Pat Lasaten	Movie Musical Scorer of the Year	Won	
2021	36th PMPC Star Awards for Movies	Aurel Claro Bilbao & Arnel Labayo	Movie Sound Engineer of the Year	Nominated	
2021	36th PMPC Star Awards for Movies	Araw-Araw by Ben&Ben	Movie Theme Song of the Year	Won	
2021	36th PMPC Star Awards for Movies	Gabbi Garcia and Khalil Ramos	Movie Love Team of the Year	Nominated	
