= Araw-Araw =

2019 song by Filipino folk-pop band Ben&Ben

Single by Ben&Ben

from the album Limasawa Street
- Released: May 2, 2019
- Recorded: 2019
- Studio: Spryta Productions Inc. (Mandaluyong, Metro Manila)
- Genre: Pop ballad
- Length: 5:14
- Label: Sindikato; Sony Music Philippines
- Songwriters: Miguel Benjamin Guico; Paolo Benjamin Guico
- Producers: Ben&Ben; Jean Paul Verona

Ben&Ben singles chronology
"Pagtingin" (2019)	"Araw-Araw" (2019)	"Masyado Pang Maaga" (2019)

Music video
- "Araw-Araw" on YouTube

"Araw-Araw" (lit. 'Everyday') is a song by Filipino folk-pop band Ben&Ben,It was released alongside "Pagtingin" on May 2, 2019, under Sindikato and Sony Music Philippines. Written by lead vocalists and twins Paolo and Miguel Benjamin Guico, the modern-day ballad track describes a journey from a chance encounter to loving commitment. The track was featured as the theme song for the film LSS (Last Song Syndrome) released in 2019 under Globe Studios.

The song won the 2019 Pista ng Pelikulang Pilipino Award for Best Original Song. It also won the Wishclusive Contemporary Folk Performance of the Year at the 6th Wish 107.5 Music Awards and Movie Theme Song of the Year at the PMPC Star Awards for Movies.

== Background and release ==
The song was released on May 2, 2019, alongside "Pagtingin", under Sindikato and Sony Music Philippines. The two singles were a part of the band's debut album, titled Limasawa Street.

== Composition ==
The track is five minutes and fourteen seconds long, and was produced by Ben&Ben and Jean-Paul Verona. Written by lead vocalists and twins Paolo and Miguel Benjamin Guico, the modern-day ballad track describes a journey from a chance encounter to loving commitment.

== Music video ==
The music video of the song was directed by Quark Henares and produced by Globe Studios as a sequel to the music video of "Pagtingin", with appearances from Gabbi Garcia and Khalil Ramos and was released on September 28, 2019. The music video continues the narrative from "Pagtingin", which concluded with a theme of heartbreak.

== Credits and personnel ==
Credits are adapted from Apple Music.

- Ben&Ben – vocals, producer
- Miguel Benjamin Guico – songwriter
- Paolo Benjamin Guico – songwriter
- Jean-Paul Verona – producer
- Waxiefied Sound Production – mastering engineer, mixing engineer for Dolby Atmos
- Waxie Joaquin – mastering engineer, mixing engineer for Dolby Atmos

== Awards and nominations ==
Year	Award	Category	Result	Ref.
2019	3rd Pista ng Pelikulang Pilipino Awards	Best Original Song	Won	
2021	6th Wish Music Awards	Wishclusive Contemporary Folk Performance of the Year	Won	
2021	PMPC Star Awards for Movies	Movie Theme Song of the Year	Won	
