= Lifetime (Ben&Ben song) =

2020 single by Ben&Ben

Single by Ben&Ben
- Released: June 4, 2020
- Recorded: 2020
- Length: 2:51
- Label: Sony Philippines
- Songwriters: Miguel Benjamin Guico; Paolo Benjamin Guico
- Producers: Ben&Ben; Jean Paul Verona

Ben&Ben singles chronology
"Doors" (2020)	"Lifetime" (2020)	"Nakikinig Ka Ba sa Akin" (2020)

Music video
- "Lifetime" on YouTube

"Lifetime" is a song by Filipino folk-pop band Ben&Ben. It was released as a digital single on June 4, 2020, through Sony Music Philippines. It was written by Miguel and Paolo Benjamin Guico and produced by Jean-Paul Verona and the band. A reimagined version was released on March 31, 2026, which features additional verses, an instrumental break, and a bridge, resulting in an extended duration of four minutes and thirty-seven seconds. That same year, the original version debuted at two national Billboard charts, both peaking at number one on the Philippines Hot 100 and Top Philippine Songs, respectively.

== Background ==
We didn't know that if only one of us dared to make a move, a lifetime was waiting for us.

— Anne jou, an excerpt from the YouTube comment

The song was inspired by a fan's comment from the music video of "Pagtingin" on YouTube. The fan, who uses the name Anne jou on YouTube, wrote her experience of being secretly in love with her best friend, but was scared of expressing her feelings as she feared of losing her friendship with him. Eight years later, at her best friend's wedding with another woman, he thanked her for being her best friend and confessed that, just like her, he had feelings for her, but was scared of expressing his feelings for her fearing the loss of their friendship also.

== Release and music video ==
The standalone single and lyric video were released on Spotify and YouTube respectively on June 4, 2020. The music video was written and directed by Raymond Dacones and Trina Razon, and was released on July 29, 2020. It depicts a man who paints a woman in a yellow dress. It features scenes of them dancing together and exploring artworks in a gallery, holding hands. The narrative concludes with the painter awakening in front of his canvas, understanding that the joyful moments spent dancing were merely a dream.

According to Paolo Benjamin of the band, the music video serves as a metaphor for themes of lost love, regrets, and hypothetical scenarios, inviting diverse interpretations from viewers. The work emphasizes the importance of honesty and proactivity in expressing feelings before it's too late.

== Reimagined version ==
"Lifetime (Reimagined)"

Song by Ben&Ben

from the album Nine
- Language: English
- Released: March 31, 2026
- Length: 4:37
- Label: Sony Philippines
- Songwriters: Miguel Benjamin Guico; Paolo Benjamin Guico
- Producers: Paolo Benjamin Guico; Jean-Paul Verona

Lyric video
- "Lifetime (Reimagined)" on YouTube

A reimagined version of the song was teased on Instagram hours before its release, accompanied by the caption "How do you grieve for a love that didn’t even exist?" The version was released on March 31, 2026, and includes additional verses, an instrumental break, and a bridge, extending its duration to four minutes and thirty-seven seconds compared to the original.

According to the band, they expressed their intent to connect with listeners experiencing pain, longing, and yearning through new lyrics and melodies. They convey gratitude for the positive reception of the song and commit to continuing to create music that deeply connects with their listeners, referred to as Liwanag.

== Commercial performance ==
In 2025, the original version debuted at two national Billboard charts, peaking at number 5 and 4 on the Philippines Hot 100 and Top Philippine Songs, respectively.

== Performances ==
- In 2020, albeit being held virtually, Ben&Ben recorded a performance of the song for the Myx Music Awards 2020.

== Credits and personnel ==
Credits appear on Tidal, lyric video, and official video.

- Ben&Ben - performer, producer
- Paolo Benjamin Guico - primary vocals, lyrics and music
- Miguel Benjamin Guico - primary vocals, lyrics and music
- Andrew De Pano - arrangement, backing vocals
- Toni Muñoz - arrangement, backing vocals
- Pat Lasaten - arrangement
- Keifer Cabugao - arrangement
- Agnes Reoma - arrangement
- Jam Villanueva - arrangement
- Poch Barretto - arrangement
- Jean Paul Verona - producer and mixing
- Leon Zervos - mastering engineer

== Awards and nominations ==
Year	Award	Category	Result	Ref.
2021	6th Wish 107.5 Music Awards	Wish Contemporary Folk Song of the Year	Won	
2021	16th Myx Music Awards	Song of the Year	Nominated	
2021	34th Awit Awards	Favorite Song of the Year	Nominated	

== Charts ==
Chart performance for "Lifetime"
Chart (2026)	Peak position
Philippines (IFPI)	1
Philippines Hot 100 (Billboard Philippines)	1
Philippines Top Songs (Billboard Philippines)	1
