= Limasawa Street =

Studio album by Ben&Ben
- Released: May 12, 2019
- Recorded: 2019
- Studio: Spryta Productions Inc. (Mandaluyong, Metro Manila)
- Genre: Indie folk; pop rock
- Length: 51:04
- Label: Sindikato; Sony Music Philippines
- Producer: Jean Paul Verona; Johnoy Danao

Ben&Ben chronology
Ben&Ben EP (2016)	Limasawa Street (2019)	Pebble House, Vol. 1: Kuwaderno (2021)

Singles from Limasawa Street
- 1. "Mitsa (Salamat)" Released: February 14, 2019; 2. "Pagtingin" Released: May 2, 2019; 3. "Araw-Araw" Released: May 2, 2019

Limasawa Street is the debut studio album by Filipino indie folk-pop band Ben&Ben. It was released on May 12, 2019 by Sony Music Philippines. In 2022, the album was certified quadruple-platinum.

== Background ==
Led by twins Paolo Guico and Miguel Guico, Ben&Ben announced on social media that they will be releasing their debut album in May 2019 after topping streaming platforms and radio charts with singles "Kathang Isip", "Ride Home" and "Maybe the Night".

Limasawa Street is derived from the Butuanon word 'masawa' which means 'light', and is also the name of a street that is special in one of the Ben&Ben members, grounded with a "deeply personal story that offers the comforts of life and home". Paolo shared, "We wanted the album to represent a place of light by singing about hopeful perspectives in troubling situations." In November 2019, during a press interview, Ben&Ben mentioned that the band's team are currently discussing about a possibility of releasing a deluxe version of the album.

=== Singles ===
"Mitsa (Salamat)" is a love song and a reminder at the same time. It teaches us how our time and love didn’t go to waste despite the relationship coming to an end. “Salamat” in the title teaches us that even if the fire could no longer burn, we must remain grateful for the feelings, memories, and lessons that it gave us.

— Paolo Guico, UDOU (February 2019)

The first single "Mitsa (Salamat)" was released 3 months before the album was launched. 'Mitsa' translates to candle wick.

The second single "Pagtingin" and the third single "Araw-Araw" from the album were released on May 2, 2019.

== Tour ==
Limasawa Street Album Tour
- Tour by Ben&Ben
- Location: Asia
- Associated album: Limasawa Street
- Start date: 17 May 2019
- End date: 17 August 2019
- Legs: 1
- No. of shows: 12

On April 9, 2019, Ben&Ben announced their headlining tour of the Philippines to support Limasawa Street in 2019, with Ayala Malls as the main presenting sponsor.

== Track listing ==
Limasawa Street track listing
No.	Title	Lyrics	Music	Producer(s)	Length
1.	"Limasawa Street" (Steve Lilywhite Mix)	P. Guico; M. Guico	P. Guico; M. Guico	Jean-Paul Verona; Steve Lilywhite; Ben&Ben	3:46
2.	"Pagtingin"	P. Guico	P. Guico	Jean-Paul Verona; Ben&Ben	3:48
3.	"Fall"	P. Guico; M. Guico	P. Guico; M. Guico	Jean-Paul Verona; Leon Zervos; Miles Walker; Ben&Ben	4:01
4.	"Talaarawan"	P. Guico; M. Guico; T. Muñoz	P. Guico; M. Guico	Jean-Paul Verona; Ben&Ben	3:35
5.	"Hummingbird"	P. Guico	P. Guico	Jean-Paul Verona; Ben&Ben	4:25
6.	"Mitsa (Salamat)"	P. Guico; M. Guico	P. Guico; M. Guico	Jean-Paul Verona; Ben&Ben	4:26
7.	"Baka Sakali" (featuring Ebe Dancel)	P. Guico; M. Guico	P. Guico; M. Guico	Jean-Paul Verona; Ben&Ben	3:19
8.	"Lucena"	P. Guico	P. Guico	Jean-Paul Verona; Ben&Ben	3:41
9.	"Sampaguita"	P. Guico; M. Guico	P. Guico; M. Guico	Jean-Paul Verona; Ben&Ben	3:09
10.	"War (Note: The song is performed by Keifer Cabugao, the song's writer and the band's violinist.)"	K. Cabugao	K. Cabugao	Jean-Paul Verona; Ben&Ben	3:48
11.	"Godsent"	K. Cabugao	K. Cabugao	Jean-Paul Verona; Ben&Ben	4:38
12.	"Roots"	P. Guico	P. Guico	Jean-Paul Verona; Ben&Ben	3:14
13.	"Araw-Araw"	P. Guico; M. Guico	P. Guico; M. Guico	Jean-Paul Verona; Ben&Ben	5:14
Total length:					51:04

== Personnel ==
=== Ben&Ben ===
- Miguel Benjamin Guico – lead vocals, acoustic guitar
- Paol Benjamin Guico – lead vocals, acoustic guitar
- Poch Barretto – lead guitar
- Jam Villanueva – drums
- Agnes Reoma – bass
- Patricia Lasaten – keyboards
- Toni Muñoz – percussion, backing vocals
- Andrew de Pano – percussion, backing vocals
- Keifer Cabugao – violin, backing vocals

=== Additional personnel ===
- Ebe Dancel – co-lead vocals ("Baka Sakali")
- Nicolai Maybituin – creative director
- Jean Paul Verona – producer
- Johnoy Danao – producer
- Rene Serna – sound engineer

== Awards and nominations ==
Year	Award	Category	Result	Ref.
2020	Awit Awards 2020	Favorite Album of the Year	Won	
2021	12th PMPC Star Awards for Music	Folk/Country Recording of the Year (for Sampaguita)	Nominated	
2021	12th PMPC Star Awards for Music	Album of the Year	Nominated	

== Certification ==
Region	Certification	Certified units/sales
Philippines (PARI)	4× Platinum	60,000^{*}
^{*} Sales figures based on certification alone.

== See also ==
- Pagtingin
- Araw-Araw
