= Paninindigan Kita =

2025 single by Ben&Ben

Single by Ben&Ben
- Language: Tagalog
- English title: Stand By You
- Released: April 30, 2022
- Recorded: 2020
- Studio: Spryta Productions Inc. (Mandaluyong, Metro Manila)
- Length: 5:09
- Label: Sony Philippines
- Songwriters: Miguel Benjamin Guico; Paolo Benjamin Guico
- Producer: Jean-Paul Verona

Ben&Ben singles chronology
"Mag-ingat" (2022)	"Paninindigan Kita" (2022)	"Langyang Pag-Ibig" (2022)

"Paninindigan Kita" (lit. 'Stand By You') is a song by Filipino folk-pop band Ben&Ben. It was released as a digital single on April 30, 2022, through Sony Music Philippines. Written by lead vocalists and twins Paolo and Miguel Benjamin Guico, the track explains that an ode to a lover who may be hesitant to move forward in their relationship. The music video was directed by Niq Ablao, who previously worked with the band behind "Upuan", and features the band's keyboardist and bassist Pat Lasaten and Agnes Reoma, who are struggling with their feelings for each other and fighting against the odds to maintain their relationship.

The track has received many accolades, with winning Best Pop Recording and Music Video of the Year at the 34th Awit Awards, and Contemporary Folk Song of the Year at the 8th Wish Music Awards.

== Background and release ==
Ben&Ben released their new single, titled "Paninindigan Kita", and announced their first-ever North American tour, starting in September, with six stops.

The band had shared a brief video clip detailing the process of creating the cover art for their track. It was inspired by the couple and members of the band, Pat Lasaten and Agnes Reoma, and was made by Isobel Funk.

== Composition ==
The song is five minutes and nine seconds long, and was written by lead vocalists and twins Paolo and Miguel Benjamin Guico and produced by Jean-Paul Verona. The track explains that an ode to a lover who may be hesitant to move forward in their relationship. The track is also the band's first studio song since the COVID-19 pandemic began, and was recorded in 2020 at Spryta Productions Inc. in Mandaluyong, Metro Manila.

== Music video ==
Released on June 30, 2022, before the end of the Pride Month, the music video was directed by Niq Ablao, who previously worked with the band behind "Upuan", and features the band's keyboardist and bassist Pat Lasaten and Agnes Reoma, who are struggling with their feelings for each other and fighting against the odds to maintain their relationship. According to Ablao, the visual narrative follows Pat and Agnes' journey of standing up for love, regardless of gender, and their unwavering support. It highlights the struggles and challenges faced by the LGBTQ+ community, who often feel compelled to hide simple expressions of love.

According to the band's keyboardist Pat, she explained that she and her partner, the band's bassist Agnes, were both excited and nervous about their relationship due to their lack of public disclosure and reluctance to engage in physical intimacy. Agnes also expressed excitement about presenting the story to a wider audience, despite not being actors, as they are excited about the potential audience of queer kids.

== Other versions ==
The band has collaborated with Indonesian singer-songwriter Pamungkas for the English version of "Paninindigan Kita" (lit. 'Stand by You'). The performance video was released on the band's YouTube channel on August 12, 2022. Ben&Ben and Pamungkas have collaborated in-studio before co-headlining the show Gimme Shelter in Manila on August 6. The collaborations come amid preparations for the band's North American tour this year and Pamungkas' regional tour in support of his album, titled "Birdy".

== Credits and personnel ==
Credits are adapted from Apple Music.

- Ben&Ben – vocals
- Miguel Benjamin Guico – songwriter
- Paolo Benjamin Guico – songwriter
- Jean-Paul Verona – producer

== Awards and nominations ==
Awards and nominations for "Paninindigan Kita"
Year	Award	Category	Result	Ref.
2023	Awit Awards	Song of the Year	Nominated	(Note: Attributed to multiple references.)
2023	Awit Awards	Best Performance by a Group Recording Artist	Won (Note: Tied with Dilaw for "Uhaw"')	(Note: Attributed to multiple references.)
2023	Awit Awards	Best Pop Recording	Won	(Note: Attributed to multiple references.)
2023	Awit Awards	Best Traditional/Contemporary Folk Recording	Nominated	(Note: Attributed to multiple references.)
2023	Awit Awards	Music Video of the Year	Won	(Note: Attributed to multiple references.)
2023	Awit Awards	People's Choice for Favorite Song	Nominated	(Note: Attributed to multiple references.)
2023	Wish 107.5 Music Awards	Contemporary Folk Song of the Year	Won	
2024	Star Awards for Music	Song of the Year	Nominated	
