= Sa Susunod na Habang Buhay =

2020 single by Ben&Ben

Single by Ben&Ben
- Released: February 28, 2020
- Recorded: 2020
- Length: 4:48
- Label: Sony Philippines
- Songwriters: Paolo Benjamin Guico; Miguel Benjamin Guico
- Producers: Jean Paul Verona; Ben&Ben

Ben&Ben singles chronology
"Make It with You" (2019)	"Sa Susunod na Habang Buhay" (2020)	"Doors" (2020)

Music video
- "Sa Susunod na Habang Buhay" on YouTube

"Sa Susunod na Habang Buhay" (English: "In the Next Life Time") (Note: English translation provided by the Canadian Cinematography Awards.) is a song by the Filipino band Ben&Ben. It was released as a single on February 28, 2020, through Sony Music Philippines. Written by lead vocalists Paolo Benjamin Guico and Miguel Benjamin Guico, the track explores a romance that has faded, emphasizing the promise to love and choose one's beloved in another life.

The music video was directed by Jorel Lising, which depicts Kathryn Bernardo and Daniel Padilla of the KathNiel love team as a couple trapped in a time loop that resets after one dies, with one retaining memories from their past relationship. The track was featured as the theme song for the 2023 Filipino film Rewind.

The song and its music video received several awards and nominations, winning Best Ballad Recording at the 34th Awit Awards, Mellow Video of the Year at the Myx Music Awards in 2021, and Wishclusive Contemporary Folk Performance of the Year at the Wish Music Awards in 2022. Nearly four years after its release, the song peaked at number three on Billboard's Philippines Songs chart and number 66 on the Philippines Hot 100 in 2024.

== Background and release ==
The song was first performed at Bonifacio High Street Amphitheater on February 5, 2020. It was later released on February 28 as a standalone single on music streaming services. A few minutes after its release, Miguel shared on Twitter that he wept after writing the song, realizing it had healed a wound he had not known he carried, and he hoped others would experience the same healing.

== Composition ==
"Sa Susunod na Habang Buhay"
A sample of the song's chorus

The song was written by lead vocalists Paolo Benjamin Guico and Miguel Benjamin Guico and produced by Jean-Paul Verona and Ben&Ben. The mellow track explores a faded romance and the promise of eternal love that transcends lifetimes. It addresses common questions people often ask their partners, as it conveys the intricacies of navigating a complex relationship while maintaining an optimistic outlook.

== Music video ==
Released on December 14, 2020, the music video was directed by Jorel Lising and written by Juan Miguel Severo. Kathryn Bernardo and Daniel Padilla of the KathNiel love team played a couple trapped in a time loop that resets after one dies, with one retaining memories from their past relationship. The music video opens in a scene interrupted by the rumbling sea and the crashing waves on the shore. While the forces of nature work to retract the water that clings to the sandbar, Bernardo and Padilla walk together against a vibrant pink and orange backdrop. Despite their backs turned, they appear calm and content, a visual that aligns with the song's opening narration. The story ends without a clear resolution, as Bernardo and Padilla face an unresolved emotional situation within the narrative.

Lead vocalist Miguel described the music video as "a dream and a serendipitous sequence of events" that began when the band freely allowed Severo to use their song "Ride Home" for his Gaya Sa Pelikula series. Severo returned the favor by offering to write the script and pitching it to Bernardo and Padilla, who agreed to take part in the music video despite their busy schedules.

== Reception ==
Upon its release, "Sa Susunod na Habang-Buhay" drew notable responses from listeners, with Rappler describing the release as generating significant "feels". Angelo De Cartagena of Nylon Manila praised the song and described Kathryn Bernardo and Daniel Padilla's performance in the music video as "their most grown up yet". The music video gained over 2 million views in its first two days of release.

== Accolades ==
Awards and nominations for "Sa Susunod na Habang Buhay"
Award	Year	Category	Result	Ref.
34th Awit Awards	2021	Best Ballad Recording	Won	
34th Awit Awards	2021	Best Traditional/Contemporary Folk Recording	Nominated	
34th Awit Awards	2021	Best Engineered Recording	Nominated	
Myx Music Awards 2021	2021	Mellow Video of the Year	Won	
Myx Music Awards 2021	2021	Music Video of the Year	Nominated	
Canadian Cinematography Awards	2021	Best Music Video	Won	
Canadian Cinematography Awards	2021	Best Music Video Cinematography	Won	
Canadian Cinematography Awards	2021	Best Song	Won	
Wish 107.5 Music Awards	2022	Wishclusive Contemporary Folk Performance of the Year	Won	

== Personnel ==
According to Apple Music

- Ben&Ben – vocals, producer
- Miguel Benjamin Guico – songwriter
- Paolo Benjamin Guico – songwriter
- Jean-Paul Verona – producer

== Charts ==
=== Weekly charts ===
Weekly chart performance for "Sa Susunod na Habang Buhay"
Chart (2024)	Peak position
Philippines (Billboard)	3
Philippines (Philippines Hot 100)	66

=== Year-end charts ===
Year-end chart performance for "Sa Susunod na Habang Buhay"
Chart (2024)	Position
Philippines (Philippines Hot 100)	33
Philippines (Top Philippine Songs)	21

== Use in other media ==
"Sa Susunod na Habang Buhay" was the official theme song of the 2023 Filipino film Rewind.
