= Pagtingin =

2019 song by Filipino folk-pop band Ben&Ben

Single by Ben&Ben

from the album Limasawa Street
- Released: May 2, 2019
- Recorded: 2019
- Studio: Spryta Productions Inc. (Mandaluyong, Metro Manila)
- Genre: Folk-pop
- Length: 3:46
- Label: Sindikato; Sony Music Philippines
- Songwriter: Paolo Benjamin Guico
- Producers: Ben&Ben; Jean Paul Verona

Ben&Ben singles chronology
"Mitsa (Salamat)" (2019)	"Pagtingin" (2019)	"Araw-Araw" (2019)

Music video
- "Pagtingin" on YouTube

Audio sample
- file; help

"Pagtingin" (English: "The Way We Feel") is a song by Filipino folk-pop band Ben&Ben, composed by lead vocalist Paolo Benjamin Guico. It was released alongside "Araw-Araw" on May 2, 2019. It was used for the film LSS (Last Song Syndrome) released in 2019 under Globe Studios.

== Music video ==
The music video of the song was directed by Jorel Lising, with appearances from Gabbi Garcia and Khalil Ramos and was released on July 19, 2019. A sequel to the music video, "Araw-Araw", was released two months later on September 28, 2019. It was revealed by the band that the guitar solo during the break, performed by lead guitarist Poch Baretto and vocalist-guitarist Miguel Benjamin Guico, was recorded as they were filming the music video.

The music video is considered the most viewed video on the band's YouTube channel with over 21 million views since its release.

== Appearances in media and covers ==
- Gabbi Garcia and Khalil Ramos performed their rendition of the song in the Wish bus in September 2019.
- Moira Dela Torre and Ben&Ben performed the song on ASAP Natin 'To on September 8, 2019.
- Regine Velasquez-Alcasid performed her rendition of the song on her virtual benefit concert on April 22, 2020.
- Ben&Ben themselves performed their metal rock rendition of the song on their BBTV episode on the band's YouTube channel on August 12, 2020.
- On their virtual performance in the 33rd Awit Awards in August 2020, Gary Valenciano and Ben&Ben performed a mashup of "Pagtingin" and Valenciano's "Di Bale Na Lang".
- Ben&Ben performed the song on the 28th episode of the third season of Everybody, Sing!, in which it was used as the song for the group of 100 Band Members' game The ChooSing One on October 1, 2023.

== Aftermath ==
A comment from the music video, posted some time after its upload on YouTube, would become the sole basis for the composition of their 2020 single "Lifetime."

== Awards and nominations ==
Year	Award	Category	Result	Ref.
2020	5th Wish Music Awards	Wishclusive Urban Performance of the Year	Won	
2020	15th Myx Music Awards	Mellow Video of the Year	Nominated	
2020	15th Myx Music Awards	Song of the Year	Nominated	
2020	33rd Awit Awards	Best Performance by a Group Recording Artist	Won	
2020	33rd Awit Awards	Favorite Song of the Year	Won	
2021	12th PMPC Star Awards for Music	Song of the Year	Nominated	
2021	12th PMPC Star Awards for Music	Duo/Group Artist of the Year	Won	
