= 2020 Tarlac shooting =

Fatal police shooting in the Philippines

- A still image of a video taken by one of the victims' relatives showing Nuezca (right) trying to arrest Frank (center) while his mother Sonia (left) is shielding him, moments before Nuezca fatally shoots both Frank and Sonia.
- Location: Paniqui, Tarlac, Philippines
- Date: December 20, 2020; 5 years ago 5:10 p.m. (PhST)
- Target: Sonya Rufino Gregorio and Frank Anthony Gregorio
- Attack type: Shooting; Double murder
- Weapon: Beretta 92
- Deaths: 2
- Perpetrator: Jonel Nuezca
- Motive: Dispute over the usage of a noisemaker; Preexisting conflicts over right of way
- Charges: Double murder
- Verdict: Guilty
- Convictions: Reclusión perpetua (40 years imprisonment) for each count of murder, ₱952,560 payment to the victims' family
- Convicted: Jonel Nuezca

On December 20, 2020, a shooting incident occurred in Paniqui, Tarlac, Philippines, when a police officer, Jonel Nuezca, fatally shot two of his neighbors, Sonia and Frank Gregorio, after a heated argument over an improvised noisemaker (boga). The victims' relatives and the perpetrator's underage daughter were present at the scene of the crime and witnessed the incident. The incident was caught on camera and went viral on social media, sparking nationwide outrage and reigniting the discussion over police brutality and human rights violations in recent years.

== Background ==
According to World Population Review, data from 2020 shows that the Philippines ranked third among the countries with the highest cases of police killings with 3,451 have been recorded after Brazil and Venezuela.

== People involved ==
=== Jonel Nuezca ===
Jonel Montales Nuezca (October 17, 1974 – November 30, 2021) was a native of Urdaneta, Pangasinan, but resided in Barangay Cabayaoasan, Paniqui, Tarlac. He had been previously charged with two homicide cases and multiple administrative cases. Based on a document retrieved from PRO III Chief P/Brig. Gen. Val de Leon, Nuezca was also suspended for 10 days from his job from February 19 to 28, 2010. In 2013, Nuezca faced an administrative case for grave misconduct, which was later dropped. In 2014, a "less serious neglect of duty" case was filed against Nuezca for allegedly refusing to take a drug test. He was subsequently suspended for 31 days. In 2016, Nuezca was charged with "serious neglect of duty" for allegedly not attending a court hearing as a prosecution witness in a drug case; the case was also dropped and closed. Nuezca was later charged with two serious misconduct and homicide cases in May and December 2019, both of which were dismissed due to "lack of substantial evidence".

=== Sonia and Frank Anthony "Anton" Gregorio ===
Sonia Rufino Gregorio (Note: News outlets spelled her name as "Sonya", while the Gregorio family spelled it as "Sonia". Moreover, news outlets indicated that her age was 52 years old but according to the tarpaulin on display, she was born on February 26, 1965, therefore, she was 55 years old at the time of her death.) (February 26, 1965 – December 20, 2020) was 55 years old and her son, Frank Anthony Gregorio, (September 10, 1995 – December 20, 2020) was 25 years old at the time of their deaths. Both were residents of Barangay Cabayaoasan, Paniqui, Tarlac.

== Incident and investigation ==
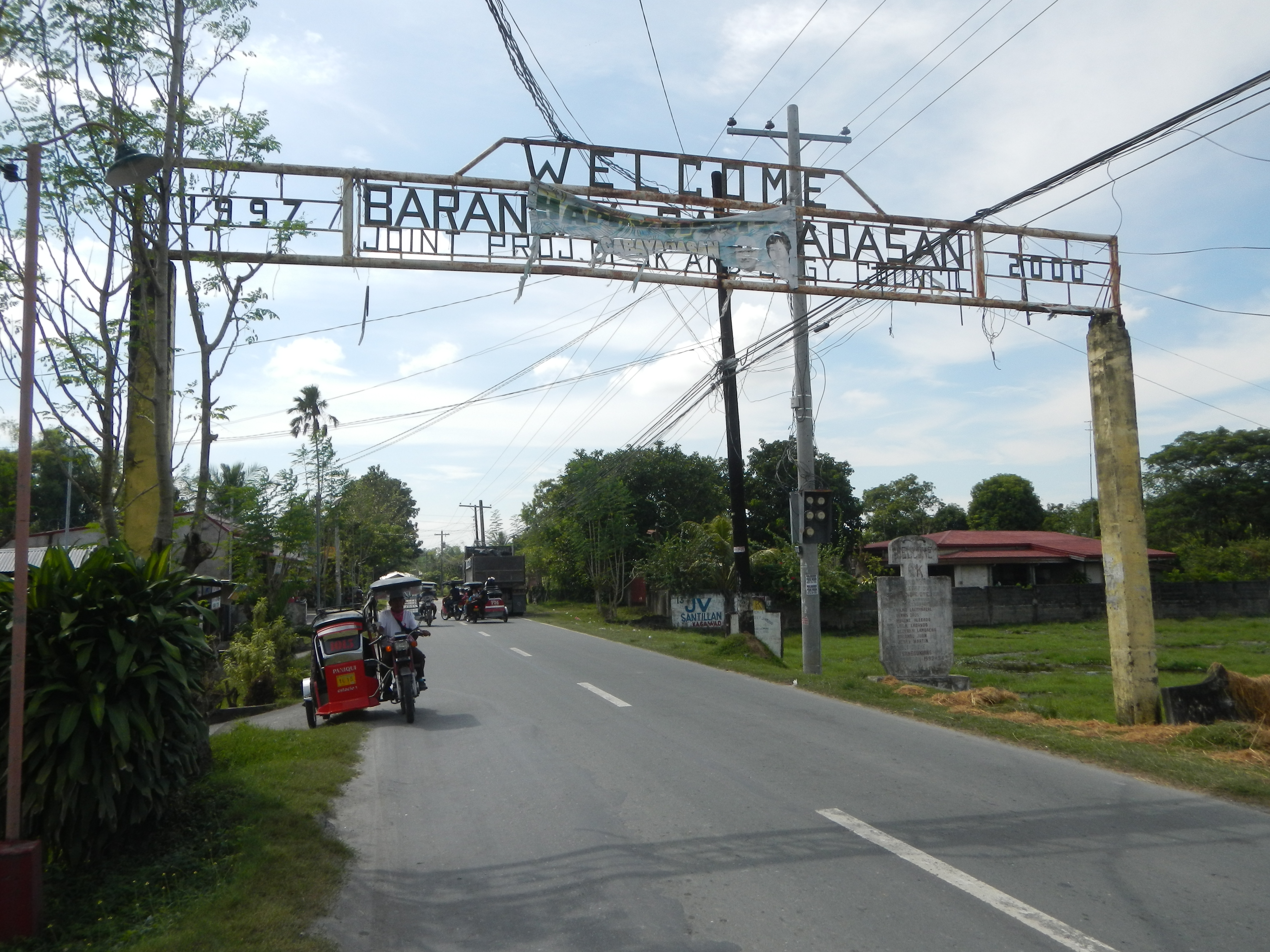
Barangay Cabayaoasan in Paniqui, where the shooting incident took place

The incident began when Nuezca confronted the Gregorio family for using a boga, an improvised noisemaker cannon typically made from bamboo, a PVC pipe, or through linkage of opened tin cans. When Nuezca attempted to arrest Frank Anthony "Anton" Gregorio, who appeared intoxicated, his mother, 52-year-old Sonia Gregorio, intervened by restraining her son. The confrontation escalated into a heated argument, culminating in Nuezca fatally shooting both victims. According to Police Colonel Renante Cabico, director of the Tarlac Provincial Police Office, Nuezca was off duty at the time of the incident.

The circumstances of the incident was captured on video. It shows Nuezca, in civilian clothes, accompanied by his 12-year-old daughter, rushing to the Gregorio family's house. Nuezca was holding the boga he had confiscated. Sonia is seen embracing Frank in an attempt to prevent his arrest. Bystanders can be heard pleading and crying in the background. At one point, the police told the people not to interfere and wait for the barangay officials. Elisha Aquino Nuezca, also at the scene and intervened by yelling "My father is a policeman!" to which Sonia mockingly responded "I don't care, eh-eh-eh-eh-eh!", quoting a lyric from the K-pop song "I Don't Care" by South Korean girl group 2NE1 which Sandara Park was a member. Nuezca then threatened to kill Sonia by saying “Putang-ina mo, gusto mo tapusin kita ngayon, ha?!” (transl. 'You motherfucker, do you want me to end you right now, huh?!') right before shooting her in the head. He proceeded to shoot Frank twice before firing at Sonia again as she lay on the ground, all in front of his daughter and the victims' relatives. According to the Paniqui Municipal Police, Nuezca fled the scene and went to his parents' house in Urdaneta, Pangasinan. Nuezca had been assigned to the Parañaque City Crime Laboratory and had recently returned to Paniqui, Tarlac.

The incident was reported to the police twenty minutes later and, at 6:19 p.m., Nuezca surrendered himself to a police station in Rosales, Pangasinan where he turned over his firearms. The following day, Lt. Col. Noriel Rombaoa, chief of Paniqui Municipal Police Station, confirmed that Nuezca admitted to the crime. Nuezca was subsequently charged with double murder. The Philippine National Police (PNP) assured that there would be no "whitewashing" in the investigation and committed to resolving the case within 30 days. They stated that if found guilty, Nuezca would be dismissed from service and stripped of his income.

Relatives of the victims reported that prior to the shooting, Nuezca had an intense ongoing dispute with the family over a right of way he had sold to them.

== Reactions ==
=== Social media ===
A day after the incident, numerous netizens and celebrities condemned the killings on social media with the hashtags #StopTheKillingsPH, #PulisAngTerorista ("Police are the Terrorists"), #EndPoliceBrutality and #JusticeForSonyaGregorio dominating on Twitter in the Philippines, as well as in Singapore and Dubai.

Personal information, including photos of Elisha Nuezca, also circulated on social media. This caused UNICEF Philippines to issue a public advisory to discourage the spread of such information on social media where Elisha has been "repeatedly vilified and verbally abused".

=== Government ===
Interior Secretary Eduardo Año condemned the incident, vowing the government would file the criminal cases against Nuezca. Año also added that the incident should not lead the condemnation of the entire police. Presidential Spokesperson Harry Roque said that President Rodrigo Duterte, who supports the police under his administration, will not protect Nuezca because of his crimes. Duterte himself watched the viral video of the shooting. Senator Bong Go said that Duterte was angered at the incident. Malacañang vowed to bring justice for the victims of the shooting. On the same day, Duterte ordered the PNP to make sure that the suspect face punishment. The president characterized Nuezca as "sick in the head". Duterte added that he will not condone police officers who commit such crimes. Police Captain Ariel Buraga of Bato, Catanduanes was relieved from duty after he commented on social media justifying the shooting of the Gregorios.

On December 22, PNP Chief Debold Sinas personally visited the wake of the Gregorios.

=== Politics ===
Lawmakers from both the Senate and the House of Representatives condemned the killing of mother-and-son. House Speaker Lord Allan Velasco expressed sympathy to the victims and said that Nuezca must be punished. Senator Franklin Drilon stated that the suspect should "spend Christmas and a lifetime in jail" and called the incident "pure evil." Senator Leila de Lima was angered over the incident, calling it "appalling and shocking" while adding Duterte's name in her statement. Senator Kiko Pangilinan said the incident was "infuriating". Other senators condemned the incident, including Risa Hontiveros, Nancy Binay and Joel Villanueva. Senator Panfilo Lacson, who is a former Philippine National Police (PNP) chief, condemned the shooting and called the police to hold Nuezca responsible. The police called the incident an "isolated case." On the other hand, Senators Ronald dela Rosa, also a former PNP chief, Bong Revilla, and Manny Pacquiao considered the "reinstitution of the death penalty." Dela Rosa also expressed belief that Nuezca is a "drug addict" because of the latter's refusal to do the drug testing. Meanwhile, ACT Teachers Representative France Castro and GABRIELA Representative Arlene Brosas directly blamed Duterte for the crime, citing human rights violations committed under Duterte administration. Senators Joel Villanueva, Sonny Angara, Nancy Binay, Grace Poe, Migz Zubiri and Sherwin Gatchalian filed Senate Resolution No. 600 that probes into the recent killings in the country under Duterte's administration. Vice President Leni Robredo slammed the culture of impunity following the shooting.

=== Protests ===
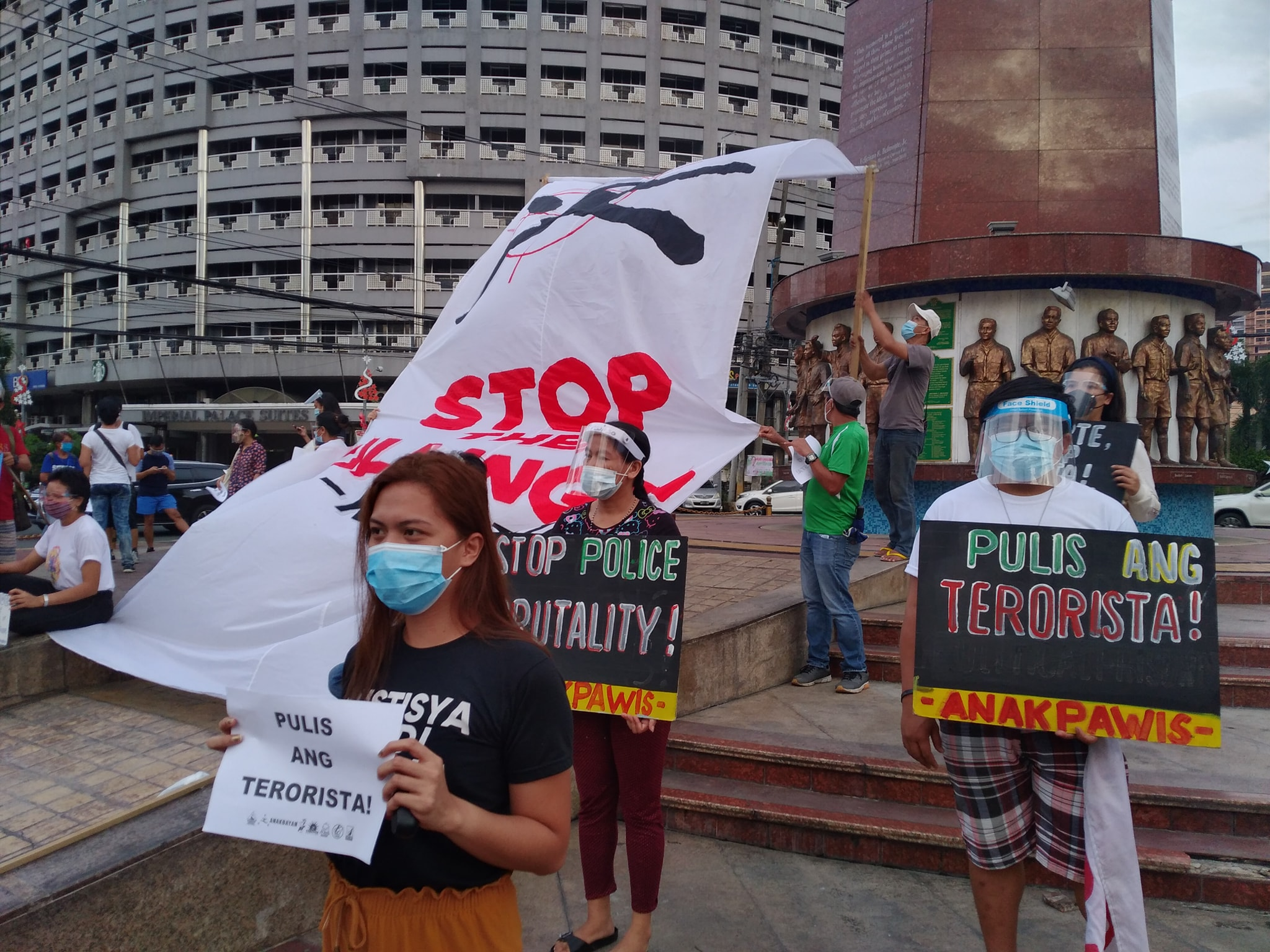
Indignation rally in response to Tarlac shooting incident, December 21, 2020, Boy Scout Circle, Quezon City.

An indignation rally was done by numerous groups on December 21, 2020, at the Boy Scout Circle, Quezon City.

=== Religious groups ===
Tarlac Bishop Enrique Macaraeg condemned the shooting and added that God promises justice "even if sometimes justice on earth is hard to find."

== Aftermath ==
A wake for the two victims was held a day after the incident. Personnel of the Commission of Human Rights from the region visited the wake. Former senator Jinggoy Estrada also visited the wake. Twelve members of the Gregorio family who witnessed the murder of the mother-and-son were subjected to counseling. While being detained, Nuezca issued an apology for his crimes but the Gregorio family did not accept the apology. The mother-and-son were buried on December 27, 2020.

On January 10, 2021, Nuezca pleaded not guilty to his charges. The PNP dismissed Nuezca from his duty the following day. On August 26, 2021, Nuezca was found guilty by the Paniqui Regional Trial Court. He was sentenced to reclusión perpetua for each count of murder and owing the victims' family a ₱952,560 fine.

On November 30, 2021, Nuezca died while in captivity at the New Bilibid Prison in Muntinlupa, Metro Manila, at the age of 47 after he collapsed while walking outside his dormitory building. His death, the cause of which was found to be a heart attack, was confirmed by the Bureau of Corrections the following day. Nuezca was later buried in Urdaneta City Memorial Park on December 5, 2021.

== In popular culture ==
The case was featured on GMA Network's investigative docudrama program Imbestigador in an episode entitled "Gregorio Double Murder Case". Jonel Nuezca was portrayed by Carlos Agassi, while Sonia and Anton Gregorio were portrayed by Mel Kimura and Martin del Rosario, respectively.

On December 22, 2020, Filipino folk-pop band Ben&Ben wrote the song "Kapangyarihan" (English: power), which was posted on Facebook, and issued a statement on the killing on Twitter. The song would eventually become part of their second album, Pebble House, Vol. 1: Kuwaderno, with additional lyrics by Filipino boy band SB19, released in August 2021, the same time Nuezca was found guilty.
