= Nine (Ben&Ben album) =

Compilation album by Ben&Ben
- Released: September 24, 2026
- Recorded: 2026
- Length: 44:45
- Label: Sony Music
- Producer: Poch Barretto

Ben&Ben chronology
The Traveller Across Dimensions (2024)	Nine (2026)

Nine is the first compilation album by Filipino folk-pop band Ben&Ben. It was released on September 24, 2026, under Sony Music Philippines, as the band celebrated its ninth anniversary. The album features reimagined versions of songs from the band's earlier releases, along with the previously released song "Saranggola" (lit. 'Kite').

== Background ==
Nine followed The Traveller Across Dimensions, Ben&Ben's third studio album, which was released on November 29, 2024, through Sony Music Philippines. The album was a concept album that followed the story of Liwanag (transl. Light), a traveller who journeys through three dimensions representing different stages of life. It contained 13 tracks, including the singles "Could Be Something", "Autumn", "Courage", "Comets", and "Triumph".

In 2026, Ben&Ben began working on reimagined versions of songs from their earlier catalogue. The project started with "Lifetime (Reimagined)", which was not initially intended to become part of an anthology. After the release of the song, the band recorded more reimagined versions, which eventually became Nine. In September, the album was announced as part of Ben&Ben's ninth anniversary. It was released on September 24 through Sony Music. The band described the reimagined songs as recordings that reflect how its members and their music had changed over the years. Paolo Benjamin said that the group wanted to let the older songs "grow up" with them and reflect the experiences they had gained since the band's formation.

== Music ==
The album contains reimagined versions of "Ride Home", "Maybe the Night", "Sunrise", "Doors", "Autumn", "Lifetime", and "Leaves". It also includes "Saranggola", which was previously released, and "Harinawa", a new song written and completed in 2026. "Maybe the Night (Reimagined)" is the album's focus track. The original "Maybe the Night" was first arranged by the nine members during a 2017 session in drummer Jam Villanueva's attic. According to bassist Agnes Reoma, it was the first song the group worked on together from start to finish as a nine-member band.

The band drew on its years of performing together when producing the reimagined recordings. Poch Barretto said that the group wanted to bring the energy and musical chemistry of its live performances into the studio while retaining the refinements of a studio recording. The album closes with "Harinawa", which was written and completed during the band's ninth year. The song was described by the band as carrying a message of hope and positivity and as a reflection of what may come next for the group.

== Production ==
Poch Barretto led the full production of Nine. The band also worked with longtime collaborator Jean-Paul "JP" Verona and producer Ziv on the reimagined recordings. Luke and Eo contributed drums to songs recorded while Jam Villanueva was recovering from an injury. Villanueva's departure from Ben&Ben was also announced as part of the band's 2026 activities, making Nine her final project with the group.

== Release ==
Ben&Ben held a listening party for Nine on September 23, 2026, at Nami Cafe in Quezon City. Members of the media, guests, and fans from the band's fanbase, Liwanag, attended the event. The band discussed the songs and the stories behind the album. Nine was released by Sony Music on September 24. It was the band's final album with Jam Villanueva as the drummer. The band was scheduled to perform at Saranggola: The Concert on October 2, 2026, at the Smart Araneta Coliseum in Quezon City.

== Track listing ==
The track listing and song durations are based on the album's listing on Apple Music.

Nine
No.	Title	Original release	Length
1.	"9"		0:47
2.	"Ride Home (Reimagined)"	Ben&Ben EP	4:46
3.	"Maybe the Night (Reimagined)"		5:04
4.	"Autumn (Reimagined)"	The Traveller Across Dimensions	3:56
5.	"Doors (Reimagined)"		7:25
6.	"Sunrise (Reimagined)"		3:33
7.	"Lifetime (Reimagined)"		4:38
8.	"Leaves (Reimagined)"	Ben&Ben EP	6:06
9.	"Saranggola"		4:26
10.	"Harinawa"		4:04
Total length:			44:45

== Personnel ==
The personnel and production credits are based on the album credits and published reports about the recording of Nine.

=== Ben&Ben ===
- Paolo Benjamin Guico – lead vocals, acoustic guitar
- Miguel Benjamin Guico – lead vocals, acoustic guitar
- Poch Barretto – lead guitar, backing vocals
- Jam Villanueva – drums
- Agnes Reoma – bass
- Patricia Lasaten – keyboards
- Toni Muñoz – percussion, vocals
- Andrew de Pano – percussion, vocals
- Keifer Cabugao – violin, vocals

=== Additional musicians ===
- Luke – drums
- Eo – drums

=== Production ===
- Poch Barretto – producer
- Jean-Paul Verona – additional production
- Ziv – additional production

=== Visuals ===
- Sara Erasmo – photography and visual art
