= Saranggola (song) =

2025 single by Ben&Ben

Single by Ben&Ben

from the album Nine
- Language: Filipino
- English title: Kite
- Released: April 11, 2025
- Length: 4:26
- Label: Sony Philippines
- Songwriters: Miguel Benjamin Guico; Paolo Benjamin Guico; Pat Lasaten; Agnes Reoma; Jam Villanueva; Toni Muñoz; Andrew de Pano; Keifer Cabugao
- Lyricists: Miguel Benjamin Guico; Paolo Benjamin Guico
- Producer: Ziv

Ben&Ben singles chronology
"Triumph" (2024)	"Saranggola" (2025)	"Alay Kapwa" (2025)

"Saranggola" (lit. 'Kite') is a song by Filipino folk-pop band Ben&Ben. It was released as a digital single on April 11, 2025, through Sony Music Philippines. Band members and twins Paolo and Miguel Benjamin Guico wrote the track and composed it with the rest of the band. Produced by Ziv, "Saranggola" explores themes of nostalgia, emotional connection, and change, it reflects cherished moments with friends and acknowledging the inevitable growth apart.

Their concert, titled Saranggola: The Concert, was held at the Araneta Coliseum on October 2, 2026, and will soon be held at SM Seaside Cebu Arena on April 10, 2027.

== Background and release ==
Thee band announced the release of their song on April 3, 2025, which was initially teased through a short video of them singing it together, and it centers around friendship. "Saranggola" was released on April 11, accompanied by a lyric video. It serves as the band's first release since their third album, The Traveller Across Dimensions, which was released on November 29, 2024.

== Composition ==
"Saranggola" is four minutes and twenty-six seconds long, composed in the key of C with a time signature of 4/4, and has a tempo of 99 beats per minute. Band members and twins Paolo and Miguel Benjamin Guico wrote the track and composed it with the rest of the band. Produced by Ziv, the track explores themes of nostalgia, emotional connection, and change, it reflects cherished moments with friends and acknowledging the inevitable growth apart. "Saranggola" marks the band's return to form, reminiscent of their earlier works but infused with their artistic depth and growth over the years. The band utilized a minimalist approach to release their single, featuring an acoustic guitar, cajon, and nine members singing in unison, gradually building into a guitar-driven jam.

The song, initially interpreted as friends leaving, "Saranggola’y lilipad sa kahel na kalangitan, paalam na nga ba sa ating nakaraan?" (lit. '"A kite flies in the orange sky, is it really goodbye to our past?"') is a love letter to those who choose to remain, as the band explains in their conversation that while it grieves the march of time, it also expresses love for those who choose to stay.

== Usage in media ==
In 2025, the song debuted in an episode of Pinoy Big Brother: Celebrity Collab Edition. That same year, the song was set to be featured in the upcoming deluxe edition of The Traveller Across Dimensions; however, it was added to the track list of their 2026 compilation album Nine instead.

In 2026, the song was used as the main theme for the 2026 revival of the youth-oriented public affairs debate program Y Speak.

== Accolades ==
Award	Year	Category	Result	Ref.
Filipino Music Awards	2025	Folk Song of the Year	Nominated	

== Credits and personnel ==
Credits are adapted from Apple Music.

- Ben&Ben – vocals
- Paolo Benjamin Guico – composer, lyrics
- Miguel Benjamin Guico – composer, lyrics
- Pat Lasaten – composer
- Agnes Reoma – composer
- Jam Villanueva – composer
- Toni Muñoz – composer
- Andrew de Pano – composer
- Keifer Cabugao – composer
- Poch Barretto – arranger
- Ziv – producer
- Rene Serna – engineer
- Jacques Jenkins – mixing engineer
- Luna Tebbs – mastering engineer
- Spryta Studios – recording engineer
