= Round Festival =

Annual music festival involving Southeast Asian and South Korean artists

ROUND Festival
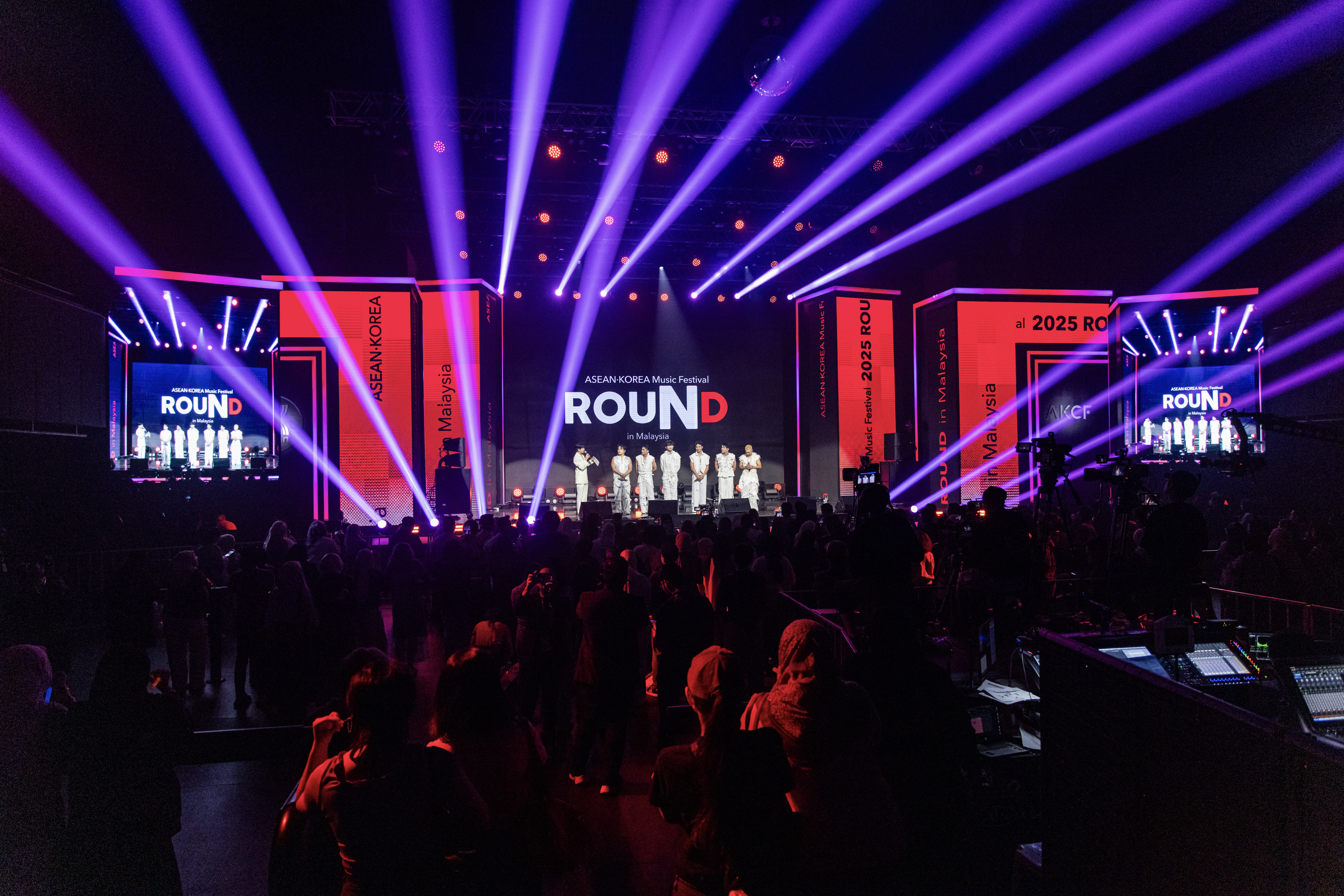
- ROUND Festival in 2025
- Frequency: Annually
- Years active: 2020–present
- Inaugurated: December 6, 2020 in Seoul, South Korea
- Previous event: April 18–19, 2026 in Quezon City, Philippines
- Next event: November 7–8, 2026 in Incheon, South Korea
- Organizer: KBS World
- Sponsor: ASEAN-Korea Cooperation Fund
- Website: https://roundfestival.net/

The ASEAN–Korea Music Festival (AKMF), branded as the ROUND Festival, is an annual music festival that features performances from artists from South Korea and eleven member nations of the Association of Southeast Asian Nations (ASEAN) (namely Brunei, Cambodia, Indonesia, Laos, Malaysia, Myanmar, the Philippines, Singapore, Thailand, Timor-Leste and Vietnam), with each nation taking turns in hosting the event. Organized and presented by KBS World, the festival aims to promote cultural exchanges between South Korea and ASEAN countries through the medium of popular music.

The first edition of the festival was held virtually on December 6, 2020, with its first in-person edition held in Jakarta, Indonesia from October 21 to 22, 2023. The latest edition of the festival was held in Quezon City, Philippines from April 18 to 19, 2026.

== Background ==
The ROUND Festival is organized and presented by KBS World, the international broadcasting division of the Korean Broadcasting System (KBS), the national public broadcaster of South Korea. It is also supported by ASEAN and the Ministry of Foreign Affairs of South Korea.

The event is sponsored by the ASEAN-Korea Cooperation Fund, a fund established by ASEAN and the government of South Korea aimed to foster regional cooperation between ASEAN and South Korea by advancing sustainable and inclusive development across ASEAN member nations, as well as enhancing people-to-people connectivity through education, cultural exchange and tourism, and strengthening economic resilience and digital transformation in member states, among other objectives.

The first two editions of the festival, held in 2020 and 2021, were organized online due to the COVID-19 pandemic in South Korea and in Southeast Asia, with the 2021 festival being delayed until January 2022. According to KBS World director Lee Han-sol, the COVID-19 pandemic also caused a planned in-person edition of the inaugural 2020 festival to be scrapped, which was originally scheduled to be held in Manila, Philippines. Its first in-person festival was later held in October 2023, hosted in Jakarta, Indonesia at Beach City International Stadium. Since then, editions of the ROUND Festival are hosted in nations that hold the position of chairmanship of ASEAN in their respective years.

== Broadcast ==
KBS World has also broadcast the festival worldwide through its television channel and on YouTube, where the recorded telecast would be split into two parts broadcast in separate days. Previously, the festival was broadcast in South Korea on KBS1.

KBS World's organization and broadcast of the inaugural 2020 festival won the 2021 Digital Content Award from the Asia-Pacific Broadcasting Union (ABU).

== Editions ==
Year	Date(s)	Host country	Host city	Venue	Host(s)	No. of artists	Ref.
2020	December 6	South Korea	Seoul	Nodeul Island Live House (Note: Held online with live and pre-recorded content due to the COVID-19 pandemic.)	none	20	
2021	January 9, 2022	South Korea	Chuncheon	Chuncheon Performing Arts Theater	Yoon Sang	15	
2023	October 21–22	Indonesia	Jakarta	Beach City International Stadium	Ji Hyun-woo	18	
2024	July 6–7	South Korea	Busan	KBS Busan Hall	BamBam	17	
2024	November 2–3	Laos	Vientiane	National Convention Centre	BamBam	13	
2025	June 21–22	Malaysia	Kuala Lumpur	Zepp Kuala Lumpur	Paul Kim	14	
2026	April 18–19	Philippines	Quezon City	Araneta Coliseum	10cm and Gabbi Garcia	17	
2026	November 7–8	South Korea	Incheon	Namdong Gymnasium	10cm	15	

== Line-ups ==
ROUND Festival line-ups by year
Year	Performer(s)											Ref.
Year	Brunei	Cambodia	Indonesia	Laos	Malaysia	Myanmar	Philippines	Singapore	Thailand	Vietnam	South Korea	Ref.
2020	Dila Junaidi	Smallworld Smallband	Isyana Sarasvati	Aluna Thavonsouk	Zamaera	Thar Dee Lu	Ben&Ben	Charlie Lim	Gam Wichayanee	Vũ. & Skylines Beyond Our Reach	Daybreak, Hoppipolla, Song So-hee & Second Moon, Soran, Elaine, George, Sunwoo Jung-a, Jamie, Leenalchi, 10cm	
2021	Dila with the Stars	Kesorrr	Barasuara	Taiy Akard	Sophia Liana	— (Note: Burmese singer-songwriter Wai La was supposed to perform at the 2021 festival as the sole Burmese representative, but the pre-recording of his performance was delayed due to the Myanmar civil war and could not be completed in time for the festival. As a result, Myanmar did not have a representative at the 2021 festival.)	SB19	Linying	Two Popetorn	Mỹ Anh	Jambinai, Adoy, Sam Kim, Peppertones, Lucy, N.Flying	
2023	Dila Aisyah & TheBoys	One Peace Band	Isyana Sarasvati, Barasuara, Pamungkas, Ardhito Pramono	Black Eyes	Gerhana Skacinta	Velocity x Jewel	SB19	brb.	ASIA7	Pháo	SURL, Jimmy Brown, Se So Neon, Galaxy Express, SGO	
2024 (Busan)	Rizal Rasid	Chet Kanhchna	Nogei	Thinlamphone	Masdo	Bunny Phyoe	Zack Tabudlo, Josh Cullen	Jasmine Sokko	Television Off	Tiên Tiên	Touched, Nerd Connection, H1-Key, Kim Yuna, Nell, BamBam	
2024 (Vientiane)	Rizal Rasid	Chet Kanhchna	Nogei	Black Eyes, Taiy Akard	Masdo	Bunny Phyoe	Kaia	Club Mild	Dept	Tiên Tiên	Nell, BamBam	
2025	The Pujanggas	Tep Boprek	Yan Josua	Thay Champasak	Dolla, Marsha Milan	He' Lay	1st.One	Yung Raja	Retrospect	Minh Tốc & Lam	Dragon Pony, Paul Kim, Touched	
2026 (Quezon City)	Syafiq Abdillah	G-Devith	Pamungkas	JoJo Miracle	Mimifly	Velocity	Hori7on, Cup of Joe, Ben&Ben, TJ Monterde Project P-Pop: Rising (Note: Special collaborative supergroup featuring P-pop music groups 1st.One, Hori7on, and Kaia.)	Regina Song	Tilly Birds	Chillies	10cm, MeloMance	
2026 (Incheon)	Fakhrul Razi	La Cima	Eastern Indonesian Collective	Bigpom	Hael Husaini	Velocity	Kaia, TJ Monterde	Gen Neo	Tilly Birds	Marzuz	10cm, Lee Seung-yoon, Lee Young-ji, Roy Kim	

== Gallery ==
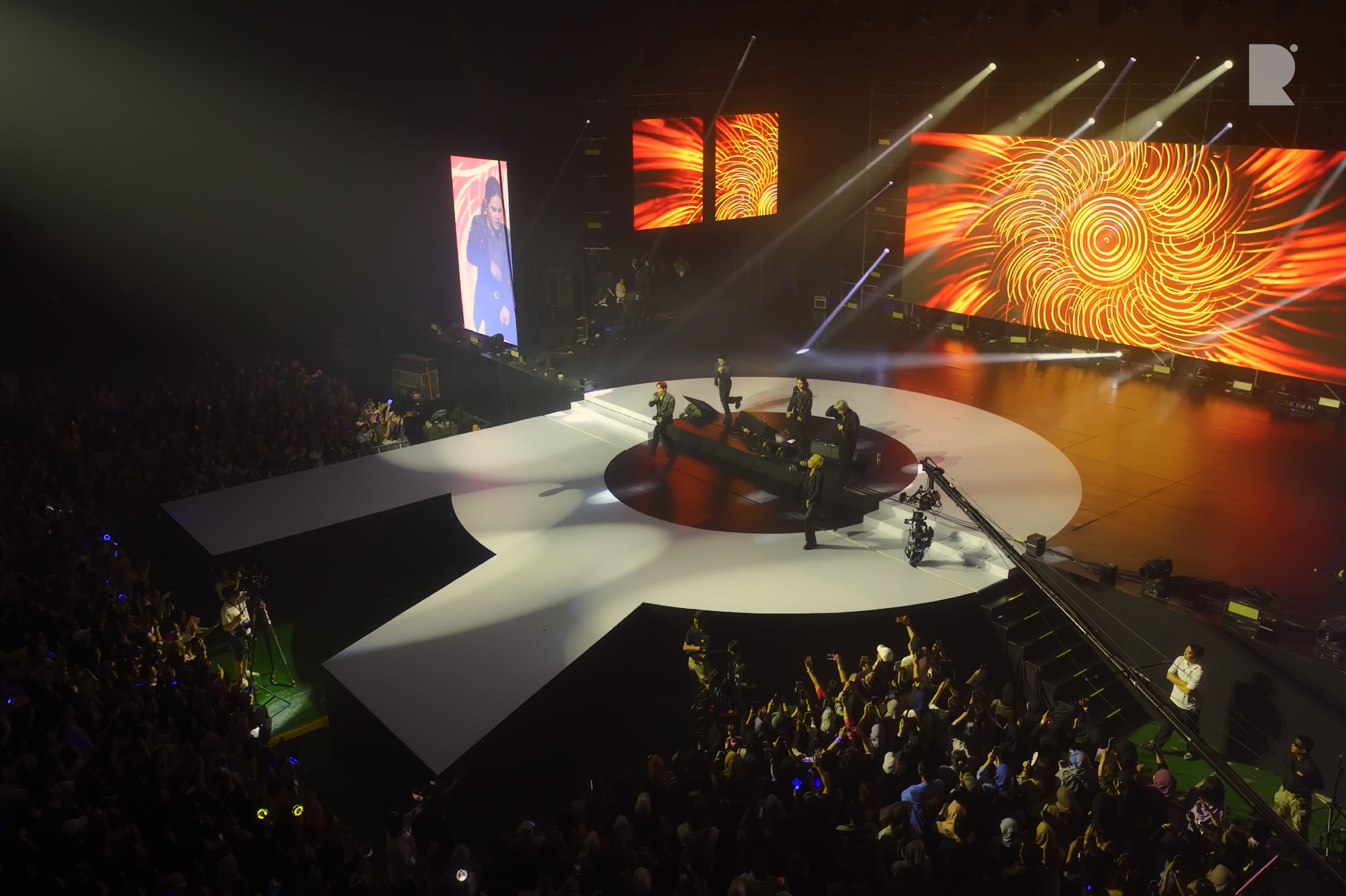
A live performance at the ROUND Festival in Jakarta (2023).

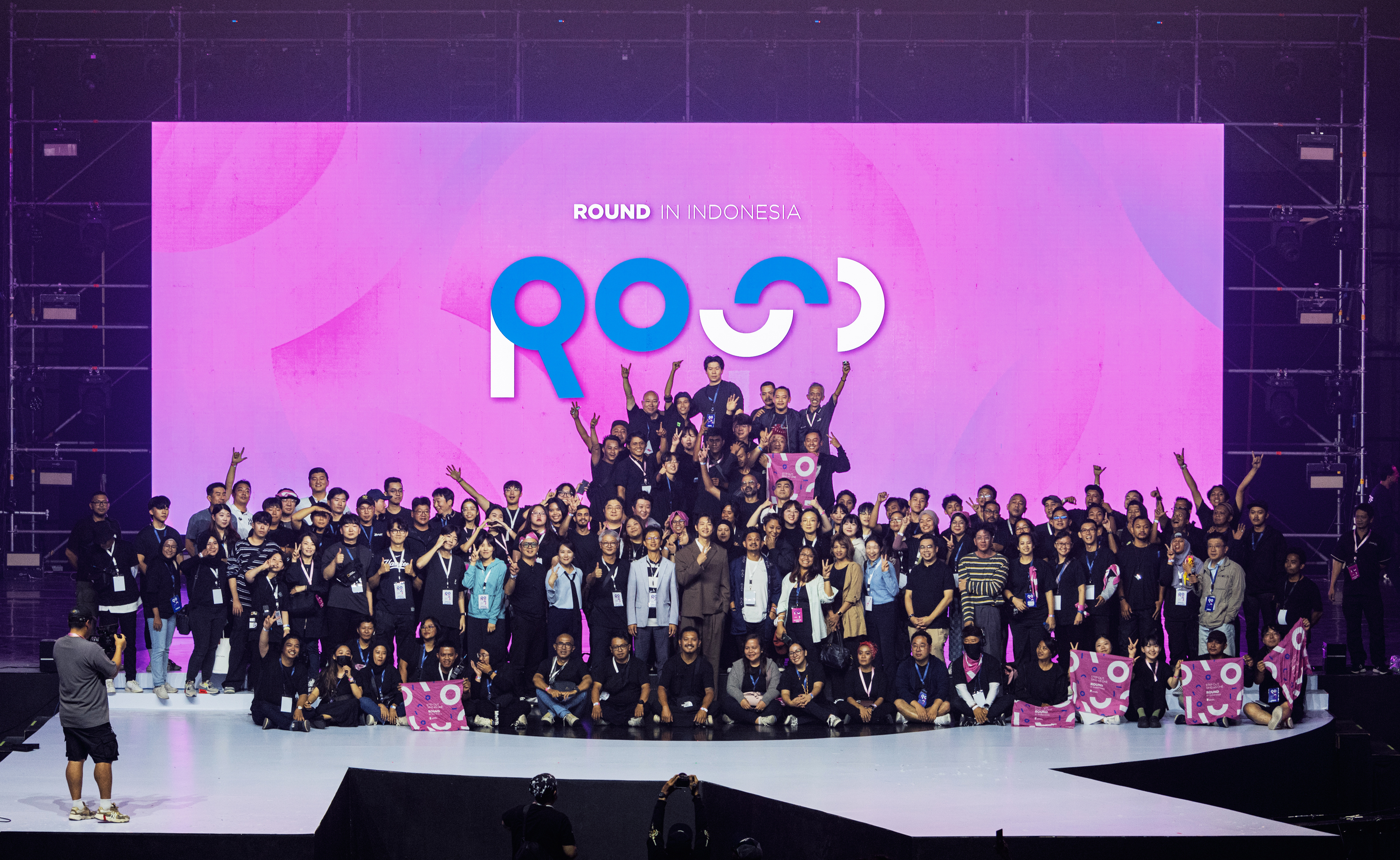
Indonesian and Korean crews gathered for a group shot after the 2023 show in Jakarta

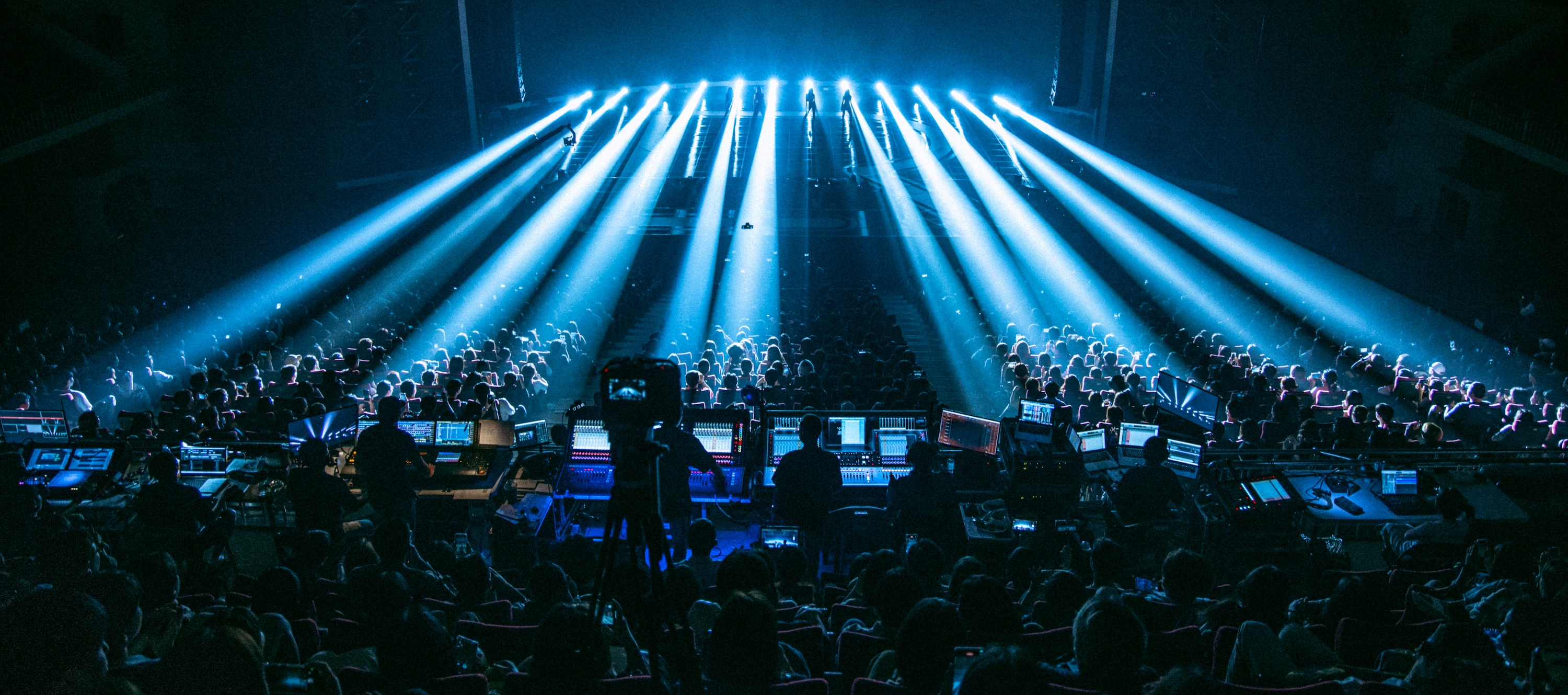
View from the upper balcony of a live performance in Busan (2024)

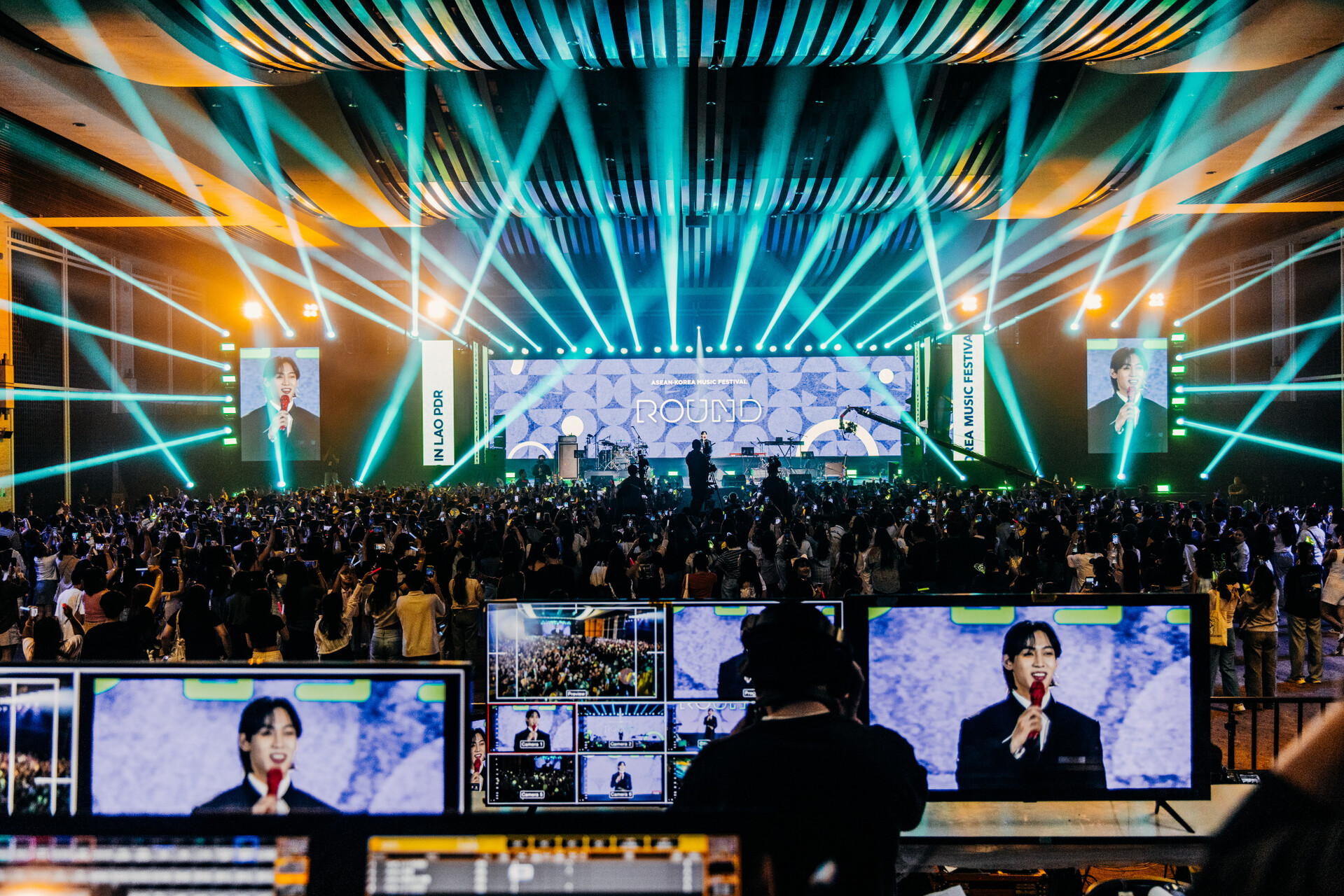
View of the control booth and the stage in Vientiane (2024)

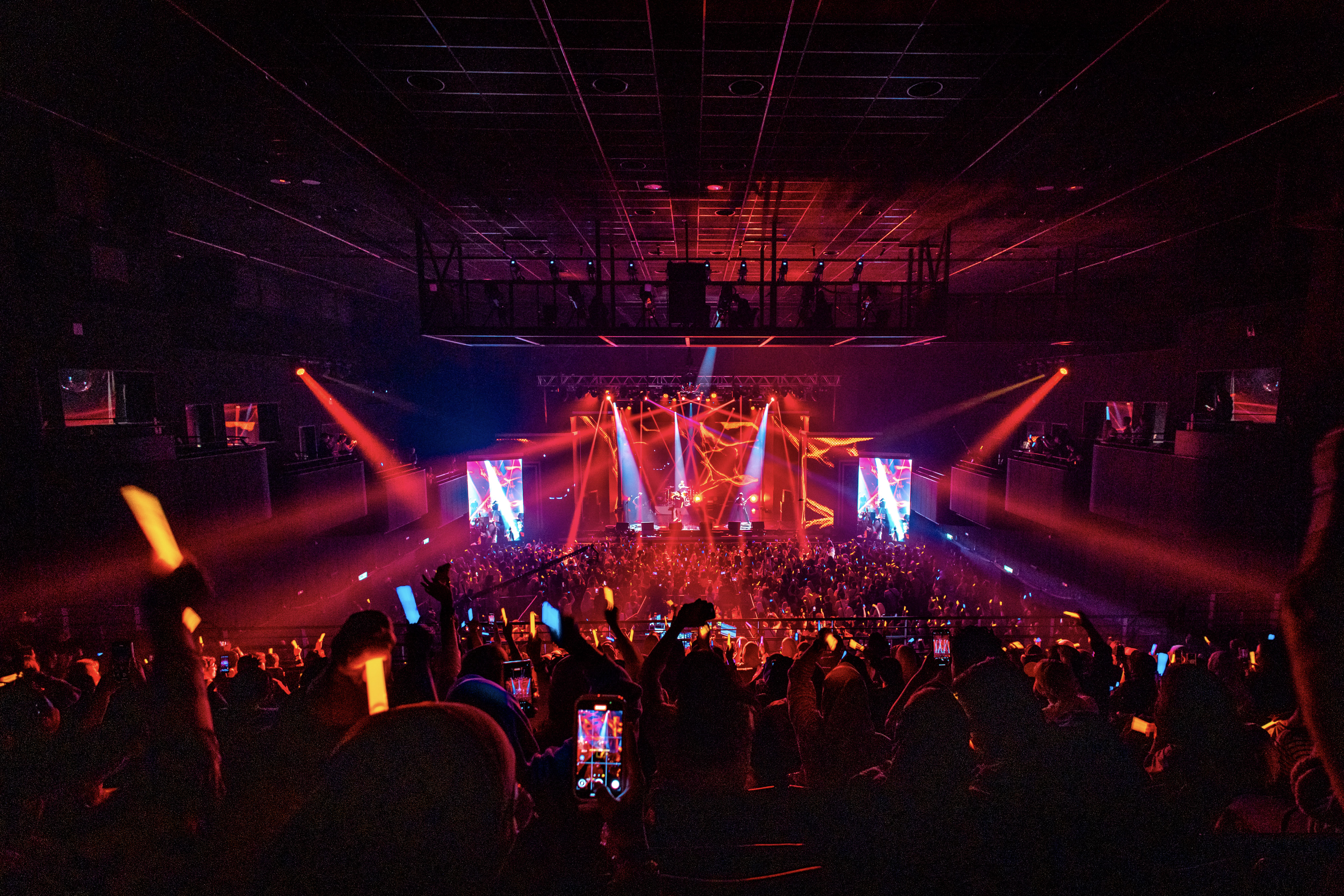
Cheering crowd at the ROUND Festival in Kuala Lumpur (2025)
