= Lunod (song) =

2021 single by Ben&Ben

Single by Ben&Ben

from the album Pebble House, Vol. 1: Kuwaderno
- Language: Filipino
- English title: Drowned
- Released: August 29, 2021; November 26, 2021 (standalone single)
- Genre: Folk-pop
- Length: 2:57
- Label: Sony Philippines
- Songwriters: Miguel Benjamin Guico; Paolo Benjamin Guico
- Producers: Agnes Reoma; Jean-Paul Verona

Ben&Ben singles chronology
"Tuloy Na Tuloy Pa Rin ang Pasko" (2021)	"Lunod" (2021)	"Mag-ingat" (2022)

Music video
- "Lunod" on YouTube

"Lunod" (lit. 'Drowned') is a song by Filipino folk-pop band Ben&Ben, featuring Zild Benitez and Juan Karlos Labajo. It was released as a digital single from their second album Pebble House, Vol. 1: Kuwaderno on August 29, 2021, through Sony Music Philippines. It was written by Paolo and Miguel Benjamin Guico and produced by Agnes Reoma and Jean-Paul Verona. It is a folk-pop track that reflects the similar feelings of giving up rather than continuing, highlighting the importance of perseverance in life. The music video was directed by Jerrold Tarog, who previously worked with the band, is a metaphorical representation of individuals navigating through a dark, harrowing tunnel to keep their heads above water.

The song received many accolades, winning the Wish Song Collaboration of the Year in the 7th Wish Music Awards and Best Music Video in the 35th Awit Awards.

== Background and release ==
In April 2021, a few months after topping Spotify's list of most streamed artists in the Philippines, Ben&Ben announced that they would take a break from live performances and start recording their second album. Ben&Ben announced on social media that they will be releasing their second album on August 29. The album was then announced as being titled Pebble House, Vol. 1: Kuwaderno.

On August 19, it was revealed that Juan Karlos Labajo and Zild Benitez were the fourth collaborators of the album. Over two months since the album's release, "Lunod" was released as its fifth single. As part of Pebble House’s track list in collaboration with Zild Benitez and Juan Karlos Labajo (who, both in the album and single, are credited as Zild and juan karlos respectively), "Lunod" takes on a rock opera-esque reflection on mental health. It was released with the album on August 29, 2021, while its standalone single was released on November 26, 2021.

In time for the music video's release in November 26, the band launched a "Lunod"-themed pop-up café at Latitude Bean+Bar in Malate, Manila, featuring an art installation inspired by Zelijah's remix and other activities related to mental health until the following day.

== Composition ==
The track was written by Paolo and Miguel Beniamin Guico, and produced by Agnes Reoma and Jean-Paul Verona. Paolo Benjamin drew inspiration for the song "Lunod" from his sister's COVID-19 experience, which led to a sense of relief and a sense of almost drowning, as they live near the sea. It is a folk-pop track that reflects the similar feelings of giving up rather than continuing, highlighting the importance of perseverance in life.

In a podcast, Paolo Benjamin emphasizes the importance of mental health in the song "Lunod", emphasizing that it's a battle that can be shared and not fought alone. He acknowledges the need for further discussion on mental health, concluding the song with the phrase "Di na muling malulunod pa" (lit. 'Never drown again'). He also expressed hope for those struggling with mental health issues, particularly during the COVID-19 pandemic. He hoped that everyone, regardless of their path, would eventually overcome their worries, thoughts, and fears, ensuring they no longer drown in their troubles.

== Other versions ==
Miguel reveals four versions of the song, with the "bipolar remix" reflecting rapper-producer Zelijah's mental health during the COVID-19 pandemic and after being diagnosed with bipolar disorder. The live acoustic performance was performed by Ben&Ben, Zild, and Juan Karlos on Facebook, showcasing their hair-raising vocals and pain-inducing vocals while standing in an empty pool. According to Ben&Ben, the video was directed by the band's violinist Kiefer Cabugao. While maintaining its overall structure, the extended version features an intricate, Andalusian-styled solo that commences midway through the propulsive track.

== Music video ==
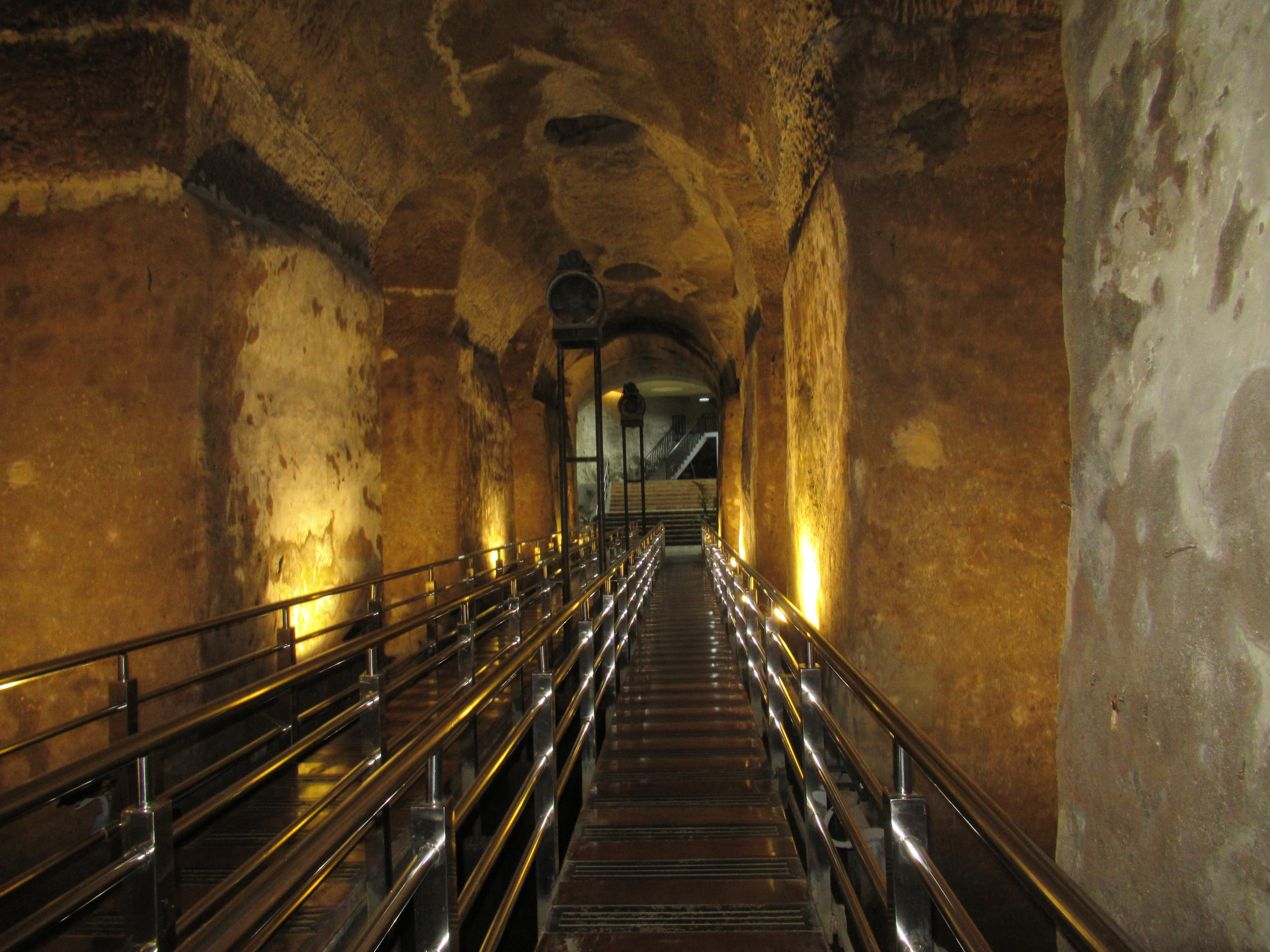
Lunod was filmed in the El Depósito Underground Water Reservoir.

The music video was released on November 26, 2021. Directed by award-winning filmmaker Jerrold Tarog, who previously worked with the band since 2018, the music video is a metaphorical representation of individuals navigating through a dark, harrowing tunnel to keep their heads above water. Paolo Benjamin explains that the music video for the song is a symbolic interpretation of the concept, from writing to location. The video depicts the band, Zild and Juan Karlos, slowly moving into a tunnel, losing breath, and then taking powerful strides to exit, symbolizing a rebirth into a more mature version of themselves. Paolo also described the energy in the music video as heavy and possibly due to a lack of oxygen as one goes deeper, describing the dark atmosphere and the poetic connection between the opening scenes.

Poch, the band's lead guitarist, believes the rock sounds in Lunod represent an aggressive, overwhelming feeling when drowning in anxiety. "Parang nasakto din yung direction. Like what Miguel said, nasakto din siya sa kaya ni Zild and JK. Kami rin, like individually sa band, may paths din kami na medyo acquainted sa rock kahit papano." Poch also explains that the music video, was a perfect fit for the song's message, as it seamlessly integrated elements of the chaotic feeling of experiencing the song. The director's edits pushed the message of the song, making it relatable and meaningful to the audience.

The film was shot at the historic El Deposito Underground Water Reservoir in San Juan City, a site of significant historical importance for the Philippine Revolution, Philippine-American War, and World War II.

== Track listing ==
Digital download and streaming

1. "Lunod" (feat. Zild & Juan Karlos) – 2:57
2. "Lunod" (Extended Version) (feat. Zild & Juan Karlos) – 3:18
3. "Lunod" (Acoustic Performance from the Pebble House) – 2:57

== Credits and personnel ==
Credits are adapted from Apple Music.

- Ben&Ben – vocals
- Zild – vocals
- juan karlos – vocals
- Paolo Benjamin Guico – songwriter
- Miguel Benjamin Guico – songwriter
- Agnes Reoma – producer
- Jean-Paul Verona – producer
- Waxiefied Sound Production – mastering engineer, mixing engineer for Dolby Atmos
- Waxie Joaquin – mastering engineer, mixing engineer for Dolby Atmos

== Accolades ==
Year	Award	Category	Result	Ref.
2022	Wish Music Awards	Wish Song Collaboration of the Year	Won	
2022	Awit Awards	Best Rock/Alternative Recording	Nominated	
2022	Awit Awards	Best Collaboration	Nominated	
2022	Awit Awards	Best Musical Arrangement	Nominated	
2022	Awit Awards	Best Music Video	Won	
2022	Awit Awards	Best Engineered Recording	Nominated	
