= Kapangyarihan =

2021 song by Filipino folk-pop band Ben&Ben

Song by Ben&Ben featuring SB19

from the album Pebble House, Vol. 1: Kuwaderno
- Language: Filipino
- English title: Power
- Released: August 29, 2021
- Genre: Folk rock; Hip-hop
- Length: 4:29
- Label: Sony
- Songwriters: Miguel Benjamin Guico; Paolo Benjamin Guico; Pablo
- Producers: Ben&Ben; Jean-Paul Verona

Music video
- "Kapangyarihan" on YouTube

"Kapangyarihan" (lit. 'Power') is a song by Filipino folk-pop band Ben&Ben, featuring P-pop boy band SB19. It was released as a digital single from their second album Pebble House, Vol. 1: Kuwaderno on August 29, 2021, through Sony Music Philippines. Written by band members and twins Miguel and Paolo Benjamin Guico and SB19 leader Pablo, it is a folk rock and hip-hop track that calls for accountability and condemns the misuse and dissemination of deceit by those in power. Additionally, the track was featured as an opening theme song for the 2024 Philippine war drama Pulang Araw and has since become a protest anthem in the Philippines. It was also associated with "Baha sa Luneta" (lit. 'Flood in Luneta') and "Trillion Peso March" protests held nationwide in September 2025.

== Background and release ==
On December 2020, a few days before Christmas, police officer Jonel Nuezca shot and killed Sonya Gregorio and her son Frank in Tarlac. Band members and twins Miguel and Paolo Benjamin Guico issued a statement in solidarity with the family. The band wrote a song and released on August 29, 2021 featuring P-pop boy band SB19, a few days after Nuezca was found guilty and sentenced.

In April 2021, a few months after topping Spotify's list of most streamed artists in the Philippines, Ben&Ben announced that they would take a break from live performances and start recording their second album. Ben&Ben announced on social media that they will be releasing their second album on August 29. The album was then announced as being titled Pebble House, Vol. 1: Kuwaderno.

On August 23, it was revealed that SB19 were the final collaborators of the album. It is the second time Ben&Ben collaborated with SB19 after "Mapa (Band Version)," a rendition from SB19's digital single.

== Composition ==
In December 22, 2020, the song was written and released in response to the case of impunity in the Philippines, involving the killing of Sonya Gregorio and her son Frank by police officer Jonel Nuezca. The band apologized for being off the radar recently following the tragic shooting of the Sonya and Frank Gregorio. They emphasized that they should have responded to the issue with greater urgency and amplify the truth, as they failed to do so.

A new version, featuring P-pop boy band SB19 was released on August 29, 2021. SB19 leader Pablo also wrote the additional lines for the new version. The track also emphasizes the need for openness, transparency, and urgency in tackling violence without compromising words, moving away from their usual heart-strumming songs.

== Music video ==
The music video was released on May 5, 2022 ahead of the 2022 Philippine elections. It features archival footage from Philippines political history projected onto an empty stage. Ben&Ben and SB19 perform alongside farmers, students, teachers, medical workers, and Indigenous people. The lighting onstage starts pink, the color of presidential candidate Leni Robredo's campaign, which Ben&Ben publicly supports. The performance ends with all on stage pointing their index fingers painted in the flag colors.

Directed by Dexter Santos, the collaboration aims to address power abuse and public service issues through the release of the "Kapangyarihan" performance video. The visual conveys the song's message through a theatrical performance, reflecting life's realities. According to the director, the theatre's intrinsic quality was utilized in presenting the music video, incorporating narrative, choreography, set, and costume design to deliver a sincere and emphatic performance. Ben&Ben stated that the audience is reminded that the performance is a call to action, emphasizing the need to address larger and stronger issues after watching.

== Usage in media ==
On July 9, 2024, GMA Network released a promotional video for their upcoming Philippine war drama, Pulang Araw. The song was chosen as part of the opening theme song for the tv series, starring Barbie Forteza, Sanya Lopez, David Licauco, Alden Richards, and Dennis Trillo. On August 4, 2024, GMA Network also released the music video for Pulang Araw on YouTube.

=== Use in protests ===
In September 2025, the song gained nationwide prominence with nationwide protests, including "Baha sa Luneta" (lit. 'Flood in Luneta') at Rizal Park and the Trillion Peso March at the People Power Monument. The events coincided with the 53rd anniversary of Martial Law and addressed allegations of corruption in flood control projects, which were being investigated in Congress of the Philippines and the Independent Commission for Infrastructure. The song was performed by Ben&Ben themselves on stage during their attendance at the rally at the People Power Monument. The song later reached the no. 1 on the iTunes Philippines song chart on the next day after the protests.

== Credits and personnel ==
Credits are adapted from Apple Music.

- Ben&Ben - vocals, producer
- SB19 - vocals
- Paolo Benjamin Guico - songwriter
- Miguel Benjamin Guico - songwriter
- Pablo - songwriter
- Jean-Paul Verona - producer
- Waxiefied Sound Production – mastering engineer, mixing engineer for Dolby Atmos
- Waxie Joaquin – mastering engineer, mixing engineer for Dolby Atmos
