= Autumn (Ben&Ben song) =

2023 single by Ben&Ben

Single by Ben&Ben

from the album The Traveller Across Dimensions
- Released: November 24, 2023
- Length: 4:03
- Label: Sony Philippines
- Songwriters: Miguel Benjamin Guico; Paolo Benjamin Guico
- Producer: Jean-Paul Verona

Ben&Ben singles chronology
| "Courage (Acoustic Ver.)" (2023) | "Autumn" (2023) | "Courage" (2023) |

Re-recorded with Belle Mariano cover

Lyric video
- "Autumn" on YouTube

"Autumn" is a song by Filipino band Ben&Ben. It was released as a second single from their album, The Traveller Across Dimensions (2024) on November 24, 2023, through Sony Music Philippines. It was written by Miguel and Paolo Benjamin Guico and produced by Jean-Paul Verona. Inspired by Paolo's experiences of long-distance relationship during the band's North American tour, it explores themes of loneliness, yearning, and the hope for a new season to arrive. The re-recorded version, features a collaboration with Belle Mariano was released on December 8, 2023. The reimagined version was released on May 7, 2026, and features new verses of the song include vulnerable lyrics expressing yearning for a loved one.

== Background and composition ==
"Autumn" was inspired by Paolo Benjamin's experiences of long-distance relationship during the band's North American tour. Later in early 2023, Miguel Benjamin, Paolo's brother, finalized the lyrics for the song, enhancing it with a bridge about different seasons, which encapsulates themes of loneliness, yearning, and hope. The band describes "Autumn" as a reflection of their evolution and maturity, presenting a realistic perspective on the subject. They explore new arrangements and production techniques to effectively convey the desired emotions.

== Duet version ==
A duet collaboration between the band and Filipino actress, singer and model Belle Mariano was announced days before the version was released on December 8, 2023, as the original soundtrack for the 2023 Filipino series, titled Can't Buy Me Love, also starring the latter.

On March 13, 2024, the band and Mariano announced that they are set to release the music video for the version. It was released on March 15, 2024.

== Reimagined version ==
The band teased the version of the song, after their reimagined of the song, Lifetime, was released on March 31, 2026. It features new verses, with emotional lyrics expressing a longing for their beloved.

The band released a reimagined version on May 7, ahead of Saranggola: The Concert. It features a gentler and more hopeful perspective on love and expresses a quest for personal peace.

== Charts ==
Chart performance for "Autumn"
| Chart (2026) | Peak position |
|---|---|
| Philippines Hot 100 (Billboard Philippines) | 26 |
| Philippines Top Songs (Billboard Philippines) | 13 |
