= Thinla =

Laotian singer-songwriter

Thinla ທິນລາ
- Thinla in 2026

Background information
- Born: Thinlamphone Mahavong; September 13, 1997 (age 29); Khong district, Champasak province, Laos
- Origin: Vientiane, Laos
- Genres: Mor lum; pop; R&B; dance
- Occupation: singer-songwriter
- Years active: 2015–present
- Labels: Nakhar Media; SG Music

Thinlamphone Mahavong (Lao: ທິນລຳພອນ ມະຫາວົງ; born September 13, 1997), known mononymously as Thinla, is a Laotian singer-songwriter whose music blends traditional mor lum with contemporary genres, including pop, R&B and dance. She represented Laos at the inaugural Eurovision Song Contest Asia 2026 with the song "Bae", placing fifth with 139 points.

== Biography ==
=== Early life ===
Mahavong was born on 13 September 1997 in Khong, Champasak, Laos. In 2006, she moved with her family to the capital, Vientiane. She studied singing, traditional Lao khap-lam performance and dance at the National School of Arts in Vientiane. She has also studied in China.

=== 2015—2021: start of career ===
Thinla began her music career in 2015 after signing with Nakhar Media, releasing music under the stage name Dork Ya Thinlamphone (ດອກຫຍ້າ ຖິ່ນລຳພອນ). Her debut song, "Nong Tai Si Hai Num Bor" (ນ້ອງຕາຍສິໄຫ້ນຳບ່), was released that year and received almost 15 million views on YouTube following its release. She subsequently toured Laos and Thailand in 2016 and 2017. Her contract with Nakhar Media ended around 2018–2019.

In November 2018, she participated in the Chinese Singing Competition held in Vientiane, where she won first place representing Laos.

In 2019, she released her first collaboration with Laotian musician Zamio P, "Na Na Na" (ນາ ນາ ນາ).

In January 2020, she placed second at the Hạ Long International Music Festival (HALOMUS) in Vietnam.

=== 2022—present: Eurovision Asia ===
Thinla and Zamio P collaborated again on "All Day All Night", released in May 2022. The song incorporated elements of Lao music into a contemporary style, including the sound of the phin. In September of the same year, they represented Laos at the AXEAN Music Showcase Festival in Singapore.

In March 2023, Thinla performed at Sabaidee Fest in Norco, California, United States. She has also performed at the 2023 and 2024 ASEAN Summits, as well as at AIPA ceremonies. In July 2024, she represented Laos at the Round Festival in Busan, South Korea.

Thinla performing "Bae" at the Eurovision Song Contest Asia 2026 in Bangkok, Thailand

On 13 September 2026, it was announced that Thinla would represent Laos at the Eurovision Song Contest Asia 2026. Her entry, "Bae", was selected through the national selection show Sieng Lao: The One, which was held on 23 September, with the result announced the following day. On 14 November 2026, she competed at Eurovision Asia in Bangkok, Thailand, placing fifth with 139 points.

== Discography ==
=== Songs ===
==== As lead artist ====
List of songs as lead artist, showing year released
Title	Year
"Nong Tai Si Hai Num Bor" (ນ້ອງຕາຍສິໄຫ້ນຳບ່)	2015
"14 Koum Pha" (14 ກຸມພາ)	2015
"Hai Nong Ngao Dee Kwa Khao Jep" (ໃຫ້ນ້ອງເຫງົາດີກວ່າເຂົາເຈັບ)	2015
"Ba Pu Sok Ha Faen" (ບະປູຊອກຫາແຟນ)	2016
"Jep La No (Cover)" (ເຈັບລະເນາະ)	2018
"Hao Sod U Der" (ເຮົາໂສດຢູ່ເດີ້) (with Xayyei Seon)	2018
"Oen Ai Khamkhong" (ເອີ້ນອ້າຍຂ້າມຂອງ)	2019

=== Singles ===
==== As lead artist ====
List of singles as lead artist, showing year released and album name
Title	Year	Album
"Yak Pon Khai Ai" (ຢາກປ້ອນໄຂ່ອ້າຍ)	2021	Non-album singles
"Hak Aeth Ko Khaoma" (ຮັກແທ້ກໍເຂົ້າມາ) (with Anon)	2021	Non-album singles
"Sok Dee Pi Mai" (ໂຊກດີປີໃໝ່) (with FAZ $F and MCBK)	2022	Non-album singles
"Keb Chaiuaai Sa" (ເກັບໃຈໄວ້ສາ)	2022	Non-album singles
"H̄mā p̄h̀ān thāng" (หมาผ่านทาง) (with P. Santa)	2022	Non-album singles
"Khao Khoeny Khidhod Haobo" (ເຂົາເຄີຍຄິດຮອດເຮົາບໍ່)	2023	Non-album singles
"Yud Bodai" (ຢຸດບໍ່ໄດ້) (with Saluna)	2023	Non-album singles
"Nok Nok Nok" (featuring Youd Lalavan)	2023	Non-album singles
"Tho Nidaibo" (ທໍ່ນີ້ໄດ້ບໍ່)	2023	Non-album singles
"Phid Phi" (ຜິດຜີ)	2023	Non-album singles
"Sound of Laos" (featuring Zamio P)	2023	Non-album singles
"Khadong Bo Aephng" (ຄ່າດອງບໍ່ແພງ)	2024	Non-album singles
"Yakmi Khuaamhak" (ຢາກມີຄວາມຮັກ) (featuring Nutdao)	2024	Non-album singles
"Gravity"	2024	Non-album singles
"Chintanakan" (ຈິນຕະນາການ)	2024	Non-album singles
"Lum" (ລືມ)	2025	Non-album singles
"Vibes" (featuring Zamio P)	2025	Non-album singles
"Talk to me" (with Alicia Dc and Iiicccyyy)	2026	Non-album singles

==== As featured artist ====
List of singles as featured artist, showing year released and album name
Title	Year	Album
"Na Na Na" (ນາ ນາ ນາ) (Zamio P featuring Thinlamphone)	2019	Non-album singles
"Chudai Bo" (ຈື່ໄດ້ບໍ່) (Zamio P featuring Thinlamphone)	2019	Non-album singles
"Rok Kan" (ຫຼອກກັນ) (Zamio P featuring Thinlamphone)	2019	Non-album singles
"Veb" (ເວດ) (Zamio P featuring Thinlamphone)	2020	Non-album singles
"All Day All Night" (Zamio P and Anon featuring Thinlamphone)	2022	Non-album singles
"Bod Sudthai" (ບົດສຸດທ້າຍ) (Phoenix Boii featuring Thinlamphone)	2025	Non-album singles
"Come to party" (Nutdao featuring Thinlamphone)	2025	Non-album singles
"Kamlangcha Choblong" (ກຳລັງຈະຈົບລົງ) (Bigpom featuring Aiila and Thinlamphone)	2026	Non-album singles
"Savor" (Annisya featuring Shanne Dandan, Thinlamphone and Ieonnutx)	2026	Non-album singles

=== Maxi-singles ===
List of maxi-singles as lead artist, showing year released and track list
Title	Year	Track list
"Ten"	2025	1. "Simply me" 2. "Endowed"; 3. "Falling apart"
"EuroVibes"	2026	1. "Bae"; 2. "Star"; 3. "Water"

== Music videos ==
Title	Year	Ref.
"Nong Tai Si Hai Num Bor" (ນ້ອງຕາຍສິໄຫ້ນຳບ່)	2015	
"14 Koum Pha" (14 ກຸມພາ)	2015	
"Ba Pu Sok Ha Faen" (ບະປູຊອກຫາແຟນ)	2016	
"Jep La No (Cover)" (ເຈັບລະເນາະ)	2018	
"Hao Sod U Der" (ເຮົາໂສດຢູ່ເດີ້ เฮา) (with Xayyei Seon)	2018	
"Oen Ai Khamkhong" (ເອີ້ນອ້າຍຂ້າມຂອງ)	2019	

== Awards and nominations ==
Award	Year	Nominee(s) / Work(s)	Category	Result	Ref.
Asia Top Awards	2024	Herself	Culture Integration Artist	Won	

Awards and achievements
Preceded by None	Laos in the Eurovision Song Contest Asia; 2026	Succeeded by TBD
