= Charlie Lim =

Singaporean musician and artist

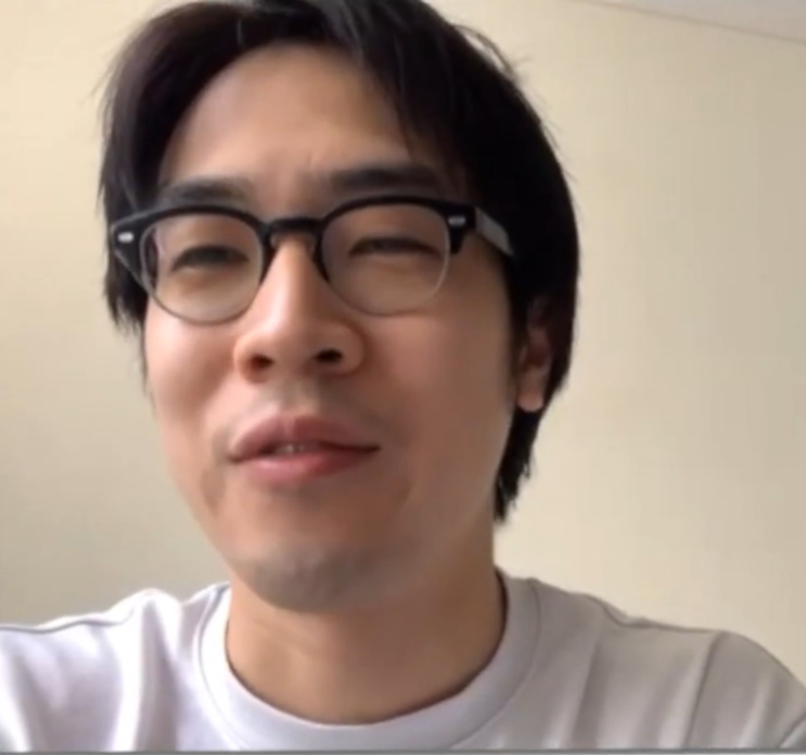
- Lim in 2021 in a Round Festival interview

Background information
- Born: 1988 (age 37–38); Singapore, Singapore
- Genres: Pop, Singer-Songwriter, Folk-Rock, Neo-soul, Electronic, R&B
- Occupations: Singer-songwriter, musician
- Instruments: Vocals, Guitar, Piano, Synthesizer, Bass, Drums
- Years active: 2011–present
- Labels: House Of Riot!, Universal Music
- Website: http://charlielim.net/

Charles Lim Yu (Note: Chinese: 林宇; pinyin: Lín Yǔ) (born 1988) is a Singaporean singer-songwriter, musician, producer and artist.

== Early life and education ==
Lim was exposed to music from a young age, as his mother taught the piano. He started singing and playing the piano in church and in school bands, learning how to play by ear. He was educated at Victoria School where he was with the school choir which came in second at the Singapore Youth Festival. At 14, he moved to Melbourne, Australia, and wanted to pursue medicine or journalism, but "music got the better of him".

In 2005, he topped the state of Victoria for music performance and was selected by VCE's Season of Excellence to perform at Melbourne's Hamer Hall.

He later returned to Singapore to serve National Service, during which he joined the Singapore Armed Forces Music & Drama Company as their frontman for the combo band, which involved performing for foreign dignitaries, army recruits, black tie events, as well as goodwill tours in Australia and Brunei.

Lim continued his studies at Monash University in 2008 to complete his Bachelor's degree in Music. He currently shuttles between Singapore, Melbourne and London.

== Musical career ==
Charlie Lim broke into the Southeast Asian music scene in 2011 with his self-titled debut EP. Signing with management label House of Riot in 2012, he continued to tour the region, playing major festivals such as Mosaic Music Festival in Singapore, Singapore International Jazz Festival, Wonderland Festival in Manila, Jarasum International Jazz Festival in Korea, Urbanscapes in Kuala Lumpur, Clockenflap in Hong Kong, Java Jazz Festival in Indonesia, Bigsound and Brisbane Festival in Australia supporting acts such as Kimbra, José Gonzalez, Émilie Simon, Lucy Rose, Lenka, Khalil Fong, and Snarky Puppy.

Lim released TIME/SPACE in 2015, an introspective and melancholic double EP that explores "different polarities" of his musical interests, with TIME reflecting his folkier, singer-songwriter sensibilities and SPACE a manifestation of his DIY approach to experimental pop production. The album went to #1 on Singapore's iTunes charts within an hour of its release. The Straits Times gave it a glowing review of 4.5/5 stars, and awarded it the Best Pop Album of 2015. Popular media outlets such as Today, Popspoken, Beehype and Juice, also considered the record as one of the best music releases of the year.

Following two sold-out shows at the 10th edition of the Mosaic Music Festival, Lim performed TIME/SPACE to another sold-out crowd in Singapore at the Esplanade Concert Hall, as part of a triple bill with Inch Chua and The Great Spy Experiment.

In 2015, Lim was commissioned to write two theme songs for the 28th Southeast Asian Games. He performed the song "Still" at the Singapore National Stadium for the Games' closing ceremony.

In late 2016, Lim signed his first major record deal with Universal Music Singapore and released his sophomore album CHECK-HOOK in 2018, which was heavily influenced by UK garage and electronic dance music. The album also clinched a #1 spot on the iTunes chart and was awarded Best Song of The Year by Apple Music.

For the 2018 Singapore National Day Parade, Lim updated and performed the classic 1987 National Day song, "We Are Singapore". His prelude was then turned into a full song, "Room at the Table". It was the opening song for 2020 National Day Parade, with proceeds donated to charities supporting migrant workers during the COVID-19 pandemic.

Lim also co-wrote and produced ‘Breathing City’ (2021) for 2021’s NDP.

In 2021, Lim received the Young Artist Award conferred by the National Arts Council, Singapore's highest award for arts practitioners aged 35 and below. He is currently music director of Indiego, a local internet radio station and platform supporting local and independent music.

In 2025, Lim wrote and performed "Here We Are", the official theme song for NDP 2025 and SG60.

== Discography ==
- Charlie Lim EP (2011)
- TIME/SPACE (2015)
- CHECK-HOOK (2018)
- Hollow (2018) with Katz
- CHECK-HOOK: Remixes - Wave 1 (2019)
- CHECK-HOOK: Remixes - Wave 2 (2020)
- Welcome Home [Swimful Remix] (2020) with BIBI
- Hummingbird (2020) with Linying
- Two Sides (2020) with Gentle Bones
- Room at the Table (2020)
- Live at the Star Theatre (2020)
- Ashes (2020) with Miho Fukuhara
- Won't You Come Around (2021) with Aisyah Aziz
- Forgetting (2021) with Katz
- So I Say What's Up (2022) with Sheikh Haikel
- Boyhood (2022) with ABANGSAPAU
- Into Dreams (2022) with Ng Pei-Sian
- Definitely (2023) with Linying and Katz

== Music videos ==
Year	Song	Director(s)
2015	"I Only Tell The Truth"	Felipe P. Soares
2016	"Bitter"	Anita Lester
2016	"Conspiracy"	Lenne Chai
2017	"Light Breaks In"	Jonathan Choo
2018	"Welcome Home"	Jonathan Choo
2018	"Circles"	GX Khoo
2018	"Zero-Sum"	Jasper Tan
2025	"Here We Are"	He Shuming
