= Masdo =

Malaysian rock band

Kugiran Masdo
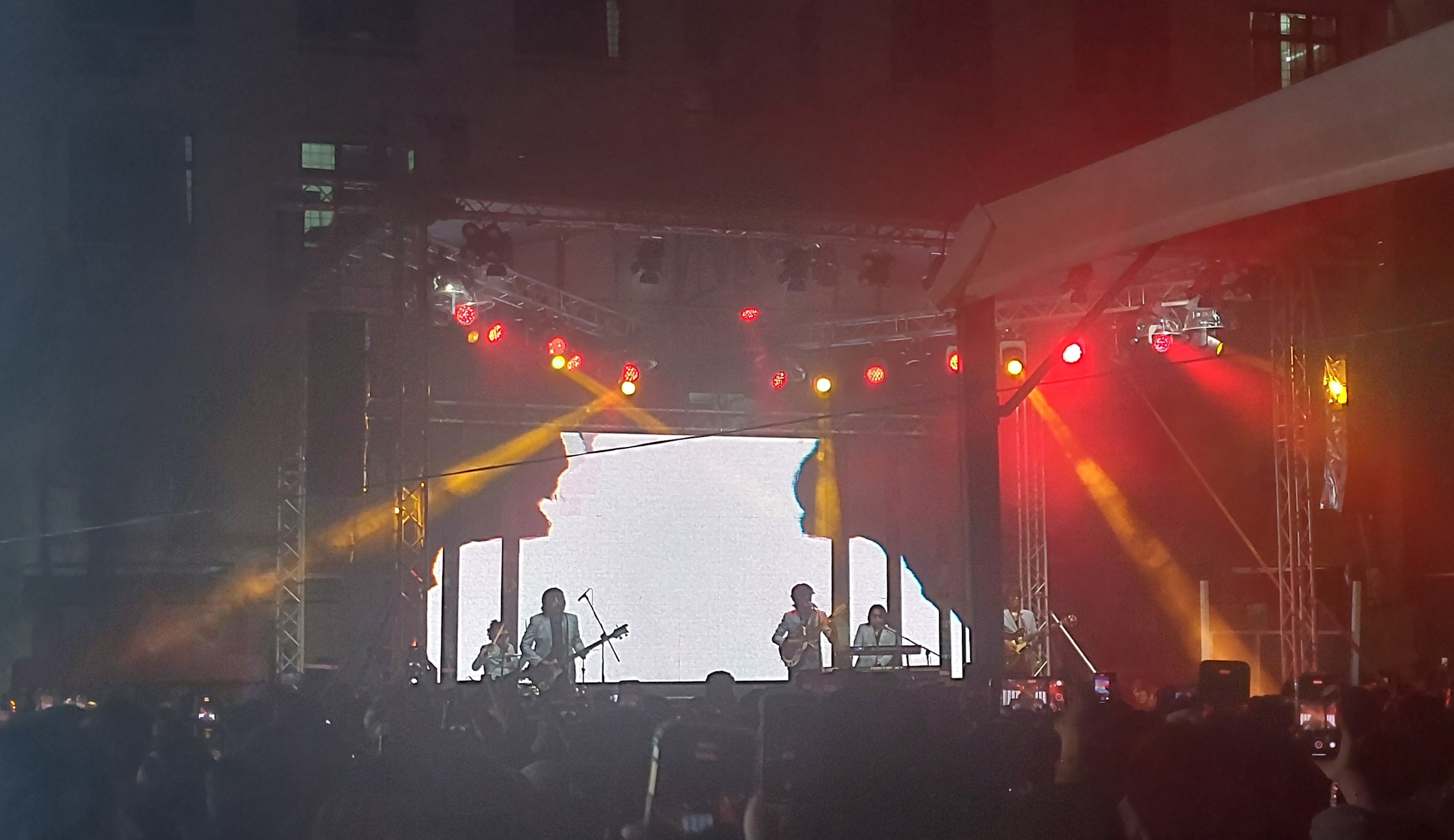
- Kugiran Masdo; 2024

Background information
- Also known as: MASDO , The Lipstik
- Origin: Kuala Lumpur, Malaysia
- Genres: Pop, Rock, Pop yeh yeh, Rock n roll
- Years active: 2015 – present
- Labels: Kamar Seni Studio; Warner Music Malaysia
- Members: Ali Sariah; Putuceri; Amirul Hakim; Ambobzeela
- Website: www.tokorasmimasdo.com

Masdo, also known as Kugiran Masdo, is a Malaysian rock band formed in 2015. Their musical style, which modernizes pop yeh-yeh and 1960s pop genres. Their successful singles include Dinda, and Bunga.

== Members ==
- Azham Ahmad/Ambobzeela (Am) - drummer (2015–present)
- Ahmad Azanol Khushairie /Putu Ceri - bassist, vocalist(2015–present)
- Aliff Fahmi Bahtiar/Ali Sariah - lead vocalist, guitarist(2015–present)
- Muhammad Aizat Asymawi bin Mohd. Ismail /Asmawi-lead guitarist,vocalist(2015–present)
- Amirul hakim - backup vocalist(2026–present)

== Discography ==
=== Studio albums ===
Year	Album	Album details	Note
2017	Selamat Tinggal Pujaan	Label: Kugiran Masdo Empire; Format: CD, digital download	

=== EPs ===
Year	Album	Album details	Note
2020	Jalan Abbey	Label: Kugiran Masdo Empire; Format: CD, digital download	
2026	Ruang	Label: Kugiran Masdo Empire; Format: digital download, Streaming media	Latest EP by Masdo

=== Singles ===
Year	Title	Album	Note
2015	Malam Pesta Rock n Roll	Selamat Tinggal Pujaan	
2015	Bercanda Di Malam Indah	Selamat Tinggal Pujaan	
2015	Teruna Dan Dara	Selamat Tinggal Pujaan	Soundtracks for Bikers Kental 2 and The Hantus
2015	Kecundang	Selamat Tinggal Pujaan	Soundtrack for The Hantus
2015	"Miss Flower Learns To Twist"	Selamat Tinggal Pujaan	
2015	Berduka Lara	Selamat Tinggal Pujaan	
2015	Ratu Hati	Selamat Tinggal Pujaan	
2016	Bunga	Selamat Tinggal Pujaan	
2019	"Dinda"	Dinda	Finalist song at Anugerah Juara Lagu 34
2020	Kasih dan Sayang	Jalan Abbey	
2021	Janji Manis	Jalan Abbey	
2021	Dewi Puspita	Jalan Abbey	
2021	"Nearly Near You"	Jalan Abbey	Written by Adam Hastings, former member of The Bootleg Beatles, UK.
2022	Hari Raya Kini Dah Kembali		featuring Bunga
2023	Inilah JalanNya		Lyric & Composer: Noh Salleh (FINALIST SONG OF THE 38TH ANUGERAH JUARA LAGU)
2023	Pujaanku		featuring Aisyah Aziz (FINALIST SONG OF THE 39TH ANUGERAH JUARA LAGU)
2024	Perih Jerih		
2025	Begini Jadinya		
2026	Teristimewa	Ruang	

=== Other appearances ===
Year	Title	Album	Note
2020	Hari Inikan Hari Raya	Special song in conjunction with Hari Raya 2020	
2021	"Lautan Asmara"	Exclusive for JOOX platform listeners	
