= Pebble House, Vol. 1: Kuwaderno =

Studio album by Ben&Ben
- Released: 29 August 2021
- Recorded: 2021
- Genre: Indie folk; folk-pop; pop rock
- Length: 46:47
- Label: Sony Music Philippines
- Producer: Jean-Paul Verona; Sam Marquez; Ben&Ben

Ben&Ben chronology
Limasawa Street (2019)	Pebble House, Vol. 1: Kuwaderno (2021)	The Traveller Across Dimensions (2024)

Singles from Pebble House, Vol. 1: Kuwaderno
- 1. "Upuan" Released: 7 May 2021; 2. "Magpahinga" Released: 14 May 2021; 3. "Pasalubong" Released: 30 July 2021; 4. "Sugat" Released: 13 August 2021; 5. "Lunod" Released: 12 November 2021

Pebble House, Vol. 1: Kuwaderno is the second studio album by Filipino indie folk-pop band Ben&Ben. It features 12 tracks written in Filipino, including six collaborations with other Filipino artists. The album was released on 29 August 2021 under Sony Music Philippines. All tracks in this album were included on Spotify's Top 200 chart in three days, seven of which were included on the Top 100 charts of the same music streaming platform.

== Background ==
In April 2021, a few months after topping Spotify's list of most streamed artists in the Philippines, Ben&Ben announced that they would take a break from live performances and start recording their second album. Ben&Ben announced on social media that they will be releasing their second album on 29 August 2021. The album was then announced as being titled Pebble House, Vol. 1: Kuwaderno.

=== Collaborations ===
On 28 July 2021, it was announced that Moira Dela Torre was the first collaborator of the album. It is the second time Ben&Ben collaborated with dela Torre after "Paalam," a song featured in Moira's album "Patawad."

More than a week later, via Twitter spaces, it was revealed that Munimuni were the second collaborators of the album.

On 17 August 2021, through Facebook live, it was revealed that Chito Miranda, the lead singer-songwriter for the band Parokya ni Edgar, was the third collaborator of the album.

Two days later, it was revealed that Juan Karlos Labajo and Zild Benitez were the fourth collaborators of the album.

On 22 August 2021, a week before the release of the album, it was announced that KZ Tandingan was the fifth collaborator of the album.

A day after, it was revealed that SB19 were the final collaborators of the album. It is the second time Ben&Ben collaborated with SB19 after "Mapa (Band Version)," a rendition from SB19's digital single.

=== Singles ===
The first single "Upuan" was released on 7 May 2021. Paolo and Miguel shared that they started writing the song in a hotel room in Dumaguete while they were on tour for their debut album.

"Upuan" is a song that describes the palpable romantic tension that arises from friendships that are formed by sitting next to each other.

— Paolo & Miguel Guico, NME (May 2021)

A week later, the second single "Magpahinga" was released. Ben&Ben revealed that the song was dedicated to the victims of COVID-19. Paolo shared that the song was written when their sister got the disease.

"Magpahinga" was written when our sister got COVID-19 more than a month ago.It was one of the toughest times for our family. In the middle of these dark days, in the middle of these battles we silently fight, may we remember that it's okay to rest

— Paolo Guico, on the song "Magpahinga", Twitter

The third single "Pasalubong" was released on 29 July 2021, more than two months after releasing the second single. In collaboration with fellow Filipino artist Moira Dela Torre, the song is inspired by its double meaning, which refers to gifts presented by homecomers, and could also mean "to meet."

"Pasalubong" is a song that will certainly bring up all kinds of feelings, and hopefully will give people comfort in knowing that they aren’t alone in their frustration and longing.

— Ben&Ben, on the song "Pasalubong", The Philippine Star

A couple of weeks later, the fourth single titled "Sugat" was released. Written by the band's percussionist Toni Muñoz and vocalist Paolo Guico, in collaboration with fellow indie folk band Munimuni, "Sugat" is a song that reflects on healing after facing the emptiness of loss.

When Toni first presented the song as it was at the time to the band, Paolo immediately thought of a chorus section to address and accompany the message of the verses. It was the deeply personal experiences of both Toni and Paolo that made "Sugat" such a powerful song of self-healing and overcoming past wounds.

— Ben&Ben, on the song "Sugat", Rappler

Over two months since the album's release, "Lunod" was released as its fifth single. As part of Pebble House’s track list in collaboration with Zild Benitez and Juan Karlos Labajo (who, both in the album and single, are credited as Zild and juan karlos respectively), "Lunod" takes on a rock opera-esque reflection on mental health.

The song is narrated as the band, with Zild and Juan Karlos, move deeper and deeper into the tunnel slowly—losing breath, then in the latter half taking powerful strides to move out of it. This signals a ‘rebirth’ into a new, more mature version of the self.

— Paolo Benjamin, on the song "Lunod", Inquirer

== Digital concert ==
Kuwaderno: Ben&Ben Live At The Smart Araneta Coliseum, An Online Concert
- Virtual concert by Ben&Ben
- Venue: Smart Araneta Coliseum
- Associated album: Pebble House, Vol. 1: Kuwaderno
- Date: December 5, 2021
- Duration: ~3 hours
- No. of shows: 1
- Attendance: N/A

On 10 October 2021, Ben&Ben announced a digital concert based on tracks on this album, scheduled on 5 December 2021. Branded as Kuwaderno, this digital concert was staged at the Smart Araneta Coliseum and was streamed on the live streaming digital platform KTX.ph.

Later on 30 January 2022, the digital concert was made available again on the GigaPlay app of Smart Communications.

== Track listing ==
All songs were written by Paolo Guico and Miguel Guico except where noted.

Pebble House, Vol. 1: Kuwaderno
No.	Title	Writer(s)	Producer(s)	Length
1.	"Kuwaderno"	P. Barretto; T. Muñoz	Jean-Paul Verona; Poch Barretto	1:02
2.	"Kasayaw"		Jean-Paul Verona; Poch Barretto	3:47
3.	"Swimming Pool" (featuring Chito Miranda)		Jean-Paul Verona; Jam Villanueva	3:37
4.	"Elyu"		Jean-Paul Verona; Patricia Lasaten	3:46
5.	"Pasalubong" (featuring Moira Dela Torre)	P. Guico; M. Guico; M. Dela Torre; J. Hernandez	Jean-Paul Verona; Andrew De Pano	4:03
6.	"Magpahinga"		Jean-Paul Verona; Poch Barretto	4:01
7.	"Lunod" (featuring Zild and Juan Karlos)		Jean-Paul Verona; Agnes Reoma	2:57
8.	"Sabel" (featuring KZ Tandingan)	P. Guico; M. Guico; T. Muñoz	Jean-Paul Verona; Toni Muñoz	3:02
9.	"Kapangyarihan" (featuring SB19)	P. Guico; M. Guico; J. Nase	Jean-Paul Verona; Ben&Ben	4:29
10.	"Sugat" (featuring Munimuni)	P. Guico; T. Muñoz	Jean-Paul Verona; Keifer Cabugao	5:10
11.	"Upuan"		Jean-Paul Verona; Ben&Ben	4:31
12.	"Ilang Tulog Na Lang (Note: The song is performed by Toni Muñoz, one of the song's writers and the band's percussionist.)"	T. Muñoz; P. Guico	Jean-Paul Verona; Miguel Benjamin Guico	3:29
13.	"Kayumanggi"		Jean-Paul Verona; Andrew De Pano	2:46
Total length:				46:47

== Personnel ==
- Miguel Benjamin Guico – lead vocals, acoustic guitar
- Paolo Benjamin Guico – lead vocals, acoustic guitar
- Poch Barretto – lead guitar, backing vocals ("Sugat")
- Jam Villanueva – drums
- Agnes Reoma – bass
- Patricia Lasaten – keyboards
- Toni Muñoz – percussion, lead vocals ("Sugat", "Sabel", "Ilang Tulog Na Lang"), backing vocals ("Pasalubong")
- Andrew de Pano – percussion, backing vocals
- Keifer Cabugao – violin, backing vocals

=== Additional personnel ===
- Chito Miranda - co-lead vocals ("Swimming Pool")
- Moira Dela Torre - co-lead vocals ("Pasalubong")
- Zild and Juan Karlos - co-lead vocals ("Lunod")
- KZ Tandingan - co-lead vocals ("Sabel")
- SB19 - co-lead vocals ("Kapangyarihan")
- Munimuni - co-lead vocals ("Sugat")
- Manila String Machine - violin instrumentals ("Elyu")
- Karen Dela Fuente, Karelle Bulan, and Isobel Funk - creative directors
- Jean-Paul Verona - producer
- Sam Marquez - co-producer
- Leon Zervos - mastering

== Accolades ==
Awards and nominations for Pebble House, Vol. 1: Kuwaderno
Year	Organization	Award	Result	Ref.
2021	NME Awards	Best Asian Album	Nominated	
2022	Wish 107.5 Music Awards	Wish Song Collaboration of the Year (for Lunod)	Won	
2022	Wish 107.5 Music Awards	Wish Song Collaboration of the Year (for Sugat)	Nominated	
2022	Awit Awards	Album of the Year	Won	
2022	Awit Awards	Song of the Year (for Pasalubong)	Nominated	
2022	Awit Awards	Favorite Song of the Year (for Pasalubong)	Nominated	
2022	Awit Awards	Favorite Song of the Year (for Upuan)	Nominated	
2022	Awit Awards	Best Rock/Alternative Recording (for Swimming Pool)	Nominated	
2022	Awit Awards	Best Rock/Alternative Recording (for Lunod)	Nominated	
2022	Awit Awards	Best Ballad Recording (for Pasalubong)	Nominated	
2022	Awit Awards	Best Performance by a Group Recording Artist (for Upuan)	Nominated	
2022	Awit Awards	Best Collaboration (for Sugat)	Nominated	
2022	Awit Awards	Best Collaboration (for Lunod)	Nominated	
2022	Awit Awards	Best Collaboration (for Kapangyarihan)	Nominated	
2022	Awit Awards	Best Collaboration (for Sabel)	Won	
2022	Awit Awards	Best World Music Recording (for Sabel)	Won	
2022	Awit Awards	Best Traditional/Contemporary Folk Recording (for Sugat)	Nominated	
2022	Awit Awards	Best Musical Arrangement (for Upuan)	Won	
2022	Awit Awards	Best Musical Arrangement (for Lunod)	Nominated	
2022	Awit Awards	Best Music Video (for Lunod)	Won	
2022	Awit Awards	Best Engineered Recording (for Lunod)	Nominated	
