= The Traveller Across Dimensions =

Studio album by Ben&Ben
- Released: November 29, 2024
- Recorded: 2023–2024
- Studio: Kwarto Studios (Manila); Hit Productions (Makati); Spryta Productions (Mandaluyong); Sunny Side Sound Productions (Quezon City)
- Length: 44:13
- Label: Sony Music Philippines
- Producer: Ziv; Petra Sihombing; Jean-Paul Verona; Sam Marquez; Tim Marquez; Ben&Ben

Ben&Ben chronology
Pebble House, Vol. 1: Kuwaderno (2021)	The Traveller Across Dimensions (2024)

Singles from The Traveller Across Dimensions
- 1. "Could Be Something" Released: June 30, 2023; 2. "Autumn" Released: November 24, 2023; 3. "Courage" Released: December 1, 2023; 4. "Comets" Released: May 10, 2024; 5. "Triumph" Released: October 18, 2024; 6. "New Dimensions" Released: November 29, 2024

The Traveller Across Dimensions is the third studio album by Filipino indie folk-pop band Ben&Ben. The album was released on November 29, 2024, under Sony Music Philippines.

== Background ==
More than three years after the success of their second album Pebble House, Vol. 1: Kuwaderno, Ben&Ben announced on social media that they will be releasing their third album on November 29, 2024. The album was then announced as being titled The Traveller Across Dimensions in a trailer released on their social media pages.

In October 2024, the band later revealed that the album is a concept album featuring the story of Liwanag, a fictional character who belongs to a race of inter-dimensional beings called the Travellers. Liwanag is on a quest to reach the Duyan Dimension, a place where all travellers achieve a state of perpetual inner peace. Liwanag must complete her lifecrest as she travels through the three dimensions of life: Light (Innocence), Energy (Struggle) and Feel (Maturity). The album's twelve tracks are a reflection of Liwanag's thoughts, feelings, and experiences as she journeys through each dimension.

=== Singles ===
The first single of the album "Could Be Something" was released on June 30, 2023. Lead vocalists Paolo and Miguel Guico revealed that they started writing the song when a fan approached them while eating at a place in Makati City and thanked them for making the fan believe in love again.

"Could Be Something" is a song about turning doubt into belief. It's the revival of hope after being caught in a very cynical place. It's the feeling you get after meeting someone who unexplainably makes you believe in love again, or finding a new passion that sparks life in you.”

— Ben&Ben, on the song "Could Be Something", GMA Network (June 2023)

The second single of the album "Autumn" was released on November 24, 2023. The song is inspired by long-distance relationships, revealing that the song was written during their North American tour in Canada when the band's lead vocalist Paolo Guico felt lonely without his girlfriend.

“Autumn” takes shape as a lyrical exploration of themes such as loneliness, yearning, and the resilient hope for the arrival of a new season.”

— Ben&Ben , on the song "Autumn", Billboard Philippines (November 2024)

The third single of the album "Courage" was released a week later. The band revealed that the song is about overcoming their past struggles and for their listeners, who are grappling with issues in varying situations such as bullying, academic setbacks, work-related stress, and financial burdens.

“A lot of the things we were hoping for to happen didn't and there were a lot of failures as well — internally and in things we were hoping to achieve. And when you experience a lot of failures and setbacks, it makes you question why you're doing things. 'Courage' came from that heavy feeling of despair.”

— Miguel Benjamin Guico , on the song "Courage", Billboard Philippines (January 2024)

The fourth single of the album "Comets" was released on May 10, 2024. The song was written in 2020 during the COVID-19 pandemic and was inspired by the band's losses that they have encountered in the past four years, like breakups, end of friendships, and end of professional relationships.

“Though mostly dwelling on that feeling of loss, the song ends with the hopeful realization of gratitude—being thankful for ever having experienced any of it at all. With each loss comes a painful process of asking why the nature of life is as such. The answer is hardly ever straightforward, but reveals itself over long periods of time. 'COMETS' is an expression of that very journey, and hopes to help the listener through these realities in their lives too.”

— Ben&Ben , on the song "Comets", GMA Network (May 2024)

The fifth single of the album "Triumph" was released on October 18, 2024. The sound of Triumph described as arena rock, marked a shift from the overall indie folk and folk-pop sound in their previous albums produced.

== Production ==
The band spent one or two days in brainstorming each song. Music producer Ziv then synthesized each band member's contribution to form an arrangement of the song, then the band would gradually revise the arrangement until its final revision.

Ben&Ben collaborated with animators from Puppeteers Studio to produce the music videos of the album's songs. The band explored using animation to experiment visual storytelling in their music videos and "to stray from the more reality-based music videos [Ben&Ben has] done so many of throughout [their] career." In an interview, band member Miguel recalled that the animation and the music "completed each other", as they conceptualized using animation in their album during their songwriting process, which then influenced the rest of their production.

"Triumph" is an anthem for those who are tired of being tired. It's the fight song for the moments we have to be our own cheerleader, our own support system, our own best friend, our own defender. Even in our weakest moments, there are times we may feel the need to manifest victory, to speak hope into ourselves that we can emerge through any struggle triumphant.”

— Ben&Ben, on the song "Triumph", Daily Tribune (October 2024)

== Reception ==
The Traveller Across Dimensions ratings
Review scores
Source	Rating
Rolling Stone Philippines	2/5 stars

Elijah Pareño of Rolling Stone Philippines praised the instrumentation of the album's songs, but criticized that the album "lacks the emotional depth to make a convincing narrative" and the themes of its songs as a concept album were disorganized."

== Track listing ==
The Traveller Across Dimensions
No.	Title	Writer(s)	Producer(s)	Length
1.	"The Traveller"	P. Guico	Poch Barretto; Ziv	0:59
2.	"Could Be Something"	M. Guico; P. Guico	Ben&Ben; timothy Run; Sam Marquez	3:16
3.	"Supernatural"	P. Guico	Ziv	2:38
4.	"Autumn"	M. Guico; P. Guico	Jean-Paul Verona; Ben&Ben	4:03
5.	"Winter"	M. Guico; P. Guico	Ziv	3:37
6.	"Burn"	M. Guico; P. Guico	Petra Sihombing	2:50
7.	"Comets"	M. Guico; P. Guico	Petra Sihombing	3:56
8.	"Courage"	M. Guico; P. Guico	Jean-Paul Verona; Ben&Ben	4:23
9.	"Triumph"	M. Guico; P. Guico	Ziv	2:53
10.	"Peace of Mind"	M. Guico	Petra Sihombing	3:33
11.	"Shutter (Note: The song is performed by Andrew De Pano and Toni Muñoz, the songwriters and the band's percussionists.)"	A. De Pano; T. Muñoz	Ziv	3:58
12.	"Tomorrow With You"	M. Guico; P. Guico	Petra Sihombing	3:44
13.	"New Dimensions"	M. Guico; P. Guico	Ziv	4:18
Total length:				44:13

== Personnel ==
=== Ben&Ben ===
- Miguel Benjamin Guico – lead vocals, acoustic guitar
- Paolo Benjamin Guico – lead vocals, acoustic guitar
- Poch Barretto – lead guitar, backing vocals ("Triumph")
- Jam Villanueva – drums, backing vocals ("Triumph")
- Agnes Reoma – bass, backing vocals ("Triumph")
- Patricia Lasaten – keyboards, backing vocals ("Triumph)
- Toni Muñoz – percussion, lead vocals ("Shutter"), backing vocals ("Triumph")
- Andrew de Pano – percussion, lead vocals ("Shutter"), backing vocals ("Triumph")
- Keifer Cabugao – violin, backing vocals ("Triumph")

=== Technical ===
- Ziv – co-producer (tracks 1, 3, 5, 9, 11, 13), saxophone (track 12)
- Petra Sihombing – co-producer (tracks 6–7, 10–12)
- Jean-Paul Verona – co-producer (tracks 4, 8), mixing engineer (track 4, 8)
- Sam Marquez – co-producer (track 2)
- Tim Marquez – co-producer (track 2)
- Erika De Pano - additional vocals (track 11)

=== Recording ===
- Jacques Jenkins – mixing engineer (tracks 1–3, 5–6, 9, 11, 13)
- Moko Aguswan – mixing engineer (tracks 7, 9–10, 12)
- Waxie Joaquin – mixing and mastering engineer (tracks 1–13)
- Leon Zervos – mastering engineer (tracks 1–13)
- Daryl Reyes – recording engineer (track 3, 5, 11, 13)
- David Lina – recording engineer (track 6–7, 10, 12)
- Rene Serna – recording engineer (track 4, 8–9)
- Daniel Monong – recording engineer (track 2)

=== Creative credits ===
- Katrina Umatam – album art
- Aurthur Mercader – album concept, story and creative direction
- Puppeteer Animation Studios – album concept, story and creative direction
- Jether Dane Guadalupe – co-creative direction
- Amy Nayve – packaging design concept and execution, pop-up design
- Pumapapel Design Studio – packaging design concept and execution
