= Ben&Ben =

Filipino indie folk-pop band

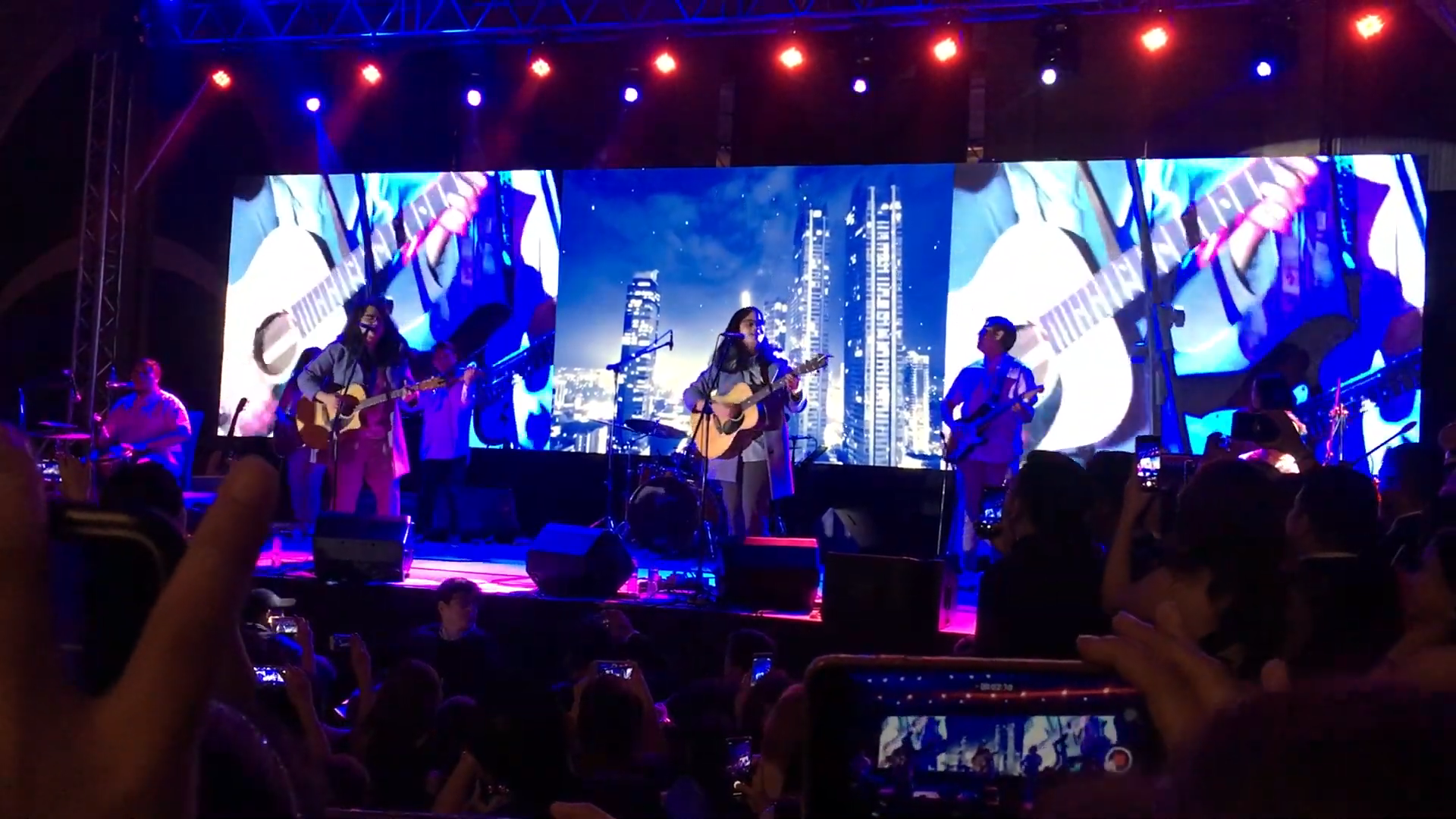
- Ben&Ben performing in December 2018

Background information
- Also known as: The Benjamins (2016)
- Origin: Manila, Philippines
- Genres: Indie folk; folk-pop; pop rock
- Works: Discography; songs
- Years active: 2016–present
- Label: Sony Music Philippines
- Members: Paolo Benjamin Guico; Miguel Benjamin Guico; Poch Barretto; Agnes Reoma; Pat Lasaten; Toni Muñoz; Andrew De Pano; Keifer Cabugao
- Past members: Jam Villanueva
- Website: benandbenmusic.com

Ben&Ben is a Filipino indie and folk-pop band from Manila. They were formed in 2016 by twin brothers Paolo and Miguel Benjamin Guico (each on lead vocals and acoustic guitars), calling themselves The Benjamins. A year later, they expanded into an ensemble and settled on the current name, adding Poch Barretto (electric guitar), Keifer Cabugao (violin), Patricia Lasaten (keyboards), Toni Muñoz (percussion), Andrew de Pano (percussion), Agnes Reoma (bass guitar), and Jam Villanueva (drums). The band's musical style has garnered praise for its anthemic quality and emotional engagement that appeals to a broad audience, while their lyrics focus on subjects including loss, heartbreak and relationships, and the journey towards self-love.

The band's first effort, a self-titled extended play (EP), was released in 2016. The EP's singles, "Leaves" and "Kathang Isip", helped raise Ben&Ben to prominence. Under Sony Music Philippines, the band released their debut studio album Limasawa Street (2019) to critical and commercial success; the single "Pagtingin" earned them the Awit Award for Best Performance by a Group Recording Artist. Their second studio album Pebble House, Vol. 1: Kuwaderno (2021) received acclaim for its reflective lyricism and sociopolitical themes. It won the Awit Award for Album of the Year and was named by NME as one of the 25 best Asian albums of the year.

They won more Awit Awards the latter years. In 2023, Ben&Ben was one of the big winners with Best Performance by a Group Recording Artist, Best Pop Recording and Music Video of the Year for "Paninindigan Kita." In 2024, they received the "Most Streamed Artist" Digital Platform Award. In 2025, The Traveller Across Dimensions won Album of the Year while "Triumph" won Best Performance by a Group Recording Artist. In 2026, they won Best Performance by a Group for "Saranggola".

Ben&Ben have received numerous accolades, including an Asia Artist Award, an Aliw Award, a NME Award, two Myx Music Awards, three Star Awards, and sixteen Awit Awards. In 2020, they placed 29th on the Billboard Social 50 chart. Having amassed more than two billion streams thus far, Ben&Ben have been named the most-streamed Filipino artist of all time on Spotify. Beyond music, they promote causes such as mental health, environmental awareness, and digital well-being.

== History ==
=== 2016–2018: Formation and early years ===
Twin brothers Paolo and Miguel Benjamin Guico were members of a high school cover band, Deadline, formed during the 2000s. They started playing as part of an "after-school culture", performing music from groups such as Paramore, Yellowcard, and Urbandub, and joining several amateur band competitions. After graduating high school, the brothers attended De La Salle University. Their inherent familiarity with music devices, such as fixing loudspeakers, led them to major in engineering. They had been interested in a career in music and thought that this would prepare them for opportunities to pursue it at the same time. While at De La Salle, they auditioned for a Battle of the Bands contest but failed to make it past the first round. Disillusioned by this, the brothers decided to take a hiatus from music altogether to focus on their studies. During this period, they became more involved with extracurricular activities; Miguel was part of an events and production group, while Paolo was a member of the student body.

Around that time, Paolo answered an advertisement on Facebook for Elements Music Camp, a songwriting workshop mentored by Filipino musicians, including Gloc-9, Noel Cabangon, Joey Ayala, and Rey Valera. They considered their participation a "cathartic experience", adding that it prompted a transformative shift in their perspective on music and life. Elements Music Camp was influential in shaping the brothers' musicianship; in addition to honing their songwriting process, it gave them confidence as singers. They graduated from De La Salle in 2016 and formed the Benjamins, taken from their second given names. In the same year, they began songwriting and took part in the Philippine Popular Music Festival, becoming the youngest finalists at age 21. They wrote "Tinatangi", a song about "life's different phases" which infused folk music and featured lyrics rooted in kundiman. A collaboration with singers Bayang Barrios and Cooky Chua, the piece won third place and was awarded Best Music Video.

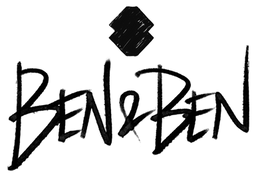
The wordmark logo of Ben&Ben

During this time, the duo worked with several different sound engineers and songwriters, including tribal leaders as sources of inspiration; they subsequently took the name Ben&Ben. In partnership with Warner Music Philippines, Ben&Ben released their first effort, an eponymous extended play (EP), on December 17, 2016. Although the two recorded their material with the aid of layered sound and audio mixing elements, they faced challenges replicating this in a live setting. Prior to their stage debut on Rappler's Live Jam, the duo invited a small group of musicians to perform with them, adding Poch Barretto as electric guitarist, Jam Villanueva as drummer, Agnes Reoma as bassist, Patricia Lasaten as keyboardist, Toni Muñoz and Andrew de Pano as percussionists, as well as Keifer Cabugao as violinist. Six of the additions have previously studied music; Muñoz, Lasaten, and Reoma majored in music composition, Barretto and Villanueva earned music business management degrees, and De Pano is a graduate of music education. Conversely, Cabugao is the only one to have a non-music major, having attended business school. The group continued playing live performances together for several months, and on May 10, 2017, Ben&Ben were officially formed as a nine-member ensemble. "Leaves", Ben&Ben EP's single, helped the band rise to prominence after it had been streamed more than one million times on Spotify. Their next release, "Kathang Isip", was heralded by Billboard Philippines as a "game-changer", highlighting its "melodramatic crooning ... heart-tugging instrumentals ... [and] soaring, cathartic chorus". It was nominated for Song of the Year at the Myx Music Awards. At the 2018 Aliw Awards, Ben&Ben were named Best New Artist – Group. That same year, the band was featured on several soundtracks, performing "Susi" for the biopic Goyo: Ang Batang Heneral, "Maybe The Night" for the romantic drama Exes Baggage, and "Balik-Balikan" for the television series Coke Studio Homecoming.

=== 2019–present: Breakthrough and success ===
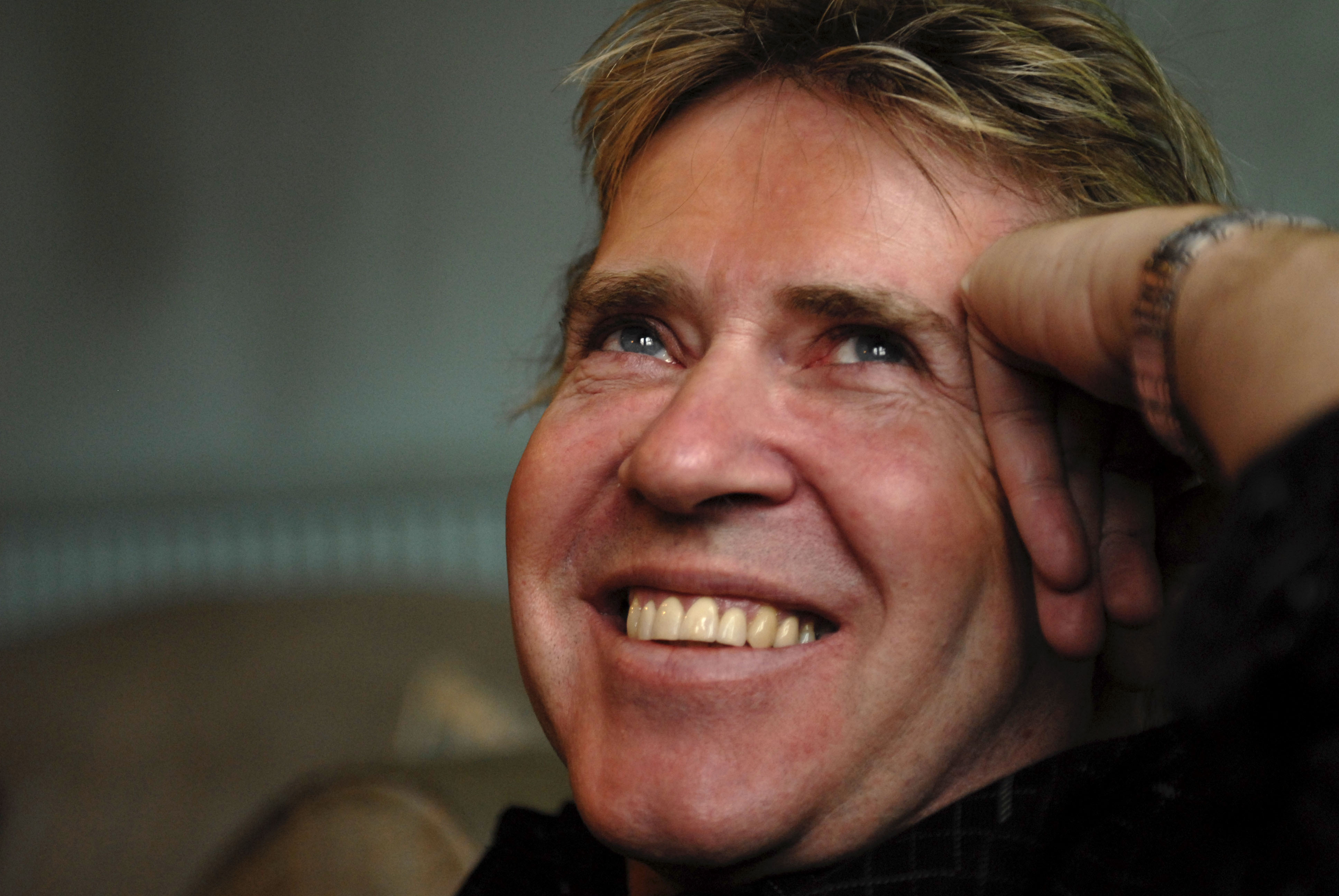
Steve Lillywhite produced the title track for Limasawa Street, incorporating elements influenced by his work with Irish rock band U2.

In the first half of 2019, Ben&Ben signed a record deal with Sony Music Philippines and began work on their debut studio album Limasawa Street. They first paired with British producer Steve Lillywhite, known for his work with U2 and Dave Matthews Band, for the album's title track. The song, heavily influenced by rock, drew its stylistic inspiration from Lillywhite's production with U2's the Edge. The band found Lillywhite to be very encouraging and creative; Paolo cited that working with the producer had significant impact on the album's output overall. The record also fused elements from Motown and soul music, among others.

Preceded by the singles "Araw-Araw" and "Pagtingin", Limasawa Street was released on May 10, 2019, to critical acclaim; Karla Rule of The Philippine Star praised the themes represented on the album for its emotional engagement to a wider audience, while a reviewer from the Manila Bulletin concluded, "With Limasawa Street, Ben&Ben not only proves they are one of the premier bands of the day, but they have enough creativity and depth to be in this for the long haul". To promote the album, the band embarked on their Limasawa Street Tour which ran from May to August 2019, encompassing 12 shows. The album was certified 4× platinum by the Philippine Association of the Record Industry. Ben&Ben won multiple accolades for their work; it was named Favorite Album of the Year at the 2020 Awit Awards, and "Pagtingin" earned the awards for Best Performance by a Group Recording Artist and Favorite Song of the Year. The single "Araw-Araw" was curated for the soundtrack of the romantic film Last Song Syndrome (2019), and won a Star Award for Movie Theme Song of the Year. At the 2020 MTV Europe Music Awards, the band were nominated for Best Southeast Asian Act.

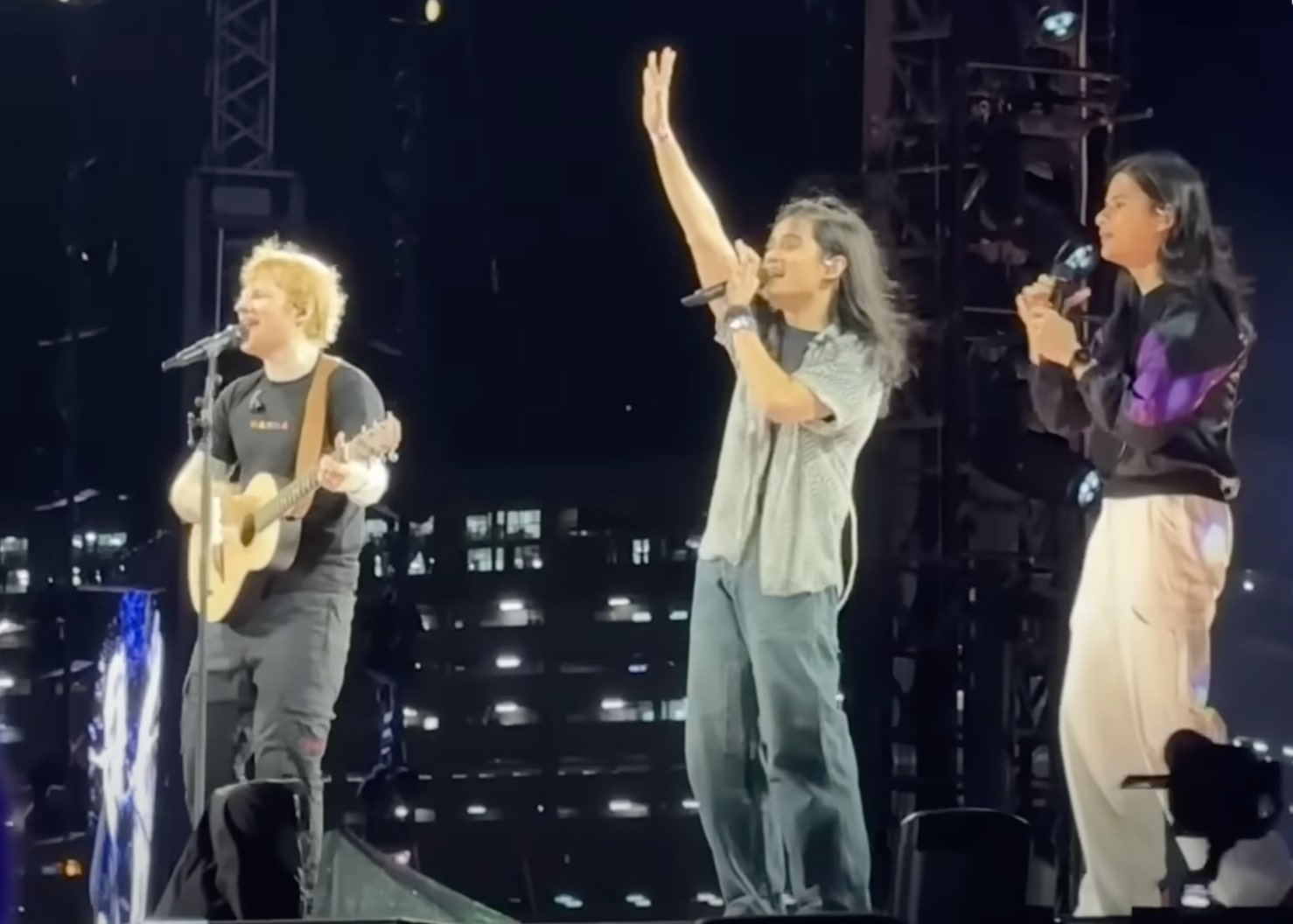
Ed Sheeran with the Guico brothers at the SMDC Festival Grounds on March 9, 2024

Following the outbreak of the COVID-19 pandemic, the band members lived together and conceived their second album Pebble House, Vol. 1: Kuwaderno. The title was inspired by the house in which they resided, and the album found the band experimenting with different narrative standpoints on the production. Conceptually, "kuwaderno" (lit. 'notebook') is an allusion to the music created from ideas chronicled in their "shared life under quarantine". Filipino musicians Chito Miranda, KZ Tandingan, Moira Dela Torre, Juan Karlos Labajo, and Zild appeared as guest performers. The completed album garnered critical praise upon its release in 2021, (Note: Attributed to multiple references:) with NME listing Pebble House, Vol. 1: Kuwaderno as one of the "25 best Asian albums" of the year. Rick Olivares of ABS-CBNnews.com found its introspective essence timely for the pandemic and regarded its sound as a bold reinvention of Ben&Ben's artistry, while a critic from the BusinessMirror lauded the album's experimental production, emotional weight and reflective songwriting. The album's release was followed by a livestreaming concert which was filmed at the Araneta Coliseum and broadcast on December 5, 2021, via the web-based platform KTX.ph. At the 2022 Awit Awards, the album and its singles received 21 nominations and earned multiple wins, including Album of the Year. Ben&Ben were named Best Band from Asia at the 2022 NME Awards, in addition to a Best Album by an Asian Artist nomination.

Also in 2022, Ben&Ben headlined their first international tour which commenced in San Francisco, followed by a series of dates across North America. In early 2023, the band performed at several music festivals, including the Aurora Music Festival in Pampanga, three editions of 1MX Music Festival—London, Toronto, and Sydney—and the Clockenflap in Hong Kong. (Note: Attributed to multiple references:) Amidst their touring activities, the band were honored with the Best Choice Award at the 2023 Asia Artist Awards, alongside musicians such as Kang Daniel and NewJeans. Later that year, they debuted the songs "Autumn" and "Courage", and were featured on the soundtrack of the drama film Rewind, performing the single "Sa Susunod na Habang Buhay". On March 9, 2024, Ben&Ben opened for Ed Sheeran's +–=÷× Tour at the SMDC Festival Grounds in Parañaque, where Sheeran later invited Miguel and Paolo Guico on stage to perform "Maybe the Night" with him. A jukebox musical adaptation of the 2007 romance film One More Chance featured Ben&Ben's songs and premiered in April 2024 at the PETA Theater Center. In October 2024, Ben&Ben announced their third studio album, The Traveller Across Dimensions, set for release on November 29. In December 2025, Jam Villanueva announced that 2026 would be her last year being a member of the band. On September 9, 2026, the band announced the release of their upcoming album Nine through their socials. They released it on September 24, 2026.

== Artistry ==
=== Influences ===
Ben&Ben have named British rock band Coldplay as their main influence and biggest inspiration. They admire how the group have diversified their sound and explored many musical styles throughout their career, including "the breadth of themes they tackle in their songs, to the contrasts of their musical palette, all the way to making the most of music as a holistic experience". The brothers grew up listening to folk, rock, and jazz musicians, including Urbandub, Paramore, Joey Ayala, Johnoy Danao, Cynthia Alexander, and Franco. Lyrically, they acknowledged Filipino songwriters such as Noel Cabangon, Jungee Marcelo, Jazz Nicolas, and Ebe Dancel as mentors and primary influences for writing their early material. Band members Barretto, De Pano, and Muñoz have all covered songs of John Mayer, while Villanueva cites Nirvana, Radiohead, and the Foo Fighters as musical inspirations. Lasaten looks up to Paramore lead vocalist Hayley Williams, whose "pop punk musical artistry" she wishes to emulate. Cabugao was introduced to the music of former the Belle Brigade member Ethan Gruska through the latter's collaboration with Bon Iver, drawn to its "calm moody sound". In addition, the band are inspired by artists like Queen and the Beatles.

During production of Limasawa Street, the band cited influences from producer Steve Lillywhite's work with U2 and Dave Matthews Band, having collaborated with him on the album's title track and impressed by his "signature way of [audio] mixing" and creative treatment. For Pebble House, Vol. 1: Kuwaderno, they drew inspiration from musicians who are also band members such as Chito Miranda of Parokya ni Edgar, Zild Benitez from IV of Spades, Adj Jiao from Munimuni, and Juan Karlos Labajo from his namesake band, all of whom appeared on the album.

=== Musical style and themes ===
"Pagtingin" (2019)
A sample of the bridge and final chorus of "Pagtingin", a midtempo folk-pop song with lyrics inspired by the uncertainty of expressing feelings for someone. The track incorporates a layer of "gospel-style harmonies", intertwined with dynamic electric guitar and strings.

Ben&Ben's music has been described as indie folk, folk-pop, folk rock, pop rock, and Pinoy pop. (Note: Attributed to multiple references:) In 2016, during the brothers' participation in the Philippine Popular Music Festival songwriting competition, their work had characteristics of kundiman intertwined with folk-pop, which they asserted as an "all-out experimentation". Subsequently, a similar style was implemented into their first EP. Their first studio album, Limasawa Street, featured distinct song identities which were described as "folk-infused pop sound", "jazz-pop strains", and "world music-tinged". With Pebble House, Vol. 1: Kuwaderno, Ben&Ben further diversified their style; "Sabel" featured "sparse instrumentation, harmony, and handclaps", which incorporated melodic chants. Meanwhile, "Lunod" was considered to be inspired by rock opera. Later in their career, the band ventured into various music genres, exploring elements and melodies rooted in city pop, electronic music, and tropicalismo. A media critic from ABS-CBNnews.com commented that it "signal[ed] a new chapter of musical growth and evolution" in their career.

Ben&Ben's musical style is noted for its anthemic quality and emotional engagement that appeals to a wide range of audiences. (Note: Attributed to multiple references:) Juli Vivas of the Manila Bulletin opined that their "poignant lyricism and unique musicality" are rare among their peers, underscoring that the band "changed the landscape of Filipino pop for the better, ushering in what potentially could be the second golden age of the local music industry". The band's lyrics are known for their deep sentimental and emotional undertones, focusing on themes of loss, heartbreak and relationship, and the journey towards self-love. (Note: Attributed to multiple references:) They delved into the cathartic nature of life on their EP, and embraced romance and positivity on Limasawa Street. In a review of their live performance, the critic Rito Asilo from the Philippine Daily Inquirer wrote that the song "Pagtingin" capitalized on the "lead singers' soaring, soothing vocals and radio-ready musicality", while he lauded "Paninindigan Kita" and "Araw-Araw" for expressing "earnest devotion fueling their thematic content". Pebble House, Vol. 1: Kuwaderno was a departure from the dominant subjects of its predecessor. Influenced by the isolation during quarantine, Ben&Ben diverged from "typical romantic narratives in favor of social commentary", exploring themes of escapism, social issues, mental health, and feminism. The songs generally ruminate around a set of distinctive characters, such as empowered women, emotionally troubled individuals, and the ruling class. Esquire deemed the album to be "diverse yet surprisingly compact that expands the Ben&Ben sound".

Regarding their songwriting process, Ben&Ben explained that the foundation to their songs is attributed to "10% of writing and 90% listening". They stated that identifying with various music genres helped broaden their perspective as songwriters, asserting that their material are often drawn from life experiences. In an interview with Esquire, the band acknowledged a collaborative approach among its members: "It usually starts with a song idea from a single songwriter ... It could be as bare as a single line, or a fully written piece ... After everyone hears it, if the songwriter doesn't really have any specific ideas for how it'll be arranged, each person brings in their own ideas to the table".

== Advocacy ==
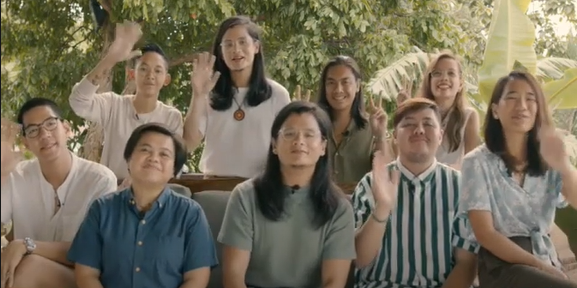
Ben&Ben during their appearance at the ROUND Festival in 2020

Ben&Ben's music—including collaborations with other musicians—has been known to address issues concerning mental health, feminism, social justice, and individualism. In 2021, the band favored writing songs that promote public awareness: "Kapangyarihan" tackles abuse of power, corruption, and police brutality, while "Sabel" amplified women empowerment. In addition, songs such as "Lunod" and "Magpahinga" talks about struggles with mental illness.

The band supports the LGBT community, and have spoken out against the discrimination faced by them, most notably criticizing inaccurate and sexist gender norms. On social media, Paolo Guico aimed to dispel "outdated prejudices" and voiced his support of "gender expression". In 2018, the band released the single "Maybe the Night", which was inspired by a lesbian couple and is a tribute to "celebrating all kinds of love". Ben&Ben are active supporters of recycling and are opposed to single-use products; they advocate for eco-friendly musical instruments. In 2019, the band were named National Geographic Asia's ambassador for its Planet or Plastic campaign, in recognition of their involvement in the rehabilitation of the Pasig River and reduction efforts to plastic pollution.

In the aftermath of the ABS-CBN broadcast cessation in May 2020, Ben&Ben donated proceeds from the sales of their single "Nakikinig Ka Ba Sa Akin" to employees affected by the subsequent mass layoffs. Amidst the COVID-19 pandemic, the band organized virtual benefit concerts to raise funds in support of frontline and healthcare workers, disadvantaged teachers and students affected by transition to e-learning, and efforts to provide COVID-19 testing. In December 2020, they participated as the Philippine representative at the ROUND Festival, a music event headlined by leading artists from South Korea and ASEAN member countries which advances music and culture in the region. In partnership with Google, Ben&Ben released the single "Mag-Ingat", which premiered in February 2022, and took part in Safer Internet Day to help promote digital safety and address online misinformation and cyberbullying.

On September 21, 2025, Ben&Ben performed their single "Kapangyarihan" (lit. 'Power'), a song about accountability, during the Trillion Peso March at the People Power Monument in Quezon City.

On April 19, 2026, Ben&Ben returned to ROUND Festival where they represented the Philippines again as the main act of day 2. They performed songs like Lifetime (reimagined) and Ride Home as well as Heaven, where they were joined by Thai band Tilly Birds.

== Accolades ==
Ben&Ben are considered one of the most successful bands of their generation. After their breakthrough, the band received the Aliw Award for Best New Artist – Group at the 2018 ceremony. In 2020, their debut album Limasawa Street won the Awit Award for Favorite Album of the Year. The single "Pagtingin" garnered the Awit Awards for Best Performance by a Group Recording Artist and Favorite Song of the Year, and the Star Award for Duo/Group Artist of the Year. The band were nominated for a MTV Europe Music Award in the same year. Their second studio album Pebble House, Vol. 1: Kuwaderno received a total of 21 Awit Award nominations, including a win for Album of the Year, at the 2021 ceremony. Having surpassed more than three billion streams to date, Ben&Ben were named by Spotify as the most-streamed Filipino artist of all time, in addition to being the most-streamed Filipino artist in 2020, 2021, and 2023.

== Band members ==
Current members

- Paolo Benjamin Guico – lead vocals, acoustic guitar (2016–present)
- Miguel Benjamin Guico – lead vocals, acoustic guitar (2016–present)
- Poch Barretto – lead guitar, backing vocals (2017–present)
- Agnes Reoma – bass guitar (2017–present)
- Andrew De Pano – percussion, backing vocals (2017–present)
- Toni Muñoz – percussion, lead and backing vocals (2017–present)
- Keifer Cabugao – violin, backing vocals (2017–present)
- Patricia Lasaten – keyboards (2017-present)

Former member

- Jam Villanueva – drums (2017–2026); percussion (2025-2026)

Sessionist

- Ted Mark Cruz - drums
- Eo Marcos - drums
- Luke Sigua - drums
- Alden Abaca - drums
- Karmi Santiago - drums

== Discography ==
- Limasawa Street (2019)
- Pebble House, Vol. 1: Kuwaderno (2021)
- The Traveller Across Dimensions (2024)
- Nine (2026)

== Filmography ==
| Year | Title | Role | Director | Producer | Ref(s) |
|---|---|---|---|---|---|
| 2019 | Last Song Syndrome | Cameo | No | Yes | |
