= Moira Dela Torre discography =

- Studio albums: 3
- EPs: 1
- Singles: 38
- Music videos: 9

Filipino singer-songwriter Moira Dela Torre has released three studio albums, one extended play (EPs), seventeen singles and nine music videos. She is the most streamed Filipino artist on Spotify history. Her debut album "Malaya" became the best-selling (8× Platinum) and most streamed album of 2018 in the Philippines. She is the only female OPM artist with the most digital platinum certifications (11). Her sophomore album "Patawad" was also a commercial success, achieving Platinum status the same year.

Her hit single Titibo-Tibo reached number one on Philippines Billboard Hot 100 for two consecutive weeks. In 2017, Dela Torre became the first OPM artist to top Spotify's Top 50 chart in the Philippines with "Titibo-tibo". Her best-selling single to date "Ikaw at Ako" had been certified 2× Platinum by PARI.

== Albums ==
=== Studio albums ===
Title	Album details	Sales	Certifications
Malaya	Released: February 19, 2018 (PH); Label: Star Music; Formats: CD, digital download	PHI: 120,000	PARI: 8× Platinum
Patawad	Released: March 27, 2020 (PH); Label: Star Music; Formats: CD, digital download	PHI: 15,000	PARI: Platinum
Halfway Point (Reimagined)	Released: October 22, 2021 (PH); Label: Self-released; Formats: Digital download		

== Extended plays ==
Title	EP details
Moira	Released: August 28, 2014 (PH); Label: Ivory Music; Formats: CD, digital download
Lost In Translation	Released: November 4, 2016 (PH); Label: Self-released; Formats: CD, digital download
Knots	Released: October 26, 2018 (PH); Label: Tarsier Records; Formats: CD, digital download

== Singles ==
List of singles, showing year released and album name
Title	Year	Album	Ref.
"Love Me Instead"	2014	Moira	
"Home"	2015	Non-album singles	
"Planes" (with Nieman Gatus)	2016	Lost In Translation	
"Malaya"	2017	Malaya	
"Be My Fairytale"	2017	Moira	
"Huling Gabi" (with Quest)	2017	Non-album singles	
"Tagpuan"	2018	Malaya	
"Huli na Ba Ang Lahat" (with IV of Spades)	2018	Wish 107.5 FM Bus	
"We Could Happen" (with AJ Rafael)	2018	Coke Studio Homecoming	
"My Sweet Escape"	2018	Coke Studio Homecoming	
"Knots" (with Nieman Gatus)	2018	Knots	
"Tell Nobody" (with Nieman Gatus)	2018	Knots	
"Distance" (with Nieman Gatus)	2018	Knots	
"Mabagal" (with Daniel Padilla)	2019	Himig Handog 2019	
"Mabagal" (with Daniel Padilla)	2019	Patawad	
"Ikaw at Ako" (with Jason Hernandez)	2019	Non-album singles	
"Patawad, Paalam" (with I Belong To The Zoo)	2019	Patawad	
"Paalam" (with Ben&Ben)	2019	Patawad	
"Unbreakable" (with Regine Velasquez-Alcasid)	2019	Patawad	
"Yakap"	2019	Non-album singles	
"Patawad"	2020	Patawad	
"Hanggang Sa Huli (From "24/7")"	2020	Patawad	
"Ikaw Pa Rin" (with Erik Santos)	2020	Patawad	
"May Pag-Asa" (with Jason Hernandez)	2020	Non-album singles	
"Beautiful" (with Ogie Alcasid)	2020	Non-album singles	
"Paubaya"	2020	Patawad (Deluxe Edition)	
"Kahit Kunwari Man Lang" (with Agsunta)	2020	Non-album singles	
"Di Panghabang-buhay" (with The Juans)	2021	Non-album singles	
"Pasalubong" (with Ben&Ben) (Note: The song is part of Ben&Ben's studio album Pebble House, Vol. 1: Kuwaderno.)	2021	Non-album singles	
"Pabilin"	2021	Non-album singles	
"Pagitan"	2021	Non-album singles	
"Iba" (with Zack Tabudlo)	2022	Non-album singles	
"Ipanalo Natin 'To"	2022	Non-album singles	
"Ikaw at Sila"	2023	Non-album singles	
"Eme"	2023	Non-album singles	
"Maria Clara"	2023	Non-album singles	
"Things You Said" (with Cody Fry)	2024	Non-album singles	
"Papahiram" (with Johnoy Danao)	2024	Non-album singles	
"San Ka Na"	2024	Non-album singles	

== Covers ==
List of covers, showing year released and album name
Title	Year	Album	Ref.
"Torete" (a cover from Moonstar88)	2017	Malaya	
"Sundo" (a cover from Imago)	2017	Malaya	
"You Are My Sunshine" (a cover from Jimmie Davis)	2018	Malaya	
"Anong Nangyari Sa Ating Dalawa" (a cover from Aiza Seguerra)	2018		
"Kahit Maputi Na Ang Buhok Ko" (a cover from Rey Valera)	2018		
"It Came Upon a Midnight Clear" (a cover from Edmund Sears, with AJ Rafael)	2018	Coke Studio Homecoming	
"Silent Night (Moira's Version)	2021		

== Chart performance ==
Title	Year	Peak chart positions	Description
Title	Year	PHL Songs (Note: The Billboard's Hits of the World chart launched and was first issued on the date February 19, 2022.)	Description
"Home"	2015	29	Released single
"Malaya"	2016	6	Camp Sawi
"Sundo"	2017	4	The Good Son
"Torete"	2017	1	Love You to the Stars and Back
"Titibo-tibo"	2017	1	2017 Himig Handog
"Kumpas"	2022	9	2 Good 2 Be True

== Soundtracks ==
Song	Year	Film/Show
"Malaya"	2016	Camp Sawi
"Marco's Theme (Saglit)"	2017	The Better Half
"Sundo"	2017	The Good Son
"Torete"	2017	Love You to the Stars and Back
"Huling Gabi"	2017	Last Night
"You Are My Sunshine"	2018	Meet Me in St. Gallen
"Kahit Maputi Na Ang Buhok Ko"	2018	The Hows of Us
"Before It Sinks In"	2018-2019	Pinoy Big Brother: Otso
"Ikaw At Ako"	2019	Hello, Love, Goodbye
"Unbreakable" (with Regine Velasquez-Alcasid)	2019	Unbreakable
"Hanggang sa Huli"	2020	24/7
"Kailangan Kita"	2021	La Vida Lena
"Kumpas"	2022	2 Good 2 Be True
"Dito Ka Lang" (In My Heart Filipino Version)	2022	Flower of Evil
"Babalik Sa'yo"	2022	2 Good 2 Be True
"Aking Habang Buhay"	2022	An Inconvenient Love
"Hilom"	2023	Unbreak My Heart
"You’ll Be Safe Here"	2023	Can’t Buy Me Love
"Your Universe"	2024	GG: Good Game
