= Your Face Sounds Familiar (Philippine TV series) season 3 =

Your Face Sounds Familiar
- Season 3
- Hosted by: Luis Manzano
- Judges: Gary Valenciano; Ogie Alcasid; Sharon Cuneta
- Winner: Klarisse de Guzman
- Runner-up: Lie Reposposa
- Finals venue: Studio 10, ABS-CBN Broadcasting Center, Diliman, Quezon City
- Companion show: KaFamiliar Online Live
- No. of episodes: 28

Release
- Original network: Kapamilya Channel; Kapamilya Online Live; A2Z
- Original release: February 20 – May 30, 2021

Season chronology
- ← Previous; Season 2 Next → Season 4

The third season of Your Face Sounds Familiar premiered on the Kapamilya Channel on February 20, 2021. The season is the first to air outside ABS-CBN after the network's shutdown and franchise denial in 2020. The season was presented by debuting host Luis Manzano while the jury was composed of Sharon Cuneta, Gary Valenciano, and Ogie Alcasid. Taped during the COVID-19 pandemic in the Philippines, the season was filmed without a live audience and was subject to a number of health and safety protocols.

Klarisse de Guzman was named as the winner at the season finale held on May 30, 2021, attaining a total combined score of 90%. This season was also the first to implement the scoring system used in the finales of the Kids editions.

== Format ==
The show follows a competition where celebrity performers are tasked to impersonate any icon, living or dead, regardless of their age, race or gender. A three-person jury ranks the contestants, with their cumulative points being combined with points given by the performers amongst themselves to determine a winner for that week.

== Contestants ==
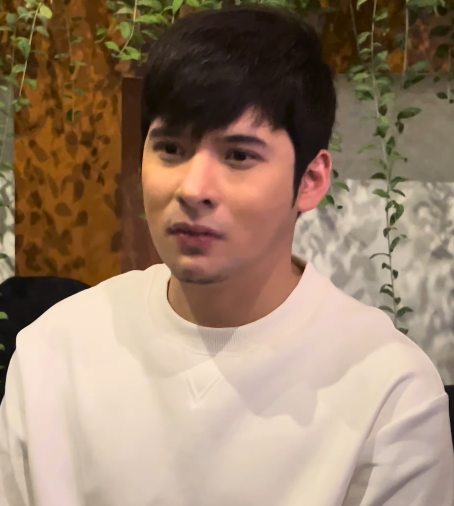
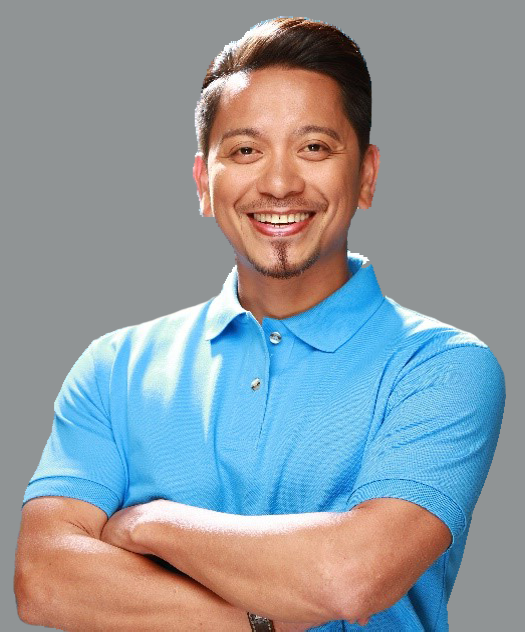
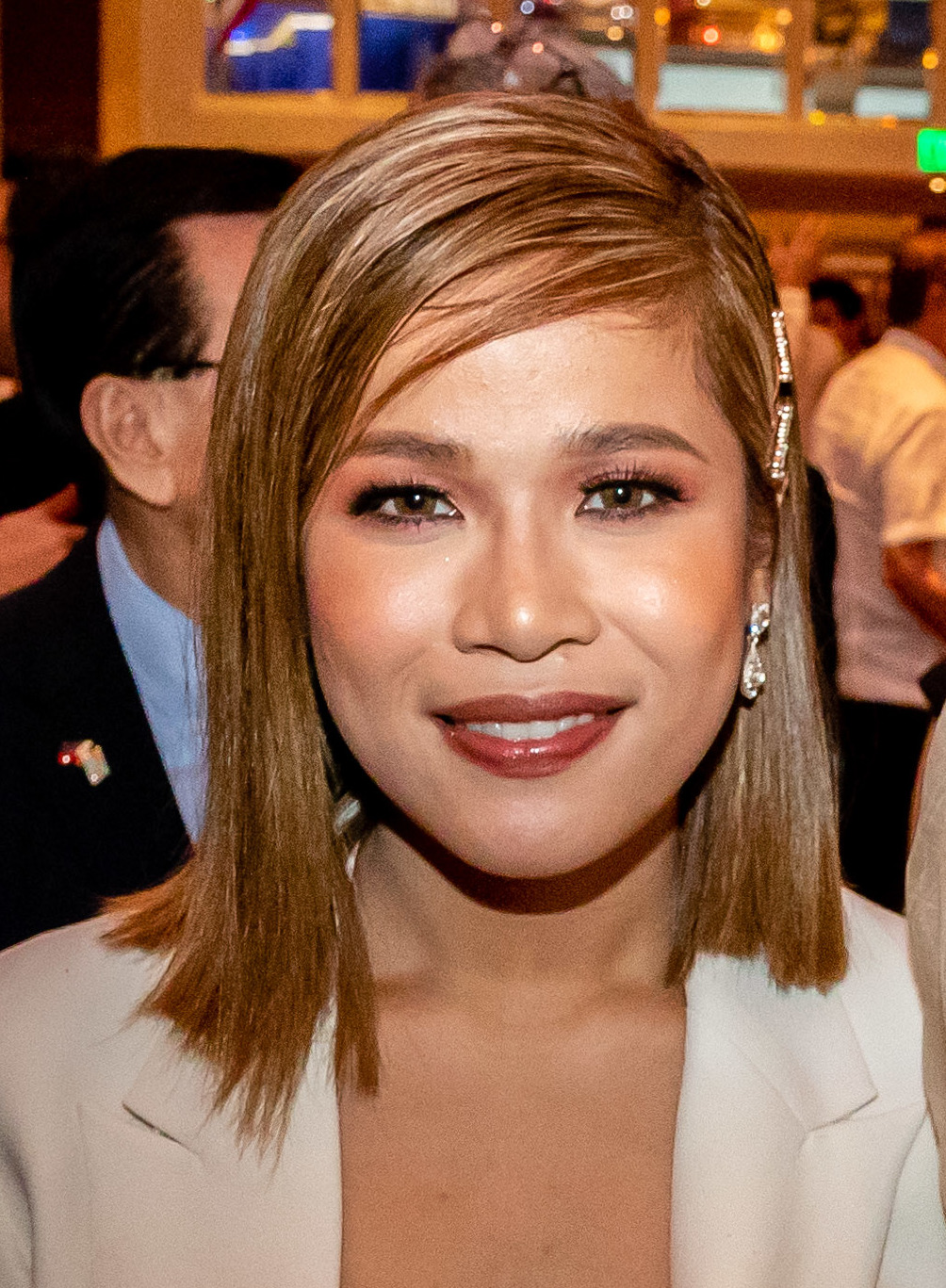
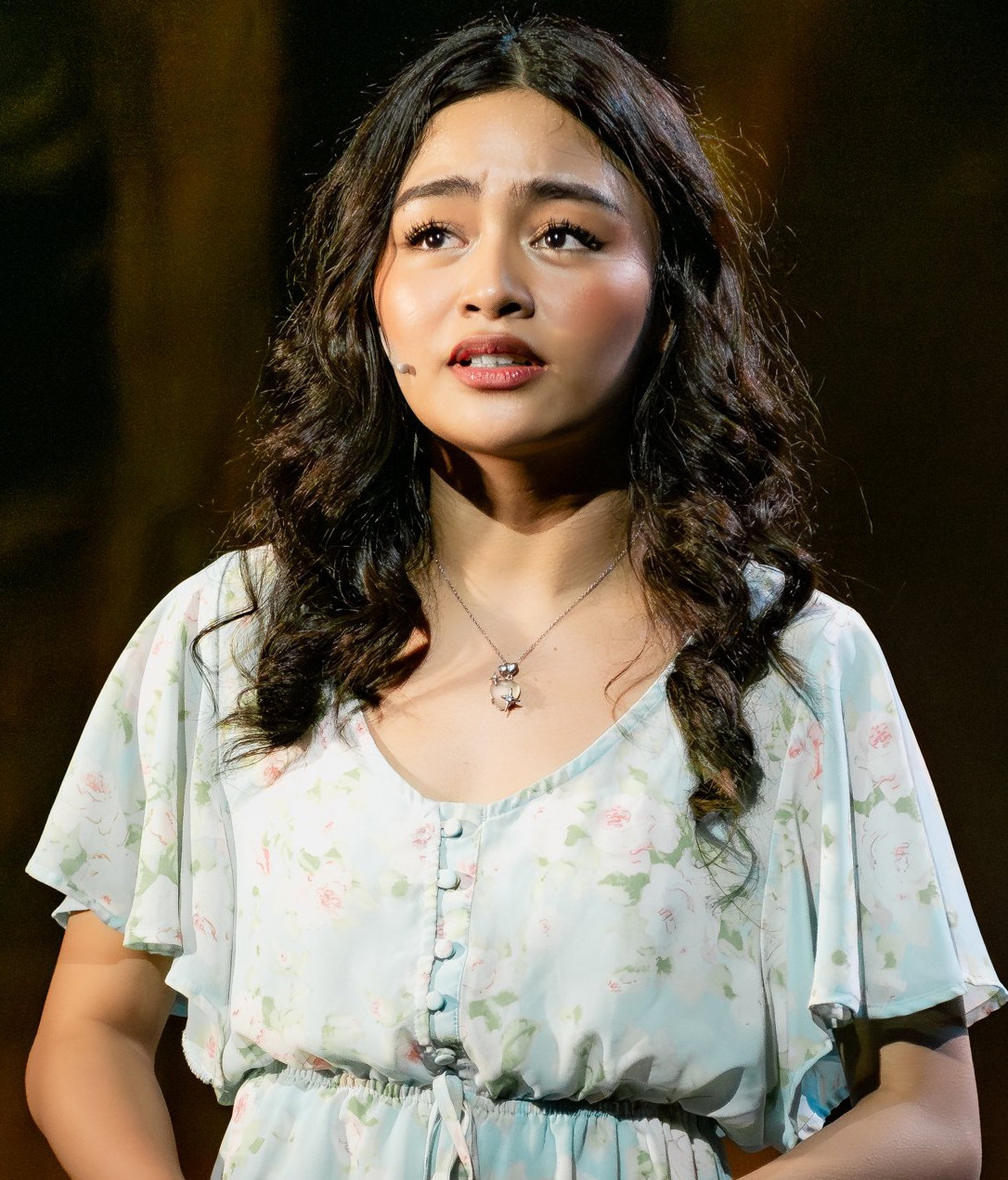
From left to right: Christian Bables, Enzo Almario of iDolls, Jhong Hilario (withdrew), Klarisse de Guzman, Vivoree Esclito

The contestants and their monikers were revealed on February 4, 2021. Jhong Hilario decided to withdraw on Week 7, becoming the first to do so in the show's history, leaving seven performers competing for the grand prize from then on.

Celebrity performers of Your Face Sounds Familiar 3
Contestant	Notability	Result
Klarisse de Guzman	Singer	Winner (4 wins, 253 points)
Lie Reposposa	Singer and Pinoy Big Brother Housemate	Second Place (1 win, 154 points)
Vivoree Esclito	Singer and actress	Third Place (1 win, 169 points)
iDolls (Enzo Almario, Lucas Garcia and Matty Juniosa)	Singers	Fourth Place (1 win, 189 points)
Christian Bables	Actor and singer	Fifth Place (1 win, 168 points)
CJ Navato	Singer and actor	Sixth Place (1 win, 174 points)
Geneva Cruz	Singer	Seventh Place (1 win, 136 points)
Jhong Hilario	Dancer and actor	Withdrew (2 wins, 107 points)

=== Future appearances ===
Matty Juniosa of iDolls later auditioned in series 19 of Britain's Got Talent, where he received a golden buzzer from Simon Cowell.

== Results summary ==
Legend

- Winner
- Runner-up
- Third place
- Fourth place
- Fifth place
- Sixth place
- Seventh place
- Final total points
- Contestant won that particular week
- Contestant placed last that particular week
- Contestant was not able to perform that particular week
- Contestant withdrew from the competition

Contestant	Week 1	Week 2	Week 3	Week 4	Week 5	Week 6	Week 7	Week 8	Week 9	Week 10	Week 11	Week 12	Final Total Points	Finals
Klarisse	4th 19 points	4th-5th 18 points	1st 39 points	4th 17 points	1st 30 points	3rd 21 points	3rd 15 points	2nd 20 points	1st 26 points	2nd-3rd 19 points	1st 24 points	7th 5 points	1st 253 points	Winner; 90.00%
Lie	2nd 23 points	8th 6 points	8th 4 points	8th 6 points	7th-8th 9 points	5th 15 points	2nd 16 points	1st 28 points	5th 7 points	6th 8 points	4th-5th 13 points	2nd 19 points	6th 154 points	2nd Place; 80.43%
Vivoree	8th 3 points	7th 13 points	2nd 27 points	6th 9 points	7th-8th 9 points	1st 33 points	5th 12 points	3rd-4th 9 points	3rd-4th 13 points	4th 15 points	4th-5th 13 points	4th 13 points	4th 169 points	3rd Place; 78.40%
iDolls	7th 10 points	2nd 20 points	6th 11 points	3rd 19 points	6th 10 points	2nd 24 points	1st 21 points	3rd-4th 9 points	2nd 16 points	2nd-3rd 19 points	2nd 21 points	5th 9 points	2nd 189 points	4th Place; 72.35%
Christian	6th 12 points	3rd 19 points	4th 13 points	5th 10 points	3rd 23 points	7th 8 points	4th 14 points	6th 7 points	6th 6 points	1st 30 points	6th 12 points	3rd 14 points	5th 168 points	5th Place; 63.20%
CJ	3rd 22 points	4th-5th 18 points	3rd 16 points	1st 38 points	2nd 24 points	8th 4 points	6th 3 points	5th 8 points	3rd-4th 13 points	7th 3 points	3rd 19 points	6th 6 points	3rd 174 points	6th Place; 59.39%
Geneva	5th 18 points	6th 17 points	7th 10 points	7th 8 points	5th 12 points	4th 18 points	Could Not; Perform			5th 11 points	7th 3 points	1st 39 points	7th 136 points	7th Place; 46.88%
Jhong	1st 25 points	1st 21 points	5th 12 points	2nd 25 points	4th 15 points	6th 9 points	Withdrew						8th 107 points	Withdrew (Week 7)

== Performances ==
The eight performances are divided into two nights – the first four contestants perform on Saturdays and the remaining four on Sundays.

Color key

- Contestant won that particular week
- Contestant placed last that particular week

=== Week 1 (February 20 & 21) ===
Episode Hashtag

- #YourFacePH2021 (Saturday)
- #YFSFKaFamiliarForever (Sunday)

Episode	Order	Contestant	Performance	Points				Total	Rank
Episode	Order	Contestant	Performance	Gary	Sharon	Ogie	Others	Total	Rank
Episode 1 (February 20)	1	iDolls	Bernie Fineza, Sonny Parsons and Mike Respall of Hagibis – "Katawan"	4	2	4	0	10	7th
Episode 1 (February 20)	2	Vivoree Esclito	Sarah Geronimo – "Tala"	1	1	1	0	3	8th
Episode 1 (February 20)	3	Klarisse de Guzman	Christina Aguilera – "Dirrty"	6	6	7	0	19	4th
Episode 1 (February 20)	4	Jhong Hilario	apl.de.ap of Black Eyed Peas – "Bebot"	7	7	8	3	25	1st
Episode 2 (February 21)	5	Christian Bables	Adam Levine of Maroon 5 – "Sugar"	3	3	6	0	12	6th
Episode 2 (February 21)	6	Lie Reposposa	Moira Dela Torre – "Titibo-Tibo"	8	4	2	9	23	2nd
Episode 2 (February 21)	7	CJ Navato	Jose Mari Chan – "Beautiful Girl"	5	5	3	9	22	3rd
Episode 2 (February 21)	8	Geneva Cruz	Jennifer Lopez – "On the Floor"	2	8	5	3	18	5th

=== Week 2 (February 27 & 28) ===
Episode Hashtag

- #YFSF3KaFUNabik (Saturday)
- #YFSF3FUNaloTo (Sunday)

Non-competition performance

- Luis Manzano as Andrew E. – "Andrew Ford Medina"

Episode	Order	Contestant	Performance	Points				Total	Rank
Episode	Order	Contestant	Performance	Gary	Sharon	Ogie	Others	Total	Rank
Episode 3 (February 27)	1	Jhong Hilario	Bamboo Mañalac of Bamboo – "Tatsulok"	8	8	5	0	21	1st
Episode 3 (February 27)	2	iDolls	Beyoncé, Anika Noni Rose and Sharon Leal of Dreamgirls – "One Night Only"	7	7	6	0	20	2nd
Episode 3 (February 27)	3	Geneva Cruz	Pilita Corrales – "Kapantay Ay Langit"	3	4	4	6	17	6th
Episode 3 (February 27)	4	Lie Reposposa	Whitney Houston – "I Wanna Dance with Somebody (Who Loves Me)"	2	1	3	0	6	8th
Episode 4 (February 28)	5	Klarisse de Guzman	Shakira – "Whenever, Wherever"	6	5	7	0	18	4th-5th
Episode 4 (February 28)	6	CJ Navato	Frank Sinatra – "Fly Me to the Moon"	4	3	2	9	18	4th-5th
Episode 4 (February 28)	7	Vivoree Esclito	Geneva Cruz of Smokey Mountain – "Kailan"	1	2	1	9	13	7th
Episode 4 (February 28)	8	Christian Bables	Cher – "Strong Enough"	5	6	8	0	19	3rd

=== Week 3 (March 6 & 7) ===
Episode Hashtag

- #YFSF3FUNtastic (Saturday)
- #YFSF3FUNmalakasan (Sunday)

Episode	Order	Contestant	Performance	Points				Total	Rank
Episode	Order	Contestant	Performance	Gary	Sharon	Ogie	Others	Total	Rank
Episode 5 (March 6)	1	Christian Bables	Justin Timberlake – "SexyBack"	4	5	4	0	13	4th
Episode 5 (March 6)	2	Klarisse de Guzman	Jaya – "Hanggang Dito Na Lang"	8	8	8	15	39	1st
Episode 5 (March 6)	3	Geneva Cruz	Sheryl Cruz – "Mr. Dreamboy"	5	2	3	0	10	7th
Episode 5 (March 6)	4	iDolls	Earth, Wind & Fire – "September"	3	3	2	3	11	6th
Episode 6 (March 7)	5	Jhong Hilario	Enrique Iglesias – "Bailamos"	1	6	5	0	12	5th
Episode 6 (March 7)	6	Vivoree Esclito	Camila Cabello – "Havana"	7	7	7	6	27	2nd
Episode 6 (March 7)	7	CJ Navato	Rico J. Puno – "Macho Gwapito"	6	4	6	0	16	3rd
Episode 6 (March 7)	8	Lie Reposposa	April Boy Regino – "Umiiyak ang Puso"	2	1	1	0	4	8th

=== Week 4 (March 13 & 14) ===
Episode Hashtag

- #YFSFWomanPower (Saturday)
- #YFSFLakasNgPinay (Sunday)

Non-competition performance

- Ogie Alcasid as himself as Eydie Waw – "Maga Ako, Manas Ako"

Episode	Order	Contestant	Performance	Points				Total	Rank
Episode	Order	Contestant	Performance	Gary	Sharon	Ogie	Others	Total	Rank
Episode 7 (March 13)	1	Jhong Hilario	Tina Turner – "Proud Mary"	7	8	7	3	25	2nd
Episode 7 (March 13)	2	Christian Bables	Vina Morales – "Pangako Sa'yo"	3	4	3	0	10	5th
Episode 7 (March 13)	3	Vivoree Esclito	Kim Chiu – "Bawal Lumabas" (Note: Although the original version of "Bawal Lumabas" played in the iconizer, the Brian Cua Summer Anthem Mix arrangement was used in the performance.)	2	3	1	3	9	6th
Episode 7 (March 13)	4	Klarisse de Guzman	Britney Spears – "Oops!... I Did It Again"	6	6	5	0	17	4th
Episode 8 (March 14)	5	iDolls	Christina Aguilera, Mýa and P!nk – "Lady Marmalade"	5	5	6	3	19	3rd
Episode 8 (March 14)	6	Geneva Cruz	Dua Lipa – "New Rules"	4	2	2	0	8	7th
Episode 8 (March 14)	7	CJ Navato	Justin Bieber – "Love Yourself"	8	7	8	15	38	1st
Episode 8 (March 14)	8	Lie Reposposa	Donna Summer – "Last Dance"	1	1	4	0	6	8th

=== Week 5 (March 20 & 21) ===
Episode Hashtag

- #YFSFLakas (Saturday)
- #YFSFiba (Sunday)

Episode	Order	Contestant	Performance	Points				Total	Rank
Episode	Order	Contestant	Performance	Gary	Sharon	Ogie	Others	Total	Rank
Episode 9 (March 20)	1	CJ Navato	Alanis Morissette – "Ironic"	7	7	7	3	24	2nd
Episode 9 (March 20)	2	Vivoree Esclito	Selena Gomez – "I Want You to Know"	3	2	1	3	9	7th-8th
Episode 9 (March 20)	3	Klarisse de Guzman	Minnie Riperton – "Lovin' You"	8	8	8	6	30	1st
Episode 9 (March 20)	4	Jhong Hilario	Vhong Navarro – "Totoy Bibo"	4	6	5	0	15	4th
Episode 10 (March 21)	5	iDolls	The Pointer Sisters – "I'm So Excited"	1	4	2	3	10	6th
Episode 10 (March 21)	6	Lie Reposposa	Sheryn Regis – "Kailan Kaya"	2	1	3	3	9	7th-8th
Episode 10 (March 21)	7	Geneva Cruz	Madonna – "Borderline"	5	3	4	0	12	5th
Episode 10 (March 21)	8	Christian Bables	Francis Magalona – "Ito Ang Gusto Ko"	6	5	6	6	23	3rd

=== Week 6 (March 27 & 28) ===
Episode hashtag

- #YFSFHOTawNa (Saturday)
- #YFSFSlayCation (Sunday)

Episode	Order	Contestant	Performance	Points				Total	Rank
Episode	Order	Contestant	Performance	Gary	Sharon	Ogie	Others	Total	Rank
Episode 11 (March 27)	1	CJ Navato	Barry Manilow – "Copacabana"	2	1	1	0	4	8th
Episode 11 (March 27)	2	Jhong Hilario	Bob Marley of Bob Marley & the Wailers – "Waiting in Vain"	3	3	3	0	9	6th
Episode 11 (March 27)	3	Lie Reposposa	Lolita Carbon of Asin – "Usok"	4	4	4	3	15	5th
Episode 11 (March 27)	4	Klarisse de Guzman	Mariah Carey – "Through the Rain"	5	6	7	3	21	3rd
Episode 12 (March 28)	5	Christian Bables	Michael Jackson – "Rock with You"	1	2	2	3	8	7th
Episode 12 (March 28)	6	Geneva Cruz	Freddie Aguilar – "Estudyante Blues"	8	5	5	0	18	4th
Episode 12 (March 28)	7	iDolls	Boyz II Men – "The Color of Love"	6	7	8	3	24	2nd
Episode 12 (March 28)	8	Vivoree Esclito	Rihanna – "Shut Up and Drive"	7	8	6	12	33	1st

=== Week 7 (April 17 & 18) ===
Owing to the inability to press the iconizer in the previous weeks, the icons were revealed through the show's social media accounts without revealing who the icon was assigned to.

Jhong announced his withdrawal from the show on April 17, 2021, to care for his newborn daughter, leaving the show with 107 points and two weekly wins. Geneva was not able to perform for this week and the following three weeks following her mother's exposure and subsequent death to COVID-19. Due to the absences, the highest score a member of the jury can give to a contestant is 6.

With Jhong's withdrawal, the format was re-adjusted, four contestants performed during Saturdays and the remaining three during Sundays.

Episode hashtag

- #YFSFCelebration (Saturday)
- #YFSFPambansangParty (Sunday)

Guest Juror

- Jed Madela (substitute for Sharon Cuneta)

Non-competition performance

- Nyoy Volante as Vilma Santos - "Breaking Up Is Hard To Do" by Neil Sedaka

Episode	Order	Contestant	Performance	Points				Total	Rank
Episode	Order	Contestant	Performance	Gary	Jed	Ogie	Others	Total	Rank
Episode 13 (April 17)	1	iDolls	Bryan Adams, Rod Stewart and Sting – "All for Love"	5	5	5	6	21	1st
Episode 13 (April 17)	2	CJ Navato	Axl Rose of Guns N'Roses – "Sweet Child O' Mine"	1	1	1	0	3	6th
Episode 13 (April 17)	3	Lie Reposposa	Yeng Constantino – "Cool Off"	6	4	6	0	16	2nd
Episode 13 (April 17)	4	Vivoree Esclito	Jolina Magdangal – "Chuva Choo Choo"	3	3	3	3	12	5th
Episode 14 (April 18)	5	Christian Bables	Vice Ganda – "Karakaraka"	2	2	4	6	14	4th
Episode 14 (April 18)	6	Klarisse de Guzman	Tom Jones – "It's Not Unusual"	4	6	2	3	15	3rd

=== Week 8 (April 24 & 25) ===
Due to being slightly ill at the time of taping, Sharon Cuneta appeared virtually through a remote work setup via Zoom. This would continue on the following week.

Episode hashtag

- #YFSFGoodVibes (Saturday)
- #YFSFHotHotHot (Sunday)

Non-competition performances

- Jed Madela as Boy George of Culture Club - "Karma Chameleon"
- Gary Valenciano - "Make Us Whole Again"

Episode	Order	Contestant	Performance	Points				Total	Rank
Episode	Order	Contestant	Performance	Gary	Sharon	Ogie	Others	Total	Rank
Episode 15 (April 24)	1	iDolls	APO Hiking Society – "Panalangin"	4	1	4	0	9	3rd-4th
Episode 15 (April 24)	2	Vivoree Esclito	Janet Jackson – "All for You"	3	3	3	0	9	3rd-4th
Episode 15 (April 24)	3	Christian Bables	Michael Bublé – "Sway"	1	2	1	3	7	6th
Episode 15 (April 24)	4	Klarisse de Guzman	Lani Misalucha – "Bukas Na Lang Kita Mamahalin"	5	6	6	3	20	2nd
Episode 16 (April 25)	5	CJ Navato	Iñigo Pascual – "Dahil Sa'yo"	2	4	2	0	8	5th
Episode 16 (April 25)	6	Lie Reposposa	Elizabeth Ramsey – "Waray Waray"	6	5	5	12	28	1st

=== Week 9 (May 1 & 2) ===
Episode hashtag

- #YFSFWerkIt (Saturday)
- #YFSFBilib (Sunday)

Non-competition performance

- Ogie Alcasid as himself as Ban Sot Mee - "Tabakoo Na Bes"

Episode	Order	Contestant	Performance	Points				Total	Rank
Episode	Order	Contestant	Performance	Gary	Sharon	Ogie	Others	Total	Rank
Episode 17 (May 1)	1	Christian Bables	James Reid – "Cool Down"	3	1	2	0	6	6th
Episode 17 (May 1)	2	iDolls	Dionne Warwick, Elton John and Stevie Wonder – "That's What Friends Are For"	6	5	5	0	16	2nd
Episode 17 (May 1)	3	Lie Reposposa	Celine Dion – "It's All Coming Back to Me Now"	1	3	3	0	7	5th
Episode 17 (May 1)	4	CJ Navato	Gary Valenciano – "Ililigtas Ka Niya"	2	4	1	6	13	3rd-4th
Episode 18 (May 2)	5	Vivoree Esclito	Billie Eilish – "Bad Guy"	4	2	4	3	13	3rd-4th
Episode 18 (May 2)	6	Klarisse de Guzman	Sharon Cuneta – "Sana'y Wala Nang Wakas"	5	6	6	9	26	1st

=== Week 10 (May 8 & 9) ===
After three weeks of her absence, Geneva returned to the competition. Her icon was revealed via a television screen in the training room as she was not able to press the iconizer in the previous weeks.

Episode hashtag

- #YFSFLevelUp (Saturday)
- #YFSFInaAbangan (Sunday)

Non-competition performance

- Darren Espanto - "Hataw Na" by Gary Valenciano

Episode	Order	Contestant	Performance	Points				Total	Rank
Episode	Order	Contestant	Performance	Gary	Sharon	Ogie	Others	Total	Rank
Episode 19 (May 8)	1	iDolls	98 Degrees – "Because of You"	6	5	5	3	19	2nd-3rd
Episode 19 (May 8)	2	Klarisse de Guzman	Ann Wilson of Heart – "These Dreams"	4	6	6	3	19	2nd-3rd
Episode 19 (May 8)	3	CJ Navato	Michael Bolton – "How Am I Supposed to Live Without You"	1	1	1	0	3	7th
Episode 19 (May 8)	4	Vivoree Esclito	Avril Lavigne – "Girlfriend"	5	4	3	3	15	4th
Episode 20 (May 9)	5	Lie Reposposa	Imelda Papin – "Isang Linggong Pag-ibig"	3	3	2	0	8	6th
Episode 20 (May 9)	6	Christian Bables	Mike Hanopol of Juan de la Cruz Band – "Laki sa Layaw"	7	7	7	9	30	1st
Episode 20 (May 9)	7	Geneva Cruz	Toni Braxton – "Breathe Again"	2	2	4	3	11	5th

=== Week 11 (May 15 & 16) ===
Episode hashtag

- #YFSFFuntastic (Saturday)
- #YFSFFeelGoodPilipinas (Sunday)

Non-competition performance

- AC Bonifacio - TikTok Hits

Episode	Order	Contestant	Performance	Points				Total	Rank
Episode	Order	Contestant	Performance	Gary	Sharon	Ogie	Others	Total	Rank
Episode 21 (May 15)	1	Lie Reposposa	Sampaguita – "Bonggahan"	4	3	3	3	13	4th-5th
Episode 21 (May 15)	2	iDolls	Moira Dela Torre with Paolo and Miguel Guico of Ben&Ben – "Paalam"	6	5	4	6	21	2nd
Episode 21 (May 15)	3	Klarisse de Guzman	Aretha Franklin – "Respect"	7	6	5	6	24	1st
Episode 21 (May 15)	4	Geneva Cruz	Selena – "Dreaming of You"	1	1	1	0	3	7th
Episode 22 (May 16)	5	Vivoree Esclito	Miley Cyrus – "Party in the U.S.A."	3	4	6	0	13	4th-5th
Episode 22 (May 16)	6	Christian Bables	Alice Cooper – "I Never Cry"	2	2	2	6	12	6th
Episode 22 (May 16)	7	CJ Navato	John Legend – "All of Me"	5	7	7	0	19	3rd

=== Week 12 (May 22 & 23) ===
Episode hashtag

- #YFSFShowstoppers (Saturday)
- #YFSFRoadToFinale (Sunday)

Episode	Order	Contestant	Performance	Points				Total	Rank
Episode	Order	Contestant	Performance	Gary	Sharon	Ogie	Others	Total	Rank
Episode 23 (May 22)	1	Klarisse de Guzman	Toni Basil – "Mickey"	3	1	1	0	5	7th
Episode 23 (May 22)	2	iDolls	Paul Stanley, Gene Simmons and Ace Frehley of Kiss – "Rock and Roll All Nite"	4	2	3	0	9	5th
Episode 23 (May 22)	3	Vivoree Esclito	Usher – "Yeah!"	5	4	4	0	13	4th
Episode 23 (May 22)	4	CJ Navato	Steven Tyler of Aerosmith – "I Don't Want to Miss a Thing"	1	3	2	0	6	6th
Episode 24 (May 23)	5	Lie Reposposa	KZ Tandingan – "Marupok"	6	5	5	3	19	2nd
Episode 24 (May 23)	6	Christian Bables	Nicki Minaj – "Super Bass"	2	6	6	0	14	3rd
Episode 24 (May 23)	7	Geneva Cruz	Liza Minnelli – "Cabaret"	7	7	7	18	39	1st

=== Finals: Week 13 (May 29 & 30) ===
For the first time in the mainline series, all of the remaining seven contestants perform in the grand showdown. For the week, the contestants will select the icons they impersonate. The winner is determined by a composite score of the final total points accumulated throughout the competition and public votes cast during the finale broadcast. The finale was held in Studio 10, ABS-CBN Broadcasting Center with a virtual audience instead of a live audience due to the COVID-19 restrictions at that time.

As Sharon Cuneta was on her vacation at the time of the Grand Showdown, she appeared virtually through a remote work setup via Zoom.

During the second night, Vice Ganda appeared on the show to promote their then-upcoming series "Everybody, Sing!" which premiered on June 5, 2021.

Episode Hashtag

- #YFSFGrandShowdown (Saturday)
- #YFSFGrandWinner (Sunday)

Non-competition performances

May 29

- Nyoy Volante, Jed Madela, Ogie Alcasid, Gary Valenciano, AC Bonifacio and the finalists – "Feel This Moment" by Pitbull featuring Christina Aguilera/"Good Time" by Owl City and Carly Rae Jepsen

May 30

- Vice Ganda and Regine Velasquez – "Crazy for You" by Madonna

Episode	Order	Finalist	Performance	Score			Rank
Episode	Order	Finalist	Performance	Total Points	Vote Percentage	Total Score	Rank
Episode 25 (May 29)	1	iDolls	Luciano Pavarotti, Plácido Domingo and José Carreras of The Three Tenors – "La donna è mobile"	37.35%	35.00%	72.35%	4th Place
Episode 25 (May 29)	2	Klarisse de Guzman	Patti LaBelle – "Over the Rainbow"	50.00%	40.00%	90.00%	Winner
Episode 25 (May 29)	3	Christian Bables	Lady Gaga – "Applause"	33.20%	30.00%	63.20%	5th Place
Episode 25 (May 29)	4	Geneva Cruz	Nicole Scherzinger of The Pussycat Dolls – "When I Grow Up"	26.88%	20.00%	46.88%	7th Place
Episode 26 (May 30)	5	CJ Navato	Bruno Mars – "That's What I Like"	34.39%	25.00%	59.39%	6th Place
Episode 26 (May 30)	6	Vivoree Esclito	Ariana Grande – "Focus"	33.40%	45.00%	78.40%	3rd Place
Episode 26 (May 30)	7	Lie Reposposa	Dulce – "Ako ang Nasawi, Ako ang Nagwagi"	30.43%	50.00%	80.43%	2nd Place

== Specials ==
Due to restrictions established by the Enhanced Community Quarantine that was in effect from March 29 to April 11 in the Greater Manila Area resulting in a suspension of tapings of newer episodes, no new performances were aired from April 4 to 11. Instead, performances from the previous weeks were re-aired.

=== April 4 ===
Due to Holy Week pre-empting regular programming from Thursday to Saturday, the Sunday episode was supposed to air duet performances. However, due to the Enhanced Community Quarantine being reimposed over the Greater Manila Area from March 29-April 11 that became the result of the surge of COVID-19 cases caused by the Alpha (B.1.1.7) and Beta (B.1.351) in the aforementioned areas, the plans for a duet week was cancelled, and a director's cut version of Week 1's episodes was aired instead for that night.

Episode hashtag

- #YourFacePH2021 (Sunday)

Performances

- iDolls as Hagibis – "Katawan"
- Vivoree Esclito as Sarah Geronimo – "Tala"
- Klarisse De Guzman as Christina Aguilera – "Dirrty"
- Jhong Hilario as apl.de.ap of The Black Eyed Peas – "Bebot"
- Christian Bables as Adam Levine – "Sugar"
- Lie Reposposa as Moira Dela Torre – "Titibo-Tibo"
- CJ Navato as Jose Mari Chan – "Beautiful Girl"
- Geneva Cruz as Jennifer Lopez – "On The Floor"

=== April 10 & 11 ===
Episode hashtag

- #YFSFSakalam (Saturday)
- #YFSFPinoyPower (Sunday)

Performances

April 10

- Jhong Hilario as Tina Turner – "Proud Mary" (Week 4)
- iDolls as Boyz II Men – "The Color of Love" (Week 6)
- Christian Bables as Cher – "Strong Enough" (Week 2)
- Vivoree Esclito as Rihanna – "Shut Up and Drive" (Week 6)

April 11

- CJ Navato as Rico J. Puno – "Macho Gwapito" (Week 3)
- Geneva Cruz as Pilita Corrales – "Kapantay ay Langit" (Week 2)
- Lie Reposposa as Sheryn Regis – "Kailan Kaya" (Week 5)
- Klarisse de Guzman as Jaya – "Hanggang Dito Na Lang" (Week 3)

== Production ==
=== Development ===
The season was confirmed in December 2020 during the Ikaw ang Liwanang at Ligaya: The ABS-CBN Christmas Special 2020. This season marked the first regular season in five years after two consecutive seasons of the children's edition. In 2021, the show revealed its first teaser along with the new title card and logo. The taping of the show's first three episodes started sometime in late January 2021.

=== Impact of the COVID-19 pandemic on the season ===
As the season was held during the COVID-19 pandemic in the Philippines, which caused the country to go into various forms of community quarantine, the show implemented several health and safety protocols in the studio to ensure the safety of the artists, crew and staff from the threat of COVID-19. The show also entailed a lock-in taping set-up to produce three weeks of episodes per taping cycle, being taped without any studio audience admitted inside the studio. Instead, a virtual audience via Zoom is admitted instead while using artificial crowd noise, while Darren Espanto and AC Bonifacio hosted the online companion show through remote work also via Zoom.

In late March 2021, a surge of COVID-19 cases in the Greater Manila Area caused by the Alpha and Beta variants of the said virus resulted in a reimposition of the enhanced community quarantine in the aforementioned areas from March 29 to April 11, 2021, which caused the show to temporarily suspended tapings of new episodes in compliance with the community quarantine guidelines during the said period, and Director's cut versions of several past episodes of the season were aired instead on April 4, 10 and 11.

The show's taping of new episodes resumed on April 14, 2021, while rehearsals for the third taping cycle started on April 12, 2021, following the downgrade to modified enhanced community quarantine.

After six weeks of being part of the show, Jhong Hilario, one of the contestants, chose to quit the show due to the pandemic. He mentioned that he made the decision for the wellbeing of his newborn baby, as babies are among those who are susceptible to the coronavirus. At the time of his withdrawal, he had 107 points, having won weeks 1 and 2.

On April 18, 2021, Geneva Cruz was also unable to perform on the third taping cycle, which spanned three weeks of airing (Week 7–9) due to her exposure to COVID-19 at the time of the third taping cycle. This occurred after her mother was confirmed to have contracted the virus and subsequently died afterwards. She returned to the competition on Week 10, with Toni Braxton being her icon to impersonate upon returning.

=== Hosts and judges ===
Sharon Cuneta and Gary Valenciano reprised their roles as members of the jury. Ogie Alcasid replaced Jed Madela, as he did during the two Kids seasons.

The host and judges of Your Face Sounds Familiar 3

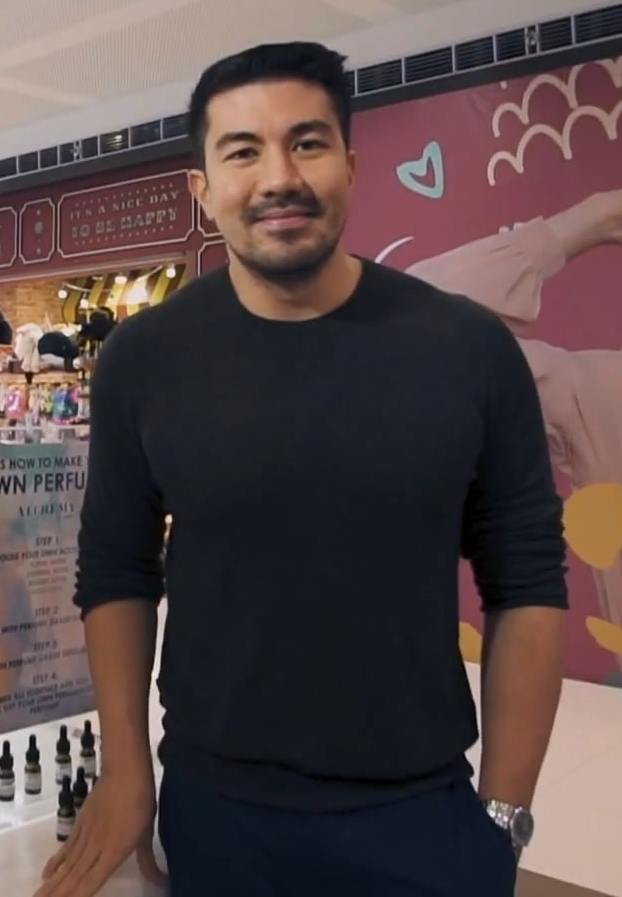
Luis Manzano

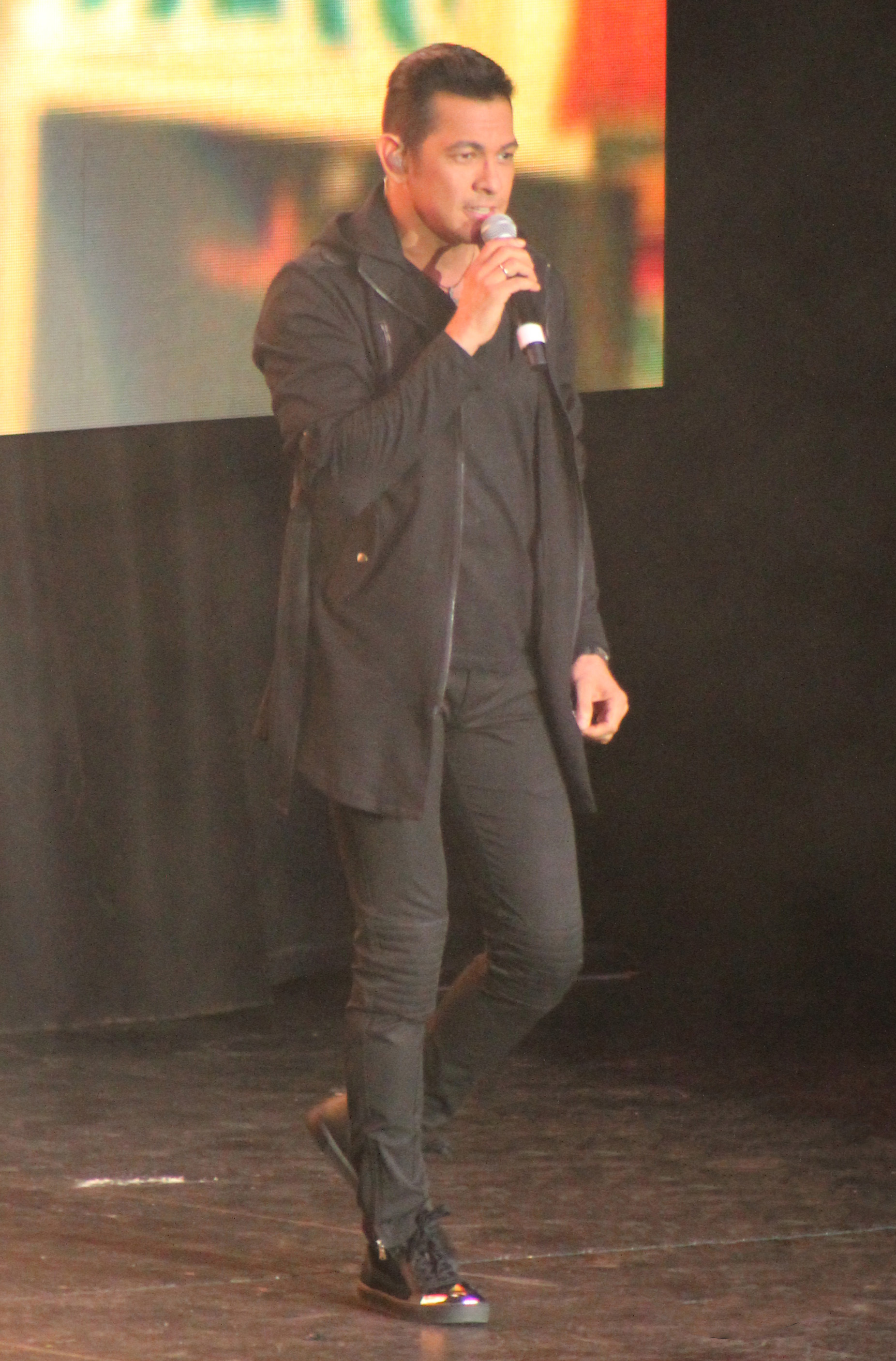
Gary Valenciano

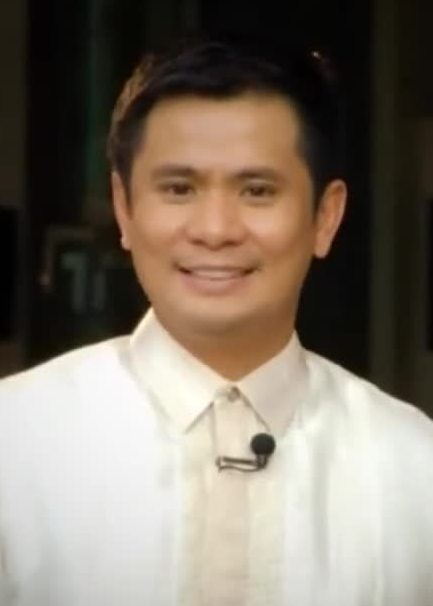
Ogie Alcasid

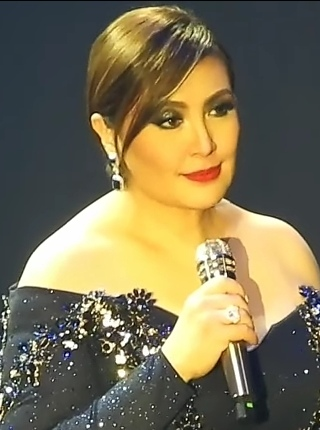
Sharon Cuneta

Luis Manzano served as the new host, replacing Billy Crawford due to his departure from the network in the aftermath of its shutdown, franchise denial and layoffs, which saw his transfer to blocktimer shows that are aired on TV5.

The show's online companion show, Your Face Sounds Familiar: KaFamiliar Online Live is hosted by Darren Espanto and Kids Season 1 contestant AC Bonifacio. It airs simultaneously with the main show, being streamed live on the official YouTube channel of the show and through Kapamilya Online Live.

Awra Briguela or Jeremy Glinoga occasionally served as substitute hosts whenever Bonifacio or Espanto are unable to host the online companion show.

Jeremy Glinoga co-hosted the online show along with Bonifacio and Espanto in The Grand Showdown on May 29, 2021.

=== Mentors ===
In January 2021, Cuneta confirmed that Jed Madela and Nyoy Volante will reprise their previous roles as mentors for vocals and choreography.

=== Guest judges ===
In certain weeks, guest judges substituted for members of the jury in their respective absences.

- Jed Madela (Cuneta's substitute judge for Week 7)
