= Hawak Mo ang Beat =

Single by OPM Music Studio
- Language: Tagalog
- Released: 2025
- Genre: Dance-pop, budots

"Hawak Mo ang Beat" (Tagalog: [ˌhaː.wɐk mo ʔɐŋ ˈbit]; transl. You Hold the Beat) is a song by OPM Music Studio, first released in 2025. The song gained massive popularity across social media platforms in the Philippines, inspiring numerous dance challenges and memes. Frenchman Sylvain Hernandez, who uses the stage name DJ Mogo, has claimed that he produced the song, whose version was released in 2026. The song also became the subject of widespread debate regarding the use of artificial intelligence in music production. Despite public speculation and industry commentary suggesting the track was AI-generated, DJ Mogo has firmly denied these claims.

== Background and release ==
The earliest known upload of the song appeared on Spotify in 2025 under the account name OPM Music Studio.

Sylvain Hernandez, a French citizen married to a Filipina, claimed he created the song with the help of his wife. Hernandez stated that the musical composition was inspired by traditional Visayan cha-cha music and the heavy drums of the Philippine budots style. He explained that his goal was to create a light, bouncy, and joyful vibe that brings people together to dance. As of March 2026, the track had surpassed 1 million streams on the platform. The identity of the vocalist remains unconfirmed, as Hernandez refused to reveal who sang the song, stating he wants to keep it a secret.

== Reception and virality ==
"Hawak Mo ang Beat" became a nationwide dance craze in the Philippines. The song was widely shared on platforms like TikTok, Facebook, and YouTube. Its upbeat tempo made it a popular choice for zumba classes, school energizers, and street dance challenges. Several Filipino celebrities posted videos of themselves dancing to the track, including Vice Ganda, Charo Santos, Toni Gonzaga, and the SexBomb Girls. The trend also spawned various memes and alternative versions online. For example, content creator Ian Kulan Kamangkang popularized a choreographic variation, while comedian Pokwang created a humorous version altering the lyrics to "Hawak mo ang bill" (lit. 'You're holding the bill') while holding an electricity bill.

== Artificial intelligence controversy ==
Following the song's sudden popularity, internet users and music industry observers began speculating that "Hawak Mo ang Beat" was entirely generated by artificial intelligence. Critics pointed to the song's cover art, which featured gibberish text and a hyper-saturated, artificial-looking crowd, as evidence of AI usage. Some local media reports claimed the track was produced using an AI-generated voice designed to sound like a real human. Music producer Gian Vergel publicly stated that the song is "obviously AI", noting that while AI allows for faster music creation, it could negatively impact human composers. The viral success of the song sparked broader discussions within the Philippine music industry about the ethical implications of AI. SB19 member Pablo and the Filipino Society of Composers, Authors and Publishers Inc. (FILSCAP) used the issue to call for stricter regulations and responsible use of generative AI tools to protect artists' identities and creative works. Singer Janine Teñoso also expressed concern over the proliferation of AI music in relation to the song. Songwriter Lolito Go also weighed in and criticized DJ Mogo for insisting on his claims about the song’s authorship instead of being transparent about its AI-assisted production.

In response to the allegations, DJ Mogo firmly denied using AI to generate any part of the song. He insisted that the song was made authentically by himself using high-standard electronic software to create the beat. He asked the public to focus on enjoying the music and the energy of the song rather than the rumors.
