= Patawad =

Studio album by Moira Dela Torre
- Released: March 27, 2020
- Studio: Star Music (Quezon City, Metro Manila)
- Genre: Pop, Soul, OPM
- Length: 56:00
- Label: Star Music

Moira Dela Torre chronology
Knots (2018)	Patawad (2020)	Halfway Point (Reimagined) (2021)

Singles from Patawad
- 1. "Mabagal (with Daniel Padilla)"; 2. "Patawad, Paalam (with I Belong to the Zoo)" Released: June 13, 2019; 3. "Paalam (with Ben&Ben)" Released: September 13, 2019; 4. "Unbreakable (with Regine Velasquez-Alcasid)"; 5. "Patawad" Released: February 6, 2020; 6. "Hanggang Sa Huli (from "24/7")"; 7. "Paubaya" Released: February 14, 2021

Patawad (lit. 'Sorry') is the second studio album by Filipina singer Moira Dela Torre. It was released in 2020 by Star Music. The album consists of thirteen tracks. This album features the trilogy "Patawad, Paalam" with I Belong To The Zoo, "Paalam" with Ben&Ben, and the titular song "Patawad". The album was certified platinum the same year.

== Background ==
=== Singles ===
The sixth single "Hanggang Sa Huli" was released for the Filipino action drama television series 24/7, starring Julia Montes. Dela Torre dedicated this song to the employees of ABS-CBN in the midst of the network's legislative franchise controversy.

=== Patawad, Paalam trilogy ===
The second single "Patawad, Paalam" was released on June 13, 2019. Its music video was released on July 1, 2019. The music video started a love story, portrayed by JM de Guzman and Anna Luna, on growing old with a lingering regret of having ended their relationship.

The third single of the album "Paalam" was released on September 13, 2019, marking Dela Torre's first collaboration with Filipino folk-pop band Ben&Ben. The official music video was released on March 26, 2020 making up the second chapter on leaving a relationship without explanations.

The fifth single and titular song "Patawad" was released on February 6, 2020, with a music video, released the same day as "Paalam", on March 26, 2020. The music video, the final part to close the trilogy, makes up the final chapter on gaining freedom in forgiveness.

Dela Torre and Hernandez came up with the idea of the trilogy within the album. The trilogy was inspired by Moira's grandparents.

The seventh single "Paubaya" was released as the final single of the album on Valentine's Day of 2021. A music video starring Joshua Garcia and Julia Barretto was also released on the same day, on realizing that some people aren't meant to be together.

== Release ==
Patawad was released on March 27, 2020. Dela Torre and her team considered postponing the album's release due to the COVID-19 pandemic, but decided to push through to give people comfort and hope during that time.

== Track listing ==
8 songs were written by Dela Torre and husband Jason Hernandez with contributions from Erik Santos, Argee Guerrero of I Belong To The Zoo and Paolo Benjamin Guico of Ben&Ben.

Patawad
No.	Title	Writer(s)	Length
1.	"Handa, Awit"	Vee	2:34
2.	"Kita Na Kita"	Hernandez, Dela Torre	3:42
3.	"Ang Iwasan"	Hernandez, Dela Torre	4:40
4.	"Pahinga"	Go, Dela Torre	3:53
5.	"Ikaw Pa Rin" (featuring Erik Santos)	Hernandez, Santos, Dela Torre	4:17
6.	"Sabi Ng Lola"	Dela Torre, Hernandez	4:06
7.	"E.D.S.A. - Emosyong Dinaan Sa Awit"	Hernandez, Dela Torre	5:30
8.	"Patawad, Paalam" (featuring I Belong To the Zoo)	Guerrero, Hernandez, Dela Torre	5:23
9.	"Paalam" (featuring Ben&Ben)	Hernandez, Dela Torre, P. Guico	4:51
10.	"Patawad"	Dela Torre, Hernandez	4:37
11.	"Hanggang Sa Huli" (from 24/7)	Manalo, Campañer	4:19
12.	"Unbreakable" (featuring Regine Velasquez-Alcasid)	Manalo, Campañer	4:32
13.	"Mabagal" (with Daniel Padilla)	Tañedo	3:47
14.	"Paubaya"		4:42
Total length:			1:00:42

== Certification ==
Region	Certification	Certified units/sales
Philippines (PARI)	Platinum	15,000^{*}
^{*} Sales figures based on certification alone.

== See also ==
- Malaya (Moira Dela Torre album)
- Moira Dela Torre discography
