= Ian Mark Kamangkang =

Filipino content creator

- Born: Ian Mark Kamangkang; 30 January 1993 (age 33); South Cotabato, Philippines
- Occupations: Vlogger; comedian
- Years active: 2026–present

Ian Mark Kulan Kamangkang, popularly known as the "Pitik Queen", is a Filipino social media personality and content creator known for his viral dance style called "pitik with soft moves." He gained widespread attention in 2026 for his performances to the song "Hawak Mo ang Beat", which became a viral dance trend across social media platforms.

== Early life and background ==
Kamangkang is a native of Lake Sebu, South Cotabato, and belongs to the T'boli ethnic group. Aside from being known as the "Pitik Queen," he has also been dubbed by netizens as the "Secretary of DPWH," a humorous title referring to his signature high-waisted fashion style.

Before gaining online popularity, he worked as a school secretary and previously served as a college instructor and junior high school teacher, where he taught travel education and the T'boli culture. He also supported his siblings in finishing their education. He has experienced several personal challenges, including failing the Licensure Examination for Teachers, being involved in a road accident, and facing family hardships such as flooding.

Kamangkang experienced bullying during his childhood due to his gender expression, particularly during his elementary school years. In an interview with Toni Gonzaga on Toni Talks, he recalled being subjected to verbal harassment from peers, although he chose not to retaliate despite feeling hurt. He has openly expressed his identity and noted that his family, including his father, was supportive and accepting. He also shared that several members of his family identify similarly.

== Career ==
=== Rise to prominence ===
Kamangkang rose to prominence in 2026 after his dance videos featuring the song "Hawak Mo ang Beat" went viral online. His signature dance style, described as "pitik with soft moves," is characterized by natural, rhythm-based movements rather than choreographed routines.

His social media presence has continued to expand across multiple platforms. As of 2026, he has amassed over 300,000 followers and more than 11 million likes on TikTok, while his Instagram account has gained over 12,000 followers within a short period.

=== Collaborations and public appearances ===
Following his viral success, Kamangkang engaged in collaborations with various celebrities and content creators. These include personalities such as Betong Sumaya, Macoy Dubs, Zeus Collins, Nikko Natividad, and Sanya Lopez. He also performed alongside drag performer Khianna in a viral performance in Quezon City.

In March 2026, Kamangkang appeared as a surprise guest at the wedding of singer Dionela and Meizy Mendoza, where he performed his signature dance moves during the reception.

== Public image and advocacy ==
Aside from his online presence, Kamangkang is involved in community outreach activities, organizing charity missions in remote areas. He has shared that some of these efforts involve long journeys across mountainous terrain and rivers to reach underserved communities.

In May 2026, Kamangkang joined the Good Zone 90-Day Feeding Program as its Brand Champion. The project aimed to provide nutritious meals to Helping Land, Tondo, where 200 malnourished children are, for three months. Kamangkang participated in the food distribution and used their platform to support the campaign against hunger.

== Filmography ==
=== Television appearances ===
Year	Title	Role	References
2026	Eat Bulaga!	Himself (guest)	
2026	Kapuso Mo, Jessica Soho	Himself (guest)	
2026	Vibe	Himself (guest)	
2026	It's Showtime	Himself (guest)	
