= List of 2 Good 2 Be True episodes =

2 Good 2 Be True is a Philippine drama romantic comedy television series broadcast by Kapamilya Channel. It aired on the network's Primetime Bida evening block, A2Z Primetime, TV5's TodoMax Primetime Singko, and worldwide via The Filipino Channel from May 16 to November 11, 2022, replacing Viral Scandal.

== Series overview ==
Season	Episodes	Originally released	
Season	Episodes	First released	Last released
1	130	May 16, 2022	November 11, 2022

== Episodes ==
No.	Title	TV title	Original release date (Note: Netflix streams advance episodes three days before its television broadcast, while iWantTFC streams two episodes in advance before its television broadcast.)	AGB Nielsen Ratings (NUTAM People)
1	"Odd Encounter"	"2 Good at First Sight"	May 16, 2022	8.0%
While carrying out a scam at a posh hotel, Eloy overhears — and misinterprets — an interaction between hardworking nurse Ali and her employer.
2	"Allergic Reaction"	"2 Good 2 Forget"	May 17, 2022	7.3%
Ali reports what she saw to the police. Eloy visits his father in prison and Uncle Ben in the hospital — and runs into a familiar face.
3	"Another Trickster"	"2 Good 2 Trick"	May 18, 2022	6.9%
Ali's mom Margie falls victim to an online scam. Eloy comes up with a plan to gain Ali's trust and prevent her from ratting him out.
4	"Finding Ali"	"2 Good 2 Suspect"	May 19, 2022	7.0%
As Ali, Margie and Pat try to recoup the money they lost, Eloy shows up with an envelope of cash. Real estate magnate Hugo Agcaoili visits the hospital.
5	"A New Connection"	"2 Good 2 Miss"	May 20, 2022	6.8%
As Hugo comes to terms with his Alzheimer's, he agrees to hire help — with a specific nurse in mind. The court reaches a verdict on Fred's appeal.
6	"A Secret Task"	"2 Good Secrets"	May 23, 2022	7.5%
While investigating his father’s case, Eloy catches Ali in Hugo's mansion, unaware that she's his new nurse. Meanwhile, Tara finds herself in hot water.
7	"A Tough Case"	"2 Good Demands"	May 24, 2022	7.1%
Eloy manages to avoid charges after Tara withdraws the robbery case. Hugo proves to be a stubborn patient, but Ali does her best to win him over.
8	"Testing the Waters"	"2 Good Haunted"	May 25, 2022	7.2%
Eloy's distrust for Hugo grows when Fred tenses up at the mention of his name. Ali tries to lay down new rules to delay Hugo's disease progression.
9	"Stressful Job"	"2 Good Connections"	May 26, 2022	6.2%
Ali tries out different approaches to reduce her stubborn patient's stress. Eloy digs deep into Hugo's shady business practices.
10	"The Auto Mechanic"	"2 Good Engine Whisperer"	May 27, 2022	6.1%
Ali's effort to have Hugo's beloved vintage car fixed brings her to another encounter with Eloy, who takes the chance to get closer to the tycoon.
11	"Loaded Warning"	"2 Good Life Saver"	May 30, 2022	6.9%
Ali nearly loses her job when Eloy shows up at the mansion to try and fix Hugo's vintage car. Fred pleads with Heart to keep his son away from Hugo.
12	"Unintentional Tie-up"	"2 Good 2-in-1"	May 31, 2022	6.7%
Ali suspects that Eloy is up to something that could put her job in jeopardy. Despite Heart's worries, Eloy resolves to get more information about Hugo.
13	"Watchful Eye"	"2 Good Surveillance"	June 1, 2022	7.4%
Ali's efforts to prepare a healthy meal for Hugo go down the drain. Eloy finds a new lead that could help his father's case.
14	"Real Concern"	"2 Good 2 Break"	June 2, 2022	N/A
Ali and Eloy take different approaches in responding to their boss's bad temper. Jill grows suspicious of Ali after seeing her expensive-looking ring.
15	"Wrong Impression"	"2 Good 2 Fake"	June 3, 2022	N/A
Eloy doubts his hunches after catching a glimpse of Ali at an unlikely place. Jill badmouths Ali to Helena. Margie and Pat have a dinner guest.
16	"Sugar Daddy"	"2 Good 2 Gossip"	June 6, 2022	N/A
While malicious rumors about Ali and Hugo circulate among the household staff, Eloy begins to piece together the truth about the real estate magnate.
17	"Investigation Continues"	"2 Good Case"	June 7, 2022	N/A
While Captain Rosales revisits Ali's testimony about the hotel heist, Eloy finds renewed vigor in his own investigation.
18	"The Stubborn Nurse"	"2 Good 2 Faint"	June 8, 2022	N/A
Ali suffers the consequences of overworking herself day and night. Margie urges her daughter to make a decision. Eloy gets on Hugo's good side.
19	"To Resign or Not"	"2 Good 2 Propose"	June 9, 2022	N/A
Margie puts Ali on strict bedrest as more gossip about her spreads through the mansion. Eloy learns that Tox is having problems.
20	"Strange Gladness"	"2 Good 2 Investigate"	June 10, 2022	N/A
Fred worries for his son after Heart confirms her suspicion that the police are on Eloy's trail. Hugo catches the staff gossiping about his love life.
21	"Temporary Driver"	"2 Good Housemates"	June 13, 2022	N/A
Hugo faces a health setback. Badong prepares to take a week off, prompting Ali and Eloy to ask if they can stay at the house while he's away.
22	"Locked Out"	"2 Good Locked Out"	June 14, 2022	N/A
Red, Daddy Ays and Tox hack into the police station's computer system. Ali and Eloy settle into life at the mansion — with a few hiccups.
23	"Hugo's Longing"	"2 Good Reminisce"	June 15, 2022	N/A
Forced to spend the night in the garage, Ali and Eloy each take a car to sleep in - and inadvertently overhear a heartfelt confession.
24	"Childhood Memory"	"2 Good Revelations"	June 16, 2022	N/A
When Ali gets emotional, Eloy shares a story from childhood that is surprisingly familiar to her. Hugo experiences delirium while with Jill.
25	"Sweet Little Girl"	"2 Good Encounter"	June 17, 2022	N/A
Eloy faces threats from Hugo. Ali keeps mum about her past encounter with Eloy, but a conversation with her boss soon reveals the truth.
26	"A Bottle of Whiskey"	"2 Good 2 Cheers"	June 20, 2022	N/A
Hugo makes a list of people he can trust and sneaks in a drink with Eloy — prompting Ali to search the whole mansion for him.
27	"Annoying but Cute"	"2 Good Gigil"	June 21, 2022	N/A
Amid growing feelings for Ali, Eloy continues his surveillance of Hugo. Margie grudgingly makes up with Captain Rosales.
28	"Interesting Dynamics"	"2 Good Small World"	June 22, 2022	N/A
Jill starts to recognize the changes in Hugo. Ben unintentionally spills information that could jeopardize Eloy. Heart visits the mansion.
29	"A Request for Ali"	"2 Good 2 Convince"	June 23, 2022	N/A
Eloy's friends are alarmed when they learn how much Ben told Captain Rosales. Hugo puts work to the side for the first time to enjoy his leave.
30	"Dance Partner"	"2 Good Dance Partner"	June 24, 2022	N/A
As a rumor about Hugo's health spreads around the company, Ali pulls out all the stops to persuade him to attend an important event.
31	"Into the Rhythm"	"2 Good Practice"	June 27, 2022	N/A
Sparks fly as Ali and Eloy get lost in the rhythm of their dance. Hugo learns of the rumor about him and recalls how he rose to success.
32	"One Grand Event"	"2 Good Grand Event"	June 28, 2022	N/A
Hugo surprises everyone with his presence at Horizon Grand's stockholders' night. Eloy abandons his mission in order to help Ali out of a bind.
33	"A Different Name"	"2 Good 2 Remember"	June 29, 2022	N/A
Thanks to Ali and Eloy, Hugo makes it through the stockholders' night. The next day, his mood turns sour at the mention of a mysterious woman's name.
34	"Trust Issues"	"2 Good Trust Issues"	June 30, 2022	N/A
Ali grows curious about Hanna. While Fred lands in trouble, Eloy finds himself running out of time to gain Hugo's trust.
35	"Rice Cake Problem"	"2 Good Not 2 Hug"	July 1, 2022	N/A
Eloy eavesdrops on a conversation about the future of Horizon Grand. Ali finds herself on thin ice when Chubs fails to prepare Hugo's favorite dessert.
36	"Family Matters"	"2 Good Family Matters"	July 4, 2022	N/A
Helena's visit to the mansion comes to an abrupt end. After a call with Captain Rosales, Ali finally learns of Eloy's motives for the hotel robbery.
37	"Unsettling Suspicion"	"2 Good As Friend"	July 5, 2022	N/A
Captain Rosales gets mistaken for Pat's father. Helena's suspicion of Eloy grows. Uninvited guests follow Hugo to the golf course.
38	"Wary Cheerleader"	"2 Good Nice Shot"	July 6, 2022	N/A
Ali sets aside her doubts and cheers for Eloy when he teams up with Hugo for a golf match. Tox is forced to reveal her crush's identity.
39	"Deceptive Trick"	"2 Good Crush"	July 7, 2022	N/A
A key witness comes forward to testify in the hotel robbery case. Eloy feels conflicted about stealing the key to Hugo's desk drawer.
40	"A Moment of Urgency"	"2 Good 2 Hide	July 8, 2022	N/A
Helena arrives at the mansion as Hugo is experiencing another episode. In the confusion, Eloy finds a chance to look for evidence against his boss.
41	"Finding Comfort"	"2 Good Frustrations"	July 11, 2022	N/A
Ali feels guilty after not being totally honest with Hugo about his last episode — prompting a pep talk from Eloy. Red tries to shake off Tox's "crush."
42	"The Matchmaker"	"2 Good Memories"	July 12, 2022	N/A
Ali tries to rekindle happy memories for Hugo by bringing him to a place from his past. Then, the old man plays cupid and tries to set her up with Eloy.
43	"A Date to Remember"	"2 Good Picnic"	July 13, 2022	N/A
During their outing with Hugo, Ali and Eloy have a meaningful chat and discover more about each other's dreams.
44	"Tension in the Air"	"2 Good 2 Say Goodbye"	July 14, 2022	N/A
As Ali and Eloy draw closer to each other, authorities arrive with an arrest warrant for Eloy — placing his loved ones in a bind.
45	"Hidden Feelings"	"2 Good 2 Protect"	July 15, 2022	N/A
Red takes the fall for the hotel room robbery as Eloy remains on the run. Ali feels conflicted about her feelings for Eloy and tries to contact him.
46	"A Shocking Discovery"	"2 Good 2 Surrender"	July 18, 2022	N/A
Ali's mother finds out more about her daughter's feelings for Eloy. Meanwhile, Grandma Heart visits Eloy's father in prison.
47	"Guilty Heart"	"2 Good 2 The Rescue"	July 19, 2022	N/A
A conversation with Grandma Heart leads Ali to recall unfortunate incidents involving Eloy's family in the past. Eloy receives some visitors in jail.
48	"Surprising Decision"	"2 Good 2 Defend"	July 20, 2022	N/A
Eloy comes to a decision that might jeopardize his chances of becoming a lawyer. Meanwhile, Ali decides to visit Eloy at the police station.
49	"Heavy Hearts"	"2 Good 2 Say Sorry"	July 21, 2022	N/A
During her visit, Ali can't bear the thought of Eloy serving time in jail. Fred decides to plan his escape from prison with the help of an inmate.
50	"Support Group"	"2 Good Support Group"	July 22, 2022	N/A
Jill questions Hugo's drastic change in behavior, putting Ali in an awkward position. Later, Grandma Heart visits Eloy and Red in jail.
51	"A New Case"	"2 Good 2 Bail"	July 25, 2022	N/A
As Eloy faces new charges, Captain Rosales grows suspicious of the plaintiff's motives. Eloy's loved ones finds ways to raise money for his bail.
52	"A Solid Team"	"2 Good Solid Team"	July 26, 2022	N/A
Suspecting that a mole is within his midst, Hugo fires one of his employees. Red decided to investigate Attorney Evangelista against Eloy's wishes.
53	"Radio Romance"	"2 Good 2 Help"	July 27, 2022	N/A
Margie learns of her involvement in the incident that changed the fate of the entire Borja family. Ali finds a way to send a message to Eloy.
54	"Joining Forces"	"2 Good Para Kay Eloy"	July 28, 2022	N/A
Margie pays a visit to Fred in prison. Soon, the Fajardos join forces with Eloy's friends and family to earn money for his bail.
55	"The Real Villain"	"2 Good Live Selling"	July 29, 2022	N/A
Hugo explains his reasons for firing Jill to Ali. The terminated employee, meanwhile, learns a big secret and receives a tempting offer.
56	"The Sad Truth"	"2 Good 2 Blame"	August 1, 2022	N/A
Jill receives a call from Ali as she considers Helena and Ramon's proposition. Eloy and his cellmates buzz with excitement over Ali's upcoming visit.
57	"Turn of Events"	"2 Good News"	August 2, 2022	N/A
Eloy's expectations get quashed after Ali's visit. Jill earns a second chance. Helena and Ramon think of a new plan after Eloy gets released on bail.
58	"Eloy is Back"	"2 Good 2gether Again"	August 3, 2022	N/A
Eloy and Red have off-the-record meetings with an unlikely new ally. Hugo, Jimmy and Ramon set out on a road trip, leaving Ali worried sick.
59	"Hugo's Regret"	"2 Good Confrontation"	August 4, 2022	N/A
Hugo has a heated talk with Eloy and grieves after a devastating realization about Hanna. While Ali comforts him, Jill uses the opportunity to snoop.
60	"Honest Intention"	"2 Good Intentions"	August 5, 2022	N/A
Eloy comes clean to Ali about why he started working for Hugo, but assures her that he genuinely cares for them. Fred's lawyer gets an unlikely visitor.
61	"A Critical Situation"	"2 Good Warning"	August 8, 2022	N/A
Fred warns Eloy to sever ties with Hugo. Ali and the household staff are on pins and needles when Hugo falls into critical condition before a meeting.
62	"Loyalty Check"	"2 Good Rumors"	August 9, 2022	N/A
Ali and Eloy find comfort in each other at the hospital. Helena feigns concern to dig for more information and incite leadership discussions.
63	"Another Bad News"	"2 Good Marriage Problems"	August 10, 2022	N/A
Eloy feels a pang of guilt upon learning of Ays' marital problems. Gemma and Chubs start to see Ali in a different light. Badong delivers bad news.
64	"That Thing Called Love"	"2 Good 2 Fix"	August 11, 2022	N/A
Eloy has a realization while helping Ays make up with Arianne. Pat catches Cap and Margie in a compromising position. Hugo's stubbornness wins out.
65	"That Thing Called Love"	"2 Good Game Plant"	August 12, 2022	N/A
Hugo sneaks out of the hospital with Jimmy and Ramon, leaving Ali and Eloy scrambling. Helena takes advantage of her brother's absence.
66	"Partners Again"	"2 Good 2 Escape"	August 15, 2022	N/A
Ali and Eloy set out to look for Hugo. Jill gets her hands on crucial information, unaware that the household staff are keeping a close eye on her.
67	"Passenger Seat"	"2 Good 2 Be True"	August 16, 2022	5.8%
The runaways get into trouble on the road while Ali and Eloy track them down. Captain Rosales's investigation leads to Eloy's attorney.
68	"Middle of Nowhere"	"2 Good 2 Be Lost"	August 17, 2022	6.0%
Hugo stays one step ahead of Ali and Eloy. Jill discloses Hugo's condition to Helena, believing that the secret is in safe hands.
69	"Rumor Has It"	"2 Good Finding Lolo Sir"	August 18, 2022	6.0%
As rumors of Hugo's condition spread around the company, Ali and Eloy continue their search for the runaways. Hugo reminisces about Hanna.
70	"Sorting Things Out"	"2 Good True Feelings"	August 19, 2022	5.6%
Tox finally comes clean to Red about her feelings, while Ali and Eloy discuss their relationship. Captain Rosales obtains new information about Hanna.
71	"The Shocking Truth"	"2 Good Confession"	August 22, 2022	5.8%
Ali asks Eloy to wait until they solve the problems at hand before she answers his confession. Eloy inches closer to the truth after locating Hugo.
72	"Emotional Turmoil"	"2 Good Uncertainty"	August 23, 2022	5.7%
Learning the truth about Hanna leaves Eloy with more questions. Ali prioritizes getting medical attention for Hugo. Margie celebrates her graduation.
73	"Questions and Betrayal"	"2 Good Reunion"	August 24, 2022	5.5%
Ali refuses to leave Hugo's side as he receives medical attention. While struggling to process everything, Eloy gets the biggest surprise of his life.
74	"A Father's Return"	"2 Good 2 Be Free"	August 25, 2022	5.2%
Helena comes up with a plan to ensure her accession to power in the company, but an unforeseen move from Hugo catches her and Ali by surprise.
75	"One Trusted Person"	"2 Good 2 Trust"	August 26, 2022	N/A
While Eloy spends time with Fred, Ali pays him a visit. Jimmy addresses the rumor about Hugo's health condition in the company.
76	"Good Intention"	"2 Good True Intentions"	August 29, 2022	N/A
Red helps Tox get out of a sticky situation. Ali and Eloy's families grow excited about their blossoming romance. Hugo recalls a fond memory of Eloy.
77	"Great Responsibility"	"2 Good Legal Guardian"	August 30, 2022	N/A
Helena sets her sights on another target. Eloy realizes being Hugo's grandson comes with more responsibilities than just being his legal guardian.
78	"Secrecy and Dishonesty"	"2 Good Return of Lolo Sir"	August 31, 2022	N/A
Ali briefs the mansion staff ahead of Hugo's return. Eloy feels guilty for not being honest with Fred, unaware that his father also has a secret.
79	"Another Devious Ploy"	"The Secret is Out"	September 1, 2022	N/A
As Hugo's health improves, Helena brews another devious plot. Eloy lets Heart and his friends in on a secret about Hanna.
80	"News Leak"	"2 Good 2 Expose"	September 2, 2022	N/A
Margie feels giddy after Captain Rosales's unexpected gesture. Ali scrambles to keep Hugo from learning that his condition is making headlines.
81	"The Heir's Birthright"	"2 Good Tough Request"	September 5, 2022	N/A
Hugo learns of Eloy's guardianship. Helena takes advantage of Fred's resentment. Ali, the household staff and an unexpected guest try to cheer Hugo up.
82	"One Sweet Night"	"2 Good Sweet Night"	September 6, 2022	N/A
Ali heads home after learning of Margie's situation. Hugo opens up to his grandson about Hanna. Fred makes a decision that complicates things for Eloy.
83	"A Hasty Move"	"2 Good Family First"	September 7, 2022	N/A
Ali spends some quality time with her family and opens up about Eloy's confession of love. Eloy gets wind of Fred's hasty plans.
84	"Caught in the Middle"	"2 Good Tough Choice"	September 8, 2022	N/A
Helena rejoices as her plan comes to fruition. Ali receives an emotional plea from Heart. Eloy is forced to make a tough choice.
85	"Leaving So Soon"	"2 Good Hard Decision"	September 9, 2022	N/A
Ali prepares an oblivious Hugo for his last dinner with Eloy. Heart and Eloy's friends struggle to accept the Borjas' decision.
86	"Farewell Blues"	"2 Good Farewell"	September 12, 2022	N/A
Hugo attempts to do some matchmaking. Meanwhile, All and Eloy plan how to break the news of the Borja's looming departure.
87	"To Be Continued"	"2 Good 2 be Continued"	September 13, 2022	N/A
Red attempts to stop Fred from leaving, while Ali asks Eloy if moving away is the only option. Captain Rosales reaches out to Margie.
88	"Investigation Reset"	"2 Good 2 Reset"	September 14, 2022	N/A
Eloy enlists the help of his friends as he sorts through all the facts and pieces of evidence in a bid to clear Hugo's name.
89	"Looming Threat"	"2 Good Waiting Game"	September 15, 2022	N/A
To stop Eloy from leaving, Ali rushes to the trial court where he awaits his sentence. Captain Rosales discovers a potential threat.
90	"No Letting Go"	"2 Good 2 Let Go"	September 16, 2022	N/A
While Hugo waits for good news with bated breath, Ali and Eloy persuade Fred to give the tycoon a chance to prove himself. Will love reign supreme?
91	"Officially Together"	"Officially 2gether"	September 19, 2022	N/A
Ali and Eloy are together.
92	"The Big Picture"	"2 Good Regrets"	September 20, 2022	N/A
It's time to find out the truth about Hugo's betrayal. This is why Fred lash out at him after what happened before. Helena shares the past.
93	"Two Fathers"	"2 Good Double Date"	September 21, 2022	N/A
94	"Decisions to Make"	"2 Good 2 Be Conflicted"	September 22, 2022	N/A
95	"Chairman of the Board"	"2 Good Chairman"	September 23, 2022	N/A
96	"Life-changing Decision"	"2 Good Successor"	September 26, 2022	4.6%
Ramon learns of the police investigation against him, while Helena faces a stumbling block when a rival arrives and takes away her much-awaited victory.
97	"Valid Concern"	"2 Good Alaming New"	September 27, 2022	N/A
Helena's fears slowly creep up on her. Ali receives an unexpected reaction from Eloy, sparking friction between the couple.
98	"Before the Day Ends"	"2 Good Big Boss"	September 28, 2022	N/A
Helena resolves to acquire the evidence in Ali's possession. Amid the pressure he's facing, Eloy resolves to patch things up with Ali.
99	"T.R.O.T."	"2 Good Motherly Advice"	September 29, 2022	N/A
Thanks to words of wisdom from Margie, Ali and Eloy end their quarrel. Red receives unsolicited advice from Ays. Attorney San Pedro goes on a date.
100	"Boyfriend Duties"	"2 Good Boyfriend Duties"	September 30, 2022	N/A
Eloy learns the truth about Fred's parole upon disclosing what he discovered about Helena. Captain Rosales warns Ali of impending danger.
101	"The Dashing Successor"	"2 Good Unexpected Offer"	October 3, 2022	N/A
Eloy, Ali and the three grandpas think of a plan to confirm their suspicions. Fred fumes over the possibility of him falling prey to Helena's schemes.
102	"Ghost of the Past"	"2 Good 2 Face"	October 4, 2022	N/A
Fred confronts Helena. All's painful past catches up with her when she comes face-to-face with an unexpected person at the precinct.
103	"Painful Love"	"2 Good Painful Love"	October 5, 2022	N/A
A deluge of negative emotions sweeps Margie upon learning who saved Pat. Red thinks of ways to make his last date with Tox memorable.
104	"Grandpa's Approval"	"2 Good 2 Deal"	October 6, 2022	N/A
Ays and Red follow a new lead to clear Hugo's name. Eloy tries to get his grandfather's approval for his first presentation at Horizon Grand.
105	"A Radical Proposal"	"2 Good Familiar Face"	October 7, 2022	N/A
Eloy makes a radical proposal during his first presentation as the new chairman. Margie and Pat attend self-defense training with Captain Rosales.
106	"Unjust Consequences"	"2 Good Medical Emergency"	October 10, 2022	N/A
Ali fears losing her nursing license when Eric resolves to take her to court. Helena gets her hopes up at the thought of finally being rid of Ali.
107	"Kindness Pays Off"	"2 Good Unwelcome Visitor"	October 11, 2022	N/A
In an attempt to atone, Diego saves Ali by explaining the truth and sharing his evidence against Helena. Margie confronts Jay about his intentions.
108	"Fancy Date"	"2 Good First Date"	October 12, 2022	N/A
Eloy takes Ali on a fancy date. Meanwhile, Margie feels conflicted about Jay's plea. Tox makes a request to Red about their fake relationship.
109	"Protective Boss"	"2 Good Bodyguard"	October 13, 2022	N/A
Following the incident at the hotel, Hugo assigns a bodyguard to Ali. Jill worries about Helena. Ali and her family get an unwanted visitor.
110	"A Shoulder to Cry On"	"2 Good 2 Stay"	October 14, 2022	N/A
Ali finds comfort in Eloy after an emotional confrontation. Hugo rushes to Helena's side when an alleged vengeful act leaves his sister injured.
111	"A Father's Advice"	"2 Good 2 Appreciate"	October 17, 2022	N/A
Helena succeeds in gaining sympathy from Hugo and dismissing everyone's suspicions about her. Ali contemplates giving her father a second chance.
112	"Bitter Memory"	"2 Good Bitter Memory"	October 18, 2022	N/A
The investigation faces a roadblock as Captain Rosales gets suspended. Hugo relives a bitter memory between him and his sister.
113	"Giving a Chance"	"2 Good Chances"	October 19, 2022	N/A
Captain Rosales finds information about Joey. Red does some research to help Eloy with his important meeting with a potential business partner.
114	"Language Barrier"	"2 Good Business Proposal"	October 20, 2022	N/A
Eloy's important meeting gets off to a rocky start when a language barrier and his criminal record cause problems. Ali decides to talk to her father.
115	"Ulterior Motive"	"2 Good True Motive"	October 21, 2022	N/A
Ali finally lends an ear to Joey, who turns out to have an ulterior motive for reaching out to her. Eloy receives disconcerting advice from Mr. Watanabe.
116	"A Step Closer"	"2 Good Real Score"	October 24, 2022	N/A
Ali receives news about her medical school application. Helena presses on with her plan. Tox comes clean to Ben about her fake relationship with Red.
117	"Provocation"	"2 Good Wrongdoings"	October 25, 2022	N/A
Helena makes a sudden visit to Hugo, alarming Eloy and the whole family. Fred musters up the courage to face Hugo at the mansion to ensure Ali's safety.
118	"Sweet Gesture"	"2 Good Sweet Gesture"	October 26, 2022	N/A
Captain Rosales notices something amiss while reviewing the CCTV footage of Helena's attack. Tox demands answers about Red's absence.
119	"Opposing Views"	"2 Good Opposing Views"	October 27, 2022	N/A
Ali refuses Eloy's offer to help her pay for her studies. Jimmy suggests a plan after sensing that some of the board members are plotting against Eloy.
120	"Creating Memories"	"2 Good True Colors"	October 28, 2022	N/A
Eloy's family beams with pride as he delivers his compensation plans. Right after the press conference, Helena openly declares war against Hugo.
121	"Heart's Memory"	"2 Good Heartful Memory"	October 31, 2022	N/A
Hugo rushes to confront Helena for sabotaging Eloy's plans, only to learn about a past meeting. Captain Rosales and his team finally catch Ramon.
122	"Aha Moment"	"2 Good Vengeance"	November 1, 2022	N/A
An enraged Fred charges into the precinct. Ali cancels her medical interview, upsetting Eloy. The truth behind Helena's motives starts coming to light.
123	"True Pairs"	"2 Good Tension"	November 2, 2022	N/A
Eloy comes up with a smart move to counter Helena. Tox admits her true feelings. Meanwhile, Jill gets her heart broken after a discovery.
124	"Dead End"	"2 Good Fake Act"	November 3, 2022	N/A
Helena reveals a trump card. Captain Rosales' investigation hits a dead end. Eloy and Joseph save Jill from danger.
125	"Worried Girlfriend"	"Another Danger"	November 4, 2022	N/A
A romantic gesture moves Margie and Captain Rosales to make up. Eloy gets an earful from his worried girlfriend. News about Joey shocks Ali.
126	"Heartbreaking News"	"2 Good Heavy Hearts"	November 7, 2022	N/A
Captain Rosales and the team race against time as new evidence comes out about Miriam's death. A stunned and upset Ali confronts Joey.
127	"A Different Perspective"	"2 Good 2 Be Guilty"	November 8, 2022	N/A
Jill's heart softens toward Hugo when he suffers another episode. Ali considers Joey's innocence, which causes a rift between her and Eloy.
128	"Substantial Evidence"	"2 Good Not 2 Believe"	November 9, 2022	N/A
Ali goes out of her way to help prove Joey's innocence. Despite his resolve to find justice for Miriam's death, Eloy makes a rational decision in court.
129	"It's Complicated"	"2 Good 2 Be Complicated"	November 10, 2022	N/A
Ali and Eloy attempt to sort out the problems surrounding their relationship. A tragic incident forces Ali to abandon her medical school interview.
130	"A Trick of a Lifetime"	"2 Good Finale 2 Remember"	November 11, 2022	N/A
Ali and Eloy emotionally receive news about a loved one. Later, Ali's idea to surprise Eloy doesn't go as planned when he pulls the trick of a lifetime.
