= Knots (EP) =

2018 record by Moira & Nieman

EP by Moira & Nieman
- Released: October 26, 2018
- Genre: R&B
- Length: 19:19
- Label: Tarsier Records
- Producer: Nick Pacoli

Moira & Nieman chronology
Malaya (2018)	Knots (2018)	Patawad (2020)

Singles from Moira
- 1. "Knots" Released: September 27, 2018; 2. "Tell Nobody" Released: October 11, 2018; 3. "Distance" Released: October 26, 2018

Knots is an extended play (EP) by Filipina singer Moira Dela Torre and her cousin, LA-based singer, Nieman Gatus. The EP consists of five tracks. It was released on 26 October 2018 by Tarsier Records.

== Background ==
Two years after the release of their first collaboration EP, Dela Torre and Gatus released their second EP Knots. Its title comes from the third song of the EP, "Knots". All of the songs in Knots EP favored Gatus' genre, and were written by Gatus and Dela Torre. The EP was produced by American producer, Nick Pacoli.

=== Single ===
The first single of the album Knots was released on 27 September 2018. According to Dela Torre, the song was written in a car while Gatus and their producer Nick Pacoli were on their way to the recording studio to record their first collaboration EP Lost In Translation.

The second single Tell Nobody was released on 11 October 2018.

Distance, the third single of the album was released by Tarsier Records on 26 October 2018.

== Track listing ==
5 songs were written by Dela Torre & Gatus.

Knots
No.	Title	Writer(s)	Length
1.	"Promise"	Dela Torre, Gatus	4:12
2.	"Distance"	Dela Torre, Gatus	3:41
3.	"Knots"	Dela Torre, Gatus	3:59
4.	"Tell Nobody"	Dela Torre, Gatus	3:52
5.	"Tell Nobody" (Unplugged)	Dela Torre, Gatus	3:35
Total length:			19:19
