= 2 Good 2 Be True =

2022 Philippine television romantic comedy drama series

- Genre: Drama; Romantic comedy
- Written by: Denise O’Hara; Jaja Amarillo; Jaymar Santos Castro; Raymund Barcelon; Jhon Marc Arizobal
- Directed by: Mae Cruz-Alviar; Paco Sta. Maria
- Starring: Kathryn Bernardo; Daniel Padilla; Ronaldo Valdez
- Music by: Cesar Francis Concio
- Opening theme: "Kumpas" by Moira Dela Torre
- Composers: Moira Dela Torre; Jason Hernandez
- Country of origin: Philippines
- Original languages: Filipino; English
- No. of episodes: 130 (list of episodes)

Production
- Executive producers: Carlo Katigbak; Cory Vidanes; Laurenti Dyogi
- Producers: Mel Mendoza-del Rosario; Fe Catherine D.V. Ancheta; Row Tan
- Editor: Bernie Diasanta
- Running time: 30 minutes
- Production company: RGE Drama Unit

Original release
- Network: Kapamilya Channel (Note: The series was also broadcast on A2Z, Jeepney TV, TV5 and internationally through The Filipino Channel. It was also available on-demand in advanced episodes via Netflix and iWantTFC.)
- Release: May 16 – November 11, 2022

Related
- ReTox: 2 Be Continued

2 Good 2 Be True is a Philippine romantic comedy television series broadcast by Kapamilya Channel. Directed by Mae Cruz-Alviar, it stars Kathryn Bernardo and Daniel Padilla. It aired on the network's Primetime Bida line-up and worldwide on TFC from May 16 to November 11, 2022.

The series marked KathNiel's first teleserye after the shutdown of ABS-CBN in 2020 and it also ultimately became their final project together prior to their breakup on November 30, 2023 (Bonifacio Day). It is also Ronaldo Valdez's final acting appearance before his death on December 17, 2023.

== Premise ==
Car mechanic Eloy (Daniel Padilla) makes a terrible first impression on Ali (Kathryn Bernardo), who works for a real estate magnate. Both of them are hiding their true personas.

== Cast and characters ==
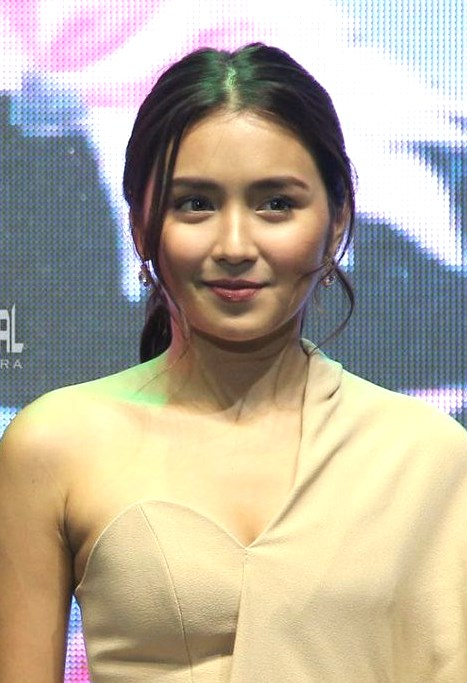
Kathryn Bernardo portrays Alisson "Ali" Fajardo

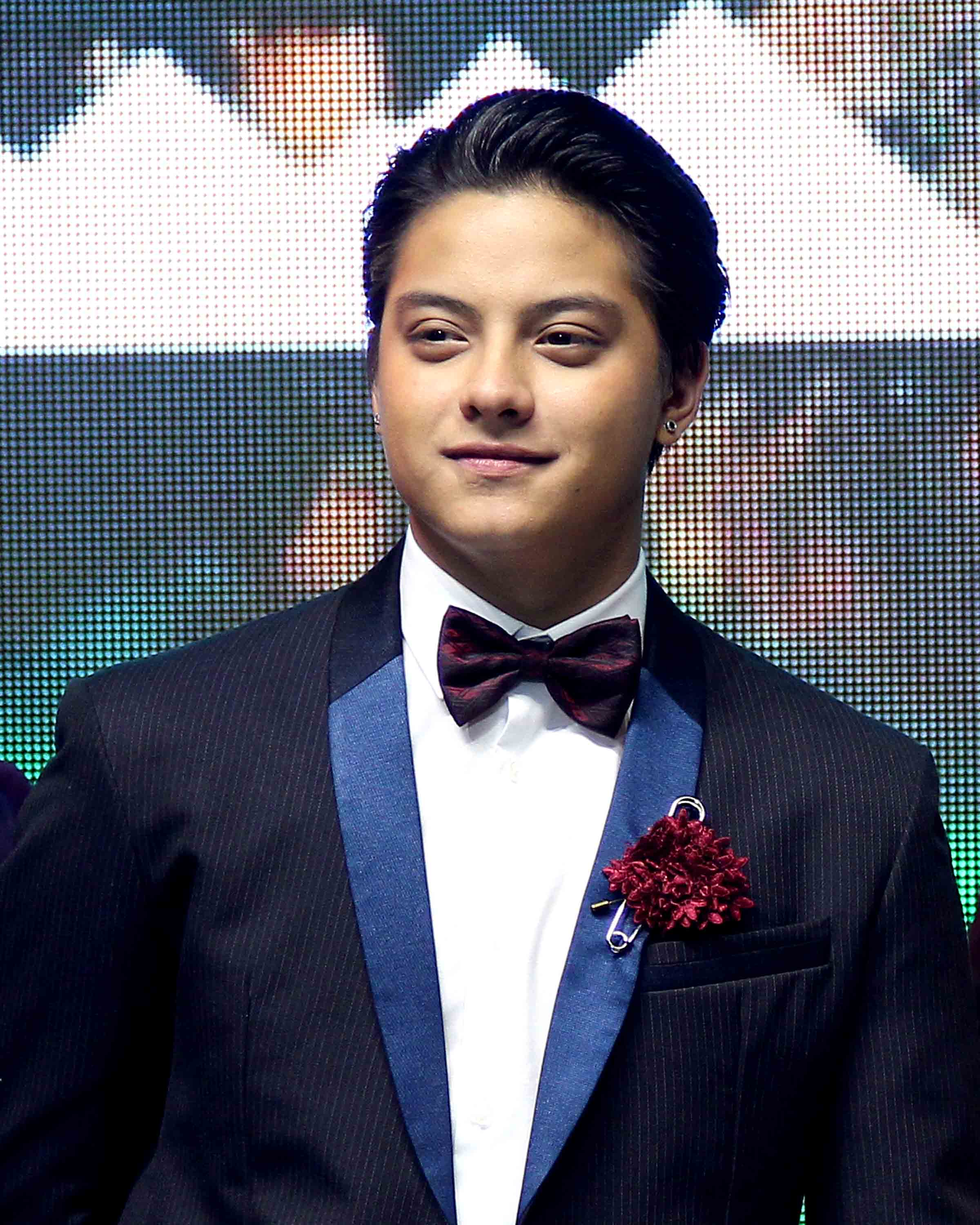
Daniel Padilla portrays Elorde "Eloy" Borja

Main cast

- Kathryn Bernardo as Alisson "Ali" Fajardo-Borja

A bubbly, hardworking nurse at a hospital whose dream is to become a doctor.
- Rhed Bustamante as young Ali

- Daniel Padilla as Elorde "Eloy" Borja

An intelligent young mechanic and law student who vows to free his father from jail, Eloy tries to overcome the grief of his mother's death.
- James Graham as young Eloy

- Ronaldo Valdez as Sebastian "Hugo" Agcaoili

An elder billionaire who owns a construction firm and the One Pacific hotel chain. He is the father of Eloy's mother, Hannah aka Miriam. Older brother of Helena. Hugo was diagnosed Alzheimer's disease which he hides from all the people around him except for Ali and Eloy. He turns out to be Eloy's biological grandfather.
- Dominic Ochoa as young Hugo
Supporting cast

- Gloria Diaz as Helena Agcaoili

Younger sister of Hugo who blames him for the death of her unborn daughter from accident when she was young. Eloy's grandaunt. She is the main antagonist of the series.
- Isabelle Daza as young Helena

- Gelli de Belen as Margielyn "Margie" Fajardo

Mother of Ali and Pat.

- Cris Villanueva as Capt. Rafael Rosales
- Romnick Sarmienta as Frederico "Fred" Borja

- McCoy de Leon as young Fred Eloy's father

- Irma Adlawan as Heart
- Bodjie Pascua as Bartolome "Bart" Panganiban
- Alyssa Muhlach as Jillian "Jill" De Guzman
- Leo Rialp as Atty. Jimmy Manansala

- Ramon Christopher as young Atty. Jimmy

- Gillian Vicencio as Concepcion "Tox" Baquiran
- Bianca de Vera as Patricia "Pat" Cunanan

Younger sister of Ali.

- Raul Montesa as Atty. Ramon Evangelista
  - Jomari Angeles as young Ramon
- Earl Ignacio as Benjamin "Ben" Baquiran
- Smokey Manaloto as Badong Tolentino
- Matt Evans as Arturo “Ays”
- Yves Flores as Alfred "Red"
- Pamu Pamorada as Gemma
- Mary Joy Apostol as Nurse Queenie
- Hyubs Azarcon as Tino
- Via Antonio as Chubs
- Elmo Magalona Atty. Joseph San Pedro

Guest cast

- Agot Isidro as Atty. Roma Badayos

- Dalia Varde as Young Roma

- Ina Raymundo as Olivia Agcaoili
- Mickey Ferriols as Sophia "Hanna" Agcaoili / Miriam Santos-Borja

Eloy's mother who died in the accident
- Michelle Vito as young Hanna/Miriam

- Keempee de Leon as Jose "Joey / Jay" Fajardo

Father of Ali.

- Jenny Miller as Tara Inocencio
- Mercedes Cabral as Abegail Rosales
- Adrianna Agcaoili as Michelle Fuentes
- Rafa Siguion-Reyna as Paul Wilson
- Archie Adamos as older Diego Ramos
- Nor Domingo as Eric Ramos

== Production ==
The working title for the project was Tanging Mahal. Pre-production began on August 30, 2021. The series is produced by RGE Drama Unit. On September 27, 2021, the drama has been officially announced as Too Good to Be True. Principal photography commenced in October 2021.

== Reception ==
During its pilot week, 2 Good 2 Be True became the number-one most watched TV series on Netflix Philippines. The pilot episode drew over 130,000 live concurrent viewers on ABS-CBN's YouTube channel. According to AGB Nielsen Philippines, the series premiered with an 8.0% rating, securing the sixth spot of the rating board, despite having only limited reach on Free TV.

== Release ==
2 Good 2 Be True streamed advanced episodes first on Netflix on May 13, 2022, before releasing on other platforms. The series consists of 130 episodes.

== Spin-off ==
A spin-off series called ReTox: 2 Be Continued premiered from August 1 to 11, 2023 every Tuesdays to Fridays on ABS-CBN Entertainment's YouTube channel consisting in 8 episodes, focusing on the side characters of Red portrayed by Yves Flores and Tox portrayed by Gillian Vicencio and their relationship.

== See also ==
- List of ABS-CBN original drama series
