= Lolito Go =

Filipino songwriter (born 1985)

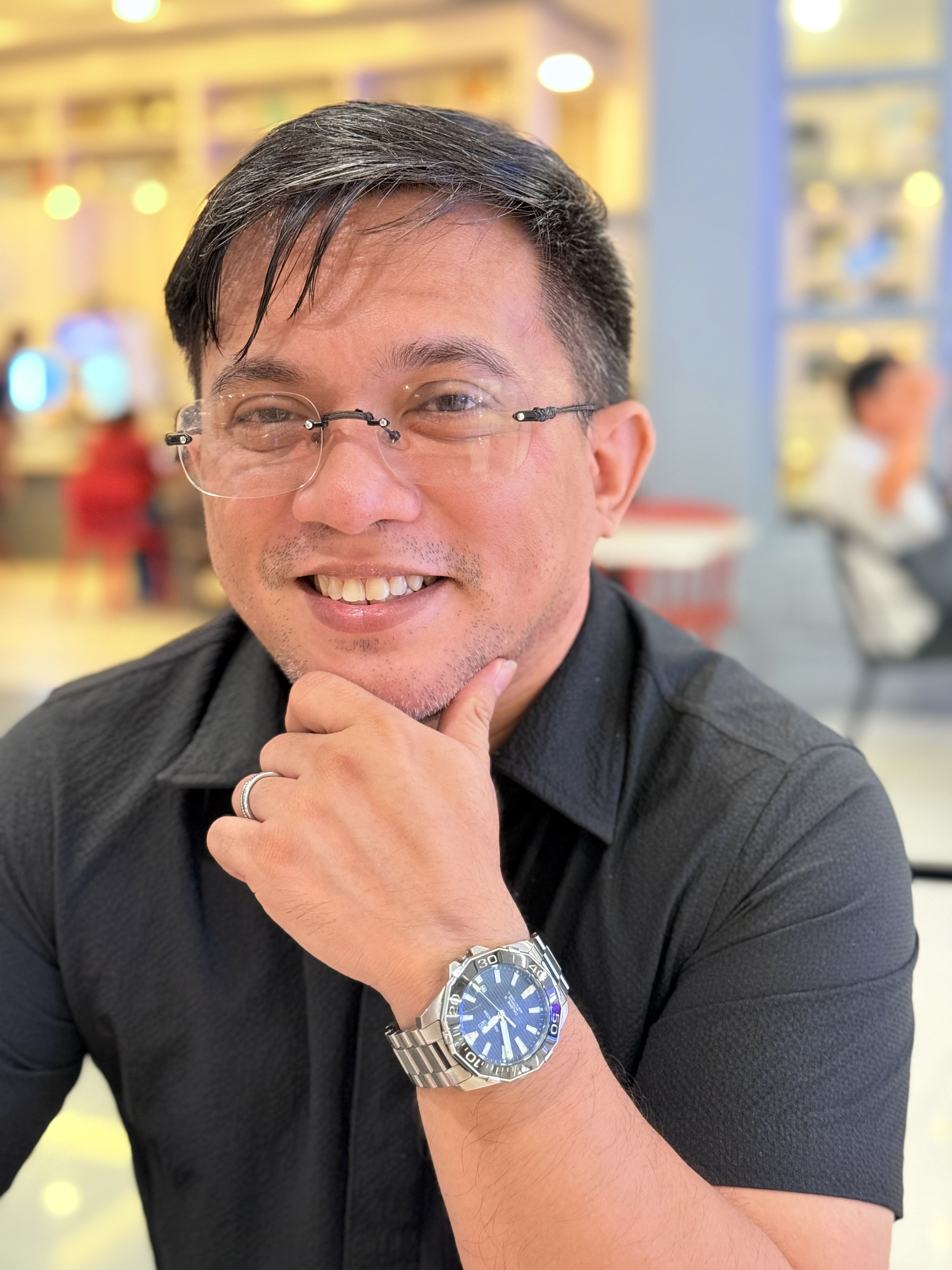

Background information
- Born: Lolito Ramada Go Jr. July 21, 1985 (age 40)
- Origin: Olongapo, Philippines
- Occupations: Songwriter, poet, musician
- Instrument: Ukulele
- Years active: 2016–present

Lolito Ramada Go Jr. (born July 21, 1985) is a Filipino songwriter and poet. He has written songs for television and for several OPM artists. Go gained recognition for composing and performing the ukulele accompaniment for "Titibo-Tibo" (transl. Boyish) which was written by his wife, Libertine Amistoso, and popularized by Moira Dela Torre upon its release in 2017.

== Career ==
In 2016, Go first gained attention for his advocacy songs, including tracks addressing juvenile justice system and extrajudicial killing in the context of the Philippine drug war.

Go gained recognition for composing and playing the ukulele music for "Titibo-Tibo", released in 2017, written by his spouse Libertine Amistoso and popularized by Moira Dela Torre, which won the grand prize at Himig Handog, a national songwriting competition in the Philippines.

From 2019 onward, Go composed songs for music artists like Moira Dela Torre, Juris Fernandez, Bituin Escalante, Elaine Duran, among others.

In 2022, Go and Dela Torre wrote a campaign song "Ipanalo Natin 'To" for former vice president and then presidential aspirant Leni Robredo.

In 2023, Go became involved in a public dispute with singer Dela Torre, alleging that she had hired him as a ghostwriter and defending Jason Marvin Hernandez after their separation. Dela Torre's camp denied the claims. Her mother publicly commented on the dispute, and the parties later reconciled. In the same year, Go was nominated in the 36th Awit Awards for the Song of the Year category.

In 2024, his wedding song "He Knows", performed by Almira Lat, went viral. In the following year, he wrote political jingles for senatorial aspirants Imee Marcos and Gregorio Honasan for the midterm elections.

In 2026, amid the rise of AI-generated music, Go warned against replacing human musicians and encouraged a balanced use of artificial intelligence as a creative tool.

== Works ==
Selected songwriting, composed, and appearances
Year	Song	Performer(s)	Notes
2017	"Titibo-Tibo"	Moira Dela Torre	
2019	Dear Ate Charo	Juris Fernandez	
2020	"Balikan"	Benj Manalo	
2020	"Pahinga"	Moira Dela Torre	
2022	"Ipanalo Natin 'To"	Moira Dela Torre	
2022	Quaranfling	Ken Chan	
2024	"He Knows"	Almira Lat	
2024	"Paglalayag"	Elaine Duran	

== Personal life ==
Go was born and grew up in Olongapo to a family involved in music. His mother was a singer, and his older sister was a member of an all-female band in Olongapo.
