= Dogshow Divas =

Filipino comedy podcast

- Genre: Comedy; Pop culture Improv
- Language: Filipino, English

Cast and voices
- Hosted by: Macoy Dubs; Baus Rufo

Publication
- Original release: September 17, 2025
- Updates: Active

Dogshow Divas is a Filipino comedy and pop culture podcast hosted by content creators Macoy Dubs and Baus Rufo. Launched in September 2025, the program features unscripted conversations regarding daily life, corporate culture, and entertainment. The show is characterized by its satirical and chaotic humor, utilizing the Filipino internet slang concept of "dogshow."

== History ==
=== Formation ===
The podcast was created following a guest appearance by Macoy Dubs on Baus Rufo's existing podcast, Kaya Pa Ba?, in August 2025. Rufo, who had a background in corporate advertising before becoming a content creator, invited Macoy Dubs to celebrate the show's first anniversary. The episode, which the hosts jokingly referred to as the "Dogshow Divas" episode, generated a significant response on social media. Listeners responded positively to the chemistry between the two hosts and the specific topics discussed, such as memories of the retail brand Genevieve Gozum and mall shows at Market! Market!.

Due to the viral reception of the episode, which the hosts now refer to as "Episode Zero," Rufo proposed developing a collaborative show. Macoy Dubs was initially hesitant due to their differing content brands but agreed after seeing the audience demand.

=== Launch and growth ===
Dogshow Divas officially launched its pilot episode, titled "Heto Na Naman Tayo" (transl. Here We Go Again), on YouTube on September 17, 2025. By November 2025, the podcast had reached the Top 6 position on the Spotify podcast charts. Within three months of its debut, the show had released 11 episodes and accumulated over 91,000 followers on Instagram, 49,000 on TikTok, and 73,000 subscribers on YouTube. The hosts have since collaborated with brands mentioned in their episodes, including Uniqlo and McDonald's.

== Format and themes ==
The podcast utilizes an improvisational comedy format. According to Macoy Dubs, the show does not follow a script, outline, or specific flow. The hosts draw upon their previous experiences in the advertising industry and corporate world to discuss topics ranging from office dynamics to regional travel.

The title references the Filipino slang term "dogshow," which refers to satirical mockery or making fun of a situation, person, or event. The hosts have stated that the goal of the podcast is primarily entertainment and satire, with Macoy Dubs noting that the show is "nothing too serious." Rufo has described the production schedule as flexible, without specific upload dates or times.

== Notable episodes ==
In October 2025, an episode discussing the correct pronunciation of musician Ely Buendia's surname went viral. The hosts debated whether it was pronounced "Bwen-ja" or "Bwen-dee-ya." The clip prompted a response from Buendia himself, who posted a video on TikTok clarifying that the correct pronunciation is "Bwen-dee-ya."

== Live performances ==
In November 2025, the podcast announced its first live event, titled "LOREM IPSUM: Dogshow Divas Live Podcast Recording and Audience Dogshowan." The event was scheduled for November 30, 2025, at Brickwall in Bonifacio Global City. Tickets for the event were sold via a tiered system including VIP and standing options.
