= Macoy Dubs =

Filipino content creator and educator

- Born: Mark Lacanlale Averilla
- Education: Colegio de San Juan de Letran (BA)
- Occupations: Content creator; television host; educator; actor
- Years active: 2017–present
- Known for: "Macoy Dubs" videos Auntie Julie; Lunch Out Loud

Mark Lacanlale Averilla, professionally known as Macoy Dubs, is a Filipino content creator, television host, actor, and educator. He is best known for his Tagalog-dubbed videos of popular films and for creating the comedic persona "Auntie Julie".

== Early life and education ==
Mark Averilla's parents separated when he was two years old. As a child, he experienced bullying in grade school due to his weight and asthma.

He attended Colegio de San Juan de Letran in Manila, where he completed a degree in Communication Arts. During his time in school, he was active in theater groups and served as a student council officer.

Before his career in social media, Averilla worked in Qatar as a property consultant. He later returned to the Philippines and worked as a college instructor at his alma mater, Colegio de San Juan de Letran, where he taught advertising and broadcasting.

== Career ==
=== Content creation ===
Averilla began creating content in December 2017. He gained initial popularity on Facebook by posting Tagalog-dubbed versions of clips from Western films such as Mean Girls and The Devil Wears Prada. His dubbing videos popularized the phrase "Ganda ka?" (transl. Are you beautiful?).

In 2019, Averilla revealed that a brand had dropped a collaboration with him because he was considered "too gay," sparking discussions about discrimination in the advertising industry. By 2021, his Facebook page had reached over one million followers.

=== "Auntie Julie" persona ===
During the COVID-19 pandemic in 2020, Averilla introduced a new character named "Auntie Julie" on TikTok. The persona is depicted as a wealthy, progressive aunt from Saint Pedro Poveda College who wears pearl jewelry. The character became known for giving life advice, discussing sex education, and matchmaking her son.

In August 2020, Averilla briefly halted the "Auntie Julie" series, citing "cancel culture" and negative comments that affected his mental health. He resumed the character shortly after receiving support from fans and celebrities.

=== Television, film, and podcasts ===
Averilla transitioned to mainstream television in October 2020 as a host for the noontime variety show Lunch Out Loud on TV5. He also made guest appearances on the ABS-CBN show It's Showtime. In 2024, he participated in auditions for the gag show Bubble Gang.

He made his film debut in the 2024 movie Fruitcake, produced by Cornerstone Studios.

In 2024, Averilla launched a podcast titled "Dogshow Divas" alongside fellow content creator Baus Rufo. He has been recognized as part of the "new comedy royalty" in the Philippines alongside influencers Pipay and Sassa Gurl.

== Activism and advocacy ==
Averilla uses his platform to speak on social issues. In 2020, he was a speaker at the "My Space, My Rights" virtual Children's Rights Summit organized by the European Union Delegation to the Philippines. He also joined other content creators in filing a petition against the Anti-Terrorism Act of 2020 and encouraged the public to speak out against disinformation.

He has partnered with organizations like "We The Youth Vote" to encourage voter registration among the youth. He defines an "influencer" as someone who contributes to the common good and remains socially relevant.

== Personal life ==
Averilla identifies as gay. He has cited actress Jolina Magdangal as a major inspiration for his work and his "Auntie Julie" character; he was previously the president of a Jolina Magdangal fans club chapter.

He is a car enthusiast and creates content related to automotive restoration.

== Public image and controversies ==
In October 2020, Averilla's face accidentally appeared on the Facebook livestream of Cavite Governor Jonvic Remulla due to a technical glitch during a rehearsal. This led to speculation that he was managing the governor's page, which his production team denied.

In July 2021, he deactivated his Twitter account, stating that the platform had become "toxic" and detrimental to his "inner core."

In September 2021, Averilla issued a public apology after an old behind-the-scenes video resurfaced showing him joking with a male colleague. He clarified that the interaction was consensual banter between friends but acknowledged that posting it publicly was a mistake and could be misinterpreted.

Averilla has also gone viral for his humorous ID photos, where he is seen "pouting" in official government documents such as his driver's license and visas.

His approach to dealing with online bashers involves "compartmentalization," as he chooses not to engage with personal attacks. His rise to fame has been discussed in media, noting his financial success as a content creator. Media outlets have also analyzed his astrology chart in relation to his fame.
