= Moira (Moira Dela Torre EP) =

EP by Moira Dela Torre
- Released: August 28, 2014
- Studio: Ivory Music (San Juan, Metro Manila)
- Genre: Pop; soul; OPM
- Length: 24:05
- Label: Ivory Music

Moira Dela Torre chronology
Moira (2014)	Lost In Translation (2016)

Singles from Moira
- 1. "Love Me Instead" Released: August 6, 2014; 2. "Be My Fairytale" Released: October 20, 2017

Moira is the first extended play (EP) by Filipina singer Moira Dela Torre. The EP is self-titled and consists of six tracks, all songs were originally written by Moira Dela Torre herself.

== Background ==
After joining the first season of The Voice of the Philippines, Dela Torre has kept her music career on track by working on corporate jingles and theme songs: including McDonald's "Hooray for Today", Surf's "Pinalaki", and Johnson & Johnson's "Signature of Love". In 2014, Dela Torre caught the attention of Ivory Music and offered her a recording contract for her self-titled debut EP, Moira.

== Track listing ==
6 songs were written by Dela Torre.

Moira
No.	Title	Writer(s)	Length
1.	"Love Me Instead"	Dela Torre	3:28
2.	"Be My Fairytale"	Dela Torre	3:52
3.	"Happily Ever After"	Dela Torre	4:30
4.	"If You Tell Me You Love Me"	Dela Torre	4:07
5.	"After Your Heart"	Dela Torre	4:32
6.	"Wala Nang Kulang Pa" (featuring Sam Milby)	Dela Torre	3:36
Total length:			24:05
