= Jaya discography =

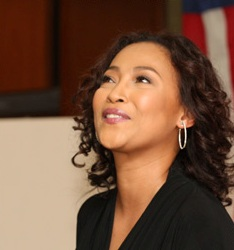
- Studio albums: 12
- Live albums: 1
- Compilation albums: 5
- Singles: 36
- Holiday albums: 1

The discography of Jaya, a Filipina singer, consists of twelve studio albums, thirty singles, and one live album as of 2019. Jaya is known in the Philippines as the Queen of Soul. Born Maria Luisa Ramsey on March 21, 1970 in Manila, Philippines, the name Jaya came from her record label LMR Records when they signed her as their recording artist in 1989.

Her biggest break in the Philippine music scene came when she won first place in the 1996 Metropop Song Festival for her interpretation of "Sometimes You Just Know" by Edith Gallardo and Danny Tan. She also won Best Interpreter at the Asia Song Festival held in Hong Kong in February 1997 for her rendition of the song "You Lift Me Up", composed by Danny Tan with lyrics by Dodjie Simon. This composition also won grand prize, the Best Song award. She sold total of 1 million records worldwide.

== Albums ==
=== Studio albums ===
List of albums, with sales and certifications
Title	Album details	Sales	Certifications
Jaya	Released: September 1, 1989 (US); Label: RCA/LMR; Formats: LP, Cassette, CD, Digital Download		
Jaya	Released: June 16, 1996 (PH); Label: Viva; Formats: Cassette, CD, Digital Download	PHI: 360,000	PARI: 9× Platinum
In the Raw	Released: August 9, 1997 (PH); Label: Viva; Formats: Cassette, CD, Digital Download	PHI: 200,000	PARI: 5× Platinum
Kung Kailan Pasko	Released: 1998; Label: Viva; Formats: Cassette, CD, Digital Download	PHI: 20,000	
Honesty	Released: July 7, 1999 (PH); Label: Viva; Formats: Cassette, CD, Digital Download	PHI: 28,000	PARI: Gold
Jaya	Released: 2001 (JPN); Label: AMS Records; Formats: CD		
Unleashed	Released: 2002 (PH); Label: Viva; Formats: Cassette, CD, Digital Download	PHI: 20,000	
Fall In Love Again	Released: May 23, 2005 (PH); Label: Viva; Formats: CD, Digital Download	PHI: 10,000	
Cool Change	Released: October 28, 2007 (PH); Label: GMA Records; Formats: CD, Digital Download	PHI: 15,000	PARI: Gold
Real.Love.Stories	Released: August 23, 2009 (PH); Label: GMA Records; Formats: CD, Digital Download	PHI: 3,000	
All Souled Out	Released: July 15, 2011 (PH); Label: Universal; Formats: CD, Digital Download	PHI: 5,000	
Queen Of Soul	Released: March 22, 2019 (PH); Label: Star Music; Formats: Digital Download		

=== Compilation albums ===
Year	Album details	Certifications / sales
A Love Album	Released: 1998 (PH); Label: PolyMax/PolyGram; Formats: CD, Cassette	PHI: 30,000
Five	Released: September 16, 2000; Label: Viva; Formats: CD, Cassette, Digital Download	PARI: Platinum; PHI: 40,000
Silver Series	Released: August 29, 2006-; Label: Viva; Formats: CD, Digital Download	
18 Greatest Hits	Released: October 7, 2009; Label: Viva; Formats: CD, Digital Download	
OPM Side by Side Hits of Jaya and Janno Gibbs	Released: March 9, 2012; Formats: Digital Download; Label: Viva/Vicor	

=== Live albums ===
Year	Album details
Live at the Araneta	Released: 2001; Label: Viva; Formats: CD, Cassette, Digital Download

== Singles ==
The following songs were released in the Philippines as promotional singles for radio and television, as physical singles have never been released there (only albums). An asterisk indicates that the single was released both in the country and in the United States and Japan.

Date	Single
1989	"If You Leave Me Now" * (US Billboard Hot 100: #44) "Shadow Love" * "One Kiss Per Minute" *
1996	"Where Do We Go from Here" "Laging Naro'n Ka" "Hanggang Ngayo'y Mahal" "Sometimes You Just Know" "Dahil Tanging Ikaw"
1997	"Dahil Ba Sa Kanya" "Wala Na Bang Pag-ibig" "I Won't Let You Go Again" "I Still Believe in Love" "Sana Maulit Muli"
1998	"Give Love on Christmas Day" "O Holy Night"
1999	"Honesty" "Mula Sa Puso" "Dito Sa Puso Ko"
2000	"Ikaw Lamang" with Janno Gibbs "Habang May Buhay" with Regine Velasquez "Kung Wala Na"
2001	"Love Hurts" "Beauty and Madness" "Umasa Nang Labis"
2005	"Ako'y Sa'yo" "I Just Fall in Love Again" "Di Na Ba Kita Mapipigilan"
2007	"Is It Over?" "Just Once" "Points of View" duet with Regine Velasquez
2008	"One Proud Mama"
2009	"All of My Life" "Hiding Inside Myself"
2011	"Making Love"
2012	"Mga Nakaw Na Sandali" with Jay R
2014	"Ikaw Ako at Siya" duet with Janno Gibbs, and Julie Anne San Jose "Isang Araw"
2019	"'Di Ko Kaya" with Erik Santos "Hanggang Dito Na Lang" "Kasalanan Ko Ba" "Tayo Pala Talaga"
2021	"Hallelujah To The One" "Ngayong Pasko"
2022	"Have Yourself A Merry Little Christmas" with Garth Garcia

== See also ==
- List of best-selling albums in the Philippines
