= Titibo-Tibo =

Single by Moira Dela Torre

Single by Moira Dela Torre

from the album Malaya
- Released: February 18, 2018
- Recorded: 2017
- Genre: Pop
- Length: 3:22
- Label: Star Music
- Songwriter: Libertine Amistoso

Moira Dela Torre singles chronology
"Torete" (2017)	"Titibo-Tibo" (2018)	"Ikaw At Ako" (2019)

Music video
- "Titibo-Tibo" on YouTube

"Titibo-Tibo" (transl. Boyish) is a song recorded by Filipino singer Moira Dela Torre for her debut studio album Malaya. It was composed by Libertine Amistoso and it is only interpreted by Moira. The song won at the competition Himig Handog 2017 at the end of November held on ASAP. It was released for digital download and streaming on February 18, 2018, through Star Music. This song also topped that charts for 2 weeks on the Philippine Hot 100.

The song centers around a tomboyish girl who transforms her personality and adopts more traditionally feminine behaviors after falling in love with a boy. According to Amistoso, the song is inspired by her own life experiences.

== Live performances ==
Dela Torre performed "Titibo-Tibo" for the first time at Himig Handog pre-finals on October 15, 2017, and October 16, 2017, followed by the grand finals on November 26, 2020, on ASAP. It was the most viewed performances on Himig Handog 2017.

On December 10, 2017, Dela Torre performed "Titibo-Tibo" on Asap Chillout.

During her grand album launch on Eastwood Mall Open Park, she also performed "Titibo-Tibo" on March 11, 2018.

On December 19, 2018, she performed the song on Myx Philippines.

During One Music X Abu Dhabi along with Filipino artists Inigo Pascual, Maris Racal, Aegis, KZ Tandingan, Maja Salvador, Moira performed "Titibo-Tibo" with her guitarist husband Jason Marvin Hernandez.

At her successful "Braver" concert, she performed the song, as well as her other hit songs "Sundo", "Saglit", and "Torete".

On February 1, 2018, she performed "Titibo-Tibo" on a radio station Wish 107.5.

== Music video ==
The music video depicts the transformation of a tomboyish girl who changes her life and personality after meeting a boy who captures her heart. The narrative follows her journey from elementary school through her college years, illustrating the impact of this relationship. Moira visually portrays this evolving story throughout the video. The music video was released on November 4, 2017, on ABS-CBN Star Music's official YouTube Channel. As of December 20, 2020, the video has garnered over 4 million views.

== Notable covers ==
- On March 7, 2020, Jessie Gonzales performed and sang "Titibo-Tibo" on a reality television singing competition, The Voice Teens 2.
- On December 2, 2017, Andel had a chance to sing with Moira Dela Torre on a variety show Little Big Shots.

== Media usage ==
- A version of the song with the original lyrics was used in an Ellips advertisement featuring Moira and Jason.

== Awards ==
Year	Awards ceremony	Award	Results
2018	Awit Awards	Best Performance by a Female Recording Artist	Won
2018	Awit Awards	People's Voice Favorite Song	Won
2018	Awit Awards	Song of the Year	Nominated
2018	Myx Music Awards	Song of the Year	Nominated
2018	Awit Awards	People's Voice Favorite Record of the Year	Nominated
2018	Awit Awards	Record of the Year	Nominated

== Chart history ==
Chart (2017)	Peak Position
Philippine Hot 100 (Billboard Philippines)	1
