= Malaya (Moira Dela Torre album) =

Studio album by Moira Dela Torre
- Released: February 19, 2018
- Studio: Star Music (Quezon City, Metro Manila)
- Genre: Pop, Soul, OPM
- Length: 55:30
- Label: Star Music

Moira Dela Torre chronology
Lost In Translation (2016)	Malaya (2018)	Knots (2018)

Singles from Malaya
- 1. "Torete" Released: August 25, 2017; 2. "Malaya" Released: September 18, 2017; 3. "Sundo" Released: October 6, 2017; 4. "Tagpuan" Released: January 25, 2018; 5. "You Are My Sunshine" Released: February 2, 2018

Malaya (English: Freedom) is the debut studio album by Filipina singer Moira Dela Torre. It was released in 2018 by Star Music. The album consists of thirteen tracks, ten original songs and three covers. The album was awarded an eight-time platinum certification in 2020.

== Background ==
Dela Torre started out doing covers and online corporate jingles including McDonald's "Hooray for Today", Surf's "Pinalaki", and Johnson & Johnson's "Signature of Love".

"Malaya" was initially released on 17 February 2018, during her first solo concert at New Frontier Theater in Cubao, Quezon City, Metro Manila.

=== Singles ===
The first single of the album Torete (originally sung by Moonstar88) was released on 25 August 2017. The song was used as a soundtrack for the movie Love You to the Stars and Back, a film starring Julia Barretto and Joshua Garcia.

The second single Malaya was released on 18 September 2017. The song is one of the soundtracks of the movie Camp Sawi, a Filipino comedy-drama film starring Andi Eigenmann, Bela Padilla, Yassi Pressman, Kim Molina, Sam Milby and Arci Muñoz.

The third single Sundo (originally sung by Imago) was released on 6 October 2017. The song was used as a soundtrack for the Filipino family drama television series The Good Son, starring Joshua Garcia, Jerome Ponce, McCoy de Leon, and Nash Aguas, with Eula Valdez, Mylene Dizon, John Estrada, Loisa Andalio, Elisse Joson, Alexa Ilacad and Albert Martinez.

The fourth single of the album, Tagpuan was released on 25 January 2018. The music video of the song was released on 29 April 2019. The first three minutes of the eight-minute music video features Dela Torre looking back at her painful memories, Dela Torre got the surprise of her life when her best friend Jason Hernandez proposed, right at the end of the music video. During her interview with Boy Abunda in the late-night talk show Tonight with Boy Abunda, Dela Torre said that her song Tagpuan was one of the hardest song she has ever written.

The fifth single You Are My Sunshine (originally sung by Jimmie Davis) was released on 2 February 2018. The song is one of the soundtracks of the movie Meet Me in St. Gallen, a Filipino romantic comedy-drama film starring Carlo Aquino and Bela Padilla.

== Track listing ==
9 songs were written by Dela Torre.

Malaya
No.	Title	Writer(s)	Length
1.	"Malaya"	Dela Torre	5:20
2.	"We & Us"	Dela Torre	4:18
3.	"Before It Sinks In"	Dela Torre	4:23
4.	"Langit Lupa" (featuring Iñigo Pascual)	Dela Torre	4:00
5.	"Sabi-Sabi"	Dela Torre	4:02
6.	"Take Her to the Moon"	Dela Torre	5:23
7.	"Tagu-Taguan"	Dela Torre	4:09
8.	"Tagpuan"	Dela Torre	4:20
9.	"You Are My Sunshine" (A cover from Jimmie Davis)	Mitchell	2:44
10.	"Saglit" (Marco's Theme from The Better Half)	Dela Torre	4:23
11.	"Sundo" (A cover from Imago)	de Leon, Lucero	4:31
12.	"Torete" (A cover from Moonstar88)	Hernandez	4:32
13.	"Titibo-Tibo"	Amistoso	3:22
Total length:			55:30

== Certification ==
Region	Certification	Certified units/sales
Philippines (PARI)	8× Platinum	120,000^{*}
^{*} Sales figures based on certification alone.

== Appearances in the media ==
"Before It Sinks In" was used as the eviction song of Pinoy Big Brother: Otso.
