= Moira Dela Torre =

Filipina singer (born 1993)

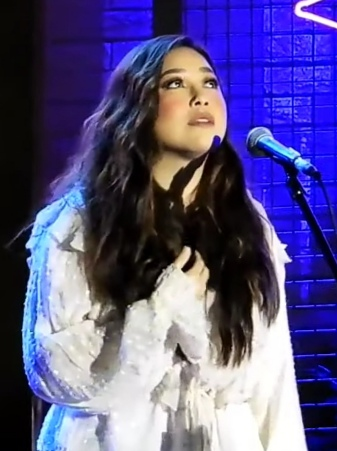
- Dela Torre in 2019
- Born: Moira Rachelle Bustamante Dela Torre; November 4, 1993 (age 32); Olongapo, Philippines
- Occupations: Singer; songwriter; actress
- Years active: 2011–present
- Agent: Cornerstone Entertainment
- Spouse: Jason Hernandez (m. 2019; sep. 2022)
- Musical career
- Genres: Pop; soul; OPM
- Instruments: Vocals; guitar
- Labels: Star Music; Republic; UMG Philippines

Moira Rachelle Bustamante Dela Torre (born November 4, 1993) is a Filipino singer, songwriter and actress. Born in Olongapo, she began as a voice artist for corporate jingles and theme songs. In 2013, Dela Torre competed in The Voice of the Philippines, releasing her debut EP Moira following her stint in the show. Dela Torre rose to fame after interpreting Libertine Amistoso's "Titibo-Tibo" in the Himig Handog songwriting competition, in which it won. She gained further success with her 2018 debut album, Malaya, which was awarded an eight-time platinum certification in 2020.

== Early life ==
Moira Rachelle Bustamante Dela Torre was born on November 4, 1993, in Olongapo, Philippines, to a music-oriented family. She wrote her first song, "After Your Heart", at the age of 12; the song would later be featured on her self-titled debut EP album released nine years later.

== Career ==
=== Career beginnings ===
Dela Torre's career started as a voice artist working on corporate jingles and theme songs, including McDonald's "Hooray for Today", Surf's "Pinalaki", and Johnson & Johnson's "Signature of Love".

In 2013, Dela Torre auditioned in the first season of The Voice of the Philippines, singing "Hallelujah" by Bamboo Mañalac. She turned only one chair, that of apl.de.ap, and thus becoming a member of his team and advancing to the "battle round" of the show. She was eliminated in the battles, having been defeated by Penelope Matanguihan. Following her appearance in the show, she released her first single titled "Love Me Instead" through her debut EP album titled Moira, which was released under Ivory Music.

=== 2016–2017: Himig Handog, Malaya ===
Dela Torre performed singles for the official soundtracks of the romantic films Camp Sawi and Love You to the Stars and Back, namely "Malaya", and a cover of Moonstar88's "Torete".

In October 2017, she performed in the finals of the songwriting and music video competition Himig Handog. She served as the interpreter for Libertine Amistoso's song, "Titibo-Tibo". The song would become the grand winner of the competition; the performance for the competition became the most viewed performance for that year's edition. In late October, she became a member of the acoustic group ASAP Jambayan.

=== 2018–2020: Idol Philippines ===
In February 2018, her first concert "Tagpuan" sold out in four days on its first night; it was directed by John Prats. Due to public demand, the concert had a second night. Her 2018 debut album, Malaya, featured her hit singles "Malaya" and "Tagpuan". In December 2018, she became Spotify's No. 1 most streamed artist in the Philippines. Malaya album was certified 8× Platinum in the Philippines with more than 120,000 copies sold, making it the best-selling album in 2018.

Also, she became one of the judges in Idol Philippines, and on September of the said year, staged her second major concert at the Araneta Coliseum titled Braver.

=== 2020–present: Patawad, "I'm Okay" ===
In March 2020, her second studio album Patawad was released. The album spawned the hit singles "Mabagal" featuring Daniel Padilla, "Patawad, Paalam" and "Paalam" featuring Ben&Ben. The album was certified Platinum in the Philippines with more than 15,000 copies sold.

In 2022, Dela Torre officially signed with UMG Philippines sub-label, Republic Records Philippines. In the same year, she expressed support for the presidential bid of Leni Robredo through the song "Ipanalo Natin 'To", which she co-wrote with Lolito Go.

On January 20, 2023, she released "Ikaw at Sila", the first song in her upcoming album. The song modified the lyrics of previous works written with Jason Hernandez, to reflect their separation in the previous year. Dela Torre later embarked on a world tour in support of her upcoming album. At the first show at the Araneta Coliseum, she performed several unreleased songs—"Red Flags", "Eme", "Under The Bathroom Sink", and "Rewritten Vows"—which went viral across social media platforms and received a positive response from the public.

In May 2024, Dela Torre revealed in an Instagram post that she achieved two billion Spotify streams, becoming the first OPM solo artist and the second overall after Ben&Ben.

In November 2024, Dela Torre released her fourth album under Republic Records Philippines entitled "I'm Okay" with 4 Tagalog tracks and 8 English tracks. Namely, Where It All Started, Under the Bathroom Sink, Bandaid, Red Flags, San Ka Na, Umpisa, Ghosts, Gaslighter, Delusional, "I'm Okay", Wonder, and Dinggin. She described the album to be her most candid and confessional album she has written.

== Personal life ==
Dela Torre is a devout Christian, but has said "I don't like imposing my convictions on other people." She considers writing and performing worship songs her passion. Jason Hernandez announced his separation with Dela Torre on May 31, 2022, admitting his infidelity to her during their marriage.

Of her "ritual" before performing, Dela Torre told the Philippine magazine Yes!: "Before performing, I just go to the banyo [restroom] and poop. Otherwise, I'll just fart [while performing], which I've done a number of times." She also revealed that two months after her marriage, she underwent a botched nose job, from which she recovered three months later while confined at home. According to Dela Torre, the non-invasive procedure had resulted in necrosis that put her "at high risk of being blind, of aneurysm, of heart attack, and stroke". Despite this, she said she had forgiven the surgeon who carried out the procedure and did not file a complaint.

== Artistry ==
=== Musical style and influences ===
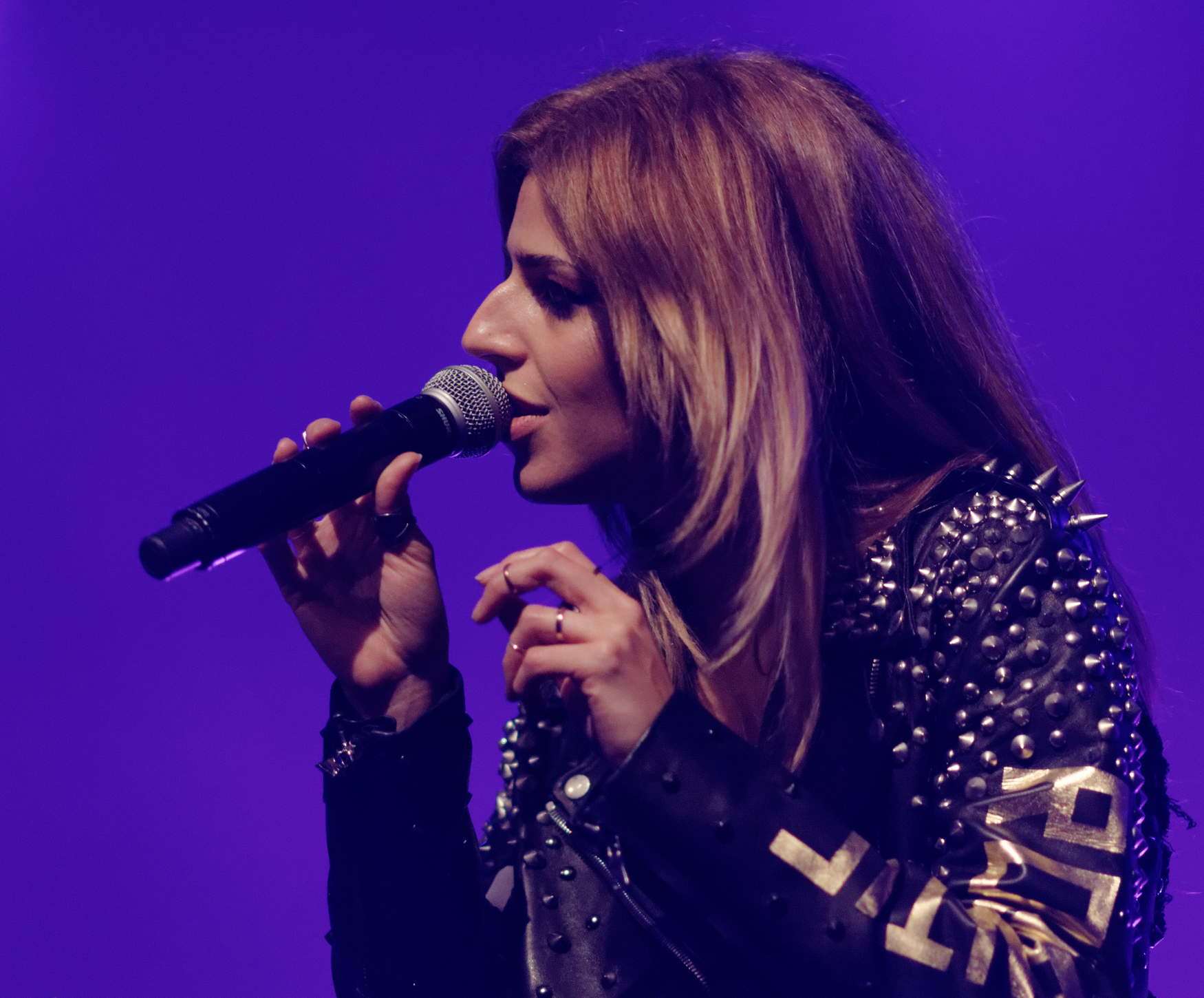
Dela Torre cites Brooke Fraser as her main musical inspiration.

Dela Torre has said that she was heavily influenced by Brooke Fraser and was the artist that inspired her to write her own music. Her music, primarily in pop, has been described as soothing and emotional. Referred to as the "OPM Queen" by Nylon Manila, her sound has become one of the most popular tunes in the mainstream and has been dominating the radio stations and music channels, television shows and film soundtracks.

=== Voice and timbre ===
Dela Torre is lauded for her "heartfelt" and "angelic voice." Lea Salonga called her as "The Voice of the New Generation." Her voice is described as "airy" and "soothing", noted for her distinct "melancholic" singing style that has since become her signature sound in her records.

== Filmography ==
=== Film ===
Year	Title	Role	Notes	Ref.
2020	Hayop Ka!	Iñigo's sister (voice)	Debut film appearance	
2024	Becky & Badette	Herself	Cameo	

=== Television ===
Year	Title	Role	Notes	Ref.
2013	The Voice of the Philippines	Herself	Contestant (season 1)	
2017–present	ASAP	Herself	Mainstay performer	
2019	Idol Philippines	Herself	Judge	
2022	Idol Philippines	Herself	Judge	
2024	It's Showtime	Herself	Guest performer	
2025	Eat Bulaga!	Herself	Guest performer	

== Discography ==
- Malaya (2018)
- Patawad (2020)
- Halfway Point (Reimagined) (2021)
- I’m Okay (2024)
