= List of Himig Handog finalists =

The following is a list of the songs that reached the finals of Himig Handog, a songwriting competition in the Philippines.

== 2000 ==
#	Song	Artist	Composer(s)	Notes
1	"Lipad ng Pangarap"	Dessa	Arnel De Pano	
2	"Super Pinoy"	Jolina Magdangal feat. Quarter to Five	Jungee Marcelo	Youth's Choice; OFW's Choice
3	"Para Sa’yo"	Dianne dela Fuente & The Bataoke Kids	Trina Belamide	
4	"Larawan"	Anna Fegi	Dodjie Simon	People's Choice Award
5	"Ang Galing Mo"	Reuben Laurente with 92AD	Erick Sta. Maria	
6	"Bayani"	Zebedee Zuñiga, Bayang Barrios & Katrice Gavino	Mike Villegas	
7	"Ako, Ikaw, Tayo"	Jimmy Bondoc & The Essence Band	Ronald Sorioso	
8	"Maging Isang Bayani"	Cookie Chua	Allan Feliciano & Ces Datu	
9	"Ikaw ay Bayani"	III of a Kind	Noel Cabangon	
10	"Si Ka Bayani"	Gary Granada	Soc Villanueva & Arnel De Pano	Grand Winner

== 2001 ==
#	Song	Artist	Composer(s)	Notes
1	"Network 'I'"	17:28	Paulino Armesin Jr.	
2	"Jam"	Kevin Roy & Cookie Chua	Mike Villegas	Highly Commended
3	"Kahit Pilitin Pa"	Dianne Dela Fuente	Arnel De Pano	
4	"K Naman"	Noel Cabangon & Ang Tropang Papuri	Jungee Marcelo	
5	"Free"	Roselle Nava & Bukas Palad	Gino Torres	
6	"You Can Make It Happen"	Radha	Dodjie Simon & Ellis Simon	Best Interpreter
7	"Si Eddie"	Dingdong Avanzado	Laarnie Matta Macaraeg & Luz Ching Pumarega	Netsurfer's Choice; Listener's Choice; Reader's Choice
8	"True Luv"	Mike & Noah	Mike Luis	
9	"Someday"	Barbie's Cradle	Jimmy Antiporda	
10	"Tara Tena"	Kyla, Kaya & V3	Jonathan Manalo	Winner

== 2002 ==
#	Song	Artist	Composer(s)	Notes
1	"This Guy's In Love With You, Pare"	Chito Miranda (Finals: Rico Blanco)	Michael Angelo Villegas & Allan Feliciano	
2	"Hindi Na Bale"	Jessa Zaragoza (Finals: Arnie Hidalgo)	Jimmy Antiporda	
3	"Sabi Na Nga Ba"	Tootsie Guevarra (Finals: Kyla)	Arnie Mendaros	
4	"Love Has Come My Way"	Heart Evangelista (Finals: Session Road)	Leonardo Quinitio	Listeners' Choice Award; Texters' Choice Award
5	"Bakit?"	Gloc-9 & Cookie Chua	Aristotle Pollisco & Mike Villegas	
6	"Only I"	Dianne dela Fuente	Brian Cua & Jason Icasiano	
7	"Hanggang"	Wency Cornejo	Gigi & Ronaldo Cordero	
8	"Kailanpaman"	Kevin Roy (Finals: Kevin Roy & Razorback)	Mike Villegas	
9	"Kung Ako Na Lang Sana"	Bituin Escalante	Soc Villanueva	Winner; Best Interpreter
10	"Kung Ako Ba Siya?"	Piolo Pascual (Finals: Rannie Raymundo)	Arnold Reyes	Buyers' Choice Award

== 2003 ==
#	Song	Artist	Composer(s)	Notes
1	"Bye Bye Na"	Rico Blanco	Ted Reyes & Jeff Antiporda	
2	"Kailan Kita Mamahalin"	Anna Fegi	Arnel De Pano	Winner
3	"Alam Kong Di Ako, Okey Lang"	Bayani Agbayani	Rommel Tuico & Jason Dacua	
4	"Susubukan Kong Muli"	Jessa Zaragoza	Jan Lopez	
5	"Last Love Song"	17:28 & Heart Evangelista	Ron Jansen Solis	
6	"Kailan Ka Darating"	Rachel Alejandro & Wency Cornejo	Wency Cornejo	
7	"Maibabalik Ko Ba?"	Josh Santana	Marc Bryan Adona	
8	"Stop Think"	Aliya Parcs	Aliya Parcs & Allan Feliciano	
9	"Huwag Ka Nang Umiyak"	True Faith	Ron Jansen Solis	
10	"Narito Lang Ako"	Vina Morales	Chona Borromeo	

== 2013 ==
#	Song	Artist	Composer(s)	Notes
1	"Nasa Iyo Na Ang Lahat"	Daniel Padilla	Jungee Marcelo	MOR Listener's Choice; Tambayan 101.9 Choice; Star Records Buyer's Choice; MYX Best Video
2	"Alaala"	Yeng Constantino	Ma. Fe Mechenette, G. Tianga, Melvin Muervana & Joel Jabat Jr.	
3	"If You Ever Change Your Mind"	Marion Aunor	Marion Aunor	3rd Best Song
4	"Sana’y Magbalik"	Jovit Baldivino	Arman Alferez	
5	"Hanggang Wakas"	Juris	Soc Villanueva	2nd Best Song
6	"This Song Is For You"	Erik Santos	Jude Gitamondoc	TFC's Choice Award
7	"Pwede Bang Ako Na Lang Ulit?"	Bugoy Drilon	Jeffrey Cifra	
8	"Tamang Panahon"	Wynn Andrada	Wynn Andrada	
9	"One Day"	Angeline Quinto	Agatha Morallos	
10	"Scared To Death"	KZ Tandingan	Domingo Rosco Jr.	4th Best Song
11	"Kahit Na"	Toni Gonzaga	Julius James de Belen	5th Best Song
12	"Anong Nangyari Sa Ating Dalawa?"	Ice Seguerra	Jovinor Tan	Winner

== 2014 ==
#	Song	Artist	Composer(s)	Notes
1	"Walang Basagan ng Trip"	Jugs Jugueta & Teddy Corpuz	Eric De Leon	4th Best Song
2	"Akin Ka Na Lang"	Morissette	Francis Louis Salazar	
3	"Pumapag-ibig"	Marion Aunor, Rizza Cabrera & Seed Bunye	Jungee Marcelo	
4	"Pare, Mahal Mo Raw Ako"	Michael Pangilinan	Jovinor Tan	
5	"Mahal Kita Pero"	Janella Salvador	Melchora Mabilog	3rd Best Song; MYX Best Music Video Award
6	"Umiiyak ang Puso"	Bugoy Drilon	Rolando Azor	
7	"Mahal Ko O Mahal Ako"	KZ Tandingan	Edwin Marollano	Winner; Favorite Interpreter
8	"Halik sa Hangin"	Ebe Dancel & Abra	David Dimaguila	2nd Best Song; Star Cinema Choice Award
9	"Hanggang Kailan"	Angeline Quinto	Jose Joel Mendoza	
10	"Dito"	Jovit Baldivino	Raizo Chabeldin & Biv De Vera	
11	"Everything Takes Time"	Hazel Faith Dela Cruz	Hazel Faith Dela Cruz	
12	"If You Don't Want to Fall"	Jed Madela	Jude Gitamondoc	TFC Choice Award; Starstudio Reader's Choice Award
13	"Hindi Wala"	Juris	Nica Del Rosario	5th Best Song
14	"Bumabalik ang Nagdaan"	Jessa Zaragoza	Sarah Jane Gandia	Star Music Listener's Choice Award
15	"Simpleng Tulad Mo"	Daniel Padilla	Meljohn Magno	ABS-CBN Mobile Choice Award; MOR Listeners' Choice Award

== 2016 ==
#	Song	Artist	Composer(s)	Notes
1	"Parang Tayo Pero Hindi"	Angeline Quinto & Michael Pangilinan	Marlon Barnuevo	5th Best Song
2	"Minamahal Pa Rin Ako"	Daryl Ong	Rolando Azor	
3	"Diamante"	Morissette	Jungee Marcelo	
4	"Sana'y Tumibok Muli"	Klarisse de Guzman	Jose Joel Mendoza	
5	"Laban Pa"	KZ Tandingan & Jay R	David Dimaguila	3rd Best Song
6	"O Pag-Ibig"	Ylona Garcia & Bailey May	Honlani Rabe & Jack Rufo	MOR 101.9 Choice; TFC's Global Choice; One Music PH Favorite Interpreter; MYX Best Music Video
7	"Patay Na Si Uto"	Nyoy Volante	Oliver Narag	
8	"Ambon"	Barbie Almalbis	Gianina Camille del Rosario	
9	"Mananatili"	Janella Salvador & Marlo Mortel	Francis Louis Salazar	
10	"Maghihintay Ako"	Jona	Dante Bantatua	
11	"Monumento"	Kyla & Kris Lawrence	Jungee Marcelo	2nd Best Song
12	"Nyebe"	Kaye Cal	Aries Sales	Star Music Choice Award
13	"Bibitawan Ka"	Juris	Hazel Faith dela Cruz	
14	"Dalawang Letra"	The Itchyworms	Davey Langit	Winner
15	"Tama Lang"	Jolina Magdangal	Agatha & Melvin Morallos	4th Best Song

== 2017 ==
#	Song	Artist	Composer(s)	Notes
1	"Extensyon"	Iñigo Pascual feat. Aikee	Michael “Aikee” Aplacador	3rd Best Song
2	"Bes"	Migz Haleco	Eric De Leon	
3	"Naririnig Mo Ba"	Morissette	LJ Manzano & Joan Da	
4	"The Labo Song"	Kaye Cal	Karl Gurano & Teodoro “Teddy” Katigbak	Star Music Choice Award
5	"Bagyo"	Jake Zyrus	Agatha Morallos	
6	"Tanghaling Tapat"	Unit406	Gabriel Tagadtad	5th Best Song
7	"Tayo na Lang Kasi"	Kyla & Jason Dy	Soc Villanueva	MOR 101.9 Choice; One Music PH Favorite Interpreter; MYX Best Music Video
8	"Titibo-Tibo"	Moira Dela Torre	Libertine Amistoso	Winner
9	"Wow na Feelings"	Janella Salvador	Karlo Zabala	4th Best Song; TFC's Global Choice Award
10	"Sampu"	Jona	Raizo Chabeldin & Biv De Vera	2nd Best Song

== 2018 ==
#	Song	Artist	Composer(s)	Notes
1	"Tinatapos Ko Na"	Jona	Sarah Jane Gandia	5th Best Song; Producer's Award
2	"Wala Kang Alam"	Sam Mangubat	Martin John Arellano & Mel Magno	One Music PH Favorite Interpreter
3	"Dalawang Pag-Ibig Niya"	Krystal Brimner, Sheena Belarmino & MNL48	Bernard Reforsado	
4	"Mas Mabuti Pa"	Janine Berdin	Mhonver Lopez & Joanna Concepcion	4th Best Song; Star Music Choice Award
5	"Hati Na Lang Tayo Sa Kanya"	Eumee	Joseph Santiago	
6	"Sugarol"	Maris Racal	Jan Sabili	MOR 101.9 Choice; TFC's Global Choice; MYX Best Music Video
7	"Sa Mga Bituin Na Lang Ibubulong"	JM de Guzman	Kyle Raphael Borbon	Winner
8	"Wakasan"	Agsunta	Philip Arvin Jarilla	2nd Best Song
9	"Para Sa Tabi"	BoybandPH	Robert William Pereña	
10	"Kababata"	Kyla & Kritiko	John Michael Edixon	3rd Best Song

== 2019 ==
#	Song	Artist	Composer(s)	Notes
1	"Ingat"	I Belong to the Zoo	Ferdinand Aragon	
2	"Nung Tayo Pa"	Janella Salvador	Rex Torremoro & Elmar Jan Bolaño	4th Best Song
3	"Sasabihin Ko"	Joan Da	LJ Manzano & Joan Da	
4	"Please Lang"	Alex Gonzaga feat. Toni Gonzaga	Michael Angelo "Aikee" Aplacador	3rd Best Song
5	"Ikaw at Linggo"	Eamarie	Eamarie Gilayo	
6	"Simula ng Dulo"	Davey Langit	Davey Langit & Therese Marie Villarante	2nd Best Song
7	"Sa'yong Mundo"	Janine Berdin	Noel Zuniga Cabalquinto	
8	"Isa Pang Ikaw"	Justin Vasquez	Joseph Ponce	
9	"Alaala"	Alekzandra	Alekzandra Nicole Quitalig	
10	"Panandalian"	TJ Monterde	Jerome C. Arcangel & Cee Jay D. Del Rosario	5th Best Song
11	"Paano Ba"	Vanya Castor	Richanne Charms Jacinto	
12	"Mabagal"	Daniel Padilla & Moira Dela Torre	Dan Martel Simon Tañedo	Winner; Listeners' Choice; MOR 101.9 Choice; One Music PH Favorite Interpreter; MYX Best Music Video; Best Produced Track

== 2020 ==
#	Song	Artist	Composer(s)	Notes
1	"Ang Hirap Maging Mahirap"	Davey Langit feat. Kritiko	Kenneth Reodica	4th Best Song
2	"Ika'y Babalik Pa Ba"	Juris	Jabez Orara	
3	"Ibang Planeta"	Zild	Dan Tañedo	3rd Best Song
4	"Kulang Ang Mundo"	Sam Mangubat	Daryl Cielo	5th Best Song
5	"Out"	Fana	Erica Sabalboro	
6	"Bulalakaw"	Janine Berdin feat. Joanna Ang	Joanna Ang	
7	"Tinadhana Sa'yo"	Zephanie	SJ Gandia	MOR's Choice Award; TFC's Global Choice Award
8	"Pahina"	Kiss N' Tell	Joshua Ortiz & Aniceto Cabahug III	
9	"Kahit Kunwari Man Lang"	Moira Dela Torre & Agsunta	Kirt David Mercado	Most Streamed Song
10	"Kahit Na Masungit"	Jeremy Glinoga & Kyle Echarri	John Francis & Jayson Franz Pasicolan	2nd Best Song
11	"Tabi Tabi Po"	JMKO	Mariah Alyssa Moriones	TikTok's Choice Award
12	"Marupok"	KZ Tandingan	Daniella Ann Balagtas	Winner; MYX Choice for Best Music Video

== 2025 ==
#	Song	Artist	Composer(s)	Notes
1	"MHWG"	VXON	Rob Angeles	
2	"Tulala"	Shantel Cyline & Extrapolation	Shantel Cyline Lapatha	
3	"Dili Nalang"	Jollianne	Relden Campanilla	
4	"Kurba"	Maki	Alvin Serito	Smart People's Choice Award; MYX Best Music Video
5	"Langit Lupa"	Lyka Estrella, Annrain & Geca Morales	Geca Morales	
6	"Papahiram"	Moira Dela Torre & Johnoy Danao	Rinz Ruiz	Second Runner-up
7	"Taliwala"	Noah Alejandre	Maric Gavino	
8	"ATM"	Ice Seguerra	Francis Contemplacion	
9	"Ghostwriter"	Khimo Gumatay	Kevin Yadao	
10	"Wag Paglaruan"	Fana feat. Tiara Shaye	Tiara Shaye	Winner
11	"Buhi"	Ferdinand Aragon	Keith John Quito	First Runner-up
12	"Salamat (Nga Wala Na Ta)"	Kurt Fick	Jimmy Ricks Grajo	
