= 24th Awit Awards =

2011 Philippine music awards ceremony

- Date: December 12, 2011
- Location: Music Museum, Greenhills, San Juan
- Hosted by: Billy Crawford; Nikki Gil

Highlights
- Most awards: Parokya ni Edgar (4)
- Most nominations: Jonathan Manalo (8)
- Album of the Year: Juris, Now Playing by Juris
- Song of the Year: "Pakiusap Lang (Lasingin Nyo Ako)" by Chito Miranda

Television/radio coverage
- Produced by: ALV Events International
- Directed by: Freddie Santos

The 24th Awit Awards were held on December 12, 2011 at the Music Museum located in Greenhills, San Juan. They honored achievements in the Philippine music industry for the year 2010.

Jonathan Manalo was able to receive the most number of nominations with eight. Juris and Aiza Seguerra followed with five.

The ceremony was hosted by couple, Billy Crawford & Nikki Gil. Parokya ni Edgar along with Chito Miranda, its lead vocalist, won the most awards with four, including Song of the Year. PARI also gave a plaque of recognition to Ronnie Ricketts, the Optical Media Board chairman, for his campaign against piracy.

== Winners and nominees ==
Winners are listed first and highlighted in bold. Nominated producers, composers and lyricists are not included in this list, unless noted. For the full list, please go to their official website.

=== Performance Awards ===
Best Performance by a Female Recording Artist	Best Performance by a Male Recording Artist
**"Mahal Kita (Di Mo Pansin)" – Kyla**; "Ain't a Crime" – Amber Davis; "'Di Lang Ikaw" – Juris; "Your Song" – Lea Salonga; "You Don't Know" – Regine Velasquez	**"Someday" – Nyoy Volante**; "Huling Araw" – DJ Myke; "Handog" – Dolphy; "Did It Ever" – Gary Valenciano; "Kung Tayo'y Magkakalayo" – Gary Valenciano
Best Performance by a Group Recording Artists	Best Performance by a New Female Recording Artist
**"Pakiusap Lang (Lasingin Nyo Ako)" – Parokya ni Edgar**; "Ang Huling Yakap ng Mundo" – Imago; "Baliw" – Kiss Jane; "Picture Picture" – Tanya Markova; "'Yun Lang" – True Faith	**"This Moment" – Lara Cuevas**; "Today I'll See the Sun" – Frencheska Farr; "Anima Christi" – Liezel Garcia; "Kalikasan" – Justine Legaspi; "Solo" – Yssa
Best Performance by a New Male Recording Artist	Best Performance by a New Group Recording Artists
**"Faithfully" – Jovit Baldivino**; "Carrie" – Jovit Baldivino; "Huling Araw" – DJ Myke; "Panaginip" – Marvin Ong; "Back to Love" – Quest	**"Walang Iba" – Ezra Band**; "Red Heaven" – General Luna; "Baliw" – Kiss Jane; "Para Sa'yo" – RPM; "Picture Picture" – Tanya Markova
Best Collaboration
**"Pangarap Lang Kita" – Parokya ni Edgar feat. Happee Sy**; "Star ng Pasko" – Carol Banawa, Yeng Constantino, Juris & Aiza Seguerra; "The Love Song" – Davey & Raffi; "Muli" – Jay R & Nina; "Sari-saring Kwento" – Champ Lui Pio feat. Noel Cabangon & Gloc-9

=== Creativity Awards ===
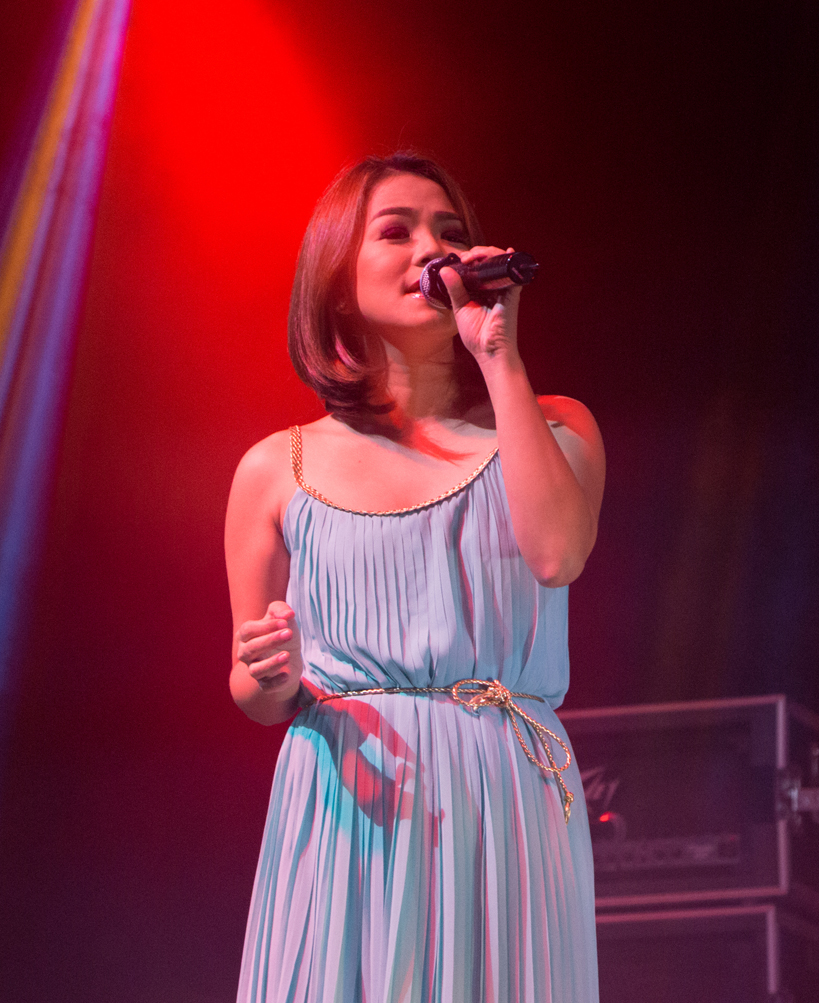
Juris, Album of the Year winner

Album of the Year	Song of the Year
**Juris, Now Playing – Juris**; Ngayon at Kailanman: A Tribute to George Canseco – Ogie Alcasid; Jay R Sings OPM Love Classics – Jay R; Fantasy – Regine Velasquez	**"Pakiusap Lang (Lasingin Nyo Ako)"** **Chito Miranda (composer & lyricist)**; "'Di Lang Ikaw" Juris & Aiza Seguerra (composers) Juris (lyricist); "Falling in Love" Rey Cantong (composer & lyricist); "I'll Be the One" Christian Martinez (composer & lyricist); "Kaya Mo" Jonathan Manalo (composer & lyricist)
Best Selling Album of the Year	Best Ballad Recording
**Faithfully – Jovit Baldivino**	**"Pangarap Lang Kita" – Parokya ni Edgar**; "Muli" – Dingdong Avanzado; "Isama Mo Ako" – Frencheska Farr; "'Di Lang Ikaw" – Juris; "Kung Tayo' Magkakalayo" – Gary Valenciano
Best Rock/Alternative Recording	Best World Music Recording
**"Higante" – Ely Buendia & Francis M**; "Ang Huling Yakap ng Mundo" – Imago; "Baliw" – Kiss Jane; "Hanging Habagat" – Champ Lui Pio; "Lakad" – Sandwich	**"Panatang Makabayani" – Jingle Buena**; "Hitik sa Bunga" – Brownman Revival
Best Novelty Recording	Best Dance Recording
**"Shawarma" – Shivaker**; "Ayaw sa Akin" – Bayani Agbayani; "Jejemon" – Blanktape; "Kung Sexy Lang Ako" – Fat Session; "Mr. Papabol" – Vhong Navarro	**"Move" – Gabriel Valenciano feat. Kiana Valenciano**; "All Me" – Toni Gonzaga; "Don't Tie Me Down" – Kyla; "Shawarma" – Shivaker; "Radio Revolution" – Quest
Best Inspirational/Religious Recording	Best Christmas Recording
**"Sa'yo Lamang" – Jamie Rivera & Hail Mary the Queen Children's Choir**; "Kaya Mo" – Protein Shake feat. Kean Cipriano & Ney Dimaculangan; "May Pag-asa Pa" – Reuben Laurente; "Lead Me Lord" – Aiza Seguerra; "Mountain Wind" – True Faith	**"Ilang Tulog pa Ba?" – Ateneo Chamber Singers**; "Silent Night na Naman" – Bayani Agbayani; "Nakaraang Pasko" – Christian Bautista; "Ngayong Pasko Magniningning ang Pilipino" – Toni Gonzaga & Gary Valenciano feat. University of Santo Tomas Singers; "Christmas (A Time to Love)" – Erik Santos
Best Rap Recording	Best R&B Recording
**"Jejemon" – Blanktape**; "Shawarma" – Shivaker	**"Easy Ka Lang" – DJ Myke**; "You Make Me Feel" – Toni Gonzaga; "Mahal Kita (Di Mo Pansin)" – Kyla; "Back to Love" – Quest
Best Song Written for Movie/TV/Stage Play
**"Kaya Mo" (from RPG Metanoia) – Protein Shake feat. Kean Cipriano & Ney Dimaculangan**; "Muli" (from Muli) – Dingdong Avanzado; "Walang Hanggan" (from Imortal) – Yeng Constantino & Ney Dimaculangan

=== Technical Achievement Awards ===
Best Musical Arrangement	Best Vocal Arrangement
**"Kung Wala Ka" – Bobby Velasco**; "To Be with You" – Mon Faustino; "Kung Tayo'y Magkakalayo" – Gerard Salonga; "Handog" – Mel Villena; "Panalangin" – Mel Villena	**"Mahal Kita (Di Mo Pansin)" – Francis Louis Salazar**; "Easy Ka Lang" – DJ Myke; "The Last Time I Felt Like This" – Ferdie Marquez; "Last Christmas" – Ito Rapadas; "Kung Wala Ka" – Bobby Velasco
Best Engineered Recording	Best Album Package
**"You Don't Know" – Willy Villa**; "Kung Wala Ka" – Nikki Cunanan; "Red Heaven" – Angee Rozul; "Kung Tayo'y Magkakalayo" – Gerard Salonga; "I Believe" – Willy Villa	**Bryan Begin** **Norman Ramos, Bryan Termulo & Ronnie Tres Reyes (graphic design & album concept)** **Jeanne Young (photography)**; Handog ni Pidol (A Lifetime of Music and Laughter) Willie Monzon (graphic design & album concept) Raymund Isaac (photography); KC Grace Torres (graphic design) Mario Joson (album concept) Mark Nicdao (photography); Nina Diamond: Greatest Hits Joseph de Vera (graphic design) Anne Poblador (album concept) Various Artists (photography); Vina Morales: Awit ng Ating Buhay Patrick Kevin Cabrera IV (graphic design) Patrick Kevin Cabrera IV & Rox Santos (album concept) Marlon Pecjo (photography)
Music Video of the Year
**"Kalayaan" – Bamboo** **Pancho Esguerra (director)**; "Kaya Mo" – Protein Shake feat. Kean Cipriano & Ney Dimaculangan Treb Monteras II (director); "Suplado Ka Pala sa Personal" – Itchyworms Galileo Te (director); "Lakad" – Sandwich Jayson Magbanua (director); "Disney" – Tanya Markova King Palisoc (director)

=== Digital Awards ===
ABS-CBN Interactive's Most Downloaded Song for 2010	ABS-CBN Interactive's Most Downloaded Artist for 2010
**"Muli" – Freddie Saturno & Vehnee Saturno**^{[A]}	**Christian Bautista**
EGG's AllHits.ph Most Downloaded Song for 2010	EGG's AllHits.ph Most Downloaded Artist for 2010
**"Careless Whisper" – Kris Lawrence**	**Kris Lawrence**
I-Gateway Mobile Philippines Inc.'s Most Downloaded Song for 2010	I-Gateway Mobile Philippines Inc.'s Most Downloaded Artist for 2010
**"Ang Huling El Bimbo" – Ely Buendia^{[A]}**	**Sabrina**

Note:

^[A]The awards were given specifically to the composers, instead of the recording artists/groups.

=== Special awards ===
International Achievement Award
Recipients	Achievements
Anna Fegi	Artists championing the world of cruise entertainment.
**Reuben Laurente**	Artists championing the world of cruise entertainment.
Christian Bautista	Stars in the Singaporean musical series, The Kitchen Musical.
**Karylle**	Stars in the Singaporean musical series, The Kitchen Musical.
Sabrina	Her albums, I Love Acoustic, I Love Acoustic Too and I Love Acoustic 3 went to platinum and gold statuses in Thailand and Indonesia.
Rose Marielle Mamaclay	The 2010 Senior Grand Champion Performer of the World in the World Championships of Performing Arts.
Lordenn Panganiban	Panganiban won the gold prize while the song, "Within", won the best song, which she sang in the 11th Asia New Singer Competition in Beijing. It was composed by Vehnee Saturno and written by Popsie Saturno-San Pedro.
**Vehnee Saturno**	Panganiban won the gold prize while the song, "Within", won the best song, which she sang in the 11th Asia New Singer Competition in Beijing. It was composed by Vehnee Saturno and written by Popsie Saturno-San Pedro.
**Popsie Saturno-San Pedro**	Panganiban won the gold prize while the song, "Within", won the best song, which she sang in the 11th Asia New Singer Competition in Beijing. It was composed by Vehnee Saturno and written by Popsie Saturno-San Pedro.
Vincent Bueno	Won the Musical! Die Show in 2008 in Austria.
Margaret Ortega	Won the Star Factor 2010 in Hong Kong.

Plaque of Recognition	Dangal ng Musikang Pilipino Award
**Ronnie Ricketts**	**Ramon "RJ" Jacinto**

== Performers ==
This is in order of appearance.

Artist(s)	Song(s)
Billy Crawford; Nikki Gil	"Magsasaya" (6cyclemind cover)
Jammistas	Rocketeer (Far East Movement & Ryan Tedder cover); That Should Be Me (Justin Bieber cover); Who Says (Selena Gomez & the Scene cover); Marry Me (Train cover); The Lazy Song (Bruno Mars cover)
Zia Quizon	"Ako na Lang"
Gabriel Valenciano	"Move"
Robin Nievera	
Christian Bautista; Karylle	"Please Be Careful with My Heart" (Jose Mari Chan & Regine Velasquez cover)
Isabella Gonzalez; Kuh Ledesma	"Anak" (Freddie Aguilar cover)
Jay R	"Ikaw Lamang" (Zsa Zsa Padilla cover)
Kris Lawrence	"Moments of Love"
Kyla	"Mahal Kita (Di Mo Pansin)"
Juris; Nyoy Volante	
Gloc-9; Parokya ni Edgar	
