= Philippine Popular Music Festival =

Annual songwriting competition

The Philippine Popular Music Festival (also known as Philpop) is an annual songwriting competition organized by the Philpop MusicFest Foundation and was launched in 2012. The creation of the festival was inspired by the defunct Metro Manila Popular Music Festival. The foundation itself is headed by the chairman Manny V. Pangilinan, executive director Ryan Cayabyab and administrator and communications director Patricia Bermudez-Hizon. The competition is only open to original and previously unreleased songs in English, Filipino and other Philippine languages. Since its inception, it has been airing annually in TV5.

There are three prizes given: Grand Prize (₱1,000,000), 2nd Prize (₱500,000) and 3rd Prize (₱250,000). An additional award is given named Smart People's Choice Award (₱200,000), which is the most popular song based on the text votes sent by the people. People who win these prizes also receive trophies while the defeated finalists each receive ₱50,000 and a plaque.

In its first year, the festival has received many controversies regarding to its finalists and its rules. On its second year, all the interpreters were able to film music videos for their respective song entries.

Viva Records released the compilation albums of the PhilPop Music Festival finalists.

In 2020, the Philpop Foundation formed a partnership with Warner Music Philippines and telecommunications company Smart Communications for its 2020 Edition of the competition.

== 1st Philippine Popular Music Festival (2012) ==
- Date: July 14, 2012
- Venue: Philippine International Convention Center, Pasay
- Hosts: Ogie Alcasid and Nikki Gil

Result	Song	Composer/s	Interpreter/s	Special Awards
—	"3 AM"	Keiko Necesario	Marié Digby	—
Grand Winner	"Bawat Hakbang" (Every Step)	Karl Villuga	Mark Bautista & Akafellas	—
—	"Bigtime"	Trina Belamide	Baihana	—
—	"Brown"	James Leyte	Brownman Revival & James Leyte	Smart People's Choice Award
—	"Dulo ng Dila" (End of the Tongue)	Noah Zuñiga	Jay R & Deejay Poblete	—
—	"Himig ng Panahon" (Melody of Generation)	Thyro Alfaro	Duncan Ramos, Luke Mejares, Loonie, Thyro & Yumi	—
—	"Kesa"	Edwin Marollano	Daniel Grospe	—
2nd Runner-up	"Kontrabida" (Villain)	Soc Villanueva	Sam Concepcion	—
—	"Minsa'y Isang Bansa" (Sometimes One Country)	Gary Granada	Gary Granada	—
—	"Negastar"	Mike Villegas	Cathy Go	—
—	"Piso" (Peso)	Kristofferson Melecio	Joey Ayala	—
—	"Slowdancing"	Kennard Faraon	Nyoy Volante	—
—	"Takusa"	Byron Ricamara	Rocksteddy	—
1st Runner-up	"Tayo-tayo Lang" (Only Between Us)	Toto Sorioso	Ebe Dancel	—

== 2nd Philippine Popular Music Festival (2013) ==
- Date: July 20, 2013
- Venue: Meralco Theater, Pasig
- Hosts: Ogie Alcasid and Jasmine Curtis

Result	Song	Composer/s	Interpreter/s	Special Award/s
—	"Araw, Ulap, Langit" (Sun, Clouds, Heaven)	Marlon Barnuevo	Christian Bautista	—
—	"Askal"	Ganny Brown	Jose Manalo & Wally Bayola	—
Grand Winner	"Dati" (Ever Since)	Thyro Alfaro & Yumi Lacsamana	Sam Concepcion & Tippy Dos Santos feat. Quest	—
1st Runner-up	"Kung 'Di Man" (If It's Not)	Johnoy Danao	Ney Dimaculangan	Smart People's Choice Award
2nd Runner-up	"Pansamantagal"	Jungee Marcelo	Sitti & Julianne Tarroja	—
—	"Papel" (Paper)	Joey Ayala	Joey Ayala & Gloc-9 feat. Denise Barbacena	—
—	"Sana Pinatay Mo Na Lang Ako" (How I Wish You Just Killed Me)	Myrus Apacible	Kimpoy Feliciano	—
—	"Sa'yo Na Lang Ako" (Let Me Be Yours)	Lara Maigue	Karylle	—
—	"Segundo" (Second)	Paul Armesin	Yael Yuzon	Meralco Special Award
—	"Sometimes That Happens"	Adrienne Buenaventura & Niño Regalado	Ace Libre	—
—	"Space"	Raffy Calicdan	Kean Cipriano & Banda ni Kleggy	—
—	"Time Machine" ^{1}	Kennard Faraon	Six Part Invention	—

Note:

^1 This song replaced Marion Aunor's entry, "Do, Do, Do", after Aunor backed out for personal reasons and her talent management decision.

== 3rd Philippine Popular Music Festival (2014) ==
- Date: July 26, 2014
- Venue: Meralco Theater, Pasig
- Hosts: Ogie Alcasid, Christian Bautista, Iya Villania, Jasmine Curtis and Tim Yap
- Judges: Abra, Aiza Seguerra, Julie Anne San Jose, Megan Young, Sam Concepcion, Wilma Galvante and Noel Cabangon

Result	Song	Composer/s	Interpreter/s	Special Award
1st Runner-up	"Awit Mo'y Nandito Pa" (Your Song's Still There)	Toto Sorioso	Aldrich Talonding & James Bucong	—
—	"Babalikan Mo Rin Ako" (You Will Return to Me)	Soc Villanueva	Nikki Gil	—
—	"Dear Heart"	Mike Villegas	Kiana Valenciano	—
—	"Hangout Lang" (Hangout Only)	Allan Feliciano & Isaac Garcia	Duncan Ramos & Young JV	—
—	"Kung Akin Lang Ang Langit" (If Heaven Is Only Mine)	Cecilia Bocobo & Isaac Garcia	Mcoy Fundales & Clara Benin	Spinnr People's Choice Award
—	"Langit Umaawit" (Heaven Sings)	Toto Sorioso	Tom Rodriguez	—
—	"NGSB (No Girlfriend Since Break)"	Davey Langit	Luigi D' Avola	—
—	"Qrush On You"	Flava Matikz & Knowa Lazarus	Jay R, Elmo Magalona & Q-York	—
Grand Winner	"Salbabida" (Life Saver)	Jungee Marcelo	Kyla	—
—	"Song On A Broken String"	Jude Gitamondoc & Therese Villarante	Nicole Laurel Asensio	—
—	"The Only One"	Venelyn San Pedro	Thor Dulay	—
2nd Runner-up	"Torpe Song"	Daryl Ong	Kris Lawrence	—

== 4th Philippine Popular Music Festival (2015) ==
- Date: July 25, 2015
- Venue: Meralco Theater
- Hosts: Mark Bautista, Sam Pinto-Semerad and Bela Padilla
- Judges: Randy Estrellado, Paolo Valenciano, Quest, Karylle, Kris Lawrence, Louie Ocampo and Jett Pangan

Result	Song	Composer/s	Interpreter/s	Special Award/s
—	"Walang Hanggan" (Forever)	Ramiru Mataro	Ramiru Mataro & Donnalyn Bartolome	—
—	"Musikaw" (Music and You)	Melchor Magno	James Reid feat. Pio	—
—	"I Owe You My Heart"	MJ Morallos	Anja Aguilar	—
Grand Winner	"Triangulo" (Triangle)	Thyro Alfaro & Yumi Lacsamana	Thyro Alfaro, Yumi Lacsamana & Jeric Medina	—
—	"For The Rest Of My Life"	Ned Esguerra	Side A	—
2nd Runner-up	"Sa Ibang Mundo" (In Another World)	Mark Villar	Kean Cipriano & Nadine Lustre	Maynilad People's Choice Award
—	"Kilig"	Soc Villanueva	Jinky Vidal	—
—	"Apat Na Buwang Pasko" (Four-Month Christmas)	Gino Cruz & Jeff Arcilla	Jon Santos	—
1st Runner-up	"Paratingin Mo Na Siya"	Davey Langit	Davey Langit	—
—	"Nasaan"	Lara Maigue	Lara Maigue	—
—	"Tanging Pag-asa Ko" (My Only Hope)	Paul Armesin	The Company	—
—	"Edge Of The World"	Johannes Garcia	Josh Padilla & Yassi Pressman	Best Music Video Award

== 5th Philippine Popular Music Festival (2016) ==
Out of more than 2,000 entries, The Philpop, together with the adjudicators — singers Basti Artadi, Bullet Dumas, Ebe Dancel, Lara Maigue and Davey Langit, academe members and college students — selects 12 entries for the competition. Five of the composers are returning to the competition, while 11 of those are rookies.

- Date: July 23, 2016
- Venue: Kia Theatre, Araneta Center, Quezon City
- Judges: Adam Hurstfield, Christian Walden, Marcus Davis, Jr.
- Hosts: Sam YG, Slick Rick, Toni Tony, and Bela Padilla

Result	Song	Composer/s	Interpreter/s	Special Award/s
—	"Baliw sa Ex-Boyfriend Ko" (I'm Crazy for My Ex-Boyfriend)	Joan Da	Sugar 'N Spice featuring Joan Da	—
—	"Binibini sa MRT"	Johann Garcia	The Juans	—
Grand Winner	"Di Na Muli"	Jazz Nicolas and Wally Acolola	Itchyworms	—
—	"Dumadagundong"	Brian Cua and Mike Villegas	Yassi Pressman	—
—	"Friday Night"	Karl Guarano	Kenjhons	—
—	"Kahon" (Box)	Ramiro Mataru	Ramiru Mataro	—
1st Runner-up	"Lahat" (Everything)	Soc Villanueva	Jason Dy	Maynilad People's Choice Award
—	"Nobody But You"	Keiko Necesario	Monica Cuenco	—
—	"Pabili Po"	Aikee Aplacador	Banda ni Kleggy and Aikee	—
—	"Stars are Aligned"	JC Jose	Acapellago and Jimmy Marquez	—
—	"Sintunado" (Out of Tune)	Jeroel Maranan	Nyoy Volante	—
2nd Runner-up	"Tinatangi" (Special)	Miguel Guico and Paolo Guico	Cookie Chua, Bayang Barrios and The Benjamins	Smart/PLDT Best Music Video Award

== 6th Philippine Popular Music Festival (2018) ==
The 30 semifinalists for the 2018 Philippine Popular Music Festival were announced on July 24, 2018. A criteria of 25% online streams, 25% SMS voting, and 50% judges' choices was used to select the top 10 finalists. The Top 10 were announced on October 17, 2018. The Grand Finals were held on December 2, 2018.

=== Top 30 ===
- Date: October 17, 2018
- Venue: BGC Arts Center, Bonifacio Global City, Taguig

Results	Song	Composer/s	Composer/s Location	Interpreter/s
—	"AEIOU"	Kenneth John Pores	General Trias, Cavite	Davey Langit
Top 10	"Ako Ako" (Me, Me)	Jeriko Buenafe	Taguig City	Feel Day, Hans Dimayga
—	"Away Wa'y Buwagay"	Eamarie Gilayo & Jovit Leonerio	Davao City, Davao del Sur	Winset Jacot, Medyo Maldito
—	"Bumbero" (Fireman)	Michael Llave	Quezon City	Mic Llave
Top 10	"'Di Ko Man"	Ferdinand Aragon	Cebu City, Cebu	Ferdinand Aragon
—	"Ikaw Ang Aking Pag-Ibig" (You Are My Love)	Mark Jay Felipe	Guimba, Nueva Ecija	RJ Dela Fuente
Top 10	"Isang Gabing Pag-Ibig" (One Night Stand)	Carlo Angelo David	Quezon City	Jex De Castro
Top 10	"Kariton" (Cart)	Philip Arvin Jarilla	Antipolo, Rizal	Acapellago
—	"Kelan Kaya" (When)	Sarah Bulahan	Mandaluyong	Ataska, Nash Lorca
—	"kilabl"	Karlo Zabala	Valenzuela City	Carlyn Ocampo, Joshua Feliciano
—	"Korde Kodigo"	Jeremy Sarmiento	Davao City, Davao del Sur	Leanne & Naara
Top 10	"Laon Ako" (I'm Old)	Elmar Jan Bolaño & Donel Trasporto	Tigbuan, Iloilo	Kakai Bautista
—	"LDR (Layong 'Di Ramdam)"	Russ Narcies "Nar" Cabico	Quezon City	Nar Cabico
—	"LGBT (Laging Ganito Ba Tayo?)"	Kyle Pulido	Davao City, Davao del Sur	Kyle Pulido
—	"Lilipad" (Flies)	Agatha Morallos & Joseph Morallos	Baguio, Benguet	Bayang Barrios, Naliyagan Band
Top 10	"Loco De Amor!"	Edgardo Miraflor Jr.	Bacolod, Negros Occidental	BennyBunnyBand
—	"Mahirap Magselos"	Paul Hildawa	Makati	Caleb Santos
—	"Makisabay" (Go Along)	Carlo Angelo David	Quezon City	Carlo David
—	"Malilimutan Din Kita" (I Will Forget You Too)	Marvin Blue Corpuz	Koronadal, South Cotabato	Nitro
—	"MMRA"	Oliver Narag	Valenzuela City	Jeric Medina
Top 10	"Nanay Tatay" (Mother Father)	Teodoro Festejo III	Davao City, Davao del Sur	Chud Festejo
—	"Oka"	Michael Angelo "Aikee" Aplacador	Pateros	Thyro Alfaro, Aikee
—	"Perfect Imperfect Human"	Barry Villacarillo	Lapu-Lapu City, Cebu	Jem Cubil
Top 10	"Pilipit"	Sean Gabriel Cedro & John Ray Reodique	Antipolo, Rizal	Julian Trono
—	"Promise Sorry Note"	Michael Angelo "Aikee" Aplacador	Pateros	Yumi Lacsamana
—	"Pwede" (Possible)	Agatha Morallos & Melvin Joseph Morallos	Baguio, Benguet	The Juans
Top 10	"Tama Na" (Stop)	Michael Rodriguez & Jeanne Columbine Rodriguez	Makati	Katrina Velarde
—	"Unang Adlaw Nga Wala Ka" (English: First Day Without You/Tagalog: Unang Araw Na Wala Ka)	Therese Marie Villarante & Henrick James Pestaño	Talisay City, Cebu	Therese Villarante
—	"Utang" (Debt)	Ignacio Dennis Roxas	Malolos City, Bulacan	Kuya Dennis
Top 10	"Yun Tayo"	Donnalyn Onilongo	Angono, Rizal	Gracenote

=== Top 10 ===
- Date: December 2, 2018
- Venue: Capitol Commons
- Judges: Ryan Cayabyab, Verb Del Rosario, Trina Belamide, Liza Diño-Seguerra, Randy Estrellado, Noel Cabangon, Paolo Guico

Results	Song	Composer/s	Composer/s Location	Interpreter/s	Special Award/s
2nd Runner-up	"Ako Ako" (Me, Me)	Jeriko Buenafe	Taguig City	Feel Day, Hans Dimayga	—
1st Runner-up	"'Di Ko Man"	Ferdinand Aragon	Cebu City, Cebu	Ferdinand Aragon	—
—	"Isang Gabing Pag-Ibig" (One Night Stand)	Carlo Angelo David	Quezon City	Jex De Castro	—
—	"Kariton" (Cart)	Philip Arvin Jarilla	Antipolo, Rizal	Acapellago	—
—	"Laon Ako" (I'm Old)	Elmar Jan Bolaño & Donel Trasporto	Tigbuan, Iloilo	Kakai Bautista	—
—	"Loco De Amor!"	Edgardo Miraflor Jr.	Bacolod, Negros Occidental	BennyBunnyBand	—
Grand Winner	"Nanay Tatay" (Mother Father)	Teodoro Festejo III	Davao City, Davao del Sur	Chud Festejo	Maynilad Best Music Video
—	"Pilipit"	Sean Gabriel Cedro & John Ray Reodique	Antipolo, Rizal	Julian Trono	—
—	"Tama Na" (Stop)	Michael Rodriguez & Jeanne Columbine Rodriguez	Makati	Katrina Velarde	—
—	"Yun Tayo"	Donnalyn Onilongo	Angono, Rizal	Gracenote (band)	Smart People's Choice Award

== 7th Philippine Popular Music Festival (2020) ==
The 2020 edition of PhilPop songwriting competition was announced in July 2020. Due to the restrictions on the COVID-19 pandemic affecting the music industry and the prohibition of live events, the competition was held online.

The top 15 entries were announced in September 2020, while the Grand Finals was held on December 12 via livestreaming on PhilPop's social media accounts.

Results	Song	Composer/s	Composer/s Location	Interpreter/s	Special Award/s
—	"Agsardeng"	Abegail Esteban and TJ Paeldon	North Luzon	Ms. Ramonne	—
—	"Akong Bililhon"	John Cadeliña	Mindanao	The Marshland	—
—	“Ayaw Na Lang”	Jerika Teodorico	Visayas	Lourdes Maglinte	—
—	"Balikan"	Lolito Go	North Luzon	Benj Manalo	Smart People's Choice
First Runner-Up	"Bestiny"	Aikee	Metro Manila	Kevin Yadao, Jr. Crown	—
—	"Bitaw"	Princess Roselle Germina	South Luzon	Zsaris	—
—	"Hinungdan"	Michael Catarina	Visayas	James Gulles	—
—	“Huling Sayaw”	Kian Dionisio	Metro Manila	Nyoy Volante	Smart People's Choice
—	“Kasadya”	Christian Chiu	Mindanao	Jay-ar Vaño feat. XT on Sax	Smart People's Choice
—	"Lunod"	Chochay Magno	South Luzon	Shaira Opsimar	—
—	“Mapa”	Aikee	Metro Manila	Chloe Redondo feat. Aikee	—
—	“Paos”	Angelic Mateo	North Luzon	Keiko Necesario	—
—	“Para Kay Catriona”	Kulas Basilonia	South Luzon	I Belong To The Zoo	Smart People's Choice
Second Runner-up	“Pahuway”	Sherwin Fugoso	Mindanao	Ferdinand Aragon	
Grand Winner	“Suyo”	Noah Alejandre and Reanne Borela	Visayas	Noah Alejandre and Reanne Borela	Smart People's Choice

== 8th Philippine Popular Music Festival: PhilPop Himig Handog Songwriting Festival (2022-2025) ==
In September 2022, PhilPop and Himig Handog, renowned entities in the Philippine music industry, collaborated for the biggest songwriting festival in the Philippines. This collaboration followed an open audition where songwriters could submit their released or unreleased songs.

On April 14, 2023, PhilPop and Himig Handog announced the selection of 35 DigiCamp fellows who would take part in the Songwriting Festival. These selected 35 Fellows engaged in a 2-month DigiCamp program tailored to enrich their songwriting skills. The DigiCamp curriculum included a well-structured program providing training, guidance, and mentorship to foster the development of their capabilities as songwriters. After the 2-month training, the 35 fellows had to submit their final entries to qualify for the top 12.

On July 22, 2023, PhilPop and Himig Handog, revealed the top 12 selected Grand Finalists who had qualified to progress to the forthcoming competition. The top 12 entries went through multiple rounds of adjudication, headed by an esteemed panel of Board Members, producers, key leaders, prominent songwriters, and decision-makers affiliated with PhilPop and Himig Handog.

One year after the announcement of the Top 12, on July 17, 2024, a video uploaded by Star Music PH and Philpop unveiled the names of the interpreters and their respective songs, alongside the composers. The following day, July 18, 2024, marked the highly anticipated grand media launch of Philpop Himig Handog 2024. This event was attended by the interpreters and the top 12 composers, including notable figures like Ice Seguerra, Moira Dela Torre, Johnoy Danao, Maki, VXON, Khimo Gumatay and several emerging artists from the Philippines.

The top 12 Philpop Himig Handog songs were released on all digital platforms on July 19, 2024. The Official music videos were released on November 8, 2024, on the ABS-CBN Star Music YouTube channel. The Grand Finals were held on March 22, 2025.

Number	Song	Composer	Composer's Location	Interpreter/s	Music Video Director / Production Team	Result
1	"MHWG" (Mahiwaga)	Rob Angeles	Rizal	VXON	Kent Limbaga, KNT Production	
2	"Tulala"	Shantel Cyline Lapatha	Bacolod	Shantel Cyline, Extrapolation	Marben Portucela	
3	"Dili Nalang"	Relden Campanilla	Cebu	Jollianne	Andrei Torres	
4	"Kurba"	Alvin Serito	Metro Manila	Maki	Raf Evangelista, Chapters PH	Smart People's Choice Award MYX Choice for Best Music Video Award
5	"Langit Lupa"	Geca Morales	Metro Manila	Lyka Estrella, Annrain, Geca Morales	Mark Putian, Wonderlast Production	
6	"Papahiram"	Rinz Ruiz	Bulacan	Moira Dela Torre, Johnoy Danao	Benedict Mariategue, Equinox Manila Productions	Second Runner-up
7	"Taliwala"	Maric Gavino	Davao City	Noah Alejandre	Juliana Santos, Inside Job Studios	
8	"ATM" (Ang Tanging Mamahalin)	Francis Contemplacion	Laguna	Ice Seguerra	Oslec Andres	
9	"Ghostwriter"	Kevin Yadao	Metro Manila	Khimo Gumatay	Riel Mandapat, January Skies Creations	
10	"Wag Paglaruan"	Tiara Shaye	Metro Manila	Fana ft. Tiara Shaye	Ingrid Ignacio, Wonderlast Production	Grand Winner
11	"Buhi"	Keith John Quito	Bohol	Ferdinand Aragon	Raymark King Bingcang, Alasingko Media	First Runner-Up
12	"Salamat (Nga Wala Na Ta)"	Jimmy Ricks Grajo	Cebu	Kurt Fick	Karla Carmina Castañeda	

Special Awards:

- Smart People's Choice Awards
- TBA

== See also ==
- Original Pilipino Music
- Himig Handog
