= If You and Me =

If You And Me (쥬리스)

EP by Juris
- Released: November 12, 2010
- Genre: Pop, Adult Contemporary, OPM
- Language: English
- Label: Limelight Productions, OGAM Entertainment (South Korea); Star Recording, Inc. (Philippines)
- Producer: Kin Hyun Bo

Juris chronology
Now Playing (2010)	If You And Me (쥬리스) (2010)	Forevermore (2011)

Alternative covers
- Star Records digital album cover

If You And Me (쥬리스) is the first EP album by Filipino singer Juris, released on November 12, 2010, in South Korea in CD format and digital download. It is also released in the Philippines in digital download by Star Records.

== Background ==
The mini-album If You And Me consists only of 6 tracks including 2 English cover of Korean songs: "If" by Taeyeon of Girls' Generation and "Don't Forget" by Baek Ji-young. Also includes her cover of Tamia's "Officially Missing You" and "Opposites Attracts" composed by Junjee Marcelo which is also included in her first studio album Now Playing. The songs in the album were all recorded in the Philippines. Meanwhile, Juris is the first Filipino mainstream artist to release an album in South Korea. But before the release of her mini-album in Korea, it would be recalled that her song "Say You Love Me" taken from her former MYMP's album "Versions" that topped the Korean charts, Cyworld and BGM Charts for three months. In promotion of the album she appeared at the "Green Plugged Seoul 2011 Music Festival" on May 14, 2011 at the Nanji Hangang Park. Green Plugged Seoul 2011 is a two-day, multi-stage international festival that offers a variety of art performances including concerts, exhibits, plays, dance and other multi-media event with 117 participating artists from all over the world, including Korea, Finland, the United States, the United Kingdom, Japan, Sweden and the Philippines.

== Track listing ==
No.	Title	Length
1.	"If You And Me (만약에)"	03:45
2.	"Don't Forget (잊지말아요)"	04:14
3.	"Altogether Alone"	04:36
4.	"Officially Missing You"	04:02
5.	"Wishes"	03:29
6.	"Opposites Attract"	04:24

- Track 1 "If You And Me" is the English cover of the Korean song "If" by Taeyeon of Girls' Generation.
- Track 2 "Don't Forget" is the English cover of the Korean song by Baek Ji-young.

== Release history ==
Region	Date	Format	Label
Korea	November 12, 2010	CD, digital	Limelight Productions/OGAM Entertainment
Philippines	January 16, 2011	digital	Star Records

== See also ==
- Juris Official Site
- Twitter of Juris
- Facebook of Juris
- If You and Me on MelOn
