= Get Me =

Get Me may refer to:

- "Get Me" (song), by Justin Bieber in 2020
- "Get Me", a song by Dinosaur Jr. from their 1993 album Where You Been
- "Get Me", a song by Everything But The Girl from their 1994 album Amplified Heart
- "Get Me", a song by MYMP from their 2005 album Beyond Acoustic
- "Get Me", a song by Reset from their 1999 album Play
- "Get Me", a song by Sia from her 2001 album Healing Is Difficult
- "Get Me", a song by Twista from his 2004 album Kamikaze
