= Mountain wind (disambiguation) =

In meteorology, mountain wind is a temporary breeze blowing from the mountains after sunset.

Mountain wind or Mountain Wind can also refer to:

- Ivrea (Centuria), also known as "Mountain Wind", fictional member of the Black Knights in the Japanese web manga Centuria
- Japanese destroyer Yamakaze (1911)
- Japanese destroyer Yamakaze (1936)
- Mountain Wind, a 1993 television show in which Jo Min-su and Kim Sang-joong acted
- "Mountain Wind", song by Filipino pop-rock band True Faith for which they were nominated for the 24th Awit Awards
