= Dreaming of You =

Dreaming of You may refer to:

- Dreaming of You (Selena album) (1995)
  - "Dreaming of You" (Selena song) (1995)
- Dreaming of You (Juris album) (2012) or its title song
- "Dreaming of You" (The Coral song) (2002)
- "Dreamin' of You" (Celine Dion song) (1996)
- "Dreamin' of You" (Bob Dylan song), an out-take from the 1997 album Time Out Of Mind
- "Dreamin' of You", a 2013 song by Buckcherry from Confessions
- "Dreaming of You", a 2012 song by Cigarettes After Sex from I.
- "Dreaming of You", a 2001 song by Sloan from Pretty Together
- "Dreaming of You", a 1981 song by Diana Ross and Lionel Richie from the Endless Love soundtrack album
