= Forevermore (Juris album) =

Studio album by Juris
- Released: July 22, 2011
- Genre: Pop, OPM
- Length: 58:14
- Language: English, Tagalog
- Label: Star Recording, Inc.
- Producer: Malou N. Santos (executive); Annabelle R. Borja (executive); Jonathan Manalo; Jungee Marcelo; Gino Cruz; Arnold Buena; Ian Umali; Aiza Seguerra; Duncan Ramos

Juris chronology
| If You And Me (EP) (2010) | Forevermore (2011) | Paskong Puno ng Kasiyahan (2012) |

Singles from Forevermore
- 1. "Kahit 'Di Mo Sabihin" Released: July 29, 2011

Forevermore is the second studio album by Filipino singer Juris, released on July 22, 2011 by Star Records in the Philippines in CD format and in digital download through iTunes and Amazon.com. It consists of 13 tracks including ten original OPM compositions and two Korean cover songs.

== Background ==
Forevermore also includes an original composition of Juris called "Bliss" and four OPM cover songs including Side A original song "Forevermore". The album was placed number 2 upon release at nationwide sales in Odyssey Music and Videos chart and Astrovision/Astroplus report in the Philippines. It became number 1 after two months. The album won at the 24th Philippine Awit Awards for Album of the Year.

== Track listing ==
| No. | Title | Writer(s) | Length |
|---|---|---|---|
| 1. | "Dreaming Away" | Charmi Rose Santos | 04:13 |
| 2. | "Forevermore" | Joey Benin | 04:54 |
| 3. | "I Believe In You" | Jude Gitamondoc | 05:00 |
| 4. | "Don't Say Goodbye" | Louie Ocampo, Martin Nievera | 04:59 |
| 5. | "Bliss" | Juris Fernandez | 04:25 |
| 6. | "Magkaibang Mundo" | Ebe Dencel | 04:26 |
| 7. | "Sabihin Mo Lang" | Trina Belamide | 04:06 |
| 8. | "Minsan Lang Kitang Iibigin" | Aaron Paul Del Rosario | 04:31 |
| 9. | "Kahit 'Di Mo Sabihin" | Jonathan Manalo | 04:25 |
| 10. | "Not Like You" | Carla Lozada-Concio, Francis Concio | 03:32 |
| 11. | "If You And Me" | An Young Min | 04:29 |
| 12. | "Wishes" | Britt Savage, Toshifumi Hinata | 04:16 |
| 13. | "Kahit Di Mo Sabihin (full length)" | Jonathan Manalo | 04:58 |

- Track 2 "Forevermore" is originally by Side A from the album By Your Side
- Track 4 "Don't Say Goodbye" is originally by Pops Fernandez from the soundtrack of the film My Neighbor's Wife (2011)
- Track 7 "Sabihin Mo Lang" is originally by Regine Velasquez from the soundtrack of Kailangan Ko'y Ikaw
- Track 8 "Minsan Lang Kitang Iibigin" is originally by Ariel Rivera from the album Simple Lang
- Track 11 "If You and Me" is the English cover of the Korean song "If" by Taeyeon of Girls' Generation
- Track 12 "Wishes" is a cover of the original English version by Britt Savage; the Japanese version is "Hidamari No Uta" (ja:ひだまりの詩) by Le Couple

== See also ==
- Juris Official Site
- Twitter of Juris
- Facebook of Juris
