= Ferdinand Aragon =

Filipino singer and visual artist (born 1994)

- Born: Ferdinand Aragon; October 8, 1994 (age 31); Pardo, Cebu City, Philippines
- Education: University of the Philippines Cebu
- Occupations: Singer; songwriter; visual artist
- Years active: 2014–present
- Musical career
- Genres: Indie folk; folk; Visayan pop; pop rock
- Label: Underdog Music

Ferdinand Aragon (born October 8, 1994) is a Filipino singer, songwriter, and visual artist. From 2014 to 2017, he won first prize at the National Artist Jose T. Joya Awards multiple times for his art pieces critiquing children's social issues, such as child labor.

"Libu-Libo" (transl. Thousands), a Cebuano (Bisaya) song written by Aragon, received the Jury's Choice Award at the Kanta Kasingkasing (transl. Songs of the Heart) contest in 2018. In December that year, his Cebuano song "Di Ko Man" (transl. I May Not) was the first runner-up at the Philippine Popular Music Festival. In July 2019, he became the first ever grand winner for the Visayan Music Awards and released his first Tagalog song, "Dinamalayan" (transl. Unnoticed). In August, "Ingat" (transl. Take Care), a track written by Aragon and performed by Filipino band I Belong to the Zoo, was included in the final Top 12 for the Himig Handog (transl. Musical Offering) songwriting contest.

In March 2020, he released a new version of "Libu-Libo" under Viva Records. In 2024, he released "Ang Paghuwat" (transl. The Waiting), a collaboration with Filipino singer Morissette Amon. In March 2025, his song "Buhi" (transl. Let Go) was announced as the first runner-up at the Himig Handog contest for the year. In October, he received two Awit Awards nominations in the Best Regional Recording Category: one for "Ang Paghuwat" and another for "Buhi". His music has been described as indie folk, folk, Visayan pop, and pop rock.

== Early life and education ==
Ferdinand Aragon was born on August 10, 1994, in Pardo, Cebu City, Philippines. His parents are named Flordelito and Amelita Aragon. In June 2018, he graduated from the University of the Philippines Cebu (UP Cebu) with a degree in Fine Arts.

== Career ==
=== 2014–2018: Beginnings ===
In 2014, Aragon won the first prize in the National Artist Jose T. Joya Awards for his collage art titled "Innocence", which raised awareness towards victims of child sexual abuse material. He was a freshman at UP Cebu at the time.

In 2016, he won first prize in the competition again for another collage art piece titled "Bullet to a Butterfly". He dedicated it to children who were victims of civil unrest, particularly the children affected by the Syrian civil war.

In 2017, he won first prize in the competition for the third time with his university thesis piece "Beast of Burden", made out of paper and torn magazine pages. The artwork was about child labor.

In 2018, a song that Aragon wrote in 2013, "Libu-Libo" (transl. Thousands), became an official entry to the Kanta Kasingkasing (transl. Songs of the Heart) competition. Performed by Vincent Eco, the song received the Jury's Choice Award. In December that year, he was also the first-runner up for the Philippine Popular Music Festival, with the song "Di Ko Man" (transl. I May Not). It is a ballad in Cebuano (Bisaya) that he wrote himself.

=== 2019–present: Visayan Music Awards win, song releases, further recognition ===
On July 27, 2019, Aragon became the first ever grand winner of the Visayan Music Awards in 2019. His winning song, "Matag Piraso" (transl. Every Piece), was inspired by the Japanese art of kintsugi.

On July 31, he released the love song "Dinamalayan" (transl. Unnoticed), his first in Tagalog. It was released as a part of the Linggo ng Musikang Pilipino (transl. Week of Filipino Music), as organized by the Organisasyon ng Pilipinong Mangaawit (transl. Organization of Filipino Singers).

In August 2019, "Ingat" (transl. Take Care), written by Aragon and performed by Filipino band I Belong to the Zoo, was included in the final Top 12 songs of the Himig Handog (transl. Musical Offering) contest.

In March 2020, Aragon released a new version of "Libu-Libo" performed by himself, under Viva Records.

In 2024, he released "Ang Paghuwat" (transl. The Waiting), a collaboration with Filipino singer Morissette Amon.

Rappler's Kara Angan described Aragon as a Visayan pop "juggernaut" in an article published on January 8, 2025.

In March, "Buhi" (transl. Let Go), written by Keith John Quito in Cebuano and performed by Aragon, was announced as the first runner-up in the year's Himig Handog contest.

On September 13, Aragon was one of the performers for Filipino singer-songwriter Colet Vergara's pre-birthday event Kani si Colet (transl. This is Colet). He covered Vergara's Cebuano composition known as "Laban Lang Pirme" (transl. Just Keep Fighting).

In October, he received two Awit Awards nominations in the Best Regional Recording category: one for "Ang Paghuwat", and another for "Buhi".

At Morissette Amon's Ember concert in November, Aragon was a surprise guest. They sang "Ang Paghuwat" together.

== Awards and nominations ==
Award	Year	Category	Nominee(s)	Result	Ref.
Awit Awards	2025	Best Regional Recording	"Ang Paghuwat" with Morissette Amon	Nominated	
Awit Awards	2025	Best Regional Recording	"Buhi"	Nominated	
