= Kaye Cal =

Filipino singer-songwriter

Karen Jade Cal (born February 11, 1989), professionally known as Kaye Cal, is a Filipino singer-songwriter who rose to popularity after becoming a grand finalist of the first season of the talent competition Pilipinas Got Talent, in which she competed in as the lead singer of Ezra Band. She has since been performing as a solo artist and has released several singles.

== Early life ==
Cal was born on February 11, 1989, in Pasay City, Philippines, to Christian parents.

== Career ==
Cal met her future Ezra Band bandmates in her hometown, Davao del Sur. The group eventually competed in the first season of Pilipinas Got Talent, where they became grand finalists. The covers the group performed on the show were released in the Pinoy You Got It album, which is a compilation of songs from the contestants on the show. Their covers of The Corrs' "Runaway" and Eric Clapton's "Wonderful Tonight" were included on the album, along with their original song "Walang Iba" (lit. "No one else").

She garnered attention for her deep, soulful masculine voice, which led to confusion regarding her gender. In an interview with Pep PH in 2010, she revealed that she received surprised reactions from people upon learning that she is a woman since she also "dressed like a man".

The band has since gone on hiatus, starting Cal's career as a solo artist. She started uploading her covers on YouTube regularly, which gained popularity such as her cover of Up dharma Down's song "Tadhana". She released her first single "Isang Araw" in 2015 along with an accompanying music video. The song was part of OPM Fresh, an album that featured up-and-coming OPM artists. Kaye Cal signed with Star Music when the head of the label, Roxy Liquigan, told his team to look for her because he strongly believed in her talent and was attracted to her voice.

In March 2017, Kaye released her self-titled debut album which featured nine tracks, including two original songs ("Rosas" and "Mahal Ba Ako ng Mahal Ko"), three covers, and her past singles ("Walang Iba", "Nyebe", "Isang Araw" and "Give Me A Chance"). In August 2017, Kaye won the OPM Revival of the Year at the 2017 MOR Pinoy Music Awards for the single "Give Me A Chance".

She won the Star Music's Listener's Choice Award at the 2017 Himig Handog Awards for "The Labo Song". Cal was a member of ASAP Jambayan from the segment's launch on October 15, 2017, until February 2018.

== Personal life ==
Kaye Cal has stated that she is "a proud lesbian" and member of the LGBT community, although her sexuality is not accepted by her religious parents, which she admitted is a struggle during an interview with Boy Abunda on his talk show in 2017. In 2010, Kaye initially admitted she was a tomboy and dressed masculine but denied being a lesbian, citing her religion and involvement with the church as a reason, and believed same-sex relationships were wrong but stated she meant no offense to lesbians. She has since been open about her sexuality.

Kaye's masculine voice and appearance has garnered attention since competing on Pilipinas Got Talent and was a subject of discussion among the public. She addressed rumors surrounding her voice in an interview with ABS-CBN in August 2017 and denied taking testosterone medications along with the rumors that she is transgender, while affirming that she is a lesbian.

== Discography ==
- Kaye Cal (2017)

=== Kaye Cal track list ===
1. Ikaw Lang
2. Mahal Ba Ako ng Mahal Ko
3. Why Can't It Be
4. Rosas
5. Kung Ako na lang Sana
6. Walang Iba
7. Isang Araw
8. Nyebe
9. Give Me A Chance

== Filmography ==
Year	Title	Role	Notes
2010	Pilipinas Got Talent	Herself (with Ezra Band)	Grand Finalist
2016	We Love OPM	Herself (with Power Chords)	CelebriTeams
2016	Magandang Buhay	Herself	Guest
2017	Magandang Buhay	Herself	Guest
2017	Tonight with Boy Abunda	Herself	Guest
2017	Gandang Gabi, Vice!	Herself	Guest
2017–present	ASAP	Herself	Performer, member of ASAP Jambayan from October 2017-February 2018

== Awards and nominations ==
Year	Category	Award-giving body	Result
2010	Awit Award for Best Performance by a New Group Recording Artists shared with Ezra Band	Awit Awards	Won
2016	Star Music's Listener's Choice Award in "Nyebe"	Himig Handog 2016	Won
2017	Music's Listener's Choice Award in "The Labo Song"	Himig Handog 2017	Won
2017	OPM Revival of the Year for the single “Give Me a Chance”	DWRR-FM MOR Pinoy Music Awards 2017	Won
2018	Best Acoustic Album of the Year 2017	PMPC Star Awards	Won
2019	100,000 Subscribers	YouTube Silver awards	Won

== Concerts ==
Date	Title	Venue	Description
August 18, 2017	Kaye Pop	Kia Theatre	All opm with Kaye Cal
February 14 to 15, 2019	Valentine Acoustic Night with Kayecal	UAE	February 14 in New Bar Arkadia and February 15 in Boracay Night Club
