= Now Playing (Juris album) =

Studio album by Juris
- Released: February 10, 2010
- Genre: Pop, Adult Contemporary, OPM
- Length: 58:14
- Language: English, Tagalog
- Label: Star Recording, Inc.
- Producer: Malou N. Santos (executive); Annabelle R. Borja (executive); Jonathan Manalo, Jungee Marcelo, Gino Cruz, Arnold Buena, Ian Umali, Aiza Seguerra & Duncan Ramos

Juris chronology
Now Playing (2010)	If You And Me (EP) (2010)

Singles from Now Playing
- 1. "I Don't Want To Fall" Released: February 2010; 2. "'Di Lang Ikaw" Released: March 2010; 3. "Opposites Attract" Released: October 2010

Now Playing is the first studio album by Filipino and former MYMP lead singer Juris on Star Records, released on February 10, 2010, in the Philippines in CD format and in digital download through iTunes and Amazon.com. It contained 14 tracks including 12 original OPM compositions and one cover song. The album was certified platinum.

== Background ==
Juris signed a two-year contract with Star Records after leaving her acoustic group MYMP for six years and Ivory Records. Now Playing serves as her launching album to Star Records which includes two of her original compositions. One of them is produced and musically composed by Aiza Seguerra called “Di Lang Ikaw” that is used as the love theme song of TV series Rubi. The carrier single is "I Don’t Want To Fall". The album consists of pop songs but mainly of ballads. The sound of the album is also a departure from her previous all-acoustic style.

== Certifications ==
The album was certified gold record awarded by Philippine Association of the Record Industry(PARI) in October 2010. And became certified platinum in June 2011.

Country	Provider	Certification
Philippines	PARI	Platinum

== Awards & Citation ==
Year	Award	Category	Notes
2010	2nd PMPC Star Awards For Music	Album of the Year	nomination
2010	2nd PMPC Star Awards For Music	Song of the Year (‘Di Lang Ikaw)	nomination
2011	6th MYX Music Awards	Favorite Female Artist	nomination
2011	6th MYX Music Awards	Favorite Mellow Video ('Di Lang Ikaw)	nomination
2011	2nd Tambayan 101.9 OPM Awards	Female Artist of the Year	win
2011	2nd Tambayan 101.9 OPM Awards	Song of the Year (‘Di Lang Ikaw)	win
2011	24th Awit Awards	Best Performance By A Female Recording Artist	nomination / win*
2011	24th Awit Awards	Song of the Year (‘Di Lang Ikaw)	nomination / win*
2011	24th Awit Awards	Best Ballad (‘Di Lang Ikaw)	nomination / win*
2011	24th Awit Awards	Album of the Year*	nomination / win*

== Track listing ==
No.	Title	Writer(s)	Length
1.	"I Don't Want To Fall"	Cattleya 'Cattski' Espina	04:25
2.	"Getting Over You"	Jimmy Antiporda	04:04
3.	"Opposites Attract"	Jungee Marcelo	04:24
4.	"'Di Lang Ikaw"	Juris Fernandez, Aiza Seguerra	04:49
5.	"Love Letters"	Juris Fernandez	04:24
6.	"Dear You"	Carla Lozada, Francis Concio	04:00
7.	"Kailan Kaya"	Top Suzara	03:49
8.	"Nandiyan Ka Lang Pala"	Ryan Cayabyab	04:19
9.	"You Got Me Here"	Carla Lozada, Cattleya 'Cattski' Espina	04:51
10.	"Beautiful"	Duncan Ramos	03:29
11.	"Who Was I"	Gary Valenciano	04:58
12.	"I Don't Wanna Fall (Stripped Mix)"	Cattleya 'Cattski' Espina	04:18

bonus tracks
No.	Title	Writer(s)	Length
13.	"Nariyan Ka"	Jonathan Manalo	04:31
14.	"I Love You Goodbye"	Diane Warren	03:29

- Track 13 "Nariyan Ka" is also included in May Bukas Pa soundtrack album.
- Track 14 "I Love You Goodbye" is originally by Celine Dion and used as the main theme song of the Filipino film of the same title released by Star Cinema.
