= Dreaming of You (Juris album) =

Studio album by Juris
- Released: September 21, 2012 (Singapore); August 5, 2013 (Philippines)
- Genre: Pop, Adult Contemporary, OPM
- Length: 50:42 (Singapore Standard Edition); 78:48 (Philippines Deluxe Edition)
- Language: English, Tagalog
- Label: S2S Pte. Ltd.(Singapore); Star Recording, Inc.(Philippines)
- Producer: Malou N. Santos (executive); Roxy Liquigan (executive); Malou Suzuki (executive); Jonathan Manalo

Juris chronology
Paskong Puno ng Kasiyahan (2012)	Dreaming of You (2012)	Here's My Heart (2019)

Singles from Dreaming of You
- 1. "Dreaming of You" Released: October 2013

Dreaming of You is the international studio album by Filipino singer Juris, released on September 21, 2012 in Singapore by S2S Pte. Ltd. and on August 5, 2013 in the Philippines by Star Records on CD format and on digital download through iTunes and Amazon.com.

== Background ==
Dreaming of You was initially released in Singapore, containing only 12 English tracks. It topped the jazz chart of Singapore's popular music store HMV. Also, made it to the list of top albums in iTunes Thailand and was one of the featured albums in iTunes Asia. The Philippines deluxe edition contains 19 tracks that features additional OPM songs, mostly TV and Movie theme songs sung by Juris.

== Track listing ==
Singapore Release
No.	Title	Writer(s)	Length
1.	"Dreaming of You"	Franne Golde; Tom Snow	4:38
2.	"Again"	Janet Jackson; James Harris III; Terry Lewis	3:48
3.	"Everything I Do (I Do It for You)"	Bryan Adams	3:54
4.	"If Wishes Came True"		5:32
5.	"I Honestly Love You"	Peter Allen; Jeff Barry; Olivia Newton-John	3:24
6.	"Do You Know Where You're Going To"	Michael Masser; Gerald Goffin	3:56
7.	"Say You Love Me"		3:26
8.	"If You and Me"		4:32
9.	"I Love You Goodbye"	Diane Warren	3:32
10.	"Wishes"		4:17
11.	"Don't Say Goodbye"	Louie Ocampo; Martin Nievera	4:59
12.	"Now That You're Gone"		4:43

Philippines Deluxe Edition
No.	Title	Writer(s)	Length
1.	"Dreaming of You"	Franne Golde; Tom Snow	4:38
2.	"Again"	Janet Jackson; James Harris III; Terry Lewis	3:48
3.	"Everything I Do (I Do It for You)"		3:54
4.	"If Wishes Came True"		5:32
5.	"I Honestly Love You"		3:24
6.	"Do You Know Where You're Going To"	Michael Masser; Gerald Goffin	3:56
7.	"Say You Love Me"		3:26
8.	"If You and Me"		4:32
9.	"Wishes"		4:17
10.	"Now That You're Gone"	Sharon Cuneta	4:43
11.	"Got To Believe In Magic"		4:17
12.	"Tubig At Langis"		3:21
13.	"Hanggang Wakas"	Soc Villanueva	4:13
14.	"Sa Isip Ko"		3:40
15.	"Akala Mo"	Aiza Seguerra	3:57
16.	"Kahit Isang Saglit"		4:48
17.	"Di Ko Inakala"		3:30
18.	"Dahil Sa'yo"	Carla Lozada – Concio; Francis Concio	4:43
19.	"Sa'yo Lamang"		3:47
