= I Belong to the Zoo =

Filipino indie pop rock band formed in 2014

- Origin: Quezon City, Philippines
- Genres: indie rock; folk music; pop rock
- Years active: 2014–present
- Label: Yellow Room Music Philippines
- Members: Argee Guerrero; Simon Clariza; Lee De Veyra; Gere Guerrero; Ow Owyong

I Belong to the Zoo is a Filipino indie pop rock band which started as a solo folk project by Argee Guerrero. After the success of their debut studio album, Guerrero expanded the project into a band with Simon Clariza and Lee De Veyra on guitars, Gere Guerrero on bass, and Ow Owyong on drums. The band has more than three hundred million total Spotify streams, averaging 1.2 million monthly listeners.

Associated acts of the band include Mayonnaise, Reese Lansangan, Moira Dela Torre, Gabba Santiago, Clara Benin, Paolo Tabuena of Runway Crimes, and Tonight We Sleep. Tabuena is a frequent collaborator of the band, and has directed the music video of their song "Paumanhin". Guerrero is also the vocalist and guitarist of the band Tonight We Sleep.

== History ==
=== Performing solo, 2002–2007 ===
As a grade 7 student, Guerrero was exposed to live rock performances, which inspired him to pursue a career in music.

Guerrero began performing solo acoustic shows and using his own name, but found it challenging as he perceived the use of his own name as boastful. He then performed under the stage name Fireplace Letters.

By 2007, Guerrero stopped performing solo and went on to form the band Tonight We Sleep.

=== Tonight We Sleep, 2007–present ===
Guerrero, Ton Vergel de Dios (guitar), Rex Ferriols (bass) and Paolo Owyong (drums) formed the band Tonight We Sleep in 2007. Guerrero and Owyong served as songwriters for the band.

=== I Belong to the Zoo, the solo project, 2014–2018 ===
In 2014, Guerrero started a solo musical career as he felt that some of the songs that he wrote are too mellow and emotional for Tonight We Sleep. Guerrero said that he incorporates his personal experience in the songs for I Belong to the Zoo, which is not the case for the songs he wrote for Tonight We Sleep.

The name I Belong to the Zoo came from a parody of Happy Birthday to You with the lyrics, “Happy birthday to you, I belong to the zoo” which Guerrero used to serenade his then-girlfriend. Guerrero further explained that the phrase described himself in a nutshell saying, "The name kind of just stuck [...] As a kid, I was teased for the way I look. ‘I belong to the zoo’ was my way of owning it.”

In 2017, I Belong to the Zoo released its self-titled debut album.

=== I Belong to the Zoo, the band, 2018–present ===
After the success of the first album, I Belong to the Zoo then expanded to a five-member band which is now composed of Guerrero (vocals and guitar), Owyong (drums), Simon Clariza (guitar), Lee De Veyra (guitar), and Gerald Guerrero (bass).

After testing positive for COVID-19 in August 2020, Guerrero advised his fans to stay home and wear masks properly. He was able to recover within the same month. Along with the news of his recovery, he released a cover of Taking Back Sunday's "MakeDamnSure" with Tabuena and Paolo Owyong.

In 2021, the band released its second studio album, Kapiling.

In 2024, the band released its third studio album, afteryou.

== Musical style and influences ==
I Belong to the Zoo's music has been described as folk, indie rock, and currently, pop rock. It was described as in the same musical territory of Keaton Henson, William Fitzsimmons, Dallas Green, and Damien Rice. Guerrero further explained that he listened to lots of Rice's music which became the main influence for I Belong to the Zoo. However, according to Guerrero, his music influences are mostly OPM rock bands such as Greyhoundz, Slapshock, and Quezo.

When it comes to songwriting, Guerrero cites Dashboard Confessional as a key influence, particularly how the vocalist Chris Carraba performed in their MTV Unplugged 2.0 live album.

== Band members ==
- Argee Guerrero – lead vocals, guitars
- Simon Clariza – guitars
- Lee De Veyra – guitars
- Gere Guerrero – bass
- Paolo "Ow" Owyong – drums

== Discography ==
=== Albums ===
- I Belong to the Zoo (Self-released, 2017)
- Kapiling (Self-released, 2021)
- afteryou. (Self-released, 2024)

=== Singles ===
==== As lead artist ====
Title	Year	Album
"Never Me"	2014	I Belong to the Zoo
"Sana"	2018	Kapiling
"Balang Araw"	2018	Kapiling
"Patawad, Paalam" (Moira Dela Torre & I Belong to the Zoo)	2019	Non-album single
"Kapit"	2020	Kapiling
"Paumanhin"	2020	Kapiling
"Para kay Catriona"	2020	Non-album single
"Oras"	2021	Kapiling
"Maybe"	2021	Non-album singles
"Hands to Heaven"	2022	Non-album singles
"Aalis Ka Ba?"	2022	Non-album singles
"Tama Nga Sila"	2023	Non-album singles
"Hakbang"	2023	afteryou.
"Masaya"	2023	afteryou.
"Pagod"	2023	afteryou.
"Relapse"	2024	afteryou.
"'Di Bale Na Lang"	2024	afteryou.

==== As featured artist ====
Title	Year	Album
"Pahirapan" (Mayonnaise featuring I Belong to the Zoo)	2020	Friends & Family
"Hindi Masaya" (CHNDTR featuring I Belong to the Zoo)	2020	Non-album single

=== In other media ===
In 2017, the songs "Porter", "Ruin" (with Reese Lansangan), and "Pity Party" appeared in the TV5 series, Forever Sucks.

In 2019, "Sana" appeared in the film Open.

In 2021, the WeTV series Pasabuy used "Balang Araw", "In an Instant" (Note: "In an Instant" is unreleased and only appears in Pasabuy.), and "Pansamantala".

== Awards and nominations ==
Award Ceremony	Year	Category	Nominee(s)/work(s)	Result
14th Myx Music Awards	2019	New Artist of the Year	I Belong to the Zoo	Won
14th Myx Music Awards	2019	Performance of the Year	I Belong to the Zoo	Won
4th Wish 107.5 Music Awards	2019	Ballad Performance of the Year	I Belong to the Zoo – “Sana”	Nominated
4th Wish 107.5 Music Awards	2019	Ballad Song of the Year	“Balang Araw” – I Belong To The Zoo	Won
4th Wish 107.5 Music Awards	2019	Promising Artist of the Year	I Belong To The Zoo	Nominated
Himig Handog	2019	Best Song	“Ingat” (Composer: Ferdinand Aragon; Interpreter: I Belong to the Zoo)	Top 12 Finalist
MOR Pinoy Music Awards	2019	Digital Artist of the Year	I Belong To The Zoo for “Sana”	Nominated
15th Myx Music Awards	2020	Collaboration of the Year	“Patawad, Paalam” – Moira Dela Torre and I Belong to the Zoo	Nominated
5th Wish 107.5 Music Awards	2020	Collaboration of the Year	“Patawad, Paalam” – Moira Dela Torre and I Belong to the Zoo	Nominated
11th PMPC Star Awards for Music	2020	Song of the Year	“Sana” – I Belong to the Zoo (Yellow Room Music Philippines)	Nominated
16th Myx Music Awards	2021	Rock Video of the Year	“Pahirapan” – Mayonnaise ft. I Belong To The Zoo (Director: Juancho Pancho)	Nominated
6th Wish 107.5 Music Awards	2021	Rock/Alternative Performance of the Year	I Belong to the Zoo – “Balita”	Nominated
6th Wish 107.5 Music Awards	2021	Rock/Alternative Performance of the Year	Mayonnaise (ft. I Belong to the Zoo) – “Pahirapan”	Nominated
12th PMPC Star Awards for Music	2021	Song of the Year	“Patawad, Paalam” – Moira Dela Torre and I Belong to the Zoo	Nominated
7th Wish 107.5 Music Awards	2022	Rock/Alternative Song of the Year	“Wala Lang” – I Belong To The Zoo	Nominated
13th PMPC Star Awards for Music	2022	Music Video of the Year	“A Trilogy: Patawad Paalam, Paalam and Patawad" – Moira Dela Torre feat. I Belong To The Zoo and Ben&Ben (Star Music)	Nominated
