= Freddie Santos =

Filipino film director (1956–2020)

- Born: February 29, 1956; Quezon City, Philippines
- Died: December 17, 2020 (aged 64)
- Occupations: film director, television director, theater director, and concert director

Freddie Santos (February 29, 1956 – December 17, 2020) was a Filipino film director, television director, theater director, and concert director.

== Theatre career ==
Santos was born in Quezon City, Metro Manila. His early studies were at Lourdes School (Quezon City), Sacred Heart School. For his college education, he initially enrolled at the University of the Philippines at Cebu in Lahug, Cebu City and later transferred to the University of Southern Philippines (Cebu City). As a Rotex Scholar in Arvada West, Colorado, he was trained by David Helm in drama and by Rex Nelson in music.

Upon his return to Manila, he was hired by advertising company Dentsu to join its copy department and within three months, he was promoted to copy chief at the age of eighteen. After two years he moved to working in theatre.

He was mentored in voice by his uncle, the baritone Aurelio Santos Estanislao, who at that time headed the Voice Department at the College of Music, University of the Philippines. Santos joined Repertory Philippines as well as Teatro Pilipino, Musical Theater Philippines, and SRO Philippines.

At twenty, he was awarded "Most Outstanding Youth" in Theatre. He was professionally involved, either as actor, coach, assistant director or director in more than a hundred stage plays and musicales. After five years with Repertory Philippines where he was also active in the research and publicity committees, he eventually moved to SRO Philippines where the focus was on dinner theater and where he found the freedom to further develop his other skills. Here, Santos wrote an original play adapted from the book Paper Moon and headlined by a very young Lea Salonga during its premiere run. He also nurtured his skill in stage lighting, make-up and choreography.

A major highlight of his theater career came in the early 1980s where he toured the musical Walang Sugat (No Wound) through 10 cities in America as Technical Director, honing his craft as he worked the technical controls of places like the San Francisco Opera House, the Chicago Civic Opera House, and Avery Fisher Hall at the Lincoln Center, among others.

All told, Freddie Santos has been involved with the performing arts for over forty years now, winning thrice the Aliw Award for Best Stage Director in the country, the first to win the award in both categories of Stage Musical ('87, '00) and Concert ('08).

He has written and staged the musical plays First Name, Joseph the Dreamer, So David..., Widows, Orphans, and Wildebeests, Il Divino, and Sabel: Love and Passion.

== Music career ==
In the 1990s, Santos also began singing in lounges, and his weekly comedy acts at Tita Lola's Café Alvarado became quite popular with young professionals, garnering him rave reviews in the papers. It was then he was asked to direct a lounge show by jazz queen Jacqui Magno and its impact on his life encouraged him to abandon his performing career to fast become one of the country's top concert directors with a distinctive crossover directorial style that combines theater with pop and cutting-edge technology. He has written, designed and/or directed more than 400 pop, rock and roll, and classical concerts totaling over 1,500 performances, working with artists such as Lea Salonga, Monique Wilson, Regine Velasquez, Joey Albert, Gary Valenciano, Jamie Rivera, Janno Gibbs, Ogie Alcasid, The Dawn, NeoColours, Introvoys, Raymond Lauchengco, Rico J. Puno, Imelda Papin, Rey Valera, Hajji Alejandro, groups like Tux, Men and Music, Boys Will Be Boys, newbies Morrisette Amon and Tanya Manalang, and opera singers Rachelle Gerodias and Byeong-in Park, as well as Grammy winners like Sandi Patti, First Call, David Pomeranz, and Broadway/West End artists Leo Valdez, Jose Llana, and Mig Ayesa.

His directing career also gave him a chance to direct concerts at New York's Carnegie Hall and at Manhattan Town Hall.

On top of that, he has also written a number of pop songs, several of which have gone platinum, like Yakapin Mo Ako (Embrace Me), Points of View, Could You Be Messiah, as well as Lea Salonga's wedding song, "Two Words." He has often worked as lyricist to award-winning composers, such as Louie Ocampo, Von de Guzman, Dan and Geri Gil, Marvin Querido, and Gerard Salonga."

== Other work ==
He served as corporate events director for companies such as Sony (10 National Conventions, 2 World Conventions), Bayer (5 Bayer Young Environmental Envoy Programme Awards, 1st Bayer-UNDP Eco-Forum), Microsoft (Philippine Launch of XP, OS2000), Citibank (2 Citibank Excellence Awards, Voice of Citibank affairs), Philippine Airlines (5 Sales Awards Nights), Philippine Long Distance Telephone Company (80th Anniversary Launch, PLDT/Smart Foundation Launch), Smart Communications (Annual Smart Infinity Golf Classic, various company events), Kia (Launch of Kia Pride), Destiny Cable (Launch of Various Products), NXP (Philippine Launch), Concepcion Industries (Conventions/Product Launches in Kuala Lumpur, Hong Kong, Manila), Young Presidents' Organization World Convention, SMX Convention Center (Launch), Philippine International Convention Center (15th Anniversary Celebration).

He has directed social events including five state dinners/presentations for HRH Bolkiah of Brunei with guests of honor Malaysian Prime Minister Mahathir Mohamad and Prince Charles of the UK, Grand Philippine Reception/Performance for former Prime Minister of the UK and Ireland Mr. Tony Blair, as well as the 80th Birth Anniversary and 50th Wedding Anniversary of Taipan Henry Sy. He has directed over two dozen reunion homecomings of the country's most prestigious schools like La Salle, St. Scholastica's, Assumption, and St. Therese's College, Manila.

He has done quite a number of spoken word recordings, several of which serve as vocal guide for the permanent exhibits of the Ayala Museum in Makati, and the Aguinaldo Shrine in Kawit, Cavite. His recordings were aired as well in several countries on European Radio. Several of his sessions were aired on national television in two high-rating weekly musical shows and in a well-received podcast—one of the first Filipinos to air one.

He was regularly viewed on GMA-7 as one of the judges in the high-rating Starstruck and Celebrity Duets.

In television, Santos directed 'Yan Ang Bata (Channel 7, Catholic Mass Media Awards Winner), Musikatbp. (Channel 5, 13, CMMA Winner), The Manilyn Reynes Musical Show (Channel 13), The CBN Drama Special (USA, Sequence Director), Mikael (Indonesia, Sequence Director), Love Lea (Channel 4, Sequence Director), Triple Treat (Channel 2 Sequence Director), and 24 music videos for Channel 13.

His latest achievement in video is the 10-part documentary on the life and works of International Spanish artist, Philippine Presidential Order of Merit Recipient, and Cross of Isabella Awardee -- Juvenal Sanso.

Since the 1990s, he has also been a board member of House of Refuge, a shelter devoted to looking after abused and abandoned streetchildren.

In exploring new techniques and formats, Santos wrote Sabel: Love and Passion, which combined poetry/ballet/pop singing/telenovela into a 1 ½-hour spectacle. Inspired by the Sabel paintings of National Artist Ben Cabrera, and given impetus by BBC broadcaster Rico Hizon, the show, with music composed by Louie Ocampo, won a Stage Crossover Award for its leading lady, Iza Calzado, from Broadway World Philippines, and a nomination for Best New Concept from the Aliw Awards.

Because he is a Hall of Famer, Santos himself can no longer be nominated at future Aliw Awards. But for several straight years, he served as director of the annual anniversary staging of the Aliw Awards, headlining its Hall of Famers.

Over the decades, unsurprisingly, Santos was part of the formation of several crucial coalitions, among them, the Organisasyon ng Pilipinong Mang-Aawit (Organization of Philippine Singers), Philstage (composed of various professional theater and dance companies), and Trumpets, Asia's first fully-professional gospel theatre group.

In 2018, he shifted once more in his career path and joined Manila Hotel, one of Asia's oldest and most prestigious hotels, to become its Events Consultant primarily handling entertainment. In line with this, he took charge of Manila Hotel's CSR campaign involving the clean-up of Manila Bay, and for which Santos directed nearly 3 dozen short videos in 2019 featuring local art and showbiz personalities. With National Artist Ryan Cayabyab writing the music, Santos penned the lyrics of the theme song of the campaign: Manila Bay, Atin 'to! (This is ours!). In the same year, Santos wrote three dozen poems which he produced into a video book with the help of Strong Media Corporation of Enar and Sisa Karlsson. Entitled Random:Unsung, the poems were done in spoken word by Santos, Isabella Gonzales, and Jamie Wilson.

In the mid-2010s, he was granted his own star in the Eastwood Walk of Fame, and in 2020, he was unanimously voted to be given the Natatanging Buhay (Distinguished Life) Award by Philstage.

== Death ==
Santos died on December 17, 2020, at age 64. He also had diabetes.
