= Beyond Acoustic =

Studio album by MYMP
- Released: 2005
- Recorded: 2005
- Genre: Acoustic
- Length: 48:57
- Label: Ivory Music
- Producer: Antonio M. Ocampo (exec.); Papa Zu (album producer)

MYMP chronology
Versions (2005)	Beyond Acoustic (2005)	MYMP Live: Especially For You at the Music Museum (2006)

Beyond Acoustic is an album by Philippine acoustic band MYMP (Make Your Momma Proud), released under Ivory Music in 2005. Beyond Acoustic was the biggest selling album ever produced by an acoustic band. The album debuted at number six on the Philippine Top Albums chart, It had been certified Gold Record after less than a month having sold 15,000 copies, To date the album had sold 210,700 copies in the Philippines.

== Commercial performance ==
In the Philippines, Beyond Acoustic debuted at number six on the Philippine Top Albums chart on July 15, 2005, spending two weeks on the chart. After selling over 15,000 copies in the Philippines, the album was certified PARI Gold. To date, Beyond Acoustic has sold 210,700 copies in the Philippines.

== Track listing ==
No.	Title	Writer(s)	Original artist(s)	Length
1.	"Get Me"	Raymund Ryan	MYMP	3:14
2.	"Tell Me Where It Hurts"	Diane Warren	The Real Milli Vanilli	4:13
3.	"Kailan"	Ryan Cayabyab	Smokey Mountain	4:37
4.	"Magical Feeling"	Words by Carla Lozada & Juris Fernandez, Music by Chin Alcantara & Juris Fernandez	MYMP	3:58
5.	"Sa Kanya"	Ito Rapadas	Ogie Alcasid	4:51
6.	"Jam (Set Your Spirits Free)"	Chin Alcantara	MYMP	2:53
7.	"When I Dream"	Carol Kidd	Crystal Gayle	3:27
8.	"Would You Be My Girlfriend?"	Chin Alcantara	MYMP	5:54
9.	"Talaga Naman"	Raymund Ryan	MYMP	4:09
10.	"Rush"	Juris Fernandez	MYMP	3:49
11.	"Fast Car"	Tracy Chapman	Tracy Chapman	5:30
12.	"Ginoo, Walay Sukod (Praise Song)"	Juris Fernandez & Carla Lozada	MYMP	2:22

== Personnel ==
- Antonio M. Ocampo - Executive producer
- Papa Zu - Album producer
- Grace de Leon - A&R direction
- Jon Daza - A&R coordination
- Bernardo Placido, Jr. - Album package design & digital imaging
- Chin Alcantara - Arranger (all songs)
- Annie Quintos - Vocal supervision
- Ponz Martinez - Song recording & mastering
- Joel mendoza - Song mixing
- Snaffu Rigor - Additional musician (percussion)
- Rico Sobrevinas - Additional musician (flute)
- Pierre Cruz - Photography
- Effie Go of Visage Salon - Hair & make-up
- Carla Lozada - MYMP management
