= MYMP =

Filipino acoustic band

M.Y.M.P.
- Also known as: Make Your Momma Proud
- Origin: Quezon City, Philippines
- Genre: Acoustic
- Years active: 2003–present
- Labels: Ivory Music; Star Records; Galaxy/PolyEast Records
- Members: Chin Alcantara; Juliet Bahala; Aaron Cadaing; Benj Bamba; Ethyl Bahala; Gen Lapinid
- Past members: Fritz Ednacot; Mark Esguerra; Ebet Ednacot; Nina Girado; Hannche Bobis; Juris Fernandez; Mike Manahan; Andrew Advincula; John Angeles; Emil Rivas; Oja Jimenez; Jana Laraza; Carmella Ravanilla; Rodnie Resos

M.Y.M.P. (or MYMP, short for Make Your Momma Proud) is an acoustic band from Quezon City, Philippines. They released their first album, Soulful Acoustic in 2003 and a double album, Beyond Acoustic which was a number six charting album, and number two charting album Versions in 2005, the second album was the best-selling album by an acoustic band having sold 285,700 album sales.

== Background ==
=== Origin (1996–2002) ===
Jacques "Chin" Alcantara founded the band in 1996 as an amateur rock band.

The band transitioned to pop music when they had a female vocalist, Nina in 2000. When she left for a solo career a year later, Juris from Davao took her place.

=== Early career (2003–2004) ===
It was the trio of Alcantara, Juris Fernandez and percussionist Mike Manahan that established the beachhead for M.Y.M.P.’s frontal assault on the sales and radio charts.

Their recording career began after Raymund Ryan Santes, then station manager of iFM 93.9, attended one of the band's live performances. Following the performance, Santes worked with a record producer to develop M.Y.M.P.'s debut album, Soulful Acoustic, which was released by Ivory Music & Video during the label's 20th anniversary. The band achieved commercial success with the original composition "A Little Bit", written by Santes, which received the People's Choice Favorite Song award at the 2004 Awit Awards. M.Y.M.P. also gained recognition for its acoustic renditions of Sting's "Every Little Thing She Does Is Magic" and Bob Marley's "Waiting in Vain".

Santes is related to Mikoj Santes-Canoy, a Filipino writer and content creator with interests in vintage culture, music history, and media preservation. According to published sources, Santes-Canoy has documented and promoted historical recordings, vintage memorabilia, and nostalgia-related topics through his online work.

M.Y.M.P. became a duo when one of their members decided to leave the group. Manahan left the band in mid-2004 due to what Alcantara called “professional differences” as well as a fallout from Manahan’s breakup with Fernandez; the two were in a relationship for a while. Yet, this did not stop M.Y.M.P.'s Juris & Chin from sharing their music, touring as a duo to promote their album.

=== Critical and commercial success (2005–2008) ===
The duo enjoyed their ride in the Philippine music scene as a new and improved M.Y.M.P. had emerged, a quartet together with Andrew and John as bassist and kahonista, respectively, as two more albums were released in a year. Versions and Beyond Acoustic, both 12-track albums. Beyond Acoustic debuted album number six on the Philippine Top Albums chart and was certified Gold after less than a month having sold 15,000 copies, to date the album had sold 210,700 copies in the Philippines making it the best-selling acoustic band album. They then recorded their double-disc 2nd album, Versions and Beyond Acoustic.

On October 1, 2005, MYMP had their first concert at the Music Museum, titled 'Especially For You'. The success of the concert prompted the band to hold its first major concert at the Araneta Coliseum on November 18, 2005, and a repeat on February 3, 2006. In December 2006, MYMP released their fourth studio-album New Horizon which debuted at number three in Philippines, and was certified PARI Platinum with 30,000 copies sold. MYMP embarked on a US summer tour in 2006 and 2007.

In 2008, MYMP's contract with Ivory Music expired and signed a deal with Star Records, releasing their last album with Ivory Music, Now.

=== Departure of Juris Fernandez, label and lineup changes (2009–2018) ===
On November 5, 2009, Juris Fernandez was expelled from MYMP due to "irreconcilable professional differences". Contract disputes froze Chin and MYMP for 2 years, preventing them from recording outside Star Records, which was Juris' label.

On January 24, 2010, Juliet Bahala was introduced as the new vocalist of M.Y.M.P. on ASAP. Bahala, then an 18-year-old regional singing champ, also came from Davao like its previous female vocalist. She sang on M.Y.M.P.'s second live album The Unreleased Acoustic Collection which was released in May 2011 under Galaxy Records.

During the promotion of the album, Bahala suffered severe vocal fatigue, laryngitis and vocal nodules which eventually forced her to rest indefinitely. She was temporarily replaced by Vanessa Rangadhol from November 2011 to March 2013. Jana Laraza was later chosen via audition, and release the single "Electrified" and remained their vocalist until mid-2018.

=== Recent history (2018–present) ===
Carmella Ravanilla was chosen as vocalist in 2018. A few months earlier, MYMP returned to their original label, Ivory Music. The song "Wishes & Dreams" was released after almost 6 years of not recording new material. In July 2022, Juliet Bahala rejoined the group, then in January 2023, the group added 2nd female vocalist, Ethyl Bahala, the sister of Juliet Bahala.

==== Blackface controversy ====
On October 30, 2020, MYMP went live on Facebook for a Halloween show with Chin Alcantara wearing blackface. In the session, the group stated that the Black Lives Matter movement was not to be supported and was propaganda, saying "All Lives Matter". Tremendous backlash with over 1,000 comments on the live, with the majority denouncing MYMP's use of race as a costume.

== Discography ==
- Soulful Acoustic (2003)
- Versions (2005)
- Beyond Acoustic (2005)
- New Horizon (2006)
- Now (2008)
- The Unreleased Acoustic Collection (2011)
- The MYMP Anthology A Decade After (2012)
- Electrified: 10th Anniversary Edition (2014)

== Band members ==
Current members

- Chin Alcantara – lead guitar and vocals
- Juliet Bahala – lead vocals (2010–2011, 2022–present)
- Ethyl Bahala – lead vocals (2023–present)
- Aaron Cadaing – bass
- Benj Bamba – drums
- Gen Lapinid – keyboards

Past members

- Fritz Ednacot – guitar and vocals (1996-1999)
- Mark Esguerra – drums (1996–1999)
- Hannche Bobbis – keyboard (1996-2013)
- Ebet Ednacot – bass (1996–2004)
- Nina – lead vocals (1999–April 2001)
- Juris Fernandez – lead vocals (2001–November 2009)
- Mike Manahan – vocals and percussions (1999–July 2004)
- John Angeles - drums (2004-2009)
- Andrew Advincula – bass (2004-2006)
- Joel Tolentino – drums (2004-2018)
- Amiel Rivas – bass (2006-2009)
- Oja Jimenez – keyboards (2006-2009)
- Jeff Lima – drums (January 2010-2012)
- Bong Maquito – keyboards (2013-2018)
- Vanessa Rangadhol – lead vocals (November 2011–January 2013)
- Jana Laraza – lead vocals (February 2013-September 2018)
- Carmella Ravanilla – lead vocals (2018–2022)
- Rodnie Resos – keyboards (2020-2023)

== Awards and nominations ==
Year	Award giving body	Category	Nominated work	Results
2004	Awit Awards	People's Choice Favorite Song	"A Little Bit"	Won
2004	SOP Music Awards	Best Acoustic Act	—N/a	Won
2005	Aliw Awards	Best Pop Performance in Hotel, Music Lounges and Bars	—N/a	Won
2005	ASAP Platinum Circle Awards	Top Awardee	"Versions and Beyond"	Won
2005	SOP Music Awards	Viewer's Choice for Artist of the Year; Revive '05 Category	"Tell Me Where It Hurts"	Won
2006	Aliw Awards	Best Performance in a Concert	—N/a	Won
2006	GMMSF Box-Office Entertainment Awards	Most Popular Recording Group	—N/a	Won
2006	MYX Music Awards	Favorite MYX Live Performance	—N/a	Won
2006	MYX Music Awards	Favorite Artist	—N/a	Nominated
2006	MYX Music Awards	Favorite Group	—N/a	Nominated
2006	MYX Music Awards	Favorite Remake	"Tell Me Where It Hurts"	Nominated
2007	ASAP's 24k Gold Awards	Gold Record Award	"New Horizon"	Won
2007	ASAP Platinum Circle Awards	Band Awardee	"New Horizon"	Won
2007	ASAP's Pop Viewer's Choice Awards	Best Band Performance in a Music Video	"Only Reminds Me of You"	Won
2008	MYX Music Awards	Favorite Mellow Video	"Only Reminds Me Of You"	Nominated
2009	Awit Awards	Best Christmas Wishlist	for the album "Now"	Won
2009	Digital Music Awards (Korea)	August International Artist	—N/a	Won
2009	PMPC Star Awards	Best Duo/Group Artist of the Year	—N/a	Won
