= Juris Fernandez =

Filipino singer and songwriter (born 1978)

Juris Fernandez-Lim
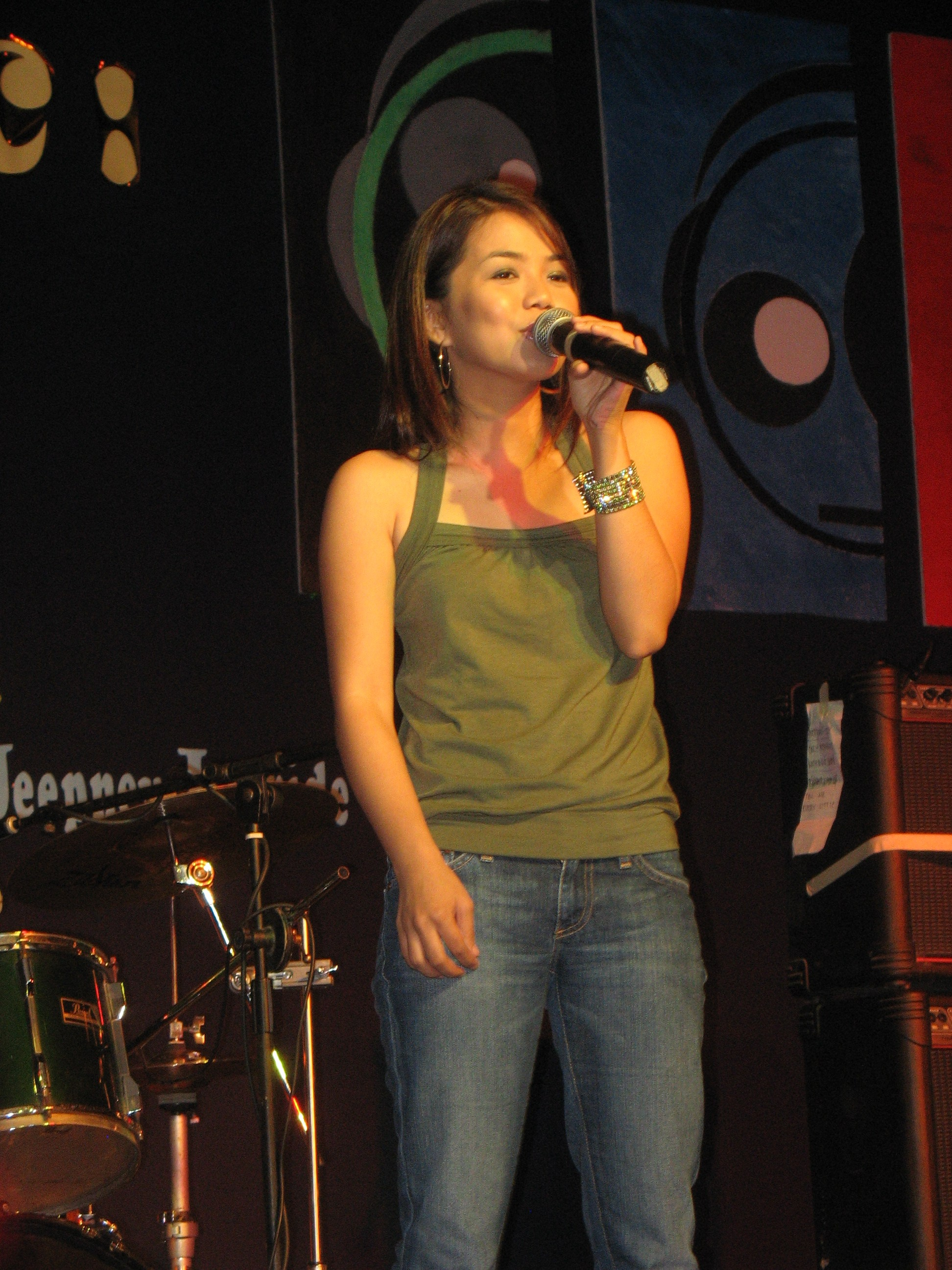
- Fernandez performing at Asia Pacific College in 2006.
- Born: Julie Iris Valle Fernandez; March 18, 1978 (age 48); Davao City, Philippines
- Occupations: Singer; songwriter
- Years active: 2003–present
- Spouse: Gavin Lim (m. 2011)
- Children: 2
- Musical career
- Genres: Pop; acoustic; OPM
- Occupations: Singer; songwriter
- Years active: 2003–present
- Labels: Ivory Music & Video (2003–2009); Star Music (2009–present); Limelight Productions, OGAM Entertainment (South Korea); S2S Pte. Ltd. (Singapore)
- Website: juris.com.ph

Julie Iris "Juris" Fernandez-Lim (born Julie Iris Valle Fernandez; March 18, 1978), also known mononymously as Juris, is a Filipino singer and songwriter. From 2001 to 2009, she was the lead singer of acoustic group MYMP. Following her departure from MYMP, Fernandez signed with Star Music as a solo artist. Her solo debut album, Now Playing, was released in February 2010.

== Biography ==
Fernandez was born on March 18, 1978, in Davao City, Philippines. She is the daughter of an engineer father, and an obstetrician-gynecologist mother. Her older sister is also an obstetrician-gynecologist. She went to high school at the Ateneo de Davao University. She studied college at Miriam College in Manila, finishing Bachelor of Science in Psychology. She is presently taking up a master's degree at the Ateneo de Manila University. In November 2011, she married Gavin Lim.

== Career ==
=== 2001–2009: MYMP ===
Fernandez started her recording career as the lead vocalist of the acoustic group MYMP after auditioning in 2001. She was signed to Ivory Records together with her bandmates Chin Alcantara and Mike Manahan. Their recording career started when Raymond Ryan, the station manager of iFM, watched their gig. Ryan met with a producer to produce their debut album, Soulful Acoustic. Ivory Records then became their recording company. M.Y.M.P.'s debut album was released oduring their label's 20th anniversary. The band became famous with their original hit song "A Little Bit" (which won the People's Choice "Favorite Song" Award in Awit Awards 2004) and cover versions of Sting's "Every Little Thing" and Bob Marley's "Waiting in Vain". Manahan later left the band in June 2004 due to what was called "professional differences".

Alcantara and Fernandez continued as a duo and emerged together with Andrew and John as bassist and kahonista, respectively, as two more albums were released in a year. Beyond Acoustic and Versions, both 12-track albums, were declared certified Gold after less than a month. Their original hit song "Get Me", and covers "Tell Me Where It Hurts", "Kailan", "Especially for You" and "Eternal Flame", were later used as theme songs for TV series and commercial ads.

In early 2009, MYMP were regularly seen every Sunday on ABS-CBN's variety show ASAP's "Sessionistas" segment together with Nina, Aiza Seguerra, Sitti, Richard Poon and Duncan Ramos. In November 2009, it was announced that she was leaving the band to pursue as a solo career. It was also stated that she had signed a recording contract with Star Records.

=== 2010–2011: Solo career, Now Playing, If You and Me, Juris Celebrates, Forevermore ===
Upon leaving MYMP, Fernandez signed with Star Records. Now Playing serves as her launching album to Star Records which includes two of her original compositions. One of them is the massive hit, "Di Lang Ikaw" which was used as the love theme song of TV series Rubi. "Di lang Ikaw" is a collaboration between Juris who wrote the lyrics and Ice Seguerra who arranged the song. The carrier single is "I Don't Want To Fall". The album consists of pop songs but mainly of ballads. The sound of the album is also a departure from her previous all-acoustic style.

In November 2010, Juris released If You and Me mini album in South Korea in CD format and digital download. It consists of 6 tracks including 2 English covers of Korean songs: "If" by Taeyeon of Girls' Generation and "Don't Forget" by Baek Ji-young. Also includes her cover of Tamia's "Officially Missing You" and "Opposites Attracts" composed by Junjee Marcelo which is also included in her first studio album Now Playing. The songs in the album were all recorded in the Philippines. Meanwhile, Juris is the first Filipino mainstream artist to release an album in South Korea. But before the release of her mini-album in Korea, it would be recalled that her song "Say You Love Me" taken from her former MYMP's album Versions that topped the Korean charts, Cyworld and BGM Charts for three months. In promotion of the album she appeared at the Green Plugged Seoul 2011 Music Festival on May 14, 2011, at the Nanji Hangang Park. Green Plugged Seoul 2011 is a two-day, multi-stage international festival that offers a variety of art performances including concerts, exhibits, plays, dance and other multi-media event with 117 participating artists from all over the world, including Korea, Finland, the United States, the United Kingdom, Japan, Sweden and the Philippines.

In February 2011, with the success of ABS-CBN's variety show ASAP's "Sessionistas" segment, they held a concert entitled ASAP SESSIONISTAS 20.11 at the Araneta Coliseum. In the following month, Juris held her first solo concert entitled "Juris Celebrates" at SM City Davao Cinema 3 in Davao and at the Music Museum respectively. The show is a celebration of Juris’ birthday as well as her first anniversary as a solo artist. On the year, Juris released her second studio album Forevermore. It consists of 13 tracks including an original composition of Juris called "Bliss" and four OPM cover songs including Side A original song "Forevermore". The album was placed number 2 upon release at nationwide sales in Odyssey Music and Videos chart and Astrovision/Astroplus report in the Philippines. It became number 1 after two months. The album won at the 24th Philippine Awit Awards for Album of the Year.

=== 2012–2013: Himig Handog, Dreaming of You, Paskong Puno Ng Kasiyahan ===
In March 2012, Juris held a birthday concert entitled Forevermore: A Birthday Concert with guest Ebe Dancel at the Music Museum. In September, Juris released an international studio album Dreaming of You in Singapore by S2S Pte. Ltd. It contains only 12 English tracks and topped the jazz chart of Singapore's popular music store HMV. Also, made it to the list of top albums in iTunes Thailand and was one of the featured albums in iTunes Asia. In November, Juris released her first all-OPM Christmas album entitled Paskong Puno Ng Kasiyahan. The album features five original tracks, including the carrier single "Paskong Puno Ng Kasiyahan" which was composed by herself. The album also has one cover song, "Sana Ngayong Pasko", written and arranged by Jimmy Borja.

In 2013, Juris participated at Himig Handog, multimedia songwriting and music video competition in the Philippines by interpreting the song "Hanggang Wakas" composed by Soc Villanueva. It eventually finished in second place behind "Anong Nangyari Sa Ating Dalawa" composed by Jovinor Tan and interpreted by Aiza Seguerra. In August, with the success of her first international album, Dreaming of You in Singapore, Juris also released Dreaming of You (PH Deluxe Edition) in the Philippines, it contains 19 tracks that features additional OPM songs including "Hanggang Wakas", mostly TV and movie theme songs sung by Juris.

=== 2014–present ===
In 2014, Juris released a song for the original soundtrack of the Philippine television series Ikaw Lamang and Dyesebel called "Sa Aking Pag-Iisa" and "Puwang Sa Puso" respectively. Later, Juris together with Erik Santos and Richard Poon were special guests to "I Heart You 2", Be Careful with My Heart anniversary thanksgiving concert. In August, Juris participated again at Himig Handog by interpreting the song "Hindi Wala" composed by Nica del Rosario. The song won as the Fifth Best Song in the Himig Handog 2014.

== Discography ==
=== Albums ===
- Now Playing (2010)
- Forevermore (2011)
- Dreaming of You (2012)
- Here's My Heart (2019)

=== Extended plays ===
- If You and Me (2010)
- Paskong Puno ng Kasiyahan (2012)
- "It's the Most Wonderful time of the Year" on Deezer 2019 Big Christmas (2019)

=== Soundtracks ===
2009

- "Love Will Keep Us Together" – George and Cecil (ABS-CBN)
- "Tamis ng Unang Halik" – Katorse (ABS-CBN)
- "Nariyan Ka" – May Bukas Pa (ABS-CBN)
- "I Love You, Goodbye" – I Love You, Goodbye (Star Cinema)

2010

- "'Di Lang Ikaw" – Rubi (ABS-CBN)
- "Kapag Ako Ay Nagmahal" – Magkaribal (ABS-CBN)
- "Sa 'yo Lamang" – Sa 'yo Lamang (Star Cinema)
- "Kailan Kaya" – Down With Love (ABS-CBN)

2011

- "Minsan Lang Kitang Iibigin" – Minsan Lang Kita Iibigin (ABS-CBN)
- "Now That You're Gone" – No Other Woman (Star Cinema and Viva Films)
- "Don't Say Goodbye" – My Neighbor's Wife (Regal Films)

2012

- "Dahil Sa'yo" – E-Boy (ABS-CBN)
- "Kahit Isang Saglit" – Walang Hanggan (ABS-CBN)
- "Akala Mo" – A Beautiful Affair (ABS-CBN)
- "Please Be Careful with My Heart (duet w/ Sam Milby)" – Be Careful with My Heart (ABS-CBN)

2013

- "Sabihin Mo Lang" – Kidlat (TV5)
- "Sa Isip ko" – Ina, Kapatid, Anak (ABS-CBN)
- "Di Ko Inakala" – Must Be Love (Star Cinema)
- "Paano Kita Mapasasalamatan" – Muling Buksan ang Puso (ABS-CBN)
- "Got to Believe in Magic" – Got to Believe (ABS-CBN)

2014

- "Sa Aking Pag-Iisa" – Ikaw Lamang (ABS-CBN)
- "Puwang Sa Puso" – Dyesebel (ABS-CBN)
- "Baby, I Do" – I Do (ABS-CBN)
- "Forevermore" – Forevermore (ABS-CBN)
- "Hey It's Me" – Past Tense (Star Cinema)

2015

- "Tunay na Mahal" – Nasaan Ka Nang Kailangan Kita (ABS-CBN)
- "Panaginip" – Pangako Sa 'Yo (ABS-CBN)
- "I Will Be Here" – A Second Chance (Star Cinema)

2016

- "Nag-Iisa Lang" – Pangako Sa 'Yo (ABS-CBN)
- "Your Love" – Dolce Amore (ABS-CBN)
- "Will You Love Me Tomorrow" – Love Me Tomorrow (Star Cinema)
- "Friend of Mine" – Till I Met You (ABS-CBN)
- "Someday" – The Unmarried Wife (Star Cinema)

2017

- "A Love to Last A Lifetime" – A Love to Last (ABS-CBN)

== Concerts ==
- ASAP SESSIONISTAS 20.11 (2011)
- Juris Celebrates (2011)
- Forevermore: A Birthday Concert (2012)
- I Heart You 2 (2014)
- Medleys of my heart (2017)
- Playlist (2019)
- Juris with The Metro Music Orchestra, 10th anniversary solo career (June 2019)
- Juris with The Metro Music Orchestra, The repeat (Dec 2019)

== Awards ==
- Sept 2010 – Gold Record Award: Juris Now Playing (released Feb 2010)
- June 2011 – Platinum Record Award: Now Playing
- May 2011 – 2nd Tambayan 101 OPM Awards Song of the Year "Di Lang ikaw"
- May 2011 – 2nd Tambayan 101 OPM Awards Female Artist of the Year
- Dec 2011 – Album of the Year: Now Playing, 24th Awit Awards
- March 2012 – Gold Record Award: Juris Forevormore (released Jul 2011)
- Sept 2012 – Female Acoustic Artist of the Year at 4th PMPC Star Awards for Music
- Nov 2017 - Awit Awards Most Downloaded Artist(over-all) and Most Downloaded song (version of "Forevermore")
- Jan 2020 - Acoustic Artist of the Year at 11th PMPC Star Awards for Music
