= Himig Handog =

Philippine songwriting competition

- Genre: Music competition
- Created by: ABS-CBN
- Presented by: Various presenters
- Country of origin: Philippines
- Original languages: English, Filipino
- No. of episodes: 12 contests

Production
- Production location: Metro Manila
- Production company: ABS-CBN Corporation

Original release
- Release: 1 October 2000 – present

Himig Handog (lit. 'Musical Offering') is a songwriting competition in the Philippines, organized annually by ABS-CBN Corporation through its music subsidiary Star Music. First held in 2000, it initially only ran three editions before being revived in 2013 and has since been held every year, with the exception of 2021 through 2024, as a result of the COVID-19 pandemic. Since its revival, it is popularly regarded as "the country's premier songwriting contest" with Pinoy songwriters and composers submitting thousands of original compositions annually, and the country's top singers interpreting the songs in a live event.

Among the notable songs that won the competition include "Titibo-Tibo" written by Libertine Amistoso and performed by Moira dela Torre for the 2017 Himig Handog. The song topped the Philippines Hot 100 chart for two weeks and was nominated for three Awit Awards, winning two, including Best Performance by a Female Recording Artist.

== History ==
Himig Handog was first established in 2000. To date, it only had held five competitions which were in 2000, 2001, 2002, 2003 and in 2013. Each year, the title and theme of the contest changes. In 2000, the contest was titled as Himig Handog sa Bayang Pilipino which was held on October 1. During the second, third and fourth contests' themes and titles were JAM: Makabagong Kabataan, Love Songs and Love Songs 2 respectively.

From 2001 to 2003, only three songs were rewarded with varying amounts of financial incentives(cash prizes) depending on which entry came in first, second, and third. However, in 2013, the amount of incentives given were raised to five to make up a 'Top Five'. Other award categories were also introduced during this year. Also, it introduced a music video contest where participating tertiary institutions across the country were given the challenge of producing and directing the music videos for each song entry under a certain budget.

The inaugural edition of Himig Handog was held on October 1 2000 at Meralco Theater in Pasig City. Earlier editions, including the inaugural, had specified themes which the songs need to conform to. The theme in 2000 was "Himig Handog sa Bayang Pilipino" which meant that submitted songs should be dedicated to Filipino heroes. The second edition was held at the Eugenio Lopez, Jr. Communications Center in Quezon City. The theme for this edition was "JAM: Himig Handog sa Makabagong Kabataan", a tribute to Filipino youth. The third and final edition before the 10-year long hiatus was held at ABS-CBN Studio 10 focusing on love songs.

The theme of the 2013 contest was P-Pop Love Songs: Mga Awit at Kwento ng Pusong Pilipino (lit. P-Pop Love Songs: The Songs and Stories of Filipino Hearts). It was held at the Mall of Asia Arena on February 24, 2013 The competition consists of twelve finalists selected from the 2,500 songs submitted during the auditions.The competition ended with "Anong Nangyari Sa Ating Dalawa" as the first place by Jovinor Tan (interpreted by Aiza Seguerra). Also, on second place was "Hanggang Wakas" by Soc Villanueva (interpreted by Juris Fernandez); third place was "If You Ever Change Your Mind", which was sung and composed Marion Aunor; fourth place was "Scared to Death" by Domingo Rosco Jr. and sung by KZ Tandingan; and fifth place was "Kahit Na" by Julius James de Belen and interpreted by Toni Gonzaga.

Meanwhile, the song "Nasa Iyo na ang Lahat" by Jungee Marcelo which was sung by Daniel Padilla won special awards. These include MOR Listener's Choice, Tambayan 101.9 Listener's Choice, Star Records CD Buyer's Choice and the MYX Choice for Best Video. The competition was judged by Jim Paredes, Louie Ocampo, Olivia Lamasan, August Benitez, Jett Pangan, Freddie Aguilar, Cory Vidanes, Freddie M. Garcia, Jed Madela, Sarah Geronimo and Ogie Alcasid as its chairman. Special guests Anna Fegi, Bituin Escalante, and Martin Nievera performed a Finale production number representing the past winners of the competition.

The 2014 edition of the contest was titled "Himig Handog P-Pop Love Songs" and was held at the Smart Araneta Coliseum on September 28, 2014, where the interpreters performed their songs with an orchestra conducted by Gerard Salonga. The studio versions of the songs were performed by the interpreters live at the morning lifestyle TV show Kris TV and on Sunday noontime variety show ASAP 19 ahead of the grand-finals night.

The Top 15 finalists of the 2016 edition, themed "Himig Handog P-Pop Love Songs" was released on January 13, 2016. The grand finals night was held at the Kia Theatre on April 24, 2016, and aired on ABS-CBN's "Sunday's Best". "Dalawang Letra", a song entry composed by Pinoy Dream Academy alumnus Davey Langit and interpreted by Itchyworms band was named as the grand winner, while the song "O Pag-Ibig", composed by Honlani Rabe and Jack Rufo and interpreted by Ylona Garcia and Bailey May bagged the most number of special awards.

The Top 10 finalists of the Himig Handog 2017 was released on September 10, 2017. The grand finals day was held on ASAP on November 26, 2017, on ABS-CBN. "Titibo-Tibo", a song entry composed by Libertine Amistoso and interpreted by Moira Dela Torre was named as the grand winner, while the song "Tayo na Lang Kasi", composed by Soc Villanueva and interpreted by Kyla and Jason Dy bagged the most number of special awards. The Special Awards recognized selected entries and artists for various distinctions. "Tayo na Lang Kasi," performed by Kyla and Jason Dy, received the MOR 101.9 Choice Award, the One Music Philippines Favorite Interpreter Choice Award, and the MYX Best Music Video Choice Award. "Wow na Feelings," performed by Janella Salvador, was awarded TFC's Global Choice Award. "The Labo Song," performed by Kaye Cal, received the Star Music Choice Award.

The Top 10 finalists of the Himig Handog 2018 was released on September 25, 2018, and on September 26, 2018, they revealed their interpreters. The grand finals day was held on ASAP on November 11, 2018, on ABS-CBN. This was also the last episode of ASAP prior to its reformat into ASAP Natin 'To in the following week after the entry of Regine Velasquez as a main host. Beginning with this edition, competitions between universities and colleges for the best music video production were no longer held.

The Top 12 finalists of the Himig Handog 2019 was released on June 24, 2019, while the interpreters were revealed on July 26, 2019. The grand finals day was held on ASAP Natin 'To on October 13, 2019, on ABS-CBN.

This year, among the 3,000 of compositions submitted, the Top 12 finalists of the Himig Handog 2020 was announced on September 26, 2020, via ABS-CBN social media platforms and the interpreters were revealed on October 24, 2020. The music videos for all songs were released on January 2, 2021. The grand finals night was held on March 21, 2021, at the ABS-CBN Studio 10 (the studio used for ASAP). Because of the restrictions caused by the COVID-19 pandemic in the Philippines, the grand finals night was held without a live audience, and was streamed on KTX.ph with a delayed telecast on Sunday's Best, while the organizers, artists, and crew followed quarantine periods, enforced swab test requirements, maintained distancing protocols and followed all health and safety procedures to ensure their safety and good health.

In September 2022, PhilPop and Himig Handog, renowned entities in the Philippine music industry, collaborated for the biggest songwriting festival in the Philippines. This collaboration followed an open audition where songwriters could submit their released or unreleased songs.

On April 14, 2023, PhilPop and Himig Handog announced the selection of 35 DigiCamp fellows who would take part in the Songwriting Festival. These selected 35 fellows engaged in a 2-month DigiCamp program tailored to enrich their songwriting skills. The DigiCamp curriculum included a well-structured program providing training, guidance, and mentorship to foster the development of their capabilities as songwriters. After the 2-month training, the 35 fellows had to submit their final entries to qualify for the Top 12.

On July 22, 2023, PhilPop and Himig Handog, revealed the Top 12 selected grand finalists who had qualified to progress to the forthcoming competition. The Top 12 entries went through multiple rounds of adjudication, headed by an esteemed panel of board members, producers, key leaders, prominent songwriters, and decision-makers affiliated with PhilPop and Himig Handog.

One year after the announcement of the Top 12, on July 17, 2024, a video uploaded by Star Music PH and Philpop unveiled the names of the interpreters and their respective songs, alongside the composers. The following day, July 18, 2024, marked the highly anticipated grand media launch of Philpop Himig Handog 2024. This event was attended by the interpreters and the Top 12 composers, including notable figures like Ice Seguerra, Moira Dela Torre, Johnoy Danao, Maki, VXON, Khimo Gumatay and several emerging artists from the Philippines.

The Top 12 Philpop Himig Handog songs were released on all digital platforms on July 19, 2024. The official music videos were released on November 8, 2024, on the ABS-CBN Star Music YouTube channel. The Finals Night was held at the New Frontier Theater on March 22, 2025.

== Editions ==
Over the years, Himig Handog has been hosted by a diverse rotation of prominent Filipino actors, television personalities, and musicians.

Year	Grand final date	Venue	Host(s)
2000	October 1	Meralco Theater, Pasig	Pops Fernandez, Cris Villonco, and Mari Kaimo
2001	Unknown	ELJ Communications Center, Quezon City	Ryan Agoncillo, RJ Rosales, Jodi Sta. Maria, and Pops Fernandez
2002	November 10	Studio 10, ABS-CBN Broadcasting Center, Quezon City	Jericho Rosales, Kristine Hermosa, Ryan Agoncillo, and Desiree del Valle
2013	February 24	Mall of Asia Arena, Pasay	Xian Lim, Kim Chiu, Matteo Guidicelli, and Megan Young
2014	September 28	Smart Araneta Coliseum, Quezon City	Kim Chiu, Xian Lim, Alex Gonzaga, and Robi Domingo
2016	April 24	Kia Theatre, Quezon City	Kathryn Bernardo, Enrique Gil, Liza Soberano, and Robi Domingo
2017	November 26	Studio 10, ABS-CBN Broadcasting Center, Quezon City	None; grand finals were held as part of ASAP
2018	November 11	Studio 10, ABS-CBN Broadcasting Center, Quezon City	None; grand finals were held as part of ASAP
2019	October 13	Studio 10, ABS-CBN Broadcasting Center, Quezon City	None; grand finals were held as part of ASAP
2020	March 21	Studio 10, ABS-CBN Broadcasting Center, Quezon City	Jayda, Edward Barber, and Jona
2025	March 22	New Frontier Theater, Quezon City	Karylle

== Winners ==
Himig Handog Grand Winners
Year	Song	Artist(s)	Composer(s)
2000	"Si Ka Bayani"	Gary Granada	Soc Villanueva; Arnel De Pano
2001	"Tara Tena"	Kyla, Kaya and V3	Jonathan Manalo
2002	"Kung Ako Na Lang Sana"	Bituin Escalante	Soc Villanueva
2003	"Kailan Kita Mamahalin"	Anna Fegi	Arnel De Pano
2004–2012	Contest not held		
2013	"Anong Nangyari Sa Ating Dalawa?"	Ice Seguerra	Jovinor Tan
2014	"Mahal Ko O Mahal Ako"	KZ Tandingan	Edwin Marollano
2015	Contest not held		
2016	"Dalawang Letra"	The Itchyworms	Davey Langit
2017	"Titibo-Tibo"	Moira Dela Torre	Libertine Amistoso
2018	"Sa Mga Bituin Na Lang Ibubulong"	JM de Guzman	Kyle Raphael Borbon
2019	"Mabagal"	Daniel Padilla and Moira Dela Torre	Dan Martel Simon Tañedo
2020	"Marupok"	KZ Tandingan	Daniella Ann Balagtas
2021–2024	Contest not held		
2025	"Wag Paglaruan"	Fana ft. Tiara Shaye	Tiara Shaye

== See also ==
- ABS-CBN Corporation
- Star Music
- Original Pilipino Music
- Philippine Popular Music Festival (PhilPop)
