= Davey Langit =

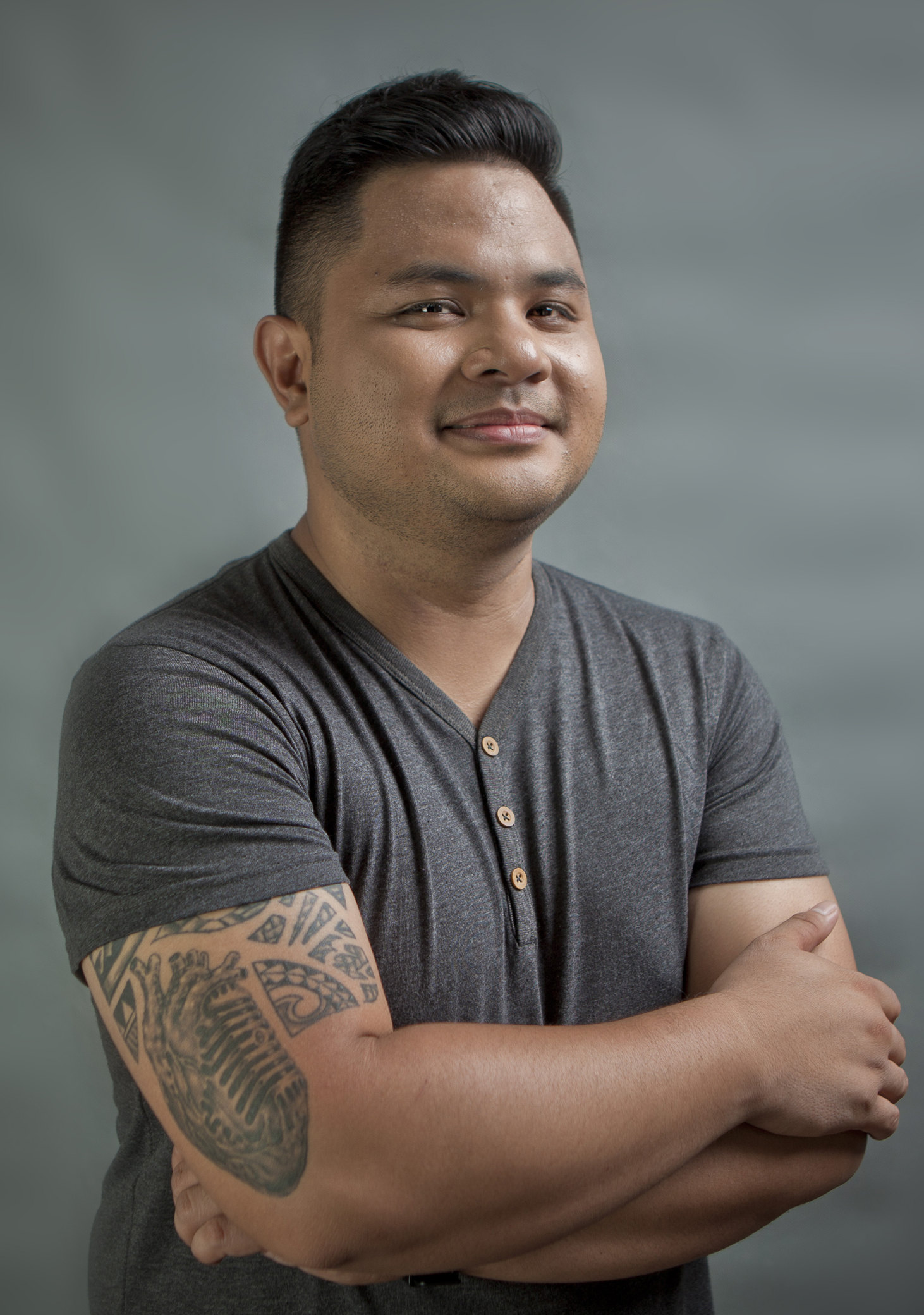
- Langit in 2017

Background information
- Born: Davey Ryan Edward Langit; December 20, 1986
- Died: October 21, 2025 (aged 38)
- Genres: OPM
- Occupations: Singer, songwriter, musician, arranger, radio DJ, television presenter
- Instruments: Vocals, guitar
- Years active: 2006–2025
- Spouse: Therese Villarante

Davey Ryan Edward Langit (Tagalog: [ˈlaŋɪt]; December 20, 1986 – October 21, 2025) was a Filipino singer-songwriter and television personality. Widely acclaimed in the local music scene as one of the most skilled songwriters of his generation. He is known for his songs "Selfie Song" and "Dalawang Letra", interpreted by the Itchyworms, that won Grand Prize on Himig Handog P-Pop Love Songs.

Langit participated in Pinoy Dream Academy's first season (2006) alongside Yeng Constantino, whom he wrote hit songs for. His involvement in the local music scene made him an influence for prominent musical artists in the Philippines mainly because of his passionate storytelling and innate ability to write songs, including Skusta Clee, TJ Monterde and John Roa to name a few.

== Career ==
Langit kicked off his music career during Pinoy Dream Academy's first season (2006). He honed his singing and songwriting prowess during his stint writing songs like Dinggin, Sikat Ako (PDA Album Vol.2 and 4 respectively), Spending My Life With You, Awit Para Sa Kanya and also wrote Yeng Constantino's hits Cool Off and Time In (from the album Salamat). He then merged with fellow scholars to form the short lived Cebalo band which re-arranged and performed Pinoy Ako for PBB's second season.

Langit also wrote songs for the movies Katas Ng Saudi (2007 MMFF – "Sa Aking Pag-Uwi") and Magkaibigan (2008 MMFF – "Kaibigan"). His successive exposure to the gig scene further enhanced his stage play leading to him signing with Viva Records in June 2009 – hence the creation of Mad About Acoustic (2009), Lovex2 (2010 – with Raffi Quijano) and Mad About Acoustic 2; ukulele versions (2011) under the supervision of Sunny Ilacad. Poker Face and Jai Ho are some of the hits he re-created.

He wrote and arranged songs for other artists as well. Langit contributed "You Still Have My Heart" for Princess Velasco's Addicted to Acoustic 2, "Bestfriend" for Yssa Alvarez's Addicted to Acoustic album, and "The Love Song" for their duet album together with Raffi Quijano.

In 2013, the Selfie Song was released on YouTube and created underground noise from the get go. The viral cellphone video caught the attention of the internet which led to a music video collaboration with Jamich. The said song became such a huge hit that it became number one on 22 radio stations here and abroad. This also led to Langit being thrust into the national media spotlight yet again after television, radio social media based guestings, gigs and events went pouring in thereafter. The video now has over 8 million views.

Langit was one of the finalists in the Philippines' biggest songwriting competition, the Philippine Pop Music Festival (Philpop 2014) with his song "NGSB" (No Girlfriend Since Break) interpreted by Luigi D'avola. Later that year, he released The Wedding Song, which was famously known for using the classic wedding march theme on its chorus. The song was then used and performed on various weddings thereafter. The song also has 600,000 views to date.

He was one of the hosts in Net 25's daily morning show, "Pambansang Almusal".

In September 2014, Langit signed with Alcasid Total Entertainment & Artist Management Inc. also known as ATEAM, a new talent management spearheaded by OPM icon, Ogie Alcasid.

He was also a radio jock for Pinas FM, an all-OPM radio station operated by the Eagle Broadcasting Corporation.

Langit, an active member of the Iglesia ni Cristo, hosted the 1st INCinema Excellence in Visual Media Awards (EVM Awards) last October 2013 and the 2nd edition of it as well with Nikki Veron Cruz on October 31, 2014, at the Philippine Arena.

On the 2015 edition of the Philippine Popular Music Festival, Langit grabbed 1st runner up honors for his song "Paratingin Mo Na Siya".

And the following year, his song Dalawang Letra interpreted by the Itchyworms won Grand Prize on Himig Handog P-Pop Love Songs 2016.

A household name on the songwriting and jingle writing circuit, Langit continued to perform all across the country, and was about to release a thirteen cut, all original album that will be distributed by Star Music Inc.

== Death ==
Langit died on October 21, 2025, at the age of 38 due to spondylodiscitis, a rare spinal infection.

== Singles ==
Year	Title	Artist
2017	Idjay	Davey Langit ft. Michelle Dy
2017	Breaksary	Davey Langit
2016	Dalawang Letra	Davey Langit ft. Itchyworms
2015	Paratingin Mo na Siya	Davey Langit ft. Luigi D' Avola
2014	Wedding Song	Davey Langit
2013	Selfie Song	Davey Langit
2007	Time In	Davey Langit ft. Yeng Constantino
2007	Cool Off	Davey Langit ft. Yeng Constantino
