= Johnoy Danao =

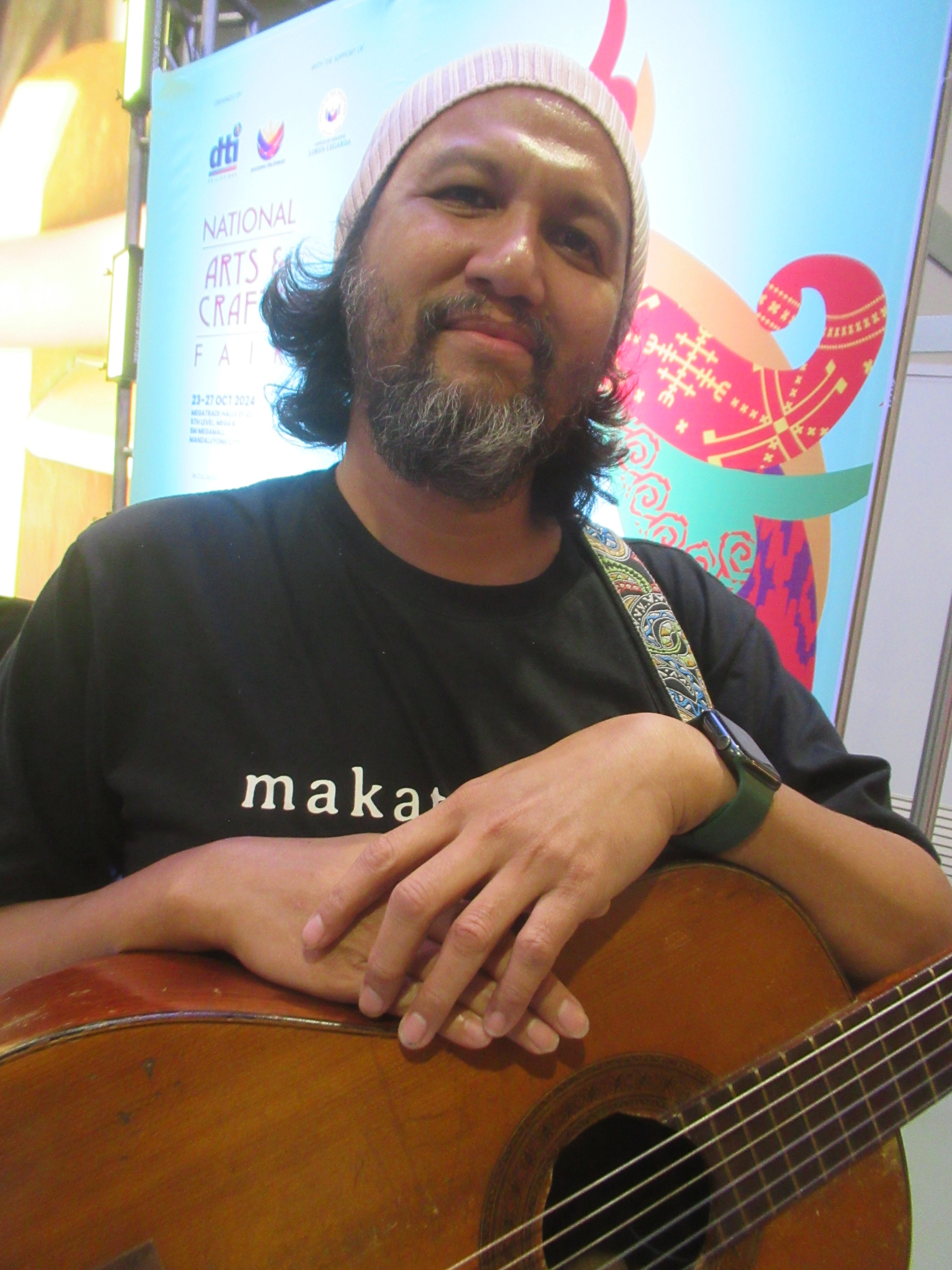

Background information
- Genre: Filipino Contemporary Music

Johnoy Danao is a Filipino independent musician, composer, and singer-songwriter. Although best known as a live acoustic performer, his two albums, Dapithapon and Samo't Sari, also garnered significant album sales and radio airplay. Among his best-known artistic collaborations are with director Jerrold Tarog, for the soundtrack of the 2010 film Senior Year, and with guitarist Kakoy Legaspi in a series of concerts in 2007. A yearlong concert series with Ebe Dancel and Bullet Dumas culminated in a joint concert performance at the Music Museum in San Juan in February 2016.
