= Love team =

Actor and actress depicted to the public as a romantic couple

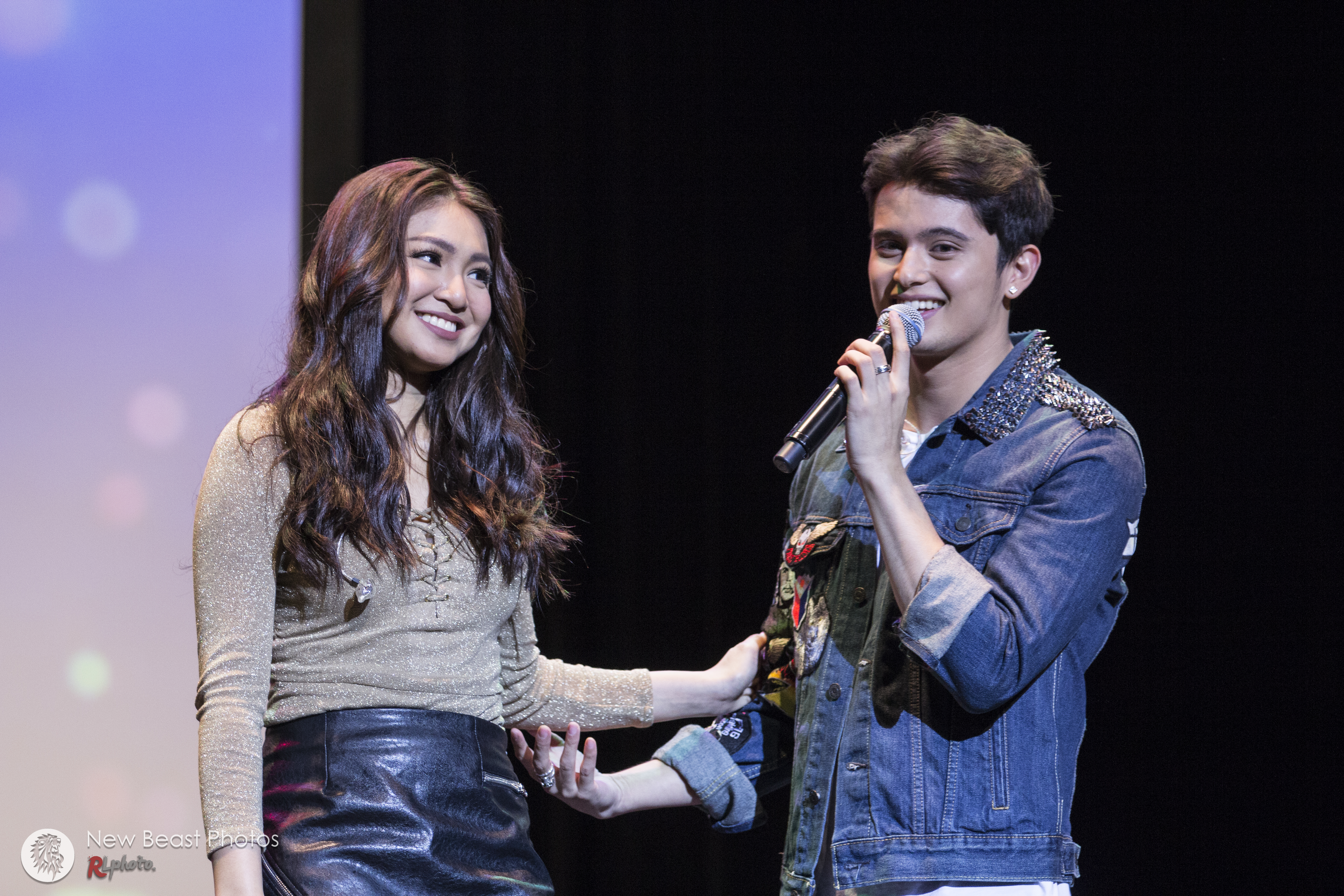
The Filipino on-screen couple "JaDine", formed by James Reid (right) and Nadine Lustre (left), who were a romantic couple in real life, is an example of a love team.

Love team (sometimes stylized as loveteam) is a term in Philippine media referring to an onscreen romantic pairing of two actors who are regularly cast together in film, television, or other media. These pairings often gain devoted fan followings and can significantly influence the careers of the actors involved. Love teams are frequently promoted as real or potential real-life couples, and are often branded with portmanteau names—such as “KathNiel” (Kathryn Bernardo and Daniel Padilla) or “LizQuen” (Liza Soberano and Enrique Gil).

The practice originated in early Philippine cinema and has since become a defining feature of local pop culture, especially within romantic genres. While credited for boosting commercial success in the industry, love teams have also drawn criticism for pressuring actors to maintain a romantic image off-screen and for making it difficult to take on roles outside their pairing.

== Overview ==
In Philippine media, a "love team" refers to a pairing of two actors—usually a man and a woman—who are consistently featured together in television shows, films, or commercials. This practice, which traces its roots back to the 1920s, has become a staple in the country’s contemporary entertainment industry.

While these pairings started as a way to showcase fictional love stories, the dynamics around them have changed significantly over time. In the 2000s, the impact of love teams on actors' careers intensified. Becoming part of a successful love team often propelled an actor into superstardom, with exclusive pairings in major TV series and films becoming the norm. However, this exclusivity sometimes limited actors’ opportunities to work with other artists, as fiercely loyal fan bases could dictate the direction of their careers.

The role of fans has also grown in prominence, as the idea of a "real-life romance" between love team members began to take hold. In some cases, fans not only supported their favorite pairings on-screen but also pushed for those couples to be romantically involved in real life. This expectation can sometimes lead to pressure on the actors involved, as seen in the case of Kathryn Bernardo and Daniel Padilla (KathNiel), whose professional separation in 2019 highlighted the impact of fan expectations on the personal and professional lives of love team members.

As time went on, however, love teams became more flexible. While the traditional formula of romantic on-screen couples matching real-life relationships still exists, the modern love team dynamic has shifted to include non-romantic pairings. Actors like Richard Yap and Jodi Sta. Maria and Ruru Madrid and Shaira Diaz have found success as love teams despite not having romantic relationships off-screen. This reflects a broader trend in contemporary Filipino media, where love teams can maintain their popularity and fan support while exploring a wider range of on-screen partnerships.

== History ==
=== Early years (1920s-1940s) ===
The concept of love teams in Philippine cinema can be traced back to the 1920s, with the pairing of Gregorio Fernandez and Mary Walter—who starred together in silent films—considered a precursor to the modern love team phenomenon. Director José Nepomuceno is credited with popularizing this concept through Ang Huling Simbahan, which starred both Fernandez and Walter.

The 1940s saw the rise of the love team of Fernando Poe Sr. and Lucita Goyena, who were hailed as the “King and Queen of Philippine Movies.” During this period, the pairing of Rogelio dela Rosa and Carmen Rosales also gained widespread popularity. Known affectionately by fans as “Mameng and Roger,” they became one of the most beloved tandems of the decade. In addition to their popularity as a love team, Rosales became the highest-paid movie star in 1949 when she was offered an unprecedented sum to reunite with dela Rosa in Kampanang Ginto.

=== Post-war (1950s-1970s) ===
During the post-war era, the Philippine film industry was dominated by major studios such as LVN Pictures, Sampaguita Pictures, and Premiere Productions, which strategically developed and promoted love teams as part of their star system to attract audiences.

The 1950s saw the formation of the tandem Nida Blanca and Nestor de Villa, whose popularity significantly contributed to LVN Pictures’ box-office success. The two later co-hosted The Nida-Nestor Show, a variety program broadcast by ABS-CBN. The era also saw the rise of the love team Delia Razon and Mario Montenegro, who gained significant popularity during this period. The late 1950s also introduced the pairing of Gloria Romero and Luis Gonzales. In the 1960s, Sampaguita Pictures introduced the tandem of Eddie Gutierrez and Susan Roces, whose collaborations became major box-office successes, solidifying their status as one of the iconic love teams of the era.

Other notable love teams emerged in the 1960s and 1970s, including Tirso Cruz III and Nora Aunor, popularly known as "Guy and Pip." The pair first appeared together in the film D' Musical Teenage Idols! and went on to dominate the box office throughout the 1970s. Meanwhile, the Vi & Bot tandem of Vilma Santos and Edgar Mortiz also rose to prominence in the 1970s, with their film Young Love (1970). Their love team was officially introduced in the TV series, D’ Sensations (1971).

=== Classic love teams (1980s-early 2000s) ===
During the 1980s, iconic Filipino love teams like Gabby Concepcion and Sharon Cuneta achieved mass appeal. They debuted as a tandem in the romantic film, Dear Heart (1981), which achieved commercial success. This era also introduced the on-screen partnership of Maricel Soriano and William Martinez, who first headlined the film Oh My MamA (1981). The two were eventually dubbed Regal Entertainment's most popular love team during that time.

The team-up of Richard Gomez and Dawn Zulueta also became a fan favorite during this period, particularly with the romantic drama Hihintayin Kita sa Langit (1991). Their pairing, collectively called "CharDawn", has since been fondly dubbed by fans as the "eternal love team."

These pairings continued into the 1990s with the rise of Rico Yan and Claudine Barretto, whose on-screen chemistry led to the formation of the love team name "RYCB". They starred in hit projects like the TV series Mula sa Puso (1997-1999) and films Dahil Mahal na Mahal Kita (1998) and Got 2 Believe (2002). Similarly, the love team of Marvin Agustin and Jolina Magdangal, known as "MarJo", gained significant popularity in the same period, with films such as Labs Kita… Okey Ka Lang? (1998) adding to their cultural impact.

By the 2000s, John Lloyd Cruz and Bea Alonzo became one of the most beloved duos of the era, becoming mainstays in Filipino entertainment. They are best known for their iconic roles as Popoy (Cruz) and Basha (Alonzo) in the romantic film classic One More Chance (2007). The pair went on to star in several box office hits, including Close to You (2006) and Miss You Like Crazy (2010), among others.

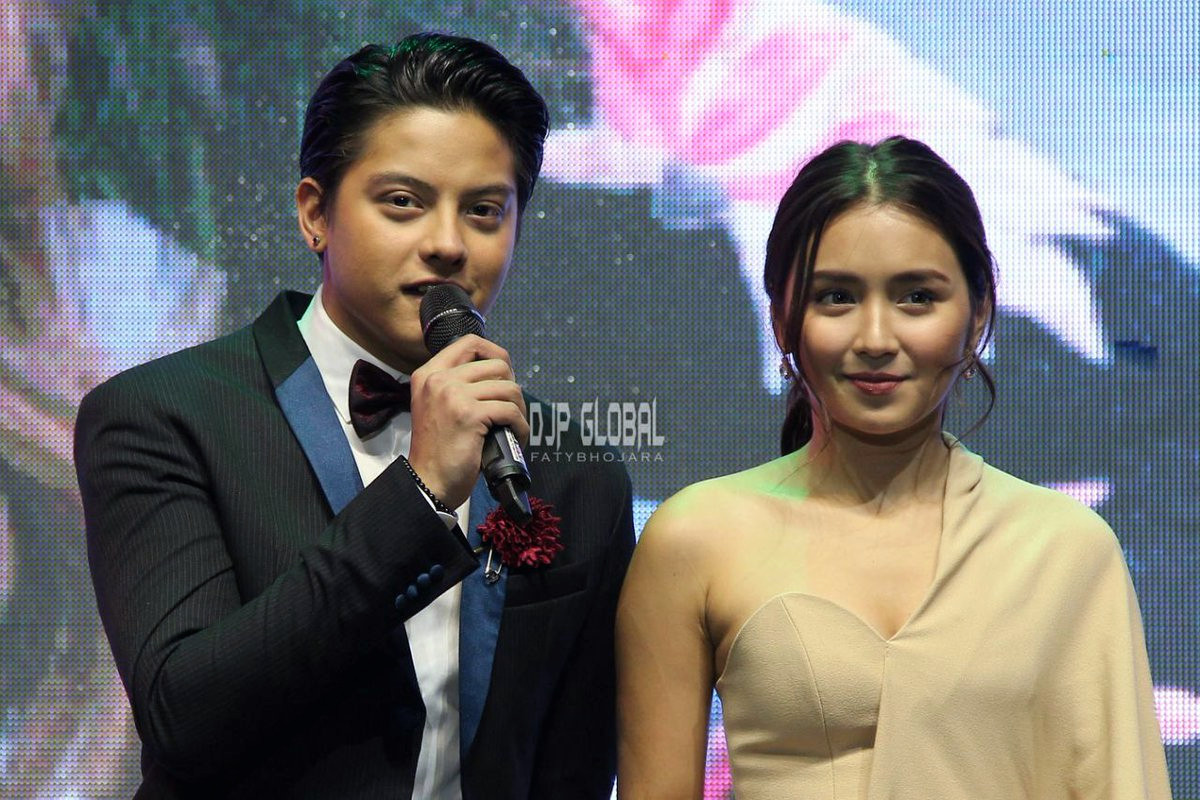
Kathryn Bernardo and Daniel Padilla, collectively known as the love team "KathNiel", in 2016.

=== Modern love teams (2010s-present) ===
Entering the 21st century, the concept of love teams evolved with the emergence of portmanteau names—combining the names of the actors to create a unique, marketable identity for the duo. For example, the popular tandem of KathNiel became a cultural staple.

The impact of love teams on careers intensified in the 2000s, with new dynamics emerging. Becoming part of a love team could significantly boost an actor’s visibility and career prospects, often resulting in exclusive pairings for TV series and films. However, this exclusivity can sometimes limit the actors’ opportunities to collaborate with other artists, especially when fan bases become fiercely protective of the pairings.

This period also saw the commercialization of love teams through endorsements and brand partnerships. A love team’s reach was no longer limited to TV shows and films; their faces graced advertisements, fast food chains, product lines, and even music videos, significantly expanding their influence across different industries. The commercial value of love teams became evident as they began to be used to promote everything from beauty products to mobile networks, further cementing their weight in Filipino pop culture.

== Reception ==
=== Within the entertainment industry ===
Actress Solenn Heussaff, after conversing with people she knows are involved in love teams, said that being in such a pairing is difficult. She remarked that the love teams may "lose a sense of who they are" by trying too hard to portray themselves as romantic couples both on-screen and in real life, which she says is not good if it is forced in the case of the latter. She also points out that love team fans may be limiting the career options of actors involved in a pairing "knowingly or unknowingly." Heussaff states that if an actor or actress gets an assignment for a film or television series where they pair with an actor or actress other than each other as their love interest, "someone gets attacked." But she was quick to add that love teams could be beneficial. Sometimes, those involved in such pairing became romantic couples in reality and urged fans to respect the individuality of the actors and actresses.

Nadine Lustre, part of the highly regarded love team JaDine, admitted that rumors involving James Reid and Julia Barretto (who was paired with another actor, Iñigo Pascual, at the time) during the filming of Para sa Hopeless Romantic (2015) affected them. In particular, Reid faced criticism over the rumors, which led to him expressing discomfort in later interviews about working with Barretto again, citing the tensions created by the earlier controversy.

In 2023, Liza Soberano, part of the popular local love team LizQuen with Enrique Gil, shared her thoughts on the challenges of being in a showbiz love team. While she initially didn’t view it as a problem, she later realized the limitations it placed on her career. Soberano also opened up about the pressures of maintaining the illusion of a real-life relationship, both on and off-screen. “In love teams, you're expected to just be with that one person throughout your career and in your personal life,” she said. She explained that the industry encourages keeping relationships ambiguous to keep fans engaged. "You're not allowed to say that you are dating because you want to keep the fans hungry." Soberano highlighted that love teams have been a staple in Philippine entertainment since the '70s or '80s, with many stars’ careers often dependent on their involvement in such pairings.

Soberano's statements sparked heated debates online, with many criticizing her for being "ungrateful" about the success that came with being in a love team. Veteran actress Dolly de Leon came to Soberano's defense, saying the actress "deserves to speak her truth.” In later interviews, Soberano clarified that she's not dismissing the good experience she got from her love team. In contrast, Will Ashley expressed that he doesn't believe love teams significantly contribute to boosting one's fame, although he is open to the idea of working in one, despite preferring to pursue a solo career.

Alden Richards shared in a 2024 interview that love teams have long been a part of Philippine culture, and he believes actors should be grateful for the support they receive from being part of one. Sharon Cuneta echoed Richards’ sentiments, encouraging Filipinos to accept and take pride in the love team culture.

Kim Chiu, who has been part of the popular tandems KimErald (with Gerald Anderson) and KimXi (with Xian Lim), affirmed the view that successful love teams can accelerate an actor’s career, attributing this to strong fan support. Chiu noted that being in a love team can be enjoyable, and acknowledged the growing public acceptance that not all on-screen partnerships are expected to lead to real-life relationships, a shift from previous expectations.

=== Criticism ===
Love teams have been criticized for promoting heteronormativity and upholding the heteropatriarchy. They are also criticized for fostering parasocial relationships, where fans develop one-sided emotional bonds with on-screen pairings, leading to unrealistic expectations and pressures on the actors involved.

== Notable examples ==
Pairing	Notes
Nora Aunor and Tirso Cruz III (Guy and Pip)	Main article: Guy and Pip A love team which was popular in the 1970s. The couple were known as Guy and Pip, the former referring to Aunor and the latter to Cruz. The two first starred together in the 1969 feature 9 Teeners' at 'Yeye Generation!. As Guy and Pip, they also released music albums. They often featured in films until 1978 when both starred in Mahal Mo, Mahal Ko. The two had a comeback in the 1985 film Till We Meet Again and featured in movies once again until 1993 when both were part of the 1993 Metro Manila Film Festival entry Inay. They briefly returned in the 2010s, when they starred in the 2014 made for television film When I Fall In Love. Cruz married Lynn Ynchausti in the 1980s.
Gabby Concepcion and Sharon Cuneta (ShaGab)	The two first starred in a film together in 1981 in Dear Heart which marked Cuneta's debut as a main film actress. The two who were dubbed as a "super couple" starred in several other films. Cuneta and Concepcion got married in 1984 and they had a daughter. Their short-lived marriage was later annulled and they both remarried.
Gerald Anderson and Kim Chiu (KimErald)	The pairing was conceived in 2006, when both entered as "housemates" in the reality television show Pinoy Big Brother: Teen Edition. After their exit from the competition, both started their acting careers. Anderson and Chiu appeared together as a love team in five television series and six films.
Dingdong Dantes and Marian Rivera (DongYan)	This initially on-screen pairing began with Marimar, the 2007 Philippine television adaptation of the Mexican telenovela of the same name. And after Marimar skyrocketed in popularity and launched Rivera's career, so too did her pairing with Dantes. It was immediately followed with Dyesebel, as well as movie projects such as You to Me Are Everything. In 2014, after being in a long-term relationship, Rivera and Dantes tied the knot in the Immaculate Conception Cathedral, Cubao, Quezon City, and was televised on GMA and titled as "The Royal Wedding". The couple currently has two children: Maria Letizia (born in 2015), and Jose Sixto IV (born in 2019).
Richard Yap and Jodi Sta. Maria	The love team of Richard Yap and Jodi Sta. Maria became best known for Be Careful with My Heart. The two were known by the names of their characters: "Sir Chief" and "Maya" for Yap and Sta. Maria respectively. The two are not in a romantic relationship with each other. Yap is already married to another woman with whom he has three children. Sta. Maria on her part has a child with Pampi Lacson, her former husband.
Kathryn Bernardo and Daniel Padilla (KathNiel)	Main article: KathNiel KathNiel was first featured in television on a teleserye called Growing Up in 2011. Bernardo and Padilla first publicly confirmed that they are in a relationship in April 2018. The couple has starred in other television series such as Princess and I, Pangako Sa 'Yo and La Luna Sangre and in feature films such as She's Dating the Gangster, Barcelona: A Love Untold, and The Hows of Us.
Liza Soberano and Enrique Gil (LizQuen)	LizQuen starred together as best friends in the film She's the One (2013). They were then cast as the lead characters in the top-rating romantic drama series Forevermore (2014–2015). Following its success and their tandem, dubbed as 2015's breakout love team, they both starred in a string of projects together such as hit movies Just The Way You Are (2015), Everyday I Love You (2015), My Ex and Whys (2017), and Alone/Together (2019); and television series Dolce Amore (2016), Bagani (2018), and Make It with You (2020). Soberano and Gil first publicly confirmed that they are in a relationship in 2019.
Alden Richards and Maine Mendoza (AlDub)	Main article: AlDub The pairing of Richards and Mendoza was popularized in 2015 for their role in Kalyeserye, a segment of the noon-time variety television show Eat Bulaga! where they portrayed a fictionalized version of themselves. In late-2017, Mendoza clarified to AlDub fans that she and Richards are just friends in real life asking for more freedom in her individual career but nevertheless thanked AlDub fans for their support.
Donny Pangilinan and Belle Mariano (DonBelle)	Panglinan and Mariano's love team made its "official" debut in the 2021 TV series He's Into Her, although a following of the pairing has been noted to exist prior to the series' premiere. The pair also starred in the films Love Is Color Blind and An Inconvenient Love. Currently, they are seen in the TV series Can't Buy Me Love (2023).
KD Estrada and Alexa Ilacad (KDLex)	Prior to the pair becoming a love team, Estrada and Ilacad were housemates of Pinoy Big Brother: Kumunity Season 10 - Celebrity Edition where they gained a strong following while being inside the house and after being both evicted on the same night, notably at a time where Ilacad consoled Estrada after an emotional and heartbreaking moment when their fellow housemate Anji Salvacion rejected Estrada and did not reciprocate his romantic feelings for her. In early 2022, after their time in the Big Brother house, the pair had worked together as they released their first two singles Misteryo and their PBB original creation When I See You Again, their first online concert together, and will star in an upcoming iWantTFC series Run To Me.
Ruru Madrid and Shaira Diaz	Noted to be not an off-screen couple. Madrid is dating Bianca Umali while Diaz has been in a relationship with Edgar Allan Guzman.
Mura and Mahal	Both noted to have dwarfism, the two are often considered as a love team. Initially, Mura featured in MTB as Abby or Mahal's "twin" but the two later became known as a love team.

== In popular culture ==
- The Itchyworms recorded the song "Loveteam", written from the point of view of a person with an unrequited love from the other screen partner. The music video of the song starred the love team of Kim Chiu and Gerald Anderson, known as Kimerald (or KimErald)
- The hit song "Dati" by Sam Concepcion and Tippy Dos Santos references the MarJo tandem of Marvin Agustin and Jolina Magdangal. The pair is also referenced in "RomCom" by Rob Deniel.
- The line "I-Dawn Zulueta mo ako" (transl. "Treat me like Dawn Zulueta"), coined by showbiz personality Vice Ganda, has gone viral and become a staple in Philippine pop lingo. The phrase references the iconic scene from the movie Hihintayin Kita sa Langit, where Richard Gomez effortlessly lifts and twirls Dawn Zulueta.
- In 2015, Maine Mendoza's unscripted reaction to Alden Richards' reveal during Eat Bulaga's Juan for All, All for Juan segment led to the birth of the AlDub love team. The phenomenon, dubbed "AlDub Fever", gained massive popularity, with Bryan White's "God Gave Me You" becoming their unofficial theme song. The love team's fanbase, Aldub Nation, became known for their activities for the love team, often holding candles and singing "If We Hold on Together", a moment that has since become a staple meme in Filipino pop culture. The love team also spawned the "pabebe" wave, popularized by Mendoza's viral "pabebe wave" gesture, further cementing their influence in Filipino internet culture.
- Will Ashley and Bianca de Vera, a former love team from the collaboration show Unbreak My Heart (although unofficial during their Pinoy Big Brother stint), inspired the song "Ikaw, Ikaw, Ikaw" by Eliza Maturan and Singaporean artist Icebox.

== See also ==
- Supercouple
- Shipping (fandom)
