= Jadine =

Jadine is a female given name and can refer to:

- Jadine Childs, protagonist of Toni Morrison's Tar Baby (novel)
- Jadine Nollan, member of the Oklahoma House of Representatives
- JaDine, portmanteau of the Filipino love team James Reid and Nadine Lustre

== See also ==
- Jade
