= Iovan =

Iovan is a Romanian surname. Notable people with the surname include:

- Kayla Meagan Iovan (born 1990), Canadian singer and actress
- Sonia Iovan (born 1935), Romanian artistic gymnast
- Ştefan Iovan (born 1960), Romanian footballer and manager
