= List of E-Boy episodes =

E-Boy is a 2012 Philippine fantasy science fiction television drama series directed by FM Reyes and Nick Olanka. The series stars Bugoy Cariño in the title role, with an ensemble cast consisting of Andrea Brillantes, Ariel Rivera, Agot Isidro, Jomari Yllana, Maliksi Morales, Deydey Amansec, Arjo Atayde, Akiko Solon, Bryan Santos, Jaime Fabregas, Pen Medina, Chinggoy Alonzo, and Carme Sanchez, with Valerie Concepcion, Crispin Pineda, Tommy Abuel, Gerald Pesigan, Izzy Canillo, Barbie Sabino, Phytos Kyriacou, and Paolo Serrano in their supporting roles. The series premiered on ABS-CBN's Primetime Bida nighttime block from January 30 to April 13, 2012, replacing Ikaw ay Pag-Ibig.

== Series overview ==
Year	Episode numbers	Episodes	First aired	Last aired
2012	1–53	53	January 30, 2012	April 13, 2012

== Episodes ==
=== 2012 ===
No.	Title	Original release date
1	"A Very Ambitious Father Neglects His Son"	January 30, 2012
The story begins with a day in the life of young Gabriel, the brilliant inventor of Alpha Bot-A prototype robot made from spare parts and electronic scraps. Working tirelessly, Gabriel finally presents Alpha Bot to a Science Fair where he is re-united with his estranged father (and also once notable inventor), Alberto Villareal.
2	"Gabriel Prepares for His Presentation"	January 31, 2012
Gabriel moves into the Villareal mansion after his father agrees to fund Alpha Bot as a final attempt to save his sinking company. He also meets his half-brother Miguel, who did not take Gabriel's presence too warmly at first. Will this be Gabriel's chance of re-building a new family after his mother's untimely death?
3	"Gabriel's Failed Invention Cause Devastation in the Family"	February 1, 2012
Alpha Bot stirs a disaster after a malfunction. Ignited conflicts between Alberto Villareal, Miguel, and Gabriel caused the family to live separate lives. The story progresses into the present time where Gabriel is now married to Ria and blessed with two kids. Gabriel still however keeps his hopes up in patching things up with Miguel and their father.
4	"Miguel Returns to Gabriel and Ria's Life"	February 2, 2012
Gabriel revives Alpha Bot for Miyo and Adrian to play with. Miguel finally visits Gabriel and Ria. But has time really healed all wounds?
5	"E-Boy Changes for the Better"	February 3, 2012
Miguel encourages Gabriel to revive the Alpha Bot project in an effort to help him reconcile with Alberto. Congressman Mariano agrees to fund the project but Miguel intends to use the fund for personal use.
6	"Miyo Runs Away from His Family"	February 6, 2012
After finding out Miguel's plan, Gabriel pulls out from the Alpha Bot project and plans to expose Congressman Mariano's corrupt ways. As a last effort, Miguel hires a hit man to silence Gabriel. In an unfortunate turn of events, an accident caused the tragic death of Ria while Adrian is sent into critical condition.
7	"How Can Gabriel Save Adrian"	February 7, 2012
Gabriel briefly talks to Adrian through E-Boy. After Adrian's death, Gabriel learns that a foul play was behind the tragic accident leaving him to suspect Congressman Mariano.
8	"Gabriel's Family Finds It Hard to Move on from the Accident"	February 8, 2012
Gabriel confronts Congressman Mariano about Ria and Adrian's death. Denying the accusations, the Congressman did not reveal that it was actually Miguel's doing. Miyo believes that his Kuya Adrian now lives through E-Boy. Has E-Boy really turned alive or is it just Miyo's imagination?
9	"Miyo Wants to Prove Eboy's Capabilities"	February 9, 2012
Gabriel, Miyo, Aling Delia, Mang Rutherford and E-Boy spend the day at the park. Miyo was so happy that day and Gabriel is glad he is able to make his son smile again. Miguel visits his brother and he learns Gabriel plans to expose Cong. Mariano's corrupt ways with the help of Cong. Vargas. Gabriel is surprised when Miguel says he supports his decision. Gabriel later gets a call from their father, who says he must stop his brother from taking justice into his own hands. Miyo gets frustrated at E-Boy, for the robot has become unresponsive towards him. He threatens to hose the robot with water if it doesn't talk to him again.
10	"E-Boy Tries to Save Miyo"	February 10, 2012
Gabriel was able to get to Miguel in time to stop him from shooting Congressman Mariano at an awarding ceremony. Congressman Mariano instructs his men to teach Gabriel a lesson so he will learn not to mess with someone like him. E-Boy tries to scare Congressman Mariano's men by pretending to be a ghost but they succeed in setting fire to Gabriel's home. Miyo, E-Boy, Mang Rutherford and Aling Delia try to douse the fire by themselves and soon neighbors hear their pleas of help. Gabriel sends Miyo to Mang Rutherford's province to protect him from Congressman Mariano. However, Miyo gets kidnapped when Gabriel and Miguel push through with their press conference with Congressman. Vargas. Gabriel gets a call from the Congressman Mariano telling him to stop the conference or else his son will suffer the consequence.
11	"E-Boy Longs for His Family"	February 13, 2012
12	"E-Boy Receives Great Power Which Helps Him Save Miyo"	February 14, 2012
Miyo in his haste to help E-Boy, goes over the ravine and delicately hangs over the edge. Mariano tells Miguel they can have a business deal after explaining how the robot works as he has witnessed it. A struggle for the gun ensues between the two but Miguel ends up killing the politician. Rain starts to pour making it difficult for the police and Gabriel to find Miyo. Lightning strikes E-boy, waking him up long enough to save Miyo. Gabriel finds Miyo and E-Boy lying side by side in the mud but he takes his son first to the hospital before doing anything about the robot. Miyo wakes up later at the hospital and becomes hysterical when he learns E-Boy is missing.
13	"Can E-Boy Find His Way Back Home?"	February 15, 2012
Miyo prays for a star to guide E-Boy back home. Gabriel is surprised when he opens the door the next evening to find a disheveled robot standing in front of him. Gabriel asks Mang Rutherford and Aling Delia what happened on the night of the kidnapping and how E-Boy rescued them. The police questions Gabriel to find out if he is involved in Congressman Mariano's murder. Miyo is happy to have the robot back and helps his father in fixing E-Boy.
14	"Gabriel Tells Miyo That E-Boy Can Never Be His Kuya Adrian"	February 16, 2012
The man electrocuted by E-Boy is sent to a psychological institution after he kept on insisting about a robot murderer and how it will rule the world. The press then hounds Gabriel, who tells Miyo to keep E-Boy's powers a secret for people will take the robot away once they learn what it can do. However, Miyo can't help himself from telling the story of E-Boy to his classmates. Ramboy, a school bully, accuses Miyo of lying in front of his classmates just because he's getting much attention.
15	"Miyo Brings E-Boy to School"	February 17, 2012
Alfredo talks to his son Gabriel about his brother, who is acting very strange and secretive the past few weeks. After talking to their family lawyer, Gabriel confronts Miguel about his actions and his brother admits to killing Congressman Mariano. Miyo brings E-Boy to school to prove he is not lying. However, a classmate videoed E-Boy defending Miyo from Ramboy and uploads it on the internet. Soon, people were hounding Miyo and the robot that he had to take refuge at a police station to call Gabriel. News about the robot soon spread even on TV, that Gabriel called their lawyer to help him with the situation. Miyo didn't know about the gravity of his actions and Gabriel let him know that getting revenge on another person isn't a good thing.
16	"E-Boy Starts to Get a Lot of Attention from the People Around Him"	February 20, 2012
Miyo gets unjustly expelled from school because of the incident. A mob goes to Gabriel's home and demands he surrender the dangerous robot to them. Miyo escapes with E-Boy through the back door and calls Miguel for help. While hiding at a nearby park, Miyo gets into a street kid named Princess, who incidentally is the foster child of Tang, Miguel's hitman. Gabriel decides to move out of their home to protect Miyo. Ella, Mang Rutherford and Aling Delia's daughter helps them find a new home to live in. Gabriel tries to consult Atty. Vergara regarding Miguel's case but their talk was interrupted when his brother suddenly appears at the lawyer's office.
17	"How Can E-Boy Seal His Robotic Identity?"	February 21, 2012
Miguel feels Gabriel wants him to go to jail by consulting with their lawyer about Congressman Mariano's death. Gabriel tries to protect Miyo from Miguel and people like the ones who caused them trouble by giving E-Boy human looking skin and features so he can look like a real kid. Ella is assigned to think of a backstory for E-Boy and how he has become an adopted son of the family. Princess finds out Miyo is their neighbor and when she tries to fight with him, part of E-Boy's skin peels off revealing he is a robot. Miyo lies to his father about other people seeing E-Boy in this condition. Miguel visits someone at a clinic and the person turns out to be Ria, who's still in a state of shock. Apparently, Miguel was able to get Ria to a small clinic where he is paying the doctor to treat Ria and keep his secret.
18	"Princess Believes That the Robot She Saw Is Not Good for the Community"	February 22, 2012
Princess goes to the Barangay Chairman to file a complaint against Miyo and his bad robot. Her older brother Jepoy apologizes to Gabriel and his family on behalf of his sister and drags her away. E-Boy feels sad for being a burden to Gabriel's family and Miyo suggests praying to Jesus so he can become a real boy. E-Boy figures Princess will be good to him and Miyo by returning her doll. Tatang opens the door when the two kids drop by and E-Boy recalls from Adrian's memory the image of the hitman at the scene of the accident.
19	"E-Boy Wants to Know the Truth Behind Tang"	February 23, 2012
E-Boy and Miyo run away but both decide to follow Tatang to investigate on the matter. Tatang discovers them following him and tells them to leave him alone. The two lose sight of Tatang but eventually finds him in a pool hall talking to Miguel. Miyo is puzzled why his uncle knows this man. They overhear them talking about a woman and E-Boy says they must learn more about the matter. Ella finds out the boys are missing from the house and Mang Rutherford tries to contact Gabriel. However, Gabriel is arrested by the police for allegedly being Congressman Mariano's killer.
20	"Gabriel Pays for Someone Else's Crime"	February 24, 2012
Ella goes over to Jepoy's home to ask if his sister Princess has seen Miyo and 'Rap-Rap' or E-Boy. When Princess learns that Tatang has seen them in another barangay, she takes her brother Vance with her to look for the two boys. She rescues them from bullies and both parties call a truce. Tatang contacts Miguel and says he should stop exposing their crimes after he discovers Gabriel is in jail. Miguel on the other hand tries to put the blame of the politician's death on his brother by leaving the gun he used inside the house. However, E-Boy sees him inside Gabriel's room.
21	"E-Boy Stumbles on a Very Important Evidence"	February 27, 2012
E-Boy discovers that Miguel left a gun inside Gabriel's closet. He tells Miyo about it and as they discuss on what to do with the gun, the police arrive looking for it. In panic, Miyo drops the gun inside a can of paint and E-Boy gets it out using his abilities without the authorities noticing. The two kids plan to return the gun to Miguel but they get stopped by Princess and Vance, who try to get the gun as payment for their troubles the previous evening. E-Boy uses his magnet-like powers when Princess tries to throw the gun in the sewer.
22	"E-Boy and Miyo Believes That They Must Return the Gun to Miguel"	February 28, 2012
Miyo and E-Boy manage to take the gun again but as they try to hide from Princess and Vance, they run into drunkards who forcefully get the weapon from them. When Tatang learns of Miyo's predicament, he tells Princess and Vance to convince the boys to surrender the gun to him and he will be the one to return it to Miguel. Vance finds Miyo and E-Boy and helps them recover the gun from the drunkards. However, they decide to ask their barangay chairman for help in delivering the gun to Miguel's home. Meanwhile Atty. Vergara was able to convince Gabriel to confess what he know about the case. Alfredo backs up Gabriel's statement, as he feels Miguel is a lost cause. Soon Miguel is served a search warrant and the pink gun was found on a chair inside the mansion.
23	"E-Boy Looks Into Carla's Past"	February 29, 2012
Miyo and E-Boy manage to take the gun again but as they try to hide from Princess and Vance, they run into drunkards who forcefully get the weapon from them. When Tatang learns of Miyo's predicament, he tells Princess and Vance to convince the boys to surrender the gun to him and he will be the one to return it to Miguel. Vance finds Miyo and E-Boy and helps them recover the gun from the drunkards. However, they decide to ask their barangay chairman for help in delivering the gun to Miguel's home. Meanwhile Atty. Vergara was able to convince Gabriel to confess what he know about the case. Alfredo backs up Gabriel's statement, as he feels Miguel is a lost cause. Soon Miguel is served a search warrant and the pink gun was found on a chair inside the mansion.
24	"E-Boy Learns How to Read Minds"	March 1, 2012
Miyo wakes up after a few seconds and tells E-Boy to try again. E-Boy was able to know Miyo has a crush on Princess. He also tells Miyo what it felt like reading Karla's mind, like there was a heavy feeling inside his chest. E-Boy overhears Gabriel talking to his lawyer about another case thrown at them by Karla. At the lawyer's meeting, E-Boy tries to talk to Karla alone regarding what he saw in her memory. She becomes angry and thinks Gabriel is using the child for her to change her mind about the case. Miguel, who's still in prison contacts Tatang and tells him to care for Ria while he's gone.
25	"Gabriel Is Disappointed in E-Boy's Involvement with Karla's Problem"	March 2, 2012
The children try to think of ways to speak to the spirit of Congressman Mariano. Miyo remembers E-Boy's old memory card and tells the robot to access the politician's memory from there. E-Boy goes to Karla's home and shows her how her father thought he was doing the right thing for her when he told her old boyfriend to move away. E-Boy also learns of a video recording the congressman kept for Karla and shows it to her. Tatang meanwhile apologizes to Ria for his involvement in their accident. He tries to coach her to speak as she is in a catatonic state. She only utters Miyo's name when Tatang mentions how their children have become friends.
26	"Miyo Can't Believe That E-Boy Lied to Him"	March 5, 2012
Karla talks to Gabriel about what happened between her and E-Boy. She assures him that she has dropped the case against him and thanks him for creating a robot like E-Boy. Miyo decides to confess his crush on Princess and asks E-Boy to help him. However, their plan backfires when Princess tells Miyo to get lost. E-Boy admits later that he is Princess' crush, as he had seen in her memory.
27	"Miyo Shows His Dismay to E-Boy"	March 6, 2012
Miyo becomes jealous of E-Boy after the incident with Princess. He feels even his family likes E-Boy more than him. When he instructs E-Boy to play with the other kids instead of him he becomes irritated with the shouts of laughter from outside. He tries to show off to the other kids but instead becomes a laughing stock. Gabriel hears the two fighting and tells them to fix their differences. Miyo stubbornly tells E-Boy he will forgive him if he finds a 'putting uwak.' Meanwhile Miguel becomes free after his lawyer finds a technicality in the case. Karla is disappointed but her nephew Gilbert, who is also Miguel's son with his former girlfriend, is angrier at the result of the case. Miguel decides to steal E-Boy from Gabriel to make money so he and Ria can live abroad.
28	"E-Boy Receives Wrong Guidance in Trying to Gain Miyo's Forgiveness"	March 7, 2012
29	"Miyo Is Very Disappointed with His Father"	March 8, 2012
30	"Miyo Does Everything to Find Raprap"	March 9, 2012
31	"Where Will E-boy's Heart Lead Him Next?"	March 12, 2012
32	"E-Boy Tries to Bring Ria Home"	March 13, 2012
33	"Miguel Certainly Has a Different Plan for Ria"	March 14, 2012
34	"Tatang Returns the Favor by Helping E-Boy"	March 15, 2012
35	"E-boy May Be Prone to Malfunction"	March 16, 2012
36	"E-Boy Pushes His Power to It's Limit"	March 19, 2012
37	"Gabriel Continues to Be on Ria and Miyo's Good Side"	March 20, 2012
38	"E-Boy Wants to Discover the True Meaning of His Dream"	March 21, 2012
39	"Ria Discovers Raprap's Secret"	March 22, 2012
40	"Raprap's Friends Leave Him After Hearing What Happened to Miyo"	March 23, 2012
41	"E-Boy Decides It's Best to Do His Mission Alone"	March 26, 2012
42	"Miyo Wants to Extend His Hand to Help E-Boy"	March 27, 2012
43	"Princess Tells E-Boy and Miyo That They Should Find Tatang"	March 28, 2012
44	"Tatang Suggests a New Plan to Free Gabriel"	March 29, 2012
45	"Meet Gabriel's New Masterpiece, MegaBot"	March 30, 2012
46	"E-Boy and Miyo Are Puzzled with the Existence of Another Robot"	April 2, 2012
47	"MegaBot Looks for E-Boy, Miyo and Ria"	April 3, 2012
48	"E-Boy and Miyo Join Forces with MegaBot to Save Their Parents"	April 4, 2012
49	"How Will E-Boy Bring His Family Back Together?"	April 9, 2012
50	"Miguel Sets His Eyes on Finding E-Boy"	April 10, 2012
51	"Gabriel Hopes to Fool Miguel with MegaBot"	April 11, 2012
52	"Gabriel Tries to Save Ria from Miguel's Hands"	April 12, 2012
53	"Eboy Will Be Forever Thankful to His Family"	April 13, 2012
