= Monica Cuenco =

- Also known as: Maria Monica Cuenco
- Born: Ma. Monica Sacay Cuenco; November 23, 1994 (age 31); Cebu City, Philippines
- Genre: Pop
- Occupation: Singer
- Years active: 2011–2012, 2015–present
- Agents: Star Magic (2011–2012); Viva Artists Agency (2015–present)

Maria Monica Sacay Cuenco, also known as Monica Cuenco (born November 23, 1994) is the second runner-up of Star Power: Sharon Search For the Next Female Superstar. She is dubbed as "The Charming Biritera of Cebu". She has landed her biggest break to date, bagging the role of Dorina Pineda in an upcoming theater adaptation of classic viva hits "Bituing Walang Ningning" this June 2015.

== Early life ==
Monica lost both of her parents at a very young age. First her dad to cardiac arrest when she was 4 and then her mom to cervical cancer 11 years ago. After that, Monica lived with her aunt in Kananga Leyte and found several ways to earn her own money. Aside from singing, she also sold puto cheese and siopao to make ends meet.

In 2010, when she was 15, Monica joined the ABS-CBN talent search series, "Star Power: Sharon’s Search for the Next Female Pop Superstar". Then using the name, Monica Cuenco Sacay, she placed third runner-up while the winner Angeline Quinto in a field that also included Krissel Valdez and K-La Rivera.

The Leyte native was chosen to take on the iconic lead role of Dorina Pineda in an upcoming theater adaptation of the classic drama "Bituing Walang Ningning.”

== Tv appearances ==
Year	Title	Role	Notes
2016	Miss World Philippines 2016	Herself	
2016	My Only Love		Main cast
2015	Wattpad Presents: Iska Ispiritista	Iska Ispiritista	Main cast
2011	ASAP	Herself	Co-host / Performer
2011	Banana Split	Herself	Guest / Segment player
2011	Star Power: Sharon's Search for the Next Female Superstar	Herself	3rd runner-up

== Musical ==
Year	Title	Role	Production	Notes
2015	Bituing Walang Ningning: The Musical	Dorina Pineda	Resorts World Manila/Newport Theater	Main cast
