= LizQuen =

Filipino acting duo

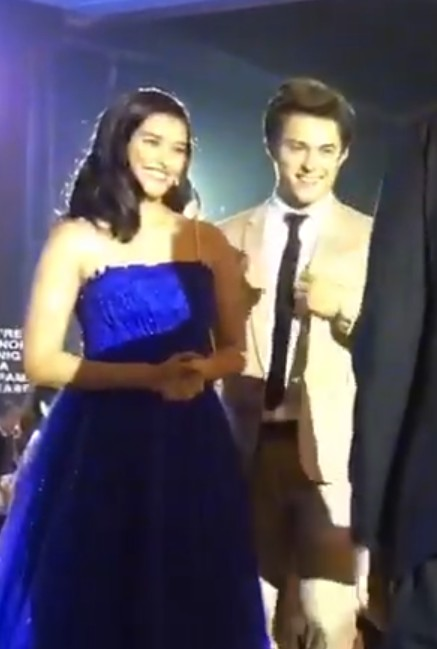
- Soberano (left) and Gil (right) in 2017
- Born: Hope Elizabeth Soberano; January 4, 1998 (aged 16–24 (Note: Age during the duration of the love team)); Santa Clara, California, United States Enrique Mari Bacay Gil V March 30, 1992 (aged 22–30); Cebu City, Philippines
- Status: Dissolved (confirmed on August 2025)
- Other names: Liza Soberano and Enrique Gil
- Occupations: Television and film actors, endorsers
- Years active: 2014–2022 (Note: From official love team launch in 2014 to quiet separation in 2022. Romantic relations confirmed to have started in 2014.)
- Employer: ABS-CBN
- Notable work: See list

LizQuen was the portmanteau for the Filipino "love team" consisting of actors Liza Soberano and Enrique Gil. They were regarded as one of the most successful and enduring on-screen pairings in Philippine entertainment during the 2010s. The pair was often categorized alongside other major love teams of their generation, such as "KathNiel" and "JaDine", notably collaborating with them for network station IDs.

== History ==
=== 2013–2015: Formation and breakthrough ===
Soberano and Gil first shared the screen in the 2013 film She's the One, where they played best friends. Before this project, Gil had already established a career with various roles, while Soberano was a newcomer to the industry. Gil reportedly requested to work with Soberano specifically after seeing her potential.

Their partnership was officially launched in October 2014 with the romantic drama series Forevermore. In the series, Soberano played a strawberry farmer named Agnes, while Gil played a rebellious hotel heir named Xander. The show was a significant ratings success and solidified their status as a popular love team.

Following the success of their first series, the pair starred in two films in 2015: Just The Way You Are and Everyday I Love You. Both movies performed well commercially, with each earning over ₱100 million at the box office.

=== 2016–2018: Box office success and television projects ===
In 2016, LizQuen returned to television with the series Dolce Amore, which was partly filmed in Italy. They followed this with the 2017 film My Ex and Whys, where they played former lovers Cali and Gio. The film became the highest-grossing Filipino movie in the first half of 2017, earning ₱400 million globally. It premiered in key cities worldwide, including in the Middle East, Europe, and North America. The film is noted for its popular lines that became part of pop culture.

In 2018, the duo starred in the fantasy series Bagani. Around this time, Soberano was set to star in a film adaptation of Darna, but she eventually withdrew from the project. She revealed later that she backed out partly due to mental health struggles and a fear that doing a solo project would end her love team with Gil. Filmmaker Olivia Lamasan also disclosed that the blockbuster film Hello, Love, Goodbye was originally pitched to Soberano and Gil before the roles were given to other actors.

=== 2019–2020: Alone/Together and cancelled projects ===
In 2019, the pair starred in Alone/Together, a romantic drama produced by Black Sheep Productions. The film was a commercial hit, earning over ₱21 million on its opening day. Within three days, it grossed ₱123 million. The film eventually crossed the ₱200 million mark after nine days. Critics praised the film for showcasing the actors' growth and ability to handle more mature roles beyond the typical romantic comedy formula.

Their final television series together was Make It With You, which premiered in January 2020. However, the show was cancelled in June 2020 and did not resume production. The cancellation was attributed to the COVID-19 pandemic and the denial of the ABS-CBN broadcast franchise. An ABS-CBN executive stated that although there were many pitches for new projects for the pair, the timing was never right due to the pandemic surges.

=== 2022–Present: Solo careers ===
By 2022, Soberano and Gil began to pursue separate career paths. Soberano moved to the United States to pursue a career in Hollywood, eventually landing a role in the film Lisa Frankenstein. Meanwhile, Gil took a three-year hiatus from show business. He made his comeback in 2024 as the star and producer of the comedy film I Am Not Big Bird.

Despite their professional separation, Gil continued to express support for Soberano's international endeavors. He visited her in New Orleans during her filming and maintained that they were supportive of each other. Soberano also organized a block screening for Gil's comeback film, although fans noted Gil's absence at the event. In early 2025, Soberano mentioned that she and Gil were discussing a concept for a potential future film collaboration, specifically in the horror genre.

== Personal lives ==
=== Relationship ===
Soberano and Gil began a romantic relationship in October 2014. Soberano admitted that she had to fight for the relationship because she was only 17 years old at the time and had a strict father. In the early stages of their partnership, Soberano used to call Gil "Kuya" (older brother) because of their age gap, but they eventually became comfortable with each other. Gil was known to be protective and gave her gifts, such as an Hermès bracelet, to cheer her up during difficult personal times.

For several years, they kept the specific details of their relationship private. It was not until February 2019, during an appearance on the talk show Gandang Gabi Vice, that they publicly confirmed they had been in a relationship for over two years. Gil had previously stated in interviews that he did not believe they needed to follow the trend of other love teams breaking up.

=== Breakup ===
Speculation about a breakup began in 2022 when the couple was rarely seen together in public. Throughout 2023 and 2024, Gil consistently denied these rumors in interviews, stating that they were just busy with their respective careers. However, unreleased interview footage from March 2023 later revealed that Soberano had admitted to a split as early as October 2022, but this information was withheld from the public at the time.

In August 2025, Soberano officially confirmed that she and Gil had broken up three years prior. She explained that Gil had asked her to delay the public announcement because he was not ready. Soberano described herself as a "people pleaser" who was afraid that a public breakup would negatively affect her career. She clarified that there was no third party involved and that they simply "grew apart" as their values no longer aligned. She referred to the separation as a "beautiful breakup" and expressed that she still loved Gil as a person and childhood best friend.

== Filmography ==
=== Film ===
Year	Title	Role		Ref.
Year	Title	Liza Soberano	Enrique Gil	
2013	She's the One	Gillian	David	
2013	Must Be... Love	Angel	Dave (Cameo)	
2015	Just The Way You Are	Sophia	Drake	
2015	Everyday I Love You	Audrey	Ethan	
2017	My Ex and Whys	Cali	Gio	
2019	Alone/Together	Christine	Raf	

=== Television ===
Year	Title	Role		Ref.
Year	Title	Liza Soberrano	Enrique Gil	
2014–2015	Forevermore	Agnes	Xander	
2016	Dolce Amore	Serena	Tenten	
2018	Bagani	Ganda	Lakas	
2020	Make It With You	Billy	Gabo	

== Discography ==
Year	Title	Artist(s)	Album	Ref.
2015	"Thank You For The Love"	LizQuen (with KathNiel, JaDine, etc.)	ABS-CBN Christmas Station ID 2015	

== See also ==
- KathNiel
- JaDine
