= JaDine =

Filipino acting and musical duo

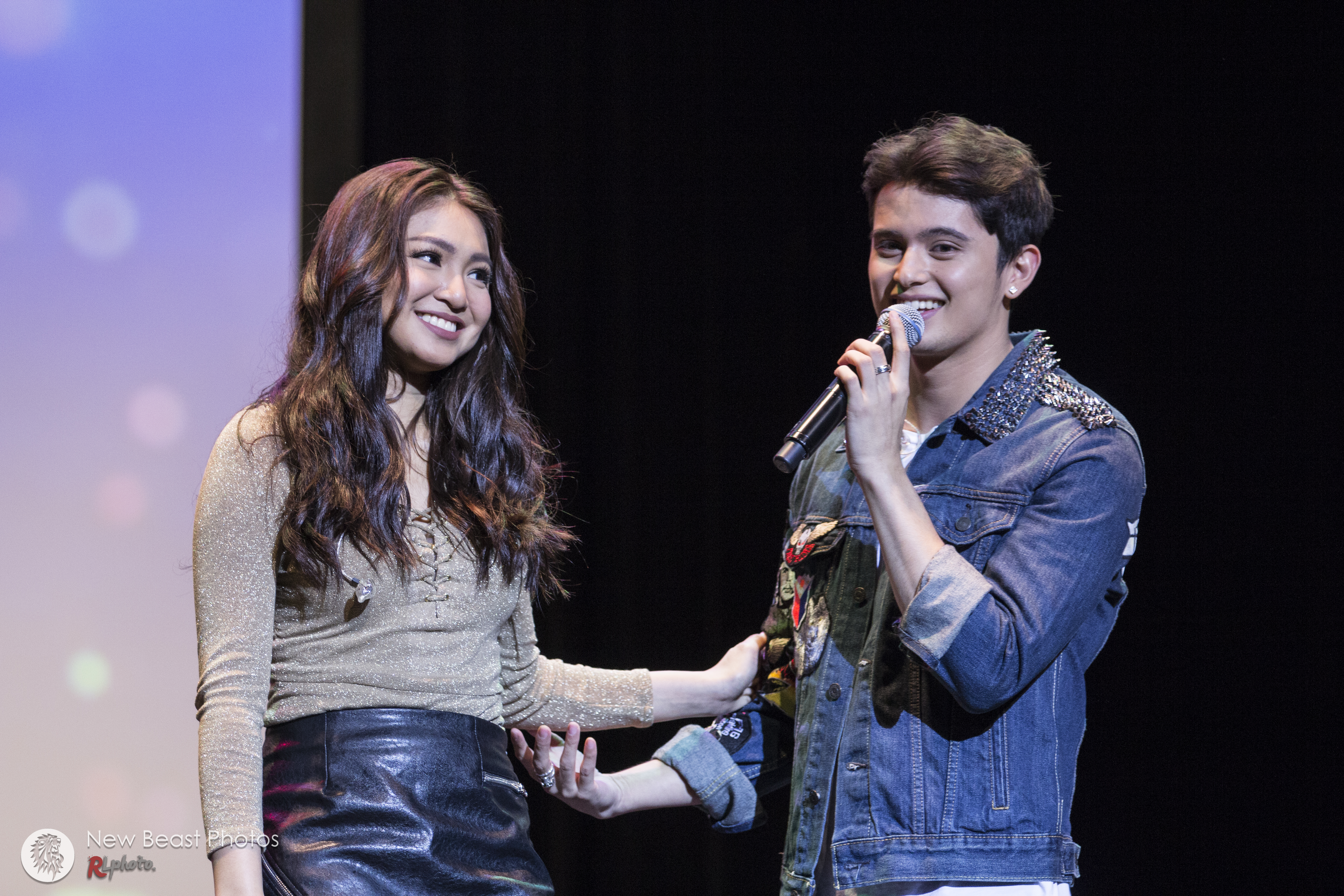
- Lustre (left) and Reid (right) in 2016
- Born: Nadine Alexis Paguia Lustre; October 31, 1993 (aged 19–26 (Note: Age during the duration of the love team)); Quezon City, Philippines Robert James Reid; May 11, 1993 (aged 20–26); Sydney, Australia
- Status: Dissolved (confirmed on January 20, 2020)
- Other names: James Reid and Nadine Lustre
- Citizenship: Filipino (Lustre); Filipino-Australian (Reid)
- Occupations: Television and film actors; singers
- Years active: 2014–2020
- Employer(s): Viva Artists Agency; ABS-CBN
- Notable work: See list

JaDine was a love team composed of Filipino actors and singers James Reid and Nadine Lustre. The media coined the name as a portmanteau of their first names.

The duo first achieved commercial success with the 2014 film adaptation of the Wattpad novel Diary ng Panget. After the film's success, the pair signed a contract with ABS-CBN. They starred in the primetime series On the Wings of Love (2015) and Till I Met You (2016). In addition to acting, they recorded songs for their projects and performed in major concerts, including "JaDine in Love" and "Revolution".

While other love teams often kept their relationship status vague, Reid and Lustre confirmed they were dating in February 2016. The media subsequently labeled them "Team Real" due to their openness. During their peak, they were ranked among the Philippines' top love teams, comparable to pairs like KathNiel and LizQuen.

The couple announced their separation in January 2020 to focus on their personal lives. After the partnership ended, both continued to work in the entertainment industry as solo artists.

== History ==
=== 2013–2014: Origins and breakthrough ===
Reid and Lustre first met in 2013 during the filming of Reid's music video for the song "Alam Niya Ba". At the time, Lustre was a member of the group Pop Girls, while Reid was the winner of Pinoy Big Brother: Teen Clash 2010. Executives at Viva Artists Agency, specifically Vicente del Rosario, noticed the chemistry between the two and cast them in the film adaptation of the Wattpad novel Diary ng Panget.

Released in 2014, Diary ng Panget was a commercial success, earning an estimated ₱120 million. This success led to a follow-up film in the same year, Talk Back and You're Dead, which grossed approximately ₱76.9 million. Following these films, the pair signed an exclusive contract with ABS-CBN and starred in the Wansapanataym miniseries My App #Boyfie.

=== 2015–2016: On the Wings of Love and relationship confirmation ===
In 2015, the pair starred in the film Para sa Hopeless Romantic. The duo gained mainstream recognition after starring in the primetime series, On the Wings of Love. The series, which focused on the lives of OFWs, ran for six months.

On February 20, 2016, during the "JaDine in Love" concert at the Smart Araneta Coliseum, Reid stated "I love you" to Lustre in front of the audience. In interviews following the concert, they confirmed they had officially become a couple on February 11, 2016. Some observers initially questioned the authenticity of the relationship, suggesting it was for promotion, but the couple maintained it was real.

Following the announcement, they released a summer movie titled This Time in May 2016, which opened with ₱15 million in earnings. They also released a book titled Team Real, which provided details about their personal lives and relationship history.

In August 2016, the couple starred in the series Till I Met You, directed by Antoinette Jadaone. The show was filmed in Greece and featured a storyline involving a love triangle with actor JC Santos. The series was noted for its soundtrack, which revived classic OPM songs. Critics also noted the show's inclusion of LGBT themes.

=== 2017–2019: Concerts, music, and solo ventures ===
In February 2018, JaDine held their second major concert, titled "Revolution", at the Smart Araneta Coliseum. The concert was directed by Paul Basinillo and focused on showcasing their growth as musical artists. It featured guests such as Sarah Geronimo and Vice Ganda. That same year, they released the film Never Not Love You, which portrayed a more mature relationship compared to their previous rom-coms.

During this period, Reid launched his own music label, Careless, with Lustre signing as one of the artists. Lustre stated in interviews that they were focusing on making music and collaborating off-screen. Rumors of a rift between the couple and friend Yassi Pressman surfaced, though Pressman denied these claims, stating they remained in touch.

By late 2019, reports of a breakup began to circulate after Lustre posted cryptic captions on Instagram. However, fans disputed these claims by posting photos of the couple celebrating New Year's Eve together.

=== 2020: Breakup ===
On January 1, 2020, entertainment news outlet PEP.ph reported that the couple had separated due to "irreconcilable differences" and that Lustre had moved out of their shared home in Quezon City. Columnist Ricky Lo subsequently wrote a piece confirming the split and mentioning the couple's living arrangement. Lustre initially criticized Lo's article, denying the claims and citing mental health concerns.

On January 20, 2020, Reid and Lustre issued a joint statement through the program Tonight with Boy Abunda, officially confirming their breakup. They stated that they decided to separate to focus on their personal growth and careers but remained good friends and would continue to work together on music. Following the announcement, topics related to the breakup trended on Twitter in the Philippines.

=== Post-breakup ===
Following the split, both artists pursued individual careers. In a 2025 interview, Reid described the "JaDine" fame as a "phenomenon" but noted it involved a "toxic culture" and mental stress. He stated that a reunion of the love team was unlikely out of respect for his new partner, Issa Pressman. Lustre also began a new relationship with entrepreneur Christophe Bariou. Reid expressed that he wished Lustre well and that they were civil.

== Public image ==
The media dubbed them "Team Real" after they admitted to dating in real life. This branding was used in various merchandise, including a book and a special edition magazine published by Summit Media. In 2016, Teen Vogue featured the couple, noting that they stood out from other love teams because they did not pretend for the audience. The article described them as a "fairytale ending" for their fans.

Critics often discussed the nature of their relationship. Critics noted that the "love team" format often blurred the distinction between fiction and reality for commercial gain. Other writers praised the pair's work ethic and financial support for their families. Reid once dismissed claims that they were the "number one" love team, attributing their status to "noise" and "hype" rather than competition.

Reports that the couple lived together also drew media attention. When asked about the rumors in 2017, Lustre replied, "Come on guys, it's 2017", a remark interpreted by some as challenging traditional norms. After their split, some columnists suggested that spending too much time together may have strained the relationship.

Entertainment figures like Boy Abunda and Cherry Pie Picache praised the duo for their professionalism. Retrospective articles noted how the pair started as friends, became a couple, and eventually returned to being friends. Writers also expressed hope that they would succeed in their solo careers despite the industry pressure.

== Discography ==
=== Collaborative albums and soundtracks ===
Title	Album details	Ref.
Diary ng Panget: The Movie Soundtrack	Released: March 26, 2014; Label: Viva Records; Formats: CD, digital download	
Talk Back and You're Dead: Original Movie Soundtrack	Released: August 2014; Label: Viva Records; Formats: CD, digital download	
On the Wings of Love (Official Soundtrack)	Released: November 27, 2015; Label: Viva Records; Formats: Digital download, streaming	
This Time (Original Movie Soundtrack)	Released: April 25, 2016; Label: Viva Records; Formats: Digital download, streaming	
Never Not Love You (Original Movie Soundtrack)	Released: March 27, 2018; Label: Viva Records; Formats: Digital download, streaming	

=== Singles ===
Title	Year	Album	Ref.
"No Erase"	2014	Diary ng Panget: The Movie Soundtrack	
"Bahala Na"	2014	On the Wings of Love (OST)	
"Hanap-Hanap"	2015	Para sa Hopeless Romantic / Reid Alert	
"On the Wings of Love" (Cover version)	2015	On the Wings of Love (OST)	
"This Time"	2016	This Time (OST)	
"Till I Met You"	2016	Till I Met You (OST)	
"IL2LU"	2017	Palm Dreams	
"Prom"	2018	Never Not Love You (OST)	
"Summer"	2018	Careless Mixtape	
"Own It" (featuring Massiah)	2021	Non-album single	

=== Other appearances ===
Title	Year	Other artist(s)	Ref.
"Thank You for the Love"	2015	Daniel Padilla, Kathryn Bernardo, Enrique Gil, Liza Soberano, Bamboo Mañalac, Elha Nympha	

== Filmography ==
=== Film ===
List of films starring James Reid and Nadine Lustre
Year	Title	Roles		Notes	Ref.
Year	Title	James Reid	Nadine Lustre	Notes	Ref.
2014	Diary ng Panget	Cross Sandford	Eya Rodriguez	First film together	
2014	Talk Back and You're Dead	Timothy Odelle Pendleton	Miracle Samantha Perez	Based on Wattpad novel	
2015	Para sa Hopeless Romantic	Nikko John Borja	Rebecca del Mundo		
2015	Beauty and the Bestie	Tristan	Abi	Supporting roles	
2016	This Time	Coby Martinez	Ava Buhay	Summer release	
2018	Never Not Love You	Gio Smith	Joanne Candelaria	Directed by Antoinette Jadaone	

=== Television ===
List of television series starring James Reid and Nadine Lustre
Year	Title	Role (Reid)	Role (Lustre)	Ref.
2014	Wansapanataym: My App #Boyfie	Joe	Anika	
2015–2016	On the Wings of Love	Clark Medina	Leah Olivar	
2016–2017	Till I Met You	Sebastian "Basti" Valderama	Iris Duico	
