= E-Boy (TV series) =

Television series

- Title card
- Genre: Sci-fi; Fantasy; Drama
- Created by: ABS-CBN Studios
- Written by: Emilio Antonio Sta. Maria; Ceres Helga-Barrios; Enrique S. Villasis; Lemuel Garcellano; Adam Cornelius Asin; Jessie Villabrille
- Directed by: FM Reyes; Nick Olanka
- Starring: Bugoy Cariño
- Opening theme: "Dahil Sa'yo" by Juris Fernandez
- Country of origin: Philippines
- Original language: Filipino
- No. of episodes: 53

Production
- Executive producers: Carlo Katigbak; Cory Vidanes; Laurenti Dyogi; Malou Santos
- Producer: Kristine P. Sioson
- Cinematography: Romy Vitug
- Editors: Ray Ann Endaya; Gerard Garcia; Gilbrad Guifaya; Erika Joy Salaga
- Running time: 30-45 minutes
- Production company: Star Creatives Group

Original release
- Network: ABS-CBN
- Release: January 30 – April 13, 2012

E-Boy (stylized as eboy) is a 2012 Philippine television drama fantasy series broadcast by ABS-CBN. Directed by FM Reyes and Nick Olanka, it stars Bugoy Cariño. It aired on the network's Primetime Bida line up and worldwide on TFC from January 30 to April 13, 2012, replacing Ikaw ay Pag-Ibig and was replaced by Princess and I.

The story revolves around a child robot who was given human characteristics that led him to a journey where he will learn what being human is all about. The series is streaming online on YouTube.

== Overview ==
E-Boy follows a child robot endowed with human characteristics who embarks on jaouney to understand what it means to be human. though his experiences he learns that humanity is defined less by physical biology than family, friendship and unconditional love.

"E-Boy" stars Bugoy Cariño, as well as seasoned actors Ariel Rivera, Jomari Yllana, Agot Isidro, Valerie Concepcion, Jaime Fabregas, Chinggoy Alonzo, and Pen Medina. Other cast members include Andrea Brillantes, Arjo Atayde, Carme Sanchez, Akiko Solon, Bryan Santos, and child stars Maliksi Morales and Deydey Amansec.

Year	Episode numbers	Episodes	First aired	Last aired
2012	1–53	53	January 30, 2012	April 13, 2012

== Cast and characters ==
=== Main cast ===
Cast	Character	Summary
Bugoy Cariño	E-Boy/Rap-Rap/Alphabot/Megabot	A robotic toy invented by a brilliant man named Gabriel. E-boy has the ability to read and interpret human brain waves. When Gabriel's son died, he transferred all of his child's brainwaves into E-boy. E-boy thus starts taking the personality of the deceased child. He is obedient and very bright. He is also very intuitive and rarely goes against the wishes of his father. He is very loyal and amused by anything that is human. With an intuitive mind and a keen sense of observation, he can also mimic anyone—copying their mannerisms, behaviors, and tendencies.
Andrea Brillantes	Princess	As a street kid, Princess knows the rules of the streets. Although boyish in character, she maintains a positive outlook in life. A believer in dreams and fairytales, she is a reliable and supportive friend who is an excellent negotiator often mediating conflicts. She easily makes friends wherever she goes. Who know that have a crush on E-boy.
Ariel Rivera	Gabriel Villareal	The very brilliant inventor behind E-boy. Gabriel grew up with his Mother who died before he has come of age—a reason why he had to go back to his father who nonetheless was a brilliant inventor as well. Gabriel was brought up by his mother to be a positive, caring, and a kind person. He easily sees the goodness in other people and possesses a free and imaginative mind. His attention to detail is also unrivaled. Contrary to what inventors think as science is a set of rigid rules, Gabriel thinks that science is actually like a magical world that needs to be explored.

=== Supporting cast ===
Cast	Character	Summary
Agot Isidro	Ria	A smart sophisticated modern woman from a family of doctors, Ria is set to becoming a doctor herself. Everything is set for her until she falls in love with a guy. This is where Ria realizes what is important to her: She is really not about ambition but instead wants to live a simple normal life, with a family that she longs for all her life. Ria is caring and has a very kind spirit. Family is more important to her and she'll do everything for them. She is a strong woman herself especially when it comes to the welfare of her own family.
Jomari Yllana	Miguel Villareal	Miguel is Gabriel's elder half-brother though they have different mothers. Probably because he had such a hard time earning the approval of his father, Miguel is a bit of the rebellious kind unlike Gabriel. Although he may not have the smarts of his brother, Miguel is however, very good strategist. He is charming and many say that he can always talk his way out of things. Miguel is fun, thrilling, and adventurous. But deep inside, he is very sensitive and is actually a jealous person. Though he has learned to love his half brother, he has become the same source of his insecurity. His great ambition for himself is to someday be on top—with the belief that everyone will love him unconditionally by then.
Maliksi Morales	Adrian	Adrian is the eldest son of Gabriel and Ria. An intelligent, industrious child, he is deemed to be the ideal boy every parent would want as a child. Adrian is also a loving sibling to his younger brother, Miyo. In some instances, he will cover up for Miyo's mischievous deeds.
Arjo Atayde	Jepoy	At the age of 18, he has learned to fend for himself. He grew up in a difficult life and without parents to look after him. Although he has a tough life to live, he is still very kind, decent, and very responsible, although a bit Jologs. He values hard work—working by day and studying by night. He only dreams of a normal life with a decent job, earning just enough to live day by day.
Akiko Solon	Ella Dela Cruz	The daughter of Rutherford and Delia who believes that one day she will make it big as a TV Personality in Manila. She is a Barrio lass with big dreams determined and persistent to make her dreams happen. This persistence and perseverance is natural to her. When she gets into the city, she realizes that her world is bigger than her dreams. Because of her uncanny sense of humor, she gets by even in tough situations.
Bryan Santos	Gilbert	Introspective. Rebellious. The “Bad boy” from a well-off family. He is a bit snooty and snobbish at first impression. Sometimes he's thought to be bitter and volatile. But the truth is, he has a vulnerable heart. He is an artist and is actually very sensitive. If there is one thing he dislikes, it is being told what to do.
Jaime Fabregas	Alfredo Villareal	Alberto is the father of both Gabriel and Miguel as well as the grandfather of Adrian (E-Boy) and Miyo. Still struggling to recover from a massive heart attack, Alberto is now but a shell of his former self. He was once a proud inventor known among the scientific community. Unfortunately after a setback from a prestigious award, everything went downhill for him. This is probably the reason why Alberto has never appeared to be a caring father to his children: He expected too much from himself that he also kept setting unrealistic expectations to his kids as well. often getting disappointed. He is often disappointed of his kids, only because he harbors a dream that one day, one of them shall continue his legacy, etching a mark in history by making a significant invention for the world.
Pen Medina	Tatang	He serves as the father figure of Tinay and Jepoy. The streets formed his hardened life—He was once a well-decorated criminal. Now that he's turned his back from his criminal activities, he has become a jack-of-all-trades, engaging in various legitimate rackets. He is strict because he wants to teach those youngsters under him that the world is harsh and unfair. This emanated from a sense of cynicism that formed throughout his years of living. As he says “only the fittest shall survive.” He is very fond of Tinay and the youngsters he adopted treating them like real family.
Chinggoy Alonzo	Jaime Mariano	He is a shrewd and ambitious politician who has a way with words. Perceived to be a reformist and a crusader, Jaime is actually a corrupt and deceiving politician. There is only one interest that is important to him and that is how to cling to power. He is capable of doing very bad things and will stop at nothing to get what he wants. Thus, people around him are careful not to offend him in any way. He knows deception well enough not to easily trust people around him, including his sons.
Carme Sanchez	Delia Dela Cruz	The loving mother of Ella, she is serene and eternally optimistic. She is very capable when it comes to raising her family. She will do everything for them. Very calm, altruistic, and a woman with wisdom. She usually dispenses her advice in a funny and quirky manner in order not to sound preachy.
Deydey Amansec	Miyo	Miyo is Gabriel and Ria's youngest child. Despite being a perennial rule breaker, Miyo is more free spirited. Often, this leads to trouble. Sooner or later, he is bound to break a rule—restraining him tempts him all the more. Often reprimanded by his father, Miyo turns to his mother whom he believes understands him more. Miyo believes in real life fairy-tales. He dreams that one day he will embark on his own adventures.

=== Extended cast ===
- Valerie Concepcion as Karla Mariano
- Crispin Pineda as Rutherford Dela Cruz
- Tommy Abuel as Merlito Vergara
- Gerald Pesigan as Megabot
- Izzy Canillo as Vans
- Barbie Sabino as Mae-mae
- Phytos Kyriacou as Pugo
- Paolo Serrano as Rocky

=== Special participation ===
- Slater Young as Adult Miyo
- Jessy Mendiola as Adult Princess
- Martin del Rosario as teen Gabriel
- Empress Schuck as teen Ria
- Joseph Marco as teen Miguel
- Dominic Ochoa as young Alfredo
- Jairus Aquino as young Gabriel
- Cajo Gomez as young Miguel
- Gerald Madrid as young Rutherford
- Justin Gonzales as Anthony
- Yen Santos as young Karla
- Boom Labrusca as young Tatang
- Neri Naig as Linda Velasquez
- Cherry Lou as Claire Villareal
- Phebe Khae Arbortante as Lorraine
- Aaron Junatas as Ramboy
- Owie Boy Gapuz as Kevin
- Brenna Garcia-Peñaflor as Dianne

== Reception ==
=== Ratings ===
According to Kantar Media/TNS ratings, E-boy registered a 28.1% ratings share nationwide beating GMA's Munting Heredera, which only got 18.8%. The pilot episode premiered victoriously reigning on first place nationwide. The series is currently the most-watched children's television series whilst also battling with two fellow ABS-CBN dramas for primetime supremacy. It is the sixth most-watched television series overall in the month of January, despite only its few days of airing.

== See also ==
- List of programs broadcast by ABS-CBN
- List of ABS-CBN Studios original drama series
