= Barangay Singko Panalo =

- Title card
- Genre: Game show
- Directed by: Nico Faustino; Rich Ilustre
- Presented by: Sam Coloso; Joross Gamboa; Jerald Napoles; Kayla Rivera
- Country of origin: Philippines
- Original language: Tagalog
- No. of episodes: 75

Production
- Executive producers: Jane Jimenez-Basas; Guido R. Zaballero
- Producer: Sienna G. Olaso
- Running time: 45-55 minutes
- Production company: The IdeaFirst Company

Original release
- Network: TV5
- Release: March 11 – June 28, 2024

Barangay Singko Panalo (transl. neighborhood five wins) is a Philippine television game show broadcast by TV5. Hosted by Jerald Napoles and Kayla Rivera, it aired on the network's TodoMax Primetime Singko line up and worldwide on Kapatid Channel from March 11 to June 28, 2024, replacing Wow Mali: Doble Tawa and was replaced by Wil To Win.

In April 2024, Joross Gamboa and Sam Coloso joined the show as co-hosts.

The show is available for streaming online on YouTube.
