= Star Power (TV program) =

2010–11 Philippine television reality show

- Genre: Interactive, Reality television
- Created by: ABS-CBN Corporation
- Directed by: Johnny Manahan
- Presented by: Sharon Cuneta; Erik Santos; Christian Bautista
- Judges: Bobot Mortiz; Billy Crawford; Mitch Valdes
- Country of origin: Philippines
- Original language: Tagalog
- No. of episodes: 20

Production
- Production locations: Quezon City, Metro Manila
- Running time: 1 1/2 hours

Original release
- Network: ABS-CBN
- Release: October 10, 2010 – February 20, 2011

Star Power: Sharon's Search for the Next Female Pop Superstar is a Philippine television reality competition show broadcast by ABS-CBN. Hosted by Sharon Cuneta, Erik Santos, and Christian Bautista, it aired on the network's Yes Weekend line-up from October 10, 2010 to February 20, 2011, replacing Sharon and was replaced by the second season of Pilipinas Got Talent and Gandang Gabi, Vice!.

The program aimed to develop 15- to 21-year-old female singers into becoming the next female singing superstar. Regional-wide searches began in Metro Manila, Luzon, the Visayas, and Mindanao from August to September 2010.

== Weekly Themes ==
Each week of the show had a particular theme.

- October 24, 31 and November 7, 2010: My Story, My Song
- October 24, 2010: First batch - Camille, Glaiza, Angeline, Laurice, Rheena, Macy, Sam
- October 31, 2010: Second batch - Pauline, Ninay, Kaye, Joy, Akiko, Cristele, Krissel
- November 7, 2010: Third batch - Rose Ann, Jizelle, Mia, Natasia, K-La, Monica
- November 14, 2010: Songs of Dedication and Thankfulness
- November 21, 2010: Favorite Things and Persons
- November 28, 2010: Versatility (Songs Chosen by their Co-Finalists)
- December 5, 2010: Sing and Dance Week
- December 12, 2010: Arnel Pineda's Choice
- December 19, 2010: Christmas Special (Non-Elimination Round)
  - With Jed Madela
  - With Aiza Seguerra and Princess of ASAP Sessionistas
- December 26, 2010: Requested Songs by Kapamilya Leading Men
- January 2, 2011: Prof. Kitchy Molina's Choice
- January 9, 2011: Mega Song Choice (Birthday Tribute)
- January 16, 2011: Celebrity Duets
- January 30, 2011: Performance with Sessionistas
- February 6, 2011: Showdown of Showmanship
- February 13, 2011: Homecoming Special and Classic OPM Love Songs
- February 20, 2011: Star Power Grand Showdown (Personal Choice, Judges' Choice, Star Records Compositions)
  - Red for Akiko
  - Green for Angeline
  - Pink for K-La
  - Yellow for Krissel
  - Blue for Monica

== Star Power 5 Grand Finalists ==
Angeline Quinto was a grand finalist of "Star for a Night", the batch where Sarah Geronimo won in 2002. Prior to Star Power, she joined in GMA 7's variety show Diz Iz It! for "Diz Iz Kantahan: Challenge the Champion", where she was a wildcard finalist this year.

1. Habang May Buhay - Wency Cornejo, October 24, 2010
2. Paano Kita Mapapasalamatan - Sarah Geronimo, November 14, 2010
3. I Don't Want to Miss a Thing - Aerosmith, November 21, 2010
4. Don't Cry Out Loud - Rachelle Ann Go, November 28, 2010
5. Single Ladies - Beyoncé, December 5, 2010
6. Love of My Life - Queen, December 12, 2010
7. Pasko Na Sinta Ko - With Jed Madela, December 19, 2010
8. How Did You Know - Gary Valenciano, December 26, 2010 (Requested by Zanjoe Marudo)
9. Through The Fire - Chaka Khan, January 2, 2011
10. Ikaw - Sharon Cuneta, January 9, 2011
11. I Finally Found Someone - Bryan Adams and Barbra Streisand, with Jett Pangan January 16, 2011
12. These Dreams - Heart (with Juris Fernandez and Nina Girado), January 30, 2011
13. Love The Way You Lie - Rihanna, with Monica, February 6, 2011
14. Ang Lahat ng Ito'y Para sa 'Yo - Hajji Alejandro, February 13, 2011
15. What Kind of Fool Am I - Regine Velasquez, February 20, 2011
16. I Don't Want to Miss a Thing - Aerosmith, February 20, 2011
17. Patuloy Ang Pangarap - Original Song composed by Jonathan Manalo, February 20, 2011, Winner

Krissel Valdez was a band vocalist from Davao City. According to her, being in Star Power was her first singing contest on Philippine television that she ever joined.

1. I Believe I Can Fly - R. Kelly, October 31, 2010
2. You've Made Me So Very Happy - Blood, Sweat and Tears, November 14, 2010
3. Sweet Love - Anita Baker, November 21, 2010
4. Ikaw Ang Pangarap - Martin Nievera, November 28, 2010
5. One Night Only - Dreamgirls, December 5, 2010
6. Someday - Nina, December 12, 2010
7. Pasko Na Sinta Ko - with Jed Madela, December 19, 2010
8. You And Me - Lifehouse, December 26, 2010 (Requested by Derek Ramsay)
9. A Moment Like This - Kelly Clarkson, January 2, 2011
10. Kung Ako Na Lang Sana - Sharon Cuneta, January 9, 2011
11. Whenever You Call - Mariah Carey and Brian Mcknight, with Bugoy Drilon January 16, 2011
12. Reasons - Earth, Wind and Fire (with Duncan Ramos and Juris Fernandez), January 30, 2011
13. Alejandro - Lady Gaga, with K-La, February 6, 2011
14. Nais Ko - Basil Valdez, February 13, 2011
15. And I'm Telling You - Jennifer Holliday, February 20, 2011
16. Someday - Nina, February 20, 2011
17. Higher - Original Song composed by Gino Torres, February 20, 2011, Second Place

Monica Sacay was a 15-year-old contestant from Ormoc, Leyte. At her young age, her parents died and she is now living with her foster parents.

1. Pangarap na Bituin - Sharon Cuneta, November 7, 2010
2. I Can - Regine Velasquez, November 14, 2010
3. Kailan - Smokey Mountain November 21, 2010
4. Bring Me to Life - Evanescence, November 28
5. If You Could Read My Mind - Stars on 54, December 5, 2010
6. Blue Bayou - Linda Ronstadt, December 12, 2010
7. Nakaraang Pasko - with Jed Madela, December 19, 2010
8. 'Till My Heartaches End - Carol Banawa, December 26, 2010 (Requested by Gerald Anderson)
9. Through The Rain - Mariah Carey, January 2, 2011
10. Now That You're Gone - Sharon Cuneta, January 9, 2011
11. Fever - Michael Bublé, with Richard Poon January 16, 2011
12. Superstar - The Carpenters, (with Sitti Navarro and Richard Poon), January 30, 2011
13. You Belong With Me - Taylor Swift, with Krissel, February 6, 2011
14. Ngayon - Basil Valdez, February 13, 2011
15. This Is My Now - Jordin Sparks, February 20, 2011
16. Through The Rain - Mariah Carey, February 20, 2011
17. Keep On Dreaming - Original Song composed by Jonathan Manalo and Rox Santos, February 20, 2011 Third Place

K-La Rivera is a Fil-Canadian. She was discovered by Willie Revillame in Wowowee and sings in the said noontime show.

1. You Are Not Alone - Michael Jackson, November 7, 2010
2. Greatest Love Of All - Whitney Houston, November 14, 2010
3. Inseparable - Natalie Cole, November 21, 2010
4. It Might Be You - Stephen Bishop, November 28, 2010
5. I Wanna Dance With Somebody- Whitney Houston, December 5, 2010
6. You Light Up My Life - Barbra Streisand, December 12, 2010
7. Nakaraang Pasko - With Aiza Seguerra and Princess of ASAP Sessionistas, December 19, 2010
8. Teenage Dream - Katy Perry, December 26, 2010 (Requested by Sam Milby)
9. Stand Up For Love - Destiny's Child, January 2, 2011
10. Hagkan - Sharon Cuneta, January 9, 2011
11. When You Believe - Mariah Carey and Whitney Houston, with Vina Morales January 16, 2011
12. Emotions - Destiny's Child (with Sitti Navarro and Nina Girado), January 30, 2011
13. Thinking of You - Katy Perry with Akiko Solon, February 6, 2011
14. Dito Ba - Kuh Ledesma, February 13, 2011
15. Listen - Beyoncé, February 20, 2011
16. It Might Be You - Stephen Bishop, February 20, 2011, Eliminated - Fourth Place

Akiko Solon was once a Monthly Finalist in Little Big Star Cebu. She won the Josenian Got Talent 2010 Grand Championship.

1. I Believe- Fantasia Barrino, October 31, 2010
2. Salamat - Yeng Constantino, November 14, 2010
3. Last Dance - Donna Summer, November 21, 2010
4. Home - Diana Ross, November 28, 2010
5. Beautiful Liar - Beyoncé, December 5, 2010
6. Nakapagtataka - APO Hiking Society, December 12, 2010
7. Pasko Na Sinta Ko - With Jed Madela, December 19, 2010
8. Home - Chris Daughtry, December 26, 2010 (Requested by John Lloyd Cruz)
9. Its All Coming Back To Me Now - Celine Dion, January 2, 2011
10. Sana'y Wala Ng Wakas - Sharon Cuneta, January 9, 2011
11. Bleeding Love - Leona Lewis, with Yeng Constantino January 16, 2011
12. Making Love Out of Nothing At All - Air Supply, (with Princess Velasco and Aiza Seguerra), January 30, 2011
13. You're Love Is My Drug - Ke$ha, with Angeline Quinto, February 6, 2011
14. Magsimula Ka - Leo Valdez, February 13, 2011
15. Deja Vu - Beyoncé, February 20, 2011, Eliminated - Fifth Place

== Star Power Final 12 ==
Ninay Lescano is a disc jockey from Batangas who is known for her redhead fashion statement.

1. On My Own - Whitney Houston, October 31, 2010
2. I'll Be There for You - Aiza Seguerra, November 14, 2010
3. Picture of You - Boyzone, November 21, 2010
4. I Want To Know What Love Is - Mariah Carey, November 28, 2010
5. Whenever, Wherever - Shakira, December 5, 2010
6. My Immortal - Evanescence, December 12, 2010
7. Pasko Na Sinta Ko - With Jed Madela, December 19, 2010
8. Naalala Ka - Rey Valera, December 26, 2010 (Requested by Jericho Rosales) Eliminated - January 2, 2011

Kaye Racho

1. Breakaway - Kelly Clarkson, October 31, 2010
2. There You'll Be - Faith Hill, November 14, 2010
3. Huwag Na Huwag Mong Sasabihin - Kitchie Nadal, November 21, 2010
4. I'll Never Love This Way Again - Dionne Warwick, November 28, 2010
5. Waking Up in Vegas - Katy Perry, December 5, 2010
6. Alone - Heart, December 12, 2010
7. Nakaraang Pasko - With Aiza Seguerra and Princess of ASAP Sessionistas, December 19, 2010 Eliminated - December 26, 2010

Macy delos Reyes (17, Pop Charmer of Cebu)

1. True Colors - Cyndi Lauper, October 24, 2010
2. You're The Inspiration - Peter Cetera, November 14, 2010
3. I Need You - LeAnn Rimes, November 21, 2010
4. Better Days - Dianne Reeves, November 28, 2010
5. Disturbia - Rihanna, December 5, 2010, Eliminated - December 12, 2010

Laurice Bermillo (15, Aspiring Star of Bataan)
She was a previous contestant in the second season of Little Big Star where she placed fourth in the grand finals of Big Division.

1. Only Hope - Mandy Moore, October 24, 2010
2. Angels Brought Me Here - Carrie Underwood, November 14, 2010
3. You've Got A Friend - James Taylor, November 21, 2010
4. A House Is Not a Home - Luther Vandross, November 28, 2010
5. Closer - Ne-Yo, December 5, 2010, Eliminated - December 12, 2010

Rose Ann Francisco (15, Singing Bida from Batangas City)

1. I'll Be Alright - Sarah Geronimo, November 7, 2010
2. Dahil Minahal Mo Ako - Sarah Geronimo, November 14, 2010
3. Ikaw - Sarah Geronimo, November 21, 2010
4. Brick By Boring Brick - Paramore, November 28, 2010, Eliminated - December 5, 2010

Natasia Cunanan (20, Precious Voice from Bulacan)

1. Iingatan Ka - Carol Banawa, November 7, 2010
2. You Are My Song - Regine Velasquez, November 14, 2010
3. Rainbow - South Border, November 21, 2010, Eliminated - November 28, 2010

Sam Hernandez (16, All Out Performer from Taguig)

1. I Turn to You - Christina Aguilera, October 24, 2010
2. Thanks to You - Tyler Collins, November 14, 2010
3. I Dreamed a Dream - Susan Boyle, November 21, 2010, Eliminated - November 28, 2010

== Semi-finals ==
- Pauline Lutero (15, Makati City)
1. Manalig Ka - Laarni Lozada, October 31, 2010
2. Wind Beneath My Wings - Bette Midler, November 14, 2010, Eliminated - November 21, 2010
- Joy Laquinario (19, Davao)
1. You'll Never Walk Alone - Regine Velasquez, October 31, 2010
2. Healing - Deniece Williams, November 14, 2010, Eliminated - November 21, 2010
- Mia Flores (18, Mandaluyong)
1. Listen - Beyoncé, November 7, 2010
2. At Your Side - The Corrs, November 14, 2010, Eliminated- November 21, 2010
- Camille Peralta (18, Plaridel, Bulacan)
1. Lipad ng Pangarap - Gary Valenciano, October 24, 2010, Eliminated- November 7, 2010
- Glaiza Micua (18, Taguig City)
1. If I Ain't Got You - Alicia Keys, October 24, 2010, Eliminated - November 7, 2010
- Rheena Ferrer (18, Makati City)
1. The Time of My Life - David Cook, October 24, 2010, Eliminated- November 7, 2010
- Cristele Rein Gonzales (15, Compostela Valley)
1. Note to God - Charice, October 31, 2010, Eliminated - November 7, 2010
- Jizelle Formilleza (16, Compostela Valley)
1. The Voice Within - Christina Aguilera, November 7, 2010, Eliminated - November 7, 2010

== Mentors ==
- November 28, 2010 - Annie Quintos (The Company)
- December 5, 2010 - Georcelle Dapat
- December 12, 2010 - Arnel Pineda
- December 26, 2010 - Zsa Zsa Padilla
- January 2, 2011 - Prof. Kitchy Molina of University of the Philippines' College of Music

== Round 1 Theme: Her Choice ==
Finalist	Song	Score	Place
A. Akiko Solon	Deja Vu	78.774%	OUT
B. K-la Rivera	Listen	81.512%	4TH
C. Monica Sacay	This is my Now	84.924%	2ND
D. Angeline Quinto	What Kind of Fool I Am	89.291%	1ST
E. Krissel Valdez	And I'm Telling You	84.430%	3RD

== Round 2 Theme: Judge Choice Song ==
Finalist	Song	Score	Place
A. Akiko Solon	OUT	TBA	OUT
B. K-la Rivera	It Might Be You	83.45%	OUT
C. Monica Sacay	Through The Rain	86.07%	2ND
D. Angeline Quinto	I Don't Wanna Miss A Thing	90.03&	1ST
E. Krissel Valdez	Someday	84.92%	3RD

== Round 3 Theme: Original Composition ==
Finalist	Song	Score	Place
A. Akiko Solon	OUT	TBA	OUT
B. K-la Rivera	OUT	TBA	OUT
C. Monica Sacay	Keep On Dreaming	85.196	OUT
D. Angeline Quinto	Patuloy Ang Pangarap	92.888	1ST
E. Krissel Valdez	Higher	88.703	2ND

== Total of The Showdown ==
Finalist	Score 1	Score 2	Score 3	Total Score	Place
A. Akiko Solon	78.774	OUT	OUT	78.774	4th Runner-Up
B. K-la Rivera	81.512	83.45	OUT	82.481	3rd Runner-Up
C. Monica Sacay	84.924	86.07	85.196	85.396	2nd Runner-Up
D. Angeline Quinto	89.291	90.03	92.888	90.736	Winner
E. Krissel Valdez	84.430	84.92	88.703	86.176	1st Runner-Up

== Elimination chart ==
In each round, contestants were ranked to separate the lowest 4 ("Low4"). In the final rounds, there were 4 runners-up.

Legend
Top 20	Top 15	Top 12	Top 5	Non-Elimination	Runners-Up	Winner

Safe	Eliminated

Stage:		Semi-Finals												Finals
Week:		10/ 24	10/ 31	11 /7	11/ 14	11/ 21	11/ 28	12 /5	12/ 12	12/ 19	12/ 26	01/ 2	01/ 9	02/ 20
Place	Contestant	Result												
1	Angeline Quinto						Low4			Non- Elim		Low4	Non- Elim	Winner
2	Krissel Valdez							Low4		Non- Elim	Low4	Low4	Non- Elim	1st Runner-up
3	Monica Sacay					Low4		Low4		Non- Elim			Non- Elim	2nd Runner-up
4	K-La Rivera								Low4	Non- Elim		Low4	Non- Elim	3rd Runner-up
5	Akiko Solon						Low4			Non- Elim	Low4		Non- Elim	4th Runner-up
6	Ninay Lescano							Low4		Non- Elim	Low4	Elim		
7	Kaye Racho								Low4	Non- Elim	Elim			
8-9	Macy Delos Reyes								Elim					
8-9	Laurice Bermillo								Elim					
10	Rose Ann Francisco							Elim						
11-12	Natasia Cunanan						Elim							
11-12	Sam Hernandez						Elim							
13-15	Pauline Lutero					Elim								
13-15	Joy Laquinario					Elim								
13-15	Mia Flores					Elim								
16-20	Camille Peralta			Elim										
16-20	Rheena Rei Ferrer			Elim										
16-20	Glaiza Micua			Elim										
16-20	Cristele Rein Gonzales			Elim										
16-20	Jizelle Formilleza			Elim										

== Guesting ==
- ASAP XV
- Banana Split
