= Princess and I =

2012 Filipino Royal TV series and program

- Title card
- Genre: Drama; Romantic comedy
- Created by: ABS-CBN Studios
- Written by: Henry King Quitian
- Directed by: Dado C. Lumibao; Francis E. Pasion; Rory B. Quintos
- Starring: Kathryn Bernardo; Daniel Padilla; Enrique Gil; Khalil Ramos
- Opening theme: "Nag-iisang Bituin" by Christian Bautista and Angeline Quinto
- Country of origin: Philippines
- Original language: Filipino
- No. of episodes: 210

Production
- Executive producers: Carlo Katigbak; Cory Vidanes; Laurenti Dyogi; Malou Santos
- Producers: Des De Guzman-Tanwangco; Mylene Ongkiko; Janina Elaine Maquiddang
- Production locations: Philippines; Bhutan
- Editors: Kathryn Denise Chua; Ayen del Carmen; Joseph Nathaniel Lopez; Marietta Manlutac; Thea Regadio
- Running time: 30-45 minutes
- Production company: Star Creatives

Original release
- Network: ABS-CBN
- Release: April 16, 2012 – February 1, 2013

Princess and I is a Philippine television drama romance series broadcast by ABS-CBN. Directed by Dado C. Lumibao, Francis E. Pasion and Rory B. Quintos, it stars Kathryn Bernardo, Daniel Padilla, Enrique Gil and Khalil Ramos. It aired on the network's Primetime Bida line up and worldwide on TFC from April 16, 2012 to February 1, 2013 replacing E-Boy and was replaced by Juan dela Cruz.

This serves as KathNiel's first teleserye. The series is streaming online on YouTube.

== Plot ==
Princess Areeyah "Mikay" Wangchuck (Kathryn Bernardo) grew up with her adoptive family. She is close to her father Dinoy Maghirang (Dominic Ochoa), mother and two sisters. Unbeknownst to them, she is the only daughter of King Anand Wangchuck (Albert Martinez) and Queen Isabel Wangchuck (Precious Lara Quigaman) and is the long-lost crown princess of the fictional Kingdom of Yangdon (based on real world Bhutan). As a child, she was brought to the Philippines after Ashi Behati (Gretchen Barretto), a royal and a high-ranking influential official who desires to rule Yangdon with her son Prince Jao (Enrique Gil) tries to kill her and her mother. Behati conspired to kill Queen Isabel and the infant Areeyah by bombing Queen Isabel's convoy off the cliff, but only the Queen was killed. Behati ordered her Executive Assistant Yin Hwan Dee (Niña Dolino) to kill the child, but out of conscience, she lied to Behati, took the child and placed her under the care of Esmeralda (Sharmaine Suarez), a Filipina who works in Yangdon. Esmeralda returned to the Philippines with the princess, not knowing her identity.

During one of Esmeralda's trips to the marketplace, a bombing took place and Esmeralda lost the child in the ensuing chaos. The child, wearing a Yangdonese scarf on her back, was found by a man named Dinoy Maghirang. He adopted the child and called her Mikay. She grew up in what has been described as a "very loving family," fully aware of her adopted status. Her existence in the family made her eldest stepsister, Bianca Maghirang (Bianca Casado) grow envious and inconsiderate of Mikay. She bullied Mikay until Bianca was exiled. Only then does she realize and consider Mikay her, sister and they make up. Mikay meets her eventual best friend Kiko (Khalil Ramos) who harbors a crush on her, and Gino (Daniel Padilla), an arrogant teen who comes from an affluent family. His mother, Alicia (Marina Benipayo), was a former diplomat to Yangdon while his father, Edward Dela Rosa (Jong Cuenco), and his grandfather, Don Julio Dela Rosa (Leo Rialp), are heads of a big corporation.

Winning a trip to Yangdon, Mikay meets Jao, a Yangdonese royalty and crown prince, and the two of them become close as he tours her around without knowing that she is the missing princess. Prince Jao eventually develops an attraction for Mikay.

Upon returning to the Philippines, Mikay faces difficulties financially, along with her sister's hatred and her mother's indifference towards her. She then meets Gino, the wealthy and arrogant campus heartthrob after literally colliding with her. They meet again after another unfortunate event when Mikay's hotdog costume catches fire and starts burning. Gino saves her by carrying her into a water fountain. Knowing Mikay is in need of money, he offers her a deal to come to his grandfather's party with him and pretend to be his girlfriend, and he will pay her a huge amount in return. Hesitant at first, Mikay accepts the deal.

Gino is surprised seeing Mikay all made up, implying that he is starting to feel differently towards her, but they always end up getting into an argument. He introduces Mikay to the family, but they disliked and mistreated her, and she ends up leaving the party crying after a brief argument with Gino.

However, it does not stop there. The Mean Girls, including Bianca (Mikay's Sister) who admires Gino gets jealous upon seeing him with Mikay. They start to make her life miserable, and in an effort to help her, Gino tells them that Mikay is his girlfriend which angers Mikay as she thinks it will only make them hate her more.

Things gets complicated as Gino's grandfather decides to take away Mikay's scholarship, making the two agree yet again on another deal which is to ignore each other, and act as if the other does not exist. This deal disheartens Gino.

Later, Jao visits the Philippines with his royal butler Han (Ketchup Eusebio), to return the camera that a girl lost in Yangdon. There, he officially meets Mikay and Gino. It is revealed that Gino was in fact, Jao's best friend back in Yangdon. Gino and Mikay reconciles and ends the deal they used to have. Both Jao and Gino fall in love with Mikay. However, Mikay was rejected by both of the boys' families (Gino, by his father and grandfather, and Jao, by his mother, Ashi Behati.)

Ashi Behati learns from her assistant Yin that the princess is alive and follows Jao to the Philippines. Upon her arrival, she finds out Jao's connection with Mikay and plotted to get rid of her. King Anand finds a suspicious letter with a mark of an eagle from the Eastern Kingdom and follows Behati to investigate. When Esmeralda is found, King Anand grants her protective custody until the princess is located. Esmeralda recognizes Dinoy and deduces that Dinoy is Mikay's adoptive father after the bombing incident. The Yangdonese scarf that she was wearing was the proof of Mikay's true identity as the Yangdonese crown princess.

Dinoy feared that Mikay would be taken away and planned to move away to hide her lineage. Behati learned of Mikay and ordered for her to be killed by arson. Mikay and her family escaped the burning house but were left without a home. Anand learned of Mikay's identity and after a series of murder attempts, including Mikay and Gino becoming kidnapped, Gino was beaten by Behati's hired men as he tried to protect Mikay. Mikay bids her farewell to Gino while he was at the hospital pretending to be asleep to hide his tears. Mikay, Jao and King Anand leave for Yangdon and Mikay surprisingly sees Gino at the airport, where they bid their goodbyes as they hugged.

Mikay returned to Yangdon. She was crowned thus gained her birthright to the throne. While adjusting to the royal life, Jao joins Mikay to support her.

Later, Gino followed Mikay despite his mother's objections. As she tours him around Yangdon, they almost immediately cause trouble. People from Yangdon finds out about it through a newspaper that releases an article about "The Princess and her Filipino boyfriend", which causes the citizens to reconsider her role as princess and eventually queen. Behati then reminds the kingdom that the tradition states that the crown princess must marry a Dasho at the age of 18.

A contest was held between all Dasho of the West to determine which would marry Princess Areeyah. Gino decided to enter the competition but was rejected because he is not a Dasho. After a visit to the King's Library, Gino learned that his mother Alicia had a relationship with Dasho Kencho (Christian Vasquez), and that he had an older brother, Jao. Ashi Behati did not tell anyone the true identity of Jao, but it was part of her plan to get back the Kingdom of Yangdon. As Jao and Gino competed, they promised that whoever won would free the princess from the law. In the end, Dasho Jao won, showing that he is the next heir of Yangdon and that he is loyal, dedicated and that he loves Princess Areeyah. Mikay and Jao continue their engagement, leaving Gino devastated and feeling betrayed.

Mikay and Jao chose not to break off their engagement due to her belief that Jao would make a great king. After the contest, Mikay held an outreach program to help Yangdon's impoverished citizens. Unbeknownst to them, Yin came back to Yangdon to get revenge on Ashi Behati. Mikay collapsed from exhaustion and was carried to Ashi Behati's room. She stumbled on her jewelry and accidentally saw the Medallion of the East, which she was caught by Ashi Behati. Mikay was terrified and worried over Jao's well-being if the kingdom had learned about their true heritage. Mikay finally questioned the Kingdom about the policies concerning the East, but the Drukpah did not listen to her petition. Anand told Mikay to think of the royal engagement rather than rebels of the East.

The Royal Engagement was a time of celebration for Yangdon, with Dasho Jao and Princess Areeyah as the next heirs to the throne. However, when Gino brought Yin to the program, Yin had plans of revenge against Ashi Behati. Yin accused Behati of having an allegiance to the rebels of the East, and both Yin and Behati were sent to prison. Unbeknownst to Behati, Mikay led Jao to the forest where Behati buried the medallion and Jao eventually found out the truth about his true heritage. The King was enraged when he realized that Behati had been the one to murder the Queen and sentenced both Jao and Behati to death, but Princess Areeyah pleaded with the king to lower their sentence. The King decided to let them live and be thrown to a place called Gulag, a place where they will become laborers and work for Yangdon.

Jao and Behati are heading towards Gulag when Jao is caught and beaten half-dead, while Behati is shot down and presumed dead. Jao falls unconscious and is helped by Shivaji (Arthur Acuna). Princess Areeyah is devastated and does not eat or sleep due to devastation. Nagaiel, a friend of Gino's late father Dasho Kencho, tells Gino that he is the only person the Princess can rely on during her depression. Jao wakes up from his injuries and realizes he is taken to the Philippines where he was brought in by one of the citizens of the East Kingdom named Salve (Ces Quesada). He also finds out that he is in Santol Village, also called "Yangdon of the Philippines", a place where citizens of the East Kingdom who escaped from Yangdon were living peacefully without any worries of getting caught. The Drukpah Ministers decide to choose Dasho Yuan (Gino) as the Dasho that the Princess should marry. However, during the dispute, Mikay suddenly appears and accepts Gino as her next fiancé. Jao learns that it was Shivaji who saved him from going to the Gulag and is slowly poisoned by his feelings towards King Anand and Mikay and all the Citizens of the West Kingdom. Jao eventually meets his own kin, Lara (Akiko Solon), a Santol girl who has a crush on him.

King Anand assigns Gino to do everything for Mikay to make her happy. Gino plans to give Mikay a chance to spend Christmas with her family in the Philippines. Meanwhile, Alicia and her husband Edward return from the United States with an adopted child named Angelo. When Mikay finds out about this, she is devastated and decides to plan him a little surprise. She pretends to steal his shades and lead him into a garden decorated to look like a hotdog stand, wearing the blue bear suit that Gino wore when they went to Enchanted Kingdom. Gino is touched and forgives Mikay, as she tells him that she does not ever want him to think that he is just for rebound. Mikay assures her sisters that she will no longer hurt Gino's feelings and eventually both Mikay and Gino become closer and Mikay is able to smile once again.

Gino and Mikay hold an outreach program to help the needy people in Santol Village. Unbeknownst to Gino, Jao, who still has a grudge against the West, sees him and gets mad. Gino proposes for marriage, making a long speech and singing her a song. Mikay accepts, but Jao is watching from afar and witnesses the proposal. Gino visits Santol Village and learns that Jao is actually in the village. Mikay accepts Gino's apology and decides to spend Christmas in the village to make Jao happy. Mikay gives Jao a flute as her Christmas gift, but she soon realizes that Jao is starting to change. They get into a fight and Mikay promises to never come back to the village again. Inside Jao's heart, he is happy to see the princess but thinking about what Shivaji told him, and Jao throws away the flute given by Mikay.

The next day Jao learns about a soccer tournament and decides to let the kids of Santol enter the tournament, so he tries to earn money for the kids. Meanwhile, Gino and Mikay try to build a new outreach program, considering they could not go into Santol anymore, but they could not think of a way. One day, Gino secretly goes to the Santol Village just to make a proper farewell with his brother. He also does not tell Mikay about going back to the village because he wants Mikay to move on. But realizing about Jao's current behavior and his hatred, Gino decides to stay, also with the convincing of Aling Salve. Eventually Gino also learns about the soccer tournament and helps the kids to enter and became their team manager.

Meanwhile, Mikay who was suspicious about Gino decides to follow him. While following Gino she stumbled upon a crying kid who was also from Santol Village and a competitor of the soccer tournament. He was crying because his foot was wounded, and she decides to help him. Mikay also met an old man who was known as Amang and helps them. Amang is also the head of Santol Village who was responsible for bringing the citizens of the East kingdom to the Philippines. He also recognizes Mikay as Princess Areeyah and tells her about the fact that they are from the East Kingdom and explained their situation. He begged her to not leave them because he wants their own country to recognize them. Mikay gave her word and promised him that she would definitely fulfill it. Later Mikay sees Gino and learns about the soccer tournament and the fact that Jao is their coach. Mikay eventually accepts Gino's apology and also tells Gino about her conversation with Amang and they promise to each other that they are partners, and that they will stick together. And that even though Jao is in the village, they will help it, as it is their duty as a Dasho and a princess.

As Jao feels irritation towards Mikay and Gino, he gets angry at Gino for buying the kids new slippers and did everything to get rid of Mikay and Gino. He also refuses the help they offer to him. Jao also talks to Shivaji about the tournament, but Shivaji reminded him why did he had brought Jao to the Masantol village, that that nonsense was none of his concern. Left with no choice, Jao accepted Gino's help, but his behavior was getting worse. Jao starts to become immodest and imprudent towards Mikay and Gino. And soon Gino finally snaps when he sees Jao mistreating Mikay and punches him right in the face, ensuing a quarrel between the two brothers.

Meanwhile, in an unknown place somewhere in Yangdon, it is revealed that Ashi Behati somehow faked her own death, and everything was for Jao to give his trust to the rebels, lying about her death to make him mad at the people of the West. Behati and her followers are already making their plans for taking the West kingdom and make Anand and Areeyah pay for what they did.

At the Maghirang household, Mikay learns about the fact that her father King Anand is scheduled to come at the Philippines. And because of this they devise a plan of how to tell the King about Santol.

Back at the Santol Village, Shivaji visits and asks Jao about making their move, and reminds him of being the next King. He also asks Jao about any trouble he may have been having but Jao did not dare tell Shivaji about Mikay because he is still concerned about her. Later Salve tries to comfort Jao and help him be honest with his own feelings.

Meanwhile, back at the rest house, Gino and Mikay also realize about Jao's feelings. So Dinoy tells Mikay to not hasten her decisions so she would not hurt both Jao and Gino's feelings. Mikay also decides to not break the promise she made to Amang. So, Gino is left with no choice and decides to go along with Mikay but assures that he would not let Jao hurt Mikay any longer. Mikay only nodding in agreement.

Upon their return to Santol they see Jao telling the villagers that even if Mikay and Gino would not return, they would make their own living and prove that they can do anything. Mikay upon hearing this tells them that they are not the type of people who would give up so easily. She then holds Gino's hand for support. Then Jao who notices this becomes annoyed and pretty much jealous, which leads to him walking out. With this Mikay and Gino follow him. She tells Jao to be tell them everything that happened to him and to be honest with himself. Jao becomes even more angry. But Mikay tells Jao that they will not stop helping the villagers just for him. That night, Jao becomes enraged at Mikay for not knowing about the incident that happened to his mother. But at the same time, Jao, left with no choice, decides to help them with their project. Both Gino and Mikay happily enjoys themselves with the villagers. Mikay sees Jao and watches him from a distance and walk away. Mikay could not easily disregard Jao because he was once close to her too and she hopes there's still kindness left in his heart. Gino, misinterpreting what he saw, felt devastated after he did everything so that Mikay would focus her attention to himself, but to no avail.

Shivaji goes back to Santol Village and tells Jao that the Eastern Kingdom needs his leadership as their King and tells him that they should kidnap the Princess so that they can bring Anand down to his knees, for they know that Areeyah is Anand's weakness. But Jao admits that he is not ready to fulfill his duty as their King.

The next day Mikay and Gino continues to help the village, and Jao, who thought about what Shivaji had told him about kidnapping Areeyah, was forced to tell the whole Village about Mikay's true identity as the Princess of Yangdon, to force Mikay to leave the village. Mikay however explained to the villagers her intention of bringing them back to Yangdon but the Eastern Villagers, remembering what Mikay's family did to them, tells Mikay to get lost. Gino however gets angry after learning that it was Jao who told them about Mikay's true identity. Because of this Gino blackmails Mikay into leaving Yangdon with him or else he would tell King Anand about their situation.

Mikay did not listen to Gino and still went to the Santol Village to prove to them that she believes that the East and West can still be united. But the villagers except Salve, Jao and Amang closed their hearts and stoned Mikay helplessly and she collapses due to her injuries, with Jao only looking at the princess without even helping her. Gino soon comes to her aid, and Salve scolds Jao for not doing anything and allowing the people who cared for him treat her with such cruelty. Jao realizes what he has done and all he wanted was to avoid Mikay getting hurt. As for Mikay, she is taken to the hospital to treat her injuries. Because of the incident, Gino was forced to tell the King about their situation and the King orders Gino to bring the princess back to Yangdon immediately. As Mikay is resting in her hospital room, Jao disguises himself as a nurse to apologize to Mikay. Mikay only half awake, sees Jao but did not mind him. By the second time she is still half awake, thinking Jao still there she mistakenly calls Gino "Jao" which ended with Gino getting hurt even more.

Mikay is healed from her injuries and wants to continue to convince the Villagers of Santol Village. Gino snaps and calls Mikay a fool for allowing herself to be hurt, and Jao is the one who is hurting her the most. Mikay tries to talk to him, but he only brushes her away. The next day, Mikay tries to talk to Gino, but he still remains cold towards her and is even thrifty with his words. Jao discovers that the Santol kids were not anymore allowed to play in the tournament and assumes that the reason for this was the King. He stomps into the rest house where Mikay and Gino are staying and snaps at them for pulling the kids out of the tournament. Mikay and Gino try to defend themselves and tell Jao that they did nothing to pull the kids out, but Jao is not convinced and swears to them that he will bring them down, not knowing that it was his own mother who had the kids out of the tournament.

Gino still continues to be cold towards Mikay. He does not even budge whenever Mikay tries to talk to him. He only has a poker face on and only talks to her whenever needed, but still very cold to her. It had seemed the old bad boy Gino was back. Gino is also always out of the house. And he returns always late at night. Mikay continues to try to make up with him, to no avail. Unknown to her, Gino is actually already finding ways to get the kids back in the tournament. He saves his money, and even sells his things just to find money for the kids to play. One night Gino returns in the middle of the night and finds Mikay asleep on the couch. When she wakes up, he only stares at her, without a single emotion on his face. They get into a spat, and once again Mikay is left hurt.

The story continues and Shivaji invites Jao to the meeting with very important people of the Eastern Kingdom. His mother, Ashi Behati shows up with Dorji, but was hiding, she just wanted to witness what was going on from afar. There he meets Priam, and he reveals to Jao that he is his biological father. For proof, Priam hands Jao a letter that Ashi Behati wrote while she was pregnant with Jao. Ashi married Dasho Kencho so Jao would not be stripped from his title. Ashi Behati did not love Dasho Kencho, she only loved Priam.

Gino calls his mother and tells her that he would like to stay in America with her and their family. Alicia asks why, and Gino reveals that he was acting cold towards Mikay. Jao agrees with Shivaji to kidnap Princess Areeyah, so he comes up with a way to get the Princess alone. While setting up for a birthday party, Jao, Gino and Mikay go buy cake. Jao tricks them and takes them to an empty house to pick up the birthday present. Gino keeps pushing Mikay away as he stays away, and Mikay and Jao gets into a shed due to the heavy rain. Jao reveals that he still loves Mikay, and he hopes she still feels the same way. Mikay reveals that Gino never gave up on her and that it hurts her that they are not in good terms. Mikay then comes to Gino as he continues to push her away from Jao. Gino walks away from Mikay as Jao, being heartbroken, calls Shivaji and tells him what location they are at. Gino overhears Jao's phone call conversation and punches Jao. When Jao goes near them, they ask him why he is doing this to them. Jao screams out, "you are not my brother, I am a full blood of the Eastern Kingdom."

Mikay and Gino eventually escaped from the raging Jao and left to go back home to Yangdon. As King Anand, Mikay and Gino were having a conversation, Mikay happily tells King Anand about their future plans. She then leaves Gino and Anand for a bit, to change clothes. Gino then told Anand that he only went to Yangdon to send the princess safely back to her father and told the King that he is about to leave and go to America without telling Mikay. Gino leaves and when Mikay found out about it, she was devastated as she tried to chase him. They see each other at the airport and Mikay cries as she asks Gino to stay with her, reminding him of their promise. She reassures him they could start anew for she cannot make it without him, not anymore. However, Gino stood firm with his decision and leaves Mikay, although it is against his will as he still loves her so much. Both were in tears as they parted ways.

Yangdon is then turned to chaos by Behati. King Anand is taken prisoner and Mikay had to run and hide even before reaching the palace. Meanwhile, Gino hears of this and immediately goes back to find Mikay. Mikay tries to contact Gino over the phone in the hopes that he still has not left. Gino gets the call from Mikay and told her to hide to a safe place as he promised to look for her and find her.

He finds Mikay, scared and hiding in the forest and Gino promises to never leave Mikay again. The two spend the evening hiding behind a tree, away from any of the Silangan. In the morning, they are found by Sivaji, their hopes were up because they thought Sivaji was there to save them, but they find out that Sivaji is no more than a traitor. Gino tells Mikay to run away as he fights against Sivaji and the guards, but Gino gets beaten and taken as hostage in the palace.

Mikay is found by a trusted member of the West and is taken to safety with the rest of the West. Priam is shot dead. Despite Mikay's requests to look for Gino and her father, she is told to stay strong because a lot of her people need help from lack of food and injuries.

As Gino's injuries get worse and is suffering more and more in prison, the members of the Drukpah beg for the guards to help him but in instead Jao comes. Jao gets the guards to take Gino's shirt off.

Mikay travels from city to city in Yangdon offering help to her suffering people. Jao travels to one of these cities and tells the people to give something to Mikay. Mikay notices a blood-stained white tee shirt that is Gino's and broadcasts a worldwide speech about what is happening and Yangdon. Mikay accepts Jao's proposal in return for Gino and her father's welfare and for the East and West Kingdoms to be able to finally get together. Gino and Mikay spend their last night together full of love and happiness and make promises to each other by lighting floating lanterns in the sky. When the day of the wedding comes, Gino escorts Mikay to Jao, but when Jao has to say his vows, he realizes that everything is wrong and calls for the wedding to stop. Behati enraged gets a gun out and says that Mikay has to die, but Gino steps in front of her and when the gun is fired, both Gino and Jao collapse to the ground.

Jao is the one who got shot and Behati goes mad, realizing what she has done. Behati is taken to prison and Jao turns out to be alive as a monk and it is revealed that he is the "I" as he tells his story to children. The West and East get together, fulfilling Mikay's dream, and it is seen that the East Kingdom were welcomed to the palace to meet King Anand and Mikay. Mikay and Gino are now engaged and the people in the palace happily cheers as the two were about to kiss as the show ends.

== Cast ==
=== Main cast ===
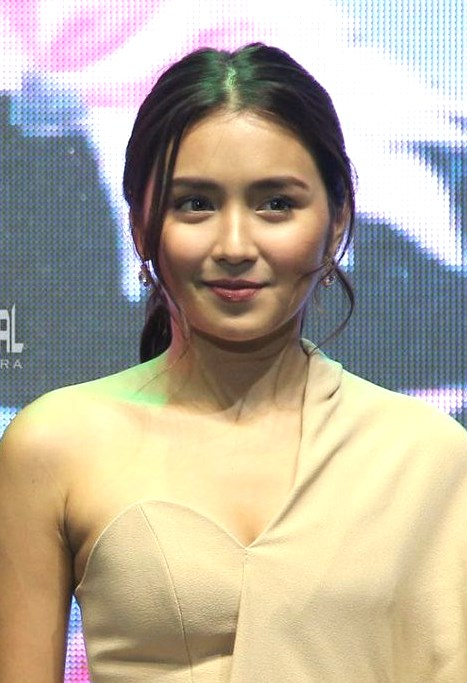
Kathryn Bernardo as Mikay Maghirang-Dela Rosa / Princess Areeyah Wangchuck-Rinpoche

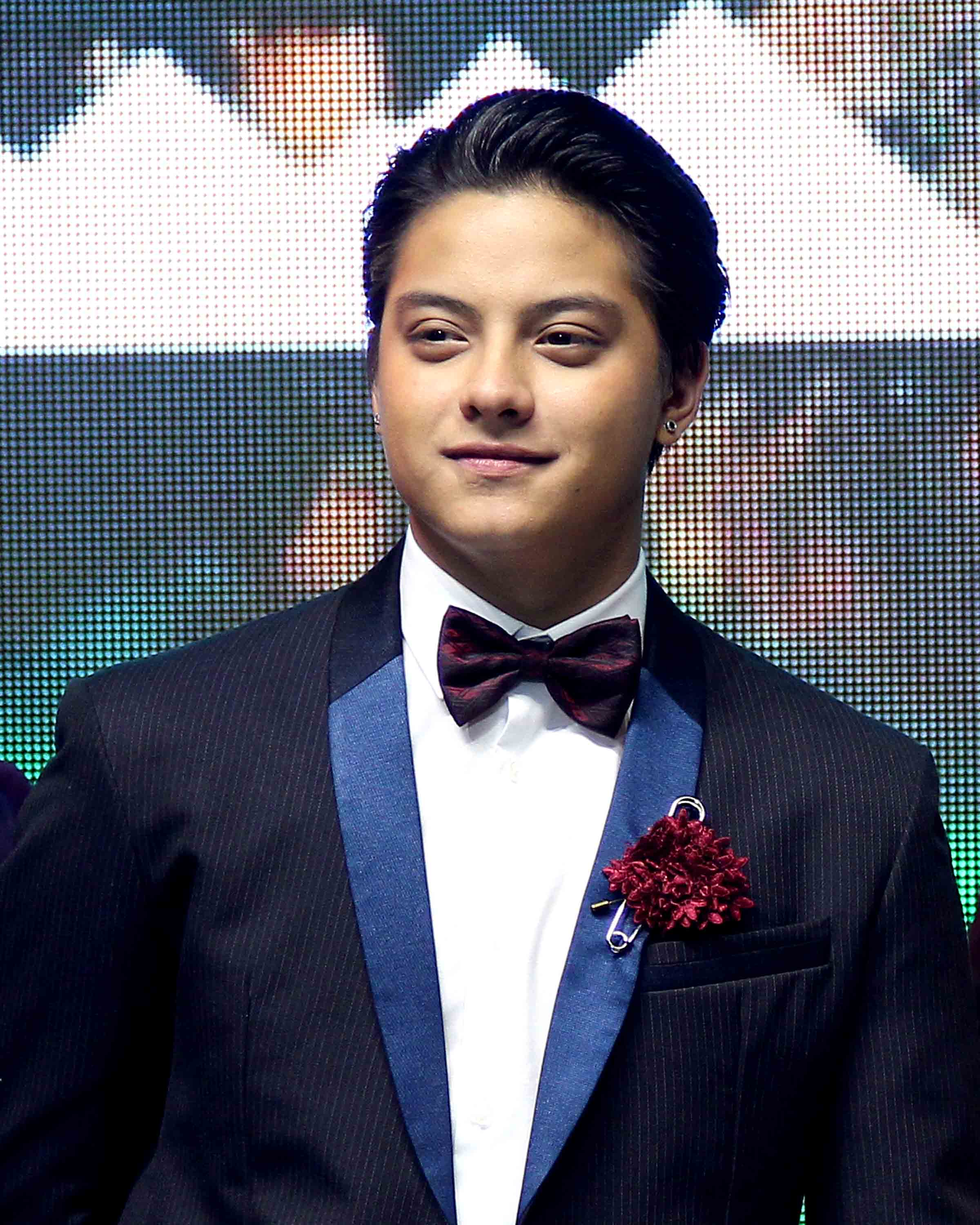
Daniel Padilla as Gino Dela Rosa / Dasho Yuan Rinpoche

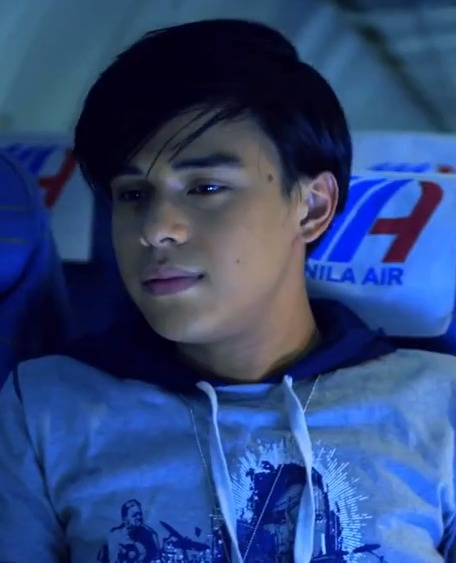
Khalil Ramos as Martin Nikolas "Kiko" Salamat

- Kathryn Bernardo as Maria Mikaela "Mikay" Maghirang-Dela Rosa / Princess Areeyah Wangchuck-Rinpoche
- Daniel Padilla as Gerald Antonio "Gino" Dela Rosa / Dasho Yuan Rinpoche
- Enrique Gil as Dasho Jan Alfonso "Jao" Rinpoche
- Khalil Ramos as Martin Nikolas "Kiko" Salamat

=== Supporting cast ===
- Albert Martinez as King Anand Wangchuck
- Gretchen Barretto as Ashi Behati Rinpoche
- Dominic Ochoa as Danilo "Dinoy" Maghirang
- Sharmaine Suarez as Esmeralda "Esme" Ortiz
- Niña Dolino as Yin Hwan Dee
- Karen Timbol as Stella Cruz-Maghirang
- Yayo Aguila as Des Salamat
- Beverly Salviejo as Anna Salamat
- Frances Ignacio as Ellen Salamat
- Marina Benipayo as Alicia de la Rosa
- Jong Cuenco as Edward de la Rosa
- Shey Bustamante as Vicky Ortiz
- Bianca Casado as Bianca C. Maghirang
- Sofia Andres as Dindi C. Maghirang
- Maxine Misa as Steph
- Roeder Camañag as Ambet
- Allen Dizon as Pratchit

=== Extended cast ===
- RS Francisco as Dorji
- Young JV as Jonas de Ocampo
- DM Sevilla as Romeo
- Nina Ricci Alagao as Drukpah Minister Chumi
- Arthur Acuna as Drukpah Minister Shivaji
- Jerry O'Hara as Drukpah Minister Bibek
- Levy Ignacio as Drukpah Minister Razza
- Jonic Magno as Drukpah Minister Anash
- Ian Galliguez as Drukpah Minister Noime Capul
- Heidi Arima as Drukpah Minister Karuna
- Mimi Orara as Drukpah Minister Rasha
- Jojo de Castro as Drukpah Minister Prashan
- Justin Cuyugan as Drukpah Minister Laksam
- Minco Fabregas as Dr. Ramon Santos
- Lynn Oeymo as Maggie
- Kyra Custodio as Bianca's friend
- Auriette Divina as Bianca's friend

=== Guest cast ===
- Angeline Quinto as herself
- Jillian Ward as Jecha
- Joseph Marco as Dasho Kim Methra
- Piero Vergara as Dasho Rio
- John Manalo as Dasho Pema
- Javy Gil as Dasho Ken Sarivijal
- Yves Flores as Dasho Samdrup
- Alec Dungo as Dasho Chopel
- Justin Gonzales as Dasho Arden
- Joe Vargas as Dasho Boochan
- Bryan Santos as Dasho Randel
- Phytos Ramirez as Dasho Pelden (credited as "Phytos Kyriacou")
- Jaco Benin as Dasho Kinley
- Simon Ibarra as Nagaiel
- EJ Jallorina as Tom
- Ces Quesada as Salve
- Akiko Solon as Lara
- Kiray as Janella / Hae Dong-young

=== Special participation ===
- Precious Lara Quigaman as Queen Isabel Wangchuck
- Dante Rivero as Former King Maja Raja Wangchuck
- Christian Vasquez as Dasho Kencho Rinpoche
- Christian Bautista as Priam
- Spanky Manikan as King Chen Mo
- Casey Da Silva as Young Mikay Maghirang-Dela Rosa / Princess Areeyah Wangchuck-Rinpoche
- Russiane Jandris Ilao as Young Gino Dela Rosa / Yuan Rinpoche
- Louise Abuel as Young Jao Rinpoche
- Jelo Echaluce as Young Kiko Salamat
- Belinda Mariano as Young Bianca Maghirang

== Production ==
Princess and I, then coming as working title You're Always in my Heart, was announced during an ABS-CBN trade event as one of the upcoming television series of the network to be shown on primetime. After the success of her previous show Mara Clara, the project was given to teen star Kathryn Bernardo as her counterpart Julia Montes was given the lead role for another show, Walang Hanggan.

On March 31, 2012 on the network's primetime newscast TV Patrol, the show was formally announced as Princess and I and will be shown April 16, taking the timeslot of the concluding television show E-boy. Along with Kathryn, other teen actors to star include her Growing Up onscreen team-up partner Daniel Padilla, Pilipinas Got Talent Season 3 Finalist Khalil Ramos, and Enrique Gil, whom she co-starred with in the movie Way Back Home.

Albert Martinez and Precious Lara Quigaman were announced to be the royal parents of Bernardo's character. Gretchen Barretto also joins the cast after her previously announced project Alta was shelved. Other cast announced include Dominic Ochoa, Yayo Aguila, Niña Dolino, and Sharmaine Suarez. Primetime first-timer Dado Lumibao and My Binondo Girl director Francis Xavier Pasion are hired as directors for the show. Star Television will produce the television series. Star Television is the small-screen production arm of Star Cinema, the biggest film production firm in the Philippines, and the makers of primetime hits such as Pangako Sa 'Yo, Imortal, and Magkaribal.

In an interview, Bernardo said that it was an unforgettable experience to shoot abroad in what is anticipated to be one of ABS-CBN's biggest and grandest teleseryes for 2012. Since the story revolves around a fictional rich kingdom in Asia, costume and prop designers were hired to create authentic but stylized and evidently Bhutanese-influenced costumes that were fit for royalty. Notably also, to make the fictional kingdom seem more authentic, while shooting, actors portraying Yangdonese characters had to learn how to deliver their lines in Dzongkha, the language of the Bhutanese, and they would dub themselves in post editing. The cast and crew also had to fly to Bhutan to shoot scenes for the show. It took them two weeks to finish shooting in Bhutan, and they continued shooting in the Philippines after they arrived. However, in some scenes where there is in need to portray Bhutan, production was made using green screen technology. Bernardo said it has helped her character that she looks like the princess of Bhutan, and that it would help the viewers appreciate the show more.

The full trailer was released on April 2, 2012 via the primetime series Walang Hanggan. Soon after, the trailer became a top trending topic nationwide on Twitter. Two days later, the official poster was released.

== International broadcast ==
- Philippines: MyTv

== Reception ==
KANTAR MEDIA NATIONAL HOUSEHOLD TV RATINGS (07:45PM PST)
PILOT EPISODE	FINALE EPISODE	PEAK	AVERAGE	SOURCE
31.7%	38.1%	40.6% (June 25, 2012)		

== Awards and recognitions ==
Year	Award-giving body	Category	Result
2012	ASAP Pop Viewer's Choice Awards 2012	Pop Soundtrack	Won
2012	ASAP Pop Viewer's Choice Awards 2012	Pop Kapamilya TV Show	Won

== Soundtrack ==
The Princess and I OST soundtrack was released in three parts under Star Records, led by the show's themesong, Nag-Iisang Bituin by Christian Bautista. The second single, Hinahanap Hanap Kita by Daniel Padilla was released on May 1 followed by the show's third single, Kung Ako Ba Siya by Khalil Ramos on May 3.

Love Songs from Princess and I

Soundtrack album by Various artists
- Released: June 15, 2012
- Recorded: 2012
- Genres: OPM, Pop
- Length: 56:43
- Label: Star Records

No.	Title	Artist	Length
1.	"Nag-Iisang Bituin"	Christian Bautista	3:54
2.	"Hinahanap Hanap Kita"	Daniel Padilla	4:04
3.	"Kung Ako Ba Siya"	Khalil Ramos	3:30
4.	"Mula Noon Hanggang Ngayon"	Kathryn Bernardo	3:58
5.	"Tunay Na Ligaya"	Enrique Gil	3:37
6.	"Now We're Together"	Khalil Ramos	3:03
7.	"Gusto Kita"	Daniel Padilla, Khalil Ramos and Enrique Gil	3:29
8.	"Nag-Iisang Bituin"	Angeline Quinto	4:07

Additional tracks (minus one)
No.	Title	Artist	Length
1.	"Nag-Iisang Bituin (instrumental)"	Christian Bautista	3:54
2.	"Hinahanap Hanap Kita (instrumental)"	Daniel Padilla	4:05
3.	"Kung Ako Ba Siya (instrumental)"	Khalil Ramos	3:30
4.	"Mula Noon Hanggang Ngayon (instrumental)"	Kathryn Bernardo	3:58
5.	"Tunay Na Ligaya (instrumental)"	Enrique Gil	3:37
6.	"Now We're Together (instrumental)"	Khalil Ramos	3:03
7.	"Gusto Kita (instrumental)"	Daniel Padilla, Khalil Ramos and Enrique Gil	3:29
8.	"Nag-Iisang Bituin (instrumental)"	Angeline Quinto	4:05

== See also ==
- List of programs broadcast by ABS-CBN
- List of ABS-CBN Studios original drama series
