= Kayla Rivera =

Canadian singer

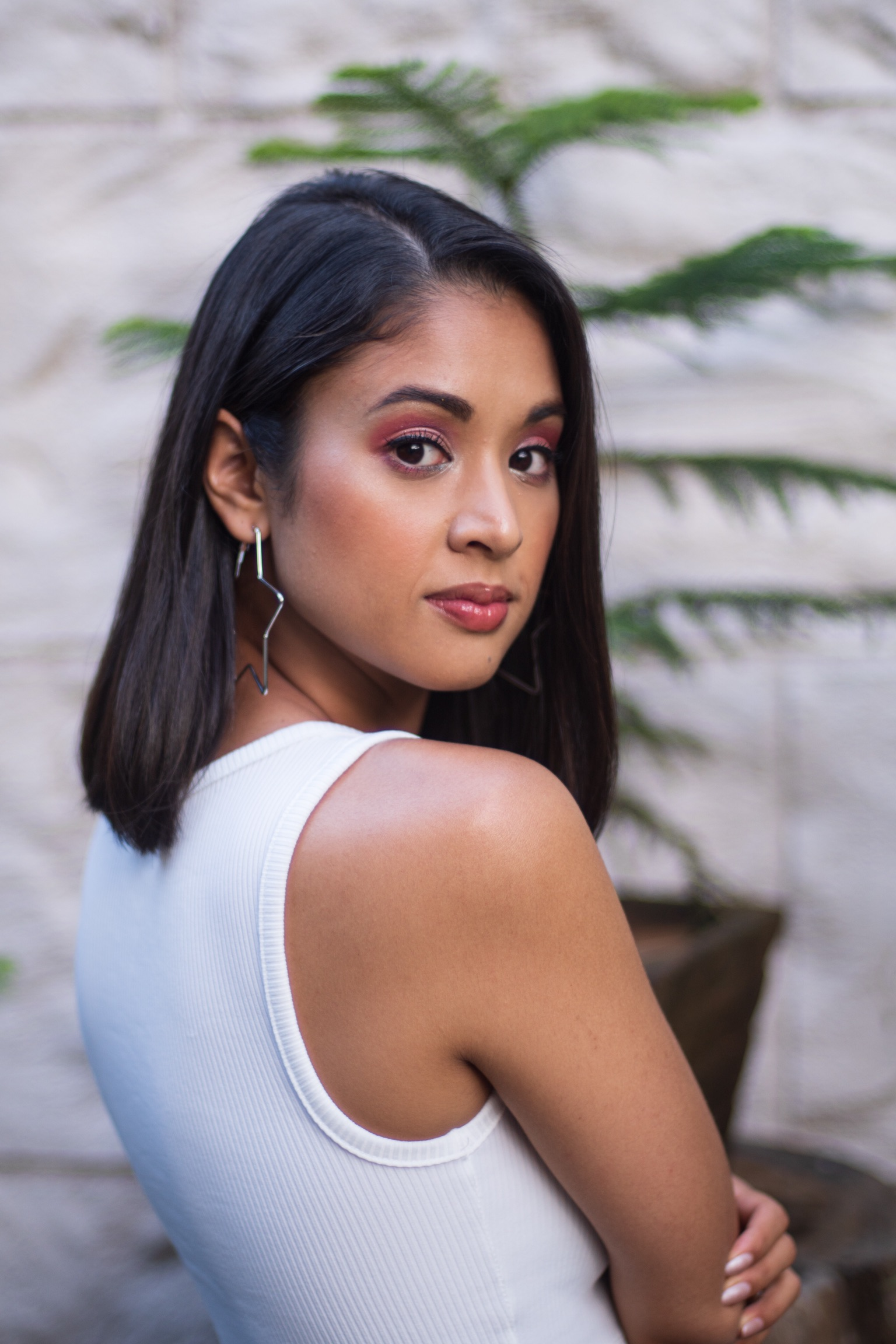
- Rivera in 2021

Background information
- Born: Kayla Meagan Iovan; August 13, 1991 (age 34); Calgary, Alberta, Canada
- Genres: Pop, R&B, musical theater, jazz, praise and worship
- Occupations: Singer, actress
- Instruments: Vocals, piano
- Years active: 2010–present
- Labels: Underdog Music, Star Music, Western Star Promotions

Kayla Meagan Iovan (born August 13, 1991), known by her stage name Kayla Rivera (formerly K-LA Rivera and Kaye) is a Canadian and Filipino singer and actress appearing both in theater and television in the Philippines, best recognized for being a grand finalist of Star Power (2010–2011) and playing the title role in Atlantis Theatrical's: Beautiful – The Carole King Musical. Rivera is furthermore a recording artist, songwriter, model, host, video jockey, and voice teacher. Rivera is currently the "Headhunter" of POPinoy, a television show airing on TV5. She also performs on the noontime variety show "Eat Bulaga" and is under the management of All Access to Artists, Inc.

== Early life ==
At age 13, The Young Canadians (TYC) School of Performing Arts chose Rivera to be among their members where she trained both vocally and dancing (jazz and ballet) year-round, in preparation for nightly performances at the Grandstand show, at the Calgary Stampede.

When Rivera was 16, she auditioned for Canadian Idol in Calgary, and making it through initial auditions, she flew to Toronto and made it to the Top 65. That same year she was a co-winner of the David Foster Star Search (September 2007) and performed at the Jack Singer Concert Hall with David Foster. Later that month, Rivera was sent to Halifax, NS, to perform at the kickoff for the David Foster Star Search held in March. She also worked with David Foster at various events around Canada, including an appearance on Canada AM to promote the 2010 Olympics held in Vancouver, British Columbia.

== Career ==
In 2010 Rivera, appearing as K-La Rivera, became a part of Star Power from ABS-CBN.

On July 27, 2011, Rivera emerged as one of the finalists of the MYX VJ SEARCH and was one of three winners announced at SM North Edsa – The Block. She then began her career as VJ from 2011 to 2012.

In September 2011, Rivera made her professional stage debut in the local adaptation of the acclaimed Broadway musical In the Heights under Atlantis Production. She played the role of "Nina Rosario" alongside seasoned performers, namely Nyoy Volante, Jackie Lou Blanco, and Ima Castro. Rivera received her first nomination as "Best Actress in a Musical" at the Aliw Awards.

Rivera was chosen to sing the theme song “I’m Feeling Sexy Tonight”, of the movie “Adventures of Pureza” which was released on July 4, 2011. Months later on March 16, 2012, Rivera released her first self-titled Album (K-LA) under Star Music Records. Included in her 5-track album are Inseparable, Love Has Come My Way, Say That You Love Me, Someone's Always Saying Goodbye, and You're All That I Need.

In November 2012, following her success in the musical play "In the Heights," Rivera was selected by Atlantis Productions to play Princess Jasmine in the Manila staging of Disney's Aladdin.

In October 2013, Rivera created a buzz in the theater community after learning and taking on the lead role of Carrie White in less than a week. When lead star Mikkie Bradshaw-Volante fell ill after the Friday opening night of Atlantis Productions' staging of "Carrie,". Rivera went on earning her second nomination as "Best Actress in Musical Theater” at the Broadway World Philippines.

In November 2013, Rivera portrayed the role of Wednesday Addams in The Addams Family, a Broadway Musical staged by Atlantis Productions.

In February 2014, Rivera moved from ABS-CBN to GMA, specifically being co-managed by Maristel Fernandez and GMA Artist Center (GMAAC). With this move came a new screen name, Kaye. Rivera then started performing on the noontime show Sunday All-Stars. Rivera also appeared semi-regularly on the TV series Carmella and other various GMA shows.

In Aug 2014, Rivera made her big-screen debut in the film "S6Parados" under a Cinemalaya production directed by GB Sampedro. S6parados was based on true stories of the partly tragic saga of six men who separated from their wives. She played the girlfriend of one of the main cast members.

In October 2014, Rivera starred in Rock of Ages, a jukebox musical that tells the story of the two young dreamers, Drew and Sherrie. Portraying the role of "Sherrie Christian" who dreamt of a career in Hollywood but worked as a stripper while in the pursuit of her dreams, this enabled Rivera to stretch out of the more conservative roles she had previously played, and into a more sexy role

In August 2018, Atlantis Theatrical Entertainment Group cast Rivera to play the lead role of "Violet Hilton" together with Gab Pangilinan (Daisy Hilton) in "Side Show" (true story of the famous conjoined twins). Rivera was nominated again as "Best Actress in Musical" at Broadway World Philippines.

On April 25, 2019, Rivera concluded her four-year degree course Bachelor of Arts in communications, minor in Economics at the University of Calgary (Canada).

In June 2019, included in the special line-up of shows in celebration of Atlantis Theatrical Group's 20th Anniversary, was “Beautiful: The Carole King Musical” where Rivera starred as the title role.

In February 2020, Rivera joined Sam Concepcion (as Joseph) in the much-awaited return of Trumpet's most beloved production, “Joseph the Dreamer”. She played a dual role as the Narrator and Asenath (Joseph's wife).

== Notable stage credits ==
Year	Title	Role	Location	Notes
2011	In the Heights	Nina Rosario	Manila	Nominated for Best Actress (Aliw Awards)
2012	Alladin	Jasmine	Manila	
2013	Carrie White	Carrie	Manila	Nominated for Best Actress (Broadway World Philippines)
2013	The Addams Family	Wednesday Addams	Manila	
2014	Rock of Ages	Sherrie	Manila	
2018	Side Show	Violet Hilton	Manila	Nominated for Best Actress (Broadway World Philippines)
2019	Beautiful: The Carole King Musical	Carole King	Manila	
2020–2022	Joseph The Dreamer	Asenath/ Narrator	Manila	Best Lead Actress in a Musical- Aliw Awards (Won)

== Filmography and television appearances ==
Year	Show	Role	Network
2009	Wowowee	Herself	ABS-CBN
2010	Star Power	Herself	ABS-CBN
2011	ASAP	Herself	ABS-CBN
2011	Happy Yipee Yehey	Herself	ABS-CBN
2011	MYX	Video Jockey	ABS-CBN
2012	ASAP	Herself	ABS-CBN
2012	ABS-CBN News Channel	Guest	ABS-CBN
2013	ASAP	Herself	ABS-CBN
2013	Maalaala Mo Kaya	Guest	ABS-CBN
2014	Sunday All Stars	Herself	GMA
2014	Carmella	Celine	GMA
2014	Maynila	Shaira	GMA
2014	S6PERADOS	Bestfriend	Cinemalaya
2014	Mars	Guest	GTV 27
2015	Sunday Pinasaya	Guest	GMA Network
2019	It's Showtime	Herself	ABS CBN
2019	Eat Bulaga!	Herself	GMA Network
2020	Wowowin	Herself/Guest Co Host	GMA Network
2021	POPINOY	Headhunter	TV5 (formerly ABC 5)
2022	Mars Pa More	Herself/Guest	GMA Network
2023	Magpakailanman	Guest	GMA Network
2024	Barangay Singko Panalo	Host	TV5 (formerly ABC 5)
