= Krissel Valdez =

- Born: Krissel Joy Valdez; October 10, 1990 (age 35); Davao City, Philippines
- Genres: Pop
- Occupation: Singer
- Years active: 2010–present
- Labels: Star Music (2010–present); Star Magic (2010–present)

Krissel Joy Valdez (born October 10, 1990) is a Filipina–Davaoena singer and the first runner-up of Star Power: Sharon Search For the Next Female Superstar. Better known as Krissel Valdez and dubbed as "The Soulful Diva of Davao".

== Early life ==
Krissel was a member of D-Base Band, a local band in Davao.

Krissel Won the Grand Prix of European Star Rain in Prague Czech Republic . She is the first Asian and Filipina who won Grandprix in European Performing arts competition.

Krissel joined WCOPA (Worlds Championship of Performing Arts) in Hollywood California and won Silver medal in Pop Category.

Krissel was also part of the Musical Rock of Ages Re-run.

Krissel was also the Leading Lady of the World Boxer Nonito "The Filipino Flash" Donaire in the Visayan Indie Film " Palad ta ang Nagbuot ( Our Fate Decides).

== TV appearances ==
Year	Title	Role	Notes
2011–present	ASAP	Herself	Main Stay Performer/Co-Host
2011	Banana Split	Herself	Guest/Segment Player
2011	Star Power: Sharon Search For the Next Female Superstar	Herself/Contestant	2nd Place
