= Akiko Solon =

Filipino singer and actress (born 1994)

- Born: Akiko Maria Leslie Villamor Solon; January 3, 1994 (age 32); Lapu-Lapu, Philippines
- Education: University of San Jose–Recoletos
- Occupations: Singer, actress
- Years active: 2010–2015
- Agent: Star Magic (2010–2015)

Akiko Solon (born January 3, 1994, as Akiko Maria Leslie Villamor Solon) is a Filipino singer and actress. She joined Star Power: Sharon Search For the Next Female Superstar in 2010 and placed fifth in the contest. She is now currently under Star Magic.

== Early life ==
A resident of Lapu-Lapu, Akiko started singing in school events when she was a fourth grader. Her first TV exposure was as a contestant for another ABS-CBN singing tilt for kids "Little Big Star, Cebu", hosted by Sheryn Regis. Because of the exposure she got in that contest, her alma mater EMD Carmelite School Foundation INC. gave their full support for her, she received a scholarship and when she graduated in high school, she already had her own album. She took up AB Masscom at the University of San Jose-Recoletos, and was the school's grand champion in its "Josenian Got Talent" contest last year.

Then, she joined Star Power: Sharon Search For the Next Female Superstar, dubbed as "Sweet and Sexy Siren of Cebu" and landed as the fifth placer of the said reality show.

== Filmography ==
=== Television ===
Year	Title	Role
2015	Bridges of Love	Alisa
2015	Pasión De Amor	Lucy
2013	My Little Juan	
2012	Princess and I	Lara
2012	Maalaala Mo Kaya: Police Uniform	Donna
2012	Maalaala Mo Kaya: Lubid	Karen
2012	E-Boy	Ella Dela Cruz
2011	Maalaala Mo Kaya: Itak	Shieng
2011	ASAP Rocks	Herself
2011	Banana Split	Herself/Segment Player
2010	Star Power	Contestant/Herself
