= KathNiel =

Filipino acting duo

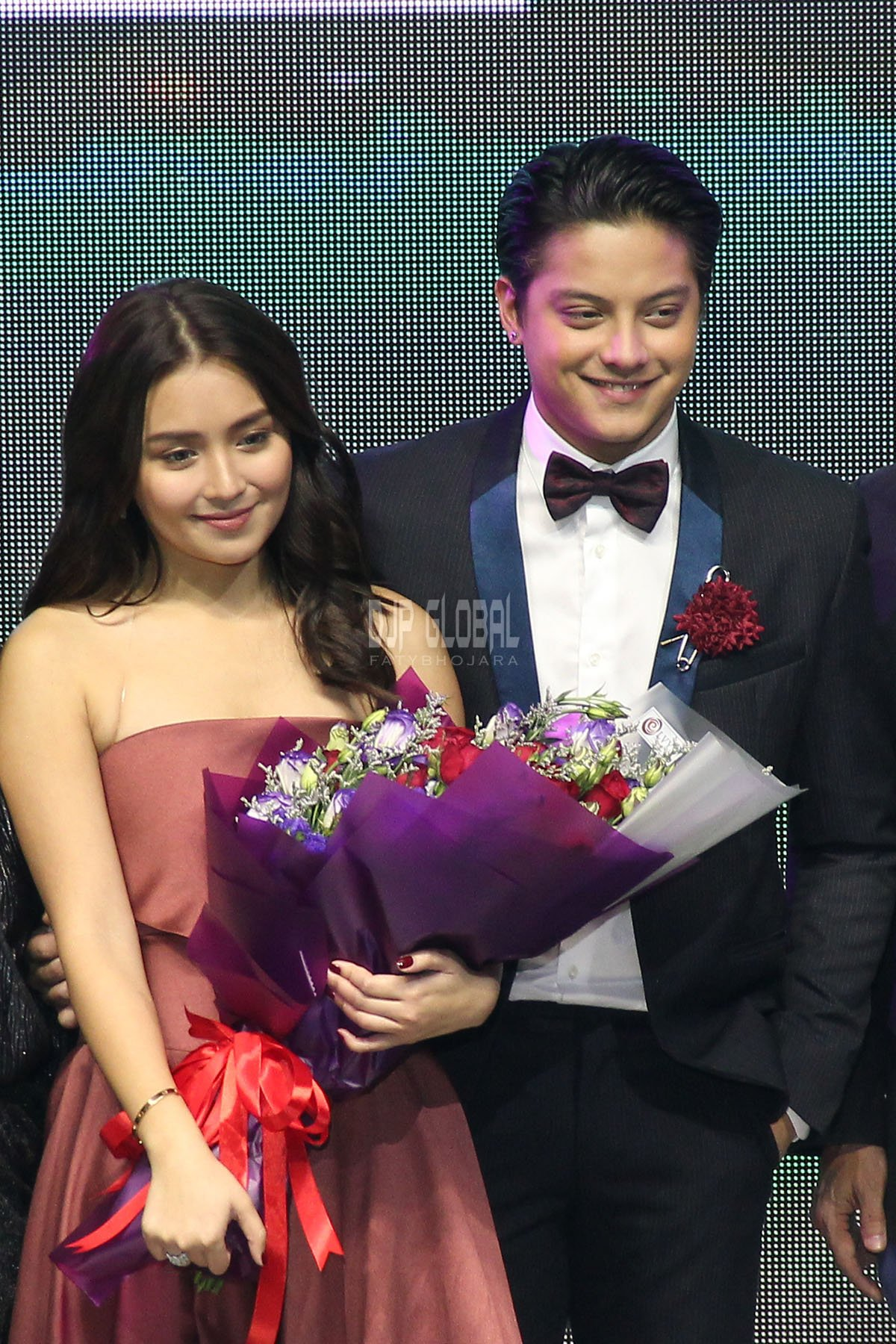
- Bernardo (left) and Padilla (right) in 2016.
- Born: Kathryn Chandria Manuel Bernardo; March 26, 1996 (aged 15–27 (Note: Age during the duration of the love team)); Cabanatuan, Nueva Ecija, Philippines Daniel John Elago Ford; April 26, 1995 (aged 16–28); Manila, Philippines
- Status: Dissolved (confirmed on November 30, 2023, Bonifacio Day)
- Other names: Kathryn Bernardo and Daniel Padilla
- Occupations: Television and film actors, singers
- Years active: 2011–2023 (Note: From first appearance together in 2011 to breakup in 2023. Romantic relations began in 2012. Acting hiatus as a love team in 2019.)
- Employer: ABS-CBN
- Notable work: See list

KathNiel was a love team (Note: Described as a "power couple" by Singaporean newspaper The Straits Times) consisting of Filipino actors Kathryn Bernardo and Daniel Padilla. Together, they appeared in several films and television series together as fictional couples. Their romantic relationship in real life was also the subject of public interest.

== History ==
=== 2011–2017: Early years ===
Kathryn Bernardo and Daniel Padilla first appeared together in the 2011 television series Growing Up. Bernardo played the role of high school student Ella, while Padilla played her classmate Patrick.

Bernardo and Padilla's romantic relationship was rumored to have begun on May 25, 2012. However, the pair never explicitly announced a relationship until much later. They would appear in their first primetime series Princess and I, where they played main leads.

Their first feature film together, 24/7 in Love, was released in November 2012. This would be followed by their first top-billed film Must Be... Love in March 2013, and their first Metro Manila Film Festival film Pagpag.

KathNiel were featured in the 2015 film Crazy Beautiful You. In the same year, they began starring in the primetime series Pangako Sa ‘Yo, a remake of the 2000s series of the same name.

In mid-2016, Bernardo and Padilla would say that they are "exclusively dating" each other but refused to publicly give any other label to their relationship. The couple would later share their first on-screen kiss in the film Barcelona: A Love Untold.

=== 2018-2019: Confirmation and hiatus ===
In August 2018, at the media launch of their film The Hows of Us, the couple officially confirmed that they have been in a romantic relationship.

Though in the same year, Bernardo said they wanted to do separate projects to advance their own careers independently but not where they would have a different on-screen partner than each other, taking into consideration the sentiment of KathNiel fans. They would mutually decide not take the same projects in both film and television for the following year.

Bernardo starred in the 2019 film Hello, Love, Goodbye alongside Alden Richards, who was part of the AlDub love team with Maine Mendoza. Hello, Love, Goodbye is currently the second highest grossing Filipino film of all time.

=== 2020–23: Return ===
KathNiel's return was planned to happen in 2020, with both actors signing a new three-year contract with ABS-CBN. This plan was disrupted by the COVID-19 pandemic and the revocation of ABS-CBN's franchise. The pandemic also caused the shelving of the supposed KathNiel film After Forever, which was supposed to be set in the United States.

The pair would reunite in the streaming series The House Arrest of Us which was first released in October 2020.

KathNiel posted their first joint vlog in Bernardo's YouTube channel for a Valentine's day video in 2021.

Their last television project together would be the 2022 series 2 Good 2 Be True. They were supposed to return in a film announced in December 2022 to be directed by Cathy Garcia-Sampana.

=== Dissolution ===
In early November 2023, talent manager Ogie Diaz claimed on his YouTube channel that an unnamed source told him that Bernardo and Padilla have already broken up. The rumors were received negatively by KathNiel fans, who branded Diaz as a "fake news peddler."

Apparently dispelling the rumors, the two appeared together at an Omega event on November 14 where they danced together.

However, during Bonifacio Day on November 30, Bernardo confirmed the end of her relationship with Padilla through her social media account, mentioning that they parted ways amicably.

Terms associated with the love team were searched heavily according to Google Trends in the Philippines following the confirmation. News of the breakup were also reported in Malaysian and Singaporean news outlets.

== Discography ==
=== Albums ===
Singles

| Year | Track | Details | Ref. |
|---|---|---|---|
| 2013 | "Got to Believe in Magic" | Album: Got to Believe (The Official Soundtrack); Related work: Got to Believe; Release date: December 10, 2013; Label: Star Music | |

=== Music videos ===
| Year | Title | Details | Ref. |
|---|---|---|---|
| 2014 | "PinaSmile" | Album: ABS-CBN Summer Station ID; Directed by: Peewee Gonzales and Paolo Ramos; Producer: Christian Faustino; Studio: ABS-CBN | |
| 2015 | "Thank You for the Love" (with Nadine Lustre, James Reid, Enrique Gil, Liza Soberano, Bamboo Mañalac and Elha Nympha) | Album: ABS-CBN Christmas Station ID; Lyrics by: Robert Labayen; Music by: Thyro Alfaro and Yumi Lacsaman; Studio: ABS-CBN | |
| 2017 | "Share The Love" (with Janella Salvador and Elmo Magalona) | Written by: Robert Labayen, Angela Suarez; Music by: Lloyd Oliver "Tiny" Corpuz; *Produced by: Raizo Chabeldin | |
| 2020 | "Sa Susunod Na Habang Buhay" | Album: Sa Susunod Na Habang Buhay; Written by: Juan Miguel Severo; Music by: Ben&Ben | |

== Filmography ==
=== Film ===
| Year | Title | Roles | | Notes |
| Year | Title | Kathryn Bernardo | Daniel Padilla | Notes |
|---|---|---|---|---|
| 2012 | 24/7 in Love | Jane Dela Cuesta | Billy Fernandez | |
| 2013 | Must Be... Love | Patricia Espinosa | Ivan Lacson | First top-billed roles |
| 2013 | Pagpag: Siyam na Buhay | Leni Dela Torre | Cedric Castillo | First horror film, first Metro Manila Film Festival entry |
| 2014 | She's Dating the Gangster | Athena Dizon | Kenji Delos Reyes | Portrayal of two different set of teenage characters. Athena and Kenji were portrayed by different actors as adults. |
| 2014 | She's Dating the Gangster | Kelay Dizon | Kenneth Delos Reyes | Portrayal of two different set of teenage characters. Athena and Kenji were portrayed by different actors as adults. |
| 2015 | Crazy Beautiful You | Jackie Serrano | Kiko Alcantara | |
| 2016 | Barcelona: A Love Untold | Mia Dela Torre | Ely Antonio | First on-screen kissing scene |
| 2017 | Can't Help Falling in Love | Gab De La Cuesta | Dos Gonzalez Jr. | |
| 2018 | The Hows of Us | Georgina Reyes | Primo Alvarez | |

=== Television ===
| Year | Title | Roles | | Notes |
| Year | Title | Kathryn Bernardo | Daniel Padilla | Notes |
|---|---|---|---|---|
| 2011 | Growing Up | Mikaella Dimalanta | Patrick Rivero | |
| 2012–2013 | Princess and I | Mikay Maghirang | Gino Dela Rosa | |
| 2013–2014 | Got to Believe | Chichay Tampipi | Joaquin Manansala / Ryan | |
| 2015–2016 | Pangako Sa 'Yo | Yna Macaspac | Angelo Buenavista | Originally by Kristine Hermosa and Jericho Rosales |
| 2017–2018 | La Luna Sangre | Malia Rodriguez | Tristan Torralba | |
| 2020–2021 | The House Arrest of Us | Queencess "Q" Capili | Enrico "Korics" de Guzman | |
| 2022 | 2 Good 2 Be True | Ali Fajardo | Eloy Borja | |
