= List of awards and nominations received by Enrique Gil =

Enrique Gil awards and nominations
Awards and nominations
Award	Wins	Nominations
ALTA Media Icon Awards	3	3
Anak TV Awards	3	3
ASAP Pop Viewers' Choice Awards	1	12
ASAP Pop Teen Choice Awards	4	8
Awit Awards	-	4
Candy Readers' Choice Awards	1	3
Centro Escolar University Mass Communication Awards for Media and the Arts	1	1
EdukCircle Awards	4	9
FAMAS Awards	1	2
Gawad PASADO Awards	2	2
GMMSF Box-Office Entertainment Awards	6	6
Golden Laurel: LPU Batangas Media Awards	2	2
Illumine Innovation Awards for Television	2	2
Myx Music Awards	-	2
Nickelodeon Kids' Choice Awards	-	1
Paragala: The Central Luzon Media Awards	2	3
PMPC Star Awards for Movies	-	3
PMPC Star Awards For Music	-	1
PMPC Star Awards for Television	1	3
Push Awards	7	16
Sine Sandaan	1	1
Star Cinema Online Awards	4	10
The EDDYS	-	1
The PEP List Awards	-	1
Tonight with Boy Abunda: 1st Abundant Awards	2	2
VP Choice Awards	-	1
Yahoo! Philippines OMG! Awards	2	2

Totals (Note: Certain award groups do not simply award one winner. They acknowledge several different recipients, have runners-up, and have third place. Since this is a specific recognition and is different from losing an award, runner-up mentions are considered wins in this award tally. For simplification and to avoid errors, each award in this list has been presumed to have had a prior nomination.)
- Wins: 48
- Nominations: 56

This is a list of awards, nominations, recognitions and achievements received by Enrique Gil during his career.

== International awards ==
Award-giving body/ organization, year, category, and result
Award-giving body/ organization	Year	Category	Result	Ref.
Independent Critics (Note: British film critic TC Candler and The Independent Critics group annually release the Top 100 list of the Most Beautiful and Most Handsome Faces worldwide since 1990. The latter started in 2013. The list showcases global superstars, new young celebrities, and virtual unknowns/ upstarts who represents the modern ideal of worldwide beauty.)	2015	100 Most Handsome Faces	13th	
Independent Critics	2016	100 Most Handsome Faces	33rd	
Independent Critics	2017	100 Most Handsome Faces	61st	
Nickelodeon Kids' Choice Awards	2016	Favorite Pinoy Personality	Nominated	

== Music ==
Award-giving body, year presented, award category, nominee of award, and result of nomination
Award-giving body	Year	Category	Nominee / work	Result	Ref.
Awit Awards	2014	Best Performance by a New Male Recording Artist	OHA (Kaya Mo Ba ‘To?)	Nominated	
Awit Awards	2014	Best Rap Recording	OHA (Kaya Mo Ba ‘To?)	Nominated	
Awit Awards	2014	Best Dance Recording	Magsayawan/ Rock Baby Rock (Medley)	Nominated	
Awit Awards	2017	Best World Music Recording	Mobe	Nominated	
Myx Music Awards	2012	Favorite Guest Appearance In A Music Video	Zia Quizon's Ako Na Lang	Nominated	
Myx Music Awards	2014	Favorite Guest Appearance In A Music Video	Myrtle Sarrosa's Mr. Kupido	Nominated	
PMPC Star Awards for Music	2014	Dance Album of the Year	King of the Gil	Nominated	

== Film and television ==
Award-giving body, year presented, award category, nominee of award, and result of nomination
Award-giving body	Year	Category	Nominee / work	Result	Ref.
ALTA Media Icon Awards	2015	Most Promising Male Star	Enrique Gil	Won	
ALTA Media Icon Awards	2015	Best Love Team	Enrique Gil	Won (Note: Shared with Liza Soberano)	
ALTA Media Icon Awards	2017	Best Love Team	Enrique Gil	Won	
Anak TV Awards	2014	Makabata Star	Enrique Gil	Won	
Anak TV Awards	2015	Makabata Star	Enrique Gil	Won	
Anak TV Awards	2016	Makabata Star	Enrique Gil	Won	
Centro Escolar University Mass Communication Awards for Media and the Arts	2017	Excellence Award in the Field of Entertainment TV	Dolce Amore	Won	
EdukCircle Awards	2016	Drama Actor of the Year	Dolce Amore	Nominated	
EdukCircle Awards	2016	Most Influential Celebrity Endorser of the Year	Enrique Gil	Won	
EdukCircle Awards	2016	Most Influential Love Team of the Year	Enrique Gil	Nominated	
EdukCircle Awards	2017	Most Influential Celebrity Endorser of the Year	Enrique Gil	Won	
EdukCircle Awards	2017	Most Influential Film Actor of the Year	My Ex and Whys and Seven Sundays	Won	
EdukCircle Awards	2017	Best Actor in a TV Series	Dolce Amore	Nominated	
EdukCircle Awards	2018	Best Actor in a TV Series	Bagani	Nominated	
EdukCircle Awards	2018	Love Team of the Year	Bagani	Nominated	
EdukCircle Awards	2019	Most Influential Film Actor of the Year	Alone/Together	Won	
FAMAS Awards	2012	German Moreno Youth Achievement Award	Enrique Gil	Won	
FAMAS Awards	2014	Best Supporting Actor	She's the One	Nominated	
Gawad PASADO Awards	2012	PinakaPASADOng Dangal ng Kabataan	Enrique Gil	Won	
Gawad PASADO Awards	2017	PinakaPASADOng Aktor	Dukot	Won	
GMMSF Box-Office Entertainment Awards	2014	Most Promising Male Star of the Year	She's the One	Won	
GMMSF Box-Office Entertainment Awards	2016	Most Popular Love Team of Movies and TV	Forevermore, Just the Way You Are, Everyday I Love You	Won	
GMMSF Box-Office Entertainment Awards	2017	Most Popular Love Team of the Year	My Ex and Whys	Won	
GMMSF Box-Office Entertainment Awards	2018	Box Office King	My Ex and Whys	Won	
GMMSF Box-Office Entertainment Awards	2020	Prince of Philippine Movies and Television	Alone/Together	Won	
GMMSF Box-Office Entertainment Awards	2020	Most Popular Love Team for Movies	Alone/Together	Won	
Golden Laurel: LPU Batangas Media Awards	2017	Most Popular Love Team	Enrique Gil	Won	
Golden Laurel: LPU Batangas Media Awards	2018	Most Popular Love Team	Enrique Gil	Won	
Illumine Innovation Awards for Television	2016	Most Innovative TV Love Team	Enrique Gil	Won	
Illumine Innovation Awards for Television	2018	Most Innovative TV Love Team	Enrique Gil	Won	
Paragala: The Central Luzon Media Awards	2016	Best TV Actor	Forevermore	Won	
Paragala: The Central Luzon Media Awards	2017	Best TV Actor	Dolce Amore	Nominated	
Paragala: The Central Luzon Media Awards	2020	Top Entertainment Personality	Enrique Gil	Won	
PMPC Star Awards for Movies	2016	Movie Love Team of the Year	Everyday I Love You	Nominated	
PMPC Star Awards for Movies	2018	Movie Supporting Actor of the Year	Seven Sundays	Nominated	
PMPC Star Awards for Movies	2021	Movie Love Team of the Year	Alone/Together	Nominated	
PMPC Star Awards for Television	2015	German Moreno's Power Tandem Award	Enrique Gil	Won	
PMPC Star Awards for Television	2016	Best Drama Actor	Dolce Amore	Nominated	
PMPC Star Awards for Television	2018	Best Drama Actor	Bagani	Nominated	
Sine Sandaan: Celebrating the Luminaries of Philippine Cinema’s 100 Years (Note: Honors are given by the Film Development Council of the Philippines. They are awarded to artists, film workers and actors who made significant contributions to the development of Philippine cinema.)	2019	Love Team ng Sentenaryo	Enrique Gil	Won	
The EDDYS	2018	Best Supporting Actor	Seven Sundays	Nominated	
Yahoo! Philippines OMG! Awards	2012	Most Promising Actor	Enrique Gil	Won	
Yahoo! Philippines OMG! Awards	2013	Breakthrough Actor of the Year	Enrique Gil	Won	

== Popularity and commerciality ==
Award-giving body, year presented, award category, nominee of award, and result of nomination
Award-giving body	Year	Category	Nominee / work	Result	Ref.
ASAP Pop Viewers' Choice Awards	2011	Pop Cutie	Enrique Gil	Nominated	
ASAP Pop Viewers' Choice Awards	2012	Pop Celebrity Cameo	Zia Quizon's Ako Na Lang	Nominated	
ASAP Pop Viewers' Choice Awards	2012	Pop Male Fashionista	Enrique Gil	Nominated	
ASAP Pop Viewers' Choice Awards	2012	Pop Pin-Up Boy	Enrique Gil	Nominated	
ASAP Pop Viewers' Choice Awards	2012	Teen Popsies	Enrique Gil	Nominated (Note: Shared with Kathryn Bernardo)	
ASAP Pop Viewers' Choice Awards	2012	Pop Male Cutie	Enrique Gil	Nominated	
ASAP Pop Viewers' Choice Awards	2012	Pop Fans Club	Quenatics	Nominated	
ASAP Pop Viewers' Choice Awards	2013	Pop Celebrity Cameo	Myrtle Sarrosa's Mr. Kupido	Nominated	
ASAP Pop Viewers' Choice Awards	2013	Pop Male Fashionista	Enrique Gil	Nominated	
ASAP Pop Viewers' Choice Awards	2013	Pop Cover Boy	Enrique Gil	Nominated	
ASAP Pop Viewers' Choice Awards	2014	Pop Male Fashionista	Enrique Gil	Won	
ASAP Pop Viewers' Choice Awards	2014	Pop Pin-up Boy	Enrique Gil	Nominated	
ASAP Pop Teen Choice Awards	2015	Pop Teen Heartthrob	Enrique Gil	Nominated	
ASAP Pop Teen Choice Awards	2015	Pop Teen Love Team	LizQuen	Nominated	
ASAP Pop Teen Choice Awards	2015	Pop Teen Fans Club	LizQuen	Nominated	
ASAP Pop Teen Choice Awards	2016	Pop Love Team	LizQuen	Nominated	
ASAP Pop Teen Choice Awards	2016	Pop Fans Club	LizQuen	Won	
ASAP Pop Teen Choice Awards	2017	Pop Heartthrob	Enrique Gil	Won	
ASAP Pop Teen Choice Awards	2017	Pop Love Team	LizQuen	Won	
ASAP Pop Teen Choice Awards	2017	Pop Fans Club	LizQuen	Won	
Push Awards	2015	PushGram Most Loved Male Celebrity	Enrique Gil	Won	
Push Awards	2015	Awesome Selfie King	Enrique Gil	Won	
Push Awards	2015	Awesome Dance Cover Performance	Enrique Gil	Won (Note: Shared with Maja Salvador)	
Push Awards	2015	PushLike Most Liked Group/Tandem	LizQuen	Nominated	
Push Awards	2015	PushTweet Favorite Group/Tandem	LizQuen	Nominated	
Push Awards	2015	PushGram Most Loved Group/Tandem	LizQuen	Nominated	
Push Awards	2016	PushGram Most Popular Male Celebrity	Enrique Gil	Nominated	
Push Awards	2016	PushLike Most Favorite Group or Tandem	LizQuen	Nominated	
Push Awards	2016	PushTweet Most Favorite Group or Tandem	LizQuen	Nominated	
Push Awards	2016	PushGram Most Popular Group or Tandem	LizQuen	Nominated	
Push Awards	2016	PushGram Best Group or Tandem	LizQuen	Nominated	
Push Awards	2016	Push Ultimate Fan Award	LizQuen	Won	
Push Awards	2019	Push Male TV Performance of the Year	Bagani	Won	
Push Awards	2020	Push Male Movie Performance of the Year	Alone/Together	Won	
Push Awards	2021	Push Popular Love Team	LizQuen	Won	
Push Awards	2021	Fan Club of the Year	LizQuen	Nominated	
Star Cinema Online Awards	2015	Favorite Male Movie Star	Just the Way You Are	Nominated	
Star Cinema Online Awards	2015	Favorite Kilig Moment	Just the Way You Are	Nominated	
Star Cinema Online Awards	2015	Favorite Movie	Just the Way You Are	Nominated	
Star Cinema Online Awards	2015	Favorite TV Show	Forevermore	Nominated	
Star Cinema Online Awards	2016	Favorite Trending Sensation - #ViralRoyalty	LizQuen	Won	
Star Cinema Online Awards	2016	Favorite Fandom - #SquadGoals	LizQuen	Won	
Star Cinema Online Awards	2016	Favorite Love Team - #CoupleGoals	LizQuen	Won	
Star Cinema Online Awards	2016	Favorite Movie - #MovingMovie	Everyday I Love You	Won (Note: Shared with Liza Soberano and Gerald Anderson)	
Star Cinema Online Awards	2017	Ultimate Male Movie Star	My Ex and Whys	Won	
Star Cinema Online Awards	2017	Ultimate Movie of the Year	My Ex and Whys	Won	
Starmometer	2013	100 Sexiest Men in the Philippines	Enrique Gil	1st	
Starmometer	2018	100 Asian Heartthrobs of 2018	Enrique Gil	34th	
Tonight with Boy Abunda: 1st Abundant Awards	2016	Hottest Newsmaker	LizQuen	Won	
Tonight with Boy Abunda: 1st Abundant Awards	2016	Most Kilig Revelation	LizQuen	Won	

== Accolades from media ==
Award-giving body, year presented, award category, nominee of award, and result of nomination
Award-giving body	Year	Category	Nominee / work	Result	Ref.
Candy Readers' Choice Awards	2014	Best Actor	Enrique Gil	Won	
Candy Readers' Choice Awards	2015	Favorite Actor	Enrique Gil	Nominated	
Candy Readers' Choice Awards	2015	Favorite Love Team	LizQuen	Nominated	
LionhearTV	2016	Most Loved Male Artist	Enrique Gil	Nominated	
LionhearTV	2017	Effortless Kilig Love Team	Enrique Gil	Nominated	
LionhearTV	2017	Hottest Male Summer Bod	Enrique Gil	Nominated	
LionhearTV	2021	Biggest-Grossing Filipino Movie Stars since 2010	Enrique Gil	10th-14th	
RAWR Awards	2015	Trending Love Team of the Year	LizQuen	Nominated	
RAWR Awards	2015	Fan Club of the Year	LizQuen	Nominated	
RAWR Awards	2015	Celebrity of the Year (Male)	Enrique Gil	Nominated	
RAWR Awards	2015	Fashionable Celeb of the Year	Enrique Gil	Nominated	
RAWR Awards	2015	Viral Video of the Year	Twerk It Like Miley	Nominated	
RAWR Awards	2016	Favorite Actor of the Year	Enrique Gil	Won	
RAWR Awards	2016	Love Team of the Year	LizQuen	Won	
RAWR Awards	2016	Fan Club of the Year	LizQuen	Won	
RAWR Awards	2017	Love Team of the Year	LizQuen	Nominated	
RAWR Awards	2017	Fan Club of the Year	LizQuen	Nominated	
RAWR Awards	2017	Favorite Movie ng Taon	My Ex and Whys	Nominated	
RAWR Awards	2018	Favorite Bida	Bagani	Nominated	
RAWR Awards	2018	Bet na Bet na Teleserye	Bagani	Nominated	
RAWR Awards	2018	Love Team of the Year	LizQuen	Nominated	
RAWR Awards	2018	Fan Club of the Year	LizQuen	Nominated	
RAWR Awards	2019	Love Team of the Year	LizQuen	Nominated	
RAWR Awards	2020	Love Team of the Year	LizQuen	Nominated	
The PEP List Awards	2017	Celebrity Pair of the Year	LizQuen	Nominated	
VP Choice Awards	2020	Movie Actor of the Year	Alone/Together	Nominated	

== Listicles ==
Name of publisher, year listed, listicle, and placement
Publisher	Year	Listicle	Placement	Ref.
Yes! Magazine	2011	100 Most Beautiful Stars	Included	
Yes! Magazine	2014	100 Most Beautiful Stars (Heartthrobs)	Included	
Yes! Magazine	2015	100 Most Beautiful Stars (Blockbuster Tandems)	Included	
Yes! Magazine	2016	100 Most Beautiful Stars (Hottest Love Teams)	Included	
Yes! Magazine	2017	100 Most Beautiful Stars (Smash Teamups)	Included	
Yes! Magazine	2018	100 Most Beautiful Stars (New Generation A-Listers)	Included	
Metro Society	2018	Most Influential on Social Media (Top Online Sensation)	Included	
