= I Am Not Big Bird =

2024 sex comedy film by Victor Villanueva

- Theatrical release poster
- Directed by: Victor Villanueva
- Written by: Lilit Reyes; Joma Libayen
- Produced by: Charrie M. Avendaño; Annecy Cherie Bautista; Katherine S. Labayen; Patti Lapus; Bradley Liew
- Starring: Enrique Gil; Pepe Herrera; Nikko Natividad; Red Ollero
- Cinematography: Steven Paul Evangelio
- Edited by: Lawrence S. Ang
- Music by: Emerzon Texon
- Production companies: Anima Studios; Black Sheep Productions; Immerse Entertainment
- Distributed by: ABS-CBN Film Productions
- Release date: 14 February 2024
- Running time: 96 minutes
- Country: Philippines
- Languages: Filipino; English; Thai
- Box office: ₱10 million

I Am Not Big Bird is a 2024 Philippine sex comedy film directed by Victor Villanueva from a story and screenplay written by Lilit Reyes and Joma Libayen. It stars Enrique Gil, Pepe Herrera, Nikko Natividad, and Red Ollero. The film follows a man, whose engagement was turned down by his girlfriend, who decides to make a new chapter in Thailand, but when he and his two best friends arrive in the country, he is mistaken for a well-known porn actor.

Jointly produced by Anima Studios, Black Sheep Productions, and Immerse Entertainment and released by ABS-CBN Film Productions, this film marks the first film production venture of Enrique Gil as well as his comeback after a three-year hiatus.

== Synopsis ==
Luis Carpio is a young man whose heart was broken when his girlfriend turned down his engagement. To have a new lease on life and move on, he, along with his best friends, travels to Thailand, but when they arrive, Luis is mistaken by the people of the country as the well-known porn star named "Big Bird".

== Cast ==
- Enrique Gil as:
  - Luis "Carps" Carpio: A bank employee who decides to have a new lease on life in Thailand after his girlfriend turns down his engagement
  - Big Bird: A prominent Thai porn actor who is both beloved and despised by the people of Thailand
- Nikko Natividad as Macky: Luis' quick-tempered friend.
- Red Ollero as July: Luis' friend who is a metrosexual.
- Pepe Herrera as Prajak Tithi: A tour guide in Thailand who is actually a Filipino citizen
- Ashley Rivera as Cathy
- Wipawee Charoenpura as Deborah
- Sahatchai Chumrum as Kimura
- Komron Jivachat as Jaturawit
- Nonthakorn Chalermnai as Kauro
- Ghanda Suriyamanee as Banana Lady 1
- Wikran Meesaeng as Fisherman 1
- Numchai Sunatorn as Fisherman 2
- Direk Jitpat as Fisherman 3
- Donna Cariaga as Bank Manager
- Sunshine Teodoro as Mrs. Martinez 1
- Tiny Rodriguez as Mrs. Martinez 2
- Migs Almendras as Josh
- Gie Onida as Sgt. Dad
- Mikh Vergera as Alexio
- Raf Evangelista as Bernardo
- Philaiwan Laophanich as Slappy Girl
- Kanitsorn Cherdkiatikul
- Kenneth Won as Sanctuary Host
- Jeremy Stutes as Caucasian Foreigner
- Veronica Reyes as Kujira
- Joma Labayen as Salesman
- Caira Lee as Banana Lady 2
- Vern Kaye as Flower Lady
- Christa Jocson as Egg Yolk Lady
- Prince Michael Dagami as Elephant Man
- James Ryan as Mariachi Band
- Ronnie Cruz as Jaturawit's Men 1
- Homer Fernandez as Jaturawit's Men 2
- Dohn David Estolonio as Jaturawit's Men 3
- Christopher Buenviaje as Kimura's Men 1
- Ricardo Wayne as Kimura's Men 2
- Roysan Reyes as Kimura's Men 3
- Wilson Narvino as Deborah's Japanese Assistant
- Charmey Miranda as Japanese Women
- Roven Alejandro as Macky's Adult Partner
- Eunice Santos as Men in BDSM 1
- Zian Amandre as Men in BDSM 2
- Mark Lester Salvador as Snatcher 1
- Giles De Jesus as Snatcher 2
- Angle Fernandez as Snatcher 3
- Shadid Sidri as Snatcher 4
- Den Gerard as Snatcher

== Production ==
=== Development ===
Victor Villanueva, the director of comedy films including Patay na si Hesus and Boy Bastos, accepted Anima Studios' offer to direct the film project, which was revived in early 2023. The project, which will be shot almost entirely in Thailand, was developed before the COVID-19 pandemic, but it was later shelved because of the imposed travel restrictions.

The story and screenplay were written by Lilit Reyes and Joma Libayen, with additional inputs from the director and lead actor-producer. According to Villanueva, the story was based on the experiences of Reyes' friend while he was on a vacation in Thailand, where several women mistook him for someone, causing Reyes and his friend to be confused.

=== Casting ===
Around the second quarter of 2023, while the revived project was in the production stages, Villanueva thought of an actor who could play the project's lead. When they pitched the project to Enrique Gil and his team, they laughed, and according to Villanueva, Enrique Gil loved the pitch, and he agreed to be part of the project. Villanueva and Gil first worked together in the 2019 Antoinette Jadaone film Alone/Together, where the former played an extra while the latter was the film's leading man.

Stand-up comedian Red Ollero joined the project, and it will serve as his first film as an actor. According to Ollero, he didn't expect that he would be chosen by Gil to be part of the film.

=== Filming ===
The cast and production staff flew to Thailand where they spent 14 days filming the sequences, particularly in the cities of Pattaya and Bangkok.

== Release ==
The film was originally set to be released on 25 December 2023, as part of the 49th Metro Manila Film Festival, but it was not accepted as one of the official entries by the committee. After failing to be accepted as a MMFF entry, the film's release date was moved to 14 February 2024.

== Reception ==
=== Box office ===
The film was released alongside Madame Web and earned a total of ₱2.9 million in the Philippines on its opening day, ₱1.1 million on its second day, and 10 million during its whole first-week run.

=== Critical response ===
The film received generally positive reviews according to the review aggregator website Kritikultura, receiving an average score of 69/100 based on 21 reviews.

Goldwin Reviews gave the film 3 stars out of 5 stars and stated that the film is "a big move for an established production company to release an R-16 sexy comedy film nationwide", "a bold decision for famous celebrities to play the roles and say some taboo words", and "opened doors for others to create more gutsy and refreshing concepts for the Filipino audience to see". Despite the film's story concept having flaws due to a lack of its layers, the reviewer concluded that it is undeniable that the film "still got big balls".

Fred Hawson, writing for ABS-CBN News and Current Affairs, gave the film a 7 out of 10 rating and said: The biggest selling point of this new film is its unlikely star -- Enrique Gil -- in his first film post Liza Soberano. Gil pulled up all the stops here, playing dual characters in a genre way out of his romantic lead comfort zone. His Carps was the butt of naughty jokes at the expense of his "shortcomings," while his doppelganger Big Bird was a riot with his legendary shlong. Gil threw all caution to the wind and clearly had fun playing both of them.
