= Everyday I Love You (film) =

- Theatrical movie poster
- Directed by: Mae Cruz-Alviar
- Screenplay by: Gilliann Ebreo; Iris Lacap
- Story by: Roumella Monge-Narciso; John Raphael Gonzaga; Vanessa R. Valdez
- Produced by: Charo Santos-Concio; Malou Santos
- Starring: Enrique Gil; Liza Soberano; Gerald Anderson
- Cinematography: Zach Sycip
- Edited by: Marya Ignacio
- Music by: Jessie Lasaten
- Production company: ABS-CBN Film Productions, Inc.
- Distributed by: Star Cinema
- Release date: October 28, 2015
- Running time: 122 minutes
- Country: Philippines
- Languages: Filipino; English; Hiligaynon
- Box office: ₱178 million

Everyday I Love You is a 2015 Philippine romantic drama film directed by Mae Cruz-Alviar. The screenplay is from writers Vanessa R. Valdez, Kookai Labayen, Iris Lacap, and Gilliann Ebreo. The film stars the year's breakthrough love team, Enrique Gil and Liza Soberano, together with Gerald Anderson. It was released October 28, 2015, and made 16 million pesos on its first day of showing and received generally positive reviews from critics.

== Plot ==
A young woman, whose boyfriend is in a coma, falls in love with an achievement-oriented young man, leaving her torn between the man of her dreams, and the man who makes her dreams come true.

=== Background ===
Ethan (Enrique Gil) is a driven young man from Manila who works for a TV company. While Audrey (Liza Soberano) is a romantic old soul from Silay who is in a relationship with laid-back haciendero, Tristan (Gerald Anderson).

== Cast ==
=== Main cast ===
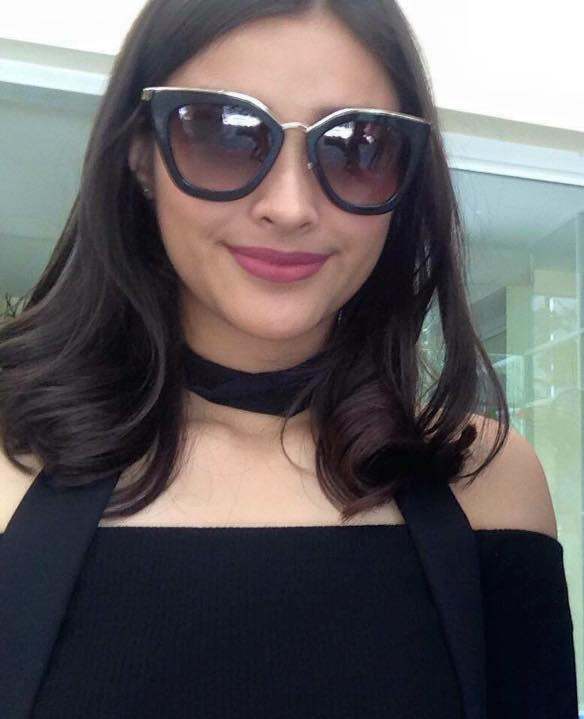
Liza Soberano portrays Audrey Locsin The Feelings of Rich Love of Ethan Joseph Alfaro.

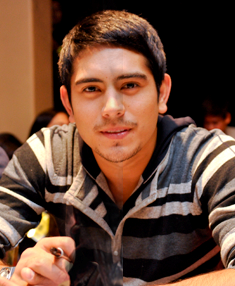
Gerald Anderson portrays Tristan Montelibano Former Girlfriend of Audrey Locsin.

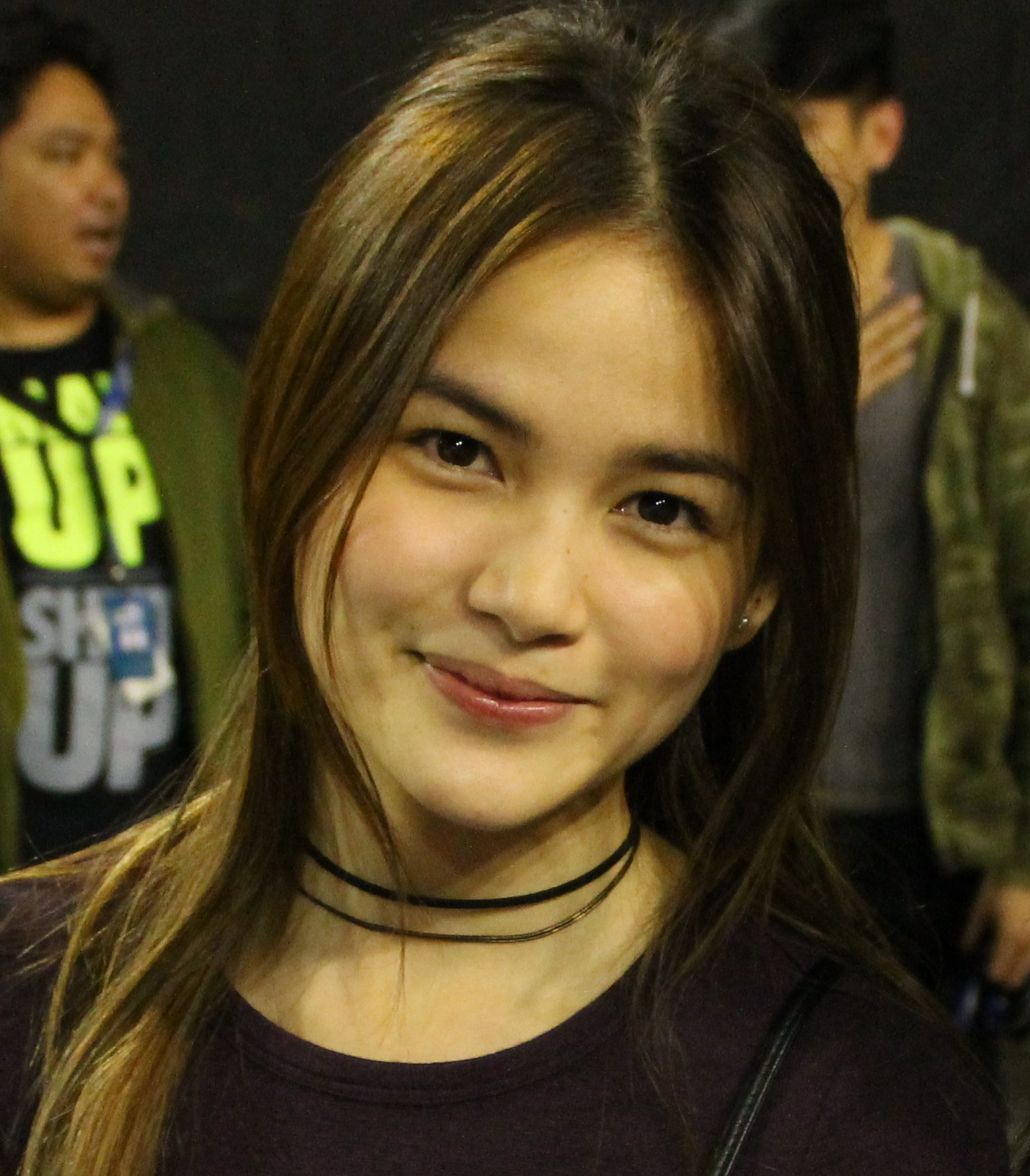
Elisse Joson portrays Andrea Alfaro Ethan's Youngest Sister.

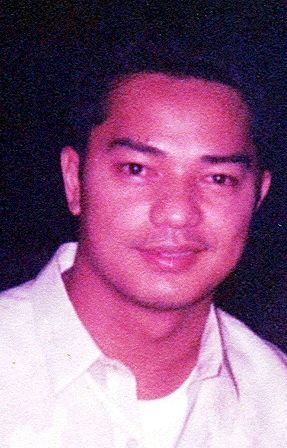
Ariel Rivera portrays Dr. Rex "Anthony" Madrigal

- Enrique Gil as Ethan Joseph Alfaro
- Liza Soberano as Audrey Locsin
- Gerald Anderson as Tristan Montelibano

=== Supporting cast ===
- Aiko Melendez as Guada Locsin, Audrey's Mom
- Carmina Villarroel as Gina
- Marissa Delgado as Lola Maribel
- Liza Lorena as Lola Vivian / Lavi, Ethan's Grandmother
- Candy Pangilinan as Ninang Beth/Ethan's Godmother
- Carla Martinez as Rikki
- Eva Darren as Lola Marivic
- Marita Zobel as Lola Maricar
- Dindo Arroyo as Peter Alfaro/Ethan's Dad
- Edwin Reyes as Mark Montelibano/Tristan's Dad
- Cris Villonco as Helen Locsin/Audrey's Sister
- Niña Dolino as Carmel
- Kristel Moreno as Linda
- Joj Agpangan as Marga
- Alfred Chua as Alfred
- Bryan Santos as Jeff
- Dwight Gaston as Alex
- Yana Asistio as Jamie
- Ariel Rivera as Dr. Rex "Anthony" Madrigal
- Elisse Joson as Andrea Alfaro/Ethan's youngest Sister
- Andrea Brillantes as teenage Audrey
- Paul Salas as teenage Tristan
- Jojo Abellana as Joselito Locsin, Audrey's Dad

== Production ==
=== Development ===
Everyday, I Love You is a romantic drama film directed by blockbuster hit-maker, Mae Czarina Cruz-Alviar. This will mark a reunion with Gerald Anderson, who worked previously with Direk Mae in Catch Me, I'm in Love, and with Enrique Gil and Liza Soberano, whom she worked with in 2013's romantic comedy film She's The One.

In a story conference held July 28, Liza and Enrique talked about their roles in their upcoming Star Cinema movie. Liza plays Audrey, whom she describes as a “romantic with an old soul.” "I live in Silay, Bacolod, and I'm the type of person who's very patient." Meanwhile, Enrique plays Ethan, a guy who grew up with his father when his mother abandoned them to return to her first love. Unlike Liza's character, Enrique's is one who wants everything to be fast- paced. Playing third wheel is Gerald Anderson, who is cast as Tristan, Audrey's boyfriend. Gerald describes his character as a 'probinsyano' and an old soul like his girlfriend. He is also a family man, but “something happens which changes my life completely.”

Direk Mae also said the reason why they chose "The Ruins" as part of the movie is because of its romantic feels. She also added that "...the cast gets a sense of mystery, sense of history, and sense of olden times" in an interview conducted in The Morning Show Bacolod.

However Enrique Gil & Gerald Anderson Reuniting from The Kimerald's Last Film in 2010 Till My Heartaches End, Meanwhile, Direk Mae Decided both Gil & Anderson Movie Tandem Together with Liza Soberano last July 30, 2015, at the Meeting of Star Creatives Office inside at ABS-CBN Broadcasting Center.

=== Filming ===
Filming began on July 30, 2015, at Bonifacio Global City. Although it was interrupted due to "Ghost Month" (which happened between August and September), they resumed filming in early September. Much of the production was on location in Silay, Manapla, specifically Hda. Sta. Rosalia Gaston Bacolod. They also filmed some parts of the movie in Pila, Laguna.

=== Music ===
It Might Be You was originally sung by Stephen Bishop for the 1982 film Tootsie. On October 8, Star Music announced and released the official music video of "It Might Be You", a rendition from Your Face Sounds Familiar contestant and Harana member Michael Pangilinan. This version of Michael's will serve as the official theme song of the film. This also marks his second time to sing the official theme song of hit love team, LizQuen. He sang the official theme song, an OPM classic, "Smile In Your Heart" with the Harana Boys in Just The Way You Are, LizQuen's first film.

=== Full cast and crew ===
- Starring: Enrique Gil, Liza Soberano, & Gerald Anderson, Together With Cai Cortez, Aiko Melendez, Marissa Delgado, Liza Lorena, Bryan Santos, Edwin Reyes, Marita Zobel, Eva Darren, Niña Dolino, Kristel Moreno, Cris Villonco, Dindo Arroyo, Manuel Chua, & Candy Pangilinan, With The Special Participation of: Carmina Villarroel, Elisse Joson, Ariel Rivera & Andrea Brillantes
- Directed by: Mae Cruz-Alviar
- Executive produced by: Charo Santos-Concio & Malou Santos
- Music by: Jesse Lasaten
- Film Edited by: Marya Ignacio
- Production Designed by: Winston Acuyong
- Written by: Vanessa R. Valdez Kookai Labayen Iris Lacap & Gilliann Ebreo
- Sound by: April Castro (dubbing supervisor), Noel Urbano (dubbing supervisor)
- Camera & Electrical Department: Mico Manalaysay (cameramen), Cesca Lee (camera operator), Joel Casaul (car mount/tents - as Joel Casaol), Nonito Cesario (second assistant camera)
- Costume & Wardrobe Department: Adonis Barsuela wardrobe master (as Adonis N. Berzuela)

== Marketing ==
On September 29, during the premiere night of Etiquette for Mistresses, a teaser of Star Cinema's upcoming film for the month of October was released, titled Everyday, I Love You.

On September 30, 2015, before midnight, Star Cinema released the first theatrical teaser of the film in their personal YouTube account.

On October 14, Star Cinema launched the theatrical full trailer of the film during the commercial break of FPJ's Ang Probinsyano.

On October 23, Star Cinema showed the second theatrical trailer of Everyday, I Love You during the commercial break of Pangako Sa 'Yo.

On October 28, the official movie hashtag #NATIONALILOVEYOUDAY trended nationwide on Twitter. LizQuen fans proved unstoppable, which caused the hashtag to later gain even more traction and worldwide attention (it reached the number one spot in several lists, and ultimately garnered more than 3 million tweets). It trended in a record 62 countries, with Hollywood and international celebrities/institutions (USA Today, MTV, Star Wars, SNL, NBC, Harry Styles, Miranda Kerr, Antonio Banderas, Zoe Saldana, and many others) joining in on the "I love you" trend.

== Release ==
The film was released on October 28, 2015, nationwide. The US and Canada premiere was on November 6. 7, 8 was in UK, Austria, Italy, France, and Spain, and on November 12, in Middle East, Australia and New Zealand, on November 14 and 15 UK and, on November 22 was in Singapore.

=== Rating ===
The film received a graded B by the Cinema Evaluation Board. It also was Rated G by the Movie and Television Review and Classification Board (MTRCB).

=== Box office ===
Everyday I Love You earned ₱16 million on its first day of showing. After less than two weeks, it earned ₱100 million. The total worldwide gross is ₱178,739,010 after three weeks.

== Reception ==
=== Critical response ===
Everyday I Love You received positive reviews. Rito Asilo of Philippine Daily Inquirer praised the film saying, "The swoon-worthy romantic tear-jerker effectively brings out what makes Tinseltown’s most photogenic young couple tick and click, and gives hopeless romantics good reason to happily swoon in their seats—but, at the expense of Gerald Anderson, who fritters his third-wheel character Tristan’s romantic chances away, “While You Were Sleeping”-style!" And the lead cast also received praises saying "Enrique and Liza don’t just play to the peanut gallery, they make their potent kilig moments soar. The intimate scenes they share are organically staged by Alviar with a lot of heart, fueled further by Soberano’s disarming dramatic perspicacity and appealing presence." Moreover, he highly praises Liza Soberano, "The gorgeously photographed film’s biggest thespic draw is its leading lady: Soberano’s acting choices may need more texture and refinement—but, at only 17, lovely Liza is quickly coming into her own as a fine actress!". Abby Mendoza of Pep.ph said "Everyday I Love You doesn’t make things difficult for itself. It remains focused and grounded on its premise, reinforcing it with a coherent plot, great performances, and the formidable chemistry between its two leads. While Enrique Gil confirms that he is by now adept at leading man roles, it is Liza Soberano who particularly stands out—which isn’t to harp on her beautiful face on screen. She is a natural who displays the right restraint, pleasing to watch all the more since she doesn’t try too hard. Gerald Anderson, who deviates from his conventional leading man roles in this film, makes for an effective third party.

The Cinema Evaluation Board of the Philippines said "The Film Deserves an incentive for Imparting good values and its wholesome entertainment". On Director, "Director Mae Cruz-Alviar, whose forte seems to be the romantic comedy, appears well at home in this latest project, capable and sincere and devoid of pretension." On Cinematography, there was "nice use of available light in the Negros scenes, where filmmakers must be commended for making the province a veritable character in the movie." And they also praised Liza Soberano raving, "Winning unanimous raves was lead Liza Soberano who displays depth and range and shows much promise. How can someone so young be so adept at her role which she nails down beautifully?"

== Awards and nominations ==
Year	Award	Category	Recipient(s)	Result
2016	47th GMMSF Box-Office Entertainment Awards	Most Popular Love Team of Movies and TV	Liza Soberano and Enrique Gil	Won
2016	32nd PMPC Star Awards For Movies	Movie Love Team of the Year (Special Award)	Liza Soberano and Enrique Gil	Nominated
2016	ALTA Media Icon Awards	Best Actress for Film	Liza Soberano	Won
2016	3rd Star Cinema Online Awards	Favorite Movie - #MovingMovie		Won
