= King of the Gil =

Studio album by Enrique Gil
- Released: July 29, 2013
- Recorded: 2013
- Genre: Dance-pop
- Length: 21:17
- Label: Star Music

Singles from King of the Gil
- 1. "Oha (Kaya Mo Ba To?)" Released: 2013; 2. "Ikaw Lamang" Released: 2013

King of the Gil is the debut album of Enrique Gil under Star Music, released in July 2013.

The album was co-produced by Thyro and hip hop artist Paw Chavez. It contains seven tracks; "Oha (Kaya Mo Ba To?)" [lit. "Can You Do This?"], "Rockin’ Them Jeans" featuring Tippy Dos Santos, "Miss Miss", "Ikaw Lamang" [lit. "Only You"], "So Fly" and two medleys of songs originally by Hagibis and VST & Co.

The track "Ikaw Lamang" was included as one of the theme songs for the 2013 film She's the One.

== Track listing ==
| No. | Title | Writer(s) / Composer(s) | Length |
|---|---|---|---|
| 1. | "Oha (Kaya Mo Ba To?)" | Julius James de Belen, Timothy Alfaro | 2:45 |
| 2. | "Rockin’ Them Jeans" (featuring Tippy Dos Santos) | Julius James de Belen, Timothy Alfaro | 2:37 |
| 3. | "Miss Miss" | Daryl Ronald Rendell Barbaso, Jasper Lukban | 3:34 |
| 4. | "Ikaw Lamang" | Daryl Ronald Rendell Barbaso, Jasper Lukban | 3:43 |
| 5. | "So Fly" | Timothy Alfaro, Jasper Lukban | 3:00 |
| 6. | "Katawan/Legs (Medley)" | Mike Hanopol | 3:44 |
| 7. | "Magsayawan/Rock Baby Rock (Medley)" | Charo Unite, Ernie de la Peña; Vic Sotto | 3:14 |

== Nominations ==
- Nominated for Dance Album of the Year at the 6th PMPC Star Awards for Music
