= Enrique Gil =

Filipino actor and dancer (born 1992)

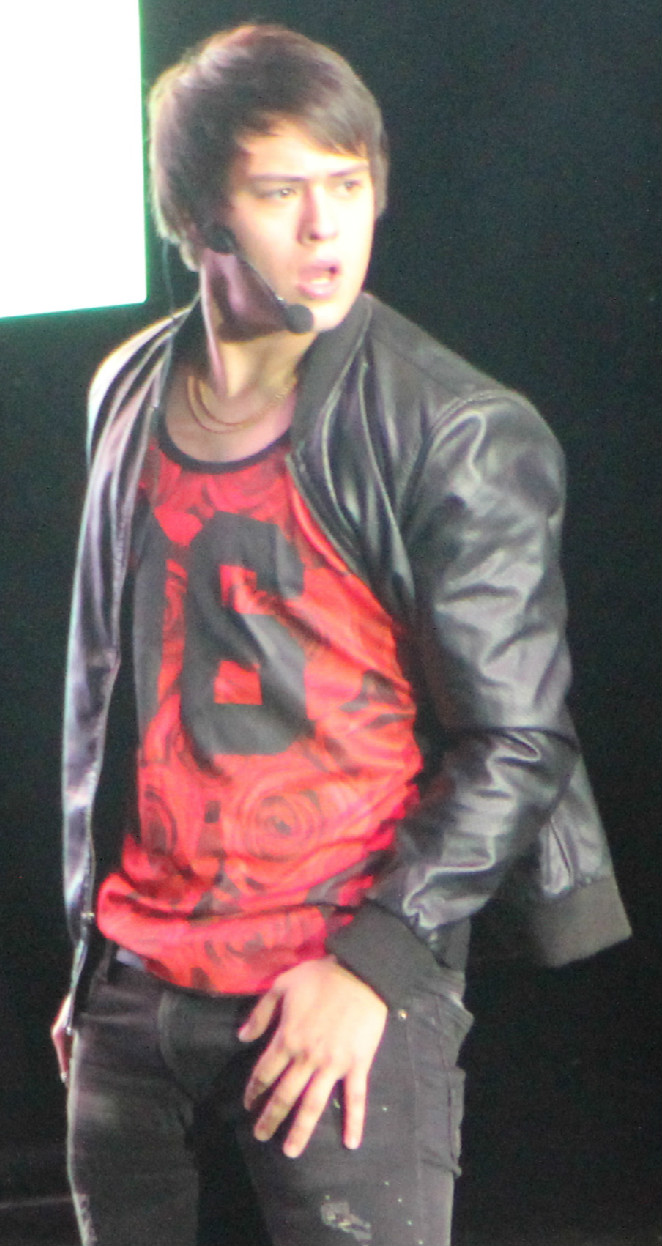
- Gil in June 2014
- Born: Enrique Mari Bacay Gil V March 30, 1992 (age 34); Cebu City, Philippines
- Occupations: Actor; dancer; producer; entrepreneur; model
- Years active: 2008–present
- Agent(s): Star Magic (2008–2025); MQuest Ventures and StarWorx (2025–present)
- Height: 1.78 m (5 ft 10 in)
- Relatives: Dingdong Dantes (cousin)
- Awards: Full list

Enrique Mari Bacay Gil V (Tagalog: [ɛnˈɾikɛ ˈhil]; born March 30, 1992) is a Filipino actor and dancer. Gil has appeared in various films and television shows in the Philippines such as Mula sa Puso (2011), Budoy (2011–12), Princess and I (2012–13), Muling Buksan ang Puso (2013) and She's the One (2013). He gained wider recognition for his role as Xander Grande III in the television series Forevermore in 2014–15, alongside Liza Soberano. Gil has since starred in blockbuster films such as Just the Way You Are (2015), Everyday I Love You (2015), Dukot (2016), My Ex and Whys (2017), Seven Sundays (2017), and Alone/Together (2019); and the television series Dolce Amore (2016), Bagani (2018), and Make It With You (2020). He has received various accolades, including a FAMAS Award and six Box Office Entertainment Awards. In 2024, Gil ventured into co-producing films, which were I Am Not Big Bird and Strange Frequencies: Taiwan Killer Hospital, respectively.

== Early life ==
Enrique Mari Bacay Gil V was born on March 30, 1992, in Cebu City, Philippines. He is the second son of Enrique Amadeo Gil III and Barbara Anne Bacay. He has an older brother named Enrique Javier IV and a younger sister named Diandra Frances. His parents used to work as flight crew for Philippine Airlines. Gil is a cousin of actor Dingdong Dantes.

Gil finished grade school at the Montessori De Manila in Las Piñas in March 2004, and secondary school at Manresa School in Parañaque in March 2008. He went to San Beda College Alabang to pursue a degree in Information Technology, but put his studies on hold to focus on his acting career. In 2016, he started attending a Business Management Program at the Southville International School in Las Piñas.

== Career ==
=== 2008–2011: Career beginnings ===
Gil started acting in 2008. He was 16 years old when his mother made him join My Talent summer workshops headed by Trumpets Playshop founder and STAGES president Audie Gemora, to overcome his shyness. They eventually pushed him to audition for Star Magic. Before being introduced to the media as a member of the Star Magic Circle Batch 16, he appeared in a series of TV commercials, including a Lewis and Pearl's advertisement, alongside Coleen Garcia. He landed his first television role in the action-drama series Pieta where he played the character Harold. Before Pieta, he had a cameo appearance in I Love Betty La Fea as one of the "Eco-models."

In 2009, during the taping of Pieta, his mother convinced him to audition for the sitcom George and Cecil. As soon as head writer and director Jose Javier Reyes saw Gil, he immediately cast him to be on the show. Later he was cast in the indie film Pitas as a brother of the lead character played by Kristel Moreno.

In 2010, he co-starred in the indie war film Diego and His Brothers. He joined ASAP XV as one of Star Magic's "Gigger Boys" in April, and in May, co-starred in the teleserye Rosalka, in which he played Andrew. He was originally set to appear in Kokey @ Ako, but his character was written off in favor of Jason Francisco. In October, he was given the role of Joco, the younger brother of Paolo Barredo (Gerald Anderson), in the film Till My Heartaches End. He got his first hosting stint in the ABS-CBN teen variety show Shoutout!. This was revamped and renamed to Shoutout!: Level Up, but the show was eventually cancelled due to poor ratings.

In 2011, Gil finally nabbed his first lead role as Michael Miranda — originally played by Diether Ocampo — in the 2011 remake of Mula Sa Puso. He next played Jim in the 10th episode of Your Song Presents: Kim. The same year, he played Troy Cabrera in Good Vibes. Gil admitted, during the Good Vibes press conference, that he was set to appear in the ABS-CBN's remake of María la del Barrio but had to turn down the role due to conflicting schedules. He replaced Albie Casiño in the Star Cinema film Way Back Home — the film debut of Kathryn Bernardo and Julia Montes. It was succeeded by his stint as Benjamin “BJ” Maniego in Budoy. He was featured in Zia Quizon's music video debut entitled "Ako Na Lang".

=== 2012–2015: Rising popularity and breakthrough ===
In 2012, he starred as Dasho Jao Rinpoche in Princess and I, which became one of the most popular shows on ABS-CBN. He was also cast in the film The Reunion, a Filipino teen romantic comedy film directed by Frasco Mortiz. He was included in Amorosa, his first horror film. Later in the year, he appeared in The Strangers, one of the official entries for the 38th Metro Manila Film Festival. This was his first MMFF film.

In February 2013, he was featured in Myrtle Sarrosa's "Mr. Kupido" music video. He also portrayed Senate President Juan Ponce Enrile on Maalaala Mo Kaya. Following this, he appeared in a number of new projects such as Muling Buksan ang Puso series, alongside Julia Montes and Enchong Dee.

In October 2013, he starred in the film She's the One with Bea Alonzo and Dingdong Dantes, which earned him a Best Supporting Actor nomination in the FAMAS Awards. Many considered this his breakthrough film as an actor. The film earned 12 million pesos on its first day and grossed 135 million pesos on its fifth week.

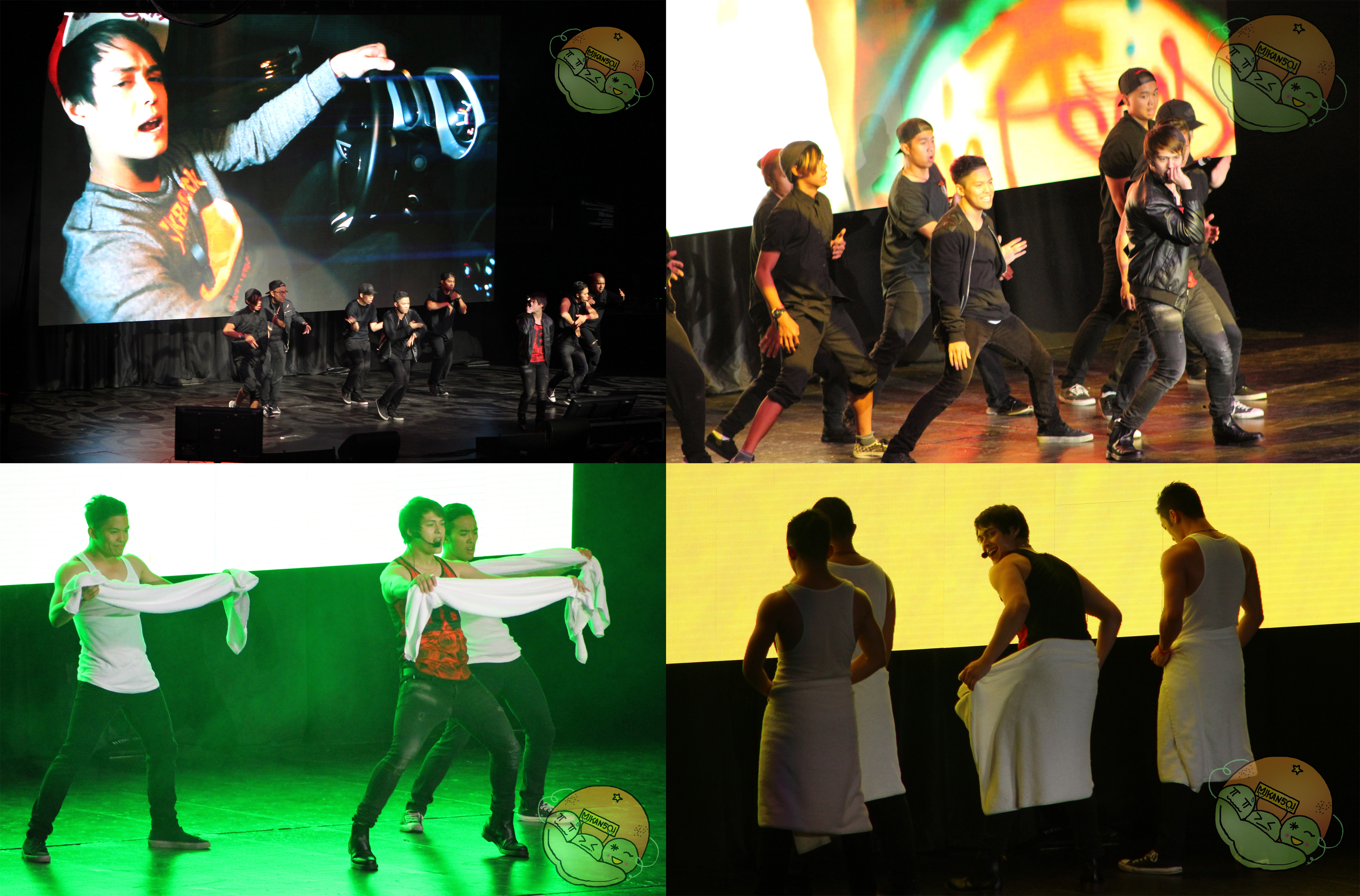
Enrique Gil performing in Toronto, 2014

Gil further gained attention for his dancing skills through his signature moves to the song "Teach Me How to Dougie" and "Gentleman." He released a debut dance album under Star Records entitled King of the Gil which reached Gold status. Later in the year, Gil held his first headlining sold-out dance concert at the Smart Araneta Coliseum with special guests Angel Locsin, Vice Ganda, Kim Chiu, Kathryn Bernardo, Vhong Navarro, Jhong Hilario, Arron Villaflor, Rayver Cruz, Martin del Rosario, Arjo Atayde, Ejay Falcon, gloc-9, Young JV, G-force, The Streetboys, and Julia Montes. Before proving his dancing prowess in the King of the Gil concert, Gil made his debut on radio drama Dear M.O.R. Special on My Only Radio (MOR) 101.9 For Life! and MOR TV. He portrayed Carlo, a hopeless romantic guy who gives everything to his liberated and dominant girlfriend Lois, played by FM radio's first-ever roving DJ and Darling ng Masa Eva Ronda.

In 2014, he replaced Kiko Estrada in the fantasy series Mirabella — the debut project of Julia Barretto. On February 26, the wattpad author HaveYouSeenThisGirL admitted via Twitter that Gil was really supposed to be in the film adaptation of Diary ng Panget but refused to say why it didn't push through. On March 1, Gil launched his single "Do The Moves" with Sarah Geronimo and apl.de.ap. Its youth-oriented music video was released on March 8. On March 16, Gil confirmed that he would be part of the film The Trial as Martin, the best friend of Ronald (John Lloyd Cruz). On May 18, Gil was named the "Most Promising Male Star of the Year" at the 45th Box Office Entertainment Awards. On June 25, Star Cinema announced that Gil alongside Liza Soberano would lead the film adaptation of Kimberly Joy Villanueva's novel The Bet. On August 21, Gil took part in ABS-CBN Philharmonic Orchestra's debut album Decades of OPM together with Abra, doing their version of "Totoy Bibo."

In October 2014, he played the lead role as the rebellious hotel company heir Alexander "Xander" Grande III, who falls in love with Maria Agnes Calay, played by Soberano in the hit romantic comedy television series Forevermore, which marked a significant turning point in Gil's career. The series finale scored a 39.3 percent rating, the highest recorded national TV rating on Philippine television in 2015.

In June 2015, following the success of Forevermore and his tandem with actress Soberano, they starred in a movie based on the Wattpad book The Bet. The film adaptation, initially titled as the same name as its source material was renamed Just The Way You Are. Later that year, Gil starred in his follow-up movie with Soberano in the romantic film Everyday I Love You with Gerald Anderson, directed by Mae Cruz-Alviar. Gil plays Ethan, who falls in love with Bacolod lass Audrey (Soberano), who is in a relationship with Tristan (Anderson). Both 2015 films were box office successes. On December 1, 2015, Gil received a star at the Philippine Walk of Fame at Eastwood City, Libis, Quezon City.

=== 2016–2020: Continued success and hiatus ===
In February 2016, Gil and Soberano returned to prime time with the romantic drama Dolce Amore, in which he played the role of Simon Vicente "TenTen" Ibarra, a poor and hardworking Manila boy who will do anything for his family. In July 2016, Gil was the lead actor in the action film Dukot, which was based on a real kidnapping incident in the country. It was helmed by director Paul Soriano and was co-produced by Star Cinema. He won "Best Actor" in Gawad PASADO Awards for his acting performance.

In 2017, Gil starred in the romantic comedy drama film My Ex and Whys opposite Liza Soberano, directed by Cathy Garcia Molina, who had previously worked with them in the romantic comedy television series Forevermore. The film was released in February 2017, grossing ₱31.5 million on its first day and won him the GMMSF Box-Office Entertainment Award for Box Office King. The same year, he took the role Dex in the family comedy-drama film Seven Sundays alongside Aga Muhlach, Ronaldo Valdez, Cristine Reyes, and Dingdong Dantes. Both films made the Top 10 List of highest-grossing Filipino films in 2017.

In 2018, he was cast in the role of Lakas, a warrior in the television drama and fantasy series Bagani. The show debuted at number 1 in its time slot, and consistently ranked ahead of its competition during its five-month run.

In 2019, Gil and Soberano starred in the romantic drama film, Alone/Together, written and directed by Antoinette Jadaone. In the film, Gil played Rafael "Raf" Toledo, a University of Santo Tomas – Biology student and an avid fan of The Eraserheads turned doctor five years later. The film made the Top 10 List of highest-grossing Filipino films in 2019.

In 2020, Gil appeared with Soberano in Make It With You as Gabriel "Gabo" Villarica, a lost soul who finds himself in the small Eastern European country of Croatia. The show was later cancelled due to the COVID-19 pandemic and the network's franchise renewal issues which marked the end of the loveteam pairing with Soberano. ABS-CBN Films head Kriz Gazmen stated that although they pitched several projects to the duo and were about to "shoot something" (that was later scrapped following COVID case surges in the country at that time), "the timing was never right" and they “wanted to do something different” in their lives.

=== 2023–present: Comeback to entertainment industry and film production venture ===
In 2023, Gil signed an exclusive contract with ABS-CBN.

In 2024, Gil returned to the big screen after a three-year hiatus with I Am Not Big Bird. Co-produced by ANIMA Studios, Black Sheep, and the actor's own production outfit Immerse Entertainment, the film also marked Gil's first venture into film production. In the same year, Gil co-produced and starred in the found footage horror film Strange Frequencies: Taiwan Killer Hospital. The film was part of the 2024 Metro Manila Film Festival.

== Other ventures ==
=== Philanthropy ===
In 2013, Gil joined the PETA campaign "Free Mali" to transfer her from the Manila Zoo to Boon Lott's Elephant Sanctuary in Thailand. Mali is the only captive elephant in the Philippines and has been in captivity for the majority of her life, alone, in a tiny enclosure, and in need of proper care. In the same year, Gil donated part of the proceeds of his King of the Gil concert to the victims of Typhoon Haiyan, also known as Super Typhoon Yolanda.

In 2015, Gil alongside the cast of Forevermore participated in Hoops for Hope: A Charity Basketball Game, a project organized by the Bakhita Canossa Foundation to sustain the construction of houses for the Yolanda victims at Brgy. But, Salcedo, Eastern Samar.

In July 2021, Gil and Soberano held a virtual fan meet to raise funds for Save the Children, a non-profit organization that advocates for children's rights and provides support for children in need.

=== Business ===
Gil released his own fragrance line in collaboration with the Filipino fragrance brand HKT Fragrances. A portion of the brand's sales went to Shop & Share, a non-profit organization which aims to help underprivileged Filipinos get tested for COVID-19. In February 2021, Gil launched HKT Essentials with Soberano, and a portion of the brand's sales went to Save the Children, as well as to a relief program for barangay-level health workers.

In January 2022, Gil shared on his Instagram story that he sold one of his house projects in BF Homes Parañaque through his real estate development business Gil Side Homes. Gil revealed that he has been into buying and selling of houses with his mother Barbara Anne Bacay.

In July 2023, the film I Am Not Big Bird was announced as the first project of Immerse Entertainment, later renamed as Slingshot Studios, a production company that co-produces films and events where Gil holds the position of chief executive officer (CEO). Gil was also named chief marketing officer and new investor of Ticket2Me, a digital ticketing business and video platform for online and offline events.

In March 2025, Gil's Slingshot Studios sealed a multi-film contract deal with MQuest Ventures, the content creation unit of MediaQuest Holdings.

== Personal life ==
Gil dated his Good Vibes co-star Coleen Garcia from 2010 to 2011.

In February 2019, he and his frequent on-screen partner Liza Soberano publicly confirmed they had been a couple since October 24, 2014. Gil and Soberano ended their relationship eight years later, in October 2022; however, it was only Soberano who confirmed the break-up in an unreleased interview in March 2023. In August 2025, Soberano confirmed that their relationship had ended during an episode of the podcast-documentary 'Can I Come In?', by filmmaker Sarah Bahbah.

== Filmography ==
=== Film ===
Year	Title	Role	Notes	Source
2010	Diego and His Brothers	Anton	Short film	
2010	Pitas			
2010	Till My Heartaches End	Jaco Barredo		
2011	Way Back Home	Michael Estacio		
2012	The Reunion	Boggs Alvarez		
2012	Amorosa: The Revenge	Rommel		
2012	The Strangers	Kirk		
2013	Must Be... Love	Dave	Cameo	
2013	She's the One	David Esguerra		
2014	The Trial	Martin Bien		
2015	Just the Way You Are	Drake Sison		
2015	Everyday I Love You	Ethan Alfaro		
2016	Dukot	Carlo Sandoval		
2017	My Ex and Whys	Sergio "Gio" Martinez		
2017	Seven Sundays	Dexter "Dex" Bonifacio		
2019	Alone/Together	Rafael "Raf" Toledo		
2019	The Mall, The Merrier	Robohero	Cameo	
2024	I Am Not Big Bird	Luis Carpio/Big Bird	First produced film	
2024	Strange Frequencies: Taiwan Killer Hospital			
2025	Manila's Finest	1st Lt. Billy Ojeda		

=== Television ===
Year	Title	Role	Notes	Source
2008	I Love Betty La Fea	Himself ― Ecomodel	Cameo	
2008	Pieta	Harold	Guest	
2009	George and Cecil	Carlo Barredo		
2010	Shoutout!	Himself	Host	
2010	P.O.5	Himself	Guest	
2010	Rosalka	Andrew		
2010	Maynila	Mark	Episode: "Dangerous Charade"	
2010	Mara Clara	Mara's Sweet Sixteen escort	Uncredited	
2010–present	ASAP	Himself	Host / Performer	
2011	100 Days to Heaven	Teen Bobby Ramirez	Special participation	
2011	Good Vibes	Troy Cabrera		
2011	Mula sa Puso	Michael Miranda		
2011	Your Song	Jim	Your Song Presents: Kim	
2011	Shoutout!: Level Up	Himself	Performer	
2011–12	Budoy	Benjamin "BJ" Maniego / Dimalanta / Chavez		
2012	Maynila	Tim	Episode: "Star Collision"	
2012–13	Princess and I	Dasho Jan Alfonso "Jao" Rinpoche		
2013	Maalaala Mo Kaya	Juan Ponce Enrile	Episode: "Sapatos"	
2013	Maalaala Mo Kaya	Juan Ponce Enrile	Episode: "Diploma"	
2013	Muling Buksan ang Puso	Francis Dela Vega / Francis B. Andrada		
2014	Mirabella	Jeremy Palmera		
2014–15	Forevermore	Alexander "Xander" Grande III		
2016	Dolce Amore	Simon Vicente "Tenten" Ibarra		
2018	Bagani	Lakas		
2020	Make It with You	Gabriel "Gabo" Villarica		
2026	A Secret in Prague	Michael "Mikoy" Pinagpala		
TBA	Hello, Heaven! †			

=== Music video appearances ===
Year	Title	Performer	Director	Ref.
2011	Ako Na Lang	Zia Quizon	Nani Naguit and Pao Santiago Pangan	
2013	Mr. Kupido	Myrtle Sarrosa	Vince Salumbides III	
2020	Make It With You	Ben&Ben	Miko Pelino	

== Discography ==
Studio albums
Year	Album	Certifications
2013	King of the Gil: Released: July 29, 2013; Label: Star Music	PARI: Gold

Singles
Year	Title	Album
2013	"Oha (Kaya Mo Ba To?)"	King of the Gil
2013	"Ikaw Lamang"_{1}	King of the Gil
2014	"Do The Moves"_{2}	-
2015	"Shine, Pilipinas!"_{3}	-
2015	"Thank You for the Love"_{4}	-
2016	"Mobe"	Choose Amore, Choose Love

Notes

_{1} Theme song for She's The One
_{2} Together with Sarah Geronimo and Apl.de.ap. The single is for an endorsement.
_{3} Together with Liza Soberano. The single is for ABS-CBN's 2015 summer station ID.
_{4} with Liza Soberano, Daniel Padilla, Kathryn Bernardo, James Reid, Nadine Lustre, Bamboo Mañalac, and Elha Nympha

Compilations
Year	Album	Song(s)	Certifications
2012	Love Songs from Princess and I: Released: June 1, 2012; Label: Star Music	"Tunay Na Ligaya"; "Gusto Kita"_{1}	PARI: Gold
2013	Magkasama Tayo sa Kwento ng Pasko: Released: November 20, 2013; Label: Star Music	"Christmas Party (Ang Saya)"	
2014	Decades of OPM: Released: July 18, 2014; Label: Star Music	"Totoy Bibo"_{2}	
2016	Choose Amore, Choose Love: Released: August 13, 2016; Label: Star Music	"Kung 'Di Magkatagpo"_{3}; "Mobe"	

Notes

_{1} Together with Daniel Padilla and Khalil Ramos
_{2} Together with Abra
_{3} Together with Liza Soberano
