= Bagani (TV series) =

2018 Philippine television drama series

- Title card
- Genre: Action drama; Fantasy
- Created by: Henry King Quitain; Olivia Lamasan
- Developed by: ABS-CBN Studios
- Written by: Enrique Villasis; Akeem Del Rosario; Mae Rose Balanay
- Directed by: Richard I. Arellano; Lester Pimentel; Raz de la Torre
- Starring: Enrique Gil; Liza Soberano; Matteo Guidicelli; Makisig Morales; Zaijian Jaranilla
- Composer: Cesar Francis Concio
- Country of origin: Philippines
- Original language: Filipino
- No. of seasons: 2
- No. of episodes: 118

Production
- Executive producers: Carlo Katigbak; Cory Vidanes; Laurenti Dyogi; Malou Santos; Des De Guzman
- Producer: Sackey Prince Pendatun
- Editors: Joshua Ducasen; Mark Angos
- Running time: 45 minutes
- Production company: Star Creatives

Original release
- Network: ABS-CBN
- Release: March 5 – August 17, 2018

Related
- Encantadia

Bagani (transl. warrior) is a 2018 Philippine television drama fantasy series broadcast by ABS-CBN. Directed by Richard I. Arellano, Lester S. Pimentel and Raz de la Torre, it stars Enrique Gil, Liza Soberano, Matteo Guidicelli, Makisig Morales, and Zaijian Jaranilla. It aired on the network's Primetime Bida line up and worldwide on TFC from March 5 to August 17, 2018, replacing La Luna Sangre and was replaced by Ngayon at Kailanman.

== Premise ==
Bagani revolves around the struggle and conflict of five groups: Taga-Patag (farmers), Taga-Kalakal (traders), Taga-Laot (fishermen), Taga-Gubat (hunters) and Taga-Disyerto (warriors) in a fantasy world called Sansinukob.

== Cast and characters ==
=== Main cast ===
Actor	Character	Description
Enrique Gil	Lakas	(Taga-Disyerto); A warrior born into the Desert Region. An outcast and is born with parents who are branded as traitors for standing up for what is right, his father tried to do agriculture despite his land being barren, and his mother is the real successor of the Trade Region's throne. But despite the cruelty of the bullies around Lakas, he grew up in a home filled with love from his dignified father Agos and his thoughtful mother Lila. He is a skilled swordsman and holds the power of Minokawa that can let him fly, make him even stronger and more alert in any kind of war.
Liza Soberano	Ganda	(Taga-Patag); A farmer born into the Farm Region. Ganda is a feisty but loving and responsible younger sister of the leader of the Farm Region. She is willing to sacrifice herself just to secure and stabilize her family and clan. She doesn't give up easily without putting up a fight for what she believes is right. She is a skilled archer and holds the power of Makiling that can give her the ability to get rid of her opponents, whether they are far away or near. Her bow can also change into a sword. She was killed by Sarimaw during their intense confrontation that leaves Sarimaw wounded, but was later revealed that she is stuck in a place called Dako Paroon because Sarimaw brought her there. If Lakas was able to find Dako Paroon, he would be able to free Ganda and Malaya, Sarimaw's mother. Malaya put an evil spirit upon her unknowingly, and was activated when Mayari stabbed Lakas. The spirit was later purged after Lakas and Ganda used both Sinukuan's power and Lakas' love to her.
Matteo Guidicelli	Lakam	(Taga-Kalakal); A man born into the Trade Region. Second son of the ruler of the Trade Region. A dignified man who seems to have everything; money, power, army, perfect face and godly physique. But Lakam still couldn't feel more incomplete for he also has a father who never acknowledged him until his older brother died. Now that it is just him and his father Ama, Lakam does everything he could to gain his father's love and approval. He fights with a hammer axe, and holds the power of Bernardo Carpio that can give him tremendous strength that can break the ground and even mountains. He fell in love on Ganda, but was rejected, and released Sarimaw willingly, but relented and joined the other Baganis to correct his mistakes.
Makisig Morales	Dumakulem	(Taga-Gubat); A youth born into the Forest Region. Contrary to his people, Dumakulem longs to explore the world outside the forest. Although he longs to see the outside world, Dumakulem considers his family and people, the most important things to him and will protect them at any cost. He is naturally charming and fun-loving, the kind that loves to joke around and was naive about anything. But at the same time, he is also perceptive and smart. He is able to showcase his resourcefulness in so many ways. He fights with the arnis, and holds the power of Liwliwa that can grow any life on earth. His arnis can also change into a spear.
Zaijian Jaranilla	Liksi	A slave from the Trade Region, who wishes to be a Bagani someday. He idolizes the Bagani, especially Lakas from the Desert Region. He made a brief appearance in the first episode, narrating the events using modern Filipino slang. He is the new Bagani who holds the power of Kataw, replacing Mayari after her death and protecting the Sea Region thereafter. It was later revealed that his family were once slaves from the Sea Region before they lived in the Trade Region.

=== Supporting cast ===
Actor	Character	Description
Aiko Melendez	Matadora/Bighani	The most feared pirate in the Island of Matutulis and the older half-sister of Marikit. It was revealed that she is formerly from the Farm Region when she and her mother were kicked out by Ganda's mother. Later on, she received the power of the dagger of Berberoka from Sarimaw, the same weapon that killed Apo. It was later revealed that she is the older half-sister of Dilag and Ganda. After she committed suicide, she was rescued and purged of Berberoka's powers by Magindara and reunited with her sister.
Kristine Hermosa	Malaya	A goddess who is the ruthless wife of Bathala and the manipulative mother of Sarimaw. She has been imprisoned by Bathala for protecting and tolerating the evil deeds of Sarimaw. She escaped with Gaki and plotted Sansinukob's downfall, but failed. She was killed when the evil spirit purged from Ganda possesses her son, Sarimaw.
Ryan Eigenmann	Sarimaw	The younger half-brother of Apo, the son of Bathala and Malaya, and a guardian deity who looks after the Sansinukob. He wants to remove the freedom of the mortals and rule over them. After he was defeated by Baganis, he was reduced to a wounded husk. His body was possessed by the evil spirit that Ganda has and accidentally killed his own mother, Malaya.
Rayver Cruz	Kidlat	A brave warrior from the Desert Region and friend of Lakas and temporarily took charge of leading the tribe in Lakas' absence. Although not yet shown in the series, Lila describes Kidlat's father, Kulog as a mischievous and goofy man who also originated from the Trade Region just like the founding members of the Desert Region. He was lured into also using Berberoka, but due to his pure heart, he was instead possessed by evil spirits. But he endured it, and purged by Maguindara's powers. Fell in love with Alon.
Dimples Romana	Gloria	The powerful yet sarcastic Babaylan of Sansinukob.
Christian Vasquez	Dakim	He is the son of Alab and the former leader of the Desert Region. He was killed by Ganda while trying to kill Lakas but was able to survive with the help of a Werewolf pack and became a werewolf. Dakim and the werewolves team up with the Baganis against Sarimaw to save Sansinukob. He became the Desert Region's ambassador and Lakam's right-hand man.
Robert Seña	Ama	The father of Lakam and the leader of the Trade Region. An ambitious man, he conspired with Dakim to usurp the throne Lila's father has. He used himself as pawn of Sarimaw and Malaya. He was incarcerated by his own son for betrayal.
Ana Abad Santos	Lila	A royal heiress to the throne of the Trade Region and the mother of Lakas. She later forsook the throne after she fell in love with Lakas' father Agos. She became the mother of all Desert Region's people after Lakas became their leader.
Joonee Gamboa	Koloko	The grandfather of Liksi, older brother of Lolita, father of Dandan and Malong, and a slave from the Trade Region. He was formerly a slave from the Sea Region.
Rio Locsin	Dandan	A staff who works in the kitchen of the palace of Trade Region, the aunt and a mother figure to Liksi and the older sister of Malong. She was formerly a slave from the Sea Region.
Precious Lara Quigaman	Dilag	The older sister of Ganda, and one of the richer leading figures of the Farm Region. It was later revealed that she is the half-sister of Matadora/Bighani. She was killed by Malaya in front of Lakas, Lakam, Dumakulem and Liksi for avenging Sarimaw's downfall.
Justin Cuyugan	Gaki	The deity of Dako Paroon. Later, he joined Malaya in Sansinukob after his defeat. He was defeated and killed by Lakas.
Nanette Inventor	Lolita	A staff who works in the kitchen of the palace of Trade Region, the grandmother of Liksi, and younger sister of Koloko. She was formerly a slave from the Sea Region.
Maricar Reyes	Makiling	A mythical diwata or goddess who serves as the power of Ganda that can give her the ability to get rid of her opponents, whether they are far away or near.
Benjie Paras	Bernardo Carpio	A mythical creature who serves as the power of Lakam that can strengthen his strength which can break mountains and divide the ground.
Ahron Villena	Kataw	A mythical merfolk with reptilian appearance who serves as the power of Mayari and later, Liksi that can protect anything that is important in her and his life. It can also allow her and him to teleport. After Mayari's death, Kataw chooses Liksi to be the new Bagani to hold its power.
Cora Waddell	Liwliwa	A mythical lambana or pixie who serves as the power of Dumakulem that can grow any life on earth.
Ricky Rivero	Buringga	A werewolf who helps Dakim to live again.
Richard Quan	Undoy	Datu's right-hand man and a councilman from the Sea Region. He betrays Datu and joins with Sarimaw. He became brainwashed minion of Malaya.
Minco Fabregas	Hukluban/Sibulo	Ama's second-in-command who secretly conspires against the peace alliance brought by the new Baganis. Later to be Sarimaw's minion and has the ability to shapeshift. He was later armed by Malaya with the Dagger of Berberoka and gave him the power to poison enemies, but was sealed in a jar alongside his friends.
Mikylla Ramirez	Ula	A friend of Dumakulem. (Ula is a reimagined version of the titular character played by Judy Ann Santos in the 1988 TV Series, Ula, Ang Batang Gubat.)
Joj Agpangan	Lala	One of Dumakulem's friends from the Forest Region.
Dwight Gaston	Islaw	The father of Dumakulem, and their people's leader.
Sunshine Garcia	Mansisilat	A minion of Sarimaw that can make fire. She enslaved the Forest Region until she was evicted. She was captured by Baganis when the group went sweeping Sansinukob of Sarimaw's minions and sealed in the jar.
Lemuel Silvestre	Limon	A messenger from the Farm Region, a fun-loving farmer. Turned blind by Tawong Lipod after a failed rebellion, he became a seer and a poet.
Eric Tai	the Giant and Higa	On his first role, he is a minion of Sarimaw that was defeated by the 5 Baganis. On his second role, he is a pirate from the Island of Matutulis. Died after Malaya went berserk.
Jun Nayra	Malong	The father of Liksi, younger brother of Dandan, and a slave from the Trade Region. He was formerly a slave from the Sea Region.
Joseph Andre Garcia	Tukmol	A friend of Liksi and a slave from the Trade Region.
Joseph Ison	Bungisngis	A minion of Sarimaw that can release insects from his mouth and teleport by a form of insects. Enslaved the Desert Region until Dakim and the Werewolves defeat him. After Sarimaw's defeat, he was shown with Hukluban. He was sealed by Baganis in a jar to end their rampage.
Manuel Chua	Tawong Lipod	A minion of Sarimaw. He enslaved the farmers until Gloria evicted him. He was captured and sealed by the Baganis.
Thou Reyes	Tong-Tong	A pirate from the Island of Matutulis. A neutral man, he observes the events clearly, but loyal to his captain. He and his friends lived in Farm Region.
Jeffrey Tam	Mango	A pirate from the Island of Matutulis. He and his friends lived in Farm Region.
Igi Boy Flores	Ali	A pirate from the Island of Matutulis. He and his friends lived in Farm Region.
Wacky Kiray	Dagat	A pirate from the Island of Matutulis. A natural goofball. He and his friends lived in Farm Region.
Eslove Briones	Paquito	A pirate from the Island of Matutulis. He and his friends lived in Farm Region.
Mark Andaya	Lake	A pirate and the younger brother of Sarap from the Island of Matutulis. He and his friends lived in Farm Region.
Miko Mel Peñaloza	Sarap	A pirate and the older brother of Lake from the Island of Matutulis. He and his friends lived in Farm Region.
Lou Veloso	Hito	An old pirate who has been observing (guiding) Matadora and Marikit, since their exile to the Island of Matutulis. Later, he joined Undoy and others to resist the Baganis and brainwashed by Malaya.
Alyanna Angeles	Diwa	A teenager from the Sea Region.
Maria Isabel Lopez	Doray	The mother of Dumakulem.
Shy Carlos	Alon	A saleswoman from the Trade Region. Became Kidlat's fiancée.

=== Recurring cast ===
Actor	Character	Description
Nonong “Bangkay” de Andres	Laman	One of Agos's Family's loyal followers from the Desert Region.
Ryan Rems	Damo	One of Lila's followers who practices farming in the Desert Region. The best friend of Laman.
John Steven de Guzman	Liboy	A kid and a student of Lila from the Desert Region.
Nhikzy Calma	Kulitlit	A kid and a student of Lila from the Desert Region.
Jana Agoncillo	Kulot	A kid and a student of Lila from the Desert Region.
Pontri Bernardo	Damplig	A Fisher royal Guard.
Simon Ibarra	Mariwales	Mayari's father
Aiko Climaco	Bebe	A slave from the Sea Region.
Marco Masa	Tintoy	A kid from the Trade Region who lost his father during the attack on Farm Region.
Heidi Arima	Liwed	A Farmer
Young JV	Litwas	A Farm warrior
Emmanuelle Vera	Aruaka	They are also known as a "Magindara". The mermaids in the series are said to have the ability to read the real desire of someone's heart and are older than the people of Sansinukob.
Derick Hubalde	Balde	A Trade general warrior
Miko Palanca	Biber	The spy of Lakam.
Diego Romero	Likos	A pirate
Jojo Riguerra	Gurod	A pirate
Fourth Solomon	Toto	An inhabitant from Dako Paroon that was revealed to be the Kambal Kurimaw together with his twin. No one knows his real face because he is using the face of his recent victim. They tried to steal the beauty of Ganda but was stopped by Malaya.
Fifth Solomon	Tata	An inhabitant from Dako Paroon that was revealed to be the Kambal Kurimaw together with his twin. No one knows his real face because he is using the face of his recent victim. They tried to steal the beauty of Ganda but was stopped by Malaya.
Carlo Ilac	Pangilon	A werewolf
Martin Cleos	Kindat	A warrior from the Desert Region.
Kim Molina	Ngatngat	An inhabitant from Dako Paroon and the righthand of Malaya.
Ali Khatibi	Liniwon	a Dako Paroon inhabitant
Uajo Manarang	Kiwanay	a Dako Paroon inhabitant
Via Antonio	Lohudis	a Dako Paroon inhabitant
Bea Rose Santiago	Meyves	a Dako Paroon inhabitant
Zandra Summer	Arinda	a Magindara
Ayla Mendero	Orlosa	a Magindara
Raven Relavo	Libasya	a Magindara
Jasha Orsos	Gorolya	a Magindara
Karra Pineda	Liwasid	a Magindara
MJ Lastimosa	Gandara	The queen of the mermaids.
Joe Vargas	Ngotngot	a Dako Paroon inhabitant and Ngatngat's wife
Lance Pimentel	Mahiko	He was assigned to guard Malaya's crown but became a minion of Malaya after Malaya retrieved her crown and hypnotized him.
Francesca Ysabel "Chelsea" Bernasconi	Mahika	She was assigned to guard Malaya's crown but became a minion of Malaya after Malaya retrieved her crown and hypnotized her.

=== Special participation ===
Actor	Character	Description
Sofia Andres	Mayari	(Taga-Laot); A slave born into the Sea Region. Born from a family of slaves. She developed feelings for Datu and has served him well. Even as a slave, Mayari held on to her hopes and dreams to rise above her social class and be able to be with the one she loves. Her intuition and courage in defending her family, loved ones, ruler and race made her raise herself into being a Bagani. She is willing to go through lengths to protect the ones she love and to keep peace in the midst of war. She fights with a dagger. She holds the power of Kataw that bestows her a powerful shield that is strong enough to absorb lightning, and can protect anything that is important in her life. It can also allow her to teleport. She was killed defending her land by lightning brought by Sarimaw. Later in the series, she had returned to life but as an enemy of the Baganis because Malaya used her dead body in order to kill Lakas, an empty body with the soul of Malaya's minion. She was later killed finally by Lakas in attempting to kill him in front of Ganda during their wedding.
Albert Martinez	Agos	The father of Lakas and the husband of Lila. He was killed by Dakim after he uncovered the conspiracy. And he was vilified for being a traitor.
Lito Pimentel	Alab	A friend of Agos and the father of Dakim. He was killed by his own son to keep the secret of the true leadership of the Desert Region remain unknown by the tribe and his knowledge of the conspiracy.
Diether Ocampo	Apo	The older half-brother of Sarimaw, the son of Bathala, and a guardian deity who looks after the Sansinukob. He believes that there is still courage and love in the hearts of the mortals. He was killed by Sarimaw using Berberoka, but divided his power among his creations before his death.
Zyren Luansing	young Lakas	The bullied kid.
Yesha Camile	young Ganda	
	young Kidlat	One of Lakas first friends.
Bart Guingona	the father of Dilag and Ganda	
Isay Alvarez-Seña	the mother of Dilag and Ganda	
Raikko Mateo	young Lakam	
Marc Santiago	teenage Lakam	
Khalil Ramos	Lakam's Brother	He was the successor of Ama, but died after a fight with Desert Peoples. Lakam's inspiration of being ambitious.
Raymond Bagatsing	Bathala	The husband of Malaya and the father of Apo and Sarimaw. He imprisoned Malaya for protecting Sarimaw.
Lance Lucido	young Apo	Shown as Sarimaw's comatose dreams.
JB Agustin	young Sarimaw	Shown as flashbacks during Sarimaw's comatose dreams.
Andrea Brillantes	young Matadora/Bighani	She was exiled due to her unknown sin.
Garie Concepcion	Pranka	The leader of the rich pirates in the Island of Matutulis. She was killed by Matadora during a fight because she did not agree to join the war, and the latter made pun of her name.
Niña Dolino	Malang	The mother of Liksi and a slave from the Sea Region.
	young Marikit	
Anne Feo	Ina	The mother of Lakam and the wife of Ama. She died from giving birth to Lakam.
Zarah Pagay	Gandara and Larga	On her first role, she is the queen of the Magindaras in her octopus form. On her second role, she is an inhabitant from Dako Paroon and the wife of Galak.
Allyson McBride		The imaginary daughter of Lakas and Ganda.
Sophia Reola		The imaginary daughter of Lakas and Ganda.
Angelika Rama		The imaginary daughter of Lakas and Ganda.
Jaymee Caycoya		The imaginary son of Lakas and Ganda.
Cloud Siegfrid Ramos		The imaginary son of Lakas and Ganda.
Jojit Lorenzo	Galak	An inhabitant from Dako Paroon and the husband of Larga. Later revealed that their existence was a distraction to Lakas and Ganda.
Hannah Lopez Vito	young Dilag	
Anna Luna	young mother of Dilag and Ganda	
Mimi Orara	Rosa	The mother of Mayari. She was killed by Mayari after confronting her about her identity.
Enzo Pineda	Datu	The leader of the Sea Region. Datu captured Mayari's attention. He was killed by Mayari after he confronted her that she killed her own mother and her plan to kill Lakas.
Charlie Dizon	Marikit and Halina	On her main role, she is a captain pirate and the younger half-sister of Matadora in the Island of Matutulis. It was revealed that she is the daughter of one of the former rich people from the Farm Region. She was killed by Malaya and use her dead body to kidnap Lila. On her special role as Halina in flashbacks, she is the mother of Matadora and Marikit. She became one of the richer leading figures of the Farm Region until she and Matadora were rejected by them.
Belle Mariano	young Gloria	Since she was not serious about studying to be a Babaylan, she was exiled from the Land of the Babaylans by her parents.
Giovanni Baldisseri	Gloria's Father	
	Gloria's Mother	
Jay Gonzaga	Babaylan Mamerto	A contemporary of Babaylan Gloria.
Rianne Love Soberano	Galak	The 7th child and youngest daughter of Lakas and Ganda.

== Production ==
=== Casting ===
Bailey May and Ylona Garcia were initially part of the main cast. The two withdrew from the cast due to their conflicting schedules. The respective roles of May and Garcia were given to Sofia Andres and Makisig Morales in final casting. Deither Ocampo returns to ABS-CBN with Bagani after leaving the network in 2014. He worked for The 5 Network and GMA Network during his break from ABS-CBN. Gil and Soberano returned to the said drama series after Forevermore in 2014 and Dolce Amore in 2016.

After 7 years, Kristine returns to ABS-CBN since Noah for her last appearance. She and Diether Ocampo work together in Sana'y Wala Nang Wakas, 'Til Death Do Us Part and Palimos ng Pag-ibig (Sineserye Presents' first installment). Kristine and Rio Locsin also both play the role of Luisa Santos-Medel and Idad Santos in Gulong ng Palad.

=== Setting ===
Enrique Gil, one of Bagani's stars, has stated that the series tells a story on how the Philippines was "born" and will be about Filipino culture. Though headwriter Mark Angos, following a casting controversy, later clarified that Bagani is set in a fictional world called Sansinukob which was conceptualized using elements from Philippine mythology.

=== Filming ===
The desert scenes were filmed in Paoay Sand Dunes in Paoay, Ilocos Norte. The village sets were designed by Leeroy New and were built in Ilocos. New also made some sets in Bulacan.

=== Release ===
In May 2017, Liza Soberano announced the title of the television series to the public. The select members of the Bagani cast wearing their respective character's costumes participated in a trade launch event of ABS-CBN on November 28, 2017. This led to comparisons with Encantadia, a fantasy series by rival network GMA.

A teaser poster of Bagani was released in January 2018, while a full trailer of the series was released online on February 8. The trailer features Lakas, a character played by Enrique Gil as well as the setting and battle scenes of the series.

The series started its run on March 5, 2018, replacing La Luna Sangre.

== Reruns ==
The series began airing reruns on Kapamilya Channel's Kapamilya Gold afternoon block and A2Z's Zuper Hapon from August 29 to November 25, 2022 (replacing the reruns of Init sa Magdamag and was replaced by the reruns of Ang sa Iyo ay Akin).

The series also began airing reruns on Jeepney TV from January 11 to April 1, 2021 (replacing the reruns of A Love to Last and was replaced by the reruns of Sana Dalawa ang Puso); February 19 to May 10, 2024 (replacing the reruns of Walang Hanggang Paalam and was replaced by the reruns of Precious Hearts Romances Presents: Pintada); and December 21, 2025 to May 3, 2026 (replacing the reruns of The Better Half and was replaced by the reruns of Tubig at Langis).

== Reception ==
=== Television ratings ===
Kantar Media National TV Ratings (9:00PM PST)
Pilot Episode	Finale Episode	Peak	Average
35.5% March 5, 2018	32.3% August 17, 2018	36.2% April 12, 2018 and April 17, 2018	TBD

=== Controversies ===
==== Casting decision ====
In February 2018, prior to its airing, Bagani was criticized online for casting actors of Caucasian descent in a show supposedly inspired by pre-colonial Philippine mythology. The main cast includes: Enrique Gil, who is of Spanish and German descent; Liza Soberano, whose mother is American; and Matteo Guidicelli who is half Italian. Netizens criticized the entertainment industry for setting fair skin as the standard of beauty. They also criticized the use of makeup to make the actors look like they have brown skin.

Liza Soberano responded to the critics through a tweet where she defended her Filipino identity: "My father is full Filipino. I was raised by two Filipinos since the age of 4." The show's headwriter, Mark Angos, explained through Twitter that Bagani is set in Sansinukob, a fictional alternate world with elements from Filipino mythology. He clarified that Bagani is not "precolonial" or "historical". He also explained that the actors who portray the "desert people" had to wear brown makeup because the script states that dirt and sand sticks to their skin. He also added that "colorism is real" but using it as "a bullet to demonize Filipinos of mixed heritage" is "disgusting". Other netizens also defended the show.

==== Portrayal of the "Bagani" ====
The series has also been criticized by historical societies and indigenous groups for what they view as a "misuse" of the term "Bagani" and misrepresentation of Philippine tribes. Ronald Adamat of the Commission on Higher Education took umbrage and sought clarification from ABS-CBN over its depiction of indigenous people, stating he was "deeply bothered about the portrayal of ‘Bagani’ in a teleserye as being a ‘bayani with magical powers.’"

On March 5, 2018, the National Commission on Indigenous Peoples (NCIP) released a statement on the use of "Bagani" in the series stating that the "Bagani" are real, not fictional, or a "mythological group of warriors" that the Bagani television series "would like to portray" noting that the term originally refers to the peacekeeping force of the Manobo and other indigenous groups of Mindanao. It insisted that the use of the concept of Bagani in the television series "distorts, misleads and confuses" the meaning of the indigenous term. ABS-CBN released a statement that it does not intend to malign any indigenous group and that Bagani seeks "to feature warriors, protectors, and heroes who espouse Filipino values and beliefs" and pointed out that the series was never purport itself as a historical account of Philippine history or culture.

A disclaimer was since incorporated in the program, stating:

Ang kuwentong inyong mapapanood ay kathang-isip lamang at kumuha ng inspirasyon mula sa iba’t ibang alamat at mitolohiyang Pilipino. Ito’y hindi tumutukoy o kumakatawan sa kahit anong Indigenous People sa Pilipinas. ("The story you're about to watch is a work of fiction and is inspired by Philippine mythology and folk legends. It does not refer to or does not represent any Indigenous People in the Philippines.")

The aforementioned disclaimer was later revised in subsequent episodes starting March 14, stating:

Ang mga Bagani ay totoong mandirigma na mula sa kultura ng Indigenous Peoples. Ang kuwentong inyong mapapanood ay kathang-isip lamang at hindi tumutukoy o kumakatawan sa kahit anong Indigenous People sa Pilipinas, bagamat kumuha ng inspirasyon sa mga kulturang ito. ("The Bagani are real warriors from the culture of Indigenous Peoples. The story you're about to watch is a work of fiction and does not refer to or does not represent any Indigenous People in the Philippines, although it is inspired by these cultures.")

ABS-CBN released a press release statement on March 13, 2018, that it has made a consensus with representatives from the Commission on Higher Education, House of Representatives, and the National Commission on Indigenous Peoples that the indigenous term of "Bagani" was used by network in good faith that it shall remain the title of the series. It also express its willingness to become a "partner" to these groups to promote awareness on indigenous Filipino culture. The writers and directors of Bagani later added in a press conference on March 15 that they found the need to "explore" the concept of the "Bagani" from the indigenous people's point of view and remarked how the television series encouraged "intelligent discussions about culture, identity, etc." in comparison to other teleseryes.

GMA-7 headwriter Suzette Doctolero also criticized the show particularly on the portrayal of Babaylans.

== Awards and nominations ==
Year	Award	Category	Recipient(s)	Result
2018	8th EdukCircle Awards	Best Actor in a TV Series	Enrique Gil	Nominated
2018	8th EdukCircle Awards	Love Team of the Year	Liza Soberano and Enrique Gil	Nominated
2018	32nd PMPC Star Awards for Television	Best Primetime TV Series	Bagani	Nominated
2018	32nd PMPC Star Awards for Television	Best Drama Actor	Enrique Gil	Nominated
2018	32nd PMPC Star Awards for Television	Best Drama Actress	Liza Soberano	Nominated
2018	32nd PMPC Star Awards for Television	Best Drama Supporting Actor	Matteo Guidicelli	Nominated
2018	32nd PMPC Star Awards for Television	Best New Female TV Personality	Charlie Dizon	Nominated
2018	RAWR Awards 2018	Bet na Bet na Teleserye	Bagani	Nominated
2018	RAWR Awards 2018	Favorite Bida	Enrique Gil	Nominated
2018	RAWR Awards 2018	Favorite Kontrabida	Ryan Eigenmann	Nominated
2018	RAWR Awards 2018	Beshie ng Taon	Zaijian Jaranilla	Nominated
2019	Push Awards	Push Male TV Performance of the Year	Enrique Gil	Won

== See also ==
- Bagani
- List of programs broadcast by ABS-CBN
- List of ABS-CBN Studios original drama series
