= Just the Way You Are (2015 film) =

Just The Way You Are
- Theatrical movie poster
- Directed by: Theodore Boborol
- Written by: Maan Dimaculangan-Fampulme; Ceres Helga Barrios
- Based on: The Bet by Kimberly Joy Villanueva (ilurvbooks)
- Produced by: Charo Santos-Concio; Malou Santos
- Starring: Enrique Gil; Liza Soberano
- Cinematography: Gary Gardoce
- Edited by: Beng Bandong
- Music by: Jessie Lasaten
- Production company: Star Cinema
- Distributed by: ABS-CBN Film Productions
- Release date: June 17, 2015
- Running time: 107 minutes
- Country: Philippines
- Languages: Filipino; English
- Box office: ₱100 million ($2,211,899)

Just The Way You Are (originally titled The Bet) is a 2015 Filipino teen romantic comedy-drama film directed by Theodore Boborol, and written by Maan Dimaculangan-Fampulme and Ceres Helga Barrios, starring the hit ‘Forevermore’ tandem of Enrique Gil and Liza Soberano. The film is based on the best-selling Pop Fiction book ‘‘The Bet’’ which was originally published on Wattpad by Kimberly Joy Villanueva (ilurvbooks).

== Synopsis ==
The story follows a popular guy named Drake Sison (Enrique Gil), who makes a bet with his best friend Andrei (Yves Flores), to make the nerdy transfer student, Sophia Taylor (Liza Soberano), fall in love with him in thirty days. Once she falls for him, he must confess that it was all a bet. However, this proves to be otherwise because Sophia doesn't fall for Drake's schemes, making it difficult for the school heartthrob. Will they ever work out their differences and fall in love or will it prove to be a disaster for both?

== Cast ==
=== Main cast ===
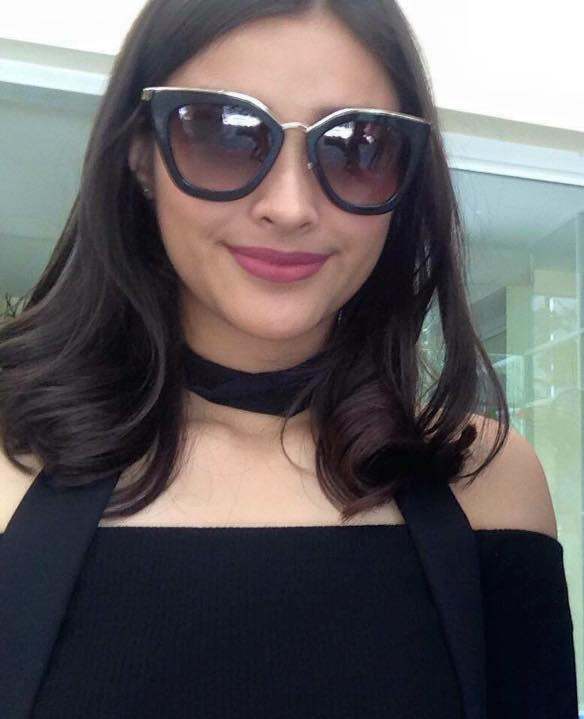
Liza Soberano portrays Sophia "Pie" Taylor.

- Enrique Gil as Drake "Draky" Sison
- Liza Soberano as Sophia "Pie" Taylor
- Yayo Aguila as Tita Veronica / Tita V
- Yves Flores as Andre
- Sue Ramirez as Driana Sison
- Alex Diaz as Marcus
- Jon Lucas as Ivan
- Chienna Filomeno as Cassidy

=== Supporting cast ===
- Myrtle Sarrosa as Bea
- Miguel Vergara as Matt
- Anjo Damiles as Ricky
- Marco Gumabao as Skye
- Erin Ocampo as Chloe
- Kyra Custodio as Jamie

=== Special participation ===
- Tonton Gutierrez as Theodore Sison
- Sunshine Cruz as Cecilia Sison
- Ricky Davao as Arthur Taylor
- Maris Racal as Amy (cameo)

== Soundtracks ==
The theme song of the movie is called "Smile In Your Heart", an OPM classic given a fresh take by Filipino all-male group, Harana. The song was originally sung by Jam Morales and then by Ariel Rivera. Liza Soberano & Enrique Gil recorded a cover of the same theme song.

== Box office ==
The film earned ₱12 million on its first day of showing. And after a couple of weeks of showing, it earned over ₱100 million. This was revealed by Star Cinema's Advertising and Promotions Manager Mico del Rosario through his Twitter post on, June 29.

== Awards and nominations ==
Year	Award	Category	Recipient(s)	Result
2015	RAWR Awards	Movie of the Year	Just The Way You Are	Nominated
2015	Star Cinema Online Awards	Favorite Male Movie Star	Enrique Gil	Nominated
2015	Star Cinema Online Awards	Favorite Female Movie Star	Liza Soberano	Nominated
2015	Star Cinema Online Awards	Favorite Kilig Moment	Liza Soberano and Enrique Gil	Nominated
2015	Star Cinema Online Awards	Favorite Movie	Liza Soberano and Enrique Gil	Nominated
2016	47th GMMSF Box-Office Entertainment Awards	Most Popular Love Team of Movies and TV	Liza Soberano and Enrique Gil	Won
2016	32nd PMPC Star Awards For Movies	Movie Child Performer of the Year	Miguel Vergara	Nominated
2016	32nd PMPC Star Awards For Movies	New Movie Actress of the Year	Sue Ramirez	Nominated

== See also ==
- List of Philippine films based on Wattpad stories
