= Liza Soberano =

Filipino and American actress (born 1998)

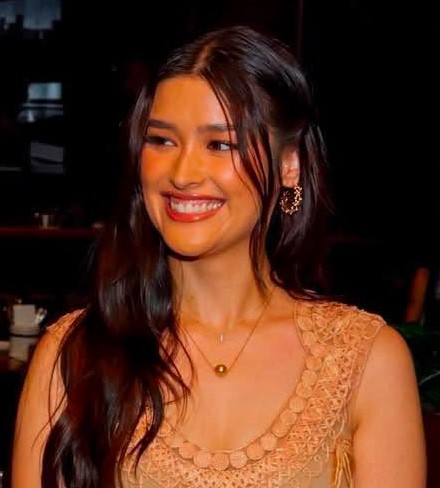
- Soberano in 2026
- Born: Hope Elizabeth Soberano; January 4, 1998 (age 28); Santa Clara, California, U.S.
- Citizenship: United States; Philippines
- Occupation: Actress
- Years active: 2011–present
- Works: Roles and awards

Signature
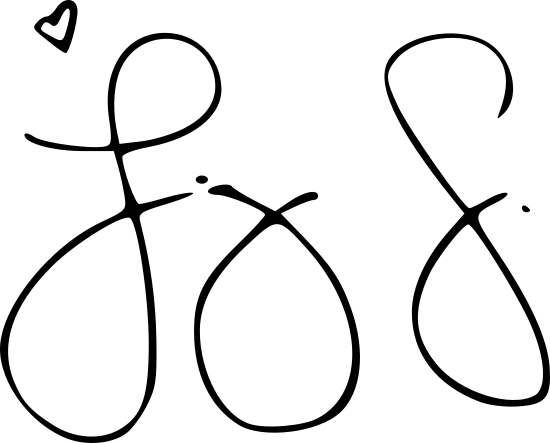

Hope Elizabeth Soberano (born January 4, 1998) is a Filipino and American actress. Known for playing supporting characters in dramas and comedies as a teenager, she has since expanded her repertoire to leading roles in television and film. She has received several major accolades, including a FAMAS Award, a PMPC Star Award, and six Box Office Entertainment Awards. Tatler Asia named her one of the most influential people in Asia in 2022 and 2023.

Born in Santa Clara, California, Soberano relocated to Quezon City and began her career as a model at thirteen. She made her television debut in the fantasy anthology series Wansapanataym (2011), before her breakthrough in the second season of the romantic drama series Got to Believe (2014). She gained wider recognition for portraying the strawberry plantation farmer Agnes in the romantic drama series Forevermore (2014), which was the first of her collaborations with actor Enrique Gil.

Soberano found commercial success in several romantic films, including My Ex and Whys (2017), for which she earned the Box Office Entertainment Award for Box Office Queen. Attempting to shed her image as an on-screen couple with Gil, she sought roles in other genres and debuted as a voice actress in the animated series Trese (2021). In 2022, she returned to California to pursue an acting career in Hollywood; she has since starred in the horror comedy film Lisa Frankenstein (2024) and the animated fantasy comedy Forgotten Island (2026). She has been described by media publications as one of the most beautiful Filipino actresses of her generation. She is vocal about gender equality, women's rights, and mental health.

== Early life and background ==
Hope Elizabeth Soberano was born on January 4, 1998, in Santa Clara, California. Her father John is Filipino and a native of Pangasinan, whereas her mother Jacqulyn is an American from San Jose, California. Shortly after her birth, Soberano's parents separated. Her mother suffered from a crystal meth addiction, which her brother inherited at birth. Jacqulyn and Michael, her boyfriend at the time, were arrested after the latter kidnapped Soberano and her brother.

Her maternal grandparents Jeff, who served in the U.S. Navy, and Divina, a bank teller, adopted her. However, she and her brother were transferred to the foster care system due to concerns that her grandparents were too old to be their guardians. On the Can I Come In? podcast, Soberano alleged that her adoptive mother Melissa was severely abusive. She detailed incidents such as Melissa forcing Soberano to clean dog feces with her tongue. She and her brother returned to their grandparents after a social worker made a surprise visit and saw signs of abuse on Soberano's body. She has five half-brothers and three half-sisters from her parents' second marriages. Soberano and her grandparents later moved to Visalia, California. She considered them as adoptive parents and has stated "it always made me feel awkward when I would [say] grandma or grandpa"; she instead would refer to them as her "mommy and daddy".

As a child, Soberano wanted to become a nurse or enlist in the U.S. Army. She was drawn to the latter because of her maternal grandfather's background in military service. She became interested in modeling after watching the reality series America's Next Top Model, but saw it as an unlikely career choice. At age ten, she relocated to the Philippines and lived with her father in Pangasinan. Soberano developed an interest in acting after watching Filipino drama series such as Tayong Dalawa, Agua Bendita, and Mara Clara, despite not knowing the language. After several years, the family moved to Quezon City. At thirteen, she began appearing in television commercials and print media. Around this time, a talent scout found her on social media and introduced her to artist manager Ogie Diaz. However, a week before they met, she had signed a one-year deal with GMA Network's talent management group. At Diaz's urging, Soberano asked to be released from her contract, which then had a thirty-day waiver; she eventually signed with Diaz and he recommended that Soberano learn to speak in Tagalog in order to get acting jobs.

== Career ==
=== 2011–2015: Early roles and breakthrough ===
Introduced as Hope Soberano, she began her career with a minor part in a 2011 episode of ABS-CBN's fantasy anthology television series Wansapanataym. The following year, she received her first part as a series regular when she joined the cast of the afternoon drama television series Kung Ako'y Iiwan Mo (2012). Playing the supporting role of Claire, younger sister of Paul (played by Jake Cuenca), she found that being in the drama to be an important learning experience which shaped her work ethic, and said in a 2018 interview that since earning her first salary from the project, she became the family breadwinner. During the time, she underwent a series of acting workshops and took on singing lessons. Before her cinematic debut in the coming-of-age romantic comedy film Must Be... Love (2013), she adopted the stage name Liza Soberano, taken from her middle name, at the suggestion of Star Creatives executive Malou Santos. In Must Be... Love, Soberano played a young girl caught in a love triangle between Daniel Padilla and Kathryn Bernardo; reviews criticized the film and their performances for the overdone clichés and formulaic plot. Later that year, she appeared in the romantic drama film She's the One (2013), co-starring Dingdong Dantes and Bea Alonzo.

Soberano's breakthrough came when she portrayed the love interest of Daniel Padilla's character in the second season of romantic drama television series Got to Believe, which aired from January to March 2014. Although she considered the role a turning point in her career, Soberano found it disconcerting to play the "third wheel" for a second time. She next starred opposite Enrique Gil in Cathy Garcia-Sampana (Note: at the time, credited as "Cathy Garcia-Molina")'s romantic drama television series Forevermore (2014). Set in La Trinidad, Benguet, the story followed two teenagers from different social classes who fall in love. She portrayed Agnes, a strawberry farmer who supervises hotel magnate Xander (Gil) after he is forced to work on the plantation. The production received a PMPC Star Award for Best Primetime Drama Series nomination, and Soberano was named Most Promising Female Star at the 2015 Box Office Entertainment Awards.

In 2015, Soberano starred in two romance films with Gil: Just the Way You Are and Everyday I Love You. In Theodore Boborol's romantic comedy Just the Way You Are, she played Sophia Taylor, an awkward, unattractive American expatriate who is seduced by an egotistic womanizer named Drake Sison (Gil) as a result of a bet. The film is an adaptation of Kimberly Joy Villanueva's Wattpad romance novel The Bet. Critical reaction to the film was negative; Oggs Cruz from Rappler termed it "completely generic" and "utterly forgettable", though he credited Soberano for lending her appeal and charm. She then starred in the Mae Cruz-Alviar-directed romantic drama Everyday I Love You. Filmed in Negros Occidental, it featured her as a woman whose boyfriend (played by Gerald Anderson) falls into a coma and she later falls in love with another man. The Philippine Daily Inquirer's Rito Asilo noted how much Soberano's "disarming dramatic perspicacity and appealing presence" aided the narrative. Abigail Mendoza of the Philippine Entertainment Portal wrote, "She is a natural who displays the right restraint, pleasing to watch all the more since she doesn't try too hard." Both films were commercially successful, each grossing over ₱100 million (US$2.2 million), and earned Soberano and Gil the Box Office Entertainment Award for Most Popular Love Team.

=== 2016–2020: Rise to prominence ===
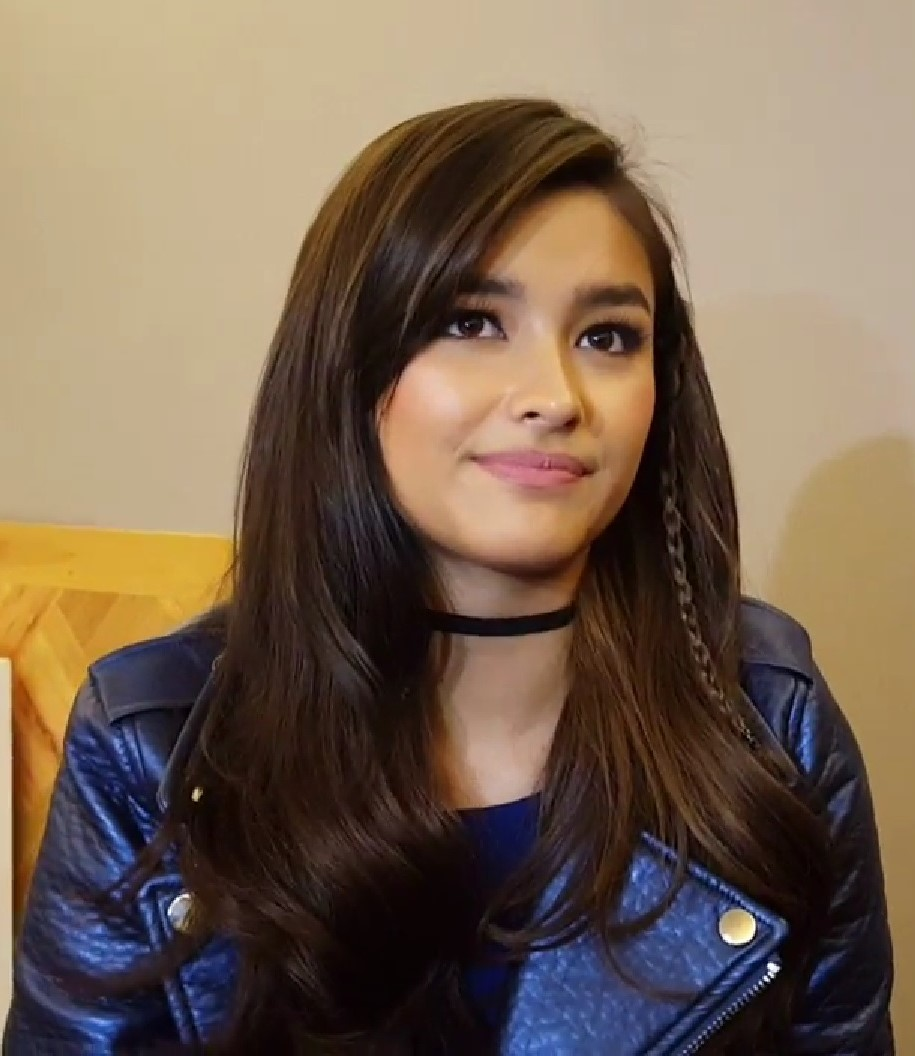
Soberano during an interview in 2016

Dolce Amore (transl. Sweet Love), her next romantic drama series with Gil, premiered in 2016. It was shot in Rome and Florence, and was directed by Garcia-Sampana again. Soberano starred as Serena Marchesa, a young aristocrat forced to marry her childhood friend Giancarlo de Luca (Matteo Guidicelli) but leaves for Manila and falls in love with Simon Vicente "Tenten" Ibarra (Gil), an impoverished man working as a male escort. In preparation for the part, Soberano learned to speak Italian and worked closely with co-actor Ruben Maria Soriquez, who served as the cast's dialect coach. Nestor Torre Jr. of the Philippine Daily Inquirer took note of her acting versatility and praised her as the production's highlight. For the role, Soberano was nominated for a PMPC Star Award for Best Drama Actress.

The romantic drama film My Ex and Whys (2017) starred Soberano as Cali Ferrer, a blogger who must work with her ex-boyfriend Gio Martinez (Gil) after their online conversations with each other go viral. Cosmopolitan Philippines' Jacina A. Lopez remarked that although My Ex and Whys is far from a "cinematic art film", she appreciated it for being "comfortable, safe, and warm". She also praised Soberano's performance, which she believed was one of the actress' "most mature" so far. The director, Garcia-Sampana, wanted Soberano to dissociate from the persona she portrayed in Dolce Amore, and thus asked her to "act lighter" and play the part by de-glamorizing. She found herself challenged by her character's pain and struggled to draw from real-life experience, as she had never experienced a break-up. Mari-An Santos of the Philippine Entertainment Portal commended Soberano and Gil's chemistry in the film. Oggs Cruz from Rappler dismissed the unoriginal plot and thought Soberano's performance lacked depth. With earnings of more than ₱400 million (US$7.94 million), My Ex and Whys was one of the highest-grossing Filipino films of the year. Soberano subsequently received the Box Office Entertainment Award for Box Office Queen. Also that year, she took on a starring role in an episode of the anthology television series Maalaala Mo Kaya (transl. Do You Remember), portraying Pia Wurtzbach who became known for winning Miss Universe 2015.

In 2018, Soberano starred as the tribal heroine Ganda in the epic fantasy television series Bagani. Set in the fictional kingdom of Sansinukob, the series followed a series of conflicts among the noble warriors from five regions of the realm. It featured flight sequences that required her to perform stunts while strapped into harnesses, and to prepare for the role, she trained in wushu. While filming, Soberano injured herself and sustained an arm fracture. The series was heavily criticized by media critics for whitewashing its characters; Soberano's role was meant to be a pre-colonial native of the Philippines. Dan Maglinong of Interaksyon observed that she was famous for her "Caucasian features" and was required to paint her skin darker to portray Ganda. In response, Soberano emphasized that her father is fully Filipino and that she grew up in Filipino culture. Despite the backlash, Soberano was nominated for Best Drama Actress at the 2018 PMPC Star Awards for Television.

The following year, Soberano continued to collaborate with Gil in a romantic drama film Alone/Together (2019), written and directed by Antoinette Jadaone. Playing a college couple who go through a series of relationship struggles, the pair spent some time immersing in academic experiences to prepare; she attended classes at the University of the Philippines Diliman, while Gil visited a hospital to interact with medical students. Pablo Tariman of The Philippine Star praised her "well-defined" portrayal of an overwhelmed character, and Oggs Cruz called her a "formidable performer". The film was a commercial success, grossing over ₱380 million (US$7.34 million) at the box office.

Soberano and Gil starred in what would turn out to be their final project in primetime television: the romantic drama television series Make It with You, which aired from January to March 2020. Filmed in Dubrovnik, Croatia, it featured Soberano as a struggling overseas worker and con artist who deceives an undocumented migrant (played by Gil). She was drawn to the idea of exploring a distinct "visual experience" for her character and thus cut her hair short to look drastically different from her performances in the past. In preparation, she watched the film Erin Brockovich (2000) which, in Soberano's view, embodied a "free spirited" persona. Production of the series was halted due to the COVID-19 pandemic, and in June 2020, following the shutdown of ABS-CBN, Make It with You was ultimately cancelled.

=== 2021–present: Career expansion ===
Dismayed at being typecast due to her love team with Gil, Soberano actively looked for parts in other genres. She found an opportunity with the Netflix animated series Trese (2021), based on Budjette Tan and Kajo Baldisimo's graphic novel. She provided her voice to the titular protagonist Alexandra Trese, a detective who deals with crimes of supernatural origin. Reception of her voice acting was mixed; Kathleen Llemit of The Philippine Star thought that her delivery had "dynamics" but contained "almost the exact same cadence", and Rappler's Emil Hofileña criticized her disjointed performance and considered her miscast. In 2022, Soberano returned to the United States to pursue an acting career in Hollywood. She became aware of a comedy horror film, written by Diablo Cody and directed by Zelda Williams, of which a supporting part was yet to be cast. Soberano initially had doubts, but was eventually encouraged by Williams to pursue the role. She found the script to be "everything that I hoped and dreamed for", calling it an "all-in-one project".

Lisa Frankenstein (2024) starred Kathryn Newton as the titular Lisa, a misunderstood teenage girl who meets and falls in love with a re-animated Victorian-era corpse (played by Cole Sprouse). In the film, Soberano portrayed Taffy, Lisa's step-sister. The Hollywood Reporter's Brian Davids described the role as a "quintessential Type A personality". Soberano collaborated closely with Cody and Williams to create Taffy's origin and studied teen films to prepare for the role, drawing inspiration from Ferris Bueller's Day Off's Sloane (Mia Sara) in particular. The film performed poorly at the box office, but critics were generally enthusiastic about her performance and considered Soberano to be a scene-stealer among the cast. Katie Walsh of the Los Angeles Times called her the project's "breakout star and true discovery". Mick LaSalle from the San Francisco Chronicle dismissed the film as an "unfunny, disgusting mess", but deemed Soberano as the only notable aspect of the production.

On March 2, 2024, Soberano attended the Crunchyroll Anime Awards for the first time, and served as a presenter for the Best Anime Song award. In April of the same year, she served as a jury member in the inaugural Ho Chi Minh City International Film Festival. On October 29, 2025, The Hollywood Reporter announced that Soberano would voice Raissa, one of the main characters in the DreamWorks animated film Forgotten Island, which was released on September 25, 2026. Soberano will next star in the coming-of-age drama film Patron Saints of Nothing, based on the 2019 novel by Randy Ribay, and co-starring Brandon Perea and Jon Jon Briones.

== Reception and public image ==
"The thing that I love most about acting is being able to portray different people, different characters ... I think as an artist, it just makes me feel so empowered, to hone such a skill or talent ... It helps me just better understand how people operate, again empathize with things that go on in other people's lives."

— Soberano on acting

Town & Country has named Soberano as one of Hollywood's "brightest new stars" and "exciting young actors" in 2023. As part of a career analysis, Mariane Perez of Vogue Philippines observed that Soberano began as a young performer "out of relative obscurity", but later emerged as one of the Philippines' most accomplished actresses after starring in several successful films and television series. She is known for playing in a range of roles and Perez credits that she is "imbued with a certain self-awareness" in her performances. Perez praised Soberano for stepping outside her comfort zone by accepting parts that might initially seem against type, as she had done in her film debut in Hollywood. Sophie Agustin from Cosmopolitan Philippines wrote that at the beginning of her career, Soberano was often typecast into playing "third wheel characters", an apparent limitation she escaped following her collaborations with Enrique Gil playing lead roles. In a discussion of her career trajectory, the Philippine Entertainment Portal has profiled her as a "top-rating prime-time actress [and] a blockbuster movie star", citing her talent and diligent work as significant factors in her rise. The writer Romy Antonette Peña Cruz, also from the same publication, attributed Soberano's success as an actress to her willingness to rely on her acting talent rather than her perceived beauty. Regarding her approach to acting, Soberano has commented that she views dissociating from herself as an obvious requirement in her portrayals, remarking, "It's like allowing myself to completely kind of let go of everything that makes me, me."

Commenting on her performance in Alone/Together, Pablo Tariman of The Philippine Star called it an "acting so well-defined" which she "immersed into with quiet but smoldering result". while Cathy Garcia-Sampana, who directed Soberano in My Ex and Whys, considered her "comedic side" to be a revelation. Describing her off-screen personality, actress Kira Balinger praised Soberano's "humble approach to fame", and the Asian Journal's Monet Lu found her to be "very amiable", adding that "her simplicity just makes her even more attractive". Discussing her traits in a 2022 interview, Soberano has acknowledged that she is a "people pleaser to a fault".

Throughout her career, Soberano has been a frequent collaborator of Gil, appearing in many films and television series with the actor. Together, they were part of a "love team", a romantic on-screen couple from which she has achieved commercial success, bolstering her reputation as one of the Philippines' preeminent talents. However, she struggled to find serious roles or ones that did not involve projects with Gil: "In love teams, you're expected to just be with that one person throughout your career and in your personal life and, like, people don't wanna see you aside with another male actor." Soberano used that fear of being pigeonholed as motivation to build a versatile body of work. She cites actress Dolly de Leon as an inspiration for her acting pursuits after the latter received international acclaim.

Soberano's public image is strongly tied to her perceived beauty and appeal. She has been cited as one of the most beautiful faces in the Philippine entertainment industry by many sources. She has been described by Metro magazine as a style icon, with her "angelic eyes, symmetrical features, a refined nose and lips" as her trademark features. The American Vogue credits the actress for her "carefully curated wardrobe", writing that she embodies "youthful, fresh, and with an understated elegance". In 2017, Soberano topped TC Candler and The Independent Critics's listing of the "100 Most Beautiful Faces in World", and has been included in its annual compilation on eight other occasions—2015 to 2023. She was named the "Most Beautiful Star" by Yes! in 2018, and was recognized by Tatler Asia as one of the most influential people in Asia in 2022 and 2023.

== Advocacy ==
Soberano is a gender equality advocate and supports women's and children's rights. She is vocal about social and political issues, asserting, "I find it so important to start spreading awareness to future generations as early as now". She identifies as a feminist, a concept she argues should not intimidate people because society has always "conditioned women and children to stay quiet when dealing with hardships and struggles". In 2020, she partnered with the human rights organization Gabriela National Alliance of Filipino Women and spoke during the International Day of the Girl Child in favor of free speech and a safer space for young women. This participation led to trolling and red-tagging from military government officials, spreading public misinformation of her being allied with the communist group New People's Army.

Soberano has also lent her support to several charitable organizations such as the ICanServe Foundation, Chosen Children Village, and Anawim Home for the Elderly. She was named a Save the Children Fund Ambassador in 2021, and fronted an awareness campaign in lobbying for the passage of the Raising the Age of Sexual Consent Law, which increased the age of consent from 12 to 16; she worked closely with the bill's sponsors and advocates. Amidst the COVID-19 pandemic, Soberano, along with Gil, raised funds in support of disadvantaged families and children transitioning to e-learning.

Teased as a child for her weight and issues with her skin such as rashes due to her allergies, Soberano takes a stand against body-shaming and bullying. She also promotes mental health, and launched a podcast, titled An Open Mind, which premiered in January 2022 and ran for 12 episodes. In a 2024 interview, Soberano has publicly acknowledged her mental health struggles, stating, "That was coming from like, just years of focusing on work and not really getting to, I guess, be fully present in my childhood." She has campaigned for access to affordable mental health care services for underprivileged communities in the Philippines. She has expressed support for Palestine.

== Personal life ==
Soberano holds dual citizenship of the United States and the Philippines.

She began dating Enrique Gil in 2014, and they publicly announced their relationship in an article published by Yes! magazine in 2017; their relationship ended in October 2022, although this was only confirmed by Soberano in an unreleased interview in March 2023. In August 2025, Soberano confirmed her breakup with Gil on the podcast-documentary "Can I Come In?" by filmmaker Sarah Bahbah.

She is reticent to discuss her personal life on social media and refuses to share posts involving her family. On her desire to be private, she has said that she fears unwanted criticisms directed to people close to her. Soberano shares a close relationship with her siblings, in particular her paternal half-brother, Justin, and said: "I would do everything for him". She has expressed her fondness for her profession, but has acknowledged that being a "celebrity" was not something she wanted. When discussing her personal life, she has said that she enjoys domestic routines like grocery shopping, cooking, and doing home repairs.

Soberano joined the Screen Actors Guild in 2024. She has been a spokesperson for many brands, including Maybelline, Samsung (Galaxy Z Flip 3), Cetaphil, GCash, and Jollibee Foods Corporation. She also serves as the Chief Advocacy Officer for the digital banking company Maya. Soberano has studied psychology and considered being a mental health counselor.

== Filmography and awards ==
According to the online portal Box Office Mojo, Soberano's most commercially successful films include Just The Way You Are, Everyday I Love You, My Ex and Whys, and Alone/Together. Her films as a leading actress have grossed over ₱1 billion (US$17.3 million) worldwide, making her one of the highest-grossing Filipino actors of all time. Soberano's television drama projects include Kung Ako'y Iiwan Mo, Got to Believe, Forevermore, Dolce Amore, Bagani, Make It with You, and Blood vs Duty.

After her breakthrough, Soberano has been a recipient of six Box Office Entertainment Awards: three times as Most Popular Love Team with Gil, Most Promising Female Star of the Year in 2015, Box Office Queen in 2018, and Princess of Philippine Movies and Television in 2020. She has also been nominated for three PMPC Star Awards for Television and two PMPC Star Awards for Movies. In addition, she has received two German Moreno citations: the Power Tandem Award from the Star Awards for Television in 2015, and the Youth Achievement Award from the FAMAS Awards in 2020.
