= Alone/Together =

2019 Filipino romance film

- Theatrical release poster
- Directed by: Antoinette Jadaone
- Written by: Antoinette Jadaone
- Produced by: Antoinette Jadaone; Dan Villegas
- Starring: Liza Soberano; Enrique Gil
- Cinematography: Neil Daza
- Edited by: Benjamin Tolentino; Ilsa Malsi
- Music by: Len Calvo
- Production companies: Black Sheep Productions; Project 8 Projects
- Distributed by: ABS-CBN Films
- Release date: February 13, 2019
- Running time: 103 minutes
- Country: Philippines
- Languages: Filipino; English
- Box office: ₱370 million

Alone/Together is a 2019 Filipino romantic drama film written and directed by Antoinette Jadaone. Starring Liza Soberano and Enrique Gil, it follows the love story of Christine and Raf, who cross paths again five years after they broke up.

A co-production of Black Sheep Productions and Project 8 Projects and distributed by Star Cinema, the film was theatrically released on February 13, 2019.

== Plot ==
While touring students at the National Museum of the Philippines, Christine "Tin" Lazaro, an Art Studies major at the University of the Philippines Diliman and volunteer tour guide, meets Rafael "Raf" Toledo, a University of Santo Tomas pre-medical student and an avid fan of the Eraserheads. They find themselves debating the comparison between the museum's famous painting, Juan Luna's Spoliarium, which Raf's favorite song is named after. They soon begin dating and eventually become a couple. Raf dreams of becoming a doctor while Tin aspires to be a museum director. She also dreams of visiting the Metropolitan Museum of Art and other museums in New York. But their relationship falls apart when Tin is involved in a money scandal at her work. She is saved by Gregory "Greg" Fausto, a coworker who likes her. She breaks up with Raf when he is not able to graduate again. Raf initially proposes to Tin, to avoid losing her, but Tin refuses and breaks up with Raf.

Five years later, Tin, who is now in a relationship with Greg, accompanies him at an awarding ceremony. There, she also sees Raf, now a doctor and also an award recipient. Raf waited for Tin in the hallway after she came from the bathroom, hoping to start a conversation and eventually asking her if they can see each other sometime. When the two meet again at their common dating spot, they catch up, and eventually, Tin finally tells him about what happened five years before. Their conversation is cut short when Raf is called to the hospital for an emergency. Tin accompanies him and sees how Raf's working has changed, diligently and passionately, in his chosen profession. After attending to his patient, Raf walks in and introduces Tin to Aly, a fellow doctor and his current girlfriend, mildly surprising the former.

Tin is working for Greg's company, and while she excels at performing her job, she does not feel respected and recognized by Greg. Raf and Tin decided to visit the National Museum together; Tin revealed to Raf that this was her first time visiting a museum or any gallery after the scandal happened. She added that she refused to go near things that would remind her of what she used to be. Tin also shared with Raf that there is a chance at her current work to fly to New York, and that if she is still the same person, she would fight her way to be on that trip, especially if it means visiting the museums there. With Raf's encouragement, Tin reconsidered her decision and asked Greg if she can be considered to represent their company. Greg, initially doubtful, eventually agrees to let Tin take the lead.

While in New York City, Tin accomplished her business goals and then visited the Met. But unbeknownst to her, Raf has also purchased a ticket to New York to join her and fulfill their dreams to visit museums together. In one of their visits, Tin meets Alex, a Filipino US-based car dealer and former artist; they share a quick conversation about each other, and Tin asks if she could see Alex's artworks, to which the latter happily agrees. After the museum visit, Tin asked the museum for application form copies as souvenirs and took a rest in the park. There, Raf reveals that he broke up with Aly and wants to resume his relationship and eventually marry Tin. Torn between doing the right things for the people around her versus doing the right thing for her, she sadly rejects his proposal, stating that she would hurt Greg and his daughter Aisha if she marries him. They argue further, but they eventually part ways.

Upon returning to the Philippines, Tin realizes and admits that she is not happy with her current life and breaks up with Greg. She seeks out Raf to tell him of her decision, but he reveals that Aly is pregnant with his child. Feeling lost, but at the same time hopeful, Tin visits her alma mater and sits in on one of the classes facilitated by her favorite professor, Sir Alwyn. After getting advice from her former college professor, Tin rebuilds her life. After failing to secure a job one interview after another, she eventually landed a job in a museum because of her transparency about her past mistake. She started her new job, beginning to feel fulfilled and once again, passionate. She later visits Raf at the hospital and apologizes to him for being selfish and a coward. Raf apologizes too for his rash behavior the last time they saw each other. He also reveals that he is estranged from Aly. Before the conversation could go any further, he gets called in again, but before he walks out, Tin tells him that she still loves him.

Tin continues rebuilding her life around the things she is passionate about. She drives to the National Museum to attend an awarding ceremony for emerging local artists, which includes Alex. In her speech, Alex thanks Tin for making her realize that there is life for her in the Philippines as an artist and concludes that even art is often seen as a form of self-expression, it should always serve the people they belong to. Alex ends her speech by inviting Tin to the stage, and the two share a hug. As Tin leaves the museum after the ceremony, she finds Raf waiting for her, and the two tearfully hug. The film ends with Tin meeting Raf and his son, looking at the Spoliarium.

== Cast ==
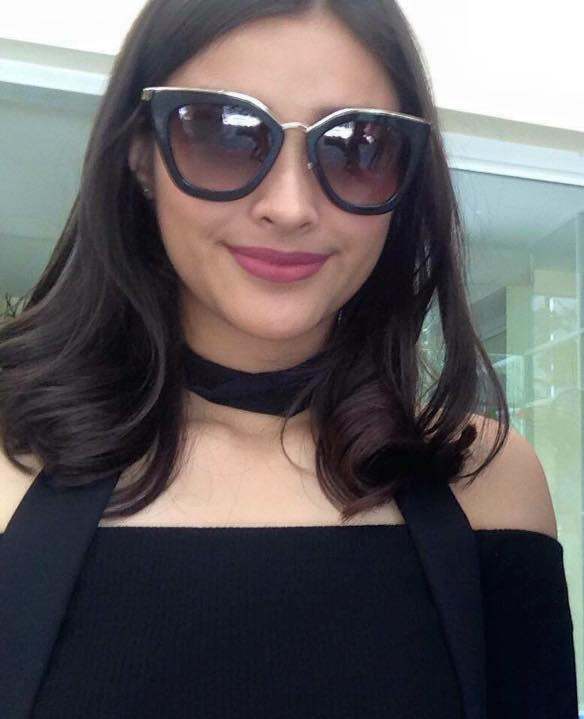
Liza Soberano portrays Christine "Tin" M. Lazaro

- Liza Soberano as Christine "Tin" M. Lazaro, a Magna Cum Laude graduate from the BA Art Studies Program of UP Diliman, and dreams of becoming a museum director at renowned attractions like the Metropolitan Museum of Art and the Louvre.
- Enrique Gil as Rafael "Raf" F. Toledo, a BS Biology student from the University of Santo Tomas whose goal is only to graduate.
- Jasmine Curtis-Smith as Aly, an ER intern and Raf's current girlfriend.
- Sylvia Sanchez as Hilda M. Lazaro, Tin's mom
- Nonie Buencamino as Sir Alwyn, Tin's professor and mentor during her college years.
- Adrian Alandy as Gregory "Greg" Fausto, Tin's boss and boyfriend.
- Xia Vigor as Aisha Fausto, Greg's daughter from his previous relationship.

== Reception ==
=== Box office ===
Black Sheep announced that Alone/Together raked in a total of P21,672,901.58 on its opening day. The figures increased in more than P123 million in 4 days. The film crossed over the ₱200 million mark in 9 days. The film earned P350 million on its fourth week. As of June 2019, the filmed grossed P370 million worldwide.

=== Critical response ===
Oggs Cruz, writing for Rappler, reviewed the film thus, “Alone/Together” is a film that is clearly within the genre that aspires for escape from the real world. However, it actually treads that real world, looking, with the help of Neil Daza’s precise lensing, more forlorn and palpable than just pretty and glossy. The conspiracy between the mechanics of a romance and palatable realness is strange at first, until it all makes beautiful sense. He praised Soberano as a formidable performer, an actress who can go beyond innate charisma to draw her audience into her character’s plight. In a gesture that is very mature, Gil generously grants Soberano the spotlight, allowing his character to stay as a support.

Je CC from Lionheartv wrote “‘Alone/Together’, is liberal; its haunting illustration of a highly vulnerable love affair, tried under the curbs of time and personal differences. There is a consummate lens through which the film’s themes are dissected. The idea of people striving to make their romance work amid their individual pursuit of their respective dreams and wants, is treated with a grounded sensibility that gives Alone/Together, a distinctive character, cognizant of its need to be more than the conventions from its mainstream contemporaries that tend to fully embrace.”

Pablo Tariman of The Philippine Star gave the film generally positive reviews and praised Soberano stating “you see a different Liza in the role that she has immersed into with quiet but smoldering result. The eyes speak a lot. This is Liza at her best without turning to the kilig factor as her savior. She invests her role with quiet intensity between love and disgust and personal confusion. This is acting so well-defined and away from the demands of inane love teams.”

== Release ==
The film premiered on cinemas in the Philippines on February 13, 2019. Alone/Together started its international screenings in the month of February in Taiwan, United Arab Emirates, Bahrain, Oman, Papua New Guinea, Qatar, Canada, Fiji, Austria, UK, Sweden, Spain, Ireland, Italy, Australia, Brunei, and New Zealand. On March 1, 2 and 3, the film premiered in Israel, Italy, Northern Mariana Islands, Finland, Cyprus, Denmark, France, Greece, Italy, and Malta. On April 4, the film premiered in Saudi Arabia.

The film was also showcased during ASEAN Cinema Week 2019 in Busan and Seoul, South Korea from November to December. It also had a regular screening in Cambodia in January 2020.

The film was made available for streaming on Netflix in the Philippines starting November 5, 2020.

== Awards and nominations ==
Year	Award	Category	Recipient(s)	Result
2019	9th EdukCircle Awards	Most Influential Film Actor of the Year	Enrique Gil	Won
2019	9th EdukCircle Awards	Most Influential Film Actress of the Year	Liza Soberano	Won
2020	51st GMMSF Box-Office Entertainment Awards	Prince of Philippine Movies and Television	Enrique Gil	Won
2020	51st GMMSF Box-Office Entertainment Awards	Princess of Philippine Movies and Television	Liza Soberano	Won
2020	51st GMMSF Box-Office Entertainment Awards	Most Popular Love Team for Movies	Liza Soberano and Enrique Gil	Won
2020	Push Awards	Push Male Movie Performance of the Year	Enrique Gil	Won
2020	VP Choice Awards	Movie Actor of the Year	Enrique Gil	Nominated
2020	VP Choice Awards	Movie Actress of the Year	Liza Soberano	Nominated
