= She's the One (2013 film) =

She's The One
- Theatrical movie poster
- Directed by: Mae Cruz-Alviar
- Written by: Vanessa R. Valdez; Roumella Niña L. Monge; Charlene Sawit-Esguerra; Anton C. Santamaria
- Produced by: Charo Santos-Concio; Malou N. Santos
- Starring: Bea Alonzo; Dingdong Dantes; Enrique Gil
- Cinematography: Dan Villegas
- Edited by: Marya Ignacio
- Music by: Cesar Francis Concio
- Production company: ABS-CBN Film Productions, Inc.
- Distributed by: Star Cinema; TFC
- Release date: October 16, 2013
- Running time: 110 minutes
- Country: Philippines
- Languages: Filipino; English
- Box office: ₱137 million (5 weeks)

She's the One is a 2013 Filipino romantic comedy-drama film directed by Mae Cruz-Alviar from a story and screenplay by Vanessa R. Valdez, Roumella Niña L. Monge, Charlene Sawit-Esguerra, and Anton C. Santamaria. It stars Bea Alonzo, Dingdong Dantes and Enrique Gil.

Produced and distributed by Star Cinema as part of its 20th anniversary presentation, the film was theatrically released on October 16, 2013.

== Plot ==
Wacky and Cat are childhood best friends. Cat is in love with Wacky, but the two have a fight and Cat decides to go home. On the way, one of her car tires goes flat while it is raining. David sees her fixing her car, and records it on video. David falls in love with her instantly, and posts the video on the internet entitled "Girl in the Rain", which goes viral. David's best friend, Gillian does not want him to meet the "Girl in the Rain". Wacky helps David look for the girl, not knowing that it is Cat. Meanwhile, Cat's mentally challenged sister watches the video and points out that it is Cat. At first, Wacky cannot convince Cat to meet David, but she eventually agrees.

David and Cat fall in love with each other and Wacky realizes that he could have told Cat in the first place that he loved her but it is too late. Wacky tries to impress Cat with the dance he practiced with his friends but then they witness David and Cat kissing. After sometime, the two lovers are seen by Gillian kissing, making her scream in surprise and envy. This surprises Cat and David and the two fall down the stairs, breaking one of their arms. Wacky uses this to let Cat know that he loves her. One night, Wacky tries to tell Cat what his feelings but David interferes. At David's car, he tells Cat that he wants Wacky out of her life because it makes him uncomfortable, so she confesses her feelings for Wacky. The two lovers have a fight, which almost makes them break up. In a bar, David calls Wacky and insults him while drunk before Gillian stops him.

Cat and Wacky go to the bar and talk to David, who tells Wacky the truth that Cat loves Wacky. They accompany David home, Gillian confesses her feelings for David to Cat and tells her that she only sees girls chase David but Cat is the only girl that David ever chased. She tells Cat that she was jealous of her and as a friend, she feels bad for David. Wacky finally confesses his feelings to Cat and Cat replies that they could have been together had he told her sooner. David finally lets go of Cat and realizes that he loves Gillian and the two became a couple. On Cat's birthday, Wacky and his friends set him up with Cat and the two finally became a couple.

== Cast ==
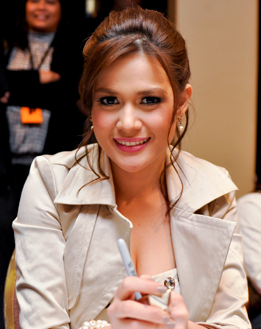
Bea Alonzo portrays Cat Aguinaldo

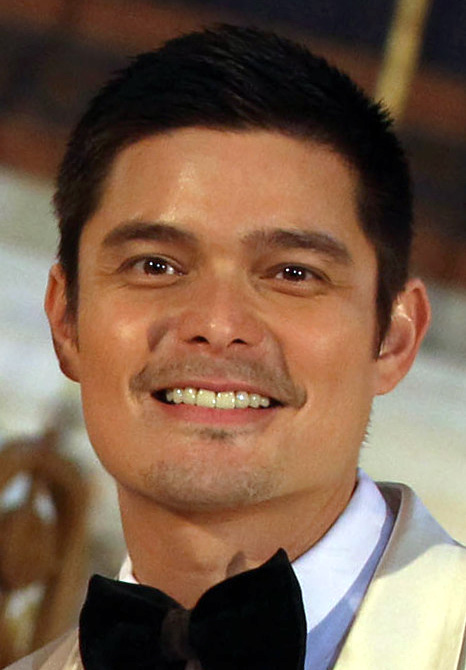
Dingdong Dante portrays Wacky Delos Reyes

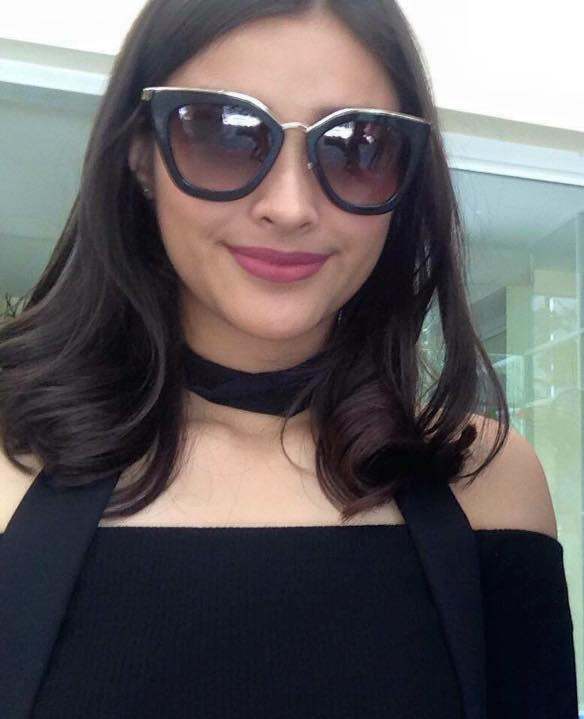
Liza Soberano portrays Gillian

=== Main Cast ===
- Bea Alonzo as Cat Aguinaldo
- Dingdong Dantes as Wacky Delos Reyes
- Enrique Gil as David Esguerra
- Liza Soberano as Gillian
- Pinky Amador as Judith
- RS Francisco as Tony
- Guji Lorenzana as Mike
- Coleen Garcia as Mandy
- Daniel Matsunaga as Jason
- LJ Reyes as Patty
- Erika Padilla as Jessie
- Marc Solis as Pao
- Barbie Sabino as Carrie
- Timothy Lambert Chan as Coby
- Arlene Tolibas as Perla
- Cheska Iñigo as Vicky
- Sofia Andres as Claire
- Leo Rialp as Ramon
- Perla Bautista
- Tony Mabesa

== Accolades ==
Year	Award-giving Body	Recipient	Award	Result
2014	62nd FAMAS Awards	Dingdong Dantes	Best Actor	Nominated
2014	62nd FAMAS Awards	Enrique Gil	Best Supporting Actor	Nominated
