= List of awards and nominations received by Kathryn Bernardo =

Kathryn Bernardo awards and nominations
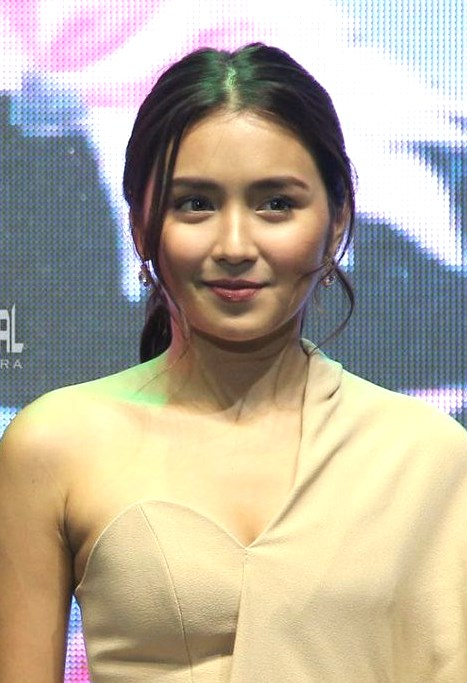
Awards and nominations
Award	Wins	Nominations

This is a list of awards, recognitions, achievements and nominations received by Kathryn Bernardo during her career.

== International Awards and Recognitions ==
=== Asian World Film Festival ===
Year	Category	Host country	Result	Ref.
2024	Snow Leopard Rising Star	USA (Los Angeles, California)	Won	

=== Asian Academy Creative Awards ===
Year	Notable Works	Category	Host country	Result	Ref.
2024	A Very Good Girl	Best Actress in a Leading Role (National Winner)	Singapore	Won	

=== Seoul International Drama Awards ===
Year	Notable Works	Category	Host country	Result	Ref.
2023	2 Good 2 Be True	Outstanding Asian Star	South Korea	Won	

=== Face of the Year Awards ===
Year	Notable Works	Category	Host country	Result	Qualification	Ref.
2016	Got to Believe	Best Foreign Actress	Vietnam	Won	Fanbase and Online Voting	
2018	Pangako Sa 'Yo	Best Foreign Actress	Vietnam	Won	Fanbase and Online Voting	

=== Kids' Choice Awards ===
Year	Category	Host country	Result	Ref.
2016	Favorite Pinoy Personality	Forum, Inglewood, California	Nominated	
2019	Favorite Trending Pinoy	Los Angeles, California	Won	

=== The Independent Critics ===
Year	Category	Host	Result	Ref.
2015	100 Most Beautiful Faces of 2015	TC Candler	Rank 80	
2016	100 Most Beautiful Faces of 2016	TC Candler	Rank 69	
2017	100 Most Beautiful Faces of 2017	TC Candler	Rank 60	

=== The World Around Us ===
Year	Category	Host	Result	Ref.
2016	10 Most Beautiful Filipina Celebrity	US Media	# 6	

=== FHM U.K. ===
Year	Category	Result	Ref.
2014	Top 10 Hottest Nations in the World	Top 5 (with Solenn Heussaff)	

== Philippine Government Awards ==
=== Iligan Youth Choice Awards ===
Year	Category	Result	Ref.
2018	Best Female Youth Model	Won	

=== Gawad Parangal sa Natatanging Anak ng Kabanatuan ===
Year	Category	Result	Ref.
2012	Natatanging Anak ng Kabanatuan	Won	

== Film and television ==
=== Cinema Exhibitors' Association of the Philippines ===
Year	Notable Works	Category	Result	Ref.
2024	Hello, Love, Again	Box Office Queen	Won	

=== Film Development Council of the Philippines ===
Year	Notable Works	Category	Result	Ref.
2018	The Hows of Us	Camera Obscura Awardee Highest Grossing Filipino Film in a Regular Screening	Won	
2018	The Hows of Us (KathNiel)	Loveteam ng Sentenaryo Sine Sandaan Luminaries Recognition	Won	

=== FAMAS Awards ===
Year	Notable Works	Category	Result	Ref.
2011	—N/a	German Moreno Youth Achievement Award (shared with Sarah Lahbati, Alden Richards, Julia Montes, and Sam Concepcion)	Won	
2014	Pagpag: Siyam na Buhay	Best Actress	Nominated	
2015	She's Dating the Gangster	Best Actress	Nominated	
2016	Crazy Beautiful You	Best Actress	Nominated	
2017	Barcelona: A Love Untold	Best Actress	Nominated	
2020	Hello, Love, Goodbye	Best Actress	Nominated	
2023	A Very Good Girl	Best Actress	Won	
2024	Hello, Love, Again	Bida sa Takilya Actress	Won	

=== PMPC Star Award for Movies ===
Year	Notable Works	Category	Result	Ref.
2016	Crazy Beautiful You	Movie Love Team of the Year (with Daniel Padilla)	Won	
2017	Barcelona: A Love Untold	Movie Actress of the Year	Nominated	
2017	Barcelona: A Love Untold	Movie Love Team of the Year (with Daniel Padilla)	Won	
2019	The Hows of Us	Best Actress (tied with Sarah Geronimo)	Won	
2019	The Hows of Us	Movie Love Team of the Year (with Daniel Padilla)	Won	
2021	Hello, Love, Goodbye	Movie Actress of the Year	Nominated	
2023	A Very Good Girl	Movie Actress of the Year	Nominated	

=== PMPC Star Awards for Television ===
Year	Notable Works	Category	Result	Ref.
2014	—N/a	German Moreno's Power Tandem Award (with Daniel Padilla)	Won	
2017	La Luna Sangre	Best Drama Actress	Nominated	
2019	—N/a	TV Queen at the Turn of the Millennium Awardee	Won	

=== GMMSF Box-Office Entertainment Awards ===
Year	Notable Works	Category	Result	Ref.
2013	—N/a	Most Promising Female Star of the Year	Won	
2013	—N/a	Most Promising Love Team (with Daniel Padilla)	Won	
2014	Pagpag: Siyam na Buhay	Princess of Philippine Movies	Won	
2015	She's Dating the Gangster	Teen Queen of Philippine Movies and Television	Won	
2016	Crazy Beautiful You	Princess of Philippine Movies	Won	
2017	Barcelona: A Love Untold	Box Office Queen	Won	
2018	Can't Help Falling in Love	Princess of Philippine Movies and Television	Won	
2019	The Hows of Us	Phenomenal Star of Philippine Cinema	Won	
2019	The Hows of Us	Golden Jury Award for Highest Grossing Film of All Time (with Daniel Padilla)	Won	
2020	Hello, Love, Goodbye	Phenomenal Box Office Star (with Alden Richards)	Won	
2020	Hello, Love, Goodbye	Golden Jury Award for Highest Grossing Film of All Time (with Alden Richards)	Won	
2020	Hello, Love, Goodbye	Film Actress of the Year	Won	
2023	A Very Good Girl	Box Office Queen	Won	
2024	Hello, Love, Again	Phenomenal Box-Office Queen	Won	

=== Gawad Urian Awards ===
Year	Notable Works	Category	Result	Ref.
2020	Hello, Love, Goodbye	Best Actress	Nominated	
2023	A Very Good Girl	Best Actress	Nominated	

=== Entertainment Editors' Choice Awards for Movies ===
Year	Notable Works	Category	Result	Ref.
2019	The Hows of Us	Best Actress	Won	
2024	A Very Good Girl	Box Office Heroes	Won	
2024	A Very Good Girl	Best Actress	Nominated	
2025	Hello, Love, Again	Box Office Heroes	Won	

=== FAP Luna Award ===
Year	Notable Works	Category	Result	Ref.
2020	Hello, Love, Goodbye	Best Actress	Nominated	
2024	A Very Good Girl	Best Actress	Nominated	

=== Anak TV Seal Awards ===
Year	Category	Result	Ref.
2013	Makabata Stars	Won	
2014	Makabata Stars	Won	
2015	Makabata Stars	Won	
2017	Makabata Stars	Won	
2018	Makabata Stars	Won	
2019	Makabata Stars	Won	
2023	Hall of Fame	Won	

=== Philippine Academy for Film and Television Arts ===
Year	Category	Notable Work	Result	Ref.
2026	Philippine Box Office Star	Hello, Love, Again	Won	

=== EdukCircle Awards ===
Year	Category	Result	Ref.
2014	Most Influential Teen Actress of the Year	Won	
2015	Most Influential Teen Actress	Won	
2016	Most Influential Celebrity Endorser of the Year	Won	
2016	Most Outstanding Young Actress in Television	Won	
2017	Most Influential Film Actresses of the Year	Won	
2017	Most Influential Female Endorsers of The Year	Won	
2018	Most Influential Celebrity Endorser of the Year	Won	
2019	Most Influential Celebrity Endorser of the Year	Won	
2019	Most Influential Film Actresses of the Year	Won	
2020	Ten Most Influential Celebrities of the Decade	Won	
2025	Most Influential Celebrity of the Year	Won	

=== Gawad Dangal Filipino Awards ===
Year	Notable Works	Category	Result	Ref.
2024	—N/a	Most Outstanding Love Team of the Year (with Alden Richards)	Won	

=== Paragon Critics Choice Awards ===
Year	Notable Works	Category	Result	Ref.
2020	Hello, Love, Goodbye	Best Actress	Won	-

=== Inding Indie Short Film Festival ===
Year	Notable Works	Category	Result	Ref.
2018	The Hows of Us	Excellence Award 2018 Best Actress	Won	

=== Metro Manila Film Festival ===
Year	Notable Works	Category	Result	Ref.
2013	Pagpag: Siyam na Buhay	Best Festival Actress	Nominated	

== Recognition from the Academe ==
=== Lyceum of the Philippines University – Cavite 2nd Laurus Nobilis Media Awards ===
Year	Category	Result	Ref.
2024	Outstanding Female Brand Endorser	Won	

=== Comguild Academe's Choice Awards ===
Year	Category	Result	Ref.
2019	Advertisers' Most Admired Love Team (with Daniel Padilla)	Won	

=== Aral Parangal Awards – Young Educators' Convergence of Soccksargen ===
Year	Category	Result	Ref.
2019	Movie Actress of the Year	Won	
2019	Loveteam of the Year with Daniel Padilla	Won	

=== Biliran Province State University BiPSU Media Awards ===
Year	Category	Result	Ref.
2019	Young Female Influencer of the Year	Won	

=== University of Perpetual Help System DALTA: Alta Media Icon Awards ===
Year	Notable Works	Category	Result	Ref.
2015	She's Dating the Gangster	Best Actress for Film	Won	
2017	Barcelona: A Love Untold	Best Actress	Won	
2019	The Hows of Us	Best Film Actress	Won	
2019	The Hows of Us	Best Love Team (with Daniel Padilla)	Won	
2019	The Hows of Us	Movie of the Year	Won	
2025	Hello, Love, Again	Best Actress for Film	Won	

=== Trinity University of Asia: Platinum Stallion Media Awards ===
Year	Notable Works	Category	Result	Ref.
2015	She's Dating the Gangster	Best Film Actress	Won	
2018	—N/a	Best Female TV Personality	Won	

=== Mindanao State University-General Santos City: Kabantugan Awards ===
Year	Category	Result	Ref.
2019	Most Favorite Movie Actress	Won	
2019	Most Favorite Love Team (with Daniel Padilla)	Won	

=== Gawad PASADO ===
Year	Notable Work	Category	Result	Ref.
2019	The Hows of Us	PinakaPASADOng Aktres	Nominated	
2024	A Very Good Girl	PinakaPASADOng Aktres	Won	

=== Northwest Samar State University: Choice Awards For Radio & Television ===
Year	Notable Works	Category	Result	Ref.
2018	La Luna Sangre	Best Actress in Primetime Teleserye	Won	

=== San Beda University: Gawad Bedista ===
Year	Notable Works	Category	Result	Ref.
2018	La Luna Sangre	Actress of the Year for TV	Won	

=== Golden Laurel LPU Batangas Media Awards ===
Year	Category	Result	Ref.
2019	Loveteam of the Year (with Daniel Padilla)	Nominated	
2022	Most Inspiring Social Media Personality	Won	

=== De La Salle Araneta University: Gawad Lasallianeta ===
Year	Notable Works	Category	Result	Ref.
2019	—N/a	Most Effective Celebrity Endorser	Nominated	
2019	—N/a	Most Outstanding Female TV Personality	Nominated	
2019	La Luna Sangre	Most Outstanding Female TV Actress	Nominated	
2020	—N/a	Most Effective Female Celebrity Endorser	Won	
2020	—N/a	Most Effective Twitter Influencer	Nominated	
2022	—N/a	Most Effective Female Celebrity Endorser	Won	
2022	—N/a	Most Influential Female Celebrity	Won	
2023	2 Good 2 Be True	Most Outstanding Actress in a Drama Series	Won	
2023	—N/a	Most Influential Female Filipino Celebrity	Won	
2023	—N/a	Most Outstanding Brand Endorser	Won	
2023	—N/a	Most Outstanding Social Media Personality	Nominated	
2023	—N/a	Most Outstanding Twitter Influencer	Nominated	
2024	A Very Good Girl	Most Outstanding Film Actress	Won	
2024	—N/a	Most Outstanding Brand Endorser	Won	
2024	—N/a	Most Outstanding Social Media Personality	Nominated	
2024	—N/a	Most Influential Filipino Celebrity	Nominated	
2024	—N/a	Most Outstanding X Influencer	Nominated	
2025	Hello, Love, Again	Most Outstanding Film Actress	Won	
2025	—N/a	Most Influential Celebrity	Won	
2026	—N/a	Most Influential Celebrity	Pending	
2026	—N/a	Most Outstanding Brand Endorser	Pending	

=== Guild of Educators, Mentors and Students – Hiyas ng Sining ===
Year	Notable Works	Category	Result	Ref.
2019	Hello, Love, Goodbye	Best Actress	Nominated	

== Music ==
=== Myx Music Awards ===
Year	Notable Works	Category	Result	Ref.
2014	"Nasa Iyo Na Ang Lahat"	Favorite Guest Appearance in a Music Video	Nominated	
2015	"Simpleng Tulad Mo"	Favorite Guest Appearance in a Music Video	Won	
2015	—N/a	Favorite New Artist	Nominated	
2016	"Mr. Dj"	Favorite Remake	Nominated	
2016	—N/a	Favorite MYX Celebrity VJ	Nominated	
2016	—N/a	Favorite Female Artist	Nominated	

== Popularity and Commerciality ==
=== Jeepney TV Fan Favorite Awards ===
Year	Notable Work	Category	Result	Ref.
2022	—N/a	Fave Lead Actress	Won	
2022	—N/a	All-time Favorite Love Team (with Daniel Padilla)	Won	
2022	Got to Believe	Fave Kapamilya Serye Iconic Line "Sorry po"	Won	
2022	Princess and I	Fave Love Triangle (KathNiel with Enrique Gil)	Won	

=== ASAP Pop Teen Choice Awards ===
Year	Category	Result	Ref.
2015	Pop Teen Sweetheart	Won	
2015	Pop Teen Social Media Star	Nominated	
2015	Pop Teen Fans Club (KathNiel)	Nominated	
2015	Pop Teen Love Team (with Daniel Padilla)	Nominated	
2016	Pop Teen Social Media Star	Nominated	
2016	Pop Teen Love Team (with Daniel Padilla)	Nominated	
2016	Pop Teen Fans Club (KathNiel)	Nominated	
2017	Pop Sweetheart	Nominated	
2017	Pop Social Media Star	Nominated	
2017	Pop Love Team (with Daniel Padilla)	Nominated	
2017	Pop Fans Club (KathNiel)	Nominated	

=== ASAP Pop Viewers Choice Awards ===
Year	Notable Works	Category	Result	Ref.
2011	Mara Clara as Mara	Teleserye Character (with Julia Montes)	Nominated	
2011	—N/a	Tween Popsies (with Daniel Padilla)	Nominated	
2012	—N/a	Pop Female Cutie	Nominated	
2012	—N/a	Pop Fans Club (Kathniel)	Won	
2012	—N/a	Tween Popsies (with Daniel Padilla)	Nominated	
2013	"Nasa Iyo Na Ang Lahat"	Pop Celebrity Cameo	Nominated	
2013	Must Be... Love	Pop Movie Love Team (with Daniel Padilla)	Nominated	
2013	Got to Believe "Chichay and Joaquin"	Pop Kapamilya TV Character (with Daniel Padilla)	Won	
2013	—N/a	Pop Cover Girl	Nominated	
2013	—N/a	Pop Fans Club (Kathniel)	Nominated	
2014	Simpleng Tulad Mo	Pop Celebrity Cameo	Nominated	
2014	She's Dating the Gangster	Pop Screen Kiss (with Daniel Padilla)	Nominated	
2014	—N/a	Pop Love Team (with Daniel Padilla)	Won	
2014	—N/a	Pop Female Fashionista	Nominated	
2014	—N/a	Pop Cover Girl	Won	
2014	—N/a	Pop Fans Club (KathNiel)	Nominated	
2014	Kathryn Bernardo on X	Pop Twittezen	Won	
2014	—N/a	Pop Selfie	Nominated	

=== Push Awards ===
Year	Category	Result	Ref.
2015	PushLike Most Favorite Group or Tandem (with Daniel Padilla)	Won	
2015	PushTweet Most Loved Female Celebrity	Won	
2015	PushTweet Most Loved Group or Tandem (with Daniel Padilla)	Won	
2015	PushGram Most Popular Female Celebrity	Won	
2015	PushGram Most Popular Group or Tandem (with Daniel Padilla)	Won	
2015	PushPlay Best Female Celebrity	Nominated	
2015	PushPlay Best Group or Tandem (with Daniel Padilla)	Won	
2015	Awesome Selfie Queen	Won	
2015	Push Elite Female Celebrity of the Year	Nominated	
2015	Push Elite Group or Tandem of the Year (with Daniel Padilla)	Won	
2016	PushLike Group or Tandem (with Daniel Padilla)	Won	
2016	PushTweet Female Celebrity	Won	
2016	PushTweet Group or Tandem (with Daniel Padilla)	Won	
2016	PushGram Female Celebrity	Won	
2016	PushGram Group or Tandem (with Daniel Padilla)	Won	
2016	PushPlay Best Group or Tandem (with Daniel Padilla)	Won	
2016	Push Elite Group or Tandem of the Year (with Daniel Padilla)	Won	
2017	VIVO Personality of the Year (with Daniel Padilla)	Won	
2017	Push Female Celebrity	Nominated	
2017	Push Female Movie Performance of the Year	Nominated	
2017	Push Group or Tandem (with Daniel Padilla)	Nominated	

=== Star Cinema Online Awards ===
Year	Notable Works	Category	Result	Ref.
2014	—N/a	Fan Favorite Wrecking Bowl	Nominated	
2014	She's Dating the Gangster	Favorite Female Movie Star	Nominated	
2015	—N/a	Favorite Social Media Celebs	Nominated	
2015	—N/a	Favorite TV Love Team (with Daniel Padilla)	Nominated	
2015	Crazy Beautiful You as Jackie	Favorite Female Movie Star	Won	
2015	Crazy Beautiful You as Jackie	Favorite Kilig Moment (when she and Kiko met on the bridge)	Won	
2015	Crazy Beautiful You as Jackie	Favorite Hugot Line “Huwag ka nang magpaasa na kaya mo akong mahalin kung di mo naman ako kayang panindigan.”	Won	
2015	—N/a	Favorite Female Youth Icon	Won	
2016	—N/a	Favorite Female Star or #HowToBeYouPo	Nominated	
2016	—N/a	Favorite Fitspiration or #Fitspiration Award	Nominated	
2016	—N/a	Favorite Social Media Personality or #FeedGoals	Nominated	
2016	—N/a	Favorite Fashion Icon or #360Awra Award	Won	
2016	—N/a	Favorite Love Team or #CoupleGoals (with Daniel Padilla)	Nominated	
2016	—N/a	Best Fandom or #SquadGoals Award (KathNiel)	Nominated	
2016	—N/a	Favorite Trending Sensation or #ViralRoyalty (with Daniel Padilla)	Nominated	
2016	Barcelona: A Love Untold as Mia	Favorite Movie Line or #PakGanern Award “Wag mo 'kong mahalin dahil mahal kita. Mahalin mo 'ko dahil mahal mo 'ko, because that is what I deserve.”	Won	
2017	—N/a	ReelxReal Fashion Icon	Nominated	
2017	Can't Help Falling in Love	Ultimate Female Movie Star	Won	
2017	Can't Help Falling in Love	Ultimate Movie of the Year (with Daniel Padilla)	Won	
2017	Can't Help Falling in Love as Gab	Favorite Movie Line “Love takes time. Even one second with the right person can feel like more than a lifetime”	Nominated	
2017	La Luna Sangre	Ultimate TV Series (with Daniel Padilla)	Nominated	
2017	—N/a	Ultimate Love Team (with Daniel Padilla)	Nominated	
2017	—N/a	Ultimate Fandom (KathNiel)	Nominated	
2017	—N/a	Favorite Love Out Loud (with Daniel Padilla)	Nominated	

=== Yahoo! Philippines OMG! Awards ===
Year	Category	Result	Ref.
2012	Most Promising Actress of the Year	Won	
2013	Breakthrough Actress of the Year	Won	
2013	Love Team of the Year (with Daniel Padilla)	Nominated	
2013	Fan Club of the Year (with Daniel Padilla)	Nominated	
2014	Celebrity of the Year	Nominated	
2014	Love Team of the Year (with Daniel Padilla)	Nominated	
2014	Fan Club of the Year (with Daniel Padilla)	Nominated	

== Accolades From Media ==
=== Manila Bulletin Newsmakers of the Year Awards ===
Year	Category	Result	Ref.
2025	Newsmaker of the Year	Won	

=== Philippine Daily Inquirer ===
Year	Category	Result	Ref.
2025	Women of Power	Won	

=== Mega Fashion Awards ===
Year	Category	Result	Ref.
2024	Best Mega Cover (April 2024)	Won	

=== Candy Readers Choice Awards ===
Year	Category	Result	Ref.
2014	Best Movie Actress	Won	
2014	Best Love Team (with Daniel Padilla)	Won	
2015	Favorite Actress	Won	
2015	Favorite Love Team (with Daniel Padilla)	Won	

=== Candy Style Awards ===
Year	Category	Result	Ref.
2012	Most Stylish BFF (with Julia Montes)	Won	
2013	Most Stylish Love Team (with Daniel Padilla)	Won	

=== Kakulay Teen Choice Awards ===
Year	Category	Result	Ref.
2012	Best Teen Drama Actress	Won	
2013	Best Teen Drama Actress	Won	
2013	Primetime Princess	Won	
2013	Popular Female Celebrity in Social Media	Won	
2014	Best Teen Drama Actress	Won	
2014	Primetime Princess	Won	
2014	Most Popular and Influential Celebrity in Social Media	Won	
2015	Most Beautiful Teen Star	Won	
2015	Primetime Princess	Won	
2015	Most Beautiful Filipina	Won	
2015	Sweetest Love Team (with Daniel Padilla)	Won	

=== PEP List PEPsters Choice & Editors’ Choice Awards ===
Year	Category	Result	Ref.
2013	Female Teen Star of the Year	1st Quarter	
2013	Female Teen Star of the Year	2nd Quarter	
2013	Female Teen Star of the Year	3rd Quarter	
2013	Female Teen Star of the Year	4th Quarter	
2013	Love Team of the Year (with Daniel Padilla)	4th Quarter	
2014	Female Teen Star of the Year	1st Quarter	
2014	Female Movie Star of the Year	Nominated	
2014	Celebrity Pair of the Year (with Daniel Padilla)	Nominated	
2014	Female Teen Star of the Year	Nominated	
2014	Female Fab of the Year	Nominated	
2016	Female Movie Star of the Year	Won	
2016	Female Teen Star of the Year	Won	
2016	Celebrity Pair of the Year (with Daniel Padilla)	Nominated	
2017	Celebrity Pair of the Year (with Daniel Padilla)	Nominated	

=== Rappler Social Media Awards ===
Year	Category	Result	Ref.
2014	Pinoy Celebrity of the Year (with Daniel Padilla)	Nominated	

=== LionhearTV ===
Year	Category	Result	Ref.
2016	Most Loved Female Artist	Won	
2017	Effortless Kilig Love Team (with Daniel Padilla)	Won	
2017	Female Summer Bod of 2017	Won	

=== RAWR Awards ===
Year	Notable Works	Category	Result	Ref.
2015	—N/a	Trending Love Team of the Year (with Daniel Padilla)	Won	
2015	—N/a	Female Celebrity of the Year	Won	
2015	—N/a	Fan Club of the Year (KathNiel)	Won	
2016	—N/a	Popular Love Team of the Year (with Daniel Padilla)	Nominated	
2016	—N/a	Fan Club of the Year (KathNiels)	Nominated	
2016	—N/a	Favorite Actress of the Year	Nominated	
2017	—N/a	Love Team of the Year (with Daniel Padilla)	Nominated	
2017	—N/a	Fan Club of the Year (with Daniel Padilla)	Won	
2017	—N/a	Actress of the Year	Nominated	
2017	—N/a	Ultimate Bida	Nominated	
2018	The Hows of Us)	Actress of the Year	Won	
2018	La Luna Sangre	Favorite Bida	Won	
2019	—N/a	Royal Lion Award	Won	
2019	—N/a	Royal Award: The Phenomenal Loveteam of Today's Generation (with Daniel Padilla)	Won	
2022	2 Good 2 Be True	Favorite Bida(with Daniel Padilla)	Nominated	

=== StarStudio Celebrity Style Awards ===
Year	Category	Result	Ref.
2013	Young Fashionista on the Rise	Won	
2013	Most Stylish Love Team (with Daniel Padilla)	Nominated	

=== FMTM Awards for TV Entertainment Section ===
Year	Notable Works	Category	Result	Ref.
2011	—N/a	On Screen Love Team of the Year (with Daniel Padilla)	Nominated	
2011	—N/a	Most Promising On Screen Couple (with Daniel Padilla)	Nominated	
2012	Princess and I	Most Promising Female Star	Won	
2012	Princess and I	TV Series Love Team of the Year (with Daniel Padilla)	Nominated	
2012	Princess and I	Most Popular TV Series Character	Nominated	
2012	—N/a	Best Breakthrough Performance by an Actress	Nominated	
2012	—N/a	Most Improved TV Actress of the Year	Nominated	
2012	—N/a	TV Actress of the Year	Nominated	
2012	—N/a	Hottest Trending Celebrity Couple (with Daniel Padilla)	Won	
2012	—N/a	TOP 5 Most Popular TV Actresses	Top 3	
2012	—N/a	TOP 5 Most Popular Love Teams (with Daniel Padilla)	Top 3	
2012	—N/a	Primetime Princess	Won	

=== Philippine Edition Network for Movie Awards ===
Year	Notable Works	Category	Result	Ref.
2013	24/7 in Love	Favorite Movie Actress: Romance Category	Nominated	
2013	24/7 in Love	Favorite Breakthrough Movie Actress	Nominated	
2013	Sisterakas	Favorite Movie Supporting Actress	Nominated	
2014	Pagpag: Siyam na Buhay	Favorite Movie Actress of 2013	Won	
2015	Crazy Beautiful You	Actress of the Year in a Romantic Movie	Won	

=== Philippine Edition Network for Television Awards ===
Year	Notable Works	Category	Result	Ref.
2014	Got to Believe	Favorite Primetime Drama TV Actress of 2013	Won	
2015	Pangako Sa 'Yo	Primetime Drama Actress	Nominated	

=== Inside Showbiz People's Choice Awards ===
Year	Category	Result	Ref.
2016	Love Team of the Year (with Daniel Padilla)	Nominated	
2016	Fandom of the Year (with Daniel Padilla)	Nominated	
2016	Favorite Inside Showbiz Cover	Won	
2016	Female Trending Star of the Year	Nominated	
2016	Favorite MEGA Cover	Nominated	
2019	Favorite TV Actress	Won	

=== VP Choice Awards ===
Year	Notable Works	Category	Result	Ref.
2019	Hello, Love, Goodbye	Movie Actress of the Year	Won	
2020	—N/a	TV Female Icon of the Decade	Won	
2023	2 Good 2 Be True	TV Actress of the Year	Won	
2024	A Very Good Girl	Movie Actress of the Year	Nominated	
2024	—N/a	Headliner of the Year	Won	
2025	Hello, Love, Again	Movie Actress of the Year	Nominated	

=== TAG Media Chicago ===
Year	Category	Result	Ref.
2023	Female Celebrity of the Year	Won	
2024	Female Celebrity of the Year	Won	

=== Zeen Fluential Award ===
Year	Category	Result	Ref.
2025	Zeenfluential Style Star	Won	

== Listicles ==
=== Preview Magazine ===
Year	Category	Result	Ref.
2022	50 Most Influential	Included	

=== Yes! Magazine ===
Year	Category	Result	Ref.
2011	100 Most Beautiful Stars	Included	
2012	Top 20 Most Influential Celebrity Netizen	Top 16	
2013	100 Most Beautiful Stars (with Julia Montes)	Top 1	
2014	100 Most Beautiful Stars	Included	
2015	100 Most Beautiful Stars	Included	
2016	100 Most Beautiful Stars	Included	
2017	100 Most Beautiful Stars (with Daniel Padilla)	Top 1	
2018	100 Most Beautiful Stars	Included	

=== Rogue Magazine ===
Year	Category	Result	Ref.
2015	50 Most Influential Filipinos Online	Included	

=== FHM Rankings ===
Year	Category	Result	Ref.
2015	100 Sexiest Women in the Philippines	# 17	
2016	100 Sexiest Women in the Philippines	# 16	
2017	100 Sexiest Women in the Philippines	# 16	

=== Metro Society ===
Year	Category	Result	Ref.
2018	Most Influential People on Social Media (Online Sensation)	Included	

== Awards from Events ==
=== Star Magic Ball Awards ===
Year	Category	Result	Ref.
2012	Breakout Style Award (with Daniel Padilla)	Won	
2013	Couple of the Night (with Daniel Padilla)	Won	
2015	Best Dressed Couple (with Daniel Padilla)	Won	
2017	Pond's Brightest Star of the Night	Won	

=== Star Magic Sportfest ===
Year	Category	Result	Ref.
2013	HAYAN Most Radiant Athlete	Won	
2015	Most Improved Player	Won	

=== Black Magic Halloween Party ===
Year	Notable Works	Category	Result	Ref.
2019	Herself as Poison Ivy	Best in Costume	Won	

=== Star Magical Christmas ===
Year	Notable Works	Category	Result	Ref.
2022	Nutcracker Group (w/ Daniel & group)	Best in Character	Won	

== Others ==
=== JCI Batangas Balisong 5th Gawad Balisong ===
Year	Category	Result	Ref.
2024	Outstanding Filipino Gamechangers of 2024 (Entertainment)	Won	

=== NBS Fan Favorites ===
Year	Notable Works	Category	Result	Ref.
2016	Everyday Kath	Fan Favorite Local Celebrity Book	Won	
2016	MEGA Magazine November 2016 Issue (KathNiel)	Fan Favorite Magazine	Won	
