= GMA Pictures =

Philippine film and television production company

GMA Network Films Inc.
- GMA Pictures logo (since 2019)
- Trade name: GMA Pictures
- Formerly: Cinemax Studios (1994–1998); GMA Films (1998–2019)
- Type: Subsidiary
- Industry: Film distribution; Film production; Television production
- Founded: June 22, 1994
- Founder: Jimmy Duavit; Butch Jimenez
- Headquarters: GMA Network Center, EDSA corner Timog Avenue, Diliman, Quezon City, Metro Manila, Philippines
- Area served: Worldwide
- Key people: Gilberto Duavit Jr. (chairman); Atty. Annette Gozon-Valdes (president); Nessa Valdellon (executive vice president); Jose Mari "Joey" Abacan (executive producer); Zig Dulay (resident director); Ricky Lee (consultant)
- Products: Home videos; Motion pictures; Music recordings; Post production services; Screenplays; Television series
- Parent: GMA Network Inc.
- Divisions: Backyard Productions
- Website: gmanetwork.com/films

GMA Network Films Inc., doing business as GMA Pictures (formerly Cinemax Studios and GMA Films), is a Philippine film, television production and distribution company based in Diliman, Quezon City. It is one of the largest film studios in the Philippines, along with Star Cinema, Viva Films and Regal Entertainment. Its notable films include Forever (1994), Ober Da Bakod: The Movie (1994), Bagong Bayani (1995), T.G.I.S. The Movie (1997), Sa Pusod ng Dagat (1998), José Rizal (1998), Muro-Ami (1999), Saranggola (1999), Deathrow (2000), Let the Love Begin (2005), Moments of Love (2006), I Will Always Love You (2006), Ouija (2007), The Promise (2007), Sundo (2009), Yaya & Angelina: The Spoiled Brat Movie (2009), The Road (2011), Imagine You and Me (2016), Firefly (2023), Hello, Love, Again (2024) and Green Bones (2024).

== History ==
=== Background ===
GMA Network entered film production through co-productions with Viva Films, including Ober Da Bakod: The Movie, Forever and Sana Dalawa ang Puso Ko.

=== 1995–2000: Early years ===
Cinemax Studios logo used from 1995 to 1998.

In 1995, GMA Network launched its own film outfit Cinemax Studios under the supervision of Jimmy Duavit and Butch Jimenez, with Run Barbi Run (1995) as its maiden movie. Later that year, Cinemax signed a co-production deal with OctoArts Films in which OctoArts would distribute the movies in theaters nationwide, while Cinemax (through its mother network, GMA) would handle publicity and promotions of the movies for TV and radio. GMA Network holds the airing rights for those movies. Films co-produced with other production companies are distributed by Cinemax.

In 1997, Cinemax began producing and distributing its own movies, beginning with Mga Bangka sa Tag-araw (later on known as Sa Pusod ng Dagat) and Indios (later on known as My Guardian Debil). At this time, it partnered with sister companies Film Experts and Optima Digital for production and post-production of its movies respectively.

In 1998, it changed its name to GMA Films after HBO's sister channel Cinemax entered the Southeast Asian market. Sa Pusod ng Dagat and José Rizal, both produced and directed by Marilou Diaz-Abaya. GMA Films also produced Muro-Ami and Deathrow, both which were entries at their respective MMFFs and also critically acclaimed.

On June 9, 1999, GMA Films locally distributed the anime film Voltes V: The Liberation, produced by Carlos Agustin.

In 2000, after the departure of Butch Jimenez from GMA Network, GMA Films was placed on hiatus. Deathrow was the last film produced.

=== 2004–2009: Comeback and Breakthrough ===
GMA Films returned to feature-film production with Let the Love Begin, which was released in February 2005.

In 2007, the award-winning film Ouija co-produced with Viva Films was supposed to be its first film to be released internationally. However, the scheduled overseas premieres in four U.S. cities (Las Vegas, San Francisco, Los Angeles, and San Diego) were cancelled. Only the one in New Jersey pushed through. The movie is titled Seance internationally.

In 2009, GMA Films co-produced the reboot of the classic komiks novel Ang Panday with Imus Productions. Starring Ramon "Bong" Revilla Jr. in the title role, it became the official entry of GMA Films and Imus Productions for the 2009 Metro Manila Film Festival. It became the festival's top grosser and won seven awards, including Best Picture and Best Actor for Revilla.

=== 2010–2012: Continued success ===
From then on, all films were only released nationwide while selected films had selected screenings in key points worldwide such as When I Met U, starring Richard Gutierrez and KC Concepcion had various international screenings and You to Me Are Everything, starring Marian Rivera and Dingdong Dantes had a New Jersey showing in 2010 and its recent film to be released at least within US borders was In Your Eyes, starring Claudine Barretto, Richard Gutierrez and Anne Curtis, had an international screening in notable cities such as Los Angeles and San Diego.

During the 2010 Metro Manila Film Festival, GMA Films' entry Si Agimat at si Enteng Kabisote became the top grosser. The film starred Vic Sotto and Ramon "Bong" Revilla Jr. and was a joint production with Imus Productions, M-Zet Production, Octo Arts Films and APT Entertainment.

GMA Films logo used from September 2011 to May 2014.

On May 11, 2012, The Road was released to theaters in the U.S. and Canada.

2012 is the year that GMA Films has produced eight films in a year, the most it has ever done since its very start. This was part of GMA Films' resolution to produce one film per month. Even though that did not happen, they managed to produce eight films. On the same year, It made their own first venture for television was Cielo de Angelina on the morning slot.

=== 2013–2014: Decline ===
In 2013, GMA Films released two feature films, Dance of the Steelbars and My Lady Boss. Both films performed less than its previous films last year despite a star-studded cast. GMA Films also distributed the Cinemalaya 2013 film Sana Dati in Philippine theaters.

In 2014, the film outfit produced the horror-thriller Basement, the action-thriller Overtime and the 40th Metro Manila Film Festival entry Kubot: The Aswang Chronicles 2, which won 5 major awards.

=== 2015–2016: AlDub phenomenon ===
With the popularity of the AlDub love team (Alden Richards and Maine Mendoza) rising to phenomenal heights in 2015, GMA Films partnered with Octo Arts Films, M-Zet Productions, APT Entertainment and MEDA Productions to produce My Bebe Love: #KiligPaMore as entry to the 41st Metro Manila Film Festival. The film starred Alden Richards and Maine Mendoza, alongside Vic Sotto and Ai-Ai delas Alas, and was directed by Jose Javier Reyes. The film became one of the highest-grossing films of the 41st MMFF, eventually earning 385 million pesos. The film won three awards at the MMFF, including Third Best Picture and Best Supporting Actress for Mendoza.

In 2016, GMA Films partnered with APT Entertainment and M-Zet Productions for the movie Imagine You and Me, which marked the second team-up of Alden Richards and Maine Mendoza. Shot mostly in Como and Verona in Italy, the movie was directed by Mike Tuviera. It was also one of the only two films (the other one is the film adaptation of Angels & Demons by Dan Brown) permitted to shoot in Verona.

Upon the movie's release on July 13, 2016, the film grossed over ₱12.8 million on the first six hours of opening day and it went on to gross over ₱21.5 million at the end of the day. It was 2016's highest opening gross for a Philippine film until it was surpassed by the Kathryn Bernardo and Daniel Padilla starrer Barcelona: A Love Untold, which grossed ₱23 million according to Star Cinema. Overall, Imagine You and Me was a big box office hit and had a successful four-week run in Philippine cinemas nationwide.

After Imagine You and Me, GMA Films took another hiatus as parent GMA Network focused on its migration to digital TV.

=== 2019: Brief Revival ===
After a 2-year hiatus, in 2019, GMA revived its film outfit as GMA Pictures. They also signed a co-production deal with Mic Test Entertainment, starting with Family History. It also co-produced the Cinemalaya 2019 entry Children of the River with Spears Films and Luna Studios.

GMA Pictures also created a new division called Backyard Productions, with Kiko en Lala as its first release.

=== 2022–present: Resurgence ===
On April 29, 2022, GMA Pictures signed a joint venture agreement with Viva Films.

In November 2022, GMA Pictures became active once again, in cooperation with GMA Public Affairs. Among its films released the following year were The Cheating Game and Firefly, which was one of the entries of the 49th Metro Manila Film Festival, in which it won as Best Picture.

On July 1, 2023, GMA Network appointed Nessa Valdellon as Senior Vice President for GMA Pictures. Valdellon later promoted as Executive Vice President for the film studio on April 1, 2024.

On August 7, 2024, GMA Pictures has successfully completed its digitally restored and remastered version of the 1998 movie José Rizal and was shown at Cinemalaya Festival 2024.

On May 19, 2024, Deadline Hollywood confirmed that GMA Pictures and ABS-CBN's film outfit, Star Cinema would collaborate on a film together with Kathryn Bernardo and Alden Richards reprising their respective roles as Joy and Ethan from the film Hello, Love, Goodbye. The film's sequel titled Hello, Love, Again was released on November 13, 2024 in the Philippines and has become the highest grossing Filipino film of all time. GMA Pictures and Columbia Pictures signed a distribution deal on September 5, 2024 to distribute Green Bones and KMJS' Gabi ng Lagim: The Movie under the latter studio's Sony Pictures Releasing International banner. The deal marks Columbia Pictures' return to distributing local films in the Philippines after an eight-year hiatus.

On June 16, 2025, GMA Network through GMA Pictures—signed a partnership agreement with Warner Bros Philippines to distribute the film P77 starring Barbie Forteza. The signing event was attended by executives from both GMA Network and Warner Bros.

Green Bones, an entry of the 2024 Metro Manila Film Festival, won the festival's Best Picture award, marking the first time that GMA Pictures achieved back-to-back wins for the award (following their win at the previous year's edition with Firefly) since both José Rizal and Muro-Ami did in 1998 and 1999 editions respectively.

GMA Pictures announced their first foray to adult animated feature films: Carl Joseph Papa's docudrama 58th about the Maguindanao massacre that took place in 2009, and Mervin Malonzo's dark fantasy Ella Arcangel: Awit ng Pangil at Kuko, based on a 2017 komik Ella Arcangel by Julius Villanueva.

== GMA Home Video ==
GMA Home Video
- Formerly: GMA Records Home Video (2003–2019)
- Type: Division
- Industry: Home entertainment
- Founded: 2003; 23 years ago
- Headquarters: GMA Network Center, EDSA corner Timog Avenue, Diliman, Quezon City, Metro Manila, Philippines
- Area served: Worldwide
- Key people: Gilberto Duavit Jr. (Chairman of GMA Pictures); Atty. Annette Gozon-Valdes (President of GMA Pictures)
- Products: Home video releases
- Services: Home videos; Digital distribution
- Owner: GMA Network Inc.
- Parent: GMA Pictures

GMA Home Video (formerly known as GMA Records Home Video) is the home video distribution arm of GMA Pictures. It is the exclusive home video and DVD distributor of films produced by GMA Pictures, as well as programs from GMA Network and films from select production companies. Nonetheless, some movies are released with GMA Films partners (most being Regal Entertainment or Viva Films).

== GMA Films on Television production ==
- Cielo de Angelina
- Love Is... (film)
- Fight for Love

== GMA Films Distribution ==
GMA Network's film distribution activities are managed by the GMA Films department, a subsidiary of the network. The department oversees the distribution of both domestic and international films, operating under the leadership of Joey Abacan, the Senior Vice President for Film Production and Programming at GMA Network. Abacan also serves as the executive producer for GMA Films (formerly known as GMA Pictures) together with Atty. Annette Valdes, the current President of GMA Films, and Ms. Nessa Valdellon, the Senior Vice President of GMA Films.

Under Abacan’s leadership, GMA Films has gained recognition for distributing a wide range of internationally acclaimed films, both for television and theater releases. Notable films distributed by GMA Films locally include Titanic, Voltes V: The Liberation, A Moment to Remember, Train to Busan, The Shutter (a Thai horror film), Pee Mak, 7 First Kisses, Uncharted, and Insidious: The Red Door. GMA Films has also collaborated with major studios such as Columbia Pictures' Sony Pictures Releasing International and Warner Bros. Pictures to distribute their films in territories outside the Philippines.

In 2024, GMA Network, headed by GMA Pictures' Atty. Annette Gozon, officially announced that GMA Network (GMA Pictures) will distribute Fernando Poe Jr.'s all-classic Filipino films. The long-term agreement is in partnership with FPJ Productions, headed by Senator Grace Poe.
