= List of highest-grossing Philippine films =

The following is a list of highest grossing Philippine films.

Color key

– is an entry film for Metro Manila Film Festival.

– is an entry film for Cinemalaya film festival.

== One billion mark ==
Year	Title	Production company	Box office	Source
2024	Hello, Love, Again	ABS-CBN Studios, Star Cinema, GMA Pictures	₱1.6 billion	

== Nine hundred million mark ==
Year	Title	Production company	Box office	Source
2023	Rewind	Star Cinema, APT Entertainment, AgostoDos Pictures	₱924 million (Note: The film earned a total of ₱1.2 billion in return of net profit for all expenses. Gross is the total amount of money a movie earns from ticket sales at the box office before any expenses are deducted, in this case, the movie earned ₱924 million in gross revenue. Returns usually refers to the net profit, which is the amount of money the movie makes after all expenses (like production, marketing, distribution, etc.) have been subtracted from the gross revenue. The ₱1.2 billion returns indicate that, after expenses, the movie made a net profit of ₱1.2 billion.)	

== Eight hundred million mark ==
Year	Title	Production company	Box office	Source
2019	Hello, Love, Goodbye	Star Cinema	₱880 million	
2018	The Hows of Us	Star Cinema	₱810 million	

== Five hundred million mark ==
Year	Title	Production company	Box office	Source:
2016	The Super Parental Guardians	Star Cinema	₱598 million	
2018	Fantastica	Star Cinema, Viva Films	₱596 million	
2014	Starting Over Again	Star Cinema	₱579 million	
2017	Gandarrapiddo: The Revenger Squad	Star Cinema, Viva Films	₱571 million	
2015	A Second Chance	Star Cinema	₱556 million	
2019	Miracle in Cell No. 7	Viva Films	₱543 million	
2015	Beauty and the Bestie	Star Cinema, Viva Films	₱529 million	

== Four hundred million mark ==
Year	Title	Production company	Box office	Source
2024	And the Breadwinner Is...	ABS-CBN Studios, Star Cinema, The IdeaFirst Company	₱460 million	
2014	The Amazing Praybeyt Benjamin	Star Cinema, Viva Films	₱456 million	
2024	Un/Happy for You	ABS-CBN Studios, Star Cinema, Viva Films	₱450 million	
2013	Girl, Boy, Bakla, Tomboy	Star Cinema, Viva Films	₱436 million	
2013	It Takes a Man and a Woman	Star Cinema, Viva Films	₱405 million	
2017	My Ex and Whys	Star Cinema	₱400 million	

== Three hundred million mark ==
Year	Title	Production company	Box office	Source
2012	Sisterakas	Star Cinema, Viva Films	₱393 million	
2025	Call Me Mother	Star Cinema, The IdeaFirst Company, Viva Films	₱392 million	
2015	My Bebe Love: KiligPaMore	GMA Pictures, APT Entertainment	₱385 million	
2018	Jack Em Popoy: The Puliscredibles	M-Zet Productions, APT Entertainment, CCM Film Productions	₱383 million	
2017	Ang Panday	Star Cinema, Viva Films, CCM Film Productions	₱379 million	
2013	My Little Bossings	OctoArts Films, M-Zet Productions, APT Entertainment, K Productions	₱375.9 million	
2019	Alone/Together	Black Sheep Productions, Project 8 Corner San Joaquin Projects	₱370 million	
2018	Exes Baggage	Black Sheep Productions	₱355.5 million	
2011	The Unkabogable Praybeyt Benjamin	Star Cinema, Viva Films	₱332 million	
2014	Bride for Rent	Star Cinema	₱326 million	
2019	The Mall, The Merrier	Star Cinema, Viva Films	₱322 million	
2016	Barcelona: A Love Untold	Star Cinema	₱321 million	
2017	Can't Help Falling in Love	Star Cinema	₱320 million	
2015	Crazy Beautiful You	Star Cinema	₱320 million	
2017	Kita Kita	Viva Films, Spring Films, Sharo Entertainment Productions	₱320 million	
2015	The Love Affair	Star Cinema	₱320 million	
2017	Finally Found Someone	Star Cinema, Viva Films	₱316.5 million	
2025	Meet, Greet & Bye	Star Cinema	₱305 million	
2026	The Loved One	Cornerstone Studios, Viva Films	₱300 million	
2012	The Mistress	Star Cinema	₱300 million	

== Two hundred million mark ==
Year	Title	Production company	Box office	Source
2014	She's Dating the Gangster	Star Cinema	₱296 million	
2011	No Other Woman	Star Cinema, Viva Films	₱278 million	
2011	Enteng Ng Ina Mo	Star Cinema, OctoArts Films, M-Zet Productions, APT Entertainment	₱272 million	
2017	Seven Sundays	Star Cinema	₱271 million	
2022	Deleter	Viva Films, Pelikula Red, Top Story	₱270 million	
2015	Heneral Luna	Artikulo Uno Productions	₱256 million	
2012	This Guy's in Love with U Mare!	Star Cinema, Viva Films	₱249 million	
2017	Unexpectedly Yours	Star Cinema	₱249 million	
2016	The Unmarried Wife	Star Cinema	₱246.3 million	
2014	Feng Shui 2	Star Cinema, K Productions	₱235 million	
2016	Just the 3 of Us	Star Cinema	₱230 million	
2015	Felix Manalo	Viva Films	₱226 million	
2023	Mallari	Mentorque Productions, Clever Minds Inc.	₱225 million	
2012	One More Try	Star Cinema	₱213 million	
2019	The Panti Sisters	Black Sheep Productions, ALV Films, The IdeaFirst Company, Quantum Films	₱213 million	
2010	Ang Tanging Ina Mo (Last na 'To!)	Star Cinema	₱210 million	
2019	Eerie	Star Cinema, PelikulaRed, Cre8 Productions, URSA Studios, Media East	₱210 million	
2015	You're My Boss	Star Cinema	₱210 million	
2009	You Changed My Life	Star Cinema, Viva Films	₱208.8 million	
2016	Everything About Her	Star Cinema	₱208 million	
2008	Ang Tanging Ina N'yong Lahat	Star Cinema	₱204 million	
2006	Sukob	Star Cinema	₱203 million	
2018	Kasal	Star Cinema	₱200 million	

== One hundred million mark ==
Year	Title	Production company	Box office	Source
2016	Imagine You and Me	GMA Pictures, APT Entertainment, M-Zet Productions	₱198 million	
2015	The Breakup Playlist	Star Cinema, Viva Films	₱188 million	
2006	Kasal, Kasali, Kasalo	Star Cinema	₱187 million	
2009	A Very Special Love	Star Cinema, Viva Films	₱185.2 million	
2013	Pagpag: Siyam na Buhay	Star Cinema, Regal Entertainment	₱182 million	
2015	Everyday, I Love You	Star Cinema	₱178 million	
2025	My Love Will Make You Disappear	Star Cinema	₱173 million	
2010	Si Agimat at si Enteng Kabisote	OctoArts Films, APT Entertainment, M-Zet Productions, Imus Productions, GMA Pictures	₱171 million	
2022	Partners in Crime	Star Cinema, Viva Films	₱168 million	
2000	Tanging Yaman	Star Cinema	₱167 million	
2000	Anak	Star Cinema	₱165.9 million	
2012	Unofficially Yours	Star Cinema	₱165 million	
2018	Sid & Aya: Not a Love Story	Viva Films, N² Productions	₱160 million	
2005	Enteng Kabisote 2: Okay Ka, Fairy Ko	OctoArts Films, M-Zet Productions	₱158 million	
2006	First Day High	Star Cinema	₱158 million	
2007	One More Chance	Star Cinema	₱152.7 million	
2012	Si Agimat, si Enteng Kabisote at si Ako	GMA Pictures	₱152 million	
2018	Ang Dalawang Mrs. Reyes	Star Cinema, The IdeaFirst Company, Quantum Films	₱150 million	
1991	Maging Sino Ka Man	Viva Films	₱150 million	
2007	Sakal, Sakali, Saklolo	Star Cinema	₱150 million	
2019	Unforgettable	Viva Films, The IdeaFirst Company	₱150 million	
2015	Ex with Benefits	Star Cinema, Viva Films	₱145 million	
2013	Four Sisters and a Wedding	Star Cinema	₱145 million	
2010	My Amnesia Girl	Star Cinema	₱144.8 million	
2006	Enteng Kabisote 3: Okay Ka, Fairy Ko	OctoArts Films, M-Zet Productions	₱144 million	
2010	Miss You Like Crazy	Star Cinema	₱143.25 million	
2014	Maybe This Time	Star Cinema, Viva Films	₱140.6 million	
2018	Miss Granny	Viva Films, N² Productions	₱140 million	
2025	Shake, Rattle & Roll Evil Origins	Regal Entertainment	₱140 million	
2014	My Big Bossing	OctoArts Films, M-Zet Productions, APT Entertainment	₱140 million	
2007	A Love Story	Star Cinema	₱139.6 million	
2008	Caregiver	Star Cinema	₱139 million	
2011	Segunda Mano	Star Cinema, AgostoDos Pictures, MJM Productions	₱138.7 million	
2009	In My Life	Star Cinema	₱137.4 million	
2013	She's the One	Star Cinema	₱137 million	
2003	Ang Tanging Ina	Star Cinema	₱136 million	
2018	My Perfect You	Star Cinema	₱136 million	
2004	Milan	Star Cinema	₱135.8 million	
2006	Don't Give Up on Us	Star Cinema	₱135 million	
2014	English Only, Please	Quantum Films, MJM Productions, Tuko Film Productions, Buchi Boy Films	₱135 million	
2008	For the First Time	Star Cinema	₱134.7 million	
2014	That Thing Called Tadhana	Cinema One Originals, Epicmedia, Monoxide Works, One Dash Zero Cinetools	₱134 million	
2024	Green Bones	GMA Pictures	₱133.7 million	
2012	Kimmy Dora and the Temple of Kiyeme	Star Cinema, Spring Films	₱133.4 million	
2011	Catch Me... I'm in Love	Star Cinema, Viva Films	₱130 million	
2015	Haunted Mansion	Regal Entertainment	₱128 million	
2006	Close To You	Star Cinema	₱127 million	
2010	Dalaw	Star Cinema, CineMedia, MJM Productions	₱125 million	
1998	Jose Rizal	GMA Pictures	₱125 million	
2016	Vince and Kath and James	Star Cinema	₱123 million	
2014	Da Possessed	Star Cinema, Regal Entertainment	₱122 million	
2007	Ouija	GMA Pictures, Viva Films	₱120.6 million	
2016	The Achy Breaky Hearts	Star Cinema	₱120 million	
2016	Camp Sawi	Viva Films, N² Productions	₱120 million	
2014	Diary ng Panget	Viva Films	₱120 million	
2009	I Love You, Goodbye	Star Cinema	₱120 million	
2014	Kubot: The Aswang Chronicles 2	GMA Pictures, Reality Entertainment	₱120 million	
2018	Goyo: Ang Batang Heneral	TBA Studios, Artikulo Uno Productions, Globe Studios	₱120 million	
2016	This Time	Viva Films	₱120 million	
2026	Pee Mak	Viva Films	₱120 million	
2008	Shake, Rattle & Roll X	Regal Entertainment, Regal Multimedia, Inc.	₱119 million	
2012	A Secret Affair	Viva Films	₱118.4 million	
2010	Here Comes the Bride	Star Cinema, OctoArts Films, Quantum Films	₱117 million	
2011	In the Name of Love	Star Cinema	₱117 million	
2008	Iskul Bukol 20 Years After	OctoArts Films, M-Zet Productions, APT Entertainment	₱116 million	
2010	Petrang Kabayo	Viva Films	₱115.4 million	
2005	D' Anothers	Star Cinema	₱115 million	
2005	Dubai	Star Cinema	₱115 million	
2019	Jowable	Viva Films, VinCentiments	₱115 million	
2003	Ngayong Nandito Ka	Star Cinema	₱115 million	
2004	Feng Shui	Star Cinema	₱114.2 million	
2006	You Are The One	Star Cinema	₱113.7 million	
2013	Must Be... Love	Star Cinema	₱113 million	
2002	Got 2 Believe	Star Cinema	₱112.2 million	
2017	Love You to the Stars and Back	Star Cinema	₱112 million	
2007	Ang Cute Ng Ina Mo	Star Cinema, Viva Films	₱110 million	
2026	Tayo sa Wakas	Star Cinema	₱110 million	
2016	Die Beautiful	Regal Entertainment, Octobertrain Films, The IdeaFirst Company	₱110 million	
2014	The Gifted	Viva Films, MVP Entertainment	₱110 million	
2016	The Third Party	Star Cinema	₱110 million	
2000	Tunay na Tunay: Gets Mo? Gets Ko!	Star Cinema, RCP Productions	₱108.1 million	
2009	Ang Panday	GMA Pictures	₱108 million	
2003	Till There Was You	Star Cinema	₱107.4 million	
2018	Aurora	Viva Films, Aliud Entertainment	₱107 million	
2008	My Best Friend's Girlfriend	GMA Pictures	₱107 million	
2005	Let the Love Begin	GMA Pictures	₱106 million	
2011	Ang Panday 2	GMA Pictures, Imus Productions	₱105.6 million	
2001	Pangako... Ikaw Lang	Viva Films	₱105.8 million	
2016	Always Be My Maybe	Star Cinema	₱105 million	
2019	Cuddle Weather	Regal Entertainment, Project 8 Corner San Joaquin Projects	₱105 million	
2000	Kahit Isang Saglit	Star Cinema	₱104.7 million	
2012	The Healing	Star Cinema	₱104.6 million	
1999	Isusumbong Kita sa Tatay Ko...	Star Cinema, FPJ Productions	₱104 million	
2008	I.T.A.L.Y.	GMA Pictures, Viva Films	₱103.7 million	
2018	Three Words To Forever	Star Cinema	₱103.5 million	
2015	Etiquette for Mistresses	Star Cinema	₱103.2 million	
2001	Bakit 'Di Totohanin	Star Cinema	₱102.7 million	
2014	Somebody to Love	Regal Entertainment	₱102.6 million	
2009	BFF: Best Friends Forever	Star Cinema	₱102.5 million	
2013	Bakit Hindi Ka Crush ng Crush Mo?	Star Cinema	₱102.3 million	
2010	You to Me Are Everything	Regal Entertainment, GMA Pictures	₱102 million	
2004	Enteng Kabisote: OK Ka Fairy Ko... The Legend	OctoArts Films, M-Zet Productions	₱101.6 million	
2008	One True Love	GMA Pictures	₱100.4 million	
2006	Till I Met You	GMA Pictures, Viva Films	₱100.4 million	
2015	#WalangForever	Quantum Films, Star Cinema	₱100 million	
2017	100 Tula Para Kay Stella	Viva Films	₱100 million	
2023	A Very Good Girl	Star Cinema	₱100 million	
2026	Always Yours, Never Mine	Star Cinema	₱100 million	
2005	Can This Be Love	Star Cinema	₱100 million	
2023	Five Breakups and a Romance	GMA Pictures, Cornerstone Studios, Myriad Entertainment	₱100 million	
2010	Paano na Kaya	Star Cinema	₱100 million	
2019	Just a Stranger	Viva Films	₱100 million	
2015	Just the Way You Are	Star Cinema	₱100 million	
2003	Kailangan Kita	Star Cinema	₱100 million	
2006	Moments of Love	GMA Pictures	₱100 million	
2016	Seklusyon	Reality Entertainment	₱100 million	
2009	Sundo	GMA Pictures	₱100 million	
2025	Quezon	TBA Studios	₱100 million	
2026	2 Valid IDs	Cinemalaya	₱100 million	

== See also ==
- List of highest-grossing films in the Philippines
