= Family History (2019 film) =

2019 family drama film by Michael V

- Official poster for Family History.
- Directed by: Michael V.
- Written by: Michael V.
- Produced by: Bang Uytiepo-Arespacochaga; Janine P. Nacar
- Starring: Michael V.; Dawn Zulueta
- Cinematography: Rommel Sales
- Edited by: Vanessa de Leon
- Music by: Archie Castillo
- Production companies: GMA Pictures; Mic Test Entertainment
- Distributed by: GMA Pictures
- Release date: July 24, 2019
- Running time: 125 minutes
- Country: Philippines
- Language: Filipino

Family History is a 2019 Philippine family psychological comedy-drama film written and directed by Michael V. in his directorial debut and also starred in the lead role. The film co-stars Dawn Zulueta, Miguel Tanfelix, and Bianca Umali, with the supporting cast include John Estrada, Ina Feleo, and Kakai Bautista.

A co-production of GMA Pictures and Mic Test Entertainment, the film was theatrically released on July 24, 2019.

== Cast and characters ==
- Michael V. as Alex Dela Cruz
- Dawn Zulueta as May B. Dela Cruz
- Miguel Tanfelix as Malix B. Dela Cruz
- Bianca Umali as Jenna Roque
- John Estrada as Jay Roque
- Kakai Bautista as Esmeralda "Dang" Asuncion
- Ina Feleo as Anna Roque
- Mikoy Morales as Marcus
- Jemwell Ventinilla as Pao
- Nikki Co as Rico
- Vince Gamad as Bogs
- Dingdong Dantes as Dr. Ronaldo D. Reyes
- Eugene Domingo as Liza De Guzman
- Nonie Buencamino as Ding
- Mcoy Fundales

== Release ==
The film released on July 24, 2019, in Philippine cinemas. It later on became available on Amazon Prime Video and Netflix.

== Reception ==
The film received positive reviews from critics for Michael V.'s directing and storyline.
