= Kakai Bautista =

Filipino actress, host, singer and comedienne

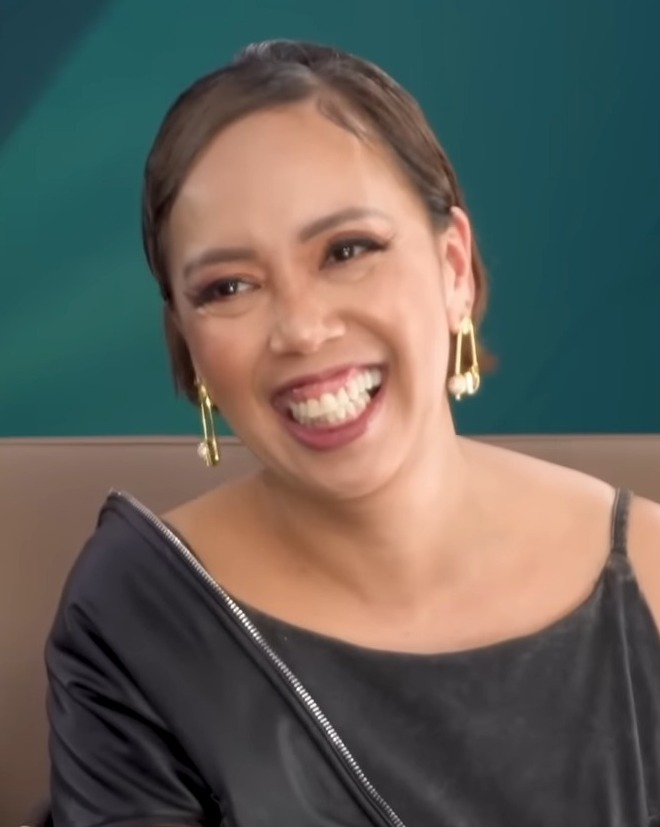
- Bautista in 2023
- Born: Catherine Herrera Bautista; September 2, 1978 (age 47); Aparri, Cagayan, Philippines
- Occupations: Actress; host; singer; comedienne
- Years active: 2002–present

Catherine "Kakai" Herrera Bautista (born September 2, 1978) is a Filipino actress, host, singer and comedienne.

== Career ==
Bautista first started out as a theater actress. She was discovered by Ricky Rivero in 2003 after her explosive appearance in the play, Alikabok. Rivero asked her to audition for a drama series directed by Lauri Dyogi titled Kay Tagal Kang Hinintay. She then started appearing on television shows and movies through supporting roles, but was recognized when she appeared as the villainous and evil Matilda in Kampanerang Kuba, Angelina in Kokey and most recently as Marj in the Filipino-Thai movie, Suddenly It's Magic. From 2010 to 2011, she did the horror-comedy sitcom, My Darling Aswang, in TV5 but stayed with ABS-CBN.

Bautista played Mercy in the Philippine Educational Theater Association's musical comedy Rak of Aegis, a role she had been playing since 2013.

== Filmography ==
=== Film ===
Year	Title	Role	Notes	Source
2002	Dekada '70	Rallyist		
2003	Pinay Pie	News Reporter	Credited as "Kakai Bautista".	
2004	All My Life	Crying Lady		
2006	Close to You	Inday		
2006	Kasal, Kasali, Kasalo	Myra	Credited as "Katherine 'Kakai' Bautista", 32nd Metro Manila Film Festival Official Entry	
2007	Sakal, Sakali, Saklolo	Myra	33rd Metro Manila Film Festival Official Entry	
2008	Scaregivers	Lawyer		
2009	And I Love You So	Teacher Lani		
2009	In My Life	Millet	Supporting role	
2010	Till My Heartaches End	Susan		
2011	My Valentine Girls	Maan	Segment: Soulmates	
2012	Suddenly It's Magic	Marj		
2013	Must Be... Love	Dolly		
2013	Kung Fu Divas	Samantha's original face	Cameo	
2015	Crazy Beautiful You	Madame Tweety		
2016	Always Be My Maybe	Esang		
2016	Imagine You and Me	Winona	Supporting role	
2016	Enteng Kabisote 10 and the Abangers	Ora/Oring	Supporting role	
2017	Loving in Tandem	Genina	Supporting role	
2017	Seven Sundays	Baby	Supporting role	
2017	The Ghost Bride	Jena	Supporting role	
2018	Harry & Patty	Patty		
2018	Wander Bra	Barbara		
2018	My Fairy Tail Love Story	Myrna	Supporting role	
2019	OFW: The Movie	Josie		
2019	Family History	Esmeralda "Dang" Asuncion		
2019	Hello, Love, Goodbye	Sally Daraga	Supporting role	
2019	#Jowable	Liberty Mangahas	Main role	
2020	Four Sisters Before the Wedding	Susiebeth "Bette" Sanchez	Supporting role	
2022	My Teacher	Ms. Love	48th Metro Manila Film Festival Official Entry	
2023	When I Met You in Tokyo	Sonia	49th Metro Manila Film Festival Official Entry	
2024	Hello, Love, Again	Sally Daraga	Special Participation	

=== Television ===
Year	Title	Role	Notes	Source
2003	Kay Tagal Kang Hinintay	Lilibeth dela Cruz		
2003	Sa Dulo ng Walang Hanggan	Palaboy		
2005	Kampanerang Kuba	Matilda Durano		
2006	Komiks Presents: Inday Bote	Sarah		
2006	Agawin Mo Man ang Lahat	Rita		
2007	Kokey	Angelina		
2007	Walang Kapalit	Angel		
2009	Komiks Presents: Dragonna	Ling		
2009	Precious Hearts Romances Presents: The Bud Brothers	Sheila		
2009	Tayong Dalawa	Ula		
2009–10	Nagsimula sa Puso	Missy		
2009–10	George and Cecil	Ellen		
2010	Your Song Presents: Love Me, Love You	Lukring		
2010	Hair Is Your Moment	Tanta		
2010	My Darling Aswang	Queenie		
2010	Precious Hearts Romances Presents: Impostor	Bettina		
2011	Pablo S. Gomez's Mutya	Lagring		
2011	Maynila	Ona	Episode: "Takot na Puso"	
2012	Toda Max	Yaya Avila		
2012	Lorenzo's Time	Kikay		
2013	Wansapanataym	Yaya	Episode: "Si Paolo, Apollo at si Polo"	
2014	Mars Ravelo's Dyesebel	Pinky Pusit	Voice only	
2015	Your Face Sounds Familiar (season 2)	Herself	Contestant, Season 2	
2016	Conan, My Beautician	Chika la Chaka	Main Role	
2017–18	Wowowin	Herself	Guest co-host	
2017	Dear Uge	Shine	Episode: "NPBSB: No Poging Boyfriend Since Birth"	
2018	Ipaglaban Mo!	Tonya	Episode: "Umasa"	
2019	Dear Uge	Mila	Episode: "This Yaya Is Mine"	
2019	Daddy's Gurl	Tootsie	Guest role	
2020–21; 2023	All-Out Sundays	Herself	Various roles/Performer	
2021	Catch Me Out Philippines	Herself	Judge	
2021	First Yaya	Pepita San Jose		
2022	First Lady	Pepita San Jose		
2022	Oh My Korona	Marga		
2023	Can’t Buy Me Love	Yaya Ikay		
2023	Open 24/7	Mona		

=== Theater ===
Year	Title	Role	Notes	Source
2002	Alikabok	Rosita	Music Museum	
2013–present	Rak of Aegis	Mercy	Philippine Educational Theater Association (PETA) Theater	
