= Kathryn (album) =

Studio album by Kathryn Bernardo
- Released: November 26, 2014
- Recorded: May–August 2014
- Genres: Teen pop; contemporary
- Length: 1:06:59
- Languages: English, Filipino
- Label: Star Records
- Producer: Rox B. Santos

Singles from Kathryn
- 1. "Pinasmile (with Daniel Padilla)" Released: April 4, 2014; 2. "Ikaw Na Nga Yata" Released: June 30, 2014; 3. "You Don't Know Me" Released: November 6, 2014

Kathryn is the debut studio album by Filipina actress Kathryn Bernardo, released in the Philippines on November 26, 2014, by Star Records. It contains eleven tracks including four covers and six original songs.

== Background and development ==
At the beginning of 2014, Bernardo has been given a number of singing projects such as guesting in Daniel Padilla's concert "DOS" and providing the Summer Station ID theme song "Pinasmile" with Padilla for ABS-CBN.

On May 17, 2014, Bernardo posted a picture on her Instagram account of herself with Star Music executive Jonathan Manalo in a recording studio. According to sources, the said picture was taken during the first day of recording for her upcoming debut album.

On August 22, late night news program Bandila aired a segment featuring Bernardo's recording sessions and gave snippets of the songs featured in her debut album such as cover versions of "Mr. DJ"(originally by Sharon Cuneta), "Love Has Come My Way"(originally by Heart Evangelista) and an original song titled "K Thx Bye".

On November 6, Bernardo shared in an interview that she had finished recording the album in August and that it will contain six songs along with a number of bonus tracks. However, on November 29, she revealed that it will now contain eleven tracks including five original songs.

== Composition ==
Bernardo talked about the overall sound of the album with the Philippine Star, saying "The themes are varied. When you listen to the songs, what you’ll notice is they are easy listening[...] I think (the music is) very young, very sweet, very relaxing. Pwede siyang pang-chill-out (You can chill out with it). I hope teenagers would like it and they can sing along with the songs (wherever they are)."

The album includes five original songs. "Na Sa ’Yo Din Pala" is written as a response to Daniel Padilla's signature song "Na Sa ’Yo Na Ang Lahat" and were both composed by Jungee Marcelo. Bernardo states that she and Padilla would listen to the music of Michael Bublé and their favorite love song is "Grow Old With You". "You Don't Know Me" was written by singer-songwriter and Star Records artist Marion Aunor. It is about a blooming relationship that fails to take off because of the lack of effort of one of those involved to genuinely get to know the other. In an interview with Philippine Entertainment Portal, she revealed that her label's head Roxy Liquigan asked her to contribute an original composition to the album after her own composition titled "Do Do Do" received a warm reception from Bernardo's fans after it was featured on her 18th Birthday TV special. After listening to some of the songs that she wrote for her upcoming album, the label selected "You Don't Know Me". Aunor also revealed how Bernardo expressed her gratitude by asking her the story behind the song.

It also includes two bonus tracks, "Pinasmile", the ABS-CBN Summer Station ID for 2014, and a cover of "Got To Believe in Magic" which she recorded with Padilla as the theme song for their TV drama series Got to Believe that aired on 2013.

== Singles ==
- "Pinasmile" is a duet with Padilla and was released on April 4, 2014. A music video for the song premiered on March 25 and was used as ABS-CBN's Summer Station ID for 2014.
- "Ikaw Na Nga Yata" is the lead single from the album and premiered on July 29 at MOR 101.9, ABS-CBN's official FM radio station. It serves as Bernardo's debut single as a solo artist and was also used as the theme song for the Philippine dubbed version of Korean drama "Bel Ami".
- "You Don't Know Me" is the second single from the album and premiered on November 6. A lyric video featuring Bernardo singing the song in the studio was uploaded on Star Records' YouTube channel on the same day. It was written by singer-songwriter Marion Aunor. The official music video premiered on December 24.

== Commercial performance ==
On the first day of its commercial release, the album was certified gold for selling more than 7,500 copies nationwide.

== Track listing ==
No.	Title	Writer(s)	Length
1.	"Mr. DJ"	Rey Valera	03:16
2.	"You Don't Know Me"	Marion Aunor	03:35
3.	"Love Has Come My Way"	Leonardo Quinitio	02:58
4.	"Temporary Déjà Vu"	Edmund Perlas & Jojo Burgos	04:02
5.	"Crush Ng Bayan"	Vehnee Saturno	02:53
6.	"Na Sa ’Yo Din Pala"	Jungee Marcelo	03:43
7.	"Ikaw Na Nga Yata"	Vehnee Saturno, Christine Estabillo & Rox Santos	03:18
8.	"K Tnx Bye"		02:45
9.	"Pagdating Ng Panahon"	Edith Gallardo & Moy Ortiz	04:47
10.	"Got To Believe in Magic" (duet with Daniel Padilla)	David Pomeranz	04:17
11.	"Pinasmile" (duet with Daniel Padilla)	Jumbo De Belen & Thyro Alfaro	04:56
12.	"Mr. DJ (Minus One)"	Rey Valera	03:16
13.	"You Don't Know Me (Minus One)"	Marion Aunor	03:35
14.	"Love Has Come My Way (Minus One)"	Leonardo Quinitio	02:58
15.	"Temporary Déjà Vu (Minus One)"	Edmund Perlas & Jojo Burgos	04:02
16.	"Crush Ng Bayan (Minus One)"	Vehnee Saturno	02:53
17.	"Na Sa ’Yo Din Pala (Minus One)"	Jungee Marcelo	03:43
18.	"Ikaw Na Nga Yata (Minus One)"	Vehnee Saturno, Christine Estabillo & Rox Santos	03:18
19.	"K Tnx Bye (Minus One)"		02:43
