= Hello, Love, Again =

2024 Philippine romantic drama film

- Theatrical release poster
- Directed by: Cathy Garcia-Sampana
- Screenplay by: Carmi G. Raymundo; Crystal Hazel San Miguel
- Story by: Carmi G. Raymundo; Crystal Hazel San Miguel; Olivia M. Lamasan
- Produced by: Katherine S. Labayen
- Starring: Kathryn Bernardo; Alden Richards
- Cinematography: Noel Teehankee
- Edited by: Marya Ignacio
- Music by: Jessie Lasaten
- Production companies: ABS-CBN Film Productions, Inc.; ABS-CBN Studios; GMA Pictures
- Distributed by: Star Cinema
- Release date: November 13, 2024
- Running time: 122 minutes
- Country: Philippines
- Language: Filipino
- Box office: ₱1.6 billion

Hello, Love, Again is a 2024 Philippine romantic drama film directed by Cathy Garcia-Sampana from a script by Carmi G. Raymundo and Crystal Hazel San Miguel; filmmaker Olivia Lamasan are credited among the story writers. The sequel to Hello, Love, Goodbye (2019), it stars Kathryn Bernardo and Alden Richards, alongside Joross Gamboa, Valerie Concepcion, and Jennica Garcia. In the film, Joy and Ethan reunite in Canada after discovering that their opportunities have changed.

The first major co-production by Star Cinema and GMA Pictures, two film studios from rival media companies, the film was theatrically released in the Philippines on November 13, 2024. The film is commercially successful and received positive reviews from critics, earning ₱1.6 billion in box office and becoming the highest-grossing Filipino film of all time.

== Plot ==
In the spring of 2020, Ethan visits Joy, who is now working as a domestic helper in Calgary. He proposes to her, but soon finds himself stranded due to the COVID-19 lockdown. Forced to move in with Joy, their relationship begins to unravel as Ethan struggles with menial jobs while his bar in Hong Kong goes bankrupt in his absence. A year later, Ethan learns his father, Mario, has contracted COVID-19. He rushes back to Hong Kong, but arrives too late to see Mario, who dies just before his arrival. Distraught and alone, Ethan has a one-night stand with a stranger, only to be caught when Joy video-calls to tell him of her imminent return. Heartbroken, Joy ends their engagement and nearly attempts suicide.

Three years later, Joy is working at a nursing care facility and applying to move to the United States to become a registered nurse. While picking up a friend at the airport, she unexpectedly runs into Ethan and their mutual friend Jhim, who are both looking for work in Canada. At a café, Jhim asks Joy for job recommendations, and she asks him for his contact number— unaware that he provides Ethan's number instead. Joy soon finds herself in awkward encounters with Ethan, leading her to believe he is pursuing her, though he denies it. At a picnic, Joy becomes jealous when a colleague, Baby, develops a crush on Ethan. In an attempt to keep him close, Joy proposes they live together as common-law partners for a year, a suggestion Ethan agrees to.

News of Joy and Ethan's renewed relationship excites their friends and family both back home and in Hong Kong, unaware of their charade. However, Joy's feelings begin to shift when Ethan volunteers to help clean at the nursing home, and Jhim reveals that Ethan narrowly survived an attack by loan sharks over his bar debts, even selling his house to pay them off. As Joy and Ethan start to reconcile, a jealous Baby invites Ethan for a chat in front of Joy. That night, when Ethan returns, Joy accuses him of cheating, but Ethan explains that Baby had threatened to report them to the IRCC for fraud. In an effort to protect Joy's future, Ethan ends their relationship. Apologizing for his past mistakes, Ethan opens up, and Joy confesses her true feelings. They make love, marking a new beginning for them.

The following day, Joy arrives at work to learn that her patient, Martha, died the night before from dementia complications. When she returns home, Joy discovers that her application to the U.S. has been accepted, much to Ethan's surprise and sorrow. Joy apologizes to Ethan, who accepts his fate but hopes that this will be the last time he has to say goodbye to her. On her way to the airport, Joy reads a letter Martha left behind, in which she expresses regret for neglecting her loved ones and urges Joy to "return home." Torn, Joy cancels her departure and rushes to Ethan's house. As she knocks on the door, Ethan emerges from the yard, and the two share a heartfelt declaration of love, leading to their marriage a year later.

== Cast ==
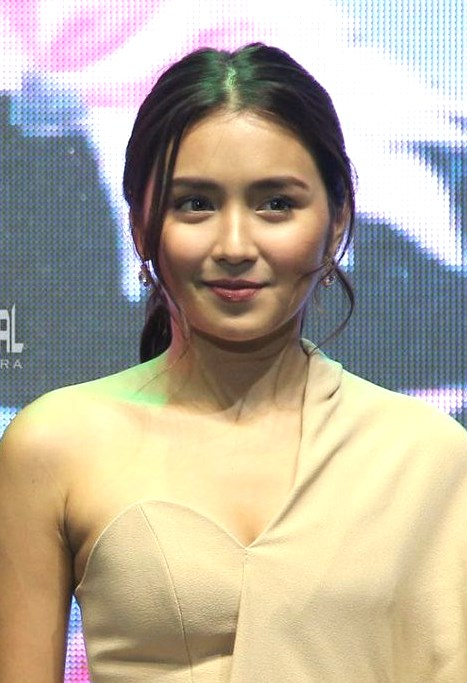
Kathryn Bernardo portrays as Joy

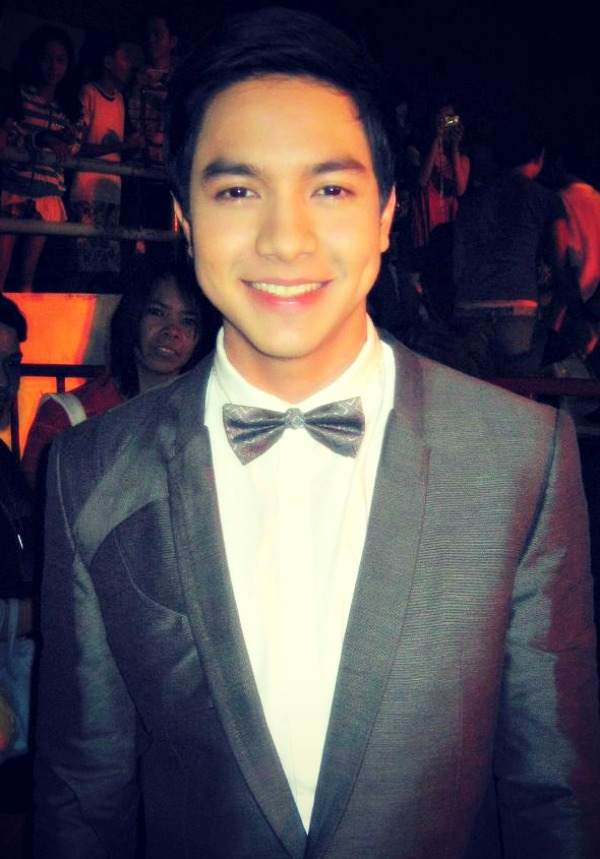
Alden Richards portrays as Ethan

- Kathryn Bernardo as Joy Marie Fabregas-del Rosario
- Alden Richards as Ethan del Rosario
- Joross Gamboa as Jhim Gabriel
- Valerie Concepcion as Jambi
- Jennica Garcia as Baby
- Ruby Rodriguez as Amy
- Jobert Austria as Tito Lino
- Mark Labella as Marc
- Marvin Aritrangco as Marvin
- Wendy Froberg as Martha
- Kevin Kreider as Uno
- Jeffrey Tam as Carlo Nicolas
- Lito Pimentel as Mario del Rosario, Ethan's father
- Jameson Blake as Edward del Rosario, Ethan's younger brother
- Kakai Bautista as Sally Daraga
- Lovely Abella as Gina Mariquit
- Maymay Entrata as Mary Dale Fabregas, Joy's cousin
- Anthony Jennings as Eric del Rosario, Ethan's younger brother
- Wilbert Ross as Joey Fabregas, Joy's younger brother
- William Lorenzo as Celso Fabregas, Joy and Joey's father
- Eric Jhon Balajadia as Tonton

== Production ==
=== Development ===
During the theatrical release of Hello, Love, Goodbye, lead actor Alden Richards and director Cathy Garcia-Molina (now Cathy Garcia-Sampana) expressed openness to working on a sequel for the film despite the latter's confirming plans to retire from directing to focus on her family, with lead actress Kathryn Bernardo expressing similar sentiments on a potential sequel.

On May 19, 2024, American news website Deadline confirmed that film studios Star Cinema and GMA Pictures will be collaborating together for the first time in developing the film, with Bernardo and Richards reprising their respective roles as Joy and Ethan. Garcia-Sampana was hired to direct the film's sequel, and is targeting for a November 13, 2024 release in the Philippines.

The film's sequel centers on Filipinos in Canada. Screenwriters Carmi Raymundo and Crystal San Miguel narrate Bernardo and Richards' blooming romance amid their hardships and challenges as OFWs. On May 19, 2024, ABS-CBN and GMA executives held a joint press conference of the upcoming film, showing the start of the movie collaboration between the two media companies.

=== Filming ===
In June, Joross Gamboa, who was cast in the prequel movie Hello, Love, Goodbye, shared photos and videos in social media with fellow actors Alden Richards and Jeffrey Tam in Hong Kong for the shooting, while the production and the rest of the cast moved and finished the shooting in Canada from July to August 2024.

Principal photography commenced on July 26, 2024, in Calgary, Canada. Filming wrapped in up on August 24, 2024.

== Marketing ==
On September 25, 2024, Star Cinema through its social media platforms, shared the movie's first teaser which garnered more than 10 million views in the first six hours after its release.

On October 5, 2024, Star Cinema held a mall show at Ayala Malls Solenad in Laguna as part of its Hello Again Tour. The film's official poster was also revealed at the event. The movie had its release date revealed as November 13, 2024.

During their second mall show for the Hello Again Tour held on October 8, 2024, at Vista Malls Taguig, the film's official trailer was first released. The trailer had more than 11 million views in 14 hours after its release across social media.

== Release ==
Hello, Love, Again debuted in 656 cinemas nationwide on November 13, 2024, setting a new record for the widest release of a Filipino film. Midnight screenings were also held in various cinemas across the country. A day before its general release, a red carpet world premiere was held at SM Megamall and was attended by the film's cast and crew members including the lead stars Kathryn Bernardo and Alden Richards, and director Cathy Garcia-Sampana. The event was also attended by the celebrities and executives of ABS-CBN and GMA including Atty. Annette Gozon-Valdes, Carlo L. Katigbak, Mark Lopez, Cory Vidanes, Jak Roberto, Barbie Forteza, and Julia Montes.

After the successful first-day run, Star Cinema released the film in 1,100 cinemas worldwide, a first for any Filipino film.

The film premiered at the Manila International Film Festival (MIFF) in Los Angeles on January 30, 2025. It was also released on Netflix on February 13, 2025. The film debut at number 1 on Netflix Philippines and number 6 in non-English movies globally.

In August 2025, the film was announced by the Film Development Council of the Philippines as a contender for the Philippines' official entry to the Best International Feature Film category of the Academy Awards in 2026. It lost to Magellan in September 2025.

== Reception ==
=== Box office ===
Hello, Love, Again earned ₱85 million on its first day, setting the record for the highest opening day gross for a local film and surpassing The Super Parental Guardians (2016). On its second day, the film earned an additional ₱70 million in box office receipts, making it the fastest local film ever to surpass the ₱150 million mark, and by its third day, the film had earned ₱245 million, the fastest local film to surpass the ₱200 million mark.

The movie also set the record for the largest opening weekend ever for a Filipino film in the United States and Canada, earning a total of US$2.4 million and finishing in eighth place. As of November 17, the film earned ₱520 million in the domestic box office. As of November 18, 2024, the film earned ₱566 million in the Philippines. Both Bernardo and Richards announced that part of the film's proceeds would be donated to victims of typhoons that struck the Philippines at the time of its release. On November 23, 2024, the film earned ₱1.06 billion, making it the first Filipino movie to gross over a billion pesos. As of December 2, 2024, the film has earned ₱1.4 billion pesos. By February 25, 2025, Star Cinema released the film's total worldwide gross of ₱1.6 billion pesos. It has also become the highest grossing Filipino film of all time, surpassing Rewind. The film ranked 97th at the 2024 worldwide box office, according to Box Office Mojo, with a reported total gross of $22,881,613 (box office from Europe and other countries in Asia were excluded).

=== Critical reception ===
The film received a review score of 71/100 from 6 reviews according to review aggregator website Kritikultura, indicating a generally positive reception.

Vikram Murthi of IndieWire gave Hello, Love, Again a mixed review, grading it a "B-". He stated that in spite of its earnestness, "the film exhibits something of a split personality by awkwardly moving between cutesy soap operatic romance and an unsparing, oft-devastating portrait of the myriad hurdles facing foreign workers.... [Bernardo and Richards'] scenes together can feel unfocused solely because they're needlessly drawn out. Plus, the various plot complications that hinder their inevitable reconciliation, like a half-forgotten love triangle or Joy's impulsive decision to accept Ethan as a common-law partner, generally feel like caricatured dramatic obstacles."

Jason Tan Liwag, writing for Rappler, praised the film's acting, editing, and cinematography while criticizing its portrayal of the Filipino community in Calgary as "underdeveloped".

== Awards and Recognitions ==
Accolades received by Hello, Love, Goodbye
Awards	Date of ceremony	Category	Recipient(s)	Result	Ref.
10th Asian World Film Festival	November 13-21, 2024	Snow Leopard Rising Star Award	Kathryn Bernardo	Won	
Cinema Exhibitors' Association of the Philippines (CEAP)	May 6, 2025	Top Grossing Movie of 2024	Hello, Love, Again	Won	
Cinema Exhibitors' Association of the Philippines (CEAP)	May 6, 2025	Box Office Queen	Kathryn Bernardo	Won	
Cinema Exhibitors' Association of the Philippines (CEAP)	May 6, 2025	Box Office King	Alden Richards	Won	
7th Gawad Lasallianeta Awards	December 10, 2024	Most Outstanding Film Actress	Kathryn Bernardo	Won	
7th Gawad Lasallianeta Awards	December 10, 2024	Most Outstanding Film Actor	Alden Richards	Won	
7th Gawad Lasallianeta Awards	December 10, 2024	Most Outstanding Filipino Film	Hello, Love, Again	Won	
Manila International Film Festival	March 7, 2025	Worldwide Box Office Hit Award	Hello, Love, Again	Won	
GMMSF Box-Office Entertainment Awards	June 28, 2025	Phenomenal Box-Office King of Philippine Cinema	Alden Richards	Won	
GMMSF Box-Office Entertainment Awards	June 28, 2025	Phenomenal Box-Office Queen of Philippine Cinema	Kathryn Bernardo	Won	
GMMSF Box-Office Entertainment Awards	June 28, 2025	Most Popular Screenwriter	Carmi Raymundo, Crystal Hazel San Miguel, Olivia Lamasan	Won	
GMMSF Box-Office Entertainment Awards	June 28, 2025	Most Popular Film Director	Cathy Garcia-Sampana	Won	
GMMSF Box-Office Entertainment Awards	June 28, 2025	Best Ensemble Acting for Movies	Hello, Love, Again	Won	
8th Entertainment Editors' Choice Awards (The Eddy's)	July 20, 2025	Box Office Hero	Kathryn Bernardo	Won	
8th Entertainment Editors' Choice Awards (The Eddy's)	July 20, 2025	Box Office Hero	Alden Richards	Won	
8th Entertainment Editors' Choice Awards (The Eddy's)	July 20, 2025	Best Actor	Alden Richards	Nominated	
8th Entertainment Editors' Choice Awards (The Eddy's)	July 20, 2025	Best Supporting Actor	Joross Gamboa	Nominated	
8th Entertainment Editors' Choice Awards (The Eddy's)	July 20, 2025	Best Director	Cathy Garcia-Sampana	Nominated	
8th Entertainment Editors' Choice Awards (The Eddy's)	July 20, 2025	Best Screenplay	Carmi Raymundo, Crystal Hazel San Miguel, Olivia Lamasan	Nominated	
8th Entertainment Editors' Choice Awards (The Eddy's)	July 20, 2025	Best Production Design	Norico Santos	Nominated	
8th Entertainment Editors' Choice Awards (The Eddy's)	July 20, 2025	Best Editing	Marya Ignacio	Nominated	
8th Entertainment Editors' Choice Awards (The Eddy's)	July 20, 2025	Best Musical Score	Jessie Lasaten	Nominated	
8th Entertainment Editors' Choice Awards (The Eddy's)	July 20, 2025	Best Picture	Hello, Love, Again	Nominated	
73rd FAMAS Award	August 22, 2025	Bida sa Takilya Actress	Kathryn Bernardo	Won	
73rd FAMAS Award	August 22, 2025	Best Actress	Kathryn Bernardo	Nominated	
73rd FAMAS Award	August 22, 2025	Best Actor	Alden Richards	Nominated	
73rd FAMAS Award	August 22, 2025	Bida sa Takilya Actor	Alden Richards	Won	
73rd FAMAS Award	August 22, 2025	Best Production Design	Norico Santos	Nominated	
73rd FAMAS Award	August 22, 2025	Best Editing	Marya Ignacio	Nominated	
73rd FAMAS Award	August 22, 2025	Best Musical Score	Jessie Lasaten	Nominated	
ContentAsia Awards	September 4, 2025	Best Movie or Telemovie Made in Asia	Hello, Love, Again	Won	
ContentAsia Awards	September 4, 2025	Best Original Song created in Asia for an Asian TV Series/Program or Movie	Palagi by TJ Monterde and KZ Tandingan	Nominated	
6th Alta Media Icon Awards	October 21, 2025	Movie of the Year	Hello, Love, Again	Won	
6th Alta Media Icon Awards	October 21, 2025	Best Actor for Film	Alden Richards	Won	
6th Alta Media Icon Awards	October 21, 2025	Best Actress for Film	Kathryn Bernardo	Won	
27th Gawad Pasado	October 25, 2025	Pinakapasadong Aktres	Kathryn Bernardo	Nominated	
27th Gawad Pasado	October 25, 2025	Pinakapasadong Aktor	Alden Richards	Nominated	
27th Gawad Pasado	October 25, 2025	Pinakapasadong Direktor	Cathy Garcia Sampana	Nominated	
27th Gawad Pasado	October 25, 2025	Pinakapasadong Istorya	Carmina Raymundo, Crystal Hazel San Miguel, Olivia Lamasan	Nominated	
27th Gawad Pasado	October 25, 2025	Pinakapasadong Dulang Pampelikula	Carmina Raymundo, Crystal Hazel San Miguel, Olivia Lamasan	Nominated	
27th Gawad Pasado	October 25, 2025	Pinakapasadong Disenyo Pamproduksyon	Norico D. Santos	Nominated	
27th Gawad Pasado	October 25, 2025	Pinakapasadong Sinematographiya	Noel Teehanke	Nominated	
27th Gawad Pasado	October 25, 2025	Pinakapasadong Editing	Marya Ignacio	Nominated	
27th Gawad Pasado	October 25, 2025	Pinakapasadong Musika	Jessie Lasaten	Won	
27th Gawad Pasado	October 25, 2025	Pinakapasadong Pelikula	Hello, Love, Again	Nominated	
41st PMPC Star Awards for Movies	November 30, 2025	Movie of the Year	Hello, Love, Again	Nominated	
41st PMPC Star Awards for Movies	November 30, 2025	Movie Director of the Year	Cathy Garcia-Sampana	Nominated	
41st PMPC Star Awards for Movies	November 30, 2025	Movie Actor of the Year	Alden Richards	Nominated	
41st PMPC Star Awards for Movies	November 30, 2025	Takilya King of the Year	Alden Richards	Won	
41st PMPC Star Awards for Movies	November 30, 2025	Movie Actress of the Year	Kathryn Bernardo	Nominated	
41st PMPC Star Awards for Movies	November 30, 2025	Takilya Queen of the Year	Kathryn Bernardo	Won	
41st PMPC Star Awards for Movies	November 30, 2025	Movie Supporting Actor of the Year	Joross Gamboa	Nominated	
41st PMPC Star Awards for Movies	November 30, 2025	Movie Ensemble Acting of the Year	Hello, Love, Again	Nominated	
41st PMPC Star Awards for Movies	November 30, 2025	Movie Screenwriter of the Year	Carmina Raymundo, Crystal Hazel San Miguel	Nominated	
41st PMPC Star Awards for Movies	November 30, 2025	Movie Cinematographer of the Year	Noel Teehankee	Nominated	
41st PMPC Star Awards for Movies	November 30, 2025	Movie Editor of the Year	Marya Ignacio	Nominated	
41st PMPC Star Awards for Movies	November 30, 2025	Movie Musical Scorer of the Year	Jessie Lasaten	Nominated	
41st PMPC Star Awards for Movies	November 30, 2025	Movie Production Designer of the Year	Norico Santos	Nominated	
41st PMPC Star Awards for Movies	November 30, 2025	Movie Sound Engineer of the Year	Narubeth Peemya	Nominated	
41st PMPC Star Awards for Movies	November 30, 2025	Movie Love Team of the Year	Kathryn Bernardo and Alden Richards (KathDen)	Nominated	
21st Gawad Tanglaw	December 17, 2025	Best Supporting Actor (Film)	Joross Gamboa	Won	
