= Kathryn Bernardo =

Filipino actress and singer (born 1996)

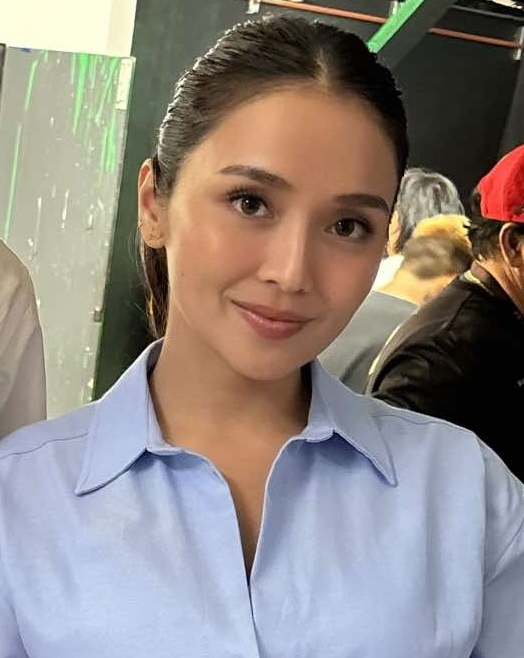
- Bernardo in 2025
- Born: Kathryn Chandria Manuel Bernardo; March 26, 1996 (age 30); Cabanatuan, Nueva Ecija, Philippines
- Education: Enderun Colleges
- Occupations: Actress; singer
- Years active: 2003–present
- Agent: Star Magic (2003–present)
- Awards: Full list
- Musical career
- Genres: Pop; OPM
- Instrument: Vocals
- Years active: 2014–present
- Label: Star Music

Kathryn Chandria Manuel Bernardo (born March 26, 1996) is a Filipino actress. Known for her work in mainstream productions, she has starred in three of the highest-grossing Filipino films of all time; The Hows of Us (2018), Hello, Love, Goodbye (2019), and Hello, Love, Again (2024). Her accolades include a Seoul International Drama Award, an Asian World Film Festival Award, two FAMAS Awards, and 14 Box Office Entertainment Awards.

Born in Cabanatuan, Nueva Ecija, Bernardo began her career as a child actress in the 2000s and rose to prominence for her role as one of the title characters in Mara Clara (2010). She gained wider audience for her portrayal of a lost princess in the romantic drama Princess and I (2012), the first of several collaborations with actor Daniel Padilla. Later that year, she played a young embalmer in the supernatural horror Pagpag: Siyam na Buhay, earning a nomination for the Metro Manila Film Festival Award for Best Actress. Bernardo achieved further commercial success through a series of romantic films, including The Hows of Us (2018), for which she won the Star Award for Movie Actress of the Year.

For her portrayal of a struggling domestic worker in the romantic drama Hello, Love, Goodbye (2019), she received nominations for the Luna Award and Gawad Urian for Best Actress. She later explored roles in other genres, starring opposite Dolly de Leon in the black comedy A Very Good Girl (2023), which earned her the FAMAS Award for Best Actress. Forbes Asia named her one of the most influential people in Asia-Pacific.

== Early life and education ==
Kathryn Chandria Manuel Bernardo was born on March 26, 1996 in Cabanatuan, Nueva Ecija, Philippines. She is the youngest of four siblings and was raised by her parents, Luzviminda and Teodore Bernardo.

Before her acting debut in 2003, Bernardo attended Flowerlane Montessori Children's House in Cabanatuan and later OB Montessori Center in Quezon City. Due to her busy schedule, she joined UST Angelicum College's homeschooling program in 2011. While pursuing a marketing degree at Enderun Colleges, she had to pause her studies because of scheduling conflicts with her television series Got to Believe. As of 2021, she expressed her desire to earn a college degree in marketing or communication arts.

== Career ==
=== 2003–2011: Early career and breakthrough ===
Bernardo began acting in 2003, she appeared as the young Cielo in ABS-CBN's It Might Be You. In 2006, she had her first main role in the TV series Super Inggo, playing Maya, the love interest of the main character. Afterwards, she appeared in various ABS-CBN shows, including Krystala and Vietnam Rose, before joining the children sketch comedy show Goin' Bulilit.

As a child actress, Bernardo played the roles of young Victoria in ABS-CBN's Magkaribal and young Jenny in GMA's Endless Love, and both shows premiered on June 28, 2010.

Her breakthrough role came when she bagged the leading role of Mara David in the remake of 1992 drama series Mara Clara. The series was a smashing hit and solidified her reputation as a rising actress. Following the success of Mara Clara series, Bernardo starred in the teen-oriented show Growing Up, where she played Ella, a 15-year-old girl living with her single mother.

Bernardo's film career started in 2003 appearing in a cameo role as young lupe in the movie Lupe: A Seaman's Wife. The following year, she was cast in the superhero comedy film Gagamboy and played the role of Tsoknat, directed by Erik Matti. However, she gained wider prominence in the family drama movie Way Back Home directed by Jerry Lopez Sineneng which she starred alongside Mara Clara co-star Julia Montes in 2011. In the same year, she joined the cast in the horror film Shake, Rattle & Roll 13, her performance in the movie was received with positive reviews from critics.

=== 2012–2023: Partnership with Daniel Padilla ===
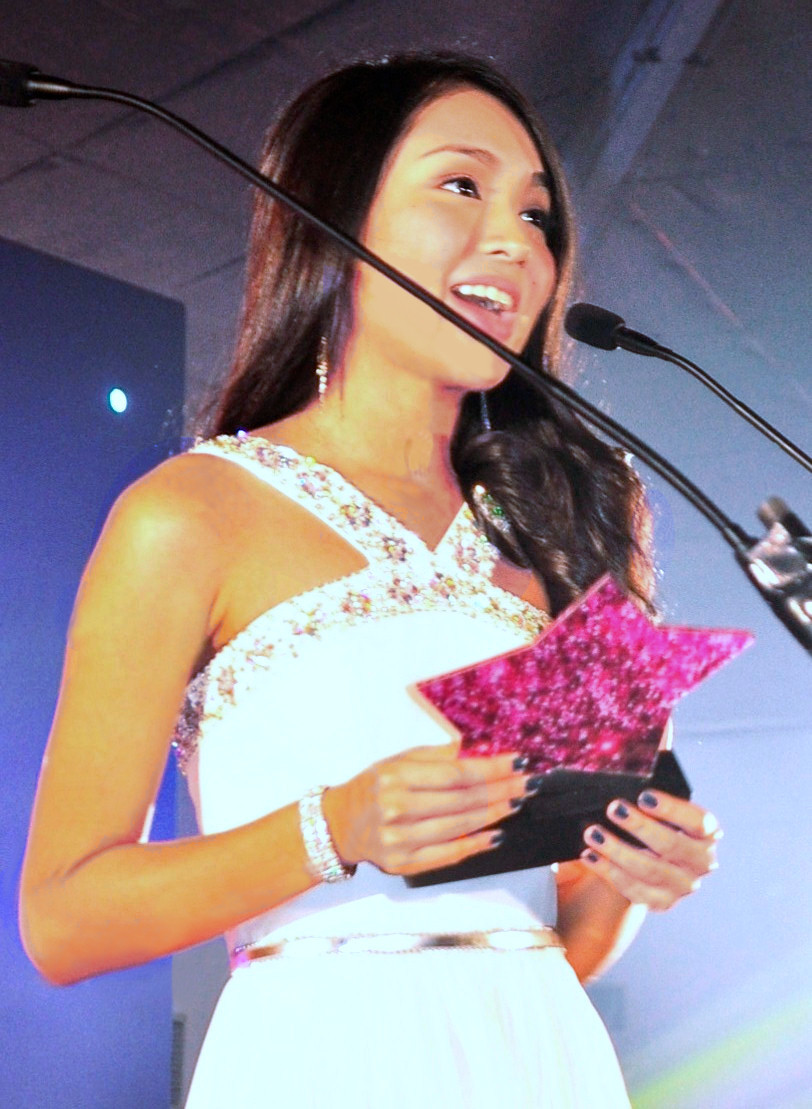
Bernardo at the Candy Style Awards, May 2013

After the success of Mara Clara, Bernardo further rose to prominence in the top-rating primetime drama series Princess and I, co-starred alongside Daniel Padilla and Enrique Gil. In the series, she played the titular role of Mikay/Princess Areeyah. The show was notable for being the first Philippine series filmed in Bhutan, earning acclaimed for its grand production. Later that year, Bernardo and Padilla joined the ensemble cast of the romantic-comedy film 24/7 in Love and the comedy-parody film Sisterakas alongside Vice Ganda which was an official entry to 2012 Metro Manila Film Festival.

Dubbed as KathNiel, their first starring film as a tandem was in the coming-of-age romantic comedy film Must Be... Love, which was released in March 2013. In August of that year, they paired up in the television series Got to Believe, which sustained high ratings in its entire run. In December 2013, they starred in the horror film Pagpag which was an entry to the 39th Metro Manila Film Festival. Their collaboration continued with the successful film adaptation of She's Dating the Gangster in July 2014, which was one of the highest-grossing films of the year. Bernardo and Padilla received stars on the Eastwood Walk of Fame in Quezon City, a recognition of their contributions to Philippine entertainment industry in December 2014.

Over the years, Bernardo and Padilla collaborated on several successful films and television series. They teamed up in the 2015 film Crazy Beautiful You, followed by the 2016 film Barcelona: A Love Untold, which became the second highest-grossing film of that year. For the first time, Bernardo received her Box Office Queen title in Barcelona: A Love Untold at the 48th Box Office Entertainment Awards in 2017. Their partnership continued in Can't Help Falling in Love in 2017. All of these films achieved significant box office success.

On television, they starred together in the 2015 remake of Pangako Sa 'Yo. They continued their partnership on the small screen in the fantasy series La Luna Sangre in 2017.

In 2018, Bernardo made history as the first Filipino actress to reach the local box office of ₱800 million pesos mark in The Hows of Us alongside Padilla. For her performance, she won her first Best Actress award at the 35th PMPC Star Awards for Movies and at the 2019 EDDYS Award. The next year, she achieved this box office milestone again in Hello, Love, Goodbye, with GMA actor Alden Richards. The film was commercially successful as it grossed ₱880 million worldwide; breaking box office records in the Philippines and overseas. The movie held the record of being the highest-grossing Filipino film of all time for more than four years (2019–2024). In these two successful movies, Bernardo received the Phenomenal Box Office Star awards twice at the Box Office Entertainment Awards for two consecutive years (2019-2020) and she also won Film Actress of the Year award in 2020.

In 2022, Bernardo reunited with Padilla in the television series 2 Good 2 Be True, marking their final project together before their eventual break-up in 2023. She was hailed as the Outstanding Asian Star at the 18th Seoul International Drama Awards.

=== 2023–present: Critical acclaim and continued success ===
In 2023, Bernardo starred in A Very Good Girl, her first solo film in several years, alongside Dolly de Leon. For her performance, she earned her first Best Actress Award at the 72nd FAMAS Awards in 2024. Internationally, she also won the National Winner Award for Best Actress in a Leading Role at the Asian Academy Creative Awards. In that same year, she regained the Box Office Queen title for the second time in the 52nd GMMSF Box-Office Entertainment Awards.

After five years, Bernardo reunited with Alden Richards in Hello, Love, Again, the sequel of their 2019 film Hello, Love, Goodbye. The film was commercially successful worldwide becoming the first Filipino film to gross over ₱1 billion. She was honored with the Star Rising Leopard Award at the 10th Asian World Film Festival in November 2024.

In 2025, she returned to television as one of the judges for the seventh season of Pilipinas Got Talent.

In August 2025, Bernardo was announced to star in a new television project under Dreamscape Entertainment. She would be working with James Reid for the very first time. Someone, Someday is a romantic drama series that premiered in July 2026. Bernardo plays the lead character Billy Cariño, a young businesswoman serving as the chief executive officer (CEO) of a fictional dating app.

== Personal life ==
Bernardo was raised as a member of Iglesia ni Cristo. In 2016, she reportedly became a born-again Christian.

In 2018, Bernardo confirmed her long-term relationship with actor Daniel Padilla, which began on May 25, 2012. On November 30, 2023, the pair announced the end of their relationship.

Since April 2024, she has owned a house in Antipolo.

=== Business ventures ===
In 2017, Bernardo launched her nail salon business, KathNails by KCMB, which has eight branches across the Philippines.

In 2019, Bernardo and her partner at the time, Daniel Padilla, opened their first business venture together, a barbershop named the Barbero Blues, located in front of Kathnails by KCMB, Bernardo's nail salon.

In 2020, Bernardo, a self-proclaimed foodie, tried her luck in the food business by starting a rice meal take-out franchise, Rice in a Box, which has over 100 franchises across the Philippines under the Binondo Food Group, owned by Lester Pimentel, the action movie director that Bernardo had worked with during her La Luna Sangre series.

In 2022, she opened another nail salon, The Glow Up Lounge, which has five branches nationwide.

She co-founded a boutique hotel, Isla Amara, in El Nido, Palawan in 2022, alongside actor Piolo Pascual and other partners.

In September 2025, together with her family, Bernardo launched a new business venture, EMPOLO MNL, a fashion sanitary ware brand from Germany. The company recently celebrated the grand opening of its new branch in Greenhills, San Juan, with Bernardo and her family in attendance. The brand focuses on precision, purity, and design for modern living spaces.

== Filmography ==
=== Film ===
Year	Title	Role	Notes
2003	Lupe: A Seamans Wife	young Lupe	
2004	Gagamboy	Tsoknat	
2005	Nasaan Ka Man	young Pilar	
2006	Tatlong Baraha	Inah Valiente	
2008	Supahpapalicious	Athena	Cameo
2011	Way Back Home	Joanna Santiago / Ana Bartolome	
2011	Shake, Rattle & Roll 13	Lucy	Segment: "Parola"
2012	24/7 in Love	Jane Dela Cuesta	
2012	Sisterakas	Katherine "Kathy" Maningas	
2013	Must Be... Love	Patricia "Patchot" Espinosa	
2013	Pagpag: Siyam na Buhay	Leni dela Torre	
2014	She's Dating the Gangster	Athena Dizon / Kelay Dizon	
2015	Crazy Beautiful You	Jacqueline "Jackie" Serrano	
2016	Barcelona: A Love Untold	Mia Angela Dela Torre / Celine Antipala	
2017	Can't Help Falling in Love	Gabriela "Gab" Benedictos Dela Cuesta	
2017	Gandarrapiddo: The Revenger Squad	Chino's love interest	Cameo
2018	The Hows of Us	Georgina "George" Reyes	
2018	Three Words to Forever	Tin Andrada	
2019	Hello, Love, Goodbye	Joy Marie Fabregas	
2023	A Very Good Girl	Philomena "Philo" Angeles / Mercy Novela	
2024	Hello, Love, Again	Joy Marie Fabregas	

=== Television ===
Year	Title	Role	Notes
2003	It Might Be You	young Cielo San Carlos	Special participation
2003	Sana'y Wala Nang Wakas	young Shane Diwata	
2004	SCQ Reload Ok-Ako	Jobelle	
2004	Magpakailanman	young Grace Padaca	Episode: "Tagumpay sa Kabila ng Lahat" (The Grace Padaca Story)
2004	Krystala	Bulinggit	
2005	Vietnam Rose	young Carina Mojica dela Cerna	
2005	Maalaala Mo Kaya	young Diana	Episode: "Bato"
2005	Maalaala Mo Kaya	young Jovi	Episode: "Paru-paro"
2005	Maalaala Mo Kaya		Episode: "Fried Chicken"
2005–2008	Goin' Bulilit	Herself	
2006	Gulong ng Palad	young Mimi Sandoval	Extended cast
2006	Komiks Presents: Agua Bendita	young Agua Cristi / Bendita Cristi	
2006	Komiks Presents: Bandanang Itim	Juliana	
2006	Super Inggo	Maya Guevarra	
2006	Maalaala Mo Kaya	young Mayor Lina Bagasina	Episode: "Palaisdaan"
2007	Pangarap na Bituin	young Chorva Ayala Gomez	
2007	Prinsesa ng Banyera	young Mayumi Burgos / Daphne G. Pertierra	Special participation
2007	Maalaala Mo Kaya		Episode: "Banyera"
2007	Maalaala Mo Kaya	young Chippy Impreso	Episode: "Airport"
2008	Maalaala Mo Kaya	Zorayda	Episode: "Bracelet"
2009	Your Song Presents: You Know It's Christmas	Stephanie	
2009	Maalaala Mo Kaya	young Nympha	Episode: "Blusa"
2009	Maalaala Mo Kaya		Episode: "Karnabal"
2009	Super Inggo at ang Super Tropa	Maya Guevarra	Voice only
2010	Shout Out!	Herself	Co-host
2010	Endless Love	young Jenny Dizon / Jenny Cruz	Special participation
2010	Magkaribal	young Anna Abella / Victoria Valera	Special participation; 2 episodes
2010	Mara Clara	Mara del Valle	Lead role
2011	Wansapanataym: Apir Disapir	Jenny	
2011	Growing Up	Mikaella "Ella" Dimalanta	Lead role
2012	Maalaala Mo Kaya	Dang	Episode: "Ensaymada"
2012–2013	Princess and I	Maria Mikaela "Mikay" dela Rosa / Princess Areeyah Rinpoche	Lead role
2013–2014	Got to Believe	Cristina Carlotta "Chichay" Tampipi	Lead role
2014	Be Careful with My Heart	young Felicidad Marcelo-Alejo	Special participation
2014	Wansapanataym: Puppy ko si Papi	Iris	
2015	Maalaala Mo Kaya	Daisy May Ravelo Torres	Episode: "Parol"
2015–2016	Pangako Sa 'Yo	Yna Macaspac / Maria Amor de Jesus	Lead role
2017–2018	La Luna Sangre	Malia Rodriguez	Lead role
2022	2 Good 2 Be True	Alisson "Ali" Fajardo	Lead role
2025	Pilipinas Got Talent	Herself	Judge (season 7)
2026	Someone, Someday	Benilda "Billy" Cariño	Lead role

=== Web series ===
Year	Title	Role
2020	The House Arrest of Us	Queencess "Q" Capili

=== Dubbing ===
Title	Role	Dubbing actor	Ref.
Enchanted	Giselle	Amy Adams	

== Discography ==
=== Album ===
Year	Album title	Details	Certification	Ref.
2014	Kathryn	Release date: November 26, 2014; Producer: Roque Balaoro Santos; Record label: Star Music	PARI: Platinum	

=== Singles ===
Year	Track	Album	Details	Ref.
2012	"Mula Noon Hanggang Ngayon"	Love Songs from Princess and I	Original artist: Lea Salonga; Related work: Princess and I; Release date: June 15, 2012; Label: Star Music	
2013	"Pagdating ng Panahon"	Got to Believe (The Official Soundtrack)	Related work: Got to Believe; Release date: December 10, 2013; Label: Star Music	
2013	"Got to Believe in Magic" (with Daniel Padilla)	Got to Believe (The Official Soundtrack)	Related work: Got to Believe; Release date: December 10, 2013; Label: Star Music	
2014	"PinaSmile" (with Daniel Padilla)	ABS-CBN Summer Station ID	Directed by: Peewee Gonzales and Paolo Ramos; Producer: Christian Faustino; Studio: ABS-CBN	
2014	"You Don't Know Me"	Kathryn	Words & Music by: Marion Aunor; Release date: December 24, 2014; Studio: Star Music	
2014	"Ikaw Na Nga Yata"	Kathryn	Related work: Bel Ami; Studio: ABS-CBN	
2014	"Mr. DJ"	Kathryn	Release date: March 8, 2015; Studio: Star Music	
2017	"Share the Love" (with Daniel Padilla, Janella Salvador and Elmo Magalona)	—N/a	Written by: Robert Labayen, Angela Suarez; Music by: Lloyd Oliver "Tiny" Corpuz; *Produced by: Raizo Chabeldin	

=== Music video appearances ===
Year	Title	Performer	Director	Ref.
2020	Sa Susunod Na Habang Buhay	Ben&Ben	Jorel Lising	

== Awards and nominations ==
In December 2014, Kathryn Bernardo along with 23 other actors, was given her star at the Eastwood City Walk of Fame, the Philippine version of Hollywood Walk of Fame.

In October 2025, Madame Tussauds Hong Kong revealed in a social media post that Bernardo will be having her wax figure in their museum. It was launched on July 9, 2026.
