= Crazy Beautiful You =

2015 film by Mae Czarina Cruz-Alviar

- Theatrical movie poster
- Directed by: Mae Cruz-Alviar
- Screenplay by: Maan Dimaculangan-Fampulme; Bianca B. Bernardino; Jancy E. Nicolas; Carmi G. Raymundo
- Story by: Rory B. Quintos
- Produced by: Charo Santos-Concio; Malou N. Santos
- Starring: Kathryn Bernardo; Daniel Padilla
- Cinematography: Dan Villegas; Moises Zee
- Edited by: Marya Ignacio
- Music by: Jesse Lucas
- Production company: Star Cinema
- Distributed by: ABS-CBN Film Productions
- Release date: February 25, 2015
- Country: Philippines
- Language: Filipino
- Box office: ₱320 million

Crazy Beautiful You is a 2015 Filipino teen romantic comedy drama film directed by Mae Cruz-Alviar and written by Maan Dimaculangan-Fampulme, Bianca B. Bernardino, Jancy E. Nicolas, and Carmi G. Raymundo from a story concept developed by Rory B. Quintos. The film stars Kathryn Bernardo and Daniel Padilla, with the supporting cast includes Lorna Tolentino, Gabby Concepcion, and Iñigo Pascual.

Produced and distributed by ABS-CBN Film Productions, the film premiered in Philippine theaters on February 25, 2015.

== Plot ==
Jackie is a troubled, nineteen-year-old wild child, much to the dismay of her separated parents. Her only interest lies in photography, and she hopes that she can one day move to New York to study and escape her complicated life. One night, Jackie is thrown in jail after crashing her car while drag racing with some other teenagers. Finally fed up of Jackie's reckless antics, her father sends her off to spend time with her mother on a medical mission camp in Tarlac. Both her parents are hopeful that the experience will straighten her out. Jackie, however, has no intention of following through with orders and tries to sneak out of the house, only to be stopped by her older brother who was sent by their mother to collect her.

During the car trip, Jackie points out that she never got over the fact that her mother didn't take her with her when she left her father. Jackie convinces her brother to stop for a bathroom break at a marketplace where she attempts to escape yet again. Here she meets the lively Kiko, who helps her retrieve her mobile phone from a thief. She offers to pay Kiko to take her to the nearest bus terminal so she can head back to Manila; however, she is shocked when he takes her to a hotel where her mother is waiting for her. It is revealed that Kiko knew who Jackie was all along and is one of the coordinators for the volunteer medical mission. He had been assigned by both Jackie's mother and the mayor of the town (who is also his father), to act as Jackie's escort and guide on the trip.

While at the hotel, in one last bid to escape, Jackie manages to trick Kiko and proceeds to take his car. It is only when she's driving for some time that she discovers Kiko's younger brother is in the car. She drops him off intending to leave him; however, guilt gets the better of her and she stays with him until Kiko finds them and takes them back. Later on, Kiko is seen bailing his carefree mother out of jail. At the mayor's house, Kiko tells Jackie that while the mayor is his father he does not live there as he has a different family. He, however, lives with his mother and three younger siblings, acting as head of the family. It is here also that Jackie becomes acquainted with Marcus, Kiko's brother, via video call. Marcus, currently studying abroad, had first noticed Jackie after seeing her in Manila while she was drag racing, and has been infatuated with her ever since.

Back at the hotel, Jackie's mother makes a deal with her that if she completes the full period of the medical mission, she will fund Jackie's studies in New York and give her the freedom she desperately seeks. The next day, Kiko takes Jackie to the medical mission in a remote mountain community where she initially finds it difficult to adjust to the conditions. After her mother arrives at the medical mission, Jackie becomes visibly upset after seeing her being openly affectionate with the children she is treating. Jackie runs off, and her mother follows after which she demands to know the reason why she was the one left behind. Her mother reveals that she made multiple attempts to take Jackie with her; however, her father prevented any previous contact. Jackie voices her struggle with growing up without her mother and expresses her inability to forgive her. She walks off, determined to finally leave once and for all, only to be followed by Kiko.

Kiko scolds Jackie for her constant wallowing in self-pity when others are suffering too. Kiko then receives a frantic call from his younger brother that his sister Nene is bleeding for an unknown reason. Jackie drives Kiko back and helps out his sister, after learning that she had just gotten her period. Kiko thanks Jackie for her help and takes her to the bus terminal; however, she has a change of heart and goes back to the medical mission to fulfil her deal for her New York plans.

Jackie begins to put more effort into the mission and becomes closer to the people of the community. She also manages to patch things up with her mother and soon, she and Kiko find themselves falling in love. Marcus returns from the U.S early and visits the medical mission. He and Kiko end up competing for Jackie's affection, and Kiko decides to give Jackie up out of love for his brother. Jackie directly and firmly rejects Marcus' advances, because she is in love with Kiko. Hurt that Kiko would give her up so easily, she confronts him for not fighting for love and leaves for Manila. Meanwhile, Marcus confronts Kiko for always being the better of the two of them and a fight ensues, broken up by their father and his wife. Kiko finally talks to his father and asks him to fight for him too, because he is also his son. Heartbroken, Jackie and Kiko have both gone their separate ways.

The mayor finally decides to establish more of a father-son relationship with Kiko, while Jackie has decided not to go to New York but to help her mother in her charitable works. Marcus and Kiko reconcile and they go to Manila to find Jackie again. Kiko calls Jackie and manages to find her in Manila. He admits his feelings for her and the two become a couple. The movie ends in a romantic shot of Jackie and Kiko happily.

== Cast ==
=== Main cast ===
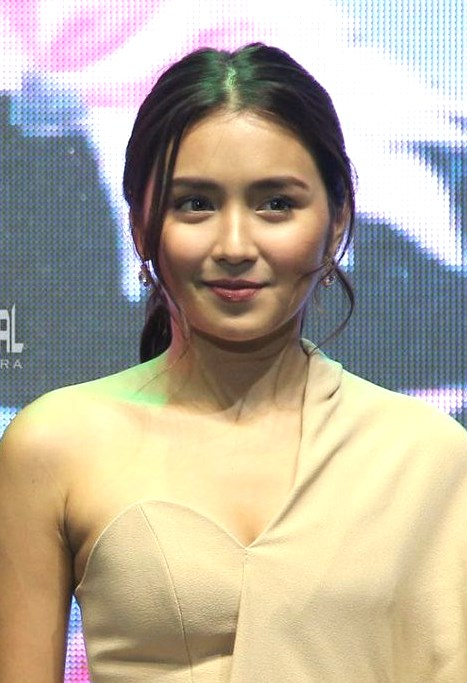
Kathryn Bernardo portrays Jacqueline "Jackie" Serrano.

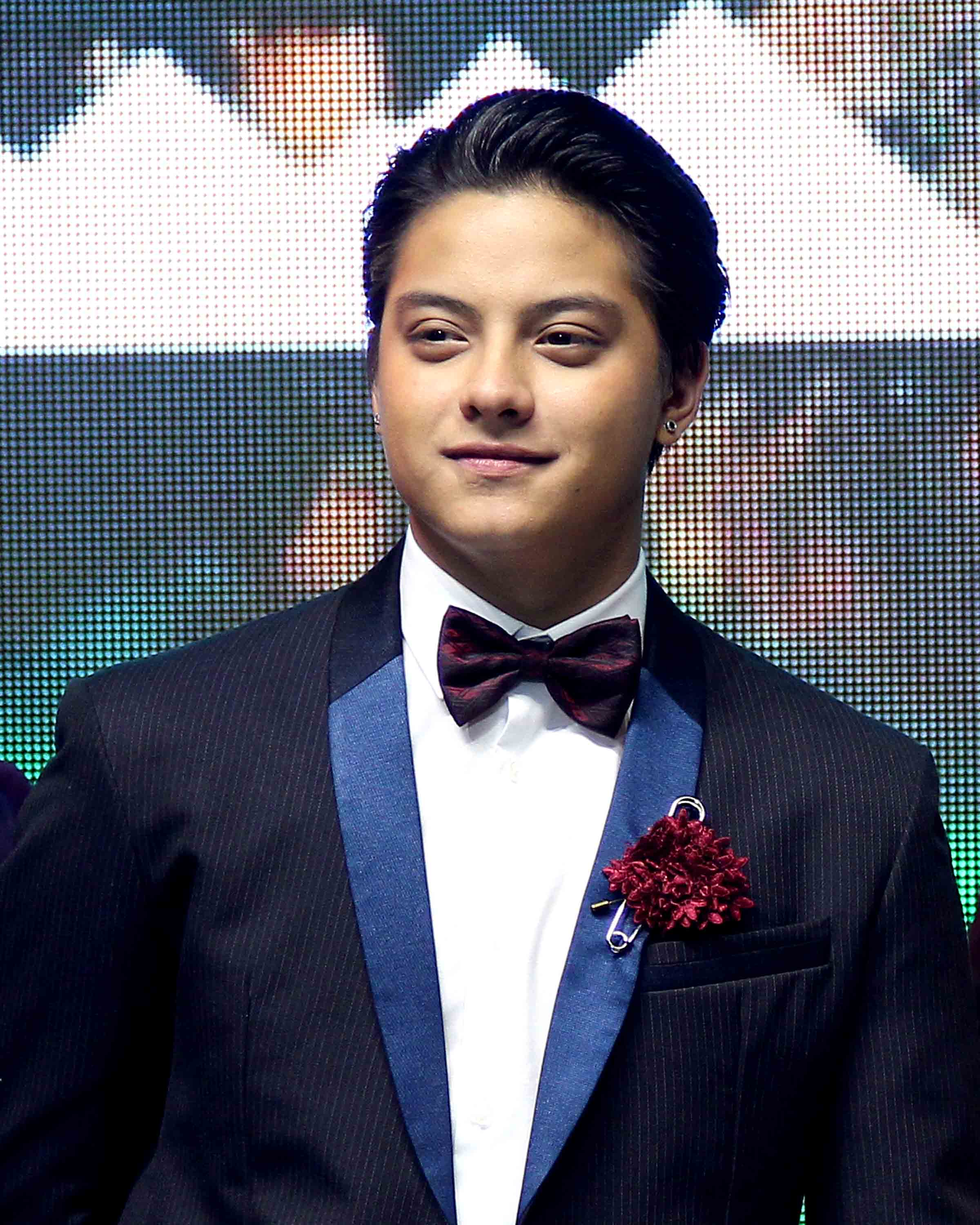
Daniel Padilla portrays Kiko Alcantara.

- Kathryn Bernardo as Jacqueline "Jackie" Serrano
- Daniel Padilla as Kiko Alcantara

=== Supporting cast ===
- Lorna Tolentino as Dra. Leah Serrano
- Gabby Concepcion as Mayor Ito Alcantara
- Iñigo Pascual as Marcus Alcantara
- Dante Ponce as Arthur Serrano
- Cheska Iñigo as Ellen Alcantara
- Assunta de Rossi as Carmela Velasco
- Cacai Bautista as Madame Tweety
- Bryan Santos as John
- Hyubs Azarcon as Dave
- Kiray as Kim
- Neil Coleta as Darwin
- Thou Reyes as Dencio
- Menggie Cobarrubias as Lolo Ponchong
- JM Ibañez as Tintoy
- Andrea Brillantes as Nene
- Inah Estrada as Andy
- Loisa Andalio as Mia
- Chienna Filomeno as Lauren
- Tippy Dos Santos as Margaret Alcantara
- Dominic Roque as Male Car Racer
- Jennie Dela Cruz as Jennie
- Sheena Ocampo as Sheena

=== Special participation ===
- Morissette as herself (love team for Jackie and Kiko)

== International release ==
Due to the film's box office success, it was screened in the United States and Canada on March 6. It earned $500,000 in its first 3 days of showing in North America. After only 10 days, it had earned $1.2 million. It continued to be shown in North America for 11 more days. It was also shown in the UK, France, Italy and other cities in Europe, as well as Asia, New Zealand, and Australia.

It is only the second movie after Starting Over Again to breach the $2 million mark in box office receipts outside the Philippines.

== Box office ==
On its first day of screening, Crazy Beautiful You earned at least ₱32 million. On its second day, Crazy Beautiful You opened more theaters across the nation to accommodate more viewers. From 178 theaters on its first day, it opened to 264 theaters the following day, Mico Del Rosario (AdProm Manager) posted on his Instagram account. The film had already grossed at least ₱320 million by the end of the first quarter of 2015.

== Awards ==
Year	Award-Giving Body	Category	Recipient(s) and nominee(s)	Result	Ref.
2016	FAMAS Awards	Best Actor	Daniel Padilla	Nominated	
2016	2016 PMPC Star Awards	Movie Love Team of the Year	Daniel Padilla & Kathryn Bernardo	Nominated	
2016	2016 PMPC Star Awards	Movie Actor of the Year	Daniel Padilla	Nominated	
2016	GMMSF Box-Office Entertainment Awards	Prince of Philippine Movies	Daniel Padilla	Won	
2016	GMMSF Box-Office Entertainment Awards	Princess of Philippine Movies	Kathryn Bernardo	Won	
2016	PEP List Awards	Movie Star of the Year	Daniel Padilla	Won	

== See also ==
- Can't Help Falling in Love
- List of highest-grossing Filipino films of all time
- Top ten grossing films of 2015
