= Hello, Love, Goodbye =

2019 Philippine romantic drama film

- Theatrical release poster
- Directed by: Cathy Garcia-Molina
- Screenplay by: Carmi G. Raymundo; Rona Co; Crystal S. San Miguel; Cathy Garcia-Molina
- Story by: Carmi G. Raymundo
- Produced by: John Leo D. Garcia; Carmi G. Raymundo
- Starring: Kathryn Bernardo; Alden Richards
- Cinematography: Noel Teehankee
- Edited by: Marya Ignacio
- Music by: Jessie Q. Lasaten
- Production company: ABS-CBN Film Productions
- Distributed by: Star Cinema
- Release date: July 31, 2019
- Running time: 117 minutes
- Country: Philippines
- Language: Filipino
- Box office: ₱880.6 million

Hello, Love, Goodbye is a 2019 Filipino romantic drama film directed by Cathy Garcia-Molina and produced by Carlo L. Katigbak and Olivia M. Lamasan from a story and screenplay written by Carmi G. Raymundo, with Rona Co, Crystal S. San Miguel, and Garcia-Molina co-writing the latter. It stars Kathryn Bernardo and Alden Richards, with several cast members including Kakai Bautista, Lito Pimentel, Joross Gamboa, Maymay Entrata, Lovely Abella, and Jameson Blake. In the film, a struggling domestic worker and a bartender attempt to reconcile their personal careers and love for each other in Hong Kong.

With a total revenue of ₱880 million, Hello, Love, Goodbye became the highest-grossing Philippine film of all time until it was surpassed by Rewind in January 2024. It won several international and local accolades, including Asian Academy Creative Awards, Box Office Entertainment and PMPC Star awards. Produced and distributed by Star Cinema, the film was theatrically released on July 31, 2019, in the Philippines and started screening internationally on August 1, 2019. A sequel, Hello, Love, Again, was released on November 13, 2024, with Kathryn Bernardo and Alden Richards reprising their roles.

== Plot ==
Joy is a Filipino domestic helper in Hong Kong despite having a degree in nursing. She aims to save enough money to find a better job in Canada and bring over her family from the Philippines. To attain this goal, she takes on side hustles even though it violates her work permit. However, her father Celso is adamant that the family should migrate to Hong Kong to be reunited with his estranged wife Lita, who is married to Wayne, a Hongkonger who abuses her. While working illegally as a bar tout in Lan Kwai Fong, Joy catches the attention of the Filipino bartender Ethan, whom she rebuffs. When police officers conduct a random inspection on foreign workers, Joy hastily kisses Ethan to distract them.

Joy initially resists Ethan's advances, but after enduring an awkward visit to Lita, being scolded by her employer, and encountering her ex-boyfriend JM and his wife, Joy agrees to have a one-night stand with Ethan at a motel. As they are about to begin, Joy rushes out and cries. As Ethan follows, she explains her frustrations with life, while Ethan confesses to being a womanizer who is unsure of what to do in life. This leads to a conditional understanding between them to comfort each other in the remaining four months before Joy moves to Canada.

Ethan helps Joy get hired as a dishwasher at the bar. One night, Ethan's younger brother Edward has a drunken outburst at the bar, accusing Ethan of failing his family responsibilities. Ethan is then absent for several days and Joy traces him to his father Mario's house in Cheung Chau. Ethan then opens up about his past: his parents became Hong Kong residents and moved the family there. He became estranged from his family when he followed his then-girlfriend Tanya to the United States. After their breakup, he was deported for overstaying. Edward, who was left alone to care for the stroke-debilitated Mario, developed a grudge against Ethan. Joy and Ethan then return to Hong Kong Island. Joy finishes first runner-up at a beauty pageant but becomes jealous when Tanya, who is a judge at the pageant, meets with Ethan. But Ethan reassures Joy and their relationship becomes official.

Ethan reveals his plans of setting up his own bar to redeem himself to his family and to convince Joy to remain in Hong Kong. Meanwhile, Joy, who finally has her departure for Canada confirmed, confronts Lita, who had been beaten again by Wayne. Lita confesses that she no longer loves Celso, who forced her into a sham marriage with her then-employer for her to gain permanent residency and later bring the family to Hong Kong. Upon hearing this from Joy, Celso calls off any hope of the family reuniting, throwing Joy's plans into disarray.

Ethan asks Joy if she could pretend to be an investor in his upcoming bar, which means that Joy would have to forego her departure for Canada. This leads to an argument wherein Ethan reveals that he wants to spend his future with Joy, who is steadfast on going to Canada. However, Ethan relents when Joy reminds him that their relationship was bound by the conditions that they had set out previously and chastises him for selfishly discouraging her from pursuing her dreams. Ethan later reconciles with his family and convinces Joy to spend her last days in Hong Kong enjoying each other's company as tourists. As the couple finally profess their love for each other, Ethan promises that they will meet again, while Joy promises to visit his bar, provisionally named Ethan's Joy, in the future. The film ends with Joy at the airport on her way to Canada.

== Cast ==
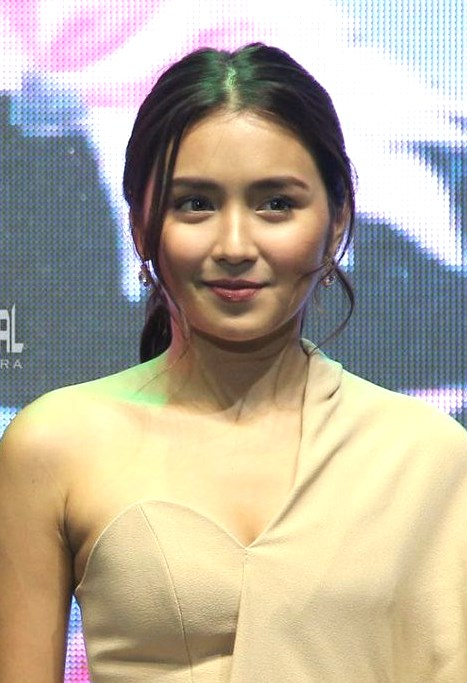
Kathryn Bernardo portrays Joy

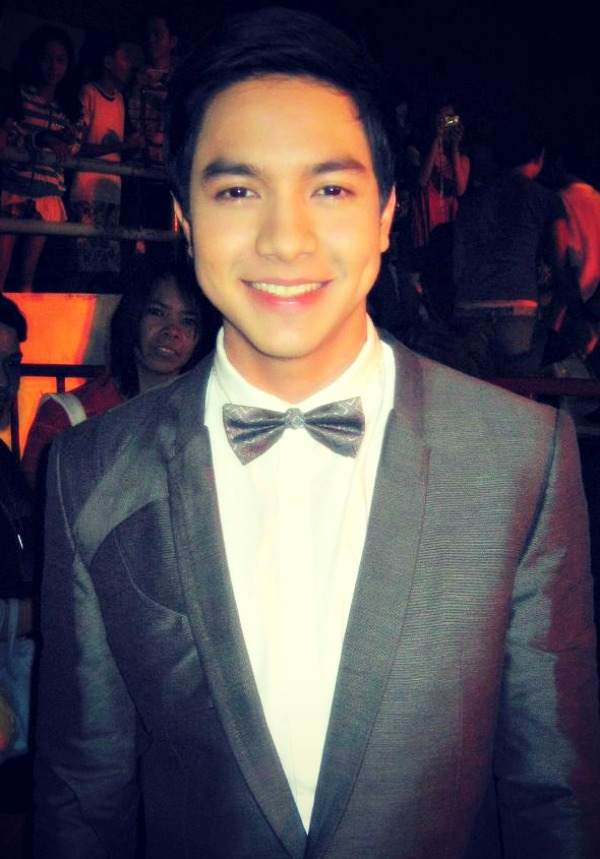
Alden Richards portrays Ethan

Main cast

- Kathryn Bernardo as Joy Marie Fabregas:
  A nursing graduate who works as a domestic helper in Hong Kong.
- Alden Richards as Ethan Del Rosario:
  A bartender who is on his way to attain Hong Kong residency status and is relatively well-off compared to Joy.

Supporting cast

- Kakai Bautista as Sally Daraga:
  Joy's friend and fellow domestic helper.
- Lito Pimentel as Mario Del Rosario:
  Ethan's father
- Joross Gamboa as Jhim Gabriel:
  Ethan's friend and fellow bartender.
- Maymay Entrata as Mary Dale Fabregas:
  Joy's cousin who is a novice domestic helper in Hong Kong
- Lovely Abella as Gina Mariquit
  Joy's friend and fellow domestic helper.
- Jameson Blake as Edward Del Rosario:
  Ethan's younger brother
- Jeffrey Tam as Carlo Nicolas
  Ethan's friend and manager at the bar.

Special participation

- William Lorenzo as Celso Fabregas:
  Joy, Joey, and Liezel 's father and Lita's ex-husband
- Anthony Jennings as Eric Del Rosario:
  Ethan's youngest brother
- Wilbert Ross as Joey Fabregas:
  Joy's younger brother
- Aliyah Billote as Liezel Fabregas:
  Joy's youngest sister
- Angela Poliquit as Annie Chung:
  Lin's daughter
- Jon Go as Wayne Choi: Lita's second husband whom she married in the hopes of attaining Hong Kong residency.
- Poon Po Lun Lilac as Lin Chung:
  Joy's employer and Annie's mother
- Pang Mei Sheung as PoPo (Mrs. Chung)
- Maricel Laxa as Lita: Joy, Joey and Liezel's mother; Celso's ex-wife
- Maxine Medina as Tanya Alezar: Ethan's ex-girlfriend
- Jerome Ponce as JM: Joy's ex-boyfriend

== Production ==
The film stars Kathryn Bernardo and Alden Richards. Both are affiliated with the two major rival networks in the Philippines: Bernardo with ABS-CBN and Richards with GMA Network. The two also belonged to two different "love teams": Bernardo with Daniel Padilla in Kathniel and Richards with Maine Mendoza in AlDub. Together, they play the role of two Overseas Filipino Workers (OFWs) in Hong Kong who became romantically involved with each other. Director Cathy Garcia-Molina said that the two main cast members were not subjected to "baby or special treatment" for the film project. Benjie Paras was originally going to be in the film as the father of Bernardo's character, but backed out due to scheduling conflicts.

Filming for Hello, Love, Goodbye in Hong Kong has begun by April 2019, amidst the early period of the 2019–20 Hong Kong protests, and was completed after a month. Principal photography for the film ended by May 19, 2019, in Parañaque. Post-production work for Hello, Love, Goodbye was done in Bangkok, Thailand, with ABS-CBN Film Productions collaborating with Thai production firm Kantana Group. It was the first collaboration between the two firms.

== Release ==
Hello, Love, Goodbye premiered in the Philippines on July 31, 2019. The film also made history in Saudi Arabia as the first Filipino film to be screened in cinemas in Jeddah.

== Reception ==
=== Box office ===
The film became the highest-grossing Filipino film of all time after earning over ₱880.6 million worldwide gross revenue on September 3, 2019, surpassing the film The Hows of Us that was also directed by Molina and starred by Bernardo. This record was held by the film until January 2024, when it was surpassed by Rewind.

==== Domestic ====
The film on its opening day earned a total of ₱34.4 million from over 350 cinemas in the Philippines. Three days after its local release, the film was reported to have earned ₱110.8 million. After four days, the film earned ₱176.6 million and was shown in 465 cinemas nationwide. As of August 12, 2019, the film has grossed ₱505.7 million domestically in 13 days of showing. After 17 days in cinemas, the film has grossed ₱603 million domestically.

==== International ====
The film earned US$2.1 million in box office receipts abroad on its first week of release. The film was also recognized now the highest-grossing Filipino film in the Middle East for earning over US$1 million as of August 18. It is also the highest-grossing Filipino film in Australia, New Zealand and United Kingdom earning over US$195,336, US$60,459 and US$32,313 respectively.

=== Critical response ===
Filipino film critic Philbert Dy gave the film a rating of 4 out of 5 and praised Bernardo's performance. Oggs Cruz, writing for Rappler, reviewed the film thus, "Hello, Love, Goodbye is fine entertainment – one that doesn't dumb down the issues it puts forward for the sake of a standard happy ending." He pointed out that while the romantic plot was formulaic and characters seemed to have become stereotypical, the film's strengths were its depiction of Hong Kong through the female protagonist's perspective and of the struggles of overseas Filipino workers as domestic helpers. In his review, Armando B. Chavez of Philippine Daily Inquirer said that the love story stood out due to the "backdrop of the plight of OFWs in Hong Kong." He also praised the musical editing, the close-up shots of the protagonists, and performances of Bernardo and Richards, describing them as tour de force. He wrote, "This is a date movie if ever there's one. As they say back home, "just feel the feeling." Sit back, secretly dab the tears away... resistance is futile." The Toronto-based The Philippine Reporter, Ysh Cabana wrote "Despite having a woman filmmaker at the helm, it doesn't reflect on the experience of nurses, mostly women, arriving in Canada struggling to take competency assessments or to enter a bridging program just to be able to practice their international education. This reinforces middle-class fantasy production."

Ricky Lo of The Philippine Star gave a generally positive review of the film particularly the comic relief provided by Abella, Bautista, and Entrata. Tito Genova Valiente however disagreed and considered the trio's performances as "aggravating" while praising Bernardo and Richard, stating, "There is Bernardo with perhaps the quietest performance for any actress of her generation. Bernardo can act within a small frame, holding her face solidly as if a slight movement will mar that portrayal... Alden gets the cinematographic love, as well. His Ethan starts fun and ends tragic but with lots of hope, even if it does not matter what happens to that hope. When those tears fall from Richards's eyes, they bring us back to those old, old cinemas of leading men looking beautiful and strong in grief."

=== Accolades ===
Accolades received by Hello, Love, Goodbye
| Award | Date of ceremony | Category | Recipient(s) | Result | Ref. |
|---|---|---|---|---|---|
| AACTA Awards | December 4, 2019 | Best Asian Film | Cathy Garcia-Molina, Olivia M. Lamasan, and Carlo L. Katigbak | Nominated | |
| Asian Academy Creative Awards (Note: Covers non-web-only entities and excludes national winners) | December 3–4, 2020 | Best Direction (Fiction) | Cathy Garcia-Molina | Won | |
| Asian Academy Creative Awards | December 3–4, 2020 | Best Feature Film | Hello, Love, Goodbye | Won | |
| Asian Academy Creative Awards | December 3–4, 2020 | Best Original Screenplay | Carmi Raymundo, Cathy Garcia-Molina, and Rona Go | Won | |
| Box Office Entertainment Awards | October 18, 2020 | Phenomenal Star of Philippine Cinema | Kathryn Bernardo and Alden Richards | Won | |
| Box Office Entertainment Awards | October 18, 2020 | Film Actor of the Year | Alden Richards | Won | |
| Box Office Entertainment Awards | October 18, 2020 | Film Actress of the Year | Kathryn Bernardo | Won | |
| Box Office Entertainment Awards | October 18, 2020 | Most Popular Film Screenwriter | Carmi Raymundo, Rona Go, and Cathy Garcia-Molina | Won | |
| Box Office Entertainment Awards | October 18, 2020 | Most Popular Film Director | Cathy Garcia-Molina | Won | |
| FAMAS Awards | December 20, 2020 | Best Actor | Alden Richards | Nominated | |
| FAMAS Awards | December 20, 2020 | Best Actress | Kathryn Bernardo | Nominated | |
| FAMAS Awards | December 20, 2020 | Best Editing | Maya Ignacio | Nominated | |
| FAMAS Awards | December 20, 2020 | Best Scoring | Jessie Lasaten | Nominated | |
| Gawad Urian Awards | November 10, 2020 | Best Actress | Kathryn Bernardo | Nominated | |
| Gawad Urian Awards | November 10, 2020 | Best Actor | Alden Richards | Nominated | |
| Gawad Urian Awards | November 10, 2020 | Best Supporting Actress | Maricel Laxa | Nominated | |
| Luna Awards | December 18, 2020 | Best Picture | Hello, Love, Goodbye | Nominated | |
| Luna Awards | December 18, 2020 | Best Director | Cathy Garcia-Molina | Nominated | |
| Luna Awards | December 18, 2020 | Best Actress | Kathryn Bernardo | Nominated | |
| Luna Awards | December 18, 2020 | Best Screenplay | Carmi Raymundo, Cathy Garcia-Molina | Nominated | |
| Luna Awards | December 18, 2020 | Best Cinematography | Noel Teehanke | Nominated | |
| Luna Awards | December 18, 2020 | Best Production Design | Norico Santos | Nominated | |
| Luna Awards | December 18, 2020 | Best Editing | Marya Ignacio | Won | |
| Luna Awards | December 18, 2020 | Best Musical Score | Jessie Lasaten | Nominated | |
| PMPC Star Awards for Movies | September 26, 2021 | Movie of the Year | Hello, Love, Goodbye | Won | |
| PMPC Star Awards for Movies | September 26, 2021 | Movie Director of the Year | Cathy Garcia-Molina | Won | |
| PMPC Star Awards for Movies | September 26, 2021 | Movie Actor of the Year | Alden Richards | Won | |
| PMPC Star Awards for Movies | September 26, 2021 | Movie Actress of the Year | Kathryn Bernardo | Nominated | |
| PMPC Star Awards for Movies | September 26, 2021 | Movie Supporting Actress of the Year | Maricel Laxa | Won | |
| PMPC Star Awards for Movies | September 26, 2021 | Movie Ensemble Acting of the Year | Hello, Love, Goodbye | Nominated | |
| PMPC Star Awards for Movies | September 26, 2021 | Movie Screenwriter of the Year | Cathy Garcia-Molina, Carmi Raymundo, and Rona Co | Won | |
| PMPC Star Awards for Movies | September 26, 2021 | Movie Cinematographer of the Year | Noel Teehankee | Nominated | |
| PMPC Star Awards for Movies | September 26, 2021 | Movie Editor of the Year | Marya Ignacio | Nominated | |
| PMPC Star Awards for Movies | September 26, 2021 | Movie Production Designer of the Year | Norico Santos | Nominated | |
| PMPC Star Awards for Movies | September 26, 2021 | Movie Musical Scorer of the Year | Jessie Lasaten | Nominated | |
| PMPC Star Awards for Movies | September 26, 2021 | Movie Loveteam of the Year | Kathryn Bernardo and Alden Richards | Won | |

== Sequel ==
On August 1, 2019, during the opening week of the film, lead actor Alden Richards and director Cathy Garcia-Molina expressed openness on working on a sequel for the film despite the latter's confirming plans to retire from directing to focus on her family. On August 26, 2019, lead actress Kathryn Bernardo has also expressed similar sentiments on doing a sequel for the film. On May 19, 2024, Deadline Hollywood confirmed that Star Cinema and GMA Pictures will be joining forces to develop the film with Kathryn Bernardo and Alden Richards reprising their respective roles as Joy and Ethan. Titled Hello, Love, Again, then film had Cathy Garcia-Sampana returning as its director and was shot in Canada. The film was released on November 13, 2024.

== Novel adaptation ==
A novel adaptation written of Hello, Love, Goodbye, authored by Palanca awardee Charmaine Lasar and published under ABS-CBN Books, was released on August 26, 2019. The novel also includes additional narration on the backstory of Joy, about her life in the Philippines prior to moving to Hong Kong and an epilogue which was not depicted in the film. Behind-the-scenes information, and on-set photos are also included in the novel.
