= Franchesca Floirendo =

Filipino actress, model, and host

Franchesca Diaz Floirendo
- Born: Maria Franchesca Sophia M. Floirendo
- Occupations: Actress, model, host
- Years active: 2015-2018
- Height: 1.7 m (5 ft 7 in)

Franchesca Diaz Floirendo is a Filipina actress, host and model who is best known for her roles on Philippine television as Hannah "Anaconda" Conde in the romantic drama Dolce Amore opposite Liza Soberano, as well as Gabriella "Gab" Crisostomo in Be My Lady, a noontime TV series.

== Career ==
In early 2015, Floirendo was the winner of the I Am MEG Season 3 contest organized by Meg magazine under the One Mega Group. Later that year, she was part of the Star Magic Angels group, a pageant for upcoming artists. She studied in the Ateneo De Manila University where she graduated in 2014.

== Filmography ==
Year	Title	Role	Notes
2015	Luv U	Lani Oropesa	Guest Role (season 2); 1 episode
2016	Doble Kara	Carol	Main Role (season 2);
2016	Ipaglaban Mo!	Liberty	Guest Role (Season 1); 1 episode
2016	Be My Lady	Gab Crisostomo	Main Role
2016	Dolce Amore	Hannah "Anaconda" Conde	Main Role
2016	Love Me Tomorrow	Uncredited	Cameo
2016	Langit Lupa	Daphne	Guest Role
2016-2017	Wansapanataym	Michelle	Main Role (Season 1); 5 episodes
2017	Corpus Delicti	Sam Alvarez	Cameo
