= List of Dolce Amore episodes =

Dolce Amore (English: Sweet Love) is a 2016 Philippine romantic drama television series directed by Mae Cruz-Alviar, Richard I. Arellano, and Cathy Garcia-Molina, starring Liza Soberano and Enrique Gil. The series premiered on ABS-CBN and worldwide on The Filipino Channel on February 15, 2016, replacing Pangako sa 'Yo.

The story is about Serena (Liza Soberano), a rich, sophisticated, and beautiful Italian bella; and Tenten (Enrique Gil), a poor and hardworking Manila boy who will do anything for his family, and how their worlds collide as they search for identity and love.

Dolce Amore aired its last episode on August 26, 2016, with a total of 137 episodes aired.

== Series overview ==
Season	Episodes	Originally released	
Season	Episodes	First released	Last released
1	53	February 15, 2016	April 29, 2016
2	53	May 2, 2016	July 14, 2016
3	31	July 15, 2016	August 26, 2016

== Episode list and Ratings ==
In the tables below, the red numbers represent the lowest ratings and the green numbers represent the highest ratings.

=== Chapter 1 ===
==== February ====
Episode No.	Title	Date Aired	Synopsis	Average audience share	
Episode No.	Title	Date Aired	Synopsis	Kantar Media-TNS Nationwide	AGB Nielsen Mega Manila
1	'Sweet Beginning'	February 15, 2016	The beginning of a sweet sweet story between Serena and Ten Ten begins at two different side of the world.	35.6%	23.7%
2	'Pen Pal'	February 16, 2016	Now that Serena has found out that she is adopted, she is drawn to helping orphaned kids and decides to donate to an orphanage in Manila where Simon lives.	36.0%	22.8%
3	'Wishes'	February 17, 2016	Luciana teaches Serena how to be a princess.	34.9%	19.7%
4	'Hope'	February 18, 2016	Serena starts to look for answers while Tenten continues to work hard for his family.	36.1%	22.6%
5	'Engagement'	February 19, 2016	An announcement from Gian Carlo's father will upset Serena.	33.4%	20.7%
6	'All The Way'	February 22, 2016	Tenten is forced to take on a job as a callboy after Binggoy lost their money to gambling, unaware that it will lead him to Serena.	35.5%	23.2%
7	'Forgive'	February 23, 2016	Tenten's mother begs for Serena's mercy. Can Sese forgive the Raketista of Manila?	35.8%	21.6%
8	'Chase'	February 24, 2016	Tenten meets Serena again, not as a call boy, but as her driver.	32.9%	21.6%
9	'Memory'	February 25, 2016	Fireflies bring comfort to Serena's aching heart.	33.6%	21.7%
10	'Bonding'	February 26, 2016	Serena learns more about the Philippines as Tenten takes her to Divisoria.	33.5%	22.6%
11	'Party'	February 29, 2016	A beautiful night is about to get dangerous. Can Tenten save Serena before it's too late?	33.2%	22.9%
Average				34.6%	22.1%

==== March ====
Episode No.	Title	Date Aired	Synopsis	Average audience share	
Episode No.	Title	Date Aired	Synopsis	Kantar Media-TNS Nationwide	AGB Nielsen Mega Manila
12	'Flashback'	March 1, 2016	Something from the past is about to be revealed.	35.7%	21.8%
13	'EyeBall'	March 2, 2016	Serena searches for her pen pal when she was a child.	34.6%	22.2%
14	'Surprise'	March 3, 2016	Tenten takes Serena to a magical place.yes	37.2%	24%
15	'Discoveries'	March 4, 2016	Tenten finds the courage to tell Sese that he is Simon, but they don't have enough time to get to know each other more as Serena needs to leave for Italy.	34.3%	21%
16	'Bohol'	March 7, 2016	Serena and Tenten take on a new journey in the island of Bohol.	37.5%	23.5%
17	'Firsts'	March 8, 2016	Serena is reunited with her Nanay Melds, who finds Tenten very handsome.	35.6%	23.2%
18	'Feelings'	March 9, 2016	Tenten learns that Serena is about to marry the rich and handsome Gian Carlo De Luca.	32.4%	19.7%
19	'Falling For You'	March 10, 2016	Luciana gives Gian Carlo Serena's contact information.	34.4%	19.5%
20	'PuSo'	March 11, 2016	Gian Carlo discovers that Serena is with Tenten.And Tenten learns how to say the letter "s"	32.8%	20.4%
21	'THIS'	March 14, 2016	With Serena's help, Tenten overcomes his lisp. He soon realizes that he is falling in love with Serena.	35.2%	22.6%
22	'DreamGirl'	March 15, 2016	If winning the heart of Serena is a dream, then Tenten wouldn't want to wake up.	36.8%	22%
23	'Meet The Ibarras'	March 16, 2016	Serena meets Tenten's family.	34.9%	20.9%
24	'Yun Na'	March 17, 2016	Failing to keep Serena off his mind, Tenten begins to realize that he is falling in love with her.	35.1%	21.9%
25	'Date'	March 18, 2016	Get ready for Tenten and Serena's first date.	32%	20.3%
26	'Reality'	March 21, 2016	Will there be another date for Serena and Tenten?	33.7%	21.8%
27	'Basag Trip'	March 22, 2016	Now that Tenten has seen Gian Carlo, he starts to think that pursuing his love for Serena will not make any sense.	34%	18.9%
28	'Emo'	March 23, 2016	Now that Gian Carlo is around, can Tenten still tell Serena how he truly feels for her?	35%	19.5%
29	'Iba Na'	March 28, 2016	While Tenten is losing himself in sadness and desperation, Serena is starting to enjoy Gian Carlo's presence.	31.5%	17.8%
30	'Set Up'	March 29, 2016	Serena wants Tenten to meet Gian Carlo. Is Tenten's heart ready?	33.5%	20.1%
31	'Hopia No More'	March 30, 2016	Tenten finds it hard to hide the fact that he is in love with Serena.	34.4%	17.9%
32	'Ouch'	March 31, 2016	Serena decides to help Tenten by setting up a blind date for him, but she will somehow feel that she has made the wrong decision.	33.8%	18.2%
Average				34.5%	20.8%

==== April ====
Episode No.	Title	Date Aired	Synopsis	Average audience share	
Episode No.	Title	Date Aired	Synopsis	Kantar Media-TNS Nationwide	AGB Nielsen Mega Manila
33	'Double Date'	April 1, 2016	Gian Carlo and Serena plan to tour the Philippines and they want Tenten to join them.	32.1%	17.5%
34	'Pampanga'	April 4, 2016	Sarah's apparent fondness for Tenten makes Serena uneasy.	35.2%	19.5%
35	'Love Symptoms'	April 5, 2016	Serena panics when she discovers that Sarah is in Tenten's room.	33.9%	20%
36	'Pagputok'	April 6, 2016	It becomes obvious to Gian Carlo that Serena is in love with Tenten, which prompts him to immediately book a flight back to Italy.	35.6%	20.9%
37	'Moment of Truth'	April 7, 2016	Tenten gets blamed for Serena and Gian Carlo's petty fight.	34%	19.5%
38	'Say It'	April 8, 2016	It's time for Serena to decide. Will she finally tell Gian Carlo who she really loves?	33.4%	18.6%
39	'The Marchesas'	April 11, 2016	Luciana and Roberto are in the Philippines and Serena wants them to meet Tenten.	33.1%	19.8%
40	'The Invitation'	April 12, 2016	Will Luciana approve of Serena and Tenten's relationship?	34.1%	20.7%
41	'The Big Event'	April 13, 2016	Everyone glams up for the party, including Tenten.	33.8%	18.8%
42	'I Love You'	April 14, 2016	Luciana puts Tenten on the spotlight.	35%	19.9%
43	'Mamma Mia'	April 15, 2016	Luciana has more than just getting to know Tenten and his family on her agenda.	32.4%	18%
44	'Challenge'	April 18, 2016	The Marchesas meet the Ibarras.	31.4%	17.4%
45	'Luciana and Dodoy'	April 19, 2016	Tenten and Serena have a special surprise for Taps and Dodoy.	32.7%	17.4%
46	'Kapit'	April 20, 2016	Taps will not accept any help from Serena's parents, but not everyone in Tenten's family agrees.	31.6%	17.5%
47	'Desperado'	April 21, 2016	Although it's against his mother's will, Binggoy asks for Luciana's help.	32.7%	17.7%
48	'The Big Moves'	April 22, 2016	Desperate for money, Binggoy ransoms Serena. When Tenten finds out, he initially fights Binggoy's plan. However, when Binggoy's life hangs in the balance, Tenten is left with no choice but to help with his brother's schemes.	33.7%	18.6%
49	'Maling Akala'	April 25, 2016	Binggoy sticks to his agreement with Luciana.	34.3%	17.8%
50	'Connection'	April 26, 2016	Luciana wants Tenten out of Serena's life.	33.6%	15.7%
51	'Ciao Italia'	April 27, 2016	Serena lost all her memories due to emotional trauma, which makes it easier for Luciana to control her adopted daughter.	33.1%	15.8%
52	'Begin Again'	April 28, 2016	As Tenten and Serena's hearts take a detour, can love still bring them back to each other?	31.8%	17.5%
53	'Venezia'	April 29, 2016	Serena and Tenten's paths cross as the latter goes to Paris for a music summit.	33.3%	17.7%
Average				33.4%	18.4%

=== Chapter 2 ===
==== May ====
Episode No.	Title	Date Aired	Synopsis	Average audience share	
Episode No.	Title	Date Aired	Synopsis	Kantar Media-TNS Nationwide	AGB Nielsen Mega Manila
54	'Reality Bites'	May 2, 2016	Alicia goes to the Marchesas to reveal her relation to Serena.	31.6%	17.6%
55	'Search'	May 3, 2016	Serena finding the medallion forces Luciana to admit that Serena is adopted.	29.9%	17.1%
56	'Coming Home'	May 4, 2016	Tenten opens his heart for Angel, but what if Serena returns to the Philippines?	31.8%	16.2%
57	'Salubong'	May 5, 2016	In Manila, Serena searches for people and places that can help her regain her memories.	31.4%	17.6%
58	'The Song'	May 6, 2016	Tenten's song is about to lead Serena back to him.	30.9%	15.7%
59	'One Call Away'	May 10, 2016	Destiny is about to bring Tenten and Serena back together.	33.3%	16.9%
60	'Meant To Be'	May 11, 2016	Will Serena finally find what she has been looking for?	35%	17.1%
61	'Forgotten'	May 12, 2016	Serena's indifference toward Tenten bothers him greatly, until he finds out that she has lost her memories.	35.8%	19.1%
62	'It's All Coming Back'	May 13, 2016	Upon coming home from the Urtolas' party, Tenten reveals to Dodoy and Taps that Serena is Angel's long-lost sister.	33.6%	17.4%
63	'Family Feud'	May 16, 2016	Hearing Tenten's newest composition drives Serena into a severe emotional turmoil, which worries everyone around her.	34.9%	19.3%
64	'Bawi'	May 17, 2016	Tenten comes to a decision of telling Angel the truth about who he is in Serena's forgotten past.	34.2%	18.1%
65	'White Lies'	May 18, 2016	Angel plans to reveal the truth to Serena.	30.6%	15.3%
66	'The Plan'	May 19, 2016	Tenten and Angel receive an offer to do an album as a duo.	34%	17.6%
67	'FirefLIEs'	May 20, 2016	It seems like destiny keeps on giving Tenten more opportunities to tell Serena who he really is in her life.	31.2%	15.9%
68	'Stolen Memory'	May 23, 2016	Jei Jei creates a plan to trigger Serena's memories by bringing everyone to a resort where fireflies abound.	32.1%	17.5%
69	'Tuko'	May 24, 2016	Jei Jei successfully scares Serena out of her room, leading her to seek Tenten's help in the middle of the night.	33.5%	17.8%
70	'Memory Spark'	May 25, 2016	Serena learns that Simon's nickname is Tenten.	33.8%	19.5%
71	'Panaginip'	May 26, 2016	Despite their intentions to keep away from each other, Tenten and Serena find themselves composing a love song together in the middle of the night.	34.1%	18.5%
72	'Sa Totoo Lang'	May 27, 2016	Tenten finally admits to Angel that he still has feelings for Serena.	31.8%	17.9%
73	'Scar'	May 30, 2016	Tenten feels that it's about time for Serena to know the truth about her past.	33.6%	18.1%
74	'The Farm'	May 31, 2016	Serena decides to talk to Tenten without her family's knowledge, after learning from her psychiatrist that he may have something to do with her forgotten past.	35%	19.1%
Average				33%	17.6%

==== June ====
Episode No.	Title	Date Aired	Synopsis	Average audience share	
Episode No.	Title	Date Aired	Synopsis	Kantar Media-TNS Nationwide	AGB Nielsen Mega Manila
75	'Bistado'	June 1, 2016	Serena learns more about Tenten and his family, and how they could be connected to her past.	33.9%	16.2%
76	'This Is It'	June 2, 2016	The Urtolas finally decide to tell Serena the truth, Tenten tells Serena that they had a relationship before.	36.3%	17.6%
77	'All Out'	June 3, 2016	Serena gets mad at the Urtolas and Tenten for not telling her the truth and goes back to Italy.... But, Tenten catches up with Serena at the airport and tells her that he will be there when she needs him.	33.5%	17.5%
78	'Face The Fear'	June 6, 2016	Even after hearing Tenten's pleas, Serena remains firm on her decision to return to Italy. While Tenten comes home with a heavy heart, Serena confronts Luciana and calls off her engagement with Gian Carlo.	36.3%	18.1%
79	'Search For Answers'	June 7, 2016	While Tenten is more than happy to walk her through her forgotten memories, Serena makes it clear that she does not intend to rekindle any flame with him.	36%	19.6%
80	'Dreaming Of You'	June 8, 2016	Serena shares an emotional reunion with the Urtolas when she came home and apologized to them. Tenten, on the other hand, sets aside his regrets and musters enough courage to volunteer in helping Serena find herself.	34.3%	17.4%
81	'Close To You'	June 9, 2016	Serena takes Tenten's offer and agrees to relive their previous romance in hopes of triggering her lost memories.	36.7%	18.7%
82	'TLC'	June 10, 2016	After witnessing Serena doing everything uncharacteristic of her, Tenten soon learns how much she just wants to break free of the shadow of her past and of everyone telling her what to be.	35.2%	17.6%
83	'Win Back The Love'	June 13, 2016	Gian Carlo follows Serena to the Philippines to beg her for a second chance, only to find Tenten in Serena's hotel room.	33.6%	18.5%
84	'Ganda Problems'	June 14, 2016	Serena's plan to make her Bohol trip a solo journey to find herself ceases when Tenten and Gian Carlo insist on accompanying her to the province.	35%	18.6%
85	'Battle Of The Exes'	June 15, 2016	Serena continues to struggle with her memories despite Melds' efforts to recall them. Meanwhile, the rivalry between Gian Carlo and Tenten continues.	34%	18.7%
86	'The Race'	June 16, 2016	Gian Carlo wins all the festival games against Tenten, only to realize that Tenten might have gotten the upper hand in the bigger competition between them.	35.6%	20.2%
87	'Manibugho'	June 17, 2016	Can Serena finally tell who she really loves?	33%	17.5%
88	'Urong Sulong'	June 20, 2016	Gian Carlo takes a chance on winning Serena's heart by planning to serenade her, only to learn that Serena is not at home.	32.1%	17.4%
89	'Strategy'	June 21, 2016	Gian Carlo is not giving up and a song might help him win Serena's heart.	31.4%	19.3%
90	'If Only'	June 22, 2016	Gian Carlo and Tenten's rivalry reaches its limit when Gian Carlo punches Tenten for attempting to kiss Serena.	34.1%	18.2%
91	'Kaba Feels'	June 23, 2016	Tenten's sudden leave angers Serena, until news that he may be badly hurt in a bus accident reaches Manibugho.	35%	18%
92	'HHWW'	June 24, 2016	The bus accident makes Serena realize what she really feels for Tenten.	32.6%	17.2%
93	'The Decision'	June 27, 2016	Tenten and Serena are now back in each other's arms.	30.8%	17.9%
94	'Just Say Yes'	June 28, 2016	Tenten and Serena prove that love is sweeter the second time around.	31.5%	20.1%
95	'Fight For It'	June 29, 2016	Desperate Gian Carlo finds a way to stop Serena from marrying Tenten.	30.7%	18.5%
96	'Target'	June 30, 2016	Winning Serena's heart may cost Tenten his life.	29.9%	19.3%
Average				33.7%	18.3%

==== July ====
Episode No.	Title	Date Aired	Synopsis	Average audience share	
Episode No.	Title	Date Aired	Synopsis	Kantar Media-TNS Nationwide	AGB Nielsen Mega Manila
97	'Warning'	July 1, 2016	Gian Carlo begins his plan of revenge.	28%	18.7%
98	'Gut Feeling'	July 4, 2016	The Urtolas and the Ibarras find time to unwind despite the threat posed by the De Lucas.	31%	18.8%
99	'Sacrifice'	July 5, 2016	Binggoy, Tenten, and Serena's trip takes an unexpected turn when their vehicle swerves off the road after dodging a fast approaching truck.	31.1%	17%
100	'Bye Binggoy'	July 6, 2016	Amid his grief, Tenten grows more resentful of Luciana upon learning that she manipulated Binggoy to break him and Serena apart.	31.7%	18.9%
101	'Blackmail'	July 7, 2016	Tenten is consumed by anger when Serena admits Gian Carlo's possible involvement in Binggoy's death.	32.7%	20.3%
102	'Ultimatum'	July 8, 2016	Gian Carlo pressures Serena into marrying him in exchange for Tenten's safety.	30.2%	19.9%
103	'Wedding Prep'	July 11, 2016	Just when everything is set for the wedding, Serena receives an unexpected call from Gian Carlo.	30.6%	20%
104	'Dilemma'	July 12, 2016	Serena finds herself in a dilemma when Gian Carlo vows to hurt her loved ones if she decides to marry Tenten.	31.6%	19.8%
105	'Wedding Day'	July 13, 2016	On the day of her wedding, Serena makes the ultimate sacrifice.	34.1%	21%
106	'Change Is Coming'	July 14, 2016	Vivian Dubois, an incredibly wealthy woman, introduces herself as Tenten's biological mother.	36.7%	21.8%

=== Chapter 3 ===
==== July ====
Episode No.	Title	Date Aired	Synopsis	Average audience share	
Episode No.	Title	Date Aired	Synopsis	Kantar Media-TNS Nationwide	AGB Nielsen Mega Manila
107	'Forever Is Not Enough'	July 15, 2016	After a year, Tenten appears before Serena as the new owner of Villa Marchesa.	35.7%	22%
108	'Changed Man'	July 18, 2016	Taps and Dodoy decide to bring Tenten to the Marchesa farm, taking Serena by surprise.	35.9%	21.7%
109	'Pusong Bato'	July 19, 2016	Serena sees how much Tenten has changed, while Luciana and Tenten meet once again.	35.7%	22.5%
110	'Arrival'	July 20, 2016	While Tenten plots his revenge on Luciana, Serena returns to the Philippines.	35.9%	21.9%
111	'Power Play'	July 21, 2016	Serena persistently chases after Tenten, while Luciana tries to make amends with Roberto.	36.2%	22.3%
112	'Fighting Spirit'	July 22, 2016	Tenten refuses to listen to what Serena has to say.	34.2%	22.3%
113	'Patigasan'	July 25, 2016	After reconciling with Roberto, Luciana decides to go back to the Philippines and face Tenten's charges.	35%	20.4%
114	'Aminan'	July 26, 2016	Serena and Tenten finally air out their true feelings toward each other.	35.4%	21.0%
115	'Connivance'	July 27, 2016	Serena resolves to convince Tenten that Luciana had nothing to do with Binggoy's death.	33.4%	18.8%
116	'Lost And Found'	July 28, 2016	Vivian meets with Luciana to talk about Tenten.	34.1%	20.9%
117	'Sabotage'	July 29, 2016	Tenten worries about River's interest in Serena.	35.6%	20.1%
Average				33.6%	20.4%

==== August ====
Episode No.	Title	Date Aired	Synopsis	Average audience share	
Episode No.	Title	Date Aired	Synopsis	Kantar Media-TNS Nationwide	AGB Nielsen Mega Manila
118	'The Game Plan'	August 1, 2016	Tables are turned as Tenten now needs something from Serena, who makes sure not to go easy on him.	34.1%	21.1%
119	'Ex Deal'	August 2, 2016	Tenten makes a deal with Serena in exchange for the Villa Marchesa.	34.3%	21.5%
120	'Payback'	August 3, 2016	Tenten tries his best to talk to Serena.	34.7%	20.9%
121	'True Feelings'	August 4, 2016	Serena finally agrees to meet up with Tenten.	35.0%	20.9%
122	'Paranoid'	August 5, 2016	Tenten could not take his mind off Serena and River's date.	33.7%	19.6%
123	'Operation 1010'	August 8, 2016	In order to bring Serena and Tenten back together, the Ibarras launch Operation 1010.	33.6%	21.8%
124	'Sabwatan'	August 9, 2016	Tenten denies any involvement in the threat on Luciana's life.	36.9%	23.3%
125	'Parents Trap'	August 10, 2016	The Ibarras, Uge, and Roberto proceed with their plan to bring Serena and Tenten back together.	35.8%	22.8%
126	'Pa-fall'	August 11, 2016	Alice and Uge's surprise for Serena finally arrives, while Luciana meets with her harasser.	35.3%	22%
127	'Family Day'	August 12, 2016	Tenten and Serena finally reconcile.	33.6%	21%
128	'Truth'	August 15, 2016	The vacation leaves a hopeful note to Tenten and Serena, while Luciana's trial comes to a close.	30.9%	20.6%
129	'Hot Seat'	August 16, 2016	On the witness stand, Serena reveals her true feelings for Tenten.	33.5%	21.1%
130	'Busted'	August 17, 2016	Tenten and Serena discover something about Vivian and Hannah.	33.8%	20.6%
131	'Lure'	August 18, 2016	Keeping Serena's hunch in mind, Tenten gets closer to Hannah to get to know more about her.	33.2%	22.2%
132	'At Last'	August 19, 2016	Tenten finally discovers Hannah's secret.	33.3%	20.2%
133	'The Big Surprise'	August 22, 2016	While Tenten is busy planning a big surprise for Serena, Favio makes sure to expose an even bigger revelation.	34.4%	22.3%
134	'Expose'	August 23, 2016	Tenten's sweet surprise for Serena turns sour when a secret is revealed.	35.2%	23%
135	'Secret No More'	August 24, 2016	Tenten finally learns the truth about his identity.	34.4%	21.9%
136	'May Forever Ba Talaga'	August 25, 2016	Tenten finally decides to follow his heart.	35.2%	21.9%
137	'The Most Beautiful Finale'	August 26, 2016	Together, Tenten and Serena face a new chapter in their lives.	37.7%	23.6%
Average				34.4%	21.7%
