= List of Langit Lupa episodes =

Langit Lupa (Lit: Heaven Earth) is a 2016 Philippine family drama television series directed by Carlo Po Artillaga and Myla Ajero-Gaite, starring Yesha Camile and Xia Vigor. The series premiered on ABS-CBN's PrimeTanghali noontime block and worldwide on The Filipino Channel from November 28, 2016 to April 28, 2017 replacing Be My Lady.

== Episodes ==
#	Title	Official Hashtag	Original air date
1	Friendship Begins	#LLFriendshipBegins	November 28, 2016
2	Friendship Over	#LLFriendshipOver	November 29, 2016
3	Two Princesses	#LLTwoPrincesses	November 30, 2016
4	First Day of School	#LLFirstDayofSchool	December 1, 2016
5	Pencil's New Home	#LLPencil'sNewHome	December 2, 2016
6	Finding Pencil	#LLFindingPencil	December 5, 2016
7	Pencil or Yoyo	#LLPencilorYoyo	December 6, 2016
8	New Friend	#LLNewFriend	December 7, 2016
9	Haunted House	#LLHauntedHouse	December 8, 2016
10	Family First	#LLFamilyFirst	December 9, 2016
11	Get Well Soon	#LLGetWellSoon	December 12, 2016
12	Surprise	#LLSurprise	December 13, 2016
13	Welcome Home	#LLWelcomeHome	December 14, 2016
14	Struggle	#LLStruggle	December 15, 2016
15	Reunited	#LLReunited	December 16, 2016
16	Memories	#LLMemories	December 19, 2016
17	Secrets	#LLSecrets	December 20, 2016
18	Escape	#LLEscape	December 21, 2016
19	Arrival	#LLArrival	December 22, 2016
20	Cover Up	#LLCoverUp	December 23, 2016
21	Celebration	#LLCelebration	December 26, 2016
22	Happy Birthday	#LLHappyBirthday	December 27, 2016
23	Wish	#LLWish	December 28, 2016
24	Goodbye	#LLGoodbye	December 29, 2016
25	Unexpected	#LLUnexpected	December 30, 2016
26	Sorry	#LLSorry	January 2, 2017
27	New Beginnings	#LLNewBeginnings	January 3, 2017
28	Trap	#LLTrap	January 4, 2017
29	Competition	#LLCompetition	January 5, 2017
30	The Take Over	#LLTheTakeOver	January 6, 2017
31	Lean On Me	#LLLeanOnMe	January 9, 2017
32	Friendly Advice	#LLFriendlyAdvice	January 10, 2017
33	Courage	#LLCourage	January 11, 2017
34	Bargaining	#LLBargaining	January 12, 2017
35	Saving Grance	#LLSavingGrance	January 13, 2017
36	New Chapter	#LLNewChapter	January 16, 2017
37	Neighbors	#LLNeighbors	January 17, 2017
38	To The Rescue	#LLToTheRescue	January 18, 2017
39	Reconciliation	#LLReconciliation	January 19, 2017
40	Starting Over	#LLStartingOver	January 20, 2017
41	Hopeful	#LLHopeful	January 23, 2017
42	Achievement Unlocked	#LLAchievementUnlocked	January 24, 2017
43	Relationship Goals	#LLRelationshipGoals	January 25, 2017
44	Field Trip	#LLFieldTrip	January 26, 2017
45	Heartaches	#LLHeartaches	January 27, 2017
46	Lost and Found	#LLLostandFound	January 30, 2017
47	Family Day	#LLFamilyDay	January 31, 2017
48	Confrontation	#LLConfrontation	February 1, 2017
49	Free Taste	#LLFreeTaste	February 2, 2017
50	Surprise Visit	#LLSupriseVisit	February 3, 2017
51	Special Visitor	#LLSpecialVisitor	February 6, 2017
52	Agreement	#LLAgreement	February 7, 2017
53	Daddy Dearest	#LLDaddyDearest	February 8, 2017
54	Complete Family	#LLCompleteFamily	February 9, 2017
55	Happy Birthday Princess	#LLHappyBirthdayPrincess	February 10, 2017
56	Make It Up To You	#LLMakeItUpToYou	February 13, 2017
57	Bigger Celebration	#LLBiggerCelebration	February 14, 2017
58	Family Picture	#LLFamilyPicture	February 15, 2017
59	Dognapped	#LLDognapped	February 16, 2017
60	Invite	#LLInvite	February 17, 2017
61	Valentine Date	#LLValentineDate	February 20, 2017
62	Bully	#LLBully	February 21, 2017
63	Shout Out To My Ex	#LLShoutOutToMyEx	February 22, 2017
64	Trixies Revenge	#LLTrixiesRevenge	February 23, 2017
65	Problem Child	#LLProblemChild	February 24, 2017
66	Reward	#LLReward	February 27, 2017
67	Homework	#LLHomework	February 28, 2017
68	All Walks of Life	#LLAllWalksofLife	March 1, 2017
69	New Bestfriend	#LLNewBestfriend	March 2, 2017
70	Choices	#LLChoices	March 3, 2017
71	Isadora Strikes Again	#LLIsadoraStrikesAgain	March 6, 2017
72	The Royal Rumble	#LLTheRoyalRumble	March 7, 2017
73	Tangled	#LLTangled	March 8, 2017
74	FingersCrossed	#LLFingersCrossed	March 9, 2017
75	Family Portrait	#LLFamilyPortrait	March 10, 2017
76	Click	#LLClick	March 13, 2017
77	Summer	#LLSummer	March 14, 2017
78	Waves	#LLWaves	March 15, 2017
79	Fun Under The Sun	#LLFunUnderTheSun	March 16, 2017
80	Save Me	#LLSave	March 17, 2017
81	Aftermath	#LLAftermath	March 20, 2017
82	Turning Tables	#LLTurningTables	March 21, 2017
83	Stalker	#LLStalker	March 22, 2017
84	For You I Will	#LLForYouIWill	March 23, 2017
85	Bad Habits	#LLHabits	March 24, 2017
86	Vitamin C	#LLVitaminC	March 27, 2017
87	Heart Burn	#LLHeartBurn	March 28, 2017
88	Truth Hurts	#LLTruthHurts	March 29, 2017
89	Punishment	#LLPunishment	March 30, 2017
90	Take It Or Leave It	#LLTakeOrLeaveIt	March 31, 2017
91	Shooting Star	#LLShootingStar	April 3, 2017
92	Fix You	#LLFixYou	April 4, 2017
93	Lifeline	#LLLifeline	April 5, 2017
94	Its Complicated	#LLItsComplicated	April 6, 2017
95	Where Is Daddy	#LLWhereIsDaddy	April 7, 2017
96	Blackmail	#LLBlackmail	April 10, 2017
97	Father Figure	#LLFatherFigure	April 11, 2017
98	Against All Odds	#LLAgainstAllOdds	April 12, 2017
99	Betrayal	LLBetrayal	April 17, 2017
100	Morality Bites	#LLMoralityBites	April 18, 2017
101	Truth Revealed	#FFTruthRevealed	April 19, 2017
102	Forgiveness	#LLForgiveness	April 20, 2017
103	Farewell	#LLFarewell	April 21, 2017
104	Letting Go	#LLLettingGo	April 24, 2017
105	Acceptance	#LLAcceptance	April 25, 2017
106	Moving	#LLMoving	April 26, 2017
107	Happiest Place On Earth	#LLHappiestPlaceOnEarth	April 27, 2017
108	The Cutest Finale	#LLTheCutestFinale	April 28, 2017
