= Heart Skips a Beat (disambiguation) =

"Heart Skips a Beat" is a 2010 song by Olly Murs from the album In Case You Didn't Know.

Heart Skips a Beat may also refer to:

- "Heart Skips a Beat", a 2011 song by Lenka from the album Two
- "Heart Skips a Beat", a 2012 song by Toy from the eponymous album Toy
- "Heart Skips a Beat", a 2014 song by Little Hurricane
- "The Heart Skips A Beat", a 2015 TV episode of Pangako Sa 'Yo

== See also ==
- The dictionary definition of skip a beat at Wiktionary
- Skipped beat (disambiguation), including the cardiac medical condition
- The Beat That My Heart Skipped (French: De battre mon cœur s'est arrêté), a 2005 French noir film
- "My Heart Skips a Beat", a 1964 single by Buck Owens
- "My Heart Skips a Beat", a 1989 song by The Cover Girls from the album We Can't Go Wrong
- "My Heart Skips a Beat", a 1978 song by Duke Jordan from the album Duke's Artistry
- "Heart Skipped a Beat", a 2009 song by the xx from the eponymous album xx
