= Corpus Delicti (film) =

2017 Philippine action film

- Directed by: Toto Natividad
- Screenplay by: Jerry Gracio
- Story by: Toto Natividad; Jerry Gracio
- Produced by: Richard Reynante; Malou N. Santos; Charo Santos-Concio
- Starring: Xian Lim; Marco Gumabao; Vin Abrenica; Raymond Bagatsing
- Cinematography: Elmer Despa
- Edited by: Charliebebs Gohetia
- Music by: Emerzon Texon
- Production company: CineBro
- Distributed by: Star Cinema
- Release date: January 18, 2017
- Running time: 83 minutes
- Country: Philippines
- Languages: Filipino; English

Corpus Delicti is a 2017 Filipino action crime film co-written and directed by Toto Natividad. The film stars Xian Lim, Marco Gumabao, Vin Abrenica and Raymond Bagatsing.

== Plot ==
A young police officer (Xian Lim) is put to the test when his next case is too close to home. He sets on a dangerous mission to track down the murderer who killed his brother.

== Cast ==
- Xian Lim as SPO2 Mark Mondejar
- Marco Gumabao as Robin Mondejar
- Vin Abrenica as PO1 Julius Arcega
- Shamaine Buencamino as Lydia Mondejar
- Loren Burgos as Rose Martinez
- Franchesca Floirendo as Sam Alvarez
- Raymond Bagatsing as Bert Corpuz
- Oliver Aquino as Noel Corpuz
- Robin Tapeno as Benzon
- Richard Manabat as warden
- Migui Moreno as PO2 Santos
- Tom Olivar as P/Supt. Federico N. Alvis
- Dido dela Paz as Timbol
- Leon Miguel as Domingo "Dodong" Abad
