= Dolce Amore =

Philippine television series

- Title card
- Also known as: Sweet Love
- Genre: Romance; Comedy; Melodrama
- Created by: ABS-CBN Studios; Olivia M. Lamasan; Henry King Quitain
- Developed by: ABS-CBN Studios; Malou N. Santos; Des M. de Guzman
- Written by: Mark Duane Angos; Enrique S. Villasis; Mary Pearl Urtola
- Directed by: Mae Czarina Cruz-Alviar; Richard I. Arellano; Cathy Garcia-Molina
- Creative director: Johnny Delos Santos
- Starring: Liza Soberano; Enrique Gil
- Opening theme: "Your Love" by Juris
- Ending theme: "Tuo Amore" (Your Love) by Michael Pangilinan
- Composer: Alamid
- Country of origin: Philippines
- Original languages: Filipino; English; Italian
- No. of seasons: 3
- No. of episodes: 137 (list of episodes)

Production
- Executive producers: Carlo Katigbak; Cory Vidanes; Laurenti Dyogi; Malou Santos; Des De Guzman
- Producers: Myleen H. Ongkiko; Marie Kris Macas
- Production locations: Philippines; Italy
- Cinematography: Alex Espatero; A.B. Garcia
- Editors: Jeric Hernandez; Joshua Ducasen
- Running time: 30-45 minutes
- Production company: Star Creatives

Original release
- Network: ABS-CBN
- Release: February 15 – August 26, 2016

Dolce Amore (English: Sweet Love) is a 2016 Philippine television drama romantic series broadcast by ABS-CBN. Directed by Mae Cruz-Alviar, Cathy Garcia-Molina and Richard I. Arellano, it stars Liza Soberano and Enrique Gil. It aired on the network's Primetime Bida line up and worldwide on TFC from February 15 to August 26, 2016, replacing Pangako sa 'Yo and was replaced by Till I Met You.

This series was streaming online on YouTube.

== Synopsis ==
Serena Marchesa (Liza Soberano) is a young and beautiful Filipina who was adopted by rich Italian parents when she was an infant. When she finds herself stuck in an arranged marriage, she runs away to the Philippines, a country she has been fascinated by since she was little from the stories she heard from her Filipina nanny and the stories that her Penpal friend from the Philippines has been talking about. There, she meets and falls in love with her Penpal friend, Simon, also known as Tenten (Enrique Gil), a poor and hardworking adopted boy from Tondo who takes unconventional jobs for his family.

== Cast and characters ==
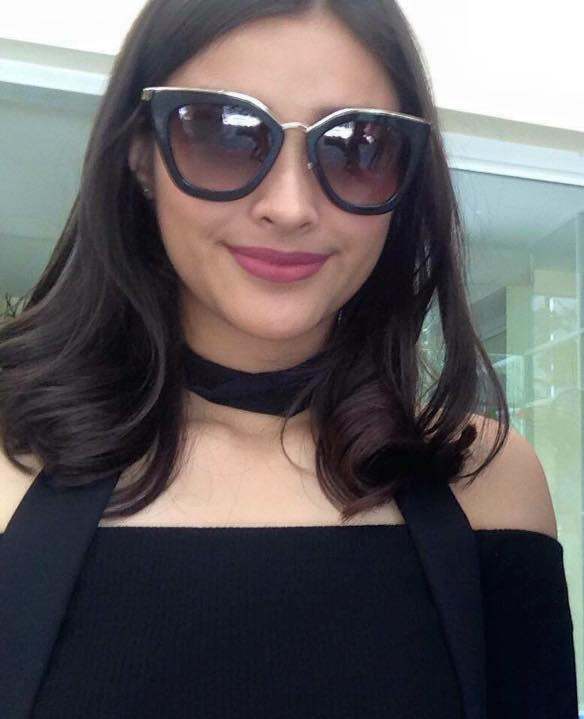
Liza Soberano portrays Serena Marchesa / Monica Urtola

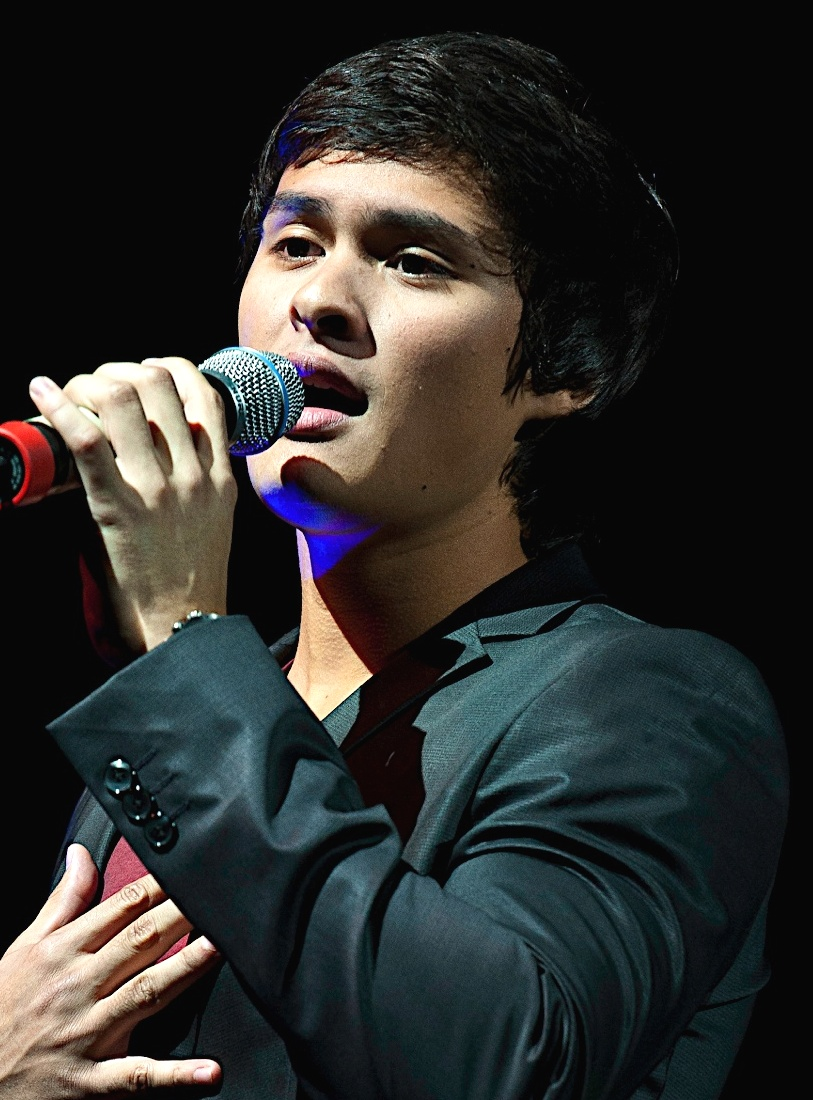
Matteo Guidicelli portrays Giancarlo de Luca

=== Main cast ===
- Liza Soberano as Serena Marchesa / Monica Urtola-Marchesa

- Hannah Lopez Vito as young Serena / Monica

She is a Filipina who was adopted by a rich Italian man as an infant. She is raised as a 'princess', with several servants around her at all times, including a Filipina nanny. Despite her upbringing, she longs for a simple life, which her mother disapproves of. She is fascinated by the Philippines, from the stories she hears from her nanny and from her father who always speaks to her in Tagalog and later on reveals her true parentage. Attempting to escape her arranged marriage to her best friend, she travels to the Philippines to search for a young billionaire who can save her family's company. But when she fell in love with Tenten, Luciana wants to break them apart, as she knows that the Ibarra family that could make their lives worsen. After Binggoy kidnaps Serena, Simon tries to save her but Serena does not believe Simon so they got on an accident, Serena have amnesia and her family went to Italy. When Serena find out the truth about Giancarlo's death, Serena got angry at Tenten, as he is the mastermind for killing Giancarlo. In the end, she married Tenten and lived happily with each other.

- Enrique Gil as Simon Vicente "Tenten" Ibarra

- Marc Santiago as young Tenten

He is a sickly orphan who lived in an orphanage before he was adopted by a family. They lost everything after he falls ill, and he had to start taking unconventional jobs to get their house back. He meets Serena while doing one of his jobs, as a call boy, under the impression that she was hiring him. He is angry at Giancarlo, as he know the involvement behind his older brother's death. Their lives with Serena turned tables, as he got rich from the help of Vivian, a wealthy woman who only poses as his real mother. But when a secret has revealed by Favio to the Ibarra, Marchesa, and Urtola families, he got furious to Luciana due to her secrets about Binggoy's death. He later gets married with Serena after their struggles within their families.

=== Supporting cast ===
- Matteo Guidicelli as Giancarlo de Luca

He is Serena's childhood best friend from Italy. He seemed to be madly in love with Serena that he will go to any lengths to make her marry him. Tenten's rival for loving Serena. He is the alleged mastermind for killing Binggoy, together with his uncle. He was later killed by Tenten's henchmen at the wedding day with Serena. But at the party for the wedding anniversary of Tenten's adoptive parents, it was revealed that Luciana was responsible for the deaths of Binggoy and Giancarlo from Favio's video.

- Cherie Gil as Luciana Marchesa

Serena's Italian adoptive mother and Tenten's biological mother. She was initially against the adoption of Serena, which her husband decided on without her consent. She also doesn't approve of Serena's wishes to live a simple life because she believes "the worst thing in life is to be ordinary". She is the one being revealed by Favio about her attempt to kill Tenten leading to Binggoy's death. Soon after, she asked forgiveness to her husband, Serena, and the Ibarra family.

- Sunshine Cruz as Alice Urtola

Uge's wife and the biological mother of Serena, also a nurse and refugee in the fictional country of Askovia. She was separated from her husband and two daughters after an explosion during a war in the 1990s.

- Edgar Mortiz as Ruben "Dodoy" Ibarra

Tenten's adoptive father and Taps' husband.

- Rio Locsin as Pilita "Taps" Ibarra

Dodoy's wife and a cook in the orphanage, where Tenten was in and eventually became Tenten's adoptive mother.

- Kean Cipriano as Alvin "Binggoy" Ibarra

Dodoy and Taps' eldest son and Tenten's adoptive older brother. He got into an accident and suddenly died after he fell down with his jeepney to save Tenten and Serena.

- Ruben Maria Soriquez as Roberto Marchesa

Serena's adoptive Italian father who longed to have a child which was impossible for him and his barren wife. He raised her as his own and taught her about the Filipino culture, often speaking to her and telling her stories in Tagalog, since he himself was also raised by a Filipino nanny.

- Andrew E. as Eugene "Uge" Urtola

Alice's husband and Serena's biological father. He was separated from his wife and children in the war of Askovia.

- Sue Ramirez as Angela "Angel" Urtola

Serena's biological older sister. She was separated from her sister after an explosion during a war in Askovia.

- Alvin Anson as Favio De Luca

The uncle of Giancarlo who plans vengenance for killing his nephew.

- Tetchie Agbayani as Vivian Dubois

Luciana's best friend and the one who poses as Tenten's mother, even though Luciana is his real mother.

- Joseph Marco as River Cruz

Serena's co-worker at his office who suddenly got them into a relationship, wherein Tenten gets jealous at him.

- Franchesca Floirendo as Hannah Conde

Favio's acquaintance for killing Tenten.

=== Extended cast ===
- Frenchie Dy as Imelda "Yaya Melds" Dalisay

Serena's nanny at the Marchesa's mansion.

- Jeffrey Tam as Jeijei

Tenten's best friend.

- Matteo Tosi as Silvio De Luca

Giancarlo's father.

- Rommel Padilla as Ricardo "Carding" Dalisay

Melds' loving husband.

- Buboy Villar as Franco

Giancarlo's tour guide, also a friend of him and Serena.

- Hannah Ledesma as Sarah

Tenten's ex-lover whom Serena got jealous of.

- Francine Prieto as Claudia Buenaventura
- Laurence Mossman as Señor Mossman
- Eslove Briones as Marky
- James Lobo as Mark
- Ana Feleo as Adelina
- Boom Labrusca as Roger
- Earl Ignacio as Leo
- Vangie Labalan as Lola B
- Miguel Faustman as Lolo Fio
- Eric Nicolas as Lapid
- Bituin Escalante as Lota
- Hyubs Azarcon as Buboy
- Gilette Sandico as Glenda
- Jana Dangcalan as Connie
- Noel Trinidad as Daddy Lo Cruz
- Lollie Mara as Mommy La Cruz
- John Christian Gascon as Frank Urtula

=== Guest cast ===
- Calvin Abueva as The Beast Basketball Player
- Beau Belga as Extra Rice Basketball Player
- Paulo Hubalde as Basketball Player
- Callalily as Binggoy's band
- Maxine Eigenmann as young Luciana
- AJ Dee as young Roberto
- CX Navarro as Motmot
- Bobby Ray Parks Jr. as Basketball Player
- Ian Veneracion as priest

== Production ==
After the success of Forevermore, Liza Soberano and Enrique Gil were once again paired up, a year later. They are joined by rapper Andrew E., who made his teleserye debut in ABS-CBN through the show. The show also marked the return of veteran actress Cherie Gil to ABS-CBN, playing the role of Luciana Marchesa. Aside from Gil, Edgar Mortiz also returned to acting, almost 10 years after his last show. The show was shot in the Philippines and in Italy. Filming in Italy began in early December 2015, when the cast headed to Rome to shoot some scenes. Scenes were also shot in other Italian cities, including Bologna, Florence and Venice. Filipino-Italian actor Ruben Maria Soriquez, who plays Roberto Marchesa, had to help the cast with language.

== Episodes ==
Season	Episodes	Originally released	
Season	Episodes	First released	Last released
1	53	February 15, 2016	April 29, 2016
2	53	May 2, 2016	July 14, 2016
3	31	July 15, 2016	August 26, 2016

== Reception ==
=== Critical response ===
Just the start of the pilot week, people were fascinated about the plot of its first episode titled, "Sweet Beginning". According to spot.ph, "LizQuen's new telenovela doesn't seem like your typical telenovela, which is kind of a good thing." Also they added, "We watched the first episode to see if the show can fill the Forevermore-shaped role in our hearts, and we weren't disappointed."

When the story is about to fold its storytelling. Nestor U. Torre of the Philippine Daily Inquirer evaluated the plus and minus effects it's had on its key players. On Cherie Gil "All too often, other tisoy stars stumble and fumble when they portray non-Filipinos, but Cherie's approximation of Liza Soberano's Italian foster mother inDolce Amore is more convincing." While on Ruben Maria Soriquez as Liza's dad "has also more than passed muster, so we hope to see him on local screens again after the show's conclusion. As for second-lead player "Matteo Guidicelli's own portrayal of Liza's Italian best friend and most ardent suitor, the young actor similarly did well. Matteo's character took a disturbing and even shockingly "darker" tone." This gave him an opportunity to play his "villain" card for attention-calling contrast, and he ended up as more than just a "third leg" in the series' stellar support structure."

As for the show’s leads, "Liza Soberano is clearly the biggest beneficiary of its success. Her combination of telegenic beauty, youth, charisma and increasing stellar “confidence” has made her the young-adult female star du jour and on the local TV screen. To underscore and challenge her stellar promise, “Dolce Amore” gave her many different moods and styles to vivify—making her thespic task more difficult, but also enhancing its impact and success." In instructive contrast, "Enrique Gil hasn't done as swimmingly, shiningly well because he's generally opted to play it appealingly cute and boy-next-door for too much, too long in the show's run. Much later in the series, Enrique did get a chance to show what else he could do, when his character was made to turn hard and rich and cold-hearted."

== Reruns ==
The show aired reruns on Jeepney TV from September 4 to December 8, 2017 (replacing the reruns of On the Wings of Love); September 23, 2018 to May 12, 2019 (replacing the reruns of Forevermore); August 7 to November 10, 2023 (replacing the reruns of La Luna Sangre); and February 3 to August 8, 2025 (also aired on ALLTV, replacing the reruns of Pangako sa 'Yo 2015 and was replaced by the reruns of The Legal Wife).

It also aired reruns on Kapamilya Channel's Kapamilya Gold afternoon block, Kapamilya Online Live, and A2Z's Zuper Hapon from May 3 to November 12, 2021 (replacing Bagong Umaga and was replaced by the reruns of Love Thy Woman). The series was also made available for streaming on Netflix in the Philippines starting December 7, 2021.

== Awards and nominations ==
Year	Award	Category	Recipient(s)	Result
2016	Parangal Paulinian	Dramang Pantelebisyon	Dolce Amore	Won
2016	6th EdukCircle Awards	Drama Actress of the Year	Liza Soberano	Nominated
2016	6th EdukCircle Awards	Drama Actor of the Year	Enrique Gil	Nominated
2016	ALTA Media Icon Awards	Most Influential Female TV Personality	Liza Soberano	Won
2016	30th PMPC Star Awards for Television	Best Primetime Drama Series	Dolce Amore	Nominated
2016	30th PMPC Star Awards for Television	Best Drama Actor	Enrique Gil	Nominated
2016	30th PMPC Star Awards for Television	Best Drama Actress	Liza Soberano	Nominated
2016	30th PMPC Star Awards for Television	Best Drama Supporting Actress	Cherie Gil	Nominated
2016	30th PMPC Star Awards for Television	Best Drama Supporting Actress	Sunshine Cruz	Nominated
2016	30th PMPC Star Awards for Television	Best Drama Supporting Actor	Matteo Guidicelli	Nominated
2016	2nd Illumine Innovation Awards for Television	Most Innovative TV Actress	Liza Soberano	Won
2016	2nd Illumine Innovation Awards for Television	Most Innovative TV Loveteam	Liza Soberano and Enrique Gil	Won
2017	3rd Aral Parangal Awards of the Young Educators Summit	Best Drama Actress	Liza Soberano	Won
2017	4th Paragala: The Central Luzon Media Awards	Best Television Actress	Liza Soberano	Won
2017	4th Paragala: The Central Luzon Media Awards	Best Television Actor	Enrique Gil	Nominated
2017	4th LPU UmalohokJuan Awards	Television Actress of the Year	Liza Soberano	Won
2017	Centro Escolar University Mass Communication Awards for Media and the Arts	Excellence Award in the Field of Entertainment TV	Liza Soberano and Enrique Gil	Won

== Ratings ==
KANTAR MEDIA NATIONAL TV RATINGS (8:45PM PST)
PILOT EPISODE	FINALE EPISODE	PEAK	AVERAGE	SOURCE
35.6%	37.7%	37.7%	37.0%	

== International broadcast ==
The series was aired in Malaysia (dubbed into Malay language) on Astro Prima and Astro Maya HD, started from September until December 2017.

== See also ==
- List of programs broadcast by ABS-CBN
- List of ABS-CBN Studios original drama series
- List of programs broadcast by Jeepney TV
