= List of Pangako Sa 'Yo (2015 TV series) episodes =

Pangako sa 'Yo (lit. 'Promise to You' / English: The Promise) is a 2015 television series and is a remake of the 2000 television series of the same name. The series is directed by Rory Quintos, Dado Lumibao and Olivia Lamasan and starring Kathryn Bernardo and Daniel Padilla with Jodi Sta. Maria, Angelica Panganiban and Ian Veneracion.

== Series overview ==
Season	Episodes	Originally released	
Season	Episodes	First released	Last released
1	125	May 25, 2015	November 13, 2015
2	65	November 16, 2015	February 12, 2016

== Episodes ==
=== Book 1: Season 1 (2015) ===
No. overall	No. in season	Title	Original air date	Kantar media rating (nationwide)
1	1	"Ang Unang Pag-ibig" (The First Love)	May 25, 2015	34.0%
2	2	"Ang Unang Pagtingin" (The First Sight)	May 26, 2015	32.2%
3	3	"Ang Pagsinta" (The Affection)	May 27, 2015	30.8%
4	4	"Ang Gabing Hindi Malilimutan" (The Unforgettable Night)	May 28, 2015	32.4%
5	5	"Ang Paninindigan" (The Commitment)	May 29, 2015	30.6%
6	6	"Ang Simula ng Kasinungalingan" (The Lies Begin)	June 1, 2015	32.4%
7	7	"Pananamantala" (The Exploitation)	June 2, 2015	31.9%
8	8	"Ang Pananagutan" (The Liability)	June 3, 2015	36.5%
9	9	"Ang Batas Ng Api" (The Wrath of the Oppressed)	June 4, 2015	36.4%
10	10	"Yna at Angelo" (Yna and Angelo)	June 5, 2015	37.2%
11	11	"Ang Pagtatagpo" (The Meeting)	June 8, 2015	35.5%
12	12	"Ang Kabayaran" (The Payment)	June 9, 2015	34.3%
13	13	"Ang Pagtatangka" (The Attempt)	June 10, 2015	34.0%
14	14	"Ang Madam At Si Yna" (Madam and Yna)	June 11, 2015	34.2%
15	15	"Ang Pagkakataon" (The Opportunity)	June 12, 2015	33.9%
16	16	"Casa Corazon" (Casa Corazon)	June 15, 2015	33.7%
17	17	"Ang Paglalapit" (The Approach)	June 16, 2015	33.8%
18	18	"Ang Pagdududa" (The Doubt)	June 17, 2015	35.1%
19	19	"Ang Hinala Kay Yna" (The Suspicion with Yna)	June 18, 2015	31.2%
20	20	"Ang Muling Paghaharap" (To Meet Again)	June 19, 2015	32.7%
21	21	"Bulag Bulagan" (To Turn A Blind Eye)	June 22, 2015	31.2%
22	22	"Ang Ganti Ni Angelo" (Angelo's Revenge)	June 23, 2015	32.2%
23	23	"Ang Pagsubok Kay Yna" (Yna's Challenge)	June 24, 2015	32.2%
24	24	"Ang Pagpaparamdam" (The Hint)	June 25, 2015	34.4%
25	25	"Ang Pagseselos" (The Jealousy)	June 26, 2015	33.0%
26	26	"Ang Pusong Lito" (Confused Heart)	June 29, 2015	35.2%
27	27	"Walang Sukuan" (No Surrender)	June 30, 2015	35.0%
28	28	"Para-paraan" (The Means)	July 1, 2015	35.7%
29	29	"Huwad na Katotohanan" (False Reality)	July 2, 2015	37.3%
30	30	"Ang Pagbawi" (The Recovery)	July 3, 2015	35.9%
31	31	"Ang Kasunduan" (The Agreement)	July 6, 2015	37.3%
32	32	"Ipagpatawad Mo" (To Forgive)	July 7, 2015	36.6%
33	33	"Chances" (Chances)	July 8, 2015	35.8%
34	34	"Unveil" (Unveil)	July 9, 2015	38.5%

==== July 2015 ====
Ep. #	Title	Nationwide Rating		Original Air Date	Timeslot Rank		Whole Day Rank	Source
28	Para-paraan "The Means"	35.7% Kantar Media	TBA	July 1, 2015	TBA	TBA	TBA	
29	Huwad na Katotohanan "False Reality"	37.3% Kantar Media	TBA	July 2, 2015	TBA	TBA	TBA	
30	Ang Pagbawi "The Recovery"	35.9% Kantar Media	TBA	July 3, 2015	TBA	TBA	TBA	
31	Ang Kasunduan "The Agreement"	37.3% Kantar Media	TBA	July 6, 2015	TBA	TBA	TBA	
32	Ipagpatawad Mo "To Forgive"	36.6% Kantar Media	TBA	July 7, 2015	TBA	TBA	TBA	
33	Chances	35.8% Kantar Media	34.5% AGB Nielsen	July 8, 2015	TBA	TBA	TBA	
34	Unveil	38.5% Kantar Media	37.0% AGB Nielsen	July 9, 2015	TBA	TBA	TBA	
35	Ang Simula Ng Ganti "The Beginning of Retribution"	36.3% Kantar Media	TBA	July 10, 2015	TBA	TBA	TBA	
36	Banta "Threat"	38.1% Kantar Media	TBA	July 13, 2015	TBA	TBA	TBA	
37	Misteryo "Mystery"	36.8% Kantar Media	35.6% AGB Nielsen	July 14, 2015	TBA	TBA	TBA	
38	First Move	35.4% Kantar Media	TBA	July 15, 2015	TBA	TBA	TBA	
39	Ang Pagbabalik "The Return"	36.3% Kantar Media	TBA	July 16, 2015	TBA	TBA	TBA	
40	Ibang Mundo "A Different World"	35.1% Kantar Media	TBA	July 17, 2015	TBA	TBA	TBA	
41	Ang Palabas "The Show"	35.4% Kantar Media	TBA	July 20, 2015	TBA	TBA	TBA	
42	Ang Pagbalik Ni Amor "Amor Returns"	34.4% Kantar Media	TBA	July 21, 2015	TBA	TBA	TBA	
43	Nahuhulog "Falling"	32.3% Kantar Media	31.0% AGB Nielsen	July 22, 2015	TBA	TBA	TBA	
44	Pasulyap-sulyap "Glimpses"	36.0% Kantar Media	32.5% AGB Nielsen	July 23, 2015	TBA	TBA	TBA	
45	Gusto Kita "I Like You"	34.2% Kantar Media	TBA	July 24, 2015	TBA	TBA	TBA	
46	Banta Ng Nakaraan "Threats from the Past"	32.8% Kantar Media	TBA	July 27, 2015	TBA	TBA	TBA	
47	Paghahanda "Preparation"	34.7% Kantar Media	TBA	July 28, 2015	TBA	TBA	TBA	
48	Hangarin "Desire"	34.1% Kantar Media	TBA	July 29, 2015	TBA	TBA	TBA	
49	Intensyon "Intention"	33.5% Kantar Media	TBA	July 30, 2015	TBA	TBA	TBA	
50	Harapan "Face-to-face"	33.9% Kantar Media	TBA	July 31, 2015	TBA	TBA	TBA	

==== August 2015 ====
Ep. #	Title	Nationwide Rating		Original Air Date	Timeslot Rank		Whole Day Rank	Source
51	Nalalapit "Forthcoming"	35.3% Kantar Media	TBA	August 3, 2015	TBA	TBA	TBA	
52	Muling Pagtatagpo "Meet Again"	34.2% Kantar Media	TBA	August 4, 2015	TBA	TBA	TBA	
53	Bea Bianca	34.3% Kantar Media	TBA	August 5, 2015	TBA	TBA	TBA	
54	Friendship	35.0% Kantar Media	TBA	August 6, 2015	TBA	TBA	TBA	
55	Selos "Jealousy"	33.5% Kantar Media	TBA	August 7, 2015	TBA	TBA	TBA	
56	Pagtuwid Sa Nakaraan "Fixing the Past"	32.1% Kantar Media	TBA	August 10, 2015	TBA	TBA	TBA	
57	Kakayanin "Making It Possible"	31.3% Kantar Media	TBA	August 11, 2015	TBA	TBA	TBA	
58	Sandigan "To Depend On"	32.6% Kantar Media	TBA	August 12, 2015	TBA	TBA	TBA	
59	Tulay "The Way"	33.5% Kantar Media	TBA	August 13, 2015	TBA	TBA	TBA	
60	Panliligaw "Courtship"	34.6% Kantar Media	TBA	August 14, 2015	TBA	TBA	TBA	
61	Kontra "Against"	31.7% Kantar Media	TBA	August 17, 2015	TBA	TBA	TBA	
62	Pananabik "Longing"	35.8% Kantar Media	TBA	August 18, 2015	TBA	TBA	TBA	
63	Lukso Ng Dugo "The Heart Skips A Beat"	39.7% Kantar Media	TBA	August 19, 2015	TBA	TBA	TBA	
64	Pagtatapat "Confession"	34.4 Kantar Media	TBA	August 20, 2015	TBA	TBA	TBA	
65	Patunay Ng Pag-Ibig "Proof of Love"	31.2% Kantar Media	TBA	August 21, 2015	TBA	TBA	TBA	
66	Unang Halik "First Kiss"	33.2% Kantar Media	TBA	August 24, 2015	TBA	TBA	TBA	
67	Sila Na "It's Official"	32.8% Kantar Media	TBA	August 25, 2015	TBA	TBA	TBA	
68	Pagpapakilala "Introduction"	32.2% Kantar Media	TBA	August 26, 2015	TBA	TBA	TBA	
69	Para Kay Angelo "For Angelo"	32.0% Kantar Media	TBA	August 27, 2015	TBA	TBA	TBA	
70	Balat Kayo "False Appearances"	32.0% Kantar Media	TBA	August 28, 2015	TBA	TBA	TBA	
71	Patibong "The Trap"	32.6% Kantar Media	TBA	August 31, 2015	TBA	TBA	TBA	

==== September 2015 ====
Ep. #	Title	Nationwide Rating		Original Air Date	Timeslot Rank		Whole Day Rank	Source
72	Hugot "Draw Out"	33.7% Kantar Media	TBA	September 1, 2015	TBA	TBA	TBA	
73	Unahan Sa Katotohanan "Fore The Truth"	31.4% Kantar Media	TBA	September 2, 2015	TBA	TBA	TBA	
74	Pagtatakip "Cover-up"	31.7% Kantar Media	TBA	September 3, 2015	TBA	TBA	TBA	
75	Kubli "Hidden"	31.4% Kantar Media	TBA	September 4, 2015	TBA	TBA	TBA	
76	Pangamba "Dread"	30.2% Kantar Media	TBA	September 7, 2015	TBA	TBA	TBA	
77	Bring It On	31.2% Kantar Media	TBA	September 8, 2015	TBA	TBA	TBA	
78	Dignidad "Dignity"	33.1% Kantar Media	TBA	September 9, 2015	TBA	TBA	TBA	
79	Laro "Game"	31.0% Kantar Media	TBA	September 10, 2015	TBA	TBA	TBA	
80	Sabog "Blast"	34.8% Kantar Media	TBA	September 11, 2015	TBA	TBA	TBA	
81	Tapatan "Set Straight"	30.2% Kantar Media	TBA	September 14, 2015	TBA	TBA	TBA	
82	Init Ng Damdamin "Warm Feelings"	32.2% Kantar Media	TBA	September 15, 2015	TBA	TBA	TBA	
83	Kampihan "Taking Sides"	31.4% Kantar Media	TBA	September 16, 2015	TBA	TBA	TBA	
84	Sanib Pwersa "Join Forces"	31.2% Kantar Media	TBA	September 17, 2015	TBA	TBA	TBA	
85	Tinik Sa Dibdib "Thorn In The Heart"	31.8% Kantar Media	TBA	September 18, 2015	TBA	TBA	TBA	
86	Gamitan "Use"	32.9% Kantar Media	TBA	September 21, 2015	TBA	TBA	TBA	
87	Sabotahe "Sabotage"	30.2% Kantar Media	TBA	September 22, 2015	TBA	TBA	TBA	
88	Balitagran "Reversal"	32.7% Kantar Media	TBA	September 23, 2015	TBA	TBA	TBA	
89	Akusasyon "Accusation"	33.5% Kantar Media	TBA	September 24, 2015	TBA	TBA	TBA	
90	Kapit "Holding On"	30.8% Kantar Media	TBA	September 25, 2015	TBA	TBA	TBA	
91	Lost	33.3% Kantar Media	TBA	September 28, 2015	TBA	TBA	TBA	
92	Coincidence	30.2% Kantar Media	TBA	September 29, 2015	TBA	TBA	TBA	
93	Hinala "Suspicion"	30.0% Kantar Media	TBA	September 30, 2015	TBA	TBA	TBA	

==== October 2015 ====
Ep. #	Title	Nationwide Rating		Original Air Date	Timeslot Rank		Whole Day Rank	Source
94	Game On	32.2% Kantar Media	TBA	October 1, 2015	TBA	TBA	TBA	
95	The Competition	34.5% Kantar Media	TBA	October 2, 2015	TBA	TBA	TBA	
96	Laban Ni Yna "Yna's Fight"	35.5% Kantar Media	TBA	October 5, 2015	TBA	TBA	TBA	
97	Bitiw "Let Go"	37.2% Kantar Media	TBA	October 6, 2015	TBA	TBA	TBA	
98	Paninindigan Ni Angelo "Angelo's Stand"	34.0% Kantar Media	TBA	October 7, 2015	TBA	TBA	TBA	
99	Breakup	34.9% Kantar Media	TBA	October 8, 2015	TBA	TBA	TBA	
100	Scandal	35.2% Kantar Media	TBA	October 9, 2015	TBA	TBA	TBA	
101	Sigaw Ng Puso "Cry of the Heart"	36.0% Kantar Media	TBA	October 12, 2015	TBA	TBA	TBA	
102	Hiwalay "Torn Apart"	35.3% Kantar Media	TBA	October 13, 2015	TBA	TBA	TBA	
103	Sayaw Ng Puso "Dance of the Heart"	34.7% Kantar Media	TBA	October 14, 2015	TBA	TBA	TBA	
104	Governor's Choice	35.3% Kantar Media	TBA	October 15, 2015	TBA	TBA	TBA	
105	Banggaan "Collision"	34.0% Kantar Media	TBA	October 16, 2015	TBA	TBA	TBA	
106	In Danger	33.2% Kantar Media	TBA	October 19, 2015	TBA	TBA	TBA	
107	Letting Go	33.2% Kantar Media	TBA	October 20, 2015	TBA	TBA	TBA	
108	Pagkabigo "Frustration"	32.6% Kantar Media	TBA	October 21, 2015	TBA	TBA	TBA	
109	Stuck	32.2% Kantar Media	TBA	October 22, 2015	TBA	TBA	TBA	
110	Happy Birthday, Angelo	31.7% Kantar Media	TBA	October 23, 2015	TBA	TBA	TBA	
111	Bawal Na Pagibig "Forbidden Love"	33.8% Kantar Media	TBA	October 26, 2015	TBA	TBA	TBA	
112	Ahas "Snake"	33.9% Kantar Media	TBA	October 27, 2015	TBA	TBA	TBA	
113	Enough	32.5% Kantar Media	TBA	October 28, 2015	TBA	TBA	TBA	
114	Diego	33.5% Kantar Media	TBA	October 29, 2015	TBA	TBA	TBA	
115	Paglantad "Expose"	34.5% Kantar Media	TBA	October 30, 2015	TBA	TBA	TBA	

==== November 2015 ====
Ep. #	Title	Nationwide Rating		Original Air Date	Timeslot Rank		Whole Day Rank	Source
116	Bwelta "Turnaround"	36.5% Kantar Media	TBA	November 2, 2015	TBA	TBA	TBA	
117	Bulag "Blind"	34.5% Kantar Media	TBA	November 3, 2015	TBA	TBA	TBA	
118	Linlang "Deceit"	35.0% Kantar Media	TBA	November 4, 2015	TBA	TBA	TBA	
119	Whistleblower	34.0% Kantar Media	TBA	November 5, 2015	TBA	TBA	TBA	
120	Pagyanig "Shake-up"	35.9% Kantar Media	TBA	November 6, 2015	TBA	TBA	TBA	
121	Pagtakas "Escape"	36.2% Kantar Media	TBA	November 9, 2015	TBA	TBA	TBA	
122	Caloy	35.9% Kantar Media	TBA	November 10, 2015	TBA	TBA	TBA	
123	Sabog "Blow-up"	38.6% Kantar Media	TBA	November 11, 2015	TBA	TBA	TBA	
124	Goodbye	35.6% Kantar Media	TBA	November 12, 2015	TBA	TBA	TBA	
125	Bagong Mundo "A New World"	36.0% Kantar Media	TBA	November 13, 2015	TBA	TBA	TBA	

=== Book Two ===
==== November 2015 ====
Ep. #	Title	Nationwide Rating		Original Air Date	Timeslot Rank		Whole Day Rank	Source
126	Begin Again "Magsimulang Muli"	35.1% Kantar Media	TBA	November 16, 2015	TBA	TBA	TBA	
127	Somewhere Down The Road	35.3% Kantar Media	TBA	November 17, 2015	TBA	TBA	TBA	
128	Dare	34.1% Kantar Media	TBA	November 18, 2015	TBA	TBA	TBA	
129	Pagbalik Ni Yna "Yna Returns"	34.3% Kantar Media	TBA	November 19, 2015	TBA	TBA	TBA	
130	Bilanggo "Prisoner"	34.6% Kantar Media	TBA	November 20, 2015	TBA	TBA	TBA	
131	Surprise	34.0% Kantar Media	TBA	November 23, 2015	TBA	TBA	TBA	
132	Pusong Ligaw "Lost Heart"	33.8% Kantar Media	TBA	November 24, 2015	TBA	TBA	TBA	
133	In Between	33.9% Kantar Media	TBA	November 25, 2015	TBA	TBA	TBA	
134	Palaban "Feisty"	32.4% Kantar Media	TBA	November 26, 2015	TBA	TBA	TBA	
135	Umaasa "Hopeful"	34.0% Kantar Media	TBA	November 27, 2015	TBA	TBA	TBA	
136	Unexpected	33% Kantar Media	TBA	November 30, 2015	TBA	TBA	TBA	

==== December 2015 ====
Ep. #	Title	Nationwide Rating		Original Air Date	Timeslot Rank		Whole Day Rank	Source
137	Magandang Gabi "Beautiful Evening"	35.6% Kantar Media	TBA	December 1, 2015	TBA	TBA	TBA	
138	Muli "Once Again"	33.8% Kantar Media	TBA	December 2, 2015	TBA	TBA	TBA	
139	Crossroads	34.9% Kantar Media	TBA	December 3, 2015	TBA	TBA	TBA	
140	Pakiusap "Appeal"	34.9% Kantar Media	TBA	December 4, 2015	TBA	TBA	TBA	
141	Taking Chances	33.2% Kantar Media	TBA	December 7, 2015	TBA	TBA	TBA	
142	Awkward	36.3% Kantar Media	TBA	December 8, 2015	TBA	TBA	TBA	
143	Freedom	34.5% Kantar Media	TBA	December 9, 2015	TBA	TBA	TBA	
144	Sulyap "Glance"	36% Kantar Media	TBA	December 10, 2015	TBA	TBA	TBA	
145	Homecoming	32.7% Kantar Media	TBA	December 11, 2015	TBA	TBA	TBA	
146	Pagkikita "Meeting"	32.3% Kantar Media	TBA	December 14, 2015	TBA	TBA	TBA	
147	Sa Totoo Lang "Admittedly"	29.9% Kantar Media	TBA	December 15, 2015	TBA	TBA	TBA	
148	Sa Piling Mo "Being With You"	30.1% Kantar Media	TBA	December 16, 2015	TBA	TBA	TBA	
149	Taguan "Hide-and-Seek"	30% Kantar Media	TBA	December 17, 2015	TBA	TBA	TBA	
150	Maling Akala "Misconstrue"	30.3% Kantar Media	TBA	December 18, 2015	TBA	TBA	TBA	
151	Just The Two Of Us	32.3% Kantar Media	TBA	December 21, 2015	TBA	TBA	TBA	
152	One Sweet Night	32.2% Kantar Media	TBA	December 22, 2015	TBA	TBA	TBA	
153	Yakap "Embrace"	30.8% Kantar Media	TBA	December 23, 2015	TBA	TBA	TBA	
154	Awakening	26.3% Kantar Media	TBA	December 24, 2015	TBA	TBA	TBA	
155	The Comeback	25.2% Kantar Media	TBA	December 25, 2015	TBA	TBA	TBA	
156	"Madam" Is Back	30.2% Kantar Media	TBA	December 28, 2015	TBA	TBA	TBA	
157	Bundle Of Joy	31.1% Kantar Media	TBA	December 29, 2015	TBA	TBA	TBA	
158	Lies	29.3% Kantar Media	TBA	December 30, 2015	TBA	TBA	TBA	
159	Sacrifices Of The Heart	24.2% Kantar Media	TBA	December 31, 2015	TBA	TBA	TBA	

==== January 2016 ====
Ep. #	Title	Nationwide Rating		Original Air Date	Timeslot Rank		Whole Day Rank	Source
160	Putok "Blast"	30.9% Kantar Media	TBA	January 1, 2016	TBA	TBA	TBA	
161	The Proposal	30.7% Kantar Media	TBA	January 4, 2016	TBA	TBA	TBA	
162	Wish	29.8% Kantar Media	TBA	January 5, 2016	TBA	TBA	TBA	
163	The Meeting	30.7% Kantar Media	TBA	January 6, 2016	TBA	TBA	TBA	
164	Despedida "The Send-off Party"	30.2% Kantar Media	TBA	January 7, 2016	TBA	TBA	TBA	
165	Bagay "Good Match"	30.2% Kantar Media	TBA	January 8, 2016	TBA	TBA	TBA	
166	Partners	28.7% Kantar Media	TBA	January 11, 2016	TBA	TBA	TBA	
167	Here Comes The Wife	34.9% Kantar Media	TBA	January 12, 2016	TBA	TBA	TBA	
168	The Great Pretender	31.1% Kantar Media	TBA	January 13, 2016	TBA	TBA	TBA	
169	Ganti "Revenge"	30.1% Kantar Media	TBA	January 14, 2016	TBA	TBA	TBA	
170	Maria Amor	29.6% Kantar Media	TBA	January 15, 2016	TBA	TBA	TBA	
171	Gamitan	30.9% Kantar Media	TBA	January 18, 2016	TBA	TBA	TBA	
172	Stranded	30.5% Kantar Media	TBA	January 19, 2016	TBA	TBA	TBA	
173	Ipaglaban Ang Pag-ibig "To Fight For Love"	30.5% Kantar Media	TBA	January 20, 2016	TBA	TBA	TBA	
174	Against The Odds	29.2% Kantar Media	TBA	January 21, 2016	TBA	TBA	TBA	
175	Para Kay Yna "For Yna"	33.6% Kantar Media	TBA	January 22, 2016	TBA	TBA	TBA	
176	Paalam, David "Farewell, David"	34.7% Kantar Media	TBA	January 25, 2016	TBA	TBA	TBA	
177	Pagluluksa "Mourning"	34.3% Kantar Media	TBA	January 26, 2016	TBA	TBA	TBA	
178	Sign	33% Kantar Media	TBA	January 27, 2016	TBA	TBA	TBA	
179	Pagtuklas "Discovery"	38.1% Kantar Media	TBA	January 28, 2016	TBA	TBA	TBA	
180	Nagbabaga "Smouldering"	31.6% Kantar Media	TBA	January 29, 2016	TBA	TBA	TBA	

==== February 2016 ====
Ep. #	Title	Nationwide Rating		Original Air Date	Timeslot Rank		Whole Day Rank	Source
181	Pangako Ng Katotohanan "The Promise of the Truth"	38.5% Kantar Media	TBA	February 1, 2016	TBA	TBA	TBA	
182	Pangako Ng Rebelasyon "The Promise of the Revelation"	40.6% Kantar Media	TBA	February 2, 2016	TBA	TBA	TBA	
183	Pangako Ng Takdang Panahon "The Promise of the Right Time"	33.5% Kantar Media	TBA	February 3, 2016	TBA	TBA	TBA	
184	Pangako Ng Katapatan "The Promise of Loyalty"	40.3% Kantar Media	TBA	February 4, 2016	TBA	TBA	TBA	
185	Pangako Ng Katatagan "The Promise of Fortitude"	37.9% Kantar Media	TBA	February 5, 2016	TBA	TBA	TBA	
186	Pangako Ng Pagkabisto "The Promise of Uncovering"	38.2% Kantar Media	TBA	February 8, 2016	TBA	TBA	TBA	
187	Pangako Ng Hustisiya "The Promise of Justice"	42.7% Kantar Media	TBA	February 9, 2016	TBA	TBA	TBA	
188	Pangako Ng Kasagutan "The Promise of Answers"	42.1% Kantar Media	TBA	February 10, 2016	TBA	TBA	TBA	
189	Pangako Ng Karma "The Promise of Karma"	42.0% Kantar Media	TBA	February 11, 2016	TBA	TBA	TBA	
190	Pangako Ng Wagas Na Pag-ibig "The Promise of Eternal Love"	44.5% Kantar Media	TBA	February 12, 2016	TBA	TBA	TBA	
