= Skipped beat (disambiguation) =

A skipped beat is a heart arrhythmia or palpitation:

- Supraventricular extrasystole

Skipped beat may also refer to:

- Premature ventricular contraction
- Premature atrial contraction
- Cardiac dysrhythmia

== See also ==
- The dictionary definition of skip a beat at Wiktionary
- "Skipping a Beat" (song), a 2013 single by Jordin Sparks off her 2015 album Right Here, Right Now
- Skip Beat!, a Japanese shoujo manga comic book
- Skip Beat! (Taiwanese TV series), a live action TV show based on the Japanese shoujo comics
- Heart Skips a Beat (disambiguation)
