= Pangako sa 'Yo (2015 TV series) =

2015–16 Philippine television drama series

- Title card
- Also known as: The Promise
- Genre: Drama; Romance
- Created by: ABS-CBN Studios
- Based on: Pangako Sa 'Yo (2000–2002)
- Developed by: ABS-CBN Studios: Olivia M. Lamasan; Henry King Quitain
- Written by: Generiza Reyes; Ceres Helga Barrios; Adam Cornelius Asin
- Directed by: Rory B. Quintos; Dado C. Lumibao; Olivia M. Lamasan; Cathy Garcia-Molina; Richard I. Arellano; Mae Czarina Cruz-Alviar; Richard V. Somes; Will C. Fredo
- Starring: Kathryn Bernardo; Daniel Padilla; Jodi Sta. Maria; Angelica Panganiban; Ian Veneracion
- Narrated by: Jodi Sta. Maria as Amor de Jesus
- Opening theme: "Pangako" by Vina Morales
- Ending theme: "Pangako Sa'yo" by Daniel Padilla
- Composer: Rey Valera
- Country of origin: Philippines
- Original language: Filipino
- No. of seasons: 2
- No. of episodes: 190 (list of episodes)

Production
- Executive producers: Carlo Katigbak; Cory Vidanes; Laurenti Dyogi; Malou Santos
- Producers: Sakie Prince-Pendatun; Kristine P. Sioson; Myleen H. Ongkiko
- Editors: Rommel Malimban; Froilan Francia
- Running time: 30–38 minutes
- Production company: Star Creatives

Original release
- Network: ABS-CBN
- Release: May 25, 2015 – February 12, 2016

Related
- Pangako Sa 'Yo (original)

Pangako sa 'Yo (transl. promise to you / international title: The Promise) is a Philippine television drama romance television series broadcast by ABS-CBN. The series is based on the 2000s era Philippine television series of the same title. Directed by Rory B. Quintos, Dado C. Lumibao, Olivia M. Lamasan, Cathy Garcia-Molina, Richard I. Arellano, Mae Czarina Cruz-Alviar, Richard V. Somes and Will C. Fredo, it stars Kathryn Bernardo, Daniel Padilla, Jodi Sta. Maria, Angelica Panganiban, and Ian Veneracion. It aired on the network's Primetime Bida line up and worldwide on TFC from May 25, 2015 to February 12, 2016, replacing Forevermore and was replaced by Dolce Amore.

== Series overview ==
The story revolves around lovers Yna Macaspac and Angelo Buenavista. Unbeknownst to them, their love story started 20 years earlier between Amor de Jesús and Eduardo Buenavista. Unfortunately, Amor and Eduardo's love will be destroyed because of greed, ambition, and lies. Amor returns to the Philippines as Amor Powers and vows revenge on the Buenavista family which will hurt her biological daughter, Yna, in the process. Meanwhile, Madam Claudia, Angelo's mother, will do anything to destroy Yna and Angelo's relationship and make Yna's life a nightmare.

Season	Episodes	Originally released	
Season	Episodes	First released	Last released
1	125	May 25, 2015	November 13, 2015
2	65	November 16, 2015	February 12, 2016

== Cast and characters ==
=== Main cast ===
- Kathryn Bernardo as Yna Macaspac / Maria Amor de Jesus Buenavista
- Daniel Padilla as Angelo S. Buenavista
- Jodi Sta. Maria as Amor de Jesus / Amor Powers
- Ian Veneracion as Eduardo B. Buenavista
- Angelica Panganiban as Claudia Salameda-Buenavista / Greta Barcial

=== Supporting cast ===
Book 1

- Amy Austria-Ventura as Belén Macaspac
- Ronnie Lazaro as Francisco "Iskô" Macaspac
- Andrea Brillantes as Lía S. Buenavista
- Grae Fernández as Jonathan "Egoy" Mobido
- Juan Karlos Labajo as Vincent "Amboy" Mobido
- Diego Loyzaga as David San Luis / David Powers
- Dominic Roque as Mark Delgado
- Alex Díaz as Miguel Ramírez
- Carla Martinez as Leonora Villamejía-Salameda
- Bernard Palanca as Anton Diego Buenavista
- Joem Bascon as Caloy Macaspac
- Jan Marini Pizarras as Lourdes Magbanua / Lourdes Abad
- Sunshine Garcia as Julieta Macaspac
- Niña Dolino as Roma Christie
- Alex Medina as Simón Barcial
- Erika Padilla as Betty Mae Verseles
- Thou Reyes as Takong
- Pamu Pamorada as Kim
- Angelou Alayon as Red Macaspac
- DJ Jhai Ho as Coring
- Arlene Muhlach as Chef Jen
- Lou Veloso as Sous Chef Tony
- Lollie Mara as Yaya Pacita
- Viveika Ravanes as Alta
- BJ Forbes as Adam
- Daniel Ombao as Lloyd
- Jeffrey Tam as Mang Gabby
- Manuel "Ku" Aquino as Antonio P. Macaspac
- Richard Quan as Gov. Theodore "Teddy" Boborol
- Sarah Carlos as Bea Bianca Bejerrano
- Rubi Rubi as Irma Marandanan
- Kyline Alcantara as Jessa Boborol

Book 2

- Tirso Cruz III as Gregorio "Lolo Greggy" Noble
- Sue Ramírez as Joy "Ligaya" Miranda
- Bayani Agbayani as Bronson "Kabayan"
- Mickey Ferriols as Monay
- Kristel Fulgar as Ichu Miranda
- Clarence Delgado as Bubwit
- Patrick Sugui as Lloyd García
- Angel Sy as Sophía
- Ayla Mendero as Patty
- Samantha Colet as Zoe
- Kristine Sablan as Daphne
- Christian Lloyd García as Christian

=== Special participation ===
Book 1

- JB Agustin as young Angelo
- Pilar Pilapil as Doña Benita Buenavista
- Sylvia Sanchez as Krystal Toleda
- Boboy Garovillo as Pepe de Jesús
- Sharmaine Suarez as Chayong de Jesús
- Leo Rialp as Gov. Enrique Salameda
- Jong Cuenco as Mr. Castro
- Anne Feo as Sous Chef Linda
- Mimi Orara as Chef Gina
- Jess Mendoza as Lester de Jesús
- Kimberly Fulgar as Neneth de Jesús
- Khalil Ramos as Jasper Bejerrano
- Sandy Andolong as Myrna Santos-de Jesús
- Bubbles Paraiso as Natalie
- Manny Castañeda as Mang Candy
- Minco Fabregas as Parish Priest
- Odette Khan as Gloria Bejerrano
- Pinky Marquez as Puring Bejerrano
- Cherry Lou as Chef Sheila

Book 2

- Dante Ponce as Christian Cristóbal
- Franco Daza as Andrew García
- Emmanuelle Vera as Chelsea
- Helga Krapf as Marga
- JV Kapunan as Tony
- Toby Alejar as Siegfried García
- Maria Isabel Lopez as Isabel Miranda
- Tom Olivar as Barangay Captain
- Daisy Reyes as Atty. Hazel Santiago
- Matet de Leon as Chef Sam
- Jerome Ponce as Charles García

== Soundtrack ==
- "Pangako" by Vina Morales
- "Panaginip" by Juris
- "Nag-iisa Lang" by Juris (also used as Angeline Quinto's cover version from Inday Bote.)

== Gallery ==
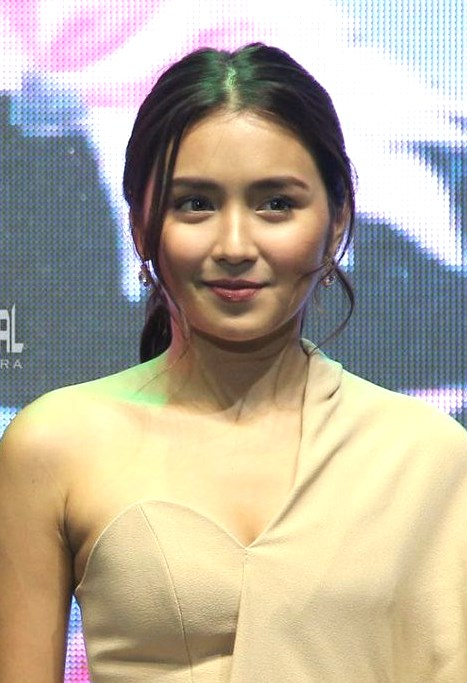
Kathryn Bernardo portrays María Amor de Jesús / Yna Macaspac originally by Filipino actress Kristine Hermosa.

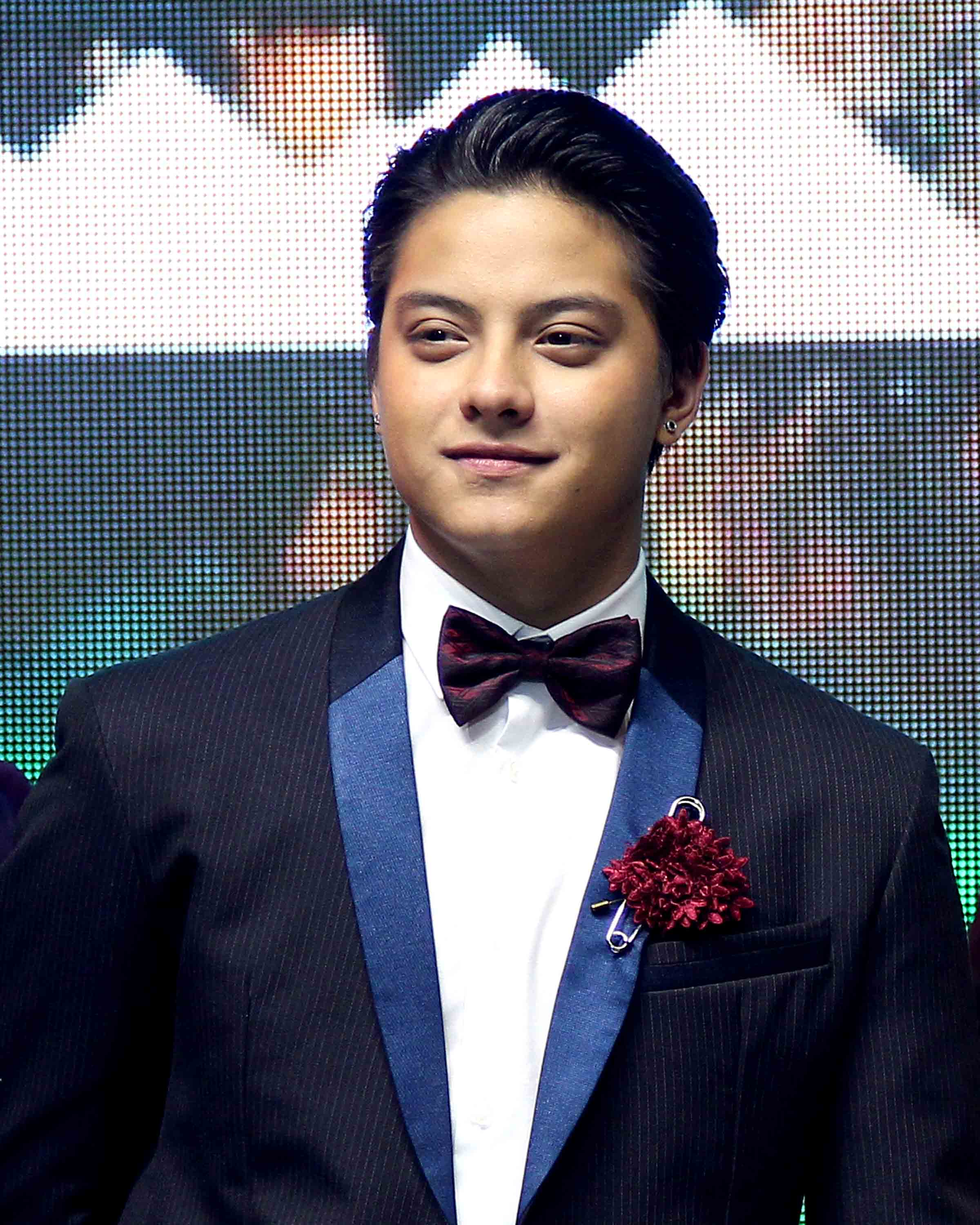
Daniel Padilla portrays Angelo Buenavista originally by Filipino actor Jericho Rosales.

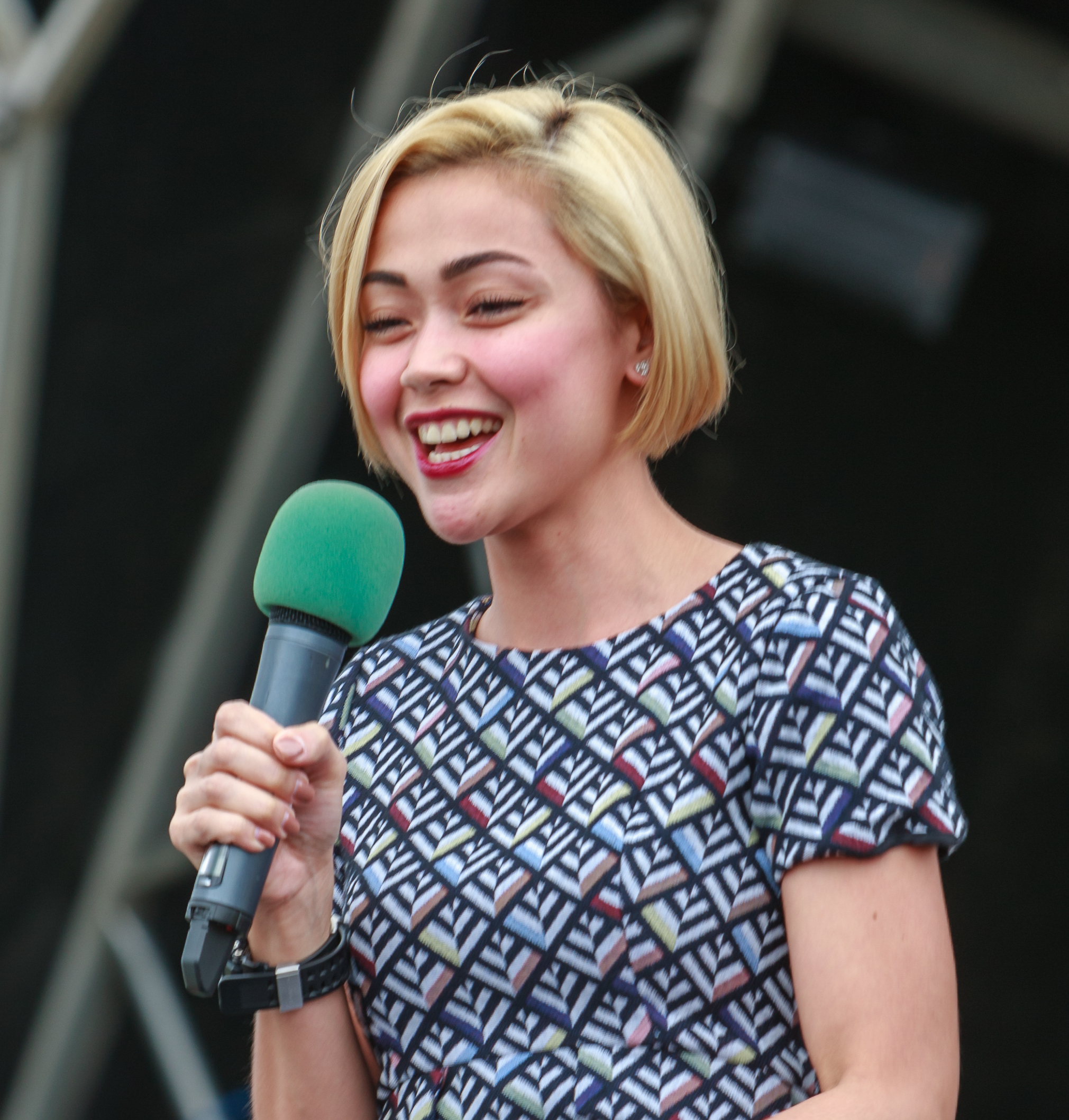
Jodi Sta. Maria portrays Amor de Jesús / Amor Powers originally by Filipino actress Eula Valdez.

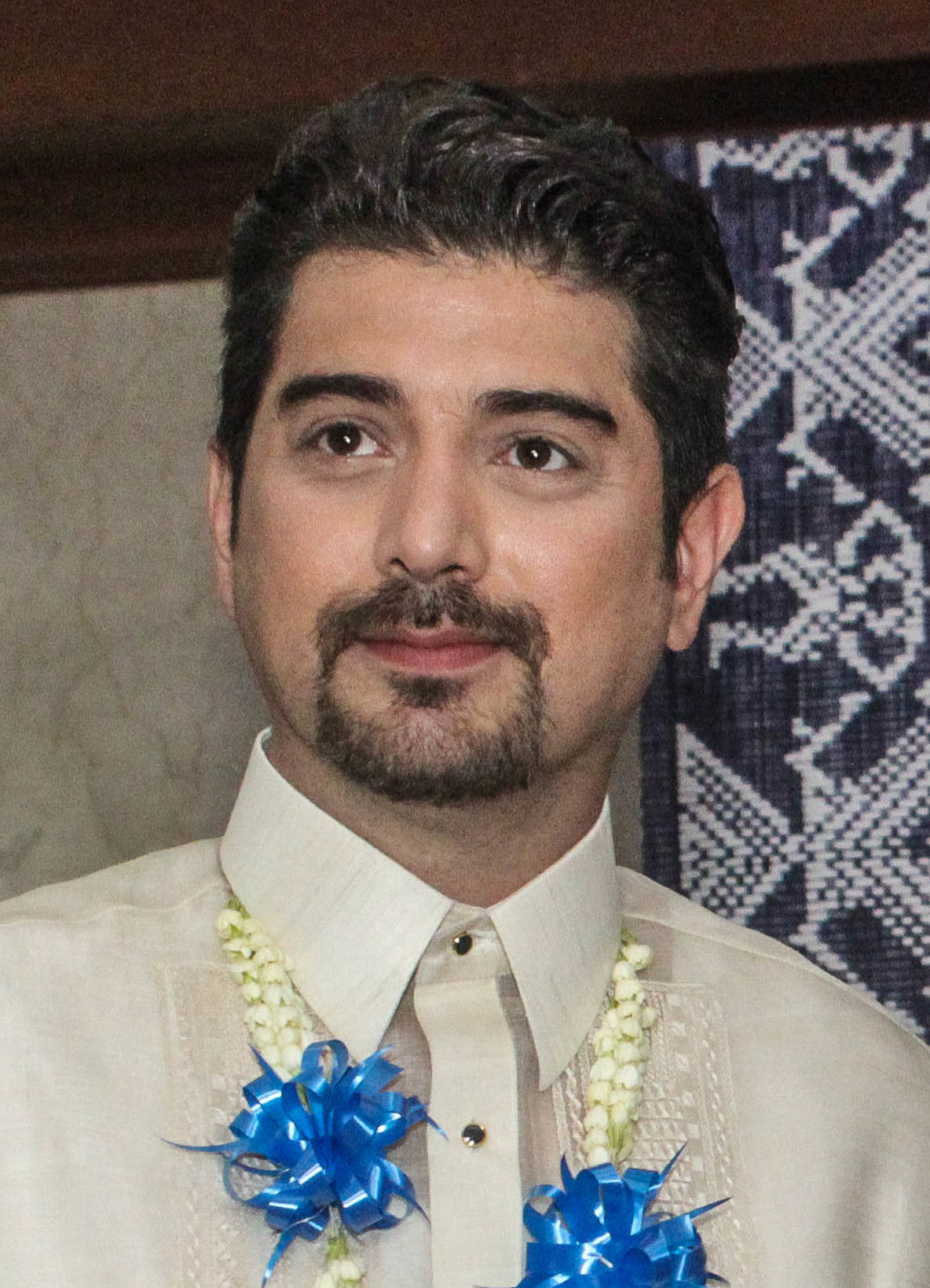
Ian Veneracion portrays Eduardo Buenavista originally by Filipino actor Tonton Gutierrez.

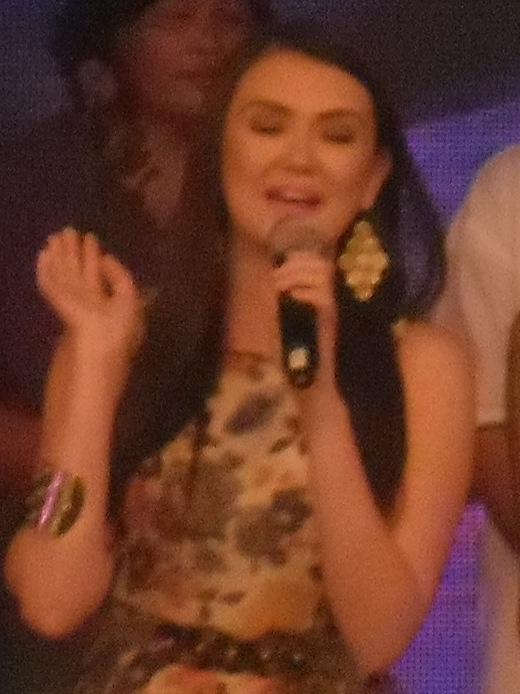
Angelica Panganiban portrays Claudia Salameda / Greta Barcial originally by Filipino actress Jean Garcia.

== Reception ==
KANTAR MEDIA NATIONAL TV RATINGS (8:30 pm PST)
PILOT EPISODE	FINALE EPISODE	PEAK	AVERAGE	SOURCE
34.0%	44.5%	44.5%	39.9%^{1}	

Notes

1. recorded 39.9% in 2015 and 33.5% in 2016

The strict schedule followed during Duterte's proclamation rally factored in the time slot of Pangako Sa 'Yo. An insider in the Duterte campaign team said the real worry was that Tondo residents would disperse if the duration of the proclamation rally got dangerously close to the time slot of the show. Amor and Claudia have become a collection line under a high-end fashion brand.

Daniel Padilla was at the peak of his fresh stardom during that time. In an interview, internationally acclaimed filmmaker Emille Joson shared that after reposting a teaser and promo photos of the series in support of her friends on the production crew, she faced harassment from a group of male volleyball athletes in Plaridel, Bulacan.

The Buenavista Mansion scenes were filmed at the Villanca's Mansion in Baliuag Bulacan, owner of 8 Waves Waterpark, which happens to be owned by a close friend of Joson's sister.

=== Critical reception ===
Katrina Stuart Santiago of The Manila Times praised the writers and added, "Suffice it to say that one cannot wait for what else will happen in this Pangako Sa ‘Yo, and that says a lot for someone who actually followed the original version in 2000."

== Accolades ==
Year	Award giving body	Category	Recipient(s)	Result	Ref.
2015	1st GIC Innovation Awards for Television	Most Innovative Actress	Jodi Sta. Maria	Nominated	
2015	29th PMPC Star Awards for Television	Best Drama Actor	Daniel Padilla	Nominated	
2015	29th PMPC Star Awards for Television	Best Drama Actress	Angelica Panganiban	Nominated	
2015	29th PMPC Star Awards for Television	Best Drama Actress	Jodi Sta. Maria	Nominated	
2015	29th PMPC Star Awards for Television	Best Supporting Actor	Ronnie Lazaro	Nominated	
2015	29th PMPC Star Awards for Television	Best Supporting Actress	Amy Austria-Ventura	Nominated	
2015	1st RAWR Awards	TV Show of the Year	Pangako Sa 'Yo	Nominated	
2015	1st RAWR Awards	Character of the Year (as Amor Powers)	Jodi Sta. Maria	Nominated	
2015	1st RAWR Awards	Character of the Year (as Claudia Buenavista)	Angelica Panganiban	Nominated	
2015	1st RAWR Awards	QOTY (Quote of the Year) "Matitikman ninyo ang batas ng isang api!" – Amor Powers	Jodi Sta. Maria	Nominated	
2015	6th TV Series Craze Awards	TV Series Craze Award for Leading Lady of the Year	Jodi Sta. Maria	Won	
2015	6th TV Series Craze Awards	TV Series Craze Award for Leading Man of the Year	Ian Veneracion	Won	
2016	2016 Gawad Tanglaw Awards	Best Performance by an Actress (TV Series)	Jodi Sta. Maria	Won	
2016	2016 International Emmy Awards	International Emmy Award for Best Actress	Jodi Sta. Maria	Nominated	
2016	PUSH Award	Popular TV Performance	Jodi Sta. Maria and Angelica Panganiban	Nominated	
2016	2nd RAWR Awards	TV Show of the Year	Pangako Sa 'Yo	Won	

== Adaptation ==
An upcoming Mexican adaptation of the series is in the works.

== International broadcast ==
- The series was aired in Indonesia on MNCTV (titled Janjiku and dubbed in Indonesian), one of the main commercial TV networks of the country from November 21, 2016 until January 13, 2017. Due to its popularity, the series was reaired by MNCTV from January 12, 2017.
- The series was also aired in Malaysia (dubbed into Malay language) on Astro Prima and Astro Maya HD, started from January 2017 until May 2017.
- (Peru) The Peruvian network Panamericana Televisión announced it would air and dub the series in Spanish under the name of La Promesa and is the second Filipino drama production to be broadcast in Latin America after Puentes de Amor (Bridges of Love). The show premiered on Thursday, September 22, 2016, by Panamericana Televisión de Perú, from Monday to Friday at 5:30 p.m. and ended on March 3, 2017.

== See also ==
- Pangako Sa 'Yo (original version)
- List of programs broadcast by ABS-CBN
- List of telenovelas of ABS-CBN
