= Kantar Media Philippines =

Philippine market research firm

- Type: Subsidiary
- Industry: Marketing
- Founded: February 2009; 17 years ago
- Headquarters: 4th Floor Kalayaan Center, 65 V. Luna Road corner Kalayaan Avenue, Brgy. Pinyahan, Quezon City, Metro Manila, Philippines
- Services: Market research Consultancy
- Parent: Kantar Group
- Website: kantarmedia.com

Kantar Media Research Philippines (formerly known as Kantar/TNS Philippines, popularly referred to as Kantar Media Philippines or simply Kantar Media) is a market research firm in the Philippines that specializes in broadcast media. Kantar Media is responsible for audience measurement of television ratings across the country. ABS-CBN is the main television partner of Kantar Media Philippines.

As of 2015, Kantar Media employs a nationwide panel of 2,610 urban and rural households, with a respondent base of 7,000 individuals representing one hundred percent (100%) of the total Philippine TV viewing population.

The panel reports on seven sectors, namely National Capital Region, Suburbs, North Luzon, Central Luzon, South Luzon, Visayas, and Mindanao. The Suburbs consist of four provinces: Bulacan, Cavite, Laguna, and Rizal.

== History ==
In January 2009, Kantar Media officially released its national television audience measurement data in the Philippines via Taylor Nelson Sofres (TNS) Media, a subsidiary of Kantar Group. In February 2009, Kantar Group merged TNS with Kantar Media Research International, which is now called Kantar Media.

In June 2012, Kantar Media launched its Mega Manila TV Advertising Expenditure Service, integrated with its audience measurement service through Infosys+. This integration provides faster access to information and combines data from time blocks, programs, and advertisements into a single analysis to serve leading local and regional broadcast networks, advertising agencies, and media planners. Furthermore, Kantar Media also offers custom media research services for radio, print, and digital media.

Kantar Media became the official radio survey partner of the Radio Research Council (RRC) and Kapisanan ng mga Brodkaster ng Pilipinas (KBP) in December 2014, covering 53 cities in the Philippines.

Originally, due to the COVID-19 pandemic and the broadcast stoppage of its main partner ABS-CBN due to the non-renewal of its congressional franchise on July 10, 2020, Kantar Media announced that it would end its television ratings service by the end of 2020. However, the plan was reversed after ABS-CBN secured a deal with Jesus Is Lord Church Worldwide through ZOE Broadcasting Network to air some programs on A2Z Channel 11 (formerly ZOE TV, QTV/Q, and GMA News TV). ABS-CBN to broadcast a selected deal with Villar Group owned by the All Value Holdings Inc. through Advanced Media Broadcasting System of current ABS-CBN programs of All TV.
