= Be My Lady =

2016 Philippine television drama series

- Title card
- Genre: Romance; Drama; Comedy
- Created by: Mel Mendoza-Del Rosario
- Directed by: Theodore Boborol; Don Cuaresma; Roderick Lindayag
- Starring: Erich Gonzales; Daniel Matsunaga
- Music by: Jessie Lasaten
- Opening theme: "Be My Lady" by Jason Dy
- Ending theme: "Mahal Ka Sa Akin" by Tanya Dawood
- Composers: Martin Nievera; Vehnee Saturno
- Country of origin: Philippines
- Original languages: Filipino; English; Portuguese
- No. of seasons: 4
- No. of episodes: 221 (list of episodes)

Production
- Executive producers: Carlo Katigbak; Cory Vidanes; Laurenti Dyogi; Ruel Bayani
- Producers: Katrina Juban; Mavic Holgado-Oducayen†
- Production locations: Pampanga, Philippines; Singapore; Metro Manila, Philippines; Siem Reap, Cambodia
- Editor: Alexces Megan Abarquez
- Running time: 28–31 minutes
- Production company: RSB Drama Unit

Original release
- Network: ABS-CBN
- Release: January 18 – November 25, 2016

Be My Lady is a 2016 Philippine television drama romance series broadcast by ABS-CBN. Directed by Theodore C. Boborol, Don M. Cuaresma and Roderick P. Lindayag, it stars Erich Gonzales and Daniel Matsunaga. It aired on the network's Prime Tanghali line up and worldwide on TFC from January 18 to November 25, 2016, replacing Ningning and was replaced by Langit Lupa.

== Plot ==
Burdened by hospital and day to day expenses, Marcela the matriarch had no other choice but to work in Singapore as a nanny to reclaim the farm and help provide for the basic needs for the family. With Marcy in Singapore, Pinang was tasked to be the "ilaw ng tahanan". And she does so with all her heart. On the other hand, Marcy works to tame the naughty Philip Olivera in Singapore. Phil was a troubled child, a KSP kid for he wasn't cared for by his busy mom. He found a mother's warmth in Marcy. Just when Marcy and Phil were starting to get close, Phil accidentally got Marcy deported for shoplifting. Marcy's deportation marked another difficult hardship in the life of the family. The family farm which is their most prized possession was seized by the lending company where it was pawned.

At present, Pinang's family strives to get the farm back. Pinang aspires to be a nurse in the UK. Her focus and goal are to be successful, no lovelife, no time for romance. She grew up to be a woman with firm and strict principles. Then, as fate would have it, Pinang met Phil. The reason for all of the family's hardship. Just the mere sight of him makes her mad. But the more she gets to know him, the more she falls for him. In return, Phil learns what it's like to be a Filipino, have a complete family and fall in love with a Filipina.

== Cast and characters ==
=== Main cast ===
- Erich Gonzales as Filipina "Pinang" B. Crisostomo-Oliviera
- Daniel Matsunaga as Philip "Phil" Oliviera

=== Supporting cast ===
- Janice de Belen as Marcela Bernabe-Crisostomo "Marcy"
- Al Tantay as Emilio Crisostomo "Tatay Emil"
- Priscilla Meirelles-Estrada as Chelsea Oliviera
- Yayo Aguila as Elsa Soliman
- Loisa Andalio as Margaret Soliman
- Yves Flores as Julian Crisostomo
- Karen Dematera as Nurse Miguela "Miggy" Soliman
- MJ Cayabyab as Nurse Narciso "Nars" Malvar
- RK Bagatsing as Macario "Kuya Mackie" Crisostomo
- Mike Lloren as Andres "Andy" Crisostomo
- Ana Abad-Santos as Soledad "Sol" Alvarez-Crisostomo
- Almira Muhlach as Anita Crisostomo
- Franchesca Floirendo as Gabriella "Gab" Crisostomo
- Nonoy Froilan as Apolinario "Lolo Apo" Bernabe
- Nathaniel Britt as James Mariano

=== Guest cast ===
- Gwen Zamora as Sophia Elizalde
- Geoff Eigenmann as Doc. Joselito Mariano
- Mark Rivera as Johann Villanueva
- Richard Juan as Kevin Go
- Jason Dy as Emerson Francisco
- Mari Kaimo as Akiro Hiroshi
- Karen Reyes as Rose
- Devon Seron as Lotlot
- Danita Paner as Monica
- Marife Necesito as Dahila
- Rein Guttierez as Sean

=== Special participation ===
- Bruce Roeland as young Phil
- Francine Diaz as young Pinang

== Series overview ==
Season	Episodes	Originally released	
Season	Episodes	First released	Last released
1	136	January 18, 2016	July 29, 2016
2	45	August 1, 2016	September 30, 2016
3	25	October 3, 2016	November 4, 2016
4	15	November 7, 2016	November 25, 2016

== List of episodes ==
=== Chapter 1 ===
No.	Title	Original air date
1	'Yay!'	January 18, 2016
2	'Hello SG'	January 19, 2016
3	'Bulalo'	January 20, 2016
4	'Phil and Pinang'	January 21, 2016
5	'He Is The One'	January 22, 2016
6	'First Kiss'	January 25, 2016
7	'Reunited'	January 26, 2016
8	'Have A Nice Day'	January 27, 2016
9	'Leche Flan'	January 28, 2016
10	'Hello'	January 29, 2016
11	'Fishball Date'	February 1, 2016
12	'Passport'	February 2, 2016
13	'Reveal'	February 3, 2016
14	'New Home'	February 4, 2016
15	'Baguio'	February 5, 2016
16	'Birthday'	February 8, 2016
17	'Lipat Bahay'	February 9, 2016
18	'Comeback'	February 10, 2016
19	'Offer'	February 11, 2016
20	'Business Date'	February 12, 2016
21	'Deal'	February 15, 2016
22	'I Love Pinang'	February 16, 2016
23	'Surprise'	February 17, 2016
24	'Signatures'	February 18, 2016
25	'Bibes'	February 19, 2016
26	'Sugod'	February 22, 2016
27	'Caregiver'	February 23, 2016
28	'Rent'	February 24, 2016
29	'Koral'	February 25, 2016
30	'Huli Ka'	February 26, 2016
31	'Kwak'	February 29, 2016
32	'Alaala'	March 1, 2016
33	'Do Not'	March 2, 2016
34	'Kupido'	March 3, 2016
35	'Sine'	March 4, 2016
36	'14344'	March 7, 2016
37	'Putikan'	March 8, 2016
38	'Pag-ibig Kita'	March 9, 2016
39	'Butterflies'	March 10, 2016
40	'Haplos'	March 11, 2016
41	'Denial Stage'	March 14, 2016
42	'The Sign'	March 15, 2016
43	'Videoke'	March 16, 2016
44	'Coffee Date'	March 17, 2016
45	'Spark'	March 18, 2016
46	'Bracelet'	March 21, 2016
47	'Pimple'	March 22, 2016
48	'Wishes'	March 23, 2016
49	'Roadtrip'	March 28, 2016
50	'Manila'	March 29, 2016
51	'The Right Girl'	March 30, 2016
52	'Defensive'	March 31, 2016
53	'Accident'	April 1, 2016
54	'Romantic Cooking Show'	April 4, 2016
55	'Board Exams'	April 5, 2016
56	'Blowout'	April 6, 2016
57	'Sandals'	April 7, 2016
58	'Confirmed'	April 8, 2016
59	'Certificate'	April 11, 2016
60	'Just Smile'	April 12, 2016
61	'Rehearsals'	April 13, 2016
62	'Visa'	April 14, 2016
63	'Blessings'	April 15, 2016
64	'Salamat Po'	April 18, 2016
65	'Ligaw'	April 19, 2016
66	'Just Dance'	April 20, 2016
67	'Just The 2 Of Us'	April 21, 2016
68	'Results'	April 22, 2016
69	'Everlasting'	April 25, 2016
70	'Bintana'	April 26, 2016
71	'Love Hurts'	April 27, 2016
72	'Labnat'	April 28, 2016
73	'Outing'	April 29, 2016
74	'Summer Body'	May 2, 2016
75	'I Love You'	May 3, 2016
76	'Jacket'	May 4, 2016
77	'New Look'	May 5, 2016
78	'Kasama Ka'	May 6, 2016
79	'Lucky Charm'	May 10, 2016
80	'Warning'	May 11, 2016
81	'Akyat Ligaw'	May 12, 2016
82	'Flames'	May 13, 2016
83	'Request'	May 16, 2016
84	'Tula'	May 17, 2016
85	'Ligaw Pamilya'	May 18, 2016
86	'Football'	May 19, 2016
87	'Selos'	May 20, 2016
88	'Friend Request'	May 23, 2016
89	'Buking'	May 24, 2016
90	'Cheerleader'	May 25, 2016
91	'Makulit Na Puso'	May 26, 2016
92	'Dear Pinang'	May 27, 2016
93	'Love Letter'	May 30, 2016
94	'Brother'	May 31, 2016
95	'Alaga'	June 1, 2016
96	'Nilalanggam'	June 2, 2016
97	'Dear Phil'	June 3, 2016
98	'Tatlong Bibe'	June 6, 2016
99	'Dinner Date'	June 7, 2016
100	'Paper Plane'	June 8, 2016
101	'Bibe Names'	June 9, 2016
102	'Born Again'	June 10, 2016
103	'Sweet Dance'	June 13, 2016
104	'Confessions'	June 14, 2016
105	'Visitors'	June 15, 2016
106	'Sineguelas'	June 16, 2016
107	'Special Day'	June 17, 2016
108	'Love Wins'	June 20, 2016
109	'Doctor Who'	June 21, 2016
110	'Miss Kita'	June 22, 2016
111	'Sabay Tayo'	June 23, 2016
112	'Decision'	June 24, 2016
113	'Smiley'	June 27, 2016
114	'Goals'	June 28, 2016
115	'Sleepover'	June 29, 2016
116	'Good Morning'	July 1, 2016
117	'Back For Good'	July 4, 2016
118	'Hatid Sundo'	July 5, 2016
119	'Phil Meets Doc'	July 6, 2016
120	'Boom'	July 7, 2016
121	'VIP'	July 8, 2016
122	'Housewarming'	July 11, 2016
123	'Love Heals'	July 12, 2016
124	'Meet The Parent'	July 13, 2016
125	'Face Off'	July 14, 2016
126	'Secret'	July 15, 2016
127	'Right Girl'	July 18, 2016
128	'Meet The Family'	July 19, 2016
129	'Necklace'	July 20, 2016
130	'Dinner Date'	July 21, 2016
131	'Right Time'	July 22, 2016
132	'Perfect'	July 25, 2016
133	'Chocolate'	July 26, 2016
134	'Kakampi'	July 27, 2016
135	'Family Dinner'	July 28, 2016
136	'The Truth'	July 29, 2016

=== Chapter 2 ===
No.	No. in season	Title	Original air date
137	1	'I Love You Too'	August 1, 2016
138	2	'Most Awaited'	August 2, 2016
139	3	'Officially Yours'	August 3, 2016
140	4	'Bibs'	August 4, 2016
141	5	'Couple Shirt'	August 5, 2016
142	6	'Goal Zero'	August 8, 2016
143	7	'Homecoming'	August 9, 2016
144	8	'Bibe Time'	August 10, 2016
145	9	'Fast Date'	August 11, 2016
146	10	'Bibe Hut'	August 12, 2016
147	11	'Stargazing'	August 15, 2016
148	12	'Free Hugs'	August 16, 2016
149	13	'Congrats'	August 17, 2016
150	14	'Volunteers'	August 18, 2016
151	15	'Olympics'	August 19, 2016
152	16	'Unsent'	August 22, 2016
153	17	'Halaya'	August 23, 2016
154	18	'Mission'	August 24, 2016
155	19	'Usapang Lalake'	August 25, 2016
156	20	'Clingy'	August 26, 2016
157	21	'Double Date'	August 29, 2016
158	22	'lnvitation'	August 30, 2016
159	23	'Sibling Goals'	August 31, 2016
160	24	'Monthsary'	September 1, 2016
161	25	'Thanksgiving'	September 2, 2016
162	26	'Baile'	September 5, 2016
163	27	'Permission'	September 6, 2016
164	28	'Double Shift'	September 7, 2016
165	29	'Karamay'	September 8, 2016
166	30	'Bowling'	September 9, 2016
167	31	'Fight For Love'	September 12, 2016
168	32	'Maling Akala'	September 13, 2016
169	33	'First Love'	September 14, 2016
170	34	'Bayad Utang'	September 15, 2016
171	35	'Reconcile'	September 16, 2016
172	36	'Options'	September 19, 2016
173	37	'Trust'	September 20, 2016
174	38	'First Kiss'	September 21, 2016
175	39	'Bibest'	September 22, 2016
176	40	'Lady Boss'	September 23, 2016
177	41	'Overtime'	September 26, 2016
178	42	'Marcy's Best'	September 27, 2016
179	43	'Bazaar'	September 28, 2016
180	44	'Stuck'	September 29, 2016
181	45	'Check Up'	September 30, 2016

=== Chapter 3 ===
No.	No. in season	Title	Original air date
182	1	'Confidential'	October 3, 2016
183	2	'Discovery'	October 4, 2016
184	3	'Para Kay Tay Emil'	October 5, 2016
185	4	'Pamana'	October 6, 2016
186	5	'Keep The Faith'	October 7, 2016
187	6	'Pag-Asa'	October 10, 2016
188	7	'Pray For Emil'	October 11, 2016
189	8	'Buhay'	October 12, 2016
190	9	'Game Plan'	October 13, 2016
191	10	'New Life'	October 14, 2016
192	11	'Kayang Kaya'	October 17, 2016
193	12	'Be Positive'	October 18, 2016
194	13	'Fight'	October 19, 2016
195	14	'For Sale'	October 20, 2016
196	15	'Solusyon'	October 21, 2016
197	16	'Grand Opening'	October 24, 2016
198	17	'Diskarte'	October 25, 2016
199	18	'Welcome Home'	October 26, 2016
200	19	'Bagong Pangarap'	October 27, 2016
201	20	'Acceptance'	October 28, 2016
202	21	'Much Awaited'	October 31, 2016
203	22	'Therapy'	November 1, 2016
204	23	'Second Chance'	November 2, 2016
205	24	'Engagement Ring'	November 3, 2016
206	25	'The Proposal'	November 4, 2016

=== Chapter 4 ===
No.	No. in season	Title	Original air date
207	1	'Yes E-YES!'	November 7, 2016
208	2	'Isang Pamilya Tayo'	November 8, 2016
209	3	'Ha Ha Ha Ha Ha!'	November 9, 2016
210	4	'Pakiusap'	November 10, 2016
211	5	'The Lie'	November 11, 2016
212	6	'Wedding Prep'	November 14, 2016
213	7	'Zero The Hero!'	November 15, 2016
214	8	'Tuloy Ang Kasal'	November 16, 2016
215	9	'Everlasting Vow'	November 17, 2016
216	10	'Honeymoon'	November 18, 2016
217	11	'Preggy'	November 21, 2016
218	12	'Paglilihi'	November 22, 2016
219	13	'Complications'	November 23, 2016
220	14	'Faded'	November 24, 2016
221	15	'Everlasting Finale'	November 25, 2016

== Reception ==
=== Ratings ===
Based on the data provided by AGB Nielsen, Be My Lady and Princess in the Palace only had a 0.6 difference in TV ratings. Princess in the Palace still had the upper hand after scoring 11.9% in Mega Manila. Be My Lady came close with 11.3% during its pilot episode. However, Be My Lady had a strong pilot episode based on nationwide TV ratings by Kantar/TNS Media. The Erich Gonzales-Daniel Matsunaga starer garnered 18.7%, which is twice that of Princess in the Palace's 8.2% national rating.

Kantar Media National TV Ratings (11:30AM PST)
Pilot Episode	Finale Episode	Peak	Average
18.7% January 18, 2016	18.2% November 25, 2016	21.7% June 9, 2016	TBD

== Re-runs ==
Be My Lady aired its re-runs on Kapamilya Channel's Kapamilya Gold afternoon block, Kapamilya Online Live, and A2Z's Zuper Hapon from February 21 to December 30, 2022 (replacing the re-runs of Nang Ngumiti ang Langit and was replaced by the re-runs of A Soldier's Heart).

It aired re-runs on Jeepney TV from March 25 to August 23, 2019; August 7, 2023 to June 14, 2024; and August 17, 2026 to February 19, 2027.

== See also ==
- List of programs broadcast by ABS-CBN
- List of ABS-CBN Studios original drama series
- List of programs broadcast by Jeepney TV
