= Langit Lupa =

2016–17 Philippine television drama series

- Title card
- Also known as: Heaven and Earth
- Genre: Family drama; Comedy; Romance
- Created by: Mel Mendoza-Del Rosario
- Written by: Raymund Barcelon; Maribel Ilag; Margarette Labrador; Ruel Montane Puki Malanam; Christine Marie Gara; Arnold Saño Galicia; Denise O'Hara; Cherry Villaluz
- Directed by: Carlo Po Artillaga; Myla Ajero-Gaite; Ludwig Peralta
- Starring: Xia Vigor; Yesha Camile
- Opening theme: "Langit Lupa" by Esang de Torres
- Country of origin: Philippines
- Original language: Filipino
- No. of episodes: 108 (list of episodes)

Production
- Executive producers: Carlo Katigbak; Cory Vidanes; Laurenti Dyogi; Ruel Bayani
- Producers: Edgar Joseph J. Mallari; Rizza Gonzales-Ebriega
- Production locations: Philippines; Hong Kong
- Editors: Joy Buenaventura; Dennis Salgado
- Running time: 31–42 minutes
- Production company: RSB Drama Unit

Original release
- Network: ABS-CBN
- Release: November 28, 2016 – April 28, 2017

Related
- Mga Anghel na Walang Langit; May Bukas Pa; Agua Bendita; Momay; 100 Days to Heaven; Dahil sa Pag-ibig; Annaliza; Nathaniel; My Dear Heart; Nang Ngumiti ang Langit; Huwag Kang Mangamba; Love in 40 Days

Langit Lupa (International title/Translation: Heaven and Earth) is a Philippine television drama family series broadcast by ABS-CBN. Directed by Carlo Po Artillaga, Myla Ajero-Gaite and Ludwig Peralta, it stars Xia Vigor and Yesha Camile. It aired on the network's Prime Tanghali line up and worldwide on TFC from November 28, 2016, to April 28, 2017, replacing Be My Lady and was replaced by Ikaw Lang ang Iibigin.

This series was streaming online on YouTube.

== Plot ==
The story begins with Dey (Alessandra De Rossi) and Lala (Yam Concepcion), who promised each other that they will face all the obstacles in life and be bestfriends forever. They started being friends since they were young. They had a shoe business, got married, and later on became mothers. They both named their children "Princess."

A big challenge will ruin their friendship when Ian (Patrick Garcia), Lala's husband, stole Lala and Dey's shares from the company to pay his loans. This becomes more challenging when Dey was hospitalized because of cardiac arrest, so Joey (Jason Abalos), Dey's husband, needs money for Dey's operation and has no choice but to ask Dey's shares from Lala. However, Lala can't provide anything since Ian stole the money, which led to Dey's death. This soon led to Joey's hatred towards Lala.

Ian left the country to stay away from Lala after stealing the money. Meanwhile, Joey, together with Lolo Pogi (Boboy Garrovillo), Jun-Jun (Jairus Aquino), and baby Esang (Yesha Camile), moved on and started a new life without Dey.

Years after, Esang (Yesha Camile) and Princess (Xia Vigor) grew up; Esang, Dey and Joey's child, grew up with a loving and caring family even if they are not rich; Princess, Lala and Ian's child, grew up in a wealthy family that has no time for each other.

Esang and Princess became schoolmates. They eventually have a blossoming friendship after some initial misunderstandings, such as when Esang took care of Princess' dog, Pencil, but Esang named it "Yoyo."

== Cast and characters ==
=== Main cast ===
Actor	Character	Description
Xia Vigor	Princess G. Chavez	Princess is Lala and Ian's daughter. She was only raised by her mother, as her father, Ian escaped to another country after he stole money from Dey and Lala. She grew up in a wealthy family, unlike Esang who grew up less fortunate. Princess has a dog named Pencil, who she considers her only friend because she has none. On the first day of school, she got bullied and started crying in the restroom and was heard by Esang, who mistook her for a ghost. At first, Princess constantly rejected Esang's attempts to become friends. Eventually, the two girls develop a strong friendship. In the season finale, after Ian died, she discovered Joey's feelings for her mother, Lala. But she accepts him.
Yesha Camile	Princess "Esang" M. Garcia	Esang is Dey and Joey's daughter. She lost her mother at a younger age due to cardiac arrest, and was raised by her father, grandfather, and uncle. Even though she was raised without her mother, she is still the "Princess" of the family. A loving daughter, whose only concern is her loved ones. She has a kind heart and is kind to everyone she meets even if they are rude and mean to her at first. During her first day at school, when she used the restroom, she heard Princess crying and thought she was a ghost. After finding out the truth, she tries several attempts to befriend her and start a friendship. Esang and Princess then become best friends. Esang promised Princess that she would defend her from the bullies. Esang and Princess then introduce each other to their respective families, but unknown to them are the problems of the past with their mothers.
Jason Abalos	Joey Garcia	Dey's widower and Esang's father. He was Dey's childhood friend who showed her true love. He swore to love Dey for the rest of their lives. Joey's world will fall apart as the love of his life dies. When Dey needed to undergo surgery, he begged Lala for their shares; however, she couldn't do this because Ian stole it to pay off his debts. When Dey died, Joey blames Lala for her death because "she killed her best friend." After Dey's death, Joey and Lolo Pogi raise Dey's daughter and call her Princess or "Esang." Joey is a hardworking and loving father who will do everything to try to give Esang the things she needs despite not being wealthy. In the end, he proposed to Lala and the two are engaged.
Yam Concepcion	Priscilla "Lala" Gutierrez-Chavez	The main protagonist of the series. Lala is Dey's best friend, Ian's wife, and Princess' mother. After graduating from college, she and Dey became business partners in a shoe company. The business was an ultimate success; Dey designed the shoes and Lala would make them. When she fell in love with Ian, Dey tried to tell her that Ian would just cheat on her; however, she didn't listen. Upon realizing what Ian has done, Lala wakes up to her senses and tries to return Dey's shares, wishing to help the dying Dey. But it was too late, and Dey died. Lala raised her daughter alone and continued her and Dey's business. Lala comes back into Joey's life, and their past will resurface as their respective children become best friends. In the season finale, she and Joey are engaged.
Patrick Garcia	Christian "Ian" Chavez†	Lala's husband and Princess's father. A womanizer who married Lala, Ian was the cause of all misfortunes and problems, including the death of Dey, because he stole Dey and Lala's money and shares in hopes of paying his debts. Knowing what he has done, Ian abandons the responsibilities as a father and husband and goes abroad to start a new life. He cheated on Lala several times, but knowing that she loves Ian she will always forgive him. Ian later returns from abroad to fix all of his mistakes from the past, especially to redeem himself as Princess's father. He has a girlfriend named Isadora, and becomes the adoptive father of her daughter Trixie. Later, Ian died from chest pain due to heart disease.
Ellen Adarna	Isadora "Issa" Sobrevista	The main antagonist of the series, and Trixie's mother. When Ian returns from abroad back to the Philippines, it is revealed that she is Ian's new girlfriend. The only reason why she is with Ian is because she wants to steal money from the shoe company founded by Dey and Lala. Later on, Issa becomes more manipulative and selfish than ever as she attempts to keep Ian all to herself, not caring who gets hurt in the process. She also despises both Esang and Princess, referring herself to the children as the "Kinatatakotan." After Ian's death, she had a change of heart. She apologizes to Lala. In the end, she and Trixie moved to the mainland.

=== Supporting cast ===
Actor	Character	Description
Alessandra De Rossi	Daisylyn "Dey" Marasigan-Garcia†	Pogi's daughter and Jun-Jun's older sister. During her childhood years, she befriended Lala and they became best friends. After they finished college, Lala surprised her by opening their own shoe company; Dey will do the designs and Lala will create them. Dey then marries her childhood friend Joey and they had a daughter named Esang. To pay his debts, Ian, Lala's husband, ran off with money from Dey's shares of the company. One morning, Dey suffered from a cardiac arrest and was brought to the hospital. Joey begged Lala for the money but it was too late. Before Dey died, she told Joey to take care of their daughter.
Boboy Garrovillo	Lyndon "Lolo Pogi" Marasigan Sr.	Dey and Jun-Jun's father, Joey's father-in-law and Esang's grandfather.
Jairus Aquino	Lyndon "Jun-Jun / Batas" Marasigan Jr.	Lolo Pogi's son, Dey's younger brother, Joey's brother-in-law and Esang's uncle.
Sharlene San Pedro	Corazon "Heart" Cayabyab	Joey, Lolo Pogi, and Jun-Jun's neighbor. She is also Jun-Jun's classmate.
Miho Nishida	Cindy Manlangit	Diday's younger half sister who moved to Manila to study culinary arts. She, along with Diday work for Lala. She falls in love with Princess' teacher, Keith; however, Diday disapproves of them being together.
Tommy Esguerra	Keith "Kit" Principe	Princess' teacher at Little Thinkers, who started off as her home school teacher. There, he meets Diday's sister, Cindy and falls in love with her as time passes.
Angelica Ulip	Patricia "Trixie" Sobrevista	Isadora's daughter and Ian's adopted daughter. She, along with Issa, was left by her father so Ian becomes her father figure instead. When she meets Princess, she starts being mean to her due to jealousy over the latter being Ian's biological daughter. Trixie then extends her behavior to Esang when she saw her with Princess at the Sunday market. In the end, she apologizes to Princess, Esang, and Lala. She and Issa moved to the mainland.
Viveika Ravanes	Ma. Diosa "Diday" Manlangit	Diday works for Lala and helps her take care of Princess. She is Cindy's half-sister and is strict with her but only because she wants her to be able to reach her dreams. She sacrificed a lot for Cindy and her family.

=== Extended cast ===
- Lilet as Teresa Principe
- Jean Saburit as Valerie
- Kitkat as Gigi
- Ron Morales as Bong
- Niña Dolino as Wilma
- Vivo Ouano as Mark
- Frenchie Dy as Shirley
- Gerard Acao as Benjie
- Ryan Rems as Jawo
- Angelo Ilagan as Jordan
- Paulo Angeles as Ivan
- Barbie Imperial as Jenny
- Dominic Roque as Luis
- Nhikzy Calma as Paeng
- Jef Gaitan as Monique
- Igi Boy Flores as Obet
- John Bermudo as Toyo
- Rhett Romero as Ricky
- Freddie Webb as Mario
- Irra Cenina as Teacher Brian

=== Special participation ===
- Trisha Redd Yosa as young Dey
- Faye Alhambra as young Lala
- Symon de Lena as young Jun-Jun/Batas
- CX Navarro as preteen Jun-Jun/Batas
- Elia Ilano as young Heart
- Cheska Iñigo as Margaret
- Bugoy Cariño as young Keith
- Ashley Sarmiento as young Issa

== Re-runs ==
It aired re-runs on Jeepney TV from July 16 to August 31, 2018; September 14 to December 11, 2020; July 18 to September 23, 2022; June 10 to August 23, 2024 (also aired on ALLTV); and January 26 to April 10, 2026.

== Reception ==
Kantar Media National TV Ratings (11:30AM PST)
Pilot Episode	Finale Episode	Peak	Average
17.5% November 28, 2016	15.0% April 28, 2017	18.9% November 30, 2016	15.0%

== See also ==
- List of programs broadcast by ABS-CBN
- List of ABS-CBN Studios original drama series
- List of programs broadcast by Jeepney TV
