= Nadine Lustre discography =

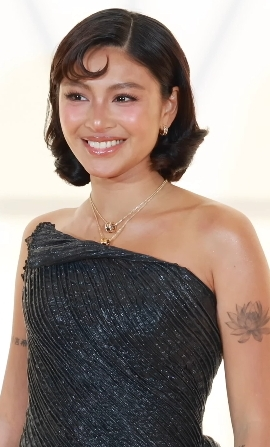
- Studio albums: 1
- EPs: 1
- Soundtrack albums: 3
- Singles: 19
- Promotional singles: 3

Filipino singer-actress Nadine Lustre has released one studio album, one extended play, three soundtrack albums, one collaborative album and nineteen singles.

Lustre signed with Viva Artist Agency and its music subsidiary Viva Records (2009-2017). She started her career as member of a girl group called Pop Girls which was launched in 2009. In the same year, Pop Girls released a self-titled, debut album Pop Girls which includes 13 tracks under Viva Records.

She decided to leave Pop Girls and pursued a solo career in 2011. Lustre released a self-titled, extended play Nadine Lustre under Viva Records which earned a gold certification from Philippine Association of the Record Industry (PARI).

In 2017, Lustre tapped into co-directing the music video of Reid's "The Life" with film director Petersen Vargas. The music video was released in December 2017. It won the Music Video of the Year award at the 2017 Myx Music Awards. Lustre's follow up project as a music video director came in January 2019 for her duet with Reid entitled "Summer". She shares directing credit for the video with Chino Villagracia of The Visual Club.

In 2019, Lustre joined music label Careless Records. She released her sophomore album Wildest Dreams on October 12, 2020, containing 12 tracks with singles including St4y Up, No 32 and I like It. After three years, she left Careless Records.

== Discography ==
=== Albums ===
List of albums, with selected details
Title	Album details
Wildest Dreams	Released: October 31, 2020 (PHL); Label: Careless, Hyphen

=== Mixtapes ===
List of mixtapes, with selected details
Title	Album details
Careless Mixtape (as part of Careless Music Artists)	Released: August 6, 2018 (PHL); Label: Careless; Format: Digital download, streaming

=== Collaborative albums ===
List of collaborative albums, with selected details
Title	Album details
Pop Girls (as part of Pop Girls)	Released: December 16, 2009; Label: Viva; Format: Digital download, CD

=== Soundtrack albums ===
List of soundtrack albums, with selected details
Title	Album details
Diary ng Panget	Released: March 26, 2014 (PHL); Label: Viva; Format: Digital download, CD, streaming
Never Not Love You	Released: March 27, 2018 (PHL); Viva; Format: Digital download, CD, streaming
Indak	Released: June 21, 2019 (PHL); Viva; Format: Digital download, CD, streaming

=== Extended plays ===
List of extended plays, with selected details and certifications
Title	Album details	Certifications
Nadine Lustre	Released: August 20, 2014 (PHL); Label: Viva; Format: Digital download, CD, streaming	PARI: Gold

=== Singles ===
==== As lead artist ====
List of singles as lead artist, showing year released and album name
Title	Year	Album
"No Erase" (with James Reid)	2014	Diary ng Panget
"Paligoy-ligoy"	2014	Diary ng Panget
"Para-paraan"	2014	Nadine Lustre
"Bahala Na" (with James Reid)	2014	Talk Back and You're Dead
"Mr. Antipatiko"	2014	Nadine Lustre
"Hanap-Hanap" (with James Reid)	2015	Reid Alert
"Me & You"	2015	Nadine Lustre
"Sa Ibang Mundo" (with Kean Cipriano)	2015	Philpop 2015
"On the Wings of Love" (with James Reid)	2015	On the Wings of Love
"This Time" (with James Reid)	2016	This Time
"Till I Met You"	2016	Till I Met You (with James Reid)
"St4y Up"	2018	Non-album single
"Prom" (with James Reid)	2018	Never Not Love You
"Summer" (with James Reid)	2018	Careless Mixtape
"Triangulo" (with Sam Concepcion and Nicole Omillo)	2019	Indak
"No 32" (with Ruby Ibarra)	2019	Non-album single
"Wildest Dreams"	2020	Wildest Dreams
"Wait for Me"	2021	Non-album single
"Overgrown"	2023	Non-album single
"Personal"	2026	Non-album single

==== As featured artist ====
List of singles as featured artist, showing year released and album name
Title	Year	Album
"Hush" (Yassi Pressman featuring Nadine Lustre)	2015	Yassi
"Nowhere I Wouldn't Go" (Kingwaw featuring Nadine Lustre)	2017	Island City Poems
"Headspace (Remix)" (Billy Davis featuring Nadine Lustre, Curtismith and Massiah)	2019	Non-album single
"Mashi Baeed" (Luka featuring Nadine Lustre)	2021	Mashi Baeed

=== Promotional singles ===
List of promotional singles, showing year released and album name
Title	Year	Album
"Thank You for the Love" (with James Reid, Daniel Padilla, Kathryn Bernardo, Liza Soberano, Enrique Gil, Bamboo and Elha Nympha)	2015	Non-album singles
"Kaya Mo" (with Mark Bautista, James Reid, Yassi Pressman, Donnalyn Bartolome, Thyro Alfaro, Yumi Lacsamana, Shehyee and Rico Blanco)	2016	Non-album singles
"Love Parade" (as part of Team Anne, Nadine and Ryan)	2017	Non-album singles
