= List of awards and nominations received by Nadine Lustre =

Filipino actress and singer (born 1993)

Nadine Lustre awards and nominations
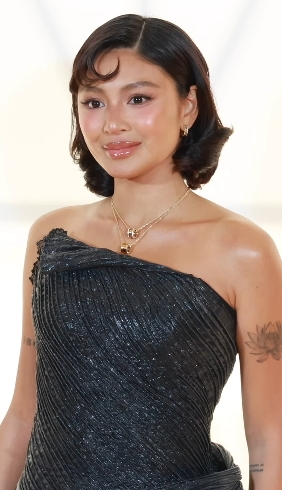
- Lustre at BVLGARI 2024
Awards and nominations
Award	Wins	Nominations

Totals (Note: Certain award groups do not simply award one winner. They acknowledge several different recipients, have runners-up, and have third place. Since this is a specific recognition and is different from losing an award, runner-up mentions are considered wins in this award tally. For simplification and to avoid errors, each award in this list has been presumed to have had a prior nomination.)
- Wins: 38
- Nominations: 21

Nadine Lustre is a Filipino-singer actress who has received various awards and nominations including six FAMAS Award, six Box Office Entertainment Awards, three Metro Manila Film Festival, a Gawad Urian Award a PMPC Star Awards for Movies, a PMPC Star Awards for Television, a Young Critics Circle Award and an Asian Academy Creative Awards.

Lustre's received critical acclaim for her performance in the novel adaptation, teen romance movie Para sa Hopeless Romantic (2015) and was nominated for the FAMAS Award for Best Actress. Her performance in the romantic drama Never Not Love You (2018) earned her three Best Actress awards at the Gawad Urian Award, FAMAS Award, Young Critics Circle Award and a Box Office Entertainment Award and nominations from PMPC Star Awards for Movies and The EDDYS award. On television, Lustre received four Box Office Entertainment Awards and was awarded with Princess of Philippine Television in the drama series On the Wings of Love (2015) and Till I Met You (2016).

In 2020, she starred in the coming of age, romantic drama Ulan (2019) where she won an Asian Academy Creative Awards for Best Actress in Regional category including nominations from FAMAS Award and Gawad Urian Award. For her performance in the psychological, horror thriller movie Deleter (2022), she received her Best Actress award at the 48th Metro Manila Film Festival and in the 2024 PMPC Star Awards for Movies and a nomination from Gawad Urian Award. The next year, she returned with another horror movie Greed (2023) and won her second FAMAS Award for Best Actress and received a nomination from The EDDYS Award.

As a recording artist, Lustre received several awards and nominations for her songs and albums including thirteen Myx Music Awards, two awards from Philippine Popular Music Festival, a PMPC Star Awards for Music, a SBS PopAsia Titanium Award and a nomination from MTV Europe Music Awards.

== Awards and nominations ==
=== Film ===
Award ceremony	Year	Category	Nominee / Work	Result	Ref.
Asian Academy Creative Awards	2019	Best Actress in a Leading Role (Regional Winner for the Philippines)	Ulan	Won	
Asian Academy Creative Awards	2019	Best Actress in a Leading Role	Ulan	Nominated	
Box Office Entertainment Awards	2025	Movie Supporting Actress of the Year	Uninvited	Won	
EDDYS Awards	2019	Best Actress	Never Not Love You	Nominated	
EDDYS Awards	2023	Best Actress	Greed	Nominated	
EDDYS Awards	2025	Best Supporting Actress	Uninvited	Nominated	
FAMAS Award	2016	Best Actress	Para sa Hopeless Romantic	Nominated	
FAMAS Award	2019	Best Actress	Never Not Love You	Won	
FAMAS Award	2020	Best Actress	Ulan	Nominated	
FAMAS Award	2023	Best Actress	Greed	Won	
FAMAS Award	2025	Best Supporting Actress	Uninvited	Won	
Gawad Tanglaw Awards	2025	Best Supporting Actress	Uninvited	Won	
Gawad Urian Awards	2019	Best Actress	Never Not Love You	Won	
Gawad Urian Awards	2020	Best Actress	Ulan	Nominated	
Gawad Urian Awards	2023	Best Actress	Deleter	Nominated	
GEMS – Hiyas Ng Sining Awards	2019	Best Actress	Never Not Love You	Nominated	
Metro Manila Film Festival	2022	Best Actress	Deleter	Won	
Metro Manila Film Festival	2024	Best Supporting Actress	Uninvited	Nominated	
Metro Manila Film Festival	2025	Best Actress	Call Me Mother	Nominated	
Philippine Arts, Film and Television Awards	2026	Best Supporting Actress	Uninvited	Nominated	
PMPC Star Awards for Movies	2019	Movie Actress of the Year	Never Not Love You	Nominated	
PMPC Star Awards for Movies	2024	Movie Actress of the Year	Deleter	Won	
PMPC Star Awards for Movies	2025	Movie Supporting Actress of the Year	Uninvited	Nominated	
PMPC Star Awards for Movies	2026	Movie Actress of the Year	Call Me Mother	Nominated	
Young Critics Circle	2019	Best Performance	Never Not Love You	Won	

=== Television ===
Award ceremony	Year	Category	Nominee / Work	Result	Ref.
Gawad Bedista Awards	2017	Actress of the Year (TV)	Till I Met You	Won	
Asian Academy Creative Awards	2026	Best Actress in a Leading Role (National Winner)	Love, Siargao	Won	
Platinum Stallion Media Awards	2019	Best TV Female Personality	Your Moment	Won	

=== Music ===
Award ceremony	Year	Category	Notable work/Recipient	Result	Ref.
MOR Pinoy Music Awards	2015	Best Collaboration	"No Erase" (with James Reid)	Won	
MTV Europe Music Awards	2015	Best Southeast Asian Act	Nadine Lustre	Nominated	
Myx Music Award	2015	Favorite Mellow Video	"Bahala Na"	Nominated	
Myx Music Award	2015	Favorite Media Soundtrack	"No Erase" (with James Reid)	Won	
Myx Music Award	2015	Favorite Song	"No Erase" (with James Reid)	Nominated	
Myx Music Award	2015	Favorite New Artist	Nadine Lustre	Nominated	
Myx Music Award	2016	Favorite Music Video	"Me and You"	Won	
Myx Music Award	2016	Favorite Song	"Me and You"	Won	
Myx Music Award	2016	Favorite Artist	Nadine Lustre	Won	
Myx Music Award	2016	Favorite Female Artist	Nadine Lustre	Won	
Myx Music Award	2016	Favorite Collaboration	"Hanap-Hanap" (with James Reid)	Won	
Myx Music Award	2016	Special Award: Best Music Video	"Me and You"	Nominated	
Myx Music Award	2017	Favorite Female Artist	Nadine Lustre	Won	
Myx Music Award	2017	Favorite Media Soundtrack	"This Time" (with James Reid)	Won	
Myx Music Award	2019	Music Video of the Year	"St4y Up"	Won	
Myx Music Award	2019	Female Artist of the Year	Nadine Lustre	Won	
Myx Music Award	2019	Artist of the Year	Nadine Lustre	Won	
Myx Music Award	2020	Music Video of the Year	"Summer" (with James Reid)	Won	
Myx Music Award	2021	Special Achievement Award	Wildest Dreams	Won	
Philippine Popular Music Festival	2015	People's Choice Award	"Sa Ibang Mundo"(with Kean Cipriano)	Won	
Philippine Popular Music Festival	2015	2nd Runner-up	"Sa Ibang Mundo"(with Kean Cipriano)	Won	
PMPC Star Awards for Music	2022	Album of the Year	Wildest Dreams	Nominated	
PMPC Star Awards for Music	2022	Dance Recording of the Year	"White Rabbit"	Nominated	
PMPC Star Awards for Music	2022	Pop Album of the Year	Wildest Dreams	Won	
SBS PopAsia	2015	Titanium Award	"Me and You"	Won	

=== Industry awards ===
Award ceremony	Year	Category	Notable work/Recipient	Result	Ref.
Box Office Entertainment Awards	2015	Most Popular Loveteam in Movies and TV	Nadine Lustre (with James Reid)	Won	
Box Office Entertainment Awards	2015	Female Face of the Night	Nadine Lustre	Won	
Box Office Entertainment Awards	2016	Princess of Philippine Television	On the Wings of Love	Won	
Box Office Entertainment Awards	2017	Princess of Philippine Television	Till I Met You	Won	
Box Office Entertainment Awards	2019	Most Popular Loveteam for Movies	Never Not Love You	Won	
FAMAS Award	2015	German Moreno Youth Achievement Award	Nadine Lustre	Won	
FAMAS Award	2023	Face of the Night	Nadine Lustre	Won	
FAMAS Award	2025	Star of the Night	Nadine Lustre	Won	
Gawad Bedista Awards	2017	Most Popular Loveteam	Nadine Lustre (with James Reid)	Won	
Golden Screen Awards	2026	Dekada Awardee	Never Not Love You	Won	
Metro Manila Film Festival Special Awards	2014	Face of the Night	Nadine Lustre	Won	
Metro Manila Film Festival Special Awards	2022	Star of the Night	Nadine Lustre	Won	
PMPC Star Awards for Movies	2016	Movie Love Team of the Year (with James Reid)	Para sa Hopeless Romantic	Nominated	
PMPC Star Awards for Movies	2017	Movie Love Team of the Year (with James Reid)	This Time	Nominated	
PMPC Star Awards for Movies	2019	Movie Love Team of the Year (with James Reid)	Never Not Love You	Nominated	
PMPC Star Awards for Movies	2021	Movie Love Team of the Year (with Carlo Aquino)	Ulan	Nominated	
PMPC Star Awards for Movies	2026	Takilya Queen	Call Me Mother	Won	
PMPC Star Awards for Television	2014	Female Star of the Night	Nadine Lustre	Won	

=== Popularity awards ===
Award ceremony	Year	Category	Notable work/Recipient	Result	Ref.
ASAP Pop Teen Choice Awards	2016	Pop Teen Love Team	Nadine Lustre (with James Reid)	Won	
ASAP Pop Teen Choice Awards	2016	Pop Fans Club	Nadine Lustre (with James Reid)	Nominated	
ASAP Pop Viewers' Choice Awards	2014	Pop Female Cutie	Nadine Lustre	Won	
ASAP Pop Viewers' Choice Awards	2014	Pop Loveteam	Nadine Lustre (with James Reid)	Nominated	
ASAP Pop Viewers' Choice Awards	2014	Pop Screen Kiss	Nadine Lustre (with James Reid)	Nominated	
ASAP Pop Viewers' Choice Awards	2014	Pop Fans Club	Nadine Lustre (with James Reid)	Nominated	
ASAP Pop Viewers' Choice Awards	2014	Pop Soundtrack Album	Diary ng Panget	Nominated	
Golden Laurel: Lycean Choice Media Awards	2016	Most Popular Loveteam	JaDine	Won	
Inside Showbiz Awards	2019	Favorite Movie Actress	Never Not Love You	Won	
Nickelodeon Kids' Choice Awards	2017	Favorite Pinoy Star	Nadine Lustre	Won	

=== Listicles ===
Publisher	Listicle	Year	Result	Ref.
FHM Philippines	100 Sexiest Women in the Philippines	2015	Rank 49	
FHM Philippines	100 Sexiest Women in the Philippines	2016	Rank 3	
FHM Philippines	100 Sexiest Women in the Philippines	2017	Rank 1	
Mega Magazine	The New PH Awards	2017	Millennial Multi-hyphenate	
Mega Magazine	Mega Fashion Awards	2021	Cover of the Year	
Tatler Philippines	Gen. T List	2021	Included	
Yes! Magazine	100 Most Beautiful Stars	2015	Included	
Yes! Magazine	100 Most Beautiful Stars	2016	Included	
