= Francis Pasion =

Filipino film director (1978–2016)

- Born: Francis Xavier E. Pasion; February 8, 1978; Manila, Philippines
- Died: March 6, 2016 (aged 38); Quezon City, Philippines
- Resting place: Loyola Memorial Chapels, Marikina
- Other name: FX
- Occupations: Film and television director
- Years active: 1999–2016
- Notable work: Jay, Bwaya, Princess and I, Dyesebel, My Binondo Girl, Nathaniel, On the Wings of Love

Francis Xavier E. Pasion, credited in movies and television as Francis Xavier Pasion or Francis Pasion, (February 8, 1978 – March 6, 2016) was a Filipino independent film and television drama director.

== Career ==
Pasion is a Cum Laude graduate of Major in Communication at the Ateneo de Manila University, where he founded the Loyola Film Circle in 1997, now the premier film organization of the university. He occasionally acts as a professor on independent films at the same university.

=== Film ===
Pasion started his career as a designer's apprentice for director Marilou Diaz-Abaya in the film Muro Ami in 1999, until he became a scriptwriter for movies Crying Ladies, Volta, and script consultant for Feng Shui, Milan.

In 2008, Pasion started as a film director with his first feature film "Jay" (as director and writer) which won multiple awards including Best Film, Best Actor (for Baron Geisler, Best Editing, and the Balanghai Trophy in the Cinemalaya Philippine Independent Film Festival. The film also premiered in the Orizzonti section of the Venice International Film Festival, screened and won several accolades from Gawad Urian, Busan, Berlin and other film festivals including the Special Mention award (New Visions category) in the 5th Bahamas International Film Festival. "Jay" is a film based on a story of a television documentary producer who documented the murder case of a gay school teacher, and starred by Geisler and Coco Martin.

In 2010, his second film, "Sampaguita, National Flower" was also won the Special Jury Prize in the Cinemalaya's New Breed category, Sampaguita was also selected as one of the films in the Hong Kong Asian Financing Forum in 2009 and participated in the New Currents section of the 2010 Pusan International Film Festival and in the Generation section of the 2011 Berlin International Film Festival.

Later in 2014, "Bwaya" (Crocodile) won the Best Film in the New Breed category, along with Best Cinematography and Best Musical Score awards, also from Cinemalaya. The following year, Bwaya won the prestigious Tokyo Filmex award and Cyclo D' Or (Golden Rickshaw) award from the Vesoul International Film Fest of Asian Cinema, held in France. Bwaya also competed in the 9th Five Flavors Film Festival held in Warsaw, Poland in November 2015.

Bwaya is a story of a mother who looked for her daughter that have killed by a giant deadly crocodile in the Agusan Marsh in Mindanao.

He is supposedly direct a film for 2017 Cinemalaya, entitled "My Positive Mother".

=== Television ===
Pasion started his career in television as a headwriter and producer of ABS-CBN's public service-drama program Nagmamahal, Kapamilya in 2006, and writer for drama anthology Maalaala Mo Kaya.

Among his notable ABS-CBN teleseryes that he directed are Sabel, My Binondo Girl, Kahit Konting Pagtingin, Princess and I, My Little Juan, Dyesebel, and Nathaniel.

His last television project was On the Wings of Love, starred by James Reid and Nadine Lustre, collectively known as "JaDine", which ended on February 26, 2016, 9 days before his death.

== Filmography ==
=== Film ===
Year	Title	Role
1999	Muro-Ami	Designer's apprentice
2003	Crying Ladies	Additional scenes and Dialogue
2003	Kung Ako na Lang Sana	Script consultant
2004	My First Romance	Script consultant
2004	All My Life	Script consultant
2004	Feng Shui	Script consultant
2004	Milan	Creative consultant
2008	Jay	Director, producer, and writer
2010	Noy	Story
2010	Sampaguita: National Flower	Director
2014	Bwaya	Director, producer and writer

=== Television ===
Year	Title	Role	Network	Notes
2004–2008	Maalaala Mo Kaya	Writer	ABS-CBN	
2006	Sa Piling Mo	Writer	ABS-CBN	
2006	Nagmamahal, Kapamilya	Writer	ABS-CBN	
2008	Volta	Writer	ABS-CBN	
2009	Project Runway Philippines	Creative Concept Team member	ETC	
2010	Gimik 2010	Director	ABS-CBN	
2010	Your Song (Beautiful Lady, Maling Akala, Andi)	Director	ABS-CBN	
2010–2011	Sabel	Director	ABS-CBN	
2011–2012	My Binondo Girl	Director	ABS-CBN	
2011–2015	Wansapanataym	Director	ABS-CBN	
2012–2013	Princess and I	Director	ABS-CBN	
2013	Kahit Konting Pagtingin	Director	ABS-CBN	
2013	My Little Juan	Director	ABS-CBN	
2014	Dyesebel	Director	ABS-CBN	
2015	Nathaniel	Director	ABS-CBN	
2015–2016	On the Wings of Love	Director	ABS-CBN	Last television project

== Death ==
Pasion was found dead in his home in Brgy. Laging Handa, Quezon City on March 6, 2016. His lifeless body was found by his parents inside the bathroom of Pasion's house. Initial findings by the PNP-Scene of the Crime Operations (SOCO) showed that Pasion died due to heart attack. The director also reportedly, suffered chest pains. His body is observed in the PNP Crime Laboratory for further autopsy, and then cremated.
