= Nadine Lustre (EP) =

2014 EP by Nadine Lustre

- Standard cover

EP by Nadine Lustre
- Released: August 20, 2014
- Recorded: 2014
- Genre: Pop; R&B; OPM
- Length: 17:58
- Language: Tagalog; English
- Label: Viva

Nadine Lustre chronology
Diary ng Panget (2014)	Nadine Lustre (2014)	Never Not Love You (2018)

Singles from Nadine Lustre
- 1. "Para-paraan" Released: August 8, 2014; 2. "Bahala Na" Released: August 15, 2014; 3. "Mr. Antipatiko" Released: November 21, 2014; 4. "Me & You" Released: May 6, 2015

Nadine Lustre is the self-titled debut solo extended play by Filipina singer-actress Nadine Lustre. It was released on August 20, 2014 in digital platforms, two weeks before physical release by Viva Records. It contains five original songs, four songs in Tagalog and one song in English.

== Background ==
Fresh from the success of her breakthrough role in Viva Film's Diary ng Panget (2014), Lustre released her self-titled debut EP which featured youthful, bubblegum pop songs. It featured tracks written by songwriters Thyro Alfaro, Yumi Lacsamana, Pow Chavez, Bojam de Belen, Paulo Madrid, and Gianina Camille del Rosario. Most of the songs in the EP were used in the soundtrack of Lustre's film Talk Back and You're Dead.

== Release and promotion ==
=== Singles ===
"Para-paraan" was released as the lead single of the EP on August 8, 2014 along with a music video on YouTube. It was also one of the tracks played in her movie, along with on and off-screen partner, James Reid, Talk Back and You're Dead, which was released in cinemas nationwide on August 20, 2014. The music video has James and Nadine dancing with each other in front of a green-screen. "Bahala Na" was released as the second single of the album on August 15, 2014 along with a music on YouTube. It is a duet performed alongside James Reid. It is the official soundtrack of their movie, Talk Back and You're Dead. "Mr. Antipatiko" was released as the third single on November 21, 2014. James Reid also makes a guest cameo appearance in the official music video of the song. "Me & You", the only English track off the album, was released as the fourth and final single of the album on May 6, 2015.

== Critical reception ==
The reviews for the album have generally been positive and a taste of fresh songs in the Philippine music industry. Chito Bakamo of Wordpress has stated; "The first time I saw Nadine Lustre sa Diary Ng Panget, she is sooooo funny. Tawa ako ng tawa (I laughed so much). Then i heard her sing sa soundtrack, sounds amazing and i fall in love sa kanya (in a big fan level). Now, she got her own album simply titled “Nadine Lustre” and its really worthy. Alam kong lima lang ang tracks nitong album na ito pero she made my head bang (I know that this album only has five tracks, but she made my head bang). To the dance tracks “Para-Paraan” which is so teen pop and “Me & You”, the only English song, to “Mr. Antipatiko” and “Aba Bakit Hindi?” na super kilig ang lyrics (yup call me corny but this song i really like) and “Bahala Na” that gives you na meron talagang forever. Hahaha! Wagi itong album na ito para sa akin."

== Track listing ==
No.	Title	Writer(s)	Length
1.	"Para-paraan"	Pow Chavez	3:02
2.	"Bahala Na" (featuring James Reid)	Thyro Alfaro, Yumi Lacsamana	3:18
3.	"Mr. Antipatiko"	Bojam de Belen, Paulo Madrid	3:33
4.	"Aba, Bakit Hindi?"	Alfaro, Lacsamana	3:08
5.	"Me & You"	Gianina Camille del Rosario	4:34
Total length:			17:58
