= List of On the Wings of Love episodes =

On the Wings of Love is a 2015 Philippine romantic comedy television series directed by Antoinette Jadaone and Jojo Saguin and starring James Reid and Nadine Lustre in their first primetime television series. The series premiered on ABS-CBN's Primetime Bida evening block and worldwide on The Filipino Channel on August 10, 2015, replacing Bridges of Love.

The romantic comedy centers around two different people — Leah, a simple girl with an American dream; and Clark, a boy living his American life — who are forced to marry in order to legally stay and continue working in the United States.

The show ended on February 26, 2016, and this episode was divided into two parts: a recorded segment and followed by a live viewing party in Ynares Center, Antipolo. It was also simulcasted live on ABS-CBN and worldwide on The Filipino Channel.

A TV special, "On the Wings of Love: Achieved! from Reel to Real" aired on February 28, 2016, that chronicles the production of this show and the blossoming of the relationship of James Reid and Nadine Lustre as a couple. It was hosted by Robi Domingo and Gretchen Ho.

Mega Manila ratings are provided by AGB Nielsen Philippines while the nationwide ratings are provided by Kantar Media Philippines.

== Series overview ==
Month	Episodes	Monthly Averages	
Month	Episodes	Mega Manila	Nationwide
August 2015	16	18.61%	22.63%
September 2015	22	18.53%	22.15%
October 2015	22	18.61%	22.05%
November 2015	21	16.89%	20.93%
December 2015	23	14.45%	19.11%
January 2016	21	13.81%	18.17%
February 2016	20	16.43%	21.24%
Total	145	16.76%	20.90%

== Episodes ==
=== August 2015 ===
#	Episode	Original Air Date	Summary	Mega Manila			Nationwide			Ref.
#	Episode	Original Air Date	Summary	Rating	Timeslot Rank	Primetime Rank	Rating	Timeslot Rank	Primetime Rank	Ref.
1	"Arrival"	August 10, 2015	Leah Olivar is applying for her temporary visa at the Embassy to travel to the United States for the International Youth Chorale competition. Leah's mother died when she was young, but they were unable to afford to bring her back to the Philippines to bury her. Leah wants to visit her mother's grave and fulfill the American dream while she is there for the competition. Leah and her boyfriend Jigs broke up as a result of his visa application denial. Meanwhile, in San Francisco, Clark Medina is working to support his family in the Philippines and dreams of becoming a permanent American citizen.	19.3%	#1	#4	22.1%	#1	#4	
2	"I Love USA"	August 11, 2015	Leah and Clark run into each other on the street for the first time as Leah explores San Francisco. Meanwhile, in the Philippines, Jigs tries to apologize to Leah but he learns she has already left for America. He sends his mom, Jack, who lives in San Francisco, to show her around and take care of Leah.	18.6%	#1	#6	22.5%	#1	#4	
3	"American Dream"	August 12, 2015	Leah asks for Tita Jack's help to look for her mother's grave but they are unable to locate it. After Leah's group won 4th place in the competition, she decides to extend her stay in America to look for her mother's grave and a job, and stays with Tita Jack in the meantime. Clark gets chased by the loan shark Barra Cuda as he struggles to keep up with expenses.	17.8%	#1	#6	21.1%	#1	#4	
4	"Pusong OFW"	August 13, 2015	Tita Jack continues to help Leah adjust to life in America as an immigrant worker. She allows Leah to work with her so Leah can begin to earn money. After she earns her first American dollars, Leah is determined to find more work. She struggles to stay determined without her family by her side.	16.7%	#1	#7	21.5%	#1	#4	
5	"The Meetup"	August 14, 2015	Leah becomes desperate as her temporary visa is about to expire. Leah and Tita Jack begin to interview people for Leah to marry for a green card, but none of them pan out. Tita Jack suggests for her to marry Clark instead since he needs the money. Tatang Sol finds out the reason for his chest pains and hides it from his family because the operation is expensive.	18.2%	#2	#6	24.3%	#1	#4	
6	"Marry Me"	August 17, 2015	Leah and Clark meet again and disagree on getting married because of their past encounters. Leah looks for other options but they are all unsuccessful. After Barra Cuda comes looking for Clark again, Clark realizes he needs the money and Leah needs the green card to avoid becoming an illegal immigrant. They agree to the marriage and Tita Jack helps them make their marriage more convincing. Jigs becomes even more angry when he finds out Leah will be marrying his cousin, Clark.	17.9%	#1	#6	22.4%	#1	#4	
7	"Don't Fall in Love"	August 18, 2015	Leah and Clark endure their first test – convincing Tita Jack's friends that they are truly engaged out of love. Tita Jack also instructs them to start living together at Clark's apartment to make their marriage convincing and help them get to know each other. At home, Tatang Sol is experiencing heart pains but hides his checkup results from his daughters.	18.5%	#1	#5	21.8%	#1	#4	
8	"I Do or I Don't"	August 19, 2015	Jigs threatens Clark to make sure Clark knows Leah is still his, even if they have broken up. Leah struggles to feel comfortable in her new home. She is worried that even with their efforts, they may not pass the immigration interviews. Tatang Sol collapses at home and is taken to the hospital, so Leah is motivated again to try everything to stay in America so she can provide for her family back home.	20.4%	#1	#5	25.8%	#1	#4	
9	"Kasal-kasalan"	August 20, 2015	Clark and Leah head to the courthouse to get married. They combined their wedding reception with Tita Jack's birthday party. Leah's sister Tiffany finds out about Leah's wedding through FaceGram and Leah begs her not to tell their father.	18.1%	#1	#6	21.4%	#1	#5	
10	"Mr. and Mrs."	August 21, 2015	Leah explains to Tiffany why she married. To avoid being charged with fraud, Leah and Clark continue to get to know each other through Tita Jack's assignments. Leah begins working at her new job and learns how hard it is in America without a green card.	20.3%	#1	#4	25.3%	#1	#4	
11	"Achieve"	August 24, 2015	Tita Jack gives an assignment to Leah and Clark to get to know each other. Tiffany finds out about the medical cost estimate for Tatang Sol's heart bypass surgery. They agree not to tell Leah so she will not overwork herself. Leah continues to visit cemeteries around San Francisco to find her mother's grave. After pulling a dangerous prank on Leah, Clark feels bad and learns how important a green card is for Leah, so he begins to take their studying seriously.	19.9%	#1	#6	23.5%	#1	#5	
12	"I'm Sorry"	August 25, 2015	Clark and Leah attend their first interview with the immigration officers. It ends on a bad note when Leah stated Clark's father was dead, since Clark did not tell her the truth. Clark refuses to tell Leah what happened with his father and it causes them to fight. Leah leaves the apartment and sleeps in the park until Clark finds her and saves her from a police officer's interrogation.	18.6%	#1	#6	22.5%	#1	#4	
13	"Truth or Consequence"	August 26, 2015	Tiffany enlists the help of the neighbors at Tenement Uno to raise money for Tatang Sol's heart operation, against Tatang Sol's wishes. Leah decides to use Truth or Dare to get to know Clark and his history with his father. Clark has a dream about him expressing his feelings to Leah.	18.0%	#1	#6	21.6%	#1	#4	
14	"Big Heart"	August 27, 2015	Leah continues to try to get to know Clark. He finally tells her the story behind the lack of relationship with his father. This brings the two closer together. Meanwhile, Tenement Uno plans a benefit concert for Tatang Sol's heart operation expenses.	18.5%	#1	#6	21.8%	#1	#5	
15	"Hindi Pwede"	August 28, 2015	The immigration officer visits the apartment for an impromptu interview. Leah begins to have feelings for Clark but tries to avoid it after Tita Jack reminds her she cannot fall in love with Clark because he is Jigs’ cousin.	18.0%	#2	#7	21.8%	#1	#5	
16	"Hubby, Wifey"	August 31, 2015	Tita Jack continues to remind Clark and Leah about the marriage being strictly a business deal, because Jigs is still upset about the marriage. Tita Jack leaves to the Philippines after Jigs gets into an accident, so Clark and Leah are forced to attend Tita Jack's friend's party without her.	19.0%	#1	#6	22.7%	#1	#4	

=== September 2015 ===
#	Episode	Original Air Date	Summary	Mega Manila			Nationwide			Ref.
#	Episode	Original Air Date	Summary	Rating	Timeslot Rank	Primetime Rank	Rating	Timeslot Rank	Primetime Rank	Ref.
17	"Fairy Tale"	September 1, 2015	Jigs continues to push away his mother out of his frustrations with Leah and Clark. Tenement Uno continues to raise money for their benefit concert and plan to invite a celebrity. Leah continues to push away her feelings for Clark.	18.6%	#1	#5	21.9%	#1	#5	
18	"Hangover"	September 2, 2015	Leah still finds it difficult to push away her growing feelings for Clark. Tiffany continues to try and get a celebrity to attend their benefit concert.	18.3%	#1	#6	22.4%	#1	#4	
19	"Believe"	September 3, 2015	Leah takes care of Clark when he does not feel well. Clark and Leah get called in for a second interview with the immigration officers. Their answers match up but the officer says he does not notice normal intimacy between them. The benefit concert is held at Tenement Uno and they were able to raise enough money for the operation.	20.7%	#1	#4	21.8%	#1	#4	
20	"Angel"	September 4, 2015	Tita Jack reveals her orientation at their family party and it makes Jigs even more upset when he finds out. Clark becomes more supportive, making it harder for Leah to push away her feelings. She finds it difficult since she promised Tita Jack that she would not fall in love with Clark.	17.7%	#1	#6	20.6%	#1	#4	
21	"I'm Here"	September 7, 2015	Leah finds herself in a dangerous part of the neighborhood and Clark comes to her rescue. Tita Jack is still having trouble connecting with Jigs and continues to feel distant. Leah begins to think her mother may be alive still.	18.8%	#1	#6	22.5%	#1	#5	
22	"Surprise"	September 8, 2015	Tiffany's son Gabby becomes sick with dengue and is sent to the hospital. They use some of the money from Tatang Sol's operation funds for Gabby so they do not have to bother Leah. Leah decides to go visit her mother's last employer in Napa Valley to find out where her mother was buried, so Clark borrow Cullen's car to take her there.	17.6%	#2	#6	21.7%	#1	#5	
23	"Most Kilig Night"	September 9, 2015	Clark and Leah are stranded in Napa Valley after the car breaks down. A local lets them stay at his family's home for the night. Meanwhile, Gabby needs to be sent to the ICU for a blood transfusion, so the family begins to search for blood donors.	18.3%	#2	#6	22.9%	#1	#3	
24	"Guilty"	September 10, 2015	Tita Jack begins to connect with Jigs and tries to bond with him while she is home. Leah and Clark visit Leah's mother's former employer, who had no idea that Leah's mother died, causing her to believe that she may still be alive.	18.1%	#2	#8	21.8%	#1	#5	
25	"Hold My Hand"	September 11, 2015	Tita Jack shows up to the bar where Jigs is hanging out with his friends and begins to bond with him. Gabby's sickness gets better after the residents at Tenement Uno gather to donate blood for him. Leah is sad after finding out about Tatang Sol's pending heart operation, so Clark takes her out and they begin to grow closer.	19.6%	#1	#6	24.3%	#1	#5	
26	"In Denial"	September 14, 2015	The immigration officer arrives for the final interview in the middle of the night. Jigs sees that Leah and Clark are getting closer but Tita Jack tries to reassure him that they promised they would get a divorce. Leah posts a picture of her mother on FaceGram in hopes of finding her.	18.0%	#2	#8	21.3%	#1	#5	
27	"Mr. and Mrs. Pizza"	September 15, 2015	Leah overworks herself and gets sick as a result. Clark takes care of her and goes to work for her while she rests. Leah realizes how much Clark cares for her. Clark sells a furniture piece and assists Leah with saving money for Tatang Sol's operation without her knowing.	18.7%	#1	#6	22.1%	#1	#5	
28	"Selos"	September 16, 2015	Tatang Sol has a successful heart bypass operation. Tita Jack tries to help Jigs keep his mind off Leah but he still insists on going to America to win Leah back. Clark goes to a meeting with a potential client and Leah gets jealous, thinking he is going on a date.	18.3%	#2	#6	22.1%	#1	#5	
29	"Most Approved Kiss"	September 17, 2015	Leah plays off her jealousy as anger that Clark could endanger their chances at her green card. Jigs gets approved for a temporary visa so he plans to surprise Leah. Leah and Clark receive notice that she has been approved for a green card. Leah tries to change the topic every time Clark tries to bring up how he feels.	18.9%	#1	#6	24.8%	#1	#4	
30	"Hesitations"	September 18, 2015	Clark takes Leah with him to Carmel to clean a client's home, since his friend Cullen is unable to go with him. Leah continues to try to push Clark away because of their promise to Tita Jack.	19.0%	#1	#6	21.9%	#1	#5	
31	"Sweetest Moment"	September 21, 2015	Leah convinces Clark to go on a date but she ends up becoming jealous and follows him to spy. Leah starts to realize she may really be in love with Clark.	18.6%	#1	#5	21.6%	#1	#5	
32	"Fantasy"	September 22, 2015	Tatang Sol continues to recover from his heart bypass operation. Clark takes out Leah to celebrate her green card. They continue to connect, and Clark enlists the help of his friends to surprise Leah.	16.2%	#1	#6	21.4%	#1	#5	
33	"Sweetest Surprise"	September 23, 2015	Clark takes out Leah on a special prom night just for her with the help of their friends and coworkers. He gives her a handmade treasure box as a gift to hold her valuables. Tita Jack tells Clark that Jigs will be coming back to America with her and he fears it will ruin his relationship with Leah.	19.5%	#1	#6	23.4%	#1	#5	
34	"Complicated"	September 24, 2015	Leah receives her green card in the mail but finds it difficult to get an office job. Tita Jack and Jigs go visit Tatang Sol in the hospital. Tita Jack realizes she knows the doctor's cousin and is able to get the expenses lifted for Tatang Sol's operation.	19.6%	#2	#7	21.3%	#1	#5	
35	"Distance"	September 25, 2015	Leah expresses she is going to miss their marriage and Clark comforts her. Tita Jack and Jigs head to America and Jigs surprises Leah. Tatang Sol is discharged from the hospital and returns home.	18.7%	#2	#7	22.6%	#1	#5	
36	"Hadlang"	September 28, 2015	Jigs keeps pushing them to get their divorce now that Leah has her green card. Clark becomes distant because he believes their relationship is over now that Jigs is there. Tolayts tries to make Tiffany jealous by talking to the new tenant Sasha.	18.5%	#1	#5	21.4%	#1	#5	
37	"Changes"	September 29, 2015	Leah continues to have guilt for hiding her marriage from her father. Tita Jack helps plan how Clark and Leah's divorce will play out. Clark continues to be distant from their Leah so that it will not be so hard to leave her.	17.7%	#2	#7	21.5%	#1	#5	
38	"Game of Love"	September 30, 2015	Clark and Leah attend the OFW gathering with Tita Jack and Jigs. They still have to act married but this upsets Jigs. They are ready to talk about the divorce but Jigs shows up to the apartment.	18.3%	#1	#6	22.1%	#1	#5	

=== October 2015 ===
#	Episode	Original Air Date	Summary	Mega Manila			Nationwide			Ref.
#	Episode	Original Air Date	Summary	Rating	Timeslot Rank	Primetime Rank	Rating	Timeslot Rank	Primetime Rank	Ref.
39	"The Aminan Night"	October 1, 2015	Jigs stays at the apartment to keep Clark and Leah apart. While everyone prays on Leah's mother's death anniversary, meanwhile she is in America and finds out her husband has died. Since Clark and Leah are always interrupted by Jigs, Cullen and Monette make a plan to get them together and talk about their true feelings.	17.9%	#1	#7	19.6%	#1	#5	
40	"Push for Love"	October 2, 2015	Clark tells Tita Jack about how he feels about Leah and after her reaction, he begins to think maybe it is the wrong time for them. Leah's mother Rona finds out her husband did not leave any money behind for her and their son Brent.	17.2%	#1	#7	20.8%	#1	#5	
41	"I Love You"	October 5, 2015	Clark and Leah decide to go through with the divorce because of the promises they made to Tita Jack. They are both hurt after their staged fight. Jigs finds them still together that night and gets in a fight with Clark.	20.1%	#1	#5	22.9%	#1	#5	
42	"Fight for Love"	October 6, 2015	Leah struggles to stay close to Clark because of her guilt due to breaking the promise to Tita Jack. Rona and Brent move to San Francisco, and Rona shows up at Leah's apartment. Leah is upset after finding out the truth and Clark fails to stop her from going back home to the Philippines.	20.5%	#1	#4	24.0%	#1	#5	
43	"Start Over"	October 7, 2015	Leah returns home but fails to tell Tatang Sol the real reason behind it. Jigs is upset about Leah leaving and wants to follow her.	19.5%	#1	#3	22.4%	#1	#5	
44	"Hopeful"	October 8, 2015	Diana, Clark's client, wants Clark to go to Manila to monitor his furniture designs and look at the space for the Sun and Moon Cafe. Leah begins to look for jobs again. Rona visits the apartment and explains her story to Clark.	20.1%	#1	#5	22.0%	#1	#5	
45	"Welcome Home Clark"	October 9, 2015	Clark flies to the Philippines to begin his project with the Sun and Moon Cafe but does not plan to tell Leah he is there. Jigs learns how hard it is to work in America. Tolayts continues to try to get Tiffany's attention by using Sasha.	21.7%	#1	#4	24.2%	#1	#5	
46	"From a Distance"	October 12, 2015	Clark begins looking for carpenters to work with him on the cafe furniture. He hires Axel and Kiko and they go with him to visit Leah's neighborhood but Clark does not show himself.	18.7%	#1	#6	24.1%	#1	#5	
47	"Reunited"	October 13, 2015	Axel and Kiko convince Clark to go look for Leah but the neighbors start to think they are thieves, so Axel reveals Clark is Leah's husband. Leah is forced to reveal her marriage to her father but does not tell him they did it for a green card.	19.5%	#2	#7	23.4%	#1	#5	
48	"Love Drunk"	October 14, 2015	Tatang Sol decides he wants to get to know Clark since he is part of the family now, by putting him through a drinking test.	18.3%	#2	#7	23.5%	#1	#5	
49	"Igib ng Pag-ibig"	October 15, 2015	Jigs finds a new job in San Francisco but then finds out Clark went back to the Philippines and decides he wants to go back too. Clark continues to try and impress Tatang Sol.	18.9%	#1	#4	22.6%	#1	#5	
50	"Biyaheng Pag-ibig"	October 16, 2015	Clark explains to Tita Jack that he returned to the Philippines for work. He starts to bond with the neighbors at Tenement Uno and spends his weekends there. Tatang Sol begins to accept Clark after seeing all of the things he's doing for the family, including driving the jeep for him.	19.2%	#1	#6	21.7%	#1	#5	
51	"Tough Love"	October 19, 2015	Tita Jack refuses to help Jigs fly back to the Philippines so he finds other ways to get money. Leah struggles to be with Clark because she feels guilty and does not want to break up his family.	17.1%	#1	#7	18.2%	#1	#6	
52	"Pursue"	October 20, 2015	Leah continues to try to find a job so she can provide for her family. Jigs cancels his flight to the Philippines to help care for Tita Jack's back injury. Tatang Sol continues to try and find out why Tiffany and Leah are sad.	17.3%	#1	#6	18.3%	#1	#6	
53	"Confession"	October 21, 2015	Jigs goes to work for Tita Jack since she is still injured. Tatang Sol invites Clark to stay for the festival. Leah tries to push away Clark by revealing to Tatang Sol that her marriage was initially fixed for a green card.	17.7%	#1	#5	20.4%	#1	#5	
54	"Hot Seat"	October 22, 2015	Tatang Sol accepts the fact that Leah initially had a fixed marriage and insists they mend their marriage if their love is real. Leah is still hurt from her mom's actions and fears Clark will leave her too. The neighbors and Tatang Sol convince Clark to enter the Mr. Tenement 2015 contest.	16.5%	#1	#7	20.7%	#1	#5	
55	"Too Good"	October 23, 2015	Tenement Uno works hard to prepare for Clark and Tolayts for the Mr. Tenement contest. Clark and Leah spend more time together since Tatang Sol wants Clark at the house more often.	18.0%	#1	#6	21.4%	#1	#5	
56	"Happy Times"	October 26, 2015	Jigs worries that Clark and Leah are getting close. Clark reveals to Lola Pachang that he is mending his marriage and will not divorce Leah. Clark continues to try to make Leah happy by picking her up from work and spend time with her on his free time.	19.1%	#1	#6	22.3%	#1	#5	
57	"Ginoong Tenement"	October 27, 2015	Jigs grows closer with Tita Jack. The Mr. Tenement 2015 competition has arrived and Clark wins for Tenement Uno. Clark gives some of his winnings to help with Leah's family expenses.	19.0%	#1	#6	25.3%	#1	#5	
58	"Hero"	October 28, 2015	While the neighbors are celebrating their tenement's win, Bebeng and Tonyo's house catches on fire. Clark runs in to rescue Bebeng. Leah realizes how much she cares for him after thinking he was gone. Tatang Sol finally grants his approval of Clark.	18.5%	#1	#4	23.2%	#1	#5	
59	"Approval"	October 29, 2015	Tita Jack and Rona meet for the first time. Tita Jack tries to keep Jigs occupied and encourages him to go out on dates. Leah tries to help Clark understand why her mother's actions are affecting her feelings for their relationship, but he will not give up.	16.6%	#2	#7	21.6%	#1	#5	
60	"Trust Me"	October 30, 2015	Leah decides to give her bird Mekeni to Tolayts. Jigs meets Maggie, Tita Jack's friend's niece, who is also heartbroken. Leah finally admits she still has feelings for Clark but continues to push him away.	18.0%	#2	#7	22.5%	#1	#5	

=== November 2015 ===
#	Episode	Original Air Date	Summary	Mega Manila			Nationwide			Ref.
#	Episode	Original Air Date	Summary	Rating	Timeslot Rank	Primetime Rank	Rating	Timeslot Rank	Primetime Rank	Ref.
61	"Miss You"	November 2, 2015	Diana's daughter, Angela, starts to work with them on the Sun and Moon Cafe design. Leah is still having trouble committing to Clark. Leah's idea for the new campaign is stolen by a senior copywriter.	18.7%	#1	#4	21.8%	#1	#5	
62	"Happy CLeah Day"	November 3, 2015	Jigs and Maggie begin to bond. Leah and Clark explore Manila to help find inspiration for the Sun and Moon Cafe decor.	18.0%	#1	#6	21.4%	#1	#5	
63	"Manila in Love"	November 4, 2015	Tolayts continues to try to win over Tiffany. Rona sends an email to Leah and Tatang Sol almost reads it. Tiffany sees Adrian, Gabby's father, at the tenement.	16.9%	#1	#6	21.3%	#1	#5	
64	"Back to You"	November 5, 2015	Adrian tries to talk to Tiffany about coming back into her and Gabby's life and this worries Tolayts. Jigs and Maggie help each other get over their heartbreak.	16.9%	#2	#7	20.6%	#1	#6	
65	"Love Shots"	November 6, 2015	Clark and Leah help out Leah's coworker with a wedding photoshoot. Tatang Sol questions Adrian's intentions for his return. Leah finally gets recognized for her campaign idea.	18.4%	#1	#6	21.7%	#1	#5	
66	"Wish"	November 9, 2015	Jigs is finally becoming more positive, going out with Maggie, and gets Employee of the Month. Adrian and Tolayts fight for Tiffany and Gabby's attention.	17.2%	#2	#7	21.3%	#1	#6	
67	"Finally Yours"	November 10, 2015	Tiffany decides to introduce Adrian to Gabby as his father. Clark starts to get frustrated with Leah pushing him away so she finally decides to take a chance with him.	17.4%	#2	#7	20.8%	#1	#6	
68	"Harana"	November 11, 2015	Jigs blames Nanang Rona for Leah leaving America. Leah and Clark start to grow closer again now that Leah is committed.	17.2%	#2	#6	22.0%	#1	#5	
69	"Lucky"	November 12, 2015	Clark wants to plan something special for Leah. Tolayts and Adrian continue to fight over Gabby and Tiffany's attention.	15.6%	#2	#8	20.0%	#1	#7	
70	"Secret"	November 13, 2015	Jigs and Maggie bond more over drinking. Nanang Rona calls Leah and Tatang Sol picks up. Clark becomes secretive from Leah to work on his special surprise, but she starts to worry when she hears a girl coworker at the cafe and hears he was at the mall.	16.7%	#2	#7	21.9%	#1	#5	
71	"Crazy Love"	November 16, 2015	The Sun and Moon Cafe has its grand opening. Leah starts to become jealous of Angela after meeting her.	17.0%	#2	#8	21.5%	#1	#5	
72	"Destination Love"	November 17, 2015	Clark talks to Tita Jack and comes clean that he has been seeing Leah and she gives her support. Clark and Leah's families travel to Batangas for Clark's prize from the Mr. Tenement contest.	16.4%	#2	#6	21.3%	#1	#5	
73	"Dream Love"	November 18, 2015	Adrian shows up uninvited to the family vacation. Jigs finds another job and Tita Jack hides Clark and Leah's relationship from him. Leah fears Clark keeps sneaking away on his phone to talk to Angela.	17.4%	#2	#7	19.9%	#1	#5	
74	"The Proposal"	November 19, 2015	Clark enlists the help of their families for his surprise proposal to Leah.	16.7%	#2	#8	20.1%	#1	#6	
75	"Backslide"	November 20, 2015	Jigs finds out about Clark and Leah and their plan for a church wedding and plans to go back to the Philippines to stop it. Tatang Sol tells Clark he needs to formally ask for Leah's hand in marriage - pamamanhikan.	16.5%	#2	#8	21.8%	#1	#5	
76	"Plans"	November 23, 2015	Jigs fails to get on the plane without his passport and finds out Maggie hid it. Clark and Leah's families begin preparing for the pamamanhikan.	16.2%	#2	#7	19.8%	#1	#5	
77	"The Ex Is Back"	November 24, 2015	Jigs surprises everyone when he comes home. He begs Leah and her family to win her back. As Jigs and Clark begin to fight, Lola Pachang has a stroke and gets sent to the hospital.	15.3%	#2	#8	20.2%	#1	#5	
78	"Face Off"	November 25, 2015	Jigs blames Clark for Lola's stroke. Tita Jack comes home to visit Lola and tries to keep Jigs and Clark from fighting.	15.7%	#2	#7	20.6%	#1	#5	
79	"Torn"	November 26, 2015	Tolayts plans to return to school to have a better future and try to win over Tiffany. Leah tells Jigs they are over and he is hurt, causing tension in the house. Clark decides to leave and live in the woodshop.	17.5%	#2	#6	20.6%	#1	#6	
80	"Pamamanhikan"	November 27, 2015	The day for pamamanhikan has arrived. Jigs still wants to fight for Leah and break up her marriage to Clark.	16.3%	#2	#7	21.1%	#1	#6	
81	"Trouble"	November 30, 2015	Both families are experiencing frustration because of their different backgrounds. Clark and Leah worry this will ruin their chance at marriage.	16.6%	#2	#8	19.8%	#1	#5	

=== December 2015 ===
#	Episode	Original Air Date	Mega Manila			Nationwide			Ref.
#	Episode	Original Air Date	Rating	Timeslot Rank	Primetime Rank	Rating	Timeslot Rank	Primetime Rank	Ref.
82	"Pag-ibig Feels"	December 1, 2015	16.6%	#2	#8	21.0%	#1	#5	
83	"Meet the New Boss"	December 2, 2015	16.4%	#2	#7	20.8%	#1	#5	
84	"Simon Says"	December 3, 2015	15.8%	#2	#9	20.9%	#1	#5	
85	"Perception"	December 4, 2015	16.2%	#2	#8	20.8%	#1	#6	
86	"Remedy"	December 7, 2015	15.8%	#2	#9	20.1%	#1	#5	
87	"Timeless"	December 8, 2015	16.6%	#2	#7	20.7%	#1	#5	
88	"Cherish"	December 9, 2015	15.3%	#2	#9	20.3%	#1	#5	
89	"Related"	December 10, 2015	16.0%	#2	#8	21.1%	#1	#5	
90	"Real"	December 11, 2015	15.0%	#2	#9	20.0%	#1	#6	
91	"Desperate Move"	December 14, 2015	15.5%	#2	#10	18.4%	#1	#8	
92	"Threat"	December 15, 2015	14.1%	#2	#10	17.2%	#1	#8	
93	"Laban"	December 16, 2015	15.5%	#2	#9	17.7%	#1	#7	
94	"Start Up"	December 17, 2015	14.4%	#2	#9	16.7%	#2	#9	
95	"Preparations"	December 18, 2015	13.9%	#2	#9	17.7%	#1	#6	
96	"Push"	December 21, 2015	13.4%	#2	#10	20.1%	#1	#5	
97	"Love Rush"	December 22, 2015	14.6%	#2	#10	18.2%	#1	#8	
98	"Christmas Gift"	December 23, 2015	14.1%	#2	#9	19.3%	#1	#5	
99	"Christmas Surprise"	December 24, 2015	11.6%	#2	#9	18.5%	#1	#4	
100	"Christmas Wish"	December 25, 2015	10.6%	#2	#8	14.9%	#1	#6	
101	"Point Blank"	December 28, 2015	13.7%	#2	#8	18.5%	#1	#6	
102	"Commitment"	December 29, 2015	13.0%	#2	#8	18.9%	#1	#5	
103	"Burden"	December 30, 2015	13.3%	#2	#9	18.7%	#1	#5	
104	"Wrong Move"	December 31, 2015	11.0%	#2	#9	19.0%	#1	#4	

=== January 2016 ===
#	Episode	Original Air Date	Mega Manila			Nationwide			Ref.
#	Episode	Original Air Date	Rating	Timeslot Rank	Primetime Rank	Rating	Timeslot Rank	Primetime Rank	Ref.
105	"Second Chance"	January 1, 2016	14.2%	#2	#8	17.0%	#1	#5	
106	"Fight"	January 4, 2016	13.1%	#2	#8	18.7%	#1	#5	
107	"Celebration"	January 5, 2016	13.0%	#2	#8	17.4%	#1	#7	
108	"Resolution"	January 6, 2016	13.2%	#2	#9	17.8%	#2	#7	
109	"Hard to Deal"	January 7, 2016	13.5%	#2	#9	18.6%	#1	#6	
110	"Risky"	January 8, 2016	14.2%	#2	#10	19.8%	#1	#6	
111	"Unexpected"	January 11, 2016	15.0%	#2	#8	18.4%	#1	#5	
112	"Acceptance"	January 12, 2016	13.0%	#2	#8	19.1%	#1	#5	
113	"Pain"	January 13, 2016	14.4%	#2	#7	19.7%	#1	#4	
114	"Broken"	January 14, 2016	14.1%	#2	#9	19.8%	#1	#5	
115	"Moment of Truth"	January 15, 2016	13.7%	#2	#8	19.0%	#1	#5	
116	"Cross the Line"	January 18, 2016	12.8%	#2	#9	17.0%	#1	#5	
117	"Clark vs. Simon"	January 19, 2016	13.1%	#2	#8	15.4%	#1	#7	
118	"Inspired"	January 20, 2016	13.8%	#2	#8	16.7%	#1	#6	
119	"Conflict"	January 21, 2016	13.3%	#2	#8	17.6%	#1	#5	
120	"Redemption"	January 22, 2016	14.5%	#2	#8	18.5%	#1	#4	
121	"The Birthday Showdown"	January 25, 2016	14.4%	#2	#8	17.5%	#1	#6	
122	"The Surprise Move"	January 26, 2016	15.1%	#2	#8	18.2%	#1	#6	
123	"Rivalry for a Cause"	January 27, 2016	13.3%	#2	#7	16.9%	#1	#6	
124	"Know Your Limits"	January 28, 2016	15.2%	#2	#8	20.6%	#1	#5	
125	"A Guy Thing"	January 29, 2016	13.2%	#2	#9	17.9%	#1	#5	

=== February 2016 ===
#	Episode	Original Air Date	Mega Manila			Nationwide			Ref.
#	Episode	Original Air Date	Rating	Timeslot Rank	Primetime Rank	Rating	Timeslot Rank	Primetime Rank	Ref.
126	"Too Much"	February 1, 2016	16.2%	#2	#7	19.1%	#1	#5	
127	"On the Rocks"	February 2, 2016	14.9%	#2	#8	19.5%	#1	#5	
128	"Feelings Unleashed"	February 3, 2016	12.6%	#2	#9	17.2%	#1	#6	
129	"Life Changing"	February 4, 2016	15.7%	#2	#9	20.6%	#1	#4	
130	"The Hardest Decision"	February 5, 2016	14.4%	#2	#10	18.3%	#1	#5	
131	"Frustration"	February 8, 2016	13.9%	#2	#9	17.9%	#1	#5	
132	"Disappointment"	February 9, 2016	16.4%	#2	#8	22.1%	#1	#4	
133	"The Breakup"	February 10, 2016	16.1%	#2	#7	20.8%	#1	#4	
134	"Heartbroken"	February 11, 2016	16.9%	#2	#8	22.7%	#1	#4	
135	"Begin Again"	February 12, 2016	15.6%	#2	#9	21.6%	#1	#4	
136	"Separate Lives"	February 15, 2016	16.0%	#2	#8	18.0%	#1	#7	
137	"The Bittersweet Reunion"	February 16, 2016	17.0%	#2	#8	21.9%	#1	#4	
138	"Meet the Client"	February 17, 2016	15.9%	#2	#7	22.4%	#1	#4	
139	"Double Celebration"	February 18, 2016	18.0%	#2	#7	21.2%	#1	#4	
140	"Live for the Moment"	February 19, 2016	16.9%	#2	#7	21.4%	#1	#4	
141	"Last Memorable Trip"	February 22, 2016	16.3%	#2	#7	21.1%	#1	#4	
142	"Love at Last"	February 23, 2016	16.7%	#1	#7	22.2%	#1	#4	
143	"One Last Cry"	February 24, 2016	18.9%	#1	#6	24.6%	#1	#4	
144	"The Last Chance"	February 25, 2016	19.4%	#1	#6	24.4%	#1	#4	
145	"The Last Flight"	February 26, 2016	20.7%	#1	#3	27.8%	#1	#3	

=== TV special ===
Episode	Original Air Date	Mega Manila			Nationwide			Ref.
Episode	Original Air Date	Rating	Timeslot Rank	Afternoon Rank	Rating	Timeslot Rank	Afternoon Rank	Ref.
"On the Wings of Love: Achieved! from Reel to Real"	February 28, 2016	8.7%	#2	#6	9.9%	#2	#7	
