= Cora Waddell =

Filipino actress (born 1989)

- Born: Coraleen Sarah Waddell (Note: Cora Waddell was born in the Northern Mariana Islands. Thus, she does not possess her mother's maiden name which is Roberto.); December 15, 1989 (age 36); Saipan, Northern Mariana Islands
- Other name: Cora
- Occupations: Actress; model; YouTuber
- Years active: 2011–present
- Children: 1

YouTube information
- Channel: Coraleen Waddell
- Genre: vlogging
- Subscribers: 351,000
- Views: 18 million
- Last updated: August 12, 2021

Coraleen "Cora" Sarah Waddell (Tagalog: [ˈkɔɾa ˈwɐdɛl]; born December 15, 1989) is a Filipino actress.

== Early life ==
Coraleen Sarah Waddell was born in Saipan, Northern Mariana Islands, to Scott Waddell and Francy Roberto. Her family migrated to Orlando, Florida when she was eight. Her family's financial problems became worse when Cora's mother was involved in a vehicle accident, had to undergo emergency surgeries and was hospitalized for a month. The subsequent surgeries and long recovery depleted the family's finances and they were unable to pay the huge medical bills. Waddell was forced to quit college and moved to the Philippines to pursue modeling in 2010. Shortly thereafter, she clinched a modelling contract with Elite Manila Management and a five-year contract with Viva Entertainment. She then appeared in two Viva Films-produced movies Diary ng Panget: The Movie and Talk Back and You're Dead. She made guest appearances on several episodes of TV5's remake of Bagets.

On October 29, 2016, Waddell was introduced as a regular housemate of the seventh regular season of Pinoy Big Brother: Lucky 7, and was dubbed “Dazzling Daughter ng Bulacan”. She became the Seventh Big Placer.

In August 2018, Waddell married businessman Terence Lloyd, with whom she has only one child. The couple divorced in 2021. Her child with him was named Leila Celeste Waddell.

== YouTube career ==
Prior to creating her own channel, Waddell first appeared on Wil Dasovich's The Life of a Commercial Model (Metrobank Buddy Cora Waddell) vlog in September 2015. Ten months thereafter, she reunited with Wil and starred in the latter's "Baddest Model in the Philippines" vlog with Daniel Marsh, which went viral (10 million views). The Baddest viral video eventually prompted the creation of #VlogSquad.

On July 29, 2016, Waddell posted her first vlog, aptly titled "Vlogging around the Philippines (my first vlog)".

== Filmography ==
=== Television ===
Year	Title	Role
2019	Tol	Bridgette
2018	Alamat ng Ano	Nila
2018	Bagani	Liwliwa
2018	Ipaglaban Mo: Disgrasyada	Lisa
2017	Wattpad Presents: Just the Strings	Mary Imogen Suarez
2017	Pusong Ligaw	Kayla Benoit
2016–2017	Pinoy Big Brother: Lucky 7	Herself
2011–2012	Bagets: Just Got Lucky	Sachi

=== Film ===
Year	Title	Role
2018	Recipe For Love	Valerie
2017	Woke Up Like This	Kitty
2014	Talk Back and You're Dead	Michie
2014	Diary ng Panget: The Movie	Riri

==== Music video appearance ====
Waddell starred in Jed Madela's Love Takes Time music video together with Tanner Mata. The music video peaked at #5 on Myx's Daily Top Ten. On June 22, 2017, Waddell announced a cameo in Vini Uehara's music video.

== Awards and recognition ==
Year	Award	Result
2017	United Filipino Organization's Batang Pinoy, Batang Saipan	Honoree
2017	YouTube Play Button	Silver Play Button (for surpassing 100,000 subscribers)
2017	Pinoy Big Brother: Lucky 7	7th Big Placer
