= List of Philippine films based on Wattpad stories =

The first Filipino film adapted from a Wattpad story was Viva Films' Diary ng Panget, released in 2014. The story gained significant popularity on the platform, and the film became a box-office success, as reported by Box Office Mojo. The success was followed by Star Cinema's She's Dating the Gangster, which also performed well upon its release.

== Highest-grossing films ==
Highest-grossing films
Rank	Title	Distributor	Domestic gross (in estimated amount)	Ref.
1	She's Dating the Gangster	Star Cinema	₱296,000,000	
2	Diary ng Panget	Viva Films	₱120,000,000	
3	Just the Way You Are	Star Cinema	₱100,000,000	
4	This Time	Viva Films	₱100,000,000	
5	Ex with Benefits	Viva Films, Star Cinema	₱83,340,000	
6	Talk Back and You're Dead	Viva Films	₱76,900,000	

- Ex with Benefits earned an estimated amount of ₱83,340,000 domestically, but due to inflation, the increase of currency exchange rates, and the demand for movie tickets, the film earned an estimated amount of ₱100,670,00 (2018 ₱). The same happened with Talk Back and You're Dead, which earned ₱76,900,000 in the box-office, but in 2018 ₱, the film garnered ₱96,600,000 domestically.

== Films and Television series ==
Release	Title	Notes
April 2, 2014	Diary ng Panget	produced and distributed by Viva Films
July 16, 2014	She's Dating the Gangster	produced and distributed by Star Cinema
August 20, 2014	Talk Back and You're Dead	produced and distributed by Viva Films and Skylight Films
September 20, 2014	Wattpad Presents	produced and distributed for television by TV5
November 17, 2014	Bagito	produced by Dreamscape Entertainment and distributed for television by ABS-CBN
April 29, 2015	Your Place Or Mine?	produced and distributed by Viva Films
June 17, 2015	Just the Way You Are	produced and distributed by Star Cinema
September 2, 2015	Ex with Benefits	produced and distributed by Star Cinema and Viva Films
February 10, 2016	Girlfriend for Hire	produced and distributed by Viva Films
May 4, 2016	This Time	produced and distributed by Viva Films
July 12, 2017	Bloody Crayons	produced and distributed by Star Cinema and Regal Films
May 28, 2021	He's Into Her	produced and distributed for television by Star Cinema and iWantTFC
January 16, 2023	Luv Is	produced and distributed for television by GMA Network
May 1, 2023	The Rain In España	produced and distributed for television by Studio Viva, Viva One, and TV5
Apr 25, 2023	Teen Clash	produced by iWantTFC and Black Sheep
November 20, 2023	Safe Skies, Archer	Produced and distributed for television by Studio Viva, Viva One
August 16, 2024	Chasing in the Wild	Produced and distributed for television by Studio Viva, Viva One
January 3, 2025	Ang Mutya ng Section E	produced and distributed by Viva One
April 11, 2025	Avenues of the Diamond	produced and distributed by Studio Viva, Viva One
June 15, 2025	Seducing Drake Palma	produced and distributed by Viva One
July 31, 2025	The Four Bad Boys and Me	produced and distributed by ABS-CBN Studios and LoneWolf Films
September 5, 2025	I Love You Since 1982	produced and distributed by Viva One
October 18, 2025	Golden Scenery of Tomorrow	produced and distributed by Viva One
February 6, 2026	Hell University	produced by Studio Viva and Webtoon Productions
February 21, 2026	Project Loki	produced by Studio Viva and Webtoon Productions

== Upcoming films ==
Release	Title	Notes
2026	My Husband is a Mafia Boss	produced and distributed by Viva One
