= Wildest Dreams (Nadine Lustre album) =

Studio album by Nadine Lustre
- Released: October 31, 2020
- Genres: Pop; R&B
- Label: Careless Music
- Producers: Marcus Davis; Isagani Palabyab; Bret Jackson; James Reid; Calvin Fernandez; Kahlil Ho Atienza

Nadine Lustre chronology
Nadine Lustre (2014)	Wildest Dreams (2020)

Wildest Dreams is the debut studio album of Filipino singer-actress Nadine Lustre. It is Lustre's first full-length record, released on October 31, 2020, through Careless Music, six years after her self-titled EP Nadine Lustre (2014), which was released through Viva Records.

Professional ratings
Review scores
Source	Rating
NME	3/5 stars

The release of the album was accompanied by a 33-minute visual album featuring a series of music videos for six tracks from the album, directed by Dominic Bekaert.

== Background ==
Ever since Lustre's move to Careless, her sound has evolved from bubblegum pop to pop-soul and urban indie, as heard on singles such as "St4y Up" (2018), "I Like It" (2018), and "No 32" (2019). Although production and conception of the album had started before the COVID-19 pandemic, Lustre admitted that she was able to do a lot of writing for the album during the government-imposed community quarantine. She collaborated for the songwriting with Massiah (Haissam Morton), Bret Jackson (KINGwAw), James Reid, Marcus Davis, and Calvin Fernandez. Production was done by Jackson, Reid, Davis, Fernandez, Isagani Palabyab, and Kahlil Ho Atienza.

Lustre released the title track "Wildest Dreams" as the album's lead single on October 16, 2020.

On October 12, 2020, an announcement that Lustre would be releasing a single entitled "Wildest Dreams" was posted on Careless Music's Instagram page. The single's sound and genre was described as having a "contemporary R&B punch" and as "dance pop with an experimental injection of dark dreamy R&B and a cinematic climax to boot". The song was written by Lustre herself, together with fellow Careless artists, KINGwAw and Massiah. Isagani Palabyab, KINGwAw and James Reid were credited as producers, with mastering done by Marcus Davis.

On October 14, 2020, it was reported by Rappler that aside from the single, Lustre was also set to release a full-length album, which was also called Wildest Dreams.

== Writing and recording ==
On June 2, 2020, Lustre and Reid appeared in a virtual interview together for music channel Myx to talk about their nominations for the 2020 Myx Awards. Reid's song, "Fiend", was nominated for Urban Video of the Year, while Reid and Lustre's duet, "Summer", was nominated for Music Video of the Year. During the interview, the two were able to reveal some information about Lustre's upcoming album, which was still being produced at that time. Lustre revealed that they had been in a one-week lock-in period together with other Careless artists to focus more on the album and their other projects. Lustre also revealed that she was able to do a lot of writing during the government-imposed community quarantine due to the COVID-19 pandemic. She said, "I actually have more time to just be in my head and just think of things that I've always wanted to do. [Things] that I didn't get to do a couple of years back. There's nothing else to do but to just stay creative and write." Regarding the theme of the album, Reid revealed that they wanted it to be empowering. He revealed that this was the direction they chose because of Nadine's life experiences, stating that Lustre is "one of the strongest women" he knew.

== Track listing ==
No.	Title	Writer(s)	Producer(s)	Length
1.	"Dance with Danger"	Nadine Lustre; Bret Jackson; Haissam Morton	Marcus Davis	3:24
2.	"Ivory"	Jackson	Davis; Jackson; James Reid	3:44
3.	"Seconds"	Jackson; Calvin Fernandez; Lustre	Davis	3:53
4.	"Intoxicated"	Jackson; Morton; Reid; Lustre	Isagani Palabyab; Jackson; Reid	3:36
5.	"Complicated Love" (featuring James Reid)	Jackson; Fernandez; Reid; Lustre	Fernandez	4:22
6.	"Save a Place"	Davis	Davis	3:43
7.	"You Can Stay"	Fernandez	Fernandez	2:08
8.	"Glow"	Jackson; Morton; Reid; Lustre	Jackson; Morton; Reid	3:40
9.	"White Rabbit" (featuring Massiah)	Jackson; Morton; Reid; Lustre	Davis	3:20
10.	"Natural"	Jackson; Reid; Lustre	Palabyab; Jackson; Reid	3:41
11.	"Grey Skies"	Jackson; Reid; Lustre	Davis; Jackson; Reid; Palabyab	3:40
12.	"Wildest Dreams"	Lustre; Jackson; Morton	Palabyab; Jackson; Kahlil Ho Atienza	4:09
