= Indak (film) =

2019 film

- Directed by: Paul Alexei Basinillo
- Screenplay by: Kim Noromor; Regene Estolatan; Rhadson Mendoza; Juvy Galamiton
- Story by: Paul Alexei Basinillo
- Produced by: Vic del Rosario Jr.
- Starring: Sam Concepcion; Nadine Lustre
- Cinematography: Odyssey Flores
- Edited by: Ryan Orduña
- Music by: Johann Garcia
- Production company: Viva Films
- Release date: August 7, 2019
- Running time: 117 minutes
- Country: Philippines
- Languages: Filipino; Cebuano

Indak is a Filipino dance musical film directed by Paul Basinillo, starring Sam Concepcion and Nadine Lustre, and produced by Viva Films.

== Cast ==
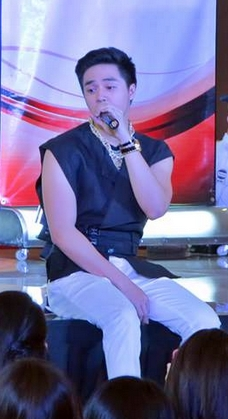
Sam Concepcion portrays Vin.

- Sam Concepcion as Kevin "Vin"
- Nadine Lustre as Janice "Jen"
- Yayo Aguila
- Mayton Eugenio as Abbie
- Julian Trono as Simon
- Karencitta as KC
- Keiko Nakajima as Pat
- Zarah Tolentino as Zeyee
- Rose Van Ginkel as Dany
- Nathalie Alvarez as Reg
- Nicole Omillo as Steph
- Aubrey Caraan as Carmel
- Kedebon Colim as DJ Scratch
- Christian Morones as Karl
- Race Matias as Fred

== Production ==
=== Development ===
In November 2018, Viva Films held a story conference to announce its upcoming film Indak, to be directed by music video and concert director Paul Basinillo. The project is Basinillio's first full-length feature film. The stars of the movie, Lustre and Concepcion, along with Basinillio, told the press that the movie will center around competitive dancing. Lead actress Nadine Lustre was required to learn Cebuano for this film. She described learning the language as a difficult process for her, even making her cry at one point.

=== Promotion ===
Before the film was even announced, Lustre and Concepcion were featured in a campaign ad for ScratchIt, a lottery game that involves scratching a play area on a ticket to reveal a winning symbol or pattern equivalent to a cash prize that is paid to the player immediately. At the story conference for the movie, it was announced that ScratchIt will be one of the movie's sponsors. ScratchIt also held a dance competition online where it called for people to submit videos of themselves doing a dance cover using the choreography and music featured in Lustre and Concepcion's ad. Prizes for the winners include P50,000 and a cameo appearance in the movie.

== Soundtrack ==
Indak (Official Movie Soundtrack) was released by Viva Records on June 21, 2019. It features music from Nadine Lustre, Sam Concepcion, Pio Balbuena, Shehyee, Julian Trono, Janine Tenoso, Thyro Alfaro, Yumi Lacsamana, and Just Hush.

Indak (Official Movie Soundtrack)
No.	Title	Performed by	Length
1.	"Sumayaw sa Indak"	Nadine Lustre, Pio Balbuena, and Shehyee	3:33
2.	"Go For Gold"	John Roa and Karencitta	3:24
3.	"HIndi Tayo Pwede"	Janine Tenoso	4:23
4.	"Let's Get Lost Tonight"	Julian Trono and Pio Balbuena	3:05
5.	"Sabay sa Bayle"	Thyro Alfaro and Yumi Lacsamana	3:23
6.	"Triangulo"	Nadine Lustre, Sam Concepcion, and Nicolo Omillo	4:00
7.	"Take Off"	Just Hush	3:49
8.	"Swerte sa Palad Mo"	Nadine Lustre and Sam Concepcion	2:31
9.	"Ikot-ikot"	Sam Concepcion	3:34
10.	"Sandali"	Because	4:29
Total length:			51 mins.

== Release ==
The film was released on August 7, 2019.

=== Television release ===
The film premiered on pay-per-view channel, KBO from December 20–25, 2019 and on Pinoy Box Office on February 22, 2020.
