= Ulan (film) =

- Theatrical release poster
- Directed by: Irene Emma Villamor
- Written by: Irene Emma Villamor
- Produced by: Vincent del Rosario III; Veronique del Rosario-Corpus; Neil Arce
- Starring: Carlo Aquino; Nadine Lustre; Marco Gumabao; AJ Muhlach
- Cinematography: Neil Daza
- Edited by: Renard Torres
- Music by: Len Calvo
- Production company: Viva Films
- Distributed by: Viva Films
- Release date: March 13, 2019
- Running time: 96 minutes
- Country: Philippines
- Language: Filipino
- Box office: ₱35 million

Ulan (transl. Rain) is a 2019 Filipino romantic drama film written and directed by Irene Villamor, starring Carlo Aquino and Nadine Lustre. The film, which uses elements of magic realism in its storytelling, is a coming-of-age story about a young woman named Maya, who grew up alternately fascinated and fearful of the rain, stalked by storms and the “tikbalang” (the half-horse, half-human creature).

The film was produced by Viva Films in partnership with streaming site HOOQ. It is HOOQ's first original film in the Philippines. It was released in theaters nationwide on March 13, 2019.

== Cast ==
- Carlo Aquino as Peter
- Nadine Lustre as Maya
- Elia Ilano as Young Maya
- Marco Gumabao as Andrew
- AJ Muhlach as Mark
- William Martinez as Billiekoy
- Kylie Verzosa as Princess
- Josef Elizalde as Toph
- Limer Veloso as Norman
- Angeli Bayani as Aning
- Mercedes Cabral (voice) as Tikbalang Bride
- Dingdong Dantes (voice) as Tikbalang Groom

== Production ==
=== Development ===
Villamor spent years writing the screenplay. The idea for the character of Maya originated from a five-minute narrative Villamor made as a film student of the University of the Philippines in 1999. The project is about a girl named Maya whose dream was to climb a tree in their backyard, but her mother would always catch and reprimand her. One day, she finally climbs it and sees a fantastic and she was wishing her mother could also see them. She further developed the idea into a short story which she wrote while working as a script continuity supervisor for director Joyce Bernal in 2004 to 2005, who gave Villamor the idea to turn the short story into a screenplay after the director caught her writing the short story. Bernal serves as the movie's Creative Producer. Villamor cites books by Gabriel Garcia Marquez and Isabel Allende as some of the works that influenced her while writing the story. In the span of more than ten years, Villamor would always return to the screenplay to revise and add ideas as she pleased. Villamor admitted that the concept of the movie was pitched to many different production companies before Viva Films greenlit the project and allowed Villamor to maintain her original vision for the film.

Villamor sent an earlier version of the script to cinematographer Neil Daza in 2011. In 2018, Villamor again sent the script with the working title “Si Maya, ang Ulan at ang mga Tikbalang” to Daza, who found it easy to say yes to doing the project.

=== Casting ===
On June 20, 2018, a story conference was made by Viva Entertainment to announce the new film entitled Ulan which was to star Nadine Lustre and Xian Lim, together with Marco Gumabao and AJ Muhlach. Lim was then removed from the cast and was replaced by Carlo Aquino. The decision to replace Lim was due to scheduling conflict. According to Villamor, getting Aquino, whom she had already worked with in the 2018 romantic movie Meet Me in St. Gallen, to do the role was easy. The two had breakfast together to discuss the movie. Aquino then reminded Villamor that she has already told him about the concept before and agreed to take on the role of Peter.

Villamor describes Lustre, who plays the lead role of Maya, as “a modern Filipina and really has that depth to understand concepts like this. And brave enough to plunge in to a role of Maya." On the first day of filming, Nadine Lustre and Villamor sat down to talk for almost an hour, discussing what the film means for the both of them. She also commends Aquino, whom she describes as “so good in understanding the character and finding connections with the role. He makes my job so much easier because I don’t explain a lot when I talk to him. There’s a click that happens and there he is, right there being Peter.”

Actress Mercedes Cabral and actor Dingdong Dantes served as the voice actors for the tikbalang couple whom the lead character Maya befriends as a child. Villamor has worked with Dantes in the 2018 romantic movie Sid & Aya: Not a Love Story.

=== Filming ===
The biggest challenges of filming, according to Villamor, were creating the rain effect and deciding how the tikbalang would look like. It took three look tests before the team decided on a final look for the tikbalangs. In the end, the inspiration for the final look came from the papier mache works of the artisans they encountered while filming in Pila, Laguna. This gave the look of the tikbalangs crudeness and innocence, which the team felt was appropriate in the story, it was a young Maya that would see the tikbalangs.

Principal photography started on August 6, 2018.

== Soundtrack ==
The original soundtrack was released digitally on March 8, 2019.

Ulan (Original Movie Soundtrack)

Soundtrack album by Various Artists
- Released: March 8, 2019
- Genre: Soundtrack
- Length: 14:26
- Label: Viva Records Corporation

No.	Title	Performed by	Length
1.	"Ulan"	Janine Tenoso	4:21
2.	"Glances"	Sabu	4:39
3.	"Heto Na Naman"	Rice Lucido	5:26

== Release ==
The film was released in cinemas on March 13, 2019.

=== International Screening ===
The film was released on March 21 in the Middle East and on March 22 in Singapore, Canada, USA and Australia. In November 2019, the film was screened at the San Diego Asian Film Festival under the Asia Pop! category at the Edwards Mira Mesa Stadium in San Diego, United States. On February 15, 2020, the film also premiered at the Copenhagen Asian Film Festival 2020.

== Reception ==
=== Critical reception ===
Oggs Cruz of Rappler described Ulan as "more than just fun and fantasies" and "deep and compelling". In relation to director Irene Villamor's filmography— which he described as "intriguing"— he said that the film "occupies a very important position". He went on to further describe the film's voice and perspective as "distinctly feminine" and praised the film for being "unbolted from very rigid plot structures of the genre". He further described it as "often beautifully meandering" and said that it "doesn’t easily surrender to expected emotions, evoking joy and hope out of tragedy". He went on further by calling it "utterly bewitching". He praised the performances of Lustre and Aquino and described them as "splendid". He also praised the film's production design and lighting for giving the film a look that "complements its ambitions". Ultimately, he described the film as a "solid piece of discursive entertainment despite its refreshingly odd mix of strangeness and familiarity.

Click the City's Wanggo Gallaga rated the film 4 out of 5 stars. He gave credit to Villamor for creating "a modern day fairytale that highlights the importance of our capacity for dreams and fantasy". He went on to praise Lustre for giving a "wonderfully measured performance that allows her to shift along with the film’s transitions to its many different genres".

Tito Genova Valiente of BusinessMirror described Ulan as a "lovely, singular film about loving and not loving" and went on to praise the performances of Lustre and Aquino. He praised Aquino for giving a "nuanced" performance and described the actor as a "wondrous face from one scene to another". As for Lustre's performance, he remarked that the actress has "proven to be the best actress in her generation in this role of a person whose life seems to be ruled not by the stars but by the rains". He went on to further describe Lustre's performance by saying that, "It has been such a long time when the camera of a local film has ever been in love with an actress. Nadine Lustre, with the face that can act, deserves that love." He also praised the film's cinematography and editing for contributing "keenly" to the film's narrative, and called director Irene Villamor "daring".

=== Accolades ===
Award	Date of ceremony	Category	Recipient	Result
Asian Academy Creative Awards	October 16, 2019 (Regional)	Best Feature Film	Ulan	Won
Asian Academy Creative Awards	October 16, 2019 (Regional)	Best Original Screenplay	Irene Villamor	Won
Asian Academy Creative Awards	October 16, 2019 (Regional)	Best Cinematography	Neil Daza	Won
Asian Academy Creative Awards	October 16, 2019 (Regional)	Best Sound	Ulan	Won
Asian Academy Creative Awards	October 16, 2019 (Regional)	Best Direction (Fiction)	Irene Villamor	Won
Asian Academy Creative Awards	October 16, 2019 (Regional)	Best Actor in a Leading Role	Carlo Aquino	Won
Asian Academy Creative Awards	October 16, 2019 (Regional)	Best Actress in a Leading Role	Nadine Lustre	Won
Asian Academy Creative Awards	December 6, 2019 (Grand Finals)	Best Sound	Ulan	Won
LionheartTV Rawr Awards	November 15, 2019	Bibo of the Year (Best Child Actress)	Elia Ilano	Won
PMPC Star Awards for Movies	December, 2019	Best Child Performer	Elia Ilano	Nominated
43rd Gawad Urian	November 10, 2020	Best Actress	Nadine Lustre	Nominated
43rd Gawad Urian	November 10, 2020	Best Supporting Actor	Perla Bautista	Nominated
43rd Gawad Urian	November 10, 2020	Best Cinematography	Neil Daza	Nominated
43rd Gawad Urian	November 10, 2020	Best Editing	Bernard Torres	Nominated
43rd Gawad Urian	November 10, 2020	Best Production Design	Ferdie Abuel	Nominated
43rd Gawad Urian	November 10, 2020	Best Music	Len Calvo and Adriane Macalipay	Nominated
43rd Gawad Urian	November 10, 2020	Best Sound	Vince Jan Banta, Mikko Quizon and RJ Cantos	Nominated
68th FAMAS Awards	December 20, 2020	Best Production Design	Ferdie Abuel	Nominated
68th FAMAS Awards	December 20, 2020	Best Cinematography	Neil Daza	Nominated
68th FAMAS Awards	December 20, 2020	Best Sound	Jason Conanan and Mikko Quizon	Nominated
68th FAMAS Awards	December 20, 2020	Best Performance of the Year (Actress)	Nadine Lustre	Nominated
