= On the Wings of Love (TV series) =

2015–16 Philippine television drama series

- Title card
- Genre: Romance; Comedy; Drama
- Created by: Dindo C. Perez; Reggie Amigo; Rondel P. Lindayag
- Written by: Benedict Mique; Mariami Tanangco-Domingo; Nathaniel Arciaga; Allan Cuadra
- Directed by: Antoinette H. Jadaone; Jojo A. Saguin; Dan Villegas; Darnel Joy R. Villaflor; Francis Xavier E. Pasion
- Starring: James Reid; Nadine Lustre
- Opening theme: "On the Wings of Love" by Kyla
- Composers: Peter Schless; Jeffrey Osborne
- Country of origin: Philippines
- Original language: Filipino
- No. of episodes: 145 (list of episodes)

Production
- Executive producers: Carlo Katigbak; Cory Vidanes; Laurenti Dyogi; Roldeo T. Endrinal
- Producers: Arnel T. Nacario; Emerald C. Suarez; Julie Anne R. Benitez
- Production locations: Manila, Philippines; San Francisco, United States; Napa Valley, United States; Talisay, Batangas, Philippines; Ilocos, Philippines; Lake Tahoe, United States; Antipolo, Philippines
- Cinematography: Hermann Claravall; Rodrigo Tinitigan
- Editors: Rommel Malimban; Bernie Diasanta
- Running time: 30–42 minutes
- Production company: Dreamscape Entertainment Television

Original release
- Network: ABS-CBN
- Release: August 10, 2015 – February 26, 2016

Related
- Till I Met You

On the Wings of Love is a Philippine television drama series broadcast by ABS-CBN. Directed by Antoinette H. Jadaone, Jojo A. Saguin, Dan Villegas, Darnel Joy R. Villaflor and Francis Xavier E. Pasion, it stars James Reid and Nadine Lustre. It aired on the network's Primetime Bida line up and worldwide on TFC from August 10, 2015, to February 26, 2016, replacing Bridges of Love and was replaced by The Story of Us.

The romantic comedy centers around two people — Clark, a boy living his American life, and Leah, a simple girl with an American dream, who are forced to marry in order to legally stay and continue working in the United States.

The show ended on February 26, 2016, and this episode was divided into two parts: a recorded segment and followed by a live viewing party in Ynares Center, Antipolo. It was also simulcasted live on ABS-CBN and worldwide on TFC.

== Plot ==
Leah Olivar (Nadine Lustre) grew up in a very poor, but happy family. When she was 12 years old, her mother, Rona (Isay Alvarez), went to the United States to work towards a better future for their family. Life eventually becomes better for Leah, her sister, Tiffany (Bianca Manalo), and their father, Sol (Joel Torre). However, a tragedy changes their lives forever. For Leah, Rona's death creates a desire for her to go to America and fulfill her mother's "American dream".

Ten years later, this dream comes true as Leah gets her visa to compete in a choir competition in San Francisco, California. After the contest, Leah extends her stay in San Francisco with the intention of visiting her mother's grave, and finding a way to legally work in the United States. However, to Leah's surprise, her mother's grave was nowhere to be found, and as her visa expires, finding a job that would allow her to remain in the United States also becomes elusive.

With the urging of Jack (Cherry Pie Picache), the mother of Leah's ex-boyfriend, Jigs (Albie Casiño), and out of desperation, Leah agrees to a marriage of convenience so that she could get her visa. But with Leah's limited resources, it will be hard for Jack to find her a partner. The only suitable person that would agree to the small amount that Leah is willing to pay is Jack's nephew, Clark (James Reid), who has been living in San Francisco for the past 11 years. His life has been full of heartbreaks since he went to the United States with his mother, Ofelia (Katya Santos), to be introduced to his American father, Kenneth. Soon after, Kenneth refuses to recognize Clark as his son, and Ofelia then suddenly dies. Clark gets placed in foster homes, where he is regularly abused. Later, because of his love for his siblings in the Philippines, Clark persevered and managed to survive life in the U.S. These misfortunes and responsibilities in life deprived Clark of romantic love.

Despite their disastrous first meeting, Leah and Clark spend time as a fake couple and learn about each other's past, quirks and habits, in order to pass the Immigration and Naturalization Service (INS) interview. As time passes, Leah and Clark discover a certain fondness for each other. They also realize that they both have the same goal in life and that is to make a better life for their families.

They also start to sympathize with each other, as both reveal their deepest secrets. Soon, the sham marriage between Leah and Clark becomes real.

== Cast and characters ==
=== Main cast ===
- James Reid as Clark Medina
- Nadine Lustre as Leah Olivar-Medina
- Cherry Pie Picache as Jacqueline "Jack" Fausto
- Joel Torre as Soliman "Sol" Olivar
- Nanette Inventor as Pacita "Lola Pachang / Ima" Magtoto-Fausto
- Isay Alvarez as Veronica "Rona" Martinez-Olivar / Wyatt

=== Very Special Role ===
- Paulo Avelino as Simon Evangelista

=== Supporting cast ===
- Albie Casiño as Diego "Jigs" Fausto
- Bianca Manalo as Tiffany Olivar-Carpio
- Nico Antonio as Antonio "Tolayts" Carpio
- Thou Reyes as Denzel
- Jason Francisco as Cullen
- Paolo O'Hara as Abet Fausto
- Jordan Castillo as Romer Fausto
- Ruby Ruiz as Lolit Carpio
- Joel Saracho as Mama Lulu
- Geraldine Villamil as Kapitana
- Juan Miguel Severo as Rico
- Cheska Iñigo as Diana Stevens
- Kyle Echarri as Brent Wyatt
- Ysabel Ortega as Angela Stevens-Fausto
- Andre Garcia as Jordan Medina
- Laiza Comia as Jennifer "Jenny" Medina
- Nhikzy Calma as Gabriel "Gabby" Olivar Carpio / Gabriel "Gabby" Velasco
- Benj Manalo as Axel
- Rafael "Paeng" Sudayan as Kiko
- Jhustin Agustin as Rodolfo
- Vivien Benjamin

=== Introducing ===
- Bailey May as Harry Fausto
- Ylona Garcia as Audrey Olivar
- Ynna Asistio as Maggie Regalado

=== Guest cast ===
- Matt Evans as Adrian Velasco
- Lee O'Brian as Arthur Wyatt
- Miguel Faustmann as Kenneth
- Anna Luna as Juliet Perez
- Heaven Peralejo as Heaven
- Japo Parcero as Monette
- Paul Cabral as Wedding Gown Designer
- Mark McMahon as Ethan
- James Vincent Martinez as Andres Suntay
- Anne Curtis as Herself
- Jobelle Salvador as Flora Evangelista

=== Special participation ===
- Katya Santos as Ofelia Fausto-Medina
- Josh Ford as Young Clark Medina
- Avery Balasbas as Young Leah Olivar
- Trajan Moreno as Young Diego "Jigs" Fausto
- Belle Mariano as Young Tiffany Olivar

== Production ==
=== Casting ===
On the Wings of Love was the brainchild of Coco Martin based on his experiences as an OFW in Canada. The concept was originally supposed to be a movie starring Martin and superstar Nora Aunor but she turned down the role of Martin's mother as she was busy doing other projects. The film with Martin and Aunor would eventually be released in 2016 under the title Padre de Familia, starring Martin and Aunor. This concept would again be revisited by Martin in his 2022 Metro Manila Film Festival entry, Labyu with an Accent.

With the film's release then uncertain, the concept was turned into a teleserye which necessitated a change in the female lead to co-star with Martin. Judy Ann Santos was approached to be Martin's leading lady. Santos, however, turned down the offer due to unexpected pregnancy. Sarah Geronimo was also approached for the role of leading lady but also had to turn down the offer due to scheduling conflicts. Martin also ended up being busy with his teleserye, Ang Probinsyano.

Finally, the roles were given to James Reid and Nadine Lustre which marks their first lead roles in a teleserye as they signed exclusive contracts with ABS-CBN.

Originally, the role of Jiggs was to be played by Arjo Atayde. Atayde's casting has gone as far as the look test when he was pulled out of the show to play Joaquin Tuazon, the main antagonist of Ang Probinsyano. Albie Casiño would eventually bag the role of Jiggs.

=== Soundtrack ===
In March 2015, R&B singer Kyla recorded two cover versions of the series' eponymous theme song originally sung by Jeffrey Osborne and later covered by Regine Velasquez. The original version and its music video was released on May 16, 2015, via YouTube, while the alternate version is a piano cover.

The theme song's original version is also part of the volume one of Dreamscape Televisions of Love album and Kyla's 15th anniversary compilation album My Very Best.

Artists	Song
Kyla	"On the Wings of Love"
James Reid and Nadine Lustre	"On the Wings of Love"
James Reid and Nadine Lustre	"Hanap-Hanap"
Erik Santos	"Say You'll Never Go"
Daryl Ong	"Stay"
James Reid	"Randomantic"
James Reid	"Bonfire Love Song"
James Reid	"Babalik"
Jed Madela	"If You Don't Want To Fall"

== Reception ==
=== Ratings ===
KANTAR MEDIA NATIONAL TV RATINGS (9:15PM PST)
PILOT EPISODE	FINALE EPISODE	PEAK	AVERAGE	SOURCE
22.1%	27.8%	27.8%	24.95%	

=== Awards and nominations ===
Year	Association	Award	Category	Nominee	Result	Source
2015	Star Cinema	2015 StarCinema.com.ph Awards	Favorite TV Show	On the Wings of Love	Won	
2015	Global City Innovative College	1st GIC Innovation Awards for Television	Most Innovative TV Series	On the Wings of Love	Won	
2016	Guillermo Mendoza Memorial Scholarship Foundation	47th Box Office Entertainment Awards	Prince of Philippine Television	James Reid	Won	
2016	Guillermo Mendoza Memorial Scholarship Foundation	47th Box Office Entertainment Awards	Princess of Philippine Television	Nadine Lustre	Won	
2016	Anak TV	18th Anak TV Seal Awards	Household Favorite TV Program	On the Wings of Love	Won	
2016	Myx	11th MYX Music Awards	Favorite Media Soundtrack	Kyla for "On the Wings of Love"	Won	
2016	Myx	11th MYX Music Awards	Favorite Remake	Kyla for "On the Wings of Love"	Won	
2016	University of Santo Tomas	12th USTV Students’ Choice Awards	Students' Choice of Drama Program	On the Wings of Love	Won	
2016	Kapisanan ng mga Brodkaster ng Pilipinas	24th Golden Dove Awards	Best TV Drama Program	On the Wings of Love	Won	
2016	Philippine Entertainment Portal	The PEP List Year 3 Awards	Primetime Series of the Year	On the Wings of Love	Won	
2016	Philippine Entertainment Portal	The PEP List Year 3 Awards	Teleserye Supporting Actress of the Year	Cherry Pie Picache	Won	
2016	Philippine Movie Press Club	8th PMPC Star Awards for Music	Pop Album of the Year	James Reid and Nadine Lustre for Jadine: On the Wings of Love	Nominated	
2016	Philippine Movie Press Club	8th PMPC Star Awards for Music	Male Pop Artist of the Year	James Reid for Jadine: On the Wings of Love	Nominated	
2016	Philippine Movie Press Club	8th PMPC Star Awards for Music	Female Pop Artist of the Year	Nadine Lustre for Jadine: On the Wings of Love	Nominated	
2016	Philippine Movie Press Club	30th PMPC Star Awards for Television	Best Primetime Drama Series	On the Wings of Love	Nominated	
2016	Philippine Movie Press Club	30th PMPC Star Awards for Television	Best Drama Actor	James Reid	Nominated	
2016	Philippine Movie Press Club	30th PMPC Star Awards for Television	Best Drama Actress	Nadine Lustre	Nominated	
2016	Philippine Movie Press Club	30th PMPC Star Awards for Television	Best New Male TV Personality	Bailey May	Nominated	
2016	Philippine Movie Press Club	30th PMPC Star Awards for Television	Best New Female TV Personality	Ylona Garcia	Nominated	

=== Controversies ===
==== "Dancing Police" Scene ====
In an episode, Clark (character of James Reid) pretends to arrest, handcuff and blindfold his wife Leah (character of Nadine Lustre). Leah was shocked that her husband Clark was dancing while wearing a police uniform. Later on, a scene was made to show how they were sorry for making the police feel offended about the scene.

== Reruns ==
Reruns of the show's episodes began airing on Jeepney TV from June 26 to September 1, 2017, and was replaced by reruns of Dolce Amore.

On March 13, 2020, it was announced that On the Wings of Love would be rerun from March 16, 2020, temporarily replacing Make It with You as part of the programming changes on ABS-CBN due to the community quarantine caused by the COVID-19 pandemic.

This rerun was abruptly cut due to the temporary closure of ABS-CBN following the cease and desist order issued by the National Telecommunications Commission on account of its franchise expiration and was replaced by The World of the Married Couple on Kapamilya Channel's timeslot on June 15, 2020. It was aired on Jeepney TV instead for the reruns from June 1 to September 11, 2020, and was replaced by reruns of Langit Lupa.

All full episodes of On the Wings of Love are currently uploaded on ABS-CBN Entertainment YouTube Channel every Monday to Friday at 8:00 p.m.

Reruns of the show's episodes began airing on PIE Channel (BEAM TV subchannel) on August 22, 2022 to March 10, 2023, and was replaced by Got to Believe, from 12:00 p.m. to 12:45 p.m. from Mondays to Fridays, and from 12:00 p.m. to 3:00 p.m. on Saturdays.

The show began airing reruns on All TV and Jeepney TV from May 13 to November 29, 2024, and was replaced by reruns of The General's Daughter.

== International broadcast ==
- Kenya – NTV (December 18, 2017 - April 7, 2018)
- Indonesia – MNCTV (November 21, 2016 - January 22, 2017)
- Thailand – Channel 3 (March 6, 2017 - June 20, 2017)

== See also ==
- List of ABS-CBN Studios original drama series
- List of programs broadcast by Jeepney TV
