= This Time (film) =

- Directed by: Nuel Crisostomo Naval
- Written by: Mel Mendoza-del Rosario
- Based on: That One Summer by Alyloony
- Produced by: Vic del Rosario Jr.
- Starring: James Reid; Nadine Lustre
- Cinematography: Anne Monzon
- Edited by: Marya Ignacio
- Music by: Jesse Lucas
- Production company: Viva Films
- Distributed by: Viva Films
- Release date: May 4, 2016
- Running time: 109 minutes
- Country: Philippines
- Language: Filipino
- Box office: ₱120 million

This Time is a 2016 Filipino romantic drama film directed by Nuel Crisostomo Naval, starring James Reid and Nadine Lustre. The film was loosely based on the Wattpad novel That One Summer by Aly Almario. It was released on May 4, 2016 by Viva Films. and made ₱15 million pesos on its first opening day of showing.

== Synopsis ==
Coby Martinez (James Reid) and Ava Buhay (Nadine Lustre) are childhood friends who only see each other every summer. Their friendship blossomed into a romance; however, they have yet to put a label on it. When Ava enters college she struggled with continuing her unclear relationship with Coby. She has met a new friend in Aldrin which made Coby reflect on the value of Ava in his life and their relationship.

== Cast ==
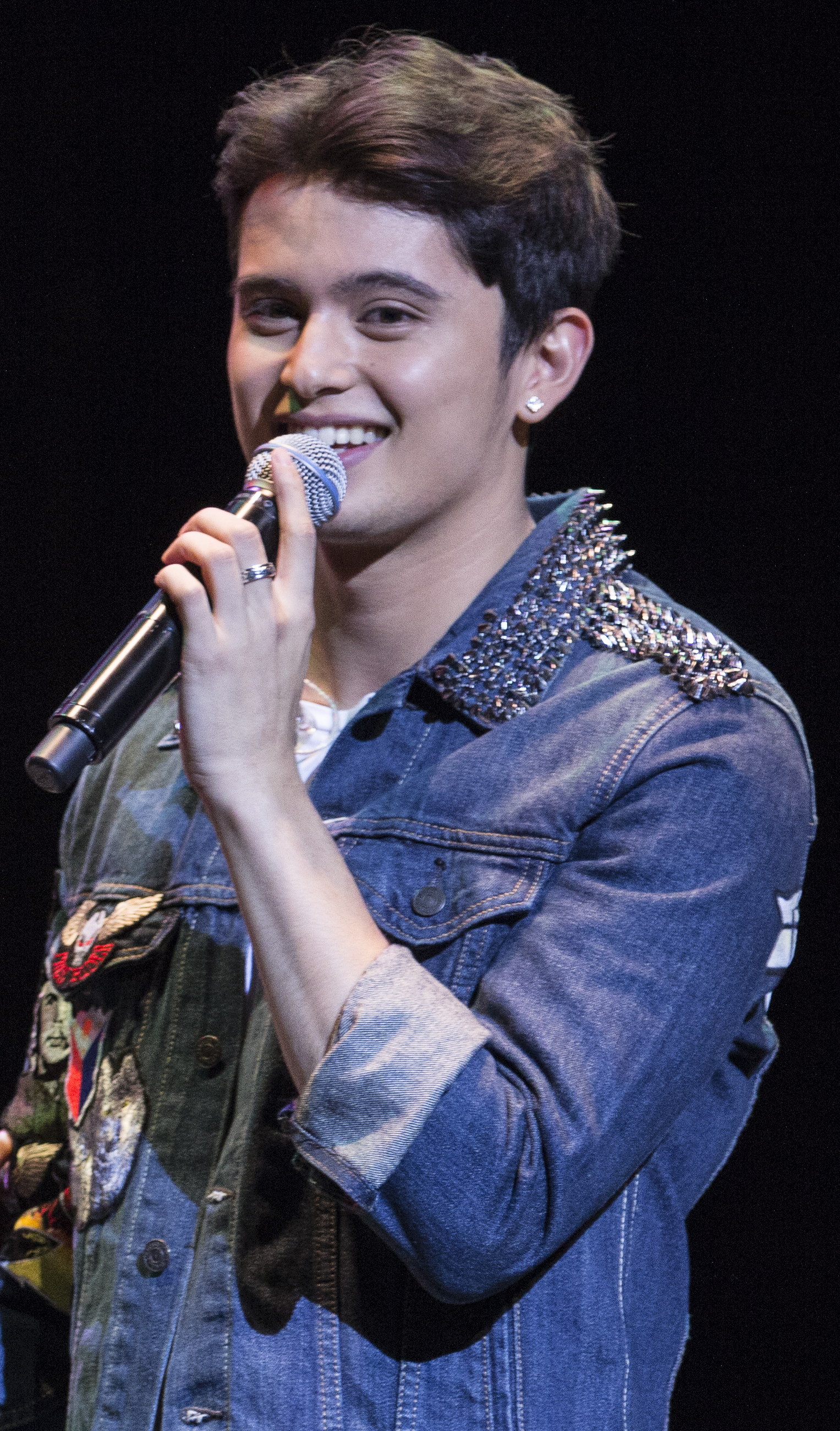
James Reid portrays Coby Martinez.

- James Reid as Coby Martinez
  - Josh Ford as second generation Coby Martinez
  - Noel Comia, Jr. as first generation Coby Martinez
- Nadine Lustre as Ava Buhay
  - Junyka Santarin as second generation Ava Buhay
  - Karla Cruz as first generation Ava Buhay
- Bret Jackson as Aldrin Domingo
- Donnalyn Bartolome as Mimi
- Issa Pressman as Ren/Ren-Ren
- Yam Concepcion as Annie Buhay
- Candy Pangilinan as Analyn Buhay
- Al Tantay as Aldo Buhay
- Freddie Webb as Melchor Martinez
- Nova Villa as Ofelia Salazar
- Ronnie Lazaro as Ate Bi
- Tess Antonio as Coby's nanny
- Michael De Mesa as Gino
- Lloyd Samartino as Aldrin's father
- Pinky Amador as Aldrin's mother
- Carla Humphries as Aldrin's sister

Additional characters were also cast–including Lance Lucido as Emmanuel Buhay and Jelson Bay as the Cornetto Ice Cream Cart driver. Jerry O'Hara, Peewee O'Hara, Karla Pambid, and Rein Gutierrez as Coby's best friend were cast with an uncredited role.

== Reception ==
=== Box office ===
This Time garnered PHP 15 million on its opening day. The film's production company never released publicly its official final gross, but a website called Spikedaily, posted in their article that the film's gross is estimated PHP 100 million.

=== Critical response ===
This Time received lukewarm reviews from critics. Oggs Cruz of Rappler called the film "entertaining but lacking". He gave credit to screenwriter Mel Mendoza del Rosario by saying that "the film has some really comforting charms, owing largely to Mel Mendoza-del Rosario's ability to craft a screenplay that unabashedly adheres to a romantic formula that clearly works." He also commented on Naval's direction, saying that the director "realizes the story with a quaint understanding of both the mechanics of romance and the expectations of his market, resulting in a film that can be best described as a triumph of perfected mediocrity and levelled expectations."

Philbery Dy of Click The City, criticized the film for its "fuzzy narrative structure" which cause the movie to "lose emotional cohesion". He further said, "The treatment as a whole is kind of a mess, the direction pulling the movie in several different directions. It is best as a low-key romantic drama, focusing on the small moments of connection between the leads. As a comedy, it feels unsure of its approach. It throws a lot in there: loud parents, sassy friends, overwrought laugh lines, and at certain points, animated overlays that mimic the effect of Snapchat filters. It all feels terribly messy, and it takes away from the main attraction." However, he praised the chemistry of the lead stars, saying that "James Reid and Nadine Lustre look more and more comfortable on screen together, and their familiarity with each other offers a shade of realism that cuts through the awful artificiality of the rest of the film."

== See also ==
- List of Philippine films based on Wattpad stories
