= Never Not Love You =

- Theatrical film poster
- Directed by: Antoinette Jadaone
- Written by: Antoinette Jadaone
- Produced by: Vic R. del Rosario Jr.
- Starring: James Reid; Nadine Lustre
- Cinematography: Mycko David; Carlos Mauricio
- Edited by: Benjamin S. Tolentino
- Music by: Arlene Flerida Calvo
- Production companies: Viva Films; Project 8 Projects
- Distributed by: Viva Films
- Release date: March 31, 2018
- Running time: 100-105 minutes
- Country: Philippines
- Languages: Filipino; English
- Box office: ₱92 million

Never Not Love You is a 2018 Filipino romantic drama film written and directed by Antoinette Jadaone. Starring James Reid and Nadine Lustre, the story follows Gio and Joanne, whose young, carefree, and reckless love is tested when their dreams take them in different directions.

Produced and distributed by Viva Films, in collaboration with Project 8 Projects, the film was released in theaters nationwide on March 31, 2018.

== Synopsis ==
The story follows Gio and Joanne, who meet at a tattoo parlor where Gio offers Joanne a ride on his scooter back to her office, which sparks an instant connection between them. Gio is a freelance graphic designer, while Joanne is an aspiring assistant brand manager and the breadwinner of her family. The young couple is trying to build a life together when career opportunities bring them to London, which tests their relationship.

== Cast ==
- James Reid as Gio Smith
- Nadine Lustre as Joanne Candelaria
- Gab Lagman as Gab
- Luis Alandy as Jason
- Yayo Aguila as Joanne's mother
- Sharmaine Suarez as Ms. Bing
- Alexis Navarro as Joanne's office best friend
- Jamie Scott Gordon as David
- Rez Cortez as Joanne's father
- Vitto Marquez as Joanne's brother
- Josef Elizalde as Joanne's co-worker
- Abby Bautista as Joanne's younger sister

== Production ==
=== Development ===
The film's initial title was Five Years Later, then changed to Here's to the Fools. On December 22, 2017, the director announced the final title of the film to be Never Not Love You.

=== Filming ===
The film's shooting locations are Makati CBD, Quezon City Zambales, and London.

== Soundtrack ==
Never Not Love You (Original Movie Soundtrack)

Soundtrack album / EP by Various Artists
- Released: March 27, 2018
- Genre: Soundtrack
- Length: 22:43
- Language: Tagalog
- Label: Viva Records Corporation

Singles from Never Not Love You (Original Movie Soundtrack)
- 1. "Prom" Released: 23 March 2018

The soundtrack of the film includes music and performances by John Roa, Janine Teñoso, Marion Aunor, Ebe Dancel, and James Reid and Nadine Lustre. The first song released with an official music video is "Prom", performed by Reid and Lustre. It also serves as the lead single for the soundtrack of the film. Roa's "Oks Lang" was featured in the 2nd teaser for the film.

Never Not Love You (Original Movie Soundtrack)
No.	Title	Performed by	Length
1.	"Prom"	James Reid and Nadine Lustre	4:28
2.	"Oks Lang"	John Roa	5:36
3.	"Bulong"	Janine Teñoso	3:45
4.	"Sana"	Marion Aunor	4:28
5.	"Prom (Acoustic)"	Ebe Dancel	4:26
Total length:			22:43

Notes

- "Bulong" is a cover of "Bulong" by Kitchie Nadal.
- "Prom" is a cover of "Prom" by Sugarfree.
- "Sana" is a cover of "Sana" by Up Dharma Down.
- Ebe Dancel of the band Sugarfree made an acoustic version of "Prom" for the film.

== Release ==
The film was theatrically released on 2018 March 31.

=== International screening ===
The film made an international screening in selected theaters in the United States and the Middle East. In November 2018, it was screened at the International Film Festival of India held in the city of Goa as part of the World Panorama section.

== Reception ==
=== Box office ===
Never Not Love You grossed ₱20 million on its second day of showing in over 200 theaters according to the Instagram post of Viva Artists Agency. As of April 15, 2018, the film had grossed an estimated ₱92 million.

=== Critical response ===
Never Not Love You received mostly positive reviews from critics with particular praise going to the performances of Lustre and Reid and the directorial efforts of Jadaone. In a review for Rappler.com, Oggs Cruz said that "the film is so meticulously threadbare, it feels like its central love story belongs not in the realms of commercial entertainment but in the real world". He called the film Jadaone's "most grounded romance" and praised the director's ability "for turning the nondescript to magic..."

Wanggo Gallaga of the website Click the City gave the film 5 out of 5 stars and described Reid as "charming as hell" and called Lustre a "powerhouse" and the "real star" of the film while praising her performance by saying that "There is a whole world of emotions within her that she carries with every movement".

Inquirer's Cake Evangelista called the film as the lead stars' "best work so far". Reid was commended for finding a "balance" in his character and Lustre for being someone who "evokes a wealth of meaning and emotion". Director Jadaone was called the film's "true strength". Evangelista noted that "In Never Not love You, Jadaone shows us a different side of herself as a storyteller."

The Neighborhood's Philbert Dy gave the film a rating of 4 out of 5 and praised how it "smartly examines modern romance in oddly pragmatic terms". He praised Reid for leaning into his character and described Lustre as the one who "shines in the movie". Regarding Lustre's performance as Joanne, he said that the actress "just makes everything feel meaningful". He also noted that the pair displays "a familiarity and chemistry that might just be unmatched."

== Accolades ==
Award	Date of ceremony	Category	Recipient(s)	Result	Ref.
Guild of Educators, Mentors, and Students Hiyas Ng Sining Awards	March 21, 2019	Best Film (Mainstream)	Never Not Love You	Won	
Guild of Educators, Mentors, and Students Hiyas Ng Sining Awards	March 21, 2019	Best Film Director (Mainstream)	Antoinette Jadaone	Won	
Guild of Educators, Mentors, and Students Hiyas Ng Sining Awards	March 21, 2019	Best Actor	James Reid	Nominated	
Guild of Educators, Mentors, and Students Hiyas Ng Sining Awards	March 21, 2019	Best Actress	Nadine Lustre	Nominated	
Inside Showbiz Awards	March 3, 2019	Favorite Movie Actor	James Reid	Won	
Inside Showbiz Awards	March 3, 2019	Favorite Movie Actress	Nadine Lustre	Won	
Inside Showbiz Awards	March 3, 2019	Favorite Movie	Never Not Love You	Won	
Inside Showbiz Awards	March 3, 2019	Favorite Movie Director	Antoinette Jadaone	Won	
Inside Showbiz Awards	March 3, 2019	Favorite Movie Soundtrack	Prom by Ebe Dancel	Won	
Myx Music Awards	May 15, 2019	Media Soundtrack of the Year	Prom by James Reid and Nadine Lustre	Won	
Young Critics Circle	August 16, 2019	Best Performance	Nadine Lustre	Won	
Young Critics Circle	August 16, 2019	Best Editing	Benjamin Tolentino	Nominated	
Young Critics Circle	August 16, 2019	Best Cinematography and Visual Design	Cinematography: Mycko David and Carlo Mauricio; Production design: Ana Lou Sanchez	Nominated	
Young Critics Circle	August 16, 2019	Best Sound and Aural Orchestration	Music: Len Calvo; Sound Design: Jason Conanan, Kat Salinas and Mikko Quizon	Won	
FAMAS Awards	April 28, 2019	Outstanding Performance by an Actor in a Leading Role	James Reid	Nominated	
FAMAS Awards	April 28, 2019	Outstanding Performance by an Actress in a Leading Role	Nadine Lustre	Won	
FAMAS Awards	April 28, 2019	Outstanding Achievement in Cinematography	Mycko David	Nominated	
FAMAS Awards	April 28, 2019	Best Picture	Never Not Love You	Nominated	
42nd Gawad Urian	June 18, 2019	Best Actress	Nadine Lustre	Won	
35th PMPC Star Awards for Movies	June 2, 2019	Movie Actress of the Year	Nadine Lustre	Nominated	
35th PMPC Star Awards for Movies	June 2, 2019	Movie Actor of the Year	James Reid	Nominated	
35th PMPC Star Awards for Movies	June 2, 2019	Movie Loveteam of the Year	James Reid and Nadine Lustre	Nominated	
3rd Eddys Award	July 4, 2019	Best Actress	Nadine Lustre	Nominated	
3rd Eddys Award	July 4, 2019	Best Cinematography	Mycko David	Nominated	
