= Diary ng Panget (film) =

- Theatrical release poster
- Directed by: Andoy Ranay
- Screenplay by: Mel Mendoza-del Rosario
- Story by: Denny R.
- Based on: Diary ng Panget by Denny R.
- Produced by: Vic del Rosario Jr.
- Starring: Nadine Lustre; James Reid; Yassi Pressman; Andre Paras
- Cinematography: Pao Orendain
- Edited by: Tara Illenberger
- Music by: Teresa Barrozo
- Production company: Viva Films
- Distributed by: Viva Films
- Release date: April 2, 2014
- Running time: 114 minutes
- Country: Philippines
- Languages: English; Filipino
- Box office: ₱120 million

Diary ng Panget (lit. 'Diary of an Ugly Person') (also known as Diary ng Panget: The Movie) is a 2014 Filipino romantic comedy film based on the best-selling novel of the same name written and published on Wattpad by Denny R. The film was directed by Andoy Ranay and stars Nadine Lustre, James Reid, Yassi Pressman, and Andre Paras. It was distributed by Viva Films and released on April 2, 2014, in theaters nationwide.

Though well-received by fans, it was heavily panned by most critics, claiming that the story and the cast had a lack of formula and effort, and called the story a cliché. Despite the poor critical reception, the film was a box office success, earning an estimated total of ₱120 million during its theatrical run.

== Plot ==
Eya is a kind-hearted girl who has faced several difficulties in life. Orphaned at the age of 14, her aunt adopts her but kicks her out as soon as she turns 18. Unable to make ends meet, she gets a new job as a personal maid only to realize she has to look after Cross, an egoistic young man who she calls the "monster". Cross, having lost his mother at a young age, has grown resentful towards everybody around him. But regardless of their differences, they start developing feelings for each other. Eya does not realize this and starts developing a crush on her best friend Chad, but later lets go of him since he likes her friend Lory. However, Lory has had a crush on Cross since when they were in kindergarten and feels betrayed when Eya starts spending more time with Cross. Chad comforts Lory and expresses his love, which makes her think about exploring other options. Lory makes up with Eya and they decide to go to the school masquerade ball together. Eya gets to dance with a handsome young man who she thinks is her "prince charming", but she fails to recognize him with his mask on. The next day, Eya and her friends help her in finding her prince by measuring the height, voice, and foot size of all the guys in school but fails miserably.

At the end of the day, Eya gets a call from a man telling her to meet him since he has something to discuss with her. When she meets this man, he claims to be her "prince charming". Cross interrupts them claiming that the man is lying, and the man explains that he was sent by someone in order to provoke the real "prince charming". When Eya confronts Cross about this he comes clean about being her "prince", he also confesses that he likes her, and also explains that she couldn't recognize his voice since he had a cold the day of the ball. Eya then accepts the fact that she likes him too, and agrees to be his girlfriend.

== Cast ==
- Nadine Lustre as Reah "Eya" Rodriguez
- James Reid as Cross Sandford
- Yassi Pressman as Lorraine "Lory" Keet
- Andre Paras as Chad Jimenez
- Gabby Concepcion as Mr. Sandford
- Mitch Valdez as Auntie
- Candy Pangilinan as Mayordoma
- AJ Muhlach as Ian Del Rosario
- Arkin Del Rosario as Seven
- Coraleen Waddell as Michie
- Janna Roque as Femme
- Carissa Quintas as Steph

== Production ==
=== Music ===
Due to the success of the movie, the soundtrack for the film was released March 26, 2014, by Viva Records with a co-production of Flipmusic records. The physical copy of soundtrack is available in leading music stores and digitally via iTunes.

Diary ng Panget (Original Movie Soundtrack)

Soundtrack album by Various artists
- Released: March 26, 2014
- Recorded: 2014
- Genre: Pop
- Length: 34:59
- Label: Viva Records

No.	Title	Artist	Length
1.	"No Erase"	James Reid and Nadine Lustre	3:39
2.	"Rocketeer"	James Reid and Nadine Lustre	4:09
3.	"Paligoy-ligoy"	Nadine Lustre	3:18
4.	"Natataranta"	James Reid	3:09
5.	"Di Ko Alam"	Yassi Pressman and Andre Paras	3:36
6.	"Dyosa"	Yumi Lacsamana	3:37
7.	"Kakaibabe"	Donnalyn Bartolome	3:31
8.	"Labing Isang Numero"	Thyro Alfaro	3:09
9.	"Halika Na"	Shehyee feat. Ann B. Mateo	3:54
10.	"Dinggin"	Sugar High	4:17
Total length:			34:59

== Reception ==
=== Critical response ===
Diary ng Panget received mixed to negative reviews from critics.

Zig Marasigan of Rappler states that Diary ng Panget provides very little insight on the modern-day troubles of a young adult. "It succeeds in bringing together a particularly charming cast with relative newcomer Nadine Lustre leading the charge. Director Andoy Ranay does well to draw an entertaining amount of chemistry between his 4 actors, but unfortunately fails to keep the story, as well as its characters, from breaking out."

Philbert Ortiz-Dy of Click the City gave a negative review in the film, stating that "[t]he simplicity of the story is further undermined by the confusing direction. The film seems to struggle with staging a lot of scenes, the punchlines lost in the odd rhythms of the filmmaking." He also stated that "[t]he direction really fails the cast of young actors, who are acting their hearts out [...] Diary ng Panget is squandered by the subpar direction. The looseness of the narrative might have even been an asset if the direction was more inclined to make bolder or more well thought-out choices about how it presented the story."

=== Box office ===
According to the film's distributor, the film gathered PHP 12—15 million on its first day of showing. The film grossed PHP 61,324,157 on its first five days of showing according to Box Office Mojo. The movie ran for 5 weeks and by the final week of run, Box Office Mojo reported a total gross of PHP 119,534,657 (or estimated PHP 120 million) as the final box office result of the film, receiving the 9th place in the top ten highest grossing Filipino films of 2014.

== See also ==
- List of Philippine films based on Wattpad stories
