= Talk Back and You're Dead =

2014 Filipino romantic comedy action film

- Theatrical movie poster
- Directed by: Andoy L. Ranay
- Screenplay by: Keiko A. Aquino
- Story by: Alesana Marie
- Based on: Talk Back and You're Dead (novel) by Alesana Marie
- Produced by: Vic del Rosario Jr.; Charo Santos-Concio; Malou N. Santos; Enrico C. Santos
- Starring: James Reid; Nadine Lustre; Joseph Marco
- Cinematography: Pao Orendain
- Edited by: Carlo Francisco Manatad
- Music by: Teresa Barrozo
- Production company: Viva Films
- Distributed by: ABS-CBN Film Productions (Note: Co-produced under the Skylight Films label, with Star Cinema/ABS-CBN Film Productions distributing jointly with Viva Films)
- Release date: August 20, 2014
- Running time: 120 minutes
- Country: Philippines
- Languages: Filipino; English
- Box office: ₱76.9 million

Talk Back and You're Dead is a 2014 Filipino romantic comedy/action film directed by Andoy Ranay and starring James Reid, Nadine Lustre, and Joseph Marco. It is based on the bestselling novel of the same name by Alesana Marie, originally published on Wattpad. The film was distributed by Viva Films and Star Cinema's production arm Skylight Films, and was released in theaters nationwide on August 20, 2014.

== Plot ==
A boy and a girl in costumes promise each other that they will some day marry.

In the present day, Miracle Samantha "Sammy" Perez (played by Nadine Lustre) is tricked into causing a scene between her friend Michie and Timothy Odelle "Top" Pendleton (James Reid) while his girlfriend Hershey is outside. Samantha's friends admit the scene was only play acting because they want Top to break up with Hershey, but it goes viral on the internet anyway, causing trouble at school for Samantha.

At a nightclub, Top asks Samantha to date him but she refuses, with Top later getting badly hurt in a fight with a rival gang, leading to Samantha mistakenly believing that he has brain cancer and will die. Samantha agrees to be his girlfriend, but then discovers that Top is not a common gangster but the leader of the most notorious gang in the district, along with his friend Jared "Red" Dela Cruz (Joseph Marco). Top breaks up with Hershey and introduces Samantha as his new girlfriend.

Top tells his parents that he has a girlfriend and he will invite her for tomorrow's dinner. Top picks up Samantha from school and brings her to his house but the dinner ends up with Top and his father arguing about the death of Top's mother. Top breaks up with Samantha because she was too perfect for him, but Samantha has already fallen in love with him and is badly hurt by the breakup. Samantha is abducted by the rival gang but Top and his gang arrive at their hideout and overpower the other gang. Samantha calls Top an ex-convict but later invites Top to a date to make peace again. However Top humiliates Samantha in front of everyone, but later apologises, confessing his true feelings for Samantha and they become official lovers. But Samantha's cousin Lee tells Top that Samantha is bound to a fixed marriage and he can never marry her.

With no other options, Top and Samantha decide to live far away from their families, staying in Top's beach house for several days. Red and the rest of the gang arrive and Red tells Samantha that her parents know where she is and intend to sue Top for kidnapping and rape since Samantha is still a minor. Samantha decides to go home to save Top from being jailed. Back at home, Samantha's parents tell her that Top was jailed for kidnapping. Shocked, Samantha confronts Top but is surprised when he admits it, telling her that the person he kidnapped was his girlfriend, who also turned out to be his half-sister. Top actually helped her to escape from their abusive father. Samantha discovers that Lee and his parents lied to him because they want her to marry another man.

The Perez family celebrate the announcement of the marriage of their only heir, Samantha, to the eldest sibling of the Dela Cruz family, Red. Samantha, mad that she will have to marry her boyfriend's best friend, tries to convince Red to refuse the marriage. An angry Top confronts Red because of his betrayal of him, but Samantha asks Top to leave, ending their relationship because Samantha's parents are taking her and Red to France. Samantha later apologises to Top that she can't do anything about the marriage but says she still loves him, promising that she will come back for him. Top tells her that he is willing to wait for the day she returns and they kiss under fireworks.

Two years later, Samantha learns that Top got into an accident after he mysteriously vanished. Samantha and Red return home from France and Samantha realizes that Top could be at his beach house. She goes there, watching video footage of a boy and a girl making promises to each other that they will marry someday, as seen at the beginning of the film. As Samantha recalls the lost memories of her past, a dog walks through and leads her to Top on the beach. Samantha realises that he has lost his sight, and Top asks God for a miracle because he badly needs one. Samantha then hugs Top with tears of joy at their reunion.

== Cast ==
- James Reid as Timothy "Top" Odelle Pendleton
- Nadine Lustre as Miracle Samantha "Sammy" Perez
- Joseph Marco as Jared "Red" Dela Cruz
- Coraleen Waddell as Michie Sta. Maria
- Donnalyn Bartolome as China Dela Vega
- Rosalie Van Ginkel as Maggie Dela Vega
- Bret Jackson as Jacques "Jack" Maunnick
- Arkin Del Rosario as Seven Barasque
- Josh Padilla as Six Barasque
- Carlo Lazerna as Dos Cerventez
- Kiko Ramos as Philip "Pip" Morello
- King Certeza as Kyohei "Kyo" Sagara
- Aki Torio as Jun Morales
- Cliff Hogan as Romeo "Omi" D'Arrez
- Billy Villeta as Alvince "Vin" Montelegre
- Ryan Kevin as Mond Villaraza
- Clark Merced as Raine / Sun Montecillo
- Yassi Pressman as Audrey Dela Cruz
- Via Carillo as Aphrodite "Sweety" Pendleton
- Aj Muhlach as Lee Perez
- Candy Pangilinan as Selene Perez
- Bobby Andrews as Teddy Pendleton
- Cristopher Roxas as Crisostomo Perez
- Jana Victoria as Ginny Pendleton
- Isabelle Pressman as Aniya Marie "Amarie" du Courdrey

== Production ==
According to Alesana Marie, the author of the novel, Joseph Marco would have been perfect to play Timothy "Top" Pendleton, but the producers instead cast him as Jared "Red" Dela Cruz.

The movie's soundtrack is entitled "Bahala Na" (Translation: Come What May), a duet featuring the two stars of the film, Nadine Lustre and James Reid.

== Reception ==
=== Box office ===
According to the showbiz news reporter Ginger Conejero of TV Patrol, the film earned PHP 30 million on its first 3 days of showing. Box Office Mojo places the total gross at PHP 76,941,733 as of September 14, 2014, second to the top-grosser Rurouni Kenshin. There has been no official release of the final box office gross from the film's production.

=== Critical response ===
Philbert Ortiz-Dy of Click the City gave a mixed review in the film, stating that, "The film just feels hastily assembled, its only real purpose to provide another platform for the onscreen pairing of Nadine Lustre and James Reid [...] but the pair works best outside the machinations of the plot, when the movie simply gives them the room to linger in an intimate moment". He also stated that, "Talk Back and You're Dead makes so little sense that it may as well be taking place in an entirely different universe. What starts out as a weird little tale of animosity growing into affection turns into a monster of melodramatic convolutions reliant on information that's mostly hidden from the audience."

Zig Marasigan of Rappler gave a negative review of the film, stating, "Trying to make sense of Talk Back and You're Dead is very much like watching a snake eat its own tail. It's fascinatingly grotesque, watching a serpent devour itself from the outside. It slowly works towards its delicate innards, oblivious to its own demise. The snake eventually dies from its own gastric juices, and all you're left with is a reptilian corpse that is just too eager but too consumed to tell its tail from its meal. Talk Back and You're Dead doesn't have a horrible story, it simply doesn't have a story. But if a film like Talk Back and You're Dead can be produced and released without a need for story, who needs writers?"

== Sequel ==
A clip from a proposed sequel entitled Never Talk Back To A Gangster was shown during the end credits of Talk Back and You're Dead. However, as of 2026 there has been no confirmation of a sequel being made.

== See also ==
- List of Philippine films based on Wattpad stories
