= Nadine Lustre =

Filipino actress and singer (born 1993)

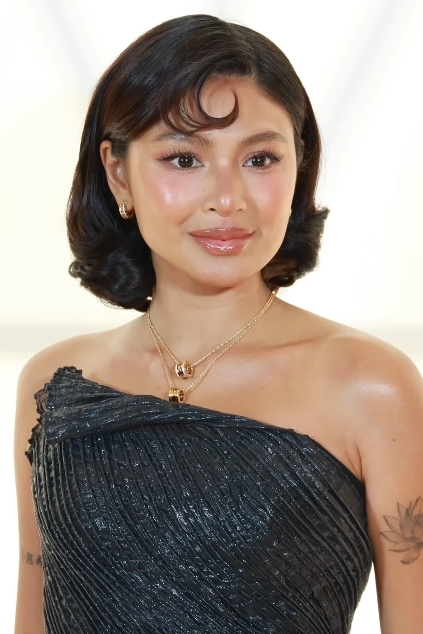
- Lustre in 2024
- Born: Nadine Alexis Paguia Lustre; October 31, 1993 (age 33); Quezon City, Philippines
- Education: Colegio de San Lorenzo
- Occupations: Actress; singer; endorser; television presenter; businesswoman; vlogger
- Years active: 2001–present
- Agent: Viva Artists Agency (since 2009)
- Partners: James Reid (2016–2020) Christophe Bariou (2021–present)
- Relatives: Jopay (cousin)
- Awards: Full list
- Musical career
- Genres: Pop; OPM
- Instruments: Vocals
- Years active: 2009–present
- Labels: Viva (2014–present); Careless Music Manila (2019–2022)
- Formerly of: Pop Girls

Nadine Alexis Paguia Lustre (Tagalog pronunciation: [naˈdin ˈlustrɛ], English: /luːstrə/ LOOS-trə; born October 31, 1993) is a Filipino actress, singer, dancer, and advocate. Regarded as one of the finest Filipino actresses in the 21st century, her accolades include six FAMAS Awards, a Gawad Urian Award, five Box Office Entertainment Awards, and four Metro Manila Film Festival Awards, as well as nominations from the MTV Europe Music Awards and the Asian Academy Creative Awards. Preview magazine named her one of the 50 most influential personalities in 2022.

Born and raised in Quezon City, Lustre began her career as a child host in several television shows at age 8. She then played minor and guest appearances in a number of films and was eventually launched as one of the members of Viva Entertainment's Pop Girls in 2009. Her breakthrough came following her pairing with James Reid and have appeared together in a string of successful projects such as Diary ng Panget (2014), Talk Back and You're Dead (2014), On the Wings of Love (2015), Para sa Hopeless Romantic (2015), Beauty and the Bestie (2015), This Time (2016) and Never Not Love You (2018). As a recording artist, she has released one studio album Wildest Dreams (2020) and has co-directed her music videos. Her musical work has earned her thirteen Myx Music Awards and a PMPC Star Awards for Music.

Philanthropically, Lustre works with various charity organizations, and has centered on raising awareness about mental health and environmental sustainability. She has launched her own cosmetics, Lustrous, and fragrance line, Luster. She was the first local Filipino celebrity to have a full make-up line with an international brand. In 2017, she was hailed as the "Sexiest Woman" by FHM Philippines. She was also the first Filipino ambassadress of Swedish fashion brand H&M and is also one of the highest paid Filipino celebrities on Instagram. Lustre's films have grossed ₱1.28 billion, making her one of the highest-grossing box office stars of this century.

== Early life and education ==
Nadine Alexis Paguia Lustre was born on October 31, 1993, in Quezon City, Philippines. She is the eldest of four children to Myraquel Paguia-Lustre and Ulysses Lustre, a mechanical engineer.

She attended Diliman Preparatory School and majored in film at Colegio de San Lorenzo along Congressional Avenue in Quezon City.

== Career ==
Lustre, at the age of eight, started as a TV host in RPN's children oriented show entitled Storyland. She was also featured in Disney Channel Asia in the Philippines as a child host. After signing with Viva Entertainment, the actress became a member of the cast in TV5's youth-oriented program Bagets and appeared in several GMA Network shows, including performances in SOP Rules. Lustre also appeared in the film Petrang Kabayo with Vice Ganda and starred in TV5 drama series, P. S. I Love You.

=== Music ===
==== 2009–2013: Pop Girls ====
Lustre debuted as one of the members in a girl group, Pop Girls which was launched by Viva Entertainment in 2009. She eventually left the group to start a solo music career.

==== 2014–2016: Nadine Lustre and collaborations with James Reid ====
In 2014, Lustre released her self-titled EP under Viva Records. It had hit singles such as “Para-paraan,” “Paligoy-ligoy,” “No Erase,” “Bahala Na,” and “Hanap-hanap;” the last three songs mentioned she collaborated with James Reid, who later on became Lustre's onscreen and real life partner couple.

In 2015, her song "Me and You", from her self-titled album, was given the Titanium Award by Australian digital radio station SBS PopAsia. Lustre is among other artists like K-pop groups Super Junior, U-KISS and Exo who had songs that achieved Titanium status.

Lustre and Callalily vocalist Kean Cipriano interpreted the song written by Mark Villar (not the Las Piñas Congressman) entitled “Sa Ibang Mundo” for the 2015 PhilPop songwriting competition. They earned the People's Choice award and the song was the second runner-up during the 2015 PhilPop's finals night held on July 25, 2015, at the Meralco Theater.

Also in 2015, Lustre collaborated with Yassi Pressman's song, “Hush,” where Lustre showed off her rap skills. Lustre and Reid also released their own version of the song “On The Wings of Love” for their teleserye with the same name.

In the 2016 Philippines Myx Music Awards, Lustre won Favorite Song and Favorite Music Video for her single “Me and You.” She also won Favorite Artist and Favorite Female Artist. Lustre also bagged the Favorite Collaboration award for her song “Hanap-Hanap” with Reid.

Lustre and Reid in 2016 also released their own version of the song “This Time” under Viva which was used for their movie with the same name.

==== 2017–2022: Careless and Wildest Dreams ====
In 2017, Lustre started collaborating with James Reid's newly founded record label, Careless Music Manila. She was featured in the song IL2LU, which was included in Reid's LP, Palm Dreams. In the same year, Lustre also collaborated with Bret Jackson in a song called "Nowhere I Wouldn't Go", which was included in the latter's album, Island City Poems.

In January 2018, Lustre released her first single under Careless Music Manila. The song is called "St4y Up". Lustre worked with Reid and music producer CRWN for the song's production. In the same month, she released a music video directed by Petersen Vargas for the single.

In March 2018, Lustre and Reid released a cover of Sugarfree's "Prom" under Viva Records, as part of the official soundtrack of their romance movie Never Not Love You.

In October 2018, Lustre was featured in three tracks from the Careless Mixtape, which consists of songs from various artists of the record label. The tracks were “I Like It,” a song she penned herself; “Summer,” which was a duet with Reid; and “Nobody,” which also featured Sofia Romualdez.

In August 2019, Lustre once again recorded songs under Viva Records for the soundtrack of her dance musical film, Indak. She was featured in the track “Sumayaw sa Indak” and in the cover of Thyro and Yumi's hit song “Triangulo.” She also had a duet called “Swerte Sa Palad Mo” with her co-star Sam Concepcion.

In November 2019, Careless released another collaborative mixtape called The Island City Playlist. Lustre was featured in the track “Headspace” along with Curtismith, Massiah, and Billy Davis. She also collaborated in a track called “No 32” with rapper Ruby Ibarra. In December 2019, Lustre officially signed a recording contract with Careless Music.

In October 2020, Lustre announced her first full-length album under Careless Music, entitled Wildest Dreams. The visual album, the first of its kind in the Philippines, garnered 1 million views in 2 days.

On October 29, 2021, she released a digital single called “Wait For Me”.

In December 2022, Lustre revealed that she parted ways with Careless Music.

==== 2023–present: Standalone singles ====
In 2023, Lustre collaborated with WILD Entertainment and released the single “Overgrown” in June, a homage to her twenties.

In 2026, Lustre released “Personal” in July, her first musical release in three years, through Cool Girl Records. In September, she released “Donuts,” a collaboration with Apl.de.ap. In October, she released “10yrs.”

=== Acting ===
==== 2011–2014: Career beginnings and breakthrough ====
Lustre started her career in film by playing bit roles in several projects produced by Viva such as Petrang Kabayo, Who's That Girl?, and When the Love is Gone. Her breakthrough role came in 2014 when she took on the role of Reah "Eya" Rodriguez in the teen romantic comedy Diary ng Panget, a Viva-produced movie based on the novel of the same name written by HaveYouSeenThisGirL. The author was very particular about who played her characters and handpicked Lustre for the role of Eya. Lustre starred together with Reid, Pressman and Andre Paras. The film was released on April 2, 2014, and earned at least 120 million pesos during its four-week run. The film received negative reviews, but the young cast was praised for their performances. Zig Marasigan of Rappler wrote, "Despite this criticism, Diary ng Panget succeeds in bringing together a particularly charming cast with relative newcomer Nadine Lustre leading the charge."

==== 2015–2016: Love team with James Reid ====
With the success of Diary ng Panget and her tandem with Reid, the pair moved on to star in the film adaptation of another Wattpad novel, Talk Back and You're Dead, which was written by Alesana Marie. The film also featured Joseph Marco and Pressman. It was released on August 20, 2014, in theaters nationwide. Lustre played the role of Miracle Samantha Perez, a rich girl who fell in love with a teenage gang leader who was also her childhood sweetheart.

In 2015, Lustre starred in her third film opposite of Reid, Para sa Hopeless Romantic, which is a film adaptation of the novel with the same name written by Marcelo Santos III. Lustre played the role of Rebecca del Mundo, a college student who writes love stories with bitter endings as a way of expressing her heartbreak. The movie received negative reviews. However, Oggs Cruz of Rappler wrote of Lustre's performance, "Lustre makes her character's seemingly unimportant struggle moving."

She also had a special role in Adolf Alix Jr.'s horror film Chain Mail as Anne Nuñez, which premiered on August 22, 2015. In December 2015, Lustre alongside Reid starred in an action comedy drama movie with Vice Ganda and Coco Martin in Beauty and the Bestie for the 2015 Metro Manila Film Festival directed by Wenn V. Deramas. As of January 25, 2016, the movie earned 526 million pesos in local and domestic screenings making it the highest-grossing Filipino film at that time. The movie received lukewarm reviews from critics. Philbert Dy of Click The City, however, praised the cast for being "so game" and "unafraid to look goofy". He remarks that Lustre is "pretty funny."

Lustre and Reid starred on their fourth movie called This Time in May 2016 which earned 15 million pesos on its opening day. The movie was directed by Nuel Naval and was loosely based on the Wattpad novel That One Summer by Aly Almario.

==== 2018–2023: Critical acclaim ====
In 2018, Lustre and Reid made a comeback to the big screen with Never Not Love You, which was directed by Antoinette Jadaone. Lustre's performance in the film earned her major awards from three of the most prestigious award-giving bodies in the Philippines, namely, the Young Critics' Circle, Gawad Urian, and FAMAS. Wanngo Gallaga of Click The City called Lustre a "powerhouse" and the "real star" of the film while praising her performance by saying that "There is a whole world of emotions within her that she carries with every movement". The Philippine Daily Inquirer's Cake Evangelista praised Lustre for being someone who "evokes a wealth of meaning and emotion"

In 2019, she starred in Irene Villamor's Ulan, her first major film project without Reid. She played the role of romance novel editor turned children's book writer Maya Landicho in the film, which uses elements of magic realism. Praising Lustre's performance in the film, Tito Valiente of Business Mirror wrote, "It has been such a long time when the camera of a local film has ever been in love with an actress. Nadine Lustre, with the face that can act, deserves that love." The film, which was co-produced by HOOQ, got recognized by the Asian Academy Creative Awards. It won several awards in the regional category of the awards procedure, including one for Best Actress. Lustre competed with other regional winners for the Grand Prize, but lost to India's Shefali Shah. Lustre next starred in the dance musical film by Paul Basinilio, Indak, opposite Sam Concepcion. She played the role of Jen, an island girl who joined a dance group after a video of her dancing went viral on social media. Lustre and Concepcion, along with other dancers in the film, went through weeks of dance training before filming began.

After a three-year break from film, Lustre starred in the suspense-drama film Greed in 2022, opposite Diego Loyzaga and directed by Yam Laranas. She won her second FAMAS Best Actress award for her role as Kichi, a lottery winner who escapes town to protect her winnings from the greedy townspeople. In the same year, she played Lyra, an online content moderator, in Mikhail Red's techno-horror film Deleter. An entry to the 2022 Metro Manila Film Festival, the film earned ₱270 million in the box office, making it the festival's top-grosser and the highest grossing Filipino film of 2022. Lustre won the festival's Best Actress award.

==== 2024–present: Continued success ====
In 2024, she portrayed an overseas worker haunted by a supernatural curse in the folk horror Nokturno, her second film with Red. That same year, she returned to the Metro Manila Film Festival through Dan Villegas’ Uninvited, opposite Vilma Santos and Aga Muhlach, as the drug-addicted daughter of a corrupt billionaire. The latter earned her the Best Supporting Actress award at the FAMAS 2025, the Movie Supporting Actress of the Year at the 53rd Box Office Entertainment Awards, as well as nominations from the Star Awards for Movies, EDDYs Awards, and Metro Manila Film Festival.

She reunited with Vice Ganda after ten years in Call Me Mother, an entry to the 2025 Metro Manila Film Festival directed by Jun Lana, where she received a Best Actress nomination, and the film went on to become the highest grossing Filipino film of 2025.

==== Television ====
On August 26, 2014, Lustre and Reid signed a two-year exclusive contract with ABS-CBN at an event attended by some of the prominent figures of the station. The contract signed Lustre and Reid as ABS-CBN's new loveteam. Any music, films or television shows headlined by them will be released under ABS-CBN and Viva.

Their television project with ABS-CBN was Wansapanataym's month-long special entitled My App Boyfie in October 2014, where Lustre portrayed the lead female role Anika Andres.

Lustre and Reid moved on to their MMK debut for its Valentine's Day episode, titled Signs of Love, where the actress played the role of Carmina Joven.

On VIVA Channel, Lustre and Reid starred in their own show called #JaDine where every project given to them from endorsement, commercial, TV, and film shoots are documented and shown every 7 p.m. (PHT) on Wednesdays.

Lustre's breakthrough and most prominent role to date is Leah Olivar on the romantic comedy series On The Wings Of Love, which she starred alongside Reid as her leading man. The teleserye was originally supposed to run for 10 weeks but was extended for another three months. The show ended on February 26, 2016, with a live finale viewing in Ynares Center, Antipolo. The teleserye made Nadine Lustre and her partner James Reid household names in Philippine showbusiness.

A 4-episode TV special dubbed "JaDine Flying High on Love" also aired in ABS-CBN showing the travels of Lustre and Reid in Doha, Dubai, Paris, London, Milan, Rome, Verona, and Vatican City.

In 2016, Lustre and Reid starred on their 2nd teleserye, on the ABS-CBN Primetime Bida series entitled Till I Met You.

In 2017, the pair joined It's Showtime as hosts.

In 2019, Lustre appeared as a guest judge for its segment BidaMan. She also served as one of the judges of Your Moment alongside Boy Abunda and Billy Crawford.

In 2022, she appeared in the first season of Drag Race Philippines as a guest judge.

In 2023, she starred in the action thriller television miniseries Roadkillers. It was her first television series in almost seven years.

In 2025, she joined the third season of Masked Singer Pilipinas as one of the panelists alongside Pops Fernandez, Janno Gibbs, and Arthur Nery.

In 2026, she starred in the romantic drama series Love, Siargao with Alden Richards.

=== Concerts ===
On February 20, 2016, Lustre and Reid had their first major concert titled "JaDine in Love" at the Smart Araneta Coliseum. Within seven hours after the concert announcement, there was already a total of ₱9 million in ticket revenues. It was announced during the presscon that tickets for general admission is sold out, and SRO (Standing Room Only) tickets were made available for purchase by producers due to high demand.

JaDine in Love was produced by Viva Concerts and ABS-CBN's entertainment unit Dreamscape. Performing in front of a sold-out crowd, the two were joined by guest performers Pressman, Myrtle Sarrosa, Elmo Magalona, Vice Ganda, Erik Santos, and Kyla. Other notable guests were their co-actors in On The Wings Of Love. Due to the clamor of their fans overseas, Lustre and Reid held a "Jadine in Love World Tour" last March 2016. They brought their modified Araneta Concert in Doha, Dubai, London, and Milan with new special guests such as Yeng Constantino, Jay R, and Tart Carlos. On May 12, 2016, Lustre and Reid flew to North America to start their second world tour called "JaDine High on Love" in the United States and Canada.

On February 9, 2018, Lustre and Reid had their second major concert entitled "Revolution: a JaDine Concert at Araneta Coliseum".

To promote Wildest Dreams, she embarked on her solo debut digital concert “Absolute Madness” in July 2021 via Kumu Live.

=== Directing ===
In 2017, Lustre co-directed the music video of Reid's "The Life" with film director Petersen Vargas. The music video was released in December 2017. It won the Music Video of the Year award at the 2017 Myx Music Awards. Lustre's follow up project as a music video director came in January 2019 for her duet with Reid entitled "Summer". She shares directing credit for the video with Chino Villagracia of The Visual Club.

=== Other ventures ===
==== Lustrous ====
In April 2018, Lustre launched her first ever make-up collection called Lustrous in collaboration with the international Australian brand, BYS. Lustre is the first ever Filipina celebrity to collaborate with the international brand. In a private launch held on March 23, she mentioned that she shares the same advocacy with BYS which stands for "be your self" and said that "It's nice to be able to work with a brand who inspires all the girls to be themselves." The event was hosted in Flossom Kitchen and Cafe by one of her closest friends Kiana Valenciano, daughter of singer-songwriter, musician and actor Gary Valenciano.

The make-up line consists of a contour & highlight kit, lip & cheek tints in the shade Raw and Vermillion, eye shadow palettes in the shades Luna and Calypso, eyeliners in the shades Turquoise, Moonstone and Sapphire, mascaras in the shades Void and Lazuli and an eyebrow pencil & eyebrow gel in the shade Natural Brown. Each item is contained in a gold packaging and comes with different glittery, red and brownish shades. The make-up line also offers a gift box that contains one shade of each item and is placed in a pink box with a tropical design. Lustrous is available in selected SM Beauty and Watsons stores nationwide.

==== Luster ====
In December 2018, Lustre released her signature fragrance called Luster. The fragrance was first teased by Lustre in 2017 when she posted several boudoir-themed photos from the campaign. She revealed the project on Valentine's night. In an interview with Preview, Lustre revealed details about how she personally and independently produced and conceptualized the product. The idea came from her mother who knew a chemist who makes perfumes. She then started conceptualizing the campaign, which was inspired by "boudoir photos, 18th-century fashion photos, and vintage Vogue" She revealed that she chose such themes because she wanted to show everyone that she is "slowly changing and growing into a woman." The perfume bottle was made to look like a "love potion or an 18th century perfume bottle" For the campaign, Lustre worked with photographer BJ Pascual. The packaging was designed by artist Soleil Ignacio. When asked about what it means to her to have her own brand of perfume, Lustre said, ""What does it mean for me? For me, this perfume, Luster, showcases my creativity as a person. It showcases my character because it's the scent that I like. I'm selling you myself. I'm selling you a piece of me. This is as personal as it gets. This is me showing everyone na ito ako. This is what I can do. This is the real me. When you buy the perfume, it's like literally taking me with you wherever you are."

After some delay, Luster was officially launched on December 22, 2018. The fragrance was described as having a "signature powdery fragrance with a luscious vanilla scent". Lustre released brand new promotional photos, which were "Thumbelina-inspired" and featured life-sized peonies. For this campaign, Lustre collaborated with photographer Xander Angeles and her make up artist, Jelly Eugenio.

In February 2019, Lustre held an official launch event for the fragrance line in the form of a pop up store. The event was held at Vetro, an art gallery in Quezon City.

==== Swimsuit line with H&M ====
In February 2019, Lustre became the first Filipino ambassador of fast fashion giant H&M. On March 14 of the same year, her swimwear line collaboration with the brand, which was called Selected by Nadine, was released. A second wave of Lustre's special swimwear line was released the following month.

In June 2020, Lustre appeared alongside actress Maja Salvador for another campaign for H&M's swimwear line. The collection was called Selected by Nadine and Maja. The collection was supposed to be launched in March, but was pushed back because of the COVID-19 pandemic.

==== Maison Bukana Wines ====
In 2023, Lustre and Christopher Bariou ventured into winemaking through “Maison Bukana Wines,” wine brand that merges French viticulture with Filipino design, which also involves rental properties.

==== Dehusk ====
In their vision of sustainability and animal welfare, Lustre and Bariou launched their new fortified coconut milk "Dehusk" in December 2024.

==== De Verde Siaragao ====
In 2024, Lustre and her boyfriend Chris opened De Verde Siaragao, a vegan restaurant in Siaragao.

== Musical influences ==
Lustre is a fan of American popstar Lady Gaga, whom she once called her "ultimate idol". Discussing the popstar, Lustre has said, "She's very creative, she's out of this world. That's why I really love everything that she does. I love following her. I like her fashion sense, everything about her. Her creativity and her beauty, everything about her is just so unconventional. It's not the usual. It's really fascinating, and how talented she is." Sharing that she has seen Lady Gaga's Netflix documentary Gaga: Five Foot Two "over ten times", Lustre said, "She's real, she's honest. She's not afraid to show everyone who she really is, and I’m learning from that." Lustre has a tattoo on her finger that says "ohh la la", which is a reference to Lady Gaga's Bad Romance.

Lustre has listed "Moments" by Jhené Aiko, "Way Back" by Amber Mark, "A Sky Full of Stars" by Coldplay, Army of Me by Bjork, and Digital Love by Daft Punk as the five songs that changed her life. When asked by Rappler to cite an album she thinks has shaped the 2010s, she answered Capacities by Up Dharma Down, saying, "The music and lyrics also speak to me in a way that I can never explain. Until now, I still listen to the whole album and it always feels like the first time listening to it."

Lustre enjoys listening to "future bass, deep house, and the newer EDM sound that's going around". She has also referred to Rihanna, Ariana Grande, and Coldplay as her "all-time favorite artists. When making music, she considers Tinashe, Doja Cat, and Jhene Aiko as some of her inspirations.

== Personal life ==
In February 2016, Lustre’s relationship with her on-screen partner James Reid (actor) was publicly confirmed when Reid announced that they were dating. After nearly four years together, the couple announced the end of their relationship on January 20, 2020.

She later began dating Christopher Bariou.

Lustre is known as a mental health advocate. She has been outspoken about issues and advocacies such as her advocacy for mental health awareness, her support for the environmental activist group Greenpeace, her call for women's independence, and the need for the government to address the 2020 COVID-19 crisis with "help, compassion and transparency, not threats and lies." She is also a vegan.

=== Political views ===
Lustre supported the Mamamayang Liberal (ML) party-list in the 2025 Philippine House of Representatives elections.

== Filmography ==
=== Film ===
Year	Title	Role	Notes	Ref.
2010	Petrang Kabayo	Dina Helena	Cameo	
2011	Who's That Girl?	Marian (Elizabeth's Secretary)	Cameo	
2013	The Fighting Chefs	Sexy Chef		
2013	When the Love Is Gone	Jenny's friend	Cameo	
2014	Diary ng Panget	Reah "Eya" Rodriguez	Main Cast	
2014	Talk Back and You're Dead	Miracle Samantha Perez		
2015	Para sa Hopeless Romantic	Rebecca Del Mundo	Distributed by Viva Films, Star Cinema	
2015	Chain Mail	Anne Nuñez	Special role	
2015	Beauty and the Bestie	Abi Villavicencio	Presented in 2015 Metro Manila Film Festival	
2016	This Time	Ava Buhay	Main role	
2018	Never Not Love You	Joanne Candelaria		
2019	Ulan	Maya Landicho		
2019	Indak	Janice "Jen	Main role	
2020	Wildest Dreams	Herself	Visual album	
2022	Greed	Kichi	Vivamax Original Film	
2022	Deleter	Lyra	Presented in 2022 Metro Manila Film Festival	
2024	Nokturno	Jamie		
2024	Uninvited	Nicolette Chantal "Nicole" Remegio Vega	Presented in 2024 Metro Manila Film Festival	
2025	Call Me Mother	Mara de Jesus	Presented in 2025 Metro Manila Film Festival	

=== Television series ===
Year	Title	Role	Ref.
2006	Maalaala Mo Kaya: Regalo	Herself	
2011–2012	Bagets: Just Got Lucky	Georgina Evangelista / Victorian "Rhian" De Luna/ Justine Magtanggol	
2011–2012	P. S. I Love You	Candince Tuazon	
2014	Wansapanataym: My App Boyfie	Anika Andres	
2015	Maalaala Mo Kaya: Stuffed Toy	Carmina Joven	
2015–2016	On The Wings of Love	Leah Olivar-Medina	
2016–2017	Till I Met You	Iris Duico-Valderama	
2023	Roadkillers	Stacey	
2026	Love, Siargao	Kara	

=== Television shows ===
Year	Title	Role	Ref.
2002	Storyland	Host	
2005	Disney Channel On Assignment	Host	
2009–2010	SOP	Performer	
2010–2011	Party Pilipinas	Performer	
2011–2012	Hey It's Saberdey!	Host	
2012	Sunday Funday	Performer	
2013	WaPak – Winner ang Pakwela at Kulitan	Herself	
2014–2020	#JaDine	Herself	
2017–2018; 2025–present	It's Showtime	Host / Guest / Performer	
2019	It's Showtime: Bidaman	Judge	
2019–2020	Your Moment	Judge	
2022	Drag Race Philippines	Judge	
2025	Masked Singer Pilipinas 3	Panelist	
2026	Pinoy Big Brother: Celebrity Collab Edition 2.0	Houseguest	

== Discography ==
Album

- Wildest Dreams (2020)

Collaborative album

- Pop Girls

Extended Play

- Nadine Lustre

Mixtapes

- Careless

Soundtrack

- Diary ng Panget
- Never not love you
- Indak

== Awards and nominations ==
Lustre has received various awards and nominations including six FAMAS Award, five Box Office Entertainment Awards, four Metro Manila Film Festival, a PMPC Star Awards for Movies, a PMPC Star Awards for Television, a Young Critics Circle Award and an Asian Academy Creative Awards.

In music, she has also received severals awards and nominations for her songs and albums including thirteen Myx Music Awards, two awards from Philippine Popular Music Festival, a PMPC Star Awards for Music, a SBS PopAsia Titanium Award and a nomination from MTV Europe Music Awards.
