= Tasya =

Tasya may refer to:

== People ==
- Tasya Teles (born 1985), Canadian actress
- Tasya van Ree (born 1976), American painter and photographer

== Entertainment ==
- Tasya Fantasya (2008 TV series), 2008 Philippine television drama fantasy romance series broadcast by GMA Network
- Tasya Fantasya (2016 TV series), 2016 weekly Philippine drama-fantasy-comedy series broadcast by TV5
