= Chiong murder case =

Murder case in the Philippines

- Jacqueline (left) and Marijoy (right) Chiong
- Location: Cebu City, Philippines
- Date: July 16, 1997 (29 years ago); Approx. 10 o'clock in the evening
- Attack type: Kidnapping, rape, murder
- Victims: Jacqueline and Marijoy Chiong
- Perpetrator: Francisco Juan "Paco" Larrañaga
- Assailants: 6 others

People of the Philippines v. Francisco Juan Larrañaga et al
- Court: Supreme Court of the Philippines
- Full case name: People of the Philippines versus Francisco Juan Larrañaga alias "Paco"; Josman Aznar; Rowen Adlawan alias "Wesley"; Alberto Cao alias "Allan Pahak"; Ariel Balanasag; Davidson Ariel Rusia alias "Tisoy Tagalog"; James Anthony Uy alias "Wangwang" and James Andrew Uy alias "MM"
- Decided: February 3, 2004
- Citation: 466 Phil. 324 (G R. Nos. 138874-75)

Case history
- Prior actions: Respondents found guilty beyond reasonable doubt of simple kidnapping and serious illegal detention and are sentenced to suffer the penalty of reclusión perpetua (Criminal Case No. CBU-45303 and 45304)
- Appealed from: Regional Trial Court Branch 7, Cebu City
- Appealed to: Court of Appeals of the Philippines
- Subsequent actions: Lobbied by Fair Trials International to the United Nations Commission on Human Rights, European Union, Amnesty International and Spanish Government. Respondent Larrañaga was transferred to Spain to observe his prison term, by virtue of Treaty on the Transfer of Sentenced Persons
- Related action: Abolition of Capital punishment in the Philippines

Ruling
- Respondents are guilty beyond reasonable doubt of the special complex crime of kidnapping and serious illegal detention with homicide and rape and are sentenced to suffer the penalty of death by lethal injection. Motion for reconsideration denied by the Supreme Court en banc

Court membership
- Judges sitting: Hilario Davide Jr., Reynato Puno, Artemio Panganiban, Leonardo Quisumbing, Consuelo Ynares-Santiago, Angelina Sandoval-Gutierrez, Antonio Carpio, Alicia Austria-Martinez, Renato Corona, Conchita Carpio-Morales, Romeo Callejo Sr., Adolfo Azcuna, Dante Tinga, Minita Chico-Nazario, Cancio C. Garcia

Case opinions
- Per Curiam

Laws applied
- Philippine criminal law

The Chiong murder case (People of the Philippines v. Francisco Juan Larrañaga et al.) was a trial regarding an incident on July 16, 1997, in Cebu City, in which sisters Marijoy and Jacqueline Chiong were allegedly kidnapped, raped, and murdered.

Francisco Juan "Paco" Larrañaga (b. 1977), a man of dual Filipino and Spanish citizenship was, along with six others, convicted of murder, and sentenced to death by lethal injection on February 3, 2004. Larrañaga was later commuted to life imprisonment, following the abolition of capital punishment in the Philippines in June 2006, and was transferred to Spain to serve out his sentence in October 2009.

The Chiong sisters remain missing to this day.

== Trial ==
=== Prosecution ===
According to the prosecutors, at 10:00 p.m. on July 16, 1997, Larrañaga and six other defendants kidnapped the Chiong sisters near a mall in Cebu, raped them, and then threw Marijoy's body into a ravine. This was later disputed because there was no formal identification of the body, and it was later determined that it was not the body of one of the sisters. Jacqueline's body was never found.

The testimony of a co-defendant, Davidson Valiente Rusia, was central to the prosecutors' case against Larrañaga. Rusia testified in exchange for blanket immunity. Despite the fact that Rusia's direct testimony lasted days, the trial court only allowed Larrañaga's counsel to cross-examine him for half an hour. During that half-hour, Larrañaga's attorney established that Rusia lied to both the prosecution and the court about his prior convictions. Rusia claimed he had never been convicted of a crime, but he had a history of burglary and forgery; when confronted with this evidence, Rusia fainted. Davidson Rusia is a convicted felon who was a gang member and was sentenced to prison twice in the United States for other crimes. Rusia claimed that he was with Larrañaga in Ayala Center, Cebú early in the evening of July 16, the evening Larrañaga says that he was at R&R Restaurant in Quezon City with his friends. Rusia was unknown to Larrañaga and only appeared as a "state witness" 10 months after the event.

=== Defense ===
Forty five witnesses, including Larrañaga's teachers and classmates at the Center for Culinary Arts (CCA) in Quezon City, testified under oath that he was in Quezon City, when the crime is said to have taken place in Cebu City. However, the trial court considered these testimonies irrelevant, rejecting these as coming from "friends of the accused," and they were not admitted. During his trial in the Cebu Regional Trial Court (RTC) Branch 7, defense lawyers sought to present evidence of his whereabouts on the evening of the crime—that Larrañaga, at that time 19 years old, was at a party at the R&R Restaurant along Katipunan Avenue, Quezon City, and stayed there until early morning the following day. After the party, the logbook of the security guard at Larrañaga's condominium indicates that Larrañaga returned to his Quezon City condominium at 2:45 a.m.

Rowena Bautista, an instructor, and chef at the culinary center said Larrañaga was in school from 8 a.m. to 11:30 a.m. and saw him again at about 6:30 p.m on July 16. The school's registrar, Caroline Calleja, said she proctored a two-hour exam where Larrañaga was present from 1:30 p.m. Larrañaga attended his second round of midterm exams on July 17 commencing at 8 a.m. Only then did Larrañaga leave for Cebu in the late afternoon of July 17, 1997.

Airline and airport personnel also came to court with their flight records, indicating that Larrañaga did not take any flight on July 16, 1997, nor was he on board any chartered aircraft that landed in or departed from Cebu during the relevant dates, except the 5 p.m. PAL flight on July 17, 1997, from Manila to Cebu.

Nevertheless, the Supreme Court upheld the conviction of the accused without reasonable doubt.

=== Verdict ===
The seven co-defendants were convicted of murder and sentenced to death by lethal injection on February 3, 2004.

Larrañaga's counsels Felicitas Aquino Arroyo and Sandra Marie Olaso Coronel urged the high court to admit the amicus curiae from the Basque Bar Council (BBC), Barcelona Bar Associations (BBA) and Bar Association of Madrid. The three organizations expressed their interests in the case of Larrañaga since he was a "Spanish citizen with origins in the Basque Country, and therefore a member of the European Union." The BBA mentioned that the execution of a Spanish citizen would be in breach of the violation of the principle of reciprocity in international law, noting that if a Filipino citizen is found guilty in Spain, no Spanish court would have imposed the death penalty, nor would have allowed him extradited to any country imposing capital punishment. Former Ambassador Sedfrey Ordóñez claims he is the victim of a mistrial.

Fair Trials International (FTI), an NGO working on behalf of those who face a miscarriage of justice in a country other than their own, entered an amicus brief which was submitted to the Supreme Court of the Philippines by the European Commission's Manila delegate. The amicus argued that under both international and Philippine law, Larrañaga had been the subject of an unfair trial and had never been given the opportunity to show his innocence. FTI has since represented Larrañaga before the United Nations, appealing against injustice in the Philippines. Sarah de Mas, spokesperson for FTI who brought the case to the attention of the European Parliament and successive presidencies of the European Union, stated that Larrañaga had served a lengthy sentence for a crime he could not have committed.

== Aftermath ==
Years after the verdict, questions still linger, and there is dissatisfaction with the outcome of events on both sides.

=== Abolition of the death penalty ===
On June 24, 2006, capital punishment was abolished in the Philippines.

=== Transfer of Larrañaga to Spain ===
On December 3, 2007, Spanish Foreign Minister Miguel Ángel Moratinos stated that Spain will be "happy" if Larrañaga spends his life sentence in a jail "here" as the Treaty on the Transfer of Sentenced Persons comes into force: "We don't know when this will happen. We have no time period. We feel happy that Mr. Larrañaga can come back with this treaty." The treaty, which will allow convicted persons of either country to return to his home country and spend his sentence there, was ratified by the Philippines—17 affirmative and two abstentions—on November 26. The Philippines has signed similar treaties with Canada, Cuba, Hong Kong, and Thailand.

Larrañaga is the son of Spanish pelotari Manuel Larrañaga and Filipino Margarita González, and, through his mother, is a member of the influential Osmeña clan of Cebu. Philippine Senator Miriam Defensor-Santiago said that, "Larrañaga's case could be covered by the treaty only if the Supreme Court issued a final ruling on his conviction, which remained on appeal before the high tribunal".

In September 2009, the Department of Justice approved Larrañaga's transfer to a Spanish prison. Thelma Chiong, the mother of the victims, expressed shock over the decision, saying that, despite Larrañaga's Spanish citizenship, "If you committed a crime in the Philippines, you are jailed in the Philippines," despite the fact that this would constitute a breach of the treaty and thus of international law. Chief Presidential Legal Counsel Raúl González himself expressed concern that the Philippines might be branded a rogue state if it did not comply with the provisions of the treaty.

Larrañaga, escorted by two Spanish Interpol agents, left for Spain on October 6, 2009. His good behavior at the New Bilibid Prison was taken into consideration, and he will serve the rest of his sentence at the Madrid Central Penitentiary at Soto del Real. According to Philippine Justice Secretary Agnes Devanadera, Philippine law will continue to be observed for the remainder of Larrañaga's prison term. Dionisio Chiong, the father of the victims, said in Cebuano, "I'm tired. The family is tired of this case. We fought to get a conviction but the government clearly wanted to bring him to Spain. We can't beat the government." He also expressed resentment that he and his wife only learned about Larrañaga's departure through the media.

Less than a week after Larrañaga's transfer, two Filipinos incarcerated in the Philippines stated their wish to also serve the rest of their sentences in Spain under the provisions of the treaty. A supporter of Larrañaga has also sought a reinvestigation of the murder case in order to clear the six other convicts.

Thelma Chiong expressed the possibility of her and her husband, Dionisio, visiting Larrañaga in Spain. Larrañaga, born in 1977, will be 61 when he is released.

=== Release of Aznar, Balansag, Caño and Anthony Uy ===
On August 30, 2019, Senator Panfilo Lacson stated that some of the convicts of the 1997 murder of the Chiong sisters are now out of prison. Subsequently, Bureau of Corrections director Nicanor Faeldon confirmed the release of Josman Aznar, Ariel Balansag, Alberto Caño and James Anthony Uy, the four persons who were convicted for the murder. On September 4, President Rodrigo Duterte fired Faeldon after the latter approved the release of three convicts in the murder case. On September 5, the Chiong sisters' parents called on Duterte to return the three convicts back to prison, after which Duterte announced the surrender of the released convicts for good conduct. The parents also called for the investigation of Faeldon's actions.

On September 6, Ariel Balansag and Alberto Caño, two of the three convicts in the case who were released by virtue of the controversial Good Conduct Time Allowance Law, surrendered to the authorities. On September 18, James Anthony Uy and Josman Aznar, the last two of the four convicts of the said case, also surrendered to the authorities.

== Popular culture ==
Film adaptations

- The incident was featured in an episode of the 1998 TV crime-drama series Calvento Files hosted by Tony Calvento on ABS-CBN. It starred Niño Muhlach as Paco Larrañaga, Jennifer Sevilla as Jacqueline Chiong, Gina Alajar as Thelma Chiong, and Ruben Austria as Dionisio Chiong.
- Animal (Butakal: Sugapa sa Laman), a 2004 film directed by Toto Natividad loosely based on the Chiong Sisters case.
- Give Up Tomorrow, a 2011 documentary by Michael Collins and Marty Syjuco that tells the story from Larrañaga’s perspective.
- Jacqueline Comes Home, a 2018 biographical film directed by Ysabelle Peach Caparas, starring Meg Imperial and Donnalyn Bartolome as the Chiong Sisters.

== Timeline of the murder case ==
- Night of July 16–17, 1997 – Francisco Juan "Paco" Larrañaga and six others kidnapped sisters Marijoy and Jacqueline Chiong outside a mall in Cebu. Larrañaga, Josman Aznar, and James Anthony Uy took turns raping the sisters. Marijoy's allegedly body was found 2 days later, but it was determined that it wasn't Marijoy's body. Jacqueline's body was never found, according to the testimonies of suspect-turned-state witness Davidson Valiente Rusia.
- May 5, 1999 – Larrañaga and six others were convicted of kidnapping and serious illegal detention with homicide and rape.
- February 3, 2004 – The Supreme Court has imposed the death penalty on all suspects except Uy, who was a minor when the crime was committed.
- July 2005 – The Supreme Court affirmed the convictions.
- June 24, 2006 – President Gloria Macapagal Arroyo signed Republic Act No. 9346, abolishing the use of capital punishment.
- December 3, 2007 – Spanish Foreign Minister Miguel Ángel Moratinos convinced the Philippine government to allow Larrañaga, a Spanish citizen, to serve his sentence in Spain under a bilateral treaty signed in November that year.
- October 6, 2009 – Larrañaga is allowed to serve the remainder of his sentence at the Madrid Central Penitentiary at Soto del Real.
- June 25, 2019 – The Supreme Court decided to void certain portions of RA No. 10592, which grants additional good conduct time allowance to inmates, thereby making its application retroactive instead of prospective.
- September 2, 2019 – Bureau of Corrections Director General Nicanor Faeldon confirmed the release of Aznar, Balansag, Caño, and Uy, the four persons convicted for the 1997 murder of the Chiong Sisters.
- September 4, 2019 – President Rodrigo Duterte fired Faeldon for approving the release of the four convicts.
- September 6, 2019 – Balansag and Caño, who were released by virtue of the controversial Good Conduct Time Allowance Law, surrendered to the authorities.
- September 18, 2019 – Uy and Aznar also surrendered to the authorities.
