= Double Barrel =

Double Barrel may refer to:

- Multiple-barrel firearm
- "Double Barrel" (song), a 1970 reggae single by Dave and Ansell Collins
- Double Barrel (album), a 2009 hip hop album by Marco Polo and Torae
- Double Barrel (2015 film), an Indian Malayalam-language crime-comedy film
- Double Barrel (2017 film), a Philippine action film

== See also ==
- Double-barrelled (disambiguation)
