= Para sa Broken Hearted =

Filipino drama film

- Theatrical release poster
- Directed by: Digo Ricio
- Screenplay by: Rinka Romero Sycip
- Story by: Marcelo Santos III
- Based on: Para sa Broken Hearted by Marcelo Santos III
- Produced by: Vic del Rosario Jr.
- Starring: Yassi Pressman; Sam Concepcion; Marco Gumabao; Louise delos Reyes; Shy Carlos
- Cinematography: Neil Daza
- Edited by: Tara Illenberger
- Music by: Mikey Amistoso; Jazz Nicolas
- Production company: Sari-Sari Network Films
- Distributed by: Viva Films
- Release date: 3 October 2018
- Running time: 92 minutes
- Country: Philippines
- Language: Filipino
- Box office: ₱800 thousand (Opening day)

Para sa Broken Hearted (transl. For the Broken Hearted) is a 2018 Filipino drama film written and directed by Digo Ricio, starring Yassi Pressman, Sam Concepcion, Marco Gumabao, Louise delos Reyes and Shy Carlos. The film was produced by Viva Films and it was released in the Philippines on 3 October 2018.

== Cast ==
- Yassi Pressman as Alot
- Sam Concepcion as Alex
- Marco Gumabao as RJ
- Louise delos Reyes as Kath
- Shy Carlos as Jackie Reyes
- Katya Santos
- Andrea del Rosario
- Lander Vera-Perez
- Christopher Roxas
- DJ Durano
- Lollie Mara
- Gary Lim
- Jana Victoria
- Abby Bautista
- Arvic James Tan
- Bob Jbeili
