= Kim Molina =

Filipino singer and actress (born 1991)

Kim Molina-Napoles
- Born: Kimverlie Soriano Molina; July 1, 1991 (age 35); Manila, Philippines
- Occupations: Singer; actress
- Years active: 2009–present
- Agent: Viva Artists Agency (2011–present)
- Spouse: Jerald Napoles (m. 2026)

Kimverlie Soriano Molina-Napoles (born July 1, 1991), popularly known as Kim Molina, is a Filipino singer and actress, known for portraying Aileen in the long-running Filipino stage musical Rak Of Aegis (2014—2019), Savannah in the drama series Kadenang Ginto (2018), Peng in the digital iWant movie MOMOL Nights (2019), and Elsa in the mainstream film Jowable (2019).

== Early and personal life ==
Molina grew up in Saudi Arabia where her parents work. Her father is a well-established dentist. She studied in Al Jazeera International School in Dammam.

In August 2024, Jerald Napoles and Molina announced their engagement, 10 years after they first met at the PETA theater; they eventually married on March 1, 2026.

== Early life and career ==
=== Singing ===
Molina started singing at the age of two. She began performing as front act to local Filipino artists' in the Middle East shows at the age of five. At 14, she won ABS-CBN's Middle East search for The Filipino Channel Pop Star, besting winners from Kuwait, Bahrain, Saudi Arabia, and Dubai. In 2009 she was chosen to represent the Middle East for the World Championships of the Performing Arts in Los Angeles, California. She was a multi-medalist and was awarded the title Senior Grand Champion Vocalist Of The World.

=== Theater ===
As a stage actress, she had her professional theatre debut with Viva Atlantis' production of Disney's Tarzan in 2013. She was then included in the original Asian cast of Carrie: the Musical as Frieda, and played the role of Oda Mae Brown's younger sister Louise in the musical stage adaptation of the movie Ghost, both under Atlantis Productions.

In June 2014, Molina got her first lead theatre role as Aileen (alternating with Aicelle Santos) in the hit Pinoy musical Rak of Aegis. For her performance in Rak of Aegis, she was awarded Best Actress in a Musical by Gawad Buhay. She then landed projects for television and film.

In March 2023, Molina returned to the theatre scene as Zsazsa Zaturnnah in Zsazsa Zaturnnah the Musical... 'Yun Lang!, produced by the Ateneo Blue Repertory and under the direction of Missy Maramara.

=== Television and film ===
At the 2015 Metro Manila Film Festival, she earned a Best Supporting Actress award nomination for her portrayal of Luli in WalangForever, which starred Jennylyn Mercado and was directed by Dan Villegas.

In 2016, she became a talent of Viva Films. In the same year, she starred in Camp Sawi alongside Bela Padilla, Arci Muñoz, Yassi Pressman, and Andi Eigenmann.

In 2017, Molina was awarded Best Performance by a Female Recording Artist in the Awit Awards for her debut single "Naluluha Ako" under Viva Records.

She starred alongside Sarah Geronimo in the 2018 Philippine adaptation of the Korean movie musical, Miss Granny.

In 2019, Molina top-billed in two films: first, in the digital iWant movie Momol Nights alongside actor Kit Thompson, then in #Jowable. Because of the box office success of her films that year, she was awarded Most Promising Female Star for Movies at the 51st Guillermo Mendoza Awards 2020 Box Office Entertainment Awards.

In October 2020, she was chosen to be one of the Celebrity Judge Detectives of Masked Singer Pilipinas, the Philippine edition of The Masked Singer franchise that followed a 2nd season on 2022. She also hosted the second season of Born to Be a Star alongside Matteo Guidicelli.

== Filmography ==
=== Film ===
Year	Title	Role	Notes
2015	Chain Mail	Karen	Cameo role
2015	The Love Affair	Lindsay	Supporting role
2015	#WalangForever	Luli	Supporting role
2016	Camp Sawi	Joan	Main role
2017	Extra Service	Mari Susomo	Supporting role
2017	Luck At First Sight	Kate	
2017	Fangirl/Fanboy	EP	
2017	The Write Moment	Charmaine	Special Participation
2018	Ang Dalawang Mrs. Reyes	Aira	Supporting role
2018	Ang Pambansang Third Wheel	Grace	
2018	Miss Granny	Minnie	Supporting role
2019	3pol Trobol: Huli Ka Balbon!	Vilma	Guest role
2019	MOMOL Nights	Peng	Main role
2019	#Jowable	Elsa Mangahas	Main role
2019	Unforgettable	Chuchay	Main role
2020	Love the Way U Lie	Janna	Main role
2021	Ang Babaeng Walang Pakiramdam	Anastacia Quingquing	Main role
2021	Ikaw At Ako At Ang Ending	Mylene	Main role
2023	Girlfriend na Pwede na	Pam	Main role
2024	My Zombabe	Yasmine / Jasmine Alcantara	Main role
2024	Seoulmeyt	Luneta Paticul	Main role
2025	Un-Ex You	Zuri Yolanda Soriano	Main role
2025	Everyone Knows Every Juan	Isay	Guest role
2026	Wonderful Nightmare	Atty. Maria Luisa "Lui" Manuel / Mary Grace Alcantara	Main role

=== Television ===
Year	Title	Role	Notes
2009	Rated K	Herself	Guest
2009	ASAP Natin To	Herself	Guest
2014	Umagang Kay Ganda	Herself	Guest
2014	It's Showtime	Herself	Guest
2014	Maalaala Mo Kaya	Tresh	Supporting role
2015	Banana Split	Herself	Guest
2015	ASAP	Herself	Guest
2015	It's Showtime	Herself	Guest
2015	Wansapanataym	Jessica	Supporting role
2015	Maalaala Mo Kaya	Rea Mae	Supporting role
2015	You're My Home	Desiree	Supporting role
2016	Eat Bulaga!	Herself	Guest
2016	Dear Uge	Babe	Supporting role
2016	Tasya Fantasya	Jala	Supporting role
2016	It's Showtime	Herself	Guest
2016	Family Feud	Player	Guest/Player
2016–2017	Till I Met You	Kelly	Supporting role
2017	A Love to Last	Anjanette	Guest cast
2017	La Luna Sangre	Hasmin	Guest cast
2018	Sana Dalawa ang Puso	Amy Mallan	Guest cast
2018	Bagani	Ngatngat	Supporting role
2018	Kadenang Ginto	Savannah Rosales	Supporting role / Antagonist
2019	The General's Daughter	2nd Lt. Ma. Lilybeth "Billet" Abarquez	Supporting role
2019	FPJ's Ang Probinsyano	Kagawad Bea Malonzo	Guest role / Protagonist
2020	Eat Bulaga!	Herself	Guest contestant
2020	Tadhana: The One That Ran Away	Hanna	Lead role / Protagonist
2020	Masked Singer Pilipinas	Herself	Judge
2021	Born to Be a Star (season 2)	Herself	Host
2021	Maalaala Mo Kaya	Mary Rose Vargas	Lead role
2023	Drag Race Philippines	Herself	Guest judge
2023	Team A Happy Fam Happy Life	Janet Ambida	Lead role
2023–2024	Eat Bulaga!	Herself	Guest
2024	Rainbow Rumble	Herself	Contestant

== Theatre ==
Year	Title	Role
2013	Disney's Tarzan The Musical	Ensemble
2013	Carrie The Musical	Frieda
2014	Ghost The Musical	Louise
2014–2019	Rak of Aegis	Aileen
2015	Kung Paano Ako Naging Leading Lady	Viva Moran
2015	Manhid: The Superhero Musical	Allunsina Albano
2023	Zsazsa Zaturnnah the Musical... 'Yun Lang!	Zsazsa Zaturnnah

== Discography ==
=== Singles ===
Year	Single
2016	Naluluha Ako
2016	Bongga Ka Day
2017	Sino Ang Iibigin Ko
2019	Jowable
2021	Ang Babaeng Walang Pakiramdam

=== Albums ===
Year	Album	Record label
2015	Kung Paano Ako Naging Leading Lady Original Cast Recording	Viva Records

== Awards and recognitions ==
=== Singer ===
Year	Award giving body	Recognition	Work	Result
2006	ABS-CBN Middle East TFC Pop Star Search			Won
2009	World Championships Of Performing Arts	Senior Grand Champion Vocalist Of The World)		Won
2017	Awit Awards	Best Performance By A Female Recording Artist	"Naluluha Ako"	Won

=== Theatre ===
Year	Association	Category	Nominated work	Production	Result
2014	Gawad Buhay	Best Actress in a Musical	as Aileen	Rak Of Aegis	Won
2015	Gawad Buhay	Best Actress in a Musical	as Allunsina	Manhid	Nominated
2015	Aliw Awards	Best Featured Actress	as Viva Moran	KPANLL	Nominated
2023	Leaf Awards	Best Actress in a Musical	as Zsazsa Zaturnnah	Zsazsa Zaturnnah	Won

=== Actress (Movies/TV) ===
Year	Association	Category	Nominated work	Movie/Show	Result
2015	32nd PMPC Star Awards for Movies	New Movie Actress of The Year	as Luli	style="background: #FFE3E3; color: black; vertical-align: middle; text-align: center; " class="no table-no2 notheme"|Nominated	
2015	41st Metro Manila Film Festival	Best Supporting Actress	as Luli	style="background: #FFE3E3; color: black; vertical-align: middle; text-align: center; " class="no table-no2 notheme"|Nominated	Nominated
2020	51st Guillermo Mendoza Awards 2020 Box Office Entertainment Awards	Most Promising Female Star For Movies	as Elsa	#Jowable	Won
2022	Gawad Urian	Best Actress	as Mylene	Ikaw At Ako At Ang Ending	Nominated

=== Social media ===
Year	Awarding body	Platform	Recognition	Result
2026	Global South World	Instagram	Top 25 Most Influential Comedians in Southeast Asia	Nominated
