= Andre Paras =

Filipino basketball player and actor

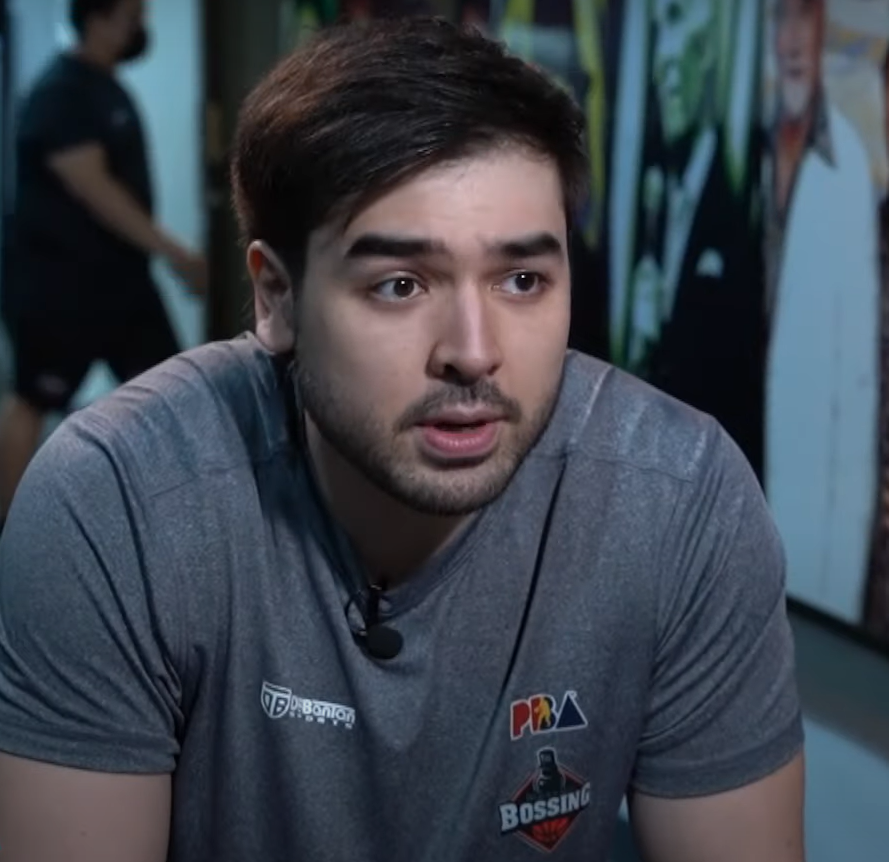
- Paras in 2022
- Born: André Alonzo Forster Paras; November 1, 1995 (age 31); Los Angeles, California, U.S.
- Education: San Beda College
- Occupations: Actor; model; basketball player
- Years active: 2010–present
- Agents: Sparkle (2011–present); Viva Artists Agency (2014–present)
- Known for: Diary ng Panget; The Half Sisters
- Parents: Benjie Paras (father); Jackie Forster (mother)
- Relatives: Kobe Paras (brother)
- Basketball career

Personal information
- Listed height: 6 ft 4 in (1.93 m)
- Listed weight: 217 lb (98 kg)

Career information
- High school: La Salle Green Hills (Mandaluyong)
- College: UP
- PBA draft: 2020: 3rd round, 27th overall pick
- Drafted by: Blackwater Bossing
- Playing career: 2018–2022
- Position: Power forward / center

Career history
- 2018–2019: Imus Bandera
- 2021–2022: Blackwater Bossing

André Alonzo Forster Paras (born November 1, 1995) is a Filipino actor, model, dancer, singer, and former professional basketball player. He is the son of former PBA player Benjie Paras and brother of Kobe Paras. He is the best known for his role as Chad Jimenez in the film adaptation of Diary ng Panget. Paras is most seen in GMA Network and most known for playing the role of Bradley Castillo in the hit melodrama The Half Sisters. After the success of The Half Sisters, Paras and Barbie Forteza paired again in That's My Amboy which aired on 2016.

== Early life and career ==
Paras was born on November 1, 1995, in Los Angeles to PBA legend Benjie Paras and former actress Jackie Forster. He also has a younger brother, Kobe, a basketball player who plays for the Altiri Chiba in the Japanese B.League.

Paras played for La Salle Greenhills in high school. In college, he played for the University of the Philippines (UP) Fighting Maroons like his father. In 2014, Paras transferred from University of the Philippines to San Beda College with the intention of playing for the San Beda Red Lions. After a year of studying in UP and playing as a rookie for the UP Fighting Maroons, he opted to transfer for not being able to balance his studies and acting career due to his hectic work schedule in his drama series The Half Sisters. He also said that although it was his dream to study in UP, he didn't want to have a bad reputation in the university.

Paras then pursued an acting career.

== Professional career ==
=== Imus Bandera (2018–2019) ===
Paras played for the Imus Bandera for the 2018–2019 season of MPBL.

=== Blackwater Bossing (2021–2022) ===
Paras selected 27th overall pick at the PBA season 46 draft. Before the start of the 47th PBA season, he took a leave of absence from Blackwater to pursue acting.

== Career statistics ==
Legend
| GP | Games played | MPG | Minutes per game |
| FG% | Field-goal percentage | 3P% | 3-point field-goal percentage | FT% | Free-throw percentage |
| RPG | Rebounds per game | APG | Assists per game | SPG | Steals per game |
| BPG | Blocks per game | PPG | Points per game | **Bold** | Career high |

=== PBA ===
| Year | Team | GP | MPG | FG% | 3P% | FT% | RPG | APG | SPG | BPG | PPG |
|---|---|---|---|---|---|---|---|---|---|---|---|
| 2021 | Blackwater | 19 | 9.4 | .526 | .083 | — | 1.5 | .2 | .0 | .3 | 2.2 |
| Career | | 19 | 9.4 | .526 | .083 | — | 1.5 | .2 | .0 | .3 | 2.2 |

=== College ===
| Year | Team | GP | MPG | FG% | 3P% | FT% | RPG | APG | SPG | BPG | PPG |
|---|---|---|---|---|---|---|---|---|---|---|---|
| 2013–14 | UP | 8 | 5.3 | .182 | .000 | .000 | 0.6 | .1 | .0 | .4 | .5 |
| Career | | 8 | 5.3 | .182 | .000 | .000 | 0.6 | .1 | .0 | .4 | .5 |

== Showbiz career ==
=== GMA Network ===
Paras debut series became one of his biggest breaks when he appeared in the fantasy-drama series Elena M. Patron's Blusang Itim in a supporting role. He became a GMA Network contract artist in 2011 and a regular performer in Sunday All Stars.

In 2022, Paras resumed his showbiz career with an appearance on the drama-fantasy show, Daig Kayo ng Lola Ko. He also joined the broadcast panel for NCAA Season 98.

=== VIVA Films ===
In 2014, together with co-stars Nadine Lustre, James Reid and Yassi Pressman, Paras starred as Chad Jimenez in the Diary ng Panget, a 2014 Filipino teen romantic comedy film based on the popular best-selling book of the same name written and published on Wattpad by Denny R.

== Filmography ==
=== Film ===
| Year | Title | Role | Notes | Ref. |
|---|---|---|---|---|
| 2014 | Diary ng Panget | Chad Jimenez | Main Cast | |
| 2014 | Overtime | Miguel | Supporting Cast | |
| 2015 | Your Place or Mine? | Seth Borromeo | Main Cast | |
| 2015 | Wang Fam | Duke Wang | Main Cast | |
| 2016 | Girlfriend for Hire | Bryle Stanford | Lead Role | |

=== Television ===
==== TV dramas ====
| Year | Title | Role | Ref. |
|---|---|---|---|
| 2013 | Maynila | Andrei | |
| 2014–16 | The Half Sisters | Bradley Castillo | |
| 2015 | Let the Love Begin | Bradley Castillo | |
| 2016 | That's My Amboy | Bryan Ford | |
| 2016 | Encantadia | Wahid | |
| 2016 | Usapang Real Love: Perfect Fit | Eugene | |
| 2017 | Maynila | Jon Avila (Episode: Perfect Pair with Koreen Medina) | |
| 2017 | Trops | Franco | |
| 2017 | Daig Kayo ng Lola Ko | Various | |
| 2018 | Sirkus | Martel | |
| 2018 | Sherlock Jr. | Elpidio "Pido" Lumabao III | |
| 2018 | Pamilya Roces | Gareth Austria | |
| 2019 | Inagaw na Bituin | Singing Competition Host | |
| 2019 | Love You Two | Adonis | |
| 2020 | Descendants of the Sun | Ralph Vergara | |
| 2022 | Daig Kayo ng Lola Ko | Big Bad Wolf | |
| 2022–24 | Abot-Kamay na Pangarap | Luke Antonio | |
| 2025 | My Father's Wife | Mackie | |
| 2026 | Kamao | Alex Guerrero | |

==== Variety shows ====
| Year | Title | Role | Notes | Ref. |
|---|---|---|---|---|
| 2013–2015 | Sunday All Stars | Himself | Performer | |
| 2016–2019 | Sunday PinaSaya | Himself | Mainstay | |
| 2020; 2021; 2022 | All-Out Sundays | Himself | Guest / Host for Shopee sale events | |

==== Reality show ====
| Year | Title | Role | Notes | Ref. |
|---|---|---|---|---|
| 2018 | The Clash | Himself | Journey host | |
| 2022 | Running Man Philippines | Himself | Guest runner | |

==== Game show ====
| Year | Title | Role | Notes | Ref. |
|---|---|---|---|---|
| 2021 | Game of the Gens | Himself | Host | |

== Awards and nominations ==
| Year | Award | Category | Nominated work | Result | Ref. |
|---|---|---|---|---|---|
| 2016 | 2016 GMMSF Box-Office Entertainment Awards | Most Promising Love Team on TV (with Barbie Forteza) | The Half Sisters | Won | |
| 2015 | 46th Box Office Entertainment Awards | Most Promising Male Star of the Year | Not stated | Won | |
| 2015 | ENPRESS Golden Screen Television Awards | Outstanding Breakthrough Performance by an Actor | The Half Sisters | Won | |
| 2014 | Movie Star Festival Awards | Best New Male Personality | Overtime | Won | |
| 2014 | PMPC Star Awards for TV | Best New Male TV Personality | The Half Sisters | Nominated | |
