= Girlfriend for Hire =

- Official Movie Poster
- Directed by: Vanessa U. de Leon
- Screenplay by: Jose Javier Reyes
- Based on: Girlfriend for Hire by Yam-Yam28
- Produced by: Vic del Rosario Jr.
- Starring: Yassi Pressman; Andre Paras
- Cinematography: Gary L. Gardoce
- Edited by: Vanessa U. de Leon
- Music by: Teresa Barrozo
- Production companies: Viva Films; SM Development Corp. (SMDC)
- Distributed by: Viva Films
- Release date: February 10, 2016
- Running time: 106 minutes
- Country: Philippines
- Languages: Filipino; English
- Box office: ₱83.6 million

Girlfriend For Hire is a 2016 romantic comedy film based on a Wattpad novel of the same name by Yam-Yam28. The film was directed by Vanessa de Leon and topbilled by Yassi Pressman and Andre Paras. Produced and distributed by Viva Films and SM Development Corp. (SMDC), it was released on February 10, 2016 in theaters nationwide.

== Synopsis ==
A rich guy hires an orphaned poor girl to be his pretend girlfriend in order to escape his grandfather’s plan of marrying him off to another woman. In exchange of her service, he gives her a posh condo unit and a big weekly salary but there is a catch: she is not allowed to fall in love with him. Eventually, they start falling for each other and just when everything is going fine, his ex-girlfriend (and first love) resurfaces.

== Cast ==
=== Main cast ===
- Yassi Pressman as Shanaia Nami San Jose
- Andre Paras as Brylle Caleb Stanford

=== Supporting cast ===
- Donnalyn Bartolome as Katie Del Prado
- Shy Carlos as Elida "Ellie" Leiber
- Josh Padilla as Third Adams
- King Certeza as Mervin Steve Folkner
- Clint Bondad as TJ Silvero
- Jovic Monsod as Tommy Lopez
- Ara Mina as Auntie Melba Del Prado
- Abby Bautista as Stacy Del Prado
- Ronaldo Valdez as Bernard "Abuelito" Stanford
- Janna Roque
- Clark Merced
- Via Aurigue
- Jelson Bay

== Production ==
=== Music ===
The soundtrack for the film was released on February 21, 2016. 11 days after the premier night of the movie, Viva Records released a digital version of the Original Soundtrack for "Girlfriend For Hire". The digital copy is currently available on Spotify.

Girlfriend For Hire - Original Movie Soundtrack

Soundtrack album by Various Artists
- Released: February 21, 2016
- Recorded: 2016
- Length: 38:42
- Label: Viva Records

No.	Title	{{{extra_column}}}	Length
1.	"Lift"	RJ Santillan	4:56
2.	"Find Me"	Summer	4:25
3.	"Everyday"	Blaze N' Kane, Kelly Welt	4:18
4.	"Paikot-Ikot"	Schizophrenia, Cholo	3:59
5.	"Hush"	Yassi Pressman	3:20
6.	"Bet Mo Ba"	Kelly Welt	3:11
7.	"Sugar Sugar"	Sugar High	4:07
8.	"Dahil Sa 'Yo"	Yassi Pressman, Andre Paras	3:56
9.	"Seryoso Na 'To"	Yassi Pressman	3:02
10.	"I Think I'm in Love"	Yassi Pressman	3:28
Total length:			38:42

== See also ==
- List of Philippine films based on Wattpad stories
