= Past Tense (2014 film) =

- Directed by: Mae Czarina Cruz-Alviar
- Written by: Melissa Mae Chua; Katherine Labayen; Vanessa R. Valdez
- Based on: An Original Story by Mel Mendoza-del Rosario and Artemio Abad
- Produced by: Charo Santos-Concio; Malou N. Santos
- Starring: Ai-Ai delas Alas; Kim Chiu; Xian Lim
- Cinematography: Rommel Sales
- Edited by: Marya Ignacio
- Music by: Cesar Francis Concio
- Production company: ABS-CBN Film Productions, Inc.
- Distributed by: Star Cinema
- Release dates: 26 November 2014 (Philippines); 5 December 2014 (United States)
- Running time: 121 minutes
- Country: Philippines
- Language: Filipino
- Box office: ₱45 million

Past Tense is a 2014 Philippine romantic comedy-drama film directed by Mae Czarina Cruz-Alviar, produced and distributed by Star Cinema. Starring Comedy Queen Ai-Ai delas Alas Together With Heartrob Loveteam Kim Chiu, and Xian Lim. This is the next film of Kim Chiu and Xian Lim with Director Mae Cruz-Alviar following Bride for Rent in the same year. Released on November 26, 2014, Past Tense is the last Star Cinema film of Ai-Ai Delas Alas before she returned to GMA Network. The last Star Cinema 20th Anniversary offering. The film depicts elements of time travel.

== Plot ==
In 2034, Belle (Ai-Ai delas Alas) is in a deep coma. The nurse played a voice recording of Babs (Xian Lim) retelling about their past. The first time Babs saw Belle (Kim Chiu) he had already chosen her but Belle doesn't like Babs due to him being obese. Until one day they meet again in the coffee shop after she was rejected by her long lost father Senator Perry Tantoco (Johnny Revilla). Babs gave her a slice of cake and they build their friendship together. They became best friends even if Babs has secret feelings with Belle. Until Belle meets Carlos (Daniel Matsunaga) and becomes her boyfriend. Even if Belle and Carlos are together, Babs is still there for Belle until he saw Carlos cheating with his ex Annika (Shy Carlos). She confronts Carlos and he gets angry and walked out from Belle. Belle chased him to apologize until she gets into an accident.

Back in 2034, Belle wakes up from a coma and realizes that everything that she had is already gone. Her beautiful face, her happiness. Papa Time (Benjie Paras) shows to her and offered her a second chance to fix her life. They go back to the past. Papa Time brings Belle to Carlos and she has seen what Carlos did to her. Until Belle meets her younger self on the day when Belle will meet Carlos. Belle introduces herself to younger self as Bhe. She asked Belle to take her to the hospital to avoid meeting Carlos. Bhe succeeded to stop Belle meeting Carlos in the restaurant. Babs came to the hospital and when Bhe will a test Carlos in the hospital and He meets Belle.

Belle was invited to Carlos' bar she can't leave Bhe in the hospital. Babs still wants to support her he offered to look for Bhe so Belle can go to Carlos.

In Carlos' Bar, Belle meets Carlos' friend. Bhe wakes up and asked Babs where's Belle and she panics when she finds out that Belle is with Carlos. Carlos is convincing Martina (Bianca Manalo) to be the endorser of his Vodka. Belle befriended Martina and she asked her to accept Carlos' offer. When Babs and Bhe arrive, they see that Belle is hugging Carlos.

Bhe and Babs are drinking together and they confess their emotions. When Babs is already drunk he said to Bhe that he is in love with Belle.

Bhe takes home a drunk Babs. She is confused that Babs loves her and Papa Time shows up telling her how she will see Babs if her head is always turned to Carlos.

In the Morning, Belle arrives in Babs' house to see him but Babs is still in his room with Bhe. Belle suspected something happened with Babs and Bhe. Bhe blackmails Babs that she will tell that she will tell Belle that he is in love with her, if he doesn't give Bhe a job and allow her to live in his house.

Belle is invited by Carlos to see her again and Bhe is scared to happen what she doesn't want to happen again. Bhe tells Babs that she knows the future and there's a flower surprise of Carlos to Belle. Babs saw it he believes her. Bhe wants Babs to be liked by Belle.

Bhe helps Babs to lose weight to have a Grand Gesture to Belle. Bhe did everything to help Babs.

When Belle is with Carlos she realizes that she and Carlos are not same. She called Babs and she tell everything. She told Babs that they are for each other.

Next day, Babs is preparing everything because he will confess his love for Belle. Bhe wants to stop him because he still not ready enough. When Belle arrives and she is expecting that the surprise is from Carlos. Babs confess his love for Belle but she is expecting from Carlos. Babs was so embarrassed and he run away but he collapsed.

Babs is in sick. Belle blames Bhe because she and Babs have a plan for her. Babs is rejecting Belles call and he is avoiding her until he decided to go to San Francisco to move on from her.

Belle missed Babs very much. One night Belle and Bhe saw Carlos but she was not affected. She is affected from Babs until one day Babs came back with lots of changes. He is already slim.

When Babs came back Belle is hoping to fix everything with Babs. Babs came back just to help them to do their project for Carlos' launch and he will go back to San Francisco to study. Babs is so hard with Belle until they have some moments that feels like they are restoring what they are before.

Belle wakes up beside Babs. They kissed but Babs remember the days when he was rejected and embarrassed by Belle. He tells Belle that he is scared to love her again and they will never restore their friendship anymore. Belle hurts and tells Babs that she don't want him to be a part of her life anymore.

Bhe talks to Babs pretending Belle and begs him to forgive Belle.

Babs goes to Sen. Tantoco office to talk to him. In the launching of Carlos' vodka and also the day of Bhe's deadline and a night when Babs going to leave. Babs and Belle are not talking with each other. Bhe saw Papa Time warning her about her deadline. Bhe tells Belle that they are only one and begs her to make up with Babs. Bhe ask Papa Time for an extension of her last 45 minutes to fix her life but in their rule limited time offer only. She disclosed to Papa Time that Babs will have an accident and she looks for Belle to convince her to stop Babs. Babs left to go back in San Francisco.

Belle saw Martina and greet her and Sen. Tantoco approaches Belle and Bhe comes. He asked Belle's forgiveness for avoiding her and he already accept Belle as his daughter. He told Belle that he was approached by Babs and Bhe convince Belle again. She tells everything to Belle and she asked Bhe how did she know everything and believed her.

They chasing Babs just like they are chasing Carlos before. Babs realizes that he can't leave Belle so he gets back.

Belle and Bhe hits Papa Time and Bhe asked Belle to continue chasing Babs instead of helping him just to avoid the truck that will cause their accident. Bhe helps Papa Time and the truck arrives and realizes that she stopped the accident.

Belle and Babs already see each other and they apologized. They have their happy ending. Papa Time asked Bhe if she is ready to go back to the future but she still watching her happy ending until a truck coming to Belle and Babs.

Back in their future Belle wakes up again from a sleep and she thought that Babs was already dead. But Babs (Richard Yap) arrived and Belle stops from worrying. Babs tells Belle about their accident that Belle pushed Babs to save him and she got hit by the truck and her face did not change but her happy ending with Babs remains. She realizes that she woke up not from a coma but from giving birth for her third child with Babs. The same day they celebrating their wedding anniversary and 27 years of their friendship.

== Cast ==
=== Main cast ===
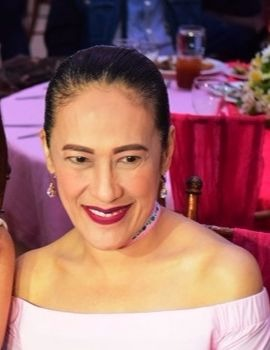
Ai-Ai delas Alas portrays older Rosabelle Garcia-Razon/Belle/Bhe

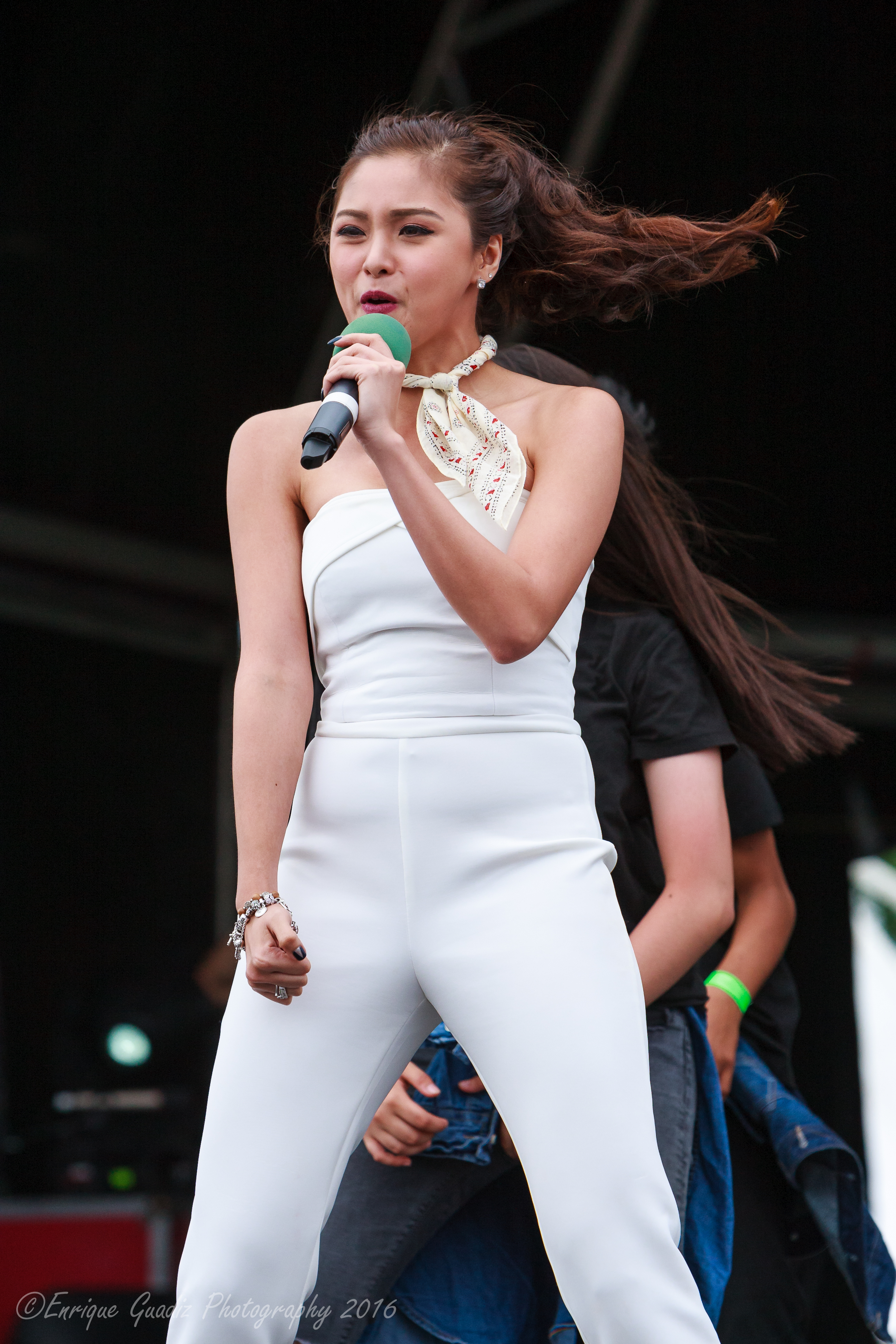
Kim Chiu portrays young Rosabelle "Belle" Garcia

- Ai-Ai delas Alas as older Rosabelle Garcia-Razon/Belle/Bhe
- Kim Chiu as young Rosabelle "Belle" Garcia
- Xian Lim as young Robert "Babs" Razon

=== Supporting cast ===
- Daniel Matsunaga as Carlos Santillan
- Johnny Revilla as Sen. Perry Tantoco
- Melai Cantiveros as Kelly
- RS Francisco as Rick
- Benjie Paras as Papa Time
- Bianca Manalo as Martina
- Anna Luna as Queenie
- Patrick Sugui as Jolo
- Earl Ignacio as Gerry
- Shy Carlos as Annika
- Karen Dematera as Weng Weng
- Tony Mabesa as Lolo Jules
- Ryan Yllana as Nurse (Fatso) / Babs look alike

=== Special participation ===
- Richard Yap as Robert "Babs" Razon (older)

== Music ==
The official theme song of the film is Hey It's Me performed by Juris, originally sung by Jamie Rivera.

== Release ==
Past Tense had its movie premiere on November 25, 2014. In the United States, the film was released by TFC on December 5, 2014.

=== Marketing ===
Star Cinema released the full trailer of Past Tense on November 11, 2014 and it followed by the promotion of the film on ASAP and It's Showtime with Kim Chiu, Xian Lim, and Ai-Ai delas Alas.

== Critical reception ==
Past Tense was Graded B by Cinema Evaluation Board. The film has received some negative critical reception.

Philbert Ortiz Dy of ClickTheCity.com described his feeling watching the film as "like a bunch of stray ideas stuck together". While acknowledging Past Tense as having "some interesting thinking" in it, he wrote that this "was tossed aside" in favor of a basic romcom setup. Past Tense's direction is described by Dy as being bouncy which he says gives energy to the film and acknowledges that the cast gave everything they got. However he describes the core of the film as not very interesting and ugly. He says that film is filled with characters that aren't really worthy rooting for. He says that the characters just do and say terrible things to one another. Dy adds the happiness attained by the characters are the film was earned by the characters who did nothing to earn it although he perceives that the film "convinces" the audience that this happiness means "something".

Oggs Cruz of Rappler wrote that Past Tense was not lacking in ambition but it did waste its ambition. He says that Past Tense followed the "formula" that made Star Cinema a successful film production outfit. He describes the film as a steadfastly a romantic comedy not unlike Jerry Lopez Sineneng's Labs Kita... Okey Ka Lang?, Jose Javier Reyes' Kung Ako Na Lang Sana and Ruel S. Bayani's Paano Na Kaya, where best friends "are put under the threat of a predestined love".
