= Beks Days of Our Lives =

2023 Comedy film directed by Chad Kinis

- Theatrical release poster
- Directed by: Chad Kinis
- Screenplay by: Jonison Fontanos
- Story by: Chad Kinis; Norman Boquiren
- Produced by: Vic Del Rosario Jr.; Rhoenna Deunida; Rowena Niña O. Taduran
- Starring: Lassy Marquez; Mc Muah; Chad Kinis
- Cinematography: Rodolfo Amandy Jr.
- Edited by: Chrisel Galeno-Desuasido
- Music by: Emerzon Texon
- Production companies: Pelikula Indiopendent; Viva Films
- Distributed by: Viva Films
- Release date: May 17, 2023 (Philippines)
- Running time: 105 minutes
- Country: Philippines
- Language: Filipino

Beks Days of Our Lives (also known as Beks: Days of Our Lives) is a 2023 Philippine independent comedy-drama film directed by Chad Kinis in his directorial debut, with a screenplay by Jonison Fontanos, and a story by Kinis and Norman Boquiren. It stars Lassy Marquez, Mc Muah, and Chad Kinis. The film is about three friends having a vacation and talking about their family issues.

== Plot ==
The film follows the enduring friendship of three flamboyant gay men Richard, Melvin, and Reggie who have been inseparable since their elementary school days. Despite pursuing different careers Richard as an insurance broker, Melvin as a tour guide, and Reggie as a cosmetics salesman the trio maintains a weekly bonding ritual and celebrates their "friendsary" annually.

The story takes a poignant turn when Reggie, who has been feeling unwell and struggling with his failing cosmetics business, is diagnosed with leukemia. This revelation devastates the group, prompting them to take a leave from their respective jobs to embark on a road trip to Camarines Sur. Their goal is to create lasting memories and experience what they call the "best days of their lives."

As they journey through the scenic landscapes of Camarines Sur, the trio engages in various adventures that blend humor and introspection, They participate in a local talent show where Lassy humorously portrays a dog.

A visit to a quirky fortune teller leads to amusing predictions, including one where Melvin is told he has met "the man who will take him to heaven." Melvin confronts his estranged father. The lighthearted journey takes a dramatic turn when Reggie suddenly collapses during a dance, leading to a hospital visit that confirms the severity of his condition.

As tensions rise, a devastating secret comes to light, challenging the strength of their friendship. However, the trio ultimately reconciles, reaffirming their bond and the importance of cherishing every moment together.

At the end, a scene set in the afterlife, where the friends reunite, suggesting that their connection transcends even death.

== Cast ==
- Chad Kinis as Richardson
- MC Muah as Melvin
- Lassy Marquez as Reginald "Reggie"
- John Lapus as Mang Romy
- Debbie Garcia as Maybe
- Ruby Ruiz as Lola Ruby
- John Rhey Flores
- Pepita Curtis as Ermitanyo
- Divine Tetay
- Ton Soriano as Host

== Release ==
The film was released in the Philippines on May 17, 2023, by Viva Films. It was released along with Fast X.

== Reception ==
Mario Bautista of Journal News gave the film a positive review and wrote:

The comic gags and jokes used in the movie are a hit or miss thing, but most of the time, they do get to hit it right. With the go-for-broke performances of the three main stars, they do deliver their fair share of laughs.
