= Jacqueline Comes Home =

- Directed by: Ysabelle Peach
- Written by: Carlo J. Caparas; Ysabelle Peach
- Produced by: Vic del Rosario Jr.
- Starring: Meg Imperial; Donnalyn Bartolome
- Cinematography: Gabriel Foulc
- Edited by: Vanessa de Leon
- Music by: Emerzon Texon
- Production company: VIVA Films
- Release date: July 18, 2018
- Running time: 104 minutes
- Country: Philippines
- Language: Filipino

Jacqueline Comes Home is a Filipino crime biographical film starring Meg Imperial and Donnalyn Bartolome playing the roles of Marijoy and Jacqueline Chiong and Ryan Eigenmann as Sonny, the ring leader of the rape and murder. This movie is Alma Moreno's first produced by Viva Films outside of her home studio Regal Films.

The film is about the controversial Chiong murder case. On the night of July 16, 1997, sisters Marijoy (Donnalyn Bartolome) and Jacqueline (Meg Imperial) Chiong were abducted at a mall on Ayala Center Cebu in Cebu City. There, the sisters were gang raped and Marijoy was found dead in a ravine in Carcar, Cebu. However, Jacqueline was never found. The suspects would include Paco Larranaga, who is not portrayed in the film. Rodney Torres did a photo shoot for Meg Imperial and Donnalyn Bartolome for the film in Manila.

== Cast ==
- Meg Imperial as Jacqueline Chiong
- Donnalyn Bartolome as Marijoy Chiong
- Alma Moreno as Thelma Chiong
- Joel Torre as Dionisio Chiong
- Ryan Eigenmann as Sonny (ring leader)
