= P. S. I Love You (TV series) =

- Genre: Romance, drama, soap opera
- Created by: TV5 Network; Viva Television
- Based on: P. S. I Love You (1981) by Eddie Garcia
- Written by: Dino Grece; Andrew Paredes; Ace Ramos
- Directed by: Robert Quebral; Elaine Lozano
- Starring: Gabby Concepcion; Dina Bonnevie; Alex Gonzaga; Kean Cipriano; AJ Muhlach; Nadine Lustre
- Theme music composer: Willie Revillame; Vehnee Saturno
- Opening theme: "I Love You" by Anja Aguilar
- Country of origin: Philippines
- Original language: Filipino
- No. of episodes: 63

Production
- Executive producers: Vicente "Vic" Del Rosario, Jr.
- Producer: Veronique Del Rosario-Corpus
- Running time: 30-45 minutes
- Production company: Viva Television

Original release
- Network: TV5
- Release: November 21, 2011 – February 17, 2012

P. S. I Love You is a Philippine television drama romance series broadcast by TV5. The series is based on a 1981 Philippine film of the same title. Directed by Robert Quebral and Elaine Lozano, it stars Gabby Concepcion, Dina Bonnevie, Alex Gonzaga, Kean Cipriano, AJ Muhlach and Nadine Lustre. It aired from November 21, 2011, to February 17, 2012, replacing Ang Utol Kong Hoodlum and was replaced by Nandito Ako.

It is produced by Vic Del Rosario Jr. and Manuel V. Pangilinan. It marks as the second primetime series produced by Viva Television for TV5 after a decade.

The TV series garnered positive reviews throughout the run for Philippine Entertainment Critics.

== Synopsis ==
Mark's family business suffered from bankruptcy during the time he planned to marry Kristine. Soon after, Kristine accepted the marriage proposal of millionaire Antonio Tuazon. As they part ways, Mark became an investment banker and a self-made billionaire. On the other hand, Kristine became a devoted housewife for her family.

30 years after, Antonio Tuazon was killed and leaves his family's business in bankruptcy. Andrea Tuazon, daughter of Antonio and Kristine, steps up to save their family's assets. As advised to her, Andrea sells their business to Mark Roxas, her mother's one great love.

When Kristine finds this out, she tries everything to prevent Mark from having business transactions with her family. However, Mark's son Paul Stephen develops an intimate relationship with Kristine's youngest daughter Candice. So as the war between the ex-lovers intensifies, the love between their children blossoms.

== Cast ==
=== Main cast ===
- Gabby Concepcion as Mark Roxas - The long lost love affair of Kristine and the father of Paul Stephen.
- Dina Bonnevie as Kristine Tuazon - The long lost love affair of Mark turned to be the wife of Antonio and mother of Andrea and Candice.
- Alex Gonzaga as Andrea Tuazon - The eldest daughter of Antonio and Kristine. She's the one who will suffer all the triumphs of her family after the death of her father.
- Kean Cipriano as Jason Jimenez - A boyband vocalist and boyfriend of Andrea.
- AJ Muhlach as Paul Stephen Roxas - The bratty son of Mark Roxas.
- Nadine Lustre as Candice Tuazon - The youngest daughter of Kristine and Antonio.

=== Supporting cast ===
- Candy Pangilinan as Lovely
- Cheska Iñigo as Patricia
- Melissa Mendez as Stella
- Say Alonzo as Marga
- Cogie Domingo as Donald
- Nikki Bacolod as Shirley
- Jaycee Parker as Amanda
- Michael Flores as Dave
- Al Chris Galura as Mang Teban
- Sarah Polvereni as Layla

=== Extended cast ===
- DJ Durano as Atty. Fontanilla
- Ara Mina as Cassandra
- JC Cuadrado as Spanky
- Joy Viado as Aling Taleng

=== Special participation ===
- Lloyd Samartino as Antonio Tuazon
- Imee Schweighart as young Kristine
- Dino Imperial as young Mark

== Soundtrack ==
The series' official theme song is "I Love You", performed by Anja Aguilar. It was written by Vehnee Saturno, and was originally recorded by Willie Revillame, from his 2011 album, I Love You, a collection of ballads composed entirely by Saturno. Revillame initially performed the song on the January 2010 episode of Wowowee, prior to releasing it on his album the following year.

== See also ==
- List of TV5 (Philippine TV network) original programming
