= Ang Pambansang Third Wheel =

Filipino romance film

- Theatrical release poster
- Directed by: Ivan Andrew Payawal
- Written by: Ivan Andrew Payawal
- Produced by: Vic del Rosario Jr.
- Starring: Sam Milby; Yassi Pressman
- Cinematography: Cesca Lee
- Edited by: Carlo Francisco Manatad
- Music by: Jessie Lasaten
- Production companies: Viva Films; The IdeaFirst Company
- Distributed by: Viva Films
- Release date: 7 March 2018
- Running time: 97 minutes
- Country: Philippines
- Language: Filipino

Ang Pambansang Third Wheel (lit. 'The National Third Wheel')is a 2018 Filipino romantic comedy film written and directed by Ivan Andrew Payawal starring Sam Milby and Yassi Pressman. The film was released in the Philippines on March 7, 2018, in co-production with The IdeaFirst Company.

== Plot ==
Yassi Pressman as Trina is an unlucky girl when it comes to love, she had been hurt by three men as she always ends up being the third wheel in her every relationship. Later on she meets Sam Milby as Neo an impossibly gorgeous and sincere man who manages to break down her walls until she learns that Neo has a son from his previous relationship. Trina's character finds herself the third wheel again but not in the way she expected.

== Cast ==
- Sam Milby as Neo
- Yassi Pressman as Trina
- Al Tantay as Pops
- Alonzo Muhlach as Murphy
- Sam Pinto as Monica
- Francine Prieto as Mary
- Kim Molina as Grace
- Cholo Barretto as Will
- Jourdanne Castillo as Ally
- Bob Jbeili as Noah
- Cindy Miranda as Diane
