= Chain Mail (film) =

- Theatrical movie poster
- Directed by: Adolfo Alix Jr.
- Screenplay by: Adolfo Alix Jr.; Agnes de Guzman; Jerry Gracio; Enrique S. Villasis
- Story by: Adolfo Alix Jr.; Agnes de Guzman
- Produced by: Vic del Rosario Jr.
- Starring: Meg Imperial; Shy Carlos; Nadine Lustre
- Cinematography: Albert Banzon
- Edited by: Lawrence Fajardo
- Music by: Diwa de Leon
- Production company: VIVA Films
- Distributed by: VIVA Films
- Release date: July 22, 2015
- Running time: 90 minutes
- Country: Philippines
- Language: Filipino

Chain Mail is a 2015 Filipino mystery horror film starring Meg Imperial, Shy Carlos and Nadine Lustre. It was released on July 22, 2015, by VIVA Films. It was directed and co-written by Adolfo Alix Jr.

The film earned negative reviews from film critics.

== Plot ==
The movie follows a group of people who receive a chain letter. Some of them forward it along as requested, but some just ignore it. Subsequent events suggest the letter is cursed, resulting in people dying brutal and bloody deaths. Will the dark and black origins behind the cursed letter be unveiled before time runs out to stop the gruesome murders caused by the unknown evil itself?

== Cast ==
Main cast

- Nadine Lustre as Anne
- Meg Imperial as Aileen
- Shy Carlos as Kasandra or Sandra

Supporting cast

- AJ Muhlach as Ryan, Aileen's Boyfriend
- Rose Van Ginkel as Julia/Demon
- Caleb Santos as Jake
- Mark Bautista as Sir Philip
- Perla Bautista as Grandma of Aileen and Sandra
- Jackie Lou Blanco as Tessie, Mother of Aileen and Sandra
- John Regala as Alan, Father of Aileen and Sandra
- Bernardo Bernardo as Amang Frank
- Menggie Cobarrubias as Mr. Mariano
- J. C. Parker
- Janna Roque as Sam
- Prince Stefan as Ryan's older brother
- Josh Padilla as David
- Arkin Del Rosario as Felix
- Carlo Lazerna as
- Issa Pressman as Cynthia
- Chad Kinis as Mr. Nadres
- Kim Molina as Karen
- Clint Bondad as
- Clark Merced as Ed
- Billy Villeta as Alex
- Arvic Rivero as Watashe
- Ryan Kevin
- Jay Roas
- Jessy Salvador
- Matthew Ty
- Philip Olayvar
- Matthew Edwards
- Samantha Capulong as Adrienne
- Jenny Yeo
- Jean Uyking
- Matthew Fajardo
- Asian Institute Of Maritime Studies
- Meliton Villegas
- Berna Cruz
- Joy Dela Fuente
- Leo Lapid
- Ivan Louie Valdovino
- Marvin De La Fuente
- Roy De La Cruz
- Steven Valenzuela
- Mark Narag
- Jay Villasco
- Tin Cruz
- Anna Perlta
- Josh Bernabe
- Justine Vinas
- Gerald Reyes
- Yhancie Padua
- Jerome Barrios
- Regiede Cruz
- Manuel Manahan
- Erika Estrella
- Abegail Sulcipio
- Empress Miranda
- Angel Nola
- Nerisa
- Neil Edilo

== Critical reception ==
Chain Mail received negative reviews from film critics.

Philbert Ortiz from clickthecity.com gave a 2 and a half stars saying " It isn't scary. It isn't affecting. It doesn't even make any sense. Its climax is a genuine mess, the film clearly trying to dig its way out of a bottomless narrative hole, leading to ridiculous sequences that make the characters look like complete morons. It doesn't feel like anyone really wanted to make this film, but it exists because of how the industry is run. It's all about showcasing young stars."

Oggs Cruz from rappler also gave a negative review from the film saying "On paper, Chain Mail is full of promise – but it doesn't really deliver."

== See also ==
- List of Filipino films in 2015
- List of ghost films
