= Friendly Fire (2024 film) =

- Theatrical release poster
- Directed by: Mikhail Red
- Written by: Nikolas Red; Anton Santamaria
- Story by: The Red Brothers
- Produced by: Paul Soriano; Mark Victor
- Starring: Loisa Andalio; Coleen Garcia; Yves Flores; Harvey Bautista; Bob Jbeili
- Cinematography: Ian Alexander Guevara
- Edited by: Nikolas Red
- Music by: Myka Magsaysay; Paul Sigua
- Production company: Ten17P
- Distributed by: Black Cap Pictures
- Release dates: October 5, 2024 (HIFF); October 23, 2024 (Philippines)
- Running time: 105 minutes
- Country: Philippines
- Languages: Filipino; English

Friendly Fire is a 2024 Philippine sports drama film written by Nikolas Red and Anton Santamaria and directed by Mikhail Red. It stars Loisa Andalio, Coleen Garcia, Yves Flores, Harvey Bautista and Bob Jbeili. The film is about an avid gamer, who is trying her level best to make it her profession.

== Plot ==
The film started with a Esports live stream where Adrian joined in the team of DEFCOM.

A breadwinner named Hazel living with her mom and had a brother named Aero who taught her to play Project Xandata and is in jail but scheduled to be free on July 30, 2024. She was working in a computer shop called Clicktopia. One evening together with the kids who's playing in the shop, Hazel was able to defeat two members of Team Isla using her old computer mouse. At that time Sonya (manager of Team Isla) who handle Von and Ryan in Team Isla is looking for another member to fill the slot that Adrian left for them to be able to join in Grand Prix. In a training match sonya and some investor watching the 3 vs 2 match of Team Isla where Von and Ryan was defeated by player named Kaya (Hazel). Sonya meet Hazel in Clicktopia and she tries to recruit her to join Team Isla.

Hazel joined Team Isla and do training session with their coach Kuyan Ong, team captain Von and Ryan. Since she had been playing alone all this while, Hazel had to learn to become a team player, and that was not an easy transition. Hazel had trouble working with the new mouse given to her, and she had to switch to her old computer mouse that she called it 'Mickey Mouse' to be able to function well. In the practice game Hazel was shocked and froze up on learning her brother had joined the game from the computer shop, it was his way of intimidating her. Aero was possessive, and just like his mother, he was not in favor of Hazel continuing her life as a professional gamer. Aero got into trouble after pursuing online gaming and was not keen on Hazel following his footsteps. On meeting Hazel, he was convinced about her gaming abilities and let go of his resentment since she was far more talented than he ever was.

Team Isla faced the foul-mouthed team Mutiny in the qualifiers the Team Isla is having a hard time facing Mutiny specially Hazel because she was distracted by the enemy and pressured at the same time but her brother Aero came to watch the match and support Hazel in a nonchalant way. Hazel smiled and her confidence is back defeating all the enemy and win the match. Before flying to Hong Kong Sonya told hazel to make up to her family before leaving for the Project Xandata Grand Prix. Hazel came home and apologized to her mother and brother for walking out on them. To her surprise, her mother and brother offered their support to her as she was headed to Hong Kong with Team Isla, representing the Philippines for the gaming tournament.

On reaching Hong Kong, Hazel was introduced to a whole new world, yet she was excited since this was her first time. Hazel was comfortable in the environment and was looking forward to meeting Adrian. The night before the tournament began, Hazel, Von, and Ryan ran into Adrian and his team that was representing South Korea on team DEFCOM, and it was not a pleasant meetup. Adrian turned out to be an arrogant person who began to bully Team Isla and tried to manipulate Hazel. Von and Ryan were agitated by their ex-teammate’s conversation, and Von ended up injuring Ryan in that scuffle. Sonya asked them to get their act together before they enter the arena.

As the tournament began, Team Isla quickly became the crowd favorite. All of them were looking forward to the new team member since Adrian’s exit and judging how good Hazel would be. Some of the time Team Isla struggled yet they were able to get past several rounds before reaching the semifinals. Hazel wanted to win this for her brother, since he taught her the game, and with this win, she would be able to change her life for good. As Team Isla began their game for the semifinals, Hazel’s 'Mickey Mouse' malfunctioned it was stop working since she had been using it constantly ever since she joined Team Isla. The semifinal concluded with her mouse working again and Team Isla marched into the finals of Project Xandata Grand Prix.

Before the finals Sonya share some tactics how to defeat Adrian. Sonya had known Adrian long enough to understand his pattern of play, and she used it to her advantage to defeat his team. The final game began with Team Isla on the back foot since Von and Ryan’s characters were killed in the game by Adrian. He wanted to get back at Sonya and her team for not paying him enough for his skills and talent. Adrian was driven by anger, but Hazel was focys and driven by the desire to see her team win. Hazel was in a tough spot, and yet she was able to defeat Adrian and his team in the finals. Team Isla announced as a champion of Project Xandata Grand Prix.

== Cast ==
=== Main Cast ===
- Loisa Andalio as Hazel (In Game Name: Kaya), a new recruit in Team Isla
- Coleen Garcia as Sonya Wilson, Manager of Team Isla
- Yves Flores as Von, The team leader of Team Isla
- Harvey Bautista as Ryan (In Game Name: Sm1le)
- Bob Jbeili as Kuya Ong, The Coach of Team Isla
- Jan Silverio as Adrian Go (In Game Name: Reaper), Ex-Member of Team Isla who transferred to team DEFCOM
- Liza Deño as Hazel's Mother
- Jon Lucas as Aero (In Game Name: 4gotten), Hazel's Brother, who taught Hazel how to play Project Xandata
- Alodia Gosiengfiao as Herself

== Release ==
The film was premiered at Hawaiʻi International Film Festival on October 5, 2024, and theatrically released in the Philippines under Black Cap Pictures on October 23, 2024.

== Reception ==
The movie received a score of 69/100 from 7 reviews according to review aggregator website Kritikultura, indicating positive reviews.

Andrew Heskins of EasternKicks gave the film 3 stars over 5 stars and he wrote; Ultimately, it’s a solid step into the mainstream for Red, and a likeable one at that. But you can’t help but wonder if the use of the real game isn’t part of the issue.

Panos Kotzathanasis of Asian Movie Pulse gave the film a mixed reaction and he said; “Friendly Fire” will definitely find some appeal among Esports and video games fans, and is quite easy to watch. At the same time, it is definitely on a lower level than Red’s previous works.

Carlos Pineda of Sports Interactive Network (Spin.ph) gave the film a mixed to positive review and he wrote; Friendly Fire captures the heart and soul of being in the esports industry, and Mikhail Red deserves a lot of plaudits for the level of detail displayed.

Fred Hawson of ABS-CBN gave the film a rating of 7 out of 10 and wrote; despite the fact that the players were all just sitting on their PCs and clacking on their keyboard and clicking on their mouse, this Mikhail Red film was exciting and fun, with excellent editing and music of its game play, and energetic commenting by the players and announcers.
