= Shy Carlos =

Filipino actress and model

- Born: Schirin Grace Sigrist; March 16, 1995 (age 30); Bern, Switzerland
- Occupations: Actress, VJ, singer
- Years active: 2008–present
- Agent: Viva Artists Agency (2008–present)

Schirin Grace Sigrist (born March 16, 1995), known professionally as Shy Carlos, is a Filipino actress and singer. She is a former member of the all-female group called Pop Girls.

She gained wide recognition for her role as Jackie Reyes in the teen romance film based on the best-selling romantic novel of the same name Para sa Hopeless Romantic (2015) and its sequel Para sa Broken Hearted (2018). She also appeared in such films as Chain Mail (2015), Pagsanib Kay Leah Dela Cruz (2017) and The Barker (2017).

On television, she has played Gayle Fresnido in Bagets: Just Got Lucky (2011–2012), Maria Rosario Jonina "Joni" Quijano in Be Careful with My Heart (2014), Tasya / Princess Anastacia in Tasya Fantasya (2016), Alon in Bagani (2018) and various roles in Maalaala Mo Kaya and Ipaglaban Mo!.

She is also a VJ for the music channel MTV Pinoy.

== Career ==
=== Early work – 2010 ===
Carlos started doing several T.V. commercials at the early age of 4. She then embarked on singing and dancing when she was 10 years old.

In 2008, she was one of the supporting cast in Codename: Asero as Agent Pigtails.

She debuted in the all female group, Pop Girls which was launched by Viva Entertainment in 2009 alongside the Nadine Lustre, Rose Ginkel and twins Lailah and Mariam Bustria. At the time, she was using her former screen name Schai Sigrist.

She eventually left the group to start a career in acting and was temporarily replaced by Carlyn Ocampo and Aubrey Caraan.

=== 2011–2012: Bagets: Just Got Lucky and A Secret Affair ===
She began using the professional name Shy Carlos and made her acting debut in the television remake of the 1984 film Bagets: Just Got Lucky as Gayle Fresnido. She also guested in some episodes of Maynila and Maalaala Mo Kaya, performed on Hey it's Saberdey! and Sunday Funday and later starred in the comedy fantasy series Kapitan Awesome as Dina Lang.

Carlos also made her film debut in the romantic drama film A Secret Affair as May Delgado.

=== 2013–2016: Be Careful with My Heart and Para sa Hopeless Romantic ===
Carlos played Bianca in Annaliza, alongside Khalil Ramos who appeared as her ex-boyfriend. She also appeared in "Wedding Booth" and "Diploma" episodes of Maalaala Mo Kaya and "My Gimik Girl" episode of Maynila. She started appearing in the cable teen gag show Wapak and participated in When the Love is Gone as Chloe.

In 2014, she was cast in Be Careful with My Heart as Joni. On 14 July, she officially debuted as the newest VJ in MTV Pinoy.

She appeared in the teen romance film based on the best-selling romantic novel of the same name Para sa Hopeless Romantic as Jackie Reyes and horror film Chain Mail.

She also played the lead role in the remake of the fantasy-romance drama Tasya Fantasya as Tasya / Prinsesa Anastacia which was played before by Kris Aquino in 1994 and Yasmien Kurdi in 2008.

== Filmography ==
=== Television ===
Year	Title	Role
2008	Codename: Asero	Agent Pigtails
2009–2010	SOP	Herself/Performer
2009–2010	Party Pilipinas	Herself/Performer
2011	Bagets: Just Got Lucky	Gayle Fresnido
2011	Maynila : Her Perfect Match	Bea
2011	Hey it's Saberdey!	Herself/Performer
2012	Maynila : Sweethearts for Life	Paula
2012	Sunday Funday	Herself/Performer
2012	Daily Top Five	Herself/Guest Host
2012	Maynila : Taking Chances	Katy
2012	Kapitan Awesome	Dina Lang
2012	Maynila : Extra Special	Lea
2012	Maynila : Survival ng Puso	Rachel
2012	Startalk	Segment Host
2012	Maalaala Mo Kaya: "Coma"	Ging-ging
2013	Wapak: Winner ang Pakwela at Kulitan	Herself
2013	Maynila : My Gimik Girl	Cien
2013	Maalaala Mo Kaya: "Diploma"	Armida Siguion-Reyna
2013	Walang Tulugan with the Master Showman	Herself
2013	Annaliza	Bianca
2013	Maalaala Mo Kaya: "Wedding Booth"	Dina
2014	Be Careful with My Heart	Joni Quijano
2014	Maalaala Mo Kaya: "Selfie"	Coleen
2015	Pasión de Amor	young Gabriela Salcedo-Elizondo
2015	Maalaala Mo Kaya: "Eye Glasses"	Erica
2016	Tasya Fantasya	Tasya / Princess Anastacia
2016	Happy Truck HAPPinas	Herself / co-host
2017	Maalaala Mo Kaya: Makeup	Iris
2017	Ipaglaban Mo: Abuso	Rina
2017	FPJ's Ang Probinsyano	young Verna Syquia-Tuazon
2017	Ipaglaban Mo: Paratang	Sally
2017	Maalaala Mo Kaya: Sketchpad	
2017	Maalaala Mo Kaya: Kwek Kwek	Mutya
2018	Bagani	Alon

=== Film ===
Year	Title	Role
2012	A Secret Affair	May Delgado
2013	When the Love is Gone	Chloe
2014	Past Tense	Annika
2015	Para sa Hopeless Romantic	Jackie Reyes
2015	Chain Mail	Sandra
2015	All You Need Is Pag-Ibig	Tara
2016	Lumayo Ka Nga sa Akin	Aby Catacutan
2016	Girlfriend for Hire	Elida Leiber
2017	Ang Pagsanib kay Leah Dela Cruz	Leah dela Cruz
2017	Fangirl Fanboy	Cheska
2017	The Barker	Bella
2018	Para sa Broken Hearted	Jackie Reyes

== Discography ==
=== Albums ===
Year	Album	Producer	Notes
2009	Pop Girls	Viva Records	Debut Album with Pop Girls

=== Singles ===
Year	Song	Album	Notes
2010	"Sige Sayaw"	Pop Girls	as a member of Pop Girls
2010	"True Love"	Pop Girls	as a member of Pop Girls
2009	"Crazy Crazy"	Pop Girls	as a member of Pop Girls
2017	"Pag-agos"		Digital single

== Music video appearances ==
Year	Title	Artist
2012	"Sobra Kitang Mahal"	Miguel Aguilar
2013	"Right Next to Me"	Kimpoy Feliciano
2014	"Ready Ka Na Ba"	Kito Romualdez
2015	"You Are Mine"	Caleb Santos
2018	"Lumalapit"	The Juans

== Awards and nominations ==
Year	Title	Award	Category	Result
2013	A Secret Affair	29th PMPC Star Awards for Movies	New Movie Actress of the Year	Nominated
