= Jowable =

2019 comedy film by Darryl Yap

- Directed by: Darryl Yap
- Written by: Darryl Yap
- Produced by: Vincent del Rosario III; Veronique del Rosario-Corpus; Darryl Yap
- Starring: Kim Molina
- Cinematography: Rain Yamson
- Edited by: Vincent Asis
- Music by: Emerzon Texon
- Production companies: Viva Films; VinCentiments
- Distributed by: Viva Films
- Release date: 25 September 2019
- Running time: 83 minutes
- Country: Philippines
- Language: Filipino

Jowable (stylized as #Jowable) is a 2019 Philippine comedy film written, co-produced, and directed by Darryl Yap in his directorial film debut. It starring Kim Molina in the title role.

== Cast ==
=== Main Cast ===
- Kim Molina as Elsa Mangahas
- Kakai Bautista as Liberty Mangahas
- Cai Cortez as Karissa
- Jerald Napoles as Bumbay
- Candy Pangilinan as Sister Katrina
- Suzette Ranillo as Miss Soledad Manalili
- Chad Kinis as Facundo "Facky"
- Fabio Ide as Dmitri
- Debbie Garcia as Cynthia
- Ronnie Liang as Charles
- Jobelyn Manuel as Nuna
- Billy Jake Cortez as Tristan
