= Bagets: Just Got Lucky =

2011–12 Philippine television drama series

- Developed by: TV5 Entertainment
- Written by: Keiko Aquino; Apple Bernardino; Dinno Erece
- Directed by: Mark A. Reyes
- Starring: AJ Muhlach; Josh Padilla; Rico dela Paz; Aki Torio; Johan Laurens; Nadine Lustre; Shy Carlos; Eula Caballero; Meg Imperial; Imee Hart
- Opening theme: "Just Got Lucky" by XLR8 and Pop Girls
- Ending theme: "Growing Up" by Raymond Lauchengco and Baguettes Boys
- Country of origin: Philippines
- Original language: Filipino
- No. of episodes: 40

Production
- Executive producers: Vic del Rosario, Jr.
- Producer: Veronique del Rosario-Corpuz
- Editor: Jay Linao
- Camera setup: Multiple-camera setup
- Running time: 1 hour

Original release
- Network: TV5
- Release: May 15, 2011 – February 12, 2012

Related
- Luv Crazy; Kapitan Awesome

Bagets: Just Got Lucky is a Philippine television drama series broadcast by TV5. The series is based on the 1984 Philippine film Bagets and Bagets 2. Directed by Mark A. Reyes, it stars AJ Muhlach, Josh Padilla, Rico dela Paz, Aki Torio, Johan Laurens, Nadine Lustre, Shy Carlos, Eula Caballero, Meg Imperial, Imee Hart. It aired from May 15, 2011, to February 12, 2012, replacing Luv Crazy and was replaced by Kapitan Awesome.

== Synopsis ==
Bagets centers on a story of young individuals coming from different backgrounds and co-existing in a campus despite their class differences and clashing personalities. These interesting characters include school rivals Ace (AJ Muhlach) and Georgina (Nadine Lustre), who bring out the best and the worst of each other through their competition. Ace is a friendly athletic scholar who is popular in school due to his academic and extra-curricular activities while Georgina is a working student and a campus leader who is not afraid to speak her mind. Meanwhile, competing with Ace for George's attention is a rich kid named Jules (Josh Padilla), who is popular with the girls because of his good looks, charm, and affluence. Jules’ confidence, however, sometimes borders on arrogance.

There is also Gayle (Shy Carlos) who pursues JC (Rico dela Paz); the two will eventually look past their differences to appreciate their individualities. Meanwhile, Santi (Johan Lourens), who comes from an affluent family, is paired with Tara (Eula Caballero), a social climber. When Santi falls in love with Tara, she struggles between maintaining her deception and revealing her true feelings. Finally, the conflict-driven relationship between Hiro (Aki Torio) and Liezl (Meg Imperial) forms a key plotline of the Bagets series.

== Cast ==
=== Main cast ===
The Boys

- AJ Muhlach as Ace Delgado
- Johan Laurens as Santi Pecson
- Rico dela Paz as JC Enriquez
- Aki Torio as Hiro Galura
- Josh Padilla as Jules Soriano

The Girls

- Nadine Lustre as Georgina George Evangelista
- Shy Carlos as Gayle Fresnido
- Eula Caballero as Tara Montes
- Imee Hart as Hannah Fresnido
- Meg Imperial as Liezl Rubio

Campus Bullies

- Martin Velayo as Matthew Matty Pineda (Mama's Boy)
- Julian Calderon as Julian Roxas
- Lucas Zamora as Mac

The Mean Girls

- Mariel Bitanga as Mandy
- Joan Singh as Simone Luis "The IT Girl"
- Coraleen Waddell as Sachi

=== Supporting cast ===
- Raymond Lauchengco as Ariel
- Cheska Iñigo as Santi's mother
- Aifha Medina as Miss KC
- Almira Muhlach as Leizl's mother
- Bernadette Allyson as Ace's mother
- Biboy Ramirez as JC's father
- Candy Pangilinan as Hiro's mother
- Dingdong Avanzado as George's father
- Ella Guevara as Hiro's sister
- Jao Mapa as Jules and Ace's father
- Jef Gaitan as Miss Jelai
- Joy Viado as Principal Subong
- LJ Moreno as JC's mother
- Nikita McElroy as Hiro's sister
- Erika Padilla as Tara's sister
- Dino Imperial as Dustin Herrera
- CJ Jaravata as Gayle and Hannah's mother

== Production ==
In December 2010, Perci Intalan, the creative head for TV5, revealed a remake of Bagets that would be co-produced by Viva Television. TV5 brought in Mark A. Reyes, the director of 90s series T.G.I.S., to direct the remake. TV5 recommended Rico dela Paz and Eula Caballero to join the cast. Viva then recommended AJ Muchlach and Aki Torio, who were also members of the Filipino boy band XLR8. Muhlach is also the brother of Aga Muhlach, one of the stars of the original film. The campus bullies were cast via auditions. Original Bagets members Raymond Lauchengco and Cheska Inigo also joined the remake's cast.

== See also ==
- List of TV5 (Philippine TV network) original programming
