= Chad Kinis =

Filipino actor and comedian

- Born: Richardson de la Cruz; April 22, 1986 (age 40); Lipa, Batangas, Philippines
- Occupation: Actor
- Years active: 2016–present
- Agent: Viva Artists Agency (2019–present)

YouTube information
- Channel: Chad Kinis
- Years active: 2008–present
- Genres: Comedy; parody; vlogging
- Subscribers: 2.18 million
- Views: 184.9 million
- Last updated: 12 August 2024

Richardson de la Cruz (born April 22, 1986), known professionally as Chad Kinis, is a Filipino actor, comedian, and YouTuber. He is an artist under Viva Entertainment Inc.

== Career ==
He first joined It's Showtime's segment "Miss Q and A". Despite not winning the Miss Q and A crown, Chad's appearance in "Miss Q and A" led to his career as a performer as well as a part of the vlogging collective Beks Battalion with MC and Lassy.

On March 6, 2020, he released his debut single "Basta Panget" under Viva Records.

In 2026, he was included on Global South World's list of the “Top 25 Most Influential Comedians on Instagram in Southeast Asia”.

== Personal life ==
In March 2021, Kinis revealed in a vlog that he along with fellow Beks Battalion members tested positive for COVID-19, from which they eventually recovered.

In a 2024 interview with Toni Gonzaga, Kinis revealed that he grew up in a strict household where he experienced homophobic abuse from his father who was not accepting of his orientation.

== Filmography ==
=== Television ===
Year	Title	Role	Ref
2018	It's Showtime	Participant/guest	
2019	Tonight with Boy Abunda	guest	
2019–2020	Magandang Buhay	guest	
2019–2020	Gandang Gabi, Vice!	guest	
2021	1000 Heartbeats: Pintig Pinoy	Co-host	
2021	Puto	Madonna	
2023	The Chosen One: KakataCute	Donald "Donnie / Donna" Ubina Jr.	
2024	LOL: Last One Laughing Philippines	Participant/Winner	

=== Film ===
Year	Title	Role	Ref
2015	Chain Mail	Mr. Nadres	
2018	Abay Babes		
2018	Amnesia Love	Buni	
2019	S.O.N.S: Sons of Nanay Sabel	Tanod 1	
2019	#Jowable	Facundo "Facky"	
2019	M&M: The Mall The Merrier	Lovely	
2020	Love the Way U Lie	Pao	
2020	Mang Kepweng: Ang Lihim ng Bandanang Itim	Deedee	
2021	Tililing	Bernie	
2021	Ang Babaeng Walang Pakiramdam	Eric	
2021	Ang Manananggal na Nahahati ang Puso	Gudong	
2021	House Tour	Louie	
2021	Crush kong Curly	Kip	
2021	A Hard Day	Highway Patrolman	
2022	PaThirsty	Bunny	
2022	5 in 1	Wedding Host	
2022	Suki	Manager	
2023	Beks Days of Our Lives	Richardson	

== Discography ==
Year	Track	Album	Ref
2020	"Basta Panget"	N/A	
