= XLR8 =

Filipino boy band

- Origin: Manila, Philippines
- Genres: P-pop; Dance
- Years active: 2010–2012, 2024–present
- Label: Viva
- Past members: AJ Muhlach; Hideaki Torio; Arkin del Rosario; Caleb Santos; Carlo Lazerna; Kiko Ramos; MJ Magno; MM Magno
- Website: official site

XLR8 was a Filipino boy band under VIVA Records. The group composed of Arkin del Rosario, Carlo Lazerna, the identical twins MJ and MM Magno, Kiko Ramos, Caleb Santos, AJ Muhlach and Hideaki Torio. They were regularly seen on the Sunday noontime variety show Party Pilipinas aired on GMA Network.

== History ==
=== Pre-debut and debut: 2008–2010 ===
Sometime in 2008, Vic Del Rosario of VIVA media franchise decided to form a boyband under his recording company VIVA Records. First to be part of the project boyband was then stage performer Kiko Ramos followed by TV host and commercial model Hideaki Torio, ramp and commercial model Carlo Lazerna and church choir singer Caleb Santos. After a series of training VIVA decided to add one more member; then theater actor and commercial model Arkin del Rosario soon joined the line up. Still unsatisfied, VIVA added two more members who happened to be twin brothers; former Star Magic contract talent Melmar Magno and aspiring singer Meljohn Magno. Several members joined and left but the last to seal the final eight members was commercial model, aspiring actor and VIVA's contract talent AJ Muhlach. All final eight members continued to train together for their singing and dancing skills and then worked on their debut album. The group derived their name from the Ben 10 character XLR8.

The group made their debut on March 28, 2010 on the popular variety show Party Pilipinas with their debut single "You're so Hot", and continued to regularly appear on it. The group then performed at various mall shows and made various concert appearances.

=== Temporary member departure and disbandment ===
In early 2011, Viva Records confirmed that XLR8 members Hideaki Torio and AJ Muhlach would be temporarily leaving the group to film the TV series Bagets: Just Got Lucky which aired on TV5. Because of this, GMA, the channel that broadcast Party Pilipinas, temporarily suspended the two members from performing at any GMA-sponsored events and allowed them to perform at any non-GMA sponsored events. Until the members finished filming the series, substitutes would take their places performing on Party Pilipinas. MM and MJ were later featured on KMJS in 2016.

== Members ==
- AJ Muhlach
- Hideaki Torio
- Arkin del Rosario
- Caleb Santos
- Carlo Lazerna
- Kiko Ramos
- MJ Magno
- MM Magno

== Discography ==
=== Studio album ===
Album Information	Track Listing
XLR8 (Debut album): Released: March, 2010; Label: Viva Records; Language: Filipino, English; Producer(s): Christian de Walden and Marcus Davis; Certification: GOLD	Tracks: 1. You're So Hot; 2. Tonight's The Night; 3. I Wish Lang; 4. Dance with Me; 5. I Love You Girl; 6. I'll Be there 7. She Was Mine; 8. Anyway; 9. Miss Beautiful; 10. Precious Love; 11. For You; 12. Money Money
Note: Track # 4, 5 and 9 are written by MJ Magno.

=== Singles ===
Year	Title	Album
2010	"You're so Hot"	XLR8
2010	"I Love You Girl"	XLR8

=== Music videos ===
Year	Title	Director
2010	"You're so Hot"	Trev Monteros II
2010	"I Love You Girl"	Trev Monteros II

=== Featured XLR8 tracks ===
Featured Track Information	Track	Album
Take Me Out (GMA Network): Date Used: April 26, 2010 to July 2, 2010	"You're so Hot"	XLR8
Working Girls (GMA Films, VIVA Films and Unitel Pictures): Date Used: April 2010	"Dance with Me"	XLR8
Hating Kapatid (VIVA Films): Date Used: July 2010	"Ms. Beautiful"	XLR8
Diz Iz It (GMA Network): Date Used: April 2010	"You're So Hot"	
Note: The table includes tracks from XLR8's album used in various media.

== Awards ==
Year	Award-Giving Body	Category	Work	Result
2011	GMMSF Box-Office Entertainment Awards	Most Promising Recording/Performing Group		Won
2024	P-pop Music Awards	P-POP Frontier		Won
