= Isolated (film) =

2025 Horror film directed by Benedict Mique

- Theatrical release poster
- Directed by: Benedict Mique
- Screenplay by: Benedict Mique; Juvy Galamiton; Shania Vonzel Obena
- Story by: Benedict Mique
- Produced by: Vincent Del Rosario III; Valerie S. Del Rosario; Veronique Del Rosario-Corpus; Benedict Mique
- Starring: Joel Torre; Yassi Pressman
- Cinematography: Eli Balce
- Edited by: Noah Tonga
- Music by: Paulo Protacio
- Production company: Lonewolf Films
- Distributed by: Viva Films
- Release date: April 30, 2025
- Running time: 101 minutes
- Country: Philippines
- Language: Filipino

Isolated is a 2025 Philippine psychological horror thriller film co-produced and directed by Benedict Mique from a story and screenplay he co-wrote with Juvy Galamiton and Shania Vonzel Obena. It stars Joel Torre and Yassi Pressman.

== Synopsis ==
After being overworked and underpaid, Rose resigns from her work in a public hospital. She applies for an online job which offer a higher salary to become a personal nurse and caregiver for Peter, an elderly crippled man with dementia whose house is located in a remote area. Shortly after her arrival, Rose starts having frightening visions and often disturbs by a ghostly disfigured woman who haunts her.

== Cast ==
Main cast

- Joel Torre as Peter Coleman
- Yassi Pressman as Rose Magbanua

Supporting cast

- Candy Pangilinan as Mabeth
- Yayo Aguila as Teresa
- Wilbert Ross as Felix
- Rafa Siguion-Reyna as Police Investigator

Extended cast

- TJ Valderrama as Holdaper
- Denise Esteban as Ann
- Andrea Babierra as Sandra
- Gwen Garci as Peter's Mom
- Keizer Prince as Fern
- Daena Lagdameo as Daisy
- Maru Delgado as Rose's Ex-Boyfriend
- Liz Gonzales as Rose's Ex New Girlfriend
- Zel Fernandez as Female Ghost Victims
- Ruslan Jacob Asumbrado as Young Peter
- Zsazsa Zobel
- Raquel Enriquez
- Jonica Lazo
- Divine Villarreal

== Production ==
In February 2025, the cast and crew are revealed and they started filming in Taguig.

On April 8, 2025, in a media conference, Yassi Pressman said that the film Isolated is her first and last horror film that she is going to make due to her fearfulness and that she's never been a fan of horror films. She also said that the last horror film that she saw was James Wan's 2010 horror film Insidious. She also added that she accepted the offer to do a horror film because she wanted to do a challenging role that would push her on every level.

== Release ==
The film was released on April 30, 2025, under Viva Films and Lonewolf Films.
