= Double-barrelled =

Double-barrelled or double-barreled (with or without hyphens) may refer to:

- Double-barrelled name, a type of surname
- Double-barreled question, an improper formulation of a question
- Double Barrelled Soul, a 1967 album by Brother Jack McDuff and David Newman

== Combination guns ==
- Double-barreled rifle
- Double-barreled shotgun

== See also ==
- Double Barrel (disambiguation)
