= Bob Jbeili =

Filipino actor

- Occupations: Comedian; actor
- Years active: 2012–present
- Agent: Viva Artists Agency

Bob Jbeili is a Filipino comedian and actor under Viva Artists Agency. He is known for his comedic style, film roles, and appearances on television variety shows in the Philippines.

== Career ==
Jbeili first gained public attention in 2012 as a contestant in the Mr. Pogi segment of Eat Bulaga!. In 2015, he joined The Funny One, a comedy competition segment of It’s Showtime.

He has since appeared in several films produced by Viva Films, including The Write Moment (2017), Ang Pambansang Third Wheel (2018), Lucid (2019), and Para sa Broken Hearted (2018). He also starred in VivaMax projects such as the "rantserye" Kung Pwede Lang, where he played Prince, the eldest son of the Dominguiano family.

In 2022, Jbeili appeared in the Vivamax film PaThirsty, a spin-off of the BL series Gameboys. During its promotion, he expressed support for LGBTQIA+ acceptance, stating that individuals should not fear being themselves as long as they do not harm others.

Jbeili is managed by Viva Artists Agency.

== Personal life ==
Jbeili was born to a Lebanese father and a Filipina mother. His father died in 2012. Since joining the entertainment industry in 2014, he has focused solely on his show business career, declining sideline jobs outside acting and comedy.

He has described himself as interested in exploring various forms of comedy, aspiring to star in romantic comedies that combine humor and emotional depth, similar to the works of Adam Sandler.

== Filmography ==
=== Film ===
Key
†	Denotes films that have not yet been released

Year	Title	Role	Ref!
2026	Stuck on You		
2026	Always Yours, Never Mine		
2025	Quezon	Tomas Oppus	
2025	100 Awit Para Kay Stella	Errol Palacio	
2025	Un-Ex You	Greg	
2024	And the Breadwinner Is...	Basketball Player	
2024	My Boyfriend Is a Sex Worker	Azi Wang	
2024	Friendly Fire	Kuya Ong	
2024	Boys at the Back		
2023	Working Boys 2: Choose Your Papa	BJ	
2023	Sa Muli	Jojo	
2022	Us x Her	Rob	
2022	Livescream	Double Sided Coin	
2022	5 in 1	Bodyguard	
2022	The Escort Wife	Waiter	
2022	Expensive Candy	Ben	
2022	PaThirsty	Sean	
2022	Boy Bastos	Layno	
2022	Hugas	James	
2021	Dulo	Ranty	
2021	Sarap Mong Patayin	Emman	
2021	69+1	Quintin	
2019	Lucid	Kulas	
2019	Unforgettable	Je (Chuchay's Friend)	
2019	‘Tol	Nightshift Boy	
2018	Asuang	Conyo Guy	
2018	Para sa Broken Hearted	Fx Driver	
2018	Abay Babes	Police Officer	
2018	Ang Pambansang Third Wheel	Noah	
2017	The Write Moment	Anton	
2017	Happy Breakup	Kenneth	

=== Short films ===
Year	Title
2024	Nightbirds
2019	Excuse Me, Miss, Miss, Miss
2019	Drop Off

=== Television ===
Year	Title	Role
2012	Eat Bulaga!	Himself / Contestant in the segment Mr. Pogi
2015	It's Showtime	Himself / Contestant in the segment Funny One
2019	The Orbiters	Twinkle
2019	Maalaala Mo Kaya	Saudi Arabian Police
2021	Kung Pwede Lang	Prince
2021	Puto	Elong
2021	On the Job	Noel Cabrera
2021	Niña Niño	Julius
2023	Deadly Love	Sgt. Eder
2024	Da Pers Family	Mayor
2024	Beyond the Game	
2024	Barangay Singko Panalo	Host
