= Rak of Aegis =

- Official poster
- Music: Aegis (arrangements by Myke Salomon)
- Lyrics: Aegis
- Book: Liza Magtoto
- Basis: Songs of the Philippine rock band Aegis
- Productions: 2014 PETA (Original Manila Production); 2014–2019 PETA (Reruns, Seasons 2–7); 2021 Online Streaming
- Awards: Philstage Gawad Buhay Awards (11 wins, including Outstanding Original Musical)

Rak of Aegis is a Philippine jukebox musical with a book by Liza Magtoto, featuring the discography of the Filipino pop-rock band Aegis. Directed by Maribel Legarda with musical direction and arrangement by Myke Salomon, the musical was produced by the Philippine Educational Theater Association (PETA). The story is set in the fictional, perennially flooded urban poor community of Barangay Villa Venizia and explores themes of Filipino resilience, poverty, climate change, and the pursuit of fame in the digital age.

Since its premiere on January 31, 2014, Rak of Aegis became one of the most successful and longest-running contemporary theatrical productions in the Philippines, spanning seven seasons and over 300 performances until 2019.

== Synopsis ==
The musical is set in Barangay Villa Venizia, a subdivision that has been submerged in floodwaters for months. The story centers on Aileen, a young promodizer with exceptional vocal talent who dreams of becoming a viral YouTube sensation to be discovered by Ellen DeGeneres. She hopes that international fame will provide her family with a ticket out of poverty and bring attention to her flooded community.

While Aileen focuses on her ambitions, her father, Kiel, faces losing his job as the local barangay captain, Mary Jane, considers closing her struggling shoe factory due to the flood's economic impact. Aileen's romantic life is also complicated by the affections of two suitors: Kenny, Mary Jane's son who wishes to pursue art instead of taking over the shoe business, and Tolits, a street-smart boatman who eventually helps Aileen upload her singing video online.

When Aileen's video goes viral, Villa Venizia suddenly becomes a tourist attraction. The community attempts to capitalize on the disaster by selling flood gear and offering gondola-style boat rides, leading to a moral conflict about profiting from their own tragedy. Ultimately, the residents must unite to address the root cause of the flooding and find sustainable ways to rebuild their lives.

== Background and production ==
The concept for Rak of Aegis originally began as an inside joke. During the Philippine staging of the Broadway musical Rock of Ages, musical director Myke Salomon pitched the pun "Rak of Aegis" to PETA Artistic Director Maribel Legarda. Recognizing the cultural impact and theatrical potential of Aegis' "karaoke-favorite" rock ballads, Legarda officially pitched the project to PETA.

Playwright Liza Magtoto was brought on board to write the libretto. She structured the narrative around the aftermath of recent tropical cyclones in the Philippines, specifically drawing inspiration from the devastation of Typhoon Ondoy (2009) and Typhoon Yolanda (2013). Magtoto integrated the band's repertoire—widely known as "sawi" (heartbreak) songs—into the context of urban struggle, communal conflict, and hope.

The stage design by Mio Infante famously featured a functional, flooded set. To ensure the safety of the cast and audience, the onstage floodwater was treated with chlorine, and the theater was regularly maintained with scent-free insecticides and citronella to prevent mosquito infestations.

After its initial 36-show run in early 2014 sold out completely, PETA extended and restaged the musical repeatedly. By its seventh season in 2019, the production had introduced various rotating cast members, including prominent mainstream media actors and music industry veterans. In 2021, amidst the COVID-19 pandemic, PETA streamed a recorded performance of the musical online as part of its "#TakePETAbeyondCOVID" fundraising campaign.

== Cast and characters ==
Due to the musical's longevity and demanding vocal requirements, multiple actors alternated in the principal roles throughout its seven-season run.

Character	Description	Notable Cast Members
Aileen	A young promodizer with a powerful singing voice who dreams of viral fame.	Aicelle Santos, Kim Molina, Tanya Manalang
Kiel	Aileen's hardworking father and an employee at the local shoe factory.	Robert Seña, Noel Cabangon, Oj Mariano
Mary Jane	The Barangay Captain and owner of the struggling shoe factory.	Isay Alvarez, Carla Guevara Laforteza
Tolits	A local boatman and Aileen's devoted suitor.	Pepe Herrera, Jerald Napoles
Kenny	Mary Jane's son, a frustrated artist, and Aileen's other suitor.	Myke Salomon, Poppert Bernadas
Jewel	A flamboyant aspiring shoe designer and Aileen's confidant.	Phi Palmos, Jimmy Marquez

== Musical numbers ==
The musical features a score entirely composed of hit songs by Aegis. Musical director Myke Salomon heavily rearranged the tracks to fit the narrative structure of musical theater while retaining their rock elements. Featured songs include:

- "Halik"
- "Luha"
- "Basang-basa sa Ulan"
- "Sinta"
- "Sayang na Sayang"
- "Christmas Bonus"

== Themes ==
Rak of Aegis serves as a social commentary on the conditions of the urban poor in the Philippines. The continuous flooding in Villa Venizia acts as an allegory for disaster capitalism, governmental neglect, and the broader impacts of climate change. The musical also explores the "Filipino resilience" trope; while it celebrates the community's ability to smile and adapt through calamities, it critically questions whether resilience is merely an excuse for accepting systemic failures and "eating fire and drinking water" rather than demanding structural change.

== Reception and awards ==
The musical was a massive critical and commercial success, frequently selling out its eight-show-a-week schedules. Critics praised Salomon's musical arrangements, Legarda's staging, and the ensemble's vocal performances.

At the 2014 Philstage Gawad Buhay Awards, the most prestigious award-giving body for Philippine theater, Rak of Aegis dominated the ceremony by winning 11 of its 17 nominations.

Selected Gawad Buhay Wins:

- Outstanding Original Musical
- Outstanding Stage Direction for a Musical (Maribel Legarda)
- Outstanding Original Libretto (Liza Magtoto)
- Outstanding Musical Direction (Myke Salomon)
- Female Lead Performance in a Musical (Kim Molina)
- Male Featured Performance in a Musical (Pepe Herrera)
- Outstanding Ensemble Performance for a Musical
- Outstanding Set Design (Mio Infante)
- Outstanding Sound Design (Myke Salomon and Happy Constantino)
- Outstanding Costume Design (Carlo Pagunaling)
- Outstanding Choreography for a Play or Musical (Gio Gahol)
