= Kapitan Awesome =

2012–13 Philippine television fantasy comedy drama series

- Genre: Comedy, fantasy
- Created by: Associated Broadcasting Company
- Written by: Nathaniel Arciga
- Directed by: Joyce Bernal
- Starring: Martin Escudero; Empoy Marquez; Andrew E.
- Country of origin: Philippines
- Original languages: Filipino; English
- No. of seasons: 3
- No. of episodes: 64

Production
- Executive producer: Racquel Dacanay
- Editor: Joel Romares
- Running time: 60 minutes

Original release
- Network: TV5
- Release: February 19, 2012 – May 5, 2013

Related
- Bagets: Just Got Lucky

Kapitan Awesome (lit. Captain Awesome) is the first comedy fantasy afternoon series to be aired on TV5 from February 19, 2012, to May 5, 2013, replacing Bagets: Just Got Lucky. Lead actors are Andrew E., Martin Escudero and Empoy Marquez.

== Synopsis ==
Efren lives a simple life with his father Adonis, who owns a Siomai shop. But, he doesn't know, that Adonis had invented a power siomai for Efren, and when he eats it, he becomes an ugly but 80's looking superhero known as Kapitan Awesome.

== Cast and characters ==
=== Main cast ===
- Martin Escudero as Efren
- Empoy Marquez as Kapitan Awesome
- Andrew E. as Adonis
- Alwyn Uytingco as Baste/Kapitan Perfect
- Aki Torio as Jacky
- Alchris Galura as Waway
- Stephanie Sol as Lana Hiya
- Shy Carlos as Dina Lang
- Ritz Azul as Love
- Morissette Amon as Mhay Sayad
- Janvier Daily as Ador
- Manny Castañeda as Fairy Godmother, Leader of Planet Perfect
- Edwin Serrano as Alien Moreno / Agent Moreno / Master of Disguise
- Claire Ruiz as Venus
- Jasper Visaya as Paeng

== See also ==
- List of programs aired by TV5 (Philippine TV network)
