= My Zombabe =

2024 Philippine film

- Theatrical release poster showing the original release date
- Directed by: Bobby Bonifacio Jr.
- Screenplay by: Juvy Galamiton; Bobby Bonifacio Jr.
- Produced by: Vincent Del Rosario III; Veronique Del Rosario-Corpus
- Starring: Empoy Marquez; Kim Molina
- Cinematography: Rommel Sales
- Edited by: Noah Tonga
- Music by: Emerzon Texon
- Production companies: Viva Films; VinCentiments; Studio Viva
- Distributed by: Viva Films
- Release date: January 10, 2024
- Running time: 105 minutes
- Country: Philippines
- Language: Filipino
- Box office: ₱500,000

My Zombabe (stylized as MY ZOMBabe) is a 2024 Philippine zombie romantic comedy film directed by Bobby Bonifacio Jr., who co-wrote it with Juvy Galamiton. It stars Empoy Marquez and Kim Molina. The film follows a man who falls in love with a woman who is turning into a zombie. Filming began in 2020 but was delayed by the COVID-19 pandemic, and the film was released by Viva Films on January 10, 2024.

== Plot ==
Pong dreams of Yasmine, a zombie woman, running through the woods. He calls out to her, but wakes just as she is about to turn toward him. His brother Gohan calms him down and reminds him that Yasmine has been gone for a long time. Pong admits he still misses her, and Gohan says he cannot move on because he keeps her photo under his pillow. When Gohan tries to tear it up, Pong stops him, and Gohan finds many more photos of Yasmine hidden inside the pillow. A siren sounds, signaling the village's morning Zumba routine, and Gohan tells Pong to stop daydreaming or they will be late.

The brothers hurry to join the others. As the villagers dance, the Captain tells everyone to watch the person beside them, because anyone who is infected will forget the steps. Ahmed, the village's star dancer, looks pale and begins to forget the routine. His wife, Marisol, claims they stayed up late celebrating their anniversary, and Gusting suggests Ahmed is simply tired from the daily routine. The Captain tests Ahmed by stepping hard on his foot and asking if he feels any pain, then makes him close his eyes, pulls his head close and breaks wind in his face. When Ahmed cannot describe the smell, the Captain aims his gun at him. Marisol embraces her husband and begins singing their favorite song, hoping he will join in, while Pong, Gohan and the other villagers watch in tears. As Ahmed tries to sing, he turns into a zombie, and the villagers flee in panic. Pong and Gohan run home, and from inside they hear two gunshots.

That night, Pong and Gohan join the villagers on the beach for a prayer service. While playing the guitar, Pong daydreams that he and Yasmine are about to kiss, and then sees the real Yasmine, who has already become a zombie. Both scream, and Pong pushes her away. When the Captain asks what happened, Pong claims he was bitten by an ant. After the Captain leaves, Gohan worries that Pong has been bitten by a zombie. Pong asks him to help dig in the sand, where they find Yasmine unconscious. They carry her home, and their struggle to hide her from the Captain begins.

== Cast ==
- Empoy Marquez as Pong
- Kim Molina as Yasmine / Jasmine Alcantara
- Yanyan De Jesus as Gohan
- Anjo Yllana as the Captain
- Andrea Del Rosario as Marisol
- Gary Lim as Gusting
- Andrew Muhlach
- Billy Villeta
- Liz Alindogan
- Shirley Fuentes
- Marnie Lapuz
- Mark Gabrador
- William Noyer

== Production ==
Development of My Zombabe began in 2018. Filming began in 2020 but was delayed by the COVID-19 pandemic.

== Release ==
My Zombabe was released in theaters by Viva Films on January 10, 2024. It was originally scheduled for January 8 but was moved back two days because of the extended run of the 2023 Metro Manila Film Festival.

== Reception ==
On the review aggregator Kritikultura, the film has an average score of 67 out of 100 based on 10 critic reviews.

Film critic Philbert Dy, writing on Letterboxd, gave the film three stars. He called it "still pretty clunky, with scenes that go on for far too long, and a resolution that is just another example of the film's apparent disdain for narrative and logical consistency", but added that "it lands on something sweet and unusual; arriving at a conclusion that feels kind of unique in our cinema."
