= AJ Muhlach =

Filipino actor and singer

- Occupations: Singer; dancer; actor
- Years active: 2010–present
- Label: Viva Artists Agency (2017–present)

AJ Muhlach is a Filipino pop singer, actor, and a member of the boy band XLR8. He starred in the Philippine television drama P.S. I Love You in 2011, and Bagets on TV5. Before appearing on Bagets Muhlach was part of the P-pop group XLR8, which performed on Party Pilipinas in GMA Network. He is currently part of Viva Artists Agency.

== Career ==
Sometime in 2008, Vic Del Rosario of VIVA media franchise decided to form a boyband under his recording company VIVA Records, which became known as XLR8. Several members joined and left but the last to seal the final eight members was commercial model, aspiring actor and VIVA's contract talent Muhlach.

In early 2011, Viva Records confirmed that XLR8 members Hideaki Torio and Muhlach would be temporarily leaving the group to film the new TV series Bagets: Just Got Lucky which aired on TV5. Because of this, GMA, the channel that is responsible for broadcasting Party Pilipinas, had temporarily suspended the two members from performing at any GMA-sponsored events and allowed them to perform at any non-GMA sponsored events. Until the members finished filming the series, substitutes would be taking their places performing on Party Pilipinas. MM and MJ were later featured on KMJS in 2016.

In 2017 Muhlach received his biggest acting break when he was cast as the lead role in the action movie Double Barrel.

== Personal life ==
Muhlach is the half-brother of actor Aga Muhlach, and the first cousin of Niño Muhlach, also an actor. His father is Alvaro Muhlach (1947–2018). He married his girlfriend Anna Mabasa on May 20, 2019.

== Filmography ==
=== Television ===
Year	Title	Role
2010–2012	Party Pilipinas	Himself, performer, member of XLR8
2011	P. S. I Love You	Paul Stephen Roxas
2011	Bagets Just Got Lucky	Ace Delgado
2012	Sunday Funday	Himself
2012	Hey, It's Saberday!	Himself
2013–2014	Be Careful with My Heart	Amiel Sebastian
2015	Maalaala Mo Kaya: Cellphone	Jeff
2015	Maalaala Mo Kaya: Sulat	Episode Guest
2015	Maalaala Mo Kaya: Spaghetti	Rudy
2015	Maalaala Mo Kaya: Box	Direk
2015	Wattpad Presents: Bebeng Pabebe Meets Super Jiro	Jiro Palicpic/Super Jiro
2016	Carlo J. Caparas' Tasya Fantasya	Paeng
2016	Maalaala Mo Kaya: Pole	Patrick
2017	FPJ's Ang Probinsyano	Simon "Paniki" Yumul
2017	La Luna Sangre	Levi Esguerra
2017	Tabi Po	Elias
2018	The Blood Sisters	Rainier Lacuesta†
2018	Ipaglaban Mo!: Hayok	Mike Abella
2019	Wansapanataym: Mr. Cutepido	Josh
2019	Ipaglaban Mo: Hawa	Mark Zamora
2019	Ipaglaban Mo: Malasakit	PO1 Eli Terante
2020	Ipaglaban Mo: Kutob	Leonard Corcuera
2020	Ang Daigdig Ko'y Ikaw	Ned Almazan
2021	Ikaw Ay Akin	
2022	Love Bosleng and Tali	Jojo

=== Films ===
Year	Title	Role
2014	Diary ng Panget	Ian Del Rosario
2014	Talk Back and You're Dead	Lee Perez
2015	Para sa Hopeless Romantic	RJ Bustamante
2015	Chain Mail	Ryan
2015	Felix Manalo	Eraño G. Manalo
2016	Camp Sawi	Randolf
2017	Double Barrel	Jeff
2018	BuyBust	Gelo Elia
2019	Eerie	
2019	Ulan	Mark
