= Tasya Fantasya (2008 TV series) =

2008 Philippine television drama series

- Title card
- Genre: Drama; Romantic fantasy
- Based on: Tasya Fantasya (1994) by Carlo J. Caparas
- Directed by: Mac Alejandre
- Starring: Yasmien Kurdi
- Theme music composer: Tata Betita
- Country of origin: Philippines
- Original language: Tagalog
- No. of episodes: 15

Production
- Executive producer: Mona Coles-Mayuga
- Production locations: Metro Manila, Philippines
- Camera setup: Multiple-camera setup
- Running time: 30 minutes
- Production company: GMA Entertainment TV

Original release
- Network: GMA Network
- Release: April 6 – July 13, 2008

Related
- Tasya Fantasya (2016)

Tasya Fantasya (transl. Tasya fantasy) is a 2008 Philippine television drama fantasy romance series broadcast by GMA Network. The series is based on a 1994 Philippine film of the same title. Directed by Mac Alejandre, it stars Yasmien Kurdi in the title role. It premiered on April 6, 2008. The series concluded on July 13, 2008, with a total of 15 episodes.

The series is streaming online on YouTube.

== Premise ==
Tasya, a sales assistant in an optical shop, who willfully yearns for her Prince Charming’s affection. But she quickly finds out that her fate is entangled with that of a magical pair of eyeglasses that will lead her to a series of colorful adventures.

Tasya was orphaned at a very young age and adopted by her abusive Aunt Kelay. But Tasya, being the simple and benevolent person that she is, ignores her aunt's awfulness.

She escapes from her unpleasant world in her dreams and fantasies of spending romantic moments with her Prince Charming, Donald, the optical shop's handsome model; and so her best friend Mateng, who patiently listens to her fantasies, dubs her Tasya Fantasya.

== Cast and characters ==
Cast

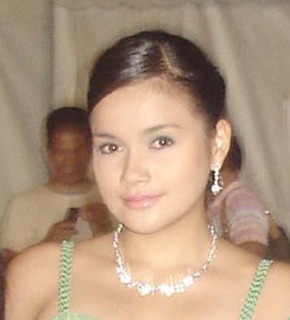
Yasmien Kurdi

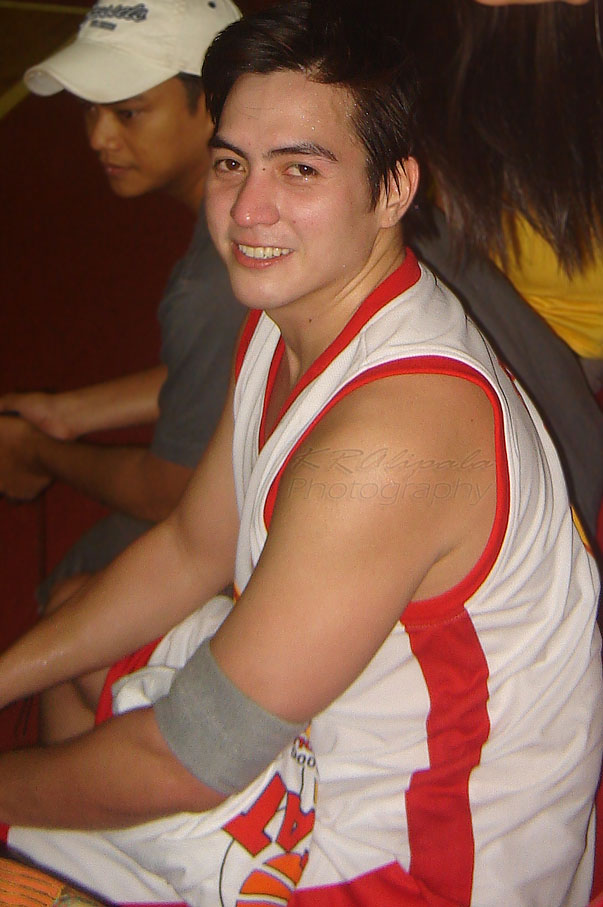
Wendell Ramos

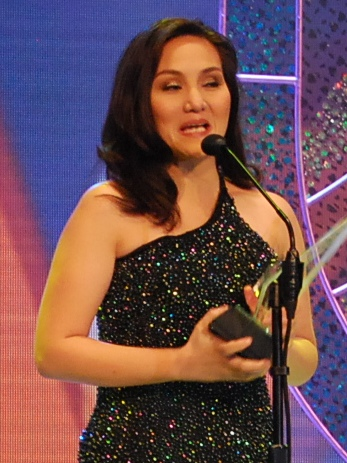
Gladys Reyes

Lead cast

- Yasmien Kurdi as Tasya / Anastacia

Supporting cast

- Wendell Ramos as Donald / Federico
- Rainier Castillo as Raz
- Gladys Reyes as Mateng
- Alicia Mayer as Brigida / Virtuosa
- Mura as Pookalakala
- Vangie Labalan as Kelay

== Ratings ==
According to AGB Nielsen Philippines' Mega Manila household television ratings, the pilot episode of Tasya Fantasya earned a 15.7% rating. The final episode scored a 9.5% rating.

== Accolades ==
Accolades received by Tasya Fantasya
Year	Award	Category	Recipient	Result	Ref.
2008	22nd PMPC Star Awards for Television	Best Horror-Fantasy Program	Tasya Fantasya	Nominated	
