= Philippine criminal law =

Philippine criminal laws is the body of law which defines crimes, and prescribes the penalties thereof in the Philippines.

== History ==
When the Spanish colonizers conquered the Philippines, the Spanish Código Penal was made applicable and extended to the Philippines by Royal Decree of 1870. This was replaced with the old Penal Code which was put in place by Spanish authorities, and took effect in the Philippines on July 14, 1876. This law was effective in the Philippines until the American colonization of the Philippines. It was only on December 8, 1930, when it was amended, under Act. No. 3815, with the enactment of the Revised Penal Code of the Philippines (the “Revised Penal Code”).

== The Revised Penal Code ==
The Revised Penal Code took effect on January 1, 1932. It is composed of two parts – Book One of the Revised Penal Code provides the general provisions on the application of the law, and the general principles of criminal law. It defines felonies and circumstances which affect criminal liability, justifying circumstances and circumstances which exempt, mitigate or aggravate criminal liability, and defines the classification, duration, and effects of criminal penalties. Finally, it provides for the extinction and survival of criminal and civil liabilities in crimes.

Book Two of the Revised Penal Code on the other hand defines the specific crimes and the penalties imposable for each crime. Crimes are classified into crimes against national security (such as treason, espionage and piracy), crimes against the fundamental laws of the state (rebellion, coup d'état, sedition and public disorders), crimes against public interest (counterfeiting of currency, falsification of public documents), crimes against public morals, crimes committed by public officers, crimes against persons (parricide, murder, physical injuries, rape), crimes against security (kidnapping), and crimes against property (robbery, theft), among others. Criminal negligence is also an offense under the Revised Penal Code. Under the Revised Penal Code, acts and omissions punishable by law are called felonies. Thus, to be considered as a felony there must be an act or omission.

=== Degree of consummation of crimes ===
Felonies can be consummated, frustrated, and attempted. A felony is consummated when all the elements necessary for its execution and accomplishment are present. It is frustrated when the offender performs all the acts of execution which would produce the felony as a consequence but which, nevertheless, do not produce it by reason of causes independent of the will of the perpetrator. There is an attempt when the offender commences the commission of a felony directly or overt acts, and does not perform all the acts of execution which should produce the felony by reason of some cause or accident other than his own spontaneous desistance.

Conspiracy exists when two or more persons come to an agreement concerning the commission of a felony and decide to commit it. Conspiracy can also be proven based on the idea of "unity of purpose" and acts leading to a common design. There is proposal when the person who has decided to commit a felony proposes its execution to some other person or persons. Conspiracy and proposal to commit a felony are generally not punishable, except for conspiracy and proposal to commit treason, coup d'état, and rebellion. While not generally punishable, conspiracy can determine the degree of participation in criminal offenses in order to determine criminal liability.

=== Circumstances that affect criminal liability ===
The presence of certain circumstances have the effect of removing, mitigating or aggravating criminal liability of persons. Persons who commit crimes when justifying circumstances are present do not incur criminal or civil liability. Acting in self-defense is one of these justifying circumstances.

The presence of exempting circumstances on the other hand will exempt the perpetrator from criminal liability but not from civil liability. Some of these exempting circumstances are imbecility or youth. On the other hand, the presence of one or more mitigating circumstances when a crime is committed, can serve to reduce the penalty imposed. An example is voluntary surrender.

Lastly, the presence of aggravating circumstances will increase the penalty imposed under the crime, upon conviction. Some examples are contempt or insult to public authority.

=== Participation in crimes ===
Under the Revised Penal Code, when more than one person participated in the commission of the crime, the law looks into their participation because in punishing offenders, the Revised Penal Code classifies them as principals, accomplices, or accessories. A person can be liable as a principal for (a) taking a direct part in the execution of the felony, (b) directly forcing or inducing others to commit it, or (c) cooperate in the commission of the offense by another act without which it would not have been accomplished. Accomplices are persons who, while not acting as a principal, cooperate in the execution of the offense by previous or simultaneous acts.

Lastly, accessories are those who, having knowledge of the commission of the crime, and without having participated therein, either as principals or accomplices, take part subsequent to its commission by: (a) profiting themselves or assisting the offender to profit by the effects of the crime, (b) concealing or destroying the body of the crime, or the effects or instruments thereof, in order to prevent its discovery, or (c) harboring, concealing, or assisting in the escape of the principals of the crime.

Principals are punished more severely than accomplices, who are punished more severely than accessories. However, when there is conspiracy, there will no longer be a distinction as to whether a person acted as a principal, accomplice or accessory, because when there is conspiracy, the criminal liability of all will be the same, because the act of one is the act of all.

=== Murder ===
Article 248 of the Revised Penal Code defines murder as killing someone other than a family member with any of the following six circumstances:

1. With treachery [see below], taking advantage of superior strength, with the aid of armed men, or employing means to weaken the defense, or of means or persons to insure or afford impunity;
2. In consideration of a price, reward, or promise;
3. By means of inundation, fire, poison, explosion, shipwreck, stranding of a vessel, derailment or assault upon a railroad, fall of an airship, by means of motor vehicles, or with the use of any other means involving great waste and ruin;
4. On occasion of any calamities enumerated in the preceding paragraph, or of an earthquake, eruption of a volcano, destructive cyclone, epidemic, or any other public calamity;
5. With evident premeditation;
6. With cruelty, by deliberately and inhumanly augmenting the suffering of the victim, or outraging or scoffing at his person or corps.

Murder is punishable by reclusión perpetua (20 to 40 years' incarceration). Without any of these six aggravating circumstances, a killing is instead homicide punishable by reclusión temporal. A murder is committed “with treachery” by

employing means, methods, or forms in the execution, which tend directly and specially to insure its execution, without risk to the offender arising from the defense which the offended party might make. The essence of treachery is that the attack comes without a warning and in a swift, deliberate, and unexpected manner, affording the hapless, unarmed, and unsuspecting victim no chance to resist or escape. For treachery to be considered, two elements must concur: (1) the employment of means of execution that gives the persons attacked no opportunity to defend themselves or retaliate; and (2) the means of execution were deliberately or consciously adopted.

== Special Penal Laws ==
Apart from the crimes penalized in the Revised Penal Code, several other pieces of criminal legislation have been passed, penalizing acts such as illegal possession and trafficking of dangerous drugs, money laundering, and illegal possession of firearms. These laws are called “Special Penal Laws” and they form part of Philippine criminal laws. There are certain differences between crimes punished under the Revised Penal Code and Special Penal Laws.

Violations of the crimes listed in the Revised Penal Code are referred to as mala in se, which literally means, that the act is inherently evil or bad or wrongful in itself. On the other hand, violations of Special Penal Laws are generally referred to as malum prohibitum or an act that is wrong because it is prohibited. Thus, no criminal intent is needed in order to find a person liable for crimes punished under Special Penal Laws. As long as the act is committed, then it is punishable as a crime under law.

Not all violations of Special Penal Laws are mala prohibita. While intentional felonies are always mala in se, it does not follow that prohibited acts done in violation of special laws are always mala prohibita.

There are some important distinctions between crimes punishable under the Revised Penal Code and Special Penal Laws. One of them is that in crimes punished under the Revised Penal Code, the moral trait of the offender is considered. This is why liability would only arise when there is criminal intent or negligence in the commission of the punishable act. In crimes punished under Special Penal Laws, the moral trait of the offender is not considered; it is enough that the prohibited act was voluntarily done.
