= Double Barrel (2017 film) =

Philippine action film

- Directed by: Toto Natividad
- Screenplay by: Willy Laconsay
- Story by: Toto Natividad; Willy Laconsay
- Produced by: Vincent del Rosario III; Veronique del Rosario-Corpus
- Starring: AJ Muhlach; Phoebe Walker; Jeric Raval
- Cinematography: Elmer Despa
- Edited by: Charliebebs Gohetia
- Music by: Edwin Ortega
- Production company: Viva Films
- Distributed by: Viva Films
- Release date: August 9, 2017
- Running time: 90 minutes
- Country: Philippines
- Language: Filipino

Double Barrel is a 2017 Philippine action film co-written and directed by Toto Natividad. The film stars AJ Muhlach, Phoebe Walker and Jeric Raval.

== Cast ==
- AJ Muhlach as Jeff
- Phoebe Walker as Martha
- Jeric Raval as Insp. Bagani
- Ali Khatibi as SPO4 Lagman
- Oliver Aquino as Pancho
- Caleb Santos as policeman
- Carlo Lazerna as policeman
- Ronald Moreno as policeman
- Dindo Arroyo as gunman
- Mon Confiado as gunman
- Richard Manabat as policeman
- Leon Miguel as gunman
- Joseph Ison as gunman
- Giovanni Baldisseri as gunman
- Jon Romano as drug lord
- Lubel Fernandez as wife of drug lord
- Silay Tan as wife of tokhang victim
- Angel Ortiz as son of Jeff and Martha
