= Tasya Fantasya (2016 TV series) =

- Title card
- Also known as: Carlo J. Caparas' Tasya Fantasya
- Genre: Comedy; Drama; Fantasy
- Created by: Viva Entertainment
- Based on: Tasya Fantasya (1994) by Carlo J. Caparas
- Developed by: Veronique del Rosario-Corpuz; Jay Montelibano
- Directed by: Ricky Rivero
- Starring: Shy Carlos; AJ Muhlach; Mark Neumann
- Opening theme: Dyosa by Shy Carlos
- Composer: Yumi Lacsamana
- Country of origin: Philippines
- Original languages: Filipino, English
- No. of episodes: 13

Production
- Production locations: Quezon City, Philippines
- Camera setup: Multiple-Camera Setup
- Running time: 30-45 minutes
- Production company: Viva Television

Original release
- Network: TV5
- Release: February 6 – April 30, 2016

Related
- Tasya Fantasya (1994); Tasya Fantasya (2008)

Tasya Fantasya is a 2016 weekly Philippine drama-fantasy-comedy series broadcast by TV5. The series is based on the 1994 Philippine film and 2008 television drama of the same title aired on GMA Network. Directed by Ricky Rivero, starring Shy Carlos, AJ Muhlach and Mark Neumann. It aired from February 6 to April 30, 2016.

== Cast ==
=== Main cast ===
- Shy Carlos as Tasya / Princess Anastacia
- AJ Muhlach as Paeng
- Mark Neumann as Noel

=== Supporting cast ===
- Ara Mina as Yvonne
- Kim Molina as Jala
- Candy Pangilinan as Benita
- Freddie Webb as Atty. Enriquez
- Donnalyn Bartolome as Tasya's Friend
- Malak So Shdifat as Leina
- Jasmine Hollingworth as Ynez
- John Lapus as Cadio
- Giselle Sanchez as Carning
- Arvic Rivero as Ymer
- Francine Garcia as Tasya's Friend
- Jordan Castillo as Lucky

=== Guest cast ===
- Jaycee Parker as Tina Luna
- Christopher Roxas as Col. Luna
- Bekimon as Yves
- Nina Ricci Alagao as Dolce
- Mel Kimura as Mama Helen
- Alonzo Muhlach as Ali
- Niño Muhlach as Nyrus

== See also ==
- List of programs broadcast by TV5 (Philippine TV network)
