= Meg Imperial =

Filipino actress

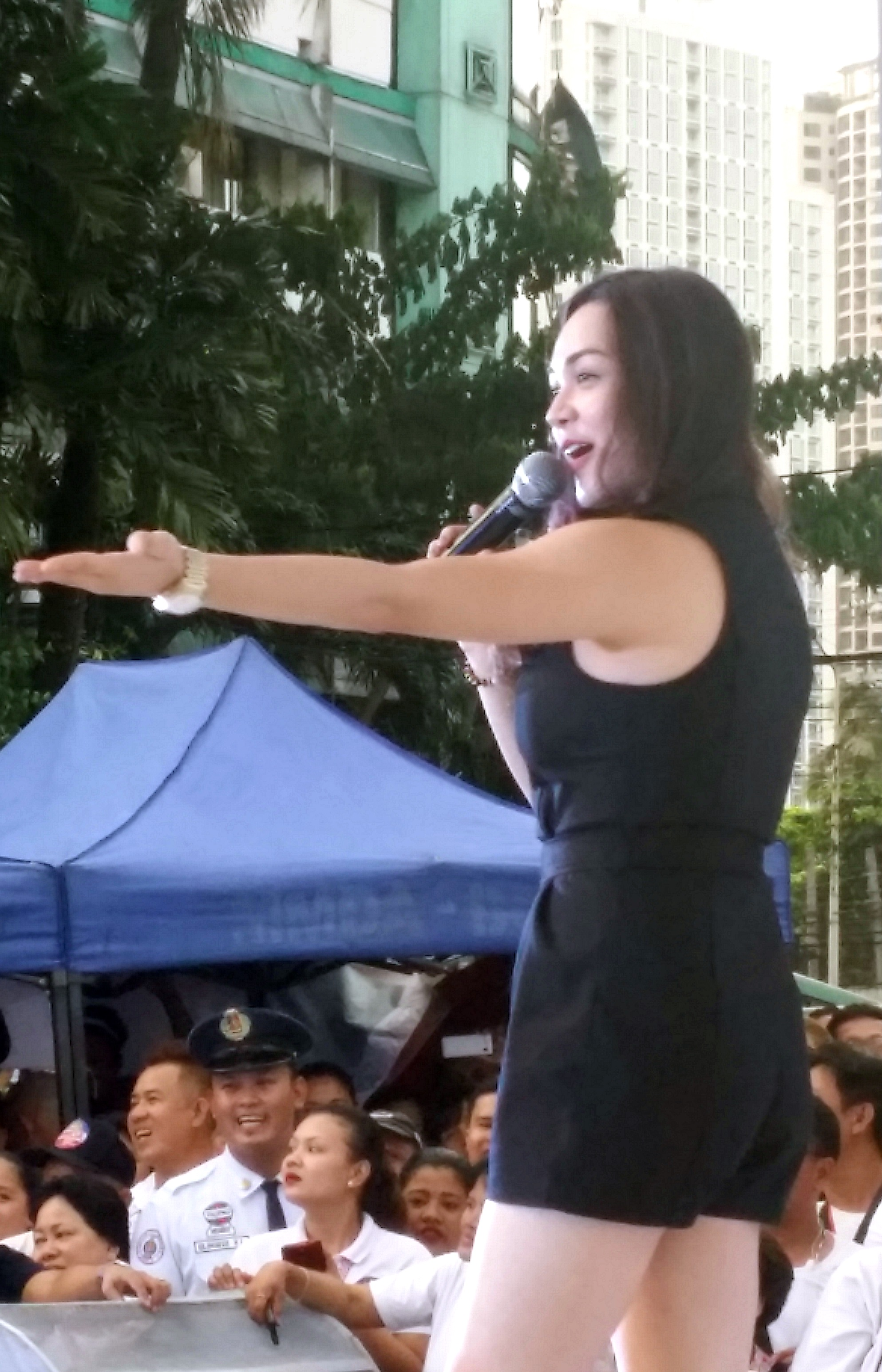
- Meg Imperial performing at MMDA Anniversary in 2016
- Born: Mary Grace Baydal Imperial; January 20, 1993 (age 33); Taytay, Rizal, Philippines
- Occupations: Actress; dancer; singer; model
- Years active: 2009–present
- Agents: Star Magic; Viva Artists Agency; Sparkle GMA Artist Center
- Height: 5 ft 3 in (1.60 m)

Mary Grace "Meg" Baydal Imperial (born January 20, 1993) is a Filipino actress, dancer, singer, and model. She was known as QT in Midnight DJ when she firstly appeared in televisions in 2009, a defunct horror show of TV5. She was previously a Star Magic artist before transferring networks and is currently under Viva Artists Agency.

In December 2012, she was chosen to be the cover girl of FHM Philippines. From 2013 to 2014, she appeared in two afternoon TV series; an antagonist in Galema: Anak ni Zuma, followed by her first leading role as Ayla, "DJ Lav" who has hypertrichosis in Moon of Desire. The biggest break in her acting career was in the hit afternoon series, D' Originals in 2017.

In 2018, Meg played another lead role in the film, Jacqueline Comes Home. Rodney Torres did a photo shoot for Meg for the film.

== Filmography ==
=== Film ===
Year	Title	Role
2013	Menor de Edad	Jen
2014	ABNKKBSNPLAko?! The Movie	Portia
2015	Ex with Benefits	Scarlet
2015	Chain Mail	Aileen
2015	Nilalang	Jane
2017	Higanti	Jean
2017	Kamandag ng Droga	Ginger
2018	Jacqueline Comes Home (The Chiong Story)	Jacqueline Chiong
2018	Abay Babes	Jade
2019	Unforgettable	Violet
2021	Steal	Hiyasmin
2021	Sana All	Iyam
2022	The Last Five Years	
2023	Kahit Maputi Na ang Buhok Ko	
2023	Adik sa 'Yo	
2023	Sa Kamay ng Diyos	Winderlyn Amit

=== Television ===
Year	Title	Role
2009–2011	Midnight DJ	Queenie "QT" Tolentino
2010–2011	My Driver Sweet Lover	Millet
2011	Rod Santiago's The Sisters	Young Socorro Santiago
2011–2012	Bagets: Just Got Lucky	Liezl Rubio
2011–2012	Glamorosa	Adriana Marciano / Adriana Evangelista
2012–2013	Enchanted Garden	Gigi
2013	TodaMax	Gem
2013	Be Careful With My Heart	Sarah
2013–2014	Jim Fernandez's Galema: Anak ni Zuma	Gina Castillo
2014	Moon of Desire	Ayla "DJ Lav" Ricafrente-Bustamante
2014	Ipaglaban Mo: Kasal Ka Sa Akin	Lala
2015	Showbiz Unlimited	Herself
2015	Real Talk	Herself
2015	Kapamilya, Deal or No Deal	Herself - Lucky Stars (No. 11)
2015	Maalaala Mo Kaya: Rosas	young Charito Tiquia
2016	Danny Zialcita's Bakit Manipis ang Ulap?	Alexandra "Alex" Villafuerte
2016	FPJ's Ang Probinsyano	Maribel "Marie" Alegre
2017	Road Trip	Herself / Guest
2017	D' Originals	Alice Lucero / Alice Perez
2017	Karelasyon: Finale	Margaret
2017	Wish Ko Lang	Rhissa Mistula
2017	Wagas: Gayuma ni Kumare	Luzia
2017	Wagas: A Marawi Soldier's Love Story	Liezel
2017	Imbestigador: "Mag-iina"	Jonnalyn
2017	Maynila: House Husband (The Jeric and Marry Ann Silva Story)	Marry Ann Silva
2017	Tadhana: "Pinay for Sale"	Abbie Cruz
2017–2018	Super Ma'am	Ma'am Jessica Montesa
2018	Wish Ko Lang: Bisyo Ang Ibigin Ka	Jocelyn
2018	Wish Ko Lang: Pinatay Ko Ang Kapatid Ko	Rowena
2018	Wagas: Walk With Me	Connie
2018	Maynila: "House Husband	Mary Ann Silva
2019	The General's Daughter	young Corazon de Leon
2019	Imbestigador: Kalaguyo	Rosana Junio
2019	Tadhana: Inabandona	Lani
2019	Maalaala Mo Kaya: Steak	Emmylou Go
2019	Ipaglaban Mo: Hawa	Abi
2019	The Gift	Lizette
2019	Ipaglaban Mo: Alegasyon	Lexa
2020	Imbestigador: 8 Babae AT 1 Lalaki mula Davao, biktima ng human trafficking sa isang BAR sa Isabela!	Lovely
2020	24/7	Mia's mother
2021	Ikaw Ay Akin	Athena Miranda
2023	Good Will	Tricia

=== Music video ===
Title	Singer	Release date
"Isang Umaga"	Shehyee	September 25, 2014

Preceded by Ritz Azul	FHM Cover Girl (December 2012)	Succeeded by Marian Rivera
