= Yassi Pressman =

Filipina actress, television personality, singer, and dancer (born 1995)

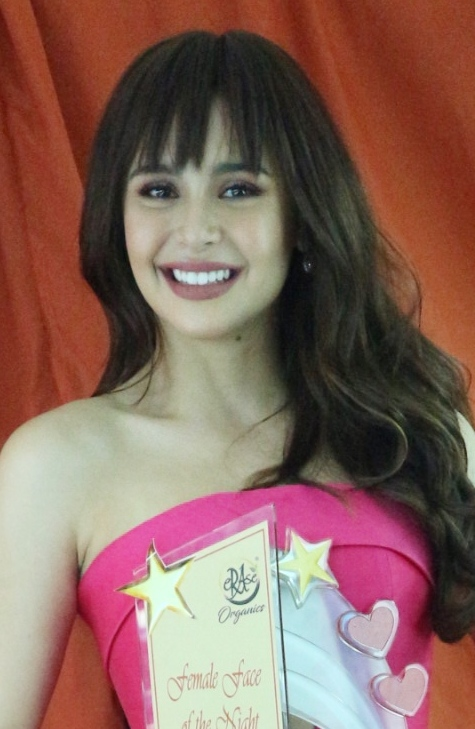
- Yassi at the 2018 PMPC Star Awards for Television
- Born: Yasmin Isabel Pressman; 11 May 1995 (age 31); British Hong Kong
- Occupations: Actress; dancer; singer; VJ
- Years active: 2001–present
- Agents: Star Magic (2006–2009); Sparkle (2009–2015; 2023–2025); Viva Artists Agency (2013–present); TV5 (2015–2016, 2021)
- Musical career
- Genre: Pop
- Label: Viva Records

Yasmin Isabel Pressman (born 11 May 1995) is a Filipino actress, television personality, singer, and dancer. She rose to prominence after portraying Alyana Arevalo in the television series FPJ's Ang Probinsyano (2016–2021).

== Early life ==
Pressman was born in British Hong Kong to a British father and a Filipino mother from Isabela. Her second name, Isabel, is a reference to her mother's home province. Pressman has four sisters: Abby, Cara, Siobhan and Issa.

== Career ==
Pressman is best known for her breakthrough role in Ang Probinsyano as Alyana R. Arevalo-Dalisay, she is known in the Philippine show business as a versatile actress, singer and dancer. Pressman regularly appears in TV series, variety shows, local blockbuster movies and multiple product endorsement advertisements.

She started appearing in TV commercials at the age of 6, her first being Colgate in 2001. In 2006, she was cast in the ABS-CBN drama series Gulong ng Palad as the young Luisa. In 2009, she became a regular GMA Network talent as one of the female dancers of SOP. She was dubbed as the "Princess of the Dance Floor" of Party Pilipinas. When SOP was replaced by Party Pilipinas, Pressman became a part of Sayaw Pilipinas.

In 2013, she signed a co-management contract with Viva Artists Agency. Pressman was also one of the top VJs at MTV and appeared in many online shorts.

In 2014, she was cast as Lorraine "Lory" Keet in the film Diary ng Panget with Andre Paras as her on-screen partner. Pressman also starred as Audrey Dela Cruz in the film Talk Back, and You're Dead with Nadine Lustre and James Reid.

In 2016, Pressman transferred to ABS-CBN as a housemate in Pinoy Big Brother: Lucky 7. She also became a regular performer in ASAP and joined the longest running teleserye on Philippine television, the teleserye adaptation of FPJ's Ang Probinsyano.

== Personal life ==
On February 6, 2020, Her father, Ronnie, died at the age of 90 due to various complications from old age.

In July 2022, Pressman confirmed her relationship with businessman Jon Semira. They ended relationship on August 16, 2023.

In September 2023, Pressman started a relationship with politician Luigi Villafuerte. They engaged on July 18, 2026.

=== Philanthropy ===
Pressman holds multiple charity projects every time she celebrates birthdays and holidays. Since 2023, Pressman returned to GMA Network.

== Filmography ==
=== Film ===
Year	Title	Role
2011	Tween Academy: Class of 2012	Caitlin
2012	Si Agimat, si Enteng Kabisote at si Ako	Sol / Winged Horse
2013	Kaleidoscope World	Elsa
2014	Diary ng Panget	Lorraine "Lory" Keet
2014	Talk Back and You're Dead	Audrey dela Cruz
2015	Felix Manalo	Via Dela Vega
2015	Wang Fam	Elenita Sera
2016	Miracles Are Forever (To Love And To Live)	Leonor
2016	Girlfriend for Hire	Nami San Jose
2016	Camp Sawi	Jessica "Jess"
2018	Ang Pambansang Third Wheel	Trina
2018	Para Sa Broken Hearted	Shalee
2018	Born Ready	Leona
2019	The Mall, The Merrier	Maria Clara / M.C. (Special Participation)
2021	Jesus Christ...Virgin People!	Elizabeth "Liza" Mercado
2021	More Than Blue	Cream
2021	Mang Jose	Gabriela Maginaw
2023	Video City: Be Kind, Please Rewind	Kylie "Ningning" Eusebio
2024	The Guardian	Sandara
2025	Isolated	Rose Magbanua

=== Television / digital series ===
Year	Title	Role
2006	Gulong ng Palad	Young Luisa
2009	Adik Sa'Yo	Lucinda Bartolome
2009–10	Sana Ngayong Pasko	Valeria
2009–10	SOP	Herself / Co-Host / Performer
2010–13	Party Pilipinas	Herself / Co-Host / Performer
2010	Ilumina	Ayra
2010	I Laugh Sabado	Herself / Guest
2011	Time of My Life	Terry
2011–2012	Tween Hearts	Eunice Fuentabella
2012	Luna Blanca	Kate
2012	Makapiling Kang Muli	Vanessa
2012–2013	Cielo de Angelina	Rhoda
2013	Magpakailanman: The Louise delos Reyes Story	Yuri
2013	Dormitoryo	Sophie
2013	Anna Karenina	Jenna Vera
2013	Genesis	Rina Romualdez / Pyra
2013–2015	Sunday All Stars	Herself / Co-Host / Performer
2014	Paraiso Ko'y Ikaw	Young Yvette
2014	Magpakailanman: One Last Chance	Mitch
2014	Hiram na Alaala	Wendy
2015	Wattpad Presents: Mr. Popular meets Ms. Nobody: Still In Love (Part 2)	Mandy Aguilar
2015	Wattpad Presents: My Fiancé Since Birth	Alexandra "Alex" Sanchez
2015	Princess in the Palace	Perla
2015	ASAP	Herself / Performer
2016	Born to Be a Star	Herself / Host
2016	Pinoy Big Brother: Lucky 7	Herself / Celebrity housemate
2016–2021	FPJ's Ang Probinsyano	Alyana Arevalo-Dalisay
2022	Rolling In It Philippines	Herself / Host
2023	Kurdapya	Daphne Santillan / Kuring Bolocboloc
2023	ASAP Natin 'To	Herself / Guest
2023	24 Oras	Herself / Chika in a Minute / Segment Host
2023	TiktoClock	Herself / Co-Host / Performer
2023	All Out Sundays	Herself / Performer / Guest
2023–2024	Black Rider	Vanessa "Bane" Bartolome / Vanessa Romero
2024	Forever Young	
2024–2025	It's Showtime	Herself / Performer / Guest
2025–2026	Roja	Ayen Padua
2026	Tubig to Handle: What the Fun!	Host
2026	The Loyalty Game	Mara Lacaba

== Discography ==
=== Albums ===
List of albums, with selected details
Title	Album details
Yassi	Released: September 9, 2015; Label: Viva Records, Hyphen

=== Singles ===
List of singles, with selected details
Title	Year	Album
"Edge of the World" (with Josh Padilla)	2015	Philpop 2015
"Hush" (featuring Nadine Lustre)	2015	Yassi
"Lala"	2015	Yassi
"Dahil Sa 'Yo" (with Andre Paras)	2015	Yassi and Girlfriend For Hire OST
"'Di Ko Alam" (with Andre Paras)	2015	Yassi and Diary ng Panget The Movie OST
"Katakot-Takot" (with Andre Paras and Alonzo Mulach)	2015	Wang Fam
"Dumadagundong"	2016	Philpop 2016
"Sandaang Habambuhay"	2017	Non-album single
"Migraine"	2018	Non-album single
"Sa Wakas"	2019	Non-album single
"Sige Na Please"	2019	Non-album single
"Basta Kasama Kita"	2019	Non-album single
"Bukas Mo Na Sabihin"	2020	Non-album single
"Kaya Natin Ito"	2020	Non-album single

== Publications ==
Publications
Year	Release	Publisher	Notes
2019	Say Yass To Happiness	Viva Books	Debut book

== Awards and recognitions ==
Pressman has been recognized multiple times by the most prestigious and honourable award giving body in the Philippines. She has won three Guillermo Mendoza Memorial Awards for Best TV Supporting TV Actress for three straight years (2018-2020).

Year	Award/Critics	Category	Result
2013	Metro Manila Film Festival	Kaleidoscope World – Official Entry	Nominated
2014	Star Cinema Awards	Favorite Movie Best Friend	Won
2014	FHM Philippines	100 Sexiest Woman	Rank # 78
2015	FHM Philippines	100 Sexiest Woman	Rank # 57
2015	PhilPop Awards	Best Music Video – "Edge of the World" (Yassi Pressman and Josh Padilla)	Won
2016	Anak TV Awards	Makabata Star	Won
2016	29th Awit Awards	Best Dance Recording for "LALA"	Won
2016	PMPC Star Awards	Female Star of the Night	Won
2016	Push Awards	Popular Dance Cover for "Work"	Won
2016	Yes! Magazine	100 Most Beautiful Stars	Included
	Star Awards for Music 2016	Best New Female Recording Artist of the Year	Nominated
2017	Zalora Style Awards	Most Stylish Female	Nominated
2017	48th Box Office Entertainment Awards	Most Promising TV Actress of the Year	Won
2017	FHM Philippines	100 Sexiest Women	Rank # 27
2017	Yes! Magazine	100 Most Beautiful Stars	Included
2017	Push Awards	Push Dance Cover with Issa Pressman	Won
2017	7th EdukCircle Awards	Best Actress – Television Series	Nominated
2017	31st PMPC Star Awards for Television	Best Drama Supporting Actress	Nominated
2017	30th Awit Awards	Best Dance Recording for "Dumadagundong"	Won
2017	AnakTV Awards 2017	Credible, Wholesome and Worth Emulating by the Youth	Won
2018	32nd PMPC Star Awards for Television	Best Drama Supporting Actress	Nominated
2019	33rd PMPC Star Awards for Television	Best Drama Supporting Actress	Nominated
2020	Guillermo Mendoza Memorial Awards	Best TV Supporting Actress	Won
