= Bodjie Pascua =

Filipino actor

- Born: Luisito Fernandez-Pascua; 2 March 1955 (age 71); Manila, Philippines
- Occupation: Actor / Teacher
- Years active: 1974–present
- Known for: Kuya Bodjie of Batibot
- Spouse: Avic Ilagan (m. 2019)

Luisito "Bodjie" Fernandez-Pascua (born March 2, 1955) is a Filipino stage and film & TV actor and former children's television host. He is best known as "Kuya Bodjie" ("Big Brother Bodjie"), the iconic character he portrayed on the children's educational television program Batibot.

Pascua's stage appearances include Cabaret, Fire, Water, Woman, Mass, 1896, Zarzuela, Battalia Royale, and Hamlet, as well as numerous musicals written by composer Ryan Cayabyab such as Noli Me Tángere.

His film appearances include: Imahenasyon, Sa Aking Pagkakagising Mula Sa Kamulatan, The Blossoming of Maximo Oliveros (local title "Ang Pagdadalaga Ni Maximo Oliveros"), and the satiric mockumentary Coup B'Etat.

== Batibot ==
Pascua is best known as "Kuya Bodjie" ("Big Brother Bodjie"), the iconic character he portrayed on the children's educational television program Batibot.

On Batibot, Kuya Bodjie interacted with the other Batibot characters as part of the show's regular portion. Pascua's unique claim to fame, however, was a segment called "Mga Kwento ni Kuya Bodjie" ("Kuya Bodjie's stories") which featured Pascua telling a new short Children's story in every episode. Pascua called on his theater skills to make the narration lively and to give each character in the stories their own unique voice.

The iconic status of the Kuya Bodjie character has linked him and his distinctive voice to the childhood memories of the generation of Filipino children who grew up during the late 1980s. Jokes and anecdotes about that period often involve a reference to the character, with the speaker imitating Pascua's signature vocalization, or that of other Batibot characters, such as Kiko Matsing or Pong Pagong, speaking to their "Kuya Bodjie".

== Filmography ==
=== Television ===
- Batibot
- Batang Batibot
- GMA Telecine Specials
- Love Notes
- It Might Be You
- Gimik
- Pahina
- Epol/Apple
- Sineskwela
- Wansapanataym
- Art Angel - guest
- Maynila
- Magpakailanman
- Maalaala Mo Kaya: Kwintas
- Star Confessions
- Precious Hearts Romance Presents: Bud Brothers
- Your Song Presents: Million Miles Away
- I Dare You
- My Beloved
- Broken Vow
- Precious Hearts Romances Presents: Paraiso
- Be Careful With My Heart
- The Ryzza Mae Show- guest
- Agos
- Moon of Desire
- Kuwentong K-buhayan
- Elemento
- Nathaniel
- Wattpad Presents
- Oh My G!
- Tunay na Buhay
- Sabado Badoo
- Ang Panday
- Tsuperhero
- Wildflower
- Daig Kayo ng Lola Ko
- Tadhana
- Starla
- 24/7
- 2 Good 2 Be True
- Mga Kwentong Epik
- Love You Stranger
- Mano Po Legacy: The Flower Sisters (2022)
- The Iron Heart (2023)
- Roadkillers (Amazon Prime Video, 2023)
- Can’t Buy Me Love (2023)
- Black Rider (2023)
- Pinoy Crime Stories: Mastermind (2024)
- Lilet Matias: Attorney-at-Law (2024)
- Pamilya Sagrado (2024)
- It’s Okay to Not Be Okay (2025)
- Mga Batang Riles (2025)
- Regal Studio Presents: Lolo Clickbait (2025)
- Blood vs Duty (2026)

=== Film ===
Year	Title	Role	Note(s)	Ref(s).
2006	First Day High	Chairman Silla		
2007	One More Chance	Sir Bert		
2010	Emir	Amelia's dad		
2012	Corazon: Ang Unang Aswang	Maning		
2012	The Reunion	POP Principal/Priest		
2013	Tuhog	Lando		
2016	Saving Sally	Marty's father		
2017	Dear Other Self	Roger Macadaeg		
2018	Pan de Salawal	Mang Sal		
2019	Tayo sa Huling Buwan ng Taon	Frank's father		
2024	My Sassy Girl			
2025	Teresa (2025 film)	Principal Cruz		
2025	Quezon	Raymundo Melliza		
2025	Love You So Bad	Lolo Fred		
2026	Young Blood	Juan		

== Awards and recognition ==
- Winner, Best Children's Program Host For Batibot - PMPC Star Awards For TV 1987
