= Pong Pagong =

- Sesame!, Batibot character
- First appearance: 1983
- Last appearance: 1994
- Portrayed by: Deo Noveno
- Voiced by: Deo Noveno

In-universe information
- Species: Turtle
- Gender: Male

Pong Pagong is a muppet-style character developed by the Children's Television Workshop (CTW) for the Filipino children's show Sesame!, a co-production between CTW and the Philippine Children's Television Foundation (PCTF) which debuted in 1983. Pong Pagong is an anthropomorphic turtle, similar to Big Bird of Sesame Street, standing over six feet tall and towering over human co-stars and aged to be around six years old. Together with its co-muppet, Kiko Matsing, the characters were custom made in New York for Sesame. Both characters were inspired from a Filipino fable, "The Monkey and the Turtle", which was annotated to English by José Rizal in 1889.

After the cancellation of Sesame in 1984 due to the cancellation by CTW of the co-production venture, both characters appeared in its 1985 replacement show, Batibot, under a license arrangement with CTW. Both characters were returned to CTW in 1994 and never used again.
