= List of The Gift episodes =

The Gift is a 2019 Philippine drama television series broadcast by GMA Network. It premiered on the network's Telebabad evening block and worldwide on GMA Pinoy TV from September 16, 2019 to February 7, 2020, replacing Love You Two.

== Series overview ==
Season	Episodes	Originally released	
Season	Episodes	First released	Last released
1	105	September 16, 2019	February 7, 2020

== Episodes ==
No. overall	No. in season	Title	Social media hashtag	Original release date	AGB Nielsen Ratings (NUTAM People)	Timeslot rank
1	1	"World Premiere"	#TheGiftWorldPremiere	September 16, 2019	9.5%	#2
2	2	"Pagsubok" (transl. Trial)	#TheGiftPagsubok	September 17, 2019	10.4%	#2
3	3	"Pagkupkop" (transl. Keep)	#TheGiftPagkupkop	September 18, 2019	10.1%	#2
4	4	"Paglaki ni Sep" (transl. Growth of Sep)	#TheGiftPaglakiNiSep	September 19, 2019	11.0%	#2
5	5	"Pagkikita" (transl. Meeting)	#TheGiftPagkikita	September 20, 2019	11.2%	#2
6	6	"Tadhana" (transl. Destiny)	#TheGiftTadhana	September 23, 2019	11.1%	#2
7	7	"Tensyon" (transl. Tension)	#TheGiftTensyon	September 24, 2019	12.3%	#2
8	8	"Viral"	#TheGiftViral	September 25, 2019	11.0%	#2
9	9	"Pagtatalo" (transl. Dispute)	#TheGiftPagtatalo	September 26, 2019	11.6%	#2
10	10	"Panganib" (transl. Danger)	#TheGiftPanganib	September 27, 2019	12.0%	#2
11	11	"Laban" (transl. Fight)	#TheGiftLaban	September 30, 2019	9.6%	#2
12	12	"Kapit Lang" (transl. Hold On)	#TheGiftKapitLang	October 1, 2019	10.1%	#2
13	13	"Pag-asa" (transl. Hope)	#TheGiftPagAsa	October 2, 2019	10.6%	#2
14	14	"Imbestigasyon" (transl. Investigation)	#TheGiftImbestigasyon	October 3, 2019	10.8%	#2
15	15	"Suspect"	#TheGiftSuspect	October 4, 2019	11.1%	#2
16	16	"Vision"	#TheGiftVision	October 7, 2019	8.1%	#2
17	17	"Banta" (transl. Threat)	#TheGiftBanta	October 8, 2019	10.7%	#2
18	18	"Babala" (transl. Warning)	#TheGiftBabala	October 9, 2019	10.4%	#2
19	19	"Sikreto" (transl. Secret)	#TheGiftSikreto	October 10, 2019	10.0%	#2
20	20	"Tulong" (transl. Help)	#TheGiftTulong	October 11, 2019	9.1%	#2
21	21	"Proteksyon" (transl. Protection)	#TheGiftProteksyon	October 14, 2019	9.6%	#2
22	22	"Send Off"	#TheGiftSendOff	October 15, 2019	10.0%	#2
23	23	"Char"	#TheGiftChar	October 16, 2019	9.1%	#2
24	24	"Pagpili" (transl. Choice)	#TheGiftPagpili	October 17, 2019	9.9%	#2
25	25	"Tulay" (transl. Bridge)	#TheGiftTulay	October 18, 2019	9.6%	#2
26	26	"Pag-iwas" (transl. Avoid)	#TheGiftPagIwas	October 21, 2019	9.8%	#2
27	27	"Pakiusap" (transl. Request)	#TheGiftPakiusap	October 22, 2019	9.1%	#2
28	28	"Tibok ng Puso" (transl. Heartbeat)	#TheGiftTibokNgPuso	October 23, 2019	9.9%	#2
29	29	"Damdamin" (transl. Feelings)	#TheGiftDamdamin	October 24, 2019	9.7%	#2
30	30	"Guilt"	#TheGiftGulit	October 25, 2019	9.2%	#2
31	31	"Balak" (transl. Plan)	#TheGiftBalak	October 28, 2019	9.5%	#2
32	32	"Paghahanap" (transl. Search)	#TheGiftPaghahanap	October 29, 2019	9.9%	#2
33	33	"Larawan" (transl. Picture)	#TheGiftLarawan	October 30, 2019	9.2%	#2
34	34	"Pag-alis" (transl. Departure)	#TheGiftPagAlis	October 31, 2019	9.6%	#2
35	35	"Katotohanan" (transl. Truth)	#TheGiftKatotohanan	November 1, 2019	9.0%	#2
36	36	"Takot" (transl. Fear)	#TheGiftTakot	November 4, 2019	9.5%	#2
37	37	"Pakay" (transl. Aim)	#TheGiftPakay	November 5, 2019	9.5%	#2
38	38	"Pag-amin" (transl. Confession)	#TheGiftPagAmin	November 6, 2019	9.3%	#2
39	39	"Poot" (transl. Anger)	#TheGiftPoot	November 7, 2019	9.0%	#2
40	40	"Danger"	#TheGiftDanger	November 8, 2019	9.0%	#2
41	41	"Bintang" (transl. Blame)	#TheGiftBintang	November 11, 2019	9.6%	#2
42	42	"Conflict"	#TheGiftConflict	November 12, 2019	9.6%	#2
43	43	"Threat"	#TheGiftThreat	November 13, 2019	9.0%	#2
44	44	"Lies"	#TheGiftLies	November 14, 2019	9.1%	#2
45	45	"Truth"	#TheGiftTruth	November 15, 2019	9.1%	#2
46	46	"Galit" (transl. Anger)	#TheGiftGalit	November 18, 2019	7.6%	#2
47	47	"Confrontation"	#TheGiftConfrontation	November 19, 2019	8.9%	#2
48	48	"Pagbabanta" (transl. Warning)	#TheGiftPagbabanta	November 20, 2019	8.1%	#2
49	49	"Paninira" (transl. Ruin)	#TheGiftPaninira	November 21, 2019	8.1%	#2
50	50	"Cover Up"	#TheGiftCoverUp	November 22, 2019	9.8%	#2
51	51	"Hidden Truth"	#TheGiftHiddenTruth	November 25, 2019	8.9%	#2
52	52	"Laban Lang" (transl. Fight)	#TheGiftLabanLang	November 26, 2019	9.0%	#2
53	53	"Plano" (transl. Plan)	#TheGiftPlano	November 27, 2019	9.5%	#2
54	54	"Pagsagip" (transl. Rescue)	#TheGiftPagsagip	November 28, 2019	9.0%	#2
55	55	"Plea"	#TheGiftPlea	November 29, 2019	9.4%	#2
56	56	"Help"	#TheGiftHelp	December 2, 2019	9.6%	#2
57	57	"Pagdating" (transl. Arrival)	#TheGiftPagdating	December 3, 2019	9.7%	#2
58	58	"New Friend"	#TheGiftNewFriend	December 4, 2019	9.5%	#2
59	59	"Chase"	#TheGiftChase	December 5, 2019	9.3%	#2
60	60	"Hope"	#TheGiftHope	December 6, 2019	8.7%	#2
61	61	"Pabor" (transl. Favor)	#TheGiftPabor	December 9, 2019	9.0%	#2
62	62	"Dasal" (transl. Prayer)	#TheGiftDasal	December 10, 2019	9.2%	#2
63	63	"Sikreto" (transl. Secret)	#TheGiftSikreto	December 11, 2019	9.2%	#2
64	64	"Sugod" (transl. Dash)	#TheGiftSugod	December 12, 2019	9.8%	#2
65	65	"Saklolo" (transl. Help)	#TheGiftSaklolo	December 13, 2019	9.4%	#2
66	66	"Wanted"	#TheGiftWanted	December 16, 2019	9.8%	#2
67	67	"Sep at Helga" (transl. Sep and Helga)	#TheGiftSepAtHelga	December 17, 2019	9.6%	#2
68	68	"Kuya" (transl. Older Brother)	#TheGiftKuya	December 18, 2019	9.0%	#2
69	69	"Bonding"	#TheGiftBonding	December 19, 2019	8.7%	#2
70	70	"Kapatid" (transl. Sibling)	#TheGiftKapatid	December 20, 2019	8.9%	#2
71	71	"Ganti" (transl. Revenge)	#TheGiftGanti	December 23, 2019	8.7%	#2
72	72	"Episode 72"	#TheGift	December 24, 2019	6.1%	#2
73	73	"Episode 73"	#TheGift	December 25, 2019	7.5%	#2
74	74	"Ang Katotohanan" (transl. The Truth)	#TheGiftAngKatotohanan	December 26, 2019	8.0%	#2
75	75	"Hello, Uncle"	#TheGiftHelloUncle	December 27, 2019	8.6%	#2
76	76	"Alaala" (transl. Memory)	#TheGiftAlaala	December 30, 2019	8.7%	#2
77	77	"Biglaan" (transl. Suddenly)	#TheGiftBiglaan	December 31, 2019	8.5%	#2
78	78	"Bagong Buhay" (transl. New Life)	#TheGiftBagongBuhay	January 1, 2020	8.0%	#2
79	79	"Tuloy Ang Laban" (transl. The Fight Goes On)	#TheGiftTuloyAngLaban	January 2, 2020	8.4%	#2
80	80	"Episode 80"	#TheGift	January 3, 2020	8.4%	#2
81	81	"Pangitain" (transl. Vision)	#GMATheGiftPangitain	January 6, 2020	9.4%	#2
82	82	"Pangamba" (transl. Dread)	#GMATheGiftPangamba	January 7, 2020	8.7%	#2
83	83	"Lason" (transl. Poison)	#GMATheGiftLason	January 8, 2020	9.8%	#2
84	84	"Judgement"	#GMATheGiftJudgement	January 9, 2020	9.8%	#2
85	85	"Guilty"	#GMATheGiftGuilty	January 10, 2020	9.2%	#2
86	86	"Paalam" (transl. Goodbye)	#GMATheGiftPaalam	January 13, 2020	9.9%	#2
87	87	"Fear"	#GMATheGiftFear	January 14, 2020	9.7%	#2
88	88	"Revelation"	#GMATheGiftRevelation	January 15, 2020	9.6%	#2
89	89	"Kidnap"	#GMATheGiftKidnap	January 16, 2020	10.0%	#2
90	90	"Problema" (transl. Problem)	#GMATheGiftProblema	January 17, 2020	8.0%	#2
91	91	"Plan B"	#GMATheGiftPlanB	January 20, 2020	9.1%	#2
92	92	"Search"	#GMATheGiftSearch	January 21, 2020	9.4%	#2
93	93	"Desisyon" (transl. Decision)	#GMATheGiftDesisyon	January 22, 2020	9.1%	#2
94	94	"Huli" (transl. Caught)	#GMATheGiftHuli	January 23, 2020	8.0%	#2
95	95	"Straw"	#GMATheGiftStraw	January 24, 2020	9.2%	#2
96	96	"Manhunt"	#GMATheGiftManhunt	January 27, 2020	9.2%	#2
97	97	"Jared"	#GMATheGiftJared	January 28, 2020	9.9%	#2
98	98	"Nadia"	#GMATheGiftNadia	January 29, 2020	9.6%	#2
99	99	"Tunay na Ina" (transl. Real Mother)	#GMATheGiftTunayNaIna	January 30, 2020	8.7%	#2
100	100	"Hustisya" (transl. Justice)	#GMATheGiftHustisya	January 31, 2020	9.3%	#2
101	101	"Huling Lunes" (transl. Final Monday)	#GMATheGiftHulingLunes	February 3, 2020	10.3%	#2
102	102	"Huling Martes" (transl. Final Tuesday)	#GMATheGiftHulingMartes	February 4, 2020	9.5%	#2
103	103	"Huling Miyerkules" (transl. Final Wednesday)	#GMATheGiftHulingMiyerkules	February 5, 2020	9.7%	#2
104	104	"Huling Huwebes" (transl. Final Thursday)	#GMATheGiftHulingHuwebes	February 6, 2020	9.8%	#2
105	105	"Finale"	#GMATheGiftFinale	February 7, 2020	10.8%	#2
