= Batibot =

Philippine television educational show

- Title card
- Genre: Educational
- Created by: Feny Bautista; Rene Villanueva
- Directed by: Kokoy Jimenez
- Opening theme: Batibot theme song
- Country of origin: Philippines
- Original language: Tagalog
- No. of seasons: 4

Production
- Camera setup: Multiple-camera setup
- Production company: Philippine Children's Television Foundation

Original release
- Network: People's Television Network (1985–91); Radio Philippines Network (1985–91, 1994–95); ABS-CBN (1991–94); GMA Network (1995–2002); TV5 (2010–13)
- Release: 1985 – June 30, 2002
- Release: November 27, 2010 – 2013

Related
- Sesame! (1983–84)

Batibot is a Philippine television educational show produced by the Philippine Children's Television Foundation (PCTF). It debuted in 1985, a co-production of PCTV and the Children's Television Workshop (CTW) from 1983 to 1984.

== Background ==
The precursor of Batibot was Sesame!, a Filipino version of the American children's show, Sesame Street. Sesame! was a co-production of the Philippine Children's Television Foundation (PCTF) and the Children's Television Workshop (CTW) with support from the Philippine government. It aired in 1983 as a bilingual (Filipino and English) program. The series featured two Muppet-style characters Pong Pagong and Kiko Matsing. Both characters were inspired from a Filipino fable, "The Turtle and the Monkey", which was annotated to English by José Rizal in 1889.

Government support ended in 1984 and the co-production arrangement with CTW was cancelled.

== History ==
=== Batibot (1985–2002) ===
PCTF decided to produce the show Batibot. Debuting in February 1985, it was conceptualized and produced by Feny Delos Angeles-Bautista, a teacher from the Community of Learners Foundation and writer Rene Villanueva. Unlike the bilingual (Filipino and English) Sesame!, Batibot was done entirely in Filipino and featured stories in a Philippine context. An arrangement with CTW was made in order for the characters Pong Pagong and Kiko Matsing to continue their appearance including one human character Kuya Mario.

Airing on weekdays with a time slot of 10:30 AM, the series consistently ranked in 1985 among the top 10 daytime shows in the Philippines, outdoing the ratings of Sesame! and Sesame Street, which first aired in the country in 1970.

By February 1989, the producers were experiencing financial constraints which placed uncertainty regarding the future airing of the show. PCTF were in negotiations for an Indonesian version of Batibot; coincidentally, CTW were also in negotiations for an Indonesian version of Sesame Street. Shortly thereafter, CTW informed PCTF of their decision to repossess the characters Pong Pagong and Kiko Matsing. PCTF negotiated with CTW for the continued use of the characters for four more years under a license arrangement. Despite, the extension to use the characters, PCTF decided to phase out their appearances because of the costs. In 1994, Pong Pagong and Kiko Matsing were returned to CTW's new management.

In 1999, Batibot was relaunched as Batang Batibot airing on a Saturday morning timeslot.

Batibot ended its run on June 30, 2002.

=== TV5's Batibot (2010–13) ===
TV5 announced in 2010 that it would revive Batibot. It premiered on November 27, 2010. TV5's version of Batibot featured a different set of human characters, Ate Maya and Kuya Fidel. Instead of a Monday–Friday broadcast format, the new series was aired on Saturday at 8:30 a.m. The airing of the series lasted until 2013.

== Cast and characters ==
Batibot featured characters portrayed by puppets as well as human characters. Most of the puppets used for the show were locally made. Kiko Matsing and Pong Pagong who were among the main characters of the original Batibot were owned and crafted by CTW.

=== Batibot ===
- Junix Inocian as Kuya Mario
- Bodjie Pascua as Kuya Bodjie
- Sienna Olaso as Ate Sienna
- Ching Arellano as Kuya Ching
- Dwight Gaston as Kuya Dwight
- Isay Alvarez-Seña as Ate Isay
- Soliman Cruz as Mang Mokyo
- Alvin Froy Alemania as Popoy
- Adriana Agcaoili as Ate Jojie
- Rafael Mallanes as Rap Rap
- Sheila Gamo as Ate Celia
- Gerry Sanga as Kuya Mola

Puppets

- Kiko Matsing performed by Sammy Badon and assisted by Toots Javellana
- Pong Pagong performed by Deo Noveno
- Filimon - a duck with telescope
- Irma Daldal - very talkative TV field reporter
- Direk - loud-mouth director from segment of Sa Likod Ng Tabing.
- Koko Kwik-Kwak – a bird character inspired from the Philippine Eagle, based from Big Bird of Sesame Street
- Manang Bola – a forgetful fortuneteller
- Kapitan Basa – a character who has a magic book which he uses to answer questions from children
- Sitsiritsit and AlibangBang – a curious duo of aliens
- Ningning and Gingging – characters based from Ernie and Bert of Sesame Street

=== Batibot (2010) ===
Human characters

- Abner Delina as Kuya Fidel
- Kakki Teodoro as Ate Maya

Puppets

- Irma Daldal*
- Koko Kwik-Kwak*
- Manang Bola*
- Kapitan Basa*:
- Sitsiritsit*
- AlibangBang*
- Ningning
- Gingging*
- Tarsi- a tarsier

- – from the original Batibot

== Accolades ==
Accolades received by Batibot
Year	Award	Category	Recipient	Result	Ref.
1991	5th PMPC Star Awards for Television	Best Children's Show	Batibot	Nominated	
1991	5th PMPC Star Awards for Television	Best Children Show Host	Sienna Olaso	Nominated	
1992	6th PMPC Star Awards for Television	Best Children's Show	Batibot	Won	
2000	14th PMPC Star Awards for Television	Best Children's Show	Batang Batibot	Won	
2011	20th KBP Golden Dove Awards	Best Children's Program	Batibot	Won	
2011	Anak TV Seal Awards		Batibot	Won	
2012	Prix Jeunesse International Festival 2012	Up to 6 years old Non-fiction	Batibot	Finalist	
2012	26th PMPC Star Awards for Television	Best Educational/Children's Program	Batibot	Nominated	
2012	Anak TV Seal Awards		Batibot	Won	
2013	27th PMPC Star Awards for Television	Best Children Show	Batibot	Won	
2013	27th PMPC Star Awards for Television	Best Children Show Host	Kakki Teodoro, Abner Delina	Nominated	

== Video game ==
Batibot Games
- Batibot Games icon
- Developer: OrangeFix
- Platforms: Android; iOS
- Release: Android: WW: August 14, 2015; iOS: WW: July 5, 2017
- Genre: Educational

On August 14, 2015, Smart Communications launched a videogame for Android devices, based on the show. Smart together with the Community of Learners Foundation commissioned OrangeFix to develop the app. The development costed around one million Philippine pesos. It was specifically targeted to children from kindergarten to Grade 3, and aligned with the Department of Education's kindergarten curriculum and is in Filipino. An iOS version of the app was released on July 5, 2017.
