= Roadkillers =

Philippine streaming television miniseries

- Promotional poster
- Genre: Thriller; Action
- Written by: Pam Miras; Rae Red
- Directed by: Rae Red
- Starring: Nadine Lustre; Jerome Ponce; Bodjie Pascua; Francis Magundayao
- Music by: Jose Antonio Buencamino
- Country of origin: Philippines
- Original language: Filipino
- No. of episodes: 4

Production
- Cinematography: Tey Clamor
- Editors: Shane Robles; Lawrence Ang
- Camera setup: Single camera
- Running time: 41-42 minutes
- Production company: Studio Viva

Original release
- Network: Amazon Prime Video
- Release: 30 November – 7 December 2023

Roadkillers is a Philippine action thriller television miniseries directed and written by Rae Red, starring Nadine Lustre in the lead role. The show premiered on Amazon Prime Video on November 30, 2023, consisting of 4 episodes.

== Premise ==
An act of desperation turns into a race for survival. Stacey kills a patient to make room for her dying father. Now, she has to pay for the consequences of her crime.

== Cast and characters ==
=== Main ===
- Nadine Lustre as Stacey

A resilient woman in her late twenties. With chestnut hair and determined hazel eyes, she's coerced by a stranger into a dark path of theft and murder to save her captive father.

=== Supporting ===
- Jerome Ponce as Marco

A keen-eyed young man who unwittingly witnesses Stacey's descent into crime. Instead of exposing her misdeeds, he takes an unexpected turn, choosing to kidnap Stacey's father.

- Bodjie Pascua as Renato

Stacey's father who died from a disease brought on by a relentless pandemic.

- Francis Magundayao as Jairus

An adopted child of Renato.

- Elia Ilano as Young Stacey
- Allan Paule as Caloy
- Simon Ibarra as Jonas

== Episodes ==
No.	Title	Directed by	Original release date
1	"I'm No Angel"	Rae Red	November 30, 2023
At the height of the pandemic, Stacey finds herself at the hospital desperately seeking medical attention for her father, but the line is very long. She makes a fateful decision - doing the unthinkable just to have her father get a hospital bed. Little does she know someone is watching her every move.
2	"What Goes Around Comes Around"	Rae Red	November 30, 2023
Stacey and Jairus seek the help of her father's former boss, the ex-Mayor, but he turns them down. She steals one of the ex-mayor's luxury cars to raise money for the ransom of her dad. When she's about to meet her father's abductor, she sees a familiar face.
3	"Oil and Water"	Rae Red	December 7, 2023
Caloy suspects Dolfo, the ex-mayor's henchman, as the guy who hurt him and abducted Stacey's father. Stacey meets one of Dolfo's minions, Marco, who leads her to Dolfo's whereabouts. As Stacey is about to take matters into her own hands, more secrets unravel
4	"Period"	Rae Red	December 7, 2023
After a long chase, Stacey ends up at gunpoint with her father's abductor. A single gunshot shatters the silence, leaving one of them wounded, while the other resorts to a desperate act of survival.
