= Sesame! =

1983 Filipino children's television program

- Genre: Educational
- Country of origin: Philippines
- Original languages: English; Filipino

Production
- Production companies: Philippine Children's Television Foundation; Children's Television Workshop

Original release
- Release: 1983 – 1984

Related
- Batibot

Sesame! was the Filipino co-production of the American children's television program, Sesame Street. It ran for a single season in 1983, after which it was replaced by Batibot.

== Production ==
Sesame Street first aired in the Philippines in 1970.

Negotiations for a localized production began in 1983, and the series was jointly created by Children's Television Workshop and the Philippine Sesame Street Project (PSSP), which was funded by the Philippine government. The English segments were filmed in the United States, while the Tagalog segments were filmed in the Philippines.

The choice was made to have turtle and monkey muppets due to those animals' frequent appearances in Philippine folk tales.

== Cancellation ==
Government support for the show was pulled in 1984 after the Philippine economy collapsed. The Philippine producers were unable to afford their half of the co-production, and the arrangement dissolved.

Much of the show's crew and cast created the Philippine Children's Television Foundation, Inc. (PCTVF). This foundation went on to create Batibot, which maintained much of the Sesame Street formula while being produced solely by a Filipino team. The show was able to retain use of the Pong Pagong and Kiko Matsing puppets due to a license agreement with Children's Television Workshop.

== Content ==
The show ran for an hour, with one half in English and one half in Tagalog.

Messaging focused in part on teaching children a "sense of nationhood".

== Characters ==
=== Muppets ===
- Pong Pagong – a turtle who wears a beanie
- Kiko Matsing – a monkey
- the Byaps-Byaps

=== Humans ===
- Kuya Mario portrayed by Junix Inocian
- Ate Sylvia – played by Susan Africa
- Luz portrayed by Dessa Quesada
- Aling Nena portrayed by Angie Ferro
- Mang Lino portrayed by Joe Gruta
- Ben portrayed by Tito Quesada
