= List of Because of You episodes =

Because of You is a 2015 Philippine television drama romantic comedy series broadcast by GMA Network. It premiered on the network's Telebabad line up and worldwide on GMA Pinoy TV from November 30, 2015 to May 13, 2016, replacing Beautiful Strangers.

Mega Manila ratings are provided by AGB Nielsen Philippines.

== Series overview ==
Month	Episodes	Monthly Averages
Month	Episodes	Mega Manila
November 2015	1	19.8%
December 2015	23	21.2%
January 2016	21	20.2%
February 2016	21	18.5%
March 2016	21	19.4%
April 2016	21	17.8%
May 2016	9	17.8%
Total	117	19.2%

== Episodes ==
=== November 2015 ===
Episode		Original air date	Social Media Hashtag	AGB Nielsen Mega Manila Households in Television Homes			Ref.
Episode		Original air date	Social Media Hashtag	Rating	Timeslot Rank	Primetime Rank	Ref.
1	Pilot	November 30, 2015	#BecauseOfYou	19.8%	#1	#6	

=== December 2015 ===
Episode		Original air date	Social Media Hashtag	AGB Nielsen Mega Manila Households in Television Homes			Ref.
Episode		Original air date	Social Media Hashtag	Rating	Timeslot Rank	Primetime Rank	Ref.
2	Mystery Hero	December 1, 2015	#BOYMysteryHero	21.5%	#1	#6	
3	Andrea's Job Search	December 2, 2015	#BOYAndreasJobSearch	21.2%	#1	#5	
4	Boss Yummy	December 3, 2015	#BOYBossYummy	20.3%	#1	#6	
5	Oliver Returns	December 4, 2015	#BOYOliverReturns	22.1%	#1	#4	
6	Jaime's Heartbreak	December 7, 2015	#BOYJaimesHeartbreak	22.4%	#1	#5	
7	Family Problem	December 8, 2015	#BOYFamilyProblem	22.6%	#1	#2	
8	Wanted: Girlfriend	December 9, 2015	#BOYWantedGirlfriend	20.9%	#1	#6	
9	Pak sa Ganda!	December 10, 2015	#BOYPakSaGanda	21.1%	#1	#5	
10	Sorry, Andrea!	December 11, 2015	#BOYSorryAndrea	23.3%	#1	#3	
11	Secret	December 14, 2015	#BOYSecret	20.0%	#1	#6	
12	The Truth	December 15, 2015	#BOYTheTruth	20.3%	#1	#5	
13	Angry Boss	December 16, 2015	#BOYAngryBoss	21.5%	#1	#4	
14	Andrea vs. Kids	December 17, 2015	#BOYAndreaVsKids	21.1%	#1	#4	
15	Resignation	December 18, 2015	#BOYResignation	22.8%	#1	#3	
16	The Choice	December 21, 2015	#BOYTheChoice	22.5%	#1	#4	
17	New Life	December 22, 2015	#BOYNewLife	22.9%	#1	#1	
18	Jaime Meets Andie	December 23, 2015	#BOYJaimeMeetsAndie	23.2%	#1	#1	
19	Girl Fight	December 24, 2015	#BOYGirlFight	18.9%	#1	#1	
20	Fight Lang!	December 25, 2015	#BOYFightLang	16.6%	#1	#4	
21	Poor Andie	December 28, 2015	#BOYPoorAndie	22.4%	#1	#2	
22	Da Moves ni Oliver	December 29, 2015	#BOYDaMovesNiOliver	21.6%	#1	#2	
23	Happy Trip	December 30, 2015	#BOYHappyTrip	20.8%	#1	#3	
24	In Love	December 31, 2015	#BOYInLove	18.1%	#1	#2	

=== January 2016 ===
Episode		Original air date	Social Media Hashtag	AGB Nielsen Mega Manila Households in Television Homes			Ref.
Episode		Original air date	Social Media Hashtag	Rating	Timeslot Rank	Primetime Rank	Ref.
25	Love Triangle	January 1, 2016	#BOYLoveTriangle	19.1%	#1	#4	
26	Tender Loving Care	January 4, 2016	#BOYTenderLovingCare	19.3%	#1	#4	
27	Nasaan ka, Jaime?	January 5, 2016	#BOYNasaanKaJaime	20.0%	#1	#4	
28	Ligawan Again	January 6, 2016	#BOYLigawanAgain	20.4%	#1	#5	
29	Romantic Night	January 7, 2016	#BOYRomanticNight	21.3%	#1	#4	
30	Andrea's Father	January 8, 2016	#BOYAndreasFather	24.0%	#1	#3	
31	Jaime Misses Andrea	January 11, 2016	#BOYJaimeMissesAndrea	20.5%	#1	#4	
32	User	January 12, 2016	#BOYUser	20.9%	#1	#3	
33	Andrea's Birthday	January 13, 2016	#BOYAndreasBirthday	20.4%	#1	#3	
34	Go, Oliver!	January 14, 2016	#BOYGoOliver	22.0%	#1	#4	
35	Jaime is Back	January 15, 2016	#BOYJaimeIsBack	20.6%	#1	#4	
36	Jaime vs. Oliver	January 18, 2016	#BOYJaimeVsOliver	21.0%	#1	#4	
37	Fight for Andrea	January 19, 2016	#BOYFightForAndrea	18.3%	#1	#5	
38	Battle Continues	January 20, 2016	#BOYBattleContinues	21.1%	#1	#3	
39	Team Building	January 21, 2016	#BOYTeamBuilding	22.8%	#1	#2	
40	Be My Girlfriend	January 22, 2016	#BOYBeMyGirlfriend	20.6%	#1	#3	
41	More Kilig	January 25, 2016	#BOYMoreKilig	17.3%	#1	#7	
42	Veronica Returns	January 26, 2016	#BOYVeronicaReturns	20.1%	#1	#6	
43	Love Problems	January 27, 2016	#BOYLoveProblems	16.1%	#1	#6	
44	Jealous Andrea	January 28, 2016	#BOYJealousAndrea	19.8%	#1	#6	
45	First Kiss	January 29, 2016	#BOYFirstKiss	17.8%	#1	#5	

=== February 2016 ===
Episode		Original air date	Social Media Hashtag	AGB Nielsen Mega Manila Households in Television Homes			Ref.
Episode		Original air date	Social Media Hashtag	Rating	Timeslot Rank	Primetime Rank	Ref.
46	Frustrated	February 1, 2016	#BOYFrustrated	20.0%	#1	#5	
47	Fight for Love	February 2, 2016	#BOYFightForLove	21.5%	#1	#6	
48	Change of Plans	February 3, 2016	#BOYChangeOfPlans	15.7%	#1	#6	
49	Double Date	February 4, 2016	#BOYDoubleDate	19.4%	#1	#6	
50	Lovers Quarrel	February 5, 2016	#BOYLoversQuarrel	21.2%	#1	#5	
51	Go, Andrea!	February 8, 2016	#BOYGoAndrea	18.0%	#1	#7	
52	Lunch Date	February 9, 2016	#BOYLunchDate	20.6%	#1	#5	
53	Sermon ni Mama	February 10, 2016	#BOYSermonNiMama	17.4%	#1	#6	
54	All for Love	February 11, 2016	#BOYAllForLove	18.3%	#1	#6	
55	The Choice	February 12, 2016	#BOYTheChoice	18.5%	#1	#5	
56	Guilty Andrea	February 15, 2016	#BOYGuiltyAndrea	16.7%	#1	#7	
57	Kapit Lang!	February 16, 2016	#BOYKapitLang	18.0%	#1	#6	
58	Worried Jaime	February 17, 2016	#BOYWorriedJaime	17.8%	#1	#6	
59	Big Sacrifice	February 18, 2016	#BOYBigSacrifice	19.0%	#1	#5	
60	Missing You	February 19, 2016	#BOYMissingYou	20.4%	#1	#6	
61	Jealous Jaime	February 22, 2016	#BOYJealousJaime	17.9%	#1	#6	
62	Dance Lessons	February 23, 2016	#BOYDanceLessons	16.2%	#2	#8	
63	More Tension	February 24, 2016	#BOYMoreTension	18.8%	#2	#7	
64	Andrea vs. Veronica	February 25, 2016	#BOYAndreaVsVeronica	17.1%	#2	#8	
65	Ikaw Pa Rin	February 26, 2016	#BOYIkawPaRin	18.2%	#2	#5	
66	Love or Career?	February 29, 2016	#BOYLoveOrCareer	18.3%	#1	#7	

=== March 2016 ===
Episode		Original air date	Social Media Hashtag	AGB Nielsen Mega Manila Households in Television Homes			Ref.
Episode		Original air date	Social Media Hashtag	Rating	Timeslot Rank	Primetime Rank	Ref.
67	Follow Your Heart	March 1, 2016	#BOYFollowYourHeart	17.6%	#1	#6	
68	Together Again	March 2, 2016	#BOYTogetherAgain	17.5%	#1	#6	
69	Para sa Forever	March 3, 2016	#BOYParaSaForever	18.6%	#1	#6	
70	Veronica's Secret	March 4, 2016	#BOYVeronicasSecret	19.5%	#1	#5	
71	Secret Revealed	March 7, 2016	#BOYSecretRevealed	18.5%	#1	#6	
72	Andrea Cares	March 8, 2016	#BOYAndreaCares	20.4%	#1	#6	
73	Friends Na	March 9, 2016	#BOYFriendsNa	21.2%	#1	#4	
74	Tamang Duda	March 10, 2016	#BOYTamangDuda	19.9%	#1	#5	
75	Getting Closer	March 11, 2016	#BOYGettingCloser	19.9%	#1	#6	
76	Meet My Father	March 14, 2016	#BOYMeetMyFather	20.8%	#1	#6	
77	Laban, Jaime!	March 15, 2016	#BOYLabanJaime	20.7%	#1	#6	
78	Where is Cheska?	March 16, 2016	#BOYWhereIsCheska	20.6%	#1	#6	
79	One Million Reward	March 17, 2016	#BOYOneMillionReward	20.8%	#1	#6	
80	Hide and Seek	March 18, 2016	#BOYHideAndSeek	20.3%	#1	#4	
81	Biglang Takas	March 21, 2016	#BOYBiglangTakas	20.0%	#1	#6	
82	Reunited	March 22, 2016	#BOYReunited	20.0%	#1	#5	
83	Sacrifice	March 23, 2016	#BOYSacrifice	20.9%	#1	#5	
84	Oliver's Lie	March 28, 2016	#BOYOliversLie	16.2%	#1	#6	
85	Change of Heart	March 29, 2016	#BOYChangeOfHeart	16.9%	#1	#6	
86	Para Kay Jaime	March 30, 2016	#BOYParaKayJaime	17.8%	#1	#6	
87	Please Say Yes	March 31, 2016	#BOYPleaseSayYes	18.7%	#1	#5	

=== April 2016 ===
Episode		Original air date	Social Media Hashtag	AGB Nielsen Mega Manila Households in Television Homes			Ref.
Episode		Original air date	Social Media Hashtag	Rating	Timeslot Rank	Primetime Rank	Ref.
88	Meet Lucille	April 1, 2016	#BOYMeetLucille	19.3%	#1	#4	
89	Wedding Plans	April 4, 2016	#BOYWeddingPlans	18.7%	#1	#6	
90	Jaime Forever	April 5, 2016	#BOYJaimeForever	16.0%	#1	#6	
91	Stolen Date	April 6, 2016	#BOYStolenDate	19.6%	#1	#6	
92	Alex vs. Rebecca	April 7, 2016	#BOYAlexVsRebecca	18.7%	#1	#6	
93	Maid of Honor	April 8, 2016	#BOYMaidOfHonor	17.5%	#1	#6	
94	Andrea's Choice	April 11, 2016	#BOYAndreasChoice	16.5%	#1	#6	
95	Pamamanhikan	April 12, 2016	#BOYPamamanhikan	17.4%	#1	#7	
96	Clash of the Tanders	April 13, 2016	#BOYClashOfTheTanders	17.6%	#1	#6	
97	For Andrea N' Jaime	April 14, 2016	#BOYForAndreaNJaime	19.1%	#1	#6	
98	Party Pa More	April 15, 2016	#BOYPartyPaMore	19.5%	#1	#4	
99	Friends in Trouble	April 18, 2016	#BOYFriendsInTrouble	17.0%	#1	#6	
100	Kilig Surprise	April 19, 2016	#BOYKiligSurprise	16.9%	#1	#6	
101	Ex and BFF	April 20, 2016	#BOYExAndBFF	16.8%	#1	#6	
102	Love Pa Rin Kita	April 21, 2016	#BOYLovePaRinKita	16.1%	#1	#6	
103	Andrea's Gown	April 22, 2016	#BOYAndreasGown	17.8%	#1	#5	
104	Secrets	April 25, 2016	#BOYSecrets	16.0%	#1	#7	
105	The Truth	April 26, 2016	#BOYTheTruth	17.3%	#1	#5	
106	Denial	April 27, 2016	#BOYDenial	18.5%	#1	#5	
107	Giving Up	April 28, 2016	#BOYGivingUp	17.4%	#1	#4	
108	For Hummy	April 29, 2016	#BOYForHummy	19.1%	#1	#4	

=== May 2016 ===
Episode		Original air date	Social Media Hashtag	AGB Nielsen Mega Manila Households in Television Homes			Ref.
Episode		Original air date	Social Media Hashtag	Rating	Timeslot Rank	Primetime Rank	Ref.
109	Save Andrea	May 2, 2016	#BOYSaveAndrea	17.5%	#1	#5	
110	Confrontation	May 3, 2016	#BOYConfrontation	17.4%	#1	#5	
111	Laban for Love	May 4, 2016	#BOYLabanForLove	16.2%	#1	#5	
112	Sacrifice for Love	May 5, 2016	#BOYSacrificeForLove	16.9%	#1	#6	
113	Prenup Shoot	May 6, 2016	#BOYPrenupShoot	17.8%	#1	#4	
114	Wedding Blues	May 10, 2016 (Note: Episode 114 did not air on May 9 during the 2016 Philippine general election news coverage.)	#BOYWeddingBlues	18.1%	#1	#6	
115	The Bride	May 11, 2016	#BOYTheBride	18.6%	#1	#4	
116	Confession	May 12, 2016	#BOYConfession	18.4%	#1	#6	
117	Happy Ever After	May 13, 2016	#BOYHappyEverAfter	19.6%	#1	#3	

Episodes notes
