= Nanay Tatay =

2024 horror film directed by Roni Benaid

Nanay, Tatay
- Directed by: Roni Benaid
- Written by: Roni Benaid; Juan Carlos Magtalas
- Produced by: Vincent Del Rosario III; Valerie S. Del Rosario; Veronique Del Rosario-Corpus
- Starring: Andrea del Rosario; Jeffrey Hidalgo; Elia Ilano; Aubrey Caraan; Heart Ryan; Xia Vigor
- Cinematography: Eli Balce
- Edited by: Matthew Lorenzo
- Music by: Emerzon Texon
- Production companies: Happy Infinite Productions; Studio Viva; Viva Films
- Distributed by: Viva Films
- Release date: October 30, 2024 (Philippines)
- Running time: 120 minutes
- Country: Philippines
- Language: Filipino

Nanay, Tatay is a 2024 Philippine supernatural horror thriller film written and directed by Roni Benaid. It stars Andrea del Rosario, Jeffrey Hidalgo, Elia Ilano, Aubrey Caraan, Heart Ryan and Xia Vigor.

== Cast ==
- Jeffrey Hidalgo as Tatay Lino
- Andrea del Rosario as Nanay Amanda
- Elia Ilano as Malena
- Aubrey Caraan as Bettina
- Heart Ryan as Paula
- Xia Vigor as Olive

== Release ==
The film was released in the Philippines on October 30, 2024, by Viva Films as part of Sine Sindak Film Festival ika-5 yugto..

== Awards ==
Award ceremony	Year	Category	Artist	Result	Ref
Rising Filipino Awards	2024	Best Child Performer	Elia Ilano	Won	
13th OFW Gawad Parangal	2024	Best Child Actress	Elia Ilano	Won	
4th Primetime Media Choice Awards	2025	Best Child Actress	Elia Ilano	Won	
World Icon of Excellence and Leadership Awards	2025	Best Child Actress	Elia Ilano	Won	
Manila Film Critics Awards 2025	2025	Breakthrough Performance Award	Elia Ilano	Won	
1st PAFTA Awards	2026	Best Child Actress	Elia Ilano	Won	
