= List of Love You Two episodes =

Love You Two is a 2019 Philippine television drama romantic comedy series broadcast by GMA Network. It premiered on the network's Telebabad line up and worldwide via GMA Pinoy TV on April 22 to September 13, 2019, replacing TODA One I Love.

== Series overview ==
Month	Episodes	Monthly averages
Month	Episodes	NUTAM
April 2019	7	8.9%
May 2019	22	9.1%
June 2019	20	7.9%
July 2019	23	6.8%
August 2019	22	6.9%
September 2019	10	8.2%
Total	104	8.0%

== Episodes ==
=== April 2019 ===
Episode		Original air date	Social media hashtag	AGB Nielsen NUTAM People in Television Homes		Ref.
Episode		Original air date	Social media hashtag	Rating	Timeslot rank	Ref.
1	"Pilot"	April 22, 2019	#LoveYouTwo	9.9%	#2	
2	"Raffy Meets Jake"	April 23, 2019	#LYTRaffyMeetsJake	9.0%	#2	
3	"Asa Pa More" (transl. Hope More)	April 24, 2019	#LYTAsaPaMore	9.0%	#2	
4	"Ninja Moves"	April 25, 2019	#LYTNinjaMoves	8.5%	#2	
5	"Walwalan"	April 26, 2019	#LYTWalwalan	8.1%	#2	
6	"My New Boss"	April 29, 2019	#LYTMyNewBoss	9.0%	#2	
7	"Huli Ka, Sis" (transl. You're Caught, Sis)	April 30, 2019	#LYTHuliKaSis	9.0%	#2	

=== May 2019 ===
Episode		Original air date	Social media hashtag	AGB Nielsen NUTAM People in Television Homes		Ref.
Episode		Original air date	Social media hashtag	Rating	Timeslot rank	Ref.
8	"Tita Raffy of Manila" (transl. Aunt Raffy of Manila)	May 1, 2019	#LYTTitaRaffyOfManila	8.7%	#1	
9	"Raffy vs. Sam"	May 2, 2019	#LYTRaffyVsSam	9.8%	#1	
10	"Sisters Forever"	May 3, 2019	#LYTSistersForever	9.3%	#1	
11	"Officially"	May 6, 2019	#LYTOfficially	10.6%	#1	
12	"Meet the Batungbakals"	May 7, 2019	#LYTMeetTheBatungbakals	10.3%	#1	
13	"Beach, Please"	May 8, 2019	#LYTBeachPlease	10.2%	#1	
14	"Beach Body"	May 9, 2019	#LYTBeachBody	10.1%	#1	
15	"Let's Chill"	May 10, 2019	#LYTLetsChill	9.8%	#1	
16	"Party Party"	May 14, 2019 (Note: Episode 16 did not air on May 13 during the 2019 Philippine general election news coverage.)	#LYTPartyParty	9.3%	#1	
17	"Phone Call"	May 15, 2019	#LYTPhoneCall	7.6%	#1	
18	"Jake Loves You Two"	May 16, 2019	#JakeLovesYouTwo	9.9%	#1	
19	"Asumera" (transl. Assumer)	May 17, 2019	#LYTAsumera	8.6%	#1	
20	"Break Up"	May 20, 2019	#LYTBreakUp	8.0%	#1	
21	"Zombieing"	May 21, 2019	#LYTZombieing	9.8%	#1	
22	"Love You Too, Pare"	May 22, 2019	#LYTLoveYouTooPare	8.7%	#1	
23	"Confirmed"	May 23, 2019	#LYTConfirmed	8.8%	#1	
24	"The Kiss"	May 24, 2019	#LYTTheKiss	8.1%	#1	
25	"After Shock"	May 27, 2019	#LYTAfterShock	8.2%	#1	
26	"Ex"	May 28, 2019	#LYTEx	9.1%	#1	
27	"Getting Closer"	May 29, 2019	#LYTGettingCloser	8.7%	#1	
28	"Tibok" (transl. Beat)	May 30, 2019	#LYTTibok	8.8%	#1	
29	"Forget Me Not"	May 31, 2019	#LYTForgetMeNot	8.6%	#1	

=== June 2019 ===
Episode		Original air date	Social media hashtag	AGB Nielsen NUTAM People in Television Homes		Ref.
Episode		Original air date	Social media hashtag	Rating	Timeslot rank	Ref.
30	"Karibal Ko Ate Ko" (transl. My Sister is My Rival)	June 3, 2019	#LYTKaribalKoAteKo	7.9%	#1	
31	"Torn"	June 4, 2019	#LYTTorn	8.9%	#1	
32	"San Agustin"	June 5, 2019	#LYTSanAgustin	8.2%	#1	
33	"Runaway"	June 6, 2019	#LYTRunaway	8.2%	#1	
34	"Lianne"	June 7, 2019	#LYTLianne	8.4%	#1	
35	"Third Wheel"	June 10, 2019	#LYTThirdWheel	7.9%	#1	
36	"Friendzone"	June 11, 2019	#LYTFriendzone	7.7%	#1	
37	"Deretsahan" (transl. Straightforward)	June 12, 2019	#LYTDeretsahan	8.0%	#1	
38	"Aminan" (transl. Confessing)	June 13, 2019	#LYTAminan	8.0%	#1	
39	"Basta Mahal Kita" (transl. At Least I Love You)	June 14, 2019	#LYTBastaMahalKita	8.0%	#1	
40	"The Hangover"	June 17, 2019	#LYTTheHangover	7.4%	#1	
41	"Affected Much?"	June 18, 2019	#LYTAffectedMuch	8.0%	#1	
42	"Love You 3"	June 19, 2019	#LYTLoveYou3	7.0%	#2	
43	"Torete" (transl. Crazy)	June 20, 2019	#LYTTorete	7.4%	#1	
44	"I Shall Return"	June 21, 2019	#LYTIShallReturn	7.8%	#1	
45	"Truth or Dare"	June 24, 2019	#LYTTruthOrDare	7.1%	#1	
46	"Kiss Me"	June 25, 2019	#LYTKissMe	7.8%	#1	
47	"Clingy"	June 26, 2019	#LYTClingy	7.8%	#1	
48	"Hide and Seek"	June 27, 2019	#LYTHideAndSeek	8.0%	#1	
49	"Sinong Tatay Mo?" (transl. Who's Your Father?)	June 28, 2019	#LYTSinongTatayMo	8.5%	#1	

=== July 2019 ===
Episode		Original air date	Social media hashtag	AGB Nielsen NUTAM People in Television Homes		Ref.
Episode		Original air date	Social media hashtag	Rating	Timeslot rank	Ref.
50	"Love Yourself"	July 1, 2019	#LYTLoveYourself	6.7%	#1	
51	"Naked Truth"	July 2, 2019	#LYTNakedTruth	7.2%	#1	
52	"Push Mo 'Yan!" (transl. You Push It!)	July 3, 2019	#LYTPushMoYan	6.0%	#2	
53	"True Colors"	July 4, 2019	#LYTTrueColors	6.7%	#1	
54	"Heart You Mare"	July 5, 2019	#LYTHeartYouMare	6.9%	#1	
55	"Tag Team"	July 8, 2019	#LYTTagTeam	7.0%	#2	
56	"Asar Talo" (transl. Annoyed Lost)	July 9, 2019	#LYTAsarTalo	7.8%	#1	
57	"Round 2"	July 10, 2019	#LYTRound2	7.3%	#1	
58	"Real Talk"	July 11, 2019	#LYTRealTalk	7.5%	#1	
59	"Sister Zoned"	July 12, 2019	#LYTSisterZoned	6.1%	#2	
60	"Marry You"	July 15, 2019	#LYTMarryYou	6.9%	#1	
61	"Triple Date"	July 16, 2019	#LYTTripleDate	6.0%	#2	
62	"Bida Bida" (transl. Protagonist Protagonist)	July 17, 2019	#LYTBidaBida	5.6%	#2	
63	"SamSon"	July 18, 2019	#LYTSamSon	6.4%	#2	
64	"Theo is Back"	July 19, 2019	#LYTTheoIsBack	7.4%	#2	
65	"Theo vs. Jake"	July 22, 2019	#LYTTheoVsJake	6.1%	#2	
66	"Jelly Jake"	July 23, 2019	#LYTJellyJake	6.4%	#2	
67	"Excess Baggage"	July 24, 2019	#LYTExcessBaggage	6.5%	#2	
68	"Paandar" (transl. Pun)	July 25, 2019	#LYTPaandar	7.5%	#2	
69	"Ligaw Tingin" (transl. Lost Look)	July 26, 2019	#LYTLigawTingin	7.1%	#2	
70	"May Nanalo Na" (transl. There's Now a Winner)	July 29, 2019	#LYTMayNanaloNa	7.8%	#2	
71	"Bitter"	July 30, 2019	#LYTBitter	7.0%	#2	
72	"Walang Kayo" (transl. No You)	July 31, 2019	#LYTWalangKayo	7.0%	#2	

=== August 2019 ===
Episode		Original air date	Social media hashtag	AGB Nielsen NUTAM People in Television Homes		Ref.
Episode		Original air date	Social media hashtag	Rating	Timeslot rank	Ref.
73	"May Something" (transl. There's Something)	August 1, 2019	#LYTMaySomething	7.9%	#2	
74	"143"	August 2, 2019	#LYT143	6.0%	#2	
75	"Jombagan"	August 5, 2019	#LYTJombagan	5.9%	#2	
76	"Love Ko o Love Ako?" (transl. I Love or Loves Me?)	August 6, 2019	#LYTLoveKoOLoveAko	5.8%	#2	
77	"Overnight"	August 7, 2019	#LYTOvernight	6.0%	#2	
78	"Iwasan" (transl. Avoid)	August 8, 2019	#LYTIwasan	5.6%	#2	
79	"Heart in Hostage"	August 9, 2019	#LYTHeartInHostage	5.3%	#2	
80	"Fallin"	August 12, 2019	#LYTFallin	6.0%	#2	
81	"Bayani" (transl. Hero)	August 13, 2019	#LYTBayani	6.1%	#2	
82	"Urong Sulong" (transl. Backward Forward)	August 14, 2019	#LYTUrongSulong	6.0%	#2	
83	"Ibigay Mo Na" (transl. You Give It Up)	August 15, 2019	#LYTIbigayMoNa	6.3%	#2	
84	"Team Jaffy"	August 16, 2019	#LYTTeamJaffy	6.0%	#2	
85	"Pinaagang Kilig" (transl. Earlier Romantic Excitement)	August 19, 2019	#LYTPinaagangKilig	7.6%	#2	
86	"Mr. and Mrs. Reyes"	August 20, 2019	#LYTMrAndMrsReyes	7.8%	#2	
87	"Saving Jake"	August 21, 2019	#LYTSavingJake	8.0%	#2	
88	"Stalker Alert"	August 22, 2019	#LYTStalkerAlert	8.1%	#2	
89	"Salawahan" (transl. Unlucky)	August 23, 2019	#LYTSalawahan	8.2%	#2	
90	"Liar Liar"	August 26, 2019	#LYTLiarLiar	8.0%	#2	
91	"The Antidote"	August 27, 2019	#LYTTheAntidote	7.3%	#2	
92	"Itigil ang Kasal" (transl. Stop the Wedding)	August 28, 2019	#LYTItigilAngKasal	8.1%	#2	
93	"Triggered"	August 29, 2019	#LYTTriggered	8.0%	#2	
94	"Meet the Parents"	August 30, 2019	#LYTMeetTheParents	7.9%	#2	

=== September 2019 ===
Episode		Original air date	Social media hashtag	AGB Nielsen NUTAM People in Television Homes		Ref.
Episode		Original air date	Social media hashtag	Rating	Timeslot rank	Ref.
95	"Finding Dada"	September 2, 2019	#LYTFindingDada	8.0%	#2	
96	"Lost and Found"	September 3, 2019	#LYTLostAndFound	7.6%	#2	
97	"Marry Me"	September 4, 2019	#LYTMarryMe	7.9%	#2	
98	"Wedding Gown"	September 5, 2019	#LYTWeddingGown	8.1%	#2	
99	"Remember Me"	September 6, 2019	#LYTRememberMe	9.0%	#2	
100	"Looking for Jake"	September 9, 2019	#LYTLookingForJake	7.7%	#2	
101	"Last Hugot Tuesday"	September 10, 2019	#LYTLastHugotTuesday	8.6%	#2	
102	"Last Romantic Wednesday"	September 11, 2019	#LYTLastRomanticWednesday	8.3%	#2	
103	"Last Lovely Thursday"	September 12, 2019	#LYTLastLovelyThursday	8.0%	#2	
104	"The Kilig Finale" transl. (The Romantic Finale)	September 13, 2019	#LYTTheKiligFinale	8.5%	#2	

Episodes notes
