= Artsy Craftsy =

Philippine television show

- Season 2 hosts Elia, Joseph and Cholo
- Genre: Informative
- Presented by: Mark Joseph Ancheta aka "Kuya Joseph"; Cholo Castillo; Yumi Sansano; Elia Ilano
- Country of origin: Philippines
- Original language: Filipino
- No. of episodes: Season 1 (13 episodes) Season 2 (13 episodes) Season 3 (13 episodes) Season 4 (14 episodes) Season 5 (14 episodes) Season 6 (14 episodes) Season 7 (ongoing)

Production
- Camera setup: Multiple-camera setup
- Running time: 30 minutes
- Production company: People's Television Network

Original release
- Network: People's Television Network
- Release: May 11, 2024 – present

Artsy Craftsy is a Philippine television informative show broadcast by People's Television Network. It was hosted by Mark Joseph Ancheta aka "Kuya Joseph", Yumi Sansano, and Nicollo Cholo on its first season which started last May 11, 2024. For its second season which premiered last August 31, 2024, Mark Joseph Ancheta aka "Kuya Joseph", Cholo Castillo, and Elia Ilano served as its hosts. The third season aired December 7, 2024 retaining the same hosts, Mark Joseph Ancheta aka "Kuya Joseph", Nicollo Cholo, and Elia Ilano. The fourth season aired March 8, 2025.

The show currently airs every Saturday, from 10:30AM to 11:00AM. It is also shown simultaneously on PTV-4's Facebook and Youtube account.

== Awards and nominations ==
Year	Awards	Category	Recipient	Result	Ref.
2024	2024 Net Makabata Star Awards	Male and Female Category	Joseph Ancheta, Yumi Sansanto and Nicollo Cholo	Nominated	
2024	7th Gawad Lasallianeta	Most Outstanding Educational Show and Hosts	Joseph Ancheta, Elia Ilano and Nicollo Cholo	Nominated	
2025	PMPC Star Awards for Television	Best Children Show	Artsy Craftsy	Nominated	
2025	PMPC Star Awards for Television	Best Children Show Host	Elia Ilano, Joseph Ancheta, Nicollo Cholo and Yumi Sansanto	Nominated	
2025	Philippine Faces of Success 2025 (2nd Young Faces of Success)	Official Awardee - For outstanding contribution as a TV, Movie, Stage Actress and TV Host	Elia Ilano	Won	
2025	19th Gandingan Awards	Most Development-Oriented Children's Program	Artsy Craftsy	Won	
2025	Asia Diamond Elite Awards 2025	Cultural Beacon Award for Transformative Roles in Film, Stage, and Youth Television	Elia Ilano	Won	
2025	National Council for Children's Television Awards 2025	Child-Friendly Television Program	Artsy Craftsy	Won	
2025	2025 Net Makabata Star Awards	Male and Female Category	Joseph Ancheta, Elia Ilano and Nicollo Cholo	Nominated	
2025	Anak TV Seal Awards 2025	Anak TV Seal Awardee	Artsy Craftsy	Won	
2025	8th Gawad Lasallianeta	Most Outstanding Educational and Youth Oriented Show and Hosts	Joseph Ancheta, Elia Ilano and Nicollo Cholo	Nominated	
2026	11th Platinum Stallion National Media Awards	Citation for Informative Children's Program	Artsy Craftsy	Won	
2026	20th Gandingan Awards	Most Development-Oriented Children's Program	Artsy Craftsy	Won	
2026	1st FAMAS Broadcast Arts Awards	Best Educational Show	Artsy Craftsy	Nominated	
