= Shermaine Santiago =

Filipino actor and singer

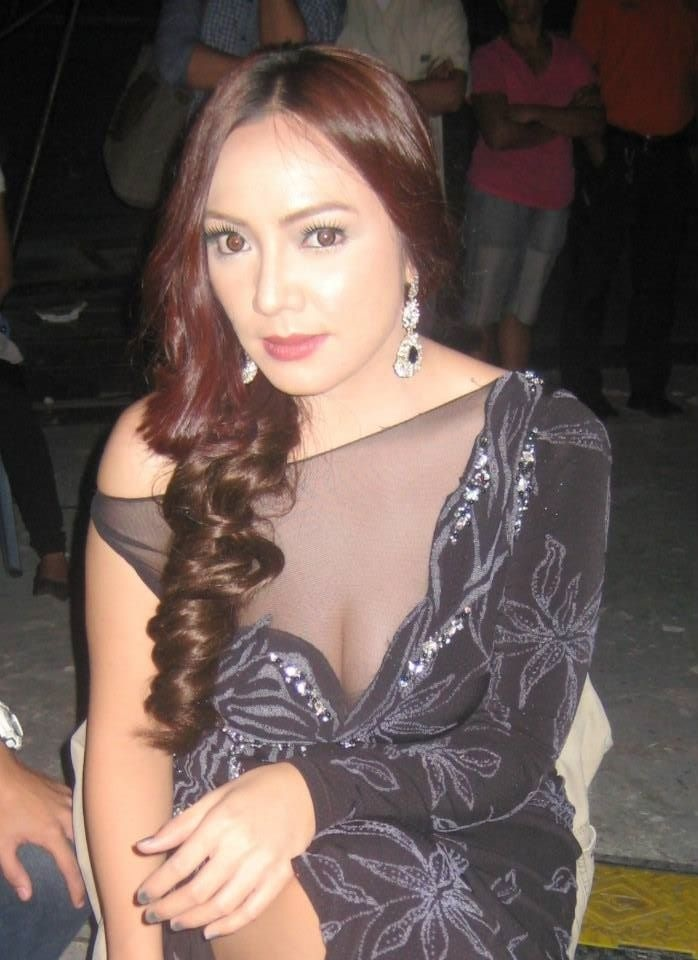
- Santiago attending the 17th year anniversary of Walang Tulugan with the Master Showman (2014)
- Born: February 16, 1980 (age 46); Manila, Philippines
- Other name: Sharmaine Santiago
- Education: Centro Escolar University (Broadcasting)
- Occupations: Actress; TV show host; singer
- Years active: 1999–present
- Known for: Walang Tulugan with the Master Showman

Shermaine Santiago (born February 16, 1980, in Manila, Philippines) is a Filipino actress, TV show host, and singer. She appeared in a lot of hit TV shows from GMA Network such as Best Friends, Beh Bote Nga, Te Amo, Maging Sino Ka Man, Mulawin, Impostora, MariMar, Paroa: Ang Kuwento ni Mariposa, Anna KareNina and Carmela. She was also a co-host in the longest-running late-night variety TV show in the Philippines, Walang Tulugan with the Master Showman in which she showcase her talent in singing and hosting. Along with German Moreno and John Nite, she was one of the longest-serving hosts of the show. Santiago is also currently appearing in the hit TV show, Kapag Nahati ang Puso.

== Career ==
A graduating Broadcasting major in Centro Escolar University, Santiago started singing in hotels and doing lounge performances at the age 16. Around the same time, she appeared in various commercials and decided to try the show business. She auditioned for GMA Network and GMA Network made her sign an exclusive six-month contract. She was given guesting projects in different drama shows and a regular role on the youth-oriented variety show Best Friends. She later appeared in the comedy sitcom Beh Bote Nga.

In 2012, Santiago got her breakthrough role in the drama-fantasy TV show, Paroa: Ang Kuwento ni Mariposa, where she portrayed the villainous femme fatale butterfly Talisay. Her character was killed in a massive explosion in the sky. According to her fellow Walang Tulugan co-host, John Nite, the ratings of the show got higher when Santiago and the host of Walang Tulugan German Moreno started appearing in the show.

In 2013, for her 32nd birthday, she performed Adele's song "Someone Like You" on Walang Tulugan with the Master Showman and received a standing ovation from the audience.

== Personal life ==
Santiago has a son, Tristan Reese M. Eugenio. Her son was baptized by Fr. Steve Tyran at the St. Benedict Church in Don Antonio Heights in Quezon City.

== Filmography ==
=== Television ===
| Year | Title | Role |
|---|---|---|
| 1999–2016 | Walang Tulugan with the Master Showman | Herself/Host |
| 1999 | Best Friends | Herself |
| 1999–2003 | Beh Bote Nga | Celine |
| 2003 | Ang Iibigin Ay Ikaw Pa Rin | Mayumi |
| 2004 | Te Amo, Maging Sino Ka Man | Marie |
| 2004 | 30 Days | Herself/Contestant |
| 2004–05 | Mulawin | Oyayi (Taguba) |
| 2007 | Impostora | Carla |
| 2007 | MariMar | Brenda Guillermo |
| 2011 | Iglot | Idang |
| 2012 | Maynila | |
| 2012 | Enchanted Garden | |
| 2012–13 | Cielo de Angelina | |
| 2012–13 | Paroa: Ang Kuwento ni Mariposa | Talisay |
| 2013–2016 | 50 Years with the Master Showman | Herself/Host |
| 2013 | Magpakailanman: The Elsa De Guzman Story | Dr. Sharon |
| 2013 | Home Sweet Home | Dessa Buena |
| 2013 | Pepito Manaloto: Ang Tunay na Buhay | |
| 2013 | Magpakailanman: Hinagpis ng Isang Ina | Flora |
| 2013 | Anna Karenina | Glenda |
| 2013 | Maynila: Heart of Trust | |
| 2014 | Carmela | Lily Suarez |
| 2014 | MARS | Herself/Guest |
| 2014 | Yagit | Ethel Santos |
| 2015 | Healing Hearts | Nimfa's friend |
| 2015 | Mars | Herself/Guest |
| 2015 | Because of You | Clarisse |
| 2016 | Master Showman's The Final Bow | Herself/Presenter |
| 2016 | Magpakailanman: Ang Kriminal na Binuhay ng Diyos | Sonia Agustin |
| 2016 | Hanggang Makita Kang Muli | Jelly |
| 2016 | Maynila: Single Dad | |
| 2016 | Sa Piling ni Nanay | Joy Villegas |
| 2017 | Magpakailanman: Justice for the Battered Child | Pearl |
| 2017 | Mulawin vs. Ravena | Maningning |
| 2017 | Daig Kayo ng Lola Ko | Tita Coring |
| 2017 | Magpakailanman: My Breastfeeding Dad | Luding |
| 2018 | Super Ma'am | Linda |
| 2018 | Kapag Nahati ang Puso | Jasmine |
| 2018 | Tadhana | |
| 2018 | Contessa | Fortune teller |
| 2018 | Onanay | Marie Chu |
| 2019 | Dragon Lady | Gigi |
| 2019 | Love You Two | Jean |
| 2019 | The Gift | Bank teller |
| 2020 | Magkaagaw | Ryzza |
| 2020-2021 | Anak ni Waray vs. Anak ni Biday | Lucy |
| 2021 | Stories from the Heart: Never Say Goodbye | Dr. Darla Delos Reyes |
| 2022 | Agimat ng Agila (season 2) | Carol Llamanzares |
| 2022 | Mano Po Legacy: Her Big Boss | Elise Ty |
| 2022 | Regal Studio Presents: Mind the Gap | Carissa |
| 2022 | Wish Ko Lang!: Utangera | Malou |
| 2022 | Unica Hija | Gracia "Mama G" Garcia |
| 2024 | Black Rider | Tiyang Manda |
| 2024–2025 | Lilet Matias: Attorney-at-Law | Leilani "Lani" Baldivino-Matias |
| 2024 | Wish Ko Lang!: Valedictorian | Mildred Montecillo |
| 2025 | My Ilonggo Girl | Shermaine |

=== Films ===
| Year | Title | Role |
|---|---|---|
| 1995 | Isang Kahig, Isang Tuka | |
| 2000 | Kailangan Ko'y Ikaw | Mayumi |
| 2000 | Biyaheng Langit | Amanda |
| 2000 | Bakit Ba Ganyan? | |
| 2000 | Abandonada | Cindy's friend |
| 2001 | Radyo | Joan |
| 2001 | Dugong Aso: Mabuting Kaibigan, Masamang Kaaway | |
| 2005 | D'Anothers | Ghost |
| 2022 | Day Zero | Frida |
| 2023 | Pinoy Ghost Tales | Josie |

=== Theatre ===
| Year | Title | Role |
|---|---|---|
| 2010 | El Filibusterismo & Noli Me Tangere | Maria Clara |
