= Teresa (2025 film) =

2005 Philippine drama short film

- Directed by: Paulo Xavier
- Written by: Paulo Xavier
- Produced by: WWvK; KidsRights; State of Youth; Elia Ilano
- Edited by: Dave Ramirez
- Music by: Jerecho Sanchez Nesperos
- Distributed by: SOY MNL Productions
- Release date: 2025
- Country: Philippines
- Language: Filipino

Teresa is a 2025 Philippine Philippine drama short film directed by Paulo Xavier and starred Elia Ilano. State of Youth Manila's Teresa short film project was selected and funded by the International Children's Peace Prize through its Theme Fund Project Initiative.

== Plot ==
In a world where dreams are often limited by poverty and prejudice, a Grade 10 student from a struggling neighborhood, dares to dream of becoming an engineer. Gifted and passionate about science, she battles the weight of gender stereotypes especially from her traditional teacher, Mr. Reyes, who insists engineering is a man’s world. Inspired and undeterred, she begins forging her path with determination, sketching designs by candlelight and challenging the very beliefs that sought to hold her back.

== Cast ==
- Elia Ilano as Teresa Advincula
- Bodjie Pascua as Principal Cruz
- Ataska Mercado as Ms. Joan Alvarez
- Symon de Leña as Carlo
- Malou Canzana as Mila
- Richard Ubalde as Mr. Reyes
- Vinz Aceremo as Harry
- Romulo Gonzaga Jr. as Raphael
- Cath Daymoto as Mae
- Lyka Pepito as Jessica

== Production ==
This short film from State of Youth Manila (SOY MNL Productions) was selected for funding through the International Children’s Peace Prize Project Fund. Teresa is tackling gender inequality at the grassroots level. This short film has its premiere last September 2025 at select local cinemas and schools in the Philippines.

== Accolades ==
Year	Award ceremony	Category	Recipient(s)	Result	Ref
2025	Campinas International Film Festival Brazil	Best Director	Paulo Xavier	Won	
2025	Campinas International Film Festival Brazil	Best Actress	Elia Ilano	Won	
2025	Campinas International Film Festival Brazil	Best International Short Film (Honorable Mention)	Teresa	Won	
2025	Seven Colors Australian Film Festival (SCAFF) Australia	Official Selection	Teresa	Selected	
2025	Tampok Film Festival 2025	3rd Best Picture and Audience Choice Award	Teresa	Won	
2025	Amader International Short Film Festival 2026 (Kolkata, India)	Official Selection	Teresa	Selected	
2026	Amader International Short Film Festival 2026 (Kolkata, India)	Best Director	Paulo Xavier	Won	
2026	Amader International Short Film Festival 2026 (Kolkata, India)	Best Actress	Elia Ilano	Won	
2026	Amader International Short Film Festival 2026 (Kolkata, India)	Best Drama Film	Teresa	Won	
2026	Amader International Short Film Festival 2026 (Kolkata, India)	Best Actor	Symon de Lena	Won	
2026	6th Spiny Babbler International Film Festival 2026 Bangladesh	Best International short Film Motivational Director	Paulo Xavier	Won	
2026	6th Spiny Babbler International Film Festival 2026 Bangladesh	Best International short Film Director of Photography	Dave Ramirez	Won	
