= Because of You (Philippine TV series) =

Philippine television drama series

- Title card
- Genre: Drama; Romantic comedy
- Created by: Dode Cruz
- Written by: Dode Cruz; Christine Novicio; Geng Delgado; Marlon Miguel
- Directed by: Mark A. Reyes V; Ricky Davao
- Creative director: Roy Iglesias
- Starring: Carla Abellana; Rafael Rosell; Gabby Concepcion
- Theme music composer: Decky Jazer Margaja
- Opening theme: "You and Me" by Julie Anne San Jose and Christian Bautista
- Country of origin: Philippines
- Original language: Tagalog
- No. of episodes: 117 (list of episodes)

Production
- Executive producer: Nieva M. Sabit
- Producer: Shielyn Atienza
- Production locations: Manila, Philippines; San Isidro, Nueva Ecija, Philippines
- Cinematography: Rhino Vidanes
- Editors: Debbie Robete; Nikka Olayvar-Unson; Ron Joss Suñer
- Camera setup: Multiple-camera setup
- Running time: 26–42 minutes
- Production company: GMA Entertainment TV

Original release
- Network: GMA Network
- Release: November 30, 2015 – May 13, 2016

Because of You is a Philippine television drama romantic comedy series broadcast by GMA Network. Directed by Mark A. Reyes V and Ricky Davao, it stars Carla Abellana, Rafael Rosell and Gabby Concepcion. It premiered on November 30, 2015, on the network's Telebabad line up. The series concluded on May 13, 2016, with a total of 117 episodes.

The series is streaming online on YouTube.

== Premise ==
When Oliver left the altar when he and Andrea were about to marry each other, Andrea's life takes a turn. While Jaime's wife breaks up with him, the lives of Andrea and Jaime eventually cross path, and their work and family begin to intertwine into their relationship.

== Cast and characters ==
Cast

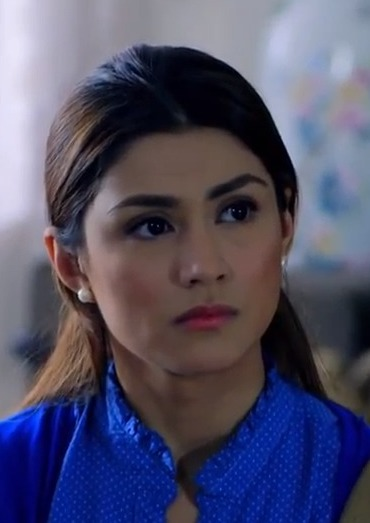
Carla Abellana

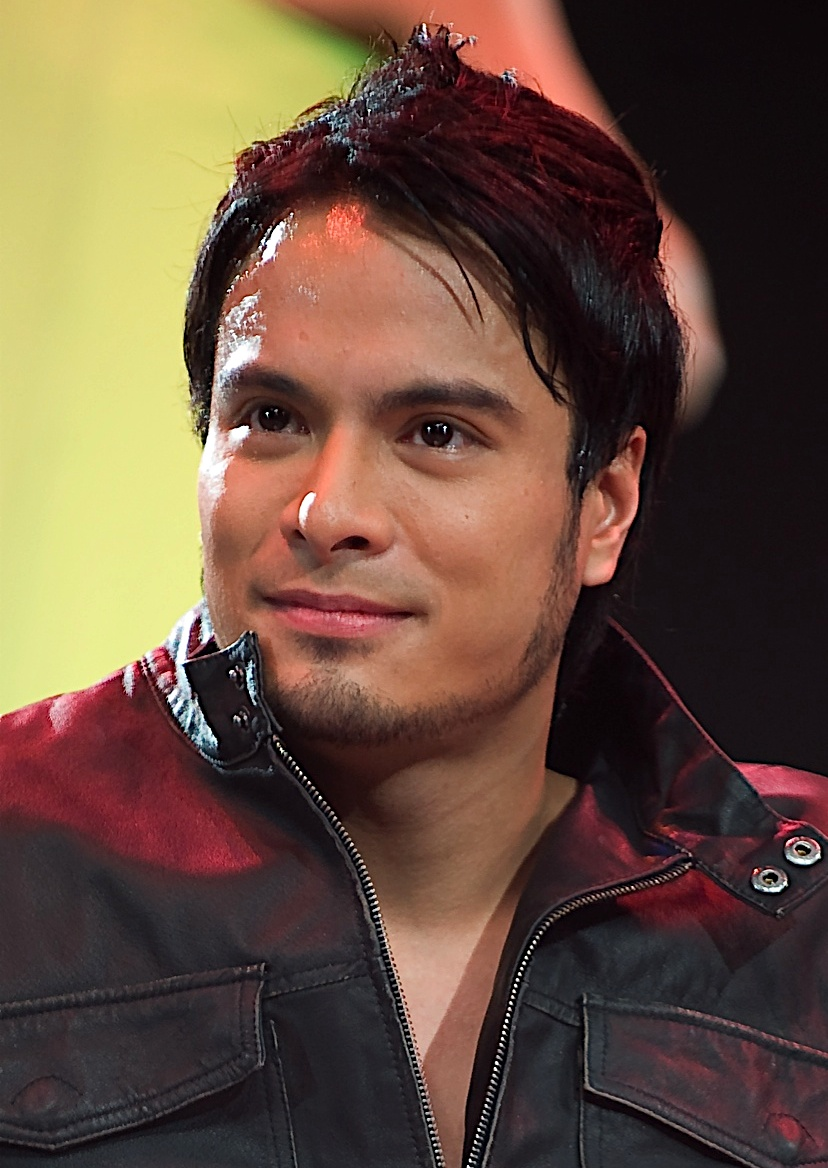
Rafael Rosell

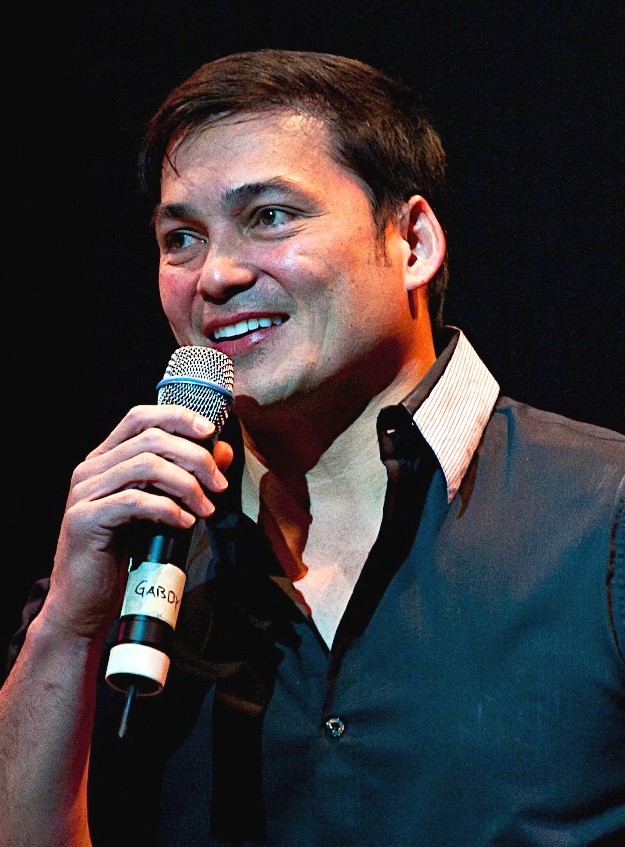
Gabby Concepcion

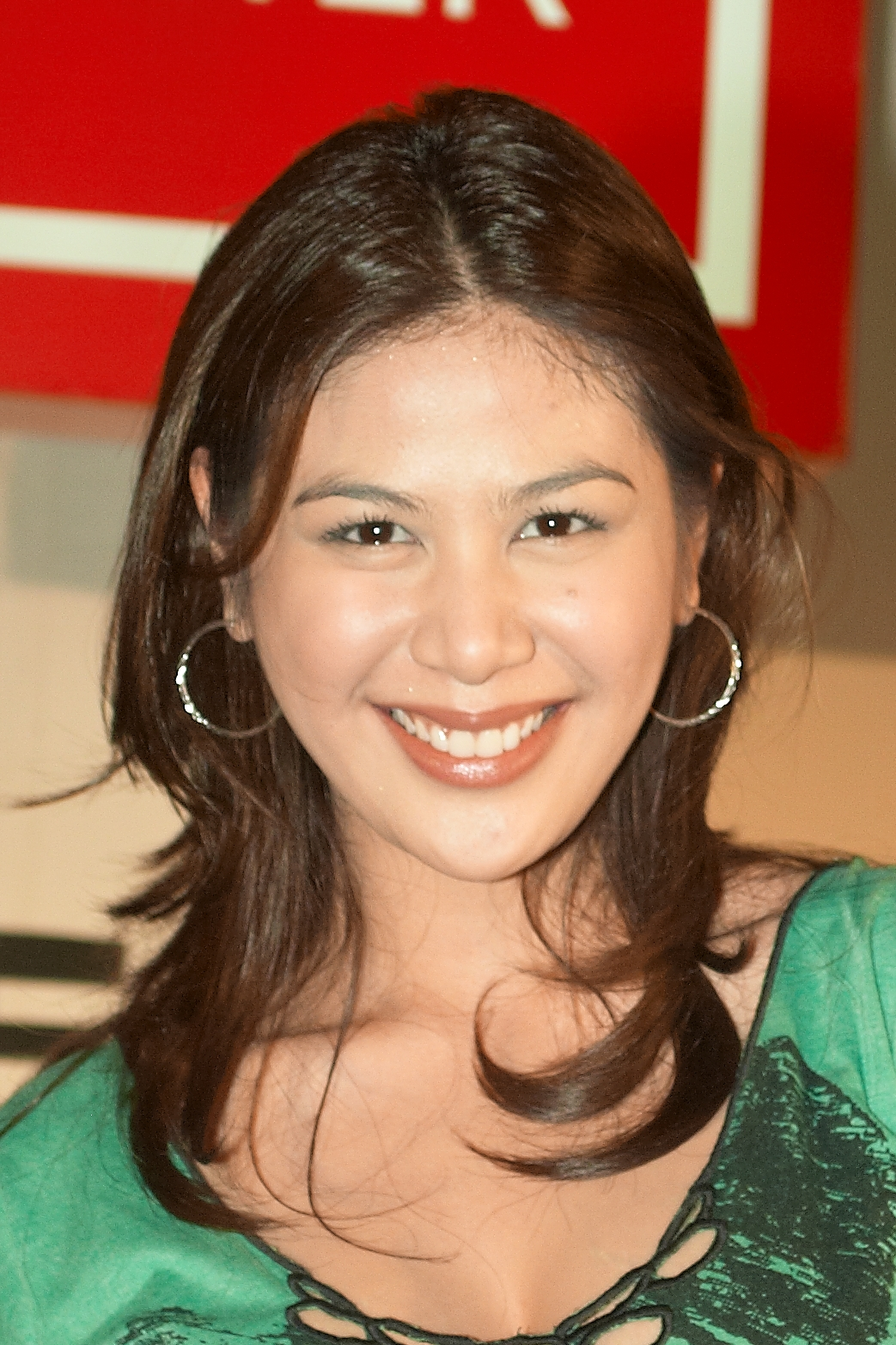
Valerie Concepcion

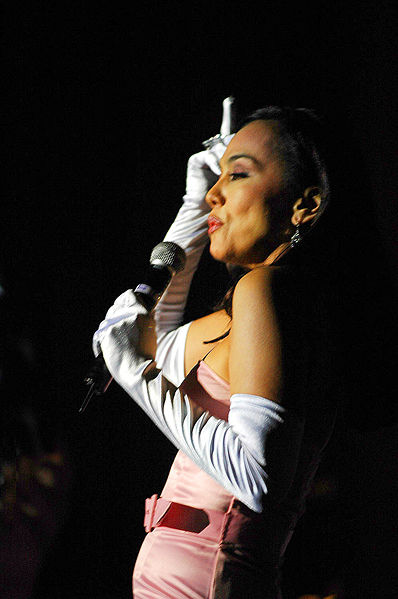
Kuh Ledesma

Lead cast

- Carla Abellana as Andrea "Andi" Marquez-Salcedo
- Rafael Rosell as Oliver Dictado
- Gabby Concepcion as Jaime Salcedo

Supporting cast

- Kuh Ledesma as Charina Santiago
- Iya Villania as Maria Rebecca "Becca" Reyes
- Valerie Concepcion as Veronica Sodico-Salcedo
- Joyce Ching as Francheska "Cheska" Sodico Salcedo
- Bettina Carlos as Patricia Sanchez
- Enzo Pineda as Sonny Lacson
- Vaness del Moral as Alexandra "Alex" Tamayo
- Michael Flores as Dennis Dela Peña
- Rey "PJ" Abellana as Conrado Marquez
- Carlo Gonzales as Henry
- Julius Escarga as Michael Sodico Salcedo
- Sofia Pablo as Candy Sodico Salcedo
- Jacob Briz as Iñigo Sodico Salcedo
- Celia Rodriguez as Feliza Salcedo

Recurring cast

- Eunice Lagusad as Iska Larrazabal
- Mosang as Malou
- Shermaine Santiago as Clarisse
- Betong Sumaya as Albert
- Jackie Lou Blanco as Lucille Rodriguez
- Avery Paraiso as Chandler Rodriguez
- Kristoffer Martin as Jonathan "Onat" Larrazabal / Nate
- Maey Bautista as Honey
- Oli Espino as Mang Nestor
- Frencheska Farr as Molly
- Lance Serrano as Randy
- Maureen Larrazabal as Love Co

Guest cast

- Mickey Ferriols as Mildred Samaniego / Margaret
- Arny Ross as Lizzy Torres
- Leni Santos as Marissa

== Production ==
Principal photography commenced in October 2015. Filming concluded in April 2016.

== Ratings ==
According to AGB Nielsen Philippines' Mega Manila household television ratings, the pilot episode of Because of You earned a 19.8% rating. The final episode scored a 19.6% rating.

== Accolades ==
Accolades received by Because of You
Year	Award	Category	Recipient	Result	Ref.
2021	7th Face of the Year Awards	Most Favorite Foreign Drama	Because of You	Won	
2021	7th Face of the Year Awards	Most Favorite Foreign Actress	Carla Abellana	Won	
2021	7th Face of the Year Awards	Most Favorite Foreign Actor	Rafael Rosell	Won	
