= Elia Ilano =

Filipino actress (born 2010)

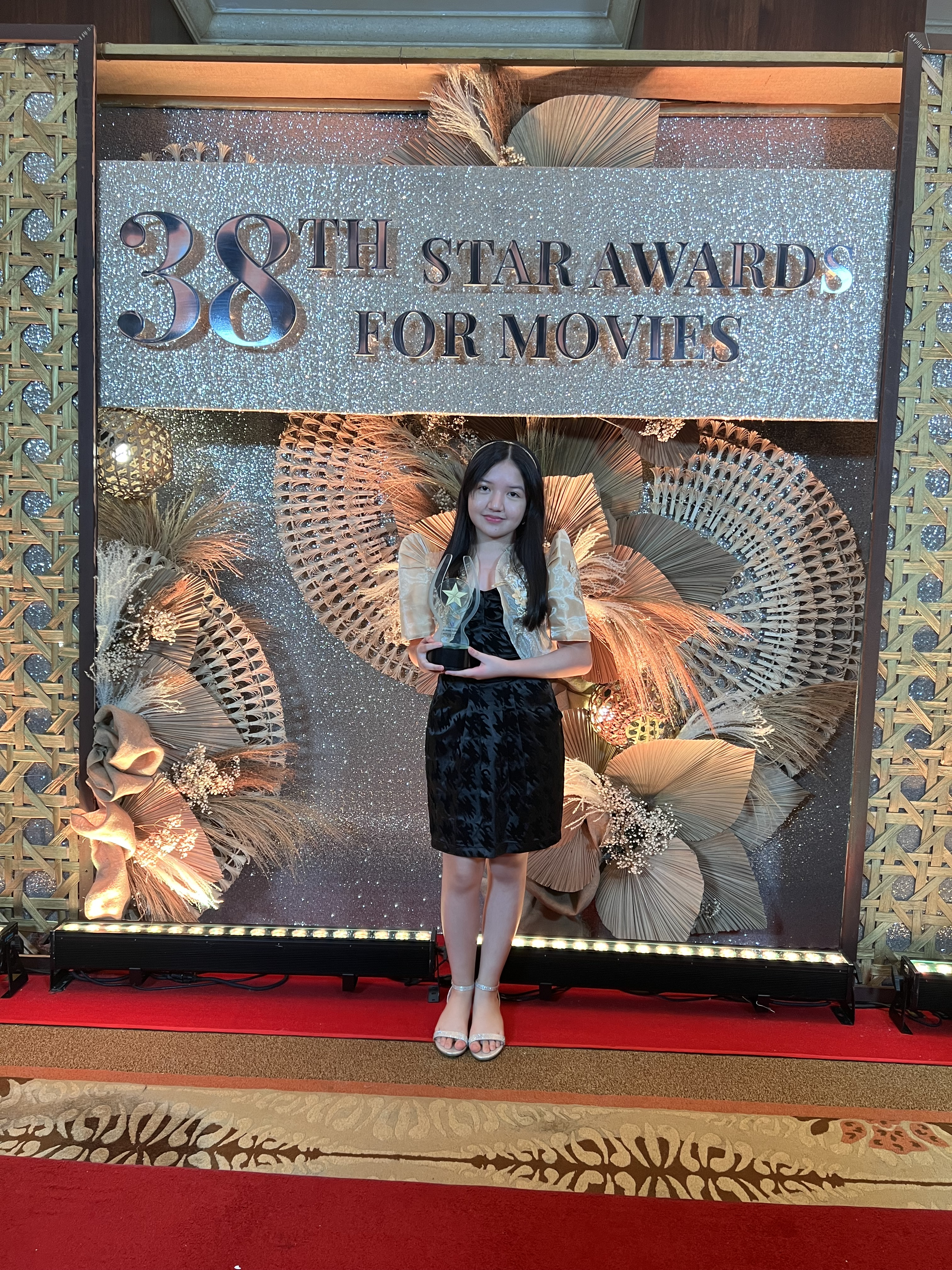
- Born: Elia Maria Norelle Ilano; March 24, 2010 (age 16); Marikina, Philippines
- Occupations: Actress; television personality; singer; youth leader; humanitarian
- Years active: 2015–present
- Agent: Viva Artists Agency (2015–2025)
- Notable work: La Luna Sangre Ningning

Elia Maria Norelle "Elia" Ilano (born 24 March 2010) is a Filipino TV, movie and theater actress, TV host and an international non-profit organization Youth Leader for State of Youth by KidsRights Foundation where she became the youngest chapter leader in the world. She is labelled as a "Future Super Actress" by the Filipino-American Community Newspaper, Asian Journal.

She began her acting career as a child actress and became known for her performances in a variety of television shows and movie genres. She rose to fame for playing the young Nadine Lustre in Ulan and as Ningning in La Luna Sangre.

Coveted Asia, a premier digital media platform and the home of Asia’s most coveted rankings, lists, and recognitions, named her as “Asia’s Multifaceted Star” and included her in its “Next Generation of Stars: Asian Rising Talents” list.

She has received numerous accolades, including a FAMAS Award, a PMPC Star Awards for Movies, a Campinas International Film Festival Best Actress award at Brazil, an Amader International Short Film Festival Best Actress award at India including two nominations from Aliw Awards.

She is also a short story writer and poet whose works were published through The Department of Human and Family Development Studies' (DHFDS) Tsikiting Stories Samut Saring Kwento Volume 3.

== Early life and background ==
Elia Maria Norelle Ilano was born on March 24, 2010, in Marikina City, to Sheng Ilano and Paulo Xavier Ilano.

In April 2026, Ilano completed junior high school at NCD Integrated School Inc. with flying colors.

== Career ==
=== 2015-2017: Early career and breakout ===
She started with small roles in television series such as The 700 Club.

In 2016, she made her primetime television debut as Gigi in Ang Probinsyano.

In 2017, she was part of the main cast of Viva Cinema's (formerly Viva TV) very first original TV series, "Oh My Guardians!" as Ela (The White Guardian). Her notable performance as Young Ningning in the hit TV series La Luna Sangre marked her rise to fame allowing her to be a guest celebrity/performer in top-rated shows such as ASAP (TV program) and Gandang Gabi, Vice!.

=== 2018-2021: Established child star ===
During this period, she appeared in major films like the top-grosser film Ulan (film) (2019) and the award-winning thriller The Housemaid (2021). Elia played the young version of Nadine Lustre’s character in Ulan which was screened at the San Diego Asian Film Festival in the United States and premiered at the prestigious Copenhagen Asian Film Festival 2020.. While in The Housemaid (2021), which is the first Filipino film to be shown in the theaters of the United Arab Emirates and Europe since the pandemic started, she played the role of "Nami" that gained praises from the press and recognition from the viewing public.

She was a mainstay in the daytime television show Sana Dalawa ang Puso as Tamarra "Tamtam" Tabayoyong where she won a recognition from RAWR Awards. The award clearly indicates being active or maybe the brightest child star the public has come to endear with.

Elia won back-to-back "Bibo of the Year" awards which is the best child artist through the combined public vote, online presence and metrics from LionhearTV, Dailypedia, and PH Entertainment, and a pool of bloggers, PR practitioners, and brand partners at the LionheartTV RAWR Awards in 2018 and 2019 that solidified her status as a child star in the Philippine entertainment industry.

=== 2022-2024: Award-winning years and theater musical and hosting breakthrough ===
Elia took on more breakthrough and challenging roles, such as Young Lyra in the techno-horror film Deleter (2022).

Her role in Pinoy Ghost Tales (2023) earned her the Best Child Actress trophy at the 2024 FAMAS Awards, Gawad Dangal Filipino Awards and 2nd Dangal ng Lahing Filipino Awards.

In October 2023, she was nominated for the International Children's Peace Prize for her work as a youth leader focusing on Youth Development and Welfare with KidsRights Foundation.

In November 2023, Elia portrayed the younger version of Nadine Lustre in the Amazon Prime Video miniseries Roadkillers. This role marked her third time, following Ulan (film) and Deleter, playing Nadine’s younger counterpart.

In 2024, her portrayal of "Malena" in SM Supermalls' 5th Sine Sindak Film Festival, Nanay Tatay movie, earned her two acting awards: Best Child Performer and Best Child Actress at the Rising Filipino Awards and the 13th OFW Gawad Parangal, respectively. In the same year, Elia joined the main hosting team of the Artsy Craftsy program on the People's Television Network. The show is an informative, Anak TV Seal Awards awardee series that focuses on arts, crafts, and educational trivia for young audiences.

For its November 2024 issue, Bisaya Magasin, published by Manila Bulletin Publishing Corporation, featured her as its cover girl, marking Elia’s first national magazine cover in the Philippines.

She starred as the lead in Maria Goretti: The Musical by the National Mobile Theater Company of the Philippines, Philstagers Foundation. This performance earned her a nomination for Best Child Performer (Female Category) at the 37th Aliw Awards. US-based writer and producer, Barbara Oleynick, with nearly 25 years of productions in the United States and the Dominican Republic, brought The Miracle of Fatima: The Musical in the Philippines where Elia portrayed one of the lead roles, Lucia dos Santos.

=== 2025-present: Transition to teen roles and international recognition in acting ===
Now transitioning into teen actress territory, she starred as Theresita Agbayani in the Viva One series I Love You Since 1892 (2025).

She continued to receive acting awards in 2025 from multiple awarding giving bodies here in the Philippines for her role as Malena in Nanay Tatay. In total, she won three awards from prestigious organizations for the said movie: the 4th Primetime Media Choice Awards, the World Icon of Excellence and Leadership Awards, and the 2025 Manila Film Critics Circle Awards.

In same year, her acting skills received international recognition by winning two Best Actress awards in international film festivals: first at the 5th Campinas International Film Festival held in Brazil, and second at the 2025 Amader International Short Film Festival in India, for her lead role in Teresa (2025 film) who is a young girl from an underprivileged community who dreams of becoming an engineer.

In early 2026, she was named "Distinct Teenage Actress of the Year" by the Philippines Distinct Men and Women Excellence Awards.

In June 2026, she took the lead in an internationally produced film "Violet" which is a powerful movie about a 15-year-old girl navigating a difficult domestic situation. The following month, she was selected as one of the official cast members of Philstagers Foundation's musical theater production, "Rizal 3000," which is set for a nationwide tour, staging performances in various parts of the Philippines.

In August 2026, Elia has graced the inside pages of the oldest and leading Tagalog weekly magazine in the Philippines established in 1922, Liwayway Magazine under Manila Bulletin for its Buwan ng Wika Issue as its featured model.

In September 2026, Coveted Asia, a premier digital media platform and the home of Asia’s most coveted rankings, lists, and recognitions, named her as “Asia’s Multifaceted Star” and included her in its “Next Generation of Stars: Asian Rising Talents” list.

== Filmography ==
=== Film ===
Year	Title	Role
2016	Higanti	Young Jean
2018	Distance	Young Therese
2019	Ulan	Young Maya
2019	Mina-Anud	Grace
2020	You With Me	Chi Chi
2021	The Housemaid	Nami
2022	Ang Babaeng Nawawala sa sarili	Young Albina
2022	Deleter	Young Lyra
2023	Mary Cherry Chua	Student
2023	Pinoy Ghost Tales	Lea
2024	Nanay Tatay	Malena
2025	Arapaap	Young Sarah
2025	Magkapatid, Dreamers in Tandem	Christina delos Santos
2025	Teresa (2025 film)	Teresa Agbayani
2026	Violet (2026 short film)	Violet

=== Television/web series ===
Year	Title	Role
2015	The 700 Club	Young Amparo Magallanes
2016	Ang Probinsyano	Gigi
2016	Langit Lupa	Young Corazon/Heart
2016	The 700 Club	Young Teresa Pastera
2017	Maalala Mo Kaya: Mansanas at Juice	Young Kathy
2017	Ipaglaban Mo: Lihim	Young Letlet
2017	Gandang Gabi, Vice	Herself/Guest with La Luna Sangre Kids
2017	La Luna Sangre	Young Ningning
2017	ASAP	Herself/Guest Performer
2017	Oh My Guardians	Ela
2018	Sana Dalawa ang Puso	Tamtam Tabayoyong
2019	Maalaala Mo Kaya: Rattle	Young Anna
2019	Love You Two	Yumi Batungbakal
2019	Ghost Adventures	Gab-Gab
2019	Mars	Herself/Guest
2020	Unconditional	Young Agnes Martinez
2022	Abot-Kamay na Pangarap	Young Grace Villar
2023	Roadkillers	Young Stacey
2024	Rise and Shine Pilipinas	Herself/Guest
2024	Chasing in the Wild	Sofia Camero
2024–present	Artsy Craftsy	Herself/Host
2025	I Love You Since 1892	Theresita

=== Theater ===
Year	Title	Role	Producer
2024	Maria Goretti The Musical	Maria Goretti	Philippine Stagers Foundation
2024	The Miracle of Fatima The Musical	Lucia dos Santos	The Miracle of Fatima Foundation Inc. USA
2026	Rizal 3000	Eden Zaragoza	Philippine Stagers Foundation

== Awards and honors ==
Award ceremony	Year	Category	Nominee(s)/work(s)	Result	Ref
LionheartTV Rawr Awards	2018	Bibo of the Year	Sana Dalawa ang Puso	Won	
9th OFW Gawad Parangal	2019	Most Promising Child Actress		Won	
LionheartTV Rawr Awards	2019	Bibo of the Year	Ulan (film)	Won	
PMPC Star Awards for Movies	2021	Best Child Performer	Ulan (film)	Nominated	
PMPC Star Awards for Movies	2023	Best Child Performer	The Housemaid	Won	
International Children's Peace Prize	2023		Youth Development and Welfare Category	Nominated	
FAMAS Award	2024	Best Child Actress	Pinoy Ghost Tales	Won	
Gawad Dangal Filipino Awards	2024	Best Child Actress of the Year	Pinoy Ghost Tales	Won	
2nd Dangal ng Lahing Filipino Awards	2024	Most Outstanding Child Actress of the Year	Pinoy Ghost Tales	Won	
PMPC Star Awards for Movies	2024	Best Child Performer	Deleter	Nominated	
Rising Filipino Awards	2024	Best Child Performer	Nanay Tatay	Won	
7th Gawad Lasallianeta	2024	Most Outstanding Educational Show Host	Artsy Craftsy	Nominated	
37th Aliw Awards	2024	Best Child Performer (Female)	Maria Goretti the Musical	Nominated	
13th OFW Gawad Parangal	2024	Best Child Actress	Nanay Tatay	Won	
4th Primetime Media Choice Awards	2025	Best Child Actress	Nanay Tatay	Won	
PMPC Star Awards for Television	2025	Best Children Show Host	Artsy Craftsy	Nominated	
Philippine Faces of Success 2025 (2nd Young Faces of Success)	2025	Official Awardee	For outstanding contribution as a TV, Movie, Stage Actress and TV Host	Won	
World Icon of Excellence and Leadership Awards	2025	Best Child Actress	Nanay Tatay	Won	
Asia Pacific Topnotch Men and Women Achievers Award 2025	2025	Teen Actress of the Year		Won	
2025 Gawad Parangal sa mga Natatanging Propesyonal	2025	Gawad Parangal sa Natatanging Propesyonal sa Larangan ng Sining at Pagtatanghal		Won	
Asia Diamond Elite Awards 2025	2025	Cultural Beacon Award for Transformative Roles in Film, Stage, and Youth Television		Won	
Manila Film Critics Circle Awards	2025	Breakthrough Performance Award	Nanay Tatay	Won	
3rd Dangal ng Lahing Filipino Awards	2025	Lifetime Achievement Award for Best Child Actress		Won	
2025 Net Makabata Award	2025	Star Awardee	Artsy Craftsy	Nominated	
8th Gawad Lasallianeta	2025	Most Outstanding Educational and Youth Oriented Show Hosts (with Joseph Ancheta and Nicollo Cholo)	Artsy Craftsy	Nominated	
38th Aliw Awards	2025	Best New Artist (Female)		Nominated	
5th Campinas International Film Festival (Brazil)	2025	Best Actress	Teresa (2025 film)	Won	
Philippine Fashion Trends 2025	2025	Asia's Most Iconic Award-Winning Young Actress of the Year		Won	
7th VP Choice Awards	2025	Female Face of the Year (Teen Category)		Nominated	
3rd Philippines Distinct Men and Women of Excellence Awards	2026	Distinct Teenage Actress of the Year		Won	
1st PAFTA Awards	2026	Best Child Actress	Nanay Tatay	Won	
Amader International Short Film Festival 2026 (Kolkata, India)	2026	Best Actress	Teresa (2025 film)	Won	
Asia Pacific Topnotch Men and Women Achievers Award 2026	2026	Young Actress of the Year		Won	
4th Gawad Dangal Filipino Awards	2026	Outstanding Performer of the Year		Won	
Lionheartv RAWR Awards 2026	2026	Beshie ng Taon (Best Supporting Actress)	I Love You Since 1892	TBA	
2nd FAMAS Award Short Film Festival	2026	Best Child Performer	Violet	TBA	
