= Junix Inocian =

Filipino actor (1951–2015)

- Born: Rufino Duran Inocian, Jr. March 17, 1951; Iligan, Lanao del Norte, Philippines
- Died: June 13, 2015 (aged 64); London, United Kingdom
- Education: Silliman University
- Occupations: Actor, comedian

Junix Inocian (born Rufino Duran Inocian, Jr.; March 17, 1951 – June 13, 2015) was a Filipino actor and comedian. He starred in various plays, such as Miss Saigon, Fiddler on the Roof, the film version of the Swedish crime novel Tatuerad Torso, and Sinbad. On television, he was best known for the iconic role of "Kuya Mario" on the Children's educational TV program Batibot.

== Personal life ==
Inocian was born Rufino Duran Inocian, Jr. in Iligan City, Philippines, on March 17, 1951. He graduated from Silliman University in Dumaguete, where he obtained a degree in Theater Arts and underwent further studies in the University of Michigan, where he obtained a degree in acting in 1978.

== Later career ==
Inocian trained with Mary Hutchinson, an acting coach from Syracuse University, New York, and with Paul Palmore, an acting coach from the University of Michigan. Subsequent to his studies in the United States, Inocian joined Repertory Philippines, where he starred in at least 60 productions.

=== Stage appearances ===
Inocian's stage appearances include leading roles in Little Shop of Horrors, as Audrey II; Mass Appeal, as Father Tim Farley; Man of La Mancha, as Sancho Panza; The Government Inspector, as the Mayor; The Pirates of Penzance, as Major-General Stanley; A Funny Thing Happened on the Way to the Forum, as Pseudolus; Fiddler On The Roof, as Tevye; Sweeney Todd the Demon Barber of Fleet Street, as Sweeney Todd, and Children of a Lesser God, as James Leeds.

Inocian joined the original cast of Miss Saigon, in which he portrayed the Engineer from 1992 to 1994. Sometime after portraying Old Deuteronomy in Cats at the New London Theatre, Inocian returned to Miss Saigon.

=== Film and television ===
On television, Inocian appeared in various series, such as Sesame! (later retitled Batibot), Sitak ni Jack (Jack's Taxicab), a top-rated sitcom, and A Dangerous Life, a 6-hour mini-series based on the 1986 People Power Revolution in the Philippines. He also starred in films, such as Silk and Greed, and appeared as the ship's cook in Sky1's version of Sinbad.

== Death ==
On June 13, 2015, Inocian was found dead by his associates at his flat in London, after failing to appear at a film shoot. As of 2015, the cause of his death has not been determined.

== Filmography ==
=== Television ===
- Sesame!/Batibot as Kuya Mario
- A Dangerous Life
- PG: Parents Guide
- Sinbad
- Sic O'Clock News
- Arabian Nights (2000) as Hi-Ching

=== Film ===
- Hati Tayo sa Magdamag (1988) – Mr. Diwa
- Faust: Love of the Damned (2000) - Dr. Yuri Yamoto
- Mortdecai (2015) – Fang Fat

== Video games ==
- Late Shift
