= Magkapatid, Dreamers in Tandem =

2025 Philippine drama film

- Theatrical release poster
- Directed by: Jonathan S. Oraño
- Screenplay by: Lawrence Nicodemus
- Produced by: Engr. Jerome Lisay
- Starring: Elia Ilano; Adrian Cabido; Marnie Lapus; Dennah Bautista
- Cinematography: Nelson Villamayor
- Edited by: Nelson Villamayor
- Production company: JPhlix Films
- Distributed by: JPhlix Films
- Release date: July 23, 2025
- Country: Philippines
- Language: Filipino

Magkapatid, Dreamers in Tandem (lit. 'Siblings, Dreamers in Tandem') is a Philippine drama film directed by Jonathan S. Oraño from a screenplay by Lawrence Nicodemus. It stars 2024 FAMAS Best Child Actress Elia Ilano, 2014 FAMAS Best Child Performer, Adrian Cabido, Marnie Lapus and Dennah Bautista. The film is the first full-length movie of JPhlix Films.

== Synopsis ==
Christina, a bright girl with a physical disability, and her brother Christian, an athletic young man with intellectual challenges, share a dream of completing their education to build a better future. Along the way, they must overcome bullying, family struggles, and personal battles that threaten to hold them back. But together, they face every obstacle with determination, proving that courage and resilience can defy all odds.

== Premise ==
Two siblings, one with physical disability, other one with intellectual challenges facing struggles and trials in school and in home while pursuing to attain good education. Along the struggles, they inspire others.

== Cast ==
- Elia Ilano as Christina delos Santos
- Adrian Cabido as Christian delos Santos
- Marnie Lapus as Tiyang Annie
- Dennah Baustista as Analyn

== Production ==
The film was shot in the busy streets of Balut, Tondo, Manila while the school scenes were filmed at Raja Soliman Science High School. Jerome Lisay's passion for filmmaking has led him to establish JPhlix Films making Magkapatid, dreamers in tandem, its first full-length movie.

== Accolades ==
Award ceremony	Year	Category	Artist	Result	Ref
21st LaSallian Scholarium Awards	2026	Outstanding Youth and Education Feature Film		Nominated	
