= Pinoy Ghost Tales =

2023 pinoy horror film

- Theatrical released poster
- Directed by: Afi Africa (segment "The Actress"); Jojo Nadela (segment "The Imaginary Friend"); John Isaac Natividad (segment "The Manager")
- Screenplay by: Lawrence Nicodemus
- Produced by: Mhayen Gatmaitan-Basto (segment "The Actress"); Precious Aleyah Magdrigal (segment "The Manager"); Baby Rofiles (segment "The Imaginary Friend")
- Starring: Jeric Raval; AJ Raval; DJ Durano; Rob Sy; Ping Medina; Elia Ilano
- Cinematography: Marlon Hayag (segment "The Imaginary Friend"), (segment "The Manager"); Emman Lawanas (segment "The Actress")
- Music by: Jethro Ilagan
- Production companies: LGM Grand Entertainment; LMK Films
- Distributed by: iWantTFC
- Release date: October 22, 2023
- Running time: 85 minutes
- Country: Philippines
- Language: Filipino

Pinoy Ghost Tales (also known as Ghost Tales) is a 2023 Philippine independent horror anthology film. It is written by Lawrence Nicodemus and directed by Afi Africa, Jojo Nadela and John Isaac Natividad. It stars Jeric Raval, AJ Raval, DJ Durano, Elia Ilano, Rob Sy and Ping Medina. The film is inspired by the Philippine horror anthology film series Shake, Rattle & Roll.

== Plot ==
=== "The Imaginary Friend" ===
In a quiet rural town, young Lea begins to interact with an unseen entity she calls her “imaginary friend.” At first, her parents, Josie and Fernando, dismiss it as a harmless phase. However, as Lea's behavior becomes increasingly erratic and violent, the family starts experiencing unexplainable phenomena, objects moving on their own, chilling whispers in the night, and shadowy figures lurking in corners.

Lea's drawings depict gruesome images of mutilated bodies and blood-soaked scenes, hinting at the malevolent nature of her “friend.” The family's pet dog is found dead under mysterious circumstances, its body twisted unnaturally. Josie, desperate to save her daughter, seeks help from a local albularyo (folk healer), who reveals that the entity is a restless spirit seeking vengeance.

In a climax, the spirit possesses Lea, leading to a violent confrontation where Josie must choose between saving her daughter or succumbing to the entity's wrath. The segment ends with a haunting image of Lea's empty eyes staring into the void.

=== "The Manager" ===
Lucky, an ambitious employee at an advertising firm, is thrilled to be promoted to manager after her predecessor, Manilyn, mysteriously disappears. However, her excitement turns to dread as she begins to experience disturbing visions of Manilyn, who appears disfigured and bloodied, lurking in the office shadows.

Colleagues report hearing Manilyn's voice echoing through empty hallways, and security footage shows glimpses of her ghost wandering the premises. Lucky discovers a hidden room containing ritualistic symbols and a journal detailing Manilyn's descent into madness, revealing that she had made a pact with a dark entity to secure her position.

As the entity demands a new soul, Lucky finds herself trapped in a nightmarish cycle of hallucinations and physical torment. In a desperate attempt to break free, she confronts the spirit in a blood-soaked showdown, only to realize that escaping the curse may require a sacrifice greater than she anticipated.

=== "The Actress" ===
A fledgling production company embarks on filming a horror movie in an abandoned mansion rumored to be haunted. The lead actress, begins experiencing eerie occurrences, unexplained bruises, whispers during rehearsals, and visions of a woman in white with hollow eyes.

As filming progresses, crew members suffer gruesome accidents, one is found impaled on a lighting rig, another disappears, leaving behind only a trail of blood. The director uncovers a hidden chamber in the mansion containing relics of occult rituals and realizes that the script mirrors real events that transpired within the house.

The boundary between fiction and reality blurs as the spirit of a vengeful actress, wronged and murdered during a past production, seeks retribution. In a climactic scene, the current actress is possessed, reenacting the tragic events that led to the original haunting. The film concludes with the production company fleeing the cursed set, leaving behind the unfinished film and unanswered questions.

== Cast ==
=== "The Actress" ===
- Jeric Raval as The Director
- AJ Raval as The Actress
- DJ Durano as The Assistant Director
- Rob Sy as The Script Writer
- Precious Aleyah Magdrigal as The Ghost Lady
- Noa Hyun as The BTS Guy
- Baby Rofiles as The Producer

=== "The Manager" ===
- Aubrey Caraan as Lucky
- Veronica Reyes as Manilyn
- Ping Medina as Boss Alex
- JK Raval as George
- Kevin Erika Buensuceso as Officemate
- Gaive Buensuceso as Officemate
- Mica Mendoza as Officemate
- Angel Agualada as Officemate
- Precious Aleyah Magdrigal as Aleyah

=== "The Imaginary Friend" ===
- Angel Agualada as Bully
- Mianne Agualada as Ester
- Richard Quan as Fernando
- Shermaine Santiago as Josie
- Arkin Del Rosario as Jerome
- Elia Ilano as Lea
- Francine Gamboa as Anna
- Minstrel Agualada as Taong Grasa
- Joseph Ryan Palero as Reporter

== Accolades ==
Year	Awards	Category	Recipient	Result	Ref.
2024	72nd FAMAS Awards	Best Child Actress	Elia Ilano	Won	
2024	Gawad Dangal Filipino Awards	Best Child Actress of the Year	Elia Ilano	Won	
2024	Dangal ng Lahing Filipino Awards	Most Outstanding Child Actress of the Year	Elia Ilano	Won	

== Release ==
The film was released on October 22, 2023, under LMK films and distributed by iWantTFC.
