= The Gift (2019 Philippine TV series) =

Philippine television drama series

- Title card
- Genre: Drama
- Created by: Patrick Ilagan; Denoy Navarro-Punio; Agnes Gagelonia-Uligan; Aloy Adlawan
- Written by: Agnes Gagelonia-Uligan; Rona Lean Sales; Patrick Ilagan; Loi Argel Nova
- Directed by: Lord Alvin Madridejos
- Creative director: Aloy Adlawan
- Starring: Alden Richards
- Country of origin: Philippines
- Original language: Tagalog
- No. of episodes: 105 (list of episodes)

Production
- Executive producer: Rosie Lyn Atienza
- Cinematography: Alberto Banzon
- Editors: Robert Reyes; Mark Valderama
- Camera setup: Multiple-camera setup
- Running time: 24–41 minutes
- Production company: GMA Entertainment Group

Original release
- Network: GMA Network
- Release: September 16, 2019 – February 7, 2020

The Gift is a Philippine television drama series broadcast by GMA Network. Directed by Lord Alvin Madridejos, it stars Alden Richards. It premiered on September 16, 2019 on the network's Telebabad line up. The series concluded on February 7, 2020, with a total of 105 episodes.

The series is streaming online on YouTube.

== Premise ==
Joseph, a vendor in Divisoria uses his charm and enthusiasm to get through the hard days. Together with his adoptive family Strawberry and Char, he continues to find happiness despite the challenges in life. One day, he gets in a near-death accident leading him to lose his eyesight and gain the ability of clairvoyance.

== Cast and characters ==
Cast

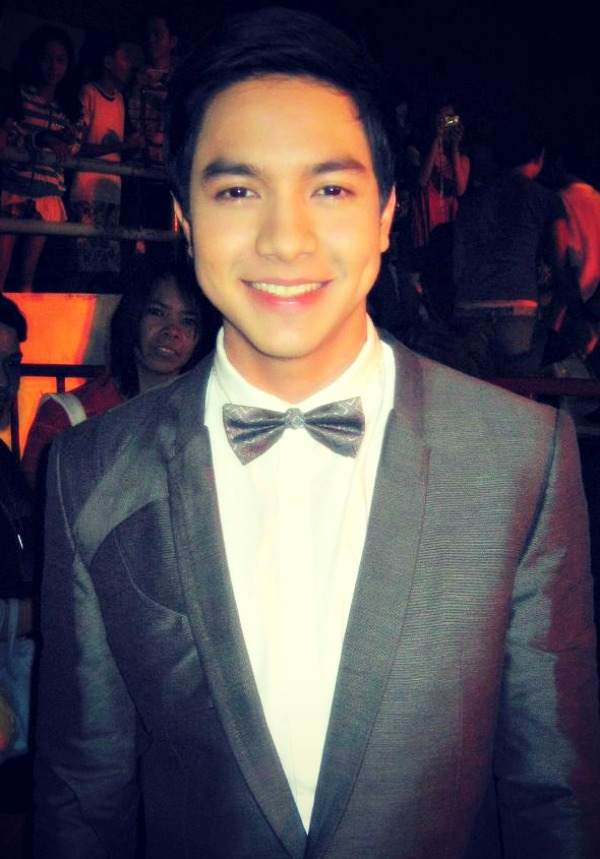
Alden Richards

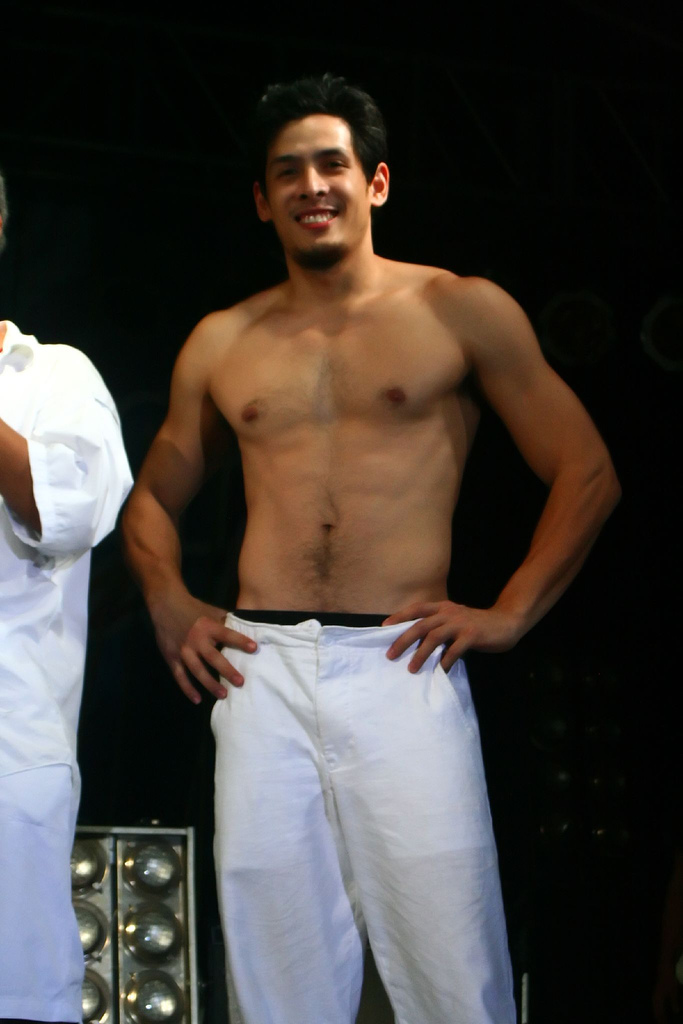
Christian Vasquez

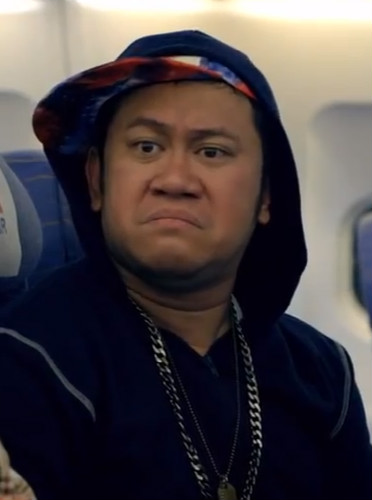
Betong Sumaya

Lead cast

- Alden Richards as Joseph Toledo / Serafin "Sep" Apostol

Supporting cast

- Jean Garcia as Nadia Montes-Toledo/Marcelino
- Jo Berry as Strawberry "Straw" Apostol Anzures
- Elizabeth Oropesa as Charito "Char" Apostol
- Martin del Rosario as Jared M. Marcelino
- Mikee Quintos as Amor
- Christian Vasquez as Javier R. Marcelino
- Rochelle Pangilinan as Francine Delgado
- Mikoy Morales as Benedict "Bistek" Tecson
- Divine Tetay as Tonya
- Betong Sumaya as Asi
- Luz Valdez as Puring Reyes Marcelino
- Victor Anastacio as Andoy
- Ysabel Ortega as Sabina M. Marcelino
- Thia Thomalla as Faith Salcedo

Guest cast

- TJ Trinidad as Gener Toledo
- Meg Imperial as Lizette
- Ruru Madrid as Eloy
- Louise Bolton as Maggie
- Gerald Madrid as Carlo
- Michael Flores as Rambo
- Mosang as Baby
- Allan Paule as Andres
- Aaron Villanueva as baby Sep
- Khaine Hernandez as younger Sep
- Leandro Baldemor as Luis
- Jackie Lou Blanco as Ortiz
- Skelly Clarkson as Taba
- John Kenneth Giducos as Tolits
- Dunhill Banzon as Dan
- Jay Arcilla as Mando
- Cheska Diaz as Felicia Salcedo
- Lui Manansala as Daisy
- Orlando Sol as Bomber
- Omar Flores as Alcazar
- Simon Ibarra as a priest
- Dion Ignacio as a former boyfriend
- Rosanna Iringan as Mrs. Tan
- JD Lopez as Nonoy
- Froilan Manto as a manager
- Zane Mariñas as Manny
- Ranty Portento as Mike
- Dexter Macalintal as Viena
- Froilan Sales as a policeman
- Shermaine Santiago as a bank teller
- Regine Tolentino as Anna
- Peggy Rico Tuazon as Niño's mother
- Lander Vera-Perez as a syndicate member
- Roadfill as Benok
- Brylle Mondejar as a doctor
- Marlon Mance as Castillo
- Gilleth Sandico as Gloria
- Marx Topacio as younger Javier
- Kristine Abbey as Abby
- Faith da Silva as younger Charito
- Tanya Gomez as Lourdes
- Marnie Lapus as Lian
- Dave Bornea as Jacob
- Ramon Christopher as Alcazar
- Rosanna Iringan as Mrs. Tan
- Bembol Roco as Crispin Anzures
- Raquel Monteza as Lolita Anzures
- Dominic Roco as younger Crispin
- Sophie Albert as Helga Ventura-Apostol
- Robert Ortega as Oliver
- Mika Gorospe as Lorraine
- Baste Granfon as Kyle Cordero
- Smokey Manaloto as Bradley Ventura
- Leanne Bautista as Meryll Ventura
- Channel Morales as Paula
- Epy Quizon as Gabriel
- Dindo Arroyo as Johnson
- Biboy Ramirez as Caleb
- Muriel Lomadilla as Jun
- Paolo Paraiso as Lester

== Production ==
Principal photography commenced on August 7, 2019. Filming concluded in January 2020.

== Ratings ==
According to AGB Nielsen Philippines' Nationwide Urban Television Audience Measurement People in television homes, the pilot episode of The Gift earned a 9.5% rating.

== Accolades ==
Accolades received by The Gift
| Year | Award | Category | Recipient | Result | Ref. |
|---|---|---|---|---|---|
| 2019 | 4th GEMS Awards | Best Actor in a TV Series | Alden Richards | Won | |
| 2020 | 42nd Catholic Mass Media Awards | Best Drama Series Program | The Gift | Won | |
| 2021 | 34th PMPC Star Awards for Television | Best Child Performer | Charles Jacob Brix | Nominated | |
| 2021 | 34th PMPC Star Awards for Television | Best Drama Actor | Alden Richards | Nominated | |
| 2021 | 34th PMPC Star Awards for Television | Best Primetime Drama Series | The Gift | Nominated | |
