= Philippine Children's Television Foundation =

Filipino foundation

The Philippine Children's Television Foundation (PCTF), is a non-profit organization that pioneered educational television in the Philippines. It was initially formed to partner with Sesame Workshop (formerly Children's Television Workshop) to create Sesame!, later known as Batibot.

== Books ==
These are books published by the PCTF, other than those directly relating to Batibot.

=== Buhay-Bata ===
- Nasaan ang Tsinelas Ko
- Ang Prinsesang Ayaw Matulog
- Ang Kuya ni Karina
- Ang Kaibigan ng Dilim
- Si Paula Oink-Oink
- Gusto Ko ng Pansit Ngayon
- Ayokong Pumasok sa Paaralan
- Nagsasabi Na si Patpat
- Dagat sa Kama ni Troy
- Ang Prinsipeng Ayaw Maligo

=== Karapatan ng Bata ===
- Isang Mundong Makabata
- Pasan Ko si Bunso
- Ang Batang Ayaw Gumising
- Sina Dosol at Mokopoy
- Kagila-gilalas Na Kahon
- Ang Bata sa Basket
- Sa Ilalim ng Dagat
- Si Owel, ang Batang Matakaw
- Ason, Luming at Teresing
- Sa Bagong Planeta

=== Aklat Tsinoy ===
- Kumusta!

Text: Rene O. Villanueva and Feny de los Angeles-Bautista Design: Kora Dandan-Albano Computer generated color correction: Ramon C. Sunico

- Sino Ako?

Text: Rene O. Villanueva and Feny de los Angeles-Bautista Design: Joanne de Leon Computer generated color correction: Ramon C. Sunico

- Ang Pamilya Ko

Text: Rene O. Villanueva at Feny de los Angeles-Bautista Design: Joanne de Leon Computer generated color correction: Ramon C. Sunico

- Sa Parke

Text: Rene O. Villanueva at Feny de los Angeles-Bautista Design: Kora Dandan-Albano Computer generated color correction: Ramon C. Sunico

== TV shows ==
- 1896 Kalayaan (GMA Network)
- Batang Batibot (GMA Network)
- Batibot (RPN, ABS-CBN, PTV, GMA Network and TV5)
- Bulilit (GMA Network)
- Koko Kwik Kwak (GMA Network)
- Pin Pin (PTV) - very first Chinese language children's show on Philippine TV
- PG (Parents Guide) (GMA Network; developed by GMA News and Public Affairs, now split into GMA News and GMA Public Affairs)
- Art Angel (GMA Network)
