= Love You Two =

2019 Philippine television drama series

- Title card
- Genre: Drama; Romantic comedy
- Created by: Glaiza Ramirez
- Written by: Onay Sales; Renei Dimla; Glaiza Ramirez
- Directed by: Irene Emma Villamor
- Creative director: Aloy Adlawan
- Starring: Jennylyn Mercado; Gabby Concepcion
- Theme music composer: Ann Margaret Figueroa
- Opening theme: "It Takes Love" by Jennylyn Mercado
- Country of origin: Philippines
- Original language: Tagalog
- No. of episodes: 104 (list of episodes)

Production
- Executive producer: Joy Lumboy-Pili
- Production locations: Metro Manila, Philippines
- Cinematography: Juan Lorenzo Orendain III
- Editors: Benedict Lavastida; Ver Custodio; Renard Torres
- Camera setup: Multiple-camera setup
- Running time: 22–36 minutes
- Production company: GMA Entertainment Group

Original release
- Network: GMA Network
- Release: April 22 – September 13, 2019

Love You Two is a 2019 Philippine television drama romantic comedy series broadcast by GMA Network. Directed by Irene Emma Villamor, it stars Jennylyn Mercado and Gabby Concepcion. It premiered on April 22, 2019 on the network's Telebabad line up. The series concluded on September 13, 2019, with a total of 104 episodes.

The series is streaming online on YouTube.

== Premise ==
Sisters Raffy Batungbakal and Sam Batungbakal had a perfect relationship until they unintentionally fell in love with the same guy. Raffy recently broke up with her boyfriend, is overprotective of her sister especially when she found that her sister is dating a much older guy, Jake Reyes. Raffy will eventually see Jake's value and it is the reason why she will fall in love with him.

== Cast and characters ==
Cast

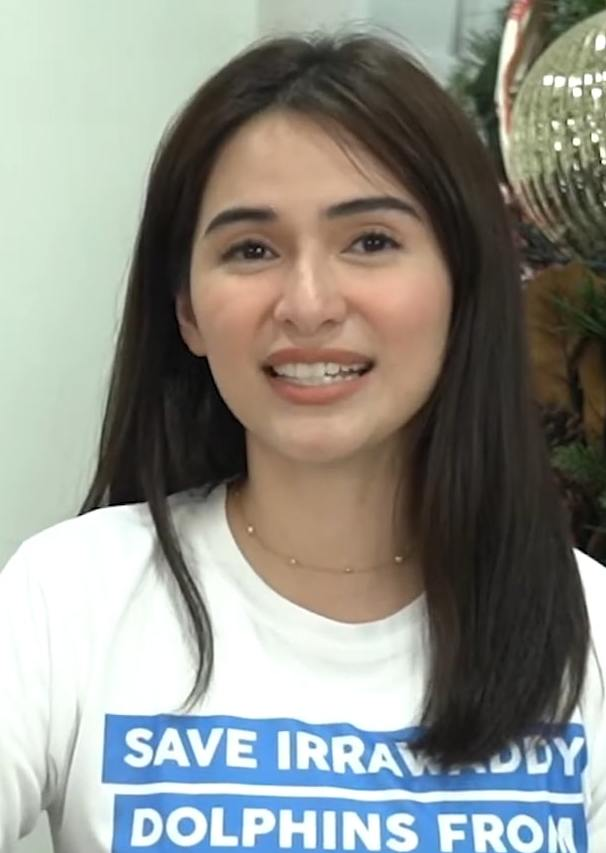
Jennylyn Mercado

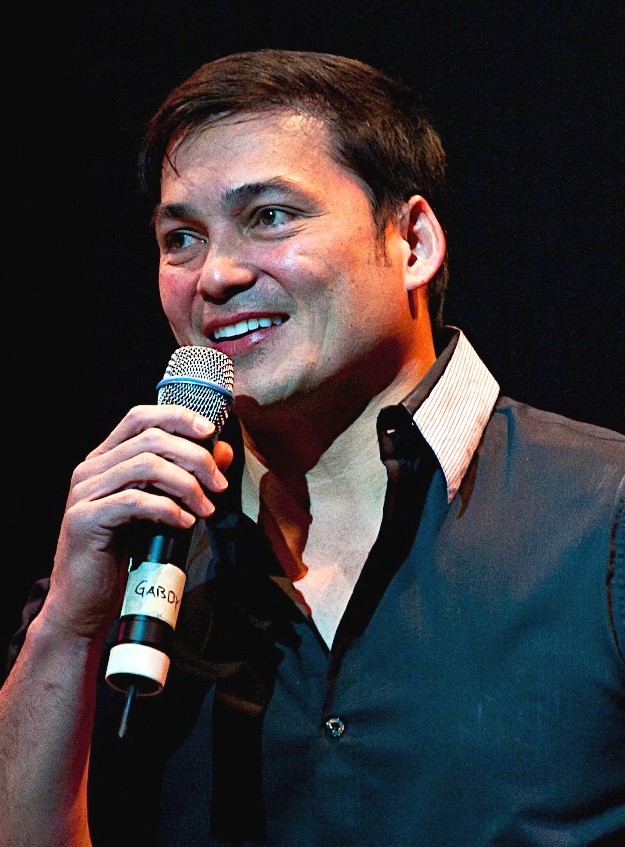
Gabby Concepcion

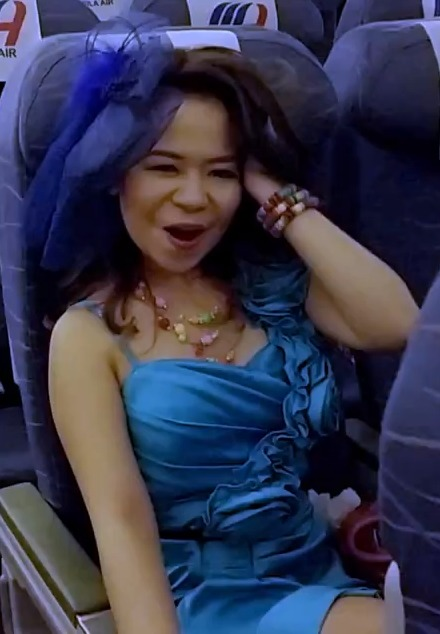
Kiray Celis

Lead cast

- Jennylyn Mercado as Rafaella "Raffy" Batungbakal-Reyes
- Gabby Concepcion as Joaquin "Jake" Reyes Jr.

Supporting cast

- Solenn Heussaff as Lianne Martinez
- Shaira Diaz as Samantha "Sam" Batungbakal-Marquez
- Sheena Halili as Janina "Nina" Solis
- Jerald Napoles as Harrison Ford Batungbakal
- Kiray Celis as Darling Innocencio-Batungbakal
- Nar Cabico as Miguel "Migs" Borromeo
- Yasser Marta as Edison Marquez
- Michelle Dee as Michaela "Mochi" Isidro
- Clint Bondad as Theo Hoffmann
- Freddie Webb as Joaquin "Jake" Reyes Sr.
- Madeleine Nicolas as Teresita Reyes
- Joshua Zamora as Sebastian "Baste" Reyes

Guest cast

- Shermaine Santiago as Jean
- Don Umali as Mandap
- Seth dela Cruz as Jay-R Batungbakal
- Elia Ilano as Yumi Batungbakal
- Ollie Espino as Albert
- Nova Villa as Gloria
- JC Tiuseco as Chris
- James Teng as Louie
- Caprice Cayetano as Alex Borromeo
- Shyr Valdez as Edna Marquez
- Lolli Mara as Pandora Martinez
- Renz Fernandez as Matt
- Andre Paras as Adonis
- Barbie Forteza as Venus
- Pauline Mendoza as Zora

== Production ==
Principal photography commenced in February 2019. Filming concluded in September 2019.

== Ratings ==
According to AGB Nielsen Philippines' Nationwide Urban Television Audience Measurement People in television homes, the pilot episode of Love You Two earned an 8.3% rating.

== Accolades ==
Accolades received by Love You Two
Year	Award	Category	Recipient	Result	Ref.
2019	33rd PMPC Star Awards for Television	Best Primetime TV Series	Love You Two	Nominated	
2019	33rd PMPC Star Awards for Television	Best New Female TV Personality	Michelle Dee	Nominated	
