= The Turtle and the Monkey =

Filipino fable

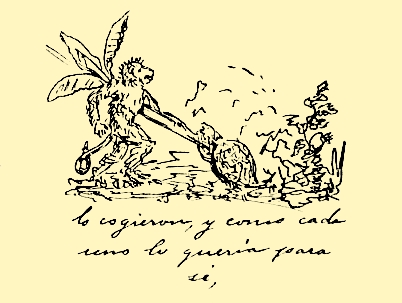
A sample of Rizal's illustration of The Monkey and The Turtle

The Turtle and the Monkey (Tagalog: Ang Pagong at ang Matsing or Si Pagong at si Matsing) also known as The Monkey and the Turtle is a Philippine fable. It involves the tortoise outwitting a monkey over a banana tree. The story was popularized by Jose Rizal, who made a publication of the story in English in the July 1889 issue of Trübner's Oriental Record in England, which is considered to be the formal beginning of Philippine children's literature.

== Origin ==
The origin of the story can be traced to the Ilocano, which is linked to Indian arts. The Ilocano version of the story offers an explanation on why monkeys don't eat meat. Versions of the story have a common theme of a weaker but cunning character (the tortoise or turtle) winning over a stronger adversary (the monkey).

During his visit to Juan Luna in January 1886 in France, Rizal illustrated the story in 34 plates which he made in an album belonging to Luna's wife. Rizal is considered as the first Filipino cartoonist for this feat and for illustrating five tales by Hans Christian Andersen. Rizal did The Tortoise and the Monkey and the five Andersen tales in Tagalog.

== See also ==
- The Tortoise and the Hare
