= James Reid discography =

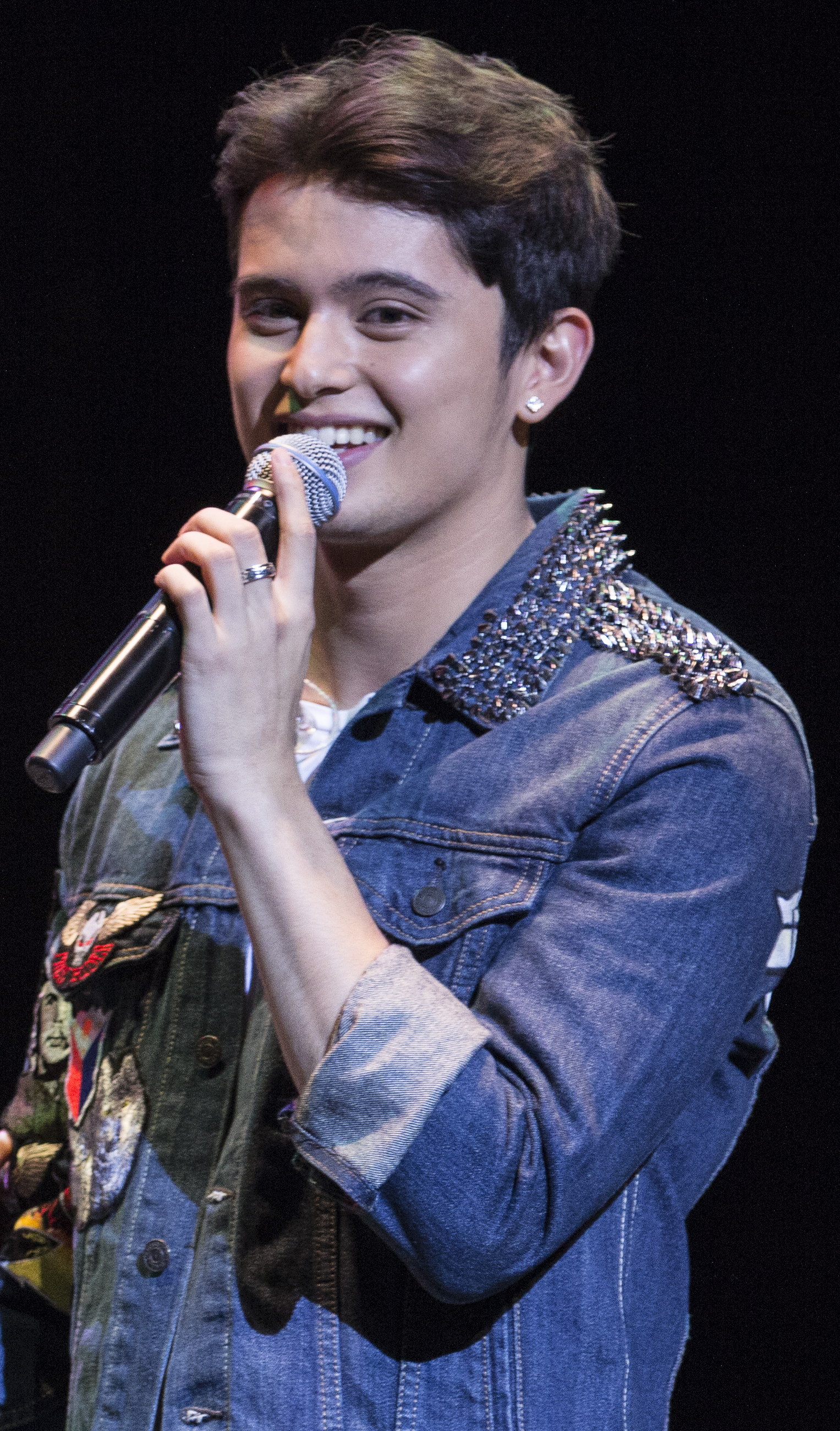
- Studio albums: 3
- EPs: 4
- Singles: 35
- Soundtrack albums: 3
- Promotional singles: 2
- Mixtapes: 1
- Music videos: 18

Filipino-Australian singer-actor James Reid has released three studio albums, four extended plays, thirty-five singles (including six as a featured artist), three soundtrack albums, one mixtape and twenty-six music videos. After being named as the Big Winner of Pinoy Big Brother: Teen Clash 2010, he signed with Star Records and released We Are Whatever, a joint extended play with Bret Jackson, on iTunes.

In late 2012, Reid signed with Viva Records. He released his first solo extended play, James Reid in September 2013, accompanied by his debut single, "Alam Niya Ba". His second solo extended play, Reid Alert was released in February 2015. It is accompanied by three singles: "Huwag Ka Nang Humirit", "Hanap-Hanap", featuring his then-girlfriend Nadine Lustre, and "Randomantic".

In 2017, Reid founded the record label, Careless, and released his debut studio album, Palm Dreams. It is accompanied by three singles "Cool Down", "Turning Up", and "The Life". His second studio album, lovescene:, was released in October 2022. It is accompanied by the single "u & i".

== Albums ==
=== Studio albums ===
List of studio albums, with selected details
Title	Album details
Palm Dreams	Released: July 8, 2017 (PHL); Label: Careless; Format: Digital download, CD, streaming
Lovescene:	Released: October 13, 2022 (PHL); Label: Careless; Format: Digital download, streaming
Honey, I'm Home	Released: September 10, 2026 (PHL); Label: Careless; Format: Digital download, streaming

=== Mixtapes ===
List of mixtapes, with selected details
Title	Album details
Careless Mixtape (as part of Careless Music Artists)	Released: August 6, 2018 (PHL); Label: Careless; Format: Digital download, streaming

=== Soundtrack albums ===
List of soundtrack albums, with selected details
Title	Album details
Diary ng Panget	Released: March 26, 2014 (PHL); Label: Viva; Format: Digital download, CD, streaming
Never Not Love You	Released: March 27, 2018 (PHL); Label: Viva; Format: Digital download, streaming
Indak	Released: June 21, 2019 (PHL); Label: Viva; Format: Digital download, streaming

== Extended plays ==
List of extended plays, with selected details and certifications
Title	Album details	Certifications
We Are Whatever (with Bret Jackson)	Released: August 22, 2011 (PHL); Label: Star; Format: Digital download	—N/a
James Reid	Released: September 4, 2013 (PHL); Label: Viva; Format: Digital download, 12", streaming	—N/a
Reid Alert	Released: February 14, 2015 (PHL); Label: Viva; Format: Digital download, 12", streaming	PARI: Gold
jgh	Released: November 29, 2024 June 6, 2025 (Deluxe) (PHL); Label: Careless Music, Sony Music Philippines; Format: Digital download, streaming	—N/a

== Singles ==
=== As lead artist ===
List of singles as lead artist, showing year released, and album name
Title	Year	Album
"Alam Niya Ba"	2013	James Reid
"No Erase" (with Nadine Lustre)	2014	Diary ng Panget
"Huwag Ka Nang Humirit"	2015	Reid Alert
"Hanap-Hanap" (with Nadine Lustre)	2015	Reid Alert and Para sa Hopeless Romantic
"Musikaw" (featuring Pio)	2015	PhilPop 2015
"On the Wings of Love" (with Nadine Lustre)	2015	On the Wings of Love
"Randomantic"	2016	Reid Alert
"This Time" (with Nadine Lustre)	2016	This Time
"Till I Met You" (with Nadine Lustre)	2016	Till I Met You
"Cool Down"	2017	Palm Dreams
"Turning Up"	2017	Palm Dreams
"The Life"	2017	Palm Dreams
"16B"	2018	Careless Mixtape
"Right There"	2018	Non-album single
"Prom" (with Nadine Lustre)	2018	Never Not Love You
"Summer" (with Nadine Lustre)	2019	Careless Mixtape
"Risky" (with Avin featuring Kingwaw)	2019	Non-album singles
"Fiend" (featuring Just Hush)	2019	Non-album singles
"Soul Love" (with Kris Delano)	2019	Non-album singles
"Mandaue Nights" (featuring Mandaue Nights)	2019	Non-album singles
"Healing"	2019	Non-album singles
"Tropical Vikings" (with Curtismith, Massiah, Jid Durano, Jetter, and Kingwaw)	2019	Non-album singles
"Soda"	2021	Non-album singles
"Hello"	2021	Non-album singles
"Crazy"	2021	Non-album singles
"Own It" (with Nadine Lustre and Massiah)	2021	Non-album singles
"Hello 2.0 (Legends Only)" (featuring JAY B and ØZI)	2022	Non-album singles
"u & i"	2022	lovescene:
"lie to me" (featuring Destiny Rogers)	2022	lovescene:
"Jacuzzi" (with B.I and DJ Flict)	2023	Non-album single
"Hurt Me Too"	2024	jgh
"Sandal"	2024	jgh
"'Di Bale"	2025	jgh
"Pahinga" (with TJ Monterde)	2025	jgh (Deluxe)
"Blessed"	2025	Honey, I'm Home
"You Deserve It!"	2025	Non-album single
"Traffic"	2026	Honey, I'm Home
"Richest Man Alive"	2026	Honey, I'm Home

=== As featured artist ===
List of singles as featured artist, showing year released, and album name
Title	Year	Album
"Bahala Na" (Nadine Lustre featuring James Reid)	2014	Nadine Lustre and Talk Back and You're Dead
"Caught in Your Feelings" (Kingwaw featuring James Reid)	2017	Non-album single
"Filipina Girl" (Billy Crawford featuring Markus Davis and James Reid)	2019	Work in Progress
"Experience" (Massiah featuring James Reid)	2019	Non-album single
"Backhouse Ballin'" (MANILA GREY featuring James Reid)	2021	No Saints on Knight Street
"HATDOG" (Zack Tabudlo featuring James Reid)	2022	Non-album single
"4 Letters" (B.I featuring James Reid)	2023	Love or Loved Part.2
"Luck" (Maki featuring James Reid)	2026	Non-album single

=== Collaborative singles ===
List of collaborative singles
Title	Year	Other acts	Album	Ref.
"Sunny Side"	2026	Luke April	Honey, I'm Home	

=== Promotional singles ===
List of promotional singles, showing year released and album name
Title	Year	Album
"Thank You for the Love" (with Nadine Lustre, Daniel Padilla, Kathryn Bernardo, Liza Soberano, Enrique Gil, Bamboo and Elha Nympha)	2015	Non-album singles
"Kaya Mo" (with Mark Bautista, Nadine Lustre, Yassi Pressman, Donnalyn Bartolome, Thyro Alfaro, Yumi Lacsamana, Shehyee and Rico Blanco)	2016	Non-album singles
"Mirasol"	2024	jgh

== As songwriter ==
#	Song	Year	Artist	Album	Contribution	Ref.
1	"St4y Up"	2018	Nadine Lustre	—N/a	Co-writer	

== Music videos ==
List of music videos, showing year released and directors
Title	Year	Other artist(s)	Director(s)	Ref.
As lead artist
"Alam Niya Ba"	2013	None	Emmanuel Bernardino	
"A Warm Greeting: James and Nadine Shares Gift to Fans"	2014	Nadine Lustre	Unknown	
"Huwag Ka Nang Humirit"	2015	None	Miggy Tanchanco	
"Hanap-Hanap"	2015	Nadine Lustre	Ryan Evangelista	
"Randomantic"	2016	None	Unknown	
"Cool Down"	2017	None	Deejay Fabian	
"Turning Up"	2017	None	Deejay Fabian	
"The Life"	2017	None	Nadine Lustre; Petersen Vargas	
"16B"	2018	None	Justin Valiente	
"Summer"	2019	Nadine Lustre	Chino Villagracia; Nadine Lustre	
"Risky"	2019	Avin; KINGwAw	Youngkwang Kim	
"Fiend"	2019	Just Hush	Dominic Bekaert	
"Soda"	2021	None	Judd Figuerres	
"Hello"	2021	None	Gab Valenciano	
"Own It"	2021	Nadine Lustre; Massiah	Lox Valiente	
"Hello 2.0 (Legends Only)"	2022	JAY B ØZI	None	
"u & i"	2022	None	Aerin Moreno	
"lie to me"	2022	Destiny Rogers	Judd Figuerres	
"Hurt Me Too"	2024	None	None	
"Attention"	2026	None	Ingrid Ignacio-Termulo	
As featured artist
"Bahala Na"	2014	Nadine Lustre	Miggy Tanchanco	
"Thank You for the Love"	2015	Daniel Padilla; Kathryn Bernardo; Nadine Lustre; Enrique Gil; Liza Soberano; Elha Nympha; Bamboo Mañalac	Paolo Ramos; Peewee Gonzales	
"Kaya Mo"	2016	Mark Bautista; Rico Blanco; Nadine Lustre; Yassi Pressman; Donnalyn Bartolome; Thyro Alfaro; Yumi Lacsamana; Shehyee	Unknown	
"Filipina Girl"	2019	Billy Crawford; Marcus Davis	Kenneth Gabona	
"Luck"	2026	Maki	Ingrid Ignacio-Termulo	
In movie soundtracks
"No Erase"	2014	Nadine Lustre	Jowee Morel	
"Natataranta"	2014	None	Miggy Tanchanco	
"This Time"	2016	Nadine Lustre	Unknown	
"Prom"	2018	Nadine Lustre	Unknown	
Guest appearances
"Don't Say You Love Me"	2010	Krissy & Ericka	Unknown	
"Ngayong Pasko Magniningning Ang Pilipino"	2010	Gary Valenciano; Toni Gonzaga	Paolo Ramos	
"All I Need is Love"	2011	Bret Jackson	Unknown	
"Paligoy-Ligoy"	2014	Nadine Lustre	Unknown	
"Para-paraan"	2014	Nadine Lustre	Unknown	
"Mr. Antipatiko"	2014	Nadine Lustre	Ryan Evangelista	
"Thank You, Ang Babait Ninyo"	2014	Lyca Gairanod; Darren Espanto; Juan Karlos Labajo; Darlene Vibares	Paolo Ramos; Peewee Gonzales	
"Shine, Pilipinas!"	2015	Enrique Gil; Liza Soberano	Paolo Ramos; Peewee Gonzales	
"On the Wings of Love"	2015	Kyla	Unknown	
"Shopping"	2015	Ryan Bang	Jose Mari Reyes	
"Till I Met You"	2016	Kyla	Andoy Ranay	
"Para Sa Mga Ex"	2021	Zack Tabudlo	Unknown	
