= List of awards and nominations received by James Reid =

James Reid awards and nominations
Awards and nominations
Awards	Wins	Nominations
Aliw Award	0	1
AnakTV Seal Awards	1	0
ASAP Pop Viewers' Choice Awards	4	6
Awit Award	0	3
COMGUILD Academe's Choice Awards	1	0
EdukCirle Awards	2	4
FAMAS Awards	1	1
GMMSF Box-Office Entertainment Awards	2	0
Golden Laurel Lycean's Choice Media Awards	1	0
MOR Pinoy Music Awards	3	4
MTV Europe Music Awards	1	1
Myx Music Award	3	7
Nickelodeon Kids' Choice Awards	0	1
PEP List Choice Awards	1	8
PMPC Star Awards for Movies	0	4
PMPC Star Awards for Music	1	4
PMPC Star Awards for Television	1	1
PUSH Awards	2	13
RAWR Awards	2	5
SBS PopAsia Awards	2	0
Star Cinema Online Awards	3	10
Starmometer Awards	3	3
Yes! Magazine	3	0
Awards won	37
Nominations	76

This is a list of awards, recognitions, achievements and nominations received by Filipino singer-songwriter and actor James Reid during his career.

== International ==
=== 100 Asian Heartthrobs ===
Year	Nominee / work	Award	Result	Ref.
2018	Himself	100 Asian Heartthrobs of 2018	Rank 9th	

=== MTV Europe Music Awards ===
The MTV Europe Music Awards are an event presented by MTV Networks Europe which awards prizes to musicians and performers.

Year	Nominee / work	Award	Result	Ref.
2015	Reid Alert	Best Southeast Asia Act	Nominated	
2017	James Reid	Best Southeast Asia Act	Won	

=== Nickelodeon Kids' Choice Awards ===
The Nickelodeon Kids' Choice Awards is an annual awards show that airs on the Nickelodeon cable channel, that honors the year's biggest television, movie, and music acts, as voted by Nickelodeon viewers.

Year	Nominee / work	Award	Result	Ref.
2016	—N/a	Favorite Pinoy Personality	Nominated	

=== SBS PopAsia Awards ===
The SBS PopAsia Awards is an annual awards ceremony presented by the Australian music show SBS PopAsia to honor the Asian music industry.

Year	Nominee / work	Award	Result	Ref.
2015	Reid Alert	Best Solo Star	Won	
2016	JaDine	Best Fandom (with Nadine Lustre)	Won	

== Local ==
=== Aliw Awards ===
The Aliw Awards is an annual awards ceremony established by the renowned Philippine journalist Alice H. Reyes, to recognize achievements in the live entertainment industry in the Philippines.

Year	Nominee / work	Award	Result	Ref.
2015	Reid Alert	Best New Male Artist	Nominated	

=== AnakTV Seal Awards ===
The Anak TV Seal Award is an accolade given to Philippine television programs and personalities that are child-sensitive and family-friendly.

Year	Nominee / work	Award	Result	Ref.
2016	—N/a	AnakTV Makabata Star Awardee	Included	

=== ASAP Pop Viewers' Choice Awards ===
The ASAP Pop Viewers' Choice Awards is an annual award show that airs on the ABS-CBN, which is held on a Sunday afternoon during ASAP. It honors the year's biggest television, movie, and music acts, as voted by Kapamilya fans.

Year	Nominee / work	Award	Result	Ref.
2010	Pinoy Big Brother: Teen Clash 2010	Pop Tween Popsies (with Ann Li)	Won	
2011	Good Vibes	Pop Tween Popsies (with Devon Seron)	Won	
2014	Para-paraan (by Nadine Lustre)	Pop Celebrity Cameo in a Music Video	Nominated	
2014	Diary ng Panget	Pop Loveteam (with Nadine Lustre)	Nominated	
2014	Diary ng Panget	Pop Screen Kiss (with Nadine Lustre)	Nominated	
2014	—N/a	Pop Male Cutie	Nominated	
2015	—N/a	Pop Teen Hearthrob	Nominated	
2015	Para sa Hopeless Romantic	Pop Teen Love Team (with Nadine Lustre)	Won	
2016	Till I Met You	Pop Loveteam (with Nadine Lustre)	Won	
2016	JaDine	Pop Fans Club (with Nadine Lustre)	Nominated	

=== Awit Awards ===
The Awit Awards are music awards in the Philippines given annually by the Philippine Association of the Record Industry (PARI) to recognize the outstanding achievements in the music industry.

Year	Nominee / work	Award	Result	Ref.
2014	Alam Niya Ba	Best Performance by a New Male Recording Artist	Nominated	
2016	Huwag Ka Nang Humirit	Best Performance by a Male Recording Artist	Nominated	
2016	Hanap-Hanap	Best Collaboration (with Nadine Lustre)	Nominated	

=== COMGUILD Academe's Choice Awards ===
The COMGUILD Academe's Choice Awards aims to recognize the contribution of Filipino endorsers, entrepreneur shows, and hosts in the field of entrepreneurship, business, marketing and advertising. Students and members of the academe from various colleges and universities in the Philippines are the one who vote for the awardees.

Year	Nominee / work	Award	Result	Ref.
2015	—N/a	Most Loved Male Endorser	Won	

=== EdukCircle Awards ===
The EdukCircle Awards recognizes exemplary performances of personalities in news and entertainment whose professional works have made significant contributions to Philippine music, film and television.

Year	Nominee / work	Award	Result	Ref.
2015	Para sa Hopeless Romantic	Most Popular Breakout Loveteam of the Year (with Nadine Lustre)	Nominated	
2016	On the Wings of Love	Drama Actor of the Year	Nominated	
2016	Reid Alert	Most Influential Male Music Artist of the Year	Nominated	
2016	—N/a	Most Influential Film Celebrities of the Year (with Nadine Lustre)	Nominated	
2016	—N/a	Most Influential Love Team of the Year (with Nadine Lustre)	Won	
2016	—N/a	Most Influential Celebrity Endorser of the Year	Won	

=== FAMAS Awards ===
The FAMAS Awards are the annual honors given by the Filipino Academy of Movie Arts and Sciences (FAMAS), an organization composed of prize-winning writers and movie columnists, for achievements in the Philippine cinema for a calendar year.

Year	Nominee / work	Award	Result	Ref.
2014	—N/a	German Moreno Youth Achievement Award	Won	
2016	Para sa Hopeless Romantic	Best Actor	Nominated	
2019	Never Not Love You	Best Actor	Nominated	

=== GMMSF Box-Office Entertainment Awards ===
The GMMSF Box-Office Entertainment Awards is an annual award ceremony that honors stars and performers simply for their popularity and commercial success in the Philippine entertainment industry, regardless of their excellence in their particular fields.

Year	Nominee / work	Award	Result	Ref.
2015	Diary ng Panget; Talk Back and You're Dead	Most Popular Loveteam in Movies & TV (with Nadine Lustre)	Won	
2016	On the Wings of Love	Prince of Philippine Television	Won	

=== Golden Laurel Lycean's Choice Media Awards ===
Year	Nominee / work	Award	Result	Ref.
2016	On the Wings of Love	Most Popular Love Team (with Nadine Lustre)	Won	

=== MOR Pinoy Music Awards ===
Year	Nominee / work	Award	Result	Ref.
2015	No Erase	Best Collaboration (with Nadine Lustre)	Won	
2015	Bahala Na	Song of the Year (with Nadine Lustre)	Nominated	
2015	Talk Back and You're Dead OST	Album of the Year (with Various Artists)	Nominated	
2015	Huwag Ka Nang Humirit	Male Artist of the Year	Nominated	
2016	Hanap-Hanap	Best Collaboration of the Year (with Nadine Lustre)	Won	
2016	Musikaw	Male Artist of the Year	Won	
2016	Reid Alert	Album of the Year	Nominated	

=== MYX Music Awards ===
The Myx Music Awards is an accolade presented by the cable channel Myx to honor the biggest hitmakers in the Philippines.

Year	Nominee/work	Award	Result	Ref.
2018	Cool Down	Song of the Year	Won	
2018	—N/a	Male Artist of the Year	Won	
2018	—N/a	Artist of the Year	Won	

=== P-pop Music Awards ===
The P-pop Music Awards is an accolade presented by the P-pop Artists League.

Year	Nominee/work	Award	Result	Ref.
2026	"Luck" (with Maki)	Collaboration of the Year	Nominated	

=== PEP List Choice Awards ===
Year	Nominee / work	Award	Result	Ref.
2015	Diary ng Panget	Breakout Star of the Year	Won	
2015	PEPtalk Guesting	Best PEPtalk Episode (with Nadine Lustre)	Nominated	
2015	Diary ng Panget; Talk Back and You're Dead	Male Movie Star of the Year	Nominated	
2015	Diary ng Panget; Talk Back and You're Dead	Celebrity Pair of the Year (with Nadine Lustre)	Nominated	
2016	Para sa Hopeless Romantic	Male Movie Star of the Year	Nominated	
2016	On the Wings of Love	Celebrity Pair of the Year (with Nadine Lustre)	Nominated	
2016	On the Wings of Love	Male TV Star of the Year	Nominated	
2017	Till I Met You	Celebrity Pair of the Year (with Nadine Lustre)	Pending	
2017	Till I Met You	Newsmaker of the Year (with Nadine Lustre)	Pending	

=== PMPC Star Awards for Movies ===
The PMPC Star Awards for Movies is an award giving body organized by the Philippine Movie Press Club that gives honor to the Filipino mainstream and independent films, personalities and movie industry stakeholders.

Year	Nominee / work	Award	Result	Ref.
2015	Diary ng Panget	New Movie Actor of the Year	Nominated	
2015	No Erase	Movie Original Theme Song of the Year (with Nadine Lustre)	Nominated	
2015	Bahala Na	Movie Original Theme Song of the Year (with Nadine Lustre)	Nominated	
2016	Para sa Hopeless Romantic	Movie Loveteam of the Year (with Nadine Lustre)	Nominated	

=== PMPC Star Awards for Music ===
The PMPC Star Awards for Music is an award giving body organized by the Philippine Movie Press Club that gives honor to the Filipino mainstream and independent music, personalities and music industry stakeholders.

Year	Nominee / work	Award	Result	Ref.
2015	Reid Alert	Male Pop Artist of the Year	Nominated	
2015	Reid Alert	RnB Album of the Year	Nominated	
2015	Reid Alert	RnB Artist of the Year	Won	
2016	On the Wings of Love OST	Male Pop Artist of the Year	Nominated	
2016	On the Wings of Love OST	Pop Album of the Year (with Nadine Lustre)	Nominated	

=== PMPC Star Awards for TV ===
The PMPC Star Awards for TV is annual award giving body recognizing the outstanding programming produced by the several TV networks in the Philippines every year.

Year	Nominee / work	Award	Result	Ref.
2016	On the Wings of Love	German Moreno Power Tandem of the Year	Won	
2016	On the Wings of Love	Best Drama Actor	Nominated	
2017	Till I Met You	Best Drama Actor	Nominated	

=== PUSH Awards ===
Year	Nominee / work	Award	Result	Ref.
2015	—N/a	Push Like Category: Favorite Group or Tandem (with Nadine Lustre)	Nominated	
2015	—N/a	Push Tweet Category: Most Loved Group or Tandem (with Nadine Lustre)	Nominated	
2015	—N/a	Push Gram Category: Most Popular Group or Tandem (with Nadine Lustre)	Nominated	
2015	—N/a	Push Play Category: Best Group or Tandem (with Nadine Lustre)	Nominated	
2015	—N/a	Push Play Category: Best Male Celebrity	Nominated	
2015	—N/a	Awesome OOTD King	Won	
2016	—N/a	Push Like Male Celebrity	Nominated	
2016	—N/a	Push Like Group/Tandem (with Nadine Lustre)	Nominated	
2016	—N/a	Push Gram Male Celebrity	Nominated	
2016	—N/a	Push Gram Group/Tandem (with Nadine Lustre)	Nominated	
2016	—N/a	Push Play Male Celebrity	Nominated	
2016	—N/a	Push Play Group/Tandem (with Nadine Lustre)	Nominated	
2016	—N/a	Popular Male Fashion Icon	Nominated	
2016	Marvin Gaye (originally sung by Charlie Puth ft. Meghan Trainor)	Popular Song Cover (with Nadine Lustre)	Nominated	
2016	On the Wings of Love	Popular TV Performance (with Nadine Lustre)	Won	

=== RAWR Awards ===
Year	Nominee / work	Award	Result	Ref.
2015	On the Wings of Love	Trending Love Team of the Year (with Nadine Lustre)	Nominated	
2015	—N/a	Fashionable Celeb of the Year	Won	
2015	—N/a	Male Celebrity of the Year	Nominated	
2016	Till I Met You	Favorite Actor of the Year	Nominated	
2016	JaDine (with Nadine Lustre)	Fan Club of the Year	Nominated	
2016	Till I Met You (with Nadine Lustre)	Popular Love Team of the Year	Nominated	
2016	—N/a	Ultimate Star of the Year	Won	

=== Star Cinema Online Awards ===
Year	Nominee / work	Award	Result	Ref.
2014	—N/a	Newsmaker of the Year	Nominated	
2014	Talk Back and You're Dead	Favorite Loveteam (with Nadine Lustre)	Nominated	
2014	Talk Back and You're Dead	Favorite Male Movie Star	Nominated	
2014	Bahala Na	Favorite Star Cinema Theme Song of the Year (with Nadine Lustre)	Nominated	
2015	Para sa Hopeless Romantic	Favorite Male Movie Star	Nominated	
2015	On the Wings of Love	Favorite TV Loveteam (with Nadine Lustre)	Won	
2015	—N/a	Favorite Newsmaker	Nominated	
2015	—N/a	Favorite Love Out Loveteam (with Nadine Lustre)	Won	
2016	Randomantic	Favorite Recording Artist	Won	
2016	—N/a	Favorite Social Media Personality	Nominated	
2016	JaDine	Best Fandom (with Nadine Lustre)	Nominated	
2016	Till I Met You	Favorite Love Team (with Nadine Lustre)	Nominated	
2016	Till I Met You	Favorite Male Star	Nominated	

=== Yes! Magazine ===
Year	Nominee / work	Award	Result	Ref.
2015	—N/a	100 Most Beautiful Stars	Included	
2016	—N/a	100 Most Beautiful Stars	Included	
2017	—N/a	100 Most Beautiful Stars	Included	
