= Turning Up =

Turning Up may refer to:

- "Turning Up" (Arashi song), released in 2019
- "Turning Up" (James Reid song), released in 2017
