= List of Till I Met You episodes =

Till I Met You is a 2016 Philippine romantic comedy television series directed by Antoinette Jadaone, starring James Reid, Nadine Lustre and JC Santos. The series premiered on ABS-CBN's Primetime Bida evening block and worldwide on The Filipino Channel on August 29, 2016, replacing Dolce Amore.

The romantic comedy follows the story of three friends — Sebastian (Basti), a boy; Iris, a girl; and Alejandro (Ali), a closeted homosexual - who eventually fall in love with each other and find themselves in an unusual love triangle.

Urban Luzon/NUTAM (Nationwide Urban) ratings are provided by AGB Nielsen Philippines while the nationwide ratings are provided by Kantar Media Philippines.

As of January 20, 2017, 105 episodes of Till I Met You have aired.

== Series overview ==
Month	Episodes	Monthly Averages	
Month	Episodes	Urban Luzon/ NUTAM	Nationwide
August 2016	3	19.50%	28.50%
September 2016	22	16.45%	22.04%
October 2016	21	12.12%	14.22%
November 2016	22	10.78%	13.68%
December 2016	22	10.80%	13.28%
January 2017	15	11.49%	13.89%
Total	105	13.52%	17.60%

== Episodes ==
=== August 2016 ===
#	Episode	Original Air Date	Urban Luzon			Nationwide			Ref.
#	Episode	Original Air Date	Rating	Timeslot Rank	Primetime Rank	Rating	Timeslot Rank	Primetime Rank	Ref.
1	"Love Begins"	August 29, 2016	21.0%	#1	#5	28.2%	#1	#3	
2	"Friends in Love"	August 30, 2016	18.5%	#2	#6	29.1%	#1	#3	
3	"Hello Greece"	August 31, 2016	19.0%	#2	#6	28.2%	#1	#3	

=== September 2016 ===
#	Episode	Original Air Date	Urban Luzon			Nationwide			Ref.
#	Episode	Original Air Date	Rating	Timeslot Rank	Primetime Rank	Rating	Timeslot Rank	Primetime Rank	Ref.
4	"Meet Basti"	September 1, 2016	19.6%	#2	#5	28.9%	#1	#3	
5	"Third Wheel"	September 2, 2016	19.7%	#2	#5	28.8%	#1	#3	
6	"Signs"	September 5, 2016	19.4%	#2	#6	26.9%	#1	#3	
7	"The Dugdug Moment"	September 6, 2016	18.3%	#2	#6	28.3%	#1	#3	
8	"The Admission"	September 7, 2016	18.7%	#2	#6	26.3%	#1	#3	
9	"The Confession"	September 8, 2016	17.9%	#2	#6	26.2%	#1	#3	
10	"It's Complicated"	September 9, 2016	16.0%	#2	#6	26.1%	#1	#3	
11	"The Pact"	September 12, 2016	17.0%	#2	#6	23.9%	#1	#3	
12	"Santorini"	September 13, 2016	18.4%	#2	#6	24.6%	#1	#3	
13	"Closer"	September 14, 2016	17.2%	#2	#6	26.1%	#1	#3	
14	"Chance"	September 15, 2016	18.0%	#2	#6	26.5%	#1	#3	
15	"Unfriend"	September 16, 2016	17.8%	#2	#6	24.4%	#1	#3	
16	"In Denial"	September 19, 2016	15.4%	#1	#7	16.7%	#1	#7	
17	"Concerned"	September 20, 2016	15.3%	#1	#7	17.9%	#1	#7	
18	"The Rooftop Kiss"	September 21, 2016	15.8%	#1	#7	18.2%	#1	#7	
19	"The Unexpected"	September 22, 2016	15.8%	#1	#7	19.9%	#1	#7	
20	"Go Get Her"	September 23, 2016	14.3%	#2	#8	17.2%	#1	#7	
21	"Fight for Love"	September 26, 2016	14.2%	#1	#7	15.8%	#1	#7	
22	"Amend"	September 27, 2016	12.9%	#2	#8	16.0%	#1	#7	
23	"Letting Go"	September 28, 2016	13.3%	#2	#7	15.2%	#1	#7	
24	"Broken Hearts"	September 29, 2016	13.9%	#2	#8	14.9%	#1	#7	
25	"Moving On"	September 30, 2016	13.1%	#2	#8	16.1%	#1	#7	

=== October 2016 ===
#	Episode	Original Air Date	Urban Luzon			Nationwide			Ref.
#	Episode	Original Air Date	Rating	Timeslot Rank	Primetime Rank	Rating	Timeslot Rank	Primetime Rank	Ref.
26	"Awkward"	October 3, 2016	12.8%	#2	#8	15.3%	#1	#7	
27	"Stay Away"	October 4, 2016	11.9%	#2	#8	14.4%	#1	#7	
28	"Love Triangle"	October 5, 2016	11.5%	#2	#8	14.8%	#1	#7	
29	"With You Now"	October 6, 2016	12.6%	#2	#8	14.5%	#1	#7	
30	"Feelings"	October 7, 2016	10.9%	#2	#9	13.3%	#1	#7	
31	"Love Struck"	October 10, 2016	10.8%	#2	#8	13.6%	#1	#7	
32	"First Date"	October 11, 2016	11.8%	#2	#8	13.9%	#1	#7	
33	"Get Better"	October 12, 2016	11.0%	#2	#8	13.6%	#1	#7	
34	"Love Nest"	October 13, 2016	12.7%	#2	#8	14.3%	#1	#7	
35	"Expectations"	October 14, 2016	10.3%	#2	#9	12.9%	#1	#7	
36	"Break the Ice"	October 17, 2016	12.5%	#2	#8	15.1%	#1	#7	
37	"Coming Out"	October 18, 2016	13.5%	#2	#8	14.7%	#1	#7	
38	"Uncertain"	October 19, 2016	9.2%	#2	#8	10.9%	#1	#7	
39	"Officially Yours"	October 20, 2016	12.2%	#2	#8	13.5%	#1	#7	
40	"Fresh Start"	October 21, 2016	12.4%	#2	#9	12.8%	#1	#7	
41	"The Proposal"	October 24, 2016	13.4%	#2	#8	14.6%	#1	#7	
42	"Run Away"	October 25, 2016	13.1%	#2	#8	15.9%	#1	#7	
43	"Express Wedding"	October 26, 2016	13.9%	#2	#8	15.8%	#1	#7	
44	"Mr. and Mrs. Valderama"	October 27, 2016	13.4%	#2	#7	15.4%	#1	#7	
45	"House Rules"	October 28, 2016	12.3%	#2	#9	15.1%	#1	#7	
46	"Kapit Lang Love"	October 31, 2016	12.3%	#2	#8	14.3%	#1	#7	

=== November 2016 ===
#	Episode	Original Air Date	Urban Luzon			Nationwide			Ref.
#	Episode	Original Air Date	Rating	Timeslot Rank	Primetime Rank	Rating	Timeslot Rank	Primetime Rank	Ref.
47	"Struggle Is Real"	November 1, 2016	11.5%	#2	#9	14.3%	#1	#7	
48	"Get Going"	November 2, 2016	11.4%	#2	#8	13.1%	#1	#7	
49	"Priorities"	November 3, 2016	11.8%	#2	#8	13.8%	#1	#7	
50	"Love Crash"	November 4, 2016	12.0%	#2	#9	15.1%	#1	#7	
51	"Tampo Feels"	November 7, 2016	12.1%	#2	#8	13.6%	#1	#7	
52	"Done Deal"	November 8, 2016	11.0%	#2	#8	12.8%	#1	#7	
53	"Spoiler Alert"	November 9, 2016	11.4%	#2	#7	13.9%	#1	#7	
54	"Moving Out"	November 10, 2016	11.1%	#2	#7	14.8%	#1	#7	
55	"Husband Goals"	November 11, 2016	11.2%	#2	#9	14.8%	#1	#7	
56	"Baby Blues"	November 14, 2016	10.4%	#2	#8	13.4%	#1	#7	
57	"Trust"	November 15, 2016	10.0%	#2	#8	14.0%	#1	#7	
58	"Contradiction"	November 16, 2016	10.5%	#2	#8	13.9%	#1	#7	
59	"Reality Check"	November 17, 2016	9.9%	#2	#9	12.6%	#1	#7	
60	"Realization"	November 18, 2016	10.8%	#2	#9	—	—	—	
61	"The Game Plan"	November 21, 2016	11.0%	#2	#8	13.2%	#1	#7	
62	"For The Future"	November 22, 2016	10.4%	#2	#8	13.9%	#1	#7	
63	"Real Deal"	November 23, 2016	9.8%	#2	#8	13.7%	#1	#7	
64	"Trouble"	November 24, 2016	10.7%	#2	#8	12.7%	#1	#7	
65	"Challenge Accepted"	November 25, 2016	9.2%	#2	#9	12.0%	#1	#7	
			Nationwide Urban			Nationwide			
66	"Never Give Up"	November 28, 2016	9.2%	#2	#8	13.6%	#1	#7	
67	"I Got You"	November 29, 2016	10.7%	#2	#8	14.2%	#1	#7	
68	"Love Snatch"	November 30, 2016	11.1%	#2	#8	13.9%	#1	#7	

=== December 2016 ===
#	Episode	Original Air Date	Nationwide Urban			Nationwide			Ref.
#	Episode	Original Air Date	Rating	Timeslot Rank	Primetime Rank	Rating	Timeslot Rank	Primetime Rank	Ref.
69	"Stranded"	December 1, 2016	10.9%	#2	#8	13.2%	#1	#7	
70	"Lost with You"	December 2, 2016	10.9%	#2	#8	11.7%	#1	#7	
71	"Ready for Future"	December 5, 2016	11.5%	#2	#8	13.6%	#1	#7	
72	"Surprise"	December 6, 2016	10.6%	#2	#8	13.4%	#1	#7	
73	"The Set Up"	December 7, 2016	11.3%	#2	#8	13.6%	#1	#7	
74	"Special Day"	December 8, 2016	11.8%	#2	#8	12.9%	#1	#7	
75	"The Love Team Is Back"	December 9, 2016	10.6%	#2	#8	13.1%	#1	#7	
76	"Tayo Hanggang Dulo"	December 12, 2016	10.9%	#2	#8	12.9%	#1	#6	
77	"Wedding Gift"	December 13, 2016	10.9%	#2	#8	13.8%	#1	#7	
78	"The Search"	December 14, 2016	12.4%	#2	#7	15.3%	#1	#7	
79	"Preggy Feels"	December 15, 2016	13.1%	#1	#7	16.4%	#1	#7	
80	"Hold On"	December 16, 2016	10.8%	#2	#8	13.5%	#1	#7	
81	"Must Go On"	December 19, 2016	11.2%	#2	#8	14.3%	#1	#7	
82	"Beat the Blues"	December 20, 2016	10.1%	#2	#8	12.4%	#1	#7	
83	"The Announcement"	December 21, 2016	10.4%	#2	#8	—	—	—	
84	"Unstoppable"	December 22, 2016	10.7%	#2	#9	13.4%	#1	#8	
85	"Season of Love"	December 23, 2016	9.5%	#2	#9	13.5%	#1	#8	
86	"Stay Strong"	December 26, 2016	8.8%	#2	#9	11.7%	#1	#7	
87	"The Big Break"	December 27, 2016	10.5%	#2	#8	13.0%	#1	#7	
88	"Back Off"	December 28, 2016	9.7%	#2	#9	11.7%	#2	#8	
89	"Strategy"	December 29, 2016	10.7%	#2	#8	12.4%	#2	#8	
90	"New Year"	December 30, 2016	10.4%	#2	#9	13.0%	#2	#8	

=== January 2017 ===
#	Episode	Original Air Date	Nationwide Urban			Nationwide			Ref.
#	Episode	Original Air Date	Rating	Timeslot Rank	Primetime Rank	Rating	Timeslot Rank	Primetime Rank	Ref.
91	"Sacrifice"	January 2, 2017	9.3%	#2	#9	10.2%	#2	#8	
92	"Wrong Move"	January 3, 2017	10.6%	#2	#8	11.1%	#2	#8	
93	"Toxic"	January 4, 2017	11.8%	#2	#8	13.9%	#1	#7	
94	"Delusion"	January 5, 2017	10.2%	#2	#9	14.3%	#1	#7	
95	"Manipulation"	January 6, 2017	11.5%	#2	#9	13.7%	#1	#7	
96	"Pressured"	January 9, 2017	9.5%	#2	#9	11.0%	#2	#8	
97	"Insensitive"	January 10, 2017	10.3%	#2	#9	13.0%	#2	#8	
98	"Below the Belt"	January 11, 2017	10.5%	#2	#9	12.7%	#2	#8	
99	"Woman Instinct"	January 12, 2017	12.1%	#2	#8	14.6%	#1	#7	
100	"In Your Face"	January 13, 2017	12.0%	#2	#9	16.0%	#1	#7	
101	"Know Your Limits"	January 16, 2017	10.6%	#2	#8	12.7%	#1	#7	
102	"The Face Off"	January 17, 2017	12.1%	#2	#8	13.9%	#1	#7	
103	"The Payback"	January 18, 2017	13.3%	#2	#8	16.7%	#1	#7	
104	"Paano na ang Tayo"	January 19, 2017	12.9%	#2	#8	14.9%	#1	#7	
105	"The Finale"	January 20, 2017	15.7%	#2	#8	19.6%	#1	#7	
