= Jolianne =

Filipino singer

- Born: Jolianne Salvado
- Origin: Cebu City, Philippines
- Genres: Pop; R&B; OPM
- Occupations: Singer; songwriter
- Years active: 2015–present
- Label: Careless Records

Jolianne Salvado, known mononymously as Jolianne, is a Filipino singer and songwriter from Cebu City. She was a contestant on The Voice Kids Philippines in 2015 and established herself as a Cebuano pop artist. Since signing with Careless Records in 2021, she has released several singles and her debut extended play (EP) Plain Girl (2025).

== Early life and education ==
Jolianne Salvado was raised in Banilad, Cebu City. She developed an interest in music early on and began singing as a child, inspired in part by her mother, who is also a singer. She graduated as salutatorian, earning several awards during her school years. She later attended Meridian International College (MINT), where she studied music business.

== Career ==
=== 2015–2020: The Voice Kids and early releases ===
In 2015, Jolianne joined the second season of The Voice Kids Philippines, performing "Tattooed Heart" by Ariana Grande during the blind auditions. After the competition, she returned to Cebu and focused on her studies while continuing to write and record music.

She released her debut single, "Irises" in 2019, followed by "Halfway There" in 2020, which became her most popular early release, accumulating over 14 million streams on Spotify.

=== 2021–present: Careless Records and Plain Girl ===
In 2021, Jolianne performed as an opening act for Air Supply and Michael Learns To Rock. She later signed with Careless Records and released her first single "Sublime". At the age of 17, she moved from Cebu to Manila to continue her music career.

In 2023, she collaborated with Norwegian-Filipino artist HILLARI to create a reimagined version of "Loyal".

Jolianne's first extended play (EP) Plain Girl, was released on January 31, 2025, through Careless and Sony Music Entertainment. It includes the tracks "Plain Girl", "I'll Be Somebody You Want", and "Afterthought". The EP reflects her life between the ages of 16 and 20, showing her experiences of growing up and discovering herself.

In 2025, Jolianne released "Palayo sa Mundo" (transl. Away From the World) with singer Arthur Nery. This was their second collaboration after "Lullaby", released in 2024. The song reached number 100 on the Billboard Philippines Hot 100 in January 2026, her first time on the chart. She also released "Favorite Friend" and "Kuryente" (transl. Charge) with Korean producer Ziv later that year.

== Artistry ==
Jolianne's music includes pop, R&B, soul, and acoustic influences. She has referred to her sound as "Disney R&B". Her songs include acoustic pop-R&B tracks such as "Palayo Sa Mundo", jazz-influenced pop songs like "Plain Girl", and indie folk releases including "Sweet Memories". Her lyrics commonly focus on personal experiences, relationships, and self-reflection.

Jolianne has cited several international artists as musical influences, including Ariana Grande, Whitney Houston, and Sabrina Carpenter. In an interview with The Beat Asia, she also mentioned that a dream collaboration of hers would involve contributing chorus vocals to a rap song, citing projects such as those by Kali Uchis and Tyler, the Creator, as well as SZA and Kendrick Lamar, as examples of the style she admires. She has also stated that listening to her mother sing while growing up, along with her training in classical and contemporary music, influenced her vocal development and songwriting.

== Discography ==
=== Extended plays ===
Title	Album details	Ref.
Plain Girl	Released: 2025; Label: Careless; Formats: Digital download, streaming	

=== Singles ===
==== Lead ====
List of singles by Jolianne, showing year released as single, and selected chart positions
Title	Year	Peak chart positions		
Title	Year	PHL	PHL Top	PHL IFPI
"Irises"	2019	—	—	—
"Halfway There"	2020	—	—	—
"Sublime"	2021	—	—	—
"Brand New"	2021	—	—	—
"Routine"	2021	—	—	—
"Sweet Memories"	2023	—	—	—
"I Can't Sleep" (with Rangga Jones)	2023	—	—	—
"Chemistry"	2023	—	—	—
"I'll Be Somebody You Want"	2024	—	—	—
"Dili Na Lang"	2024	—	—	—
"Afterthought"	2024	—	—	—
"Favorite Friend"	2025	—	—	—
"Kuryente" (with Ziv)	2025	—	—	—
"Palayo sa Mundo" (with Arthur Nery)	2025	23	12	17
"Aminin"	2026	—	—	—
"Daanan"	2026	—	—	—
"Baka Sakali"	2026	—	—	—

==== Featuring ====
Title	Year	Peak chart positions		
Title	Year	PHL	PHL Top	PHL IFPI
"Loyal" (Hillari featuring Jolianne)	2023	—	—	—
