= 16B =

Single by James Reid

from the album Careless Mixtape
- Released: 5 May 2018
- Recorded: 2018
- Genre: R&B; soul
- Length: 3:46
- Label: Careless Music Manila; Flip Music PH
- Songwriter(s): Reid
- Producer(s): Mat Olavides; Reid

James Reid singles chronology
"Caught in Your Feelings" (2017)	"16B" (2018)	"Right There" (2018)

"16B" is a song by Filipino-Australian singer-actor James Reid. The song was released on May 5, 2018 as the lead single off the collaborative mixtape from his own label Careless Music Manila.

== Background ==
According to "Push", Reid explained in his Instagram post that the lyrics were inspired by a close friend. He also stated that "16B is a place, a place where even the most fiery of souls can get lost in the pretty lights."

== Music video ==
An accompany music video for the song was released on Reid's birthday on May 11, 2018 via Careless Music Manila's YouTube channel.

== Critical reception ==
"16B" received positive reviews from music critics, but was also criticized for its provocative lyrics.
