= SOS (Filipino alternative band) =

Filipino indie alternative band

- Also known as: She's Only Sixteen (formerly)
- Origin: Quezon City, Philippines
- Genres: Indie rock; Alternative rock
- Years active: 2008–present
- Labels: Universal Records; Party Bear Records; Bavarian Records; Careless Music
- Members: Roberto Seña; Andrew Panopio; Anjo Silvoza; King Puentespina; Ram Alonzo
- Past members: Kevin Santos
- Website: web.facebook.com/sosbandforever/

SOS (formerly She's Only Sixteen) is a 5-piece alternative rock band from the Philippines. The band is composed of Roberto Seña on lead vocals and rhythm guitar, Andrew Panopio on lead guitar, Anjo Silvoza on bass, King Puentespina on drums, and Ram Alonzo on synth and keyboard.

== History ==
=== 2008-2012: Formation and early years ===
In their sophomore year of high school at the Ateneo de Manila, Roberto Seña and Anjo Silvoza were members of False Targets, a band that loosely experimented with rap and hip-hop and covered artists such as Lady Gaga and the Jonas Brothers. When the lead vocalist of False Targets left, Seña took the role of both vocalist and rhythm guitarist and renamed the band 'She's Only Sixteen', after the Red Hot Chili Peppers' song 'She's Only 18'.

Now lacking a lead guitarist, Seña invited his friend Andrew Panopio to join, as he and Seña shared similar tastes in music. However, shortly after gaining a lead guitarist, their drummer, Kevin Santos, had to leave for the United States, so Seña looked to other bands for temporary sessionists. He asked members of Imelda (another band from Ateneo) if they could borrow their drummer, who at the time was King Puentespina, to session for She's Only Sixteen for a while. Eventually, since King was sessioning more and more for She's Only Sixteen, he decided to leave Imelda and join She's Only Sixteen as their permanent drummer.

=== 2012: She's Only Sixteen EP ===
In 2012, She's Only Sixteen was signed to Universal Records under Orion Entertainment Philippines where they released their self-titled EP on September 28, 2012, with their debut single 'Dying to Meet You'. It was well received by fans and critics alike, and even scored number two on ABS-CBN's 'Top 10 Pinoy Albums of 2012'

Riding on the success of the EP, She's Only Sixteen would go on to perform at numerous major local events such as the first Wanderland Music and Arts Festival and the first Satchmi Vinyl day in 2013. They also performed internationally at Baybeats 2015 in Singapore.

Although they continued to release new music and demos under their SoundCloud, they were unable to 'legally' release new content due to their label tampering with the band's creative control, thus delaying their announced debut album's release by 5 years.

=== 2017-2020: Whatever That Was ===
In the five years that they did not release music through a label, the band fell into a "weird stagnant place". They continued to play gigs and release demos through SoundCloud (which were then deleted before the release of their album).

Despite busy schedules and day jobs, the band still found time to focus on their music. In that time, they were able to develop their personal sound and grow out of their EP, which was largely influenced by foreign artists such as The Strokes and Arctic Monkeys, whom they were very frequently compared and attributed to.

Their debut album entitled 'Whatever That Was' was released on September 30, 2017, under local independent label Party Bear Records.

Seña's songwriting for 'Whatever That Was' departs from their self-titled EP's youthful romantic themes and ventures towards much more mature realities about working out relationships, being alone, and the struggle of adult life. Their sound also hints at their maturity as a band, as they have experimented and incorporated different styles and genres such as jazz, shoegaze and a little bit of samba.

A few days after its release, 9 songs out of 11 were on the Spotify Philippines Viral Chart, with their single 'Magic' claiming the number 1 spot for nearly a week.

On November 25, 2017, the band released a music video directed by Jorel Lising for their 2nd single 'Magic' on Party Bear Record's YouTube channel.

=== 2020-2021: Currently and The Other Side EP ===
On May 1, 2020, the band released their new single, "Currently" on social media streaming platforms. After almost three years without new music, the band embarked on a new journey and ventured into new sounds with their music.

Two singles for The Other Side EP, "Broken Glass" was released on September 25, 2020, and "Good Company" was released on November 6, 2020. The EP was released on November 27, 2020.

On November 12, 2021, the band released Proof, accompanied by a music video shot in La Union, where they have also moved and built their studio (Bavarian Studio) under their indie label Bavarian Records.

=== 2022-present: SOS, CARELESS Music and It Was A Moment EP ===
2022 proved to be a landmark year for the band, which for 14 years went by the name She's Only Sixteen, and will now go by the name SOS, pronounced as "sauce". According to their announcement on social media, they are "ushering a new era for our music, ourselves and our listeners".

On July 22, 2022, the band released their first Filipino single, Seryoso, with a music video starring Filipino actor and singer Jericho Rosales. They have also signed with CARELESS Music, a record label started by Filipino-Australian singer and actor James Reid.

In 2023, the band released two singles, "Roses" and "Please Lang". In 2024, the band followed it up with the release of the much-awaited studio version of "Amore," a then fan-favorite unreleased track. In 2025, they released the single, "Yumi and the Apocalypse," which is part of their second studio album, It Was A Moment, released on March 28.

== Members ==
=== Current ===
- Roberto Seña - lead vocals, rhythm guitar, keys
- Andrew Panopio - backup vocals and lead guitar
- Anjo Silvoza - bass
- King Puentespina - drums
- Ram Alonzo - synth, keys

=== Former ===
- Kevin Santos - drums

== Discography ==
=== EPs ===
- She's Only Sixteen (2012)
- The Other Side (2020)
- Broken Glass (Remixes) (2021)

=== Studio albums ===
- Whatever That Was (2017)
- It Was A Moment (2024)

=== Singles ===
Year	Song	Album
2012	Dying To Meet You	She's Only Sixteen (EP)
2014	Amygdala	She's Only Sixteen (EP)
2017	Leave Me Out Of It	Whatever That Was
2017	Magic	Whatever That Was
2020	Currently	Non-album single
2020	Broken Glass	The Other Side (EP)
2020	Good Company	The Other Side (EP)
2021	Proof	Non-album single
2022	Seryoso	It Was A Moment
2023	Roses	It Was A Moment
2023	Please Lang	It Was A Moment
2024	Amore	It Was A Moment
2025	Yumi and the Apocalypse	It Was A Moment
