= Careless (record label) =

Philippine record label

- Parent company: Viva Music Group (2017–2019); Independent (2019-2024); Sony Music Entertainment (2024-present)
- Founded: 2017; 9 years ago
- Founder: James Reid; Bret Jackson
- Status: Active
- Genre: Various
- Country of origin: Philippines
- Official website: carelessmusic.com

Careless, formerly known as Careless Music Manila, is a record label in the Philippines started by singer and actor James Reid and Bret Jackson (KINGwAw). The label was founded in 2017, with Reid's Palm Dreams as its debut release. The label was initially partnered with Reid's former label, Viva Records, but went independent in 2019 and then later partnered with Sony Music Philippines in 2024. Its current roster of artists include Reid, Massiah, Jolianne, Lesha, SOS, August Waah, and dance crew A-Team.

== History ==
Careless was founded in 2017 by James Reid and Bret Jackson. Reid and Jackson first met as contestants in “Pinoy Big Brother: Teen Clash” in 2010. After their stint at the show, they formed a band called WE ARE WHATEVER. They released a self-titled EP under ABS-CBN's Star Music. In 2013, Reid signed with Viva Records, under which, he released two albums. Reid wanted to have creative control over his music, so in 2017, he decided to release Palm Dreams, his debut album under his own record label, Careless. The name Careless began as an inside joke between friends after hearing a dubstep remix of “Careless Whisper.” When James was recording Palm Dreams, he was asked to give a name for the label. He came up with “Careless.” Discussing his reason for starting the label, Reid said, “I wanted creative control over my music, that was it,” he tells Rappler. “I felt like there was this gap in the music industry that I can help make a difference, that I can fill in, and I guess give more options to artists and create a platform that's more artist-centric instead of so much on the business.”

Jackson, under his stage name KINGwAw, also released his debut album, Island City Poems, in 2017. Both Reid and Jackson's albums featured collaborations with their fellow Viva-turned-Careless artist Nadine Lustre. Reid also released three music videos within the year. The first one being for Cool Down, Palm Dream's carrier single. This was followed by a music video for Turning Up and The Life. All three music videos featured a guest appearance from Lustre, who also co-directed The Life with film director Petersen Vargas. In January 2018, Lustre released her first single under Careless, which was entitled St4y Up.

In 2018, Curtismith, Sofia Romualdez, Astro Kidd, and Massiah joined Reid, Lustre, and Jackson in the team. Sofia joined the team after a chance meeting with Jackson in a studio. Bret was also responsible for bringing in Massiah and Astro Kidd. Before joining Careless, Astro Kidd, who was a graduate of aircraft engineering and marketing management, was making music underground while doing modeling stints. Massiah, on the other hand, was based in Dumaguete and was making waves in the city's underground music scene. As a collective, Careless released Careless Mixtape Vol. 1, which featured 15 tracks. The mixtape features a collaboration with Dumaguete-based band Midnasty for a track called Balenciaga, which features KINGwAw and Massiah. Sam Concepcion also collaborated with Reid and KINGwAw in I Ain't Ever Seen.

In 2019, Curtismith released a 5-track EP entitled Dining Table. In the same year, Reid officially left Viva, and the label came with him, becoming fully independent. The team released their second collaborative collection, The Island City Playlist, which featured 14 tracks. The collection features collaborations with Just Hush, Kris Delano, Billy Davis, Mandaue Nights, Jetter, Jid Durano, Ruby Ibarra, Delinquent Society, Midnasty, and Korean rapper Avin. The release of the playlist coincided with the launch of Careless' entertainment platform, Island City. In December, Careless held a contract signing for Lustre, Jackson, Massiah, Astro Kidd, and Curtismith.

In 2020, Careless collaborated with electronics brand Oppo for the release of the Oppo Reno4. Lustre, Massiah, Curtismith, Astro Kidd, and KINGwAw worked on a track called Clearly The Best You for the campaign and also appeared on the music video for the song. Careless also collaborated with Mountain Dew for the launch of a new soda variant, Mountain Dew Ice, via an original song performed by Astro Kidd, Jackson, and Reid. Lustre released her debut album, Wildest Dreams, in October.

In 2021, Jolianne and hip-hop dance group A-Team joined the team. Careless collaborated with Yamaha to promote the Yamaha Mio motorcycle. Lustre, Massiah, and Reid worked on a track called Own It for the campaign and also appeared on the music video for the song.

In 2022, Massiah released his debut album, Lahi, in March. Lesha, Issa Pressman, and Liza Soberano joined the team. Lesha released her debut album, 3rd Eye, in August. Reid released his second album under Careless, loveless:, in October. August Wahh, Destiny Rogers, and SOS joined the team.

In September 2024, Careless announced that Liza Soberano parted ways with the company, effective July 29, 2024.

== Artists ==
=== Current artists ===
- James Reid
- Massiah
- Jolianne
- A-Team
- Lesha
- Issa Pressman
- Destiny Rogers
- August Wahh
- SOS

=== Former artists ===
- Curtismith
- KINGwAw (Bret Jackson)
- Narez La Fuego
- Sofia Romualdez
- Nix Damn P
- Luke Thorssen
- Luka
- Nadine Lustre
- Liza Soberano
