= James Reid (EP) =

EP by James Reid
- Released: September 4, 2013
- Recorded: 2013
- Genre: Pop; R&B; OPM
- Length: 20:58
- Language: Tagalog; English
- Label: Viva

James Reid chronology
We Are Whatever (2011)	James Reid (2013)	Reid Alert (2015)

Singles from James Reid
- 1. "Alam Niya Ba" Released: August 13, 2013

James Reid is the self-titled debut solo extended play by Filipino-Australian singer-actor James Reid. It was released digitally on iTunes and physically on September 4, 2013 by Viva Records.

"Alam Niya Ba" was released as the lead single from the album on August 13, 2013 and was accompanied by a music video uploaded on YouTube.

== Influences ==
Reid as an avid listener of R&B kind of music, he cited Chris Brown as an early influence for him. He also has a taste in Pop rock and Alternative pop genre of music, and listed Maroon 5 and The Script as his influence and also his evidence for inclination during his live performances.

== Songs ==
The album includes two cover songs entitled "Rock with You" which is performed by Michael Jackson and "Loving Arms", originally written by Tom Jans. Reid also wrote two songs from the album, entitled "You Make My Body" and "Game Changer".

== Track listing ==
No.	Title	Writer(s)	Length
1.	"Alam Niya Ba"	Thyro Alfaro	3:31
2.	"You Make My Body Move"	James Reid	3:31
3.	"Gone"	Alfaro	3:22
4.	"Game Changer"	Reid	3:41
5.	"Rock with You"	Rod Temperton	3:22
6.	"Loving Arms"	Tom Jans	3:31
Total length:			20:58

Minus one
No.	Title	Length
1.	"Alam Niya Ba"	3:31
2.	"You Make My Body Move"	3:31
3.	"Gone"	3:22
4.	"Game Changer"	3:41
5.	"Rock with You"	3:22
6.	"Loving Arms"	3:31
Total length:		20:58
