= Palm Dreams =

Debut album by James Reid

Studio album by James Reid
- Released: July 8, 2017
- Recorded: 2015–2017
- Genre: Pop; R&B
- Length: 35:08
- Language: English
- Label: Careless Music Manila
- Producer: James Reid; Poor Taste; Bojam; RNS Beats

James Reid chronology
Reid Alert (2015)	Palm Dreams (2017)	Careless Mixtape (2018)

Singles from Palm Dreams
- 1. "Cool Down" Released: June 16, 2017; 2. "Turning Up" Released: September 22, 2017; 3. "The Life" Released: December 15, 2017

Palm Dreams is the debut studio album by Filipino-Australian singer-actor James Reid. It was released digitally and physically on July 8, 2017 under his own label Careless Music Manila, distributed by Viva Records. The album was funded, executive produced, and creative directed by Reid, who also wrote all of the lyrics and melodies. The bulk of music production was handled by Paulo Tiongson, who goes by the stage name of "Poor Taste"; aside from the opening track "Turning Up", which was produced by Bojam of Flipmusic.

As of August 2018, the album sold 15,000 copies plus 5,000 equivalent album units from in-demand audio streaming services.

== Singles ==
"Cool Down" was released as the lead single from the album and was accompanied by a music video on June 16, 2017 in MYX and was later uploaded on YouTube the same day. On September 22, 2017, "Turning Up" was confirmed as the second single, with the official music video released on the same day. "The Life" was released as the third single on December 15, 2017. The official music video was directed by his girlfriend Nadine Lustre, and released under "Careless Music Manila".

== Track listing ==
All lyrics are written by James Reid. All tracks are produced by Poor Taste, except where noted.

Palm Dreams
No.	Title	Music	Producer(s)	Length
1.	"Turning Up"	Bojam; James Reid	Bojam	3:49
2.	"The Life"	Paulo Tiongson; Reid		3:38
3.	"Cool Down"	Tiongson; RNS Beats; Reid	Poor Taste; RNS Beats	3:55
4.	"On Top" (featuring Sam Concepcion and KINGwAw)	Tiongson; Reid; Concepcion; Jackson		4:40
5.	"Down Low"	Tiongson; Reid		4:04
6.	"IL2LU" (featuring Nadine Lustre)	Tiongson; Reid; Lustre		4:04
7.	"Forever"	Tiongson; Reid		3:55
8.	"Dangerous"	Tiongson; Reid		3:46
9.	"Mean 2 U" (featuring Kiana Valenciano)	Tiongson; Reid; Valenciano		5:17
Total length:				35:08

== Critical response ==
Palm Dreams received mostly positive reviews, with most publications expressing their surprise for Reid's new sound. Yna de Leon of Esquire Philippines compared Palm Dreams to Reid's previous musical projects, calling his earlier work "over the top" and "cheesy", and Palm Dreams as "an entirely fresh start for James Reid". De Leon wrote, "If anything, James veering away from the usual artista-song style is the detox we all need. Through his project, he managed to expel the muck accumulated over those years when he's only just a pretty boy to me. Palm Dreams is the freaking afterglow." Praise was also given to producer Poor Taste for providing the album with an "after-party mood lighting to the lyrics, accompanying James' singing with his sunrise-to-sundown driving music." De Leon further described the record by writing, "At its worst, all songs only bob and sway, never asserting itself too much. Palm Dreams is glued to a mid-tempo pace with a few distinct flavors. It doesn't transcend binary pop tropes, but the surprise upon hearing the record is worthy of real applause. Not the canned ones that you hear on TV."

Rito P. Asilo of The Philippine Daily Inquirer, calls Palm Dreams "a step in the right direction", describing the tracks as "delectable” and appealing upon repeated spins." Asilo calls the genre of Palm Dreams a "snug fit" for Reid. Asilo also comments that the tracks in the album have melodies that "tend to occasionally go ’round in circles", but concludes that the album still has "alluring harmonies" and "cohesive energy that drive their edgy likability."
