= Till I Met You (TV series) =

2016–17 Philippine television drama series

- Title card
- Genre: Romantic comedy; Drama
- Created by: Dindo C. Perez; Rondel P. Lindayag
- Developed by: ABS-CBN Studios
- Written by: Shugo Praico; Philip Louie King; John Anthony Rodulfo; Danielle Joyce Factora
- Directed by: Antoinette H. Jadaone; Andoy L. Ranay; Dan Villegas
- Creative director: Johnny delos Santos
- Starring: James Reid; Nadine Lustre; JC Santos
- Opening theme: "Till I Met You" by Kyla
- Country of origin: Philippines
- Original languages: Filipino; English; Greek
- No. of episodes: 105 (list of episodes)

Production
- Executive producers: Carlo Katigbak; Cory Vidanes; Laurenti Dyogi; Rondel Lindayag; Roldeo T. Endrinal
- Producers: Julie Anne R. Benitez; Arnel T. Nacario; Marissa V. Kalaw
- Production locations: Manila, Philippines; Athens, Greece; Crete, Greece; Santorini, Greece; Mykonos, Greece; Tagaytay, Philippines; Batangas, Philippines
- Editor: Rommel Malimban
- Running time: 30–41 minutes
- Production company: Dreamscape Entertainment Television

Original release
- Network: ABS-CBN
- Release: August 29, 2016 – January 20, 2017

Related
- On the Wings of Love

Till I Met You is a Philippine television drama romantic comedy series broadcast by ABS-CBN. Directed by Antoinette H. Jadaone, Andoy L. Ranay and Dan Villegas, it stars James Reid, Nadine Lustre and JC Santos. It aired on the network's Primetime Bida line up and worldwide on TFC from August 29, 2016 to January 20, 2017, replacing Dolce Amore and was replaced by My Dear Heart.

== Plot ==
Till I Met You follows the story of three friends — Iris (Nadine Lustre), a girl; Basti (James Reid), a boy; and Ali (JC Santos), a closeted homosexual — who eventually fall in love with each other and find themselves in an unusual love triangle. As conflicts arise, they are led into difficult situations and the decision whether to fight for their love or save their friendship.

== Cast and characters ==
=== Main cast ===
Cast	Character	Character information
James Reid	Sebastian "Basti" Valderama	A rebellious son of Nestor. He grew up in Greece independently, where he met Iris and Ali. He starts his relationship with Iris there, but they broke up because of their family issues. When Iris returned to the Philippines, he followed her and became a photographer. He and Iris slept together in the car where they made love. Basti then proposed to Iris and got married, much to Cassandra's dismay. But Iris and him got married anyway. Then, Cassandra told them they could live in her house. The couple then decided to move out because Basti had a hard time adjusting to Cassandra's way of life. He and Iris then found a small home, and started to live as a real married couple without Cassandra's controlling ways. Basti dreams of having a baby with Iris, but she refuses to make love with him. Later he realizes that it is a two way relationship and asks Iris to forgive him. Later on, Basti and Iris decide to get married in a church. On this special day, it is revealed that Iris is pregnant, however, the couple's dream will shortly shatter as it is revealed that Iris's pregnancy will not progress because hers is a rare case of ectopic pregnancy. In the end, Basti and Iris then reconcile with each other after Val explained to Iris that she was the one who sent and ordered the video between Basti and Madison.
Nadine Lustre	Iris Duico-Valderama	A loving and caring daughter of Cassandra. Her father, Robert Ernesto, didn't know about her existence until she introduced herself to him, only to find out that he is married and has other children. Iris and Ali first developed a relationship, until they went to Greece and he admitted that he is gay and fell in love with Basti. When Cassandra saw Nestor and Val once again, she asked Iris to break off her relationship with Basti. When Basti followed Iris to the Philippines, they fell in love with each other again. Iris and Basti then got married, even without Cassandra's support and consent. Cassandra later accepted their marriage. She is not ready to have a baby when Basti persistently wants to. Later they talk and forgive each other. She and Basti decided to get married in a church. Iris later tells their family and friends that she is pregnant. She and Basti are ready to become parents and even buy the baby new equipment and even gave her a "maternity party". However, they found out that Iris has an ectopic pregnancy which posed danger to Iris' life, so the pregnancy was terminated. This brought sadness to everyone, especially to Iris, who later recovered with the help, love and support of her husband, family and friends. In the end of the show, she and Basti have twins named Apollo and Hera and they forgive each other for each other's mistakes.
JC Santos	Alejandro "Ali" Nicolas	The only child of Greggy and Agnes. Growing up with a general father, he was trained and expected to become a general just like his domineering father. Ali quit the PMA and study culinary. Then he went to Iris to Greece for business reasons and finally admitted that he was gay, to himself. He fell in love with Basti, but gave way because he saw that Basti and Iris love each other. He dated several men, but was hurt in the end. Agnes supports his identity, but Ali hopes in the end that Greggy will accept him the way he is. He is in a relationship with Stephen. Later on, Greggy accepted him as being gay. In the end, he went abroad with Stephen with Greggy's support.

=== Supporting cast ===
Cast	Character	Character information
Carmina Villarroel-Legaspi	Cassandra "Cass" Bermudo-Duico	Cass is bipolar and is prone to being argumentative, bitter and hot-headed. Ateng's best friend and Val's ex-best friend. Iris' loving mother, and is Zoe and Paolo's adoptive/stepmother, and Oliver's wife. Cassandra first had a relationship with Nestor, but he three-timed her causing her heart to become afflicted. Cass then fell in love with Robert Ernesto, who got her pregnant, and cheated on her also. Finally, she met her final love Oliver. After his death, she inherits his two children and treats them as her own. Cassandra never remarried again because she said that all she needs is her children, and that they are her world. When Iris and Basti got married she did not support them, but came to the wedding anyway. Cass then told them that they could live with her, but gave harsh conditions that Basti couldn't handle causing them to get into several arguments. The couple then moved out, leaving Cassandra devastated. Later, she reconciles with Iris and Basti. Throughout the series, Cass started to become friends with Nestor, which makes Val jealous and she made several plans to convince Nestor to returns to Greece; even if it meant destroying Iris and Basti's marriage.
Pokwang	Agnes "Ateng" de Guia-Nicolas	Cassandra's best friend and Val's friend. She is Ali's mother and Greggy's wife and is also Iris' comedic godmother. Agnes is a supportive wife, a doting mother who accepts her son despite his sexuality, and treats him the same. All she wants is for Greggy and Ali to get along because he can't still accept that his only son is gay. Once she and Ali went to a gay bar together, much to Greggy's dismay and she told him that Ali needs him because Greggy won't accept him. Throughout the series, Ateng goes through several attempts to help Greggy accept Ali. In her, Cass, and Val's group of friends, she is the cheerful person in the group.
Angel Aquino	Valerie "Val / Tita V." Reyes-Valderema	Ateng's friend and Cassandra's ex-best friend. She is Nestor's fiancée then later wife, and is Basti's stepmother. At first, Nestor cheated on her, but later they both realized that they're meant to be. When Cassandra found out about their relationship; their friendship is broken to pieces. She is set to marry Nestor. An all out war begins with Valerie Reyes and Cassandra Duico, because they're fighting about betrayal. When Val found out that Nestor was going to meet with Cassandra, she became jealous and stated that his people could go to the meeting for him. She starts to become suspicious that he just wanted to see Cassandra. As Val became even more desperate to convince Nestor to return to Greece, she used her secretary to take a video of Basti and Madison and sent the video to Iris. Her plan was to make Basti return to Greece so that Nestor will follow him. Realizing her mistakes, Val asks forgiveness from Iris and Basti. Her dream then comes true when she finally marries Nestor and becomes Mrs. Valerie Valderama.
Zoren Legaspi	Nestor Valderama	He is Basti's father. A former womanizer who dated Cassandra, Agnes, and Val all at the same time. He later changed for the better and became engaged to Val and are set to get married. Nestor and Basti used to have and estranged father-son relationship, but soon they start to espouse the father-son relationship and become close. Nestor wants to make peace with Cassandra and is sorry for his mistakes. Later, he tries to fix his mistakes from the past and tries to make it up to Cassandra, much to her annoyance and dismay. They then become "frenemies". He later marries Val after she fixes all of her mistakes to Iris and Basti. In the end, Nestor becomes Apollo and Sierra grandfather.
Kim Molina	Kelly Baltazar	The hopeless romantic best friend of Iris since high school. She keeps a cheerful aura and light to the group when all else fail. Accidentally informed Cassandra that Iris and Basti are planning to move out of her home. An angry Cassandra, confronts the two which causes a big fight and argument. Otap later proposes to her and they become engaged at the end of the show.
Enzo Pineda	Stephen Camacho	Ali's new friend. He is the son of one of Greggy's friends. Greggy wanted Stephen to straighten Ali's sexuality and bring him to his senses. But what he didn't know is that Stephen is gay also. He and Ali then develop a relationship. In the end, he and Ali received Greggy's blessing and went abroad to fulfill his dreams of doing culinary.
Noel Trinidad	Lolo Soc Duico	Oliver's father, Paolo and Zoe's grandfather also Iris' adoptive grandfather, and Cassandra's kind and loving father-in-law. Wise, kind, and understanding. Lolo Soc treats Iris as a real granddaughter, spite they are not blood related. He is kind to Cassandra and is her father figure, he helps her try to understand that Basti and Iris need their own space now that they're married. Lolo Soc lives in the Duico residence. When Iris is revealed to pregnant, Lolo Soc is the most excited because that is his first great-grandchild. He went to buy many new items for the child's arrival. When Iris left Basti, Lolo Soc reminded Iris that achievement and success means nothing if you don't have anyone one to share your victory with.
Robert Seña	General Gregorio "Greggy" Nicolas	He is Ali's general father, who cannot accept his true identity. When Greggy finds out that his son is gay, he makes him leave the house and give back the car. Later, he sets Stephen up with Ali hoping to bring his son to his senses. Unbeknownst to him, Stephen is also gay. Ali hopes an acceptance from his father and accept how he wants to live his life being gay. He later accepts Stephen to be Ali's boyfriend and gives them his blessing.
Francis Lim	Paolo Duico	Oliver's son, Zoe's older brother, Iris' younger step/adoptive brother, Basti's step brother-in-law, Lolo Soc's biological grandson, and Cassandra's step/adoptive son. He is kind and is intelligent, and he remains a supportive brother to all of the family's decisions. He was the ringbearer in Val's wedding.
Princess Merhan Eibisch	Zoe Duico	Paolo's younger sister, Oliver's daughter, Iris' younger step- and adoptive sister, Basti's step sister in law, Lolo Soc's biological granddaughter and Cassandra's step/adoptive daughter. Zoe is the youngest of the Duico family. Iris went abroad for her so that they can have money to pay to her diabetes. Zoe was one of the flower girls during Val and Nestor's wedding.

=== Extended cast ===
Cast	Character	Character information
Bugoy Cariño	Jomari "Jomar" Calderon	Pilo and Nanet's son, Nestor's nephew, and Basti's second cousin. At first, Jomar was reckless and always getting into fights and arguments with other kids in the neighborhood. Basti later gave him advice and he changed to the better. Jomar used to have a weak relationship with his father, but with Basti's help, their relationship is stronger than it ever was. He attended Val and Nestor's wedding along with Oli, Pilo and Nanet.
William Lorenzo	Pamfilo "Pilo" Calderon	Basti's uncle, Jomar's father, and Nanet's husband. When Basti went to the Philippines, Pilo took him under his wing and let him live with them. Basti helped Pilo and Jomar in several major situations including when Jomar got into a fight with one of the neighborhood children. Because of Basti, Jomar and Pilo, now have a better and stronger father-son relationship. He attended Basti and Iris' church wedding with Jomar and Nanet.
Tess Antonio	Nanet Valderama-Calderon	Basti's auntie and Nestor's cousin. She took care of Basti while he was in the Philippines and treated him like a son. She attended Basti and Iris' church wedding along with her son, Jomar, and her husband Pilo.
Cedrick Juan	Otap Miranda	Basti's assistant and part of The Love Team. He is also said to be Kelly's love interest. In the end of the series, he and Kelly propose to each other and they become "engaged".
Avery Clyde Balasbas	Oli Calderon	Pilo and Nanet's daughter, Nestor's niece, Basti's second cousin and Jomar's younger sister who annoys him sometimes. The two love each other every much, though. In the end of the series, she was one of the flowergirls during Nestor and Val's wedding.

=== Guest cast ===
Cast	Character	Character information
Prince Stefan	Nico	Ali's date.
Fred Lo	Timothy	A man recommended by Basti to Ali.
Loisa Andalio	Kara	Client of the Love Team.
Paolo Paraiso	Romeo	Ali's date who cheated on him.
Jana Agoncillo	Mira Dee	A client of the Love Team. Daughter of Lorraine and Gino and is TJ's younger sister. Mira is celebrating her birthday party and would greatly prefer a kingdom themed birthday party. Iris and Basti work together and try of make this the best birthday that she ever had. Because of Mira, Basti tries to convince Iris that it would be great to have a baby because he saw how affectionate and great she is with Mira and kids. But Iris disagrees with Basti's statements.
Precious Lara Quigaman	Lorraine Dee	A client of the Love Team and Mira and TJ's mother.
Bernard Palanca	Gino Dee	A client of the Love Team and Mira and TJ's father
Jairus Aquino	TJ Dee	A client of the Love Team. Son of Gino and Lorraine and is Mira's older brother.
Rhed Bustamante	Princess Galang	Robert Ernesto's daughter from a woman named Ruth. She met Iris. Iris became sad and told Basti that she and her younger sister will never got to know her as an older sister. Cassandra then tells her maybe one day they will see each other and know each other as siblings. Iris then hopes on that day that her half-sisters will accept and acknowledge her as their older sister.
Lilygem Yulores	Tina Galang	Robert Ernesto's younger daughter from a woman named Ruth. She met Iris, along with her older sister Princess. Iris hopes that one day they will be together and know each other.
Francine Prieto	Catherine	A client of the Love Team, a perfectionist fiancée of Edward who wants European theme on her wedding. During her wedding, the flowers and arch fell on her and a guest videotaped the scene and posting it on social media. Catherine then threatened to sue the business, but since Edward didn't agree, she didn't do it. Later, she promised that she would bash the Love Team so that they will never have a client ever again. Because of this happenings, all of the Love Team's clients back out one by one to the Love Team's dismay.
Lee O'Brien	Edward	Catherine's fiancé. He was happy with the wedding and decided to pay the Love Team for everything, except the flowers.
Freddie Webb	Lolo Jaime	Husband of Lola Adeng, they will allow Iris and Basti to stay in their residence while they're in Batangas.
Lollie Mara	Lola Adeng	Wife of Lolo Jaime, they will allow Iris and Basti to stay in their residence while they're in Batangas.
Johnny Revilla	General Camacho	The father of Stephen is a general. He and Greggy were friends until he found out that his only son, Stephen is gay also. He believes that Stephen became gay because of Ali.
Ana Abad Santos	Mrs. Camacho	The mother of Stephen.
Bangs Garcia	Georgina	Kevin's fiancée which is a PWD (Person with Disability). Love Team's newest client after they do not have any clients temporarily because of the viral video of failed wedding event of their previous clients, Catherine and Edward. They choose the Love Team as their wedding organizer after they watch the video of golden wedding of Lolo Jaime and Lola Adeng.
Ron Morales	Kevin	Georgina's fiancé. Love Team's newest client after they do not have any clients temporarily because of the viral video of failed wedding event of their previous clients, Catherine and Edward. They choose the Love Team as their wedding organizer after they watch the video of golden wedding of Lolo Jaime and Lola Adeng.
Maggie Wilson	Ms. Zia Gallinger	A famous celebrity who is planning to have a wedding. Zia hosts a bidding and the Love Team does several attempts to get her attention. Iris and Kelly followed her by joining her in yoga class, running a marathon, even following her to a bar. At first, Zia doesn't want to have the Love Team as she believes they are new in the business and they will not pull of her expectations. She later gives then a chance and tells them that they are going against the biggest and the best.
June Macasaet	Mr. Diego Alvarez	Zia's fiancé and client of the Love Team
Monica Prado	Chrissy Santillan	Wedding planner who intimidated the Love Team
Loren Burgos	Madison Villareal	Also known as MDV, owner and publisher of a famous wedding magazine. She and Basti cross their paths during the Gallinger-Alvarez Wedding when she accidentally fell while walking down in the stairs and caught by Basti. She will serve as Iris' mentor to make her a more sophisticated person to attract more clients in the future. It is later revealed that she is an accomplice of Val who is trying to destroy Basti and Iris' relationship, by seducing Basti. With the plan of recording a video, showing Basti and her kissing, Val's assistant films the alleged "kiss," and sends it to Iris. Unknowingly, Iris goes to Madison's office, and asks her to explain what this kiss was. With her plan to marry Basti, she tells Iris that her and Basti have been going out for a long time, destroying Iris and Basti. Later on in the show, after Iris and Basti break up, she goes to Basti's house, and tells him that since Iris and Basti are now done, they can start a family. She tries to seduce him, but fails, leaving her sad and miserable.
Carla Humphries	Courtney Ferrer	She is the ex-president's daughter who will be married soon. She picked The Love Team as their wedding organizer because of Madison's recommendation.
David Chua	Marcus	Courtney's fiancé.

=== Special participation ===
Cast	Character	Character information
Jay Manalo	Robert Ernesto Galang	The biological father of Iris. He was a customer in Cassandra's shop who impregnated her. After making Cassandra believe that he loves her and getting her pregnant, he escapes the responsibilities of being a father to go to Canada for another woman. This causes Cassandra to harden her heart. Later, Iris meets him but only to find out that he has two other daughters already. He then gives Iris money, but she refuses, because he doesn't want to be her father.
Richard Yap	Oliver "Tito Papa" Duico	The stepfather of Iris. Zoe and Paolo's father, Soc's son and Cassandra's late husband. A customer in Cassandra's shop. Truly loves Cassandra, and treats Iris as his daughter. During Iris' birthday party he faints and it is revealed that he has a deadly sickness. Even though it is hard, Cassandra lets Oliver go because she loves him so much that she can't stand seeing him suffer. She then promises to him that she will take care of Paolo and Zoe, and step in as their mother and father.
Oona Barretto	young Iris Duico	Young Iris is Cassandra's cute and adorable daughter: Kind, understanding, and helpful. When Oliver and Cassandra were set to get married, he asked for her consent and approval. Knowing that they are in love, Iris gave her support. She then inherited a stepfather, and two younger step siblings, Paolo and Zoe. After Oliver's death, she and Cassandra raise Zoe and Paolo.
Andrez Del Rosario	young Alejandro "Ali" Nicolas	Young Ali was expected to become a general, just like his father, General Gregorio "Greggy" Nicolas. Tries to impress his strict and domineering father, put is hard to please, thus, he was treated with tough love. A mama's boy, who loves Agnes very much. Always defending Iris from bullies, and manages to become her bodyguard and best friend. Their friendship with expand throughout their childhood to adulthood.
Kimi Hamzic	young Sebastian "Basti" Valderama	Young Basti came from a broken family. His mother and father had an estranged relationship because she knew that he still loved a woman in the Philippines. That woman was his ex-lover, Cassandra. Basti will do anything to defend and protect his mother's sole memory.

| Jannie Alipo-on - Young Carla

== Production ==
Till I Met You marks the second romantic comedy TV series for James Reid and Nadine Lustre, following their successful On the Wings of Love. This also marks JC Santos' first lead role in a primetime series. It is also the first time real-life couple Carmina Villarroel and Zoren Legaspi are working together in a TV series.

=== Timeslot change ===
ABS-CBN decided to move Till I Met You to a later timeslot at 9:35pm starting September 19, 2016, after the conclusion of Born For You, to give way for Magpahanggang Wakas. This was also the same timeslot of James Reid and Nadine Lustre's past teleserye, On the Wings of Love.

The show ended on January 20, 2017, with a total of 105 episodes and was replaced by My Dear Heart, but the schedule time is after Ang Probinsyano, A Love to Last took over Till I Met You's timeslot.

== Reruns ==
The show began airing reruns on Jeepney TV from December 17, 2018 to February 22, 2019; and from February 2 to May 31, 2020.

It also aired reruns on ALLTV from January 2 to April 16, 2023 replacing Ngayon at Kailanman and was replaced by the rerun of Ngayon at Kailanman; Again from November 20, 2023 to March 3, 2024, replacing the reruns of Araw Gabi and replaced by the rerun of Ngayon at Kailanman.

This series is currently airing on Kapamilya Online Live Global.

== International broadcasts ==
In Indonesia, the series was aired on Indosiar in 2019, with Indonesian-dubbing.

== Reception ==
Kantar Media National Television Ratings (8:25/9:10PM PST)
Schedule	Pilot Episode	Finale Episode	Peak	Average	Episode number
8:25-9:10PM	28.2%	n/a	29.1%	26.8%	15
9:10-9:55PM	n/a	19.6%	19.9%	14.1%	90
Summary	28.2%	19.6%	29.1%	15.9%	105

== Controversy ==
The Movie and Television Review and Classification Board (MTRCB) has summoned executives and producers of Till I Met You after complaints came in over inappropriate scenes and innuendo involving James Reid and Nadine Lustre. Summoned to attend the November 10 meeting were directors Antonette Jadaone and Andoy Ranay, executive producer Arnel Nacario and writer Shugo Praico. MTRCB said matters to be taken up include scenes from the October 25, 26, 27 and 28 episodes, “The 25 October 2016 episode includes a purportedly daring love-making scene inside a motor vehicle, which some audiences found to be unfit for television (despite its “SPG” advisory). As regards the October 26, 2016, episode, we received feedback as to the casual use of the words ‘sex lang ‘yan’ without reference to, or in disregard of, the institution of the marriage,” the MTRCB wrote. “The 27 and 28 October 2016 episodes, upon the other hand, contain allegedly ‘sexual teasing’ as well as more outrightly sexually charged bath-related scenes (bearing only a “PG [Parental Guidance] advisory)—both of which were found by some audiences as inappropriate for television.”

“With the above, considering that “PG” and “SPG” ratings still admit the reality of having young audiences, the Board shall expect you to present your side at the said conference which shall be before a Committee particularly designated for the matter,” the MTRCB added.

== Soundtrack ==
Till I Met You: A Collection Of Classic Musical Works of Odette Quesada
No.	Title	Performer(s)	Length
1.	"Till I Met You"	Kyla	4:12
2.	"Friend of Mine"	Juris	3:28
3.	"Don't Know What To Do, Don't Know What To Say"	Erik Santos	3:29
4.	"Give Me A Chance"	Kaye Cal	3:25
5.	"To Love Again"	Daryl Ong	4:51
6.	"Farewell"	Aiza Seguerra	n/a
7.	"My Favorite Story"	Odette Quesada	4:28
8.	"Till I Met You (Duet Version)"	James Reid and Nadine Lustre	3:19
Total length:			n/a

== Awards and nominations ==
Year	Association	Award	Category	Nominee	Result	Ref.
2017	Guillermo Mendoza Memorial Scholarship Foundation	48th Box Office Entertainment Awards	Prince and Princess of Philippine Television	James Reid	Won	
2017	Guillermo Mendoza Memorial Scholarship Foundation	48th Box Office Entertainment Awards	Prince and Princess of Philippine Television	Nadine Lustre	Won	

== See also ==
- List of programs broadcast by ABS-CBN
- List of programs broadcast by Jeepney TV
- List of ABS-CBN Studios original drama series
