= Reid Alert =

2015 extended play by James Reid

EP by James Reid
- Released: February 14, 2015
- Recorded: 2014–2015
- Genre: OPM; pop; R&B
- Length: 19:08
- Language: Tagalog; English
- Label: Viva

James Reid chronology
James Reid (2013)	Reid Alert (2015)	Palm Dreams (2017)

Singles from Reid Alert
- 1. "Huwag Ka Nang Humirit" Released: January 1, 2015; 2. "Hanap-Hanap" Released: January 31, 2015; 3. "Randomantic" Released: January 28, 2016

Reid Alert is the second solo extended play by Filipino-Australian singer-actor James Reid. Reid collaborated with Thyro Alfaro and Yumi Lacsamana, as well as with Canadian music producer Adam Hurstfield for the songs in his album. It was released digitally on iTunes and physically on Valentine's Day of 2015 by Viva Records.

== Promotion ==
To promote the album's release, Reid launched various mall show events in the "Jadine Fever Tour" culminating its schedule on Valentine's Day, February 14, 2015 - Fairview Terraces, February 15 - Centrino Mall, CDO, February 20 - Fishermall, February 21 - Sta, Lucia East, March 1 - SM Dasmarinas, March 6 - Eastwood Mall, March 7 - SM Bacoor, March 8 - Venice Piazza, March 13 - Ayala Center Cebu and on March 15 - Araneta Center.

== Singles ==
"Huwag Ka Nang Humirit" was released as the lead single from the album and was accompanied by a music video on January 1, 2015 in MTV Philippines and was later uploaded on YouTube on January 9, 2015.

"Hanap-Hanap" was released as the second single from the album on January 31, 2015, and the official music video was uploaded on YouTube on January 30, 2015.

As of November 8, 2016, the music videos for "Huwag Ka Nang Humirit" and "Hanap-Hanap", have garnered 6,093,832 and 30,331,968 views respectively on YouTube. Hanap-Hanap is currently the most viewed music video of James Reid, it is also the third most viewed Filipino song on YouTube behind Filipino rapper Abra's song "Gayuma" and Filipina Pop/Rock icon Yeng Constantino's song "Ikaw".

The fourth title track, "Randomantic" was confirmed as the third single from the album on January 28, 2016 with a music video on YouTube. The music video for Randomantic consists of clips of James' and Nadine's tour in different parts of the USA such as Sacramento, California, and Lake Tahoe.

As of November 8, 2016, the "Randomantic" music video has garnered 4,356,996 views.

"Randomantic" peaked #1 on MYX Daily Top 10, Pinoy MYX Countdown, MYX Hit Chart, MTV Daily Top 10 & MTV Top 20 Pilipinas in the early 2016. It also peaked #3 on MYX Hit Chart & Pinoy MYX Countdown on the 2016 Year-ender Countdown & #4 on MTV Top 20 Pilipinas Year-ender of 2016.

== Critical reception ==
Professional ratings
Review scores
Source	Rating
The Orchard	5/5 stars
Phil Star	5/5 stars
Philippine Inquirer	5/5 stars

The reviews for the album have generally been positive and a taste of fresh songs in the Philippine music industry. Baby Gil of The Philippine Star has stated, It has been quite a while, that anybody else since Gary Valenciano back during the ’80s in local show business, have we had a pop idol who sings, writes songs, dances, acts, does all those things well and also looks great. That was over 30 years ago and it is only now that we have come across somebody like James Reid who is all those things and is also incredibly sexy with a killer smile to boot.

== Track listing ==
No.	Title	Writer(s)	Length
1.	"Huwag Ka Nang Humirit"	Thyro Alfaro, Yumi Lacsamana	3:15
2.	"Hanap-Hanap" (with Nadine Lustre)	Alfaro, Lacsamana	3:21
3.	"10" (featuring Elise Estrada)	Adam Hurstfield	3:05
4.	"Randomantic"	Alfaro, Lacsamana	4:04
5.	"Bonfire Love Song"	Alfaro, Lacsamana	2:58
6.	"Babalik"	Alfaro, Lacsamana	3:05
Total length:			19:08

== Certifications ==
Region	Certification	Certified units/sales
Philippines (PARI)	Gold	7,500^{*}
^{*} Sales figures based on certification alone.
