= Turning Up (James Reid song) =

Single by James Reid

from the album Palm Dreams
- Released: 22 September 2017
- Recorded: 2017
- Genre: Hip hop; electropop
- Length: 3:49
- Label: Viva; Careless Music Manila
- Songwriter(s): Bojam; James Reid
- Producer(s): Reid

James Reid singles chronology
"Cool Down" (2017)	"Turning Up" (2017)	"Caught In Your Feelings" (2017)

Music video
- "Turning Up" on YouTube

"Turning Up" is a song recorded by Filipino-Australian singer-actor James Reid, for his debut studio album Palm Dreams (2017). The song was released on September 22, 2017 as a second single from the record and was published by Careless Music Manila and released by Viva Records. The song was written and produced by Reid. An accompanying music video was released on the same day.

== Music video ==
=== Synopsis ===
In this video, Reid appears to be going through the motions of his showbiz career and livens up at a house party. We then see Reid sitting contemplating on a roof before eventually joining his friends in a wild, wild house party. As the night progresses however, it seems the party does more harm than good as he goes off at himself inside the bathroom of the house party.

Several of Reid's friends were in the video—Sam Concepcion, Bret Jackson, his co-producer in the album Paulo Tiongson, and his girlfriend Nadine Lustre. The video was directed by Deejay Fabian, arranged by Bojam de Belen, and produced by FlipMusic Productions Inc.

=== Release ===
The music video was released on 22 September 2017, same day of the release of the music video in a cabled music channel MYX and after the release of the video, it was uploaded on VIVA's channel in YouTube.
