= Cool Down =

Single by James Reid

from the album Palm Dreams
- Released: 16 June 2017
- Recorded: 2017
- Genre: Pop; tropical house
- Length: 3:55
- Label: Viva; Careless Music Manila
- Songwriter: Reid
- Producers: Reid; Paulo Tiongson

James Reid singles chronology
"Randomantic" (2016)	"Cool Down" (2017)	"Turning Up" (2017)

Music video
- "Cool Down" on YouTube

"Cool Down" is a song by Filipino-Australian singer-actor James Reid, from his debut studio album Palm Dreams (2017). The song was released on June 16, 2017 as the album's lead single by Viva Records.

Lyrically, the song is about letting loose and letting go in a relationship.

== Hypp ==
In an interview of Inside Showbiz, Reid revealed that he had been wanting to write and produce songs based on his own taste and experiences. He also spent many days in the studio, perfecting the songs in his upcoming album, Palm Dreams.

== Chart performance ==
"Cool Down" was a massive success, it peaked #1 on Pinoy MYX Countdown for 14 weeks. It also peaked #1 on MYX Hit Chart for 11 weeks. Marked as "Cool Down", is the longest stayed at number 1 spot on Pinoy MYX Countdown.

"Cool Down" also peaked on top spot on Magic 89.9's Magic Pop 30 on July 22, 2017, as well on 99.5 Play FM's Playlist on August 11, 2017.

== Music video ==
The music video was released on 16 June 2017, the same day of release as Spotify Philippines and iTunes. The video premiered 6:00 p.m. in a cable channel MYX. After the release of the video, it was uploaded on VIVA's channel in YouTube. On July 31, 2017, the official music video for "Cool Down" reached 1 million views on YouTube.

It was filmed by Deej Fabian, a photographer and videographer, in Coco Plantation in Baler, Aurora around June 2017. The video's visuals has been described as "irresistible and inviting".

== Release history ==
List of regions, release dates, showing formats, label and references
Region	Date	Format(s)	Label	Ref.
Various	16 June 2017	Digital download; streaming	Viva	
