= James Reid (actor) =

Filipino actor (born 1993)

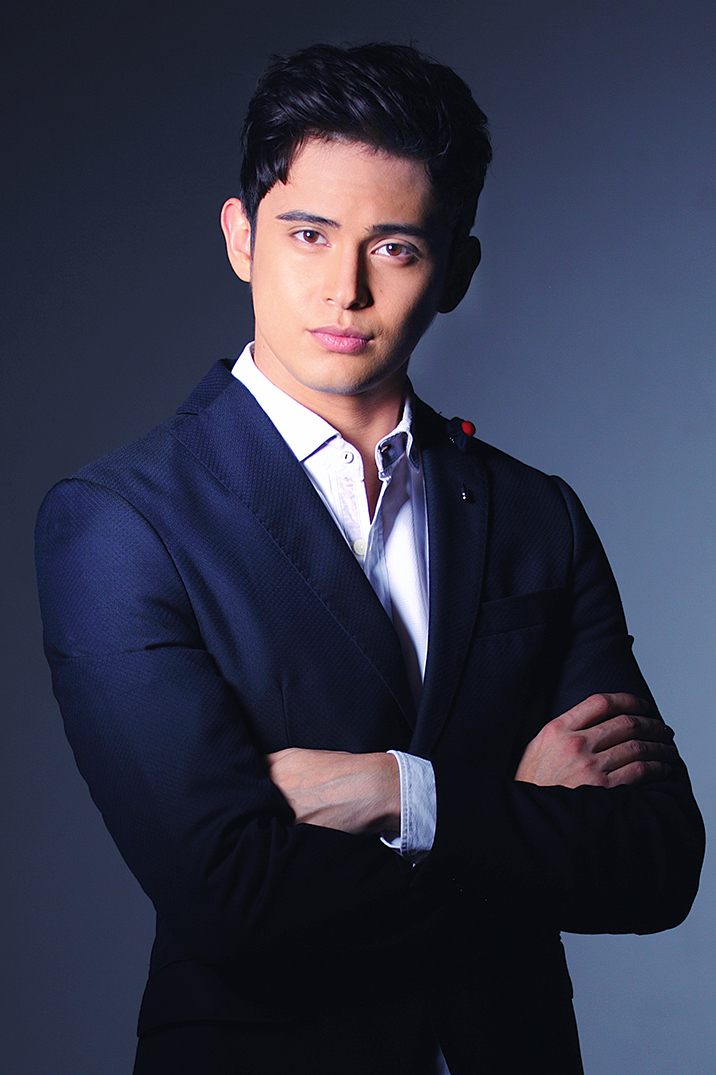
- Reid in 2015
- Born: Robert James Reid (Note: James Reid was born in Australia. Thus, he does not possess his mother's maiden name which is Marquinez.); 11 May 1993 (age 33); Sydney, New South Wales, Australia
- Citizenship: Australia; Philippines
- Education: Makati Science High School; Karabar High School Distance Education Centre
- Occupations: Actor; singer; dancer; endorser; producer
- Years active: 2010–present
- Agents: Star Magic; Viva Artists Agency; TV5 Network; Transparent Arts
- Awards: Full list
- Musical career
- Genres: P-pop; pop; R&B; soul; hip hop
- Instruments: Vocals; guitar; piano
- Years active: 2011–present
- Labels: Star; Viva; Careless Music; Transparent Arts; Sony Philippines

Robert James Reid (born 11 May 1993) is an Australian-born Filipino actor and singer. He came into prominence for his leading role in the film Diary ng Panget (2014). Reid has since starred in Filipino movies such as Talk Back and You're Dead (2014), Para sa Hopeless Romantic (2015), This Time (2016) and Never Not Love You (2018). He also played starring roles in Philippine television dramas including Good Vibes (2011), On the Wings of Love (2015–16), Till I Met You (2016–17), and Someone, Someday (2026).

Reid is popularly referred to as the country's “Multimedia Prince” by multiple media outlets and has bagged a FAMAS Award, an MTV Europe Music Award and two SBS Pop Asia Awards. He has released two studio albums: Palm Dreams (2017) and lovescene: (2022), both self-produced under his own record label, Careless; and three EPs: We Are Whatever (2011) with Bret Jackson, James Reid (2013) and Reid Alert (2015).

== Early life ==
Robert James Reid was born in Sydney, Australia, on 11 May 1993 to an English Australian father, Robert Malcolm Reid and a Filipino mother, Maria Aprilyn Marquinez. He has four half-brothers and two half-sisters from his father's side (including model Lauren Reid), and one half-sister from his mother's side. His parents separated when he was two years old, and Reid lived in Australia until he was fifteen. With his father, Reid moved to the Philippines due to financial issues. Reid has stated before that he found it difficult to adjust to his new life in the Philippines, especially due to the different academic and social skills required, as well as language difficulties. Back in Australia, he was a gymnast and swimmer. He was enrolled in Makati Science High School, but his father enrolled him in Karabar High School Distance Education Centre, an Australian distance-learning center located in Karabar, New South Wales, Australia.

== Career ==
=== 2010: Pinoy Big Brother ===
Reid was only 17 years old when he entered the Pinoy Big Brother house as one of the 10 "Teenternational" housemates on 30 April 2010 (Day 22). He celebrated his 17th birthday inside the house with his co-teenternational housemates giving him a surprise pool party. Reid was the only teenternational housemate who had Filipino blood. Reid was almost evicted twice during his stay inside the house. The first one occurred on 21 May 2010 (Day 43) when Reid was brought to the hospital due to chest pains, discoloration, and shortness of breath while the second one happened on 1 June 2010 (Day 53), when he was again brought to the hospital for the same health issues but this time together with fellow housemate Angelo Pasco. At first, the doctors diagnosed Reid with costochondritis, but during his second visit at the hospital, the doctors found a hole in one of his lungs causing him difficulties in breathing. After the complications, Reid was able to return to the Big Brother house but needed to rest frequently as well as constantly wearing an oxygen tube for one week. One 8 June 2010 (Day 60), Reid was notified by the producers of Big Brother that he was no longer required to use the oxygen tube except while sleeping.

On 26 June 2010 (Day 78), he was crowned as the Pinoy Big Brother: Teen Clash 2010 Big Winner after receiving 179,294 (19.75%) of the total votes, just 1.05% ahead of the total votes received by the runner-up Ryan Bang who got 169, 697 (18.70%) of the total votes.

=== 2011–2013: Career beginnings, solo musical career ===
On 24 July 2011, Reid, together with Pinoy Big Brother housemate Bret Jackson, launched their first digital EP entitled We Are Whatever on ASAP Rocks. Reid and Jackson recorded four original songs, including "Can't Dance" featuring their co-housemates Ann Li and Fretzie Bercede.

Right after winning PBB, Reid was paired with his co-housemate Devon Seron in some ABS-CBN shows like Shoutout! and Good Vibes. He was offered a two-year Star Magic contract with ABS-CBN. He was also paired with Yen Santos in Pintada.

In 2012, Reid left Star Magic and signed with Viva Artists Agency. A year later, he launched his first solo release, a self-titled EP, with two covers and four original songs, two of which composed by Reid himself.

=== 2014: Diary ng Panget and breakthrough success ===
In 2014, he starred in the movie Diary ng Panget together with Nadine Lustre, Yassi Pressman and Andre Paras. The movie was released on 2 April 2014 and became a box-office hit earning at least 119.5 million pesos during its 5-week run. He also lent his voice to the official soundtrack of the film.

On 2 June 2014, it was confirmed that he and Lustre would star in another film titled Talk Back and You're Dead together with Yassi Pressman and Joseph Marco. The film is also based on the best-selling book of the same name by Alesana Marie. The movie was released two months later, on 20 August 2014, co-produced by Viva Films and Skylight Films. During its 4-week run the movie has grossed 79.8 million pesos according to Box Office Mojo. Just like in his previous film, he also lent his voice to the official soundtrack of the film.

On 22 October 2014, it was announced that he and Lustre will do another movie entitled Para sa Hopeless Romantic together with Julia Barretto, Iñigo Pascual, AJ Muhlach and Shy Carlos. The movie is based on a book written by Marcelo Santos III and will be under Viva Films and Skylight Films. The film was released on 13 May 2015. His performance garnered him a nomination for Outstanding Achievement By An Actor In a Leading Role.

On 26 August 2014, Reid signed a two-year contract with ABS-CBN that marked his exclusivity to the network again after two years of freelancing and becoming a talent of Viva Artists Agency, as ABS-CBN gave him popularity. As part of the contract, Reid and his onscreen partner Nadine Lustre starred in their first TV series together as a loveteam entitled Wansapanataym Presents: My App #Boyfie which was also based on Wattpad story.

=== 2015–2016: Reid Alert, On The Wings of Love, This Time, and Till I Met You ===
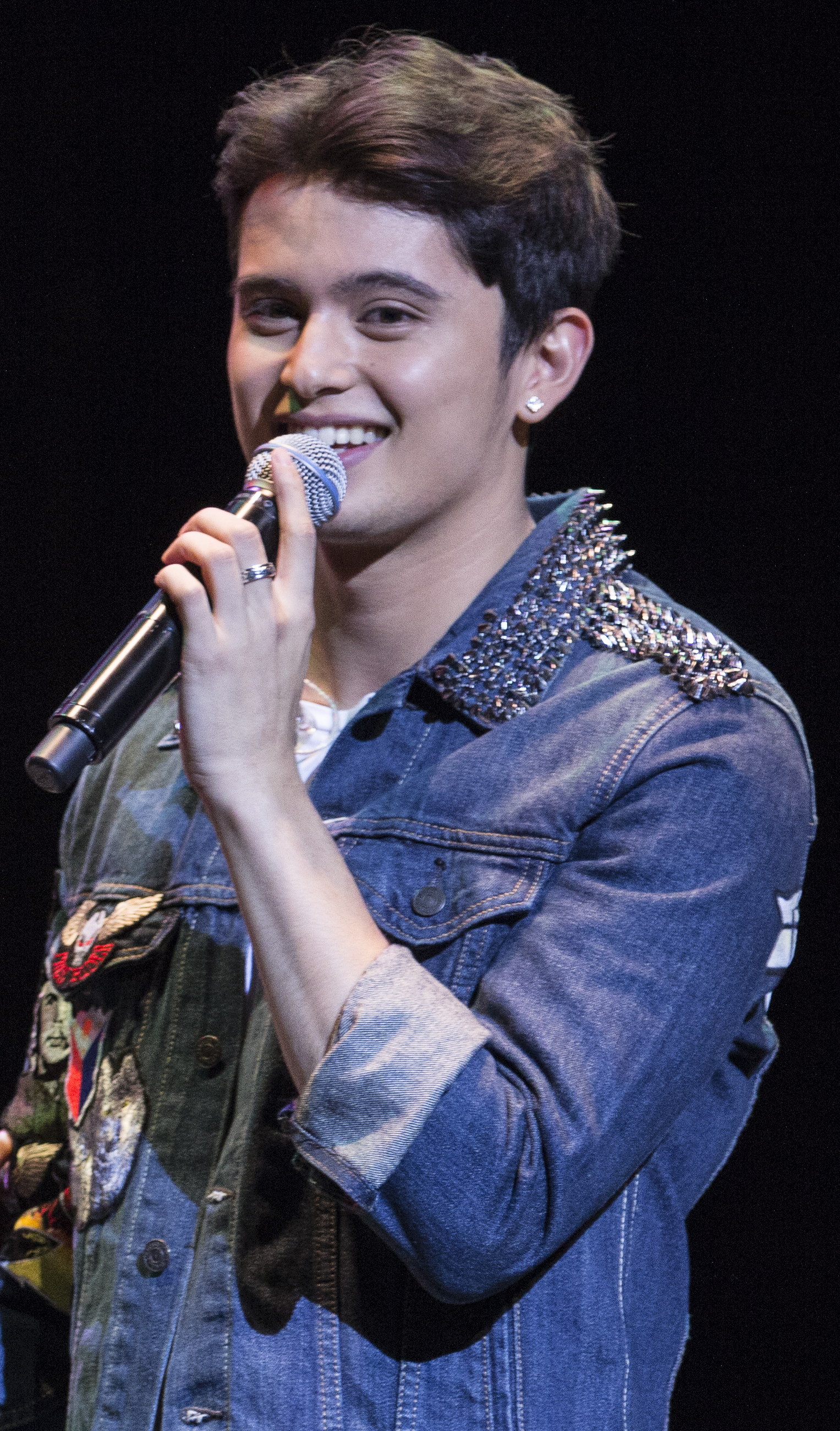
Reid in 2016

On 2 January 2015, Reid revealed that he will be releasing his second solo album within the year. It was reported that the album will include songs in collaboration with Canadian music producer Adam Hurstfield who has written and/or produced for artists such as Ashley Tisdale, Ne-Yo, Aly Michalka, Loverboy, Elise Estrada and many more. On 10 January, Reid's new music video for the song "Huwag Ka Nang Humirit", composed by Thyro Alfaro and Yumi Lacsamana, premiered on Viva's YouTube channel. After its release, the music video began trending on social media and went viral in less than a week.

On 21 January 2015, the music video for the song entitled "Hanap Hanap" premiered in MTV Pinoy. The song is his fourth collaboration with Nadine Lustre after "No Erase", "Rocketeer" and "Bahala Na". It was also used as the theme song for his then upcoming movies with Lustre such as Diary Ng Panget, Talk Back You're Dead, and Para sa Hopeless Romantic.

Reid's third EP Reid Alert was released on Valentine's Day of 2015 by Viva Records. It debuted at #2 in Philippine iTunes pop music album charts behind Taylor Swift's 1989. On 28 January 2016, he released "Randomantic", as the third single from Reid Alert.

On 20 February 2016, Reid and his on-screen partner, Nadine Lustre, had their first major concert titled "JaDine In Love" at the Smart Araneta Coliseum. Due to the clamor of JaDine fans overseas, Reid and Lustre embarked on the "JaDine Love World Tour" presented by TFC in March. They visited Doha, Dubai, London and Milan.

In June 2016, it was announced that Reid and Lustre will be making their small screen comeback through the series, Till I Met You, with JC Santos, Angel Aquino, Carmina Villarroel, and Zoren Legaspi.

=== 2017–2019: Careless and focus on music career ===
In March 2017, Reid announced first studio album Palm Dreams. Reid stated that he wrote all the tracks in the album alongside rapper and music producer, Paulo Tiongson. On 16 June 2017, Reid released "Cool Down" as the album's lead single. The album was released on 8 July 2017 and marked the foundation of Reid's own independent record label, Careless. Palm Dreams spawned two more singles; "Turning Up" and "The Life".

In March 2018, Reid and Lustre made their big screen comeback with the Antoinette Jadaone film Never Not Love You. His performance in the film garnered him his second nomination for Outstanding Achievement by an Actor In a Leading Role at the 67th FAMAS Awards.

In August 2018, Reid starred in a remake of the Korean film Miss Granny with Sarah Geromino in the title role. Reid was also set to star in the new Pedro Penduko adaptation of Viva Films, which was based on the re-imagined version written by Regene Estolatan under Epik Studios. Reid, however, decided to withdraw from the project after sustaining a spinal injury during training. In 2019, Reid decided to leave Viva Artists Agency, with his father Robert Malcolm Reid taking over as his manager. Transitioning to an independent artist, Reid said he would take a break from acting to focus on his music career and working on Careless.

=== 2020–2023: Transparent Arts label, Lovescene, and North American Tour ===
In 2020, Reid was slated to perform at the Overpass Music Festival which was to be held at Oak Canyon Park in Orange County, California. However, the festival was postponed due to the COVID-19 pandemic. On May 30, Reid participated in Our Identity: ProjectBlue Marble, an online musical event which also served as a global fundraising effort in the fight against COVID-19 and to combat xenophobia affecting Asian communities. In October 2020, Reid signed with Far East Movement's Transparent Arts label, which is based in Los Angeles.

In September 2022, Reid released "u & i" as a single off his second studio album, lovescene:, which was released in October of the same year.

In December 2022, Reid announced his first North American Tour which will start in January 2023 to promote his Lovescene album.

=== 2024–present: Back to acting, Someone, Someday, Honey, I'm Home, and Haunted Carnival ===
On July 29, 2024, Careless, Reid's management agency announced the departure of Liza Soberano from their agency. On October 6, 2024, Reid made a homecoming appearance as a Kapamilya and appeared at ASAP for the first time after six years.

In July 2025, Reid went on a joint concert tour with Maki in Canada, with stops in Winnipeg, Toronto, Calgary, and Edmonton.

In August 2025, Reid was announced to star in a new television project under Dreamscape Entertainment, marking his return to acting after almost a decade. He would be working with Kathryn Bernardo for the very first time. Someone, Someday is a romantic drama series that premiered in July 2026. Reid portrays Jordan Valentin, a childhood best friend who is a musician, restobar owner and IT expert.

== Influences ==
Reid is an avid listener of R&B music, and he cites Chris Brown as an early influence for him. After his stint in the Pinoy Big Brother house, Reid signed with Star Magic and would often perform in mall shows. He would sing covers of pop rock and alternative pop songs. He has mentioned that he likes to listen to Maroon 5 and The Script and often performed their songs in his live performances.

Reid also cited Sam Concepcion and Gary Valenciano as some of his local musical inspirations. Discussing Concepcion, Reid has said, "Watched him live, he blows my mind away. I’m so jealous. Not even sure if I idolize him, I’m just jealous." He has also mentioned being influenced by Thyro Alfaro, Yumi Lacsamana, who wrote most of Reid's tracks from his LP and EP releases under Viva Records. Discussing Alfaro and Lacsamana, Reid has said, "for me they are the king and queen of Filipino, of OPM music." He also considers Michael Jackson and Justin Timberlake as his "idols". Reid has also expressed his love for Mario's Turning Point album, saying "I learned to sing because of Chris brown but I learned to love R&B because of THIS album"

Aside from R&B and EDM, Reid has also said that he enjoys listening to indie rock and future bass. He has mentioned Australian band Last Dinosaurs and St. Lucia as some of his favorites. Reid is also a fan of OPM indie band Oh, Flamingo.

== Personal life ==
Reid announced in February 2016 that he and his on-screen partner, Nadine Lustre, were in a relationship. On January 20, 2020, after nearly four years, the couple announced their split.

He later began dating Issa Pressman.

Reid also resided in Los Angeles, California with artists he is handling from his Careless music label and management agency, including Liza Soberano.

== Discography ==
- Palm Dreams (2017)
- Lovescene: (2022)
- Honey, I'm Home (2026)

== Filmography ==
Key
†	Denotes films that have not yet been released

=== Film ===
Year	Title	Role	Notes	Ref.
2011	On Thin Ice	Paul Ruiz	DLSU short thesis film	
2014	Diary ng Panget	Cross Sandford		
2014	Talk Back and You're Dead	Timothy "Top" Odelle Pendleton		
2014	Relaks, It's Just Pag-Ibig	Edward	Cameo	
2014	The Amazing Praybeyt Benjamin	James Anred	Cameo	
2015	Para sa Hopeless Romantic	Nikko John Borja		
2015	Beauty and the Bestie	Tristan Adams		
2016	This Time	Coby Martinez		
2018	Never Not Love You	Gio Smith		
2018	Miss Granny	Jeboy "Jebs" Malabaño		
2026	Haunted Carnival †	TBA	Post-production	

=== Television ===
Year	Title	Role	Notes	Ref.
2010	Pinoy Big Brother: Teen Clash 2010	Himself	Housemate, Big Winner	
2010	Shoutout!	Himself	Main host	
2010–2012; 2014–2020; 2024	ASAP	Himself	Occasional host and performer	
2011	Maynila	Alvin	Episode: "Loving Your Own"	
2011	Good Vibes	Spencer Ziff	Main role	
2012	Pintada	Vito	Recurring role	
2014	Wansapanataym	Joe	Episode: "My App #Boyfie"	
2015	Maalaala Mo Kaya	Marrion "Yong" Gopez	Episode 7: "Stuffed Toy"	
2015–2016	On the Wings of Love	Clark Medina	Lead role	
2016–2017	Till I Met You	Sebastian "Basti" Valderama	Lead role	
2017	It's Showtime	Himself	Guest performer, occasional host	
2019	Idol Philippines	Himself	Judge	
2026	Someone, Someday	Jordan Valentin	Lead role	

== See also ==
- List of Pinoy Big Brother contestants

== Notes ==
Preceded by Melai Cantiveros	Pinoy Big Brother; Big Winner; 2010	Succeeded by Slater Young
Preceded by Ejay Falcon	Pinoy Big Brother; Teen Big Winner; 2010	Succeeded by Myrtle Sarrosa
